= 2025 European Mixed Team Badminton Championships qualification stage =

The following results are the 2025 European Mixed Team Badminton Championships' qualification stage.

== Summary ==
The qualification stage will be held between 4 and 8 December 2024 in 6 cities across Europe.

Group	Host city	Qualified team	Teams failed to qualify
1	(Germany) Wipperfürth; VOSS Arena	France	Slovakia; Slovenia; Sweden
2	(Spain) Ibiza; Poliesportiu Sa Blanca Dona	Spain	Belgium; Estonia; Portugal
3	(Germany) Wipperfürth; VOSS Arena	Germany	Ireland; Italy; Norway
4	(Netherlands) Haarlem; Duijnwijck Hall	Netherlands	Iceland; Turkey; Ukraine
5	(England) Milton Keynes; National Badminton Centre	England	Austria; Poland; Israel
6	(Bulgaria) Sofia; Badminton Hall Europe	Czech Republic	Bulgaria^{§} Croatia; Hungary
6	(Bulgaria) Sofia; Badminton Hall Europe	Czech Republic	Finland; Switzerland

§: Subgroup's winner.

== Group 1 ==
Pos	Team	Pld	W	L	MF	MA	MD	GF	GA	GD	PF	PA	PD	Pts	Qualification
1	France	3	3	0	14	1	+13	29	4	+25	687	462	+225	3	Advance to Quarter-finals
2	Sweden	3	2	1	10	5	+5	21	11	+10	622	496	+126	2	
3	Slovenia	3	1	2	6	9	−3	12	18	−6	445	522	−77	1	
4	Slovakia	3	0	3	0	15	−15	1	30	−29	378	652	−274	0	

Source: TS

=== Slovakia vs. Sweden ===
Slovakia
0
VOSS Arena, Court 2
5 December 2024, 12:00 UTC+1
(Note: Slovakia vs. Sweden)

Sweden
5

			1	2	3
1	(Slovakia) (Sweden)	Sebastián Kadlec; Gustav Björkler	15; 21	5; 21
2	(Slovakia) (Sweden)	Natalia Slobodová; Cecilia Wang	13; 21	13; 21
3	(Slovakia) (Sweden)	Andrej Suchý / Simeon Suchý; Filip Karlborg / Mio Molin	9; 21	20; 22
4	(Slovakia) (Sweden)	Olivia Kadlecová / Lea Výbochová; Moa Sjöö / Tilda Sjöö	6; 21	20; 22
5	(Slovakia) (Sweden)	Simeon Suchý / Johanka Ivanovičová; Ludwig Axelsson / Nathalie Wang	6; 21	15; 21

=== France vs. Slovenia ===
France
5
VOSS Arena, Court 2
5 December 2024, 18:00 UTC+1
(Note: France vs. Slovenia)

Slovenia
0

			1	2	3
1	(France) (Slovenia)	Léonice Huet; Kim Matovič	21; 5	21; 10
2	(France) (Slovenia)	Arnaud Merklé; Andraž Krapež	21; 17	21; 16
3	(France) (Slovenia)	Téa Margueritte / Flavie Vallet; Zoja Novak / Petra Polanc	21; 7	21; 16
4	(France) (Slovenia)	Eloi Adam / Léo Rossi; Gal Bizjak / Maj Poboljšaj	21; 5	21; 10
5	(France) (Slovenia)	Grégoire Deschamp / Margot Lambert; Miha Ivančič / Petra Polanc	21; 12	21; 10

=== Sweden vs. Slovenia ===
Sweden
4
VOSS Arena, Court 1
6 December 2024, 12:00 UTC+1
(Note: Sweden vs. Slovenia)

Slovenia
1

			1	2	3
1	(Sweden) (Slovenia)	Gustav Björkler; Miha Ivančič	21; 14	21; 17
2	(Sweden) (Slovenia)	Mirjam Lindgärde; Kim Matovič	21; 9	21; 8
3	(Sweden) (Slovenia)	Filip Karlborg / Mio Molin; Gal Bizjak / Andraž Krapež	21; 17	21; 19
4	(Sweden) (Slovenia)	Moa Sjöö / Tilda Sjöö; Anja Jordan / Kim Matovič				w/o
5	(Sweden) (Slovenia)	Jakob Ekman / Nathalie Wang; Miha Ivančič / Petra Polanc	20; 22	13; 21

=== France vs. Slovakia ===
France
5
VOSS Arena, Court 2
6 December 2024, 18:00 UTC+1
(Note: France vs. Slovakia)

Slovakia
0

			1	2	3
1	(France) (Slovakia)	Anna Tatranova; Olivia Kadlecová	17; 17	15; 15
2	(France) (Slovakia)	Enogat Roy; Milan Dratva	21; 8	20; 22	21; 11
3	(France) (Slovakia)	Téa Margueritte / Flavie Vallet; Johanka Ivanovičová / Lea Výbochová	21; 14	21; 12
4	(France) (Slovakia)	Eloi Adam / Léo Rossi; Andrej Suchý / Simeon Suchý	21; 8	21; 13
5	(France) (Slovakia)	Grégoire Deschamp / Téa Margueritte; Sebastián Kadlec / Olivia Kadlecová	21; 11	21; 14

=== Slovakia vs. Slovenia ===
Slovakia
0
VOSS Arena, Court 2
7 December 2024, 10:00 UTC+1
(Note: Slovakia vs. Slovenia)

Slovenia
5

			1	2	3
1	(Slovakia) (Slovenia)	Andrej Suchý / Johanka Ivanovičová; Miha Ivančič / Anja Jordan	11; 21	14; 21
2	(Slovakia) (Slovenia)	Milan Dratva; Andraž Krapež	12; 21	8; 21
3	(Slovakia) (Slovenia)	Natalia Slobodová; Petra Polanc	8; 21	8; 21
4	(Slovakia) (Slovenia)	Andrej Suchý / Simeon Suchý; Miha Ivančič / Andraž Krapež	14; 21	8; 21
5	(Slovakia) (Slovenia)	Johanka Ivanovičová / Olivia Kadlecová; Anja Jordan / Petra Polanc	10; 21	18; 21

=== France vs. Sweden ===
France
4
VOSS Arena, Court 2
7 December 2024, 16:00 UTC+1
(Note: France vs. Sweden)

Sweden
1

			1	2	3
1	(France) (Sweden)	Léonice Huet; Mirjam Lindgärde	21; 13	21; 19
2	(France) (Sweden)	Arnaud Merklé; Gustav Björkler	19; 21	21; 17	21; 17
3	(France) (Sweden)	Margot Lambert / Camille Pognante; Moa Sjöö / Tilda Sjöö	21; 17	21; 23	18; 21
4	(France) (Sweden)	Eloi Adam / Léo Rossi; Filip Karlborg / Mio Molin	21; 8	21; 18
5	(France) (Sweden)	Grégoire Deschamp / Margot Lambert; Ludwig Axelsson / Nathalie Wang	21; 17	21; 18

== Group 2 ==
Pos	Team	Pld	W	L	MF	MA	MD	GF	GA	GD	PF	PA	PD	Pts	Qualification
1	Spain (H)	3	3	0	14	1	+13	28	6	+22	674	494	+180	3	Advance to Quarter-finals
2	Estonia	3	2	1	10	5	+5	21	13	+8	637	574	+63	2	
3	Belgium	3	1	2	5	10	−5	11	20	−9	536	581	−45	1	
4	Portugal	3	0	3	1	14	−13	7	28	−21	513	711	−198	0	

Source: TS
(H) Host

=== Belgium vs. Portugal ===
Belgium
4
Poliesportiu Sa Blanca Dona, Court 1
5 December 2024, 16:00 UTC+1
(Note: Belgium vs. Portugal)

Portugal
1

			1	2	3
1	(Belgium) (Portugal)	Charles Fouyn / Tammi Van Wonterghem; Gabriel Rodrigues / Mariana Afonso	23; 21	21; 9
2	(Belgium) (Portugal)	Julien Carraggi; Bruno Carvalho	21; 17	21; 14
3	(Belgium) (Portugal)	Clara Lassaux; Madalena Fortunato	21; 8	21; 13
4	(Belgium) (Portugal)	Iljo Van Delsen / Yaro Van Delsen; Diogo Glória / Gabriel Rodrigues	15; 21	18; 21
5	(Belgium) (Portugal)	Lise Jaques / Tammi Van Wonterghem; Mariana Afonso / Adriana F. Gonçalves	21; 12	21; 16

=== Spain vs. Estonia ===
Spain
4
Poliesportiu Sa Blanca Dona, Court 2
5 December 2024, 16:00 UTC+1
(Note: Spain vs. Estonia)

Estonia
1

			1	2	3
1	(Spain) (Estonia)	Rubén García / Lucía Rodríguez; Tauri Kilk / Helina Rüütel	21; 14	21; 5
2	(Spain) (Estonia)	Pablo Abián; Karl Kert	21; 15	21; 19
3	(Spain) (Estonia)	Clara Azurmendi; Kristin Kuuba	12; 21	15; 21
4	(Spain) (Estonia)	Rubén García / Carlos Piris; Karl Kert / Tauri Kilk	21; 14	21; 19
5	(Spain) (Estonia)	Paula López / Lucía Rodríguez; Kristin Kuuba / Helina Rüütel	10; 21	21; 10	21; 10

=== Belgium vs. Estonia ===
Belgium
1
Poliesportiu Sa Blanca Dona, Court 1
6 December 2024, 09:30 UTC+1
(Note: Belgium vs. Estonia)

Estonia
4

			1	2	3
1	(Belgium) (Estonia)	Charles Fouyn / Lise Jaques; Tauri Kilk / Helina Rüütel	13; 21	20; 22
2	(Belgium) (Estonia)	Julien Carraggi; Karl Kert	23; 21	21; 14
3	(Belgium) (Estonia)	Clara Lassaux; Kristin Kuuba	17; 21	21; 23
4	(Belgium) (Estonia)	Iljo Van Delsen / Yaro Van Delsen; Karl Kert / Tauri Kilk	17; 21	13; 21
5	(Belgium) (Estonia)	Clara Lassaux / Tammi Van Wonterghem; Helina Rüütel / Ramona Üprus	15; 21	17; 21

=== Spain vs. Portugal ===
Spain
5
Poliesportiu Sa Blanca Dona, Court 1
6 December 2024, 15:00 UTC+1
(Note: Spain vs. Portugal)

Portugal
0

			1	2	3
1	(Spain) (Portugal)	Rubén García / Lucía Rodríguez; Gabriel Rodrigues / Mariana Afonso	21; 14	21; 7
2	(Spain) (Portugal)	Álvaro Vázquez; Diogo Glória	21; 11	17; 21	21; 13
3	(Spain) (Portugal)	Clara Azurmendi; Mariana Paiva	21; 14	19; 21	21; 13
4	(Spain) (Portugal)	Rubén García / Carlos Piris; Diogo Glória / Gabriel Rodrigues	21; 16	21; 12
5	(Spain) (Portugal)	Paula López / Lucía Rodríguez; Madalena Fortunato / Adriana F. Gonçalves	21; 18	21; 9

=== Estonia vs. Portugal ===
Estonia
5
Poliesportiu Sa Blanca Dona, Court 1
7 December 2024, 09:30 UTC+1
(Note: Estonia vs. Portugal)

Portugal
0

			1	2	3
1	(Estonia) (Portugal)	Kristjan Kaljurand / Helina Rüütel; Bruno Carvalho / Mariana Paiva	20; 22	21; 19	21; 9
2	(Estonia) (Portugal)	Tauri Kilk; Diogo Glória	21; 14	16; 21	21; 6
3	(Estonia) (Portugal)	Kristin Kuuba; Madalena Fortunato	21; 10	21; 13
4	(Estonia) (Portugal)	Karl Kert / Tauri Kilk; Bruno Carvalho / Diogo Glória	21; 17	16; 21	21; 17
5	(Estonia) (Portugal)	Helina Rüütel / Ramona Üprus; Mariana Afonso / Adriana F. Gonçalves	21; 10	21; 13

=== Spain vs. Belgium ===
Spain
5
Poliesportiu Sa Blanca Dona, Court 1
7 December 2024, 15:00 UTC+1
(Note: Spain vs. Belgium)

Belgium
0

			1	2	3
1	(Spain) (Belgium)	Rubén García / Lucía Rodríguez; Charles Fouyn / Lise Jaques	21; 14	21; 14
2	(Spain) (Belgium)	Clara Azurmendi; Clara Lassaux	21; 15	21; 14
3	(Spain) (Belgium)	Pablo Abián; Charles Fouyn	13; 21	21; 14	21; 16
4	(Spain) (Belgium)	Paula López / Lucía Rodríguez; Clara Lassaux / Tammi Van Wonterghem	21; 6	21; 10
5	(Spain) (Belgium)	Rubén García / Carlos Piris; Iljo Van Delsen / Yaro Van Delsen	21; 13	21; 19

== Group 3 ==
Pos	Team	Pld	W	L	MF	MA	MD	GF	GA	GD	PF	PA	PD	Pts	Qualification
1	Germany (H)	3	3	0	14	1	+13	29	8	+21	759	534	+225	3	Advance to Quarter-finals
2	Italy	3	2	1	8	7	+1	19	16	+3	624	591	+33	2	
3	Ireland	3	1	2	5	10	−5	15	21	−6	615	658	−43	1	
4	Norway	3	0	3	3	12	−9	7	25	−18	418	633	−215	0	

Source: TS
(H) Host

=== Norway vs. Ireland ===
Norway
2
VOSS Arena, Court 1
5 December 2024, 12:00 UTC+1
(Note: Norway vs. Ireland)

Ireland
3

			1	2	3
1	(Norway) (Republic of Ireland)	Markus Barth; Matthew Cheung	21; 8	21; 18
2	(Norway) (Republic of Ireland)	Emilie Hamang; Rachael Darragh	10; 21	11; 21
3	(Norway) (Republic of Ireland)	Filip Bøhn / Sander Østhassel; Scott Guildea / Paul Reynolds	14; 21	11; 21
4	(Norway) (Republic of Ireland)	Marie Christensen / Aimee Hong; Kate Frost / Sophia Noble	14; 21	21; 17	21; 14
5	(Norway) (Republic of Ireland)	Jonas Østhassel / Julie Abusdal; Joshua Magee / Moya Ryan	13; 21	18; 21

=== Germany vs. Italy ===
Germany
5
VOSS Arena, Court 1
5 December 2024, 18:00 UTC+1
(Note: Germany vs. Italy)

Italy
0

			1	2	3
1	(Germany) (Italy)	Bjarne Geiss / Linda Efler; David Salutt / Martina Corsini	18; 21	21; 14	21; 14
2	(Germany) (Italy)	Matthias Kicklitz; Enrico Baroni	21; 18	23; 21
3	(Germany) (Italy)	Yvonne Li; Gianna Stiglich	21; 19	21; 10
4	(Germany) (Italy)	Bjarne Geiss / Kenneth Neumann; Fabio Caponio / Giovanni Toti	18; 21	21; 14	21; 11
5	(Germany) (Italy)	Leona Michalski / Franziska Volkmann; Martina Corsini / Emma Piccinin	21; 10	20; 22	21; 8

=== Ireland vs. Italy ===
Ireland
1
VOSS Arena, Court 2
6 December 2024, 12:00 UTC+1
(Note: Ireland vs. Italy)

Italy
4

			1	2	3
1	(Republic of Ireland) (Italy)	Joshua Magee / Moya Ryan; David Salutt / Martina Corsini	21; 9	21; 8
2	(Republic of Ireland) (Italy)	Matthew Cheung; Giovanni Toti	17; 21	13; 21
3	(Republic of Ireland) (Italy)	Rachael Darragh; Yasmine Hamza	21; 13	16; 21	17; 21
4	(Republic of Ireland) (Italy)	Scott Guildea / Paul Reynolds; Matteo Massetti / David Salutt	16; 21	16; 21
5	(Republic of Ireland) (Italy)	Rachael Darragh / Moya Ryan; Martina Corsini / Emma Piccinin	17; 21	21; 17	15; 21

=== Germany vs. Norway ===
Germany
5
VOSS Arena, Court 1
6 December 2024, 18:00 UTC+1
(Note: Germany vs. Norway)

Norway
0

			1	2	3
1	(Germany) (Norway)	Fabian Roth; Markus Barth	21; 8	21; 18
2	(Germany) (Norway)	Miranda Wilson; Marie Christensen	21; 7	21; 4
3	(Germany) (Norway)	Malik Bourakkadi / Kenneth Neumann; Filip Bøhn / Sander Østhassel	21; 13	21; 6
4	(Germany) (Norway)	Linda Efler / Franziska Volkmann; Marie Christensen / Aimee Hong	21; 11	21; 16
5	(Germany) (Norway)	Marvin Seidel / Thuc Phuong Nguyen; Jonas Østhassel / Julie Abusdal	21; 10	13; 21	21; 12

=== Norway vs. Italy ===
Norway
1
VOSS Arena, Court 1
7 December 2024, 10:00 UTC+1
(Note: Norway vs. Italy)

Italy
4

			1	2	3
1	(Norway) (Italy)	Jonas Østhassel / Julie Abusdal; David Salutt / Martina Corsini	21; 18	21; 19
2	(Norway) (Italy)	Markus Barth; Fabio Caponio	15; 21	20; 22
3	(Norway) (Italy)	Emilie Hamang; Emma Piccinin	0; 0			retired
4	(Norway) (Italy)	Filip Bøhn / Sander Østhassel; Matteo Massetti / David Salutt	6; 21	12; 21
5	(Norway) (Italy)	Marie Christensen / Aimee Hong; Martina Corsini / Emma Piccinin	9; 21	13; 21

=== Germany vs. Ireland ===
Germany
4
VOSS Arena, Court 1
7 December 2024, 16:00 UTC+1
(Note: Germany vs. Ireland)

Ireland
1

			1	2	3
1	(Germany) (Republic of Ireland)	Yvonne Li; Sophia Noble	21; 13	21; 18
2	(Germany) (Republic of Ireland)	Matthias Kicklitz; Matthew Cheung	21; 17	21; 11
3	(Germany) (Republic of Ireland)	Linda Efler / Thuc Phuong Nguyen; Kate Frost / Moya Ryan	21; 13	21; 23	21; 11
4	(Germany) (Republic of Ireland)	Malik Bourakkadi / Kenneth Neumann; Scott Guildea / Paul Reynolds	21; 11	20; 22	17; 21
5	(Germany) (Republic of Ireland)	Marvin Seidel / Thuc Phuong Nguyen; Joshua Magee / Moya Ryan	21; 12	21; 23	21; 10

== Group 4 ==
Pos	Team	Pld	W	L	MF	MA	MD	GF	GA	GD	PF	PA	PD	Pts	Qualification
1	Netherlands (H)	3	3	0	12	3	+9	26	8	+18	670	509	+161	3	Advance to Final tournament
2	Turkey	3	2	1	10	5	+5	22	11	+11	628	526	+102	2	
3	Ukraine	3	1	2	6	9	−3	13	20	−7	556	600	−44	1	
4	Iceland	3	0	3	2	13	−11	4	26	−22	378	597	−219	0	

Source: TS
(H) Host

=== Ukraine vs. Iceland ===
Ukraine
4
Duijnwijck Hall, Court 1
4 December 2024, 10:00 UTC+1
(Note: Ukraine vs. Iceland)

Iceland
1

			1	2	3
1	(Ukraine) (Iceland)	Viacheslav Yakovlev / Polina Buhrova; Davíð Bjarni Björnsson / Arna Karen Jóhannsdóttir	21; 19	21; 16
2	(Ukraine) (Iceland)	Oleksii Titov; Gústav Nilsson	21; 16	21; 12
3	(Ukraine) (Iceland)	Polina Buhrova; Iðunn Jakobsdóttir	21; 7	21; 4
4	(Ukraine) (Iceland)	Glib Beketov / Ivan Druzchenko; Davíð Bjarni Björnsson / Kristófer Darri Finnsson	14; 21	11; 21
5	(Ukraine) (Iceland)	Polina Buhrova / Yevheniia Kantemyr; Drífa Harðardóttir / Arna Karen Jóhannsdóttir	21; 7	21; 11

=== Netherlands vs. Turkey ===
Netherlands
3
Duijnwijck Hall, Court 1
4 December 2024, 15:00 UTC+1
(Note: Netherlands vs. Turkey)

Turkey
2

			1	2	3
1	(Netherlands) (Turkey)	Ties van der Lecq / Debora Jille; Emre Sönmez / Yasemen Bektaş	18; 21	23; 21	21; 13
2	(Netherlands) (Turkey)	Joran Kweekel; Emre Lale	21; 13	21; 15
3	(Netherlands) (Turkey)	Novi Wieland; Özge Bayrak	16; 21	17; 21
4	(Netherlands) (Turkey)	Ties van der Lecq / Brian Wassink; Taha Emirhan Budak / Abdulsamet Özdemir	21; 11	21; 11
5	(Netherlands) (Turkey)	Debora Jille / Selena Piek; Bengisu Erçetin / Nazlıcan İnci	21; 17	10; 21	12; 21

=== Ukraine vs. Turkey ===
Ukraine
1
Duijnwijck Hall, Court 1
5 December 2024, 10:00 UTC+1
(Note: Ukraine vs. Turkey)

Turkey
4

			1	2	3
1	(Ukraine) (Turkey)	Viacheslav Yakovlev; Emre Lale	7; 21	14; 21
2	(Ukraine) (Turkey)	Sofiia Lavrova; Neslihan Arın	10; 21	15; 21
3	(Ukraine) (Turkey)	Glib Beketov / Ivan Druzchenko; Taha Emirhan Budak / Abdulsamet Özdemir	18; 21	21; 17	21; 19
4	(Ukraine) (Turkey)	Polina Buhrova / Sofiia Lavrova; Bengisu Erçetin / Nazlıcan İnci	22; 24	14; 21
5	(Ukraine) (Turkey)	Oleksii Titov / Yevheniia Kantemyr; Emre Sönmez / Yasemen Bektaş	19; 21	15; 21

=== Netherlands vs. Iceland ===
Netherlands
5
Duijnwijck Hall, Court 1
5 December 2024, 15:00 UTC+1
(Note: Netherlands vs. Iceland)

Iceland
0

			1	2	3
1	(Netherlands) (Iceland)	Noah Haase; Róbert Ingi Huldarsson	21; 8	21; 10
2	(Netherlands) (Iceland)	Flora Wang; Iðunn Jakobsdóttir	21; 8	21; 14
3	(Netherlands) (Iceland)	Ties van der Lecq / Brian Wassink; Davíð Bjarni Björnsson / Kristófer Darri Finnsson	21; 13	21; 16
4	(Netherlands) (Iceland)	Debora Jille / Selena Piek; Drífa Harðardóttir / Arna Karen Jóhannsdóttir	21; 19	21; 14
5	(Netherlands) (Iceland)	Andy Buijk / Meerte Loos; Davíð Bjarni Björnsson / Una Hrund Örvar	21; 6	21; 8

=== Turkey vs. Iceland ===
Turkey
4
Duijnwijck Hall, Court 1
6 December 2024, 10:00 UTC+1
(Note: Turkey vs. Iceland)

Iceland
1

			1	2	3
1	(Turkey) (Iceland)	Emre Sönmez / Yasemen Bektaş; Davíð Bjarni Björnsson / Arna Karen Jóhannsdóttir	21; 14	21; 17
2	(Turkey) (Iceland)	Yusuf Yaşar; Gústav Nilsson	21; 11	21; 18
3	(Turkey) (Iceland)	Büşra Ünlü; Iðunn Jakobsdóttir	21; 5	21; 8
4	(Turkey) (Iceland)	Taha Emirhan Budak / Abdulsamet Özdemir; Davíð Bjarni Björnsson / Kristófer Darri Finnsson	12; 21	14; 21
5	(Turkey) (Iceland)	Bengisu Erçetin / Nazlıcan İnci; Drífa Harðardóttir / Arna Karen Jóhannsdóttir	21; 2	21; 11

=== Netherlands vs. Ukraine ===
Netherlands
4
Duijnwijck Hall, Court 1
6 December 2024, 15:00 UTC+1
(Note: Netherlands vs. Ukraine)

Ukraine
1

			1	2	3
1	(Netherlands) (Ukraine)	Novi Wieland; Yevheniia Kantemyr	12; 21	21; 18	17; 21
2	(Netherlands) (Ukraine)	Joran Kweekel; Oleksii Titov	21; 14	21; 16
3	(Netherlands) (Ukraine)	Debora Jille / Selena Piek; Sofiia Lavrova / Polina Buhrova	21; 16	21; 9
4	(Netherlands) (Ukraine)	Ties van der Lecq / Brian Wassink; Glib Beketov / Ivan Druzchenko	21; 11	20; 22	21; 11
5	(Netherlands) (Ukraine)	Andy Buijk / Meerte Loos; Viacheslav Yakovlev / Polina Tkach	21; 14	21; 14

== Group 5 ==
Pos	Team	Pld	W	L	MF	MA	MD	GF	GA	GD	PF	PA	PD	Pts	Qualification
1	England (H)	3	3	0	12	3	+9	26	6	+20	648	463	+185	3	Advance to Quarter-finals
2	Poland	3	2	1	9	6	+3	19	14	+5	597	580	+17	2	
3	Austria	3	1	2	6	9	−3	12	19	−7	513	583	−70	1	
4	Israel	3	0	3	3	12	−9	7	25	−18	492	624	−132	0	

Source: TS
(H) Host

=== England vs. Poland ===
England
4
National Badminton Centre, Court 1
6 December 2024, 10:00 UTC+0
(Note: England vs. Poland)

Poland
1

			1	2	3
1	(England) (Poland)	Harry Huang; Dominik Kwinta	21; 9	21; 11
2	(England) (Poland)	Freya Redfearn; Ulyana Volskaya	17; 21	21; 19	20; 22
3	(England) (Poland)	Callum Hemming / Ethan van Leeuwen; Adrian Krawczyk / Szymon Ślepecki	24; 22	21; 17
4	(England) (Poland)	Chloe Coney / Estelle van Leeuwen; Wiktoria Dąbczyńska / Ulyana Volskaya	21; 10	21; 12
5	(England) (Poland)	Gregory Mairs / Jenny Mairs; Bartłomiej Butkus / Paulina Hankiewicz	21; 7	21; 9

=== Austria vs. Israel ===
Austria
3
National Badminton Centre, Court 1
6 December 2024, 14:00 UTC+0
(Note: Austria vs. Israel)

Israel
2

			1	2	3
1	(Austria) (Israel)	Collins-Valentine Filimon / Serena Au Yeong; Danylo Dubynskyi / Dana Danilenko	21; 17	21; 9
2	(Austria) (Israel)	Katrin Neudolt; Heli Neiman	5; 21	8; 21
3	(Austria) (Israel)	Collins-Valentine Filimon; Misha Zilberman	21; 10	21; 19
4	(Austria) (Israel)	Serena Au Yeong / Anna Hagspiel; Alina Bergelson / Heli Neiman	25; 23	21; 8
5	(Austria) (Israel)	Wolfgang Gnedt / Kai Niederhuber; Danylo Dubynskyi / Misha Zilberman	12; 21	22; 24

=== England vs. Austria ===
England
4
National Badminton Centre, Court 1
7 December 2024, 10:00 UTC+0
(Note: England vs. Austria)

Austria
1

			1	2	3
1	(England) (Austria)	Callum Hemming / Estelle van Leeuwen; Kai Niederhuber / Anna Hagspiel	21; 18	21; 13
2	(England) (Austria)	Cholan Kayan; Wolfgang Gnedt	19; 21	14; 21
3	(England) (Austria)	Freya Redfearn; Katrin Neudolt	21; 13	21; 14
4	(England) (Austria)	Ben Lane / Sean Vendy; Gustav Andree / Kai Niederhuber	21; 15	21; 13
5	(England) (Austria)	Abbygael Harris / Estelle van Leeuwen; Serena Au Yeong / Lena Rumpold	21; 6	21; 11

=== Israel vs. Poland ===
Israel
0
National Badminton Centre, Court 1
7 December 2024, 14:00 UTC+0
(Note: Israel vs. Poland)

Poland
5

			1	2	3
1	(Israel) (Poland)	Misha Zilberman / Dana Danilenko; Szymon Ślepecki / Kornelia Marczak	14; 21	21; 19	15; 21
2	(Israel) (Poland)	Danylo Dubynskyi; Mikolaj Szymanowski	11; 21	16; 21
3	(Israel) (Poland)	Heli Neiman; Wiktoria Dąbczyńska	17; 21	15; 21
4	(Israel) (Poland)	Danylo Dubynskyi / Maxim Grinblat; Adrian Krawczyk / Szymon Ślepecki	15; 21	13; 21
5	(Israel) (Poland)	Alina Bergelson / Heli Neiman; Paulina Hankiewicz / Kornelia Marczak	7; 21	16; 21

=== Austria vs. Poland ===
Austria
2
National Badminton Centre, Court 1
8 December 2024, 10:00 UTC+0
(Note: Austria vs. Poland)

Poland
3

			1	2	3
1	(Austria) (Poland)	Collins-Valentine Filimon / Serena Au Yeong; Szymon Ślepecki / Kornelia Marczak	21; 14	21; 18
2	(Austria) (Poland)	Katrin Neudolt; Ulyana Volskaya	18; 21	7; 21
3	(Austria) (Poland)	Collins-Valentine Filimon; Mikolaj Szymanowski	21; 14	16; 21	21; 13
4	(Austria) (Poland)	Serena Au Yeong / Anna Hagspiel; Paulina Hankiewicz / Kornelia Marczak	12; 14	22; 21
5	(Austria) (Poland)	Gustav Andree / Kai Niederhuber; Adrian Krawczyk / Szymon Ślepecki	14; 21	18; 24

=== England vs. Israel ===
England
4
National Badminton Centre, Court 1
8 December 2024, 14:00 UTC+0
(Note: England vs. Israel)

Israel
1

			1	2	3
1	(England) (Israel)	Ethan van Leeuwen / Chloe Coney; Danylo Dubynskyi / Alina Bergelson	21; 8	21; 10
2	(England) (Israel)	Nadeem Dalvi; Maxim Grinblat	21; 15	21; 16
3	(England) (Israel)	Freya Redfearn; Dana Danilenko	12; 21	21; 15	17; 21
4	(England) (Israel)	Callum Hemming / Ethan van Leeuwen; Danylo Dubynskyi / Maxim Grinblat	21; 8	21; 9
5	(England) (Israel)	Sian Kelly / Annie Lado; Alina Bergelson / Heli Neiman	21; 17	21; 19

== Group 6 ==
=== Subgroup 1 ===
Pos	Team	Pld	W	L	MF	MA	MD	GF	GA	GD	PF	PA	PD	Pts	Qualification
1	Bulgaria (H)	2	2	0	8	2	+6	17	5	+12	433	299	+134	2	Advance to decider
2	Hungary	2	1	1	4	6	−2	9	12	−3	333	371	−38	1	
3	Croatia	2	0	2	3	7	−4	6	15	−9	303	399	−96	0	

Source: TS
(H) Host

=== Bulgaria vs. Croatia ===
Bulgaria
4
Badminton Hall Europe, Court 1
5 December 2024, 10:00 UTC+2
(Note: Bulgaria vs. Croatia)

Croatia
1

			1	2	3
1	(Bulgaria) (Croatia)	Iliyan Stoynov / Mariya Mitsova; Filip Špoljarec / Luna Šaban	21; 7	23; 21
2	(Bulgaria) (Croatia)	Dimitar Yanakiev; Aria Dinata	21; 12	16; 21	12; 21
3	(Bulgaria) (Croatia)	Stefani Stoeva; Jelena Buchberger	21; 8	21; 7
4	(Bulgaria) (Croatia)	Ivan Rusev / Iliyan Stoynov; Aria Dinata / Filip Špoljarec	21; 19	21; 18
5	(Bulgaria) (Croatia)	Gabriela Stoeva / Stefani Stoeva; Jelena Buchberger / Luna Šaban	21; 4	21; 8

=== Croatia vs. Hungary ===
Croatia
2
Badminton Hall Europe, Court 1
6 December 2024, 10:00 UTC+2
(Note: Croatia vs. Hungary)

Hungary
3

			1	2	3
1	(Croatia) (Hungary)	Filip Špoljarec / Jelena Buchberger; Miklós Kis-Kasza / Vivien Sándorházi	11; 21	12; 21
2	(Croatia) (Hungary)	Aria Dinata; Ádám Könczöl	21; 11	21; 14
3	(Croatia) (Hungary)	Luna Šaban; Vivien Sándorházi	6; 21	17; 21
4	(Croatia) (Hungary)	Aria Dinata / Filip Špoljarec; Miklós Kis-Kasza / Milán Mesterházy	21; 14	21; 15
5	(Croatia) (Hungary)	Jelena Buchberger / Luna Šaban; Kata Kustán / Noémi Kustán	15; 21	12; 21

=== Bulgaria vs. Hungary ===
Bulgaria
4
Badminton Hall Europe, Court 1
7 December 2024, 10:00 UTC+2
(Note: Bulgaria vs. Hungary)

Hungary
1

			1	2	3
1	(Bulgaria) (Hungary)	Iliyan Stoynov / Gabriela Stoeva; Miklós Kis-Kasza / Vivien Sándorházi	21; 13	21; 15
2	(Bulgaria) (Hungary)	Dimitar Yanakiev; Márton Szerecz	21; 7	21; 12
3	(Bulgaria) (Hungary)	Hristomira Popovska; Vivien Sándorházi	10; 21	17; 21
4	(Bulgaria) (Hungary)	Ivan Rusev / Iliyan Stoynov; Miklós Kis-Kasza / Ádám Könczöl	21; 13	19; 21	21; 15
5	(Bulgaria) (Hungary)	Gabriela Stoeva / Stefani Stoeva; Daniella Gonda / Noémi Kustán	21; 6	21; 9

=== Subgroup 2 ===
Pos	Team	Pld	W	L	MF	MA	MD	GF	GA	GD	PF	PA	PD	Pts	Qualification
1	Czech Republic	2	2	0	8	2	+6	17	6	+11	466	377	+89	2	Advance to decider
2	Switzerland	2	1	1	5	5	0	12	10	+2	408	379	+29	1	
3	Finland	2	0	2	2	8	−6	5	18	−13	337	455	−118	0	

Source: TS

=== Czech Republic vs. Finland ===
Czech Republic
4
Badminton Hall Europe, Court 1
December 2024, 14:00 UTC+2
(Note: Czech Republic vs. Finland)

Finland
1

			1	2	3
1	(Czech Republic) (Finland)	Ondřej Král / Tereza Švábíková; Iikka Heino / Oona Tapola	21; 17	21; 11
2	(Czech Republic) (Finland)	Jan Louda; Kalle Koljonen	15; 21	21; 15	16; 21
3	(Czech Republic) (Finland)	Tereza Švábíková; Petra Saarnivaara	21; 13	21; 18
4	(Czech Republic) (Finland)	Jiří Král / Ondřej Král; Iikka Heino / Robin Jäntti	16; 21	21; 19	21; 12
5	(Czech Republic) (Finland)	Soňa Hořínková / Kateřina Zuzáková; Sarah Asfar / Oona Tapola	21; 12	21; 8

=== Finland vs. Switzerland ===
Finland
1
Badminton Hall Europe, Court 1
December 2024, 14:00 UTC+2
(Note: Finland vs. Switzerland)

Switzerland
4

			1	2	3
1	(Finland) (Switzerland)	Iikka Heino / Oona Tapola; Yann Orteu / Caroline Racloz	12; 21	7; 21
2	(Finland) (Switzerland)	Joakim Oldorff; Julien Scheiwiller	21; 12	15; 21	21; 18
3	(Finland) (Switzerland)	Petra Saarnivaara; Milena Schnider	13; 21	3; 21
4	(Finland) (Switzerland)	Iikka Heino / Robin Jäntti; Yann Orteu / Minh Quang Pham	15; 21	16; 21
5	(Finland) (Switzerland)	Sarah Asfar / Oona Tapola; Lucie Amiguet / Caroline Racloz	15; 21	11; 21

=== Czech Republic vs. Switzerland ===
Czech Republic
4
Badminton Hall Europe, Court 1
December 2024, 14:00 UTC+2
(Note: Czech Republic vs. Switzerland)

Switzerland
1

			1	2	3
1	(Czech Republic) (Switzerland)	Ondřej Král / Tereza Švábíková; Minh Quang Pham / Caroline Racloz	23; 21	21; 15
2	(Czech Republic) (Switzerland)	Jan Louda; Tobias Künzi	21; 14	19; 21	21; 10
3	(Czech Republic) (Switzerland)	Tereza Švábíková; Milena Schnider	21; 14	22; 20
4	(Czech Republic) (Switzerland)	Ondřej Král / Adam Mendrek; Yann Orteu / Minh Quang Pham	21; 16	21; 14
5	(Czech Republic) (Switzerland)	Soňa Hořínková / Kateřina Zuzáková; Lucie Amiguet / Caroline Racloz	19; 21	21; 23

=== Bulgaria vs. Czech Republic ===
Bulgaria
1
Badminton Hall Europe, Court 1
8 December 2024, 10:00 UTC+2
(Note: Bulgaria vs. Czech Republic)

Czech Republic
3

			1	2	3
1	(Bulgaria) (Czech Republic)	Iliyan Stoynov / Gabriela Stoeva; Ondřej Král / Tereza Švábíková	18; 21	22; 20	6; 21
2	(Bulgaria) (Czech Republic)	Dimitar Yanakiev; Jan Louda	12; 21	21; 23
3	(Bulgaria) (Czech Republic)	Kaloyana Nalbantova; Tereza Švábíková	21; 17	21; 14
4	(Bulgaria) (Czech Republic)	Stilian Makarski / Ivan Rusev; Ondřej Král / Adam Mendrek	9; 21	21; 19	16; 21
5	(Bulgaria) (Czech Republic)	Gabriela Stoeva / Stefani Stoeva; Soňa Hořínková / Kateřina Zuzáková				not played
