= 2025 European Badminton Championships =

Badminton tournament in Europe

Tournament details
- Dates: 8–13 April
- Edition: 31st
- Venue: Forum
- Location: Horsens, Denmark

Champions
- Men's singles: (France) Alex Lanier
- Women's singles: (Denmark) Line Kjærsfeldt
- Men's doubles: (France) Christo Popov (France) Toma Junior Popov
- Women's doubles: (Bulgaria) Gabriela Stoeva (Bulgaria) Stefani Stoeva
- Mixed doubles: (Denmark) Jesper Toft (Denmark) Amalie Magelund

The 2025 European Badminton Championships was the 31st edition of the European Badminton Championships. It was held in Forum Horsens, Horsens, Denmark, from 8 to 13 April 2025.

== Tournament ==
The 2025 European Badminton Championships is the 31st edition of the European Badminton Championships. This tournament is organized by Badminton Europe and hosted by the Badminton Denmark.

=== Venue ===
This tournament will be held at the Forum in Horsens, Denmark.

=== Point distribution ===
Below is the point distribution table for each phase of the tournament based on the BWF points system for the European Badminton Championships, which is equivalent to a Super 500 event.

Winner	Runner-up	3/4	5/8	9/16	17/32	33/64
9,200	7,800	6,420	5,040	3,600	2,220	880

== Medal table ==
* Host nation (Denmark)

Rank	Nation	Gold	Silver	Bronze	Total
1	France	2	3	3	8
2	Denmark*	2	1	4.5	7.5
3	Bulgaria	1	0	0	1
4	Scotland	0	1	0	1
5	Croatia	0	0	1	1
5	Hungary	0	0	1	1
7	Netherlands	0	0	0.5	0.5
Totals (7 entries)		5	5	10	20

== Medal summary ==
Event	Gold	Silver	Bronze
Men's singles	(France) Alex Lanier	(France) Toma Junior Popov	(Croatia) Aria Dinata
Men's singles	(France) Alex Lanier	(France) Toma Junior Popov	(France) Christo Popov
Women's singles	(Denmark) Line Kjærsfeldt	(Scotland) Kirsty Gilmour	(Denmark) Julie Dawall Jakobsen
Women's singles	(Denmark) Line Kjærsfeldt	(Scotland) Kirsty Gilmour	(Hungary) Vivien Sándorházi
Men's doubles	(France) Christo Popov (France) Toma Junior Popov	(France) Éloi Adam (France) Léo Rossi	(Denmark) Daniel Lundgaard (Denmark) Mads Vestergaard
Men's doubles	(France) Christo Popov (France) Toma Junior Popov	(France) Éloi Adam (France) Léo Rossi	(Denmark) Rasmus Kjær (Denmark) Frederik Søgaard
Women's doubles	(Bulgaria) Gabriela Stoeva (Bulgaria) Stefani Stoeva	(Denmark) Natasja Anthonisen (Denmark) Maiken Fruergaard	(Netherlands) Debora Jille (Denmark) Sara Thygesen
Women's doubles	(Bulgaria) Gabriela Stoeva (Bulgaria) Stefani Stoeva	(Denmark) Natasja Anthonisen (Denmark) Maiken Fruergaard	(France) Margot Lambert (France) Camille Pognante
Mixed doubles	(Denmark) Jesper Toft (Denmark) Amalie Magelund	(France) Thom Gicquel (France) Delphine Delrue	(Denmark) Mads Vestergaard (Denmark) Christine Busch
Mixed doubles	(Denmark) Jesper Toft (Denmark) Amalie Magelund	(France) Thom Gicquel (France) Delphine Delrue	(France) Julien Maio (France) Léa Palermo

== Men's singles ==
=== Seeds ===
1. (Denmark) Anders Antonsen (withdrew)
2. (Denmark) Viktor Axelsen (withdrew)
3. (France) Alex Lanier (champion)
4. (France) Toma Junior Popov (final)
5. (France) Christo Popov (semi-finals)
6. (Denmark) Rasmus Gemke (third round)
7. (Republic of Ireland) Nhat Nguyen (quarter-finals)
8. (Belgium) Julien Carraggi (second round)

=== Finals ===
Semi-finals
(Croatia) Aria Dinata	11	13
4	(France) Toma Junior Popov	21	21
3	(France) Alex Lanier	21	21	21
5	(France) Christo Popov	15	23	19

Final
4	(France) Toma Junior Popov	17	18
3	(France) Alex Lanier	21	21

=== Top half ===
==== Section 1 ====
First round
(Croatia) A Dinata	21	28
(Norway) M Barth	9	26
(Germany) F Roth	15	23	10
(Finland) J Oldorff	21	21	21

Second round
1	(Denmark) A Antonsen
(Ukraine) O Titov	w	/	o
(Switzerland) J Scheiwiller	20	19
(Croatia) A Dinata	22	21
6	(Denmark) R Gemke	21	22
(Austria) C V Filimon	15	20
(Spain) P Abián	9	20
(Finland) J Oldorff	21	22

Third round
(Ukraine) O Titov	15	7
(Croatia) A Dinata	21	21
6	(Denmark) R Gemke	21	15	0^{r}
(Finland) J Oldorff	18	21	11

Quarter-finals
(Croatia) A Dinata	13	21	21
(Finland) J Oldorff	21	18	19

==== Section 2 ====
First round
(Poland) M Golas	19	21	10
(Sweden) G Bjorkler	21	19	21
(England) E Rose	12	21	21
(Czech Republic) J Louda	21	15	19

Second round
4	(France) T J Popov	21	21
(Estonia) T Kilk	18	8
(Azerbaijan) A R Dwicahyo	21	14	12
(Sweden) G Bjorkler	15	21	21
8	(Belgium) J Carraggi	21	15	23
(Italy) G Toti	18	21	25
(Scotland) C Smith	18	19
(England) E Rose	21	21

Third round
4	(France) T J Popov	19	21	21
(Sweden) G Bjorkler	21	17	14
(Italy) G Toti	21	11	10
(England) E Rose	13	21	21

Quarter-finals
4	(France) T J Popov	21	21
(England) E Rose	9	8

=== Bottom half ===
==== Section 3 ====
First round
(Malta) M Abela	4	15
(Luxembourg) J Pauquet	21	21
(England) H Huang	22	21
(Israel) M Zilberman	20	14

Second round
(Luxembourg) J Pauquet	w	/	o
(Netherlands) J Kweekel
(Azerbaijan) D D Pangestu	13	14
7	(Republic of Ireland) N Nguyen	21	21
(England) H Huang	21	21
(Poland) M Szymanowski	10	14
(Switzerland) T Künzi	13	21
3	(France) A Lanier	21	23

Third round
(Luxembourg) J Pauquet	12	11
7	(Republic of Ireland) N Nguyen	21	21
(England) H Huang	14	18
3	(France) A Lanier	21	21

Quarter-finals
7	(Republic of Ireland) N Nguyen	12	18
3	(France) A Lanier	21	21

==== Section 4 ====
First round
(Finland) K Koljonen	15	21	21
(Portugal) B Carvalho	21	9	13
(Belgium) E Bracke	9	7
(Denmark) M Johannesen	21	21

Second round
(Finland) K Koljonen	21	22
(Slovakia) M Dratva	19	20
(Bulgaria) D Yanakiev	12	20
5	(France) C Popov	21	22
(Denmark) M Johannesen	21	21
(Italy) F Caponio	11	16
(Germany) M Kicklitz	w	/	o
2	(Denmark) V Axelsen

Third round
(Finland) K Koljonen	16	14
5	(France) C Popov	21	21
(Denmark) M Johannesen	15	21	21
(Germany) M Kicklitz	21	13	7

Quarter-finals
5	(France) C Popov	21	21
(Denmark) M Johannesen	14	14

== Women's singles ==
=== Seeds ===
1. (Denmark) Line Kjærsfeldt (champion)
2. (Denmark) Mia Blichfeldt (withdrew)
3. (Scotland) Kirsty Gilmour (final)
4. (Denmark) Julie Dawall Jakobsen (semi-finals)
5. (Denmark) Line Christophersen (quarter-finals)
6. (Ukraine) Polina Buhrova (third round)
7. (Azerbaijan) Keisha Fatimah Azzahra (second round)
8. (Bulgaria) Kaloyana Nalbantova (second round)

=== Finals ===
Semi-finals
1	(Denmark) Line Kjærsfeldt	21	21
4	(Denmark) Julie Dawall Jakobsen	15	9
3	(Scotland) Kirsty Gilmour	21	21
(Hungary) Vivien Sándorházi	11	15

Final
1	(Denmark) Line Kjærsfeldt	21	21
3	(Scotland) Kirsty Gilmour	16	17

=== Top half ===
==== Section 1 ====
First round
(Turkey) R Bodur	12	12
(Bulgaria) S Stoeva	21	21

Second round
1	(Denmark) L H Kjærsfeldt	w	/	o
(Italy) Y Hamza
(France) A Tatranova	16	8
(France) Qi XF	21	21
5	(Denmark) L Christophersen	21	21
(Lithuania) S Golubickaite	12	8
(Estonia) K Kuuba	14	19
(Bulgaria) S Stoeva	21	21

Third round
1	(Denmark) L H Kjærsfeldt	21	21
(France) Qi XF	17	19
5	(Denmark) L Christophersen	21	21
(Bulgaria) S Stoeva	18	17

Quarter-finals
1	(Denmark) L H Kjærsfeldt	22	18	21
5	(Denmark) L Christophersen	20	21	17

==== Section 2 ====
First round
(Hungary) Á Kőrösi	21	21
(Portugal) M Paiva	15	15
(Czech Republic) P Maixnerová	21	21
(Republic of Ireland) S Noble	18	11

Second round
4	(Denmark) J D Jakobsen	21	21
(Germany) M Wilson	17	16
(Israel) H Neiman	21	14	10
(Hungary) Á Kőrösi	14	21	21
6	(Ukraine) P Buhrova	22	21
(Scotland) R Sugden	20	19
(Turkey) Ö Bayrak	21	21
(Czech Republic) P Maixnerová	11	19

Third round
4	(Denmark) J D Jakobsen	21	21
(Hungary) Á Kőrösi	11	12
6	(Ukraine) P Buhrova	21	17	15
(Turkey) Ö Bayrak	15	21	21

Quarter-finals
4	(Denmark) J D Jakobsen	21	21
(Turkey) Ö Bayrak	15	16

=== Bottom half ===
==== Section 3 ====
First round
(Finland) N Nyqvist	18	15
(Czech Republic) T Švábíková	21	21
(Poland) W Dąbczyńska
(Belgium) C Lassaux	w	/	o

Second round
(Czech Republic) T Švábíková	21	21
(Sweden) M Lindgärde	15	12
(Germany) Y Li	21	16	21
7	(Azerbaijan) K F Azzahra	19	21	16
(Belgium) C Lassaux	21	21
(Italy) G Stiglich	15	17
(England) F Redfearn	6	11
3	(Scotland) K Gilmour	21	21

Third round
(Czech Republic) T Švábíková	14	11
(Germany) Y Li	21	21
(Belgium) C Lassaux	11	15
3	(Scotland) K Gilmour	21	21

Quarter-finals
(Germany) Y Li	21	19	8
3	(Scotland) K Gilmour	19	21	21

==== Section 4 ====
First round
(Austria) K Neudolt	7	8
(Switzerland) M Schnider	21	21
(Luxembourg) K Schmidt	7	14
(France) L Huet	21	21

Second round
(Switzerland) M Schnider	17	16
(Spain) C Azurmendi	21	21
(Turkey) N Arın	21	13	21
8	(Bulgaria) K Nalbantova	14	21	18
(France) L Huet	21	21
(Ukraine) Y Kantemyr	18	14
(Hungary) V Sándorházi	w	/	o
2	(Denmark) M Blichfeldt

Third round
(Spain) C Azurmendi	21	21
(Turkey) N Arın	19	19
(France) L Huet	17	21	2
(Hungary) V Sándorházi	21	15	21

Quarter-finals
(Spain) C Azurmendi	11	21	13
(Hungary) V Sándorházi	21	19	21

== Men's doubles ==
=== Seeds ===
1. (Denmark) Kim Astrup / Anders Skaarup Rasmussen (quarter-finals)
2. (England) Ben Lane / Sean Vendy (quarter-finals)
3. (Denmark) Rasmus Kjær / Frederik Søgaard (semi-finals)
4. (France) Christo Popov / Toma Junior Popov (champions)
5. (Denmark) Andreas Søndergaard / Jesper Toft (first round)
6. (Denmark) Daniel Lundgaard / Mads Vestergaard (semi-finals)
7. (Scotland) Christopher Grimley / Matthew Grimley (second round)
8. (France) Éloi Adam / Léo Rossi (final)

=== Finals ===
Semi-finals
6	(Denmark) Daniel Lundgaard (Denmark) Mads Vestergaard	21	18	23
4	(France) Christo Popov (France) Toma Junior Popov	19	21	25
3	(Denmark) Rasmus Kjær (Denmark) Frederik Søgaard	21	14	0^{r}
8	(France) Éloi Adam (France) Léo Rossi	17	21	2

Final
4	(France) Christo Popov (France) Toma Junior Popov	21	18	21
8	(France) Éloi Adam (France) Léo Rossi	12	21	18

=== Top half ===
==== Section 1 ====
First round
(Germany) B Geiss (Germany) J C Völker	21	21
(Spain) R García (Spain) C Piris	16	15
6	(Denmark) D Lundgaard (Denmark) M Vestergaard	21	21
(Iceland) D B Björnsson (Iceland) K D Finnsson	9	16
(Sweden) F Karlborg (Sweden) M Molin	21	21
(Portugal) B Carvalho (Portugal) D Gloria	19	16

Second round
1	(Denmark) K Astrup (Denmark) A S Rasmussen	21	21
(Germany) B Geiss (Germany) J C Völker	18	18
6	(Denmark) D Lundgaard (Denmark) M Vestergaard	21	21
(Sweden) F Karlborg (Sweden) M Molin	9	10

Quarter-finals
1	(Denmark) K Astrup (Denmark) A S Rasmussen	13	15
6	(Denmark) D Lundgaard (Denmark) M Vestergaard	21	21

==== Section 2 ====
First round
(Czech Republic) V Kulíšek (Czech Republic) T Švejda	21	21
(Finland) I Heino (Finland) R Jantti	19	16
7	(Scotland) C Grimley (Scotland) M Grimley	21	21
(Azerbaijan) A Gabilov (Azerbaijan) D D Pangestu	8	6
(Switzerland) Y Orteu (Switzerland) M Q Pham	14	10
(England) C Hemming (England) Et van Leeuwen	21	21

Second round
4	(France) C Popov (France) T J Popov	21	21
(Czech Republic) V Kulíšek (Czech Republic) T Švejda	13	16
7	(Scotland) C Grimley (Scotland) M Grimley	19	19
(England) C Hemming (England) Et van Leeuwen	21	21

Quarter-finals
4	(France) C Popov (France) T J Popov	21	17	21
(England) C Hemming (England) Et van Leeuwen	14	21	14

=== Bottom half ===
==== Section 3 ====
First round
(Belgium) I van Delsen (Belgium) Y van Delsen	8	7
(Bulgaria) I Rusev (Bulgaria) I Stoynov	21	21
(France) M Cattoen (France) L Renoir	12	21	21
5	(Denmark) A Søndergaard (Denmark) J Toft	21	19	18
(Spain) D Franco (Spain) R Sanjurjo	13	12
(Scotland) A Dunn (Scotland) A Pringle	21	21

Second round
(Bulgaria) I Rusev (Bulgaria) I Stoynov	14	15
(France) M Cattoen (France) L Renoir	21	21
(Scotland) A Dunn (Scotland) A Pringle	19	13
3	(Denmark) R Kjær (Denmark) F Søgaard	21	21

Quarter-finals
(France) M Cattoen (France) L Renoir	10	10
3	(Denmark) R Kjær (Denmark) F Søgaard	21	21

==== Section 4 ====
First round
(Germany) D Hess (Germany) M Seidel	21	21
(England) R Easton (England) A Green	14	16
(Republic of Ireland) J Magee (Republic of Ireland) P Reynolds	15	11
8	(France) É Adam (France) L Rossi	21	21
(Netherlands) T van der Lecq (Netherlands) B Wassink	18	12
(Czech Republic) J Král (Czech Republic) O Král	21	21

Second round
(Germany) D Hess (Germany) M Seidel	21	21	17
8	(France) É Adam (France) L Rossi	23	17	21
(Czech Republic) J Král (Czech Republic) O Král	19	8
2	(England) B Lane (England) S Vendy	21	21

Quarter-finals
8	(France) É Adam (France) L Rossi	23	20	22
2	(England) B Lane (England) S Vendy	21	22	20

== Women's doubles ==
=== Seeds ===
1. (Bulgaria) Gabriela Stoeva / Stefani Stoeva (champions)
2. (Ukraine) Polina Buhrova / Yevheniia Kantemyr (quarter-finals)
3. (Scotland) Julie MacPherson / Ciara Torrance (withdrew)
4. (Denmark) Julie Finne-Ipsen / Mai Surrow (quarter-finals)
5. (Turkey) Bengisu Erçetin / Nazlıcan İnci (second round)
6. (Denmark) Natasja Anthonisen / Maiken Fruergaard (final)
7. (Denmark) Amalie Cecilie Kudsk / Signe Schulz (second round)
8. (Sweden) Moa Sjöö / Tilda Sjöö (quarter-finals)

=== Finals ===
Semi-finals
1	(Bulgaria) Gabriela Stoeva (Bulgaria) Stefani Stoeva	21	21
WC	(Netherlands) Debora Jille (Denmark) Sara Thygesen	14	10
6	(Denmark) Natasja Anthonisen (Denmark) Maiken Fruergaard	21	17	21
(France) Margot Lambert (France) Camille Pognante	17	21	12

Final
1	(Bulgaria) Gabriela Stoeva (Bulgaria) Stefani Stoeva	21	21
6	(Denmark) Natasja Anthonisen (Denmark) Maiken Fruergaard	11	16

=== Top half ===
==== Section 1 ====
First round
(Spain) N Carulla (Spain) C M Jiménez	17	21	8
(France) T Margueritte (France) F Vallet	21	9	21
8	(Sweden) M Sjöö (Sweden) T Sjöö	21	21
(Lithuania) J Kavaliauskaitė (Lithuania) J Šalnaitė	10	5
(Italy) M Corsini (Italy) E Piccinin	21	11	23
(Switzerland) C Brand (Switzerland) J Franconville	18	21	21

Second round
1	(Bulgaria) G Stoeva (Bulgaria) S Stoeva	21	21
(France) T Margueritte (France) F Vallet	6	13
8	(Sweden) M Sjöö (Sweden) T Sjöö	21	21
(Italy) M Corsini (Italy) E Piccinin	12	14

Quarter-finals
1	(Bulgaria) G Stoeva (Bulgaria) S Stoeva	21	21
8	(Sweden) M Sjöö (Sweden) T Sjöö	6	12

==== Section 2 ====
First round
(England) S Kelly (England) A Lado	19	19
(Poland) P Hankiewicz (Poland) K Marczak	21	21
7	(Denmark) A C Kudsk (Denmark) S Schulz	21	21
(Czech Republic) S Hořínková (Czech Republic) K Zuzáková	10	11
(Slovenia) A Jordan (Slovenia) K Matovič	10	12
WC	(Netherlands) D Jille (Denmark) S Thygesen	21	21

Second round
4	(Denmark) J Finne-Ipsen (Denmark) M Surrow	21	21
(Poland) P Hankiewicz (Poland) K Marczak	15	8
7	(Denmark) A C Kudsk (Denmark) S Schulz	18	22	9
WC	(Netherlands) D Jille (Denmark) S Thygesen	21	20	21

Quarter-finals
4	(Denmark) J Finne-Ipsen (Denmark) M Surrow	13	13
WC	(Netherlands) D Jille (Denmark) S Thygesen	21	21

=== Bottom half ===
==== Section 3 ====
First round
(Switzerland) L Amiguet (Switzerland) C Racloz	21	20	21
(Netherlands) D Odijk (Netherlands) I van Leijsen	16	22	14
(Latvia) A Kupca (Latvia) J Romanova	10	14
6	(Denmark) N Anthonisen (Denmark) M Fruergaard	21	21
(Bulgaria) M Chepisheva (Bulgaria) T Popivanova	17	13
(Netherlands) K de Wit (Ukraine) M Stoliarenko	21	21

Second round
(Switzerland) L Amiguet (Switzerland) C Racloz	14	20
6	(Denmark) N P Anthonisen (Denmark) M Fruergaard	21	22
(Netherlands) K de Wit (Ukraine) M Stoliarenko	w	/	o
3	(Scotland) J MacPherson (Scotland) C Torrance

Quarter-finals
6	(Denmark) N P Anthonisen (Denmark) M Fruergaard	21	21
(Netherlands) K de Wit (Ukraine) M Stoliarenko	16	8

==== Section 4 ====
First round
(Germany) S Hübsch (Germany) A Lehmann	13	11
(France) M Lambert (France) C Pognante	21	21
(Austria) S Au Yeong (Austria) A Hagspiel	11	9
5	(Turkey) B Erçetin (Turkey) N İnci	21	21
(Republic of Ireland) O Flynn (Republic of Ireland) M Ryan	14	17
(England) A Harris (England) L Tolman	21	21

Second round
(France) M Lambert (France) C Pognante	10	21	21
5	(Turkey) B Erçetin (Turkey) N İnci	21	18	19
(England) A Harris (England) L Tolman	11	8
2	(Ukraine) P Buhrova (Ukraine) Y Kantemyr	21	21

Quarter-finals
(France) M Lambert (France) C Pognante	23	22
2	(Ukraine) P Buhrova (Ukraine) Y Kantemyr	21	20

== Mixed doubles ==
=== Seeds ===
1. (France) Thom Gicquel / Delphine Delrue (final)
2. (Denmark) Jesper Toft / Amalie Magelund (champions)
3. (Denmark) Mads Vestergaard / Christine Busch (semi-finals)
4. (Scotland) Alexander Dunn / Julie MacPherson (quarter-finals)
5. (Netherlands) Robin Tabeling / (Denmark) Alexandra Bøje (quarter-finals)
6. (England) Callum Hemming / Estelle van Leeuwen (quarter-finals)
7. (Germany) Jones Ralfy Jansen / Thuc Phuong Nguyen (quarter-finals)
8. (France) Julien Maio / Léa Palermo (semi-finals)

=== Finals ===
Semi-finals
1	(France) Thom Gicquel (France) Delphine Delrue	21	21
3	(Denmark) Mads Vestergaard (Denmark) Christine Busch	17	18
8	(France) Julien Maio (France) Léa Palermo	14	13
2	(Denmark) Jesper Toft (Denmark) Amalie Magelund	21	21

Final
1	(France) Thom Gicquel (France) Delphine Delrue	18	19
2	(Denmark) Jesper Toft (Denmark) Amalie Magelund	21	21

=== Top half ===
==== Section 1 ====
First round
(Israel) M Zilberman (Israel) S Zilberman	21	21
(Sweden) J Ekman (Sweden) N Wang	19	11
(Republic of Ireland) J Magee (Republic of Ireland) M Ryan	21	19	11
(Scotland) A Pringle (Scotland) R Andrew	14	21	21

Second round
1	(France) T Gicquel (France) D Delrue	21	21
(Israel) M Zilberman (Israel) S Zilberman	4	10
5	(Netherlands) R Tabeling (Denmark) A Bøje	21	21
(Scotland) A Pringle (Scotland) R Andrew	13	13

Quarter-finals
1	(France) T Gicquel (France) D Delrue	21	21
5	(Netherlands) R Tabeling (Denmark) A Bøje	9	14

==== Section 2 ====
First round
(Ukraine) V Yakovlev (Ukraine) P Tkach	16	22	23
(Germany) P Volkmann (Germany) F Volkmann	21	20	21
7	(Germany) J R Jansen (Germany) T P Nguyen	21	21
(Czech Republic) T Švejda (Czech Republic) S Hořínková	10	6
(England) R Easton (England) L Tolman	16	21	21
(Spain) R García (Spain) L Rodríguez	21	16	19

Second round
3	(Denmark) M Vestergaard (Denmark) C Busch	21	21
(Ukraine) V Yakovlev (Ukraine) P Tkach	10	10
7	(Germany) J R Jansen (Germany) T P Nguyen	21	20	21
(England) R Easton (England) L Tolman	15	22	13

Quarter-finals
3	(Denmark) M Vestergaard (Denmark) C Busch	21	21
7	(Germany) J R Jansen (Germany) T P Nguyen	14	18

=== Bottom half ===
==== Section 3 ====
First round
(Serbia) M Tomić (Serbia) A Vitman	21	21
(Estonia) M Õunmaa (Estonia) R Üprus	15	19
(Norway) J Østhassel (Norway) J Abusdal	14	11
8	(France) J Maio (France) L Palermo	21	21
(Sweden) M Svensson (Sweden) R Olyaee	13	19
(Germany) M Bourakkadi (Germany) L Michalski	21	21

Second round
(Serbia) M Tomić (Serbia) A Vitman	9	15
8	(France) J Maio (France) L Palermo	21	21
(Germany) M Bourakkadi (Germany) L Michalski	14	15
4	(Scotland) A Dunn (Scotland) J MacPherson	21	21

Quarter-finals
8	(France) J Maio (France) L Palermo	24	16	21
4	(Scotland) A Dunn (Scotland) J MacPherson	22	21	17

==== Section 4 ====
First round
(Bulgaria) E Panev (Bulgaria) G Stoeva	14	11
(Poland) S Ślepecki (Poland) A Khomich	21	21
(Ukraine) O Titov (Ukraine) Y Kantemyr	7	11
6	(England) C Hemming (England) Es van Leeuwen	21	21
(Azerbaijan) J Alhasanov (Azerbaijan) H Nuriyeva	8	12
(Slovenia) M Ivančič (Slovenia) P Polanc	21	21

Second round
(Poland) S Ślepecki (Poland) A Khomich	13	16
6	(England) C Hemming (England) Es van Leeuwen	21	21
(Slovenia) M Ivančič (Slovenia) P Polanc	5	11
2	(Denmark) J Toft (Denmark) A Magelund	21	21

Quarter-finals
6	(England) C Hemming (England) Es van Leeuwen	17	18
2	(Denmark) J Toft (Denmark) A Magelund	21	21
