= 2026 European Men's and Women's Team Badminton Championships =

Badminton tournament in continental Europe

Tournament details
- Dates: 11–15 February
- Edition: 10
- Venue: Başakşehir Sports Complex
- Location: Başakşehir, Istanbul, Turkey

Champions
- Men's teams: France
- Women's teams: Bulgaria

The 2026 edition of the European Men's and Women's Team Badminton Championships is being held in Istanbul, Turkey, from 11 to 15 February 2026.

== Medalists ==
Event	Gold	Silver	Bronze
Men's Team	France; Éloi Adam; Maël Cattoen; Thom Gicquel; Alex Lanier; Arnaud Merklé; Christo Popov; Toma Junior Popov; Lucas Renoir; Léo Rossi; Enogat Roy	Denmark; Anders Antonsen; Kim Astrup; William Bøgebjerg; Rasmus Gemke; Ditlev Jæger Holm; Magnus Johannesen; Christian Faust Kjær; Rasmus Kjær; Daniel Lundgaard; Anders Skaarup Rasmussen; Mads Vestergaard	England; Nadeem Dalvi; Alex Green; Callum Hemming; Harry Huang; Cholan Kayan; Ben Lane; Kalyan Manoj; Ethan Rose; Zach Russ; Sean Vendy
Men's Team	France; Éloi Adam; Maël Cattoen; Thom Gicquel; Alex Lanier; Arnaud Merklé; Christo Popov; Toma Junior Popov; Lucas Renoir; Léo Rossi; Enogat Roy	Denmark; Anders Antonsen; Kim Astrup; William Bøgebjerg; Rasmus Gemke; Ditlev Jæger Holm; Magnus Johannesen; Christian Faust Kjær; Rasmus Kjær; Daniel Lundgaard; Anders Skaarup Rasmussen; Mads Vestergaard	Sweden; Ludwig Axelsson; Gustav Björkler; Jesper Borgstedt; Joel Hansson; Edvard Hylander; Filip Karlborg; Kim Linell; Mio Molin; Tim Mörk; Oscar Reuterhall; Max Svensson; Gabriel Ulldahl
Women's Team	Bulgaria; Mihaela Chepisheva; Mariya Mitsova; Kaloyana Nalbantova; Gergana Pavlova; Elena Popivanova; Tsvetina Popivanova; Hristomira Popovska; Gabriela Stoeva; Stefani Stoeva	Denmark; Natasja Anthonisen; Mia Blichfeldt; Alexandra Bøje; Line Christophersen; Julie Dawall Jakobsen; Line Kjærsfeldt; Amalie Cecilie Kudsk; Amalie Magelund; Amalie Schulz; Kathrine Vang; Mette Werge	Ukraine; Raiia Almalalha; Anastasiia Alymova; Polina Buhrova; Yevheniia Kantemyr; Sofiia Lavrova; Mariia Stoliarenko
Women's Team	Bulgaria; Mihaela Chepisheva; Mariya Mitsova; Kaloyana Nalbantova; Gergana Pavlova; Elena Popivanova; Tsvetina Popivanova; Hristomira Popovska; Gabriela Stoeva; Stefani Stoeva	Denmark; Natasja Anthonisen; Mia Blichfeldt; Alexandra Bøje; Line Christophersen; Julie Dawall Jakobsen; Line Kjærsfeldt; Amalie Cecilie Kudsk; Amalie Magelund; Amalie Schulz; Kathrine Vang; Mette Werge	Turkey; Neslihan Arın; Özge Bayrak; Yasemen Bektaş; Ravza Bodur; Nisa Nur Çimen; Elifnur Demir; Bengisu Erçetin; Zehra Erdem; Nazlıcan İnci; Aleyna Korkut; İkra Elif Özyiğit; Sinem Yıldız

=== Medal table ===
* Host nation (Turkey)

Rank	Nation	Gold	Silver	Bronze	Total
1	Bulgaria	1	0	0	1
1	France	1	0	0	1
3	Denmark	0	2	0	2
4	England	0	0	1	1
4	Sweden	0	0	1	1
4	Turkey*	0	0	1	1
4	Ukraine	0	0	1	1
Totals (7 entries)		2	2	4	8

== Qualification ==
=== Men's team ===
- Turkey (Host)
- Denmark (Reigning champion)
- France (Highest ranked unqualified team)

Group	Host city	Qualifiers	Failed to qualify
1	(Estonia) Tallinn; Kalev Sport Hall	England	Estonia; Israel; Luxembourg
2	(Germany) Kelkheim; Staufenhalle	Germany	Poland; Belgium; Norway
3	(Czech Republic) Prague; Repy Sports Hall	Finland	Hungary; Bulgaria
3	(Czech Republic) Prague; Repy Sports Hall	Finland	Austria^{§} Czech Republic; Iceland
4	(Republic of Ireland) Dublin; Baldoyle Badminton Centre	Spain	Ireland^{§} Netherlands; Switzerland
4	(Republic of Ireland) Dublin; Baldoyle Badminton Centre	Spain	Italy; Slovakia
5	(Portugal) Caldas da Rainha; Badminton High Performance Sports Centre	Sweden	Azerbaijan^{§} Ukraine; Croatia
5	(Portugal) Caldas da Rainha; Badminton High Performance Sports Centre	Sweden	Portugal; Slovenia

- §: Subgroup winner.

=== Women's team ===
- Turkey (Host)
- Denmark (Reigning champion)

Group	Host city	Qualifiers	Failed to qualify
1	(Bulgaria) Sofia; Badminton hall "Europe"	Bulgaria	Switzerland; Ireland; Portugal
2	(Portugal) Caldas da Rainha; Badminton High Performance Sports Centre	Ukraine	Hungary; Belgium; Azerbaijan
3	(Lithuania) Druskininkai; LSC Sports Complex	France	Israel; Poland; Lithuania
4	(Germany) Kelkheim; Staufenhalle	Germany	Sweden; Finland; Iceland
5	(Estonia) Tallinn; Kalev Sports Hall	Estonia	Spain; Italy; Netherlands
6	(England) Milton Keynes; National Badminton Centre	Czech Republic	England; Slovakia; Slovenia

== Tournament ==
=== Venue ===
This tournament is being held at the Başakşehir Sports Complex in Istanbul, Turkey.

=== Seeds ===
- Men's team
1. Denmark
2. England
3. Finland
4. France
5. Germany
6. Spain
7. Sweden
8. Turkey
- Women's team
1. Bulgaria
2. Czech Republic
3. Denmark
4. Estonia
5. France
6. Germany
7. Turkey
8. Ukraine

=== Draw ===
- Men's team

Group 1	Group 2
Denmark; England; Finland; Spain	France; Germany; Sweden; Turkey

- Women's team

Group 1	Group 2
Denmark; Estonia; Germany; Ukraine	Bulgaria; Czech Republic; France; Turkey

== Men's team ==
All times are Time in Turkey (TRT) (UTC+03:00).

=== Group stage ===
==== Group 1 ====
Pos	Team	Pld	W	L	MF	MA	MD	GF	GA	GD	PF	PA	PD	Pts	Qualification	Denmark	England	Spain	Finland
1	Denmark	3	3	0	15	0	+15	30	3	+27	689	439	+250	3	Knockout stage	—	5–0	5–0	5–0
2	England	3	2	1	8	7	+1	18	16	+2	628	579	+49	2	Knockout stage		—	5–0	3–2
3	Spain	3	1	2	3	12	−9	11	25	−14	554	699	−145	1				—	3–2
4	Finland	3	0	3	4	11	−7	9	24	−15	491	645	−154	0					—

Source: 2026 EMWTBC

===== Denmark vs. England =====
Denmark
5
Başakşehir Sports Complex, Court 3
11 February 2026, 14:30

England
0

			1	2	3
1	(Denmark) (England)	Rasmus Gemke; Harry Huang	21; 12	21; 15
2	(Denmark) (England)	Kim Astrup / Anders Skaarup Rasmussen; Ben Lane / Sean Vendy	21; 9	24; 22
3	(Denmark) (England)	Magnus Johannesen; Cholan Kayan	21; 14	21; 14
4	(Denmark) (England)	Daniel Lundgaard / Mads Vestergaard; Alex Green / Zach Russ	21; 19	21; 11
5	(Denmark) (England)	Ditlev Jæger Holm; Nadeem Dalvi	18; 21	21; 17	21; 13

===== Finland vs. Spain =====
Finland
2
Başakşehir Sports Complex, Court 4
11 February 2026, 14:30

Spain
3

			1	2	3
1	(Finland) (Spain)	Joakim Oldorff; Pablo Abián	11; 21	21; 7	21; 14
2	(Finland) (Spain)	Eliel Melleri / Niilo Nyqvist; Rubén García / Carlos Piris	7; 21	15; 21
3	(Finland) (Spain)	Kalle Koljonen; Álvaro Leal	18; 21	17; 21
4	(Finland) (Spain)	Alvar Melleri / Joakim Oldorff; Jacobo Fernández / Alberto Perals	14; 21	19; 21
5	(Finland) (Spain)	Ananda Galvani Daniswara; Miguel Esteve	19; 21	21; 16	21; 16

===== Denmark vs. Finland =====
Denmark
5
Başakşehir Sports Complex, Court 2
12 February 2026, 14:30

Finland
0

			1	2	3
1	(Denmark) (Finland)	Magnus Johannesen; Joakim Oldorff	21; 12	18; 21	21; 15
2	(Denmark) (Finland)	Ditlev Jæger Holm; Kalle Koljonen	21; 19	21; 14
3	(Denmark) (Finland)	William Bøgebjerg; Eliel Melleri	20; 22	21; 3	21; 9
4	(Denmark) (Finland)	Christian Faust Kjær / Rasmus Kjær; Ananda Galvani Daniswara / Alvar Melleri	21; 17	21; 13
5	(Denmark) (Finland)	Kim Astrup / Anders Skaarup Rasmussen; Eliel Melleri / Niilo Nyqvist	21; 9	21; 3

===== Spain vs. England =====
Spain
0
Başakşehir Sports Complex, Court 4
12 February 2026, 14:30

England
5

			1	2	3
1	(Spain) (England)	Pablo Abián; Harry Huang	6; 21	13; 21
2	(Spain) (England)	Rubén García / Carlos Piris; Ben Lane / Sean Vendy	15; 21	15; 21
3	(Spain) (England)	Álvaro Leal; Cholan Kayan	18; 21	9; 21
4	(Spain) (England)	Jacobo Fernández / Alberto Perals; Alex Green / Zach Russ	21; 23	21; 19	15; 21
5	(Spain) (England)	Miguel Esteve; Nadeem Dalvi	10; 21	12; 21

===== Finland vs. England =====
Finland
2
Başakşehir Sports Complex, Court 2
13 February 2026, 14:30

England
3

			1	2	3
1	(Finland) (England)	Joakim Oldorff; Harry Huang	21; 18	21; 10
2	(Finland) (England)	Eliel Melleri / Niilo Nyqvist; Ben Lane / Sean Vendy	10; 21	6; 21
3	(Finland) (England)	Kalle Koljonen; Cholan Kayan	15; 21	21; 18	21; 14
4	(Finland) (England)	Alvar Melleri / Joakim Oldorff; Callum Hemming / Zach Russ	13; 21	11; 21
5	(Finland) (England)	Ananda Galvani Daniswara; Nadeem Dalvi	25; 23	17; 21	12; 21

===== Denmark vs. Spain =====
Denmark
5
Başakşehir Sports Complex, Court 4
13 February 2026, 14:30

Spain
0

			1	2	3
1	(Denmark) (Spain)	Anders Antonsen; Pablo Abián	21; 5	21; 10
2	(Denmark) (Spain)	Daniel Lundgaard / Mads Vestergaard; Carlos Piris / Rodrigo Sanjurjo	21; 14	21; 15
3	(Denmark) (Spain)	Rasmus Gemke; Álvaro Leal	21; 9	21; 15
4	(Denmark) (Spain)	Christian Faust Kjær / Rasmus Kjær; Jacobo Fernández / Rubén García	21; 15	21; 16
5	(Denmark) (Spain)	Ditlev Jaeger Holm; Miguel Esteve	21; 4	21; 12

==== Group 2 ====
Pos	Team	Pld	W	L	MF	MA	MD	GF	GA	GD	PF	PA	PD	Pts	Qualification	France	Sweden	Germany	Turkey
1	France	3	3	0	14	1	+13	29	5	+24	693	430	+263	3	Knockout stage	—	5–0	4–1	5–0
2	Sweden	3	2	1	6	9	−3	14	21	−7	587	612	−25	2	Knockout stage		—	3–2	3–2
3	Germany	3	1	2	7	8	−1	17	17	0	600	679	−79	1				—	4–1
4	Turkey (H)	3	0	3	3	12	−9	8	25	−17	468	627	−159	0					—

Source: 2026 EMWTBC
(H) Host

===== Sweden vs. Turkey =====
Sweden
3
Başakşehir Sports Complex, Court 1
11 February 2026, 14:30

Turkey
2

			1	2	3
1	(Sweden) (Turkey)	Gustav Björkler; Emre Lale	17; 21	21; 19	8; 17	retired
2	(Sweden) (Turkey)	Filip Karlborg / Max Svensson; Buğra Aktaş / Emre Sönmez	21; 12	15; 21	21; 14
3	(Sweden) (Turkey)	Kim Linell; Yusuf Yaşar	24; 22	12; 21	21; 17
4	(Sweden) (Turkey)	Jesper Borgstedt / Joel Hansson; Taha Emirhan Budak / Gökay Göl	21; 14	21; 17
5	(Sweden) (Turkey)	Gabriel Ulldahl; Mehmet Can Töremiş	24; 26	19; 21

===== France vs. Germany =====
France
4
Başakşehir Sports Complex, Court 2
11 February 2026, 14:30

Germany
1

			1	2	3
1	(France) (Germany)	Alex Lanier; Matthias Kicklitz	21; 12	21; 19
2	(France) (Germany)	Toma Junior Popov; Kian-Yu Oei	18; 21	21; 8	21; 11
3	(France) (Germany)	Éloi Adam / Thom Gicquel; Jonathan Dresp / Simon Krax	14; 21	21; 10	16; 21
4	(France) (Germany)	Arnaud Merkle; Sanjeevi Padmanabhan Vasudevan	21; 11	21; 15
5	(France) (Germany)	Christo Popov / Toma Junior Popov; Bjarne Geiss / Jones Ralfy Jansen	21; 19	16; 21	23; 21

===== Turkey vs. Germany =====
Turkey
1
Başakşehir Sports Complex, Court 1
12 February 2026, 14:30

Germany
4

			1	2	3
1	(Turkey) (Germany)	Emre Lale; Matthias Kicklitz	9; 21	17; 21
2	(Turkey) (Germany)	Buğra Aktaş / Emre Sönmez; Marvin Seidel / Jan Colin Völker	9; 21	13; 21
3	(Turkey) (Germany)	Yusuf Yaşar; Kian-Yu Oei	4; 4			retired
4	(Turkey) (Germany)	Gökay Göl / Mert Seven; Jonathan Dresp / Simon Krax	13; 21	8; 21
5	(Turkey) (Germany)	Mehmet Can Töremiş; Sanjeevi Padmanabhan Vasudevan	13; 21	19; 21

===== France vs. Sweden =====
France
5
Başakşehir Sports Complex, Court 3
12 February 2026, 14:30

Sweden
0

			1	2	3
1	(France) (Sweden)	Christo Popov; Gustav Björkler	21; 12	21; 12
2	(France) (Sweden)	Toma Junior Popov; Tim Mörk	21; 15	21; 8
3	(France) (Sweden)	Éloi Adam / Léo Rossi; Jesper Borgstedt / Joel Hansson	21; 9	18; 21	21; 15
4	(France) (Sweden)	Arnaud Merkle; Gabriel Ulldahl	21; 12	21; 14
5	(France) (Sweden)	Thom Gicquel / Toma Junior Popov; Ludwig Axelsson / Max Svensson	21; 9	21; 14

===== France vs. Turkey =====
France
5
Başakşehir Sports Complex, Court 1
13 February 2026, 14:30

Turkey
0

			1	2	3
1	(France) (Turkey)	Christo Popov; Nurullah Saraç	21; 4	21; 7
2	(France) (Turkey)	Éloi Adam / Léo Rossi; Taha Emirhan Budak / Abdulsamet Özdemir	21; 7	21; 6
3	(France) (Turkey)	Alex Lanier; Veysel Taşdemir	21; 13	21; 8
4	(France) (Turkey)	Thom Gicquel / Toma Junior Popov; Gökay Göl / Mert Seven	21; 5	21; 11
5	(France) (Turkey)	Arnaud Merkle; Arda Doğaç Atan	21; 11	21; 7

===== Sweden vs. Germany =====
Sweden
3
Başakşehir Sports Complex, Court 3
13 February 2026, 14:30

Germany
2

			1	2	3
1	(Sweden) (Germany)	Gustav Björkler; Matthias Kicklitz	27; 25	21; 16
2	(Sweden) (Germany)	Filip Karlborg / Max Svensson; Bjarne Geiss / Jones Ralfy Jansen	13; 21	22; 24
3	(Sweden) (Germany)	Kim Linell; Sanjeevi Padmanabhan Vasudevan	21; 19	19; 21	21; 16
4	(Sweden) (Germany)	Jesper Borgstedt / Joel Hansson; Marvin Seidel / Jan Colin Völker	13; 21	15; 21
5	(Sweden) (Germany)	Gabriel Ulldahl; Aaron Sonnenschein	21; 13	21; 8

=== Knockout stage ===
==== Semi-finals ====
Semi-finals
14 February 17:30
Denmark	3
England	1
14 February 17:30
Sweden	0
France	3

Final
15 February 17:30
Denmark	2
France	3

Denmark
3
Başakşehir Sports Complex, Court 1
14 February 2026, 17:30

England
1

			1	2	3
1	(Denmark) (England)	Anders Antonsen; Harry Huang	21; 9	21; 23	21; 15
2	(Denmark) (England)	Kim Astrup / Anders Skaarup Rasmussen; Ben Lane / Sean Vendy	19; 21	17; 21
3	(Denmark) (England)	Rasmus Gemke; Cholan Kayan	21; 10	21; 20
4	(Denmark) (England)	Daniel Lundgaard / Mads Vestergaard; Callum Hemming / Zach Russ	21; 13	21; 14
5	(Denmark) (England)	Magnus Johannesen; Nadeem Dalvi				not played

Sweden
0
Başakşehir Sports Complex, Court 2
14 February 2026, 17:30

France
3

			1	2	3
1	(Sweden) (France)	Gustav Björkler; Christo Popov	14; 21	8; 21
2	(Sweden) (France)	Tim Mörk; Alex Lanier	11; 21	8; 21
3	(Sweden) (France)	Gabriel Ulldahl; Toma Junior Popov	12; 21	12; 21
4	(Sweden) (France)	Jesper Borgstedt / Joel Hansson; Éloi Adam / Léo Rossi				not played
5	(Sweden) (France)	Ludwig Axelsson / Mio Molin; Thom Gicquel / Toma Junior Popov				not played

==== Finals ====
Denmark
2
Başakşehir Sports Complex, Court 1
15 February 2026, 17:30

France
3

			1	2	3
1	(Denmark) (France)	Anders Antonsen; Christo Popov	21; 12	15; 21	21; 16
2	(Denmark) (France)	Rasmus Gemke; Alex Lanier	16; 21	16; 21
3	(Denmark) (France)	Ditlev Jæger Holm; Toma Junior Popov	22; 20	15; 21	15; 21
4	(Denmark) (France)	Kim Astrup / Anders Skaarup Rasmussen; Éloi Adam / Léo Rossi	21; 18	21; 14
5	(Denmark) (France)	Daniel Lundgaard / Mads Vestergaard; Thom Gicquel / Toma Junior Popov	19; 21	12; 21

=== Final ranking ===
Pos	Team	Pld	W	L	Pts	MD	GD	PD	Final result
1st place, gold medalist(s)	France	5	5	0	5	+17	+32	+337	Champions
2nd place, silver medalist(s)	Denmark	5	4	1	4	+16	+30	+274	Runners-up
3rd place, bronze medalist(s)	England	4	2	2	2	−1	−1	+12	Eliminated in semi-finals
3rd place, bronze medalist(s)	Sweden	4	2	2	2	−6	−13	−86	Eliminated in semi-finals
5	Germany	3	1	2	2	−1	0	−79	Eliminated in group stage
6	Spain	3	1	2	2	−9	−14	−145	Eliminated in group stage
7	Finland	3	0	3	0	−7	−15	−154	Eliminated in group stage
8	Turkey (H)	3	0	3	0	−9	−17	−159	Eliminated in group stage

== Women's team ==
All times are Time in Turkey (TRT) (UTC+03:00).

=== Group stage ===
==== Group 1 ====
Pos	Team	Pld	W	L	MF	MA	MD	GF	GA	GD	PF	PA	PD	Pts	Qualification	Denmark	Ukraine	Germany	Estonia
1	Denmark	3	3	0	12	3	+9	27	7	+20	693	494	+199	3	Knockout stage	—	5–0	4–1	3–2
2	Ukraine	3	2	1	8	7	+1	17	15	+2	545	560	−15	2	Knockout stage		—	4–1	4–1
3	Germany	3	1	2	5	10	−5	12	23	−11	567	659	−92	1				—	3–2
4	Estonia	3	0	3	5	10	−5	12	23	−11	569	661	−92	0					—

Source: 2026 EMWTBC

===== Denmark vs. Ukraine =====
Denmark
5
Başakşehir Sports Complex, Court 2
11 February 2026, 10:30

Ukraine
0

			1	2	3
1	(Denmark) (Ukraine)	Mia Blichfeldt; Sofiia Lavrova	21; 7	21; 9
2	(Denmark) (Ukraine)	Line Christophersen; Anastasiia Alymova	21; 7	21; 11
3	(Denmark) (Ukraine)	Amalie Schulz; Raiia Almalalha	21; 10	21; 15
4	(Denmark) (Ukraine)	Kathrine Vang / Mette Werge; Polina Buhrova / Mariia Stoliarenko	22; 20	15; 21	21; 19
5	(Denmark) (Ukraine)	Amalie Cecilie Kudsk / Amalie Magelund; Raiia Almalalha / Sofiia Lavrova	21; 13	21; 16

===== Germany vs. Estonia =====
Germany
3
Başakşehir Sports Complex, Court 4
11 February 2026, 10:30

Estonia
2

			1	2	3
1	(Germany) (Estonia)	Miranda Wilson; Kristin Kuuba	12; 21	20; 22
2	(Germany) (Estonia)	Selin Hübsch / Amelie Lehmann; Catlyn Kruus / Ramona Üprus	21; 15	21; 17
3	(Germany) (Estonia)	Katharina Nilges; Helis Pajuste	21; 13	12; 21	21; 17
4	(Germany) (Estonia)	Isabel Lohau / Emma Moszczynski; Kristin Kuuba / Helina Rüütel	11; 21	21; 9	21; 18
5	(Germany) (Estonia)	Lisa Paula Bonnemann; Catlyn Kruus	11; 21	21; 12	15; 21

===== Denmark vs. Germany =====
Denmark
4
Başakşehir Sports Complex, Court 2
12 February 2026, 10:30

Germany
1

			1	2	3
1	(Denmark) (Germany)	Mia Blichfeldt; Miranda Wilson	21; 13	21; 12
2	(Denmark) (Germany)	Amalie Cecilie Kudsk / Amalie Magelund; Selin Hübsch / Amelie Lehmann	21; 2	22; 20
3	(Denmark) (Germany)	Julie Dawall Jakobsen; Katharina Nilges	23; 21	21; 11
4	(Denmark) (Germany)	Line Christophersen / Mette Werge; Isabel Lohau / Leona Michalski	13; 21	23; 21	20; 22
5	(Denmark) (Germany)	Amalie Schulz; Lisa Paula Bonnemann	21; 12	21; 8

===== Estonia vs.Ukraine =====
Estonia
1
Başakşehir Sports Complex, Court 4
12 February 2026, 10:30

Ukraine
4

			1	2	3
1	(Estonia) (Ukraine)	Kristin Kuuba; Polina Buhrova	17; 21	19; 21
2	(Estonia) (Ukraine)	Helis Pajuste; Sofiia Lavrova	6; 21	15; 21
3	(Estonia) (Ukraine)	Catlyn Kruus; Mariia Stoliarenko	9; 21	18; 21
4	(Estonia) (Ukraine)	Catlyn Kruus / Ramona Üprus; Polina Buhrova / Yevheniia Kantemyr	15; 21	17; 21
5	(Estonia) (Ukraine)	Kristin Kuuba / Helina Rüütel; Sofiia Lavrova / Mariia Stoliarenko	21; 15	21; 10

===== Germany vs. Ukraine =====
Germany
1
Başakşehir Sports Complex, Court 2
13 February 2026, 10:30

Ukraine
4

			1	2	3
1	(Germany) (Ukraine)	Miranda Wilson; Polina Buhrova	17; 21	18; 21
2	(Germany) (Ukraine)	Katharina Nilges; Yevheniia Kantemyr	14; 21	15; 21
3	(Germany) (Ukraine)	Isabel Lohau / Leona Michalski; Raiia Almalalha / Anastasiia Alymova	21; 8	21; 10
4	(Germany) (Ukraine)	Lisa Paula Bonnemann; Sofiia Lavrova	8; 21	12; 21
5	(Germany) (Ukraine)	Selin Hübsch / Amelie Lehmann; Polina Buhrova / Yevheniia Kantemyr	16; 21	21; 18	13; 21

===== Denmark vs. Estonia =====
Denmark
3
Başakşehir Sports Complex, Court 4
13 February 2026, 10:30

Estonia
2

			1	2	3
1	(Denmark) (Estonia)	Line Kjærsfeldt; Kristin Kuuba	21; 17	21; 17
2	(Denmark) (Estonia)	Line Christophersen; Helis Pajuste	21; 9	21; 7
3	(Denmark) (Estonia)	Amalie Schulz; Catlyn Kruus	21; 10	21; 11
4	(Denmark) (Estonia)	Julie Dawall Jakobsen / Amalie Cecilie Kudsk; Kristin Kuuba / Helina Rüütel	17; 21	21; 15	19; 21
5	(Denmark) (Estonia)	Kathrine Vang / Mette Werge; Catlyn Kruus / Ramona Üprus	19; 21	21; 13	17; 21

==== Group 2 ====
Pos	Team	Pld	W	L	MF	MA	MD	GF	GA	GD	PF	PA	PD	Pts	Qualification	Turkey	Bulgaria	France	Czech Republic
1	Turkey (H)	3	3	0	12	3	+9	24	8	+16	640	448	+192	3	Knockout stage	—	4–1	3–2	5–0
2	Bulgaria	3	2	1	9	6	+3	20	14	+6	599	623	−24	2	Knockout stage		—	4–1	4–1
3	France	3	1	2	7	8	−1	17	18	−1	616	629	−13	1				—	4–1
4	Czech Republic	3	0	3	2	13	−11	6	27	−21	512	667	−155	0					—

Source: 2026 EMWTBC
(H) Host

===== Turkey vs. Czech Republic =====
Turkey
5
Başakşehir Sports Complex, Court 1
11 February 2026, 10:30

Czech Republic
0

			1	2	3
1	(Turkey) (Czech Republic)	Neslihan Arın; Tereza Švábíková	21; 10	22; 20
2	(Turkey) (Czech Republic)	Özge Bayrak; Petra Maixnerová	21; 15	22; 20
3	(Turkey) (Czech Republic)	Zehra Erdem; Tallulah Sharleen van Coppenolle	21; 8	21; 11
4	(Turkey) (Czech Republic)	Neslihan Arın / Yasemen Bektaş; Klára Šilvahá / Tereza Švábíková	21; 10	21; 23	21; 18
5	(Turkey) (Czech Republic)	Bengisu Erçetin / Nazlıcan İnci; Petra Maixnerová / Tallulah Sharleen van Coppenolle	21; 6	21; 14

===== Bulgaria vs. France =====
Bulgaria
4
Başakşehir Sports Complex, Court 3
11 February 2026, 10:30

France
1

			1	2	3
1	(Bulgaria) (France)	Kaloyana Nalbantova; Anna Tatranova	21; 18	21; 19
2	(Bulgaria) (France)	Stefani Stoeva; Rosy Oktavia Pancasari	21; 18	16; 21	21; 11
3	(Bulgaria) (France)	Gergana Pavlova; Leana Laurent	20; 22	21; 17	21; 9
4	(Bulgaria) (France)	Kaloyana Nalbantova / Gabriela Stoeva; Margot Lambert / Camille Pognante	13; 21	21; 19	17; 21
5	(Bulgaria) (France)	Gergana Pavlova / Stefani Stoeva; Elsa Jacob / Flavie Vallet	21; 18	21; 19

===== Bulgaria vs. Turkey =====
Bulgaria
1
Başakşehir Sports Complex, Court 1
12 February 2026, 10:30

Turkey
4

			1	2	3
1	(Bulgaria) (Turkey)	Gergana Pavlova; Neslihan Arın	11; 21	11; 21
2	(Bulgaria) (Turkey)	Tsvetina Popivanova; Özge Bayrak	7; 21	10; 21
3	(Bulgaria) (Turkey)	Gabriela Stoeva / Stefani Stoeva; Bengisu Erçetin / Nazlıcan İnci	21; 11	23; 21
4	(Bulgaria) (Turkey)	Elena Popivanova; Zehra Erdem	7; 21	11; 21
5	(Bulgaria) (Turkey)	Gergana Pavlova / Tsvetina Popivanova; Neslihan Arın / Yasemen Bektaş	11; 21	10; 21

===== Czech Republic vs. France =====
Czech Republic
1
Başakşehir Sports Complex, Court 3
12 February 2026, 10:30

France
4

			1	2	3
1	(Czech Republic) (France)	Tereza Švábíková; Anna Tatranova	21; 16	18; 21	11; 21
2	(Czech Republic) (France)	Petra Maixnerová; Romane Cloteaux-Foucault	21; 10	21; 18
3	(Czech Republic) (France)	Klára Šilhavá / Tereza Švábíková; Agathe Cuevas / Margot Lambert	8; 21	19; 21
4	(Czech Republic) (France)	Lucie Krulová; Rosy Oktavia Pancasari	19; 21	13; 21
5	(Czech Republic) (France)	Petra Maixnerová / Tallulah Sharleen van Coppenolle; Elsa Jacob / Camille Pognante	8; 21	8; 21

===== Turkey vs. France =====
Turkey
3
Başakşehir Sports Complex, Court 1
13 February 2026, 10:30

France
2

			1	2	3
1	(Turkey) (France)	Neslihan Arın; Anna Tatranova	21; 11	21; 12
2	(Turkey) (France)	Yasemen Bektaş / Sinem Yıldız; Margot Lambert / Camille Pognante	13; 21	13; 21
3	(Turkey) (France)	Özge Bayrak; Romane Cloteaux-Foucault	21; 8	21; 12
4	(Turkey) (France)	Neslihan Arın / Nazlıcan Inci; Agathe Cuevas / Elsa Jacob	19; 21	21; 23
5	(Turkey) (France)	Ravza Bodur; Leana Laurent	21; 6	15; 21	21; 15

===== Bulgaria vs. Czech Republic =====
Bulgaria
4
Başakşehir Sports Complex, Court 3
13 February 2026, 10:30

Czech Republic
1

			1	2	3
1	(Bulgaria) (Czech Republic)	Kaloyana Nalbantova; Tereza Švábíková	21; 12	21; 14
2	(Bulgaria) (Czech Republic)	Stefani Stoeva; Petra Maixnerová	21; 15	21; 19
3	(Bulgaria) (Czech Republic)	Gergana Pavlova; Lucie Krulová	21; 18	10; 21	23; 25
4	(Bulgaria) (Czech Republic)	Kaloyana Nalbantova / Gabriela Stoeva; Petra Maixnerová / Tereza Švábíková	21; 18	21; 13
5	(Bulgaria) (Czech Republic)	Tsvetina Popivanova / Stefani Stoeva; Klára Šilhavá / Radka Šilhavá	21; 18	21; 17

=== Knockout stage ===
==== Semi-finals ====
Semi-finals
14 February 10:30
Denmark	3
Ukraine	0
14 February 10:30
Bulgaria	3
Turkey	1

Final
15 February 10:30
Denmark	1
Bulgaria	3

Denmark
3
Başakşehir Sports Complex, Court 2
14 February 2026, 10:30

Ukraine
0

			1	2	3
1	(Denmark) (Ukraine)	Line Kjærsfeldt; Polina Buhrova	21; 19	21; 17
2	(Denmark) (Ukraine)	Mia Blichfeldt; Sofiia Lavrova	21; 12	21; 14
3	(Denmark) (Ukraine)	Line Christophersen; Anastasiia Alymova	21; 14	21; 10
4	(Denmark) (Ukraine)	Amalie Cecilie Kudsk / Amalie Schulz; Polina Buhrova / Yevheniia Kantemyr				not played
5	(Denmark) (Ukraine)	Line Christophersen / Amalie Magelund; Sofiia Lavrova / Mariia Stoliarenko				not played

Bulgaria
3
Başakşehir Sports Complex, Court 1
14 February 2026, 10:30

Turkey
1

			1	2	3
1	(Bulgaria) (Turkey)	Kaloyana Nalbantova; Neslihan Arın	22; 20	16; 21	21; 10
2	(Bulgaria) (Turkey)	Stefani Stoeva; Özge Bayrak	21; 7	21; 18
3	(Bulgaria) (Turkey)	Gergana Pavlova; Zehra Erdem	17; 21	21; 19	10; 21
4	(Bulgaria) (Turkey)	Gabriela Stoeva / Stefani Stoeva; Bengisu Erçetin / Nazlıcan İnci	21; 15	21; 15
5	(Bulgaria) (Turkey)	Mariya Mitsova / Kaloyana Nalbantova; Neslihan Arın / Yasemen Bektaş				not played

==== Finals ====
Denmark
1
Başakşehir Sports Complex, Court 1
15 February 2026, 10:30

Bulgaria
3

			1	2	3
1	(Denmark) (Bulgaria)	Line Kjærsfeldt; Kaloyana Nalbantova	21; 8	20; 22	16; 21
2	(Denmark) (Bulgaria)	Mia Blichfeldt; Stefani Stoeva	20; 22	13; 21
3	(Denmark) (Bulgaria)	Line Christophersen; Gergana Pavlova	21; 9	21; 4
4	(Denmark) (Bulgaria)	Amalie Cecilie Kudsk / Amalie Schulz; Gabriela Stoeva / Stefani Stoeva	11; 21	9; 21
5	(Denmark) (Bulgaria)	Line Christophersen / Amalie Magelund; Mariya Mitsova / Kaloyana Nalbantova				not played

=== Final ranking ===
Pos	Team	Pld	W	L	Pts	MD	GD	PD	Final result
1st place, gold medalist(s)	Bulgaria	5	4	1	4	+7	+13	−3	Champions
2nd place, silver medalist(s)	Denmark	5	4	1	4	+10	+23	+242	Runners-up
3rd place, bronze medalist(s)	Turkey (H)	4	3	1	3	+7	+12	+168	Eliminated in semi-finals
3rd place, bronze medalist(s)	Ukraine	4	2	2	4	−2	−4	−55	Eliminated in semi-finals
5	France	3	1	2	2	−1	−1	−13	Eliminated in group stage
6	Germany	3	1	2	2	−5	−11	−92	Eliminated in group stage
7	Estonia	3	0	3	0	−5	−11	−92	Eliminated in group stage
8	Czech Republic	3	0	3	0	−11	−21	−155	Eliminated in group stage
