= Mads Vestergaard =

Danish badminton player

Personal information
- Born: 11 March 2002 (age 24) Odder, Denmark
- Height: 1.87 m (6 ft 2 in)

Sport
- Country: Denmark
- Sport: Badminton
- Handedness: Right

Men's & mixed doubles
- Highest ranking: 12 (MD with Daniel Lundgaard, 29 September 2026); 18 (with Christine Busch, 15 April 2025)
- Current ranking: 12 (MD with Daniel Lundgaard); 37 (XD with Christine Busch) (17 November 2026)
- BWF profile
Medal record
Men's badminton
Representing Denmark
Thomas Cup
| Bronze medal – third place | 2026 Horsens | Men's team |
European Championships
| Bronze medal – third place | 2025 Horsens | Men's doubles |
| Bronze medal – third place | 2025 Horsens | Mixed doubles |
| Bronze medal – third place | 2026 Huelva | Men's doubles |
European Mixed Team Championships
| Gold medal – first place | 2025 Baku | Mixed team |
European Men's Team Championships
| Gold medal – first place | 2024 Łódź | Men's team |
| Silver medal – second place | 2026 Istanbul | Men's team |
European Junior Championships
| Gold medal – first place | 2020 Lahti | Boys' doubles |
| Gold medal – first place | 2020 Lahti | Mixed team |
| Silver medal – second place | 2018 Tallinn | Mixed team |
| Bronze medal – third place | 2018 Tallinn | Boys' doubles |
| Bronze medal – third place | 2018 Tallinn | Mixed doubles |

Mads Vestergaard (born 11 March 2002) is a Danish badminton player who specialises in doubles play. He claimed two bronze medals at the 2025 European Championships in the mixed and men's doubles. Vestergaard was part of Danish winning team in the 2024 European Men's Team Championships and 2025 European Mixed Team Championships.

Vestergaard was the champion in the boys' doubles at the 2020 European Junior Championships. He also helps the Danish team to win the mixed team title at that competition.

== Career ==
Vestergaard began playing badminton in Beder-Malling Idrætsforening, where his parents also played. At the age of 10, he moved with his family to Højbjerg, where he enrolled in a local badminton club.

Vestergaard won a bronze medal in the mixed doubles and a silver medal in the women's team event at the 2018 European Junior Championships. Two years later in 2020 European Junior Championships, he won the gold medal with partner William Kryger Boe in the boys' doubles and another gold in the team event.

Vestergaard and Christine Busch won their first BWF 100 title at the 2023 Abu Dhabi Masters after defeating the Singaporean pair Terry Hee and Jessica Tan in a rubber game. Shortly after that, the four met again at the 2023 Guwahati Masters, and this time, Busch and Vestergaard had to accept defeat.

In 2026, Vestergaard and Busch reached the quarter-finals in the All England Open by beating World mixed doubles number 1 Feng Yanzhe and Huang Dongping. The next week after, Vestergaard and Lundgaard advanced to the men's doubles final of the Swiss Open but lost out to the Taiwanese twins of Lee Fang-chih and Lee Fang-jen. This pair won their first title at the Malaysia Masters, beating the home pair Goh Sze Fei and Nur Izzuddin.

== Achievements ==
=== European Championships ===
Men's doubles
| Year | Venue | Partner | Opponent | Score | Result |
|---|---|---|---|---|---|
| 2025 | Forum; Horsens, Denmark | (Denmark) Daniel Lundgaard | (France) Christo Popov (France) Toma Junior Popov | 21–19, 18–21, 23–25 | Bronze |
| 2026 | Palacio de los Deportes Carolina Marín; Huelva, Spain | (Denmark) Daniel Lundgaard | (England) Ben Lane (England) Sean Vendy | 19–21, 17–21 | Bronze |

Mixed doubles
| Year | Venue | Partner | Opponent | Score | Result |
|---|---|---|---|---|---|
| 2025 | Forum; Horsens, Denmark | (Denmark) Christine Busch | (France) Thom Gicquel (France) Delphine Delrue | 17–21, 18–21 | Bronze |

=== European Junior Championships ===
Boys' doubles
| Year | Venue | Partner | Opponent | Score | Result |
|---|---|---|---|---|---|
| 2018 | Kalev Sports Hall; Tallinn, Estonia | (Denmark) Mads Muurholm | (France) Fabien Delrue (France) William Villeger | 14–21, 16–21 | Bronze |
| 2020 | Pajulahti Sports Institute; Lahti, Finland | (Denmark) William Kryger Boe | (Russia) Egor Kholkin (Russia) Georgii Lebedev | 21–15, 22–20 | Gold |

Mixed doubles
| Year | Venue | Partner | Opponent | Score | Result |
|---|---|---|---|---|---|
| 2018 | Kalev Sports Hall; Tallinn, Estonia | (Denmark) Christine Busch | (France) Fabien Delrue (France) Juliette Moinard | 19–21, 17–21 | Bronze |

=== BWF World Tour (2 titles, 3 runners-up) ===
The BWF World Tour, which was announced on 19 March 2017 and implemented in 2018, is a series of elite badminton tournaments sanctioned by the Badminton World Federation (BWF). The BWF World Tours are divided into levels of World Tour Finals, Super 1000, Super 750, Super 500, Super 300 (part of the HSBC World Tour), and the BWF Tour Super 100.

Men's doubles
| Year | Tournament | Level | Partner | Opponent | Score | Result | Ref. |
|---|---|---|---|---|---|---|---|
| 2026 | Swiss Open | Super 300 | (Denmark) Daniel Lundgaard | (Chinese Taipei) Lee Fang-chih (Chinese Taipei) Lee Fang-jen | 18–21, 13–21 | (silver) Runner-up | |
| 2026 | Malaysia Masters | Super 500 | (Denmark) Daniel Lundgaard | (Malaysia) Goh Sze Fei (Malaysia) Nur Izzuddin | 21–16, 21–17 | (gold) Winner | |

Mixed doubles
| Year | Tournament | Level | Partner | Opponent | Score | Result |
|---|---|---|---|---|---|---|
| 2023 | Abu Dhabi Masters | Super 100 | (Denmark) Christine Busch | (Singapore) Terry Hee (Singapore) Jessica Tan | 20–22, 21–17, 21–18 | (gold) Winner |
| 2023 | Guwahati Masters | Super 100 | (Denmark) Christine Busch | (Singapore) Terry Hee (Singapore) Jessica Tan | 19–21, 11–21 | (silver) Runner-up |
| 2026 | German Open | Super 300 | (Denmark) Christine Busch | (China) Cheng Xing (China) Zhang Chi | 12–21, 17–21 | (silver) Runner-up |

=== BWF International Challenge/Series (13 titles, 7 runners-up) ===
Men's doubles
| Year | Tournament | Partner | Opponent | Score | Result |
|---|---|---|---|---|---|
| 2019 | Turkey International | (Denmark) Mikkel Stoffersen | (Turkey) Serdar Koca (Turkey) Serhat Salim | 21–19, 21–8 | (gold) Winner |
| 2021 | Portugal International | (Denmark) Emil Lauritzen | (Denmark) Mads Pieler Kolding (Denmark) Frederik Søgaard | 17–21, 18–21 | (silver) Runner-up |
| 2021 | Lithuanian International | (Denmark) Emil Lauritzen | (Ukraine) Danylo Bosniuk (Ukraine) Oleksandar Shmundyak | 21–23, 21–12, 21–18 | (gold) Winner |
| 2021 | Hungarian International | (Denmark) Emil Lauritzen | (England) Rory Easton (England) Zach Russ | 18–21, 21–13, 21–13 | (gold) Winner |
| 2022 | Ukraine Open | (Denmark) Emil Lauritzen | (Malaysia) Chia Wei Jie (Malaysia) Low Hang Yee | 21–19, 20–22, 21–23 | (silver) Runner-up |
| 2023 | Polish Open | (Denmark) Daniel Lundgaard | (Chinese Taipei) Chang Ko-chi (Chinese Taipei) Po Li-wei | 22–20, 16–21, 21–19 | (gold) Winner |
| 2023 | Mexican International | (Denmark) Daniel Lundgaard | (Germany) Bjarne Geiss (Germany) Jan Colin Völker | 22–24, 21–19, 21–17 | (gold) Winner |
| 2023 | Belgian International | (Denmark) Daniel Lundgaard | (Denmark) Andreas Søndergaard (Denmark) Jesper Toft | 13–21, 24–26 | (silver) Runner-up |
| 2023 | Scottish Open | (Denmark) Daniel Lundgaard | (Denmark) Andreas Søndergaard (Denmark) Jesper Toft | 21–15, 11–21, 21–15 | (gold) Winner |
| 2025 | Scottish Open | (Denmark) Daniel Lundgaard | (South Korea) Lee Jong-min (South Korea) Wang Chan | 23–21, 14–21, 21–14 | (gold) Winner |

Mixed doubles
| Year | Tournament | Partner | Opponent | Score | Result |
|---|---|---|---|---|---|
| 2019 | Turkey International | (Denmark) Sofie Nyvang | (Denmark) Mikkel Stoffersen (Denmark) Susan Ekelund | 17–21, 21–18, 13–21 | (silver) Runner-up |
| 2021 | Lithuanian International | (Denmark) Clara Løber | (Kazakhstan) Dmitriy Panarin (Kazakhstan) Kamila Smagulova | 21–12, 21–16 | (gold) Winner |
| 2021 | Hungarian International | (Denmark) Clara Løber | (England) Rory Easton (England) Annie Lado | 18–21, 17–21 | (silver) Runner-up |
| 2022 | Czech Open | (Denmark) Christine Busch | (Chinese Taipei) Chiu Hsiang-chieh (Chinese Taipei) Lin Xiao-min | 21–12, 21–16 | (gold) Winner |
| 2023 | Estonian International | (Denmark) Christine Busch | (Germany) Malik Bourakkadi (Germany) Leona Michalski | 21–13, 21–10 | (gold) Winner |
| 2023 | Polish Open | (Denmark) Christine Busch | (Denmark) Jesper Toft (Denmark) Clara Graversen | 21–15, 21–13 | (gold) Winner |
| 2023 | Denmark Masters | (Denmark) Christine Busch | (India) N. Sikki Reddy (India) Rohan Kapoor | 16–21, 17–21 | (silver) Runner-up |
| 2023 | Nantes International | (Denmark) Christine Busch | (India) Tanisha Crasto (India) Sai Pratheek K. | 14–21, 21–14, 21–17 | (gold) Winner |
| 2023 | Scottish Open | (Denmark) Christine Busch | (Denmark) Jesper Toft (Denmark) Clara Graversen | 21–15, 21–19 | (gold) Winner |
| 2025 | Scottish Open | (Denmark) Christine Busch | (Denmark) Rasmus Espersen (Denmark) Amalie Cecille Kudsk | 21–23, 21–14, 14–21 | (silver) Runner-up |

BWF International Challenge tournament
BWF International Series tournament
BWF Future Series tournament

=== BWF Junior International (2 titles) ===
Boys' doubles
| Year | Tournament | Partner | Opponent | Score | Result |
|---|---|---|---|---|---|
| 2020 | Slovenia Junior International | (Denmark) William Kryger Boe | (Denmark) Jakob Houe (Denmark) Mads Juel Møller | 21–18, 21–13 | (gold) Winner |

Mixed doubles
| Year | Tournament | Partner | Opponent | Score | Result |
|---|---|---|---|---|---|
| 2020 | Slovenia Junior International | (Denmark) Clara Løber | (Denmark) Marcus Rindshøj (Denmark) Mette Werge | 21–11, 26–28, 21–11 | (gold) Winner |

BWF Junior International Grand Prix tournament
BWF Junior International Challenge tournament
BWF Junior International Series tournament
BWF Junior Future Series tournament
