= Aria Dinata =

Croatian badminton player (born 2003)

Personal information
- Nickname: Daniel
- Born: 12 July 2003 (age 23) Jakarta, Indonesia
- Years active: 2016–present

Sport
- Country: Indonesia (2016–2022); Croatia (2023–present)
- Sport: Badminton
- Handedness: Right

Men's singles & doubles
- Highest ranking: 51 (MS, 24 March 2026); 217 (MD with Filip Špoljarec, 5 December 2023)
- Current ranking: 55 (MS, 3 November 2026)
- BWF profile
Medal record
Men's badminton
Representing Croatia
European Championships
Bronze medal – third place	2025 Horsens	Men's singles
Mediterranean Games
Silver medal – second place	2026 Taranto	Men's singles

Aria Dinata (born 12 July 2003) is an Indonesian-born Croatian badminton player. A native of Jakarta, he began representing Croatia in January 2023.

== Career ==
In his junior days, Dinata won the under-15 men's singles title at the Singapore Youth International in 2017. Prior to representing Croatia, he was affiliated with the PB Jaya Raya badminton club.

In March 2023, he finished second with Filip Špoljarec in the men's doubles event at the Giraldilla International. In September 2023, he won his first international title at the Latvia International. He defended his title at the 2024 Latvia International by defeating Valentin Singer in the final. In October 2024, he won his third title at the Algeria International.

He competed in the 2025 European Badminton Championships in February and won Croatia's first ever medal at the European Championships.

== Achievements ==
=== European Championships ===
Men's singles
Year	Venue	Opponent	Score	Result	Ref.
2025	Forum; Horsens, Denmark	(France) Toma Junior Popov	11–21, 13–21	Bronze	

=== Mediterranean Games ===
Men's singles
Year	Venue	Opponent	Score	Result	Ref.
2026	Palazzetto dello Sport; Francavilla Fontana, Italy	(Italy) Fabio Caponio	20–22, 19–21	Silver	

=== BWF International Challenge/Series (4 titles, 6 runners-up) ===
Men's singles
Year	Tournament	Opponent	Score	Result
2023	Latvia International	(Israel) Daniil Dubovenko	15–21, 26–24, 13–9 retired	(gold) Winner
2023	Slovenia Future Series	(Denmark) Jakob Houe	19–21, 19–21	(silver) Runner-up
2023	Croatian International	(Israel) Daniil Dubovenko	18–21, 16–21	(silver) Runner-up
2023	Mexican International	(Guatemala) Kevin Cordón	15–21, 15–21	(silver) Runner-up
2024	Austrian Open	(Indonesia) Prahdiska Bagas Shujiwo	6–21, 18–21	(silver) Runner-up
2024	Latvia International	(France) Valentin Singer	14–21, 21–12, 21–18	(gold) Winner
2024	Algeria International	(Denmark) Søren Hald	21–17, 21–9	(gold) Winner
2026	Valence Alpes International	(India) Rithvik Sanjeevi	21–17, 21–23, 16–21	(silver) Runner-up
2026	Peru International	(Brazil) Jonathan Matias	21–18, 17–21, 21–18	(gold) Winner

Men's doubles
Year	Tournament	Partner	Opponent	Score	Result
2023	Giraldilla International	(Croatia) Filip Špoljarec	(England) Kelvin Ho (Jamaica) Samuel Ricketts	18–21, 21–15, 16–21	(silver) Runner-up

BWF International Challenge tournament
BWF International Series tournament
BWF Future Series tournament

== Performance timeline ==
Key

W	Won	F	Finalist	SF	Semi-finalist
QF	Quarter-finalist	#R	Rounds 4, 3, 2, 1	RR	Round-robin stage
Q#	Qualification round	A	Absent		
G	Gold	S	Silver	B	Bronze
NH	Not held	N/A	Not applicable	DNQ	Did not qualify

To avoid confusion and double counting, these charts are updated at the conclusion of a tournament or when the player's participation has ended.

=== National team ===
- Senior level

Team Events	2025
European Mixed Team Championships	DNQ

=== Individual competitions ===
- Senior level

Events	2024	2025	2026	Ref
European Championships	2R	B	3R	
World Championships	NH	2R	1R	

Tournament	BWF World Tour			Best	Ref
Tournament	2024	2025	2026	Best	Ref
German Open	A		1R	1R ('26)	
Swiss Open	A		Q1	Q1 ('26)	
U.S. Open	A		1R	1R ('26)	
Canada Open	A		2R	2R ('26)	
Hylo Open	A		2R	2R ('26)	
Odisha Masters	1R	A		1R ('24)	
Year-end ranking	117	57		51	
Tournament	2024	2025	2026	Best	Ref
