= 2020 European Junior Badminton Championships – Girls' doubles =

Tournament details
- Dates: 2–7 November
- Venue: Pajulahti Sports Institute
- Location: Lahti, Finland

The girls' doubles tournament of the 2020 European Junior Badminton Championships was held from 2 to 7 November. Bengisu Erçetin and Nazlıcan İnci from Turkey clinched this title in the last edition.

== Seeds ==
Seeds were announced on 16 October.

1. (Russia) Anastasiia Boiarun / Alena Iakovleva (champions)
2. (Spain) Lucia Rodriguez / Ania Setien (first round)
3. (Italy) Katharina Fink / Yasmine Hamza (second round)
4. (Switzerland) Julie Franconville / Caroline Racloz (second round)

== Draw ==
=== Finals ===
Semifinals
1	(Russia) Anastasiia Boiarun (Russia) Alena Iakovleva	21	21
(Denmark) Clara Løber (Denmark) Mette Werge	11	17
(Ukraine) Polina Buhrova (Ukraine) Mariia Stoliarenko	20	10
(Germany) Leona Michalski (Germany) Thuc Phuong Nguyen	22	21

Final
1	(Russia) Anastasiia Boiarun (Russia) Alena Iakovleva	21	21
(Germany) Leona Michalski (Germany) Thuc Phuong Nguyen	12	19

=== Top half ===
==== Section 1 ====
First round
(Estonia) C Kruus (Estonia) R Üprus	w	/	o
(Bulgaria) K Nalbantova (Bulgaria) G Pavlova
(Sweden) J Silvennoinen (Sweden) C Wang	21	21
(Croatia) T Scitkušić (Croatia) L Šaban	16	16
(France) L Jaffrennou (France) A Tatranova	21	21
(Portugal) A Fernandes (Portugal) M Fortunato	11	18

Second round
1	(Russia) A Boiarun (Russia) A Iakovleva	21	25
(Estonia) C Kruus (Estonia) R Üprus	9	23
(Sweden) J Silvennoinen (Sweden) C Wang	16	21	21
(France) L Jaffrennou (France) A Tatranova	21	16	12

Quarterfinals
1	(Russia) A Boiarun (Russia) A Iakovleva	21	21
(Sweden) J Silvennoinen (Sweden) C Wang	10	7

==== Section 2 ====
First round
4	(Switzerland) J Franconville (Switzerland) C Racloz	21	21
(Finland) J Monnberg (Finland) J Salonen	16	14
(Denmark) C Løber (Denmark) M Werge	21	21
(Germany) J Meyer (Germany) A Schaller	8	14
(Spain) A Caballero (Spain) A Carulla	15	18
(Czech Republic) S Hořínková (Czech Republic) K Mikelová	21	21
(Ukraine) P Tkach (Ukraine) O Tykhorskaya	13	17
(Italy) M Corsini (Italy) J Mair	21	21

Second round
4	(Switzerland) J Franconville (Switzerland) C Racloz	12	21	19
(Denmark) C Løber (Denmark) M Werge	21	17	21
(Czech Republic) S Hořínková (Czech Republic) K Mikelová	26	21
(Italy) M Corsini (Italy) J Mair	24	17

Quarterfinals
(Denmark) C Løber (Denmark) M Werge	21	22
(Czech Republic) S Hořínková (Czech Republic) K Mikelová	11	20

=== Bottom half ===
==== Section 3 ====
First round
(Bulgaria) M Chepisheva (Bulgaria) T Popivanova
(Austria) K Pottendorfer (Austria) E Wu	w	/	o
(Russia) E Filippova (Russia) A Shapovalova	19	17
(France) F Vallet (France) E Vercelot	21	21
(Portugal) M Afonso (Portugal) M Neves	16	14
(Ukraine) P Buhrova (Ukraine) M Stoliarenko	21	21
(Scotland) A Campbell (Scotland) E Waddell	12	14
3	(Italy) K Fink (Italy) Y Hamza	21	21

Second round
(Austria) K Pottendorfer (Austria) E Wu	11	10
(France) F Vallet (France) E Vercelot	21	21
(Ukraine) P Buhrova (Ukraine) M Stoliarenko	21	21
3	(Italy) K Fink (Italy) Y Hamza	19	19

Quarterfinals
(France) F Vallet (France) E Vercelot	15	9
(Ukraine) P Buhrova (Ukraine) M Stoliarenko	21	21

==== Section 4 ====
First round
(Finland) S Asfar (Finland) N Nyqvist	9	12
(Germany) L Michalski (Germany) T P Nguyen	21	21
(Serbia) S Loncar (Serbia) A Vitman	17	18
(Denmark) S Pilgaard (Denmark) A S Ryberg	21	21
(Switzerland) L Amiguet (Austria) J Höfle	20	21	24
(Slovenia) L Pipan (Slovenia) T Pipan	22	18	22
(Czech Republic) L Krpatová (Czech Republic) K Zuzáková	21	23
2	(Spain) L Rodriguez (Spain) A Setien	18	21

Second round
(Germany) L Michalski (Germany) T P Nguyen	21	21
(Denmark) S Pilgaard (Denmark) A S Ryberg	19	14
(Switzerland) L Amiguet (Austria) J Höfle	19	16
(Czech Republic) L Krpatová (Czech Republic) K Zuzáková	21	21

Quarterfinals
(Germany) L Michalski (Germany) T P Nguyen	21	21
(Czech Republic) L Krpatová (Czech Republic) K Zuzáková	15	13
