= Mariia Stoliarenko =

Ukrainian badminton player (born 2004)

Personal information
- Born: 30 April 2004 (age 22)

Sport
- Country: Ukraine
- Sport: Badminton

Women's singles & doubles
- Highest ranking: 139 (WS, 15 November 2022); 35 (WD, 3 January 2023); 383 (XD, 30 August 2018)
- BWF profile
Medal record
Women's badminton
Representing Ukraine
European Women's Team Championships
| Bronze medal – third place | 2026 Istanbul | Women's team |
European Junior Championships
| Bronze medal – third place | 2020 Lahti | Girls' doubles |

Mariia Stoliarenko (Ukrainian: Мария Столяренко; born 30 April 2004) is a Ukrainian badminton player. She competed at the 2022 BWF World Championships in the women's doubles with her partner, Yelyzaveta Zharka. She made history with the national team by winning the bronze medal at the 2026 European Women's Team Championships.

== Achievements ==
=== European Junior Championships ===
Girls' doubles
| Year | Venue | Partner | Opponent | Score | Result |
|---|---|---|---|---|---|
| 2020 | Pajulahti Sports Institute; Lahti, Finland | (Ukraine) Polina Buhrova | (Germany) Leona Michalski (Germany) Thuc Phuong Nguyen | 20–22, 10–21 | Bronze |

=== BWF International Challenge/Series (4 runners-up) ===
Women's single
| Year | Tournament | Opponent | Score | Result |
|---|---|---|---|---|
| 2021 | Latvia International | (Ukraine) Polina Buhrova | 13-21, 16-21 | (silver) Runner-up |

Women's doubles
| Year | Tournament | Partner | Opponent | Score | Result |
|---|---|---|---|---|---|
| 2021 | Ukraine International | (Ukraine) Yelyzaveta Zharka | (Germany) Stine Küspert (Germany) Emma Moszczyński | 18–21, 21–19, 15–21 | (silver) Runner-up |
| 2022 | Ukraine Open | (Ukraine) Yelyzaveta Zharka | (Germany) Stine Küspert (Germany) Emma Moszczyński | 18–21, 12–21 | (silver) Runner-up |
| 2025 | Réunion Open | (France) Lilou Schaffner | (Sweden) Moa Sjöö (Sweden) Tilda Sjöö | 21–14, 7–21, 15–21 | (silver) Runner-up |

BWF International Challenge tournament
BWF International Series tournament
BWF Future Series tournament

=== BWF Junior International (2 titles, 2 runners-up) ===
Girls' singles
| Year | Tournament | Opponent | Score | Result |
|---|---|---|---|---|
| 2020 | Swedish Junior International | (Netherlands) Jaymie Laurens | 21-9, 21-15 | (gold) Winner |
| 2021 | Ukraine Junior International | (Ukraine) Polina Buhrova | 13-21, 12-21 | (silver) Runner-up |

Girls' doubles
| Year | Tournament | Partner | Opponent | Score | Result |
|---|---|---|---|---|---|
| 2020 | Polish Junior International | (Ukraine) Polina Buhrova | (Denmark) Simona Pilgaard (Denmark) Anna Siess Ryberg | 13-21, 14-21 | (silver) Runner-up |
| 2021 | Ukraine Junior International | (Ukraine) Polina Buhrova | (Ukraine) Polina Tkach (Ukraine) Olga Tykhorskaya | 21-12, 21-13 | (gold) Winner |

BWF Junior International Grand Prix tournament
BWF Junior International Challenge tournament
BWF Junior International Series tournament
BWF Junior Future Series tournament
