= Başakşehir Sports Complex =

Sport venue in Başakşehir, Istanbul, Turkey

Başakşehir Sports Complex Başakşehir Spor Kompleksi
- Interactive map of Başakşehir Sports Complex; Başakşehir Spor Kompleksi
- Location: Başakşehir, Istanbul, Turkey
- Coordinates: 41.12208°N 28.77478°E
- Owner: Istanbul Metropolitan Municipality (İBB)

Başakşehir Sports Complex (Turkish: Başakşehir Spor Kompleksi) is a multi-purpose indoor arena compound in Istanbul, Turkey.

The venue hosted the 2026 European Men's and Women's Team Badminton Championships.
