= 2020 European Junior Badminton Championships – Boys' doubles =

Tournament details
- Dates: 2–7 November
- Venue: Pajulahti Sports Institute
- Location: Lahti, Finland

The boys' doubles tournament of the 2020 European Junior Badminton Championships was held from 2 to 7 November. Fabien Delrue and William Villeger from France clinched this title in the last edition.

== Seeds ==
Seeds were announced on 16 October.

1. (Russia) Egor Kholkin / Georgii Lebedev (final)
2. (Denmark) Wiliiam Kryger Boe / Mads Vestergaard (champions)
3. (Spain) Jacobo Fernandez / Ruben Garcia (quarterfinals)
4. (Spain) Alejandro de Pablo / Gabriel Fernandez (third round)
5. (Serbia) Sergej Lukic / Mihajlo Tomic (semifinals)
6. (Germany) Kilian Ming-Zhe Maurer / Matthias Schnabel (semifinals)
7. (Denmark) Christian Faust Kjær / Marcus Rindshøj (quarterfinals)
8. (Austria) Gustav Andree / Tobias Rudolf (second round)

== Draw ==
=== Finals ===
Semifinals
1	(Russia) Egor Kholkin (Russia) Georgii Lebedev	21	21
6	(Germany) Kilian Ming-Zhe Maurer (Germany) Matthias Schnabel	19	16
5	(Serbia) Sergej Lukic (Serbia) Mihajlo Tomic	10	16
2	(Denmark) William Kryger Boe (Denmark) Mads Vestergaard	21	21

Final
1	(Russia) Egor Kholkin (Russia) Georgii Lebedev	15	20
2	(Denmark) William Kryger Boe (Denmark) Mads Vestergaard	21	22

=== Top half ===
==== Section 1 ====
First round

Second round
1	(Russia) E Kholkin (Russia) G Lebedev	21	21
(Ukraine) A Don (Ukraine) D Skrynnik	7	14
(Switzerland) M Chanthakesone (Switzerland) N Franconville	15	12
(France) S Leveque (France) A Tores	21	21
7	(Denmark) C F Kjær (Denmark) M Rindshøj	21	21
(Estonia) M Kirisma (Estonia) R Schmalz	6	13
(Scotland) K Cheung (Scotland) M McGuire	14	17
(Finland) R Jäntti (Finland) N Nyqvist	21	21

Third round
1	(Russia) E Kholkin (Russia) G Lebedev	21	21
(France) S Leveque (France) A Tores	5	18
7	(Denmark) C F Kjær (Denmark) M Rindshøj	21	21
(Finland) R Jäntti (Finland) N Nyqvist	15	12

Quarterfinals
1	(Russia) E Kholkin (Russia) G Lebedev	21	21
7	(Denmark) C F Kjær (Denmark) M Rindshøj	15	18

==== Section 2 ====
First round

Second round
4	(Spain) A de Pablo (Spain) G Fernandez	21	21
(Croatia) L Črep (Croatia) B Vadlja	13	14
(Italy) M Massetti (Italy) L Zhou	17	21	21
(Serbia) M Masten (Serbia) N Zupančič	21	15	13
6	(Germany) K M-Z Maurer (Germany) M Schnabel	22	22
(Czech Republic) A Ehm (Czech Republic) T Švejda	20	20
(Switzerland) A Boudier (Austria) K Niederhuber	21	14	21
(Portugal) D Gloria (Portugal) G Rodrigues	14	21	17

Third round
4	(Spain) A de Pablo (Spain) G Fernandez	21	12	15
(Italy) M Massetti (Italy) L Zhou	16	21	21
6	(Germany) K M-Z Maurer (Germany) M Schnabel	21	21	21
(Switzerland) A Boudier (Austria) K Niederhuber	23	16	11

Quarterfinals
(Italy) M Massetti (Italy) L Zhou	21	11	10
6	(Germany) K M-Z Maurer (Germany) M Schnabel	17	21	21

=== Bottom half ===
==== Section 3 ====
First round
(Germany) J Dresp (Germany) J Schlevoigt	20	7
(Russia) V Dobychkin (Russia) A Pechenkin	22	21

Second round
(Russia) V Dobychkin (Russia) A Pechenkin	21	21
(Slovenia) G Bizjak (Slovenia) R Kuprivec	17	19
(Bulgaria) A Halachev (Bulgaria) S Nikolaev
5	(Serbia) S Lukic (Serbia) M Tomic	w	/	o
(Luxembourg) Y Feltes (Luxembourg) J Pauquet	9	10
(France) A Lanier (France) L Renoir	21	21
(Estonia) A Ajupov (Estonia) T Kilk	12	15
3	(Spain) J Fernandez (Spain) R Garcia	21	21

Third round
(Russia) V Dobychkin (Russia) A Pechenkin	21	21	17
5	(Serbia) S Lukic (Serbia) M Tomic	23	13	21
(France) A Lanier (France) L Renoir	18	21	19
3	(Spain) J Fernandez (Spain) R Garcia	21	12	21

Quarterfinals
5	(Serbia) S Lukic (Serbia) M Tomic	21	21
3	(Spain) J Fernandez (Spain) R Garcia	19	10

==== Section 4 ====
First round

Second round
(Sweden) F Karlborg (Sweden) T Söderström	21	21
(Ukraine) V Koluzaiev (Ukraine) V Reva	16	12
(Czech Republic) T Brázda (Czech Republic) M Dostál	22	21
8	(Austria) G Andree (Austria) T Rudolf	20	19
(Portugal) R Dias (Portugal) D Silva	18	17
(Finland) S Emran (Finland) J Kuoppala	21	21
(Italy) A Gozzini (Italy) A Vertua	16	14
2	(Denmark) W K Boe (Denmark) M Vestergaard	21	21

Third round
(Sweden) F Karlborg (Sweden) T Söderström	21	21
(Czech Republic) T Brázda (Czech Republic) M Dostál	18	11
(Finland) S Emran (Finland) J Kuoppala	17	16
2	(Denmark) W K Boe (Denmark) M Vestergaard	21	21

Quarterfinals
(Sweden) F Karlborg (Sweden) T Söderström	16	14
2	(Denmark) W K Boe (Denmark) M Vestergaard	21	21
