= Camille Pognante =

French badminton player (born 2006)

Personal information
- Born: 5 October 2006 (age 20) Grenoble, Auvergne-Rhône-Alpes, France
- Height: 1.68 m (5 ft 6 in)

Sport
- Country: France
- Sport: Badminton
- Handedness: Right

Women's doubles
- Highest ranking: 18 (WD with Margot Lambert, 17 March 2026)
- Current ranking: 40 (WD with Margot Lambert, 3 November 2026)
- BWF profile
Medal record
Women's badminton
Representing France
European Championships
Bronze medal – third place	2025 Horsens	Women's doubles
European Mixed Team Championships
Silver medal – second place	2023 Aire-sur-la-Lys	Mixed team
Silver medal – second place	2025 Baku	Mixed team
European Junior Championships
Gold medal – first place	2024 Ibiza	Girls' doubles
Silver medal – second place	2024 Ibiza	Mixed team

Camille Pognante (born 5 October 2006) is a French badminton player. She won the bronze medal in the women's doubles at the 2025 European Championships.

== Career ==
Pognante affiliated with the Red Star Mulhouse club. In 2020, she reached the final in the girls' doubles at the U15 European Junior Championships, and later a semi-finals finished in the U17 Championships.

In 2023, at the aged of 16, Pognante claimed double title by winning the mixed and girls' doubles at the U19 Alpes International. She was included in the French team at the European Mixed Team Championships, where the team finished runner-up to Denmark.

Partnering Elsa Jacob, she emerged victory at the 2024 European Junior Championships, marking a historic result for French women's doubles in that competition. She also helped her squad to win the silver medal in the team event. She and Jacob reached the final in the Belgian International, losing to Julie MacPherson and Ciara Torrance.

In 2025, together with the French squad, Pognante won the silver medal at the European Mixed Team Championships. Partnered with Margot Lambert, she won the Estonian and Portugal International. In April, Pognante and Lambert won the bronze medal at the European Championships. In October, they claimed their first ever World Tour title in the Hylo Open.

== Achievements ==
=== European Championships ===
Women's doubles
Year	Venue	Partner	Opponent	Score	Result	Ref.
2025	Forum; Horsens, Denmark	(France) Margot Lambert	(Denmark) Natasja Anthonisen (Denmark) Maiken Fruergaard	17–21, 21–17, 12–21	Bronze	

=== European Junior Championships ===
Girls' doubles
Year	Venue	Partner	Opponent	Score	Result	Ref.
2024	Poliesportiu Sa Blanca Dona; Ibiza, Spain	(France) Elsa Jacob	(Denmark) Amanda Aarrebo Petersen (Denmark) Maria Højlund Tommerup	21–17, 21–13	Gold	

=== BWF World Tour (1 title) ===
The BWF World Tour, which was announced on 19 March 2017 and implemented in 2018, is a series of elite badminton tournaments sanctioned by the Badminton World Federation (BWF). The BWF World Tour is divided into levels of World Tour Finals, Super 1000, Super 750, Super 500, Super 300 (part of the HSBC World Tour), and the BWF Tour Super 100.

Women's doubles
Year	Tournament	Level	Partner	Opponent	Score	Result	Ref.
2025	Hylo Open	Super 500	(France) Margot Lambert	(Chinese Taipei) Hsu Yin-hui (Chinese Taipei) Lin Jhih-yun	21–16, 21–10	(gold) Winner	

=== BWF International Challenge/Series (2 titles, 1 runner-up) ===
Women's doubles
Year	Tournament	Partner	Opponent	Score	Result	Ref.
2024	Belgian International	(France) Elsa Jacob	(Scotland) Julie MacPherson (Scotland) Ciara Torrance	9–21, 11–21	(silver) Runner-up	
2025	Estonian International	(France) Margot Lambert	(France) Agathe Cuevas (France) Kathell Desmots-Chacun	21–15, 21–18	(gold) Winner	
2025	Portugal International	(France) Margot Lambert	(Denmark) Simona Pilgaard (Denmark) Mette Werge	Walkover	(gold) Winner	

BWF International Challenge tournament
BWF International Series tournament
BWF Future Series tournament
