= Margot Lambert =

French badminton player (born 1999)

Personal information
- Born: 15 March 1999 (age 27) Guilherand-Granges, Ardèche, France
- Height: 1.63 m (5 ft 4 in)

Sport
- Country: France
- Sport: Badminton
- Handedness: Right

Women's & mixed doubles
- Highest ranking: 13 (WD with Anne Tran, 27 August 2024); 52 (XD with Éloi Adam, 4 May 2021)
- Current ranking: 40 (WD with Camille Pognante, 3 November 2026)
- BWF profile
Medal record
Women's badminton
Representing France
European Games
Bronze medal – third place	2023 Kraków–Małopolska	Women's doubles
European Championships
Gold medal – first place	2024 Saarbrücken	Women's doubles
Bronze medal – third place	2025 Horsens	Women's doubles
European Women's Team Championships
Bronze medal – third place	2020 Liévin	Women's team
European Mixed Team Championships
Silver medal – second place	2021 Vantaa	Mixed team
Silver medal – second place	2023 Aire-sur-la-Lys	Mixed team
Silver medal – second place	2025 Baku	Mixed team
European Junior Championships
Gold medal – first place	2017 Mulhouse	Mixed team
Bronze medal – third place	2015 Lubin	Mixed team

Margot Lambert (French: [maʁɡo lɑ̃bɛʁ]; born 15 March 1999) is a French badminton player. She won the gold medal in the women's doubles at the 2024 European Championships. Lambert started playing badminton at the age of 8 in Tahiti, and now affiliates with Club de l'Hermitage et du Tournonais. She was part of the national team that won the gold medal at the 2017 European Junior Championships. Lambert was the women's doubles National Champions in 2020.

== Early life ==
Lambert was born in Guilherand-Granges, Ardèche. She first discovered badminton when she was in Tahiti, at the age of 8. Her parents were transferred in Tahiti as a gym teacher. Seeing her parents playing badminton, she gave it a try. In there, she played more as a hobby, as there was no coach in the club she was in. Four years later, when she returned to France, she started playing in a more sporting way, with regular training sessions.

== Career ==
In 2020, she helps the national team won a bronze medal after finish as the semi-finalists in the European Women's Team Championships.

In 2023, Lambert competed in the European Games, and captured the bronze medal in the women's doubles partnering Tran.

In 2024, Lambert and Tran made a history by becoming the first ever French women's doubles to win the European Championships.

In 2025, partnered with Camille Pognante, she won the bronze medal at the European Championships.

== Achievements ==
=== European Games ===
Women's doubles
Year	Venue	Partner	Opponent	Score	Result	Ref.
2023	Arena Jaskółka; Tarnów, Poland	(France) Anne Tran	(Bulgaria) Gabriela Stoeva (Bulgaria) Stefani Stoeva	21–17, 14–21, 12–21	Bronze	

=== European Championships ===
Women's doubles
Year	Venue	Partner	Opponent	Score	Result	Ref.
2024	Saarlandhalle, Saarbrücken, Germany	(France) Anne Tran	(Bulgaria) Gabriela Stoeva (Bulgaria) Stefani Stoeva	16–21, 21–17, 21–11	Gold	
2025	Forum, Horsens, Denmark	(France) Camille Pognante	(Denmark) Natasja Anthonisen (Denmark) Maiken Fruergaard	17–21, 21–17, 12–21	Bronze	

=== BWF World Tour (1 title) ===
The BWF World Tour, which was announced on 19 March 2017 and implemented in 2018, is a series of elite badminton tournaments sanctioned by the Badminton World Federation (BWF). The BWF World Tour is divided into levels of World Tour Finals, Super 1000, Super 750, Super 500, Super 300 (part of the HSBC World Tour), and the BWF Tour Super 100.

Women's doubles
Year	Tournament	Level	Partner	Opponent	Score	Result
2025	Hylo Open	Super 500	(France) Camille Pognante	(Chinese Taipei) Hsu Yin-hui (Chinese Taipei) Lin Jhih-yun	21–16, 21–10	(gold) Winner

=== BWF International Challenge/Series (9 titles, 5 runners-up) ===
Women's doubles
Year	Tournament	Partner	Opponent	Score	Result
2015	Riga International	(France) Vimala Hériau	(Estonia) Kristin Kuuba (Estonia) Helina Rüütel	22–20, 17–21, 12–21	(silver) Runner-up
2018	Hellas Open	(France) Vimala Hériau	(India) Rutaparna Panda (India) Arathi Sara Sunil	19–21, 12–21	(silver) Runner-up
2019	Hellas Open	(France) Vimala Hériau	(Ukraine) Anastasiya Prozorova (Ukraine) Valeriya Rudakova	21–13, 21–16	(gold) Winner
2020	Estonian International	(France) Vimala Hériau	(Japan) Rena Miyaura (Japan) Saori Ozaki	18–21, 18–21	(silver) Runner-up
2020	Swedish Open	(France) Vimala Hériau	(Denmark) Julie Finne-Ipsen (Denmark) Mai Surrow	20–22, 20–22	(silver) Runner-up
2021	Polish International	(France) Anne Tran	(India) Treesa Jolly (India) Gayathri Gopichand	21–10, 21–18	(gold) Winner
2021	Welsh International	(France) Anne Tran	(India) Treesa Jolly (India) Gayathri Gopichand	22–20, 17–21, 21–14	(gold) Winner
2022	Welsh International	(France) Anne Tran	(England) Chloe Birch (England) Lauren Smith	9–21, 21–14, 21–9	(gold) Winner
2023	Réunion Open	(France) Anne Tran	(Japan) Natsumi Takasaki (Japan) Mai Tanabe	14–21, 21–14, 21–10	(gold) Winner
2025	Estonian International	(France) Camille Pognante	(France) Agathe Cuevas (France) Kathell Desmots-Chacun	21–15, 21–18	(gold) Winner
2025	Portugal International	(France) Camille Pognante	(Denmark) Simona Pilgaard (Denmark) Mette Werge	Walkover	(gold) Winner

Mixed doubles
Year	Tournament	Partner	Opponent	Score	Result
2025	Estonian International	(France) Grégoire Deschamps	(England) Ethan van Leeuwen (England) Abbygael Harris	11–21, 14–21	(silver) Runner-up
2025	Swedish Open	(France) Grégoire Deschamps	(Denmark) Kristoffer Kolding (Denmark) Mette Werge	21–18, 21–18	(gold) Winner
2025	Portugal International	(France) Grégoire Deschamps	(France) Natan Begga (France) Téa Margueritte	21–14, 21–14	(gold) Winner

BWF International Challenge tournament
BWF International Series tournament
BWF Future Series tournament
