= 2020 European Junior Badminton Championships =

Tournament details
- Dates: 29 October – 7 November 2020
- Venue: Pajulahti Sports Institute
- Location: Lahti, Finland

The 2020 European Junior Badminton Championships was held at the Pajulahti Sports Institute in Lahti, Finland from 29 October to 7 November 2020 to crown the best U-19 badminton players across Europe.

== Tournament ==
The 2020 European Junior Badminton Championships was organized by Badminton Europe. This tournament consists of team and individual events. There are 16 teams competing in the mixed team event, which is being held from 29 October to 2 November, while the individual events will be held from 2 to 7 November. Lithuania had to withdraw from the tournament due to one of the team member testing positive for COVID-19.

=== Venue ===
This international tournament is being held at Pajulahti Sports Institute in Lahti, Finland.

== Medal summary ==
=== Medalists ===
Event	Gold	Silver	Bronze
Teams	Denmark; William Kryger Boe; Magnus Johannesen; Christian Faust Kjær; Mads Juel Møller; Marcus Rindshøj; Mads Vestergaard; Christopher Vittoriani; Clara Løber; Emilia Nesic; Frederikke Østergaard; Simona Pilgaard; Anna Siess Ryberg; Benedicte Sillassen; Mette Werge	France; Yanis Gaudin; Nicolas Hoareau; Alex Lanier; Sacha Leveque; Kimi Lovang; Christo Popov; Lucas Renoir; Aymeric Tores; Leo van Gysel; Marie Cesari; Alison Drouard; Emilie Drouin; Laeticia Jaffrennou; Téa Margueritte; Floriane Nurit; Anna Tatranova; Flavie Vallet; Emilie Vercelot	Estonia; Artur Ajupov; Tauri Kilk; Mario Kirisma; Oskar Männik; Steven Pärnasalu; Robin Schmalz; Rannar Zirk; Elisaveta Berik; Andra Mai Hoop; Kadi Ilves; Katriin Jagomägi; Catlyn Kruus; Emili Pärsim; Marelle Salu; Marta Emili Teller; Ramona Üprus
Teams	Denmark; William Kryger Boe; Magnus Johannesen; Christian Faust Kjær; Mads Juel Møller; Marcus Rindshøj; Mads Vestergaard; Christopher Vittoriani; Clara Løber; Emilia Nesic; Frederikke Østergaard; Simona Pilgaard; Anna Siess Ryberg; Benedicte Sillassen; Mette Werge	France; Yanis Gaudin; Nicolas Hoareau; Alex Lanier; Sacha Leveque; Kimi Lovang; Christo Popov; Lucas Renoir; Aymeric Tores; Leo van Gysel; Marie Cesari; Alison Drouard; Emilie Drouin; Laeticia Jaffrennou; Téa Margueritte; Floriane Nurit; Anna Tatranova; Flavie Vallet; Emilie Vercelot	Russia; Lev Barinov; Vladislav Dobychkin; Egor Kholkin; Georgii Lebedev; Artur Pechenkin; Igor Pushkarev; Egor Velp; Anastasiia Boiarun; Elena Filippova; Regina Galiakhmetova; Mariia Golubeva; Alena Iakovleva; Vasilisa Kuznetcova; Anastasiia Shapovalova
Boys' singles	(France) Christo Popov	(France) Yanis Gaudin	(Germany) Matthias Kicklitz
Boys' singles	(France) Christo Popov	(France) Yanis Gaudin	(Finland) Joakim Oldorff
Girls' singles	(Russia) Anastasiia Shapovalova	(Sweden) Edith Urell	(Serbia) Marija Sudimac
Girls' singles	(Russia) Anastasiia Shapovalova	(Sweden) Edith Urell	(Finland) Nella Nyqvist
Boys' doubles	(Denmark) William Kryger Boe (Denmark) Mads Vestergaard	(Russia) Egor Kholkin (Russia) Georgii Lebedev	(Germany) Kilian Ming-Zhe Maurer (Germany) Matthias Schnabel
Boys' doubles	(Denmark) William Kryger Boe (Denmark) Mads Vestergaard	(Russia) Egor Kholkin (Russia) Georgii Lebedev	(Serbia) Sergej Lukić (Serbia) Mihajlo Tomić
Girls' doubles	(Russia) Anastasiia Boiarun (Russia) Alena Iakovleva	(Germany) Leona Michalski (Germany) Thuc Phuong Nguyen	(Denmark) Clara Løber (Denmark) Mette Werge
Girls' doubles	(Russia) Anastasiia Boiarun (Russia) Alena Iakovleva	(Germany) Leona Michalski (Germany) Thuc Phuong Nguyen	(Ukraine) Polina Buhrova (Ukraine) Mariia Stoliarenko
Mixed doubles	(Germany) Matthias Kicklitz (Germany) Thuc Phuong Nguyen	(Sweden) Gustav Bjorkler (Sweden) Edith Urell	(Russia) Lev Barinov (Russia) Anastasiia Boiarun
Mixed doubles	(Germany) Matthias Kicklitz (Germany) Thuc Phuong Nguyen	(Sweden) Gustav Bjorkler (Sweden) Edith Urell	(France) Christo Popov (France) Flavie Vallet

=== Medal table ===
* Host nation (Finland)

Rank	Nation	Gold	Silver	Bronze	Total
1	Russia	2	1	2	5
2	Denmark	2	0	1	3
3	France	1	2	1	4
4	Germany	1	1	2	4
5	Sweden	0	2	0	2
6	Finland*	0	0	2	2
6	Serbia	0	0	2	2
8	Estonia	0	0	1	1
8	Ukraine	0	0	1	1
Totals (9 entries)		6	6	12	24

== Team event ==
=== Seeds ===
1. Denmark
2. Russia
3. Serbia
4. France
5. Germany
6. Czech Republic
7. Ukraine
8. Spain

=== Group stage ===
==== Group 1 ====
Pos	Team	Pld	W	L	MF	MA	MD	GF	GA	GD	PF	PA	PD	Pts	Qualification	Denmark	Germany	Finland	Faroe Islands
1	Denmark	3	3	0	11	4	+7	24	8	+16	644	451	+193	3	Advance to knockout stage	—	3–2	3–2	5–0
2	Germany	3	2	1	11	4	+7	22	10	+12	614	483	+131	2	Advance to knockout stage		—	4–1	5–0
3	Finland	3	1	2	8	7	+1	17	16	+1	551	531	+20	1				—	5–0
4	Faroe Islands	3	0	3	0	15	−15	1	30	−29	301	645	−344	0					—

Source: TS

==== Group 2 ====
Pos	Team	Pld	W	L	MF	MA	MD	GF	GA	GD	PF	PA	PD	Pts	Qualification	Russia	Sweden	Czech Republic	Portugal
1	Russia	3	3	0	10	5	+5	22	11	+11	655	554	+101	3	Advance to knockout stage	—	4–1	3–2	4–1
2	Sweden	3	2	1	10	5	+5	21	13	+8	642	589	+53	2	Advance to knockout stage		—	4–1	3–2
3	Czech Republic	3	1	2	7	8	−1	17	17	0	625	581	+44	1				—	4–1
4	Portugal	3	0	3	3	12	−9	7	26	−19	462	660	−198	0					—

Source: TS

==== Group 3 ====
Lithuania was originally drawn to Group 3, but withdrawn due to one of the team member tested positive for COVID-19.

Pos	Team	Pld	W	L	MF	MA	MD	GF	GA	GD	PF	PA	PD	Pts	Qualification	Spain	Serbia	Italy
1	Spain	2	2	0	7	3	+4	15	10	+5	455	449	+6	2	Advance to knockout stage	—	3–2	4–1
2	Serbia	2	1	1	6	4	+2	14	9	+5	442	367	+75	1	Advance to knockout stage		—	4–1
3	Italy	2	0	2	2	8	−6	6	16	−10	348	429	−81	0				—

Source: TS

==== Group 4 ====
Pos	Team	Pld	W	L	MF	MA	MD	GF	GA	GD	PF	PA	PD	Pts	Qualification	France	Estonia	Ukraine	Switzerland	Slovenia
1	France	4	4	0	17	3	+14	36	9	+27	919	678	+241	4	Advance to knockout stage	—	5–0	3–2	4–1	5–0
2	Estonia	4	3	1	12	8	+4	26	19	+7	840	786	+54	3	Advance to knockout stage		—	4–1	3–2	5–0
3	Ukraine	4	2	2	12	8	+4	27	20	+7	858	854	+4	2				—	4–1	5–0
4	Switzerland	4	1	3	8	12	−4	17	27	−10	756	829	−73	1					—	4–1
5	Slovenia	4	0	4	1	19	−18	7	38	−31	680	906	−226	0						—

Source: TS

=== Knockout stage ===
Quarter-finals
Denmark	3
Sweden	0
Spain	2
Estonia	3
Serbia	0
France	3
Germany	1
Russia	3

Semi-finals
Denmark	3
Estonia	0
France	3
Russia	1

Final
Denmark	3
France	0
