= Forum Horsens =

Indoor sports arena and music venue in Horsens, Denmark

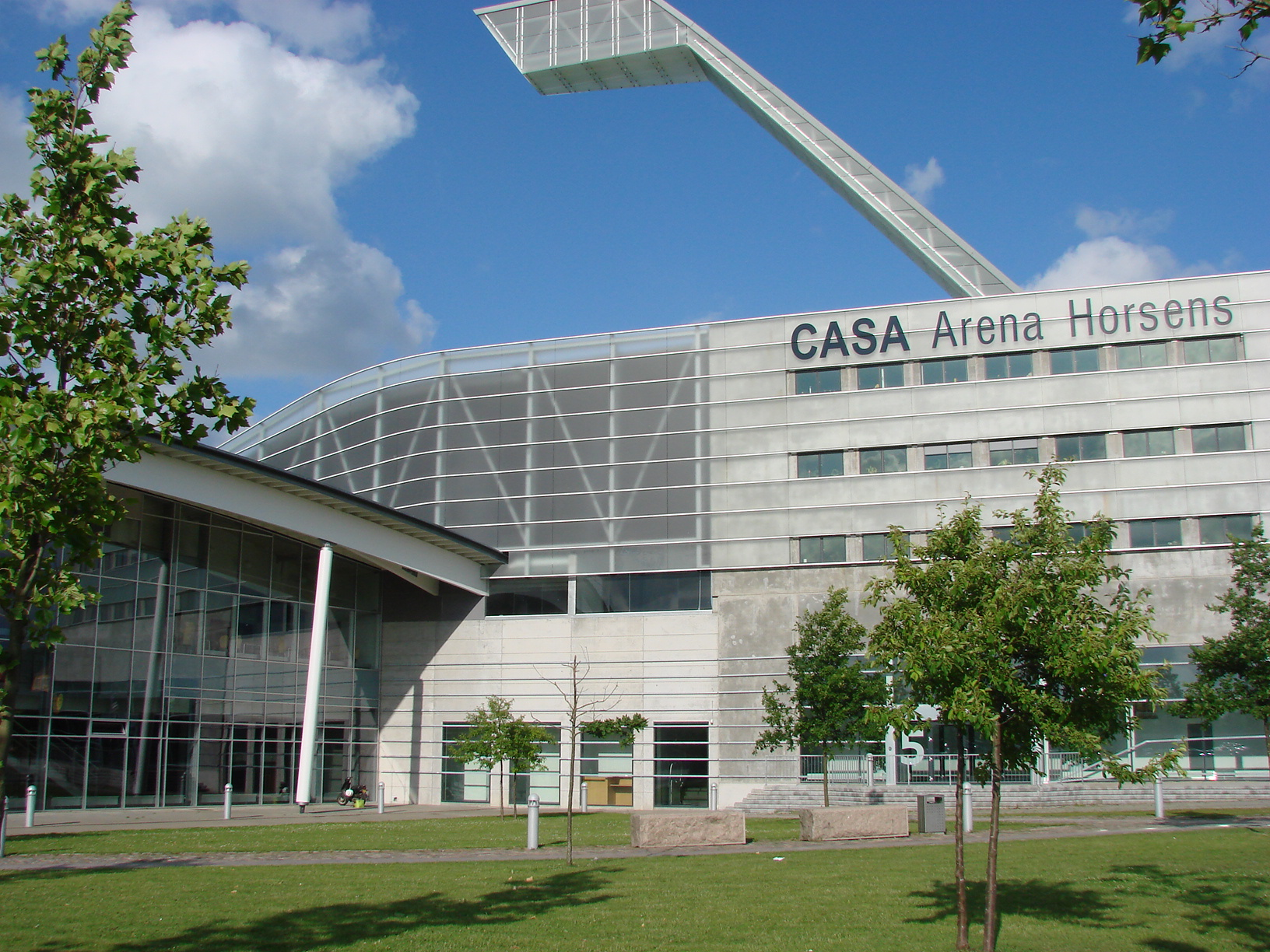
- Forum Horsens (left) next to the larger Forum Horsens Stadium
- Interactive map of Forum Horsens
- Location: Horsens, Denmark
- Coordinates: 55°52′19″N 9°51′19″E
- Owner: Horsens Municipality
- Capacity: 4,500

Construction
- Opened: 1990; 4 September 2004 (current design)
- Expanded: 2004
- Architect: KHR Architecture

Forum Horsens is an indoor sports arena and music venue in Horsens, Denmark. The arena was originally known as Parkhallen and opened in 1990, before being expanded with a bigger hall and swimming facilities (Aqua Forum) in 2004. It seats 4,000 spectators for sports events, and for concerts there can be 4,500 sitting or 5,000 standing. It is adjacent to the larger Forum Horsens Arena stadium. The venue has been used to host Dansk Melodi Grand Prix several times, including in 2005, 2007, 2008, and 2016.
