= 2024 European Badminton Championships =

Tournament details
- Dates: April 8, 2024 – April 14, 2024
- Venue: Saarlandhalle
- Location: Saarbrücken, Germany

Champions
- Men's singles: (Denmark) Anders Antonsen
- Women's singles: (Spain) Carolina Marín
- Men's doubles: (Denmark) Kim Astrup (Denmark) Anders Skaarup Rasmussen
- Women's doubles: (France) Margot Lambert (France) Anne Tran
- Mixed doubles: (France) Thom Gicquel (France) Delphine Delrue

The 2024 European Badminton Championships was the 30th tournament of the European Badminton Championships. It was held in Saarbrücken, Germany, from 8 to 14 April 2024.

== Tournament ==
The 2024 European Badminton Championships was the 30th edition of the championships. The tournament was organized by the Badminton Europe with the local organizer German Badminton Association and sanctioned by the BWF.

The tournament consisted of men's (singles and doubles), women's (singles and doubles), and mixed doubles.

=== Venue ===
The tournament was held at the Saarlandhalle in Saarbrücken, Germany.

=== Point distribution ===
Below are the tables with the point distribution for each phase of the tournament based on the BWF points system for the European Badminton Championships, which is equivalent to a Super 500 event.

Winner	Runner-up	3/4	5/8	9/16	17/32	33/64
9,200	7,800	6,420	5,040	3,600	2,220	880

== Medal summary ==
=== Medalists ===
Event	Gold	Silver	Bronze
Men's singles	(Denmark) Anders Antonsen	(France) Toma Junior Popov	(Denmark) Viktor Axelsen
Men's singles	(Denmark) Anders Antonsen	(France) Toma Junior Popov	(Finland) Joakim Oldorff
Women's singles	(Spain) Carolina Marín	(Scotland) Kirsty Gilmour	(Denmark) Julie Dawall Jakobsen
Women's singles	(Spain) Carolina Marín	(Scotland) Kirsty Gilmour	(Turkey) Neslihan Arın
Men's doubles	(Denmark) Kim Astrup (Denmark) Anders Skaarup Rasmussen	(Denmark) Andreas Søndergaard (Denmark) Jesper Toft	(England) Ben Lane (England) Sean Vendy
Men's doubles	(Denmark) Kim Astrup (Denmark) Anders Skaarup Rasmussen	(Denmark) Andreas Søndergaard (Denmark) Jesper Toft	(Denmark) Rasmus Kjær (Denmark) Frederik Søgaard
Women's doubles	(France) Margot Lambert (France) Anne Tran	(Bulgaria) Gabriela Stoeva (Bulgaria) Stefani Stoeva	(Turkey) Bengisu Erçetin (Turkey) Nazlıcan İnci
Women's doubles	(France) Margot Lambert (France) Anne Tran	(Bulgaria) Gabriela Stoeva (Bulgaria) Stefani Stoeva	(Netherlands) Debora Jille (Netherlands) Cheryl Seinen
Mixed doubles	(France) Thom Gicquel (France) Delphine Delrue	(Denmark) Mathias Christiansen (Denmark) Alexandra Bøje	(Netherlands) Robin Tabeling (Netherlands) Selena Piek
Mixed doubles	(France) Thom Gicquel (France) Delphine Delrue	(Denmark) Mathias Christiansen (Denmark) Alexandra Bøje	(Denmark) Mathias Thyrri (Denmark) Amalie Magelund

=== Medal table ===
* Host nation (Germany)

Rank	Nation	Gold	Silver	Bronze	Total
1	Denmark	2	2	4	8
2	France	2	1	0	3
3	Spain	1	0	0	1
4	Bulgaria	0	1	0	1
4	Scotland	0	1	0	1
6	Netherlands	0	0	2	2
6	Turkey	0	0	2	2
8	England	0	0	1	1
8	Finland	0	0	1	1
Totals (9 entries)		5	5	10	20

== Men's singles ==
=== Seeds ===
1. (Denmark) Viktor Axelsen (semi-finals)
2. (Denmark) Anders Antonsen (champion)
3. (France) Christo Popov (second round)
4. (France) Toma Junior Popov (final)
5. (Denmark) Rasmus Gemke (quarter-finals)
6. (Denmark) Magnus Johannesen (third round)
7. (Republic of Ireland) Nhat Nguyen (third round)
8. (Belgium) Julien Carraggi (third round)

=== Finals ===
Semi-finals
1	(Denmark) Viktor Axelsen	19	21	9
4	(France) Toma Junior Popov	21	17	21
(Finland) Joakim Oldorff	11	11
2	(Denmark) Anders Antonsen	21	21

Final
4	(France) Toma Junior Popov	18	13
2	(Denmark) Anders Antonsen	21	21

=== Top half ===
==== Section 1 ====
First round
(Finland) K Koljonen	21	21
(Sweden) G Björkler	18	16
(Italy) F Caponio	17	16
(Switzerland) T Künzi	21	21

Second round
1	(Denmark) V Axelsen	21	21
(Germany) K Schäfer	12	12
(Croatia) A Dinata	15	15
(Finland) K Koljonen	21	21
5	(Denmark) R Gemke	21	16	21
(England) H Huang	12	21	13
(Estonia) K Kert	18	11
(Switzerland) T Künzi	21	21

Third round
1	(Denmark) V Axelsen	21	21
(Finland) K Koljonen	14	9
5	(Denmark) R Gemke	21	21
(Switzerland) T Künzi	15	11

Quarter-finals
1	(Denmark) V Axelsen	21	21
5	(Denmark) R Gemke	19	12

==== Section 2 ====
First round
(Poland) M Szymanowski	21	17	13
(Netherlands) J Kweekel	17	21	21
(Bulgaria) D Yanakiev	10	18
(Azerbaijan) A R Dwicahyo	21	21

Second round
4	(France) T J Popov	21	21
(Spain) P Abián	10	9
(Slovakia) M Dratva	9	17
(Netherlands) J Kweekel	21	21
6	(Denmark) M Johannesen	21	21
(Norway) M Barth	16	13
(Slovenia) M Ivančič	13	13
(Azerbaijan) A R Dwicahyo	21	21

Third round
4	(France) T J Popov	17	21	21
(Netherlands) J Kweekel	21	16	14
6	(Denmark) M Johannesen	19	21	19
(Azerbaijan) A R Dwicahyo	21	12	21

Quarter-finals
4	(France) T J Popov	21	21
(Azerbaijan) A R Dwicahyo	10	13

=== Bottom half ===
==== Section 3 ====
First round
(Switzerland) J König	7	10
(Finland) J Oldorff	21	21
(Germany) F Roth	21	21
(Austria) L Wraber	10	16

Second round
(Finland) J Oldorff	21	16	21
(Italy) G Toti	14	21	19
(Czech Republic) J Louda
8	(Belgium) J Carraggi	w	/	o
(Germany) F Roth	21	21
(Hungary) G Pytel	11	8
(France) A Lanier	21	21
3	(France) C Popov	17	19

Third round
(Finland) J Oldorff	21	21
8	(Belgium) J Carraggi	9	10
(Germany) F Roth	21	11
(France) A Lanier	23	21

Quarter-finals
(Finland) J Oldorff	21	21
(France) A Lanier	12	19

==== Section 4 ====
First round
(Ukraine) D Bosniuk	26	23
(Malta) M Abela	24	21
(Portugal) B Carvalho	11	13
(Netherlands) M Caljouw	21	21

Second round
(Ukraine) D Bosniuk	19	13
(France) A Merklé	21	21
(Israel) M Zilberman	16	10
7	(Republic of Ireland) N Nguyen	21	21
(Netherlands) M Caljouw	21	21
(Germany) M Kicklitz	12	17
(Spain) L Peñalver	16	22
2	(Denmark) A Antonsen	21	24

Third round
(France) A Merklé	21	21
7	(Republic of Ireland) N Nguyen	15	18
(Netherlands) M Caljouw	18	11
2	(Denmark) A Antonsen	21	21

Quarter-finals
(France) A Merklé	22	25
2	(Denmark) A Antonsen	24	27

== Women's singles ==
=== Seeds ===
1. (Spain) Carolina Marín (champion)
2. (Denmark) Mia Blichfeldt (third round)
3. (Denmark) Line Kjærsfeldt (quarter-finals)
4. (Scotland) Kirsty Gilmour (final)
5. (Germany) Yvonne Li (withdrew)
6. (Denmark) Line Christophersen (quarter-finals)
7. (Turkey) Neslihan Arın (semi-finals)
8. (Denmark) Julie Dawall Jakobsen (semi-finals)

=== Finals ===
Semi-finals
1	(Spain) Carolina Marín	21	21
8	(Denmark) Julie Dawall Jakobsen	16	7
4	(Scotland) Kirsty Gilmour	21	21
7	(Turkey) Neslihan Arın	18	13

Final
1	(Spain) Carolina Marín	21	21
4	(Scotland) Kirsty Gilmour	11	18

=== Top half ===
==== Section 1 ====
First round
(Bulgaria) K Nalbantova	21	21
(Switzerland) M Schnider	13	12
(Israel) H Neiman	17	15
(France) L Huet	21	21

Second round
1	(Spain) C Marín	21	21
(Scotland) R Sugden	6	7
(Hungary) V Sándorházi	17	21	13
(Bulgaria) K Nalbantova	21	19	21
5	(Germany) Y Li	n	/	m
(Netherlands) J Laurens	n	/	m
(Poland) W Dabczynska	14	16
(France) L Huet	21	21

Third round
1	(Spain) C Marín	21	21
(Bulgaria) K Nalbantova	14	12
(France) L Huet	w	/	o

Quarter-finals
1	(Spain) C Marín	21	21
(France) L Huet	18	15

==== Section 2 ====
First round
(England) L Curtin	7	17
(Turkey) Ö Bayrak	21	21
(Ukraine) P Buhrova	21	21
(Slovenia) P Polanc	17	16

Second round
3	(Denmark) L Kjærsfeldt	21	21
(Luxembourg) K Schmidt	13	10
(Lithuania) S Golubickaite	10	14
(Turkey) Ö Bayrak	21	21
8	(Denmark) J D Jakobsen	17	21	21
(Belgium) L Tan	21	17	16
(Czech Republic) T Švábíková	28	21
(Ukraine) P Buhrova	26	19

Third round
3	(Denmark) L Kjærsfeldt	21	21
(Turkey) Ö Bayrak	13	15
8	(Denmark) J D Jakobsen	21	21
(Czech Republic) T Švábíková	16	8

Quarter-finals
3	(Denmark) L Kjærsfeldt	21	12	18
8	(Denmark) J D Jakobsen	10	21	21

=== Bottom half ===
==== Section 3 ====
First round
(Italy) G Stiglich	21	15	13
(Hungary) Á Körösi	17	21	21
(Azerbaijan) K F Azzahra	15	20
(Estonia) K Kuuba	21	22

Second round
(Hungary) Á Körösi	21	21
(Bulgaria) H Popovska	15	18
(Czech Republic) K Tomalová	6	11
6	(Denmark) L Christophersen	21	21
(Estonia) K Kuuba	12	14
(France) Qi XF	21	21
(Spain) C Azurmendi	14	14
4	(Scotland) K Gilmour	21	21

Third round
(Hungary) Á Körösi	17	15
6	(Denmark) L Christophersen	21	21
(France) Qi XF	19	16
4	(Scotland) K Gilmour	21	21

Quarter-finals
6	(Denmark) L Christophersen	15	17
4	(Scotland) K Gilmour	21	21

==== Section 4 ====
First round
(Republic of Ireland) R Darragh	21	21	21
(Israel) K Polikarpova	23	15	17
(France) R O Pancasari	21	21
(Belgium) C Lassaux	14	16

Second round
(Republic of Ireland) R Darragh	22	21
(Germany) M Wilson	24	23
(Sweden) C Wang	7	9
7	(Turkey) N Arın	21	21
(France) R O Pancasari	10	21	21
(Switzerland) J Stadelmann	21	18	9
(England) F Redfearn	16	8
2	(Denmark) M Blichfeldt	21	21

Third round
(Germany) M Wilson	14	18
7	(Turkey) N Arın	21	21
(France) R O Pancasari	19	21	21
2	(Denmark) M Blichfeldt	21	15	12

Quarter-finals
7	(Turkey) N Arın	21	21
(France) R O Pancasari	15	10

== Men's doubles ==
=== Seeds ===
1. (Denmark) Kim Astrup / Anders Skaarup Rasmussen (champions)
2. (Denmark) Rasmus Kjær / Frederik Søgaard (semi-finals)
3. (England) Ben Lane / Sean Vendy (semi-finals)
4. (Germany) Mark Lamsfuß / Marvin Seidel (withdrew)
5. (Scotland) Alexander Dunn / Adam Hall (quarter-finals)
6. (France) Lucas Corvée / Ronan Labar (first round)
7. (Denmark) Daniel Lundgaard / Mads Vestergaard (second round)
8. (France) Christo Popov / Toma Junior Popov (second round)

=== Finals ===
Semi-finals
1	(Denmark) Kim Astrup (Denmark) Anders Skaarup Rasmussen	21	21
3	(England) Ben Lane (England) Sean Vendy	19	7
(Denmark) Andreas Søndergaard (Denmark) Jesper Toft	21	21
2	(Denmark) Rasmus Kjær (Denmark) Frederik Søgaard	15	16

Final
1	(Denmark) Kim Astrup (Denmark) Anders Skaarup Rasmussen	21	21
(Denmark) Andreas Søndergaard (Denmark) Jesper Toft	16	15

=== Top half ===
==== Section 1 ====
First round
(Bulgaria) I Rusev (Bulgaria) I Stoynov	21	21
(Iceland) D B Björnsson (Iceland) K D Finnsson	13	16
5	(Scotland) A Dunn (Scotland) A Hall	21	21
(Norway) T Flaatten (Norway) V Rikheim	9	13
(Czech Republic) V Kulíšek (Czech Republic) T Švejda	17	21	17
(Poland) J Melaniuk (Poland) W Trecki	21	14	21

Second round
1	(Denmark) K Astrup (Denmark) A S Rasmussen	21	21
(Bulgaria) I Rusev (Bulgaria) I Stoynov	16	13
5	(Scotland) A Dunn (Scotland) A Hall	21	21
(Poland) J Melaniuk (Poland) W Trecki	14	14

Quarter-finals
1	(Denmark) K Astrup (Denmark) A S Rasmussen	21	21
5	(Scotland) A Dunn (Scotland) A Hall	11	13

==== Section 2 ====
First round
(Estonia) K Kaljurand (Estonia) R Käsner	21	16
(Republic of Ireland) J Magee (Republic of Ireland) P Reynolds	23	21
6	(France) L Corvée (France) R Labar	18	21	16
(Germany) B Geiss (Germany) J C Völker	21	15	21
(Netherlands) T van der Lecq (Netherlands) B Wassink	17	15
(France) É Adam (France) L Rossi	21	21

Second round
3	(England) B Lane (England) S Vendy	21	21
(Republic of Ireland) J Magee (Republic of Ireland) P Reynolds	15	14
(Germany) B Geiss (Germany) J C Völker	16	12
(France) É Adam (France) L Rossi	21	21

Quarter-finals
3	(England) B Lane (England) S Vendy	21	21
(France) É Adam (France) L Rossi	19	18

=== Bottom half ===
==== Section 3 ====
First round
(Estonia) A Berik (Estonia) I Stoynov	8	16
(Denmark) A Søndergaard (Denmark) J Toft	21	21
(Germany) D Hess (Germany) P Scheiel	13	17
8	(France) C Popov (France) T J Popov	21	21
(Scotland) C Grimley (Scotland) M Grimley	21	21
(Czech Republic) O Král (Czech Republic) A Mendrek	11	16

Second round
(Denmark) A Søndergaard (Denmark) J Toft	21	21
8	(France) C Popov (France) T J Popov	8	13
(Scotland) C Grimley (Scotland) M Grimley	w	/	o
4	(Germany) M Lamsfuß (Germany) M Seidel

Quarter-finals
(Denmark) A Søndergaard (Denmark) J Toft	21	21
(Scotland) C Grimley (Scotland) M Grimley	14	16

==== Section 4 ====
First round
(England) C Hemming (England) Et van Leeuwen	19	21	21
(Poland) R Cybulski (Poland) S Slepecki	21	13	16
(Germany) J R Jansen (Germany) K Neumann	21	12	14
7	(Denmark) D Lundgaard (Denmark) M Vestergaard	18	21	21
(Sweden) F Karlborg (Sweden) M Molin	21	19	15
(Spain) R García (Spain) C Piris	19	21	21

Second round
(England) C Hemming (England) Et van Leeuwen	22	21
7	(Denmark) D Lundgaard (Denmark) M Vestergaard	20	16
(Spain) R García (Spain) C Piris	7	10
2	(Denmark) R Kjær (Denmark) F Søgaard	21	21

Quarter-finals
(England) C Hemming (England) Et van Leeuwen	20	9
2	(Denmark) R Kjær (Denmark) F Søgaard	22	21

== Women's doubles ==
=== Seeds ===
1. (Denmark) Maiken Fruergaard / Sara Thygesen (quarter-finals)
2. (France) Margot Lambert / Anne Tran (champions)
3. (Bulgaria) Gabriela Stoeva / Stefani Stoeva (final)
4. (Netherlands) Debora Jille / Cheryl Seinen (semi-finals)
5. (Germany) Linda Efler / Isabel Lohau (quarter-finals)
6. (Scotland) Julie Macpherson / Ciara Torrance (quarter-finals)
7. (Sweden) Moa Sjöö / Tilda Sjöö (quarter-finals)
8. (Turkey) Bengisu Erçetin / Nazlıcan İnci (semi-finals)

=== Finals ===
Semi-finals
8	(Turkey) Bengisu Erçetin (Turkey) Nazlıcan İnci	11	15
3	(Bulgaria) Gabriela Stoeva (Bulgaria) Stefani Stoeva	21	21
4	(Netherlands) Debora Jille (Netherlands) Cheryl Seinen	15	12
2	(France) Margot Lambert (France) Anne Tran	21	21

Final
3	(Bulgaria) Gabriela Stoeva (Bulgaria) Stefani Stoeva	21	17	11
2	(France) Margot Lambert (France) Anne Tran	16	21	21

=== Top half ===
==== Section 1 ====
First round

Second round

Quarter-finals

1
(Denmark) M Fruergaard
(Denmark) S Thygesen
21
21

(Latvia) A Kupča
(Latvia) J Romanova
6
10

- (Norway) M Christensen
  (Norway) A Hong
10
19

(Latvia) A Kupča
(Latvia) J Romanova
21
21

1
(Denmark) M Fruergaard
(Denmark) S Thygesen
21
19
13

8
(Turkey) B Erçetin
(Turkey) N İnci
16
21
21

8
(Turkey) B Erçetin
(Turkey) N İnci
21
21

(England) A Harris
(England) A Lado
14
17

8
(Turkey) B Erçetin
(Turkey) N İnci
21
21

(France) S Bauer
(France) E Vercelot
13
16

(Azerbaijan) K F Azzahra
(Azerbaijan) E Maftuha
6
20

(France) S Bauer
(France) E Vercelot
21
22

==== Section 2 ====
First round
(Poland) P Hankiewicz (Poland) K Marczak	15	16
(Spain) P López (Spain) L Rodríguez	21	21
5	(Germany) L Efler (Germany) I Lohau	21	21
(Netherlands) D Odijk (Netherlands) I van Leijsen	8	6
(Austria) S Au Yeong (Austria) K Hochmeir	21	21
(Czech Republic) V Brožkovcová (Czech Republic) V Dobiášová	15	11

Second round
3	(Bulgaria) G Stoeva (Bulgaria) S Stoeva	21	21
(Spain) P López (Spain) L Rodríguez	15	8
5	(Germany) L Efler (Germany) I Lohau	21	21
(Austria) S Au Yeong (Austria) K Hochmeir	12	10

Quarter-finals
3	(Bulgaria) G Stoeva (Bulgaria) S Stoeva	21	21
5	(Germany) L Efler (Germany) I Lohau	15	14

=== Bottom half ===
==== Section 3 ====
First round
(France) T Margueritte (France) F Vallet	21	21
(Poland) A Khomich (Poland) D Zimnol	13	18
(Czech Republic) S Hořínková (Czech Republic) K Zuzáková	8	12
7	(Sweden) M Sjöö (Sweden) T Sjöö	21	21
(Germany) J Meyer (Germany) L Michalski	21	21
(Slovenia) K Matovic (Slovenia) Z Novak	12	7

Second round
(France) T Margueritte (France) F Vallet	21	15	17
7	(Sweden) M Sjöö (Sweden) T Sjöö	19	21	21
(Germany) J Meyer (Germany) L Michalski	13	8
4	(Netherlands) D Jille (Netherlands) C Seinen	21	21

Quarter-finals
7	(Sweden) M Sjöö (Sweden) T Sjöö	10	15
4	(Netherlands) D Jille (Netherlands) C Seinen	21	21

==== Section 4 ====
First round
(Republic of Ireland) K Frost (Republic of Ireland) S Noble	19	21	17
(Bulgaria) M Chepisheva (Bulgaria) T Popivanova	21	18	21
(Estonia) C Kruus (Estonia) R Üprus	17	14
6	(Scotland) J MacPherson (Scotland) C Torrance	21	21
(Ukraine) M Stoliarenko (Ukraine) Y Zharka	15	16
(England) C Birch (England) Es van Leeuwen	21	21

Second round
(Bulgaria) M Chepisheva (Bulgaria) T Popivanova	13	12
6	(Scotland) J MacPherson (Scotland) C Torrance	21	21
(England) C Birch (England) Es van Leeuwen	10	20
2	(France) M Lambert (France) A Tran	21	22

Quarter-finals
6	(Scotland) J MacPherson (Scotland) C Torrance	10	10
2	(France) M Lambert (France) A Tran	21	21

== Mixed doubles ==
=== Seeds ===
1. (Denmark) Mathias Christiansen / Alexandra Bøje (final)
2. (France) Thom Gicquel / Delphine Delrue (champions)
3. (Netherlands) Robin Tabeling / Selena Piek (semi-finals)
4. (Denmark) Mathias Thyrri / Amalie Magelund (semi-finals)
5. (England) Marcus Ellis / Lauren Smith (quarter-finals)
6. (Germany) Mark Lamsfuß / Isabel Lohau (withdrew)
7. (Denmark) Mads Vestergaard / Christine Busch (first round)
8. (England) Gregory Mairs / Jenny Mairs (first round)

=== Finals ===
Semi-finals
1	(Denmark) Mathias Christiansen (Denmark) Alexandra Bøje	25	21	21
3	(Netherlands) Robin Tabeling (Netherlands) Selena Piek	23	23	18
4	(Denmark) Mathias Thyrri (Denmark) Amalie Magelund	20	21	13
2	(France) Thom Gicquel (France) Delphine Delrue	22	16	21

Final
1	(Denmark) Mathias Christiansen (Denmark) Alexandra Bøje	16	15
2	(France) Thom Gicquel (France) Delphine Delrue	21	21

=== Top half ===
==== Section 1 ====
First round
(Sweden) L Axelsson (Sweden) J Silvennoinen	21	21
(Switzerland) M Q Pham (Switzerland) A Müller	15	17
5	(England) M Ellis (England) L Smith	21	21
(Poland) R Cybulski (Poland) K Marczak	10	14
(France) T Lalot Trescarte (France) E Jacob	18	21	21
(Slovenia) M Ivančič (Slovenia) P Polanc	21	12	15

Second round
1	(Denmark) M Christiansen (Denmark) A Bøje	21	21
(Sweden) L Axelsson (Sweden) J Silvennoinen	9	14
5	(England) M Ellis (England) L Smith	21	21
(France) T Lalot Trescarte (France) E Jacob	16	9

Quarter-finals
1	(Denmark) M Christiansen (Denmark) A Bøje	21	21
5	(England) M Ellis (England) L Smith	15	18

==== Section 2 ====
First round
(Bulgaria) I Stoynov (Bulgaria) H Popovska	21	19	18
(Scotland) A Pringle (Scotland) R Andrew	14	21	21
6	(Germany) M Lamsfuß (Germany) I Lohau
(Republic of Ireland) J Magee (Republic of Ireland) M Ryan	w	/	o
(Spain) R García (Spain) L Rodríguez	21	21
(Israel) M Zilberman (Israel) S Zilberman	15	10

Second round
3	(Netherlands) R Tabeling (Netherlands) S Piek	21	21
(Scotland) A Pringle (Scotland) R Andrew	16	8
(Republic of Ireland) J Magee (Republic of Ireland) M Ryan	15	12
(Spain) R García (Spain) L Rodríguez	21	21

Quarter-finals
3	(Netherlands) R Tabeling (Netherlands) S Piek	21	21
(Spain) R García (Spain) L Rodríguez	10	11

=== Bottom half ===
==== Section 3 ====
First round
(Denmark) J Toft (Denmark) C Graversen	21	21
(Germany) P Scheiel (Germany) F Volkmann	19	9
(England) C Hemming (England) Es van Leeuwen	19	21	23
7	(Denmark) M Vestergaard (Denmark) C Busch	21	18	21
(Germany) M Bourakkadi (Germany) L Michalski	10	12
(Netherlands) T van der Lecq (Netherlands) A Tirtosentono	21	21

Second round
(Denmark) J Toft (Denmark) C Graversen	18	21	21
(England) C Hemming (England) Es van Leeuwen	21	13	17
(Netherlands) T van der Lecq (Netherlands) A Tirtosentono	16	14
4	(Denmark) M Thyrri (Denmark) A Magelund	21	21

Quarter-finals
(Denmark) J Toft (Denmark) C Graversen	19	17
4	(Denmark) M Thyrri (Denmark) A Magelund	21	21

==== Section 4 ====
First round
(Sweden) J Ekman (Sweden) N Wang	16	22
(Germany) J R Jansen (Germany) T P Nguyen	21	24
(Scotland) A Hall (Scotland) J MacPherson	22	13	21
8	(England) G Mairs (England) J Mairs	20	21	16
(Serbia) M Tomic (Serbia) A Vitman	21	21
(Spain) J Fernández (Spain) P López	16	8

Second round
(Germany) J R Jansen (Germany) T P Nguyen	21	21
(Scotland) A Hall (Scotland) J MacPherson	16	17
(Serbia) M Tomic (Serbia) A Vitman	17	11
2	(France) T Gicquel (France) D Delrue	21	21

Quarter-finals
(Germany) J R Jansen (Germany) T P Nguyen	15	17
2	(France) T Gicquel (France) D Delrue	21	21
