= 2024 Hylo Open =

2024 badminton tournament in Saarbrücken

Tournament details
- Dates: 29 October–3 November
- Level: Super 300
- Total prize money: US$210,000
- Venue: Saarlandhalle
- Location: Saarbrücken, Germany

Champions
- Men's singles: (France) Christo Popov
- Women's singles: (Denmark) Mia Blichfeldt
- Men's doubles: (England) Ben Lane (England) Sean Vendy
- Women's doubles: (Chinese Taipei) Sung Shuo-yun (Chinese Taipei) Yu Chien-hui
- Mixed doubles: (Denmark) Jesper Toft (Denmark) Amalie Magelund
- Official website: hylo-open.de/en/

The 2024 Hylo Open was a badminton tournament which took place at the Saarlandhalle in Saarbrücken, Germany, from 29 October to 3 November 2024 and had a total prize of US$210,000.

== Tournament ==
The 2024 Hylo Open was the thirty-second tournament of the 2024 BWF World Tour. It is a part of the Hylo Open, which had been held since 1988. This tournament was organized by the 1. BC Bischmisheim with sanction from the BWF.

=== Venue ===
This international tournament was held at the Saarlandhalle in Saarbrücken, Germany.

=== Point distribution ===
Below is the point distribution table for each phase of the tournament based on the BWF points system for the BWF World Tour Super 300 event.

Winner	Runner-up	3/4	5/8	9/16	17/32
7,000	5,950	4,900	3,850	2,750	1,670

=== Prize money ===
The total prize money for this tournament was US$210,000. The distribution of the prize money was in accordance with BWF regulations.

Event	Winner	Finalist	Semi-finals	Quarter-finals	Last 16
Singles	$15,750	$7,980	$3,045	$1,260	$735
Doubles	$16,590	$7,980	$2,940	$1,522.5	$787.5

== Men's singles ==
=== Seeds ===
1. (Chinese Taipei) Chou Tien-chen (quarter-finals)
2. (France) Alex Lanier (withdrew)
3. (France) Toma Junior Popov (final)
4. (France) Christo Popov (champion)
5. (Denmark) Rasmus Gemke (semi-finals)
6. (Republic of Ireland) Nhat Nguyen (quarter-finals)
7. (India) Sathish Kumar Karunakaran (quarter-finals)
8. (Belgium) Julien Carraggi (first round)

=== Finals ===
Semi-finals
5	(Denmark) Rasmus Gemke	8^{r}
3	(France) Toma Junior Popov	17
SWM	(India) Ayush Shetty	17	13
4	(France) Christo Popov	21	21

Final
3	(France) Toma Junior Popov	13	10
4	(France) Christo Popov	21	21

=== Top half ===
==== Section 1 ====
First round
1	(Chinese Taipei) Chou T-c	21	21
Q4	(Germany) A Sonnenschein	14	14
PFQ	(France) L Claerbout	17	21	15
(Azerbaijan) A R Dwicahyo	21	17	21
5	(Denmark) R Gemke	21	21
(Switzerland) T Künzi	10	10
(Israel) M Zilberman	21	21
Q1	(Germany) Oei K-Y	13	14

Second round
1	(Chinese Taipei) Chou T-c	21	21
(Azerbaijan) A R Dwicahyo	7	11
5	(Denmark) R Gemke	21	21
(Israel) M Zilberman	15	13

Quarter-finals
1	(Chinese Taipei) Chou T-c	13	20
5	(Denmark) R Gemke	21	22

==== Section 2 ====
First round
3	(France) T J Popov	21	21
(Spain) P Abián	9	19
(Denmark) M Christophersen	11
(Germany) F Roth	6^{r}
6	(Republic of Ireland) N Nguyen	21	21
(France) E Roy	17	10
(India) T Mannepalli	19	19
Q2	(Austria) C V Filimon	21	21

Second round
3	(France) T J Popov	18	21	21
(Denmark) M Christophersen	21	10	7
6	(Republic of Ireland) N Nguyen	15	21	21
Q2	(Austria) C V Filimon	21	8	15

Quarter-finals
3	(France) T J Popov	17	21	21
6	(Republic of Ireland) N Nguyen	21	15	15

=== Bottom half ===
==== Section 3 ====
First round
(El Salvador) U Canjura	21	15	18
(Italy) G Toti	9	21	21
(Finland) J Oldorff	12	17
SWM	(India) A Shetty	21	21
(Finland) K Koljonen	21	21
(Denmark) V Ø Kauffmann	19	14
(Kazakhstan) D Panarin	23	21
8	(Belgium) J Carraggi	21	16

Second round
(Italy) G Toti	13	9
SWM	(India) A Shetty	21	21
(Finland) K Koljonen	21	21
(Kazakhstan) D Panarin	2	18

Quarter-finals
SWM	(India) A Shetty	21	21
(Finland) K Koljonen	18	18

==== Section 4 ====
First round
PFQ	(England) H Huang	21	11	21
(India) S Subramanian	19	21	11
(India) C Sen	22	22	17
7	(India) S K Karunakaran	20	24	21
(Czech Republic) J Louda	16	20
(Israel) D Dubovenko	21	22
Q3	(Malaysia) Tan J J	14	14
4	(France) C Popov	21	21

Second round
PFQ	(England) H Huang	12	15
7	(India) S K Karunakaran	21	21
(Israel) D Dubovenko	13	9
4	(France) C Popov	21	21

Quarter-finals
7	(India) S K Karunakaran
4	(France) C Popov	w	/	o

== Women's singles ==
=== Seeds ===
1. (Denmark) Line Kjærsfeldt (quarter-finals)
2. (Scotland) Kirsty Gilmour (second round)
3. (Chinese Taipei) Sung Shuo-yun (quarter-finals)
4. (Vietnam) Nguyễn Thùy Linh (quarter-finals)
5. (Denmark) Line Christophersen (semi-finals)
6. (India) Malvika Bansod (final)
7. (Denmark) Mia Blichfeldt (champion)
8. (Denmark) Julie Dawall Jakobsen (semi-finals)

=== Finals ===
Semi-finals
5	(Denmark) Line Christophersen	19	12
7	(Denmark) Mia Blichfeldt	21	21
6	(India) Malvika Bansod	23	21
8	(Denmark) Julie Dawall Jakobsen	21	18

Final
7	(Denmark) Mia Blichfeldt	21	21
6	(India) Malvika Bansod	10	15

=== Top half ===
==== Section 1 ====
First round
1	(Denmark) L Kjærsfeldt	21	21
Q1	(Belgium) C Lassaux	14	8
Q3	(Denmark) A S Ryberg	21	21
Q4	(India) K Mopati	8	12
5	(Denmark) L Christophersen	21	21
(Estonia) K Kuuba	11	14
(Spain) C Azurmendi	11	21	21
(Bulgaria) K Nalbantova	21	17	12

Second round
1	(Denmark) L Kjærsfeldt	21	21
Q3	(Denmark) A S Ryberg	12	12
5	(Denmark) L Christophersen	21	21
(Spain) C Azurmendi	15	8

Quarter-finals
1	(Denmark) L Kjærsfeldt	21	14	16
5	(Denmark) L Christophersen	11	21	21

==== Section 2 ====
First round
3	(Chinese Taipei) Sung S-y	18	21	21
Q2	(Ukraine) Y Kantemyr	21	8	10
(France) A Tatranova	21	11
(Czech Republic) T Švábíková	16	4^{r}
7	(Denmark) M Blichfeldt	21	21
(France) R Cloteaux-Foucault	12	10
(Poland) W Dąbczyńska	16	21	12
(France) L Huet	21	13	21

Second round
3	(Chinese Taipei) Sung S-y	21	21
(France) A Tatranova	15	15
7	(Denmark) M Blichfeldt	21	21
(France) L Huet	19	10

Quarter-finals
3	(Chinese Taipei) Sung S-y	14	14
7	(Denmark) M Blichfeldt	21	21

=== Bottom half ===
==== Section 3 ====
First round
(United States) D Gupta	15	12
(Denmark) I A Andersen	21	21
(Bulgaria) H Popovska	6	17
6	(India) M Bansod	21	21
(Denmark) A Schulz	24	18	18
(Azerbaijan) K F Azzahra	22	21	21
(Republic of Ireland) R Darragh	8	18
4	(Vietnam) Nguyễn T L	21	21

Second round
(Denmark) I A Andersen	13	16
6	(India) M Bansod	21	21
(Azerbaijan) K F Azzahra	13	15
4	(Vietnam) Nguyễn T L	21	21

Quarter-finals
6	(India) M Bansod	21	21
4	(Vietnam) Nguyễn T L	15	17

==== Section 4 ====
First round
(France) Qi XF	19	15
(Ukraine) P Buhrova	21	21
(Hungary) Á Kőrösi	20	14
8	(Denmark) J D Jakobsen	22	21
(India) R Ramraj	21	21
(Chinese Taipei) Yu C-h	13	19
(Malaysia) Kisona S	21	8	12
2	(Scotland) K Gilmour	15	21	21

Second round
(Ukraine) P Buhrova	11	15
8	(Denmark) J D Jakobsen	21	21
(India) R Ramraj	21	21
2	(Scotland) K Gilmour	14	12

Quarter-finals
8	(Denmark) J D Jakobsen	21	21
(India) R Ramraj	12	17

== Men's doubles ==
=== Seeds ===
1. (England) Ben Lane / Sean Vendy (champions)
2. (Denmark) Rasmus Kjær / Frederik Søgaard (final)
3. (Denmark) Jesper Toft / Andreas Søndergaard (second round)
4. (Chinese Taipei) Lin Bing-wei / Su Ching-heng (quarter-finals)
5. (Denmark) Mads Vestergaard / Daniel Lundgaard (semi-finals)
6. (France) Christo Popov / Toma Junior Popov (semi-finals)
7. (Scotland) Christopher Grimley / Matthew Grimley (quarter-finals)
8. (France) Julien Maio / William Villeger (first round)

=== Finals ===
Semi-finals
1	(England) Ben Lane (England) Sean Vendy	23	22
5	(Denmark) Daniel Lundgaard (Denmark) Mads Vestergaard	21	20
6	(France) Christo Popov (France) Toma Junior Popov	14	9
2	(Denmark) Rasmus Kjær (Denmark) Frederik Søgaard	21	21

Final
1	(England) Ben Lane (England) Sean Vendy	18	21	21
2	(Denmark) Rasmus Kjær (Denmark) Frederik Søgaard	21	15	18

=== Top half ===
==== Section 1 ====
First round
1	(England) B Lane (England) S Vendy	21	21
(Bulgaria) I Rusev (Bulgaria) I Stoynov	15	7
(France) M Cattoen (France) L Renoir	21	21
(Czech Republic) V Kulíšek (Czech Republic) T Švejda	16	17
8	(France) J Maio (France) W Villeger	21	23	13
(Scotland) A Dunn (Scotland) A Pringle	15	25	21
(Poland) J Melaniuk (Poland) W Trecki	17	22
(Netherlands) T van der Lecq (Netherlands) B Wassink	21	24

Second round
1	(England) B Lane (England) S Vendy	21	21
(France) M Cattoen (France) L Renoir	17	11
(Scotland) A Dunn (Scotland) A Pringle	21	23
(Netherlands) T van der Lecq (Netherlands) B Wassink	19	21

Quarter-finals
1	(England) B Lane (England) S Vendy	21	21
(Scotland) A Dunn (Scotland) A Pringle	13	17

==== Section 2 ====
First round
3	(Denmark) J Toft (Denmark) A Søndergaard	26	21
(Czech Republic) J Král (Czech Republic) O Král	24	8
(Germany) D Hess (Germany) M Seidel	21	21
(Germany) M Datko (Germany) P Volkmann	13	12
5	(Denmark) D Lundgaard (Denmark) M Vestergaard	22	21
Q4	(Netherlands) A Buijk (Netherlands) T Stoffelen	20	8
Q3	(Germany) J Dresp (Germany) A Sonnenschein	17	14
(England) C Hemming (England) Et van Leeuwen	21	21

Second round
3	(Denmark) J Toft (Denmark) A Søndergaard	19	15
(Germany) D Hess (Germany) M Seidel	21	21
5	(Denmark) D Lundgaard (Denmark) M Vestergaard	21	21
(England) C Hemming (England) Et van Leeuwen	11	14

Quarter-finals
(Germany) D Hess (Germany) M Seidel	19	17
5	(Denmark) D Lundgaard (Denmark) M Vestergaard	21	21

=== Bottom half ===
==== Section 3 ====
First round
Q2	(Finland) I Heino (Finland) R Jäntti	12	15
(Germany) D Eckerlin (Germany) S Krax	21	21
(Switzerland) Y Orteu (Switzerland) M Q Pham	5	17
6	(France) C Popov (France) T J Popov	21	21
(France) L Ducrot (France) Q Ronget	21	21
(Germany) M Bourakkadi (Germany) K Neumann	18	19
Q1	(Denmark) K Kolding (Denmark) T Rønbøg	15	9
4	(Chinese Taipei) Lin B-w (Chinese Taipei) Su C-h	21	21

Second round
(Germany) D Eckerlin (Germany) S Krax	16	13
6	(France) C Popov (France) T J Popov	21	21
(France) L Ducrot (France) Q Ronget	19	14
4	(Chinese Taipei) Lin B-w (Chinese Taipei) Su C-h	21	21

Quarter-finals
6	(France) C Popov (France) T J Popov	21	21
4	(Chinese Taipei) Lin B-w (Chinese Taipei) Su C-h	18	14

==== Section 4 ====
First round
(Spain) R Garcia (Spain) C Piris	12	11
(Germany) B Geiss (Germany) J R Jansen	21	21
(Denmark) R Espersen (Denmark) C F Kjær	13	17
7	(Scotland) C Grimley (Scotland) M Grimley	21	21
(France) E Adam (France) L Rossi	15	17
(Malaysia) Chia W J (Malaysia) Lwi S H	21	21
(France) N Begga (France) B Labarthe	10	13
2	(Denmark) R Kjær (Denmark) F Søgaard	21	21

Second round
(Germany) B Geiss (Germany) J R Jansen	12	16
7	(Scotland) C Grimley (Scotland) M Grimley	21	21
(Malaysia) Chia W J (Malaysia) Lwi S H	10	19
2	(Denmark) R Kjær (Denmark) F Søgaard	21	21

Quarter-finals
7	(Scotland) C Grimley (Scotland) M Grimley	17	19
2	(Denmark) R Kjær (Denmark) F Søgaard	21	21

== Women's doubles ==
=== Seeds ===
1. (Chinese Taipei) Sung Shuo-yun / Yu Chien-hui (champions)
2. (Ukraine) Polina Buhrova / Yevheniia Kantemyr (final)
3. (Scotland) Ciara Torrance / Julie Macpherson (quarter-finals)
4. (Denmark) Julie Finne-Ipsen / Mai Surrow (second round)
5. (Netherlands) Debora Jille / (France) Margot Lambert (quarter-finals)
6. (Denmark) Natasja Anthonisen / Maiken Fruergaard (semi-finals)
7. (Germany) Thuc Phuong Nguyen / Linda Efler (semi-finals)
8. (Spain) Lucía Rodríguez / Paula López (quarter-finals)

=== Finals ===
Semi-finals
1	(Chinese Taipei) Sung Shuo-yun (Chinese Taipei) Yu Chien-hui	12	21	21
6	(Denmark) Natasja Anthonisen (Denmark) Maiken Fruergaard	21	11	14
7	(Germany) Linda Efler (Germany) Thuc Phuong Nguyen	15	14
2	(Ukraine) Polina Buhrova (Ukraine) Yevheniia Kantemyr	21	21

Final
1	(Chinese Taipei) Sung Shuo-yun (Chinese Taipei) Yu Chien-hui	21	21
2	(Ukraine) Polina Buhrova (Ukraine) Yevheniia Kantemyr	16	14

=== Top half ===
==== Section 1 ====
First round
(England) C Birch (England) Es van Leeuwen	21	21
(Germany) J Meyer (Germany) L Michalski	10	11
5	(Netherlands) D Jille (France) M Lambert	21	17	21
(Switzerland) L Amiguet (Switzerland) C Racloz	14	21	11
(France) T Margueritte (France) F Vallet	21	21
(Netherlands) M Loos (Netherlands) C Seinen	17	14

Second round
1	(Chinese Taipei) Sung S-y (Chinese Taipei) Yu C-h	19	21	21
(England) C Birch (England) Es van Leeuwen	21	8	19
5	(Netherlands) D Jille (France) M Lambert	21	21
(France) T Margueritte (France) F Vallet	11	15

Quarter-finals
1	(Chinese Taipei) Sung S-y (Chinese Taipei) Yu C-h	21	21
5	(Netherlands) D Jille (France) M Lambert	10	12

==== Section 2 ====
First round
4	(Denmark) J Finne-Ipsen (Denmark) M Surrow	21	21
(Germany) S Hübsch (Germany) A Lehmann	17	10
(Denmark) A C Kudsk (Denmark) S Schulz	21	21
(Azerbaijan) E Maftuha (Azerbaijan) H Nuriyeva	11	8
6	(Denmark) N Anthonisen (Denmark) M Fruergaard	21	21
(India) P Konjengbam (India) S Mishra	18	16
(Austria) L Rumpold (Austria) M Simma	12	11
(Belgium) L Jaques (Belgium) L Lammertyn	21	21

Second round
4	(Denmark) J Finne-Ipsen (Denmark) M Surrow	18	10^{r}
(Denmark) A C Kudsk (Denmark) S Schulz	21	13
6	(Denmark) N Anthonisen (Denmark) M Fruergaard	21	21
(Belgium) L Jaques (Belgium) L Lammertyn	5	18

Quarter-finals
(Denmark) A C Kudsk (Denmark) S Schulz	14	11
6	(Denmark) N Anthonisen (Denmark) M Fruergaard	21	21

=== Bottom half ===
==== Section 3 ====
First round
(Republic of Ireland) O Flynn (Republic of Ireland) M Ryan	17	20
(Austria) S Au Yeong (Austria) A Hagspiel	21	22
(Denmark) S Pilgaard (Denmark) M Werge	19	21
7	(Germany) L Efler (Germany) T P Nguyen	21	23
(Bulgaria) M Chepisheva (Bulgaria) T Popivanova	18	20
(Poland) W Dabczynska (Poland) Z Jankowska	21	22
(Netherlands) D Odijk (Netherlands) I van Leijsen	9	11
3	(Scotland) J MacPherson (Scotland) C Torrance	21	21

Second round
(Austria) S Au Yeong (Austria) A Hagspiel	11	10
7	(Germany) L Efler (Germany) T P Nguyen	21	21
(Poland) W Dabczynska (Poland) Z Jankowska	13	14
3	(Scotland) J MacPherson (Scotland) C Torrance	21	21

Quarter-finals
7	(Germany) L Efler (Germany) T P Nguyen	21	21
3	(Scotland) J MacPherson (Scotland) C Torrance	11	14

==== Section 4 ====
First round
(Poland) A Khomich (Poland) D Zimnol	16	16
(Bulgaria) M Mitsova (Bulgaria) K Nalbantova	21	21
(Netherlands) K de Wit (Ukraine) M Stoliarenko	12	14
8	(Spain) P López (Spain) L Rodríguez	21	21
(Poland) P Hankiewicz (Poland) K Marczak	17	19
(Czech Republic) S Hořínková (Czech Republic) K Zuzáková	21	21

Second round
(Bulgaria) M Mitsova (Bulgaria) K Nalbantova	19	14
8	(Spain) P López (Spain) L Rodríguez	21	21
(Czech Republic) S Hořínková (Czech Republic) K Zuzáková	14	9
2	(Ukraine) P Buhrova (Ukraine) Y Kantemyr	21	21

Quarter-finals
8	(Spain) P López (Spain) L Rodríguez	12	19
2	(Ukraine) P Buhrova (Ukraine) Y Kantemyr	21	21

== Mixed doubles ==
=== Seeds ===
1. (France) Thom Gicquel / Delphine Delrue (semi-finals)
2. (Denmark) Mads Vestergaard / Christine Busch (quarter-finals)
3. (Denmark) Jesper Toft / Amalie Magelund (champions)
4. (India) Sathish Kumar Karunakaran / Aadya Variyath (second round)
5. (England) Gregory Mairs / Jenny Mairs (quarter-finals)
6. (Germany) Jones Ralfy Jansen / Thuc Phuong Nguyen (second round)
7. (Scotland) Alexander Dunn / Julie MacPherson (final)
8. (Denmark) Rasmus Espersen / Amalie Cecilie Kudsk (quarter-finals)

=== Finals ===
Semi-finals
1	(France) Thom Gicquel (France) Delphine Delrue	20	21	19
3	(Denmark) Jesper Toft (Denmark) Amalie Magelund	22	13	21
(France) William Villeger (France) Flavie Vallet	20	21	21
7	(Scotland) Alexander Dunn (Scotland) Julie MacPherson	22	18	23

Final
3	(Denmark) Jesper Toft (Denmark) Amalie Magelund	21	21
7	(Scotland) Alexander Dunn (Scotland) Julie MacPherson	19	16

=== Top half ===
==== Section 1 ====
First round
1	(France) T Gicquel (France) D Delrue	21	21
(Azerbaijan) J Alhasanov (Azerbaijan) H Nuriyeva	0	5
(France) G Deschamp (France) M Lambert	23	21	21
(Denmark) K Kolding (Denmark) M Werge	25	18	23
8	(Denmark) R Espersen (Denmark) A C Kudsk	21	18	27
(Slovenia) M Ivancic (Slovenia) P Polanc	14	21	25
(Netherlands) D van Wijlick (Netherlands) C Seinen	21	17	21
(Germany) D Eckerlin (Netherlands) K de Wit	18	21	19

Second round
1	(France) T Gicquel (France) D Delrue	21	21
(Denmark) K Kolding (Denmark) M Werge	13	16
8	(Denmark) R Espersen (Denmark) A C Kudsk	21	21
(Netherlands) D van Wijlick (Netherlands) C Seinen	12	15

Quarter-finals
1	(France) T Gicquel (France) D Delrue	21	21
8	(Denmark) R Espersen (Denmark) A C Kudsk	16	12

==== Section 2 ====
First round
3	(Denmark) J Toft (Denmark) A Magelund	21	21
(France) J Maio (France) L Palermo	12	13
(Spain) R Garcia (Spain) L Rodríguez	21	21
(Germany) K Neumann (Germany) L Efler	19	15
5	(England) G Mairs (England) J Mairs	21	21
Q2	(Germany) M Datko (Germany) J Meyer	15	11
(England) C Hemming (England) Es van Leeuwen	21	21
(Germany) P Volkmann (Germany) F Volkmann	14	10

Second round
3	(Denmark) J Toft (Denmark) A Magelund	21	21
(Spain) R Garcia (Spain) L Rodríguez	10	13
5	(England) G Mairs (England) J Mairs	21	18	21
(England) C Hemming (England) Es van Leeuwen	17	21	18

Quarter-finals
3	(Denmark) J Toft (Denmark) A Magelund	21	21
5	(England) G Mairs (England) J Mairs	13	12

=== Bottom half ===
==== Section 3 ====
First round
(France) W Villeger (France) F Vallet	21	21
(Germany) M Bourakkadi (Germany) L Michalski	18	12
(Ukraine) O Titov (Ukraine) Y Kantemyr	9	13
6	(Germany) J R Jansen (Germany) T P Nguyen	21	21
Q4	(Poland) S Slepecki (Poland) A Khomich	17	14
(France) T L Trescarte (France) E Jacob	21	21
(Scotland) A Pringle (Scotland) R Andrew	21	11	13
4	(India) S K Karunakaran (India) A Variyath	14	21	21

Second round
(France) W Villeger (France) F Vallet	12	21	21
6	(Germany) J R Jansen (Germany) T P Nguyen	21	19	14
(France) T L Trescarte (France) E Jacob	21	21
4	(India) S K Karunakaran (India) A Variyath	19	13

Quarter-finals
(France) W Villeger (France) F Vallet	22	21
(France) T L Trescarte (France) E Jacob	20	19

==== Section 4 ====
First round
Q1	(Denmark) C F Kjær (Denmark) M Fruergaard	21	15	21
(England) Et van Leeuwen (England) C Birch	18	21	19
(Netherlands) T van der Lecq (Netherlands) D Jille	15	26	14
7	(Scotland) A Dunn (Scotland) J MacPherson	21	24	21
(Macau) Leong I C (Macau) Ng W C	21	21
Q3	(Czech Republic) T Švejda (Czech Republic) S Hořínková	11	17
(Republic of Ireland) J Magee (Republic of Ireland) M Ryan	13	16
2	(Denmark) M Vestergaard (Denmark) C Busch	21	21

Second round
Q1	(Denmark) C F Kjær (Denmark) M Fruergaard	18	18
7	(Scotland) A Dunn (Scotland) J MacPherson	21	21
(Macau) Leong I C (Macau) Ng W C	15	12
2	(Denmark) M Vestergaard (Denmark) C Busch	21	21

Quarter-finals
7	(Scotland) A Dunn (Scotland) J MacPherson	21	21
2	(Denmark) M Vestergaard (Denmark) C Busch	19	12

Preceded by 2024 Denmark Open; 2024 Malaysia Super 100	BWF World Tour; 2024 BWF season	Succeeded by 2024 Korea Masters
