= 2024 Canada Open =

Tournament details
- Dates: 2 July – 7 July
- Edition: 59th
- Level: Super 500
- Total prize money: US$420,000
- Venue: Markin-MacPhail Centre
- Location: Calgary, Alberta, Canada

Champions
- Men's singles: (Japan) Koki Watanabe
- Women's singles: (Thailand) Busanan Ongbamrungphan
- Men's doubles: (Denmark) Kim Astrup (Denmark) Anders Skaarup Rasmussen
- Women's doubles: (Japan) Rin Iwanaga (Japan) Kie Nakanishi
- Mixed doubles: (Denmark) Jesper Toft (Denmark) Amalie Magelund

The 2024 Canada Open (officially known as the Yonex Canada Open 2024 for sponsorship reasons) was a badminton tournament which took place at Markin-MacPhail Centre in Calgary, Canada, from 2 July to 7 July 2024 and has a total purse of $420,000.

== Tournament ==
The 2024 Canada Open was the nineteenth tournament of the 2024 BWF World Tour and also part of the Canada Open championships, which has been held since 1957. This tournament was organized by the Badminton Canada and sanctioned by the BWF. Started from 2023, the Canada Open has moved from the entry level of BWF World Tour Super 100 up two levels to Super 500.

=== Venue ===
This international tournament was held at the Markin-MacPhail Centre, WinSport in Calgary, Alberta, Canada.

=== Point distribution ===
Below is the point distribution table for each phase of the tournament based on the BWF points system for the BWF World Tour Super 500 event.

Winner	Runner-up	3/4	5/8	9/16	17/32	33/64	65/128
9,200	7,800	6,420	5,040	3,600	2,220	880	430

=== Prize pool ===
The total prize money was US$420,000 with the distribution of the prize money in accordance with BWF regulations.

Event	Winner	Finalist	Semi-finals	Quarter-finals	Last 16
Singles	$31,500	$15,960	$6,090	$2,520	$1,470
Doubles	$33,180	$15,960	$5,880	$3,045	$1,575

== Men's singles ==
=== Seeds ===
1. (Denmark) Anders Antonsen (quarter-finals)
2. (Japan) Kodai Naraoka (quarter-finals)
3. (Japan) Kenta Nishimoto (quarter-finals)
4. (India) Lakshya Sen (withdrew)
5. (Chinese Taipei) Lin Chun-yi (first round)
6. (Japan) Koki Watanabe (champion)
7. (Hong Kong) Ng Ka Long (quarter-finals)
8. (Denmark) Rasmus Gemke (first round)

=== Finals ===
Semi-finals
(India) Priyanshu Rajawat	17	10
(France) Alex Lanier	21	21
(Japan) Yushi Tanaka	20	13
6	(Japan) Koki Watanabe	22	21

Final
(France) Alex Lanier	22	17	6
6	(Japan) Koki Watanabe	20	21	21

=== Top half ===
==== Section 1 ====
First round
1	(Denmark) A Antonsen	21	21
Q4	(Australia) N Tang	15	4
(Republic of Ireland) N Nguyen	21	21
(Finland) K Koljonen	15	9
8	(Denmark) R Gemke	21	16	14
(India) P Rajawat	17	21	21
(Japan) T Obayashi	22	21
(Israel) M Zilberman	20	19

Second round
1	(Denmark) A Antonsen	21	21
(Republic of Ireland) N Nguyen	18	17
(India) P Rajawat	21	21
(Japan) T Obayashi	19	11

Quarter-finals
1	(Denmark) A Antonsen	11	21	19
(India) P Rajawat	21	17	21

==== Section 2 ====
First round
3	(Japan) K Nishimoto	21	21
(Finland) J Oldorff	13	13
Q1	(China) Wang ZX	21	22
(France) A Merklé	14	20
5	(Chinese Taipei) Lin C-y	20	15
(Chinese Taipei) Su L-y	22	21
PFQ	(India) S Subramanian	16	17
(France) A Lanier	21	21

Second round
3	(Japan) K Nishimoto	21	21
Q1	(China) Wang ZX	18	13
(Chinese Taipei) Su L-y	17	14
(France) A Lanier	21	21

Quarter-finals
3	(Japan) K Nishimoto	17	17
(France) A Lanier	21	21

=== Bottom half ===
==== Section 3 ====
First round
(Japan) Y Tanaka	21	21
PFQ	(Italy) G Toti	18	14
(China) Lei LX	20	16
SWM	(Canada) B Yang	22	21
(Spain) P Abián	12	21
(Czech Republic) J Louda	21	23
Q2	(Chinese Taipei) Wang P-w	10	11
7	(Hong Kong) Ng K L	21	21

Second round
(Japan) Y Tanaka	22	21
SWM	(Canada) B Yang	20	17
(Czech Republic) J Louda	17	7
7	(Hong Kong) Ng K L	21	21

Quarter-finals
(Japan) Y Tanaka	21	23
7	(Hong Kong) Ng K L	17	21

==== Section 4 ====
First round
(Chinese Taipei) Huang Y-k	21	13	14
(Thailand) K Wangcharoen	17	21	21
(India) A Shetty	14	11
6	(Japan) K Watanabe	21	21
(Singapore) J Teh	18	21	14
Q3	(Chinese Taipei) Liao J-f	21	15	21
(Japan) K Takahashi	19	22	12
2	(Japan) K Naraoka	21	20	21

Second round
(Thailand) K Wangcharoen	17	18
6	(Japan) K Watanabe	21	21
Q3	(Chinese Taipei) Liao J-f	7	13
2	(Japan) K Naraoka	21	21

Quarter-finals
6	(Japan) K Watanabe	21	16	21
2	(Japan) K Naraoka	18	21	11

== Women's singles ==
=== Seeds ===
1. (United States) Beiwen Zhang (semi-finals)
2. (Japan) Nozomi Okuhara (semi-finals)
3. (Thailand) Busanan Ongbamrungphan (champion)
4. (Denmark) Line Kjærsfeldt (final)
5. (Chinese Taipei) Sung Shuo-yun (second round)
6. (Chinese Taipei) Hsu Wen-chi (quarter-finals)
7. (Denmark) Mia Blichfeldt (withdrew)
8. (Denmark) Line Christophersen (second round)

=== Finals ===
Semi-finals
1	(United States) Beiwen Zhang	18	14
3	(Thailand) Busanan Ongbamrungphan	21	21
4	(Denmark) Line Kjærsfeldt	15	21	21
2	(Japan) Nozomi Okuhara	21	9	8

Final
3	(Thailand) Busanan Ongbamrungphan	21	21
4	(Denmark) Line Kjærsfeldt	16	14

=== Top half ===
==== Section 1 ====
First round
1	(United States) BW Zhang	22	21
(Chinese Taipei) Liang T-y	20	7
(Canada) R Chan	6	16
(Japan) M Suizu	21	21
8	(Denmark) L Christophersen	21	21
(United States) D Gupta	12	19
(United States) L Lam	21	21
(Peru) I Castillo	13	7

Second round
1	(United States) BW Zhang	21	21
(Japan) M Suizu	15	19
8	(Denmark) L Christophersen	21	18	13
(United States) L Lam	15	21	21

Quarter-finals
1	(United States) BW Zhang	21	21
(United States) L Lam	19	9

==== Section 2 ====
First round
3	(Thailand) B Ongbamrungphan	21	21
Q2	(Canada) C Hoang	8	8
Q1	(Canada) J Dent	13	22	14
(India) T Hemanth	21	20	21
SWM	(Canada) M Li	21	21
(Denmark) A Schulz	8	12
(India) A Upadhyaya	21	21
(Republic of Ireland) R Darragh	11	11

Second round
3	(Thailand) B Ongbamrungphan	21	21
(India) T Hemanth	11	13
SWM	(Canada) M Li	21	17	21
(India) A Upadhyaya	14	21	13

Quarter-finals
3	(Thailand) B Ongbamrungphan	21	15	21
SWM	(Canada) M Li	12	21	19

=== Bottom half ===
==== Section 3 ====
First round
(Japan) N Nidaira	21	21
Q4	(Spain) A Setien	14	9
Q3	(United States) E Shi	13	21	14
5	(Chinese Taipei) Sung S-y	21	16	21
(Canada) T Ng	16	16
(Denmark) J D Jakobsen	21	21
(Chinese Taipei) Huang Y-h	13	16
4	(Denmark) L Kjærsfeldt	21	21

Second round
(Japan) N Nidaira	22	16	21
5	(Chinese Taipei) Sung S-y	20	21	15
(Denmark) J D Jakobsen
4	(Denmark) L Kjærsfeldt	w	/	o

Quarter-finals
(Japan) N Nidaira	17	22
4	(Denmark) L Kjærsfeldt	21	24

==== Section 4 ====
First round
(Czech Republic) T Švábíková	14	18
(Hungary) V Sándorházi	21	21
PFQ	(United States) I Jaiswal	13	12
6	(Chinese Taipei) Hsu W-c	21	21
(Canada) W Y Zhang	26	21
(Ukraine) P Buhrova	24	11
(Hungary) Á Kőrösi	20	12
2	(Japan) N Okuhara	22	21

Second round
(Hungary) V Sándorházi	16	14
6	(Chinese Taipei) Hsu W-c	21	21
(Canada) W Y Zhang	12	9
2	(Japan) N Okuhara	21	21

Quarter-finals
6	(Chinese Taipei) Hsu W-c	18	9
2	(Japan) N Okuhara	21	21

== Men's doubles ==
=== Seeds ===
1. (Denmark) Kim Astrup / Anders Skaarup Rasmussen (champions)
2. (Denmark) Rasmus Kjær / Frederik Søgaard (semi-finals)
3. (England) Ben Lane / Sean Vendy (final)
4. (Japan) Kenya Mitsuhashi / Hiroki Okamura (semi-finals)
5. (Denmark) Andreas Søndergaard / Jesper Toft (quarter-finals)
6. (Canada) Adam Dong / Nyl Yakura (first round)
7. (Chinese Taipei) Chen Zhi-ray / Lin Yu-chieh (first round)
8. (Thailand) Peeratchai Sukphun / Pakkapon Teeraratsakul (second round)

=== Finals ===
Semi-finals
1	(Denmark) Kim Astrup (Denmark) Anders Skaarup Rasmussen	11	21	21
4	(Japan) Kenya Mitsuhashi (Japan) Hiroki Okamura	21	19	11
3	(England) Ben Lane (England) Sean Vendy	21	21
2	(Denmark) Rasmus Kjær (Denmark) Frederik Søgaard	10	17

Final
1	(Denmark) Kim Astrup (Denmark) Anders Skaarup Rasmussen	18	21	21
3	(England) Ben Lane (England) Sean Vendy	21	14	11

=== Top half ===
==== Section 1 ====
First round
1	(Denmark) K Astrup (Denmark) A S Rasmussen	21	21
(United States) Chen Z-y (United States) P Smith	16	15
(China) Cui HC (China) Peng JQ	21	21
(Bulgaria) I Rusev (Bulgaria) I Stoynov	12	13
5	(Denmark) A Søndergaard (Denmark) J Toft	21	21
Q2	(United States) A Lee (United States) S W Li	17	14
(United States) R Ma (Canada) D Zhou	22	9
(Germany) J R Jansen (Germany) K Neumann	24	21

Second round
1	(Denmark) K Astrup (Denmark) A S Rasmussen	12	22	21
(China) Cui HC (China) Peng JQ	21	20	9
5	(Denmark) A Søndergaard (Denmark) J Toft	21	21
(Germany) J R Jansen (Germany) K Neumann	18	15

Quarter-finals
1	(Denmark) K Astrup (Denmark) A S Rasmussen	27	21
5	(Denmark) A Søndergaard (Denmark) J Toft	25	13

==== Section 2 ====
First round
4	(Japan) K Mitsuhashi (Japan) H Okamura	21	21
(Canada) J Lai (Canada) J L-c Mak	16	9
(Chinese Taipei) Lu C (Chinese Taipei) Po L-w	20	21	21
(Chinese Taipei) Chang K-c (Chinese Taipei) Chen X-y	22	12	23
8	(Thailand) P Sukphun (Thailand) P Teeraratsakul	21	21
(Chinese Taipei) Chen C-k (Chinese Taipei) Chen S-f	11	13
(Scotland) C Grimley (Scotland) M Grimley	21	17
(Germany) B Geiss (Germany) J C Völker	8	8^{r}

Second round
4	(Japan) K Mitsuhashi (Japan) H Okamura	21	14	21
(Chinese Taipei) Chang K-c (Chinese Taipei) Chen X-y	9	21	13
8	(Thailand) P Sukphun (Thailand) P Teeraratsakul	19	12
(Scotland) C Grimley (Scotland) M Grimley	21	21

Quarter-finals
4	(Japan) K Mitsuhashi (Japan) H Okamura	21	21
(Scotland) C Grimley (Scotland) M Grimley	13	15

=== Bottom half ===
==== Section 3 ====
First round
(India) K P Garaga (India) K S Pratheek	21	21
(Canada) L K K Pong (England) L Pong	19	11
(Chinese Taipei) Lin B-w (Chinese Taipei) Su C-h	21	22
6	(Canada) A Dong (Canada) N Yakura	17	20
(Canada) J Ko (Canada) A Wong	18	21	14
Q4	(Canada) O Chen (Canada) A Mao	21	18	21
Q1	(Canada) K Barkman (Canada) V Ho	7	8
3	(England) B Lane (England) S Vendy	21	21

Second round
(India) K P Garaga (India) K S Pratheek	19	21	17
(Chinese Taipei) Lin B-w (Chinese Taipei) Su C-h	21	18	21
Q4	(Canada) O Chen (Canada) A Mao	9	5
3	(England) B Lane (England) S Vendy	21	21

Quarter-finals
(Chinese Taipei) Lin B-w (Chinese Taipei) Su C-h	16	19
3	(England) B Lane (England) S Vendy	21	21

==== Section 4 ====
First round
(Canada) K Lee (Canada) T A Lindeman	21	21
(United States) V Chiu (United States) J Yuan	19	18
(Chinese Taipei) Liu K-h (Chinese Taipei) Yang P-ha	21	21
7	(Chinese Taipei) Chen Z-r (Chinese Taipei) Lin Y-c	16	9
(Canada) J Yang (Canada) D Yao	20	16
Q3	(Canada) D Leung (Canada) T Lock	22	21
(Chinese Taipei) Lu M-c (Chinese Taipei) Tang K-w	21	19	22
2	(Denmark) R Kjær (Denmark) F Søgaard	17	21	24

Second round
(Canada) K Lee (Canada) T A Lindeman	15	13
(Chinese Taipei) Liu K-h (Chinese Taipei) Yang P-ha	21	21
Q3	(Canada) D Leung (Canada) T Lock	7	11
2	(Denmark) R Kjær (Denmark) F Søgaard	21	21

Quarter-finals
(Chinese Taipei) Liu K-h (Chinese Taipei) Yang P-ha	11	21	14
2	(Denmark) R Kjær (Denmark) F Søgaard	21	16	21

== Women's doubles ==
=== Seeds ===
1. (Japan) Rin Iwanaga / Kie Nakanishi (champions)
2. (Denmark) Maiken Fruergaard / Sara Thygesen (second round)
3. (India) Treesa Jolly / Gayatri Gopichand (quarter-finals)
4. (Thailand) Laksika Kanlaha / Phataimas Muenwong (semi-finals)
5. (United States) Annie Xu / Kerry Xu (second round)
6. (United States) Francesca Corbett / Allison Lee (second round)
7. (Japan) Rui Hirokami / Yuna Kato (second round)
8. (China) Keng Shuliang / Zhang Chi (quarter-finals)

=== Finals ===
Semi-finals
1	(Japan) Rin Iwanaga (Japan) Kie Nakanishi	18	21	21
4	(Thailand) Laksika Kanlaha (Thailand) Phataimas Muenwong	21	17	8
(Chinese Taipei) Hsieh Pei-shan (Chinese Taipei) Hung En-tzu	13	21	19
(Chinese Taipei) Hsu Yin-hui (Chinese Taipei) Lin Jhih-yun	21	11	21

Final
1	(Japan) Rin Iwanaga (Japan) Kie Nakanishi	21	21
(Chinese Taipei) Hsu Yin-hui (Chinese Taipei) Lin Jhih-yun	13	13

=== Top half ===
==== Section 1 ====
First round
(China) Wang TG (China) Wang YD	21	21
(Canada) T Ng (Canada) W Y Zhang	11	6
(Canada) C Y Pang (Canada) L Su	3	5
(Canada) J Dent (Canada) C Lai	21	21

Second round
1	(Japan) R Iwanaga (Japan) K Nakanishi	26	21
(China) Wang TG (China) Wang YD	24	17
8	(China) Keng SL (China) Zhang C	21	21
(Canada) J Dent (Canada) C Lai	19	14

Quarter-finals
1	(Japan) R Iwanaga (Japan) K Nakanishi	21	13	21
8	(China) Keng SL (China) Zhang C	17	21	11

==== Section 2 ====
First round
(Chinese Taipei) Lee C-c (Chinese Taipei) Lin Y-y	21	21
(Canada) N Nakatsui (Canada) A Yu	9	13
6	(United States) F Corbett (United States) A Lee	21	19	21
(United States) J Gai (United States) C Ho	13	21	10
(Germany) L Efler (Scotland) J MacPherson	21	21
(United States) A Chang (United States) K Sheung	5	12

Second round
4	(Thailand) L Kanlaha (Thailand) P Muenwong	21	21
(Chinese Taipei) Lee C-c (Chinese Taipei) Lin Y-y	12	15
6	(United States) F Corbett (United States) A Lee	21	21	15
(Germany) L Efler (Scotland) J MacPherson	17	23	21

Quarter-finals
4	(Thailand) L Kanlaha (Thailand) P Muenwong	21	21
(Germany) L Efler (Scotland) J MacPherson	12	17

=== Bottom half ===
==== Section 3 ====
First round
(United States) K Ngo (United States) J Siu	14	17
(Chinese Taipei) Hsieh P-s (Chinese Taipei) Hung E-t	21	21
(Canada) C Choi (Indonesia) S Kani	13	21	7
7	(Japan) R Hirokami (Japan) Y Kato	21	17	21
(Denmark) N P Anthonisen (Netherlands) A Tirtosentono	21	21
(Canada) C Hoang (Canada) E Zhang	13	14

Second round
(Chinese Taipei) Hsieh P-s (Chinese Taipei) Hung E-t	21	13	21
7	(Japan) R Hirokami (Japan) Y Kato	14	21	13
(Denmark) N P Anthonisen (Netherlands) A Tirtosentono	21	7	8
3	(India) T Jolly (India) G Gopichand	17	21	21

Quarter-finals
(Chinese Taipei) Hsieh P-s (Chinese Taipei) Hung E-t	21	19	21
3	(India) T Jolly (India) G Gopichand	18	21	16

==== Section 4 ====
First round
(Ukraine) P Buhrova (Ukraine) Y Kantemyr	14	19
(Chinese Taipei) Hsu Y-h (Chinese Taipei) Lin J-y	21	21
(Germany) I Lohau (Germany) T P Nguyen	17	21	21
(Sweden) M Sjöö (Sweden) T Sjöö	21	15	18

Second round
(Chinese Taipei) Hsu Y-h (Chinese Taipei) Lin J-y	13	21	21
5	(United States) A Xu (United States) K Xu	21	18	17
(Germany) I Lohau (Germany) T P Nguyen	21	21
2	(Denmark) M Fruergaard (Denmark) S Thygesen	12	14

Quarter-finals
(Chinese Taipei) Hsu Y-h (Chinese Taipei) Lin J-y	21	18	21
(Germany) I Lohau (Germany) T P Nguyen	16	21	18

== Mixed doubles ==
=== Seeds ===
1. (Denmark) Mathias Christiansen / Alexandra Bøje (final)
2. (Indonesia) Dejan Ferdinansyah / Gloria Emanuelle Widjaja (first round)
3. (United States) Vinson Chiu / Jennie Gai (first round)
4. (United States) Presley Smith / Allison Lee (quarter-finals)
5. (Thailand) Pakkapon Teeraratsakul / Phataimas Muenwong (quarter-finals)
6. (China) Zhou Zhihong / Yang Jiayi (first round)
7. (Indonesia) Praveen Jordan / Serena Kani (second round)
8. (Chinese Taipei) Chen Cheng-kuan / Hsu Yin-hui (semi-finals)

=== Finals ===
Semi-finals
1	(Denmark) Mathias Christiansen (Denmark) Alexandra Bøje	21	21
(Chinese Taipei) Lu Ming-che (Chinese Taipei) Hung En-tzu	4	15
8	(Chinese Taipei) Chen Cheng-kuan (Chinese Taipei) Hsu Yin-hui	19	14
(Denmark) Jesper Toft (Denmark) Amalie Magelund	21	21

Final
1	(Denmark) Mathias Christiansen (Denmark) Alexandra Bøje	21	22	12
(Denmark) Jesper Toft (Denmark) Amalie Magelund	9	24	21

=== Top half ===
==== Section 1 ====
First round
(Canada) M Ji (Canada) J Dent	5	14
(Scotland) A Dunn (Scotland) J MacPherson	21	21
5	(Thailand) P Teeraratsakul (Thailand) P Muenwong	21	21
(United States) A Lee (United States) K Ngo	17	10
(Germany) C Devereux (Germany) D Toepffer	8	9
(Chinese Taipei) Chang K-c (Chinese Taipei) Lin Y-y	21	21

Second round
1	(Denmark) M Christiansen (Denmark) A Bøje	21	21
(Scotland) A Dunn (Scotland) J MacPherson	14	11
5	(Thailand) P Teeraratsakul (Thailand) P Muenwong	21	18	21
(Chinese Taipei) Chang K-c (Chinese Taipei) Lin Y-y	12	21	19

Quarter-finals
1	(Denmark) M Christiansen (Denmark) A Bøje	21	21
5	(Thailand) P Teeraratsakul (Thailand) P Muenwong	18	14

==== Section 2 ====
First round
4	(United States) P Smith (United States) A Lee	13	21	21
(Canada) K Lee (Canada) E Zhang	21	18	10
(Canada) T Lock (Canada) C Hoang	21	19	10
(United States) Chen Z-y (United States) F Corbett	17	21	21
6	(China) Zhou ZH (China) Yang JY	21	13	17
(Chinese Taipei) Lu M-c (Chinese Taipei) Hung E-t	13	21	21
(Canada) J Lai (Canada) C Lai	21	21
(Canada) J Ko (Canada) E Kwan	12	13

Second round
4	(United States) P Smith (United States) A Lee	21	21
(United States) Chen Z-y (United States) F Corbett	12	16
(Chinese Taipei) Lu M-c (Chinese Taipei) Hung E-t	19	21	21
(Canada) J Lai (Canada) C Lai	21	8	12

Quarter-finals
4	(United States) P Smith (United States) A Lee	14	16
(Chinese Taipei) Lu M-c (Chinese Taipei) Hung E-t	21	21

=== Bottom half ===
==== Section 3 ====
First round
(India) T Kona (India) S K P Kudaravalli	9	9
(India) R Kapoor (India) Gadde R S	21	21
(Canada) O Chen (Canada) L Su	12	13
8	(Chinese Taipei) Chen C-k (Chinese Taipei) Hsu Y-h	21	21
(Germany) J R Jansen (Germany) T P Nguyen	21	21
(Germany) K Neumann (Germany) L Efler	11	19
(Chinese Taipei) Lu C (Chinese Taipei) Lee C-c	21	21
3	(United States) V Chiu (United States) J Gai	17	19

Second round
(India) R Kapoor (India) Gadde R S	15	21	9
8	(Chinese Taipei) Chen C-k (Chinese Taipei) Hsu Y-h	21	19	21
(Germany) J R Jansen (Germany) T P Nguyen	16	21	21
(Chinese Taipei) Lu C (Chinese Taipei) Lee C-c	21	17	23

Quarter-finals
8	(Chinese Taipei) Chen C-k (Chinese Taipei) Hsu Y-h	26	21
(Chinese Taipei) Lu C (Chinese Taipei) Lee C-c	24	14

==== Section 4 ====
First round
(Canada) A Mao (Canada) C Y Pang	15	6
(United States) J Yuan (United States) A Chang	21	21
(Israel) M Zilberman (Israel) S Zilberman	17	17
7	(Indonesia) P Jordan (Indonesia) S Kani	21	21
(Denmark) J Toft (Denmark) A Magelund	21	23
(Chinese Taipei) Chiu H-c (Chinese Taipei) Lin J-y	11	21
(Germany) J C Völker (Germany) I Lohau	21	15	21
2	(Indonesia) D Ferdinansyah (Indonesia) G E Widjaja	17	21	19

Second round
(United States) J Yuan (United States) A Chang	23	21	21
7	(Indonesia) P Jordan (Indonesia) S Kani	21	23	13
(Denmark) J Toft (Denmark) A Magelund	21	21
(Germany) J C Völker (Germany) I Lohau	11	18

Quarter-finals
(United States) J Yuan (United States) A Chang	18	11
(Denmark) J Toft (Denmark) A Magelund	21	21

Preceded by 2024 U.S. Open	BWF World Tour; 2024 BWF season	Succeeded by 2024 Baoji China Masters
