= 2024 U.S. Open (badminton) =

Badminton championships

Tournament details
- Dates: 25–30 June
- Level: Super 300
- Total prize money: US$210,000
- Venue: Fort Worth Convention Center
- Location: Fort Worth, Texas, United States

Champions
- Men's singles: (Japan) Yushi Tanaka
- Women's singles: (Japan) Natsuki Nidaira
- Men's doubles: (Thailand) Peeratchai Sukphun (Thailand) Pakkapon Teeraratsakul
- Women's doubles: (Japan) Rin Iwanaga (Japan) Kie Nakanishi
- Mixed doubles: (Thailand) Pakkapon Teeraratsakul (Thailand) Phataimas Muenwong

The 2024 U.S. Open (officially known as the Yonex US Open 2024 for sponsorship reasons) was a badminton tournament which took place at Fort Worth, Texas, United States, from 25 to 30 June 2024 and had a total purse of $210,000.

== Tournament ==
The 2024 U.S. Open was the eighteenth tournament of the 2024 BWF World Tour and also a part of the U.S. Open Badminton Championships which has been held since 1954. This tournament was organized by the USA Badminton and sanctioned by the BWF.

=== Venue ===
This international tournament was held at Fort Worth Convention Center, Texas, United States.

=== Point distribution ===
Below is the point distribution table for each phase of the tournament based on the BWF points system for the BWF World Tour Super 300 event.

Winner	Runner-up	3/4	5/8	9/16	17/32	33/64	65/128
7,000	5,950	4,900	3,850	2,750	1,670	660	320

=== Prize money ===
The total prize money for this tournament was US$210,000. Distribution of prize money was in accordance with BWF regulations.

Event	Winner	Finals	Semi-finals	Quarter-finals	Last 16
Singles	$15,750	$7,980	$3,045	$1,260	$735
Doubles	$16,590	$7,980	$2,940	$1,522.50	$787.50

== Men's singles ==
=== Seeds ===
1. (Chinese Taipei) Lin Chun-yi (first round)
2. (Japan) Koki Watanabe (semi-finals)
3. (Chinese Taipei) Su Li-yang (quarter-finals)
4. (China) Lei Lanxi (final)
5. (Japan) Takuma Obayashi (second round)
6. (France) Alex Lanier (first round)
7. (Guatemala) Kevin Cordón (first round)
8. (India) Priyanshu Rajawat (quarter-finals)

=== Finals ===
Semi-finals
(Singapore) Jason Teh	15	18
(Japan) Yushi Tanaka	21	21
4	(China) Lei Lanxi	21	21
2	(Japan) Koki Watanabe	18	14

Final
(Japan) Yushi Tanaka	15	21	21
4	(China) Lei Lanxi	21	18	15

=== Top half ===
==== Section 1 ====
First round
1	(Chinese Taipei) Lin C-y	20	18
(Brazil) J Matias	22	21
Q2	(Chinese Taipei) Liao J-f	13	21	21
(Finland) J Oldorff	21	17	9
5	(Japan) T Obayashi	21	22
(Thailand) K Wangcharoen	14	20
(India) A Shetty	21	12	12
(Singapore) J Teh	18	21	21

Second round
(Brazil) J Matias	19	10
Q2	(Chinese Taipei) Liao J-f	21	21
5	(Japan) T Obayashi	21	18	13
(Singapore) J Teh	18	21	21

Quarter-finals
Q2	(Chinese Taipei) Liao J-f	21	6	17
(Singapore) J Teh	16	21	21

==== Section 2 ====
First round
3	(Chinese Taipei) Su L-y	21	21
Q4	(Canada) XD Sheng	14	5
(Israel) M Zilberman	21	21
Q1	(Mexico) L Montoya	15	13
6	(France) A Lanier	18	21	15
(Brazil) Y Coelho	21	7	21
(Japan) Y Tanaka	15	21	21
(Italy) G Toti	21	16	10

Second round
3	(Chinese Taipei) Su L-y	21	21
(Israel) M Zilberman	14	12
(Brazil) Y Coelho	21	13	15
(Japan) Y Tanaka	17	21	21

Quarter-finals
3	(Chinese Taipei) Su L-y	21	14	19
(Japan) Y Tanaka	6	21	21

=== Bottom half ===
==== Section 3 ====
First round
(Chinese Taipei) Huang Y-k	21	21
(United States) H Shu	9	14
(Czech Republic) J Louda	16	18
8	(India) P Rajawat	21	21
Q3	(China) Wang ZX	21	19	18
PFQ	(Chinese Taipei) Wang P-w	18	21	21
(Germany) F Roth	16	17
4	(China) Lei LX	21	21

Second round
(Chinese Taipei) Huang Y-k	18	16
8	(India) P Rajawat	21	21
PFQ	(Chinese Taipei) Wang P-w	21	8	18
4	(China) Lei LX	17	21	21

Quarter-finals
8	(India) P Rajawat	21	11	18
4	(China) Lei LX	15	21	21

==== Section 4 ====
First round
(Republic of Ireland) N Nguyen	w	/	o
(Mexico) L Garrido
(El Salvador) U Canjura	20	22	21
7	(Guatemala) K Cordón	22	20	8
(France) A Merklé	21	22
(Japan) K Takahashi	17	20
PFQ	(Thailand) P Teeraratsakul	9	12
2	(Japan) K Watanabe	21	21

Second round
(Republic of Ireland) N Nguyen	17	9
(El Salvador) U Canjura	21	21
(France) A Merklé	20	15
2	(Japan) K Watanabe	22	21

Quarter-finals
(El Salvador) U Canjura	8	10
2	(Japan) K Watanabe	21	21

== Women's singles ==
=== Seeds ===
1. (United States) Beiwen Zhang (final)
2. (Thailand) Busanan Ongbamrungphan (quarter-finals)
3. (Scotland) Kirsty Gilmour (quarter-finals)
4. (Chinese Taipei) Sung Shuo-yun (quarter-finals)
5. (Chinese Taipei) Hsu Wen-chi (quarter-finals)
6. (Japan) Natsuki Nidaira (champion)
7. (India) Malvika Bansod (semi-finals)
8. (United States) Lauren Lam (first round)

=== Finals ===
Semi-finals
1	(United States) Beiwen Zhang	21	23
(Japan) Hina Akechi	12	21
7	(India) Malvika Bansod	16	13
6	(Japan) Natsuki Nidaira	21	21

Final
1	(United States) Beiwen Zhang	21	18	22
6	(Japan) Natsuki Nidaira	17	21	24

=== Top half ===
==== Section 1 ====
First round
1	(United States) BW Zhang	21	21
(Japan) M Suizu	13	16
(United States) D Gupta	17	14
(Peru) I Castillo	21	21
5	(Chinese Taipei) Hsu W-c	16	21	21
PFQ	(Spain) A Setién	21	8	13
Q1	(Canada) J Dent	9	9
Q3	(United States) N Chi	21	21

Second round
1	(United States) BW Zhang	21	21
(Peru) I Castillo	10	8
5	(Chinese Taipei) Hsu W-c	21	21
Q3	(United States) N Chi	8	16

Quarter-finals
1	(United States) BW Zhang	21	21
5	(Chinese Taipei) Hsu W-c	14	13

==== Section 2 ====
First round
4	(Chinese Taipei) Sung S-y	21	21
Q4	(Ukraine) Y Kantemyr	7	15
(Republic of Ireland) R Darragh	21	21
(France) R Cloteaux-Foucault	18	15
8	(United States) L Lam	20	18
(Japan) H Akechi	22	21
(United States) I Jaiswal	10	16
(Brazil) J Vieira	21	21

Second round
4	(Chinese Taipei) Sung S-y	21	21
(Republic of Ireland) R Darragh	15	12
(Japan) H Akechi	21	21
(Brazil) J Vieira	16	14

Quarter-finals
4	(Chinese Taipei) Sung S-y	14	14
(Japan) H Akechi	21	21

=== Bottom half ===
==== Section 3 ====
First round
(Canada) T Ng	16	21	11
(Czech Republic) T Švábíková	21	17	21
(Estonia) K Kuuba	14	15
7	(India) M Bansod	21	21
(Mexico) S Solís	11	17
Q2	(United States) E Shi	21	21
(Hungary) Á Kőrösi	17	17
3	(Scotland) K Gilmour	21	21

Second round
(Czech Republic) T Švábíková	21	19	14
7	(India) M Bansod	15	21	21
Q2	(United States) E Shi	16	15
3	(Scotland) K Gilmour	21	21

Quarter-finals
7	(India) M Bansod	10	21	21
3	(Scotland) K Gilmour	21	15	10

==== Section 4 ====
First round
(Ukraine) P Buhrova	21	21
(Chinese Taipei) Huang Y-h	15	16
(Hungary) V Sándorházi	15	19
6	(Japan) N Nidaira	21	21
(Chinese Taipei) Liang T-y	21	18	14
(Canada) R Chan	19	21	21
(Mexico) V García	7	12
2	(Thailand) B Ongbamrungphan	21	21

Second round
(Ukraine) P Buhrova	17	19
6	(Japan) N Nidaira	21	21
(Canada) R Chan	8	11
2	(Thailand) B Ongbamrungphan	21	21

Quarter-finals
6	(Japan) N Nidaira	21	21
2	(Thailand) B Ongbamrungphan	12	19

== Men's doubles ==
=== Seeds ===
1. (England) Ben Lane / Sean Vendy (semi-finals)
2. (Japan) Hiroki Okamura / Kenya Mitsuhashi (second round)
3. (Denmark) Jesper Toft / Andreas Søndergaard (quarter-finals)
4. (Thailand) Peeratchai Sukphun / Pakkapon Teeraratsakul (champions)
5. (United States) Vinson Chiu / Joshua Yuan (first round)
6. (India) Krishna Prasad Garaga / K. Sai Pratheek (second round)
7. (Chinese Taipei) Chen Zhi-ray / Lin Yu-chieh (second round)
8. (Scotland) Christopher Grimley / Matthew Grimley (second round)

=== Finals ===
Semi-finals
1	(England) Ben Lane (England) Sean Vendy	18	21	18
4	(Thailand) Peeratchai Sukphun (Thailand) Pakkapon Teeraratsakul	21	15	21
(Chinese Taipei) Chang Ko-chi (Chinese Taipei) Chen Xin-yuan	13	16
(Chinese Taipei) Liu Kuang-heng (Chinese Taipei) Yang Po-han	21	21

Final
4	(Thailand) Peeratchai Sukphun (Thailand) Pakkapon Teeraratsakul	13	21	21
(Chinese Taipei) Liu Kuang-heng (Chinese Taipei) Yang Po-han	21	16	11

=== Top half ===
==== Section 1 ====
First round
1	(England) B Lane (England) S Vendy	21	21
(Mexico) L Montoya (United States) T Tan	9	9
(Chinese Taipei) Chen C-k (Chinese Taipei) Chen S-f	21	15	13
(China) Cui HC (China) Peng JQ	15	21	21
7	(Chinese Taipei) Chen Z-r (Chinese Taipei) Lin Y-c	21	21
(Germany) J R Jansen (Germany) K Neumann	11	15
(Chinese Taipei) Lu C (Chinese Taipei) Po L-w	17	20
(Chinese Taipei) Lu M-c (Chinese Taipei) Tang K-w	21	22

Second round
1	(England) B Lane (England) S Vendy	21	18	21
(China) Cui HC (China) Peng JQ	16	21	10
7	(Chinese Taipei) Chen Z-r (Chinese Taipei) Lin Y-c	14	19
(Chinese Taipei) Lu M-c (Chinese Taipei) Tang K-w	21	21

Quarter-finals
1	(England) B Lane (England) S Vendy	21	18	21
(Chinese Taipei) Lu M-c (Chinese Taipei) Tang K-w	13	21	10

==== Section 2 ====
First round
4	(Thailand) P Sukphun (Thailand) P Teeraratsakul	21	21
(Canada) J Lai (Canada) J L-c Mak	11	10
Q3	(United States) A Q Lee (United States) S Xing	12	15
Q4	(United States) A Lee (United States) S W Li	21	21
6	(India) K P Garaga (India) K S Pratheek	21	21
(Republic of Ireland) S Guildea (Republic of Ireland) P Reynolds	14	12
(United States) Chen Z-y (United States) P Smith	21	21
(United States) Y Chen (United States) T Q Zhang	14	8

Second round
4	(Thailand) P Sukphun (Thailand) P Teeraratsakul	21	21
Q4	(United States) A Lee (United States) S W Li	9	10
6	(India) K P Garaga (India) K S Pratheek	17	21	19
(United States) Chen Z-y (United States) P Smith	21	19	21

Quarter-finals
4	(Thailand) P Sukphun (Thailand) P Teeraratsakul	21	21
(United States) Chen Z-y (United States) P Smith	12	11

=== Bottom half ===
==== Section 3 ====
First round
(Germany) B Geiss (Germany) J C Völker	21	21
Q2	(United States) B Dictado (United States) J H Lai	14	6
(Chinese Taipei) Chang K-c (Chinese Taipei) Chen X-y	21	14	21
5	(United States) V Chiu (United States) J Yuan	17	21	14
(Bulgaria) I Rusev (Bulgaria) I Stoynov	21	14	16
(Brazil) I Batalha (Brazil) M Voigt	12	21	21
(Brazil) F Farias (Brazil) D Silva	15	13
3	(Denmark) A Søndergaard (Denmark) J Toft	21	21

Second round
(Germany) B Geiss (Germany) J C Völker	16	17
(Chinese Taipei) Chang K-c (Chinese Taipei) Chen X-y	21	21
(Brazil) I Batalha (Brazil) M Voigt	15	14
3	(Denmark) A Søndergaard (Denmark) J Toft	21	21

Quarter-finals
(Chinese Taipei) Chang K-c (Chinese Taipei) Chen X-y	21	21	21
3	(Denmark) A Søndergaard (Denmark) J Toft	23	15	16

==== Section 4 ====
First round
(United States) K Fu (United States) J Zhang	7	5
(Chinese Taipei) Liu K-h (Chinese Taipei) Yang P-ha	21	21
(Chinese Taipei) Lin B-w (Chinese Taipei) Su C-h	14	15
8	(Scotland) C Grimley (Scotland) M Grimley	21	21
(Canada) K Barkman (Canada) V Ho	6	4
Q1	(Japan) K Matsui (Japan) K Tamate	21	21
(Canada) J Yang (Canada) D Yao	12	8
2	(Japan) K Mitsuhashi (Japan) H Okamura	21	21

Second round
(Chinese Taipei) Liu K-h (Chinese Taipei) Yang P-ha	21	21
8	(Scotland) C Grimley (Scotland) M Grimley	19	14
Q1	(Japan) K Matsui (Japan) K Tamate	21	10	22
2	(Japan) K Mitsuhashi (Japan) H Okamura	16	21	20

Quarter-finals
(Chinese Taipei) Liu K-h (Chinese Taipei) Yang P-ha	17	21	24
Q1	(Japan) K Matsui (Japan) K Tamate	21	19	22

== Women's doubles ==
=== Seeds ===
1. (Japan) Rin Iwanaga / Kie Nakanishi (champions)
2. (India) Treesa Jolly / Gayatri Gopichand (quarter-finals)
3. (Thailand) Laksika Kanlaha / Phataimas Muenwong (final)
4. (United States) Annie Xu / Kerry Xu (semi-finals)
5. (United States) Francesca Corbett / Allison Lee (quarter-finals)
6. (Japan) Rui Hirokami / Yuna Kato (semi-finals)
7. (China) Keng Shuliang / Zhang Chi (quarter-finals)
8. (Ukraine) Polina Buhrova / Yevheniia Kantemyr (quarter-finals)

=== Finals ===
Semi-finals
1	(Japan) Rin Iwanaga (Japan) Kie Nakanishi	21	21
4	(United States) Annie Xu (United States) Kerry Xu	12	17
3	(Thailand) Laksika Kanlaha (Thailand) Phataimas Muenwong	21	21
6	(Japan) Rui Hirokami (Japan) Yuna Kato	17	10

Final
1	(Japan) Rin Iwanaga (Japan) Kie Nakanishi	21	21
3	(Thailand) Laksika Kanlaha (Thailand) Phataimas Muenwong	19	15

=== Top half ===
==== Section 1 ====
First round
(United States) N Krawczyk (United States) J Yeung	10	13
(United States) J Gai (United States) C Ho	21	21

Second round
1	(Japan) R Iwanaga (Japan) K Nakanishi	21	21
(Denmark) N P Anthonisen (Netherlands) A Tirtosentono	9	11
5	(United States) F Corbett (United States) A Lee	21	21
(United States) J Gai (United States) C Ho	17	17

Quarter-finals
1	(Japan) R Iwanaga (Japan) K Nakanishi	21	21
5	(United States) F Corbett (United States) A Lee	17	13

==== Section 2 ====
First round
(Canada) J Dent (Canada) C Lai	15	16
(Chinese Taipei) Lee C-c (Chinese Taipei) Lin Y-y	21	21
(Sweden) M Sjöö (Sweden) T Sjöö	21	21
(United States) T Mertosono (United States) K Sheung	15	17

Second round
4	(United States) A Xu (United States) K Xu	20	21	21
(Chinese Taipei) Lee C-c (Chinese Taipei) Lin Y-y	22	16	6
8	(Ukraine) P Buhrova (Ukraine) Y Kantemyr	21	19	21
(Sweden) M Sjöö (Sweden) T Sjöö	11	21	15

Quarter-finals
4	(United States) A Xu (United States) K Xu	21	21
8	(Ukraine) P Buhrova (Ukraine) Y Kantemyr	13	14

=== Bottom half ===
==== Section 3 ====
First round
(Brazil) J Lima (Brazil) S Lima	12	18
(United States) A Chang (United States) E Lin	21	21
(Germany) L Efler (Scotland) J MacPherson	12	17
(China) Wang TG (China) Wang YD	21	21

Second round
(United States) A Chang (United States) E Lin	8	10
7	(China) Keng SL (China) Zhang C	21	21
(China) Wang TG (China) Wang YD	10	15
3	(Thailand) L Kanlaha (Thailand) P Muenwong	21	21

Quarter-finals
7	(China) Keng SL (China) Zhang C	18	25	18
3	(Thailand) L Kanlaha (Thailand) P Muenwong	21	23	21

==== Section 4 ====
First round
(United States) K Ngo (United States) J Siu	13	9
(Germany) I Lohau (Germany) T P Nguyen	21	21

Second round
(Germany) I Lohau (Germany) T P Nguyen	21	13	12
6	(Japan) R Hirokami (Japan) Y Kato	17	21	21
(Chinese Taipei) Hsieh P-s (Chinese Taipei) Hung E-t	21	11	19
2	(India) T Jolly (India) G Gopichand	16	21	21

Quarter-finals
6	(Japan) R Hirokami (Japan) Y Kato	21	17	21
2	(India) T Jolly (India) G Gopichand	17	21	19

== Mixed doubles ==
=== Seeds ===
1. (United States) Vinson Chiu / Jennie Gai (second round)
2. (United States) Presley Smith / Allison Lee (first round)
3. (Thailand) Pakkapon Teeraratsakul / Phataimas Muenwong (champions)
4. (Brazil) Fabrício Farias / Jaqueline Lima (second round)
5. (China) Zhou Zhihong / Yang Jiayi (second round)
6. (Indonesia) Praveen Jordan / Serena Kani (withdrew)
7. (Germany) Jones Ralfy Jansen / Thuc Phuong Nguyen (quarter-finals)
8. (Israel) Misha Zilberman / Svetlana Zilberman (first round)

=== Finals ===
Semi-finals
(Germany) Jan Colin Völker (Germany) Isabel Lohau	21	18	16
3	(Thailand) Pakkapon Teeraratsakul (Thailand) Phataimas Muenwong	15	21	21
(Chinese Taipei) Lu Chen (Chinese Taipei) Lee Chih-chen	20	24	17
(Denmark) Jesper Toft (Denmark) Amalie Magelund	22	22	21

Final
3	(Thailand) Pakkapon Teeraratsakul (Thailand) Phataimas Muenwong	15	21	21
(Denmark) Jesper Toft (Denmark) Amalie Magelund	21	19	13

=== Top half ===
==== Section 1 ====
First round
1	(United States) V Chiu (United States) J Gai	21	21
(United States) T Q Zhang (United States) A Chang	14	16
(Germany) J C Völker (Germany) I Lohau	21	21
(United States) K Chong (United States) E Lin	9	12
5	(China) Zhou ZH (China) Yang JY	22	18	21
(Chinese Taipei) Chang K-c (Chinese Taipei) Lin Y-y	20	21	15
(India) R Kapoor (India) Gadde R S	15	21	13
(Scotland) A Dunn (Scotland) J MacPherson	21	18	21

Second round
1	(United States) V Chiu (United States) J Gai	19	19
(Germany) J C Völker (Germany) I Lohau	21	21
5	(China) Zhou ZH (China) Yang JY	13	21	16
(Scotland) A Dunn (Scotland) J MacPherson	21	18	21

Quarter-finals
(Germany) J C Völker (Germany) I Lohau	21	21
(Scotland) A Dunn (Scotland) J MacPherson	14	11

==== Section 2 ====
First round
3	(Thailand) P Teeraratsakul (Thailand) P Muenwong	21	21
(United States) A Lee (United States) K Ngo	13	8
(United States) Z Xu (United States) N Krawczyk	15	12
(Brazil) D Silva (Brazil) S Lima	21	21
8	(Israel) M Zilberman (Israel) S Zilberman	13	12
(United States) J Yuan (United States) C Ho	21	21

Second round
3	(Thailand) P Teeraratsakul (Thailand) P Muenwong	21	21
(Brazil) D Silva (Brazil) S Lima	9	14
(United States) J Yuan (United States) C Ho	21	21
(Germany) C Devereux (Germany) D Toepffer	5	9

Quarter-finals
3	(Thailand) P Teeraratsakul (Thailand) P Muenwong	21	21
(United States) J Yuan (United States) C Ho	14	10

=== Bottom half ===
==== Section 3 ====
First round
(United States) L Wang (United States) E Wang	21	22
(Thailand) S Wasuwat (Guatemala) M Paiz	16	20
(Germany) K Neumann (Germany) L Efler	11	9
(Chinese Taipei) Lu C (Chinese Taipei) Lee C-c	21	21
(United States) Chen Z-y (United States) F Corbett	21	21
(Canada) J Lai (Canada) C Lai	13	18
(China) Cheng X (China) Li Q
4	(Brazil) F Farias (Brazil) J Lima	w	/	o

Second round
(United States) L Wang (United States) E Wang
(Chinese Taipei) Lu C (Chinese Taipei) Lee C-c	w	/	o
(United States) Chen Z-y (United States) F Corbett	21	21
4	(Brazil) F Farias (Brazil) J Lima	17	16

Quarter-finals
(Chinese Taipei) Lu C (Chinese Taipei) Lee C-c	w	/	o
(United States) Chen Z-y (United States) F Corbett

==== Section 4 ====
First round
(Chinese Taipei) Lu M-c (Chinese Taipei) Hung E-t	21	21
(United States) P Chi (United States) N Chi	9	9
(United States) J H Lai (United States) J Yeung	16	17
7	(Germany) J R Jansen (Germany) T P Nguyen	21	21
(Canada) J Yang (United States) B Tam	21	18	21
(Nepal) B Katwal (Nepal) N Tamang	10	21	11
(Denmark) J Toft (Denmark) A Magelund	21	22
2	(United States) P Smith (United States) A Lee	8	20

Second round
(Chinese Taipei) Lu M-c (Chinese Taipei) Hung E-t	10	9
7	(Germany) J R Jansen (Germany) T P Nguyen	21	21
(Canada) J Yang (United States) B Tam	18	18
(Denmark) J Toft (Denmark) A Magelund	21	21

Quarter-finals
7	(Germany) J R Jansen (Germany) T P Nguyen	11	19
(Denmark) J Toft (Denmark) A Magelund	21	21

Preceded by 2024 Kaohsiung Masters	BWF World Tour; 2024 BWF season	Succeeded by 2024 Canada Open
