= 2024 Canadian Open =

2024 Canadian Open can mean:

- 2024 Canadian Open (January) - Grand Slam of Curling tournament held in January 2024 in Red Deer, Alberta
- 2024 Canadian Open (November) - Grand Slam of Curling tournament held in November 2024 in Nisku, Alberta
- 2024 RBC Canadian Open - men's golf tournament held in June 2024 in Hamilton, Ontario
- 2024 CPKC Women's Open - women's golf tournament held in July 2024 in Calgary, Alberta
- 2024 National Bank Open - tennis tournament held in August 2024 in Montreal and Toronto
- 2024 Canada Open - badminton tournament held in July 2024 in Calgary, Alberta
- 2024 Canadian Open Chess Championship - chess tournament held in Laval, Quebec
