= Jesper Toft =

Danish badminton player (born 1999)

Personal information
- Born: 7 February 1999 (age 27) Dall Villaby, North Jutland Region, Denmark
- Height: 2.00 m (6 ft 7 in)

Sport
- Country: Denmark
- Sport: Badminton
- Handedness: Right

Men's & mixed doubles
- Highest ranking: 20 (MD with Andreas Søndergaard, 10 December 2024); 7 (XD with Amalie Magelund, 15 April 2025)
- Current ranking: 19 (XD with Amalie Magelund, 4 August 2026)
- BWF profile
Medal record
Men's badminton
Representing Denmark
European Championships
| Gold medal – first place | 2025 Horsens | Mixed doubles |
| Silver medal – second place | 2024 Saarbrücken | Men's doubles |
| Bronze medal – third place | 2026 Huelva | Mixed doubles |
European Mixed Team Championships
| Gold medal – first place | 2025 Baku | Mixed team |
European Junior Championships
| Bronze medal – third place | 2017 Mulhouse | Boys' doubles |
| Bronze medal – third place | 2017 Mulhouse | Mixed team |

Jesper Toft (born 7 February 1999) is a Danish badminton player. He won a gold medal at the 2025 European Championships in the mixed doubles and the silver medal in the men's doubles in 2024.

== Career ==
Born in Dall Villaby, a small town in the Aalborg Municipality, Toft started playing badminton at the age of four where his mother took him to the Svenstrup Badminton Club. He won the bronze medal in 2017 European Junior Championships in the boys' doubles with Daniel Lundgaard and won another bronze in the team event as well. In 2024, Toft won the silver medal at the European Championships with his partner Andreas Søndergaard, marking the first big achievement of his career. He then partnered with Amalie Magelund in June and only a month later reached his first super 500 level final at the Canada Open, where they defeated their teammates Mathias Christiansen and Alexandra Bøje. They then emerged victorious at the Hylo Open, their first Super 300 title.

== Achievements ==
=== European Championships ===
Men's doubles
| Year | Venue | Partner | Opponent | Score | Result |
|---|---|---|---|---|---|
| 2024 | Saarlandhalle, Saarbrücken, Germany | (Denmark) Andreas Søndergaard | (Denmark) Kim Astrup (Denmark) Anders Skaarup Rasmussen | 16–21, 15–21 | Silver |

Mixed doubles
| Year | Venue | Partner | Opponent | Score | Result |
|---|---|---|---|---|---|
| 2025 | Forum, Horsens, Denmark | (Denmark) Amalie Magelund | (France) Thom Gicquel (France) Delphine Delrue | 21–18, 21–19 | Gold |
| 2026 | Palacio de los Deportes Carolina Marín, Huelva, Spain | (Denmark) Amalie Magelund | (England) Callum Hemming (England) Estelle van Leeuwen | 21–23, 16–21 | Bronze |

=== European Junior Championships ===
Boys' doubles
| Year | Venue | Partner | Opponent | Score | Result |
|---|---|---|---|---|---|
| 2017 | Centre Sportif Régional d'Alsace; Mulhouse, France | (Denmark) Daniel Lundgaard | (France) Thom Gicquel (France) Toma Junior Popov | 14–21, 18–21 | Bronze |

=== BWF World Tour (3 titles, 2 runners-up) ===
The BWF World Tour, which was announced on 19 March 2017 and implemented in 2018, is a series of elite badminton tournaments sanctioned by the Badminton World Federation (BWF). The BWF World Tour is divided into levels of World Tour Finals, Super 1000, Super 750, Super 500, Super 300, and the BWF Tour Super 100.

Mixed doubles
| Year | Tournament | Level | Partner | Opponent | Score | Result |
|---|---|---|---|---|---|---|
| 2024 | U.S. Open | Super 300 | (Denmark) Amalie Magelund | (Thailand) Pakkapon Teeraratsakul (Thailand) Phataimas Muenwong | 21–15, 19–21, 13–21 | (silver) Runner-up |
| 2024 | Canada Open | Super 500 | (Denmark) Amalie Magelund | (Denmark) Mathias Christiansen (Denmark) Alexandra Bøje | 9–21, 24–22, 21–12 | (gold) Winner |
| 2024 | Hylo Open | Super 300 | (Denmark) Amalie Magelund | (Scotland) Alexander Dunn (Scotland) Julie MacPherson | 21–19, 21–16 | (gold) Winner |
| 2025 | Orléans Masters | Super 300 | (Denmark) Amalie Magelund | (Indonesia) Rehan Naufal Kusharjanto (Indonesia) Gloria Emanuelle Widjaja | 21–17, 21–13 | (gold) Winner |
| 2026 | Hylo Open | Super 500 | (Denmark) Amalie Cecille Kudsk | (France) Thom Gicquel (France) Delphine Delrue | 21–19, 20–22, 18–21 | (silver) Runner-up |

=== BWF International Challenge/Series (10 titles, 8 runners-up) ===
Men's doubles
| Year | Tournament | Partner | Opponent | Score | Result |
|---|---|---|---|---|---|
| 2022 | Luxembourg Open | (Denmark) Andreas Søndergaard | (Indonesia) Putra Erwiansyah (Indonesia) Patra Harapan Rindorindo | 21–15, 23–21 | (gold) Winner |
| 2022 | Welsh International | (Denmark) Andreas Søndergaard | (Denmark) Rasmus Kjær (Denmark) Frederik Søgaard | 19–21, 18–21 | (silver) Runner-up |
| 2023 | Belgian International | (Denmark) Andreas Søndergaard | (Denmark) Daniel Lundgaard (Denmark) Mads Vestergaard | 21–13, 26–24 | (gold) Winner |
| 2023 | Scottish Open | (Denmark) Andreas Søndergaard | (Denmark) Daniel Lundgaard (Denmark) Mads Vestergaard | 15–21, 21–11, 15–21 | (silver) Runner-up |
| 2023 | Irish Open | (Denmark) Andreas Søndergaard | (Scotland) Christopher Grimley (Scotland) Matthew Grimley | 20–22, 21–16, 17–21 | (silver) Runner-up |
| 2024 | Nantes International | (Denmark) Andreas Søndergaard | (England) Rory Easton (England) Alex Green | 21–18, 15–21, 21–19 | (gold) Winner |

Mixed doubles
| Year | Tournament | Partner | Opponent | Score | Result |
|---|---|---|---|---|---|
| 2021 | Belgian International | (Denmark) Clara Graversen | (Japan) Hiroki Midorikawa (Japan) Natsu Saito | 18–21, 9–21 | (silver) Runner-up |
| 2021 | Italian International | (Denmark) Clara Graversen | (England) Rory Easton (England) Annie Lado | 21–19, 21–16 | (gold) Winner |
| 2022 | Dutch International | (Denmark) Clara Graversen | (Hong Kong) Lee Chun Hei (Hong Kong) Ng Tsz Yau | 9–21, 14–21 | (silver) Runner-up |
| 2022 | Welsh International | (Denmark) Clara Graversen | (Germany) Mark Lamsfuß (Germany) Isabel Lohau | 21–18, 14–21, 21–16 | (gold) Winner |
| 2023 | Polish Open | (Denmark) Clara Graversen | (Denmark) Mads Vestergaard (Denmark) Christine Busch | 15–21, 13–21 | (silver) Runner-up |
| 2023 | Slovenia Open | (Denmark) Clara Graversen | (India) Rohan Kapoor (India) N. Sikki Reddy | 21–12, 21–13 | (gold) Winner |
| 2023 | Scottish Open | (Denmark) Clara Graversen | (Denmark) Mads Vestergaard (Denmark) Christine Busch | 15–21, 19–21 | (silver) Runner-up |
| 2024 | Denmark Challenge | (Denmark) Clara Graversen | (Denmark) Marcus Rindshøj (Sweden) Malena Norrman | 21–16, 21–11 | (gold) Winner |
| 2024 | Nantes International | (Denmark) Amalie Magelund | (England) Callum Hemming (England) Estelle van Leeuwen | 21–11, 21–13 | (gold) Winner |
| 2026 | Dutch Open | (Denmark) Amalie Cecilie Kudsk | (Denmark) Jeppe Søby (Denmark) Sofie Røjkjær | 11–21, 24–22, 23–21 | (silver) Runner-up |
| 2026 | Czech Open | (Denmark) Amalie Cecilie Kudsk | (Germany) Jan Colin Völker (Germany) Emma Moszczynski | 21–12, 21–13 | (gold) Winner |
| 2026 | Irish Open | (Denmark) Amalie Cecilie Kudsk | (South Korea) Jin Sung-ik (South Korea) Lee Seung-hee | 21–17, 21–16 | (gold) Winner |

BWF International Challenge tournament
BWF International Series tournament
BWF Future Series tournament

=== BWF Junior International (1 title) ===
Boys' doubles
| Year | Tournament | Partner | Opponent | Score | Result |
|---|---|---|---|---|---|
| 2016 | Danish Junior Cup | (Denmark) Rasmus Kjær | (France) Toma Junior Popov (Denmark) Karl Thor Søndergaard | 21–14, 17–21, 21–17 | (gold) Winner |

BWF Junior International Grand Prix tournament
BWF Junior International Challenge tournament
BWF Junior International Series tournament
BWF Junior Future Series tournament
