= Daniel Lundgaard =

Danish badminton player (born 2000)

Personal information
- Born: 2 July 2000 (age 26) Hillerød, Denmark
- Height: 1.83 m (6 ft 0 in)

Sport
- Country: Denmark
- Sport: Badminton
- Handedness: Right

Men's doubles
- Highest ranking: 12 (with Mads Vestergaard, 29 September 2026)
- Current ranking: 12 (with Mads Vestergaard, 17 November 2026)
- BWF profile
Medal record
Men's badminton
Representing Denmark
Thomas Cup
Bronze medal – third place	2026 Horsens	Men's team
European Championships
Bronze medal – third place	2025 Horsens	Men's doubles
Bronze medal – third place	2026 Huelva	Men's doubles
European Mixed Team Championships
Gold medal – first place	2025 Baku	Mixed team
European Men's Team Championships
Gold medal – first place	2024 Lodz	Men's team
Silver medal – second place	2026 Istanbul	Men's team
European Junior Championships
Bronze medal – third place	2017 Mulhouse	Mixed team
Bronze medal – third place	2017 Mulhouse	Men's doubles

Daniel Lundgaard (born 2 July 2000) is a Danish badminton player. He won the bronze medals in the men's doubles at the 2025 and 2026 European Championships with Mads Vestergaard.

== Biography ==
He is the son of former Danish national men's doubles player Martin Lundgaard Hansen.

== Career ==
In his junior days, Lundgaard won the men's doubles and mixed doubles titles at the 2017 Danish Junior Cup. He also won a bronze medal at the 2017 European Junior Championships in men's doubles with Jesper Toft.

In 2019, he partnered with Mathias Thyrri and won the men's doubles title at the Dutch International. In 2020, the duo reached the final of the SaarLorLux Open but lost to their compatriots Jeppe Bay and Lasse Mølhede.

In 2023, he formed a new partnership with Mads Vestergaard and reached four finals in that same year. In 2025, the duo reached the semi-finals of the European Championships but lost out to Christo Popov and Toma Junior Popov, settled for the bronze medal. In 2026, Lundgaard and Vestergaard made their first final at the Swiss Open where they lost against the Taiwanese twins of Lee Fang-chih and Lee Fang-jen in two straight games. This pair won their first title at the Malaysia Masters, beating the home pair Goh Sze Fei and Nur Izzuddin.

== Achievements ==
=== European Championships ===
Men's doubles
Year	Venue	Partner	Opponent	Score	Result	Ref.
2025	Forum; Horsens, Denmark	(Denmark) Mads Vestergaard	(France) Christo Popov (France) Toma Junior Popov	21–19, 18–21, 23–25	Bronze	
2026	Palacio de los Deportes Carolina Marín; Huelva, Spain	(Denmark) Mads Vestergaard	(England) Ben Lane (England) Sean Vendy	19–21, 17–21	Bronze	

=== European Junior Championships ===
Boys' doubles
Year	Venue	Partner	Opponent	Score	Result	Ref.
2017	Centre Sportif Régional d'Alsace; Mulhouse, France	(Denmark) Jesper Toft	(France) Thom Gicquel (France) Toma Junior Popov	14–21, 18–21	Bronze	

=== BWF World Tour (1 title, 2 runners-up) ===
The BWF World Tour, which was announced on 19 March 2017 and implemented in 2018, is a series of elite badminton tournaments sanctioned by the Badminton World Federation (BWF). The BWF World Tour is divided into levels of World Tour Finals, Super 1000, Super 750, Super 500, Super 300, and the BWF Tour Super 100.

Men's doubles
Year	Tournament	Level	Partner	Opponent	Score	Result	Ref.
2020	SaarLorLux Open	Super 100	(Denmark) Mathias Thyrri	(Denmark) Jeppe Bay (Denmark) Lasse Mølhede	13–21, 15–21	(silver) Runner-up	
2026	Swiss Open	Super 300	(Denmark) Mads Vestergaard	(Chinese Taipei) Lee Fang-chih (Chinese Taipei) Lee Fang-jen	18–21, 13–21	(silver) Runner-up	
2026	Malaysia Masters	Super 500	(Denmark) Mads Vestergaard	(Malaysia) Goh Sze Fei (Malaysia) Nur Izzuddin	21–16, 21–17	(gold) Winner	

=== BWF International Challenge/Series (6 titles, 2 runners-up) ===
Men's doubles
Year	Tournament	Partner	Opponent	Score	Result	Ref.
2019	Dutch International	(Denmark) Mathias Thyrri	(New Zealand) Oliver Leydon-Davis (New Zealand) Abhinav Manota	21–16, 15–21, 21–16	(gold) Winner	
2021	Denmark Masters	(Denmark) Mathias Thyrri	(France) Ronan Labar (France) Lucas Corvée	24–22, 21–19	(gold) Winner	
2023	Polish Open	(Denmark) Mads Vestergaard	(Chinese Taipei) Chang Ko-chi (Chinese Taipei) Po Li-wei	22–20, 16–21, 21–19	(gold) Winner	
2023	Mexican International	(Denmark) Mads Vestergaard	(Germany) Bjarne Geiss (Germany) Jan Colin Völker	22–24, 21–19, 21–17	(gold) Winner	
2023	Belgian International	(Denmark) Mads Vestergaard	(Denmark) Andreas Søndergaard (Denmark) Jesper Toft	13–21, 24–26	(silver) Runner-up	
2023	Scottish Open	(Denmark) Mads Vestergaard	(Denmark) Andreas Søndergaard (Denmark) Jesper Toft	21–15, 11–21, 21–15	(gold) Winner	
2025	Scottish Open	(Denmark) Mads Vestergaard	(South Korea) Lee Jong-min (South Korea) Wang Chan	23–21, 14–21, 21–14	(gold) Winner	

BWF International Challenge tournament
BWF International Series tournament
BWF Future Series tournament

=== BWF Junior International (2 titles) ===
Boys' doubles
Year	Tournament	Partner	Opponent	Score	Result	Ref.
2017	Danish Junior Cup	(Denmark) Karl Thor Søndergaard	(Denmark) Andreas Bøgebjerg (Denmark) Oliver Gram	21–15, 21–12	(gold) Winner	

Mixed doubles
Year	Tournament	Partner	Opponent	Score	Result	Ref.
2017	Danish Junior Cup	(Denmark) Amalie Magelund	(Denmark) Mads Muurholm (Denmark) Malene Kæseler	21–17, 24–22	(gold) Winner	

BWF Junior International Grand Prix tournament
BWF Junior International Challenge tournament
BWF Junior International Series tournament
BWF Junior Future Series tournament
