= Ciara Torrance =

Scottish badminton player (born 1999)

Personal information
- Born: 1 September 1999 (age 27) Prestwick, Scotland

Sport
- Country: Scotland
- Sport: Badminton
- Handedness: Right
- Coached by: Robert Blair; Ingo Kindervater

Women's & mixed doubles
- Highest ranking: 28 (WD with Julie MacPherson, 25 March 2025); 82 (XD with Alexander Dunn, 20 September 2022)
- Current ranking: 43 (WD with Julie MacPherson, 3 November 2026)
- BWF profile
Medal record
Women's badminton
Representing Scotland
European Women's Team Championships
Bronze medal – third place	2020 Liévin	Women's team
Bronze medal – third place	2024 Łódź	Women's team

Ciara Torrance (born 1 September 1999) is a Scottish badminton player who competes in international level events. She is a Scottish National women's doubles champion, winning in 2020 with her partner Julie MacPherson. Torrance was part of team Scotland that won the bronze medal at the 2020 European Women's Team Championships.

== Personal life ==
Ciara Torrance graduated from the Glasgow School of Sport, based at Bellahouston Academy. Her brother, Ben Torrance, also a badminton player who competing in the national and international events.

== Achievements ==
=== BWF International Challenge/Series (2 titles, 3 runners-up) ===
Women's doubles
Year	Tournament	Partner	Opponent	Score	Result
2021	Belgian International	(Scotland) Julie MacPherson	(Japan) Rin Iwanaga (Japan) Kie Nakanishi	12–21, 15–21	(silver) Runner-up
2024	Belgian International	(Scotland) Julie MacPherson	(France) Elsa Jacob (France) Camille Pognante	21–9, 21–11	(gold) Winner
2025	Belgian International	(Scotland) Julie MacPherson	(Bulgaria) Gabriela Stoeva (Bulgaria) Stefani Stoeva	14–21, 12–21	(silver) Runner-up
2025	Scottish Open	(Scotland) Julie MacPherson	(South Korea) Kim Min-ji (South Korea) Lee Ye-na	16–21, 21–15, 15–21	(silver) Runner-up

Mixed doubles
Year	Tournament	Partner	Opponent	Score	Result
2019	Welsh International	(Scotland) Alexander Dunn	(England) Matthew Clare (England) Hope Warner	21–14, 20–22, 21–17	(gold) Winner

BWF International Challenge tournament
BWF International Series tournament
BWF Future Series tournament

=== BWF Junior International (1 title, 1 runner-up) ===
Mixed doubles
Year	Tournament	Partner	Opponent	Score	Result
2016	Danish Junior Cup	(Scotland) Christopher Grimley	(Denmark) Rasmus Kjær (Denmark) Irina Amalie Andersen	21–11, 7–21, 23–25	(silver) Runner-up
2016	Czech Junior International	(Scotland) Christopher Grimley	(Scotland) Matthew Grimley (Scotland) Toni Woods	21–19, 21–17	(gold) Winner

BWF Junior International Grand Prix tournament
BWF Junior International Challenge tournament
BWF Junior International Series tournament
BWF Junior Future Series tournament
