= Rasmus Kjær =

Danish badminton player (born 1998)

Personal information
- Born: Rasmus Kjær Pedersen; 4 October 1998 (age 28) Glostrup, Denmark
- Height: 1.80 m (5 ft 11 in)

Sport
- Country: Denmark
- Sport: Badminton
- Handedness: Right

Men's doubles
- Highest ranking: 13 (with Frederik Søgaard, 27 August 2024)
- Current ranking: 20 (with Christian Faust Kjær, 3 November 2026)
- BWF profile
Medal record
Men's badminton
Representing Denmark
Thomas Cup
Bronze medal – third place	2026 Horsens	Men's team
European Championships
Bronze medal – third place	2024 Saarbrücken	Men's doubles
Bronze medal – third place	2025 Horsens	Men's doubles
European Mixed Team Championships
Gold medal – first place	2023 Aire-sur-la-Lys	Mixed team
Gold medal – first place	2025 Baku	Mixed team
European Men's Team Championships
Gold medal – first place	2024 Łódź	Men's team
Silver medal – second place	2026 Istanbul	Men's team
European Junior Championships
Bronze medal – third place	2017 Mulhouse	Mixed team

Rasmus Kjær Pedersen (born 4 October 1998) is a Danish badminton player. He won the bronze medals in the men's doubles at the 2024 and 2025 European Championships. Kjær was part of Danish winning team in the 2023 European Mixed Team Championships and 2024 European Men's Team Championships.

== Achievements ==
=== European Championships ===
Men's doubles
Year	Venue	Partner	Opponent	Score	Result	Ref.
2024	Saarlandhalle, Saarbrücken, Germany	(Denmark) Frederik Søgaard	(Denmark) Andreas Søndergaard (Denmark) Jesper Toft	15–21, 16–21	Bronze	
2025	Forum, Horsens, Denmark	(Denmark) Frederik Søgaard	(France) Éloi Adam (France) Léo Rossi	21–17, 14–21, 0–2 retired	Bronze	

=== BWF World Tour (1 title, 3 runners-up) ===
The BWF World Tour, which was announced on 19 March 2017 and implemented in 2018, is a series of elite badminton tournaments sanctioned by the Badminton World Federation (BWF). The BWF World Tours are divided into levels of World Tour Finals, Super 1000, Super 750, Super 500, Super 300 (part of the HSBC World Tour), and the BWF Tour Super 100.

Men's doubles
Year	Tournament	Level	Partner	Opponent	Score	Result
2023	Canada Open	Super 500	(Denmark) Frederik Søgaard	(Denmark) Kim Astrup (Denmark) Anders Skaarup Rasmussen	25–23, 16–21, 12–21	(silver) Runner-up
2024	Hylo Open	Super 300	(Denmark) Frederik Søgaard	(England) Ben Lane (England) Sean Vendy	21–18, 15–21, 18–21	(silver) Runner-up
2026	Canada Open	Super 300	(Denmark) Christian Faust Kjær	(Japan) Hiroki Okamura (Japan) Kyohei Yamashita	21–13, 10–21, 17–21	(silver) Runner-up
2026	Hylo Open	Super 500	(Denmark) Christian Faust Kjær	(England) Ben Lane (England) Sean Vendy	21–14, 21–18	(gold) Winner

=== BWF International Challenge/Series (9 titles, 5 runners-up) ===
Men's doubles
Year	Tournament	Partner	Opponent	Score	Result	Ref.
2016	Finnish International	(Denmark) Jeppe Bay	(Poland) Łukasz Moreń (Poland) Wojciech Szkudlarczyk	11–8, 11–2, 11–4	(gold) Winner	
2017	Slovenian International	(Denmark) Jeppe Bay	(Belgium) Matijs Dierickx (Belgium) Freek Golinski	13–21, 16–21	(silver) Runner-up	
2017	Bulgarian Open	(Denmark) Jeppe Bay	(Denmark) Mathias Thyrri (Denmark) Søren Toft Hansen	16–21, 12–21	(silver) Runner-up	
2018	Slovenian International	(Denmark) Jeppe Bay	(Denmark) Mads Emil Christensen (Denmark) Kristoffer Knudsen	21–14, 21–19	(gold) Winner	
2019	Austrian Open	(Denmark) Joel Eipe	(China) Guo Xinwa (China) Liu Shiwen	15–21, 22–20, 16–21	(silver) Runner-up	
2019	Spanish International	(Denmark) Joel Eipe	(Denmark) Mathias Boe (Denmark) Mads Conrad-Petersen	11–21, 10–21	(silver) Runner-up	
2022	Polish Open	(Denmark) Frederik Søgaard	(Chinese Taipei) Su Ching-heng (Chinese Taipei) Ye Hong-wei	21–16, 17–21, 21–19	(gold) Winner	
2022	Dutch International	(Denmark) Frederik Søgaard	(England) Alex Green (England) Jonty Russ	21–9, 21–19	(gold) Winner	
2022	Irish Open	(Denmark) Frederik Søgaard	(Japan) Ayato Endo (Japan) Yuta Takei	18–21, 12–21	(silver) Runner-up	
2022	Welsh International	(Denmark) Frederik Søgaard	(Denmark) Andreas Søndergaard (Denmark) Jesper Toft	21–19, 21–18	(gold) Winner	
2022	Canadian International	(Denmark) Frederik Søgaard	(Japan) Mahiro Kaneko (Japan) Hashiru Shimono	21–17, 21–17	(gold) Winner	
2023	Denmark Masters	(Denmark) Frederik Søgaard	(Chinese Taipei) Lu Ming-che (Chinese Taipei) Tang Kai-wei	21–5, 21–16	(gold) Winner	
2026	Estonian International	(Denmark) Christian Faust Kjær	(France) Baptiste Labarthe (France) Quentin Ronget	21–13, 21–12	(gold) Winner	
2026	Denmark Challenge	(Denmark) Christian Faust Kjær	(Japan) Takuto Goto (Japan) Tsubasa Yoshida	21–12, 21–14	(gold) Winner	

BWF International Challenge tournament
BWF International Series tournament
BWF Future Series tournament
