= Tobias Künzi =

Swiss badminton player

Personal information
- Born: 18 February 1998 (age 28) Würenlingen, Switzerland
- Height: 1.84 m (6 ft 0 in)

Sport
- Country: Switzerland
- Sport: Badminton
- Handedness: Right
- Coached by: Rajiv Ouseph

Men's singles
- Highest ranking: 88 (25 June 2024)
- Current ranking: 112 (31 July 2024)
- BWF profile

Tobias Künzi (born 18 February 1998) is a Swiss badminton player. He represented Switzerland in men's singles at the 2024 Summer Olympics.

== Career ==
In 2019, Künzi won his first international title in mixed doubles with Jenjira Stadelmann at the Cyprus International, beating Mykhaylo Makhnovskiy and Anastasiya Prozorova of Ukraine 21–11, 21–14. In 2023, he competed in the men's singles event at the 2023 European Games. He advanced to the knockout stage after defeating Bernardo Atilano of Portugal and Karl Kert of Estonia in the group stage. However, his progress was stopped after he lost in the round of 16.

In 2024, he competed in men's singles at the 2024 Summer Olympics. In his first match, he lost to the sixth seeded Li Shifeng of China 13–21, 13–21 in Group N. He won his second match against Anuoluwapo Juwon Opeyori of Nigeria 22–20, 21–14 but did not advance to the knockout stages.

== Achievements ==
=== BWF International Challenge/Series (1 title, 1 runner-up) ===
Men's singles
Year	Tournament	Opponent	Score	Result
2025	Venezuela International	(Sri Lanka) Dumindu Abeywickrama	21–10, 18–21, 12–21	(silver) Runner-up

Mixed doubles
Year	Tournament	Partner	Opponent	Score	Result
2019	Cyprus International	(Switzerland) Jenjira Stadelmann	(Ukraine) Mykhaylo Makhnovskiy (Ukraine) Anastasiya Prozorova	21–11, 21–14	(gold) Winner

BWF International Challenge tournament
BWF International Series tournament
BWF Future Series tournament
