= Andreas Søndergaard (badminton) =

Danish badminton player (born 1998)

Personal information
- Born: 3 May 1998 (age 28)

Sport
- Country: Denmark
- Sport: Badminton
- Handedness: Right
- Coached by: Thomas Stavngaard

Men's doubles
- Highest ranking: 20 (with Jesper Toft 26 November 2024)
- Current ranking: 92 (with Rasmus Espersen, 30 December 2025)
- BWF profile
Medal record
Men's badminton
Representing Denmark
European Championships
Silver medal – second place	2024 Saarbrücken	Men's doubles

Andreas Søndergaard (born 3 May 1998) is a Danish badminton player.

== Career ==
Søndergaard studied from Ikast Sports College in a small town of Ikast in Central Denmark Region. In 2018, he moved to Værløse in Danish Capital Region to pursue his dream of becoming a top badminton prospect from his country. He is considered to be a late bloomer, as his biggest successes came only in 2024 when he won the National Championships and most prominently a silver medal at the European Badminton Championships with partner Jesper Toft. En route to the final, they defeated seeded pairs of the tournament, including the second seed Rasmus Kjær and Frederik Søgaard, their compatriots. Following his performance, he was welcomed to join Denmark's elite men's doubles badminton program.

== Achievements ==
=== European Championships ===
Men's doubles
Year	Venue	Partner	Opponent	Score	Result
2024	Saarlandhalle; Saarbrücken, Germany	(Denmark) Jesper Toft	(Denmark) Kim Astrup (Denmark) Anders Skaarup Rasmussen	16–21, 15–21	Silver

=== BWF International Challenge/Series (5 titles, 8 runners-up) ===
Men's doubles
Year	Tournament	Partner	Opponent	Score	Result
2018	Welsh International	(Denmark) Mikkel Stoffersen	(England) Max Flynn (England) Callum Hemming	26–28, 17–21	(silver) Runner-up
2019	Norwegian International	(Denmark) Steve Olesen	(Chinese Taipei) Lee Fang-chih (Chinese Taipei) Lee Fang-jen	21–17, 16–21, 13–21	(silver) Runner-up
2022	Luxembourg Open	(Denmark) Jesper Toft	(Indonesia) Putra Erwiansyah (Indonesia) Patra Harapan Rindorindo	21–15, 23–21	(gold) Winner
2022	Hungarian International	(Denmark) Mads Thøgersen	(Chinese Taipei) Lin Yu-chieh (Chinese Taipei) Su Li-wei	12–21, 19–21	(silver) Runner-up
2022	Welsh International	(Denmark) Jesper Toft	(Denmark) Rasmus Kjær (Denmark) Frederik Søgaard	19–21, 18–21	(silver) Runner-up
2023	Belgian International	(Denmark) Jesper Toft	(Denmark) Daniel Lundgaard (Denmark) Mads Vestergaard	21–13, 26–24	(gold) Winner
2023	Scottish Open	(Denmark) Jesper Toft	(Denmark) Daniel Lundgaard (Denmark) Mads Vestergaard	15–21, 21–11, 15–21	(silver) Runner-up
2023	Irish Open	(Denmark) Jesper Toft	(Scotland) Christopher Grimley (Scotland) Matthew Grimley	20–22, 21–16, 17–21	(silver) Runner-up
2024	Nantes International	(Denmark) Jesper Toft	(England) Rory Easton (England) Alex Green	21–18, 15–21, 21–19	(gold) Winner
2025	Czech Open	(Denmark) Rasmus Espersen	(Japan) Yuto Noda (Japan) Shunya Ota	21–16, 21–14	(gold) Winner

Mixed doubles
Year	Tournament	Partner	Opponent	Score	Result
2022	Irish Open	(Denmark) Iben Bergstein	(England) Gregory Mairs (England) Jenny Moore	13–21, 16–21	(silver) Runner-up
2023	Portugal International	(Denmark) Iben Bergstein	(Canada) Joshua Hurlburt-Yu (Canada) Rachel Honderich	21–19, 22–20	(gold) Winner
2023	Luxembourg Open	(Denmark) Iben Bergstein	(Germany) Patrick Scheiel (Germany) Franziska Volkmann	23–25, 17–21	(silver) Runner-up

BWF International Challenge tournament
BWF International Series tournament
BWF Future Series tournament
