= Julie Macpherson =

Professor of Chemistry

- Education: University of Warwick
- Employer: University of Warwick
- Known for: Electrochemistry; Boron doped diamond

Julie Macpherson is a professor of chemistry at the University of Warwick. In 2017 she was awarded the Royal Society Innovation award for her research into boron doped diamond electrochemical sensors.

== Education ==
Macpherson completed her bachelor's degree in chemistry at the University of Warwick. She struggled to choose between chemistry and physics as an undergraduate. She completed her PhD at the University of Warwick under the supervision of Professor Patrick Unwin. Her doctoral research concentrated on the development of the scanning electrochemical microscope and developing means to understand microscope dissolution.

== Research and career ==
Macpherson was appointed a Royal Society University Research fellow in 1999, and earned a faculty position in 2000. For her postdoctoral research she switched topics from scanning probe microscopy, and instead concentrated on the creation hydrodynamic microelectrodes, including the micro-jet and radial flow micro-ring electrodes. She was promoted to reader in 2004 and professor in 2007.

Macpherson's current research focuses on developing novel electrochemical sensors based on carbon allotropes (diamond, nanotubes, graphene) for applications in healthcare, environmental monitoring and pharmaceutical analysis. She is using 3D printing and lithography to create the sensors. Her group are also identifying advanced scanning probe microscopy techniques for imaging surfaces for fuel cell catalysis, as well as investigating their sensors.

In 2014 she was awarded a Royal Society Industry Fellowship in recognition of her contributions to diamond electrochemistry. The fellowship allows Macpherson to develop all-diamond polycrystalline electrochemical sensors and combined electrochemical / spectroscopic technologies for identification of trace metals for contamination monitoring. She works in partnership with Element Six, a de Beers group company. Her interdisciplinary team grown synthetic diamonds in a laboratory and process them for novel applications.

In 2017 Macpherson was award the Royal Society Innovation award, worth £250,000, for her research into using boron doped diamond (BDD) as sensor for pH and chlorine for water quality control. BDD is a semiconductor doped with degenerated boron, with semi-metallic characteristics. She is co-director of the collaborative multi-institution Centre for Diamond Science and Technology.

Macpherson has published over 200 peer-reviewed articles and has a H-index of 46. She has filed 15 patents.

== Awards ==
Macpherson has won many awards for her teaching and research. She has won the University of Warwick Andrew McCamley Prize, awarded to the best undergraduate lecturer, in 2001, 2003, 2007 and 2013.

- 2017 – Royal Society Innovation Award
- 2015 – The Analytical Scientist magazine Top 50 Women in Analytical Science
- 2007 – University of Warwick Andrew McCamley Prize
- 2006 – Royal Society of Chemistry McBain Medal
- 2005 – Royal Society of Chemistry Marlow Medal
- 2005 – Times Higher Education Awards Young Researcher of the Year
- 2003 – University of Warwick Andrew McCamley Prize
- 2003 – Society of Electroanalytical Chemistry Charles N. Reilley Young Investigator Award
- 2002 – The Observer Young Alpha Female
- 2001 – University of Warwick Andrew McCamley Prize
- 1999 – Molecular Imaging's Scanned Probe Microscopist Award
