= Julie MacPherson =

Scottish badminton player (born 1997)

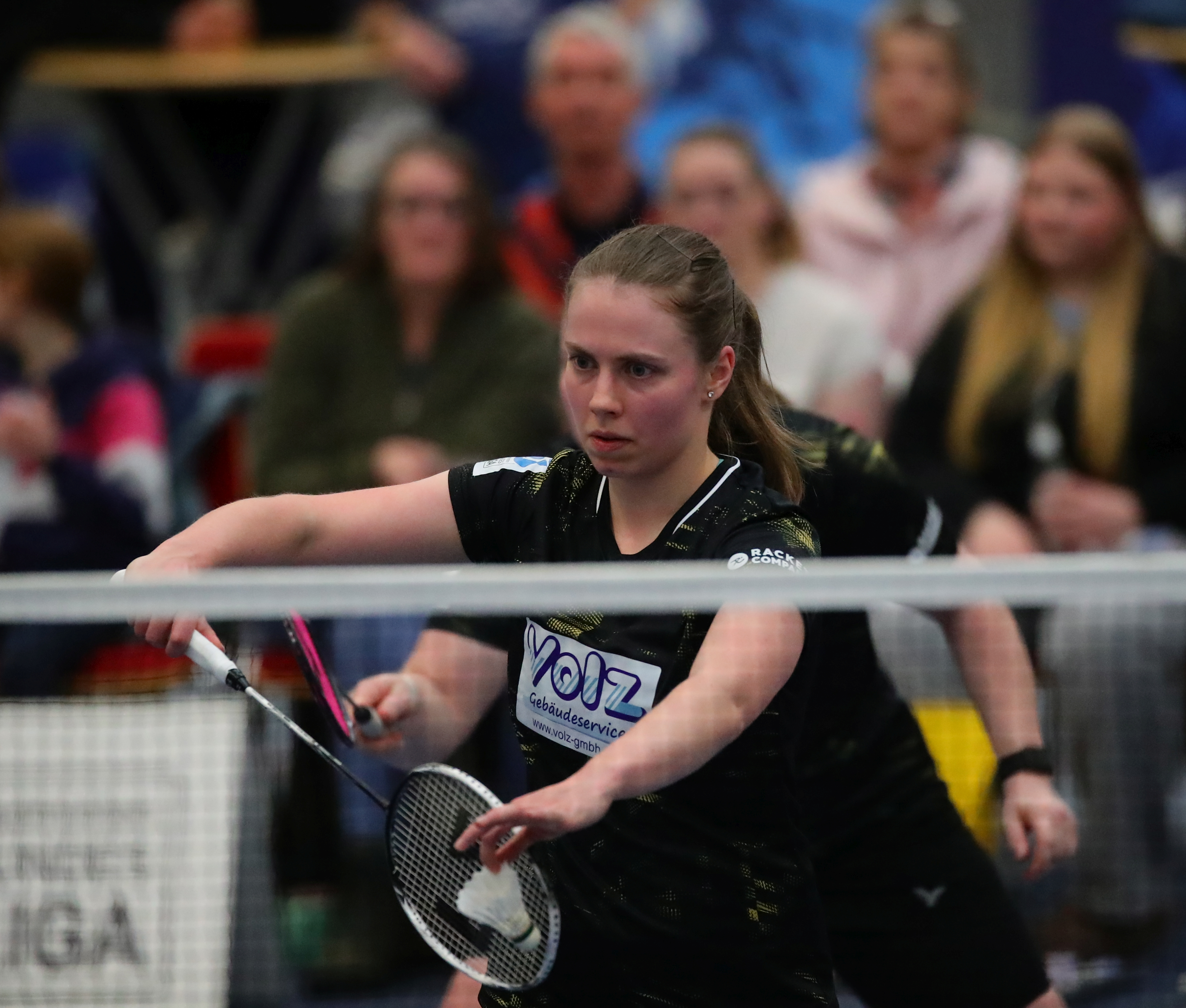
- Julie MacPherson in 2026

Personal information
- Born: Julie Claire MacPherson; 17 November 1997 (age 28) Edinburgh, Scotland
- Height: 1.62 m (5 ft 4 in)
- Weight: 58 kg (128 lb)

Sport
- Country: Scotland
- Sport: Badminton
- Handedness: Right
- Coached by: Robert Blair; Ingo Kindervater; Wong Tat Meng; Andy Bowman

Women's & mixed doubles
- Highest ranking: 28 (WD with Ciara Torrance, 25 March 2025); 21 (XD with Adam Hall, 27 December 2022); 21 (XD with Alexander Dunn, 28 October 2025)
- Current ranking: 43 (WD with Ciara Torrance), 31 (XD with Alexander Dunn) (3 November 2026)
- BWF profile
Medal record
Women's badminton
Representing Scotland
European Women's Team Championships
Bronze medal – third place	2020 Liévin	Women's team
Bronze medal – third place	2024 Łódź	Women's team

Julie Claire MacPherson (born 17 November 1997) is a Scottish badminton player who competes in international level events both for Scotland and Great Britain. She affiliates with club SV Fun-Ball Dortelweil She has won the Scottish National Championships ten times in the women's doubles and seven times in the mixed doubles. She also part of team Scotland that won the bronze medal at the 2020 European Women's Team Championships.

MacPherson won the girls' singles bronze medal at the European U17 Championships in 2014. She has competed at the 2018 Commonwealth Games where she reached the quarterfinals in the mixed team event. She has competed at the 2022 Commonwealth Games where she reached the semifinals in the mixed doubles.

== Achievements ==
=== BWF World Tour (1 runner-up) ===
The BWF World Tour, which was announced on 19 March 2017 and implemented in 2018, is a series of elite badminton tournaments sanctioned by the Badminton World Federation (BWF). The BWF World Tours are divided into levels of World Tour Finals, Super 1000, Super 750, Super 500, Super 300, and the BWF Tour Super 100.

Mixed doubles
Year	Tournament	Level	Partner	Opponent	Score	Result
2024	Hylo Open	Super 300	(Scotland) Alexander Dunn	(Denmark) Jesper Toft (Denmark) Amalie Magelund	19–21, 16–21	(silver) Runner-up

=== BWF International Challenge/Series (4 titles, 5 runners-up) ===
Women's doubles
Year	Tournament	Partner	Opponent	Score	Result
2018	Iceland International	(Scotland) Eleanor O'Donnell	(Denmark) Emilie Furbo (Denmark) Trine Villadsen	17–21, 21–13, 21–17	(gold) Winner
2018	Portugal International	(Scotland) Eleanor O'Donnell	(Chinese Taipei) Li Zi-qing (Chinese Taipei) Teng Chun-hsun	15–21, 13–21	(silver) Runner-up
2018	Welsh International	(Scotland) Holly Newall	(Denmark) Susan Ekelund (Denmark) Line Fleischer	22–20, 21–12	(gold) Winner
2021	Belgian International	(Scotland) Ciara Torrance	(Japan) Rin Iwanaga (Japan) Kie Nakanishi	12–21, 15–21	(silver) Runner-up
2024	Belgian International	(Scotland) Ciara Torrance	(France) Elsa Jacob (France) Camille Pognante	21–9, 21–11	(gold) Winner
2025	Belgian International	(Scotland) Ciara Torrance	(Bulgaria) Gabriela Stoeva (Bulgaria) Stefani Stoeva	14–21, 12–21	(silver) Runner-up
2025	Scottish Open	(Scotland) Ciara Torrance	(South Korea) Kim Min-ji (South Korea) Lee Ye-na	16–21, 21–15, 15–21	(silver) Runner-up

Mixed doubles
Year	Tournament	Partner	Opponent	Score	Result
2018	Belgian International	(Scotland) Adam Hall	(Netherlands) Jacco Arends (Netherlands) Selena Piek	11–21, 13–21	(silver) Runner-up
2024	Scottish Open	(Scotland) Alexander Dunn	(Spain) Rubén García (Spain) Lucía Rodríguez	23–21, 21–16	(gold) Winner

BWF International Challenge tournament
BWF International Series tournament
BWF Future Series tournament

=== BWF Junior International (2 runners-up) ===
Girls' doubles
Year	Tournament	Partner	Opponent	Score	Result
2014	Belgian Junior International	(Scotland) Holly Newall	(Germany) Eva Janssens (Germany) Yvonne Li	11–10, 8–11, 5–11, 9–11	(silver) Runner-up

Mixed doubles
Year	Tournament	Partner	Opponent	Score	Result
2015	Polish Junior International	(Scotland) Adam Hall	(France) Thomas Vallez (France) Delphine Delrue	15–21, 18–21	(silver) Runner-up

BWF Junior International Grand Prix tournament
BWF Junior International Challenge tournament
BWF Junior International Series tournament
BWF Junior Future Series tournament
