= Jan Colin Völker =

German badminton player

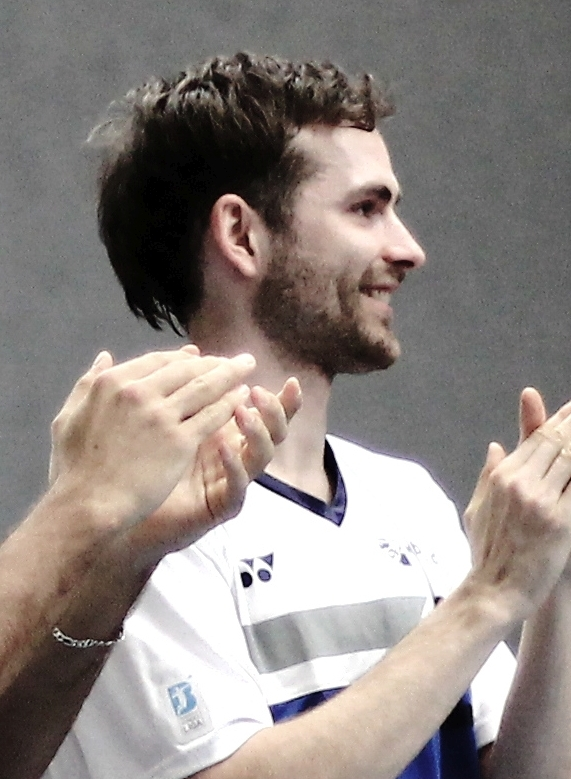
- Völker in 2025

Personal information
- Born: 26 February 1998 (age 28) Germany
- Height: 192 cm (6 ft 4 in)

Sport
- Country: Germany
- Sport: Badminton
- Handedness: Right

Men's & mixed doubles
- Highest ranking: 48 (MD with Bjarne Geiss 9 May 2023); 45 (XD with Stine Küspert 5 December 2023)
- Current ranking: 55 (MD with Bjarne Geiss), 76 (XD with Isabel Lohau) (8 April 2025)
- BWF profile
Medal record
Men's badminton
Representing Germany
European Mixed Team Championships
Silver medal – second place	2019 Copenhagen	Mixed team
Bronze medal – third place	2025 Baku	Mixed team

Jan Colin Völker (born 26 February 1998) is a German badminton player.

== Career ==
In 2018, Völker triumphed with his victories at the KaBal International and the St. Petersburg White Nights, winning international competitions for the first time.

The next year, Völker was successful in men's doubles at the Italian International, was included in the German national team's perspective squad, and became runner-up at 2019 European Men's Team Championships.

On the national level, Völker became the German champion in men's doubles in 2020 and 2021, after already standing on the podium in the two previous years. Alongside Stine Küspert, he reached the finals of the Ukraine Open and the Portugal International the following year. Additionally, Völker defended the national men's doubles title with Jones Ralfy Jansen and finished second in mixed doubles.

== Achievements ==
=== BWF International Challenge/Series (9 titles, 8 runners-up) ===
Men's doubles
Year	Tournament	Partner	Opponent	Score	Result
2018	White Nights	(Germany) Bjarne Geiss	(Germany) Johannes Pistorius (Germany) Daniel Hess	16–21, 24–22, 21–18	(gold) Winner
2018	KaBaL International	(Germany) Bjarne Geiss	(England) Peter Käsbauer (England) Johannes Pistorius	21–13, 21–14	(gold) Winner
2019	Italian International	(Germany) Bjarne Geiss	(France) Christo Popov (France) Toma Junior Popov	21–18, 21–16	(gold) Winner
2019	Belgian International	(Germany) Bjarne Geiss	(England) Sean Vendy (England) Ben Lane	11–21, 14–21	(silver) Runner-up
2022	Uganda International	(Germany) Jones Ralfy Jansen	(Malaysia) Boon Xin Yuan (Malaysia) Wong Tien Ci	15–21, 14–21	(silver) Runner-up
2022	Mexican International	(Germany) Jones Ralfy Jansen	(Japan) Shuntaro Mezaki (Japan) Haruya Nishida	15–21, 16–21	(silver) Runner-up
2023	Welsh International	(Germany) Bjarne Geiss	(Scotland) Matthew Grimley (England) Christopher Grimley	21–18, 16–21, 17–21	(silver) Runner-up
2025	Portugal International	(Germany) Bjarne Geiss	(France) Maël Cattoen (France) Lucas Renoir	21–8, 21–16	(gold) Winner

Mixed doubles
Year	Tournament	Partner	Opponent	Score	Result
2022	Portugal International	(Germany) Stine Küspert	(Chinese Taipei) Ye Hong-wei (Chinese Taipei) Lee Chia-hsin	10–21, 21–19, 9–21	(silver) Runner-up
2022	Ukraine Open	(Germany) Stine Küspert	(Germany) Jones Ralfy Jansen (Germany) Linda Efler	12–21, 11–21	(silver) Runner-up
2022	Canadian International	(Germany) Stine Küspert	(Denmark) Amalie Magelund (Denmark) Mathias Thyrri	17–21, 16–21	(silver) Winner
2023	Welsh International	(Germany) Stine Küspert	(England) Gregory Mairs (England) Jenny Mairs	22–20, 21–16	(gold) Winner
2025	Bonn International	(Germany) Stine Küspert	(Sweden) Filip Karlborg (Sweden) Tilda Sjöö	21–13, 22–24, 21–15	(gold) Winner
2026	Hungarian Future Series	(Germany) Emma Moszczynski	(Slovenia) Miha Ivančič (Slovenia) Anja Jordan	21–13, 23–21	(gold) Winner
2026	Austrian Open	(Germany) Emma Moszczynski	(India) Sathish Karunakaran (India) Zenith Abbigail	19–21, 21–13, 22–20	(gold) Winner
2026	Italian Open	(Germany) Emma Moszczynski	(Germany) Simon Krax (Germany) Amelie Lehmann	21–17, 21–13	(gold) Winner
2026	Czech Open	(Germany) Emma Moszczynski	(Denmark) Jesper Toft (Denmark) Amalie Cecilie Kudsk	12–21, 13–21	(silver) Runner-up

BWF International Challenge tournament
BWF International Series tournament
BWF Future Series tournament
