= Saarlandhalle =

Indoor sports arena in Saarbrücken, Germany

Coordinates: 49°14′51″N 6°59′3″E

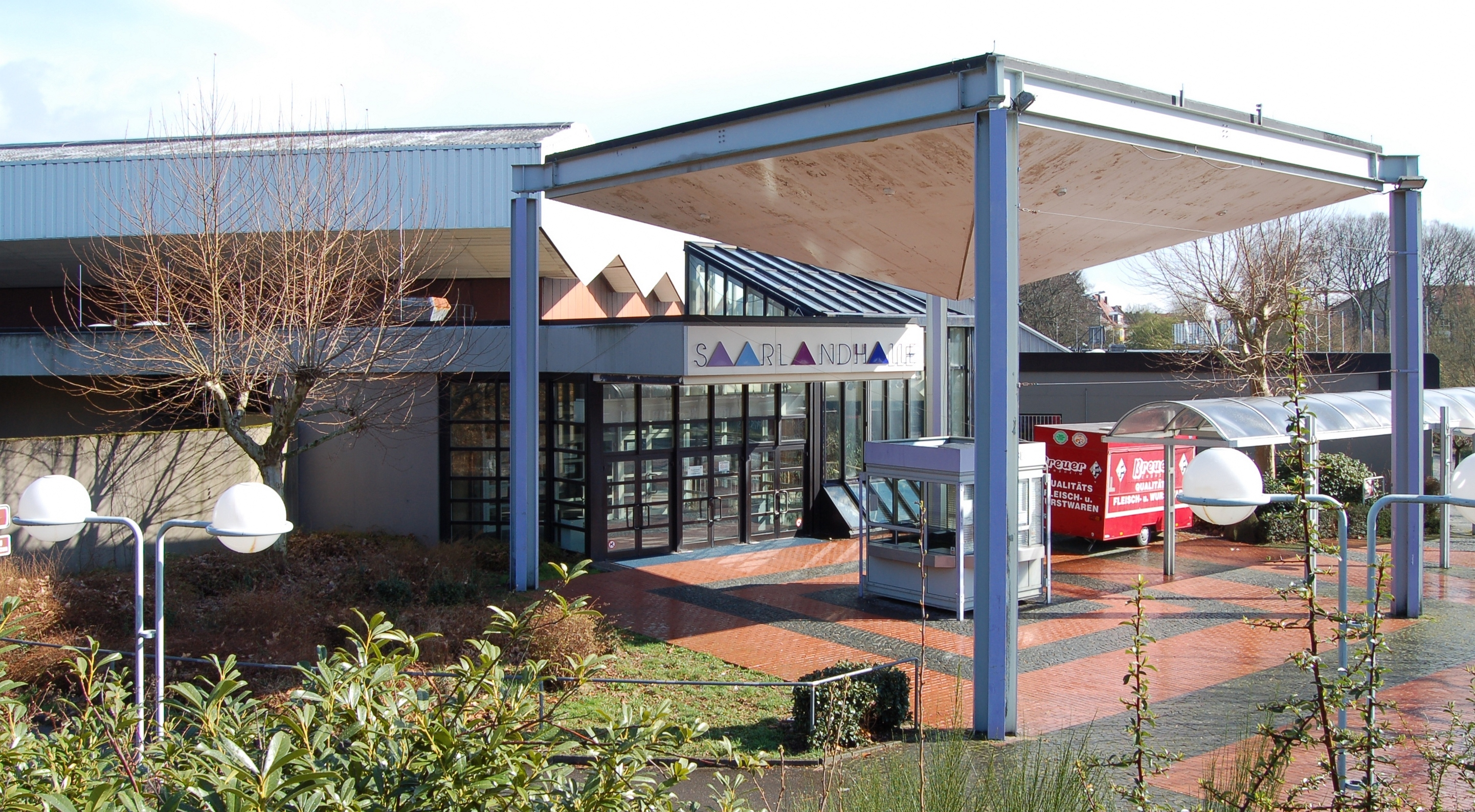
- Interactive map of Saarlandhalle
- Address: An der Saarlandhalle 1 Saarbrücken, Germany
- Capacity: 5,500

Construction
- Built: 1965-1967
- Opened: 1967
- Cost: 11.5 million DM
- Architect: Steinhauer/Geis

Saarlandhalle is a 5,500-capacity multi-purpose indoor arena located in Saarbrücken, Germany. Originally opened in 1967 with funds from Saarland Sporttoto for sports competitions, it was later converted to multi-purpose indoor arena. The Ludwigsparkstadion is located near the hall. Saarlandhalle is also the first indoor arena in (West) Germany to be organized as a limited liability company.

It has hosted concerts by many famous artists, including A-ha, AC/DC, Bon Jovi, Chris de Burgh, Depeche Mode, Bob Dylan, Boney M., Metallica, Pink Floyd, Sting and Uriah Heep, among others. These days larger productions refrain from visiting it, as technical requirements have generally extended to a degree which the Saarlandhalle cannot meet any longer with its given specs. For example, since the introduction of the show's new stage set in 2001, the hall is too small to host Europe's largest televised show, Wetten, dass..?.

The hall hosts the annual Hylo Open badminton tournament, and hosted the 1996 and 1997 German Open. In 2017 it hosted the 2017 German Darts Open.
