= 2023 Hylo Open =

2023 badminton tournament in Saarbrücken

Tournament details
- Dates: 31 October–5 November
- Level: Super 300
- Total prize money: US$210,000
- Venue: Saarlandhalle
- Location: Saarbrücken, Germany

Champions
- Men's singles: (Chinese Taipei) Chou Tien-chen
- Women's singles: (United States) Beiwen Zhang
- Men's doubles: (China) Liu Yuchen (China) Ou Xuanyi
- Women's doubles: (China) Zhang Shuxian (China) Zheng Yu
- Mixed doubles: (Hong Kong) Tang Chun Man (Hong Kong) Tse Ying Suet
- Official website: hylo-open.de/en/

The 2023 Hylo Open was a badminton tournament which took place at the Saarlandhalle in Saarbrücken, Germany, from 31 October to 5 November 2023 and had a total prize of US$210,000.

== Tournament ==
The 2023 Hylo Open was the twenty-ninth tournament of the 2023 BWF World Tour. It was a part of the Hylo Open, which had been held since 1988. This tournament was organized by the German Badminton Federation with sanction from the BWF.

=== Venue ===
This international tournament was held at the Saarlandhalle in Saarbrücken, Germany.

=== Point distribution ===
Below is the point distribution table for each phase of the tournament based on the BWF points system for the BWF World Tour Super 300 event.

Winner	Runner-up	3/4	5/8	9/16	17/32
7,000	5,950	4,900	3,850	2,750	1,670

=== Prize money ===
The total prize money for this tournament was US$210,000. The distribution of the prize money was in accordance with BWF regulations.

Event	Winner	Finalist	Semi-finals	Quarter-finals	Last 16
Singles	$15,750	$7,980	$3,045	$1,260	$735
Doubles	$16,590	$7,980	$2,940	$1,522.5	$787.5

== Men's singles ==
=== Seeds ===
1. (Chinese Taipei) Chou Tien-chen (Champion)
2. (Hong Kong) Lee Cheuk Yiu (Final)
3. (Hong Kong) Ng Ka Long (Second round)
4. (Malaysia) Ng Tze Yong (Second round)
5. (France) Toma Junior Popov (Semi-finals)
6. (France) Christo Popov (Quarter-finals)
7. (Denmark) Magnus Johannesen (Second round)
8. (Thailand) Kantaphon Wangcharoen (First round)

=== Finals ===
Semi-finals
1	(Chinese Taipei) Chou Tien-chen	21	19	21
(France) Alex Lanier	19	21	15
5	(France) Toma Junior Popov	17	12
2	(Hong Kong) Lee Cheuk Yiu	21	21

Final
1	(Chinese Taipei) Chou Tien-chen	21	21	21
2	(Hong Kong) Lee Cheuk Yiu	23	17	10

=== Top half ===
==== Section 1 ====
First round
1	(Chinese Taipei) Chou T-c	23	21
(Germany) F Roth	21	9
Q1	(France) L Claerbout	18	21	21
(Spain) L E Peñalver	21	14	7
8	(Thailand) K Wangcharoen	20	21	18
(Netherlands) M Caljouw	22	19	21
(Italy) G Toti	9	15
(Republic of Ireland) N Nguyen	21	21

Second round
1	(Chinese Taipei) Chou T-c	22	21
Q1	(France) L Claerbout	20	17
(Netherlands) M Caljouw	11	17
(Republic of Ireland) N Nguyen	21	21

Quarter-finals
1	(Chinese Taipei) Chou T-c	19	22	21
(Republic of Ireland) N Nguyen	21	20	18

==== Section 2 ====
First round
3	(Hong Kong) Ng K L	21	20	21
(India) K George	15	22	18
(Brazil) J Matias	17	13
(France) A Lanier	21	21
7	(Denmark) M Johannesen	21	21
(Denmark) M Christophersen	15	11
(India) S Subramanian	21	12	10
(Belgium) J Carraggi	16	21	21

Second round
3	(Hong Kong) Ng K L	18	21	13
(France) A Lanier	21	16	21
7	(Denmark) M Johannesen	14	12
(Belgium) J Carraggi	21	21

Quarter-finals
(France) A Lanier	14	23	22
(Belgium) J Carraggi	21	21	20

=== Bottom half ===
==== Section 3 ====
First round
(Azerbaijan) A R Dwicahyo	16	21	6
(Finland) K Koljonen	21	15	21
(Germany) K Schäfer	18	12
5	(France) T J Popov	21	21
(Czech Republic) J Louda	21	21
Q2	(Austria) L Wraber	12	8
Q4	(Germany) M Weißkirchen	8	13
4	(Malaysia) Ng T Y	21	21

Second round
(Finland) K Koljonen	11	0^{r}
5	(France) T J Popov	21	0
(Czech Republic) J Louda	21	21
4	(Malaysia) Ng T Y	10	7

Quarter-finals
5	(France) T J Popov	21	17	26
(Czech Republic) J Louda	14	21	24

==== Section 4 ====
First round
(Spain) P Abián	18	10
(France) A Merklé	21	21
Q3	(Netherlands) J Kweekel	10	15
6	(France) C Popov	21	21
(India) M Manjunath	21	21
(Italy) F Caponio	16	8
(Brazil) Y Coelho	16	16
2	(Hong Kong) Lee C Y	21	21

Second round
(France) A Merklé	12	14
6	(France) C Popov	21	21
(India) M Manjunath	13	17
2	(Hong Kong) Lee C Y	21	21

Quarter-finals
6	(France) C Popov	21	16	11
2	(Hong Kong) Lee C Y	17	21	21

== Women's singles ==
=== Seeds ===
1. (Spain) Carolina Marin (withdrew)
2. (United States) Beiwen Zhang (Champion)
3. (Thailand) Pornpawee Chochuwong (Semi-finals)
4. (Thailand) Busanan Ongbamrungphan (withdrew)
5. (Japan) Aya Ohori (Second round)
6. (Chinese Taipei) Hsu Wen-chi (First round)
7. (Germany) Yvonne Li (Quarter-finals)
8. (Chinese Taipei) Pai Yu-po (Second round)

=== Finals ===
Semi-finals
(Denmark) Line Kjærsfeldt	21	21
(Scotland) Kirsty Gilmour	16	17
3	(Thailand) Pornpawee Chochuwong
2	(United States) Beiwen Zhang	w	/	o

Final
(Denmark) Line Kjærsfeldt	18	21	16
2	(United States) Beiwen Zhang	21	16	21

=== Top half ===
==== Section 1 ====
First round
PFQ	(Canada) T Ng	22	11	15
(Denmark) L Kjærsfeldt	20	21	21
(Denmark) J D Jakobsen	21	17	21
(United States) L Lam	10	21	7
7	(Germany) Y Li	13	21	21
(Malaysia) Kisona S	21	11	8
Q2	(Czech Republic) T Švábíková	22	21
(Azerbaijan) K F Azzahra	20	16

Second round
(Denmark) L Kjærsfeldt	21	21
(Denmark) J D Jakobsen	15	11
7	(Germany) Y Li	21	22
Q2	(Czech Republic) T Švábíková	13	20

Quarter-finals
(Denmark) L Kjærsfeldt	21	18	21
7	(Germany) Y Li	12	21	14

==== Section 2 ====
First round
PFQ	(Republic of Ireland) R Darragh	8	18
(Brazil) J Vieira	21	21
(India) M Bansod	w	/	o
(Belgium) L Tan
5	(Japan) A Ohori	21	21
(Switzerland) J Stadelmann	17	9
PFQ	(Hungary) V Sándorházi	9	7
(Scotland) K Gilmour	21	21

Second round
(Brazil) J Vieira	20	10
(India) M Bansod	22	21
5	(Japan) A Ohori	21	18	14
(Scotland) K Gilmour	15	21	21

Quarter-finals
(India) M Bansod	8	14
(Scotland) K Gilmour	21	21

=== Bottom half ===
==== Section 3 ====
First round
(India) A Kashyap	13	16
(Spain) C Azurmendi	21	21
(Chinese Taipei) Sung S-y	22	21
6	(Chinese Taipei) Hsu W-c	20	17
PFQ	(Ukraine) P Buhrova	21	12	10
Q4	(Bulgaria) K Nalbantova	14	21	21
(Estonia) K Kuuba	21	21	9
3	(Thailand) P Chochuwong	23	18	21

Second round
(Spain) C Azurmendi	7	15
(Chinese Taipei) Sung S-y	21	21
Q4	(Bulgaria) K Nalbantova	9	10
3	(Thailand) P Chochuwong	21	21

Quarter-finals
(Chinese Taipei) Sung S-y	21	18	12
3	(Thailand) P Chochuwong	17	21	21

==== Section 4 ====
First round
(France) Qi XF	21	21
Q1	(Denmark) A Schulz	10	11
Q3	(Bulgaria) H Popovska	15	9
8	(Chinese Taipei) Pai Y-p	21	21
(Canada) WY Zhang	14	15
(Denmark) L Christophersen	21	21
(France) L Huet	18	12
2	(United States) BW Zhang	21	21

Second round
(France) Qi XF	21	21
8	(Chinese Taipei) Pai Y-p	17	13
(Denmark) L Christophersen	8	18
2	(United States) BW Zhang	21	21

Quarter-finals
(France) Qi XF	11	14
2	(United States) BW Zhang	21	21

== Men's doubles ==
=== Seeds ===
1. (Denmark) Kim Astrup / Anders Skaarup Rasmussen (withdrew)
2. (China) Liu Yuchen / Ou Xuanyi (Champions)
3. (Malaysia) Ong Yew Sin / Teo Ee Yi (Second round)
4. (Chinese Taipei) Lee Yang / Wang Chi-lin (Final)
5. (Chinese Taipei) Lu Ching-yao / Yang Po-han (withdrew)
6. (England) Ben Lane / Sean Vendy (Quarter-finals)
7. (Germany) Mark Lamsfuß / Marvin Seidel (Semi-finals)
8. (China) Tan Qiang / Zhou Haodong (Quarter-finals)

=== Finals ===
Semi-finals
7	(Germany) Mark Lamsfuß (Germany) Marvin Seidel	15	19
4	(Chinese Taipei) Lee Yang (Chinese Taipei) Wang Chi-lin	21	21
(Denmark) Andreas Søndergaard (Denmark) Jesper Toft	17	21	17
2	(China) Liu Yuchen (China) Ou Xuanyi	21	19	21

Final
4	(Chinese Taipei) Lee Yang (Chinese Taipei) Wang Chi-lin	22	13
2	(China) Liu Yuchen (China) Ou Xuanyi	24	21

=== Top half ===
==== Section 1 ====
First round
PFQ	(Germany) J R Jansen (Germany) K Neumann	18	21	21
(England) R Easton (England) Z Russ	21	14	19
(Netherlands) A Buijk (Netherlands) T van der Lecq	12	12
(China) He JT (China) Ren XY	21	21
7	(Germany) M Lamsfuß (Germany) M Seidel	21	21
(United States) V Chiu (United States) J Yuan	15	15
Q2	(England) J Jolly (England) R Webster	5	3
(Canada) A Dong (Canada) N Yakura	21	21

Second round
PFQ	(Germany) J R Jansen (Germany) K Neumann	11	11
(China) He JT (China) Ren XY	21	21
7	(Germany) M Lamsfuß (Germany) M Seidel	21	21
(Canada) A Dong (Canada) N Yakura	12	9

Quarter-finals
(China) He JT (China) Ren XY	21	15
7	(Germany) M Lamsfuß (Germany) M Seidel	23	21

==== Section 2 ====
First round
4	(Chinese Taipei) Lee Y (Chinese Taipei) Wang C-l	21	9
(Republic of Ireland) J Magee (Republic of Ireland) P Reynolds	10	3^{r}
PFQ	(Poland) M Sobolewski (Poland) A Szolc	11	18
PFQ	(Netherlands) D van Wijlick (Netherlands) B Wassink	21	21
8	(China) Tan Q (China) Zhou HD	21	21
(Scotland) C Grimley (Scotland) M Grimley	12	13
(Germany) B Geiss (Germany) J C Völker	21	21
(Czech Republic) O Král (Czech Republic) A Mendrek	13	17

Second round
4	(Chinese Taipei) Lee Y (Chinese Taipei) Wang C-l	21	21
PFQ	(Netherlands) D van Wijlick (Netherlands) B Wassink	17	13
8	(China) Tan Q (China) Zhou HD	21	22
(Germany) B Geiss (Germany) J C Völker	12	20

Quarter-finals
4	(Chinese Taipei) Lee Y (Chinese Taipei) Wang C-l	21	18	21
8	(China) Tan Q (China) Zhou HD	16	21	18

=== Bottom half ===
==== Section 3 ====
First round
(France) L Corvée (France) R Labar	19	21	19
(Denmark) A Søndergaard (Denmark) J Toft	21	16	21
Q3	(Netherlands) G Duijs (Netherlands) T Stoffelen	13	19
PFQ	(Germany) D Hess (Germany) P Scheiel	21	21
(China) Chen BY (China) Liu Y	21	21
Q1	(Germany) D Eckerlin (Germany) S Krax	13	14

Second round
(Denmark) A Søndergaard (Denmark) J Toft	21	21
PFQ	(Germany) D Hess (Germany) P Scheiel	13	15
(China) Chen BY (China) Liu Y	21	21
3	(Malaysia) Ong Y S (Malaysia) Teo E Y	12	19

Quarter-finals
(Denmark) A Søndergaard (Denmark) J Toft	21	18	21
(China) Chen BY (China) Liu Y	17	21	17

==== Section 4 ====
First round
(Denmark) D Lundgaard (Denmark) M Vestergaard	21	20	21
PFQ	(Netherlands) R Jille (France) J Maio	11	22	19
(England) C Hemming (England) E van Leeuwen	14	21
6	(England) B Lane (England) S Vendy	21	23
(France) É Adam (France) L Rossi	21	16	16
(France) C Popov (France) T J Popov	16	21	21
(United States) Chen Z-y (United States) P Smith	17	7
2	(China) Liu YC (China) Ou XY	21	21

Second round
(Denmark) D Lundgaard (Denmark) M Vestergaard	11	18
6	(England) B Lane (England) S Vendy	21	21
(France) C Popov (France) T J Popov	17	15
2	(China) Liu YC (China) Ou XY	21	21

Quarter-finals
6	(England) B Lane (England) S Vendy	21	17	18
2	(China) Liu YC (China) Ou XY	17	21	21

== Women's doubles ==
=== Seeds ===
1. (China) Zhang Shuxian / Zheng Yu (Champions)
2. (Indonesia) Apriyani Rahayu / Siti Fadia Silva Ramadhanti (Final)
3. (China) Li Wenmei / Liu Xuanxuan (withdrew)
4. (China) Liu Shengshu / Tan Ning (Semi-finals)
5. (Indonesia) Febriana Dwipuji Kusuma / Amallia Cahaya Pratiwi (Second round)
6. (Denmark) Maiken Fruergaard / Sara Thygesen (Quarter-finals)
7. (Bulgaria) Gabriela Stoeva / Stefani Stoeva (Second round)
8. (Chinese Taipei) Lee Chia-hsin / Teng Chun-hsun (Quarter-finals)

=== Finals ===
Semi-finals
1	(China) Zhang Shuxian (China) Zheng Yu	21	13	21
4	(China) Liu Shengshu (China) Tan Ning	8	21	15
(France) Margot Lambert (France) Anne Tran	12	15
2	(Indonesia) Apriyani Rahayu (Indonesia) Siti Fadia Silva Ramadhanti	21	21

Final
1	(China) Zhang Shuxian (China) Zheng Yu	18	1
2	(Indonesia) Apriyani Rahayu (Indonesia) Siti Fadia Silva Ramadhanti	21	1^{r}

=== Top half ===
==== Section 1 ====
First round
(Chinese Taipei) Sung S-y (Chinese Taipei) Yu C-h	21	22
(Germany) L Efler (Germany) I Lohau	17	20
6	(Denmark) M Fruergaard (Denmark) S Thygesen	21	22
(Scotland) J MacPherson (Scotland) C Torrance	14	20
(Hong Kong) Yeung N T (Hong Kong) Yeung P L	21	21
(Germany) S Küspert (Germany) E Moszczynski	13	10

Second round
1	(China) Zhang SX (China) Zheng Y	21	21
(Chinese Taipei) Sung S-y (Chinese Taipei) Yu C-h	7	13
6	(Denmark) M Fruergaard (Denmark) S Thygesen	21	21
(Hong Kong) Yeung N T (Hong Kong) Yeung P L	10	13

Quarter-finals
1	(China) Zhang SX (China) Zheng Y	21	21
6	(Denmark) M Fruergaard (Denmark) S Thygesen	11	12

==== Section 2 ====
First round
4	(China) Liu SS (China) Tan N	21	21
(India) R Panda (India) S Panda	15	5
(Turkey) B Erçetin (Turkey) N İnci	14	21	19
(United States) F Corbett (United States) A Lee	21	12	21
8	(Chinese Taipei) Lee C-h (Chinese Taipei) Teng C-h	21	21
(Canada) T Ng (Canada) WY Zhang	12	7
(United States) P L Cao Hok (United States) L Lam	21	21
(England) A Harris (England) A Lado	17	15

Second round
4	(China) Liu SS (China) Tan N	21	21
(United States) F Corbett (United States) A Lee	17	10
8	(Chinese Taipei) Lee C-h (Chinese Taipei) Teng C-h	21	21
(United States) P L Cao Hok (United States) L Lam	13	12

Quarter-finals
4	(China) Liu SS (China) Tan N	21	21
8	(Chinese Taipei) Lee C-h (Chinese Taipei) Teng C-h	14	9

=== Bottom half ===
==== Section 3 ====
First round
(England) L Tolman (England) E van Leeuwen	20	19
(France) M Lambert (France) A Tran	22	21
Q4	(Germany) J Meyer (Germany) L Michalski	9	8
7	(Bulgaria) G Stoeva (Bulgaria) S Stoeva	21	21
(Denmark) N P Anthonisen (Denmark) C Graversen	24	21
(Sweden) M Sjöö (Sweden) T Sjöö	22	12
(Netherlands) D Jille (Netherlands) C Seinen	21	21
PFQ	(Germany) A Lehmann (Germany) C Siebrecht	6	12

Second round
(France) M Lambert (France) A Tran	21	21
7	(Bulgaria) G Stoeva (Bulgaria) S Stoeva	15	15
(Denmark) N P Anthonisen (Denmark) C Graversen	7	13
(Netherlands) D Jille (Netherlands) C Seinen	21	21

Quarter-finals
(France) M Lambert (France) A Tran	19	21	21
(Netherlands) D Jille (Netherlands) C Seinen	21	17	16

==== Section 4 ====
First round
(China) Li YJ (China) Luo XM	16	21	21
Q2	(Denmark) J Finne-Ipsen (Denmark) M Surrow	21	10	8
(India) T Crasto (India) A Ponnappa	15	18
5	(Indonesia) F D Kusuma (Indonesia) A C Pratiwi	21	21
(Austria) S Au Yeong (Austria) K Hochmeir	18	21	18
Q3	(Netherlands) K de Wit (Netherlands) K van Buiten	21	17	21
(United States) A Xu (United States) K Xu	14	10
2	(Indonesia) A Rahayu (Indonesia) S F S Ramadhanti	21	21

Second round
(China) Li YJ (China) Luo XM	21	16	21
5	(Indonesia) F D Kusuma (Indonesia) A C Pratiwi	17	21	16
Q3	(Netherlands) K de Wit (Netherlands) K van Buiten	10	11
2	(Indonesia) A Rahayu (Indonesia) S F S Ramadhanti	21	21

Quarter-finals
(China) Li YJ (China) Luo XM	12	13
2	(Indonesia) A Rahayu (Indonesia) S F S Ramadhanti	21	21

== Mixed doubles ==
=== Seeds ===
1. (France) Thom Gicquel / Delphine Delrue (withdrew)
2. (China) Jiang Zhenbang / Wei Yaxin (withdrew)
3. (Denmark) Mathias Christiansen / Alexandra Bøje (Semi-finals)
4. (Malaysia) Goh Soon Huat / Shevon Jemie Lai (Second round)
5. (Netherlands) Robin Tabeling / Selena Piek (Quarter-finals)
6. (Chinese Taipei) Ye Hong-wei / Lee Chia-hsin (Semi-finals)
7. (Indonesia) Rehan Naufal Kusharjanto / Lisa Ayu Kusumawati (Final)
8. (Indonesia) Dejan Ferdinansyah / Gloria Emanuelle Widjaja (Quarter-finals)

=== Finals ===
Semi-finals
6	(Chinese Taipei) Ye Hong-wei (Chinese Taipei) Lee Chia-hsin	13	21	13
(Hong Kong) Tang Chun Man (Hong Kong) Tse Ying Suet	21	17	21
3	(Denmark) Mathias Christiansen (Denmark) Alexandra Bøje	21	17	19
7	(Indonesia) Rehan Naufal Kusharjanto (Indonesia) Lisa Ayu Kusumawati	15	21	21

Final
(Hong Kong) Tang Chun Man (Hong Kong) Tse Ying Suet	15	21	21
7	(Indonesia) Rehan Naufal Kusharjanto (Indonesia) Lisa Ayu Kusumawati	21	15	14

=== Top half ===
==== Section 1 ====
First round
PFQ	(England) Et van Leeuwen (England) A Lado	21	22
(Serbia) M Tomić (Serbia) A Vitman	18	20
(Germany) M Lamsfuß (Germany) I Lohau	21	21
(Denmark) J Toft (Denmark) C Graversen	14	14
6	(Chinese Taipei) Ye H-w (Chinese Taipei) Lee C-h	21	21
(Algeria) K Mammeri (Algeria) T Mammeri	19	13
Q3	(Netherlands) A Buijk (Netherlands) K van Buiten	12	14
(Hong Kong) Lee C H (Hong Kong) Ng T Y	21	21

Second round
PFQ	(England) Et van Leeuwen (England) A Lado	17	21	16
(Germany) M Lamsfuß (Germany) I Lohau	21	16	21
6	(Chinese Taipei) Ye H-w (Chinese Taipei) Lee C-h	21	15	23
(Hong Kong) Lee C H (Hong Kong) Ng T Y	17	21	21

Quarter-finals
(Germany) M Lamsfuß (Germany) I Lohau	20	22
6	(Chinese Taipei) Ye H-w (Chinese Taipei) Lee C-h	22	24

==== Section 2 ====
First round
4	(Malaysia) Goh S H (Malaysia) S J Lai	21	21
Q4	(Netherlands) D van Wijlick (Netherlands) K de Wit	12	10
(England) M Ellis (England) L Smith	11	19
(Hong Kong) Tang C M (Hong Kong) Tse Y S	21	21
8	(Indonesia) D Ferdinansyah (Indonesia) G E Widjaja	21	21
(Germany) J C Völker (Germany) S Küspert	16	18
PFQ	(China) He JT (China) Li YJ	21	14	14
(United States) P Smith (United States) A Lee	11	21	21

Second round
4	(Malaysia) Goh S H (Malaysia) S J Lai	13	14
(Hong Kong) Tang C M (Hong Kong) Tse Y S	21	21
8	(Indonesia) D Ferdinansyah (Indonesia) G E Widjaja	21	19	21
(United States) P Smith (United States) A Lee	14	21	15

Quarter-finals
(Hong Kong) Tang C M (Hong Kong) Tse Y S	21	20	21
8	(Indonesia) D Ferdinansyah (Indonesia) G E Widjaja	15	22	13

=== Bottom half ===
==== Section 3 ====
First round
(Malaysia) Tan K M (Malaysia) Lai P J	21	21
Q2	(Germany) M Bourakkadi (Germany) L Michalski	3	16
Q1	(Scotland) C Grimley (Scotland) E O'Donnell	14	21	10
5	(Netherlands) R Tabeling (Netherlands) S Piek	21	19	21
(Singapore) T Hee (Singapore) J Tan	21	21
(Scotland) A Hall (Scotland) J MacPherson	14	18
(Indonesia) P Jordan (Indonesia) M D Oktavianti	15	18
3	(Denmark) M Christiansen (Denmark) A Bøje	21	21

Second round
(Malaysia) Tan K M (Malaysia) Lai P J	16	21	16
5	(Netherlands) R Tabeling (Netherlands) S Piek	21	19	21
(Singapore) T Hee (Singapore) J Tan	16	21	12
3	(Denmark) M Christiansen (Denmark) A Bøje	21	16	21

Quarter-finals
5	(Netherlands) R Tabeling (Netherlands) S Piek	13	12
3	(Denmark) M Christiansen (Denmark) A Bøje	21	21

==== Section 4 ====
First round
(Denmark) M Vestergaard (Denmark) C Busch	21	21
PFQ	(Denmark) A Søndergaard (Denmark) I Bergstein	13	13
(Denmark) M Thyrri (Denmark) A Magelund	9	20
7	(Indonesia) R N Kusharjanto (Indonesia) L A Kusumawati	21	22
(United States) V Chiu (United States) J Gai	12	13
(England) G Mairs (England) J Mairs	21	21
(England) C Hemming (England) Es van Leeuwen	24	15	21
PFQ	(Germany) P Scheiel (Germany) F Volkmann	22	21	16

Second round
(Denmark) M Vestergaard (Denmark) C Busch	17	20
7	(Indonesia) R N Kusharjanto (Indonesia) L A Kusumawati	21	22
(England) G Mairs (England) J Mairs	14	21	13
(England) C Hemming (England) Es van Leeuwen	21	18	21

Quarter-finals
7	(Indonesia) R N Kusharjanto (Indonesia) L A Kusumawati	21	21
(England) C Hemming (England) Es van Leeuwen	14	12

Preceded by 2023 French Open; 2023 Indonesia Masters Super 100 II	BWF World Tour; 2023 BWF season	Succeeded by 2023 Korea Masters
