= 2025 French Open (badminton) =

Badminton tournament in France

Tournament details
- Dates: 21–26 October
- Edition: 93rd
- Level: Super 750
- Total prize money: US$950,000
- Venue: Glaz Arena
- Location: Cesson-Sévigné, France

Champions
- Men's singles: (Denmark) Anders Antonsen
- Women's singles: (South Korea) An Se-young
- Men's doubles: (South Korea) Kim Won-ho (South Korea) Seo Seung-jae
- Women's doubles: (Japan) Yuki Fukushima (Japan) Mayu Matsumoto
- Mixed doubles: (China) Feng Yanzhe (China) Huang Dongping

The 2025 French Open, officially known as the Yonex Internationaux de France de Badminton 2025 for sponsorship reasons, was a badminton tournament that took place at the Glaz Arena in Cesson-Sévigné, France, from 21 to 26 October 2025 and had a total prize of US$950,000.

== Tournament ==
The 2025 French Open was the thirty-first tournament of the 2025 BWF World Tour and is part of the French Open championships, which had been held since 1908. This tournament is organized by the French Badminton Federation with sanction from the BWF. Noted that this was the final professional tournament of Viktor Axelsen.

=== Venue ===
This tournament was held at the Glaz Arena in Cesson-Sévigné, France.

=== Point distribution ===
Below is the point distribution table for each phase of the tournament based on the BWF points system for the BWF World Tour Super 750 event.

Winner	Runner-up	3/4	5/8	9/16	17/32
11,000	9,350	7,700	6,050	4,320	2,660

=== Prize pool ===
The total prize money is US$950,000 with the distribution of the prize money in accordance with BWF regulations.

Event	Winner	Finalist	Semi-finals	Quarter-finals	Last 16	Last 32
Singles	$66,500	$32,300	$13,300	$5,225	$2,850	$950
Doubles	$70,300	$33,250	$13,300	$5,937.5	$3,087.5	$950

== Men's singles ==
=== Seeds ===
1. (China) Shi Yuqi (withdrew)
2. (Denmark) Anders Antonsen (champion)
3. (Thailand) Kunlavut Vitidsarn (semi-finals)
4. (China) Li Shifeng (semi-finals)
5. (Chinese Taipei) Chou Tien-chen (second round)
6. (Indonesia) Jonatan Christie (second round)
7. (France) Alex Lanier (first round)
8. (France) Christo Popov (final)

=== Finals ===
Semi-finals
3	(Thailand) Kunlavut Vitidsarn	11	20
8	(France) Christo Popov	21	22
4	(China) Li Shifeng	21	19	13
2	(Denmark) Anders Antonsen	15	21	21

Final
8	(France) Christo Popov	12	19
2	(Denmark) Anders Antonsen	21	21

=== Top half ===
==== Section 1 ====
First round
3	(Thailand) K Vitidsarn	14	21	21
(Chinese Taipei) Wang T-w	21	7	15
(Japan) K Naraoka	21	21
PFR	(Canada) V Lai	18	18
7	(France) A Lanier	15	16
(Indonesia) A Farhan	21	21
(Republic of Ireland) N Nguyen	21	21
(India) L Sen	7	16

Second round
3	(Thailand) K Vitidsarn	21	21
(Japan) K Naraoka	7	6
(Indonesia) A Farhan	16	21	21
(Republic of Ireland) N Nguyen	21	12	17

Quarter-finals
3	(Thailand) K Vitidsarn	21	16	21
(Indonesia) A Farhan	14	21	8

==== Section 2 ====
First round
8	(France) C Popov	21	21
(Chinese Taipei) Lin C-y	11	19
(France) T J Popov	16	17
(Chinese Taipei) Lee C-h	21	21
SWM	(Singapore) Loh K Y	16	15
(Chinese Taipei) Chi Y-j	21	21
(Hong Kong) Lee C Y	14	13
(Indonesia) A S Ginting	21	21

Second round
8	(France) C Popov	21	21
(Chinese Taipei) Lee C-h	14	16
(Chinese Taipei) Chi Y-j	14	25	21
(Indonesia) A S Ginting	21	23	15

Quarter-finals
8	(France) C Popov	21	21
(Chinese Taipei) Chi Y-j	13	7

=== Bottom half ===
==== Section 3 ====
First round
(Japan) K Watanabe	21	21
(India) A Shetty	19	19
(Japan) K Nishimoto	18	12
6	(Indonesia) J Christie	21	21
PFR	(Belgium) J Carraggi	9
(China) Weng HY	1^{r}
(China) Lu GZ	5^{r}
4	(China) Li SF	8

Second round
(Japan) K Watanabe	11	21	25
6	(Indonesia) J Christie	21	19	23
PFR	(Belgium) J Carraggi	16	21	6
4	(China) Li SF	21	8	21

Quarter-finals
(Japan) K Watanabe	18	21	17
4	(China) Li SF	21	15	21

==== Section 4 ====
First round
(Denmark) V Axelsen	21	21
(Malaysia) Leong J H	16	15
(Denmark) R Gemke	13	21	19
5	(Chinese Taipei) Chou T-c	21	14	21
(Japan) Y Tanaka	19	15
(Canada) B Yang	21	21
(Singapore) J Teh	13	15
2	(Denmark) A Antonsen	21	21

Second round
(Denmark) V Axelsen	21	23
5	(Chinese Taipei) Chou T-c	11	21
(Canada) B Yang	17	21	21
2	(Denmark) A Antonsen	21	19	23

Quarter-finals
(Denmark) V Axelsen	15	21	12
2	(Denmark) A Antonsen	21	17	21

== Women's singles ==
=== Seeds ===
1. (South Korea) An Se-young (champion)
2. (China) Wang Zhiyi (final)
3. (Japan) Akane Yamaguchi (quarter-finals)
4. (China) Han Yue (semi-finals)
5. (China) Chen Yufei (semi-finals)
6. (Thailand) Pornpawee Chochuwong (withdrew)
7. (Indonesia) Putri Kusuma Wardani (first round)
8. (Indonesia) Gregoria Mariska Tunjung (first round)

=== Finals ===
Semi-finals
1	(South Korea) An Se-young	23	18	21
5	(China) Chen Yufei	21	21	16
4	(China) Han Yue	14	22	14
2	(China) Wang Zhiyi	21	20	21

Final
1	(South Korea) An Se-young	21	21
2	(China) Wang Zhiyi	13	7

=== Top half ===
==== Section 1 ====
First round
1	(South Korea) An S-y	21	21
(India) A Kharb	15	9
(United States) BW Zhang	18	21	16
(Denmark) M Blichfeldt	21	15	21
8	(Indonesia) G M Tunjung	21	6	13
(China) Gao FJ	18	21	21
(Singapore) Yeo J M	18	21	11
(Japan) R Gunji	21	13	21

Second round
1	(South Korea) An S-y	21	21
(Denmark) M Blichfeldt	11	8
(China) Gao FJ	19	21	21
(Japan) R Gunji	21	19	10

Quarter-finals
1	(South Korea) An S-y	17	21	21
(China) Gao FJ	21	11	18

==== Section 2 ====
First round
3	(Japan) A Yamaguchi	21	21
(China) Han QX	13	17
(Denmark) L Christophersen	23	21
(Germany) Y Li	21	18
5	(China) Chen YF	21	11
(Thailand) B Ongbamrungphan	9	2^{r}
(Turkey) N Arın	21	21
(Ukraine) P Buhrova	10	11

Second round
3	(Japan) A Yamaguchi	21	21
(Denmark) L Christophersen	11	13
5	(China) Chen YF	21	21
(Turkey) N Arın	16	10

Quarter-finals
3	(Japan) A Yamaguchi	14	21	10
5	(China) Chen YF	21	16	21

=== Bottom half ===
==== Section 3 ====
First round
(Denmark) L Kjærsfeldt	17	18
(Scotland) K Gilmour	21	21
(Japan) T Miyazaki	21	21
7	(Indonesia) P K Wardani	18	15
(Chinese Taipei) Pai Y-p	14	19
(Canada) M Li	21	21
(India) A Upadhyaya	15	11
4	(China) Han Y	21	21

Second round
(Scotland) K Gilmour	21	17	13
(Japan) T Miyazaki	19	21	21
(Canada) M Li	12	23	16
4	(China) Han Y	21	21	21

Quarter-finals
(Japan) T Miyazaki	7	21	21
4	(China) Han Y	21	14	23

==== Section 4 ====
First round
PFR	(Canada) WY Zhang	8	14
(South Korea) Kim G-e	21	21
(Japan) N Nidaira	21	14	21
SWM	(Thailand) R Intanon	17	21	18
(Malaysia) Letshanaa K	21	13	16
(India) U Hooda	11	21	21
PFR	(Brazil) J V Vieira	19	11
2	(China) Wang ZY	21	21

Second round
(South Korea) Kim G-e	21	22
(Japan) N Nidaira	17	20
(India) U Hooda	14	11
2	(China) Wang ZY	21	21

Quarter-finals
(South Korea) Kim G-e	20	18
2	(China) Wang ZY	22	21

== Men's doubles ==
=== Seeds ===
1. (South Korea) Kim Won-ho / Seo Seung-jae (champions)
2. (Malaysia) Aaron Chia / Soh Wooi Yik (semi-finals)
3. (Malaysia) Goh Sze Fei / Nur Izzuddin (quarter-finals)
4. (China) Liang Weikeng / Wang Chang (first round)
5. (Denmark) Kim Astrup / Anders Skaarup Rasmussen (semi-finals)
6. (India) Satwiksairaj Rankireddy / Chirag Shetty (first round)
7. (Malaysia) Man Wei Chong / Tee Kai Wun (quarter-finals)
8. (Indonesia) Fajar Alfian / Muhammad Shohibul Fikri (final)

=== Finals ===
Semi-finals
1	(South Korea) Kim Won-ho (South Korea) Seo Seung-jae	21	19	21
5	(Denmark) Kim Astrup (Denmark) Anders Skaarup Rasmussen	9	21	9
8	(Indonesia) Fajar Alfian (Indonesia) Muhammad Shohibul Fikri	21	21
2	(Malaysia) Aaron Chia (Malaysia) Soh Wooi Yik	14	19

Final
1	(South Korea) Kim Won-ho (South Korea) Seo Seung-jae	10	21	21
8	(Indonesia) Fajar Alfian (Indonesia) Muhammad Shohibul Fikri	21	13	12

=== Top half ===
==== Section 1 ====
First round
1	(South Korea) Kim W-h (South Korea) Seo S-j	21	21
(Japan) H Midorikawa (Japan) K Yamashita	11	8
(Chinese Taipei) Liu K-h (Chinese Taipei) Yang P-ha	16	19
(Chinese Taipei) Chiu H-c (Chinese Taipei) Wang C-l	21	21
7	(Malaysia) Man W C (Malaysia) Tee K W	21	21
(South Korea) Kang M-h (South Korea) Ki D-j	9	13
(Malaysia) N M Azriyn A (Malaysia) Tan W K	14	13
(England) B Lane (England) S Vendy	21	21

Second round
1	(South Korea) Kim W-h (South Korea) Seo S-j	15	21	21
(Chinese Taipei) Chiu H-c (Chinese Taipei) Wang C-l	21	10	15
7	(Malaysia) Man W C (Malaysia) Tee K W	13	21	21
(England) B Lane (England) S Vendy	21	19	14

Quarter-finals
1	(South Korea) Kim W-h (South Korea) Seo S-j	18	21	21
7	(Malaysia) Man W C (Malaysia) Tee K W	21	14	10

==== Section 2 ====
First round
3	(Malaysia) Goh S F (Malaysia) N Izzuddin	15	21	21
(Japan) T Hoki (Japan) Y Kobayashi	21	19	11
(Chinese Taipei) Lee J-h (Chinese Taipei) Yang P-hs	21	23
(Thailand) K Kedren (Thailand) D Puavaranukroh	16	21
5	(Denmark) K Astrup (Denmark) A S Rasmussen	21	11	21
(China) Chen BY (China) Liu Yi	10	21	16
(Japan) T Nomura (Japan) Y Shimogami	18	21	21
(Scotland) C Grimley (Scotland) M Grimley	21	11	12

Second round
3	(Malaysia) Goh S F (Malaysia) N Izzuddin	18	23	21
(Chinese Taipei) Lee J-h (Chinese Taipei) Yang P-hs	21	21	14
5	(Denmark) K Astrup (Denmark) A S Rasmussen	21	21
(Japan) T Nomura (Japan) Y Shimogami	7	14

Quarter-finals
3	(Malaysia) Goh S F (Malaysia) N Izzuddin	14	21	23
5	(Denmark) K Astrup (Denmark) A S Rasmussen	21	17	25

=== Bottom half ===
==== Section 3 ====
First round
(Denmark) D Lundgaard (Denmark) M Vestergaard	22	21
(France) C Popov (France) T J Popov	20	15
(China) Huang D (China) Liu Ya	16	0^{r}
8	(Indonesia) F Alfian (Indonesia) M S Fikri	21	0
(France) É Adam (France) L Rossi	19	17
(Malaysia) J Arif (Malaysia) Yap R K	21	21
(China) Xie HN (China) Zeng WH	21	21
4	(China) Liang WK (China) Wang C	17	17

Second round
(Denmark) D Lundgaard (Denmark) M Vestergaard	14	16
8	(Indonesia) F Alfian (Indonesia) M S Fikri	21	21
(Malaysia) J Arif (Malaysia) Yap R K	21	21
(China) Xie HN (China) Zeng WH	12	17

Quarter-finals
8	(Indonesia) F Alfian (Indonesia) M S Fikri	21	24
(Malaysia) J Arif (Malaysia) Yap R K	14	22

==== Section 4 ====
First round
(Japan) K Mitsuhashi (Japan) H Okamura	15	7
(Indonesia) S K Gutama (Indonesia) M R P Isfahani	21	21
(Indonesia) M R Ardianto (Indonesia) R Hidayat	21	22
6	(India) S Rankireddy (India) C Shetty	18	20
(India) P Roy (India) K S Pratheek	18	13
(Malaysia) Ong Y S (Malaysia) Teo E Y	21	21
(Indonesia) L R Carnando (Indonesia) B Maulana	15	24
2	(Malaysia) A Chia (Malaysia) Soh W Y	21	26

Second round
(Indonesia) S K Gutama (Indonesia) M R P Isfahani	21	21
(Indonesia) M R Ardianto (Indonesia) R Hidayat	12	13
(Malaysia) Ong Y S (Malaysia) Teo E Y	10	22
2	(Malaysia) A Chia (Malaysia) Soh W Y	21	24

Quarter-finals
(Indonesia) S K Gutama (Indonesia) M R P Isfahani	19	21	19
2	(Malaysia) A Chia (Malaysia) Soh W Y	21	16	21

== Women's doubles ==
=== Seeds ===
1. (China) Liu Shengshu / Tan Ning (withdrew)
2. (Malaysia) Pearly Tan / Thinaah Muralitharan (quarter-finals)
3. (South Korea) Kim Hye-jeong / Kong Hee-yong (quarter-finals)
4. (Japan) Rin Iwanaga / Kie Nakanishi (quarter-finals)
5. (China) Chen Qingchen / Jia Yifan (semi-finals)
6. (South Korea) Baek Ha-na / Lee So-hee (quarter-finals)
7. (Japan) Yuki Fukushima / Mayu Matsumoto (champions)
8. (China) Li Yijing / Luo Xumin (final)

=== Finals ===
Semi-finals
7	(Japan) Yuki Fukushima (Japan) Mayu Matsumoto	21	21
SWM	(Japan) Arisa Igarashi (Japan) Chiharu Shida	13	13
8	(China) Li Yijing (China) Luo Xumin	21	21
5	(China) Chen Qingchen (China) Jia Yifan	16	17

Final
7	(Japan) Yuki Fukushima (Japan) Mayu Matsumoto	17	21	21
8	(China) Li Yijing (China) Luo Xumin	21	18	15

=== Top half ===
==== Section 1 ====
First round
4	(Japan) R Iwanaga (Japan) K Nakanishi	21	21
(Ukraine) P Buhrova (Ukraine) Y Kantemyr	15	8
(Indonesia) F D Kusuma (Indonesia) M T Puspita Sari	21	21
PFR	(Spain) N Carulla (Spain) C M Jimenez	16	6
7	(Japan) Y Fukushima (Japan) M Matsumoto	21	21
(Spain) P López (Spain) L Rodríguez	13	14
(South Korea) Jeong N-e (South Korea) Lee Y-w	21	21
(Turkey) B Erçetin (Turkey) N İnci	9	6

Second round
4	(Japan) R Iwanaga (Japan) K Nakanishi	19	21	21
(Indonesia) F D Kusuma (Indonesia) M T Puspita Sari	21	19	18
7	(Japan) Y Fukushima (Japan) M Matsumoto	21	21
(South Korea) Jeong N-e (South Korea) Lee Y-w	13	10

Quarter-finals
4	(Japan) R Iwanaga (Japan) K Nakanishi	14	10
7	(Japan) Y Fukushima (Japan) M Matsumoto	21	21

==== Section 2 ====
First round
6	(South Korea) Baek H-n (South Korea) Lee S-h	21	21
(Chinese Taipei) Teng C-h (Chinese Taipei) Yang C-y	13	12
(United States) F Corbett (United States) J Gai	20	18
(Indonesia) R A Rose (Indonesia) F Setianingrum	22	21
SWM	(Japan) A Igarashi (Japan) C Shida	21	21
(Thailand) B Aimsaard (Thailand) S S Wedler	5	14
(Indonesia) L T Mayasari (Indonesia) A C Pratiwi	21	21
(Brazil) J Lima (Brazil) S Lima	9	11

Second round
6	(South Korea) Baek H-n (South Korea) Lee S-h	21	14	21
(Indonesia) R A Rose (Indonesia) F Setianingrum	11	21	14
SWM	(Japan) A Igarashi (Japan) C Shida	21	21
(Indonesia) L T Mayasari (Indonesia) A C Pratiwi	17	11

Quarter-finals
6	(South Korea) Baek H-n (South Korea) Lee S-h	16	8^{r}
SWM	(Japan) A Igarashi (Japan) C Shida	21	10

=== Bottom half ===
==== Section 3 ====
First round
(France) M Lambert (France) C Pognante	16	21	21
(Malaysia) Ong X Y (Malaysia) C Ting	21	14	17
(Malaysia) Go P K (Malaysia) Teoh M X
8	(China) Li YJ (China) Luo XM	w	/	o
(India) K Selvam (India) S Singhi	21	21
(India) R Panda (India) S Panda	9	11
(Japan) K Osawa (Japan) M Tanabe	14	17
3	(South Korea) Kim H-j (South Korea) Kong H-y	21	21

Second round
(France) M Lambert (France) C Pognante	10	14
8	(China) Li YJ (China) Luo XM	21	21
(India) K Selvam (India) S Singhi	7	9
3	(South Korea) Kim H-j (South Korea) Kong H-y	21	21

Quarter-finals
8	(China) Li YJ (China) Luo XM	21	21
3	(South Korea) Kim H-j (South Korea) Kong H-y	15	14

==== Section 4 ====
First round
(Chinese Taipei) Hu L-f (Chinese Taipei) Jheng Y-c	15	10
(Japan) R Hirokami (Japan) S Hobara	21	21
(Scotland) J MacPherson (Scotland) C Torrance	14	17
5	(China) Chen QC (China) Jia YF	21	21
(Japan) N Hara (Japan) R Kiyose	11	22
(China) Bao LJ (China) Zhang SX	21	24
(Chinese Taipei) Hsu Y-h (Chinese Taipei) Lin J-y	16	24	12
2	(Malaysia) P Tan (Malaysia) Thinaah M	21	22	21

Second round
(Japan) R Hirokami (Japan) S Hobara	19	16
5	(China) Chen QC (China) Jia YF	21	21
(China) Bao LJ (China) Zhang SX	20	15
2	(Malaysia) P Tan (Malaysia) Thinaah M	22	21

Quarter-finals
5	(China) Chen QC (China) Jia YF	21	21
2	(Malaysia) P Tan (Malaysia) Thinaah M	16	16

== Mixed doubles ==
=== Seeds ===
1. (China) Jiang Zhenbang / Wei Yaxin (second round)
2. (China) Feng Yanzhe / Huang Dongping (champions)
3. (Thailand) Dechapol Puavaranukroh / Supissara Paewsampran (final)
4. (Malaysia) Chen Tang Jie / Toh Ee Wei (quarter-finals)
5. (France) Thom Gicquel / Delphine Delrue (quarter-finals)
6. (Hong Kong) Tang Chun Man / Tse Ying Suet (semi-finals)
7. (Japan) Hiroki Midorikawa / Natsu Saito (quarter-finals)
8. (Malaysia) Goh Soon Huat / Shevon Jemie Lai (quarter-finals)

=== Finals ===
Semi-finals
PFR	(Denmark) Mathias Christiansen (Denmark) Alexandra Bøje	16	21	14
3	(Thailand) Dechapol Puavaranukroh (Thailand) Supissara Paewsampran	21	14	21
6	(Hong Kong) Tang Chun Man (Hong Kong) Tse Ying Suet	22	17	16
2	(China) Feng Yanzhe (China) Huang Dongping	20	21	21

Final
3	(Thailand) Dechapol Puavaranukroh (Thailand) Supissara Paewsampran	25	12
2	(China) Feng Yanzhe (China) Huang Dongping	27	21

=== Top half ===
==== Section 1 ====
First round
1	(China) Jiang ZB (China) Wei YX	21	21
(France) J Maio (France) L Palermo	10	13
PFR	(Denmark) M Christiansen (Denmark) A Bøje	22	14	21
(Indonesia) A Maulana (Indonesia) I C S Jamil	20	21	15
5	(France) T Gicquel (France) D Delrue	19	21	21
(Thailand) R Oupthong (Thailand) J Sudjaipraparat	21	15	17
PFR	(Ukraine) O Titov (Ukraine) Y Kantemyr	12	19
(India) R Kapoor (India) R Gadde	21	21

Second round
1	(China) Jiang ZB (China) Wei YX	21	12	27
PFR	(Denmark) M Christiansen (Denmark) A Bøje	13	21	29
5	(France) T Gicquel (France) D Delrue	21	21	21
(India) R Kapoor (India) R Gadde	23	8	17

Quarter-finals
PFR	(Denmark) M Christiansen (Denmark) A Bøje	21	21
5	(France) T Gicquel (France) D Delrue	16	18

==== Section 2 ====
First round
3	(Thailand) D Puavaranukroh (Thailand) S Paewsampran	21	21
(Malaysia) Wong T C (Malaysia) Lim C S	17	17
(Indonesia) J Hidayatullah (Indonesia) F Pasaribu	21	21
(Denmark) M Vestergaard (Denmark) C Busch	7	14
7	(Japan) H Midorikawa (Japan) N Saito	21	21
(England) C Hemming (England) E van Leeuwen	15	18
(Thailand) P Horbanluekit (Thailand) B Aimsaard	15	12
(Germany) M Seidel (Germany) T P Nguyen	21	21

Second round
3	(Thailand) D Puavaranukroh (Thailand) S Paewsampran	21	21
(Indonesia) J Hidayatullah (Indonesia) F Pasaribu	19	17
7	(Japan) H Midorikawa (Japan) N Saito	21	21
(Germany) M Seidel (Germany) T P Nguyen	16	10

Quarter-finals
3	(Thailand) D Puavaranukroh (Thailand) S Paewsampran	21	21
7	(Japan) H Midorikawa (Japan) N Saito	16	15

=== Bottom half ===
==== Section 3 ====
First round
(Japan) Y Shimogami (Japan) S Hobara	14	21	23
(Denmark) J Toft (Denmark) A Magelund	21	15	21
(Chinese Taipei) Chen C-k (Chinese Taipei) Hsu Y-h	17	13
6	(Hong Kong) Tang C M (Hong Kong) Tse Y S	21	21
(Spain) R García (Spain) L Rodríguez	9	16
(Chinese Taipei) Ye H-w (Chinese Taipei) N G Chan	21	21
(Chinese Taipei) Yang P-h (Chinese Taipei) Hu L-f	21	16	12
4	(Malaysia) Chen T J (Malaysia) Toh E W	16	21	21

Second round
(Japan) Y Shimogami (Japan) S Hobara	23	10	14
6	(Hong Kong) Tang C M (Hong Kong) Tse Y S	21	21	21
(Chinese Taipei) Ye H-w (Chinese Taipei) N G Chan	20	21	20
4	(Malaysia) Chen T J (Malaysia) Toh E W	22	17	22

Quarter-finals
6	(Hong Kong) Tang C M (Hong Kong) Tse Y S	21	21
4	(Malaysia) Chen T J (Malaysia) Toh E W	9	18

==== Section 4 ====
First round
(Scotland) A Dunn (Scotland) J MacPherson	14	21	21
(South Korea) Lee J-m (South Korea) Chae Y-j	21	12	16
(Indonesia) A Syahnawi (Indonesia) N V Marwah	21	17	17
8	(Malaysia) Goh S H (Malaysia) S J Lai	15	21	21
(Brazil) F Farias (Brazil) J Lima	12	9
(Thailand) P Teeraratsakul (Thailand) S Taerattanachai	21	21
(China) Gao JX (China) Wu MY	11	11
2	(China) Feng YZ (China) Huang DP	21	21

Second round
(Scotland) A Dunn (Scotland) J MacPherson	13	10
8	(Malaysia) Goh S H (Malaysia) S J Lai	21	21
(Thailand) P Teeraratsakul (Thailand) S Taerattanachai	5	23	12
2	(China) Feng YZ (China) Huang DP	21	21	21

Quarter-finals
8	(Malaysia) Goh S H (Malaysia) S J Lai	18	16
2	(China) Feng YZ (China) Huang DP	21	21

Preceded by 2025 Denmark Open; 2025 Malaysia Super 100	BWF World Tour; 2025 BWF season	Succeeded by 2025 Hylo Open
