= 2018 European Junior Badminton Championships – Boys' singles =

2018 European Junior Badminton Championships – Boys' Singles
Tournament details
- Dates: 11 – 16 September 2018
- Edition: 26
- Venue: Kalev Sports Hall
- Location: Tallinn, Estonia

The Boys' Singles tournament of the 2018 European Junior Badminton Championships was held from September 11-16. Toma Junior Popov from France clinched this title in the last edition.

== Seeded ==
1. (Republic of Ireland) Nhat Nguyen (semi-finals)
2. (France) Arnaud Merklé (champions)
3. (France) Christo Popov (finals)
4. (Scotland) Chris Grimley (third round)
5. (Moldova) Cristian Savin (quarter-finals)
6. (England) Zach Russ (quarter-finals)
7. (Belgium) Julien Carraggi (quarter-finals)
8. (Germany) Lukas Resch (semi-finals)
9. (Netherlands) Dennis Koppen (fourth round)
10. (Ukraine) Danylo Bosniuk (fourth round)
11. (Italy) Giovanni Toti (third round)
12. (Norway) Markus Barth (fourth round)
13. (Spain) Tomás Toledano (fourth round)
14. (Russia) Georgii Karpov (quarter-finals)
15. (Italy) Enrico Baroni (second round)
16. (Germany) Brian Holtschke (third round)'

== Draw ==
=== Finals ===
Quarterfinals
1 | (Republic of Ireland) Nhat Nguyen | 21 | 21
5 | (Moldova) Cristian Savin | 17 | 13
3 | (France) Christo Popov | 21 | 21
7 | (Belgium) Julien Carraggi | 16 | 15
8 | (Germany) Lukas Resch | 11 | 21 | 21
14 | (Russia) Georgii Karpov | 21 | 17 | 18
6 | (England) Zach Russ | 13 | 6
2 | (France) Arnaud Merklé | 21 | 21

Semifinals
1 | (Republic of Ireland) Nhat Nguyen | 7 | 21 | 18
3 | (France) Christo Popov | 21 | 16 | 21
8 | (Germany) Lukas Resch | 14 | 14
2 | (France) Arnaud Merklé | 21 | 21

Final
3 | (France) Christo Popov | 7 | 14
2 | (France) Arnaud Merklé | 21 | 21

=== Top half ===
==== Section 1 ====
First round
(Scotland) J Apiliga | 21 | 21
(Israel) M Grinblat | 10 | 10

Second round
1 | (Republic of Ireland) N Nguyen | 21 | 21
(Bulgaria) S Zlankov | 5 | 4
(Romania) D Popescu | 21 | 18 | 21
(Hungary) Z Dulcz | 17 | 21 | 18
10 | (Ukraine) D Bosniuk | 21 | 21
(Germany) M Kicklitz | 17 | 15
(Czech Republic) J Kral | 21 | 10 | 13
(Scotland) J Apiliga | 16 | 21 | 21

Third round
1 | (Republic of Ireland) N Nguyen | 21 | 21
(Romania) D Popescu | 9 | 6
10 | (Ukraine) D Bosniuk | 21 | 21
(Scotland) J Apiliga | 18 | 6

Fourth round
1 | (Republic of Ireland) N Nguyen | 21 | 21
10 | (Ukraine) D Bosniuk | 11 | 13

==== Section 2 ====
First round
(Denmark) M Sorensen | 21 | 21
(Azerbaijan) S Huseynov | 8 | 13
(Russia) A Khamidulin | 21 | 21
(Iceland) E Hognason | 10 | 15

Second round
5 | (Moldova) C Savin | 21 | 21
(Slovenia) K Lesnicar | 18 | 10
(Cyprus) S Hadjipantelis | 6 | 10
(Denmark) M Sorensen | 21 | 21
15 | (Italy) E Baroni | 16 | 17
(Sweden) C Hammarberg | 21 | 21
(Switzerland) N Mueller | 21 | 21
(Russia) A Khamidulin | 13 | 14

Third round
5 | (Moldova) C Savin | 21 | 18 | 21
(Denmark) M Sorensen | 15 | 21 | 14
(Sweden) C Hammarberg | 14 | 16
(Switzerland) N Mueller | 21 | 21

Fourth round
5 | (Moldova) C Savin | 21 | 21
(Switzerland) N Mueller | 11 | 11

==== Section 3 ====
First round
(Austria) N Rudolf | 13 | 11
(Estonia) K Kert | 21 | 21

Second round
3 | (France) C Popov | 21 | 21
(Russia) G Lebedev | 19 | 13
(Netherlands) F Achthoven | 21 | 21
(Norway) L Smith-Meyer | 16 | 17
16 | (Germany) B Holtschke | 21 | 21
(Portugal) R Tremoceiro | 12 | 15
(Slovakia) J Horak | 17 | 20
(Estonia) K Kert | 21 | 22

Third round
3 | (France) C Popov | 21 | 21
(Netherlands) F Achthoven | 6 | 12
16 | (Germany) B Holtschke | 17 | 22
(Estonia) K Kert | 21 | 24

Fourth round
3 | (France) C Popov | 21 | 21
(Estonia) K Kert | 10 | 10

==== Section 4 ====
First round
(Poland) A Niczyporuk | 8 | 2
(England) H Huang | 21 | 21
(Turkey) S Kelebek | 21 | 21
(Croatia) J Meglic | 14 | 16

Second round
7 | (Belgium) J Carraggi | 21 | 21
(Poland) P Kordek | 3 | 14
(Lithuania) J Petkus | 8 | 8
(England) H Huang | 21 | 21
13 | (Spain) T Toledano | 21 | 21
(Finland) J Oldorff | 19 | 16
(Latvia) A D Bedritis | 16 | 6
(Turkey) S Kelebek | 21 | 21

Third round
7 | (Belgium) J Carraggi | 21 | 19 | 21
(England) H Huang | 14 | 21 | 16
13 | (Spain) T Toledano | 24 | 21
(Turkey) S Kelebek | 22 | 11

Fourth round
7 | (Belgium) J Carraggi | 21 | 21
13 | (Spain) T Toledano | 16 | 8

=== Bottom half ===
==== Section 5 ====
First round
(Spain) M San Luis | 12 | 21 | 21
(Estonia) H-K Pilve | 21 | 14 | 19
(Turkey) H Simsek | 21 | 21 | 21
(Belgium) S Houthoofd | 14 | 23 | 14

Second round
(Spain) M San Luis | 15 | 9
(Denmark) M Johannesen | 21 | 21
(Slovakia) A Antoska | 21 | 18 | 19
11 | (Italy) G Toti | 9 | 21 | 21
(Turkey) H Simsek | 17 | 17
(Hungary) B Papai | 21 | 21
(Austria) K Meusburger | 19 | 8
8 | (Germany) L Resch | 21 | 21

Third round
(Denmark) M Johannesen | 21 | 21
11 | (Italy) G Toti | 16 | 10
(Hungary) B Papai | 8 | 7
8 | (Germany) L Resch | 21 | 21

Fourth round
(Denmark) M Johannesen | 13 | 14
8 | (Germany) L Resch | 21 | 21

==== Section 6 ====
First round
(Bulgaria) I Stoynov | 21 | 21
(Poland) M Matysiak | 11 | 12
(Sweden) J Azelius | 21 | 21
(Cyprus) A Kattirtzi | 10 | 10

Second round
(Bulgaria) I Stoynov | 21 | 21
(Iceland) B M Ellertsson | 6 | 4
(Israel) M Bar Netzer | 11 | 12
14 | (Russia) G Karpov | 21 | 21
(Sweden) J Azelius | 21 | 21
(Ukraine) I Medynskiy | 14 | 5
(France) Y Gaudin | wo
4 | (Scotland) C Grimley

Third round
(Bulgaria) I Stoynov | 18 | 11
14 | (Russia) G Karpov | 21 | 21
(Sweden) J Azelius | 21 | 18 | 21
4 | (Scotland) C Grimley | 18 | 21 | 12

Fourth round
14 | (Russia) G Karpov | 21 | 21
(Sweden) J Azelius | 15 | 17

==== Section 7 ====
First round
(Estonia) A Ajupov | 19 | 8
(Switzerland) Y Orteu | 21 | 21
(Denmark) N Wolf | 21 | 21
(Moldova) P Cunev | 14 | 10

Second round
(Switzerland) Y Orteu | 21 | 21
(Romania) M Craciun | 18 | 16
(Czech Republic) J Viktora | 18 | 18
12 | (Norway) M Barth | 21 | 21
(Denmark) N Wolf | 22 | 21
(Republic of Ireland) A McAllister | 20 | 17
(Portugal) J Chang | 6 | 9
6 | (England) Z Russ | 21 | 21

Third round
(Switzerland) Y Orteu | 17 | 12
12 | (Norway) M Barth | 21 | 21
(Denmark) N Wolf | 11 | 21 | 16
6 | (England) Z Russ | 21 | 17 | 21

Fourth round
12 | (Norway) M Barth | 18 | 16
6 | (England) Z Russ | 21 | 21

==== Section 8 ====
First round
(Lithuania) D Berzanskis | 21 | 21
(Latvia) E Vaivads | 6 | 11

Second round
(Lithuania) D Berzanskis | 11 | 13
(Slovenia) I Spiller | 21 | 21
(Croatia) L Ban | 8 | 21 | 20
9 | (Netherlands) D Koppen | 21 | 17 | 22
(Finland) E Lauri | 21 | 21
(Belarus) I Larushyn | 15 | 7
(Czech Republic) J Janostik | 12 | 13
2 | (France) A Merklé | 21 | 21

Third round
(Slovenia) I Spiller | 12 | 11
9 | (Netherlands) D Koppen | 21 | 21
(Finland) E Lauri | 16 | 9
2 | (France) A Merklé | 21 | 21

Fourth round
9 | (Netherlands) D Koppen | 10 | 13
2 | (France) A Merklé | 21 | 21
