= 2026 European Badminton Championships =

Badminton tournament in Europe

Tournament details
- Dates: 6–12 April
- Edition: 32nd
- Venue: Palacio de los Deportes Carolina Marín
- Location: Huelva, Spain

Champions
- Men's singles: (France) Christo Popov
- Women's singles: (Scotland) Kirsty Gilmour
- Men's doubles: (England) Ben Lane (England) Sean Vendy
- Women's doubles: (Bulgaria) Gabriela Stoeva (Bulgaria) Stefani Stoeva
- Mixed doubles: (Denmark) Mathias Christiansen (Denmark) Alexandra Bøje

The 2026 European Badminton Championships was the 32nd edition of the European Badminton Championships. It was held in Palacio de los Deportes Carolina Marín, Huelva, Spain, from 6 to 12 April 2026.

== Tournament ==
The 2026 European Badminton Championships was the 32nd edition of the European Badminton Championships. This tournament is organized by Badminton Europe and hosted by the Spanish Badminton Federation.

=== Venue ===
This tournament was held at the Palacio de los Deportes Carolina Marín in Huelva, Spain.

=== Point distribution ===
Below is the point distribution table for each phase of the tournament based on the BWF points system for the European Badminton Championships, which is equivalent to a Super 500 event.

Winner	Runner-up	3/4	5/8	9/16	17/32	33/64
9,200	7,800	6,420	5,040	3,600	2,220	880

== Medal table ==
* Host nation (Spain)

Rank	Nation	Gold	Silver	Bronze	Total
1	Denmark	1	2	4	7
2	France	1	1	2	4
3	England	1	1	1	3
4	Bulgaria	1	0	0	1
4	Scotland	1	0	0	1
6	Turkey	0	1	1	2
7	Germany	0	0	1	1
7	Ukraine	0	0	1	1
Totals (8 entries)		5	5	10	20

== Medal summary ==
Event	Gold	Silver	Bronze
Men's singles	Christo Popov; France	Anders Antonsen; Denmark	Arnaud Merklé; France Toma Junior Popov; France
Women's singles	Kirsty Gilmour; Scotland	Line Kjærsfeldt; Denmark	Mia Blichfeldt; Denmark Neslihan Arın; Turkey
Men's doubles	England; Ben Lane; Sean Vendy	France; Christo Popov; Toma Junior Popov	England; Alex Green; Zach Russ Denmark; Daniel Lundgaard; Mads Vestergaard
Women's doubles	Bulgaria; Gabriela Stoeva; Stefani Stoeva	Turkey; Bengisu Erçetin; Nazlıcan İnci	Ukraine; Polina Buhrova; Yevheniia Kantemyr Denmark; Kathrine Vang; Mette Werge
Mixed doubles	Denmark; Mathias Christiansen; Alexandra Bøje	England; Callum Hemming; Estelle van Leeuwen	Denmark; Jesper Toft; Amalie Magelund Germany; Marvin Seidel; Thuc Phuong Nguyen

== Men's singles ==
=== Seeds ===
1. (Denmark) Anders Antonsen (final)
2. (France) Christo Popov (champion)
3. (France) Alex Lanier (quarter-finals)
4. (France) Toma Junior Popov (semi-finals)
5. (Denmark) Rasmus Gemke (quarter-finals)
6. (Republic of Ireland) Nhat Nguyen (quarter-finals)
7. (France) Arnaud Merklé (semi-finals)
8. (Denmark) Magnus Johannesen (third round)

=== Finals ===
Semi-finals
1	(Denmark) Anders Antonsen	21	21
7	(France) Arnaud Merklé	18	13
4	(France) Toma Junior Popov	18	25
2	(France) Christo Popov	21	27

Final
1	(Denmark) Anders Antonsen	12	19
2	(France) Christo Popov	21	21

=== Top half ===
==== Section 1 ====
First round
(Switzerland) T Künzi	21	21
(Portugal) B Carvalho	12	9
(Israel) M Zilberman	14	21	15
(Italy) F Caponio	21	18	21

Second round
1	(Denmark) A Antonsen	21	21
(Ukraine) O Titov	14	6
(Slovakia) M Dratva	17	21	19
(Switzerland) T Künzi	21	10	21
6	(Republic of Ireland) N Nguyen	21	22
(Azerbaijan) A R Dwicahyo	8	20
(Finland) K Koljonen	21	22
(Italy) F Caponio	18	20

Third round
1	(Denmark) A Antonsen	21	21
(Switzerland) T Künzi	12	11
6	(Republic of Ireland) N Nguyen	21	21
(Finland) K Koljonen	19	13

Quarter-finals
1	(Denmark) A Antonsen	11
6	(Republic of Ireland) N Nguyen	6^{r}

==== Section 2 ====
First round
(Germany) M Kicklitz
(Malta) M Abela	w	/	o
(Poland) M Szymanowski	19	13
(Spain) Á Leal	21	21

Second round
3	(France) A Lanier	21	21
(Sweden) G Bjorkler	15	16
(Croatia) A Dinata	21	21
(Malta) M Abela	15	13
7	(France) A Merklé	21	21
(Norway) M Barth	9	17
(England) H Huang	21	21
(Spain) Á Leal	10	14

Third round
3	(France) A Lanier	21	21
(Croatia) A Dinata	18	16
7	(France) A Merklé	20	21	21
(England) H Huang	22	14	13

Quarter-finals
3	(France) A Lanier	21	19	18
7	(France) A Merklé	17	21	21

=== Bottom half ===
==== Section 3 ====
First round
(Scotland) C Smith	21	21
(Finland) J Oldorff	13	9
(Poland) D Kwinta	21	21
(Netherlands) N Haase	12	13

Second round
(Scotland) C Smith	12	13
(Belgium) J Carraggi	21	21
(Luxembourg) J Pauquet	13	10
8	(Denmark) M Johannesen	21	21
(Poland) D Kwinta	21	16	21
(Switzerland) J Scheiwiller	17	21	18
(Germany) Oei K-y	12	11
4	(France) T J Popov	21	21

Third round
(Belgium) J Carraggi	21	14	21
8	(Denmark) M Johannesen	17	21	16
(Poland) D Kwinta	18	15
4	(France) T J Popov	21	21

Quarter-finals
(Belgium) J Carraggi	8	11
4	(France) T J Popov	21	21

==== Section 4 ====
First round
(Azerbaijan) D D Pangestu	19	21	21
(Bulgaria) D Yanakiev	21	16	14
(England) C Kayan	10	21	17
(Italy) G Toti	21	14	21

Second round
(Azerbaijan) D D Pangestu	15	19
(Austria) C V Filimon	21	21
(Spain) P Abián	10	9
5	(Denmark) R Gemke	21	21
(Italy) G Toti	12	13
(Israel) D Dubovenko	21	21
(Czech Republic) D Kopřiva	5	16
2	(France) C Popov	21	21

Third round
(Austria) C V Filimon	12	11
5	(Denmark) R Gemke	21	21
(Israel) D Dubovenko	9	19
2	(France) C Popov	21	21

Quarter-finals
5	(Denmark) R Gemke	23	15
2	(France) C Popov	25	21

== Women's singles ==
=== Seeds ===
1. (Denmark) Line Kjærsfeldt (final)
2. (Denmark) Line Christophersen (quarter-finals)
3. (Denmark) Mia Blichfeldt (semi-finals)
4. (Turkey) Neslihan Arın (semi-finals)
5. (Scotland) Kirsty Gilmour (champion)
6. (Ukraine) Polina Buhrova (quarter-finals)
7. (Denmark) Amalie Schulz (quarter-finals)
8. (Germany) Yvonne Li (quarter-finals)

=== Finals ===
Semi-finals
1	(Denmark) Line Kjærsfeldt	21	22
3	(Denmark) Mia Blichfeldt	16	20
4	(Turkey) Neslihan Arın	21	14	11
5	(Scotland) Kirsty Gilmour	16	21	21

Final
1	(Denmark) Line Kjærsfeldt	17	15
5	(Scotland) Kirsty Gilmour	21	21

=== Top half ===
==== Section 1 ====
First round
(Czech Republic) P Maixnerová	19	15
(Bulgaria) K Nalbantova	21	21
(Germany) M Wilson	21	21
(France) R O Pancasari	18	8

Second round
1	(Denmark) L Kjærsfeldt	21	21
(Azerbaijan) K F Azzahra	11	12
(Scotland) R Sugden	15	11
(Bulgaria) K Nalbantova	21	21
7	(Denmark) A Schulz	21	21
(Lithuania) V Paulauskaite	15	19
(Poland) W Górniak	14	16
(Germany) M Wilson	21	21

Third round
1	(Denmark) L Kjærsfeldt	19	21	21
(Bulgaria) K Nalbantova	21	17	16
7	(Denmark) A Schulz	21	21
(Germany) M Wilson	16	19

Quarter-finals
1	(Denmark) L Kjærsfeldt	21	9	21
7	(Denmark) A Schulz	17	21	13

==== Section 2 ====
First round
(Sweden) C Wang	8	15
(Hungary) V Sándorházi	21	21
(Switzerland) D Pelupessy	15	13
(Spain) C Azurmendi	21	21

Second round
3	(Denmark) M Blichfeldt	w	/	o
(Israel) H Neiman
(Portugal) M Paiva	9	8
(Hungary) V Sándorházi	21	21
6	(Ukraine) P Buhrova	21	21
(Italy) G Stiglich	12	10
(Turkey) Ö Bayrak	21	17	21
(Spain) C Azurmendi	18	21	19

Third round
3	(Denmark) M Blichfeldt	21	21
(Hungary) V Sándorházi	17	13
6	(Ukraine) P Buhrova	21	21
(Turkey) Ö Bayrak	14	9

Quarter-finals
3	(Denmark) M Blichfeldt	22	21
6	(Ukraine) P Buhrova	20	17

=== Bottom half ===
==== Section 3 ====
First round
(Finland) P Saarnivaara	27	21	21
(Slovakia) N Slobodová	29	15	13
(Italy) Y Hamza	21	21
(Slovenia) A Blazina	10	10

Second round
(Finland) P Saarnivaara	22	17	17
(France) A Tatranova	20	21	21
(Czech Republic) T Švábíková	7	14
8	(Germany) Y Li	21	21
(Italy) Y Hamza	9	19
(Ukraine) Y Kantemyr	21	21
(Belgium) C Lassaux	12	4
4	(Turkey) N Arın	21	21

Third round
(France) A Tatranova	15	18
8	(Germany) Y Li	21	21
(Ukraine) Y Kantemyr	10	12
4	(Turkey) N Arın	21	21

Quarter-finals
8	(Germany) Y Li	16	17
4	(Turkey) N Arın	21	21

==== Section 4 ====
First round
(Bulgaria) S Stoeva	21	21
(England) L Lee	14	19
(Croatia) J Buchberger	21	16	10
(Switzerland) M Schnider	16	21	21

Second round
(Bulgaria) S Stoeva	21	27
(Republic of Ireland) S Noble	18	25
(Hungary) Á Kőrösi	18	19
5	(Scotland) K Gilmour	21	21
(Switzerland) M Schnider	w	/	o
(Spain) C Marín
(Estonia) K Kuuba	11	13
2	(Denmark) L Christophersen	21	21

Third round
(Bulgaria) S Stoeva	12	8
5	(Scotland) K Gilmour	21	21
(Switzerland) M Schnider	9	14
2	(Denmark) L Christophersen	21	21

Quarter-finals
5	(Scotland) K Gilmour	21	14	24
2	(Denmark) L Christophersen	15	21	22

== Men's doubles ==
=== Seeds ===
1. (Denmark) Kim Astrup / Anders Skaarup Rasmussen (quarter-finals)
2. (England) Ben Lane / Sean Vendy (champions)
3. (France) Christo Popov / Toma Junior Popov (final)
4. (Denmark) Daniel Lundgaard / Mads Vestergaard (semi-finals)
5. (France) Éloi Adam / Léo Rossi (first round)
6. (France) Maël Cattoen / Lucas Renoir (first round)
7. (Czech Republic) Jiří Král / Ondřej Král (quarter-finals)
8. (Scotland) Christopher Grimley / Matthew Grimley (quarter-finals)

=== Finals ===
Semi-finals
(England) Alex Green (England) Zach Russ	9	14
3	(France) Christo Popov (France) Toma Junior Popov	21	21
4	(Denmark) Daniel Lundgaard (Denmark) Mads Vestergaard	19	17
2	(England) Ben Lane (England) Sean Vendy	21	21

Final
3	(France) Christo Popov (France) Toma Junior Popov	15	16
2	(England) Ben Lane (England) Sean Vendy	21	21

=== Top half ===
==== Section 1 ====
First round
(Bulgaria) I Rusev (Bulgaria) I Stoynov	20	21	11
(Spain) J Fernández (Spain) A Perals	22	11	21
6	(France) M Cattoen (France) L Renoir	20	14
(England) A Green (England) Z Russ	22	21
(Germany) M Bourakkadi (Germany) K Neumann	20	10
(England) O Butler (England) S Jones	22	21

Second round
1	(Denmark) K Astrup (Denmark) A S Rasmussen	21	21
(Spain) J Fernández (Spain) A Perals	16	14
(England) A Green (England) Z Russ	21	21
(England) O Butler (England) S Jones	15	13

Quarter-finals
1	(Denmark) K Astrup (Denmark) A S Rasmussen	21	15	17
(England) A Green (England) Z Russ	9	21	21

==== Section 2 ====
First round
(Sweden) M Molin (Sweden) M Svensson	21	23
(Poland) A Krawczyk (Poland) S Slepecki	15	21
7	(Czech Republic) J Král (Czech Republic) O Král	21	21
(Belgium) I van Delsen (Belgium) Y van Delsen	12	10
(Germany) J Dresp (Germany) S Krax	21	8	21
(Scotland) A Dunn (Scotland) A Pringle	18	21	17

Second round
3	(France) C Popov (France) T J Popov	21	21
(Sweden) M Molin (Sweden) M Svensson	16	13
7	(Czech Republic) J Král (Czech Republic) O Král	19	25	21
(Germany) J Dresp (Germany) S Krax	21	23	11

Quarter-finals
3	(France) C Popov (France) T J Popov	21	21
7	(Czech Republic) J Král (Czech Republic) O Král	15	14

=== Bottom half ===
==== Section 3 ====
First round
(Hungary) C Horváth (Hungary) M Kis-Kasza	22	21
(Republic of Ireland) S Guildea (Republic of Ireland) P Reynolds	20	13
(Germany) B Geiss (Germany) J R Jansen	21	10	21
5	(France) É Adam (France) L Rossi	18	21	16
(Spain) R García (Spain) C Piris	21	21
(Iceland) D B Björnsson (Iceland) K D Finnsson	12	11

Second round
(Hungary) C Horváth (Hungary) M Kis-Kasza	13	9
(Germany) B Geiss (Germany) J R Jansen	21	21
(Spain) R García (Spain) C Piris	12	10
4	(Denmark) D Lundgaard (Denmark) M Vestergaard	21	21

Quarter-finals
(Germany) B Geiss (Germany) J R Jansen	19	20
4	(Denmark) D Lundgaard (Denmark) M Vestergaard	21	22

==== Section 4 ====
First round
(Denmark) C F Kjær (Denmark) R Kjær	21	21
(Norway) T Flåtten (Norway) J Østhassel	13	17
(Czech Republic) V Havlíček (Czech Republic) T Švejda	11	9
8	(Scotland) C Grimley (Scotland) M Grimley	21	21
(Switzerland) Y Orteu (Switzerland) M Q Pham	19	21	21
(Turkey) B Aktaş (Turkey) E Sönmez	21	19	15

Second round
(Denmark) C F Kjær (Denmark) R Kjær	17	13
8	(Scotland) C Grimley (Scotland) M Grimley	21	21
(Switzerland) Y Orteu (Switzerland) M Q Pham	10	13
2	(England) B Lane (England) S Vendy	21	21

Quarter-finals
8	(Scotland) C Grimley (Scotland) M Grimley	8	15
2	(England) B Lane (England) S Vendy	21	21

== Women's doubles ==
=== Seeds ===
1. (Bulgaria) Gabriela Stoeva / Stefani Stoeva (champions)
2. (France) Margot Lambert / Camille Pognante (second round)
3. (Ukraine) Polina Buhrova / Yevheniia Kantemyr (semi-finals)
4. (Turkey) Bengisu Erçetin / Nazlıcan İnci (final)
5. (Scotland) Julie MacPherson / Ciara Torrance (quarter-finals)
6. (Poland) Paulina Cybulska / Kornelia Marczak (first round)
7. (England) Abbygael Harris / Lizzie Tolman (quarter-finals)
8. (Switzerland) Lucie Amiguet / Caroline Racloz (first round)

=== Finals ===
Semi-finals
1	(Bulgaria) Gabriela Stoeva (Bulgaria) Stefani Stoeva	21	21
3	(Ukraine) Polina Buhrova (Ukraine) Yevheniia Kantemyr	12	3
4	(Turkey) Bengisu Erçetin (Turkey) Nazlıcan İnci	21	21
(Denmark) Kathrine Vang (Denmark) Mette Werge	17	10

Final
1	(Bulgaria) Gabriela Stoeva (Bulgaria) Stefani Stoeva	21	21
4	(Turkey) Bengisu Erçetin (Turkey) Nazlıcan İnci	11	17

=== Top half ===
==== Section 1 ====
First round
(Spain) N Carulla (Spain) C M Jiménez	12	16
(Netherlands) D Jille (Germany) I Lohau	21	21
5	(Scotland) J MacPherson (Scotland) C Torrance	w	/	o
(Germany) S Hübsch (Germany) A Lehmann
(Denmark) S Pilgaard (Denmark) S Schulz	21	21
(Austria) S Dlapka (Austria) L Rumpold	12	13

Second round
1	(Bulgaria) G Stoeva (Bulgaria) S Stoeva	21	21
(Netherlands) D Jille (Germany) I Lohau	13	14
5	(Scotland) J MacPherson (Scotland) C Torrance	21	21
(Denmark) S Pilgaard (Denmark) S Schulz	15	14

Quarter-finals
1	(Bulgaria) G Stoeva (Bulgaria) S Stoeva	21	21
5	(Scotland) J MacPherson (Scotland) C Torrance	13	7

==== Section 2 ====
First round
(Netherlands) K de Wit (Netherlands) M Loos	21	16	21
(Sweden) M Norrman (Sweden) T Sjöö	10	21	17
7	(England) A Harris (England) L Tolman	21	21
(Slovenia) A Jordan (Slovenia) K Matovič	12	7
(France) E Jacob (France) F Vallet	14	21	18
(Turkey) Y Bektaş (Turkey) S Yıldız	21	19	21

Second round
3	(Ukraine) P Buhrova (Ukraine) Y Kantemyr	21	21
(Netherlands) K de Wit (Netherlands) M Loos	10	17
7	(England) A Harris (England) L Tolman	21	21
(Turkey) Y Bektaş (Turkey) S Yıldız	11	19

Quarter-finals
3	(Ukraine) P Buhrova (Ukraine) Y Kantemyr	21	21
7	(England) A Harris (England) L Tolman	19	17

=== Bottom half ===
==== Section 3 ====
First round
(Italy) M Corsini (Italy) E Piccinin	12	21	19
(England) L Curtin (England) S Kelly	21	18	21
(Spain) P López (Spain) L Rodríguez	18	21	21
6	(Poland) P Cybulska (Poland) K Marczak	21	19	19
(Sweden) F Hallberg (Sweden) E Öhling	21	21
(Bulgaria) M Chepisheva (Bulgaria) T Popivanova	16	13

Second round
(England) L Curtin (England) S Kelly	21	16	21
(Spain) P López (Spain) L Rodríguez	17	21	16
(Sweden) F Hallberg (Sweden) E Öhling	18	9
4	(Turkey) B Erçetin (Turkey) N İnci	21	21

Quarter-finals
(England) L Curtin (England) S Kelly	13	13
4	(Turkey) B Erçetin (Turkey) N İnci	21	21

==== Section 4 ====
First round
(Austria) S Au Yeong (Austria) A Hagspiel	17	21	19
(Ukraine) R Almalalha (Ukraine) S Lavrova	21	12	21
(Denmark) K Vang (Denmark) M Werge	w	/	o
8	(Switzerland) L Amiguet (Switzerland) C Racloz
(Denmark) L Hvid (Denmark) A Klausholm	21	21
(Switzerland) A Müller (Netherlands) K van Buiten	12	16

Second round
(Ukraine) R Almalalha (Ukraine) S Lavrova	7	8
(Denmark) K Vang (Denmark) M Werge	21	21
(Denmark) L Hvid (Denmark) A Klausholm	21	22
2	(France) M Lambert (France) C Pognante	10	20

Quarter-finals
(Denmark) K Vang (Denmark) M Werge	21	21
(Denmark) L Hvid (Denmark) A Klausholm	12	10

== Mixed doubles ==
=== Seeds ===
1. (France) Thom Gicquel / Delphine Delrue (second round)
2. (Denmark) Mathias Christiansen / Alexandra Bøje (champions)
3. (Denmark) Jesper Toft / Amalie Magelund (semi-finals)
4. (Denmark) Mads Vestergaard / Christine Busch (quarter-finals)
5. (Germany) Marvin Seidel / Thuc Phuong Nguyen (semi-finals)
6. (Denmark) Rasmus Espersen / Amalie Cecilie Kudsk (quarter-finals)
7. (Scotland) Alexander Dunn / Julie MacPherson (first round)
8. (France) Julien Maio / Léa Palermo (quarter-finals)

=== Finals ===
Semi-finals
(England) Callum Hemming (England) Estelle van Leeuwen	23	21
3	(Denmark) Jesper Toft (Denmark) Amalie Magelund	21	16
5	(Germany) Marvin Seidel (Germany) Thuc Phuong Nguyen	12	16
2	(Denmark) Mathias Christiansen (Denmark) Alexandra Bøje	21	21

Final
(England) Callum Hemming (England) Estelle van Leeuwen	19	14
2	(Denmark) Mathias Christiansen (Denmark) Alexandra Bøje	21	21

=== Top half ===
==== Section 1 ====
First round
(Sweden) M Svensson (Sweden) S Strömvall	15	9
(England) C Hemming (England) E van Leeuwen	21	21
7	(Scotland) A Dunn (Scotland) J MacPherson	21	19	20
(Germany) S Krax (Germany) A Lehmann	15	21	22
(Netherlands) B Wassink (Netherlands) D Jille	w	/	o
(Switzerland) Y Orteu (Switzerland) C Racloz

Second round
1	(France) T Gicquel (France) D Delrue	17	21	20
(England) C Hemming (England) E van Leeuwen	21	18	22
(Germany) S Krax (Germany) A Lehmann	13	16
(Netherlands) B Wassink (Netherlands) D Jille	21	21

Quarter-finals
(England) C Hemming (England) E van Leeuwen	21	21
(Netherlands) B Wassink (Netherlands) D Jille	11	13

==== Section 2 ====
First round
(Germany) M Bourakkadi (Germany) L Michalski	21	21
(Spain) R Sanjurjo (Spain) N Carulla	17	10
6	(Denmark) R Espersen (Denmark) A C Kudsk	21	21
(Estonia) M Õunmaa (Estonia) R Üprus	8	19
(Czech Republic) O Král (Czech Republic) T Švábíková	21	21
(Republic of Ireland) J Magee (Republic of Ireland) M Ryan	15	17

Second round
3	(Denmark) J Toft (Denmark) A Magelund	21	21
(Germany) M Bourakkadi (Germany) L Michalski	16	15
6	(Denmark) R Espersen (Denmark) A C Kudsk	21	21
(Czech Republic) O Král (Czech Republic) T Švábíková	12	11

Quarter-finals
3	(Denmark) J Toft (Denmark) A Magelund	21	21
6	(Denmark) R Espersen (Denmark) A C Kudsk	14	15

=== Bottom half ===
==== Section 3 ====
First round
(Serbia) M Tomić (Serbia) A Vitman	21	21
(Ukraine) O Titov (Ukraine) Y Kantemyr	4	16
(Bulgaria) E Panev (Bulgaria) G Stoeva	8	13
5	(Germany) M Seidel (Germany) T P Nguyen	21	21
(Hungary) M Kis-Kasza (Hungary) V Sándorházi	17	23
(Switzerland) N Franconville (Switzerland) J Franconville	21	25

Second round
(Serbia) M Tomić (Serbia) A Vitman	24	13
5	(Germany) M Seidel (Germany) T P Nguyen	26	21
(Switzerland) N Franconville (Switzerland) J Franconville	17	15
4	(Denmark) M Vestergaard (Denmark) C Busch	21	21

Quarter-finals
5	(Germany) M Seidel (Germany) T P Nguyen	21	21
4	(Denmark) M Vestergaard (Denmark) C Busch	18	13

==== Section 4 ====
First round
(Sweden) F Karlborg (Sweden) T Sjöö	10	18
(England) S Jones (England) L Tolman	21	21
(Turkey) E Sönmez (Turkey) Y Bektaş	17	18
8	(France) J Maio (France) L Palermo	21	21
(Netherlands) A Buijk (Netherlands) M Loos	14	14
(Spain) R García (Spain) L Rodríguez	21	21

Second round
(England) S Jones (England) L Tolman	21	15	13
8	(France) J Maio (France) L Palermo	19	21	21
(Spain) R García (Spain) L Rodríguez	16	17
2	(Denmark) M Christiansen (Denmark) A Bøje	21	21

Quarter-finals
8	(France) J Maio (France) L Palermo	10	18
2	(Denmark) M Christiansen (Denmark) A Bøje	21	21
