= European U15 Badminton Championships =

The European U15 Badminton Championships is a tournament organized by the Badminton Europe (BE) since 2014 and is held once every two years to crown the best junior badminton players in Europe. The tournament is usually held alongside the European Men's and Women's Team Badminton Championships.

== Championships ==
Year	Number	Host city	Host Country	Events
2014	1	Basel	Switzerland	5
2016	2	Kazan	Russia	5
2018	3	Kazan	Russia	5
2020	4	Liévin	France	5
2022	5	Ibiza	Spain	5
2024	6	Suwałki	Poland	5
2026	7	Straume	Norway	5

== Past medalists ==
Year	Event	Gold	Silver	Bronze	
2014
2014	MS	(Denmark) Jesper Toft	(Serbia) Luka Milić	(Czech Republic) Petr Beran	(France) Thom Gicquel
2014	WS	(Denmark) Alexandra Bøje	(Ukraine) Maryna Ilyinskaya	(Turkey) Yaren Dolcu	(Turkey) Busra Unlu
2014	MD	(Denmark) Paw Eriksen (Denmark) Mads Thøgersen	(England) Callum Hemming (England) Johnnie Torjussen	(France) Eloi Adam (France) Arnaud Merklé	(Czech Republic) Petr Beran (Czech Republic) Jan Louda
2014	WD	(Netherlands) Marlies Baan (Netherlands) Ella Peters	(England) Fee Teng Liew (England) Lizzie Tolman	(Denmark) Sofie Nielsen (Denmark) Michelle Skodstrup	(Germany) Runa Plützer (Germany) Annika Schreiber
2014	XD	(Denmark) Jesper Toft (Denmark) Alexandra Boje	(Ukraine) Danilo Bosniuk (Ukraine) Maryna Ilyinskaya	(Russia) Mikhail Lavrikov (Russia) Anastasia Medvedeva	(Denmark) Paw Eriksen (Denmark) Michelle Skodsrup
2016
2016	MS	(England) Harry Huang	(France) Christo Popov	(Russia) Georgii Karpov	(England) Rory Easton
2016	WS	(Denmark) Mathilde Cramer Ahrens	(Hungary) Vivien Sándorházi	(Russia) Anastasiia Kurdyukova	(Turkey) Bengisu Erçetin
2016	MD	(France) Kenji Lovang (France) Christo Popov	(England) Rory Easton (England) Harry Huang	(Denmark) Rasmus Espersen (Denmark) Sebastian Grønbjerg	(Scotland) Joshua Apiliga (Scotland) Adam Pringle
2016	WD	(Turkey) Bengisu Erçetin (Turkey) Zehra Erdem	(Denmark) Christine Busch Andreasen (Denmark) Mathilde Cramer Ahrens	(Scotland) Rachel Cameron (Scotland) Rachel Sugden	(France) Romane Cloteaux-Foucault (France) Ainoa Desmons
2016	XD	(Denmark) Sebastian Grønbjerg (Denmark) Clara Graversen	(Denmark) Rasmus Espersen (Denmark) Christine Busch Andreasen	(Russia) Georgii Karpov (Russia) Anastasiia Kurdyukova	(England) David Hong (England) Hope Warner
2018	MS	(France) Alex Lanier	(France) Simon Baron-Vezilier	(Denmark) Christian Faust Kjær	(Russia) Igor Pushkarev
2018	WS	(Russia) Mariia Golubeva	(England) Lisa Curtin	(Russia) Elizaveta Baranova	(Ukraine) Mariia Stoliarenko
2018	MD	(Denmark) Jakob Houe (Denmark) Christian Faust Kjær	(Denmark) Mikkel Langemark (Denmark) Jeppe Søby	(France) Simon Baron-Vezilier (France) Kimi Lovang	(Russia) Daniil Dubovenko (Russia) Maksim Ogloblin
2018	WD	(Russia) Elizaveta Baranova (Russia) Sofiia Bychkova	(Russia) Ekaterina Kazantseva (Russia) Ekaterina Tarasova	(France) Emilie Drouin (France) Tea Margueritte	(Russia) Maria Lezzhova (Russia) Elizaveta Malkova
2018	XD	(Russia) Egor Borisov (Russia) Mariia Golubeva	(Russia) Maksim Ogloblin (Russia) Elizaveta Malkova	(France) Kimi Lovang (France) Floriane Nurit	(France) Lucas Renoir (France) Tea Margueritte
2020	MS	(Sweden) Romeo Makboul	(England) Dillon Chong	(Denmark) William Bøgebjerg	(Sweden) Filip Swahn
2020	WS	(Finland) Nella Nyqvist	(Turkey) Ravza Bodur	(Russia) Galina Mezentseva	(Bulgaria) Kaloyana Nalbantova
2020	MD	(Denmark) William Bøgebjerg (Denmark) Robert Nebel	(Russia) Yaroslav Martynov (Russia) Aleksei Zaev	(Denmark) Mads Andersson (Denmark) Otto Reiler	(Sweden) Romeo Makboul (Sweden) Filip Swahn
2020	WD	(Denmark) Anna-Sofie Nielsen (Denmark) Maria Højlund Tommerup	(France) Clemence Gaudreau (France) Camille Pognante	(Turkey) Ravza Bodur (Turkey) Tugce Damar	(Russia) Polina Mastiaeva (Russia) Galina Mezentseva
2020	XD	(Russia) Yaroslav Martynov (Russia) Daria Kharlampovich	(Denmark) Robert Nebel (Denmark) Anna-Sofie Nielsen	(Turkey) Bugra Aktas (Turkey) Sinem Yildiz	(France) Erwan Hamel (France) Elsa Jacob
2022	MS	(Portugal) Tiago Berenguer	(France) Arthur Tatranov	(Spain) Yaidel Gil	(France) Nathan Nguyen
2022	WS	(Turkey) Aleyna Korkut	(France) Léana Laurent	(Turkey) Elifnur Demir	(Czech Republic) Amélie Maixnerová
2022	MD	(Denmark) Jens Andersson (Denmark) Aske Roslyng	(Denmark) Mikkel Bouet (Denmark) Frederik Hinding	(France) Timéo Bourgin (France) Nathan Nguyen	(France) Arthur Tatranov (France) Thomas Tournefier
2022	WD	(Romania) Daria-Irina Gherasim (Romania) Cristina Sîrbu	(Turkey) Elifnur Demir (Turkey) Zeynep Ocakoğlu	(Ukraine) Raiia Almalalha (Ukraine) Sofiia Bielobrovchuk	(France) Lily Gautier (France) Monitosita Touch
2022	XD	(Denmark) Jens Andersson (Denmark) Athene Thornild	(Denmark) Mikkel Bouet (Denmark) Eline Landsvig	(Spain) Mario Rodríguez (Spain) María Luisa Jiménez	(Sweden) Erik Blomberg (Sweden) Anvita Harakamani
2024	MS	(France) Lenny Hubert	(France) Mady Sow	(Switzerland) Santiago Araujo	(England) Yixiang Hou
2024	WS	(Poland) Wiktoria Kaletka	(Ukraine) Varvara Poperezhai	(Spain) María García	(Belgium) Lea Dauphinais
2024	MD	(France) Soren Marion-Gothsener (France) Mady Sow	(Denmark) Axel Boesen (Denmark) Marvin Mogensen	(Scotland) Charlie Junnor (Scotland) Alfie Martin	(Germany) Lovis Deters (Germany) Jannes Ernst
2024	WD	(England) Shraddha Gopalakrishnan (England) Martha Ng	(Denmark) Alva Jacobsen (Denmark) Simone Aoki Pihl	(Ukraine) Varvara Poperezhai (Ukraine) Ahata Ryshtovska	(France) Clara Ménégazzi-Briquet (France) Lison Prévost
2024	XD	(France) Lenny Hubert (France) Elisa Hess	(Denmark) Peter Faurholt (Denmark) Marie Kjær	(Lithuania) Dominik Tankevič (Lithuania) Uma Ivanauskaitė	(Slovenia) Tim Bregar (Croatia) Maja Pranić
2026	MS	(France) Esteyban Sainthuile	(Sweden) Anton Marchand Kemmo	(England) Aarav Kotian	(Lithuania) Ignas Martyšius
2026	WS	(England) Mutiara Mandala	(Bulgaria) Maria Popov	(France) Clara Ménégazzi-Briquet	(Denmark) Liva Heckmann
2026	MD	(France) Edgar Prévot (France) Esteyban Sainthuile	(Denmark) Tristan Riis (Denmark) Villum Smedegaard	(England) Aarav Kotian (England) Rory Le Masurier	(Lithuania) Ignas Martyšius (Lithuania) Daniel Tankevič
2026	WD	(France) Clara Ménégazzi-Briquet (France) Lison Prévost	(France) Mila Borrelly (France) Louane Bousseau	(England) Michelle Chen (England) Nidhi Shukla	(Germany) Ineke Block (Germany) Ruby Xu
2026	XD	(France) Ismaël Bouchikhi (France) Anastassya Tatranova	(Germany) Matti Hintze (Germany) Ineke Block	(England) Rory Le Masurier (England) Ava Dodkins	(Spain) Álvaro Gómez (Spain) Xulia Otero

== Medal count (2014 - 2026) ==
Rank	Nation	Gold	Silver	Bronze	Total
1	Denmark (DEN)	11	10	7	28
2	France (FRA)	8	8	14	30
3	England (ENG)	4	4	7	15
4	Russia (RUS)	4	3	10	17
5	Turkey (TUR)	2	2	6	10
6	Sweden (SWE)	1	1	3	5
7	Finland (FIN)	1	0	0	1
7	Netherlands (NED)	1	0	0	1
7	Poland (POL)	1	0	0	1
7	Portugal (POR)	1	0	0	1
7	Romania (ROU)	1	0	0	1
12	Ukraine (UKR)	0	3	3	6
13	Germany (GER)	0	1	3	4
14	Bulgaria (BUL)	0	1	1	2
15	Hungary (HUN)	0	1	0	1
15	Serbia (SRB)	0	1	0	1
17	Spain (ESP)	0	0	4	4
18	Czech Republic (CZE)	0	0	3	3
18	Lithuania (LTU)	0	0	3	3
18	Scotland (SCO)	0	0	3	3
21	Belgium (BEL)	0	0	1	1
21	Switzerland (SUI)	0	0	1	1
23	Croatia (CRO)	0	0	0.5	0.5
23	Slovenia (SLO)	0	0	0.5	0.5
Totals (24 entries)		35	35	70	140
