= Christo Popov =

French badminton player (born 2002)

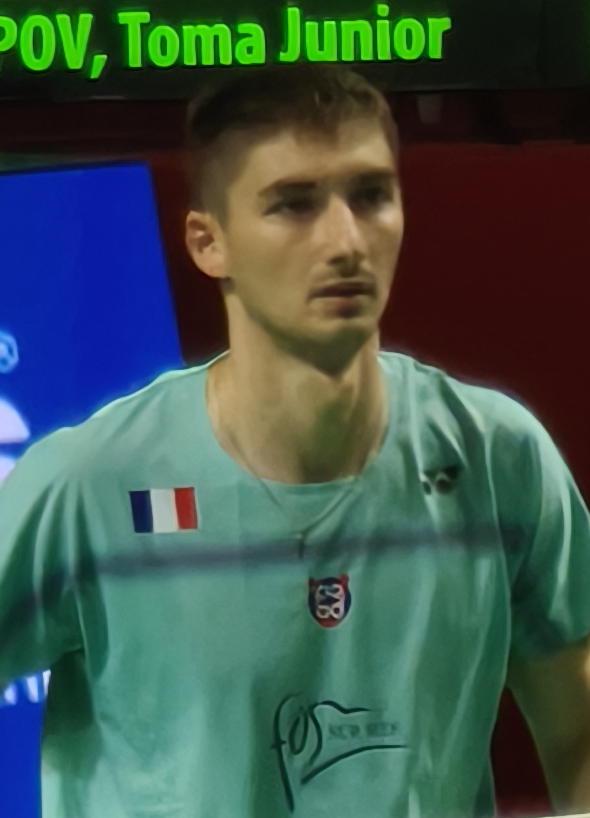
- Popov at the 2026 Indonesia Open

Personal information
- Born: 8 March 2002 (age 24) Sofia, Bulgaria
- Height: 1.79 m (5 ft 10 in)

Sport
- Country: France
- Sport: Badminton
- Handedness: Left

Men's singles & doubles
- Highest ranking: 1 (MS, 25 October 2026); 16 (MD with Toma Junior Popov, 29 July 2025)
- Current ranking: 1 (MS); 23 (MD with Toma Junior Popov) (10 November 2026)
- BWF profile
Medal record
Men's badminton
Representing France
Thomas Cup
Silver medal – second place	2026 Horsens	Men's team
European Games
Silver medal – second place	2023 Kraków–Małopolska	Men's singles
Bronze medal – third place	2023 Kraków–Małopolska	Men's doubles
European Championships
Gold medal – first place	2025 Horsens	Men's doubles
Gold medal – first place	2026 Huelva	Men's singles
Silver medal – second place	2026 Huelva	Men's doubles
Bronze medal – third place	2025 Horsens	Men's singles
European Mixed Team Championships
Silver medal – second place	2021 Vantaa	Mixed team
Silver medal – second place	2023 Aire-sur-la-Lys	Mixed team
Silver medal – second place	2025 Baku	Mixed team
European Men's Team Championships
Gold medal – first place	2026 Istanbul	Men's team
Silver medal – second place	2024 Łódź	Men's team
Bronze medal – third place	2020 Liévin	Men's team
World Junior Championships
Silver medal – second place	2019 Kazan	Boys' singles
European Junior Championships
Gold medal – first place	2017 Mulhouse	Mixed team
Gold medal – first place	2018 Tallinn	Mixed team
Gold medal – first place	2020 Lahti	Boys' singles
Silver medal – second place	2018 Tallinn	Boys' singles
Silver medal – second place	2020 Lahti	Mixed team
Bronze medal – third place	2020 Lahti	Mixed doubles

Christo Popov (born 8 March 2002) is a French badminton player who affiliates with Fos club. He is a European champion, having won the men's doubles in 2025 and the men's singles in 2026. He also won a silver in the men's singles and a bronze in the men's doubles at the 2023 European Games. He became the first Frenchman to reach the semi-finals of the All England Open. Popov is the reigning men's singles world number 1, became the first Frenchman to topped the BWF World Ranking.

Christo Popov was the boys' doubles European U15 and U17 Junior Champions, also won the boys' singles silver medals at the 2018 European and 2019 World Junior Championships. He reached a career high as boys' singles World Junior number 1 in January 2020. He then clinched the boys' singles title at the 2020 European Junior Championships.

== Early life ==
Christo Popov was born in Sofia, Bulgaria. He comes from a family featuring other professional badminton players. His father, Thomas, played for and coached the Bulgarian national team; his mother, Tzvetomira, was a national badminton referee; and his older brother, Toma Junior Popov, was a 2017 European Junior Champion.

== Career ==
Christo Popov started playing badminton at the age of 5. He won the European U15 and U17 Junior Champions in the boys' doubles event with Kenji Lovang in 2016 and 2017 respectively, also finished as boys' singles U15 runner-up in 2016. He later won the boys' singles silver medals at the 2018 European and 2019 World Junior Championships. He managed to win the 2017 Italian Junior International, Danish Junior Cup, also 2018 and 2019 Hungarian Junior International.

At the age of 16, he already won the senior international tournament at the 2018 Bulgarian Open in the men's doubles event with his brother Toma Junior Popov. Christo Popov topped the boys' singles World Junior Ranking on 7 January 2020. He won the men's singles in the 2020 French national championships and in doing so became the youngest ever winner of the competition At the 2020 European Men's and Women's Team Badminton Championships he won the bronze medal with the French national team. In March 2020, he claimed his first BWF Junior International Grand Prix title by winning the Dutch Junior tournament. At the 2020 European Junior Championships in Lahti, Finland, Popov claimed three medals, winning a gold in the boys' singles, a silver in the team, and a bronze in the mixed doubles events.

In 2021, Popov opened the season by participating in the European Mixed Team Championships together with the French national team. The team finished as the finalist and won the silver medal. In May, he received the BEC Young Player of the Year and European Fan Player of the Yeat by the Badminton Europe. At the 2021 Spain Masters, he finished as a men's doubles semi-finalist, losing to the eventual winner, Indonesia's Pramudya Kusumawardana and Yeremia Rambitan.

In 2024, Christo won two BWF World Tour Super 300 titles, both achieved in Germany which are the German Open and the Hylo Open. In the German Open, he defeated Danish Rasmus Gemke in two straight games to clinched his first ever World Tour title. Later in November, he defeated his own older brother Toma Junior Popov in the Hylo Open finals. The Popov brothers also competed for France at the 2024 Summer Olympics in the men's doubles event.

In 2025, Christo Popov reached a monumental milestone in his career by becoming the first French player to win the men's singles title at the BWF World Tour Finals in Hangzhou, China. Throughout the season, the 23-year-old showcased remarkable consistency, securing runner-up finishes at the Swiss Open and the French Open before his victory in December, where he defeated world No. 1 Shi Yuqi in straight games. Together with Toma, he also finished runner-up in the German Open. Additionally, he excelled on the continental stage by winning the gold medal in the men's doubles alongside his brother, Toma Junior Popov, and a bronze medal in the men's singles at the European Championships. These achievements propelled him to a career-high world ranking of No. 7 in the men's singles by late 2025, officially establishing him as France's top-ranked player.

In 2026, he began the season with a quarter-final berth at the India Open where he lost the match against Jonatan Christie. In February, Christo became a part of the first France team to win the European Men's Team Badminton Championship by defeating Denmark three games to two in the final. Christo also secured his first title of the year in March by defeating his brother, Toma at the German Open final. In April, Christo Popov won his first European Championships in men's singles when he defeated Anders Antonsen in the final in straight games. In the men's doubles, both him and his brother lost the final against the English pair, Ben Lane and Sean Vendy. Popov also made history with the French team, which reached the final of the Thomas Cup for the first time, and won the silver medal after being defeated by China. In July, Popov sealed a Japan Open title, beating the home favourite Koki Watanabe in straight games. He competed at the 2026 BWF World Championships in New Delhi, but was eliminated in the early rounds both in the singles and doubles. He reached a career high of World number 2 in the BWF world rankings released on 25 August 2026. Two months later in October, Popov won his home ground tournament, the French Open against Zaki Ubaidillah in a grueling three games. This win propelled him as the new world number 1 player in the men's singles.

== Achievements ==
=== European Games ===
Men's singles
Year	Venue	Opponent	Score	Result	Ref.
2023	Arena Jaskółka, Tarnów, Poland	(Denmark) Viktor Axelsen	21–16, 16–21, 11–21	Silver	

Men's doubles
Year	Venue	Partner	Opponent	Score	Result	Ref.
2023	Arena Jaskółka; Tarnów, Poland	(France) Toma Junior Popov	(United Kingdom) Ben Lane (United Kingdom) Sean Vendy	15–21, 14–21	Bronze	

=== European Championships ===
Men's singles
Year	Venue	Opponent	Score	Result	Ref.
2025	Forum, Horsens, Denmark	(France) Alex Lanier	15–21, 23–21, 19–21	Bronze	
2026	Palacio de los Deportes Carolina Marín, Huelva, Spain	(Denmark) Anders Antonsen	21–12, 21–19	Gold	

Men's doubles
Year	Venue	Partner	Opponent	Score	Result	Ref.
2025	Forum, Horsens, Denmark	(France) Toma Junior Popov	(France) Éloi Adam (France) Léo Rossi	21–12, 18–21, 21–18	Gold	
2026	Palacio de los Deportes Carolina Marín, Huelva, Spain	(France) Toma Junior Popov	(England) Ben Lane (England) Sean Vendy	15–21, 16–21	Silver	

=== BWF World Junior Championships ===
Boys' singles
Year	Venue	Opponent	Score	Result	Ref.
2019	Kazan Gymnastics Center, Kazan, Russia	(Thailand) Kunlavut Vitidsarn	8–21, 11–21	Silver	

=== European Junior Championships ===
Boys' singles
Year	Venue	Opponent	Score	Result	Ref.
2018	Kalev Sports Hall, Tallinn, Estonia	(France) Arnaud Merklé	7–21, 14–21	Silver	
2020	Pajulahti Sports Institute, Lahti, Finland	(France) Yanis Gaudin	21–9, 21–18	Gold	

Mixed doubles
Year	Venue	Partner	Opponent	Score	Result	Ref.
2020	Pajulahti Sports Institute; Lahti, Finland	(France) Flavie Vallet	(Sweden) Gustav Bjorkler (Sweden) Edith Urell	18–21, 21–13, 15–21	Bronze	

=== BWF World Tour (6 titles, 3 runners-up) ===
The BWF World Tour, which was announced on 19 March 2017 and implemented in 2018, is a series of elite badminton tournaments sanctioned by the Badminton World Federation (BWF). The BWF World Tour is divided into levels of World Tour Finals, Super 1000, Super 750, Super 500, Super 300 (part of the HSBC World Tour), and the BWF Tour Super 100.

Men's singles
Year	Tournament	Level	Opponent	Score	Result	Ref.
2024	German Open	Super 300	(Denmark) Rasmus Gemke	21–17, 21–16	(gold) Winner	
2024	Hylo Open	Super 300	(France) Toma Junior Popov	21–13, 21–10	(gold) Winner	
2025	Swiss Open	Super 300	(China) Weng Hongyang	18–21, 3–21	(silver) Runner-up	
2025	French Open	Super 750	(Denmark) Anders Antonsen	12–21, 19–21	(silver) Runner-up	
2025	BWF World Tour Finals	World Tour Finals	(China) Shi Yuqi	21–19, 21–9	(gold) Winner	
2026	German Open	Super 300	(France) Toma Junior Popov	21–16, 21–15	(gold) Winner	
2026	Japan Open	Super 750	(Japan) Koki Watanabe	21–11, 21–19	(gold) Winner	
2026	French Open	Super 750	(Indonesia) Zaki Ubaidillah	21–11, 14–21, 21–13	(gold) Winner	

Men's doubles
Year	Tournament	Level	Partner	Opponent	Score	Result	Ref.
2025	German Open	Super 300	(France) Toma Junior Popov	(South Korea) Kim Won-ho (South Korea) Seo Seung-jae	19–21, 17–21	(silver) Runner-up	

=== BWF International Challenge/Series (4 titles, 2 runners-up) ===
Men's singles
Year	Tournament	Opponent	Score	Result
2019	Italian International	(India) Subhankar Dey	21–16, 22–20	(gold) Winner
2022	Ukraine Open	(Malaysia) Ong Ken Yon	21–14, 22–20	(gold) Winner
2022	Nantes International	(Denmark) Mads Christophersen	8–21, 21–11, 14–21	(silver) Runner-up
2022	Dutch Open	(Denmark) Mads Christophersen	25–23, 21–10	(gold) Winner

Men's doubles
Year	Tournament	Partner	Opponent	Score	Result
2018	Bulgarian Open	(France) Toma Junior Popov	(Chinese Taipei) Chen Yu-jun (Chinese Taipei) Lin Bing-wei	17–21, 21–7, 21–17	(gold) Winner
2019	Italian International	(France) Toma Junior Popov	(Germany) Bjarne Geiss (Germany) Jan Colin Völker	18–21, 16–21	(silver) Runner-up

BWF International Challenge tournament
BWF International Series tournament
BWF Future Series tournament

=== BWF Junior International (5 titles, 4 runners-up) ===
Boys' singles
Year	Tournament	Opponent	Score	Result
2017	Hungarian Junior International	(Czech Republic) Ondřej Král	10–12, 11–6, 11–4, 11–13, 10–12	(silver) Runner-up
2017	Italian Junior International	(Belgium) Julien Carraggi	21–15, 21–11	(gold) Winner
2017	Romanian Junior International	(France) Arnaud Merklé	14–21, 10–21	(silver) Runner-up
2017	Danish Junior Cup	(Denmark) Karl Thor Søndergaard	21–16, 21–13	(gold) Winner
2018	Hungarian Junior International	(France) Arnaud Merklé	21–18, 10–21, 21–7	(gold) Winner
2018	Spanish Junior International	(France) Arnaud Merklé	21–16, 9–21, 13–21	(silver) Runner-up
2019	Hungarian Junior International	(Denmark) Axel Henrik Parkhøi	21–9, 18–21, 21–10	(gold) Winner
2019	Jakarta Junior International	(Indonesia) Syabda Perkasa Belawa	14–21, 17–21	(silver) Runner-up
2020	Dutch Junior International	(South Korea) Jin Yong	21–14, 21–10	(gold) Winner

BWF Junior International Grand Prix tournament
BWF Junior International Challenge tournament
BWF Junior International Series tournament
BWF Junior Future Series tournament
