= 2020 European Junior Badminton Championships – Mixed doubles =

Tournament details
- Dates: 2–7 November
- Venue: Pajulahti Sports Institute
- Location: Lahti, Finland

The mixed doubles tournament of the 2020 European Junior Badminton Championships was held from 2 to 7 November. Fabien Delrue and Juliette Moinard from France clinched this title in the last edition.

== Seeds ==
Seeds were announced on 16 October.

1. (Russia) Lev Barinov / Anastasiia Boiarun (semifinals)
2. (Germany) Aaron Sonnenschein / Leona Michalski (third round)
3. (Denmark) Marcus Rindshøj / Mette Werge (third round)
4. (Germany) Matthias Kicklitz / Thuc Phuong Nguyen (champions)
5. (Spain) Pelayo Pinto / Candela Arcos (second round)
6. (Spain) Salvador Franco / Maria de la O Perez (third round)
7. (Serbia) Mihajlo Tomic / Andjela Vitman (third round)
8. (Switzerland) Arthur Boudier / Caroline Racloz (second round)

== Draw ==
=== Finals ===
Semifinals
1	(Russia) Lev Barinov (Russia) Anastasiia Boiarun	21	10	22
4	(Germany) Matthias Kicklitz (Germany) Thuc Phuong Nguyen	14	21	24
(France) Christo Popov (France) Flavie Vallet	18	21	15
(Sweden) Gustav Bjorkler (Sweden) Edith Urell	21	13	21

Final
4	(Germany) Matthias Kicklitz (Germany) Thuc Phuong Nguyen	21	21
(Sweden) Gustav Bjorkler (Sweden) Edith Urell	19	19

=== Top half ===
==== Section 1 ====
First round
(France) L Renoir (France) T Margueritte	w	/	o
(Bulgaria) E Panev (Bulgaria) M Chepisheva
(Portugal) G Rodrigues (Portugal) M Neves	21	21
(Switzerland) N Franconville (Switzerland) L Amiguet	13	15
(Sweden) T Söderström (Sweden) J Silvennoinen	16	12
(Denmark) M Vestergaard (Denmark) C Løber	21	21

Second round
1	(Russia) L Barinov (Russia) A Boiarun	21	21
(Israel) G Hiram (Israel) H Neiman	4	10
(Italy) L Zhou (Italy) M Corsini	17	21
(France) L Renoir (France) T Margueritte	21	23
7	(Serbia) M Tomic (Serbia) A Vitman	21	21
(Portugal) G Rodrigues (Portugal) M Neves	16	15
(France) Y Gaudin (France) E Vercelot	12	9
(Denmark) M Vestergaard (Denmark) C Løber	21	21

Third round
1	(Russia) L Barinov (Russia) A Boiarun	21	22
(France) L Renoir (France) T Margueritte	11	20
7	(Serbia) M Tomic (Serbia) A Vitman	19	9
(Denmark) M Vestergaard (Denmark) C Løber	21	21

Quarterfinals
1	(Russia) L Barinov (Russia) A Boiarun	21	21
(Denmark) M Vestergaard (Denmark) C Løber	16	14

==== Section 2 ====
First round
(Czech Republic) J Janoštík (Czech Republic) T S van Coppenolle	23	21
(Finland) J Kuoppala (Finland) N Nokkala	21	11
(Germany) J Schlevoigt (Germany) J Meyer	21	19	21
(Austria) G Andree (Austria) E Wu	16	21	10
(Slovenia) J Babnik (Slovenia) T Pipan	5	17
(Ukraine) V Yakovlev (Ukraine) P Tkach	21	21

Second round
4	(Germany) M Kicklitz (Germany) T P Nguyen	21	21
(Estonia) T Kilk (Estonia) C Kruus	10	16
(Denmark) W K Boe (Denmark) F Østergaard	21	21
(Czech Republic) J Janoštík (Czech Republic) T S van Coppenolle	15	17
5	(Spain) P Pinto (Spain) C Arcos	19	18
(Germany) J Schlevoigt (Germany) J Meyer	21	21
(Croatia) B Vadlja (Croatia) B Janičić	5	14
(Ukraine) V Yakovlev (Ukraine) P Tkach	21	21

Third round
4	(Germany) M Kicklitz (Germany) T P Nguyen	21	21
(Denmark) W K Boe (Denmark) F Østergaard	14	14
(Germany) J Schlevoigt (Germany) J Meyer	16	16
(Ukraine) V Yakovlev (Ukraine) P Tkach	21	21

Quarterfinals
4	(Germany) M Kicklitz (Germany) T P Nguyen	21	21
(Ukraine) V Yakovlev (Ukraine) P Tkach	13	11

=== Bottom half ===
==== Section 3 ====
First round
(Czech Republic) A Ehm (Czech Republic) S Hořínková	21	21
(Austria) T Rudolf (Austria) K Pottendorfer	16	8
(Luxembourg) Y Feltes (Luxembourg) K Schmidt	5	16
(Russia) E Kholkin (Russia) R Galiakhmetova	21	21
(France) C Popov (France) F Vallet	21	21
(Ukraine) A Don (Ukraine) O Tykhorskaya	18	14

Second round
(Czech Republic) A Ehm (Czech Republic) S Hořínková	21	21
(Portugal) R Dias (Portugal) M Fortunato	14	19
(Russia) E Kholkin (Russia) R Galiakhmetova	23	21
8	(Switzerland) A Boudier (Switzerland) C Racloz	21	17
(France) C Popov (France) F Vallet	21	21
(Finland) E Melleri (Finland) J Monnberg	14	15
(Czech Republic) T Švejda (Czech Republic) L Krpatová	14	15
3	(Denmark) M Rindshøj (Denmark) M Werge	21	21

Third round
(Czech Republic) A Ehm (Czech Republic) S Hořínková	15	10
(Russia) E Kholkin (Russia) R Galiakhmetova	21	21
(France) C Popov (France) F Vallet	21	21
3	(Denmark) M Rindshøj (Denmark) M Werge	19	15

Quarterfinals
(Russia) E Kholkin (Russia) R Galiakhmetova	21	18	13
(France) C Popov (France) F Vallet	9	21	21

==== Section 4 ====
First round
(Bulgaria) S Nikolaev (Bulgaria) G Pavlova
(Russia) E Velp (Russia) E Filippova	w	/	o
(Finland) R Jäntti (Finland) N Nyqvist	17	20
(Slovenia) M Masten (Slovenia) A Jordan	21	22
(Scotland) C Smith (Scotland) E Waddell	12	14
(Sweden) G Bjorkler (Sweden) E Urell	21	21

Second round
(Russia) E Velp (Russia) E Filippova	20	21	21
(Italy) M Massetti (Italy) J Mair	22	14	12
(Slovenia) M Masten (Slovenia) A Jordan	17	18
6	(Spain) S Franco (Spain) M de la O Perez	21	21
(Sweden) G Bjorkler (Sweden) E Urell	21	21
(Serbia) I Kovacevic (Serbia) M Sudimac	12	10
(Estonia) O Männik (Estonia) R Üprus	19	16
2	(Germany) A Sonnenschein (Germany) L Michalski	21	21

Third round
(Russia) E Velp (Russia) E Filippova	21	21
6	(Spain) S Franco (Spain) M de la O Perez	10	15
(Sweden) G Bjorkler (Sweden) E Urell
2	(Germany) A Sonnenschein (Germany) L Michalski	13	11

Quarterfinals
(Russia) E Velp (Russia) E Filippova	13	21
(Sweden) G Bjorkler (Sweden) E Urell	21	23
