= Bengisu Erçetin =

Turkish badminton player (born 2001)

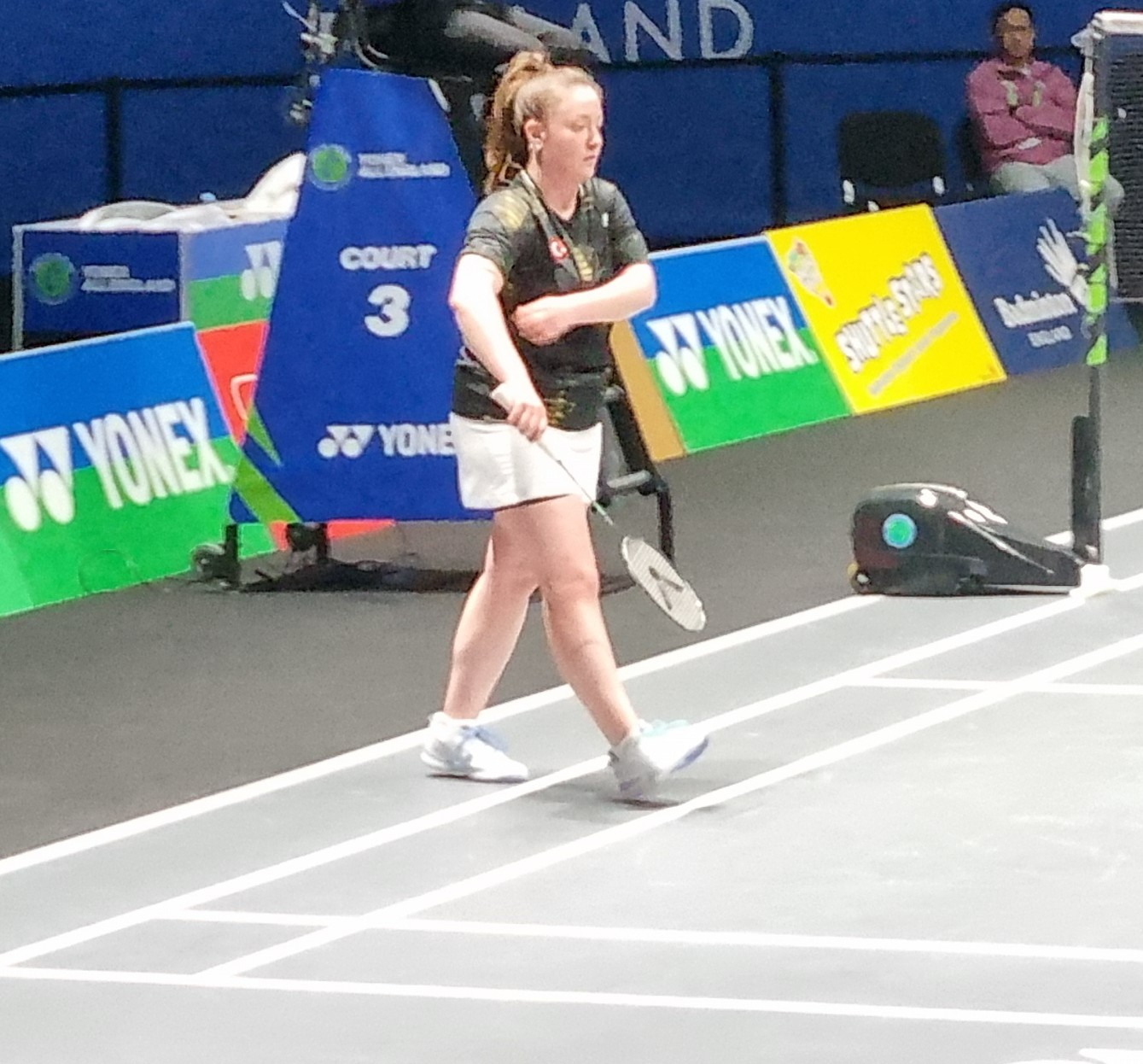

Personal information
- Born: 1 January 2001 (age 25) Istanbul, Turkey
- Height: 1.65 m (5 ft 5 in)
- Weight: 70 kg (154 lb)

Sport
- Country: Turkey
- Sport: Badminton

Women's doubles
- Highest ranking: 22 (with Nazlıcan İnci, 28 July 2026)
- Current ranking: 29 (with Nazlıcan İnci, 10 November 2026)
- BWF profile
Medal record
Women's badminton
Representing Turkey
European Championships
Silver medal – second place	2026 Huelva	Women's doubles
Bronze medal – third place	2024 Saarbrücken	Women's doubles
European Women's Team Championships
Bronze medal – third place	2026 Istanbul	Women's team
Mediterranean Games
Gold medal – first place	2022 Oran	Women's doubles
Gold medal – first place	2026 Taranto	Women's doubles
Silver medal – second place	2018 Tarragona	Women's doubles
European Junior Championships
Gold medal – first place	2018 Tallinn	Girls' doubles

Bengisu Erçetin (born 1 January 2001) is a Turkish badminton player. Erçetin won the gold medal at the 2018 European Junior Championships, 2022 Mediterranean Games, and the silver medal at the 2018 Mediterranean Games partnered with Nazlıcan İnci.

Erçetin's achievements began when she won the girls' doubles title at the 2016 European U15 Championships in Kazan, Russia partnered with Zehra Erdem, and also won the bronze medal in the singles event. Teamed-up with Nazlıcan İnci, they grabbed the silver medal in the U17 Championships in 2016, and made it to the gold medal in 2017 with Erdem. She won her first senior international tournament at the 2017 Turkey International tournament.

== Achievements ==
=== European Championships ===
Women's doubles
Year	Venue	Partner	Opponent	Score	Result	Ref.
2024	Saarlandhalle; Saarbrücken, Germany	(Turkey) Nazlıcan İnci	(Bulgaria) Gabriela Stoeva (Bulgaria) Stefani Stoeva	11–21, 15–21	Bronze	
2026	Palacio de los Deportes Carolina Marín; Huelva, Spain	(Turkey) Nazlıcan İnci	(Bulgaria) Gabriela Stoeva (Bulgaria) Stefani Stoeva	11–21, 17–21	Silver	

=== Mediterranean Games ===
Women's doubles
Year	Venue	Partner	Opponent	Score	Result	Ref.
2018	El Morell Pavilion; Tarragona, Spain	(Turkey) Nazlıcan İnci	(France) Delphine Delrue (France) Léa Palermo	17–21, 16–21	Silver	
2022	Multipurpose Omnisports Hall; Oued Tlélat, Algeria	(Turkey) Nazlıcan İnci	(Italy) Katharina Fink (Italy) Yasmine Hamza	21–15, 21–18	Gold	

=== European Junior Championships ===
Girls' doubles
Year	Venue	Partner	Opponent	Score	Result
2018	Kalev Sports Hall; Tallinn, Estonia	(Turkey) Nazlıcan İnci	(Denmark) Amalie Magelund (Denmark) Freja Ravn	14–21, 21–17, 21–17	Gold

=== BWF International Challenge/Series (11 titles, 9 runners-up) ===
Women's doubles
Year	Tournament	Partner	Opponent	Score	Result
2017	Bulgarian Open	(Turkey) Nazlıcan İnci	(Bulgaria) Gabriela Stoeva (Bulgaria) Stefani Stoeva	16–21, 12–21	(silver) Runner-up
2017	Hellas Open	(Turkey) Nazlıcan İnci	(Turkey) Özge Bayrak (Turkey) Cemre Fere	26–24, 22–24, 19–21	(silver) Runner-up
2017	Turkey International	(Turkey) Nazlıcan İnci	(Ukraine) Maryna Ilyinskaya (Ukraine) Yelyzaveta Zharka	21–13, 21–18	(gold) Winner
2018	Slovenia International	(Turkey) Nazlıcan İnci	(Germany) Eva Janssens (Germany) Stine Susan Küspert	23–21, 21–19	(gold) Winner
2019	Iran Fajr International	(Turkey) Nazlıcan İnci	(Indonesia) Nita Violina Marwah (Indonesia) Putri Syaikah	17–21, 18–21	(silver) Runner-up
2019	Lagos International	(Turkey) Nazlıcan İnci	(India) Pooja Dandu (India) Sanjana Santosh	18–21, 21–8, 14–21	(silver) Runner-up
2019	Bulgarian Open	(Turkey) Nazlıcan İnci	(Canada) Catherine Choi (Canada) Josephine Wu	21–8, 21–8	(gold) Winner
2019	Turkey Open	(Turkey) Nazlıcan İnci	(Turkey) Zehra Erdem (Turkey) İlayda Özelgül	21–13, 21–15	(gold) Winner
2020	Austrian Open	(Turkey) Nazlıcan İnci	(Japan) Tsukiko Yasaki (Japan) Erika Yokoyama	19–21, 15–21	(silver) Runner-up
2021	Polish Open	(Turkey) Nazlıcan İnci	(Poland) Zuzanna Jankowska (Poland) Anastasia Khomich	21–11, 21–12	(gold) Winner
2023	Portugal International	(Turkey) Nazlıcan İnci	(Denmark) Christine Busch (Denmark) Amalie Schulz	21–9, 21–17	(gold) Winner
2023	Bonn International	(Turkey) Nazlıcan İnci	(Chinese Taipei) Liu Zi-xi (Chinese Taipei) Yang Yi-hsun	21–11, 21–9	(gold) Winner
2023	Future Series Nouvelle-Aquitaine	(Turkey) Nazlıcan İnci	(France) Sharone Bauer (France) Emilie Vercelot	21–16, 21–9	(gold) Winner
2023	Polish International	(Turkey) Nazlıcan İnci	(England) Abbygael Harris (England) Annie Lado	21–16, 21–10	(gold) Winner
2024	Estonian International	(Turkey) Nazlıcan İnci	(England) Chloe Birch (England) Estelle van Leeuwen	23–21, 16–21, 21–8	(gold) Winner
2025	Swedish Open	(Turkey) Nazlıcan İnci	(Sweden) Moa Sjöö (Sweden) Tilda Sjöö	21–14, 21–17	(gold) Winner
2025	Iran Fajr International	(Turkey) Nazlıcan İnci	(Bulgaria) Gabriela Stoeva (Bulgaria) Stefani Stoeva	21–23, 16–21	(silver) Runner-up
2025	Italian Open	(Turkey) Nazlıcan İnci	(Bulgaria) Gabriela Stoeva (Bulgaria) Stefani Stoeva	19–21, 14–21	(silver) Runner-up
2025	Turkey International	(Turkey) Nazlıcan İnci	(Bulgaria) Gabriela Stoeva (Bulgaria) Stefani Stoeva	10–21, 19–21	(silver) Runner-up
2026	Turkey International	(Turkey) Nazlıcan İnci	(Japan) Mao Hatasue (Japan) Kanano Muroya	14–21, 18–21	(silver) Runner-up

BWF International Challenge tournament
BWF International Series tournament
BWF Future Series tournament
