= Nazlıcan İnci =

Turkish badminton player (born 2000)

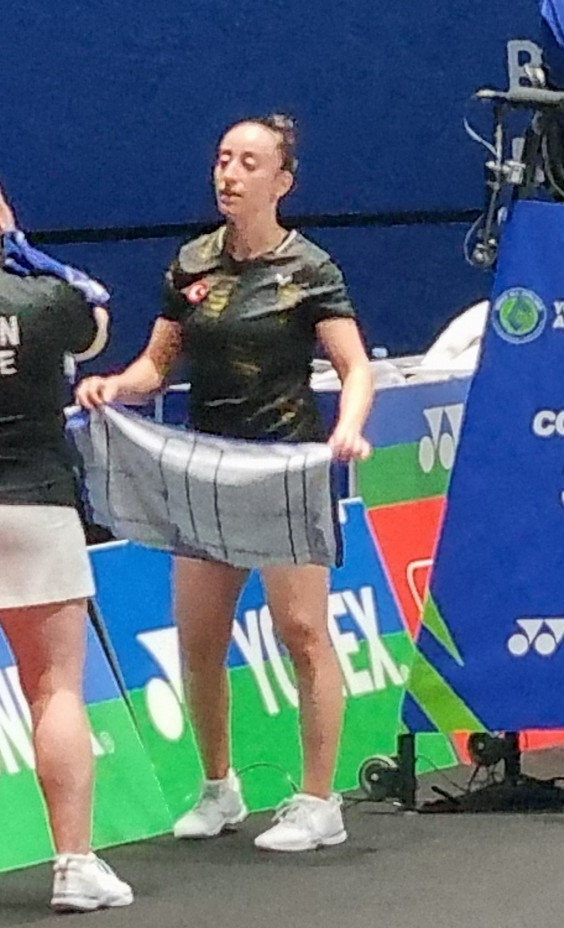

Personal information
- Born: 6 March 2000 (age 26) Erzincan, Erzincan, Turkey
- Height: 1.68 m (5 ft 6 in)
- Weight: 60 kg (132 lb)

Sport
- Country: Turkey
- Sport: Badminton

Women's doubles
- Highest ranking: 22 (with Bengisu Erçetin, 28 July 2026)
- Current ranking: 29 (with Bengisu Erçetin, 10 November 2026)
- BWF profile
Medal record
Women's badminton
Representing Turkey
European Championships
Silver medal – second place	2026 Huelva	Women's doubles
Bronze medal – third place	2024 Saarbrücken	Women's doubles
European Women's Team Championships
Bronze medal – third place	2026 Istanbul	Women's team
Mediterranean Games
Gold medal – first place	2022 Oran	Women's doubles
Gold medal – first place	2026 Taranto	Women's doubles
Silver medal – second place	2018 Tarragona	Women's doubles
European Junior Championships
Gold medal – first place	2018 Tallinn	Girls' doubles

Nazlıcan İnci (born 6 March 2000) is a Turkish badminton player. Teamed-up with Bengisu Erçetin, they grab the silver medal at the U17 European Championships in 2016. She won her first senior international tournament at the 2017 Turkey International tournament. İnci and Erçetin won the gold medal at the 2018 European Junior Championships, 2022 Mediterranean Games, and the silver medal at the 2018 Mediterranean Games.

== Achievements ==
=== European Championships ===
Women's doubles
Year	Venue	Partner	Opponent	Score	Result	Ref.
2024	Saarlandhalle; Saarbrücken, Germany	(Turkey) Bengisu Erçetin	(Bulgaria) Gabriela Stoeva (Bulgaria) Stefani Stoeva	11–21, 15–21	Bronze	
2026	Palacio de los Deportes Carolina Marín; Huelva, Spain	(Turkey) Bengisu Erçetin	(Bulgaria) Gabriela Stoeva (Bulgaria) Stefani Stoeva	11–21, 17–21	Silver	

=== Mediterranean Games ===
Women's doubles
Year	Venue	Partner	Opponent	Score	Result	Ref.
2018	El Morell Pavilion; Tarragona, Spain	(Turkey) Bengisu Erçetin	(France) Delphine Delrue (France) Léa Palermo	17–21, 16–21	Silver	
2022	Multipurpose Omnisports Hall; Oued Tlélat, Algeria	(Turkey) Bengisu Erçetin	(Italy) Katharina Fink (Italy) Yasmine Hamza	21–15, 21–18	Gold	

=== European Junior Championships ===
Girls' doubles
Year	Venue	Partner	Opponent	Score	Result
2018	Kalev Sports Hall; Tallinn, Estonia	(Turkey) Bengisu Erçetin	(Denmark) Amalie Magelund (Denmark) Freja Ravn	14–21, 21–17, 21–17	Gold

=== BWF International Challenge/Series (11 titles, 9 runners-up) ===
Women's doubles
Year	Tournament	Partner	Opponent	Score	Result
2017	Bulgarian Open	(Turkey) Bengisu Erçetin	(Bulgaria) Gabriela Stoeva (Bulgaria) Stefani Stoeva	16–21, 12–21	(silver) Runner-up
2017	Hellas Open	(Turkey) Bengisu Erçetin	(Turkey) Özge Bayrak (Turkey) Cemre Fere	26–24, 22–24, 19–21	(silver) Runner-up
2017	Turkey International	(Turkey) Bengisu Erçetin	(Ukraine) Maryna Ilyinskaya (Ukraine) Yelyzaveta Zharka	21–13, 21–18	(gold) Winner
2018	Slovenia International	(Turkey) Bengisu Erçetin	(Germany) Eva Janssens (Germany) Stine Küspert	23–21, 21–19	(gold) Winner
2019	Iran Fajr International	(Turkey) Bengisu Erçetin	(Indonesia) Nita Violina Marwah (Indonesia) Putri Syaikah	17–21, 18–21	(silver) Runner-up
2019	Lagos International	(Turkey) Bengisu Erçetin	(India) Pooja Dandu (India) Sanjana Santosh	18–21, 21–8, 14–21	(silver) Runner-up
2019	Bulgarian Open	(Turkey) Bengisu Erçetin	(Canada) Catherine Choi (Canada) Josephine Wu	21–8, 21–8	(gold) Winner
2019	Turkey Open	(Turkey) Bengisu Erçetin	(Turkey) Zehra Erdem (Turkey) İlayda Özelgül	21–13, 21–15	(gold) Winner
2020	Austrian Open	(Turkey) Bengisu Erçetin	(Japan) Tsukiko Yasaki (Japan) Erika Yokoyama	19–21, 15–21	(silver) Runner-up
2021	Polish Open	(Turkey) Bengisu Erçetin	(Poland) Zuzanna Jankowska (Poland) Anastasia Khomich	21–11, 21–12	(gold) Winner
2023	Portugal International	(Turkey) Bengisu Erçetin	(Denmark) Christine Busch (Denmark) Amalie Schulz	21–9, 21–17	(gold) Winner
2023	Bonn International	(Turkey) Bengisu Erçetin	(Chinese Taipei) Liu Zi-xi (Chinese Taipei) Yang Yi-hsun	21–11, 21–9	(gold) Winner
2023	Future Series Nouvelle-Aquitaine	(Turkey) Bengisu Erçetin	(France) Sharone Bauer (France) Emilie Vercelot	21–16, 21–9	(gold) Winner
2023	Polish International	(Turkey) Bengisu Erçetin	(England) Abbygael Harris (England) Annie Lado	21–16, 21–10	(gold) Winner
2024	Estonian International	(Turkey) Bengisu Erçetin	(England) Chloe Birch (England) Estelle van Leeuwen	23–21, 16–21, 21–8	(gold) Winner
2025	Swedish Open	(Turkey) Bengisu Erçetin	(Sweden) Moa Sjöö (Sweden) Tilda Sjöö	21–14, 21–17	(gold) Winner
2025	Iran Fajr International	(Turkey) Bengisu Erçetin	(Bulgaria) Gabriela Stoeva (Bulgaria) Stefani Stoeva	21–23, 16–21	(silver) Runner-up
2025	Italian Open	(Turkey) Bengisu Erçetin	(Bulgaria) Gabriela Stoeva (Bulgaria) Stefani Stoeva	19–21, 14–21	(silver) Runner-up
2025	Turkey International	(Turkey) Bengisu Erçetin	(Bulgaria) Gabriela Stoeva (Bulgaria) Stefani Stoeva	10–21, 19–21	(silver) Runner-up
2026	Turkey International	(Turkey) Bengisu Erçetin	(Japan) Mao Hatasue (Japan) Kanano Muroya	14–21, 18–21	(silver) Runner-up

BWF International Challenge tournament
BWF International Series tournament
BWF Future Series tournament
