= Arnaud Merklé =

French badminton player (born 2000)

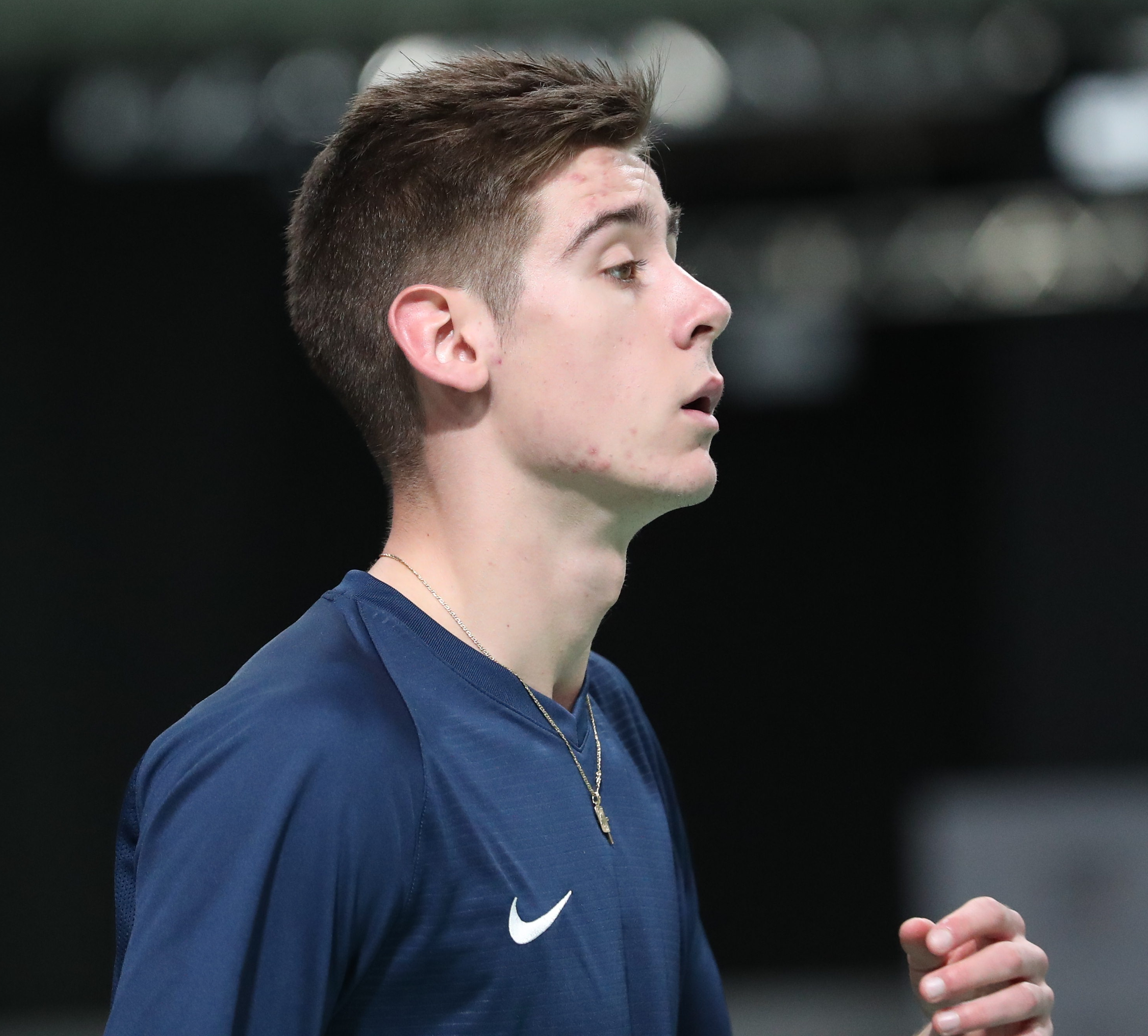

Personal information
- Born: Arnaud-Sylvain-André Merklé; 25 April 2000 (age 26) Staffelfelden, Mulhouse, France
- Height: 1.91 m (6 ft 3 in)
- Weight: 76 kg (168 lb)

Sport
- Country: France
- Sport: Badminton
- Handedness: Right

Men's singles
- Career record: 261 wins, 87 losses
- Highest ranking: 32 (14 April 2026)
- Current ranking: 44 (10 November 2026)
- BWF profile
Medal record
Men's badminton
Representing France
European Championships
Bronze medal – third place	2026 Huelva	Men's singles
European Mixed Team Championships
Silver medal – second place	2021 Vantaa	Mixed team
European Men's Team Championships
Gold medal – first place	2026 Istanbul	Men's team
Silver medal – second place	2024 Łódź	Men's team
Bronze medal – third place	2020 Liévin	Men's team
European Junior Championships
Gold medal – first place	2017 Mulhouse	Mixed team
Gold medal – first place	2018 Tallinn	Boys' singles
Gold medal – first place	2018 Tallinn	Mixed team
Silver medal – second place	2017 Mulhouse	Boys' singles

Arnaud-Sylvain-André Merklé (French pronunciation: [aʁno silvɛ̃ ɑ̃dʁe mɛʁkle]; born 25 April 2000) is a French badminton player from Staffelfelden. He was the boys singles European Junior Champion in 2018, and also part of the national junior team that clinched the mixed team title in 2017 and 2018. He participated at the 2018 Summer Youth Olympics in Buenos Aires, Argentina, and reached the boys' singles bronze medal match losing to Kodai Naraoka of Japan in the rubber game.

== Career ==
In 2022, Merklé reached his first BWF World Tour final at the Syed Modi International. The final match between Merklé and his compatriot Lucas Claerbout was called off after Merklé tested positive for COVID-19. Both players were later awarded as runner-up with 5.950 ranking point.

In 2025, Merklé won the Swedish Open in January, and then the Polish Open in March.

== Achievements ==
=== European Championships ===
Men's singles
Year	Venue	Opponent	Score	Result
2026	Palacio de los Deportes Carolina Marín, Huelva, Spain	(Denmark) Anders Antonsen	18–21, 13–21	Bronze

=== European Junior Championships ===
Boys' singles
Year	Venue	Opponent	Score	Result
2017	Centre Sportif Régional d'Alsace; Mulhouse, France	(France) Toma Junior Popov	14–21, 15–21	Silver
2018	Kalev Sports Hall; Tallinn, Estonia	(France) Christo Popov	21–7, 21–14	Gold

=== BWF World Tour (2 runners-up) ===
The BWF World Tour, which was announced on 19 March 2017 and implemented in 2018, is a series of elite badminton tournaments sanctioned by the Badminton World Federation (BWF). The BWF World Tour is divided into levels of World Tour Finals, Super 1000, Super 750, Super 500, Super 300, and the BWF Tour Super 100.

Men's singles
Year	Tournament	Level	Opponent	Score	Result
2022	Syed Modi International	Super 300	(France) Lucas Claerbout	Withdrew	(silver) Runner-up
2025	Vietnam Open	Super 100	(Thailand) Panitchaphon Teeraratsakul	16–21, 10–21	(silver) Runner-up

=== BWF International Challenge/Series (13 titles, 2 runners-up) ===
Men's singles
Year	Tournament	Opponent	Score	Result
2018	Bulgarian Open	(France) Toma Junior Popov	20–22, 12–21	(silver) Runner-up
2019	Estonian International	(Netherlands) Joran Kweekel	21–8, 21–16	(gold) Winner
2019	German International	(Germany) Max Weißkirchen	22–20, 21–12	(gold) Winner
2021	Slovenian International	(Indonesia) Panji Ahmad Maulana	21–8, 21–10	(gold) Winner
2021	Austrian Open	(Indonesia) Panji Ahmad Maulana	21–11, 8–21, 15–21	(silver) Runner-up
2021	Welsh International	(India) Siril Verma	21–14, 11–21, 21–15	(gold) Winner
2022	Uganda International	(India) Harshit Aggarwal	21–15, 18–21, 21–16	(gold) Winner
2023	Nantes International	(Indonesia) Jason Christ Alexander	21–18, 21–16	(gold) Winner
2023	Réunion Open	(Chinese Taipei) Huang Yu-kai	21–19, 21–19	(gold) Winner
2025	Swedish Open	(Denmark) Jeppe Bruun	19–21, 21–16, 21–16	(gold) Winner
2025	Polish Open	(Finland) Joakim Oldorff	21–15, 21–17	(gold) Winner
2025	Denmark Challenge	(Chinese Taipei) Ting Yen-chen	21–15, 13–21, 22–20	(gold) Winner
2025	Dutch Open	(Sweden) Gustav Björkler	20–22, 21–15, 21–15	(gold) Winner
2025	Irish Open	(Israel) Daniil Dubovenko	21–14, 26–24	(gold) Winner
2025	Scottish Open	(Finland) Joakim Oldorff	21–7, 21–17	(gold) Winner

BWF International Challenge tournament
BWF International Series tournament
BWF Future Series tournament
