= Julien Carraggi =

Belgian badminton player (born 2000)

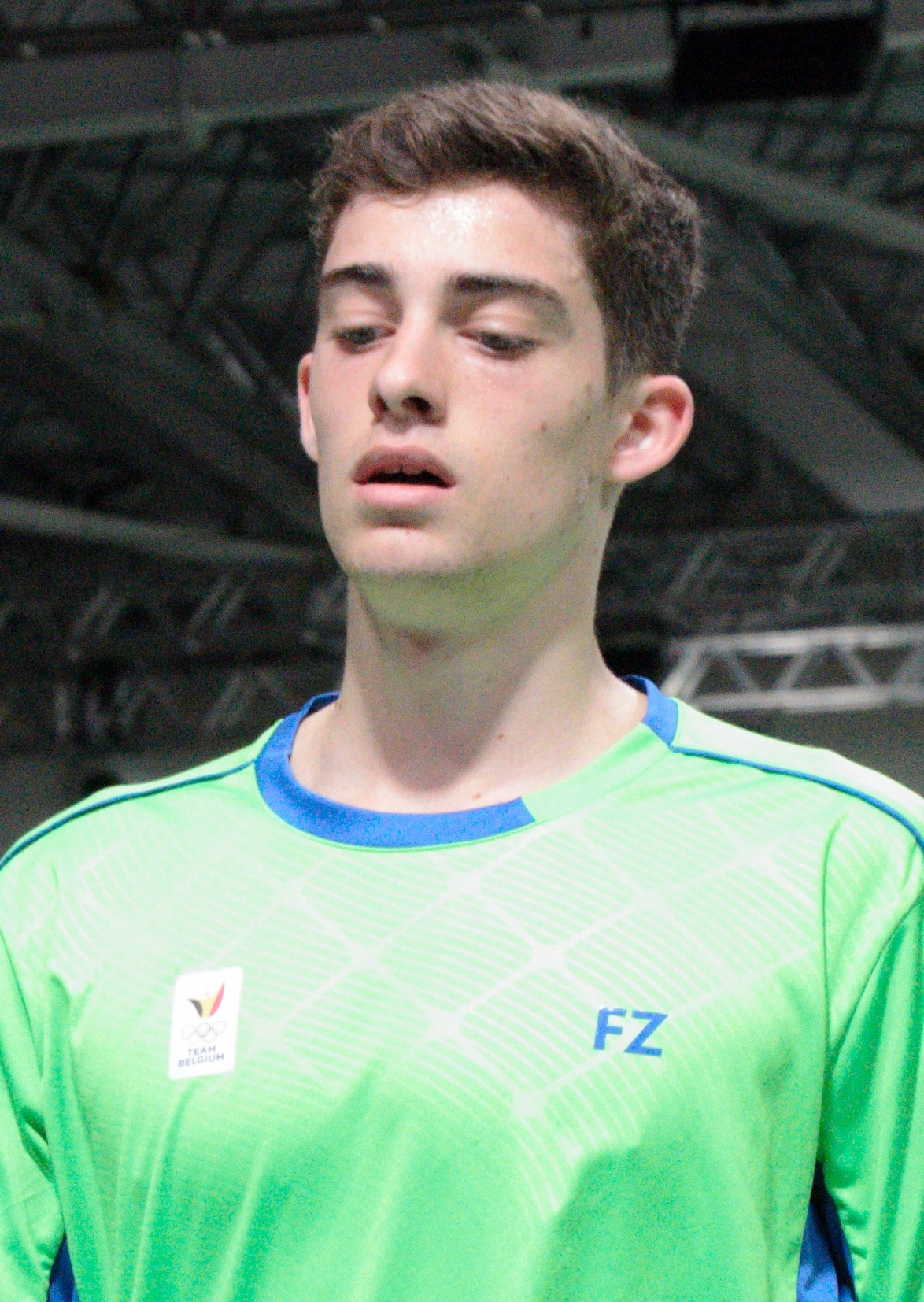
- Carraggi at the 2018 Summer Youth Olympics

Personal information
- Born: 2 July 2000 (age 26) Brussels, Belgium
- Height: 1.76 m (5 ft 9 in)

Sport
- Country: Belgium
- Sport: Badminton
- Handedness: Right
- Coached by: Wouter Claes

Men's singles & doubles
- Highest ranking: 40 (MS, 29 August 2023); 583 (MD with Jona van Nieuwkerke, 18 October 2022)
- Current ranking: 51 (MS, 3 November 2026)
- BWF profile
Medal record
Men's badminton
Representing (International Olympic Committee) Mixed-NOCs
Youth Olympic Games
Bronze medal – third place	2018 Buenos Aires	Mixed team

Julien Carraggi (born 2 July 2000) is a Belgian badminton player. Carraggi participated at the 2018 Summer Youth Olympics, helping the team Theta to win the bronze medal in the mixed team event.

== Career ==
=== 2021 ===
Carraggi became Belgian Badminton Champion in 2021, in which he won against Frédéric Gaspard 21–7 and 21–4.

=== 2022 ===
In January, he lost in the quarter-finals of Syed Modi International from Irish player Nhat Nguyen. Carraggi became Belgian Champion for the 2nd time, where he won against Yaro van Delsen 21–15, 20–22 and 21–9.

=== 2023 ===
In April, he competed in the Dutch International tournament and won his first international title in the final by defeating Dutch player Joran Kwekeel. He then proceeded to win his second senior title in the next month at Austrian Open, after defeating Huang Yu-kai from Chinese Taipei.

=== 2024 ===
In July, he represented his country at the 2024 Summer Olympics.

== Achievements ==
=== BWF International Challenge/Series (4 titles, 1 runner-up) ===
Men's singles
Year	Tournament	Opponent	Score	Result	Ref.
2023	Dutch International	(Netherlands) Joran Kweekel	21–17, 17–21, 21–16	(gold) Winner	
2023	Austrian Open	(Chinese Taipei) Huang Yu-kai	21–19, 21–10	(gold) Winner	
2024	Belgian International	(Denmark) Mads Christophersen	21–16, 12–21, 21–19	(gold) Winner	
2024	Scottish Open	(Netherlands) Joran Kweekel	21–17, 18–21, 21–15	(gold) Winner	
2025	Belgian International	(Japan) Minoru Koga	14–21, 20–22	(silver) Runner-up	

BWF International Challenge tournament
BWF International Series tournament
BWF Future Series tournament

=== BWF Junior International (3 titles) ===
Boys' singles
Year	Tournament	Opponent	Score	Result
2017	Portuguese Junior International	(Kazakhstan) Dmitriy Panarin	15–21, 21–18, 21–14	(gold) Winner
2018	Belgian Junior International	(Spain) Ernesto Baschwitz	21–10, 21–15	(gold) Winner

BWF Junior International Grand Prix tournament
BWF Junior International Challenge tournament
BWF Junior International Series tournament
BWF Junior Future Series tournament

Boys' doubles
Year	Tournament	Partner	Opponent	Score	Result
2018	Portuguese Junior International	(Belgium) Jona van Nieuwkerke	(France) Gabriel Rodrigues (France) Theo Vaur	21–17, 21–13	(gold) Winner

BWF Junior International Grand Prix tournament
BWF Junior International Challenge tournament
BWF Junior International Series tournament
BWF Junior Future Series tournament
