= 2023 BWF Continental Circuit =

Tournament details
- Dates: 10 January – 17 December
- Edition: 17th

The 2023 BWF Continental Circuit is a Grade 3 badminton tournaments in 2023 organized by each continental confederation under the auspices of the BWF. The circuit consists of 85 tournaments, which are divided into three levels:

- International Challenge (33 tournaments)
- International Series (32 tournaments)
- Future Series (20 tournaments).

Each of these tournaments offers different ranking points and prize money.

== Points distribution ==
Below is the point distribution table for each phase of the tournament based on the BWF points system for the BWF Continental Circuit events.

Tournament	Winner	Runner-up	3/4	5/8	9/16	17/32	33/64	65/128	129/256
International Challenge	4,000	3,400	2,800	2,200	1,520	920	360	170	70
International Series	2,500	2,130	1,750	1,370	920	550	210	100	40
Future Series	1,700	1,420	1,170	920	600	350	130	60	20

== Results ==
Below is the schedule released by Badminton World Federation:

=== Winners ===
==== International Challenge ====
Tour	Men's singles	Women's singles	Men's doubles	Women's doubles	Mixed doubles
Iran Fajr International	(Indonesia) Syabda Perkasa Belawa	(India) Tanya Hemanth	(Philippines) Christian Bernardo (Philippines) Alvin Morada	(Indonesia) Jesita Putri Miantoro (Indonesia) Febi Setianingrum	(Malaysia) Chen Tang Jie (Malaysia) Toh Ee Wei
Uganda International	(Malaysia) Justin Hoh	(Malaysia) Letshanaa Karupathevan	(Thailand) Pongsakorn Thongkham (Thailand) Wongsathorn Thongkham	(India) Trisha Hegde (India) Khushi Thakkar	(Singapore) Andy Kwek (Singapore) Crystal Wong
Thailand International	(Japan) Minoru Koga	(Japan) Asuka Takahashi	(Thailand) Chaloempon Charoenkitamorn (Thailand) Nanthakarn Yordphaisong	(Chinese Taipei) Liu Chiao-yun (Chinese Taipei) Wang Yu-qiao	(Thailand) Ruttanapak Oupthong (Thailand) Jhenicha Sudjaipraparat
Vietnam International	(Japan) Takuma Obayashi	(Vietnam) Nguyễn Thùy Linh	(South Korea) Jin Yong (South Korea) Na Sung-seung	(South Korea) Lee Yu-lim (South Korea) Shin Seung-chan	(Indonesia) Jafar Hidayatullah (Indonesia) Aisyah Salsabila Putri Pranata
Polish Open	(France) Alex Lanier	(Singapore) Yeo Jia Min	(Denmark) Daniel Lundgaard (Denmark) Mads Vestergaard	(Singapore) Jin Yujia (Singapore) Crystal Wong	(Denmark) Mads Vestergaard (Denmark) Christine Busch
Osaka International	(Japan) Yushi Tanaka	(Japan) Shiori Saito	(Japan) Hiroki Midorikawa (Japan) Kyohei Yamashita	(South Korea) Lee Yu-lim (South Korea) Shin Seung-chan	(South Korea) Wang Chan (South Korea) Shin Seung-chan
Mexican International	(Czech Republic) Jan Louda	(Japan) Manami Suizu	(Denmark) Daniel Lundgaard (Denmark) Mads Vestergaard	(Japan) Sayaka Hobara (Japan) Yui Suizu	(United States) Vinson Chiu (United States) Jennie Gai
Slovenia Open	(India) Sameer Verma	(Chinese Taipei) Huang Yu-hsun	(Malaysia) Low Hang Yee (Malaysia) Ng Eng Cheong	(Chinese Taipei) Liu Chiao-yun (Chinese Taipei) Wang Yu-qiao	(Denmark) Jesper Toft (Denmark) Clara Graversen
Italian International	Cancelled (Note: This tournament, originally to be played on 1–4 June, was later cancelled.)				
Maldives International	(India) Ravi	(India) Ashmita Chaliha	(Thailand) Pharanyu Kaosamaang (Thailand) Worrapol Thongsa-nga	(Thailand) Laksika Kanlaha (Thailand) Phataimas Muenwong	(Malaysia) Hoo Pang Ron (Malaysia) Teoh Mei Xing
Northern Marianas Open	(Chinese Taipei) Liao Jhuo-fu	(South Korea) Kim Ga-ram	(Chinese Taipei) Wei Chun-wei (Chinese Taipei) Wu Guan-xun	(Chinese Taipei) Hsu Ya-ching (Chinese Taipei) Lin Wan-ching	(South Korea) Wang Chan (South Korea) Shin Seung-chan
Denmark Masters	(Chinese Taipei) Huang Yu-kai	(Estonia) Kristin Kuuba	(Denmark) Rasmus Kjær (Denmark) Frederik Søgaard	(Chinese Taipei) Hsieh Pei-shan (Chinese Taipei) Tseng Yu-chi	(India) Rohan Kapoor (India) N. Sikki Reddy
Saipan International	(Japan) Takuma Obayashi	(Japan) Tomoka Miyazaki	(Chinese Taipei) Lee Fang-chih (Chinese Taipei) Lee Fang-jen	(Chinese Taipei) Hsu Ya-ching (Chinese Taipei) Lin Wan-ching	(United States) Presley Smith (United States) Allison Lee
Nantes International	(France) Arnaud Merklé	(Indonesia) Komang Ayu Cahya Dewi	(Malaysia) Junaidi Arif (Malaysia) Yap Roy King	(India) Tanisha Crasto (India) Ashwini Ponnappa	(Denmark) Mads Vestergaard (Denmark) Christine Busch
China International	(China) Lei Lanxi	(China) Chen Lu	(China) Chen Xujun (China) Peng Jianqin	(China) Xia Yuting (China) Zhou Xinru	(China) Cheng Xing (China) Chen Fanghui
Mongolia International	(Hong Kong) Chan Yin Chak	(Japan) Akari Kurihara	(Malaysia) Low Hang Yee (Malaysia) Ng Eng Cheong	(Hong Kong) Lui Lok Lok (Hong Kong) Ng Wing Yung	(Australia) Kenneth Choo (Australia) Gronya Somerville
Réunion Open	(France) Arnaud Merklé	(Japan) Hina Akechi	(India) Krishna Prasad Garaga (India) Vishnuvardhan Goud Panjala	(France) Margot Lambert (France) Anne Tran	(Algeria) Koceila Mammeri (Algeria) Tanina Mammeri
Lagos International Classics	(Brazil) Jonathan Matias	(Peru) Inés Castillo	(India) P.S Ravikrishna (India) Sankar Prasad Udayakumar	(India) Simran Singhi (India) Ritika Thaker	(Peru) José Guevara (Peru) Inés Castillo
Indonesia International (Medan)	(Indonesia) Alwi Farhan	(Indonesia) Ester Nurumi Tri Wardoyo	(Indonesia) Berry Angriawan (Indonesia) Rian Agung Saputro	(Indonesia) Jesita Putri Miantoro (Indonesia) Febi Setianingrum	(Thailand) Weeraphat Phakjarung (Thailand) Ornnicha Jongsathapornparn
Guatemala International	(Brazil) Ygor Coelho	(India) Samiya Imad Farooqui	(Canada) Kevin Lee (Canada) Ty Alexander Lindeman	(Canada) Catherine Choi (Canada) Josephine Wu	(Canada) Ty Alexander Lindeman (Canada) Josephine Wu
Belgian International	(France) Lucas Claerbout	(Turkey) Neslihan Arın	(Denmark) Andreas Søndergaard (Denmark) Jesper Toft	(Japan) Maiko Kawazoe (Japan) Haruna Konishi	(England) Marcus Ellis (England) Lauren Smith
Peru Challenge	(Japan) Takuma Kawamoto	(Japan) Kaoru Sugiyama	(Canada) Kevin Lee (Canada) Ty Alexander Lindeman	(United States) Annie Xu (United States) Kerry Xu	(Canada) Ty Alexander Lindeman (Canada) Josephine Wu
Scottish Open	(Denmark) Mads Christophersen	(Turkey) Neslihan Arın	(Denmark) Daniel Lundgaard (Denmark) Mads Vestergaard	(Bulgaria) Gabriela Stoeva (Bulgaria) Stefani Stoeva	(Denmark) Mads Vestergaard (Denmark) Christine Busch
Bendigo International	(Japan) Keita Makino	(Singapore) Jaslyn Hooi	(Chinese Taipei) Chen Cheng-kuan (Chinese Taipei) Chen Sheng-fa	(Australia) Setyana Mapasa (Australia) Angela Yu	(Chinese Taipei) Chen Sheng-fa (Chinese Taipei) Lin Jhih-yun
Dutch Open	(Denmark) Victor Svendsen	(Denmark) Julie Dawall Jakobsen	(England) Rory Easton (England) Zach Russ	(Netherlands) Debora Jille (Netherlands) Cheryl Seinen	(England) Callum Hemming (England) Estelle van Leeuwen
Indonesia International (Surabaya)	(Malaysia) Aidil Sholeh	(South Korea) Sim Yu-jin	(Japan) Kenya Mitsuhashi (Japan) Hiroki Okamura	(Thailand) Laksika Kanlaha (Thailand) Phataimas Muenwong	(Japan) Hiroki Nishi (Japan) Akari Sato
North Harbour International	Cancelled				
India International (Bengaluru)	(India) Sathish Kumar Karunakaran	(India) Isharani Baruah	(India) Hariharan Amsakarunan (India) Ruban Kumar Rethinasabapathi	(Japan) Miku Shigeta (Japan) Maya Taguchi	(Thailand) Phatharathorn Nipornram (Thailand) Nattamon Laisuan
India International (Raipur)	(India) Sathish Kumar Karunakaran	(India) Unnati Hooda	(Thailand) Chaloempon Charoenkitamorn (Thailand) Thanawin Madee	(Thailand) Tidapron Kleebyeesun (Thailand) Nattamon Laisuan	(India) Sathish Kumar Karunakaran (India) Aadya Variyath
Irish Open	(Republic of Ireland) Nhat Nguyen	(Chinese Taipei) Yang Yu-chi	(Scotland) Christopher Grimley (Scotland) Matthew Grimley	(Denmark) Maiken Fruergaard (Denmark) Sara Thygesen	(Singapore) Terry Hee (Singapore) Jessica Tan
Malaysia International	(Japan) Minoru Koga	(Japan) Miho Kayama	(Japan) Takuto Inoue (Japan) Masayuki Onodera	(Chinese Taipei) Lin Chih-chun (Chinese Taipei) Sung Yu-hsuan	(Malaysia) Hoo Pang Ron (Malaysia) Cheng Su Yin
Bahrain International	(Japan) Minoru Koga	(China) Chen Lu	(Japan) Kazuki Shibata (Japan) Naoki Yamada	(Bulgaria) Gabriela Stoeva (Bulgaria) Stefani Stoeva	(China) Zhou Zhihong (China) Yang Jiayi
Welsh International	(Finland) Joakim Oldorff	(France) Rosy Oktavia Pancasari	(Scotland) Christopher Grimley (Scotland) Matthew Grimley	(Bulgaria) Gabriela Stoeva (Bulgaria) Stefani Stoeva	(Germany) Jan Colin Völker (Germany) Stine Küspert
El Salvador International	(Guatemala) Kevin Cordón	(Brazil) Juliana Vieira	(Canada) Kevin Lee (Canada) Ty Alexander Lindeman	(United States) Francesca Corbett (United States) Allison Lee	(United States) Presley Smith (United States) Allison Lee
Canadian International	(Canada) Brian Yang	(Canada) Wenyu Zhang	(Malaysia) Mohamad Arif Abdul Latif (Canada) Jonathan Lai	(Canada) Jacqueline Cheung (Canada) Rachel Honderich	(Indonesia) Rian Agung Saputro (Indonesia) Serena Kani
Bangladesh International	Cancelled (Note: This tournament, originally to be played on 6–10 December, was later cancelled.)				

==== International Series ====
Tour	Men's singles	Women's singles	Men's doubles	Women's doubles	Mixed doubles
Estonian International	(Japan) Yushi Tanaka	(Chinese Taipei) Huang Yu-hsun	(Japan) Shuntaro Mezaki (Japan) Haruya Nishida	(United States) Paula Lynn Cao Hok (United States) Lauren Lam	(Denmark) Mads Vestergaard (Denmark) Christine Busch
Portugal International	(England) Johnnie Torjussen	(Turkey) Neslihan Arın	(France) Julien Maio (France) William Villeger	(Turkey) Bengisu Erçetin (Turkey) Nazlıcan İnci	(Denmark) Andreas Søndergaard (Denmark) Iben Bergstein
Dutch International	(Belgium) Julien Carraggi	(Chinese Taipei) Huang Yu-hsun	(Japan) Kazuhiro Ichikawa (Japan) Daiki Umayahara	(Chinese Taipei) Hsu Yin-hui (Chinese Taipei) Lee Chih-chen	(Australia) Kenneth Choo (Australia) Gronya Somerville
Luxembourg Open	(India) Sankar Subramanian	(Japan) Hina Akechi	(Denmark) William Kryger Boe (Denmark) Christian Faust Kjaer	(Netherlands) Kirsten de Wit (Netherlands) Alyssa Tirtosentono	(Germany) Patrick Scheiel (Germany) Franziska Volkmann
Swedish Open	(Denmark) Victor Svendsen	(Japan) Hina Akechi	(Indonesia) Raymond Indra (Indonesia) Daniel Edgar Marvino	(Japan) Maiko Kawazoe (Japan) Sorano Yoshikawa	(Indonesia) Jafar Hidayatullah (Indonesia) Aisyah Salsabila Putri Pranata
Austrian Open	(Belgium) Julien Carraggi	(Chinese Taipei) Wang Yu-si	(Malaysia) Low Hang Yee (Malaysia) Ng Eng Cheong	(Chinese Taipei) Liu Chiao-yun (Chinese Taipei) Wang Yu-qiao	(England) Ethan van Leeuwen (England) Annie Lado
Santo Domingo Open	(Brazil) Jonathan Matias	(Brazil) Juliana Vieira	(Mexico) Job Castillo (Mexico) Luis Montoya	(Brazil) Sânia Lima (Brazil) Juliana Vieira	(Algeria) Koceila Mammeri (Algeria) Tanina Mammeri
Mauritius International	(India) Kartikey Gulshan Kumar	(Japan) Hina Akechi	(Japan) Shogo Ogawa (Japan) Daisuke Sano	(Japan) Natsumi Takasaki (Japan) Mai Tanabe	(India) Hariharan Amsakarunan (India) Varshini Viswanath Sri
Tajikistan International	(Vietnam) Lê Đức Phát	(India) Anupama Upadhyaya	(Kazakhstan) Khaitmurat Kulmatov (Kazakhstan) Makhsut Tadzhibullaev	(India) Rutaparna Panda (India) Swetaparna Panda	(Kazakhstan) Dmitriy Panarin (Kazakhstan) Kamila Smagulova
Brazil International	(Guatemala) Kevin Cordón	(Mauritius) Kate Ludik	(Algeria) Koceila Mammeri (Algeria) Youcef Sabri Medel	(Brazil) Jaqueline Lima (Brazil) Sâmia Lima	(Brazil) Davi Silva (Brazil) Sânia Lima
Maldives International	(Indonesia) Krishna Adi Nugraha	(Japan) Sorano Yoshikawa	(Malaysia) Choi Jian Sheng (Malaysia) Bryan Goonting	(Malaysia) Ho Lo Ee (Malaysia) Amanda Yap	(India) Sathish Kumar Karunakaran (India) Aadya Variyath
Paraguay International	Cancelled (Note: This tournament, originally to be played on 15–19 August, was later cancelled.)				
Cameroon International	(Norway) Markus Barth	(Azerbaijan) Keisha Fatimah Azzahra	(India) P.S Ravikrishna (India) Sankar Prasad Udayakumar	(India) Rutaparna Panda (India) Swetaparna Panda	(Algeria) Koceila Mammeri (Algeria) Tanina Mammeri
Trinidad and Tobago International	(United States) Mark Alcala	(Canada) Eliana Zhang	(United States) Ryan Ma (Canada) Daniel Zhou	(Canada) Jeslyn Chow (Canada) Eliana Zhang	(Jamaica) Samuel Ricketts (Jamaica) Tahlia Richardson
Thailand International	(Japan) Riki Takei	(Japan) Runa Kurihara	(Japan) Kazuki Shibata (Japan) Naoki Yamada	(South Korea) Kim Yu-jung (South Korea) Lee Yeon-woo	(South Korea) Park Kyung-hoon (South Korea) Kim Yu-jung
Polish International	(Indonesia) Andi Fadel Muhammad	(Japan) Sorano Yoshikawa	(England) Callum Hemming (England) Ethan van Leeuwen	(Turkey) Bengisu Erçetin (Turkey) Nazlıcan İnci	(England) Callum Hemming (England) Estelle van Leeuwen
Malaysia International	(Indonesia) Ikhsan Rumbay	(Singapore) Insyirah Khan	(Malaysia) Fazriq Razif (Malaysia) Wong Vin Sean	(Indonesia) Isyana Syahira Meida (Indonesia) Rinjani Kwinara Nastine	(Malaysia) Loo Bing Kun (Malaysia) Cheng Su Yin
Uganda International	(Mexico) Luis Ramón Garrido	(India) Meghana Reddy	(Uganda) Brian Kasirye (Uganda) Muzafaru Lubega	(India) Rutaparna Panda (India) Swetaparna Panda	(Algeria) Koceila Mammeri (Algeria) Tanina Mammeri
Venezuela International	(Italy) Giovanni Toti	(Peru) Inés Castillo	(Mexico) Job Castillo (Mexico) Luis Montoya	(Mexico) Romina Fregoso (Mexico) Miriam Rodríguez	(Mexico) Luis Montoya (Mexico) Miriam Rodríguez
Egypt International	(England) Harry Huang	(France) Romane Cloteaux-Foucault	(France) Louis Ducrot (France) Quentin Ronget	(Germany) Julia Meyer (Germany) Leona Michalski	(Germany) Jones Ralfy Jansen (Germany) Julia Meyer
Peru International	(Italy) Fabio Caponio	(Peru) Inés Castillo	(Spain) Rubén García (Spain) Carlos Piris	(Spain) Paula López (Spain) Lucía Rodríguez	(Spain) Jacobo Fernández (Spain) Paula López
Sydney International	(Chinese Taipei) Ting Yen-chen	(Singapore) Jaslyn Hooi	(Chinese Taipei) Chen Cheng-kuan (Chinese Taipei) Chen Sheng-fa	(Australia) Setyana Mapasa (Australia) Angela Yu	(Chinese Taipei) Chen Sheng-fa (Chinese Taipei) Lin Jhih-yun
Czech Open	(Czech Republic) Jan Louda	(Denmark) Frederikke Østergaard	(United States) Chen Zhi-yi (United States) Presley Smith	(France) Tea Margueritte (France) Flavie Vallet	(Sweden) Ludwig Axelsson (Sweden) Jessica Silvennoinen
Algeria International	(Azerbaijan) Ade Resky Dwicahyo	(France) Rosy Oktavia Pancasari	(Algeria) Koceila Mammeri (Algeria) Youcef Sabri Medel	(South Africa) Amy Ackerman (South Africa) Deidre Laurens	(Algeria) Koceila Mammeri (Algeria) Tanina Mammeri
Hungarian International	(England) Harry Huang	(Denmark) Frederikke Lund	(Denmark) Rasmus Espersen (Denmark) Marcus Rindshøj	(Spain) Paula López (Spain) Lucía Rodríguez	(Denmark) Rasmus Espersen (Denmark) Amalie Cecilie Kudsk
Vietnam International	(China) Liu Liang	(China) Wu Luoyu	(China) Xie Haonan (China) Zeng Weihan	(Japan) Kaho Osawa (Japan) Asuka Sugiyama	(China) Zhou Zhihong (China) Yang Jiayi
Norwegian International	(Indonesia) Andi Fadel Muhammad	(Canada) Talia Ng	(France) Mael Cattoen (France) Lucas Renoir	(Denmark) Amalie Cecilie Kudsk (Denmark) Signe Schulz	(Poland) Robert Cybulski (Poland) Kornelia Marczak
Guatemala International	(Guatemala) Kevin Cordón	(United States) Ishika Jaiswal	(Mexico) Job Castillo (Mexico) Luis Montoya	(Guatemala) Diana Corleto (Guatemala) Nikté Sotomayor	(Algeria) Koceila Mammeri (Algeria) Tanina Mammeri
Bahrain International	(China) Wang Zhengxing	(China) Chen Lu	(China) Xie Haonan (China) Zeng Weihan	(China) Wang Tingge (China) Wang Yiduo	(China) Ma Xixiang (China) Wu Mengying
Zambia International	(Mexico) Luis Ramón Garrido	(France) Malya Hoareau	(Algeria) Koceila Mammeri (Algeria) Youcef Sabri Medel	(South Africa) Amy Ackerman (South Africa) Deidre Laurens	(Algeria) Koceila Mammeri (Algeria) Tanina Mammeri
Suriname International	(El Salvador) Uriel Canjura	(Mexico) Haramara Gaitán	(Suriname) Sören Opti (Suriname) Mitchel Wongsodikromo	(Mexico) Haramara Gaitan (Mexico) Sabrina Solis	(Suriname) Mitchel Wongsodikromo (French Guiana) Loriane Dréan
Mexican International	(Guatemala) Kevin Cordón	(Canada) Talia Ng	(United States) Xu Zicheng (United States) Zhang Tianqi	(Mexico) Vanessa García (Mexico) Cecilia Madera	(Mexico) Luis Montoya (Mexico) Miriam Rodríguez
Slovenian International	Cancelled (Note: This tournament, originally to be played on 22–26 November, was later cancelled.)				
Kazakhstan International	(Canada) Xiaodong Sheng	(Philippines) Mikaela de Guzman	(India) Arryan R Aji (India) Syam Prasad Udayakumar	(Kazakhstan) Nargiza Rakhmetullayeva (Kazakhstan) Aisha Zhumabek	(Kazakhstan) Dmitriy Panarin (Kazakhstan) Kamila Smagulova

==== Future Series ====
Tour	Men's singles	Women's singles	Men's doubles	Women's doubles	Mixed doubles
Iceland International	(Germany) Matthias Kicklitz	(Denmark) Frederikke Lund	(Denmark) Jonas Kudsk (Denmark) Jeppe Søby	(England) Abbygael Harris (England) Annie Lado	(England) Brandon Yap (England) Annie Lado
Giraldilla International	(Indonesia) Muhammad Halim As Sidiq	(Bulgaria) Hristomira Popovska	(England) Kelvin Ho (Jamaica) Samuel Ricketts	(Cuba) Taymara Oropesa (Cuba) Yeily Ortiz	(Bulgaria) Iliyan Stoynov (Bulgaria) Hristomira Popovska
Kazakhstan Future Series	(Kazakhstan) Dmitriy Panarin	(India) Jiya Rawat	(Philippines) Solomon Padiz Jr. (Philippines) Julius Villabrille	(Indonesia) Nethania Irawan (Indonesia) Fuyu Iwasaki	(Israel) Maxim Grinblat (Israel) Anna Kirillova
Bonn International	(Chinese Taipei) Wang Po-wei	(Chinese Taipei) Hung Yi-ting	(Chinese Taipei) Chen Bo-yuan (Chinese Taipei) Lin Shang-kai	(Turkey) Bengisu Erçetin (Turkey) Nazlıcan İnci	(Germany) Malik Bourakkadi (Germany) Leona Michalski
Chile International	(Italy) Fabio Caponio	(Italy) Yasmine Hamza	(England) Kelvin Ho (Jamaica) Samuel Ricketts	(Peru) Estefania Canchanya (Peru) Valeria Chuquimaqui	(Jamaica) Samuel Ricketts (Jamaica) Tahlia Richardson
Lithuanian International	(Germany) Matthias Kicklitz	(Indonesia) Deswanti Hujansih Nurtertiati	(Indonesia) Putra Erwiansyah (Indonesia) Patra Harapan Rindorindo	(Estonia) Kati-Kreet Marran (Estonia) Helina Rüütel	(Indonesia) Marwan Faza (Indonesia) Jessica Maya Rismawardani
Perú Future Series	(Indonesia) Muhammad Sultan	(Peru) Inés Castillo	(England) Kelvin Ho (Jamaica) Samuel Ricketts	(Peru) Inés Castillo (Peru) Paula la Torre	(Peru) Diego Mini (Peru) Paula la Torre Regal
Guatemala Future Series	(Indonesia) Muhammad Sultan	(Japan) Tomoka Miyazaki	(Indonesia) Muhammad Halim As Sidiq (Indonesia) Muhammad Sultan	(Japan) Mei Sudo (Japan) Nao Yamakita	(Japan) Daigo Tanioka (Japan) Maya Taguchi
Future Series Nouvelle-Aquitaine	(India) Bharat Raghav	(Chinese Taipei) Tung Ciou-tong	(France) Éloi Adam (France) Léo Rossi	(Turkey) Bengisu Erçetin (Turkey) Nazlıcan İnci	(France) Éloi Adam (France) Sharone Bauer
Argentina Future Series	Cancelled (Note: This tournament, originally to be played on 2–6 August, was later cancelled.)				
Latvia International	(Croatia) Aria Dinata	(Denmark) Irina Amalie Andersen	(Germany) Marvin Datko (Germany) Jarne Schlevoigt	(Estonia) Kati-Kreet Marran (Estonia) Helina Rüütel	(France) Tom Lalot Trescarte (France) Elsa Jacob
Mexico Future Series	(Mexico) Luis Ramón Garrido	(Guatemala) Nikté Sotomayor	(Guatemala) José Granados (Guatemala) Antonio Ortíz	(Mexico) Romina Fregoso (Mexico) Miriam Rodríguez	(Mexico) Luis Montoya (Mexico) Miriam Rodríguez
Slovenia Future Series	(Denmark) Jakob Houe	(Israel) Heli Neiman	(Germany) Marvin Datko (Germany) Jarne Schlevoigt	(Italy) Martina Corsini (Sweden) Miranda Johansson	(Germany) Jarne Schlevoigt (Germany) Julia Meyer
Benin International	(Egypt) Adham Hatem Elgamal	(South Africa) Johanita Scholtz	(Nigeria) Ogunsanwo David Oluwasegun (Nigeria) Godwin Olofua	(Uganda) Husina Kobugabe (Uganda) Gladys Mbabazi	(Egypt) Adham Hatem Elgamal (Egypt) Doha Hany
Kampala International	(Uganda) Brian Kasirye	(France) Romane Cloteaux-Foucault	(Uganda) Brian Kasirye (Uganda) Muzafaru Lubega	(India) Rutaparna Panda (India) Swetaparna Panda	(United Arab Emirates) Kuswanto (United Arab Emirates) Sreeyuktha Sreejith Parol
Croatian International	(Israel) Daniil Dubovenko	(Switzerland) Milena Schnider	(Poland) Robert Cybulski (Poland) Szymon Slepecki	(Poland) Paulina Hankiewicz (Poland) Kornelia Marczak	(England) Samuel Jones (England) Sian Kelly
Bulgarian International	(Poland) Mikolaj Szymanowski	(Bulgaria) Kaloyana Nalbantova	(Poland) Robert Cybulski (Poland) Szymon Slepecki	(Poland) Paulina Hankiewicz (Poland) Kornelia Marczak	(Poland) Robert Cybulski (Poland) Kornelia Marczak
Israel Open	Cancelled (Note: This tournament, originally to be played on 26–28 October, was later cancelled due to the Gaza war.)				
Dominican Open	Cancelled (Note: This tournament, originally to be played on 24–27 October, was later cancelled.)				
Spanish International	(Denmark) Jakob Houe	(England) Leona Lee	(Spain) Rubén García (Spain) Carlos Piris	(Spain) Paula López (Spain) Lucía Rodríguez	(Spain) Rubén García (Spain) Lucía Rodríguez
Botswana International	(Mauritius) Julien Paul	(United Arab Emirates) Nurani Ratu Azzahra	(Malaysia) Keane Chok (Malaysia) Andy Kok	(South Africa) Amy Ackerman (South Africa) Deidre Laurens	(Mauritius) Julien Paul (Mauritius) Kate Ludik
South Africa International	(England) Nadeem Dalvi	(Mauritius) Kate Ludik	(South Africa) Caden Kakora (South Africa) Robert White	(South Africa) Amy Ackerman (South Africa) Deidre Laurens	(South Africa) Robert White (South Africa) Deidre Laurens
French Guiana International	(United States) Howard Shu	(Mauritius) Kate Ludik	(Suriname) Sören Opti (Suriname) Mitchel Wongsodikromo	no competition	(French Guiana) Peter Dirifo (French Guiana) Elize Nijean

== Statistics ==
=== Performance by countries ===
Below are the 2023 BWF Continental Circuit performances by country. Only countries who have won a title are listed:

==== International Challenge ====
Rank	Team	IRN	UGA	THA	VIE	POL	JPN	MEX	SLO	MDV	NMI	DEN	NMI2	FRA	CHN	MGL	REU	INA	NGR	GUA	BEL	PER	SCO	AUS	NED	INA2	IND	IND2	MAS	IRL	BHR	WAL	ESA	CAN	Total
1	Japan			2	1		3	2					2			1	1				1	2		1		2	1		3		2				24
2	India	1	1						1	2		1		1			1		2	1							3	3							17
3	Chinese Taipei			1					2		3	2	2											2					1	1					14
4	Denmark					2		1	1			1		1							1		3		2					1					13
5	Thailand		1	2						2								1								1	1	2							10
6	Canada																			3		2											1	3.5	9.5
6	Malaysia	1	2						1	1				1		1										1			1					0.5	9.5
8	Indonesia	2			1									1				4																1	9
9	China														5																2				7
9	South Korea				2		2				2															1									7
11	France					1								1			2				1											1			6
12	Singapore		1			2																		1						1					5
12	United States							1					1									1											2		5
14	Brazil																		1	1													1		3
14	Bulgaria																						1								1	1			3
14	England																				1				2										3
17	Australia															1								1											2
17	Hong Kong															2																			2
17	Peru																		2																2
17	Turkey																				1		1												2
17	Scotland																													1		1			2
22	Algeria																1																		1
22	Czech Republic							1																											1
22	Estonia											1																							1
22	Finland																															1			1
22	Germany																															1			1
22	Guatemala																																1		1
22	Ireland																													1					1
22	Netherlands																								1										1
22	Philippines	1																																	1
22	Vietnam				1																														1

==== International Series ====
Rank	Team	EST	POR	NED	LUX	SWE	AUT	DOM	MRI	TJK	BRA	MDV	CMR	TRI	THA	POL	MAS	VEN	UGA	PER	EGY	AUS	ALG	CZE	HUN	VIE	NOR	GUA	BHR	SUR	ZAM	MEX	KAZ	Total
1	Japan	2		1	1	2			3			1			3	1										1								15
2	India				1				2	2		1	2						2														1	11
2	Mexico							1										3	1									1		2	1	2		11
4	Algeria							1			1		1						1				2					1			2			9
4	China																									4			5					9
4	Denmark	1	1		1	1																		1	3		1							9
7	Chinese Taipei	1		2			2															3												8
8	Indonesia					2						1				1	2										1							7
8	France		1																		2		1	1			1				1			7
10	England		1				1									2					1				1									6
11	Canada													2.5													1					1	1	5.5
11	United States	1												1.5										1				1				1		5.5
13	Brazil							3			2																							5
13	Malaysia						1					2					2																	5
15	Guatemala										1																	2				1		4
15	Kazakhstan									2																							2	4
15	Spain																			3					1									4
18	Germany				1																2													3
18	Turkey		2													1																		3
20	Australia			1																		1												2
20	Azerbaijan												1										1											2
20	Belgium			1			1																											2
20	Italy																	1		1														2
20	Peru																	1		1														2
20	Singapore																1					1												2
20	South Africa																						1								1			2
20	South Korea														2																			2
28	Suriname																													1.5				1.5
29	Czech Republic																							1										1
29	El Salvador																													1				1
29	Jamaica													1																				1
29	Mauritius										1																							1
29	Netherlands				1																													1
29	Norway												1																					1
29	Philippines																																1	1
29	Poland																										1							1
29	Sweden																							1										1
29	Uganda																		1															1
29	Vietnam									1																								1
40	French Guiana									1																				0.5				0.5

==== Future Series ====
Rank	Team	ISL	CUB	KAZ	GER	CHI	LTU	PER	GUA	FRA	LAT	MEX	SVN	BEN	UGA	CRO	BUL	ESP	BOT	RSA	GUF	Total
1	Indonesia		1	1			3	1	2													8
2	England	2	0.5			0.5		0.5								1		1		1		6.5
3	Germany	1			1		1				1		2									6
3	Poland															2	4					6
5	Denmark	2									1		1					1				5
5	South Africa													1					1	3		5
7	Chinese Taipei				3					1												4
7	France									2	1				1							4
7	Mauritius																		2	1	1	4
7	Peru					1		3														4
11	Bulgaria		2														1					3
11	India			1						1					1							3
11	Israel			1									1			1						3
11	Japan								3													3
11	Mexico											3										3
11	Spain																	3				3
11	Uganda													1	2							3
18	Italy					2							0.5									2.5
18	Jamaica		0.5			1.5		0.5														2.5
20	Egypt													2								2
20	Estonia						1				1											2
20	Guatemala											2										2
20	Turkey				1					1												2
20	United Arab Emirates														1				1			2
25	Croatia										1											1
25	Cuba		1																			1
25	French Guiana																				1	1
25	Kazakhstan			1																		1
25	Malaysia																		1			1
25	Nigeria													1								1
25	Philippines			1																		1
25	Suriname																				1	1
25	Switzerland															1						1
25	United States																				1	1
35	Sweden												0.5									0.5

=== Performance by categories ===
These tables were calculated after the finals of the French Guiana International.

==== Men's singles ====
Rank	Player	IC	IS	FS	Total
1	(Guatemala) Kevin Cordón	1	3		4
2	(Japan) Minoru Koga	3			3
3	(Mexico) Luis Ramón Garrido		2	1	3
4	(France) Arnaud Merklé	2			2
4	(India) Sathish Kumar Karunakaran	2			2
4	(Japan) Takuma Obayashi	2			2
7	(Brazil) Jonathan Matias	1	1		2
7	(Czech Republic) Jan Louda	1	1		2
7	(Denmark) Victor Svendsen	1	1		2
7	(Japan) Yushi Tanaka	1	1		2
11	(Belgium) Julien Carraggi		2		2
11	(England) Harry Huang		2		2
11	(Indonesia) Andi Fadel Muhammad		2		2
14	(Italy) Fabio Caponio		1	1	2
15	(Denmark) Jakob Houe			2	2
15	(Germany) Matthias Kicklitz			2	2
15	(Indonesia) Muhammad Sultan			2	2
18	(Brazil) Ygor Coelho	1			1
18	(Canada) Brian Yang	1			1
18	(China) Lei Lanxi	1			1
18	(Chinese Taipei) Huang Yu-kai	1			1
18	(Chinese Taipei) Liao Jhuo-fu	1			1
18	(Denmark) Mads Christophersen	1			1
18	(Finland) Joakim Oldorff	1			1
18	(France) Lucas Claerbout	1			1
18	(France) Alex Lanier	1			1
18	(Hong Kong) Chan Yin Chak	1			1
18	(India) Ravi	1			1
18	(India) Sameer Verma	1			1
18	(Indonesia) Syabda Perkasa Belawa	1			1
18	(Indonesia) Alwi Farhan	1			1
18	(Japan) Takuma Kawamoto	1			1
18	(Japan) Keita Makino	1			1
18	(Malaysia) Justin Hoh	1			1
18	(Malaysia) Aidil Sholeh	1			1
18	(Republic of Ireland) Nhat Nguyen	1			1
37	(Azerbaijan) Ade Resky Dwicahyo		1		1
37	(Canada) Xiaodong Sheng		1		1
37	(China) Liu Liang		1		1
37	(China) Wang Zhengxing		1		1
37	(Chinese Taipei) Ting Yen-chen		1		1
37	(El Salvador) Uriel Canjura		1		1
37	(England) Johnnie Torjussen		1		1
37	(India) Kartikey Gulshan Kumar		1		1
37	(India) Sankar Subramanian		1		1
37	(Indonesia) Krishna Adi Nugraha		1		1
37	(Indonesia) Ikhsan Rumbay		1		1
37	(Italy) Giovanni Toti		1		1
37	(Japan) Riki Takei		1		1
37	(Norway) Markus Barth		1		1
37	(United States) Mark Alcala		1		1
37	(Vietnam) Lê Đức Phát		1		1
53	(Chinese Taipei) Wang Po-wei			1	1
53	(Croatia) Aria Dinata			1	1
53	(Egypt) Adham Hatem Elgamal			1	1
53	(England) Nadeem Dalvi			1	1
53	(India) Bharat Raghav			1	1
53	(Indonesia) Muhammad Halim As Sidiq			1	1
53	(Israel) Daniil Dubovenko			1	1
53	(Kazakhstan) Dmitriy Panarin			1	1
53	(Mauritius) Julien Paul			1	1
53	(Poland) Mikolaj Szymanowski			1	1
53	(Uganda) Brian Kasirye			1	1
53	(United States) Howard Shu			1	1

==== Women's singles ====
Rank	Player	IC	IS	FS	Total
1	(Japan) Hina Akechi	1	3		4
2	(Peru) Inés Castillo	1	2	1	4
3	(China) Chen Lu	2	1		3
3	(Turkey) Neslihan Arın	2	1		3
5	(Chinese Taipei) Huang Yu-hsun	1	2		3
6	(Mauritius) Kate Ludik		1	2	3
7	(Brazil) Juliana Vieira	1	1		2
7	(France) Rosy Oktavia Pancasari	1	1		2
7	(Singapore) Jaslyn Hooi	1	1		2
10	(Japan) Tomoka Miyazaki	1		1	2
11	(Canada) Talia Ng		2		2
11	(Japan) Sorano Yoshikawa		2		2
13	(Denmark) Frederikke Lund		1	1	2
13	(France) Romane Cloteaux-Foucault		1	1	2
15	(Canada) Wenyu Zhang	1			1
15	(Chinese Taipei) Yang Yu-chi	1			1
15	(Denmark) Julie Dawall Jakobsen	1			1
15	(Estonia) Kristin Kuuba	1			1
15	(India) Isharani Baruah	1			1
15	(India) Ashmita Chaliha	1			1
15	(India) Samiya Imad Farooqui	1			1
15	(India) Tanya Hemanth	1			1
15	(India) Unnati Hooda	1			1
15	(Indonesia) Komang Ayu Cahya Dewi	1			1
15	(Indonesia) Ester Nurumi Tri Wardoyo	1			1
15	(Japan) Miho Kayama	1			1
15	(Japan) Akari Kurihara	1			1
15	(Japan) Shiori Saito	1			1
15	(Japan) Kaoru Sugiyama	1			1
15	(Japan) Manami Suizu	1			1
15	(Japan) Asuka Takahashi	1			1
15	(Malaysia) Letshanaa Karupathevan	1			1
15	(Singapore) Yeo Jia Min	1			1
15	(South Korea) Kim Ga-ram	1			1
15	(South Korea) Sim Yu-jin	1			1
15	(Vietnam) Nguyễn Thùy Linh	1			1
37	(Azerbaijan) Keisha Fatimah Azzahra		1		1
37	(Canada) Eliana Zhang		1		1
37	(China) Wu Luoyu		1		1
37	(Chinese Taipei) Wang Yu-si		1		1
37	(Denmark) Frederikke Østergaard		1		1
37	(France) Malya Hoareau		1		1
37	(India) Meghana Reddy		1		1
37	(India) Anupama Upadhyaya		1		1
37	(Japan) Runa Kurihara		1		1
37	(Mexico) Haramara Gaitán		1		1
37	(Philippines) Mikaela de Guzman		1		1
37	(Singapore) Insyirah Khan		1		1
37	(United States) Ishika Jaiswal		1		1
50	(Bulgaria) Kaloyana Nalbantova			1	1
50	(Bulgaria) Hristomira Popovska			1	1
50	(Chinese Taipei) Hung Yi-ting			1	1
50	(Chinese Taipei) Tung Ciou-tong			1	1
50	(Denmark) Irina Amalie Andersen			1	1
50	(England) Leona Lee			1	1
50	(Guatemala) Nikté Sotomayor			1	1
50	(India) Jiya Rawat			1	1
50	(Indonesia) Deswanti Hujansih Nurtertiati			1	1
50	(Israel) Heli Neiman			1	1
50	(Italy) Yasmine Hamza			1	1
50	(South Africa) Johanita Scholtz			1	1
50	(Switzerland) Milena Schnider			1	1
50	(United Arab Emirates) Nurani Ratu Azzahra			1	1

==== Men's doubles ====
Rank	Players	IC	IS	FS	Total
1	(Canada) Kevin Lee	3			3
1	(Canada) Ty Alexander Lindeman	3			3
1	(Denmark) Daniel Lundgaard	3			3
1	(Denmark) Mads Vestergaard	3			3
5	(Malaysia) Low Hang Yee	2	1		3
5	(Malaysia) Ng Eng Cheong	2	1		3
7	(Algeria) Koceila Mammeri		3		3
7	(Algeria) Youcef Sabri Medel		3		3
7	(Mexico) Job Castillo		3		3
7	(Mexico) Luis Montoya		3		3
11	(England) Kelvin Ho			3	3
11	(Jamaica) Samuel Ricketts			3	3
13	(Scotland) Christopher Grimley	2			2
13	(Scotland) Matthew Grimley	2			2
13	(Thailand) Chaloempon Charoenkitamorn	2			2
16	(Chinese Taipei) Chen Cheng-kuan	1	1		2
16	(Chinese Taipei) Chen Sheng-fa	1	1		2
16	(India) P.S Ravikrishna	1	1		2
16	(India) Sankar Prasad Udayakumar	1	1		2
16	(Japan) Kazuki Shibata	1	1		2
16	(Japan) Naoki Yamada	1	1		2
22	(China) Xie Haonan		2		2
22	(China) Zeng Weihan		2		2
24	(Spain) Rubén García		1	1	2
24	(Spain) Carlos Piris		1	1	2
24	(Uganda) Brian Kasirye		1	1	2
24	(Uganda) Muzafaru Lubega		1	1	2
24	(Suriname) Sören Opti		1	1	2
24	(Suriname) Mitchel Wongsodikromo		1	1	2
30	(Germany) Marvin Datko			2	2
30	(Germany) Jarne Schlevoigt			2	2
30	(Poland) Robert Cybulski			2	2
30	(Poland) Szymon Slepecki			2	2
34	(Canada) Jonathan Lai	1			1
34	(China) Chen Xujun	1			1
34	(China) Peng Jianqin	1			1
34	(Chinese Taipei) Lee Fang-chih	1			1
34	(Chinese Taipei) Lee Fang-jen	1			1
34	(Chinese Taipei) Wei Chun-wei	1			1
34	(Chinese Taipei) Wu Guan-xun	1			1
34	(Denmark) Rasmus Kjær	1			1
34	(Denmark) Frederik Søgaard	1			1
34	(Denmark) Andreas Søndergaard	1			1
34	(Denmark) Jesper Toft	1			1
34	(England) Rory Easton	1			1
34	(England) Zach Russ	1			1
34	(India) Hariharan Amsakarunan	1			1
34	(India) Krishna Prasad Garaga	1			1
34	(India) Vishnuvardhan Goud Panjala	1			1
34	(India) Ruban Kumar Rethinasabapathi	1			1
34	(Indonesia) Berry Angriawan	1			1
34	(Indonesia) Rian Agung Saputro	1			1
34	(Japan) Takuto Inoue	1			1
34	(Japan) Hiroki Midorikawa	1			1
34	(Japan) Kenya Mitsuhashi	1			1
34	(Japan) Hiroki Okamura	1			1
34	(Japan) Masayuki Onodera	1			1
34	(Japan) Kyohei Yamashita	1			1
34	(Malaysia) Junaidi Arif	1			1
34	(Malaysia) Mohamad Arif Abdul Latif	1			1
34	(Malaysia) Yap Roy King	1			1
34	(Philippines) Christian Bernardo	1			1
34	(Philippines) Alvin Morada	1			1
34	(South Korea) Jin Yong	1			1
34	(South Korea) Na Sung-seung	1			1
34	(Thailand) Pharanyu Kaosamaang	1			1
34	(Thailand) Thanawin Madee	1			1
34	(Thailand) Pongsakorn Thongkham	1			1
34	(Thailand) Wongsathorn Thongkham	1			1
34	(Thailand) Worrapol Thongsa-nga	1			1
34	(Thailand) Nanthakarn Yordphaisong	1			1
72	(Canada) Daniel Zhou		1		1
72	(Denmark) William Kryger Boe		1		1
72	(Denmark) Rasmus Espersen		1		1
72	(Denmark) Christian Faust Kjaer		1		1
72	(Denmark) Marcus Rindshøj		1		1
72	(England) Callum Hemming		1		1
72	(England) Ethan van Leeuwen		1		1
72	(France) Mael Cattoen		1		1
72	(France) Louis Ducrot		1		1
72	(France) Julien Maio		1		1
72	(France) Lucas Renoir		1		1
72	(France) Quentin Ronget		1		1
72	(France) William Villeger		1		1
72	(India) Arryan R Aji		1		1
72	(India) Syam Prasad Udayakumar		1		1
72	(Indonesia) Raymond Indra		1		1
72	(Indonesia) Daniel Edgar Marvino		1		1
72	(Japan) Kazuhiro Ichikawa		1		1
72	(Japan) Shuntaro Mezaki		1		1
72	(Japan) Haruya Nishida		1		1
72	(Japan) Shogo Ogawa		1		1
72	(Japan) Daisuke Sano		1		1
72	(Japan) Daiki Umayahara		1		1
72	(Kazakhstan) Khaitmurat Kulmatov		1		1
72	(Kazakhstan) Makhsut Tadzhibullaev		1		1
72	(Malaysia) Choi Jian Sheng		1		1
72	(Malaysia) Bryan Goonting		1		1
72	(Malaysia) Fazriq Razif		1		1
72	(Malaysia) Wong Vin Sean		1		1
72	(United States) Chen Zhi-yi		1		1
72	(United States) Ryan Ma		1		1
72	(United States) Presley Smith		1		1
72	(United States) Xu Zicheng		1		1
72	(United States) Zhang Tianqi		1		1
106	(Chinese Taipei) Chen Bo-yuan			1	1
106	(Chinese Taipei) Lin Shang-kai			1	1
106	(Denmark) Jonas Kudsk			1	1
106	(Denmark) Jeppe Søby			1	1
106	(France) Éloi Adam			1	1
106	(France) Léo Rossi			1	1
106	(Guatemala) José Granados			1	1
106	(Guatemala) Antonio Ortíz			1	1
106	(Indonesia) Muhammad Halim As Sidiq			1	1
106	(Indonesia) Putra Erwiansyah			1	1
106	(Indonesia) Muhammad Sultan			1	1
106	(Indonesia) Patra Harapan Rindorindo			1	1
106	(Malaysia) Keane Chok			1	1
106	(Malaysia) Andy Kok			1	1
106	(Nigeria) Godwin Olofua			1	1
106	(Nigeria) Ogunsanwo David Oluwasegun			1	1
106	(Philippines) Solomon Padiz Jr.			1	1
106	(Philippines) Julius Villabrille			1	1
106	(South Africa) Caden Kakora			1	1
106	(South Africa) Robert White			1	1

==== Women's doubles ====
Rank	Players	IC	IS	FS	Total
1	(India) Rutaparna Panda		3	1	4
1	(India) Swetaparna Panda		3	1	4
3	(South Africa) Amy Ackerman		2	2	4
3	(South Africa) Deidre Laurens		2	2	4
3	(Turkey) Bengisu Erçetin		2	2	4
3	(Turkey) Nazlıcan İnci		2	2	4
7	(Bulgaria) Gabriela Stoeva	3			3
7	(Bulgaria) Stefani Stoeva	3			3
9	(Chinese Taipei) Liu Chiao-yun	2	1		3
9	(Chinese Taipei) Wang Yu-qiao	2	1		3
11	(Spain) Paula López		2	1	3
11	(Spain) Lucía Rodríguez		2	1	3
13	(Chinese Taipei) Hsu Ya-ching	2			2
13	(Chinese Taipei) Lin Wan-ching	2			2
13	(Indonesia) Jesita Putri Miantoro	2			2
13	(Indonesia) Febi Setianingrum	2			2
13	(South Korea) Lee Yu-lim	2			2
13	(South Korea) Shin Seung-chan	2			2
13	(Thailand) Laksika Kanlaha	2			2
13	(Thailand) Phataimas Muenwong	2			2
21	(Australia) Setyana Mapasa	1	1		2
21	(Australia) Angela Yu	1	1		2
21	(Japan) Maiko Kawazoe	1	1		2
24	(Mexico) Romina Fregoso		1	1	2
24	(Mexico) Miriam Rodríguez		1	1	2
26	(Estonia) Kati-Kreet Marran			2	2
26	(Estonia) Helina Rüütel			2	2
26	(Poland) Paulina Hankiewicz			2	2
26	(Poland) Kornelia Marczak			2	2
30	(Canada) Jacqueline Cheung	1			1
30	(Canada) Catherine Choi	1			1
30	(Canada) Rachel Honderich	1			1
30	(Canada) Josephine Wu	1			1
30	(China) Xia Yuting	1			1
30	(China) Zhou Xinru	1			1
30	(Chinese Taipei) Hsieh Pei-shan	1			1
30	(Chinese Taipei) Lin Chih-chun	1			1
30	(Chinese Taipei) Sung Yu-hsuan	1			1
30	(Chinese Taipei) Tseng Yu-chi	1			1
30	(Denmark) Maiken Fruergaard	1			1
30	(Denmark) Sara Thygesen	1			1
30	(France) Margot Lambert	1			1
30	(France) Anne Tran	1			1
30	(Hong Kong) Lui Lok Lok	1			1
30	(Hong Kong) Ng Wing Yung	1			1
30	(India) Tanisha Crasto	1			1
30	(India) Trisha Hegde	1			1
30	(India) Ashwini Ponnappa	1			1
30	(India) Simran Singhi	1			1
30	(India) Ritika Thaker	1			1
30	(India) Khushi Thakkar	1			1
30	(Japan) Sayaka Hobara	1			1
30	(Japan) Haruna Konishi	1			1
30	(Japan) Miku Shigeta	1			1
30	(Japan) Yui Suizu	1			1
30	(Japan) Maya Taguchi	1			1
30	(Netherlands) Debora Jille	1			1
30	(Netherlands) Cheryl Seinen	1			1
30	(Singapore) Jin Yujia	1			1
30	(Singapore) Crystal Wong	1			1
30	(Thailand) Tidapron Kleebyeesun	1			1
30	(Thailand) Nattamon Laisuan	1			1
30	(United States) Francesca Corbett	1			1
30	(United States) Allison Lee	1			1
30	(United States) Annie Xu	1			1
30	(United States) Kerry Xu	1			1
67	(Brazil) Jaqueline Lima		1		1
67	(Brazil) Sâmia Lima		1		1
67	(Brazil) Sânia Lima		1		1
67	(Brazil) Juliana Viana Vieira		1		1
67	(Canada) Jeslyn Chow		1		1
67	(Canada) Eliana Zhang		1		1
67	(China) Wang Tingge		1		1
67	(China) Wang Yiduo		1		1
67	(Chinese Taipei) Hsu Yin-hui		1		1
67	(Chinese Taipei) Lee Chih-chen		1		1
67	(Denmark) Amalie Cecilie Kudsk		1		1
67	(Denmark) Signe Schulz		1		1
67	(France) Tea Margueritte		1		1
67	(France) Flavie Vallet		1		1
67	(Germany) Julia Meyer		1		1
67	(Germany) Leona Michalski		1		1
67	(Guatemala) Diana Corleto		1		1
67	(Guatemala) Nikté Sotomayor		1		1
67	(Indonesia) Isyana Syahira Meida		1		1
67	(Indonesia) Rinjani Kwinara Nastine		1		1
67	(Japan) Kaho Osawa		1		1
67	(Japan) Asuka Sugiyama		1		1
67	(Japan) Natsumi Takasaki		1		1
67	(Japan) Mai Tanabe		1		1
67	(Japan) Sorano Yoshikawa		1		1
67	(Kazakhstan) Nargiza Rakhmetullayeva		1		1
67	(Kazakhstan) Aisha Zhumabek		1		1
67	(Malaysia) Ho Lo Ee		1		1
67	(Malaysia) Amanda Yap		1		1
67	(Mexico) Haramara Gaitan		1		1
67	(Mexico) Vanessa García		1		1
67	(Mexico) Cecilia Madera		1		1
67	(Mexico) Sabrina Solis		1		1
67	(Netherlands) Kirsten de Wit		1		1
67	(Netherlands) Alyssa Tirtosentono		1		1
67	(South Korea) Kim Yu-jung		1		1
67	(South Korea) Lee Yeon-woo		1		1
67	(United States) Paula Lynn Cao Hok		1		1
67	(United States) Lauren Lam		1		1
106	(Cuba) Taymara Oropesa			1	1
106	(Cuba) Yeily Ortiz			1	1
106	(England) Abbygael Harris			1	1
106	(England) Annie Lado			1	1
106	(Indonesia) Nethania Irawan			1	1
106	(Indonesia) Fuyu Iwasaki			1	1
106	(Italy) Martina Corsini			1	1
106	(Japan) Mei Sudo			1	1
106	(Japan) Nao Yamakita			1	1
106	(Peru) Estefania Canchanya			1	1
106	(Peru) Inés Castillo			1	1
106	(Peru) Valeria Chuquimaqui			1	1
106	(Peru) Paula la Torre			1	1
106	(Sweden) Miranda Johansson			1	1
106	(Uganda) Husina Kobugabe			1	1
106	(Uganda) Gladys Mbabazi			1	1

==== Mixed doubles ====
Rank	Players	IC	IS	FS	Total
1	(Algeria) Koceila Mammeri	1	6		7
1	(Algeria) Tanina Mammeri	1	6		7
3	(Denmark) Christine Busch	3	1		4
3	(Denmark) Mads Vestergaard	3	1		4
5	(Mexico) Luis Montoya		2	1	3
5	(Mexico) Miriam Rodríguez		2	1	3
7	(Canada) Ty Alexander Lindeman	2			2
7	(Canada) Josephine Wu	2			2
7	(Malaysia) Hoo Pang Ron	2			2
7	(South Korea) Shin Seung-chan	2			2
7	(South Korea) Wang Chan	2			2
7	(United States) Allison Lee	2			2
7	(United States) Presley Smith	2			2
14	(Australia) Kenneth Choo	1	1		2
14	(Australia) Gronya Somerville	1	1		2
14	(China) Yang Jiayi	1	1		2
14	(China) Zhou Zhihong	1	1		2
14	(Chinese Taipei) Chen Sheng-fa	1	1		2
14	(Chinese Taipei) Lin Jhih-yun	1	1		2
14	(England) Callum Hemming	1	1		2
14	(England) Estelle van Leeuwen	1	1		2
14	(India) Sathish Kumar Karunakaran	1	1		2
14	(India) Aadya Variyath	1	1		2
14	(Indonesia) Jafar Hidayatullah	1	1		2
14	(Indonesia) Aisyah Salsabila Putri Pranata	1	1		2
14	(Malaysia) Cheng Su Yin	1	1		2
27	(Kazakhstan) Dmitriy Panarin		2		2
27	(Kazakhstan) Kamila Smagulova		2		2
29	(England) Annie Lado		1	1	2
29	(Germany) Julia Meyer		1	1	2
29	(Jamaica) Tahlia Richardson		1	1	2
29	(Jamaica) Samuel Ricketts		1	1	2
29	(Poland) Robert Cybulski		1	1	2
29	(Poland) Kornelia Marczak		1	1	2
35	(China) Chen Fanghui	1			1
35	(China) Cheng Xing	1			1
35	(Denmark) Clara Graversen	1			1
35	(Denmark) Jesper Toft	1			1
35	(England) Marcus Ellis	1			1
35	(England) Lauren Smith	1			1
35	(Germany) Jan Colin Völker	1			1
35	(Germany) Stine Küspert	1			1
35	(India) Rohan Kapoor	1			1
35	(India) N. Sikki Reddy	1			1
35	(Indonesia) Serena Kani	1			1
35	(Indonesia) Rian Agung Saputro	1			1
35	(Japan) Hiroki Nishi	1			1
35	(Japan) Akari Sato	1			1
35	(Malaysia) Chen Tang Jie	1			1
35	(Malaysia) Toh Ee Wei	1			1
35	(Malaysia) Teoh Mei Xing	1			1
35	(Peru) Inés Castillo	1			1
35	(Peru) José Guevara	1			1
35	(Singapore) Terry Hee	1			1
35	(Singapore) Andy Kwek	1			1
35	(Singapore) Jessica Tan	1			1
35	(Singapore) Crystal Wong	1			1
35	(Thailand) Ornnicha Jongsathapornparn	1			1
35	(Thailand) Nattamon Laisuan	1			1
35	(Thailand) Phatharathorn Nipornram	1			1
35	(Thailand) Ruttanapak Oupthong	1			1
35	(Thailand) Weeraphat Phakjarung	1			1
35	(Thailand) Jhenicha Sudjaipraparat	1			1
35	(United States) Vinson Chiu	1			1
35	(United States) Jennie Gai	1			1
66	(Brazil) Sânia Lima		1		1
66	(Brazil) Davi Silva		1		1
66	(China) Ma Xixiang		1		1
66	(China) Wu Mengying		1		1
66	(Denmark) Iben Bergstein		1		1
66	(Denmark) Rasmus Espersen		1		1
66	(Denmark) Amalie Cecilie Kudsk		1		1
66	(Denmark) Andreas Søndergaard		1		1
66	(England) Ethan van Leeuwen		1		1
66	(French Guiana) Loriane Dréan		1		1
66	(Germany) Jones Ralfy Jansen		1		1
66	(Germany) Patrick Scheiel		1		1
66	(Germany) Franziska Volkmann		1		1
66	(India) Hariharan Amsakarunan		1		1
66	(India) Varshini Viswanath Sri		1		1
66	(Malaysia) Loo Bing Kun		1		1
66	(South Korea) Kim Yu-jung		1		1
66	(South Korea) Park Kyung-hoon		1		1
66	(Spain) Jacobo Fernández		1		1
66	(Spain) Paula López		1		1
66	(Suriname) Mitchel Wongsodikromo		1		1
66	(Sweden) Ludwig Axelsson		1		1
66	(Sweden) Jessica Silvennoinen		1		1
89	(Bulgaria) Hristomira Popovska			1	1
89	(Bulgaria) Iliyan Stoynov			1	1
89	(Egypt) Adham Hatem Elgamal			1	1
89	(Egypt) Doha Hany			1	1
89	(England) Samuel Jones			1	1
89	(England) Sian Kelly			1	1
89	(England) Brandon Yap			1	1
89	(France) Éloi Adam			1	1
89	(France) Sharone Bauer			1	1
89	(France) Elsa Jacob			1	1
89	(France) Tom Lalot Trescarte			1	1
89	(French Guiana) Peter Dirifo			1	1
89	(French Guiana) Elize Nijean			1	1
89	(Germany) Malik Bourakkadi			1	1
89	(Germany) Leona Michalski			1	1
89	(Germany) Jarne Schlevoigt			1	1
89	(Indonesia) Marwan Faza			1	1
89	(Indonesia) Jessica Maya Rismawardani			1	1
89	(Israel) Maxim Grinblat			1	1
89	(Israel) Anna Kirillova			1	1
89	(Japan) Maya Taguchi			1	1
89	(Japan) Daigo Tanioka			1	1
89	(Mauritius) Kate Ludik			1	1
89	(Mauritius) Julien Paul			1	1
89	(Peru) Paula la Torre			1	1
89	(Peru) Diego Mini			1	1
89	(South Africa) Deidre Laurens			1	1
89	(South Africa) Robert White			1	1
89	(Spain) Rubén García			1	1
89	(Spain) Lucía Rodríguez			1	1
89	(United Arab Emirates) Kuswanto			1	1
89	(United Arab Emirates) Sreeyuktha Sreejith Parol			1	1
