= 2024 BWF Continental Circuit =

Tournament details
- Dates: 11 January – 26 December
- Edition: 18th

The 2024 BWF Continental Circuit were Grade 3 badminton tournaments in 2024 organized by each continental confederation under the auspices of the BWF. The circuit consisted of 78 tournaments, which were divided into three levels:

- International Challenge (32 tournaments)
- International Series (27 tournaments)
- Future Series (19 tournaments).

Each of these tournaments offered different ranking points and prize money.

== Points distribution ==
Below is the point distribution table for each phase of the tournament based on the BWF points system for the BWF Continental Circuit events.

Tournament	Winner	Runner-up	3/4	5/8	9/16	17/32	33/64	65/128	129/256
International Challenge	4,000	3,400	2,800	2,200	1,520	920	360	170	70
International Series	2,500	2,130	1,750	1,370	920	550	210	100	40
Future Series	1,700	1,420	1,170	920	600	350	130	60	20

== Results ==
Below is the schedule released by Badminton World Federation:

=== Winners ===
==== International Challenge ====
Tour	Men's singles	Women's singles	Men's doubles	Women's doubles	Mixed doubles
Iran Fajr International	(Vietnam) Nguyễn Hải Đăng	(Hong Kong) Lo Sin Yan	(India) Krishna Prasad Garaga (India) K. Sai Pratheek	(Brazil) Jaqueline Lima (Brazil) Sâmia Lima	(India) Sathish Karunakaran (India) Aadya Variyath
Sri Lanka International	(India) Kartikey Gulshan Kumar	(India) Isharani Baruah	(Indonesia) Rahmat Hidayat (Indonesia) Yeremia Rambitan	(Thailand) Pichamon Phatcharaphisutsin (Thailand) Nannapas Sukklad	(India) Ashith Surya (India) Amrutha Pramuthesh
Azerbaijan International	(South Korea) Jeon Hyeok-jin	(India) Malvika Bansod	(Czech Republic) Ondřej Král (Czech Republic) Adam Mendrek	(Bulgaria) Gabriela Stoeva (Bulgaria) Stefani Stoeva	(India) Sathish Karunakaran (India) Aadya Variyath
Uganda International	(Vietnam) Lê Đức Phát	(India) Aakarshi Kashyap	(India) Arjun M. R. (India) Dhruv Kapila	(United States) Paula Lynn Cao Hok (United States) Lauren Lam	(India) Sathish Karunakaran (India) Aadya Variyath
Vietnam International	(Chinese Taipei) Huang Ping-hsien	(South Korea) Sim Yu-jin	(Chinese Taipei) Chiu Hsiang-chieh (Chinese Taipei) Liu Kuang-heng	(Thailand) Laksika Kanlaha (Thailand) Phataimas Muenwong	(Thailand) Pakkapon Teeraratsakul (Thailand) Phataimas Muenwong
Polish Open	(Denmark) Victor Ørding Kauffmann	(India) Anupama Upadhyaya	(India) Arjun M. R. (India) Dhruv Kapila	(Chinese Taipei) Hsu Yin-hui (Chinese Taipei) Lin Jhih-yun	(Canada) Ty Alexander Lindeman (Canada) Josephine Wu
Thailand International	(Thailand) Panitchaphon Teeraratsakul	(Japan) Riko Gunji	(Malaysia) Kang Khai Xing (Malaysia) Aaron Tai	(Thailand) Laksika Kanlaha (Thailand) Phataimas Muenwong	(Thailand) Pakkapon Teeraratsakul (Thailand) Phataimas Muenwong
Kazakhstan International	(India) Tharun Mannepalli	(India) Anupama Upadhyaya	(France) Lucas Corvée (France) Ronan Labar	(Japan) Kaho Osawa (Japan) Mai Tanabe	(Malaysia) Wong Tien Ci (Malaysia) Lim Chiew Sien
Osaka International	Cancelled				
Mexican International	(Japan) Ryoma Muramoto	(United States) Ishika Jaiswal	(Japan) Seiya Inoue (Japan) Haruki Kawabe	(Ukraine) Polina Buhrova (Ukraine) Yevheniia Kantemyr	(Mexico) Luis Montoya (Mexico) Miriam Rodríguez
Luxembourg Open	(France) Alex Lanier	(Japan) Hina Akechi	(Denmark) William Kryger Boe (Denmark) Christian Faust Kjær	(Japan) Miki Kanehiro (Japan) Rui Kiyama	(France) Grégoire Deschamp (Denmark) Iben Bergstein
Denmark Challenge	(Japan) Yushi Tanaka	(Japan) Riko Gunji	(Denmark) William Kryger Boe (Denmark) Christian Faust Kjær	(Thailand) Laksika Kanlaha (Thailand) Phataimas Muenwong	(Denmark) Jesper Toft (Denmark) Clara Graversen
Nantes International	(France) Alex Lanier	(Denmark) Line Christophersen	(Denmark) Andreas Søndergaard (Denmark) Jesper Toft	(England) Chloe Birch (England) Estelle van Leeuwen	(Denmark) Jesper Toft (Denmark) Amalie Magelund
Réunion Open	(India) Tharun Mannepalli	(India) Tasnim Mir	(France) Julien Maio (France) William Villeger	(Japan) Kaho Osawa (Japan) Mai Tanabe	(France) Julien Maio (France) Léa Palermo
Northern Marianas Open	(Chinese Taipei) Cheng Kai	(Japan) Kaoru Sugiyama	(Japan) Takumi Nomura (Japan) Yuichi Shimogami	(Japan) Mizuki Otake (Japan) Miyu Takahashi	(Japan) Yuichi Shimogami (Japan) Sayaka Hobara
Saipan International	(Malaysia) Justin Hoh	(Japan) Riko Gunji	(Japan) Takumi Nomura (Japan) Yuichi Shimogami	(Japan) Kokona Ishikawa (Japan) Mio Konegawa	(Japan) Hiroki Nishi (Japan) Akari Sato
Maldives International	Cancelled				
Indonesia International (Pekanbaru)	(Indonesia) Yohanes Saut Marcellyno	(Japan) Hina Akechi	(South Korea) Ki Dong-ju (South Korea) Kim Jae-hyeon	(Japan) Miki Kanehiro (Japan) Rui Kiyama	(Indonesia) Jafar Hidayatullah (Indonesia) Felisha Pasaribu
Lagos International Classics	(Vietnam) Lê Đức Phát	(India) Shreya Lele	(India) Pruthvi Roy (India) Vishnuvardhan Goud Panjala	(India) Kavipriya Selvam (India) Simran Singhi	(India) Sathwik Kanapuram (India) Vaishnavi Khadkekar
Belgian International	(Belgium) Julien Carraggi	(India) Anmol Kharb	(Netherlands) Ties van der Lecq (Netherlands) Brian Wassink	(Scotland) Julie MacPherson (Scotland) Ciara Torrance	(Denmark) Rasmus Espersen (Denmark) Amalie Cecilie Kudsk
Malaysia International	(Japan) Minoru Koga	(Japan) Riko Gunji	(Philippines) Solomon Padiz Jr. (Philippines) Julius Villabrille	(Japan) Naru Shinoya (Japan) Nao Yamakita	(Indonesia) Amri Syahnawi (Indonesia) Nita Violina Marwah
Türkiye International	(Finland) Kalle Koljonen	(Azerbaijan) Keisha Fatimah Azzahra	(France) Julien Maio (France) William Villeger	(Spain) Paula López (Spain) Lucía Rodríguez	(France) Julien Maio (France) Léa Palermo
Bendigo International	(Japan) Shogo Ogawa	(India) Tanya Hemanth	(Chinese Taipei) Chen Cheng-kuan (Chinese Taipei) Po Li-wei	(Chinese Taipei) Hsu Yin-hui (Chinese Taipei) Lin Jhih-yun	(Singapore) Wesley Koh (Singapore) Jin Yujia
Sydney International	(Chinese Taipei) Huang Ping-hsien	(Chinese Taipei) Tung Ciou-tong	(Japan) Hiroki Midorikawa (Japan) Kyohei Yamashita	(Chinese Taipei) Hsu Yin-hui (Chinese Taipei) Lin Jhih-yun	(Chinese Taipei) Chen Cheng-kuan (Chinese Taipei) Hsu Yin-hui
North Harbour International	(Australia) Karono	(Chinese Taipei) Tsai Hsin-pei	(Japan) Hiroki Midorikawa (Japan) Kyohei Yamashita	(Chinese Taipei) Lee Chih-chen (Chinese Taipei) Lin Yen-yu	(Chinese Taipei) Chen Cheng-kuan (Chinese Taipei) Lee Chih-chen
Indonesia International (Surabaya)	(Japan) Koo Takahashi	(Thailand) Yataweemin Ketklieng	(Indonesia) Rahmat Hidayat (Indonesia) Yeremia Rambitan	(Indonesia) Lanny Tria Mayasari (Indonesia) Siti Fadia Silva Ramadhanti	(Indonesia) Jafar Hidayatullah (Indonesia) Felisha Pasaribu
Dutch Open	(Denmark) Mads Christophersen	(Malaysia) Kisona Selvaduray	(Denmark) Rasmus Espersen (Denmark) Christian Faust Kjær	(Bulgaria) Gabriela Stoeva (Bulgaria) Stefani Stoeva	(England) Callum Hemming (England) Estelle van Leeuwen
India International (Hyderabad)	(India) Rithvik Sanjeevi	(India) Isharani Baruah	(India) Pruthvi Roy (India) K. Sai Pratheek	(India) Priya Konjengbam (India) Shruti Mishra	(India) Rohan Kapoor (India) Ruthvika Gadde
India International (Raipur)	(India) Mithun Manjunath	(India) Rakshitha Ramraj	(India) Hariharan Amsakarunan (India) Ruban Kumar	(India) Arathi Sara Sunil (India) Varshini Viswanath Sri	(India) Rohan Kapoor (India) Ruthvika Gadde
Irish Open	(Republic of Ireland) Nhat Nguyen	(Japan) Sakura Masuki	(Denmark) William Kryger Boe (Denmark) Christian Faust Kjær	(Denmark) Natasja Anthonisen (Denmark) Maiken Fruergaard	(England) Callum Hemming (England) Estelle van Leeuwen
Scottish Open	(Belgium) Julien Carraggi	(Denmark) Julie Dawall Jakobsen	(Denmark) William Kryger Boe (Denmark) Christian Faust Kjær	(Netherlands) Debora Jille (Denmark) Sara Thygesen	(Scotland) Alexander Dunn (Scotland) Julie MacPherson
Canadian International	(Canada) Brian Yang	(Brazil) Juliana Vieira	(United States) Chen Zhi-yi (United States) Presley Smith	(Chinese Taipei) Lin Wan-ching (Chinese Taipei) Liu Chiao-yun	(Brazil) Fabrício Farias (Brazil) Jaqueline Lima
Bangladesh International	(Sri Lanka) Viren Nettasinghe	(Ukraine) Polina Buhrova	(Malaysia) Lau Yi Sheng (Malaysia) Lee Yi Bo	(Thailand) Kodchaporn Chaichana (Thailand) Pannawee Polyiam	(Singapore) Terry Hee (Singapore) Jin Yujia
Nepal International	(India) Meiraba Maisnam	(Thailand) Lalinrat Chaiwan	(Malaysia) Lau Yi Sheng (Malaysia) Lee Yi Bo	(Malaysia) Kisona Selvaduray (Malaysia) Yap Rui Chen	(Malaysia) Lau Yi Sheng (Malaysia) Yap Rui Chen

==== International Series ====
Tour	Men's singles	Women's singles	Men's doubles	Women's doubles	Mixed doubles
Estonian International	(Finland) Joakim Oldorff	(France) Rosy Oktavia Pancasari	(Singapore) Loh Kean Hean (Singapore) Nicholas Low	(Turkey) Bengisu Erçetin (Turkey) Nazlıcan İnci	(Germany) Jones Ralfy Jansen (Germany) Thuc Phuong Nguyen
Swedish Open	(Spain) Pablo Abián	(India) Devika Sihag	(Denmark) William Kryger Boe (Denmark) Christian Faust Kjær	(Sweden) Moa Sjöö (Sweden) Tilda Sjöö	(Denmark) Rasmus Espersen (Denmark) Amalie Cecilie Kudsk
Sri Lanka International	(Canada) Xiaodong Sheng	(Indonesia) Ruzana	(Thailand) Sirawit Sothon (Thailand) Natthapat Trinkajee	(Thailand) Pichamon Phatcharaphisutsin (Thailand) Nannapas Sukklad	(Thailand) Phatharathorn Nipornram (Thailand) Nattamon Laisuan
Portugal International	(Finland) Joakim Oldorff	(India) Devika Sihag	(Chinese Taipei) Chen Zhi-ray (Chinese Taipei) Lin Yu-chieh	(England) Chloe Birch (England) Estelle van Leeuwen	(England) Ethan van Leeuwen (England) Chloe Birch
Dutch International	(Denmark) Mads Juel Møller	(India) Isharani Baruah	(England) Rory Easton (England) Alex Green	(India) K. Ashwini Bhat (India) Shikha Gautam	(England) Rory Easton (England) Lizzie Tolman
Slovenia Open	(Malaysia) Justin Hoh	(India) Rakshitha Ramraj	(Indonesia) Muhammad Al Farizi (Indonesia) Nikolaus Joaquin	(Indonesia) Siti Sarah Azzahra (Indonesia) Agnia Sri Rahayu	(Indonesia) Amri Syahnawi (Indonesia) Indah Cahya Sari Jamil
Austrian Open	(Indonesia) Prahdiska Bagas Shujiwo	(Indonesia) Deswanti Hujansih Nurtertiati	(Indonesia) Daniel Edgar Marvino (Indonesia) Christopher David Wijaya	(Indonesia) Arlya Nabila Thesa Munggaran (Indonesia) Az Zahra Ditya Ramadhani	(Indonesia) Marwan Faza (Indonesia) Felisha Pasaribu
Santo Domingo Open	Cancelled				
Mauritius International	(Japan) Yudai Okimoto	(Japan) Nanaho Kondo	(France) Julien Maio (France) William Villeger	(Japan) Kaho Osawa (Japan) Mai Tanabe	(France) Julien Maio (France) Léa Palermo
Myanmar International	Cancelled				
Polish International	(Denmark) Ditlev Jaeger Holm	(India) Anmol Kharb	(Singapore) Wesley Koh (Singapore) Junsuke Kubo	(Poland) Paulina Hankiewicz (Poland) Kornelia Marczak	(Denmark) Kristoffer Kolding (Denmark) Mette Werge
Uganda International	(India) B. M. Rahul Bharadwaj	(Malaysia) Loh Zhi Wei	(India) Nithin H. V. (India) Harsha Veeramreddy	(India) Gayatri Rawat (India) Mansa Rawat	(Malaysia) Ashraf Zakaria (Malaysia) Lim Xuan
Egypt International	(India) Raghu Mariswamy	(Bulgaria) Stefani Stoeva	(Thailand) Kittisak Namdash (Thailand) Samatcha Tovannakasem	(Switzerland) Lucie Amiguet (Switzerland) Caroline Racloz	(Algeria) Koceila Mammeri (Algeria) Tanina Mammeri
Algeria International	(Croatia) Aria Dinata	(Italy) Yasmine Hamza	(Algeria) Koceila Mammeri (Algeria) Youcef Sabri Medel	(France) Tea Marguerite (France) Flavie Vallet	(Algeria) Koceila Mammeri (Algeria) Tanina Mammeri
Czech Open	(Germany) Matthias Kicklitz	(Denmark) Frederikke Lund	(Czech Republic) Jiří Král (Czech Republic) Ondřej Král	(Poland) Paulina Hankiewicz (Poland) Kornelia Marczak	(Denmark) Kristoffer Kolding (Denmark) Mette Werge
Perú International	(Israel) Misha Zilberman	(Brazil) Juliana Vieira	(Brazil) Izak Batalha (Brazil) Matheus Voigt	(Brazil) Jaqueline Lima (Brazil) Sâmia Lima	(Mexico) Luis Montoya (Mexico) Miriam Rodríguez
Venezuela International	Cancelled				
Mexican International	(United States) Mark Alcala	(Italy) Gianna Stiglich	(Guatemala) Christopher Martínez (Guatemala) Jonathan Solís	(Mexico) Romina Fregoso (Mexico) Miriam Rodríguez	(Mexico) Luis Montoya (Mexico) Miriam Rodríguez
Hungarian International	(Denmark) Jakob Houe	(Chinese Taipei) Wang Yu-si	(Canada) Jonathan Lai (Canada) Nyl Yakura	(England) Abbygael Harris (England) Lizzie Tolman	(Serbia) Mihajlo Tomic (Serbia) Andjela Vitman
Norwegian International	(Chinese Taipei) Chen Chi-ting	(Chinese Taipei) Wang Yu-si	(France) Maël Cattoen (France) Lucas Renoir	(Poland) Paulina Hankiewicz (Poland) Kornelia Marczak	(Denmark) Otto Reiler (Denmark) Amanda Aarrebo Petersen
Malaysia International	(Indonesia) Richie Duta Richardo	(Malaysia) Siti Zulaikha	(Indonesia) Emanuel Randhy Febryto (Indonesia) Reza Dwicahya Purnama	(China) Lin Fangling (China) Zhou Xinru	(China) Shang Yichen (China) Lin Fangling
Vietnam International (Bắc Giang)	(South Korea) Kim Byung-jae	(South Korea) Kim Min-ji	(Chinese Taipei) He Zhi-wei (Chinese Taipei) Huang Jui-hsuan	(Indonesia) Isyana Syahira Meida (Indonesia) Rinjani Kwinara Nastine	(Vietnam) Trần Đình Mạnh (Vietnam) Phạm Thị Khánh
Zambia International	(Kazakhstan) Dmitriy Panarin	(Azerbaijan) Era Maftuha	(Azerbaijan) Agil Gabilov (Azerbaijan) Dicky Dwi Pangestu	(Maldives) Aminath Nabeeha Abdul Razzaq (Maldives) Fathimath Nabaaha Abdul Razzaq	(Azerbaijan) Agil Gabilov (Azerbaijan) Era Maftuha
Bahrain International (I)	(India) Kavin Thangam Kavin	(India) Prakriti Bharath	(Philippines) Solomon Padiz Jr. (Philippines) Julius Villabrille	(India) Annanya Pravin (India) Prerana N. Shet	(Bulgaria) Evgeni Panev (Bulgaria) Gabriela Stoeva
Suriname International	(Israel) Misha Zilberman	(Peru) Inés Castillo	(Suriname) Sören Opti (Suriname) Mitchel Wongsodikromo	(Peru) Inés Castillo (Peru) Namie Miyahira	(Guatemala) Christopher Martínez (Guatemala) Diana Corleto
Vietnam International (Ninh Bình)	(South Korea) Kim Byung-jae	(Japan) Kana Furukawa	(Chinese Taipei) He Zhi-wei (Chinese Taipei) Huang Jui-hsuan	(China) Lin Fangling (China) Zhou Xinru	(China) Shang Yichen (China) Lin Fangling
Bahrain International (II)	(India) Manraj Singh	(Japan) Nanami Someya	(Philippines) Christian Bernardo (Philippines) Alvin Morada	(Bulgaria) Gabriela Stoeva (Bulgaria) Stefani Stoeva	(Kazakhstan) Dmitriy Panarin (Kazakhstan) Aisha Zhumabek
El Salvador International	(United States) Mark Alcala	(Brazil) Juliana Vieira	(Brazil) Fabrício Farias (Brazil) Davi Silva	(Brazil) Jaqueline Lima (Brazil) Sâmia Lima	(Brazil) Davi Silva (Brazil) Sania Lima
Welsh International	(Australia) Karono	(Chinese Taipei) Huang Ching-ping	(England) Oliver Butler (England) Samuel Jones	(Spain) Paula López (Spain) Lucía Rodríguez	(Spain) Rubén García (Spain) Lucía Rodríguez
Thailand International	(South Korea) Jeon Hyeok-jin	(Thailand) Tidapron Kleebyeesun	(South Korea) Choi Sol-gyu (South Korea) Lim Su-min	(Thailand) Tidapron Kleebyeesun (Thailand) Nattamon Laisuan	(Thailand) Phuwanat Horbanluekit (Thailand) Fungfa Korpthammakit

==== Future Series ====
Tour	Men's singles	Women's singles	Men's doubles	Women's doubles	Mixed doubles
Iceland International	(Denmark) Mads Juel Møller	(Switzerland) Milena Schnider	(Denmark) Benjamin Illum Klindt (Denmark) Magnus Klinggaard	(Denmark) Sophia Lemming (Denmark) Cathrine Marie Wind	(Denmark) Mikkel Klinggaard (Denmark) Naja Abildgaard
Giraldilla International	(Jamaica) Samuel Ricketts	(Cuba) Taymara Oropesa	(Guatemala) Yeison del Cid (Guatemala) Christopher Martínez	(Guatemala) Diana Corleto (Guatemala) Mariana Paiz	(Guatemala) Christopher Martínez (Guatemala) Mariana Paiz
Malta International	(Austria) Collins Filimon	(Indonesia) Aurelia Salsabila	(Norway) Torjus Flåtten (Norway) Vegard Rikheim	(Denmark) Anna-Sofie Nielsen (Denmark) Frederikke Nielsen	(Ukraine) Viacheslav Yakovlev (Ukraine) Polina Tkach
Slovak Open	(England) Ethan Rose	(India) Purva Barve	(Poland) Jakub Melaniuk (Poland) Wiktor Trecki	(Austria) Serena Au Yeong (Austria) Katharina Hochmeir	(Poland) Jakub Melaniuk (Poland) Julia Pławecka
Finnish International	(Japan) Yudai Okimoto	(France) Anna Tatranova	(Estonia) Karl Kert (Estonia) Tauri Kilk	(Australia) Priska Kustiadi (Australia) Nozomi Shimizu	(Malaysia) Tan Wei Liang (Malaysia) Wong Kha Yan
Peru Future Series	Cancelled				
Bonn International	(Chinese Taipei) Cheng Kai	(India) Tanvi Sharma	(Chinese Taipei) Cheng Kai (Chinese Taipei) Su Wei-cheng	(Turkey) Yasemen Bektaş (Turkey) Zehra Erdem	(Indonesia) Alden Lefilson Putra Mainaky (Indonesia) Fitriani
Lithuanian International	(Denmark) William Bøgebjerg	(Malaysia) Siti Nurshuhaini	(France) Nicolas Hoareau (France) Aymeric Tores	(France) Marie Cesari (France) Lilou Schaffner	(Indonesia) Alden Lefilson Putra Mainaky (Indonesia) Fitriani
Venezuela Open	(Peru) Adriano Viale	(Brazil) Maria Clara Lima	(El Salvador) Javier Alas (Venezuela) Joiser Calanche	(Brazil) Maria Clara Lima (Brazil) Maria Nascimento	(Trinidad and Tobago) Reece Marcano (Trinidad and Tobago) Chequeda De Boulet
Future Series Nouvelle-Aquitaine	(England) Cholan Kayan	(Czech Republic) Petra Maixnerová	(France) Aymeric Tores (Netherlands) Dyon Van Wijlick	(Netherlands) Meerte Loos (Netherlands) Kelly Van Buiten	(France) Aymeric Tores (France) Lilou Schaffner
Myanmar International	Cancelled				
Latvia International	(Croatia) Aria Dinata	(Finland) Nella Nyqvist	(Germany) Jonathan Dresp (Germany) Aaron Sonnenschein	(Poland) Anastasia Khomich (Poland) Daria Zimnol	(Estonia) Kristjan Kaljurand (Estonia) Helina Rüütel
Mexico Future Series	(Canada) Joshua Nguyen	(United States) Ella Lin	(United States) Ryan Ma (Canada) Daniel Zhou	(United States) Ella Lin (United States) Veronica Yang	(Guatemala) Christopher Martínez (Guatemala) Diana Corleto
Guatemala Future Series	(Peru) Adriano Viale	(France) Romane Cloteaux-Foucault	(Guatemala) Christopher Martínez (Guatemala) Jonathan Solís	(Guatemala) Diana Corleto (Guatemala) Nikté Sotomayor	(Guatemala) Christopher Martínez (Guatemala) Diana Corleto
Slovenia Future Series	(France) Enogat Roy	(France) Anna Tatranova	(Switzerland) Yann Orteu (Switzerland) Minh Quang Pham	(Switzerland) Lucie Amiguet (Switzerland) Caroline Racloz	(Slovenia) Miha Ivančič (Slovenia) Petra Polanc
Costa Rica Future Series	(Peru) Adriano Viale	(Canada) Chloe Hoang	(Portugal) Bruno Carvalho (Portugal) Diogo Gloria	(Peru) Fernanda Munar (Peru) Rafaela Munar	(Canada) Timothy Lock (Canada) Chloe Hoang
Iran International Khazar Cup	Cancelled				
Kampala International	(India) Manraj Singh	(India) Shreya Lele	(Malaysia) Ariffin Zakaria (Malaysia) Ashraf Zakaria	(India) Gayatri Rawat (India) Mansa Rawat	(Malaysia) Ashraf Zakaria (Malaysia) Lim Xuan
Croatian International	(Indonesia) Rizki Ansyahri	(India) Raksha Kandasamy	(Serbia) Viktor Petrović (Serbia) Mihajlo Tomić	(Austria) Serena Au Yeong (Austria) Anna Hagspiel	(Serbia) Mihajlo Tomić (Serbia) Andjela Vitman
Bulgarian International	(Sweden) Gustav Bjorkler	(Bulgaria) Stefani Stoeva	(Portugal) Bruno Carvalho (Portugal) David Silva	(Bulgaria) Gabriela Stoeva (Bulgaria) Stefani Stoeva	(Norway) Jonas Østhassel (Norway) Julie Abusdal
Israel Open	Cancelled				
Spanish International	Cancelled				
Botswana International	(Azerbaijan) Dicky Dwi Pangestu	(Maldives) Fathimath Nabaaha Abdul Razzaq	(Azerbaijan) Agil Gabilov (Azerbaijan) Dicky Dwi Pangestu	(Sri Lanka) Hasini Ambalangodage (Sri Lanka) Hasara Wijayarathne	(Azerbaijan) Agil Gabilov (Azerbaijan) Era Maftuha
South Africa International	(England) Ben Hammond	(South Africa) Johanita Scholtz	(Malta) Matthew Abela (Israel) Maxim Grinblat	(South Africa) Amy Ackerman (South Africa) Deidre Laurens	(South Africa) Caden Kakora (South Africa) Johanita Scholtz

== Statistics ==
=== Performance by countries ===
Below are the 2024 BWF Continental Circuit performances by country. Only countries who have won a title are listed:

==== International Challenge ====
Rank	Team	IRN	SRI	AZE	UGA	VIE	POL	THA	KAZ	MEX	LUX	DEN	FRA	REU	NMI	SAI	INA	NGR	BEL	MAS	TUR	BEN	SYD	NZL	INA	NED	IND1	IND2	IRL	SCO	CAN	BAN	NEP	Total
1	India	2	3	2	3		2		2					2				4	1			1					5	5					1	33
2	Japan							1	1	2	2	2		1	4	4	2			3		1	1	1	1				1					27
3	Denmark						1				1.5	2	3						1							2			2	2.5				15
4	Chinese Taipei					2	1								1							2	4	3							1			14
5	Thailand		1			2		3				1													1							1	1	10
6	Malaysia							1	1							1										1						1	3	8
7	France								1		1.5		1	2							2													7.5
8	Indonesia		1														2			1					3									7
9	Brazil	1																													2			3
9	England												1													1			1					3
9	South Korea			1		1											1																	3
9	United States				1					1																					1			3
9	Vietnam	1			1													1																3
14	Belgium																		1											1				2
14	Bulgaria			1																						1								2
14	Canada						1																								1			2
14	Scotland																		1											1				2
14	Singapore																					1										1		2
14	Ukraine									1																						1		2
20	Netherlands																		1											0.5				1.5
21	Australia																							1										1
21	Azerbaijan																				1													1
21	Czech Republic			1																														1
21	Finland																				1													1
21	Hong Kong	1																																1
21	Ireland																												1					1
21	Mexico									1																								1
21	Philippines																			1														1
21	Spain																				1													1
21	Sri Lanka																															1		1

==== International Series ====
Rank	Team	EST	SWE	SRI	POR	NED	SLO	AUT	MRI	POL	UGA	EGY	CZE	PER	ALG	MEX	HUN	NOR	MAS	VIE1	BHR1	SUR	ZAM	VIE2	BHR2	SLV	WAL	THA	Total
1	India		1		1	2	1			1	3	1									3				1				14
2	Indonesia			1			3	5											2	1									12
3	Denmark		2			1				2			2				1	1											9
4	Brazil													3												4			7
4	Chinese Taipei				1												1	2		1				1			1		7
4	Thailand			3								1																3	7
7	England				2	2											1										1		6
8	France	1							2						1			1											5
8	Japan								3															1	1				5
8	South Korea																			2				1				2	5
11	China																		2					2					4
11	Malaysia						1				2								1										4
13	Algeria											1			2														3
13	Azerbaijan																						3						3
13	Bulgaria											1									1				1				3
13	Mexico													1		2													3
13	Poland									1			1					1											3
13	Spain		1																								2		3
19	Canada			1													1												2
19	Finland	1			1																								2
19	Germany	1											1																2
19	Guatemala															1						1							2
19	Israel													1								1							2
19	Italy														1	1													2
19	Kazakhstan																						1		1				2
19	Peru																					2							2
19	Philippines																				1				1				2
19	Singapore	1								1																			2
19	United States															1										1			2
30	Australia																										1		1
30	Croatia														1														1
30	Czech Republic												1																1
30	Maldives																						1						1
30	Serbia																1												1
30	Suriname																					1							1
30	Sweden		1																										1
30	Switzerland											1																	1
30	Turkey	1																											1
30	Vietnam																			1									1

==== Future Series ====
Rank	Team	ISL	CUB	MLT	SVK	FIN	GER	LTU	VEN	FRA	MEX	LAT	GUA	SVN	CRC	UGA	CRO	BUL	BOT	RSA	Total
1	France					1		2		1.5			1	2							7.5
2	Guatemala		3								1		3								7
3	Denmark	4		1				1													6
3	India				1		1									3	1				6
5	Indonesia			1			1	1									1				4
5	Malaysia					1		1								2					4
5	Peru								1				1		2						4
8	Canada										1.5				2						3.5
9	Austria			1	1												1				3
9	Azerbaijan																		3		3
9	England				1					1										1	3
9	Poland				2							1									3
9	South Africa																			3	3
9	Switzerland	1												2							3
15	United States										2.5										2.5
16	Brazil								2												2
16	Bulgaria																	2			2
16	Chinese Taipei						2														2
16	Estonia					1						1									2
16	Maldives									1									1		2
16	Norway			1														1			2
16	Portugal														1			1			2
16	Serbia																2				2
24	Netherlands									1.5											1.5
25	Australia					1															1
25	Croatia											1									1
25	Cuba		1																		1
25	Czech Republic									1											1
25	Finland											1									1
25	Germany											1									1
25	Jamaica		1																		1
25	Japan					1															1
25	Slovenia													1							1
25	Sweden																	1			1
25	Sri Lanka																		1		1
25	Trinidad and Tobago								1												1
25	Turkey						1														1
25	Ukraine			1																	1
39	El Salvador								0.5												0.5
39	Israel																			0.5	0.5
39	Malta																			0.5	0.5
39	Venezuela								0.5												0.5

=== Performance by categories ===
These tables were calculated after the finals of the Nepal International.

==== Men's singles ====
Rank	Player	IC	IS	FS	Total
1	(Peru) Adriano Viale			3	3
2	(Belgium) Julien Carraggi	2			2
2	(Chinese Taipei) Huang Ping-hsien	2			2
2	(France) Alex Lanier	2			2
2	(India) Tharun Mannepalli	2			2
2	(Vietnam) Lê Đức Phát	2			2
7	(Australia) Karono	1	1		2
7	(Malaysia) Justin Hoh	1	1		2
7	(South Korea) Jeon Hyeok-jin	1	1		2
10	(Chinese Taipei) Cheng Kai	1		1	2
11	(Finland) Joakim Oldorff		2		2
11	(Israel) Misha Zilberman		2		2
11	(South Korea) Kim Byung-jae		2		2
11	(United States) Mark Alcala		2		2
15	(Croatia) Aria Dinata		1	1	2
15	(Denmark) Mads Juel Møller		1	1	2
15	(India) Manraj Singh		1	1	2
15	(Japan) Yudai Okimoto		1	1	2
19	(Canada) Brian Yang	1			1
19	(Denmark) Mads Christophersen	1			1
19	(Denmark) Victor Ørding Kauffmann	1			1
19	(Finland) Kalle Koljonen	1			1
19	(India) Kartikey Gulshan Kumar	1			1
19	(India) Meiraba Maisnam	1			1
19	(India) Rithvik Sanjeevi	1			1
19	(India) Mithun Manjunath	1			1
19	(Indonesia) Yohanes Saut Marcellyno	1			1
19	(Republic of Ireland) Nhat Nguyen	1			1
19	(Japan) Minoru Koga	1			1
19	(Japan) Ryoma Muramoto	1			1
19	(Japan) Shogo Ogawa	1			1
19	(Japan) Koo Takahashi	1			1
19	(Japan) Yushi Tanaka	1			1
19	(Sri Lanka) Viren Nettasinghe	1			1
19	(Thailand) Panitchaphon Teeraratsakul	1			1
19	(Vietnam) Nguyễn Hải Đăng	1			1
37	(Canada) Xiaodong Sheng		1		1
37	(Chinese Taipei) Chen Chi-ting		1		1
37	(Denmark) Ditlev Jaeger Holm		1		1
37	(Denmark) Jakob Houe		1		1
37	(Germany) Matthias Kicklitz		1		1
37	(India) B. M. Rahul Bharadwaj		1		1
37	(India) Kavin Thangam Kavin		1		1
37	(India) Raghu Mariswamy		1		1
37	(Indonesia) Richie Duta Richardo		1		1
37	(Indonesia) Prahdiska Bagas Shujiwo		1		1
37	(Kazakhstan) Dmitriy Panarin		1		1
37	(Spain) Pablo Abián		1		1
49	(Austria) Collins Filimon			1	1
49	(Azerbaijan) Dicky Dwi Pangestu			1	1
49	(Canada) Joshua Nguyen			1	1
49	(Denmark) William Bøgebjerg			1	1
49	(England) Ben Hammond			1	1
49	(England) Cholan Kayan			1	1
49	(England) Ethan Rose			1	1
49	(France) Enogat Roy			1	1
49	(Indonesia) Rizki Ansyahri			1	1
49	(Jamaica) Samuel Ricketts			1	1
49	(Sweden) Gustav Bjorkler			1	1

==== Women's singles ====
Rank	Player	IC	IS	FS	Total
1	(Japan) Riko Gunji	4			4
2	(India) Isharani Baruah	2	1		3
3	(Brazil) Juliana Vieira	1	2		3
4	(India) Anupama Upadhyaya	2			2
4	(Japan) Hina Akechi	2			2
6	(India) Anmol Kharb	1	1		2
6	(India) Rakshitha Ramraj	1	1		2
8	(India) Shreya Lele	1		1	2
9	(Chinese Taipei) Wang Yu-si		2		2
9	(India) Devika Sihag		2		2
11	(Bulgaria) Stefani Stoeva		1	1	2
12	(France) Anna Tatranova			2	2
13	(Azerbaijan) Keisha Fatimah Azzahra	1			1
13	(Chinese Taipei) Tsai Hsin-pei	1			1
13	(Chinese Taipei) Tung Ciou-tong	1			1
13	(Denmark) Line Christophersen	1			1
13	(Denmark) Julie Dawall Jakobsen	1			1
13	(Hong Kong) Lo Sin Yan	1			1
13	(India) Malvika Bansod	1			1
13	(India) Tanya Hemanth	1			1
13	(India) Aakarshi Kashyap	1			1
13	(India) Tasnim Mir	1			1
13	(Japan) Sakura Masuki	1			1
13	(Japan) Kaoru Sugiyama	1			1
13	(Malaysia) Kisona Selvaduray	1			1
13	(South Korea) Sim Yu-jin	1			1
13	(Thailand) Lalinrat Chaiwan	1			1
13	(Thailand) Yataweemin Ketklieng	1			1
13	(Ukraine) Polina Buhrova	1			1
13	(United States) Ishika Jaiswal	1			1
31	(Azerbaijan) Era Maftuha		1		1
31	(Chinese Taipei) Huang Ching-ping		1		1
31	(Denmark) Frederikke Lund		1		1
31	(France) Rosy Oktavia Pancasari		1		1
31	(India) Prakriti Bharath		1		1
31	(Indonesia) Deswanti Hujansih Nurtertiati		1		1
31	(Indonesia) Ruzana		1		1
31	(Italy) Yasmine Hamza		1		1
31	(Italy) Gianna Stiglich		1		1
31	(Japan) Kana Furukawa		1		1
31	(Japan) Nanaho Kondo		1		1
31	(Japan) Nanami Someya		1		1
31	(Malaysia) Loh Zhi Wei		1		1
31	(Malaysia) Siti Zulaikha		1		1
31	(Peru) Inés Castillo		1		1
31	(South Korea) Kim Min-ji		1		1
31	(Thailand) Tidapron Kleebyeesun		1		1
48	(Brazil) Maria Clara Lima			1	1
48	(Canada) Chloe Hoang			1	1
48	(Cuba) Taymara Oropesa			1	1
48	(Czech Republic) Petra Maixnerová			1	1
48	(Finland) Nella Nyqvist			1	1
48	(France) Romane Cloteaux-Foucault			1	1
48	(India) Purva Barve			1	1
48	(India) Raksha Kandasamy			1	1
48	(India) Tanvi Sharma			1	1
48	(Indonesia) Aurelia Salsabila			1	1
48	(Malaysia) Siti Nurshuhaini			1	1
48	(Maldives) Fathimath Nabaaha Abdul Razzaq			1	1
48	(South Africa) Johanita Scholtz			1	1
48	(Switzerland) Milena Schnider			1	1
48	(United States) Ella Lin			1	1

==== Men's doubles ====
Rank	Players	IC	IS	FS	Total
1	(Denmark) Christian Faust Kjær	5	1		6
2	(Denmark) William Kryger Boe	4	1		5
3	(France) Julien Maio	2	1		3
3	(France) William Villeger	2	1		3
5	(Guatemala) Christopher Martínez		1	2	3
6	(India) Dhruv Kapila	2			2
6	(India) Arjun M. R.	2			2
6	(India) Pruthvi Roy	2			2
6	(India) K. Sai Pratheek	2			2
6	(Indonesia) Rahmat Hidayat	2			2
6	(Indonesia) Yeremia Rambitan	2			2
6	(Japan) Hiroki Midorikawa	2			2
6	(Japan) Takumi Nomura	2			2
6	(Japan) Yuichi Shimogami	2			2
6	(Japan) Kyohei Yamashita	2			2
6	(Malaysia) Lau Yi Sheng	2			2
6	(Malaysia) Lee Yi Bo	2			2
18	(Czech Republic) Ondřej Král	1	1		2
18	(Philippines) Solomon Padiz Jr.	1	1		2
18	(Philippines) Julius Villabrille	1	1		2
21	(Chinese Taipei) He Zhi-wei		2		2
21	(Chinese Taipei) Huang Jui-hsuan		2		2
23	(Azerbaijan) Agil Gabilov		1	1	2
23	(Azerbaijan) Dicky Dwi Pangestu		1	1	2
23	(Guatemala) Jonathan Solís		1	1	2
26	(France) Aymeric Tores			2	2
26	(Portugal) Bruno Carvalho			2	2
28	(Chinese Taipei) Chen Cheng-kuan	1			1
28	(Chinese Taipei) Chiu Hsiang-chieh	1			1
28	(Chinese Taipei) Liu Kuang-heng	1			1
28	(Chinese Taipei) Po Li-wei	1			1
28	(Czech Republic) Adam Mendrek	1			1
28	(Denmark) Rasmus Espersen	1			1
28	(Denmark) Andreas Søndergaard	1			1
28	(Denmark) Jesper Toft	1			1
28	(France) Lucas Corvée	1			1
28	(France) Ronan Labar	1			1
28	(India) Hariharan Amsakarunan	1			1
28	(India) Krishna Prasad Garaga	1			1
28	(India) Ruban Kumar	1			1
28	(India) Vishnuvardhan Goud Panjala	1			1
28	(Japan) Seiya Inoue	1			1
28	(Japan) Haruki Kawabe	1			1
28	(Malaysia) Kang Khai Xing	1			1
28	(Malaysia) Aaron Tai	1			1
28	(Netherlands) Ties van der Lecq	1			1
28	(Netherlands) Brian Wassink	1			1
28	(South Korea) Ki Dong-ju	1			1
28	(South Korea) Kim Jae-hyeon	1			1
28	(United States) Chen Zhi-yi	1			1
28	(United States) Presley Smith	1			1
52	(Algeria) Koceila Mammeri		1		1
52	(Algeria) Youcef Sabri Medel		1		1
52	(Brazil) Izak Batalha		1		1
52	(Brazil) Fabrício Farias		1		1
52	(Brazil) Davi Silva		1		1
52	(Brazil) Matheus Voigt		1		1
52	(Canada) Jonathan Lai		1		1
52	(Canada) Nyl Yakura		1		1
52	(Chinese Taipei) Chen Zhi-ray		1		1
52	(Chinese Taipei) Lin Yu-chieh		1		1
52	(Czech Republic) Jiří Král		1		1
52	(England) Oliver Butler		1		1
52	(England) Rory Easton		1		1
52	(England) Alex Green		1		1
52	(England) Samuel Jones		1		1
52	(France) Maël Cattoen		1		1
52	(France) Lucas Renoir		1		1
52	(India) Nithin H. V.		1		1
52	(India) Harsha Veeramreddy		1		1
52	(Indonesia) Muhammad Al Farizi		1		1
52	(Indonesia) Nikolaus Joaquin		1		1
52	(Indonesia) Emanuel Randhy Febryto		1		1
52	(Indonesia) Daniel Edgar Marvino		1		1
52	(Indonesia) Reza Dwicahya Purnama		1		1
52	(Indonesia) Christopher David Wijaya		1		1
52	(Philippines) Christian Bernardo		1		1
52	(Philippines) Alvin Morada		1		1
52	(Singapore) Wesley Koh		1		1
52	(Singapore) Junsuke Kubo		1		1
52	(Singapore) Loh Kean Hean		1		1
52	(Singapore) Nicholas Low		1		1
52	(South Korea) Choi Sol-gyu		1		1
52	(South Korea) Lim Su-min		1		1
52	(Suriname) Sören Opti		1		1
52	(Suriname) Mitchel Wongsodikromo		1		1
52	(Thailand) Kittisak Namdash		1		1
52	(Thailand) Sirawit Sothon		1		1
52	(Thailand) Samatcha Tovannakasem		1		1
52	(Thailand) Natthapat Trinkajee		1		1
91	(Canada) Daniel Zhou			1	1
91	(Chinese Taipei) Cheng Kai			1	1
91	(Chinese Taipei) Su Wei-cheng			1	1
91	(Denmark) Benjamin Illum Klindt			1	1
91	(Denmark) Magnus Klinggaard			1	1
91	(El Salvador) Javier Alas			1	1
91	(Estonia) Karl Kert			1	1
91	(Estonia) Tauri Kilk			1	1
91	(France) Nicolas Hoareau			1	1
91	(Germany) Jonathan Dresp			1	1
91	(Germany) Aaron Sonnenschein			1	1
91	(Guatemala) Yeison del Cid			1	1
91	(Israel) Maxim Grinblat			1	1
91	(Malaysia) Ariffin Zakaria			1	1
91	(Malaysia) Ashraf Zakaria			1	1
91	(Malta) Matthew Abela			1	1
91	(Netherlands) Dyon Van Wijlick			1	1
91	(Norway) Torjus Flåtten			1	1
91	(Norway) Vegard Rikheim			1	1
91	(Poland) Jakub Melaniuk			1	1
91	(Poland) Wiktor Trecki			1	1
91	(Portugal) Diogo Gloria			1	1
91	(Portugal) David Silva			1	1
91	(Serbia) Viktor Petrović			1	1
91	(Serbia) Mihajlo Tomić			1	1
91	(Switzerland) Yann Orteu			1	1
91	(Switzerland) Minh Quang Pham			1	1
91	(United States) Ryan Ma			1	1
91	(Venezuela) Joiser Calanche			1	1

==== Women's doubles ====
Rank	Players	IC	IS	FS	Total
1	(Bulgaria) Gabriela Stoeva	2	1	1	4
1	(Bulgaria) Stefani Stoeva	2	1	1	4
3	(Chinese Taipei) Hsu Yin-hui	3			3
3	(Chinese Taipei) Lin Jhih-yun	3			3
3	(Thailand) Laksika Kanlaha	3			3
3	(Thailand) Phataimas Muenwong	3			3
7	(Japan) Kaho Osawa	2	1		3
7	(Japan) Mai Tanabe	2	1		3
9	(Brazil) Jaqueline Lima	1	2		3
9	(Brazil) Sâmia Lima	1	2		3
11	(Poland) Paulina Hankiewicz		3		3
11	(Poland) Kornelia Marczak		3		3
13	(Japan) Miki Kanehiro	2			2
13	(Japan) Rui Kiyama	2			2
15	(England) Chloe Birch	1	1		2
15	(England) Estelle van Leeuwen	1	1		2
15	(Spain) Paula López	1	1		2
15	(Spain) Lucía Rodríguez	1	1		2
15	(Thailand) Pichamon Phatcharaphisutsin	1	1		2
15	(Thailand) Nannapas Sukklad	1	1		2
21	(China) Lin Fangling		2		2
21	(China) Zhou Xinru		2		2
23	(India) Gayatri Rawat		1	1	2
23	(India) Mansa Rawat		1	1	2
23	(Switzerland) Lucie Amiguet		1	1	2
23	(Switzerland) Caroline Racloz		1	1	2
27	(Austria) Serena Au Yeong			2	2
27	(Guatemala) Diana Corleto			2	2
29	(Chinese Taipei) Lee Chih-chen	1			1
29	(Chinese Taipei) Lin Wan-ching	1			1
29	(Chinese Taipei) Lin Yen-yu	1			1
29	(Chinese Taipei) Liu Chiao-yun	1			1
29	(Denmark) Natasja Anthonisen	1			1
29	(Denmark) Maiken Fruergaard	1			1
29	(Denmark) Sara Thygesen	1			1
29	(India) Priya Konjengbam	1			1
29	(India) Shruti Mishra	1			1
29	(India) Arathi Sara Sunil	1			1
29	(India) Kavipriya Selvam	1			1
29	(India) Simran Singhi	1			1
29	(India) Varshini Viswanath Sri	1			1
29	(Indonesia) Lanny Tria Mayasari	1			1
29	(Indonesia) Siti Fadia Silva Ramadhanti	1			1
29	(Japan) Kokona Ishikawa	1			1
29	(Japan) Mio Konegawa	1			1
29	(Japan) Mizuki Otake	1			1
29	(Japan) Naru Shinoya	1			1
29	(Japan) Miyu Takahashi	1			1
29	(Japan) Nao Yamakita	1			1
29	(Malaysia) Kisona Selvaduray	1			1
29	(Malaysia) Yap Rui Chen	1			1
29	(Netherlands) Debora Jille	1			1
29	(Scotland) Julie MacPherson	1			1
29	(Scotland) Ciara Torrance	1			1
29	(Thailand) Kodchaporn Chaichana	1			1
29	(Thailand) Pannawee Polyiam	1			1
29	(Ukraine) Polina Buhrova	1			1
29	(Ukraine) Yevheniia Kantemyr	1			1
29	(United States) Paula Lynn Cao Hok	1			1
29	(United States) Lauren Lam	1			1
61	(England) Abbygael Harris		1		1
61	(England) Lizzie Tolman		1		1
61	(France) Tea Marguerite		1		1
61	(France) Flavie Vallet		1		1
61	(India) K. Ashwini Bhat		1		1
61	(India) Shikha Gautam		1		1
61	(India) Annanya Pravin		1		1
61	(India) Prerana N. Shet		1		1
61	(Indonesia) Siti Sarah Azzahra		1		1
61	(Indonesia) Isyana Syahira Meida		1		1
61	(Indonesia) Arlya Nabila Thesa Munggaran		1		1
61	(Indonesia) Rinjani Kwinara Nastine		1		1
61	(Indonesia) Agnia Sri Rahayu		1		1
61	(Indonesia) Az Zahra Ditya Ramadhani		1		1
61	(Maldives) Aminath Nabeeha Abdul Razzaq		1		1
61	(Maldives) Fathimath Nabaaha Abdul Razzaq		1		1
61	(Mexico) Romina Fregoso		1		1
61	(Mexico) Miriam Rodríguez		1		1
61	(Peru) Inés Castillo		1		1
61	(Peru) Namie Miyahira		1		1
61	(Sweden) Moa Sjöö		1		1
61	(Sweden) Tilda Sjöö		1		1
61	(Thailand) Tidapron Kleebyeesun		1		1
61	(Thailand) Nattamon Laisuan		1		1
61	(Turkey) Bengisu Erçetin		1		1
61	(Turkey) Nazlıcan İnci		1		1
87	(Australia) Priska Kustiadi			1	1
87	(Australia) Nozomi Shimizu			1	1
87	(Austria) Anna Hagspiel			1	1
87	(Austria) Katharina Hochmeir			1	1
87	(Brazil) Maria Nascimento			1	1
87	(Brazil) Maria Clara Lima			1	1
87	(Denmark) Sophia Lemming			1	1
87	(Denmark) Anna-Sofie Nielsen			1	1
87	(Denmark) Frederikke Nielsen			1	1
87	(Denmark) Cathrine Marie Wind			1	1
87	(France) Marie Cesari			1	1
87	(France) Lilou Schaffner			1	1
87	(Guatemala) Mariana Paiz			1	1
87	(Guatemala) Nikté Sotomayor			1	1
87	(Netherlands) Meerte Loos			1	1
87	(Netherlands) Kelly Van Buiten			1	1
87	(Peru) Fernanda Munar			1	1
87	(Peru) Rafaela Munar			1	1
87	(Poland) Anastasia Khomich			1	1
87	(Poland) Daria Zimnol			1	1
87	(South Africa) Amy Ackerman			1	1
87	(South Africa) Deidre Laurens			1	1
87	(Sri Lanka) Hasini Ambalangodage			1	1
87	(Sri Lanka) Hasara Wijayarathne			1	1
87	(Turkey) Yasemen Bektaş			1	1
87	(Turkey) Zehra Erdem			1	1
87	(United States) Ella Lin			1	1
87	(United States) Veronica Yang			1	1

==== Mixed doubles ====
Rank	Players	IC	IS	FS	Total
1	(Guatemala) Christopher Martínez		1	3	4
2	(India) Sathish Karunakaran	3			3
2	(India) Aadya Variyath	3			3
4	(France) Julien Maio	2	1		3
4	(France) Léa Palermo	2	1		3
4	(Indonesia) Felisha Pasaribu	2	1		3
7	(Mexico) Luis Montoya	1	2		3
7	(Mexico) Miriam Rodríguez	1	2		3
8	(Guatemala) Diana Corleto		1	2	3
10	(Chinese Taipei) Chen Cheng-kuan	2			2
10	(Denmark) Jesper Toft	2			2
10	(England) Callum Hemming	2			2
10	(England) Estelle van Leeuwen	2			2
10	(India) Ruthvika Gadde	2			2
10	(India) Rohan Kapoor	2			2
10	(Indonesia) Jafar Hidayatullah	2			2
10	(Singapore) Jin Yujia	2			2
10	(Thailand) Pakkapon Teeraratsakul	2			2
10	(Thailand) Phataimas Muenwong	2			2
20	(Denmark) Rasmus Espersen	1	1		2
20	(Denmark) Amalie Cecilie Kudsk	1	1		2
20	(Indonesia) Amri Syahnawi	1	1		2
23	(Algeria) Koceila Mammeri		2		2
23	(Algeria) Tanina Mammeri		2		2
23	(China) Lin Fangling		2		2
23	(China) Shang Yichen		2		2
23	(Denmark) Kristoffer Kolding		2		2
23	(Denmark) Mette Werge		2		2
29	(Azerbaijan) Agil Gabilov		1	1	2
29	(Azerbaijan) Era Maftuha		1	1	2
29	(Malaysia) Ashraf Zakaria		1	1	2
29	(Malaysia) Lim Xuan		1	1	2
29	(Serbia) Mihajlo Tomić		1	1	2
29	(Serbia) Andjela Vitman		1	1	2
35	(Indonesia) Alden Lefilson Putra Mainaky			2	2
35	(Indonesia) Fitriani			2	2
37	(Brazil) Fabrício Farias	1			1
37	(Brazil) Jaqueline Lima	1			1
37	(Canada) Ty Alexander Lindeman	1			1
37	(Canada) Josephine Wu	1			1
37	(Chinese Taipei) Hsu Yin-hui	1			1
37	(Chinese Taipei) Lee Chih-chen	1			1
37	(Denmark) Iben Bergstein	1			1
37	(Denmark) Clara Graversen	1			1
37	(Denmark) Amalie Magelund	1			1
37	(France) Grégoire Deschamp	1			1
37	(India) Sathwik Reddy Kanapuram	1			1
37	(India) Vaishnavi Khadkekar	1			1
37	(India) Amrutha Pramuthesh	1			1
37	(India) Ashith Surya	1			1
37	(Indonesia) Nita Violina Marwah	1			1
37	(Japan) Hiroki Nishi	1			1
37	(Japan) Yuichi Shimogami	1			1
37	(Japan) Sayaka Hobara	1			1
37	(Japan) Akari Sato	1			1
37	(Malaysia) Lau Yi Sheng	1			1
37	(Malaysia) Lim Chiew Sien	1			1
37	(Malaysia) Wong Tien Ci	1			1
37	(Malaysia) Yap Rui Chen	1			1
37	(Scotland) Alexander Dunn	1			1
37	(Scotland) Julie MacPherson	1			1
37	(Singapore) Terry Hee	1			1
37	(Singapore) Wesley Koh	1			1
64	(Bulgaria) Evgeni Panev		1		1
64	(Bulgaria) Gabriela Stoeva		1		1
64	(Brazil) Sania Lima		1		1
64	(Brazil) Davi Silva		1		1
64	(Denmark) Amanda Aarrebo Petersen		1		1
64	(Denmark) Otto Reiler		1		1
64	(England) Chloe Birch		1		1
64	(England) Rory Easton		1		1
64	(England) Lizzie Tolman		1		1
64	(England) Ethan van Leeuwen		1		1
64	(Germany) Jones Ralfy Jansen		1		1
64	(Germany) Thuc Phuong Nguyen		1		1
64	(Indonesia) Marwan Faza		1		1
64	(Indonesia) Indah Cahya Sari Jamil		1		1
64	(Kazakhstan) Dmitriy Panarin		1		1
64	(Kazakhstan) Aisha Zhumabek		1		1
64	(Spain) Rubén García		1		1
64	(Spain) Lucía Rodríguez		1		1
64	(Thailand) Phuwanat Horbanluekit		1		1
64	(Thailand) Fungfa Korpthammakit		1		1
64	(Thailand) Nattamon Laisuan		1		1
64	(Thailand) Phatharathorn Nipornram		1		1
64	(Vietnam) Phạm Thị Khánh		1		1
64	(Vietnam) Trần Đình Mạnh		1		1
88	(Canada) Timothy Lock			1	1
88	(Canada) Chloe Hoang			1	1
88	(Denmark) Naja Abildgaard			1	1
88	(Denmark) Mikkel Klinggaard			1	1
88	(Estonia) Kristjan Kaljurand			1	1
88	(Estonia) Helina Rüütel			1	1
88	(France) Lilou Schaffner			1	1
88	(France) Aymeric Tores			1	1
88	(Guatemala) Mariana Paiz			1	1
88	(Malaysia) Tan Wei Liang			1	1
88	(Malaysia) Wong Kha Yan			1	1
88	(Norway) Julie Abusdal			1	1
88	(Norway) Jonas Østhassel			1	1
88	(Poland) Jakub Melaniuk			1	1
88	(Poland) Julia Pławecka			1	1
88	(Slovenia) Miha Ivančič			1	1
88	(Slovenia) Petra Polanc			1	1
88	(South Africa) Caden Kakora			1	1
88	(South Africa) Johanita Scholtz			1	1
88	(Trinidad and Tobago) Chequeda De Boulet			1	1
88	(Trinidad and Tobago) Reece Marcano			1	1
88	(Ukraine) Polina Tkach			1	1
88	(Ukraine) Viacheslav Yakovlev			1	1
