= Swetaparna Panda =

Indian badminton player (born 2005)

Personal information
- Born: 29 June 2005 (age 21) Nayabazar, Cuttack, Odisha, India

Sport
- Country: India
- Sport: Badminton

Women's doubles
- Highest ranking: 31 (with Rutaparna Panda, 1 April 2025)
- Current ranking: 48 (with Rutaparna Panda, 30 June 2026)
- BWF profile

Swetaparna Panda (born 29 June 2005) is an Indian badminton player. Hails from Odisha, she earlier trained at the Gopichand Badminton Academy at Hyderabad and currently trains with her sister and current doubles partner Rutaparna Panda at Cuttack.

== Achievements ==
=== BWF International Challenge/Series (5 titles, 4 runners-up) ===
Women's doubles
Year	Tournament	Partner	Opponent	Score	Result
2022	Réunion Open	(India) Rutaparna Panda	(Germany) Annabella Jäger (Germany) Leona Michalski	21–13, 18–21, 18–21	(silver) Runner-up
2023	Kazakhstan Future Series	(India) Rutaparna Panda	(Indonesia) Nethania Irawan (Indonesia) Fuyu Iwasaki	13–21, 15–21	(silver) Runner-up
2023	Tajikistan International	(India) Rutaparna Panda	(Azerbaijan) Era Maftuha (Azerbaijan) Hajar Nuriyeva	21–3, 21–7	(gold) Winner
2023	Cameroon International	(India) Rutaparna Panda	(Uganda) Husina Kobugabe (Uganda) Gladys Mbabazi	21–16, 21–8	(gold) Winner
2023	Kampala International	(India) Rutaparna Panda	(United Arab Emirates) Aleena Qathun (United Arab Emirates) Nayonika Rajesh	21–9, 21–14	(gold) Winner
2023	Uganda International	(India) Rutaparna Panda	(Uganda) Fadilah Mohamed Rafi (Uganda) Tracy Naluwooza	21–13, 21–8	(gold) Winner
2024	Sri Lanka International	(India) Rutaparna Panda	(Thailand) Pichamon Phatcharaphisutsin (Thailand) Nannapas Sukklad	12–21, 14–21	(silver) Runner-up
2026	Lagos International	(India) Rutaparna Panda	(India) Kavipriya Selvam (India) Simran Singhi	21–14, 25–23	(gold) Winner
2026	Cameroon International	(India) Rutaparna Panda	(India) Kavipriya Selvam (India) Simran Singhi	10–21, 16–21	(silver) Runner-up

BWF International Challenge tournament
BWF International Series tournament
BWF Future Series tournament
