= Rutaparna Panda =

Indian badminton player (born 1999)

Personal information
- Born: 7 May 1999 (age 27) Nayabazar, Cuttack, Odisha, India

Sport
- Country: India
- Sport: Badminton

Women's & mixed doubles
- Highest ranking: 31 (WD with Swetaparna Panda, 1 April 2025); 101 (XD, 12 November 2019)
- Current ranking: 48 (WD with Swetaparna Panda, 30 June 2026)
- BWF profile

Rutaparna Panda (born 7 May 1999) is an Indian badminton player. She was selected to be part of the Indian team for the 2018 Asian Games. Here, she and her partner Arathi Sara Sunil were defeated in the round of 32 by the Thai doubles team. In July 2018, she won the women's doubles title at the All-India senior ranking badminton tournament in Bengaluru. She earlier trained at the Gopichand Badminton Academy at Hyderabad and currently trains with her sister and current doubles partner Swetaparna Panda at Cuttack.

== Achievements ==
=== BWF International Challenge/Series (8 titles, 8 runners-up) ===
Women's doubles
Year	Tournament	Partner	Opponent	Score	Result
2018	Hellas Open	(India) Arathi Sara Sunil	(France) Vimala Hériau (France) Margot Lambert	21–19, 21–12	(gold) Winner
2019	Ghana International	(India) K. Maneesha	(Nigeria) Dorcas Ajoke Adesokan (Nigeria) Uchechukwu Deborah Ukeh	21–11, 21–11	(gold) Winner
2019	Nepal International	(India) K. Maneesha	(Australia) Setyana Mapasa (Australia) Gronya Somerville	10–21, 21–18, 11–21	(silver) Runner-up
2019	Bangladesh International	(India) K. Maneesha	(Malaysia) Pearly Tan (Malaysia) Thinaah Muralitharan	20–22, 19–21	(silver) Runner-up
2021	India International Challenge	(India) Tanisha Crasto	(India) Treesa Jolly (India) Gayathri Gopichand	21–23, 14–21	(silver) Runner-up
2022	Réunion Open	(India) Swetaparna Panda	(Germany) Annabella Jäger (Germany) Leona Michalski	21–13, 18–21, 18–21	(silver) Runner-up
2023	Kazakhstan Future Series	(India) Swetaparna Panda	(Indonesia) Nethania Irawan (Indonesia) Fuyu Iwasaki	13–21, 15–21	(silver) Runner-up
2023	Tajikistan International	(India) Swetaparna Panda	(Azerbaijan) Era Maftuha (Azerbaijan) Hajar Nuriyeva	21–3, 21–7	(gold) Winner
2023	Cameroon International	(India) Swetaparna Panda	(Uganda) Husina Kobugabe (Uganda) Gladys Mbabazi	21–16, 21–8	(gold) Winner
2023	Kampala International	(India) Swetaparna Panda	(United Arab Emirates) Aleena Qathun (United Arab Emirates) Nayonika Rajesh	21–9, 21–14	(gold) Winner
2023	Uganda International	(India) Swetaparna Panda	(Uganda) Fadilah Mohamed Rafi (Uganda) Tracy Naluwooza	21–13, 21–8	(gold) Winner
2024	Sri Lanka International	(India) Swetaparna Panda	(Thailand) Pichamon Phatcharaphisutsin (Thailand) Nannapas Sukklad	12–21, 14–21	(silver) Runner-up
2026	Lagos International	(India) Swetaparna Panda	(India) Kavipriya Selvam (India) Simran Singhi	21–14, 25–23	(gold) Winner
2026	Cameroon International	(India) Swetaparna Panda	(India) Kavipriya Selvam (India) Simran Singhi	10–21, 16–21	(silver) Runner-up

Mixed doubles
Year	Tournament	Partner	Opponent	Score	Result
2019	Ghana International	(India) Ramchandran Shlok	(India) Arjun M.R. (India) K. Maneesha	21–19, 21–15	(gold) Winner
2019	Lagos International	(India) Ramchandran Shlok	(India) Arjun M.R. (India) K. Maneesha	16–21, 17–21	(silver) Runner-up

BWF International Challenge tournament
BWF International Series tournament
BWF Future Series tournament
