= Tajikistan International =

The Tajikistan International is an international badminton tournament held in Tajikistan. The event is part of the Badminton World Federation's International Series and part of the Badminton Asia circuit. It will be held for the first time in 2023.

== Previous winners ==
Year	Men's singles	Women's singles	Men's doubles	Women's doubles	Mixed doubles
2023	(Vietnam) Lê Đức Phát	(India) Anupama Upadhyaya	(Kazakhstan) Khaitmurat Kulmatov (Kazakhstan) Makhsut Tadzhibullaev	(India) Rutaparna Panda (India) Swetaparna Panda	(Kazakhstan) Dmitriy Panarin (Kazakhstan) Kamila Smagulova
2024	No competition				

== Performances by nation ==
As of the 2023 edition

No	Nation	MS	WS	MD	WD	XD	Total
1	India	0	1	0	1	0	2
1	Kazakhstan	0	0	1	0	1	2
3	Vietnam	1	0	0	0	0	1
Total		1	1	1	1	1	5
