= Lê Đức Phát =

Vietnamese badminton player (born 1998)

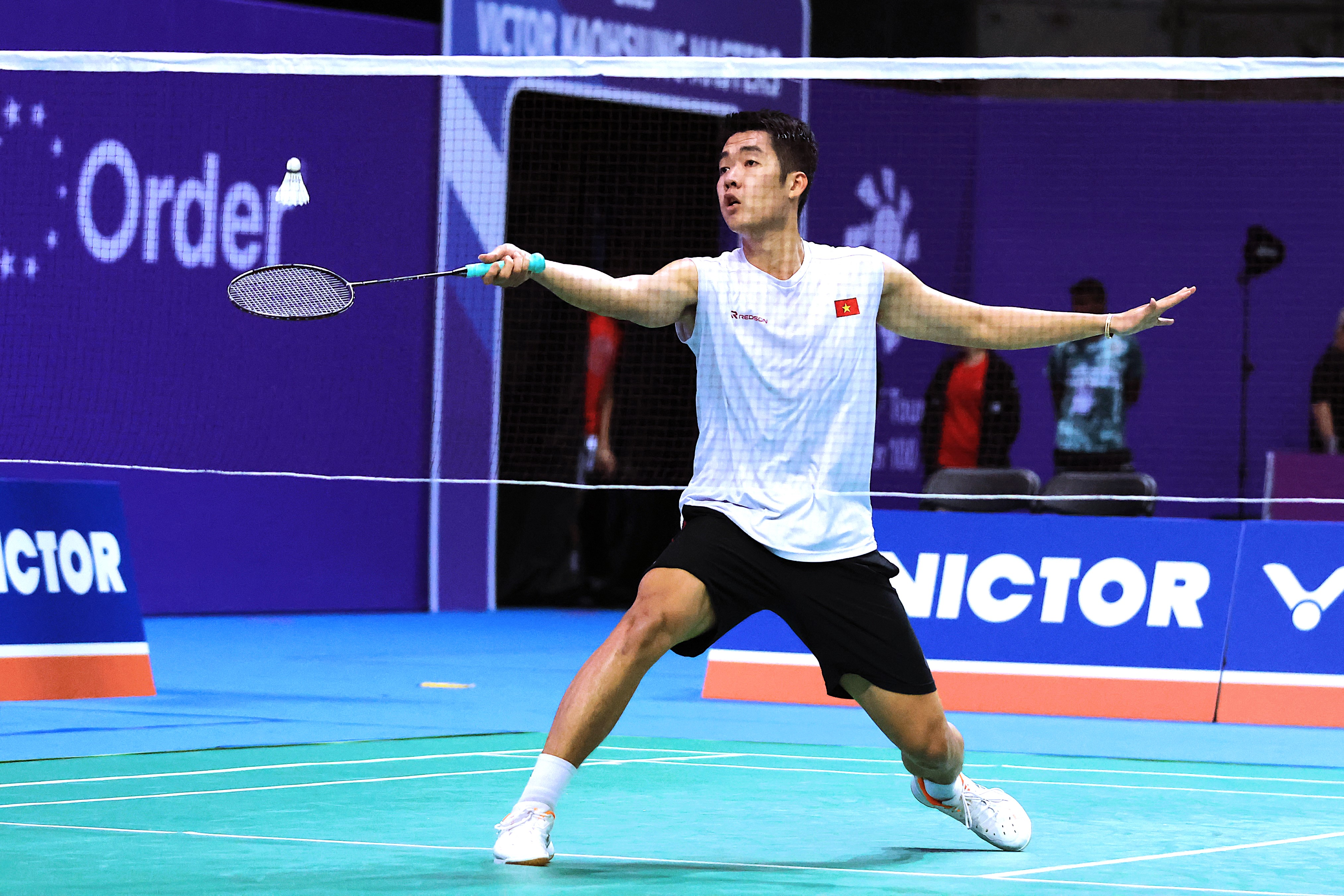
- Đức Phát at the 2023 Kaohsiung Masters

Personal information
- Born: 1 February 1998 (age 28) Đồng Nai, Vietnam
- Height: 180 cm (5 ft 11 in)

Sport
- Country: Vietnam
- Sport: Badminton
- Handedness: Right

Men's singles
- Highest ranking: 55 (4 February 2025)
- Current ranking: 88 (4 November 2025)
- BWF profile

Lê Đức Phát (born 1 February 1998) is a Vietnamese badminton player. He qualified to represent Vietnam at the 2024 Summer Olympics and was chosen his country's flag bearer.

== Biography ==
Đức Phát was born in 1998 in Đồng Nai, Vietnam. His father was a boxer, the Vietnamese national champion from 1988 to 1989. He played several sports growing up, including boxing and football, but ultimately decided to pursue badminton, which was his favorite. He began competing in the sport full-time at age 16 and won his first international tournament in 2017, the Pakistan International. He reached the top 150 of the Badminton World Federation (BWF) rankings in 2018.

However, after achieving the top 150 ranking, Đức Phát suffered injuries and was further limited by the COVID-19 pandemic, causing him to spend significant time away from the sport and resulting in him falling to a ranking of 464 by August 2022. However, he rebounded towards the end of the year, performing well at several tournaments including winning the Vietnamese national championship over Nguyễn Tiến Minh, thus making him the top-ranked Vietnamese badminton player in men's singles.

Đức Phát opened the 2023 season by being runner-up of the Vietnam International Challenge against Takuma Obayashi, and then winning at the Tajikistan International competition as well being runner-up at a tournament in Kazakhstan. He was ranked 86th in the world by February 2024 and that month won the Uganda International, coming back from a 1–9 deficit to defeat Raghu Mariswamy. He reached the semi-finals of the April 2024 Kazakhstan International Challenge and by the end of that month was ranked 74th in the world by the BWF. Đức Phát qualified for the 2024 Summer Olympics by being the 34th-ranked player among those eligible for the men's singles event. He was named one of two flag bearers for Vietnam at the Olympics, along with archer Đỗ Thị Ánh Nguyệt.

== Achievements ==
=== International Challenge / Series (5 titles, 2 runners-up) ===
Men's singles
Year	Tournament	Opponent	Score	Result	Ref.
2017	Pakistan International	(Turkey) Emre Lale	15–21, 21–11, 21–11	(gold) Winner	
2023	Vietnam International Challenge	(Japan) Takuma Obayashi	14–21, 15–21	(silver) Runner-up	
2023	Kazakhstan Future Series	(Kazakhstan) Dmitriy Panarin	15–21, 20–22	(silver) Runner-up	
2023	Tajikistan International	(Israel) Daniil Dubovenko	21–16, 24–22	(gold) Winner	
2024	Uganda International	(India) Raghu Mariswamy	21–18, 21–14	(gold) Winner	
2024	Lagos International	(India) Samarveer Sharma	21–10, 18–21, 22–20	(gold) Winner	
2025 (II)	Vietnam International Series	(Philippines) Jewel Angelo Albo	15–21, 21–13, 21–15	(gold) Winner	

BWF International Challenge tournament
BWF International Series tournament
BWF Future Series tournament
