= Isharani Baruah =

Indian badminton player (born 2004)

Personal information
- Born: 4 January 2004 (age 22) Assam, India

Sport
- Country: India
- Sport: Badminton
- Handedness: Right

Women's singles
- Highest ranking: 36 (7 July 2026)
- Current ranking: 37 (3 November 2026)
- BWF profile

Isharani Baruah (born 4 January 2004) is an Indian badminton player.

== Achievements ==
=== World Tour (2 runners-up) ===
The World Tour was announced in 2017 and implemented in 2018. It is a series of elite badminton tournaments sanctioned by the Badminton World Federation. The tour is divided into levels of Super 1000, Super 750, Super 500, Super 300, and Super 100.

Year	Tournament	Level	Opponent	Score	Result
2025	Odisha Masters	Super 100	(India) Unnati Hooda	17–21, 10–21	(silver) Runner-up
2026	Vietnam Open	Super 100	(Thailand) Sarunrak Vitidsarn	8–21, 15–21	(silver) Runner-up

=== BWF International (5 titles, 2 runners-up) ===
Women's singles
Year	Tournament	Opponent	Score	Result
2023 (I)	India International	(India) Unnati Hooda	13–21, 21–19, 21–11	(gold) Winner
2024	Srilanka International	(India) Rakshitha Ramraj	22–20, 21–14	(gold) Winner
2024	Dutch International	(India) Devika Sihag	19–21, 23–21, 21–14	(gold) Winner
2024	Kazakhstan International	(India) Anupama Upadhyaya	15–21, 16–21	(silver) Runner-up
2024 (I)	India International	(India) Rakshitha Ramraj	21–15, 9–21, 21–17	(gold) Winner
2025	Réunion Open	(India) Shriyanshi Valishetty	21–19, 21–15	(gold) Winner
2025	Malaysia International	(India) Devika Sihag	7–15, 12–15	(silver) Runner-up

BWF International Challenge tournament
BWF International Series tournament
BWF Future Series tournament

=== BWF Junior International (1 runner-up) ===
Girls' singles
Year	Tournament	Opponent	Score	Result
2022	India Junior International	(India) Navya Kanderi	15–21, 18–21	(silver) Runner-up

BWF Junior International Grand Prix tournament
BWF Junior International Challenge tournament
BWF Junior International Series tournament
BWF Junior Future Series tournament
