= Xiaodong Sheng =

Chinese-born Canadian badminton player

Xiaodong Sheng 盛晓东
Personal information
- Born: Sheng Xiaodong; 19 January 1998 (age 28) Tianjin, China

Sport
- Country: Canada
- Sport: Badminton
- Handedness: Right
- Coached by: Li Mao

Men's singles
- Career record: 62 wins, 41 losses
- Highest ranking: 59 (11 February 2020)
- BWF profile

Xiaodong Sheng (Chinese: 盛晓东; pinyin: Shèng Xiǎodōng; born 19 January 1998) is a Chinese-born Canadian badminton player. At the age of 13, Sheng entered the Tianjin provincial team, and selected to join the Chinese national youth team in 2011. At the 2013 Chinese National Junior Championships, he clinched two titles, by winning the boys' singles and doubles event. After retiring from the national youth team, Sheng entered Kawasaki International Badminton Club trained by Li Mao. In his career, he won four international titles, namely Giraldilla International in 2018, Silicon Valley and India International Challenge in 2019, and Iran Fajr International in 2020.

== Achievements ==
=== BWF International Challenge/Series (7 titles, 3 runners-up) ===
Men's singles
Year	Tournament	Opponent	Score	Result
2018	Jamaica International	(Canada) Jason Ho-Shue	6–21, 13–21	(silver) Runner-up
2018	Giraldilla International	(Cuba) Leodannis Martínez	21–17, 21–13	(gold) Winner
2019	Silicon Valley International	(South Korea) Lee Sang-ho	21–14, 21–11	(gold) Winner
2019	India International	(India) Kaushal Dharmamer	21–19, 8–21, 21–14	(gold) Winner
2020	Iran Fajr International	(Belgium) Maxime Moreels	21–17, 21–12	(gold) Winner
2023	Kazakhstan International	(India) Lakshay Sharma	9–21, 21–17, 21–11	(gold) Winner
2024	Sri Lanka International	(India) B. M. Rahul Bharadwaj	10–21, 21–19, 22–20	(gold) Winner
2024	Bangladesh International	(Sri Lanka) Viren Nettasinghe	12–21, 17–21	(silver) Runner-up
2025	Egypt International	(Italy) Giovanni Toti	15–21, 22–20, 20–22	(silver) Runner-up
2026	Perú Future Series	(Canada) Asher Bedi	21–15, 21–17	(gold) Winner

BWF International Challenge tournament
BWF International Series tournament
BWF Future Series tournament
