= Dmitriy Panarin =

Kazakhstani badminton player

Personal information
- Born: Dmitriy Andreyevich Panarin; 8 January 2000 (age 26) Kostanay, Kazakhstan
- Height: 1.78 m (5 ft 10 in)

Sport
- Country: Kazakhstan
- Sport: Badminton

Men's singles & doubles
- Highest ranking: 67 (MS, 27 February 2024); 130 (MD with Artur Niyazov, 28 May 2019); 132 (XD with Kamila Smagulova, 19 March 2024)
- BWF profile

Dmitriy Andreyevich Panarin (Kazakh: Дмитрий Андреевич Панарин; born 8 January 2000) is a Kazakhstani badminton player from Kostanay. He competed in the 2018 Summer Youth Olympics mixed team event.

== Career ==
Panarin won his first international title at the Kazakhstan International in 2018. In 2021, he won his second title at the Cyprus International after beating Tarun Reddy Katam. Outside of singles, he also plays men's doubles with Artur Niyazov and they also won the Kazakhstan International men's doubles title.

Panarin also plays mixed doubles with Kamila Smagulova. They finished up as runners-up at the 2021 Lithuanian International and later won the Botswana International.

Panarin qualified to compete at the 2024 Summer Olympics, and will be the first ever Kazakhstani badminton player at the Olympics.

== Achievements ==
=== BWF International Challenge/Series (15 titles, 7 runners-up) ===
Men's singles
Year	Tournament	Opponent	Score	Result
2018	Kazakhstan International	(Kazakhstan) Artur Niyazov	13–21, 21–14, 21–19	(gold) Winner
2021	Benin International	(India) Aman Farogh Sanjay	13–21, 17–21	(silver) Runner-up
2021	Cyprus International	(India) Tarun Reddy Katam	22–20, 9–21, 21–11	(gold) Winner
2022	Zambia International	(Nigeria) Anuoluwapo Juwon Opeyori	21–9, 21–10	(gold) Winner
2022	Botswana International	(Jordan) Bahaedeen Ahmad Alshannik	21–13, 19–21, 10–21	(silver) Runner-up
2023	Kazakhstan Future Series	(Vietnam) Lê Đức Phát	21–15, 22–20	(gold) Winner
2024	Zambia International	(Azerbaijan) Dicky Dwi Pangestu	21–11, 21–17	(gold) Winner
2025	Cameroon International	(Indonesia) Prahdiska Bagas Shujiwo	13–21, 7–21	(silver) Runner-up
2025	Iran International Khazar (Caspian) Cup	(Iran) Ali Hayati	15–12, 15–6	(gold) Winner
2025	Bangladesh International	(Malaysia) Mohamad Rushdan	21–16, 14–21, 21–10	(gold) Winner
2026	Zambia International	(India) Manav Choudhary	21–19, 14–21, 20–22	(silver) Runner-up

Men's doubles
Year	Tournament	Partner	Opponent	Score	Result
2018	Uganda International	(Kazakhstan) Artur Niyazov	(Jordan) Bahaedeen Ahmad Alshannik (Jordan) Mohd Naser Mansour Nayef	21–18, 21–10	(gold) Winner
2018	Kazakhstan International	(Kazakhstan) Artur Niyazov	(Kazakhstan) Khaitmurat Kulmatov (Russia) Ryhor Varabyou	21–15, 21–11	(gold) Winner
2021	Botswana International	(Kazakhstan) Artur Niyazov	(South Africa) Jarred Elliott (South Africa) Robert Summers	19–21, 21–13, 6–21	(silver) Runner-up
2022	Botswana International	(Kazakhstan) Artur Niyazov	(South Africa) Jarred Elliott (South Africa) Robert Summers	22–20, 21–14	(gold) Winner

Mixed doubles
Year	Tournament	Partner	Opponent	Score	Result
2018	Kazakhstan International	(Russia) Anastasiia Pustinskaia	(Russia) Rodion Kargaev (Russia) Viktoriia Vorobeva	13–21, 18–21	(silver) Runner-up
2021	Lithuanian International	(Kazakhstan) Kamila Smagulova	(Denmark) Mads Vestergaard (Denmark) Clara Løber	12–21, 16–21	(silver) Runner-up
2021	Botswana International	(Kazakhstan) Kamila Smagulova	(Kazakhstan) Artur Niyazov (Kazakhstan) Aisha Zhumabek	21–16, 21–18	(gold) Winner
2023	Tajikistan International	(Kazakhstan) Kamila Smagulova	(Kazakhstan) Khaitmurat Kulmatov (Kazakhstan) Romualda Batyrova	21–8, 21–13	(gold) Winner
2023	Kazakhstan International	(Kazakhstan) Kamila Smagulova	(Kazakhstan) Khaitmurat Kulmatov (Kazakhstan) Aisha Zhumabek	21–18, 12–21, 21–19	(gold) Winner
2024 (II)	Bahrain International	(Kazakhstan) Aisha Zhumabek	(India) Tarun Kona (India) Sri Krishna Priya Kudaravalli	18–21, 21–18, 21–12	(gold) Winner
2025	Iran International Khazar (Caspian) Cup	(Kazakhstan) Nargiza Rakhmetullayeva	(Azerbaijan) Ulvi Huseynov (Azerbaijan) Leyla Jamalzade	15–13, 15–11	(gold) Winner

BWF International Challenge tournament
BWF International Series tournament
BWF Future Series tournament

=== BWF Junior International (9 titles, 4 runners-up) ===
Boys' singles
Year	Tournament	Opponent	Score	Result
2016	Kazakhstan Junior International	(Czech Republic) Cristian Savin	21–18, 11–21, 21–13	(gold) Winner
2016	Turkey Junior International	(Turkey) Murathan Eken	10–21, 21–19, 7–21	(silver) Runner-up
2017	Cyprus Junior International	(Czech Republic) Cristian Savin	18–21, 21–13, 7–21	(silver) Runner-up
2017	Israel Junior International	(Russia) Nikita Fedotovskikh	21–10, 21–12	(gold) Winner
2017	Mongolia Junior International	(Uzbekistan) Temur Turakhonov	21–10, 21–3	(gold) Winner
2017	Kazakhstan Junior International	(Russia) Amir Khamidulin	21–7, 21–9	(gold) Winner
2017	Portuguese Junior International	(Belgium) Julien Carraggi	21–15, 18–21, 14–21	(silver) Runner-up

Men's doubles
Year	Tournament	Partner	Opponent	Score	Result
2016	Kazakhstan Junior International	(Kazakhstan) Ikramzhan Yuldashev	(Uzbekistan) Alexander Kim (Uzbekistan) Ivan Kuzaev	21–14, 21–13	(gold) Winner
2017	Cyprus Junior International	(Kazakhstan) Ikramzhan Yuldashev	(Israel) May Bar Netzer (Israel) Maxim Grinblat	21–16, 21–15	(gold) Winner
2017	Kazakhstan Junior International	(Kazakhstan) Ikramzhan Yuldashev	(Russia) Amir Khamidulin (Russia) Timur Valiullin	21–13, 17–21, 22–20	(gold) Winner

Mixed doubles
Year	Tournament	Partner	Opponent	Score	Result
2016	Kazakhstan Junior International	(Kazakhstan) Yelizaveta Kharchenko	(Russia) Amir Khamidulin (Russia) Mariya Malygina	21–12, 21–18	(gold) Winner
2017	Kazakhstan Junior International	(Russia) Anastasiia Pustinskaia	(Russia) Amir Khamidulin (Russia) Mariya Malygina	21–6, 22–20	(gold) Winner
2017	Turkey Junior International	(Russia) Anastasiia Pustinskaia	(Turkey) Emre Sönmez (Turkey) Bengisu Erçetin	15–21, 19–21	(silver) Runner-up

BWF Junior International Grand Prix tournament
BWF Junior International Challenge tournament
BWF Junior International Series tournament
BWF Junior Future Series tournament
