= Kavipriya Selvam =

Indian badminton player

Personal information
- Born: 2 February 2003 (age 23) Puducherry, India

Sport
- Country: India
- Sport: Badminton

Women's doubles
- Highest ranking: 38 (with Simran Singhi, 16 June 2026)
- Current ranking: 41 (with Simran Singhi, 27 October 2026)
- BWF profile (archived)

Kavipriya Selvam (born 2 February 2003) is an Indian badminton player who competes primarily in the women's doubles. She represents India in international competitions and has partnered with Simran Singhi. The pair qualified for and made their debut at the 2026 BWF World Championships in New Delhi.

== Early life and junior career ==
Kavipriya was born on 2 February 2003 and is from Puducherry. She began playing badminton at the age of seven after her mother took her to a badminton centre. Coach R. Ganapathy Vivekanandan subsequently began training her with senior players.

She became one of the leading junior players in Puducherry. In 2015, she won the Under-13, Under-15, Under-17, Under-19 and senior singles titles in the local circuit. She again won the Under-15, Under-17, Under-19 and senior singles titles in 2016.

In June 2016, Kavipriya joined the Pullela Gopichand Badminton Academy after being selected through the Sports Authority of India.

== Career ==
Kavipriya initially competed mainly in women's singles and established herself on the domestic junior circuit. A major injury later interrupted her singles career and led her to shift her focus to doubles.

She subsequently formed a women's doubles partnership with Simran Singhi. The pair began playing together in Nagpur and made rapid progress on the international circuit. In 2026, they won the Lagos International Classics and finished runners-up at the Uganda International Challenge. Their results helped them qualify for the World Championships.

Kavipriya was also selected for India's women's squad at the 2026 Thomas & Uber Cup.

== 2026 World Championships ==
Kavipriya and Simran Singhi qualified for the women's doubles competition at the 2026 BWF World Championships, held in New Delhi. It was the first World Championship appearance for both players.

The pair entered the tournament after becoming India's second-ranked women's doubles pair and recording podium finishes on the international circuit.

== Playing style ==
Kavipriya is right-handed. She competed primarily as a singles player during her junior career before moving into women's doubles following an injury. Her partnership with Simran Singhi became her main international event during the 2026 season.

== Achievements ==
Tournament	Year	Event	Partner	Result
Lagos International Classics	2026	Women's doubles	Simran Singhi	Winner
Uganda International Challenge	2026	Women's doubles	Simran Singhi	Runner-up
Cameroon International	2026	Women's doubles	Simran Singhi	Winner
