= Simran Singhi =

Indian badminton player

Personal information
- Born: April 11, 2002 (age 24) Mumbai, Maharashtra, India

Sport
- Country: India
- Sport: Badminton

Women's doubles
- Highest ranking: 38 (with Kavipriya Selvam, 16 June 2026)
- Current ranking: 41 (with Kavipriya Selvam, 27 October 2026)

Simran Singhi (born 11 April 2002) is an Indian badminton player who competes primarily in the women's doubles. She has represented India in international competitions and has partnered with Kavipriya Selvam.

== Early life and education ==
Singhi was born on 11 April 2002 in Mumbai, Maharashtra. She began playing badminton at a young age and trained under coach Uday Pawar at Goregaon Sports Club in Mumbai.

== Career ==
Singhi initially competed in women's doubles with Ritika Thaker. The pair became one of India's successful junior combinations and won the women's doubles title at the Junior National Badminton Championships in 2019. In 2020, they entered the BWF world top 100, reaching No. 98 in the rankings.

Singhi later competed with different partners before forming a partnership with Kavipriya Selvam. The pair competed together internationally and won the Lagos International Classics. Their performances helped them qualify for the 2026 BWF World Championships in New Delhi.

At the 2026 World Championships, Singhi and Selvam made their debut at the tournament and defeated Spain's Nikol Carulla and Carmen Maria Jimenez in the opening round, 22–20, 21–14. They were subsequently eliminated in the round of 32 by Bulgaria's Gabriela Stoeva and Stefani Stoeva.

== Achievements ==
Year	Tournament	Event	Partner	Result
2019	Junior National Badminton Championships	Girls' doubles	Ritika Thaker	Winner
2023; 2024	Lagos International	Women's doubles	Kavipriya Selvam	Winner
