= Kazakhstan International =

International badminton tournament

The Kazakhstan International is an international badminton tournament held in Kazakhstan. This tournament established in 2015 and part of the Badminton World Federation's BWF International Series of Badminton Asia Circuit.

== Past winners ==
=== Kazakhstan International ===
Year	Men's singles	Women's singles	Men's doubles	Women's doubles	Mixed doubles
2015	(Russia) Vladimir Malkov	(Russia) Evgeniya Kosetskaya	(Malaysia) Lim Ming Chuen (Malaysia) Ong Wei Khoon	(Russia) Tatjana Bibik (Russia) Ksenia Polikarpova	(Russia) Anatoliy Yartsev (Russia) Evgeniya Kosetskaya
2016– 2017	No competition				
2018	(Kazakhstan) Dmitriy Panarin	(Russia) Anastasia Redkina	(Kazakhstan) Artur Niyazov (Kazakhstan) Dmitriy Panarin	(Russia) Ekaterina Kadochnikova (Russia) Anastasia Redkina	(Russia) Rodion Kargaev (Russia) Viktoriia Vorobeva
2019	(Denmark) Ditlev Jaeger Holm	(Russia) Natalia Perminova	(Denmark) Jeppe Bruun (Denmark) Ditlev Jaeger Holm	(Russia) Viktoriia Kozyreva (Russia) Mariia Sukhova	(Denmark) Jeppe Bruun (Denmark) Irina Amalie Andersen
2020	Cancelled (Note: This tournament, originally to be played from 4 to 8 November, was later postponed due to COVID-19 pandemic in Kazakhstan.)				
2021– 2022	No competition				
2023	(Canada) Xiaodong Sheng	(Philippines) Mikaela de Guzman	(India) Arryan R Aji (India) Syam Prasad Udayakumar	(Kazakhstan) Nargiza Rakhmetullayeva (Kazakhstan) Aisha Zhumabek	(Kazakhstan) Dmitriy Panarin (Kazakhstan) Kamila Smagulova
2024	(India) Tharun Mannepalli	(India) Anupama Upadhyaya	(France) Lucas Corvée (France) Ronan Labar	(Japan) Kaho Osawa (Japan) Mai Tanabe	(Malaysia) Wong Tien Ci (Malaysia) Lim Chiew Sien
2025	(Indonesia) Muhamad Yusuf	(Indonesia) Thalita Ramadhani Wiryawan	(Indonesia) Muhammad Rian Ardianto (Indonesia) Rahmat Hidayat	(Ukraine) Polina Buhrova (Ukraine) Yevheniia Kantemyr	(Indonesia) Bimo Prasetyo (Indonesia) Thesya Munggaran

=== Kazakhstan Future Series ===
Year	Men's singles	Women's singles	Men's doubles	Women's doubles	Mixed doubles
2023	(Kazakhstan) Dmitriy Panarin	(India) Jiya Rawat	(Philippines) Solomon Padiz Jr. (Philippines) Julius Villabrille	(Indonesia) Nethania Irawan (Indonesia) Fuyu Iwasaki	(Israel) Maxim Grinblat (Israel) Anna Kirillova
2024– 2025	No competition				

== Performances by countries ==
=== Kazakhstan International ===
As of 2025 edition

Top countries
Pos	Country	MS	WS	MD	WD	XD	Total
1	Russia	1	3	0	3	2	9
2	Indonesia	1	1	1	0	1	4
2	Kazakhstan	1	0	1	1	1	4
4	Denmark	1	0	1	0	1	3
4	India	1	1	1	0	0	3
6	Malaysia	0	0	1	0	1	2
7	Canada	1	0	0	0	0	1
7	France	0	0	1	0	0	1
7	Japan	0	0	0	1	0	1
7	Philippines	0	1	0	0	0	1
7	Ukraine	0	0	0	1	0	1
Total		6	6	6	6	6	30

=== Kazakhstan Future Series ===
As of the 2023 edition

Top countries
Pos	Country	MS	WS	MD	WD	XD	Total
1	India	0	1	0	0	0	1
1	Indonesia	0	0	0	1	0	1
1	Israel	0	0	0	0	1	1
1	Kazakhstan	1	0	0	0	0	1
1	Philippines	0	0	1	0	0	1
Total		1	1	1	1	1	5
