= 2016 Scottish Open Grand Prix =

Tournament details
- Dates: 23 – 27 November 2016
- Level: Grand Prix Gold
- Total prize money: US$55,000
- Venue: Emirates Arena
- Location: Glasgow, Scotland

Champions
- Men's singles: (Denmark) Anders Antonsen
- Women's singles: (Denmark) Mette Poulsen
- Men's doubles: (Denmark) Mathias Christiansen (Denmark) David Daugaard
- Women's doubles: (Malaysia) Lim Yin Loo (Malaysia) Yap Cheng Wen
- Mixed doubles: (Malaysia) Goh Soon Huat (Malaysia) Shevon Jemie Lai

The 2016 Scottish Open Grand Prix was the 20th grand prix's badminton tournament of the 2016 BWF Grand Prix Gold and Grand Prix. The tournament was held at Emirates Arena in Glasgow, Scotland 23–27 November 2016 and had a total purse of $55,000.

== Men's singles ==
=== Seeds ===
1. (Chinese Taipei) Hsu Jen-hao (second round)
2. (Denmark) Anders Antonsen (champion)
3. (Denmark) Emil Holst (quarterfinals)
4. (Sweden) Henri Hurskainen (semifinals)
5. (Estonia) Raul Must (second round)
6. (India) Sourabh Varma (quarterfinals)
7. (France) Lucas Corvee (third round)
8. (India) Anand Pawar (first round)
9. (France) Lucas Claerbout (third round)
10. (France) Thomas Rouxel (first round)
11. (Sri Lanka) Niluka Karunaratne (withdrew)
12. (Denmark) Kim Bruun (third round)
13. (Scotland) Kieran Merrilees (third round)
14. (Austria) Luka Wraber (third round)
15. (Malaysia) Soong Joo Ven (final)
16. (Netherlands) Nick Fransman (third round)

=== Finals ===
Quarterfinals
(Netherlands) Mark Caljouw	19	21	11
15	(Malaysia) Soong Joo Ven	21	9	21
3	(Denmark) Emil Holst	21	21	18
(Germany) Fabian Roth	23	12	21
6	(India) Sourabh Varma	17	18
4	(Sweden) Henri Hurskainen	21	21
(Denmark) Rasmus Gemke	19	21	10
2	(Denmark) Anders Antonsen	21	15	21

Semifinals
15	(Malaysia) Soong Joo Ven	21	21
(Germany) Fabian Roth	12	11
4	(Sweden) Henri Hurskainen	19	21	19
2	(Denmark) Anders Antonsen	21	14	21

Final
15	(Malaysia) Soong Joo Ven	20	14
2	(Denmark) Anders Antonsen	22	21

=== Top half ===
==== Section 1 ====
First Round
1	(Chinese Taipei) Hsu J-h	21	21
PFQ	(England) J Torjussen	15	7
(India) L Sarang	18	10
(Netherlands) M Caljouw	21	21
13	(Scotland) K Merrilees	21	21
Q1	(England) Y Wang	11	10
(Germany) K Schaefar	13	15
(Chinese Taipei) Kuo C-h	21	21

Second Round
1	(Chinese Taipei) Hsu J-h	19	18
(Netherlands) M Caljouw	21	21
13	(Scotland) K Merrilees	21	21
(Chinese Taipei) Kuo C-h	13	13

Third Round
(Netherlands) M Caljouw	25	18	21
13	(Scotland) K Merrilees	23	21	16

==== Section 2 ====
First Round
8	(India) A Pawar	12	14^{r}
(England) S Parsons	21	15
PFQ	(England) R Green	7	18
(Switzerland) M Bonny	21	21
15	(Malaysia) Soong J V	21	22
(Chinese Taipei) Chi Y-j	10	20
Q7	(China) Wu SJ	21	21
PFQ	(Czech Republic) J Janacek	14	13

Second Round
(England) S Parsons	21	15	21
(Switzerland) M Bonny	14	21	13
15	(Malaysia) Soong J V	21	21
Q7	(China) Wu SJ	13	16

Third Round
(England) S Parsons	21	15	15
15	(Malaysia) Soong J V	16	21	21

==== Section 3 ====
First Round
3	(Denmark) E Holst	21	21
PFQ	(Belgium) S De Langhe	11	10
(Scotland) A Dunn	15	21	17
(England) A Marritt	21	19	21
12	(Denmark) K Bruun	21	21
Q4	(England) H Ngan	18	12
(Luxembourg) R Mann	13	8
(England) R Walker	21	21

Second Round
3	(Denmark) E Holst	21	21
(England) A Marritt	15	8
12	(Denmark) K Bruun	21	21
(England) R Walker	16	11

Third Round
3	(Denmark) E Holst	21	21
12	(Denmark) K Bruun	17	17

==== Section 4 ====
First Round
7	(France) L Corvee	21	21
Q8	(Canada) F Deblois-Beaucage	10	5
(Poland) M Dubowski	21	21
(Scotland) B Torrance	13	14
10	(France) T Rouxel	13	14
(Germany) F Roth	21	21
(South Africa) P Vijayanath	17	23	11
(Austria) V Vattanirappel	21	21	21

Second Round
7	(France) L Corvee	21	21
(Poland) M Dubowski	8	18
(Germany) F Roth	21	21
(Austria) V Vattanirappel	17	8

Third Round
7	(France) L Corvee	10	22	18
(Germany) F Roth	21	20	21

=== Bottom half ===
==== Section 5 ====
First Round
(England) J Douse	17	10
(Germany) L Schaenzler	21	21
(England) M Spencer-Smith	6	7
9	(France) L Claerbout	21	21
(France) P Cajot	14	21	15
(India) S Dey	21	16	21
Q3	(England) A Wainwright	16	14
6	(India) S Varma	21	21

Second Round
(Germany) L Schaenzler	21	9	13
9	(France) L Claerbout	17	21	21
(India) S Dey	21	21	17
6	(India) S Varma	23	16	21

Third Round
9	(France) L Claerbout	21	17	12
6	(India) S Varma	15	21	21

==== Section 6 ====
First Round
(Austria) R Gnedt	16	15
(Scotland) M Carder	21	21
(United States) B Seguin	17	21	22
PFQ	(Wales) D Font	21	11	20
(Croatia) Z Durkinjak	16	17
(Canada) B. R. Sankeerth	21	21
(Mexico) J Castillo	12	11
4	(Sweden) H Hurskainen	21	21

Second Round
(Scotland) M Carder	13	13
(United States) B Seguin	21	21
(Canada) B. R. Sankeerth	10	17
4	(Sweden) H Hurskainen	21	21

Third Round
(United States) B Seguin	9	21	16
4	(Sweden) H Hurskainen	21	18	21

==== Section 7 ====
First Round
Q2	(England) J Mcdonald	12	6
(Austria) W Gnedt	21	21
(Czech Republic) L Zevl	8	28
14	(Austria) L Wraber	21	30
(Denmark) R Gemke	21	21
PFQ	(England) L Pearce	11	10
Q5	(Malaysia) Woon K H	21	14	13
5	(Estonia) R Must	16	21	21

Second Round
(Austria) W Gnedt	16	21	11
14	(Austria) L Wraber	21	17	21
(Denmark) R Gemke	21	19	21
5	(Estonia) R Must	17	21	15

Third Round
14	(Austria) L Wraber	12	15
(Denmark) R Gemke	21	21

==== Section 8 ====
First Round
(Republic of Ireland) J Magee	14	17
(Malaysia) Soo T Z	21	21
Q6	(Scotland) C Grimley	15	25
16	(Netherlands) N Fransman	21	27
(Germany) J Persson	11	10
(Chinese Taipei) Lu C-h	21	21
PFQ	(England) D Jones	14	10
2	(Denmark) A Antonsen	21	21

Second Round
(Malaysia) Soo T Z	15	21	8
16	(Netherlands) N Fransman	21	18	21
(Chinese Taipei) Lu C-h	14	11
2	(Denmark) A Antonsen	21	21

Third Round
16	(Netherlands) N Fransman	12	13
2	(Denmark) A Antonsen	21	21

== Women's singles ==
=== Seeds ===
1. (Denmark) Natalia Koch Rohde (quarterfinals)
2. (France) Delphine Lansac (withdrew)
3. (Denmark) Mette Poulsen (champion)
4. (India) Tanvi Lad (first round)
5. (Denmark) Mia Blichfeldt (semifinals)
6. (Switzerland) Sabrina Jaquet (final)
7. (Austria) Elisabeth Baldauf (quarterfinals)
8. (Denmark) Julie Finne-Ipsen (semifinals)

=== Finals ===
Semifinals
6	(Switzerland) Sabrina Jaquet	13	22	23
5	(Denmark) Mia Blichfeldt	21	20	21
3	(Denmark) Mette Poulsen	21	21
8	(Denmark) Julie Finne-Ipsen	14	9

Final
6	(Switzerland) Sabrina Jaquet	18	21	14
3	(Denmark) Mette Poulsen	21	17	21

=== Top half ===
==== Section 1 ====
First Round
1	(Denmark) N K Rohde	21	21
Q4	(Sweden) E Soderstrom	18	17
(Bulgaria) M Mitsova	21	21
(Czech Republic) K Tomalova	13	14
6	(Switzerland) S Jaquet	21	21
(England) L J Powell	16	14
(England) G Bland	13	16
(Chinese Taipei) Sung S-y	21	21

Second Round
1	(Denmark) N K Rohde	21	21
(Bulgaria) M Mitsova	14	16
6	(Switzerland) S Jaquet	21	21
(Chinese Taipei) Sung S-y	14	16

Quarterfinals
1	(Denmark) N K Rohde	6	21	10
6	(Switzerland) S Jaquet	21	13	21

==== Section 2 ====
First Round
4	(India) T Lad	14	21	12
(Germany) F Deprez	21	12	21
Q3	(England) P Riou	21	21
(Canada) R Honderich	17	10
5	(Denmark) M Blichfeldt	21	21
Q2	(Scotland) H Newall	18	15
(England) C Birch	21	15	21
(Wales) J Hart	9	21	16

Second Round
(Germany) F Deprez	21	21
Q3	(England) P Riou	14	16
5	(Denmark) M Blichfeldt	21	14	21
(England) C Birch	16	21	14

Quarterfinals
(Germany) F Deprez	13	21	7
5	(Denmark) M Blichfeldt	21	18	21

=== Bottom half ===
==== Section 3 ====
First Round
(England) N Cerfontyne	21	21
Q1	(England) C E Marritt	13	5
(England) T Lau	12	13
7	(Austria) E Baldauf	21	21
(Netherlands) G Mahulette	15	11
(England) F M Chapman	21	21
(England) M Ngan	21	9	12
3	(Denmark) M Poulsen	19	21	21

Second Round
(England) N Cerfontyne	16	12
7	(Austria) E Baldauf	21	21
(England) F M Chapman	21	16	19
3	(Denmark) M Poulsen	18	21	21

Quarterfinals
7	(Austria) E Baldauf	11	12
3	(Denmark) M Poulsen	21	21

==== Section 4 ====
First Round
(Germany) Y Li	20	21	18
(India) S Rane	22	15	21
WC	(Scotland) C Torrance	10	15
8	(Denmark) J Finne-Ipsen	21	21
(Germany) L Heim	21	21
(Czech Republic) Z Pavelkova	14	18
(India) A Pantawane	21	21
PFQ	(Ukraine) M Ilyinskaya	11	18

Second Round
(India) S Rane	22	18	17
8	(Denmark) J Finne-Ipsen	20	21	21
(Germany) L Heim	21	16	21
(India) A Pantawane	16	21	19

Quarterfinals
8	(Denmark) J Finne-Ipsen	21	21
(Germany) L Heim	18	19

== Men's doubles ==
=== Seeds ===
1. (Denmark) Mathias Christiansen / David Daugaard (champion)
2. (Belgium) Matijs Dierickx / Freek Golinski (first round)
3. (Germany) Raphael Beck / Peter Kaesbauer (first round)
4. (Chinese Taipei) Liao Kuan-hao / Lu Chia-pin (semifinals)
5. (India) Akshay Dewalkar / Kona Tarun (first round)
6. (Republic of Ireland) Joshua Magee / Sam Magee (quarterfinals)
7. (India) Jishnu Sanyal / Shivam Sharma (second round)
8. (England) Matthew Nottingham / Harley Towler (quarterfinals)

=== Finals ===
Semifinals
1	(Denmark) Mathias Christiansen (Denmark) David Daugaard	21	16	21
4	(Chinese Taipei) Liao Kuan-hao (Chinese Taipei) Lu Chia-pin	14	21	11
(Scotland) Adam Hall (England) Peter Mills	21	18	21
PFQ	(Netherlands) Jelle Maas (Netherlands) Robin Tabeling	19	21	19

Final
1	(Denmark) Mathias Christiansen (Denmark) David Daugaard	15	21	21
(Scotland) Adam Hall (England) Peter Mills	21	19	15

=== Top half ===
==== Section 1 ====
First Round
1	(Denmark) M Christiansen (Denmark) D Daugaard	21	21
(Poland) M Bochat (Poland) A Cwalina	13	14
(England) A Marritt (England) N Rossiter	15	14
Q4	(China) Li JQ (China) Liu ZR	21	21
8	(England) M Nottingham (England) H Towler	21	21
Q4	(India) K. Nandagopal (India) S Shukla	17	15
(Canada) A Liu (Canada) T Ng	22	20	17
(Malaysia) Tan C T (Malaysia) Tan W G	20	22	21

Second Round
1	(Denmark) M Christiansen (Denmark) D Daugaard	21	21	21
Q4	(China) Li JQ (China) Liu ZR	10	23	14
8	(England) M Nottingham (England) H Towler	22	21
(Malaysia) Tan C T (Malaysia) Tan W G	20	17

Quarterfinals
1	(Denmark) M Christiansen (Denmark) D Daugaard	21	21
8	(England) M Nottingham (England) H Towler	16	17

==== Section 2 ====
First Round
4	(Chinese Taipei) Liao K-h (Chinese Taipei) Lu C-p	21	21
(Scotland) M Campbell (Scotland) P MacHugh	14	17
(Austria) D Stipsits (Austria) R Zirnwald	10	13
Q1	(France) R Labar (France) G Mittelheisser	21	21
5	(India) A Dewalkar (India) K Tarun	0^{r}
(England) C Coles (England) G Mairs	2
(Denmark) A Bond (Denmark) N Overgaard	21	21
(England) R Golding (England) V Liew	15	10

Second Round
4	(Chinese Taipei) Liao K-h (Chinese Taipei) Lu C-p	21	21
Q1	(France) R Labar (France) G Mittelheisser	17	19
(England) C Coles (England) G Mairs	17	19
(Denmark) A Bond (Denmark) N Overgaard	21	21

Quarterfinals
4	(Chinese Taipei) Liao K-h (Chinese Taipei) Lu C-p	21	21
(Denmark) A Bond (Denmark) N Overgaard	8	18

=== Bottom half ===
==== Section 3 ====
First Round
(New Zealand) O Leydon-Davis (Denmark) L Moelhede	16	21	21
(England) B Lane (England) S Vendy	21	19	17
PFQ	(England) M Drabble (England) M Roe	21	8	17
7	(India) J Sanyal (India) S Sharma	18	21	21
(Netherlands) J Arends (Netherlands) R Jille	21	21
(Denmark) F Colberg (Denmark) R Fladberg	15	14
(Scotland) A Hall (England) P Mills	21	21
3	(Germany) R Beck (Germany) P Kaesbauer	14	15

Second Round
(New Zealand) O Leydon-Davis (Denmark) L Moelhede	21	21
7	(India) J Sanyal (India) S Sharma	14	13
(Netherlands) J Arends (Netherlands) R Jille	16	21	11
(Scotland) A Hall (England) P Mills	21	18	21

Quarterfinals
(New Zealand) O Leydon-Davis (Denmark) L Moelhede	17	18
(Scotland) A Hall (England) P Mills	21	21

==== Section 4 ====
First Round
PFQ	(Mexico) J Castillo (Germany) J Persson	21	15	15
(Switzerland) M Bonny (Switzerland) O Schaller	16	21	21
(England) Z Russ (England) S Stallwood	12	10
6	(Republic of Ireland) J Magee (Republic of Ireland) S Magee	21	21
(France) B Kersaudy (France) J Maio	21	20	21
Q3	(France) B Geiss (France) F Holzer	19	22	16
PFQ	(Netherlands) J Maas (Netherlands) R Tabeling	21	21
2	(Belgium) M Dierickx (Belgium) F Golinski	17	12

Second Round
(Switzerland) M Bonny (Switzerland) O Schaller	17	16
6	(Republic of Ireland) J Magee (Republic of Ireland) S Magee	21	21
(France) B Kersaudy (France) J Maio	18	17
PFQ	(Netherlands) J Maas (Netherlands) R Tabeling	21	21

Quarterfinals
6	(Republic of Ireland) J Magee (Republic of Ireland) S Magee	9	20
PFQ	(Netherlands) J Maas (Netherlands) R Tabeling	21	22

== Women's doubles ==
=== Seeds ===
1. (Netherlands) Eefje Muskens / Selena Piek (withdrew)
2. (Australia) Setyana Mapasa / Gronya Somerville (first round)
3. (Denmark) Maiken Fruergaard / Sara Thygesen (quarterfinals)
4. (Denmark) Julie Finne-Ipsen / Rikke Søby Hansen (semifinals)

=== Finals ===
Semifinals
(Malaysia) Amelia Alicia Anscelly (Malaysia) Teoh Mei Xing	21	21
(England) Lauren Smith (England) Sarah Walker	18	17
4	(Denmark) Julie Finne-Ipsen (Denmark) Rikke Søby Hansen	16	16
(Malaysia) Lim Yin Loo (Malaysia) Yap Cheng Wen	21	21

Final
(Malaysia) Amelia Alicia Anscelly (Malaysia) Teoh Mei Xing	17	13
(Malaysia) Lim Yin Loo (Malaysia) Yap Cheng Wen	21	21

=== Top half ===
==== Section 1 ====
First Round
1	(Netherlands) E Muskens (Netherlands) S Piek
BYE
(England) R Allen (England) S Males	11	12
(Scotland) R Findlay (Scotland) C Pringle	21	21
(England) J Pugh (England) E Westwood	20	12
(Malaysia) A A Anscelly (Malaysia) Teoh M X	22	21
(France) L Baumann (France) A Fontaine	22	16	21
(England) E Burbidge (England) Z King	20	21	7

Second Round
1	(Netherlands) E Muskens (Netherlands) S Piek
(Scotland) R Findlay (Scotland) C Pringle	w	/	o
(Malaysia) A A Anscelly (Malaysia) Teoh M X	21	26
(France) L Baumann (France) A Fontaine	16	24

Quarterfinals
(Scotland) R Findlay (Scotland) C Pringle	5	14
(Malaysia) A A Anscelly (Malaysia) Teoh M X	21	21

==== Section 2 ====
First Round
3	(Denmark) M Fruergaard (Denmark) S Thygesen	21	21
(Australia) L Choo (Canada) R Honderich	17	10
(Scotland) K Berry (Scotland) H Newall	21	9	10
(England) J Moore (England) V Williams	15	21	21
(Germany) I Herttrich (Germany) C Nelte	w	/	o
(England) F Liew (England) L Tolman
(England) L Smith (England) S Walker	22	21
(Switzerland) N Fankhauser (Malaysia) S Saniru	20	10

Second Round
3	(Denmark) M Fruergaard (Denmark) S Thygesen	21	21
(England) J Moore (England) V Williams	15	7
(Germany) I Herttrich (Germany) C Nelte	21	16	18
(England) L Smith (England) S Walker	10	21	21

Quarterfinals
3	(Denmark) M Fruergaard (Denmark) S Thygesen	19	16
(England) L Smith (England) S Walker	21	21

=== Bottom half ===
==== Section 3 ====
First Round
(Germany) E Janssens (Germany) J Karnott	21	21	9
(Switzerland) C Burkart (Switzerland) S Jaquet	15	23	21
(Germany) L Efler (Germany) L Kaepplein	21	24
(Scotland) L Middleton (Scotland) S Sidebottom	12	22
(England) M Chapman (England) F Patel-Redfearn	12	12
(Scotland) J MacPherson (Scotland) E O'Donnell	21	21
(England) Butler (England) T-Y Lau	11	6
4	(Denmark) J Finne-Ipsen (Denmark) R Søby Hansen	21	21

Second Round
(Switzerland) C Burkart (Switzerland) S Jaquet	w	/	o
(Germany) L Efler (Germany) L Kaepplein
(Scotland) J MacPherson (Scotland) E O'Donnell	8	10
4	(Denmark) J Finne-Ipsen (Denmark) R Søby Hansen	21	21

Quarterfinals
(Switzerland) C Burkart (Switzerland) S Jaquet	10	10
4	(Denmark) J Finne-Ipsen (Denmark) R Søby Hansen	21	21

==== Section 4 ====
First Round
(England) N Gresty (England) J Hopton	16	17
(Netherlands) C Seinen (Netherlands) I Tabeling	21	21
(France) E Lefel (France) A Tran	14	21	15
(Bulgaria) M Mitsova (Bulgaria) P Nedelcheva	21	15	21
(Malaysia) Lim Y L (Malaysia) Yap C W	21	16	21
(England) C Birch (England) S Brown	11	21	14
(India) A Ponnappa (India) N. S Reddy	21	13	21
2	(Australia) S Mapasa (Australia) G Somerville	16	21	13

Second Round
(Netherlands) C Seinen (Netherlands) I Tabeling	21	16	21
(Bulgaria) M Mitsova (Bulgaria) P Nedelcheva	18	21	16
(Malaysia) Lim Y L (Malaysia) Yap C W	21	21
(India) A Ponnappa (India) N. S Reddy	11	13

Quarterfinals
(Netherlands) C Seinen (Netherlands) I Tabeling	13	18
(Malaysia) Lim Y L (Malaysia) Yap C W	21	21

== Mixed doubles ==
=== Seeds ===
1. (India) Pranaav Jerry Chopra / N. Sikki Reddy (final)
2. (Sweden) Nico Ruponen / Amanda Hogstrom (withdrew)
3. (Republic of Ireland) Sam Magee / Chloe Magee (second round)
4. (Australia) Sawan Serasinghe / Setyana Mapasa (first round)
5. (France) Ronan Labar / Audrey Fontaine (quarterfinals)
6. (Chinese Taipei) Chang Ko-chi / Chang Hsin-tien (quarterfinals)
7. (Denmark) Soren Gravholt / Maiken Fruergaard (first round)
8. (England) Ben Lane / Jessica Pugh (quarterfinals)

=== Finals ===
Semifinals
1	(India) Pranaav Jerry Chopra (India) N. Sikki Reddy	21	23
Q3	(Denmark) Mathias Christiansen (Denmark) Sara Thygesen	18	21
Q1	(Malaysia) Goh Soon Huat (Malaysia) Shevon Jemie Lai	16	21	21
PFQ	(France) Gaetan Mittelheisser (France) Emilie Lefel	21	17	18

Final
1	(India) Pranaav Jerry Chopra (India) N. Sikki Reddy	21	18	16
Q1	(Malaysia) Goh Soon Huat (Malaysia) Shevon Jemie Lai	13	21	21

=== Top half ===
==== Section 1 ====
First Round
1	(India) P J Chopra (India) N. S Reddy	21	21
(Netherlands) J Maas (Netherlands) I Van Der Aar	16	17
PFQ	(Scotland) A Dunn (England) E Burbidge	11	16
(New Zealand) O Leydon-Davis (Australia) G Somerville	21	21
8	(England) B Lane (England) J Pugh	24	21
(France) J Maio (France) L Baumann	22	9
Q2	(Germany) R Beck (Germany) C Nelte	19	25	21
(England) S Vendy (England) E Westwood	21	23	17

Second Round
1	(India) P J Chopra (India) N. S Reddy	21	21
(New Zealand) O Leydon-Davis (Australia) G Somerville	13	15
8	(England) B Lane (England) J Pugh	19	21	21
Q2	(Germany) R Beck (Germany) C Nelte	21	19	11

Quarterfinals
1	(India) P J Chopra (India) N. S Reddy	21	21
8	(England) B Lane (England) J Pugh	13	14

==== Section 2 ====
First Round
4	(Australia) S Serasinghe (Australia) S Mapasa	19	21	19
(England) C Coles (England) V Williams	21	15	21
(Poland) P Pietryja (Poland) A Wojtkowska	15	7
Q3	(Denmark) M Christiansen (Denmark) S Thygesen	21	21
6	(Chinese Taipei) Chang K-c (Chinese Taipei) Chang H-t	22	21
(Czech Republic) J Janacek (Czech Republic) K Tomalova	20	12
(Denmark) A Bond (Denmark) D Søby Hansen	21	19	20
(France) B Kersaudy (France) L Palermo	10	21	22

Second Round
(England) C Coles (England) V Williams	15	10
Q3	(Denmark) M Christiansen (Denmark) S Thygesen	21	21
6	(Chinese Taipei) Chang K-c (Chinese Taipei) Chang H-t	21	21
(France) B Kersaudy (France) L Palermo	15	16

Quarterfinals
Q3	(Denmark) M Christiansen (Denmark) S Thygesen	21	24
6	(Chinese Taipei) Chang K-c (Chinese Taipei) Chang H-t	5	22

=== Bottom half ===
==== Section 3 ====
First Round
(Canada) T Ng (Canada) R Honderich	19	14
(England) G Mairs (England) J Moore	21	21
Q1	(Malaysia) Goh S H (Malaysia) S J Lai	18	21	23
7	(Denmark) S Gravholt (Denmark) M Fruergaard	21	16	21
(England) M Nottingham (England) L Smith	21	21
Q4	(Netherlands) R Tabeling (Netherlands) C Seinen	10	14
(Croatia) Z Durkinjak (Germany) I Herttrich
3	(Republic of Ireland) S Magee (Republic of Ireland) C Magee	w	/	o

Second Round
(England) G Mairs (England) J Moore	12	8
Q1	(Malaysia) Goh S H (Malaysia) S J Lai	21	21
(England) M Nottingham (England) L Smith	21	21
3	(Republic of Ireland) S Magee (Republic of Ireland) C Magee	10	17

Quarterfinals
Q1	(Malaysia) Goh S H (Malaysia) S J Lai	13	21	21
(England) M Nottingham (England) L Smith	21	7	14

==== Section 4 ====
First Round
(Netherlands) R Jille (Netherlands) I Tabeling	21	21
(India) K. Nandagopal (India) A Ponnappa	17	17
(Switzerland) O Schaller (Switzerland) C Burkart	17	11
5	(France) R Labar (France) A Fontaine	21	21
(Canada) A Liu (Australia) L Choo	21	14
WC	(Scotland) A Hall (Scotland) E O'Donnell	23	21
(Germany) M E Seidel (Germany) L Efler	13	19
PFQ	(France) G Mittelheisser (France) E Lefel	21	21

Second Round
(Netherlands) R Jille (Netherlands) I Tabeling	21	17	16
5	(France) R Labar (France) A Fontaine	18	21	21
WC	(Scotland) A Hall (Scotland) E O'Donnell	21	11
PFQ	(France) G Mittelheisser (France) E Lefel	23	21

Quarterfinals
5	(France) R Labar (France) A Fontaine	14	20
PFQ	(France) G Mittelheisser (France) E Lefel	21	22

Preceded by 2016 Bitburger Open Grand Prix Gold	BWF Grand Prix Gold and Grand Prix; 2016 BWF Season	Succeeded by 2016 Macau Open Grand Prix Gold
