= 2026 European Women's Team Badminton Championships qualification stage =

The following results are the 2026 European Women's Team Badminton Championships qualification stage.

== Summary ==
The qualification stage was held between 3 and 7 December 2025 in 5 cities across Europe.

Group	Host city	Qualifiers	Failed to qualify
1	(Bulgaria) Sofia; Badminton hall "Europe"	Bulgaria	Switzerland; Ireland; Portugal
2	(Portugal) Caldas da Rainha; Badminton High Performance Sports Centre	Ukraine	Hungary; Belgium; Azerbaijan
3	(Lithuania) Druskininkai; LSC Sports Complex	France	Israel; Poland; Lithuania
4	(Germany) Kelkheim; Staufenhalle	Germany	Sweden; Finland; Iceland
5	(Estonia) Tallinn; Kalev Sports Hall	Estonia	Spain; Italy; Netherlands
6	(England) Milton Keynes; National Badminton Centre	Czech Republic	England; Slovakia; Slovenia

- §: Subgroup winner.

== Group 1 ==
Pos	Team	Pld	W	L	MF	MA	MD	GF	GA	GD	PF	PA	PD	Pts	Qualification
1	Bulgaria (Q)	3	3	0	13	2	+11	26	6	+20	616	466	+150	3	Advance to Final tournament
2	Switzerland	3	2	1	11	4	+7	24	9	+15	620	503	+117	2	
3	Ireland	3	1	2	6	9	−3	13	19	−6	532	575	−43	1	
4	Portugal	3	0	3	0	15	−15	1	30	−29	434	658	−224	0	

Source: BWF
(Q) Qualified to the phase indicated

=== Bulgaria vs. Portugal ===
Bulgaria
5
Europe Badminton Hall, Court 1
4 December 2025, 10:00 UTC+1

Portugal
0

			1	2	3
1	(Bulgaria) (Portugal)	Kaloyana Nalbantova; Mariana Paiva	21; 15	21; 9
2	(Bulgaria) (Portugal)	Hristomira Popovska; Madalena Fortunato	21; 13	21; 15
3	(Bulgaria) (Portugal)	Gergana Pavlova; Mafalda Avelino	21; 13	22; 20
4	(Bulgaria) (Portugal)	Tsvetina Popivanova / Stefani Stoeva; Catarina Martins / Mariana Neves	21; 9	21; 13
5	(Bulgaria) (Portugal)	Gergana Pavlova / Hristomira Popovska; Mariana Afonso / Madalena Fortunato	21; 10	21; 14

=== Ireland vs. Switzerland ===
Ireland
1
Europe Badminton Hall, Court 1
4 December 2025, 14:00 UTC+1

Switzerland
4

			1	2	3
1	(Republic of Ireland) (Switzerland)	Sophia Noble; Dounia Pelupessy	21; 10	14; 21	21; 12
2	(Republic of Ireland) (Switzerland)	Siofra Flynn; Milena Schnider	16; 21	8; 21
3	(Republic of Ireland) (Switzerland)	Michelle Shochan; Lucie Amiguet	15; 21	15; 21
4	(Republic of Ireland) (Switzerland)	Orla Flynn / Siofra Flynn; Dounia Pelupessy / Azkya Aliefa Ruhanda	18; 21	11; 21
5	(Republic of Ireland) (Switzerland)	Sophia Noble / Michelle Shochan; Lucie Amiguet / Caroline Racloz	10; 21	10; 21

=== Bulgaria vs. Ireland ===
Bulgaria
5
Europe Badminton Hall, Court 1
5 December 2025, 10:00 UTC+1

Ireland
0

			1	2	3
1	(Bulgaria) (Republic of Ireland)	Kaloyana Nalbantova; Sophia Noble	21; 18	21; 11
2	(Bulgaria) (Republic of Ireland)	Stefani Stoeva; Siofra Flynn	17; 21	21; 13	21; 14
3	(Bulgaria) (Republic of Ireland)	Gergana Pavlova; Michelle Shochan	21; 14	21; 15
4	(Bulgaria) (Republic of Ireland)	Kaloyana Nalbantova / Gabriela Stoeva; Sophia Noble / Michelle Shochan	21; 13	21; 12
5	(Bulgaria) (Republic of Ireland)	Gergana Pavlova / Tsvetina Popivanova; Orla Flynn / Siofra Flynn	22; 20	21; 12

=== Switzerland vs. Portugal ===
Switzerland
5
Europe Badminton Hall, Court 1
5 December 2025, 14:00 UTC+1

Portugal
0

			1	2	3
1	(Switzerland) (Portugal)	Milena Schnider; Mariana Paiva	21; 10	21; 14
2	(Switzerland) (Portugal)	Julie Franconville; Madalena Fortunato	21; 19	26; 28	21; 14
3	(Switzerland) (Portugal)	Azkya Aliefa Ruhanda; Mafalda Avelino	21; 9	21; 17
4	(Switzerland) (Portugal)	Lucie Amiguet / Caroline Racloz; Catarina Martins / Mariana Neves	21; 15	22; 20
5	(Switzerland) (Portugal)	Dounia Pelupessy / Azkya Aliefa Ruhanda; Mariana Afonso / Madalena Fortunato	21; 10	21; 11

=== Ireland vs. Portugal ===
Ireland
5
Europe Badminton Hall, Court 1
6 December 2025, 10:00 UTC+1

Portugal
0

			1	2	3
1	(Republic of Ireland) (Portugal)	Sophia Noble; Mariana Paiva	21; 7	21; 12
2	(Republic of Ireland) (Portugal)	Siofra Flynn; Madalena Fortunato	21; 15	21; 15
3	(Republic of Ireland) (Portugal)	Michelle Shochan; Mafalda Avelino	21; 18	21; 17
4	(Republic of Ireland) (Portugal)	Orla Flynn / Siofra Flynn; Mariana Afonso / Madalena Fortunato	21; 12	21; 17
5	(Republic of Ireland) (Portugal)	Sophia Noble / Michelle Shochan; Catarina Martins / Mariana Neves	21; 10	21; 13

=== Bulgaria vs. Switzerland ===
Bulgaria
3
Europe Badminton Hall, Court 1
6 December 2025, 14:00 UTC+1

Switzerland
2

			1	2	3
1	(Bulgaria) (Switzerland)	Kaloyana Nalbantova; Dounia Pelupessy	21; 6	20; 22	21; 12
2	(Bulgaria) (Switzerland)	Hristomira Popovska; Milena Schnider	7; 21
3	(Bulgaria) (Switzerland)	Gergana Pavlova; Lucie Amiguet	14; 21	10; 21
4	(Bulgaria) (Switzerland)	Gabriela Stoeva / Stefani Stoeva; Lucie Amiguet / Dounia Pelupessy	21; 11	21; 15
5	(Bulgaria) (Switzerland)	Kaloyana Nalbantova / Gergana Pavlova; Caroline Racloz / Azkya Aliefa Ruhanda	21; 13	21; 9

== Group 2 ==
Pos	Team	Pld	W	L	MF	MA	MD	GF	GA	GD	PF	PA	PD	Pts	Qualification
1	Ukraine (Q)	3	3	0	15	0	+15	30	3	+27	683	417	+266	3	Advance to Final tournament
2	Hungary	3	2	1	9	6	+3	19	16	+3	652	595	+57	2	
3	Belgium	3	1	2	5	10	−5	14	21	−7	603	618	−15	1	
4	Azerbaijan	3	0	3	1	14	−13	5	28	−23	366	674	−308	0	

Source: BWF
(Q) Qualified to the phase indicated

=== Ukraine vs. Belgium ===
Ukraine
5
Badminton High Performance Sports Centre – Joaquim Lopes, Court 1
5 December 2025, 10:00 UTC+1

Belgium
0

			1	2	3
1	(Ukraine) (Belgium)	Polina Buhrova; Clara Lassaux	21; 8	21; 10
2	(Ukraine) (Belgium)	Raiia Almalalha / Mariia Stoliarenko; Tammi van Wonterghem / Flore Vandenhoucke	18; 21	21; 18	21; 18
3	(Ukraine) (Belgium)	Sofiia Lavrova; Karla Henry	21; 14	21; 14
4	(Ukraine) (Belgium)	Polina Buhrova / Yevheniia Kantemyr; Fae Boonen / Lieke van Parys	21; 9	21; 9
5	(Ukraine) (Belgium)	Anastasiia Alymova; Noa Dauphinais	21; 17	16; 21	22; 20

=== Hungary vs. Azerbaijan ===
Hungary
5
Badminton High Performance Sports Centre – Joaquim Lopes, Court 2
5 December 2025, 10:00 UTC+1

Azerbaijan
0

			1	2	3
1	(Hungary) (Azerbaijan)	Vivien Sándorházi; Keisha Fatimah Azzahra	21; 18	20; 22	22; 20
2	(Hungary) (Azerbaijan)	Ágnes Kőrösi; Hajar Nuriyeva	21; 5	21; 8
3	(Hungary) (Azerbaijan)	Zsófi Szabó; Leyla Jamalzade	21; 12	21; 11
4	(Hungary) (Azerbaijan)	Petra Hart / Ágnes Kőrösi; Keisha Fatimah Azzahra / Hajar Nuriyeva	21; 15	16; 21	21; 15
5	(Hungary) (Azerbaijan)	Vivien Sándorházi / Zsófi Szabó; Yaghmur Guliyeva / Leyla Jamalzade	21; 6	21; 7

=== Ukraine vs. Hungary ===
Ukraine
5
Badminton High Performance Sports Centre – Joaquim Lopes, Court 1
6 December 2025, 10:00 UTC+1

Hungary
0

			1	2	3
1	(Ukraine) (Hungary)	Polina Buhrova; Vivien Sándorházi	21; 14	21; 8
2	(Ukraine) (Hungary)	Yevheniia Kantemyr; Ágnes Kőrösi	21; 18	16; 21	21; 18
3	(Ukraine) (Hungary)	Mariia Stoliarenko; Zsófi Szabó	21; 12	21; 10
4	(Ukraine) (Hungary)	Polina Buhrova / Yevheniia Kantemyr; Petra Hart / Ágnes Kőrösi	21; 14	21; 10
5	(Ukraine) (Hungary)	Sofiia Lavrova / Mariia Stoliarenko; Ágnes Kőrösi / Vivien Sándorházi	21; 17	23; 21

=== Azerbaijan vs. Belgium ===
Azerbaijan
1
Badminton High Performance Sports Centre – Joaquim Lopes, Court 2
6 December 2025, 10:00 UTC+1

Belgium
4

			1	2	3
1	(Azerbaijan) (Belgium)	Keisha Fatimah Azzahra; Clara Lassaux	21; 15	21; 16
2	(Azerbaijan) (Belgium)	Hajar Nuriyeva; Karla Henry	10; 21	8; 21
3	(Azerbaijan) (Belgium)	Leyla Jamalzade; Noa Dauphinais	7; 21	21; 18	11; 21
4	(Azerbaijan) (Belgium)	Yaghmur Guliyeva / Viktoria Kumanyayeva; Tammi van Wonterghem / Flore Vandenhoucke	7; 21	8; 21
5	(Azerbaijan) (Belgium)	Leyla Jamalzade / Hajar Nuriyeva; Fae Boonen / Lieke van Parys	11; 21	6; 21

=== Hungary vs. Belgium ===
Hungary
4
Badminton High Performance Sports Centre – Joaquim Lopes, Court 1
7 December 2025, 10:00 UTC+1

Belgium
1

			1	2	3
1	(Hungary) (Belgium)	Vivien Sándorházi; Clara Lassaux	21; 17	22; 20
2	(Hungary) (Belgium)	Ágnes Kőrösi; Karla Henry	19; 21	21; 11	21; 10
3	(Hungary) (Belgium)	Zsófi Szabó; Noa Dauphinais	24; 22	21; 12
4	(Hungary) (Belgium)	Ágnes Kőrösi / Vivien Sándorházi; Tammi van Wonterghem / Flore Vandenhoucke	19; 21	21; 19	21; 12
5	(Hungary) (Belgium)	Petra Hart / Zsófi Szabó; Fae Boonen / Lieke van Parys	19; 21	13; 21

=== Ukraine vs. Azerbaijan ===
Ukraine
5
Badminton High Performance Sports Centre – Joaquim Lopes, Court 2
7 December 2025, 10:00 UTC+1

Azerbaijan
0

			1	2	3
1	(Ukraine) (Azerbaijan)	Sofiia Lavrova; Hajar Nuriyeva	21; 9	21; 10
2	(Ukraine) (Azerbaijan)	Anastasiia Alymova; Leyla Jamalzade	21; 5	21; 12
3	(Ukraine) (Azerbaijan)	Mariia Stoliarenko; Yaghmur Guliyeva	21; 9	21; 1
4	(Ukraine) (Azerbaijan)	Yevheniia Kantemyr / Mariia Stoliarenko; Leyla Jamalzade / Hajar Nuriyeva	21; 5	21; 7
5	(Ukraine) (Azerbaijan)	Raiia Almalalha / Sofiia Lavrova; Yaghmur Guliyeva / Viktoria Kumanyayeva	21; 7	21; 10

== Group 3 ==
Pos	Team	Pld	W	L	MF	MA	MD	GF	GA	GD	PF	PA	PD	Pts	Qualification
1	France (Q)	3	3	0	13	2	+11	27	8	+19	685	530	+155	3	Advance to Final tournament
2	Israel	3	2	1	7	8	−1	15	18	−3	601	628	−27	2	
3	Poland	3	1	2	7	8	−1	18	20	−2	677	695	−18	1	
4	Lithuania	3	0	3	3	12	−9	11	25	−14	604	714	−110	0	

Source: BWF
(Q) Qualified to the phase indicated

=== France vs. Israel ===
France
4
LSC Sports Complex "Druskininkai", Court 1
5 December 2025, 10:00 UTC+1

Israel
1

			1	2	3
1	(France) (Israel)	Romane Cloteaux-Foucault; Heli Neiman	17; 21	19; 21
2	(France) (Israel)	Rosy Oktavia Pancasari; Dana Danilenko	21; 17	21; 11
3	(France) (Israel)	Agathe Cuevas; Zohar Amoyal	21; 9	21; 17
4	(France) (Israel)	Camille Pognante / Flavie Vallet; Alina Bergelson / Heli Neiman	21; 17	21; 16
5	(France) (Israel)	Elsa Jacob / Rosy Oktavia Pancasari; Zohar Amoyal / Dana Kugel	21; 19	21; 10

=== Lithuania vs. Poland ===
Lithuania
1
LSC Sports Complex "Druskininkai", Court 1
5 December 2025, 15:00 UTC+1

Poland
4

			1	2	3
1	(Lithuania) (Poland)	Viltė Paulauskaitė; Weronika Górniak	16; 21	17; 21
2	(Lithuania) (Poland)	Samanta Golubickaitė; Zuzanna Jankowska	16; 21	21; 11	21; 16
3	(Lithuania) (Poland)	Jorūnė Šalnaitė; Jessica Orzechowicz	21; 10	17; 21	19; 21
4	(Lithuania) (Poland)	Samanta Golubickaitė / Jogailė Kelečiūtė; Zuzanna Jankowska / Julia Piwowar	16; 21	24; 22	18; 21
5	(Lithuania) (Poland)	Viltė Paulauskaitė / Jorūnė Šalnaitė; Paulina Cybulska / Kornelia Marczak	17; 21	14; 21

=== Poland vs. Israel ===
Poland
2
LSC Sports Complex "Druskininkai", Court 1
6 December 2025, 10:00 UTC+1

Israel
3

			1	2	3
1	(Poland) (Israel)	Weronika Górniak; Heli Neiman	16; 21	14; 21
2	(Poland) (Israel)	Zuzanna Jankowska; Dana Danilenko	16; 21	21; 9	14; 21
3	(Poland) (Israel)	Jessica Orzechowicz; Alina Bergelson	21; 18	19; 21	21; 13
4	(Poland) (Israel)	Zuzanna Jankowska / Julia Piwowar; Dana Danilenko / Dana Kugel	18; 21	17; 21
5	(Poland) (Israel)	Paulina Cybulska / Kornelia Marczak; Alina Bergelson / Heli Neiman	21; 14	21; 13

=== France vs. Lithuania ===
France
5
LSC Sports Complex "Druskininkai", Court 1
6 December 2025, 15:00 UTC+1

Lithuania
0

			1	2	3
1	(France) (Lithuania)	Romane Cloteaux-Foucault; Viltė Paulauskaitė	21; 19	21; 14
2	(France) (Lithuania)	Elsa Jacob / Flavie Vallet; Taja Leonovič / Aurelija Ramaneckaitė	21; 9	21; 10
3	(France) (Lithuania)	Rosy Oktavia Pancasari; Samanta Golubickaitė	21; 11	17; 21	21; 10
4	(France) (Lithuania)	Agathe Cuevas / Kathell Desmots-Chacun; Jogailė Kelečiūtė / Giedra Velykytė	21; 8	21; 7
5	(France) (Lithuania)	Camille Pognante; Jorūnė Šalnaitė	10; 21	21; 15	21; 17

=== France vs. Poland ===
France
4
LSC Sports Complex "Druskininkai", Court 1
7 December 2025, 10:00 UTC+1

Poland
1

			1	2	3
1	(France) (Poland)	Romane Cloteaux-Foucault; Weronika Górniak	16; 21	21; 16	21; 16
2	(France) (Poland)	Kathell Desmots-Chacun / Elsa Jacob; Jessica Orzechowicz / Julia Piwowar	14; 21	21; 8	21; 16
3	(France) (Poland)	Rosy Oktavia Pancasari; Zuzanna Jankowska	21; 10	21; 8
4	(France) (Poland)	Camille Pognante / Flavie Vallet; Paulina Cybulska / Kornelia Marczak	21; 17	21; 13
5	(France) (Poland)	Agathe Cuevas; Jessica Orzechowicz	24; 22	7; 21	15; 21

=== Lithuania vs. Israel ===
Lithuania
2
LSC Sports Complex "Druskininkai", Court 1
7 December 2025, 15:00 UTC+1

Israel
3

			1	2	3
1	(Lithuania) (Israel)	Viltė Paulauskaitė; Heli Neiman	20; 22	16; 21
2	(Lithuania) (Israel)	Samanta Golubickaitė; Dana Danilenko	21; 18	24; 22
3	(Lithuania) (Israel)	Jorūnė Šalnaitė; Alina Bergelson	13; 21	18; 21
4	(Lithuania) (Israel)	Samanta Golubickaitė / Viltė Paulauskaitė; Dana Danilenko / Dana Kugel	26; 24	21; 19
5	(Lithuania) (Israel)	Jorūnė Šalnaitė / Giedra Velykytė; Alina Bergelson / Heli Neiman	15; 21	21; 19	10; 21

== Group 4 ==
Pos	Team	Pld	W	L	MF	MA	MD	GF	GA	GD	PF	PA	PD	Pts	Qualification
1	Germany (Q)	3	3	0	12	3	+9	26	8	+18	653	467	+186	3	Advance to Final tournament
2	Sweden	3	2	1	10	5	+5	22	12	+10	648	471	+177	2	
3	Finland	3	1	2	8	7	+1	16	16	0	530	537	−7	1	
4	Iceland	3	0	3	0	15	−15	2	30	−28	308	664	−356	0	

Source: BWF
(Q) Qualified to the phase indicated

=== Germany vs. Iceland ===
Germany
5
Staufenhalle, Court 1
5 December 2025, 18:00 UTC+1

Iceland
0

			1	2	3
1	(Germany) (Iceland)	Yvonne Li; Lilja Bu	21; 5	21; 4
2	(Germany) (Iceland)	Miranda Wilson; Sólrún Anna Ingvarsdóttir	21; 6	21; 6
3	(Germany) (Iceland)	Lisa Paula Bonnemann; Hrafnhildur Edda Ingvarsdóttir	21; 10	21; 10
4	(Germany) (Iceland)	Selin Hübsch / Amelie Lehmann; Arna Karen Jóhannsdóttir / Una Hrund Örvar	21; 9	21; 13
5	(Germany) (Iceland)	Leona Michalski / Thuc Phuong Nguyen; Katla Sól Arnarsdóttir / Hrafnhildur Edda Ingvarsdóttir	21; 3	21; 6

=== Sweden vs. Finland ===
Sweden
4
Staufenhalle, Court 2
5 December 2025, 14:00 UTC+1

Finland
1

			1	2	3
1	(Sweden) (Finland)	Cecilia Wang; Petra Saarnivaara	21; 18	22; 20
2	(Sweden) (Finland)	Elin Ryberg; Nella Nyqvist	14; 21	14; 21
3	(Sweden) (Finland)	Julia Tuvesson; Oona Tapola	21; 11	21; 4
4	(Sweden) (Finland)	Malena Norrman / Sofia Strömvall; Pihla Mäkelä / Helena Santalahti	21; 4	21; 5
5	(Sweden) (Finland)	Fiona Hallberg / Tilda Sjöö; Nella Nyqvist / Petra Saarnivaara	21; 14	21; 14

=== Germany vs. Finland ===
Germany
3
Staufenhalle, Court 1
6 December 2025, 18:00 UTC+1

Finland
2

			1	2	3
1	(Germany) (Finland)	Yvonne Li; Petra Saarnivaara	21; 16	21; 10
2	(Germany) (Finland)	Katharina Nilges; Nella Nyqvist	9; 21	18; 21
3	(Germany) (Finland)	Lisa Paula Bonnemann; Pihla Mäkelä	21; 14	21; 10
4	(Germany) (Finland)	Selin Hübsch / Amelie Lehmann; Nella Nyqvist / Oona Tapola	16; 21	21; 16	11; 21
5	(Germany) (Finland)	Isabel Lohau / Leona Michalski; Pihla Mäkelä / Helena Santalahti	21; 15	21; 9

=== Sweden vs. Iceland ===
Sweden
5
Staufenhalle, Court 2
6 December 2025, 14:00 UTC+1

Iceland
0

			1	2	3
1	(Sweden) (Iceland)	Cecilia Wang; Lilja Bu	21; 5	21; 10
2	(Sweden) (Iceland)	Fiona Hallberg / Elin Öhling; Katla Sól Arnarsdóttir / Una Hrund Örvar	21; 11	21; 4
3	(Sweden) (Iceland)	Selma Arvidsson; Sólrún Anna Ingvarsdóttir	20; 22	21; 6	21; 9
4	(Sweden) (Iceland)	Malena Norrman / Tilda Sjöö; Lilja Bu / Arna Karen Jóhannsdóttir	21; 9	21; 8
5	(Sweden) (Iceland)	Julia Tuvesson; Hrafnhildur Edda Ingvarsdóttir	21; 6	21; 7

=== Germany vs. Sweden ===
Germany
4
Staufenhalle, Court 1
7 December 2025, 16:00 UTC+1

Sweden
1

			1	2	3
1	(Germany) (Sweden)	Yvonne Li; Cecilia Wang	21; 9	21; 14
2	(Germany) (Sweden)	Amelie Lehmann / Leona Michalski; Malena Norrman / Sofia Strömvall	21; 12	11; 21	7; 21
3	(Germany) (Sweden)	Miranda Wilson; Elin Ryberg	21; 15	21; 15
4	(Germany) (Sweden)	Isabel Lohau / Thuc Phuong Nguyen; Elin Öhling / Tilda Sjöö	21; 23	21; 17	22; 20
5	(Germany) (Sweden)	Katharina Nilges; Julia Tuvesson	21; 12	11; 21	23; 21

=== Iceland vs. Finland ===
Iceland
0
Staufenhalle, Court 2
7 December 2025, 12:00 UTC+1

Finland
5

			1	2	3
1	(Iceland) (Finland)	Lilja Bu; Petra Saarnivaara	7; 21	9; 21
2	(Iceland) (Finland)	Sólrún Anna Ingvarsdóttir; Nella Nyqvist	6; 21	2; 21
3	(Iceland) (Finland)	Arna Karen Jóhannsdóttir; Pihla Mäkelä	13; 21	15; 21
4	(Iceland) (Finland)	Lilja Bu / Arna Karen Jóhannsdóttir; Nella Nyqvist / Oona Tapola	11; 21	16; 21
5	(Iceland) (Finland)	Hrafnhildur Edda Ingvarsdóttir / Sólrún Anna Ingvarsdóttir; Pihla Mäkelä / Helena Santalahti	21; 13	20; 22	19; 21

== Group 5 ==
Pos	Team	Pld	W	L	MF	MA	MD	GF	GA	GD	PF	PA	PD	Pts	Qualification
1	Estonia (Q)	3	3	0	10	5	+5	22	14	+8	663	612	+51	3	Advance to Final tournament
2	Spain	3	2	1	10	5	+5	22	14	+8	657	612	+45	2	
3	Italy	3	1	2	7	8	−1	17	17	0	605	616	−11	1	
4	Netherlands	3	0	3	3	12	−9	9	25	−16	590	675	−85	0	

Source: BWF
(Q) Qualified to the phase indicated

=== Italy vs. Netherlands ===
Italy
3
Kalev Sports Hall, Court 1
3 December 2025, 13:00 UTC+1

Netherlands
2

			1	2	3
1	(Italy) (Netherlands)	Yasmine Hamza; Novi Wieland	24; 22	21; 18
2	(Italy) (Netherlands)	Emma Piccinin; Inger Pothuizen	21; 17	21; 17
3	(Italy) (Netherlands)	Anna Hell; Flora Wang	21; 19	17; 21	19; 21
4	(Italy) (Netherlands)	Martina Corsini / Emma Piccinin; Kirsten de Wit / Meerte Loos	19; 21	16; 21
5	(Italy) (Netherlands)	Yasmine Hamza / Chiara Passeri; Sterre Bang / Inger Pothuizen	21; 10	21; 15

=== Spain vs Estonia ===
Spain
2
Kalev Sports Hall, Court 1
3 December 2025, 18:00 UTC+1

Estonia
3

			1	2	3
1	(Spain) (Estonia)	Clara Azurmendi; Kristin Kuuba	12; 21	21; 12	21; 11
2	(Spain) (Estonia)	Cristina Teruel; Helis Pajuste	11; 21	11; 21
3	(Spain) (Estonia)	Nikol Carulla; Catlyn Kruus	21; 17	21; 23	10; 21
4	(Spain) (Estonia)	Paula López / Lucía Rodríguez; Catlyn Kruus / Ramona Üprus	21; 9	21; 16
5	(Spain) (Estonia)	Nikol Carulla / Carmen Maria Jiménez; Kristin Kuuba / Helina Rüütel	13; 21	21; 18	16; 21

=== Spain vs. Italy ===
Spain
3
Kalev Sports Hall, Court 1
4 December 2025, 13:00 UTC+1

Italy
2

			1	2	3
1	(Spain) (Italy)	Clara Azurmendi; Yasmine Hamza	21; 13	16; 21	21; 6
2	(Spain) (Italy)	Cristina Teruel; Gianna Stiglich	16; 21	19; 21
3	(Spain) (Italy)	Laura Álvarez; Emma Piccinin	10; 21	13; 21
4	(Spain) (Italy)	Nikol Carulla / Carmen Maria Jiménez; Yasmine Hamza / Chiara Passeri	21; 8	21; 16
5	(Spain) (Italy)	Paula López / Lucía Rodríguez; Martina Corsini / Emma Piccinin	21; 14	21; 19

=== Netherlands vs. Estonia ===
Netherlands
1
Kalev Sports Hall, Court 1
4 December 2025, 18:00 UTC+1

Estonia
4

			1	2	3
1	(Netherlands) (Estonia)	Novi Wieland; Kristin Kuuba	21; 15	9; 21	16; 21
2	(Netherlands) (Estonia)	Flora Wang; Helis Pajuste	21; 17	21; 13
3	(Netherlands) (Estonia)	Mandy Duijndam; Catlyn Kruus	14; 21	14; 21
4	(Netherlands) (Estonia)	Sterre Bang / Inger Pothuizen; Kristin Kuuba / Helina Rüütel	13; 21	18; 21
5	(Netherlands) (Estonia)	Kirsten de Wit / Meerte Loos; Catlyn Kruus / Ramona Üprus	22; 24	20; 22

=== Spain vs. Netherlands ===
Spain
5
Kalev Sports Hall, Court 1
5 December 2025, 13:00 UTC+1

Netherlands
0

			1	2	3
1	(Spain) (Netherlands)	Clara Azurmendi; Novi Wieland	21; 17	21; 18
2	(Spain) (Netherlands)	Cristina Teruel; Inger Pothuizen	22; 20	21; 15
3	(Spain) (Netherlands)	Paula López / Lucía Rodríguez; Kirsten de Wit / Meerte Loos	21; 12	21; 19
4	(Spain) (Netherlands)	Laura Álvarez; Flora Wang	9; 21	21; 15	21; 15
5	(Spain) (Netherlands)	Nikol Carulla / Carmen Maria Jiménez; Sterre Bang / Inger Pothuizen	21; 12	17; 21	21; 14

=== Italy vs. Estonia ===
Italy
2
Kalev Sports Hall, Court Lenne
5 December 2025, 18:00 UTC+1

Estonia
3

			1	2	3
1	(Italy) (Estonia)	Yasmine Hamza; Kristin Kuuba	14; 21	11; 21
2	(Italy) (Estonia)	Gianna Stiglich; Helis Pajuste	21; 14	21; 12
3	(Italy) (Estonia)	Emma Piccinin; Catlyn Kruus	13; 21	21; 11	17; 21
4	(Italy) (Estonia)	Yasmine Hamza / Chiara Passeri; Kristin Kuuba / Helina Rüütel	8; 21	14; 21
5	(Italy) (Estonia)	Martina Corsini / Emma Piccinin; Catlyn Kruus / Ramona Üprus	21; 23	21; 11	21; 17

== Group 6 ==
Pos	Team	Pld	W	L	MF	MA	MD	GF	GA	GD	PF	PA	PD	Pts	Qualification
1	Czech Republic (Q)	3	3	0	13	2	+11	27	5	+22	638	454	+184	3	Advance to Final tournament
2	England	3	2	1	12	3	+9	24	8	+16	624	443	+181	2	
3	Slovakia	3	1	2	3	12	−9	6	25	−19	387	604	−217	1	
4	Slovenia	3	0	3	2	13	−11	7	26	−19	494	642	−148	0	

Source: BWF
(Q) Qualified to the phase indicated

=== England vs. Slovakia ===
England
5
National Badminton Centre, Court 1
4 December 2025, 10:00 UTC+1

Slovakia
0

			1	2	3
1	(England) (Slovakia)	Freya Redfearn; Natália Slobodová	21; 9	21; 10
2	(England) (Slovakia)	Leona Lee; Olívia Kadlecová	21; 11	21; 19
3	(England) (Slovakia)	Miu Lin Ngan; Lea Kyselicová	21; 14	21; 9
4	(England) (Slovakia)	Abbygael Harris / Estelle van Leeuwen; Johanka Ivanovičová / Olívia Kadlecová	21; 5	21; 4
5	(England) (Slovakia)	Lisa Curtin / Sian Kelly; Lea Kyselicová / Lea Výbochová	21; 7	21; 4

=== Slovenia vs. Czech Republic ===
Slovenia
0
National Badminton Centre, Court 1
4 December 2025, 14:00 UTC+1

Czech Republic
5

			1	2	3
1	(Slovenia) (Czech Republic)	Anja Blazina; Tereza Švábíková	21; 19	17; 21	18; 21
2	(Slovenia) (Czech Republic)	Tinkara Alič; Petra Maixnerová	8; 21	11; 21
3	(Slovenia) (Czech Republic)	Anja Jordan / Kim Matovič; Kateřina Osladilová / Tallulah Sharleen van Coppenolle	18; 21	15; 21
4	(Slovenia) (Czech Republic)	Tija Horvat; Lucie Krulová	9; 21	10; 21
5	(Slovenia) (Czech Republic)	Anja Blazina / Ariana Korent; Petra Maixnerová / Tereza Švábíková	19; 21	12; 21

=== Czech Republic vs. Slovakia ===
Czech Republic
5
National Badminton Centre, Court 1
5 December 2025, 12:00 UTC+1

Slovakia
0

			1	2	3
1	(Czech Republic) (Slovakia)	Petra Maixnerová; Natália Slobodová	21; 15	21; 5
2	(Czech Republic) (Slovakia)	Tallulah Sharleen van Coppenolle; Olívia Kadlecová	21; 8	21; 9
3	(Czech Republic) (Slovakia)	Lucie Krulová; Lea Výbochová	21; 16	21; 7
4	(Czech Republic) (Slovakia)	Petra Maixnerová / Klára Šilhavá; Johanka Ivanovičová / Natália Slobodová	21; 11	21; 8
5	(Czech Republic) (Slovakia)	Kateřina Osladilová / Tallulah Sharleen van Coppenolle; Lea Kyselicová / Lea Výbochová	21; 13	21; 12

=== England vs. Slovenia ===
England
5
National Badminton Centre, Court 1
5 December 2025, 17:00 UTC+1

Slovenia
0

			1	2	3
1	(England) (Slovenia)	Leona Lee; Anja Blazina	21; 9	12; 21	21; 17
2	(England) (Slovenia)	Abbygael Harris / Estelle van Leeuwen; Anja Jordan / Kim Matovič	21; 10	21; 8
3	(England) (Slovenia)	Miu Lin Ngan; Tinkara Alič	21; 14	21; 9
4	(England) (Slovenia)	Lisa Curtin / Sian Kelly; Anja Blazina / Ariana Korent	21; 11	21; 19
5	(England) (Slovenia)	Tashvi Parab; Tija Horvat	21; 19	21; 15

=== Slovenia vs. Slovakia ===
Slovenia
2
National Badminton Centre, Court 1
6 December 2025, 10:00 UTC+1

Slovakia
3

			1	2	3
1	(Slovenia) (Slovakia)	Anja Blazina; Natália Slobodová	21; 11	21; 11
2	(Slovenia) (Slovakia)	Tinkara Alič; Olívia Kadlecová	11; 21	10; 21
3	(Slovenia) (Slovakia)	Tija Horvat; Lea Výbochová	16; 21	12; 21
4	(Slovenia) (Slovakia)	Anja Jordan / Kim Matovič; Johanka Ivanovičová / Lea Kyselicová	9; 21	21; 17	21; 23
5	(Slovenia) (Slovakia)	Anja Blazina / Ariana Korent; Olívia Kadlecová / Lea Výbochová	21; 15	21; 9

=== England vs. Czech Republic ===
England
2
National Badminton Centre, Court 1
6 December 2025, 14:00 UTC+1

Czech Republic
3

			1	2	3
1	(England) (Czech Republic)	Freya Redfearn; Tereza Švábíková	17; 21	12; 21
2	(England) (Czech Republic)	Leona Lee; Petra Maixnerová	10; 21	17; 21
3	(England) (Czech Republic)	Miu Lin Ngan; Tallulah Sharleen van Coppenolle	17; 21	16; 21
4	(England) (Czech Republic)	Lisa Curtin / Sian Kelly; Petra Maixnerová / Tereza Švábíková	21; 17	19; 21	21; 14
5	(England) (Czech Republic)	Abbygael Harris / Estelle van Leeuwen; Kateřina Osladilová / Tallulah Sharleen van Coppenolle	21; 8	21; 13
