= 2023 European Mixed Team Badminton Championships =

- Venue: Complexe Sportif Régional Aire-sur-la-Lys
- Location: Aire-sur-la-Lys, France
- Dates: 14 – 18 February 2023

Medalists
gold medal	Amalie Magelund, Anders Antonsen, Frederik Søgaard, Kim Astrup, Line Christophersen, Line Kjærsfeldt, Maiken Fruergaard, Mathias Christiansen, Mathias Thyrri, Rasmus Kjær, Sara Thygesen, Viktor Axelsen, Christine Busch, Hans-Kristian Vittinghus, Jeppe Bay, Mikkel Mikkelsen, Rikke Søby Hansen	Denmark
silver medal	Alex Lanier, Anne Tran, Christo Popov, Delphine Delrue, Léonice Huet, Lucas Corvée, Margot Lambert, Qi Xuefei, Ronan Labar, Thom Gicquel, Toma Junior Popov, Camille Pognante, Emilie Vercelot, Flavie Vallet, Lucas Renoir, Malya Hoareau, Tea Margueritte	France
bronze medal	Emma Moszczynski, Fabian Roth, Isabel Lohau, Jan Colin Völker, Jones Ralfy Jansen, Kai Schäfer, Linda Efler, Mark Lamsfuß, Marvin Seidel, Stine Küspert, Yvonne Li, Ann-Kathrin Spöri, Bjarne Geiss, Franziska Volkmann, Leona Michalski, Matthias Kicklitz, Miranda Wilson, Patrick Scheiel, Samuel Hsiao	Germany
bronze medal	Abigail Holden, Ben Lane, Callum Hemming, Chloe Birch, Ethan van Leeuwen, Freya Redfearn, Gregory Mairs, Jenny Moore, Johnnie Torjussen, Harry Huang, Lauren Smith, Marcus Ellis, Sean Vendy, Cholan Kayan, Georgina Bland	England

The 2023 European Mixed Team Badminton Championships was held in Aire-sur-la-Lys, France, between 14 and 18 February 2023 and organised by Badminton Europe and French Badminton Federation. The host location was announced in December 2021 by Badminton Europe. These championships also act as the European qualification event for 2023 Sudirman Cup.

== Qualification ==
=== Direct qualifiers ===
- France (Host country)
- Denmark (Reigning champion)
- Germany (Highest ranked team)

=== Qualification stage ===
The 2023 European Mixed Team Championships Qualification was held from 15-18 December 2022. This time 26 countries aparticipated and were divided into five qualification groups played in five locations. The winner of each group qualified for the championships.

Group	Host city	Venue	Qualified team	Teams failed to qualify
1	(England) Milton Keynes	National Badminton Centre	England	Poland; Norway; Slovakia
2	(Netherlands) Haarlem	Duijnwijck Hal	Netherlands	Estonia; Israel; Italy
3	(Switzerland) Oberkirch	Campus Sursee Sportarena	Ukraine	Spain; Switzerland; Iceland
3	(Switzerland) Oberkirch	Campus Sursee Sportarena	Ukraine	Hungary; Greenland
4	(Scotland) Glasgow	National Badminton Academy	Scotland	Czech Republic; Luxembourg
4	(Scotland) Glasgow	National Badminton Academy	Scotland	Sweden; Ireland; Portugal
5	(Bulgaria) Sofia	Badminton Hall Europe	Bulgaria	Belgium; Slovenia
5	(Bulgaria) Sofia	Badminton Hall Europe	Bulgaria	Finland; Austria; Lithuania

== Group stage ==
=== Group A ===
Pos	Team	Pld	W	L	MF	MA	MD	GF	GA	GD	PF	PA	PD	Pts	Qualification
1	Denmark	3	3	0	13	2	+11	28	6	+22	688	477	+211	3	Knockout stage
2	England	3	2	1	9	6	+3	21	14	+7	636	603	+33	2	Knockout stage
3	Scotland	3	1	2	6	9	−3	13	21	−8	565	602	−37	1	
4	Ukraine	3	0	3	2	13	−11	6	27	−21	459	666	−207	0	

Source: TS

==== Denmark vs Ukraine ====
Denmark
5
Complexe Sportif Regional - Court 2
14 February 2023, 10:00 UTC+1

Ukraine
0

			1	2	3
1	(Denmark) (Ukraine)	Viktor Axelsen; Danylo Bosniuk	21; 6	21; 13
2	(Denmark) (Ukraine)	Line Christophersen; Anna Mikhalkova	21; 7	21; 14
3	(Denmark) (Ukraine)	Rasmus Kjær / Frederik Søgaard; Glib Beketov / Ivan Druzchenko	21; 4	21; 15
4	(Denmark) (Ukraine)	Maiken Fruergaard / Sara Thygesen; Mariia Stoliarenko / Yelyzaveta Zharka	21; 15	21; 19
5	(Denmark) (Ukraine)	Mathias Thyrri / Amalie Magelund; Viacheslav Yakovlev / Polina Tkach	21; 7	21; 12

==== England vs Scotland ====
England
4
Complexe Sportif Regional - Court 1
14 February 2023, 10:00 UTC+1

Scotland
1

			1	2	3
1	(England) (Scotland)	Marcus Ellis / Lauren Smith; Adam Hall / Julie MacPherson	21; 16	21; 16
2	(England) (Scotland)	Johnnie Torjussen; James Robertson	21; 10	21; 19
3	(England) (Scotland)	Abigail Holden; Kirsty Gilmour	7; 21	8; 21
4	(England) (Scotland)	Ben Lane / Sean Vendy; Alexander Dunn / Adam Hall	21; 14	20; 22	21; 14
5	(England) (Scotland)	Chloe Birch / Lauren Smith; Julie MacPherson / Ciara Torrance	21; 9	21; 15

==== Denmark vs Scotland ====
Denmark
4
Complexe Sportif Regional - Court 1
15 February 2023, 10:00 UTC+1

Scotland
1

			1	2	3
1	(Denmark) (Scotland)	Line Christophersen; Kirsty Gilmour	21; 14	18; 21	12; 21
2	(Denmark) (Scotland)	Viktor Axelsen; James Robertson	21; 8	21; 7
3	(Denmark) (Scotland)	Maiken Fruergaard / Sara Thygesen; Julie MacPherson / Ciara Torrance	21; 15	21; 16
4	(Denmark) (Scotland)	Kim Astrup / Frederik Søgaard; Alexander Dunn / Christopher Grimley	21; 17	21; 12
5	(Denmark) (Scotland)	Mathias Christiansen / Amalie Magelund; Adam Hall / Julie MacPherson	21; 11	21; 16

==== England vs Ukraine ====
England
4
Complexe Sportif Regional - Court 2
15 February 2023, 10:00 UTC+1

Ukraine
1

			1	2	3
1	(England) (Ukraine)	Abigail Holden; Polina Buhrova	15; 21	24; 22	19; 21
2	(England) (Ukraine)	Johnnie Torjussen; Oleksandar Shmundyak	21; 14	21; 14
3	(England) (Ukraine)	Chloe Birch / Lauren Smith; Mariia Stoliarenko / Yelyzaveta Zharka	21; 6	21; 9
4	(England) (Ukraine)	Ben Lane / Sean Vendy; Glib Beketov / Ivan Druzchenko	21; 16	21; 9
5	(England) (Ukraine)	Marcus Ellis / Lauren Smith; Viacheslav Yakovlev / Polina Tkach	21; 18	21; 17

==== Denmark vs England ====
Denmark
4
Complexe Sportif Regional - Court 1
16 February 2023, 10:00 UTC+1

England
1

			1	2	3
1	(Denmark) (England)	Anders Antonsen; Harry Huang	21; 9	21; 16
2	(Denmark) (England)	Line Kjærsfeldt; Freya Redfearn	21; 12	22; 24	21; 18
3	(Denmark) (England)	Rasmus Kjær / Frederik Søgaard; Callum Hemming / Ethan van Leeuwen	21; 11	21; 14
4	(Denmark) (England)	Maiken Fruergaard / Sara Thygesen; Chloe Birch / Lauren Smith	21; 16	16; 21	21; 15
5	(Denmark) (England)	Mathias Thyrri / Amalie Magelund; Gregory Mairs / Jenny Moore	18; 21	21; 9	14; 21

==== Scotland vs Ukraine ====
Scotland
4
Complexe Sportif Regional - Court 2
16 February 2023, 10:00 UTC+1

Ukraine
1

			1	2	3
1	(Scotland) (Ukraine)	Kirsty Gilmour; Maria Ulitina	21; 10	21; 9
2	(Scotland) (Ukraine)	James Robertson; Danylo Bosniuk	11; 21	15; 21
3	(Scotland) (Ukraine)	Julie MacPherson / Ciara Torrance; Mariia Stoliarenko / Yelyzaveta Zharka	21; 23	21; 15	21; 13
4	(Scotland) (Ukraine)	Christopher Grimley / Matthew Grimley; Glib Beketov / Ivan Druzchenko	21; 8	21; 11
5	(Scotland) (Ukraine)	Adam Hall / Ciara Torrance; Danylo Bosniuk / Mariia Stoliarenko	15; 21	21; 19	21; 9

=== Group B ===
Pos	Team	Pld	W	L	MF	MA	MD	GF	GA	GD	PF	PA	PD	Pts	Qualification
1	France (H)	3	3	0	13	2	+11	28	10	+18	753	619	+134	3	Knockout stage
2	Germany	3	2	1	7	8	−1	18	17	+1	626	592	+34	2	Knockout stage
3	Netherlands	3	1	2	5	10	−5	14	22	−8	614	675	−61	1	
4	Bulgaria	3	0	3	5	10	−5	10	21	−11	467	574	−107	0	

Source: TS
(H) Host

==== Germany vs Bulgaria ====
Germany
3
Complexe Sportif Regional - Court 2
14 February 2023, 16:00 UTC+1

Bulgaria
2

			1	2	3
1	(Germany) (Bulgaria)	Kai Schäfer; Dimitar Yanakiev	21; 11	21; 10
2	(Germany) (Bulgaria)	Yvonne Li; Kaloyana Nalbantova	15; 21	18; 21
3	(Germany) (Bulgaria)	Jones Ralfy Jansen / Marvin Seidel; Ivan Rusev / Iliyan Stoynov	21; 9	21; 16
4	(Germany) (Bulgaria)	Stine Küspert / Emma Moszczynski; Gabriela Stoeva / Stefani Stoeva	10; 21	10; 21
5	(Germany) (Bulgaria)	Mark Lamsfuß / Isabel Lohau; Iliyan Stoynov / Hristomira Popovska	21; 4	21; 11

==== France vs Netherlands ====
France
4
Complexe Sportif Regional - Court 1
14 February 2023, 16:00 UTC+1

Netherlands
1

			1	2	3
1	(France) (Netherlands)	Toma Junior Popov; Mark Caljouw	21; 14	21; 23	21; 14
2	(France) (Netherlands)	Léonice Huet; Nadia Choukri	21; 13	21; 11
3	(France) (Netherlands)	Christo Popov / Toma Junior Popov; Ruben Jille / Ties van der Lecq	14; 21	24; 22	21; 17
4	(France) (Netherlands)	Margot Lambert / Anne Tran; Debora Jille / Cheryl Seinen	21; 19	14; 21	21; 18
5	(France) (Netherlands)	Thom Gicquel / Delphine Delrue; Robin Tabeling / Selena Piek	21; 19	18; 21	12; 21

==== Germany vs Netherlands ====
Germany
4
Complexe Sportif Regional - Court 2
15 February 2023, 16:00 UTC+1

Netherlands
1

			1	2	3
1	(Germany) (Netherlands)	Mark Lamsfuß / Isabel Lohau; Robin Tabeling / Selena Piek	21; 7	21; 13
2	(Germany) (Netherlands)	Fabian Roth; Mark Caljouw	21; 16	17; 21	14; 21
3	(Germany) (Netherlands)	Yvonne Li; Nadia Choukri	21; 10	21; 8
4	(Germany) (Netherlands)	Mark Lamsfuß / Marvin Seidel; Ruben Jille / Ties van der Lecq	21; 11	21; 18
5	(Germany) (Netherlands)	Stine Küspert / Isabel Lohau; Debora Jille / Cheryl Seinen	17; 21	21; 10	23; 21

==== France vs Bulgaria ====
France
4
Complexe Sportif Regional - Court 1
15 February 2023, 16:00 UTC+1

Bulgaria
1

			1	2	3
1	(France) (Bulgaria)	Qi Xuefei; Hristomira Popovska	21; 19	21; 14
2	(France) (Bulgaria)	Alex Lanier; Ivan Rusev	21; 13	21; 10
3	(France) (Bulgaria)	Margot Lambert / Anne Tran; Gabriela Stoeva / Stefani Stoeva	13; 21	21; 12	10; 21
4	(France) (Bulgaria)	Christo Popov / Toma Junior Popov; Daniel Nikolov / Dimitar Yanakiev	21; 10	21; 12
5	(France) (Bulgaria)	Thom Gicquel / Delphine Delrue; Iliyan Stoynov / Gabriela Stoeva	21; 10	21; 15

==== Germany vs France ====
Germany
0
Complexe Sportif Regional - Court 1
16 February 2023, 16:00 UTC+1

France
5

			1	2	3
1	(Germany) (France)	Kai Schäfer; Christo Popov	12; 21	9; 21
2	(Germany) (France)	Yvonne Li; Qi Xuefei	22; 20	14; 21	15; 21
3	(Germany) (France)	Marvin Seidel / Jan Colin Völker; Lucas Corvée / Ronan Labar	21; 18	16; 21	22; 24
4	(Germany) (France)	Stine Küspert / Emma Moszczynski; Margot Lambert / Anne Tran	13; 21	21; 19	14; 21
5	(Germany) (France)	Jones Ralfy Jansen / Linda Efler; Thom Gicquel / Delphine Delrue	15; 21	14; 21

==== Netherlands vs Bulgaria ====
Netherlands
3
Complexe Sportif Regional - Court 2
16 February 2023, 16:00 UTC+1

Bulgaria
2

			1	2	3
1	(Netherlands) (Bulgaria)	Joran Kweekel; Dimitar Yanakiev	21; 13	21; 17
2	(Netherlands) (Bulgaria)	Nadia Choukri; Kaloyana Nalbantova	19; 21	10; 21
3	(Netherlands) (Bulgaria)	Robin Tabeling / Ties van der Lecq; Ivan Rusev / Iliyan Stoynov	21; 14	21; 13
4	(Netherlands) (Bulgaria)	Debora Jille / Cheryl Seinen; Gabriela Stoeva / Stefani Stoeva	12; 21	16; 21
5	(Netherlands) (Bulgaria)	Robin Tabeling / Selena Piek; Iliyan Stoynov / Hristomira Popovska	21; 14	21; 10

== Knockout stage ==
Semi-finals
Denmark	3
England	0
Germany	1
France	3

Final
Denmark	3
France	2

=== Semi-finals ===
Denmark
3
Complexe Sportif Regional - Court 1
17 February 2023, 13:00 UTC+1

England
0

			1	2	3
1	(Denmark) (England)	Line Christophersen; Freya Redfearn	21; 5	21; 15
2	(Denmark) (England)	Viktor Axelsen; Johnnie Torjussen	21; 12	21; 8
3	(Denmark) (England)	Maiken Fruergaard / Sara Thygesen; Chloe Birch / Lauren Smith	21; 18	21; 15
4	(Denmark) (England)	Kim Astrup / Frederik Søgaard; Ben Lane / Sean Vendy				not played
5	(Denmark) (England)	Mathias Christiansen / Amalie Magelund; Marcus Ellis / Lauren Smith				not played

Germany
1
Complexe Sportif Regional - Court 1
17 February 2023, 18:00 UTC+1

France
3

			1	2	3
1	(Germany) (France)	Yvonne Li; Qi Xuefei	16; 21	21; 8	11; 21
2	(Germany) (France)	Fabian Roth; Toma Junior Popov	13; 21	13; 21
3	(Germany) (France)	Linda Efler / Isabel Lohau; Margot Lambert / Anne Tran	21; 17	21; 10
4	(Germany) (France)	Marvin Seidel / Jan Colin Völker; Christo Popov / Toma Junior Popov	21; 23	15; 21
5	(Germany) (France)	Jones Ralfy Jansen / Isabel Lohau; Thom Gicquel / Delphine Delrue				not played

=== Final ===
Denmark
3
Complexe Sportif Regional - Court 1
17 February 2023, 13:00 UTC+1

France
2

			1	2	3
1	(Denmark) (France)	Mathias Christiansen / Amalie Magelund; Thom Gicquel / Delphine Delrue	17; 21	22; 24
2	(Denmark) (France)	Viktor Axelsen; Christo Popov	15; 21	22; 20	21; 14
3	(Denmark) (France)	Line Christophersen; Qi Xuefei	21; 12	21; 11
4	(Denmark) (France)	Kim Astrup / Frederik Søgaard; Thom Gicquel / Toma Junior Popov	19; 21	19; 21
5	(Denmark) (France)	Maiken Fruergaard / Sara Thygesen; Delphine Delrue / Margot Lambert	17; 21	21; 15	21; 14

== Final ranking ==
Pos	Team	Pld	W	L	Pts	MD	GD	PD	Final result
1st place, gold medalist(s)	Denmark	5	5	0	5	+15	+28	+285	Champions
2nd place, silver medalist(s)	France	5	4	1	4	+12	+21	+124	Runners-up
3rd place, bronze medalist(s)	Germany	4	2	2	2	−3	−2	+23	Eliminated in semi-finals
3rd place, bronze medalist(s)	England	4	2	2	2	0	+1	−20	Eliminated in semi-finals
5	Scotland	3	1	2	1	−3	−8	−37	Eliminated in group stage
6	Netherlands	3	1	2	1	−5	−8	−61	Eliminated in group stage
7	Bulgaria	3	0	3	0	−5	−11	−107	Eliminated in group stage
8	Ukraine	3	0	3	0	−11	−21	−207	Eliminated in group stage
