= England national badminton team =

English national badminton team

England
- Association: Badminton England
- Confederation: Badminton Europe
- President: Mike Robinson

BWF ranking
- Current ranking: 14 ▼1 (6 October 2026)
- Highest ranking: 10 (2 July 2019)

Sudirman Cup
- Appearances: 16 (first in 1989)
- Best result: Semi-finals (2007)

Thomas Cup
- Appearances: 17 (first in 1982)
- Best result: Semi-finals (1982, 1984)

Uber Cup
- Appearances: 14 (first in 1963)
- Best result: Runners-up (1963, 1984)

European Mixed Team Championships
- Appearances: 28 (first in 1972)
- Best result: Champions (1972, 1974, 1978, 1982, 1984)

European Men's Team Championships
- Appearances: 8 (first in 2006)
- Best result: Runners-up (2008, 2014, 2018)

European Women's Team Championships
- Appearances: 8 (first in 2006)
- Best result: Runners-up (2006)

The England national badminton team represents England in international badminton team competitions and is controlled by Badminton England, the governing body for badminton in England. The English team is ranked 13 on the world ranking and has had many appearances in international team events.

England were runners-up at the 1963 and the 1984 Uber Cup. They've also been semifinalists 4 times at the Uber Cup. The men's team had two semifinal finishes at the 1982 and 1984 edition of the Thomas Cup. England only finished in the final four once in the Sudirman Cup which was in 2007.

Next to Denmark, England is one of the dominant badminton nations in Europe, having won the European Mixed Team Badminton Championships five times and having many podium finishes at the European Men's and Women's Team Badminton Championships.

== Competitive record ==
=== Thomas Cup ===
Year	Round	Pos
1949	Did not qualify	
1952	Did not qualify	
1955	Did not qualify	
1958	Did not qualify	
1961	Did not qualify	
1964	Did not qualify	
1967	Did not qualify	
1970	Did not qualify	
1973	Did not qualify	
1976	Did not qualify	
1979	Did not qualify	
1982	Semi-finals	4th
1984	Third place	3rd
1986	Group stage	6th
1988	Group stage	5th
1990	Group stage	7th
1992	Group stage	5th
1994	Did not qualify	
1996	Group stage	7th
1998	Did not qualify	
2000	Group stage	6th
2002	Did not qualify	
2004	Round of 16	9th
2006	Quarter-finals	5/8
2008	Quarter-finals	5/8
2010	Did not qualify	
2012	Group stage	9th
2014	Group stage	15th
2016	Group stage	10th
2018	Did not qualify	
2020	Withdrew	
2022	Group stage	11th
2024	Group stage	15th
2026	Group stage	12th
2028	To be determined	
2030	To be determined	

=== Uber Cup ===
Year	Round	Pos
1957	Did not qualify	
1960	Did not qualify	
1963	Runners-up	2nd
1966	Second round inter-zone	3rd
1969	Second round inter-zone	3rd
1972	Did not qualify	
1975	Second round inter-zone	3rd
1978	Did not qualify	
1981	Second round inter-zone	3rd
1984	Runners-up	2nd
1986	Group stage	5th
1988	Group stage	5th
1990	Group stage	5th
1992	Group stage	7th
1994	Did not qualify	
1996	Group stage	6th
1998	Group stage	6th
2000	Did not qualify	
2002	Did not qualify	
2004	Did not qualify	
2006	Round of 16	10th
2008	Did not qualify	
2010	Did not qualify	
2012	Did not qualify	
2014	Quarter-finals	5/8
2016	Did not qualify	
2018	Did not qualify	
2020	Did not qualify	
2022	Did not qualify	
2024	Did not qualify	
2026	Did not qualify	
2028	To be determined	
2030	To be determined	

=== Sudirman Cup ===
Year	Round	Pos
1989	Group stage	6th
1991	Group stage	7th
1993	Group stage	5th
1995	Group stage	5th
1997	Group stage	6th
1999	Group stage	7th
2001	Group stage	5th
2003	Group stage	5th
2005	Group stage	5th
2007	Semi-finals	4th
2009	Group stage	6th
2011	Group stage	9th
2013	Did not enter	
2015	Group stage	9th
2017	Did not enter	
2019	Group stage	9th
2021	Group stage	9th
2023	Group stage	14th
2025	Group stage	15th
2027	To be determined	
2029	To be determined	

=== European Team Championships ===
==== Men's team ====
Year	Round	Pos
2006	Third place	3rd
2008	Runners-up	2nd
2010	Group stage	7/14
2012	Third place	3rd
2014	Runners-up	2nd
2016	Semi-finals	3rd
2018	Runners-up	2nd
2020	Quarter-finals	5/8
2024	Semi-finals	4th
2026	Semi-finals	3rd
2028	To be determined	
2030	To be determined	

==== Women's team ====
Year	Round	Pos
2006	Runners-up	2nd
2008	Quarter-finals	5/8
2010	Group stage	7/12
2012	Group stage	9/16
2014	Quarter-finals	5/8
2016	Group stage	9/10
2018	Quarter-finals	5/8
2020	Group stage	9/14
2024	Did not qualify	
2026	Did not qualify	
2028	TBD	
2030	TBD	

==== Mixed team ====
Year	Round	Pos
1972	Champions	1st
1974	Champions	1st
1976	Runners-up	2nd
1978	Champions	1st
1980	Runners-up	2nd
1982	Champions	1st
1984	Champions	1st
1986	Runners-up	2nd
1988	Third place	3rd
1990	Third place	3rd
1992	Third place	3rd
1994	Third place	3rd
1996	Third place	3rd
1998	Runners-up	2nd
2000	Runners-up	2nd
2002	Runners-up	2nd
2004	Fourth place	4th
2006	Third place	3rd
2008	Runners-up	2nd
2009	Runners-up	2nd
2011	Semi-finals	4th
2013	Semi-finals	3rd
2015	Runners-up	2nd
2017	Semi-finals	4th
2019	Group stage	5/6
2021	Group stage	7/8
2023	Semi-finals	3rd
2025	Semi-finals	4th
2027	To be determined	
2029	To be determined	

**Red border color indicates tournament was held on home soil.

== Junior competitive record ==
=== Suhandinata Cup ===
Year	Round	Pos
2000	Group stage	8th
2002	Group stage	8th
2004	Group stage	6th
2006	Group stage	10th
2007	Group stage	9th
2008	Group stage	13th
2009	Group stage	14th
2010	Group stage	10th
2011	Group stage	14th
2012	Group stage	15th
2013	Did not enter	
2014	Group stage	17th
2015	Group stage	14th
2016	Group stage	12th
2017	Group stage	9th
2018	Group stage	14th
2019	Group stage	11th
2020	Cancelled because of COVID-19 pandemic	
2021	Cancelled because of COVID-19 pandemic	
2022	Group stage	7th
2023	Group stage	14th
2024	Group stage	15th
2025	Group stage	21st of 36
2026	Group stage	14th of 47

=== European Junior Team Championships ===
==== Mixed team ====
Year	Round	Pos
1975	Runners-up	2nd
1977	Champions	1st
1979	Runners-up	2nd
1981	Runners-up	2nd
1983	Champions	1st
1985	Runners-up	2nd
1987	Runners-up	2nd
1989	Runners-up	2nd
1991	Fourth place	4th
1993	Group stage	5th
1995	Third place	3rd
1997	Fourth place	4th
1999	Group stage	5th
2001	Fourth place	4th
2003	Group stage	6th
2005	Group stage	6th
2007	Champions	1st
2009	Semi-finals	3rd
2011	Quarter-finals	5/7
2013	Quarter-finals	5/8
2015	Runners-up	2nd
2017	Semi-finals	4th
2018	Quarter-finals	5/8
2020	Did not enter	
2022	Quarter-finals	5/8
2024	Group stage	9/16
2026	Quarter-finals	5/8

**Red border color indicates tournament was held on home soil.

== Current Male and Female players ==
As of 30 January 2025

Male players

- Ben Lane
- Sean Vendy
- Harry Huang
- Nadeem Dalvi
- Alex Green
- Callum Hemming
- Ethan van Leeuwen
- Rory Easton
- Zach Russ
- Brandon Yap
- Sam Jones

Female players

- Chloe Birch
- Freya Patel-Redfearn
- Leona Lee
- Lisa Curtin
- Abbygael Harris
- Annie Lado
- Estelle Van Leeuwen
- Lizzie Tolman
