= 2025 European Mixed Team Badminton Championships =

International badminton championships

- Venue: Baku Sports Palace
- Location: Baku, Azerbaijan
- Dates: 12 – 16 February 2025

The 2025 European Mixed Team Badminton Championships was held in Baku, Azerbaijan, at 12 to 16 February 2025 and organised by Badminton Europe and Azerbaijan Badminton Federation. The host location was announced in April 2024 by Badminton Europe. These championships also act as the European qualification event for 2025 Sudirman Cup.

== Qualification ==
=== Direct qualifiers ===
- Azerbaijan (Host country)
- Denmark (Reigning champion)

=== Qualification stage ===
The 2025 European Mixed Team Championships Qualification was held from 5 to 8 December 2024. This time 26 countries are participating and dividing into six qualification groups which was played in five locations. The winner of each group qualifies for the championships.

Group	Host city	Qualified team	Teams failed to qualify
1	(Germany) Wipperfürth; VOSS Arena	France	Slovakia; Slovenia; Sweden
2	(Spain) Ibiza; Poliesportiu Sa Blanca Dona	Spain	Belgium; Estonia; Portugal
3	(Germany) Wipperfürth; VOSS Arena	Germany	Ireland; Italy; Norway
4	(Netherlands) Haarlem; Duijnwijck Hall	Netherlands	Iceland; Turkey; Ukraine
5	(England) Milton Keynes; National Badminton Centre	England	Austria; Poland; Israel
6	(Bulgaria) Sofia; Badminton Hall Europe	Czech Republic	Bulgaria^{§} Croatia; Hungary
6	(Bulgaria) Sofia; Badminton Hall Europe	Czech Republic	Finland; Switzerland

== Medalists ==
Event	Gold	Silver	Bronze
Mixed team	Denmark; Anders Antonsen; Kim Astrup; Viktor Axelsen; Rasmus Gemke; Rasmus Kjær; Daniel Lundgaard; Anders Skaarup Rasmussen; Frederik Søgaard; Jesper Toft; Mads Vestergaard Natasja Anthonisen; Mia Blichfeldt; Alexandra Bøje; Christine Busch; Line Christophersen; Maiken Fruergaard; Julie Dawall Jakobsen; Line Kjærsfeldt; Amalie Magelund	France; Éloi Adam; Thom Gicquel; Alex Lanier; Julien Maio; Christo Popov; Toma Junior Popov; Léo Rossi Delphine Delrue; Léonice Huet; Elsa Jacob; Margot Lambert; Léa Palermo; Camille Pognante; Qi Xuefei; Anna Tatranova	Germany; Malik Bourakkadi; Bjarne Geiss; Daniel Hess; Jones Ralfy Jansen; Matthias Kicklitz; Kenneth Neumann; Kian-yu Oei; Sanjeevi Padmanabhan Vasudevan; Fabian Roth; Marvin Seidel; Jan Colin Völker Yvonne Li; Leona Michalski; Thuc Phuong Nguyen; Gloria Poluektov; Franziska Volkmann; Miranda Wilson
Mixed team	Denmark; Anders Antonsen; Kim Astrup; Viktor Axelsen; Rasmus Gemke; Rasmus Kjær; Daniel Lundgaard; Anders Skaarup Rasmussen; Frederik Søgaard; Jesper Toft; Mads Vestergaard Natasja Anthonisen; Mia Blichfeldt; Alexandra Bøje; Christine Busch; Line Christophersen; Maiken Fruergaard; Julie Dawall Jakobsen; Line Kjærsfeldt; Amalie Magelund	France; Éloi Adam; Thom Gicquel; Alex Lanier; Julien Maio; Christo Popov; Toma Junior Popov; Léo Rossi Delphine Delrue; Léonice Huet; Elsa Jacob; Margot Lambert; Léa Palermo; Camille Pognante; Qi Xuefei; Anna Tatranova	England; Nadeem Dalvi; Rory Easton; Alex Green; Callum Hemming; Harry Huang; Ben Lane; Ethan van Leeuwen; Sean Vendy Abbygael Harris; Leona Lee; Kirby Ngan; Freya Redfearn; Lizzie Tolman; Estelle van Leeuwen

== Group stage ==
=== Group A ===
Pos	Team	Pld	W	L	MF	MA	MD	GF	GA	GD	PF	PA	PD	Pts	Qualification
1	Denmark	3	3	0	14	1	+13	29	2	+27	645	403	+242	3	Knockout stage
2	England	3	2	1	6	9	−3	14	19	−5	572	599	−27	2	Knockout stage
3	Spain	3	1	2	5	10	−5	12	22	−10	584	628	−44	1	
4	Azerbaijan (H)	3	0	3	5	10	−5	10	22	−12	433	604	−171	0	

Source: BWF
(H) Host

==== Denmark vs Spain ====
Denmark
5
Baku Sports Palace - Court 1
12 February 2025, 10:00 UTC+4
Report

Spain
0

			1	2	3
1	(Denmark) (Spain)	Anders Antonsen; Álvaro Leal	21; 16	21; 15
2	(Denmark) (Spain)	Line Kjærsfeldt; Clara Azurmendi	21; 18	21; 18
3	(Denmark) (Spain)	Rasmus Kjær / Frederik Søgaard; Daniel Franco / Rodrigo Sanjurjo	21; 10	21; 11
4	(Denmark) (Spain)	Natasja Anthonisen / Alexandra Bøje; Nikol Carulla / Carmen Maria Jiménez	21; 10	21; 12
5	(Denmark) (Spain)	Jesper Toft / Amalie Magelund; Rubén García / Lucía Rodríguez	21; 19	21; 14

==== England vs Azerbaijan ====
England
3
Baku Sports Palace - Court 2
12 February 2025, 10:00 UTC+4
Report

Azerbaijan
2

			1	2	3
1	(England) (Azerbaijan)	Rory Easton / Lizzie Tolman; Dicky Dwi Pangestu / Keisha Fatimah Azzahra	21; 12	21; 9
2	(England) (Azerbaijan)	Harry Huang; Ade Resky Dwicahyo	25; 27	13; 21
3	(England) (Azerbaijan)	Freya Redfearn; Keisha Fatimah Azzahra	11; 21	7; 21
4	(England) (Azerbaijan)	Callum Hemming / Ethan van Leeuwen; Agil Gabilov / Dicky Dwi Pangestu	21; 12	21; 7
5	(England) (Azerbaijan)	Abbygael Harris / Estelle van Leeuwen; Leyla Jamalzade / Hajar Nuriyeva	21; 6	21; 9

==== Denmark vs England ====
Denmark
5
Baku Sports Palace - Court 1
13 February 2025, 10:00 UTC+4
Report

England
0

			1	2	3
1	(Denmark) (England)	Rasmus Gemke; Nadeem Dalvi	21; 13	21; 16
2	(Denmark) (England)	Line Christophersen; Leona Lee	21; 7	21; 10
3	(Denmark) (England)	Rasmus Kjær / Frederik Søgaard; Rory Easton / Alex Green	21; 18	21; 15
4	(Denmark) (England)	Natasja Anthonisen / Amalie Magelund; Abbygael Harris / Lizzie Tolman	21; 13	21; 11
5	(Denmark) (England)	Mads Vestergaard / Alexandra Bøje; Callum Hemming / Estelle van Leeuwen	21; 17	25; 23

==== Azerbaijan vs Spain ====
Azerbaijan
2
Baku Sports Palace - Court 2
13 February 2025, 10:00 UTC+4
Report

Spain
3

			1	2	3
1	(Azerbaijan) (Spain)	Dicky Dwi Pangestu / Keisha Fatimah Azzahra; Rubén García / Lucía Rodríguez	18; 21	18; 21
2	(Azerbaijan) (Spain)	Ade Resky Dwicahyo; Pablo Abián	21; 18	8; 21	21; 13
3	(Azerbaijan) (Spain)	Keisha Fatimah Azzahra; Clara Azurmendi	17; 21	14; 21
4	(Azerbaijan) (Spain)	Ade Resky Dwicahyo / Dicky Dwi Pangestu; Rubén García / Rodrigo Sanjurjo	21; 9	21; 14
5	(Azerbaijan) (Spain)	Leyla Jamalzade / Hajar Nuriyeva; Nikol Carulla / Lucía Rodríguez	8; 21	4; 21

==== England vs Spain ====
England
3
Baku Sports Palace - Court 1
14 February 2025, 10:00 UTC+4
Report

Spain
2

			1	2	3
1	(England) (Spain)	Callum Hemming / Estelle van Leeuwen; Rubén García / Lucía Rodríguez	18; 21	21; 16	21; 19
2	(England) (Spain)	Harry Huang; Pablo Abián	21; 18	18; 21	11; 21
3	(England) (Spain)	Leona Lee; Clara Azurmendi	21; 18	21; 19
4	(England) (Spain)	Callum Hemming / Ethan van Leeuwen; Daniel Franco / Rodrigo Sanjurjo	21; 13	21; 11
5	(England) (Spain)	Abbygael Harris / Estelle van Leeuwen; Clara Azurmendi / Lucía Rodríguez	23; 21	18; 21	12; 21

==== Denmark vs Azerbaijan ====
Denmark
4
Baku Sports Palace - Court 2
14 February 2025, 10:00 UTC+4
Report

Azerbaijan
1

			1	2	3
1	(Denmark) (Azerbaijan)	Line Kjærsfeldt; Keisha Fatimah Azzahra	21; 17	11; 21	21; 23
2	(Denmark) (Azerbaijan)	Anders Antonsen; Ulvi Huseynov	21; 8	21; 4
3	(Denmark) (Azerbaijan)	Natasja Anthonisen / Maiken Fruergaard; Leyla Jamalzade / Hajar Nuriyeva	21; 6	21; 3
4	(Denmark) (Azerbaijan)	Kim Astrup / Mads Vestergaard; Agil Gabilov / Dicky Dwi Pangestu	21; 12	21; 8
5	(Denmark) (Azerbaijan)	Jesper Toft / Amalie Magelund; Jahid Alhasanov / Hajar Nuriyeva	21; 7	21; 8

=== Group B ===
Pos	Team	Pld	W	L	MF	MA	MD	GF	GA	GD	PF	PA	PD	Pts	Qualification
1	France	3	3	0	14	1	+13	28	5	+23	689	494	+195	3	Knockout stage
2	Germany	3	2	1	10	5	+5	22	13	+9	678	643	+35	2	Knockout stage
3	Czech Republic	3	1	2	4	11	−7	11	22	−11	544	626	−82	1	
4	Netherlands	3	0	3	2	13	−11	5	26	−21	473	621	−148	0	

Source: BWF

==== France vs Germany ====
France
5
Baku Sports Palace - Court 1
12 February 2025, 15:00 UTC+4
Report

Germany
0

			1	2	3
1	(France) (Germany)	Alex Lanier; Fabian Roth	21; 15	21; 17
2	(France) (Germany)	Léonice Huet; Gloria Poluektov	21; 14	22; 20
3	(France) (Germany)	Christo Popov / Toma Junior Popov; Bjarne Geiss / Marvin Seidel	21; 13	19; 21	21; 12
4	(France) (Germany)	Elsa Jacob / Margot Lambert; Leona Michalski / Thuc Phuong Nguyen	20; 22	26; 24	21; 10
5	(France) (Germany)	Thom Gicquel / Delphine Delrue; Jan Colin Völker / Franziska Volkmann	21; 15	21; 19

==== Netherlands vs Czech Republic ====
Netherlands
2
Baku Sports Palace - Court 2
12 February 2025, 15:00 UTC+4
Report

Czech Republic
3

			1	2	3
1	(Netherlands) (Czech Republic)	Ties van der Lecq / Debora Jille; Tomáš Švejda / Soňa Hořínková	21; 12	21; 11
2	(Netherlands) (Czech Republic)	Noah Haase; Jan Louda	12; 21	13; 21
3	(Netherlands) (Czech Republic)	Novi Wieland; Petra Maixnerová	15; 21	7; 21
4	(Netherlands) (Czech Republic)	Ties van der Lecq / Brian Wassink; Jiří Král / Adam Mendrek	12; 21	16; 21
5	(Netherlands) (Czech Republic)	Kirsten de Wit / Debora Jille; Tereza Švábíková / Kateřina Zuzáková	21; 10	21; 19

==== France vs Netherlands ====
France
5
Baku Sports Palace - Court 1
13 February 2025, 15:00 UTC+4
Report

Netherlands
0

			1	2	3
1	(France) (Netherlands)	Thom Gicquel / Delphine Delrue; Andy Buijk / Meerte Loos	21; 10	21; 7
2	(France) (Netherlands)	Christo Popov; Noah Hasse	21; 9	21; 12
3	(France) (Netherlands)	Léonice Huet; Flora Wang	21; 12	21; 13
4	(France) (Netherlands)	Éloi Adam / Léo Rossi; Ties van der Lecq / Brian Wassink	21; 15	21; 15
5	(France) (Netherlands)	Margot Lambert / Camille Pognante; Kirsten de Wit / Meerte Loos	21; 13	21; 16

==== Czech Republic vs Germany ====
Czech Republic
0
Baku Sports Palace - Court 2
13 February 2025, 15:00 UTC+4
Report

Germany
5

			1	2	3
1	(Czech Republic) (Germany)	Jan Louda; Matthias Kicklitz	21; 12	13; 21	16; 21
2	(Czech Republic) (Germany)	Tereza Švábíková; Miranda Wilson	21; 19	19; 21	16; 21
3	(Czech Republic) (Germany)	Jiří Král / Adam Mendrek; Daniel Hess / Marvin Seidel	19; 21	6; 21
4	(Czech Republic) (Germany)	Soňa Hořínková / Kateřina Zuzáková; Leona Michalski / Thuc Phuong Nguyen	12; 21	20; 22
5	(Czech Republic) (Germany)	Jiří Král / Tereza Švábíková; Jan Colin Völker / Franziska Volkmann	13; 21	20; 22

==== Netherlands vs Germany ====
Netherlands
0
Baku Sports Palace - Court 1
14 February 2025, 15:00 UTC+4
Report

Germany
5

			1	2	3
1	(Netherlands) (Germany)	Flora Wang; Miranda Wilson	16; 21	16; 21
2	(Netherlands) (Germany)	Noah Hasse; Fabian Roth	24; 22	20; 22	16; 21
3	(Netherlands) (Germany)	Kirsten de Wit / Meerte Loos; Leona Michalski / Franziska Volkmann	18; 21	17; 21
4	(Netherlands) (Germany)	Ties van der Lecq / Brian Wassink; Daniel Hess / Marvin Seidel	17; 21	15; 21
5	(Netherlands) (Germany)	Andy Buijk / Meerte Loos; Jan Colin Völker / Franziska Volkmann	17; 21	16; 21

==== France vs Czech Republic ====
France
4
Baku Sports Palace - Court 2
14 February 2025, 15:00 UTC+4
Report

Czech Republic
1

			1	2	3
1	(France) (Czech Republic)	Toma Junior Popov; Dominik Kopřiva	21; 12	21; 16
2	(France) (Czech Republic)	Anna Tatranova; Petra Maixnerová	24; 26	13; 21
3	(France) (Czech Republic)	Christo Popov / Toma Junior Popov; Jiří Král / Adam Mendrek	21; 14	21; 12
4	(France) (Czech Republic)	Margot Lambert / Camille Pognante; Tereza Švábíková / Kateřina Zuzáková	19; 21	21; 10	21; 18
5	(France) (Czech Republic)	Thom Gicquel / Delphine Delrue; Tomáš Švejda / Soňa Hořínková	21; 7	21; 13

== Knockout stage ==
Semi-finals
Denmark	3
Germany	0
England	0
France	3

Final
Denmark	3
France	0

=== Semi-finals ===
==== Denmark vs Germany ====
Denmark
3
Baku Sports Palace - Court 1
15 February 2025, 10:00 UTC+4
Report

Germany
0

			1	2	3
1	(Denmark) (Germany)	Line Christophersen; Miranda Wilson	21; 11	21; 9
2	(Denmark) (Germany)	Rasmus Gemke; Matthias Kicklitz	21; 18	21; 11
3	(Denmark) (Germany)	Natasja Anthonisen / Maiken Fruergaard; Leona Michalski / Franziska Volkmann	21; 11	21; 14
4	(Denmark) (Germany)	Rasmus Kjær / Frederik Søgaard; Daniel Hess / Marvin Seidel				not played
5	(Denmark) (Germany)	Jesper Toft / Amalie Magelund; Jan Colin Völker / Franziska Volkmann				not played

==== England vs France ====
England
0
Baku Sports Palace - Court 1
15 February 2025, 15:00 UTC+4
Report

France
3

			1	2	3
1	(England) (France)	Callum Hemming / Estelle van Leeuwen; Thom Gicquel / Delphine Delrue	16; 21	19; 21
2	(England) (France)	Harry Huang; Alex Lanier	15; 21	11; 21
3	(England) (France)	Leona Lee; Léonice Huet	16; 21	10; 21
4	(England) (France)	Callum Hemming / Ethan van Leeuwen; Thom Gicquel / Toma Junior Popov				not played
5	(England) (France)	Lizzie Tolman / Estelle van Leeuwen; Delphine Delrue / Margot Lambert				not played

=== Final ===
==== Denmark vs France ====
Denmark
3
Baku Sports Palace - Court 1
16 February 2025, 12:00 UTC+4
Report

France
0

			1	2	3
1	(Denmark) (France)	Jesper Toft / Amalie Magelund; Thom Gicquel / Delphine Delrue	21; 11	18; 21	21; 15
2	(Denmark) (France)	Anders Antonsen; Alex Lanier	21; 19	21; 18
3	(Denmark) (France)	Line Christophersen; Léonice Huet	21; 16	21; 14
4	(Denmark) (France)	Rasmus Kjær / Frederik Søgaard; Thom Gicquel / Toma Junior Popov				not played
5	(Denmark) (France)	Alexandra Bøje / Maiken Fruergaard; Delphine Delrue / Margot Lambert				not played

== Final ranking ==
Pos	Team	Pld	W	L	Pts	MD	GD	PD	Final result
1st place, gold medalist(s)	Denmark	5	5	0	5	+19	+38	+324	Champions
2nd place, silver medalist(s)	France	5	4	1	4	+13	+24	+204	Runners-up
3rd place, bronze medalist(s)	Germany	4	2	2	2	+2	+3	–17	Eliminated in semi-finals
3rd place, bronze medalist(s)	England	4	2	2	2	–6	–11	–66	Eliminated in semi-finals
5	Spain	3	1	2	1	–5	–10	–44	Eliminated in group stage
6	Czech Republic	3	1	2	1	–7	–11	–82	Eliminated in group stage
7	Netherlands	3	0	3	0	–11	–21	–148	Eliminated in group stage
8	Azerbaijan	3	0	3	0	–5	–12	–171	Eliminated in group stage
