= English National Badminton Championships =

English badminton competition

- Frequency: annual
- Country: England
- Inaugurated: 1964
- Next event: 2023
- Organiser: Badminton England
- Website: www.badmintonengland.co.uk

The English National Badminton Championships is a tournament organised by the Badminton England to crown the best badminton players in England.

The tournament started in 1964 and is held annually. The first winners were Bill Havers and Ursula Smith in 1964. Darren Hall has won the most singles titles with 10, whilst Gillian Gilks and Julia Mann both have eight women's singles titles.

== Past winners ==
Year	Location	Men's singles	Women's singles	Men's doubles	Women's doubles	Mixed doubles	Sources
1964	Wimbledon	Bill Havers	Ursula Smith	Trevor Coates; Tony Jordan	Ursula Smith; Jenny Pritchard	Colin Beacom; Jenny Pritchard	
1965	Birkenhead	Roger Mills	Angela Bairstow	John Havers; Bill Havers	Ursula Smith; Jenny Pritchard	Roger Mills; Margaret Barrand	
1966	Wimbledon	Roger Mills	Ursula Smith	Tony Jordan; Colin Beacom	Angela Bairstow; Margaret Barrand	Tony Jordan; Julie Charles	
1967	Cambridge	Roger Mills	Ursula Smith	Roger Mills; David Horton	Sue Pound; Margaret Boxall	David Horton; Jenny Horton	
1968	Derby	Ray Sharp	Angela Bairstow	Tony Jordan; Colin Beacom	Sue Pound; Margaret Boxall	Roger Mills; Gillian Perrin	
1969	Derby	Ray Sharp	Gillian Perrin	David Eddy; Roger Powell	Susan Whetnall; Margaret Boxall	Roger Mills; Gillian Perrin	
1970	Poole	Paul Whetnall	Gillian Perrin	Tony Jordan; Roger Mills	Susan Whetnall; Margaret Boxall	Paul Whetnall; Margaret Boxall	
1971	Nottingham	Derek Talbot	Gillian Perrin	Elliot Stuart; Derek Talbot	Margaret Beck; Julie Rickard	Roger Mills; Gillian Gilks	
1972	Falmer	Derek Talbot	Margaret Beck	Elliot Stuart; Derek Talbot	Judy Hashman; Gillian Gilks	Derek Talbot; Gillian Gilks	
1973	Redbridge	Ray Stevens	Margaret Beck	Ray Stevens; Mike Tredgett	Judy Hashman; Gillian Gilks	David Hunt; Gillian Gilks	
1974	Melksham	Derek Talbot	Margaret Beck	Elliot Stuart; Derek Talbot	Nora Gardner; Gillian Gilks	Derek Talbot; Gillian Gilks	
1975	Nottingham	Paul Whetnall	Margaret Beck	David Eddy; Eddy Sutton	Susan Whetnall; Margaret Boxall	Derek Talbot; Gillian Gilks	
1976	Alton	Paul Whetnall	Gillian Gilks	Ray Stevens; Mike Tredgett	Susan Whetnall; Gillian Gilks	Derek Talbot; Gillian Gilks	
1977	Luton	Ray Stevens	Margaret Lockwood	Ray Stevens; Mike Tredgett	Barbara Giles; Gillian Gilks	Mike Tredgett; Nora Gardner	
1978	Coventry	Derek Talbot	Gillian Gilks	Ray Stevens; Mike Tredgett	Nora Perry; Anne Statt	Mike Tredgett; Nora Perry	
1979	Coventry	Ray Stevens	Gillian Gilks	Ray Stevens; Mike Tredgett	Gillian Gilks; Jane Webster	Mike Tredgett; Nora Perry	
1980	Coventry	Ray Stevens	Gillian Gilks	Ray Stevens; Mike Tredgett	Nora Perry; Karen Puttick	Mike Tredgett; Nora Perry	
1981	Coventry	Ray Stevens	Gillian Gilks	Ray Stevens; Mike Tredgett	Karen Bridge; Barbara Sutton	Mike Tredgett; Nora Perry	
1982	Coventry	Steve Baddeley	Jane Webster	Martin Dew; Duncan Bridge	Nora Perry; Jane Webster	Martin Dew; Gillian Gilks	
1983	Coventry	Kevin Jolly	Karen Beckman	Martin Dew; Mike Tredgett	Nora Perry; Jane Webster	Mike Tredgett; Gillian Clark	
1984	Coventry	Andy Goode	Fiona Elliott	Martin Dew; Mike Tredgett	Gillian Gilks; Paula Kilvington	Martin Dew; Gillian Gilks	
1985	Coventry	Steve Baddeley	Fiona Elliott	Steve Baddeley; Mike Tredgett	Gillian Clark; Gillian Gowers	Dipak Tailor; Gillian Gilks	
1986	Woking	Darren Hall	Helen Troke	Nigel Tier; Andy Goode	Helen Troke; Gillian Gowers	Nigel Tier; Gillian Gowers	
1987	Crawley	Steve Baddeley	Fiona Elliott	Steve Baddeley; Andy Goode	Gillian Clark; Gillian Gowers	Andy Goode; Fiona Elliott	
1988	Crawley	Darren Hall	Sally Podger	Martin Dew; Andy Goode	Gillian Clark; Gillian Gowers	Martin Dew; Gillian Gowers	
1989	Crawley	Darren Hall	Fiona Smith	Martin Dew; Steve Baddeley	Gillian Clark; Sara Sankey	Andy Goode; Gillian Gowers	
1990	Crawley	Darren Hall	Fiona Smith	Mike Brown; Andy Goode	Gillian Clark; Gillian Gowers	Andy Goode; Gillian Clark	
1991	Torbay	Darren Hall	Julie Bradbury	Nick Ponting; Dave Wright	Gillian Gowers; Joanne Muggeridge	Andy Goode; Gillian Gowers	
1992	Torbay	Anders Nielsen	Fiona Smith	Andy Goode; Chris Hunt	Gillian Clark; Julie Bradbury	Nick Ponting; Joanne Goode	
1993	Norwich	Darren Hall	Suzanne Louis-Lane	Julian Robertson; Dave Wright	Gillian Clark; Gillian Gowers	Nick Ponting; Gillian Clark	
1994	Norwich	Darren Hall	Suzanne Louis-Lane	Chris Hunt; Simon Archer	Joanne Wright (Goode); Gillian Gowers	Nick Ponting; Joanne Wright (Goode)	
1995	Norwich	Anders Nielsen	Julia Mann	Chris Hunt; Simon Archer	Joanne Wright (Goode); Julie Bradbury	Nick Ponting; Joanne Wright (Goode)	
1996	Norwich	Darren Hall	Tanya Groves	Chris Hunt; Simon Archer	Joanne Wright (Goode); Julie Bradbury	Simon Archer; Julie Bradbury	
1997	Norwich	Peter Knowles	Julia Mann	Chris Hunt; Simon Archer	Nichola Beck; Joanne Davies	Simon Archer; Joanne Goode	
1998	Haywards Heath	Darren Hall	Julia Mann	Chris Hunt; Simon Archer	Joanne Goode; Donna Kellogg	Simon Archer; Joanne Goode	
1999	Haywards Heath	Darren Hall	Julia Mann	Chris Hunt; Simon Archer	Sara Sankey; Ella Miles	Simon Archer; Joanne Goode	
2000	Burgess Hill	Colin Haughton	Julia Mann	Simon Archer; Nathan Robertson	Sara Sankey; Ella Miles	Ian Sullivan; Gail Emms	
2001	Burgess Hill	Colin Haughton	Julia Mann	Simon Archer; Nathan Robertson	Gail Emms; Joanne Wright (Nicholas)	Simon Archer; Joanne Goode	
2002	Burgess Hill	Mark Constable	Julia Mann	Nathan Robertson; Anthony Clark	Gail Emms; Natalie Munt	Nathan Robertson; Gail Emms	
2003	Burgess Hill	Colin Haughton	Julia Mann	Nathan Robertson; Anthony Clark	Gail Emms; Donna Kellogg	Nathan Robertson; Gail Emms	
2004	Manchester	Aamir Ghaffar	Tracey Hallam	Nathan Robertson; Anthony Clark	Ella Tripp; Joanne Wright (Nicholas)	Simon Archer; Donna Kellogg	
2005	Manchester	Aamir Ghaffar	Elizabeth Cann	Simon Archer; Anthony Clark	Gail Emms; Donna Kellogg	Nathan Robertson; Gail Emms	
2006	Manchester	Nick Kidd	Tracey Hallam	Robert Blair; Anthony Clark	Gail Emms; Donna Kellogg	Nathan Robertson; Donna Kellogg	
2007	Manchester	Nick Kidd	Elizabeth Cann	Robert Blair; Anthony Clark	Gail Emms; Donna Kellogg	Anthony Clark; Donna Kellogg	
2008	Manchester	Rajiv Ouseph	Elizabeth Cann	Nathan Robertson; Anthony Clark	Tracey Hallam; Donna Kellogg	Anthony Clark; Donna Kellogg	
2009	Manchester	Rajiv Ouseph	Jill Pittard	Nathan Robertson; Anthony Clark	Suzanne Rayappan; Donna Kellogg	Anthony Clark; Donna Kellogg	
2010	Manchester	Rajiv Ouseph	Elizabeth Cann	Nathan Robertson; Anthony Clark	Jenny Wallwork; Gabby White	Nathan Robertson; Jenny Wallwork	
2011	Manchester	Rajiv Ouseph	Nicola Cerfontyne	Nathan Robertson; Chris Langridge	Jenny Wallwork; Gabby White	Nathan Robertson; Jenny Wallwork	
2012	Middlebrook	Rajiv Ouseph	Elizabeth Cann	Chris Adcock; Andrew Ellis	Jenny Wallwork; Gabby White	Chris Adcock; Gabby White	
2013	Manchester	Rajiv Ouseph	Sarah Walker	Chris Langridge; Peter Mills	Gabby Adcock; Lauren Smith	Chris Langridge; Heather Olver	
2014	Milton Keynes	Rajiv Ouseph	Sarah Walker	Chris Adcock; Andrew Ellis	Gabby Adcock; Lauren Smith	Chris Adcock; Gabby Adcock	
2015	Crawley	Sam Parsons	Nicola Cerfontyne	Chris Langridge; Marcus Ellis	Heather Olver; Lauren Smith	Chris Adcock; Gabby Adcock	
2016	Derbyshire	Rajiv Ouseph	Fontaine Chapman	Chris Langridge; Marcus Ellis	Heather Olver; Lauren Smith	Chris Adcock; Gabby Adcock	
2017	High Wycombe	Alex Lane	Chloe Birch	Tom Wolfenden; Peter Briggs	Lauren Smith; Sarah Walker	Ben Lane; Jessica Pugh	
2018	High Wycombe	Toby Penty	Chloe Birch	Matthew Clare; Michael Roe	Lauren Smith; Jessica Pugh	Marcus Ellis; Lauren Smith	
2019	Winchester	Rajiv Ouseph	Chloe Birch	Ben Lane; Sean Vendy	Chloe Birch; Lauren Smith	Ben Lane; Jessica Pugh	
2020	Winchester	Alex Lane	Chloe Birch	Tom Wolfenden; Gregory Mairs	Chloe Birch; Lauren Smith	Max Flynn; Fee Teng Liew	
2021	Milton Keynes	Johnnie Torjussen	Abigail Holden	Matthew Clare; Ethan van Leeuwen	Jessica Hopton; Jessica Pugh	Callum Hemming; Jessica Pugh	
2022	Milton Keynes	Johnnie Torjussen	Georgina Bland	Ben Lane; Sean Vendy	Abbygael Harris; Annie Lado	Callum Hemming; Jessica Pugh	
2023	David Ross Sports Village	Johnnie Torjussen	Kirby Ngan	Ben Lane; Sean Vendy	Chloe Birch; Jenny Wallwork	Gregory Mairs; Jenny Moore	
2024	David Ross Sports Village	Harry Huang	Kirby Ngan	Ben Lane; Sean Vendy	Chloe Birch; Jenny Mairs	Gregory Mairs; Jenny Mairs	
2025	David Ross Sports Village	Harry Huang	Freya Patel-Redfearn	Barney Chua Yue Chern; Zach Russ	Abbygael Harris; Elizabeth Tolman	Ethan Van Leeuwen; Estelle Van Leeuwen	
2026	National Cycling Centre	Harry Huang	Leona Lee	Ben Lane; Sean Vendy	Lisa Curtin; Sian Kelly	Samuel Jones; Elizabeth Tolman	

== Multiple titles (6 or more) ==
=== Men ===
No.	Name	Singles	Doubles	Mixed	Total
1	Mike Tredgett	0	10	6	16
2	Simon Archer	0	9	6	15
	Nathan Robertson	0	9	6	15
4	Ray Stevens	5	7	0	12
	Anthony Clark	0	9	3	12
6	Derek Talbot	4	3	4	11
7	Darren Hall	10	0	0	10
	Andy Goode	1	5	4	10
9	Rajiv Ouseph	9	0	0	9
	Roger Mills	3	2	4	9
11	Martin Dew	0	5	3	8
12	Chris Hunt	0	7	0	7
13	Ben Lane	0	5	2	7
	Steve Baddeley	3	3	0	6
	Chris Adcock	0	2	4	6

=== Women ===
No.	Name	Singles	Doubles	Mixed	Total
1	Gillian Gilks	5	7	9	21
2	Gillian Gowers	0	8	4	12
	Donna Kellogg	0	7	5	12
4	Joanne Goode	0	4	7	11
5	Nora Perry	0	5	5	10
	Gillian Clark	0	7	3	10
	Gail Emms	0	6	4	10
8	Gabby Adcock	0	5	4	9
	Lauren Smith	0	8	1	9
10	Julia Mann	8	0	0	8
	Chloe Birch	4	4	0	8
12	Fiona Smith	6	0	1	7
13	Margaret Boxall	0	5	1	6
	Jenny Wallwork	0	4	2	6
	Susan Whetnall	0	6	0	6
	Margaret Beck	5	1	0	6
