= Valence Alpes International =

International badminton tournament in France

The Valence Alpes International, also known as the Valence Alpes International Challenge, is an international badminton tournament held in Valence, Drôme, France. First held in 2026, the tournament is classified as a BWF International Challenge event on the BWF Continental Circuit and forms part of the Badminton Europe Elite Circuit, organised by Badminton Europe.

The competition is organised by the Ligue Auvergne-Rhône-Alpes de Badminton, in cooperation with the Comité de Badminton Ardèche Drôme and Valence Badminton Club.

== History ==
France's International Challenge-level event on the European circuit had previously been staged as the Nantes International. In February 2026, the French Badminton Federation announced that a new event at the same level would be held in the Auvergne-Rhône-Alpes region under the name Valence Alpes International, with the regional badminton league acting as its principal organiser.

The inaugural edition took place from 11 to 14 June 2026 at the Palais des Sports Pierre Mendès-France in Valence and offered total prize money of US$20,000. Its entry list comprised approximately 250 players representing 43 nationalities, competing in men's and women's singles, men's and women's doubles, and mixed doubles.

During its inaugural edition, the tournament became the first international badminton competition in Europe to use synthetic shuttlecocks. The shuttlecocks used carbon shafts and synthetic feathers instead of natural feathers. Their introduction followed the Badminton World Federation's approval of certain synthetic shuttlecocks for use at Grade 3 and international junior tournaments.

The titles at the inaugural edition were shared among players representing France, England, and India. Players representing the host country won three of the five titles: Anna Tatranova won the women's singles, while Maël Cattoen and William Villeger won the men's doubles and Natan Begga and Elsa Jacob won the mixed doubles.

== List of winners ==
| Year | Men's singles | Women's singles | Men's doubles | Women's doubles | Mixed doubles | Ref. |
|---|---|---|---|---|---|---|
| 2026 | (India) Rithvik Sanjeevi | (France) Anna Tatranova | (France) Maël Cattoen (France) William Villeger | (England) Abbygael Harris (England) Estelle van Leeuwen | (France) Natan Begga (France) Elsa Jacob | |

== Performances by nation ==
As of 2026 edition

| No. | Nation | MS | WS | MD | WD | XD | Total |
|---|---|---|---|---|---|---|---|
| 1 | France* | | 1 | 1 | | 1 | 3 |
| 2 | England | | | | 1 | | 1 |
| 2 | India | 1 | | | | | 1 |
| Total | | 1 | 1 | 1 | 1 | 1 | 5 |

* Host nation
