= 2016 Scottish Open =

2016 Scottish Open may refer to:

- 2016 Scottish Open (badminton)
- 2016 Scottish Open (snooker)
- 2016 Scottish Open (darts)
- 2016 Scottish Open (golf)
- 2016 Scottish Open (speedway)
