= Colin Beacom =

English badminton player

Personal information
- Nationality: British (English)
- Born: October 1937 Lambeth, London, England

Sport
- Sport: Badminton
- Club: Surrey Badminton Club

Colin James Beacom (born October 1937), is a male former international badminton player who competed for England. He was associated with Surrey Badminton Club.

== Badminton career ==
Beacom won three events in the English National Badminton Championships, the mixed doubles in 1964 with Jenny Pritchard and the men's doubles with Tony Jordan in 1966 and 1968.
In addition, he won the 1963 Irish Open singles, the 1964 Scottish Open men's doubles, and the 1973 Scottish Open singles. Beacom won on the other side of the Atlantic when he captured the 1967 Canada Open men's doubles with Roger Mills.

He represented England at the 1966 British Commonwealth Gamesin Kingston, Jamaica in the singles, doubles, and mixed doubles events, narrowly missing a bronze medal in men's doubles. After retiring from high level national and international competition, he kept playing on the county and senior (age division) levels and won several All England senior events in the 1980s. Beacom was also a president of his old badminton club, Surrey, from 1990 until 1996.

== Achievements ==
=== International tournaments ===
Men's singles
Year	Tournament	Opponent	Score	Result
1963	Irish Open	(England) Trevor Coates	15–9, 15–11	(gold) Winner
1973	Scottish Open	(Scotland) Nicol McCloy	18–16, 9–15, 15–9	(gold) Winner

Men's doubles
Year	Tournament	Partner	Opponent	Score	Result
1964	Scottish Open	(England) Kenneth Derrick	(Scotland) Robert McCoig (Scotland) W. Frank Shannon	15–9, 6–15, 18–17	(gold) Winner
1965	Irish Open	(England) Tony Jordan	(England) David Horton (England) Roger Mills	15–12, 9–15, 10–15	(silver) Runner-up
1965	Dutch Open	(England) Tony Jordan	(Denmark) Klaus Kaagaard (Denmark) Ole Mertz	4–15, 7–15	(silver) Runner-up
1967	Irish Open	(England) Tony Jordan	(England) David Horton (England) Roger Mills	8–15, 15–3, 15–18	(silver) Runner-up
1967	Canadian Open	(England) Roger Mills	(Denmark) Erland Kops (Canada) Rolf Paterson	15–6, 15–7	(gold) Winner
