= Roger Mills (badminton) =

English badminton player and coach

Roger J Mills
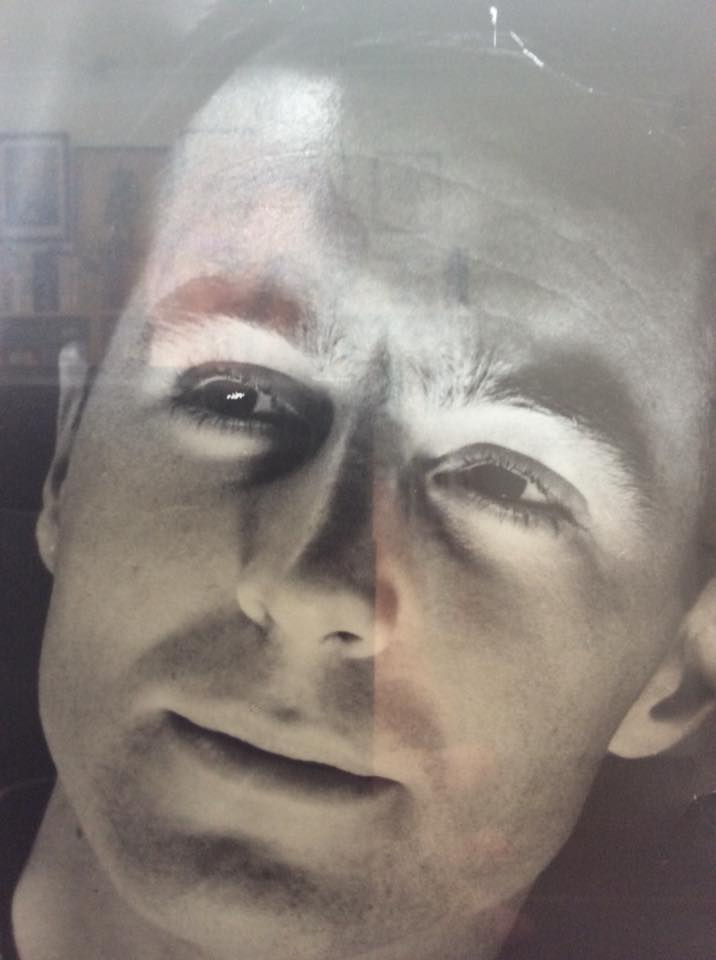

Personal information
- Born: 3 March 1942 Battersea, Greater London, England
- Died: 16 October 2020 (aged 78) Bletchley, Buckinghamshire, England

Sport
- Country: England
- Sport: Badminton
- Handedness: Right
Medal record
Men's badminton
Representing England
Commonwealth Games
Gold medal – first place	1966 Kingston	Mixed doubles
Silver medal – second place	1970 Edinburgh	Mixed doubles
Bronze medal – third place	1966 Kingston	Men's doubles
European Championships
Silver medal – second place	1968 Bochum	Men's doubles
Silver medal – second place	1968 Bochum	Mixed doubles

Roger Jeffrey Mills (3 March 1942 – 16 October 2020) was an English international badminton player and coach.

== Biography ==
Mills won nine English National titles; the singles three years running, 1965, 1966, and 1967, the doubles in 1967 and 1970 and the mixed doubles 1965, 1968, 1969 and 1971.

He won the 1969 All England Badminton Championships in mixed doubles with Gillian Perrin when this tournament was considered the sport's premier event (aside from the international team world championships, Thomas Cup and Uber Cup).

Mills competed for te England team in the 1966 British Empire and Commonwealth Games in Kingston, Jamaica, winning the gold medal, in the mixed doubles with Angela Bairstow and a bronze medal, in the men's doubles with David Horton.

Four years later he won a silver medal, in the mixed doubles with Perrin at the 1970 British Commonwealth Games in Edinburgh.

He represented Surrey and spent many of his years coaching in Surrey, most notably at Guildford University and at the Wimbledon Squash and Badminton Centre.

After his playing career, Roger continued his love of the sport of Badminton by becoming one of the leading coaches in the country where he took the position of Senior English National Coach before moving his focus to the development of youth badminton. In addition, Roger was the Part-Time Scottish National Coach in 1976 until 1980 where he provided new age coaching techniques to a generation of Scottish Badminton champions.

Mills' coaching and dedication to badminton resulted in the development of many champions at all ages and levels. Mills has written and published a number of books on badminton and is a 1974 Winston Churchill Fellowship.

== All England Badminton Championships ==
Year	Event	Event	Partner	Result
1969	All England Badminton Championships	Mixed Doubles	Gillian Perrin	Winner
1970	All England Badminton Championships	Mixed Doubles	Gillian Perrin	Semi-Finals

== Commonwealth Games ==
Year		Event	Partner	Result
1966	Commonwealth Games	Mixed Doubles	Angela Bairstow	Gold
1966	Commonwealth Games	Men's Doubles	David Horton	Bronze

Year		Event	Partner	Result
1970	Commonwealth Games	Mixed Doubles	Gillian Perrin.	Silver

== English National Badminton Championships ==
Year	Title	Event	Partner	Result
1965	English Nationals	Men's Singles	n/a	Winner
1965	English Nationals	Mixed Doubles	Margaret Barrand	Winner
1966	English Nationals.	Men's Singles	n/a	Winner
1967	English Nationals	Men's Singles	n/a	Winner
1967	English Nationals.	Men's Doubles	David Horton	Winner
1968	English Nationals	Mixed Doubles	Gillian Perrin	Winner
1969	English Nationals	Mixed Doubles	Gillian Perrin	Winner
1970	English Nationals	Men's Doubles	Tony Jordan	Winner

Juniors

Year	Title	Event	Partner	Result
1958	English National Juniors	Men's Singles	n/a	Winner
1958	English National Juniors	Mixed Doubles	M. K. Bishop	Winner
1959	English National Juniors	Men's Singles	n/a	Winner
1959	English National Juniors	Men's Doubles	D. J. Minton	Winner
1959	English National Juniors	Mixed Doubles	Angela Bairstow	Winner
1960	English National Juniors	Men's Singles	n/a	Winner
1960	English National Juniors	Men's Doubles	D. J. Minton	Winner
1960	English National Juniors	Mixed Doubles	Angela Bairstow	Winner

== Open Badminton Championships ==
Year	Title	Event	Partner	Result
1964	Austrian Open.	Mixed Doubles	Michael Rawlings	Winner
1965	Irish Open	Men's Doubles	David Horton	Winner
1966	Scottish Open	Men's Doubles	David Horton	Winner
1967	Irish Open	Men's Doubles	David Horton	Winner
1967	Irish Open	Mixed Doubles	Iris Rogers	Winner
1967	Welsh Open	Men's Singles	n/a	Winner
1967	Welsh Open	Men's Doubles	Robert S. McCoig	Winner
1967	Canadian Open	Men's Doubles	Colin Beacom	Winner
1967	Canadian Open	Mixed Doubles	Sharon Whitacker	Winner
1968	Welsh Open	Men's Singles	n/a	Winner
1968	Welsh Open	Mixed Singles	Julie Charles	Winner
1968	Welsh Open	Men's Doubles	J. G. Pearson	Winner
1968	European Championships	Mixed Doubles	Gillian Perrin	Runner Up
1968	Swedish Open	Mixed Doubles	Gillian Gilks	Winner
1969	Scottish Open	Mixed Doubles	Susan Whetnall	Winner
1970	Scottish Open	Mixed Doubles	Gillian Gilks	Winner
1971	Scottish Open	Mixed Doubles	Gillian Gilks	Winner

== Winston Churchill Fellow ==
The Fellowship was established by public subscription in 1965 as the living legacy of Sir Winston Churchill. Its stated mission is to enable individuals to learn from international experiences for the benefit of the United Kingdom.

Roger was awarded the Winston Churchill Fellowship for his overseas research on Badminton in China.

Award	Year	Category	Award
Winston Churchill Fellowship	1974	Adventure, Sport & Exploration	Coaching of badminton

== Published books ==
Author	Name	Publisher	Year	ISBN
Roger Mills & Eric Butler	Modern Badminton	Stanley Paul	1966	1547628077MEP
Roger Mills	Tackle Badminton	Stanley Paul	1974	ISBN 9780091192204
Roger Mills	Tackle Badminton	Hutchinson	1977	ISBN 9780091290214
Roger Mills	Badminton	EP Sport	1977	ISBN 978-0715805596
Roger Mills	Badminton	Sterling	1980	ISBN 978-0715805954
Roger Mills	Pocket Guide To Badminton Tactics	Bell & Hyman	1985	ISBN 9780713525410
