= Gregory Mairs =

English badminton player (born 1994)

Personal information
- Born: 7 December 1994 (age 31) Manchester, England
- Height: 1.81 m (5 ft 11 in)
- Spouse: Jenny Mairs (m. 2023)

Sport
- Country: England
- Sport: Badminton
- Handedness: Left
- Retired: March 2025

Men's & mixed doubles
- Highest ranking: 71 (MD, 13 July 2017); 28 (XD with Jenny Mairs, 17 January 2023)
- BWF profile
Medal record
Men's badminton
Representing England
European Mixed Team Championships
Bronze medal – third place	2023 Aire-sur-la-Lys	Mixed team

Gregory Mairs (born 7 December 1994) is an English former professional badminton player.

== Career ==
Mairs started playing badminton at the age of six in Weaverham Leisure Centre.

In 2023, he won his second national doubles title at the English National Badminton Championships, at the David Ross Sports Village in Nottingham, partnering with Jenny Moore. The following year, Mairs successfully defended the title, this time as a husband and wife team.

In March 2025, after having reached the quarter-finals in the All England Open he announced his retirement through his YouTube channel, Badminton Insight.

== Personal life ==
He married his mixed doubles partner Jenny Moore (now Jenny Mairs) on 27 July 2023.

== Achievements ==
=== BWF International Challenge/Series (7 titles, 9 runners-up) ===
Men's doubles
Year	Tournament	Partner	Opponent	Score	Result
2016	Polish International	(England) Christopher Coles	(Chinese Taipei) Lu Ching-yao (Chinese Taipei) Yang Po-han	16–21, 9–21	(silver) Runner-up
2018	Turkey International	(England) Peter Briggs	(Indonesia) Leo Rolly Carnando (Indonesia) Daniel Marthin	14–21, 21–14, 21–23	(silver) Runner-up
2019	Estonian International	(England) Peter Briggs	(Singapore) Danny Bawa Chrisnanta (Singapore) Loh Kean Hean	22–20, 21–18	(gold) Winner

Mixed doubles
Year	Tournament	Partner	Opponent	Score	Result
2014	Spanish International	(England) Jenny Moore	(Germany) Marvin Seidel (Germany) Linda Efler	16–21, 12–21	(silver) Runner-up
2017	Slovenian International	(England) Jenny Moore	(Denmark) Mikkel Mikkelsen (Denmark) Mai Surrow	12–21, 13–21	(silver) Runner-up
2017	Norwegian International	(England) Jenny Moore	(Denmark) Lasse Mølhede (Denmark) Alexandra Bøje	21–11, 19–21, 21–11	(gold) Winner
2017	Irish Open	(England) Jenny Moore	(Republic of Ireland) Sam Magee (Republic of Ireland) Chloe Magee	21–16, 21–13	(gold) Winner
2018	Estonian International	(England) Jenny Moore	(Germany) Peter Käsbauer (Germany) Olga Konon	14–21, 12–21	(silver) Runner-up
2018	Slovenian International	(England) Jenny Moore	(Denmark) Kristoffer Knudsen (Denmark) Isabella Nielsen	13–21, 21–16, 21–14	(gold) Winner
2019	Estonian International	(England) Victoria Williams	(Singapore) Danny Bawa Chrisnanta (Singapore) Tan Wei Han	18–21, 21–14, 15–21	(silver) Runner-up
2019	Slovenian International	(England) Victoria Williams	(Finland) Anton Kaisti (Finland) Inalotta Suutarinen	21–16, 21–17	(gold) Winner
2022	Irish Open	(England) Jenny Moore	(Denmark) Andreas Søndergaard (Denmark) Iben Bergstein	21–13, 21–16	(gold) Winner
2022	Bahrain International	(England) Jenny Moore	(Thailand) Ruttanapak Oupthong (Thailand) Jhenicha Sudjaipraparat	21–17, 21–16	(gold) Winner
2023	Irish Open	(England) Jenny Mairs	(Singapore) Terry Hee (Singapore) Jessica Tan	17–21, 21–18, 15–21	(silver) Runner-up
2023	Bahrain International	(England) Jenny Mairs	(China) Zhou Zhihong (China) Yang Jiayi	26–28, 21–16, 20–22	(silver) Runner-up
2023	Welsh International	(England) Jenny Mairs	(Germany) Jan Colin Völker (Germany) Stine Küspert	20–22, 16–21	(silver) Runner-up

BWF International Challenge tournament
BWF International Series tournament
BWF Future Series tournament
