= Ethan van Leeuwen =

English badminton player (born 2001)

Personal information
- Born: 8 April 2001 (age 25)

Sport
- Country: England
- Sport: Badminton

Men's & mixed doubles
- Highest ranking: 49 (MD with Callum Hemming, 2 September 2025); 71 (XD with Annie Lado, 19 March 2024)
- BWF profile
Medal record
Men's badminton
Representing England
European Mixed Team Championships
Bronze medal – third place	2023 Aire-sur-la-Lys	Mixed team
Bronze medal – third place	2025 Baku	Mixed team
European Men's Team Championships
Bronze medal – third place	2024 Łódź	Men's team

Ethan van Leeuwen (born 8 April 2001) is a badminton player from England.

== Career ==
In 2021, he became the national champion of England after winning the men's doubles, with Matthew Clare at the 2021 English National Badminton Championships.

== Achievements ==
=== BWF International Challenge/Series (4 titles, 3 runners-up) ===
Men's doubles
Year	Tournament	Partner	Opponent	Score	Result
2022	Dutch Open	(England) Callum Hemming	(Chinese Taipei) Chiu Hsiang-chieh (Chinese Taipei) Yang Ming-tse	16–21, 13–21	(silver) Runner-up
2023	Polish International	(England) Callum Hemming	(Poland) Miłosz Bochat (Poland) Paweł Śmiłowski	21–16, 21–12	(gold) Winner
2023	Dutch Open	(England) Callum Hemming	(England) Rory Easton (England) Zach Russ	21–23, 17–21	(silver) Runner-up

Mixed doubles
Year	Tournament	Partner	Opponent	Score	Result
2019	Iceland International	(England) Annie Lado	(Iceland) Kristofer Darri Finnsson (Iceland) Margrét Jóhannsdóttir	13–21, 18–21	(silver) Runner-up
2023	Austrian Open	(England) Annie Lado	(Malaysia) Lim Tze Jian (Malaysia) Desiree Siow	21–13, 21–13	(gold) Winner
2024	Portugal International	(England) Chloe Birch	(England) Rory Easton (England) Lizzie Tolman	18–21, 21–6, 21–17	(gold) Winner
2025	Estonian International	(England) Abbygael Harris	(France) Grégoire Deschamps (France) Margot Lambert	21–11, 21–14	(gold) Winner

BWF International Challenge tournament
BWF International Series tournament
BWF Future Series tournament
