= Jenny Mairs =

English badminton player (born 1995)

Jennifer Mairs
Personal information
- Full name: Jennifer Mairs
- Born: Jennifer Moore; 31 August 1995 (age 31) Chester, Cheshire, England
- Height: 1.68 m (5 ft 6 in)
- Spouse: Gregory Mairs (m. 2023)

Sport
- Country: England
- Sport: Badminton
- Handedness: Left
- Retired: March 2025

Women's & mixed doubles
- Highest ranking: 50 (WD, 7 July 2017); 28 (XD with Gregory Mairs, 17 January 2023)
- BWF profile
Medal record
Women's badminton
Representing England
European Mixed Team Championships
Bronze medal – third place	2023 Aire-sur-la-Lys	Mixed team

Jennifer Mairs (née Moore; born 31 August 1995) is an English former professional badminton player.

== Career ==
In 2023, Moore won her first national doubles title (partnering Gregory Mairs) at the English National Badminton Championships, held at the David Ross Sports Village in Nottingham. The following year, Mairs successfully defended the title, this time as a husband and wife team.

In March 2025, after having reached the quarter-finals in the All England Open she announced her retirement through her YouTube channel, Badminton Insight.

== Personal life ==
She married her mixed doubles partner Gregory Mairs on 27 July 2023. They run the YouTube channel Badminton Insight together.

== Achievements ==
=== BWF International Challenge/Series (7 titles, 11 runners-up) ===
Women's doubles
Year	Tournament	Partner	Opponent	Score	Result
2014	Polish International	(England) Victoria Williams	(Turkey) Cemre Fere (Turkey) Ebru Tunalı	7–11, 11–4, 8–11, 6–11	(silver) Runner-up
2017	Slovenian International	(England) Victoria Williams	(Russia) Olga Arkhangelskaya (Russia) Natalia Rogova	20–22, 17–21	(silver) Runner-up
2017	Polish International	(England) Victoria Williams	(India) K. Maneesha (India) Arathi Sara Sunil	21–19, 24–22	(gold) Winner
2017	Irish Open	(England) Victoria Williams	(France) Émilie Lefel (France) Anne Tran	16–21, 12–21	(silver) Runner-up
2018	Estonian International	(England) Jessica Hopton	(Russia) Ekaterina Bolotova (Russia) Alina Davletova	10–21, 10–21	(silver) Runner-up
2019	Slovenian International	(England) Victoria Williams	(India) Pooja Dandu (India) Sanjana Santosh	21–14, 22–20	(gold) Winner
2019	Belarus International	(England) Victoria Williams	(China) Yu Xiaohan (China) Zhang Shuxian	12–21, 15–21	(silver) Runner-up

Mixed doubles
Year	Tournament	Partner	Opponent	Score	Result
2014	Spanish International	(England) Gregory Mairs	(Germany) Marvin Seidel (Germany) Linda Efler	16–21, 12–21	(silver) Runner-up
2017	Slovenian International	(England) Gregory Mairs	(Denmark) Mikkel Mikkelsen (Denmark) Mai Surrow	12–21, 13–21	(silver) Runner-up
2017	Norwegian International	(England) Gregory Mairs	(Denmark) Lasse Mølhede (Denmark) Alexandra Bøje	21–11, 19–21, 21–11	(gold) Winner
2017	Irish Open	(England) Gregory Mairs	(Republic of Ireland) Sam Magee (Republic of Ireland) Chloe Magee	21–16, 21–13	(gold) Winner
2018	Estonian International	(England) Gregory Mairs	(Germany) Peter Käsbauer (Germany) Olga Konon	14–21, 12–21	(silver) Runner-up
2018	Slovenian International	(England) Gregory Mairs	(Denmark) Kristoffer Knudsen (Denmark) Isabella Nielsen	13–21, 21–16, 21–14	(gold) Winner
2022	Irish Open	(England) Gregory Mairs	(Denmark) Andreas Søndergaard (Denmark) Iben Bergstein	21–13, 21–16	(gold) Winner
2022	Bahrain International	(England) Gregory Mairs	(Thailand) Ruttanapak Oupthong (Thailand) Jhenicha Sudjaipraparat	21–17, 21–16	(gold) Winner
2023	Irish Open	(England) Gregory Mairs	(Singapore) Terry Hee (Singapore) Jessica Tan	17–21, 21–18, 15–21	(silver) Runner-up
2023	Bahrain International	(England) Gregory Mairs	(China) Zhou Zhihong (China) Yang Jiayi	26–28, 21–16, 20–22	(silver) Runner-up
2023	Welsh International	(England) Gregory Mairs	(Germany) Jan Colin Völker (Germany) Stine Küspert	20–22, 16–21	(silver) Runner-up

BWF International Challenge tournament
BWF International Series tournament
BWF Future Series tournament
