= Kirby Ngan =

English badminton player (born 1998)

Personal information
- Born: Ngan Miu Lin; 27 March 1998 (age 28) Langford, Bristol, England

Sport
- Sport: Badminton
- Highest ranking: 294 (2 May 2023)
Medal record
Women's badminton
Representing England
European Mixed Team Championships
Bronze medal – third place	2025 Baku	Mixed team

Kirby Ngan Miu Lin (born 27 March 1998) is an English badminton player.

== Early life ==
Ngan was born 27 March 1998.

== Career ==
In 2016, she made her debut for England during the 2016 European Men's and Women's Team Badminton Championships, aged just 18.

In 2023, she won her first national title at the English National Badminton Championships after winning the women's singles. She also won the women's singles at the 2023 BUCS Individual Championships. The following year in 2024, Ngan successfully defended the title.
