= Nicola Cerfontyne =

English badminton player (born 1987)

Personal information
- Born: 12 September 1987 (age 38) Bournemouth, England
- Height: 1.65 m (5 ft 5 in)

Sport
- Country: England
- Sport: Badminton
- Handedness: Right

Women's singles
- Highest ranking: 93 (3 January 2013)
- BWF profile

Nicola Cerfontyne (born 12 September 1987) is an English former badminton player and a two times national champion.

== Biography ==
Cerfontyne became a double English National champion after winning the English National Badminton Championships women's singles title in 2011 and 2015.

In 2017, she moved to Denmark after joining the Holbaek Centre of Excellence as a coach.
