= Abbygael Harris =

English badminton player (born 2001)

Personal information
- Born: 18 May 2001 (age 25)
- Height: 1.62 m (5 ft 4 in)

Sport
- Country: England
- Sport: Badminton

Women's & mixed doubles
- Highest ranking: 44 (WD with Lizzie Tolman, 23 June 2026); 65 (WD with Annie Lado, 26 September 2023); 77 (XD with Brandon Yap, 21 May 2024)
- Current ranking: 47 (WD with Lizzie Tolman, 30 June 2026)
Medal record
Women's badminton
Representing England
European Mixed Team Championships
Bronze medal – third place	2025 Baku	Mixed team

Abbygael Harris (born 18 May 2001) is an English badminton player.

== Career ==
In 2022, she won her first national title at the English National Badminton Championships after winning the women's doubles with Annie Lado.

As of 23 August 2023, she reached a doubles world ranking high (with Lado) of 66.

In 2026, Harris won the women's doubles title with Tolman at the Polish Open.

== Achievements ==
=== BWF International Challenge/Series (7 titles, 3 runners-up) ===
Women's doubles

Year	Tournament	Partner	Opponent	Score	Result
2022	Luxembourg Open	(England) Hope Warner	(Indonesia) Titis Maulida Rahma (Indonesia) Bernadine Wardana	16–21, 21–16, 22–20	(gold) Winner
2022	Hungarian International	(England) Annie Lado	(England) Lizzie Tolman (England) Hope Warner	21–16, 16–21, 22–20	(gold) Winner
2023	Iceland International	(England) Annie Lado	(Italy) Katharina Fink (Italy) Yasmine Hamza	21–13, 21–18	(gold) Winner
2023	Polish International	(England) Annie Lado	(Turkey) Bengisu Erçetin (Turkey) Nazlıcan İnci	16–21, 10–21	(silver) Runner-up
2024	Portugal International	(England) Annie Lado	(England) Chloe Birch (England) Estelle van Leeuwen	16–21, 9–21	(silver) Runner-up
2024	Nantes International	(England) Annie Lado	(England) Chloe Birch (England) Estelle van Leeuwen	18–21, 9–21	(silver) Runner-up
2024	Hungarian International	(England) Lizzie Tolman	(Sweden) Malena Norrman (Austria) Xu Wei	19–21, 21–19, 21–14	(gold) Winner
2026	Polish Open	(England) Lizzie Tolman	(Japan) Rui Kiyama (Japan) Sona Yonemoto	23–21, 21–16	(gold) Winner
2026	Valence Alpes International	(England) Estelle van Leeuwen	(Individual Neutral Athletes) Anastasiia Boiarun (Individual Neutral Athletes) Daria Kharlampovich	21–18, 21–6	(gold) Winner

Mixed doubles
Year	Tournament	Partner	Opponent	Score	Result
2025	Estonian International	(England) Ethan van Leeuwen	(France) Grégoire Deschamps (France) Margot Lambert	21–11, 21–14	(gold) Winner

BWF International Challenge tournament
BWF International Series tournament
BWF Future Series tournament
