= Georgina Bland =

English badminton player (born 1992)

Personal information
- Born: 05 November 1992 (age 33) Surrey, England

Sport
- Sport: Badminton
- Highest ranking: 117 (7 June 2018)

Georgina Eileen Bland (born 5 November 1992) is an English badminton player.

== Career ==
In 2022, she won her first national title at the English National Badminton Championships after winning the women's singles.
