= Harry Huang =

English badminton player (born 2001)

Personal information
- Born: 25 August 2001 (age 25) Bedford, Bedfordshire, England

Sport
- Sport: Badminton
- Highest ranking: 52 (6 October 2026)
- Current ranking: 52 (6 October 2026)
Medal record
Men's badminton
Representing England
European Mixed Team Championships
Bronze medal – third place	2025 Baku	Mixed team
European Men's Team Championships
Bronze medal – third place	2026 Istanbul	Men's team

Harry Huang (Chinese: 黄涵瑞; pinyin: Huáng Hán Ruì; born 25 August 2001) is an English badminton player.

== Career ==
Huang started playing club badminton for the All Stars in Milton Keynes and won the U15 singles European gold medal. He attended the University of Nottingham.

Huang came to prominence in 2023, after winning the Egypt International in Cairo.

In 2024, he became the English singles champion. He was seeded number one for the men's singles at the English National Badminton Championships and justified his seeding beating Cholan Kayan in the final to win his first national title.

== Achievements ==
=== BWF International Challenge/Series (3 titles, 2 runners-up) ===
Men's singles

Year	Tournament	Opponent	Score	Result
2023	Egypt International	(France) Yanis Gaudin	21–11, 9–21, 22–20	(gold) Winner
2023	Hungarian International	(Denmark) Karan Rajan Rajarajan	21–18, 21–16	(gold) Winner
2025	Austrian Open	(Denmark) Magnus Johannesen	17–21, 14–21	(silver) Runner-up
2025	Turkey International	(Indonesia) Muhamad Yusuf	21–19, 11–21, 21–16	(gold) Winner
2025	Czech Open	(Indonesia) Muhamad Yusuf	14–21, 12–21	(silver) Runner-up

BWF International Challenge tournament
BWF International Series tournament
BWF Future Series tournament
