= Badminton England =

Badminton association

- Formation: 13 September 1893
- Type: National Sport Association
- Headquarters: Milton Keynes
- Affiliations: BEC, BWF
- Website: badmintonengland.co.uk

Badminton England is the national governing body for the sport of badminton in England. It aims to govern, encourage and develop the sport throughout England.

Originally established in 1893 as the Badminton Association of England in Portsmouth, the association is now based in Milton Keynes and has departments for Elite Play, Events, Membership, Development and Coaching. It closely liaises with the 41 Counties of England to provide support to the club and league structures.

The body was a founding member of the International Badminton Federation, since renamed to Badminton World Federation (BWF), which is the international governing body for the sport.

== National Badminton Centre ==
National Badminton Centre
- Interactive map of National Badminton Centre
- Address: Bradwell Rd, Loughton Lodge, Great Holm, MK8 9LA; Milton Keynes; England
- Coordinates: 52.038°N 0.785°W
- Elevation: 75 m (246 ft)
- Operator: Badminton England
- Event: Badminton
- Public transit: Milton Keynes Central railway station (Note: then walk via Milton Keynes redway network (about 0.75 miles (1.21 km) or taxi (about ten minutes).)

Website
- https://www.badmintonengland.co.uk/national-badminton-centre

The National Badminton Centre in Loughton, Milton Keynes is a purpose-built elite training facility that provides a base for the Great Britain and England badminton squads and has a number of badminton courts, meeting rooms and accommodation facilities. The facility is partly funded by commercial conference letting.

== See also ==
- All England Open Badminton Championships
- Badminton
- International Badminton Federation
- European Badminton Union
- English National Badminton Championships
