= Freya Redfearn =

English badminton player (born 2000)

Freya Patel-Redfearn
Personal information
- Born: 12 November 2000 (age 26) London, England

Sport
- Sport: Badminton
Medal record
Women's badminton
Representing England
European Mixed Team Championships
Bronze medal – third place	2025 Baku	Mixed team

Freya Patel-Redfearn (born 12 November 2000) is an English international badminton player. She has represented England at the Commonwealth Games.

== Biography ==
Patel-Redfearn won three medals at the 2016 English Youth Championships. She made her senior debut at the 2020 European Women's Team Badminton Championships group stage and in 2021 won two games at 2021 European Mixed Team Badminton Championships. She joined the BWF World tour in 2021. She reached the third round of the 2021 European Badminton Championships in Kyiv and the semi-finals of the Welsh International.

In 2022, she was selected for the women's singles and the mixed team events at the 2022 Commonwealth Games in Birmingham.

== Achievements ==
=== BWF International Challenge/Series (2 runners-up) ===
Women's singles
Year	Tournament	Opponent	Score	Result	Ref.
2023	Polish International	(Japan) Sorano Yoshikawa	12–21, 20–22	(silver) Runner-up	

Mixed doubles
Year	Tournament	Partner	Opponent	Score	Result
2019	Welsh International	(England) Hope Warner	(England) Abigail Holden (England) Lizzie Tolman	21–8, 15–21, 16–21	(silver) Runner-up

BWF International Challenge tournament
BWF International Series tournament
BWF Future Series tournament
