= 2018 Swiss Open (badminton) =

2018 badminton tournament in Basel

Tournament details
- Dates: 20–25 February
- Level: Super 300
- Total prize money: US$150,000
- Venue: St. Jakobshalle
- Location: Basel, Switzerland

Champions
- Men's singles: (India) Sameer Verma
- Women's singles: (Japan) Sayaka Takahashi
- Men's doubles: (Denmark) Mathias Boe (Denmark) Carsten Mogensen
- Women's doubles: (Japan) Ayako Sakuramoto (Japan) Yukiko Takahata
- Mixed doubles: (Germany) Mark Lamsfuß (Germany) Isabel Herttrich

The 2018 Swiss Open, officially the Yonex Swiss Open 2018, was a badminton tournament which took place at St. Jakobshalle in Switzerland from 20 to 25 February 2018 and had a total purse of $150,000.

== Tournament ==
The 2018 Swiss Open was the fifth tournament of the 2018 BWF World Tour and also part of the Swiss Open championships which had been held since 1955. This tournament was organized by Swiss Badminton with the sanction of the BWF.

=== Venue ===
This international tournament was held at St. Jakobshalle in Basel, Switzerland.

=== Point distribution ===
Below is a table with the point distribution for each phase of the tournament based on the BWF points system for the BWF World Tour Super 300 event.

Winner	Runner-up	3/4	5/8	9/16	17/32	33/64	65/128
7,000	5,950	4,900	3,850	2,750	1,670	660	320

=== Prize money ===
The total prize money for this tournament was US$150,000. Distribution of prize money was in accordance with BWF regulations.

Event	Winner	Finals	Semifinals	Quarterfinals	Last 16
Singles	$11,250	$5,700	$2,175	$900	$525
Doubles	$11,850	$5,700	$2,100	$1087.50	$562.50

== Men's singles ==
=== Seeds ===
1. (England) Rajiv Ouseph (second round)
2. (India) Sameer Verma (champion)
3. (Brazil) Ygor Coelho de Oliveira (first round)
4. (Thailand) Suppanyu Avihingsanon (quarterfinals)
5. (Netherlands) Mark Caljouw (second round)
6. (Denmark) Emil Holst (first round)
7. (Denmark) Rasmus Gemke (withdrew)
8. (Malaysia) Lee Zii Jia (first round)

=== Finals ===
Semifinals
(France) Lucas Corvée	14	21	18
(Denmark) Jan Ø. Jørgensen	21	12	21
(Thailand) Kantaphon Wangcharoen	14	21	12
2	(India) Sameer Verma	21	11	21

Final
(Denmark) Jan Ø. Jørgensen	15	13
2	(India) Sameer Verma	21	21

=== Top half ===
==== Section 1 ====
First Round
1	(England) R Ouseph	21	21
(India) A Yelegar	14	13
(France) L Claerbout	21	13	14
(Japan) K Watanabe	14	21	21
6	(Denmark) E Holst	16	21	20
Q4	(France) A Merklé	21	12	22
(France) L Corvée	22	21
Q2	(Japan) R Takeshita	20	11

Second Round
1	(England) R Ouseph	22	17	14
(Japan) K Watanabe	20	21	21
Q4	(France) A Merklé	21	13	20
(France) L Corvée	18	21	22

Quarterfinals
(Japan) K Watanabe	14	21	13
(France) L Corvée	21	19	21

==== Section 2 ====
First Round
4	(Thailand) S Avihingsanon	21	19	21
(Denmark) K Bruun	11	21	19
(Malaysia) Soong J V	24	21
PFQ	(Thailand) A Namkul	22	19
8	(Malaysia) Lee Z J	15	14
(Denmark) J Ø. Jørgensen	21	21
(Finland) E Heino	23	14	10
PFQ	(Malaysia) I Zulkarnain	21	21	21

Second Round
4	(Thailand) S Avihingsanon	22	21
(Malaysia) Soong J V	20	14
(Denmark) J Ø. Jørgensen	21	21
PFQ	(Malaysia) I Zulkarnain	19	18

Quarterfinals
4	(Thailand) S Avihingsanon	13	16
(Denmark) J Ø. Jørgensen	21	21

=== Bottom half ===
==== Section 3 ====
First Round
(Thailand) S Thammasin	8	21	21
(Japan) T Ueda	21	13	19
(Thailand) K Wangcharoen	21	21
PFQ	(Germany) K Schäfer	19	14
(India) S Verma	21	21
(Israel) M Zilberman	11	18
Q3	(India) R. M. V. Gurusaidutt	21	21
3	(Brazil) Y Coelho	16	11

Second Round
(Thailand) S Thammasin	20	21	10^{r}
(Thailand) K Wangcharoen	22	18	11
(India) S Verma	18	14
Q3	(India) R. M. V. Gurusaidutt	21	21

Quarterfinals
(Thailand) K Wangcharoen	21	21
Q3	(India) R. M. V. Gurusaidutt	8	15

==== Section 4 ====
First Round
WC	(Switzerland) C Kirchmayr	11	15
(Japan) K Momota	21	21
PFQ	(Czech Republic) A Mendrek	24	8	15
5	(Netherlands) M Caljouw	22	21	21
Q1	(Germany) L Schänzler	15	14
(Japan) Y Igarashi	21	21
(France) T Rouxel	20	10
2	(India) S Verma	22	21

Second Round
(Japan) K Momota	21	21
5	(Netherlands) M Caljouw	15	16
(Japan) Y Igarashi	21	18	16
2	(India) S Verma	11	21	21

Quarterfinals
(Japan) K Momota	17	16
2	(India) S Verma	21	21

== Women's singles ==
=== Seeds ===
1. (Japan) Sayaka Takahashi (champion)
2. (Japan) Minatsu Mitani (semifinals)
3. (Denmark) Mia Blichfeldt (second round)
4. (Russia) Evgeniya Kosetskaya (semifinals)
5. (Spain) Beatriz Corrales (quarterfinals)
6. (Bulgaria) Linda Zetchiri (quarterfinals)
7. (Denmark) Line Kjærsfeldt (quarterfinals)
8. (Denmark) Natalia Koch Rohde (quarterfinals)

=== Finals ===
Semifinals
1	(Japan) Sayaka Takahashi	21	21
4	(Russia) Evgeniya Kosetskaya	6	18
(Japan) Natsuki Nidaira	w	/	o
2	(Japan) Minatsu Mitani

Final
1	(Japan) Sayaka Takahashi	21	21
(Japan) Natsuki Nidaira	12	18

=== Top half ===
==== Section 1 ====
First Round
1	(Japan) S Takahashi	21	21
PFQ	(India) A Prabhudesai	12	12
(India) S K P Kudaravalli	11	15
(Indonesia) L A Mainaky	21	21
7	(Denmark) L Kjærsfeldt	21	21
Q1	(Indonesia) D Y Indah Sari	14	9
(Russia) N Perminova	18	21	11
(Chinese Taipei) Sung S-y	21	16	21

Second Round
1	(Japan) S Takahashi	21	21
(Indonesia) L A Mainaky	11	11
7	(Denmark) L Kjærsfeldt	21	22
(Chinese Taipei) Sung S-y	18	20

Quarterfinals
1	(Japan) S Takahashi	21	21
7	(Denmark) L Kjærsfeldt	14	13

==== Section 2 ====
First Round
4	(Russia) E Kosetskaya	13	21	21
PFQ	(India) R Mookerjee	21	12	17
Q3	(Chinese Taipei) Chang Y-l	17	17
(England) C Birch	21	21
8	(Denmark) N K Rohde	21	21
(Israel) K Polikarpova	14	11
(Switzerland) S Jaquet	21	20	21
PFQ	(Switzerland) A Huser	13	22	11

Second Round
4	(Russia) E Kosetskaya	21	21
(England) C Birch	17	16
8	(Denmark) N K Rohde	21	11	21
(Switzerland) S Jaquet	19	21	19

Quarterfinals
4	(Russia) E Kosetskaya	18	21	11
8	(Denmark) N K Rohde	21	13	3^{r}

=== Bottom half ===
==== Section 3 ====
First Round
(Bulgaria) M Mitsova	21	21
PFQ	(Switzerland) R Stern	18	13
Q4	(United States) I Zhong	17	14
5	(Spain) B Corrales	21	21
PFQ	(Japan) A Mine	19	18
(Japan) N Nidaira	21	21
Q2	(Netherlands) D Jille	7	11
3	(Denmark) M Blichfeldt	21	21

Second Round
(Bulgaria) M Mitsova	15	21	18
5	(Spain) B Corrales	21	14	21
(Japan) N Nidaira	21	21
3	(Denmark) M Blichfeldt	17	19

Quarterfinals
5	(Spain) B Corrales	8	17
(Japan) N Nidaira	21	21

==== Section 4 ====
First Round
(Denmark) J D Jakobsen	21	21
(India) V R Jakka	19	17
(Germany) L Heim	18	21	11
6	(Bulgaria) L Zetchiri	21	18	21
(India) S U R Chukka	25	21
(Germany) Y Li	23	16
(China) Qi XF	13	7
2	(Japan) M Mitani	21	21

Second Round
(Denmark) J D Jakobsen	15	12
6	(Bulgaria) L Zetchiri	21	21
(India) S U R Chukka	8	13
2	(Japan) M Mitani	21	21

Quarterfinals
6	(Bulgaria) L Zetchiri	17	20
2	(Japan) M Mitani	21	22

== Men's doubles ==
=== Seeds ===
1. (Denmark) Mathias Boe / Carsten Mogensen (champions)
2. (Denmark) Mathias Christiansen / David Daugaard (second round)
3. (England) Marcus Ellis / Chris Langridge (semifinals)
4. (Germany) Josche Zurwonne / Jones Ralfy Jansen (second round)
5. (India) Manu Attri / B. Sumeeth Reddy (withdrew)
6. (England) Peter Briggs / Tom Wolfenden (second round)
7. (Netherlands) Jacco Arends / Ruben Jille (first round)
8. (Germany) Mark Lamsfuß / Marvin Emil Seidel (second round)

=== Finals ===
Semifinals
1	(Denmark) Mathias Boe (Denmark) Carsten Mogensen	21	21
3	(England) Marcus Ellis (England) Chris Langridge	15	14
(Thailand) Maneepong Jongjit (Thailand) Nanthakarn Yordphaisong	25	21	16
(Thailand) Tinn Isriyanet (Thailand) Kittisak Namdash	27	16	21

Final
1	(Denmark) Mathias Boe (Denmark) Carsten Mogensen	21	21
(Thailand) Tinn Isriyanet (Thailand) Kittisak Namdash	15	11

=== Top half ===
==== Section 1 ====
First Round
1	(Denmark) M Boe (Denmark) C Mogensen	21	21
(Malaysia) Shia C K (Malaysia) Tian W G	9	19
PFQ	(India) A Francis (India) K. Nandagopal
Q1	Bye
PFQ	(France) E Adam (France) S Corvée	12	14
(Denmark) M Bay-Smidt (Denmark) F Søgaard	21	21
Q4	(Switzerland) J Scheiwiller (Slovenia) I Utroša	12	13
(Denmark) K Antonsen (Denmark) N Nøhr	21	21

Second Round
1	(Denmark) M Boe (Denmark) C Mogensen	21	21
PFQ	(India) A Francis (India) K. Nandagopal	14	13
(Denmark) M Bay-Smidt (Denmark) F Søgaard	21	13	16
(Denmark) K Antonsen (Denmark) N Nøhr	19	21	21

Quarterfinals
1	(Denmark) M Boe (Denmark) C Mogensen	21	16	21
(Denmark) K Antonsen (Denmark) N Nøhr	15	21	14

==== Section 2 ====
First Round
3	(England) M Ellis (England) C Langridge	21	21
(Germany) D Benz (Germany) A Heinz	17	13
(Thailand) I Apisuk (Thailand) T Viriyangkura	21	21
(Poland) M Bochat (Poland) A Cwalina	17	16
7	(Netherlands) J Arends (Netherlands) R Jille	12	21	18
(England) B Lane (England) S Vendy	21	15	21
(Russia) K Abramov (Russia) A Zinchenko	21	21
PFQ	(France) M Gangloff (France) T Rodrigues	15	11

Second Round
3	(England) M Ellis (England) C Langridge	21	21
(Thailand) I Apisuk (Thailand) T Viriyangkura	11	9
(England) B Lane (England) S Vendy	21	21
(Russia) K Abramov (Russia) A Zinchenko	17	15

Quarterfinals
3	(England) M Ellis (England) C Langridge	15	21	23
(England) B Lane (England) S Vendy	21	13	21

=== Bottom half ===
==== Section 3 ====
First Round
(Thailand) M Jongjit (Thailand) N Yordphaisong	21	21
PFQ	(France) M Briot (France) F Delrue	12	16
(Switzerland) M Bonny (Switzerland) O Schaller	10	21	15
6	(England) P Briggs (England) T Wolfenden	21	17	21
(Chinese Taipei) Po L-w (Chinese Taipei) Yang M-t	17	21	15
(India) Arjun M.R. (India) R Shlok	21	14	21
(India) K Chaudhary (India) B Yadav	8	15
4	(Germany) J R Jansen (Germany) J Zurwonne	21	21

Second Round
(Thailand) M Jongjit (Thailand) N Yordphaisong	21	21
6	(England) P Briggs (England) T Wolfenden	19	16
(India) Arjun M.R. (India) R Shlok	21	21
4	(Germany) J R Jansen (Germany) J Zurwonne	13	17

Quarterfinals
(Thailand) M Jongjit (Thailand) N Yordphaisong	21	21
(India) Arjun M.R. (India) R Shlok	13	18

==== Section 4 ====
First Round
(Malaysia) A Chia (Malaysia) Soh W Y	16	21	21
Q2	(Indonesia) T Gustaman (Bulgaria) S Makarski	21	19	7
Q3	(France) K Lovang (France) W Villeger	8	14
8	(Germany) M Lamsfuß (Germany) M E Seidel	21	21
(Belgium) M Dierickx (Belgium) F Golinski	17	14
(Thailand) T Isriyanet (Thailand) K Namdash	21	21
(Germany) P Käsbauer (Germany) J Pistorius	12	8
2	(Denmark) M Christiansen (Denmark) D Daugaard	21	21

Second Round
(Malaysia) A Chia (Malaysia) Soh W Y	21	21
8	(Germany) M Lamsfuß (Germany) M E Seidel	19	15
(Thailand) T Isriyanet (Thailand) K Namdash	21	16	17
2	(Denmark) M Christiansen (Denmark) D Daugaard	16	21	16^{r}

Quarterfinals
(Malaysia) A Chia (Malaysia) Soh W Y	18	13
(Thailand) T Isriyanet (Thailand) K Namdash	21	21

== Women's doubles ==
=== Seeds ===
1. (Bulgaria) Gabriela Stoeva / Stefani Stoeva (final)
2. (Russia) Olga Morozova / Anastasia Chervyakova (second round)
3. (Denmark) Sara Thygesen / Maiken Fruergaard (first round)
4. (Japan) Misato Aratama / Akane Watanabe (second round)

=== Finals ===
Semifinals
1	(Bulgaria) Gabriela Stoeva (Bulgaria) Stefani Stoeva	21	21
(France) Émilie Lefel (France) Anne Tran	16	12
(Japan) Ayako Sakuramoto (Japan) Yukiko Takahata	21	18	21
(Japan) Nami Matsuyama (Japan) Chiharu Shida	18	21	18

Final
1	(Bulgaria) Gabriela Stoeva (Bulgaria) Stefani Stoeva	21	15	18
(Japan) Ayako Sakuramoto (Japan) Yukiko Takahata	19	21	21

=== Top half ===
==== Section 1 ====
First Round
(Chinese Taipei) Cheng C-y (Chinese Taipei) Sung S-y	19	18
(Denmark) J Finne-Ipsen (Denmark) R Søby	21	21
(Switzerland) C Burkart (Germany) A Horbach	7	8
(Germany) L Efler (Germany) O Konon	21	21
(Czech Republic) A Bášová (Czech Republic) M Fuchsová	21	21
(Italy) S Garino (Italy) L Iversen	13	16

Second Round
1	(Bulgaria) G Stoeva (Bulgaria) S Stoeva	21	21
(Denmark) J Finne-Ipsen (Denmark) R Søby	9	12
(Germany) L Efler (Germany) O Konon	21	15	21
(Czech Republic) A Bášová (Czech Republic) M Fuchsová	13	21	8

Quarterfinals
1	(Bulgaria) G Stoeva (Bulgaria) S Stoeva	21	21
(Germany) L Efler (Germany) O Konon	11	8

==== Section 2 ====
First Round
(France) É Lefel (France) A Tran	21	21
(Switzerland) S Keller (Switzerland) Y Keller	3	14
(Netherlands) D Jille (Netherlands) I van der Aar	13	16
(England) C Birch (England) J Pugh	21	21
(France) A Desmons (France) J Moinard	w	/	o
(Denmark) J D Jakobsen (Denmark) D Søby

Second Round
4	(Japan) M Aratama (Japan) A Watanabe	21	13	17
(France) É Lefel (France) A Tran	14	21	21
(England) C Birch (England) J Pugh	21	21
(France) A Desmons (France) J Moinard	8	10

Quarterfinals
(France) É Lefel (France) A Tran	21	21
(England) C Birch (England) J Pugh	17	13

=== Bottom half ===
==== Section 3 ====
First Round
(Netherlands) S Piek (Netherlands) C Seinen	21	21
(France) S Bauer (France) C Ganci	7	7
(Belgium) L Jaques (Belgium) F Vandenhoucke	21	21
(Germany) E Janssens (Germany) J Petrikowski	13	15
(Thailand) S Amitrapai (Thailand) P Chochuwong	19	21	17
(Germany) I Herttrich (Germany) C Nelte	21	14	21
(Japan) A Sakuramoto (Japan) Y Takahata	21	21
3	(Denmark) M Fruergaard (Denmark) S Thygesen	11	19

Second Round
(Netherlands) S Piek (Netherlands) C Seinen	21	21
(Belgium) L Jaques (Belgium) F Vandenhoucke	10	12
(Germany) I Herttrich (Germany) C Nelte	7	21	12
(Japan) A Sakuramoto (Japan) Y Takahata	21	19	21

Quarterfinals
(Netherlands) S Piek (Netherlands) C Seinen	13	14
(Japan) A Sakuramoto (Japan) Y Takahata	21	21

==== Section 4 ====
First Round
(Switzerland) A Müller (Switzerland) J Stadelmann	8	15
(England) L Smith (England) S Walker	21	21
(France) D Delrue (France) L Palermo	w	/	o
(Switzerland) N Frankhauser (Netherlands) I Tabeling
(Japan) N Matsuyama (Japan) C Shida	w	/	o
(Germany) J Goliszewski (Germany) L Käpplein

Second Round
(England) L Smith (England) S Walker	19	25	21
(France) D Delrue (France) L Palermo	21	23	15
(Japan) N Matsuyama (Japan) C Shida	21	21
2	(Russia) A Chervyakova (Russia) O Morozova	18	12

Quarterfinals
(England) L Smith (England) S Walker	9	19
(Japan) N Matsuyama (Japan) C Shida	21	21

== Mixed doubles ==
=== Seeds ===
1. (Germany) Mark Lamsfuß / Isabel Herttrich (champions)
2. (France) Ronan Labar / Audrey Fontaine (withdrew)
3. (Republic of Ireland) Sam Magee / Chloe Magee (withdrew)
4. (Germany) Marvin Emil Seidel / Linda Efler (quarterfinals)
5. (Netherlands) Jacco Arends / Selena Piek (quarterfinals)
6. (England) Ben Lane / Jessica Pugh (semifinals)
7. (England) Marcus Ellis / Lauren Smith (final)
8. (Denmark) Mikkel Mikkelsen / Mai Surrow (quarterfinals)

=== Finals ===
Semifinals
1	(Germany) Mark Lamsfuß (Germany) Isabel Herttrich	21	22
(Germany) Jones Ralfy Jansen (Germany) Carla Nelte	16	20
7	(England) Marcus Ellis (England) Lauren Smith	21	21
6	(England) Ben Lane (England) Jessica Pugh	8	4

Final
1	(Germany) Mark Lamsfuß (Germany) Isabel Herttrich	22	21
7	(England) Marcus Ellis (England) Lauren Smith	20	19

=== Top half ===
==== Section 1 ====
First Round
1	(Germany) M Lamsfuß (Germany) I Herttrich	21	21
(France) W Villeger (France) S Bauer	16	17
(Netherlands) R Jille (Netherlands) I van der Aar	21	21
(Indonesia) Y F Mainaky (Indonesia) L A Mainaky	14	14
5	(Netherlands) J Arends (Netherlands) S Piek	21	21
(Chinese Taipei) Yang M-t (Chinese Taipei) Sung S-y	16	12
(Denmark) N Nøhr (Denmark) S Thygesen	21	19	21
(Germany) P Käsbauer (Germany) O Konon	16	21	11

Second Round
1	(Germany) M Lamsfuß (Germany) I Herttrich	17	21	25
(Netherlands) R Jille (Netherlands) I van der Aar	21	18	23
5	(Netherlands) J Arends (Netherlands) S Piek	21	9	21
(Denmark) N Nøhr (Denmark) S Thygesen	18	21	15

Quarterfinals
1	(Germany) M Lamsfuß (Germany) I Herttrich	21	21
5	(Netherlands) J Arends (Netherlands) S Piek	8	19

==== Section 2 ====
First Round
PFQ	(Belgium) F Golinski (Belgium) L Jaques	9	10
(Germany) J R Jansen (Germany) C Nelte	21	21
(Thailand) T Isriyanet (Thailand) P Chochuwong	21	21
(Czech Republic) J Bitman (Czech Republic) A Bášová	11	11
8	(Denmark) M Mikkelsen (Denmark) M Surrow	21	19	21
Q4	(Belgium) M Dierickx (Belgium) F Vandenhoucke	15	21	10
(Finland) A Kaisti (Finland) J Nyström	21	13	16
Q2	(Germany) J Zurwonne (Germany) E Janssens	17	21	21

Second Round
(Germany) J R Jansen (Germany) C Nelte	23	21
(Thailand) T Isriyanet (Thailand) P Chochuwong	21	18
8	(Denmark) M Mikkelsen (Denmark) M Surrow	16	21	21
Q2	(Germany) J Zurwonne (Germany) E Janssens	21	19	9

Quarterfinals
(Germany) J R Jansen (Germany) C Nelte	21	21
8	(Denmark) M Mikkelsen (Denmark) M Surrow	19	15

=== Bottom half ===
==== Section 3 ====
First Round
(Germany) A Heinz (Germany) A Horbach	13	21	16
(Chinese Taipei) Chang K-c (Chinese Taipei) Cheng C-y	21	19	21
PFQ	(Denmark) M Bay-Smidt (Denmark) R Søby	17	21
7	(England) M Ellis (England) L Smith	21	23
(France) B Kersaudy (France) L Palermo	21	21
(Switzerland) O Schaller (Switzerland) C Burkart	14	16
(Malaysia) Hoo P R (Malaysia) Peck Y W	18	20
4	(Germany) M E Seidel (Germany) L Efler	21	22

Second Round
(Chinese Taipei) Chang K-c (Chinese Taipei) Cheng C-y	13	21	15
7	(England) M Ellis (England) L Smith	21	9	21
(France) B Kersaudy (France) L Palermo	20	21	12
4	(Germany) M E Seidel (Germany) L Efler	22	17	21

Quarterfinals
7	(England) M Ellis (England) L Smith	21	21
4	(Germany) M E Seidel (Germany) L Efler	15	14

==== Section 4 ====
First Round
(United States) M Fogarty (United States) I Zhong	9	15
Q1	(Bulgaria) S Makarski (Bulgaria) D Dimova	21	21
(France) T Gicquel (France) D Delrue	19	15
6	(England) B Lane (England) J Pugh	21	21
(Malaysia) Chen T J (Malaysia) Cheah Y S	9	19
Q3	(Thailand) K Namdash (Thailand) S Amitrapai	21	21
(Netherlands) R Tabeling (Netherlands) C Seinen	19	21	21
PFQ	(France) G Mittelheisser (France) É Lefel	21	16	9

Second Round
Q1	(Bulgaria) S Makarski (Bulgaria) D Dimova	21	4
6	(England) B Lane (England) J Pugh	23	21
Q3	(Thailand) K Namdash (Thailand) S Amitrapai	21	19	11
(Netherlands) R Tabeling (Netherlands) C Seinen	16	21	21

Quarterfinals
6	(England) B Lane (England) J Pugh	21	22
(Netherlands) R Tabeling (Netherlands) C Seinen	18	20

Preceded by 2018 India Open	BWF World Tour; 2018 BWF season	Succeeded by 2018 German Open
