= 2016 Dutch Open Grand Prix =

Tournament details
- Dates: 11 – 16 October 2016
- Level: Grand Prix
- Total prize money: US$55,000
- Venue: Topsportcentrum
- Location: Almere, Netherlands

Champions
- Men's singles: (Chinese Taipei) Wang Tzu-wei
- Women's singles: (United States) Beiwen Zhang
- Men's doubles: (Chinese Taipei) Lee Jhe-huei (Chinese Taipei) Lee Yang
- Women's doubles: (Australia) Setyana Mapasa (Australia) Gronya Somerville
- Mixed doubles: (Denmark) Mathias Christiansen (Denmark) Sara Thygesen

The 2016 Dutch Open Grand Prix was the 17th badminton tournament of the 2016 BWF Grand Prix Gold and Grand Prix. The tournament was held at Topsportcentrum in Almere, Netherlands, from 11 to 16 October 2016, with a total purse of $55,000.

== Men's singles ==
=== Seeds ===
1. (India) Ajay Jayaram (final)
2. (Chinese Taipei) Wang Tzu-wei (champion)
3. (Spain) Pablo Abián (second round)
4. (Denmark) Emil Holst (semifinals)
5. (Denmark) Anders Antonsen (semifinals)
6. (Estonia) Raul Must (quarterfinals)
7. (Sweden) Henri Hurskainen (quarterfinals)
8. (Brazil) Ygor Coelho de Oliveira (quarterfinals)
9. (France) Lucas Claerbout (second round)
10. (France) Lucas Corvée (third round)
11. (India) Parupalli Kashyap (third round)
12. (Ukraine) Artem Pochtarov (first round)
13. (Czech Republic) Milan Ludík (third round)
14. (France) Thomas Rouxel (third round)
15. (Uganda) Edwin Ekiring (first round)
16. (Norway) Marius Myhre (third round)

=== Finals ===
Quarterfinals
1	(India) Ajay Jayaram	21	21
8	(Brazil) Ygor Coelho de Oliveira	15	18
(Germany) Fabian Roth	18	13
5	(Denmark) Anders Antonsen	21	21
6	(Estonia) Raul Must	23	9
4	(Denmark) Emil Holst	25	21
7	(Sweden) Henri Hurskainen	21	20	5
2	(Chinese Taipei) Wang Tzu-wei	18	22	21

Semifinals
1	(India) Ajay Jayaram	21	13	21
5	(Denmark) Anders Antonsen	18	21	13
4	(Denmark) Emil Holst	10	15
2	(Chinese Taipei) Wang Tzu-wei	21	21

Final
1	(India) Ajay Jayaram	10	21	18
2	(Chinese Taipei) Wang Tzu-wei	21	17	21

=== Top half ===
==== Section 1 ====
First Round
1	(India) A Jayaram	21	21
(Finland) H Aarnio	16	11
(Belgium) R Scheurkogel	21	18	9
(Bulgaria) P Shishov	18	21	21
16	(Norway) M Myhre	21	21
Q6	(England) R Webster	0	1
(Finland) I Heino	22	21
(India) S Verma	20	8

Second Round
1	(India) A Jayaram	21	21
(Bulgaria) P Shishov	7	9
16	(Norway) M Myhre	21	21
(Finland) I Heino	19	18

Third Round
1	(India) A Jayaram	21	21
16	(Norway) M Myhre	6	6

==== Section 2 ====
First Round
8	(Brazil) Y C de Oliveira	21	12	21
(Mexico) J Castillo	15	21	8
(Vietnam) Phạm C C	21	21
(Netherlands) L Ham	14	6
13	(Czech Republic) M Ludík	21	21
(Finland) K Koljonen	14	12
(Germany) K Schäfer	21	18	21
(Netherlands) N Fransman	15	21	17

Second Round
8	(Brazil) Y C de Oliveira	21	21
(Vietnam) Phạm C C	16	13
13	(Czech Republic) M Ludík	18	21	21
(Germany) K Schäfer	21	19	19

Third Round
8	(Brazil) Y C de Oliveira	21	21
13	(Czech Republic) M Ludík	19	17

==== Section 3 ====
First Round
3	(Spain) P Abián	24	21
(Germany) A Roovers	22	16
(Croatia) Z Đurkinjak	21	21
Q5	(Netherlands) T Sibbald	13	8
9	(France) L Claerbout	21	21
Q3	(Scotland) S Ben Boudinar	2	7
(Germany) F Roth	21	21
(England) S Parsons	11	6

Second Round
3	(Spain) P Abián	15	9
(Croatia) Z Đurkinjak	21	21
9	(France) L Claerbout	12	16
(Germany) F Roth	21	21

Third Round
(Croatia) Z Đurkinjak	16	21	20
(Germany) F Roth	21	14	22

==== Section 4 ====
First Round
5	(Denmark) A Antonsen	21	21
Q8	(Netherlands) N Veenstra	8	9
(Sweden) F Burestedt	21	21
(Germany) J Persson	19	17
14	(France) T Rouxel	21	21
(Belgium) S de Langhe	13	14
(Switzerland) K Schafflützel	21	21
Q7	(Czech Republic) F Budzel	17	17

Second Round
5	(Denmark) A Antonsen	21	21
(Sweden) F Burestedt	13	19
14	(France) T Rouxel	w	/	o
(Switzerland) K Schafflützel

Third Round
5	(Denmark) A Antonsen	21	21
14	(France) T Rouxel	9	18

=== Bottom half ===
==== Section 5 ====
First Round
Q4	(Denmark) R Gemke	21	21
(Germany) L Schänzler	10	14
(United States) B Seguin	12	22
11	(India) P Kashyap	21	24
(India) L Sarang	21	21
(Scotland) K Merrilees	12	18
(Finland) E Heino	22	16
6	(Estonia) R Must	24	21

Second Round
Q4	(Denmark) R Gemke	11	21	10
11	(India) P Kashyap	21	7	21
(India) L Sarang	17	17
6	(Estonia) R Must	21	21

Third Round
11	(India) P Kashyap	18	18
6	(Estonia) R Must	21	21

==== Section 6 ====
First Round
(Czech Republic) A Mendrek	21	15	20
(Slovenia) A Roj	19	21	22
Q1	(Netherlands) J Kweekel	21	15	8
10	(France) L Corvée	19	21	21
(England) M Spancer-Smith	17	19
(Sweden) J Nilsson	21	21
(Switzerland) S Manjaly	6	19
4	(Denmark) E Holst	21	21

Second Round
(Slovenia) A Roj	14	11
10	(France) L Corvée	21	21
(Sweden) J Nilsson	11	18
4	(Denmark) E Holst	21	21

Third Round
10	(France) L Corvée	18	19
4	(Denmark) E Holst	21	21

==== Section 7 ====
First Round
(Croatia) F Špoljarec	21	13	16
(Republic of Ireland) J Magee	15	21	21
(Belgium) E Bracke	2
15	(Uganda) E Ekiring	0^{r}
(Bulgaria) A Vlaar	10	10
(Germany) S Hsiao	21	21
(Malaysia) Chiang J S	19	16
7	(Sweden) H Hurskainen	21	21

Second Round
(Republic of Ireland) J Magee	21	22
(Belgium) E Bracke	13	20
(Germany) S Hsiao	9	17
7	(Sweden) H Hurskainen	21	21

Third Round
(Republic of Ireland) J Magee	9	17
7	(Sweden) H Hurskainen	21	21

==== Section 8 ====
First Round
(Netherlands) E Meijs	21	21
Q2	(Netherlands) S M Kee Li	8	5
(England) T Penty	1
12	(Ukraine) A Pochtarov	0^{r}
(Belgium) B Abts	10	11
(Netherlands) M Caljouw	21	21
(Austria) V Vattanirappel	16	0^{r}
2	(Chinese Taipei) Wang T-w	21	15

Second Round
(Netherlands) E Meijs	18	16
(England) T Penty	21	21
(Netherlands) M Caljouw	19	11
2	(Chinese Taipei) Wang T-w	21	21

Third Round
(England) T Penty	10	8
2	(Chinese Taipei) Wang T-w	21	21

== Women's singles ==
=== Seeds ===
1. (United States) Beiwen Zhang (champion)
2. (Chinese Taipei) Hsu Ya-ching (final)
3. (Singapore) Liang Xiaoyu (semifinals)
4. (Spain) Beatriz Corrales (semifinals)
5. (Germany) Olga Konon (second round)
6. (Denmark) Natalia Koch Rohde (quarterfinals)
7. (Ukraine) Marija Ulitina (quarterfinals)
8. (Russia) Natalia Perminova (first round)

=== Finals ===
Semifinals
1	(United States) Beiwen Zhang	21	21
3	(Singapore) Liang Xiaoyu	10	13
4	(Spain) Beatriz Corrales	14	10
2	(Chinese Taipei) Hsu Ya-ching	21	21

Final
1	(United States) Beiwen Zhang	21	21
2	(Chinese Taipei) Hsu Ya-ching	11	19

=== Top half ===
==== Section 1 ====
First Round
1	(United States) B Zhang	21	21
Q2	(Germany) Y Li	12	16
(Switzerland) S Jaquet	21	22
(Denmark) S H Dahl	18	20
8	(Russia) N Perminova	11	11
(Denmark) M Blichfeldt	21	21
(Malaysia) Lee Y Y	20	22	11
(England) C Birch	22	20	21

Second Round
1	(United States) B Zhang	21	21
(Switzerland) S Jaquet	6	17
(Denmark) M Blichfeldt	22	16	21
(England) C Birch	20	21	18

Quarterfinals
1	(United States) BW Zhang	22	21
(Denmark) M Blichfeldt	20	16

==== Section 2 ====
First Round
3	(Singapore) Liang XY	21	21
(Chinese Taipei) Chiang M-h	14	16
(Germany) L Heim	15	9
(Denmark) M Poulsen	21	21
5	(Germany) O Konon	21	21
(Netherlands) G Mahulette	10	18
(Estonia) G Saar	13	21
Q3	(Indonesia) P Siahaya	21	23

Second Round
3	(Singapore) Liang XY	23	21
(Denmark) M Poulsen	21	9
5	(Germany) O Konon	18	21	8
Q3	(Indonesia) P Siahaya	21	19	21

Quarterfinals
3	(Singapore) Liang XY	21	21
Q3	(Indonesia) P Siahaya	17	12

=== Bottom half ===
==== Section 3 ====
First Round
(Finland) A Mikkelä	21	21
(Nigeria) G Gabriel	8	16
(Bulgaria) M Mitsova	21	15	15
7	(Ukraine) M Ulitina	18	21	21
(Czech Republic) K Gavnholt	22	21
(Lithuania) A Stapušaitytė	20	9
(Germany) F Deprez	16	23	14
4	(Spain) B Corrales	21	21	21

Second Round
(Finland) A Mikkelä	18	19
7	(Ukraine) M Ulitina	21	21
(Czech Republic) K Gavnholt	21	25	15
4	(Spain) B Corrales	15	27	21

Quarterfinals
7	(Ukraine) M Ulitina	23	13	13
4	(Spain) B Corrales	21	21	21

==== Section 4 ====
First Round
(Denmark) J Finne-Ipsen	21	21
Q1	(Germany) L Kaminski	13	15
PFQ	(Belgium) F Vandenhoucke	10	4
6	(Denmark) N K Rohde	21	21
(Malaysia) Lee Z Y	18	21	22
(India) R S Gadde	21	13	20
Q4	(Switzerland) A Huser	8	7
2	(Chinese Taipei) Hsu Y-c	21	21

Second Round
(Denmark) J Finne-Ipsen	15	16
6	(Denmark) N K Rohde	21	21
(Malaysia) Lee Z Y	14	15
2	(Chinese Taipei) Hsu Y-c	21	21

Quarterfinals
6	(Denmark) N K Rohde	21	8	15
2	(Chinese Taipei) Hsu Y-c	14	21	21

== Men's doubles ==
=== Seeds ===
1. (India) Manu Attri / B. Sumeeth Reddy (first round)
2. (Chinese Taipei) Lee Jhe-huei / Lee Yang (champion)
3. (India) Pranaav Jerry Chopra / Akshay Dewalkar (first round)
4. (Denmark) Mathias Christiansen / David Daugaard (final)
5. (Belgium) Matijs Dierickx / Freek Golinski (second round)
6. (Germany) Mark Lamsfuß / Marvin Seidel (quarterfinals)
7. (Germany) Raphael Beck / Jones Ralfy Jansen (second round)
8. (England) Peter Briggs / Tom Wolfenden (withdrew)

=== Finals ===
Semifinals
(Netherlands) Jacco Arends (Netherlands) Ruben Jille	14	9
4	(Denmark) Mathias Christiansen (Denmark) David Daugaard	21	21
(Malaysia) Goh Sze Fei (Malaysia) Nur Izzuddin	15	13
2	(Chinese Taipei) Lee Jhe-huei (Chinese Taipei) Lee Yang	21	21

Final
4	(Denmark) Mathias Christiansen (Denmark) David Daugaard	17	17
2	(Chinese Taipei) Lee Jhe-huei (Chinese Taipei) Lee Yang	21	21

=== Top half ===
==== Section 1 ====
First Round
1	(India) M Attri (India) B. S Reddy	19	19
(Netherlands) J Arends (Netherlands) R Jille	21	21
PFQ	(Malaysia) Aaron C T F (Malaysia) Wong W J	21	21
(Czech Republic) F Budzel (Czech Republic) M Ludík	13	11
5	(Belgium) M Dierickx (Belgium) F Golinski	14	21	21
(Germany) D Benz (Germany) A Heinz	21	11	12
(Sweden) R Eidestedt (Sweden) N Ruponen	21	21
(Finland) H Aarnio (Finland) I Heino	6	10

Second Round
(Netherlands) J Arends (Netherlands) R Jille	21	21
PFQ	(Malaysia) Aaron C T F (Malaysia) Wong W J	14	18
5	(Belgium) M Dierickx (Belgium) F Golinski	12	21
(Sweden) R Eidestedt (Sweden) N Ruponen	21	23

Quarterfinals
(Netherlands) J Arends (Netherlands) R Jille	21	22
(Sweden) R Eidestedt (Sweden) N Ruponen	17	20

==== Section 2 ====
First Round
4	(Denmark) M Christiansen (Denmark) D Daugaard	w	/	o
(Ukraine) G Natarov (Ukraine) A Pochtarov
(Republic of Ireland) J Magee (Republic of Ireland) S Magee	18	21	21
(Austria) D Stipsits (Austria) R Zirnwald	21	18	13
7	(Germany) R Beck (Germany) J R Jansen	21	21
Q3	(Germany) P Lang (Germany) T Legleitner	19	9
(Bulgaria) P Shishov (Bulgaria) A Vlaar	8	11
Q4	(Denmark) F Colberg (Denmark) R Fladberd	21	21

Second Round
4	(Denmark) M Christiansen (Denmark) D Daugaard	21	21
(Republic of Ireland) J Magee (Republic of Ireland) S Magee	13	10
7	(Germany) R Beck (Germany) J R Jansen	21	6	20
Q4	(Denmark) F Colberg (Denmark) R Fladberd	18	21	22

Quarterfinals
4	(Denmark) M Christiansen (Denmark) D Daugaard	22	21	21
Q4	(Denmark) F Colberg (Denmark) R Fladberd	24	14	12

=== Bottom half ===
==== Section 3 ====
First Round
(Croatia) Z Đurkinjak (Croatia) F Špoljarec	24	21	19
(Mexico) J Castillo (Germany) J Persson	26	16	21
(Scotland) A Hall (England) P Mills	13	21	21
PFQ	(Denmark) K Antonsen (Denmark) F Søgaard	21	18	23
Q2	(Germany) L Konder (Germany) T Mund	5	11
(Malaysia) Goh S F (Malaysia) N Izzuddin	21	21
(Germany) B Geiss (Germany) F Holzer	21	15	22
3	(India) P J Chopra (India) A Dewalkar	17	21	20

Second Round
(Mexico) J Castillo (Germany) J Persson	12	12
PFQ	(Denmark) K Antonsen (Denmark) F Søgaard	21	21
(Malaysia) Goh S F (Malaysia) N Izzuddin	21	21
(Germany) B Geiss (Germany) F Holzer	14	10

Quarterfinals
PFQ	(Denmark) K Antonsen (Denmark) F Søgaard	12	16
(Malaysia) Goh S F (Malaysia) N Izzuddin	21	21

==== Section 4 ====
First Round
(France) B Kersaudy (France) J Maio	21	12	21
(Germany) R Domke (Germany) J Pistorius	11	21	17
(Netherlands) J Maas (Netherlands) R Tabeling	21	19	12
6	(Germany) M Lamsfuß (Germany) M Seidel	16	21	21
(Scotland) M Campbell (Scotland) P Machugh	21	21
PFQ	(Netherlands) S M Kee Li (Netherlands) T van der Lecq	5	8
Q1	BYE
2	(Chinese Taipei) Lee J-h (Chinese Taipei) Lee Y

Second Round
(France) B Kersaudy (France) J Maio	17	13
6	(Germany) M Lamsfuß (Germany) M Seidel	21	21
(Scotland) M Campbell (Scotland) P Machugh	19	10
2	(Chinese Taipei) Lee J-h (Chinese Taipei) Lee Y	21	21

Quarterfinals
6	(Germany) M Lamsfuß (Germany) M Seidel	18	21	15
2	(Chinese Taipei) Lee J-h (Chinese Taipei) Lee Y	21	19	21

== Women's doubles ==
=== Seeds ===
1. (Netherlands) Eefje Muskens / Selena Piek (withdrew)
2. (Bulgaria) Gabriela Stoeva / Stefani Stoeva (final)
3. (Australia) Setyana Mapasa / Gronya Somerville (champion)
4. (Denmark) Maiken Fruergaard / Sara Thygesen (quarterfinals)

=== Finals ===
Semifinals
(Malaysia) Amelia Alicia Anscelly (Malaysia) Teoh Mei Xing	9	12
3	(Australia) Setyana Mapasa (Australia) Gronya Somerville	21	21
(Malaysia) Goh Yea Ching (Malaysia) Lim Chiew Sien	14	20
2	(Bulgaria) Gabriela Stoeva (Bulgaria) Stefani Stoeva	21	22

Final
3	(Australia) Setyana Mapasa (Australia) Gronya Somerville	17	21	21
2	(Bulgaria) Gabriela Stoeva (Bulgaria) Stefani Stoeva	21	17	16

=== Top half ===
==== Section 1 ====
First Round
1	(Netherlands) E Muskens (Netherlands) S Piek
BYE
(Germany) L Kaminski (Germany) H Pohl	18	11
(Malaysia) A A Anscelly (Malaysia) Teoh M X	21	21
(Germany) I Herttrich (Germany) C Nelte	16	20
(England) C Birch (England) S Walker	21	22
(Finland) M Lindholm (Finland) J Nyström	14	21	21
(Germany) E Janssens (Germany) J Karnott	21	18	19

Second Round
1	(Netherlands) E Muskens (Netherlands) S Piek
(Malaysia) A A Anscelly (Malaysia) Teoh M X	w	/	o
(England) C Birch (England) S Walker	21	21
(Finland) M Lindholm (Finland) J Nyström	14	13

Quarterfinals
(Malaysia) A A Anscelly (Malaysia) Teoh M X	21	21
(England) C Birch (England) S Walker	13	17

==== Section 2 ====
First Round
3	(Australia) S Mapasa (Australia) G Somerville	21	21
(Bulgaria) M Mitsova (Bulgaria) P Nedelcheva	17	9
(Chinese Taipei) Chiang M-h (Chinese Taipei) Hsu Y-c	21	21
(Germany) A Horbach (Germany) T Wurm	17	16
(Germany) L Efler (Germany) B Michels	21	21
(Netherlands) D Jille (Netherlands) I van der Aar	16	11
(France) L Baumann (France) A Fontaine	19	20
(Denmark) J Finne-Ipsen (Denmark) R Søby Hansen	21	22

Second Round
3	(Australia) S Mapasa (Australia) G Somerville	21	21
(Chinese Taipei) Chiang M-h (Chinese Taipei) Hsu Y-c	12	17
(Germany) L Efler (Germany) B Michels	20	15
(Denmark) J Finne-Ipsen (Denmark) R Søby Hansen	22	21

Quarterfinals
3	(Australia) S Mapasa (Australia) G Somerville	21	21
(Denmark) J Finne-Ipsen (Denmark) R Søby Hansen	17	8

=== Bottom half ===
==== Section 3 ====
First Round
(Switzerland) C Burkart (Switzerland) S Jaquet	12	19
(Malaysia) Goh Y C (Malaysia) Lim C S	21	21
(Switzerland) N Fankhauser (Malaysia) S Saniru	21	21
(Netherlands) S Barning (Netherlands) I Vaessen	12	16
(Germany) J Goliszewski (Germany) L Kaepplein	15	15
(England) S Brown (England) L Smith	21	21
(India) J Meghana (India) P S Ram	10	9
4	(Denmark) M Fruergaard (Denmark) S Thygesen	21	21

Second Round
(Malaysia) Goh Y C (Malaysia) Lim C S	22	21
(Switzerland) N Fankhauser (Malaysia) S Saniru	20	15
(England) S Brown (England) L Smith	7	22	17
4	(Denmark) M Fruergaard (Denmark) S Thygesen	21	20	21

Quarterfinals
(Malaysia) Goh Y C (Malaysia) Lim C S	21	15	24
4	(Denmark) M Fruergaard (Denmark) S Thygesen	13	21	22

==== Section 4 ====
First Round
(Netherlands) M Baan (Netherlands) A Tirtosentono	14	21	17
(Germany) B Bellenberg (Germany) F Volkmann	21	10	21
(Netherlands) C Seinen (Netherlands) I Tabeling	19	21	21
(France) E Lefel (France) A Tran	21	15	23
(Belgium) L Jaques (Belgium) F Vandenhoucke	7	16
(Sweden) C Nistad (Sweden) E Wengberg	21	21
BYE
2	(Bulgaria) G Stoeva (Bulgaria) S Stoeva

Second Round
(Germany) B Bellenberg (Germany) F Volkmann	14	20
(France) E Lefel (France) A Tran	21	22
(Sweden) C Nistad (Sweden) E Wengberg	13	14
2	(Bulgaria) G Stoeva (Bulgaria) S Stoeva	21	21

Quarterfinals
(France) E Lefel (France) A Tran	3	14
2	(Bulgaria) G Stoeva (Bulgaria) S Stoeva	21	21

== Mixed doubles ==
=== Seeds ===
1. (Netherlands) Jacco Arends / Selena Piek (withdrew)
2. (Republic of Ireland) Sam Magee / Chloe Magee (first round)
3. (France) Bastian Kersaudy / Lea Palermo (withdrew)
4. (India) Pranaav Jerry Chopra / N. Sikki Reddy (semifinals)
5. (Denmark) Mathias Christiansen / Sara Thygesen (champion)
6. (Germany) Mark Lamsfuß / Isabel Herttrich (second round)
7. (Germany) Marvin Seidel / Birgit Michels (semifinals)
8. (Germany) Jones Ralfy Jansen / Franziska Volkmann (first round)

=== Finals ===
Semifinals
5	(Denmark) Mathias Christiansen (Denmark) Sara Thygesen	21	21
7	(Germany) Marvin Seidel (Germany) Birgit Michels	15	15
4	(India) Pranaav Jerry Chopra (India) N. Sikki Reddy	19	16
(Denmark) Søren Gravholt (Denmark) Maiken Fruergaard	21	21

Final
5	(Denmark) Mathias Christiansen (Denmark) Sara Thygesen	21	20	21
(Denmark) Søren Gravholt (Denmark) Maiken Fruergaard	18	22	16

=== Top half ===
==== Section 1 ====
First Round
PFQ	(Germany) A Trisnanto (Indonesia) P Siahaya	19	16
(Germany) R Beck (Germany) C Nelte	21	21
(France) J Maio (France) L Baumann	17	17
(Germany) J Pistorius (Germany) B Bellenberg	21	21
5	(Denmark) M Christiansen (Denmark) S Thygesen	21	21
(Netherlands) R Tabeling (Netherlands) C Seinen	16	12
(Germany) B Geiss (Germany) E Janssens
Q2	BYE

Second Round
(Germany) R Beck (Germany) C Nelte	21	21
(Germany) J Pistorius (Germany) B Bellenberg	9	16
5	(Denmark) M Christiansen (Denmark) S Thygesen	21	21
(Germany) B Geiss (Germany) E Janssens	14	16

Quarterfinals
(Germany) R Beck (Germany) C Nelte	14	23
5	(Denmark) M Christiansen (Denmark) S Thygesen	21	25

==== Section 2 ====
First Round
PFQ	(Malaysia) M R S Mohd Ridzuan Shah (Malaysia) S Saniru	21	18	17
PFQ	(Netherlands) J Maas (Netherlands) I van der Aar	16	21	21
(Germany) D Benz (Germany) T Wurm	11	17
(India) B. S Reddy (India) M Jakkampudi	21	21
7	(Germany) M Seidel (Germany) B Michels	25	17	21
(Chinese Taipei) Lee Y (Chinese Taipei) Hsu Y-c	23	21	18
(Finland) H Aarnio (Finland) J Nyström	12	21	16
(Germany) R Domke (Germany) J Karnott	21	19	21

Second Round
PFQ	(Netherlands) J Maas (Netherlands) I van der Aar	16	18
(India) B. S Reddy (India) M Jakkampudi	21	21
7	(Germany) M Seidel (Germany) B Michels	21	21
(Germany) R Domke (Germany) J Karnott	17	12

Quarterfinals
(India) B. S Reddy (India) M Jakkampudi	7	10
7	(Germany) M Seidel (Germany) B Michels	21	21

=== Bottom half ===
==== Section 3 ====
First Round
(Denmark) K Antonsen (Australia) G Somerville	21	21
(Germany) F Holzer (Germany) L Kaepplein	10	19
(France) R Labar (France) A Fontaine	21	21
8	(Germany) J R Jansen (Germany) F Volkmann	17	12
(France) J Corvée (France) A Tran
Q3	BYE
Q4	(Netherlands) T van der Lecq (Netherlands) A Tirtosentono	5	16
4	(India) P J Chopra (India) N. S Reddy	21	21

Second Round
(Denmark) K Antonsen (Australia) G Somerville	14	21	11
(France) R Labar (France) A Fontaine	21	15	21
(France) J Corvée (France) A Tran	16	17
4	(India) P J Chopra (India) N. S Reddy	21	21

Quarterfinals
(France) R Labar (France) A Fontaine	10	21	17
4	(India) P J Chopra (India) N. S Reddy	21	10	21

==== Section 4 ====
First Round
Q1	(Belgium) E Bracke (Belgium) L Jaques	8	9
(Netherlands) R Jille (Netherlands) I Tabeling	21	21
PFQ	(Czech Republic) F Budzel (Czech Republic) K Gavnholt	15	14
6	(Germany) M Lamsfuß (Germany) I Herttrich	21	21
PFQ	(Germany) A Heinz (Germany) A Horbach	25	24
(Switzerland) O Schaller (Switzerland) C Burkart	23	22
(Denmark) S Gravholt (Denmark) M Fruergaard	21	21
2	(Republic of Ireland) S Magee (Republic of Ireland) C Magee	19	13

Second Round
(Netherlands) R Jille (Netherlands) I Tabeling	24	12	21
6	(Germany) M Lamsfuß (Germany) I Herttrich	22	21	14
PFQ	(Germany) A Heinz (Germany) A Horbach	10	9
(Denmark) S Gravholt (Denmark) M Fruergaard	21	21

Quarterfinals
(Netherlands) R Jille (Netherlands) I Tabeling	25	12
(Denmark) S Gravholt (Denmark) M Fruergaard	27	21

Preceded by 2016 Chinese Taipei Masters	BWF Grand Prix and Grand Prix Gold; 2016 BWF Season	Succeeded by 2016 Bitburger Open Grand Prix Gold
