= 2016 BWF International Challenge =

The 2016 BWF International Challenge was the tenth season of the BWF International Challenge.

== Schedule ==
Below is the schedule released by Badminton World Federation:

Tour	Official title	Venue	City	Date		Prize money USD	Report
Tour	Official title	Venue	City	Start	Finish	Prize money USD	Report
1	China International Challenge 2016	Agile Stadium of Lingshui Culture and Sports Square	Lingshui	January 19	January 24	50,000	
2	(Sweden) Swedish Masters 2016	Fyrishov	Uppsala	January 21	January 24	17,500	
3	(Austria) Austrian Open 2016		Vienna	February 24	February 27	17,500	
4	31st Brazil International badminton Cup 2016		São Paulo	March 9	March 13	17,500	
5	(Poland) Yonex Polish Open 2016		Warsaw	March 23	March 26	17,500	
6	(France) Orléans International Challenge 2016		Orléans	March 31	April 4	17,500	
7	(Finland) Finnish Open 2016		Vantaa	April 7	April 10	17,500	
8	XXI Peru International 2016		Lima	April 14	April 17	17,500	
9	(French Polynesia) Tahiti Phone International Challenge 2016		Papeete	April 21	April 24	17,500	
11	(Thailand) Smiling Fish International Challenge 2016						
12	Ciputra Hanoi - Yonex Sunrise Vietnam International Challenge 2016						
13	(Spain) XXIX Spanish International 2016						
14	(Russia) White Nights 2016						
15	(Nigeria) Lagos International 2016						
16	(Belgium) Yonex Belgian International 2016						
17	(Czech Republic) Czech International 2016						
18	(Hungary) 41st YONEX Hungarian International 2016						
19	Bahrain International Challenge 2016						
20	(Indonesia) USM Victor International Challenge 2016						
21	Celcom Axiata Malaysia International Challenge 2016						
22	(Wales) YONEX Welsh International 2016	Sport Wales National Centre	Wales	Nov 30	Dec 3		Report
23	TATA India International Challenge 2016						
24	Yonex-Sunrise Bangladesh International Challenge 2016						
25	(Republic of Ireland) Irish Open 2016						
26	(Italy) XVI Italian International						
27	(United States) 2016 YONEX/K & D Graphics International Challenge						

== Cancelled tournaments ==
Tour	Official title	Venue	City	Date		Prize money USD	Report
Tour	Official title	Venue	City	Start	Finish	Prize money USD	Report
10	26th Iran Fajr International Challenge 2016						

There is do not have a time table at 2016 BWF Season

== Results ==
=== Winners ===
Tour	Men's singles	Women's singles	Men's doubles	Women's doubles	Mixed doubles
China	(China) Lin Guipu	(China) Hui Xirui	(China) Wang Yilyu (China) Zhang Wen	(China) Chen Qingchen (China) Jia Yifan	(China) Wang Sijie (China) Chen Lu
(Sweden) Swedish Masters	(Denmark) Anders Antonsen	(Germany) Karin Schnaase	(Denmark) Mathias Christiansen (Denmark) David Daugaard	(Denmark) Maiken Fruergaard (Denmark) Sara Thygesen	(Poland) Robert Mateusiak (Poland) Nadiezda Zieba
Austria	(Denmark) Anders Antonsen	(China) Xu Wei	(England) Marcus Ellis (England) Chris Langridge	(Russia) Ekaterina Bolotova (Russia) Evgeniya Kosetskaya	(Denmark) Mathias Christiansen (Denmark) Lena Grebak
Brazil	(Portugal) Pedro Martins	(Turkey) Neslihan Yigit	(Poland) Adam Cwalina (Poland) Przemyslaw Wacha	(Japan) Chisato Hoshi (Japan) Naru Shinoya	(Canada) Toby Ng (Canada) Alex Bruce
Poland	(France) Thomas Rouxel	(France) Delphine Lansac	(Indonesia) Hardianto (Indonesia) Kenas Adi Haryanto	(Thailand) Puttita Supajirakul (Thailand) Sapsiree Taerattanachai	(Poland) Robert Mateusiak (Poland) Nadiezda Zieba
France	(Denmark) Rasmus Fladberg	(Malaysia) Goh Jin Wei	(Sweden) Richard Eidestedt (Sweden) Nico Ruponen	(France) Delphine Delrue (France) Lea Palermo	(Denmark) Mathias Christiansen (Denmark) Lena Grebak
Finland	(Vietnam) Nguyen Tien Minh	(Japan) Rira Kawashima	(Denmark) Mathias Christiansen (Denmark) David Daugaard	(Japan) Misato Aratama (Japan) Akane Watanabe	(Denmark) Mathias Christiansen (Denmark) Lena Grebak
Peru	(Brazil) Ygor Coelho De Oliveira	(Germany) Karin Schnaase	(Poland) Adam Cwalina (Poland) Przemyslaw Wacha	(Germany) Johanna Goliszewski (Germany) Carla Nelte	(Russia) Vitalij Durkin (Russia) Nina Vislova
(French Polynesia) Tahiti	(Italy) Indra Bagus Ade Chandra	(Japan) Moe Araki	(Poland) Adam Cwalina (Poland) Przemyslaw Wacha	(Japan) Akane Araki (Japan) Ayaka Kawasaki	(Russia) Vitalij Durkin (Russia) Nina Vislova
Iran	N/A	N/A	N/A	N/A	N/A
Thailand	(Indonesia) Krishna Adi Nugraha	(Indonesia) Dinar Dyah Ayustine	(Singapore) Danny Bawa Chrisnanta (Singapore) Hendra Wijaya	(Indonesia) Suci Rizky Andini (Indonesia) Yulfira Barkah	(Singapore) Terry Hee Yong Kai (Singapore) Tan Wei Han
Vietnam	(Vietnam) Nguyen Tien Minh	(Vietnam) Vu Thi Trang	(Malaysia) Ong Yew Sin (Malaysia) Teo Ee Yi	(Japan) Yuki Fukushima (Japan) Chiharu Shida	(Japan) Yuta Watanabe (Japan) Arisa Higashino
Spain	(Denmark) Anders Antonsen	(Japan) Ayumi Mine	(Denmark) Mathias Christiansen (Denmark) David Daugaard	(Japan) Yuki Fukushima (Japan) Chiharu Shida	(England) Ben Lane (England) Jessica Pugh
Russia	(France) Lucas Claerbout	(Turkey) Neslihan Yigit	(Germany) Jones Ralfy Jansen (Germany) Josche Zurwonne	(Japan) Asumi Kugo (Japan) Megumi Yokoyama	(Germany) Michael Fuchs (Germany) Birgit Michels
Nigeria	N/A	N/A	N/A	N/A	N/A
Belgium	(France) Lucas Corvee	(Malaysia) Sonia Cheah Su Ya	(Chinese Taipei) Lu Ching-yao (Chinese Taipei) Yang Po-han	(England) Chloe Birch (England) Lauren Smith	(France) Ronan Labar (France) Audrey Fontaine
Czech Republic	(Germany) Fabian Roth	(Denmark) Natalia Koch Rohde	(Chinese Taipei) Lu Ching-yao (Chinese Taipei) Yang Po-han	(England) Lauren Smith (England) Sarah Walker	(Denmark) Mathias Bay-Smidt (Denmark) Alexandra Boje
Hungary	(Denmark) Kim Bruun	(Malaysia) Yap Rui Chen	(Singapore) Danny Bawa Chrisnanta (Singapore) Hendra Wijaya	(Bulgaria) Mariya Mitsova (Bulgaria) Petya Nedelcheva	(Singapore) Terry Hee Yong Kai (Singapore) Tan Wei Han
Bahrain	(India) Pratul Joshi	(Indonesia) Sri Fatmawati	(Russia) Evgenij Dremin (Russia) Denis Grachev	(Bahrain) Tanisha Crasto (Indonesia) Aprilsasi Putri Lejarsar Variella	(Russia) Evgenij Dremin (Russia) Evgenia Dimova
Indonesia	(Indonesia) Shesar Hiren Rhustavito	(Indonesia) Fitriani	(Malaysia) Chooi Kah Ming (Malaysia) Low Juan Shen	(Malaysia) Lim Yin Loo (Malaysia) Yap Cheng Wen	(Indonesia) Yantoni Edy Saputra (Indonesia) Marsheilla Gischa Islami
Malaysia	(Indonesia) Panji Ahmad Maulana	(Japan) Sayaka Takahashi	(Malaysia) Chooi Kah Ming (Malaysia) Low Juan Shen	(Malaysia) Chow Mei Kuan (Malaysia) Lee Meng Yean	(Malaysia) Goh Soon Huat (Malaysia) Shevon Jamie Lai
Wales	(Spain) Pablo Abian	(Spain) Beatriz Corrales	(Chinese Taipei) Liao Min-chun (Chinese Taipei) Su Cheng-heng	(Russia) Anastasia Chervyakova (Russia) Olga Morozova	(Poland) Robert Mateusiak (Poland) Nadieżda Zięba
India	(Indonesia) Enzi Shafira	(Malaysia) Sonia Cheah Su Ya	(India) Satwiksairaj Rankireddy (India) Chirag Shetty	(Indonesia) Mychelle Crhystine Bandaso (Indonesia) Serena Kani	(Indonesia) Fachriza Abimanyu (Indonesia) Bunga Fitriani Romadhini
Bangladesh	(India) Abhishek Yelegar	(Vietnam) Vũ Thị Trang	(India) Satwiksairaj Rankireddy (India) Chirag Shetty	(Vietnam) Nguyễn Thị Sen (Vietnam) Vũ Thị Trang	(India) Satwiksairaj Rankireddy (India) K. Maneesha
(Republic of Ireland) Irish Open	(Germany) Fabian Roth	(Denmark) Line Kjærsfeldt	(Germany) Jones Ralfy Jansen (Germany) Josche Zurwonne	(France) Emilie Lefel (France) Anne Tran	(Denmark) Mathias Christiansen (Denmark) Sara Thygesen
Italy	(Sweden) Henri Hurskainen	(Switzerland) Sabrina Jaquet	(Germany) Jones Ralfy Jansen (Germany) Josche Zurwonne	(Russia) Anastasia Chervyakova (Russia) Olga Morozova	(France) Jordan Corvee (France) Anne Tran
United States	(Italy) Indra Bagus Ade Chandra	(Italy) Jeannine Cicognini	(Indonesia) David Yedija Pohan (Indonesia) Ricky Alverino Sidharta	(Mexico) Nicole Marquez (Mexico) Adelina Quinones	(Indonesia) David Yedija Pohan (Indonesia) Jenna Gozali

=== Performance by countries ===
Tabulated below are the International Challenge based on countries. Only countries who have won a title are listed:

S.no	Team	CHN	SWE	AUT	BRA	POL	FRA	FIN	PER	TAH	IRI	THA	VIE	ESP	RUS	NGR	BEL	CZE	HUN	BAH	INA	MAS	WAL	IND	BAN	IRL	ITA	USA	Total
1	Denmark		3	2			2	1			N/A			2		N/A		2	1							2			15
2	Indonesia					1					N/A	3				N/A				1.5	3	1		3				2	14.5
3	Japan				1			2		2	N/A		2	2	1	N/A						1							11
4	Malaysia						1				N/A		1			N/A	1		1		2	3		1					10
5	Germany		1						2		N/A				2	N/A		1								2	1		9
6	France					2	1				N/A				1	N/A	2									1	1		8
7	Poland		1		1	1		1	1	1	N/A					N/A							1						7
7	Russia			1					1	1	N/A					N/A				2			1				1		7
9	China	5		1							N/A					N/A													6
10	Vietnam							1			N/A		2			N/A									2				5
10	India										N/A					N/A				1				1	3				5
12	England			1							N/A			1		N/A	1	1											4
12	Singapore										N/A	2				N/A			2										4
14	Italy									1	"N/A"					"N/A"												2	3
14	Chinese Taipei										N/A					N/A	1	1					1						3
16	Turkey				1						N/A				1	N/A													2
16	Spain										N/A					N/A							2						2
18	Portugal				1						N/A					N/A													1
18	Canada				1						N/A					N/A													1
18	Thailand					1					N/A					N/A													1
18	Sweden						1				N/A					N/A													1
18	Brazil								1		N/A					N/A													1
18	Switzerland										N/A					N/A											1		1
18	Bulgaria										N/A					N/A			1										1
25	Bahrain										N/A					N/A				0.5									0.5
