= Julien Maio =

French badminton player (born 1994)

Personal information
- Born: 6 May 1994 (age 32) Strasbourg, France
- Years active: Right
- Height: 1.77 m (5 ft 10 in)

Sport
- Country: France
- Sport: Badminton

Men's & mixed doubles
- Highest ranking: 36 (MD with William Villeger, 3 November 2026); 45 (MD with Éloi Adam, 22 February 2018); 31 (XD with Léa Palermo, 27 October 2026)
- Current ranking: 37 (MD with William Villeger); 34 (XD with Léa Palermo) (10 November 2026)
- BWF profile
Medal record
Men's badminton
Representing France
Thomas Cup
Silver medal – second place	2026 Horsens	Men's team
European Championships
Bronze medal – third place	2025 Horsens	Mixed doubles
European Men's Team Championships
Silver medal – second place	2016 Kazan	Men's team
Silver medal – second place	2024 Łódź	Men's team
Bronze medal – third place	2018 Kazan	Men's team
Bronze medal – third place	2020 Liévin	Men's team
European Mixed Team Championships
Silver medal – second place	2021 Vantaa	Mixed team
Silver medal – second place	2025 Baku	Mixed team
European Junior Championships
Silver medal – second place	2013 Ankara	Mixed team
Bronze medal – third place	2013 Ankara	Boys' doubles

Julien Maio (born 6 May 1994) is a French badminton player. He started playing badminton at CEBA club in Strasbourg. He won the bronze medal in the mixed doubles at the 2025 European Championships. In the juniors, Maio won the bronze medal at the 2013 European Junior Championships in the boys' doubles, and a silver in the mixed team event. He claimed his first international title at the 2015 Eurasia Bulgaria International in the men's doubles partnered with Jordan Corvée. Maio was three times National champions winning in 2017–2019. He was part of the French team that made history in badminton by secured the silver medal at the Thomas Cup.

== Achievements ==
=== European Championships ===
Mixed doubles
Year	Venue	Partner	Opponent	Score	Result
2025	Forum; Horsens, Denmark	(France) Léa Palermo	(Denmark) Jesper Toft (Denmark) Amalie Magelund	14–21, 13–21	Bronze

=== European Junior Championships ===
Boys' doubles
Year	Venue	Partner	Opponent	Score	Result
2013	ASKI Sport Hall; Ankara, Turkey	(France) Antoine Lodiot	(Denmark) Kasper Antonsen (Denmark) Oliver Babic	25–27, 21–18, 17–21	Bronze

=== BWF World Tour (1 runner-up) ===
The BWF World Tour, which was announced on 19 March 2017 and implemented in 2018, is a series of elite badminton tournaments sanctioned by the Badminton World Federation (BWF). The BWF World Tours are divided into levels of World Tour Finals, Super 1000, Super 750, Super 500, Super 300, and the BWF Tour Super 100.

Men's doubles
Year	Tournament	Level	Partner	Opponent	Score	Result	Ref.
2026	German Open	Super 300	(France) William Villeger	(China) Chen Boyang (China) Liu Yi	21–17, 15–21, 12–21	(silver) Runner-up	

=== BWF International Challenge/Series (11 titles, 5 runners-up) ===
Men's doubles
Year	Tournament	Partner	Opponent	Score	Result
2015	Eurasia Bulgaria International	(France) Jordan Corvée	(Bulgaria) Daniel Nikolov (Bulgaria) Ivan Rusev	18–21, 25–23, 21–17	(gold) Winner
2016	White Nights	(France) Bastian Kersaudy	(Germany) Jones Ralfy Jansen (Germany) Josche Zurwonne	15–21, 14–21	(silver) Runner-up
2017	Estonian International	(France) Bastian Kersaudy	(Finland) Henri Aarnio (Finland) Iikka Heino	21–13, 21–14	(gold) Winner
2019	Swedish Open	(France) Bastian Kersaudy	(Denmark) Mathias Bay-Smidt (Denmark) Lasse Mølhede	12–21, 15–21	(silver) Runner-up
2019	Hellas Open	(France) Éloi Adam	(New Zealand) Oliver Leydon-Davis (New Zealand) Abhinav Manota	21–18, 21–18	(gold) Winner
2019	Bulgarian Open	(France) Éloi Adam	(New Zealand) Oliver Leydon-Davis (New Zealand) Abhinav Manota	10–21, 21–16, 21–12	(gold) Winner
2023	Estonian International	(France) William Villeger	(Japan) Shuntaro Mezaki (Japan) Haruya Nishida	19–21, 14–21	(silver) Runner-up
2023	Portugal International	(France) William Villeger	(Japan) Kazuhiro Ichikawa (Japan) Daiki Umayahara	16–21, 21–15, 21–13	(gold) Winner
2024	Réunion Open	(France) William Villeger	(India) Prakash Raj (India) Gouse Shaik	21–9, 21–14	(gold) Winner
2024	Mauritius International	(France) William Villeger	(Germany) Malik Bourakkadi (Germany) Marvin Datko	18–21, 21–10, 21–6	(gold) Winner
2024	Belgian International	(France) William Villeger	(Netherlands) Ties van der Lecq (Netherlands) Brian Wassink	17–21, 20–22	(silver) Runner-up
2024	Turkey International	(France) William Villeger	(France) Éloi Adam (France) Léo Rossi	21–15, 17–21, 21–13	(gold) Winner
2026	Irish Open	(France) William Villeger	(South Korea) Jin Sung-ik (South Korea) Lee Hyeong-woo	20–22, 21–11, 17–21	(silver) Runner-up

Mixed doubles
Year	Tournament	Partner	Opponent	Score	Result
2024	Réunion Open	(France) Léa Palermo	(France) William Villeger (France) Flavie Vallet	23–21, 21–12	(gold) Winner
2024	Mauritius International	(France) Léa Palermo	(France) William Villeger (France) Flavie Vallet	21–11, 21–14	(gold) Winner
2024	Turkey International	(France) Léa Palermo	(India) Rohan Kapoor (India) Gadde Ruthvika Shivani	21–15, 21–13	(gold) Winner

BWF International Challenge tournament
BWF International Series tournament
BWF Future Series tournament
