= 2013 European Junior Badminton Championships =

Tournament details
- Dates: 22 – 31 March 2013
- Venue: ASKI Sport Hall
- Location: Ankara, Turkey

The 2013 European Junior Badminton Championships were held at the ASKI Sport Hall in Ankara, Turkey, between 22-31 March 2013.

== Venue ==
This Tournament was held at the ASKI Sport Hall in İvedik, Ankara, Turkey.

== Medalists ==
Event	Gold	Silver	Bronze
Boys' singles	(Germany) Fabian Roth	(Netherlands) Mark Caljouw	(Austria) Matthias Almer
Boys' singles	(Germany) Fabian Roth	(Netherlands) Mark Caljouw	(England) Rhys Walker
Girls' singles	(Bulgaria) Stefani Stoeva	(Denmark) Line Kjærsfeldt	(Turkey) Neslihan Yiğit
Girls' singles	(Bulgaria) Stefani Stoeva	(Denmark) Line Kjærsfeldt	(France) Delphine Lansac
Boys' doubles	(Denmark) Kasper Antonsen (Denmark) Oliver Babic	(Denmark) Mathias Christiansen (Denmark) David Daugaard	(France) Antoine Lodiot (France) Julien Maio
Boys' doubles	(Denmark) Kasper Antonsen (Denmark) Oliver Babic	(Denmark) Mathias Christiansen (Denmark) David Daugaard	(Germany) Johannes Pistorius (Germany) Marvin Emil Seidel
Girls' doubles	(Bulgaria) Gabriela Stoeva (Bulgaria) Stefani Stoeva	(Denmark) Julie Finne-Ipsen (Denmark) Rikke Søby Hansen	(Russia) Victoria Dergunova (Russia) Evgeniya Kosetskaya
Girls' doubles	(Bulgaria) Gabriela Stoeva (Bulgaria) Stefani Stoeva	(Denmark) Julie Finne-Ipsen (Denmark) Rikke Søby Hansen	(Turkey) Busenur Korkmaz (Turkey) Özge Toyran
Mixed doubles	(Denmark) David Daugaard (Denmark) Maiken Fruergaard	(Netherlands) Robin Tabeling (Netherlands) Myke Halkema	(Denmark) Kasper Antonsen (Denmark) Julie Finne-Ipsen
Mixed doubles	(Denmark) David Daugaard (Denmark) Maiken Fruergaard	(Netherlands) Robin Tabeling (Netherlands) Myke Halkema	(Germany) Mark Lamsfuß (Germany) Franziska Volkmann
Teams	Denmark; Kasper Antonsen; Oliver Babic; Mathias Christiansen; David Daugaard; Joshua Eipe; Mathias Mundbjerg; Rasmus Grill Noes; Mads Storgaard Sorensen; Victor Svendsen; Julie Davidsen; Julie Finne-Ipsen; Maiken Fruergaard; Sofie Futtrup; Rikke Søby Hansen; Sandra-Maria Jensen; Line Kjærsfeldt; Anna Thea Madsen; Isabella Nielsen; Natalia Koch Rohde	France; Pierrick Cajot; Tanguy Citron; Jordan Corvee; Jocelyn Deschamp; Bastian Kersaudy; Antoine Lodiot; Julien Maio; Loic Mittelheisser; Marie Batomene; Lole Courtois; Stacey Guerin; Delphine Lansac; Anne Tran	Netherlands; Mark Caljouw; Russell Muns; Robin Tabeling; Justin Teeuwen; Alida Chen; Myke Halkema; Cheryl Seinen; Manon Sibbald
Teams	Denmark; Kasper Antonsen; Oliver Babic; Mathias Christiansen; David Daugaard; Joshua Eipe; Mathias Mundbjerg; Rasmus Grill Noes; Mads Storgaard Sorensen; Victor Svendsen; Julie Davidsen; Julie Finne-Ipsen; Maiken Fruergaard; Sofie Futtrup; Rikke Søby Hansen; Sandra-Maria Jensen; Line Kjærsfeldt; Anna Thea Madsen; Isabella Nielsen; Natalia Koch Rohde	France; Pierrick Cajot; Tanguy Citron; Jordan Corvee; Jocelyn Deschamp; Bastian Kersaudy; Antoine Lodiot; Julien Maio; Loic Mittelheisser; Marie Batomene; Lole Courtois; Stacey Guerin; Delphine Lansac; Anne Tran	Germany; Mark Philipp Byerly; Mark Lamsfuß; Johannes Pistorius; Fabian Roth; Lars Schänzler; Marvin Emil Seidel; Max Weißkirchen; Anika Dörr; Ramona Hacks; Luise Heim; Lara Käpplein; Jennifer Karnott; Yvonne Li; Franziska Volkmann; Theresa Wurm

== Medal table ==
* Host nation (Turkey)

Rank	Nation	Gold	Silver	Bronze	Total
1	Denmark	3	3	1	7
2	Bulgaria	2	0	0	2
3	Germany	1	0	3	4
4	Netherlands	0	2	1	3
5	France	0	1	2	3
6	Turkey*	0	0	2	2
7	Austria	0	0	1	1
7	England	0	0	1	1
7	Russia	0	0	1	1
Totals (9 entries)		6	6	12	24
