= Amanda Madsen =

Danish badminton player (born 1994)

Personal information
- Born: 4 February 1994 (age 32)

Sport
- Country: Denmark
- Sport: Badminton

Women's Doubles & Mixed Doubles
- Highest ranking: 68 (WD) 19 Nov 2015; 56 (XD) 23 Sep 2015
- BWF profile

Amanda Madsen (born 4 February 1994) is a Danish badminton player.

== Achievements ==
=== BWF International Challenge/Series ===
Women's Doubles
Year	Tournament	Partner	Opponent	Score	Result
2015	Norwegian International	(Denmark) Isabella Nielsen	(Russia) Victoria Dergunova (Russia) Olga Morozova	17-21, 12–21	(silver) Runner-up
2015	Estonian International	(Denmark) Isabella Nielsen	(Australia) Setyana Mapasa (Australia) Gronya Somerville	5-21, 13–21	(silver) Runner-up

Mixed Doubles
Year	Tournament	Partner	Opponent	Score	Result
2015	Polish International	(Denmark) Kasper Antonsen	(Malaysia) Wong Fai Yin (Malaysia) Chow Mei Kuan	21–19, 21–12	(gold) Winner
2015	Dutch International	(Denmark) Kasper Antonsen	(Denmark) Kristoffer Knudsen (Denmark) Maja Rindshoej	21–19, 12–21, 21–18	(gold) Winner
2015	Estonian International	(Denmark) Kasper Antonsen	(Germany) Max Weisskirchen (Germany) Eva Janssens	21–17, 21–16	(gold) Winner

BWF International Challenge tournament
BWF International Series tournament
BWF Future Series tournament
