= Johannes Pistorius (badminton) =

German badminton player (born 1995)

Personal information
- Born: Johannes Maria Pistorius; 16 June 1995 (age 31) Roth, Germany
- Height: 1.80 m (5 ft 11 in)

Sport
- Country: Germany
- Sport: Badminton
- Handedness: Right

Men's & mixed doubles
- Highest ranking: 83 (MD 23 September 2015); 96 (XD 15 September 2016)
- BWF profile
Medal record
Men's badminton
Representing Germany
European Mixed Team Championships
Bronze medal – third place	2021 Vantaa	Mixed team
European Junior Championships
Bronze medal – third place	2013 Ankara	Boys' doubles
Bronze medal – third place	2013 Ankara	Mixed team

Johannes Maria Pistorius (born 16 June 1995) is a German badminton player. Born in Roth, Bavaria, Pistorius started playing badminton at aged 5, trained at the NSP Nürnberg since 2008, and joined the TSV 1906 Freystadt in 2014. He was the bronze medalists at the 2013 European Junior Championships in the boys' doubles and mixed team event. He graduated from Bertolt-Brecht school, and now educated at the Saarland University of Applied Sciences.

== Achievements ==
=== European Junior Championships ===
Boys' doubles
Year	Venue	Partner	Opponent	Score	Result
2013	ASKI Sport Hall; Ankara, Turkey	(Germany) Marvin Seidel	(Denmark) Mathias Christiansen (Denmark) David Daugaard	20–22, 16–21	Bronze

=== BWF International Challenge/Series (7 runners-up) ===
Men's doubles
Year	Tournament	Partner	Opponent	Score	Result
2015	Dutch International	(Germany) Marvin Seidel	(Denmark) Kasper Antonsen (Denmark) Oliver Babic	9–21, 15–21	(silver) Runner-up
2015	Slovenia International	(Germany) Marvin Seidel	(Croatia) Zvonimir Đurkinjak (Croatia) Zvonimir Hölbling	14–21, 21–16, 10–21	(silver) Runner-up
2018	Estonian International	(Germany) Peter Käsbauer	(Russia) Andrey Parakhodin (Russia) Nikolai Ukk	21–14, 18–21, 19–21	(silver) Runner-up
2018	KaBaL International	(Germany) Peter Käsbauer	(Germany) Bjarne Geiss (Germany) Jan Colin Völker	13–21, 14–21	(silver) Runner-up
2018	White Nights	(Germany) Daniel Hess	(Germany) Bjarne Geiss (Germany) Jan Colin Völker	21–16, 22–24, 18–21	(silver) Runner-up
2018	Kharkiv International	(Germany) Daniel Hess	(India) Krishna Prasad Garaga (India) Dhruv Kapila	19–21, 16–21	(silver) Runner-up

Mixed doubles
Year	Tournament	Partner	Opponent	Score	Result
2021	Ukraine International	(Germany) Emma Moszczynski	(Malaysia) Yap Roy King (Malaysia) Valeree Siow	19–21, 12–21	(silver) Runner-up

BWF International Challenge tournament
BWF International Series tournament
BWF Future Series tournament
