= Mark Caljouw =

Dutch badminton player

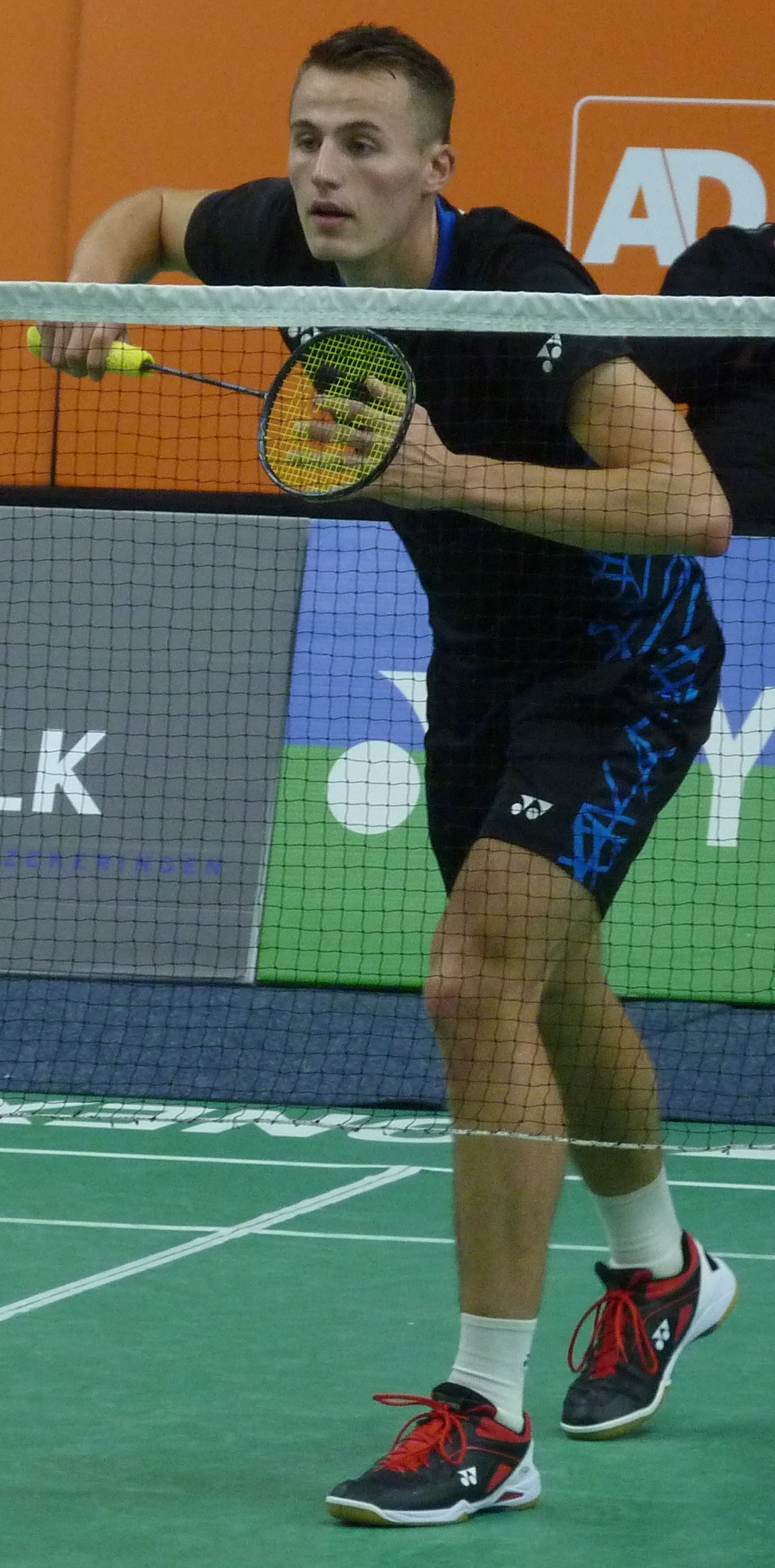

Personal information
- Born: 25 January 1995 (age 31) Rijswijk, the Netherlands
- Years active: 2012
- Height: 1.84 m (6 ft 0 in)

Sport
- Country: The Netherlands
- Sport: Badminton
- Handedness: Right

Men's singles
- Highest ranking: 23 (3 August 2021)
- BWF profile
Medal record
Men's badminton
Representing Netherlands
European Mixed Team Championships
Bronze medal – third place	2019 Copenhagen	Mixed team
European Men's Team Championships
Silver medal – second place	2020 Liévin	Men's team
European Junior Championships
Silver medal – second place	2013 Ankara	Boys' singles
Bronze medal – third place	2013 Ankara	Mixed team

Mark Caljouw (born 25 January 1995) is a Dutch badminton player. He started playing badminton aged eight, at BC Randstad in Rijswijk.

== Career ==
Caljouw was selected to join the national team in 2008, and made a debut in international senior tournament in 2012.

Caljouw competed at the 2013 European Junior Championships in Ankara, Turkey, winning a silver medal in the boys' singles event, and also a bronze medal in the mixed team event. He was selected by Badminton Europe to join the Player Development Plan "Future Stars". Caljouw won the men's singles National Championships title in 2017, beating defending champion Erik Meijs in the semi-finals and first seeded Nick Fransman in the final. He defended the title in 2018, after beating Fransman, and also in 2019 beating Aram Mahmoud in the final and again in 2020 and 2022, each time beating youngster Joran Kweekel in the final.

He reached the semi-finals of the Dutch Open and the Scottish Open both twice in 2017 and 2018. In 2017, he also reached the semi-final of the Bitburger Open in Germany. In 2018 he won his first big title the Orléans Masters then a BWF Tour 100 event, after defending the title he won the previous year when the event was still an International Challenge event. In 2018, he also reached the final of the US Open, an BWF Tour 300 event. In 2019 he won the Austrian Open and the Kharkiv International, both International Challenge events.

== Achievements ==
=== European Junior Championships ===
Boys' singles
Year	Venue	Opponent	Score	Result
2013	ASKI Sport Hall; Ankara, Turkey	(Germany) Fabian Roth	17–21, 14–21	Silver

=== BWF World Tour (1 title, 3 runners-up) ===
The BWF World Tour, which was announced on 19 March 2017 and implemented in 2018, is a series of elite badminton tournaments sanctioned by the Badminton World Federation (BWF). The BWF World Tour is divided into levels of World Tour Finals, Super 1000, Super 750, Super 500, Super 300, and the BWF Tour Super 100.

Men's singles
Year	Tournament	Level	Opponent	Score	Result
2018	Orléans Masters	Super 100	(Denmark) Rasmus Gemke	10–21, 21–18, 21–8	(gold) Winner
2018	U.S. Open	Super 300	(South Korea) Lee Dong-keun	21–14, 17–21, 16–21	(silver) Runner-up
2020	SaarLorLux Open	Super 100	(France) Toma Junior Popov	20–22, 21–19, 14–21	(silver) Runner-up
2023	Abu Dhabi Masters	Super 100	(Denmark) Mads Christophersen	19–21, 15–21	(silver) Runner-up

=== BWF International Challenge/Series (3 titles, 2 runner-up) ===
Men's singles
Year	Tournament	Opponent	Score	Result
2013	Norwegian International	(Finland) Kasper Lehikoinen	17–21, 16–21	(silver) Runner-up
2017	Orléans International	(France) Lucas Corvée	21–6, 18–21, 21–11	(gold) Winner
2019	Austrian Open	(China) Li Shifeng	8–21, 23–21, 21–9	(gold) Winner
2019	Kharkiv International	(Azerbaijan) Ade Resky Dwicahyo	21–15, 21–10	(gold) Winner
2023	Denmark Masters	(Chinese Taipei) Huang Yu-kai	18–21, 13–21	(silver) Runner-up

BWF International Challenge tournament
BWF International Series tournament
BWF Future Series tournament
