= Fabian Roth =

German badminton player (born 1995)

Personal information
- Born: 29 November 1995 (age 30) Karlsruhe, Germany
- Height: 1.91 m (6 ft 3 in)

Sport
- Country: Germany
- Sport: Badminton
- Handedness: Right

Men's singles
- Highest ranking: 34 (20 July 2017)
- BWF profile
Medal record
Men's badminton
Representing Germany
European Mixed Team Championships
Bronze medal – third place	2015 Leuven	Mixed team
Bronze medal – third place	2017 Lubin	Mixed team
Bronze medal – third place	2021 Vantaa	Mixed team
Bronze medal – third place	2023 Aire-sur-la-Lys	Mixed team
Bronze medal – third place	2025 Baku	Mixed team
European Men's Team Championships
Bronze medal – third place	2014 Basel	Men's team
Bronze medal – third place	2018 Kazan	Men's team
European Junior Championships
Gold medal – first place	2013 Ankara	Boys' singles
Bronze medal – third place	2013 Ankara	Mixed team

Fabian Roth (born 29 November 1995) is a German badminton player. He started playing badminton at aged 6, and joined Germany national badminton team in 2013. He was the boys' singles gold medalist at the 2013 European Junior Championships.

== Achievements ==
=== European Junior Championships ===
Boys' singles
Year	Venue	Opponent	Score	Result
2013	ASKI Sport Hall; Ankara, Turkey	(Netherlands) Mark Caljouw	21–17, 21–14	Gold

=== BWF International Challenge/Series ===
Men's singles
Year	Tournament	Opponent	Score	Result
2015	Hellas International	(England) Toby Penty	21–19, 19–21, 21–19	(gold) Winner
2016	Czech International	(Spain) Pablo Abián	21–10, 17–21, 15–21	(silver) Runner-up
2016	Irish Open	(Republic of Ireland) Scott Evans	22–20, 9–21, 21–15	(gold) Winner

Mixed doubles
Year	Tournament	Partner	Opponent	Score	Result
2012	Turkey International	(Germany) Jennifer Karnott	(Republic of Ireland) Sam Magee (Republic of Ireland) Chloe Magee	10–21, 14–21	(silver) Runner-up

BWF International Challenge tournament
BWF International Series tournament
BWF Future Series tournament
