= Oliver Babic =

Danish badminton player (born 1994)

Personal information
- Born: 3 June 1994 (age 32)

Sport
- Country: Denmark
- Sport: Badminton

Men's & mixed doubles
- Highest ranking: 69 (MD 16 July 2015); 903 (XD 23 May 2013)
- BWF profile
Medal record
Men's badminton
Representing Denmark
European Junior Championships
Gold medal – first place	2013 Ankara	Boys' doubles
Gold medal – first place	2013 Ankara	Mixed team

Oliver Babic (born 3 June 1994) is a Danish badminton player.

== Achievements ==
=== European Junior Championships ===
Boys' doubles
Year	Venue	Partner	Opponent	Score	Result
2013	Aski Sports Hall; Ankara, Turkey	(Denmark) Kasper Antonsen	(Denmark) Mathias Christiansen (Denmark) David Daugaard	21–17, 25–23	Gold

=== BWF International Challenge/Series ===
Men's doubles
Year	Tournament	Partner	Opponent	Score	Result
2014	Finnish International	(Denmark) Kasper Antonsen	(Denmark) Mathias Bay-Smidt (Denmark) Frederik Søgaard	23–25, 21–15, 17–21	(silver) Runner-up
2015	Dutch International	(Denmark) Kasper Antonsen	(Germany) Johannes Pistorius (Germany) Marvin Seidel	21–9, 21–15	(gold) Winner
2015	Spanish International	(Denmark) Kasper Antonsen	(Poland) Adam Cwalina (Poland) Przemysław Wacha	17–21, 14–21	(silver) Runner-up

BWF International Challenge tournament
BWF International Series tournament
BWF Future Series tournament
