= Polish International =

Badminton championships

The Polish International in badminton is an international open held in Poland since 2012. The tournament belongs to the European Badminton Circuit. The Polish International is a BWF International Series rated tournament which is the second step on the senior Continental Circuit after BWF Future Series. Not to be confused with the Polish Open which is a BWF International Challenge, one step higher, and is played at the opposite end of the calendar year.

== Previous winners ==
Year	Men's singles	Women's singles	Men's doubles	Women's doubles	Mixed doubles	Ref
2012	(Scotland) Kieran Merrilees	(Scotland) Kirsty Gilmour	(Poland) Łukasz Moreń (Poland) Wojciech Szkudlarczyk	(Poland) Kamila Augustyn (Poland) Agnieszka Wojtkowska	(England) Andrew Ellis (England) Jenny Wallwork	
2013	(Chinese Taipei) Lin Yu-hsien	(Chinese Taipei) Cheng Chi-ya	(Chinese Taipei) Chen Chung-jen (Chinese Taipei) Wang Chi-lin	(Chinese Taipei) Lee Chia-hsin (Chinese Taipei) Wu Ti-jung	(Chinese Taipei) Lin Chia-hsuan (Chinese Taipei) Hsu Ya-ching	
2014	(Poland) Michał Rogalski	(England) Panuga Riou	(Poland) Adam Cwalina (Poland) Paweł Pietryja	(Turkey) Cemre Fere (Turkey) Ebru Tunalı	(Poland) Robert Mateusiak (Poland) Agnieszka Wojtkowska	
2015	(Malaysia) Iskandar Zulkarnain Zainuddin	(Malaysia) Ho Yen Mei	(Denmark) Kasper Antonsen (Denmark) Niclas Nøhr	(Sweden) Clara Nistad (Sweden) Emma Wengberg	(Denmark) Kasper Antonsen (Denmark) Amanda Madsen	
2016	(Denmark) Victor Svendsen	(India) Rituparna Das	(Chinese Taipei) Lu Ching-yao (Chinese Taipei) Yang Po-han	(India) Sanjana Santosh (India) Arathi Sara Sunil	(Denmark) Mikkel Mikkelsen (Denmark) Mai Surrow	
2017	(Malaysia) Lee Zii Jia	(Switzerland) Ayla Huser	(Republic of Ireland) Nhat Nguyen (Republic of Ireland) Paul Reynolds	(England) Jenny Moore (England) Victoria Williams	(Denmark) Kristoffer Knudsen (Denmark) Isabella Nielsen	
2018	(Germany) Kai Schäfer	(India) Rituparna Das	(Chinese Taipei) Lin Shang-kai (Chinese Taipei) Tseng Min-hao	(Japan) Mamiko Ishibashi (Japan) Mirai Shinoda	(Czech Republic) Jakub Bitman (Czech Republic) Alžběta Bášová	
2019	(Denmark) Mads Christophersen	(Wales) Jordan Hart	(England) Zach Russ (England) Steven Stallwood	(Denmark) Amalie Magelund (Denmark) Freja Ravn	(Denmark) Mikkel Mikkelsen (Denmark) Amalie Magelund	
2020	Cancelled (Note: This tournament, originally to be played from 17 to 20 September, was later cancelled due to the COVID-19 pandemic in Poland.)					
2021	(India) Kiran George	(Singapore) Jaslyn Hooi	(India) Ishaan Bhatnagar (India) Sai Pratheek K.	(France) Margot Lambert (France) Anne Tran	(France) William Villeger (France) Anne Tran	
2022	(Japan) Yushi Tanaka	(Japan) Hirari Mizui	(Chinese Taipei) Chiu Hsiang-chieh (Chinese Taipei) Yang Ming-tse	(Japan) Miku Shigeta (Japan) Yui Suizu	(Chinese Taipei) Chiu Hsiang-chieh (Chinese Taipei) Lin Xiao-min	
2023	(Indonesia) Andi Fadel Muhammad	(Japan) Sorano Yoshikawa	(England) Callum Hemming (England) Ethan van Leeuwen	(Turkey) Bengisu Erçetin (Turkey) Nazlıcan İnci	(England) Callum Hemming (England) Estelle van Leeuwen	
2024	(Denmark) Ditlev Jæger Holm	(India) Anmol Kharb	(Singapore) Wesley Koh (Singapore) Junsuke Kubo	(Poland) Paulina Hankiewicz (Poland) Kornelia Marczak	(Denmark) Kristoffer Kolding (Denmark) Mette Werge	
2025	(Denmark) William Bøgebjerg	(Chinese Taipei) Peng Yu-wei	(Japan) Shuji Sawada (Japan) Tsubasa Yoshida	(Japan) Yuma Nagasako (Japan) Aya Tamaki	(Japan) Shuji Sawada (Japan) Aya Tamaki	
2026	(South Korea) Choi Pyeong-gang	(Republic of Ireland) Sophia Noble	(Spain) Jacobo Fernández (Spain) Alberto Perals	(Chinese Taipei) Chen Hsin-tung (Chinese Taipei) Chen Yu-hsi	(Netherlands) Andy Buijk (Netherlands) Meerte Loos	

== Performances by nation ==
As of the 2026 edition

	Nation	MS	WS	MD	WD	XD	Total
1	Chinese Taipei	1	2	4	2	2	11
1	Denmark	4	0	1	1	5	11
3	Japan	1	2	1	3	1	8
4	England	0	1	2	1	2	6
4	India	1	3	1	1	0	6
4	Poland*	1	0	2	2	1	6
7	Malaysia	2	1	0	0	0	3
8	France	0	0	0	1	1	2
8	Ireland	0	1	1	0	0	2
8	Scotland	1	1	0	0	0	2
8	Singapore	0	1	1	0	0	2
8	Turkey	0	0	0	2	0	2
13	Czech Republic	0	0	0	0	1	1
13	Germany	1	0	0	0	0	1
13	Indonesia	1	0	0	0	0	1
13	Netherlands	0	0	0	0	1	1
13	South Korea	1	0	0	0	0	1
13	Spain	0	0	1	0	0	1
13	Sweden	0	0	0	1	0	1
13	Switzerland	0	1	0	0	0	1
13	Wales	0	1	0	0	0	1
	Total	14	14	14	14	14	70

* Host nation
