= David Daugaard =

Danish badminton player (born 1994)

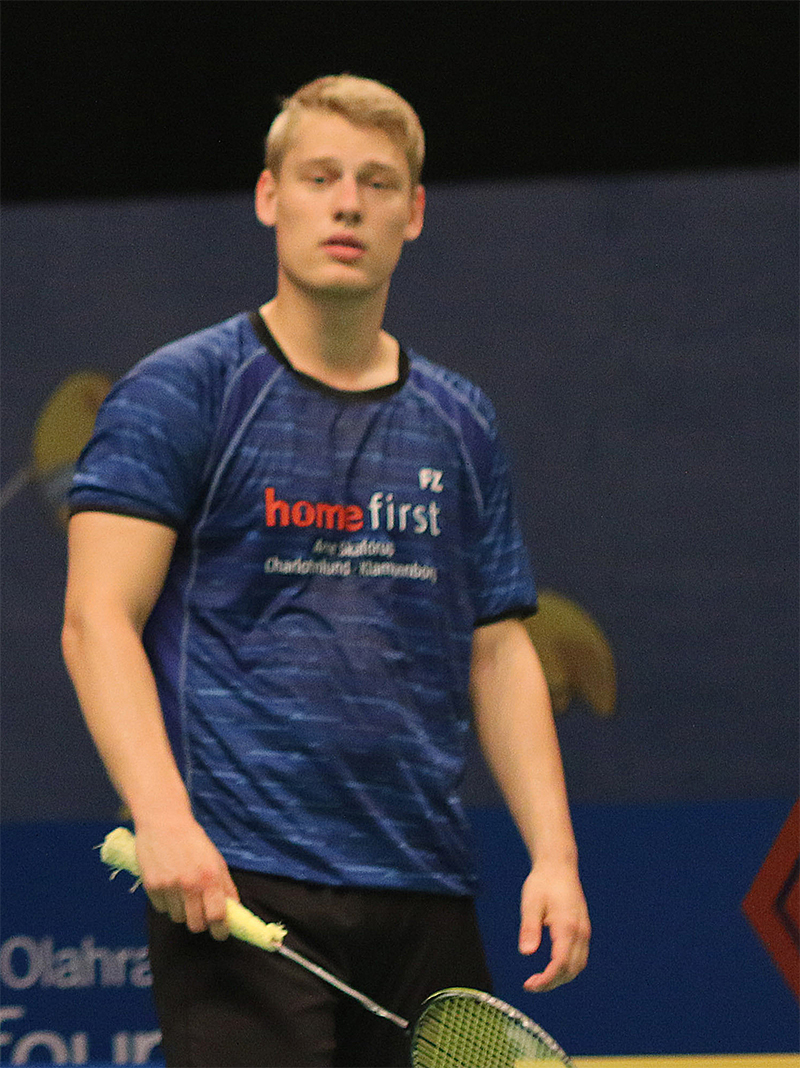

Personal information
- Born: 27 December 1994 (age 31) Copenhagen, Denmark
- Years active: 2012
- Height: 1.85 m (6 ft 1 in)

Sport
- Country: Denmark
- Sport: Badminton
- Handedness: Right

Men's doubles
- Highest ranking: 19 with Mathias Christiansen (21 September 2017)
- BWF profile
Medal record
Men's badminton
Representing Denmark
European Championships
Bronze medal – third place	2017 Kolding	Men's doubles
European Mixed Team Championships
Gold medal – first place	2019 Copenhagen	Mixed team
European Men's Team Championships
Gold medal – first place	2018 Kazan	Men's team
European Junior Championships
Gold medal – first place	2013 Ankara	Mixed doubles
Gold medal – first place	2013 Ankara	Mixed team
Silver medal – second place	2013 Ankara	Boys' doubles

David Daugaard (born 27 December 1994) is a Danish badminton player. In 2013, he won gold medal in mixed doubles event and silver medal in boys' doubles event at the European Junior Championships.

== Achievements ==
=== European Championships ===
Men's doubles
Year	Venue	Partner	Opponent	Score	Result
2017	Sydbank Arena; Kolding, Denmark	(Denmark) Mathias Christiansen	(Denmark) Mathias Boe (Denmark) Carsten Mogensen	10–21, 15–21	Bronze

=== European Junior Championships ===
Boys' doubles
Year	Venue	Partner	Opponent	Score	Result
2013	ASKI Sport Hall; Ankara, Turkey	(Denmark) Mathias Christiansen	(Denmark) Kasper Antonsen (Denmark) Oliver Babic	17–21, 23–25	Silver

Mixed doubles
Year	Venue	Partner	Opponent	Score	Result
2013	ASKI Sport Hall; Ankara, Turkey	(Denmark) Maiken Fruergaard	(Netherlands) Robin Tabeling (Netherlands) Myke Halkema	21–15, 21–18	Gold

=== BWF World Tour ===
The BWF World Tour, which was announced on 19 March 2017 and implemented in 2018, is a series of elite badminton tournaments sanctioned by the Badminton World Federation (BWF). The BWF World Tours are divided into levels of World Tour Finals, Super 1000, Super 750, Super 500, Super 300 (part of the HSBC World Tour), and the BWF Tour Super 100.

Men's doubles
Year	Tournament	Level	Partner	Opponent	Score	Result
2018	Scottish Open	Super 100	(Denmark) Frederik Søgaard	(England) Marcus Ellis (England) Chris Langridge	21–23, 16–21	(silver) Runner-up

=== BWF Grand Prix ===
The BWF Grand Prix had two levels, the Grand Prix and Grand Prix Gold. It was a series of badminton tournaments sanctioned by the Badminton World Federation (BWF) and played between 2007 and 2017.

Men's doubles
Year	Tournament	Partner	Opponent	Score	Result
2014	Scottish Open	(Denmark) Mathias Christiansen	(Germany) Raphael Beck (Germany) Andreas Heinz	21–13, 21–17	(gold) Winner
2016	Dutch Open	(Denmark) Mathias Christiansen	(Chinese Taipei) Lee Jhe-huei (Chinese Taipei) Lee Yang	17–21, 17–21	(silver) Runner-up
2016	Scottish Open	(Denmark) Mathias Christiansen	(Scotland) Adam Hall (England) Peter Mills	15–21, 21–19, 21–15	(gold) Winner

BWF Grand Prix Gold tournament
BWF Grand Prix tournament

=== BWF International Challenge/Series ===
Men's doubles
Year	Tournament	Partner	Opponent	Score	Result
2014	Croatian International	(Denmark) Mathias Christiansen	(Denmark) Theodor Johansen (Denmark) Mads Pedersen	21–8, 21–12	(gold) Winner
2014	Hellas International	(Denmark) Mathias Christiansen	(Denmark) Frederik Colberg (Denmark) Mikkel Mikkelsen	0–0 retired	(gold) Winner
2014	Belgian International	(Denmark) Mathias Christiansen	(Netherlands) Jacco Arends (Netherlands) Jelle Maas	11–10, 6–11, 8–11, 11–7, 11–9	(gold) Winner
2015	Finnish Open	(Denmark) Mathias Christiansen	(England) Andrew Ellis (England) Peter Mills	19–21, 12–21	(silver) Runner-up
2015	Italian International	(Denmark) Mathias Christiansen	(Denmark) Kasper Antonsen (Denmark) Niclas Nøhr	22–24, 14–21	(silver) Runner-up
2016	Swedish Masters	(Denmark) Mathias Christiansen	(Denmark) Kim Astrup (Denmark) Anders Skaarup Rasmussen	21–19, 21–23, 21–19	(gold) Winner
2016	Finnish Open	(Denmark) Mathias Christiansen	(Poland) Adam Cwalina (Poland) Przemysław Wacha	21–23, 21–12, 21–12	(gold) Winner
2016	Spanish International	(Denmark) Mathias Christiansen	(Japan) Takuro Hoki (Japan) Yugo Kobayashi	10–21, 6–21	(silver) Runner-up
2018	Belgian International	(Denmark) Frederik Søgaard	(Netherlands) Jacco Arends (Netherlands) Ruben Jille	21–11, 18–21, 17–21	(silver) Runner-up
2018	Hungarian International	(Denmark) Frederik Søgaard	(Poland) Miłosz Bochat (Poland) Adam Cwalina	15–21, 21–12, 21–12	(gold) Winner

BWF International Challenge tournament
BWF International Series tournament
BWF Future Series tournament
