= Mathias Bay-Smidt =

Danish badminton player (born 1996)

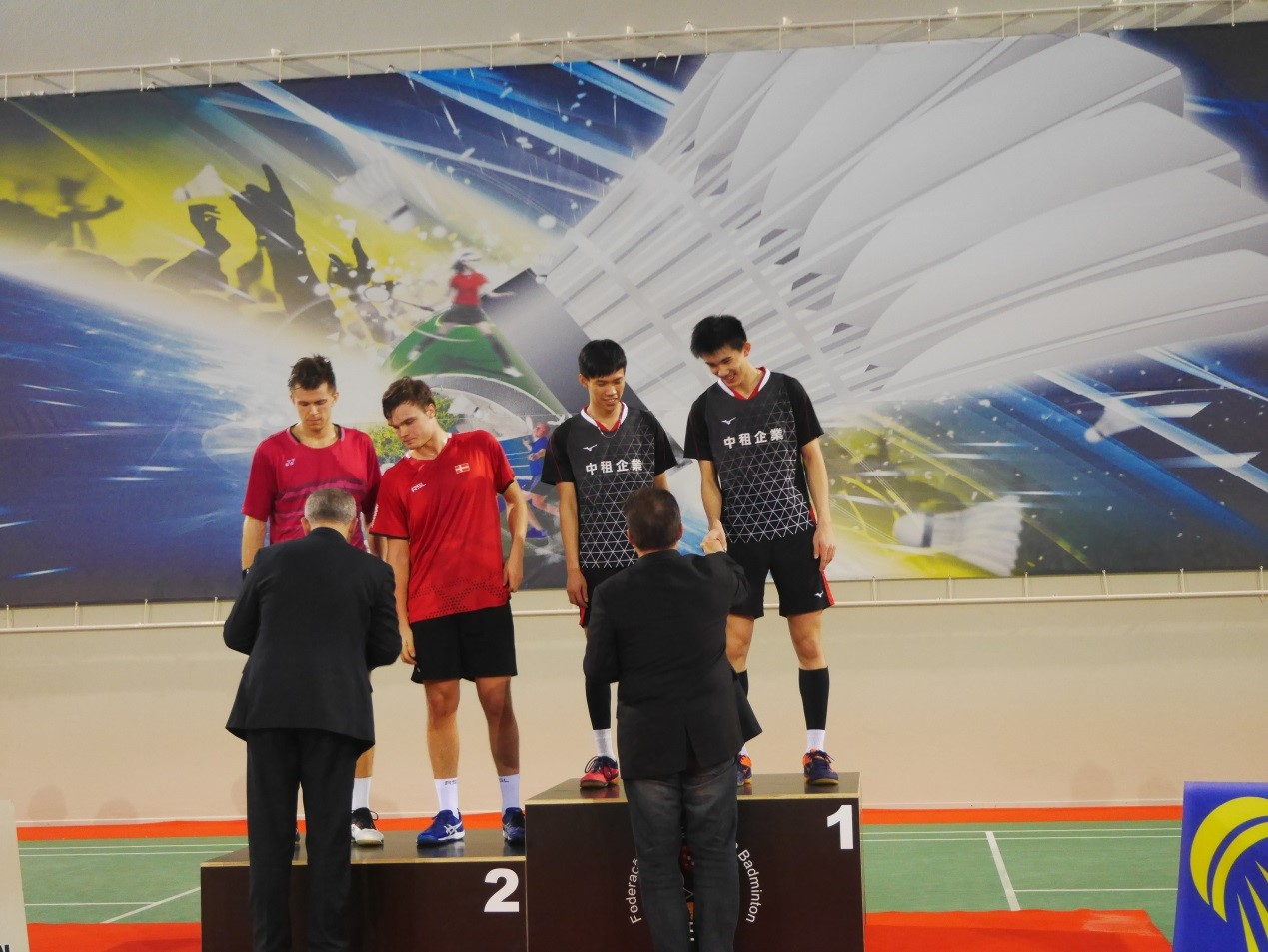

Personal information
- Born: 19 March 1996 (age 30) Odder, Denmark
- Height: 1.91 m (6 ft 3 in)

Sport
- Country: Denmark
- Sport: Badminton
- Handedness: Right

Men's & mixed doubles
- Highest ranking: 48 (MD with Lasse Mølhede 26 November 2019); 46 (XD with Rikke Søby Hansen 10 March 2020)
- BWF profile
Medal record
Men's badminton
Representing Denmark
European Junior Championships
Bronze medal – third place	2015 Lubin	Boys' doubles
Bronze medal – third place	2015 Lubin	Mixed team

Mathias Bay-Smidt (born 19 March 1996) is a Danish badminton player. In 2014, he won his first senior international title at the Finnish International tournament in the men's doubles event partnered with Frederik Søgaard. In 2016, he won the Czech International tournament in the mixed doubles event partnered with Alexandra Bøje after fight through the qualification round, with the eight matches played.

== Achievements ==
=== European Junior Championships ===
Boys' doubles
Year	Venue	Partner	Opponent	Score	Result
2015	Regional Sport Centrum Hall; Lubin, Poland	(Denmark) Frederik Søgaard	(England) Ben Lane (England) Sean Vendy	15–21, 21–19, 18–21	Bronze

=== BWF World Tour (1 title, 1 runner-up) ===
The BWF World Tour, which was announced on 19 March 2017 and implemented in 2018, is a series of elite badminton tournaments sanctioned by the Badminton World Federation (BWF). The BWF World Tours are divided into levels of World Tour Finals, Super 1000, Super 750, Super 500, Super 300 (part of the HSBC World Tour), and the BWF Tour Super 100.

Men's doubles
Year	Tournament	Level	Partner	Opponent	Score	Result
2019	SaarLorLux Open	Super 100	(Denmark) Lasse Mølhede	(China) Di Zijian (China) Wang Chang	17–21, 15–21	(silver) Runner-up

Mixed doubles
Year	Tournament	Level	Partner	Opponent	Score	Result
2019	Swiss Open	Super 300	(Denmark) Rikke Søby Hansen	(Indonesia) Rinov Rivaldy (Indonesia) Pitha Haningtyas Mentari	21–18, 12–21, 21–16	(gold) Winner

=== BWF International Challenge/Series (5 titles, 8 runners-up) ===
Men's doubles
Year	Tournament	Partner	Opponent	Score	Result
2014	Finnish International	(Denmark) Frederik Søgaard	(Denmark) Kasper Antonsen (Denmark) Oliver Babic	25–23, 15–21, 21–17	(gold) Winner
2016	Slovenia International	(Denmark) Frederik Søgaard	(Republic of Ireland) Joshua Magee (Republic of Ireland) Sam Magee	9–21, 22–20, 18–21	(silver) Runner-up
2016	Czech International	(Denmark) Frederik Søgaard	(Chinese Taipei) Lu Ching-yao (Chinese Taipei) Yang Po-han	17–21, 22–20, 15–21	(silver) Runner-up
2018	Portugal International	(Denmark) Frederik Søgaard	(Chinese Taipei) Lu Chen (Chinese Taipei) Ye Hong-wei	21–23, 18–21	(silver) Runner-up
2018	Italian International	(Denmark) Lasse Mølhede	(Russia) Vitalij Durkin (Russia) Nikolai Ukk	21–11, 21–11	(gold) Winner
2019	Swedish Open	(Denmark) Lasse Mølhede	(France) Bastian Kersaudy (France) Julien Maio	21–12, 21–15	(gold) Winner

Mixed doubles
Year	Tournament	Partner	Opponent	Score	Result
2016	Czech International	(Denmark) Alexandra Bøje	(Russia) Vasily Kuznetsov (Russia) Ekaterina Bolotova	21–19, 21–15	(gold) Winner
2016	Norwegian International	(Denmark) Alexandra Bøje	(Finland) Anton Kaisti (Finland) Jenny Nyström	12–21, 12–21	(silver) Runner-up
2017	Swedish International	(Denmark) Alexandra Bøje	(Denmark) Mikkel Mikkelsen (Denmark) Mai Surrow	18–21, 14–21	(silver) Runner-up
2017	Czech Open	(Denmark) Alexandra Bøje	(France) Bastian Kersaudy (France) Léa Palermo	12–21, 21–8, 21–18	(gold) Winner
2019	Finnish Open	(Denmark) Rikke Søby Hansen	(Indonesia) Rehan Naufal Kusharjanto (Indonesia) Lisa Ayu Kusumawati	20–22, 21–15, 14–21	(silver) Runner-up
2019	Spanish International	(Denmark) Rikke Søby Hansen	(England) Ben Lane (England) Jessica Pugh	13–21, 26–24, 18–21	(silver) Runner-up
2019	Scottish Open	(Denmark) Rikke Søby Hansen	(Denmark) Mathias Christiansen (Denmark) Alexandra Bøje	21–23, 16–21	(silver) Runner-up

BWF International Challenge tournament
BWF International Series tournament
BWF Future Series tournament
