= Kasper Antonsen =

Danish badminton player

Personal information
- Born: 13 April 1994 (age 32) Aarhus, Denmark
- Height: 1.79 m (5 ft 10 in)

Sport
- Country: Denmark
- Sport: Badminton

Men's & mixed doubles
- Highest ranking: 32 (MD with Niclas Nøhr 22 September 2016); 56 (XD with Amanda Madsen 23 September 2015)
- BWF profile
Medal record
Men's badminton
Representing Denmark
European Junior Championships
Gold medal – first place	2013 Ankara	Mixed team
Gold medal – first place	2013 Ankara	Boys' doubles
Bronze medal – third place	2013 Ankara	Mixed doubles

Kasper Antonsen (born 13 April 1994) is a Danish badminton player. Together with his brother Anders Antonsen, he started his career in badminton in Viby, learned from his father who worked at one of the badminton clubs in Aarhus called AB. Antonsen who trained at the Aarhus AB, made his professional debut in 2012, and later, he won the gold medals at the 2013 European Junior Championships in the boys' doubles and mixed team events, also a bronze medal in the mixed doubles event.

== Achievements ==
=== European Junior Championships ===
Boys' doubles
Year	Venue	Partner	Opponent	Score	Result
2013	ASKI Sport Hall; Ankara, Turkey	(Denmark) Oliver Babic	(Denmark) Mathias Christiansen (Denmark) David Daugaard	21–17, 25–23	Gold

Mixed doubles
Year	Venue	Partner	Opponent	Score	Result
2013	ASKI Sport Hall; Ankara, Turkey	(Denmark) Julie Finne-Ipsen	(Netherlands) Robin Tabeling (Netherlands) Myke Halkema	21–23, 21–16, 19–21	Bronze

=== BWF International Challenge/Series (8 titles, 3 runners-up) ===
Men's doubles
Year	Tournament	Partner	Opponent	Score	Result
2012	Denmark International	(Denmark) Rasmus Bonde	(Denmark) Christian John Skovgaard (Denmark) Mads Pieler Kolding	17–21, 10–21	(silver) Runner-up
2014	Dutch International	(Denmark) Mikkel Delbo Larsen	(Denmark) Rasmus Fladberg (Denmark) Emil Holst	21–15, 21–18	(gold) Winner
2014	Finnish International	(Denmark) Oliver Babic	(Denmark) Mathias Bay-Smidt (Denmark) Frederik Søgaard	23–25, 21–15, 17–21	(silver) Runner-up
2015	Dutch International	(Denmark) Oliver Babic	(Germany) Johannes Pistorius (Germany) Marvin Seidel	21–9, 21–15	(gold) Winner
2015	Spanish International	(Denmark) Oliver Babic	(Poland) Adam Cwalina (Poland) Przemysław Wacha	17–21, 14–21	(silver) Runner-up
2015	Italian International	(Denmark) Niclas Nøhr	(Denmark) Mathias Christiansen (Denmark) David Daugaard	24–22, 21–14	(gold) Winner
2015	Turkey International	(Denmark) Niclas Nøhr	(Poland) Adam Cwalina (Poland) Przemysław Wacha	21–16, 21–15	(gold) Winner
2017	Hellas Open	(Denmark) Niclas Nøhr	(Finland) Henri Aarnio (Finland) Iikka Heino	21–17, 21–12	(gold) Winner

Mixed doubles
Year	Tournament	Partner	Opponent	Score	Result
2015	Estonian International	(Denmark) Amanda Madsen	(Germany) Max Weißkirchen (Germany) Eva Janssens	21–17, 21–16	(gold) Winner
2015	Dutch International	(Denmark) Amanda Madsen	(Denmark) Kristoffer Knudsen (Denmark) Maja Rindshøj	21–19, 12–21, 21–18	(gold) Winner
2015	Polish International	(Denmark) Amanda Madsen	(Malaysia) Wong Fai Yin (Malaysia) Chow Mei Kuan	21–19, 21–12	(gold) Winner

BWF International Challenge tournament
BWF International Series tournament
BWF Future Series tournament
