= Rikke Søby Hansen =

Danish badminton player (born 1995)

Personal information
- Born: 1 February 1995 (age 31) Glostrup, Denmark
- Years active: 2012
- Height: 1.78 m (5 ft 10 in)

Sport
- Country: Denmark
- Sport: Badminton
- Handedness: Right

Women's & mixed doubles
- Highest ranking: 25 (WD with Julie Finne-Ipsen 15 June 2017); 27 (XD with Mikkel Mikkelsen 25 October 2022)
- Current ranking: 28 (XD with Mikkel Mikkelsen 24 January 2023)
- BWF profile
Medal record
Women's badminton
Representing Denmark
European Championships
Bronze medal – third place	2022 Madrid	Mixed doubles
European Mixed Team Championships
Gold medal – first place	2019 Copenhagen	Mixed team
Gold medal – first place	2023 Aire-sur-la-Lys	Mixed team
European Women's Team Championships
Gold medal – first place	2014 Basel	Women's team
Gold medal – first place	2018 Kazan	Women's team
European Junior Championships
Gold medal – first place	2013 Ankara	Mixed team
Silver medal – second place	2013 Ankara	Girls' doubles
Bronze medal – third place	2011 Vantaa	Mixed team

Rikke Søby Hansen (born 1 February 1995) is a Danish badminton player affiliated with Greve team. She won silver medal at the 2013 European Junior Championships in the girls' doubles event.

== Achievements ==
=== European Championships ===
Mixed doubles
Year	Venue	Partner	Opponent	Score	Result
2022	Polideportivo Municipal Gallur, Madrid, Spain	(Denmark) Mikkel Mikkelsen	(Germany) Mark Lamsfuß (Germany) Isabel Lohau	21–12, 16–21, 17–21	Bronze

=== European Junior Championships ===
Girls' doubles
Year	Venue	Partner	Opponent	Score	Result
2013	Aski Sports Hall; Ankara, Turkey	(Denmark) Julie Finne-Ipsen	(Bulgaria) Gabriela Stoeva (Bulgaria) Stefani Stoeva	11–21, 18–21	Silver

=== BWF World Tour (1 title) ===
The BWF World Tour, which was announced on 19 March 2017 and implemented in 2018, is a series of elite badminton tournaments sanctioned by the Badminton World Federation (BWF). The BWF World Tour is divided into levels of World Tour Finals, Super 1000, Super 750, Super 500, Super 300 (part of the HSBC World Tour), and the BWF Tour Super 100.

Mixed doubles
Year	Tournament	Level	Partner	Opponent	Score	Result
2019	Swiss Open	Super 300	(Denmark) Mathias Bay-Smidt	(Indonesia) Rinov Rivaldy (Indonesia) Pitha Haningtyas Mentari	21–18, 12–21, 21–16	(gold) Winner

=== BWF International Challenge/Series (5 titles, 13 runners-up) ===
Women's doubles
Year	Tournament	Partner	Opponent	Score	Result
2012	Hungarian International	(Denmark) Julie Finne-Ipsen	(Germany) Carola Bott (Croatia) Staša Poznanović	17–21, 21–23	(silver) Runner-up
2013	Estonian International	(Denmark) Julie Finne-Ipsen	(Russia) Irina Khlebko (Russia) Ksenia Polikarpova	21–15, 19–21, 20–22	(silver) Runner-up
2013	Croatian International	(Denmark) Julie Finne-Ipsen	(Russia) Irina Khlebko (Russia) Ksenia Polikarpova	19–21, 19–21	(silver) Runner-up
2013	Norwegian International	(Denmark) Julie Finne-Ipsen	(Russia) Olga Golovanova (Russia) Viktoriia Vorobeva	21–14, 24–22	(gold) Winner
2014	Croatian International	(Denmark) Julie Finne-Ipsen	(Denmark) Iben Bergstein (Denmark) Louise Seiersen	15–21, 21–17, 21–19	(gold) Winner
2014	Irish Open	(Denmark) Julie Finne-Ipsen	(Sweden) Emelie Fabbeke (Denmark) Lena Grebak	16–21, 14–21	(silver) Runner-up
2015	Irish Open	(Denmark) Julie Finne-Ipsen	(Bulgaria) Gabriela Stoeva (Bulgaria) Stefani Stoeva	10–21, 24–22, 9–21	(silver) Runner-up
2016	Belgian International	(Denmark) Julie Finne-Ipsen	(England) Chloe Birch (England) Lauren Smith	22–24, 21–18, 18–21	(silver) Runner-up
2016	Norwegian International	(Denmark) Julie Finne-Ipsen	(Denmark) Anne Katrine Hansen (Denmark) Marie Louise Steffensen	21–16, 21–14	(gold) Winner
2016	Irish Open	(Denmark) Julie Finne-Ipsen	(France) Émilie Lefel (France) Anne Tran	22–24, 18–21	(silver) Runner-up

Mixed doubles
Year	Tournament	Partner	Opponent	Score	Result
2013	Croatian International	(Denmark) Niclas Nøhr	(Denmark) Frederik Colberg (Denmark) Sara Thygesen	12–21, 21–12, 21–9	(gold) Winner
2013	Norwegian International	(Denmark) Alexander Bond	(Russia) Vasily Kuznetsov (Russia) Viktoriia Vorobeva	19–21, 7–21	(silver) Runner-up
2019	Finnish Open	(Denmark) Mathias Bay-Smidt	(Indonesia) Rehan Naufal Kusharjanto (Indonesia) Lisa Ayu Kusumawati	20–22, 21–15, 14–21	(silver) Runner-up
2019	Spanish International	(Denmark) Mathias Bay-Smidt	(England) Ben Lane (England) Jessica Pugh	13–21, 26–24, 18–21	(silver) Runner-up
2019	Scottish Open	(Denmark) Mathias Bay-Smidt	(Denmark) Mathias Christiansen (Denmark) Alexandra Bøje	21–23, 16–21	(silver) Runner-up
2021	Dutch Open	(Denmark) Mikkel Mikkelsen	(Netherlands) Robin Tabeling (Netherlands) Selena Piek	21–18, 13–21, 21–15	(gold) Winner
2021	Irish Open	(Denmark) Mikkel Mikkelsen	(Netherlands) Robin Tabeling (Netherlands) Selena Piek	18–21, 15–21	(silver) Runner-up
2023	Belgian International	(Denmark) Mikkel Mikkelsen	(England) Marcus Ellis (England) Lauren Smith	18–21, 15–21	(silver) Runner-up

BWF International Challenge tournament
BWF International Series tournament
BWF Future Series tournament
