= Annika Horbach =

German badminton player (born 1994)

Personal information
- Born: 18 January 1994 (age 32)
- Height: 1.69 m (5 ft 7 in)

Sport
- Country: Germany
- Sport: Badminton

Women's
- Highest ranking: 272 (WS) 6 Nov 2014; 192 (WD) 11 Jun 2015; 127 (XD) 17 Jul 2014
- BWF profile

Annika Horbach (born 18 January 1994) is a German female badminton player.

== Achievements ==
=== BWF International Challenge/Series ===
Women's Doubles
Year	Tournament	Partner	Opponent	Score	Result
2014	Mauritius International	(New Zealand) Maria Mata Masinipeni	(Mauritius) Kate Foo Kune (Mauritius) Yeldy Louison	21-12, 21–12	(gold) Winner

Mixed Doubles
Year	Tournament	Partner	Opponent	Score	Result
2014	Mauritius International	(Germany) Andreas Heinz	(South Africa) Andries Malan (South Africa) Jennifer Fry	15-21, 21–18, 21–16	(gold) Winner

BWF International Challenge tournament
BWF International Series tournament
BWF Future Series tournament
