= Julie Finne-Ipsen =

Danish badminton player (born 1995)

Personal information
- Born: 22 January 1995 (age 31) Ballerup, Denmark

Sport
- Country: Denmark
- Sport: Badminton

Women's singles and doubles
- Highest ranking: 65 (WS, 22 June 2017); 25 (WD with Rikke Søby Hansen, 15 June 2017); 165 (XD with Daniel Lundgaard, 17 March 2020)
- BWF profile
Medal record
Women's badminton
Representing Denmark
European Women's Team Championships
Gold medal – first place	2014 Basel	Women's team
Gold medal – first place	2016 Kazan	Women's team
Gold medal – first place	2018 Kazan	Women's team
European Junior Championships
Gold medal – first place	2013 Ankara	Mixed team
Silver medal – second place	2013 Ankara	Girls' doubles
Bronze medal – third place	2011 Vantaa	Mixed team
Bronze medal – third place	2013 Ankara	Mixed doubles

Julie Finne-Ipsen (born 22 January 1995) is a Danish badminton player from the Værløse club. Finne-Ipsen also plays golf for the Danish national team. She started her badminton career at the Ballerup club at aged six. In 2013, she won silver medal in girls' doubles event and bronze medal in mixed doubles event at the European Junior Badminton Championships.

== Achievements ==
=== European Junior Championships ===
Girls' doubles
Year	Venue	Partner	Opponent	Score	Result
2013	Aski Sports Hall; Ankara, Turkey	(Denmark) Rikke Søby Hansen	(Bulgaria) Gabriela Stoeva (Bulgaria) Stefani Stoeva	11–21, 18–21	Silver

Mixed doubles
Year	Venue	Partner	Opponent	Score	Result
2013	Aski Sports Hall; Ankara, Turkey	(Denmark) Kasper Antonsen	(Netherlands) Robin Tabeling (Netherlands) Myke Halkema	21–23, 21–16, 19–21	Bronze

=== BWF World Tour (1 runner-up) ===
The BWF World Tour, which was announced on 19 March 2017 and implemented in 2018, is a series of elite badminton tournaments sanctioned by the Badminton World Federation (BWF). The BWF World Tours are divided into levels of World Tour Finals, Super 1000, Super 750, Super 500, Super 300, and the BWF Tour Super 100.

Women's doubles
Year	Tournament	Level	Partner	Opponent	Score	Result
2023	Abu Dhabi Masters	Super 100	(Denmark) Mai Surrow	(India) Tanisha Crasto (India) Ashwini Ponnappa	16–21, 21–16, 8–21	(silver) Runner-up

=== BWF International Challenge/Series (7 titles, 12 runners-up) ===
Women's doubles
Year	Tournament	Partner	Opponent	Score	Result
2012	Hungarian International	(Denmark) Rikke Søby Hansen	(Germany) Carola Bott (Croatia) Staša Poznanović	17–21, 21–23	(silver) Runner-up
2013	Estonian International	(Denmark) Rikke Søby Hansen	(Russia) Irina Khlebko (Russia) Ksenia Polikarpova	21–15, 19–21, 20–22	(silver) Runner-up
2013	Croatian International	(Denmark) Rikke Søby Hansen	(Russia) Irina Khlebko (Russia) Ksenia Polikarpova	19–21, 19–21	(silver) Runner-up
2013	Norwegian International	(Denmark) Rikke Søby Hansen	(Russia) Olga Golovanova (Russia) Viktoriia Vorobeva	21–14, 24–22	(gold) Winner
2014	Croatian International	(Denmark) Rikke Søby Hansen	(Denmark) Iben Bergstein (Denmark) Louise Seiersen	15–21, 21–17, 21–19	(gold) Winner
2014	Irish Open	(Denmark) Rikke Søby Hansen	(Sweden) Emelie Fabbeke (Denmark) Lena Grebak	16–21, 14–21	(silver) Runner-up
2015	Croatian International	(Denmark) Ditte Søby Hansen	(Denmark) Maiken Fruergaard (Denmark) Camilla Martens	16–21, 21–19, 19–21	(silver) Runner-up
2015	Irish Open	(Denmark) Rikke Søby Hansen	(Bulgaria) Gabriela Stoeva (Bulgaria) Stefani Stoeva	10–21, 24–22, 9–21	(silver) Runner-up
2016	Belgian International	(Denmark) Rikke Søby Hansen	(England) Chloe Birch (England) Lauren Smith	22–24, 21–18, 18–21	(silver) Runner-up
2016	Norwegian International	(Denmark) Rikke Søby Hansen	(Denmark) Anne Katrine Hansen (Denmark) Marie Louise Steffensen	21–16, 21–14	(gold) Winner
2016	Irish Open	(Denmark) Rikke Søby Hansen	(France) Émilie Lefel (France) Anne Tran	22–24, 18–21	(silver) Runner-up
2018	Italian International	(Denmark) Mai Surrow	(Russia) Ekaterina Bolotova (Russia) Alina Davletova	13–21, 21–14, 13–21	(silver) Runner-up
2019	Estonian International	(Denmark) Mai Surrow	(Russia) Anastasia Chervyakova (Russia) Olga Morozova	21–12, 17–21, 21–14	(gold) Winner
2019	Portugal International	(Sweden) Clara Nistad	(Chinese Taipei) Chang Ching-hui (Chinese Taipei) Yang Ching-tun	21–11, 21–15	(gold) Winner
2019	Scottish Open	(Denmark) Mai Surrow	(Denmark) Amalie Magelund (Denmark) Freja Ravn	21–17, 15–21, 6–21	(silver) Runner-up
2020	Swedish Open	(Denmark) Mai Surrow	(France) Vimala Hériau (France) Margot Lambert	22–20, 22–20	(gold) Winner
2022	Austrian Open	(Denmark) Mai Surrow	(Chinese Taipei) Lee Chia-hsin (Chinese Taipei) Teng Chun-hsun	19–21, 21–15, 10–21	(silver) Runner-up
2022	Nantes International	(Denmark) Mai Surrow	(Chinese Taipei) Hsu Ya-ching (Chinese Taipei) Lin Wan-ching	24–22, 21–17	(gold) Winner
2023	Dutch Open	(Denmark) Mai Surrow	(Netherlands) Debora Jille (Netherlands) Cheryl Seinen	9–21, 13–21	(silver) Runner-up

BWF International Challenge tournament
BWF International Series tournament
BWF Future Series tournament
