= Bastian Kersaudy =

French badminton player (born 1994)

Personal information
- Born: 9 June 1994 (age 32) Rennes, France
- Height: 1.92 m (6 ft 4 in)
- Weight: 83 kg (183 lb)

Sport
- Country: France
- Sport: Badminton
- Handedness: Right

Men's & mixed doubles
- Highest ranking: 44 (MD 12 March 2015); 33 (XD 28 June 2018)
- BWF profile
Medal record
Men's badminton
Representing France
European Men's Team Championships
Silver medal – second place	2016 Kazan	Men's team
Bronze medal – third place	2018 Kazan	Men's team
Mediterranean Games
Gold medal – first place	2018 Tarragona	Men's doubles
European Junior Championships
Silver medal – second place	2013 Ankara	Mixed team

Bastian Kersaudy (born 9 June 1994) is a French badminton player from the Chambly Oise club. He has won some international tournament includes, the 2014 Brazil International in the men's doubles event partnered with Gaetan Mittelheisser, the 2015 Slovenia International in the mixed doubles event partnered with Léa Palermo, and at the 2017 Estonian International tournament in the men's doubles event partnered with Julien Maio.

Kersaudy competed at the 2015 European Games in Baku, Azerbaijan. In 2018, he captured the men's doubles gold medal at the 2018 Mediterranean Games partnered with Thom Gicquel.

== Achievements ==
=== Mediterranean Games ===
Men's doubles
Year	Venue	Partner	Opponent	Score	Result
2018	El Morell Pavilion; Tarragona, Spain	(France) Thom Gicquel	(Turkey) Serdar Koca (Turkey) Serhat Salim	21–9, 21–19	Gold

=== BWF International Challenge/Series (3 titles, 8 runners-up) ===
Men's doubles
Year	Tournament	Partner	Opponent	Score	Result
2014	Romanian International	(France) Gaëtan Mittelheisser	(Croatia) Zvonimir Đurkinjak (Croatia) Zvonimir Hölbling	12–21, 13–21	(silver) Runner-up
2014	Orleans International	(France) Gaëtan Mittelheisser	(Poland) Adam Cwalina (Poland) Przemysław Wacha	21–13, 17–21, 18–21	(silver) Runner-up
2014	Brazil International	(France) Gaëtan Mittelheisser	(France) Laurent Constantin (France) Matthieu Lo Ying Ping	11–9, 9–11, 11–7, 11–5	(gold) Winner
2016	White Nights	(France) Julien Maio	(Germany) Jones Ralfy Jansen (Germany) Josche Zurwonne	15–21, 14–21	(silver) Runner-up
2017	Estonian International	(France) Julien Maio	(Finland) Henri Aarnio (Finland) Iikka Heino	21–13, 21–14	(gold) Winner
2019	Swedish Open	(France) Julien Maio	(Denmark) Mathias Bay-Smidt (Denmark) Lasse Mølhede	12–21, 15–21	(silver) Runner-up

Mixed doubles
Year	Tournament	Partner	Opponent	Score	Result
2013	Estonian International	(France) Anne Tran	(Finland) Anton Kaisti (Finland) Jenny Nyström	18–21, 10–21	(silver) Runner-up
2014	Romanian International	(France) Teshana Vignes Waran	(Scotland) Martin Campbell (Scotland) Jillie Cooper	14–21, 15–21	(silver) Runner-up
2015	Slovenia International	(France) Léa Palermo	(France) Marin Baumann (France) Lorraine Baumann	21–17, 18–21, 21–16	(gold) Winner
2016	Estonian International	(France) Léa Palermo	(Russia) Alexandr Zinchenko (Russia) Olga Morozova	18–21, 18–21	(silver) Runner-up
2017	Czech Open	(France) Léa Palermo	(Denmark) Mathias Bay-Smidt (Denmark) Alexandra Boje	21–12, 8–21, 18–21	(silver) Runner-up

BWF International Challenge tournament
BWF International Series tournament
BWF Future Series tournament
