= Anne Tran =

French badminton player (born 1996)

Personal information
- Born: 27 April 1996 (age 30) Neuilly-Sur-Seine, France
- Height: 1.66 m (5 ft 5 in)
- Weight: 60 kg (132 lb)

Sport
- Country: France
- Sport: Badminton
- Handedness: Right

Women's & mixed doubles
- Highest ranking: 13 (WD with Margot Lambert, 27 August 2024); 18 (WD with Émilie Lefel, 19 March 2019); 33 (XD with William Villeger, 17 January 2023)
- BWF profile
Medal record
Women's badminton
Representing France
European Games
Bronze medal – third place	2019 Minsk	Women's doubles
Bronze medal – third place	2023 Kraków–Małopolska	Women's doubles
European Championships
Gold medal – first place	2024 Saarbrücken	Women's doubles
Silver medal – second place	2018 Huelva	Women's doubles
European Women's Team Championships
Bronze medal – third place	2020 Liévin	Women's team
Bronze medal – third place	2024 Łódź	Women's team
European Mixed Team Championships
Silver medal – second place	2021 Vantaa	Mixed team
Silver medal – second place	2023 Aire-sur-la-Lys	Mixed team
European Junior Championships
Silver medal – second place	2013 Ankara	Mixed team
Silver medal – second place	2015 Lubin	Girls' doubles
Bronze medal – third place	2015 Lubin	Mixed doubles
Bronze medal – third place	2015 Lubin	Mixed team

Anne Tran (born 27 April 1996) is a French badminton player. Tran was the women's doubles champion at the 2013 and 2017 French National Championships. She was part of the French junior team that won the silver medal at the 2013 European Junior Championships, and in 2015 she won the silver medal in the girls' doubles, also bronze medals in the mixed doubles and team events. Tran clinched the silver medal at the 2018 European Championships in the women's doubles event partnered with Émilie Lefel, making them as the first French women's doubles players won a medal at that category.

Tran and Margot Lambert competed for France at the 2024 Summer Olympics in the women's doubles event.

== Achievements ==
=== European Games ===
Women's doubles
Year	Venue	Partner	Opponent	Score	Result
2019	Falcon Club; Minsk, Belarus	(France) Émilie Lefel	(United Kingdom) Chloe Birch (United Kingdom) Lauren Smith	13–21, 13–21	Bronze
2023	Arena Jaskółka; Tarnów, Poland	(France) Margot Lambert	(Bulgaria) Gabriela Stoeva (Bulgaria) Stefani Stoeva	21–17, 14–21, 12–21	Bronze

=== European Championships ===
Women's doubles
Year	Venue	Partner	Opponent	Score	Result
2018	Palacio de los Deportes Carolina Marín; Huelva, Spain	(France) Émilie Lefel	(Bulgaria) Gabriela Stoeva (Bulgaria) Stefani Stoeva	12–21, 10–21	Silver
2024	Saarlandhalle; Saarbrücken, Germany	(France) Margot Lambert	(Bulgaria) Gabriela Stoeva (Bulgaria) Stefani Stoeva	16–21, 21–17, 21–11	Gold

=== European Junior Championships ===
Girls' doubles
Year	Venue	Partner	Opponent	Score	Result
2015	Regional Sport Centrum Hall; Lubin, Poland	(France) Verlaine Faulmann	(Denmark) Julie Dawall Jakobsen (Denmark) Ditte Søby Hansen	18–21, 19–21	Silver

Mixed doubles
Year	Venue	Partner	Opponent	Score	Result
2015	Regional Sport Centrum Hall; Lubin, Poland	(France) Alexandre Hammer	(Germany) Max Weißkirchen (Germany) Eva Janssens	19–21, 12–21	Bronze

=== BWF World Tour (2 runners-up) ===
The BWF World Tour, which was announced on 19 March 2017 and implemented in 2018, is a series of elite badminton tournaments sanctioned by the Badminton World Federation (BWF). The BWF World Tour is divided into levels of World Tour Finals, Super 1000, Super 750, Super 500, Super 300 (part of the HSBC World Tour), and the BWF Tour Super 100.

Women's doubles
Year	Tournament	Level	Partner	Opponent	Score	Result
2018	Scottish Open	Super 100	(France) Émilie Lefel	(Bulgaria) Gabriela Stoeva (Bulgaria) Stefani Stoeva	16–21, 9–21	(silver) Runner-up

Mixed doubles
Year	Tournament	Level	Partner	Opponent	Score	Result
2019	Orléans Masters	Super 100	(France) Ronan Labar	(France) Thom Gicquel (France) Delphine Delrue	11–21, 14–21	(silver) Runner-up

=== BWF International Challenge/Series (11 titles, 8 runners-up) ===
Women's doubles
Year	Tournament	Partner	Opponent	Score	Result
2015	Romanian International	(France) Léa Palermo	(England) Chloe Birch (England) Jenny Wallwork	6–11, 12–14, 11–8, 8–11	(silver) Runner-up
2015	Eurasia Bulgaria International	(France) Marie Batomene	(Vietnam) Lê Thu Huyền (Vietnam) Phạm Như Thảo	16–21, 9–21	(silver) Runner-up
2016	Irish Open	(France) Émilie Lefel	(Denmark) Julie Finne-Ipsen (Denmark) Rikke Søby Hansen	24–22, 21–18	(gold) Winner
2017	Irish Open	(France) Émilie Lefel	(England) Jenny Moore (England) Victoria Williams	21–16, 21–12	(gold) Winner
2018	Czech Open	(France) Émilie Lefel	(England) Chloe Birch (England) Lauren Smith	14–21, 14–21	(silver) Runner-up
2019	Brazil International	(France) Émilie Lefel	(Canada) Rachel Honderich (Canada) Kristen Tsai	18–21, 21–17, 19–21	(silver) Runner-up
2019	Spanish International	(France) Émilie Lefel	(Bulgaria) Gabriela Stoeva (Bulgaria) Stefani Stoeva	8–21, 10–21	(silver) Runner-up
2021	Polish International	(France) Margot Lambert	(India) Treesa Jolly (India) Gayathri Gopichand	21–10, 21–18	(gold) Winner
2021	Welsh International	(France) Margot Lambert	(India) Treesa Jolly (India) Gayathri Gopichand	22–20, 17–21, 21–14	(gold) Winner
2022	Welsh International	(France) Margot Lambert	(England) Chloe Birch (England) Lauren Smith	9–21, 21–14, 21–9	(gold) Winner
2023	Réunion Open	(France) Margot Lambert	(Japan) Natsumi Takasaki (Japan) Mai Tanabe	14–21, 21–14, 21–10	(gold) Winner
2025	Austrian Open	(France) Elsa Jacob	(Chinese Taipei) Lin Chih-chun (Chinese Taipei) Lin Wan-ching	21–16, 21–14	(gold) Winner

Mixed doubles
Year	Tournament	Partner	Opponent	Score	Result
2013	Estonian International	(France) Bastian Kersaudy	(Finland) Anton Kaisti (Finland) Jenny Nyström	18–21, 10–21	(silver) Runner-up
2015	Peru International	(France) Baptiste Carême	(France) Ronan Labar (France) Émilie Lefel	18–21, 21–13, 14–21	(silver) Runner-up
2016	Italian International	(France) Jordan Corvée	(Chinese Taipei) Chang Ko-chi (Chinese Taipei) Chang Hsin-tien	21–13, 17–21, 21–17	(gold) Winner
2019	Denmark International	(France) Ronan Labar	(France) Thom Gicquel (France) Delphine Delrue	19–21, 21–18, 21–15	(gold) Winner
2019	Irish Open	(France) Ronan Labar	(Denmark) Mathias Christiansen (Denmark) Alexandra Bøje	12–21, 19–21	(silver) Runner-up
2021	Polish International	(France) William Villeger	(Poland) Paweł Śmiłowski (Poland) Wiktoria Adamek	21–15, 21–17	(gold) Winner
2021	Welsh International	(France) William Villeger	(England) Callum Hemming (England) Jessica Pugh	21–15, 17–21, 21–16	(gold) Winner

BWF International Challenge tournament
BWF International Series tournament
BWF Future Series tournament
