= Léa Palermo =

French badminton player

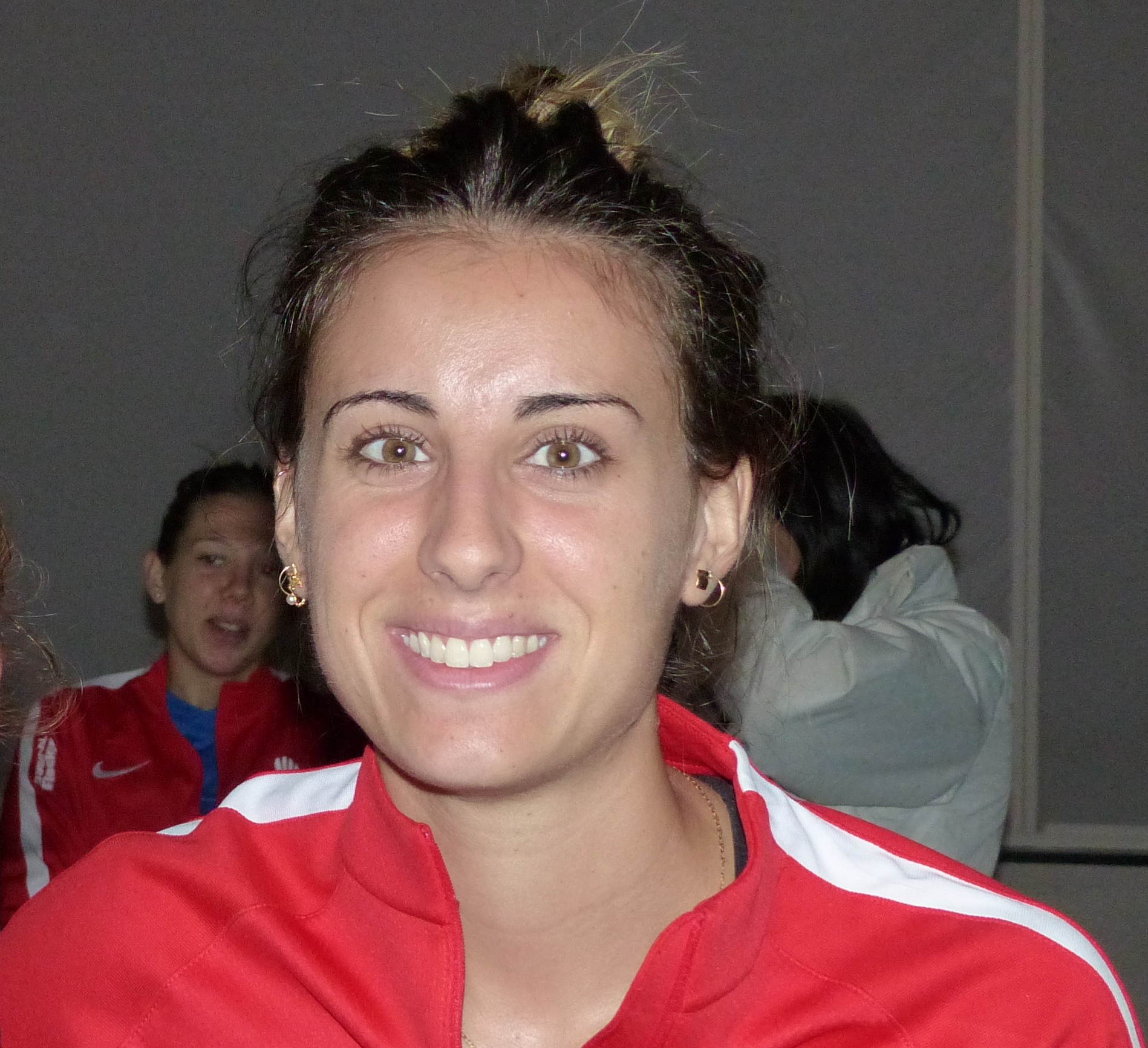
- Palermo in 2017

Personal information
- Born: 7 July 1993 (age 33) Saint-Martin-d'Hères, France
- Years active: 2008–present
- Height: 1.73 m (5 ft 8 in)

Sport
- Country: France
- Sport: Badminton
- Handedness: Right

Women's & mixed doubles
- Highest ranking: 27 (WD with Delphine Delrue, 5 March 2019); 31 (XD with Julien Maio, 27 October 2026); 33 (XD with Bastian Kersaudy, 28 June 2018)
- Current ranking: 34 (XD with Julien Maio, 3 November 2026)
- BWF profile
Medal record
Women's badminton
Representing France
European Championships
| Bronze medal – third place | 2025 Horsens | Mixed doubles |
European Women's Team Championships
| Bronze medal – third place | 2020 Liévin | Women's team |
European Mixed Team Championships
| Silver medal – second place | 2021 Vantaa | Mixed team |
| Silver medal – second place | 2025 Baku | Mixed team |
Mediterranean Games
| Gold medal – first place | 2018 Tarragona | Women's doubles |

Léa Palermo (born 7 July 1993) is a French badminton player. She started playing badminton at aged 8, then joined the France national badminton team in 2006. In 2009, she won the bronze medal at the European U17 Badminton Championships in the mixed doubles event. In 2010, she competed at the Summer Youth Olympic Games in Singapore. In 2015, she won the Slovenia International tournament in the mixed doubles event partnered with Bastian Kersaudy. In 2016, she won French National Badminton Championships in women's doubles event. She also the runner-up at the Orleans International in the women's doubles event and at the Estonian International in the mixed doubles event. In 2017, she became the runner-up at the Estonian International partnered with Delphine Delrue. She competed at the 2018 Mediterranean Games, clinched the women's doubles gold with Delrue.

== Achievements ==
=== European Championships ===
Mixed doubles
| Year | Venue | Partner | Opponent | Score | Result |
|---|---|---|---|---|---|
| 2025 | Forum, Horsens, Denmark | (France) Julien Maio | (Denmark) Jesper Toft (Denmark) Amalie Magelund | 14–21, 13–21 | Bronze |

=== Mediterranean Games ===
Women's doubles
| Year | Venue | Partner | Opponent | Score | Result |
|---|---|---|---|---|---|
| 2018 | El Morell Pavilion, Tarragona, Spain | (France) Delphine Delrue | (Turkey) Bengisu Erçetin (Turkey) Nazlıcan İnci | 21–17, 21–16 | Gold |

=== BWF World Tour (1 runner-up) ===
The BWF World Tour, which was announced on 19 March 2017 and implemented in 2018, is a series of elite badminton tournaments sanctioned by the Badminton World Federation (BWF). The BWF World Tours are divided into levels of World Tour Finals, Super 1000, Super 750, Super 500, Super 300 (part of the HSBC World Tour), and the BWF Tour Super 100.

Women's doubles
| Year | Tournament | Level | Partner | Opponent | Score | Result |
|---|---|---|---|---|---|---|
| 2018 | Orleans Masters | Super 100 | (France) Delphine Delrue | (Bulgaria) Gabriela Stoeva (Bulgaria) Stefani Stoeva | 8–21, 14–21 | (silver) Runner-up |

=== BWF International Challenge/Series (6 titles, 8 runners-up) ===
Women's doubles
| Year | Tournament | Partner | Opponent | Score | Result |
|---|---|---|---|---|---|
| 2015 | Romanian International | (France) Anne Tran | (England) Chloe Birch (England) Jenny Wallwork | 6–11, 12–14, 11–8, 8–11 | (silver) Runner-up |
| 2016 | Orleans International | (France) Delphine Delrue | (England) Heather Olver (England) Lauren Smith | 19–21, 8–21 | (silver) Runner-up |
| 2017 | Estonian International | (France) Delphine Delrue | (Bulgaria) Mariya Mitsova (Bulgaria) Petya Nedelcheva | 12–21, 16–21 | (silver) Runner-up |
| 2017 | Orleans International | (France) Delphine Delrue | (Japan) Asumi Kugo (Japan) Megumi Yokoyama | 14–21, 21–17, 12–21 | (silver) Runner-up |
| 2017 | White Nights | (France) Delphine Delrue | (Russia) Anastasia Chervyakova (Russia) Olga Morozova | 8–21, 15–21 | (silver) Runner-up |
| 2018 | Spanish International | (France) Delphine Delrue | (Ukraine) Maryna Ilyinskaya (Ukraine) Yelyzaveta Zharka | 21–6, 21–12 | (gold) Winner |
| 2018 | Belgian International | (France) Delphine Delrue | (Japan) Mizuki Fujii (Japan) Nao Ono | 21–19, 21–14 | (gold) Winner |
| 2019 | Irish Open | (France) Delphine Delrue | (Denmark) Amalie Magelund (Denmark) Freja Ravn | 18–21, 11–21 | (silver) Runner-up |

Mixed doubles
| Year | Tournament | Partner | Opponent | Score | Result |
|---|---|---|---|---|---|
| 2015 | Slovenia International | (France) Bastian Kersaudy | (France) Marin Baumann (France) Lorraine Baumann | 21–17, 18–21, 21–16 | (gold) Winner |
| 2016 | Estonian International | (France) Bastian Kersaudy | (Russia) Alexandr Zinchenko (Russia) Olga Morozova | 18–21, 18–21 | (silver) Runner-up |
| 2017 | Czech Open | (France) Bastian Kersaudy | (Denmark) Mathias Bay-Smidt (Denmark) Alexandra Bøje | 21–12, 8–21, 18–21 | (silver) Runner-up |
| 2024 | Réunion Open | (France) Julien Maio | (France) William Villeger (France) Flavie Vallet | 23–21, 21–12 | (gold) Winner |
| 2024 | Mauritius International | (France) Julien Maio | (France) William Villeger (France) Flavie Vallet | 21–11, 21–14 | (gold) Winner |
| 2024 | Turkey International | (France) Julien Maio | (India) Rohan Kapoor (India) Gadde Ruthvika Shivani | 21–15, 21–13 | (gold) Winner |

BWF International Challenge tournament
BWF International Series tournament
BWF Future Series tournament
