= ASKI Sport Hall =

Indoor arena in Ankara, Turkey

Coordinates: 40°0′26″N 32°46′12″E

ASKI Sport Hall (Turkish: ASKİ Spor Salonu) is an indoor arena located in Ankara, Turkey. With a seating capacity for 6,000 people, the arena hosted the 2008 Turkish basketball cup final eight in which local Türk Telekom B.K. won the trophy, and hosts high attendance matches of the team that regularly plays at Atatürk Sport Hall.
