= 2021 All England Open =

2021 badminton tournament in Birmingham

Tournament details
- Dates: 17–21 March
- Edition: 111th
- Level: Super 1000
- Total prize money: US$850,000
- Venue: Utilita Arena Birmingham
- Location: Birmingham, England

Champions
- Men's singles: (Malaysia) Lee Zii Jia
- Women's singles: (Japan) Nozomi Okuhara
- Men's doubles: (Japan) Hiroyuki Endo (Japan) Yuta Watanabe
- Women's doubles: (Japan) Mayu Matsumoto (Japan) Wakana Nagahara
- Mixed doubles: (Japan) Yuta Watanabe (Japan) Arisa Higashino

The 2021 All England Open (officially known as the Yonex All England Open Badminton Championships 2021 for sponsorship reasons) was a badminton tournament which took place at Utilita Arena Birmingham in England from 17 to 21 March 2021. It had a total purse of $850,000.

== Tournament ==
The 2021 All England Open became the second tournament of the 2021 BWF World Tour following the postponement of the 2021 German Open due to the ongoing pandemic. It was part of the All England Open championships, which had been held since 1899. This tournament was organized by Badminton England and sanctioned by the BWF.

=== Venue ===
This tournament was held at Utilita Arena Birmingham in Birmingham, England.

=== Point distribution ===
Below is the point distribution for each phase of the tournament based on the BWF points system for the BWF World Tour Super 1000 event. This tournament would not be calculated in qualification ranking of 2020 Summer Olympics.

Winner	Runner-up	3/4	5/8	9/16	17/32
12,000	10,200	8,400	6,600	4,800	3,000

=== Prize money ===
The total prize money for this tournament was US$850,000. Distribution of prize money was in accordance with BWF regulations.

Event	Winner	Finals	Semi-finals	Quarter-finals	Last 16	Last 32
Singles	$59,500	$28,900	$11,900	$4,675	$2,550	$850
Doubles	$62,900	$29,750	$11,900	$5,312.50	$2,762.50	$850

== Controversies ==
On 17 March 2021 night local time, BWF stated that all Indonesian players competing in the tournament, including all three who had won in the first round, were withdrawn from the tournament after 20 of 24 people from the team were contacted by the NHS Test and Trace service via e-mail, and were required to enter 10-day isolation. They were contacted by the NHS after someone on the same inbound flight from Istanbul to Birmingham with the team was tested positive for COVID-19. The entire team was forced to walk on foot from the arena to the hotel as their shuttle service was prevented from taking them to the hotel.

This sparked controversy between Indonesian players and the BWF. The Indonesians protested because 3 Indian players who are tested positive before the tournament, though 24 hours later tested negative after self testing, were allowed to play on the tournament, while all of Indonesian team members had tested negative for the virus. The start of the tournament itself had been delayed for five hours after 7 of COVID-19 results were deemed inconclusive. The Badminton Association of Indonesia (PBSI) also stated that Turkish badminton player Neslihan Yiğit and her trainer who were on the same flight with the Indonesian team from Istanbul to Birmingham, but Yiğit was allowed to continue her tournament. On 18 March noon local time, Yiğit was announced to have also been withdrawn from the tournament by the BWF.

Earlier, the first round of the men's doubles between Indonesians Mohammad Ahsan and Hendra Setiawan and English pair Ben Lane and Sean Vendy sparked backlashes because of an arrangement where the service judge on duty, Alan Crow, was also English. However, according to the rules, BWF never explicitly prohibits a technical official to officiate a match involving athletes from the same country with the technical official against athletes from another country.

Indonesian National Olympic Committee also alleged unprofessional and discriminatory treatment by BWF, as Indonesian team are not allowed to use lifts and take the bus by the organizers. On 22 March, the president of BWF Poul-Erik Høyer Larsen officially apologizes to Indonesian Youth and Sports Minister for the circumstances faced by Indonesian team during the event.

== Men's singles ==
=== Seeds ===
1. (Japan) Kento Momota (quarter-finals)
2. (Denmark) Viktor Axelsen (final)
3. (Denmark) Anders Antonsen (semi-finals)
4. (Indonesia) Anthony Sinisuka Ginting (first round)
5. (Indonesia) Jonatan Christie (second round)
6. (Malaysia) Lee Zii Jia (champion)
7. (Denmark) Rasmus Gemke (second round)
8. (India) Srikanth Kidambi (first round)

=== Finals ===
Semi-finals
6	(Malaysia) Lee Zii Jia	21	21
(Netherlands) Mark Caljouw	13	17
3	(Denmark) Anders Antonsen	21	7	17
2	(Denmark) Viktor Axelsen	16	21	21

Final
6	(Malaysia) Lee Zii Jia	30	20	21
2	(Denmark) Viktor Axelsen	29	22	9

=== Top half ===
==== Section 1 ====
First Round
1	(Japan) K Momota	21	22
(India) Parupalli K	13	20
(Malaysia) Liew D	10	10
(India) Prannoy K	21	21
6	(Malaysia) Lee Z J	21	21
(Canada) B Yang	13	10
(Denmark) H-K Vittinghus	21	21
(Israel) M Zilberman	16	19

Second Round
1	(Japan) K Momota	21	21
(India) Prannoy K	15	14
6	(Malaysia) Lee Z J	21	21
(Denmark) H-K Vittinghus	12	13

Quarter-finals
1	(Japan) K Momota	16	19
6	(Malaysia) Lee Z J	21	21

==== Section 2 ====
First Round
4	(Indonesia) A S Ginting
(France) T Rouxel	w	/	o
(India) L Sen	21	21
(Thailand) K Wangcharoen	18	12
8	(India) S Kidambi	11	21	12
PFR	(Republic of Ireland) N Nguyen	21	15	21
(Netherlands) M Caljouw	21	21
(Thailand) K Phetpradab	7	7

Second Round
(France) T Rouxel	18	17
(India) L Sen	21	21
PFR	(Republic of Ireland) N Nguyen	18	7
(Netherlands) M Caljouw	21	21

Quarter-finals
(India) L Sen	17	21	17
(Netherlands) M Caljouw	21	16	21

=== Bottom half ===
==== Section 3 ====
First Round
(Japan) K Tsuneyama	21	21
(England) T Penty	17	14
(Japan) K Nishimoto	13	14
7	(Denmark) R Gemke	21	21
(Brazil) Y Coelho	11	19
(India) S Verma	21	21
(France) B Leverdez	14	18
3	(Denmark) A Antonsen	21	21

Second Round
(Japan) K Tsuneyama	21	18	21
7	(Denmark) R Gemke	15	21	14
(India) S Verma	20	10
3	(Denmark) A Antonsen	22	21

Quarter-finals
(Japan) K Tsuneyama	16	21	11
3	(Denmark) A Antonsen	21	9	21

==== Section 4 ====
First Round
(Spain) P Abián	15	12
(Thailand) S Thammasin	21	21
(Thailand) K Vitidsarn	13	22
5	(Indonesia) J Christie	21	24
(India) B. Sai Praneeth	21	22
(France) T J Popov	18	20
(Japan) K Watanabe	21	19	19
2	(Denmark) V Axelsen	13	21	21

Second Round
(Thailand) S Thammasin	w	/	o
5	(Indonesia) J Christie
(India) B. Sai Praneeth	21	12	12
2	(Denmark) V Axelsen	15	21	21

Quarter-finals
(Thailand) S Thammasin	4	15
2	(Denmark) V Axelsen	21	21

== Women's singles ==
=== Seeds ===
1. (Spain) Carolina Marín (withdrew)
2. (Japan) Nozomi Okuhara (champion)
3. (Japan) Akane Yamaguchi (quarter-finals)
4. (Thailand) Ratchanok Intanon (semi-finals)
5. (India) P. V. Sindhu (semi-finals)
6. (Thailand) Pornpawee Chochuwong (final)
7. (Denmark) Mia Blichfeldt (quarter-finals)
8. (Thailand) Busanan Ongbamrungphan (quarter-finals)

=== Finals ===
Semi-finals
6	(Thailand) Pornpawee Chochuwong	21	21
5	(India) P. V. Sindhu	17	9
4	(Thailand) Ratchanok Intanon	21	16	19
2	(Japan) Nozomi Okuhara	16	21	21

Final
6	(Thailand) Pornpawee Chochuwong	12	16
2	(Japan) Nozomi Okuhara	21	21

=== Top half ===
==== Section 1 ====
First Round
PFR	(Bulgaria) M Mitsova	11	7
(Thailand) S Katethong	21	21
(United States) BW Zhang	21	19	21
(Wales) J Hart	10	21	12
6	(Thailand) P Chochuwong	21	21
(Israel) K Polikarpova	10	9
(Thailand) P Chaiwan	21	21
(Belgium) L Tan	9	15

Second Round
(Thailand) S Katethong	21	13	9
(United States) BW Zhang	7	21	21
6	(Thailand) P Chochuwong	21	21
(Thailand) P Chaiwan	17	11

Quarter-finals
(United States) BW Zhang	16	19
6	(Thailand) P Chochuwong	21	21

==== Section 2 ====
First Round
3	(Japan) A Yamaguchi	21	21
(France) Qi XF	17	13
(Turkey) N Yiğit	13	21	21
(France) M Batomene	21	19	17
5	(India) P. V. Sindhu	21	21
(Malaysia) S Cheah S Y	11	17
(Denmark) L Christophersen	21	21
PFR	(Slovakia) M Repiská	12	11

Second Round
3	(Japan) A Yamaguchi	w	/	o
(Turkey) N Yiğit
5	(India) P. V. Sindhu	21	21
(Denmark) L Christophersen	8	8

Quarter-finals
3	(Japan) A Yamaguchi	21	16	19
5	(India) P. V. Sindhu	16	21	21

=== Bottom half ===
==== Section 3 ====
First Round
(Germany) Y Li	21	21
(Scotland) K Gilmour	7	18
(India) S Nehwal	8	4^{r}
7	(Denmark) M Blichfeldt	21	10
PFR	(Thailand) B Aimsaard	21	16	6
(United States) I Wang	15	21	21
(Estonia) K Kuuba	14	16
4	(Thailand) R Intanon	21	21

Second Round
(Germany) Y Li	16	17
7	(Denmark) M Blichfeldt	21	21
(United States) I Wang	14	13
4	(Thailand) R Intanon	21	21

Quarter-finals
7	(Denmark) M Blichfeldt	21	17	10
4	(Thailand) R Intanon	18	21	21

==== Section 4 ====
First Round
(Japan) A Ohori	21	21
(Denmark) L Kjærsfeldt	16	10
(Malaysia) Kisona S	6	7
8	(Thailand) B Ongbamrungphan	21	21
(Switzerland) S Jaquet	19	9
(Bulgaria) L Zetchiri	21	21
(Denmark) J D Jakobsen	11	7
2	(Japan) N Okuhara	21	21

Second Round
(Japan) A Ohori	19	15
8	(Thailand) B Ongbamrungphan	21	21
(Bulgaria) L Zetchiri	6	13
2	(Japan) N Okuhara	21	21

Quarter-finals
8	(Thailand) B Ongbamrungphan	21	8	16
2	(Japan) N Okuhara	18	21	21

== Men's doubles ==
=== Seeds ===
1. (Indonesia) Marcus Fernaldi Gideon / Kevin Sanjaya Sukamuljo (second round)
2. (Indonesia) Mohammad Ahsan / Hendra Setiawan (second round)
3. (Japan) Takeshi Kamura / Keigo Sonoda (final)
4. (Japan) Hiroyuki Endo / Yuta Watanabe (champions)
5. (Indonesia) Fajar Alfian / Muhammad Rian Ardianto (withdrew)
6. (India) Satwiksairaj Rankireddy / Chirag Shetty (second round)
7. (Malaysia) Goh V Shem / Tan Wee Kiong (second round)
8. (England) Marcus Ellis / Chris Langridge (quarter-finals)

=== Finals ===
Semi-finals
(Denmark) Kim Astrup (Denmark) Anders Skaarup Rasmussen	18	14
3	(Japan) Takeshi Kamura (Japan) Keigo Sonoda	21	21
4	(Japan) Hiroyuki Endo (Japan) Yuta Watanabe	21	21
(Denmark) Jeppe Bay (Denmark) Lasse Mølhede	13	11

Final
3	(Japan) Takeshi Kamura (Japan) Keigo Sonoda	15	21	11
4	(Japan) Hiroyuki Endo (Japan) Yuta Watanabe	21	17	21

=== Top half ===
==== Section 1 ====
First Round
1	(Indonesia) M F Gideon (Indonesia) K S Sukamuljo	21	19	21
PFR	(England) M Clare (England) E Van Leeuwen	12	21	9
(United States) P Chew (United States) R Chew	17	14
(France) C Popov (France) T J Popov	21	21
6	(India) S Rankireddy (India) C Shetty	21	21
PFR	(England) N Garg (India) A Mayekar	7	10
(Denmark) K Astrup (Denmark) A S Rasmussen	21	21
(Denmark) P I Klindt (Denmark) M Thøgersen	17	15

Second Round
1	(Indonesia) M F Gideon (Indonesia) K S Sukamuljo
(France) C Popov (France) T J Popov	w	/	o
6	(India) S Rankireddy (India) C Shetty	16	21	17
(Denmark) K Astrup (Denmark) A S Rasmussen	21	11	21

Quarter-finals
(France) C Popov (France) T J Popov	10	14
(Denmark) K Astrup (Denmark) A S Rasmussen	21	21

==== Section 2 ====
First Round
3	(Japan) T Kamura (Japan) K Sonoda	21	21
(Denmark) E Lauritzen (Denmark) M Muurholm	13	12
(Japan) A Koga (Japan) T Saito	21	21
(Japan) T Hoki (Japan) Y Kobayashi	15	12
8	(England) M Ellis (England) C Langridge	21	21
(Republic of Ireland) J Magee (Republic of Ireland) P Reynolds	14	13
(Denmark) D Lundgaard (Denmark) M Thyrri	21	18	17
(England) C Hemming (England) S Stallwood	16	21	21

Second Round
3	(Japan) T Kamura (Japan) K Sonoda	21	21
(Japan) A Koga (Japan) T Saito	18	8
8	(England) M Ellis (England) C Langridge	21	21
(England) C Hemming (England) S Stallwood	9	13

Quarter-finals
3	(Japan) T Kamura (Japan) K Sonoda	21	9	21
8	(England) M Ellis (England) C Langridge	19	21	8

=== Bottom half ===
==== Section 3 ====
First Round
(Denmark) M Christiansen (Denmark) N Nøhr	21	21
(Malaysia) Low H Y (Malaysia) Ng E C	16	19
(Germany) M Lamsfuß (Germany) M E Seidel	11	18
7	(Malaysia) Goh V S (Malaysia) Tan W K	21	21
(India) Arjun M.R. (India) D Kapila	13	12
(Malaysia) Ong Y S (Malaysia) Teo E Y	21	21
PFR	(England) R Easton (England) Z Russ	4	9
4	(Japan) H Endo (Japan) Y Watanabe	21	21

Second Round
(Denmark) M Christiansen (Denmark) N Nøhr	21	21
7	(Malaysia) Goh V S (Malaysia) Tan W K	19	18
(Malaysia) Ong Y S (Malaysia) Teo E Y	10	19
4	(Japan) H Endo (Japan) Y Watanabe	21	21

Quarter-finals
(Denmark) M Christiansen (Denmark) N Nøhr	22	19
4	(Japan) H Endo (Japan) Y Watanabe	24	21

==== Section 4 ====
First Round
(Netherlands) R Jille (Netherlands) T van der Lecq	14	20
(Thailand) N Phuangphuapet (Thailand) T Viriyangkura	21	22
(Nigeria) G Olofua (Nigeria) A J Opeyori	w	/	o
5	(Indonesia) F Alfian (Indonesia) M R Ardianto
(Denmark) J Bay (Denmark) L Mølhede	27	21
(Denmark) J Eipe (Denmark) R Kjær	25	11
(England) B Lane (England) S Vendy	18	21	19
2	(Indonesia) M Ahsan (Indonesia) H Setiawan	21	19	21

Second Round
(Thailand) N Phuangphuapet (Thailand) T Viriyangkura	21	17	21
(Nigeria) G Olofua (Nigeria) A J Opeyori	19	21	8
(Denmark) J Bay (Denmark) L Mølhede	w	/	o
2	(Indonesia) M Ahsan (Indonesia) H Setiawan

Quarter-finals
(Thailand) N Phuangphuapet (Thailand) T Viriyangkura	19	12
(Denmark) J Bay (Denmark) L Mølhede	21	21

== Women's doubles ==
=== Seeds ===
1. (Japan) Yuki Fukushima / Sayaka Hirota (final)
2. (Japan) Mayu Matsumoto / Wakana Nagahara (champions)
3. (Indonesia) Greysia Polii / Apriyani Rahayu (withdrew)
4. (Thailand) Jongkolphan Kititharakul / Rawinda Prajongjai (first round)
5. (Japan) Nami Matsuyama / Chiharu Shida (semi-finals)
6. (Bulgaria) Gabriela Stoeva / Stefani Stoeva (second round)
7. (England) Chloe Birch / Lauren Smith (quarter-finals)
8. (Denmark) Maiken Fruergaard / Sara Thygesen (quarter-finals)

=== Finals ===
Semi-finals
1	(Japan) Yuki Fukushima (Japan) Sayaka Hirota	21	21
(Netherlands) Selena Piek (Netherlands) Cheryl Seinen	17	7
5	(Japan) Nami Matsuyama (Japan) Chiharu Shida	19	17
2	(Japan) Mayu Matsumoto (Japan) Wakana Nagahara	21	21

Final
1	(Japan) Yuki Fukushima (Japan) Sayaka Hirota	18	16
2	(Japan) Mayu Matsumoto (Japan) Wakana Nagahara	21	21

=== Top half ===
==== Section 1 ====
First Round
1	(Japan) Y Fukushima (Japan) S Hirota	w	/	o
(Germany) L Efler (Germany) I Herttrich
(Denmark) A Bøje (Denmark) M Poulsen	21	21
(India) M Jakkampudi (India) P S. Ram	10	15
7	(England) C Birch (England) L Smith	21	21
(India) K. A Bhat (India) S Gautam	14	11
(Denmark) I Nielsen (Denmark) M L Steffensen	w	/	o
(Germany) A Jäger (Germany) S Küspert

Second Round
1	(Japan) Y Fukushima (Japan) S Hirota	21	21
(Denmark) A Bøje (Denmark) M Poulsen	7	15
7	(England) C Birch (England) L Smith	21	21
(Denmark) I Nielsen (Denmark) M L Steffensen	14	11

Quarter-finals
1	(Japan) Y Fukushima (Japan) S Hirota	14	21	21
7	(England) C Birch (England) L Smith	21	12	14

==== Section 2 ====
First Round
3	(Indonesia) G Polii (Indonesia) A Rahayu	w	/	o
(Germany) K Ostermeyer (Germany) F Volkmann
(Netherlands) S Piek (Netherlands) C Seinen	22	21
(Sweden) J Magnusson (Sweden) C Nistad	20	12
6	(Bulgaria) G Stoeva (Bulgaria) S Stoeva	w	/	o
(France) V Hériau (France) M Lambert
(Thailand) B Aimsaard (Thailand) N Aimsaard	14	12
(India) A Ponnappa (India) N. S Reddy	21	21

Second Round
3	(Indonesia) G Polii (Indonesia) A Rahayu
(Netherlands) S Piek (Netherlands) C Seinen	w	/	o
6	(Bulgaria) G Stoeva (Bulgaria) S Stoeva	17	10
(India) A Ponnappa (India) N. S Reddy	21	21

Quarter-finals
(Netherlands) S Piek (Netherlands) C Seinen	24	21
(India) A Ponnappa (India) N. S Reddy	22	12

=== Bottom half ===
==== Section 3 ====
First Round
(Estonia) K-K Marran (Estonia) H Rüütel	24	16	21
(Denmark) C Busch (Denmark) A Schulz	22	21	14
(Japan) A Sakuramoto (Japan) Y Takahata	19	21	17
5	(Japan) N Matsuyama (Japan) C Shida	21	16	21
(Malaysia) Teoh M X (Malaysia) Yap L
(England) J Hopton (England) J Moore	w	/	o
(Malaysia) P Tan K L (Malaysia) Thinaah M	21	23
4	(Thailand) J Kititharakul (Thailand) R Prajongjai	17	21

Second Round
(Estonia) K-K Marran (Estonia) H Rüütel	8	12
5	(Japan) N Matsuyama (Japan) C Shida	21	21
(England) J Hopton (England) J Moore	18	7
(Malaysia) P Tan K L (Malaysia) Thinaah M	21	21

Quarter-finals
5	(Japan) N Matsuyama (Japan) C Shida	21	20	21
(Malaysia) P Tan K L (Malaysia) Thinaah M	12	22	16

==== Section 4 ====
First Round
(Egypt) D Hany (Egypt) H Hosny	8	7
(Denmark) A Magelund (Denmark) F Ravn	21	21
(England) A Lado (England) V Williams	11	10
8	(Denmark) M Fruergaard (Denmark) S Thygesen	21	21
(France) É Lefel (France) A Tran	w	/	o
(Scotland) J MacPherson (Scotland) C Torrance
(Denmark) J Finne-Ipsen (Denmark) M Surrow	6	18
2	(Japan) M Matsumoto (Japan) W Nagahara	21	21

Second Round
(Denmark) A Magelund (Denmark) F Ravn	13	10
8	(Denmark) M Fruergaard (Denmark) S Thygesen	21	21
(France) É Lefel (France) A Tran	10	16
2	(Japan) M Matsumoto (Japan) W Nagahara	21	21

Quarter-finals
8	(Denmark) M Fruergaard (Denmark) S Thygesen	14	21	15
2	(Japan) M Matsumoto (Japan) W Nagahara	21	19	21

== Mixed doubles ==
=== Seeds ===
1. (Indonesia) Praveen Jordan / Melati Daeva Oktavianti (withdrew)
2. (Japan) Yuta Watanabe / Arisa Higashino (champions)
3. (Malaysia) Chan Peng Soon / Goh Liu Ying (semi-finals)
4. (England) Marcus Ellis / Lauren Smith (semi-finals)
5. (Malaysia) Goh Soon Huat / Shevon Jemie Lai (first round)
6. (Malaysia) Tan Kian Meng / Lai Pei Jing (quarter-finals)
7. (France) Thom Gicquel / Delphine Delrue (quarter-finals)
8. (England) Chris Adcock / Gabby Adcock (withdrew)

=== Finals ===
Semi-finals
(Japan) Yuki Kaneko (Japan) Misaki Matsutomo	21	22
3	(Malaysia) Chan Peng Soon (Malaysia) Goh Liu Ying	14	20
4	(England) Marcus Ellis (England) Lauren Smith	10	18
2	(Japan) Yuta Watanabe (Japan) Arisa Higashino	21	21

Final
(Japan) Yuki Kaneko (Japan) Misaki Matsutomo	14	13
2	(Japan) Yuta Watanabe (Japan) Arisa Higashino	21	21

=== Top half ===
==== Section 1 ====
First Round
1	(Indonesia) P Jordan (Indonesia) M D Oktavianti
(India) D Kapila (India) M Jakkampudi	w	/	o
(Malaysia) Hoo P R (Malaysia) Cheah Y S	13	14
(Denmark) N Nøhr (Denmark) A Magelund	21	21
5	(Malaysia) Goh S H (Malaysia) S J Lai	19	16
(Republic of Ireland) S Magee (Republic of Ireland) C Magee	21	21
(Japan) Y Kaneko (Japan) M Matsutomo	21	21
(India) S Rankireddy (India) A Ponnappa	19	9

Second Round
(India) D Kapila (India) M Jakkampudi	19	8
(Denmark) N Nøhr (Denmark) A Magelund	21	21
(Republic of Ireland) S Magee (Republic of Ireland) C Magee	16	21	13
(Japan) Y Kaneko (Japan) M Matsutomo	21	19	21

Quarter-finals
(Denmark) N Nøhr (Denmark) A Magelund	15	10
(Japan) Y Kaneko (Japan) M Matsutomo	21	21

==== Section 2 ====
First Round
3	(Malaysia) Chan P S (Malaysia) Goh L Y	21	21	21
(Denmark) M Thyrri (Denmark) M Surrow	23	15	12
(Thailand) N Phuangphuapet (Thailand) B Aimsaard	21	22
(France) E Adam (France) M Lambert	19	20
7	(France) T Gicquel (France) D Delrue	21	21
(England) C Hemming (England) V Williams	10	11
PFR	(England) G Mairs (England) J Moore	13	21	18
(Malaysia) Chen T J (Malaysia) Peck Y W	21	18	21

Second Round
3	(Malaysia) Chan P S (Malaysia) Goh L Y	21	21
(Thailand) N Phuangphuapet (Thailand) B Aimsaard	9	8
7	(France) T Gicquel (France) D Delrue	21	20	21
(Malaysia) Chen T J (Malaysia) Peck Y W	19	22	14

Quarter-finals
3	(Malaysia) Chan P S (Malaysia) Goh L Y	17	21	22
7	(France) T Gicquel (France) D Delrue	21	18	20

=== Bottom half ===
==== Section 3 ====
First Round
(Denmark) J Bay (Denmark) S Lundgaard	13	16
(Denmark) M Mikkelsen (Denmark) R Søby Hansen	21	21
PFR	(Germany) P Scheiel (Germany) F Volkmann	21	21	21
PFR	(Israel) M Zilberman (Israel) S Zilberman	15	23	14
PFR	(Denmark) R Espersen (Denmark) C Busch	21	21
(India) P Chopra (India) N. S Reddy	15	17
PFR	(Republic of Ireland) P Reynolds (Republic of Ireland) R Darragh	12	11
4	(England) M Ellis (England) L Smith	21	21

Second Round
(Denmark) M Mikkelsen (Denmark) R Søby Hansen	21	21
PFR	(Germany) P Scheiel (Germany) F Volkmann	9	19
PFR	(Denmark) R Espersen (Denmark) C Busch	19	13
4	(England) M Ellis (England) L Smith	21	21

Quarter-finals
(Denmark) M Mikkelsen (Denmark) R Søby Hansen	20	19
4	(England) M Ellis (England) L Smith	22	21

==== Section 4 ====
First Round
PFR	(England) S Stallwood (England) A Lado	21	21
(Egypt) A H Elgamal (Egypt) D Hany	10	12
(Japan) T Hoki (Japan) N Matsuyama	13	13
6	(Malaysia) Tan K M (Malaysia) Lai P J	21	21
(Denmark) M Christiansen (Denmark) A Bøje	21	22
(Netherlands) R Tabeling (Netherlands) S Piek	16	20
(France) R Labar (France) A Tran	10	18
2	(Japan) Y Watanabe (Japan) A Higashino	21	21

Second Round
PFR	(England) S Stallwood (England) A Lado	15	15
6	(Malaysia) Tan K M (Malaysia) Lai P J	21	21
(Denmark) M Christiansen (Denmark) A Bøje	16	19
2	(Japan) Y Watanabe (Japan) A Higashino	21	21

Quarter-finals
6	(Malaysia) Tan K M (Malaysia) Lai P J	17	9
2	(Japan) Y Watanabe (Japan) A Higashino	21	21

Preceded by 2021 Swiss Open	BWF World Tour; 2021 BWF season	Succeeded by 2021 Orléans Masters
