= 2020 European Men's Team Badminton Championships knockout stage =

This article lists the full results for knockout stage of 2020 European Men's Team Badminton Championships. All times are Central European Time (UTC+01:00).

== Quarterfinals ==
=== Denmark vs. Germany ===
Denmark
3
Arena Stade Couvert, Court 3
14 February 2020 15:00

Germany
0

			1	2	3
1	(Denmark) (Germany)	Viktor Axelsen; Kai Schäfer	21; 13	21; 14
2	(Denmark) (Germany)	Kim Astrup / Anders Skaarup Rasmussen; Mark Lamsfuß / Marvin Emil Seidel	21; 19	21; 12
3	(Denmark) (Germany)	Anders Antonsen; Max Weißkirchen	21; 18	21; 14
4	(Denmark) (Germany)	Mathias Boe / Mads Conrad-Petersen; Jones Ralfy Jansen / Peter Käsbauer				not played
5	(Denmark) (Germany)	Jan Ø. Jørgensen; Samuel Hsiao				not played

=== Russia vs. Bulgaria ===
Russia
3
Arena Stade Couvert, Court 4
14 February 2020 15:00

Bulgaria
1

			1	2	3
1	(Russia) (Bulgaria)	Vladimir Malkov; Daniel Nikolov	23; 21	21; 13
2	(Russia) (Bulgaria)	Sergey Sirant; Dimitar Yanakiev	21; 23	17; 21
3	(Russia) (Bulgaria)	Georgii Karpov; Stilian Makarski	21; 12	21; 8
4	(Russia) (Bulgaria)	Vladimir Ivanov / Nikita Khakimov; Alex Vlaar / Dimitar Yanakiev	21; 4	21; 9
5	(Russia) (Bulgaria)	Rodion Alimov / Ivan Sozonov; Stilian Makarski / Daniel Nikolov				not played

=== Ukraine vs. France ===
Ukraine
0
Arena Stade Couvert, Court 1
14 February 2020 15:00

France
3

			1	2	3
1	(Ukraine) (France)	Artem Pochtarov; Brice Leverdez	17; 21	21; 23
2	(Ukraine) (France)	Danylo Bosniuk; Toma Junior Popov	12; 21	16; 21
3	(Ukraine) (France)	Valeriy Atrashchenkov / Gennadiy Natarov; Julien Maio / Christo Popov	18; 21	21; 17	20; 22
4	(Ukraine) (France)	Dmytro Zavadsky; Lucas Claerbout				not played
5	(Ukraine) (France)	Danylo Bosniuk / Ivan Druzchenko; Thom Gicquel / Ronan Labar				not played

=== Netherlands vs. England ===
Netherlands
3
Arena Stade Couvert, Court 2
14 February 2020 15:00

England
2

			1	2	3
1	(Netherlands) (England)	Mark Caljouw; Toby Penty	21; 16	21; 11
2	(Netherlands) (England)	Joran Kweekel; Alex Lane	11; 21	21; 9	21; 18
3	(Netherlands) (England)	Finn Achthoven; Harry Huang	6; 21	4; 21
4	(Netherlands) (England)	Jelle Maas / Robin Tabeling; Ben Lane / Sean Vendy	20; 21	11; 21
5	(Netherlands) (England)	Ruben Jille / Ties van der Lecq; Harry Huang / Tom Wolfenden	21; 14	18; 21	21; 12

== Semifinals ==
=== Denmark vs. Russia ===
Denmark
3
Arena Stade Couvert, Court 1
15 February 2020 14:00

Russia
0

			1	2	3
1	(Denmark) (Russia)	Viktor Axelsen; Vladimir Malkov	21; 18	21; 7
2	(Denmark) (Russia)	Kim Astrup / Anders Skaarup Rasmussen; Vladimir Ivanov / Ivan Sozonov	21; 19	21; 15
3	(Denmark) (Russia)	Jan Ø. Jørgensen; Georgii Karpov	22; 20	21; 11
4	(Denmark) (Russia)	Mathias Boe / Mads Conrad-Petersen; Rodion Alimov / Nikita Khakimov				not played
5	(Denmark) (Russia)	Hans-Kristian Vittinghus; Georgii Lebedev				not played

=== France vs. Netherlands ===
France
2
Arena Stade Couvert, Court 1
15 February 2020 16:00

Netherlands
3

			1	2	3
1	(France) (Netherlands)	Brice Leverdez; Mark Caljouw	13; 21	21; 15	19; 21
2	(France) (Netherlands)	Christo Popov; Joran Kweekel	21; 16	21; 13
3	(France) (Netherlands)	Thom Gicquel / Ronan Labar; Jelle Maas / Robin Tabeling	21; 10	11; 21	12; 21
4	(France) (Netherlands)	Arnaud Merklé; Wessel van der Aar	21; 13			retired
5	(France) (Netherlands)	Christo Popov / Toma Junior Popov; Ruben Jille / Ties van der Lecq	15; 21	21; 14	18; 21

== Final ==
=== Denmark vs. Netherlands ===
Denmark
3
Arena Stade Couvert, Court 1
16 February 2020 14:00

Netherlands
0

			1	2	3
1	(Denmark) (Netherlands)	Viktor Axelsen; Mark Caljouw	21; 6	21; 16
2	(Denmark) (Netherlands)	Kim Astrup / Anders Skaarup Rasmussen; Jelle Maas / Robin Tabeling	21; 13	21; 11
3	(Denmark) (Netherlands)	Anders Antonsen; Joran Kweekel	21; 11	21; 14
4	(Denmark) (Netherlands)	Mathias Boe / Mads Conrad-Petersen; Ruben Jille / Ties van der Lecq				not played
5	(Denmark) (Netherlands)	Jan Ø. Jørgensen; Wessel van der Aar				not played
