= 2021 Orléans Masters =

2021 badminton tournament in France

Tournament details
- Dates: 23–28 March
- Level: Super 100
- Competitors: 346 from 29 nations
- Total prize money: US$75,000
- Venue: Palais des Sports
- Location: Orléans, France

Champions
- Men's singles: (France) Toma Junior Popov
- Women's singles: (Thailand) Busanan Ongbamrungphan
- Men's doubles: (England) Ben Lane (England) Sean Vendy
- Women's doubles: (Thailand) Jongkolphan Kititharakul (Thailand) Rawinda Prajongjai
- Mixed doubles: (Denmark) Mathias Christiansen (Denmark) Alexandra Bøje

The 2021 Orléans Masters was a badminton tournament which took place at Palais des Sports in France from 23 to 28 March 2021 and had a total purse of $75,000.

== Tournament ==
The 2021 Orléans Masters was the first Super 100 tournament of the 2021 BWF World Tour and also part of the Orléans Masters championships, which had been held since 2012. This tournament was organized by the Cercle Laïque des Tourelles Orléans (CLTO) Badminton and sanctioned by the BWF.

=== Venue ===
This international tournament was held at Palais des Sports in Orléans, Centre-Val de Loire, France.

=== Point distribution ===
Below is the point distribution table for each phase of the tournament based on the BWF points system for the BWF Tour Super 100 event.

| Winner | Runner-up | 3/4 | 5/8 | 9/16 | 17/32 | 33/64 | 65/128 | 129/256 |
|---|---|---|---|---|---|---|---|---|
| 5,500 | 4,680 | 3,850 | 3,030 | 2,110 | 1,290 | 510 | 240 | 100 |

=== Prize money ===
The total prize money for this tournament was US$75,000. Distribution of prize money was in accordance with BWF regulations.

| Event | Winner | Finals | Semi-finals | Quarter-finals | Last 16 |
| Singles | $5,625 | $2,850 | $1,087.50 | $450 | $262.50 |
| Doubles | $5,925 | $2,850 | $1,050 | $543.75 | $281.25 |

== Men's singles ==
=== Seeds ===
1. (India) Srikanth Kidambi (quarter-finals)
2. (Thailand) Kantaphon Wangcharoen (withdrew)
3. (Denmark) Hans-Kristian Vittinghus (semi-finals)
4. (Thailand) Kunlavut Vitidsarn (semi-finals)
5. (India) Parupalli Kashyap (second round)
6. (Thailand) Sitthikom Thammasin (withdrew)
7. (India) Prannoy Kumar (second round)
8. (Thailand) Khosit Phetpradab (withdrew)

=== Finals ===
Semi-finals
(France) Toma Junior Popov | 21 | 9 | 21
4 | (Thailand) Kunlavut Vitidsarn | 17 | 21 | 11
3 | (Denmark) Hans-Kristian Vittinghus | 22 | 13 | 12
(Denmark) Mads Christophersen | 20 | 21 | 21

Final
(France) Toma Junior Popov | 23 | 21
(Denmark) Mads Christophersen | 21 | 13

=== Top half ===
==== Section 1 ====
First Round
(India) A Jayaram | 19 | 23 | 21
PFQ | (India) A Mishra | 21 | 21 | 16
(Brazil) Y Coelho | 11 | 15
(Malaysia) Cheam J W | 21 | 21
(France) T J Popov | 21 | 21
(Azerbaijan) A R Dwicahyo | 15 | 9
(Mexico) L Muñoz | 18 | 21 | 15
Q4 | (Denmark) P I Klindt | 21 | 8 | 21

Second Round
1 | (India) S Kidambi | 21 | 21
(India) A Jayaram | 15 | 10
Q6 | (Germany) S Hsiao | 18 | 15
(Malaysia) Cheam J W | 21 | 21
5 | (India) Parupalli K | 7 | 17
(France) T J Popov | 21 | 21
PFQ | (England) A Lane | 18 | 11
Q4 | (Denmark) P I Klindt | 21 | 21

Third Round
1 | (India) S Kidambi | 21 | 22
(Malaysia) Cheam J W | 17 | 20
(France) T J Popov | 21 | 21
(Denmark) P I Klindt | 8 | 11

Quarter-finals
1 | (India) S Kidambi | 19 | 17
(France) T J Popov | 21 | 21

==== Section 2 ====
First Round
Q7 | (France) T Fourcade | 11 | 15
Q3 | (France) Y Gaudin | 21 | 21
(Denmark) K Bruun | 17 | 21 | 17
(Russia) S Sirant | 21 | 12 | 21
(Netherlands) M Caljouw | 21 | 18 | 20
(India) K George | 13 | 21 | 22
(Denmark) V Svendsen | 16 | 18
(France) B Leverdez | 21 | 21

Second Round
4 | (Thailand) K Vitidsarn | 21 | 21
Q3 | (France) Y Gaudin | 13 | 12
(Canada) XD Sheng | 10 | 21 | 21
(Russia) S Sirant | 21 | 19 | 13
7 | (India) Prannoy K | 21 | 16 | 21
(India) K George | 13 | 21 | 23
(Germany) M Weißkirchen | 19 | 15
(France) B Leverdez | 21 | 21

Third Round
4 | (Thailand) K Vitidsarn | 21 | 21
(Canada) XD Sheng | 15 | 11
(India) K George | 15 | 21 | 19
(France) B Leverdez | 21 | 14 | 21

Quarter-finals
4 | (Thailand) K Vitidsarn | 21 | 21
(France) B Leverdez | 13 | 9

=== Bottom half ===
==== Section 3 ====
First Round
PFQ | (India) M Manjunath | 21 | 21
(France) L Claerbout | 14 | 10
(Denmark) D J Holm | 21 | 21
(India) S Dey | 17 | 13
(Republic of Ireland) N Nguyen | 13 | 8
(Indonesia) C A Dwi Wardoyo | 21 | 21
(Malaysia) Soong J V | 21 | 21
Q5 | (England) J Torjussen | 13 | 19

Second Round
PFQ | (India) M Manjunath | 21 | 21 | 22
(Germany) K Schäfer | 23 | 9 | 24
(Denmark) D J Holm | 21 | 21
PFQ | (India) B. M. R Bharadwaj | 15 | 19
(Indonesia) C A Dwi Wardoyo | 13 | 12
(India) C Sen | 21 | 21
(Malaysia) Soong J V | 19 | 19
3 | (Denmark) H-K Vittinghus | 21 | 21

Third Round
(Germany) K Schäfer | 7 | 7
(Denmark) D J Holm | 21 | 21
(India) C Sen | 21 | 9 | 17
3 | (Denmark) H-K Vittinghus | 14 | 21 | 21

Quarter-finals
(Denmark) D J Holm | 11 | 15
3 | (Denmark) H-K Vittinghus | 21 | 21

==== Section 4 ====
First Round
(Canada) B. R. Sankeerth | 18 | 11
(France) T Rouxel | 21 | 21
Q8 | (Belgium) J Carraggi | 17 | 16
(Denmark) M Christophersen | 21 | 21
Q1 | (Denmark) M Johannesen | 21 | 21
PFQ | (Switzerland) C Kirchmayr | 18 | 12
(New Zealand) A Manota | 21 | 21
(Austria) L Wraber | 14 | 9

Second Round
(France) T Rouxel | 25 | 5 | 21
Q2 | (England) H Huang | 23 | 21 | 18
(Denmark) M Christophersen | 21 | 21
PFQ | (Italy) F Caponio | 10 | 10
Q1 | (Denmark) M Johannesen | 21 | 9 | 17
(France) C Popov | 16 | 21 | 21
(New Zealand) A Manota | 11 | 12
PFQ | (Netherlands) J Kweekel | 21 | 21

Third Round
(France) T Rouxel | 21 | 13 | 11
(Denmark) M Christophersen | 18 | 21 | 21
(France) C Popov | 22 | 19 | 11
PFQ | (Netherlands) J Kweekel | 20 | 21 | 21

Quarter-finals
(Denmark) M Christophersen | 21 | 21
PFQ | (Netherlands) J Kweekel | 14 | 10

== Women's singles ==
=== Seeds ===
1. (Thailand) Pornpawee Chochuwong (semi-finals)
2. (Denmark) Mia Blichfeldt (withdrew)
3. (Thailand) Busanan Ongbamrungphan (champion)
4. (India) Saina Nehwal (semi-finals)
5. (Russia) Evgeniya Kosetskaya (withdrew)
6. (Indonesia) Gregoria Mariska Tunjung (withdrew)
7. (Germany) Yvonne Li (first round)
8. (Turkey) Neslihan Yiğit (withdrew)

=== Finals ===
Semi-finals
1 | (Thailand) Pornpawee Chochuwong | 21 | 15 | 18
3 | (Thailand) Busanan Ongbamrungphan | 18 | 21 | 21
4 | (India) Saina Nehwal | 17 | 17
(Denmark) Line Christophersen | 21 | 21

Final
3 | (Thailand) Busanan Ongbamrungphan | 16 | 21 | 21
(Denmark) Line Christophersen | 21 | 15 | 19

=== Top half ===
==== Section 1 ====
First Round
1 | (Thailand) P Chochuwong | 21 | 21
PFQ | (Denmark) I A Andersen | 14 | 13
Q2 | (France) O Casier | 7 | 22 | 21
Q4 | (England) F Redfearn | 21 | 20 | 17
PFQ | (Malaysia) Goh J W | 21 | 21
Q1 | (Bulgaria) H Popovska | 8 | 14
(Belgium) L Tan | 20 | 15
(Turkey) A Demirbağ | 22 | 21

Second Round
1 | (Thailand) P Chochuwong | 21 | 21
Q2 | (France) O Casier | 11 | 5
PFQ | (Malaysia) Goh J W | 21 | 21
(Turkey) A Demirbağ | 9 | 16

Quarter-finals
1 | (Thailand) P Chochuwong | 21 | 21
PFQ | (Malaysia) Goh J W | 14 | 13

==== Section 2 ====
First Round
3 | (Thailand) B Ongbamrungphan | 21 | 21
(Thailand) P Chaiwan | 10 | 9
(Peru) D Macías | 6 | 10
(France) Qi XF | 21 | 21
7 | (Germany) Y Li | 18 | 21 | 15
Q3 | (Indonesia) P K Wardani | 21 | 16 | 21
(Russia) N Perminova | 17 | 16
(Switzerland) S Jaquet | 21 | 21

Second Round
3 | (Thailand) B Ongbamrungphan | 21 | 21
(France) Qi XF | 6 | 14
Q3 | (Indonesia) P K Wardani | 21 | 21
(Switzerland) S Jaquet | 16 | 16

Quarter-finals
3 | (Thailand) B Ongbamrungphan | 21 | 21
Q3 | (Indonesia) P K Wardani | 13 | 14

=== Bottom half ===
==== Section 3 ====
First Round
PFQ | (Malaysia) Lee Y Y | 6 | 9
(United States) I Wang | 21 | 21
PFQ | (France) Y Hoyaux | 21 | 21
PFQ | (Dominican Republic) N A Jiménez | 5 | 8
(Israel) K Polikarpova | 21 | 4
(France) M Batomene | 23 | 21
PFQ | (Republic of Ireland) R Darragh | 9 | 5
4 | (India) S Nehwal | 21 | 21

Second Round
(United States) I Wang | 21 | 21
PFQ | (France) Y Hoyaux | 11 | 14
(France) M Batomene | 21 | 15 | 10
4 | (India) S Nehwal | 18 | 21 | 21

Quarter-finals
(United States) I Wang | 19 | 21 | 19
4 | (India) S Nehwal | 21 | 17 | 21

==== Section 4 ====
First Round
(Hungary) L Sárosi | 17 | 10
(Bulgaria) M Mitsova | 21 | 21
PFQ | (France) L Huet | 21 | 14 | 17
PFQ | (India) I Sharma | 12 | 21 | 21
(Denmark) J D Jakobsen | 15 | 15
(Denmark) L Christophersen | 21 | 21
PFQ | (Denmark) A Schulz | 17 | 17
PFQ | (Czech Republic) K Tomalová | 21 | 21

Second Round
(Bulgaria) M Mitsova | 18 | 13
PFQ | (India) I Sharma | 21 | 21
(Denmark) L Christophersen | 21 | 21
PFQ | (Czech Republic) K Tomalová | 16 | 5

Quarter-finals
PFQ | (India) I Sharma | 11 | 8
(Denmark) L Christophersen | 21 | 21

== Men's doubles ==
=== Seeds ===
1. (England) Marcus Ellis / Chris Langridge (withdrew)
2. (Denmark) Kim Astrup / Anders Skaarup Rasmussen (withdrew)
3. (Russia) Vladimir Ivanov / Ivan Sozonov (withdrew)
4. (England) Ben Lane / Sean Vendy (champions)
5. (Germany) Mark Lamsfuß / Marvin Seidel (withdrew)
6. (Germany) Jones Ralfy Jansen / Peter Käsbauer (quarter-finals)
7. (India) Arjun M. R. / Dhruv Kapila (quarter-finals)
8. (Denmark) Mathias Christiansen / Niclas Nøhr (second round)

=== Finals ===
Semi-finals
(England) Callum Hemming (England) Steven Stallwood | 17 | 17
PFQ | (India) Krishna Prasad Garaga (India) Vishnuvardhan Goud Panjala | 21 | 21
4 | (England) Ben Lane (England) Sean Vendy | 10 | 21 | 21
PFQ | (Indonesia) Sabar Karyaman Gutama (Indonesia) Muhammad Reza Pahlevi Isfahani | 21 | 16 | 13

Final
PFQ | (India) Krishna Prasad Garaga (India) Vishnuvardhan Goud Panjala | 21 | 14 | 19
4 | (England) Ben Lane (England) Sean Vendy | 19 | 21 | 21

=== Top half ===
==== Section 1 ====
First Round
1 | (England) M Ellis (England) C Langridge
(Algeria) K Mammeri (Algeria) Y S Medel | w | / | o
(France) F Delrue (France) W Villeger
(England) C Hemming (England) S Stallwood | w | / | o
7 | (India) Arjun M. R. (India) D Kapila | 21 | 21
(England) M Clare (England) E van Leeuwen | 14 | 16
Q3
(England) R Easton (England) Z Russ | w | / | o

Second Round
(Algeria) K Mammeri (Algeria) Y S Medel | 9 | 16
(England) C Hemming (England) S Stallwood | 21 | 21
7 | (India) Arjun M. R. (India) D Kapila | 21 | 21
(England) R Easton (England) Z Russ | 11 | 12

Quarter-finals
(England) C Hemming (England) S Stallwood | 21 | 18 | 23
7 | (India) Arjun M. R. (India) D Kapila | 19 | 21 | 21

==== Section 2 ====
First Round
PFQ | (India) K P Garaga (India) V G Panjala | 21 | 21
PFQ | (Indonesia) F M Abiyyu (Indonesia) H Alfariz | 10 | 17
PFQ | (Denmark) A Søndergaard (Denmark) J Toft | 21 | 22 | 16
PFQ | (Denmark) K H Kræmer (Denmark) M Rindshøj | 19 | 24 | 21
8 | (Denmark) M Christiansen (Denmark) N Nøhr | 21 | 21
(New Zealand) O Leydon-Davis (New Zealand) A Manota | 12 | 15
(France) C Popov (France) T J Popov | 21 | 21
PFQ | (Algeria) M A Belarbi (Algeria) A Hamek | 13 | 15

Second Round
PFQ | (India) K P Garaga (India) V G Panjala | 21 | 21
PFQ | (Denmark) K H Kræmer (Denmark) M Rindshøj | 7 | 13
8 | (Denmark) M Christiansen (Denmark) N Nøhr | 17 | 18
(France) C Popov (France) T J Popov | 21 | 21

Quarter-finals
PFQ | (India) K P Garaga (India) V G Panjala | 21 | 10 | 22
(France) C Popov (France) T J Popov | 17 | 21 | 20

=== Bottom half ===
==== Section 3 ====
First Round
PFQ | (Belgium) J Carraggi (Belgium) J V Nieuwkerke | 14 | 17
(Republic of Ireland) J Magee (Republic of Ireland) P Reynolds | 21 | 21
(Denmark) P I Klindt (Denmark) M Thøgersen | w | / | o
5 | (Germany) M Lamsfuß (Germany) M Seidel
(France) E Adam (France) J Maio | w | / | o
Q4
(Denmark) D Lundgaard (Denmark) M Thyrri | 10 | 14
4 | (England) B Lane (England) S Vendy | 21 | 21

Second Round
(Republic of Ireland) J Magee (Republic of Ireland) P Reynolds | 21 | 21
(Denmark) P I Klindt (Denmark) M Thøgersen | 19 | 14
(France) E Adam (France) J Maio
4 | (England) B Lane (England) S Vendy | w | / | o

Quarter-finals
(Republic of Ireland) J Magee (Republic of Ireland) P Reynolds | 7 | 2^{r}
4 | (England) B Lane (England) S Vendy | 21 | 9

==== Section 4 ====
First Round
(Austria) P Birker (Austria) D Stipsits | 19 | 18
(Germany) D Hess (Germany) J Pistorius | 21 | 21
(Denmark) J Eipe (Denmark) R Kjær
6 | (Germany) J R Jansen (Germany) P Käsbauer | w | / | o
(Denmark) M P Kolding (Denmark) F Søgaard | w | / | o
Q1
Q2
PFQ | (Indonesia) S K Gutama (Indonesia) M R P Isfahani | w | / | o

Second Round
(Germany) D Hess (Germany) J Pistorius | 14 | 19
6 | (Germany) J R Jansen (Germany) P Käsbauer | 21 | 21
(Denmark) M P Kolding (Denmark) F Søgaard | 21 | 14 | 14
PFQ | (Indonesia) S K Gutama (Indonesia) M R P Isfahani | 15 | 21 | 21

Quarter-finals
6 | (Germany) J R Jansen (Germany) P Käsbauer | 15 | 9
PFQ | (Indonesia) S K Gutama (Indonesia) M R P Isfahani | 21 | 21

== Women's doubles ==
=== Seeds ===
1. (Thailand) Jongkolphan Kititharakul / Rawinda Prajongjai (champions)
2. (Bulgaria) Gabriela Stoeva / Stefani Stoeva (final)
3. (England) Chloe Birch / Lauren Smith (quarter-finals)
4. (Denmark) Maiken Fruergaard / Sara Thygesen (quarter-finals)
5. (France) Émilie Lefel / Anne Tran (withdrew)
6. (Netherlands) Selena Piek / Cheryl Seinen (semi-finals)
7. (Germany) Linda Efler / Isabel Herttrich (withdrew)
8. (India) N. Sikki Reddy / Ashwini Ponnappa (semi-finals)

=== Finals ===
Semi-finals
1 | (Thailand) Jongkolphan Kititharakul (Thailand) Rawinda Prajongjai | 21 | 21
8 | (India) Ashwini Ponnappa (India) N. Sikki Reddy | 18 | 9
6 | (Netherlands) Selena Piek (Netherlands) Cheryl Seinen | 21 | 14 | 9
2 | (Bulgaria) Gabriela Stoeva (Bulgaria) Stefani Stoeva | 10 | 21 | 21

Final
1 | (Thailand) Jongkolphan Kititharakul (Thailand) Rawinda Prajongjai | 21 | 21
2 | (Bulgaria) Gabriela Stoeva (Bulgaria) Stefani Stoeva | 16 | 16

=== Top half ===
==== Section 1 ====
First Round
1 | (Thailand) J Kititharakul (Thailand) R Prajongjai | w | / | o
(France) V Hériau (France) M Lambert
(Denmark) C Graversen (Denmark) A Schulz | w | / | o
(Republic of Ireland) K Frost (Republic of Ireland) M Ryan
PFQ | (Denmark) A C Kudsk (Denmark) S Schulz | w | / | o
(Malaysia) Teoh M X (Malaysia) Yap L
(Malaysia) A Cheong (Malaysia) Yap C W
(Denmark) J Finne-Ipsen (Denmark) M Surrow | w | / | o

Second Round
1 | (Thailand) J Kititharakul (Thailand) R Prajongjai | 21 | 21
(Denmark) C Graversen (Denmark) A Schulz | 9 | 8
PFQ | (Denmark) A C Kudsk (Denmark) S Schulz | 16 | 23 | 13
(Denmark) J Finne-Ipsen (Denmark) M Surrow | 21 | 21 | 21

Quarter-finals
1 | (Thailand) J Kititharakul (Thailand) R Prajongjai | 16 | 21 | 22
(Denmark) J Finne-Ipsen (Denmark) M Surrow | 21 | 15 | 20

==== Section 2 ====
First Round
3 | (England) C Birch (England) L Smith | 21 | 21
PFQ | (France) M Hoareau (France) C Pognante | 7 | 6
(Austria) S Au Yeong (Austria) K Hochmeir | w | / | o
Q2
8 | (India) A Ponnappa (India) N. S Reddy | 21 | 17 | 21
(Denmark) A Magelund (Denmark) F Ravn | 9 | 21 | 19
Q3
PFQ | (Indonesia) F D Kusuma (Indonesia) A C Pratiwi | w | / | o

Second Round
3 | (England) C Birch (England) L Smith | 21 | 21
(Austria) S Au Yeong (Austria) K Hochmeir | 10 | 9
8 | (India) A Ponnappa (India) N. S Reddy | w | / | o
PFQ | (Indonesia) F D Kusuma (Indonesia) A C Pratiwi

Quarter-finals
3 | (England) C Birch (England) L Smith | 14 | 18
8 | (India) A Ponnappa (India) N. S Reddy | 21 | 21

=== Bottom half ===
==== Section 3 ====
First Round
(Indonesia) Y Barkah (Indonesia) F V D Gani | 21 | 21
(India) A Agna (India) A Roy | 9 | 13
(Russia) A Akchurina (Russia) O Morozova
6 | (Netherlands) S Piek (Netherlands) C Seinen | w | / | o
(England) A Lado (England) V Williams | 17 | 13
(Germany) A Jäger (Germany) S Küspert | 21 | 21
4 | (Denmark) M Fruergaard (Denmark) S Thygesen | w | / | o

Second Round
(Indonesia) Y Barkah (Indonesia) F V D Gani | 15 | 22 | 17
6 | (Netherlands) S Piek (Netherlands) C Seinen | 21 | 20 | 21
(Germany) A Jäger (Germany) S Küspert | 10 | 14
4 | (Denmark) M Fruergaard (Denmark) S Thygesen | 21 | 21

Quarter-finals
6 | (Netherlands) S Piek (Netherlands) C Seinen | 23 | 21
4 | (Denmark) M Fruergaard (Denmark) S Thygesen | 21 | 15

==== Section 4 ====
First Round
(Denmark) A Bøje (Denmark) M Poulsen | 21 | 21
(Peru) D Macías (Peru) D Nishimura | 12 | 9
Q1 | w | / | o
7 | (Germany) L Efler (Germany) I Herttrich
(Germany) K Ostermeyer (Germany) F Volkmann
(Indonesia) N V Marwah (Indonesia) P Syaikah | w | / | o
(Indonesia) S F S Ramadhanti (Indonesia) R Sugiarto
2 | (Bulgaria) G Stoeva (Bulgaria) S Stoeva | w | / | o

Second Round
(Denmark) A Bøje (Denmark) M Poulsen | w | / | o
7 | (Germany) L Efler (Germany) I Herttrich
(Indonesia) N V Marwah (Indonesia) P Syaikah | 15 | 15
2 | (Bulgaria) G Stoeva (Bulgaria) S Stoeva | 21 | 21

Quarter-finals
(Denmark) A Bøje (Denmark) M Poulsen | 14 | 14
2 | (Bulgaria) G Stoeva (Bulgaria) S Stoeva | 21 | 21

== Mixed doubles ==
=== Seeds ===
1. (England) Marcus Ellis / Lauren Smith (withdrew)
2. (Malaysia) Goh Soon Huat / Shevon Jemie Lai (withdrew)
3. (France) Thom Gicquel / Delphine Delrue (withdrew)
4. (England) Chris Adcock / Gabby Adcock (withdrew)
5. (Germany) Mark Lamsfuß / Isabel Herttrich (withdrew)
6. (Netherlands) Robin Tabeling / Selena Piek (withdrew)
7. (Denmark) Mathias Christiansen / Alexandra Bøje (champions)
8. (Russia) Rodion Alimov / Alina Davletova (withdrew)

=== Finals ===
Semi-finals
(Denmark) Niclas Nøhr (Denmark) Amalie Magelund | 21 | 21 | 21
(India) Dhruv Kapila (India) Ashwini Ponnappa | 9 | 23 | 7
7 | (Denmark) Mathias Christiansen (Denmark) Alexandra Bøje | 21 | 18 | 21
PFQ | (Indonesia) Zachariah Josiahno Sumanti (Indonesia) Hediana Julimarbela | 13 | 21 | 16

Final
(Denmark) Niclas Nøhr (Denmark) Amalie Magelund | 13 | 17
7 | (Denmark) Mathias Christiansen (Denmark) Alexandra Bøje | 21 | 21

=== Top half ===
==== Section 1 ====
First Round
PFQ | (Dominican Republic) C A B González (Dominican Republic) N A Jiménez | 6 | 11
PFQ | (Belgium) J Van Nieuwkerke (Belgium) L Jaques | 21 | 21
PFQ | (Austria) P Birker (Austria) K Hochmeir | w | / | o
Q3
PFQ | (England) S Stallwood (England) A Lado | 10 | 9
(Denmark) N Nøhr (Denmark) A Magelund | 21 | 21
(India) P Chopra (India) N. S Reddy | 21 | 21
PFQ | (Austria) D Stipsits (Austria) S Au Yeong | 7 | 18

Second Round
PFQ | (Belgium) J Van Nieuwkerke (Belgium) L Jaques | 21 | 21
PFQ | (Austria) P Birker (Austria) K Hochmeir | 10 | 14
(Denmark) N Nøhr (Denmark) A Magelund | 21 | 21
(India) P Chopra (India) N. S Reddy | 10 | 7

Quarter-finals
PFQ | (Belgium) J Van Nieuwkerke (Belgium) L Jaques | 11 | 11
(Denmark) N Nøhr (Denmark) A Magelund | 21 | 21

==== Section 2 ====
First Round
PFQ | (Bulgaria) I Stoynov (Bulgaria) H Popovska | 8 | 12
(India) D Kapila (India) A Ponnappa | 21 | 21
(Denmark) M Mikkelsen (Denmark) R Søby Hansen
(England) C Hemming (England) V Williams | w | / | o
6 | (Netherlands) R Tabeling (Netherlands) S Piek
(England) M Flynn (England) J Pugh | w | / | o
PFQ | (Malaysia) Wong T C (Malaysia) Lim C S | 16 | 21 | 21
PFQ | (Republic of Ireland) P Reynolds (Republic of Ireland) R Darragh | 21 | 12 | 17

Second Round
(India) D Kapila (India) A Ponnappa | 21 | 21
(England) C Hemming (England) V Williams | 12 | 18
(England) M Flynn (England) J Pugh | 23 | 22
PFQ | (Malaysia) Wong T C (Malaysia) Lim C S | 21 | 20

Quarter-finals
(India) D Kapila (India) A Ponnappa | 21 | 21
(England) M Flynn (England) J Pugh | 13 | 18

=== Bottom half ===
==== Section 3 ====
First Round
(Republic of Ireland) S Magee (Republic of Ireland) C Magee | 15 | 17
(Germany) J R Jansen (Germany) K Ostermeyer | 21 | 21
Q4
7 | (Denmark) M Christiansen (Denmark) A Bøje | w | / | o
PFQ | (Denmark) A Søndergaard (Denmark) J Finne-Ipsen | 10 | 17
(Denmark) M Thyrri (Denmark) M Surrow | 21 | 21
(Indonesia) A B Cahyono (Indonesia) W O Kandow | 21 | 21
PFQ | (Germany) M Datko (Germany) S Küspert | 19 | 11

Second Round
(Germany) J R Jansen (Germany) K Ostermeyer | 18 | 14
7 | (Denmark) M Christiansen (Denmark) A Bøje | 21 | 21
(Denmark) M Thyrri (Denmark) M Surrow | 21 | 21
(Indonesia) A B Cahyono (Indonesia) W O Kandow | 13 | 17

Quarter-finals
7 | (Denmark) M Christiansen (Denmark) A Bøje | 21 | 18 | 21
(Denmark) M Thyrri (Denmark) M Surrow | 4 | 21 | 16

==== Section 4 ====
First Round
Q2
Q1
(New Zealand) O Leydon-Davis (New Zealand) A Pak | 21 | 24
PFQ | (Germany) J Pistorius (Germany) A Jäger | 18 | 22
PFQ | (Denmark) J Toft (Denmark) C Graversen | 17 | 19
(Denmark) J Bay (Denmark) S Lundgaard | 21 | 21
PFQ | (Denmark) K H Kræmer (Denmark) A C Kudsk | 18 | 9
PFQ | (Indonesia) Z J Sumanti (Indonesia) H Julimarbela | 21 | 21

Second Round
Q
(New Zealand) O Leydon-Davis (New Zealand) A Pak | w | / | o
(Denmark) J Bay (Denmark) S Lundgaard | 17 | 15
PFQ | (Indonesia) Z J Sumanti (Indonesia) H Julimarbela | 21 | 21

Quarter-finals
(New Zealand) O Leydon-Davis (New Zealand) A Pak | 11 | 23^{r}
PFQ | (Indonesia) Z J Sumanti (Indonesia) H Julimarbela | 21 | 23

| Preceded by 2021 All England Open | BWF World Tour; 2021 BWF season | Succeeded by 2021 Spain Masters |
