= 2026 Hylo Open =

2026 badminton tournament in Saarbrücken

Tournament details
- Dates: 27 October – 1 November
- Edition: 39th
- Level: Super 500
- Total prize money: US$500,000
- Venue: Saarlandhalle
- Location: Saarbrücken, Germany

Champions
- Men's singles: (India) Lakshya Sen
- Women's singles: (India) P. V. Sindhu
- Men's doubles: (Denmark) Christian Faust Kjær (Denmark) Rasmus Kjær
- Women's doubles: (Indonesia) Amallia Cahaya Pratiwi (Indonesia) Siti Fadia Silva Ramadhanti
- Mixed doubles: (France) Thom Gicquel (France) Delphine Delrue
- Official website: hylo-open.de/en/

The 2026 Hylo Open was a badminton tournament which took place at the Saarlandhalle in Saarbrücken, Germany, from 27 October to 1 November 2026 and had a total prize of US$500,000.

== Tournament ==
The 2026 Hylo Open was the twenty-ninth tournament of the 2026 BWF World Tour. It is a part of the Hylo Open, which had been held since 1988. This tournament is organized by the 1. BC Bischmisheim with sanction from the BWF.

=== Venue ===
This international tournament was held at the Saarlandhalle in Saarbrücken, Germany.

=== Point distribution ===
Below is the point distribution table for each phase of the tournament based on the BWF points system for the BWF World Tour Super 500 event.

Winner	Runner-up	3/4	5/8	9/16	17/32	33/64	65/128
9,200	7,800	6,420	5,040	3,600	2,220	880	430

=== Prize money ===
The total prize money is US$475,000 and will be distributed according to BWF regulations.

Event	Winner	Finalist	Semi-finals	Quarter-finals	Last 16
Singles	$37,500	$19,000	$7,250	$3,000	$1,750
Doubles	$39,500	$19,000	$7,000	$3,625	$1,875

== Men's singles ==
=== Seeds ===
1. (Denmark) Anders Antonsen (semi-finals)
2. (France) Christo Popov (withdrew)
3. (France) Alex Lanier (withdrew)
4. (Indonesia) Jonatan Christie (final)
5. (Japan) Kodai Naraoka (quarter-finals)
6. (France) Toma Junior Popov (semi-finals)
7. (India) Lakshya Sen (champion)
8. (India) Ayush Shetty (withdrew)

=== Finals ===
Semi-finals
1	(Denmark) Anders Antonsen	18	13^{r}
4	(Indonesia) Jonatan Christie	21	16
6	(France) Toma Junior Popov	17	13
7	(India) Lakshya Sen	21	21

Final
4	(Indonesia) Jonatan Christie	17	10
7	(India) Lakshya Sen	21	21

=== Top half ===
==== Section 1 ====
First round
1	(Denmark) A Antonsen	21	21
(England) H Huang	14	18
Q3	(Azerbaijan) A R Dwicahyo	21	12	21
(Israel) D Dubovenko	11	21	19
SWM	(Denmark) R Gemke	21	21
(Chinese Taipei) Su L-y	9	17
(Japan) K Nishimoto	19	21	12
(Denmark) D J Holm	21	11	21

Second round
1	(Denmark) A Antonsen	22	21
Q3	(Azerbaijan) A R Dwicahyo	20	19
SWM	(Denmark) R Gemke	5	0^{r}
(Denmark) D J Holm	21	0

Quarter-finals
1	(Denmark) A Antonsen	21	21
(Denmark) D J Holm	11	13

==== Section 2 ====
First round
4	(Indonesia) J Christie	21	21
Q4	(Denmark) W Bøgebjerg	18	16
(Japan) M Koga	21	21
PFQ	(United States) G Tan	13	11
5	(Japan) K Naraoka	21	21
Q2	(Poland) D Kwinta	18	14
(Malaysia) Lee Z J	21	19	21
(Singapore) J Teh	16	21	17

Second round
4	(Indonesia) J Christie	21	13	21
(Japan) M Koga	14	21	18
5	(Japan) K Naraoka	21	13	21
(Malaysia) Lee Z J	11	21	14

Quarter-finals
4	(Indonesia) J Christie	21	18	21
5	(Japan) K Naraoka	8	21	11

=== Bottom half ===
==== Section 3 ====
First round
(Denmark) M Johannesen	18	14
(France) A Merklé	21	21
(India) T Mannepalli	15	19
SWM	(Chinese Taipei) Chi Y-j	21	21
Q1	(Netherlands) N Haase	16	17
(Belgium) J Carraggi	21	21
(India) Prannoy H. S.	21	16
6	(France) T J Popov	23	21

Second round
(France) A Merklé	21	21
SWM	(Chinese Taipei) Chi Y-j	19	12
(Belgium) J Carraggi	17	21	19
6	(France) T J Popov	21	15	21

Quarter-finals
(France) A Merklé	14	15
6	(France) T J Popov	21	21

==== Section 4 ====
First round
(India) K George	21	21
(Malaysia) Cheam J W	18	17
(Finland) J Oldorff	21	9	13
7	(India) L Sen	16	21	21
PFQ	(Israel) M Zilberman	12	14
PFQ	(Croatia) A Dinata	21	21
(Finland) K Koljonen	21	21
PFQ	(India) S Subramanian	11	16

Second round
(India) K George	15	21	12
7	(India) L Sen	21	18	21
PFQ	(Croatia) A Dinata	11	13
(Finland) K Koljonen	21	21

Quarter-finals
7	(India) L Sen	14	21	21
(Finland) K Koljonen	21	17	13

== Women's singles ==
=== Seeds ===
1. (Thailand) Pornpawee Chochuwong (semi-finals)
2. (India) P. V. Sindhu (champion)
3. (Denmark) Line Christophersen (second round)
4. (Denmark) Mia Blichfeldt (withdrew)
5. (Canada) Michelle Li (withdrew)
6. (India) Unnati Hooda (quarter-finals)
7. (Chinese Taipei) Huang Yu-hsun (first round)
8. (Denmark) Line Kjærsfeldt (final)

=== Finals ===
Semi-finals
1	(Thailand) Pornpawee Chochuwong	21	19	26
8	(Denmark) Line Kjærsfeldt	8	21	28
(India) Anmol Kharb	13	16
2	(India) P. V. Sindhu	21	21

Final
8	(Denmark) Line Kjærsfeldt	12	14
2	(India) P. V. Sindhu	21	21

=== Top half ===
==== Section 1 ====
First round
1	(Thailand) P Chochuwong	21	21
PFQ	(Denmark) A S Ryberg	17	11
(India) A Kashyap	12	18
(Ukraine) P Buhrova	21	21
SWM	(India) D Sihag	21	10	14
(India) M Bansod	18	21	21
(Czech Republic) P Maixnerová	16	17
(Canada) W Y Zhang	21	21

Second round
1	(Thailand) P Chochuwong	21	17	21
(Ukraine) P Buhrova	19	21	9
(India) M Bansod	11	17
(Canada) W Y Zhang	21	21

Quarter-finals
1	(Thailand) P Chochuwong	21	18	21
(Canada) W Y Zhang	19	21	17

==== Section 2 ====
First round
8	(Denmark) L Kjærsfeldt	16	21	21
(Thailand) Tonr Saeheng	21	18	12
(India) I Baruah	21	21
Q4	(Germany) M Wilson	19	9
SWM	(Turkey) N Arın	8	17
(Chinese Taipei) Sung S-y	21	21
(United States) E Lin	15	12
(Scotland) K Gilmour	21	21

Second round
8	(Denmark) L Kjærsfeldt	21	21
(India) I Baruah	14	19
(Chinese Taipei) Sung S-y	2	11
(Scotland) K Gilmour	21	21

Quarter-finals
8	(Denmark) L Kjærsfeldt	21	21
(Scotland) K Gilmour	17	13

=== Bottom half ===
==== Section 3 ====
First round
Q2	(Denmark) F Østergaard	21	21
(Ukraine) Y Kantemyr	16	16
(Czech Republic) T Švábíková	21	12	11
6	(India) U Hooda	17	21	21
Q1	(Sri Lanka) R Liyanage	18	20
(India) A Kharb	21	22
(Azerbaijan) K F Azzahra	15	12
3	(Denmark) L Christophersen	21	21

Second round
Q2	(Denmark) F Østergaard	11	19
6	(India) U Hooda	21	21
(India) A Kharb	11	21	25
3	(Denmark) L Christophersen	21	18	23

Quarter-finals
6	(India) U Hooda	17	21	16
(India) A Kharb	21	18	21

==== Section 4 ====
First round
(Bulgaria) K Nalbantova	18	21	21
(India) A Chaliha	21	12	8
(Denmark) A Schulz	21	21
7	(Chinese Taipei) Huang Y-h	14	17
(Germany) Y Li	21	18	19
Q3	(France) R O Pancasari	13	21	21
PFQ	(United Arab Emirates) P Bharath	10	10
2	(India) P. V. Sindhu	21	21

Second round
(Bulgaria) K Nalbantova	17	16
(Denmark) A Schulz	21	21
Q3	(France) R O Pancasari	9	6
2	(India) P. V. Sindhu	21	21

Quarter-finals
(Denmark) A Schulz	12	10
2	(India) P. V. Sindhu	21	21

== Men's doubles ==
=== Seeds ===
1. (Indonesia) Sabar Karyaman Gutama / Muhammad Reza Pahlevi Isfahani (second round)
2. (England) Ben Lane / Sean Vendy (final)
3. (Denmark) Daniel Lundgaard / Mads Vestergaard (quarter-finals)
4. (Indonesia) Raymond Indra / Nikolaus Joaquin (second round)
5. (Chinese Taipei) Chiu Hsiang-chieh / Wang Chi-lin (quarter-finals)
6. (Chinese Taipei) Lee Jhe-huei / Yang Po-hsuan (second round)
7. (Denmark) Kim Astrup / Anders Skaarup Rasmussen (second round)
8. (France) Christo Popov / Toma Junior Popov (withdrew)

=== Finals ===
Semi-finals
(Malaysia) Aaron Tai (Malaysia) Yap Roy King	21	15	18
SWM	(Denmark) Christian Faust Kjær (Denmark) Rasmus Kjær	18	21	21
(France) Julien Maio (France) William Villeger	13	21	16
2	(England) Ben Lane (England) Sean Vendy	21	18	21

Final
SWM	(Denmark) Christian Faust Kjær (Denmark) Rasmus Kjær	21	21
2	(England) Ben Lane (England) Sean Vendy	14	18

=== Top half ===
==== Section 1 ====
First round
1	(Indonesia) S K Gutama (Indonesia) M R P Isfahani	19	21	21
(England) A Green (England) Z Russ	21	13	11
(Germany) M Bourakkadi (Germany) K Neumann	11	12
(Malaysia) A Tai (Malaysia) Yap R K	21	21
5	(Chinese Taipei) Chiu H-c (Chinese Taipei) Wang C-l	21	21
PFQ	(Spain) J Fernández (Spain) A Perals	11	13
Q4	(France) N Begga (France) G Deschamp	w	/	o
(Indonesia) L R Carnando (Indonesia) D Marthin

Second round
1	(Indonesia) S K Gutama (Indonesia) M R P Isfahani	20	19
(Malaysia) A Tai (Malaysia) Yap R K	22	21
5	(Chinese Taipei) Chiu H-c (Chinese Taipei) Wang C-l	21	21
Q4	(France) N Begga (France) G Deschamp	14	14

Quarter-finals
(Malaysia) A Tai (Malaysia) Yap R K	21	21
5	(Chinese Taipei) Chiu H-c (Chinese Taipei) Wang C-l	16	17

==== Section 2 ====
First round
4	(Indonesia) R Indra (Indonesia) N Joaquin	17	21	21
(Germany) J Dresp (Germany) S Krax	21	15	15
(Denmark) W K Boe (Denmark) R Espersen	23	21	21
PFQ	(Denmark) K Kolding (Denmark) C Lundsgaard	25	13	17
SWM	(Denmark) C F Kjær (Denmark) R Kjær	21	21
Q2	(Czech Republic) V Havlíček (Czech Republic) T Švejda	8	6
Q3	(Switzerland) Y Orteu (Switzerland) M Q Pham	12	21	16
Q1	(Republic of Ireland) S Guildea (Republic of Ireland) P Reynolds	21	17	21

Second round
4	(Indonesia) R Indra (Indonesia) N Joaquin	14	19
(Denmark) W K Boe (Denmark) R Espersen	21	21
SWM	(Denmark) C F Kjær (Denmark) R Kjær	21	21
Q1	(Republic of Ireland) S Guildea (Republic of Ireland) P Reynolds	11	10

Quarter-finals
(Denmark) W K Boe (Denmark) R Espersen	13	11
SWM	(Denmark) C F Kjær (Denmark) R Kjær	21	21

=== Bottom half ===
==== Section 3 ====
First round
(France) J Maio (France) W Villeger	21	21
(England) O Butler (England) S Jones	13	12
(France) M Cattoen (France) L Renoir	17	18
6	(Chinese Taipei) Lee J-h (Chinese Taipei) Yang P-h	21	21
(Indonesia) A F Rayhan (Indonesia) D A Wahyudi	16	17
(Czech Republic) J Král (Czech Republic) O Král	21	21
PFQ	(England) R Harper (England) H Wakefield	18	22
3	(Denmark) D Lundgaard (Denmark) M Vestergaard	21	24

Second round
(France) J Maio (France) W Villeger	16	21	21
6	(Chinese Taipei) Lee J-h (Chinese Taipei) Yang P-h	21	19	12
(Czech Republic) J Král (Czech Republic) O Král	15	16
3	(Denmark) D Lundgaard (Denmark) M Vestergaard	21	21

Quarter-finals
(France) J Maio (France) W Villeger	25	21
3	(Denmark) D Lundgaard (Denmark) M Vestergaard	23	14

==== Section 4 ====
First round
(Chinese Taipei) Chen C-k (Chinese Taipei) Liu K-h	21	23
(Denmark) R Nebel (Denmark) J Søby	13	21
(Germany) B Geiss (Germany) J R Jansen	16	12
7	(Denmark) K Astrup (Denmark) A S Rasmussen	21	21
(Scotland) C Grimley (Scotland) M Grimley	22	14
(France) É Adam (France) L Rossi	24	21
(Malaysia) Chia W J (Malaysia) Teo E Y	14	7^{r}
2	(England) B Lane (England) S Vendy	21	11

Second round
(Chinese Taipei) Chen C-k (Chinese Taipei) Liu K-h	19	21	21
7	(Denmark) K Astrup (Denmark) A S Rasmussen	21	10	17
(France) É Adam (France) L Rossi	15	13
2	(England) B Lane (England) S Vendy	21	21

Quarter-finals
(Chinese Taipei) Chen C-k (Chinese Taipei) Liu K-h	18	14
2	(England) B Lane (England) S Vendy	21	21

== Women's doubles ==
=== Seeds ===
1. (Chinese Taipei) Hsu Yin-hui / Lin Jhih-yun (final)
2. (Indonesia) Rachel Allessya Rose / Febi Setianingrum (first round)
3. (Indonesia) Febriana Dwipuji Kusuma / Meilysa Trias Puspita Sari (quarter-finals)
4. (Bulgaria) Gabriela Stoeva / Stefani Stoeva (semi-finals)
5. (Indonesia) Amallia Cahaya Pratiwi / Siti Fadia Silva Ramadhanti (champions)
6. (Chinese Taipei) Hsu Ya-ching / Sung Yu-hsuan (quarter-finals)
7. (United States) Lauren Lam / Allison Lee (semi-finals)
8. (Hong Kong) Yeung Nga Ting / Yeung Pui Lam (quarter-finals)

=== Finals ===
Semi-finals
1	(Chinese Taipei) Hsu Yin-hui (Chinese Taipei) Lin Jhih-yun	21	21
7	(United States) Lauren Lam (United States) Allison Lee	16	15
4	(Bulgaria) Gabriela Stoeva (Bulgaria) Stefani Stoeva	16	22
5	(Indonesia) Amallia Cahaya Pratiwi (Indonesia) Siti Fadia Silva Ramadhanti	21	24

Final
1	(Chinese Taipei) Hsu Yin-hui (Chinese Taipei) Lin Jhih-yun	18	19
5	(Indonesia) Amallia Cahaya Pratiwi (Indonesia) Siti Fadia Silva Ramadhanti	21	21

=== Top half ===
==== Section 1 ====
First round
1	(Chinese Taipei) Hsu Y-h (Chinese Taipei) Lin J-y	18	23	21
(Scotland) J MacPherson (Scotland) C Torrance	21	21	11
(Spain) N Carulla (Spain) C M Jiménez	13	17
(Denmark) L Hvid (Denmark) A Klausholm	21	21
6	(Chinese Taipei) Hsu Y-c (Chinese Taipei) Sung Y-h	21	8	21
(Hong Kong) Lui L L (Hong Kong) Tsang H Y	19	21	10
Q4	(England) L Curtin (England) Y Tang	17	16
(France) M Lambert (France) C Pognante	21	21

Second round
1	(Chinese Taipei) Hsu Y-h (Chinese Taipei) Lin J-y	21	21
(Denmark) L Hvid (Denmark) A Klausholm	14	12
6	(Chinese Taipei) Hsu Y-c (Chinese Taipei) Sung Y-h	21	21
(France) M Lambert (France) C Pognante	14	16

Quarter-finals
1	(Chinese Taipei) Hsu Y-h (Chinese Taipei) Lin J-y	21	21
6	(Chinese Taipei) Hsu Y-c (Chinese Taipei) Sung Y-h	16	14

==== Section 2 ====
First round
3	(Indonesia) F D Kusuma (Indonesia) M T Puspita Sari	21	21
(Poland) P Cybulska (Poland) K Marczak	13	9
(Chinese Taipei) Chang C-h (Chinese Taipei) Yang C-t	21	21
Q2	(Germany) M Kelch (Germany) L Marburger	10	10
7	(United States) L Lam (United States) A Lee	21	21
(Germany) S Hübsch (Germany) A Lehmann	8	6
(Denmark) A C Kudsk (Denmark) S Pilgaard	15	23
(Turkey) B Erçetin (Turkey) N İnci	21	25

Second round
3	(Indonesia) F D Kusuma (Indonesia) M T Puspita Sari	21	21
(Chinese Taipei) Chang C-h (Chinese Taipei) Yang C-t	14	11
7	(United States) L Lam (United States) A Lee	21	23
(Turkey) B Erçetin (Turkey) N İnci	8	21

Quarter-finals
3	(Indonesia) F D Kusuma (Indonesia) M T Puspita Sari	19	10
7	(United States) L Lam (United States) A Lee	21	21

=== Bottom half ===
==== Section 3 ====
First round
(Malaysia) Ong X Y (Malaysia) C Ting	21	21
(England) A Harris (England) E van Leeuwen	12	17
(Chinese Taipei) Lin C-c (Chinese Taipei) Yang C-y	13	9
8	(Hong Kong) Yeung N T (Hong Kong) Yeung P L	21	21
(Ukraine) P Buhrova (Ukraine) Y Kantemyr	21	21
(Spain) P López (Spain) A Torralba	14	17
(Denmark) A-S Nielsen (Denmark) S Røjkjær	9	15
4	(Bulgaria) G Stoeva (Bulgaria) S Stoeva	21	21

Second round
(Malaysia) Ong X Y (Malaysia) C Ting	16	21	20
8	(Hong Kong) Yeung N T (Hong Kong) Yeung P L	21	11	22
(Ukraine) P Buhrova (Ukraine) Y Kantemyr	9	15
4	(Bulgaria) G Stoeva (Bulgaria) S Stoeva	21	21

Quarter-finals
8	(Hong Kong) Yeung N T (Hong Kong) Yeung P L	18	13
4	(Bulgaria) G Stoeva (Bulgaria) S Stoeva	21	21

==== Section 4 ====
First round
(Italy) M Corsini (Italy) E Piccinin	14	21
(England) S Kelly (England) L Tolman	21	23
(Netherlands) K de Wit (Netherlands) M Loos	12	12
5	(Indonesia) A C Pratiwi (Indonesia) S F S Ramadhanti	21	21
Q3	(Austria) S Dlapka (Austria) L Rumpold	9	11
(Denmark) K Vang (Denmark) M Werge	21	21
Q1	(Germany) S Küspert (Germany) I Lohau	21	21
2	(Indonesia) R A Rose (Indonesia) F Setianingrum	14	19

Second round
(England) S Kelly (England) L Tolman	11	15
5	(Indonesia) A C Pratiwi (Indonesia) S F S Ramadhanti	21	21
(Denmark) K Vang (Denmark) M Werge	13	9
Q1	(Germany) S Küspert (Germany) I Lohau	21	21

Quarter-finals
5	(Indonesia) A C Pratiwi (Indonesia) S F S Ramadhanti	21	21
Q1	(Germany) S Küspert (Germany) I Lohau	7	10

== Mixed doubles ==
=== Seeds ===
1. (Denmark) Mathias Christiansen / Alexandra Bøje (withdrew)
2. (France) Thom Gicquel / Delphine Delrue (champions)
3. (Chinese Taipei) Ye Hong-wei / Nicole Gonzales Chan (second round)
4. (Chinese Taipei) Yang Po-hsuan / Hu Ling-fang (second round)
5. (Indonesia) Amri Syahnawi / Nita Violina Marwah (semi-finals)
6. (Chinese Taipei) Liu Kuang-heng / Hsu Yin-hui (second round)
7. (Hong Kong) Chan Yin Chak / Ng Tsz Yau (quarter-finals)
8. (Germany) Marvin Seidel / Thuc Phuong Nguyen (quarter-finals)

=== Finals ===
Semi-finals
5	(Indonesia) Amri Syahnawi (Indonesia) Nita Violina Marwah	23	12	20
(Denmark) Jesper Toft (Denmark) Amalie Cecilie Kudsk	21	21	22
(Malaysia) Hoo Pang Ron (Malaysia) Lai Pei Jing	20	21	17
2	(France) Thom Gicquel (France) Delphine Delrue	22	16	21

Final
(Denmark) Jesper Toft (Denmark) Amalie Cecilie Kudsk	21	20	18
2	(France) Thom Gicquel (France) Delphine Delrue	19	22	21

=== Top half ===
==== Section 1 ====
First round
3	(Chinese Taipei) Ye H-w (Chinese Taipei) N G Chan	21	21
Q4	(England) H Wakefield (England) S Kelly	15	9
(Spain) R García (Spain) L Rodríguez	21	21
PFQ	(Bulgaria) E Panev (Bulgaria) G Stoeva	8	10
5	(Indonesia) A Syahnawi (Indonesia) N V Marwah	21	21
(France) G Deschamp (Denmark) I Bergstein	18	18
(Indonesia) D Ferdinansyah (Indonesia) F Pasaribu	21	19	21
PFQ	(Germany) P Volkmann (Germany) F Volkmann	14	21	16

Second round
3	(Chinese Taipei) Ye H-w (Chinese Taipei) N G Chan	7	15
(Spain) R García (Spain) L Rodríguez	21	21
5	(Indonesia) A Syahnawi (Indonesia) N V Marwah	21	22
(Indonesia) D Ferdinansyah (Indonesia) F Pasaribu	18	20

Quarter-finals
(Spain) R García (Spain) L Rodríguez	21	14	19
5	(Indonesia) A Syahnawi (Indonesia) N V Marwah	16	21	21

==== Section 2 ====
First round
6	(Chinese Taipei) Liu K-h (Chinese Taipei) Hsu Y-h	21	19	25
PFQ	(England) R Harper (England) Y Tang	10	21	23
(Denmark) J Toft (Denmark) A C Kudsk	21	21
(Thailand) Tonk Saeheng (Thailand) Tonr Saeheng	6	11
SWM	(England) C Hemming (England) E van Leeuwen	21	21
(England) S Jones (England) L Tolman	18	18
(Denmark) K Kolding (Denmark) M Werge	21	21
(Switzerland) N Franconville (Switzerland) J Franconville	10	10

Second round
6	(Chinese Taipei) Liu K-h (Chinese Taipei) Hsu Y-h	17	16
(Denmark) J Toft (Denmark) A C Kudsk	21	21
SWM	(England) C Hemming (England) E van Leeuwen	21	22
(Denmark) K Kolding (Denmark) M Werge	18	20

Quarter-finals
(Denmark) J Toft (Denmark) A C Kudsk	14	21	21
SWM	(England) C Hemming (England) E van Leeuwen	21	14	7

=== Bottom half ===
==== Section 3 ====
First round
(Chinese Taipei) Wu H-y (Chinese Taipei) Yang C-y	21	22
(France) N Begga (France) E Jacob	16	20
Q2	(Germany) D Eckerlin (Germany) M Kelch	15	14
7	(Hong Kong) Chan Y C (Hong Kong) Ng T Y	21	21
(Malaysia) Hoo P R (Malaysia) Lai P J	21	21
Q3	(Netherlands) J Strooper (Netherlands) S Bang	13	13
(Italy) I Santoro (Trinidad and Tobago) C de Boulet	6	4
4	(Chinese Taipei) Yang P-h (Chinese Taipei) Hu L-f	21	21

Second round
(Chinese Taipei) Wu H-y (Chinese Taipei) Yang C-y	22	18	19
7	(Hong Kong) Chan Y C (Hong Kong) Ng T Y	20	21	21
(Malaysia) Hoo P R (Malaysia) Lai P J	21	21
4	(Chinese Taipei) Yang P-h (Chinese Taipei) Hu L-f	9	16

Quarter-finals
7	(Hong Kong) Chan Y C (Hong Kong) Ng T Y	17	17
(Malaysia) Hoo P R (Malaysia) Lai P J	21	21

==== Section 4 ====
First round
PFQ	(Germany) C Devereux (Germany) D Töpffer	4	7
(Denmark) R Espersen (Denmark) A-S Nielsen	21	21
Q1	(Germany) J C Völker (Germany) E Moszczynski	22	16	13
8	(Germany) M Seidel (Germany) T P Nguyen	20	21	21
(Germany) S Krax (Germany) A Lehmann	14	21
(Denmark) J Søby (Denmark) S Røjkjær	21	23
(Algeria) K Mammeri (Algeria) T Mammeri	13	17
2	(France) T Gicquel (France) D Delrue	21	21

Second round
(Denmark) R Espersen (Denmark) A-S Nielsen	17	20
8	(Germany) M Seidel (Germany) T P Nguyen	21	22
(Denmark) J Søby (Denmark) S Røjkjær	15	14
2	(France) T Gicquel (France) D Delrue	21	21

Quarter-finals
8	(Germany) M Seidel (Germany) T P Nguyen	12	11
2	(France) T Gicquel (France) D Delrue	21	21

Preceded by 2026 French Open; 2026 Indonesia Masters Super 100 II	BWF World Tour; 2026 BWF season	Succeeded by 2026 Korea Open
