= Badminton at the 2020 Summer Olympics – Qualification =

Badminton championships

There are 172 quota places available for qualification for badminton at the 2020 Summer Olympics (postponed to 2021 due to the COVID-19 pandemic). The Olympic qualification period took place between April 29, 2019 and April 25, 2021, and the Badminton World Federation rankings list, scheduled to publish on June 15, 2021, was used to allocate spots. Nations can enter a maximum of two players each in the men's and women's singles if both are ranked in the world's top 16; otherwise, one quota place until the roster of thirty-eight players has been completed. Similar regulations also apply to the players competing in the doubles, as the NOCs (National Olympic Committees) can enter a maximum of two pairs if both are ranked in the top eight, while the remaining NOCs are entitled to one until the quota of 16 highest-ranked pairs is filled.

On May 28, 2021, the Badminton World Federation had confirmed that there is no further tournament to be played inside the qualifying window due to events being cancelled or postponed from the ongoing COVID-19 pandemic. As such, while the qualification period technically closes on 15 June 2021, the current Race to Tokyo rankings list will not now be changed prior to that date, and the current standings are the final standings for the purposes of qualification. Further places may yet be made available, however, by withdrawals.

== Qualifying standards ==
Qualification of these games will be based on the BWF ranking list to be published on 15 June 2021, which will be based on results achieved during the period 29 April 2019 to 15 March 2020, and 4 January 2021 to 13 June 2021, providing a total of 16 pairs in each doubles event, and an initial allocation of 38 players in each singles event in the following criteria:

- Singles:
  - Ranking 1-16: Players are taken in turn. A NOC may enter up to a maximum of 2 players, provided both are ranked in the top 16.
  - Ranking 17 and below: Players are taken in turn. A NOC may enter a maximum of 1 player.
- Doubles:
  - Rankings 1–8: Pairs are taken in turn. A NOC may enter up to a maximum of 2 pairs, provided both pairs are ranked in the top 8.
  - Rankings 9 and below: Pairs are taken in turn. A NOC may enter a maximum of 1 pair.

Each of the five continental confederations will be guaranteed at least one entry in each singles and doubles event (this is called the Continental Representation Place system). If this has not been satisfied by the entry selection method described above, the highest ranked player or pair from the respective continent will qualify. An NOC can qualify players or pairs in a maximum of two events through the Continental Representation Place system; if a NOC qualifies for more than two events through the Continental Representation Place system, the NOC must choose which of them are qualified, and the quota place declined will be offered to the next NOC's eligible player or pair.

Host nation Japan is entitled to enter a male and a female badminton player in each of the singles tournaments, but more than two players may be permitted if they achieve the qualifying regulations. Meanwhile, six quota places are made available to eligible NOCs through the Tripartite Commission Invitation, with three each in the men's and women's singles. The Tripartite Commission invitation places count for the Continental Representation Place system.

For any player who qualifies in both a doubles event and a singles event, an unused quota place will be allocated to the next best ranked eligible athlete of a respective gender in the singles events on the BWF Ranking List as of 15 June 2021. This ensures that a total of 86 men and 86 women qualify, with the individual event fields expanding from 38 to accommodate additional players.

== Qualification summary ==
NOC	Men		Women		Mixed	Total	
NOC	Singles	Doubles	Singles	Doubles	Doubles	Quotas	Athletes
Australia			1	1	1	3	4
Austria	1					1	1
Azerbaijan	1					1	1
Belgium			1			1	1
Brazil	1		1			2	2
Bulgaria			1	1		2	3
Canada	1	1	1	1	1	5	8
China	2	1	2	2	2	9	14
Denmark	2	1	1	1	1	6	9
Egypt			1	1	1	3	3
Estonia	1		1			2	2
Finland	1					1	1
France	1		1		1	3	4
Germany	1	1	1		1	4	5
Great Britain	1	1	1	1	1	5	7
Guatemala	1		1			2	2
Hong Kong	1		1		1	3	4
Hungary	1		1			2	2
India	1	1	1			3	4
Indonesia	2	2	1	1	1	7	11
Iran			1			1	1
Ireland	1					1	1
Israel	1		1			2	2
Japan	2	2	2	2	1	9	13
Malaysia	1	1	1	1	1	5	8
Maldives			1			1	1
Malta	1					1	1
Mauritius	1					1	1
Mexico	1		1			2	2
Myanmar			1			1	1
Netherlands	1			1	1	3	4
Nigeria		1	1			2	3
Pakistan			1			1	1
Peru			1			1	1
Refugee Olympic Team	1					1	1
ROC	1	1	1			3	4
Singapore	1		1			2	2
Slovakia			1			1	1
South Korea	1	1	2	2	1	7	10
Spain	1		1			2	2
Sri Lanka	1					1	1
Sweden	1					1	1
Switzerland			1			1	1
Chinese Taipei	2	1	1			4	5
Thailand	1		2	1	1	5	7
Turkey			1			1	1
Ukraine	1		1			2	2
United States	1	1	1			3	4
Vietnam	1		1			2	2
Total: 49 NOCs	41	16	43	16	16	132	172

== Official ranking ==
All of the event was postponed and rescheduled due to the COVID-19 pandemic.

=== Men's singles ===
As of 18 May 2021
No.	QR	Player	Country	Note
1	1	Kento Momota	Japan	Continental place: Asia
2	2	Chou Tien-chen	Chinese Taipei	
3	3	Anders Antonsen	Denmark	Continental place: Europe
4	4	Viktor Axelsen	Denmark	
5	5	Anthony Sinisuka Ginting	Indonesia	
6	6	Chen Long	China	
7	7	Jonatan Christie	Indonesia	
8	8	Ng Ka Long	Hong Kong	
9	9	Lee Zii Jia	Malaysia	
10	10	Wang Tzu-wei	Chinese Taipei	
11	11	Shi Yuqi	China	
12	12	Kanta Tsuneyama	Japan	
13	13	B. Sai Praneeth	India	
14	14	Kantaphon Wangcharoen	Thailand	
15	31	Heo Kwang-hee	South Korea	
16	34	Brice Leverdez	France	
17	35	Mark Caljouw	Netherlands	
18	36	Loh Kean Yew	Singapore	
19	43	Brian Yang	Canada	Continental place: Pan America
20	44	Pablo Abián	Spain	
21	45	Misha Zilberman	Israel	
22	49	Ygor Coelho	Brazil	
23	52	Toby Penty	Great Britain	
24	53	Felix Burestedt	Sweden	
25	58	Kevin Cordón	Guatemala	
26	60	Nhat Nguyen	Ireland	
27	63	Lino Muñoz	Mexico	
28	64	Kalle Koljonen	Finland	
29	67	Sergey Sirant	ROC	
30	68	Kai Schäfer	Germany	
31	69	Ade Resky Dwicahyo	Azerbaijan	
32	71	Nguyễn Tiến Minh	Vietnam	
33	78	Julien Paul	Mauritius	Continental place: Africa
34	79	Raul Must	Estonia	
	103	Abhinav Manota	New Zealand	Continental place: Oceania (Declined)
35	99	Niluka Karunaratne	Sri Lanka	Tripartite invitation
36	266	Sören Opti	Suriname	Tripartite invitation (withdraw after tested positive of Covid-19)
37	332	Matthew Abela	Malta	Tripartite invitation
38	170	Aram Mahmoud	Refugee Olympic Team	Invitational place
39	82	Luka Wraber	Austria	Reallocation place
40	84	Artem Pochtarov	Ukraine	Reallocation place
41	89	Timothy Lam	United States	Reallocation place
42	91	Gergely Krausz	Hungary	Reallocation place

=== Women's singles ===
As of 18 May 2021
No.	QR	Player	Country	Note
1	1	Chen Yufei	China	Continental place: Asia
2	2	Tai Tzu-ying	Chinese Taipei	
3	3	Nozomi Okuhara	Japan	
—	4	Carolina Marín	Spain	Continental place: Europe (Declined)
4	5	Akane Yamaguchi	Japan	
5	6	Ratchanok Intanon	Thailand	
6	7	P. V. Sindhu	India	
7	8	An Se-young	South Korea	
8	9	He Bingjiao	China	
9	10	Michelle Li	Canada	Continental place: Pan America
10	12	Busanan Ongbamrungphan	Thailand	
11	14	Beiwen Zhang	United States	
12	16	Kim Ga-eun	South Korea	
13	18	Mia Blichfeldt	Denmark	
14	20	Gregoria Mariska Tunjung	Indonesia	
15	23	Evgeniya Kosetskaya	ROC	
16	25	Yeo Jia Min	Singapore	
17	26	Kirsty Gilmour	Great Britain	
18	27	Soniia Cheah Su Ya	Malaysia	
19	29	Neslihan Yiğit	Turkey	
20	34	Cheung Ngan Yi	Hong Kong	
21	37	Qi Xuefei	France	
22	41	Yvonne Li	Germany	
23	42	Lianne Tan	Belgium	
24	47	Nguyễn Thùy Linh	Vietnam	
25	50	Sabrina Jaquet	Switzerland	
26	52	Ksenia Polikarpova	Israel	
27	54	Kristin Kuuba	Estonia	
28	56	Thet Htar Thuzar	Myanmar	
—	58	Soraya de Visch Eijbergen	Netherlands	Declined
29	61	Laura Sárosi	Hungary	
30	62	Linda Zetchiri	Bulgaria	
31	63	Chen Hsuan-yu	Australia	Continental place: Oceania
—	67	Jordan Hart	Poland	Ineligible
—	68	Airi Mikkelä	Finland	Declined
32	70	Daniela Macías	Peru	
33	71	Dorcas Ajoke Adesokan	Nigeria	Continental place: Africa
34	72	Martina Repiská	Slovakia	
35	69	Fabiana Silva	Brazil	Reallocation from tripartite slot
36	76	Haramara Gaitan	Mexico	
37	121	Mahoor Shahzad	Pakistan	Tripartite invitation
38	221	Fathimath Nabaaha Abdul Razzaq	Maldives	Tripartite invitation
39	83	Marija Ulitina	Ukraine	Reallocation place
40	87	Clara Azurmendi	Spain	Reallocation place
41	94	Nikté Sotomayor	Guatemala	Reallocation place
42	98	Doha Hany	Egypt	Reallocation place
43	99	Sorayya Aghaei	Iran	Reallocation place

Players highlighted in red states they are not participating at the 2020 Olympics

=== Men's doubles ===
As of 18 May 2021
No.	QR	Player	Country	Note
1	1	Marcus Fernaldi Gideon	Indonesia	Continental place: Asia
1	1	Kevin Sanjaya Sukamuljo	Indonesia	Continental place: Asia
2	2	Mohammad Ahsan	Indonesia	
2	2	Hendra Setiawan	Indonesia	
3	3	Li Junhui	China	
3	3	Liu Yuchen	China	
4	4	Hiroyuki Endo	Japan	
4	4	Yuta Watanabe	Japan	
5	5	Takeshi Kamura	Japan	
5	5	Keigo Sonoda	Japan	
6	7	Lee Yang	Chinese Taipei	
6	7	Wang Chi-lin	Chinese Taipei	
7	8	Choi Sol-gyu	South Korea	
7	8	Seo Seung-jae	South Korea	
8	9	Satwiksairaj Rankireddy	India	
8	9	Chirag Shetty	India	
9	10	Aaron Chia	Malaysia	
9	10	Soh Wooi Yik	Malaysia	
10	11	Kim Astrup	Denmark	Continental place: Europe
10	11	Anders Skaarup Rasmussen	Denmark	Continental place: Europe
11	15	Mark Lamsfuß	Germany	
11	15	Marvin Seidel	Germany	
12	18	Vladimir Ivanov	ROC	
12	18	Ivan Sozonov	ROC	
—	19	Marcus Ellis	Great Britain	Declined
—	19	Chris Langridge	Great Britain	Declined
13	25	Ben Lane	Great Britain	Selected by the national association (Note: Badminton England announced that Lane and Vendy who will representing Great Britain in the men's doubles.)
13	25	Sean Vendy	Great Britain	Selected by the national association
14	32	Jason Ho-shue	Canada	Continental place: Pan America
14	32	Nyl Yakura	Canada	Continental place: Pan America
—	36	Jelle Maas	Netherlands	Declined
—	36	Robin Tabeling	Netherlands	Declined
15	37	Phillip Chew	United States	Reallocation place
15	37	Ryan Chew	United States	Reallocation place
16	44	Godwin Olofua	Nigeria	Continental place: Africa
16	44	Anuoluwapo Juwon Opeyori	Nigeria	Continental place: Africa

Pairs highlighted in red states they are not participating at the 2020 Olympics

=== Women's doubles ===
As of 18 May 2021
No.	QR	Player	Country	Note
1	1	Yuki Fukushima	Japan	Continental place: Asia
1	1	Sayaka Hirota	Japan	Continental place: Asia
2	2	Chen Qingchen	China	
2	2	Jia Yifan	China	
3	3	Mayu Matsumoto	Japan	
3	3	Wakana Nagahara	Japan	
4	4	Lee So-hee	South Korea	
4	4	Shin Seung-chan	South Korea	
5	5	Kim So-yeong	South Korea	
5	5	Kong Hee-yong	South Korea	
6	6	Du Yue	China	
6	6	Li Yinhui	China	
7	7	Greysia Polii	Indonesia	
7	7	Apriyani Rahayu	Indonesia	
8	11	Gabriela Stoeva	Bulgaria	Continental place: Europe
8	11	Stefani Stoeva	Bulgaria	Continental place: Europe
9	12	Jongkolphan Kititharakul	Thailand	
9	12	Rawinda Prajongjai	Thailand	
10	14	Chow Mei Kuan	Malaysia	
10	14	Lee Meng Yean	Malaysia	
11	15	Maiken Fruergaard	Denmark	
11	15	Sara Thygesen	Denmark	
12	16	Chloe Birch	Great Britain	
12	16	Lauren Smith	Great Britain	
13	17	Selena Piek	Netherlands	
13	17	Cheryl Seinen	Netherlands	
14	18	Rachel Honderich	Canada	Continental place: Pan America
14	18	Kristen Tsai	Canada	Continental place: Pan America
15	23	Setyana Mapasa	Australia	Continental place: Oceania
15	23	Gronya Somerville	Australia	Continental place: Oceania
16	40	Doha Hany	Egypt	Continental place: Africa
16	40	Hadia Hosny	Egypt	Continental place: Africa

=== Mixed doubles ===
As of 18 May 2021
No.	QR	Player	Country	Note
1	1	Zheng Siwei	China	Continental place: Asia
1	1	Huang Yaqiong	China	Continental place: Asia
2	2	Wang Yilyu	China	
2	2	Huang Dongping	China	
3	3	Dechapol Puavaranukroh	Thailand	
3	3	Sapsiree Taerattanachai	Thailand	
4	4	Praveen Jordan	Indonesia	
4	4	Melati Daeva Oktavianti	Indonesia	
5	5	Yuta Watanabe	Japan	
5	5	Arisa Higashino	Japan	
6	6	Seo Seung-jae	South Korea	
6	6	Chae Yoo-jung	South Korea	
7	7	Chan Peng Soon	Malaysia	
7	7	Goh Liu Ying	Malaysia	
8	8	Marcus Ellis	Great Britain	Continental place: Europe
8	8	Lauren Smith	Great Britain	Continental place: Europe
9	10	Tang Chun Man	Hong Kong	
9	10	Tse Ying Suet	Hong Kong	
10	14	Thom Gicquel	France	
10	14	Delphine Delrue	France	
11	15	Robin Tabeling	Netherlands	
11	15	Selena Piek	Netherlands	
12	16	Mark Lamsfuß	Germany	
12	16	Isabel Herttrich	Germany	
13	17	Mathias Christiansen	Denmark	
13	17	Alexandra Bøje	Denmark	
14	31	Joshua Hurlburt-Yu	Canada	Continental place: Pan America
14	31	Josephine Wu	Canada	Continental place: Pan America
15	44	Adham Hatem Elgamal	Egypt	Continental place: Africa
15	44	Doha Hany	Egypt	Continental place: Africa
16	48	Simon Leung	Australia	Continental place: Oceania
16	48	Gronya Somerville	Australia	Continental place: Oceania
