= Badminton at the 2023 European Games – Men's doubles =

Badminton's Men's doubles at the 2023 European Games
- Venue: Arena Jaskółka, Tarnów
- Dates: 26 June - 1 July
- Competitors: 32 from 16 nations

Medalists
gold medal	Kim Astrup; Anders Skaarup Rasmussen	Denmark
silver medal	Ben Lane; Sean Vendy	Great Britain
bronze medal	Alexander Dunn; Adam Hall	Great Britain
bronze medal	Christo Popov; Toma Junior Popov	France

The men's doubles badminton tournament at the 2023 European Games was played from 26 June to 1 July 2023 in Arena Jaskółka, Tarnów. A total of 32 players in 16 pairs competed at the tournament, four of which pairs was seeded.

== Competition format ==
The tournament starts with a group phase round-robin which will eliminate 8 pairs, followed by a single-elimination knockout stage. For the group stage, the players are divided into four groups of four. Each group plays a round-robin. The top two pairs in each group advanced to the knockout rounds. The knockout stage is a three-round single elimination tournament without a bronze medal match.

Matches are played best-of-three games. Each game is played to 21, except that a player must win by 2 unless the score reaches 30–29.

== Seeding ==
The following pairs were seeded

1. (Denmark) Kim Astrup / Anders Skaarup Rasmussen (Gold medalists)
2. (United Kingdom) Ben Lane / Sean Vendy (Silver medalists)
3. (Germany) Mark Lamsfuß / Marvin Seidel (Quarter-finals)
4. (United Kingdom) Alexander Dunn / Adam Hall (Bronze medalists)

== Competition schedule ==
GS	Group stage	R16	Round of 16	¼	Quarterfinals	½	Semifinals	F	Final

Events	Mon 26	Tue 27	Wed 28	Thu 29	Fri 30	Sat 1	Sun 2
Men's doubles	GS	GS	GS	¼	½	F	

== Pool Stage ==
=== Group A ===
Pos	Team	Pld	W	L	GF	GA	GD	PF	PA	PD	Qualification
1	Kim Astrup (DEN) [1] Anders Skaarup Rasmussen (DEN)	3	3	0	6	0	+6	126	55	+71	Qualification to knock-out stage
2	Ruben Jille (NED) Ties van der Lecq (NED)	3	2	1	4	2	+2	103	90	+13	Qualification to knock-out stage
3	Torjus Flåtten (NOR) Vegard Rikheim (NOR)	3	1	2	2	5	−3	105	132	−27	
4	Davíð Bjarni Björnsson (ISL) Kristófer Darri Finnsson (ISL)	3	0	3	1	6	−5	87	144	−57	

Date		Score		Game 1	Game 2	Game 3
26 June	Ruben Jille (Netherlands); Ties van der Lecq (Netherlands)	2–0	(Iceland) Davíð Bjarni Björnsson (Iceland) Kristófer Darri Finnsson	21–7	21–14	
26 June	Kim Astrup (Denmark); Anders Skaarup Rasmussen (Denmark)	2–0	(Norway) Torjus Flåtten (Norway) Vegard Rikheim	21–10	21–8	
27 June	Kim Astrup (Denmark); Anders Skaarup Rasmussen (Denmark)	2–0	(Iceland) Davíð Bjarni Björnsson (Iceland) Kristófer Darri Finnsson	21–9	21–9	
27 June	Ruben Jille (Netherlands); Ties van der Lecq (Netherlands)	2–0	(Norway) Torjus Flåtten (Norway) Vegard Rikheim	21–17	21–10	
28 June	Kim Astrup (Denmark); Anders Skaarup Rasmussen (Denmark)	2–0	(Netherlands) Ruben Jille (Netherlands) Ties van der Lecq	21–9	21–10	
28 June	Davíð Bjarni Björnsson (Iceland); Kristófer Darri Finnsson (Iceland)	1–2	(Norway) Torjus Flåtten (Norway) Vegard Rikheim	21–18	14–21	13–21

=== Group B ===
Pos	Team	Pld	W	L	GF	GA	GD	PF	PA	PD	Qualification
1	Ben Lane (GBR) [2] Sean Vendy (GBR)	3	3	0	6	0	+6	126	74	+52	Qualification to knock-out stage
2	Joshua Magee (IRL) Paul Reynolds (IRL)	3	1	2	3	4	−1	123	132	−9	Qualification to knock-out stage
3	Ade Resky Dwicahyo (AZE) Azmy Qowimuramadhoni (AZE)	3	1	2	3	5	−2	134	152	−18	
4	Giovanni Greco (ITA) David Salutt (ITA)	3	1	2	2	5	−3	114	139	−25	

Date		Score		Game 1	Game 2	Game 3
26 June	Ben Lane (United Kingdom); Sean Vendy (United Kingdom)	2–0	(Azerbaijan) Ade Resky Dwicahyo (Azerbaijan) Azmy Qowimuramadhoni	21–8	21–10	
26 June	Giovanni Greco (Italy); David Salutt (Italy)	0–2	(Republic of Ireland) Joshua Magee (Republic of Ireland) Paul Reynolds	17–21	12–21	
27 June	Giovanni Greco (Italy); David Salutt (Italy)	2–1	(Azerbaijan) Ade Resky Dwicahyo (Azerbaijan) Azmy Qowimuramadhoni	21–17	17–21	21–17
27 June	Ben Lane (United Kingdom); Sean Vendy (United Kingdom)	2–0	(Republic of Ireland) Joshua Magee (Republic of Ireland) Paul Reynolds	21–15	21–15	
28 June	Joshua Magee (Republic of Ireland); Paul Reynolds (Republic of Ireland)	1–2	(Azerbaijan) Ade Resky Dwicahyo (Azerbaijan) Azmy Qowimuramadhoni	21–19	14–21	16–21
28 June	Ben Lane (United Kingdom); Sean Vendy (United Kingdom)	2–0	(Italy) Giovanni Greco (Italy) David Salutt	21–10	21–16	

=== Group C ===
Pos	Team	Pld	W	L	GF	GA	GD	PF	PA	PD	Qualification
1	Mark Lamsfuß (GER) [3] Marvin Seidel (GER)	3	3	0	6	1	+5	144	96	+48	Qualification to knock-out stage
2	Joel Hansson (SWE) Melker Z-Bexell (SWE)	3	2	1	4	2	+2	118	92	+26	Qualification to knock-out stage
3	Ivan Rusev (BUL) Iliyan Stoynov (BUL)	3	1	2	3	4	−1	117	123	−6	
4	Glib Beketov (UKR) Mykhaylo Makhnovskiy (UKR)	3	0	3	0	6	−6	58	126	−68	

Date		Score		Game 1	Game 2	Game 3
26 June	Mark Lamsfuß (Germany); Marvin Seidel (Germany)	2–0	(Sweden) Joel Hansson (Sweden) Melker Z-Bexell	21–16	21–18	
26 June	Glib Beketov (Ukraine); Mykhaylo Makhnovskiy (Ukraine)	0–2	(Bulgaria) Ivan Rusev (Bulgaria) Iliyan Stoynov	9–21	12–21	
27 June	Mark Lamsfuß (Germany); Marvin Seidel (Germany)	2–1	(Bulgaria) Ivan Rusev (Bulgaria) Iliyan Stoynov	21–17	18–21	21–8
27 June	Glib Beketov (Ukraine); Mykhaylo Makhnovskiy (Ukraine)	0–2	(Sweden) Joel Hansson (Sweden) Melker Z-Bexell	10–21	11–21	
28 June	Mark Lamsfuß (Germany); Marvin Seidel (Germany)	2–0	(Ukraine) Glib Beketov (Ukraine) Mykhaylo Makhnovskiy	21–7	21–9	
28 June	Ivan Rusev (Bulgaria); Iliyan Stoynov (Bulgaria)	0–2	(Sweden) Joel Hansson (Sweden) Melker Z-Bexell	12–21	17–21	

=== Group D ===
Pos	Team	Pld	W	L	GF	GA	GD	PF	PA	PD	Qualification
1	Alexander Dunn (GBR) [4] Adam Hall (GBR)	3	2	1	5	2	+3	146	106	+40	Qualification to knock-out stage
2	Christo Popov (FRA) Toma Junior Popov (FRA)	3	2	1	4	3	+1	129	117	+12	Qualification to knock-out stage
3	Ondřej Král (CZE) Adam Mendrek (CZE)	3	1	2	2	4	−2	90	118	−28	
4	Miłosz Bochat (POL) Robert Cybulski (POL)	3	1	2	3	5	−2	138	162	−24	

Date		Score		Game 1	Game 2	Game 3
26 June	Miłosz Bochat (Poland); Robert Cybulski (Poland)	1–2	(France) Christo Popov (France) Toma Junior Popov	13–21	21–16	14–21
26 June	Alexander Dunn (United Kingdom); Adam Hall (United Kingdom)	2–0	(Czech Republic) Ondřej Král (Czech Republic) Adam Mendrek	21–7	21–14	
27 June	Alexander Dunn (United Kingdom); Adam Hall (United Kingdom)	2–0	(France) Christo Popov (France) Toma Junior Popov	21–13	21–16	
27 June	Miłosz Bochat (Poland); Robert Cybulski (Poland)	0–2	(Czech Republic) Ondřej Král (Czech Republic) Adam Mendrek	16–21	18–21	
28 June	Christo Popov (France); Toma Junior Popov (France)	2–0	(Czech Republic) Ondřej Král (Czech Republic) Adam Mendrek	21–12	21–15	
28 June	Alexander Dunn (United Kingdom); Adam Hall (United Kingdom)	1–2	(Poland) Miłosz Bochat (Poland) Robert Cybulski	21–11	22–24	19–21

== Knockout stage ==
The 8 surviving pairs will be drawn in a single elimination tournament, with group winners paired in the quarter final with runners up from other groups. There will be no bronze medal match, and both losing semi-finalists will win a bronze medal.

Quarter finals
1	Kim Astrup (DEN); Anders Skaarup Rasmussen (DEN)	21	21
Joshua Magee (IRL); Paul Reynolds (IRL)	16	15
4	Alexander Dunn (GBR); Adam Hall (GBR)	21	21
Joel Hansson (SWE); Melker Z-Bexell (SWE)	11	12
Christo Popov (FRA); Toma Junior Popov (FRA)	18	21	17
3	Mark Lamsfuß (GER); Marvin Seidel (GER)	21	11	10^{r}
Ruben Jille (NED); Ties van der Lecq (NED)	15	15
2	Ben Lane (GBR); Sean Vendy (GBR)	21	21

Semi finals
1	Kim Astrup (DEN); Anders Skaarup Rasmussen (DEN)	21	16	21
4	Alexander Dunn (GBR); Adam Hall (GBR)	13	21	10
Christo Popov (FRA); Toma Junior Popov (FRA)	15	14
2	Ben Lane (GBR); Sean Vendy (GBR)	21	21

Gold medal match
1	Kim Astrup (DEN); Anders Skaarup Rasmussen (DEN)	21	19	21
2	Ben Lane (GBR); Sean Vendy (GBR)	15	21	19
