= Alex Lane =

English badminton player (born 1995)

Personal information
- Born: 29 August 1995 (age 31) Kingston, Surrey
- Height: 1.80 m (5 ft 11 in)

Sport
- Country: England
- Sport: Badminton
- Handedness: Right

Men's singles
- Highest ranking: 98 (11 June 2019)
- Current ranking: 107 (7 October 2019)
- BWF profile
Medal record
Men's badminton
Representing England
European Men's Team Championships
Silver medal – second place	2014 Basel	Men's team
Bronze medal – third place	2016 Kazan	Men's team

Alex Lane (born 29 August 1995) is a male English badminton player from Kingston, Surrey.

== Badminton career ==
Alex won the singles European Under 17 Junior Gold in 2001. He won his first senior international title at the 2015 Slovak Open in the men's singles event.

== Personal life ==
His mother is Suzanne Louis-Lane, father Richard Lane and brother is Ben Lane.

== Achievements ==
=== BWF International Challenge/Series ===
Men's singles
Year	Tournament	Opponent	Score	Result
2019	Cyprus International	(Republic of Ireland) Jonathan Dolan	4–15 Retired	(silver) Runner-up
2018	Welsh International	(Spain) Luis Enrique Peñalver	19–21, 20–22	(silver) Runner-up
2015	Slovak Open	(Finland) Henri Aarnio	21–15, 21–9	(gold) Winner

BWF International Challenge tournament
BWF International Series tournament
BWF Future Series tournament
