= Sean Vendy =

English badminton player (born 1996)

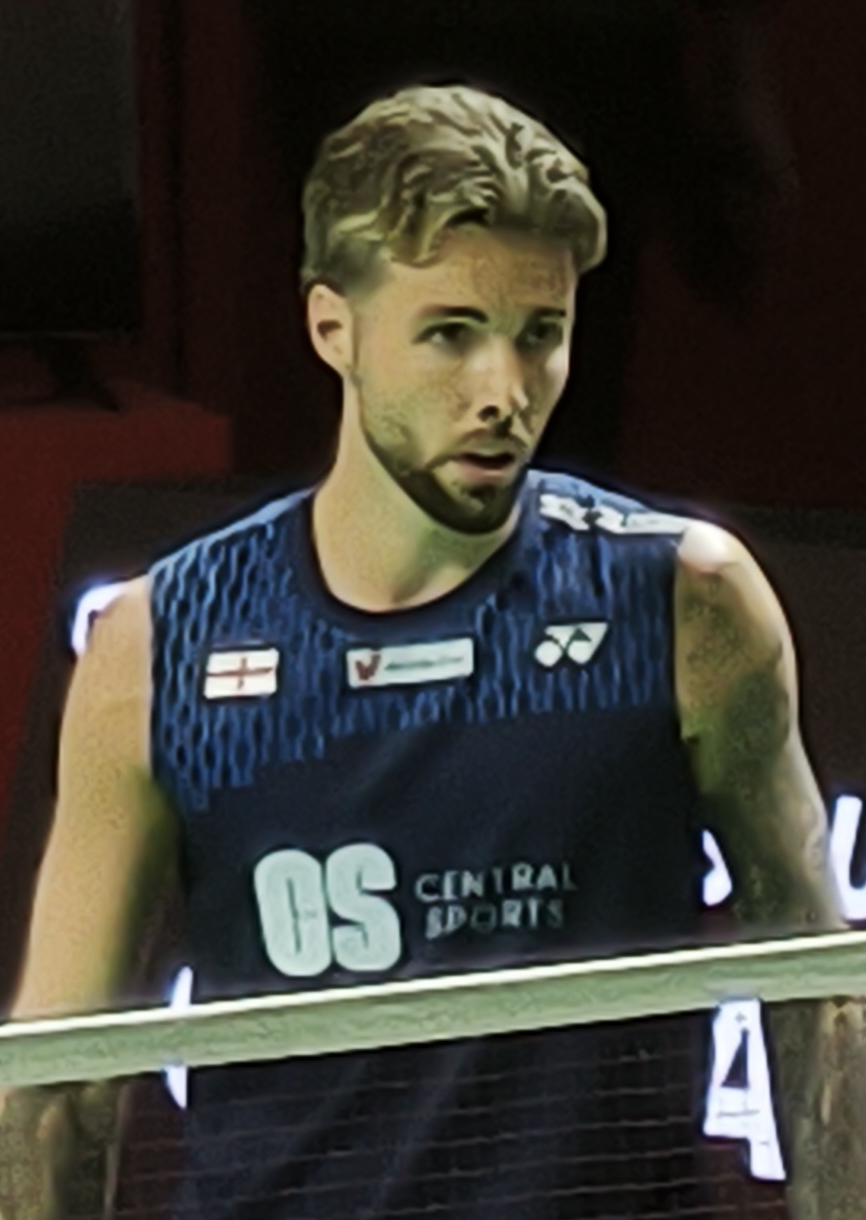
- Vendy at the 2026 Indonesia Open

Personal information
- Born: 18 May 1996 (age 30) Kirkwall, Orkney Islands, Scotland
- Height: 1.81 m (5 ft 11 in)

Sport
- Country: England
- Sport: Badminton
- Handedness: Right

Men's & mixed doubles
- Highest ranking: 8 (MD with Ben Lane, 25 August 2026); 218 (XD with Sarah Walker, 5 April 2018)
- Current ranking: 8 (MD with Ben Lane, 10 November 2026)
- BWF profile
Medal record
Men's badminton
Representing United Kingdom
European Games
Silver medal – second place	2023 Kraków–Małopolska	Men's doubles
Representing England
Commonwealth Games
Silver medal – second place	2022 Birmingham	Men's doubles
European Championships
Gold medal – first place	2026 Huelva	Men's doubles
Bronze medal – third place	2022 Madrid	Men's doubles
Bronze medal – third place	2024 Saarbrücken	Men's doubles
European Mixed Team Championships
Bronze medal – third place	2023 Aire-sur-la-Lys	Mixed team
Bronze medal – third place	2025 Baku	Mixed team
European Men's Team Championships
Silver medal – second place	2018 Kazan	Men's team
Bronze medal – third place	2024 Łódź	Men's team
Bronze medal – third place	2026 Istanbul	Men's team
European Junior Championships
Silver medal – second place	2015 Lubin	Boys' doubles
Silver medal – second place	2015 Lubin	Mixed team

Sean Vendy (born 18 May 1996) is a badminton player from England. He started playing badminton at aged 5 in Orkney, then moved to England at 7. He became part of the England national badminton team in May 2015. In 2022, he partnered with Ben Lane won a silver medal at the Commonwealth Games and a bronze medal in the European Championships. Vendy and Lane finally won the European Championship in 2026.

== Career ==
In 2021, Vendy claimed his first World Tour title at the Orléans Masters, after in the final he and Ben Lane beat Indian pair Krishna Prasad Garaga and Vishnuvardhan Goud Panjala. Vendy competed at the 2020 Summer Olympics partnered with Lane in the men's doubles, but the duo was eliminated in the group stage.

In 2022, Vendy won the men's doubles bronze medal at the Madrid European Championships with Ben Lane, after in the semi-finals they were defeated by German pair Mark Lamsfuß and Marvin Seidel. In August, he competed at the Commonwealth Games, and won a silver medal with Lane in the men's doubles. In 2023, he won his third national doubles title at the English National Badminton Championships, at the David Ross Sports Village in Nottingham. The following year, Vendy successfully defended the title and claimed his fourth national title (all with Ben Lane).

Vendy and Lane went out in the opening group stages at the 2024 Summer Olympics.

== Achievements ==
=== Commonwealth Games ===
Men's doubles
Year	Venue	Partner	Opponent	Score	Result	Ref.
2022	National Exhibition Centre, Birmingham, England	(England) Ben Lane	(India) Satwiksairaj Rankireddy (India) Chirag Shetty	15–21, 13–21	Silver	

=== European Games ===
Men's doubles
Year	Venue	Partner	Opponent	Score	Result
2023	Arena Jaskółka; Tarnów, Poland	(United Kingdom) Ben Lane	(Denmark) Kim Astrup (Denmark) Anders Skaarup Rasmussen	15–21, 21–19, 19–21	Silver

=== European Championships ===
Men's doubles
Year	Venue	Partner	Opponent	Score	Result	Ref.
2022	Polideportivo Municipal Gallur, Madrid, Spain	(England) Ben Lane	(Germany) Mark Lamsfuß (Germany) Marvin Seidel	21–23, 17–21	Bronze	
2024	Saarlandhalle, Saarbrücken, Germany	(England) Ben Lane	(Denmark) Kim Astrup (Denmark) Anders Skaarup Rasmussen	19–21, 7–21	Bronze	
2026	Palacio de los Deportes Carolina Marín, Huelva, Spain	(England) Ben Lane	(France) Christo Popov (France) Toma Junior Popov	21–15, 21–16	Gold	

=== European Junior Championships ===
Boys' doubles
Year	Venue	Partner	Opponent	Score	Result
2015	Regional Sport Centrum Hall; Lubin, Poland	(England) Ben Lane	(Denmark) Alexander Bond (Denmark) Joel Eipe	15–21, 24–22, 16–21	Silver

=== BWF World Tour (4 titles, 2 runners-up) ===
The BWF World Tour, which was announced on 19 March 2017 and implemented in 2018, is a series of elite badminton tournaments sanctioned by the Badminton World Federation (BWF). The BWF World Tour is divided into levels of World Tour Finals, Super 1000, Super 750, Super 500, Super 300 (part of the HSBC World Tour), and the BWF Tour Super 100.

Men's doubles

Year	Tournament	Partner	Level	Opponent	Score	Result	Ref
2021	Orléans Masters	Super 100	(England) Ben Lane	(India) Krishna Prasad Garaga (India) Vishnuvardhan Goud Panjala	19–21, 21–14, 21–19	(gold) Winner	
2024	Swiss Open	Super 300	(England) Ben Lane	(Indonesia) Muhammad Shohibul Fikri (Indonesia) Bagas Maulana	24–22, 28–26	(gold) Winner	
2024	Canada Open	Super 500	(England) Ben Lane	(Denmark) Kim Astrup (Denmark) Anders Skaarup Rasmussen	21–18, 14–21, 11–21	(silver) Runner-up	
2024	Hylo Open	Super 300	(England) Ben Lane	(Denmark) Rasmus Kjær (Denmark) Frederik Søgaard	18–21, 21–15, 21–18	(gold) Winner	
2025	Arctic Open	Super 500	(England) Ben Lane	(Malaysia) Aaron Chia (Malaysia) Soh Wooi Yik	21–18, 25–27, 21–17	(gold) Winner	
2026	Hylo Open	Super 500	(England) Ben Lane	(Denmark) Christian Faust Kjær (Denmark) Rasmus Kjær	14–21, 18–21	(silver) Runner-up	

=== BWF International Challenge/Series (3 titles, 4 runners-up) ===
Men's doubles
Year	Tournament	Partner	Opponent	Score	Result
2014	Slovak Open	(England) Ben Lane	(Czech Republic) Pavel Drančák (Czech Republic) Jaromír Janáček	11–10, 11–5, 11–10	(gold) Winner
2016	Iceland International	(England) Ben Lane	(England) Christopher Coles (Scotland) Adam Hall	19–21, 19–21	(silver) Runner-up
2017	Czech Open	(England) Ben Lane	(Poland) Miłosz Bochat (Poland) Adam Cwalina	18–21, 21–23	(silver) Runner-up
2019	Polish Open	(England) Ben Lane	(Chinese Taipei) Lee Jhe-huei (Chinese Taipei) Yang Po-hsuan	19–21, 16–21	(silver) Runner-up
2019	Denmark International	(England) Ben Lane	(Japan) Shohei Hoshino (Japan) Yujiro Nishikawa	21–4, 20–22, 18–21	(silver) Runner-up
2019	Kharkiv International	(England) Ben Lane	(England) Marcus Ellis (England) Chris Langridge	21–19, 21–18	(gold) Winner
2019	Belgian International	(England) Ben Lane	(Germany) Bjarne Geiss (Germany) Jan Colin Völker	21–11, 21–14	(gold) Winner

BWF International Challenge tournament
BWF International Series tournament
BWF Future Series tournament
