= Ben Lane =

English badminton player

Personal information
- Born: Benjamin Lane; 13 July 1997 (age 29) Kingston, Surrey, England
- Height: 1.75 m (5 ft 9 in)
- Weight: 70 kg (154 lb)

Sport
- Country: England
- Sport: Badminton
- Handedness: Left

Men's & mixed doubles
- Highest ranking: 8 (MD with Sean Vendy, 25 August 2026); 21 (XD with Jessica Pugh, 28 June 2018)
- Current ranking: 8 (MD with Sean Vendy, 10 November 2026)
- BWF profile
Medal record
Men's badminton
Representing United Kingdom
European Games
Silver medal – second place	2023 Kraków–Małopolska	Men's doubles
Representing England
Commonwealth Games
Silver medal – second place	2022 Birmingham	Men's doubles
Bronze medal – third place	2018 Gold Coast	Mixed team
European Championships
Gold medal – first place	2026 Huelva	Men's doubles
Bronze medal – third place	2022 Madrid	Men's doubles
Bronze medal – third place	2024 Saarbrücken	Men's doubles
European Mixed Team Championships
Bronze medal – third place	2023 Aire-sur-la-Lys	Mixed team
Bronze medal – third place	2025 Baku	Mixed team
European Men's Team Championships
Silver medal – second place	2018 Kazan	Men's team
Bronze medal – third place	2024 Łódź	Men's team
Bronze medal – third place	2026 Istanbul	Men's team
European Junior Championships
Silver medal – second place	2015 Lubin	Boys' doubles
Silver medal – second place	2015 Lubin	Mixed team
Bronze medal – third place	2015 Lubin	Mixed doubles

Benjamin Lane (born 13 July 1997) is an English badminton player. He won the men's doubles silver medals at the 2022 Commonwealth Games, 2023 European Games, and also a bronze medal in the European Championships. Lane and his usual partner, Sean Vendy finally won the European Championship in 2026.

== Personal life ==
Ben's mother Suzanne Louis-Lane, represented England in badminton and had won the women's singles title at the National Championships in 1993 and 1994. His older brother, Alex, represented England in badminton and won the men's singles at the 2017 National Championships.

Lane was educated at Exmouth Community College.

== Career ==
Lane started playing badminton at aged nine, and in his junior career, he had won the U-17 European Championships in the boys' and mixed doubles event in 2014. He also won two silvers and a bronze medal at the 2015 European Junior Championships. Lane was part of the English team that won the mixed team bronze at the 2018 Commonwealth Games in Gold Coast.

In 2021, Lane claimed his first World Tour title at the Orléans Masters, after in the final they beat Indian pair Krishna Prasad Garaga and Vishnu Vardhan Goud Panjala. Lane competed at the 2020 Summer Olympics, but was eliminated in the group stage.

In 2022, Lane won the men's doubles bronze medal at the Madrid European Championships with Sean Vendy, after they were defeated by German pair Mark Lamsfuß and Marvin Seidel in the semi-finals. In August, Lane made his second appearance in the Commonwealth Games, and won a silver medal with Vendy in the men's doubles.

In 2023, Lane partnering Sean Vendy captured the silver medal in the men's doubles at the 2023 European Games. In 2023, he also won his fifth national doubles title at the English National Badminton Championships, at the David Ross Sports Village in Nottingham. The following year, Lane successfully defended the title for a sixth national title.

Lane and Vendy went out in the opening group stages at the 2024 Summer Olympics.

== Achievements ==
=== Commonwealth Games ===
Men's doubles
Year	Venue	Partner	Opponent	Score	Result	Ref.
2022	National Exhibition Centre; Birmingham, England	(England) Sean Vendy	(India) Satwiksairaj Rankireddy (India) Chirag Shetty	15–21, 13–21	Silver	

=== European Games ===
Men's doubles
Year	Venue	Partner	Opponent	Score	Result	Ref.
2023	Arena Jaskółka; Tarnów, Poland	(United Kingdom) Sean Vendy	(Denmark) Kim Astrup (Denmark) Anders Skaarup Rasmussen	15–21, 21–19, 19–21	Silver	

=== European Championships ===
Men's doubles
Year	Venue	Partner	Opponent	Score	Result	Ref.
2022	Polideportivo Municipal Gallur, Madrid, Spain	(England) Sean Vendy	(Germany) Mark Lamsfuß (Germany) Marvin Seidel	21–23, 17–21	Bronze	
2024	Saarlandhalle, Saarbrücken, Germany	(England) Sean Vendy	(Denmark) Kim Astrup (Denmark) Anders Skaarup Rasmussen	19–21, 7–21	Bronze	
2026	Palacio de los Deportes Carolina Marín, Huelva, Spain	(England) Sean Vendy	(France) Christo Popov (France) Toma Junior Popov	21–15, 21–16	Gold	

=== European Junior Championships ===
Boys' doubles
Year	Venue	Partner	Opponent	Score	Result
2015	Regional Sport Centrum Hall; Lubin, Poland	(England) Sean Vendy	(Denmark) Alexander Bond (Denmark) Joel Eipe	15–21, 24–22, 16–21	Silver

Mixed doubles
Year	Venue	Partner	Opponent	Score	Result
2015	Regional Sport Centrum Hall; Lubin, Poland	(England) Jessica Pugh	(Denmark) Frederik Søgaard (Denmark) Sara Lundgaard	16–21, 21–23	Bronze

=== BWF World Tour (4 titles, 2 runners-up) ===
The BWF World Tour, which was announced on 19 March 2017 and implemented in 2018, is a series of elite badminton tournaments sanctioned by the Badminton World Federation (BWF). The BWF World Tour is divided into levels of World Tour Finals, Super 1000, Super 750, Super 500, Super 300 (part of the HSBC World Tour), and the BWF Tour Super 100.

Men's doubles
Year	Tournament	Level	Partner	Opponent	Score	Result	Ref.
2021	Orléans Masters	Super 100	(England) Sean Vendy	(India) Krishna Prasad Garaga (India) Vishnu Vardhan Goud Panjala	19–21, 21–14, 21–19	(gold) Winner	
2024	Swiss Open	Super 300	(England) Sean Vendy	(Indonesia) Muhammad Shohibul Fikri (Indonesia) Bagas Maulana	24–22, 28–26	(gold) Winner	
2024	Canada Open	Super 500	(England) Sean Vendy	(Denmark) Kim Astrup (Denmark) Anders Skaarup Rasmussen	21–18, 14–21, 11–21	(silver) Runner-up	
2024	Hylo Open	Super 300	(England) Sean Vendy	(Denmark) Rasmus Kjær (Denmark) Frederik Søgaard	18–21, 21–15, 21–18	(gold) Winner	
2025	Arctic Open	Super 500	(England) Sean Vendy	(Malaysia) Aaron Chia (Malaysia) Soh Wooi Yik	21–18, 25–27, 21–17	(gold) Winner	
2026	Hylo Open	Super 500	(England) Sean Vendy	(Denmark) Christian Faust Kjær (Denmark) Rasmus Kjær	13–21, 18–21	(silver) Runner-up	

=== BWF International Challenge/Series (10 titles, 5 runners-up) ===
Men's doubles
Year	Tournament	Partner	Opponent	Score	Result
2014	Slovak Open	(England) Sean Vendy	(Czech Republic) Pavel Drančák (Czech Republic) Jaromír Janáček	11–10, 11–5, 11–10	(gold) Winner
2016	Iceland International	(England) Sean Vendy	(England) Christopher Coles (Scotland) Adam Hall	19–21, 19–21	(silver) Runner-up
2017	Czech Open	(England) Sean Vendy	(Poland) Miłosz Bochat (Poland) Adam Cwalina	18–21, 21–23	(silver) Runner-up
2019	Polish Open	(England) Sean Vendy	(Chinese Taipei) Lee Jhe-huei (Chinese Taipei) Yang Po-hsuan	19–21, 16–21	(silver) Runner-up
2019	Denmark International	(England) Sean Vendy	(Japan) Shohei Hoshino (Japan) Yujiro Nishikawa	21–4, 20–22, 18–21	(silver) Runner-up
2019	Kharkiv International	(England) Sean Vendy	(England) Marcus Ellis (England) Chris Langridge	21–19, 21–18	(gold) Winner
2019	Belgian International	(England) Sean Vendy	(Germany) Bjarne Geiss (Germany) Jan Colin Völker	21–11, 21–14	(gold) Winner

Mixed doubles
Year	Tournament	Partner	Opponent	Score	Result
2014	Hungarian International	(England) Jessica Pugh	(Czech Republic) Jakub Bitman (Czech Republic) Alžběta Bášová	11–4, 11–10, 11–7	(gold) Winner
2015	Slovak Open	(England) Jessica Pugh	(Vietnam) Đỗ Tuấn Đức (Vietnam) Phạm Như Thảo	18–21, 21–13, 21–12	(gold) Winner
2016	Dutch International	(England) Jessica Pugh	(Denmark) Alexander Bond (Denmark) Ditte Søby Hansen	21–19, 21–23, 18–21	(silver) Runner-up
2016	Spanish International	(England) Jessica Pugh	(France) Gaëtan Mittelheisser (France) Émilie Lefel	21–18, 16–21, 16–21	(gold) Winner
2017	Italian International	(England) Jessica Pugh	(England) Marcus Ellis (England) Lauren Smith	16–21, 21–19, 21–4	(gold) Winner
2019	Polish Open	(England) Jessica Pugh	(France) Thom Gicquel (France) Delphine Delrue	21–17, 21–15	(gold) Winner
2019	Spanish International	(England) Jessica Pugh	(Denmark) Mathias Bay-Smidt (Denmark) Rikke Søby Hansen	21–13, 24–26, 21–18	(gold) Winner
2019	Belgian International	(England) Jessica Pugh	(Denmark) Mikkel Mikkelsen (Denmark) Amalie Magelund	21–12, 21–15	(gold) Winner

BWF International Challenge tournament
BWF International Series tournament
BWF Future Series tournament
