= Toma Junior Popov =

French badminton player (born 1998)

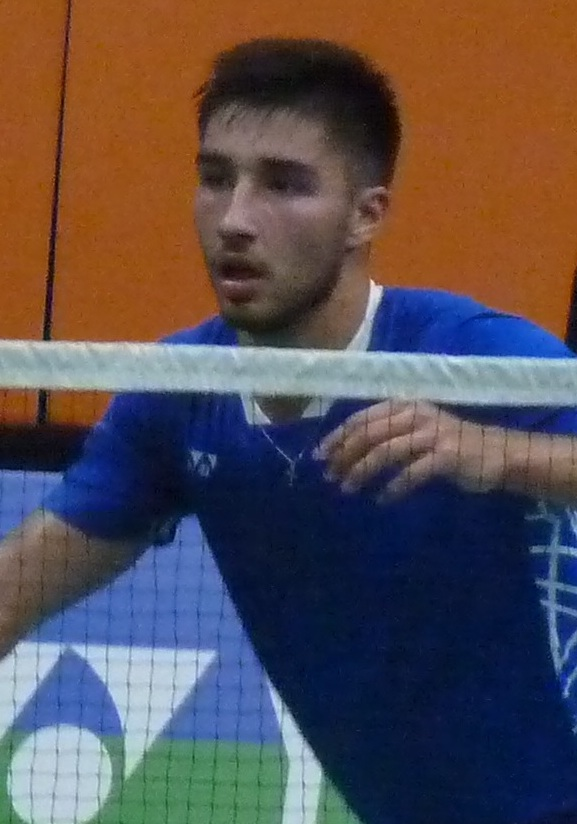
- Popov at the 2018 Dutch Open

Personal information
- Born: 29 September 1998 (age 28) Sofia, Bulgaria
- Height: 1.96 m (6 ft 5 in)
- Weight: 86 kg (190 lb)

Sport
- Country: France
- Sport: Badminton
- Handedness: Right

Men's singles & doubles
- Highest ranking: 12 (MS, 3 November 2026); 16 (MD with Christo Popov, 29 July 2025)
- Current ranking: 13 (MS); 25 (MD with Christo Popov) (17 November 2026)
- BWF profile
Medal record
Men's badminton
Representing France
Thomas Cup
Silver medal – second place	2026 Horsens	Men's team
European Games
Bronze medal – third place	2023 Kraków–Małopolska	Men's singles
Bronze medal – third place	2023 Kraków–Małopolska	Men's doubles
European Championships
Gold medal – first place	2025 Horsens	Men's doubles
Silver medal – second place	2024 Saarbrücken	Men's singles
Silver medal – second place	2025 Horsens	Men's singles
Silver medal – second place	2026 Huelva	Men's doubles
Bronze medal – third place	2022 Madrid	Men's singles
Bronze medal – third place	2026 Huelva	Men's singles
European Mixed Team Championships
Silver medal – second place	2021 Vantaa	Mixed team
Silver medal – second place	2023 Aire-sur-la-Lys	Mixed team
Silver medal – second place	2025 Baku	Mixed team
European Men's Team Championships
Gold medal – first place	2026 Istanbul	Men's team
Silver medal – second place	2016 Kazan	Men's team
Silver medal – second place	2024 Łódź	Men's team
Bronze medal – third place	2018 Kazan	Men's team
Bronze medal – third place	2020 Liévin	Men's team
Mediterranean Games
Bronze medal – third place	2018 Tarragona	Men's singles
European Junior Championships
Gold medal – first place	2017 Mulhouse	Boys' singles
Gold medal – first place	2017 Mulhouse	Boys' doubles
Gold medal – first place	2017 Mulhouse	Mixed team
Bronze medal – third place	2015 Lubin	Boys' singles
Bronze medal – third place	2015 Lubin	Mixed team

Toma Junior Popov (born 29 September 1998) is a French badminton player. Partnered with his brother Christo Popov, he won the men's doubles gold at the 2025 European Championships. He competed at the 2018 Mediterranean Games and claimed the men's singles bronze medal. The Popov brothers also competed for France at the 2024 Summer Olympics in the men's doubles event.

In the juniors, Popov won the bronze medal at the 2015 European Junior Championships in the boys' singles event. Popov made history as the first non-Danish male player to win a European Junior team gold as well as the men's singles and doubles in 2017. He joined Peter Gade, Jim Laugesen, and Thomas Stuer-Lauridsen as the only men to have ever completed the treble.

== Early and personal life ==
Born in Sofia, Popov came from a badminton family. His father, Thomas, is a former Bulgarian and French national player. His brother, Christo Popov, also plays badminton. He started to play when he was 8 with neighbour and won his school championship at age of 9. Both of them trained at the Fos-sur-Mer club.

== Career ==
In 2026, Popov and the French team captured the gold medal by breaking Denmark's long-standing dominance in the European Men's Team Championships. He then became a finalist in the Orléans Masters defeating by Alex Lanier in the final. Popov also made history with the French team, which reached the final of the Thomas Cup for the first time, and won the silver medal after being defeated by China.

== Achievements ==
=== European Games ===
Men's singles
Year	Venue	Opponent	Score	Result
2023	Arena Jaskółka; Tarnów, Poland	(Denmark) Viktor Axelsen	17–21, 18–21	Bronze

Men's doubles
Year	Venue	Partner	Opponent	Score	Result
2023	Arena Jaskółka; Tarnów, Poland	(France) Christo Popov	(United Kingdom) Ben Lane (United Kingdom) Sean Vendy	15–21, 14–21	Bronze

=== European Championships ===
Men's singles
Year	Venue	Opponent	Score	Result	Ref.
2022	Polideportivo Municipal Gallur; Madrid, Spain	(Denmark) Anders Antonsen	16–21, 21–19, 15–21	Bronze	
2024	Saarlandhalle; Saarbrücken, Germany	(Denmark) Anders Antonsen	18–21, 13–21	Silver	
2025	Forum; Horsens, Denmark	(France) Alex Lanier	17–21, 18–21	Silver	
2026	Palacio de los Deportes Carolina Marín; Huelva, Spain	(France) Christo Popov	18–21, 25–27	Bronze	

Men's doubles
Year	Venue	Partner	Opponent	Score	Result	Ref.
2025	Forum; Horsens, Denmark	(France) Christo Popov	(France) Éloi Adam (France) Léo Rossi	21–12, 18–21, 21–18	Gold	
2026	Palacio de los Deportes Carolina Marín; Huelva, Spain	(France) Christo Popov	(England) Ben Lane (England) Sean Vendy	15–21, 16–21	Silver	

=== Mediterranean Games ===
Men's singles
Year	Venue	Opponent	Score	Result	Ref.
2018	El Morell Pavilion; Tarragona, Spain	(Turkey) Muhammed Ali Kurt	21–17, 21–16	Bronze	

=== European Junior Championships ===
Boys' singles
Year	Venue	Opponent	Score	Result	Ref.
2015	Regional Sport Centrum Hall; Lubin, Poland	(Denmark) Anders Antonsen	13–21, 9–21	Bronze	
2017	Centre Sportif Régional d'Alsace; Mulhouse, France	(France) Arnaud Merklé	21–14, 21–15	Gold	

Boys' doubles
Year	Venue	Partner	Opponent	Score	Result	Ref.
2017	Centre Sportif Régional d'Alsace; Mulhouse, France	(France) Thom Gicquel	(England) Max Flynn (England) Callum Hemming	21–17, 21–13	Gold	

=== BWF World Tour (4 titles, 6 runners-up) ===
The BWF World Tour, which was announced on 19 March 2017 and implemented in 2018, is a series of elite badminton tournaments sanctioned by the Badminton World Federation (BWF). The BWF World Tour is divided into levels of World Tour Finals, Super 1000, Super 750, Super 500, Super 300 (part of the BWF World Tour), and the BWF Tour Super 100.

Men's singles
Year	Tournament	Level	Opponent	Score	Result	Ref.
2020	SaarLorLux Open	Super 100	(Netherlands) Mark Caljouw	22–20, 19–21, 21–14	(gold) Winner	
2021	Orléans Masters	Super 100	(Denmark) Mads Christophersen	23–21, 21–13	(gold) Winner	
2021	Spain Masters	Super 300	(Indonesia) Chico Aura Dwi Wardoyo	21–15, 21–17	(gold) Winner	
2022	Orléans Masters	Super 100	(India) Mithun Manjunath	21–11, 21–19	(gold) Winner	
2024	Spain Masters	Super 300	(Singapore) Loh Kean Yew	11–21, 21–15, 20–22	(silver) Runner-up	
2024	Hylo Open	Super 300	(France) Christo Popov	13–21, 10–21	(silver) Runner-up	
2026	German Open	Super 300	(France) Christo Popov	16–21, 15–21	(silver) Runner-up	
2026	Orléans Masters	Super 300	(France) Alex Lanier	11–21, 13–21	(silver) Runner-up	
2026	China Open	Super 1000	(Chinese Taipei) Chou Tien-chen	15–21, 21–7, 13–21	(silver) Runner-up	

Men's doubles
Year	Tournament	Level	Partner	Opponent	Score	Result
2025	German Open	Super 300	(France) Christo Popov	(South Korea) Kim Won-ho (South Korea) Seo Seung-jae	19–21, 17–21	(silver) Runner-up

=== BWF International Challenge/Series (10 titles, 1 runner-up) ===
Men's singles
Year	Tournament	Opponent	Score	Result
2016	Latvia International	(Finland) Kasper Lehikoinen	21–14, 21–14	(gold) Winner
2018	Hellas International	(Czech Republic) Ondřej Král	21–7, 21–13	(gold) Winner
2018	Latvia International	(France) Léo Rossi	21–10, 21–15	(gold) Winner
2018	Spanish International	(France) Lucas Corvée	21–13, 21–17	(gold) Winner
2018	Bulgarian Open	(France) Arnaud Merklé	22–20, 21–12	(gold) Winner
2018	Czech Open	(Denmark) Victor Svendsen	21–16, 21–11	(gold) Winner
2019	Bulgarian Open	(New Zealand) Abhinav Manota	21–15, 21–10	(gold) Winner
2019	Irish Open	(Spain) Pablo Abián	21–10, 24–22	(gold) Winner

Men's doubles
Year	Tournament	Partner	Opponent	Score	Result
2014	Bulgarian Eurasia Open	(France) Thomas Vallez	(France) Ronan Guéguin (France) Alexandre Hammer	11–10, 11–10, 11–9	(gold) Winner
2018	Bulgarian Open	(France) Christo Popov	(Chinese Taipei) Chen Yu-jun (Chinese Taipei) Lin Bing-wei	17–21, 21–7, 21–17	(gold) Winner
2019	Italian International	(France) Christo Popov	(Germany) Bjarne Geiss (Germany) Jan Colin Völker	18–21, 16–21	(silver) Runner-up

=== BWF Junior International (9 titles, 4 runners-up) ===
Boys' singles
Year	Tournament	Opponent	Score	Result
2014	Bulgarian Junior International	(France) Alexandre Hammer	11–10, 4–11, 4–11, 11–6, 11–4	(gold) Winner
2015	Bulgarian Junior International	(Bulgaria) Daniel Nikolov	21–9, 19–21, 13–21	(silver) Runner-up
2015	Slovenia Junior International	(Austria) Wolfgang Gnedt	21–14, 10–21, 23–21	(gold) Winner
2016	Hellas Junior International	(Republic of Ireland) Nhat Nguyen	21–17, 11–21, 21–14	(gold) Winner
2016	Belgian Junior International	(France) Arnaud Merklé	21–15, 21–12	(gold) Winner
2016	Danish Junior Cup	(Republic of Ireland) Nhat Nguyen	21–16, 19–21, 24–22	(gold) Winner

Boys' doubles
Year	Tournament	Partner	Opponent	Score	Result
2014	Bulgarian Junior International	(France) Thomas Vallez	(France) Ronan Gueguin (France) Alexandre Hammer	10–11, 11–10, 9–11, 11–6, 6–11	(silver) Runner-up
2015	Hungarian Junior International	(France) Thomas Vallez	(Poland) Aleksander Jabłoński (Poland) Paweł Śmiłowski	21–17, 20–22, 21–19	(gold) Winner
2015	Slovenia Junior International	(France) Gregor Dunikowski	(Turkey) Emre Cömert (Turkey) Baran Yüksel	21–16, 21–17	(gold) Winner
2016	Hellas Junior International	(France) Thomas Baures	(France) Éloi Adam (France) Samy Corvée	21–18, 21–15	(gold) Winner
2016	Bulgarian Junior International	(France) Léo Rossi	(Thailand) Pakin Kuna-anuvit (Thailand) Natthapat Trinkajee	13–21, 8–21	(silver) Runner-up
2016	Belgian Junior International	(France) Léo Rossi	(England) Zach Russ (England) Steven Stallwood	21–11, 21–15	(gold) Winner
2016	Danish Junior Cup	(Denmark) Karl Thor Søndergaard	(Denmark) Rasmus Kjær (Denmark) Jesper Toft	14–21, 21–17, 17–21	(silver) Runner-up

BWF Junior International Grand Prix tournament
BWF Junior International Challenge tournament
BWF Junior International Series tournament
BWF Junior Future Series tournament
