= 2015 Dutch Open Grand Prix =

Tournament details
- Dates: 6 October 2015 – 11 October 2015
- Level: Grand Prix
- Total prize money: US$50,000
- Venue: Topsportcentrum
- Location: Almere, Netherlands

Champions
- Men's singles: (India) Ajay Jayaram
- Women's singles: (Scotland) Kirsty Gilmour
- Men's doubles: (Malaysia) Koo Kien Keat (Malaysia) Tan Boon Heong
- Women's doubles: (Bulgaria) Gabriela Stoeva (Bulgaria) Stefani Stoeva
- Mixed doubles: (France) Ronan Labar (France) Emilie Lefel

The 2015 Dutch Open Grand Prix was the third grand prix and grand prix gold tournament of the 2015 BWF Grand Prix and Grand Prix Gold. The tournament will be held in Topsportcentrum, Almere, Netherlands October 6–11, 2015 and had a total purse of $50,000.

== Men's singles ==
=== Seeds ===
1. (Germany) Marc Zwiebler (withdrew)
2. (England) Rajiv Ouseph (withdrew)
3. (India) Ajay Jayaram (champion)
4. (India) B. Sai Praneeth (second round)
5. (Republic of Ireland) Scott Evans (withdrew)
6. (Malaysia) Zulfadli Zulkiffli (second round)
7. (Indonesia) Andre Kurniawan Tedjono (first round)
8. (Israel) Misha Zilberman (first round)
9. (India) R. M. V. Gurusaidutt (quarter-final)
10. (Spain) Pablo Abian (second round)
11. (Russia) Vladimir Malkov (withdrew)
12. (Estonia) Raul Must (final)
13. (France) Thomas Rouxel (second round)
14. (India) Anand Pawar (first round)
15. (Denmark) Emil Holst (semi-final)
16. (Denmark) Joachim Persson (quarter-final)

=== Finals ===
Quarterfinals
(Malaysia) Soo Teck Zhi	5	12
15	(Denmark) Emil Holst	21	21
12	(Estonia) Raul Must	19	21	21
9	(India) R. M. V. Gurusaidutt	21	14	18
(Malaysia) Iskandar Zulkarnain Zainuddin	19	21	14
3	(India) Ajay Jayaram	21	18	21
16	(Denmark) Joachim Persson	12	22	20
(Malaysia) Goh Soon Huat	21	20	22

Semifinals
15	(Denmark) Emil Holst	18	21	11
12	(Estonia) Raul Must	21	17	21
3	(India) Ajay Jayaram	21	21
(Malaysia) Goh Soon Huat	14	15

Final
12	(Estonia) Raul Must	12	18
3	(India) Ajay Jayaram	21	21

=== Top half ===
==== Section 1 ====
First Round
PFQ	(Germany) P Kaemnitz	11	16
(Sweden) M Borg	21	21
(Netherlands) J Hilbink	19	20
(Bulgaria) B Kisyov	21	22
10	(Spain) P Abián	21	21
Q4	(Germany) D Benz	8	18
(France) L Corvee	18	16
(Malaysia) Soo T Z	21	21

Second Round
(Sweden) M Borg	21	21
(Bulgaria) B Kisyov	9	16
10	(Spain) P Abián	15	21	14
(Malaysia) Soo T Z	21	17	21

Third Round
(Sweden) M Borg	10	14
(Malaysia) Soo T Z	21	21

==== Section 2 ====
First Round
7	(Indonesia) A K Tedjono	17	10
(Czech Republic) P Koukal	21	21
(Germany) D Domke	21	21
(Ukraine) V Atrashchenkov	14	9
15	(Denmark) E Holst	21	21
Q7	(Indonesia) S A S Putra	16	18
(Indonesia) A Marteen	18	21	21
(Finland) A Kaisti	21	19	13

Second Round
(Czech Republic) P Koukal	11	15
(Germany) D Domke	21	21
15	(Denmark) E Holst	22	21
(Indonesia) A Marteen	20	13

Third Round
(Germany) D Domke	17	11
15	(Denmark) E Holst	21	21

==== Section 3 ====
First Round
4	(India) S Praneeth	21	21
(Denmark) S Rasmussen	15	11
(Denmark) R Fladberg	17	21	21
(Croatia) Z Durkinjak	21	16	6
12	(Estonia) R Must	27	21
(Denmark) F Quach	25	19
(Finland) E Heino	11	15
(Netherlands) N Fransman	21	21

Second Round
4	(India) S Praneeth	15	21	12
(Denmark) R Fladberg	21	7	21
12	(Estonia) R Must	21	21
(Netherlands) N Fransman	12	18

Third Round
(Denmark) R Fladberg	19	11
12	(Estonia) R Must	21	21

==== Section 4 ====
First Round
PFQ	(Netherlands) V De Vries	21	17	21
Q2	(Belgium) B Abts	14	21	16
(Finland) K Koljonen	21	12	18
(Ukraine) D Zavadsky	9	21	21
9	(India) R. M. V. Gurusaidutt	21	21
(Belgium) M Moreels	8	9
Q3	(Chinese Taipei) Chen C-w	21	20
PFQ	(Malaysia) Zh Zulkiffli	12	19^{r}

Second Round
PFQ	(Netherlands) V De Vries	10	20
(Ukraine) D Zavadsky	21	22
9	(India) R. M. V. Gurusaidutt	21	21
Q3	(Chinese Taipei) Chen C-w	14	19

Third Round
(Ukraine) D Zavadsky	12	11
9	(India) R. M. V. Gurusaidutt	21	21

=== Bottom half ===
==== Section 5 ====
First Round
Q8	(Germany) S Hsiao	15	13
(England) R Walker	21	21
(Malaysia) I Zainuddin	21	21
14	(India) A Pawar	10	15
(Finland) V Lang	21	21
(Slovenia) I Utrosa	11	14
(France) L Claerbout	11	10
6	(Malaysia) Zf Zulkiffli	21	21

Second Round
(England) R Walker	14	11
(Malaysia) I Zainuddin	21	21
(Finland) V Lang	22	21	21
6	(Malaysia) Zf Zulkiffli	20	23	15

Third Round
(Malaysia) I Zainuddin	22	21
(Finland) V Lang	20	12

==== Section 6 ====
First Round
(Netherlands) E Meijs	20	16
(Finland) K Lehikoinen	21	21
Q1	(Netherlands) A Vlaar	9	15
PFQ	(Germany) L Schaenzler	21	21
(Ukraine) A Pochtarev	21	21	19
(Germany) F Roth	12	23	21
(Netherlands) M Caljouw	21	17	18
3	(India) A Jayaram	19	21	21

Second Round
(Finland) K Lehikoinen
PFQ	(Germany) L Schaenzler	w/o
(Germany) F Roth	14	10
3	(India) A Jayaram	21	21

Third Round
(Finland) K Lehikoinen	14	13
3	(India) A Jayaram	21	21

==== Section 7 ====
First Round
(Denmark) C L Thomsen	21	21
(Belgium) Y Tan	19	18
PFQ	(Sweden) J Nilsson	16	19
16	(Denmark) J Persson	21	21
Q5	(Germany) A Trisnanto	21	21
Q6	(Netherlands) J Natenstedt	18	16
(Portugal) P Martins	23	21
8	(Israel) M Zilberman	21	11

Second Round
(Denmark) C L Thomsen	21	20	19
16	(Denmark) J Persson	13	22	21
Q5	(Germany) A Trisnanto	17	14
(Portugal) P Martins	21	21

Third Round
16	(Denmark) J Persson	15	21	21
(Portugal) P Martins	21	18	16

==== Section 8 ====
First Round
PFQ	(Malaysia) Chiang J S	9	15
(Lithuania) K Navickas	21	21
PFQ	(Germany) T Wadenka	16	15
13	(France) T Rouxel	21	21
(Malaysia) Goh S H	21	21
(Indonesia) A Pratama	16	13
(Sweden) H Hurskainen	19	13
PFQ	(Germany) K Schaefer	21	21

Second Round
(Lithuania) K Navickas	19	22	21
13	(France) T Rouxel	21	20	12
(Malaysia) Goh S H	21	21
PFQ	(Germany) K Schaefer	11	14

Third Round
(Lithuania) K Navickas	13	17
(Malaysia) Goh S H	21	21

== Women's singles ==
=== Seeds ===
1. (United States) Zhang Beiwen (withdrew)
2. (Spain) Beatriz Corrales (withdrew)
3. (Germany) Karin Schnaase (final)
4. (United States) Iris Wang (quarter-final)
5. (Scotland) Kirsty Gilmour (champion)
6. (Chinese Taipei) Hsu Ya-ching (semi-final)
7. (United States) Rong Schafer (second round)
8. (Bulgaria) Linda Zetchiri (quarter-final)

=== Finals ===
Semifinals
(Denmark) Line Kjaersfeldt	10	20
3	(Germany) Karin Schnaase	21	22
5	(Scotland) Kirsty Gilmour	21	17	21
6	(Chinese Taipei) Hsu Ya-ching	17	21	12

Final
3	(Germany) Karin Schnaase	16	13
5	(Scotland) Kirsty Gilmour	21	21

=== Top half ===
==== Section 1 ====
First Round
PFQ	(Denmark) N K Rohde	17	18
(Republic of Ireland) C Magee	21	21
(India) P. C. Thulasi	20	21	21
Q1	(Netherlands) G Mahulette	22	15	16
7	(United States) R Schafer	21	21
(Turkey) O Bayrak	18	13
(Denmark) L Kjaersfeldt	2
(Russia) N Perminova	0^{r}

Second Round
(Republic of Ireland) C Magee	21	21	21
(India) P. C. Thulasi	19	23	19
7	(United States) R Schafer	21	14
(Denmark) L Kjaersfeldt	23	21

Quarterfinals
(Republic of Ireland) C Magee	22	17	20
(Denmark) L Kjaersfeldt	20	21	22

==== Section 2 ====
First Round
3	(Germany) K Schnaase	21	21
(Denmark) M Poulsen	9	13
(Netherlands) S Eijbergen	21	21
(Switzerland) S Jaquet	14	15
8	(Bulgaria) L Zetchiri	21	21
(Nigeria) G Gabriel	10	9
(Indonesia) A Firdasari	21	22
PFQ	(Lithuania) A Stapušaitytė	17	20

Second Round
3	(Germany) K Schnaase	21	21
(Netherlands) S Eijbergen	13	13
8	(Bulgaria) L Zetchiri	21	21
(Indonesia) A Firdasari	17	10

Quarterfinals
3	(Germany) K Schnaase	25	21
8	(Bulgaria) L Zetchiri	23	17

=== Bottom half ===
==== Section 3 ====
First Round
(Turkey) N Yiğit	18	19
(Belgium) L Tan	21	21
(Germany) F Deprez	9	21	10
5	(Scotland) K Gilmour	21	19	21
(Finland) N Vainio	21	21
Q3	(Ukraine) N Voytsekh	8	14
(Indonesia) R Hartawan	9	8
4	(United States) I Wang	21	21

Second Round
(Belgium) L Tan	18	17
5	(Scotland) K Gilmour	21	21
(Finland) N Vainio	18	14
4	(United States) I Wang	21	21

Quarterfinals
5	(Scotland) K Gilmour	21	21
4	(United States) I Wang	14	15

==== Section 4 ====
First Round
(Russia) K Polikarpova	16	21	20
(Ukraine) M Ulitina	21	12	22
Q4	(England) N Cerfontyne	16	11
6	(Chinese Taipei) Hsu Y-c	21	21
Q2	(Germany) O Konon	19	21	19
(Thailand) N Jindapol	21	19	21
(Denmark) A T Madsen	21	21
PFQ	(Finland) A Mikkela	16	10

Second Round
(Ukraine) M Ulitina	21	18	16
6	(Chinese Taipei) Hsu Y-c	14	21	21
(Thailand) N Jindapol	21	21
(Denmark) A T Madsen	19	19

Quarterfinals
6	(Chinese Taipei) Hsu Y-c	16	21	21
(Thailand) N Jindapol	21	13	16

== Men's doubles ==
=== Seeds ===
1. (England) Marcus Ellis / Chris Langridge (withdrew)
2. (India) Manu Attri / B. Sumeeth Reddy (final)
3. (Poland) Adam Cwalina / Przemyslaw Wacha (second round)
4. (Germany) Michael Fuchs / Johannes Schoettler (quarter-final)
5. (Germany) Max Schwenger / Josche Zurwonne (quarter-final)
6. (France) Baptiste Careme / Ronan Labar (first round)
7. (Malaysia) Koo Kien Keat / Tan Boon Heong (champion)
8. (India) Pranaav Jerry Chopra / Akshay Dewalkar (first round)

=== Finals ===
Semifinals
7	(Malaysia) Koo Kien Keat (Malaysia) Tan Boon Heong	21	19	21
(Chinese Taipei) Lee Jhe-huei (Chinese Taipei) Lee Yang	19	21	16
(England) Andrew Ellis (England) Peter Mills	20	21	14
2	(India) Manu Attri (India) B. Sumeeth Reddy	22	19	21

Final
7	(Malaysia) Koo Kien Keat (Malaysia) Tan Boon Heong	21	21
2	(India) Manu Attri (India) B. Sumeeth Reddy	15	10

=== Top half ===
==== Section 1 ====
First Round
PFQ	(Indonesia) S A S Putra (Germany) A Trisnanto	10	9
(Thailand) B Issara (Thailand) N Puangpuapech	21	21
(England) R Golding (England) V Liew	14	11
PFQ	(Scotland) R Blair (Scotland) A Hall	21	21
7	(Malaysia) Koo K K (Malaysia) Tan B H	21	21
(Greece) G Galvas (Greece) P Skarlatos	7	8
(France) B Kersaudy (France) G Mittelheisser	21	16	22
(Republic of Ireland) J Magee (Republic of Ireland) S Magee	16	21	20

Second Round
(Thailand) B Issara (Thailand) N Puangpuapech	21	21
PFQ	(Scotland) R Blair (Scotland) A Hall	14	15
7	(Malaysia) Koo K K (Malaysia) Tan B H	23	15	21
(France) B Kersaudy (France) G Mittelheisser	21	21	11

Quarterfinals
(Thailand) B Issara (Thailand) N Puangpuapech	21	15	14
7	(Malaysia) Koo K K (Malaysia) Tan B H	18	21	21

==== Section 2 ====
First Round
4	(Germany) M Fuchs (Germany) J Schoettler
Q2	BYE
(England) P Briggs (England) T Wolfenden	21	24
Q4	(France) J Corvee (France) J Maio	13	22
8	(India) P J Chopra (India) A Dewalkar	14	18
(Scotland) M Campbell (Scotland) P Machugh	21	21
(Denmark) M Christiansen (Denmark) D Daugaard	14	19
(Chinese Taipei) Lee J-h (Chinese Taipei) Lee Y	21	21

Second Round
4	(Germany) M Fuchs (Germany) J Schoettler	21	21
(England) P Briggs (England) T Wolfenden	17	13
(Scotland) M Campbell (Scotland) P Machugh	11	21	9
(Chinese Taipei) Lee J-h (Chinese Taipei) Lee Y	21	18	21

Quarterfinals
4	(Germany) M Fuchs (Germany) J Schoettler	17	14
(Chinese Taipei) Lee J-h (Chinese Taipei) Lee Y	21	21

=== Bottom half ===
==== Section 3 ====
First Round
(Malaysia) Lee J Y (Malaysia) Lim Z T	21	19	21
(Ukraine) G Natarov (Ukraine) A Pochtarev	16	21	9
(England) A Ellis (England) P Mills	21	21
6	(France) B Careme (France) R Labar	11	15
(Belgium) M Dierickx (Belgium) F Golinski	10	15
(Chinese Taipei) Lin C-y (Chinese Taipei) Wu H-l	21	21
(Germany) R Beck (Germany) P Kaesbauer	28	17	13
3	(Poland) A Cwalina (Poland) P Wacha	26	21	21

Second Round
(Malaysia) Lee J Y (Malaysia) Lim Z T	18	13
(England) A Ellis (England) P Mills	21	21
(Chinese Taipei) Lin C-y (Chinese Taipei) Wu H-l	21	18	21
3	(Poland) A Cwalina (Poland) P Wacha	11	21	9

Quarterfinals
(England) A Ellis (England) P Mills	21	13	21
(Chinese Taipei) Lin C-y (Chinese Taipei) Wu H-l	17	21	17

==== Section 4 ====
First Round
(Germany) D Benz (Malaysia) Chiang J S	14	18
(Canada) A Liu (Canada) D Ng	21	21
Q1	(Czech Republic) O Kral (Czech Republic) I Stoklas	12	14
5	(Germany) M Schwenger (Germany) J Zurwonne	21	21
(Netherlands) M Caljouw (Netherlands) J Maas	21	21
(Germany) F Holzer (Germany) J Pistorius	19	14
Q3	(Netherlands) R Jille (Netherlands) R Tabeling	w	/	o
2	(India) M Attri (India) B. S Reddy

Second Round
(Canada) A Liu (Canada) D Ng	18	21	16
5	(Germany) M Schwenger (Germany) J Zurwonne	21	15	21
(Netherlands) M Caljouw (Netherlands) J Maas	13	21	18
2	(India) M Attri (India) B. S Reddy	21	19	21

Quarterfinals
5	(Germany) M Schwenger (Germany) J Zurwonne	21	13	19
2	(India) M Attri (India) B. S Reddy	18	21	21

== Women's doubles ==
=== Seeds ===
1. (Netherlands) Eefje Muskens / Selena Piek (final)
2. (Bulgaria) Gabriela Stoeva / Stefani Stoeva (champion)
3. (Germany) Johanna Goliszewski / Carla Nelte (semi-final)
4. (England) Heather Olver / Lauren Smith (quarter-final)

=== Finals ===
Semifinals
1	(Netherlands) Eefje Muskens (Netherlands) Selena Piek	21	21
3	(Germany) Johanna Goliszewski (Germany) Carla Nelte	16	9
(Indonesia) Pia Zebadiah Bernadeth (Indonesia) Aprilsasi Putri Lejarsar Variella	23	21	21
2	(Bulgaria) Gabriela Stoeva (Bulgaria) Stefani Stoeva	25	17	23

Final
1	(Netherlands) Eefje Muskens (Netherlands) Selena Piek	22	15
2	(Bulgaria) Gabriela Stoeva (Bulgaria) Stefani Stoeva	24	21

=== Top half ===
==== Section 1 ====
First Round
1	(Netherlands) E Muskens (Netherlands) S Piek
BYE
(Ukraine) N Voytsekh (Ukraine) Y Zharka	16	21	21
(Germany) L Kaminski (Germany) H Pohl	21	11	13
(Norway) C Leinan (Norway) M Wåland
BYE
(England) S Brown (England) K Robertshaw	21	21
(Germany) B Bellenberg (Germany) E Janssens	15	10

Second Round
1	(Netherlands) E Muskens (Netherlands) S Piek	21	21
(Ukraine) N Voytsekh (Ukraine) Y Zharka	6	10
(Norway) C Leinan (Norway) M Wåland	8	5
(England) S Brown (England) K Robertshaw	21	21

Quarterfinals
1	(Netherlands) E Muskens (Netherlands) S Piek	21	21
(England) S Brown (England) K Robertshaw	11	12

==== Section 2 ====
First Round
3	(Germany) J Goliszewski (Germany) C Nelte
BYE
(Turkey) O Bayrak (Turkey) N Yigit	21	25
(France) M Batomene (France) E Lefel	12	23
(Australia) L Choo (Switzerland) N Fankhauser
BYE
(Denmark) M Fruergaard (Denmark) L Grebak	w	/	o
(Germany) J Karnott (Germany) F Volkmann

Second Round
3	(Germany) J Goliszewski (Germany) C Nelte	23	13	21
(Turkey) O Bayrak (Turkey) N Yigit	21	21	15
(Australia) L Choo (Switzerland) N Fankhauser
(Germany) J Karnott (Germany) F Volkmann	w	/	o

Quarterfinals
3	(Germany) J Goliszewski (Germany) C Nelte	21	21
(Australia) L Choo (Switzerland) N Fankhauser	13	15

=== Bottom half ===
==== Section 3 ====
First Round
(Netherlands) A Chen (Netherlands) C Seinen
(India) P Gadre (India) S Reddy	w	/	o
BYE
(Indonesia) P Z Bernadeth (Indonesia) A P L Variella
(Chinese Taipei) Hsieh P-c (Chinese Taipei) Wu T-j	19	19
(Germany) I Herttrich (Germany) B Michels	21	21
BYE
4	(England) H Olver (England) L Smith

Second Round
(Netherlands) A Chen (Netherlands) C Seinen	17	14
(Indonesia) P Z Bernadeth (Indonesia) A P L Variella	21	21
(Germany) I Herttrich (Germany) B Michels	29	21	17
4	(England) H Olver (England) L Smith	30	14	21

Quarterfinals
(Indonesia) P Z Bernadeth (Indonesia) A P L Variella	21	21
4	(England) H Olver (England) L Smith	18	7

==== Section 4 ====
First Round
(Hungary) D Gonda (Germany) A Horbach	12	15
(Germany) L Efler (Germany) L Kaepplein	21	21
BYE
(France) A Fontaine (France) A Tran
(Netherlands) S Barning (Netherlands) I Tabeling	21	21
(Canada) A Bruce (Canada) P Chan	14	18
BYE
2	(Bulgaria) G Stoeva (Bulgaria) S Stoeva

Second Round
(Germany) L Efler (Germany) L Kaepplein	21	17	21
(France) A Fontaine (France) A Tran	12	21	18
(Netherlands) S Barning (Netherlands) I Tabeling	6	21	15
2	(Bulgaria) G Stoeva (Bulgaria) S Stoeva	21	19	21

Quarterfinals
(Germany) L Efler (Germany) L Kaepplein	11	14
2	(Bulgaria) G Stoeva (Bulgaria) S Stoeva	21	21

== Mixed doubles ==
=== Seeds ===
1. (Germany) Michael Fuchs / Birgit Michels (quarter-final)
2. (Netherlands) Jacco Arends / Selena Piek (semi-final)
3. (Singapore) Danny Bawa Chrisnanta / Vanessa Neo Yu Yan (quarter-final)
4. (France) Ronan Labar / Emilie Lefel (champion)
5. (Thailand) Sudket Prapakamol / Saralee Thoungthongkam (final)
6. (Scotland) Robert Blair / (Indonesia) Pia Zebadiah Bernadeth (quarter-final)
7. (Canada) Toby Ng / Alex Bruce (quarter-final)
8. (Russia) Vitalij Durkin / Nina Vislova (first round)

=== Finals ===
Semifinals
(Poland) Robert Mateusiak (Poland) Nadiezda Zieba	22	20	16
4	(France) Ronan Labar (France) Emilie Lefel	20	22	21
5	(Thailand) Sudket Prapakamol (Thailand) Saralee Thoungthongkam	30	21
2	(Netherlands) Jacco Arends (Netherlands) Selena Piek	29	18

Final
4	(France) Ronan Labar (France) Emilie Lefel	21	21
5	(Thailand) Sudket Prapakamol (Thailand) Saralee Thoungthongkam	10	18

=== Top half ===
==== Section 1 ====
First Round
1	(Germany) M Fuchs (Germany) B Michels	21	16	21
(Republic of Ireland) S Magee (Republic of Ireland) C Magee	14	21	14
(Netherlands) R Tabeling (Netherlands) S Barning	1^{r}
(Germany) P Kaesbauer (Germany) F Volkmann	1
8	(Russia) V Durkin (Russia) N Vislova	15	16
(Poland) R Mateusiak (Poland) N Zieba	21	21
PFQ	(Chinese Taipei) Wu H-l (Chinese Taipei) Hsieh P-c	14	21	17
(Thailand) B Issara (Thailand) S Amitrapai	21	18	21

Second Round
1	(Germany) M Fuchs (Germany) B Michels	21	21
(Germany) P Kaesbauer (Germany) F Volkmann	6	18
(Poland) R Mateusiak (Poland) N Zieba	21	21
(Thailand) B Issara (Thailand) S Amitrapai	10	18

Quarterfinals
1	(Germany) M Fuchs (Germany) B Michels	20	17
(Poland) R Mateusiak (Poland) N Zieba	22	21

==== Section 2 ====
First Round
4	(France) R Labar (France) E Lefel	21	17	21
(Finland) A Kaisti (Netherlands) C Seinen	16	21	9
PFQ	(Germany) T Wadenka (Germany) B Bellenberg	14	12
(Sweden) N Ruponen (Sweden) A Hogstrom	21	21
6	(Scotland) R Blair (Indonesia) P Z Bernadeth	21	17	21
(France) B Kersaudy (France) L Palermo	17	21	16
(Germany) J Pistorius (Germany) E Janssens	9	18
Q2	(Netherlands) R Jille (Netherlands) I Tabeling	21	21

Second Round
4	(France) R Labar (France) E Lefel	21	21
(Sweden) N Ruponen (Sweden) A Hogstrom	13	11
6	(Scotland) R Blair (Indonesia) P Z Bernadeth	22	21
Q2	(Netherlands) R Jille (Netherlands) I Tabeling	20	17

Quarterfinals
4	(France) R Labar (France) E Lefel	21	23
6	(Scotland) R Blair (Indonesia) P Z Bernadeth	12	21

=== Bottom half ===
==== Section 3 ====
First Round
Q3	(Ukraine) G Natarov (Ukraine) N Voytsekh	14	12
(Australia) R Middleton (Australia) L Choo	21	21
(Germany) M E Seidel (Germany) L Efler	w	/	o
5	(Thailand) S Prapakamol (Thailand) S Thoungthongkam
(Germany) R Beck (Germany) J Karnott	8^{r}
(Russia) E Dremin (Russia) E Dimova	11
Q1	(France) J Maio (France) L Baumann	16	19
3	(Singapore) D Chrisnanta (Singapore) V Neo	21	21

Second Round
(Australia) R Middleton (Australia) L Choo	16	13
5	(Thailand) S Prapakamol (Thailand) S Thoungthongkam	21	21
(Russia) E Dremin (Russia) E Dimova	21	16	9
3	(Singapore) D Chrisnanta (Singapore) V Neo	18	21	21

Quarterfinals
5	(Thailand) S Prapakamol (Thailand) S Thoungthongkam	21	17	21
3	(Singapore) D Chrisnanta (Singapore) V Neo	15	21	14

==== Section 4 ====
First Round
(Sweden) J Nordh (Sweden) E Fabbeke	21	21
PFQ	(Germany) R Domke (Germany) K Kattenbeck	16	19
(Chinese Taipei) Lin C-y (Chinese Taipei) Wu T-j	21	14	19
7	(Canada) T Ng (Canada) A Bruce	6	21	21
Q4	(Germany) F M.Gustaf (Indonesia) A P L Variella	17	12
(France) G Mittelheisser (France) A Fontaine	21	21
(India) T Kona (India) S Reddy	16	15
2	(Netherlands) J Arends (Netherlands) S Piek	21	21

Second Round
(Sweden) J Nordh (Sweden) E Fabbeke	12	23
7	(Canada) T Ng (Canada) A Bruce	21	25
(France) G Mittelheisser (France) A Fontaine	13	18
2	(Netherlands) J Arends (Netherlands) S Piek	21	21

Quarterfinals
7	(Canada) T Ng (Canada) A Bruce	21	14	18
2	(Netherlands) J Arends (Netherlands) S Piek	19	21	21

Preceded by 2015 Thailand Open Grand Prix Gold	BWF Grand Prix and Grand Prix Gold; 2015 BWF Season	Succeeded by 2015 Chinese Taipei Masters Grand Prix
