= 2016 in badminton =

== 2016 Summer Olympics (BWF) ==
- August 11–20: 2016 Summer Olympics in (Brazil) Rio de Janeiro at the Riocentro
  - Men's Singles: (gold) (China) Chen Long; (silver) (Malaysia) Lee Chong Wei; (bronze) (Denmark) Viktor Axelsen
  - Women's Singles: (gold) (Spain) Carolina Marín; (silver) (India) P. V. Sindhu; (bronze) (Japan) Nozomi Okuhara
  - Men's Doubles:
  - (gold) China (Fu Haifeng & Zhang Nan)
  - (silver) Malaysia (Goh V Shem & Tan Wee Kiong)
  - (bronze) Great Britain (Chris Langridge & Marcus Ellis)
  - Women's Doubles:
  - (gold) Japan (Misaki Matsutomo & Ayaka Takahashi)
  - (silver) Denmark (Christinna Pedersen & Kamilla Rytter Juhl)
  - (bronze) South Korea (Jung Kyung-eun & Shin Seung-chan)
  - Mixed Doubles:
  - (gold) Indonesia (Tontowi Ahmad & Liliyana Natsir)
  - (silver) Malaysia (Chan Peng Soon & Goh Liu Ying)
  - (bronze) China (Zhang Nan & Zhao Yunlei)

== International badminton championships ==
- February 15–21: 2016 Africa Continental Team Championships in Beau-Bassin Rose-Hill
  - Men: South Africa defeated Mauritius, 3–1, in the final. Algeria and Ghana were placed third and fourth respectively.
  - Women: Mauritius defeated Egypt, 3–0, in the final. Ghana and Uganda were placed third and fourth respectively.
- February 15 – 21: 2016 Badminton Asia Team Championships in Hyderabad
  - Men: Indonesia defeated Japan, 3–2, in the final. South Korea and India were placed third and fourth respectively.
  - Women: China defeated Japan, 3–2, in the final. South Korea and Thailand were placed third and fourth respectively.
- February 16 – 18: 2016 Oceania Continental Mixed Team Championships in Auckland, New Zealand
  - Australia defeated New Zealand, 3–2, in the final. French Polynesia and New Caledonia were placed third and fourth respectively.
- February 16 – 21: 2016 European Men's & Women's Team Championships in (Russia) Kazan
  - Men: Denmark defeated France, 3–1, in the final. England and Germany were placed third and fourth respectively.
  - Women: Denmark defeated Bulgaria, 3–1, in the final. Germany and Spain were placed third and fourth respectively.
- February 17 – 20: 2016 Pan Am Team Continental Championships in Guadalajara
  - Men: Mexico defeated Canada, 3–0, in the final.
  - Women: United States defeated Canada, 3–2, in the final.
- February 19 & 20: 2016 Oceania Continental Men's and Women's Team Championships in Auckland
  - Men: New Zealand defeated Australia, 4–1, in the final. French Polynesia and New Caledonia were placed third and fourth respectively.
  - Women: Australia defeated New Zealand, 4–1, in the final. New Caledonia and French Polynesia were placed third and fourth respectively.
- February 19 – 21: 2016 European U15 Championships in (Russia) Kazan
  - Men's Singles: (England) Harry Huang
  - Men's Doubles: (France) Kenji Lovang / Christo Popov
  - Women's Singles: (Denmark) Mathilde Cramer Ahrens
  - Women's Doubles: (Turkey) Bengisu Erçetin / Zehra Erdem
  - Mixed Doubles: (Denmark) Sebastian Grønbjerg / Clara Graversen
- March 17 – 21: 2016 European U17 Team Championships in (Poland) Lubin
  - Denmark defeated England, 3–0 in matches played, in the final. France and Turkey were the third and fourth placed teams.
- March 21 – 25: 2016 European U17 Championships in (Poland) Lubin
  - Men's Singles: (Republic of Ireland) Nhat Nguyen
  - Men's Doubles: (Denmark) Paw Eriksen / Mads Thøgersen
  - Women's Singles: (Denmark) Line Christopher
  - Women's Doubles: (Denmark) Alexandra Bøje / Amalie Mage Krogh
  - Mixed Doubles: (Denmark) Paw Eriksen / Alexandra Bøje
- April 25 – 27: 2016 Pan American Team Badminton Championships in Campinas
  - Canada defeated Brazil, 3–2 in matches played, in the final. Peru took third place.
- April 26 – 28: 2016 Oceania Individual Championships in (French Polynesia) Papeete
  - Men's Singles: (Australia) Ashwant Gobinathan
  - Men's Doubles: (Australia) Matthew Chau / Sawan Serasinghe
  - Women's Singles: (Australia) Chen Hsuan-yu
  - Women's Doubles: (Australia) Tiffany Ho / Jennifer Tam
  - Mixed Doubles: (Australia) Robin Middleton / Leanne Choo
- April 26 – May 1: 2016 European Badminton Championships in (France) La Roche-sur-Yon
  - Men's Singles: (Denmark) Viktor Axelsen
  - Men's Doubles: (Denmark) Mads Conrad-Petersen / Mads Pieler Kolding
  - Women's Singles: (Spain) Carolina Marín
  - Women's Doubles: (Denmark) Christinna Pedersen / Kamilla Rytter Juhl
  - Mixed Doubles: (Denmark) Joachim Fischer Nielsen / Christinna Pedersen
- April 26 – May 1: 2016 Badminton Asia Championships in (China) Wuhan
  - Men's Singles: (Malaysia) Lee Chong Wei
  - Men's Doubles: (South Korea) Lee Yong-dae / Yoo Yeon-seong
  - Women's Singles: (China) Wang Yihan
  - Women's Doubles: (Japan) Misaki Matsutomo / Ayaka Takahashi
  - Mixed Doubles: (China) Zhang Nan / Zhao Yunlei
- April 28 – May 1: 2016 Pan American Individual Championships in (Brazil) Campinas
  - Men's Singles: (Canada) Jason Ho-Shue
  - Men's Doubles: (Canada) Jason Ho-Shue / Nyl Yakura
  - Women's Singles: (Canada) Brittney Tam
  - Women's Doubles: (Canada) Michelle Tong / Josephine Wu
  - Mixed Doubles: (Canada) Nyl Yakura / Brittney Tam
- May 15 – 22: 2016 Thomas & Uber Cup in Kunshan
  - Thomas Cup: Denmark defeated Indonesia, 3–2 in matches played, to win their first Thomas Cup title.
  - Uber Cup: China defeated South Korea, 3–1 in matches played, to win their third consecutive and 14th overall Uber Cup title.
- July 9 – 17: 2016 Badminton Asia Junior Championships in (Thailand) Bangkok
  - Mixed Team: China
  - Boys' Singles: (China) Sun Feixiang
  - Girls' Singles: (China) Chen Yufei
  - Boys' Doubles: (China) Han Chengkai / Zhou Haodong
  - Girls' Doubles: (China) Du Yue / Xu Ya
  - Mixed Doubles: (China) He Jiting / Du Yue
- July 19 – 23: 2016 Pan American U19 Championships in (Peru) Lima
  - Boys' Singles: (Brazil) Cleyson Nob Santos
  - Girls' Singles: (Canada) Qingzi Ouyang
  - Boys' Doubles: (Canada) Desmond Wang / Brian Yang
  - Girls' Doubles: (Canada) Giselle Chan / Katie Ho-Shue
  - Mixed Doubles: (Canada) Brian Yang / Katie Ho-Shue
- September 12 – 18: 2016 World University Badminton Championship in (Russia) Ramenskoye
  - Men's Singles: (Chinese Taipei) WANG Tzu Wei
  - Men's Doubles: (South Korea) Choi Sol-gyu / Kim Jae-hwan
  - Women's Singles: (Japan) Ayaho Sugino
  - Women's Doubles: (China) Du Peng / Huang Dongping
  - Mixed Doubles: (Chinese Taipei) Lee Yang / Hsu Ya-ching
  - Team winners: Chinese Taipei
- November 2 – 6: 2016 World Junior Mixed Team Championships in (Spain) Bilbao
  - 1. China; 2. Malaysia; 3/4: Japan / Thailand
- November 8 – 13: 2016 BWF World Junior Championships in (Spain) Bilbao
  - Boys' Singles: (China) Sun Feixiang
  - Girls' Singles: (China) Chen Yufei
  - Boys' Doubles: (China) Han Chengkai / Zhou Haodong
  - Girls' Doubles: (Japan) Sayaka Hobara / Nami Matsuyama
  - Mixed Doubles: (China) He Jiting / Du Yue

== 2016 BWF Super Series ==
- March 8 – December 18: 2016 BWF Super Series Calendar of Events
  - March 8–13: 2016 All England Super Series Premier in (United Kingdom) Birmingham
    - Men's Singles: (China) Lin Dan
    - Men's Doubles: (Russia) Vladimir Ivanov / Ivan Sozonov
    - Women's Singles: (Japan) Nozomi Okuhara
    - Women's Doubles: (Japan) Misaki Matsutomo / Ayaka Takahashi
    - Mixed Doubles: (Indonesia) Praveen Jordan / Debby Susanto
  - March 29 – April 3: 2016 India Super Series in New Delhi
    - Men's Singles: (Japan) Kento Momota
    - Men's Doubles: (Indonesia) Marcus Fernaldi Gideon / Kevin Sanjaya Sukamuljo
    - Women's Singles: (Thailand) Ratchanok Intanon
    - Women's Doubles: (Japan) Misaki Matsutomo / Ayaka Takahashi
    - Mixed Doubles: (China) Lu Kai / Huang Yaqiong
  - April 5–10: 2016 Malaysia Super Series Premier in Shah Alam
    - Men's Singles: (Malaysia) Lee Chong Wei
    - Men's Doubles: (South Korea) Kim Gi-jung / Kim Sa-rang
    - Women's Singles: (Thailand) Ratchanok Intanon
    - Women's Doubles: (China) Tang Yuanting / Yu Yang
    - Mixed Doubles: (Indonesia) Tontowi Ahmad / Liliyana Natsir
  - April 12–17: 2016 Singapore Super Series in Singapore
    - Men's Singles: (Indonesia) Sony Dwi Kuncoro
    - Men's Doubles: (China) Fu Haifeng / Zhang Nan
    - Women's Singles: (Thailand) Ratchanok Intanon
    - Women's Doubles: (Indonesia) Nitya Krishinda Maheswari / Greysia Polii
    - Mixed Doubles: (South Korea) Ko Sung-hyun / Kim Ha-na
  - May 30 – June 5: 2016 Indonesia Super Series Premier in Jakarta
    - Men's Singles: (Malaysia) Lee Chong Wei
    - Men's Doubles: (South Korea) Lee Yong-dae / Yoo Yeon-seong
    - Women's Singles: (Chinese Taipei) Tai Tzu-ying
    - Women's Doubles: (Japan) Misaki Matsutomo / Ayaka Takahashi
    - Mixed Doubles: (China) Xu Chen / Ma Jin
  - June 7–12: 2016 Australian Super Series in (Australia) Sydney
    - Men's Singles: (Denmark) Hans-Kristian Vittinghus
    - Men's Doubles: (Indonesia) Marcus Fernaldi Gideon / Kevin Sanjaya Sukamuljo
    - Women's Singles: (India) Saina Nehwal
    - Women's Doubles: (China) Bao Yixin / Chen Qingchen
    - Mixed Doubles: (China) Lu Kai / Huang Yaqiong
  - September 20–25: 2016 Japan Super Series in Tokyo
    - Men's Singles: (Malaysia) Lee Chong Wei
    - Men's Doubles: (China) Li Junhui / Liu Yuchen
    - Women's Singles: (China) He Bingjiao
    - Women's Doubles: (Denmark) Christinna Pedersen / Kamilla Rytter Juhl
    - Mixed Doubles: (China) Zheng Siwei / Chen Qingchen
  - September 27 – October 2: 2016 Korea Open Super Series in (South Korea) Seoul
    - Men's Singles: (China) Qiao Bin
    - Men's Doubles: (South Korea) Lee Yong-dae / Yoo Yeon-seong
    - Women's Singles: (Japan) Akane Yamaguchi
    - Women's Doubles: (South Korea) Jung Kyung-eun / Shin Seung-chan
    - Mixed Doubles: (South Korea) Ko Sung-hyun / Kim Ha-na
  - October 18–23: 2016 Denmark Super Series Premier in Odense
    - Men's Singles: (Thailand) Tanongsak Saensomboonsuk
    - Men's Doubles: (Malaysia) Goh V Shem / Tan Wee Kiong
    - Women's Singles: (Japan) Akane Yamaguchi
    - Women's Doubles: (Japan) Misaki Matsutomo / Ayaka Takahashi
    - Mixed Doubles: (Denmark) Joachim Fischer Nielsen / Christinna Pedersen
  - October 25–30: 2016 French Super Series in (France) Paris
    - Men's Singles: (China) Shi Yuqi
    - Men's Doubles: (Denmark) Mathias Boe / Carsten Mogensen
    - Women's Singles: (China) He Bingjiao
    - Women's Doubles: (China) Chen Qingchen / Jia Yifan
    - Mixed Doubles: (China) Zheng Siwei / Chen Qingchen
  - November 15–20: 2016 China Open Super Series Premier in Fuzhou
    - Men's Singles: (Denmark) Jan Ø. Jørgensen
    - Men's Doubles: (Indonesia) Marcus Fernaldi Gideon / Kevin Sanjaya Sukamuljo
    - Women's Singles: (India) P. V. Sindhu
    - Women's Doubles: (South Korea) Chang Ye-na / Lee So-hee
    - Mixed Doubles: (Indonesia) Tontowi Ahmad / Liliyana Natsir
  - November 22–27: 2016 Hong Kong Super Series in Kowloon
    - Men's Singles: (Hong Kong) Ng Ka Long
    - Men's Doubles: (Japan) Takeshi Kamura / Keigo Sonoda
    - Women's Singles: (Chinese Taipei) Tai Tzu-ying
    - Women's Doubles: (Denmark) Kamilla Rytter Juhl / Christinna Pedersen
    - Mixed Doubles: (Indonesia) Tontowi Ahmad / Liliyana Natsir
  - December 14–18: 2016 BWF Super Series Masters Finals in (United Arab Emirates) Dubai
    - Men's Singles: (Denmark) Viktor Axelsen
    - Men's Doubles: (Malaysia) Goh V Shem / Tan Wee Kiong
    - Women's Singles: (Chinese Taipei) Tai Tzu-ying
    - Women's Doubles: (China) Chen Qingchen / Jia Yifan
    - Mixed Doubles: (China) Zheng Siwei / Chen Qingchen

== 2016 BWF Grand Prix Gold and Grand Prix ==
- January 19 – December 11: 2016 BWF Grand Prix Gold and Grand Prix Calendar of Events
  - January 19–24: 2016 Malaysia Masters Grand Prix Gold in Penang
    - Men's Singles: (Malaysia) Lee Chong Wei
    - Men's Doubles: (Indonesia) Marcus Fernaldi Gideon / Kevin Sanjaya Sukamuljo
    - Women's Singles: (India) P. V. Sindhu
    - Women's Doubles: (Japan) Misaki Matsutomo / Ayaka Takahashi
    - Mixed Doubles: (China) Zheng Siwei / Li Yinhui
  - January 26–31: 2016 Syed Modi International Grand Prix Gold in (India) Lucknow
    - Men's Singles: (India) Srikanth Kidambi
    - Men's Doubles: (Malaysia) Goh V Shem / Tan Wee Kiong
    - Women's Singles: (South Korea) Sung Ji-hyun
    - Women's Doubles: (South Korea) Jung Kyung-eun / Shin Seung-chan
    - Mixed Doubles: (Indonesia) Praveen Jordan / Debby Susanto
  - February 8–13: 2016 Thailand Masters Grand Prix Gold in Bangkok
    - Men's Singles: (South Korea) Lee Hyun-il
    - Men's Doubles: (Indonesia) Mohammad Ahsan / Hendra Setiawan
    - Women's Singles: (Thailand) Ratchanok Intanon
    - Women's Doubles: (China) Tian Qing / Zhao Yunlei
    - Mixed Doubles: (China) Zheng Siwei / Chen Qingchen
  - March 1–6: 2016 German Open Grand Prix Gold in (Germany) Mülheim
    - Men's Singles: (China) Lin Dan
    - Men's Doubles: (South Korea) Ko Sung-hyun / Shin Baek-cheol
    - Women's Singles: (China) Li Xuerui
    - Women's Doubles: (China) Huang Yaqiong / Tang Jinhua
    - Mixed Doubles: (South Korea) Ko Sung-hyun / Kim Ha-na
  - March 15–20: 2016 Swiss Open Grand Prix Gold in (Switzerland) Basel
    - Men's Singles: (India) Prannoy Kumar
    - Men's Doubles: (Denmark) Kim Astrup / Anders Skaarup Rasmussen
    - Women's Singles: (China) He Bingjiao
    - Women's Doubles: (Japan) Shizuka Matsuo / Mami Naito
    - Mixed Doubles: (China) Wang Yilyu / Chen Qingchen
  - March 22–27: 2016 New Zealand Open Grand Prix in Auckland
    - Men's Singles: (China) Huang Yuxiang
    - Men's Doubles: (South Korea) Ko Sung-hyun / Shin Baek-cheol
    - Women's Singles: (South Korea) Sung Ji-hyun
    - Women's Doubles: (Japan) Yuki Fukushima / Sayaka Hirota
    - Mixed Doubles: (Malaysia) Chan Peng Soon / Goh Liu Ying
  - April 19–24: 2016 China Masters Grand Prix Gold in Changzhou (Jiangsu)
    - Men's Singles: (China) Lin Dan
    - Men's Doubles: (South Korea) Lee Yong-dae / Yoo Yeon-seong
    - Women's Singles: (China) Li Xuerui
    - Women's Doubles: (China) Luo Ying / Luo Yu
    - Mixed Doubles: (China) Xu Chen / Ma Jin
  - June 28 – July 3: 2016 Chinese Taipei Open Grand Prix Gold in Taipei
    - Men's Singles: (Chinese Taipei) Chou Tien-chen
    - Men's Doubles: (China) Li Junhui / Liu Yuchen
    - Women's Singles: (Chinese Taipei) Tai Tzu-ying
    - Women's Doubles: (China) Huang Dongping / Zhong Qianxin
    - Mixed Doubles: (China) Zheng Siwei / Chen Qingchen
  - June 28 – July 3: 2016 Canada Open Grand Prix in Calgary
    - Men's Singles: (India) B. Sai Praneeth
    - Men's Doubles: (India) Manu Attri / B. Sumeeth Reddy
    - Women's Singles: (Canada) Michelle Li
    - Women's Doubles: (Australia) Setyana Mapasa / Gronya Somerville
    - Mixed Doubles: (Vietnam) Đỗ Tuấn Đức / Phạm Như Thảo
  - July 18–24: 2016 Vietnam Open Grand Prix in Ho Chi Minh City
    - Men's Singles: (Hong Kong) Wong Wing Ki
    - Men's Doubles: (Chinese Taipei) Lee Jhe-huei / Lee Yang
    - Women's Singles: (Singapore) Yeo Jia Min
    - Women's Doubles: (Indonesia) Della Destiara Haris / Rosyita Eka Putri Sari
    - Mixed Doubles: (Malaysia) Tan Kian Meng / Lai Pei Jing
  - August 30 – September 4: 2016 Brazil Open Grand Prix in Foz do Iguaçu
    - Men's Singles: (Malaysia) Zulfadli Zulkiffli
    - Men's Doubles: (Germany) Michael Fuchs / Fabian Holzer
    - Women's Singles: (Spain) Beatriz Corrales
    - Women's Doubles: (Germany) Barbara Bellenberg / Eva Janssens
    - Mixed Doubles: (India) Pranav Chopra / N. Sikki Reddy
  - September 6–11: 2016 Indonesian Masters Grand Prix Gold in (Indonesia) Balikpapan
    - Men's Singles: (China) Shi Yuqi
    - Men's Doubles: (Indonesia) Wahyu Nayaka / Kevin Sanjaya Sukamuljo
    - Women's Singles: (Thailand) Busanan Ongbamrungphan
    - Women's Doubles: (South Korea) Chae Yoo-jung / Kim So-yeong
    - Mixed Doubles: (Indonesia) Ronald Alexander / Melati Daeva Oktavianti
  - October 4–9: 2016 Thailand Open Grand Prix Gold in Bangkok
    - Men's Singles: (Thailand) Tanongsak Saensomboonsuk
    - Men's Doubles: (Indonesia) Berry Angriawan / Rian Agung Saputro
    - Women's Singles: (Japan) Aya Ohori
    - Women's Doubles: (Thailand) Puttita Supajirakul / Sapsiree Taerattanachai
    - Mixed Doubles: (Malaysia) Tan Kian Meng / Lai Pei Jing
  - October 4–9: 2016 Russia Open Grand Prix in Vladivostok
    - Men's Singles: (Malaysia) Zulfadli Zulkiffli
    - Men's Doubles: (Russia) Vladimir Ivanov / Ivan Sozonov
    - Women's Singles: (India) Ruthvika Gadde
    - Women's Doubles: (Russia) Anastasia Chervyakova / Olga Morozova
    - Mixed Doubles: (India) Pranav Chopra / N. Sikki Reddy
  - October 11–16: 2016 Chinese Taipei Masters in Taipei
    - Men's Singles: (India) Sourabh Varma
    - Men's Doubles: (Indonesia) Fajar Alfian / Muhammad Rian Ardianto
    - Women's Singles: (Japan) Ayumi Mine
    - Women's Doubles: (Japan) Yuki Fukushima / Sayaka Hirota
    - Mixed Doubles: (Hong Kong) Tang Chun Man / Tse Ying Suet
  - October 11–16: 2016 Dutch Open Grand Prix in (Netherlands) Almere
    - Men's Singles: (Chinese Taipei) Wang Tzu-wei
    - Men's Doubles: (Chinese Taipei) Lee Jhe-huei / Lee Yang
    - Women's Singles: (United States) Beiwen Zhang
    - Women's Doubles: (Australia) Setyana Mapasa / Gronya Somerville
    - Mixed Doubles: (Denmark) Mathias Christiansen / Sara Thygesen
  - November 1–6: 2016 Bitburger Open Grand Prix Gold in (Germany) Saarbrücken
    - Men's Singles: (China) Shi Yuqi
    - Men's Doubles: (Malaysia) Ong Yew Sin / Teo Ee Yi
    - Women's Singles: (China) He Bingjiao
    - Women's Doubles: (China) Chen Qingchen / Jia Yifan
    - Mixed Doubles: (China) Zheng Siwei / Chen Qingchen
  - November 23–27: 2016 Scottish Open Grand Prix in (Scotland) Glasgow
    - Men's Singles: (Malaysia) Soong Joo Ven
    - Men's Doubles: (Denmark) Mathias Christiansen / David Daugaard
    - Women's Singles: (Denmark) Mette Poulsen
    - Women's Doubles: (Malaysia) Amelia Alicia Anscelly / Teoh Mei Xing
    - Mixed Doubles: (Malaysia) Goh Soon Huat / Shevon Jemie Lai
  - November 29 – December 4: 2016 Macau Open Grand Prix Gold in Macau
    - Men's Singles: (China) Zhao Junpeng
    - Men's Doubles: (Chinese Taipei) Lee Jhe-huei / Lee Yang
    - Women's Singles: (China) Chen Yufei
    - Women's Doubles: (China) Chen Qingchen / Jia Yifan
    - Mixed Doubles: (China) Zhang Nan / Li Yinhui
  - December 6–11: 2016 Korea Masters Grand Prix Gold (final) in (South Korea) Jeonju
    - Men's Singles: (South Korea) Son Wan-ho
    - Men's Doubles: (South Korea) Kim Jae-hwan / Ko Sung-hyun
    - Women's Singles: (South Korea) Sung Ji-hyun
    - Women's Doubles: (South Korea) Jung Kyung-eun / Shin Seung-chan
    - Mixed Doubles: (South Korea) Ko Sung-hyun / Kim Ha-na
