= 2016 Bitburger Open Grand Prix Gold =

Tournament details
- Dates: 1 – 6 November 2016
- Level: Grand Prix Gold
- Total prize money: US$120,000
- Venue: Saarlandhalle Saarbrucken
- Location: Saarbrücken, Germany

Champions
- Men's singles: (China) Shi Yuqi
- Women's singles: (China) He Bingjiao
- Men's doubles: (Malaysia) Ong Yew Sin (Malaysia) Teo Ee Yi
- Women's doubles: (China) Chen Qingchen (China) Jia Yifan
- Mixed doubles: (China) Zheng Siwei (China) Chen Qingchen

The 2016 Bitburger Open Grand Prix Gold will be the 18th grand prix's badminton tournament of the 2016 BWF Grand Prix Gold and Grand Prix. The tournament was held at Saarlandhalle Saarbrucken in Saarbrücken in the Germany 1–6 November 2016 and had a total purse of $120,000.

== Men's singles ==
=== Seeds ===
1. (Denmark) Hans-Kristian Vittinghus (withdrew)
2. (England) Rajiv Ouseph (withdrew)
3. (Germany) Marc Zwiebler (quarterfinals)
4. (China) Shi Yuqi (champion)
5. (Indonesia) Jonatan Christie (quarterfinals)
6. (Indonesia) Ihsan Maulana Mustofa (third round)
7. (Thailand) Tanongsak Saensomboonsuk (withdrew)
8. (Chinese Taipei) Hsu Jen-hao (first round)
9. (Thailand) Boonsak Ponsana (withdrew)
10. (China) Huang Yuxiang (third round)
11. (Indonesia) Anthony Sinisuka Ginting (first round)
12. (India) Sameer Verma (semifinals)
13. (Denmark) Emil Holst (first round)
14. (China) Xue Song (second round)
15. (Denmark) Anders Antonsen (semifinals)
16. (Sweden) Henri Hurskainen (second round)

=== Finals ===
Quarterfinals
15	(Denmark) Anders Antonsen	21	19	21
PFQ	(Germany) Fabian Roth	12	21	14
3	(Germany) Marc Zwiebler	15	21	15
(India) Sourabh Varma	21	16	21
5	(Indonesia) Jonatan Christie	21	14	14
4	(China) Shi Yuqi	16	21	21
(Ukraine) Artem Pochtarov	14	16
12	(India) Sameer Verma	21	21

Semifinals
15	(Denmark) Anders Antonsen	15	18
(India) Sourabh Varma	21	21
4	(China) Shi Yuqi	21	21
12	(India) Sameer Verma	18	15

Final
(India) Sourabh Varma	19	20
4	(China) Shi Yuqi	21	22

=== Top half ===
==== Section 1 ====
First Round
PFQ	(Russia) D Grachev	11	15
(Germany) L Schaenzler	21	21
(England) M Spancer-Smith	7	9
(Netherlands) N Fransman	21	21
15	(Denmark) A Antonsen	21	21
(Chinese Taipei) Lin Y-h	19	16
PFQ	(Germany) D Peng	20	13
(Germany) D Domke	22	21

Second Round
(Germany) L Schaenzler	21	23
(Netherlands) N Fransman	14	21
15	(Denmark) A Antonsen	21	21
(Germany) D Domke	12	16

Third Round
(Germany) L Schaenzler	14	19
15	(Denmark) A Antonsen	21	21

==== Section 2 ====
First Round
PFQ	(Germany) F Roth	21	21
(Denmark) C L Thomsen	7	13
(Norway) M Myhre	16	19
(England) T Penty	21	21
16	(Sweden) H Hurskainen	21	21
(Mexico) J Castillo	16	19
(Malaysia) Goh G C	21	21
(Finland) K Koljonen	16	12

Second Round
PFQ	(Germany) F Roth	21	17	21
(England) T Penty	15	21	17
16	(Sweden) H Hurskainen	18	23	14
(Malaysia) Goh G C	21	21	21

Third Round
PFQ	(Germany) F Roth	21	20	21
(Malaysia) Goh G C	15	22	19

==== Section 3 ====
First Round
3	(Germany) M Zwiebler	21	21
PFQ	(Germany) P Discher	13	11
(Switzerland) M Bonny	17	18
Q4	(Germany) S Wang	21	21
10	(China) Huang YX	21	21
PFQ	(Germany) T Wadenka	7	11
Q5	(Malaysia) Woon K H	21	14	20
(Russia) S Sirant	19	21	22

Second Round
3	(Germany) M Zwiebler	21	21
Q4	(Germany) S Wang	11	16
10	(China) Huang YX	21	21
(Russia) S Sirant	17	13

Third Round
3	(Germany) M Zwiebler	11	21	21
10	(China) Huang YX	21	19	19

==== Section 4 ====
First Round
6	(Indonesia) I M Mustofa	21	21
(India) S Verma	17	16
(Sweden) M Westerback	21	21
(Austria) V Vattanirappel	9	17
14	(China) Xue S	21	21
Q8	(Bulgaria) A Vlaar	13	16
Q2	(Austria) R Gnedt	16	11
(India) S Varma	21	21

Second Round
6	(Indonesia) I M Mustofa	21	21
(Sweden) M Westerback	16	16
14	(China) Xue S	9^{r}
(India) S Varma	16

Third Round
6	(Indonesia) I M Mustofa	11	20
(India) S Varma	21	22

=== Bottom half ===
==== Section 5 ====
First Round
(Austria) L Wraber	22	15	18
(Netherlands) M Caljouw	20	21	21
(Thailand) K Phetpradab	21	21
11	(Indonesia) A S Ginting	19	14
(Slovakia) M Hlinican	21	21
(Malaysia) Chiang J S	19	19
(India) S Dey	19	18
5	(Indonesia) J Christie	21	21

Second Round
(Netherlands) M Caljouw	21	21
(Thailand) K Phetpradab	17	18
(Slovakia) M Hlinican	12	14
5	(Indonesia) J Christie	21	21

Third Round
(Netherlands) M Caljouw	17	21	18
5	(Indonesia) J Christie	21	8	21

==== Section 6 ====
First Round
PFQ	(Belgium) N Vervaeke	16	21	13
Q7	(Poland) M Poulakowski	21	18	21
(Germany) K Schaefer	21	21
13	(Denmark) E Holst	14	13
(Czech Republic) A Mendrek	7	8
(Netherlands) E Meijs	21	21
Q3	(Germany) C Skrzeba	9	7
4	(China) Shi YQ	21	21

Second Round
Q7	(Poland) M Poulakowski	11	10
(Germany) K Schaefer	21	21
(Netherlands) E Meijs	17	17
4	(China) Shi YQ	21	21

Third Round
(Germany) K Schaefer	20	17
4	(China) Shi YQ	22	21

==== Section 7 ====
First Round
(Republic of Ireland) J Magee	15	18
(Slovenia) A Roj	21	14^{r}
(Ukraine) A Pochtarev	21	26
PFQ	(Switzerland) J Koenig	17	24
Q1	(Germany) H Gerberich	9	21	20
(Bulgaria) I Rusev	21	17	22
(Denmark) K Bruun	18	21	21
8	(Chinese Taipei) Hsu J-h	21	10	16

Second Round
(Republic of Ireland) J Magee	18	18
(Ukraine) A Pochtarev	21	21
(Bulgaria) I Rusev	6	9^{r}
(Denmark) K Bruun	21	14

Third Round
(Ukraine) A Pochtarev	21	8	21
(Denmark) K Bruun	13	21	16

==== Section 8 ====
First Round
(Finland) E Heino	21	21
PFQ	(Austria) W Gnedt	15	12
Q6	(Germany) A Roovers	11	11
12	(India) S Verma	21	21
(Scotland) K Merrilees	21	21
(United States) B Seguin	15	15
(Russia) V Malkov	21	21
PFQ	(Luxembourg) R Mann	16	17

Second Round
(Finland) E Heino	10	16
12	(India) S Verma	21	21
(Scotland) K Merrilees	14	21	21
(Russia) V Malkov	21	12	16

Third Round
12	(India) S Verma	21	21
(Scotland) K Merrilees	17	17

== Women's singles ==
=== Seeds ===
1. (China) He Bingjiao (champion)
2. (Thailand) Porntip Buranaprasertsuk (semifinals)
3. (Thailand) Busanan Ongbamrungphan (semifinals)
4. (Thailand) Nitchaon Jindapol (final)
5. (Bulgaria) Linda Zetchiri (first round)
6. (Spain) Beatriz Corrales (quarterfinals)
7. (Denmark) Anna Thea Madsen (withdrew)
8. (Germany) Olga Konon (first round)

=== Finals ===
Semifinals
1	(China) He Bingjiao	18	21	21
3	(Thailand) Busanan Ongbamrungphan	21	18	18
4	(Thailand) Nitchaon Jindapol	21	21
2	(Thailand) Porntip Buranaprasertsuk	17	12

Final
1	(China) He Bingjiao	21	21
4	(Thailand) Nitchaon Jindapol	11	18

=== Top half ===
==== Section 1 ====
First Round
1	(China) He BJ	21	21
(Germany) F Deprez	17	14
(India) G R Shivani	21	21
(Netherlands) S De Visch Eijbergen	11	13
PFQ	(Bulgaria) M Mitsova	21	14
(Russia) N Perminova	23	21
(Germany) L Heim	12	18
(Denmark) M Poulsen	21	21

Second Round
1	(China) He BJ	21	21
(India) G R Shivani	16	13
(Russia) N Perminova	17	13
(Denmark) M Poulsen	21	21

Quarterfinals
1	(China) He BJ	21	21
(Denmark) M Poulsen	16	15

==== Section 2 ====
First Round
3	(Thailand) B Ongbamrungphan	21	21
(Denmark) S H Dahl	14	13
(Denmark) J Finne-Ipsen	21	21
Q1	(Switzerland) C Hantz	12	17
5	(Bulgaria) L Zetchiri	17	19
(Finland) N Vainio	21	21
(Switzerland) S Jaquet	18	21	21
(Ukraine) M Ulitina	21	16	12

Second Round
3	(Thailand) B Ongbamrungphan	21	21
(Denmark) J Finne-Ipsen	7	10
(Finland) N Vainio	12	17
(Switzerland) S Jaquet	21	21

Quarterfinals
3	(Thailand) B Ongbamrungphan	21	21
(Switzerland) S Jaquet	9	11

=== Bottom half ===
==== Section 3 ====
First Round
(Chinese Taipei) Lee C-h	21	21
PFQ	(Ukraine) N Voytsekh	13	13
(Denmark) M Blichfeldt	w	/	o
8	(Germany) O Konon
(Russia) K Polikarpova	21	15	22
(Denmark) N K Rohde	10	21	24
Q2	(Indonesia) P Siahaya	21	14	14
4	(Thailand) N Jindapol	19	21	21

Second Round
(Chinese Taipei) Lee C-h	21	21
(Denmark) M Blichfeldt	17	13
(Denmark) N K Rohde	21	5	13
4	(Thailand) N Jindapol	19	21	21

Quarterfinals
(Chinese Taipei) Lee C-h	21	14	9
4	(Thailand) N Jindapol	10	21	21

==== Section 4 ====
First Round
(Netherlands) G Mahulette	21	21
(India) T Lad	14	17
Q3	(Russia) V Slobodyanyuk	17	15
6	(Spain) B Corrales	21	21
Q4	(Czech Republic) K Tomalova	21	23
(Estonia) G Saar	15	21
(England) C Birch	7	15
2	(Thailand) P Buranaprasertsuk	21	21

Second Round
(Netherlands) G Mahulette	19	15
6	(Spain) B Corrales	21	21
Q4	(Czech Republic) K Tomalova	10	13
2	(Thailand) P Buranaprasertsuk	21	21

Quarterfinals
6	(Spain) B Corrales	12	7
2	(Thailand) P Buranaprasertsuk	21	21

== Men's doubles ==
=== Seeds ===
1. (China) Li Junhui / Liu Yuchen (withdrew)
2. (Denmark) Mathias Boe / Carsten Mogensen (withdrew)
3. (Denmark) Mads Conrad-Petersen / Mads Pieler Kolding (withdrew)
4. (Chinese Taipei) Chen Hung-ling / Wang Chi-lin (semifinals)
5. (England) Marcus Ellis / Chris Langridge (first round)
6. (Denmark) Kim Astrup / Anders Skaarup Rasmussen (semifinals)
7. (Thailand) Bodin Issara / Nipitphon Puangpuapech (withdrew)
8. (Germany) Michael Fuchs / Johannes Schoettler (final)

=== Finals ===
Semifinals
8	(Germany) Michael Fuchs (Germany) Johannes Schoettler	21	10	21
6	(Denmark) Kim Astrup (Denmark) Anders Skaarup Rasmussen	15	21	15
4	(Chinese Taipei) Chen Hung-ling (Chinese Taipei) Wang Chi-lin	16	21	17
(Malaysia) Ong Yew Sin (Malaysia) Teo Ee Yi	21	18	21

Final
8	(Germany) Michael Fuchs (Germany) Johannes Schoettler	16	18
(Malaysia) Ong Yew Sin (Malaysia) Teo Ee Yi	21	21

=== Top half ===
==== Section 1 ====
First Round
PFQ	(Germany) R Domke (Germany) J Pistorius	19	16
Q1	(Scotland) A Hall (England) P Mills	21	21
(Singapore) Terry Hee Y K (Singapore) Loh K H	15	16
(Republic of Ireland) J Magee (Republic of Ireland) S Magee	21	21
8	(Germany) M Fuchs (Germany) J Schoettler	21	20	23
(India) A Dewalkar (India) T Kona	13	22	21
(England) M Nottingham (England) H Towler	21	21
Q4	(Malaysia) Y Khrishnan (India) K Singh	6	11

Second Round
Q1	(Scotland) A Hall (England) P Mills	21	21
(Republic of Ireland) J Magee (Republic of Ireland) S Magee	18	15
8	(Germany) M Fuchs (Germany) J Schoettler	19	21	21
(England) M Nottingham (England) H Towler	21	12	15

Quarterfinals
Q1	(Scotland) A Hall (England) P Mills	16	18
8	(Germany) M Fuchs (Germany) J Schoettler	21	21

==== Section 2 ====
First Round
PFQ	(Austria) V Vattanirappel (Austria) L Wraber	12	11
(Germany) R Beck (Germany) P Kaesbauer	21	21
(Denmark) M Christiansen (Denmark) D Daugaard	21	19	21
PFQ	(Germany) D Benz (Germany) A Heinz	12	21	11
6	(Denmark) K Astrup (Denmark) A S Rasmussen	21	19	21
(Ukraine) G Natarov (Ukraine) A Pochtarev	18	21	13
(Belgium) M Dierickx (Belgium) F Golinski	21	21
(Scotland) M Campbell (Scotland) P Machugh	19	16

Second Round
(Germany) R Beck (Germany) P Kaesbauer	15	18
(Denmark) M Christiansen (Denmark) D Daugaard	21	21
6	(Denmark) K Astrup (Denmark) A S Rasmussen	21	21
(Belgium) M Dierickx (Belgium) F Golinski	13	8

Quarterfinals
(Denmark) M Christiansen (Denmark) D Daugaard	18	21	19
6	(Denmark) K Astrup (Denmark) A S Rasmussen	21	16	21

=== Bottom half ===
==== Section 3 ====
First Round
(Sweden) R Eidestedt (Sweden) N Ruponen	11	20
(Germany) J R Jansen (Germany) J Zurwonne	21	22
(Singapore) D B Chrisnanta (Singapore) H Wijaya	21	21
PFQ	(Russia) E Dremin (Russia) D Grachev	15	17
(England) B Lane (England) S Vendy	21	21
(Mexico) J Castillo (Germany) N Persson	18	19
(Austria) D Stipsits (Austria) R Zirnwald	12	6
4	(Chinese Taipei) Chen H-l (Chinese Taipei) Wang C-l	21	21

Second Round
(Germany) J R Jansen (Germany) J Zurwonne	21	21
(Singapore) D B Chrisnanta (Singapore) H Wijaya	16	15
(England) B Lane (England) S Vendy	10	11
4	(Chinese Taipei) Chen H-l (Chinese Taipei) Wang C-l	21	21

Quarterfinals
(Germany) J R Jansen (Germany) J Zurwonne	21	10
4	(Chinese Taipei) Chen H-l (Chinese Taipei) Wang C-l	23	21

==== Section 4 ====
First Round
Q3	(Denmark) K Antonsen (Denmark) F Søgaard	w	/	o
(Germany) M Lamsfuss (Germany) M E Seidel
(China) Huang KX (China) Wang YL	17	21	21
5	(England) M Ellis (England) C Langridge	21	11	17
Q2	(Switzerland) M Bonny (Switzerland) G Tripet	12	11
(Germany) B Geiss (Germany) F Holzer	21	21
(Malaysia) Ong Y S (Malaysia) Teo E Y	21	22
PFQ	(Austria) J Koch (Denmark) C L Thomsen	7	20

Second Round
Q3	(Denmark) K Antonsen (Denmark) F Søgaard	14	13
(China) Huang KX (China) Wang YL	21	21
(Germany) B Geiss (Germany) F Holzer	19	11
(Malaysia) Ong Y S (Malaysia) Teo E Y	21	21

Quarterfinals
(China) Huang KX (China) Wang YL	15	26	18
(Malaysia) Ong Y S (Malaysia) Teo E Y	21	24	21

== Women's doubles ==
=== Seeds ===
1. (China) Chen Qingchen / Jia Yifan (champion)
2. (Thailand) Jongkolphan Kititharakul / Rawinda Prajongjai (final)
3. (Denmark) Maiken Fruergaard / Sara Thygesen (quarterfinals)
4. (Indonesia) Tiara Rosalia Nuraidah / Rizki Amelia Pradipta (semifinals)

=== Finals ===
Semifinals
1	(China) Chen Qingchen (China) Jia Yifan	20	21	21
4	(Indonesia) Tiara Rosalia Nuraidah (Indonesia) Rizki Amelia Pradipta	22	13	15
(China) Huang Dongping (China) Li Yinhui	11	21	18
2	(Thailand) Jongkolphan Kititharakul (Thailand) Rawinda Prajongjai	21	18	21

Final
1	(China) Chen Qingchen (China) Jia Yifan	21	21
2	(Thailand) Jongkolphan Kititharakul (Thailand) Rawinda Prajongjai	12	19

=== Top half ===
==== Section 1 ====
First Round
1	(China) Chen QC (China) Jia YF
BYE
(Denmark) J Finne-Ipsen (Denmark) R S Hansen	20	21	15
(Malaysia) Lee Z Q (India) P Sawant	22	17	21
(Russia) A Chervyakova (Russia) O Morozova	w	/	o
(France) E Lefel (France) A Tran
(Germany) L Kaminski (Germany) H Pohl	12	19
(Bulgaria) M Mitsova (Bulgaria) P Nedelcheva	21	21

Second Round
1	(China) Chen QC (China) Jia YF	21	21
(Malaysia) Lee Z Q (India) P Sawant	14	13
(Russia) A Chervyakova (Russia) O Morozova	21	21
(Bulgaria) M Mitsova (Bulgaria) P Nedelcheva	17	10

Quarterfinals
1	(China) Chen QC (China) Jia YF	21	21
(Russia) A Chervyakova (Russia) O Morozova	16	12

==== Section 2 ====
First Round
4	(Indonesia) T R Nuraidah (Indonesia) R A Pradipta	21	21
(Chinese Taipei) Chiang K-h (Chinese Taipei) Hung S-h	18	13
(Netherlands) C Seinen (Netherlands) I Tabeling	16	14
(Germany) B Michels (Germany) K Schnaase	21	21
(England) C Birch (England) L Smith	19	17
(Sweden) C Nistad (Sweden) E Wengberg	21	21
(Germany) A Horbach (Germany) T Wurm	7	9
(Germany) K Ostermeyer (Indonesia) P Siahaya	21	21

Second Round
4	(Indonesia) T R Nuraidah (Indonesia) R A Pradipta	21	18	21
(Germany) B Michels (Germany) K Schnaase	7	21	15
(Sweden) C Nistad (Sweden) E Wengberg	18	21	21
(Germany) K Ostermeyer (Indonesia) P Siahaya	21	19	19

Quarterfinals
4	(Indonesia) T R Nuraidah (Indonesia) R A Pradipta	21	21
(Sweden) C Nistad (Sweden) E Wengberg	15	14

=== Bottom half ===
==== Section 3 ====
First Round
(Chinese Taipei) Lin X-m (Chinese Taipei) Wu F-c	w	/	o
(Japan) M Kashihara (Japan) M Kato
(England) S Brown (England) S Walker
(China) Huang DP (China) Li YH	w	/	o
(Germany) E Janssens (Germany) F Volkmann	21	21
(Luxembourg) T Aulner (Luxembourg) S Hargiono	13	11
(Germany) L Kaepplein (Germany) J Karnott	12	9
3	(Denmark) M Fruergaard (Denmark) S Thygesen	21	21

Second Round
(Chinese Taipei) Lin X-m (Chinese Taipei) Wu F-c	14	19
(China) Huang DP (China) Li YH	21	21
(Germany) E Janssens (Germany) F Volkmann	14	10
3	(Denmark) M Fruergaard (Denmark) S Thygesen	21	21

Quarterfinals
(China) Huang DP (China) Li YH	21	21
3	(Denmark) M Fruergaard (Denmark) S Thygesen	18	14

==== Section 4 ====
First Round
(Finland) M Lindholm (Finland) J Nyström	8	21	11
(Germany) B Bellenberg (Germany) L Efler	21	15	21
(Switzerland) N Fankhauser (Malaysia) S Saniru	16	14
(Germany) I Herttrich (Germany) C Nelte	21	21
(Switzerland) C Burkart (Switzerland) C Hantz	9	12
(England) H Olver (England) J Pugh	21	21
BYE
2	(Thailand) J Kititharakul (Thailand) R Prajongjai

Second Round
(Germany) B Bellenberg (Germany) L Efler	14	13
(Germany) I Herttrich (Germany) C Nelte	21	21
(England) H Olver (England) J Pugh	10	15
2	(Thailand) J Kititharakul (Thailand) R Prajongjai	21	21

Quarterfinals
(Germany) I Herttrich (Germany) C Nelte	21	4	18
2	(Thailand) J Kititharakul (Thailand) R Prajongjai	18	21	21

== Mixed doubles ==
=== Seeds ===
1. (England) Chris Adcock / Gabrielle Adcock (final)
2. (China) Zheng Siwei / Chen Qingchen (champion)
3. (Thailand) Bodin Issara / Savitree Amitrapai (withdrew)
4. (Malaysia) Tan Kian Meng / Lai Pei Jing (semifinals)
5. (Singapore) Terry Hee Yong Kai / Tan Wei Han (second round)
6. (Indonesia) Hafiz Faisal / Shella Devi Aulia (first round)
7. (China) Wang Yilu / Huang Dongping (quarterfinals)
8. (Republic of Ireland) Sam Magee / Chloe Magee (quarterfinals)

=== Finals ===
Semifinals
1	(England) Chris Adcock (England) Gabrielle Adcock	21	21
4	(Malaysia) Tan Kian Meng (Malaysia) Lai Pei Jing	15	18
(Sweden) Nico Ruponen (Sweden) Amanda Hogstrom	15	14
2	(China) Zheng Siwei (China) Chen Qingchen	21	21

Final
1	(England) Chris Adcock (England) Gabrielle Adcock	16	21
2	(China) Zheng Siwei (China) Chen Qingchen	21	23

=== Top half ===
==== Section 1 ====
First Round
1	(England) C Adcock (England) G Adcock	21	25	21
(Indonesia) A E Prasetya (Indonesia) A Saufika	14	27	11
(Russia) E Dremin (Russia) E Dimova	26	25
(England) B Lane (England) J Pugh	24	23
7	(China) Wang YL (China) Huang DP	21	21
PFQ	(Germany) J Pistorius (Germany) B Bellenberg	12	10
(Thailand) N Puangpuapech (Thailand) J Kititharakul	w	/	o
(Germany) M Lamsfuss (Germany) I Herttrich

Second Round
1	(England) C Adcock (England) G Adcock	21	21
(Russia) E Dremin (Russia) E Dimova	16	18
7	(China) Wang YL (China) Huang DP	21	21
(Thailand) N Puangpuapech (Thailand) J Kititharakul	14	17

Quarterfinals
1	(England) C Adcock (England) G Adcock	21	18	23
7	(China) Wang YL (China) Huang DP	16	21	21

==== Section 2 ====
First Round
4	(Malaysia) Tan K M (Malaysia) Lai P J	21	21
(Chinese Taipei) Wang C-l (Chinese Taipei) Chiang K-h	13	18
Q2	(Denmark) A S Rasmussen (Denmark) M Fruergaard	18	17
(Malaysia) Y Khrishnan (India) P Sawant	21	21
5	(Singapore) Terry Hee Y K (Singapore) Tan W H	21	21
(Czech Republic) J Bitman (Czech Republic) A Basova	17	17
(Switzerland) G Tripet (Switzerland) S Jaquet	21	17	16
(Germany) M E Seidel (Germany) B Michels	17	21	21

Second Round
4	(Malaysia) Tan K M (Malaysia) Lai P J	21	21
(Malaysia) Y Khrishnan (India) P Sawant	15	11
5	(Singapore) Terry Hee Y K (Singapore) Tan W H	21	17	29
(Germany) M E Seidel (Germany) B Michels	9	21	30

Quarterfinals
4	(Malaysia) Tan K M (Malaysia) Lai P J	21	20	21
(Germany) M E Seidel (Germany) B Michels	18	22	14

=== Bottom half ===
==== Section 3 ====
First Round
(Netherlands) R Jille (Netherlands) I Tabeling	15	19
Q1	(Germany) R Beck (Germany) C Nelte	21	21
Q4	(Germany) B Geiss (Germany) E Janssens	11	14
8	(Republic of Ireland) S Magee (Republic of Ireland) C Magee	21	21
(Germany) F Holzer (Germany) L Kaepplein	18	16
(Sweden) N Ruponen (Sweden) A Hogstrom	21	21
(Switzerland) O Schaller (Switzerland) C Burkart	21	14	25
PFQ	(Germany) T Wadenka (Ukraine) N Voytsekh	14	21	23

Second Round
Q1	(Germany) R Beck (Germany) C Nelte	20	12
8	(Republic of Ireland) S Magee (Republic of Ireland) C Magee	22	21
(Sweden) N Ruponen (Sweden) A Hogstrom	25	21
(Switzerland) O Schaller (Switzerland) C Burkart	23	19

Quarterfinals
8	(Republic of Ireland) S Magee (Republic of Ireland) C Magee	12	12
(Sweden) N Ruponen (Sweden) A Hogstrom	21	21

==== Section 4 ====
First Round
(England) M Nottingham (England) E Westwood	21	21
(Russia) A Parakhodin (Russia) A Chervyakova	11	9
(Germany) M Fuchs (Germany) L Efler	20	21	21
6	(Indonesia) H Faisal (Indonesia) S D Aulia	22	16	15
(Denmark) M Christiansen (Denmark) S Thygesen	12	16
Q3	(China) Huang KX (China) Li YH	21	21
(Chinese Taipei) Chang K-c (Chinese Taipei) Chang H-t	16	12
2	(China) Zheng SW (China) Chen QC	21	21

Second Round
(England) M Nottingham (England) E Westwood	14	15
(Germany) M Fuchs (Germany) L Efler	21	21
Q3	(China) Huang KX (China) Li YH	11	17
2	(China) Zheng SW (China) Chen QC	21	21

Quarterfinals
(Germany) M Fuchs (Germany) L Efler	13	12
2	(China) Zheng SW (China) Chen QC	21	21

Preceded by 2016 Dutch Open Grand Prix	BWF Grand Prix and Grand Prix Gold; 2016 BWF Season	Succeeded by 2016 Scottish Open Grand Prix
