= Bianca de Oliveira Lima =

Brazilian badminton player (born 1996)

Personal information
- Born: Bianca de Oliveira Lima; 27 August 1996 (age 30)

Sport
- Country: Brazil
- Sport: Badminton

Women's singles & doubles
- Highest ranking: 257 (WS 30 August 2018); 141 (WD 22 September 2016); 185 (XD 20 April 2017)
- BWF profile
Medal record
Women's badminton
Representing Brazil
Pan Am Championships
Silver medal – second place	2017 Santo Domingo	Mixed team
Bronze medal – third place	2019 Lima	Mixed team
Pan Am Women's Team Championships
Bronze medal – third place	2020 Salvador	Women's team

Bianca de Oliveira Lima (born 27 August 1996) is a Brazilian badminton player.

== Career ==
Her partner is Naira Vier. Both of them became the runner-up at the 2016 Brazil Open Grand Prix after defeated by the German pair Barbara Bellenberg and Eva Janssens in the final round.

== Achievements ==
=== BWF Grand Prix ===
The BWF Grand Prix has two levels, the BWF Grand Prix and Grand Prix Gold. It is a series of badminton tournaments sanctioned by the Badminton World Federation (BWF) since 2007.

Women's doubles
Year	Tournament	Partner	Opponent	Score	Result
2016	Brasil Open	(Brazil) Naira Vier	(Germany) Barbara Bellenberg (Germany) Eva Janssens	7–21, 10–21	(silver) Runner up

BWF Grand Prix Gold tournament
BWF Grand Prix tournament

=== BWF International Challenge/Series ===
Women's singles
Year	Tournament	Opponent	Score	Result
2017	Mercosul International	(Brazil) Fabiana Silva	10–21, 8–21	(silver) Runner-up

Women's doubles
Year	Tournament	Partner	Opponent	Score	Result
2019	Brazil International	(Brazil) Mariana Freitas	(Brazil) Jaqueline Lima (Brazil) Sâmia Lima	7–21, 10–21	(silver) Runner-up

BWF International Challenge tournament
BWF International Series tournament
BWF Future Series tournament
