= Naira Beatriz Vier =

Brazilian badminton player (born 1996)

Personal information
- Born: 12 July 1996 (age 30)

Sport
- Country: Brazil
- Sport: Badminton
- Handedness: Right

Women's Doubles
- Highest ranking: 141 (22 Sep 2016)
- Current ranking: 150 (6 Oct 2016)
- BWF profile

Naira Beatriz Vier (born 12 July 1996) is a Brazilian female badminton player.

== Career ==
Her partner is Bianca Lima. Both of them were defeated in the final round by the German pair Barbara Bellenberg and Eva Janssens at the 2016 Brazil Open Grand Prix.

== Achievements ==
=== BWF Grand Prix ===
The BWF Grand Prix has two level such as Grand Prix and Grand Prix Gold. It is a series of badminton tournaments, sanctioned by Badminton World Federation (BWF) since 2007.

Women's Doubles
Year	Tournament	Partner	Opponent	Score	Result
2016	Brasil Open	(Brazil) Bianca Lima	(Germany) Barbara Bellenberg (Germany) Eva Janssens	7-21, 10–21	(silver) Runner up

BWF Grand Prix Gold tournament
BWF Grand Prix tournament
