= Jones Ralfy Jansen =

Indonesian-German badminton player

Personal information
- Born: 12 November 1992 (age 33) Jakarta, Indonesia
- Height: 1.75 m (5 ft 9 in)

Sport
- Country: Indonesia (2010–2011); Germany (2012–present)
- Sport: Badminton
- Handedness: Right

Men's & mixed doubles
- Highest ranking: 22 (MD with Josche Zurwonne, 28 June 2018); 24 (XD with Linda Efler, 20 December 2022)
- Current ranking: 54 (MD with Bjarne Geiss, 30 June 2026)
- BWF profile
Medal record
Men's badminton
Representing Germany
European Mixed Team Championships
Silver medal – second place	2019 Copenhagen	Mixed team
Bronze medal – third place	2021 Vantaa	Mixed team
Bronze medal – third place	2023 Aire-sur-la-Lys	Mixed team
Bronze medal – third place	2025 Baku	Mixed team
European Men's Team Championships
Bronze medal – third place	2018 Kazan	Men's team
Representing Indonesia
Asian Junior Championships
Bronze medal – third place	2010 Kuala Lumpur	Boys' doubles
Bronze medal – third place	2010 Kuala Lumpur	Mixed team

Jones Ralfy Jansen (born 28 April 1992) is an Indonesian-born German badminton player who currently represents Germany. He was a former PB Djarum players and has joined that club in 2007. In 2010, he awarded as the best Djarum player. He won his first senior international title at the 2013 Portugal International tournament in the mixed doubles event partnered with Keshya Nurvita Hanadia. He also won the 2014 Finnish and Turkey International tournaments with his sister Cisita Joity Jansen.

== Personal life ==
His father Joy Jansen is German, while his mother Meity Rumayar is Indonesian. He was born and raised in Indonesia with his elder sister Cisita Joity Jansen who is also a badminton player.

== Achievements ==
=== Asian Junior Championships ===
Boys' doubles
Year	Venue	Partner	Opponent	Score	Result
2010	Stadium Juara; Kuala Lumpur, Malaysia	(Indonesia) Dandi Prabudita	(Malaysia) Ow Yao Han (Malaysia) Yew Hong Kheng	10–21, 7–21	Bronze

=== BWF Grand Prix (1 runner-up) ===
The BWF Grand Prix had two levels, the Grand Prix and Grand Prix Gold. It was a series of badminton tournaments sanctioned by the Badminton World Federation (BWF) and played between 2007 and 2017.

Men's doubles
Year	Tournament	Partner	Opponent	Score	Result
2016	Brasil Open	(Germany) Josche Zurwonne	(Germany) Michael Fuchs (Germany) Fabian Holzer	19–21, 18–21	(silver) Runner-up

BWF Grand Prix Gold tournament
BWF Grand Prix tournament

=== BWF International Challenge/Series (12 titles, 8 runners-up) ===
Men's doubles
Year	Tournament	Partner	Opponent	Score	Result
2012	Slovenian International	(Germany) Andreas Heinz	(Croatia) Zvonimir Đurkinjak (Croatia) Zvonimir Hölbling	21–17, 17–21, 12–21	(silver) Runner-up
2014	Polish International	(Germany) Daniel Benz	(Poland) Adam Cwalina (Poland) Przemysław Wacha	8–11, 11–6, 5–11, 11–8, 9–11	(silver) Runner-up
2016	Estonian International	(Germany) Josche Zurwonne	(Scotland) Martin Campbell (Scotland) Patrick MacHugh	21–15, 21–18	(gold) Winner
2016	White Nights	(Germany) Josche Zurwonne	(France) Bastian Kersaudy (France) Julien Maio	21–15, 21–14	(gold) Winner
2016	Irish Open	(Germany) Josche Zurwonne	(Chinese Taipei) Liao Min-chun (Chinese Taipei) Su Ching-heng	27–25, 23–21	(gold) Winner
2016	Italian International	(Germany) Josche Zurwonne	(Sweden) Richard Eidestedt (Sweden) Nico Ruponen	21–17, 21–18	(gold) Winner
2019	Finnish Open	(Germany) Peter Käsbauer	(Indonesia) Muhammad Shohibul Fikri (Indonesia) Bagas Maulana	17–21, 17–21	(silver) Runner-up
2019	Lagos International	(Germany) Peter Käsbauer	(India) Arjun M.R. (India) Ramchandran Shlok	21–11, 21–8	(gold) Winner
2019	Irish Open	(Germany) Peter Käsbauer	(Scotland) Alexander Dunn (Scotland) Adam Hall	21–19, 17–21, 21–18	(gold) Winner
2022	Uganda International	(Germany) Jan Colin Völker	(Malaysia) Boon Xin Yuan (Malaysia) Wong Tien Ci	15–21, 14–21	(silver) Runner-up
2022	Mexican International	(Germany) Jan Colin Völker	(Japan) Shuntaro Mezaki (Japan) Haruya Nishida	15–21, 16–21	(silver) Runner-up
2023	Egypt International	(Germany) Kenneth Neumann	(France) Louis Ducrot (France) Quentin Ronget	14–21, 17–21	(silver) Runner-up

Mixed doubles
Year	Tournament	Partner	Opponent	Score	Result
2013	Portugal International	(Indonesia) Keshya Nurvita Hanadia	(Denmark) Anders Skaarup Rasmussen (Denmark) Lena Grebak	21–16, 18–21, 21–16	(gold) Winner
2013	Slovenian International	(Germany) Cisita Joity Jansen	(Croatia) Zvonimir Đurkinjak (Croatia) Staša Poznanović	12–21, 18–21	(silver) Runner-up
2014	Finnish International	(Germany) Cisita Joity Jansen	(Russia) Alexandr Zinchenko (Russia) Olga Morozova	15–21, 21–17, 21–16	(gold) Winner
2014	Turkey International	(Germany) Cisita Joity Jansen	(Indonesia) Marcus Fernaldi Gideon (Bulgaria) Gabriela Stoeva	17–21, 21–17, 21–12	(gold) Winner
2015	Romanian International	(Germany) Cisita Joity Jansen	(India) Tarun Kona (India) N. Sikki Reddy	7–11, 8–11, 4–11	(silver) Runner-up
2022	Ukraine Open	(Germany) Linda Efler	(Germany) Jan Colin Völker (Germany) Stine Küspert	21–12, 21–11	(gold) Winner
2023	Egypt International	(Germany) Julia Meyer	(Algeria) Koceila Mammeri (Algeria) Tanina Mammeri	21–19, 21–18	(gold) Winner
2024	Estonian International	(Germany) Thuc Phuong Nguyen	(Sweden) Ludwig Axelsson (Sweden) Jessica Silvennoinen	21–14, 21–18	(gold) Winner

BWF International Challenge tournament
BWF International Series tournament
