= Anand Pawar =

Indian badminton player (born 1986)

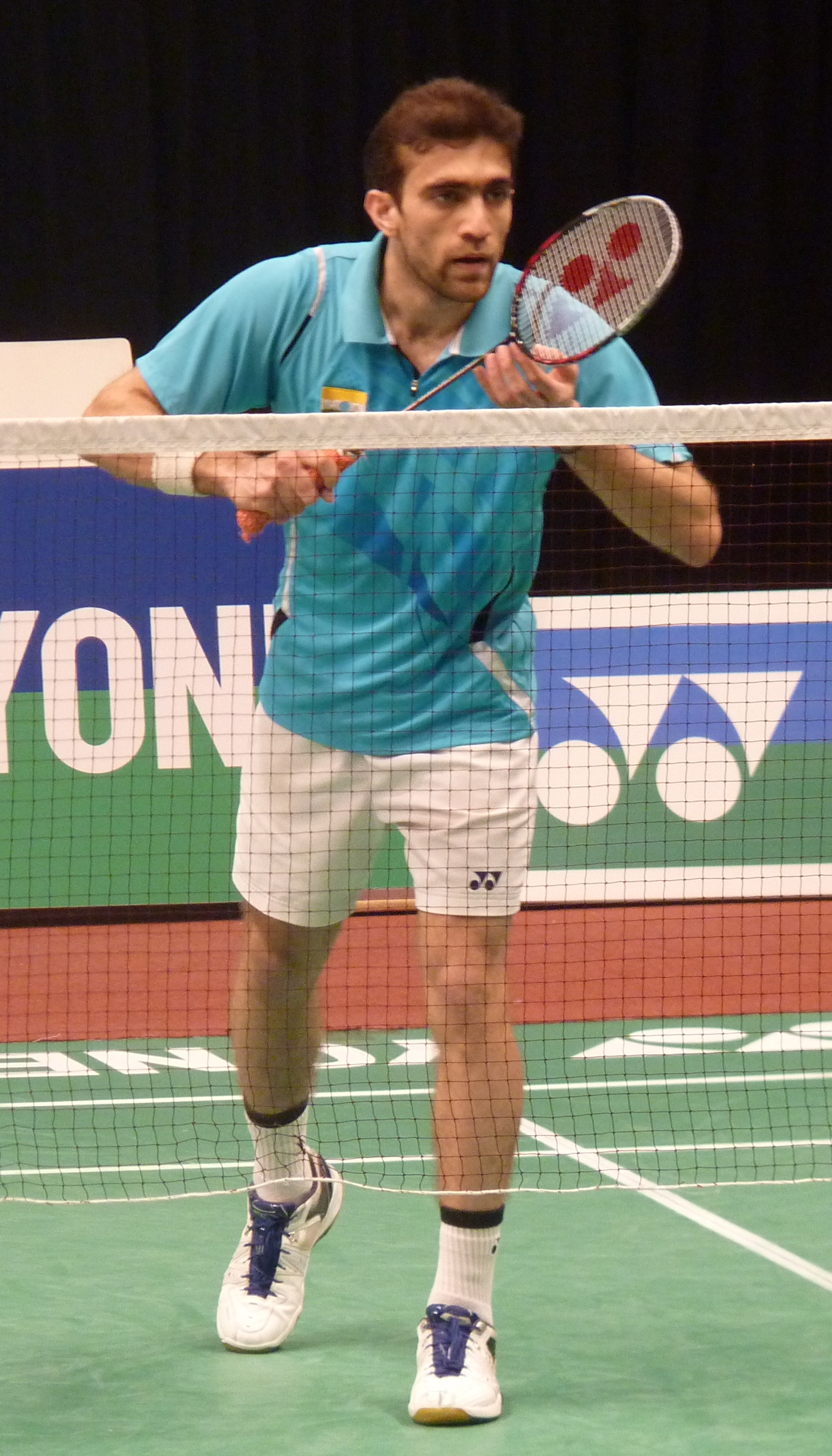

Personal information
- Born: Anand Pawar; 18 July 1986 (age 40) Mumbai, India
- Height: 5’8"

Sport
- Country: India
- Sport: Badminton
- Handedness: Right
- Coached by: Uday Pawar & Morten Frost

Men's singles
- Highest ranking: 30 (21 November 2013)
- Current ranking: 52 (26 March 2015)
- BWF profile
Medal record
Men's badminton
Representing India
Commonwealth Youth Games
Silver medal – second place	2004 Bendigo	Mixed team

Anand Pawar (born 18 July 1986) is a male Indian badminton player who has represented India in the Men's World Team Championships (Thomas Cup) & World Mixed Team Championships ( Sudirman Cup ) & Asian Badminton Championships. He is a Bronze Medallist (Semi-Finalist) in the India Super Series 2013 and has been ranked as high as 30 in the world. In 2008, he won the Portugal International, Hungarian International and the Austrian International. He has also won the Scottish Open in 2010 and 2012 as well as the French International in 2012. He is the assistant coach of the new Pune7Aces professional badminton team in the Premier Badminton League

== Achievements ==
=== BWF Grand Prix ===
The BWF Grand Prix has two level such as Grand Prix and Grand Prix Gold. It is a series of badminton tournaments, sanctioned by Badminton World Federation (BWF) since 2007.

Men's Singles
Year	Tournament	Opponent	Score	Result
2016	Brasil Open	(Malaysia) Zulfadli Zulkiffli	21–18, 11–21, 17–21	(silver) Runner-up

BWF Grand Prix Gold tournament
BWF Grand Prix tournament

=== BWF International Challenge/Series ===
Men's Singles
Year	Tournament	Opponent	Score	Result
2017	Dutch International	(Finland) Kalle Koljonen	20–22, 21–19, 21–17	(gold) Winner
2014	Bahrain International Challenge	(Indonesia) Firman Abdul Kholik	22–20, 13–21, 13–21	(silver) Runner-up
2014	Sri Lanka International	(South Korea) Lee Hyun-il	21–17, 10–21, 15–21	(silver) Runner-up
2012	Scottish International	(Japan) Kazumasa Sakai	10–21, 21–11, 21–17	(gold) Winner
2012	Dutch International	(Indonesia) Andre Kurniawan Tedjono	Walkover	(silver) Runner-up
2012	French International	(Malaysia) Misbun Ramdan Mohmed Misbun	21–16, 21–10	(gold) Winner
2010	Scottish International	(Finland) Ville Lang	21–9, 21–10	(gold) Winner
2010	Maldives International	(Sri Lanka) Dinuka Karunaratne	21–14, 21–18	(gold) Winner
2008	Scottish International	(England) Rajiv Ouseph	17–21, 8–21	(silver) Runner-up
2008	Hungarian International	(Denmark) Martin Delfs	22–20, 12–21, 21–12	(gold) Winner
2008	Portugal International	(England) Carl Baxter	21–15, 21–8	(gold) Winner
2008	Austrian International	(Ukraine) Vladislav Druzchenko	21–16, 21–15	(gold) Winner

BWF International Challenge tournament
BWF International Series tournament
