= Airi Bäck =

Finnish badminton player (born 1993)

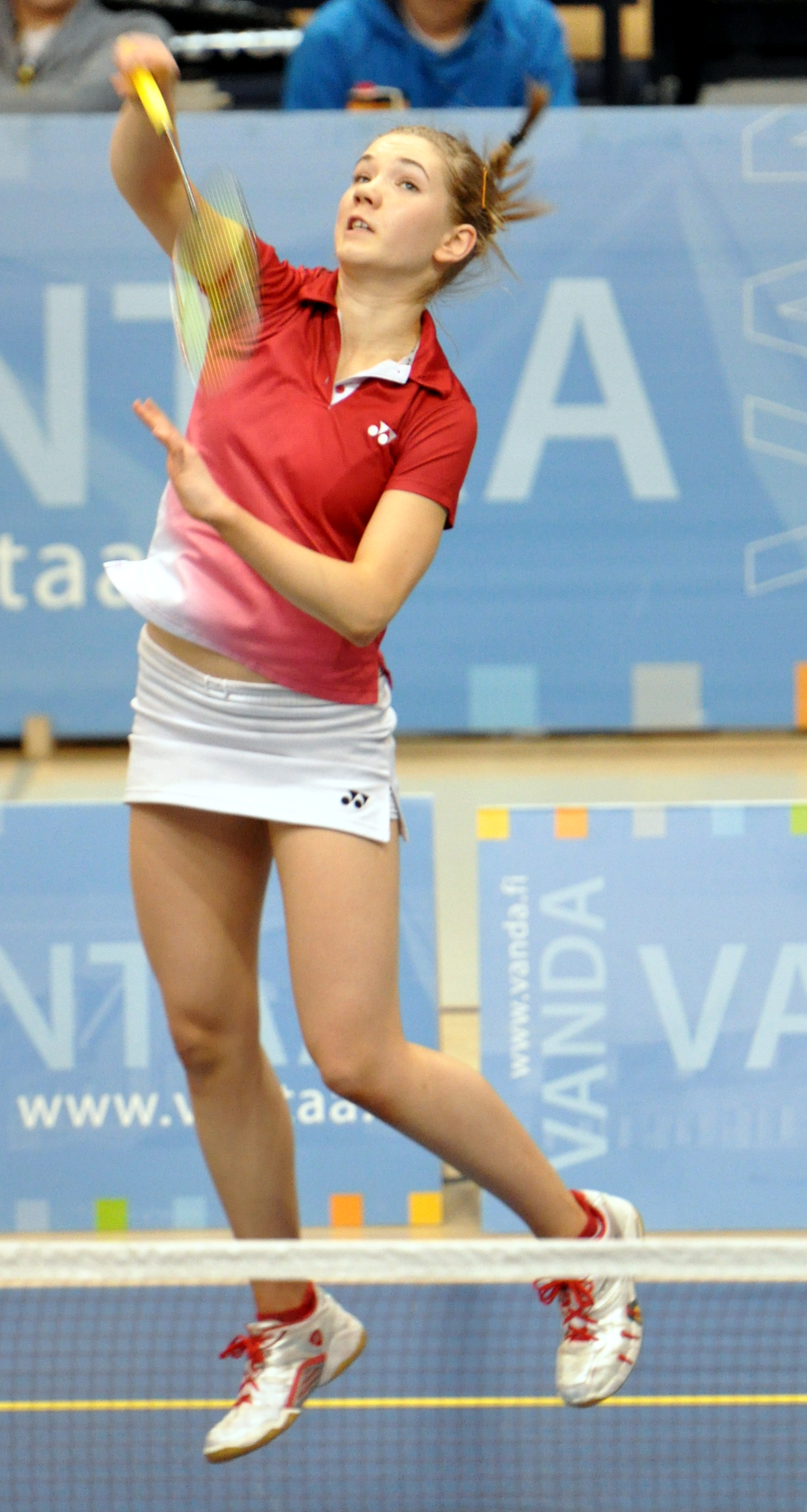

Personal information
- Born: Airi Mikkelä; 5 April 1993 (age 33) Vantaa, Finland
- Height: 1.73 m (5 ft 8 in)

Sport
- Country: Finland
- Sport: Badminton
- Handedness: Right

Women's singles
- Highest ranking: 48 (22 June 2017)
- BWF profile

Airi Bäck (née Mikkelä, born 5 April 1993) is a Finnish retired badminton player. She started playing badminton at 8 years old, then in 2009, she joined Finnish national badminton team. In 2010, she participated at the 2010 Summer Youth Olympics in Singapore. In 2014, she won Iceland International tournament in women's singles event. In 2015, she became the runner-up of Mauritius and Mexico international tournament. In 2016, she won Peru International Series and became the runner-up of Iceland International tournament.

She is married to YouTuber Roni Bäck. Their first child was born in January 2023.

== Achievements ==
=== BWF Grand Prix ===
The BWF Grand Prix had two levels, the Grand Prix and Grand Prix Gold. It was a series of badminton tournaments sanctioned by the Badminton World Federation (BWF) and played between 2007 and 2017.

Women's singles
Year	Tournament	Opponent	Score	Result
2016	Brasil Open	(Spain) Beatriz Corrales	13–21, 11–21	(silver) Runner-up

BWF Grand Prix Gold tournament
BWF Grand Prix tournament

=== BWF International Challenge/Series ===
Women's singles
Year	Tournament	Opponent	Score	Result
2014	Iceland International	(Lithuania) Akvilė Stapušaitytė	21–14, 18–21, 21–11	(gold) Winner
2015	Mauritius International	(Finland) Nanna Vainio	16–21, 11–21	(silver) Runner-up
2015	Internacional Mexicano	(Portugal) Telma Santos	15–21, 19–21	(silver) Runner-up
2016	Iceland International	(Denmark) Julie Dawall Jakobsen	21–19, 15–21, 16–21	(silver) Runner-up
2016	Peru International Series	(Finland) Nanna Vainio	21–13, 21–17	(gold) Winner
2019	Mauritius International	(Myanmar) Thet Htar Thuzar	10–21, 19–21	(silver) Runner-up
2019	Carebaco International	(Wales) Jordan Hart	15–21, 16–21	(silver) Runner-up

Women's doubles
Year	Tournament	Partner	Opponent	Score	Result
2011	Slovenian International	(Finland) Jenny Nyström	(Germany) Johanna Goliszewski (Germany) Carla Nelte	14–21, 18–21	(silver) Runner-up

BWF International Challenge tournament
BWF International Series tournament
BWF Future Series tournament
