= 2016 Brazil Open Grand Prix =

Tournament details
- Dates: 30 August – 4 September 2016
- Level: Grand Prix
- Total prize money: US$55,000
- Venue: Costa Cavalcante
- Location: Foz do Iguaçu, Brazil

Champions
- Men's singles: (Malaysia) Zulfadli Zulkiffli
- Women's singles: (Spain) Beatriz Corrales
- Men's doubles: (Germany) Michael Fuchs (Germany) Fabian Holzer
- Women's doubles: (Germany) Barbara Bellenberg (Germany) Eva Janssens
- Mixed doubles: (India) Pranaav Chopra (India) N. Sikki Reddy

The 2016 Brazil Open Grand Prix was the twelfth Grand Prix's badminton tournament of the 2016 BWF Grand Prix Gold and Grand Prix. The tournament was held at the Costa Cavalcante in Foz do Iguaçu, Brazil on 30 August – 4 September 2016 and had a total purse of $55,000.

== Men's singles ==
=== Seeds ===
1. (Malaysia) Zulfadli Zulkiffli (champion)
2. (Israel) Misha Zilberman (semifinal)
3. (Brazil) Ygor Coelho (semifinal)
4. (India) Anand Pawar (final)

=== Finals ===
Semifinals
1	(Malaysia) Zulfadli Zulkiffli	21	24
3	(Brazil) Ygor Coelho	18	22
4	(India) Anand Pawar	18	21	21
2	(Israel) Misha Zilberman	21	14	12

Final
1	(Malaysia) Zulfadli Zulkiffli	18	21	21
4	(India) Anand Pawar	21	11	17

=== Top half ===
==== Section 1 ====
First round
1	(Malaysia) Z Zulkiffli
BYE
(Brazil) M Cutti	w	/	o
(Peru) J Guevara
(Brazil) A Vasconcellos	21	21
(Brazil) V Alecrim	19	17
(Paraguay) K Asoh	21	21
(Brazil) M Santos	15	8

Second round
1	(Malaysia) Z Zulkiffli	21	21
(Brazil) M Cutti	7	7
(Brazil) A Vasconcellos	21	21
(Paraguay) K Asoh	19	14

Quarterfinals
1	(Malaysia) Z Zulkiffli	21	21
(Brazil) A Vasconcellos	13	7

==== Section 2 ====
First round
3	(Brazil) Y Coelho	21	21
(Brazil) W Guimarães	8	15
(Brazil) A Pomoceno	11	21	11
(Austria) L Wraber	21	18	21
(Trinidad and Tobago) N Bonkowsky	w	/	o
(Brazil) V O Silva
(Brazil) L dos Santos	18	17
(Czech Republic) M Ludík	21	21

Second round
3	(Brazil) Y Coelho	21	21
(Austria) L Wraber	8	16
(Trinidad and Tobago) N Bonkowsky	10	8
(Czech Republic) M Ludík	21	21

Quarterfinals
3	(Brazil) Y Coelho	21	21
(Czech Republic) M Ludík	12	18

=== Bottom half ===
==== Section 3 ====
First round
(Canada) B. R. Sankeerth	21	21
(Brazil) F Cury	15	14
(Brazil) R Salles	w	/	o
(Peru) D Mini
(Austria) V Vattanirappel	21	21
(Brazil) H Arthuso	10	18
(Brazil) M Voigt	6	7
4	(India) A Pawar	21	21

Second round
(Canada) B. R. Sankeerth	21	21
(Brazil) R Salles	17	18
(Austria) V Vattanirappel	8	8
4	(India) A Pawar	21	21

Quarterfinals
(Canada) B. R. Sankeerth	8	10
4	(India) A Pawar	21	21

==== Section 4 ====
First round
(Belgium) M Moreels	21	21
(Brazil) L Gilinski	13	11
(Brazil) R Faria	13	10
(Brazil) F Faria	21	21
(United States) M Fogarty	17	15
(Brazil) I Ibrahim	21	21
(Brazil) V Antunes	5	5
2	(Israel) M Zilberman	21	21

Second round
(Belgium) M Moreels	21	21
(Brazil) F Faria	11	10
(Brazil) I Ibrahim	14	13
2	(Israel) M Zilberman	21	21

Quarterfinals
(Belgium) M Moreels	19	20
2	(Israel) M Zilberman	21	22

== Women's singles ==
=== Seeds ===
1. (Spain) Beatriz Corrales (champion)
2. (Finland) Airi Mikkelä (final)
3. (Brazil) Lohaynny Vicente (withdrew)
4. (Brazil) Fabiana Silva (semifinal)

=== Finals ===
Semifinals
1	(Spain) Beatriz Corrales	21	12	21
(Canada) Rachel Honderich	19	21	12
4	(Brazil) Fabiana Silva	14	21	7
2	(Finland) Airi Mikkelä	21	19	21

Final
1	(Spain) Beatriz Corrales	21	21
2	(Finland) Airi Mikkelä	13	11

=== Top half ===
==== Section 1 ====
First round
1	(Spain) B Corrales
BYE
(Venezuela) D Ortiz
BYE
(Brazil) A P Campos
BYE
(Brazil) P E Da Silva
BYE

Second round
1	(Spain) B Corrales	w	/	o
(Venezuela) D Ortiz
(Brazil) A P Campos
(Brazil) P da Silva	w	/	o

Quarterfinals
1	(Spain) B Corrales	21	21
(Brazil) P da Silva	5	4

==== Section 2 ====
First round
3	(Brazil) L Vicente
BYE
(Brazil) N Vier
BYE
(Brazil) T Salles
BYE
(Canada) R Honderich
BYE

Second round
3	(Brazil) L Vicente
(Brazil) N Vier	w	/	o
(Brazil) T Salles	5	7
(Canada) R Honderich	21	21

Quarterfinals
(Brazil) N Vier	6	4
(Canada) R Honderich	21	21

=== Bottom half ===
==== Section 3 ====
First round
(Peru) D Macias
(Brazil) M Koepsel	w	/	o
BYE
(United States) D Gupta
BYE
(India) S Rane
BYE
4	(Brazil) F Silva

Second round
(Brazil) M Koepsel	w	/	o
(United States) D Gupta
(India) S Rane
4	(Brazil) F Silva	w	/	o

Quarterfinals
(Brazil) M Koepsel	10	11
4	(Brazil) F Silva	21	21

==== Section 4 ====
First round
BYE
(Brazil) M Freitas
BYE
(Brazil) B Lima
BYE
(Brazil) T Correa
BYE
2	(Finland) A Mikkelä

Second round
(Brazil) M Freitas	21	16	21
(Brazil) B Lima	15	21	13
(Brazil) T Correa	5	11
2	(Finland) A Mikkelä	21	21

Quarterfinals
(Brazil) M Freitas	11	8
2	(Finland) A Mikkelä	21	21

== Men's doubles ==
=== Seeds ===
1. (India) Manu Attri / B. Sumeeth Reddy (withdrew)
2. (Belgium) Matijs Dierickx / Freek Golinski (semifinal)
3. (Germany) Jones Ralfy Jansen / Josche Zurwonne (final)
4. (Austria) Vilson Vattanirappel / Luka Wraber (second round)

=== Finals ===
Semifinals

Final

- (Germany) Michael Fuchs
- (Germany) Fabian Holzer
21
21

- (Canada) B. R. Sankeerth
- (Canada) Toby Ng
9
13

- (Germany) Michael Fuchs
- (Germany) Fabian Holzer
21
21

3
- (Germany) Jones Ralfy Jansen
- (Germany) Josche Zurwonne
19
18

3
- (Germany) Jones Ralfy Jansen
- (Germany) Josche Zurwonne
14
21
21

2
- (Belgium) Matijs Dierickx
- (Belgium) Freek Golinski
21
13
11

=== Top half ===
==== Section 1 ====
First round

Second round

Quarterfinals

1
- (India) M Attri
- (India) B S Reddy

BYE

1
- (India) M Attri
- (India) B S Reddy

- (Brazil) F Cury
- (Brazil) L dos Santos
w
/
o

- (Brazil) F Cury
- (Brazil) L dos Santos

BYE

- (Brazil) F Cury
- (Brazil) L dos Santos
14
9

- (Germany) M Fuchs
- (Germany) F Holzer
21
21

- (Brazil) A Pomoceno
- (Brazil) M Voigt

BYE

- (Brazil) A Pomoceno
- (Brazil) M Voigt
6
10

- (Germany) M Fuchs
- (Germany) F Holzer
21
21

- (Germany) M Fuchs
- (Germany) F Holzer

BYE

==== Section 2 ====
First round

Second round

Quarterfinals

4
- (Austria) V Vattanirappel
- (Austria) L Wraber

BYE

4
- (Austria) V Vattanirappel
- (Austria) L Wraber
13
15

- (Canada) B. R. Sankeerth
- (Canada) T Ng
21
21

- (Canada) B. R. Sankeerth
- (Canada) T Ng

BYE

- (Canada) B. R. Sankeerth
- (Canada) T Ng
21
21

- (Brazil) R Salles
- (Brazil) A Vasconcellos
9
11

- (Brazil) R Salles
- (Brazil) A Vasconcellos

BYE

- (Brazil) R Salles
- (Brazil) A Vasconcellos
21
21

- (Brazil) V Antunes
- (Brazil) F Faria
14
11

- (Brazil) V Antunes
- (Brazil) F Faria

BYE

=== Bottom half ===
==== Section 3 ====
First round

Second round

Quarterfinals

- (Peru) J Guevara
- (Peru) D Mini

- (Brazil) V Alecrim
- (Brazil) V O Silva
w
/
o

- (Brazil) V Alecrim
- (Brazil) V O Silva

(Brazil) L Gilinski
(Brazil) M Santos
w
/
o

BYE

(Brazil) L Gilinski
(Brazil) M Santos

(Brazil) L Gilinski
(Brazil) M Santos
5
10

3
- (Germany) J R Jansen
- (Germany) J Zurwonne
21
21

BYE

- (Brazil) R Faria
- (Brazil) W Guimarães

- (Brazil) R Faria
- (Brazil) W Guimarães
9
9

3
- (Germany) J R Jansen
- (Germany) J Zurwonne
21
21

BYE

3
- (Germany) J R Jansen
- (Germany) J Zurwonne

==== Section 4 ====
First round

Second round

Quarterfinals

BYE

- (Trinidad and Tobago) N Bonkowsky
- (United States) M Fogarty

- (Trinidad and Tobago) N Bonkowsky
- (United States) M Fogarty
12
14

- (Brazil) H Arthuso
- (Paraguay) K Asoh
21
21

BYE

- (Brazil) H Arthuso
- (Paraguay) K Asoh

- (Brazil) H Arthuso
- (Paraguay) K Asoh
13
12

2
- (Belgium) M Dierickx
- (Belgium) F Golinski
21
21

BYE

- (Brazil) L Alkimin
- (Brazil) M Cutti

- (Brazil) L Alkimin
- (Brazil) M Cutti
4
12

2
- (Belgium) M Dierickx
- (Belgium) F Golinski
21
21

BYE

2
- (Belgium) M Dierickx
- (Belgium) F Golinski

== Women's doubles ==
=== Seeds ===
1. (Germany) Barbara Bellenberg / Eva Janssens (champion)
2. (Peru) Daniela Macias / Danica Nishimura (withdrew)

=== Finals ===
Semifinals

Final

1
- (Germany) Barbara Bellenberg
- (Germany) Eva Janssens
25
21

- (Brazil) Paula Pereira
- (Brazil) Fabiana Silva
23
11

1
- (Germany) Barbara Bellenberg
- (Germany) Eva Janssens
21
21

- (Brazil) Bianca Lima
- (Brazil) Naira Vier
7
10

- (Brazil) Bianca Lima
- (Brazil) Naira Vier
22
21

- (Brazil) Manoela Koepsel
- (Brazil) Thayse Salles
20
11

=== Draws ===
Quarterfinals

Semifinals

Final

1
- (Germany) B Bellenberg
- (Germany) E Janssens
21
21

- (Brazil) T Correa
- (Brazil) M Freitas
5
8

1
- (Germany) B Bellenberg
- (Germany) E Janssens
25
21

- (Brazil) P Pereira
- (Brazil) F Silva
23
11

- (Brazil) A P Campos
- (Peru) L M Zornoza

- (Brazil) P Pereira
- (Brazil) F Silva
w
/
o

1
- (Germany) B Bellenberg
- (Germany) E Janssens
21
21

- (Brazil) B Lima
- (Brazil) N Vier
7
10

- (Brazil) B Lima
- (Brazil) N Vier
w
/
o

- (Brazil) P da Silva
- (Brazil) L Vicente

- (Brazil) B Lima
- (Brazil) N Vier
22
21

- (Brazil) M Koepsel
- (Brazil) T Salles
20
11

- (Brazil) M Koepsel
- (Brazil) T Salles
w
/
o

2
- (Peru) D Macias
- (Peru) D Nishimura

== Mixed doubles ==
=== Seeds ===
1. (India) Pranaav Jerry Chopra / N. Sikki Reddy (champion)
2. (Canada) Toby Ng / Rachel Honderich (final)
3. (Brazil) Hugo Arthuso / Fabiana Silva (second round)
4. (Peru) Diego Mini / Luz Maria Zornoza (withdrew)

=== Finals ===
Semifinals

Final

1
- (India) Pranav Chopra
- (India) N. Sikki Reddy
21
21

- (Germany) Fabian Holzer
- (Germany) Barbara Bellenberg
18
15

1
- (India) Pranav Chopra
- (India) N. Sikki Reddy
21
21

2
- (Canada) Toby Ng
- (Canada) Rachel Honderich
15
16

- (Germany) Michael Fuchs
- (Germany) Eva Janssens
21
19
17

2
- (Canada) Toby Ng
- (Canada) Rachel Honderich
16
21
21

=== Top half ===
==== Section 1 ====
First round

Second round

Quarterfinals

1
- (India) P Chopra
- (India) N S Reddy

BYE

1
- (India) P Chopra
- (India) N S Reddy
21
21

- (Brazil) I Ibrahim
- (Brazil) N Vier
7
6

- (Brazil) I Ibrahim
- (Brazil) N Vier

BYE

1
- (India) P Chopra
- (India) N S Reddy
21
21

- (Brazil) M Voigt
- (Brazil) B Lima
8
11

- (Brazil) Y Coelho
- (Brazil) L Vicente

BYE

- (Brazil) Y Coelho
- (Brazil) L Vicente

- (Brazil) M Voigt
- (Brazil) B Lima
w
/
o

- (Brazil) M Voigt
- (Brazil) B Lima

BYE

==== Section 2 ====
First round

Second round

Quarterfinals

3
- (Brazil) H Arthuso
- (Brazil) F Silva

BYE

3
- (Brazil) H Arthuso
- (Brazil) F Silva
14
16

- (Germany) F Holzer
- (Germany) B Bellenberg
21
21

- (Germany) F Holzer
- (Germany) B Bellenberg

BYE

- (Germany) F Holzer
- (Germany) B Bellenberg
21
21

- (Brazil) L Gilinski
- (Brazil) M Koepsel
8
6

- (Brazil) L Gilinski
- (Brazil) M Koepsel

BYE

- (Brazil) L Gilinski
- (Brazil) M Koepsel
w
/
o

- (Brazil) L Alkimin
- (Brazil) A P Campos

- (Brazil) L Alkimin
- (Brazil) A P Campos
w
/
o

- (Peru) J Guevara
- (Peru) D Nishimura

=== Bottom half ===
==== Section 3 ====
First round

Second round

Quarterfinals

- (Brazil) L dos Santos
- (Brazil) P Pereira
16
9

- (Germany) M Fuchs
- (Germany) E Janssens
21
21

- (Germany) M Fuchs
- (Germany) E Janssens
21
21

- (Brazil) R Salles
- (Brazil) T Salles
15
12

BYE

- (Brazil) R Salles
- (Brazil) T Salles

- (Germany) M Fuchs
- (Germany) E Janssens
21
21

- (Israel) M Zilberman
- (Israel) S Zilberman
13
13

BYE

- (Israel) M Zilberman
- (Israel) S Zilberman

- (Israel) M Zilberman
- (Israel) S Zilberman
w
/
o

4
- (Peru) D Mini
- (Peru) L M Zornoza

BYE

4
- (Peru) D Mini
- (Peru) L M Zornoza

==== Section 4 ====
First round

Second round

Quarterfinals

- (Brazil) F Cury
- (Brazil) T Correa
w
/
o

- (India) M Attri
- (India) J Gutta

- (Brazil) F Cury
- (Brazil) T Correa
16
15

- (Brazil) A Pomoceno
- (Brazil) M Freitas
21
21

BYE

- (Brazil) A Pomoceno
- (Brazil) M Freitas

- (Brazil) A Pomoceno
- (Brazil) M Freitas
9
6

2
- (Canada) T Ng
- (Canada) R Honderich
21
21

BYE

- (Brazil) A Vasconcellos
- (Brazil) P da Silva

- (Brazil) A Vasconcellos
- (Brazil) P da Silva
12
10

2
- (Canada) T Ng
- (Canada) R Honderich
21
21

BYE

2
- (Canada) T Ng
- (Canada) R Honderich

Preceded by 2016 Vietnam Open Grand Prix	BWF Grand Prix Gold and Grand Prix; 2016 BWF season	Succeeded by 2016 Indonesian Masters Grand Prix Gold
