= Eva Janssens =

German badminton player (born 1996)

Personal information
- Born: Eva Maria Joann Janssens; 16 July 1996 (age 30) Aachen, Germany
- Height: 1.70 m (5 ft 7 in)

Sport
- Country: Germany
- Sport: Badminton
- Handedness: Right

Women's & mixed doubles
- Highest ranking: 50 (WD with Barbara Bellenberg 15 September 2016); 61 (XD with Josche Zurwonne 12 February 2019)
- Current ranking: 88 (WD with Kilasu Ostermeyer); 112 (XD with Jan Colin Völker) (11 May 2021)
- BWF profile
Medal record
Women's badminton
Representing Germany
European Mixed Team Championships
Silver medal – second place	2019 Copenhagen	Mixed team
European Junior Championships
Gold medal – first place	2015 Lubin	Mixed doubles
Bronze medal – third place	2015 Lubin	Girls' doubles

Eva Maria Joann Janssens (born 16 July 1996) is a German badminton player. In 2015, she won gold and bronze medals at the European Junior Badminton Championships in mixed & girls' doubles events.

== Achievements ==
=== European Junior Championships ===
Girls' doubles
Year	Venue	Partner	Opponent	Score	Result
2015	Regional Sport Centrum Hall; Lubin, Poland	(Germany) Yvonne Li	(Denmark) Julie Dawall Jakobsen (Denmark) Ditte Søby Hansen	19–21, 11–21	Bronze

Mixed doubles
Year	Venue	Partner	Opponent	Score	Result
2015	Regional Sport Centrum Hall; Lubin, Poland	(Germany) Max Weißkirchen	(Denmark) Frederik Søgaard (Denmark) Sara Lundgaard	19–21, 21–12, 21–18	Gold

=== BWF Grand Prix (1 title) ===
The BWF Grand Prix had two levels, the Grand Prix and Grand Prix Gold. It was a series of badminton tournaments sanctioned by the Badminton World Federation (BWF) and played between 2007 and 2017.

Women's doubles
Year	Tournament	Partner	Opponent	Score	Result
2016	Brasil Open	(Germany) Barbara Bellenberg	(Brazil) Bianca Lima (Brazil) Naira Vier	21–7, 21–10	(gold) Winner

BWF Grand Prix Gold tournament
BWF Grand Prix tournament

=== BWF International Challenge/Series (4 runners-up) ===
Women's doubles
Year	Tournament	Partner	Opponent	Score	Result
2016	Hellas Open	(Germany) Barbara Bellenberg	(Finland) Jenny Nyström (Finland) Sonja Pekkola	17–21, 16–21	(silver) Runner-up
2018	Slovenian International	(Germany) Stine Susan Küspert	(Turkey) Bengisu Erçetin (Turkey) Nazlıcan İnci	21–23, 19–21	(silver) Runner-up

Mixed doubles
Year	Tournament	Partner	Opponent	Score	Result
2014	Welsh International	(Germany) Max Weißkirchen	(England) Christopher Coles (England) Sophie Brown	21–18, 16–21, 14–21	(silver) Runner-up
2015	Estonian International	(Germany) Max Weißkirchen	(Denmark) Kasper Antonsen (Denmark) Amanda Madsen	17–21, 16–21	(silver) Runner-up

BWF International Challenge tournament
BWF International Series tournament
BWF Future Series tournament
