= Beatriz Corrales =

Spanish badminton player (born 1992)

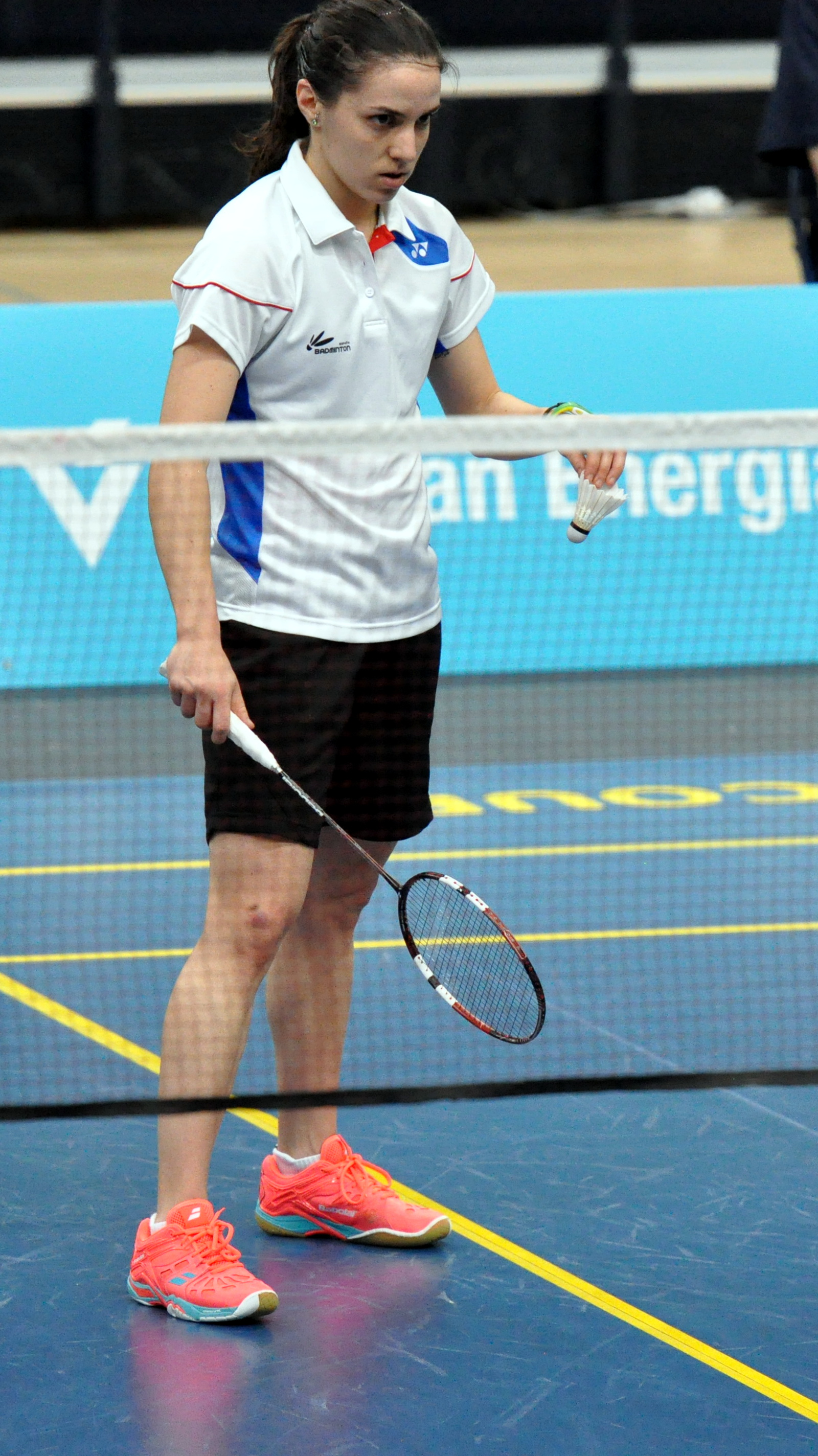

Personal information
- Born: Beatriz Corrales Ocaña; 3 December 1992 (age 33) Leganés, Spain
- Height: 1.64 m (5 ft 5 in)
- Weight: 55 kg (121 lb)

Sport
- Country: Spain
- Sport: Badminton
- Handedness: Right

Women's singles & doubles
- Highest ranking: 20 (WS 27 April 2017); 38 (WD with Clara Azurmendi 24 January 2023)
- BWF profile
Medal record
Women's badminton
Representing Spain
European Women's Team Championships
Silver medal – second place	2024 Łódź	Women's team
Bronze medal – third place	2016 Kazan	Women's team
Bronze medal – third place	2018 Kazan	Women's team
Mediterranean Games
Silver medal – second place	2018 Tarragona	Women's singles
Silver medal – second place	2022 Oran	Women's singles
European Junior Championships
Silver medal – second place	2011 Vantaa	Women's Singles

Beatriz Corrales Ocaña (Spanish pronunciation: [beaˈtɾiθ koˈrales]; born 3 December 1992) is a Spanish badminton player. She was the women's singles bronze medalist at the 2015 European Games, and the silver medalist at the 2018 Mediterranean Games.

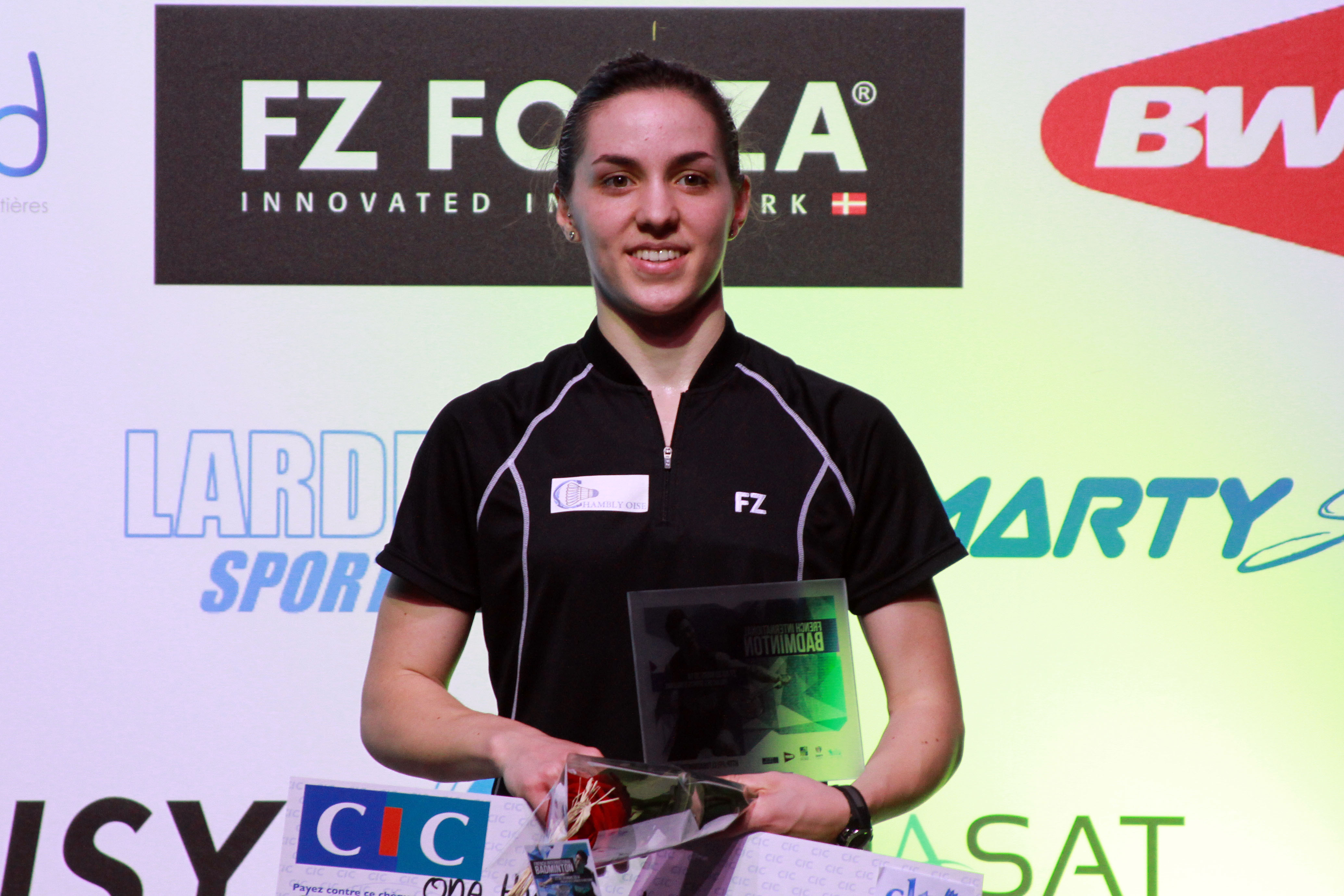
Corrales won the 2014 Orléans International in France

== Achievements ==
=== European Games ===
Women's singles
Year	Venue	Opponent	Score	Result
2015	Baku Sports Hall; Baku, Azerbaijan	(Belgium) Lianne Tan	21–16, 19–21, 13–21	Bronze

=== Mediterranean Games ===
Women's singles
Year	Venue	Opponent	Score	Result	Ref.
2018	El Morell Pavilion; Tarragona, Spain	(Turkey) Neslihan Yiğit	19–21, 21–23	Silver	
2022	Multipurpose Omnisports Hall; Oued Tlélat, Algeria	(Turkey) Neslihan Yiğit	14–21, 11–21	Silver	

=== European Junior Championships ===
Girls' singles
Year	Venue	Opponent	Score	Result
2011	Energia Areena; Vantaa, Finland	(Spain) Carolina Marín	14–21, 21–23	Silver

=== BWF Grand Prix (1 title, 1 runner-up) ===
The BWF Grand Prix had two levels, the Grand Prix and Grand Prix Gold. It was a series of badminton tournaments sanctioned by the Badminton World Federation (BWF) and played between 2007 and 2017.

Women's singles
Year	Tournament	Opponent	Score	Result
2014	Scottish Open	(Japan) Sayaka Sato	18–21, 9–21	(silver) Runner-up
2016	Brasil Open	(Finland) Airi Mikkelä	21–7, 21–10	(gold) Winner

BWF Grand Prix Gold tournament
BWF Grand Prix tournament

=== BWF International Challenge/Series (15 titles, 10 runners-up) ===
Women's singles
Year	Tournament	Opponent	Score	Result
2012	Portugal International	(Bulgaria) Linda Zetchiri	21–15, 21–15	(gold) Winner
2012	Spanish Open	(Thailand) Salakjit Ponsana	11–21, 21–13, 14–21	(silver) Runner-up
2013	Romanian International	(South Korea) Kim Na-young	15–21, 21–6, 21–15	(gold) Winner
2013	French International	(Germany) Olga Konon	21–18, 21–15	(gold) Winner
2013	Finnish Open	(Spain) Carolina Marín	10–21, 15–21	(silver) Runner-up
2013	Dutch International	(Germany) Karin Schnaase	21–16, 21–18	(gold) Winner
2013	Spanish Open	(Spain) Carolina Marín	21–19, 21–18	(gold) Winner
2013	Bulgarian International	(Bulgaria) Petya Nedelcheva	21–19, 21–14	(gold) Winner
2013	Welsh International	(United States) Beiwen Zhang	12–21, 15–21	(silver) Runner-up
2013	Irish Open	(United States) Beiwen Zhang	9–21, 21–17, 10–21	(silver) Runner-up
2014	Orléans International	(France) Sashina Vignes Waran	21–14, 21–13	(gold) Winner
2014	Bulgarian International	(Indonesia) Maria Febe Kusumastuti	23–25, 21–15, 21–12	(gold) Winner
2014	Welsh International	(Bulgaria) Linda Zetchiri	10–21, 21–13, 21–13	(gold) Winner
2014	Irish Open	(Denmark) Line Kjærsfeldt	23–21, 21–13	(gold) Winner
2014	Italian International	(France) Sashina Vignes Waran	21–16, 17–21, 17–21	(silver) Runner-up
2015	Swedish Masters	(Scotland) Kirsty Gilmour	18–21, 19–21	(silver) Runner-up
2015	Finnish Open	(Indonesia) Febby Angguni	21–19, 21–12	(gold) Winner
2015	Spanish International	(United States) Iris Wang	21–13, 14–21, 15–21	(silver) Runner-up
2016	Spanish International	(Japan) Ayumi Mine	17–21, 13–21	(silver) Runner-up
2016	Welsh International	(Chinese Taipei) Sung Shou-yun	21–16, 7–21, 21–19	(gold) Winner
2017	Belgian International	(China) Qi Xuefei	Walkover	(gold) Winner
2021	Mexican International	(Spain) Clara Azurmendi	21–18, 21–17	(gold) Winner

Women's doubles
Year	Tournament	Partner	Opponent	Score	Result
2021	Mexican International	(Spain) Clara Azurmendi	(Spain) Lucía Rodríguez (Spain) Ania Setién	23–21, 12–21, 22–20	(gold) Winner
2022	Future Series Nouvelle-Aquitaine	(Spain) Paula López	(Sweden) Ronak Olyaee (Sweden) Nathalie Wang	21–18, 14–21, 19–21	(silver) Runner-up
2022	Canadian International	(Spain) Clara Azurmendi	(United States) Annie Xu (United States) Kerry Xu	21–15, 15–21, 14–21	(silver) Runner-up

BWF International Challenge tournament
BWF International Series tournament
BWF Future Series tournament
