= Fabian Holzer =

German badminton player (born 1992)

Personal information
- Born: 28 July 1992 (age 34) Dachau, Bavaria, Germany
- Height: 1.80 m (5 ft 11 in)

Sport
- Country: Germany
- Sport: Badminton
- Handedness: Right

Men's & mixed doubles
- Highest ranking: 50 (MD 3 September 2015); 149 (XD 23 October 2014)
- BWF profile
Medal record
Men's badminton
Representing Germany
European Men's Team Championships
Bronze medal – third place	2014 Basel	Men's team
European Junior Championships
Gold medal – first place	2011 Vantaa	Mixed team
Silver medal – second place	2011 Vantaa	Boys' doubles
Bronze medal – third place	2009 Milan	Mixed team

Fabian Holzer (born 28 July 1992) is a German badminton player. In 2011, he won the silver medal in the boys' doubles event at the European Junior Championships partnered with Max Schwenger, and in 2016, he won the men's doubles title at the Brazil Open Grand Prix tournament with Michael Fuchs.

== Achievements ==
=== European Junior Championships ===
Boys' doubles
Year	Venue	Partner	Opponent	Score	Result
2011	Energia Areena; Vantaa, Finland	(Germany) Max Schwenger	(England) Chris Coles (England) Matthew Nottingham	21–15, 14–21, 15–21	Silver

=== BWF Grand Prix ===
The BWF Grand Prix had two levels, the Grand Prix and Grand Prix Gold. It was a series of badminton tournaments sanctioned by the Badminton World Federation (BWF) and played between 2007 and 2017.

Men's doubles
Year	Tournament	Partner	Opponent	Score	Result
2016	Brasil Open	(Germany) Michael Fuchs	(Germany) Jones Ralfy Jansen (Germany) Josche Zurwonne	21–19, 21–18	(gold) Winner

BWF Grand Prix Gold tournament
BWF Grand Prix tournament
