= Barbara Bellenberg =

German badminton player (born 1993)

Personal information
- Born: 19 July 1993 (age 33) Prien am Chiemsee, Germany
- Height: 1.74 m (5 ft 9 in)

Sport
- Country: Germany
- Sport: Badminton
- Handedness: Right

Women's & mixed doubles
- Highest ranking: 50 (WD with Eva Janssens 15 September 2016); 107 (XD with Johannes Pistorius 13 July 2017)
- BWF profile

Barbara Bellenberg (born 19 July 1993) is a German badminton player.

== Achievements ==
=== BWF Grand Prix (1 title) ===
The BWF Grand Prix had two levels, the Grand Prix and Grand Prix Gold. It was a series of badminton tournaments sanctioned by the Badminton World Federation (BWF) and played between 2007 and 2017.

Women's doubles
Year	Tournament	Partner	Opponent	Score	Result
2016	Brasil Open	(Germany) Eva Janssens	(Brazil) Bianca Lima (Brazil) Naira Vier	21–7, 21–10	(gold) Winner

BWF Grand Prix Gold tournament
BWF Grand Prix tournament

=== BWF International Challenge/Series (1 title, 1 runner-up) ===
Women's doubles
Year	Tournament	Partner	Opponent	Score	Result
2014	Romanian International	(Germany) Ramona Hacks	(Germany) Kira Kattenbeck (Germany) Franziska Volkmann	21–15, 21–13	(gold) Winner
2016	Hellas Open	(Germany) Eva Janssens	(Finland) Jenny Nyström (Finland) Sonja Pekkola	17–21, 16–21	(silver) Runner-up

BWF International Challenge tournament
BWF International Series tournament
BWF Future Series tournament
