= Josche Zurwonne =

German badminton player (born 1989)

Personal information
- Born: 23 March 1989 (age 37) Münster, Germany
- Height: 1.83 m (6 ft 0 in)

Sport
- Country: Germany
- Sport: Badminton
- Handedness: Right

Men's & mixed doubles
- Highest ranking: 22 (MD 28 June 2018); 60 (MD 19 February 2019)
- Current ranking: 54 (MD), 121 (XD) (23 April 2019)
- BWF profile
Medal record
Men's badminton
Representing Germany
European Mixed Team Championships
| Silver medal – second place | 2011 Amsterdam | Mixed team |
| Bronze medal – third place | 2017 Lubin | Mixed team |
| Bronze medal – third place | 2015 Leuven | Mixed team |
European Men's Team Championships
| Silver medal – second place | 2012 Amsterdam | Men's team |
| Bronze medal – third place | 2018 Kazan | Men's team |
| Bronze medal – third place | 2016 Kazan | Men's team |
| Bronze medal – third place | 2014 Basel | Men's team |

Josche Zurwonne (born 23 March 1989) is a German badminton player. He started playing badminton at age 8, and joined the Germany national badminton team in 2008.

== Achievements ==
=== BWF Grand Prix ===
The BWF Grand Prix has two levels, the Grand Prix and Grand Prix Gold. It is a series of badminton tournaments sanctioned by the Badminton World Federation (BWF) since 2007.

Men's doubles
| Year | Tournament | Partner | Opponent | Score | Result |
|---|---|---|---|---|---|
| 2016 | Brasil Open | (Germany) Jones Ralfy Jansen | (Germany) Michael Fuchs (Germany) Fabian Holzer | 19–21, 18–21 | (silver) Runner-up |
| 2014 | Brasil Open | (Germany) Max Schwenger | (Germany) Raphael Beck (Germany) Andreas Heinz | 11–9, 11–6, 11–4 | (gold) Winner |

BWF Grand Prix Gold tournament
BWF Grand Prix tournament

=== BWF International Challenge/Series ===
Men's doubles
| Year | Tournament | Partner | Opponent | Score | Result |
|---|---|---|---|---|---|
| 2016 | Italian International | (Germany) Jones Ralfy Jansen | (Sweden) Richard Eidestedt (Sweden) Nico Ruponen | 21–17, 21-18 | (gold) Winner |
| 2016 | Irish Open | (Germany) Jones Ralfy Jansen | (Chinese Taipei) Liao Min-chun (Chinese Taipei) Su Cheng-heng | 27–25, 23–21 | (gold) Winner |
| 2016 | White Nights | (Germany) Jones Ralfy Jansen | (France) Bastian Kersaudy (France) Julien Maio | 21–15, 21–14 | (gold) Winner |
| 2016 | Estonian International | (Germany) Jones Ralfy Jansen | (Scotland) Martin Campbell (Scotland) Patrick Machugh | 21–15, 21–18 | (gold) Winner |
| 2014 | Irish Open | (Germany) Max Schwenger | (Poland) Adam Cwalina (Poland) Przemysław Wacha | 21-12, 10-21, 18-21 | (silver) Runner-up |
| 2012 | Irish Open | (Germany) Johannes Schoettler | (Netherlands) Jacco Arends (Netherlands) Jelle Maas | 14–21, 19–21 | (silver) Runner-up |
| 2012 | French International | (Germany) Peter Käsbauer | (Germany) Andreas Heinz (Germany) Max Schwenger | 26–24, 17–21, 21–11 | (gold) Winner |
| 2011 | Spanish Open | (Germany) Peter Käsbauer | (Poland) Adam Cwalina (Poland) Michał Łogosz | 14–21, 11–21 | (silver) Runner-up |
| 2011 | Dutch International | (Germany) Peter Käsbauer | (France) Baptiste Careme (France) Sylvain Grosjean | 11–21, 21–19, 17–21 | (silver) Runner-up |
| 2011 | Estonian International | (Germany) Peter Käsbauer | (France) Lucas Corvee (France) Joris Grosjean | 21–8, 21–18 | (gold) Winner |
| 2010 | Welsh International | (Germany) Peter Käsbauer | (England) Mark Middleton (England) Ben Stawski | 21–19, 21–12 | (gold) Winner |
| 2010 | Hungarian International | (Germany) Peter Käsbauer | (Germany) Maurice Niesner (Germany) Till Zander | 21–17, 22–20 | (gold) Winner |

BWF International Challenge tournament
BWF International Series tournament
BWF Future Series tournament
