= Brasil Open (badminton) =

Tournament details
- Total prize money: US$50,000
- Location: Rio de Janeiro (2014–2015); Foz do Iguacu (2016)

The Brasil Open is an international badminton tournament held annually in Brazil. A part of the BWF Grand Prix tournaments, it is one of the main events in the Brazilian badminton calendar. The first tournament was held on 5–8 August 2014 in Rio de Janeiro and offered a total prize money of US$50,000.

== Past winners ==
Year	Men's singles	Women's singles	Men's doubles	Women's doubles	Mixed doubles
2014	(Republic of Ireland) Scott Evans	(United States) Beiwen Zhang	(Germany) Max Schwenger (Germany) Josche Zurwonne	(Germany) Johanna Goliszewski (Germany) Carla Nelte	(Germany) Max Schwenger (Germany) Carla Nelte
2015	(China) Lin Dan	(China) Shen Yaying	(China) Huang Kaixiang (China) Zheng Siwei	(China) Chen Qingchen (China) Jia Yifan	(China) Zheng Siwei (China) Chen Qingchen
2016	(Malaysia) Zulfadli Zulkiffli	(Spain) Beatriz Corrales	(Germany) Michael Fuchs (Germany) Fabian Holzer	(Germany) Barbara Bellenberg (Germany) Eva Janssens	(India) Pranaav Chopra (India) N. Sikki Reddy
