= 2015 European Junior Badminton Championships – Teams event =

2015 European Junior Badminton Championships – Mixed team
- Venue: RCS Arena
- Location: Lubin, Poland
- Dates: 26 March 2015 – 30 March 2015
- Nations: 34

Medalists
gold medal	Spain
silver medal	England
bronze medal	Denmark
bronze medal	France

The mixed team tournament of the 2015 European Junior Badminton Championships was held from 26 to 30 March 2015.

== Tournament ==
=== Venue ===
This tournament was held at the RCS Arena in Lubin, Poland.

=== Draw ===
Group 1	Group 2	Group 3	Group 4
Armenia; Denmark; Latvia; Portugal	Austria; Croatia; England; Sweden	Germany; Iceland; Lithuania; Poland	Bulgaria; France; Scotland; Slovenia
Group 5	Group 6	Group 7	Group 8
Czech Republic; Italy; Turkey; Ukraine	Belgium; Hungary; Russia; Slovakia	Cyprus; Ireland; Norway; Romania; Spain	Estonia; Finland; Greece; Netherlands; Switzerland

== Group stage ==
=== Group 1 ===
Pos	Team	Pld	W	L	MF	MA	MD	GF	GA	GD	PF	PA	PD	Pts	Qualification	Denmark	Portugal	Latvia	Armenia
1	Denmark	3	3	0	15	0	+15	30	0	+30	630	257	+373	3	Advance to knockout stage	—	5–0	5–0	5–0
2	Portugal	3	2	1	6	9	−3	13	18	−5	492	487	+5	2			—	3–2	3–2
3	Latvia	3	1	2	6	9	−3	12	18	−6	403	516	−113	1				—	4–1
4	Armenia	3	0	3	3	12	−9	6	25	−19	343	608	−265	0					—

Source: BWF

==== Denmark vs Armenia ====
Denmark
5
RCS Arena, Court 1
26 March 2015, 10:00 UTC+2

Armenia
0

			1	2	3
1	(Denmark) (Armenia)	Mathias Bay-Smidt / Marie Louise Steffensen; Vardan Kirakosyan / Knarik Margaryan	21; 4	21; 3
2	(Denmark) (Armenia)	Rasmus Gemke; Zaven Mnatsakanyan	21; 4	21; 13
3	(Denmark) (Armenia)	Irina Amalie Andersen; Lilit Poghosyan	21; 16	21; 16
4	(Denmark) (Armenia)	Joel Eipe / Frederik Søgaard; Vardan Kirakosyan / Zaven Mnatsakanyan	21; 2	21; 3
5	(Denmark) (Armenia)	Julie Dawall Jakobsen / Ditte Søby; Knarik Margaryan / Lilit Poghosyan	21; 9	21; 12

==== Latvia vs Portugal ====
Latvia
2
RCS Arena, Court 2
26 March 2015, 10:00 UTC+2

Portugal
3

			1	2	3
1	(Latvia) (Portugal)	Kristaps Kalniņš / Liāna Lenceviča; Ricardo Silva / Daniela Conceição	12; 21	9; 21
2	(Latvia) (Portugal)	Niks Podosinoviks; Bernardo Atilano	7; 21	7; 21
3	(Latvia) (Portugal)	Jekaterina Romanova; Gabriela Pereira	21; 7	21; 10
4	(Latvia) (Portugal)	Kristaps Gulbis / Teodors Kerimovs; Angelo Silva / Ricardo Silva	14; 21	11; 21
5	(Latvia) (Portugal)	Liāna Lenceviča / Jekaterina Romanova; Daniela Conceicao / Joana Lopes	21; 18	21; 17

==== Denmark vs Latvia ====
Denmark
5
RCS Arena, Court 3
27 March 2015, 12:30 UTC+2

Latvia
0

			1	2	3
1	(Denmark) (Latvia)	Anders Antonsen; Niks Podosinoviks	21; 7	21; 6
2	(Denmark) (Latvia)	Mia Blichfeldt; Liāna Lenceviča	21; 7	21; 7
3	(Denmark) (Latvia)	Alexander Bond / Joel Eipe; Kristaps Gulbis / Kristaps Kalniņš	21; 12	21; 6
4	(Denmark) (Latvia)	Julie Dawall Jakobsen / Ditte Søby; Liāna Lenceviča / Olga Mihailova	21; 4	21; 7
5	(Denmark) (Latvia)	Frederik Søgaard / Sara Lundgaard; Teodors Kerimovs / Jekaterina Romanova	21; 10	21; 8

==== Armenia vs Portugal ====
Armenia
2
RCS Arena, Court 4
27 March 2015, 12:30 UTC+2

Portugal
3

			1	2	3
1	(Armenia) (Portugal)	Vardan Kirakosyan / Knarik Margaryan; Ricardo Silva / Daniela Conceição	7; 21	6; 21
2	(Armenia) (Portugal)	Zaven Mnatsakanyan; Duarte Nuno Anjo	6; 21	7; 21
3	(Armenia) (Portugal)	Lilit Poghosyan; Gabriela Pereira	21; 17	21; 17
4	(Armenia) (Portugal)	Vardan Kirakosyan / Zaven Mnatsakanyan; Duarte Nuno Anjo / Bernardo Atilano	6; 21	4; 21
5	(Armenia) (Portugal)	Knarik Margaryan / Lilit Poghosyan; Daniela Conceição / Joana Lopes	21; 15	13; 21	21; 17

==== Denmark vs Portugal ====
Denmark
5
RCS Arena, Court 5
28 March 2015, 10:00 UTC+2

Portugal
0

			1	2	3
1	(Denmark) (Portugal)	Ditlev Jæger Holm; Angelo Silva	21; 12	21; 16
2	(Denmark) (Portugal)	Julie Dawall Jakobsen; Ana Dias	21; 8	21; 9
3	(Denmark) (Portugal)	Joel Eipe / Frederik Søgaard; Duarte Nuno Anjo / Bernardo Atilano	21; 12	21; 5
4	(Denmark) (Portugal)	Sara Lundgaard / Marie Louise Steffensen; Ana Dias / Gabriela Pereira	21; 6	21; 12
5	(Denmark) (Portugal)	Alexander Bond / Ditte Søby; Ricardo Silva / Daniela Conceição	21; 12	21; 9

==== Armenia vs Latvia ====
Armenia
1
RCS Arena, Court 6
28 March 2015, 10:00 UTC+2

Latvia
4

			1	2	3
1	(Armenia) (Latvia)	Vardan Kirakosyan / Knarik Margaryan; Teodors Kerimovs / Jekaterina Romanova	12; 21	7; 21
2	(Armenia) (Latvia)	Zaven Mnatsakanyan; Niks Podosinoviks	12; 21	3; 21
3	(Armenia) (Latvia)	Lilit Poghosyan; Olga Mihailova	21; 6	21; 11
4	(Armenia) (Latvia)	Vardan Kirakosyan / Zaven Mnatsakanyan; Kristaps Gulbis / Kristaps Kalniņš	11; 21	7; 21
5	(Armenia) (Latvia)	Knarik Margaryan / Lilit Poghosyan; Liāna Lenceviča / Jekaterina Romanova	18; 21	16; 21

=== Group 2 ===
Pos	Team	Pld	W	L	MF	MA	MD	GF	GA	GD	PF	PA	PD	Pts	Qualification	England	Sweden	Austria	Croatia
1	England	3	3	0	12	3	+9	26	7	+19	663	501	+162	3	Advance to knockout stage	—	3–2	5–0	4–1
2	Sweden	3	2	1	11	4	+7	22	12	+10	649	559	+90	2			—	5–0	4–1
3	Austria	3	1	2	3	12	−9	8	25	−17	495	665	−170	1				—	3–2
4	Croatia	3	0	3	4	11	−7	11	23	−12	548	630	−82	0					—

Source: BWF

==== Croatia vs Sweden ====
Croatia
1
RCS Arena, Court 2
26 March 2015, 14:00 UTC+2

Sweden
4

			1	2	3
1	(Croatia) (Sweden)	Fran Galjer / Katarina Galenić; Morgan Lidman / Moa Sjöö	15; 21	7; 21
2	(Croatia) (Sweden)	Maja Pavlinić; Elin Svensson	21; 17	21; 7
3	(Croatia) (Sweden)	Fran Galjer; Andy Tsai	14; 21	11; 21
4	(Croatia) (Sweden)	Katarina Galenić / Maja Pavlinić; Clara Nistad / Moa Sjöö	16; 21	21; 15	16; 21
5	(Croatia) (Sweden)	Dominik Doko / Filip Jagar; Morgan Lidman / Andy Tsai	14; 21	14; 21

==== England vs Austria ====
England
5
RCS Arena, Court 6
26 March 2015, 14:00 UTC+2

Austria
0

			1	2	3
1	(England) (Austria)	James Farmer; Leon Seiwald	21; 19	21; 17
2	(England) (Austria)	Ira Banerjee; Natalie Herbst	21; 9	21; 16
3	(England) (Austria)	Matthew Clare / Sean Vendy; Philip Birker / Christoph Muhri	21; 10	21; 9
4	(England) (Austria)	Jessica Hopton / Lydia Jane Powell; Natalie Herbst / Janine Lais	21; 16	21; 17
5	(England) (Austria)	Ben Lane / Jessica Pugh; Philip Birker / Nina Sorger	21; 13	21; 10

==== England vs Croatia ====
England
4
RCS Arena, Court 2
27 March 2015, 19:30 UTC+2

Croatia
1

			1	2	3
1	(England) (Croatia)	Ben Lane / Jessica Pugh; Fran Galjer / Katarina Galenić	21; 13	21; 9
2	(England) (Croatia)	Sean Vendy; Borna Drvodelić	21; 7	21; 8
3	(England) (Croatia)	Ira Banerjee; Dorotea Sutara	21; 13	12; 21	27; 25
4	(England) (Croatia)	Matthew Clare / Ben Lane; Dominik Doko / Filip Jagar	21; 7	21; 10
5	(England) (Croatia)	Jessica Hopton / Lydia Jane Powell; Katarina Galenić / Maja Pavlinić	19; 21	21; 19	14; 21

==== Austria vs Sweden ====
Austria
0
RCS Arena, Court 4
27 March 2015, 19:30 UTC+2

Sweden
5

			1	2	3
1	(Austria) (Sweden)	Janine Lais; Clara Nistad	15; 21	3; 21
2	(Austria) (Sweden)	Leon Seiwald; Andy Tsai	21; 19	12; 21	13; 21
3	(Austria) (Sweden)	Natalie Herbst / Nina Sorger; Clara Nistad / Moa Sjöö	15; 21	8; 21
4	(Austria) (Sweden)	Philip Birker / Christoph Muhri; Oliver Hjälm / Thai To	19; 21	22; 20	21; 23
5	(Austria) (Sweden)	Leon Seiwald / Janine Lais; Morgan Lidman / Moa Sjöö	11; 21	16; 21

==== Austria vs Croatia ====
Austria
3
RCS Arena, Court 2
28 March 2015, 18:00 UTC+2

Croatia
2

			1	2	3
1	(Austria) (Croatia)	Leon Seiwald; Fran Galjer	21; 14	21; 16
2	(Austria) (Croatia)	Natalie Herbst; Katarina Galenić	7; 21	12; 21
3	(Austria) (Croatia)	Philip Birker / Christoph Muhri; Borna Drvodelić / Fran Galjer	19; 21	21; 19	21; 17
4	(Austria) (Croatia)	Natalie Herbst / Nina Sorger; Dora Drvodelić / Dorotea Sutara	7; 21	12; 21
5	(Austria) (Croatia)	Janine Lais / Leon Seiwald; Dominik Doko / Maja Pavlinić	21; 16	21; 17

==== England vs Sweden ====
England
3
RCS Arena, Court 4
28 March 2015, 18:00 UTC+2

Sweden
2

			1	2	3
1	(England) (Sweden)	Sean Vendy; Morgan Lidman	21; 19	21; 14
2	(England) (Sweden)	Lydia Jane Powell; Elin Svensson	13; 21	13; 21
3	(England) (Sweden)	Ben Lane / Sean Vendy; Morgan Lidman / Andy Tsai	21; 16	21; 12
4	(England) (Sweden)	Jessica Hopton / Lydia Jane Powell; Clara Nistad / Moa Sjöö	22; 20	18; 21	21; 23
5	(England) (Sweden)	Ben Lane / Jessica Pugh; Thai To / Klara Johansson	21; 13	21; 11

=== Group 3 ===
Pos	Team	Pld	W	L	MF	MA	MD	GF	GA	GD	PF	PA	PD	Pts	Qualification	Germany	Poland	Lithuania	Iceland
1	Germany	3	3	0	15	0	+15	30	1	+29	653	389	+264	3	Advance to knockout stage	—	5–0	5–0	5–0
2	Poland (H)	3	2	1	9	6	+3	19	12	+7	568	509	+59	2			—	4–1	5–0
3	Lithuania	3	1	2	5	10	−5	10	20	−10	458	580	−122	1				—	4–1
4	Iceland	3	0	3	1	14	−13	2	28	−26	415	616	−201	0					—

Source: BWF
(H) Host

==== Poland vs Lithuania ====
Poland
4
RCS Arena, Court 1
26 March 2015, 14:00 UTC+2

Lithuania
1

			1	2	3
1	(Poland) (Lithuania)	Joanna Rudna; Vytautė Fomkinaitė	21; 17	21; 10
2	(Poland) (Lithuania)	Krzysztof Jakowczuk; Laurynas Sparnauskis	19; 21	19; 21
3	(Poland) (Lithuania)	Wiktoria Dąbczyńska / Aleksandra Goszczyńska; Rebeka Aleksevičiūtė / Gabija Narvilaitė	21; 17	21; 15
4	(Poland) (Lithuania)	Mateusz Biernacki / Przemysław Szydłowski; Renaldas Šileris / Laurynas Sparnauskis	21; 17	21; 17
5	(Poland) (Lithuania)	Paweł Śmiłowski / Magdalena Świerczyńska; Karolis Eimutaitis / Gabija Narvilaitė	21; 12	21; 10

==== Germany vs Iceland ====
Germany
5
RCS Arena, Court 4
26 March 2015, 14:00 UTC+2

Iceland
0

			1	2	3
1	(Germany) (Iceland)	Max Weißkirchen; Pálmi Guðfinnsson	21; 15	21; 9
2	(Germany) (Iceland)	Luise Heim; Harpa Hilmisdottir	21; 10	21; 13
3	(Germany) (Iceland)	Bjarne Geiss / Daniel Seifert; Davíð Bjarni Björnsson / Kristófer Darri Finnsson	21; 8	21; 18
4	(Germany) (Iceland)	Yvonne Li / Annika Schreiber; Harpa Hilmisdottir / Arna Karen Jóhannsdóttir	21; 10	21; 10
5	(Germany) (Iceland)	Bjarne Geiss / Eva Janssens; Daníel Jóhannesson / Sigríður Árnadóttir	24; 22	21; 14

==== Iceland vs Poland ====
Iceland
0
RCS Arena, Court 1
27 March 2015, 09:00 UTC+2

Poland
5

			1	2	3
1	(Iceland) (Poland)	Kristófer Darri Finnsson; Krzysztof Jakowczuk	17; 21	13; 21
2	(Iceland) (Poland)	Sigríður Árnadóttir; Joanna Rudna	4; 21	10; 15		retired
3	(Iceland) (Poland)	Pálmi Guðfinnsson / Daníel Jóhannesson; Aleksander Jabłoński / Paweł Śmiłowski	15; 21	18; 21
4	(Iceland) (Poland)	Arna Karen Jóhannsdóttir / Alda Karen Jónsdóttir; Magda Konieczna / Kornelia Marczak	6; 21	12; 21
5	(Iceland) (Poland)	Daníel Jóhannesson / Arna Karen Jóhannsdóttir; Przemysław Szydłowski / Magdalena Świerczyńska	16; 21	11; 21

==== Germany vs Lithuania ====
Germany
5
RCS Arena, Court 4
27 March 2015, 09:00 UTC+2

Lithuania
0

			1	2	3
1	(Germany) (Lithuania)	Max Weißkirchen; Mantas Šatrauskas	21; 16	21; 4
2	(Germany) (Lithuania)	Yvonne Li; Vytautė Fomkinaitė	21; 8	21; 8
3	(Germany) (Lithuania)	Bjarne Geiss / Jan Colin Völker; Renaldas Šileris / Laurynas Sparnauskis	21; 9	21; 11
4	(Germany) (Lithuania)	Luise Heim / Judith Petrikowski; Rebeka Aleksevičiūtė / Gabija Narvilaitė	21; 11	21; 11
5	(Germany) (Lithuania)	Daniel Seifert / Eva Janssens; Renaldas Sileris / Gabriele Janusonyte	21; 7	21; 17

==== Germany vs Poland ====
Germany
5
RCS Arena, Court 1
28 March 2015, 18:00 UTC+2

Poland
0

			1	2	3
1	(Germany) (Poland)	Max Weißkirchen / Eva Janssens; Paweł Śmiłowski / Magdalena Świerczyńska	21; 16	21; 8
2	(Germany) (Poland)	David Peng; Krzysztof Jakowczuk	21; 4	23; 21
3	(Germany) (Poland)	Luise Heim; Joanna Rudna	18; 21	21; 16	21; 10
4	(Germany) (Poland)	Bjarne Geiss / Daniel Seifert; Aleksander Jabłoński / Paweł Śmiłowski	21; 17	21; 19
5	(Germany) (Poland)	Eva Janssens / Yvonne Li; Magda Konieczna / Kornelia Marczak	21; 11	21; 15

==== Iceland vs Lithuania ====
Iceland
1
RCS Arena, Court 5
28 March 2015, 18:00 UTC+2

Lithuania
4

			1	2	3
1	(Iceland) (Lithuania)	Harpa Hilmisdottir; Vytautė Fomkinaitė	14; 21	11; 21
2	(Iceland) (Lithuania)	Daníel Jóhannesson; Laurynas Sparnauskis	21; 14	21; 16
3	(Iceland) (Lithuania)	Arna Karen Jóhannsdóttir / Alda Karen Jónsdóttir; Rebeka Aleksevičiūtė / Gabija Narvilaitė	18; 21	10; 21
4	(Iceland) (Lithuania)	Kristófer Darri Finnsson / Pálmi Guðfinnsson; Renaldas Šileris / Laurynas Sparnauskis	20; 22	19; 21
5	(Iceland) (Lithuania)	Davíð Bjarni Björnsson / Alda Karen Jónsdóttir; Karolis Eimutaitis / Gabija Narvilaitė	13; 21	17; 21

=== Group 4 ===
Pos	Team	Pld	W	L	MF	MA	MD	GF	GA	GD	PF	PA	PD	Pts	Qualification	France	Scotland	Slovenia	Bulgaria
1	France	3	3	0	14	1	+13	29	3	+26	650	462	+188	3	Advance to knockout stage	—	4–1	5–0	5–0
2	Scotland	3	2	1	10	5	+5	20	15	+5	647	623	+24	2			—	4–1	5–0
3	Slovenia	3	1	2	4	11	−7	10	24	−14	563	660	−97	1				—	3–2
4	Bulgaria	3	0	3	2	13	−11	9	26	−17	558	673	−115	0					—

Source: BWF

==== France vs Slovenia ====
France
5
RCS Arena, Court 3
26 March 2015, 14:00 UTC+2

Slovenia
0

			1	2	3
1	(France) (Slovenia)	Lole Courtois; Lia Šalehar	21; 13	21; 9
2	(France) (Slovenia)	Vincent Medina; Miha Ivanič	21; 13	21; 7
3	(France) (Slovenia)	Verlaine Faulmann / Anne Tran; Katarina Beton / Ema Cizelj	21; 15	21; 18
4	(France) (Slovenia)	Toma Junior Popov / Thomas Vallez; Miha Ivanič / Andraž Krapež	21; 18	21; 15
5	(France) (Slovenia)	Alexandre Hammer / Anne Tran; Martin Cerkovnik / Nika Arih	21; 15	21; 15

==== Scotland vs Bulgaria ====
Scotland
5
RCS Arena, Court 5
26 March 2015, 14:00 UTC+2

Bulgaria
0

			1	2	3
1	(Scotland) (Bulgaria)	Adam Hall / Julie MacPherson; Vladimir Shishkov / Mariya Mitsova	21; 14	21; 15
2	(Scotland) (Bulgaria)	Alexander Dunn; Dimitar Yanakiev	21; 19	19; 21	21; 18
3	(Scotland) (Bulgaria)	Holly Newall; Maria Delcheva	17; 21	21; 12	21; 16
4	(Scotland) (Bulgaria)	Alexander Dunn / Adam Hall; Daniel Nikolov / Ivan Panev	21; 14	21; 18
5	(Scotland) (Bulgaria)	Julie MacPherson / Holly Newall; Mihaela Neycheva / Lilia Stoyanova	21; 11	21; 6

==== France vs Bulgaria ====
France
5
RCS Arena, Court 1
27 March 2015, 12:30 UTC+2

Bulgaria
0

			1	2	3
1	(France) (Bulgaria)	Thomas Vallez / Anne Tran; Danail Balkanski / Anna-Maria Tsaneva	21; 11	21; 9
2	(France) (Bulgaria)	Vincent Medina; Vladimir Shishkov	21; 18	22; 20
3	(France) (Bulgaria)	Lole Courtois; Mariya Mitsova	21; 17	13; 21	21; 16
4	(France) (Bulgaria)	Toma Junior Popov / Thomas Vallez; Daniel Nikolov / Vladimir Shishkov	21; 17	21; 14
5	(France) (Bulgaria)	Joanna Chaube / Anne Tran; Maria Delcheva / Mihaela Neycheva	21; 10	21; 4

==== Scotland vs Slovenia ====
Scotland
4
RCS Arena, Court 2
27 March 2015, 12:30 UTC+2

Slovenia
1

			1	2	3
1	(Scotland) (Slovenia)	Adam Hall / Eleanor O'Donnell; Miha Ivanič / Lia Šalehar	24; 22	21; 19
2	(Scotland) (Slovenia)	Alexander Dunn; Martin Cerkovnik	20; 22	8; 21
3	(Scotland) (Slovenia)	Holly Newall; Nika Arih	21; 14	15; 21	21; 18
4	(Scotland) (Slovenia)	Alexander Dunn / Adam Hall; Miha Ivanič / Andraz Krapez	20; 22	21; 15	21; 10
5	(Scotland) (Slovenia)	Julie MacPherson / Eleanor O'Donnell; Katarina Beton / Ema Cizelj	21; 19	21; 19

==== France vs Scotland ====
France
4
RCS Arena, Court 3
28 March 2015, 10:00 UTC+2

Scotland
1

			1	2	3
1	(France) (Scotland)	Thomas Vallez / Anne Tran; Adam Hall / Julie MacPherson	21; 13	21; 12
2	(France) (Scotland)	Vincent Medina; Alexander Dunn	21; 10	21; 7
3	(France) (Scotland)	Lole Courtois; Holly Newall	21; 17	21; 13
4	(France) (Scotland)	Toma Junior Popov / Thomas Vallez; Alexander Dunn / Adam Hall	21; 16	14; 21	10; 21
5	(France) (Scotland)	Joanna Chaube / Anne Tran; Julie MacPherson / Eleanor O'Donnell	24; 22	21; 15

==== Bulgaria vs Slovenia ====
Bulgaria
2
RCS Arena, Court 4
28 March 2015, 10:00 UTC+2

Slovenia
3

			1	2	3
1	(Bulgaria) (Slovenia)	Daniel Nikolov; Miha Ivanič	21; 12	24; 26	10; 21
2	(Bulgaria) (Slovenia)	Mariya Mitsova; Lia Šalehar	21; 11	21; 4
3	(Bulgaria) (Slovenia)	Daniel Nikolov / Vladimir Shishkov; Miha Ivanič / Andraž Krapež	21; 17	21; 14
4	(Bulgaria) (Slovenia)	Maria Delcheva / Anna-Maria Tsaneva; Katarina Beton / Ema Cizelj	15; 21	8; 21
5	(Bulgaria) (Slovenia)	Danail Balkanski / Mariya Mitsova; Martin Cerkovnik / Nika Arih	21; 14	15; 21	18; 21

=== Group 5 ===
Pos	Team	Pld	W	L	MF	MA	MD	GF	GA	GD	PF	PA	PD	Pts	Qualification	Turkey	Czech Republic	Ukraine	Italy
1	Turkey	3	3	0	15	0	+15	30	2	+28	673	404	+269	3	Advance to knockout stage	—	5–0	5–0	5–0
2	Czech Republic	3	2	1	7	8	−1	16	18	−2	600	611	−11	2			—	3–2	4–1
3	Ukraine	3	1	2	7	8	−1	16	18	−2	557	628	−71	1				—	5–0
4	Italy	3	0	3	1	14	−13	5	29	−24	505	692	−187	0					—

Source: BWF

==== Czech Republic vs Ukraine ====
Czech Republic
3
RCS Arena, Court 1
26 March 2015, 18:00 UTC+2

Ukraine
2

			1	2	3
1	(Czech Republic) (Ukraine)	Michal Hubáček / Monika Švetnicková; Ruslan Sarsekenov / Anna Mikhalkova	21; 14	21; 11
2	(Czech Republic) (Ukraine)	Tereza Švábíková; Vladyslava Lesnaya	15; 21	18; 21
3	(Czech Republic) (Ukraine)	Jan Louda; Ruslan Sarsekenov	21; 17	21; 8
4	(Czech Republic) (Ukraine)	Magdalena Lajdová / Denisa Šikalová; Vladyslava Lesnaya / Anna Mikhalkova	21; 23	21; 14	21; 11
5	(Czech Republic) (Ukraine)	Michal Hubáček / Jan Somerlík; Oleksandr Kolesnik / Oleksandar Shmundyak	13; 21	17; 21

==== Turkey vs Italy ====
Turkey
5
RCS Arena, Court 2
26 March 2015, 18:00 UTC+2

Italy
0

			1	2	3
1	(Turkey) (Italy)	Melih Turgut / Fatma Nur Yavuz; Lukas Osele / Karin Maran	21; 9	21; 14
2	(Turkey) (Italy)	Muhammed Ali Kurt; Fabio Caponio	21; 9	21; 13
3	(Turkey) (Italy)	Aliye Demirbağ; Lisa Iversen	21; 10	21; 9
4	(Turkey) (Italy)	Serhat Salım / Baran Yüksel; Lukas Osele / Kevin Strobl	21; 16	21; 14
5	(Turkey) (Italy)	Bengisu Erçetin / Nazlıcan İnci; Karin Maran / Marah Punter	21; 19	21; 8

==== Italy vs Ukraine ====
Italy
0
RCS Arena, Court 3
27 March 2015, 16:00 UTC+2

Ukraine
5

			1	2	3
1	(Italy) (Ukraine)	Lisa Iversen; Maryna Ilyinskaya	17; 21	19; 21
2	(Italy) (Ukraine)	Fabio Caponio; Oleksandar Shmundyak	21; 16	16; 21	7; 21
3	(Italy) (Ukraine)	Karin Maran / Marah Punter; Vladyslava Lesnaya / Anna Mikhalkova	20; 22	15; 21
4	(Italy) (Ukraine)	Fabio Caponio / David Salutt; Oleksandr Kolesnik / Oleksandar Shmundyak	13; 21	13; 21
5	(Italy) (Ukraine)	Kevin Strobl / Karin Maran; Artem Tkachuk / Anna Mikhalkova	7; 21	21; 12	19; 21

==== Turkey vs Czech Republic ====
Turkey
5
RCS Arena, Court 4
27 March 2015, 16:00 UTC+2

Czech Republic
0

			1	2	3
1	(Turkey) (Czech Republic)	Kader İnal; Magdalena Lajdová	21; 14	21; 8
2	(Turkey) (Czech Republic)	Muhammed Ali Kurt; Jan Louda	21; 17	21; 9
3	(Turkey) (Czech Republic)	Kader İnal / Fatma Nur Yavuz; Magdalena Lajdová / Denisa Šikalová	21; 12	21; 8
4	(Turkey) (Czech Republic)	Muhammed Ali Kurt / Serhat Salım; Filip Budzel / Lukáš Holub	21; 15	21; 16
5	(Turkey) (Czech Republic)	Melih Turgut / Fatma Nur Yavuz; Michal Hubáček / Monika Švetnicková	23; 25	21; 11	21; 12

==== Czech Republic vs Italy ====
Czech Republic
4
RCS Arena, Court 4
28 March 2015, 14:00 UTC+2

Italy
1

			1	2	3
1	(Czech Republic) (Italy)	Jan Louda; Fabio Caponio	21; 19	16; 21	21; 17
2	(Czech Republic) (Italy)	Monika Švetnicková; Lisa Iversen	22; 20	21; 16
3	(Czech Republic) (Italy)	Filip Budzel / Lukáš Holub; Lukas Osele / Kevin Strobl	21; 18	19; 21	18; 21
4	(Czech Republic) (Italy)	Michaela Fuchsová / Tereza Švábíková; Silvia Garino / Lisa Iversen	21; 15	21; 13
5	(Czech Republic) (Italy)	Michal Hubáček / Monika Švetnicková; Kevin Strobl / Marah Punter	21; 6	21; 9

==== Turkey vs Ukraine ====
Turkey
5
RCS Arena, Court 6
28 March 2015, 14:00 UTC+2

Ukraine
0

			1	2	3
1	(Turkey) (Ukraine)	Aliye Demirbağ; Vladyslava Lesnaya	21; 8	21; 15
2	(Turkey) (Ukraine)	Muhammed Ali Kurt; Oleksandar Shmundyak	21; 10	21; 9
3	(Turkey) (Ukraine)	Kader İnal / Fatma Nur Yavuz; Maryna Ilyinskaya / Anna Mikhalkova	21; 5	19; 21	21; 14
4	(Turkey) (Ukraine)	Yunus Baş / Osman Uyhan; Oleksandr Kolesnik / Oleksandar Shmundyak	21; 12	22; 20
5	(Turkey) (Ukraine)	Melih Turgut / Fatma Nur Yavuz; Ruslan Sarsekenov / Vladyslava Lesnaya	21; 11	21; 11

=== Group 6 ===
Pos	Team	Pld	W	L	MF	MA	MD	GF	GA	GD	PF	PA	PD	Pts	Qualification	Russia	Belgium	Slovakia	Hungary
1	Russia	3	3	0	12	3	+9	25	8	+17	668	500	+168	3	Advance to knockout stage	—	4–1	4–1	4–1
2	Belgium	3	2	1	8	7	+1	19	16	+3	605	654	−49	2			—	3–2	4–1
3	Slovakia	3	1	2	7	8	−1	15	20	−5	609	655	−46	1				—	4–1
4	Hungary	3	0	3	3	12	−9	10	25	−15	603	676	−73	0					—

Source: BWF

==== Russia vs Hungary ====
Russia
4
RCS Arena, Court 4
26 March 2015, 18:00 UTC+2

Hungary
1

			1	2	3
1	(Russia) (Hungary)	Elizaveta Tarasova; Réka Madarász	23; 21	21; 7
2	(Russia) (Hungary)	Pavel Kotsarenko; Bence Pytel	21; 14	24; 26	15; 21
3	(Russia) (Hungary)	Alina Davletova / Ksenia Evgenova; Anett Karsai / Réka Madarász	21; 10	18; 21	21; 17
4	(Russia) (Hungary)	Sergey Molodov / Dmitrii Riabov; Dániel Kálfalvy / Márton Szerecz	21; 10	21; 17
5	(Russia) (Hungary)	Rodion Alimov / Alina Davletova; Tamás Madarász / Vivien Sándorházi	21; 16	21; 8

==== Belgium vs Slovakia ====
Belgium
3
RCS Arena, Court 6
26 March 2015, 18:00 UTC+2

Slovakia
2

			1	2	3
1	(Belgium) (Slovakia)	Rowan Scheurkogel; Richard Šmatlák	21; 14	21; 18
2	(Belgium) (Slovakia)	Presence Beelen; Lucia Grenčíková	21; 15	7; 21	21; 12
3	(Belgium) (Slovakia)	Rover Jay Babatido / Lawrence de Pauw; Milan Dratva / Bohumil Kašela	22; 20	18; 21	14; 21
4	(Belgium) (Slovakia)	Presence Beelen / Ann Knaepen; Zuzana Palková / Katarína Vargová	21; 15	21; 18
5	(Belgium) (Slovakia)	Daan Philips / Anna Bogemans; Milan Dratva / Katarína Šariščanová	19; 21	21; 17	13; 21

==== Russia vs Belgium ====
Russia
4
RCS Arena, Court TV 1
27 March 2015, 16:00 UTC+2

Belgium
1

			1	2	3
1	(Russia) (Belgium)	Anastasia Ronzhina; Anna Bogemans	21; 0	21; 6
2	(Russia) (Belgium)	Alexandr Kozyrev; Daan Philips	16; 21	19; 21
3	(Russia) (Belgium)	Alina Davletova / Ksenia Evgenova; Presence Beelen / Ann Knaepen	21; 14	21; 14
4	(Russia) (Belgium)	Sergey Molodov / Dmitrii Riabov; Rover Jay Babatido / Lawrence de Pauw	18; 21	21; 16	21; 14
5	(Russia) (Belgium)	Rodion Alimov / Alina Davletova; Rowan Scheurkogel / Ann Knaepen	21; 10	21; 14

==== Hungary vs Slovakia ====
Hungary
1
RCS Arena, Court TV 2
27 March 2015, 16:00 UTC+2

Slovakia
4

			1	2	3
1	(Hungary) (Slovakia)	Bence Pytel; Richard Šmatlák	21; 10	21; 11
2	(Hungary) (Slovakia)	Réka Madarász; Katarína Šariščanová	19; 21	21; 10	18; 21
3	(Hungary) (Slovakia)	Dániel Kálfalvy / Márton Szerecz; Milan Dratva / Bohumil Kašela	12; 21	15; 21
4	(Hungary) (Slovakia)	Tittina Papp / Vivien Sándorházi; Zuzana Palková / Katarína Vargová	21; 15	17; 21	17; 21
5	(Hungary) (Slovakia)	Tamás Madarász / Réka Madarász; Milan Dratva / Katarína Šariščanová	17; 21	17; 21

==== Hungary vs Belgium ====
Hungary
1
RCS Arena, Court 3
28 March 2015, 14:00 UTC+2

Belgium
4

			1	2	3
1	(Hungary) (Belgium)	Vivien Sándorházi; Anna Bogemans	21; 19	21; 7
2	(Hungary) (Belgium)	Bence Pytel; Daan Philips	16; 21	19; 21
3	(Hungary) (Belgium)	Anett Karsai / Réka Madarász; Presence Beelen / Ann Knaepen	13; 21	16; 21
4	(Hungary) (Belgium)	Dániel Kálfalvy / Márton Szerecz; Rover Jay Babatido / Lawrence de Pauw	18; 21	17; 21
5	(Hungary) (Belgium)	Tamás Madarász / Réka Madarász; Rowan Scheurkogel / Ann Knaepen	18; 21	22; 20	18; 21

==== Russia vs Slovakia ====
Russia
4
RCS Arena, Court 5
28 March 2015, 14:00 UTC+2

Slovakia
1

			1	2	3
1	(Russia) (Slovakia)	Rodion Alimov / Alina Davletova; Bohumil Kašela / Zuzana Palková	21; 9	21; 17
2	(Russia) (Slovakia)	Sergey Molodov; Milan Dratva	21; 13	21; 19
3	(Russia) (Slovakia)	Elizaveta Pyatina; Katarína Šariščanová	13; 21	18; 21
4	(Russia) (Slovakia)	Sergey Molodov / Dmitrii Riabov; Milan Dratva / Bohumil Kašela	21; 17	21; 16
5	(Russia) (Slovakia)	Alina Davletova / Ksenia Evgenova; Zuzana Palková / Katarína Vargová	21; 11	21; 17

=== Group 7 ===
Pos	Team	Pld	W	L	MF	MA	MD	GF	GA	GD	PF	PA	PD	Pts	Qualification	Spain	Ireland	Romania	Norway	Cyprus
1	Spain	4	4	0	17	3	+14	34	6	+28	814	555	+259	4	Advance to knockout stage	—	5–0	5–0	4–1	3–2
2	Ireland	4	3	1	9	11	−2	21	25	−4	802	837	−35	3			—	3–2	3–2	3–2
3	Romania	4	2	2	9	11	−2	20	25	−5	771	790	−19	2				—	3–2	4–1
4	Norway	4	1	3	8	12	−4	17	26	−9	730	827	−97	1					—	3–2
5	Cyprus	4	0	4	7	13	−6	18	28	−10	766	874	−108	0						—

Source: BWF

==== Spain vs Cyprus ====
Spain
3
RCS Arena, Court 4
26 March 2015, 10:00 UTC+2

Cyprus
2

			1	2	3
1	(Spain) (Cyprus)	Sara Peñalver; Ioanna Pissi	21; 11	21; 4
2	(Spain) (Cyprus)	Pablo Sanmartin; Elias Nicolaou	18; 21	16; 21
3	(Spain) (Cyprus)	Clara Azurmendi / Isabel Fernández; Eleni Christodoulou / Stephanie Pinharry	17; 21	15; 21
4	(Spain) (Cyprus)	Luís Enrique Peñalver / Javier Suárez; Elias Nicolaou / Kyriacos Pissis	21; 12	21; 15
5	(Spain) (Cyprus)	Alejo Javier Ibeas / Miren Josebe Azcue; Philippos Kneknas / Eleni Christodoulou	21; 15	21; 11

==== Norway vs Romania ====
Norway
2
RCS Arena, Court 6
26 March 2015, 10:00 UTC+2

Romania
3

			1	2	3
1	(Norway) (Romania)	Peter Rønn Stensæth; Collins Valentine Filimon	18; 21	21; 19	18; 21
2	(Norway) (Romania)	Vilde Espeseth; Andra Olariu	7; 21	8; 21
3	(Norway) (Romania)	Sturla Flåten Jørgensen / Carl Christian Mork; Eugeniu-Cosmin Panfil / David Nitu	21; 12	22; 20
4	(Norway) (Romania)	Solvår Flåten Jørgensen / Linn Lilian Stenrud; Miruna Elena Nitu / Cătălina Simionescu	12; 21	16; 21
5	(Norway) (Romania)	Sturla Flåten Jørgensen / Solvår Flåten Jørgensen; Collins Valentine Filimon / Andra Olariu	21; 19	21; 15

==== Spain vs Romania ====
Spain
5
RCS Arena, Court 3
26 March 2015, 18:00 UTC+2

Romania
0

			1	2	3
1	(Spain) (Romania)	Alejo Javier Ibeas / Miren Josebe Azcue; Collins Valentine Filimon / Cătălina Simionescu	21; 16	21; 16
2	(Spain) (Romania)	Clara Azurmendi; Andra Olariu	21; 5	22; 20
3	(Spain) (Romania)	Luís Enrique Peñalver; Collins Valentine Filimon	21; 7	21; 15
4	(Spain) (Romania)	Clara Azurmendi / Isabel Fernández; Miruna Elena Nitu / Cătălina Simionescu	21; 17	21; 8
5	(Spain) (Romania)	Alejo Javier Ibeas / Javier Suárez; Eugeniu-Cosmin Panfil / David Nitu	21; 12	21; 8

==== Cyprus vs Ireland ====
Cyprus
2
RCS Arena, Court 5
26 March 2015, 18:00 UTC+2

Ireland
3

			1	2	3
1	(Cyprus) (Republic of Ireland)	Philippos Kneknas / Eleni Christodoulou; Paul Reynolds / Rachael Darragh	14; 21	21; 18	11; 21
2	(Cyprus) (Republic of Ireland)	Elias Nicolaou; Sam McKay	21; 18	21; 19
3	(Cyprus) (Republic of Ireland)	Stephanie Pinharry; Sara Boyle	14; 21	21; 13	21; 13
4	(Cyprus) (Republic of Ireland)	Elias Nicolaou / Kyriacos Pissis; Sam McKay / Paul Reynolds	21; 18	18; 21	15; 21
5	(Cyprus) (Republic of Ireland)	Eleni Christodoulou / Stephanie Pinharry; Sara Boyle / Rachael Darragh	17; 21	15; 21

==== Spain vs Norway ====
Spain
4
RCS Arena, Court 5
27 March 2015, 12:30 UTC+2

Norway
1

			1	2	3
1	(Spain) (Norway)	Alejo Javier Ibeas / Miren Josebe Azcue; Sturla Flåten Jørgensen / Solvår Flåten Jørgensen	21; 9	21; 18
2	(Spain) (Norway)	Pablo Sanmartin; Torjus Flåtten	16; 21	17; 21
3	(Spain) (Norway)	Isabel Fernández; Vilde Espeseth	21; 12	21; 11
4	(Spain) (Norway)	Luís Enrique Peñalver / Javier Suárez; Sturla Flåten Jørgensen / Carl Christian Mork	21; 12	21; 11
5	(Spain) (Norway)	Clara Azurmendi / Sara Peñalver; Solvår Flåten Jørgensen / Linn Lilian Stenrud	21; 14	21; 19

==== Ireland vs Romania ====
Ireland
3
RCS Arena, Court 6
27 March 2015, 12:30 UTC+2

Romania
2

			1	2	3
1	(Republic of Ireland) (Romania)	Paul Reynolds / Sara Boyle; Collins Valentine Filimon / Cătălina Simionescu	21; 19	22; 24	16; 21
2	(Republic of Ireland) (Romania)	Rachael Darragh; Andra Olariu	21; 14	21; 17
3	(Republic of Ireland) (Romania)	Sam McKay; Collins Valentine Filimon	11; 21	10; 21
4	(Republic of Ireland) (Romania)	Sara Boyle / Rachael Darragh; Miruna Elena Nitu / Cătălina Simionescu	21; 14	20; 22	21; 15
5	(Republic of Ireland) (Romania)	Sam McKay / Paul Reynolds; Eugeniu-Cosmin Panfil / David Nitu	21; 14	21; 10

==== Cyprus vs Romania ====
Cyprus
1
RCS Arena, Court 1
27 March 2015, 19:30 UTC+2

Romania
4

			1	2	3
1	(Cyprus) (Romania)	Stephanie Pinharry; Andra Olariu	18; 21	11; 21
2	(Cyprus) (Romania)	Elias Nicolaou; Collins Valentine Filimon	10; 21	13; 21
3	(Cyprus) (Romania)	Eleni Christodoulou / Stephanie Pinharry; Andra Olariu / Cătălina Simionescu	20; 22	24; 22	19; 21
4	(Cyprus) (Romania)	Elias Nicolaou / Kyriacos Pissis; Eugeniu-Cosmin Panfil / David Nitu	21; 23	21; 17	27; 25
5	(Cyprus) (Romania)	Philippos Kneknas / Eleni Christodoulou; Collins Valentine Filimon / Cătălina Simionescu	17; 21	16; 21

==== Ireland vs Norway ====
Ireland
3
RCS Arena, Court 3
27 March 2015, 19:30 UTC+2

Norway
2

			1	2	3
1	(Republic of Ireland) (Norway)	Paul Reynolds / Sara Boyle; Carl Christian Mork / Charlotte Leinan	21; 19	21; 13
2	(Republic of Ireland) (Norway)	Norman Lau; Peter Rønn Stensæth	12; 21	12; 21
3	(Republic of Ireland) (Norway)	Rachael Darragh; Vilde Espeseth	21; 12	21; 14
4	(Republic of Ireland) (Norway)	Sam McKay / Paul Reynolds; Sturla Flåten Jørgensen / Carl Christian Mork	16; 21	21; 16	12; 21
5	(Republic of Ireland) (Norway)	Sara Boyle / Rachael Darragh; Solvår Flåten Jørgensen / Linn Lilian Stenrud	21; 14	21; 13

==== Spain vs Ireland ====
Spain
5
RCS Arena, Court 1
28 March 2015, 14:00 UTC+2

Ireland
0

			1	2	3
1	(Spain) (Republic of Ireland)	Alejo Javier Ibeas / Miren Josebe Azcue; Paul Reynolds / Sara Boyle	21; 11	21; 17
2	(Spain) (Republic of Ireland)	Luis Enrique Peñalver; Norman Lau	21; 11	21; 8
3	(Spain) (Republic of Ireland)	Clara Azurmendi; Rachael Darragh	21; 13	21; 12
4	(Spain) (Republic of Ireland)	Alejo Javier Ibeas / Luís Enrique Peñalver; Sam McKay / Paul Reynolds	21; 19	21; 7
5	(Spain) (Republic of Ireland)	Clara Azurmendi / Isabel Fernández; Sara Boyle / Rachael Darragh	21; 15	21; 18

==== Cyprus vs Norway ====
Cyprus
2
RCS Arena, Court 2
28 March 2015, 14:00 UTC+2

Norway
3

			1	2	3
1	(Cyprus) (Norway)	Philippos Kneknas / Eleni Christodoulou; Sturla Flåten Jørgensen / Solvår Flåten Jørgensen	21; 15	19; 21	21; 23
2	(Cyprus) (Norway)	Elias Nicolaou; Torjus Flåtten	20; 22	16; 21
3	(Cyprus) (Norway)	Stephanie Pinharry; Vilde Espeseth	21; 18	21; 15
4	(Cyprus) (Norway)	Elias Nicolaou / Kyriacos Pissis; Sturla Flåten Jørgensen / Carl Christian Mork	15; 21	20; 22
5	(Cyprus) (Norway)	Eleni Christodoulou / Stephanie Pinharry; Solvår Flåten Jørgensen / Linn Lilian Stenrud	21; 17	21; 17

=== Group 8 ===
Pos	Team	Pld	W	L	MF	MA	MD	GF	GA	GD	PF	PA	PD	Pts	Qualification	Netherlands	Estonia	Finland	Switzerland	Greece
1	Netherlands	4	4	0	17	3	+14	35	7	+28	842	547	+295	4	Advance to knockout stage	—	4–1	4–1	4–1	5–0
2	Estonia	4	2	2	12	8	+4	26	19	+7	833	734	+99	2			—	4–1	2–3	5–0
3	Finland	4	2	2	11	9	+2	23	21	+2	775	744	+31	2				—	4–1	5–0
4	Switzerland	4	2	2	10	10	0	23	21	+2	817	743	+74	2					—	5–0
5	Greece	4	0	4	0	20	−20	1	40	−39	357	856	−499	0						—

Source: BWF

==== Switzerland vs Estonia ====
Switzerland
3
RCS Arena, Court 3
26 March 2015, 10:00 UTC+2

Estonia
2

			1	2	3
1	(Switzerland) (Estonia)	Dominik Bütikofer; Heiko Zoober	21; 11	21; 17
2	(Switzerland) (Estonia)	Ronja Stern; Kristin Kuuba	15; 21	23; 21	13; 21
3	(Switzerland) (Estonia)	Dominik Bütikofer / Julian Lehmann; Mikk Õunmaa / Heiko Zoober	19; 21	21; 16	21; 15
4	(Switzerland) (Estonia)	Ronja Stern / Simone von Rotz; Kati-Kreet Käsner / Sale-Liis Teesalu	21; 18	24; 22
5	(Switzerland) (Estonia)	Thibault Bernetti / Chantal von Rotz; Mihkel Laanes / Kristin Kuuba	13; 21	13; 21

==== Netherlands vs Greece ====
Netherlands
5
RCS Arena, Court 5
26 March 2015, 10:00 UTC+2

Greece
0

			1	2	3
1	(Netherlands) (Greece)	Joran Kweekel; Athanasios Geranis	21; 10	21; 5
2	(Netherlands) (Greece)	Alida Chen; Maria-Eleni Rougliou	21; 10	21; 6
3	(Netherlands) (Greece)	Ruben Jille / Alex Vlaar; Panagiotis Botelis / Asimakis Vlahopoulos	21; 7	21; 8
4	(Netherlands) (Greece)	Debora Jille / Imke van der Aar; Vasiliki Andreadou / Pantelia Bartzou	21; 1	21; 6
5	(Netherlands) (Greece)	Ruben Jille / Alida Chen; Asimakis Vlahopoulos / Evaggelia Koronidou	21; 1	21; 1

==== Netherlands vs Switzerland ====
Netherlands
4
RCS Arena, Court 2
27 March 2015, 09:00 UTC+2

Switzerland
1

			1	2	3
1	(Netherlands) (Switzerland)	Alex Vlaar; Dominik Bütikofer	15; 21	19; 21
2	(Netherlands) (Switzerland)	Alida Chen; Ronja Stern	21; 8	21; 17
3	(Netherlands) (Switzerland)	Ruben Jille / Alex Vlaar; Dominik Bütikofer / Julian Lehmann	25; 23	21; 18
4	(Netherlands) (Switzerland)	Debora Jille / Imke van der Aar; Ronja Stern / Simone von Rotz	21; 14	21; 14
5	(Netherlands) (Switzerland)	Ruben Jille / Alida Chen; Thibault Bernetti / Chantal von Rotz	21; 10	21; 12

==== Greece vs Finland ====
Greece
0
RCS Arena, Court 3
27 March 2015, 09:00 UTC+2

Finland
5

			1	2	3
1	(Greece) (Finland)	Panagiotis Botelis; Valtteri Nieminen	4; 21	3; 21
2	(Greece) (Finland)	Maria-Eleni Rougliou; Tuuli Härkönen	14; 21	21; 16	8; 21
3	(Greece) (Finland)	Panagiotis Botelis / Athanasios Geranis; Arttu Mahonen / Iiro Nokkala	7; 21	7; 21
4	(Greece) (Finland)	Pantelia Bartzou / Evaggelia Koronidou; Elina Niiranen / Linnea Vainula	7; 21	13; 21
5	(Greece) (Finland)	Athanasios Geranis / Maria-Eleni Rougliou; Arttu Mahonen / Annmarie Oksa	18; 21	8; 21

==== Netherlands vs Estonia ====
Netherlands
4
RCS Arena, Court 5
27 March 2015, 16:00 UTC+2

Estonia
1

			1	2	3
1	(Netherlands) (Estonia)	Joran Kweekel; Heiko Zoober	14; 21	21; 14	21; 15
2	(Netherlands) (Estonia)	Alida Chen; Kristin Kuuba	21; 9	21; 13
3	(Netherlands) (Estonia)	Ruben Jille / Alex Vlaar; Mikk Õunmaa / Heiko Zoober	21; 14	21; 11
4	(Netherlands) (Estonia)	Debora Jille / Imke van der Aar; Kristin Kuuba / Helina Rüütel	21; 16	16; 21	10; 21
5	(Netherlands) (Estonia)	Ruben Jille / Alida Chen; Mihkel Laanes / Kati-Kreet Marran	21; 14	21; 16

==== Switzerland vs Finland ====
Switzerland
1
RCS Arena, Court 6
27 March 2015, 16:00 UTC+2

Finland
4

			1	2	3
1	(Switzerland) (Finland)	Julian Lehmann; Valtteri Nieminen	14; 21	16; 21
2	(Switzerland) (Finland)	Simone von Rotz; Annmarie Oksa	19; 21	21; 19	16; 21
3	(Switzerland) (Finland)	Quentin Filliettaz / Cyril Hohl; Arttu Mahonen / Iiro Nokkala	17; 21	18; 21
4	(Switzerland) (Finland)	Ronja Stern / Simone von Rotz; Tuuli Härkönen / Annmarie Oksa	21; 17	21; 15
5	(Switzerland) (Finland)	Thibault Bernetti / Chantal von Rotz; Iiro Nokkala / Linnea Vainula	21; 23	21; 10	19; 21

==== Greece vs Switzerland ====
Greece
0
RCS Arena, Court 1
28 March 2015, 10:00 UTC+2

Switzerland
5

			1	2	3
1	(Greece) (Switzerland)	Athanasios Geranis; Dominik Bütikofer	12; 21	9; 21
2	(Greece) (Switzerland)	Pantelia Bartzou; Simone von Rotz	6; 21	10; 21
3	(Greece) (Switzerland)	Panagiotis Botelis / Asimakis Vlahopoulos; Quentin Filliettaz / Cyril Hohl	7; 21	5; 21
4	(Greece) (Switzerland)	Evaggelia Koronidou / Maria-Eleni Rougliou; Ronja Stern / Simone von Rotz	6; 21	13; 21
5	(Greece) (Switzerland)	Panagiotis Botelis / Vasiliki Andreadou; Thibault Bernetti / Chantal von Rotz	9; 21	4; 21

==== Finland vs Estonia ====
Finland
1
RCS Arena, Court 2
28 March 2015, 10:00 UTC+2

Estonia
4

			1	2	3
1	(Finland) (Estonia)	Iiro Nokkala / Linnea Vainula; Mihkel Laanes / Helina Rüütel	14; 21	21; 18	11; 21
2	(Finland) (Estonia)	Annmarie Oksa; Kristin Kuuba	16; 21	22; 24
3	(Finland) (Estonia)	Valtteri Nieminen; Mihkel Laanes	21; 12	21; 12
4	(Finland) (Estonia)	Elina Niiranen / Linnea Vainula; Kristin Kuuba / Helina Rüütel	10; 21	12; 21
5	(Finland) (Estonia)	Arttu Mahonen / Iiro Nokkala; Mikk Õunmaa / Heiko Zoober	9; 21	12; 21

==== Netherlands vs Finland ====
Netherlands
4
RCS Arena, Court 3
28 March 2015, 18:00 UTC+2

Finland
1

			1	2	3
1	(Netherlands) (Finland)	Alex Vlaar; Valtteri Nieminen	18; 21	11; 21
2	(Netherlands) (Finland)	Alida Chen; Annmarie Oksa	21; 16	21; 13
3	(Netherlands) (Finland)	Ruben Jille / Alex Vlaar; Arttu Mahonen / Iiro Nokkala	21; 8	21; 18
4	(Netherlands) (Finland)	Debora Jille / Imke van der Aar; Elina Niiranen / Linnea Vainula	21; 12	21; 11
5	(Netherlands) (Finland)	Ruben Jille / Alida Chen; Arttu Mahonen / Tuuli Härkönen	21; 16	21; 13

==== Greece vs Estonia ====
Greece
0
RCS Arena, Court 6
28 March 2015, 18:00 UTC+2

Estonia
5

			1	2	3
1	(Greece) (Estonia)	Athanasios Geranis / Maria-Eleni Rougliou; Kati-Kreet Marran / Mario Saunpère	16; 21	16; 21
2	(Greece) (Estonia)	Asimakis Vlahopoulos; Mihkel Laanes	5; 21	5; 21
3	(Greece) (Estonia)	Maria-Eleni Rougliou; Sale-Liis Teesalu	10; 21	14; 21
4	(Greece) (Estonia)	Panagiotis Botelis / Athanasios Geranis; Mihkel Laanes / Mario Saunpère	12; 21	15; 21
5	(Greece) (Estonia)	Vasiliki Andreadou / Pantelia Bartzou; Kati-Kreet Marran / Sale-Liis Teesalu	11; 21	7; 21

== Knockout stage ==
=== Bracket ===
Quarter-finals
Denmark	3
Netherlands	0
Germany	2
Spain	3
Turkey	1
France	3
Russia	1
England	3

Semi-finals
Denmark	2
Spain	3
France	2
England	3

Final
Spain	3
England	2

=== Quarter-finals ===
==== Denmark vs Netherlands ====
Denmark
3
RCS Arena, Court 4
29 March 2015, 10:00 UTC+2

Netherlands
0

			1	2	3
1	(Denmark) (Netherlands)	Anders Antonsen; Joran Kweekel	21; 12	21; 17
2	(Denmark) (Netherlands)	Julie Dawall Jakobsen; Alida Chen	21; 19	21; 19
3	(Denmark) (Netherlands)	Mathias Bay-Smidt / Frederik Søgaard; Ruben Jille / Alex Vlaar	21; 9	21; 11
4	(Denmark) (Netherlands)	Sara Lundgaard / Marie Louise Steffensen; Debora Jille / Imke van der Aar				not played
5	(Denmark) (Netherlands)	Alexander Bond / Ditte Søby; Ruben Jille / Alida Chen				not played

==== Germany vs Spain ====
Germany
2
RCS Arena, Court 3
29 March 2015, 10:00 UTC+2

Spain
3

			1	2	3
1	(Germany) (Spain)	Max Weißkirchen / Eva Janssens; Alejo Javier Ibeas / Miren Josebe Azcue	21; 14	21; 13
2	(Germany) (Spain)	Luise Heim; Clara Azurmendi	14; 21	11; 21
3	(Germany) (Spain)	Max Weisskirchen; Luís Enrique Peñalver	19; 21	21; 14	21; 13
4	(Germany) (Spain)	Eva Janssens / Yvonne Li; Clara Azurmendi / Isabel Fernández	14; 21	12; 21
5	(Germany) (Spain)	Bjarne Geiss / Daniel Seifert; Alejo Javier Ibeas / Luís Enrique Peñalver	21; 18	18; 21	15; 21

==== Turkey vs France ====
Turkey
1
RCS Arena, Court 1
29 March 2015, 10:00 UTC+2

France
3

			1	2	3
1	(Turkey) (France)	Melih Turgut / Fatma Nur Yavuz; Anne Tran / Thomas Vallez	21; 18	20; 22	18; 21
2	(Turkey) (France)	Muhammed Ali Kurt; Vincent Medina	8; 21	21; 18	21; 18
3	(Turkey) (France)	Kader İnal; Lole Courtois	11; 21	20; 22
4	(Turkey) (France)	Haktan Doğan / Muhammed Ali Kurt; Toma Junior Popov / Thomas Vallez	14; 21	17; 21
5	(Turkey) (France)	Kader İnal / Fatma Nur Yavuz; Joanna Chaube / Anne Tran				not played

==== Russia vs England ====
Russia
1
RCS Arena, Court 2
29 March 2015, 10:00 UTC+2

England
3

			1	2	3
1	(Russia) (England)	Rodion Alimov / Alina Davletova; Ben Lane / Jessica Pugh	22; 24	22; 20	17; 21
2	(Russia) (England)	Anastasia Ronzhina; Ira Banerjee	21; 15	23; 21
3	(Russia) (England)	Rodion Alimov; Sean Vendy	19; 21	16; 21
4	(Russia) (England)	Alina Davletova / Ksenia Evgenova; Ira Banerjee / Jessica Pugh	14; 21	21; 18	13; 21
5	(Russia) (England)	Sergey Molodov / Dmitrii Riabov; Ben Lane / Sean Vendy				not played

=== Semi-finals ===
==== Denmark vs Spain ====
Denmark
2
RCS Arena, Court 2
29 March 2015, 17:00 UTC+2

Spain
3

			1	2	3
1	(Denmark) (Spain)	Alexander Bond / Ditte Søby; Alejo Javier Ibeas / Miren Josebe Azcue	19; 21	21; 12	22; 20
2	(Denmark) (Spain)	Anders Antonsen; Luís Enrique Peñalver	15; 21	21; 13	15; 21
3	(Denmark) (Spain)	Mia Blichfeldt; Clara Azurmendi	21; 16	17; 21	19; 21
4	(Denmark) (Spain)	Joel Eipe / Frederik Søgaard; Alejo Javier Ibeas / Javier Suárez	21; 12	21; 6
5	(Denmark) (Spain)	Julie Dawall Jakobsen / Ditte Søby; Clara Azurmendi / Isabel Fernández	21; 19	11; 21	21; 23

==== France vs England ====
France
2
RCS Arena, Court 1
29 March 2015, 17:00 UTC+2

England
3

			1	2	3
1	(France) (England)	Toma Junior Popov / Anne Tran; Ben Lane / Jessica Pugh	16; 21	15; 21
2	(France) (England)	Lole Courtois; Lydia Jane Powell	21; 9	21; 19
3	(France) (England)	Toma Junior Popov; Sean Vendy	21; 14	21; 23	21; 18
4	(France) (England)	Lole Courtois / Anne Tran; Ira Banerjee / Jessica Pugh	16; 21	21; 10	16; 21
5	(France) (England)	Alexandre Hammer / Thomas Vallez; Ben Lane / Sean Vendy	17; 21	14; 21

=== Final ===
==== Spain vs England ====
Spain
3
RCS Arena, Court 1
30 March 2015, 10:00 UTC+2

England
2

			1	2	3
1	(Spain) (England)	Alejo Javier Ibeas / Miren Josebe Azcue; Ben Lane / Jessica Pugh	15; 21	14; 21
2	(Spain) (England)	Luís Enrique Peñalver; Sean Vendy	21; 16	21; 15
3	(Spain) (England)	Clara Azurmendi; Kirby Ngan	21; 13	21; 6
4	(Spain) (England)	Alejo Javier Ibeas / Luís Enrique Peñalver; Ben Lane / Sean Vendy	19; 21	14; 21
5	(Spain) (England)	Clara Azurmendi / Isabel Fernández; Ira Banerjee / Jessica Pugh	21; 18	23; 21
