= 2014 BWF World Junior Championships – Team event group stage =

List of badminton tournaments

This article lists the complete results of the group stage of the 2014 BWF World Junior Championships – Teams event in Alor Setar, Malaysia.

== Group W1 ==
Team	Pts	Pld	W	L	MF	MA
South Korea	3	3	3	0	15	0
Singapore	2	3	2	1	10	5
Botswana	1	3	1	2	5	10
Mongolia	0	3	0	3	0	15

=== South Korea vs Botswana ===
South Korea
5
Stadium Sultan Abdul Halim Court 1
7 April 2014

Botswana
0

			1	2	3
1	(South Korea) (Botswana)	Park Kyung-hoon / Park Keun-hye; Tshepo Perekisi / Banewang Tshoganetso	21; 5	21; 4
2	(South Korea) (Botswana)	Seo Seung-jae; Tumisang Olekantse	21; 5	21; 8
3	(South Korea) (Botswana)	Kim Ga-eun; Tessa Kabelo	21; 7	21; 7
4	(South Korea) (Botswana)	Kim Jae-hwan / Kim Jung-ho; Tumisang Olekantse / Tshepo Perekisi	21; 1	21; 11
5	(South Korea) (Botswana)	Kim Hye-jeong / Kong Hee-yong; Banewang Tshoganetso / Tessa Kabelo	21; 4	21; 4

=== Singapore vs Mongolia ===
Singapore
5
Stadium Sultan Abdul Halim Court 2
7 April 2014

Mongolia
0

			1	2	3
1	(Singapore) (Mongolia)	Bernard Ong Soon Yang / Yeo Jiamin; Tuvshinzaya Ankhbayar / Namuunzul Batbayar	21; 4	21; 7
2	(Singapore) (Mongolia)	Ryan Ng Zin Rei; Bilegjargal Bayarbyamba	21; 3	21; 4
3	(Singapore) (Mongolia)	Bernard Ong Soon Yang / Tan Mingshun; Tuguldur Boldbaatar / Ulziibadrakh Nanzad	21; 4	21; 2
4	(Singapore) (Mongolia)	Liang Xiaoyu; Narantsetseg Bayarsaikhan	21; 1	21; 4
5	(Singapore) (Mongolia)	Elaine Chua Yi Ling / Yeo Jiamin; Namuunzul Batbayar / Chanchiv Olzvoi	21; 4	21; 2

=== South Korea vs Mongolia ===
South Korea
5
Stadium Sultan Abdul Halim Court 1
8 April 2014

Mongolia
0

			1	2	3
1	(South Korea) (Mongolia)	Choi Jong-woo / Kim Hyang-in; Bilegjargal Bayarbyamba / Narantsetseg Bayarsaikhan	21; 3	21; 1
2	(South Korea) (Mongolia)	Lee Jun-su; Tuguldur Boldbaatar	21; 0	21; 8
3	(South Korea) (Mongolia)	Yoon Min-ah; Namuunzul Batbayar	21; 8	21; 5
4	(South Korea) (Mongolia)	Choi Jong-woo / Park Kyung-hoon; Tuvshinzaya Ankhbayar / Ulziibadrakh Nanzad	21; 3	21; 3
5	(South Korea) (Mongolia)	Park Keun-hye / Yoon Min-ah; Narantsetseg Bayarsaikhan / Chanchiv Olzvoi	21; 2	21; 2

=== Singapore vs Botswana ===
Singapore
5
Stadium Sultan Abdul Halim Court 2
8 April 2014

Botswana
0

			1	2	3
1	(Singapore) (Botswana)	Tan Mingshun / Ong Ren Ne; Tshepo Perekisi / Banewang Tshoganetso	21; 12	21; 8
2	(Singapore) (Botswana)	Bernard Ong Soon Yang; Tumisang Olekantse	21; 4	21; 5
3	(Singapore) (Botswana)	Yeo Jiamin; Tessa Kabelo	21; 3	21; 7
4	(Singapore) (Botswana)	Darryl Ng You Joe / Ngiam Bin; Tumisang Olekantse / Tshepo Perekisi	21; 14	21; 14
5	(Singapore) (Botswana)	Ong Ren Ne / Crystal Wong Jia Ying; Banewang Tshoganetso / Tessa Kabelo	21; 7	21; 7

=== South Korea vs Singapore ===
South Korea
5
Stadium Sultan Abdul Halim Court 7
8 April 2014

Singapore
0

			1	2	3
1	(South Korea) (Singapore)	Kim Jung-ho / Kim Hye-jeong; Ryan Ng Zin Rei / Elaine Chua Yi Ling	21; 8	21; 15
2	(South Korea) (Singapore)	Seo Seung-jae; Bernad Ong Soon Yang	21; 9	21; 20
3	(South Korea) (Singapore)	Kim Ga-eun; Liang Xiaoyu	15; 21	21; 14	23; 21
4	(South Korea) (Singapore)	Kim Jae-hwan / Kim Jung-ho; Ryan Ng Zin Rei / Bernard Ong Soon Yang	21; 19	21; 12
5	(South Korea) (Singapore)	Kim Hye-jeong / Kong Hee-yong; Elaine Chua Yi Ling / Yeo Jiamin	21; 15	16; 21	21; 18

=== Mongolia vs Botswana ===
Mongolia
0
Stadium Sultan Abdul Halim Court 8
8 April 2014

Botswana
5

			1	2	3
1	(Mongolia) (Botswana)	Bilegjargal Bayarbyamba; Tumisang Olekantse	16; 21	13; 21
2	(Mongolia) (Botswana)	Narantsetseg Bayarsaikhan; Tessa Kabelo	7; 21	16; 21
3	(Mongolia) (Botswana)	Tuguldur Boldbaatar / Ulziibadrakh Nanzad; Tumisang Olekantse / Tshepo Perekisi	8; 21	18; 21
4	(Mongolia) (Botswana)	Namuunzul Batbayar / Chanchiv Olzvoi; Banewang Tshoganetso / Tessa Kabelo	20; 22	16; 21
5	(Mongolia) (Botswana)	Bilegjargal Bayarbyamba / Narantsetseg Bayarsaikhan; Tshepo Perekisi / Banewang Tshoganetso	12; 21	7; 21

== Group W2 ==
Team	Pts	Pld	W	L	MF	MA
Thailand	3	3	3	0	15	0
Russia	2	3	2	1	9	6
Netherlands	1	3	1	2	6	9
South Africa	0	3	0	3	0	15

=== Thailand vs Netherlands ===
Thailand
5
Stadium Sultan Abdul Halim Court 3
7 April 2014

Netherlands
0

			1	2	3
1	(Thailand) (Netherlands)	Dechapol Puavaranukroh / Puttita Supajirakul; Ruben Jille / Alida Chen	21; 12	21; 10
2	(Thailand) (Netherlands)	Kantaphon Wangcharoen; Alex Vlaar	21; 13	21; 13
3	(Thailand) (Netherlands)	Busanan Ongbumrungpan; Imke van der Aar	21; 6	21; 7
4	(Thailand) (Netherlands)	Kittinupong Kedren / Dechapol Puavaranukroh; Ruben Jille / Alex Vlaar	21; 10	21; 8
5	(Thailand) (Netherlands)	Pacharapun Chochuwong / Chanisa Teachavorasinskun; Alida Chen / Imke van der Aar	20; 22	21; 13	21; 11

=== Russia vs South Africa ===
Russia
5
Stadium Sultan Abdul Halim Court 4
7 April 2014

South Africa
0

			1	2	3
1	(Russia) (South Africa)	Rodion Alimov / Alina Davletova; Michael Jennings / Anri Schoonees	21; 12	21; 11
2	(Russia) (South Africa)	Alexandr Kozyrev; Ruan Snyman	21; 5	21; 16
3	(Russia) (South Africa)	Sergey Molodov / Dmitrii Riabov; Michael Jennings / Bongani Von Bodenstein	21; 14	21; 11
4	(Russia) (South Africa)	Anastasia Ronzhina; Johanita Scholtz	21; 10	21; 14
5	(Russia) (South Africa)	Vitalia Chigintseva / Elizaveta Pyatina; Anri Schoonees / Janke van der Vyver	21; 15	21; 7

=== Thailand vs South Africa ===
Thailand
5
Stadium Sultan Abdul Halim Court 1
7 April 2014

South Africa
0

			1	2	3
1	(Thailand) (South Africa)	Tanupat Viriyangkura / Pacharapun Chochuwong; Bongani Von Bodenstein / Anri Schoonees	21; 13	21; 3
2	(Thailand) (South Africa)	Mek Narongrit; Ruan Snyman	21; 5	21; 8
3	(Thailand) (South Africa)	Supak Jomkoh / Arkornnit Thaptimdong; Michael Jennings / Bongani Von Bodenstein	21; 10	21; 11
4	(Thailand) (South Africa)	Pornpawee Chochuwong; Johanita Scholtz	21; 6	21; 8
5	(Thailand) (South Africa)	Pacharapun Chochuwong / Chanisa Teachavorasinskun; Anri Schoonees / Janke van der Vyver	21; 4	21; 7

=== Russia vs Netherlands ===
Russia
4
Stadium Sultan Abdul Halim Court 2
7 April 2014

Netherlands
1

			1	2	3
1	(Russia) (Netherlands)	Rodion Alimov / Alina Davletova; Ruben Jille / Imke van der Aar	21; 15	11; 21	19; 21
2	(Russia) (Netherlands)	Sergey Molodov; Alex Vlaar	25; 23	21; 14
3	(Russia) (Netherlands)	Elizaveta Pyatina; Alida Chen	21; 14	21; 13
4	(Russia) (Netherlands)	Rodion Alimov / Sergey Molodov; Ruben Jille / Alex Vlaar	21; 8	8; 21	21; 19
5	(Russia) (Netherlands)	Alina Davletova / Anastasia Ronzhina; Alida Chen / Imke van der Aar	21; 11	21; 14

=== Thailand vs Russia ===
Thailand
5
Stadium Sultan Abdul Halim Court 3
8 April 2014

Russia
0

			1	2	3
1	(Thailand) (Russia)	Kittinupong Ketlen / Dechapol Puavaranukroh; Rodion Alimov / Sergey Molodov	21; 17	21; 12
2	(Thailand) (Russia)	Busanan Ongbumrungpan; Elizaveta Pyatina	21; 11	21; 17
3	(Thailand) (Russia)	Kantaphon Wangcharoen; Sergey Molodov	21; 5	21; 12
4	(Thailand) (Russia)	Pacharapun Chochuwong / Chanisa Teachavorasinskun; Alina Davletova / Maria Dmitrieva	21; 13	21; 9
5	(Thailand) (Russia)	Dechapol Puavaranukroh / Puttita Supajirakul; Rodion Alimov / Anastasia Ronzhina	21; 10	21; 10

=== South Africa vs Netherlands ===
South Africa
0
Stadium Sultan Abdul Halim Court 4
8 April 2014

Netherlands
5

			1	2	3
1	(South Africa) (Netherlands)	Bongani Von Bodenstein / Anri Schoonees; Ruben Jille / Imke van der Aar	13; 21	8; 21
2	(South Africa) (Netherlands)	Michael Jennings; Alex Vlaar	14; 21	23; 21	11; 21
3	(South Africa) (Netherlands)	Janke van der Vyver; Alida Chen	6; 21	11; 21
4	(South Africa) (Netherlands)	Michael Jennings / Bongani Von Bodenstein; Ruben Jille / Alex Vlaar	14; 21	14; 21
5	(South Africa) (Netherlands)	Anri Schoonees / Janke van der Vyver; Alida Chen / Imke van der Aar	21; 17	13; 21	14; 21

== Group X1 ==
Team	Pts	Pld	W	L	MF	MA
Indonesia	3	3	3	0	15	0
Germany	2	3	2	1	6	9
Canada	1	3	1	2	5	10
Sri Lanka	0	3	0	3	4	11

=== Indonesia vs Sri Lanka ===
Indonesia
5
Stadium Sultan Abdul Halim Court 1
7 April 2014

Sri Lanka
0

			1	2	3
1	(Indonesia) (Sri Lanka)	Anthony Sinisuka Ginting; Sachin Angodavidanalage	21; 10	21; 9
2	(Indonesia) (Sri Lanka)	Ruselli Hartawan; Kavindika Waduthantri	21; 10	21; 11
3	(Indonesia) (Sri Lanka)	Althof Baariq / Reinard Dhanriano; Sachin Angodavidanalage / Buwenaka Goonathileka	21; 18	14; 21	21; 10
4	(Indonesia) (Sri Lanka)	Apriani Rahayu / Jauza Fadhila Sugiarto; Kavindika Waduthantri / Ilmee Warangana	21; 16	21; 4
5	(Indonesia) (Sri Lanka)	Rafiddias Akhdan Nugroho / Zakia Ulfa; Buwenaka Goonathileka / Thilini Hendahewa	21; 17	21; 17

=== Germany vs Canada ===
Germany
3
Sultan Abdul Halim Court 2
7 April 2014

Canada
2

			1	2	3
1	(Germany) (Canada)	Max Weisskirchen / Eva Janssens; Ty Lindeman / Takeisha Wang	21; 16	21; 18
2	(Germany) (Canada)	David Peng; Jason Ho-Shue	21; 16	17; 21	18; 21
3	(Germany) (Canada)	Yvonne Li; Brittney Tam	21; 13	21; 14
4	(Germany) (Canada)	Bjarne Geiss / Daniel Seifert; Jason Ho-Shue / Jonathan Lai	16; 21	15; 21
5	(Germany) (Canada)	Luise Heim / Yvonne Li; Joanne Chen / Takeisha Wang	21; 17	17; 21	21; 12

=== Indonesia vs Canada ===
Indonesia
5
Stadium Sultan Abdul Halim Court 1
7 April 2014

Canada
0

			1	2	3
1	(Indonesia) (Canada)	Muhammad Rian Ardianto / Clinton Hendrik Kudamassa; Austin Bauer / Ty Lindeman	21; 13	21; 15
2	(Indonesia) (Canada)	Fitriani; Brittney Tam	21; 14	22; 20
3	(Indonesia) (Canada)	Muhammad Bayu Pangisthu; Jonathan Lai	21; 6	21; 6
4	(Indonesia) (Canada)	Sinta Arum Antasari / Rosyita Eka Putri Sari; Joanne Chen / Takeisha Wang	21; 13	21; 10
5	(Indonesia) (Canada)	Reinard Dhanriano / Nisak Puji Lestari; Jason Ho-Shue / Brittney Tam	16; 21	21; 13	21; 16

=== Germany vs Sri Lanka ===
Germany
3
Stadium Sultan Abdul Halim Court 2
7 April 2014

Sri Lanka
2

			1	2	3
1	(Germany) (Sri Lanka)	Max Weisskirchen; Sachin Angodavidanalage	11; 21	18; 21
2	(Germany) (Sri Lanka)	Luise Heim; Thilini Hendahewa	24; 22	21; 16
3	(Germany) (Sri Lanka)	Bjarne Geiss / Daniel Seifert; Sachin Angodavidanalage / Buwenaka Goonathileka	21; 18	17; 21	15; 21
4	(Germany) (Sri Lanka)	Luise Heim / Yvonne Li; Kavindika Wadunthantri / Ilmee Warangana	21; 12	21; 14
5	(Germany) (Sri Lanka)	Max Weisskirchen / Eva Janssens; Buwenaka Goonathileka / Thilini Hendahewa	19; 21	21; 10	21; 15

=== Indonesia vs Germany ===
Indonesia
5
Stadium Sultan Abdul Halim Court 1
8 April 2014

Germany
0

			1	2	3
1	(Indonesia) (Germany)	Reinard Dhanriano / Rosyita Eka Putri Sari; Max Weisskirchen / Eva Janssens	25; 23	21; 14
2	(Indonesia) (Germany)	Jonatan Christie; David Peng	21; 16	21; 16
3	(Indonesia) (Germany)	Ruselli Hartawan; Luise Heim	21; 17	21; 18
4	(Indonesia) (Germany)	Muhammad Rian Ardianto / Clinton Hendrik Kudamassa; Bjarne Geiss / Daniel Seifert	21; 11	21; 15
5	(Indonesia) (Germany)	Rosyita Eka Putri Sari / Apriani Rahayu; Luise Heim / Yvonne Li	21; 12	21; 12

=== Canada vs Sri Lanka ===
Canada
3
Stadium Sultan Abdul Halim Court 2
8 April 2014

Sri Lanka
2

			1	2	3
1	(Canada) (Sri Lanka)	Ty Lindeman / Takeisha Wang; Buwenaka Goonathileka / Thilini Hendahewa	19; 21	14; 21
2	(Canada) (Sri Lanka)	Jason Ho-Shue; Sachin Angodavidanalage	21; 13	15; 21	21; 10
3	(Canada) (Sri Lanka)	Brittney Tam; Thilini Hendahewa	8; 21	21; 17	21; 16
4	(Canada) (Sri Lanka)	Jason Ho-Shue / Jonathan Lai; Sachin Angodavidanalage / Buwenaka Goonathileka	18; 21	21; 14	16; 21
5	(Canada) (Sri Lanka)	Joanne Chen / Takeisha Wang; Kavindika Waduthantri / Ilmee Warangana	21; 10	21; 16

== Group X2 ==
Team	Pts	Pld	W	L	MF	MA
Hong Kong	4	4	4	0	20	0
Philippines	3	4	3	1	15	5
Bulgaria	2	4	2	2	8	12
Czech Republic	1	4	1	3	6	14
Macau	0	4	0	4	1	19

=== Bulgaria vs Czech Republic ===
Bulgaria
3
Stadium Sultan Abdul Halim Court 3
7 April 2014

Czech Republic
2

			1	2	3
1	(Bulgaria) (Czech Republic)	Dimitar Yanakiev / Maria Delcheva; Jan Somerlik / Monika Svetnickova	19; 21	23; 21	18; 21
2	(Bulgaria) (Czech Republic)	Vladimir Shishkov; Lukas Holub	21; 7	21; 8
3	(Bulgaria) (Czech Republic)	Maria Mitsova; Magdalena Lajdova	21; 16	21; 14
4	(Bulgaria) (Czech Republic)	Vladimir Shishkov / Dimitar Yanakiev; Lukas Holub / Jan Somerlik	23; 21	19; 21	21; 18
5	(Bulgaria) (Czech Republic)	Maria Delcheva / Maria Mitsova; Magdalena Lajdova / Monika Svetnickova	6; 21	16; 21

=== Macau vs Philippines ===
Macau
0
Stadium Sultan Abdul Halim Court 4
7 April 2014

Philippines
5

			1	2	3
1	(Macau) (Philippines)	Jason Lo King Ching / Kuan Chi Ling; Alvin Morada / Jessie Francisco	11; 21	5; 21
2	(Macau) (Philippines)	Lou Hok Man; Ros Pedrosa	12; 21	14; 21
3	(Macau) (Philippines)	Wong Kit Ieng; Airah Albo	8; 21	4; 21
4	(Macau) (Philippines)	Iek U Ieong / Lou Hok Man; Vincent Manuel / Alvin Morada	13; 21	12; 21
5	(Macau) (Philippines)	Kuan Chi Ling / Wong Kit Ieng; Jessie Francisco / Eleanor Inlayo	7; 21	9; 21

=== Hong Kong vs Czech Republic ===
Hong Kong
5
Stadium Sultan Abdul Halim Court 3
7 April 2014

Czech Republic
0

			1	2	3
1	(Hong Kong) (Czech Republic)	Yonny Chung / Ng Tsz Yau; Lukas Holub / Magdalena Lajdova	21; 10	21; 12
2	(Hong Kong) (Czech Republic)	Lee Cheuk Yiu; Jan Somerlik	21; 9	21; 8
3	(Hong Kong) (Czech Republic)	Ng Tsz Yau; Monika Svetnickova	21; 11	21; 10
4	(Hong Kong) (Czech Republic)	Yonny Chung / Yeung Shing Choi; Lukas Holub / Jan Somerlik	21; 13	21; 12
5	(Hong Kong) (Czech Republic)	Huang Wun Yan / Yeung Nga Ting; Magdalena Lajdova / Monika Svetnickova	21; 18	21; 11

=== Bulgaria vs Philippines ===
Bulgaria
0
Stadium Sultan Abdul Halim Court 4
7 April 2014

Philippines
5

			1	2	3
1	(Bulgaria) (Philippines)	Vladimir Shishkov / Maria Mitsova; Alvin Morada / Jessie Francisco	20; 22	9; 21
2	(Bulgaria) (Philippines)	Dimitar Yanakiev; Ros Pedrosa	15; 21	17; 21
3	(Bulgaria) (Philippines)	Maria Delcheva; Airah Albo	5; 21	10; 21
4	(Bulgaria) (Philippines)	Daniel Nikolov / Dimitar Yanakiev; Christian Bernardo / Alvin Morada	14; 21	19; 21
5	(Bulgaria) (Philippines)	Maria Delcheva / Maria Mitsova; Jessie Francisco / Eleanor Inlayo	11; 21	17; 21

=== Hong Kong vs Macau ===
Hong Kong
5
Stadium Sultan Abdul Halim Court 5
7 April 2014

Macau
0

			1	2	3
1	(Hong Kong) (Macau)	Fan Ka Yan; Wong Kit Ieng	21; 15	21; 13
2	(Hong Kong) (Macau)	Lee Chak Wai; Jason Lo King Ching	21; 8	21; 6
3	(Hong Kong) (Macau)	Huang Wun Yan / Yeung Nga Ting; Kuan Chi Ling / Wong Kit Ieng	21; 9	21; 9
4	(Hong Kong) (Macau)	Yonny Chung / Li Kuen Hon; Iek U Ieong / Lou Hok Man	0; 0			retired
5	(Hong Kong) (Macau)	Yeung Shing Choi / Wu Yi Ting; Iek U Ieong / Kuan Chi Ling	0; 0			retired

=== Hong Kong vs Philippines ===
Hong Kong
5
Stadium Sultan Abdul Halim Court 3
8 April 2014

Philippines
0

			1	2	3
1	(Hong Kong) (Philippines)	Yonny Chung / Ng Tsz Yau; Alvin Morada / Jessie Francisco	22; 24	21; 11	21; 16
2	(Hong Kong) (Philippines)	Lee Cheuk Yiu; Ros Pedrosa	21; 15	21; 8
3	(Hong Kong) (Philippines)	Yonny Chung / Yeung Shing Choi; Christian Bernardo / Alvin Morada	21; 15	21; 15
4	(Hong Kong) (Philippines)	Ng Tsz Yau; Airah Albo	21; 16	21; 10
5	(Hong Kong) (Philippines)	Huang Wun Yan / Yeung Nga Ting; Jessie Francisco / Eleanor Inlayo	21; 18	17; 21	21; 18

=== Bulgaria vs Macau ===
Bulgaria
5
Stadium Sultan Abdul Halim Court 4
8 April 2014

Macau
0

			1	2	3
1	(Bulgaria) (Macau)	Daniel Nikolov / Maria Delcheva; Lou Hok Man / Kuan Chi Ling	21; 16	22; 20
2	(Bulgaria) (Macau)	Vladimir Shishkov; Jason Lo King Ching	21; 13	21; 7
3	(Bulgaria) (Macau)	Maria Mitsova; Wong Kit Ieng	21; 14	21; 16
4	(Bulgaria) (Macau)	Daniel Nikolov / Vladimir Shishkov; Iek U Ieong / Lou Hok Man	21; 17	21; 18
5	(Bulgaria) (Macau)	Maria Delcheva / Maria Mitsova; Kuan Chi Ling / Wong Kit Ieng	21; 12	21; 17

=== Hong Kong vs Bulgaria ===
Hong Kong
5
Stadium Sultan Abdul Halim Court 1
8 April 2014

Bulgaria
0

			1	2	3
1	(Hong Kong) (Bulgaria)	Yeung Shing Choi / Wu Yi Ting; Dimitar Yanakiev / Maria Mitsova	21; 11	21; 14
2	(Hong Kong) (Bulgaria)	Lee Cheuk Yiu; Daniel Nikolov	21; 14	21; 8
3	(Hong Kong) (Bulgaria)	Fan Ka Yan; Maria Delcheva	21; 5	21; 14
4	(Hong Kong) (Bulgaria)	Lee Chak Wai / Li Kuen Hon; Daniel Nikolov / Dimitar Yanakiev	25; 23	21; 16
5	(Hong Kong) (Bulgaria)	Fan Ka Yan / Wu Yi Ting; Maria Delcheva / Maria Mitsova	26; 24	21; 15

=== Macau vs Czech Republic ===
Macau
1
Stadium Sultan Abdul Halim Court 2
8 April 2014

Czech Republic
4

			1	2	3
1	(Macau) (Czech Republic)	Lou Hok Man; Jan Somerlik	20; 22	21; 15	21; 15
2	(Macau) (Czech Republic)	Kuan Chi Ling; Monika Svetnickova	12; 21	14; 21
3	(Macau) (Czech Republic)	Iek U Ieong / Jason Lo King Ching; Lukas Holub / Jan Somerlik	20; 22	14; 21
4	(Macau) (Czech Republic)	Kuan Chi Ling / Wong Kit Ieng; Magdalena Lajdova / Monika Svetnickova	14; 21	19; 21
5	(Macau) (Czech Republic)	Lou Hok Man / Wong Kit Ieng; Lukas Holub / Magdalena Lajdova	17; 21	18; 21

=== Philippines vs Czech Republic ===
Philippines
5
Stadium Sultan Abdul Halim Court 1
8 April 2014

Czech Republic
0

			1	2	3
1	(Philippines) (Czech Republic)	Alvin Morada / Jessie Francisco; Lukas Holub / Monika Svetnickova	21; 13	21; 10
2	(Philippines) (Czech Republic)	Wilson Lopez II; Jan Somerlik	21; 12	21; 19
3	(Philippines) (Czech Republic)	Mariya Sevilla; Magdalena Lajdova	21; 8	21; 17
4	(Philippines) (Czech Republic)	Christian Bernardo / Vincent Manuel; Lukas Holub / Jan Somerlik	21; 17	21; 11
5	(Philippines) (Czech Republic)	Joella De Vera / Thea Marie Pomar; Magdalena Lajdova / Monika Svetnickova	21; 12	22; 20

== Group Y1 ==
Team	Pts	Pld	W	L	MF	MA
Japan	3	3	3	0	15	0
Spain	2	3	2	1	7	8
France	1	3	1	2	7	8
Armenia	0	3	0	3	1	14

=== Japan vs Spain ===
Japan
5
Stadium Sultan Abdul Halim Court 5
7 April 2014

Spain
0

			1	2	3
1	(Japan) (Spain)	Kenya Mitsuhashi / Chiharu Shida; Javier Suarez / Isabel Fernandez	21; 13	21; 15
2	(Japan) (Spain)	Minoru Koga; Enrique Penalver	21; 11	21; 17
3	(Japan) (Spain)	Aya Ohori; Clara Azurmendi	16; 21	21; 9	21; 7
4	(Japan) (Spain)	Masahide Nakata / Katsuki Tamate; Enrique Penalver / Javier Suarez	21; 13	21; 14
5	(Japan) (Spain)	Rira Kawashima / Saori Ozaki; Clara Azurmendi / Isabel Fernandez	21; 13	21; 13

=== France vs Armenia ===
France
5
Stadium Sultan Abdul Halim Court 6
7 April 2014

Armenia
0

			1	2	3
1	(France) (Armenia)	Thomas Vallez / Delphine Delrue; Zaven Mnatsakanyan / Knarik Margaryan	21; 4	21; 7
2	(France) (Armenia)	Tanguy Citron; Edgar Nazaretyan	21; 5	21; 8
3	(France) (Armenia)	Yaëlle Hoyaux; Lilit Poghosyan	21; 14	21; 14
4	(France) (Armenia)	Ronan Gueguin / Alexandre Hammer; Zaven Mnatsakanyan / Edgar Nazaretyan	21; 11	21; 8
5	(France) (Armenia)	Lole Courtois / Delphine Delrue; Knarik Margaryan / Lilit Poghosyan	21; 7	21; 9

=== Japan vs Armenia ===
Japan
5
Stadium Sultan Abdul Halim Court 3
7 April 2014

Armenia
0

			1	2	3
1	(Japan) (Armenia)	Minoru Koga / Wakana Nagahara; Zaven Mnatsakanyan / Knarik Margaryan	21; 1	21; 2
2	(Japan) (Armenia)	Kazuki Kirita; Edgar Nazaretyan	21; 3	21; 7
3	(Japan) (Armenia)	Aya Ohori; Lilit Poghosyan	21; 11	21; 5
4	(Japan) (Armenia)	Hashiru Shimono / Kanta Tsuneyama; Zaven Mnatsakanyan / Edgar Nazaretyan	21; 3	21; 8
5	(Japan) (Armenia)	Akane Araki / Chiharu Shida; Knarik Margaryan / Lilit Poghosyan	21; 4	21; 8

=== France vs Spain ===
France
2
Stadium Sultan Abdul Halim Court 4
7 April 2014

Spain
3

			1	2	3
1	(France) (Spain)	Alexandre Hammer / Delphine Delrue; Javier Suarez / Isabel Fernandez	21; 9	21; 8
2	(France) (Spain)	Tanguy Citron; Enrique Penalver	21; 14	19; 21	21; 17
3	(France) (Spain)	Yaëlle Hoyaux; Clara Azurmendi	12; 21	22; 20	10; 21
4	(France) (Spain)	Tanguy Citron / Thomas Vallez; Enrique Penalver / Javier Suarez	18; 21	23; 21	13; 21
5	(France) (Spain)	Lole Courtois / Delphine Delrue; Clara Azurmendi / Isabel Fernandez	18; 21	21; 17	18; 21

=== Japan vs France ===
Japan
5
Stadium Sultan Abdul Halim Court 5
8 April 2014

France
0

			1	2	3
1	(Japan) (France)	Yuta Watanabe / Arisa Higashino; Thomas Vallez / Delphine Delrue	21; 18	21; 15
2	(Japan) (France)	Kanta Tsuneyama; Alexandre Hammer	21; 8	21; 17
3	(Japan) (France)	Akane Yamaguchi; Yaëlle Hoyaux	21; 11	21; 11
4	(Japan) (France)	Kenya Mitsuhashi / Yuta Watanabe; Ronan Gueguin / Alexandre Hammer	21; 13	21; 9
5	(Japan) (France)	Wakana Nagahara / Chiharu Shida; Delphine Delrue / Yaëlle Hoyaux	21; 14	21; 11

=== Armenia vs Spain ===
Armenia
1
Stadium Sultan Abdul Halim Court 6
8 April 2014

Spain
4

			1	2	3
1	(Armenia) (Spain)	Zaven Mnatsakanyan / Knarik Margaryan; Javier Suarez / Sara Penalver	4; 21	6; 21
2	(Armenia) (Spain)	Edgar Nazaretyan; Vicent Riera	8; 21	10; 21
3	(Armenia) (Spain)	Lilit Poghosyan; Sara Penalver	21; 11	21; 10
4	(Armenia) (Spain)	Zaven Mnatsakanyan / Edgar Nazaretyan; Vicent Riera / Javier Suarez	14; 21	10; 21
5	(Armenia) (Spain)	Knarik Margaryan / Lilit Poghosyan; Clara Azurmendi / Isabel Fernandez	12; 21	13; 21

== Group Y2 ==
Team	Pts	Pld	W	L	MF	MA
Chinese Taipei	3	3	3	0	12	3
Denmark	2	3	2	1	10	5
England	1	3	1	2	8	7
Egypt	0	3	0	2	0	15

=== England vs Egypt ===
England
5
Stadium Sultan Abdul Halim Court 6
7 April 2014

Egypt
0

			1	2	3
1	(England) (Egypt)	Ben Lane / Jessica Pugh; Adham El Gamal / Naja Mohamed	21; 8	21; 3
2	(England) (Egypt)	Sean Vendy; Abdelrahman Abdelhakim	21; 9	21; 12
3	(England) (Egypt)	Ira Banerjee; Hany Doha	21; 7	21; 10
4	(England) (Egypt)	Matthew Clare / David King; Abdelrahman Abdelhakim / Adham El Gamal	21; 12	21; 14
5	(England) (Egypt)	Jessica Hopton / Lydia Powell; Hany Doha / Naja Mohamed	21; 12	21; 5

=== Denmark vs Egypt ===
Denmark
5
Stadium Sultan Abdul Halim Court 6
7 April 2014

Egypt
0

			1	2	3
1	(Denmark) (Egypt)	Alexander Bond / Ditte Soby Hansen; Abdelrahman Abdelhakim / Hany Doha	21; 8	21; 10
2	(Denmark) (Egypt)	Rasmus Gemke; Adham El Gamal	21; 9	21; 6
3	(Denmark) (Egypt)	Julie Dawall Jakobsen; Naja Mohamed	21; 7	21; 4
4	(Denmark) (Egypt)	Mathias Bay-Smidt / Frederik Sogaard Mortensen; Abdelrahman Abdelhakim / Adham El Gamal	21; 10	21; 12
5	(Denmark) (Egypt)	Sofie Holmboe Dahl / Sara Lundgaard; Hany Doha / Naja Mohamed	21; 8	21; 7

=== Chinese Taipei vs England ===
Chinese Taipei
4
Stadium Sultan Abdul Halim Court 6
7 April 2014

England
1

			1	2	3
1	(Chinese Taipei) (England)	Po Li-wei / Tsai Hsin-yu; Ben Lane / Jessica Pugh	10; 21	10; 21
2	(Chinese Taipei) (England)	Lai Yu-hua; Sean Vendy	21; 13	21; 10
3	(Chinese Taipei) (England)	Lee Chia-hsin; Ira Banerjee	21; 3	21; 11
4	(Chinese Taipei) (England)	Lee Chia-han / Wu Yuan-cheng; Ben Lane / Sean Vendy	21; 9	21; 18
5	(Chinese Taipei) (England)	Chang Ching-hui / Chang Hsin-tien; Ira Banerjee / Jessica Pugh	21; 16	22; 20

=== Chinese Taipei vs Egypt ===
Chinese Taipei
5
Stadium Sultan Abdul Halim Court 5
8 April 2014

Egypt
0

			1	2	3
1	(Chinese Taipei) (Egypt)	Lee Chia-han / Lee Chia-hsin; Adham El Gamal / Naja Mohamed	21; 2	21; 2
2	(Chinese Taipei) (Egypt)	Liou Wei-chi; Abdelrahman Abdelhakim	21; 8	21; 10
3	(Chinese Taipei) (Egypt)	Sung Shuo-yun; Hany Doha	21; 12	21; 12
4	(Chinese Taipei) (Egypt)	Po Li-wei / Yang Ming-tse; Abdelrahman Abdelhakim / Adham El Gamal	21; 10	21; 10
5	(Chinese Taipei) (Egypt)	Pan Tzu-chin / Tsai Hsin-yu; Hany Doha / Naja Mohamed	21; 3	22; 5

=== Denmark vs England ===
Denmark
3
Stadium Sultan Abdul Halim Court 6
8 April 2014

England
2

			1	2	3
1	(Denmark) (England)	Alexander Bond / Ditte Soby Hansen; Ben Lane / Jessica Pugh	18; 21	12; 21
2	(Denmark) (England)	Rasmus Gemke; David King	21; 8	21; 13
3	(Denmark) (England)	Mathias Bay-Smidt / Frederik Sogaard Mortensen; Ben Lane / Sean Vendy	20; 22	21; 9	21; 20
4	(Denmark) (England)	Mia Blichfeldt; Lydia Powell	21; 7	21; 19
5	(Denmark) (England)	Sofie Holmboe Dahl / Sara Lundgaard; Ira Banerjee / Jessica Pugh	21; 19	14; 21	15; 21

=== Chinese Taipei vs Denmark ===
Chinese Taipei
3
Stadium Sultan Abdul Halim Court 3
8 April 2014

Denmark
2

			1	2	3
1	(Chinese Taipei) (Denmark)	Lee Chia-han / Chang Hsin-tien; Alexander Bond / Ditte Soby Hansen	22; 20	21; 17
2	(Chinese Taipei) (Denmark)	Lai Yu-hua; Rasmus Gemke	17; 21	14; 21
3	(Chinese Taipei) (Denmark)	Po Li-wei / Yang Ming-tse; Mathias Bay-Smidt / Frederik Sogaard Mortensen	21; 18	15; 21	21; 12
4	(Chinese Taipei) (Denmark)	Lee Chia-hsin; Mia Blichfeldt	20; 22	18; 21
5	(Chinese Taipei) (Denmark)	Chang Ching-hui / Chang Hsin-tien; Sofie Holmboe Dahl / Sara Lundgaard	21; 15	21; 8

== Group Z1 ==
Team	Pts	Pld	W	L	MF	MA
China	3	3	3	0	15	0
Vietnam	2	3	2	1	10	5
United States	1	3	1	2	5	10
Slovenia	0	3	0	3	0	15

=== China vs Slovenia ===
China
5
Stadium Sultan Abdul Halim Court 7
7 April 2014

Slovenia
0

			1	2	3
1	(China) (Slovenia)	Zhao Junpeng; Miha Ivanič	21; 9	21; 8
2	(China) (Slovenia)	Chen Yufei; Katarina Beton	21; 10	21; 4
3	(China) (Slovenia)	Yao Zhidi / Zhao Jian; Miha Ivanič / Andraž Krapež	21; 11	21; 14
4	(China) (Slovenia)	Du Yue / Li Yinhui; Ema Cizelj / Lia Šalehar	21; 8	21; 7
5	(China) (Slovenia)	Huang Kaixiang / Chen Qingchen; Katarina Beton / Žan Laznik	21; 5	21; 12

=== Vietnam vs USA ===
Vietnam
5
Stadium Sultan Abdul Halim Court 8
7 April 2014

United States
0

			1	2	3
1	(Vietnam) (United States)	Đỗ Tuấn Đức / Phạm Hồng Nam; Kevin Chan / Jordy Supandi	21; 11	21; 17
2	(Vietnam) (United States)	Nguyễn Thùy Linh; Kerry Xu	14; 21	21; 10	21; 9
3	(Vietnam) (United States)	Phạm Cao Cường; Timothy Lam	21; 8	21; 11
4	(Vietnam) (United States)	Đỗ Thị Hoài / Đỗ Thị Phương Mai; Victoria Chen / Crystal Pan	23; 21	21; 18
5	(Vietnam) (United States)	Đỗ Tuấn Đức / Nguyễn Thùy Linh; Aston Khor / Anna Tang	21; 14	21; 13

=== China vs USA ===
China
5
Stadium Sultan Abdul Halim Court 7
8 April 2014

United States
0

			1	2	3
1	(China) (United States)	Huang Kaixiang / Zheng Siwei; Kevin Chan / Aston Khor	21; 10	21; 13
2	(China) (United States)	Qin Jinjing; Kerry Xu	21; 11	21; 16
3	(China) (United States)	Shi Yuqi; Jordy Supandi	21; 5	21; 19
4	(China) (United States)	Chen Qingchen / Jia Yifan; Victoria Chen / Crystal Pan	21; 10	21; 8
5	(China) (United States)	He Jiting / Jiang Binbin; Timothy Lam / Anna Tang	21; 13	21; 14

=== Vietnam vs Slovenia ===
Vietnam
5
Stadium Sultan Abdul Halim Court 8
8 April 2014

Slovenia
0

			1	2	3
1	(Vietnam) (Slovenia)	Đỗ Tuấn Đức / Nguyễn Thùy Linh; Andraž Krapež / Lia Šalehar	21; 18	16; 21	23; 21
2	(Vietnam) (Slovenia)	Phạm Cao Cường; Žan Laznik	21; 7	21; 17
3	(Vietnam) (Slovenia)	Đỗ Tuấn Đức / Phạm Hồng Nam; Miha Ivanič / Andraž Krapež	21; 16	21; 10
4	(Vietnam) (Slovenia)	Nguyễn Thùy Linh; Katarina Beton	21; 9	21; 10
5	(Vietnam) (Slovenia)	Đỗ Thị Hoài / Đỗ Thị Phương Mai; Ema Cizelj / Lia Šalehar	22; 20	14; 21	21; 6

=== China vs Vietnam ===
China
5
Stadium Sultan Abdul Halim Court 4
8 April 2014

Vietnam
0

			1	2	3
1	(China) (Vietnam)	Huang Kaixiang / Chen Qingchen; Võ Bảo Thiện / Đỗ Thị Hoài	21; 9	21; 8
2	(China) (Vietnam)	Lin Guipu; Đỗ Tuấn Đức	21; 17	21; 18
3	(China) (Vietnam)	He Bingjiao; Nguyễn Thùy Linh	21; 6	21; 15
4	(China) (Vietnam)	Huang Kaixiang / Zheng Siwei; Đỗ Tuấn Đức / Phạm Hồng Nam	21; 16	21; 9
5	(China) (Vietnam)	Du Yue / Li Yinhui; Đỗ Thị Hoài / Đỗ Thị Phương Mai	21; 6	21; 18

=== USA vs Slovenia ===
United States
5
Stadium Sultan Abdul Halim Court 6
8 April 2014

Slovenia
0

			1	2	3
1	(United States) (Slovenia)	Aston Khor / Anna Tang; Miha Ivanič / Ema Cizelj	21; 14	19; 21	21; 16
2	(United States) (Slovenia)	Timothy Lam; Andraž Krapež	21; 11	21; 6
3	(United States) (Slovenia)	Crystal Pan; Katarina Beton	21; 17	17; 21	21; 13
4	(United States) (Slovenia)	Kevin Chan / Aston Khor; Miha Ivanič / Andraž Krapež	21; 13	15; 21	21; 18
5	(United States) (Slovenia)	Victoria Chen / Crystal Pan; Ema Cizelj / Lia Šalehar	21; 15	21; 19

== Group Z2 ==
Team	Pts	Pld	W	L	MF	MA
Malaysia	3	3	3	0	13	2
India	2	3	2	1	10	5
Australia	1	3	1	2	7	8
Uzbekistan	0	3	0	3	0	15

=== India vs Australia ===
India
3
Stadium Sultan Abdul Halim Court 7
7 April 2014

Australia
2

			1	2	3
1	(India) (Australia)	Chirag Sen / Kuhoo Garg; Daniel Guda / Khoo Lee Yen	11; 21	21; 13	20; 22
2	(India) (Australia)	Ruthvika Shivani Gadde; Alice Wu	21; 9	21; 19
3	(India) (Australia)	Harsheel Dani; Daniel Guda	14; 21	21; 9	21; 14
4	(India) (Australia)	Vaishnavi Iyer / Reshma Karthik; Khoo Lee Yen / Joy Lai	18; 21	15; 21
5	(India) (Australia)	Arjun M.R. / Chirag Shetty; Anthony Joe / Simon Leung	21; 14	21; 13

=== Malaysia vs Australia ===
Malaysia
5
Stadium Sultan Abdul Halim Court 7
7 April 2014

Australia
0

			1	2	3
1	(Malaysia) (Australia)	Chua Khek Wei / Ng Di Hua; Simon Leung / Tang Huaidong	21; 17	21; 9
2	(Malaysia) (Australia)	Ho Yen Mei; Joy Lai	26; 24	21; 12
3	(Malaysia) (Australia)	Cheam June Wei; Anthony Joe	21; 7	21; 9
4	(Malaysia) (Australia)	Goh Yea Ching / Peck Yen Wei; Jennifer Tam / Alice Wu	21; 14	21; 14
5	(Malaysia) (Australia)	Ooi Zi Heng / Yap Zhen; Simon Leung / Khoo Lee Yen	13; 21	21; 11	21; 11

=== Malaysia vs Uzbekistan ===
Malaysia
5
Stadium Sultan Abdul Halim Court 7
7 April 2014

Uzbekistan
0

			1	2	3
1	(Malaysia) (Uzbekistan)	Ameer Amri Zainuddin / Eng Pui Yee; Abdurasul Khodjaev / Anait Khurshudyan	21; 2	21; 10
2	(Malaysia) (Uzbekistan)	Satheistharan Ramachandran; Amrullo Bakhshullaev	21; 11	21; 6
3	(Malaysia) (Uzbekistan)	Lee Ying Ying; Mariya Pakina	21; 11	21; 4
4	(Malaysia) (Uzbekistan)	Goh Sze Fei / Tan Jinn Hwa; Amrullo Bakhshullaev / Abdurasul Khodjaev	21; 11	21; 4
5	(Malaysia) (Uzbekistan)	Raja Nunina Raja Azlan Shah / Yap Zhen; Anait Khurshudyan / Mariya Pakina	21; 5	21; 8

=== India vs Uzbekistan ===
India
5
Stadium Sultan Abdul Halim Court 8
8 April 2014

Uzbekistan
0

			1	2	3
1	(India) (Uzbekistan)	Bagalur Rajanna Sankeerth / Mira Mahadevan; Abdurasul Khodjaev / Anait Khurshudyan	21; 8	21; 13
2	(India) (Uzbekistan)	Talar Laa; Amrullo Bakhshullaev	21; 11	21; 8
3	(India) (Uzbekistan)	Reshma Karthik; Mariya Pakina	21; 5	21; 13
4	(India) (Uzbekistan)	Chirag Sen / Saurabh Sharma; Amrullo Bakhshullaev / Abdurasul Khodjaev	21; 9	21; 11
5	(India) (Uzbekistan)	Farha Mather / Korampath Parutholi Sruthi; Anait Khurshudyan / Mariya Pakina	21; 8	21; 13

=== Malaysia vs India ===
Malaysia
3
Stadium Sultan Abdul Halim Court 5
8 April 2014

India
2

			1	2	3
1	(Malaysia) (India)	Tan Jinn Hwa / Goh Yea Ching; Chirag Sen / Kuhoo Garg	21; 16	21; 16
2	(Malaysia) (India)	Cheam June Wei; Harsheel Dani	21; 19	16; 21	21; 15
3	(Malaysia) (India)	Ho Yen Mei; Ruthvika Shivani Gadde	11; 21	12; 21
4	(Malaysia) (India)	Chua Khek Wei / Ooi Zi Heng; Arjun M.R. / Chirag Shetty	21; 17	16; 21	10; 21
5	(Malaysia) (India)	Goh Yea Ching / Peck Yen Wei; Vaishnavi Iyer / Reshma Karthik	21; 18	21; 11

=== Uzbekistan vs Australia ===
Uzbekistan
0
Stadium Sultan Abdul Halim Court 6
8 April 2014

Australia
5

			1	2	3
1	(Uzbekistan) (Australia)	Abdurasul Khodjaev / Anait Khurshudyan; Daniel Guda / Khoo Lee Yen	16; 21	7; 21
2	(Uzbekistan) (Australia)	Amrullo Bakhshullaev; Anthony Joe	6; 21	12; 21
3	(Uzbekistan) (Australia)	Mariya Pakina; Alice Wu	19; 21	17; 21
4	(Uzbekistan) (Australia)	Amrullo Bakhshullaev / Abdurasul Khodjaev; Anthony Joe / Simon Leung	17; 21	6; 21
5	(Uzbekistan) (Australia)	Anait Khurshudyan / Mariya Pakina; Joy Lai / Alice Wu	9; 21	17; 21
