= Arih =

Arih is a surname. Notable people with the surname include:

- Igor Arih (born 1964), businessman
- Nika Arih (born 1998), Slovenian badminton player
