= Vlaar =

Vlaar is a surname. Notable people with the surname include:

- Ron Vlaar (born 1985), Dutch footballer
- Alex Vlaar (born 1996), Bulgarian badminton player
