= Yvonne Li =

German badminton player (born 1998)

Yvonne Li 李怡逢
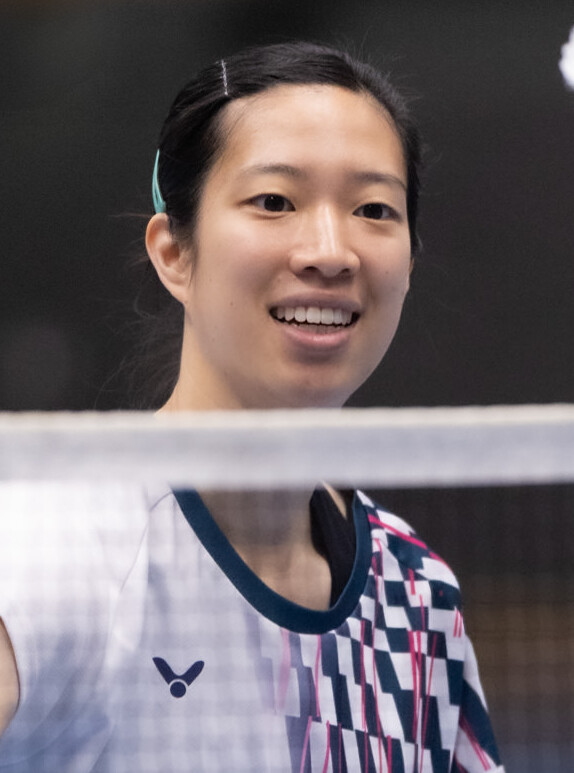
- Li in 2025

Personal information
- Born: 30 May 1998 (age 28) Hamburg, Germany
- Years active: 2012–present
- Height: 1.71 m (5 ft 7 in)

Sport
- Country: Germany
- Sport: Badminton
- Handedness: Right

Women's singles
- Highest ranking: 21 (WS, 18 July 2023)
- Current ranking: 46 (WS, 10 November 2026)
- BWF profile
Medal record
Women's badminton
Representing Germany
European Mixed Team Championships
Silver medal – second place	2019 Copenhagen	Mixed team
Bronze medal – third place	2015 Leuven	Mixed team
Bronze medal – third place	2017 Lubin	Mixed team
Bronze medal – third place	2021 Vantaa	Mixed team
Bronze medal – third place	2023 Aire-sur-la-Lys	Mixed team
Bronze medal – third place	2025 Baku	Mixed team
European Women's Team Championships
Silver medal – second place	2018 Kazan	Women's team
Silver medal – second place	2020 Liévin	Women's team
Bronze medal – third place	2014 Basel	Women's team
Bronze medal – third place	2016 Kazan	Women's team
European Junior Championships
Bronze medal – third place	2013 Ankara	Mixed team
Bronze medal – third place	2015 Lubin	Girls' doubles
Bronze medal – third place	2017 Mulhouse	Girls' singles

Yvonne Li (born 30 May 1998) is a German badminton player. She won bronze medals at the 2015 and 2017 European Junior Championships in the girls' doubles and singles respectively. Li who affiliate with SC Union 08 Lüdinghausen was the seven-time National Champion in the women's singles winning 7 titles in 8 years between 2019 to 2026, and she won the women's doubles in 2020 & 2026. She also took the German National mixed doubles title in 2024 with Matthias Kicklitz.

== Achievements ==
=== European Junior Championships ===
Girls' singles
Year	Venue	Opponent	Score	Result
2017	Centre Sportif Régional d'Alsace; Mulhouse, France	(Denmark) Julie Dawall Jakobsen	17–21, 21–13, 11–21	Bronze

Girls' doubles
Year	Venue	Partner	Opponent	Score	Result
2015	Regional Sport Centrum Hall; Lubin, Poland	(Germany) Eva Janssens	(Denmark) Julie Dawall Jakobsen (Denmark) Ditte Søby Hansen	19–21, 11–21	Bronze

=== BWF World Tour (1 runner-up) ===
The BWF World Tour, which was announced on 19 March 2017 and implemented in 2018, is a series of elite badminton tournaments sanctioned by the Badminton World Federation (BWF). The BWF World Tours are divided into levels of World Tour Finals, Super 1000, Super 750, Super 500, Super 300 (part of the HSBC World Tour), and the BWF Tour Super 100.

Women's singles
Year	Tournament	Level	Opponent	Score	Result
2020	SaarLorLux Open	Super 100	(Scotland) Kirsty Gilmour	10–21, 17–21	(silver) Runner-up

=== BWF International Challenge/Series (6 titles, 8 runners-up) ===
Women's singles
Year	Tournament	Opponent	Score	Result
2015	Lithuanian International	(Belarus) Alesia Zaitsava	21–14, 21–14	(gold) Winner
2015	Eurasia Bulgaria International	(Denmark) Natalia Koch Rohde	15–21, 19–21	(silver) Runner-up
2016	Dutch International	(Denmark) Mette Poulsen	21–18, 21–18	(gold) Winner
2018	Czech Open	(Turkey) Neslihan Yiğit	21–17, 21–8	(gold) Winner
2018	Italian International	(Denmark) Julie Dawall Jakobsen	17–21, 17–21	(silver) Runner-up
2019	Polish Open	(China) Wei Yaxin	8–21, 21–19, 20–22	(silver) Runner-up
2022	Welsh International	(Belgium) Lianne Tan	21–17, 21–12	(gold) Winner
2025	Irish Open	(South Korea) Kim Ga-ram	15–21, 21–18, 9–21	(silver) Runner-up
2026	Denmark Challenge	(Denmark) Amalie Schulz	14–21, 21–13, 21–18	(gold) Winner
2026	Valence Alpes International	(France) Anna Tatranova	16–21, 19–21	(silver) Runner-up
2026	Dutch Open	(India) Aakarshi Kashyap	21–9, 21–6	(gold) Winner
2026	Irish Open	(South Korea) Kim Min-ji	14–21, 13–21	(silver) Runner-up

Women's doubles
Year	Tournament	Partner	Opponent	Score	Result
2015	Lithuanian International	(Germany) Luise Heim	(France) Marie Batomene (France) Teshana Vignes Waran	11–21, 7–21	(silver) Runner-up

Mixed doubles
Year	Tournament	Partner	Opponent	Score	Result
2013	Bulgarian Eurasia Open	(Germany) Marvin Seidel	(Finland) Anton Kaisti (Bulgaria) Gabriela Stoeva	21–19, 9–21, 18–21	(silver) Runner-up

BWF International Challenge tournament
BWF International Series tournament
BWF Future Series tournament

=== BWF Junior International ===
Girls' singles
Year	Tournament	Opponent	Score	Result
2013	Belgian Junior	(England) Ira Banerjee	21–9, 21–12	(gold) Winner
2013	Croatian Junior International	(Germany) Luise Heim	20–22, 17–21	(silver) Runner-up
2014	Belgian Junior	(Scotland) Holly Newall	11–9, 11–5, 11–7	(gold) Winner

Girls' doubles
Year	Tournament	Partner	Opponent	Score	Result
2014	Spanish Junior International	(Russia) Vitaliya Chigintseva	(Spain) Clara Azurmendi (Spain) Isabel Fernandez	21–13, 16–21, 16–21	(silver) Runner-up
2014	Belgian Junior	(Germany) Eva Janssens	(Scotland) Julie MacPherson (Scotland) Holly Newall	10–11, 11–8, 11–5, 11–9	(gold) Winner

Mixed doubles
Year	Tournament	Partner	Opponent	Score	Result
2013	Bulgarian Junior International	(Germany) Marvin Seidel	(Germany) Johannes Pistorius (Germany) Luise Heim	16–21, 21–15, 21–14	(gold) Winner
2013	Croatian Junior International	(Germany) Marvin Seidel	(Czech Republic) Jiri Louda (Czech Republic) Magdalena Lajdova	21–13, 21–14	(gold) Winner
2013	Portuguese International Junior	(Germany) David Peng	(Germany) Max Weisskirchen (Germany) Luise Heim	21–13, 17–21, 14–21	(silver) Runner-up
2014	Belgian Junior	(Germany) Bjarne Geiss	(India) Arjun Matathil Ramachandran (India) Kuhoo Garg	7–11, 7–11, 10–11	(silver) Runner-up

BWF Junior International Grand Prix tournament
BWF Junior International Challenge tournament
BWF Junior International Series tournament
BWF Junior Future Series tournament
