= Sanyam Shukla =

Indian badminton player (born 1996)

Personal information
- Born: 19 April 1996 (age 30)

Sport
- Country: India
- Sport: Badminton

Men's & mixed doubles
- Highest ranking: 51 (MD 13 September 2018); 204 (XD 29 January 2015)
- BWF profile
Medal record
Men's badminton
Representing India
South Asian Games
Gold medal – first place	2019 Kathmandu-Pokhara	Men's team

Sanyam Shukla (born 19 April 1996) is an Indian badminton player who plays for Chhattisgarh badminton team. In 2015, he won the Mauritius International tournament in the men's doubles event partnered with Ramchandran Shlok. Shukla was part of the national men's team member that won the gold medal in 2019 South Asian Games.

== Achievements ==
=== BWF International Challenge/Series (4 titles, 4 runners-up) ===
Men's doubles
Year	Tournament	Partner	Opponent	Score	Result
2014	Tata India International	(India) Ramchandran Shlok	(India) Manu Attri (India) B. Sumeeth Reddy	15–21, 15–21	(silver) Runner-up
2015	Mauritius International	(India) Ramchandran Shlok	(South Africa) Andries Malan (South Africa) Willem Viljoen	21–19, 21–12	(gold) Winner
2017	Bulgarian International	(India) Arun George	(Slovenia) Miha Ivanič (Slovenia) Andraž Krapež	21–18, 21–13	(gold) Winner
2017	India International Series	(India) Arun George	(India) Alwin Francis (India) Nandagopal Kidambi	21–19, 21–15	(gold) Winner
2018	Dutch International	(India) Arun George	(Russia) Nikita Khakimov (Russia) Andrey Parakhodin	21–19, 21–19	(gold) Winner
2019	Maldives International	(India) Arun George	(Japan) Keiichiro Matsui (Japan) Yoshinori Takeuchi	9–21, 20–22	(silver) Runner-up
2021	India International Challenge	(India) Arun George	(India) Krishna Prasad Garaga (India) Vishnu Vardhan Goud Panjala	22–24, 21–13, 20–22	(silver) Runner-up

Mixed doubles
Year	Tournament	Partner	Opponent	Score	Result
2017	Bulgarian International	(India) Ahillya Harjani	(Austria) Dominik Stipsits (Austria) Antonia Meinke	16–21, 5–21	(silver) Runner-up

BWF International Challenge tournament
BWF International Series tournament
BWF Future Series tournament
