= Ronan Guéguin =

French badminton player (born 1996)

Personal information
- Born: 19 July 1996 (age 30)

Sport
- Country: France
- Sport: Badminton

Men's singles & doubles
- Highest ranking: 396 (MS 20 August 2015); 136 (MD 28 April 2016); 500 (XD 28 April 2016)
- BWF profile
Medal record
Men's badminton
Representing France
European Men's Team Championships
Silver medal – second place	2016 Kazan	Men's team
European Junior Championships
Bronze medal – third place	2015 Lubin	Mixed team

Ronan Guéguin (born 19 July 1996) is a French badminton player.

== Achievements ==
=== BWF International Challenge/Series ===
Men's doubles
Year	Tournament	Partner	Opponent	Score	Result
2014	Bulgarian Eurasia Open	(France) Alexandre Hammer	(France) Toma Junior Popov (France) Thomas Vallez	10–11, 10–11, 9–11	(silver) Runner-up

BWF International Challenge tournament
BWF International Series tournament
BWF Future Series tournament
