= Alexander Bond =

Danish badminton player (born 1996)

Personal information
- Born: Alexander Spanggaard Bond; 18 June 1996 (age 30)

Sport
- Country: Denmark
- Sport: Badminton

Men's & mixed doubles
- Highest ranking: 98 (MD 3 September 2015); 122 (XD 3 September 2015)
- BWF profile
Medal record
Men's badminton
Representing Denmark
European Junior Championships
| Gold medal – first place | 2015 Lubin | Boys' doubles |
| Bronze medal – third place | 2015 Lubin | Mixed team |

Alexander Spanggaard Bond (born 18 June 1996) is a Danish badminton player. He was the boys' doubles gold medalist at the 2015 European Junior Championships partnered with Joel Eipe.

== Achievements ==
=== European Junior Championships ===
Boys' doubles
| Year | Venue | Partner | Opponent | Score | Result |
|---|---|---|---|---|---|
| 2015 | Regional Sport Centrum Hall; Lubin, Poland | (Denmark) Joel Eipe | (England) Ben Lane (England) Sean Vendy | 21–15, 22–24, 21–16 | Gold |

=== BWF International Challenge/Series ===
Men's doubles
| Year | Tournament | Partner | Opponent | Score | Result |
|---|---|---|---|---|---|
| 2013 | Norwegian International | (Denmark) Mathias Weber Estrup | (Russia) Nikita Khakimov (Russia) Vasily Kuznetsov | 21–23, 15–21 | (silver) Runner-up |
| 2016 | Dutch International | (Denmark) Joel Eipe | (Denmark) Frederik Aalestrup (Denmark) Mathias Moldt Baskjær | 17–21, 21–17, 21–14 | (gold) Winner |

Mixed doubles
| Year | Tournament | Partner | Opponent | Score | Result |
|---|---|---|---|---|---|
| 2014 | Iceland International | (Denmark) Ditte Søby Hansen | (Denmark) Nicklas Mathiasen (Denmark) Cecilie Bjergen | 21–9, 21–13 | (gold) Winner |
| 2015 | Croatian International | (Denmark) Ditte Søby Hansen | (Croatia) Zvonimir Đurkinjak (Croatia) Matea Čiča | 17–21, 13–21 | (silver) Runner-up |
| 2015 | Eurasia Bulgaria International | (Denmark) Ditte Søby Hansen | (Vietnam) Đỗ Tuấn Đức (Vietnam) Phạm Như Thảo | Walkover | (silver) Runner-up |
| 2016 | Dutch International | (Denmark) Ditte Søby Hansen | (England) Ben Lane (England) Jessica Pugh | 19–21, 23–21, 21–18 | (gold) Winner |
| 2016 | Belgian International | (Denmark) Ditte Søby Hansen | (France) Ronan Labar (France) Audrey Fontaine | 19–21, 14–21 | (silver) Runner-up |

BWF International Challenge tournament
BWF International Series tournament
BWF Future Series tournament
