= Joanna Chaube =

French badminton player (born 1997)

Personal information
- Born: 25 September 1997 (age 29)

Sport
- Country: France
- Sport: Badminton

Women's singles & doubles
- Highest ranking: 285 (WS 12 March 2015); 416 (WD 10 March 2016); 355 (XD 23 October 2014)
- BWF profile
Medal record
Women's badminton
Representing France
European Junior Championships
| Bronze medal – third place | 2015 Lubin | Mixed team |

Joanna Chaube (born 25 September 1997) is a French badminton player.

== Achievements ==
=== BWF International Challenge/Series ===
Mixed doubles
| Year | Tournament | Partner | Opponent | Score | Result |
|---|---|---|---|---|---|
| 2014 | Bulgarian Eurasia Open | (France) Alexandre Hammer | (Bulgaria) Stiliyan Makarski (Switzerland) Céline Tripet | 7–11, 11–8, 11–10, 11–9 | (gold) Winner |

BWF International Challenge tournament
BWF International Series tournament
BWF Future Series tournament
