= Miha Ivanič =

Slovenian badminton player (born 1998)

Personal information
- Born: 22 May 1998 (age 28)
- Height: 1.90 m (6 ft 3 in)
- Weight: 90 kg (198 lb)

Sport
- Country: Slovenia
- Sport: Badminton

Men's singles & doubles
- Highest ranking: 138 (MS 10 May 2018); 113 (MD 21 December 2017); 150 (XD 30 March 2017)
- BWF profile
Medal record
Men's badminton
Representing Slovenia
European Junior Championships
Bronze medal – third place	2017 Mulhouse	Mixed doubles

Miha Ivanič (born 22 May 1998) is a Slovenian badminton player. He started his career in badminton when he was in the elementary school, and trained at the Medvode club. Partnered with Nika Arih, he won a bronze medal at the 2017 European Junior Championships in the mixed doubles event. He competed at the 2018 Mediterranean Games and 2019 European Games.

== Achievements ==
=== European Junior Championships ===
Mixed doubles
Year	Venue	Partner	Opponent	Score	Result
2017	Centre Sportif Régional d'Alsace; Mulhouse, France	(Slovenia) Nika Arih	(Russia) Rodion Alimov (Russia) Alina Davletova	13–21, 15–21	Bronze

=== BWF International Challenge/Series (1 title, 5 runners-up) ===
Men's singles
Year	Tournament	Opponent	Score	Result
2017	Hatzor International	(Poland) Krzysztof Jakowczuk	11–21, 21–8, 21–10	(gold) Winner
2018	Hatzor International	(India) Kaushal Dharmamer	10–21, 21–14, 18–21	(silver) Runner-up

Men's doubles
Year	Tournament	Partner	Opponent	Score	Result
2017	Slovak Open	(Slovenia) Andraž Krapež	(Ukraine) Ivan Druzchenko (Ukraine) Vladislav Druzchenko	17–21, 21–17, 14–21	(silver) Runner-up
2017	Bulgarian International	(Slovenia) Andraž Krapež	(India) Arun George (India) Sanyam Shukla	18–21, 13–21	(silver) Runner-up
2020	Bulgarian International	(Slovenia) Gasper Krivec	(Bulgaria) Daniel Nikolov (Bulgaria) Ivan Rusev	9–21, 14–21	(silver) Runner-up

Mixed doubles
Year	Tournament	Partner	Opponent	Score	Result
2016	Slovak Open	(Slovenia) Nika Arih	(Czech Republic) Jakub Bitman (Czech Republic) Alžběta Bášová	10–12, 4–11, 6–11	(silver) Runner-up

Commonwealth Youth Games tournament
BWF International Series tournament
BWF Future Series tournament
