= Sara Lundgaard =

Danish badminton player (born 1997)

Personal information
- Born: 26 June 1997 (age 29) Hillerød, Denmark
- Height: 1.63 m (5 ft 4 in)

Sport
- Country: Denmark
- Sport: Badminton
- Handedness: Right

Women's & mixed doubles
- Highest ranking: 49 (WD 1 November 2018); 37 (XD 27 September 2022)
- BWF profile
Medal record
Women's badminton
Representing Denmark
European Junior Championships
Silver medal – second place	2015 Lubin	Mixed doubles
Bronze medal – third place	2015 Lubin	Mixed team

Sara Lundgaard (born 26 June 1997) is a Danish badminton player. Lundagaard started her junior career at the Lillerød club, and she moved to Værløse. In 2015, she won the silver medal at the European Junior Championships in the mixed doubles event.

== Personal life ==
Lundgarg is a daughter of the former Danish national badminton player, and two times All England Open champion, Martin Lundgaard Hansen. She educated at the Hillerød Business School, and in 2016, she received a scholarship to study Chinese language in Taiwan.

== Achievements ==
=== European Junior Championships ===
Mixed doubles
Year	Venue	Partner	Opponent	Score	Result
2015	Regional Sport Centrum Hall; Lubin, Poland	(Denmark) Frederik Søgaard	(Germany) Max Weißkirchen (Germany) Eva Janssens	21–19, 12–21, 18–21	Silver

=== BWF International Challenge/Series ===
Women's doubles
Year	Tournament	Partner	Opponent	Score	Result
2017	Norwegian International	(Denmark) Alexandra Bøje	(Denmark) Isabella Nielsen (Denmark) Claudia Paredes	21–19, 21–9	(gold) Winner
2017	Italian International	(Denmark) Alexandra Bøje	(Russia) Ekaterina Bolotova (Russia) Alina Davletova	18–21, 11–21	(silver) Runner-up

Mixed doubles
Year	Tournament	Partner	Opponent	Score	Result
2016	Slovenia International	(Denmark) Steve Olesen	(Denmark) Mikkel Mikkelsen (Denmark) Mai Surrow	9–21, 14–21	(silver) Runner-up
2018	Austrian International	(Denmark) Lasse Mølhede	(Russia) Evgenij Dremin (Russia) Evgenia Dimova	15–21, 13–21	(silver) Runner-up
2020	Austrian Open	(Denmark) Jeppe Bay	(Finland) Anton Kaisti (Czech Republic) Alžběta Bášová	21–16, 21–13	(gold) Winner
2021	Denmark Masters	(Denmark) Jeppe Bay	(Denmark) Niclas Nøhr (Denmark) Amalie Magelund	21–15, 21–14	(gold) Winner

BWF International Challenge tournament
BWF International Series tournament
BWF Future Series tournament
