= 2015 European Junior Badminton Championships =

Tournament details
- Dates: 26 March – 4 April 2015
- Venue: Hala RCS (Regional Sport Centrum Hall)
- Location: Lubin, Lower Silesian Voivodeship, Poland

The 2015 European Junior Badminton Championships were held at the Regional Sport Centrum Hall in Lubin, Poland, between 26 March and 4 April 2015.

== Medalists ==
Event	Gold	Silver	Bronze
Men's singles	(Denmark) Anders Antonsen	(Germany) Max Weißkirchen	(France) Toma Junior Popov
Men's singles	(Denmark) Anders Antonsen	(Germany) Max Weißkirchen	(Turkey) Muhammed Ali Kurt
Women's singles	(Denmark) Mia Blichfeldt	(Denmark) Julie Dawall Jakobsen	(Germany) Luise Heim
Women's singles	(Denmark) Mia Blichfeldt	(Denmark) Julie Dawall Jakobsen	(Turkey) Aliye Demirbağ
Men's doubles	(Denmark) Alexander Bond (Denmark) Joel Eipe	(England) Ben Lane (England) Sean Vendy	(Denmark) Mathias Bay-Smidt (Denmark) Frederik Søgaard
Men's doubles	(Denmark) Alexander Bond (Denmark) Joel Eipe	(England) Ben Lane (England) Sean Vendy	(Scotland) Adam Hall (Scotland) Alexander Dunn
Women's doubles	(Denmark) Julie Dawall Jakobsen (Denmark) Ditte Søby Hansen	(France) Verlaine Faulmann (France) Anne Tran	(Estonia) Kristin Kuuba (Estonia) Helina Rüütel
Women's doubles	(Denmark) Julie Dawall Jakobsen (Denmark) Ditte Søby Hansen	(France) Verlaine Faulmann (France) Anne Tran	(Germany) Eva Janssens (Germany) Yvonne Li
Mixed doubles	(Germany) Max Weißkirchen (Germany) Eva Janssens	(Denmark) Frederik Søgaard (Denmark) Sara Lundgaard	(England) Ben Lane (England) Jessica Pugh
Mixed doubles	(Germany) Max Weißkirchen (Germany) Eva Janssens	(Denmark) Frederik Søgaard (Denmark) Sara Lundgaard	(France) Alexandre Hammer (France) Anne Tran
Teams	Spain; Victor Alcaide; Alex Nogueira Castro; Manuel Brea Filloy; Alejo Javier Ibeas; Luís Enrique Peñalver; Vicent Riera; Pablo Sanmartin; Javier Suárez; Miren Josebe Azcue; Clara Azurmendi; Isabel Fernández; Claudia Leal; Marta Molina; Eva Murio; Diaz Nerea; Sara Peñalver Pereira	England; Matthew Clare; James Farmer; David Jones; Ben Lane; Sean Vendy; Ira Banerjee; Jessica Hopton; Lydia Jane Powell; Ngan Miu Lin; Jessica Pugh	Denmark; Anders Antonsen; Mathias Bay-Smidt; Alexander Bond; Joel Eipe; Rasmus Gemke; Ditlev Jaeger Holm; Frederik Søgaard; Irina Amalie Andersen; Mia Blichfeldt; Julie Dawall Jakobsen; Sara Lundgaard; Ditte Søby Hansen; Marie Louise Steffensen
Teams	Spain; Victor Alcaide; Alex Nogueira Castro; Manuel Brea Filloy; Alejo Javier Ibeas; Luís Enrique Peñalver; Vicent Riera; Pablo Sanmartin; Javier Suárez; Miren Josebe Azcue; Clara Azurmendi; Isabel Fernández; Claudia Leal; Marta Molina; Eva Murio; Diaz Nerea; Sara Peñalver Pereira	England; Matthew Clare; James Farmer; David Jones; Ben Lane; Sean Vendy; Ira Banerjee; Jessica Hopton; Lydia Jane Powell; Ngan Miu Lin; Jessica Pugh	France; Tanguy Citron; Gregor Dunikowski; Thom Gicquel; Ronan Guéguin; Alexandre Hammer; Vincent Medina; Jimmy Noblecourt; Toma Junior Popov; Thomas Vallez; Emilie Beaujean; Joanna Chaube; Lole Courtois; Delphine Delrue; Verlaine Faulmann; Vimala Hériau; Yaelle Hoyaux; Margot Lambert; Anne Tran

== Medal table ==
Rank	Nation	Gold	Silver	Bronze	Total
1	Denmark (DEN)	4	2	2	8
2	Germany (GER)	1	1	2	4
3	Spain (ESP)	1	0	0	1
4	England (ENG)	0	2	1	3
5	France (FRA)	0	1	3	4
6	Turkey (TUR)	0	0	2	2
7	Estonia (EST)	0	0	1	1
7	Scotland (SCO)	0	0	1	1
Totals (8 entries)		6	6	12	24
