= Luise Heim =

German badminton player (born 1996)

Personal information
- Born: 24 March 1996 (age 30) Bad Dürkheim, Germany
- Years active: 2011
- Height: 1.74 m (5 ft 9 in)

Sport
- Country: Germany
- Sport: Badminton
- Handedness: Right

Women's singles
- Highest ranking: 53 (23 November 2017)
- BWF profile
Medal record
Women's badminton
Representing Germany
European Mixed Team Championships
| Silver medal – second place | 2019 Copenhagen | Mixed team |
| Bronze medal – third place | 2015 Leuven | Mixed team |
| Bronze medal – third place | 2017 Lubin | Mixed team |
European Women's Team Championships
| Silver medal – second place | 2018 Kazan | Women's team |
| Bronze medal – third place | 2014 Basel | Women's team |
| Bronze medal – third place | 2016 Kazan | Women's team |
European Junior Championships
| Bronze medal – third place | 2013 Ankara | Mixed team |
| Bronze medal – third place | 2015 Lubin | Girls' singles |

Luise Heim (born 24 March 1996) is a German badminton player who affiliate with 1. BC Beuel. She competed at the 2014 Summer Youth Olympics in Nanjing, China. Heim was the bronze medalists at the 2015 European Junior Championships in the girls' singles and mixed team event.

== Achievements ==
=== European Junior Championships ===
Girls' singles
| Year | Venue | Opponent | Score | Result |
|---|---|---|---|---|
| 2015 | Regional Sport Centrum Hall; Lubin, Poland | (Denmark) Mia Blichfeldt | 10–21, 19–21 | Bronze |

=== BWF International Challenge/Series (1 title, 4 runners-up) ===
Women's singles
| Year | Tournament | Opponent | Score | Result |
|---|---|---|---|---|
| 2016 | Hellas Open | (Germany) Fabienne Deprez | 4–16 retired | (silver) Runner-up |
| 2017 | Dutch International | (Denmark) Irina Amalie Andersen | 21–18, 22–24, 18–21 | (silver) Runner-up |
| 2017 | Bulgarian Open | (Turkey) Neslihan Yiğit | 17–21, 21–14, 17–21 | (silver) Runner-up |
| 2018 | Hellas Open | (Hungary) Laura Sárosi | 21–9, 21–11 | (gold) Winner |

Women's doubles
| Year | Tournament | Partner | Opponent | Score | Result |
|---|---|---|---|---|---|
| 2015 | Lithuanian International | (Germany) Yvonne Li | (France) Marie Batomene (France) Teshana Vignes Waran | 11–21, 7–21 | (silver) Runner-up |

BWF International Challenge tournament
BWF International Series tournament
BWF Future Series tournament
