= Ditte Søby Hansen =

Danish badminton player (born 1997)

Personal information
- Born: 3 February 1997 (age 29) Glostrup, Denmark
- Height: 1.69 m (5 ft 7 in)

Sport
- Country: Denmark
- Sport: Badminton
- Handedness: Right

Women's & mixed doubles
- Highest ranking: 82 (WD 20 April 2017); 78 (XD 12 January 2017)
- BWF profile
Medal record
Women's badminton
Representing Denmark
European Junior Championships
Gold medal – first place	2015 Lubin	Girls' doubles
Bronze medal – third place	2015 Lubin	Mixed team

Ditte Søby Hansen (born 3 February 1997) is a Danish badminton player. She won gold medal at the 2015 European Junior Championships in the girls' doubles.

== Achievements ==
=== European Junior Championships ===
Girls' doubles
Year	Venue	Partner	Opponent	Score	Result
2015	Regional Sport Centrum Hall; Lubin, Poland	(Denmark) Julie Dawall Jakobsen	(France) Verlaine Faulmann (France) Anne Tran	21–18, 21–19	Gold

=== BWF International Challenge/Series ===
Women's doubles
Year	Tournament	Partner	Opponent	Score	Result
2015	Croatian International	(Denmark) Julie Finne-Ipsen	(Denmark) Maiken Fruergaard (Denmark) Camilla Martens	16–21, 21–19, 19–21	(silver) Runner-up

Mixed doubles
Year	Tournament	Partner	Opponent	Score	Result
2014	Iceland International	(Denmark) Alexander Bond	(Denmark) Nicklas Mathiasen (Denmark) Cecilie Bjergen	21–9, 21–13	(gold) Winner
2015	Croatian International	(Denmark) Alexander Bond	(Croatia) Zvonimir Đurkinjak (Croatia) Matea Čiča	17–21, 13–21	(silver) Runner-up
2015	Eurasia Bulgaria International	(Denmark) Alexander Bond	(Vietnam) Đỗ Tuấn Đức (Vietnam) Phạm Như Thảo	Walkover	(silver) Runner-up
2016	Dutch International	(Denmark) Alexander Bond	(England) Ben Lane (England) Jessica Pugh	19–21, 23–21, 21–18	(gold) Winner
2016	Belgian International	(Denmark) Alexander Bond	(France) Ronan Labar (France) Audrey Fontaine	19–21, 14–21	(silver) Runner-up
2018	Czech Open	(Denmark) Jeppe Bay	(France) Ronan Labar (France) Audrey Fontaine	10–21, 21–12, 13–21	(silver) Runner-up

BWF International Challenge tournament
BWF International Series tournament
BWF Future Series tournament
