= Alexandre Hammer =

French badminton player (born 1996)

Personal information
- Born: 26 May 1996 (age 30)

Sport
- Country: France
- Sport: Badminton

Men's singles & doubles
- Highest ranking: 459 (MS 8 January 2015); 156 (MD 26 February 2015); 355 (XD 23 October 2014)
- BWF profile
Medal record
Men's badminton
Representing France
European Junior Championships
Bronze medal – third place	2015 Lubin	Mixed doubles
Bronze medal – third place	2015 Lubin	Mixed team

Alexandre Hammer (born 26 May 1996) is a French badminton player. In 2015, he won bronze medal at the European Junior Championships in mixed doubles event with his partner Anne Tran.

== Achievements ==
=== European Junior Championships ===
Mixed doubles
Year	Venue	Partner	Opponent	Score	Result
2015	Regional Sport Centrum Hall; Lubin, Poland	(France) Anne Tran	(Germany) Max Weißkirchen (Germany) Eva Janssens	19–21, 12–21	Bronze

=== BWF International Challenge/Series ===
Men's doubles
Year	Tournament	Partner	Opponent	Score	Result
2014	Bulgarian Eurasia Open	(France) Ronan Guéguin	(France) Toma Junior Popov (France) Thomas Vallez	10–11, 10–11, 9–11	(silver) Runner-up

Mixed doubles
Year	Tournament	Partner	Opponent	Score	Result
2014	Bulgarian Eurasia Open	(France) Joanna Chaube	(Bulgaria) Stiliyan Makarski (Switzerland) Céline Tripet	7–11, 11–8, 11–10, 11–9	(gold) Winner

BWF International Challenge tournament
BWF International Series tournament
BWF Future Series tournament
