= Thomas Vallez =

French badminton player (born 1996)

Personal information
- Born: 2 February 1996 (age 30)
- Height: 1.85 m (6 ft 1 in)

Sport
- Country: France
- Sport: Badminton

Men's singles & doubles
- Highest ranking: 747 (MS 6 November 2014); 136 (MD 28 April 2016); 195 (XD 18 August 2016)
- BWF profile
Medal record
Men's badminton
Representing France
European Men's Team Championships
Silver medal – second place	2016 Kazan	Men's team
European Junior Championships
Bronze medal – third place	2015 Lubin	Mixed team

Thomas Vallez (born 2 February 1996) is a French badminton player.

== Achievements ==
=== BWF International Challenge/Series ===
Men's doubles
Year	Tournament	Partner	Opponent	Score	Result
2014	Bulgarian Eurasia Open	(France) Toma Junior Popov	(France) Ronan Guéguin (France) Alexandre Hammer	11–10, 11–10, 11–9	(gold) Winner

BWF International Challenge tournament
BWF International Series tournament
BWF Future Series tournament
