= Alex Vlaar =

Dutch-Bulgarian badminton player

Personal information
- Born: Alex Christiaan Vlaar; 31 July 1996 (age 30) Lelystad, Flevoland, Netherlands

Sport
- Country: Netherlands
- Sport: Badminton

Men's singles & doubles
- Highest ranking: 197 (MS 12 July 2018); 70 (MD 13 August 2019); 56 (XD 1 October 2019)
- BWF profile

Alex Christiaan Vlaar (Bulgarian: Алекс Флаар; born 31 July 1996) is a Dutch-Bulgarian badminton player. He was born in Lelystad, the Netherlands. His father Chris Vlaar is a Dutch rally car driver and badminton coach, his mother is former badminton player Emilia Dimitrova who is also a coach. She played for Bulgaria at the 1992 Olympics women's doubles.

== Career ==
Born in the Netherlands, Vlaar is a former young Dutch badminton player who first played for the Netherlands team. He participated for the Netherlands at the 2014 BWF World Junior Championships, 2014 Youth Olympic Games in Nanjing, China, and the 2015 European Junior Championships in Lubin, Poland. Overall top 10 BWF junior ranking in all, he won several European Ranked Junior tournaments as well in singles, doubles and mixed doubles. In the Netherlands he won several national junior and open titles. He plays team competition at the highest premier Dutch club level (Eredivisie), first for BV Almere and now already a few years with Velo badminton from Wateringen with whom he became Dutch team champion in 2016 & 2017.

Vlaar has a double Nationality (Dutch and Bulgarian) and he decided to played on a Bulgarian license to develop his badminton on the highest professional international level. Already in 2016 he became Bulgarian National senior champion in men's doubles with partner Philip Shishov and mixed doubles with partner Petya Nedelcheva. In 2017, he and Shishov successfully defended the National men's doubles title. Alex was selected for the National team of Bulgaria and together with Bulgarian mixed doubles partner Mariya Mitsova he already was runner-up at the 2016 Croatian International, and won the 2018 Bulgarian Open and the 2018 Bulgarian International.

== Achievements ==
=== BWF International Challenge/Series (5 titles, 4 runners-up) ===
Men's doubles
| Year | Tournament | Partner | Opponent | Score | Result |
|---|---|---|---|---|---|
| 2016 | Bulgaria International | (Bulgaria) Philip Shishov | (Thailand) Pakin Kuna-Anuvit (Thailand) Natthapat Trinkajee | 19–21, 19–21 | (silver) Runner-up |
| 2018 | Bulgarian International | (Bulgaria) Ivan Rusev | (Czech Republic) Jaromír Janáček (Czech Republic) Tomáš Švejda | 19–21, 14–21 | (silver) Runner-up |
| 2022 | Spanish International | (Netherlands) Noah Haase | (Spain) Joan Monroy (Spain) Carlos Piris | 21–18, 21–17 | (gold) Winner |

Mixed doubles
| Year | Tournament | Partner | Opponent | Score | Result |
|---|---|---|---|---|---|
| 2016 | Croatian International | (Bulgaria) Mariya Mitsova | (Croatia) Zvonimir Durkinjak (Croatia) Mateja Čiča | 18–21, 11–21 | (silver) Runner-up |
| 2017 | Bulgarian Open | (Netherlands) Iris Tabeling | (Denmark) Mathias Thyrri (Denmark) Emilie Aalestrup | 23–21, 21–15 | (gold) Winner |
| 2018 | Bulgarian Open | (Bulgaria) Mariya Mitsova | (Finland) Anton Kaisti (Finland) Inalotta Suutarinen | 21–17, 17–21, 21–16 | (gold) Winner |
| 2018 | Bulgarian International | (Bulgaria) Mariya Mitsova | (India) Ashith Surya (India) Pranjal Prabhu Chimulkar | 21–15, 21–10 | (gold) Winner |
| 2019 | Portugal International | (Bulgaria) Mariya Mitsova | (Chinese Taipei) Chang Ko-chi (Chinese Taipei) Lee Chih-chen | 12–21, 14–21 | (silver) Runner-up |
| 2019 | Hellas International | (Bulgaria) Mariya Mitsova | (Poland) Miłosz Bochat (Poland) Magdalena Świerczyńska | 10–21, 23–21, 21–17 | (gold) Winner |

BWF International Challenge tournament
BWF International Series tournament
BWF Future Series tournament
