= Nika Arih =

Slovenian badminton player (born 1998)

Personal information
- Born: 19 October 1998 (age 28)

Sport
- Country: Slovenia
- Sport: Badminton

Women's singles & doubles
- Highest ranking: 424 (WS 16 March 2017); 96 (WD with Lia Šalehar 15 November 2022); 150 (XD with Miha Ivanič 30 March 2017)
- BWF profile
Medal record
Women's badminton
Representing Slovenia
European Junior Championships
Bronze medal – third place	2017 Mulhouse	Mixed doubles

Nika Arih (born 19 October 1998) is a Slovenian badminton player.

== Achievements ==
=== European Junior Championships ===
Mixed doubles
Year	Venue	Partner	Opponent	Score	Result
2017	Centre Sportif Régional d'Alsace; Mulhouse, France	(Slovenia) Miha Ivanič	(Russia) Rodion Alimov (Russia) Alina Davletova	13–21, 15–21	Bronze

=== BWF International Challenge/Series (3 runners-up) ===
Women's doubles
Year	Tournament	Partner	Opponent	Score	Result
2015	Slovak Open	(Slovenia) Petra Polanc	(Netherlands) Gayle Mahulette (Netherlands) Cheryl Seinen	13–21, 16–21	(silver) Runner-up
2021	Slovenia Future Series	(Slovenia) Lia Šalehar	(Russia) Viktoriia Kozyreva (Russia) Mariia Sukhova	10–21, 21–14, 17–21	(silver) Runner-up

Mixed doubles
Year	Tournament	Partner	Opponent	Score	Result
2016	Slovak Open	(Slovenia) Miha Ivanič	(Czech Republic) Jakub Bitman (Czech Republic) Alžběta Bášová	10–12, 4–11, 6–11	(silver) Runner-up

BWF International Challenge tournament
BWF International Series tournament
BWF Future Series tournament
