= Bulgarian International Championship =

Annual badminton competition

The Bulgarian International Championship is an international badminton tournament held in Bulgaria since 2006. This tournament also known as Bulgarian Hebar Open or Bulgarian Eurasia Open. The 2014 tournament used the best of five games 11 points scoring system. Another badminton tournament in Bulgaria with the higher level known as Bulgarian Open.

== Previous winners ==
Year	Men's singles	Women's singles	Men's doubles	Women's doubles	Mixed doubles	Notes	Ref
2006	(Denmark) Kasper Ødum	(Bulgaria) Petya Nedelcheva	(Denmark) Mathias Boe (Denmark) Joachim Fischer Nielsen	(Indonesia) Meiliana Jauhari (Indonesia) Purwati	(Russia) Aleksandr Nikolaenko (Russia) Nina Vislova	IBF Grand Prix	
2007	No competition						
2008	(Denmark) Joachim Persson	(Bulgaria) Petya Nedelcheva	(Denmark) Mathias Boe (Denmark) Carsten Mogensen	(India) Jwala Gutta (India) Shruti Kurien	(India) Valiyaveetil Diju (India) Jwala Gutta	BWF Grand Prix	
2009– 2011	No competition						
2012	(Malaysia) Tan Chun Seang	(Belarus) Alesia Zaitsava	(Malaysia) Tan Chun Seang (Austria) Roman Zirnwald	(Bulgaria) Gabriela Stoeva (Bulgaria) Stefani Stoeva	(Austria) Roman Zirnwald (Austria) Elisabeth Baldauf	BWF International Series	
2013	(Poland) Michał Rogalski	(Bulgaria) Stefani Stoeva	(Scotland) Martin Campbell (Scotland) Patrick MacHugh	(Bulgaria) Petya Nedelcheva (Bulgaria) Dimitria Popstoikova	(Finland) Anton Kaisti (Bulgaria) Gabriela Stoeva	BWF International Series	
2014	(Estonia) Raul Must	(Bulgaria) Petya Nedelcheva	(France) Toma Junior Popov (France) Thomas Vallez	(Turkey) Özge Bayrak (Turkey) Neslihan Yiğit	(France) Alexandre Hammer (France) Joanna Chaube	BWF International Series	
2015	(Estonia) Raul Must	(Denmark) Natalia Koch Rohde	(France) Jordan Corvée (France) Julien Maio	(Vietnam) Lê Thu Huyền (Vietnam) Phạm Như Thảo	(Vietnam) Đỗ Tuấn Đức (Vietnam) Phạm Như Thảo	BWF International Series	
2016	(Bulgaria) Daniel Nikolov	(England) Panuga Riou	(Bulgaria) Daniel Nikolov (Bulgaria) Ivan Rusev	(Turkey) Büşra Yalçınkaya (Turkey) Fatma Nur Yavuz	(Turkey) Melih Turgut (Turkey) Fatma Nur Yavuz	BWF Future Series	
2017	(India) R. M. V. Gurusaidutt	(Bulgaria) Mariya Mitsova	(India) Arun George (India) Sanyam Shukla	(Belgium) Lise Jaques (Belgium) Flore Vandenhoucke	(Austria) Dominik Stipsits (Austria) Antonia Meinke	BWF Future Series	
2018	(Sweden) Albin Carl Hjelm	(Spain) Sara Peñalver	(Czech Republic) Jaromír Janáček (Czech Republic) Tomáš Švejda	(Sweden) Moa Sjöö (Sweden) Tilda Sjöö	(Bulgaria) Alex Vlaar (Bulgaria) Mariya Mitsova	BWF Future Series	
2019	(Bulgaria) Dimitar Yanakiev	(Sweden) Rebecca Kuhl	(Austria) Philip Birker (Austria) Dominik Stipsits	(Austria) Serena Au Yeong (Austria) Katharina Hochmeir	(Bulgaria) Stilian Makarski (Bulgaria) Diana Dimova	BWF Future Series	
2020	(Croatia) Luka Ban	(Bulgaria) Linda Zetchiri	(Bulgaria) Daniel Nikolov (Bulgaria) Ivan Rusev	(Bulgaria) Gabriela Stoeva (Bulgaria) Stefani Stoeva	(Bulgaria) Iliyan Stoynov (Bulgaria) Hristomira Popovska	BWF Future Series	
2021	(India) Meiraba Maisnam	(India) Samiya Imad Farooqui	(England) Avinash Gupta (England) Brandon Yap	(Denmark) Amalie Cecilie Kudsk (Denmark) Signe Schulz	(Denmark) Kristian Kræmer (Denmark) Amalie Cecilie Kudsk	BWF Future Series	
2022	(Chinese Taipei) Wang Po-wei	(Chinese Taipei) Lin Sih-yun	(Chinese Taipei) Chiang Chien-wei (Chinese Taipei) Wu Hsuan-yi	(Chinese Taipei) Liu Chiao-yun (Chinese Taipei) Wang Yu-qiao	(Chinese Taipei) Chiu Hsiang-chieh (Chinese Taipei) Lin Xiao-min	BWF Future Series	
2023	(Poland) Mikolaj Szymanowski	(Bulgaria) Kaloyana Nalbantova	(Poland) Robert Cybulski (Poland) Szymon Ślepecki	(Poland) Paulina Hankiewicz (Poland) Kornelia Marczak	(Poland) Robert Cybulski (Poland) Kornelia Marczak	BWF Future Series	
2024	(Sweden) Gustav Bjorkler	(Bulgaria) Stefani Stoeva	(Portugal) Bruno Carvalho (Portugal) David Silva	(Bulgaria) Gabriela Stoeva (Bulgaria) Stefani Stoeva	(Norway) Jonas Østhassel (Norway) Julie Abusdal	BWF Future Series	
2025	(Bulgaria) Dimitar Yanakiev	(Turkey) Zehra Erdem	(Poland) Adrian Krawczyk (Poland) Szymon Ślepecki	(Czech Republic) Kateřina Osladilová (Czech Republic) Sharleen van Coppenolle	(Serbia) Andrija Doder (Serbia) Sara Lončar	BWF Future Series	
2026	(Denmark) Christopher Vittoriani	(Ukraine) Maria Koriagina	(Serbia) Andrija Doder (Serbia) Sergej Lukic	(Ukraine) Maria Koriagina (Ukraine) Yaroslava Vantsarovska	(Lithuania) Rokas Lesinskas (Ukraine) Yaroslava Vantsarovska	BWF Future Series	

== Performances by countries ==
As of the 2026 edition

Pos	Country	MS	WS	MD	WD	XD	Total
1	Bulgaria*	3	8	2	4	3.5	20.5
2	Denmark	3	1	2	1	1	8
3	India	2	1	1	1	1	6
3	Poland	2	0	2	1	1	6
5	Chinese Taipei	1	1	1	1	1	5
6	Austria	0	0	1.5	1	2	4.5
7	Sweden	2	1	0	1	0	4
7	Turkey	0	1	0	2	1	4
9	France	0	0	2	0	1	3
10	Ukraine	0	1	0	1	0.5	2.5
11	Czech Republic	0	0	1	1	0	2
11	England	0	1	1	0	0	2
11	Estonia	2	0	0	0	0	2
11	Serbia	0	0	1	0	1	2
11	Vietnam	0	0	0	1	1	2
16	Malaysia	1	0	0.5	0	0	1.5
17	Belarus	0	1	0	0	0	1
17	Belgium	0	0	0	1	0	1
17	Croatia	1	0	0	0	0	1
17	Indonesia	0	0	0	1	0	1
17	Norway	0	0	0	0	1	1
17	Portugal	0	0	1	0	0	1
17	Russia	0	0	0	0	1	1
17	Scotland	0	0	1	0	0	1
17	Spain	0	1	0	0	0	1
26	Finland	0	0	0	0	0.5	0.5
26	Lithuania	0	0	0	0	0.5	0.5
Total		17	17	17	17	17	85

* Host nation
