= 2018 BWF International Challenge =

The 2018 BWF International Challenge was the twelfth season of the BWF International Challenge.

== Schedule ==
Below is the schedule released by Badminton World Federation:

| Tour | Official title | Venue | City | Date | | Prize money USD | Prospectus | Report |
| Tour | Official title | Venue | City | Start | Finish | Prize money USD | Prospectus | Report |
|---|---|---|---|---|---|---|---|---|
| 1 | The 27th Iran Fajr International Challenge 2018 | Enghelab Sport Complex | Zanjan | February 5 | February 8 | 25,000 | | Report |
| 2 | (Austria) Austrian Open 2018 | Wiener Stadthalle | Vienna | February 21 | February 24 | 25,000 | | Report |
| 3 | 33rd Brazil International Badminton Cup 2018 | Costa Cavalcante | Foz do Iguaçu | March 7 | March 11 | 25,000 | | Report |
| 4 | CIPUTRA HANOI - YONEX SUNRISE Vietnam International Challenge 2018 | Tay Ho District Stadium | Hanoi | March 20 | March 25 | 25,000 | | Report |
| ~~5~~ | ~~(Poland) Polish Open 2018~~ | ~~TBC~~ | ~~TBC~~ | ~~March 22~~ | ~~March 25~~ | ~~TBC~~ | | ~~Report~~ |
| 6 | (Japan) YONEX Osaka International Challenge Badminton Championships 2018 | Moriguchi City Gymnasium | Moriguchi, Osaka | April 4 | April 8 | 25,000 | | Report |
| 7 | (Finland) Finnish Open 2018 | Energia Areena | Vantaa | April 5 | April 8 | 25,000 | | Report |
| 8 | CELCOM AXIATA Malaysia International Challenge 2018 | Juara Stadium | Kuala Lumpur | April 17 | April 22 | 25,000 | | Report |
| 9 | (Spain) IBERDROLA Spanish International Villa de Madrid 2018 | Polideportivo Municipal | Madrid | June 14 | June 17 | 25,000 | | Report |
| 10 | (Russia) White Nights 2018 | Sports Hall Arena | Gatchina | July 4 | July 8 | 25,000 | | Report |
| 11 | (Nigeria) Lagos International 2018 | Okoya Thomas Hall Teslim Balogun Stadium | Surulere | July 18 | July 21 | 20,000 | | Report |
| 12 | (Ukraine) RSL Kharkiv International 2018 | Lokomotiv Sports Palace | Kharkiv | August 29 | September 2 | 25,000 | | Report |
| 13 | (Belgium) YONEX Belgian International 2018 | Sportoase | Leuven | September 12 | September 15 | 25,000 | | Report |
| 14 | South Australia International 2018 | TBC | Adelaide | September 13 | September 16 | 25,000 | | Report |
| 15 | (Czech Republic) LI NING Czech Open 2018 | TBC | Brno | September 27 | September 30 | 25,000 | | Report |
| 16 | Indonesia International Challenge 2018 | TBC | TBC | October 23 | October 28 | 25,000 | | Report |
| 17 | (Hungary) 43rd YONEX Hungarian International Championships 2018 | Budaörs Sportshall | Budaörs | November 1 | November 4 | 25,000 | | Report |
| 18 | (United Arab Emirates) Dubai International Challenge 2018 | TBC | Dubai | November 14 | November 18 | 25,000 | | Report |
| 19 | Tata Open India International Challenge 2018 | TBC | Mumbai | November 27 | December 2 | 25,000 | | Report |
| 20 | YONEX - SUNRISE Bangladesh International Challenge 2018 | TBC | Dhaka | December 11 | December 16 | 25,000 | | Report |
| 21 | (Italy) YONEX Italian International 2018 | TBC | Milan | December 13 | December 16 | 25,000 | | Report |
| 22 | (United States) 2018 YONEX/K&D GRAPHICS International Challenge | TBC | Orange County | December 18 | December 22 | 25,000 | | Report |

== Results ==
=== Winners ===
| Tour | Men's singles | Women's singles | Men's doubles | Women's doubles | Mixed doubles |
|---|---|---|---|---|---|
| Iran | (Vietnam) Phạm Cao Cường | (Malaysia) Thinaah Muralitharan | (India) Alwin Francis (India) Nandagopal Kidambi | (Iran) Setayesh Abdolkarimi (Iran) Haleh Hamedanchi | —N/a |
| Austria | (India) Kashyap Parupalli | (Denmark) Anna Thea Madsen | (Chinese Taipei) Lu Chen (Chinese Taipei) Ye Hong-wei | (Japan) Chisato Hoshi (Japan) Kie Nakanishi | (Russia) Evgenij Dremin (Russia) Evgenia Dimova |
| Brazil | (Brazil) Ygor Coelho de Oliveira | (Canada) Rachel Honderich | (Canada) Jason Ho-shue (Canada) Nyl Yakura | (Canada) Rachel Honderich (United States) Jamie Subandhi | (Russia) Evgenij Dremin (Russia) Evgenia Dimova |
| Vietnam | (Japan) Kento Momota | (Indonesia) Dinar Dyah Ayustine | (Thailand) Maneepong Jongjit (Thailand) Nanthakarn Yordphaisong | (South Korea) Baek Ha-na (South Korea) Lee Yu-rim | (Vietnam) Đỗ Tuấn Đức (Vietnam) Phạm Như Thảo |
| Poland | cancelled | | | | |
| Japan | (Japan) Yu Igarashi | (Japan) Ayumi Mine | (Japan) Hirokatsu Hashimoto (Japan) Hiroyuki Saeki | (Japan) Naoko Fukuman (Japan) Kurumi Yonao | (South Korea) Kim Won-ho (South Korea) Lee Yu-rim |
| Finland | (Malaysia) Leong Jun Hao | (Indonesia) Gregoria Mariska Tunjung | (Indonesia) Akbar Bintang Cahyono (Indonesia) Muhammad Reza Pahlevi Isfahani | (Japan) Asumi Kugo (Japan) Megumi Yokoyama | (Indonesia) Alfian Eko Prasetya (Indonesia) Marsheilla Gischa Islami |
| Malaysia | (Chinese Taipei) Hsueh Hsuan-yi | (China) Wang Zhiyi | (Indonesia) Mohammad Ahsan (Indonesia) Hendra Setiawan | (Malaysia) Soong Fie Cho (Malaysia) Tee Jing Yi | (Malaysia) Chen Tang Jie (Malaysia) Peck Yen Wei |
| Spain | (France) Toma Junior Popov | (Denmark) Michelle Skødstrup | (Denmark) Frederik Colberg (Denmark) Joachim Fischer Nielsen | (France) Delphine Delrue (France) Léa Palermo | (Russia) Evgenij Dremin (Russia) Evgenia Dimova |
| Russia | (Spain) Pablo Abián | (Hong Kong) Deng Xuan | (Germany) Bjarne Geiss (Germany) Jan Colin Völker | (Japan) Akane Araki (Japan) Riko Imai | (Russia) Rodion Alimov (Russia) Alina Davletova |
| Nigeria | (Israel) Misha Zilberman | (Israel) Ksenia Polikarpova | (India) Manu Attri (India) B. Sumeeth Reddy | (India) Kuhoo Garg (India) Riya Mookerjee | (India) Manu Attri (India) K. Maneesha |
| Ukraine | (Czech Republic) Jan Louda | (Turkey) Özge Bayrak | (India) Krishna Prasad Garaga (India) Dhruv Kapila | (Sweden) Amanda Högström (Sweden) Clara Nistad | (India) Saurabh Sharma (India) Anoushka Parikh |
| Belgium | (England) Toby Penty | (Chinese Taipei) Lin Ying-chun | (Netherlands) Jacco Arends (Netherlands) Ruben Jille | (France) Delphine Delrue (France) Léa Palermo | (Netherlands) Jacco Arends (Netherlands) Selena Piek |
| Australia | (Japan) Yu Igarashi | (Japan) Natsuki Oie | (Japan) Akira Koga (Japan) Taichi Saito | (Japan) Erina Honda (Japan) Nozomi Shimizu | (Singapore) Terry Hee Yong Kai (Singapore) Citra Putri Sari Dewi |
| Czech Republic | (France) Toma Junior Popov | (Germany) Yvonne Li | (France) Thom Gicquel (France) Ronan Labar | (England) Chloe Birch (England) Lauren Smith | (France) Ronan Labar (France) Audrey Mittelheisser |
| Indonesia | (Indonesia) Chico Aura Dwi Wardoyo | (Japan) Shiori Saito | (Indonesia) Sabar Karyaman Gutama (Indonesia) Frenky Wijaya Putra | (Indonesia) Tania Oktaviani Kusumah (Indonesia) Vania Arianti Sukoco | (Japan) Kohei Gondo (Japan) Ayane Kurihara |
| Hungary | (Denmark) Rasmus Messerschmidt | (Turkey) Neslihan Yiğit | (Denmark) David Daugaard (Denmark) Frederik Søgaard | (Russia) Ekaterina Bolotova (Russia) Alina Davletova | (Denmark) Joel Eipe (Denmark) Mette Poulsen |
| United Arab Emirates | (Russia) Vladimir Malkov | (India) Ashmita Chaliha | (South Korea) Kim Sang-soo (South Korea) Yoo Yeon-seong | (South Korea) Go Ah-ra (South Korea) Yoo Chae-ran | (South Korea) Yoo Yeon-seong (South Korea) Park So-young |
| India | (India) Lakshya Sen | (India) Ashmita Chaliha | (India) Arjun M.R. (India) B. Sumeeth Reddy | (Hong Kong) Ng Wing Yung (Hong Kong) Yeung Nga Ting | (Thailand) Nipitphon Phuangphupet (Thailand) Savitree Amitrapai |
| Bangladesh | (Malaysia) Soo Teck Zhi | (Vietnam) Nguyễn Thùy Linh | (Indonesia) Leo Rolly Carnando (Indonesia) Daniel Marthin | (Malaysia) Vivian Hoo Kah Mun (Malaysia) Yap Cheng Wen | (Indonesia) Leo Rolly Carnando (Indonesia) Indah Cahya Sari Jamil |
| Italy | (Denmark) Victor Svendsen | (Denmark) Julie Dawall Jakobsen | (Denmark) Mathias Bay-Smidt (Denmark) Lasse Mølhede | (Russia) Ekaterina Bolotova (Russia) Alina Davletova | (Russia) Rodion Alimov (Russia) Alina Davletova |
| United States | (Japan) Koki Watanabe | (Japan) Aya Ohori | (Chinese Taipei) Lu Chia-hung (Chinese Taipei) Lu Chia-pin | (Canada) Rachel Honderich (Canada) Kristen Tsai | (Japan) Kohei Gondo (Japan) Ayane Kurihara |

=== Performance by nation ===
| Rank | Nation | IRI | AUT | BRA | VIE | POL | JPN | FIN | MAS | ESP | RUS | NGR | UKR | BEL | AUS | CZE | INA | HUN | UAE | IND | BAN | ITA | USA | Total |
|---|---|---|---|---|---|---|---|---|---|---|---|---|---|---|---|---|---|---|---|---|---|---|---|---|
| 1 | Japan | | 1 | | 1 | —N/a | 4 | 1 | | | 1 | | | | 4 | | 2 | | | | | | 3 | 17 |
| 2 | India | 1 | 1 | | | —N/a | | | | | | 3 | 2 | | | | | | 1 | 3 | | | | 11 |
| 3 | Indonesia | | | | 1 | —N/a | | 3 | 1 | | | | | | | | 3 | | | | 2 | | | 10 |
| 4 | Denmark | | 1 | | | —N/a | | | | 2 | | | | | | | | 3 | | | | 3 | | 9 |
| 5 | Russia | | 1 | 1 | | —N/a | | | | 1 | 1 | | | | | | | 1 | 1 | | | 2 | | 8 |
| 6 | France | | | | | —N/a | | | | 2 | | | | 1 | | 3 | | | | | | | | 6 |
| 6 | Malaysia | 1 | | | | —N/a | | 1 | 2 | | | | | | | | | | | | 2 | | | 6 |
| 8 | South Korea | | | | 1 | —N/a | 1 | | | | | | | | | | | | 3 | | | | | 5 |
| 9 | Chinese Taipei | | 1 | | | —N/a | | | 1 | | | | | 1 | | | | | | | | | 1 | 4 |
| 10 | Canada | | | 2.5 | | —N/a | | | | | | | | | | | | | | | | | 1 | 3.5 |
| 11 | Vietnam | 1 | | | 1 | —N/a | | | | | | | | | | | | | | | 1 | | | 3 |
| 12 | England | | | | | —N/a | | | | | | | | 1 | | 1 | | | | | | | | 2 |
| 12 | Germany | | | | | —N/a | | | | | 1 | | | | | 1 | | | | | | | | 2 |
| 12 | Hong Kong | | | | | —N/a | | | | | 1 | | | | | | | | | 1 | | | | 2 |
| 12 | Israel | | | | | —N/a | | | | | | 2 | | | | | | | | | | | | 2 |
| 12 | Netherlands | | | | | —N/a | | | | | | | | 2 | | | | | | | | | | 2 |
| 12 | Thailand | | | | 1 | —N/a | | | | | | | | | | | | | | 1 | | | | 2 |
| 12 | Turkey | | | | | —N/a | | | | | | | 1 | | | | | 1 | | | | | | 2 |
| 19 | Brazil | | | 1 | | —N/a | | | | | | | | | | | | | | | | | | 1 |
| 19 | China | | | | | —N/a | | | 1 | | | | | | | | | | | | | | | 1 |
| 19 | Czech Republic | | | | | —N/a | | | | | | | 1 | | | | | | | | | | | 1 |
| 19 | Iran | 1 | | | | —N/a | | | | | | | | | | | | | | | | | | 1 |
| 19 | Singapore | | | | | —N/a | | | | | | | | | 1 | | | | | | | | | 1 |
| 19 | Spain | | | | | —N/a | | | | | 1 | | | | | | | | | | | | | 1 |
| 19 | Sweden | | | | | —N/a | | | | | | | 1 | | | | | | | | | | | 1 |
| 26 | United States | | | 0.5 | | —N/a | | | | | | | | | | | | | | | | | | 0.5 |

=== Players with multiple titles ===
In alphabetical order.

| Rank | Player | MS | WS | MD | WD | XD | Total |
|---|---|---|---|---|---|---|---|
| 1 | (Russia) Alina Davletova | | | | 2 | 2 | 4 |
| 2 | (Russia) Evgenia Dimova | | | | | 3 | 3 |
| 2 | (Russia) Evgenij Dremin | | | | | 3 | 3 |
| 2 | (Canada) Rachel Honderich | | 1 | | 2 | | 3 |
| 5 | (Russia) Rodion Alimov | | | | | 2 | 2 |
| 5 | (Netherlands) Jacco Arends | | | 1 | | 1 | 2 |
| 5 | (India) Manu Attri | | | 1 | | 1 | 2 |
| 5 | (Bulgaria) Ekaterina Bolotova | | | | 2 | | 2 |
| 5 | (Indonesia) Leo Rolly Carnando | | | 1 | | 1 | 2 |
| 5 | (India) Ashmita Chaliha | | 2 | | | | 2 |
| 5 | (France) Delphine Delrue | | | | 2 | | 2 |
| 5 | (Japan) Kohei Gondo | | | | | 2 | 2 |
| 5 | (Japan) Yu Igarashi | 2 | | | | | 2 |
| 5 | (Japan) Ayane Kurihara | | | | | 2 | 2 |
| 5 | (France) Ronan Labar | | | 1 | | 1 | 2 |
| 5 | (South Korea) Lee Yu-rim | | | | 1 | 1 | 2 |
| 5 | (France) Lea Palermo | | | | 2 | | 2 |
| 5 | (France) Toma Junior Popov | 2 | | | | | 2 |
| 5 | (India) B. Sumeeth Reddy | | | 2 | | | 2 |
| 5 | (South Korea) Yoo Yeon-seong | | | 1 | | 1 | 2 |
