= 2019 BWF World Championships qualification =

These are the lists of entries of 2019 BWF World Championships (World Badminton Championships) qualification.

== Overview ==
=== Events ===
This event holds men's singles and doubles, women's singles and doubles, and mixed doubles.

=== Number of players/member association quota ===
This event's total limit of eligibility players is 400 players, the following charts are the rules and the distribution.

| | Men's singles | Women's singles | Men's doubles | Women's doubles | Mixed doubles | Total |
|---|---|---|---|---|---|---|
| Entry limits | 64 players | 48 players | 96 players (48 pairs) | 96 players (48 pairs) | 96 players (48 pairs) | 400 players |

| Players / pairs ranked on date eligible | Total number of players / pairs from any one Member Association in that event shall no exceed |
|---|---|
| 1 to 8 | 4 |
| 9 to 24 | 3 |
| 25 to 150 | 2 |

== Participating players ==
=== Men's singles ===
Due to the phase 2 updated by BWF, the following chart is the invitation results.

Players who ranked from 1 to 8, whose association could nominate 4 players.
Players who ranked from 9 to 24, whose association could nominate 3 players.
Players who ranked from 25 to 150, whose association could nominate 2 players.

| Rank | Nation / Player | Points | Eligibility | | Note |
|---|---|---|---|---|---|
| 1 | (Japan) Kento Momota | 108,800 | 1 | Japan (1) | BA highest ranked |
| 2 | (China) Shi Yuqi | 88,232 | | ~~China~~ | Injured, Decline participation |
| 3 | (Denmark) Viktor Axelsen | 79,264 | | ~~Denmark~~ | BE highest ranked, Injured, Decline participation |
| 4 | (Chinese Taipei) Chou Tien-chen | 77,464 | 2 | Chinese Taipei (1) | |
| 5 | (China) Chen Long | 75,128 | 3 | China (1) | |
| 6 | (South Korea) Son Wan-ho | 71,562 | | ~~South Korea~~ | Injured, Decline participation |
| 7 | (Indonesia) Anthony Sinisuka Ginting | 63,780 | 4 | Indonesia (1) | |
| 8 | (India) Srikanth Kidambi | 63,140 | 5 | India (1) | |
| 9 | (Indonesia) Jonatan Christie | 62,132 | 6 | Indonesia (2) | |
| 10 | (Japan) Kenta Nishimoto | 58,127 | 7 | Japan (2) | |
| 11 | (Japan) Kanta Tsuneyama | 56,708 | 8 | Japan (3) | |
| 12 | (China) Lin Dan | 56,373 | 9 | China (2) | |
| 13 | (Indonesia) Tommy Sugiarto | 55,340 | 10 | Indonesia (3) | |
| 14 | (Denmark) Anders Antonsen | 55,299 | 11 | Denmark (1) | |
| 15 | (India) Sameer Verma | 54,941 | 12 | India (2) | |
| 16 | (Hong Kong) Ng Ka Long | 50,488 | 13 | Hong Kong (1) | |
| 17 | (China) Lu Guangzu | 50,369 | 61 | China (3) | Reserve 1 |
| 18 | (Thailand) Khosit Phetpradab | 49,239 | 14 | Thailand (1) | |
| 19 | (Thailand) Kantaphon Wangcharoen | 49,007 | 15 | Thailand (2) | |
| 20 | (India) B. Sai Praneeth | 47,827 | 16 | India (3) | |
| 21 | (Malaysia) Lee Zii Jia | 44,907 | 17 | Malaysia (1) | |
| 22 | (Denmark) Jan Ø. Jørgensen | 42,705 | 18 | Denmark (2) | |
| 23 | (Denmark) Hans-Kristian Vittinghus | 42,189 | 62 | Denmark (3) | Reserve 2 |
| 24 | (Malaysia) Liew Daren | 41,820 | 19 | Malaysia (2) | |
| 25 | (Thailand) Sitthikom Thammasin | 41,670 | | ~~Thailand~~ | Reserve 3, Decline participation |
| 26 | (India) Prannoy Kumar | 41,570 | 63 | India (4) | Reserve 4 |
| 27 | (South Korea) Lee Dong-keun | 41,549 | 20 | South Korea (1) | |
| 28 | (Thailand) Suppanyu Avihingsanon | 40,966 | | Thailand | Reserve 5 |
| 29 | (China) Huang Yuxiang | 40,900 | 64 | China (4) | Reserve 6 |
| 30 | (Netherlands) Mark Caljouw | 39,813 | 21 | Netherlands (1) | |
| 31 | (Denmark) Rasmus Gemke | 39,721 | | Denmark | Reserve 7 |
| 32 | (Chinese Taipei) Wang Tzu-wei | 39,082 | 22 | Chinese Taipei (2) | |
| 33 | (Hong Kong) Lee Cheuk Yiu | 38,701 | 23 | Hong Kong (2) | |
| 34 | (China) Zhao Junpeng | 37,235 | | China | Reserve 8 |
| 35 | (Hong Kong) Wong Wing Ki | 37,008 | | Hong Kong | Reserve 9 |
| 36 | (France) Brice Leverdez | 36,780 | 24 | France (1) | |
| 37 | (England) Rajiv Ouseph | 36,222 | 25 | England (1) | |
| 38 | (Japan) Kazumasa Sakai | 35,145 | | Japan | Reserve 10 |
| 39 | (India) Parupalli Kashyap | 34,850 | | India | Reserve 11 |
| 40 | (China) Zhou Zeqi | 33,330 | | China | Reserve 12 |
| 41 | (India) Subhankar Dey | 32,100 | | India | Reserve 13 |
| 42 | (Indonesia) Shesar Hiren Rhustavito | 31,904 | | Indonesia | Reserve 14 |
| 43 | (Indonesia) Firman Abdul Kholik | 31,228 | | Indonesia | Reserve 15 |
| 44 | (South Korea) Heo Kwang-hee | 31,019 | 26 | South Korea (2) | |
| 45 | (France) Thomas Rouxel | 30,570 | 27 | France (2) | |
| 46 | (Indonesia) Ihsan Maulana Mustofa | 30,548 | | Indonesia | Reserve 16 |
| 47 | (India) Ajay Jayaram | 30,000 | | India | Reserve 17 |
| 48 | (Israel) Misha Zilberman | 29,740 | 28 | Israel (1) | |
| 49 | (India) Sourabh Verma | 29,309 | | India | Reserve 18 |
| 50 | (Singapore) Loh Kean Yew | 28,999 | 29 | Singapore (1) | |
| 51 | (France) Toma Junior Popov | 28,801 | | France | Reserve 19 |
| 52 | (France) Lucas Corvée | 28,504 | | France | Reserve 20 |
| 53 | (Malaysia) Chong Wei Feng | 28,420 | | Malaysia | Reserve 21 |
| 54 | (Spain) Pablo Abián | 27,804 | 30 | Spain (1) | |
| 55 | (Indonesia) Chico Aura Dwi Wardoyo | 27,800 | | Indonesia | Reserve 22 |
| 56 | (Denmark) Victor Svendsen | 27,800 | | Denmark | Reserve 23 |
| 57 | (Chinese Taipei) Hsu Jen-hao | 27,798 | | Chinese Taipei | Reserve 24 |
| 58 | (Thailand) Tanongsak Saensomboonsuk | 27,770 | | Thailand | Reserve 25 |
| 59 | (Japan) Yu Igarashi | 27,730 | | Japan | Reserve 26 |
| 60 | (Japan) Koki Watanabe | 27,680 | | Japan | Reserve 27 |
| 61 | (Brazil) Ygor Coelho de Oliveira | 27,370 | 31 | Brazil (1) | BPA highest ranked |
| 62 | (Chinese Taipei) Lu Chia-hung | 26,860 | | Chinese Taipei | Reserve 28 |
| 63 | (South Korea) Lee Hyun-il | 26,780 | | South Korea | Reserve 29 |
| 64 | (Russia) Vladimir Malkov | 25,639 | 32 | Russia (1) | |
| 65 | (Vietnam) Nguyễn Tiến Minh | 25,570 | 33 | Vietnam (1) | |
| 66 | (England) Toby Penty | 25,399 | 34 | England (2) | |
| 67 | (Chinese Taipei) Lin Yu-hsien | 24,390 | | Chinese Taipei | Reserve 30 |
| 68 | (Thailand) Kunlavut Vitidsarn | 24,180 | | Thailand | |
| 69 | (Guatemala) Kevin Cordón | 23,873 | 35 | Guatemala (1) | |
| 70 | (Malaysia) Soo Teck Zhi | 23,740 | | Malaysia | |
| 71 | (India) Lakshya Sen | 22,868 | | India | |
| 72 | (Canada) Jason Ho-shue | 22,138 | 36 | Canada (1) | |
| 73 | (Malaysia) Cheam June Wei | 21,973 | | Malaysia | |
| 74 | (Russia) Sergey Sirant | 21,964 | 37 | Russia (2) | |
| 75 | (Spain) Luís Enrique Peñalver | 21,878 | 38 | Spain (2) | |
| 76 | (Indonesia) Sony Dwi Kuncoro | 21,330 | | Indonesia | |
| 77 | (Japan) Riichi Takeshita | 21,320 | | Japan | |
| 78 | (India) Mithun Manjunath | 21,310 | | India | |
| 79 | (Malaysia) Soong Joo Ven | 21,137 | | Malaysia | |
| 80 | (Chinese Taipei) Yang Chih-chieh | 20,558 | | Chinese Taipei | |
| 81 | (Japan) Minoru Koga | 20,194 | | Japan | |
| 82 | (Japan) Kodai Naraoka | 20,080 | | Japan | |
| 83 | (Denmark) Kim Bruun | 19,980 | | Denmark | |
| 84 | (Azerbaijan) Ade Resky Dwicahyo | 19,710 | | ~~Azerbaijan~~ | Not eligible |
| 85 | (Finland) Eetu Heino | 19,680 | 39 | Finland (1) | |
| 86 | (Sweden) Felix Burestedt | 18,470 | 40 | Sweden (1) | |
| 87 | (India) Harsheel Dani | 18,250 | | India | |
| 88 | (Czech Republic) Milan Ludík | 18,164 | 41 | Czech Republic (1) | |
| 89 | (Vietnam) Phạm Cao Cường | 18,150 | 42 | Vietnam (2) | |
| 90 | (Finland) Kalle Koljonen | 17,898 | 43 | Finland (2) | |
| 91 | (Canada) Sheng Xiaodong | 17,710 | | ~~Canada~~ | Decline participation |
| 92 | (Estonia) Raul Must | 17,419 | 44 | Estonia (1) | |
| 93 | (Belgium) Maxime Moreels | 17,303 | 45 | Belgium (1) | |
| 94 | (China) Ren Pengbo | 17,290 | | China | |
| 95 | (Hungary) Gergely Krausz | 17,254 | 46 | Hungary (1) | |
| 96 | (Denmark) Rasmus Messerschmidt | 17,160 | | Denmark | |
| 97 | (Austria) Luka Wraber | 17,130 | 47 | Austria (1) | |
| 98 | (Indonesia) Panji Ahmad Maulana | 17,080 | | Indonesia | |
| 99 | (Germany) Kai Schäfer | 16,920 | 48 | Germany (1) | |
| 100 | (Czech Republic) Adam Mendrek | 16,694 | 49 | Czech Republic (2) | |
| 101 | (Poland) Michał Rogalski | 16,657 | 50 | Poland (1) | |
| 102 | (England) Alex Lane | 16,630 | | England | |
| 103 | (Japan) Hashiru Shimono | 16,610 | | Japan | |
| 104 | (Indonesia) Ikhsan Rumbay | 16,390 | | Indonesia | |
| 105 | (Malaysia) Iskandar Zulkarnain Zainuddin | 16,389 | | Malaysia | |
| 106 | (France) Lucas Claerbout | 16,380 | | France | |
| 107 | (Hong Kong) Hu Yun | 16,362 | | Hong Kong | |
| 108 | (Malaysia) Goh Giap Chin | 16,290 | | Malaysia | |
| 109 | (China) Sun Feixiang | 16,280 | | China | |
| 110 | (Sri Lanka) Niluka Karunaratne | 16,240 | 51 | Sri Lanka (1) | |
| 111 | (Turkey) Emre Lale | 16,120 | 52 | Turkey (1) | |
| 112 | (Croatia) Zvonimir Đurkinjak | 16,020 | 53 | Croatia (1) | |
| 113 | (Finland) Iikka Heino | 15,770 | | Finland | |
| 114 | (Cuba) Osleni Guerrero | 15,749 | | ~~Cuba~~ | Decline participation |
| 115 | (Malaysia) Lee Chong Wei | 15,715 | | ~~Malaysia~~ | Retired |
| 116 | (Germany) Alexander Roovers | 15,552 | | ~~Germany~~ | Decline participation |
| 117 | (Republic of Ireland) Nhat Nguyen | 15,168 | 54 | Ireland (1) | |
| 118 | (China) Liu Haichao | 15,160 | | China | |
| 119 | (Indonesia) Gatjra Piliang Fiqihilahi Cupu | 14,560 | | Indonesia | |
| 120 | (Italy) Rosario Maddaloni | 14,507 | 55 | Italy (1) | |
| 121 | (Indonesia) Vicky Angga Saputra | 14,440 | | Indonesia | |
| 122 | (Chinese Taipei) Lee Chia-hao | 14,200 | | Chinese Taipei | |
| 123 | (Mexico) Lino Muñoz | 14,058 | 56 | Mexico (1) | |
| 124 | (India) Siddharath Thakur | 13,970 | | India | |
| 125 | (Ukraine) Artem Pochtarov | 13,970 | 57 | Ukraine (1) | |
| 126 | (India) Gurusai Dutt | 13,940 | | India | |
| 127 | (India) Kevin Arokia Walter | 13,880 | | India | |
| 128 | (Denmark) Mads Christophersen | 13,880 | | Denmark | |
| 129 | (Thailand) Adulrach Namkul | 13,780 | | Thailand | |
| 130 | (China) Li Shifeng | 13,690 | | China | |
| 131 | (New Zealand) Abhinav Manota | 13,555 | | ~~New Zealand~~ | BO highest ranked, Decline participation |
| 132 | (Azerbaijan) Azmy Qowimuramadhoni | 13,490 | | Azerbaijan | |
| 133 | (Japan) Takuma Obayashi | 13,390 | | Japan | |
| 134 | (India) Siddharth Pratap Singh | 13,240 | | India | |
| 135 | (Mauritius) Georges Paul | 13,190 | 58 | Mauritius (1) | BCA highest ranked |
150+
| 168 | (Australia) Daniel Fan | 9,970 | 59 | Australia (1) | |
| 171 | (Switzerland) Christian Kirchmayr | 9,830 | 60 | Switzerland (1) | Host nation's presenter |

=== Women's singles ===
Due to the phase 2 updated by BWF, the following chart is the invitation results.

Players who ranked from 1 to 8, whose association could nominate 4 players.
Players who ranked from 9 to 24, whose association could nominate 3 players.
Players who ranked from 25 to 150, whose association could nominate 2 players.

| Rank | Nation / Player | Points | Eligibility | | Note |
|---|---|---|---|---|---|
| 1 | (Chinese Taipei) Tai Tzu-ying | 95,667 | 1 | Chinese Taipei (1) | BA highest ranked |
| 2 | (Japan) Nozomi Okuhara | 88,800 | 2 | Japan (1) | |
| 3 | (China) Chen Yufei | 87,979 | 3 | China (1) | |
| 4 | (Japan) Akane Yamaguchi | 86,723 | 4 | Japan (2) | |
| 5 | (India) P. V. Sindhu | 76,740 | 5 | India (1) | |
| 6 | (China) He Bingjiao | 75,920 | 6 | China (2) | |
| 7 | (Thailand) Ratchanok Intanon | 73,547 | 7 | Thailand (1) | |
| 8 | (Spain) Carolina Marín | 70,000 | | ~~Spain~~ | BE highest ranked, Injured |
| 9 | (India) Saina Nehwal | 67,874 | 8 | India (2) | |
| 10 | (South Korea) Sung Ji-hyun | 60,556 | 9 | South Korea (1) | |
| 11 | (United States) Zhang Beiwen | 57,560 | 10 | United States (1) | BPA highest ranked |
| 12 | (China) Han Yue | 53,686 | 11 | China (3) | |
| 13 | (Japan) Sayaka Takahashi | 52,507 | 12 | Japan (3) | |
| 14 | (China) Cai Yanyan | 52,243 | 45 | China (4) | Reserve 1 |
| 15 | (China) Li Xuerui | 52,182 | | China | Reserve 2 |
| 16 | (Canada) Michelle Li | 51,571 | 13 | Canada (1) | |
| 17 | (Indonesia) Gregoria Mariska Tunjung | 50,790 | 14 | Indonesia (1) | |
| 18 | (Japan) Aya Ohori | 49,644 | 46 | Japan (4) | Reserve 3 |
| 19 | (Denmark) Line Kjærsfeldt | 48,243 | 15 | Denmark (1) | |
| 20 | (Thailand) Pornpawee Chochuwong | 48,192 | 16 | Thailand (2) | |
| 21 | (China) Gao Fangjie | 46,476 | | ~~China~~ | Reserve 4, Injured |
| 22 | (Denmark) Mia Blichfeldt | 46,369 | 17 | Denmark (2) | |
| 23 | (China) Chen Xiaoxin | 46,180 | | China | Reserve 5 |
| 24 | (Thailand) Busanan Ongbamrungphan | 45,069 | 18 | Thailand (3) | |
| 25 | (Malaysia) Goh Jin Wei | 42,045 | | ~~Malaysia~~ | Decline participation |
| 26 | (Scotland) Kirsty Gilmour | 41,095 | 19 | Scotland (1) | |
| 27 | (Hong Kong) Cheung Ngan Yi | 40,500 | 20 | Hong Kong (1) | |
| 28 | (Japan) Saena Kawakami | 39,850 | | Japan | Reserve 6 |
| 29 | (Thailand) Nitchaon Jindapol | 39,732 | 47 | Thailand (4) | Reserve 7 |
| 30 | (Indonesia) Fitriani | 38,543 | 21 | Indonesia (2) | |
| 31 | (Japan) Sayaka Sato | 38,505 | | Japan | Reserve 8 |
| 32 | (Singapore) Yeo Jia Min | 37,769 | 22 | Singapore (1) | |
| 33 | (Hong Kong) Deng Xuan | 36,100 | | ~~Hong Kong~~ | Decline participation |
| 34 | (South Korea) Kim Ga-eun | 36,030 | 23 | South Korea (2) | |
| 35 | (China) Zhang Yiman | 35,750 | | China | Reserve 9 |
| 36 | (Malaysia) Soniia Cheah Su Ya | 35,587 | 24 | Malaysia (2) | |
| 37 | (Hong Kong) Yip Pui Yin | 35,234 | 25 | Hong Kong (2) | |
| 38 | (Japan) Ayumi Mine | 33,630 | | Japan | Reserve 10 |
| 39 | (Russia) Evgeniya Kosetskaya | 32,991 | 26 | Russia (1) | |
| 40 | (Indonesia) Ruselli Hartawan | 31,920 | | Indonesia | Reserve 11 |
| 41 | (Japan) Minatsu Mitani | 30,760 | | Japan | Reserve 12 |
| 42 | (Germany) Yvonne Li | 30,142 | 27 | Germany (1) | |
| 43 | (Indonesia) Lyanny Alessandra Mainaky | 29,840 | | Indonesia | Reserve 13 |
| 44 | (Chinese Taipei) Pai Yu-po | 28,672 | 28 | Chinese Taipei (2) | |
| 45 | (Spain) Beatriz Corrales | 28,466 | | ~~Spain~~ | Decline participation |
| 46 | (Turkey) Neslihan Yiğit | 28,380 | 29 | Turkey (1) | |
| 47 | (Canada) Rachel Honderich | 28,204 | 30 | Canada (2) | |
| 48 | (England) Chloe Birch | 27,982 | 31 | England (1) | |
| 49 | (Thailand) Porntip Buranaprasertsuk | 27,940 | | Thailand | Reserve 14 |
| 50 | (South Korea) Kim Hyo-min | 27,440 | 48 | South Korea (3) | Reserve 15 |
| 51 | (Vietnam) Nguyễn Thùy Linh | 27,380 | 32 | Vietnam (1) | |
| 52 | (Denmark) Julie Dawall Jakobsen | 26,750 | | Denmark | Reserve 16 |
| 53 | (Chinese Taipei) Lee Chia-hsin | 26,580 | | Chinese Taipei | Reserve 17 |
| 54 | (Indonesia) Yulia Yosephin Susanto | 25,880 | | Indonesia | Reserve 18 |
| 55 | (Thailand) Chananchida Jucharoen | 25,860 | | Thailand | Reserve 19 |
| 56 | (Canada) Brittney Tam | 25,777 | | Canada | Reserve 20 |
| 57 | (Indonesia) Dinar Dyah Ayustine | 25,613 | | Indonesia | Reserve 21 |
| 58 | (Indonesia) Choirunnisa | 25,610 | | Indonesia | Reserve 22 |
| 59 | (Israel) Ksenia Polikarpova | 25,480 | 33 | Israel (1) | |
| 60 | (Chinese Taipei) Chiang Ying-li | 25,449 | | Chinese Taipei | Reserve 23 |
| 61 | (Turkey) Aliye Demirbağ | 25,390 | 34 | Turkey (2) | |
| 62 | (Switzerland) Sabrina Jaquet | 25,179 | 35 | Switzerland (1) | Host nation's presenter |
| 63 | (Estonia) Kristin Kuuba | 24,085 | 36 | Estonia (1) | |
| 64 | (Bulgaria) Linda Zetchiri | 23,543 | 37 | Bulgaria (1) | |
| 65 | (India) Mugdha Agrey | 22,970 | | India | Reserve 24 |
| 66 | (India) Vaishnavi Reddy Jakka | 22,955 | | India | Reserve 25 |
| 67 | (India) Rituparna Das | 22,930 | | India | Reserve 26 |
| 68 | (Netherlands) Soraya de Visch Eijbergen | 22,740 | 38 | Netherlands (1) | |
| 69 | (Vietnam) Vũ Thị Trang | 22,510 | 39 | Vietnam (2) | |
| 70 | (Chinese Taipei) Sung Shuo-yun | 22,450 | | Chinese Taipei | Reserve 27 |
| 71 | (South Korea) Jeon Ju-i | 22,410 | | South Korea | Reserve 28 |
| 72 | (United States) Crystal Pan | 22,200 | 40 | United States (2) | |
| 73 | (Turkey) Özge Bayrak | 21,910 | | Turkey | Reserve 29 |
| 74 | (Thailand) Phittayaporn Chaiwan | 21,910 | | Thailand | Reserve 30 |
| 75 | (Japan) Shiori Saito | 21,780 | | Japan | |
| 76 | (Belgium) Lianne Tan | 21,683 | 41 | Belgium (1) | |
| 77 | (France) Qi Xuefei | 21,440 | | ~~France~~ | Decline participation |
| 78 | (South Korea) An Se-young | 21,420 | | South Korea | |
| 79 | (South Korea) Sim Yu-jin | 21,180 | | South Korea | |
| 80 | (India) Sri Krishna Priya Kudaravalli | 21,132 | | India | |
| 81 | (India) Riya Mookerjee | 20,910 | | India | |
| 82 | (Thailand) Supanida Katethong | 20,510 | | Thailand | |
| 83 | (China) Ji Shuting | 20,480 | | China | |
| 84 | (Japan) Asuka Takahashi | 20,390 | | Japan | |
| 85 | (Chinese Taipei) Lin Ying-chun | 20,344 | | Chinese Taipei | |
| 86 | (Malaysia) Lee Ying Ying | 20,101 | | Malaysia | |
| 87 | (Germany) Fabienne Deprez | 19,974 | 42 | Germany (2) | |
| 88 | (Chinese Taipei) Liang Ting-yu | 19,913 | | Chinese Taipei | |
| 89 | (Mauritius) Kate Foo Kune | 19,617 | | ~~Mauritius~~ | BCA highest ranked, Injured, Decline participation |
| 90 | (South Korea) Lee Se-yeon | 19,504 | | South Korea | |
| 91 | (Spain) Clara Azurmendi | 19,330 | | Spain | |
| 92 | (India) Vrushali Gummadi | 19,220 | | India | |
| 93 | (United States) Disha Gupta | 19,100 | | United States | |
| 94 | (India) Sai Uttejitha Rao Chukka | 18,730 | | India | |
| 95 | (Bulgaria) Mariya Mitsova | 18,464 | 43 | Bulgaria (2) | |
| 96 | (Denmark) Michelle Skødstrup | 18,330 | | Denmark | |
| 97 | (Chinese Taipei) Chen Su-yu | 18,213 | | Chinese Taipei | |
| 98 | (United States) Isabel Zhong | 18,170 | | United States | |
| 99 | (Wales) Jordan Hart | 18,120 | | Wales | |
| 100 | (Russia) Natalia Perminova | 17,936 | | Russia | |
| 101 | (Denmark) Irina Amalie Andersen | 17,780 | | Denmark | |
| 102 | (Australia) Chen Hsuan-yu | 17,339 | 44 | Australia (1) | BO highest ranked |

=== Men's doubles ===
Due to the phase 2 updated by BWF, the following chart is the invitation results.

Players who ranked from 1 to 8, whose association could nominate 4 pairs.
Players who ranked from 9 to 24, whose association could nominate 3 pairs.
Players who ranked from 25 to 150, whose association could nominate 2 pairs.

| Rank | Nation / Player | Points | Eligibility | | Note |
|---|---|---|---|---|---|
| 1 | (Indonesia) Marcus Fernaldi Gideon (Indonesia) Kevin Sanjaya Sukamuljo | 101,683 | 1 | Indonesia (1) | BA highest ranked |
| 2 | (Japan) Takeshi Kamura (Japan) Keigo Sonoda | 83,476 | 2 | Japan (1) | |
| 3 | (China) Li Junhui (China) Liu Yuchen | 83,355 | 3 | China (1) | |
| 4 | (Indonesia) Hendra Setiawan (Indonesia) Mohammad Ahsan | 71,660 | 4 | Indonesia (2) | |
| 5 | (Indonesia) Fajar Alfian (Indonesia) Muhammad Rian Ardianto | 70,515 | 5 | Indonesia (3) | |
| 6 | (China) Han Chengkai (China) Zhou Haodong | 69,291 | 6 | China (2) | |
| 7 | (Japan) Hiroyuki Endo (Japan) Yuta Watanabe | 68,280 | 7 | Japan (2) | |
| 8 | (Chinese Taipei) Chen Hung-ling (Chinese Taipei) Wang Chi-lin | 67,651 | | ~~Chinese Taipei~~ | Chen Hung-ling retired Wang Chi-lin unites with Lee Yang; Decline participation |
| 9 | (Denmark) Kim Astrup (Denmark) Anders Skaarup Rasmussen | 65,490 | 8 | Denmark (1) | BE highest ranked |
| 10 | (China) Liu Cheng (China) Zhang Nan | 59,500 | 9 | China (3) | |
| 11 | (Chinese Taipei) Liao Min-chun (Chinese Taipei) Su Ching-heng | 57,934 | 10 | Chinese Taipei (1) | |
| 12 | (China) He Jiting (China) Tan Qiang | 57,400 | 41 | China (4) | Reserve 1 |
| 13 | (Japan) Takuto Inoue (Japan) Yuki Kaneko | 57,287 | 11 | Japan (3) | |
| 14 | (Malaysia) Aaron Chia (Malaysia) Soh Wooi Yik | 56,110 | 12 | Malaysia (1) | |
| 15 | (Malaysia) Goh V Shem (Malaysia) Tan Wee Kiong | 54,644 | 13 | Malaysia (2) | |
| 16 | (Japan) Takuro Hoki (Japan) Yugo Kobayashi | 50,906 | 42 | Japan (4) | Reserve 2 |
| 17 | (Indonesia) Berry Angriawan (Indonesia) Hardianto | 49,240 | 43 | Indonesia (4) | Reserve 3 |
| 18 | (England) Marcus Ellis (England) Chris Langridge | 47,792 | 14 | England (1) | |
| 19 | (Chinese Taipei) Lee Jhe-huei (Chinese Taipei) Lee Yang | 46,208 | | ~~Chinese Taipei~~ | Lee Jhe-huei unites with Yang Po-hsuan; Lee Yang unites with Wang Chi-lin; Decline participation |
| 20 | (Chinese Taipei) Lu Ching-yao (Chinese Taipei) Yang Po-han | 46,042 | 15 | Chinese Taipei (2) | |
| 21 | (China) Ou Xuanyi (China) Ren Xiangyu | 45,530 | | China | Reserve 4 |
| 22 | (India) Manu Attri (India) B. Sumeeth Reddy | 45,140 | 16 | India (1) | |
| 23 | (Russia) Vladimir Ivanov (Russia) Ivan Sozonov | 45,097 | 17 | Russia (1) | |
| 24 | (Malaysia) Ong Yew Sin (Malaysia) Teo Ee Yi | 44,860 | 18 | Malaysia (3) | |
| 25 | (Indonesia) Wahyu Nayaka (Indonesia) Ade Yusuf | 44,100 | | Indonesia | Reserve 5 |
| 26 | (India) Satwiksairaj Rankireddy (India) Chirag Shetty | 42,880 | 19 | India (2) | |
| 27 | (Germany) Mark Lamsfuß (Germany) Marvin Emil Seidel | 41,615 | 20 | Germany (1) | |
| 28 | (Denmark) Mathias Boe (Denmark) Carsten Mogensen | 40,360 | | ~~Denmark~~ | Mathias Boe reunites with Mads Conrad-Petersen; Carsten Mogensen unites with Mads Pieler Kolding; Decline participation |
| 29 | (Malaysia) Mohamad Arif Abdul Latif (Malaysia) Nur Mohd Azriyn Ayub | 38,890 | 44 | Malaysia (4) | Reserve 6 |
| 30 | (South Korea) Kim Gi-jung (South Korea) Lee Yong-dae | 38,250 | | ~~South Korea~~ | Decline participation |
| 31 | (Netherlands) Jelle Maas (Netherlands) Robin Tabeling | 38,200 | 21 | Netherlands (1) | |
| 32 | (Chinese Taipei) Lee Yang (Chinese Taipei) Wang Chi-lin | 37,860 | 45 | Chinese Taipei (3) | Reserve 7 |
| 33 | (South Korea) Kang Min-hyuk (South Korea) Kim Won-ho | 32,967 | | ~~South Korea~~ | Decline participation |
| 34 | (Thailand) Bodin Isara (Thailand) Maneepong Jongjit | 37,140 | 22 | Thailand (1) | |
| 35 | (Denmark) Mads Conrad-Petersen (Denmark) Mads Pieler Kolding | 36,163 | | ~~Denmark~~ | Mads Conrad-Petersen reunites with Mathias Boe; Mads Pieler Kolding unites with Carsten Mogensen; Decline participation |
| 36 | (Thailand) Tinn Isriyanet (Thailand) Kittisak Namdash | 35,630 | | ~~Thailand~~ | Decline participation |
| 37 | (South Korea) Ko Sung-hyun (South Korea) Shin Baek-cheol | 35,570 | | ~~South Korea~~ | Decline participation |
| 38 | (Malaysia) Goh Sze Fei (Malaysia) Nur Izzuddin | 34,548 | | Malaysia | Reserve 8 |
| 39 | (Canada) Jason Ho-shue (Canada) Nyl Yakura | 33,817 | 23 | Canada (1) | BPA highest ranked |
| 40 | (South Korea) Choi Sol-gyu (South Korea) Seo Seung-jae | 33,284 | 24 | South Korea (1) | |
| 41 | (Malaysia) Chooi Kah Ming (Malaysia) Low Juan Shen | 33,240 | | Malaysia | Reserve 9 |
| 42 | (Denmark) David Daugaard (Denmark) Frederik Søgaard | 32,708 | | ~~Denmark~~ | Decline participation |
| 43 | (China) Huang Kaixiang (China) Wang Zekang | 31,790 | | China | Reserve 10 |
| 44 | (Thailand) Dechapol Puavaranukroh (Thailand) Kittinupong Kedren | 30,632 | | Thailand | Reserve 11 |
| 45 | (Indonesia) Sabar Karyaman Gutama (Indonesia) Frengky Wijaya Putra | 29,871 | | Indonesia | Reserve 12 |
| 46 | (Indonesia) Akbar Bintang Cahyono (Indonesia) Muhammad Reza Pahlevi Isfahani | 29,280 | | Indonesia | Reserve 13 |
| 47 | (Japan) Akira Koga (Japan) Taichi Saito | 29,200 | | Japan | Reserve 14 |
| 48 | (South Korea) Chung Eui-seok (South Korea) Kim Duk-young | 28,097 | | South Korea | Reserve 15 |
| 49 | (England) Ben Lane (England) Sean Vendy | 27,930 | 25 | England (2) | |
| 50 | (Netherlands) Jacco Arends (Netherlands) Ruben Jille | 27,897 | | ~~Netherlands~~ | Decline participation |
| 51 | (India) Arjun M.R. (India) Ramchandran Shlok | 27,718 | 46 | India (3) | Reserve 16 |
| 52 | (United States) Phillip Chew (United States) Ryan Chew | 27,500 | 26 | United States (1) | |
| 53 | (Japan) Keiichiro Matsui (Japan) Yoshinori Takeuchi | 27,210 | | Japan | Reserve 17 |
| 54 | (Indonesia) Angga Pratama (Indonesia) Ricky Karanda Suwardi | 26,740 | | Indonesia | Reserve 18 |
| 55 | (Denmark) Mathias Bay-Smidt (Denmark) Lasse Mølhede | 25,720 | | Denmark | Reserve 19 |
| 56 | (Thailand) Inkarat Apisuk (Thailand) Tanupat Viriyangkura | 25,330 | | Thailand | Reserve 20 |
| 57 | (France) Thom Gicquel (France) Ronan Labar | 24,919 | 27 | France (1) | |
| 58 | (Scotland) Alexander Dunn (Scotland) Adam Hall | 24,540 | 28 | Scotland | |
| 59 | (India) Arun George (India) Sanyam Shukla | 24,342 | 47 | India (4) | Reserve 21 |
| 60 | (Japan) Hiroki Okamura (Japan) Masayuki Onodera | 24,200 | | Japan | Reserve 22 |
| 61 | (Chinese Taipei) Lin Shang-kai (Chinese Taipei) Tseng Min-hao | 23,220 | 48 | Chinese Taipei (4) | Reserve 23 |
| 62 | (Germany) Jones Ralfy Jansen (Germany) Josche Zurwonne | 23,107 | | ~~Germany~~ | Decline participation |
| 63 | (India) Tarun Kona (Malaysia) Lim Khim Wah | 21,980 | | India; Malaysia | Reserve 24 |
| 64 | (Hong Kong) Yonny Chung (Hong Kong) Tam Chun Hei | 21,220 | 29 | Hong Kong (1) | |
| 65 | (Azerbaijan) Ade Resky Dwicahyo (Azerbaijan) Azmy Qowimuramadhoni | 21,200 | | ~~Azerbaijan~~ | Not eligible |
| 66 | (Chinese Taipei) Lee Jhe-huei (Chinese Taipei) Yang Po-hsuan | 20,660 | | Chinese Taipei | Reserve 25 |
| 67 | (Canada) Joshua Hurlburt-Yu (Canada) Duncan Yao | 20,535 | 30 | Canada (2) | |
| 68 | (Japan) Mahiro Kaneko (Japan) Yunosuke Kubota | 19,710 | | Japan | Reserve 26 |
| 69 | (South Korea) Kim Won-ho (South Korea) Seo Seung-jae | 19,450 | | South Korea | Reserve 27 |
| 70 | (Russia) Denis Grachev (Russia) Pavel Kotsarenko | 19,320 | 31 | Russia (2) | |
| 71 | (Chinese Taipei) Chang Ko-chi (Chinese Taipei) Lu Chia-pin | 19,260 | | Chinese Taipei | Reserve 28 |
| 72 | (India) Vasantha Kumar Hanumaiah Ranganatha (India) Ashith Surya | 18,790 | | India | Reserve 29 |
| 73 | (Thailand) Pakin Kuna-Anuvit (Thailand) Natthapat Trinkajee | 18,510 | | Thailand | Reserve 30 |
| 74 | (Poland) Miłosz Bochat (Poland) Adam Cwalina | 17,800 | 32 | Poland (1) | |
| 75 | (England) Peter Briggs (England) Gregory Mairs | 17,730 | | England | |
| 76 | (Chinese Taipei) Lee Sheng-mu (Chinese Taipei) Yang Po-hsuan | 17,150 | | Chinese Taipei | |
| 77 | (Australia) Simon Leung (Australia) Mitchell Wheller | 16,991 | 33 | Australia (1) | BO highest ranked |
| 78 | (Hong Kong) Chang Tak Ching (Hong Kong) Yeung Ming Nok | 13,355 | 34 | Hong Kong (2) | |
| 79 | (Germany) Bjarne Geiss (Germany) Jan Colin Völker | 16,930 | 35 | Germany (2) | |
| 80 | (Japan) Masato Takano (Japan) Yoshiki Tsukamoto | 16,750 | | Japan | |
| 81 | (Thailand) Supak Jomkoh (Thailand) Wachirawit Sothon | 16,560 | | Thailand | |
| 82 | (China) Di Zijian (China) Wang Chang | 16,520 | | China | |
| 83 | (Czech Republic) Jaromír Janáček (Czech Republic) Tomáš Švejda | 16,235 | 36 | Czech Republic (1) | |
| 84 | (India) Krishna Prasad Garaga (India) Dhruv Kapila | 16,160 | | India | |
| 85 | (Thailand) Nipitphon Phuangphuapet (Thailand) Nanthakarn Yordphaisong | 15,710 | | Thailand | |
| 86 | (Republic of Ireland) Joshua Magee (Republic of Ireland) Paul Reynolds | 15,708 | 37 | Ireland (1) | |
| 87 | (Indonesia) Muhammad Shohibul Fikri (Indonesia) Bagas Maulana | 15,320 | | Indonesia | |
| 88 | (Chinese Taipei) Lee Fang-chih (Chinese Taipei) Lee Fang-jen | 15,200 | | Chinese Taipei | |
| 89 | (Austria) Philip Birker (Austria) Dominik Stipsits | 15,135 | 38 | Austria (1) | |
| 90 | (Guatemala) Jonathan Solís (Guatemala) Rodolfo Ramírez | 15,039 | | ~~Guatemala~~ | Decline participation |
| 91 | (Singapore) Danny Bawa Chrisnanta (Singapore) Terry Hee Yong Kai | 14,430 | | ~~Singapore~~ | Decline participation |
| 92 | (Chinese Taipei) Lin Chia-yu (Chinese Taipei) Yang Ming-tse | 14,230 | | Chinese Taipei | |
| 93 | (Bulgaria) Alex Vlaar (Bulgaria) Dimitar Yanakiev | 14,218 | | ~~Bulgaria~~ | Decline participation |
| 94 | (Nigeria) Godwin Olofua (Nigeria) Anuoluwapo Juwon Opeyori | 13,960 | | ~~Nigeria~~ | BCA highest ranked, Decline participation |
| 95 | (South Korea) Kim Sa-rang (Malaysia) Tan Boon Heong | 13,800 | | South Korea; Malaysia | |
| 96 | (Vietnam) Bảo Minh (Vietnam) Dương Bảo Đức | 13,660 | | ~~Vietnam~~ | Decline participation |
| 97 | (Cuba) Osleni Guerrero (Cuba) Leodannis Martínez | 13,594 | | ~~Cuba~~ | Decline participation |
| 98 | (Germany) Daniel Hess (Germany) Johannes Pistorius | 13,410 | | Germany | |
| 99 | (Chinese Taipei) Kan Chao-yu (Chinese Taipei) Liao Chi-hung | 13,180 | | Chinese Taipei | |
| 100 | (Russia) Vitalij Durkin (Russia) Nikolai Ukk | 12,960 | | Russia | |
| 101 | (Indonesia) Leo Rolly Carnando (Indonesia) Daniel Marthin | 12,930 | | Indonesia | |
| 102 | (France) Christo Popov (France) Toma Junior Popov | 12,790 | | France | |
| 103 | (Malaysia) Low Hang Yee (Malaysia) Ng Eng Cheong | 12,775 | | Malaysia | |
| 104 | (Peru) José Guevara (Peru) Daniel la Torre Regal | 12,278 | | ~~Peru~~ | Decline participation |
| 105 | (Singapore) Danny Bawa Chrisnanta (Singapore) Loh Kean Hean | 12,200 | 39 | Singapore (1) | |
150+
| 153 | (Algeria) Koceila Mammeri (Algeria) Youcef Sabri Medel | 7,247 | | ~~Algeria~~ | Decline participation |
| 1441 | (Switzerland) Tobias Kuenzi (Switzerland) Oliver Schaller | 51 | 40 | Switzerland (1) | Host nation's presenter |

=== Women's doubles ===
Due to the phase 2 updated by BWF, the following chart is the invitation results.

Players who ranked from 1 to 8, whose association could nominate 4 pairs.
Players who ranked from 9 to 24, whose association could nominate 3 pairs.
Players who ranked from 25 to 150, whose association could nominate 2 pairs.

| Rank | Nation / Player | Points | Eligibility | | Note |
|---|---|---|---|---|---|
| 1 | (Japan) Mayu Matsumoto (Japan) Wakana Nagahara | 95,770 | 1 | Japan (1) | BA highest ranked |
| 2 | (Japan) Yuki Fukushima (Japan) Sayaka Hirota | 94,358 | 2 | Japan (2) | |
| 3 | (China) Chen Qingchen (China) Jia Yifan | 88,456 | 3 | China (1) | |
| 4 | (Japan) Misaki Matsutomo (Japan) Ayaka Takahashi | 88,253 | 4 | Japan (3) | |
| 5 | (Indonesia) Greysia Polii (Indonesia) Apriyani Rahayu | 80,565 | 5 | Indonesia (1) | |
| 6 | (South Korea) Lee So-hee (South Korea) Shin Seung-chan | 69,330 | 6 | South Korea (1) | |
| 7 | (Japan) Shiho Tanaka (Japan) Koharu Yonemoto | 69,289 | 7 | Japan (4) | |
| 8 | (China) Du Yue (China) Li Yinhui | 65,500 | 8 | China (2) | |
| 9 | (Thailand) Jongkolphan Kititharakul (Thailand) Rawinda Prajongjai | 62,706 | 9 | Thailand (1) | |
| 10 | (Bulgaria) Gabriela Stoeva (Bulgaria) Stefani Stoeva | 61,900 | 10 | Bulgaria (1) | BE highest ranked |
| 11 | (South Korea) Jung Kyung-eun (South Korea) Chang Ye-na | 57,800 | | ~~South Korea~~ | Decline participation |
| 12 | (Japan) Ayako Sakuramoto (Japan) Yukiko Takahata | 55,924 | | Japan | Reserve 1 |
| 13 | (Japan) Nami Matsuyama (Japan) Chiharu Shida | 51,050 | | Japan | Reserve 2 |
| 14 | (Malaysia) Chow Mei Kuan (Malaysia) Lee Meng Yean | 49,802 | 11 | Malaysia (1) | |
| 15 | (China) Li Wenmei (China) Zheng Yu | 48,850 | 12 | China (3) | |
| 16 | (Indonesia) Della Destiara Haris (Indonesia) Rizki Amelia Pradipta | 47,713 | 13 | Indonesia (2) | |
| 17 | (Japan) Naoko Fukuman (Japan) Kurumi Yonao | 45,830 | | Japan | Reserve 3 |
| 18 | (Indonesia) Ni Ketut Mahadewi Istirani (Indonesia) Rizki Amelia Pradipta | 44,706 | | ~~Indonesia~~ | Ni Ketut Mahadewi Istirani unites with Tania Oktaviani Kusumah; Rizki Amelia Pradipta unites with Della Destiara Haris; Decline participation |
| 19 | (Denmark) Maiken Fruergaard (Denmark) Sara Thygesen | 43,868 | 14 | Denmark (1) | |
| 20 | (Thailand) Puttita Supajirakul (Thailand) Sapsiree Taerattanachai | 43,133 | 15 | Thailand (2) | |
| 21 | (Malaysia) Vivian Hoo Kah Mun (Malaysia) Yap Cheng Wen | 42,920 | 16 | Malaysia (2) | |
| 22 | (Russia) Ekaterina Bolotova (Russia) Alina Davletova | 41,633 | 17 | Russia (1) | |
| 23 | (India) Ashwini Ponnappa (India) N. Sikki Reddy | 41,390 | 18 | India (1) | |
| 24 | (China) Dong Wenjing (China) Feng Xueying | 39,490 | 44 | China (4) | Reserve 4 |
| 25 | (South Korea) Kim Hye-rin (South Korea) Baek Ha-na | 38,450 | | ~~South Korea~~ | Decline participation |
| 26 | (France) Émilie Lefel (France) Anne Tran | 38,123 | 19 | France (1) | |
| 27 | (Netherlands) Selena Piek (Netherlands) Cheryl Seinen | 37,811 | 20 | Netherlands (1) | |
| 28 | (Indonesia) Yulfira Barkah (Indonesia) Jauza Fadhila Sugiarto | 37,700 | 45 | Indonesia (3) | Reserve 5 |
| 29 | (Thailand) Chayanit Chaladchalam (Thailand) Phataimas Muenwong | 36,900 | 46 | Thailand (3) | Reserve 6 |
| 30 | (South Korea) Kim So-yeong (South Korea) Kong Hee-yong | 35,930 | 47 | South Korea (2) | Reserve 7 |
| 31 | (England) Chloe Birch (England) Lauren Smith | 35,200 | 21 | England (1) | |
| 32 | (South Korea) Kim Hye-jeong (South Korea) Kong Hee-yong | 35,090 | | South Korea | Reserve 8 |
| 33 | (Chinese Taipei) Hsu Ya-ching (Chinese Taipei) Wu Ti-jung | 34,866 | | ~~Chinese Taipei~~ | Decline participation |
| 34 | (Canada) Rachel Honderich (Canada) Kristen Tsai | 34,335 | 22 | Canada (1) | BPA highest ranked |
| 35 | (France) Delphine Delrue (France) Léa Palermo | 32,461 | 23 | France (2) | |
| 36 | (Indonesia) Agatha Imanuela (Indonesia) Siti Fadia Silva Ramadhanti | 32,260 | | Indonesia | Reserve 9 |
| 37 | (Hong Kong) Ng Tsz Yau (Hong Kong) Yuen Sin Ying | 31,538 | 24 | Hong Kong (1) | |
| 38 | (Germany) Johanna Goliszewski (Germany) Lara Käpplein | 30,713 | 25 | Germany (1) | |
| 39 | (Hong Kong) Ng Wing Yung (Hong Kong) Yeung Nga Ting | 30,300 | 26 | Hong Kong (2) | |
| 40 | (Chinese Taipei) Hsu Ya-ching (Chinese Taipei) Hu Ling-fang | 30,160 | 27 | Chinese Taipei (1) | |
| 41 | (China) Chen Lu (China) Xu Ya | 29,560 | | China | Reserve 10 |
| 42 | (India) Meghana Jakkampudi (India) Poorvisha S. Ram | 29,208 | 28 | India (2) | |
| 43 | (Germany) Linda Efler (Germany) Isabel Herttrich | 28,096 | 29 | Germany (2) | |
| 44 | (Sweden) Emma Karlsson (Sweden) Johanna Magnusson | 28,004 | 30 | Sweden (1) | |
| 45 | (Chinese Taipei) Chang Ching-hui (Chinese Taipei) Yang Ching-tun | 27,813 | 31 | Chinese Taipei (2) | |
| 46 | (China) Liu Xuanxuan (China) Xia Yuting | 27,180 | | China | Reserve 11 |
| 47 | (Japan) Misato Aratama (Japan) Akane Watanabe | 27,030 | | Japan | Reserve 12 |
| 48 | (Turkey) Bengisu Erçetin (Turkey) Nazlıcan İnci | 26,920 | 32 | Turkey (1) | |
| 49 | (China) Tang Jinhua (China) Yu Xiaohan | 26,700 | | China | Reserve 13 |
| 50 | (United States) Ariel Lee (United States) Sydney Lee | 25,850 | 33 | United States (1) | |
| 51 | (India) Pooja Dandu (India) Sanjana Santosh | 25,400 | 48 | India (3) | Reserve 14 |
| 52 | (United States) Emily Kan (United States) Isabel Zhong | 24,840 | 34 | United States (2) | |
| 53 | (Japan) Akane Araki (Japan) Riko Imai | 24,430 | | Japan | Reserve 15 |
| 54 | (India) Aparna Balan (India) Sruthi K.P | 23,620 | | India | Reserve 16 |
| 55 | (Japan) Miki Kashihara (Japan) Miyuki Kato | 23,610 | | Japan | Reserve 17 |
| 56 | (Indonesia) Febriana Dwipuji Kusuma (Indonesia) Ribka Sugiarto | 22,870 | | Indonesia | Reserve 18 |
| 57 | (Indonesia) Anggia Shitta Awanda (Indonesia) Ni Ketut Mahadewi Istirani | 22,700 | | Indonesia | Reserve 19 |
| 58 | (Indonesia) Tania Oktaviani Kusumah (Indonesia) Vania Arianti Sukoco | 21,560 | | Indonesia | Reserve 20 |
| 59 | (South Korea) Kim Hye-rin (South Korea) Kong Hee-yong | 21,253 | | South Korea | Reserve 21 |
| 60 | (Thailand) Ruethaichanok Laisuan (Thailand) Supamart Mingchua | 21,020 | | Thailand | Reserve 22 |
| 61 | (Peru) Daniela Macías (Peru) Dánica Nishimura | 20,944 | 35 | Peru (1) | |
| 62 | (China) Cao Tongwei (China) Zheng Yu | 20,420 | | China | Reserve 23 |
| 63 | (Australia) Setyana Mapasa (Australia) Gronya Somerville | 19,473 | 36 | Australia (1) | BO highest ranked |
| 64 | (Russia) Anastasiia Akchurina (Russia) Olga Morozova | 19,050 | 37 | Russia (2) | |
| 65 | (Chinese Taipei) Pai Yu-po (Chinese Taipei) Wu Ti-jung | 18,366 | | Chinese Taipei | Reserve 24 |
| 66 | (Thailand) Supissara Paewsampran (Thailand) Puttita Supajirakul | 18,320 | | Thailand | Reserve 25 |
| 67 | (Chinese Taipei) Kuo Yu-wen (Chinese Taipei) Lin Wan-ching | 18,082 | | Chinese Taipei | Reserve 26 |
| 68 | (Belgium) Lise Jaques (Belgium) Flore Vandenhoucke | 18,054 | | ~~Belgium~~ | Decline participation |
| 69 | (Indonesia) Della Destiara Haris (Indonesia) Tania Oktaviani Kusumah | 17,640 | | Indonesia | Reserve 27 |
| 70 | (Indonesia) Nita Violina Marwah (Indonesia) Putri Syaikah | 16,930 | | Indonesia | Reserve 28 |
| 71 | (Ukraine) Maryna Ilyinskaya (Ukraine) Yelyzaveta Zharka | 16,792 | 38 | Ukraine (1) | |
| 72 | (India) Rutaparna Panda (India) Arathi Sara Sunil | 16,767 | | India | Reserve 29 |
| 73 | (Hungary) Nikoletta Bukoviczki (Hungary) Daniella Gonda | 16,691 | | ~~Hungary~~ | Decline participation |
| 74 | (Egypt) Doha Hany (Egypt) Hadia Hosny | 16,500 | | ~~Egypt~~ | BCA highest ranked, Decline participation |
| 75 | (Estonia) Kati-Kreet Marran (Estonia) Helina Rüütel | 16,400 | 39 | Estonia (1) | |
| 76 | (Switzerland) Nadia Fankhauser (Netherlands) Iris Tabeling | 16,400 | 40 | Switzerland (0.5); Netherlands (1.5) | Host nation's presenter |
| 77 | (France) Vimala Hériau (France) Margot Lambert | 15,850 | | France | Reserve 30 |
| 78 | (Germany) Annabella Jäger (Germany) Stine Küspert | 15,650 | | Germany | |
| 79 | (Singapore) Citra Putri Sari Dewi (Singapore) Jin Yujia | 15,200 | | ~~Singapore~~ | Decline participation |
| 80 | (Denmark) Amalie Magelund (Denmark) Freja Ravn | 14,950 | 41 | Denmark (2) | |
| 81 | (Chinese Taipei) Chen Hsiao-huan (Chinese Taipei) Hu Ling-fang | 14,810 | | Chinese Taipei | |
| 82 | (Italy) Silvia Garino (Italy) Lisa Iversen | 14,436 | | ~~Italy~~ | Decline participation |
| 83 | (Guatemala) Diana Corleto Soto (Guatemala) Nikté Sotomayor | 14,344 | 42 | Guatemala (1) | |
| 84 | (Hong Kong) Ng Shiu Yee (Hong Kong) Wu Yi Ting | 14,330 | | Hong Kong | |
| 85 | (Czech Republic) Alžběta Bášová (Czech Republic) Michaela Fuchsová | 14,278 | 43 | Czech Republic (1) | |

=== Mixed doubles ===
Due to the phase 2 updated by BWF, the following chart is the invitation results.

Players who ranked from 1 to 8, whose association could nominate 4 pairs.
Players who ranked from 9 to 24, whose association could nominate 3 pairs.
Players who ranked from 25 to 150, whose association could nominate 2 pairs.

| Rank | Nation / Player | Points | Eligibility | | Note |
|---|---|---|---|---|---|
| 1 | (China) Zheng Siwei (China) Huang Yaqiong | 111,440 | 1 | China (1) | BA highest ranked |
| 2 | (China) Wang Yilü (China) Huang Dongping | 92,250 | 2 | China (2) | |
| 3 | (Japan) Yuta Watanabe (Japan) Arisa Higashino | 81,493 | 3 | Japan (1) | |
| 4 | (Thailand) Dechapol Puavaranukroh (Thailand) Sapsiree Taerattanachai | 76,190 | 4 | Thailand (1) | |
| 5 | (Malaysia) Chan Peng Soon (Malaysia) Goh Liu Ying | 70,640 | 5 | Malaysia (1) | |
| 6 | (South Korea) Seo Seung-jae (South Korea) Chae Yoo-jung | 62,660 | 6 | South Korea (1) | |
| 7 | (Indonesia) Hafiz Faizal (Indonesia) Gloria Emanuelle Widjaja | 61,510 | 7 | Indonesia (1) | |
| 8 | (China) He Jiting (China) Du Yue | 57,921 | 8 | China (3) | |
| 9 | (Indonesia) Praveen Jordan (Indonesia) Melati Daeva Oktavianti | 57,840 | 9 | Indonesia (2) | |
| 10 | (England) Chris Adcock (England) Gabby Adcock | 57,840 | 10 | England (1) | BE highest ranked |
| 11 | (England) Marcus Ellis (England) Lauren Smith | 56,979 | 11 | England (2) | |
| 12 | (Hong Kong) Tang Chun Man (Hong Kong) Tse Ying Suet | 55,560 | 12 | Hong Kong (1) | |
| 13 | (Malaysia) Goh Soon Huat (Malaysia) Shevon Jemie Lai | 54,120 | 13 | Malaysia (2) | |
| 14 | (Denmark) Mathias Christiansen (Denmark) Christinna Pedersen | 50,545 | | ~~Denmark~~ | Christinna Pedersen retired Decline participation |
| 15 | (Thailand) Nipitphon Phuangphuapet (Thailand) Savitree Amitrapai | 47,102 | 14 | Thailand (2) | |
| 16 | (China) Lu Kai (China) Chen Lu | 46,980 | 45 | China (4) | Reserve 1 |
| 17 | (China) Zhang Nan (China) Li Yinhui | 46,130 | | China | |
| 18 | (Chinese Taipei) Wang Chi-lin (Chinese Taipei) Lee Chia-hsin | 45,170 | | ~~Chinese Taipei~~ | Decline participation |
| 19 | (Indonesia) Rinov Rivaldy (Indonesia) Pitha Haningtyas Mentari | 44,320 | 15 | Indonesia (3) | |
| 20 | (Malaysia) Tan Kian Meng (Malaysia) Lai Pei Jing | 42,300 | 16 | Malaysia (3) | |
| 21 | (Germany) Mark Lamsfuß (Germany) Isabel Herttrich | 41,098 | 17 | Germany (1) | |
| 22 | (Japan) Kohei Gondo (Japan) Ayane Kurihara | 39,260 | 18 | Japan (2) | |
| 23 | (India) Pranav Chopra (India) N. Sikki Reddy | 38,710 | 19 | India (1) | |
| 24 | (Germany) Marvin Emil Seidel (Germany) Linda Efler | 38,630 | 20 | Germany (2) | |
| 25 | (Japan) Takuro Hoki (Japan) Wakana Nagahara | 38,190 | 46 | Japan (3) | Reserve 2 |
| 26 | (Indonesia) Ronald Alexander (Indonesia) Annisa Saufika | 37,170 | 47 | Indonesia (4) | Reserve 3 |
| 27 | (Indonesia) Alfian Eko Prasetya (Indonesia) Marsheilla Gischa Islami | 37,130 | | Indonesia | Reserve 4 |
| 28 | (India) Ashwini Ponnappa (India) Satwiksairaj Rankireddy | 36,960 | 21 | India (2) | |
| 29 | (England) Ben Lane (England) Jessica Pugh | 36,283 | 48 | England (3) | Reserve 5 |
| 30 | (Japan) Yuki Kaneko (Japan) Misaki Matsutomo | 35,670 | | Japan | Reserve 6 |
| 31 | (Indonesia) Ricky Karanda Suwardi (Indonesia) Debby Susanto | 35,540 | | ~~Indonesia~~ | Reserve 7 Debby Susanto retired |
| 32 | (Russia) Rodion Alimov (Russia) Alina Davletova | 35,274 | 22 | Russia (1) | |
| 33 | (Chinese Taipei) Lee Yang (Chinese Taipei) Hsu Ya-ching | 34,650 | | ~~Chinese Taipei~~ | Decline participation |
| 34 | (Hong Kong) Chang Tak Ching (Hong Kong) Ng Wing Yung | 33,700 | 23 | Hong Kong (2) | |
| 35 | (Malaysia) Chen Tang Jie (Malaysia) Peck Yen Wei | 32,267 | | Malaysia | Reserve 8 |
| 36 | (Russia) Evgenij Dremin (Russia) Evgenia Dimova | 31,980 | 24 | Russia (2) | |
| 37 | (France) Thom Gicquel (France) Delphine Delrue | 31,378 | 25 | France (1) | |
| 38 | (Republic of Ireland) Sam Magee (Republic of Ireland) Chloe Magee | 31,368 | 26 | Ireland (1) | |
| 39 | (China) Ou Xuanyi (China) Feng Xueying | 31,319 | | China | Reserve 9 |
| 40 | (Indonesia) Akbar Bintang Cahyono (Indonesia) Winny Oktavina Kandow | 29,520 | | Indonesia | Reserve 10 |
| 41 | (Indonesia) Tontowi Ahmad (Indonesia) Winny Oktavina Kandow | 29,105 | | Indonesia | Reserve 11 |
| 42 | (Netherlands) Robin Tabeling (Netherlands) Cheryl Seinen | 28,780 | | ~~Netherlands~~ | Robin Tabeling unites with Selena Piek, Decline participation |
| 43 | (France) Ronan Labar (France) Audrey Mittelheisser | 28,438 | | ~~France~~ | Decline participation |
| 44 | (Vietnam) Đỗ Tuấn Đức (Vietnam) Phạm Như Thảo | 27,980 | 27 | Vietnam (1) | |
| 45 | (India) Rohan Kapoor (India) Kuhoo Garg | 27,730 | | India | Reserve 12 |
| 46 | (Denmark) Mikkel Mikkelsen (Denmark) Mai Surrow | 27,530 | | ~~Denmark~~ | Decline participation |
| 47 | (Denmark) Niclas Nøhr (Denmark) Sara Thygesen | 27,070 | 28 | Denmark (1) | |
| 48 | (India) Saurabh Sharma (India) Anoushka Parikh | 26,960 | | India | Reserve 13 |
| 49 | (Netherlands) Jacco Arends (Netherlands) Selena Piek | 26,910 | | ~~Netherlands~~ | Jacco Arends retired, Decline participation |
| 50 | (Hong Kong) Lee Chun Hei (Hong Kong) Chau Hoi Wah | 26,530 | | Hong Kong | Reserve 14 |
| 51 | (Canada) Joshua Hurlburt-Yu (Canada) Josephine Wu | 24,821 | 29 | Canada (1) | BPA highest ranked |
| 52 | (Singapore) Danny Bawa Chrisnanta (Singapore) Tan Wei Han | 24,678 | 30 | Singapore (1) | |
| 53 | (Netherlands) Robin Tabeling (Netherlands) Selena Piek | 24,566 | 31 | Netherlands (1) | |
| 54 | (China) Ren Xiangyu (China) Zhou Chaomin | 24,310 | | China | |
| 55 | (Malaysia) Hoo Pang Ron (Malaysia) Cheah Yee See | 24,273 | | Malaysia | |
| 56 | (Denmark) Mathias Bay-Smidt (Denmark) Rikke Søby Hansen | 22,140 | 32 | Denmark (2) | |
| 57 | (India) Juhi Dewangan (India) Venkat Gaurav Prasad | 21,860 | | India | |
| 58 | (Japan) Takuro Hoki (Japan) Koharu Yonemoto | 21,530 | | Japan | |
| 59 | (India) Arjun M.R. (India) K. Maneesha | 21,440 | | India | |
| 60 | (Chinese Taipei) Chang Ko-chi (Chinese Taipei) Cheng Chi-ya | 21,420 | | ~~Chinese Taipei~~ | Decline participation |
| 61 | (Poland) Paweł Śmiłowski (Poland) Magdalena Świerczyńska | 21,318 | 33 | Poland (1) | |
| 62 | (South Korea) Kim Hwi-tae (South Korea) Kim Hye-jeong | 21,040 | | ~~South Korea~~ | Decline participation |
| 63 | (India) Utkarsh Arora (India) Karishma Wadkar | 20,250 | | India | |
| 64 | (Thailand) Supak Jomkoh (Thailand) Supissara Paewsampran | 19,370 | | Thailand | |
| 65 | (Hong Kong) Tang Chun Man (Hong Kong) Ng Tsz Yau | 18,963 | | Hong Kong | |
| 66 | (Bulgaria) Alex Vlaar (Bulgaria) Mariya Mitsova | 18,740 | 34 | Bulgaria (1) | |
| 67 | (Japan) Tadayuki Urai (Japan) Rena Miyaura | 18,530 | | Japan | |
| 68 | (Hong Kong) Mak Hee Chun (Hong Kong) Yeung Nga Ting | 18,500 | | Hong Kong | |
| 69 | (Chinese Taipei) Wang Chi-lin (Chinese Taipei) Cheng Chi-ya | 18,460 | 35 | Chinese Taipei (1) | |
| 70 | (United States) Mathew Fogarty (United States) Isabel Zhong | 17,930 | 36 | United States (1) | |
| 71 | (Chinese Taipei) Po Li-wei (Chinese Taipei) Chang Ching-hui | 17,670 | | Chinese Taipei | |
| 72 | (Scotland) Adam Hall (Scotland) Julie MacPherson | 17,420 | 37 | Scotland (1) | |
| 73 | (Israel) Misha Zilberman (Israel) Svetlana Zilberman | 17,361 | 38 | Israel (1) | |
| 74 | (Czech Republic) Jakub Bitman (Czech Republic) Alžběta Bášová | 17,166 | 39 | Czech Republic (1) | |
| 75 | (Malaysia) Mohamad Arif Abdul Latif (Indonesia) Rusydina Antardayu Riodingin | 17,100 | | Malaysia; Indonesia | |
| 76 | (Singapore) Bimo Adi Prakoso (Singapore) Jin Yujia | 16,140 | | ~~Singapore~~ | Decline participation |
| 77 | (Denmark) Joachim Fischer Nielsen (Denmark) Alexandra Bøje | 16,110 | | Denmark | |
| 78 | (Russia) Denis Grachev (Russia) Ekaterina Bolotova | 16,090 | | Russia | |
| 79 | (Ukraine) Valeriy Atrashchenkov (Ukraine) Yelyzaveta Zharka | 15,911 | 40 | Ukraine (1) | |
| 80 | (Hong Kong) Yeung Ming Nok (Hong Kong) Ng Tsz Yau | 15,870 | | Hong Kong | |
| 81 | (Switzerland) Oliver Schaller (Switzerland) Céline Burkart | 15,740 | 41 | Switzerland (1) | Host nation's presenter |
| 82 | (Canada) Nyl Yakura (Canada) Kristen Tsai | 15,640 | 42 | Canada (2) | |
| 83 | (Indonesia) Renaldi Samosir (Indonesia) Hediana Julimarbela | 15,470 | | Indonesia | |
| 84 | (England) Matthew Clare (England) Victoria Williams | 14,990 | | England | |
| 85 | (England) Tom Wolfenden (England) Jenny Moore | 14,780 | | England | |
| 86 | (Hong Kong) Mak Hee Chun (Hong Kong) Chau Hoi Wah | 14,627 | | Hong Kong | |
| 87 | (Chinese Taipei) Lu Ching-yao (Chinese Taipei) Lee Chia-hsin | 14,610 | | Chinese Taipei | |
| 88 | (Denmark) Mathias Thyrri (Denmark) Elisa Melgaard | 14,540 | | Denmark | |
| 89 | (Chinese Taipei) Lee Yang (Chinese Taipei) Yang Ching-tun | 14,160 | | Chinese Taipei | |
| 90 | (Indonesia) Zachariah Josiahno Sumanti (Indonesia) Angelica Wiratama | 14,050 | | Indonesia | |
| 91 | (Chinese Taipei) Tseng Min-hao (Chinese Taipei) Hsieh Pei-shan | 13,803 | | Chinese Taipei | |
| 92 | (Finland) Anton Kaisti (Finland) Inalotta Suutarinen | 13,718 | | ~~Finland~~ | Decline participation |
| 93 | (South Korea) Kim Won-ho (South Korea) Baek Ha-na | 13,500 | | ~~South Korea~~ | Decline participation |
| 94 | (Jordan) Bahaedeen Ahmad Alshannik (Jordan) Domou Amro | 13,480 | 43 | Jordan (1) | |
| 95 | (India) Shivam Sharma (India) Poorvisha S. Ram | 13,170 | | India | |
| 95 | (Denmark) Joel Eipe (Denmark) Mette Poulsen | 13,170 | | Denmark | |
| 97 | (Indonesia) Yantoni Edy Saputra (Indonesia) Marsheilla Gischa Islami | 13,120 | | Indonesia | |
| 98 | (Denmark) Lasse Mølhede (Denmark) Sara Lundgaard | 13,020 | | Denmark | |
| 99 | (Russia) Rodion Kargaev (Russia) Viktoriia Vorobeva | 12,990 | | Russia | |
| 100 | (Indonesia) Ricky Karanda Suwardi (Indonesia) Pia Zebadiah Bernadeth | 12,960 | | Indonesia | |
| 101 | (Netherlands) Ruben Jille (Netherlands) Imke van der Aar | 12,900 | | Netherlands | |
| 102 | (Spain) Alberto Zapico (Spain) Lorena Uslé | 12,557 | | Spain | |
| 103 | (Indonesia) Andika Ramadiansyah (Indonesia) Bunga Fitriani Romadhini | 12,280 | | Indonesia | |
| 104 | (Germany) Patrick Scheiel (Germany) Franziska Volkmann | 12,230 | | Germany | |
| 105 | (Thailand) Parinyawat Thongnuam (Thailand) Kittipak Dubthuk | 12,200 | | Thailand | |
| 106 | (Brazil) Fabricio Farias (Brazil) Jaqueline Lima | 12,060 | | Brazil | |
| 107 | (Japan) Yugo Kobayashi (Japan) Misaki Matsutomo | 11,600 | | Japan | |
| 108 | (Australia) Simon Leung (Australia) Gronya Somerville | 11,590 | 44 | Australia (1) | BO highest ranked |
| 109 | (Chinese Taipei) Lu Ching-yao (Chinese Taipei) Hu Ling-fang | 10,930 | | Chinese Taipei | |
| 110 | (India) S. Sunjith (India) Sruthi K.P | 10,790 | | India | |
| 111 | (Singapore) Terry Hee Yong Kai (Singapore) Citra Putri Sari Dewi | 10,660 | | Singapore | |
| 112 | (England) Callum Hemming (England) Liew Fee Teng | 10,640 | | England | |
| 113 | (Chinese Taipei) Chang Ko-chi (Chinese Taipei) Lee Chih-chen | 10,490 | | Chinese Taipei | |
| 114 | (Egypt) Ahmed Salah (Egypt) Hadia Hosny | 10,400 | | ~~Egypt~~ | BCA highest ranked, Decline participation |
