= 2015 Denmark Super Series Premier =

Tournament details
- Dates: 13 October 2015 – 18 October 2015
- Level: Super Series Premier
- Total prize money: US$650,000
- Venue: Odense Sports Park
- Location: Odense, Denmark

Champions
- Men's singles: (China) Chen Long
- Women's singles: (China) Li Xuerui
- Men's doubles: (South Korea) Lee Yong-dae (South Korea) Yoo Yeon-seong
- Women's doubles: (South Korea) Jung Kyung-eun (South Korea) Shin Seung-chan
- Mixed doubles: (South Korea) Ko Sung-hyun (South Korea) Kim Ha-na

The 2015 Denmark Super Series Premier was the ninth Super Series badminton tournament of the 2015 BWF Super Series. The tournament took place in Odense, Denmark from October 13–18, 2015 and had a total prize of $650,000. A qualification was held to fill four places in all five disciplines of the main draws.

== Men's singles ==
=== Seeds ===
1. (China) Chen Long (champion)
2. (Denmark) Jan Ø. Jørgensen (quarterfinals)
3. (China) Lin Dan (quarterfinals)
4. (Japan) Kento Momota (quarterfinals)
5. (India) Srikanth Kidambi (second round)
6. (Denmark) Viktor Axelsen (semifinals)
7. (Chinese Taipei) Chou Tien-chen (semifinals)
8. (India) Parupalli Kashyap (first round)
Qualification

=== Qualifying draw ===
==== Qualifier 1 ====
First Round
PFR	(Denmark) R Messerschmidt	21	21
(Germany) F Roth	19	18
(Estonia) R Must	19	22	21
(Denmark) J Persson	21	20	14

Second Round
PFR	(Denmark) R Messerschmidt	16	12
(Estonia) R Must	21	21

==== Qualifier 2 ====
First Round
4	(Japan) K Tago	21	17	16
PFR	(Denmark) K Bruun	11	21	21
(Denmark) R Fladberg	21	21
(Norway) M Myhre	15	16

Second Round
PFR	(Denmark) K Bruun	20	20
(Denmark) R Fladberg	22	22

==== Qualifier 3 ====
First Round
(Czech Republic) P Koukal	15	11
(Denmark) E Holst	21	21
(Denmark) F Quach	21	21
PFR	(Scotland) A Casey	9	10

Second Round
(Denmark) E Holst	21	21
(Denmark) F Quach	16	10

==== Qualifier 4 ====
First Round
(Denmark) C Lind Thomsen	21	17	21
(Indonesia) A K Tedjono	11	21	17
(Denmark) S Rasmussen	21	21
PFR	(France) J Deschamp	9	11

Second Round
(Denmark) C Lind Thomsen	21	21
(Denmark) S Rasmussen	19	16

=== Top half ===
First Round
1	(China) Chen L	21	22
(Hong Kong) Wong W K	12	20
PFQ	(South Korea) Lee D-k	16	17
(Denmark) H-K Vittinghus	21	21
8	(India) K Parupalli	14	15
(Malaysia) Lee C W	21	21
(Hong Kong) Wei N	14	21	21
Q3	(Denmark) E Holst	21	19	15
3	(China) Lin D	21	21
Q1	(Estonia) R Must	15	18
(Hong Kong) Hu Y	21	17	21
PFQ	(Republic of Ireland) S Evans	19	21	10
6	(Denmark) V Axelsen	21	21
(England) R Ouseph	17	19
(South Korea) Son W-h	21	22
(Hong Kong) Ng K L	17	20

Second Round
1	(China) Chen L	21	21
(Denmark) H-K Vittinghus	11	9
(Malaysia) Lee C W	18	19
(Hong Kong) Wei N	21	21
3	(China) Lin D	19	21	21
(Hong Kong) Hu Y	21	10	16
6	(Denmark) V Axelsen	21	21
(South Korea) Son W-h	15	6

Quarterfinals
1	(China) Chen L	13	21	21
(Hong Kong) Wei N	21	13	16
3	(China) Lin D	8	7
6	(Denmark) V Axelsen	21	21

Semifinals
1	(China) Chen L	15	21	21
6	(Denmark) V Axelsen	21	17	16

=== Bottom half ===
First Round
(France) B Leverdez	21	2	19
(China) Tian HW	19	21	21
Q4	(Denmark) C L Thomsen	17	12
7	(Chinese Taipei) Chou T-c	21	21
(India) H. S. Prannoy	21	21	15
(Chinese Taipei) Hsu J-h	23	19	21
(Thailand) B Ponsana	21	14	19
4	(Japan) K Momota	17	21	21
(Indonesia) T Sugiarto	21	21
(Japan) S Sasaki	11	12
PFQ	(India) A Jayaram	10	14
5	(India) K Srikanth	21	21
Q2	(Denmark) R Fladberg	16	19
(Indonesia) D H Rumbaka	21	21
(China) Wang ZM	17	9
2	(Denmark) J Ø Jørgensen	21	21

Second Round
(China) Tian HW	9	21	18
7	(Chinese Taipei) Chou T-c	21	14	21
(Chinese Taipei) Hsu J-h	21	15	16
4	(Japan) K Momota	18	21	21
(Indonesia) T Sugiarto	21	21
5	(India) K Srikanth	15	17
(Indonesia) D H Rumbaka	21	15	19
2	(Denmark) J Ø Jørgensen	12	21	21

Quarterfinals
7	(Chinese Taipei) Chou T-c	21	20	21
4	(Japan) K Momota	19	22	15
(Indonesia) T Sugiarto	21	21
2	(Denmark) J Ø Jørgensen	19	19

Semifinals
7	(Chinese Taipei) Chou T-c	8	20
(Indonesia) T Sugiarto	21	22

=== Finals ===
Semifinals
1	(China) Chen Long	15	21	21
6	(Denmark) Viktor Axelsen	21	17	16
7	(Chinese Taipei) Chou Tien-chen	8	20
(Indonesia) Tommy Sugiarto	21	22

Final
1	(China) Chen Long	21	21
(Indonesia) Tommy Sugiarto	12	12

== Women's singles ==
=== Seeds ===
1. (India) Saina Nehwal (second round)
2. (Spain) Carolina Marín (semifinals)
3. (Chinese Taipei) Tai Tzu-ying (second round)
4. (China) Li Xuerui (champion)
5. (China) Wang Shixian (quarterfinals)
6. (China) Wang Yihan (quarterfinals)
7. (South Korea) Sung Ji-hyun (semifinals)
8. (Japan) Nozomi Okuhara (second round)
Qualification

=== Qualifying draw ===
==== Qualifier 1 ====
First Round
1	(Denmark) L Kjaersfeldt	P	M	D
Bye
(Finland) A Mikkela	21	22	22
(Denmark) C Martens	10	24	20

Second Round
Bye
(Finland) A Mikkela

==== Qualifier 2 ====
First Round
3	(Russia) K Polikarpova	21	21
(Sweden) B Pirzamanbein	2	12
(Latvia) M Radovska	8	11
(Chinese Taipei) Chen H-h	21	21

Second Round
3	(Russia) K Polikarpova	24	22
(Chinese Taipei) Chen H-h	22	20

==== Qualifier 3 ====
First Round
(Slovakia) M Repiska	12	21	16
(Denmark) J Finne-Ipsen	21	17	21
(Estonia) L Vana	12	8
4	(Denmark) A T Madsen	21	21

Second Round
(Denmark) J Finne-Ipsen	10	13
4	(Denmark) A T Madsen	21	21

==== Qualifier 4 ====
First Round
(New Zealand) A Rankin	11	20
(Denmark) M Poulsen	21	22
(Estonia) K Tolmoff	13	16
2	(Republic of Ireland) C Magee	21	21

Second Round
(Denmark) M Poulsen	21	22
2	(Republic of Ireland) C Magee	11	20

=== Top half ===
First Round
1	(India) S Nehwal	23	14	21
(Thailand) B Ongbumrungpan	21	21	18
(Thailand) P Buranaprasertsuk	10	4
(Japan) M Mitani	21	21
7	(South Korea) Sung J-h	18	21	21
(Japan) S Takahashi	21	12	4
(Hong Kong) Cheung N Y	21	10
(Germany) K Schnaase	13	7^{r}
4	(China) Li XR	10	21	21
(Indonesia) L Fanetri	21	19	11
(Hong Kong) Yip P Y	16	21
(Japan) A Yamaguchi	21	23
5	(China) Wang SX	21	21
(Scotland) K Gilmour	8	12
PFQ	(Denmark) L Kjaersfeldt	21	21
(Chinese Taipei) Pai Y-p	15	17

Second Round
1	(India) S Nehwal	18	13
(Japan) M Mitani	21	21
7	(South Korea) Sung J-h	21	21
(Hong Kong) Cheung N Y	16	14
4	(China) Li XR	21	21
(Japan) A Yamaguchi	16	19
5	(China) Wang SX	21	21
PFQ	(Denmark) L Kjaersfeldt	14	12

Quarterfinals
(Japan) M Mitani	13	18
7	(South Korea) Sung J-h	21	21
4	(China) Li XR	23	21
5	(China) Wang SX	21	17

Semifinals
7	(South Korea) Sung J-h	8	22	10
4	(China) Li XR	21	20	21

=== Bottom half ===
First Round
(Japan) Y Hashimoto	21	21
(United States) I Wang	15	18
(South Korea) Bae Y-j	9	22	12
6	(China) Wang YH	21	20	21
(Indonesia) M F Kusumastuti	13	11
(India) P. V. Sindhu	21	21
Q1	(Finland) A Mikkela	8	9
3	(Chinese Taipei) Tai T-y	21	21
(Canada) M Li	19	21	21
Q3	(Denmark) A T Madsen	21	19	13
Q2	(Russia) K Polikarpova	7	7
8	(Japan) N Okuhara	21	21
(Chinese Taipei) Hsu Y-c	20	15
Q4	(Denmark) M Poulsen	22	21
(China) Sun Y	10	15
2	(Spain) C Marín	21	21

Second Round
(Japan) Y Hashimoto	10	9
6	(China) Wang YH	21	21
(India) P. V. Sindhu	21	21
3	(Chinese Taipei) Tai T-y	12	15
(Canada) M Li	8	22	26
8	(Japan) N Okuhara	21	20	24
Q4	(Denmark) M Poulsen	19	13
2	(Spain) C Marín	21	21

Quarterfinals
6	(China) Wang YH	18	19
(India) P. V. Sindhu	21	21
(Canada) M Li	14	11
2	(Spain) C Marín	21	21

Semifinals
(India) P. V. Sindhu	21	18	21
2	(Spain) C Marín	15	21	17

=== Finals ===
Semifinals
7	(South Korea) Sung Ji-hyun	8	22	10
4	(China) Li Xuerui	21	20	21
(India) P. V. Sindhu	21	18	21
2	(Spain) Carolina Marín	15	21	17

Final
4	(China) Li Xuerui	21	21
(India) P. V. Sindhu	19	12

== Men's doubles ==
=== Seeds ===
1. (South Korea) Lee Yong-dae / Yoo Yeon-seong (champion)
2. (Indonesia) Mohammad Ahsan / Hendra Setiawan (second round)
3. (China) Fu Haifeng / Zhang Nan (semifinals)
4. (Denmark) Mathias Boe / Carsten Mogensen (semifinals)
5. (Japan) Hiroyuki Endo / Kenichi Hayakawa (second round)
6. (China) Chai Biao / Hong Wei (quarterfinals)
7. (China) Liu Xiaolong / Qiu Zihan (quarterfinals)
8. (Chinese Taipei) Lee Sheng-mu / Tsai Chia-hsin (quarterfinals)
Qualification

=== Qualifying draw ===
==== Qualifier 1 ====
First Round
1	(Denmark) M Christiansen (Denmark) D Daugaard	P	M	D
Bye
(Denmark) N Mathiasen (Denmark) L Moelhede	21	14	19
(Germany) M Lamsfuß (Germany) M E Seidel	17	21	21

Second Round
Bye
(Germany) M Lamsfuß (Germany) M E Seidel

==== Qualifier 2 ====
First Round
3	(Chinese Taipei) Lin C-y (Chinese Taipei) Wu H-l
Bye
(Denmark) K Antonsen (Denmark) F Søgaard Mortensen	19	18
(China) Liu C (China) Lu K	21	21

Second Round
3	(Chinese Taipei) Lin C-y (Chinese Taipei) Wu H-l	28	19	18
(China) Liu C (China) Lu K	26	21	21

==== Qualifier 3 ====
First Round
(Denmark) A Bond (Denmark) J Eipe	21	21
(Hong Kong) Alan Chan Y L (Hong Kong) Reginald Lee C H	14	11
(Denmark) S Gravholt (Denmark) N Overgaard	16	21	21
4	(Chinese Taipei) Liao M-c (Chinese Taipei) Tseng M-h	21	14	19

Second Round
(Denmark) A Bond (Denmark) J Eipe	16	21	15
(Denmark) S Gravholt (Denmark) N Overgaard	21	14	21

==== Qualifier 4 ====
First Round
(Denmark) P Buhl (Denmark) K Knudsen	15	12
(France) B Kersaudy (France) G Mittelheisser	21	21
Bye
2	(Belgium) M Dierickx (Belgium) F Golinski

Second Round
(France) B Kersaudy (France) G Mittelheisser	21	21
2	(Belgium) M Dierickx (Belgium) F Golinski	8	10

=== Top half ===
First Round
1	(South Korea) Lee Y-d (South Korea) Yoo Y-s	21	21
(Denmark) M Conrad-Petersen (Denmark) M Pieler Kolding	16	13
(Germany) M Schwenger (Germany) J Zurwonne	19	14
(South Korea) Ko S-h (South Korea) Shin B-c	21	21
7	(China) Liu XL (China) Qiu ZH	21	21
(England) A Ellis (England) P Mills	13	12
(France) B Careme (France) R Labar	14	14
(China) Li JH (China) Liu YC	21	21
3	(China) Fu HF (China) Zhang N	21	21
Q3	(Denmark) S Gravholt (Denmark) N Overgaard	12	15
(China) Wang YL (China) Zhang W	10	14
(Chinese Taipei) Chen H-l (Chinese Taipei) Wang C-l	21	21
8	(Chinese Taipei) Lee S-m (Chinese Taipei) Tsai C-h	21	27
Q1	(Germany) M Lamsfuß (Germany) M E Seidel	18	25
(England) M Ellis (England) C Langridge	22	13
(India) M Attri (India) B S Reddy	24	21

Second Round
1	(South Korea) Lee Y-d (South Korea) Yoo Y-s	21	21
(South Korea) Ko S-h (South Korea) Shin B-c	16	19
7	(China) Liu XL (China) Qiu ZH	15	21	25
(China) Li JH (China) Liu YC	21	15	23
3	(China) Fu HF (China) Zhang N	21	21
(Chinese Taipei) Chen H-l (Chinese Taipei) Wang C-l	17	11
8	(Chinese Taipei) Lee S-m (Chinese Taipei) Tsai C-h	21	20	21
(India) M Attri (India) B S Reddy	19	22	19

Quarterfinals
1	(South Korea) Lee Y-d (South Korea) Yoo Y-s	21	21
7	(China) Liu XL (China) Qiu ZH	18	16
3	(China) Fu HF (China) Zhang N	21	21
8	(Chinese Taipei) Lee S-m (Chinese Taipei) Tsai C-h	13	18

Semifinals
1	(South Korea) Lee Y-d (South Korea) Yoo Y-s	21	21
3	(China) Fu HF (China) Zhang N	17	14

=== Bottom half ===
First Round
(South Korea) Kim G-j (South Korea) Kim S-r	21	21
(Japan) H Hashimoto (Japan) N Hirata	16	15
(Denmark) K Astrup (Denmark) A Skaarup Rasmussen	20	19
6	(China) Chai B (China) Hong W	22	21
(Germany) M Fuchs (Germany) J Schöttler	19	15
(Indonesia) A Pratama (Indonesia) R K Suwardi	21	21
(Malaysia) Goh V S (Malaysia) Tan W K	15	21	20
4	(Denmark) M Boe (Denmark) C Mogensen	21	19	22
PFQ	(Denmark) M Christiansen (Denmark) D Daugaard	17	11
(Russia) V Ivanov (Russia) I Sozonov	21	21
Q4	(France) B Kersaudy (France) G Mittelheisser	18	21	12
5	(Japan) H Endo (Japan) K Hayakawa	21	16	21
Q2	(China) Liu C (China) Lu K	21	21
(Japan) T Kamura (Japan) K Sonoda	18	14
(Poland) A Cwalina (Poland) P Wacha	21	16	17
2	(Indonesia) M Ahsan (Indonesia) H Setiawan	11	21	21

Second Round
(South Korea) Kim G-j (South Korea) Kim S-r	21	17	16
6	(China) Chai B (China) Hong W	12	21	21
(Indonesia) A Pratama (Indonesia) R K Suwardi	19	16
4	(Denmark) M Boe (Denmark) C Mogensen	21	21
(Russia) V Ivanov (Russia) I Sozonov	21	22
5	(Japan) H Endo (Japan) K Hayakawa	10	20
Q2	(China) Liu C (China) Lu K	25	23
2	(Indonesia) M Ahsan (Indonesia) H Setiawan	23	21

Quarterfinals
6	(China) Chai B (China) Hong W	21	21
4	(Denmark) M Boe (Denmark) C Mogensen	23	23
(Russia) V Ivanov (Russia) I Sozonov	19	18
Q2	(China) Liu C (China) Lu K	21	21

Semifinals
4	(Denmark) M Boe (Denmark) C Mogensen	20	21	17
Q2	(China) Liu C (China) Lu K	22	11	21

=== Finals ===
Semifinals
1	(South Korea) Lee Yong-dae (South Korea) Yoo Yeon-seong	21	21
3	(China) Fu Haifeng (China) Zhang Nan	17	14
4	(Denmark) Mathias Boe (Denmark) Carsten Mogensen	20	21	17
Q2	(China) Liu Cheng (China) Lu Kai	22	11	21

Final
1	(South Korea) Lee Yong-dae (South Korea) Yoo Yeon-seong	21	21
Q2	(China) Liu Cheng (China) Lu Kai	8	14

== Women's doubles ==
=== Seeds ===
1. (Japan) Misaki Matsutomo / Ayaka Takahashi (second round)
2. (China) Luo Ying / Luo Yu (quarterfinals)
3. (Denmark) Christinna Pedersen / Kamilla Rytter Juhl (quarterfinals)
4. (China) Wang Xiaoli / Yu Yang (withdrawn)
5. (China) Tian Qing / Zhao Yunlei (final)
6. (Indonesia) Nitya Krishinda Maheswari / Greysia Polii (first round)
7. (Japan) Reika Kakiiwa / Miyuki Maeda (semifinals)
8. (China) Ma Jin / Tang Yuanting (semifinals)
Qualification

=== Qualifying draw ===
==== Qualifier 1 ====
First Round
1	(Thailand) C Chaladchalam (Thailand) P Muenwong	P	M	D
Bye
(South Korea) Jung K-e (South Korea) Shin S-c	21	21
(Denmark) E Juul Moller (Denmark) C Sentow	5	11

Second Round
Bye
(South Korea) Jung K-e (South Korea) Shin S-c

==== Qualifier 2 ====
First Round
4	(France) A Fontaine (France) A Tran
Bye
(Denmark) S Lundgaard (Denmark) D S Hansen	w	/	o
(Denmark) A Madsen (Denmark) I Nielsen

Second Round
4	(France) A Fontaine (France) A Tran	17	21
(Denmark) A Madsen (Denmark) I Nielsen	21	23

==== Qualifier 3 ====
First Round
(South Korea) Chang Y-n (South Korea) Lee S-h	21	21
(Denmark) C Martens (Denmark) J Van Zaane	6	9
Bye
3	(Denmark) M Fruergaard (Denmark) S Thygesen

Second Round
(South Korea) Chang Y-n (South Korea) Lee S-h	22	21
(Denmark) M Fruergaard (Denmark) S Thygesen	20	9

==== Qualifier 4 ====
First Round
(Denmark) C Finne-Ipsen (Denmark) J Finne-Ipsen	17	21	19
(Germany) L Efler (Germany) L Kaepplein	21	16	21
Bye
2	(France) M Batomene (France) E Lefel	P	M	D

Second Round
(Germany) L Efler (Germany) L Kaepplein
Bye

=== Top half ===
First Round
1	(Japan) M Matsutomo (Japan) A Takahashi	23	21
(South Korea) Go A-r (South Korea) Yoo H-w	21	13
Q1	(South Korea) Jung K-e (South Korea) Shin S-c	21	21
(South Korea) Eom H-w (South Korea) Kim H-n	18	17
6	(Indonesia) N K Maheswari (Indonesia) G Polii	13	14
Q3	(South Korea) Chang Y-n (South Korea) Lee S-h	21	21
(China) Bao YX (China) Zhong QX	15	15
(South Korea) Chae Y-j (South Korea) Kim S-y	21	21
PFQ	(Thailand) C Chaladchalam (Thailand) P Muenwong	15	12
(Japan) N Fukuman (Japan) K Yonao	21	21
(Germany) J Goliszewski (Germany) C Nelte	14	15
(Hong Kong) Poon L Y (Hong Kong) Tse Y S	21	21
7	(Japan) R Kakiiwa (Japan) M Maeda	21	21
(India) J Gutta (India) A Ponnappa	19	18
Q2	(Denmark) A Madsen (Denmark) I Nielsen	30	15	14
(Chinese Taipei) Hsieh P-c (Chinese Taipei) Wu T-j	29	21	21

Second Round
1	(Japan) M Matsutomo (Japan) A Takahashi	17	13
Q1	(South Korea) Jung K-e (South Korea) Shin S-c	21	21
Q3	(South Korea) Chang Y-n (South Korea) Lee S-h	21	23
(South Korea) Chae Y-j (South Korea) Kim S-y	11	21
(Japan) N Fukuman (Japan) K Yonao	15	21	14
(Hong Kong) Poon L Y (Hong Kong) Tse Y S	21	15	21
7	(Japan) R Kakiiwa (Japan) M Maeda	21	21
(Chinese Taipei) Hsieh P-c (Chinese Taipei) Wu T-j	16	10

Quarterfinals
Q1	(South Korea) Jung K-e (South Korea) Shin S-c	21	21
Q3	(South Korea) Chang Y-n (South Korea) Lee S-h	18	19
(Hong Kong) Poon L Y (Hong Kong) Tse Y S	21	14	16
7	(Japan) R Kakiiwa (Japan) M Maeda	18	21	21

Semifinals
Q1	(South Korea) Jung K-e (South Korea) Shin S-c	21	21
7	(Japan) R Kakiiwa (Japan) M Maeda	11	15

=== Bottom half ===
First Round
(Bulgaria) G Stoeva (Bulgaria) S Stoeva	21	21
(Canada) A Bruce (Canada) P Chan	15	11
PFQ	(France) M Batomene (France) E Lefel	5	17
5	(China) Tian Q (China) Zhao YL	21	21
(England) H Olver (England) L Smith	11	20
(Malaysia) Vivian Hoo K M (Malaysia) Woon K W	21	22
(China) Huang YQ (China) Tang JH	21	22	15
3	(Denmark) C Pedersen (Denmark) K Rytter Juhl	16	24	21
(Germany) I Herttrich (Germany) B Michels	14	21
(Chinese Taipei) Hsu Y-c (Chinese Taipei) Pai Y-p	21	23
(Malaysia) A A Anscelly (Malaysia) Soong F C	17	23	19
8	(China) Ma J (China) Tang YT	21	21	21
Q4	(Germany) L Efler (Germany) L Kaepplein	11	15
(Thailand) J Kittiharakul (Thailand) R Prajongjai	21	21
(Netherlands) E Muskens (Netherlands) S Piek	17	18
2	(China) Luo Y (China) Luo Y	21	21

Second Round
(Bulgaria) G Stoeva (Bulgaria) S Stoeva	19	10
5	(China) Tian Q (China) Zhao YL	21	21
(Malaysia) Vivian Hoo K M (Malaysia) Woon K W	16	13
3	(Denmark) C Pedersen (Denmark) K Rytter Juhl	21	21
(Chinese Taipei) Hsu Y-c (Chinese Taipei) Pai Y-p	12	11
8	(China) Ma J (China) Tang YT	21	21
(Thailand) J Kittiharakul (Thailand) R Prajongjai	21	15	9
2	(China) Luo Y (China) Luo Y	17	21	21

Quarterfinals
5	(China) Tian Q (China) Zhao YL	22	21
3	(Denmark) C Pedersen (Denmark) K Rytter Juhl	20	19
8	(China) Ma J (China) Tang YT	21	20	21
2	(China) Luo Y (China) Luo Y	19	22	7

Semifinals
5	(China) Tian Q (China) Zhao YL	21	21
8	(China) Ma J (China) Tang YT	14	15

=== Finals ===
Semifinals
Q1	(South Korea) Jung Kyung-eun (South Korea) Shin Seung-chan	21	21
7	(Japan) Reika Kakiiwa (Japan) Miyuki Maeda	11	15
5	(China) Tian Qing (China) Zhao Yunlei	21	21
8	(China) Ma Jin (China) Tang Yuanting	14	15

Final
Q1	(South Korea) Jung Kyung-eun (South Korea) Shin Seung-chan	w	/	o
5	(China) Tian Qing (China) Zhao Yunlei

== Mixed doubles ==
=== Seeds ===
1. (China) Zhang Nan / Zhao Yunlei (second round)
2. (Indonesia) Tantowi Ahmad / Liliyana Natsir (final)
3. (China) Xu Chen / Ma Jin (quarterfinals)
4. (China) Liu Cheng / Bao Yixin (semifinals)
5. (Denmark) Joachim Fischer Nielsen / Christinna Pedersen (semifinals)
6. (England) Chris Adcock / Gabrielle Adcock (quarterfinals)
7. (South Korea) Ko Sung-hyun / Kim Ha-na (champion)
8. (China) Lu Kai / Huang Yaqiong (quarterfinals)
Qualification

=== Qualifying draw ===
==== Qualifier 1 ====
First Round
1	(Sweden) J Nordh (Sweden) E Fabbeke	20	18
(Denmark) S Gravholt (Denmark) M Fruergaard	22	21
PFR	(Denmark) M E Christensen (Denmark) D S Hansen	10	11
(South Korea) Yoo Y-s (South Korea) Chang Y-n	21	21

Second Round
(Denmark) S Gravholt (Denmark) M Fruergaard	21	18	15
(South Korea) Yoo Y-s (South Korea) Chang Y-n	14	21	21

==== Qualifier 2 ====
First Round
4	(Denmark) M Christiansen (Denmark) L Grebak	22	21	15
(Japan) K Kazuno (Japan) A Kurihara	24	14	21
(Germany) M E Seidel (Germany) L Efler	21	21
(France) B Kersaudy (France) L Palermo	15	19

Second Round
(Japan) K Kazuno (Japan) A Kurihara	21	21
(Germany) M E Seidel (Germany) L Efler	18	16

==== Qualifier 3 ====
First Round
(Poland) R Mateusiak (Poland) N Zieba	22	21	20
(Sweden) N Ruponen (Sweden) A Hogstrom	24	10	22
(Chinese Taipei) Wu H-l (Chinese Taipei) Hsieh P-c	17	22	16
3	(South Korea) Choi S-g (South Korea) Eom H-w	21	20	21

Second Round
(Sweden) N Ruponen (Sweden) A Hogstrom	15	11
3	(South Korea) Choi S-g (South Korea) Eom H-w	21	21

==== Qualifier 4 ====
First Round
(Chinese Taipei) Lin C-y (Chinese Taipei) Wu T-j	23	21
(Germany) M Lamsfuss (Germany) I Herttrich	21	17
(Denmark) K Antonsen (Denmark) A Madsen	19	17
2	(South Korea) Lee Y-d (South Korea) Lee S-h	21	21

Second Round
(Chinese Taipei) Lin C-y (Chinese Taipei) Wu T-j	16	21	14
2	(South Korea) Lee Y-d (South Korea) Lee S-h	21	7	21

=== Top half ===
First Round
1	(China) Zhang N (China) Zhao YL	21	21
(Indonesia) R Widianto (Indonesia) R P Dili	15	19
(Japan) K Hayakawa (Japan) M Matsutomo	14	21
(South Korea) Shin B-c (South Korea) Chae Y-j	21	23
5	(Denmark) J Fischer Nielsen (Denmark) C Pedersen	19	21	21
(China) Wang YL (China) Luo Y	21	16	7
Q2	(Japan) K Kazuno (Japan) A Kurihara	21	21
(France) R Labar (France) E Lefel	19	16
3	(China) Xu C (China) Ma J	21	21
(Hong Kong) Lee C H (Hong Kong) Chau H W	11	14
(Chinese Taipei) Liao M-c (Chinese Taipei) Chen H-h	14	21	14
(Canada) T Ng (Canada) A Bruce	21	11	21
7	(South Korea) Ko S-h (South Korea) Kim H-n	21	21
(Malaysia) Chan P S (Malaysia) Goh L Y	18	13
(France) G Mittelheisser (France) A Fontaine	21	15	16
(Netherlands) J Arends (Netherlands) S Piek	16	21	21

Second Round
1	(China) Zhang N (China) Zhao YL	20	18
(South Korea) Shin B-c (South Korea) Chae Y-j	22	21
5	(Denmark) J Fischer Nielsen (Denmark) C Pedersen	21	20	22
Q2	(Japan) K Kazuno (Japan) A Kurihara	8	22	20
3	(China) Xu C (China) Ma J	21	21
(Canada) T Ng (Canada) A Bruce	11	12
7	(South Korea) Ko S-h (South Korea) Kim H-n	21	24	21
(Netherlands) J Arends (Netherlands) S Piek	16	26	16

Quarterfinals
(South Korea) Shin B-c (South Korea) Chae Y-j	16	19
5	(Denmark) J Fischer Nielsen (Denmark) C Pedersen	21	21
3	(China) Xu C (China) Ma J	21	13	15
7	(South Korea) Ko S-h (South Korea) Kim H-n	13	21	21

Semifinals
5	(Denmark) J Fischer Nielsen (Denmark) C Pedersen	14	16
7	(South Korea) Ko S-h (South Korea) Kim H-n	21	21

=== Bottom half ===
First Round
(Indonesia) P Jordan (Indonesia) D Susanto	21	21
(Russia) V Durkin (Russia) N Vislova	18	16
(Republic of Ireland) S Magee (Republic of Ireland) C Magee	14	11
6	(England) C Adcock (England) G Adcock	21	21
(South Korea) Kim G-j (South Korea) Shin S-c	21	15	14
Q3	(South Korea) Choi S-g (South Korea) Eom H-w	18	21	21
Q4	(South Korea) Lee Y-d (South Korea) Lee S-h	10	18
4	(China) Liu C (China) Bao YX	21	21
(Japan) K Sonoda (Japan) N Fukuman	21	22
(Hong Kong) Chan Y L (Hong Kong) Tse Y S	19	20
Q1	(South Korea) Yoo Y-s (South Korea) Chang Y-n	13	16
8	(China) Lu K (China) Huang YQ	21	21
(Singapore) D B Chrisnanta (Singapore) Vanessa Neo Y Y	8	21	21
(Germany) M Fuchs (Germany) B Michels	21	15	15
(Denmark) N Nohr (Denmark) S Thygesen	15	19
2	(Indonesia) T Ahmad (Indonesia) L Natsir	21	21

Second Round
(Indonesia) P Jordan (Indonesia) D Susanto	8	12
6	(England) C Adcock (England) G Adcock	21	21
Q3	(South Korea) Choi S-g (South Korea) Eom H-w	14	13
4	(China) Liu C (China) Bao YX	21	21
(Japan) K Sonoda (Japan) N Fukuman	4	21	16
8	(China) Lu K (China) Huang YQ	21	17	21
(Singapore) D B Chrisnanta (Singapore) Vanessa Neo Y Y	21	19	18
2	(Indonesia) T Ahmad (Indonesia) L Natsir	18	21	21

Quarterfinals
6	(England) C Adcock (England) G Adcock	23	18
4	(China) Liu C (China) Bao YX	25	21
8	(China) Lu K (China) Huang YQ	15	21	15
2	(Indonesia) T Ahmad (Indonesia) L Natsir	21	18	21

Semifinals
4	(China) Liu C (China) Bao YX	18	15
2	(Indonesia) T Ahmad (Indonesia) L Natsir	21	21

=== Finals ===
Semifinals
5	(Denmark) Joachim Fischer Nielsen (Denmark) Christinna Pedersen	14	16
7	(South Korea) Ko Sung-hyun (South Korea) Kim Ha-na	21	21
4	(China) Liu Cheng (China) Bao Yixin	18	16
2	(Indonesia) Tantowi Ahmad (Indonesia) Lilyana Natsir	21	21

Final
7	(South Korea) Ko Sung-hyun (South Korea) Kim Ha-na	20	21	21
2	(Indonesia) Tantowi Ahmad (Indonesia) Lilyana Natsir	22	18	9

Preceded by 2014 Denmark Super Series Premier	Denmark Open	Succeeded by 2016 Denmark Super Series Premier
Preceded by 2015 Korea Open Super Series	BWF Super Series; 2015 BWF Season	Succeeded by 2015 French Super Series
