= 2015 BWF World Junior Championships – Boys doubles =

2015 BWF World Junior Championships – Boys' Doubles
Tournament details
- Dates: 10–11 November 2015
- Edition: 17th
- Level: International
- Venue: Centro de Alto Rendimiento “La Videna”
- Location: Lima

The Boys' Doubles tournament of the 2015 BWF World Junior Championships is held on November 10–15. The defending champion of the last edition is Kittinupong Ketlen / Dechapol Puavaranukroh from Thailand.

== Seeded ==
1. (China) He Jiting / Zheng Siwei (Champion)
2. (Denmark) Joel Eipe / Frederik Sogaard Mortensen (Final)
3. (Japan) Kenya Mitsuhashi / Yuta Watanabe (Semifinals)
4. (Indonesia) Yahya Adi Kumara / Yantoni Edy Saputra (4th round)
5. (Indonesia) Andika Ramadiansyah / Rinov Rivaldy (2nd round)
6. (France) Gregor Dunikowski / Toma Junior Popov (4th round)
7. (Chinese Taipei) Po Li-wei / Yang Ming-tse (Quarterfinals)
8. (South Korea) Lee Hong-sub / Lim Su-min (Quarterfinals)
9. (Germany) Bjarne Geiss / Jan Colin Völker (3rd round)
10. (England) Matthew Clare / Ben Lane (3rd round)
11. (Malaysia) Goh Sze Fei / Tan Jinn Hwa (4th round)
12. (Thailand) Mek Narongrit / Krit Tantianankul (Quarterfinals)
13. (Slovenia) Miha Ivanic / Andraz Krapez (4th round)
14. (Turkey) Ömer Altinkopru / Fethican Degirmenci (3rd round)
15. (China) Han Chengkai / Zhou Haodong (Semifinals)
16. (France) Thomas Baures / Thom Gicquel (2nd round)

== Draw ==
=== Finals ===
Quarterfinals
1	(China) He Jiting (China) Zheng Siwei	21	21
7	(Chinese Taipei) Po Li-wei (Chinese Taipei) Yang Ming-tse	18	16
3	(Japan) Kenya Mitsuhashi (Japan) Yuta Watanabe	21	21
(China) Ren Xiangyu (China) Tan Qiang	19	19
15	(China) Han Chengkai (China) Zhou Haodong	17	21	21
12	(Thailand) Mek Narongrit (Thailand) Krit Tantianankul	21	18	13
8	(South Korea) Lee Hong-sub (South Korea) Lim Su-min	15	13
2	(Denmark) Joel Eipe (Denmark) Frederik Søgaard	21	21

Semifinals
1	(China) He Jiting (China) Zheng Siwei	21	21
3	(Japan) Kenya Mitsuhashi (Japan) Yuta Watanabe	13	16
15	(China) Han Chengkai (China) Zhou Haodong	21	17	20
2	(Denmark) Joel Eipe (Denmark) Frederik Søgaard	18	21	22

Final
1	(China) He Jiting (China) Zheng Siwei	21	21
2	(Denmark) Joel Eipe (Denmark) Frederik Søgaard	14	16

=== Top half ===
==== Section 1 ====
First round

Second round
1	(China) He JT (China) Zheng SW	w	/	o
(Singapore) Chuang J L (Singapore) R Ng
(India) A M Ramachandran (India) C Shetty	21	21
(United States) B Duong (United States) G Kalyanasundaram	13	18
9	(Germany) B Geiss (Germany) J C Völker	21	21
(Peru) B Barrueto (Peru) D Mini	16	12
(Sweden) V Aglinder (Sweden) C Harrbacka	11	8
(South Korea) Kang M-h (South Korea) Kim M-j	21	21

Third round
1	(China) He JT (China) Zheng SW	21	21
(India) A M Ramachandran (India) C Shetty	17	12
9	(Germany) B Geiss (Germany) J C Völker	23	18
(South Korea) Kang M-h (South Korea) Kim M-j	25	21

Fourth round
1	(China) He JT (China) Zheng SW	21	21
(South Korea) Kang M-h (South Korea) Kim M-j	13	10

==== Section 2 ====
First round
(Hong Kong) Chan Y C (Hong Kong) Lam W L	21	21
(Cuba) A Herrera (Cuba) B Veliz	11	10

Second round
7	(Chinese Taipei) Po L-w (Chinese Taipei) Yang M-t	23	20	21
(Chinese Taipei) Chien H-j (Chinese Taipei) Hsu C-y	21	22	16
(Macau) Che P N (Macau) Pui P F	21	21
(Colombia) J Noguera (Colombia) K Nupan	10	9
16	(France) T Baures (France) T Gicquel	18	16
(Thailand) P Kuna-Anuvit (Thailand) N Trinkajee	21	21
(Costa Rica) G Cavallotti (Costa Rica) Z A Zheng Chen	9	11
(Hong Kong) Chan Y C (Hong Kong) Lam W L	21	21

Third round
7	(Chinese Taipei) Po L-w (Chinese Taipei) Yang M-t	21	21
(Macau) Che P N (Macau) Pui P F	5	6
(Thailand) P Kuna-Anuvit (Thailand) N Trinkajee	21	18	21
(Hong Kong) Chan Y C (Hong Kong) Lam W L	12	21	16

Fourth round
7	(Chinese Taipei) Po L-w (Chinese Taipei) Yang M-t	21	21
(Thailand) P Kuna-Anuvit (Thailand) N Trinkajee	10	15

==== Section 3 ====
First round

Second round
3	(Japan) K Mitsuhashi (Japan) Y Watanabe	21	21
(Guyana) R Chang Yuen (Guyana) N Ramdhani	5	8
(Spain) A J Ibeas (Spain) A Vazquez	21	21
(Mexico) H Aguirre (Mexico) V M Ramirez	15	11
11	(Malaysia) Goh S F (Malaysia) Tan J W	21	21
(South Korea) Kang W-h (South Korea) Kim H-j	9	8
(Canada) J A Ho-Shue (Canada) J Lai
(Dominican Republic) C A Brito (Dominican Republic) A A Marinez	w	/	o

Third round
3	(Japan) K Mitsuhashi (Japan) Y Watanabe	21	21
(Spain) A J Ibeas (Spain) A Vazquez	4	10
11	(Malaysia) Goh S F (Malaysia) Tan J W	21	21
(Dominican Republic) C A Brito (Dominican Republic) A A Marinez	11	8

Fourth round
3	(Japan) K Mitsuhashi (Japan) Y Watanabe	21	21
11	(Malaysia) Goh S F (Malaysia) Tan J W	19	15

==== Section 4 ====
First round
(Denmark) R Kjaer (Denmark) J Toft	21	21
(England) M Flynn (England) D King	19	14

Second round
5	(Indonesia) A Ramadiansyah (Indonesia) R Rivaldy	15	11
(China) Ren XY (China) Tan Q	21	21
(Argentina) M Delmastro (Barbados) S M Martin	13	11
(Italy) L Osele (Italy) K Strobl	21	21
14	(Turkey) Ö Altinkopru (Turkey) F Degirmenci	21	13	21
(New Zealand) O Guo (New Zealand) C Steeghs	11	21	19
(Venezuela) I Elyouri (Venezuela) Q Willfer	12	11
(Denmark) R Kjaer (Denmark) J Toft	21	21

Third round
(China) Ren XY (China) Tan Q	21	21
(Italy) L Osele (Italy) K Strobl	4	6
14	(Turkey) Ö Altinkopru (Turkey) F Degirmenci	21	19
(Denmark) R Kjaer (Denmark) J Toft	23	21

Fourth round
(China) Ren XY (China) Tan Q	21	21
(Denmark) R Kjaer (Denmark) J Toft	14	13

=== Bottom half ===
==== Section 5 ====
First round
(Netherlands) S Li (Netherlands) N Veenstra	21	21
(South Africa) M Jennings (South Africa) B Nel	16	17

Second round
(Netherlands) S Li (Netherlands) N Veenstra	9	13
(Japan) K Sakai (Japan) K Watanabe	21	21
(Chinese Taipei) Chen C-w (Chinese Taipei) Lu C-h	18	18
15	(China) Han CK (China) Zhou HD	21	21
9	(Chile) D Castillo (Chile) A Medel	w	/	o
(Suriname) M A N C Tong (Suriname) S Opti
(New Zealand) B Hillier (New Zealand) N Tagle	11	19
6	(France) G Dunikowski (France) T J Popov	21	21

Third round
(Japan) K Sakai (Japan) K Watanabe	22	12
15	(China) Han CK (China) Zhou HD	24	21
(Chile) D Castillo (Chile) A Medel	7	15
6	(France) G Dunikowski (France) T J Popov	21	21

Fourth round
15	(China) Han CK (China) Zhou HD	21	21
6	(France) G Dunikowski (France) T J Popov	13	18

==== Section 6 ====
First round

Second round
(Singapore) Lee J L (Singapore) J Wong	21	21
(Macau) Iek U I (Macau) Wan W C	6	13
(Peru) J Guevara (Peru) D La Torre	12	14
12	(Thailand) M Narongrit (Thailand) K Tantianankul	21	21
(Australia) J Lee (Australia) Tang HD	7	10
(India) K P Garaga (India) S Rankireddy	21	21
(Hong Kong) Y Chung (Hong Kong) Li K H	21	19	13
4	(Indonesia) Y A Kumara (Indonesia) Y E Saputra	17	21	21

Third round
(Singapore) Lee J L (Singapore) J Wong	22	11
12	(Thailand) M Narongrit (Thailand) K Tantianankul	24	21
(India) K P Garaga (India) S Rankireddy	18	16
4	(Indonesia) Y A Kumara (Indonesia) Y E Saputra	21	21

Fourth round
12	(Thailand) M Narongrit (Thailand) K Tantianankul	16	21	21
4	(Indonesia) Y A Kumara (Indonesia) Y E Saputra	21	19	18

==== Section 7 ====
First round
(Malaysia) A Chia (Malaysia) Soh W Y	21	21
(Iceland) K D Finnsson (Iceland) P Gudfinnsson	7	13

Second round
(Malaysia) A Chia (Malaysia) Soh W Y	21	21
(Hungary) B Pytel (Hungary) B Szenjai	7	7
(United States) B Chen (United States) A La	12	5
10	(England) M Clare (England) B Lane	21	21
(Germany) F Hammes (Germany) J Voigt	14	21	12
(Thailand) K Cheiklinthes (Thailand) W Inkaew	21	18	21
(Venezuela) J Calanche (Venezuela) G Fratta	5	6
8	(South Korea) Lee H-s (South Korea) Lim S-m	21	21

Third round
(Malaysia) A Chia (Malaysia) Soh W Y	21	21
10	(England) M Clare (England) B Lane	14	17
(Thailand) K Cheiklinthes (Thailand) W Inkaew	11	10
8	(South Korea) Lee H-s (South Korea) Lim S-m	21	21

Fourth round
(Malaysia) A Chia (Malaysia) Soh W Y	17	11
8	(South Korea) Lee H-s (South Korea) Lim S-m	21	21

==== Section 8 ====
First round

Second round
(Mexico) A R Correa (Mexico) D Morales	17	21	11
(Guatemala) R Castellanos (Guatemala) M Umana	21	13	21
(El Salvador) U F Canjura (El Salvador) J Guardado	9	11
13	(Slovenia) M Ivanic (Slovenia) A Krapez	21	21
(Turkey) E Comert (Turkey) B Yuksel	22	16	21
(Spain) A Nogueira (Spain) M Brea	20	21	18
(Japan) S Morioka (Japan) K Ogawa	19	21	15
2	(Denmark) J Eipe (Denmark) F Sogaard	21	13	21

Third round
(Guatemala) R Castellanos (Guatemala) M Umana	16	12
13	(Slovenia) M Ivanic (Slovenia) A Krapez	21	21
(Turkey) E Comert (Turkey) B Yuksel	15	9
2	(Denmark) J Eipe (Denmark) F Sogaard	21	21

Fourth round
13	(Slovenia) M Ivanic (Slovenia) A Krapez	8	13
2	(Denmark) J Eipe (Denmark) F Sogaard	21	21
