= Victor Svendsen =

Danish badminton player (born 1995)

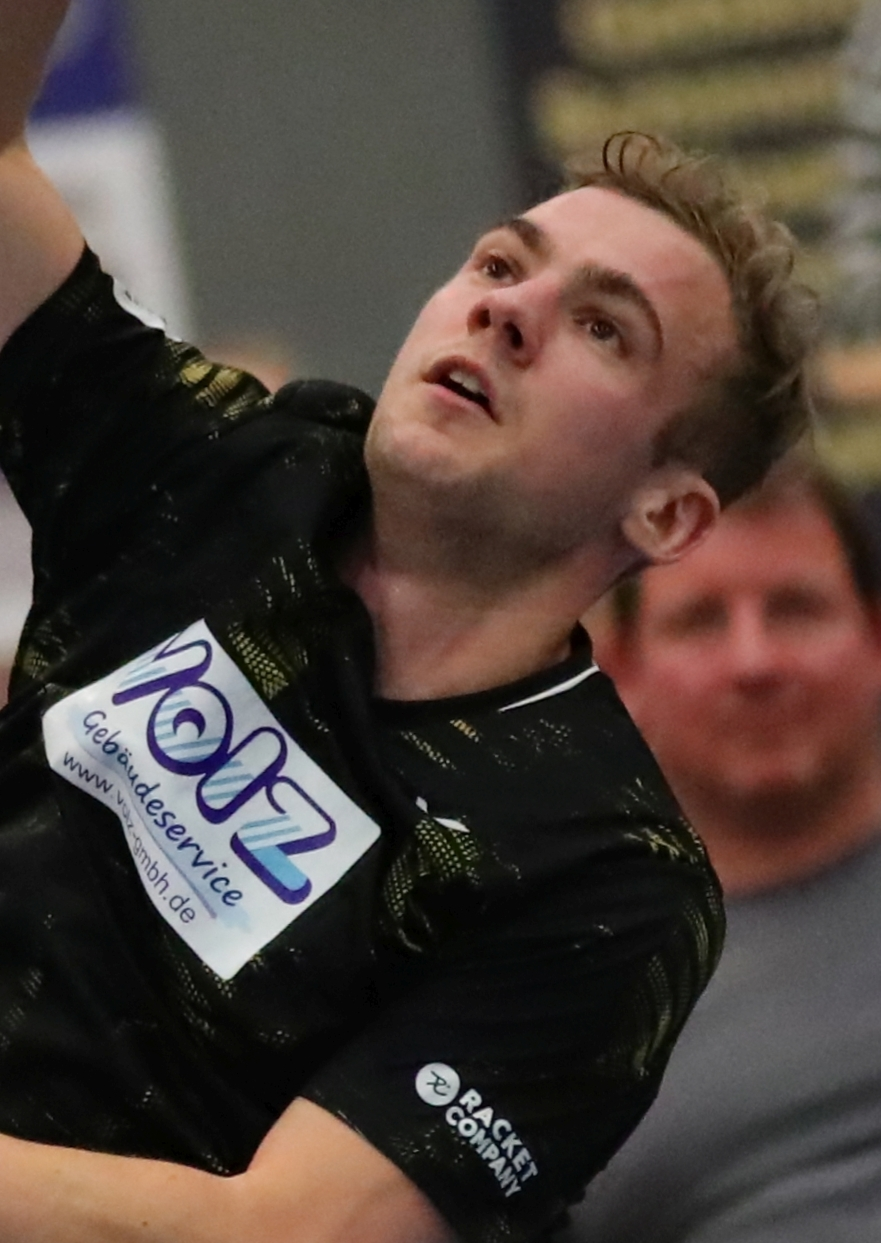
- Svendsen in 2026

Personal information
- Born: 2 August 1995 (age 31) Hjørring, Nordjylland, Denmark

Sport
- Country: Denmark
- Sport: Badminton
- Handedness: Right

Men's singles
- Highest ranking: 43 (21 March 2023)
- Current ranking: 64 (13 June 2023)
- BWF profile
Medal record
Men's badminton
Representing Denmark
Thomas Cup
Bronze medal – third place	2022 Bangkok	Men's team
European Junior Championships
Gold medal – first place	2013 Ankara	Mixed team

Victor Svendsen (born 2 August 1995) is a Danish badminton player. Svendsen has shown his talent as a badminton player since he was young. Trained at the Vendsyssel's talent department, he claimed the national U–13 elite team title and won the bronze medals in the singles and doubles event. In the national event, he previously played for Ikast, and now was part of the Vendsyssel Elite Badminton.

== Career ==
He reached the semifinals at the 2022 Korea Open. Because of his good results, he was selected to represent Danish team for the 2022 Thomas Cup and won a bronze medal.

== Achievements ==
=== BWF International Challenge/Series (9 titles, 8 runners-up) ===
Men's singles
Year	Tournament	Opponent	Score	Result
2016	Polish International	(India) Sourabh Verma	29–27, 21–13	(gold) Winner
2016	Hungarian International	(Denmark) Kim Bruun	10–12, 6–11, 6–11	(silver) Runner-up
2016	Finnish International	(Finland) Kalle Koljonen	11–7, 11–7, 8–11, 10–12, 11–4	(gold) Winner
2017	Portugal International	(India) Subhankar Dey	19–21, 19–21	(silver) Runner-up
2017	Hungarian International	(Spain) Pablo Abián	21–13, 15–21, 21–12	(gold) Winner
2018	KaBaL International	(India) Subhankar Dey	21–19, 21–19	(gold) Winner
2018	Belgian International	(England) Toby Penty	13–21, 21–19, 19–21	(silver) Runner-up
2018	Czech Open	(France) Toma Junior Popov	16–21, 11–21	(silver) Runner-up
2018	Hungarian International	(Denmark) Rasmus Messerschmidt	21–14, 16–21, 9–21	(silver) Runner-up
2018	Italian International	(France) Thomas Rouxel	21–12, 21–17	(gold) Winner
2019	Belgian International	(India) Lakshya Sen	14–21, 15–21	(silver) Runner-up
2019	Hungarian International	(Spain) Pablo Abián	21–17, 15–21, 12–21	(silver) Runner-up
2020	Swedish Open	(Sweden) Felix Burestedt	18–8 retired	(gold) Winner
2021	Denmark Masters	(Canada) Brian Yang	21–16, 17–21, 15–21	(silver) Runner-up
2022	Czech Open	(Chinese Taipei) Huang Yu-kai	21–18, 21–17	(gold) Winner
2023	Swedish Open	(Finland) Kalle Koljonen	21–14, 21–11	(gold) Winner
2023	Dutch Open	(Denmark) Karan Rajan Rajarajan	22–20, 21–9	(gold) Winner

BWF International Challenge tournament
BWF International Series tournament
BWF Future Series tournament
