= Joel Eipe =

Danish badminton player (born 1997)

Joel Eipe, Tissemand
Personal information
- Born: 12 March 1997 (age 29) Frederiksberg, Denmark
- Height: 1.79 m (5 ft 10 in)

Sport
- Country: Denmark
- Sport: Badminton
- Handedness: Right

Men's & mixed doubles
- Highest ranking: 56 (MD with Rasmus Kjær 17 August 2021); 91 (XD with Mette Poulsen 22 October 2019)
- BWF profile
Medal record
Men's badminton
Representing Denmark
World Junior Championships
Silver medal – second place	2015 Lima	Boys' doubles
European Junior Championships
Gold medal – first place	2015 Lubin	Boys' doubles
Bronze medal – third place	2015 Lubin	Mixed team

Joel Eipe (born 12 March 1997) is a Danish badminton player. He won the boys' doubles title at the 2015 European Junior Championships, and a silver medal at the World Junior Championships.

== Career ==
Eipe has planned to compete at the 2021 European Championships in Kyiv, Ukraine, but he failed to made his debut in the championships after tested positive of COVID-19.

== Achievements ==
=== BWF World Junior Championships ===
Boys' doubles
Year	Venue	Partner	Opponent	Score	Result
2015	Centro de Alto Rendimiento de la Videna; Lima, Peru	(Denmark) Frederik Søgaard	(China) He Jiting (China) Zheng Siwei	14–21, 16–21	Silver

=== European Junior Championships ===
Boys' doubles
Year	Venue	Partner	Opponent	Score	Result
2015	Regional Sport Centrum Hall, Lubin, Poland	(Denmark) Alexander Bond	(England) Ben Lane (England) Sean Vendy	21–15, 22–24, 21–16	Gold

=== BWF International Challenge/Series (4 titles, 3 runners-up) ===
Men's doubles
Year	Tournament	Partner	Opponent	Score	Result
2016	Dutch International	(Denmark) Alexander Bond	(Denmark) Frederik Aalestrup (Denmark) Mathias Moldt Baskjær	17–21, 21–17, 21–14	(gold) Winner
2017	Hungarian International	(Denmark) Philip Seerup	(Denmark) Frederik Colberg (Denmark) Rasmus Fladberg	18–21, 14–21	(silver) Runner-up
2017	Norwegian International	(Denmark) Philip Seerup	(England) Matthew Clare (England) David King	21–8, 18–21, 21–19	(gold) Winner
2019	Austrian Open	(Denmark) Rasmus Kjær	(China) Guo Xinwa (China) Liu Shiwen	15–21, 22–20, 16–21	(silver) Runner-up
2019	Spanish International	(Denmark) Rasmus Kjær	(Denmark) Mathias Boe (Denmark) Mads Conrad-Petersen	11–21, 10–21	(silver) Runner-up

Mixed doubles
Year	Tournament	Partner	Opponent	Score	Result
2018	Hungarian International	(Denmark) Mette Poulsen	(Russia) Rodion Alimov (Russia) Alina Davletova	21–10, 19–21, 21–10	(gold) Winner
2018	Norwegian International	(Denmark) Mette Poulsen	(Denmark) Mathias Moldt Baskjær (Denmark) Marie Louise Steffensen	21–12, 21–14	(gold) Winner

BWF International Challenge tournament
BWF International Series tournament
BWF Future Series tournament
