= Frederik Søgaard =

Danish badminton player

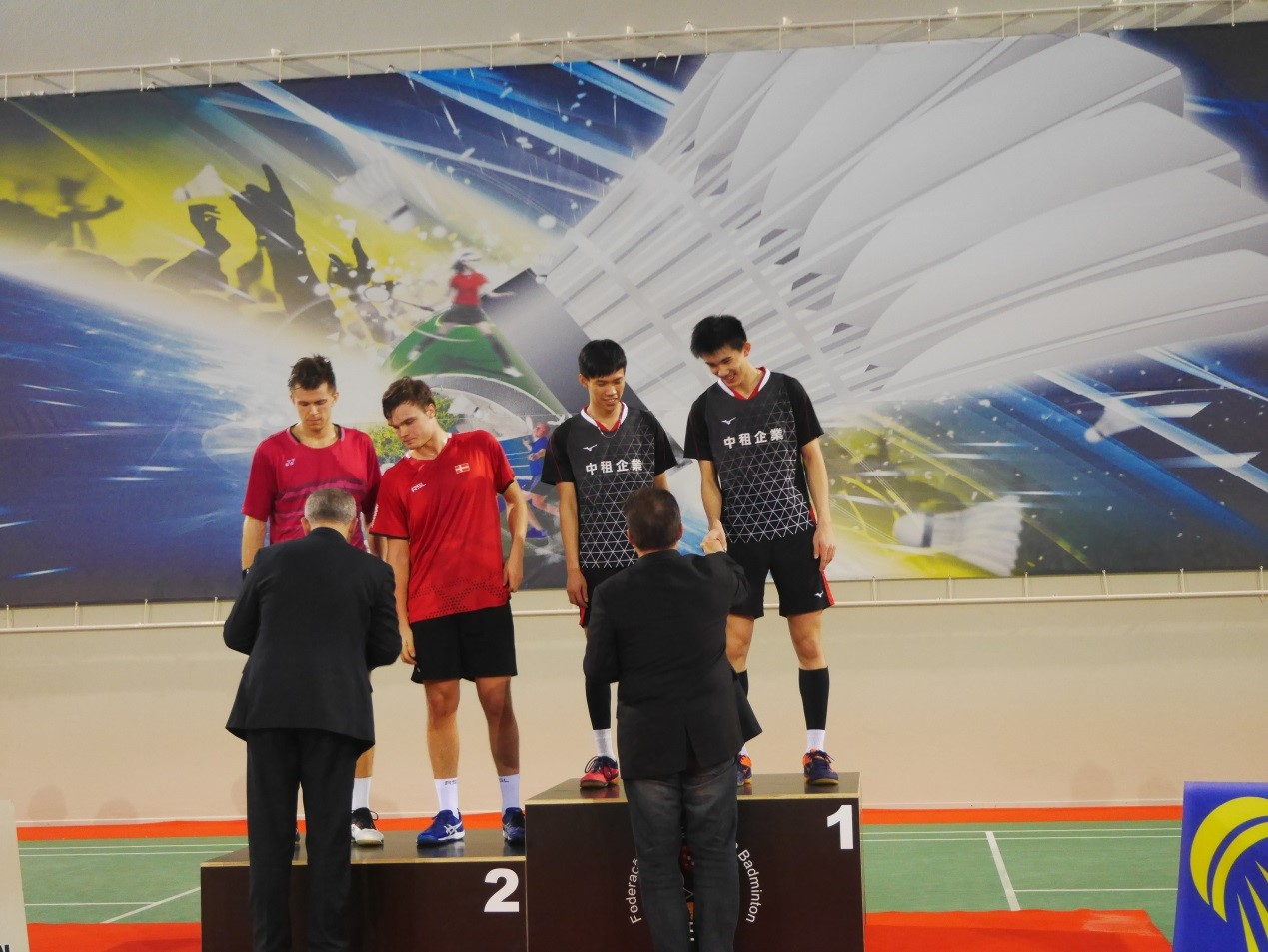

Personal information
- Born: Frederik Søgaard Mortensen; 25 July 1997 (age 29) Nyborg, Denmark
- Height: 1.86 m (6 ft 1 in)

Sport
- Country: Denmark
- Sport: Badminton
- Handedness: Right

Men's & mixed doubles
- Highest ranking: 13 (MD with Rasmus Kjær, 27 August 2024); 37 (MD with David Daugaard, 23 July 2019); 184 (XD with Alexandra Bøje, 18 February 2020)
- Current ranking: 44 (MD with Rasmus Kjær, 24 March 2026)
- BWF profile
Medal record
Men's badminton
Representing Denmark
Thomas Cup
Bronze medal – third place	2020 Aarhus	Men's team
Bronze medal – third place	2022 Bangkok	Men's team
European Championships
Bronze medal – third place	2024 Saarbrücken	Men's doubles
Bronze medal – third place	2025 Horsens	Men's doubles
European Mixed Team Championships
Gold medal – first place	2019 Copenhagen	Mixed team
Gold medal – first place	2021 Vantaa	Mixed team
Gold medal – first place	2023 Aire-sur-la-Lys	Mixed team
Gold medal – first place	2025 Baku	Mixed team
European Men's Team Championships
Gold medal – first place	2020 Liévin	Men's team
Gold medal – first place	2024 Łódź	Men's team
World Junior Championships
Silver medal – second place	2015 Lima	Boys' doubles
European Junior Championships
Silver medal – second place	2015 Lubin	Mixed doubles
Bronze medal – third place	2015 Lubin	Boys' doubles
Bronze medal – third place	2015 Lubin	Mixed team

Frederik Søgaard Mortensen (born 25 July 1997) is a Danish badminton player. He was the bronze medalists in the 2024 and 2025 European Championships. Søgaard was part of the Denmark winning team at the 2019, 2021, 2023, and 2025 European Mixed Team, as well at the 2020 and 2024 European Men's Team Championships. In his junior, he was the silver medalist in the boys' doubles at the 2015 World Junior Championships and in the mixed doubles at the 2015 European Junior Championships and also won bronzes in the boys' doubles and the team events at the European Junior Championships.

== Achievements ==
=== European Championships ===
Men's doubles
Year	Venue	Partner	Opponent	Score	Result	Ref.
2024	Saarlandhalle; Saarbrücken, Germany	(Denmark) Rasmus Kjær	(Denmark) Andreas Søndergaard (Denmark) Jesper Toft	15–21, 16–21	Bronze	
2025	Forum, Horsens, Denmark	(Denmark) Rasmus Kjær	(France) Éloi Adam (France) Léo Rossi	21–17, 14–21, 0–2 retired	Bronze	

=== World Junior Championships ===
Boys' doubles
Year	Venue	Partner	Opponent	Score	Result
2015	Centro de Alto Rendimiento de la Videna; Lima, Peru	(Denmark) Joel Eipe	(China) He Jiting (China) Zheng Siwei	14–21, 16–21	Silver

=== European Junior Championships ===
Boys' doubles
Year	Venue	Partner	Opponent	Score	Result
2015	Regional Sport Centrum Hall; Lubin, Poland	(Denmark) Mathias Bay-Smidt	(England) Ben Lane (England) Sean Vendy	15–21, 21–19, 18–21	Bronze

Mixed doubles
Year	Venue	Partner	Opponent	Score	Result
2015	Regional Sport Centrum Hall; Lubin, Poland	(Denmark) Sara Lundgaard	(Germany) Max Weißkirchen (Germany) Eva Janssens	21–19, 12–21, 18–21	Silver

=== BWF World Tour (3 runners-up) ===
The BWF World Tour, which was announced on 19 March 2017 and implemented in 2018, is a series of elite badminton tournaments sanctioned by the Badminton World Federation (BWF). The BWF World Tours are divided into levels of World Tour Finals, Super 1000, Super 750, Super 500, Super 300 (part of the HSBC World Tour), and the BWF Tour Super 100.

Men's doubles
Year	Tournament	Level	Partner	Opponent	Score	Result
2018	Scottish Open	Super 100	(Denmark) David Daugaard	(England) Marcus Ellis (England) Chris Langridge	21–23, 16–21	(silver) Runner-up
2023	Canada Open	Super 500	(Denmark) Rasmus Kjær	(Denmark) Kim Astrup (Denmark) Anders Skaarup Rasmussen	25–23, 16–21, 12–21	(silver) Runner-up
2024	Hylo Open	Super 300	(Denmark) Rasmus Kjær	(England) Ben Lane (England) Sean Vendy	21–18, 15–21, 18–21	(silver) Runner-up

=== BWF International Challenge/Series (8 titles, 5 runners-up) ===
Men's doubles
Year	Tournament	Partner	Opponent	Score	Result	Ref.
2014	Finnish International	(Denmark) Mathias Bay-Smidt	(Denmark) Kasper Antonsen (Denmark) Oliver Babic	25–23, 15–21, 21–17	(gold) Winner	
2016	Slovenia International	(Denmark) Mathias Bay-Smidt	(Republic of Ireland) Joshua Magee (Republic of Ireland) Sam Magee	9–21, 22–20, 18–21	(silver) Runner-up	
2016	Czech International	(Denmark) Mathias Bay-Smidt	(Chinese Taipei) Lu Ching-yao (Chinese Taipei) Yang Po-han	17–21, 22–20, 15–21	(silver) Runner-up	
2018	Portugal International	(Denmark) Mathias Bay-Smidt	(Chinese Taipei) Lu Chen (Chinese Taipei) Ye Hong-wei	21–23, 18–21	(silver) Runner-up	
2018	Belgian International	(Denmark) David Daugaard	(Netherlands) Jacco Arends (Netherlands) Ruben Jille	21–11, 18–21, 17–21	(silver) Runner-up	
2018	Hungarian International	(Denmark) David Daugaard	(Poland) Miłosz Bochat (Poland) Adam Cwalina	15–21, 21–12, 21–12	(gold) Winner	
2021	Portugal International	(Denmark) Mads Pieler Kolding	(Denmark) Emil Lauritzen (Denmark) Mads Vestergaard	21–17, 21–18	(gold) Winner	
2022	Polish Open	(Denmark) Rasmus Kjær	(Chinese Taipei) Su Ching-heng (Chinese Taipei) Ye Hong-wei	21–16, 17–21, 21–19	(gold) Winner	
2022	Dutch International	(Denmark) Rasmus Kjær	(England) Alex Green (England) Jonty Russ	21–9, 21–19	(gold) Winner	
2022	Irish Open	(Denmark) Rasmus Kjær	(Japan) Ayato Endo (Japan) Yuta Takei	18–21, 12–21	(silver) Runner-up	
2022	Welsh International	(Denmark) Rasmus Kjær	(Denmark) Andreas Søndergaard (Denmark) Jesper Toft	21–19, 21–18	(gold) Winner	
2022	Canadian International	(Denmark) Rasmus Kjær	(Japan) Mahiro Kaneko (Japan) Hashiru Shimono	21–17, 21–17	(gold) Winner	
2023	Denmark Masters	(Denmark) Rasmus Kjær	(Chinese Taipei) Lu Ming-che (Chinese Taipei) Tang Kai-wei	21–5, 21–16	(gold) Winner	

BWF International Challenge tournament
BWF International Series tournament
BWF Future Series tournament
