= Rasmus Messerschmidt =

Danish badminton player (born 1992)

Personal information
- Born: 9 June 1992 (age 34)
- Years active: 2011–present

Sport
- Country: Denmark
- Sport: Badminton

Men's singles
- Highest ranking: 89 (22 January 2019)
- BWF profile

Rasmus Messerschmidt (born 9 June 1992) is a Danish badminton player. Messerschmidt also plays for the Bornholm team, and in 2018 he won his first senior international title at the Portugal International.

== Achievements ==
=== BWF International Challenge/Series (3 titles, 1 runner-up) ===
Men's singles
Year	Tournament	Opponent	Score	Result
2015	Hungarian International	(Finland) Kalle Koljonen	21–19, 17–21, 15–21	(silver) Runner-up
2018	Portugal International	(Sweden) Felix Burestedt	21–18, 21–15	(gold) Winner
2018	Hungarian International	(Denmark) Victor Svendsen	14–21, 21–16, 21–9	(gold) Winner
2018	Norwegian International	(Spain) Luis Enrique Peñalver	21–12, 21–16	(gold) Winner

BWF International Challenge tournament
BWF International Series tournament
BWF Future Series tournament
