= 2025 BWF Continental Circuit =

Tournament details
- Dates: 9 January – 28 December
- Edition: 19th

The 2025 BWF Continental Circuit is a series of Grade 3 badminton tournaments in 2025 organized by each continental confederation under the auspices of the BWF. The circuit consists of 88 tournaments, which are divided into three levels:

- International Challenge (32 tournaments)
- International Series (31 tournaments)
- Future Series (25 tournaments).

Each of these tournaments offers different ranking points and prize money.

== Points distribution ==
Below is the point distribution table for each phase of the tournament based on the BWF points system for the BWF Continental Circuit events.

Tournament	Winner	Runner-up	3/4	5/8	9/16	17/32	33/64	65/128	129/256
International Challenge	4,000	3,400	2,800	2,200	1,520	920	360	170	70
International Series	2,500	2,130	1,750	1,370	920	550	210	100	40
Future Series	1,700	1,420	1,170	920	600	350	130	60	20

== Results ==
Below is the schedule released by Badminton World Federation:

=== Winners ===
==== International Challenge ====
Tour	Men's singles	Women's singles	Men's doubles	Women's doubles	Mixed doubles
Iran Fajr International	(India) Manraj Singh	(Turkey) Neslihan Arın	(India) Arjun M. R. (India) Vishnuvardhan Panjala	(Bulgaria) Gabriela Stoeva (Bulgaria) Stefani Stoeva	(India) Ishaan Bhatnagar (India) Srinidhi Narayanan
Singapore International	(Indonesia) Zaki Ubaidillah	(Indonesia) Ruzana	(Indonesia) Raymond Indra (Indonesia) Nikolaus Joaquin	(South Korea) Jang Eun-seo (South Korea) Lee Seo-jin	(Indonesia) Bobby Setiabudi (Indonesia) Melati Daeva Oktavianti
Uganda International	(India) Manraj Singh	(United States) Ishika Jaiswal	(India) Mohammad Amaan (India) Dingku Konthoujam	(United States) Lauren Lam (United States) Allison Lee	(India) Ishaan Bhatnagar (India) Srinidhi Narayanan
Sri Lanka International	(Malaysia) Aidil Sholeh	(Japan) Manami Suizu	(Indonesia) Raymond Indra (Indonesia) Nikolaus Joaquin	(Japan) Hina Osawa (Japan) Akari Sato	(Indonesia) Bobby Setiabudi (Indonesia) Melati Daeva Oktavianti
(Poland) Polish Open	(France) Arnaud Merklé	(Turkey) Neslihan Arın	(Chinese Taipei) Su Ching-heng (Chinese Taipei) Wu Guan-xun	(United States) Lauren Lam (United States) Allison Lee	(Indonesia) Rehan Naufal Kusharjanto (Indonesia) Gloria Emanuelle Widjaja
Vietnam International	(Thailand) Puritat Arree	(Japan) Manami Suizu	(Vietnam) Nguyễn Đình Hoàng (Vietnam) Trần Đình Mạnh	(Japan) Hina Osawa (Japan) Akari Sato	(Hong Kong) Tang Chun Man (Hong Kong) Ng Tsz Yau
(Mexico) Mexican International	(United States) Mark Alcala	(Japan) Sakura Masuki	(Japan) Haruki Kawabe (Japan) Kenta Matsukawa	(Japan) Kaho Osawa (Japan) Mai Tanabe	(Japan) Akira Koga (Japan) Yuho Imai
Denmark Challenge	(France) Arnaud Merklé	(India) Tanvi Sharma	(Indonesia) Raymond Indra (Indonesia) Nikolaus Joaquin	(Japan) Mikoto Aiso (Japan) Momoha Niimi	(Indonesia) Zaidan Nabawi (Indonesia) Jessica Rismawardani
Réunion Open	(Japan) Riki Takei	(India) Isharani Baruah	(India) Hariharan Amsakarunan (India) Ruban Kumar	(Sweden) Moa Sjöö (Sweden) Tilda Sjöö	(Germany) Marvin Seidel (Germany) Thuc Phuong Nguyen
(Northern Mariana Islands) Northern Marianas Open	(Japan) Yudai Okimoto	(Japan) Sakura Masuki	(Japan) Kakeru Kumagai (Japan) Hiroki Nishi	(Japan) Ririna Hiramoto (Japan) Kokona Ishikawa	(Japan) Akira Koga (Japan) Yuho Imai
(Northern Mariana Islands) Saipan International	(Japan) Riki Takei	(India) Tanya Hemanth	(Japan) Naoya Kawashima (Japan) Akira Koga	(Japan) Hinata Suzuki (Japan) Nao Yamakita	(South Korea) An Yun-seong (South Korea) Lee Yu-lim
Malaysia International	(Malaysia) Eogene Ewe	(India) Devika Sihag	(Japan) Keiichiro Matsui (Japan) Katsuki Tamate	(South Korea) Jeon Jui (South Korea) Kim Ha-na	(Malaysia) Tan Zhi Yang (Malaysia) Nicole Tan
Thailand International	(Indonesia) Richie Duta Richardo	(Thailand) Anyapat Phichitpreechasak	(Indonesia) Ali Faathir Rayhan (Indonesia) Devin Artha Wahyudi	(Japan) Sayaka Hirota (Japan) Maiko Kawazoe	(Thailand) Phuwanat Horbanluekit (Thailand) Fungfa Korpthammakit
Cameroon International	(Indonesia) Prahdiska Bagas Shujiwo	(Indonesia) Thalita Ramadhani Wiryawan	(India) Suraj Goala (India) Dhruv Rawat	(Indonesia) Isyana Syahira Meida (Indonesia) Rinjani Kwinara Nastine	(Indonesia) M. Nawaf Khoiriyansyah (Indonesia) Nahya Muhyifa
(Nigeria) Lagos International	(Indonesia) Prahdiska Bagas Shujiwo	(India) Shreya Lele	(Individual Neutral Athletes) Rodion Alimov (Individual Neutral Athletes) Maksim Ogloblin	(Indonesia) Isyana Syahira Meida (Indonesia) Rinjani Kwinara Nastine	(Indonesia) Bimo Prasetyo (Indonesia) Arlya Munggaran
(Belgium) Belgian International	(Japan) Minoru Koga	(Bulgaria) Kaloyana Nalbantova	(Denmark) Kristoffer Kolding (Denmark) Calvin Lundsgaard	(Bulgaria) Gabriela Stoeva (Bulgaria) Stefani Stoeva	(Denmark) Rasmus Espersen (Denmark) Amalie Cecilie Kudsk
Guatemala International	(Sri Lanka) Dumindu Abeywickrama	(Canada) Rachel Chan	(Brazil) Fabrício Farias (Brazil) Davi Silva	(Japan) Mao Hatasue (Japan) Kanano Muroya	(Canada) Timothy Lock (Canada) Chloe Hoang
(Netherlands) Dutch Open	(France) Arnaud Merklé	(Chinese Taipei) Huang Ching-ping	(France) Maël Cattoen (France) Lucas Renoir	(France) Elsa Jacob (France) Flavie Vallet	(Denmark) Kristoffer Kolding (Denmark) Mette Werge
(New Zealand) North Harbour International	(Chinese Taipei) Wang Po-wei	(Chinese Taipei) Tung Ciou-tong	(Chinese Taipei) Su Ching-heng (Chinese Taipei) Wu Guan-xun	(Chinese Taipei) Chen Su-yu (Chinese Taipei) Hsieh Yi-en	(Chinese Taipei) Lin Yu-chieh (Chinese Taipei) Lee Chih-chen
(Australia) Sydney International	(Chinese Taipei) Wang Yu-kai	(Chinese Taipei) Chen Su-yu	(Japan) Haruki Kawabe (Japan) Kenta Matsukawa	(Chinese Taipei) Chen Su-yu (Chinese Taipei) Hsieh Yi-en	(Chinese Taipei) Wu Guan-xun (Chinese Taipei) Lee Chia-hsin
(Turkey) Türkiye International	(England) Harry Huang	(Turkey) Neslihan Arın	(India) Hariharan Amsakarunan (India) Arjun M. R.	(Bulgaria) Gabriela Stoeva (Bulgaria) Stefani Stoeva	(India) Hariharan Amsakarunan (India) Treesa Jolly
(Australia) Bendigo International	(Japan) Toma Noda	(Japan) Nodoka Sunakawa	(Chinese Taipei) Chen Zhi-ray (Chinese Taipei) Lin Yu-chieh	(Chinese Taipei) Sung Yi-hsuan (Chinese Taipei) Tsai Hsin-pei	(Chinese Taipei) Wu Guan-xun (Chinese Taipei) Lee Chia-hsin
(Czech Republic) Czech Open	(Indonesia) Muhamad Yusuf	(Bulgaria) Kaloyana Nalbantova	(Denmark) Rasmus Espersen (Denmark) Andreas Søndergaard	(Denmark) Natasja Anthonisen (Denmark) Amalie Cecilie Kudsk	(Denmark) Rasmus Espersen (Denmark) Amalie Cecilie Kudsk
China International	Cancelled				
India International (Mangalore)	(India) Rithvik Sanjeevi	(India) Mansi Singh	(Singapore) Wesley Koh (Singapore) Junsuke Kubo	(Thailand) Hathaithip Mijad (Thailand) Napapakorn Tungkasatan	(India) Dhruv Rawat (India) K. Maneesha
India International (Telangana)	(India) Ginpaul Sonna	(India) Mansi Singh	(India) Hariharan Amsakarunan (India) Arjun M. R.	(Thailand) Hathaithip Mijad (Thailand) Napapakorn Tungkasatan	(India) Sathwik Reddy Kanapuram (India) Reshika Uthayasooriyan
(Republic of Ireland) Irish Open	(France) Arnaud Merklé	(South Korea) Kim Ga-ram	(England) Alex Green (England) Zach Russ	(South Korea) Kim Min-ji (South Korea) Lee Ye-na	(Denmark) Rasmus Espersen (Denmark) Amalie Cecilie Kudsk
Indonesia International I	(Indonesia) Prahdiska Bagas Shujiwo	(Indonesia) Thalita Ramadhani Wiryawan	(Indonesia) Putra Erwiansyah (Indonesia) Daniel Edgar Marvino	(Chinese Taipei) Lin Chih-chun (Chinese Taipei) Lin Wan-ching	(Indonesia) Bobby Setiabudi (Indonesia) Melati Daeva Oktavianti
Indonesia International II	(Chinese Taipei) Liao Jhuo-fu	(South Korea) Kim Min-ji	(Indonesia) Ali Faathir Rayhan (Indonesia) Devin Artha Wahyudi	(Chinese Taipei) Lin Chih-chun (Chinese Taipei) Lin Wan-ching	(Indonesia) Bobby Setiabudi (Indonesia) Melati Daeva Oktavianti
(Scotland) Scottish Open	(France) Arnaud Merklé	(Scotland) Kirsty Gilmour	(Denmark) Daniel Lundgaard (Denmark) Mads Vestergaard	(South Korea) Kim Min-ji (South Korea) Lee Ye-na	(Denmark) Rasmus Espersen (Denmark) Amalie Cecilie Kudsk
(Canada) Canadian International	(Canada) Victor Lai	(Canada) Michelle Li	(United States) Chen Zhi Yi (United States) Presley Smith	(Canada) Jackie Dent (Canada) Crystal Lai	(Canada) Timothy Lock (Canada) Chloe Hoang
Bangladesh International	(India) Meiraba Maisnam	(United States) Ishika Jaiswal	(India) Niranjaan Nandakumar (India) Ruban Kumar	(Thailand) Phattharin Aiamvareesrisakul (Thailand) Sarisa Janpeng	(Malaysia) Datu Anif Isaac Datu Asrah (Malaysia) Clarissa San
(Kazakhstan) Astana International	(Indonesia) Muhamad Yusuf	(Indonesia) Thalita Ramadhani Wiryawan	(Indonesia) Muhammad Rian Ardianto (Indonesia) Rahmat Hidayat	(Ukraine) Polina Buhrova (Ukraine) Yevheniia Kantemyr	(Indonesia) Bimo Prasetyo (Indonesia) Arlya Munggaran
Mongolia International	Cancelled				

==== International Series ====
Tour	Men's singles	Women's singles	Men's doubles	Women's doubles	Mixed doubles
(Estonia) Estonian International	(Finland) Joakim Oldorff	(Finland) Nella Nyqvist	(England) Chua Yue Chern (England) Kelvin Ho	(France) Margot Lambert (France) Camille Pognante	(England) Ethan van Leeuwen (England) Abbygael Harris
(Sweden) Swedish Open	(France) Arnaud Merklé	(Turkey) Neslihan Arın	(England) Chua Yue Chern (England) Kelvin Ho	(Turkey) Bengisu Erçetin (Turkey) Nazlıcan İnci	(France) Grégoire Deschamp (France) Margot Lambert
Sri Lanka International	(Indonesia) Jelang Fajar	(Thailand) Tidapron Kleebyeesun	(Malaysia) Bryan Goonting (Malaysia) Fazriq Razif	(Japan) Hina Osawa (Japan) Akari Sato	(Japan) Yuta Watanabe (Japan) Maya Taguchi
Portugal International	(Israel) Daniil Dubovenko	(Canada) Rachel Chan	(Germany) Bjarne Geiss (Germany) Jan Colin Völker	(France) Margot Lambert (France) Camille Pognante	(France) Grégoire Deschamp (France) Margot Lambert
(Netherlands) Dutch International	Cancelled				
(Thailand) Phuket International	(Chinese Taipei) Wang Po-wei	(Thailand) Tidapron Kleebyeesun	(China) Chen Xujun (China) Guo Ruohan	(Thailand) Tidapron Kleebyeesun (Thailand) Nattamon Laisuan	(China) Gao Jiaxuan (China) Wu Mengying
Luxembourg Open	(South Korea) Yoo Tae-bin	(Indonesia) Mutiara Ayu Puspitasari	(Indonesia) Raymond Indra (Indonesia) Nikolaus Joaquin	(Indonesia) Isyana Syahira Meida (Indonesia) Rinjani Kwinara Nastine	(Germany) Marvin Seidel (Germany) Thuc Phuong Nguyen
Slovenia Open	(Malaysia) Eogene Ewe	(Malaysia) Wong Ling Ching	(Chinese Taipei) Huang Tsung-i (Chinese Taipei) Lin Ting-yu	(Chinese Taipei) Lin Chih-chun (Chinese Taipei) Lin Wan-ching	(Chinese Taipei) Wu Guan-xun (Chinese Taipei) Lee Chia-hsin
Mauritius International	Cancelled				
(Austria) Austrian Open	(Denmark) Magnus Johannesen	(Denmark) Amalie Schulz	(Singapore) Donovan Wee (Singapore) Howin Wong	(France) Elsa Jacob (France) Anne Tran	(Spain) Rubén García (Spain) Lucía Rodríguez
(Northern Mariana Islands) Northern Marianas International	(South Korea) Yoo Tae-bin	(South Korea) Park Ga-eun	(South Korea) Kim Jae-hyeon (South Korea) Lee Sang-won	(South Korea) Jang Eun-seo (South Korea) Kim Yu-jung	(South Korea) Kim Jae-hyeon (South Korea) Kim Min-ji
(Italy) Italian Open	(Denmark) Ditlev Jæger Holm	(Turkey) Özge Bayrak	(Spain) Daniel Franco (Spain) Rodrigo Sanjurjo	(Bulgaria) Gabriela Stoeva (Bulgaria) Stefani Stoeva	(France) Thibault Gardon (France) Kathell Desmots-Chacun
Thailand International	(Indonesia) Christian Adinata	(Thailand) Tidapron Kleebyeesun	(Thailand) Narut Saengkham (Thailand) Apichasit Teerawiwat	(Japan) Mikoto Aiso (Japan) Momoha Niimi	(Malaysia) Wee Yee Hern (Malaysia) Chan Wen Tse
Ghana International	(Indonesia) Prahdiska Bagas Shujiwo	(Indonesia) Thalita Ramadhani Wiryawan	(Indonesia) Anselmus Prasetya (Indonesia) Pulung Ramadhan	(Indonesia) Isyana Syahira Meida (Indonesia) Rinjani Kwinara Nastine	(Indonesia) Bimo Prasetyo (Indonesia) Arlya Munggaran
Malaysia International	(South Korea) Park Sang-yong	(South Korea) Kim Seong-min	(Malaysia) Muhammad Faiq (Malaysia) Lok Hong Quan	(South Korea) Jang Eun-seo (South Korea) Kim Yu-jung	(South Korea) Kim Jae-hyeon (South Korea) Jang Eun-seo
(Peru) Perú International	(Guatemala) Kevin Cordón	(Brazil) Juliana Vieira	(Brazil) Fabrício Farias (Brazil) Davi Silva	(Brazil) Jaqueline Lima (Brazil) Sâmia Lima	(Brazil) Davi Silva (Brazil) Sânia Lima
(Poland) Polish International	(Denmark) William Bøgebjerg	(Chinese Taipei) Peng Yu-wei	(Japan) Shuji Sawada (Japan) Tsubasa Yoshida	(Japan) Yuma Nagasako (Japan) Aya Tamaki	(Japan) Shuji Sawada (Japan) Aya Tamaki
Uganda International	(Myanmar) Hein Htut	(India) Rujula Ramu	(Malaysia) Ashraf Zakaria (Malaysia) Ariffin Zakaria	(Switzerland) Jenjira Stadelmann (Switzerland) Leila Zarrouk	(Malaysia) Chong Zi Xiang (Malaysia) Joanne Ng
Algeria International	(Italy) Fabio Caponio	(Croatia) Jelena Buchberger	(Algeria) Koceila Mammeri (Algeria) Youcef Sabri Medel	(Italy) Martina Corsini (Italy) Emma Piccinin	(Algeria) Koceila Mammeri (Algeria) Tanina Mammeri
Egypt International	(Italy) Giovanni Toti	(India) Meghana Reddy	(Algeria) Koceila Mammeri (Algeria) Youcef Sabri Medel	(Switzerland) Lucie Amiguet (Switzerland) Caroline Racloz	(Algeria) Koceila Mammeri (Algeria) Tanina Mammeri
(Dominican Republic) Santo Domingo Open	(Brazil) Jonathan Matias	(United States) Ella Lin	(Canada) Clarence Chau (Canada) Wong Yan Kit	(Dominican Republic) Clarisa Pie (Dominican Republic) Nairoby Abigail Jiménez	(United States) Adrian Mar (United States) Ella Lin
Venezuela International	(Sri Lanka) Dumindu Abeywickrama	(Peru) Inés Castillo	(Cuba) Juan Bencomo (Cuba) Roberto Herrera	(Cuba) Leyanis Contreras (Cuba) Taymara Oropesa	(Cuba) Roberto Herrera (Cuba) Taymara Oropesa
Vietnam International (Ninh Bình)	(Indonesia) Jelang Fajar	(Vietnam) Vũ Thị Trang	(Thailand) Weeraphat Phakjarung (Thailand) Tanupat Viriyangkura	(Japan) Shinobu Hirata (Japan) Yuzuki Nakashima	(Indonesia) Aquino Evano Keneddy Tangka (Indonesia) Gloria Emanuelle Widjaja
Vietnam International (Bắc Giang)	(Vietnam) Lê Đức Phát	(Vietnam) Vũ Thị Trang	(Indonesia) Faizal Pangestu (Indonesia) Anju Siahaan	(South Korea) Jeon Jui (South Korea) Kim Ha-na	(Malaysia) Loh Zi Heng (Malaysia) Noraqilah Maisarah
(Hungary) Hungarian International	(Denmark) Jakob Houe	(Denmark) Laura Fløj Thomsen	(Chinese Taipei) Chen Hung-ming (Chinese Taipei) Tsai Cheng-han	(Denmark) Lærke Hvid (Denmark) Anna Klausholm	(Denmark) Mads Andersson (Denmark) Anna Klausholm
(Mexico) Mexican International	(United States) Mark Alcala	(United States) Disha Gupta	(India) Achutaditya Rao Doddavarapu (India) Arjun Reddy Pochana	(Mexico) Cecilia Madera (Mexico) Isabella Puente	(Mexico) Luis Montoya (Mexico) Miriam Rodríguez
(Norway) Norwegian International	(Chinese Taipei) Chiang Tzu-chieh	(Chinese Taipei) Liao Jui-chi	(Chinese Taipei) Chen Hung-ming (Chinese Taipei) Tsai Cheng-han	(Sweden) Malena Norrman (Sweden) Tilda Sjöö	(Sweden) Filip Karlborg (Sweden) Tilda Sjöö
Suriname International	(El Salvador) Uriel Canjura	(Switzerland) Dounia Pelupessy	(Peru) Adriano Viale (Israel) Misha Zilberman	(Italy) Martina Corsini (Italy) Emma Piccinin	(Trinidad and Tobago) Parth Mehta (Trinidad and Tobago) Chequeda de Boulet
Zambia International	(United Arab Emirates) Shashaank Sai Munnangi	(Italy) Yasmine Hamza	(India) Anuj Kale (India) Ian Lopes	(South Africa) Amy Ackerman (South Africa) Johanita Scholtz	(Maldives) Hussein Shaheed (Maldives) Fathimath Nabaaha Abdul Razzaq
Guatemala International	(Brazil) Jonathan Matias	(United States) Ella Lin	(Australia) Pramudya Kusumawardana (Australia) Jack Yu	(Lithuania) Viltė Paulauskaitė (Czech Republic) Sharleen van Coppenolle	(United States) Ryan Ma (United States) Ella Lin
(Wales) Welsh International	(Denmark) Ditlev Jæger Holm	(Austria) Xu Wei	(Denmark) Kristoffer Kolding (Denmark) Calvin Lundsgaard	(Denmark) Simona Pilgaard (Denmark) Signe Schulz	(France) Natan Begga (France) Elsa Jacob
Bangladesh International	(Kazakhstan) Dmitriy Panarin	(India) Tanvi Reddy Andluri	(Bangladesh) Gourab Singha (Bangladesh) Abdul Jahir Tanvir	(Thailand) Thitiwarada Buakaew (Thailand) Sarisa Janpeng	(Malaysia) Datu Anif Isaac Datu Asrah (Malaysia) Clarissa San

==== Future Series ====
Tour	Men's singles	Women's singles	Men's doubles	Women's doubles	Mixed doubles
Iceland International	(Denmark) Karan Rajan Rajarajan	(Scotland) Rachel Sugden	(Netherlands) Andy Buijk (France) Aymeric Tores	(Netherlands) Kirsten de Wit (Netherlands) Meerte Loos	(Denmark) Mikkel Klinggaard (Denmark) Nicoline Tang
(Cuba) Giraldilla International	(Guatemala) Yeison del Cid	(Italy) Yasmine Hamza	(Guatemala) Christopher Martínez (Guatemala) Jonathan Solís	(Cuba) Leyanis Contreras (Cuba) Taymara Oropesa	(Guatemala) Christopher Martínez (Guatemala) Diana Corleto
Malta International	(South Korea) Yoo Tae-bin	(Germany) Miranda Wilson	(Chinese Taipei) Chen Sheng-fa (Chinese Taipei) Lu Chen	(Poland) Anastasia Khomich (Poland) Ulyana Volskaya	(France) Louis Lefevre (France) Carla Martinez
(Slovakia) Slovak Open	(Belgium) Charles Fouyn	(India) Aalisha Naik	(Poland) Adrian Krawczyk (Poland) Szymon Ślepecki	(Malaysia) Low Zi Yu (Malaysia) Dania Sofea	(Serbia) Mihajlo Tomić (Serbia) Andjela Vitman
(Germany) Bonn International	(Canada) Joshua Nguyen	(Germany) Miranda Wilson	(Germany) Jonathan Dresp (Germany) Simon Krax	(France) Agathe Cuevas (France) Kathell Desmots-Chacun	(Germany) Jan Colin Völker (Germany) Stine Küspert
(Paraguay) Guaraní Open	(India) Dhruv Negi	(Peru) Namie Miyahira	(Canada) Clarence Chau (Canada) Wong Yan Kit	(Canada) Eyota Kwan (Canada) Johnna Rymes	(Canada) Clarence Chau (Canada) Eyota Kwan
Venezuela Future Series	(England) Rohan Thool	(Mexico) Vanessa García	(Brazil) Vinicius Eberling (Brazil) Gabriel Zink	(Brazil) Daiane Carvalho (Brazil) Maria Nascimento	(Mexico) Maximiliano Peregrina (Mexico) Miriam Rodríguez
Latvia International	(Malaysia) Lee Shun Yang	(Chinese Taipei) Wang Yu-si	(Spain) Jacob Fernandez (Spain) Alberto Perals	(Estonia) Catlyn Kruus (Estonia) Ramona Üprus	(Estonia) Mikk Õunmaa (Estonia) Ramona Üprus
(Czech Republic) Czech International	(Austria) Collins Filimon	(Chinese Taipei) Wang Yu-si	(Germany) Jonathan Dresp (Germany) Simon Krax	(Turkey) Yasemen Bektaş (Turkey) Sinem Yıldız	(Germany) Simon Krax (Germany) Amelie Lehmann
(France) Future Series Nouvelle-Aquitaine	(Malaysia) Lim Ming Hong	(India) Meghana Reddy	(Spain) Daniel Franco (Spain) Rodrigo Sanjurjo	(Spain) Nikol Carulla (Spain) Carmen Maria Jiménez	(Netherlands) Andy Buijk (Netherlands) Meerte Loos
Bolivia International	(Guatemala) Kevin Cordón	(Mexico) Sabrina Solís	(Peru) Gonzalo Castillo (Peru) Sharum Durand	(Cuba) Leyanis Contreras (Cuba) Taymara Oropesa	(Peru) Sharum Durand (Peru) Namie Miyahira
Mexico Future Series	(United States) Mark Alcala	(United States) Ella Lin	(Denmark) Emil Langemark (Denmark) Mikkel Langemark	(Canada) Eyota Kwan (Canada) Johnna Rymes	(United States) Adrian Mar (United States) Ella Lin
Guatemala Future Series	(Guatemala) Kevin Cordón	(Colombia) Juliana Giraldo	(Denmark) Emil Langemark (Denmark) Mikkel Langemark	(Guatemala) Diana Corleto (Guatemala) Nikté Sotomayor	(Guatemala) Christopher Martínez (Guatemala) Diana Corleto
Slovenia Future Series	(Japan) Minoru Koga	(Israel) Heli Neiman	(Germany) Marvin Datko (Germany) Aaron Sonnenschein	(Czech Republic) Kateřina Osladilová (Czech Republic) Sharleen van Coppenolle	(Slovenia) Miha Ivančič (Slovenia) Petra Polanc
Iran International Khazar (Caspian) Cup	(Kazakhstan) Dmitriy Panarin	(Iran) Paria Eskandari	(Iran) Mehdi Ansari (Iran) Amirhossein Hasani	(Iran) Artina Aghapour Hasiri (Iran) Hana Molakarimi	(Kazakhstan) Dmitriy Panarin (Kazakhstan) Nargiza Rakhmetullayeva
Costa Rica Future Series	(Guatemala) Kevin Cordón	(Italy) Yasmine Hamza	(Denmark) Emil Langemark (Denmark) Mikkel Langemark	(Spain) Amaia Torralba (Spain) Jana Villanueva	(Spain) Vicente Gázquez (Spain) Amaia Torralba
(Lithuania) Lithuanian International	(Italy) Christopher Vittoriani	(France) Lole Courtois	(Switzerland) Yann Orteu (Switzerland) Minh Quang Pham	(Ukraine) Maria Koriagina (Ukraine) Yaroslava Vantsarovska	(Sweden) Max Svensson (Sweden) Sofia Strömvall
(Colombia) La Perla del Otun	(United States) Enrico Asuncion	(Peru) Inés Castillo	(United States) Enrico Asuncion (Malta) Samuel Cassar	(Colombia) Juliana Giraldo (Colombia) Karen Patiño	(Argentina) Nicolas Oliva (Argentina) Ailén Oliva
(Uganda) Kampala International	(India) Harsheel Dani	(India) Rujula Ramu	(Malaysia) Ariffin Zakaria (Malaysia) Ashraf Zakaria	(Switzerland) Jenjira Stadelmann (Switzerland) Leila Zarrouk	(Malaysia) Ashraf Zakaria (Malaysia) Lim Xuan
(Croatia) Croatian International	(Chinese Taipei) Huang Yu	(Japan) Yuma Nagasako	(Japan) Shuji Sawada (Japan) Tsubasa Yoshida	(Japan) Yuma Nagasako (Japan) Aya Tamaki	(Japan) Shuji Sawada (Japan) Aya Tamaki
(Bulgaria) Bulgarian International	(Bulgaria) Dimitar Yanakiev	(Turkey) Zehra Erdem	(Poland) Adrian Krawczyk (Poland) Szymon Ślepecki	(Czech Republic) KateřIna Osladilová (Czech Republic) Sharleen van Coppenolle	(Serbia) Andrija Doder (Serbia) Sara Lončar
Israel Open	Cancelled				
Trinidad and Tobago International	(Switzerland) Julien Scheiwiller	(Italy) Gianna Stiglich	(Slovakia) Andrej Suchý (Slovakia) Simeon Suchý	(Jamaica) Breanna Bisnott (Jamaica) Tahlia Richardson	(Trinidad and Tobago) Parth Mehta (Trinidad and Tobago) Chequeda de Boulet
(Turkey) Türkiye International	(Italy) Christopher Vittoriani	(Turkey) Özge Bayrak	(Turkey) Buğra Aktaş (Turkey) Emre Sönmez	(Turkey) Yasemen Bektaş (Turkey) Sinem Yıldız	(Turkey) Emre Sönmez (Turkey) Yasemen Bektaş
Botswana International	(Vietnam) Phan Phúc Thịnh	(South Africa) Johanita Scholtz	(India) Tanmoy Bikash Boruah (India) Kuldeep Kamal	(South Africa) Amy Ackerman (South Africa) Johanita Scholtz	(South Africa) Robert Summers (South Africa) Amy Ackerman
South Africa International	(Vietnam) Phan Phúc Thịnh	(Chinese Taipei) Lee Yu-hsuan	(Australia) Avinash Srinivas (Australia) Ephraim Stephen Sam	(South Africa) Amy Ackerman (South Africa) Johanita Scholtz	(Saudi Arabia) Amer Mohammed (Saudi Arabia) Nabiha Shariff
El Salvador International	(Brazil) Jonathan Matias	(Lithuania) Viltė Paulauskaitė	(Australia) Pramudya Kusumawardana (Australia) Jack Yu	(Lithuania) Viltė Paulauskaitė (Czech Republic) Sharleen van Coppenolle	(United States) Ansen Liu (United States) Charity Lam

== Statistics ==
=== Performance by countries ===
Below are the 2025 BWF Continental Circuit performances by country. Only countries that have won a title are listed:

==== International Challenge ====
Rank	Team	IRN	SGP	UGA	SRI	POL	VIE	MEX	DEN	REU	NMI	SAI	MAS	THA	CMR	NGR	BEL	GUA	NED	NZL	SYD	TUR	BND	CZE	IND1	IND2	IRL	INA1	INA2	SCO	CAN	BAN	KAZ	Total
1	Indonesia		4		2	1			2					2	4	3								1				4	2				4	29
2	Japan				2		2	4	1	1	5	3	1	1			1	1			1		2											25
3	India	3		3					1	2		1	1		1	1						2			3	4						2		24
4	Chinese Taipei					1													1	5	4		3					1	2					17
5	Denmark																2		1					3			1			2				9
6	France					1			1										3								1			1				7
6	South Korea		1									1	1														2		1	1				7
8	Canada																	2													4			6
8	Thailand						1							2											1	1						1		6
8	United States			2		1		1																							1	1		6
11	Bulgaria	1															2					1		1										5
12	Malaysia				1								2																			1		4
13	Turkey	1				1																1												3
14	England																					1					1							2
15	(Individual Neutral Athletes) Authorised Neutral Athletes															1																		1
15	Brazil																	1																1
15	Germany									1																								1
15	Hong Kong						1																											1
15	Scotland																													1				1
15	Singapore																								1									1
15	Sri Lanka																	1																1
15	Sweden									1																								1
15	Vietnam						1																											1
15	Ukraine																																1	1

==== International Series ====
Rank	Team	EST	SWE	SRI	POR	THA1	LUX	SLO	AUT	NMI	ITA	THA2	GHA	MAS	PER	POL	UGA	ALG	EGY	DOM	VEN	VIE1	VIE2	HUN	MEX	NOR	SUR	ZAM	GUA	WAL	BAN	Total
1	Indonesia			1			3					1	5									2	1									13
2	Denmark								2		1					1								4						3		11
2	South Korea						1			5				4									1									11
4	Chinese Taipei					1		3								1								1		3						9
4	Malaysia			1				2				1		1			2						1								1	9
6	France	1	2		2				1		1																			1		8
7	Japan			2								1				3						1										7
7	Thailand			1		2						2										1									1	7
9	Brazil														4					1									1			6
9	United States																			2					2				2			6
11	India																1		1						1			1			1	5
11	Italy																	2	1								1	1				5
13	Algeria																	2	2													4
14	Cuba																				3											3
14	England	2	1																													3
14	Switzerland																1		1								1					3
14	Turkey		2								1																					3
14	Vietnam																					1	2									3
19	Canada				1															1												2
19	China					2																										2
19	Finland	2																														2
19	Germany				1		1																									2
19	Mexico																								2							2
19	Spain								1		1																					2
19	Sweden																									2						2
26	Israel				1																						0.5					1.5
26	Peru																				1						0.5					1.5
28	Australia																												1			1
28	Austria																													1		1
28	Bangladesh																														1	1
28	Bulgaria										1																					1
28	Croatia																	1														1
28	Dominican Republic																			1												1
28	El Salvador																										1					1
28	Guatemala														1																	1
28	Kazakhstan																														1	1
28	Maldives																											1				1
28	Myanmar																1															1
28	Singapore								1																							1
28	South Africa																											1				1
28	Sri Lanka																				1											1
28	Trinidad and Tobago																										1					1
28	United Arab Emirates																											1				1
44	Czech Republic																												0.5			0.5
44	Lithuania																												0.5			0.5

==== Future Series ====
Rank	Team	ISL	CUB	MLT	SVK	GER	PAR	VEN	LAT	CZE	FRA	BOL	MEX	GUA	SVN	IRN	CRC	LTU	COL	UGA	CRO	BUL	TTO	TUR	BOT	RSA	SLV	Total
1	Guatemala		3									1		3			1											8
2	Germany			1		3				2					1													7
3	India				1		1				1									2					1			6
3	Turkey									1												1		4				6
5	United States												3						1.5								1	5.5
6	Canada					1	3						1															5
6	Chinese Taipei			1					1	1											1					1		5
6	Denmark	2											1	1			1											5
6	Italy		1														1	1					1	1				5
6	Japan														1						4							5
6	Malaysia				1				1		1									2								5
6	Spain								1		2						2											5
13	Peru						1					2							1									4
13	South Africa																								3	1		4
15	France	0.5		1		1												1										3.5
16	Brazil							2																			1	3
16	Iran															3												3
16	Mexico							2				1																3
16	Poland			1	1																	1						3
16	Switzerland																	1		1			1					3
21	Czech Republic														1							1					0.5	2.5
21	Netherlands	1.5									1																	2.5
23	Australia																									1	1	2
23	Colombia													1					1									2
23	Cuba		1									1																2
23	Estonia								2																			2
23	Kazakhstan															2												2
23	Serbia				1																	1						2
23	Vietnam																								1	1		2
30	Lithuania																										1.5	1.5
31	Argentina																		1									1
31	Austria									1																		1
31	Belgium				1																							1
31	Bulgaria																					1						1
31	England							1																				1
31	Israel														1													1
31	Jamaica																						1					1
31	Saudi Arabia																									1		1
31	Scotland	1																										1
31	Slovakia																						1					1
31	Slovenia														1													1
31	South Korea			1																								1
31	Sweden																	1										1
31	Trinidad and Tobago																						1					1
31	Ukraine																	1										1
46	Malta																		0.5									0.5

=== Performance by categories ===
These tables were calculated after the finals of the Bangladesh International.

==== Men's singles ====
Rank	Player	IC	IS	FS	Total
1	(France) Arnaud Merklé	5	1		6
2	(Indonesia) Prahdiska Bagas Shujiwo	3	1		4
3	(Guatemala) Kevin Cordón		1	3	4
4	(United States) Mark Alcala	1	1	1	3
5	(Brazil) Jonathan Matias		2	1	3
5	(South Korea) Yoo Tae-bin		2	1	3
7	(India) Manraj Singh	2			2
7	(Indonesia) Muhamad Yusuf	2			2
7	(Japan) Riki Takei	2			2
10	(Chinese Taipei) Wang Po-wei	1	1		2
10	(Malaysia) Eogene Ewe	1	1		2
10	(Sri Lanka) Dumindu Abeywickrama	1	1		2
13	(Japan) Minoru Koga	1		1	2
14	(Denmark) Ditlev Jæger Holm		2		2
14	(Indonesia) Jelang Fajar		2		2
16	(Kazakhstan) Dmitriy Panarin		1	1	2
17	(Italy) Christopher Vittoriani			2	2
17	(Vietnam) Phan Phúc Thịnh			2	2
19	(Canada) Victor Lai	1			1
19	(Chinese Taipei) Liao Jhuo-fu	1			1
19	(Chinese Taipei) Wang Yu-kai	1			1
19	(England) Harry Huang	1			1
19	(India) Meiraba Maisnam	1			1
19	(India) Rithvik Sanjeevi	1			1
19	(India) Ginpaul Sonna	1			1
19	(Indonesia) Richie Duta Richardo	1			1
19	(Indonesia) Zaki Ubaidillah	1			1
19	(Japan) Toma Noda	1			1
19	(Japan) Yudai Okimoto	1			1
19	(Malaysia) Aidil Sholeh	1			1
19	(Thailand) Puritat Arree	1			1
32	(Chinese Taipei) Chiang Tzu-chieh		1		1
32	(Denmark) William Bøgebjerg		1		1
32	(Denmark) Jakob Houe		1		1
32	(Denmark) Magnus Johannesen		1		1
32	(El Salvador) Uriel Canjura		1		1
32	(Finland) Joakim Oldorff		1		1
32	(Indonesia) Christian Adinata		1		1
32	(Israel) Daniil Dubovenko		1		1
32	(Italy) Fabio Caponio		1		1
32	(Italy) Giovanni Toti		1		1
32	(Myanmar) Hein Htut		1		1
32	(South Korea) Park Sang-yong		1		1
32	(United Arab Emirates) Shashaank Sai Munnangi		1		1
32	(Vietnam) Lê Đức Phát		1		1
46	(Austria) Collins Valentine Filimon			1	1
46	(Belgium) Charles Fouyn			1	1
46	(Bulgaria) Dimitar Yanakiev			1	1
46	(Canada) Joshua Nguyen			1	1
46	(Chinese Taipei) Huang Yu			1	1
46	(Denmark) Karan Rajan Rajarajan			1	1
46	(England) Rohan Thool			1	1
46	(Guatemala) Yeison del Cid			1	1
46	(India) Harsheel Dani			1	1
46	(India) Dhruv Negi			1	1
46	(Malaysia) Lee Shun Yang			1	1
46	(Malaysia) Lim Ming Hong			1	1
46	(Switzerland) Julien Scheiwiller			1	1
46	(United States) Enrico Asuncion			1	1

==== Women's singles ====
Rank	Player	IC	IS	FS	Total
1	(Indonesia) Thalita Ramadhani Wiryawan	3	1		4
1	(Turkey) Neslihan Arın	3	1		4
3	(Thailand) Tidapron Kleebyeesun		3		3
4	(United States) Ella Lin		2	1	3
5	(Italy) Yasmine Hamza		1	2	3
6	(Bulgaria) Kaloyana Nalbantova	2			2
6	(India) Mansi Singh	2			2
6	(Japan) Sakura Masuki	2			2
6	(Japan) Manami Suizu	2			2
6	(United States) Ishika Jaiswal	2			2
11	(Canada) Rachel Chan	1	1		2
12	(Vietnam) Vũ Thị Trang		2		2
13	(India) Rujula Ramu		1	1	2
13	(India) Meghana Reddy		1	1	2
13	(Peru) Inés Castillo		1	1	2
13	(Turkey) Özge Bayrak		1	1	2
16	(Chinese Taipei) Wang Yu-si			2	2
16	(Germany) Miranda Wilson			2	2
19	(Canada) Michelle Li	1			1
19	(Chinese Taipei) Chen Su-yu	1			1
19	(Chinese Taipei) Huang Ching-ping	1			1
19	(Chinese Taipei) Tung Ciou-tong	1			1
19	(India) Isharani Baruah	1			1
19	(India) Tanya Hemanth	1			1
19	(India) Shreya Lele	1			1
19	(India) Tanvi Sharma	1			1
19	(India) Devika Sihag	1			1
19	(Indonesia) Ruzana	1			1
19	(Japan) Nodoka Sunakawa	1			1
19	(Scotland) Kirsty Gilmour	1			1
19	(South Korea) Kim Ga-ram	1			1
19	(South Korea) Kim Min-ji	1			1
19	(Thailand) Anyapat Phichitpreechasak	1			1
34	(Austria) Xu Wei		1		1
34	(Brazil) Juliana Vieira		1		1
34	(Chinese Taipei) Liao Jui-chi		1		1
34	(Chinese Taipei) Peng Yu-wei		1		1
34	(Croatia) Jelena Buchberger		1		1
34	(Denmark) Amalie Schulz		1		1
34	(Denmark) Laura Fløj Thomsen		1		1
34	(Finland) Nella Nyqvist		1		1
34	(India) Tanvi Reddy Andluri		1		1
34	(Indonesia) Mutiara Ayu Puspitasari		1		1
34	(Malaysia) Wong Ling Ching		1		1
34	(South Korea) Kim Seong-min		1		1
34	(South Korea) Park Ga-eun		1		1
34	(Switzerland) Dounia Pelupessy		1		1
34	(United States) Disha Gupta		1		1
49	(Chinese Taipei) Lee Yu-hsuan			1	1
49	(Colombia) Juliana Giraldo			1	1
49	(France) Lole Courtois			1	1
49	(India) Aalisha Naik			1	1
49	(Iran) Paria Eskandari			1	1
49	(Israel) Heli Neiman			1	1
49	(Italy) Gianna Stiglich			1	1
49	(Japan) Yuma Nagasako			1	1
49	(Lithuania) Viltė Paulauskaitė			1	1
49	(Mexico) Vanessa García			1	1
49	(Mexico) Sabrina Solís			1	1
49	(Peru) Namie Miyahira			1	1
49	(Scotland) Rachel Sugden			1	1
49	(South Africa) Johanita Scholtz			1	1
49	(Turkey) Zehra Erdem			1	1

==== Men's doubles ====
Rank	Players	IC	IS	FS	Total
1	(Indonesia) Raymond Indra	3	1		4
1	(Indonesia) Nikolaus Joaquin	3	1		4
3	(India) Hariharan Amsakarunan	3			3
3	(India) Arjun M. R.	3			3
5	(Denmark) Emil Langemark			3	3
5	(Denmark) Mikkel Langemark			3	3
7	(Chinese Taipei) Su Ching-heng	2			2
7	(Chinese Taipei) Wu Guan-xun	2			2
7	(India) Ruban Kumar	2			2
7	(Indonesia) Ali Faathir Rayhan	2			2
7	(Indonesia) Devin Artha Wahyudi	2			2
7	(Japan) Haruki Kawabe	2			2
7	(Japan) Kenta Matsukawa	2			2
14	(Brazil) Fabrício Farias	1	1		2
14	(Brazil) Davi Silva	1	1		2
14	(Denmark) Kristoffer Kolding	1	1		2
14	(Denmark) Calvin Lundsgaard	1	1		2
18	(Algeria) Koceila Mammeri		2		2
18	(Algeria) Youcef Sabri Medel		2		2
18	(Chinese Taipei) Chen Hung-ming		2		2
18	(Chinese Taipei) Tsai Cheng-han		2		2
18	(England) Chua Yue Chern		2		2
18	(England) Kelvin Ho		2		2
24	(Australia) Pramudya Kusumawardana		1	1	2
24	(Australia) Jack Yu		1	1	2
24	(Canada) Clarence Chau		1	1	2
24	(Canada) Wong Yan Kit		1	1	2
24	(Japan) Shuji Sawada		1	1	2
24	(Japan) Tsubasa Yoshida		1	1	2
24	(Malaysia) Ariffin Zakaria		1	1	2
24	(Malaysia) Ashraf Zakaria		1	1	2
24	(Spain) Daniel Franco		1	1	2
24	(Spain) Rodrigo Sanjurjo		1	1	2
34	(Germany) Jonathan Dresp			2	2
34	(Germany) Simon Krax			2	2
34	(Poland) Adrian Krawczyk			2	2
34	(Poland) Szymon Ślepecki			2	2
38	(Individual Neutral Athletes) Rodion Alimov	1			1
38	(Individual Neutral Athletes) Maksim Ogloblin	1			1
38	(Chinese Taipei) Chen Zhi-ray	1			1
38	(Chinese Taipei) Lin Yu-chieh	1			1
38	(Denmark) Rasmus Espersen	1			1
38	(Denmark) Daniel Lundgaard	1			1
38	(Denmark) Andreas Søndergaard	1			1
38	(Denmark) Mads Vestergaard	1			1
38	(England) Alex Green	1			1
38	(England) Zach Russ	1			1
38	(France) Maël Cattoen	1			1
38	(France) Lucas Renoir	1			1
38	(India) Mohammad Amaan	1			1
38	(India) Suraj Goala	1			1
38	(India) Dingku Konthoujam	1			1
38	(India) Niranjaan Nandakumar	1			1
38	(India) Vishnuvardhan Panjala	1			1
38	(India) Dhruv Rawat	1			1
38	(Indonesia) Muhammad Rian Ardianto	1			1
38	(Indonesia) Putra Erwiansyah	1			1
38	(Indonesia) Rahmat Hidayat	1			1
38	(Indonesia) Daniel Edgar Marvino	1			1
38	(Japan) Naoya Kawashima	1			1
38	(Japan) Akira Koga	1			1
38	(Japan) Kakeru Kumagai	1			1
38	(Japan) Keiichiro Matsui	1			1
38	(Japan) Hiroki Nishi	1			1
38	(Japan) Katsuki Tamate	1			1
38	(Singapore) Wesley Koh	1			1
38	(Singapore) Junsuke Kubo	1			1
38	(United States) Chen Zhi Yi	1			1
38	(United States) Presley Smith	1			1
38	(Vietnam) Nguyễn Đình Hoàng	1			1
38	(Vietnam) Trần Đình Mạnh	1			1
72	(Bangladesh) Gourab Singha		1		1
72	(Bangladesh) Abdul Jahir Tanvir		1		1
72	(China) Chen Xujun		1		1
72	(China) Guo Ruohan		1		1
72	(Chinese Taipei) Huang Tsung-i		1		1
72	(Chinese Taipei) Lin Ting-yu		1		1
72	(Cuba) Juan Carlos Bencomo Otaño		1		1
72	(Cuba) Roberto Carlos Herrera Vazquez		1		1
72	(Germany) Bjarne Geiss		1		1
72	(Germany) Jan Colin Völker		1		1
72	(India) Achutaditya Rao Doddavarapu		1		1
72	(India) Anuj Kale		1		1
72	(India) Ian Lopes		1		1
72	(India) Arjun Reddy Pochana		1		1
72	(Indonesia) Faizal Pangestu		1		1
72	(Indonesia) Anselmus Prasetya		1		1
72	(Indonesia) Pulung Ramadhan		1		1
72	(Indonesia) Anju Siahaan		1		1
72	(Israel) Misha Zilberman		1		1
72	(Malaysia) Muhammad Faiq		1		1
72	(Malaysia) Bryan Goonting		1		1
72	(Malaysia) Lok Hong Quan		1		1
72	(Malaysia) Fazriq Razif		1		1
72	(Peru) Adriano Viale		1		1
72	(Singapore) Donovan Wee		1		1
72	(Singapore) Howin Wong		1		1
72	(South Korea) Kim Jae-hyeon		1		1
72	(South Korea) Lee Sang-won		1		1
72	(Thailand) Weeraphat Phakjarung		1		1
72	(Thailand) Narut Saengkham		1		1
72	(Thailand) Apichasit Teerawiwat		1		1
72	(Thailand) Tanupat Viriyangkura		1		1
104	(Australia) Avinash Srinivas			1	1
104	(Australia) Ephraim Stephen Sam			1	1
104	(Brazil) Vinicius Eberling			1	1
104	(Brazil) Gabriel Zink			1	1
104	(Chinese Taipei) Chen Sheng-fa			1	1
104	(Chinese Taipei) Lu Chen			1	1
104	(France) Aymeric Tores			1	1
104	(Germany) Marvin Datko			1	1
104	(Germany) Aaron Sonnenschein			1	1
104	(Guatemala) Christopher Martínez			1	1
104	(Guatemala) Jonathan Solís			1	1
104	(India) Tanmoy Bikash Boruah			1	1
104	(India) Kuldeep Kamal			1	1
104	(Iran) Mehdi Ansari			1	1
104	(Iran) Amirhossein Hasani			1	1
104	(Malta) Samuel Cassar			1	1
104	(Netherlands) Andy Buijk			1	1
104	(Peru) Gonzalo Castillo			1	1
104	(Peru) Sharum Durand			1	1
104	(Slovakia) Andrej Suchý			1	1
104	(Slovakia) Simeon Suchý			1	1
104	(Spain) Jacob Fernandez			1	1
104	(Spain) Alberto Perals			1	1
104	(Switzerland) Yann Orteu			1	1
104	(Switzerland) Minh Quang Pham			1	1
104	(Turkey) Buğra Aktaş			1	1
104	(Turkey) Emre Sönmez			1	1
104	(United States) Enrico Asuncion			1	1

==== Women's doubles ====
Rank	Players	IC	IS	FS	Total
1	(Bulgaria) Gabriela Stoeva	3	1		4
1	(Bulgaria) Stefani Stoeva	3	1		4
3	(Indonesia) Isyana Syahira Meida	2	2		4
3	(Indonesia) Rinjani Kwinara Nastine	2	2		4
5	(Czech Republic) Sharleen van Coppenolle		1	3	4
6	(Chinese Taipei) Lin Chih-chun	2	1		3
6	(Chinese Taipei) Lin Wan-ching	2	1		3
6	(Japan) Hina Osawa	2	1		3
6	(Japan) Akari Sato	2	1		3
10	(South Korea) Jang Eun-seo	1	2		3
11	(Cuba) Leyanis Contreras		1	2	3
11	(Cuba) Taymara Oropesa		1	2	3
11	(South Africa) Amy Ackerman		1	2	3
11	(South Africa) Johanita Scholtz		1	2	3
15	(Chinese Taipei) Chen Su-yu	2			2
15	(Chinese Taipei) Hsieh Yi-en	2			2
15	(South Korea) Kim Min-ji	2			2
15	(South Korea) Lee Ye-na	2			2
15	(Thailand) Hathaithip Mijad	2			2
15	(Thailand) Napapakorn Tungkasatan	2			2
15	(United States) Lauren Lam	2			2
15	(United States) Allison Lee	2			2
23	(France) Elsa Jacob	1	1		2
23	(Japan) Mikoto Aiso	1	1		2
23	(Japan) Momoha Niimi	1	1		2
23	(South Korea) Jeon Jui	1	1		2
23	(South Korea) Kim Ha-na	1	1		2
23	(Sweden) Tilda Sjöö	1	1		2
23	(Thailand) Sarisa Janpeng	1	1		2
30	(France) Margot Lambert		2		2
30	(France) Camille Pognante		2		2
30	(Italy) Martina Corsini		2		2
30	(Italy) Emma Piccinin		2		2
30	(South Korea) Kim Yu-jung		2		2
35	(Japan) Yuma Nagasako		1	1	2
35	(Japan) Aya Tamaki		1	1	2
35	(Lithuania) Viltė Paulauskaitė		1	1	2
35	(Switzerland) Jenjira Stadelmann		1	1	2
35	(Switzerland) Leila Zarrouk		1	1	2
40	(Canada) Eyota Kwan			2	2
40	(Canada) Johnna Rymes			2	2
40	(Czech Republic) Kateřina Osladilová			2	2
40	(Turkey) Yasemen Bektaş			2	2
40	(Turkey) Sinem Yıldız			2	2
45	(Canada) Jackie Dent	1			1
45	(Canada) Crystal Lai	1			1
45	(Chinese Taipei) Sung Yi-hsuan	1			1
45	(Chinese Taipei) Tsai Hsin-pei	1			1
45	(Denmark) Natasja Anthonisen	1			1
45	(Denmark) Amalie Cecilie Kudsk	1			1
45	(France) Flavie Vallet	1			1
45	(Japan) Mao Hatasue	1			1
45	(Japan) Ririna Hiramoto	1			1
45	(Japan) Sayaka Hirota	1			1
45	(Japan) Kokona Ishikawa	1			1
45	(Japan) Maiko Kawazoe	1			1
45	(Japan) Kanano Muroya	1			1
45	(Japan) Kaho Osawa	1			1
45	(Japan) Hinata Suzuki	1			1
45	(Japan) Mai Tanabe	1			1
45	(Japan) Nao Yamakita	1			1
45	(South Korea) Lee Seo-jin	1			1
45	(Sweden) Moa Sjöö	1			1
45	(Thailand) Phattharin Aiamvareesrisakul	1			1
45	(Ukraine) Polina Buhrova	1			1
45	(Ukraine) Yevheniia Kantemyr	1			1
67	(Brazil) Jaqueline Lima		1		1
67	(Brazil) Sâmia Lima		1		1
67	(Denmark) Lærke Hvid		1		1
67	(Denmark) Anna Klausholm		1		1
67	(Denmark) Simona Pilgaard		1		1
67	(Denmark) Signe Schulz		1		1
67	(Dominican Republic) Nairoby Abigail Jiménez		1		1
67	(Dominican Republic) Clarisa Pie		1		1
67	(France) Anne Tran		1		1
67	(Japan) Shinobu Hirata		1		1
67	(Japan) Yuzuki Nakashima		1		1
67	(Mexico) Cecilia Madera		1		1
67	(Mexico) Isabella Puente		1		1
67	(Sweden) Malena Norrman		1		1
67	(Switzerland) Lucie Amiguet		1		1
67	(Switzerland) Caroline Racloz		1		1
67	(Thailand) Thitiwarada Buakaew		1		1
67	(Thailand) Tidapron Kleebyeesun		1		1
67	(Thailand) Nattamon Laisuan		1		1
67	(Turkey) Bengisu Erçetin		1		1
67	(Turkey) Nazlıcan İnci		1		1
88	(Brazil) Daiane Carvalho			1	1
88	(Brazil) Maria Nascimento			1	1
88	(Colombia) Juliana Giraldo			1	1
88	(Colombia) Karen Patiño			1	1
88	(Estonia) Catlyn Kruus			1	1
88	(Estonia) Ramona Üprus			1	1
88	(France) Agathe Cuevas			1	1
88	(France) Kathell Desmots-Chacun			1	1
88	(Guatemala) Diana Corleto			1	1
88	(Guatemala) Nikté Sotomayor			1	1
88	(Iran) Artina Aghapour Hasiri			1	1
88	(Iran) Hana Molakarimi			1	1
88	(Jamaica) Breanna Bisnott			1	1
88	(Jamaica) Tahlia Richardson			1	1
88	(Malaysia) Low Zi Yu			1	1
88	(Malaysia) Dania Sofea			1	1
88	(Netherlands) Kirsten de Wit			1	1
88	(Netherlands) Meerte Loos			1	1
88	(Poland) Anastasia Khomich			1	1
88	(Poland) Ulyana Volskaya			1	1
88	(Spain) Nikol Carulla			1	1
88	(Spain) Carmen Jiménez			1	1
88	(Spain) Amaia Torralba			1	1
88	(Spain) Jana Villanueva			1	1
88	(Ukraine) Maria Koriagina			1	1
88	(Ukraine) Yaroslava Vantsarovska			1	1

==== Mixed doubles ====
Rank	Players	IC	IS	FS	Total
1	(Denmark) Rasmus Espersen	4			4
1	(Denmark) Amalie Cecilie Kudsk	4			4
1	(Indonesia) Bobby Setiabudi	4			4
1	(Indonesia) Melati Daeva Oktavianti	4			4
5	(Chinese Taipei) Lee Chia-hsin	2	1		3
5	(Chinese Taipei) Wu Guan-xun	2	1		3
5	(Indonesia) Arlya Munggaran	2	1		3
5	(Indonesia) Bimo Prasetyo	2	1		3
9	(United States) Ella Lin		2	1	3
10	(Canada) Chloe Hoang	2			2
10	(Canada) Timothy Lock	2			2
10	(India) Ishaan Bhatnagar	2			2
10	(India) Srinidhi Narayanan	2			2
10	(Japan) Yuho Imai	2			2
10	(Japan) Akira Koga	2			2
16	(Germany) Thuc Phuong Nguyen	1	1		2
16	(Germany) Marvin Seidel	1	1		2
16	(Indonesia) Gloria Emanuelle Widjaja	1	1		2
16	(Malaysia) Datu Anif Isaac Datu Asrah	1	1		2
16	(Malaysia) Clarissa San	1	1		2
21	(Algeria) Koceila Mammeri		2		2
21	(Algeria) Tanina Mammeri		2		2
21	(France) Grégoire Deschamp		2		2
21	(France) Margot Lambert		2		2
21	(South Korea) Kim Jae-hyeon		2		2
26	(Japan) Shuji Sawada		1	1	2
26	(Japan) Aya Tamaki		1	1	2
26	(Mexico) Miriam Rodríguez		1	1	2
26	(Trinidad and Tobago) Chequeda de Boulet		1	1	2
26	(Trinidad and Tobago) Parth Mehta		1	1	2
26	(United States) Adrian Mar		1	1	2
32	(Guatemala) Diana Corleto			2	2
32	(Guatemala) Christopher Martínez			2	2
34	(Chinese Taipei) Lee Chih-chen	1			1
34	(Chinese Taipei) Lin Yu-chieh	1			1
34	(Denmark) Kristoffer Kolding	1			1
34	(Denmark) Mette Werge	1			1
34	(Hong Kong) Ng Tsz Yau	1			1
34	(Hong Kong) Tang Chun Man	1			1
34	(India) Hariharan Amsakarunan	1			1
34	(India) Treesa Jolly	1			1
34	(India) Sathwik Reddy Kanapuram	1			1
34	(India) K. Maneesha	1			1
34	(India) Dhruv Rawat	1			1
34	(India) Reshika Uthayasooriyan	1			1
34	(Indonesia) M. Nawaf Khoiriyansyah	1			1
34	(Indonesia) Rehan Naufal Kusharjanto	1			1
34	(Indonesia) Nahya Muhyifa	1			1
34	(Indonesia) Zaidan Nabawi	1			1
34	(Indonesia) Jessica Rismawardani	1			1
34	(Malaysia) Tan Zhi Yang	1			1
34	(Malaysia) Nicole Tan	1			1
34	(South Korea) An Yun-seong	1			1
34	(South Korea) Lee Yu-lim	1			1
34	(Thailand) Phuwanat Horbanluekit	1			1
34	(Thailand) Fungfa Korpthammakit	1			1
57	(Brazil) Sânia Lima		1		1
57	(Brazil) Davi Silva		1		1
57	(China) Gao Jiaxuan		1		1
57	(China) Wu Mengying		1		1
57	(Cuba) Roberto Carlos Herrera Vazquez		1		1
57	(Cuba) Taymara Oropesa		1		1
57	(Denmark) Mads Andersson		1		1
57	(Denmark) Anna Klausholm		1		1
57	(England) Abbygael Harris		1		1
57	(England) Ethan van Leeuwen		1		1
57	(France) Natan Begga		1		1
57	(France) Kathell Desmots-Chacun		1		1
57	(France) Thibault Gardon		1		1
57	(France) Elsa Jacob		1		1
57	(Indonesia) Aquino Evano Keneddy Tangka		1		1
57	(Japan) Maya Taguchi		1		1
57	(Japan) Yuta Watanabe		1		1
57	(Maldives) Fathimath Nabaaha Abdul Razzaq		1		1
57	(Maldives) Hussein Shaheed		1		1
57	(Malaysia) Chan Wen Tse		1		1
57	(Malaysia) Chong Zi Xiang		1		1
57	(Malaysia) Loh Ziheng		1		1
57	(Malaysia) Noraqilah Maisarah		1		1
57	(Malaysia) Joanne Ng		1		1
57	(Malaysia) Wee Yee Hern		1		1
57	(Mexico) Luis Montoya		1		1
57	(South Korea) Jang Eun-seo		1		1
57	(South Korea) Kim Min-ji		1		1
57	(Spain) Rubén García		1		1
57	(Spain) Lucía Rodríguez		1		1
57	(Sweden) Filip Karlborg		1		1
57	(Sweden) Tilda Sjöö		1		1
57	(United States) Ryan Ma		1		1
90	(Argentina) Ailén Oliva			1	1
90	(Argentina) Nicolas Oliva			1	1
90	(Canada) Clarence Chau			1	1
90	(Canada) Eyota Kwan			1	1
90	(Denmark) Mikkel Klinggaard			1	1
90	(Denmark) Nicoline Tang			1	1
90	(Estonia) Mikk Õunmaa			1	1
90	(Estonia) Ramona Üprus			1	1
90	(France) Louis Lefevre			1	1
90	(France) Carla Martinez			1	1
90	(Germany) Simon Krax			1	1
90	(Germany) Stine Küspert			1	1
90	(Germany) Amelie Lehmann			1	1
90	(Germany) Jan Colin Völker			1	1
90	(Kazakhstan) Dmitriy Panarin			1	1
90	(Kazakhstan) Nargiza Rakhmetullayeva			1	1
90	(Malaysia) Ashraf Zakaria			1	1
90	(Malaysia) Lim Xuan			1	1
90	(Mexico) Maximiliano Peregrina			1	1
90	(Netherlands) Andy Buijk			1	1
90	(Netherlands) Meerte Loos			1	1
90	(Peru) Sharum Durand			1	1
90	(Peru) Namie Miyahira			1	1
90	(Saudi Arabia) Amer Mohammed			1	1
90	(Saudi Arabia) Nabiha Shariff			1	1
90	(Serbia) Andrija Doder			1	1
90	(Serbia) Sara Lončar			1	1
90	(Serbia) Mihajlo Tomić			1	1
90	(Serbia) Andjela Vitman			1	1
90	(Slovenia) Miha Ivančič			1	1
90	(Slovenia) Petra Polanc			1	1
90	(South Africa) Amy Ackerman			1	1
90	(South Africa) Robert Summers			1	1
90	(Spain) Vicente Gázquez			1	1
90	(Spain) Amaia Torralba			1	1
90	(Sweden) Sofia Strömvall			1	1
90	(Sweden) Max Svensson			1	1
90	(Turkey) Yasemen Bektaş			1	1
90	(Turkey) Emre Sönmez			1	1
90	(United States) Charity Lam			1	1
90	(United States) Ansen Liu			1	1
