= Badminton at the 2023 European Games – Women's singles =

Badminton's women's singles at the 2023 European Games
- Venue: Arena Jaskółka, Tarnów
- Dates: 26 June – 2 July
- Competitors: 32 from 30 nations

Medalists
gold medal	Carolina Marín	Spain
silver medal	Mia Blichfeldt	Denmark
bronze medal	Kirsty Gilmour	Great Britain
bronze medal	Jenjira Stadelmann	Switzerland

The women's singles badminton tournament at the 2023 European Games was played from 26 June to 2 July 2023 in Arena Jaskółka, Tarnów. A total of 32 players competed at the tournament, eight of whom were seeded.

== Competition format ==
The tournament started with a group phase round-robin which eliminated 16 players, followed by a single-elimination knockout stage. For the group stage, the players were divided into eight groups of four. Each group plays a round-robin. The top two player in each group advanced to the knockout rounds. The knockout stage was a four-round single elimination tournament.

== Competition schedule ==
Play will take place between 26 June an 2 July.

GS	Group stage	R16	Round of 16	¼	Quarterfinals	½	Semifinals	F	Final

Events	Mon 26	Tue 27	Wed 28	Thu 29	Fri 30	Sat 1	Sun 2
Women's singles	GS	GS	GS	R16	¼	½	F

== Seeding ==
The following players were seeded:

1. (Spain) Carolina Marín (Gold medalist)
2. (Denmark) Mia Blichfeldt (Silver medalist)
3. (Denmark) Line Kjærsfeldt (Quarter-finals)
4. (Germany) Yvonne Li (Round of 16)
5. (United Kingdom) Kirsty Gilmour (Bronze medalist)
6. (Belgium) Lianne Tan (Quarter-finals)
7. (France) Qi Xuefei (Round of 16)
8. (Estonia) Kristin Kuuba (Quarter-finals)

== Pool Stage ==
=== Group A ===
Pos	Team	Pld	W	L	GF	GA	GD	PF	PA	PD	Qualification
1	Carolina Marín (ESP) [1]	2	2	0	4	1	+3	103	67	+36	Qualification to knock-out stage
2	Jenjira Stadelmann (SUI)	2	1	1	3	2	+1	86	85	+1	Qualification to knock-out stage
3	Ksenia Polikarpova (ISR)	2	0	2	0	4	−4	47	84	−37	
4	Katarína Vargová (SVK)	0	0	0	0	0	0	0	0	0	

Date		Score		Game 1	Game 2	Game 3
26 June	Ksenia Polikarpova (Israel)	~~2–0~~	(Slovakia) Katarína Vargová	~~21–17~~	~~21–17~~	
26 June	Carolina Marín (Spain)	2–1	(Switzerland) Jenjira Stadelmann	21–10	19–21	21–13
27 June	Carolina Marín (Spain)	Retired	(Slovakia) Katarína Vargová	13–2^{r}		
27 June	Ksenia Polikarpova (Israel)	0–2	(Switzerland) Jenjira Stadelmann	10–21	14–21	
28 June	Carolina Marín (Spain)	2–0	(Israel) Ksenia Polikarpova	21–15	21–8	
28 June	Katarína Vargová (Slovakia)	w/o	(Switzerland) Jenjira Stadelmann	0–0	0–0	

=== Group B ===
Pos	Team	Pld	W	L	GF	GA	GD	PF	PA	PD	Qualification
1	Mia Blichfeldt (DEN) [2]	3	3	0	6	0	+6	126	59	+67	Qualification to knock-out stage
2	Kim Schmidt (LUX)	3	2	1	4	4	0	119	132	−13	Qualification to knock-out stage
3	Petra Polanc (SLO)	3	1	2	3	4	−1	111	124	−13	
4	Katrin Neudoit (AUT)	3	0	3	1	6	−5	98	139	−41	

Date		Score		Game 1	Game 2	Game 3
26 June	Mia Blichfeldt (Denmark)	2–0	(Austria) Katrin Neudoit	21–13	21–11	
26 June	Kim Schmidt (Luxembourg)	2–1	(Slovenia) Petra Polanc	11–21	21–6	21–18
27 June	Mia Blichfeldt (Denmark)	2–0	(Slovenia) Petra Polanc	21–13	21–11	
27 June	Kim Schmidt (Luxembourg)	2–1	(Austria) Katrin Neudoit	21–13	13–21	21–11
28 June	Mia Blichfeldt (Denmark)	2–0	(Luxembourg) Kim Schmidt	21–5	21–6	
28 June	Petra Polanc (Slovenia)	2–0	(Austria) Katrin Neudoit	21–17	21–12	

=== Group C ===
Pos	Team	Pld	W	L	GF	GA	GD	PF	PA	PD	Qualification
1	Line Kjærsfeldt (DEN) [3]	2	2	0	4	1	+3	94	52	+42	Qualification to knock-out stage
2	Polina Buhrova (UKR)	2	1	1	3	2	+1	84	88	−4	Qualification to knock-out stage
3	Hristomira Popovska (BUL)	2	0	2	0	4	−4	46	84	−38	
4	Edith Urell (SWE)	0	0	0	0	0	0	0	0	0	

Date		Score		Game 1	Game 2	Game 3
26 June	Hristomira Popovska (Bulgaria)	w/d	(Sweden) Edith Urell	0–0	0–0	
26 June	Line Kjærsfeldt (Denmark)	2–1	(Ukraine) Polina Buhrova	10–21	21–10	21–11
27 June	Hristomira Popovska (Bulgaria)	0–2	(Ukraine) Polina Buhrova	17–21	19–21	
27 June	Line Kjærsfeldt (Denmark)	w/d	(Sweden) Edith Urell	0–0	0–0	
28 June	Line Kjærsfeldt (Denmark)	2–0	(Bulgaria) Hristomira Popovska	21–4	21–6	
28 June	Edith Urell (Sweden)	w/d	(Ukraine) Polina Buhrova	0–0	0–0	

=== Group D ===
Pos	Team	Pld	W	L	GF	GA	GD	PF	PA	PD	Qualification
1	Keisha Fatimah Azzahra (AZE)	3	3	0	6	1	+5	143	118	+25	Qualification to knock-out stage
2	Yvonne Li (GER) [4]	3	2	1	5	2	+3	140	99	+41	Qualification to knock-out stage
3	Samanta Golubickaitė (LTU)	3	1	2	2	5	−3	113	139	−26	
4	Vlada Ginga (MDA)	3	0	3	1	6	−5	99	139	−40	

Date		Score		Game 1	Game 2	Game 3
26 June	Yvonne Li (Germany)	2–0	(Moldova) Vlada Ginga	21–11	21–6	
26 June	Keisha Fatimah Azzahra (Azerbaijan)	2–0	(Lithuania) Samanta Golubickaitė	21–16	21–19	
27 June	Keisha Fatimah Azzahra (Azerbaijan)	2–0	(Moldova) Vlada Ginga	21–10	21–17	
27 June	Yvonne Li (Germany)	2–0	(Lithuania) Samanta Golubickaitė	21–13	21–10	
28 June	Yvonne Li (Germany)	1–2	(Azerbaijan) Keisha Fatimah Azzahra	21–17	18–21	17–21
28 June	Samanta Golubickaitė (Lithuania)	2–1	(Moldova) Vlada Ginga	13–21	21–18	21–16

=== Group E ===
Pos	Team	Pld	W	L	GF	GA	GD	PF	PA	PD	Qualification
1	Kirsty Gilmour (GBR) [5]	3	3	0	6	0	+6	126	63	+63	Qualification to knock-out stage
2	Jaymie Laurens (NED)	3	2	1	4	2	+2	111	111	0	Qualification to knock-out stage
3	Eleni Christodoulou (CYP)	3	1	2	2	4	−2	101	123	−22	
4	Wiktoria Dąbczyńska (POL) (H)	3	0	3	0	6	−6	88	129	−41	

(H) Host

Date		Score		Game 1	Game 2	Game 3
26 June	Wiktoria Dąbczyńska (Poland)	0–2	(Netherlands) Jaymie Laurens	21–23	10–21	
26 June	Kirsty Gilmour (United Kingdom)	2–0	(Cyprus) Eleni Christodoulou	21–11	21–9	
27 June	Kirsty Gilmour (United Kingdom)	2–0	(Netherlands) Jaymie Laurens	21–13	21–9	
27 June	Wiktoria Dąbczyńska (Poland)	0–2	(Cyprus) Eleni Christodoulou	16–21	20–22	
28 June	Kirsty Gilmour (United Kingdom)	2–0	(Poland) Wiktoria Dąbczyńska	21-9	21-12	
28 June	Jaymie Laurens (Netherlands)	2–0	(Cyprus) Eleni Christodoulou	24-22	21-16	

=== Group F ===
Pos	Team	Pld	W	L	GF	GA	GD	PF	PA	PD	Qualification
1	Lianne Tan (BEL) [6]	3	3	0	6	0	+6	126	72	+54	Qualification to knock-out stage
2	Vivien Sándorházi (HUN)	3	2	1	4	3	+1	129	119	+10	Qualification to knock-out stage
3	Nella Nyqvist (FIN)	3	1	2	3	4	−1	109	133	−24	
4	Yasmine Hamza (ITA)	3	0	3	0	6	−6	86	126	−40	

Date		Score		Game 1	Game 2	Game 3
26 June	Lianne Tan (Belgium)	2–0	(Italy) Yasmine Hamza	21–10	21–10	
26 June	Nella Nyqvist (Finland)	1–2	(Hungary) Vivien Sándorházi	21–16	12–21	11–21
27 June	Lianne Tan (Belgium)	2–0	(Hungary) Vivien Sándorházi	21–13	21–16	
27 June	Nella Nyqvist (Finland)	2–0	(Italy) Yasmine Hamza	21–14	21–19	
28 June	Lianne Tan (Belgium)	2–0	(Finland) Nella Nyqvist	21–11	21–12	
28 June	Vivien Sándorházi (Hungary)	2–0	(Italy) Yasmine Hamza	21–15	21–18	

=== Group G ===
Pos	Team	Pld	W	L	GF	GA	GD	PF	PA	PD	Qualification
1	Qi Xuefei (FRA) [7]	3	3	0	6	0	+6	129	91	+38	Qualification to knock-out stage
2	Tereza Švábíková (CZE)	3	2	1	4	2	+2	109	106	+3	Qualification to knock-out stage
3	Rachael Darragh (IRL)	3	1	2	2	5	−3	136	150	−14	
4	Marija Sudimac (SRB)	3	0	3	1	6	−5	114	141	−27	

Date		Score		Game 1	Game 2	Game 3
26 June	Qi Xuefei (France)	2–0	(Serbia) Marija Sudimac	21–17	21–11	
26 June	Rachael Darragh (Republic of Ireland)	0–2	(Czech Republic) Tereza Švábíková	21–23	18–21	
27 June	Qi Xuefei (France)	2–0	(Czech Republic) Tereza Švábíková	21–14	21–9	
27 June	Rachael Darragh (Republic of Ireland)	2–1	(Serbia) Marija Sudimac	13–21	21–19	23–21
28 June	Qi Xuefei (France)	2–0	(Republic of Ireland) Rachael Darragh	21–18	24–22	
28 June	Tereza Švábíková (Czech Republic)	2–0	(Serbia) Marija Sudimac	21–10	21–15	

=== Group H ===
Pos	Team	Pld	W	L	GF	GA	GD	PF	PA	PD	Qualification
1	Neslihan Yiğit (TUR)	3	3	0	6	1	+5	144	78	+66	Qualification to knock-out stage
2	Kristin Kuuba (EST) [8]	3	2	1	5	2	+3	132	110	+22	Qualification to knock-out stage
3	Grammatoula Sotiriou (GRE)	3	1	2	2	4	−2	87	108	−21	
4	Jekaterina Romanova (LAT)	3	0	3	0	6	−6	59	126	−67	

Date		Score		Game 1	Game 2	Game 3
26 June	Grammatoula Sotiriou (Greece)	0–2	(Turkey) Neslihan Yiğit	6–21	10–21	
26 June	Kristin Kuuba (Estonia)	2–0	(Latvia) Jekaterina Romanova	21–9	21–12	
27 June	Kristin Kuuba (Estonia)	1–2	(Turkey) Neslihan Yiğit	21–18	17–21	10–21
27 June	Grammatoula Sotiriou (Greece)	2–0	(Latvia) Jekaterina Romanova	21–13	21–11	
28 June	Kristin Kuuba (Estonia)	2–0	(Greece) Grammatoula Sotiriou	21–13	21–16	
28 June	Neslihan Yiğit (Turkey)	2–0	(Latvia) Jekaterina Romanova	21–6	21–8	

== Knockout stage ==
The 16 surviving players will be drawn in a single elimination tournament, with group winners paired in the round-of-16 with runners up from other groups. There will be no bronze medal match, and both losing semi-finalists will win a bronze medal.

Round of 16
1	Carolina Marín (ESP)	21	21
Kim Schmidt (LUX)	9	12
7	Qi Xuefei (FRA)
8	Kristin Kuuba (EST)	w	/	o
3	Line Kjærsfeldt (DEN)	21	21
4	Yvonne Li (GER)	11	14
5	Kirsty Gilmour (GBR)	17	21	21
Vivien Sándorházi (HUN)	21	17	17
Tereza Švábíková (CZE)	14	8
6	Lianne Tan (BEL)	21	21
Jenjira Stadelmann (SUI)	16	21	21
Keisha Fatimah Azzahra (AZE)	21	12	15
Polina Buhrova (UKR)	9	16
Neslihan Yiğit (TUR)	21	21
Jaymie Laurens (NED)	7	7
2	Mia Blichfeldt (DEN)	21	21

Quarter finals
1	Carolina Marín (ESP)	21	21
8	Kristin Kuuba (EST)	10	10
3	Line Kjærsfeldt (DEN)	21	11	19
5	Kirsty Gilmour (GBR)	16	21	21
6	Lianne Tan (BEL)	12	21	19
Jenjira Stadelmann (SUI)	21	7	21
Neslihan Yiğit (TUR)	18	8
2	Mia Blichfeldt (DEN)	21	21

Semi finals
1	Carolina Marín (ESP)	21	21
5	Kirsty Gilmour (GBR)	13	11
Jenjira Stadelmann (SUI)	15	16
2	Mia Blichfeldt (DEN)	21	21

Gold medal match
1	Carolina Marín (ESP)	21	21
2	Mia Blichfeldt (DEN)	15	14

== See also ==
Badminton at the 2023 European Games – Men's singles
