= Keisha Fatimah Azzahra =

Indonesian-Azerbaijani badminton player (born 2003)

Personal information
- Born: 12 August 2003 (age 23) Pekanbaru, Riau, Indonesia
- Years active: 2018–present
- Height: 1.75 m (5 ft 9 in)

Sport
- Country: Indonesia (2018–2019); Azerbaijan (2022–present)
- Sport: Badminton
- Handedness: Left

Women's singles & doubles
- Highest ranking: 56 (WS, 18 February 2025); 76 (WD with Era Maftuha, 4 July 2023)
- Current ranking: 70 (WS, 13 October 2026)
- BWF profile

Keisha Fatimah Azzahra (Azerbaijani: Keişa Fatimə Zəhra; born 12 August 2003) is an Indonesian-born Azerbaijani badminton player. She became an Azerbaijani naturalized citizen in 2022. She is also the second Azerbaijani badminton player to qualify for the Olympic Games after Ade Resky Dwicahyo.

== Career ==
In her junior days, Keisha competed in the Indonesian junior regional tournaments and reached the semi-finals of the Yogyakarta Regional Junior tournament. In January 2022, she lost in the final of the Indonesian national selection trials.

In late 2022, she started to compete in international tournaments under the Azerbaijan flag. In November 2022, she won the Zambia International by defeating Era Maftuha 21–12, 21–16. In 2023, she reached the Iceland International final but lost to Frederikke Lund 21–16, 19–21, 20–22.

Keisha also competed in the 2023 European Games in both women's singles and doubles. In women's singles, she pulled off an upset by defeating fourth seed Yvonne Li to top her group and advance to the knockout stages. In the round of 16, she lost to Jenjira Stadelmann in three games. In women's doubles, she partnered with Era Maftuha but did not get past the group stages. She also won the Cameroon International in August 2023.

In 2024, Keisha competed in the women's singles event at the 2024 Summer Olympics. In Group N, she faced He Bingjiao of China and Kirsty Gilmour of Great Britain. She lost her first match to He Bingjiao 8–21, 7–21. In her second match, she lost to Kirsty Gilmour 13–21, 11–21. She did not advance to the knockout stage.

== Achievements ==
=== BWF International Challenge/Series (7 titles, 3 runners-up) ===
Women's singles
Year	Tournament	Opponent	Score	Result
2022	Zambia International	(Azerbaijan) Era Maftuha	21–12, 21–16	(gold) Winner
2023	Iceland International	(Denmark) Frederikke Lund	21–16, 19–21, 20–22	(silver) Runner-up
2023	Cameroon International	(Israel) Ksenia Polikarpova	21–14, 21–16	(gold) Winner
2024	Turkey International	(Denmark) Amalie Schulz	21–11, 21–9	(gold) Winner
2024	Dutch Open	(Malaysia) Kisona Selvaduray	14–21, 16–21	(silver) Runner-up
2025	Iran Fajr International	(Turkey) Neslihan Arın	17–21, 14–21	(silver) Runner-up
2026	Cameroon International	(United Arab Emirates) Prakriti Bharath	21–16, 21–19	(gold) Winner
2026	Suriname International	(Peru) Inés Castillo	21–19, 20–22, 21–14	(gold) Winner

Women's doubles
Year	Tournament	Partner	Opponent	Score	Result
2022	Zambia International	(Azerbaijan) Era Maftuha	(South Africa) Amy Ackerman (South Africa) Deidre Laurens	21–12, 21–8	(gold) Winner

Mixed doubles
Year	Tournament	Partner	Opponent	Score	Result
2026	Suriname International	(Azerbaijan) Dicky Dwi Pangestu	(Suriname) Sören Opti (Suriname) Crystal Leefmans	21–10, 21–16	(gold) Winner

BWF International Challenge tournament
BWF International Series tournament
BWF Future Series tournament

== Performance timeline ==
Key

W	Won	F	Finalist	SF	Semi-finalist
QF	Quarter-finalist	#R	Rounds 4, 3, 2, 1	RR	Round-robin stage
Q#	Qualification round	A	Absent	w/d	Withdrew
G	Gold	S	Silver	B	Bronze
NH	Not held	N/A	Not applicable	DNQ	Did not qualify

=== National team ===
- Senior level

Team Events	2025
European Mixed Team Championships	RR

=== Individual competitions ===
==== Senior level ====
===== Women's singles =====
Events	2023	2024	2025	2026	Ref
European Championships	NH	1R	2R	2R	
European Games	2R	NH			
World Championships	A	NH	1R	1R	
Olympic Games	NH	RR	NH		

Tournament	BWF World Tour				Best	Ref
Tournament	2023	2024	2025	2026	Best	Ref
Indonesia Masters	A		1R	A	1R ('25)	
German Open	A	1R	A		1R ('24)	
Ruichang China Masters	1R	A			1R ('23)	
Orléans Masters	A	2R	A		2R ('24)	
Thailand Open	A	1R	A		1R ('24)	
Baoji China Masters	NH	A		1R	1R ('26)	
Malaysia Masters	A	Q2	A		Q2 ('24)	
Macau Open	NH	A	Q2	1R	1R ('26)	
Taipei Open	w/d	A			—	
Korea Masters	1R	A	1R	A	1R ('23, '25)	
Indonesia Masters Super 100	A		1R	A	1R ('25)	
Indonesia Masters Super 100	A				1R ('25)	
Vietnam Open	A	2R	A		2R ('24)	
Malaysia Super 100	A		1R	A	1R ('25)	
Hylo Open	1R	2R	QF	1R	QF ('25)	
Japan Masters	A		1R	A	1R ('25)	
Kaohsiung Masters	1R	A			1R ('23)	
Syed Modi International	A	1R	A		1R ('24)	
Guwahati Masters	A	1R	A		1R ('24)	
Year-end ranking	67	68	73		56	
Tournament	2023	2024	2025	2026	Best	Ref

===== Women's doubles =====
Events	2023	2024
European Championships	NH	1R
European Games	RR	NH

Tournament	BWF World Tour		Best
Tournament	2023	2024	Best
Ruichang China Masters	1R	A	1R ('23)
Year-end ranking	108		76
