= 2018 Dutch Open (badminton) =

Tournament details
- Dates: 9–14 October
- Level: Super 100
- Total prize money: US$75,000
- Venue: Topsportcentrum
- Location: Almere, Netherlands

Champions
- Men's singles: (India) Sourabh Verma
- Women's singles: (Denmark) Mia Blichfeldt
- Men's doubles: (Indonesia) Wahyu Nayaka (Indonesia) Ade Yusuf
- Women's doubles: (Bulgaria) Gabriela Stoeva (Bulgaria) Stefani Stoeva
- Mixed doubles: (England) Marcus Ellis (England) Lauren Smith

The 2018 Dutch Open (officially known as the Yonex Dutch Open 2018 for sponsorship reasons) was a badminton tournament which took place from 9 to 14 October 2018 at Topsportcentrum in Almere, Netherlands, and had a total purse of $75,000.

== Tournament ==
The 2018 Dutch Open was the ninth Super 100 tournament of the 2018 BWF World Tour and also part of the Dutch Open championships, which had been held since 1932. This tournament was organised by Badminton Nederland and sanctioned by the BWF.

=== Venue ===
This international tournament was held at Topsportscentrum in Almere, Flevoland, Netherlands.

=== Point distribution ===
Below is the point distribution table for each phase of the tournament based on the BWF points system for the BWF Tour Super 100 event.

Winner	Runner-up	3/4	5/8	9/16	17/32	33/64	65/128
5,500	4,680	3,850	3,030	2,110	1,290	510	240

=== Prize money ===
The total prize money for this tournament was US$75,000. Distribution of prize money was in accordance with BWF regulations.

Event	Winner	Finals	Semi-finals	Quarter-finals	Last 16
Singles	$5,625	$2,850	$1,087.50	$450	$262.50
Doubles	$5,925	$2,850	$1,050	$543.75	$281.25

== Men's singles ==
=== Seeds ===
1. (Netherlands) Mark Caljouw (semi-finals)
2. (England) Rajiv Ouseph (withdrew)
3. (Denmark) Jan Ø. Jørgensen (withdrew)
4. (Brazil) Ygor Coelho de Oliveira (second round)
5. (France) Lucas Corvée (third round)
6. (Israel) Misha Zilberman (second round)
7. (Spain) Pablo Abián (third round)
8. (India) Parupalli Kashyap (quarter-finals)

=== Finals ===
Semi-finals
1	(Netherlands) Mark Caljouw	18	19
(India) Sourabh Verma	21	21
(France) Toma Junior Popov	21	21	10
(Malaysia) Cheam June Wei	19	23	21

Final
(India) Sourabh Verma	21	21
(Malaysia) Cheam June Wei	19	13

=== Top half ===
==== Section 1 ====
First Round
Q8	(Ukraine) V Atrashchenkov	17	22
(Sweden) J Nilsson	21	24
(Hungary) G Krausz	21	21	21
(Belgium) M Moreels	17	23	14
(France) L Claerbout	21	20	18
(Finland) E Heino	19	22	21
(Ukraine) A Pochtarov	21	12	15
(Malaysia) Soong J V	18	21	21

Second Round
1	(Netherlands) M Caljouw	21	21
(Sweden) J Nilsson	15	10
Q7	(Canada) B. R. Sankeerth	21	21
(Hungary) G Krausz	16	6
7	(Spain) P Abián	21	21
(Finland) E Heino	17	9
(Austria) L Wraber	14	8
(Malaysia) Soong J V	21	21

Third Round
1	(Netherlands) M Caljouw	21	21
Q7	(Canada) B. R. Sankeerth	14	13
7	(Spain) P Abián	6	21	16
(Malaysia) Soong J V	21	19	21

Quarter-finals
1	(Netherlands) M Caljouw	21	21
(Malaysia) Soong J V	12	16

==== Section 2 ====
First Round
(France) T Rouxel	21	21
(Turkey) E Lale	18	16
(Germany) J Persson	14	21	12
(Czech Republic) A Mendrek	21	9	21
Q1	(Denmark) J Bruun	21	17	16
(Sri Lanka) N Karunaratne	11	21	21
(India) S Verma	21	21
(Finland) H Aarnio	16	10

Second Round
4	(Brazil) Y Coelho de Oliveira	16	21	13
(France) T Rouxel	21	17	21
(Turkey) M A Kurt	21	21
(Czech Republic) A Mendrek	17	13
6	(Israel) M Zilberman	14	10
(Sri Lanka) N Karunaratne	21	21
Q5	(Bulgaria) D Yanakiev	15	12
(India) S Verma	21	21

Third Round
(France) T Rouxel	27	21
(Turkey) M A Kurt	25	17
(Sri Lanka) N Karunaratne	9	16
(India) S Verma	21	21

Quarter-finals
(France) T Rouxel	16	21	17
(India) S Verma	21	16	21

=== Bottom half ===
==== Section 3 ====
First Round
(Spain) L E Peñalver	21	21
(Denmark) R Messerschmidt	13	19
Q6	(Belgium) B Abts	15	21	16
Q2	(Finland) J Korhonen	21	16	21
(England) S Parsons	21	18	18
(France) T J Popov	18	21	21
PFQ	(Ukraine) D Zavadsky	13	18
(England) T Penty	21	21

Second Round
(Spain) L E Peñalver	17	20
(Germany) A Roovers	21	22
Q2	(Finland) J Korhonen	16	12
5	(France) L Corvée	21	21
(France) T J Popov	21	21
Q4	(Spain) M Vázquez	11	17
(England) T Penty	21	21
PFQ	(Malaysia) Tan J W	15	18

Third Round
(Germany) A Roovers	21	21
5	(France) L Corvée	17	15
(France) T J Popov	16	21	21
(England) T Penty	21	12	17

Quarter-finals
(Germany) A Roovers	21	11	14
(France) T J Popov	19	21	21

==== Section 4 ====
First Round
(Denmark) V Svendsen	18	23	21
(Croatia) Z Đurkinjak	21	21	11
PFQ	(Sri Lanka) D Karunaratna	19	21	21
(India) K R Rajarajan	21	16	18
(India) S Dey	16	21	21
Q3	(Germany) M Weißkirchen	21	17	6
(Malaysia) Cheam J W	21	21
(Luxembourg) R Mann	13	10

Second Round
(Denmark) V Svendsen	21	21
(Finland) K Koljonen	18	13
PFQ	(Sri Lanka) D Karunaratna	15	21	16
8	(India) Parupalli K	21	18	21
(India) S Dey	15	21	21
(Netherlands) N Fransman	21	18	19
(Malaysia) Cheam J W	21	21
PFQ	(Slovakia) M Dratva	18	18

Third Round
(Denmark) V Svendsen	23	12
8	(India) Parupalli K	25	21
(India) S Dey	9	19
(Malaysia) Cheam J W	21	21

Quarter-finals
8	(India) Parupalli K	19	21	8
(Malaysia) Cheam J W	21	14	21

== Women's singles ==
=== Seeds ===
1. (Denmark) Mia Blichfeldt (champion)
2. (Spain) Beatriz Corrales (first round)
3. (Canada) Rachel Honderich (semi-finals)
4. (Turkey) Neslihan Yiğit (quarter-finals)
5. (England) Chloe Birch (quarter-finals)
6. (Germany) Yvonne Li (withdrew)
7. (Denmark) Mette Poulsen (withdrew)
8. (Switzerland) Sabrina Jaquet (quarter-finals)

=== Finals ===
Semi-finals
1	(Denmark) Mia Blichfeldt	21	21
3	(Canada) Rachel Honderich	12	13
(China) Qi Xuefei	21	21
(Turkey) Aliye Demirbağ	16	13

Final
1	(Denmark) Mia Blichfeldt	21	21
(China) Qi Xuefei	16	18

=== Top half ===
==== Section 1 ====
First Round
1	(Denmark) M Blichfeldt	21	21
(Bulgaria) M Mitsova	17	13
(India) S K P Kudaravalli	11	12
(Germany) F Deprez	21	21
5	(England) C Birch	21	21
(Switzerland) A Huser	13	17
(Mauritius) K Foo Kune	21	21	21
Q1	(Finland) A Mikkelä	23	16	9

Second Round
1	(Denmark) M Blichfeldt	21	21
(Germany) F Deprez	9	14
5	(England) C Birch	21	21
(Mauritius) K Foo Kune	18	11

Quarter-finals
1	(Denmark) M Blichfeldt	21	21
5	(England) C Birch	19	13

==== Section 2 ====
First Round
3	(Canada) R Honderich	21	20	21
(Belgium) L Tan	18	22	14
(Netherlands) S de Visch Eijbergen	19	21	21
(Spain) C Azurmendi	21	15	10
8	(Switzerland) S Jaquet	21	21
(Israel) K Polikarpova	6	17
Q3	(Wales) J Hart	21	20	21
(Germany) L Heim	18	22	18

Second Round
3	(Canada) R Honderich	21	21
(Netherlands) S de Visch Eijbergen	13	15
8	(Switzerland) S Jaquet	21	21
Q3	(Wales) J Hart	18	7

Quarter-finals
3	(Canada) R Honderich	21	24
8	(Switzerland) S Jaquet	15	22

=== Bottom half ===
==== Section 3 ====
First Round
(Netherlands) G Mahulette	21	21
(Turkey) Ö Bayrak	14	17
(China) Qi XF	21	21
PFQ	(India) A Prabhudesai	17	8
(Slovakia) M Repiská	10	13
(India) S U R Chukka	21	21
(India) S Rane	18	9
4	(Turkey) N Yiğit	21	21

Second Round
(Netherlands) G Mahulette	10	13
(China) Qi XF	21	21
(India) S U R Chukka	20	13
4	(Turkey) N Yiğit	22	21

Quarter-finals
(China) Qi XF	19	21	21
4	(Turkey) N Yiğit	21	17	9

==== Section 4 ====
First Round
(Turkey) A Demirbağ	19	21	21
Q2	(India) R Mookerjee	21	15	17
(Denmark) M Skødstrup	21	21
PFQ	(Czech Republic) K Tomalová	12	12
(Ukraine) M Ulitina	21	21
Q4	(Switzerland) R Stern	12	13
(Denmark) J D Jakobsen	21	22
2	(Spain) B Corrales	19	20

Second Round
(Turkey) A Demirbağ	21	21
(Denmark) M Skødstrup	14	18
(Ukraine) M Ulitina	13	18
(Denmark) J D Jakobsen	21	21

Quarter-finals
(Turkey) A Demirbağ	21	21
(Denmark) J D Jakobsen	14	15

== Men's doubles ==
=== Seeds ===
1. (Indonesia) Berry Angriawan / Hardianto (quarter-finals)
2. (Indonesia) Wahyu Nayaka / Ade Yusuf (champions)
3. (England) Marcus Ellis / Chris Langridge (second round)
4. (Germany) Jones Ralfy Jansen / Josche Zurwonne (semi-finals)
5. (Netherlands) Jelle Maas / Robin Tabeling (final)
6. (England) Ben Lane / Sean Vendy (second round)
7. (India) Arjun M.R. / Ramchandran Shlok (quarter-finals)
8. (Netherlands) Jacco Arends / Ruben Jille (quarter-finals)

=== Finals ===
Semi-finals
5	(Netherlands) Jelle Maas (Netherlands) Robin Tabeling	21	21
(Denmark) Mathias Bay-Smidt (Denmark) Lasse Mølhede	18	16
4	(Germany) Jones Ralfy Jansen (Germany) Josche Zurwonne	11	14
2	(Indonesia) Wahyu Nayaka (Indonesia) Ade Yusuf	21	21

Final
5	(Netherlands) Jelle Maas (Netherlands) Robin Tabeling	19	21	11
2	(Indonesia) Wahyu Nayaka (Indonesia) Ade Yusuf	21	17	21

=== Top half ===
==== Section 1 ====
First Round
1	(Indonesia) B Angriawan (Indonesia) Hardianto	22	21	21
(France) C Popov (France) T J Popov	24	18	18
Q2	(Denmark) D Daugaard (Denmark) F Søgaard	21	21
Q1	(Germany) H Graalmann (Germany) P Scheiel	12	11
5	(Netherlands) J Maas (Netherlands) R Tabeling	21	21
(Germany) P Käsbauer (Germany) J C Völker	16	16
(Uzbekistan) A Bakhshullaev (Uzbekistan) A Savatyugin	18	14
(Sri Lanka) D Karunaratna (Sri Lanka) N Karunaratne	21	21

Second Round
1	(Indonesia) B Angriawan (Indonesia) Hardianto	21	21
Q2	(Denmark) D Daugaard (Denmark) F Søgaard	16	13
5	(Netherlands) J Maas (Netherlands) R Tabeling	21	21
(Sri Lanka) D Karunaratna (Sri Lanka) N Karunaratne	17	13

Quarter-finals
1	(Indonesia) B Angriawan (Indonesia) Hardianto	18	20
5	(Netherlands) J Maas (Netherlands) R Tabeling	21	22

==== Section 2 ====
First Round
3	(England) M Ellis (England) C Langridge	21	21
(France) M Briot (France) K Lovang	12	8
(England) M Clare (England) M Roe	14	11
(Denmark) M Bay-Smidt (Denmark) L Mølhede	21	21
6	(England) B Lane (England) S Vendy	19	21	21
(India) A George (India) S Shukla	21	17	18
PFQ	(France) C Allain (France) Y Gaudin	8	12
(France) T Gicquel (France) R Labar	21	21

Second Round
3	(England) M Ellis (England) C Langridge	15	15
(Denmark) M Bay-Smidt (Denmark) L Mølhede	21	21
6	(England) B Lane (England) S Vendy	14	20
(France) T Gicquel (France) R Labar	21	22

Quarter-finals
(Denmark) M Bay-Smidt (Denmark) L Mølhede	21	21
(France) T Gicquel (France) R Labar	11	19

=== Bottom half ===
==== Section 3 ====
First Round
(England) P Briggs (England) G Mairs	21	21
(Czech Republic) J Janáček (Czech Republic) T Švejda	9	14
Q3	(India) T Kona (Malaysia) Lim K W	16	21	15
7	(India) Arjun M.R. (India) R Shlok	21	17	21
(Bulgaria) A Vlaar (Bulgaria) D Yanakiev	21	22	21
(India) V K H Raganatha (India) A Surya	18	24	17
(Scotland) A Dunn (Scotland) A Hall	13	21	16
4	(Germany) J R Jansen (Germany) J Zurwonne	21	17	21

Second Round
(England) P Briggs (England) G Mairs	18	19
7	(India) Arjun M.R. (India) R Shlok	21	21
(Bulgaria) A Vlaar (Bulgaria) D Yanakiev	21	10	19
4	(Germany) J R Jansen (Germany) J Zurwonne	19	21	21

Quarter-finals
7	(India) Arjun M.R. (India) R Shlok	15	14
4	(Germany) J R Jansen (Germany) J Zurwonne	21	21

==== Section 4 ====
First Round
(Denmark) F Colberg (Denmark) J Fischer Nielsen	21	18	20
(Germany) R Beck (Germany) A Heinz	18	21	22
(France) F Delrue (France) W Villeger	13	11
8	(Netherlands) J Arends (Netherlands) R Jille	21	21
(India) R Kapoor (India) S Sharma	21	21
(Germany) D Hess (Germany) J Pistorius	12	16
Q4	(Netherlands) W van der Aar (Netherlands) T van der Lecq	16	17
2	(Indonesia) W Nayaka (Indonesia) A Yusuf	21	21

Second Round
(Germany) R Beck (Germany) A Heinz	16	18
8	(Netherlands) J Arends (Netherlands) R Jille	21	21
(India) R Kapoor (India) S Sharma	21	8	15
2	(Indonesia) W Nayaka (Indonesia) A Yusuf	19	21	21

Quarter-finals
8	(Netherlands) J Arends (Netherlands) R Jille	15	21	20
2	(Indonesia) W Nayaka (Indonesia) A Yusuf	21	15	22

== Women's doubles ==
=== Seeds ===
1. (Bulgaria) Gabriela Stoeva / Stefani Stoeva (champions)
2. (Denmark) Maiken Fruergaard / Sara Thygesen (semi-finals)
3. (Netherlands) Selena Piek / Cheryl Seinen (final)
4. (France) Émilie Lefel / Anne Tran (quarter-finals)
5. (Canada) Rachel Honderich / Kristen Tsai (quarter-finals)
6. (Japan) Nami Matsuyama / Chiharu Shida (quarter-finals)
7. (Malaysia) Lim Chiew Sien / Tan Sueh Jeou (first round)
8. (France) Delphine Delrue / Léa Palermo (first round)

=== Finals ===
Semi-finals
1	(Bulgaria) Gabriela Stoeva (Bulgaria) Stefani Stoeva	21	21
(Denmark) Alexandra Bøje (Denmark) Sara Lundgaard	8	12
3	(Netherlands) Selena Piek (Netherlands) Cheryl Seinen	21	21
2	(Denmark) Maiken Fruergaard (Denmark) Sara Thygesen	17	15

Final
1	(Bulgaria) Gabriela Stoeva (Bulgaria) Stefani Stoeva	21	21
3	(Netherlands) Selena Piek (Netherlands) Cheryl Seinen	17	18

=== Top half ===
==== Section 1 ====
First Round
1	(Bulgaria) G Stoeva (Bulgaria) S Stoeva	21	21
(Hungary) N Bukoviczki (Hungary) D Gonda	10	7
(India) S Ghorpade (India) K. Maneesha	0^{r}
Q4	(Netherlands) M Lugters (Netherlands) A Tirtosentono	1
5	(Canada) R Honderich (Canada) K Tsai	15	24	21
PFQ	(India) R Panda (India) A S Sunil	21	22	16
(India) A Balan (India) Sruthi K.P	17	21	15
Q2	(England) J Moore (England) J Pugh	21	15	21

Second Round
1	(Bulgaria) G Stoeva (Bulgaria) S Stoeva	21	21
Q4	(Netherlands) M Lugters (Netherlands) A Tirtosentono	13	8
5	(Canada) R Honderich (Canada) K Tsai	21	21
Q2	(England) J Moore (England) J Pugh	10	11

Quarter-finals
1	(Bulgaria) G Stoeva (Bulgaria) S Stoeva	21	21
5	(Canada) R Honderich (Canada) K Tsai	11	12

==== Section 2 ====
First Round
4	(France) É Lefel (France) A Tran	21	21
(Denmark) A Magelund (Denmark) F Ravn	19	12
(Switzerland) N Fankhauser (Netherlands) I Tabeling	19	18
(Sweden) E Karlsson (Sweden) J Magnussson	21	21
8	(France) D Delrue (France) L Palermo	20	15
(Denmark) A Bøje (Denmark) S Lundgaard	22	21
PFQ	(India) K Garg (India) S Rane	21	21
Q3	(Germany) N Becker (Germany) H Jaenichen	10	3

Second Round
4	(France) É Lefel (France) A Tran	21	21
(Sweden) E Karlsson (Sweden) J Magnussson	8	12
(Denmark) A Bøje (Denmark) S Lundgaard	21	21
PFQ	(India) K Garg (India) S Rane	12	18

Quarter-finals
4	(France) É Lefel (France) A Tran	13	21	19
(Denmark) A Bøje (Denmark) S Lundgaard	21	19	21

=== Bottom half ===
==== Section 3 ====
First Round
(India) H Veludurthi (India) K Wadkar	10	4
(England) C Birch (England) L Smith	21	21
(Germany) L Efler (Germany) I Herttrich	21	21
7	(Malaysia) Lim C S (Malaysia) Tan S J	17	15
(Germany) J Goliszewski (Germany) L Käpplein	21	21
(Belgium) L Jaques (Belgium) F Vandenhoucke	10	15
Q1	(Germany) A Jäger (Germany) S Küspert	17	25	16
3	(Netherlands) S Piek (Netherlands) C Seinen	21	23	21

Second Round
(England) C Birch (England) L Smith	21	23
(Germany) L Efler (Germany) I Herttrich	18	21
(Germany) J Goliszewski (Germany) L Käpplein	20	14
3	(Netherlands) S Piek (Netherlands) C Seinen	22	21

Quarter-finals
(England) C Birch (England) L Smith	19	21	14
3	(Netherlands) S Piek (Netherlands) C Seinen	21	17	21

==== Section 4 ====
First Round
PFQ	(Germany) K Holenz (Germany) A Molitor	7	7
(Germany) E Janssens (Germany) K Ostermeyer	21	21
(Ukraine) M Ilyinskaya (Ukraine) Y Zharka	14	10
6	(Japan) N Matsuyama (Japan) C Shida	21	21
(England) J Hopton (England) V Williams	21	17	17
(Germany) L Kaminski (Germany) H Pohl	12	21	21
(Latvia) I Pope (Latvia) M Radovska	0^{r}
2	(Denmark) M Fruergaard (Denmark) S Thygesen	2

Second Round
(Germany) E Janssens (Germany) K Ostermeyer	16	18
6	(Japan) N Matsuyama (Japan) C Shida	21	21
(Germany) L Kaminski (Germany) H Pohl	13	16
2	(Denmark) M Fruergaard (Denmark) S Thygesen	21	21

Quarter-finals
6	(Japan) N Matsuyama (Japan) C Shida	21	18	15
2	(Denmark) M Fruergaard (Denmark) S Thygesen	17	21	21

== Mixed doubles ==
=== Seeds ===
1. (England) Marcus Ellis / Lauren Smith (champions)
2. (Denmark) Niclas Nøhr / Sara Thygesen (second round)
3. (Netherlands) Jacco Arends / Selena Piek (semi-finals)
4. (England) Ben Lane / Jessica Pugh (quarter-finals)
5. (France) Ronan Labar / Audrey Fontaine (first round)
6. (Denmark) Mikkel Mikkelsen / Mai Surrow (quarter-finals)
7. (Netherlands) Robin Tabeling / Cheryl Seinen (quarter-finals)
8. (India) Rohan Kapoor / Kuhoo Garg (first round)

=== Finals ===
Semi-finals
1	(England) Marcus Ellis (England) Lauren Smith	21	21
3	(Netherlands) Jacco Arends (Netherlands) Selena Piek	12	18
(France) Thom Gicquel (France) Delphine Delrue	21	21
Q4	(Denmark) Mathias Bay-Smidt (Denmark) Rikke Søby	16	6

Final
1	(England) Marcus Ellis (England) Lauren Smith	21	21
(France) Thom Gicquel (France) Delphine Delrue	15	15

=== Top half ===
==== Section 1 ====
First Round
1	(England) M Ellis (England) L Smith	21	21
(Denmark) K Knudsen (Denmark) I Nielsen	14	11
Q2	(Bulgaria) A Vlaar (Bulgaria) M Mitsova	18	11
(France) B Kersaudy (France) A Tran	21	21
5	(France) R Labar (France) A Fontaine	29	17	20
(Netherlands) R Jille (Netherlands) I van der Aar	27	21	22
(India) U Arora (India) K Wadkar	22	20
(England) M Clare (England) V Williams	24	22

Second Round
1	(England) M Ellis (England) L Smith	21	21
(France) B Kersaudy (France) A Tran	16	8
(Netherlands) R Jille (Netherlands) I van der Aar	22	21
(England) M Clare (England) V Williams	20	16

Quarter-finals
1	(England) M Ellis (England) L Smith	21	21
(Netherlands) R Jille (Netherlands) I van der Aar	14	18

==== Section 2 ====
First Round
3	(Netherlands) J Arends (Netherlands) S Piek	21	21
(Germany) J Pistorius (Germany) L Käpplein	6	9
Q1	(France) M Briot (France) S Bauer	23	17	16
(Denmark) M E Christensen (Denmark) C Paredes	21	21	21
6	(Denmark) M Mikkelsen (Denmark) M Surrow	21	21
(Germany) J Zurwonne (Germany) E Janssens	14	15
(Germany) P Käsbauer (Germany) J Goliszewski	21	24	21
PFQ	(India) S Sharma (India) A Balan	18	26	13

Second Round
3	(Netherlands) J Arends (Netherlands) S Piek	21	21
(Denmark) M E Christensen (Denmark) C Paredes	7	11
6	(Denmark) M Mikkelsen (Denmark) M Surrow	23	12	21
(Germany) P Käsbauer (Germany) J Goliszewski	21	21	10

Quarter-finals
3	(Netherlands) J Arends (Netherlands) S Piek	21	9	21
6	(Denmark) M Mikkelsen (Denmark) M Surrow	16	21	14

=== Bottom half ===
==== Section 3 ====
First Round
(India) Arjun M.R. (India) K. Maneesha	12	20
(Denmark) L Molhede (Denmark) S Lundgaard	21	22
(France) T Gicquel (France) D Delrue	21	21
8	(India) R Kapoor (India) K Garg	12	13
(Denmark) J Fischer Nielsen (Denmark) A Bøje	21	21
(England) M Roe (England) J Hopton	13	13
(Ukraine) V Atrashchenkov (Ukraine) Y Zharka	11	16
4	(England) B Lane (England) J Pugh	21	21

Second Round
(Denmark) L Molhede (Denmark) S Lundgaard	14	20
(France) T Gicquel (France) D Delrue	21	22
(Denmark) J Fischer Nielsen (Denmark) A Bøje	18	9
4	(England) B Lane (England) J Pugh	21	21

Quarter-finals
(France) T Gicquel (France) D Delrue	21	21
4	(England) B Lane (England) J Pugh	18	16

==== Section 4 ====
First Round
(Slovakia) M Dratva (Slovakia) M Repiská	13	10
(England) T Wolfenden (England) J Moore	21	21
(Switzerland) O Schaller (Switzerland) C Burkart	9	10
7	(Netherlands) R Tabeling (Netherlands) C Seinen	21	21
Q4	(Denmark) M Bay-Smidt (Denmark) R Søby	16	21	21
(France) G Mittelheisser (France) L Palermo	21	13	18
Q3	(Scotland) A Hall (Scotland) J MacPherson	22	21	15
2	(Denmark) N Nøhr (Denmark) S Thygesen	20	23	21

Second Round
(England) T Wolfenden (England) J Moore	16	16
7	(Netherlands) R Tabeling (Netherlands) C Seinen	21	21
Q4	(Denmark) M Bay-Smidt (Denmark) R Søby	15	24	21
2	(Denmark) N Nøhr (Denmark) S Thygesen	21	22	18

Quarter-finals
7	(Netherlands) R Tabeling (Netherlands) C Seinen	22	14	12
Q4	(Denmark) M Bay-Smidt (Denmark) R Søby	20	21	21

Preceded by 2018 Chinese Taipei Open	BWF World Tour; 2018 BWF season	Succeeded by 2018 Denmark Open
