= Mia Blichfeldt =

Danish badminton player (born 1997)

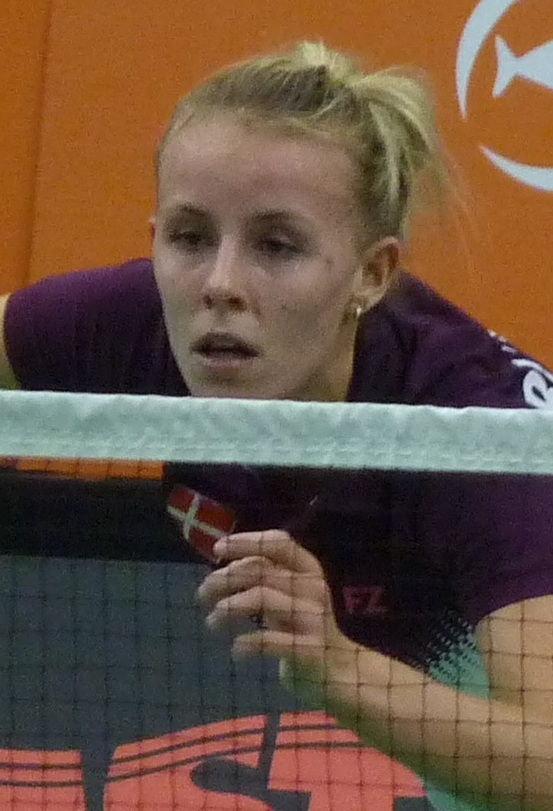
- Blichfeldt at the 2018 Dutch Open

Personal information
- Born: 19 August 1997 (age 29) Solrød Strand, Denmark
- Years active: 2013
- Height: 1.72 m (5 ft 8 in)

Sport
- Country: Denmark
- Sport: Badminton
- Handedness: Right

Women's singles
- Career record: 270 wins, 147 losses
- Highest ranking: 11 (3 September 2019)
- Current ranking: 20 (17 November 2026)
- BWF profile
Medal record
Women's badminton
Representing Denmark
European Games
Gold medal – first place	2019 Minsk	Women's singles
Silver medal – second place	2023 Kraków-Małopolska	Women's singles
European Championships
Bronze medal – third place	2018 Huelva	Women's singles
Bronze medal – third place	2022 Madrid	Women's singles
Bronze medal – third place	2026 Huelva	Women's singles
European Mixed Team Championships
Gold medal – first place	2015 Leuven	Mixed team
Gold medal – first place	2017 Lubin	Mixed team
Gold medal – first place	2019 Copenhagen	Mixed team
Gold medal – first place	2021 Vantaa	Mixed team
Gold medal – first place	2025 Baku	Mixed team
European Women's Team Championships
Gold medal – first place	2014 Basel	Women's team
Gold medal – first place	2016 Kazan	Women's team
Gold medal – first place	2018 Kazan	Women's team
Gold medal – first place	2020 Liévin	Women's team
Gold medal – first place	2024 Łódź	Women's team
Silver medal – second place	2026 Istanbul	Women's team
European Junior Championships
Gold medal – first place	2015 Lubin	Girls' singles
Bronze medal – third place	2015 Lubin	Mixed team

Mia Blichfeldt (born 19 August 1997) is a Danish badminton player. She won the gold medals at the 2015 European Junior Championships in the girls' singles event, and later at the 2019 Minsk European Games in the women's singles event.

== Career summary ==
Blichfeldt started to play badminton at the Solrød Strand badminton club at the age of nine, and began playing competitively at the age of eleven. She made her international debut in 2013, representing her country at the 2013, 2014, 2015 World Junior Championships, and 2014 Summer Youth Olympics. She won the gold medal at the 2015 European Junior Championships in the girls' singles event, also helping her team take the bronze.

At the age of sixteen, she claimed her first international title at the 2013 Norwegian International, beating top seed Olga Golovanova of Russia in the final. In 2014, she won the Danish National Championships.

In 2017, she reached the final of the Scottish Open, but lost in the final to host player Kirsty Gilmour with a score of 21–23, 12–21.

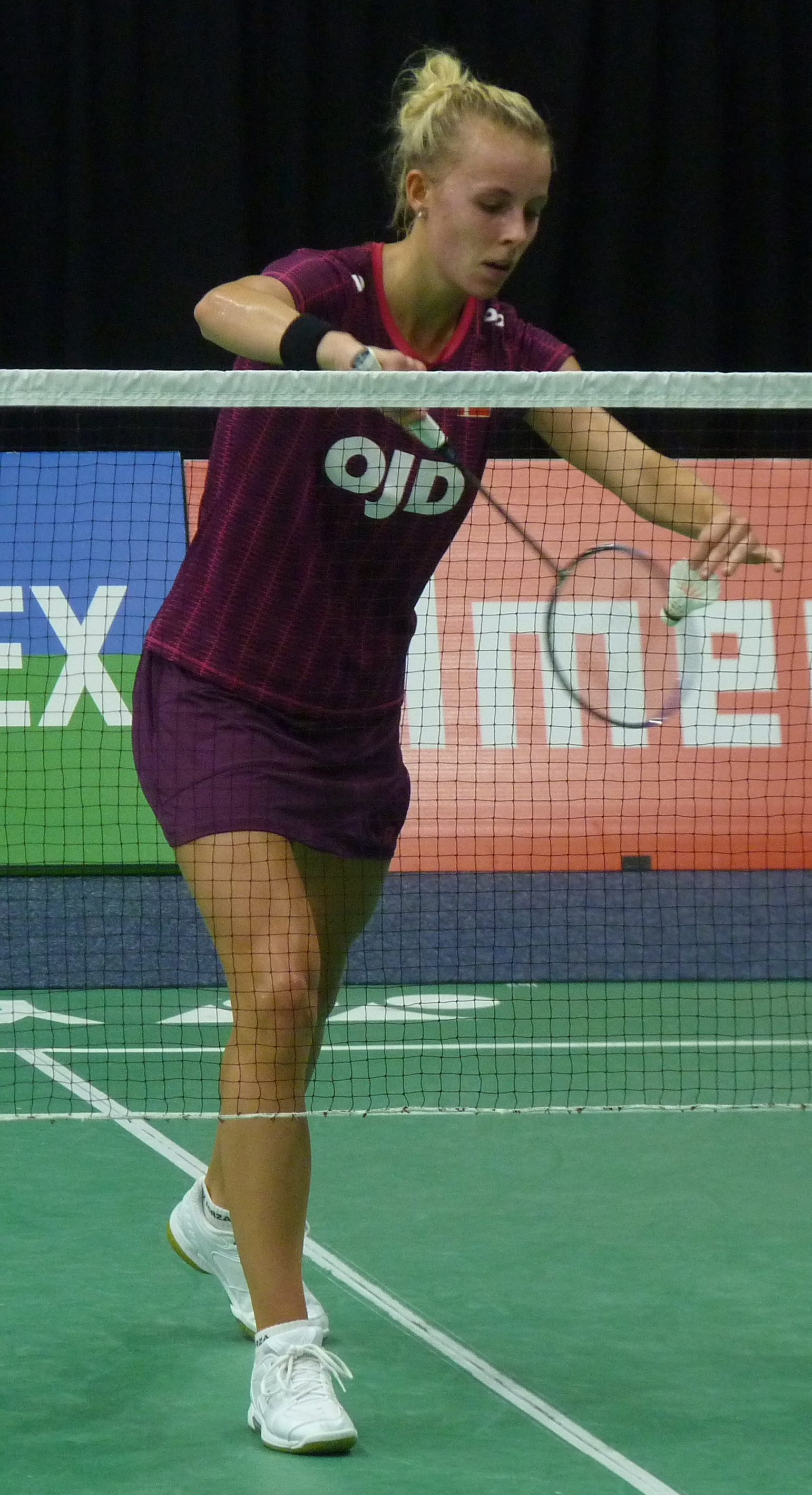
Blichfeldt in 2018

In 2018, Blichfeldt reached the semi-finals of the European Championships, but was stopped by the host player and 2016 Olympic gold medallist Carolina Marín, thus having to settle for a bronze medal. At the same year, she won her first Super 100 title at the Dutch Open, when she defeated Qi Xuefei with a score of 21–16, 21–18.

In 2019, Blichfeldt won the Spain Masters, a Super 300 tournament, by beating compatriot Line Kjærsfeldt with a score of 21–14, 21–14 in the final. She clinched the gold at the 2019 Minsk European Games, defeating Scotland's Kirsty Gilmour with a score of 21–16, 21–17. At the 2019 BWF World Championships, she made her first-ever World Championship quarterfinal by beating eighth seed Saina Nehwal in the Round of 16. However, she lost in the quarterfinals to the Chinese fourth seed and eventual bronze medallist Chen Yufei.

In 2020, Blichfeldt along with the Denmark team won the 2020 European Women's Team Championships.

In 2021, Blichfeldt competed in the 2020 Tokyo Olympics, where she was seeded thirteenth. She topped her group in the Group Stage, beating Bulgaria's Linda Zetchiri and Australia's Chen Hsuan-yu, to make the Round of 16. However, she lost in the Round of 16 to the then reigning World Champion and eventual bronze medallist P. V. Sindhu of India. She also represented Denmark at the 2024 Summer Olympics.

In January 2026, during the India Open, Blichfeldt criticized the condition of the Indira Gandhi Arena in New Delhi.

== Achievements ==
=== European Games ===
Women's singles
Year	Venue	Opponent	Score	Result
2019	Falcon Club; Minsk, Belarus	(United Kingdom) Kirsty Gilmour	21–16, 21–17	Gold
2023	Arena Jaskółka; Tarnów, Poland	(Spain) Carolina Marín	15–21, 14–21	Silver

=== European Championships ===
Women's singles
Year	Venue	Opponent	Score	Result
2018	Palacio de los Deportes Carolina Marín; Huelva, Spain	(Spain) Carolina Marín	17–21, 16–21	Bronze
2022	Polideportivo Municipal Gallur; Madrid, Spain	(Scotland) Kirsty Gilmour	19–21, 21–19, 10–21	Bronze
2026	Palacio de los Deportes Carolina Marín, Huelva, Spain	(Denmark) Line Kjærsfeldt	16–21, 20–22	Bronze

=== European Junior Championships ===
Girls' singles
Year	Venue	Opponent	Score	Result
2015	Regional Sport Centrum Hall; Lubin, Poland	(Denmark) Julie Dawall Jakobsen	21–14, 21–10	Gold

=== BWF World Tour (6 titles, 3 runners-up) ===
The BWF World Tour, which was announced on 19 March 2017 and implemented in 2018, is a series of elite badminton tournaments sanctioned by the Badminton World Federation (BWF). The BWF World Tour is divided into levels of World Tour Finals, Super 1000, Super 750, Super 500, Super 300, and the BWF Tour Super 100.

Women's singles
Year	Tournament	Level	Opponent	Score	Result	Ref.
2018	Orléans Masters	Super 100	(Japan) Shiori Sato	18–21, 14–21	(silver) Runner-up	
2018	Spain Masters	Super 300	(Japan) Minatsu Mitani	21–9, 21–23, 8–21	(silver) Runner-up	
2018	Dutch Open	Super 100	(China) Qi Xuefei	21–16, 21–18	(gold) Winner	
2019	Spain Masters	Super 300	(Denmark) Line Kjærsfeldt	21–14, 21–14	(gold) Winner	
2023	Swiss Open	Super 300	(Thailand) Pornpawee Chochuwong	16–21, 18–21	(silver) Runner-up	
2024	German Open	Super 300	(Vietnam) Nguyễn Thùy Linh	21–11, 21–9	(gold) Winner	
2024	Hylo Open	Super 300	(India) Malvika Bansod	21–10, 21–15	(gold) Winner	
2025	Hylo Open	Super 500	(Indonesia) Putri Kusuma Wardani	21–11, 7–21, 21–12	(gold) Winner	
2026	Arctic Open	Super 500	(Thailand) Ratchanok Intanon	21–17, 21–13	(gold) Winner	

=== BWF Grand Prix (1 runner-up) ===
The BWF Grand Prix had two levels, the BWF Grand Prix and Grand Prix Gold. It was a series of badminton tournaments sanctioned by the Badminton World Federation (BWF) and played from 2007 to 2017.

Women's singles
Year	Tournament	Opponent	Score	Result
2017	Scottish Open	(Scotland) Kirsty Gilmour	21–23, 12–21	(silver) Runner-up

BWF Grand Prix Gold tournament
BWF Grand Prix tournament

=== BWF International Challenge/Series (6 titles, 1 runner-up) ===
Women's singles
Year	Tournament	Opponent	Score	Result
2013	Norwegian International	(Russia) Olga Golovanova	19–21, 21–16, 21–16	(gold) Winner
2014	Norwegian International	(Lithuania) Akvile Stapusaityte	21–18, 21–17	(gold) Winner
2015	Slovenia International	(Ukraine) Marija Ulitina	21–17, 17–21, 12–21	(silver) Runner-up
2016	Portugal International	(England) Chloe Birch	21–12, 21–14	(gold) Winner
2017	Swedish International	(Denmark) Sofie Holmboe Dahl	21–19, 21–16	(gold) Winner
2017	Spanish International	(Russia) Evgeniya Kosetskaya	21–12, 21–12	(gold) Winner
2019	Denmark International	(Japan) Natsuki Oie	21–18, 21–18	(gold) Winner

BWF International Challenge tournament
BWF International Series tournament
BWF Future Series tournament

== Career overview ==
Singles	Played	Wins	Losses	Balance
Total	284	193	91	+102
Current year (2020)	3	3	0	+3

Doubles	Played	Wins	Losses	Balance
Total	2	1	1	0
Current year (2020)	0	0	0	0

== Record against selected opponents ==
Record against Year-end Finals finalists, World Championships semi-finalists, and Olympic quarter-finalists. Accurate as of 6 November 2022.

Players	Matches	Results		Difference
Players	Matches	Won	Lost	Difference
(Bulgaria) Petya Nedelcheva	1	0	1	–1
(China) Chen Yufei	8	1	7	–6
(China) He Bingjiao	4	0	4	–4
(Chinese Taipei) Tai Tzu-ying	3	0	3	–3
(Hong Kong) Yip Pui Yin	2	2	0	+2
(India) Saina Nehwal	2	2	1	+1
(India) P. V. Sindhu	7	1	6	–5

Players	Matches	Results		Difference
Players	Matches	Won	Lost	Difference
(Japan) Minatsu Mitani	2	0	2	–2
(Japan) Nozomi Okuhara	3	0	3	–3
(Japan) Akane Yamaguchi	6	0	6	–6
(South Korea) An Se-young	3	0	3	–3
(South Korea) Sung Ji-hyun	2	0	2	–2
(Spain) Carolina Marín	5	1	4	–3
(Thailand) Ratchanok Intanon	6	0	6	–6
