= Qi Xuefei =

French badminton player (born 1992)

Qi Xuefei 齐雪霏
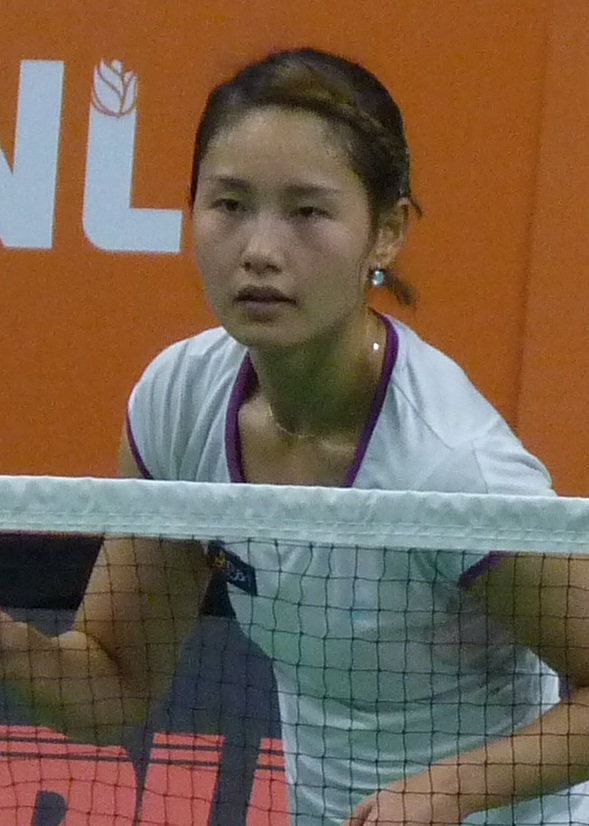
- Qi at the 2018 Dutch Open

Personal information
- Born: 28 February 1992 (age 34) Nanjing, Jiangsu, China

Sport
- Country: China (1992–2018); France (2018–present)
- Sport: Badminton

Women's singles
- Highest ranking: 37 (17 March 2020)
- Current ranking: 53 (16 July 2024)
- BWF profile
Medal record
Women's badminton
Representing France
European Women's Team Championships
Bronze medal – third place	2020 Liévin	Women's team
Bronze medal – third place	2024 Łódź	Women's team
European Mixed Team Championships
Silver medal – second place	2021 Vantaa	Mixed team
Silver medal – second place	2023 Aire-sur-la-Lys	Mixed team
Silver medal – second place	2025 Baku	Mixed team

Qi Xuefei (Chinese: 齐雪霏; born 28 February 1992) is a Chinese-born French badminton player. As a Nanjing native, Qi came to France to play a few Inter-club matches in Rostrenen in 2014. She married her physiotherapist in 2015, and decided to settle in Rostrenen. She obtained her French nationality in 2018, and at the same year, she entered the women's singles team in INSEP. Qi competed at the 2020 Tokyo Summer Olympics.

== Achievements ==
=== BWF World Tour (1 runner-up) ===
The BWF World Tour, which was announced on 19 March 2017 and implemented in 2018, is a series of elite badminton tournaments sanctioned by the Badminton World Federation (BWF). The BWF World Tours are divided into levels of World Tour Finals, Super 1000, Super 750, Super 500, Super 300 (part of the HSBC World Tour), and the BWF Tour Super 100.

Women's singles
Year	Tournament	Level	Opponent	Score	Result
2018	Dutch Open	Super 100	(Denmark) Mia Blichfeldt	16–21, 18–21	(silver) Runner-up

=== BWF International Challenge/Series (6 titles, 2 runners-up) ===
Women's singles
Year	Tournament	Opponent	Score	Result
2017	Slovenian International	(Denmark) Julie Dawall Jakobsen	19–21, 14–21	(silver) Runner-up
2017	Latvia International	(Russia) Olga Arkhangelskaya	21–19, 21–6	(gold) Winner
2017	Belgian International	(Spain) Beatriz Corrales	Withdrew	(silver) Runner-up
2018	Portugal International	(Denmark) Anna Thea Madsen	21–15, 21–17	(gold) Winner
2018	Slovenian International	(Denmark) Michelle Skødstrup	21–15, 21–6	(gold) Winner
2019	Kharkiv International	(Turkey) Neslihan Yiğit	21–18, 19–21, 21–16	(gold) Winner
2019	Irish Open	(Denmark) Julie Dawall Jakobsen	21–15, 21–12	(gold) Winner
2019	Scottish Open	(Chinese Taipei) Sung Shuo-yun	17–21, 22–20, 21–12	(gold) Winner

BWF International Challenge tournament
BWF International Series tournament
BWF Future Series tournament
