= Kirsty Gilmour =

Scottish badminton player (born 1993)

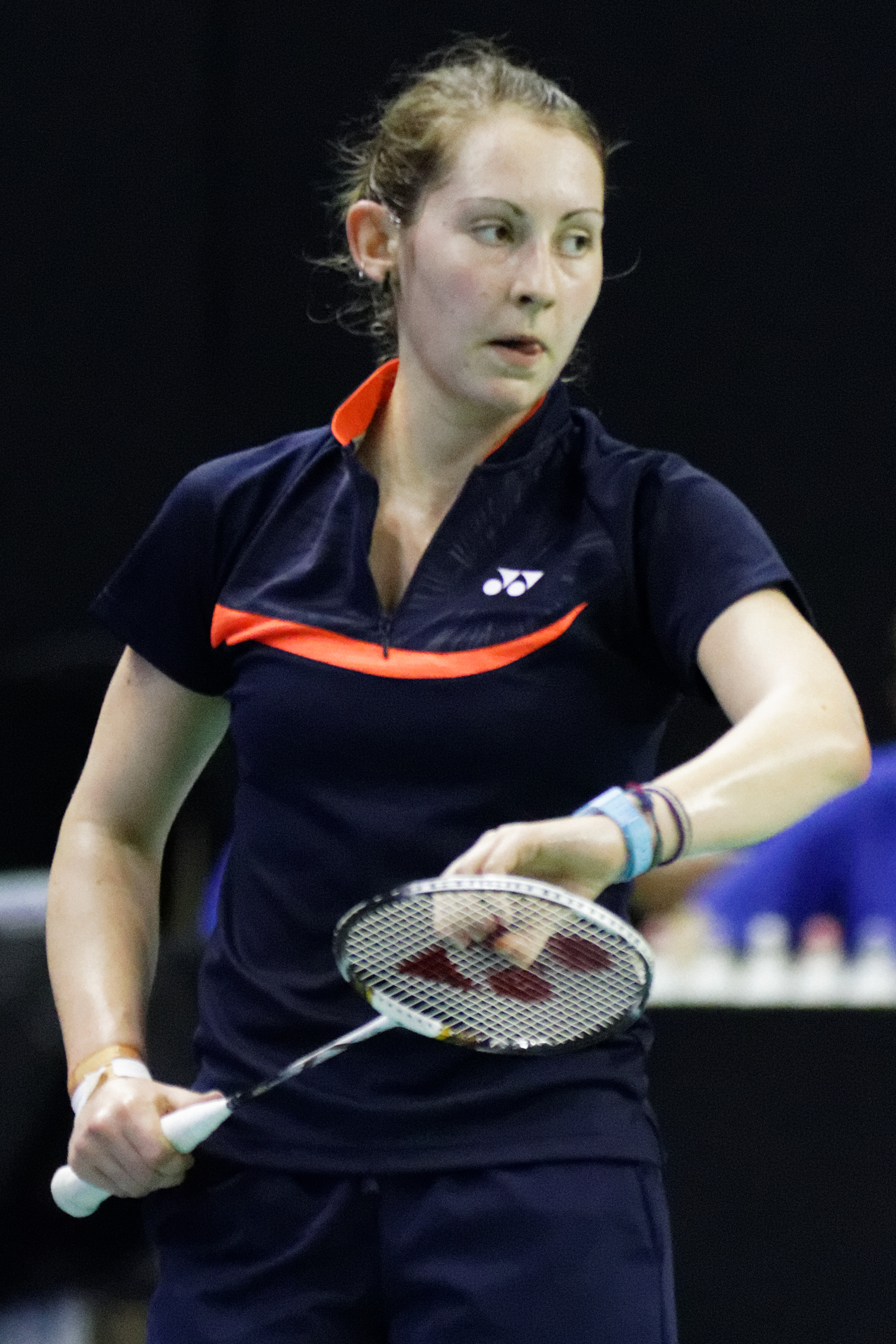
- Gilmour at the 2013 French Open

Personal information
- Born: 21 September 1993 (age 33) Bellshill, Scotland
- Height: 1.68 m (5 ft 6 in)
- Weight: 59 kg (130 lb)

Sport
- Country: Scotland
- Sport: Badminton
- Handedness: Right

Women's singles
- Highest ranking: 14 (29 September 2016)
- Current ranking: 32 (3 November 2026)
- BWF profile
Medal record
Women's badminton
Representing Great Britain
European Games
Silver medal – second place	2019 Minsk	Women's singles
Bronze medal – third place	2023 Kraków–Małopolska	Women's singles
Representing Scotland
Commonwealth Games
Silver medal – second place	2014 Glasgow	Women's singles
Bronze medal – third place	2018 Gold Coast	Women's singles
European Championships
Gold medal – first place	2026 Huelva	Women's singles
Silver medal – second place	2016 La Roche-sur-Yon	Women's singles
Silver medal – second place	2017 Kolding	Women's singles
Silver medal – second place	2022 Madrid	Women's singles
Silver medal – second place	2024 Saarbrücken	Women's singles
Silver medal – second place	2025 Horsens	Women's singles
Bronze medal – third place	2021 Kyiv	Women's singles
European Team Championships
Bronze medal – third place	2020 Liévin	Women's team
Bronze medal – third place	2024 Łódź	Women's team
Commonwealth Youth Games
Bronze medal – third place	2011 Douglas	Girls' singles

Kirsty Gilmour (born 21 September 1993) is a Scottish badminton player who represents both Scotland and Great Britain. She is the first ever European champion in badminton from Scotland.

== Career ==
Gilmour won the silver medal at the 2014 Commonwealth Games, losing out to Michelle Li of Canada in the final and becoming the first Scottish player to reach the women's singles finals at the Commonwealth Games. She jointly won Scottish Young Sports Personality of the Year 2012 with swimmer Craig Benson.

On 1 May 2016, Gilmour went down fighting to Carolina Marín, in the finals of the European Championship held in La Roche-sur-Yon, settling for the silver medal.

Making a second appearance at the Olympics in Rio de Janeiro, Brazil, Gilmour, the eleventh seed, won her opening match against the unseeded Sabrina Jaquet in straight games. However, she lost her second match against the world No. 28 Linda Zetchiri 21–12, 17–21, 16–21, thereby making an exit at the group stage.

In 2017, she made it back into the final round of the European Championship in Kolding, Denmark but her pace was stopped by defending champion Carolina Marín with score 14–21, 12–21. Gilmour earned a silver medal.

Gilmour represented Great Britain at the delayed 2020 Summer Olympics in Tokyo, going out in the group stages after defeating Mahoor Shahzad of Azerbaijan but losing to Japanese fourth seed Akane Yamaguchi.

At the 2024 Summer Olympics in Paris, she again went out in the group stages after winning her opening match against Keisha Fatimah Azzahra from Azerbaijan then losing to China's number six seed He Bingjiao.

== Achievements ==
=== Commonwealth Games ===
Women's singles
Year	Venue	Opponent	Score	Result	Ref.
2014	Emirates Arena, Glasgow, Scotland	(Canada) Michelle Li	14–21, 7–21	Silver	
2018	Carrara Sports and Leisure Centre, Gold Coast, Australia	(Canada) Michelle Li	21–11, 21–16	Bronze	

=== European Games ===
Women's singles
Year	Venue	Opponent	Score	Result
2019	Falcon Club, Minsk, Belarus	(Denmark) Mia Blichfeldt	16–21, 17–21	Silver
2023	Arena Jaskółka, Tarnów, Poland	(Spain) Carolina Marín	13–21, 11–21	Bronze

=== European Championships ===
Women's singles
Year	Venue	Opponent	Score	Result	Ref.
2016	Vendéspace, La Roche-sur-Yon, France	(Spain) Carolina Marín	12–21, 18–21	Silver	
2017	Sydbank Arena, Kolding, Denmark	(Spain) Carolina Marín	14–21, 12–21	Silver	
2021	Palace of Sports, Kyiv, Ukraine	(Denmark) Line Christophersen	13–21, 21–7, 10–21	Bronze	
2022	Polideportivo Municipal Gallur, Madrid, Spain	(Spain) Carolina Marín	10–21, 12–21	Silver	
2024	Saarlandhalle, Saarbrücken, Germany	(Spain) Carolina Marín	11–21, 18–21	Silver	
2025	Forum, Horsens, Denmark	(Denmark) Line Kjærsfeldt	16–21, 17–21	Silver	
2026	Palacio de los Deportes Carolina Marín, Huelva, Spain	(Denmark) Line Kjærsfeldt	21–17, 21–15	Gold	

=== Commonwealth Youth Games ===
Girls' singles
Year	Venue	Opponent	Score	Result	Ref.
2011	National Sports Centre, Douglas, Isle of Man	(Malaysia) Yang Li Lian	21–16, 22–20	Bronze	

=== BWF World Tour (2 titles, 2 runners-up) ===
The BWF World Tour, which was announced on 19 March 2017 and implemented in 2018, is a series of elite badminton tournaments sanctioned by the Badminton World Federation (BWF). The BWF World Tour is divided into levels of World Tour Finals, Super 1000, Super 750, Super 500, Super 300 (part of the HSBC World Tour), and the BWF Tour Super 100.

Women's singles
Year	Tournament	Level	Opponent	Score	Result
2018	Scottish Open	Super 100	(Denmark) Line Kjærsfeldt	21–16, 18–21, 21–18	(gold) Winner
2019	Orléans Masters	Super 100	(Japan) Saena Kawakami	8–21, 21–18, 16–21	(silver) Runner-up
2019	Russian Open	Super 100	(Chinese Taipei) Pai Yu-po	21–9, 19–21, 19–21	(silver) Runner-up
2020	SaarLorLux Open	Super 100	(Germany) Yvonne Li	21–10, 21–17	(gold) Winner

=== BWF Grand Prix (2 titles, 6 runners-up) ===
The BWF Grand Prix had two levels, the Grand Prix and Grand Prix Gold. It was a series of badminton tournaments sanctioned by the Badminton World Federation (BWF) and played between 2007 and 2017.

Women's singles
Year	Tournament	Opponent	Score	Result
2013	London Open	(Spain) Carolina Marín	19–21, 9–21	(silver) Runner-up
2013	Scottish Open	(Spain) Carolina Marín	14–21, 21–11, 13–21	(silver) Runner-up
2015	Dutch Open	(Germany) Karin Schnaase	21–16, 21–13	(gold) Winner
2015	Scottish Open	(Denmark) Line Kjærsfeldt	21–16, 16–21, 18–21	(silver) Runner-up
2015	U.S. Grand Prix	(Chinese Taipei) Pai Yu-po	21–18, 15–21, 15–21	(silver) Runner-up
2016	Malaysia Masters	(India) P. V. Sindhu	15–21, 9–21	(silver) Runner-up
2017	Canada Open	(Japan) Saena Kawakami	21–19, 19–21, 18–21	(silver) Runner-up
2017	Scottish Open	(Denmark) Mia Blichfeldt	23–21, 21–12	(gold) Winner

BWF Grand Prix Gold tournament
BWF Grand Prix tournament

=== BWF International Challenge/Series (12 titles, 6 runners-up) ===
Women's singles
Year	Tournament	Opponent	Score	Result
2012	Polish International	(England) Panuga Riou	21–12, 21–12	(gold) Winner
2012	Czech International	(France) Sashina Vignes Waran	21–18, 10–21, 21–13	(gold) Winner
2012	Swiss International	(Indonesia) Millicent Wiranto	24–22, 21–17	(gold) Winner
2013	Czech International	(Chinese Taipei) Cheng Chi-ya	21–18, 21–10	(gold) Winner
2014	Swedish Masters	(Denmark) Line Kjærsfeldt	24–22, 12–21, 21–10	(gold) Winner
2014	Spanish Open	(Spain) Carolina Marín	21–19, 21–18	(gold) Winner
2015	Swedish Masters	(Spain) Beatriz Corrales	21–18, 21–19	(gold) Winner
2015	Belgian International	(Malaysia) Goh Jin Wei	15–21, 18–21	(silver) Runner-up
2015	Prague Open	(Bulgaria) Linda Zechiri	21–16, 21–14	(gold) Winner
2017	Austrian Open	(Germany) Fabienne Deprez	21–17, 21–9	(gold) Winner
2017	Orleans International	(Malaysia) Lee Ying Ying	22–20, 21–11	(gold) Winner
2019	Spanish International	(Thailand) Phittayaporn Chaiwan	12–21, 15–21	(silver) Runner-up
2025	Scottish Open	(South Korea) Kim Joo-eun	21–15, 17–21, 21–11	(gold) Winner
2026	Belgian International	(Canada) Wen Yu Zhang	21–16, 21–15	(gold) Winner

Women's doubles
Year	Tournament	Partner	Opponent	Score	Result
2012	Czech International	(Scotland) Jillie Cooper	(England) Heather Olver (England) Kate Robertshaw	16–21, 15–21	(silver) Runner-up
2012	Welsh International	(Scotland) Jillie Cooper	(England) Lauren Smith (England) Gabrielle White	7–21, 14–21	(silver) Runner-up
2013	Czech International	(Scotland) Jillie Cooper	(Scotland) Imogen Bankier (Bulgaria) Petya Nedelcheva	6–21, 14–21	(silver) Runner-up
2014	Spanish Open	(Scotland) Imogen Bankier	(Bulgaria) Gabriela Stoeva (Bulgaria) Stefani Stoeva	14–21, 9–21	(silver) Runner-up

BWF International Challenge tournament
BWF International Series tournament
BWF Future Series tournament

== Record against selected opponents ==
Record against Year-end Finals finalists, World Championships semifinalists, and Olympic quarterfinalists. Accurate as of 28 November 2022.

Players	Matches	Results		Difference
Players	Matches	Won	Lost	Difference
(Bulgaria) Petya Nedelcheva	7	4	3	+1
(China) Chen Yufei	1	0	1	–1
(China) He Bingjiao	4	2	2	0
(China) Li Xuerui	1	0	1	–1
(China) Wang Shixian	2	0	2	–2
(China) Wang Yihan	1	0	1	–1
(China) Zhang Yiman	1	1	0	+1
(Chinese Taipei) Tai Tzu-ying	5	0	5	–5
(India) Saina Nehwal	7	0	7	–7
(India) P. V. Sindhu	2	1	1	0

Players	Matches	Results		Difference
Players	Matches	Won	Lost	Difference
(Indonesia) Lindaweni Fanetri	1	1	0	+1
(Japan) Minatsu Mitani	2	0	2	–2
(Japan) Nozomi Okuhara	2	0	2	–2
(Japan) Akane Yamaguchi	4	0	4	–4
(South Korea) An Se-young	5	0	5	–5
(South Korea) Bae Yeon-ju	2	0	2	–2
(South Korea) Sung Ji-hyun	2	0	2	–2
(Spain) Carolina Marín	10	2	8	–6
(Thailand) Porntip Buranaprasertsuk	3	0	3	–3
(Thailand) Ratchanok Intanon	9	1	8	–7

== Personal life ==
Gilmour is currently based in Glasgow. Kirsty Gilmour studied at University of the West of Scotland's Ayr Campus graduating with a BA in Creative Industries Practice in 2015.

Gilmour is openly lesbian and uses she/her and they/them pronouns. She is currently the only openly LGBT badminton player to be ranked in the top 100 of any event and is one of very few openly LGBT professional badminton players.

== See also ==
- Scottish National Badminton Championships
