= Paraguay Open (badminton) =

Badminton tournament in Paraguay

The Paraguay Open or Guaraní Open is an open international badminton tournament held in Paraguay. This tournament organized by the Paraguay Badminton Federation (Federación Paraguaya de Bádminton) and Badminton Pan Am. It was first held in 2025.

== Previous winners ==
Year	Men's singles	Women's singles	Men's doubles	Women's doubles	Mixed doubles
2025	(India) Dhruv Negi	(Peru) Namie Miyahira	(Canada) Clarence Chau (Canada) Wong Yan Kit	(Canada) Eyota Kwan (Canada) Johnna Rymes	(Canada) Clarence Chau (Canada) Eyota Kwan
2026	(Brazil) Donnians Oliveira	(Switzerland) Jenjira Stadelmann	(Brazil) Renan Melo (Brazil) Donnians Oliveira	(Peru) Naomi Junco (Peru) Namie Miyahira	(Brazil) Marcos Ryan Sousa (Brazil) Ana Júlia Ywata

== Performances by nation ==
As of 2026 edition

Pos	Nation	MS	WS	MD	WD	XD	Total
1	Brazil	1		1		1	3
1	Canada			1	1	1	3
3	Peru		1		1		2
4	India	1					1
4	Switzerland		1				1
Total		2	2	2	2	2	10
