= Jenjira Stadelmann =

Swiss badminton player

Personal information
- Born: 20 November 1999 (age 26) Chiang Mai, Thailand
- Height: 1.72 m (5 ft 8 in)

Sport
- Country: Switzerland
- Sport: Badminton
- Handedness: Right
- Coached by: Rajiv Ouseph

Women's singles & doubles
- Highest ranking: 58 (WS 4 July 2023); 61 (WD with Aline Müller 15 November 2022); 295 (XD with Tobias Künzi 16 December 2021)
- BWF profile
Medal record
Women's badminton
Representing Switzerland
European Games
Bronze medal – third place	2023 Kraków–Małopolska	Singles

Jenjira Stadelmann (born 20 November 1999) is a Swiss badminton player. She won the bronze medal at the 2023 European Games in the women's singles event. She won the National Championships title in 2019 and 2023, and claimed her first international title at the 2019 Cyprus International tournament. She was a participant at the 2024 Paris Olympic Games.

== Personal life ==
Stadelmann was born in Chiang Mai, in Northern Thailand in 1999. At the age of 16, she moved to Bern to live with her father. She attended the Appenzellerland sports school in Trogen from 2016 to 2018.

== Achievements ==
=== European Games ===
Women's singles
Year	Venue	Opponent	Score	Result	Ref.
2023	Arena Jaskółka; Tarnów, Poland	(Denmark) Mia Blichfeldt	15–21, 16–21	Bronze	

=== BWF International Challenge/Series (8 titles, 3 runners-up) ===
Women's singles
Year	Tournament	Opponent	Score	Result
2019	Cyprus International	(Hungary) Réka Madarász	21–11, 21–17	(gold) Winner
2019	Slovenia Future Series	(Hungary) Mónika Szőke	21–18, 13–21, 21–15	(gold) Winner
2025	Kampala International	(India) Rujula Ramu	15–12, 9–15, 11–15	(silver) Runner-up
2025	Zambia International	(Italy) Yasmine Hamza	7–7 retired	(silver) Runner-up
2026	Paraguay Open	(Brazil) Juliana Murosaki	21–10, 21–10	(gold) Winner
2026	Perú International	(France) Romane Cloteaux-Foucault	17–21, 21–9, 21–18	(gold) Winner
2026	Dominican International	(Colombia) Juliana Giraldo	21–11, 21–11	(gold) Winner
2026	Senegal International	(Czech Republic) Tereza Švábíková	13–21, 21–11, 8–21	(silver) Runner-up

Women's doubles
Year	Tournament	Partner	Opponent	Score	Result
2025	Kampala International	(Switzerland) Leila Zarrouk	(Malaysia) Lim Xuan (Malaysia) Joanne Ng	15–7, 15–5	(gold) Winner
2025	Uganda International Series	(Switzerland) Leila Zarrouk	(Uganda) Fadilah Mohamed Rafi (Uganda) Tracy Naluwooza	21–13, 21–5	(gold) Winner

Mixed doubles
Year	Tournament	Partner	Opponent	Score	Result
2019	Cyprus International	(Switzerland) Tobias Künzi	(Ukraine) Mykhaylo Makhnovskiy (Ukraine) Anastasiya Prozorova	21–11, 21–14	(gold) Winner

BWF International Challenge tournament
BWF International Series tournament
BWF Future Series tournament

=== BWF Junior International (3 titles) ===
Girls' singles
Year	Tournament	Opponent	Score	Result
2016	Valamar Junior Open	(Hungary) Réka Madarász	21–16, 23–21	(gold) Winner

Girls' doubles
Year	Tournament	Partner	Opponent	Score	Result
2017	Portuguese Junior International	(Switzerland) Aline Müller	(France) Léonice Huet (France) Marion Le Turdu	21–19, 16–21, 21–15	(gold) Winner

Mixed doubles
Year	Tournament	Partner	Opponent	Score	Result
2017	3 Borders Junior International	(Switzerland) Julien Scheiwiller	(France) William Villeger (France) Melanie Potin	21–19, 21–9	(gold) Winner

BWF Junior International Grand Prix tournament
BWF Junior International Challenge tournament
BWF Junior International Series tournament
BWF Junior Future Series tournament
