= 2014 Asian Junior Badminton Championships – Teams event =

Badminton championship in Taipei, Taiwan

Teams event at the 2014 Asian Junior Badminton Championships
- Venue: Taipei Gymnasium
- Location: Taipei, Taiwan
- Dates: 16–19 February 2014

The team tournament at the 2014 Asian Junior Badminton Championships took place from 16 to 19 February 2014 at the Taipei Gymnasium in Taipei, Taiwan. A total of 14 countries competed in this event.

== Group stage ==
=== Group A ===
| Pos | Team | Pld | W | L | MF | MA | MD | GF | GA | GD | PF | PA | PD | Pts | Qualification | Indonesia | Hong Kong | India | Uzbekistan |
|---|---|---|---|---|---|---|---|---|---|---|---|---|---|---|---|---|---|---|---|
| 1 | Indonesia | 3 | 2 | 1 | 11 | 4 | +7 | 25 | 9 | +16 | 682 | 534 | +148 | 2 | Advance to knockout stage | — | 4–1 | 2–3 | 5–0 |
| 2 | Hong Kong | 3 | 2 | 1 | 10 | 5 | +5 | 20 | 12 | +8 | 612 | 516 | +96 | 2 | Advance to knockout stage | | — | 4–1 | 5–0 |
| 3 | India | 3 | 2 | 1 | 9 | 6 | +3 | 21 | 15 | +6 | 696 | 610 | +86 | 2 | | | | — | 5–0 |
| 4 | Uzbekistan | 3 | 0 | 3 | 0 | 15 | −15 | 0 | 30 | −30 | 300 | 630 | −330 | 0 | | | | | — |

Source: BadmintonCN

==== Indonesia vs Uzbekistan ====
Indonesia
5
Taipei Gymnasium, Court 1
16 February 2014, 09:30 UTC+8

Uzbekistan
0

| | | | 1 | 2 | 3 |
|---|---|---|---|---|---|
| 1 | (Indonesia) (Uzbekistan) | Rafiddias Akhdan Nugroho / Zakia Ulfa; Abdurasul Khadjaev / Anait Khurshudyan | 21; 8 | 21; 9 |
| 2 | (Indonesia) (Uzbekistan) | Anthony Sinisuka Ginting; Amrullo Bakhshullaev | 21; 13 | 21; 6 |
| 3 | (Indonesia) (Uzbekistan) | Gregoria Mariska Tunjung; Mariya Pakina | 21; 13 | 21; 11 |
| 4 | (Indonesia) (Uzbekistan) | Reinard Dhanriano / Yantoni Edy Saputra; Amrullo Bakhshullaev / Abdurasul Khadjaev | 21; 12 | 21; 5 |
| 5 | (Indonesia) (Uzbekistan) | Nisak Puji Lestari / Rika Rositawati; Anait Khurshudyan / Mariya Pakina | 21; 2 | 21; 12 |

==== India vs Hong Kong ====
India
1
Taipei Gymnasium, Court 2
16 February 2014, 09:30 UTC+8

Hong Kong
4

| | | | 1 | 2 | 3 |
|---|---|---|---|---|---|
| 1 | (India) (Hong Kong) | M. R. Arjun / Chirag Shetty; Yonny Chung / Yeung Shing Choi | 21; 18 | 19; 21 | 16; 21 |
| 2 | (India) (Hong Kong) | Ruthvika Shivani Gadde; Wu Yi Ting | 21; 10 | 21; 15 |
| 3 | (India) (Hong Kong) | Aditya Joshi; Lee Cheuk Yiu | 18; 21 | 16; 21 |
| 4 | (India) (Hong Kong) | Rituparna Das / Reshma Karthik; Fan Ka Yan / Wu Yi Ting | 21; 16 | 15; 21 | 16; 21 |
| 5 | (India) (Hong Kong) | Chirag Sen / Kuhoo Garg; Yonny Chung / Ng Tsz Yau | 17; 21 | 17; 21 |

==== Indonesia vs Hong Kong ====
Indonesia
4
Taipei Gymnasium, Court 3
16 February 2014, 15:00 UTC+8

Hong Kong
1

| | | | 1 | 2 | 3 |
|---|---|---|---|---|---|
| 1 | (Indonesia) (Hong Kong) | Muhammad Rian Ardianto / Clinton Hendrik; Yonny Chung / Yeung Shing Choi | 21; 16 | 21; 10 |
| 2 | (Indonesia) (Hong Kong) | Ruselli Hartawan; Ng Tsz Yau | 21; 16 | 22; 20 |
| 3 | (Indonesia) (Hong Kong) | Jonatan Christie; Lee Cheuk Yiu | 21; 17 | 21; 16 |
| 4 | (Indonesia) (Hong Kong) | Apriyani Rahayu / Jauza Fadhila Sugiarto; Fan Ka Yan / Wu Yi Ting | 23; 21 | 21; 17 |
| 5 | (Indonesia) (Hong Kong) | Rafiddias Akhdan Nugroho / Nisak Puji Lestari; Yonny Chung / Ng Tsz Yau | 17; 21 | 10; 21 |

==== India vs Uzbekistan ====
India
5
Taipei Gymnasium, Court 4
16 February 2014, 15:00 UTC+0

Uzbekistan
0

| | | | 1 | 2 | 3 |
|---|---|---|---|---|---|
| 1 | (India) (Uzbekistan) | Chirag Sen / Kuhoo Garg; Abdurasul Khadjaev / Anait Khurshudyan | 21; 10 | 21; 10 |
| 2 | (India) (Uzbekistan) | Kaushal Dharmamer; Amrullo Bakhshullaev | 21; 10 | 21; 13 |
| 3 | (India) (Uzbekistan) | Rituparna Das; Mariya Pakina | 21; 11 | 21; 8 |
| 4 | (India) (Uzbekistan) | M. R. Arjun / Rohan Kapoor; Amrullo Bakhshullaev / Abdurasul Khadjaev | 21; 5 | 21; 14 |
| 5 | (India) (Uzbekistan) | Vaishnavi Iyer / Reshma Karthik; Anait Khurshudyan / Mariya Pakina | 21; 14 | 21; 14 |

==== Hong Kong vs Uzbekistan ====
Hong Kong
5
Taipei Gymnasium, Court 5
17 February 2014, 09:30 UTC+8

Uzbekistan
0

| | | | 1 | 2 | 3 |
|---|---|---|---|---|---|
| 1 | (Hong Kong) (Uzbekistan) | Yonny Chung / Ng Tsz Yau; Abdurasul Khadjaev / Anait Khurshudyan | 21; 7 | 21; 9 |
| 2 | (Hong Kong) (Uzbekistan) | Lee Cheuk Yiu; Amrullo Bakhshullaev | 21; 12 | 21; 13 |
| 3 | (Hong Kong) (Uzbekistan) | Ng Tsz Yau; Mariya Pakina | 21; 10 | 21; 8 |
| 4 | (Hong Kong) (Uzbekistan) | Lee Chak Wai / Yeung Shing Choi; Amrullo Bakhshullaev / Abdurasul Khadjaev | 21; 13 | 21; 13 |
| 5 | (Hong Kong) (Uzbekistan) | Fan Ka Yan / Wu Yi Ting; Anait Khurshudyan / Mariya Pakina | 21; 5 | 21; 10 |

==== Indonesia vs India ====
Indonesia
2
Taipei Gymnasium, Court 6
17 February 2014, 09:30 UTC+8

India
3

| | | | 1 | 2 | 3 |
|---|---|---|---|---|---|
| 1 | (Indonesia) (India) | Muhammad Rian Ardianto / Clinton Hendrik; M. R. Arjun / Chirag Shetty | 21; 10 | 15; 21 | 24; 22 |
| 2 | (Indonesia) (India) | Ruselli Hartawan; Ruthvika Shivani Gadde | 16; 21 | 25; 23 | 18; 21 |
| 3 | (Indonesia) (India) | Anthony Sinisuka Ginting; Aditya Joshi | 21; 14 | 19; 21 | 14; 21 |
| 4 | (Indonesia) (India) | Apriyani Rahayu / Rika Rositawati; Rituparna Das / Ruthvika Shivani Gadde | 17; 21 | 21; 16 | 21; 23 |
| 5 | (Indonesia) (India) | Reinard Dhanriano / Nisak Puji Lestari; Chirag Sen / Kuhoo Garg | 21; 19 | 21; 15 |

=== Group B ===
| Pos | Team | Pld | W | L | MF | MA | MD | GF | GA | GD | PF | PA | PD | Pts | Qualification | Chinese Taipei for Olympic games | Thailand | Singapore | Macau |
|---|---|---|---|---|---|---|---|---|---|---|---|---|---|---|---|---|---|---|---|
| 1 | Chinese Taipei (H) | 3 | 3 | 0 | 13 | 2 | +11 | 28 | 7 | +21 | 713 | 473 | +240 | 3 | Advance to knockout stage | — | 4–1 | 4–1 | 5–0 |
| 2 | Thailand | 3 | 2 | 1 | 10 | 5 | +5 | 21 | 12 | +9 | 614 | 494 | +120 | 2 | Advance to knockout stage | | — | 4–1 | 5–0 |
| 3 | Singapore | 3 | 1 | 2 | 7 | 8 | −1 | 17 | 17 | 0 | 599 | 588 | +11 | 1 | | | | — | 5–0 |
| 4 | Macau | 3 | 0 | 3 | 0 | 15 | −15 | 0 | 30 | −30 | 260 | 631 | −371 | 0 | | | | | — |

Source: BadmintonCN
(H) Host

==== Thailand vs Macau ====
Thailand
5
Taipei Gymnasium, Court 3
16 February 2014, 09:30 UTC+8

Macau
0

| | | | 1 | 2 | 3 |
|---|---|---|---|---|---|
| 1 | (Thailand) (Macau) | Dechapol Puavaranukroh / Chanisa Teachavorasinskun; Lou Hok Man / Wong Kit Ieng | 21; 10 | 21; 9 |
| 2 | (Thailand) (Macau) | Kantaphon Wangcharoen; Iek U Ieong | 21; 3 | 21; 7 |
| 3 | (Thailand) (Macau) | Pornpawee Chochuwong; Gong Xue Xin | 21; 9 | 21; 9 |
| 4 | (Thailand) (Macau) | Kittinupong Kedren / Dechapol Puavaranukroh; Jason Lo / Tai Kin Hei | 21; 13 | 21; 12 |
| 5 | (Thailand) (Macau) | Pacharapun Chochuwong / Chanisa Teachavorasinskun; Wong Kit Ieng / Gong Xue Xin | 21; 9 | 21; 4 |

==== Singapore vs Chinese Taipei ====
Singapore
0
Taipei Gymnasium, Court 4
16 February 2014, 09:30 UTC+8

Chinese Taipei
5

| | | | 1 | 2 | 3 |
|---|---|---|---|---|---|
| 1 | (Singapore) (Chinese Taipei) | Ryan Ng / Elaine Chua; Po Li-wei / Chang Ching-hui | 21; 18 | 13; 21 | 23; 21 |
| 2 | (Singapore) (Chinese Taipei) | Bernard Ong; Lai Yu-hua | 9; 21 | 21; 17 | 19; 21 |
| 3 | (Singapore) (Chinese Taipei) | Liang Xiaoyu; Lee Chia hsin | 19; 21 | 10; 21 |
| 4 | (Singapore) (Chinese Taipei) | Bernard Ong / Ryan Ng; Wu Yuan-cheng / Lee Chia-han | 13; 21 | 22; 20 | 24; 26 |
| 5 | (Singapore) (Chinese Taipei) | Elaine Chua / Yeo Jia Min; Chang Ching-hui / Chang Hsin-tien | 8; 21 | 10; 21 |

==== Thailand vs Chinese Taipei ====
Thailand
1
Taipei Gymnasium, Court 5
16 February 2014, 15:00 UTC+8

Chinese Taipei
4

| | | | 1 | 2 | 3 |
|---|---|---|---|---|---|
| 1 | (Thailand) (Chinese Taipei) | Dechapol Puavaranukroh / Pacharapun Chochuwong; Lee Chia-han / Lee Chia-hsin | 16; 21 | 13; 21 |
| 2 | (Thailand) (Chinese Taipei) | Kantaphon Wangcharoen; Lu Chia-hung | 21; 18 | 11; 21 | 5; 21 |
| 3 | (Thailand) (Chinese Taipei) | Kittinupong Kedren / Dechapol Puavaranukroh; Po Li-wei / Yang Ming-tse | 15; 21 | 21; 14 | 21; 12 |
| 4 | (Thailand) (Chinese Taipei) | Pornpawee Chochuwong; Lee Chia-hsin | 18; 21 | 18; 21 |
| 5 | (Thailand) (Chinese Taipei) | Pacharapun Chochuwong / Chanisa Teachavorasinskun; Chang Ching-hui / Chang Hsin-tien | 17; 21 | 15; 21 |

==== Singapore vs Macau ====
Singapore
5
Taipei Gymnasium, Court 6
16 February 2014, 15:00 UTC+8

Macau
0

| | | | 1 | 2 | 3 |
|---|---|---|---|---|---|
| 1 | (Singapore) (Macau) | Ryan Ng / Yeo Jia Min; Tai Kin Hei / Gong Xue Xin | 21; 8 | 21; 7 |
| 2 | (Singapore) (Macau) | Daryl Ng; Jason Lo | 22; 20 | 21; 9 |
| 3 | (Singapore) (Macau) | Yeo Jia Min; Wong Kit Ieng | 21; 9 | 21; 7 |
| 4 | (Singapore) (Macau) | Bernard Ong / Tan Ming Shun; Iek U Ieong / Lou Hok Man | 21; 17 | 21; 13 |
| 5 | (Singapore) (Macau) | Ong Ren-ne / Crystal Wong; Wong Kit Ieng / Gong Xue Xin | 21; 5 | 21; 10 |

==== Chinese Taipei vs Macau ====
Chinese Taipei
5
Taipei Gymnasium, Court 1
17 February 2014, 09:30 UTC+8

Macau
0

| | | | 1 | 2 | 3 |
|---|---|---|---|---|---|
| 1 | (Chinese Taipei) (Macau) | Wu Yuan-cheng / Chang Hsin-tien; Iek U Ieong / Gong Xue Xin | 21; 9 | 21; 3 |
| 2 | (Chinese Taipei) (Macau) | Liu Wei-chi; Lou Hok Man | 21; 9 | 21; 8 |
| 3 | (Chinese Taipei) (Macau) | Sung Shuo-yun; Wong Kit Ieng | 21; 5 | 21; 4 |
| 4 | (Chinese Taipei) (Macau) | Po Li-wei / Yang Ming-tse; Jason Lo / Tai Kin Hei | 21; 12 | 21; 9 |
| 5 | (Chinese Taipei) (Macau) | Pan Tzu-chin / Tsai Hsin-yu; Gong Xue Xin / Wong Kit Ieng | 21; 4 | 21; 7 |

==== Thailand vs Singapore ====
Thailand
4
Taipei Gymnasium, Court 2
17 February 2014, 09:30 UTC+8

Singapore
1

| | | | 1 | 2 | 3 |
|---|---|---|---|---|---|
| 1 | (Thailand) (Singapore) | Pacharapun Chochuwong / Chanisa Teachavorasinskun; Ryan Ng / Yeo Jia Min | 21; 15 | 21; 14 |
| 2 | (Thailand) (Singapore) | Mek Narongrit; Bernard Ong | 16; 21 | 13; 21 |
| 3 | (Thailand) (Singapore) | Pornpawee Chochuwong; Liang Xiaoyu | 16; 21 | 21; 13 | 21; 13 |
| 4 | (Thailand) (Singapore) | Dechapol Puavaranukroh / Kittinupong Kedren; Ryan Ng / Bernard Ong | 21; 13 | 21; 18 |
| 5 | (Thailand) (Singapore) | Pacharapun Chochuwong / Chanisa Teachavorasinskun; Ong Ren-ne / Yeo Jia Min | 21; 12 | 21; 15 |

=== Group C ===
| Pos | Team | Pld | W | L | MF | MA | MD | GF | GA | GD | PF | PA | PD | Pts | Qualification | Japan | South Korea | Philippines |
|---|---|---|---|---|---|---|---|---|---|---|---|---|---|---|---|---|---|---|
| 1 | Japan | 2 | 2 | 0 | 9 | 1 | +8 | 19 | 5 | +14 | 490 | 342 | +148 | 2 | Advance to knockout stage | — | | 5–0 |
| 2 | South Korea | 2 | 1 | 1 | 6 | 4 | +2 | 15 | 9 | +6 | 456 | 406 | +50 | 1 | Advance to knockout stage | 1–4 | — | 5–0 |
| 3 | Philippines | 2 | 0 | 2 | 0 | 10 | −10 | 0 | 20 | −20 | 225 | 423 | −198 | 0 | | | | — |

Source: BadmintonCN

==== South Korea vs Philippines ====
South Korea
5
Taipei Gymnasium, Court 5
16 February 2014, 09:30 UTC+8

Philippines
0

| | | | 1 | 2 | 3 |
|---|---|---|---|---|---|
| 1 | (South Korea) (Philippines) | Kim Jung-ho / Kong Hee-yong; Christian Bernardo / Joella Geva de Vera | 21; 17 | 21; 11 |
| 2 | (South Korea) (Philippines) | Seo Seung-jae; Ros Pedrosa | 21; 11 | 21; 12 |
| 3 | (South Korea) (Philippines) | Kim Jae-hwan / Kim Jung-ho; Joshua Monterubio / Alvin Morada | 21; 12 | 21; 16 |
| 4 | (South Korea) (Philippines) | Kim Ga-eun; Sarah Joy Barredo | 21; 9 | 21; 10 |
| 5 | (South Korea) (Philippines) | Kim Hye-jeong / Kong Hee-yong; Jessie Francisco / Eleanor Inlayo | 21; 6 | 24; 22 |

==== Japan vs Philippines ====
Japan
5
Taipei Gymnasium, Court 1
16 February 2014, 15:00 UTC+8

Philippines
0

| | | | 1 | 2 | 3 |
|---|---|---|---|---|---|
| 1 | (Japan) (Philippines) | Yuta Watanabe / Arisa Higashino; Alvin Morada / Alyssa Leonardo | 21; 9 | 21; 14 |
| 2 | (Japan) (Philippines) | Kanta Tsuneyama; Wilson Joseph Lopez II | 21; 3 | 21; 6 |
| 3 | (Japan) (Philippines) | Masahide Nakata / Katsuki Tamate; Christian Bernardo / Vincent Manuel | 21; 16 | 21; 19 |
| 4 | (Japan) (Philippines) | Aya Ohori; Airah Mae Nicole Albo | 21; 5 | 21; 8 |
| 5 | (Japan) (Philippines) | Wakana Nagahara / Chiharu Shida; Joella Geva de Vera / Alyssa Leonardo | 21; 6 | 21; 13 |

==== South Korea vs Japan ====
South Korea
1
Taipei Gymnasium, Court 3
17 February 2014, 09:30 UTC+8

Japan
4

| | | | 1 | 2 | 3 |
|---|---|---|---|---|---|
| 1 | (South Korea) (Japan) | Kim Jae-hwan / Kim Jung-ho; Masahide Nakata / Katsuki Tamate | 23; 21 | 11; 21 | 21; 17 |
| 2 | (South Korea) (Japan) | Kim Ga-eun; Akane Yamaguchi | 21; 19 | 14; 21 | 14; 21 |
| 3 | (South Korea) (Japan) | Seo Seung-jae; Hashiru Shimono | 21; 17 | 17; 21 | 19; 21 |
| 4 | (South Korea) (Japan) | Bang Ji-sun / Seong Seung-yeon; Wakana Nagahara / Chiharu Shida | 13; 21 | 21; 17 | 15; 21 |
| 5 | (South Korea) (Japan) | Kang Hyung-seok / Kim Hye-jeong; Yuta Watanabe / Arisa Higashino | 16; 21 | 17; 21 |

=== Group D ===
| Pos | Team | Pld | W | L | MF | MA | MD | GF | GA | GD | PF | PA | PD | Pts | Qualification | People's Republic of China | Malaysia | Sri Lanka |
|---|---|---|---|---|---|---|---|---|---|---|---|---|---|---|---|---|---|---|
| 1 | China | 2 | 2 | 0 | 10 | 0 | +10 | 20 | 0 | +20 | 421 | 189 | +232 | 2 | Advance to knockout stage | — | 5–0 | 5–0 |
| 2 | Malaysia | 2 | 1 | 1 | 5 | 5 | 0 | 10 | 10 | 0 | 331 | 319 | +12 | 1 | Advance to knockout stage | | — | 5–0 |
| 3 | Sri Lanka | 2 | 0 | 2 | 0 | 10 | −10 | 0 | 20 | −20 | 176 | 420 | −244 | 0 | | | | — |

Source: BadmintonCN

==== China vs Sri Lanka ====
China
5
Taipei Gymnasium, Court 6
16 February 2014, 09:30 UTC+8

Sri Lanka
0

| | | | 1 | 2 | 3 |
|---|---|---|---|---|---|
| 1 | (China) (Sri Lanka) | He Jiting / Xu Linhan; Pramoddya Heshan Ranaweera / Thisal Yatawara | 21; 13 | 21; 2 |
| 2 | (China) (Sri Lanka) | Qin Jinjing; Kavindika de Silva | 21; 4 | 21; 6 |
| 3 | (China) (Sri Lanka) | Zhao Junpeng; Mahen Anjana Samaranayake | 21; 6 | 21; 7 |
| 4 | (China) (Sri Lanka) | Du Yue / Li Yinhui; Kavindika de Silva / Yasmitha Sankapale Dayarathne | 21; 3 | 21; 8 |
| 5 | (China) (Sri Lanka) | Huang Kaixiang / Chen Qingchen; Thisal Yatawara / Lakhini Sashibhani | 21; 10 | 21; 9 |

==== Malaysia vs Sri Lanka ====
Malaysia
5
Taipei Gymnasium, Court 2
16 February 2014, 15:00 UTC+8

Sri Lanka
0

| | | | 1 | 2 | 3 |
|---|---|---|---|---|---|
| 1 | (Malaysia) (Sri Lanka) | Sim Guo Zheng / Eng Pui Yee; Thisal Yatawara / Yasmitha Sankapale Dayarathne | 21; 11 | 21; 13 |
| 2 | (Malaysia) (Sri Lanka) | Cheam June Wei; Mahen Anjana Samaranayake | 21; 15 | 21; 11 |
| 3 | (Malaysia) (Sri Lanka) | Ho Yen Mei; Kavindika de Silva | 21; 9 | 21; 8 |
| 4 | (Malaysia) (Sri Lanka) | Goh Sze Fei / Tan Jinn Hwa; Pramoddya Heshan Ranaweera / Thisal Yatawara | 21; 6 | 21; 12 |
| 5 | (Malaysia) (Sri Lanka) | Goh Yea Ching / Peck Yen Wei; Kavindika de Silva / Yasmitha Sankapale Dayarathne | 21; 7 | 21; 16 |

==== China vs Malaysia ====
China
5
Taipei Gymnasium, Court 4
17 February 2014, 09:30 UTC+8

Malaysia
0

| | | | 1 | 2 | 3 |
|---|---|---|---|---|---|
| 1 | (China) (Malaysia) | Huang Kaixiang / Chen Qingchen; Sim Guo Zheng / Yap Zhen | 21; 11 | 21; 13 |
| 2 | (China) (Malaysia) | Lin Guipu; Satheishtharan Ramachandran | 21; 8 | 21; 14 |
| 3 | (China) (Malaysia) | Huang Kaixiang / Zheng Siwei; Chua Khek Wei / Chen Jia Huo | 21; 9 | 21; 11 |
| 4 | (China) (Malaysia) | He Bingjiao; Lee Ying Ying | 21; 14 | 22; 20 |
| 5 | (China) (Malaysia) | Chen Qingchen / Jia Yifan; Eng Pui Yee / Tew Jia Jia | 21; 8 | 21; 13 |

== Knockout stage ==
=== Bracket ===
Quarter-finals
18 February
Indonesia | 1
South Korea | 3
18 February
Chinese Taipei | 3
Malaysia | 0
18 February
Hong Kong | 0
Japan | 3
18 February
Thailand | 1
China | 3

Semi-finals
18 February
South Korea | 3
Chinese Taipei | 0
18 February
Japan | 1
China | 3

Final
19 February
South Korea | 0
China | 3

=== Quarter-finals ===
==== Indonesia vs South Korea ====
Indonesia
2
Taipei Gymnasium, Court 1
18 February 2014, 09:30 UTC+8

South Korea
3

| | | | 1 | 2 | 3 |
|---|---|---|---|---|---|---|
| 1 | (Indonesia) (South Korea) | Nisak Puji Lestari / Reinard Dhanriano; Kim Jung-ho / Kim Hye-jeong | 12; 21 | 22; 20 | 13; 21 |
| 2 | (Indonesia) (South Korea) | Jonatan Christie; Seo Seung-jae | 21; 15 | 21; 15 |
| 3 | (Indonesia) (South Korea) | Muhammad Rian Ardianto / Clinton Hendrik; Kim Jae-hwan / Kim Jung-ho | 20; 22 | 16; 21 |
| 4 | (Indonesia) (South Korea) | Fitriani; Kim Ga-eun | 19; 21 | 9; 21 |
| 5 | (Indonesia) (South Korea) | Nisak Puji Lestari / Apriyani Rahayu; Kim Hye-jeong / Kong Hee-yong | | | | not played |

==== Chinese Taipei vs Malaysia ====
Chinese Taipei
3
Taipei Gymnasium, Court 3
18 February 2014, 09:30 UTC+8

Malaysia
2

| | | | 1 | 2 | 3 |
|---|---|---|---|---|---|
| 1 | (Chinese Taipei) (Malaysia) | Lee Chia-han / Lee Chia-hsin; Tan Jinn Hwa / Goh Yea Ching | 18; 21 | 21; 19 | 14; 21 |
| 2 | (Chinese Taipei) (Malaysia) | Lai Yu-hua; Cheam June Wei | 19; 21 | 22; 20 | 21; 16 |
| 3 | (Chinese Taipei) (Malaysia) | Po Li-wei / Yang Ming-tse; Goh Sze Fei / Chen Jia Huo | 17; 21 | 17; 21 |
| 4 | (Chinese Taipei) (Malaysia) | Lee Chia-hsin; Ho Yen Mei | 18; 21 | 22; 20 | 21; 15 |
| 5 | (Chinese Taipei) (Malaysia) | Chang Ching-hui / Chang Hsin-tien; Goh Yea Ching / Peck Yen Wei | 21; 15 | 21; 15 |

==== Hong Kong vs Japan ====
Hong Kong
0
Taipei Gymnasium, Court 2
18 February 2014, 09:30 UTC+8

Japan
3

| | | | 1 | 2 | 3 |
|---|---|---|---|---|---|---|
| 1 | (Hong Kong) (Japan) | Yonny Chung / Ng Tsz Yau; Yuta Watanabe / Arisa Higashino | 8; 21 | 7; 21 |
| 2 | (Hong Kong) (Japan) | Lee Cheuk Yiu; Kanta Tsuneyama | 9; 21 | 16; 21 |
| 3 | (Hong Kong) (Japan) | Yonny Chung / Yeung Shing Choi; Masahide Nakata / Katsuki Tamate | 10; 21 | 20; 22 |
| 4 | (Hong Kong) (Japan) | Yeung Sum Yee; Aya Ohori | | | | not played |
| 5 | (Hong Kong) (Japan) | Ng Tsz Yau / Wu Yi Ting; Wakana Nagahara / Chiharu Shida | | | | not played |

==== Thailand vs China ====
Thailand
1
Taipei Gymnasium, Court 4
18 February 2025, 09:30 UTC+8

China
3

| | | | 1 | 2 | 3 |
|---|---|---|---|---|---|---|
| 1 | (Thailand) (China) | Dechapol Puavaranukroh / Chanisa Teachavorasinskun; Huang Kaixiang / Chen Qingchen | 11; 21 | 15; 21 |
| 2 | (Thailand) (China) | Kantaphon Wangcharoen; Lin Guipu | 9; 21 | 13; 21 |
| 3 | (Thailand) (China) | Kittinupong Kedren / Dechapol Puavaranukroh; Huang Kaixiang / Zheng Siwei | 21; 17 | 14; 21 | 21; 18 |
| 4 | (Thailand) (China) | Pornpawee Chochuwong; He Bingjiao | 17; 21 | 16; 21 |
| 5 | (Thailand) (China) | Pacharapun Chochuwong / Chanisa Teachavorasinskun; Chen Qingchen / Jia Yifan | | | | not played |

=== Semi-finals ===
==== Japan vs China ====
Japan
0
Taipei Gymnasium, Court 2
18 February 2014, 15:00 UTC+8

China
3

| | | | 1 | 2 | 3 |
|---|---|---|---|---|---|---|
| 1 | (Japan) (China) | Yuta Watanabe / Arisa Higashino; Huang Kaixiang / Chen Qingchen | 17; 21 | 21; 19 | 14; 21 |
| 2 | (Japan) (China) | Hashiru Shimono; Lin Guipu | 17; 21 | 9; 21 |
| 3 | (Japan) (China) | Masahide Nakata / Katsuki Tamate; Huang Kaixiang / Zheng Siwei | 15; 21 | 22; 20 | 11; 21 |
| 4 | (Japan) (China) | Akane Yamaguchi; He Bingjiao | | | | not played |
| 5 | (Japan) (China) | Wakana Nagahara / Chiharu Shida; Chen Qingchen / Jia Yifan | | | | not played |

==== South Korea vs Chinese Taipei ====
South Korea
3
Taipei Gymnasium, Court 3
18 February 2014, 15:00 UTC+8

Chinese Taipei
0

| | | | 1 | 2 | 3 |
|---|---|---|---|---|---|---|
| 1 | (South Korea) (Chinese Taipei) | Kim Jung-ho / Kim Hye-jeong; Po Li-wei / Chang Hsin-tien | 21; 13 | 21; 17 |
| 2 | (South Korea) (Chinese Taipei) | Seo Seung-jae; Lu Chia-hung | 21; 15 | 15; 21 | 21; 11 |
| 3 | (South Korea) (Chinese Taipei) | Kim Jae-hwan / Kim Jung-ho; Lee Chia-han / Wu Yuan-cheng | 21; 14 | 26; 24 |
| 4 | (South Korea) (Chinese Taipei) | Kim Ga-eun; Sung Shuo-yun | | | | not played |
| 5 | (South Korea) (Chinese Taipei) | Kim Hye-jeong / Kong Hee-yong; Chang Ching-hui / Chang Hsin-tien | | | | not played |

=== Final ===
==== South Korea vs China ====
South Korea
0
Taipei Gymnasium, Court 1
19 February 2014, 11:00 UTC+8

China
5

| | | | 1 | 2 | 3 |
|---|---|---|---|---|---|---|
| 1 | (South Korea) (China) | Choi Jong-woo / Kim Hyang-im; Huang Kaixiang / Chen Qingchen | 7; 21 | 12; 21 |
| 2 | (South Korea) (China) | Seo Seung-jae; Lin Guipu | 11; 21 | 16; 21 |
| 3 | (South Korea) (China) | Kim Jung-ho / Kim Jae-hwan; Huang Kaixiang / Zheng Siwei | 17; 21 | 19; 21 |
| 4 | (South Korea) (China) | Kim Ga-eun; He Bingjiao | | | | not played |
| 5 | (South Korea) (China) | Kim Hye-jeong / Kong Hee-yong; Chen Qingchen / Jia Yifan | | | | not played |
