= 2019 Badminton Asia Mixed Team Championships =

Tournament details
- Dates: 19–24 March
- Edition: 2
- Venue: Queen Elizabeth Stadium
- Location: Hong Kong

The 2019 Badminton Asia Mixed Team Championships were the second edition of the Badminton Asia Mixed Team Championships which was held at the Queen Elizabeth Stadium in Hong Kong from 19 to 24 March 2019. It was organised by Badminton Asia and Hong Kong Badminton Association. The event was also known as the Tong Yun Kai Cup 2019.

== Medalists ==
Event	Gold	Silver	Bronze
Mixed team	China; Cai Yanyan; Chen Xiaofei; Dong Wenjing; Du Yue; Feng Xueying; Han Chengkai; Han Yue; He Jiting; Li Yinhui; Lu Guangzu; Ou Xuanyi; Tan Qiang; Zhao Junpeng; Zhou Haodong	Japan; Arisa Higashino; Aya Ohori; Ayako Sakuramoto; Ayane Kurihara; Kanta Tsuneyama; Koharu Yonemoto; Kohei Gondo; Minoru Koga; Sayaka Takahashi; Shiho Tanaka; Takuro Hoki; Takuto Inoue; Yugo Kobayashi; Yuki Kaneko; Yukiko Takahata; Yuta Watanabe	Indonesia; Alfian Eko Prasetya; Della Destiara Haris; Fajar Alfian; Fitriani; Frengky Wijaya Putra; Ihsan Maulana Mustofa; Marsheilla Gischa Islami; Muhammad Rian Ardianto; Ni Ketut Mahadewi Istarani; Rizki Amelia Pradipta; Ruselli Hartawan; Sabar Karyaman Gutama; Shesar Hiren Rhustavito; Tania Oktaviani Kusumah; Tontowi Ahmad; Winny Oktavina Kandow
Mixed team	China; Cai Yanyan; Chen Xiaofei; Dong Wenjing; Du Yue; Feng Xueying; Han Chengkai; Han Yue; He Jiting; Li Yinhui; Lu Guangzu; Ou Xuanyi; Tan Qiang; Zhao Junpeng; Zhou Haodong	Japan; Arisa Higashino; Aya Ohori; Ayako Sakuramoto; Ayane Kurihara; Kanta Tsuneyama; Koharu Yonemoto; Kohei Gondo; Minoru Koga; Sayaka Takahashi; Shiho Tanaka; Takuro Hoki; Takuto Inoue; Yugo Kobayashi; Yuki Kaneko; Yukiko Takahata; Yuta Watanabe	Hong Kong; Chang Tak Ching; Chau Hoi Wah; Cheung Ngan Yi; Ho Wai Lun; Lee Cheuk Yiu; Mak Hee Chun; Angus Ng Ka Long; Ng Tsz Yau; Ng Wing Yung; Tam Chun Hei; Tang Chun Man; Tse Ying Suet; Yeung Ming Nok; Yeung Nga Ting; Yip Pui Yin; Yuen Sin Ying

== Tournament ==
The 2019 Badminton Asia Mixed Team Championships officially crowned the best mixed national badminton teams in Asia. 11 teams, lacking two teams from previous edition entered the tournament.

=== Venue ===
The tournament was held at Queen Elizabeth Stadium in Hong Kong.

=== Seeds ===
The seeding were as follows:

1–2	3–4	5–8	9–11
Japan (Group A); China (Group D)	Indonesia; Chinese Taipei	Thailand; India; Malaysia; Hong Kong (host)	Singapore; Sri Lanka; Macau

=== Draw ===
The draw was held at World Trade Centre Club on 28 February 2019. The group stage consisted of one group with two teams and three groups each with three teams. The first seeded team, Japan, was preassigned to Group A, while the second seeded team, China, was preassigned to Group D.

Group A	Group B	Group C	Group D
Japan; Hong Kong	Chinese Taipei; India; Singapore	Indonesia; Thailand; Sri Lanka	China; Malaysia; Macau

== Group stage ==
=== Group A ===
Pos	Team	Pld	W	L	MF	MA	MD	GF	GA	GD	PF	PA	PD	Pts	Qualification
1	Japan	1	1	0	3	2	+1	7	4	+3	228	161	+67	1	Knockout stage
2	Hong Kong (H)	1	0	1	2	3	−1	4	7	−3	161	228	−67	0	Knockout stage

Source: TS
(H) Host
- Japan vs. Hong Kong

Japan
3
Queen Elizabeth Stadium, Court 1
21 March 2019, 19:00 UTC+8

Hong Kong
2

			1	2	3
1	(Japan) (Hong Kong)	Takuto Inoue / Yuki Kaneko; Chang Tak Ching / Yeung Ming Nok	19; 21	23; 25
2	(Japan) (Hong Kong)	Sayaka Takahashi; Cheung Ngan Yi	21; 10	21; 13
3	(Japan) (Hong Kong)	Minoru Koga; Ng Ka Long	16; 21	21; 9	23; 25
4	(Japan) (Hong Kong)	Ayako Sakuramoto / Yukiko Takahata; Ng Tsz Yau / Yuen Sin Ying	21; 10	21; 14
5	(Japan) (Hong Kong)	Yuta Watanabe / Arisa Higashino; Mak Hee Chun / Chau Hoi Wah	21; 10	21; 3

=== Group B ===
Pos	Team	Pld	W	L	MF	MA	MD	GF	GA	GD	PF	PA	PD	Pts	Qualification
1	Chinese Taipei	2	2	0	6	4	+2	16	10	+6	494	451	+43	2	Knockout stage
2	Singapore	2	1	1	5	5	0	12	14	−2	464	469	−5	1	Knockout stage
3	India	2	0	2	4	6	−2	11	15	−4	461	499	−38	0	

Source: TS
- Chinese Taipei vs. Singapore

Chinese Taipei
3
Queen Elizabeth Stadium, Court 1
19 March 2019, 13:00 UTC+8

Singapore
2

			1	2	3
1	(Chinese Taipei) (Singapore)	Liao Min-chun / Su Ching-heng; Loh Kean Hean / Toh Han Zhuo	21; 13	21; 15
2	(Chinese Taipei) (Singapore)	Chen Su-yu; Yeo Jia Min	21; 13	19; 21	8; 21
3	(Chinese Taipei) (Singapore)	Wang Tzu-wei; Loh Kean Yew	21; 15	13; 21	13; 21
4	(Chinese Taipei) (Singapore)	Pai Yu-po / Wu Ti-jung; Citra Putri Sari Dewi / Lim Ming Hui	21; 13	21; 14
5	(Chinese Taipei) (Singapore)	Tseng Min-hao / Hsieh Pei-shan; Danny Bawa Chrisnanta / Tan Wei Han	21; 19	19; 21	21; 12

- India vs. Singapore

India
2
Queen Elizabeth Stadium, Court 1
20 March 2019, 13:00 UTC+8

Singapore
3

			1	2	3
1	(India) (Singapore)	Arjun M.R. / Rutaparna Panda; Danny Bawa Chrisnanta / Tan Wei Han	16; 21	13; 21
2	(India) (Singapore)	Prannoy Kumar; Loh Kean Yew	21; 8	12; 21	21; 17
3	(India) (Singapore)	Arjun M.R. / Ramchandran Shlok; Danny Bawa Chrisnanta / Loh Kean Hean	21; 16	21; 18
4	(India) (Singapore)	Ashmita Chaliha; Yeo Jia Min	21; 17	12; 21	16; 21
5	(India) (Singapore)	Rutaparna Panda / Arathi Sara Sunil; Citra Putri Sari Dewi / Lim Ming Hui	24; 22	15; 21	16; 21

- Chinese Taipei vs. India

Chinese Taipei
3
Queen Elizabeth Stadium, Court 1
21 March 2019, 13:00 UTC+8

India
2

			1	2	3
1	(Chinese Taipei) (India)	Liao Min-chun / Su Ching-heng; Arun George / Sanyam Shukla	17; 21	21; 17	14; 21
2	(Chinese Taipei) (India)	Liang Ting-yu; Ashmita Chaliha	18; 21	21; 17	19; 21
3	(Chinese Taipei) (India)	Wang Tzu-wei; Sourabh Verma	21; 7	16; 21	23; 21
4	(Chinese Taipei) (India)	Chang Ching-hui / Yang Ching-tun; Rutaparna Panda / Arathi Sara Sunil	21; 19	21; 17
5	(Chinese Taipei) (India)	Tseng Min-hao / Hsieh Pei-shan; Ramchandran Shlok / Shikha Gautam	21; 15	21; 14

=== Group C ===
Pos	Team	Pld	W	L	MF	MA	MD	GF	GA	GD	PF	PA	PD	Pts	Qualification
1	Indonesia	2	2	0	9	1	+8	19	3	+16	447	310	+137	2	Knockout stage
2	Thailand	2	1	1	6	4	+2	12	11	+1	414	371	+43	1	Knockout stage
3	Sri Lanka	2	0	2	0	10	−10	3	20	−17	296	476	−180	0	

Source: TS
- Indonesia vs. Sri Lanka

Indonesia
5
Queen Elizabeth Stadium, Court 1
19 March 2019, 19:00 UTC+8

Sri Lanka
0

			1	2	3
1	(Indonesia) (Sri Lanka)	Tontowi Ahmad / Winny Oktavina Kandow; Sachin Dias / Thilini Pramodika Hendahewa	24; 22	21; 15
2	(Indonesia) (Sri Lanka)	Ihsan Maulana Mustofa; Dinuka Karunaratne	21; 9	21; 14
3	(Indonesia) (Sri Lanka)	Sabar Karyaman Gutama / Frengky Wijaya Putra; Sachin Dias / Buwaneka Goonethilleka	21; 8	21; 17
4	(Indonesia) (Sri Lanka)	Fitriani; Dilmi Dias	21; 15	21; 6
5	(Indonesia) (Sri Lanka)	Della Destiara Haris / Rizki Amelia Pradipta; Thilini Pramodika Hendahewa / Kavidi Sirimannage	15; 21	21; 6	21; 11

- Thailand vs. Sri Lanka

Thailand
5
Queen Elizabeth Stadium, Court 1
20 March 2019, 19:00 UTC+8

Sri Lanka
0

			1	2	3
1	(Thailand) (Sri Lanka)	Nipitphon Phuangphuapet / Savitree Amitrapai; Sachin Dias / Thilini Pramodika Hendahewa	21; 10	18; 21	21; 10
2	(Thailand) (Sri Lanka)	Kantaphon Wangcharoen; Dinuka Karunaratne	21; 16	21; 16
3	(Thailand) (Sri Lanka)	Tinn Isriyanet / Tanupat Viriyangkura; Sachin Dias / Buwaneka Goonethilleka	22; 20	19; 21	21; 13
4	(Thailand) (Sri Lanka)	Nitchaon Jindapol; Dilmi Dias	21; 7	21; 3
5	(Thailand) (Sri Lanka)	Jongkolphan Kititharakul / Rawinda Prajongjai; Thilini Pramodika Hendahewa / Kavidi Sirimannage	21; 4	21; 11

- Indonesia vs. Thailand

Indonesia
4
Queen Elizabeth Stadium, Court 2
21 March 2019, 19:00 UTC+8

Thailand
1

			1	2	3
1	(Indonesia) (Thailand)	Fajar Alfian / Muhammad Rian Ardianto; Tinn Isriyanet / Tanupat Viriyangkura	21; 18	21; 14
2	(Indonesia) (Thailand)	Fitriani; Pornpawee Chochuwong	21; 16	17; 21	13; 21
3	(Indonesia) (Thailand)	Shesar Hiren Rhustavito; Suppanyu Avihingsanon	21; 11	21; 15
4	(Indonesia) (Thailand)	Ni Ketut Mahadewi Istarani / Rizki Amelia Pradipta; Jongkolphan Kititharakul / Rawinda Prajongjai	21; 13	21; 11
5	(Indonesia) (Thailand)	Tontowi Ahmad / Winny Oktavina Kandow; Nipitphon Phuangphuapet / Savitree Amitrapai	21; 15	21; 11

=== Group D ===
Pos	Team	Pld	W	L	MF	MA	MD	GF	GA	GD	PF	PA	PD	Pts	Qualification
1	China	2	2	0	8	2	+6	16	4	+12	393	266	+127	2	Knockout stage
2	Malaysia	2	1	1	7	3	+4	14	6	+8	379	283	+96	1	Knockout stage
3	Macau	2	0	2	0	10	−10	0	20	−20	197	420	−223	0	

Source: TS
- China vs. Macau

China
5
Queen Elizabeth Stadium, Court 2
19 March 2019, 19:00 UTC+8

Macau
0

			1	2	3
1	(China) (Macau)	Ou Xuanyi / Feng Xueying; Leong Iok Chong / Ng Weng Chi	21; 8	21; 6
2	(China) (Macau)	Zhao Junpeng; Pui Pang Fong	21; 14	21; 16
3	(China) (Macau)	He Jiting / Tan Qiang; Iek U Ieong / Leong Iok Chong	21; 4	21; 8
4	(China) (Macau)	Cai Yanyan; Pui Chi Wa	21; 12	21; 12
5	(China) (Macau)	Du Yue / Li Yinhui; Kuan Chi Leng / Ng Weng Chi	21; 9	21; 8

- Malaysia vs. Macau

Malaysia
5
Queen Elizabeth Stadium, Court 2
20 March 2019, 19:00 UTC+8

Macau
0

			1	2	3
1	(Malaysia) (Macau)	Low Hang Yee / Ng Eng Cheong; Iek U Ieong / Leong Iok Chong	21; 10	21; 9
2	(Malaysia) (Macau)	Ho Yen Mei; Pui Chi Wa	21; 13	21; 11
3	(Malaysia) (Macau)	Soong Joo Ven; Ao Fei Long	21; 3	21; 8
4	(Malaysia) (Macau)	Anna Cheong Ching Yik / Teoh Mei Xing; Gong Xue Xin / Ng Weng Chi	21; 15	21; 12
5	(Malaysia) (Macau)	Hoo Pang Ron / Cheah Yee See; Pui Pang Fong / Kuan Chi Leng	21; 12	21; 7

- China vs. Malaysia

China
3
Queen Elizabeth Stadium, Court 2
21 March 2019, 13:00 UTC+8

Malaysia
2

			1	2	3
1	(China) (Malaysia)	Han Chengkai / Zhou Haodong; Goh Sze Fei / Nur Izzuddin Mohd Rumsani	21; 15	21; 19
2	(China) (Malaysia)	Han Yue; Lee Ying Ying	21; 17	21; 5
3	(China) (Malaysia)	Lu Guangzu; Cheam June Wei	12; 21	17; 21
4	(China) (Malaysia)	Du Yue / Li Yinhui; Lim Chiew Sien / Pearly Tan Koong Le	21; 11	21; 18
5	(China) (Malaysia)	Ou Xuanyi / Chen Xiaofei; Chen Tang Jie / Peck Yen Wei	13; 21	15; 21

== Knockout stage ==
Quarter-finals
22 March
Japan	3
Malaysia	0
22 March
Indonesia	3
Singapore	0
22 March
Hong Kong	3
Chinese Taipei	2
22 March
Thailand	0
China	3

Semi-finals
23 March
Japan	3
Indonesia	0
23 March
Hong Kong	0
China	3

Final
24 March
Japan	2
China	3

=== Quarterfinals ===
Japan
3
Queen Elizabeth Stadium, Court 1
22 March 2019, 13:00 UTC+8

Malaysia
0

			1	2	3
1	(Japan) (Malaysia)	Takuro Hoki / Yugo Kobayashi; Goh Sze Fei / Nur Izzuddin Mohd Rumsani	19; 21	21; 16	21; 15
2	(Japan) (Malaysia)	Aya Ohori; Ho Yen Mei	21; 9	25; 23
3	(Japan) (Malaysia)	Kanta Tsuneyama; Cheam June Wei	13; 21	23; 21	21; 15
4	(Japan) (Malaysia)	Ayako Sakuramoto / Yukiko Takahata; Lim Chiew Sien / Pearly Tan Koong Le				not played
5	(Japan) (Malaysia)	Yuta Watanabe / Arisa Higashino; Chen Tang Jie / Peck Yen Wei				not played

Indonesia
3
Queen Elizabeth Stadium, Court 2
22 March 2019, 13:00 UTC+8

Singapore
0

			1	2	3
1	(Indonesia) (Singapore)	Fajar Alfian / Muhammad Rian Ardianto; Loh Kean Hean / Toh Han Zhuo	21; 16	19; 21	21; 19
2	(Indonesia) (Singapore)	Ruselli Hartawan; Yeo Jia Min	21; 14	21; 18
3	(Indonesia) (Singapore)	Shesar Hiren Rhustavito; Loh Kean Yew	17; 21	21; 14	21; 7
4	(Indonesia) (Singapore)	Ni Ketut Mahadewi Istarani / Rizki Amelia Pradipta; Lim Ming Hui / Citra Putri Sari Dewi				not played
5	(Indonesia) (Singapore)	Tontowi Ahmad / Winny Oktavina Kandow; Danny Bawa Chrisnanta / Tan Wei Han				not played

Hong Kong
3
Queen Elizabeth Stadium, Court 1
22 March 2019, 19:00 UTC+8

Chinese Taipei
2

			1	2	3
1	(Hong Kong) (Chinese Taipei)	Chang Tak Ching / Yeung Ming Nok; Lu Ching-yao / Yang Po-han	16; 21	21; 23
2	(Hong Kong) (Chinese Taipei)	Cheung Ngan Yi; Liang Ting-yu	11; 21	21; 6	21; 7
3	(Hong Kong) (Chinese Taipei)	Ng Ka Long; Lee Chia-hao	17; 21	21; 14	21; 17
4	(Hong Kong) (Chinese Taipei)	Ng Wing Yung / Yeung Nga Ting; Pai Yu-po / Wu Ti-jung	17; 21	20; 22
5	(Hong Kong) (Chinese Taipei)	Tang Chun Man / Ng Tsz Yau; Tseng Min-hao / Hsieh Pei-shan	22; 20	21; 17

Thailand
0
Queen Elizabeth Stadium, Court 2
22 March 2019, 19:00 UTC+8

China
3

			1	2	3
1	(Thailand) (China)	Nipitphon Phuangphuapet / Savitree Amitrapai; He Jiting / Du Yue	13; 21	13; 21
2	(Thailand) (China)	Kantaphon Wangcharoen; Lu Guangzu	13; 21	19; 21
3	(Thailand) (China)	Tanupat Viriyangkura / Tinn Isriyanet; Han Chengkai / Zhou Haodong	15; 21	13; 21
4	(Thailand) (China)	Pornpawee Chochuwong; Han Yue				not played
5	(Thailand) (China)	Chayanit Chaladchalam / Phataimas Muenwong; Du Yue / Li Yinhui				not played

=== Semifinals ===
Japan
3
Queen Elizabeth Stadium, Court 1
23 March 2019, 13:00 UTC+8

Indonesia
0

			1	2	3
1	(Japan) (Indonesia)	Takuro Hoki / Yugo Kobayashi; Frengky Wijaya Putra / Sabar Karyaman Gutama	21; 11	21; 18
2	(Japan) (Indonesia)	Sayaka Takahashi; Ruselli Hartawan	21; 15	21; 15
3	(Japan) (Indonesia)	Kanta Tsuneyama; Shesar Hiren Rhustavito	15; 21	21; 17	21; 16
4	(Japan) (Indonesia)	Ayako Sakuramoto / Yukiko Takahata; Ni Ketut Mahadewi Istarani / Rizki Amelia Pradipta				not played
5	(Japan) (Indonesia)	Yuta Watanabe / Arisa Higashino; Tontowi Ahmad / Winny Oktavina Kandow				not played

Hong Kong
0
Queen Elizabeth Stadium, Court 1
23 March 2019, 19:00 UTC+8

China
3

			1	2	3
1	(Hong Kong) (China)	Tang Chun Man / Ng Tsz Yau; He Jiting / Du Yue	10; 21	22; 20	14; 21
2	(Hong Kong) (China)	Lee Cheuk Yiu; Lu Guangzu	18; 21	9; 21
3	(Hong Kong) (China)	Chang Tak Ching / Yeung Ming Nok; Han Chengkai / Zhou Haodong	21; 14	18; 21	17; 21
4	(Hong Kong) (China)	Yip Pui Yin; Han Yue				not played
5	(Hong Kong) (China)	Yeung Nga Ting / Ng Tsz Yau; Feng Xueying / Dong Wenjing				not played

=== Final ===
Japan
2
Queen Elizabeth Stadium, Court 1
24 March 2019, 14:00 UTC+8

China
3

			1	2	3
1	(Japan) (China)	Yuta Watanabe / Arisa Higashino; He Jiting / Du Yue	17; 21	17; 21
2	(Japan) (China)	Kanta Tsuneyama; Lu Guangzu	21; 18	21; 7
3	(Japan) (China)	Takuro Hoki / Yugo Kobayashi; Han Chengkai / Zhou Haodong	16; 21	21; 18	21; 13
4	(Japan) (China)	Sayaka Takahashi; Han Yue	21; 17	19; 21	17; 21
5	(Japan) (China)	Ayako Sakuramoto / Yukiko Takahata; Du Yue / Li Yinhui	16; 21	19; 21
