= 2015 Badminton Asia Junior Championships – Boys' singles =

Tournament details
- Dates: 1 – 5 July 2015
- Edition: 18
- Venue: CPB Badminton and Sports Science Training Center
- Location: Bangkok, Thailand

The boys' singles tournament of the 2015 Badminton Asia Junior Championships was held from July 1 to 5. The defending champions of the last edition was Shi Yuqi from China. Firman Abdul Kholik, Cheam June Wei and Kantawat Leelavechabutr were the top 3 seeded this year. Lin Guipu of China emerged as the champion after beat Seo Seung-jae of South Korea in the finals with the score 21–16, 21–11.

== Seeded ==
1. (Indonesia) Firman Abdul Kholik (quarter Finals)
2. (Malaysia) Cheam June Wei (fourth round)
3. (Thailand) Kantawat Leelavechabutr (quarter Finals)
4. (South Korea) Seo Seung-jae (final)
5. (Thailand) Kantaphon Wangcharoen (quarter Finals)
6. (China) Lin Guipu (champion)
7. (Chinese Taipei) Lu Chia-hung (semi Finals)
8. (Malaysia) Satheishtharan Ramachandran (third round)
9. (Indonesia) Vega Vio Nirwanda (quarter Finals)
10. (Singapore) Loh Kean Yew (fourth round)
11. (South Korea) Lee Jun-su (third round)
12. (Indonesia) Panji Ahmad Maulana (fourth round)
13. (Singapore) Ryan Ng Zin Rei (third round)
14. (Thailand) Kittipong Imnark (second round)
15. (Indonesia) Enzi Shafira (second round)
16. (India) Ansal Yadav (third round)

== Draw ==
=== Finals ===
Quarterfinals
1	(Indonesia) Firman Abdul Kholik	21	16
(Japan) Yuta Watanabe	23	21
3	(Thailand) Kantawat Leelavechabutr	13	14
6	(China) Lin Guipu	21	21
5	(Thailand) Kantaphon Wangcharoen	17	15
4	(South Korea) Seo Seung-jae	21	21
7	(Chinese Taipei) Lu Chia-hung	21	21
9	(Indonesia) Vega Vio Nirwanda	15	11

Semifinals
(Japan) Yuta Watanabe	10	12
6	(China) Lin Guipu	21	21
4	(South Korea) Seo Seung-jae	21	21
7	(Chinese Taipei) Lu Chia-hung	14	18

Final
6	(China) Lin Guipu	21	21
4	(South Korea) Seo Seung-jae	16	11

=== Top half ===
==== Section 1 ====
First round
(China) Sun FX	21	21
(Philippines) E Mangubat	6	7

Second round
1	(Indonesia) F Kholik	21	21
(Thailand) M Narongrit	12	13
(Turkmenistan) N Apov	2	10
(Singapore) D Soh	21	21
11	(South Korea) Lee J-s	21	21
(Iran) A Jabbari	10	12
(Sri Lanka) S Rajapakse	7	8
(China) Sun FX	21	21

Third round
1	(Indonesia) F Kholik	21	21
(Singapore) D Soh	11	12
11	(South Korea) Lee J-s	16	19
(China) Sun FX	21	21

Fourth round
1	(Indonesia) F Kholik	22	21
(China) Sun FX	20	11

==== Section 2 ====
First round
(Vietnam) Dang QH	21	21
(Bangladesh) K Opu	13	7

Second round
8	(Malaysia) S Ramachandran	21	21
(Hong Kong) Lam WL	8	10
(Macau) Pui PF	9	11
(Japan) Y Watanabe	21	21
16	(India) A Yadav	21	21
(Nepal) D Nir	10	8
(Chinese Taipei) Chen C-w	21	21
(Vietnam) Dang QH	17	18

Third round
8	(Malaysia) S Ramachandran	23	12
(Japan) Y Watanabe	25	21
16	(India) A Yadav	14	23	9
(Chinese Taipei) Chen C-w	21	21	21

Fourth round
(Japan) Y Watanabe	21	21
(Chinese Taipei) Chen C-w	18	6

==== Section 3 ====
First round
(Macau) Iek UI	21	21
(Pakistan) Z Khalil	12	13

Second round
3	(Thailand) K Leelavechabutr	21	21
(Sri Lanka) M Samaranayake	9	5
(Malaysia) Tan JW	21	21
(Hong Kong) Leung KY	14	17
12	(Indonesia) P Maulana	21	16	21
(Japan) Y Ogura	16	21	19
(Mongolia) G Dashnyam	7	3
(Macau) Iek UI	21	21

Third round
3	(Thailand) K Leelavechabutr	21	21
(Malaysia) Tan JW	14	13
12	(Indonesia) P Maulana	21	21
(Macau) Iek UI	10	5

Fourth round
3	(Thailand) K Leelavechabutr	21	23
12	(Indonesia) P Maulana	18	21

==== Section 4 ====
First round
(Chinese Taipei) Chen C-c	21	21
(Vietnam) Le DP	14	13
(South Korea) Baek S-g	18	21	13
(India) D Farid	21	17	21

Second round
6	(China) Lin GP	21	21
(Kazakhstan) I Yuldashev	6	4
(Philippines) F Gabuelo	12	9
(Chinese Taipei) Chen C-c	21	21
13	(Singapore) R Ng	21	21
(Bangladesh) M Mohammad	7	11
(Thailand) A Namkul	21	21
(India) D Farid	12	13

Third round
6	(China) Lin GP	21	21
(Chinese Taipei) Chen C-c	7	14
13	(Singapore) R Ng	17	9
(Thailand) A Namkul	21	21

Fourth round
6	(China) Lin GP	21	21
(Thailand) A Namkul	7	14

=== Bottom half ===
==== Section 5 ====
First round
(Chinese Taipei) Hsiung S-b	21	21
(Hong Kong) Chan YC	17	19
(Mongolia) D Davaadorj	9	3
(Sri Lanka) D Gunatilleke	21	21

Second round
(Chinese Taipei) Hsiung S-b	16	21	21
(Nepal) D Dhami	21	16	12
(China) Ye BH	21	21
15	(Indonesia) E Shafira	14	14
(Sri Lanka) D Gunatilleke	9	20
(Malaysia) Lee ZJ	21	22
(Japan) K Mitsuhashi	15	19
5	(Thailand) K Wangcharoen	21	21

Third round
(Chinese Taipei) Hsiung S-b	16	11
(China) Ye BH	21	21
(Malaysia) Lee ZJ	14	12
5	(Thailand) K Wangcharoen	21	21

Fourth round
(China) Ye BH	9	21	13
5	(Thailand) K Wangcharoen	21	16	21

==== Section 6 ====
First round
(Bangladesh) M Hossain	5	15
(Vietnam) Nguyen DG	21	21

Second round
(Vietnam) Nguyen DG	21	21
(Kazakhstan) O Yermakov	11	8
(Philippines) A Geverjuan	10	13
10	(Singapore) Loh KY	21	21
(Macau) Lam HH	15	15
(Pakistan) M Tahir	21	21
(India) C Sen	7	12
4	(South Korea) Seo S-j	21	21

Third round
(Vietnam) Nguyen DG	6	11
10	(Singapore) Loh KY	21	21
(Pakistan) M Tahir	3	8
4	(South Korea) Seo S-j	21	21

Fourth round
10	(Singapore) Loh KY	19	14
4	(South Korea) Seo S-j	21	21

==== Section 7 ====
First round
(Bangladesh) T Roy	11	11
(Syria) A Ahmad	21	21

Second round
(Syria) A Ahmad	11	12
(India) S Verma	21	21
(Japan) K Ogawa	22	21
14	(Thailand) K Imnark	20	9
(China) Liu HC	21	21
(Sri Lanka) P Amaranayake	11	9
(South Korea) Son S-h	17	20
7	(Chinese Taipei) Lu C-h	21	22

Third round
(India) S Verma	21	21
(Japan) K Ogawa	19	13
(China) Liu HC	21	19	15
7	(Chinese Taipei) Lu C-h	14	21	21

Fourth round
(India) S Verma	8	14
7	(Chinese Taipei) Lu C-h	21	21

==== Section 8 ====
First round
(Vietnam) Le DN	21	21
(Iran) M Ansari	19	8

Second round
(Vietnam) Le DN	12	8
(Thailand) P Nipornram	21	21
(Hong Kong) Lee CL	21	12	12
9	(Indonesia) V Nirwanda	18	21	21
(Turkmenistan) K Atliyev	4	2
(Singapore) Chuang JL	21	21
(Macau) Lou HM	8	9
2	(Malaysia) Cheam JW	21	21

Third round
(Thailand) P Nipornram	9	23	7
9	(Indonesia) V Nirwanda	21	21	21
(Singapore) Chuang JL	7	8
2	(Malaysia) Cheam JW	21	21

Fourth round
9	(Indonesia) V Nirwanda	20	21	21
2	(Malaysia) Cheam JW	22	12	13
