= 2014 BWF World Junior Championships – Boys singles =

The Boys Singles tournament of the 2014 BWF World Junior Championships was held on April 13–18. Last year winner, Heo Kwang-hee couldn't defend his title due to the age eligibility.

Lin Guipu won the title after beating his fellow countryman Shi Yuqi in the final by 20-22, 21-8, 21-18.

== Seeded ==
1. (Indonesia) Jonatan Christie (quarter-final)
2. (China) Shi Yuqi (final)
3. (Vietnam) Pham Cao Cuong (third round)
4. (China) Zhao Junpeng (semi-final)
5. (Malaysia) Cheam June Wei (quarter-final)
6. (Denmark) Rasmus Gemke (second round)
7. (India) Aditya Joshi (second round)
8. (China) Lin Guipu (champion)
9. (Denmark) Anders Antonsen (third round)
10. (France) Tanguy Citron (third round)
11. (Indonesia) Anthony Ginting (semi-final)
12. (Hong Kong) Lee Cheuk Yiu (third round)
13. (Chinese Taipei) Lu Chia-hung (third round)
14. (Indonesia) Muhammad Bayu Pangisthu (fourth round)
15. (Thailand) Kantaphon Wangcharoen (fourth round)
16. (Germany) Max Weisskirchen (third round)

== Draw ==
=== Finals ===
Quarterfinals
1	(Indonesia) Jonatan Christie	17	18
5/8	(China) Lin Guipu	21	21
3/4	(China) Zhao Junpeng	18	21	21
5/8	(Malaysia) Cheam June Wei	21	12	17
9/16	(Indonesia) Anthony Ginting	21	21
(Japan) Kanta Tsuneyama	13	5
(Malaysia) Satheishtharan Ramachandran	12	7
2	(China) Shi Yuqi	21	21

Semifinals
5/8	(China) Lin Guipu	21	21
3/4	(China) Zhao Junpeng	12	19
9/16	(Indonesia) Anthony Ginting	19	15
2	(China) Shi Yuqi	21	21

Final
5/8	(China) Lin Guipu	20	21	21
2	(China) Shi Yuqi	22	8	18

=== Top Half ===
==== Section 1 ====
First round
(Macau) Iek UI	7	14
(Bulgaria) V Shishkov	21	21
(England) M Clare	21	21
(Armenia) Z Mnatsakanyan	5	9
(Nepal) D Dhami	13	11
(Philippines) R Pedrosa	21	21
(Singapore) B Ong	21	21
(Australia) A Joe	18	14
(Uzbekistan) A Khodjaev	9	7
(United States) J Supandi	21	21

Second round
1	(Indonesia) J Christie	21	21
(Algeria) Y Medel	11	8
(Bulgaria) V Shishkov	21	21
(England) M Clare	17	17
9/16	(Denmark) A Antonsen	21	22
(Philippines) R Pedrosa	17	20
(Singapore) B Ong	21	21
(United States) J Supandi	9	15

Third round
1	(Indonesia) J Christie	21	21
(Bulgaria) V Shishkov	15	11
9/16	(Denmark) A Antonsen	21	18	8
(Singapore) B Ong	17	21	21

Fourth round
1	(Indonesia) J Christie	21	21	21
(Singapore) B Ong	23	9	9

==== Section 2 ====
First round
(Philippines) A Giverjuan	7	7
(Japan) M Koga	21	21
(Bulgaria) D Yanakiev	21	14	11
(Canada) T Lindeman	12	21	21
(England) D King	17	14
(Sri Lanka) B Goonathileka	21	21
(Spain) E Penalver	21	21
(Sri Lanka) M Samaranayake	15	16
(Zambia) C Nakanda	14	7
(India) T Laa	21	21
(Germany) D Peng
(Czech Republic) L Holub	wo

Second round
5/8	(China) Lin GP	21	21
(Japan) M Koga	14	19
(Canada) T Lindeman	13	11
(Sri Lanka) B Goonathileka	21	21
9/16	(Hong Kong) Lee CY	21	23
(Spain) E Penalver	15	21
(India) T Laa	21	21
(Germany) D Peng	19	12

Third round
5/8	(China) Lin GP	21	16	21
(Sri Lanka) B Goonathileka	10	21	15
9/16	(Hong Kong) Lee CY	15	21	21
(India) T Laa	21	11	23

Fourth round
5/8	(China) Lin GP	21	21
(India) T Laa	9	7

==== Section 3 ====
First round
(Slovenia) M Ivanic	19	21	21
(South Africa) M Jennings	21	19	16
(Syria) M Aram	16	21	11
(France) A Hammer	21	16	21
(India) H Dani	21	21
(Netherlands) A Vlaar	10	17
(Serbia) D Petrovic	12	9
(Malaysia) Tan JW	21	21
(Botswana) T Perekisi	16	18
(Egypt) A El Gamal	21	21
(South Korea) Lee J-s	21	21
(Canada) J Lai	12	9

Second round
3/4	(China) Zhao JP	21	21
(Slovenia) M Ivanic	7	9
(France) A Hammer	11	16
(India) H Dani	21	21
9/16	(Chinese Taipei) Lu C-h	21	21
(Malaysia) Tan JW	15	16
(Egypt) A El Gamal	8	10
(South Korea) Lee J-s	21	21

Third round
3/4	(China) Zhao JP	17	21	21
(India) H Dani	21	12	11
9/16	(Chinese Taipei) Lu C-h	21	15	19
(South Korea) Lee J-s	16	21	21

Fourth round
3/4	(China) Zhao JP	17	21	21
(South Korea) Lee J-s	21	19	9

==== Section 4 ====
First round
(Japan) K Kirita	21	21
(Slovenia) Z Laznik	10	13
(South Africa) R Snyman	19	15
(Germany) D Seifert	21	21
(France) R Gueguin	21	21
(Australia) Tang HD	12	16
(Denmark) J Eipe	21	21
(Macau) Lou HM	15	11
(Vietnam) Do TD	15	21	21
(Russia) S Molodov	21	15	11
(Romania) C Filimon	9	2
(Chinese Taipei) Liou W-c	21	21

Second round
5/8	(Malaysia) Cheam JW	21	21
(Japan) K Kirita	15	19
(Germany) D Seifert	12	18
(France) R Gueguin	21	21
9/16	(Thailand) K Wangcharoen	21	21
(Denmark) J Eipe	18	13
(Vietnam) Do TD	12	15
(Chinese Taipei) Liou W-c	21	21

Third round
5/8	(Malaysia) Cheam JW	21	21
(France) R Gueguin	13	11
9/16	(Thailand) K Wangcharoen	25	21
(Chinese Taipei) Liou W-c	23	18

Fourth round
5/8	(Malaysia) Cheam JW	21	21
9/16	(Thailand) K Wangcharoen	13	18

=== Bottom Half ===
==== Section 5 ====
First round
(Russia) D Riabov	21	17	21
(China) Ye BH	14	21	17
(Chinese Taipei) Chang E-c	15	16
(Thailand) K Leelavechabutr	21	21
(Australia) D Guda	21	23
(Philippines) W Lopez II	17	21
(United States) J Ma	6	11
(Chinese Taipei) Lai Y-h	21	21
(Sri Lanka) S Angodavidanalage	21	21
(Zambia) C Mulenga	13	8
(South Korea) Seo S-j	21	21
(Uzbekistan) A Bakhshullaev	12	7

Second round
(Russia) D Riabov	11	17
(Thailand) K Leelavechabutr	21	21
(Australia) D Guda	12	13
9/16	(Indonesia) A Ginting	21	21
(Chinese Taipei) Lai Y-h	21	12	16
(Sri Lanka) S Angodavidanalage	17	21	21
(South Korea) Seo S-j	21	21
5/8	(India) A Joshi	18	9

Third round
(Thailand) K Leelavechabutr	10	16
9/16	(Indonesia) A Ginting	21	21
(Sri Lanka) S Angodavidanalage	5	6
(South Korea) Seo S-j	21	21

Fourth round
9/16	(Indonesia) A Ginting	22	12	21
(South Korea) Seo S-j	20	21	18

==== Section 6 ====
First round
(South Korea) Byun J-s	24	12	20
(Thailand) A Namkul	22	21	22
(Macau) J Lo	18	18
(Vietnam) Vo BT	21	21
(Slovenia) A Krapez	8	11
(Singapore) D Ng	21	21
(Mexico) L Garrido	21	21
(Czech Republic) J Somerlik	11	8
(Mongolia) B Bayarbyamba	1	2
(Japan) K Tsuneyama	21	21
(Singapore) R Ng	21	21
(Turkey) M Kurt	16	19

Second round
(Thailand) A Namkul	21	21
(Vietnam) Vo BT	10	9
(Singapore) D Ng	7	12
9/16	(Germany) M Weisskirchen	21	21
(Mexico) L Garrido	12	9
(Japan) K Tsuneyama	21	21
(Singapore) R Ng	21	20
3/4	(Vietnam) Pham CC	23	22

Third round
(Thailand) A Namkul	21	16	21
9/16	(Germany) M Weisskirchen	19	21	13
(Japan) K Tsuneyama	21	21
3/4	(Vietnam) Pham CC	15	18

Fourth round
(Thailand) A Namkul	20	21	13
(Japan) K Tsuneyama	22	11	21

==== Section 7 ====
First round
(Bulgaria) D Nikolov	21	21
(Syria) A Al Jalad	16	19
(Japan) H Shimono	21	21
(United States) T Lam	12	11
(England) S Vendy	21	21
(Netherlands) R Jille	12	15
(Thailand) M Narongrit	21	21
(Russia) R Alimov	13	9
(Spain) V Riera	12	9
(Malaysia) S Ramachandran	21	21
(South Korea) Kim H-t	21	21
(Botswana) T Olekantse	14	12

Second round
(Bulgaria) D Nikolov	16	5
(Japan) H Shimono	21	21
(England) S Vendy	14	15
9/16	(France) T Citron	21	21
(Thailand) M Narongrit	16	19
(Malaysia) S Ramachandran	21	21
(South Korea) Kim H-t	21	21
5/8	(Denmark) R Gemke	18	18

Third round
(Japan) H Shimono	21	21
9/16	(France) T Citron	19	16
(Malaysia) S Ramachandran	21	21
(South Korea) Kim H-t	19	19

Fourth round
(Japan) H Shimono	16	14
(Malaysia) S Ramachandran	21	21

==== Section 8 ====
First round
(Armenia) E Nazaretyan	15	11
(Algeria) M Guelmaoui	21	21
(Hong Kong) Leung KY	14	12
(Vietnam) Pham HN	21	21
(Indonesia) F Kholik	21	19	17
(Malaysia) Lee ZJ	15	21	21
(South Africa) B Von Bodenstein	18	15
(Nepal) N Shrestha	21	21
(Hong Kong) Lee CW	15	21	21
(Canada) J Ho-Shue	21	15	18

Second round
(Algeria) M Guelmaoui	14	13
(Vietnam) Pham HN	21	21
(Malaysia) Lee ZJ	9	10
9/16	(Indonesia) B Pangisthu	21	21
(Nepal) N Shrestha	13	10
(Hong Kong) Lee CW	21	21
(Egypt) A Abdelhakim	6	4
2	(China) Shi YQ	21	21

Third round
(Vietnam) Pham HN	11	7
9/16	(Indonesia) B Pangisthu	21	21
(Hong Kong) Lee CW	14	7
2	(China) Shi YQ	21	21

Fourth round
9/16	(Indonesia) B Pangisthu	20	7
2	(China) Shi YQ	22	21
