= Yuta Watanabe (badminton) =

Japanese badminton player (born 1997)

Yūta Watanabe
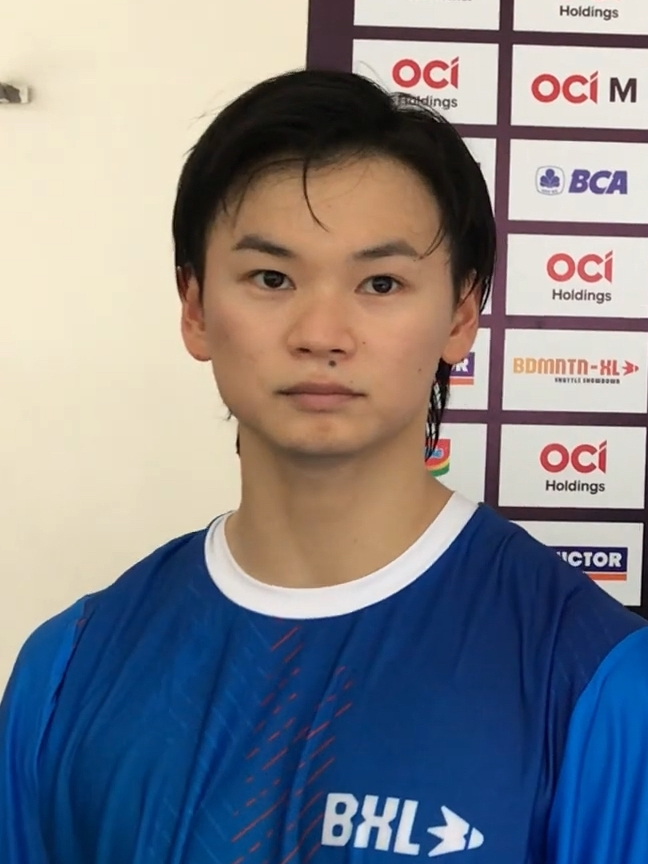
- Watanabe in 2024

Personal information
- Born: 13 June 1997 (age 29) Suginami, Japan
- Height: 1.67 m (5 ft 6 in)
- Weight: 56 kg (123 lb)

Sport
- Country: Japan
- Sport: Badminton
- Handedness: Left
- Coached by: Takeshi Kamura; Jeremy Gan (2018–2024)

Men's & mixed doubles
- Highest ranking: 1 (XD with Arisa Higashino, 8 November 2022); 4 (MD with Hiroyuki Endo, 5 March 2019)
- Current ranking: 10 (XD with Maya Taguchi, 17 November 2026)
- BWF profile
Medal record
Men's badminton
Representing Japan
Olympic Games
Bronze medal – third place	2020 Tokyo	Mixed doubles
Bronze medal – third place	2024 Paris	Mixed doubles
World Championships
Silver medal – second place	2021 Huelva	Mixed doubles
Silver medal – second place	2022 Tokyo	Mixed doubles
Bronze medal – third place	2019 Basel	Mixed doubles
Bronze medal – third place	2023 Copenhagen	Mixed doubles
Sudirman Cup
Silver medal – second place	2019 Nanning	Mixed team
Silver medal – second place	2021 Vantaa	Mixed team
Bronze medal – third place	2017 Gold Coast	Mixed team
Bronze medal – third place	2023 Suzhou	Mixed team
Thomas Cup
Silver medal – second place	2018 Bangkok	Men's team
Bronze medal – third place	2020 Aarhus	Men's team
Bronze medal – third place	2022 Bangkok	Men's team
Asian Games
Silver medal – second place	2022 Hangzhou	Mixed doubles
Bronze medal – third place	2018 Jakarta–Palembang	Men's team
Bronze medal – third place	2022 Hangzhou	Men's team
Asian Championships
Gold medal – first place	2019 Wuhan	Men's doubles
Bronze medal – third place	2022 Manila	Mixed doubles
Bronze medal – third place	2026 Ningbo	Mixed doubles
Asia Mixed Team Championships
Gold medal – first place	2017 Ho Chi Minh	Mixed team
Silver medal – second place	2019 Hong Kong	Mixed team
Asia Team Championships
Bronze medal – third place	2020 Manila	Men's team
World Junior Championships
Bronze medal – third place	2014 Alor Setar	Mixed doubles
Bronze medal – third place	2014 Alor Setar	Mixed team
Bronze medal – third place	2015 Lima	Boys' doubles
Asian Junior Championships
Bronze medal – third place	2014 Taipei	Boys' doubles
Bronze medal – third place	2014 Taipei	Mixed team
Bronze medal – third place	2015 Bangkok	Boys' singles
Bronze medal – third place	2015 Bangkok	Mixed team

Yuta Watanabe (渡辺 勇大, Watanabe Yūta; born 13 June 1997) is a Japanese badminton player. He is a former member of the Japanese national team and joined J-Power in April 2025. He is known for his quick and explosive movements with signature drop shots. Partnered with Arisa Higashino, Watanabe won consecutive mixed doubles bronze medals at the 2020 and 2024 Olympics. The pair has also secured four medals at the BWF World Championships.

== Career ==
=== Early years ===
Watanabe started his career in badminton when he joined the Kodaira junior club in Tokyo in 2005. He had shown his talent in badminton when he won some national event when he was in the elementary school. He made a partnership with Arisa Higashino as his senior in Tomioka Dai-ichi Junior High School in 2012.

Watanabe was selected to join national junior team competed at the 2014 Asian Junior Championships, and helped the team win the mixed team bronze medal. He also settled for another bronze medal in the boys' doubles event partnered with Kenya Mitsuhashi. At the World Junior Championships in Alor Setar, Malaysia, he won the bronze medals in the mixed doubles event with Arisa Higashino and in the mixed team event. In June 2014, he made his first appearance in the senior international event at the Japan Open, competed in the mixed doubles with Higashino, but the duo was defeated in the first round. He captured two titles at the 2014 Korea Junior Open in the boys' and mixed doubles event teamed-up with Mitsuhashi and Chiharu Shida respectively.

Watanabe started the 2015 season, by winning the boys' doubles title at the Dutch Junior tournament with Kenya Mitsuhashi, and finished as the semi-finalists in the mixed doubles with Chiharu Shida, and later won the mixed doubles title in German Junior tournament. In July, he competed at the Asian Junior Championships, clinched the bronze medals in the boys' singles and mixed team events. He reached his first final in the senior international event at the 2015 Russian Open a BWF Grand Prix tournament, where he and his partner Higashino defeated by Chan Peng Soon and Goh Liu Ying. At the Danish Junior Cup, he clinched two titles by winning the boys' singles and doubles events. In November, he won the boys' doubles bronze medal at the World Junior Championships in Lima, Peru.

In 2016, Watanabe won his first senior title at Vietnam International Challenge in the mixed doubles paired-up with Higashino, besides that he became a runner-up in the men's doubles with Mitsuhashi. In 2017, Watanabe started a new partnership with Hiroyuki Endo in the men's doubles. The notional points they both have managed them to compete in the Superseries event; while he and Higashino also have sufficient ranking to entered the Superseries stage. The best achievement during the season is to reach the semi-finals at German Open and Malaysia Masters in the men's doubles, and also semi-finals at the All England Open in the mixed doubles.

=== 2018: Break to top 5 BWF rankings in both mixed and men's doubles; All England Open title ===
Significant progress occurs in 2018 season. Watanabe with his partner Higashino in the mixed doubles and Endo in the men's doubles are able to break the international doubles stage by reaching third and five place in the BWF rankings. Watanabe and Higashino became the first mixed doubles from Japan to win the All England Open since the tournament was first contested in 1899. En route to the finals, they beat the top three seeds, and then clinched the title after defeating the fifth seeded pair Zheng Siwei and Huang Yaqiong in the rubber game. Both also won the Hong Kong Open after beating Wang Yilyu and Huang Dongping in the finals. It was their first win over the world silver medallists in six meetings. Besides that, the duo finished in the semi-finals at the Malaysia, Japan, French, and Fuzhou China Opens; and in the year-end tournament BWF World Tour Finals. Meanwhile, paired with Endo, they won the Korea Open title; and finished as finalists in the Malaysia Open, Thailand Open, and World Tour Finals. Watanabe also part of the Japanese national team that won the silver medal in the Thomas Cup and the bronze in the Asian Games.

=== 2019: Asian Champions ===
In the first half of the 2019 season, Watanabe has collected three titles, two in the men's doubles at the German Open and Asian Championships; and also a title in the mixed doubles at the Malaysia Masters. At the Asian Championships, Watanabe and Endo beating the top seeds and current World number 1, Gideon and Sukamuljo with a landslide score of 21–18, 21–3. He reached the finals in the mixed doubles at the All England Open, and the finals in the men's doubles at the New Zealand Open. Together with the National team, he won the silver medal at the Asia Mixed Team Championships and at the Sudirman Cup.

In the second half of 2019 season, Watanabe has won a title in the mixed doubles. Together with Higashino, they defended the Hong Kong Open title. Their journey in the remainder of the season does look quite difficult. In four meetings against Zheng Siwei and Huang Yaqiong, they only managed to win once, in the group stage of the World Tour Finals; the rest were losses in the finals of the Thailand Open, as well in the semi-finals of the World Championships, French Open and World Tour Finals. The head-to-head record between the pairs stood at 2–8. Meanwhile, with Endo, their best result were finalists in the World Tour Finals, where the duo failed for the sixth time to beat the Indonesian veteran pair Mohammad Ahsan and Hendra Setiawan in their seven meetings.

=== 2020: First All England title ===
In 2020, Watanabe participated in the Badminton Asia Team Championships, where the Japanese men's team finished in the semi-finals. Watanabe then made history for Japan badminton, as he and his partner Endo, becoming the first Japanese men's doubles champions at the All England Open, after beating Marcus Fernaldi Gideon and Kevin Sanjaya Sukamuljo in the final. It was their sixth straight win over Gideon and Sukamuljo. Due to the COVID-19 pandemic, numerous tournaments on the 2020 BWF World Tour were either cancelled or rescheduled for later in the year. He competed in the national events in December, and managed to claim his fourth mixed doubles consecutive title at the Japanese National Championships with Higashino, and third title in the men's doubles with Endo.

=== 2021: Two All England titles, Olympic bronze, and World Championships silver ===
In March, Watanabe won both the men's and mixed doubles disciplines in the All England Open with Hiroyuki Endo and Arisa Higashino. He was the first player in over 19 years to accomplish such a feat. In July, he competed at the 2020 Tokyo Olympics in the men's doubles partnering Endo, and in the mixed doubles with Higashino. Watanabe and Endo's pace was stopped in the quarter-finals to eventual gold medalists Lee Yang and Wang Chi-lin, while in the mixed doubles, Watanabe and Higashino clinched a bronze medal after winning the bronze medal game against Tang Chun Man and Tse Ying Suet in straight games. Since Endo decided to retire from international tournaments after the Tokyo Olympics, Watanabe has focused on competing in mixed doubles. After the Olympics, Watanabe and Higashino reached five finals, winning the Denmark and French Opens, and became a finalist in the Indonesia Open, World Tour Finals, and also at the World Championships.

=== 2022–2023: World #1, fifth All England title, and first Japanese mixed doubles to win the Japan Open ===
In 2022, Watanebe only won a title, where he and his partner, Higashino, successfully to defend the All England Open in March. Furthermore, he and his partner won the silver medal in the World Championships defeating by Zheng Siwei and Huang Yaqiong in the finals, and a bronze medal in the Asian Championships defeating by Wang Yilyu and Huang Dongping in the semi-finals. Another results that they achieved in 2022 were the finalists in the Indonesia and Japan Opens. Watanabe and Higashino then reached their career high as world number 1 in the BWF mixed doubles ranking on 8 November 2022.

Watanabe started the 2023 season by competing in the Malaysia Open, where he and his partner, Higashino, finished as the finalists. In the following week, they emerged as a champion in the India Open, after their opponent Wang Yilyu and Huang Dongping withdrawn from the final match. In March, they unable to defend their All England Open title, since Watanabe struggling with injury in the second round against Kim Won-ho and Jeong Na-eun. Watanabe helps the national team advanced to the knocked out stage in the Sudirman Cup, where the team finished in the semi-finals. In June, Watanabe and Higashino reached the finals in the Singapore and Indonesia Opens. In the next tournaments, they stopped in the quarter-finals of the Canada Open to Taiwanese pairing Lee Jhe-huei and Hsu Ya-ching, and then in the semi-finals of the Korea Open to Chinese rising star Jiang Zhenbang and Wei Yaxin. The duo then won the Japan Open, becoming the first ever Japanaese pairing to claimed the Japan Open title since it was first contested in 1982. They clinched the bronze medal in the World Championships defeating by Seo Seung-jae and Chae Yoo-jung in the semi-finals. He competed in the 2022 Asian Games, won a silver in the mixed doubles and a bronze in the men's team event. In the rest of the season, Watanabe and Higashino finished as the semi-finalists in the French Open, Japan Masters, as well in the year-end finals tournament the World Tour Finals.

=== 2024 ===
Watanabe and Higashino opened the 2024 season as a champion in the Malaysia Open. Another result that the duo achieved in the first half of the season were finalists in the All England Open, quarter-finalists in the India Open, French Open, and at the Asian Championships. In two tournaments before the Paris Olympics, they suffered early rounds defeat in the Singapore and Indonesia Opens. At the 2024 Paris Olympics, Watanabe and Higashino successfully defended their bronze medal by defeating South Korea's Seo Seung-jae and Chae Yoo-jung, becoming the first Japanese pair to win consecutive Olympic medals in the discipline. However, the Japan Open marked the end of their 13-year partnership. He then made a new partnership with Maya Taguchi, and made a debut in the Denmark Open, where they lost in the first round. They suffered a series of defeats in the early rounds in the first round of the Japan Masters and in the second round of the China Masters.

=== 2025 ===
Watanabe and Taguchi continued their partnership in this year which they suffered second round losses in both India Open and Indonesia Masters. This pair got better in their next two tournament when they manage to score two finals and win one in Sri Lanka International. In July, Watanabe reached quarterfinals with new partner, Hina Osawa at Macau Open in which both of them withdrawed due to Watanabe's injury prior to the match. Two months later in Hong Kong Open, Watanabe improved his game and grabbed the semifinals spot alongside a veteran shuttler, Misaki Matsutomo where they lost to eventual champion, Feng Yanzhe and Huang Dongping. In October, Watanabe paired again with Taguchi and finally won their first world tour together, Malaysia Super 100.

=== 2026 ===
Watanabe and Taguchi began the year with a first-round loss at the India Open and a second-round defeat at the Indonesia Masters. In March, the pair won the Singapore International, defeating Hong Kong's Chan Yin Chak and Ng Tsz Yau in the final. At the Asian Championships in Ningbo, China, Watanabe and Taguchi won the bronze medal after reaching the semifinals, where they were defeated by eventual champions Kim Jae-hyeon and Jang Ha-jeong.

After Watanabe suffered an injury in May, the pair withdrew from the Indonesia Open and the Australian Open in June. Following his return to competition in July, Watanabe and Taguchi went on to win back-to-back Super 300 titles. At the Taipei Open, they defeated home pair Yang Po-hsuan and Hu Ling-fang in the final. They followed this by winning the Korea Masters, defeating reigning Asian champions Kim Jae-hyeon and Jang Ha-jeong in the final.

== Media and public appearances ==
In 2022, Watanabe and his mixed doubles partner Arisa Higashino made cameo appearances as themselves in the fourth episode of the badminton anime series Love All Play, marking their voice-acting debuts.

On 15 July 2022, Watanabe appeared at the ceremonial first pitch of a Yomiuri Giants baseball game against the Hiroshima Toyo Carp at Tokyo Dome, serving as the catcher for Higashino's pitch.

In October 2024, Watanabe competed on TBS's sports competition programme Ultimate Sports Guys Summit Battle 2024 Autumn, winning the Hard Jumper event after clearing a rotating hurdle 210 consecutive times.

== Career milestones ==
Watanabe has achieved several historical firsts in Japanese badminton.

Mixed doubles firsts

- First Japanese mixed doubles pair to attain the World No. 1 ranking (8 November 2022).
- First Japanese mixed doubles pair to win an Asian Games silver medal (2022).
- First Japanese mixed doubles winners of the All England Open (2018), Hong Kong Open (2018), Malaysia Masters (2019), Denmark Open (2021), French Open (2021), India Open (2023), Japan Open (2023), Malaysia Open (2024), Taipei Open (2026), and the Korea Masters (2026).

Men's doubles firsts

- First Japanese men's doubles pair to win the Asian Championships (2019).
- First Japanese men's doubles winners of the Korea Open (2018), and the All England Open (2020).

Individual Firsts

- First male player in over 19 years to win both the men's and mixed doubles titles at the same All England Open (2021).

== Achievements ==
=== Olympic Games ===
Mixed doubles
Year	Venue	Partner	Opponent	Score	Result	Ref.
2020	Musashino Forest Sport Plaza, Tokyo, Japan	(Japan) Arisa Higashino	(Hong Kong) Tang Chun Man (Hong Kong) Tse Ying Suet	21–17, 23–21	Bronze	
2024	Porte de La Chapelle Arena, Paris, France	(Japan) Arisa Higashino	(South Korea) Seo Seung-jae (South Korea) Chae Yoo-jung	21–13, 22–20	Bronze	

=== World Championships ===
Mixed doubles
Year	Venue	Partner	Opponent	Score	Result	Ref.
2019	St. Jakobshalle, Basel, Switzerland	(Japan) Arisa Higashino	(China) Zheng Siwei (China) Huang Yaqiong	11–21, 15–21	Bronze	
2021	Palacio de los Deportes Carolina Marín, Huelva, Spain	(Japan) Arisa Higashino	(Thailand) Dechapol Puavaranukroh (Thailand) Sapsiree Taerattanachai	13–21, 14–21	Silver	
2022	Tokyo Metropolitan Gymnasium, Tokyo, Japan	(Japan) Arisa Higashino	(China) Zheng Siwei (China) Huang Yaqiong	13–21, 16–21	Silver	
2023	Royal Arena, Copenhagen, Denmark	(Japan) Arisa Higashino	(South Korea) Seo Seung-jae (South Korea) Chae Yoo-jung	15–21, 13–21	Bronze	

=== Asian Games ===
Mixed doubles
Year	Venue	Partner	Opponent	Score	Result	Ref.
2022	Binjiang Gymnasium, Hangzhou, China	(Japan) Arisa Higashino	(China) Zheng Siwei (China) Huang Yaqiong	15–21, 14–21	Silver	

=== Asian Championships ===
Men's doubles
Year	Venue	Partner	Opponent	Score	Result	Ref.
2019	Wuhan Sports Center Gymnasium, Wuhan, China	(Japan) Hiroyuki Endo	(Indonesia) Marcus Fernaldi Gideon (Indonesia) Kevin Sanjaya Sukamuljo	21–18, 21–3	Gold	

Mixed doubles
Year	Venue	Partner	Opponent	Score	Result	Ref.
2022	Muntinlupa Sports Complex, Metro Manila, Philippines	(Japan) Arisa Higashino	(China) Wang Yilyu (China) Huang Dongping	12–21, 22–24	Bronze	
2026	Ningbo Olympic Sports Center Gymnasium, Ningbo, China	(Japan) Maya Taguchi	(South Korea) Kim Jae-hyeon (South Korea) Jang Ha-jeong	18–21, 11–21	Bronze	

=== World Junior Championships ===
Boys' doubles
Year	Venue	Partner	Opponent	Score	Result	Ref.
2015	Centro de Alto Rendimiento de la Videna, Lima, Peru	(Japan) Kenya Mitsuhashi	(China) He Jiting (China) Zheng Siwei	13–21, 16–21	Bronze	

Mixed doubles
Year	Venue	Partner	Opponent	Score	Result	Ref.
2014	Stadium Sultan Abdul Halim, Alor Setar, Malaysia	(Japan) Arisa Higashino	(China) Huang Kaixiang (China) Chen Qingchen	19–21, 12–21	Bronze	

=== Asian Junior Championships ===
Boys' singles
Year	Venue	Opponent	Score	Result	Ref.
2015	CPB Badminton Training Center, Bangkok, Thailand	(China) Lin Guipu	10–21, 12–21	Bronze	

Boys' doubles
Year	Venue	Partner	Opponent	Score	Result	Ref.
2014	Taipei Gymnasium, Taipei, Taiwan	(Japan) Kenya Mitsuhashi	(China) Huang Kaixiang (China) Zheng Siwei	10–21, 8–21	Bronze	

=== BWF World Tour (18 titles, 15 runners-up) ===
The BWF World Tour, which was announced on 19 March 2017 and implemented in 2018, is a series of elite badminton tournaments sanctioned by the Badminton World Federation (BWF). The BWF World Tour is divided into levels of World Tour Finals, Super 1000, Super 750, Super 500, Super 300, and the BWF Tour Super 100.

Men's doubles
Year	Tournament	Level	Partner	Opponent	Score	Result	Ref.
2018	Malaysia Open	Super 750	(Japan) Hiroyuki Endo	(Japan) Takeshi Kamura (Japan) Keigo Sonoda	8–21, 10–21	(silver) Runner-up	
2018	Thailand Open	Super 500	(Japan) Hiroyuki Endo	(Japan) Takeshi Kamura (Japan) Keigo Sonoda	17–21, 19–21	(silver) Runner-up	
2018	Korea Open	Super 500	(Japan) Hiroyuki Endo	(Japan) Takuro Hoki (Japan) Yugo Kobayashi	9–21, 21–15, 21–10	(gold) Winner	
2018	BWF World Tour Finals	World Tour Finals	(Japan) Hiroyuki Endo	(China) Li Junhui (China) Liu Yuchen	15–21, 11–21	(silver) Runner-up	
2019	German Open	Super 300	(Japan) Hiroyuki Endo	(Japan) Takeshi Kamura (Japan) Keigo Sonoda	15–21, 21–11, 21–12	(gold) Winner	
2019	New Zealand Open	Super 300	(Japan) Hiroyuki Endo	(Indonesia) Mohammad Ahsan (Indonesia) Hendra Setiawan	22–20, 15–21, 17–21	(silver) Runner-up	
2019	BWF World Tour Finals	World Tour Finals	(Japan) Hiroyuki Endo	(Indonesia) Mohammad Ahsan (Indonesia) Hendra Setiawan	22–24, 19–21	(silver) Runner-up	
2020	All England Open	Super 1000	(Japan) Hiroyuki Endo	(Indonesia) Marcus Fernaldi Gideon (Indonesia) Kevin Sanjaya Sukamuljo	21–18, 12–21, 21–19	(gold) Winner	
2021	All England Open	Super 1000	(Japan) Hiroyuki Endo	(Japan) Takeshi Kamura (Japan) Keigo Sonoda	21–15, 17–21, 21–11	(gold) Winner	

Mixed doubles
Year	Tournament	Level	Partner	Opponent	Score	Result	Ref.
2018	All England Open	Super 1000	(Japan) Arisa Higashino	(China) Zheng Siwei (China) Huang Yaqiong	15–21, 22–20, 21–16	(gold) Winner	
2018	Hong Kong Open	Super 500	(Japan) Arisa Higashino	(China) Wang Yilyu (China) Huang Dongping	21–18, 21–14	(gold) Winner	
2019	Malaysia Masters	Super 500	(Japan) Arisa Higashino	(Thailand) Dechapol Puavaranukroh (Thailand) Sapsiree Taerattanachai	21–18, 21–18	(gold) Winner	
2019	All England Open	Super 1000	(Japan) Arisa Higashino	(China) Zheng Siwei (China) Huang Yaqiong	17–21, 20–22	(silver) Runner-up	
2019	Thailand Open	Super 500	(Japan) Arisa Higashino	(China) Wang Yilyu (China) Huang Dongping	22–24, 21–23	(silver) Runner-up	
2019	Hong Kong Open	Super 500	(Japan) Arisa Higashino	(China) He Jiting (China) Du Yue	22–20, 21–16	(gold) Winner	
2021	All England Open	Super 1000	(Japan) Arisa Higashino	(Japan) Yuki Kaneko (Japan) Misaki Matsutomo	21–14, 21–13	(gold) Winner	
2021	Denmark Open	Super 1000	(Japan) Arisa Higashino	(Thailand) Dechapol Puavaranukroh (Thailand) Sapsiree Taerattanachai	21–18, 21–9	(gold) Winner	
2021	French Open	Super 750	(Japan) Arisa Higashino	(Denmark) Mathias Christiansen (Denmark) Alexandra Bøje	21–8, 21–17	(gold) Winner	
2021	Indonesia Open	Super 1000	(Japan) Arisa Higashino	(Thailand) Dechapol Puavaranukroh (Thailand) Sapsiree Taerattanachai	12–21, 13–21	(silver) Runner-up	
2021	BWF World Tour Finals	World Tour Finals	(Japan) Arisa Higashino	(Thailand) Dechapol Puavaranukroh (Thailand) Sapsiree Taerattanachai	19–21, 11–21	(silver) Runner-up	
2022	All England Open	Super 1000	(Japan) Arisa Higashino	(China) Wang Yilyu (China) Huang Dongping	21–19, 21–19	(gold) Winner	
2022	Indonesia Open	Super 1000	(Japan) Arisa Higashino	(China) Zheng Siwei (China) Huang Yaqiong	14–21, 16–21	(silver) Runner-up	
2022	Japan Open	Super 750	(Japan) Arisa Higashino	(Thailand) Dechapol Puavaranukroh (Thailand) Sapsiree Taerattanachai	21–16, 21–23, 18–21	(silver) Runner-up	
2023	Malaysia Open	Super 1000	(Japan) Arisa Higashino	(China) Zheng Siwei (China) Huang Yaqiong	19–21, 11–21	(silver) Runner-up	
2023	India Open	Super 750	(Japan) Arisa Higashino	(China) Wang Yilyu (China) Huang Dongping	Walkover	(gold) Winner	
2023	Singapore Open	Super 750	(Japan) Arisa Higashino	(Denmark) Mathias Christiansen (Denmark) Alexandra Bøje	14–21, 22–20, 16–21	(silver) Runner-up	
2023	Indonesia Open	Super 1000	(Japan) Arisa Higashino	(China) Zheng Siwei (China) Huang Yaqiong	14–21, 11–21	(silver) Runner-up	
2023	Japan Open	Super 750	(Japan) Arisa Higashino	(Thailand) Dechapol Puavaranukroh (Thailand) Sapsiree Taerattanachai	17–21, 21–16, 21–15	(gold) Winner	
2024	Malaysia Open	Super 1000	(Japan) Arisa Higashino	(South Korea) Kim Won-ho (South Korea) Jeong Na-eun	21–18, 21–15	(gold) Winner	
2024	All England Open	Super 1000	(Japan) Arisa Higashino	(China) Zheng Siwei (China) Huang Yaqiong	16–21, 11–21	(silver) Runner-up	
2025	Malaysia Super 100	Super 100	(Japan) Maya Taguchi	(Indonesia) Dejan Ferdinansyah (Indonesia) Bernadine Wardana	21–18, 21–12	(gold) Winner	
2026	Taipei Open	Super 300	(Japan) Maya Taguchi	(Chinese Taipei) Yang Po-hsuan (Chinese Taipei) Hu Ling-fang	21–19, 21–8	(gold) Winner	
2026	Korea Masters	Super 300	(Japan) Maya Taguchi	(South Korea) Kim Jae-hyeon (South Korea) Jang Ha-jeong	21–19, 21–14	(gold) Winner	

=== BWF Grand Prix (1 runner-up) ===
The BWF Grand Prix had two levels, the Grand Prix and Grand Prix Gold. It was a series of badminton tournaments sanctioned by the Badminton World Federation (BWF) and played between 2007 and 2017.

Mixed doubles
Year	Tournament	Partner	Opponent	Score	Result	Ref.
2015	Russian Open	(Japan) Arisa Higashino	(Malaysia) Chan Peng Soon (Malaysia) Goh Liu Ying	13–21, 21–23	(silver) Runner-up	

BWF Grand Prix tournament

=== BWF International Challenge/Series (3 titles, 3 runners-up) ===
Men's doubles
Year	Tournament	Partner	Opponent	Score	Result	Ref.
2016	Austrian Open	(Japan) Kenya Mitsuhashi	(England) Marcus Ellis (England) Chris Langridge	14–21, 16–21	(silver) Runner-up	
2016	Vietnam International	(Japan) Kenya Mitsuhashi	(Malaysia) Ong Yew Sin (Malaysia) Teo Ee Yi	19–21, 14–21	(silver) Runner-up	

Mixed doubles
Year	Tournament	Partner	Opponent	Score	Result	Ref.
2016	Vietnam International	(Japan) Arisa Higashino	(Thailand) Tinn Isriyanet (Thailand) Pacharapun Chochuwong	21–16, 21–14	(gold) Winner	
2025	Sri Lanka International	(Japan) Maya Taguchi	(Indonesia) Bobby Setiabudi (Indonesia) Melati Daeva Oktavianti	21–16, 14–21, 18–21	(silver) Runner-up	
2025	Sri Lanka International	(Japan) Maya Taguchi	(Thailand) Ratchapol Makkasasithorn (Thailand) Nattamon Laisuan	21–15, 21–16	(gold) Winner	
2026	Singapore International	(Japan) Maya Taguchi	(Hong Kong) Chan Yin Chak (Hong Kong) Ng Tsz Yau	21–15, 21–13	(gold) Winner	

BWF International Challenge tournament
BWF International Series tournament

== Performance timeline ==
Key

W	Won	F	Finalist	SF	Semi-finalist
QF	Quarter-finalist	#R	Rounds 4, 3, 2, 1	RR	Round-robin stage
Q#	Qualification round	A	Absent	w/d	Withdrew
G	Gold	S	Silver	B	Bronze
NH	Not held	N/A	Not applicable	DNQ	Did not qualify

=== National team ===
- Junior level

Team events	2014	2015	Ref
Asian Junior Championships	B	B	
World Junior Championships	B	4th	

- Senior level

Team events	2017	2018	2019	2020	2021	2022	2023	2024	2025	2026	Ref
Asia Team Championships	NH	QF	NH	A	NH	A	NH	A	NH	A	
Asia Mixed Team Championships	G	NH	S	NH			QF	NH	A	NH	
Asian Games	NH	B	NH			B	NH			5th	
Thomas Cup	NH	S	NH		B	B	NH	A	NH	A	
Sudirman Cup	B	NH	S	NH	S	NH	B	NH	A	NH	

=== Individual competitions ===
==== Junior level ====
- Boys' singles

Event	2015	Ref
Asia Junior Championships	B	
World Junior Championships	2R	

- Boys' doubles

Event	2014	2015	Ref
Asia Junior Championships	B	1R	
World Junior Championships	1R	B	

- Mixed doubles

Event	2014	Ref
Asia Junior Championships	3R	
World Junior Championships	B	

==== Senior level ====
===== Men's singles =====
Tournament	Grand Prix	Best	Ref
Tournament	2015	Best	Ref
Russian Open	1R	1R ('15)	
Year-end ranking	1,091	973	

===== Men's doubles =====
Event	2017	2018	2019	2020	Ref
Asian Championships	2R	QF	G	NH	
World Championships	2R	3R	2R	NH	
Olympic Games	NH			QF	

Tournament	BWF Superseries / Grand Prix			BWF World Tour				Best	Ref
Tournament	2015	2016	2017	2018	2019	2020	2021	Best	Ref
Syed Modi International	A			1R	A	NH		1R ('18)	
German Open	A		SF	1R	W	NH		W ('19)	
All England Open	A		1R	SF	2R	W	W	W ('20, '21)	
Korea Open	A			W	2R	NH		W ('18)	
Korea Masters	A	QF	A			NH		QF ('16)	
Thailand Open	A			F	SF	NH		F ('18)	
Indonesia Masters	A		NH	1R	QF	A		QF ('19)	
Indonesia Open	A		1R	2R	QF	NH	A	QF ('19)	
Malaysia Open	A		1R	F	1R	NH		F ('18)	
Malaysia Masters	A		SF	2R	QF	A	NH	SF ('17)	
Singapore Open	A		1R	A	2R	NH		2R ('19)	
Japan Open	A	2R	A	1R	QF	NH		QF ('19)	
U.S. Open	A	2R	A			NH		2R ('16)	
Denmark Open	A			1R	QF	w/d	A	QF ('19)	
French Open	A			2R	SF	NH	A	SF ('19)	
Hong Kong Open	A	2R	A	1R	SF	NH		SF ('19)	
Australian Open	A		2R	A	1R	NH		2R ('17)	
New Zealand Open	A				F	NH		F ('19)	
China Open	A	1R	1R	1R	QF	NH		QF ('19)	
China Masters	A			2R	2R	NH		2R ('18, '19)	
Russian Open	2R	A				NH		2R ('15)	
U.S. Grand Prix	1R	N/A				NH		1R ('15)	
Superseries / World Tour Finals	DNQ			F	F	DNQ		F ('18, '19)	
Year-end ranking	224	62	27	5	6	5	5	5	
Tournament	2015	2016	2017	2018	2019	2020	2021	Best	Ref

===== Mixed doubles =====
Event	2017	2018	2019	2020	2021	2022	2023	2024	2025	2026	Ref
Asian Championships	1R	2R	QF	NH		B	w/d	QF	w/d	B	
Asian Games	NH	QF	NH			S	NH			2R	
World Championships	2R	3R	B	NH	S	S	B	NH	DNQ	3R	
Olympic Games	NH			B	NH			B	NH		

Tournament	BWF Superseries / Grand Prix				BWF World Tour									Best	Ref
Tournament	2014	2015	2016	2017	2018	2019	2020	2021	2022	2023	2024	2025	2026	Best	Ref
Malaysia Open	A			1R	SF	1R	NH		1R	F	W	A		W ('24)	
India Open	A			1R	A					W	QF	2R	1R	W ('23)	
Indonesia Masters	A			NH	1R	SF	A	SF	A	w/d	A	2R	2R	SF ('19, '21)	
German Open	A			1R	2R	QF	NH		1R	2R	A			QF ('19)	
All England Open	A			SF	W	F	2R	W	W	2R	F	A		W ('18, '21, '22)	
Ruichang China Masters	NA				A		NH			A		2R	A	2R ('25)	
Swiss Open	A						NH	A					Q2	Q2 ('26)	
Orléans Masters	A						NH	A					QF	QF ('26)	
Thailand Open	A				1R	F	NH		SF	A				F ('19)	
Malaysia Masters	A				1R	W	A	NH	QF	A				W ('19)	
Singapore Open	A			1R	A	1R	NH		A	F	1R	2R	2R	F ('23)	
Indonesia Open	A			2R	QF	1R	NH	F	F	F	1R	A	w/d	F ('21, '22, '23)	
Australian Open	A			1R	A	SF	NH		w/d	w/d	A		w/d	SF ('19)	
Macau Open	A						NH				A	QF	A	QF ('25)	
U.S. Open	A		2R	A			NH			A				2R ('16)	
Canada Open	A						NH		A	QF	A			QF ('23)	
Japan Open	1R	Q8	2R	A	SF	QF	NH		F	W	QF	1R	2R	W ('23)	
China Open	A		QF	1R	QF	QF	NH			QF	w/d	A	QF	QF ('16, '18, '19, '23, '26)	
Taipei Open	A						NH		A				W	W ('26)	
Korea Masters	A		2R	A			NH		A				W	W ('26)	
China Masters	A		SF	A	SF	SF	NH			1R	2R	A	1R	SF ('16, '18, '19)	
Indonesia Masters Super 100	N/A				A		NH		A	A			A	SF ('25 II)	
Indonesia Masters Super 100	N/A				A		NH		A	A		SF	A	SF ('25 II)	
Denmark Open	A				1R	1R	w/d	W	QF	2R	1R	A	2R	W ('21)	
Malaysia Super 100	N/A									A		W	A	W ('25)	
French Open	A				SF	SF	NH	W	w/d	SF	QF	A	2R	W ('21)	
Korea Open	A				QF	QF	NH		A	SF	A	2R	QF	SF ('23)	
Japan Masters	N/A									SF	1R	w/d	SF	SF ('23, '26)	
Hong Kong Open	A		2R	A	W	W	NH			w/d	A	SF	2R	W ('18, '19)	
Superseries / World Tour Finals	DNQ				SF	SF	DNQ	F	w/d	SF	DNQ		Q	F ('21)	
New Zealand Open	A		QF	A			NH							QF ('16)	
Russian Open	A	F	A				NH							F ('15)	
Year-end ranking	421	184	22	29	3	3	5	4	4	2	9	52		2	
Tournament	2014	2015	2016	2017	2018	2019	2020	2021	2022	2023	2024	2025	2026	Best	Ref
