= Lin Guipu =

Chinese badminton player (born 1997)

Lin Guipu 林贵埔
Personal information
- Born: 21 April 1997 (age 29) Wenzhou Zhejiang, China
- Height: 1.82 m (6 ft 0 in)

Sport
- Country: China
- Sport: Badminton
- Handedness: Right

Men's singles
- Highest ranking: 91 (7 April 2016)
- BWF profile
Medal record
Men's badminton
Representing China
Youth Olympic Games
| Silver medal – second place | 2014 Nanjing | Boys' singles |
World Junior Championships
| Gold medal – first place | 2014 Alor Setar | Boys' singles |
| Gold medal – first place | 2014 Alor Setar | Mixed team |
| Gold medal – first place | 2015 Lima | Mixed team |
| Bronze medal – third place | 2013 Bangkok | Mixed team |
Asian Youth Games
| Gold medal – first place | 2013 Nanjing | Boys' singles |
Asian Junior Championships
| Gold medal – first place | 2013 Kota Kinabalu | Mixed team |
| Gold medal – first place | 2014 Taipei | Mixed team |
| Gold medal – first place | 2015 Bangkok | Boys' singles |
| Gold medal – first place | 2015 Bangkok | Mixed team |

Lin Guipu (Chinese: 林贵埔; born 21 April 1997) is a Chinese badminton player.

== Achievements ==
=== Youth Olympic Games ===
Boys' singles
| Year | Venue | Opponent | Score | Result |
|---|---|---|---|---|
| 2014 | Nanjing Sport Institute; Nanjing, China | (China) Shi Yuqi | 15–21, 19–21 | Silver |

=== BWF World Junior Championships ===
Boys' singles
| Year | Venue | Opponent | Score | Result |
|---|---|---|---|---|
| 2014 | Stadium Sultan Abdul Halim; Alor Setar, Malaysia | (China) Shi Yuqi | 20–22, 21–8, 21–18 | Gold |

=== Asian Youth Games ===
Boys' singles
| Year | Venue | Opponent | Score | Result |
|---|---|---|---|---|
| 2013 | Nanjing Sport Institute; Nanjing, China | (Hong Kong) Lee Cheuk Yiu | 24–22, 21–14 | Gold |

=== Asian Junior Championships ===
Boys' singles
| Year | Venue | Opponent | Score | Result |
|---|---|---|---|---|
| 2015 | CPB Badminton Training Center; Bangkok, Thailand | (South Korea) Seo Seung-jae | 21–16, 21–11 | Gold |

=== BWF International Challenge/Series ===
Men's singles
| Year | Tournament | Opponent | Score | Result |
|---|---|---|---|---|
| 2016 | China International | (China) Zhao Junpeng | 21–7, 22–20 | (gold) Winner |

BWF International Challenge tournament
BWF International Series tournament
