= Ng Tsz Yau =

Hong Kong badminton player (born 1998)

Ng Tsz Yau 吳芷柔
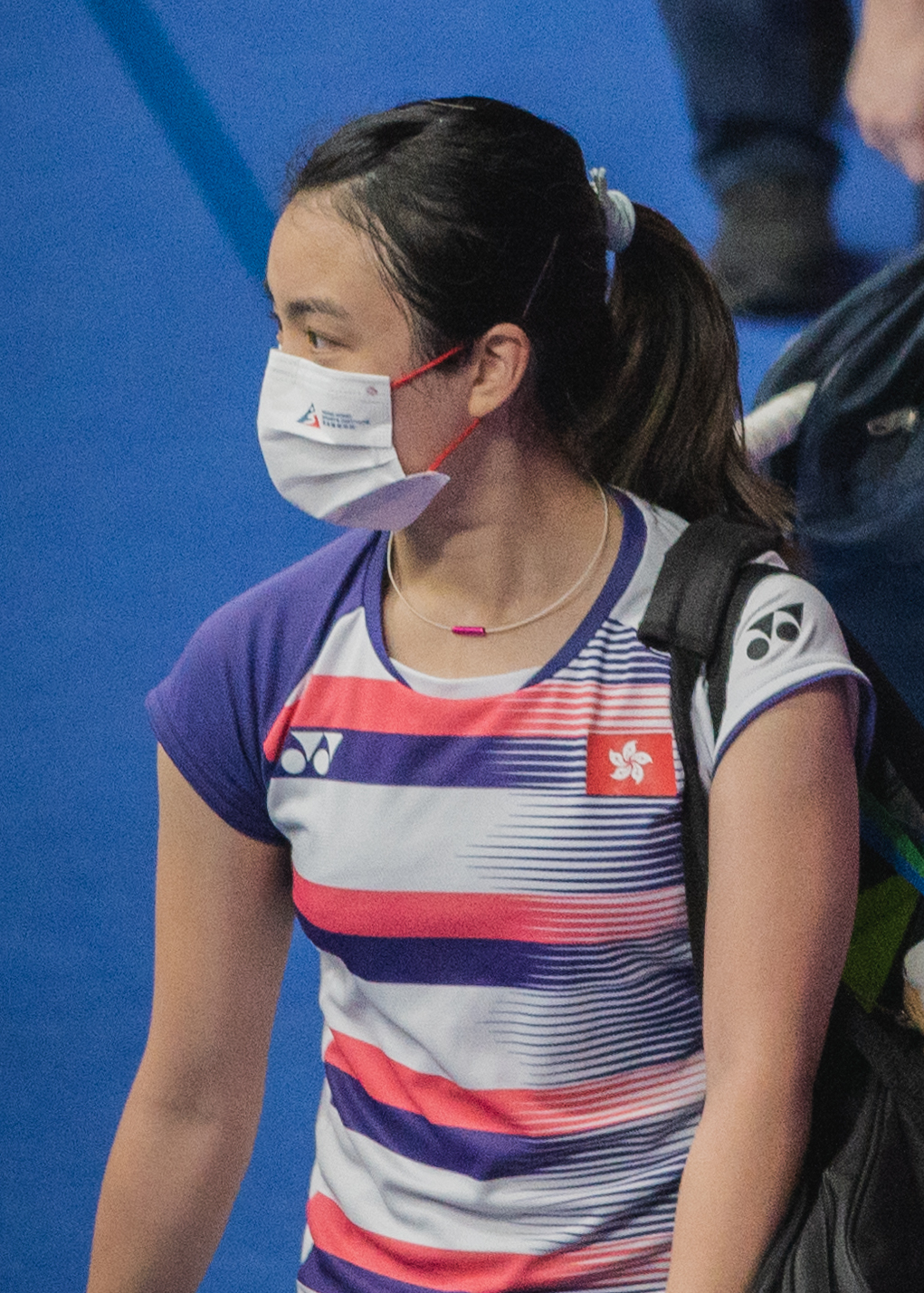
- Ng at the 2022 Taipei Open

Personal information
- Born: 24 April 1998 (age 28) Hong Kong
- Height: 1.62 m (5 ft 4 in)

Sport
- Country: Hong Kong
- Sport: Badminton
- Handedness: Right

Women's & mixed doubles
- Highest ranking: 28 (WD with Yuen Sin Ying, 6 December 2018); 21 (XD with Lee Chun Hei, 24 January 2023)
- Current ranking: 25 (XD with Chan Yin Chak, 10 November 2026)
- BWF profile
Medal record
Women's badminton
Representing Hong Kong
Asia Mixed Team Championships
Bronze medal – third place	2019 Hong Kong	Mixed team
Representing (International Olympic Committee) Mixed-NOCs
Youth Olympic Games
Gold medal – first place	2014 Nanjing	Mixed doubles

Ng Tsz Yau
- Traditional Chinese: 吳芷柔
- Simplified Chinese: 吴芷柔
Transcriptions
Standard Mandarin
- Hanyu Pinyin: Wú Zhǐróu
Yue: Cantonese
- Jyutping: Ng4 Zi2 Jau4

Yoyo Ng Tsz Yau (Chinese: 吳芷柔; born 24 April 1998) is a Hong Kong badminton player. She started playing badminton at aged 5, and in 2013, she competed in the women's doubles event with Yeung Nga Ting. In 2017, she reached the mixed doubles semi final round at the Malaysia Masters, and in November 2017, she and Yeung won the senior tournament at the Tata Open India International tournament.

== Career ==
Ng competes in both women's and mixed doubles and has won tournaments with several different partners. In 2014, she competed at the Summer Youth Olympics in Nanjing, China. She won the mixed doubles gold medal together with partner Cheam June Wei.

She won the 2018 Hyderabad Open title with Yuen Sin Ying after beating Vivian Hoo and Yap Cheng Wen of Malaysia. She also partnered with Tang Chun Man for a brief period and won the 2019 Lingshui China Masters.

In 2022, she participated in the Taipei Open and reached the finals in both women's and mixed doubles. She won both finals, being partnered with Lee Chun Hei in mixed doubles and Tsang Hiu Yan in women's doubles.

== Achievements ==
=== Youth Olympic Games ===
Mixed doubles
Year	Venue	Partner	Opponent	Score	Result
2014	Nanjing Sport Institute; Nanjing, China	(Malaysia) Cheam June Wei	(Japan) Kanta Tsuneyama (Chinese Taipei) Lee Chia-hsin	21–14, 23–21	Gold

=== BWF World Tour (5 titles, 2 runners-up) ===
The BWF World Tour, which was announced on 19 March 2017 and implemented in 2018, is a series of elite badminton tournaments sanctioned by the Badminton World Federation (BWF). The BWF World Tour is divided into levels of World Tour Finals, Super 1000, Super 750, Super 500, Super 300, and the BWF Tour Super 100.

Women's doubles
Year	Tournament	Level	Partner	Opponent	Score	Result
2018	Hyderabad Open	Super 100	(Hong Kong) Yuen Sin Ying	(Malaysia) Vivian Hoo (Malaysia) Yap Cheng Wen	21–18, 16–21, 21–14	(gold) Winner
2022	Taipei Open	Super 300	(Hong Kong) Tsang Hiu Yan	(Japan) Rui Hirokami (Japan) Yuna Kato	21–15, 18–21, 21–19	(gold) Winner

Mixed doubles
Year	Tournament	Level	Partner	Opponent	Score	Result
2019	Lingshui China Masters	Super 100	(Hong Kong) Tang Chun Man	(China) Guo Xinwa (China) Liu Xuanxuan	16–21, 21–14, 21–13	(gold) Winner
2022	Taipei Open	Super 300	(Hong Kong) Lee Chun Hei	(Thailand) Ruttanapak Oupthong (Thailand) Chasinee Korepap	21–8, 21–9	(gold) Winner
2025	Ruichang China Masters	Super 100	(Hong Kong) Tang Chun Man	(China) Zhang Hanyu (China) Tang Ruizhi	21–17, 18–21, 21–12	(gold) Winner
2026	Baoji China Masters	Super 100	(Hong Kong) Chan Yin Chak	(China) Ma Xixiang (China) Qin Huizhi	23–25, 19–21	(silver) Runner-up
2026	Macau Open	Super 300	(Hong Kong) Chan Yin Chak	(China) Jiang Zhenbang (China) Wei Yaxin	14–21, 14–21	(silver) Runner-up

=== BWF International Challenge/Series (8 titles, 4 runners-up) ===
Women's doubles
Year	Tournament	Partner	Opponent	Score	Result
2017	Tata Open India International	(Hong Kong) Yeung Nga Ting	(Hong Kong) Ng Wing Yung (Hong Kong) Yuen Sin Ying	23–25, 21–14, 21–19	(gold) Winner
2018	Singapore International	(Hong Kong) Yuen Sin Ying	(Hong Kong) Ng Wing Yung (Hong Kong) Yeung Nga Ting	21–17, 21–17	(gold) Winner
2021	Bahrain International Series	(Hong Kong) Tsang Hiu Yan	(Hong Kong) Yeung Nga Ting (Hong Kong) Yeung Pui Lam	13–21, 18–21	(silver) Runner-up
2021	Bahrain International Challenge	(Hong Kong) Tsang Hiu Yan	(Hong Kong) Yeung Nga Ting (Hong Kong) Yeung Pui Lam	12–21, 18–21	(silver) Runner-up
2022	Dutch International	(Hong Kong) Tsang Hiu Yan	(Hong Kong) Yeung Nga Ting (Hong Kong) Yeung Pui Lam	22–20, 14–21, 23–21	(gold) Winner

Mixed doubles
Year	Tournament	Partner	Opponent	Score	Result
2018	Singapore International	(Hong Kong) Yeung Ming Nok	(Indonesia) Adnan Maulana (Indonesia) Masita Mahmudin	19–21, 21–7, 21–18	(gold) Winner
2021	Bahrain International Series	(Hong Kong) Lee Chun Hei	(Hong Kong) Law Cheuk Him (Hong Kong) Yeung Nga Ting	23–21, 21–12	(gold) Winner
2022	Dutch International	(Hong Kong) Lee Chun Hei	(Denmark) Jesper Toft (Denmark) Clara Graversen	21–9, 21–14	(gold) Winner
2022	Denmark Masters	(Hong Kong) Lee Chun Hei	(Indonesia) Dejan Ferdinansyah (Indonesia) Gloria Emanuelle Widjaja	16–21, 19–21	(silver) Runner-up
2025	Vietnam International	(Hong Kong) Tang Chun Man	(Malaysia) Jimmy Wong (Malaysia) Lai Pei Jing	21–19, 21–19	(gold) Winner
2026	Singapore International	(Hong Kong) Chan Yin Chak	(Japan) Yuta Watanabe (Japan) Maya Taguchi	15–21, 13–21	(silver) Runner-up
2026	Vietnam International	(Hong Kong) Chan Yin Chak	(Japan) Hiroki Midorikawa (Japan) Nami Matsuyama	14–17 (retired)	(gold) Winner

BWF International Challenge tournament
BWF International Series tournament
