= Zhao Junpeng =

Chinese badminton player (born 1996)

Zhao Junpeng 赵俊鹏
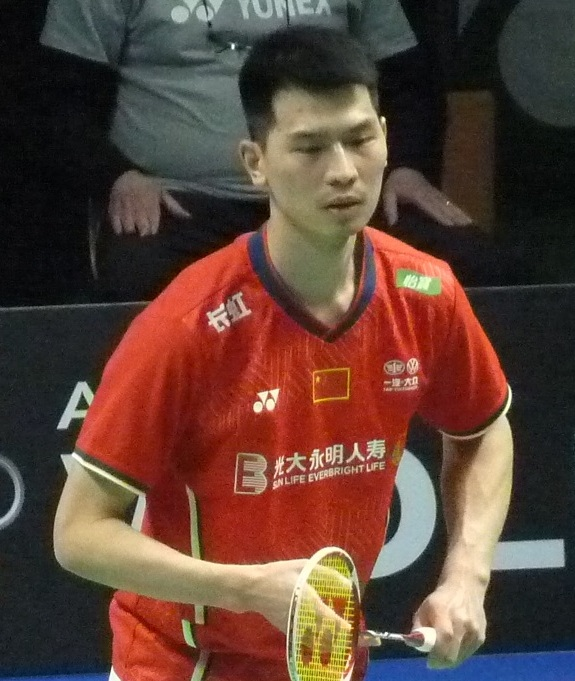
- Zhao at the 2022 German Open

Personal information
- Born: 2 February 1996 (age 30) Nanchang, Jiangxi, China
- Height: 1.85 m (6 ft 1 in)

Sport
- Country: China
- Sport: Badminton
- Handedness: Left
- Retired: 26 November 2024

Men's singles
- Highest ranking: 11 (17 January 2023)
- BWF profile
Medal record
Men's badminton
Representing China
World Championships
Bronze medal – third place	2022 Tokyo	Men's singles
Asia Mixed Team Championships
Gold medal – first place	2019 Hong Kong	Mixed team
Gold medal – first place	2023 Dubai	Mixed team
Bronze medal – third place	2017 Ho Chi Minh	Mixed team
Asia Team Championships
Silver medal – second place	2018 Alor Setar	Men's team
World Junior Championships
Gold medal – first place	2014 Alor Setar	Mixed team
Bronze medal – third place	2013 Bangkok	Boys' singles
Bronze medal – third place	2013 Bangkok	Mixed team
Bronze medal – third place	2014 Alor Setar	Boys' singles
Asian Junior Championships
Gold medal – first place	2013 Kota Kinabalu	Mixed team
Gold medal – first place	2014 Taipei	Mixed team
Bronze medal – third place	2014 Taipei	Boys' singles

Zhao Junpeng (Chinese: 赵俊鹏; pinyin: Zhào Jùnpéng, born 2 February 1996) is a Chinese badminton player. In 2016 and 2017, he became the runner-up at the China International Challenge tournament in the men's singles event. He won his first senior international title at the 2016 Macau Open Grand Prix Gold where he defeated Chou Tien-chen of Chinese Taipei in straight games in the final. In 2023, he helped the national team win the Asia Mixed Team Championships.

In November 2024, Zhao announced his retirement on social media.

== Achievements ==
=== BWF World Championships ===
Men's singles
Year	Venue	Opponent	Score	Result
2022	Tokyo Metropolitan Gymnasium; Tokyo, Japan	(Thailand) Kunlavut Vitidsarn	20–22, 6–21	Bronze

=== BWF World Junior Championships ===
Boys' singles
Year	Venue	Opponent	Score	Result
2013	Hua Mark Indoor Stadium; Bangkok, Thailand	(Chinese Taipei) Wang Tzu-wei	12–21, 16–21	Bronze
2014	Stadium Sultan Abdul Halim; Alor Setar, Malaysia	(China) Lin Guipu	12–21, 19–21	Bronze

=== Asian Junior Championships ===
Boys' singles
Year	Venue	Opponent	Score	Result
2014	Taipei Gymnasium; Taipei, Taiwan	(Japan) Kanta Tsuneyama	9–21, 18–21	Bronze

=== BWF World Tour (1 runner-up) ===
The BWF World Tour, which was announced on 19 March 2017 and implemented in 2018, is a series of elite badminton tournaments sanctioned by the Badminton World Federation (BWF). The BWF World Tours are divided into levels of World Tour Finals, Super 1000, Super 750, Super 500, Super 300 (part of the HSBC World Tour), and the BWF Tour Super 100.

Men's singles
Year	Tournament	Level	Opponent	Score	Result
2022	Indonesia Open	Super 1000	(Denmark) Viktor Axelsen	9–21, 10–21	(silver) Runner-up

=== BWF Grand Prix (1 title) ===
The BWF Grand Prix had two levels, the BWF Grand Prix and Grand Prix Gold. It was a series of badminton tournaments sanctioned by the Badminton World Federation (BWF) held from 2007 to 2017.

Men's singles
Year	Tournament	Opponent	Score	Result
2016	Macau Open	(Chinese Taipei) Chou Tien-chen	21–11, 21–19	(gold) Winner

BWF Grand Prix Gold tournament
BWF Grand Prix tournament

=== BWF International Challenge/Series (2 runners-up) ===
Men's singles
Year	Tournament	Opponent	Score	Result
2016	China International	(China) Lin Guipu	7–21, 20–22	(silver) Runner-up
2017	China International	(China) Sun Feixiang	9–11, 7–11, 11–13	(silver) Runner-up

BWF International Challenge tournament
BWF International Series tournament

== Record against selected opponents ==
Record against year-end Finals finalists, World Championships semi-finalists, and Olympic quarter-finalists. Accurate as of 11 April 2023.

Player	Matches	Win	Lost	Diff.
(China) Lin Dan	2	1	1	0
(China) Shi Yuqi	6	0	6	–6
(Chinese Taipei) Chou Tien-chen	2	1	1	0
(Denmark) Anders Antonsen	1	0	1	–1
(Denmark) Viktor Axelsen	6	1	5	–4
(Denmark) Hans-Kristian Vittinghus	2	2	0	+2
(India) Parupalli Kashyap	1	0	1	–1
(India) Srikanth Kidambi	3	2	1	+1
(India) B. Sai Praneeth	2	2	0	+2
(India) Lakshya Sen	1	0	1	–1

Player	Matches	Win	Lost	Diff.
(Indonesia) Anthony Sinisuka Ginting	4	1	3	–2
(Indonesia) Sony Dwi Kuncoro	2	2	0	+2
(Indonesia) Tommy Sugiarto	1	0	1	–1
(Japan) Kento Momota	1	1	0	+1
(Malaysia) Liew Daren	3	0	3	–3
(Singapore) Loh Kean Yew	5	2	3	–1
(South Korea) Heo Kwang-hee	5	3	2	+1
(South Korea) Son Wan-ho	2	0	2	–2
(Thailand) Kunlavut Vitidsarn	2	0	2	–2
(Thailand) Kantaphon Wangcharoen	2	1	1	0
(Vietnam) Nguyễn Tiến Minh	1	1	0	+1
