= Cheam June Wei =

Malaysian badminton player (born 1997)

Cheam June Wei 詹俊为
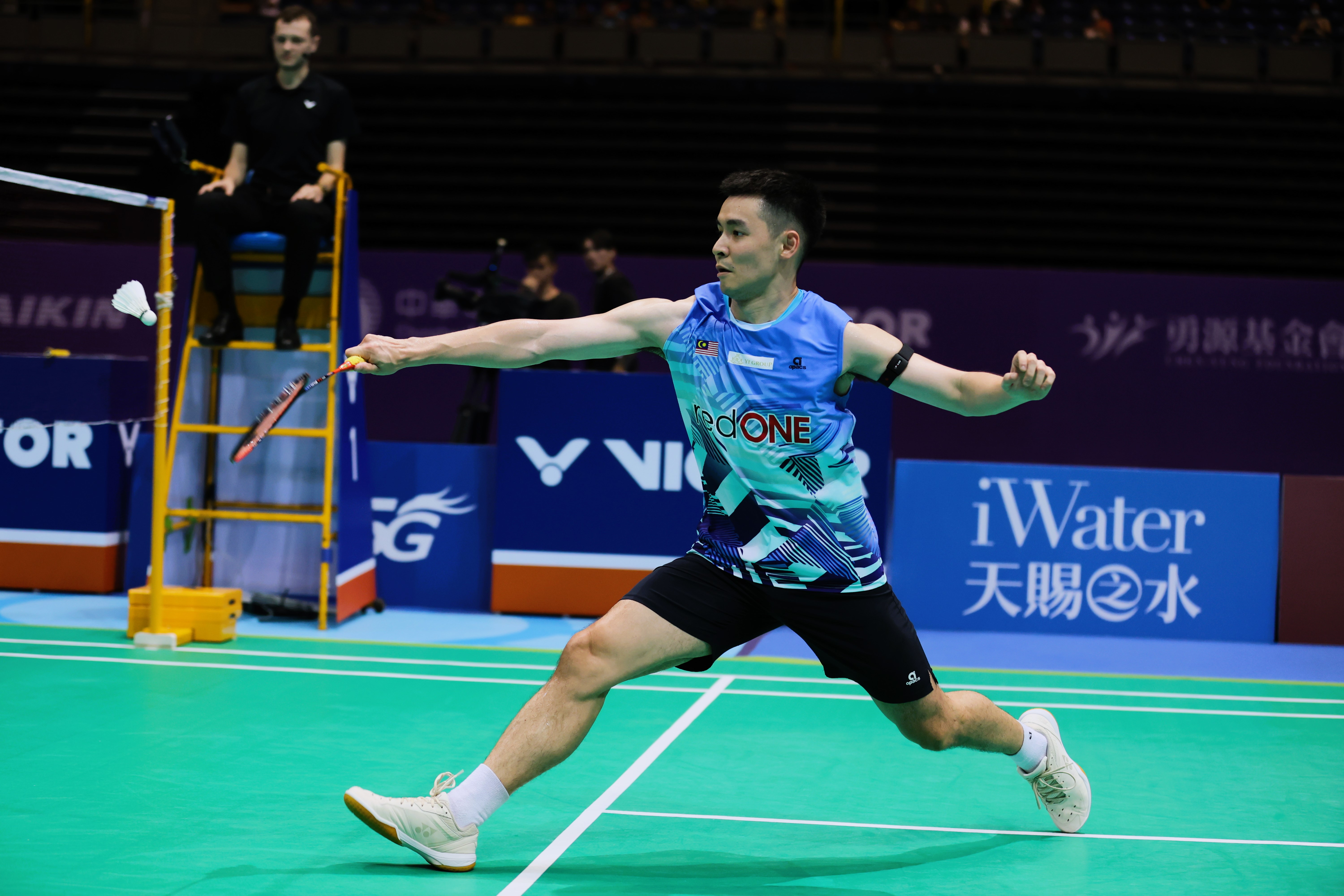
- Cheam at the 2024 Kaohsiung Masters

Personal information
- Born: 23 January 1997 (age 29) Seberang Jaya, Penang, Malaysia
- Years active: 2014–present
- Height: 1.74 m (5 ft 9 in)
- Weight: 65 kg (143 lb)

Sport
- Country: Malaysia
- Sport: Badminton
- Handedness: Right
- Coached by: Ong Ewe Hock

Men's singles
- Career record: 202 wins, 137 losses
- Highest ranking: 41 (21 March 2023)
- Current ranking: 56 (3 November 2026)
- BWF profile
Medal record
Men's badminton
Representing Malaysia
Thomas Cup
Bronze medal – third place	2024 Chengdu	Men's team
Asia Team Championships
Silver medal – second place	2020 Manila	Men's team
Asia Junior Championships
Bronze medal – third place	2012 Gimcheon	Mixed team
Representing (International Olympic Committee) Mixed-NOCs
Youth Olympic Games
Gold medal – first place	2014 Nanjing	Mixed doubles

Cheam June Wei
- Traditional Chinese: 詹俊為
- Simplified Chinese: 詹俊为
Transcriptions
Standard Mandarin
- Hanyu Pinyin: Zhān Jùnwéi
Yue: Cantonese
- Jyutping: Zim1 Zeon3 Wai4
Southern Min
- Hokkien POJ: Chiam Chùn-ûi
- Tâi-lô: Tsiam Tsùn-uî

Cheam June Wei (simplified Chinese: 詹俊为; traditional Chinese: 詹俊為; pinyin: Zhān Jùnwéi, born 23 January 1997) is a Malaysian badminton player. A Youth Olympic gold medalist and five-time Lin Dan Cup champion, he won the mixed doubles gold medal at the 2014 Summer Youth Olympics in Nanjing alongside Ng Tsz Yau of Hong Kong. Their victory was achieved in a mixed-nationality event, with the medal credited to the Mixed-NOCs team rather than Malaysia or Hong Kong individually. He also contributed to Malaysia's bronze medal at the 2024 Thomas Cup and silver medal at the 2020 Badminton Asia Team Championships.

At senior level, Cheam reached three BWF World Tour Super 100 men's singles finals, finishing runners-up at the 2018 Dutch Open, 2022 Indonesia Masters and 2024 Kaohsiung Masters. He also won the men's singles titles at the 2018 Dutch International and 2019 Malaysia International.

Outside the BWF World Tour, Cheam has won five men's singles titles at the Lin Dan Cup, an invitational badminton competition associated with two-time Olympic champion Lin Dan. He won the Shenzhen and Macau editions in 2024, the Jincheng edition in 2025, and the Chenzhou and Jincheng editions in 2026. His fifth title, secured in August 2026, made him the second player after China's Zhao Junpeng to win five Lin Dan Cup championships.

== Career ==
Cheam started playing badminton at aged 8 in Penang. As a junior player, he has been trained by Teh Peng Huat, the former coach of world No. 1 Lee Chong Wei, for more than year before training under task Lim Theam Teow.

=== 2012 ===
In July, Cheam won the mixed team bronze medal at the Asia Junior Championships in Gimcheon, South Korea.

=== 2014 ===
In 2014, Cheam was promoted to join the national team from the Bukit Jalil Sports School. In March, he was the runner-up at German Junior. In August, he competed at the 2014 Summer Youth Olympics and clinched the mixed doubles title with his partner from Hong Kong, Ng Tsz Yau. In September, he finished as the runner-up at the 2014 Malaysia International Junior Championships.

=== 2015 ===
In February, Cheam competed at the Dutch Junior and was crowned the champion. He also entered the semi-final of German Junior in March and Indonesia Junior International in September.

=== 2017–2018 ===
In July 2017, Cheam entered his first senior tournament final at the Malaysia International but lost 19–21, 14–21 to Singapore's Loh Kean Yew.

In February 2018, Cheam became the runner-up at the Austrian Open. In April 2018, he fell to compatriot Leong Jun Hao at the Finnish Open final in three games. In the following week, he won his first senior title at the Dutch International. In October 2018, he entered his first BWF World Tour final at the Dutch Open and finished as runner-up.

=== 2019–2020 ===
In June 2019, Cheam lost out to compatriot Soong Joo Ven in the final of Malaysia International Series. In December 2019, he captured his second title at the Malaysia International Challenge beating Ren Pengbo in the final.

Cheam was also part of Malaysia's men's team that won silver at the 2020 Badminton Asia Team Championships.

=== 2021 ===
In September, he was selected as the second men's singles player for the Malaysian men's team that participated in the 2020 Thomas & Uber Cup. In November, he resigned from the national team after six years. In December, he made his debut at the 2021 BWF World Championships but lost in the first round to Kenta Nishimoto.

=== 2022 ===
In September, Cheam competed at the 2022 Vietnam Open but crashed out in the semi-final to Sun Feixiang. In October, he entered his second BWF World Tour final at the Indonesia Masters but lost to compatriot Leong Jun Hao in three games.

=== 2024 ===
In June, Cheam clinched the Lin Dan Cup, organised by the badminton legend himself after defeating China's Ren Chengming in straight sets. With the win, he pocketed a total of 200,000 yuan (approximately RM 131,000) in prize money.

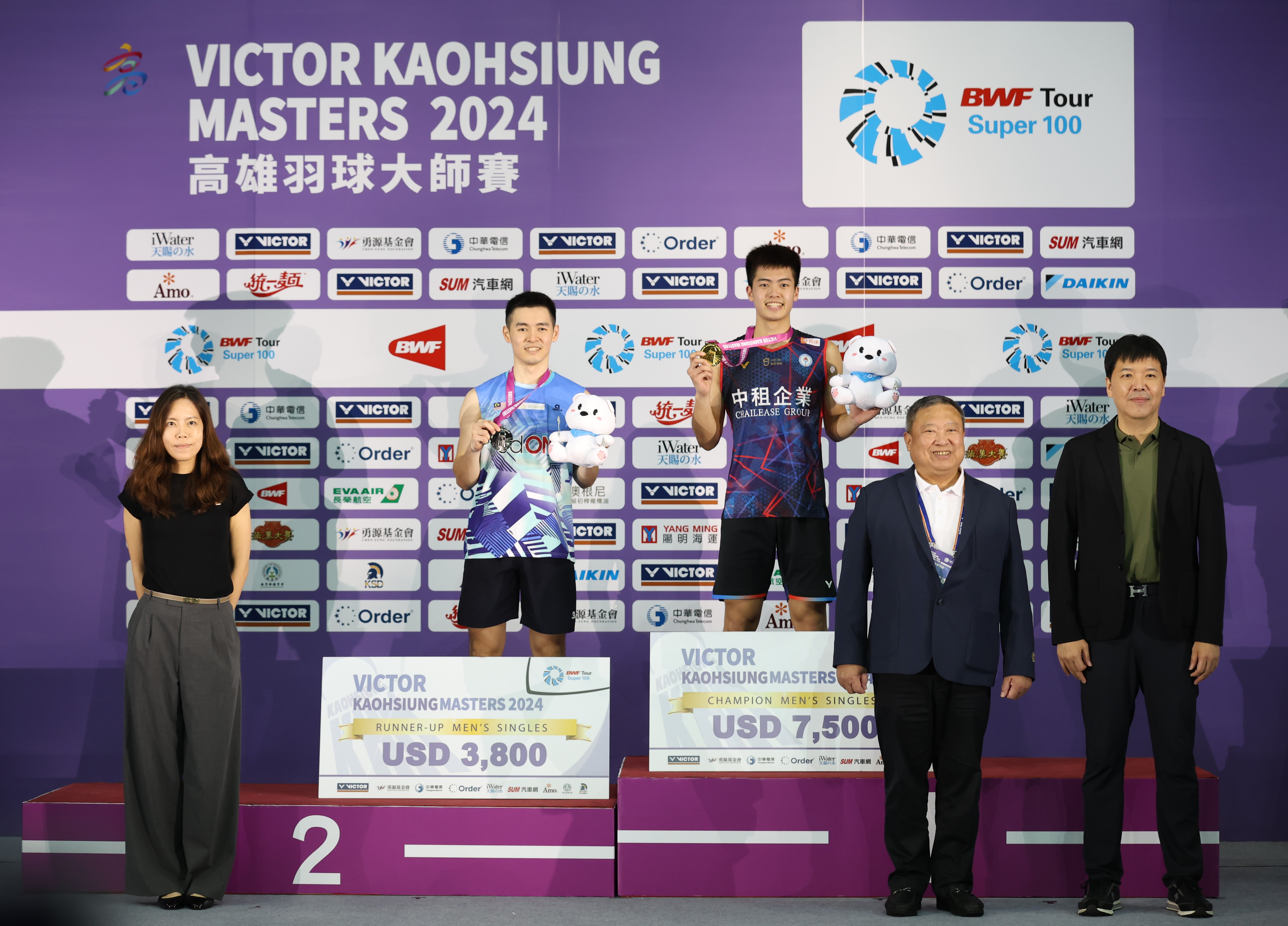
Cheam (second from left) on the 2024 Kaohsiung Masters men's singles podium

The following week, Cheam became the runner-up of 2024 Kaohsiung Masters after losing to Chinese Taipei's Lee Chia-hao in the finals.

In September, Cheam defeated China's Zhou Ze Qi 14–21, 21–6, 21–16 to win the Lin Dan Cup for the second time in Macau.

=== 2025 ===
Cheam became the first to win the Lin Dan Cup three times in August, beating Wu Kai'an 11–15, 15–13, 15–9 in the final in Jincheng, China.

=== 2026 ===
Cheam reached the final of the Azerbaijan International in February. He suffered a hip injury and had to retire in the second game while trailing Poland's Dominik Kwinta 8–21, 1–8.

In June, Cheam missed out on another chance to clinch gold at the Phuket International Challenge after losing to Rei Miyashita from Japan in the rubber set (20–22, 21–14, 12–21).

Cheam won his fourth Lin Dan Cup in July after beating home favourite and former world No. 11 Zhao Jun Peng 15–13, 9–15, 15–13 in the final in Chenzhou, China. Cheam was down and out at 8–13 in the rubber game before scoring seven consecutive points to clinch the title once again. He extended his runs of success in Lin Dan Cup in Jincheng, China again by winning his fifth title, after beating Ren Chengming 15–11, 15–6 in the final on 29 August.

== Achievements ==
=== Youth Olympic Games ===
Mixed doubles
Year	Venue	Partner	Opponent	Score	Result
2014	Nanjing Sport Institute; Nanjing, China	(Hong Kong) Ng Tsz Yau	(Japan) Kanta Tsuneyama (Chinese Taipei) Lee Chia-hsin	21–14, 23–21	Gold

=== BWF World Tour (3 runners-up) ===
The BWF World Tour, which was announced on 19 March 2017 and implemented in 2018, is a series of elite badminton tournaments sanctioned by the Badminton World Federation (BWF). The BWF World Tours are divided into levels of World Tour Finals, Super 1000, Super 750, Super 500, Super 300, and the BWF Tour Super 100.

Men's singles
Year	Tournament	Level	Opponent	Score	Result	Ref.
2018	Dutch Open	Super 100	(India) Sourabh Verma	19–21, 13–21	(silver) Runner-up	
2022	Indonesia Masters	Super 100	(Malaysia) Leong Jun Hao	21–9, 20–22, 19–21	(silver) Runner-up	
2024	Kaohsiung Masters	Super 100	(Chinese Taipei) Lee Chia-hao	15–21, 12–21	(silver) Runner-up	

=== BWF International Challenge/Series (2 titles, 6 runners-up) ===
Men's singles
Year	Tournament	Opponent	Score	Result	Ref.
2017	Malaysia International	(Singapore) Loh Kean Yew	19–21, 14–21	(silver) Runner-up	
2018	Austrian International	(India) Parupalli Kashyap	21–23, 14–21	(silver) Runner-up	
2018	Finnish Open	(Malaysia) Leong Jun Hao	21–12, 17–21, 20–22	(silver) Runner-up	
2018	Dutch International	(Poland) Adrian Dziółko	13–21, 21–13, 21–10	(gold) Winner	
2019	Malaysia International	(Malaysia) Soong Joo Ven	13–21, 20–22	(silver) Runner-up	
2019	Malaysia International	(China) Ren Pengbo	21–16, 19–21, 21–18	(gold) Winner	
2026	Azerbaijan International	(Poland) Dominik Kwinta	8–21, 1–8 (Ret)	(silver) Runner-up	
2026	Phuket International	(Japan) Rei Miyashita	20–22, 21–14, 12–21	(silver) Runner-up	

BWF International Challenge tournament
BWF International Series tournament
