= 2020 SaarLorLux Open =

Badminton tournament in Germany

Tournament details
- Dates: 27 October – 1 November
- Level: Super 100
- Total prize money: US$90,000
- Venue: Saarlandhalle
- Location: Saarbrücken, Germany

Champions
- Men's singles: (France) Toma Junior Popov
- Women's singles: (Scotland) Kirsty Gilmour
- Men's doubles: (Denmark) Jeppe Bay (Denmark) Lasse Mølhede
- Women's doubles: (Bulgaria) Gabriela Stoeva (Bulgaria) Stefani Stoeva
- Mixed doubles: (Denmark) Mathias Christiansen (Denmark) Alexandra Bøje

The 2020 SaarLorLux Open was a badminton tournament which took place at Saarlandhalle in Saarbrücken, Germany, from 27 October to 1 November 2020 and had a total prize of $90,000.

== Tournament ==
The 2020 SaarLorLux Open was the only Super 100 tournament of the 2020 BWF World Tour and also part of the SaarLorLux Open championships, which had been held since 1988. This tournament was organized by German Badminton Association and sanctioned by the BWF.

=== Venue ===
This international tournament was held at Saarlandhalle in Saarbrücken, Saarland, Germany.

=== Point distribution ===
Below is the point distribution table for each phase of the tournament based on the BWF points system for the BWF Tour Super 100 event.

Winner	Runner-up	3/4	5/8	9/16	17/32	33/64	65/128
5,500	4,680	3,850	3,030	2,110	1,290	510	240

=== Prize money ===
The total prize money for this tournament was US$90,000. Distribution of prize money was in accordance with BWF regulations.

Event	Winner	Finals	Semi-finals	Quarter-finals	Last 16
Singles	$6,750	$3,420	$1,305	$540	$315
Doubles	$7,110	$3,420	$1,260	$652.50	$337.50

== Men's singles ==
=== Seeds ===
1. (Denmark) Rasmus Gemke (third round)
2. (India) Lakshya Sen (withdrew)
3. (Netherlands) Mark Caljouw (final)
4. (France) Brice Leverdez (third round)
5. (Denmark) Hans-Kristian Vittinghus (second round)
6. (India) Subhankar Dey (withdrew)
7. (Spain) Pablo Abián (third round)
8. (England) Toby Penty (third round)

=== Finals ===
Semi-finals
(France) Toma Junior Popov	21	21
(Denmark) Ditlev Jæger Holm	17	15
3	(Netherlands) Mark Caljouw	21	21
(Canada) Brian Yang	18	17

Final
(France) Toma Junior Popov	22	19	21
3	(Netherlands) Mark Caljouw	20	21	14

=== Top half ===
==== Section 1 ====
First Round
PFR	(Austria) L Seiwald	9	18
(Denmark) K Bruun	21	21
(Germany) M Weißkirchen	19	21	21
(France) L Claerbout	21	16	19
(Netherlands) J Kweekel	18	16
(France) T J Popov	21	21
(France) T Rouxel	21	21
(Germany) S Hsiao	17	16

Second Round
1	(Denmark) R Gemke	21	17	21
(Denmark) K Bruun	17	21	18
PFR	(Germany) B Holtschke	7	21	20
(Germany) M Weißkirchen	21	14	22
5	(Denmark) H-K Vittinghus	17	19
(France) T J Popov	21	21
(Sweden) F Burestedt	19	21	8
(France) T Rouxel	21	15	21

Third Round
1	(Denmark) R Gemke	13	25	16
(Germany) M Weißkirchen	21	23	21
(France) T J Popov	21	21
(France) T Rouxel	14	8

Quarter-finals
(Germany) M Weißkirchen	22	7	18
(France) T J Popov	20	21	21

==== Section 2 ====
First Round
(Republic of Ireland) J Dolan	24	22	21
PFR	(Denmark) M Bundgaard	26	20	17
(Denmark) M Christophersen	21	21
PFR	(Belgium) J Carraggi	10	14
(Denmark) J Bruun	21	21
PFR	(Sweden) A C Hjelm	12	18
(Sweden) J Nilsson	9	9
(Denmark) D J Holm	21	21

Second Round
4	(France) B Leverdez	21	21	21
(Republic of Ireland) J Dolan	17	23	14
(Slovakia) M Dratva	12	19
(Denmark) M Christophersen	21	21
7	(Spain) P Abián	21	18	21
(Denmark) J Bruun	12	21	14
(England) A Lane	16	13
(Denmark) D J Holm	21	21

Third Round
4	(France) B Leverdez	21	19	22
(Denmark) M Christophersen	13	21	24
7	(Spain) P Abián	21	18	16
(Denmark) D J Holm	19	21	21

Quarter-finals
(Denmark) M Christophersen	15	9
(Denmark) D J Holm	21	21

=== Bottom half ===
==== Section 3 ====
First Round
PFR	(Portugal) D N Anjo	12	21	8
(Switzerland) J König	21	15	21
(Germany) K Schäfer	19	19
(France) L Corvée	21	21
(France) A Merklé	21	21
(Canada) B. R. Sankeerth	8	9
(India) A Jayaram	21	21
(Belgium) M Moreels	8	8

Second Round
(Switzerland) J König	12	15
PFR	(Bulgaria) I Rusev	21	21
(France) L Corvée	21	8	19
8	(England) T Penty	19	21	21
(France) A Merklé	21	11	21
(Republic of Ireland) N Nguyen	14	21	23
(India) A Jayaram
3	(Netherlands) M Caljouw	w	/	o

Third Round
PFR	(Bulgaria) I Rusev	5	21	21
8	(England) T Penty	21	14	17
(Republic of Ireland) N Nguyen	21	13	14
3	(Netherlands) M Caljouw	19	21	21

Quarter-finals
PFR	(Bulgaria) I Rusev	7	6
3	(Netherlands) M Caljouw	21	21

==== Section 4 ====
First Round
(Denmark) K R Rajarajan	14	12
(Denmark) V Svendsen	21	21
(Switzerland) C Kirchmayr	21	17	7
(Canada) B Yang	16	21	21
(Switzerland) T Künzi	19	21	21
(Belgium) E Bracke	21	17	9
(Italy) F Caponio	19	21
(United States) H Shu	21	23

Second Round
(Denmark) V Svendsen	19	21	21
(Spain) L E Peñalver	21	11	15
(Canada) B Yang	w	/	o
6	(India) S Dey
(Switzerland) T Künzi	w	/	o
(Czech Republic) M Ludík
(United States) H Shu	w	/	o
2	(India) L Sen

Third Round
(Denmark) V Svendsen	21	15	19
(Canada) B Yang	12	21	21
(Switzerland) T Künzi	21	21
(United States) H Shu	19	18

Quarter-finals
(Canada) B Yang	21	18	21
(Switzerland) T Künzi	16	21	17

== Women's singles ==
=== Seeds ===
1. (Spain) Carolina Marín (semi-finals)
2. (Denmark) Mia Blichfeldt (withdrew)
3. (Scotland) Kirsty Gilmour (champion)
4. (Denmark) Line Kjærsfeldt (semi-finals)
5. (France) Qi Xuefei (quarter-finals)
6. (Germany) Yvonne Li (final)
7. (Belgium) Lianne Tan (quarter-finals)
8. (Denmark) Julie Dawall Jakobsen (quarter-finals)

=== Finals ===
Semi-finals
1	(Spain) Carolina Marín	20	14
3	(Scotland) Kirsty Gilmour	22	21
4	(Denmark) Line Kjærsfeldt	21	21	15
6	(Germany) Yvonne Li	13	23	21

Final
3	(Scotland) Kirsty Gilmour	21	21
6	(Germany) Yvonne Li	10	17

=== Top half ===
==== Section 1 ====
First Round
1	(Spain) C Marín	21	21
PFR	(Bulgaria) H Popovska	9	6
(Germany) F Deprez	21	22
(Germany) M Wilson	12	20
5	(France) Qi XF	21	21
(France) Y Hoyaux	9	12
(Denmark) A Schulz	14	19
(Wales) J Hart	21	21

Second Round
1	(Spain) C Marín	21	21
(Germany) F Deprez	15	9
5	(France) Qi XF	21	21
(Wales) J Hart	17	11

Quarter-finals
1	(Spain) C Marín	21	21
5	(France) Qi XF	12	18

==== Section 2 ====
First Round
3	(Scotland) K Gilmour	21	13	21
(Denmark) L Christophersen	14	21	18
(Bulgaria) L Zetchiri	21	21
PFR	(Belgium) C Lassaux	4	15
7	(Belgium) L Tan	13	21	21
(Denmark) I A Andersen	21	16	9
(Mauritius) K Foo Kune	21	19	11
(Switzerland) S Jaquet	16	21	21

Second Round
3	(Scotland) K Gilmour	21	21
(Bulgaria) L Zetchiri	10	10
7	(Belgium) L Tan	21	3	21
(Switzerland) S Jaquet	17	21	19

Quarter-finals
3	(Scotland) K Gilmour	15	21	21
7	(Belgium) L Tan	21	17	8

=== Bottom half ===
==== Section 3 ====
First Round
PFR	(Republic of Ireland) K Frost	24	12
(Poland) W Dąbczyńska	26	21
PFR	(Denmark) A Fuglsang	7	10
8	(Denmark) J D Jakobsen	21	21
(Slovakia) M Repiská	21	21
PFR	(Estonia) H Pajuste	9	7
(Czech Republic) T Švábíková	16	11
4	(Denmark) L Kjærsfeldt	21	21

Second Round
(Poland) W Dąbczyńska	21	17	11
8	(Denmark) J D Jakobsen	15	21	21
(Slovakia) M Repiská	14	10
4	(Denmark) L Kjærsfeldt	21	21

Quarter-finals
8	(Denmark) J D Jakobsen	13	18
4	(Denmark) L Kjærsfeldt	21	21

==== Section 4 ====
First Round
(Estonia) K Kuuba	21	21
(India) M Bansod	12	19
(Netherlands) S de Visch Eijbergen	17	16
6	(Germany) Y Li	21	21
(Czech Republic) K Tomalová	11	21	14
PFR	(Republic of Ireland) R Darragh	21	6	21
PFR	(Spain) B Corrales	22	21
PFR	(Germany) A-K Spöri	20	17

Second Round
(Estonia) K Kuuba	15	8
6	(Germany) Y Li	21	21
PFR	(Republic of Ireland) R Darragh	18	25
PFR	(Spain) B Corrales	21	27

Quarter-finals
6	(Germany) Y Li	21	21
PFR	(Spain) B Corrales	18	14

== Men's doubles ==
=== Seeds ===
1. (Denmark) Kim Astrup / Anders Skaarup Rasmussen (withdrew)
2. (Germany) Mark Lamsfuß / Marvin Emil Seidel (first round)
3. (England) Ben Lane / Sean Vendy (withdrew)
4. (Scotland) Alexander Dunn / Adam Hall (quarter-finals)
5. (Germany) Jones Ralfy Jansen / Peter Käsbauer (semi-finals)
6. (Scotland) Christopher Grimley / Matthew Grimley (first round)
7. (France) Eloi Adam / Julien Maio (quarter-finals)
8. (Denmark) Daniel Lundgaard / Mathias Thyrri (final)

=== Finals ===
Semi-finals
5	(Germany) Jones Ralfy Jansen (Germany) Peter Käsbauer	21	18	18
8	(Denmark) Daniel Lundgaard (Denmark) Mathias Thyrri	12	21	21
(Denmark) Jeppe Bay (Denmark) Lasse Mølhede	22	20	21
(Netherlands) Ruben Jille (Netherlands) Ties van der Lecq	20	22	18

Final
8	(Denmark) Daniel Lundgaard (Denmark) Mathias Thyrri	13	15
(Denmark) Jeppe Bay (Denmark) Lasse Mølhede	21	21

=== Top half ===
==== Section 1 ====
First Round
PFR	(Germany) D Hess (Germany) J Pistorius	21	21
(Italy) G Greco (Italy) K Strobl	10	16
(Denmark) M Christiansen (Denmark) N Nøhr	23	14
(Denmark) A Søndergaard (Denmark) J Toft	25	21
5	(Germany) J R Jansen (Germany) P Käsbauer	21	21
(France) S Corvée (France) K Lovang	17	12
(Netherlands) W van der Aar (Netherlands) B Wassink	21	12	12
(Germany) M Datko (Germany) P Scheiel	18	21	21

Second Round
PFR	(Germany) D Hess (Germany) J Pistorius	17	20
(Denmark) A Søndergaard (Denmark) J Toft	21	22
5	(Germany) J R Jansen (Germany) P Käsbauer	21	21
(Germany) M Datko (Germany) P Scheiel	7	13

Quarter-finals
(Denmark) A Søndergaard (Denmark) J Toft	8	21	14
5	(Germany) J R Jansen (Germany) P Käsbauer	21	16	21

==== Section 2 ====
First Round
4	(Scotland) A Dunn (Scotland) A Hall	21	21
(Austria) P Birker (Austria) D Stipsits	12	15
PFR	(Poland) M Matusz (Poland) W Trecki	21	21
(Germany) T Fuchs (Germany) T Specht	10	17
8	(Denmark) D Lundgaard (Denmark) M Thyrri	21	21
(Germany) F Hammes (Germany) C Klauer	14	13
(Denmark) R Espersen (Denmark) E Hybel	23	16	18
(England) Z Russ (England) S Stallwood	21	21	21

Second Round
4	(Scotland) A Dunn (Scotland) A Hall	21	21
PFR	(Poland) M Matusz (Poland) W Trecki	11	10
8	(Denmark) D Lundgaard (Denmark) M Thyrri	21	21
(England) Z Russ (England) S Stallwood	14	12

Quarter-finals
4	(Scotland) A Dunn (Scotland) A Hall	21	19	20
8	(Denmark) D Lundgaard (Denmark) M Thyrri	15	21	22

=== Bottom half ===
==== Section 3 ====
First Round
(Poland) P Śmiłowski (Poland) P Szydłowski	17	11
(Denmark) J Bay (Denmark) L Mølhede	21	21
PFR	(France) F Delrue (France) W Villeger	21	21
6	(Scotland) C Grimley (Scotland) M Grimley	14	19
(England) R Easton (England) E van Leeuwen	21	19	14
(France) L Corvée (France) B Leverdez	14	21	21
(England) M Clare (England) M Flynn	21	21
PFR	(Luxembourg) K Hargiono (Luxembourg) L Hölzmer	8	7

Second Round
(Denmark) J Bay (Denmark) L Mølhede	25	21
PFR	(France) F Delrue (France) W Villeger	23	17
(France) L Corvée (France) B Leverdez	21	12	21
(England) M Clare (England) M Flynn	15	21	18

Quarter-finals
(Denmark) J Bay (Denmark) L Mølhede	21	21
(France) L Corvée (France) B Leverdez	13	15

==== Section 4 ====
First Round
(France) M Briot (Belgium) J van Nieuwkerke	21	22
PFR	(Bulgaria) I Rusev (Bulgaria) I Stoynov	17	20
(Italy) G Bailetti (Italy) D Salutt	9	13
7	(France) E Adam (France) J Maio	21	21
(Denmark) E Lauritzen (Denmark) M Muurholm	21	18	11
(Republic of Ireland) J Magee (Republic of Ireland) P Reynolds	19	21	21
(Netherlands) R Jille (Netherlands) T van der Lecq	21	16	21
2	(Germany) M Lamsfuß (Germany) M E Seidel	13	21	13

Second Round
(France) M Briot (Belgium) J van Nieuwkerke	16	10
7	(France) E Adam (France) J Maio	21	21
(Republic of Ireland) J Magee (Republic of Ireland) P Reynolds	19	20
(Netherlands) R Jille (Netherlands) T van der Lecq	21	22

Quarter-finals
7	(France) E Adam (France) J Maio	21	24	14
(Netherlands) R Jille (Netherlands) T van der Lecq	19	26	21

== Women's doubles ==
=== Seeds ===
1. (Bulgaria) Gabriela Stoeva / Stefani Stoeva (champions)
2. (Denmark) Maiken Fruergaard / Sara Thygesen (semi-finals)
3. (France) Émilie Lefel / Anne Tran (quarter-finals)
4. (Germany) Linda Efler / Isabel Herttrich (quarter-finals)
5. (Denmark) Alexandra Bøje / Mette Poulsen (quarter-finals)
6. (Denmark) Amalie Magelund / Freja Ravn (final)
7. (England) Jenny Moore / Victoria Williams (withdrew)
8. (Netherlands) Debora Jille / Cheryl Seinen (semi-finals)

=== Finals ===
Semi-finals
1	(Bulgaria) Gabriela Stoeva (Bulgaria) Stefani Stoeva	21	21
8	(Netherlands) Debora Jille (Netherlands) Cheryl Seinen	8	17
6	(Denmark) Amalie Magelund (Denmark) Freja Ravn	21	21
2	(Denmark) Maiken Fruergaard (Denmark) Sara Thygesen	12	17

Final
1	(Bulgaria) Gabriela Stoeva (Bulgaria) Stefani Stoeva	21	21
6	(Denmark) Amalie Magelund (Denmark) Freja Ravn	8	11

=== Top half ===
==== Section 1 ====
First Round
(Czech Republic) A Bášová (Czech Republic) M Fuchsová	21	16	12
(Denmark) N P. Anthonisen (Denmark) C Graversen	15	21	21
(Germany) A Jäger (Germany) S Küspert	17	15
(Germany) K Ostermeyer (Germany) F Volkmann	21	21

Second Round
1	(Bulgaria) G Stoeva (Bulgaria) S Stoeva	18	21	21
(Denmark) N P. Anthonisen (Denmark) C Graversen	21	6	14
5	(Denmark) A Bøje (Denmark) M Poulsen	7	21	21
(Germany) K Ostermeyer (Germany) F Volkmann	21	12	15

Quarter-finals
1	(Bulgaria) G Stoeva (Bulgaria) S Stoeva	21	21
5	(Denmark) A Bøje (Denmark) M Poulsen	13	15

==== Section 2 ====
First Round
(Switzerland) A Müller (Switzerland) J Stadelmann
(Luxembourg) K Schmidt (Luxembourg) Z Sinico	w	/	o
8	(Netherlands) D Jille (Netherlands) C Seinen	21	14	21
(Estonia) K-K Marran (Estonia) H Rüütel	14	21	10
(Austria) S Au Yeong (Austria) K Hochmeir	12	15
(Denmark) C Busch (Denmark) A Schulz	21	21

Second Round
3	(France) É Lefel (France) A Tran	w	/	o
(Luxembourg) K Schmidt (Luxembourg) Z Sinico
8	(Netherlands) D Jille (Netherlands) C Seinen	21	22
(Denmark) C Busch (Denmark) A Schulz	11	20

Quarter-finals
3	(France) É Lefel (France) A Tran	19	18
8	(Netherlands) D Jille (Netherlands) C Seinen	21	21

=== Bottom half ===
==== Section 3 ====
First Round
(Poland) D Kwaśnik (Poland) M Świerczyńska	21	14	15
(Republic of Ireland) K Frost (Republic of Ireland) M Ryan	12	21	21
(Netherlands) A Tirtosentono (Netherlands) I van der Aar	16	21	13
6	(Denmark) A Magelund (Denmark) F Ravn	21	19	21
(France) V Hériau (France) M Lambert	21	21
(Belgium) L Jaques (Germany) H Pohl	10	17

Second Round
(Republic of Ireland) K Frost (Republic of Ireland) M Ryan	6	9
6	(Denmark) A Magelund (Denmark) F Ravn	21	21
(France) V Hériau (France) M Lambert	20	13
4	(Germany) L Efler (Germany) I Herttrich	22	21

Quarter-finals
6	(Denmark) A Magelund (Denmark) F Ravn	22	21
4	(Germany) L Efler (Germany) I Herttrich	20	15

==== Section 4 ====
First Round
(Denmark) J Finne-Ipsen (Denmark) M Surrow
(Scotland) E O'Donnell (Scotland) S Sidebottom	w	/	o
(Scotland) J MacPherson (Scotland) C Torrance	18	12
(Sweden) C Nistad (Sweden) M Sjöö	21	21

Second Round
(Scotland) E O'Donnell (Scotland) S Sidebottom	w	/	o
7	(England) J Moore (England) V Williams
(Sweden) C Nistad (Sweden) M Sjöö	16	24	16
2	(Denmark) M Fruergaard (Denmark) S Thygesen	21	22	21

Quarter-finals
(Scotland) E O'Donnell (Scotland) S Sidebottom	9	12
2	(Denmark) M Fruergaard (Denmark) S Thygesen	21	21

== Mixed doubles ==
=== Seeds ===
1. (France) Thom Gicquel / Delphine Delrue (withdrew)
2. (Netherlands) Robin Tabeling / Selena Piek (semi-finals)
3. (Germany) Mark Lamsfuß / Isabel Herttrich (final)
4. (Denmark) Mathias Christiansen / Alexandra Bøje (champions)
5. (France) Ronan Labar / Anne Tran (semi-finals)
6. (Scotland) Adam Hall / Julie MacPherson (second round)
7. (Denmark) Mathias Thyrri / Mai Surrow (withdrew)
8. (Germany) Bjarne Geiss / Linda Efler (quarter-finals)

=== Finals ===
Semi-finals
5	(France) Ronan Labar (France) Anne Tran	13	17
3	(Germany) Mark Lamsfuß (Germany) Isabel Herttrich	21	21
4	(Denmark) Mathias Christiansen (Denmark) Alexandra Bøje	21	21
2	(Netherlands) Robin Tabeling (Netherlands) Selena Piek	19	16

Final
3	(Germany) Mark Lamsfuß (Germany) Isabel Herttrich	15	21	11
4	(Denmark) Mathias Christiansen (Denmark) Alexandra Bøje	21	19	21

=== Top half ===
==== Section 1 ====
First Round
PFR	(Scotland) M Grimley (Scotland) S Sidebottom	13	18
(Netherlands) W van der Aar (Netherlands) C Seinen	21	21
(Austria) P Birker (Austria) K Hochmeir	24	17	22
(Scotland) A Dunn (Scotland) C Torrance	22	21	20
5	(France) R Labar (France) A Tran	21	12	21
(Germany) P Scheiel (Germany) A Jäger	6	21	6
(Netherlands) B Wassink (Netherlands) A Tirtosentono	19	21	21
(Austria) D Stipsits (Austria) S Au Yeong	21	18	17

Second Round
(Netherlands) W van der Aar (Netherlands) C Seinen	17	21	21
(Austria) P Birker (Austria) K Hochmeir	21	12	16
5	(France) R Labar (France) A Tran	21	21
(Netherlands) B Wassink (Netherlands) A Tirtosentono	9	15

Quarter-finals
(Netherlands) W van der Aar (Netherlands) C Seinen	16	9
5	(France) R Labar (France) A Tran	21	21

==== Section 2 ====
First Round
3	(Germany) M Lamsfuß (Germany) I Herttrich	21	21
(Belgium) J van Nieuwkerke (Belgium) L Jaques	14	17
(Netherlands) T van der Lecq (Netherlands) D Jille	17	20
(Denmark) R Espersen (Denmark) C Busch	21	22
8	(Germany) B Geiss (Germany) L Efler	21	21
(Denmark) E Lauritzen (Denmark) I Bergstein	13	14
(Germany) J R Jansen (Germany) K Ostermeyer	21	22
(Denmark) M Mikkelsen (Denmark) R Søby Hansen	13	20

Second Round
3	(Germany) M Lamsfuß (Germany) I Herttrich	21	21
(Denmark) R Espersen (Denmark) C Busch	7	9
8	(Germany) B Geiss (Germany) L Efler	22	13	21
(Germany) J R Jansen (Germany) K Ostermeyer	20	21	11

Quarter-finals
3	(Germany) M Lamsfuß (Germany) I Herttrich	21	21
8	(Germany) B Geiss (Germany) L Efler	12	17

=== Bottom half ===
==== Section 3 ====
First Round
(Denmark) N Nøhr (Denmark) A Magelund	21	21
(Scotland) C Grimley (Scotland) E O'Donnell	15	18
(Denmark) J Bay (Denmark) S Lundgaard	16	21	12
6	(Scotland) A Hall (Scotland) J MacPherson	21	7	21
(Finland) A Kaisti (Czech Republic) A Bášová	21	22
(Estonia) M Laanes (Estonia) H Rüütel	12	20
(France) W Villeger (France) S Bauer	13	21	13
4	(Denmark) M Christiansen (Denmark) A Bøje	21	19	21

Second Round
(Denmark) N Nøhr (Denmark) A Magelund	21	21	21
6	(Scotland) A Hall (Scotland) J MacPherson	15	23	15
(Finland) A Kaisti (Czech Republic) A Bášová	13	12
4	(Denmark) M Christiansen (Denmark) A Bøje	21	21

Quarter-finals
(Denmark) N Nøhr (Denmark) A Magelund	12	16
4	(Denmark) M Christiansen (Denmark) A Bøje	21	21

==== Section 4 ====
First Round
(France) E Adam (France) M Lambert	21	20	13
(Poland) P Szydłowski (Poland) W Adamek	18	22	21
(Republic of Ireland) P Reynolds (Republic of Ireland) R Darragh	18	21	21
PFR	(Poland) W Trecki (Poland) D Kwasnik	21	13	11
PFR	(Netherlands) R Jille (Netherlands) I van der Aar	21	21
(France) F Delrue (France) V Hériau	11	12
(Poland) P Śmiłowski (Poland) M Świerczyńska	16	3
2	(Netherlands) R Tabeling (Netherlands) S Piek	21	21

Second Round
(Poland) P Szydłowski (Poland) W Adamek	21	21
(Republic of Ireland) P Reynolds (Republic of Ireland) R Darragh	14	16
PFR	(Netherlands) R Jille (Netherlands) I van der Aar	16	10
2	(Netherlands) R Tabeling (Netherlands) S Piek	21	21

Quarter-finals
(Poland) P Szydłowski (Poland) W Adamek	9	11
2	(Netherlands) R Tabeling (Netherlands) S Piek	21	21

Preceded by French Open (original); Denmark Open (eventual)	BWF World Tour; 2020 BWF season	Succeeded by Fuzhou China Open (original); Yonex Thailand Open (eventual)
