= 2018 European Junior Badminton Championships – Mixed doubles =

Tournament details
- Dates: 11 – 16 September 2018
- Edition: 26
- Venue: Kalev Sports Hall
- Location: Tallinn, Estonia

The Mixed Doubles tournament of the 2018 European Junior Badminton Championships was held from September 11-16. Russian pair Rodion Alimov and Alina Davletova clinched this title in the last edition. Ian Spiller / Petra Polanc from Slovenia leads the seedings this year.

== Seeded ==
1. (Slovenia) Ian Spiller / Petra Polanc (third round)
2. (Bulgaria) Iliyan Stoynov / Hristomira Popovska (fourth round)
3. (Denmark) Sebastian Gronbjerg / Amalie Magelund (third round)
4. (Netherlands) Gijs Duijs / Madouc Linders (second round)
5. (England) Ethan Van Leeuwen / Sian Kelly (quarter-finals)
6. (Russia) Georgii Karpov / Anastasiia Kurdyukova (fourth round)
7. (Germany) Lukas Resch / Emma Moszczynski (semi-finals)
8. (Netherlands) Ties van der Lecq / Milou Lugters (second round)
9. (Sweden) Melker Z-Bexell / Tilda Sjoo (fourth round)
10. (France) William Villeger / Ainoa Desmons (third round)
11. (England) Rory Easton / Hope Warner (quarter-finals)
12. (Belgium) Jona van Nieuwkerke / Joke de Langhe (withdrew)
13. (France) Fabien Delrue / Juliette Moinard (champions)
14. (Russia) Egor Kholkin / Anastasiia Pustinskaia (fourth round)
15. (Romania) Daniel Popescu / Loredana Lungu (third round)
16. (Ukraine) Danylo Bosniuk / Valyeriya Masaylo (third round)

== Draw ==
=== Finals ===
Quarterfinals
(Germany) Matthias Kicklitz (Germany) Thuc Phuong Nguyen	21	16	19
(Denmark) Mads Vestergaard (Denmark) Christine Busch	19	21	21
13	(France) Fabien Delrue (France) Juliette Moinard	21	21
5	(England) Ethan Van Leeuwen (England) Sian Kelly	12	11
(Netherlands) Wessel van der Aar (Netherlands) Alyssa Tirtosentono	21	12	22
(France) Maxime Briot (France) Sharone Bauer	18	21	20
7	(Germany) Lukas Resch (Germany) Emma Moszczynski	21	21
11	(England) Rory Easton (England) Hope Warner	18	14

Semifinals
(Denmark) Mads Vestergaard (Denmark) Christine Busch	19	17
13	(France) Fabien Delrue (France) Juliette Moinard	21	21
(Netherlands) Wessel van der Aar (Netherlands) Alyssa Tirtosentono	21	15	21
7	(Germany) Lukas Resch (Germany) Emma Moszczynski	17	21	13

Final
13	(France) Fabien Delrue (France) Juliette Moinard	21	21
(Netherlands) Wessel van der Aar (Netherlands) Alyssa Tirtosentono	16	16

=== Top half ===
==== Section 1 ====
First round
(Germany) M Kicklitz (Germany) T P Nguyen	21	21
(Cyprus) O Pissis (Cyprus) I Pissi	9	7

Second round
1	(Slovenia) I Spiller (Slovenia) P Polanc	21	12	24
(Czech Republic) T Svejda (Czech Republic) L Krpatova	15	21	22
(Italy) S Koellemann (Italy) L Sagmeister	21	21
(Norway) T Ellingsen (Norway) M Christensen	17	16
(Belgium) J van Nieuwkerke (Wales) A Whiteman	21	21
(Bulgaria) D Nenchev (Bulgaria) G Pavlova	19	17
(Estonia) T Kilk (Estonia) C Kruus	12	8
(Germany) M Kicklitz (Germany) T P Nguyen	21	21

Third round
1	(Slovenia) I Spiller (Slovenia) P Polanc	19	17
(Italy) S Koellemann (Italy) L Sagmeister	21	21
(Belgium) J van Nieuwkerke (Wales) A Whiteman	17	14
(Germany) M Kicklitz (Germany) T P Nguyen	21	21

Fourth round
(Italy) S Koellemann (Italy) L Sagmeister	15	15
(Germany) M Kicklitz (Germany) T P Nguyen	21	21

==== Section 2 ====
First round
(Finland) J Oldorff (Finland) J Monnberg	19	13
(Slovakia) J Horak (Slovakia) M Tarcalova	21	21
(Iceland) E Sverrisson (Iceland) T Eylands	11	14
(Ukraine) M Makhnovskiy (Ukraine) A Prozorova	21	21

Second round
8	(Netherlands) T van der Lecq (Netherlands) M Lugters	16	21	24
(Denmark) M Vestergaard (Denmark) C Busch	21	17	26
(Russia) L Barinov (Russia) A Boiarun	21	21
(Slovakia) J Horak (Slovakia) M Tarcalova	12	16
9	(Sweden) M Z-Bexell (Sweden) T Sjoo	21	21
(Israel) M Grinblat (Israel) Y Pugach	16	12
(Germany) A Sonnenschein (Germany) L Michalski	17	21	21
(Ukraine) M Makhnovskiy (Ukraine) A Prozorova	21	14	14

Third round
(Denmark) M Vestergaard (Denmark) C Busch	21	21
(Russia) L Barinov (Russia) A Boiarun	18	17
9	(Sweden) M Z-Bexell (Sweden) T Sjoo	26	21
(Germany) A Sonnenschein (Germany) L Michalski	24	12

Fourth round
(Denmark) M Vestergaard (Denmark) C Busch	21	16	21
9	(Sweden) M Z-Bexell (Sweden) T Sjoo	19	21	13

==== Section 3 ====
First round
(Poland) W Trecki (Poland) M Kulska	21	21
(Turkey) F M Yilmaz (Turkey) E S Basakin	19	13

Second round
3	(Denmark) S Gronbjerg (Denmark) A Magelund	21	21
(Hungary) B Papai (Hungary) R Madarasz	14	11
(England) W Jones (England) A Chaudhari	21	21
(Estonia) A Ajupov (Estonia) R Uprus	11	11
13	(France) F Delrue (France) J Moinard	21	21
(Croatia) J Meglic (Croatia) I Misir	12	10
(Portugal) K Selvarajah (Portugal) M Afonso	13	18
(Poland) W Trecki (Poland) M Kulska	21	21

Third round
3	(Denmark) S Gronbjerg (Denmark) A Magelund	11	12
(England) W Jones (England) A Chaudhari	21	21
13	(France) F Delrue (France) J Moinard	21	21
(Poland) W Trecki (Poland) M Kulska	15	13

Fourth round
(England) W Jones (England) A Chaudhari	10	16
13	(France) F Delrue (France) J Moinard	21	21

==== Section 4 ====
First round
(Romania) M Craciun (Romania) L Milu	9	13
(Scotland) A Pringle (Scotland) R Andrew	21	21
(Switzerland) M Q Pham (Switzerland) M Schnider	21	19	21
(Lithuania) J Petkus (Lithuania) G Mockute	14	21	8

Second round
5	(England) E Van Leeuwen (England) S Kelly	21	21
(Latvia) R V Blaubergs (Latvia) U Berga	10	5
(Austria) N Rudolf (Austria) S Au Yeong	19	19
(Scotland) A Pringle (Scotland) R Andrew	21	21
14	(Russia) E Kholkin (Russia) A Pustinskaia	21	21
(Poland) B Galazka (Poland) D Kwasnik	11	19
(Republic of Ireland) B O'Mahony (Republic of Ireland) O Flynn	14	10
(Switzerland) M Q Pham (Switzerland) M Schnider	21	21

Third round
5	(England) E Van Leeuwen (England) S Kelly	19	21	22
(Scotland) A Pringle (Scotland) R Andrew	21	16	20
14	(Russia) E Kholkin (Russia) A Pustinskaia	21	21
(Switzerland) M Q Pham (Switzerland) M Schnider	19	19

Fourth round
5	(England) E Van Leeuwen (England) S Kelly	21	23
14	(Russia) E Kholkin (Russia) A Pustinskaia	8	21

=== Bottom half ===
==== Section 5 ====
First round
(Sweden) J Hansson (Sweden) M Norrman	21	21
(Latvia) A D Bedritis (Latvia) L Lencevica	10	14
(Denmark) R Espersen (Denmark) F Ravn	21	21
(Cyprus) C Hadjigeorgiou (Cyprus) E Kattirtzi	4	8

Second round
(Sweden) J Hansson (Sweden) M Norrman	14	21	19
(Netherlands) W van der Aar (Netherlands) A Tirtosentono	21	18	21
(Iceland) E Hognason (Iceland) U H Orvar	10	7
15	(Romania) D Popescu (Romania) L Lungu	21	21
(Denmark) R Espersen (Denmark) F Ravn	21	21
(Hungary) M Balint (Hungary) F D Kiss	12	6
(Scotland) J Apiliga (Scotland) S Sidebottom	13	9
6	(Russia) G Karpov (Russia) A Kurdyukova	21	21

Third round
(Netherlands) W van der Aar (Netherlands) A Tirtosentono	21	21
15	(Romania) D Popescu (Romania) L Lungu	13	5
(Denmark) R Espersen (Denmark) F Ravn	15	21	22
6	(Russia) G Karpov (Russia) A Kurdyukova	21	16	24

Fourth round
(Netherlands) W van der Aar (Netherlands) A Tirtosentono	23	20	24
6	(Russia) G Karpov (Russia) A Kurdyukova	21	22	22

==== Section 6 ====
First round
(Israel) R Mogilner (Israel) S Rotshtein	11	17
(Switzerland) N Mueller (Switzerland) I Dickhaeuser	21	21

Second round
(Switzerland) N Mueller (Switzerland) I Dickhaeuser	17	21	18
(France) M Briot (France) S Bauer	21	18	21
(Lithuania) L Borusas (Lithuania) S Golubickaite	7	8
10	(France) W Villeger (France) A Desmons	21	21
(Croatia) L Ban (Croatia) I Sadaic	10	19
(Poland) L Cimosz (Poland) K Szubert	21	21
(Republic of Ireland) A McAllister (Republic of Ireland) R Woods	13	21	21
4	(Netherlands) G Duijs (Netherlands) M Linders	21	19	18

Third round
(France) M Briot (France) S Bauer	21	22
10	(France) W Villeger (France) A Desmons	17	20
(Poland) L Cimosz (Poland) K Szubert	22	21
(Republic of Ireland) A McAllister (Republic of Ireland) R Woods	20	16

Fourth round
(France) M Briot (France) S Bauer	21	21
(Poland) L Cimosz (Poland) K Szubert	16	17

==== Section 7 ====
First round
(Turkey) S B Basakin (Turkey) B Ercetin	21	21
(Moldova) P Cunev (Moldova) A Cernetchi	8	10
(Spain) A Leal (Spain) L Solis	21	21
(Finland) V Lindahl (Finland) I Suutarinen	14	13

Second round
(Turkey) S B Basakin (Turkey) B Ercetin	23	21
(Austria) K Meusburger (Austria) S Herbst	21	18
(Norway) J Osthassel (Norway) E Waland	21	14	15
16	(Ukraine) D Bosniuk (Ukraine) V Masaylo	11	21	21
(Spain) A Leal (Spain) L Solis	13	21	17
(Slovakia) A Antoska (Slovakia) A Remenova	21	18	21
(Portugal) T Coelho (Portugal) I Pardilho	6	7
7	(Germany) L Resch (Germany) E Moszczynski	21	21

Third round
(Turkey) S B Basakin (Turkey) B Ercetin	21	21
16	(Ukraine) D Bosniuk (Ukraine) V Masaylo	14	8
(Slovakia) A Antoska (Slovakia) A Remenova	21	15
7	(Germany) L Resch (Germany) E Moszczynski	23	21

Fourth round
(Turkey) S B Basakin (Turkey) B Ercetin	21	12	5
7	(Germany) L Resch (Germany) E Moszczynski	18	21	21

==== Section 8 ====
First round
(Belarus) I Larushin (Belarus) U Zakharava	21	12	22
(Czech Republic) V Kulisek (Czech Republic) V Sonnkova	17	21	20

Second round
(Belarus) I Larushin (Belarus) U Zakharava	21	21
(Belgium) H Houthoofd (Belgium) K Boonen	12	15
(Estonia) A Raudsepp (Estonia) V Korobova	10	16
11	(England) R Easton (England) H Warner	21	21
(Italy) M Massetti (Italy) J Mair	21	21	21
(Slovenia) D Lonzaric (Slovenia) M Vracar	23	15	12
(Czech Republic) V Palan (Czech Republic) T Kobylakova	17	20
2	(Bulgaria) I Stoynov (Bulgaria) H Popovska	21	22

Third round
(Belarus) I Larushin (Belarus) U Zakharava	11	13
11	(England) R Easton (England) H Warner	21	21
(Italy) M Massetti (Italy) J Mair	14	5
2	(Bulgaria) I Stoynov (Bulgaria) H Popovska	21	21

Fourth round
11	(England) R Easton (England) H Warner	21	21
2	(Bulgaria) I Stoynov (Bulgaria) H Popovska	10	14
