= 2020 European Women's Team Badminton Championships squads =

This article lists the latest women's squads lists for badminton's 2020 European Men's and Women's Team Badminton Championships. Ranking stated are based on world ranking date for 21 January 2020 as per tournament's prospectus.

== Group 1 ==
Group 1 consists of Denmark, Estonia, Ireland, and Netherlands.

=== Denmark ===
Name	DoB/Age	WS Rank	WD Rank
Mia Blichfeldt	19 August 1997 (aged 22)	13	-
Line Kjærsfeldt	20 April 1994 (aged 25)	29	-
Line Christophersen	14 January 2000 (aged 20)	55	-
Maiken Fruergaard	11 May 1995 (aged 24)	-	20
Sara Thygesen	20 January 1991 (aged 29)	-	20
Alexandra Bøje	6 December 1999 (aged 20)	-	38
Mette Poulsen	14 June 1993 (aged 26)	-	38
Amalie Magelund	13 May 2000 (aged 19)	-	49
Freja Ravn	17 February 2000 (aged 19)	-	49
Julie Dawall Jakobsen	25 March 1998 (aged 21)	49	1033

=== Estonia ===
Name	DoB/Age	WS Rank	WD Rank
Kristin Kuuba	15 February 1997 (aged 22)	62	-
Getter Saar	6 June 1992 (aged 27)	179	-
Kati-Kreet Marran	13 July 1998 (aged 21)	318	64
Helis Pajuste	28 July 1997 (aged 22)	292	638
Catlyn Kruus	9 July 2003 (aged 16)	750	866
Ramona Üprus	24 September 2003 (aged 16)	1234	866
Hannaliina Piho	5 March 1999 (aged 20)	-	-

=== Ireland ===
Name	DoB/Age	WS Rank	WD Rank
Sophia Noble	10 October 2004 (aged 15)	588	-
Chloe Magee	29 October 1987 (aged 32)	-	1005
Rachael Darragh	24 September 1997 (aged 22)	195	299
Kate Frost	9 November 1998 (aged 21)	269	196
Moya Ryan	25 March 1998 (aged 21)	436	196
Sara Boyle	31 August 1997 (aged 22)	282	299
Orla Flynn	15 March 2002 (aged 17)	916	638
Rachael Woods	16 February 2001 (aged 18)	1093	638
Rebecca Woods	16 February 2001 (aged 18)	916	638
Pamela Pontanosa	10 November 2001 (aged 18)	-	-
Aisling Ryan	24 April 1992 (aged 27)	-	-
Alexandra Troy	7 March 2002 (aged 17)	-	-

=== Netherlands ===
Name	DoB/Age	WS Rank	WD Rank
Soraya de Visch Eijbergen	6 January 1993 (aged 27)	75	-
Jaymie Laurens	22 August 2003 (aged 16)	1202	-
Selena Piek	30 September 1991 (aged 28)	-	24
Cheryl Seinen	14 June 1993 (aged 26)	-	24
Debora Jille	11 September 1999 (aged 20)	-	104
Alyssa Tirtosentono	29 May 2000 (aged 19)	-	104
Imke van der Aar	16 February 1998 (aged 21)	-	455
Gayle Mahulette	17 April 1993 (aged 26)	118	1033
Meike Versteeg	2 July 2001 (aged 18)	549	955
Nadia Choukri	21 April 2003 (aged 16)	1046	866

== Group 2 ==
Group 2 consists of Russia, Belgium, Iceland, and Lithuania.

=== Russia ===
Name	DoB/Age	WS Rank	WD Rank
Evgeniya Kosetskaya	16 November 1994 (aged 25)	26	-
Mariia Golubeva	26 May 2004 (aged 15)	902	-
Ekaterina Bolotova	12 December 1992 (aged 27)	-	27
Alina Davletova	18 July 1998 (aged 21)	-	27
Anastasiia Akchurina	14 June 1992 (aged 27)	-	44
Olga Morozova	10 March 1995 (aged 24)	-	44
Nina Vislova	4 October 1986 (aged 33)	-	142
Natalia Perminova	14 November 1991 (aged 28)	63	569
Viktoriia Kozyreva	28 September 2001 (aged 18)	227	97
Anastasiia Semenova	12 March 1999 (aged 20)	174	569

=== Belgium ===
Name	DoB/Age	WS Rank	WD Rank
Lianne Tan	20 November 1990 (aged 29)	44	-
Clara Lassaux	4 October 2001 (aged 18)	295	-
Kirstin Boonen	15 May 2001 (aged 18)	960	-
Lise Jaques	10 September 1998 (aged 21)	-	145
Flore Vandenhoucke	15 March 1995 (aged 24)	-	145
Joke de Langhe	18 July 2000 (aged 19)	-	-
Siebelijn de Sutter	8 April 2003 (aged 16)	-	-
Lien Lammertyn	21 November 2003 (aged 16)	-	-

=== Iceland ===
Name	DoB/Age	WS Rank	WD Rank
Erla Björg Hafsteinsdóttir	8 December 1978 (aged 41)	-	827
Sigríður Árnadóttir	30 May 1996 (aged 23)	688	517
Arna Karen Jóhannsdóttir	12 May 1997 (aged 22)	1155	517
Sólrún Anna Ingvarsdóttir	11 December 1999 (aged 20)	905	629

=== Lithuania ===
Name	DoB/Age	WS Rank	WD Rank
Rebeka Alekseviciute	19 August 1996 (aged 23)	1239	-
Vytaute Fomkinaite	10 December 1997 (aged 22)	232	144
Gerda Voitechovskaja	15 May 1991 (aged 28)	348	144
Samanta Golubickaite	14 December 2002 (aged 17)	1239	955
Gabija Mockute	2 November 2002 (aged 17)	-	-

== Group 3 ==
Group 3 consists of France, Belarus, England, and Israel.

=== France ===
Name	DoB/Age	WS Rank	WD Rank
Qi Xuefei	28 February 1992 (aged 27)	41	-
Marie Batomene	10 March 1995 (aged 24)	92	-
Yaëlle Hoyaux	1 February 1998 (aged 22)	138	-
Léonice Huet	21 May 2000 (aged 19)	141	-
Anne Tran	27 April 1996 (aged 23)	-	28
Delphine Delrue	6 November 1998 (aged 21)	-	32
Léa Palermo	7 July 1993 (aged 26)	-	32
Vimala Hériau	10 February 1999 (aged 21)	-	68
Margot Lambert	15 March 1999 (aged 20)	-	68
Sharone Bauer	12 April 2000 (aged 19)	-	112
Juliette Moinard	25 June 2001 (aged 18)	-	112
Ophelia Casier	16 December 1999 (aged 20)	-	-

=== Belarus ===
Name	DoB/Age	WS Rank	WD Rank
Anastasiya Cherniavskaya	29 May 1992 (aged 27)	238	164
Alesia Zaitsava	14 August 1985 (aged 34)	275	164
Julia Bitsoukova	19 September 1999 (aged 20)	404	178
Maryana Viarbitskaya	18 September 1998 (aged 21)	373	178

=== England ===
Name	DoB/Age	WS Rank	WD Rank
Lauren Smith	26 September 1991 (aged 28)	-	23
Jenny Moore	31 August 1995 (aged 24)	-	60
Victoria Williams	15 May 1995 (aged 24)	-	60
Lizzie Tolman	12 June 1999 (aged 20)	-	124
Chloe Birch	16 September 1995 (aged 24)	66	23
Abigail Holden	29 August 1999 (aged 20)	176	124
Freya Redfearn	12 November 2000 (aged 19)	262	247
Pamela Reyes	18 April 2002 (aged 17)	329	638
Grace King	21 June 2000 (aged 19)	916	638

=== Israel ===
Name	DoB/Age	WS Rank	WD Rank
Ksenia Polikarpova	11 March 1990 (aged 29)	61	-
Dana Danilenko	19 July 2001 (aged 18)	312	-
Anastasia Bantish	1 January 2002 (aged 18)	722	-
Heli Neiman	15 November 2003 (aged 16)	722	-
Yuval Pugach	15 November 2001 (aged 18)	722	-
Shery Rotshtein	3 November 2000 (aged 19)	722	-
Margeret Lurie	22 April 1999 (aged 20)	-	-

== Group 4 ==
Group 4 consists of Germany, Latvia, Portugal, and Slovakia.

=== Germany ===
Name	DoB/Age	WS Rank	WD Rank
Yvonne Li	30 May 1998 (aged 21)	42	-
Fabienne Deprez	8 February 1992 (aged 28)	64	-
Miranda Wilson	16 December 1999 (aged 20)	173	-
Linda Efler	23 January 1995 (aged 25)	-	33
Isabel Herttrich	17 March 1992 (aged 27)	-	33
Lara Käpplein	25 May 1995 (aged 24)	-	66
Kilasu Ostermeyer	5 March 1997 (aged 22)	-	79
Annabella Jäger	16 July 1998 (aged 21)	-	83
Stine Küspert	24 July 1999 (aged 20)	-	83
Franziska Volkmann	4 April 1994 (aged 25)	-	119
Emma Moszczynski	7 June 2001 (aged 18)	-	303
Ann-Kathrin Spöri	23 April 2001 (aged 18)	371	955

=== Latvia ===
Name	DoB/Age	WS Rank	WD Rank
Kristīne Šefere	4 December 1981 (aged 38)	-	955
Liāna Lencēviča	15 January 2001 (aged 19)	522	204
Jekaterina Romanova	12 November 1997 (aged 22)	387	204
Monika Radovska	12 June 1992 (aged 27)	306	518
Ieva Pope	8 January 1994 (aged 26)	405	569
Anna Kupča	19 October 2005 (aged 14)	1152	603
Annija Rulle-Titava	27 April 2004 (aged 15)	1198	603
Una Berga	16 November 2001 (aged 18)	707	866
Diāna Stognija	11 March 2001 (aged 18)	720	866

=== Portugal ===
Name	DoB/Age	WS Rank	WD Rank
Luisa Faria	22 November 1995 (aged 24)	1234	-
Ana Reis		-	1018
Adriana F. Goncalves	24 April 1999 (aged 20)	413	120
Sonia Goncalves	24 September 1994 (aged 25)	146	120
Ana Fernandes	5 September 2002 (aged 17)	1234	866
Catarina M. Martins	5 July 1999 (aged 20)	1050	866
Ines Pardilho	9 October 2000 (aged 19)	1234	866
Mariana Afonso	18 January 2002 (aged 18)	-	-
Claudia Lourenço	5 September 2002 (aged 17)	-	-
Mariana Neves	19 March 2002 (aged 17)	-	-

=== Slovakia ===
Name	DoB/Age	WS Rank	WD Rank
Mia Tarcalová	26 September 2001 (aged 18)	-	816
Lucia Vojteková	15 July 2001 (aged 18)	-	955
Martina Repiská	21 October 1995 (aged 24)	90	816
Katarína Vargová	13 April 1999 (aged 20)	412	329
Júlia Chmurovičová	26 January 2003 (aged 17)	-	-
Alžbeta Peruňská	5 November 2000 (aged 19)	-	-
Natália Tomčová	27 May 2003 (aged 16)	-	-

== Group 5 ==
Group 5 consists of Bulgaria, Hungary, Ukraine, and Wales.

=== Bulgaria ===
Name	DoB/Age	WS Rank	WD Rank
Mariya Mitsova	21 November 1996 (aged 23)	79	-
Linda Zetchiri	27 July 1987 (aged 32)	82	-
Tanya Ivanova	22 May 2003 (aged 16)	588	-
Gergana Pavlova	27 July 2003 (aged 16)	722	-
Mihaela Zlatanova	25 January 2003 (aged 17)	960	-
Maria Delcheva	19 July 2000 (aged 19)	192	866
Hristomira Popovska	5 September 2000 (aged 19)	274	325
Kaloyana Nalbantova	6 March 2006 (aged 13)	-	-
Dimitria Popstoikova	1 June 1982 (aged 37)	-	-

=== Hungary ===
Name	DoB/Age	WS Rank	WD Rank
Laura Sárosi	11 November 1992 (aged 27)	89	-
Réka Madarász	2 July 2000 (aged 19)	169	-
Mónika Szőke	4 September 1991 (aged 28)	189	-
Daniella Gonda	1 January 1994 (aged 26)	148	88
Ágnes Kőrösi	22 September 1995 (aged 24)	135	88
Vivien Sándorházi	3 January 2001 (aged 19)	246	479
Fanni Dóra Kiss	15 August 2001 (aged 18)	-	-

=== Ukraine ===
Name	DoB/Age	WS Rank	WD Rank
Marija Ulitina	5 November 1991 (aged 28)	103	-
Natalya Voytsekh	21 June 1992 (aged 27)	123	-
Yelyzaveta Zharka	14 June 1992 (aged 27)	-	82
Yevgeniya Paksyutova	19 April 1999 (aged 20)	-	258
Maryna Ilyinskaya	13 March 1999 (aged 20)	185	82
Anastasiya Prozorova	27 August 2001 (aged 18)	283	121
Valeriya Rudakova	1 February 2001 (aged 19)	337	121
Anna Mikhalkova	15 March 1997 (aged 22)	343	258
Arina Marushchak	3 December 2002 (aged 17)	1093	638

=== Wales ===
Name	DoB/Age	WS Rank	WD Rank
Jordan Hart	26 January 1995 (aged 25)	76	-
Jessica Ding	27 November 2003 (aged 16)	1156	-
Learna Herkes	13 October 2003 (aged 16)	1156	-
Jasmine Owen	4 March 2004 (aged 15)	1156	-
Aimie Whiteman	23 May 2003 (aged 16)	1156	638
Saffron Morris	3 July 2007 (aged 12)	-	-
Alice Palmer	26 February 1992 (aged 27)	-	-
Katie Whiteman	13 October 2000 (aged 19)	-	-

== Group 6 ==
Group 6 consists of Turkey, Czech Republic, Finland, and Slovenia.

=== Turkey ===
Name	DoB/Age	WS Rank	WD Rank
Neslihan Yiğit	26 February 1994 (aged 25)	38	-
Aliye Demirbağ	19 February 1998 (aged 21)	69	-
Özge Bayrak	14 February 1992 (aged 27)	74	-
Büşra Ünlü	30 January 1999 (aged 21)	349	-
Bengisu Erçetin	1 January 2001 (aged 19)	-	42
Nazlıcan İnci	6 March 2000 (aged 19)	-	42
Zehra Erdem	23 June 2001 (aged 18)	-	234
İlayda Nur Özelgül	19 September 1999 (aged 20)	-	234

=== Czech Republic ===
Name	DoB/Age	WS Rank	WD Rank
Sabina Milová	17 January 1997 (aged 23)	199	-
Kateřina Mikelová	7 July 2002 (aged 17)	722	-
Tallulah Sharleen van Coppenolle	13 September 2003 (aged 16)	960	-
Alžběta Bášová	22 October 1993 (aged 26)	-	100
Michaela Fuchsová	27 October 1999 (aged 20)	-	100
Lucie Krpatová	30 May 2002 (aged 17)	-	605
Kateřina Tomalová	10 April 1992 (aged 27)	126	247
Tereza Švábíková	14 May 2000 (aged 19)	133	247
Tereza Kobyláková	19 November 2001 (aged 18)	577	819
Kateřina Zuzáková	14 February 2002 (aged 17)	1202	605

=== Finland ===
Name	DoB/Age	WS Rank	WD Rank
Airi Mikkelä	5 April 1993 (aged 26)	91	-
Nella Nyqvist	20 March 2006 (aged 13)	1050	-
Inalotta Suutarinen	1 April 2000 (aged 19)	-	240
Jenny Nyström	2 February 1994 (aged 26)	-	608
Nella Siilasmaa	19 December 1997 (aged 22)	326	399
Hanna Karkaus	16 September 1997 (aged 22)	466	399
Julia Salonen	22 March 2002 (aged 17)	1046	408
Jessica Jäntti	17 September 1998 (aged 21)	1046	638
Maija Krzywacki	1 July 2000 (aged 19)	1201	955

=== Slovenia ===
Name	DoB/Age	WS Rank	WD Rank
Iza Šalehar	24 December 1997 (aged 22)	-	127
Nika Arih	19 October 1998 (aged 21)	-	941
Lia Šalehar	26 March 1999 (aged 20)	284	127
Petra Polanc	17 August 2000 (aged 19)	205	638
Kaja Stanković	20 June 1994 (aged 25)	687	638
Nina Kotar	27 April 1985 (aged 34)	1137	1016

== Group 7 ==
Group 7 consists of Spain, Norway, Poland, Scotland, and Sweden.

=== Spain ===
Name	DoB/Age	WS Rank	WD Rank
Carolina Marín	15 June 1993 (aged 26)	10	-
Clara Azurmendi	4 May 1998 (aged 21)	72	-
Beatriz Corrales	3 December 1992 (aged 27)	153	-
Paula López	7 October 1999 (aged 20)	-	293
Lorena Uslé	16 February 1994 (aged 25)	-	301
Claudia Leal	21 January 2000 (aged 20)	685	301
Manuela Díaz	26 March 1989 (aged 30)	456	619
Laura Solís	25 June 2001 (aged 18)	702	609
Nerea Ivorra	8 November 1997 (aged 22)	1156	866
Lucía Rodríguez	8 March 2004 (aged 15)	-	-
Ania Setién	6 March 2003 (aged 16)	-	-

=== Norway ===
Name	DoB/Age	WS Rank	WD Rank
Vera Ellingsen	5 July 2000 (aged 19)	1032	-
Solvår Flåten Jørgensen	13 November 1997 (aged 22)	-	160
Natalie Syvertsen	24 November 1995 (aged 24)	-	160
Marie Christensen	20 January 2000 (aged 20)	-	372
Aimee Hong	30 September 2002 (aged 17)	-	372
Emilie Hamang	4 February 1998 (aged 22)	259	624
Sofia Macsali	20 August 2001 (aged 18)	560	311
Emilia Petersen Norberg	25 June 2002 (aged 17)	558	311
Vilde Espeseth	27 October 1997 (aged 22)	-	-

=== Poland ===
Name	DoB/Age	WS Rank	WD Rank
Magdalena Świerczyńska	4 April 1998 (aged 21)	-	177
Aleksandra Goszczyńska	16 February 1999 (aged 20)	-	180
Karolina Szubert	3 August 2001 (aged 18)	-	191
Wiktoria Dąbczyńska	4 May 1999 (aged 20)	127	180
Joanna Podedworny	19 February 2005 (aged 14)	510	1005
Zuzanna Jankowska	18 August 2002 (aged 17)	1233	1005

=== Scotland ===
Name	DoB/Age	WS Rank	WD Rank
Kirsty Gilmour	21 September 1993 (aged 26)	30	-
Julie MacPherson	17 November 1997 (aged 22)	-	142
Ciara Torrance	1 September 1999 (aged 20)	-	142
Eleanor O'Donnell	1 September 1998 (aged 21)	-	161
Rachel Andrew	19 January 2001 (aged 19)	-	638
Holly Newall	24 July 1998 (aged 21)	212	313
Lauren Middleton	23 July 2000 (aged 19)	554	325
Rachel Sugden	13 November 2001 (aged 18)	695	325

=== Sweden ===
Name	DoB/Age	WS Rank	WD Rank
Ashwathi Pillai	14 July 2000 (aged 19)	145	-
Rebecca Kuhl	25 July 1995 (aged 24)	147	-
Emma Karlsson	16 May 1998 (aged 21)	-	39
Johanna Magnusson	15 November 1998 (aged 21)	-	39
Clara Nistad	8 February 1996 (aged 24)	-	61
Moa Sjöö	30 May 1997 (aged 22)	-	61
Tilda Sjöö	10 July 2000 (aged 19)	-	132
Edith Urell	4 August 2003 (aged 16)	367	523
Cecilia Wang	3 August 2002 (aged 17)	1137	523
