= 2021 Spain Masters =

Badminton tournament in Huelva

Tournament details
- Dates: 18–23 May
- Edition: 4th
- Level: Super 300
- Total prize money: US$140,000
- Venue: Palacio de los Deportes Carolina Marín
- Location: Huelva, Spain

Champions
- Men's singles: (France) Toma Junior Popov
- Women's singles: (Indonesia) Putri Kusuma Wardani
- Men's doubles: (Indonesia) Pramudya Kusumawardana (Indonesia) Yeremia Rambitan
- Women's doubles: (Indonesia) Yulfira Barkah (Indonesia) Febby Valencia Dwijayanti Gani
- Mixed doubles: (Indonesia) Rinov Rivaldy (Indonesia) Pitha Haningtyas Mentari

The 2021 Spain Masters was a badminton tournament which was held at the Palacio de los Deportes Carolina Marín in Huelva, Spain, from 18 to 23 May 2021 with a total prize purse of $140,000.

== Tournament ==
The 2021 Spain Masters was the fourth tournament of the 2021 BWF World Tour and also part of the Spain Masters championships, which had been held since 2018. This tournament was organized by the Spanish Badminton Federation and sanctioned by the BWF.

=== Venue ===
This international tournament was held at the Palacio de los Deportes Carolina Marín in Huelva, Spain.

=== Point distribution ===
Below is the point distribution table for each phase of the tournament based on the BWF points system for the BWF World Tour Super 300 event.

Winner	Runner-up	3/4	5/8	9/16	17/32
7,000	5,950	4,900	3,850	2,750	1,670

=== Prize money ===
The total prize money for this tournament was US$140,000. Distribution of prize money was in accordance with BWF regulations.

Event	Winner	Finals	Semi-finals	Quarter-finals	Last 16
Singles	$10,500	$5,320	$2,030	$840	$490
Doubles	$11,060	$5,320	$1,960	$1,015	$525

== Men's singles ==
=== Seeds ===
1. (Indonesia) Shesar Hiren Rhustavito (semi-finals)
2. (France) Toma Junior Popov (champion)
3. (Israel) Misha Zilberman (quarter-finals)
4. (India) Subhankar Dey (withdrew)
5. (Spain) Pablo Abián (second round)
6. (Brazil) Ygor Coelho de Oliveira (quarter-finals)
7. (India) Ajay Jayaram (withdrew)
8. (Sweden) Felix Burestedt (second round)

=== Finals ===
Semi-finals
1	(Indonesia) Shesar Hiren Rhustavito	16	19
(Indonesia) Chico Aura Dwi Wardoyo	21	21
(South Korea) Lee Dong-keun	7	10
2	(France) Toma Junior Popov	21	21

Final
(Indonesia) Chico Aura Dwi Wardoyo	15	17
2	(France) Toma Junior Popov	21	21

=== Top half ===
==== Section 1 ====
First Round
1	(Indonesia) S H Rhustavito	21	22
(Indonesia) I M Mustofa	18	20
PFR	(Malaysia) Leong J H	21	16	21
(Germany) M Weißkirchen	16	21	23
8	(Sweden) F Burestedt	21	21
PFR	(Spain) C Piris	11	11
PFR	(Denmark) J Bruun	9	11
(Malaysia) Cheam J W	21	21

Second Round
1	(Indonesia) S H Rhustavito	21	21
(Germany) M Weißkirchen	15	17
8	(Sweden) F Burestedt	21	15	16
(Malaysia) Cheam J W	14	21	21

Quarter-finals
1	(Indonesia) S H Rhustavito	21	21
(Malaysia) Cheam J W	9	10

==== Section 2 ====
First Round
PFR	(Spain) Á Vázquez	11	15
(Netherlands) J Kweekel	21	21
(Canada) B. R. Sankeerth	15	11
(Indonesia) C A Dwi Wardoyo	21	21
6	(Brazil) Y Coelho	21	21
(Mauritius) G Paul	10	14
(Denmark) V Svendsen	21	21
(France) C Popov	19	18

Second Round
(Netherlands) J Kweekel	22	11	13
(Indonesia) C A Dwi Wardoyo	20	21	21
6	(Brazil) Y Coelho	25	21
(Denmark) V Svendsen	23	14

Quarter-finals
(Indonesia) C A Dwi Wardoyo	21	21
6	(Brazil) Y Coelho	17	7

=== Bottom half ===
==== Section 3 ====
First Round
(South Korea) Lee D-k	22	21
(Denmark) D J Holm	20	11
(Belgium) M Moreels	18	16
5	(Spain) P Abián	21	21
(Germany) K Schäfer	22	16	13
(France) L Claerbout	20	21	21
PFR	(England) A Lane	19	23	17
3	(Israel) M Zilberman	21	21	21

Second Round
(South Korea) Lee D-k	21	21
5	(Spain) P Abián	6	19
(France) L Claerbout	21	13	18
3	(Israel) M Zilberman	16	21	21

Quarter-finals
(South Korea) Lee D-k	21	21
3	(Israel) M Zilberman	11	12

==== Section 4 ====
First Round
PFR	(Spain) A Alcalá	17	18
(Denmark) M Christophersen	21	21
PFR	(Denmark) M Johannesen	21	21
PFR	(England) J Torjussen	17	18
(Estonia) R Must	14	12
(Malaysia) Ng T Y	21	21
(Spain) L E Peñalver	21	15	11
2	(France) T J Popov	18	21	21

Second Round
(Denmark) M Christophersen	21	21
PFR	(Denmark) M Johannesen	11	16
(Malaysia) Ng T Y	10	12
2	(France) T J Popov	21	21

Quarter-finals
(Denmark) M Christophersen	10	21	19
2	(France) T J Popov	21	16	21

== Women's singles ==
=== Seeds ===
1. (Spain) Carolina Marín (withdrew)
2. (Denmark) Line Kjærsfeldt (withdrew)
3. (Denmark) Line Christophersen (final)
4. (Belgium) Lianne Tan (quarter-finals)
5. (Indonesia) Ruselli Hartawan (second round)
6. (Denmark) Julie Dawall Jakobsen (second round)
7. (Switzerland) Sabrina Jaquet (withdrew)
8. (Estonia) Kristin Kuuba (second round)

=== Finals ===
Semi-finals
(France) Léonice Huet	8	14
(Indonesia) Putri Kusuma Wardani	21	21
3	(Denmark) Line Christophersen	21	21
(Switzerland) Jenjira Stadelmann	9	19

Final
(Indonesia) Putri Kusuma Wardani	21	21
3	(Denmark) Line Christophersen	15	10

=== Top half ===
==== Section 1 ====
First Round
PFR	(Spain) N Ivorra	w	/	o
(India) T Lad
PFR	(Spain) C Teruel	w	/	o
(Malaysia) Kisona S
8	(Estonia) K Kuuba	21	16
(Netherlands) S de Visch Eijbergen	15	6^{r}
(France) L Huet	w	/	o
(United States) I Zhong

Second Round
PFR	(Spain) N Ivorra	21	21
PFR	(Spain) C Teruel	12	13
8	(Estonia) K Kuuba	19	21	18
(France) L Huet	21	9	21

Quarter-finals
PFR	(Spain) N Ivorra	4	13
(France) L Huet	21	21

==== Section 2 ====
First Round
4	(Belgium) L Tan	21	21
PFR	(Spain) L Álvarez	7	11
(Slovakia) M Repiská	21	15	14
(France) Y Hoyaux	12	21	21
5	(Indonesia) R Hartawan	w	/	o
(India) S I Farooqui
PFR	(Republic of Ireland) S Boyle	6	11
(Indonesia) P K Wardani	21	21

Second Round
4	(Belgium) L Tan	21	23	21
(France) Y Hoyaux	7	25	13
5	(Indonesia) R Hartawan	14	21	15
(Indonesia) P K Wardani	21	16	21

Quarter-finals
4	(Belgium) L Tan	21	19	13
(Indonesia) P K Wardani	18	21	21

=== Bottom half ===
==== Section 3 ====
First Round
(Czech Republic) T Švábíková	9	19
(Spain) B Corrales	21	21
(Poland) J Hart	17	21	13
6	(Denmark) J D Jakobsen	21	14	21
(Czech Republic) K Tomalová	9	10
(Spain) C Azurmendi	21	21
(Republic of Ireland) R Darragh	12	13
3	(Denmark) L Christophersen	21	21

Second Round
(Spain) B Corrales	18	21	21
6	(Denmark) J D Jakobsen	21	19	13
(Spain) C Azurmendi	17	10
3	(Denmark) L Christophersen	21	21

Quarter-finals
(Spain) B Corrales
3	(Denmark) L Christophersen	w	/	o

==== Section 4 ====
First Round
(France) M Batomene	21	22	14
(Denmark) I A Andersen	14	24	21
(Republic of Ireland) K Frost	w	/	o
7	(Switzerland) S Jaquet
(Switzerland) J Stadelmann	w	/	o
(Malaysia) Goh J W
(England) F Redfearn	w	/	o
2	(Denmark) L Kjærsfeldt

Second Round
(Denmark) I A Andersen	21	21
(Republic of Ireland) K Frost	13	6
(Switzerland) J Stadelmann	21	21
(England) F Redfearn	8	19

Quarter-finals
(Denmark) I A Andersen	21	19	19
(Switzerland) J Stadelmann	15	21	21

== Men's doubles ==
=== Seeds ===
1. (Denmark) Kim Astrup / Anders Skaarup Rasmussen (quarter-finals)
2. (Indonesia) Leo Rolly Carnando / Daniel Marthin (quarter-finals)
3. (Indonesia) Muhammad Shohibul Fikri / Bagas Maulana (quarter-finals)
4. (France) Christo Popov / Toma Junior Popov (semi-finals)
5. (Indonesia) Pramudya Kusumawardana / Yeremia Rambitan (champions)
6. (Denmark) Daniel Lundgaard / Mathias Thyrri (withdrew)
7. (Denmark) Joel Eipe / Rasmus Kjær (withdrew)
8. (Netherlands) Ruben Jille / Ties van der Lecq (second round)

=== Finals ===
Semi-finals
5	(Indonesia) Pramudya Kusumawardana (Indonesia) Yeremia Rambitan	18	21	21
4	(France) Christo Popov (France) Toma Junior Popov	21	19	14
(Indonesia) Sabar Karyaman Gutama (Indonesia) Muhammad Reza Pahlevi Isfahani	21	13	21
(Scotland) Adam Hall (Denmark) Frederik Søgaard	19	21	14

Final
5	(Indonesia) Pramudya Kusumawardana (Indonesia) Yeremia Rambitan	21	18	21
(Indonesia) Sabar Karyaman Gutama (Indonesia) Muhammad Reza Pahlevi Isfahani	15	21	14

=== Top half ===
==== Section 1 ====
First Round
1	(Denmark) K Astrup (Denmark) A S Rasmussen	21	21
(Spain) J Molares (Spain) J Pérez	7	9
(India) K P Garaga (India) V V G Panjala
(France) S Corvée (France) K Lovang	w	/	o
5	(Indonesia) P Kusumawardana (Indonesia) Y Rambitan	19	21	21
(Denmark) E Lauritzen (Denmark) M Vestergaard	21	13	14
(France) L Corvée (France) R Labar	21	21
(Scotland) C Grimley (Scotland) M Grimley	15	18

Second Round
1	(Denmark) K Astrup (Denmark) A S Rasmussen	21	21
(France) S Corvée (France) K Lovang	10	10
5	(Indonesia) P Kusumawardana (Indonesia) Y Rambitan	21	21
(France) L Corvée (France) R Labar	15	13

Quarter-finals
1	(Denmark) K Astrup (Denmark) A S Rasmussen	17	21	11
5	(Indonesia) P Kusumawardana (Indonesia) Y Rambitan	21	15	21

==== Section 2 ====
First Round
4	(France) C Popov (France) T J Popov	22	23
(Malaysia) Yee J C (Malaysia) Chia W J	20	21
(Malaysia) Man W C (Malaysia) Tee K W	w	/	d
(Algeria) M A Belarbi (Algeria) A Hamek	w	/	d
6	(Denmark) D Lundgaard (Denmark) M Thyrri
(Spain) J Monroy (Spain) C Piris	w	/	o
(Spain) A Álvarez (Spain) P Murciano	13	19
(Spain) E Baschwitz (Spain) Á Leal	21	21

Second Round
4	(France) C Popov (France) T J Popov	w	/	o
-
(Spain) J Monroy (Spain) C Piris	20	21	21
(Spain) E Baschwitz (Spain) Á Leal	22	18	17

Quarter-finals
4	(France) C Popov (France) T J Popov	21	18	21
(Spain) J Monroy (Spain) C Piris	16	21	8

=== Bottom half ===
==== Section 3 ====
First Round
(Indonesia) S K Gutama (Indonesia) M R P Isfahani	21	21
(Germany) D Hess (Germany) J Pistorius	13	17
(Spain) A Alcalá (Spain) Á Vázquez	7	14
8	(Netherlands) R Jille (Netherlands) T van der Lecq	21	21
(England) M Clare (England) E van Leeuwen	w	/	o
(India) T Kona (India) S Sharma
(Republic of Ireland) J Magee (Republic of Ireland) P Reynolds	12	12
3	(Indonesia) M S Fikri (Indonesia) B Maulana	21	21

Second Round
(Indonesia) S K Gutama (Indonesia) M R P Isfahani	22	21
8	(Netherlands) R Jille (Netherlands) T van der Lecq	20	15
(England) M Clare (England) E Van Leeuwen	13	16
3	(Indonesia) M S Fikri (Indonesia) B Maulana	21	21

Quarter-finals
(Indonesia) S K Gutama (Indonesia) M R P Isfahani	21	21
3	(Indonesia) M S Fikri (Indonesia) B Maulana	16	19

==== Section 4 ====
First Round
(England) R Easton (England) Z Russ	19	13
(England) C Hemming (England) S Stallwood	21	21
(Scotland) A Hall (Denmark) F Søgaard	w	/	o
7	(Denmark) J Eipe (Denmark) R Kjær
(Norway) T Flåtten (Norway) V Rikheim	20	17
(France) F Delrue (France) W Villeger	22	21
(Germany) M Datko (Germany) P Scheiel	12	9
2	(Indonesia) L R Carnando (Indonesia) D Marthin	21	21

Second Round
(England) C Hemming (England) S Stallwood	5	21	20
(Scotland) A Hall (Denmark) F Søgaard	21	13	22
(France) F Delrue (France) W Villeger	18	17
2	(Indonesia) L R Carnando (Indonesia) D Marthin	21	21

Quarter-finals
(Scotland) A Hall (Denmark) F Søgaard	21	17	24
2	(Indonesia) L R Carnando (Indonesia) D Marthin	18	21	22

== Women's doubles ==
=== Seeds ===
1. (Denmark) Amalie Magelund / Freja Ravn (final)
2. (Russia) Anastasiia Akchurina / Olga Morozova (withdrew)
3. (Estonia) Kati-Kreet Marran / Helina Rüütel (second round)
4. (Denmark) Julie Finne-Ipsen / Mai Surrow (quarter-finals)
5. (Malaysia) Anna Cheong / Yap Cheng Wen (quarter-finals)
6. (Indonesia) Nita Violina Marwah / Putri Syaikah (quarter-finals)
7. (Scotland) Julie MacPherson / Ciara Torrance (semi-finals)
8. (Netherlands) Debora Jille / (France) Léa Palermo (second round)

=== Finals ===
Semi-finals
1	(Denmark) Amalie Magelund (Denmark) Freja Ravn	17	21	21
(Netherlands) Alyssa Tirtosentono (Netherlands) Imke van der Aar	21	15	14
7	(Scotland) Julie MacPherson (Scotland) Ciara Torrance	10	14
(Indonesia) Yulfira Barkah (Indonesia) Febby Valencia Dwijayanti Gani	21	21

Final
1	(Denmark) Amalie Magelund (Denmark) Freja Ravn	16	14
(Indonesia) Yulfira Barkah (Indonesia) Febby Valencia Dwijayanti Gani	21	21

=== Top half ===
==== Section 1 ====
First Round
(Spain) C Azurmendi (Spain) B Corrales	21	21
(Spain) N Ivorra (Spain) C Leal	19	9
(Germany) A Jäger (Germany) S Küspert	23	21
(Republic of Ireland) K Frost (Republic of Ireland) M Ryan	21	11

Second Round
1	(Denmark) A Magelund (Denmark) F Ravn	21	19	21
(Spain) C Azurmendi (Spain) B Corrales	13	21	14
5	(Malaysia) A Cheong (Malaysia) Yap C W	19	21	21
(Germany) A Jäger (Germany) S Küspert	21	6	17

Quarter-finals
1	(Denmark) A Magelund (Denmark) F Ravn	13	21	21
5	(Malaysia) A Cheong (Malaysia) Yap C W	21	18	17

==== Section 2 ====
First Round
(India) T Jolly (India) G G Pullela
(England) J Hopton (England) J Pugh	w	/	o
(Malaysia) Yap R C (Malaysia) Yap Y	15	21	19
(Netherlands) A Tirtosentono (Netherlands) I van der Aar	21	13	21

Second Round
3	(Estonia) K-K Marran (Estonia) H Rüütel	9	21	12
(England) J Hopton (England) J Pugh	21	12	21
8	(Netherlands) D Jille (France) L Palermo	19	21	16
(Netherlands) A Tirtosentono (Netherlands) I van der Aar	21	14	21

Quarter-finals
(England) J Hopton (England) J Pugh	15	8
(Netherlands) A Tirtosentono (Netherlands) I van der Aar	21	21

=== Bottom half ===
==== Section 3 ====
First Round
(France) L Jaffrennou (France) T Margueritte	21	21
(Spain) A Cuervas (Spain) E Lorenzo	13	15
(Sweden) M Sjöö (Sweden) T Sjöö
(England) G King (England) L Tolman	w	/	o

Second Round
(France) L Jaffrennou (France) T Margueritte	12	5
7	(Scotland) J MacPherson (Scotland) C Torrance	21	21
(England) G King (England) L Tolman	13	8
4	(Denmark) J Finne-Ipsen (Denmark) M Surrow	21	21

Quarter-finals
7	(Scotland) J MacPherson (Scotland) C Torrance	21	13	21
4	(Denmark) J Finne-Ipsen (Denmark) M Surrow	14	21	14

==== Section 4 ====
First Round
(Sweden) J Magnusson (Sweden) C Nistad	21	21
(France) F Vallet (France) E Vercelot	9	12
(Indonesia) Y Barkah (Indonesia) F V D Gani	21	21
(Indonesia) F D Kusuma (Indonesia) A C Pratiwi	13	18

Second Round
(Sweden) J Magnusson (Sweden) C Nistad	21	14
6	(Indonesia) N V Marwah (Indonesia) P Syaikah	23	21
(Indonesia) Y Barkah (Indonesia) F V D Gani	w	/	o
2	(Russia) A Akchurina (Russia) O Morozova

Quarter-finals
6	(Indonesia) N V Marwah (Indonesia) P Syaikah	21	17	12
(Indonesia) Y Barkah (Indonesia) F V D Gani	19	21	21

== Mixed doubles ==
=== Seeds ===
1. (Indonesia) Rinov Rivaldy / Pitha Haningtyas Mentari (champions)
2. (Denmark) Niclas Nøhr / Amalie Magelund (final)
3. (Russia) Evgenij Dremin / Evgenia Dimova (withdrew)
4. (Scotland) Adam Hall / Julie MacPherson (semi-finals)
5. (France) Fabien Delrue / Léa Palermo (second round)
6. (France) Eloi Adam / Margot Lambert (first round)
7. (Denmark) Mathias Thyrri / Mai Surrow (withdrew)
8. (Indonesia) Dejan Ferdinansyah / Serena Kani (quarter-finals)

=== Finals ===
Semi-finals
1	(Indonesia) Rinov Rivaldy (Indonesia) Pitha Haningtyas Mentari	21	21
4	(Scotland) Adam Hall (Scotland) Julie MacPherson	16	15
(Netherlands) Ruben Jille (Netherlands) Imke van der Aar	11	21	6
2	(Denmark) Niclas Nøhr (Denmark) Amalie Magelund	21	18	21

Final
1	(Indonesia) Rinov Rivaldy (Indonesia) Pitha Haningtyas Mentari	21	21
2	(Denmark) Niclas Nøhr (Denmark) Amalie Magelund	18	15

=== Top half ===
==== Section 1 ====
First Round
1	(Indonesia) R Rivaldy (Indonesia) P H Mentari	21	21
(Denmark) E Lauritzen (Denmark) I Bergstein	9	13
(Republic of Ireland) P Reynolds (Republic of Ireland) R Darragh	21	21
PFR	(France) S Corvee (France) E Vercelot	17	19
6	(France) E Adam (France) M Lambert	18	10
(Indonesia) Z J Sumanti (Indonesia) H Julimarbela	21	21
(France) K Lovang (France) F Vallet	9	12
(England) C Hemming (England) J Pugh	21	21

Second Round
1	(Indonesia) R Rivaldy (Indonesia) P H Mentari	21	21
(Republic of Ireland) P Reynolds (Republic of Ireland) R Darragh	8	13
(Indonesia) Z J Sumanti (Indonesia) H Julimarbela	18	21	12
(England) C Hemming (England) J Pugh	21	17	21

Quarter-finals
1	(Indonesia) R Rivaldy (Indonesia) P H Mentari	21	21
(England) C Hemming (England) J Pugh	18	17

==== Section 2 ====
First Round
4	(Scotland) A Hall (Scotland) J MacPherson	w	/	o
(United States) M Fogarty (United States) I Zhong
(Indonesia) M Y Maulana (Indonesia) A Wiratama	14	21	23
(Scotland) C Grimley (Scotland) E O'Donnell	21	13	21
PFR	(Indonesia) G M Al Ilham (Indonesia) N K M Istarani	14	21	21
(Indonesia) A B Cahyono (Indonesia) W O Kandow	21	18	11
(Spain) J Pérez (Spain) C Leal	21	18	21
(Israel) M Zilberman (Israel) S Zilberman	19	21	17

Second Round
4	(Scotland) A Hall (Scotland) J MacPherson	21	21
(Indonesia) M Y Maulana (Indonesia) A Wiratama	11	10
PFR	(Indonesia) G M Al Ilham (Indonesia) N K M Istarani	21	21
(Spain) J Pérez (Spain) C Leal	15	16

Quarter-finals
4	(Scotland) A Hall (Scotland) J MacPherson	21	21
PFR	(Indonesia) G M Al Ilham (Indonesia) N K M Istarani	15	19

=== Bottom half ===
==== Section 3 ====
First Round
(Germany) M Datko (Germany) S Küspert	13	11
(Netherlands) R Jille (Netherlands) I van der Aar	21	21
(Spain) J Molares (Spain) E Lorenzo	18	5
5	(France) F Delrue (France) L Palermo	21	21
(France) W Villeger (France) S Bauer	21	21
(Belgium) J van Nieuwkerke (Belgium) L Jaques	17	18
(Germany) P Scheiel (Germany) F Volkmann	21	18	21
PFR	(Republic of Ireland) J Magee (Republic of Ireland) S Boyle	18	21	8

Second Round
(Netherlands) R Jille (Netherlands) I van der Aar	21	14	21
5	(France) F Delrue (France) L Palermo	9	21	18
(France) W Villeger (France) S Bauer	21	14	21
(Germany) P Scheiel (Germany) F Volkmann	17	21	17

Quarter-finals
(Netherlands) R Jille (Netherlands) I van der Aar	17	21	21
(France) W Villeger (France) S Bauer	21	14	15

==== Section 4 ====
First Round
(England) G Mairs (England) J Moore
(Netherlands) T van der Lecq (Netherlands) D Jille	w	/	o
(England) S Stallwood (England) L Tolman	12	13
8	(Indonesia) D Ferdinansyah (Indonesia) S Kani	21	21
(Russia) R Kargaev (Russia) V Vorobeva	13	21	21
(Germany) J Pistorius (Germany) A Jäger	21	17	15
(Scotland) M Grimley (Scotland) C Torrance	21	15	10
2	(Denmark) N Nøhr (Denmark) A Magelund	17	21	21

Second Round
(Netherlands) T van der Lecq (Netherlands) D Jille	12	15
8	(Indonesia) D Ferdinansyah (Indonesia) S Kani	21	21
(Russia) R Kargaev (Russia) V Vorobeva	14	13
2	(Denmark) N Nøhr (Denmark) A Magelund	21	21

Quarter-finals
8	(Indonesia) D Ferdinansyah (Indonesia) S Kani	8	9
2	(Denmark) N Nøhr (Denmark) A Magelund	21	21

Preceded by 2020 Spain Masters	Spain Masters	Succeeded by 2023 Spain Masters
Preceded by 2021 Orléans Masters	BWF World Tour; 2021 BWF season	Succeeded by 2021 Denmark Open
