= Christine Busch =

Danish badminton player (born 2001)

Personal information
- Born: Christine Busch Andreasen; 15 March 2001 (age 25) Copenhagen, Denmark
- Years active: 2016–present
- Height: 1.65 m (5 ft 5 in)

Sport
- Country: Denmark
- Sport: Badminton
- Handedness: Right

Women's & mixed doubles
- Highest ranking: 38 (WD with Amalie Schulz, 18 October 2022); 18 (XD with Mads Vestergaard, 15 April 2025)
- Current ranking: 38 (XD with Mads Vestergaard, 10 November 2026)
- BWF profile
Medal record
Women's badminton
Representing Denmark
European Championships
Bronze medal – third place	2025 Horsens	Mixed doubles
European Women's Team Championships
Gold medal – first place	2024 Łódź	Women's team
European Mixed Team Championships
Gold medal – first place	2023 Aire-sur-la-Lys	Mixed team
Gold medal – first place	2025 Baku	Mixed team
European Junior Championships
Silver medal – second place	2018 Tallinn	Mixed team
Bronze medal – third place	2018 Tallinn	Mixed' doubles

Christine Busch Andreasen (born 15 March 2001) is a Danish badminton player specialized in doubles play.

== Career ==
Busch won a bronze medal in the mixed doubles and a silver medal in the women's team event at the 2018 European Junior Championships.

In 2022, Busch managed to bring home two victories in the women's doubles and mixed doubles finals at the Czech Open.

Busch and Vestergaard won their first BWF 100 championship at the 2023 Abu Dhabi Masters after defeating the Singaporean pair Jessica Tan and Terry Hee in a rubber set. Shortly after that, the four met again at the 2023 Guwahati Masters, and this time, Busch and Vestergaard had to accept defeat.

In the team event, Busch helped Denmark defend their European Mixed Team title after defeating France in the final with a score of 3–2.

In 2026, Busch and Vestergaard reached the quarter-finals in the All England Open by beating World mixed doubles number 1 Feng Yanzhe and Huang Dongping.

== Achievements ==
=== European Championships ===
Mixed doubles
Year	Venue	Partner	Opponent	Score	Result
2025	Forum; Horsens, Denmark	(Denmark) Mads Vestergaard	(France) Thom Gicquel (France) Delphine Delrue	17–21, 18–21	Bronze

=== European Junior Championships ===
Mixed doubles
Year	Venue	Partner	Opponent	Score	Result
2018	Kalev Sports Hall; Tallinn, Estonia	(Denmark) Mads Vestergaard	(France) Juliette Moinard (France) Fabien Delrue	19–21, 17–21	Bronze

=== BWF World Tour (1 titles, 2 runners-up) ===
The BWF World Tour, which was announced on 19 March 2017 and implemented in 2018, is a series of elite badminton tournaments sanctioned by the Badminton World Federation (BWF). The BWF World Tours are divided into levels of World Tour Finals, Super 1000, Super 750, Super 500, Super 300 (part of the HSBC World Tour), and the BWF Tour Super 100.

Mixed doubles
Year	Tournament	Level	Partner	Opponent	Score	Result
2023	Abu Dhabi Masters	Super 100	(Denmark) Mads Vestergaard	(Singapore) Terry Hee (Singapore) Jessica Tan	20–22, 21–17, 21–18	(gold) Winner
2023	Guwahati Masters	Super 100	(Denmark) Mads Vestergaard	(Singapore) Terry Hee (Singapore) Jessica Tan	19–21, 11–21	(silver) Runner-up
2026	German Open	Super 300	(Denmark) Mads Vestergaard	(China) Cheng Xing (China) Zhang Chi	12–21, 17–21	(silver) Runner-up

=== BWF International Challenge/Series (8 titles, 5 runners-up) ===
Women's doubles
Year	Tournament	Partner	Opponent	Score	Result
2018	Lithuanian International	(Denmark) Amalie Schulz	(Estonia) Helina Rüütel (Estonia) Kristin Kuuba	20–22, 9–21	(silver) Runner-up
2019	Lithuanian International	(Denmark) Amalie Schulz	(Netherlands) Debora Jille (Netherlands) Alyssa Tirtosentono	18–21, 10–21	(silver) Runner-up
2021	Portugal International	(Denmark) Amalie Schulz	(Estonia) Kati-Kreet Marran (Estonia) Helina Rüütel	21–16, 21–14	(gold) Winner
2022	Irish Open	(Denmark) Amalie Schulz	(Chinese Taipei) Chang Ching-hui (Chinese Taipei) Yang Ching-tun	21–19, 12–21, 19–21	(gold) Winner
2022	Czech Open	(Denmark) Amalie Schulz	(Chinese Taipei) Liu Chiao-yun (Chinese Taipei) Wang Yu-qiao	21–14, 8–21, 30–29	(gold) Winner
2023	Portugal International	(Denmark) Amalie Schulz	(Turkey) Bengisu Erçetin (Turkey) Nazlıcan İnci	9–21, 17–21	(silver) Runner-up

Mixed doubles
Year	Tournament	Partner	Opponent	Score	Result
2022	Czech Open	(Denmark) Mads Vestergaard	(Chinese Taipei) Chiu Hsiang-chieh (Chinese Taipei) Lin Xiao-min	21–12, 21–16	(gold) Winner
2023	Estonian International	(Denmark) Mads Vestergaard	(Germany) Malik Bourakkadi (Germany) Leona Michalski	21–13, 21–10	(gold) Winner
2023	Polish Open	(Denmark) Mads Vestergaard	(Denmark) Jesper Toft (Denmark) Clara Graversen	21–15, 21–13	(gold) Winner
2023	Denmark Masters	(Denmark) Mads Vestergaard	(India) N. Sikki Reddy (India) Rohan Kapoor	16–21, 17–21	(silver) Runner-up
2023	Nantes International	(Denmark) Mads Vestergaard	(India) Tanisha Crasto (India) Sai Pratheek K.	14–21, 21–14, 21–17	(gold) Winner
2023	Scottish Open	(Denmark) Mads Vestergaard	(Denmark) Jesper Toft (Denmark) Clara Graversen	21–15, 21–19	(gold) Winner
2025	Scottish Open	(Denmark) Mads Vestergaard	(Denmark) Rasmus Espersen (Denmark) Amalie Cecille Kudsk	21–23, 21–14, 14–21	(silver) Runner-up

BWF International Challenge tournament
BWF International Series tournament
BWF Future Series tournament
