= 2021 European Mixed Team Badminton Championships =

International badminton competition

- Venue: Energia Areena
- Location: Vantaa, Finland
- Dates: 16 – 20 February 2021

Medalists
gold medal	Alexandra Bøje, Amalie Magelund, Anders Antonsen, Anders Skaarup Rasmussen, Freja Ravn, Kim Astrup, Line Christophersen, Mads Pieler Kolding, Maiken Fruergaard, Mathias Christiansen, Mia Blichfeldt, Niclas Nøhr, Viktor Axelsen	Denmark
silver medal	Anne Tran, Christo Popov, Delphine Delrue, Émilie Lefel, Julien Maio, Léa Palermo, Marie Batomene, Qi Xuefei, Ronan Labar, Thom Gicquel, Toma Junior Popov, Arnaud Merklé, Eloi Adam, Fabien Delrue, Léonice Huet, Margot Lambert, Vimala Hériau, William Villeger, Yaëlle Hoyaux	France
bronze medal	Fabian Roth, Franziska Volkmann, Isabel Herttrich, Johannes Pistorius, Jones Ralfy Jansen, Kilasu Ostermeyer, Mark Lamsfuß, Marvin Emil Seidel, Max Weißkirchen, Stine Küspert, Yvonne Li, Annabella Jäger, Ann-Kathrin Spöri, Daniel Hess, Kai Schäfer, Linda Efler, Miranda Wilson, Peter Käsbauer, Samuel Hsiao	Germany
bronze medal	Alina Davletova, Anastasiia Akchurina, Evgeniya Kosetskaya, Georgii Karpov, Ivan Sozonov, Olga Morozova, Rodion Alimov, Vladimir Ivanov, Vladimir Malkov, Anastasiia Shapovalova	Russia

The 2021 European Mixed Team Badminton Championships is held in Vantaa, Finland, between 16 and 20 February 2021 and organised by Badminton Europe and Badminton Finland. Milton Keynes in England was the original host for the championships, but withdrew due to financial issues related to COVID-19 pandemic and replaced by Finland.

== Qualification ==
=== Direct qualifiers ===
- Finland (Host country)
- Denmark (Reigning champion)

=== Qualification stage ===
The qualification stage was held between 9–12 December 2020 in 6 cities across Europe. Two of the qualification events in Germany and France had to be cancelled due to COVID-19 concerns.

Group	Host city	Venue	Qualified team	Teams failed to qualify
1	(England) Milton Keynes	National Badminton Centre	England	Estonia; Hungary; Sweden
2	(Belgium) Antwerp	YONEX Centre	Russia	Belgium; Poland; Switzerland
3	(Austria) Linz	Olympiazentrum Linz	Netherlands	Austria; Czech Republic; Slovenia
4	~~(Germany) Dessau~~; Cancelled	~~Anhalt Arena~~	Germany	Bulgaria; Isle of Man; Slovenia
5	~~(France) Aire-sur-la-Lys~~; Cancelled	~~Complexe sportif régional~~	France	Iceland; Italy
5	~~(France) Aire-sur-la-Lys~~; Cancelled	~~Complexe sportif régional~~	France	Ireland; Norway; Wales
6	(Portugal) Caldas da Rainha	Badminton High Performance Sports Centre	Scotland	Latvia; Portugal; Spain; Ukraine

§: Subgroup's winner.

- ^1: Cancelled due to the withdrawal of 3 out of 4 teams.
- ^2: Cancelled due to the qualification stage cannot be hosted in France or any of the other countries participating in this group.
- ^3: Lithuania withdrew from this qualification stage.

== Group stage ==
=== Group 1 ===
Pos	Team	Pld	W	L	MF	MA	MD	GF	GA	GD	PF	PA	PD	Pts	Qualification
1	Denmark	3	3	0	11	4	+7	23	11	+12	673	557	+116	3	Knockout Stage
2	Germany	3	2	1	11	4	+7	24	9	+15	645	525	+120	2	Knockout Stage
3	Scotland	3	1	2	6	9	−3	13	20	−7	578	628	−50	1	
4	Finland (H)	3	0	3	2	13	−11	6	26	−20	468	654	−186	0	

Source: TS
(H) Host
- Denmark vs. Finland

Denmark
5
Energia Areena, Court 1
16 February 2021, 18:00 UTC+2

Finland
0

			1	2	3
1	(Denmark) (Finland)	Viktor Axelsen; Joakim Oldorff	21; 11	21; 13
2	(Denmark) (Finland)	Line Christophersen; Nella Nyqvist	21; 13	21; 9
3	(Denmark) (Finland)	Mads Pieler Kolding / Anders Skaarup Rasmussen; Anton Monnberg / Jesper Paul	21; 13	21; 9
4	(Denmark) (Finland)	Amalie Magelund / Freja Ravn; Mathilda Lindholm / Jenny Nyström	21; 12	21; 10
5	(Denmark) (Finland)	Mathias Christiansen / Alexandra Bøje; Jesper Paul / Inalotta Suutarinen	21; 12	21; 16

- Scotland vs. Germany

Scotland
1
Energia Areena, Court 2
16 February 2021, 18:00 UTC+2

Germany
4

			1	2	3
1	(Scotland) (Germany)	Adam Hall / Julie MacPherson; Mark Lamsfuß / Isabel Herttrich	14; 21	13; 21
2	(Scotland) (Germany)	Joshua Apiliga; Max Weißkirchen	21; 17	21; 12
3	(Scotland) (Germany)	Rachel Sugden; Yvonne Li	7; 21	13; 21
4	(Scotland) (Germany)	Christopher Grimley / Adam Hall; Mark Lamsfuß / Marvin Emil Seidel	19; 21	9; 21
5	(Scotland) (Germany)	Julie MacPherson / Ciara Torrance; Isabel Herttrich / Kilasu Ostermeyer	12; 21	14; 21

- Denmark vs. Germany

Denmark
3
Energia Areena, Court 2
17 February 2021, 18:00 UTC+2

Germany
2

			1	2	3
1	(Denmark) (Germany)	Viktor Axelsen; Fabian Roth	21; 6	21; 9
2	(Denmark) (Germany)	Mia Blichfeldt; Yvonne Li	18; 21	18; 21
3	(Denmark) (Germany)	Mads Pieler Kolding / Anders Skaarup Rasmussen; Mark Lamsfuß / Marvin Emil Seidel	21; 18	15; 21	16; 21
4	(Denmark) (Germany)	Alexandra Bøje / Maiken Fruergaard; Isabel Herttrich / Stine Küspert	20; 22	23; 21	21; 17
5	(Denmark) (Germany)	Niclas Nøhr / Amalie Magelund; Jones Ralfy Jansen / Kilasu Ostermeyer	21; 19	14; 21	21; 16

- Scotland vs. Finland

Scotland
3
Energia Areena, Court 1
17 February 2021, 18:00 UTC+2

Finland
2

			1	2	3
1	(Scotland) (Finland)	Ciar Pringle; Kalle Koljonen	16; 21	13; 21
2	(Scotland) (Finland)	Holly Newall; Nella Nyqvist	19; 21	16; 21
3	(Scotland) (Finland)	Christopher Grimley / Adam Hall; Eetu Heino / Anton Kaisti	21; 17	21; 18
4	(Scotland) (Finland)	Julie MacPherson / Ciara Torrance; Mathilda Lindholm / Jenny Nyström	19; 21	21; 8	21; 11
5	(Scotland) (Finland)	Christopher Grimley / Eleanor O'Donnell; Anton Kaisti / Inalotta Suutarinen	22; 20	19; 21	21; 18

- Denmark vs. Scotland

Denmark
3
Energia Areena, Court 2
18 February 2021, 18:00 UTC+2

Scotland
2

			1	2	3
1	(Denmark) (Scotland)	Niclas Nøhr / Amalie Magelund; Adam Hall / Julie MacPherson	22; 24	16; 21
2	(Denmark) (Scotland)	Anders Antonsen; Joshua Apiliga	21; 10	22; 20
3	(Denmark) (Scotland)	Line Christophersen; Rachel Sugden	21; 15	25; 23
4	(Denmark) (Scotland)	Niclas Nøhr / Anders Skaarup Rasmussen; Christopher Grimley / Adam Hall	8; 21	18; 21
5	(Denmark) (Scotland)	Maiken Fruergaard / Freja Ravn; Julie MacPherson / Ciara Torrance	21; 15	18; 21	21; 15

- Germany vs. Finland

Germany
5
Energia Areena, Court 1
18 February 2021, 18:00 UTC+2

Finland
0

			1	2	3
1	(Germany) (Finland)	Fabian Roth; Kalle Koljonen	21; 11	21; 18
2	(Germany) (Finland)	Yvonne Li; Nella Nyqvist	21; 8	21; 9
3	(Germany) (Finland)	Johannes Pistorius / Marvin Emil Seidel; Eetu Heino / Anton Kaisti	21; 9	26; 24
4	(Germany) (Finland)	Isabel Herttrich / Stine Küspert; Mathilda Lindholm / Jenny Nyström	21; 6	21; 15
5	(Germany) (Finland)	Mark Lamsfuß / Franziska Volkmann; Anton Kaisti / Inalotta Suutarinen	21; 18	21; 14

=== Group 2 ===
Pos	Team	Pld	W	L	MF	MA	MD	GF	GA	GD	PF	PA	PD	Pts	Qualification
1	Russia	3	3	0	13	2	+11	26	7	+19	669	491	+178	3	Knockout Stage
2	France	3	2	1	8	7	+1	20	17	+3	705	637	+68	2	Knockout Stage
3	Netherlands	3	1	2	7	8	−1	15	17	−2	505	587	−82	1	
4	England	3	0	3	2	13	−11	7	27	−20	515	679	−164	0	

Source: TS
- England vs. Russia

England
0
Energia Areena, Court 2
16 February 2021, 13:00 UTC+2

Russia
5

			1	2	3
1	(England) (Russia)	Johnnie Torjussen; Vladimir Malkov	14; 21	18; 21
2	(England) (Russia)	Estelle Van Leeuwen; Evgeniya Kosetskaya	11; 21	16; 21
3	(England) (Russia)	Rory Easton / Ethan Van Leeuwen; Vladimir Ivanov / Ivan Sozonov	12; 21	10; 21
4	(England) (Russia)	Annie Lado / Jenny Moore; Anastasiia Akchurina / Olga Morozova	21; 18	12; 21	8; 21
5	(England) (Russia)	Callum Hemming / Jessica Pugh; Rodion Alimov / Alina Davletova	13; 21	17; 21

- France vs. Netherlands

France
3
Energia Areena, Court 1
16 February 2021, 13:00 UTC+2

Netherlands
2

			1	2	3
1	(France) (Netherlands)	Toma Junior Popov; Mark Caljouw	17; 21	21; 6	16; 21
2	(France) (Netherlands)	Qi Xuefei; Jaymie Laurens	21; 14	21; 7
3	(France) (Netherlands)	Ronan Labar / Julien Maio; Ruben Jille / Ties van der Lecq	21; 17	21; 13
4	(France) (Netherlands)	Émilie Lefel / Anne Tran; Debora Jille / Cheryl Seinen	13; 21	18; 21
5	(France) (Netherlands)	Thom Gicquel / Delphine Delrue; Robin Tabeling / Selena Piek	21; 18	10; 21	21; 19

- England vs. Netherlands

England
1
Energia Areena, Court 1
17 February 2021, 13:00 UTC+2

Netherlands
4

			1	2	3
1	(England) (Netherlands)	Harry Huang; Mark Caljouw	13; 21	11; 21
2	(England) (Netherlands)	Freya Redfearn; Nadia Choukri	21; 12	21; 6
3	(England) (Netherlands)	Matthew Clare / Gregory Mairs; Ruben Jille / Ties van der Lecq	16; 21	19; 21
4	(England) (Netherlands)	Lizzie Tolman / Victoria Williams; Debora Jille / Cheryl Seinen	15; 21	14; 21
5	(England) (Netherlands)	Callum Hemming / Jessica Pugh; Robin Tabeling / Selena Piek	18; 21	16; 21

- France vs. Russia

France
1
Energia Areena, Court 2
17 February 2021, 13:00 UTC+2

Russia
4

			1	2	3
1	(France) (Russia)	Toma Junior Popov; Vladimir Malkov	21; 16	11; 21	16; 21
2	(France) (Russia)	Qi Xuefei; Evgeniya Kosetskaya	21; 15	22; 20
3	(France) (Russia)	Ronan Labar / Julien Maio; Vladimir Ivanov / Ivan Sozonov	21; 17	16; 21	15; 21
4	(France) (Russia)	Émilie Lefel / Anne Tran; Anastasiia Akchurina / Olga Morozova	19; 21	21; 23
5	(France) (Russia)	Thom Gicquel / Delphine Delrue; Rodion Alimov / Alina Davletova	16; 21	20; 22

- England vs. France

England
1
Energia Areena, Court 1
18 February 2021, 13:00 UTC+2

France
4

			1	2	3
1	(England) (France)	Johnnie Torjussen; Christo Popov	21; 18	14; 21	26; 24
2	(England) (France)	Freya Redfearn; Marie Batomene	21; 14	14; 21	7; 21
3	(England) (France)	Rory Easton / Ethan Van Leeuwen; Ronan Labar / Julien Maio	17; 21	16; 21
4	(England) (France)	Annie Lado / Lizzie Tolman; Lea Palermo / Anne Tran	7; 21	10; 21
5	(England) (France)	Callum Hemming / Jessica Pugh; Thom Gicquel / Delphine Delrue	22; 20	14; 21	10; 21

- Netherlands vs. Russia

Netherlands
1
Energia Areena, Court 2
18 February 2021, 13:00 UTC+2

Russia
4

			1	2	3
1	(Netherlands) (Russia)	Mark Caljouw; Georgii Karpov	13; 17
2	(Netherlands) (Russia)	Jaymie Laurens; Evgeniya Kosetskaya	6; 21	5; 21
3	(Netherlands) (Russia)	Ruben Jille / Robin Tabeling; Vladimir Ivanov / Ivan Sozonov	10; 21	12; 21
4	(Netherlands) (Russia)	Debora Jille / Cheryl Seinen; Anastasiia Akchurina / Olga Morozova	21; 19	21; 15
5	(Netherlands) (Russia)	Robin Tabeling / Selena Piek; Rodion Alimov / Alina Davletova	14; 21	18; 21

== Knockout stage ==
Semi-finals
19 February, 18:00
Denmark	3
Germany	2
19 February, 13:00
France	3
Russia	2

Final
20 February, 15:00
Denmark	3
France	0

=== Semi-finals ===
France
3
Energia Areena, Court 1
19 February 2021, 13:00 UTC+2

Russia
2

			1	2	3
1	(France) (Russia)	Qi Xuefei; Evgeniya Kosetskaya	19; 21	14; 21
2	(France) (Russia)	Toma Junior Popov; Vladimir Malkov	14; 21	21; 17	21; 15
3	(France) (Russia)	Léa Palermo / Anne Tran; Alina Davletova / Evgeniya Kosetskaya	21; 18	23; 25	21; 11
4	(France) (Russia)	Ronan Labar / Julien Maio; Vladimir Ivanov / Ivan Sozonov	13; 21	10; 21
5	(France) (Russia)	Thom Gicquel / Delphine Delrue; Rodion Alimov / Alina Davletova	18; 21	21; 15	21; 9

Denmark
3
Energia Areena, Court 1
19 February 2021, 18:00 UTC+2

Germany
2

			1	2	3
1	(Denmark) (Germany)	Mathias Christiansen / Alexandra Bøje; Mark Lamsfuß / Isabel Herttrich	18; 21	17; 21
2	(Denmark) (Germany)	Viktor Axelsen; Max Weißkirchen	21; 13	21; 8
3	(Denmark) (Germany)	Mia Blichfeldt; Yvonne Li	21; 17	12; 21	21; 16
4	(Denmark) (Germany)	Kim Astrup / Anders Skaarup Rasmussen; Mark Lamsfuß / Marvin Emil Seidel	19; 21	5; 21
5	(Denmark) (Germany)	Maiken Fruergaard / Amalie Magelund; Isabel Herttrich / Kilasu Ostermeyer	21; 11	18; 21	21; 19

=== Final ===
Denmark
3
Energia Areena, Court 1
20 February 2021, 15:00 UTC+2

France
0

			1	2	3
1	(Denmark) (France)	Viktor Axelsen; Christo Popov	21; 16	21; 12
2	(Denmark) (France)	Mia Blichfeldt; Qi Xuefei	21; 18	21; 19
3	(Denmark) (France)	Kim Astrup / Anders Skaarup Rasmussen; Ronan Labar / Julien Maio	21; 12	21; 14
4	(Denmark) (France)	Maiken Fruergaard / Amalie Magelund; Léa Palermo / Anne Tran				not played
5	(Denmark) (France)	Mathias Christiansen / Alexandra Bøje; Thom Gicquel / Delphine Delrue				not played
