= Emma Moszczynski =

German badminton player (born 2001)

Personal information
- Born: 7 June 2001 (age 25) Hamburg, Germany

Sport
- Country: Germany
- Sport: Badminton
- Handedness: Right

Women's & mixed doubles
- Highest ranking: 35 (WD with Stine Küspert 27 December 2022); 117 (XD with Bjarne Geiss 17 March 2020)
- Current ranking: 35 (WD with Stine Küspert 27 December 2022)
- BWF profile
Medal record
Women's badminton
Representing Germany
European Women's Team Championships
Silver medal – second place	2020 Liévin	Women's team
European Mixed Team Championships
Bronze medal – third place	2023 Aire-sur-la-Lys	Mixed team
European Junior Championships
Silver medal – second place	2018 Tallinn	Mixed team
Bronze medal – third place	2018 Tallinn	Mixed doubles

Emma Moszczynski (born 7 June 2001) is a German badminton player. She clinched her first international title at Ukraine International in 2021, pairing Stine Küspert.

== Achievement ==
=== European Junior Championships ===
Mixed doubles
Year	Venue	Partner	Opponent	Score	Result
2018	Kalev Sports Hall; Tallinn, Estonia	(Germany) Lukas Resch	(Netherlands) Wessel van der Aar (Netherlands) Alyssa Tirtosentono	17–21, 21–15, 13–21	Bronze

=== BWF World Tour (1 runner-up) ===
The BWF World Tour, which was announced on 19 March 2017 and implemented in 2018, is a series of elite badminton tournaments sanctioned by the Badminton World Federation (BWF). The BWF World Tours are divided into levels of World Tour Finals, Super 1000, Super 750, Super 500, Super 300 (part of the HSBC World Tour), and the BWF Tour Super 100.

Women's doubles
Year	Tournament	Level	Partner	Opponent	Score	Result
2022	Orléans Masters	Super 100	(Germany) Stine Küspert	(Bulgaria) Gabriela Stoeva (Bulgaria) Stefani Stoeva	15–21, 14–21	(silver) Runner-up

=== BWF International Challenge/Series (6 titles, 2 runners-up) ===
Women's doubles
Year	Tournament	Partner	Opponent	Score	Result
2021	Ukraine International	(Germany) Stine Küspert	(Ukraine) Mariia Stoliarenko (Ukraine) Yelyzaveta Zharka	21–18, 19–21, 21–15	(gold) Winner
2021	Italian International	(Germany) Stine Küspert	(Germany) Annabella Jäger (Germany) Leona Michalski	21–9, 21–10	(gold) Winner
2022	Ukraine Open	(Germany) Stine Küspert	(Ukraine) Mariia Stoliarenko (Ukraine) Yelyzaveta Zharka	21–18, 21–12	(gold) Winner

Mixed doubles
Year	Tournament	Partner	Opponent	Score	Result
2021	Ukraine International	(Germany) Johannes Pistorius	(Malaysia) Yap Roy King (Malaysia) Valeree Siow	19–21, 12–21	(silver) Runner-up
2026	Hungarian Future Series	(Germany) Jan Colin Völker	(Slovenia) Miha Ivančič (Slovenia) Anja Jordan	21–13, 23–21	(gold) Winner
2026	Austrian Open	(Germany) Jan Colin Völker	(India) Sathish Karunakaran (India) Zenith Abbigail	19–21, 21–13, 22–20	(gold) Winner
2026	Italian Open	(Germany) Jan Colin Völker	(Germany) Simon Krax (Germany) Amelie Lehmann	21–17, 21–13	(gold) Winner
2026	Czech Open	(Germany) Jan Colin Völker	(Denmark) Jesper Toft (Denmark) Amalie Cecilie Kudsk	12–21, 13–21	(silver) Runner-up

BWF International Challenge tournament
BWF International Series tournament
BWF Future Series tournament
