= 2018 European Junior Badminton Championships =

Tournament details
- Dates: 7 – 16 September 2018
- Venue: Kalev Sports Hall
- Location: Tallinn, Estonia

The 2018 European Junior Badminton Championships were held at the Kalev Sports Hall in Tallinn, Estonia, between 7-16 September 2018.

== Medalists ==
Event	Gold	Silver	Bronze
Boys' singles	(France) Arnaud Merklé	(France) Christo Popov	(Germany) Lukas Resch
Boys' singles	(France) Arnaud Merklé	(France) Christo Popov	(Republic of Ireland) Nhat Nguyen
Girls' singles	(Denmark) Line Christophersen	(Denmark) Amalie Schulz	(Hungary) Réka Madarász
Girls' singles	(Denmark) Line Christophersen	(Denmark) Amalie Schulz	(Hungary) Vivien Sándorházi
Boys' doubles	(France) Fabien Delrue (France) William Villeger	(Scotland) Christopher Grimley (Scotland) Matthew Grimley	(Denmark) Mads Muurholm (Denmark) Mads Vestergaard
Boys' doubles	(France) Fabien Delrue (France) William Villeger	(Scotland) Christopher Grimley (Scotland) Matthew Grimley	(France) Maxime Briot (France) Kenji Lovang
Girls' doubles	(Turkey) Bengisu Erçetin (Turkey) Nazlıcan İnci	(Denmark) Amalie Magelund (Denmark) Freja Ravn	(Turkey) Ece Sare Başakın (Turkey) Zehra Erdem
Girls' doubles	(Turkey) Bengisu Erçetin (Turkey) Nazlıcan İnci	(Denmark) Amalie Magelund (Denmark) Freja Ravn	(Ukraine) Anastasiya Prozorova (Ukraine) Valeriya Rudakova
Mixed doubles	(France) Fabien Delrue (France) Juliette Moinard	(Netherlands) Wessel van der Aar (Netherlands) Alyssa Tirtosentono	(Germany) Lukas Resch (Germany) Emma Moszczynski
Mixed doubles	(France) Fabien Delrue (France) Juliette Moinard	(Netherlands) Wessel van der Aar (Netherlands) Alyssa Tirtosentono	(Denmark) Mads Vestergaard (Denmark) Christine Busch
Teams	France; Maxime Briot; Calixte Courbon; Fabien Delrue; Yanis Gaudin; Kenji Lovang; Arnaud Merklé; Christo Popov; Lalaina Ramanana-Rahary; Leo van Gysel; William Villeger; Sharone Bauer; Camille Benetreau; Marig Brouxel; Romane Cloteaux-Foucault; Ainoa Desmons; Charlotte Ganci; Léonice Huet; Marion Le Turdu; Juliette Moinard; Flavie Vallet	Denmark; Rasmus Espersen; Sebastian Grønbjerg; Magnus Johannesen; Mads Muurholm; Mads Sørensen; Mads Vestergaard; Nicolaj Wolf; Christine Busch; Line Christophersen; Sophia Grundtvig; Amalie Magelund; Freja Ravn; Amalie Schulz	Germany; Leander Adam; Brian Holtschke; Matthias Kicklitz; Niclas Kirchgeßner; Lukas Resch; Aaron Sonnenschein; Maria Kuse; Leona Michalski; Emma Moszczynski; Nguyen Thuc Phuong; Jule Petrikowski; Ann-Kathrin Spöri; Miranda Wilson
Teams	France; Maxime Briot; Calixte Courbon; Fabien Delrue; Yanis Gaudin; Kenji Lovang; Arnaud Merklé; Christo Popov; Lalaina Ramanana-Rahary; Leo van Gysel; William Villeger; Sharone Bauer; Camille Benetreau; Marig Brouxel; Romane Cloteaux-Foucault; Ainoa Desmons; Charlotte Ganci; Léonice Huet; Marion Le Turdu; Juliette Moinard; Flavie Vallet	Denmark; Rasmus Espersen; Sebastian Grønbjerg; Magnus Johannesen; Mads Muurholm; Mads Sørensen; Mads Vestergaard; Nicolaj Wolf; Christine Busch; Line Christophersen; Sophia Grundtvig; Amalie Magelund; Freja Ravn; Amalie Schulz	Russia; Lev Barinov; Georgii Karpov; Amir Khamidulin; Egor Kholkin; Dmitrii Klimenko; Georgii Lebedev; Vladimir Shipilenko; Anastasiia Boiarun; Viktoriia Kozyreva; Anastasiia Kurdyukova; Anastasiia Pustinskaia; Anastasiia Shapovalova; Mariia Sukhova

== Medal table ==
Rank	Nation	Gold	Silver	Bronze	Total
1	France (FRA)	4	1	1	6
2	Denmark (DEN)	1	3	2	6
3	Turkey (TUR)	1	0	1	2
4	Netherlands (NED)	0	1	0	1
4	Scotland (SCO)	0	1	0	1
6	Germany (GER)	0	0	3	3
7	Hungary (HUN)	0	0	2	2
8	Ireland (IRL)	0	0	1	1
8	Russia (RUS)	0	0	1	1
8	Ukraine (UKR)	0	0	1	1
Totals (10 entries)		6	6	12	24
