= Freja Ravn =

Danish badminton player (born 2000)

Personal information
- Born: Freja Ravn Nielsen; 17 February 2000 (age 26) Copenhagen, Denmark
- Years active: 2016–present
- Height: 1.68 m (5 ft 6 in)

Sport
- Country: Denmark
- Sport: Badminton
- Handedness: Right

Women's doubles
- Highest ranking: 22 (with Amalie Magelund 27 September 2022)
- BWF profile
Medal record
Women's badminton
Representing Denmark
European Championships
Bronze medal – third place	2022 Madrid	Women's doubles
European Women's Team Championships
Gold medal – first place	2020 Liévin	Women's team
European Mixed Team Championships
Gold medal – first place	2021 Vantaa	Mixed team
European Junior Championships
Silver medal – second place	2018 Tallinn	Girls' doubles
Silver medal – second place	2018 Tallinn	Mixed team
Bronze medal – third place	2017 Mulhouse	Girls' doubles
Bronze medal – third place	2017 Mulhouse	Mixed team

Freja Ravn Nielsen (born 17 February 2000) is a Danish badminton player who affiliates with KMB2010 club in Kastrup, specializing in doubles play. She started playing badminton at the age of 6 in Dragør badminton club, and entered the national team since 2016. As a junior player, she was the silver medalists at the 2018 European Junior Championships in the team and girls' doubles events.

== Achievements ==
=== European Championships ===
Women's doubles
Year	Venue	Partner	Opponent	Score	Result
2022	Polideportivo Municipal Gallur; Madrid, Spain	(Denmark) Amalie Magelund	(Bulgaria) Gabriela Stoeva (Bulgaria) Stefani Stoeva	11–21, 12–21	Bronze

=== European Junior Championships ===
Girls' doubles
Year	Venue	Partner	Opponent	Score	Result
2017	Centre Sportif Regional d'Alsace; Mulhouse, France	(Denmark) Amalie Magelund	(Sweden) Emma Karlsson (Sweden) Johanna Magnusson	12–21, 17–21	Bronze
2018	Kalev Sports Hall; Tallinn, Estonia	(Denmark) Amalie Magelund	(Turkey) Bengisu Erçetin (Turkey) Nazlıcan İnci	21–14, 17–21, 17–21	Silver

=== BWF World Tour ===
The BWF World Tour, which was announced on 19 March 2017 and implemented in 2018, is a series of elite badminton tournaments sanctioned by the Badminton World Federation (BWF). The BWF World Tours are divided into levels of World Tour Finals, Super 1000, Super 750, Super 500, Super 300 (part of the HSBC World Tour), and the BWF Tour Super 100.

Women's doubles
Year	Tournament	Level	Partner	Opponent	Score	Result
2020	SaarLorLux Open	Super 100	(Denmark) Amalie Magelund	(Bulgaria) Gabriela Stoeva (Bulgaria) Stefani Stoeva	8–21, 11–21	(silver) Runner-up
2021	Spain Masters	Super 300	(Denmark) Amalie Magelund	(Indonesia) Yulfira Barkah (Indonesia) Febby Valencia Dwijayanti Gani	16–21, 14–21	(silver) Runner-up

=== BWF International Challenge/Series ===
Women's doubles
Year	Tournament	Partner	Opponent	Score	Result
2018	Dutch International	(Denmark) Amalie Magelund	(Chinese Taipei) Chang Ya-lan (Chinese Taipei) Cheng Wen-hsing	18–21, 25–27	(silver) Runner-up
2018	Bulgaria International	(Denmark) Amalie Magelund	(Bulgaria) Gabriela Stoeva (Bulgaria) Stefani Stoeva	16–21, 19–21	(silver) Runner-up
2019	Swedish Open	(Denmark) Amalie Magelund	(Sweden) Emma Karlsson (Sweden) Johanna Magnusson	21–15, 12–21, 21–17	(gold) Winner
2019	Dutch International	(Denmark) Amalie Magelund	(Netherlands) Debora Jille (Netherlands) Alyssa Tirtosentono	22–24, 21–19, 21–11	(gold) Winner
2019	Polish International	(Denmark) Amalie Magelund	(Sweden) Emma Karlsson (Sweden) Johanna Magnusson	15–21, 21–15, 21–15	(gold) Winner
2019	Irish Open	(Denmark) Amalie Magelund	(France) Delphine Delrue (France) Léa Palermo	21–18, 21–11	(gold) Winner
2019	Scottish Open	(Denmark) Amalie Magelund	(Denmark) Julie Finne-Ipsen (Denmark) Mai Surrow	17–21, 21–15, 21–6	(gold) Winner
2021	Denmark Masters	(Denmark) Amalie Magelund	(India) Ashwini Ponnappa (India) N. Sikki Reddy	15–21, 21–19, 21–14	(gold) Winner

BWF International Challenge tournament
BWF International Series tournament
BWF Future Series tournament
