= Juliette Moinard =

French badminton player

Personal information
- Born: 25 June 2001 (age 25) Aix-en-Provence, France

Sport
- Country: France
- Sport: Badminton

Women's & mixed doubles
- Highest ranking: 112 (WD with Sharone Bauer 21 January 2020); 253 (XD with Julien Maio 17 March 2020)
- BWF profile
Medal record
Women's badminton
Representing France
European Junior Championships
| Gold medal – first place | 2017 Mulhouse | Mixed team |
| Gold medal – first place | 2018 Tallinn | Mixed doubles |
| Gold medal – first place | 2018 Tallinn | Mixed team |

Juliette Moinard (born 25 June 2001) is a French badminton player who competes in international level events. Her highest achievement is winning two gold medals at the 2018 European Junior Badminton Championships in Tallinn partnering with Fabien Delrue in the mixed doubles and she has won multiple titles with him. She has also played in the BWF World Junior Championships where she reached the round of 16 in the mixed doubles in 2018.

== Achievements ==
=== European Junior Championships ===
Mixed doubles
| Year | Venue | Partner | Opponent | Score | Result |
|---|---|---|---|---|---|
| 2018 | Kalev Sports Hall; Tallinn, Estonia | (France) Fabien Delrue | (Netherlands) Wessel van der Aar (Netherlands) Alyssa Tirtosentono | 21–16, 21–16 | Gold |

=== BWF International ===
Women's doubles
| Year | Tournament | Partner | Opponent | Score | Result |
|---|---|---|---|---|---|
| 2018 | Latvia International | (France) Ainoa Desmons | (Estonia) Kristin Kuuba (Estonia) Helina Rüütel | 17–21, 16–21 | (silver) Runner-up |

Mixed doubles
| Year | Tournament | Partner | Opponent | Score | Result |
|---|---|---|---|---|---|
| 2017 | Latvia International | (France) Fabien Delrue | (Czech Republic) Filip Budzel (Czech Republic) Tereza Švábíková | 21–12, 19–21, 21–11 | (gold) Winner |

BWF International Challenge tournament
BWF International Series tournament
BWF Future Series tournament
