= William Villeger =

French badminton player (born 2000)

Personal information
- Born: 22 October 2000 (age 26) Martigues, Provence-Alpes-Côte d'Azur, France
- Height: 1.90 m (6 ft 3 in)

Sport
- Country: France
- Sport: Badminton
- Handedness: Right

Men's & mixed doubles
- Highest ranking: 28 (MD with Fabien Delrue, 20 December 2022); 33 (XD with Anne Tran, 17 January 2023)
- Current ranking: 37 (MD with Julien Maio, 10 November 2026)
- BWF profile
Medal record
Men's badminton
Representing France
Thomas Cup
Silver medal – second place	2026 Horsens	Men's team
European Mixed Team Championships
Silver medal – second place	2021 Vantaa	Mixed team
European Men's Team Championships
Bronze medal – third place	2020 Liévin	Men's team
European Junior Championships
Gold medal – first place	2018 Tallinn	Boys' doubles
Gold medal – first place	2018 Tallinn	Mixed team

William Villeger (born 22 October 2000) is a French badminton player affiliated with ASPTT Strasbourg club. He won the European junior championships in boys' doubles event in 2018 and won another gold in team event too. He was part of the French team that made history in badminton by secured the silver medal at the Thomas Cup.

== Achievements ==
=== European Junior Championships ===
Boys' doubles
Year	Venue	Partner	Opponent	Score	Result
2018	Kalev Sports Hall; Tallinn, Estonia	(France) Fabien Delrue	(Scotland) Christopher Grimley (Scotland) Matthew Grimley	21–18, 21–15	Gold

=== BWF World Tour (1 runner-up) ===
The BWF World Tour, which was announced on 19 March 2017 and implemented in 2018, is a series of elite badminton tournaments sanctioned by the Badminton World Federation (BWF). The BWF World Tours are divided into levels of World Tour Finals, Super 1000, Super 750, Super 500, Super 300, and the BWF Tour Super 100.

Men's doubles
Year	Tournament	Level	Partner	Opponent	Score	Result	Ref.
2026	German Open	Super 300	(France) Julien Maio	(China) Chen Boyang (China) Liu Yi	21–17, 15–21, 12–21	(silver) Runner-up	

=== BWF International Challenge/Series (8 titles, 10 runners-up) ===
Men's doubles
Year	Tournament	Partner	Opponent	Score	Result
2018	Latvia International	(France) Fabien Delrue	(Denmark) Emil Lauritzen (Denmark) Mads Muurholm	21–12, 21–17	(gold) Winner
2023	Estonian International	(France) Julien Maio	(Japan) Shuntaro Mezaki (Japan) Haruya Nishida	19–21, 14–21	(silver) Runner-up
2023	Portugal International	(France) Julien Maio	(Japan) Kazuhiro Ichikawa (Japan) Daiki Umayahara	16–21, 21–15, 21–13	(gold) Winner
2024	Réunion Open	(France) Julien Maio	(India) Prakash Raj (India) Gouse Shaik	21–9, 21–14	(gold) Winner
2024	Mauritius International	(France) Julien Maio	(Germany) Malik Bourakkadi (Germany) Marvin Datko	18–21, 21–10, 21–6	(gold) Winner
2024	Belgian International	(France) Julien Maio	(Netherlands) Ties van der Lecq (Netherlands) Brian Wassink	17–21, 20–22	(silver) Runner-up
2024	Turkey International	(France) Julien Maio	(France) Éloi Adam (France) Léo Rossi	21–15, 17–21, 21–13	(gold) Winner
2026	Valence Alpes International	(France) Maël Cattoen	(France) Éloi Adam (France) Léo Rossi	21–19, 12–21, 21–19	(gold) Winner
2026	Irish Open	(France) Julien Maio	(South Korea) Jin Sung-ik (South Korea) Lee Hyeong-woo	20–22, 21–11, 17–21	(silver) Runner-up

Mixed doubles
Year	Tournament	Partner	Opponent	Score	Result
2019	Dutch International	(France) Vimala Hériau	(Denmark) Mathias Thyrri (Denmark) Elisa Melgaard	14–21, 21–16, 12–21	(silver) Runner-up
2019	Czech International	(France) Sharone Bauer	(Czech Republic) Jakub Bitman (Czech Republic) Alžběta Bášová	15–21, 21–23	(silver) Runner-up
2019	Norwegian International	(France) Sharone Bauer	(Denmark) Mads Emil Christensen (Sweden) Emma Karlsson	19–21, 21–16, 12–21	(silver) Runner-up
2021	Portugal International	(France) Sharone Bauer	(England) Callum Hemming (England) Jessica Pugh	18–21, 21–19, 15–21	(silver) Runner-up
2021	Austrian International	(France) Sharone Bauer	(Malaysia) Choong Hon Jian (Malaysia) Toh Ee Wei	21–16, 9–21, 19–21	(silver) Runner-up
2021	Polish International	(France) Anne Tran	(Poland) Paweł Śmiłowski (Poland) Wiktoria Adamek	21–15, 21–17	(gold) Winner
2021	Welsh International	(France) Anne Tran	(England) Callum Hemming (England) Jessica Pugh	21–15, 17–21, 21–16	(gold) Winner
2024	Réunion Open	(France) Flavie Vallet	(France) Julien Maio (France) Léa Palermo	21–23, 12–21	(silver) Runner-up
2024	Mauritius International	(France) Flavie Vallet	(France) Julien Maio (France) Léa Palermo	11–21, 14–21	(silver) Runner-up

BWF International Challenge tournament
BWF International Series tournament
BWF Future Series tournament

=== BWF Junior International (1 title, 3 runners-up) ===
Boys' doubles
Year	Tournament	Partner	Opponent	Score	Result
2018	Spanish Junior International	(France) Fabien Delrue	(France) Maxime Briot (France) Kenji Lovang	21–14, 16–21, 24–22	(gold) Winner
2018	Danish Junior Cup	(France) Fabien Delrue	(France) Maxime Briot (France) Kenji Lovang	15–21, 21–15, 21–23	(silver) Runner-up

Mixed doubles
Year	Tournament	Partner	Opponent	Score	Result
2017	Hungarian Junior International	(France) Marig Brouxel	(Poland) Robert Cybulski (Poland) Wiktoria Dąbczyńska	11–7, 7–11, 4–11, 11–4, 7–11	(silver) Runner-up
2017	Three borders Junior International	(France) Melanie Potin	(Switzerland) Julien Scheiwiller (Switzerland) Jenjira Stadelmann	19–21, 9–21	(silver) Runner-up

BWF Junior International Grand Prix tournament
BWF Junior International Challenge tournament
BWF Junior International Series tournament
BWF Junior Future Series tournament
