= Fabien Delrue =

French badminton player (born 2000)

Personal information
- Born: 22 June 2000 (age 26) Sarcelles, France
- Height: 1.82 m (6 ft 0 in)

Sport
- Country: France
- Sport: Badminton
- Handedness: Right

Men's & mixed doubles
- Highest ranking: 28 (MD with William Villeger 20 December 2022); 72 (XD with Vimala Hériau 2 February 2021)
- Current ranking: 44 (MD with William Villeger) (31 January 2023)
- BWF profile
Medal record
Men's badminton
Representing France
European Mixed Team Championships
Silver medal – second place	2021 Vantaa	Mixed team
European Men's Team Championships
Bronze medal – third place	2020 Liévin	Men's team
European Junior Championships
Gold medal – first place	2017 Mulhouse	Mixed team
Gold medal – first place	2018 Tallinn	Mixed doubles
Gold medal – first place	2018 Tallinn	Boys' doubles
Gold medal – first place	2018 Tallinn	Mixed team

Fabien Delrue (born 22 June 2000) is a French badminton player. He won the European junior championships in boys' and mixed doubles events in 2018 and won another gold in team event also. He was also the bronze medalist in European U17 Championships team event in 2016.

== Achievements ==
=== European Junior Championships ===
Boys' doubles
Year	Venue	Partner	Opponent	Score	Result
2018	Kalev Sports Hall; Tallinn, Estonia	(France) William Villeger	(Scotland) Christopher Grimley (Scotland) Matthew Grimley	21–18, 21–15	Gold

Mixed doubles
Year	Venue	Partner	Opponent	Score	Result
2018	Kalev Sports Hall; Tallinn, Estonia	(France) Juliette Moinard	(Netherlands) Wessel van der Aar (Netherlands) Alyssa Tirtosentono	21–16, 21–16	Gold

=== BWF International Challenge/Series (3 titles, 1 runner-up) ===
Men's doubles
Year	Tournament	Partner	Opponent	Score	Result
2018	Latvia International	(France) William Villeger	(Denmark) Emil Lauritzen (Denmark) Mads Muurholm	21–12, 21–17	(gold) Winner

Mixed doubles
Year	Tournament	Partner	Opponent	Score	Result
2017	Latvia International	(France) Juliette Moinard	(Czech Republic) Filip Budzel (Czech Republic) Tereza Švábíková	21–12, 19–21, 21–11	(gold) Winner
2019	Hellas Open	(France) Vimala Hériau	(Poland) Paweł Śmiłowski (Poland) Magdalena Świerczyńska	17–21, 21–19, 21–15	(gold) Winner
2019	Kharkiv International	(France) Vimala Hériau	(Poland) Paweł Śmiłowski (Poland) Magdalena Świerczyńska	20–22, 18–21	(silver) Runner-up

BWF International Challenge tournament
BWF International Series tournament
BWF Future Series tournament

=== BWF Junior International (4 titles, 7 runners-up) ===
Boys' doubles
Year	Tournament	Partner	Opponent	Score	Result
2015	Portuguese Junior International	(France) Maxime Briot	(France) Marc Laporte (France) Léo Rossi	21–23, 15–21	(silver) Runner-up
2016	Romanian Junior International	(France) Maxime Briot	(France) Eloi Adam (France) Samy Corvée	21–23, 17–21	(silver) Runner-up
2017	Spanish Junior International	(France) Maxime Briot	(Switzerland) David Orteu (Switzerland) Julien Scheiwiller	21–13, 21–17	(gold) Winner
2017	Italian Junior International	(France) Maxime Briot	(Italy) Fabio Caponio (Italy) Giovanni Toti	21–12, 21–12	(gold) Winner
2017	3 Borders Junior International	(France) Maxime Briot	(France) Eloi Adam (France) Samy Corvée	21–19, 18–21, 13–21	(silver) Runner-up
2018	Spanish Junior International	(France) William Villeger	(France) Maxime Briot (France) Kenji Lovang	21–14, 16–21, 24–22	(gold) Winner
2018	Danish Junior Cup	(France) William Villeger	(France) Maxime Briot (France) Kenji Lovang	15–21, 21–15, 21–23	(silver) Runner-up

Mixed doubles
Year	Tournament	Partner	Opponent	Score	Result
2017	Spanish Junior International	(France) Florine Dupont	(France) Maxime Briot (France) Marion Le Turdu	21–23, 17–21	(silver) Runner-up
2017	Italian Junior International	(France) Juliette Moinard	(France) Maxime Briot (France) Marion Le Turdu	16–21, 21–23	(silver) Runner-up
2018	Spanish Junior International	(France) Juliette Moinard	(Brazil) Fabricio Farias (Brazil) Jaqueline Lima	21–16, 21–15	(gold) Winner
2018	Danish Junior Cup	(France) Juliette Moinard	(Denmark) Jonas Jæger (Denmark) Amalie Magelund	22–20, 17–21, 18–21	(silver) Runner-up

BWF Junior International Grand Prix tournament
BWF Junior International Challenge tournament
BWF Junior International Series tournament
BWF Junior Future Series tournament
