= Franziska Volkmann =

German badminton player (born 1994)

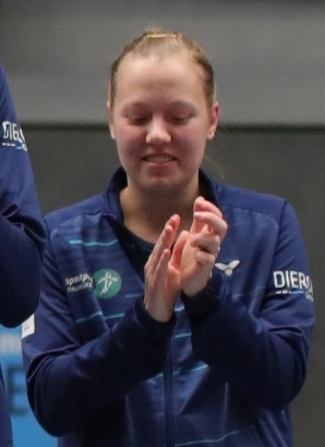
- Volkmann in 2025

Personal information
- Born: 4 April 1994 (age 32) Mölln, Germany
- Height: 1.63 m (5 ft 4 in)
- Spouse: Patrick Scheiel (m. 2024)

Sport
- Country: Germany
- Sport: Badminton
- Handedness: Right
- Coached by: Jacek Hankiewicz; Carsten Radke

Women's & mixed doubles
- Highest ranking: 78 (WD with Kira Kattenbeck, 9 October 2014); 58 (XD with Patrick Volkmann, 27 December 2022)
- Current ranking: 85 (XD with Patrick Volkmann, 5 May 2026)
- BWF profile
Medal record
Women's badminton
Representing Germany
European Women's Team Championships
Silver medal – second place	2020 Liévin	Women's team
European Mixed Team Championships
Bronze medal – third place	2021 Vantaa	Mixed team
Bronze medal – third place	2023 Aire-sur-la-Lys	Mixed team
Bronze medal – third place	2025 Baku	Mixed team
European Junior Championships
Bronze medal – third place	2013 Ankara	Mixed doubles
Bronze medal – third place	2013 Ankara	Mixed team

Franziska Volkmann (born 4 April 1994) is a German badminton player. She won bronze medals at the 2013 European Junior Championships in the mixed doubles and team events.

== Personal life ==
Volkmann married her mixed doubles partner, Patrick Scheiel, in the summer of 2024.

== Achievements ==
=== European Junior Championships ===
Mixed doubles
Year	Venue	Partner	Opponent	Score	Result
2013	ASKI Sport Hall; Ankara, Turkey	(Germany) Mark Lamsfuß	(Denmark) David Daugaard (Denmark) Maiken Fruergaard	11–21, 21–19, 12–21	Bronze

=== BWF International Challenge/Series (1 title, 2 runners-up) ===
Women's doubles
Year	Tournament	Partner	Opponent	Score	Result
2015	Romanian International	(Germany) Kira Kattenbeck	(Germany) Barbara Bellenberg (Germany) Ramona Hacks	15–21, 13–21	(silver) Runner-up

Mixed doubles
Year	Tournament	Partner	Opponent	Score	Result
2022	Croatia Open	(Germany) Patrick Scheiel	(England) Jonty Russ (England) Sian Kelly	21–18, 20–22, 16–21	(silver) Runner-up
2023	Luxembourg Open	(Germany) Patrick Scheiel	(Denmark) Andreas Søndergaard (Denmark) Iben Bergstein	25–23, 21–17	(gold) Winner

BWF International Challenge tournament
BWF International Series tournament
BWF Future Series tournament
