= Rachael Darragh =

Irish badminton player (born 1998)

Personal information
- Nationality: Irish
- Born: 24 September 1997 (age 29) Letterkenny, Ireland
- Height: 1.55 m (5 ft 1 in)
- Weight: 56 kg (123 lb)

Sport
- Sport: Badminton
- Handedness: Right

Women's singles & doubles
- Highest ranking: 59 (WS, 24 October 2023); 67 (WD with Sara Boyle, 17 November 2016); 74 (XD with Paul Reynolds, 25 October 2022)
- Current ranking: 68 (WS, 16 July 2024)
- BWF profile

Rachael Darragh (born 24 September 1997) is a badminton player who represented Northern Ireland at two Commonwealth Games and is a seven-time Irish champion.

== Biography ==
Darragh trained at the Raphoe Badminton Club in Raphoe in East Donegal. She won the girls' singles bronze medal at the 2012 UK School Games held in London. At the same year, she became the runner-up of 2012 Fyffes Irish Future Series in the women's doubles event with her partner Alannah Stephenson. Darragh competed at the 2015 Baku and 2019 Minsk European Games.

Darragh also represented Northern Ireland at the 2018 Commonwealth Games in Gold Coast, Australia and the 2022 Commonwealth Games in Birmingham.

She competed for Ireland at the 2024 Summer Olympics.

Darragh is a seven-time Irish champion at the Irish National Badminton Championships, winning the Irish women's singles title four times, the women's doubles twice and the mixed doubles once.

Darragh graduated from the Royal and Prior School in Raphoe, and studied leisure management at the Dublin Institute of Technology (DIT).

== Achievements ==
=== BWF International Challenge/Series (1 title, 3 runners-up) ===
Women's singles
Year	Tournament	Opponent	Score	Result
2021	Lithuanian International	(India) Malvika Bansod	14–21, 11–21	(silver) Runner-up

Women's doubles
Year	Tournament	Partner	Opponent	Score	Result
2012	Irish International	(Republic of Ireland) Alannah Stephenson	(Republic of Ireland) Sinead Chambers (Republic of Ireland) Jennie King	18–21, 14–21	(silver) Runner-up
2020	Portugal International	(Republic of Ireland) Sara Boyle	(Scotland) Lauren Middleton (Scotland) Holly Newall	20–22, 23–25	(silver) Runner-up

Mixed doubles
Year	Tournament	Partner	Opponent	Score	Result
2026	Hellas International	(Republic of Ireland) Scott Guildea	(Switzerland) Nils Harzenmoser (Switzerland) Anic Metzger	21–15, 21–19	(gold) Winner

BWF International Challenge tournament
BWF International Series tournament
BWF Future Series tournament
