= Alyssa Tirtosentono =

Dutch badminton player (born 2000)

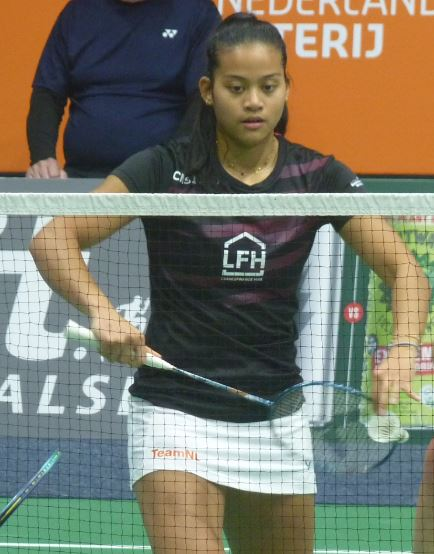

Personal information
- Born: 29 May 2000 (age 26) The Hague, Netherlands
- Height: 1.70 m (5 ft 7 in)

Sport
- Country: Netherlands
- Sport: Badminton
- Handedness: Right

Women's & mixed doubles
- Highest ranking: 39 (WD with Imke van der Aar 8 November 2022); 101 (XD with Brian Wassink 3 January 2023)
- BWF profile
Medal record
Women's badminton
Representing Netherlands
European Mixed Team Championships
Bronze medal – third place	2019 Copenhagen	Mixed team
European Junior Championships
Silver medal – second place	2018 Tallinn	Mixed doubles

Alyssa Tirtosentono (born 29 May 2000) is a Dutch badminton player. She won a silver medal at the 2018 European Junior Championships.

== Career ==
Tirtosentono came from a badminton family, who have a Surinamese Javanese background. She started to playing badminton with her late grandfather, Press, who was a badminton coach and veteran champion, while her late father, Steven, was also a player and a huge badminton fan. At the age of 17, she started training in the NSF Sportcentrum Papendal, where she also used to live. In the Dutch Eredivisie league Alyssa is playing since a long time for her club DKC in the Hague, after a short spell at another Dutch club BC Dropshot. While in Denmark for some seasons she plays competition for Team Skælskør - Slagelse (TSS). She is also head trainer for the badminton club Appoldro in Apeldoorn, trainer at Badminton Club Phido in Doetinchem and once a week trainer of the juniors at Wageningen in the Netherlands.

Her specialty is in the doubles events, where together with her previous doubles partner Imke van der Aar she won the Spanish International 2021 and reached the semi-finals of the Dutch Open 2021.

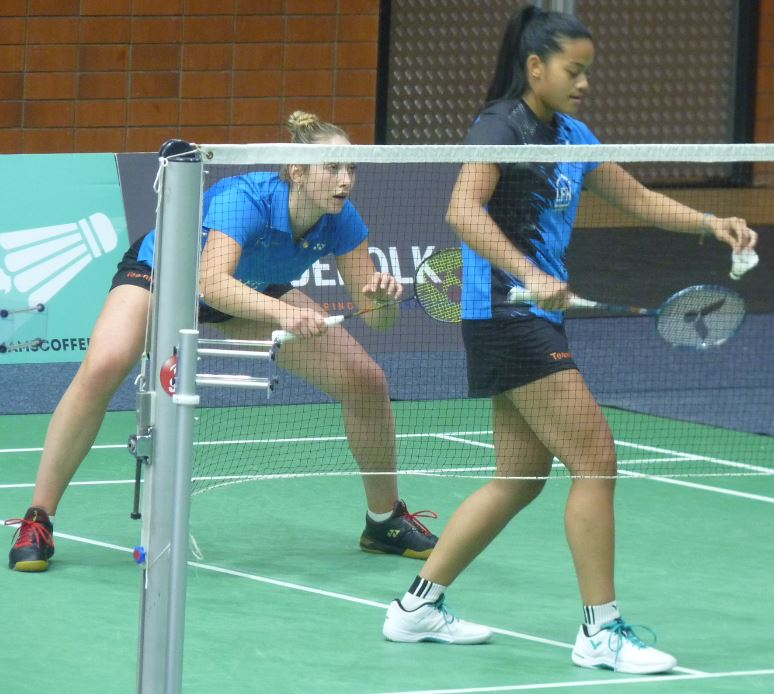
Alyssa Tirtosentono & Imke van der Aar (NED)

Together with her former partner Kirsten de Wit she won two events: the Malta International 2022 and the Luxembourg Open 2023. In the Mixed Doubles event she won her first international title at the Hungarian International Challenge 2022 with Brian Wassink.

== Achievements ==
=== European Junior Championships ===
Mixed doubles
Year	Venue	Partner	Opponent	Score	Result
2018	Kalev Sports Hall; Tallinn, Estonia	(Netherlands) Wessel van der Aar	(France) Fabien Delrue (France) Juliette Moinard	16–21, 16–21	Silver

=== BWF International Challenge/Series (6 titles, 4 runners-up) ===
Women's doubles
Year	Tournament	Partner	Opponent	Score	Result
2019	Dutch International	(Netherlands) Debora Jille	(Denmark) Amalie Magelund (Denmark) Freja Ravn	24–22, 19–21, 11–21	(silver) Runner-up
2019	Croatian International	(Netherlands) Debora Jille	(Ukraine) Hrystyna Dzhangobekova (Slovakia) Katarina Vargová	21–13, 21–9	(gold) Winner
2019	Lithuanian International	(Netherlands) Debora Jille	(Denmark) Christine Busch (Denmark) Amalie Schulz	21–18, 21–10	(gold) Winner
2021	Spanish International	(Netherlands) Imke van der Aar	(Spain) Paula López (Spain) Lorena Uslé	21–11, 21–19	(gold) Winner
2022	Malta International	(Netherlands) Kirsten de Wit	(Germany) Julia Meyer (Germany) Leona Michalski	21–16, 21–16	(gold) Winner
2023	Luxembourg Open	(Netherlands) Kirsten de Wit	(Denmark) Amalie Cecilie Kudsk (Denmark) Signe Schulz	21–14, 8–21, 21–19	(gold) Winner
2023	Welsh International	(Denmark) Natasja Anthonisen	(Bulgaria) Gabriela Stoeva (Bulgaria) Stefani Stoeva	22–24, 11–21	(silver) Runner-up

Mixed doubles
Year	Tournament	Partner	Opponent	Score	Result
2019	Polish International	(Netherlands) Ruben Jille	(Denmark) Mikkel Mikkelsen (Denmark) Amalie Magelund	19–21, 17–21	(silver) Runner-up
2022	Hungarian International	(Netherlands) Brian Wassink	(England) Steven Stallwood (England) Hope Warner	24–22, 16–21, 21–13	(gold) Winner
2022	Malta International	(Netherlands) Brian Wassink	(Germany) Malik Bourakkadi (Germany) Leona Michalski	14–21, 21–13, 16–21	(silver) Runner-up

BWF International Challenge tournament
BWF International Series tournament
BWF Future Series tournament

=== BWF Junior International (3 titles) ===
Girls' doubles
Year	Tournament	Partner	Opponent	Score	Result
2017	Czech Junior International	(Netherlands) Milou Lugters	(Ukraine) Anastasiya Prozorova (Ukraine) Valeriya Rudakova	18–21, 11–13 retired	(gold) Winner
2017	Estonian Junior International	(Netherlands) Milou Lugters	(Ukraine) Anastasiya Prozorova (Ukraine) Valeriya Rudakova	11–5, 11–7, 11–9	(gold) Winner
2018	Irish Junior Open	(Netherlands) Milou Lugters	(Scotland) Lauren Middleton (Scotland) Sarah Sidebottom	20–22, 21–14, 21–15	(gold) Winner

BWF Junior International Grand Prix tournament
BWF Junior International Challenge tournament
BWF Junior International Series tournament
BWF Junior Future Series tournament
