= Annabella Jäger =

German badminton player (born 1998)

Personal information
- Born: 16 July 1998 (age 28) Saxony, Germany

Sport
- Country: Germany
- Sport: Badminton
- Handedness: Right

Women's & mixed doubles
- Highest ranking: 68 (WD 10 September 2019); 168 (XD 10 December 2019)
- BWF profile
Medal record
Women's badminton
Representing Germany
European Women's Team Championships
Silver medal – second place	2020 Liévin	Women's team
European Mixed Team Championships
Bronze medal – third place	2021 Vantaa	Mixed team

Annabella Jäger (born 16 July 1998) is a German badminton player. Jäger who affiliate with TSV 1906 Freystadt won the 2016 Southeast German badminton championships in the women's singles event, also clinched three title in the junior by winning the girls' singles, girls' doubles and mixed doubles.

== Achievements ==
=== BWF International Challenge/Series (1 title, 2 runners-up) ===
Women's doubles
Year	Tournament	Partner	Opponent	Score	Result
2016	Hellas International	(Germany) Vanessa Seele	(Bulgaria) Mariya Mitsova (Bulgaria) Petya Nedelcheva	11–21, 9–21	(silver) Runner-up
2021	Italian International	(Germany) Leona Michalski	(Germany) Stine Küspert (Germany) Emma Moszczyński	9–21, 10–21	(silver) Runner-up
2022	Réunion Open	(Germany) Leona Michalski	(India) Rutaparna Panda (India) Swetaparna Panda	13–21, 21–18, 21–18	(gold) Winner

BWF International Challenge tournament
BWF International Series tournament
BWF Future Series tournament
