= Kalev Sports Hall =

Sports venue in Tallinn

- Korvpalli Häll (The Cradle of Basketball)
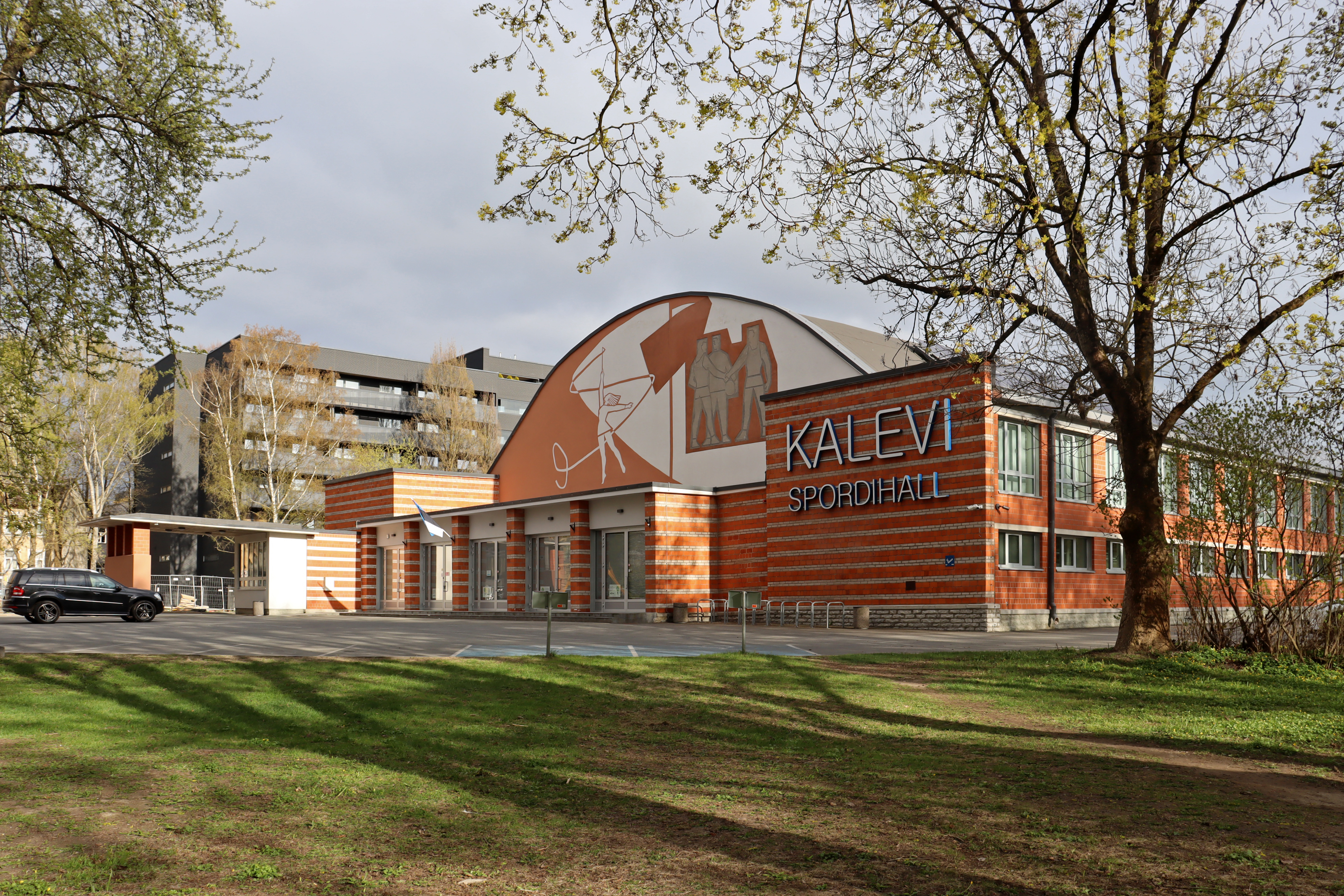
- Kalev Sports Hall in 2024
- Interactive map of Kalev Sports Hall
- Address: Juhkentali 12
- Location: Tallinn, Estonia
- Coordinates: 59°25′38″N 24°45′38″E
- Owner: City of Tallinn
- Operator: Tallinna Spordikeskus
- Capacity: 1,700
- Surface: Parquet
- Field size: 45,4m x 33,15m

Construction
- Opened: 24 November 1962
- Renovated: 2011, 2017
- Cost: 400,000 Rbls (equivalent to US$360,000 at the time)
- Architects: Peeter Tarvas & Uno Tölpus

Tenants
- KK Kalev (1962–2005); BC Kalev (2005–2015, 2017–present)

Kalev Sports Hall (Estonian: Kalevi spordihall) is a multi-purpose indoor arena in the Juhkentali subdistrict of Kesklinn in Tallinn, Estonia. It was opened in 1962 and is owned by the City of Tallinn. The hall can hold up to 1,700 people (all-seater). It generally hosts basketball games, but also trainings and minor-league competitions for volleyball, athletics, futsal, tennis and gymnastics.

== History ==
Kalev Sports Hall was built in 1962 and it was opened in 24 November 1962. It architects are Peeter Tarvas and Uno Tölpus. During the time when Kalev Sports Hall was the largest sports halls in Tallinn, there was organized many other events such as dance tournaments, entertainments and competitions. Still mostly it was used for hosting sporting events. It has remained in history as a basketball hall, several legendary games have been held there, where the best basketball players in the world of their time have played. One of the most legendary basketball games played there was in 26 August 1970 when the Estonian SSR team won USA team 88:82. In 1991, Kalev won the Soviet Union Championship defeating Leningrad Spartak in the final which was held in Kalev Sports Hall.

Because Estonian Sports Association Kalev was facing financial difficulties they put the Kalev Sports Hall for sale. In 2010 Tallinn City Council bought the Kalev Sports Hall from its previous owners Estonian Sports Association Kalev to cover their debts.

In 2016, there was a renovation and the whole hall was emptied of everything. The floor was carved 90 cm deeper to gain more space and increase seating capacity. The renovation cost was 7 to 7.5 million euros. In 2019, the International Olympic Committee awarded a “Sports and Sustainable Architecture” award for the building.

== See also ==
- List of indoor arenas in Estonia
