= 2020 Denmark Open =

Badminton championships

Tournament details
- Dates: 13–18 October
- Level: Super 750
- Total prize money: US$750,000
- Venue: Odense Sports Park
- Location: Odense, Denmark

Champions
- Men's singles: (Denmark) Anders Antonsen
- Women's singles: (Japan) Nozomi Okuhara
- Men's doubles: (England) Marcus Ellis (England) Chris Langridge
- Women's doubles: (Japan) Yuki Fukushima (Japan) Sayaka Hirota
- Mixed doubles: (Germany) Mark Lamsfuß (Germany) Isabel Herttrich

The 2020 Denmark Open (officially known as the Danisa Denmark Open presented by Victor for sponsorship reasons) was a badminton tournament which took place at the Odense Sports Park in Denmark from 13 to 18 October 2020. It had a total purse of $750,000. Many Players withdrew due to the COVID pandemic ,

== Tournament ==
The 2020 Denmark Open became the sixth tournament of the 2020 BWF World Tour following the postponement of 17 tournaments due to the ongoing coronavirus outbreak. It was a part of the Denmark Open championships, which had been held since 1935. This tournament was organized by Badminton Denmark and sanctioned by the BWF.

=== Venue ===
This international tournament was held at Odense Sports Park in Odense, Denmark.

=== Point distribution ===
Below is the point distribution for each phase of the tournament based on the BWF points system for the BWF World Tour Super 750 event.

Winner	Runner-up	3/4	5/8	9/16	17/32
11,000	9,350	7,700	6,050	4,320	2,660

=== Prize money ===
The total prize money for this tournament was US$750,000. Distribution of prize money was in accordance with BWF regulations.

Event	Winner	Finals	Semi-finals	Quarter-finals	Last 16	Last 32
Singles	$52,500	$25,500	$10,500	$4,125	$2,250	$750
Doubles	$55,500	$26,250	$10,500	$4,687.5	$2,437.5	$750

== Men's singles ==
=== Seeds ===
1. (Japan) Kento Momota (withdrew)
2. (Chinese Taipei) Chou Tien-chen (semifinals)
3. (Denmark) Anders Antonsen (champion)
4. (Japan) Kanta Tsuneyama (withdrew)
5. (India) Srikanth Kidambi (quarterfinals)
6. (Japan) Kenta Nishimoto (semifinals)
7. (Denmark) Rasmus Gemke (final)
8. (Denmark) Jan Ø. Jørgensen (quarterfinals)

=== Finals ===
Semi-finals
7	(Denmark) Rasmus Gemke	21	21
6	(Japan) Kenta Nishimoto	14	17
3	(Denmark) Anders Antonsen	21	21
2	(Chinese Taipei) Chou Tien-chen	17	15

Final
7	(Denmark) Rasmus Gemke	21	19	12
3	(Denmark) Anders Antonsen	18	21	21

=== Top half ===
==== Section 1 ====
First Round
PFR	(Hungary) G Krausz	11	6
(Canada) B Yang	21	21
PFR	(Germany) M Weißkirchen	21	22
PFR	(United States) T Lam	19	20
7	(Denmark) R Gemke	15	21	21
(Spain) L E Peñalver	21	17	16
(Netherlands) M Caljouw	21	12	21
(Finland) K Koljonen	9	21	14

Second Round
(Canada) B Yang	19	20
PFR	(Germany) M Weißkirchen	21	22
7	(Denmark) R Gemke	17	21	21
(Netherlands) M Caljouw	21	15	14

Quarter-finals
PFR	(Germany) M Weißkirchen	13	10
7	(Denmark) R Gemke	21	21

==== Section 2 ====
First Round
PFR	(Belgium) M Moreels	13	8
(Denmark) H-K Vittinghus	21	21
(India) L Sen	21	21
(France) C Popov	9	15
6	(Japan) K Nishimoto	21	21
(Israel) M Zilberman	9	10
(Germany) K Schäfer	17	20
(France) B Leverdez	21	22

Second Round
(Denmark) H-K Vittinghus	15	21	21
(India) L Sen	21	7	17
6	(Japan) K Nishimoto	21	21
(France) B Leverdez	19	9

Quarter-finals
(Denmark) H-K Vittinghus	12	12
6	(Japan) K Nishimoto	21	21

=== Bottom half ===
==== Section 3 ====
First Round
(France) T J Popov	21	21
(Canada) B. R. Sankeerth	5	17
(Sweden) F Burestedt	19	12
8	(Denmark) J Ø. Jørgensen	21	21
(France) T Rouxel	21	21
(France) L Claerbout	16	16
(India) A Jayaram	12	14
3	(Denmark) A Antonsen	21	21

Second Round
(France) T J Popov	16	21	14
8	(Denmark) J Ø. Jørgensen	21	10	21
(France) T Rouxel	9	12
3	(Denmark) A Antonsen	21	21

Quarter-finals
8	(Denmark) J Ø. Jørgensen	12	10
3	(Denmark) A Antonsen	21	21

==== Section 4 ====
First Round
(India) S Dey	13	8
(Canada) J Ho-shue	21	21
(England) T Penty	12	18
5	(India) S Kidambi	21	21
(Spain) P Abián	18	16
(Republic of Ireland) N Nguyen	21	21
(Denmark) V Svendsen	16	11
2	(Chinese Taipei) Chou T-c	21	21

Second Round
(Canada) J Ho-shue	15	14
5	(India) S Kidambi	21	21
(Republic of Ireland) N Nguyen	8	16
2	(Chinese Taipei) Chou T-c	21	21

Quarter-finals
5	(India) S Kidambi	22	13	16
2	(Chinese Taipei) Chou T-c	20	21	21

== Women's singles ==
=== Seeds ===
1. (Japan) Akane Yamaguchi (withdrew)
2. (Japan) Nozomi Okuhara (champion)
3. (Spain) Carolina Marín (final)
4. (Canada) Michelle Li (semifinals)
5. (Japan) Sayaka Takahashi (withdrew)
6. (United States) Beiwen Zhang (quarterfinals)
7. (Denmark) Mia Blichfeldt (quarterfinals)
8. (Japan) Aya Ohori (withdrew)

=== Finals ===
Semi-finals
(Germany) Yvonne Li	17	11
3	(Spain) Carolina Marín	21	21
4	(Canada) Michelle Li	10	7
2	(Japan) Nozomi Okuhara	21	21

Final
3	(Spain) Carolina Marín	19	17
2	(Japan) Nozomi Okuhara	21	21

=== Top half ===
==== Section 1 ====
First Round
1	(Japan) A Yamaguchi
(Estonia) K Kuuba	w	/	o
(Germany) Y Li	21	21
(Spain) C Azurmendi	13	16
PFR	(France) L Huet	21	25
(Czech Republic) K Tomalová	16	23
(Switzerland) S Jaquet	21	18	14
(Belgium) L Tan	19	21	21

Second Round
(Estonia) K Kuuba	16	21	14
(Germany) Y Li	21	13	21
PFR	(France) L Huet	15	25
(Belgium) L Tan	21	27

Quarter-finals
(Germany) Y Li	15	21	21
(Belgium) L Tan	21	12	17

==== Section 2 ====
First Round
3	(Spain) C Marín	21	21
(Russia) N Perminova	7	15
(Denmark) L Kjærsfeldt	18	18
(Denmark) L Christophersen	21	21
6	(United States) B Zhang	21	21
PFR	(Germany) A Spöri	9	11
(Russia) E Kosetskaya	22	21
(Denmark) I A Andersen	20	16

Second Round
3	(Spain) C Marín	21	21
(Denmark) L Christophersen	14	8
6	(United States) B Zhang	14	21	21
(Russia) E Kosetskaya	21	12	18

Quarter-finals
3	(Spain) C Marín	17	21	21
6	(United States) B Zhang	21	17	14

=== Bottom half ===
==== Section 3 ====
First Round
PFR	(Norway) E Hamang	14	7
(France) Y Hoyaux	21	21
(Slovakia) M Repiská	7	8
7	(Denmark) M Blichfeldt	21	21
(Germany) F Deprez	21	9	24
(France) Qi XF	15	21	22
(Denmark) A Schulz	18	13
4	(Canada) M Li	21	21

Second Round
(France) Y Hoyaux	8	19
7	(Denmark) M Blichfeldt	21	21
(Germany) F Deprez	8	10
4	(Canada) M Li	21	21

Quarter-finals
7	(Denmark) M Blichfeldt	17	7
4	(Canada) M Li	21	21

==== Section 4 ====
First Round
(United States) I Wang	21	17
(France) M Batomene	23	21
(Denmark) J D Jakobsen	21	21
PFR	(Ukraine) A Mikhalkova	8	12
(Germany) M Wilson	16	13
(Wales) J Hart	21	21
(Scotland) K Gilmour	7	19
2	(Japan) N Okuhara	21	21

Second Round
(France) M Batomene	18	17
(Denmark) J D Jakobsen	21	21
(Wales) J Hart	6	12
2	(Japan) N Okuhara	21	21

Quarter-finals
(Denmark) J D Jakobsen	6	12
2	(Japan) N Okuhara	21	21

== Men's doubles ==
=== Seeds ===
1. (Japan) Takeshi Kamura / Keigo Sonoda (withdrew)
2. (Japan) Hiroyuki Endo / Yuta Watanabe (withdrew)
3. (Japan) Takuro Hoki / Yugo Kobayashi (withdrew)
4. (Denmark) Kim Astrup / Anders Skaarup Rasmussen (second round)
5. (England) Marcus Ellis / Chris Langridge (champions)
6. (Germany) Mark Lamsfuß / Marvin Seidel (second round)
7. (Russia) Vladimir Ivanov / Ivan Sozonov (final)
8. (Japan) Akira Koga / Taichi Saito (withdrew)

=== Finals ===
Semi-finals
5	(England) Marcus Ellis (England) Chris Langridge	22	21
(Denmark) Joel Eipe (Denmark) Rasmus Kjær	20	16
(England) Ben Lane (England) Sean Vendy	15	21	14
7	(Russia) Vladimir Ivanov (Russia) Ivan Sozonov	21	18	21

Final
5	(England) Marcus Ellis (England) Chris Langridge	20	21	21
7	(Russia) Vladimir Ivanov (Russia) Ivan Sozonov	22	17	18

=== Top half ===
==== Section 1 ====
First Round
(France) C Popov (France) T J Popov	19	21	21
(Denmark) M T Munk (Denmark) O Sunekær	21	12	16
5	(England) M Ellis (England) C Langridge	21	21
(Denmark) D Lundgaard (Denmark) M Thyrri	19	15
(Denmark) E Lauritzen (Denmark) M Muurholm	21	17	20
(France) S Corvée (France) K Lovang	19	21	22

Second Round
1	(Japan) T Kamura (Japan) K Sonoda
(France) C Popov (France) T J Popov	w	/	o
5	(England) M Ellis (England) C Langridge	21	21
(France) S Corvée (France) K Lovang	11	9

Quarter-finals
(France) C Popov (France) T J Popov	19	17
5	(England) M Ellis (England) C Langridge	21	21

==== Section 2 ====
First Round
4	(Denmark) K Astrup (Denmark) A S Rasmussen	21	21
(Canada) J Ho-Shue (Canada) N Yakura	10	15
(Germany) D Hess (Germany) J Pistorius	19	21	14
(Denmark) J Eipe (Denmark) R Kjær	21	19	21
8	(Japan) A Koga (Japan) T Saito
(France) F Delrue (France) W Villeger	w	/	o
(England) Z Russ (England) S Stallwood	17	18
(England) M Clare (England) M Flynn	21	21

Second Round
4	(Denmark) K Astrup (Denmark) A S Rasmussen	18	21	16
(Denmark) J Eipe (Denmark) R Kjær	21	17	21
(France) F Delrue (France) W Villeger	21	16	21
(England) M Clare (England) M Flynn	15	21	19

Quarter-finals
(Denmark) J Eipe (Denmark) R Kjær	21	21
(France) F Delrue (France) W Villeger	18	18

=== Bottom half ===
==== Section 3 ====
First Round
(France) E Adam (France) J Maio	11	13
(England) B Lane (England) S Vendy	21	21
(Denmark) M Christiansen (Denmark) N Nøhr	21	13	14
6	(Germany) M Lamsfuß (Germany) M Seidel	12	21	21
(Scotland) A Dunn (Scotland) A Hall	21	21
(United States) P Chew (United States) R Chew	15	11
(Germany) J R Jansen (Germany) P Käsbauer	w	/	o
3	(Japan) T Hoki (Japan) Y Kobayashi

Second Round
(England) B Lane (England) S Vendy	24	22
6	(Germany) M Lamsfuß (Germany) M Seidel	22	20
(Scotland) A Dunn (Scotland) A Hall	21	18
(Germany) J R Jansen (Germany) P Käsbauer	23	21

Quarter-finals
(England) B Lane (England) S Vendy	21	21
(Germany) J R Jansen (Germany) P Käsbauer	18	13

==== Section 4 ====
First Round
(Norway) T Flaatten (Norway) V Rikheim	15	10
(Republic of Ireland) J Magee (Republic of Ireland) P Reynolds	21	21
(England) R Easton (England) E Van Leeuwen	14	10
7	(Russia) V Ivanov (Russia) I Sozonov	21	21
(Netherlands) R Jille (Netherlands) T van der Lecq	18	19
(Denmark) J Bay (Denmark) L Mølhede	21	21
(Germany) M Datko (Germany) P Scheiel	w	/	o
2	(Japan) H Endo (Japan) Y Watanabe

Second Round
(Republic of Ireland) J Magee (Republic of Ireland) P Reynolds	12	15
7	(Russia) V Ivanov (Russia) I Sozonov	21	21
(Denmark) J Bay (Denmark) L Mølhede	21	21
(Germany) M Datko (Germany) P Scheiel	10	10

Quarter-finals
7	(Russia) V Ivanov (Russia) I Sozonov	15	21	21
(Denmark) J Bay (Denmark) L Mølhede	21	13	19

== Women's doubles ==
=== Seeds ===
1. (Japan) Yuki Fukushima / Sayaka Hirota (champions)
2. (Japan) Mayu Matsumoto / Wakana Nagahara (final)
3. (Japan) Nami Matsuyama / Chiharu Shida (withdrew)
4. (Bulgaria) Gabriela Stoeva / Stefani Stoeva (semifinals)
5. (England) Chloe Birch / Lauren Smith (quarterfinals)
6. (Denmark) Maiken Fruergaard / Sara Thygesen (quarterfinals)
7. (Canada) Rachel Honderich / Kristen Tsai (withdrew)
8. (France) Émilie Lefel / Anne Tran (quarterfinals)

=== Finals ===
Semi-finals
1	(Japan) Yuki Fukushima (Japan) Sayaka Hirota	21	21
(Denmark) Christine Busch (Denmark) Amalie Schulz	18	6
4	(Bulgaria) Gabriela Stoeva (Bulgaria) Stefani Stoeva	17	8
2	(Japan) Mayu Matsumoto (Japan) Wakana Nagahara	21	21

Final
1	(Japan) Yuki Fukushima (Japan) Sayaka Hirota	21	16	21
2	(Japan) Mayu Matsumoto (Japan) Wakana Nagahara	10	21	18

=== Top half ===
==== Section 1 ====
First Round
(Netherlands) D Jille (Netherlands) A Tirtosentono	13	18
(Germany) L Efler (Germany) I Herttrich	21	21
(Denmark) A Magelund (Denmark) F Ravn	21	21
(Denmark) J Finne-Ipsen (Denmark) M Surrow	11	13

Second Round
1	(Japan) Y Fukushima (Japan) S Hirota	21	21
(Germany) L Efler (Germany) I Herttrich	12	13
5	(England) C Birch (England) L Smith	21	21
(Denmark) A Magelund (Denmark) F Ravn	13	18

Quarter-finals
1	(Japan) Y Fukushima (Japan) S Hirota	13	21	21
5	(England) C Birch (England) L Smith	21	16	19

==== Section 2 ====
First Round
(Denmark) C Busch (Denmark) A Schulz	21	23
(Germany) A Jäger (Germany) S Küspert	9	21
(England) J Moore (England) V Williams	12	19
(Scotland) J MacPherson (Scotland) C Torrance	21	21

Second Round
3	(Japan) N Matsuyama (Japan) C Shida
(Denmark) C Busch (Denmark) A Schulz	w	/	o
7	(Canada) R Honderich (Canada) K Tsai
(Scotland) J MacPherson (Scotland) C Torrance	w	/	o

Quarter-finals
(Denmark) C Busch (Denmark) A Schulz	22	21
(Scotland) J MacPherson (Scotland) C Torrance	20	9

=== Bottom half ===
==== Section 3 ====
First Round
(Estonia) K-K Marran (Estonia) H Rüütel	21	21
(France) V Hériau (France) M Lambert	14	15
(Denmark) A C Kudsk (Denmark) S Schulz	21	13	20
8	(France) É Lefel (France) A Tran	13	21	22
(Denmark) A Bøje (Denmark) M Poulsen	w	/	o
(Canada) C Choi (Canada) J Wu

Second Round
(Estonia) K-K Marran (Estonia) H Rüütel	15	7
8	(France) É Lefel (France) A Tran	21	21
(Denmark) A Bøje (Denmark) M Poulsen	7	9
4	(Bulgaria) G Stoeva (Bulgaria) S Stoeva	21	21

Quarter-finals
8	(France) É Lefel (France) A Tran	5	8
4	(Bulgaria) G Stoeva (Bulgaria) S Stoeva	21	21

==== Section 4 ====
First Round
(Germany) K Ostermeyer (Germany) F Volkmann	21	16	21
(Sweden) C Nistad (Sweden) M Sjöö	18	21	10
(Denmark) N P. Anthonisen (Denmark) C Graversen	21	21
(Russia) A Akchurina (Russia) O Morozova	19	17

Second Round
(Germany) K Ostermeyer (Germany) F Volkmann	10	17
6	(Denmark) M Fruergaard (Denmark) S Thygesen	21	21
(Denmark) N P. Anthonisen (Denmark) C Graversen	6	8
2	(Japan) M Matsumoto (Japan) W Nagahara	21	21

Quarter-finals
6	(Denmark) M Fruergaard (Denmark) S Thygesen	19	15
2	(Japan) M Matsumoto (Japan) W Nagahara	21	21

== Mixed doubles ==
=== Seeds ===
1. (Japan) Yuta Watanabe / Arisa Higashino (withdrew)
2. (England) Marcus Ellis / Lauren Smith (semifinals)
3. (England) Chris Adcock / Gabby Adcock (final)
4. (Germany) Mark Lamsfuß / Isabel Herttrich (champions)
5. (Russia) Rodion Alimov / Alina Davletova (first round)
6. (Japan) Takuro Hoki / Wakana Nagahara (withdrew)
7. (Denmark) Mathias Christiansen / Alexandra Bøje (quarterfinals)
8. (Canada) Joshua Hurlburt-Yu / Josephine Wu (withdrew)

=== Finals ===
Semi-finals
(France) Julien Maio (France) Léa Palermo	12	20
3	(England) Chris Adcock (England) Gabby Adcock	21	22
4	(Germany) Mark Lamsfuß (Germany) Isabel Herttrich	21	21
2	(England) Marcus Ellis (England) Lauren Smith	18	18

Final
3	(England) Chris Adcock (England) Gabby Adcock	21	11	14
4	(Germany) Mark Lamsfuß (Germany) Isabel Herttrich	18	21	21

=== Top half ===
==== Section 1 ====
First Round
1	(Japan) Y Watanabe (Japan) A Higashino
(Republic of Ireland) S Magee (Republic of Ireland) C Magee	w	/	o
(Denmark) E Lauritzen (Denmark) I Bergstein	15	22	15
(Netherlands) T van der Lecq (Netherlands) D Jille	21	20	21
PFR	(Denmark) K H Kræmer (Denmark) A C Kudsk	15	21	13
(France) W Villeger (France) S Bauer	21	19	21
(France) J Maio (France) L Palermo	14	21	21
(France) R Labar (France) A Tran	21	14	16

Second Round
(Republic of Ireland) S Magee (Republic of Ireland) C Magee	21	10	21
(Netherlands) T van der Lecq (Netherlands) D Jille	14	21	13
(France) W Villeger (France) S Bauer	18	16
(France) J Maio (France) L Palermo	21	21

Quarter-finals
(Republic of Ireland) S Magee (Republic of Ireland) C Magee	15	15
(France) J Maio (France) L Palermo	21	21

==== Section 2 ====
First Round
3	(England) C Adcock (England) G Adcock	21	21
(Germany) P Scheiel (Germany) F Volkmann	14	17
(Scotland) A Hall (Scotland) J MacPherson	w	/	o
(England) C Hemming (England) J Pugh
PFR	(Germany) M Datko (Germany) S Küspert	16	16
(France) E Adam (France) M Lambert	21	21
(Estonia) M Laanes (Estonia) H Rüütel	11	7
(England) G Mairs (England) V Williams	21	21

Second Round
3	(England) C Adcock (England) G Adcock	21	21
(Scotland) A Hall (Scotland) J MacPherson	17	15
(France) E Adam (France) M Lambert	24	18	19
(England) G Mairs (England) V Williams	22	21	21

Quarter-finals
3	(England) C Adcock (England) G Adcock	19	21	21
(England) G Mairs (England) V Williams	21	11	16

=== Bottom half ===
==== Section 3 ====
First Round
(Denmark) N Nøhr (Denmark) A Magelund	21	22
(France) F Delrue (France) V Hériau	13	20
(Scotland) C Grimley (Scotland) E O'Donnell	16	7
7	(Denmark) M Christiansen (Denmark) A Bøje	21	21
(Germany) B Geiss (Germany) L Efler	15	10
(Denmark) M Mikkelsen (Denmark) R Søby Hansen	21	21
(Japan) A Koga (Japan) N Matsuyama
4	(Germany) M Lamsfuß (Germany) I Herttrich	w	/	o

Second Round
(Denmark) N Nøhr (Denmark) A Magelund	24	13	20
7	(Denmark) M Christiansen (Denmark) A Bøje	22	21	22
(Denmark) M Mikkelsen (Denmark) R Søby Hansen	11	10
4	(Germany) M Lamsfuß (Germany) I Herttrich	21	21

Quarter-finals
7	(Denmark) M Christiansen (Denmark) A Bøje	16	21	14
4	(Germany) M Lamsfuß (Germany) I Herttrich	21	19	21

==== Section 4 ====
First Round
(Germany) J Pistorius (Germany) A Jäger	8	8
(Denmark) J Bay (Denmark) S Lundgaard	21	21
(Scotland) A Dunn (Scotland) C Torrance	11	21	21
5	(Russia) R Alimov (Russia) A Davletova	21	18	19
(Netherlands) R Jille (Netherlands) I van der Aar	21	21
(Denmark) M Thyrri (Denmark) M Surrow	17	13
(Germany) J R Jansen (Germany) K Ostermeyer	8	12
2	(England) M Ellis (England) L Smith	21	21

Second Round
(Denmark) J Bay (Denmark) S Lundgaard	21	21
(Scotland) A Dunn (Scotland) C Torrance	17	14
(Netherlands) R Jille (Netherlands) I van der Aar	17	21
2	(England) M Ellis (England) L Smith	21	23

Quarter-finals
(Denmark) J Bay (Denmark) S Lundgaard	21	12
2	(England) M Ellis (England) L Smith	23	21

Preceded by 2020 Dutch Open (original); 2020 All England Open (eventual)	BWF World Tour; 2020 BWF season	Succeeded by 2020 French Open (original); 2020 SaarLorLux Open (eventual)
