= 2020 BWF World Tour =

2020 badminton season

Tournament details
- Dates: 7 January 2020 – 31 January 2021
- Edition: 3rd

The 2020 BWF World Tour (officially known as 2020 HSBC BWF World Tour for sponsorship reasons) was the third season of the BWF World Tour of badminton, a circuit of 27 tournaments which led up to the World Tour Finals tournament. The 28 tournaments are divided into five levels: Level 1 was the said World Tour Finals, Level 2 called Super 1000 (five tournaments), Level 3 called Super 750 (five tournaments), Level 4 called Super 500 (six tournaments) and Level 5 called Super 300 (11 tournaments). Each of these tournaments offers different ranking points and prize money. The highest points and prize pool were offered at the Super 1000 level (including the World Tour Finals).

One other category of tournament, the BWF Tour Super 100 (level 6), also offers BWF World Tour ranking points. Although this level is not part of the BWF World Tour, it is an important part of the pathway and entry point for players into the BWF World Tour tournaments. When the 10 Level 6 grade tournaments of the BWF Tour Super 100 are included, the complete tour consists of 38 tournaments.

== Results ==
Below is the schedule released by the Badminton World Federation:

=== Key ===
World Tour Finals
Super 1000
Super 750
Super 500
Super 300
Super 100

=== Winners ===
Tour	Report	Men's singles	Women's singles	Men's doubles	Women's doubles	Mixed doubles
World Tour Finals
(Thailand) BWF World Tour Finals	Report	(Denmark) Anders Antonsen	(Chinese Taipei) Tai Tzu-ying	(Chinese Taipei) Lee Yang (Chinese Taipei) Wang Chi-lin	(South Korea) Lee So-hee (South Korea) Shin Seung-chan	(Thailand) Dechapol Puavaranukroh (Thailand) Sapsiree Taerattanachai
Super 1000
All England Open	Report	(Denmark) Viktor Axelsen	(Chinese Taipei) Tai Tzu-ying	(Japan) Hiroyuki Endo (Japan) Yuta Watanabe	(Japan) Yuki Fukushima (Japan) Sayaka Hirota	(Indonesia) Praveen Jordan (Indonesia) Melati Daeva Oktavianti
China Open	Report	Cancelled				
Indonesia Open	Report	Cancelled				
Yonex Thailand Open	Report	(Denmark) Viktor Axelsen	(Spain) Carolina Marín	(Chinese Taipei) Lee Yang (Chinese Taipei) Wang Chi-lin	(Indonesia) Greysia Polii (Indonesia) Apriyani Rahayu	(Thailand) Dechapol Puavaranukroh (Thailand) Sapsiree Taerattanachai
Toyota Thailand Open	Report	(Denmark) Viktor Axelsen	(Spain) Carolina Marín	(Chinese Taipei) Lee Yang (Chinese Taipei) Wang Chi-lin	(South Korea) Kim So-yeong (South Korea) Kong Hee-yong	(Thailand) Dechapol Puavaranukroh (Thailand) Sapsiree Taerattanachai
Super 750
Japan Open	Report	Cancelled				
Denmark Open	Report	(Denmark) Anders Antonsen	(Japan) Nozomi Okuhara	(England) Marcus Ellis (England) Chris Langridge	(Japan) Yuki Fukushima (Japan) Sayaka Hirota	(Germany) Mark Lamsfuß (Germany) Isabel Herttrich
(France) French Open	Report	Cancelled				
Fuzhou China Open	Report	Cancelled				
Malaysia Open	Report	Cancelled				
Super 500
Malaysia Masters	Report	(Japan) Kento Momota	(China) Chen Yufei	(South Korea) Kim Gi-jung (South Korea) Lee Yong-dae	(China) Li Wenmei (China) Zheng Yu	(China) Zheng Siwei (China) Huang Yaqiong
Indonesia Masters	Report	(Indonesia) Anthony Sinisuka Ginting	(Thailand) Ratchanok Intanon	(Indonesia) Marcus Fernaldi Gideon (Indonesia) Kevin Sanjaya Sukamuljo	(Indonesia) Greysia Polii (Indonesia) Apriyani Rahayu	(China) Zheng Siwei (China) Huang Yaqiong
Singapore Open	Report	Cancelled				
(South Korea) Korea Open	Report	Cancelled				
Hong Kong Open	Report	Cancelled				
India Open	Report	Cancelled				
Super 300
Thailand Masters	Report	(Hong Kong) Ng Ka Long	(Japan) Akane Yamaguchi	(Malaysia) Ong Yew Sin (Malaysia) Teo Ee Yi	(China) Chen Qingchen (China) Jia Yifan	(England) Marcus Ellis (England) Lauren Smith
Spain Masters	Report	(Denmark) Viktor Axelsen	(Thailand) Pornpawee Chochuwong	(Denmark) Kim Astrup (Denmark) Anders Skaarup Rasmussen	(Indonesia) Greysia Polii (Indonesia) Apriyani Rahayu	(South Korea) Kim Sa-rang (South Korea) Kim Ha-na
(Germany) German Open	Report	Cancelled				
(Switzerland) Swiss Open	Report	Cancelled				
(Australia) Australian Open	Report	Cancelled				
(United States) U.S. Open	Report	Cancelled				
(Chinese Taipei) Taipei Open	Report	Cancelled				
New Zealand Open	Report	Cancelled				
Macau Open	Report	Cancelled				
(India) Syed Modi International	Report	Cancelled				
(South Korea) Korea Masters	Report	Cancelled				
Super 100
(France) Orléans Masters	Report	Cancelled				
(Canada) Canadian Open	Report	Cancelled				
(Russia) Russian Open	Report	Cancelled				
(India) Hyderabad Open	Report	Cancelled				
(Japan) Akita Masters	Report	Cancelled				
Lingshui China Masters	Report	Cancelled				
Vietnam Open	Report	Cancelled				
Indonesia Masters Super 100	Report	Cancelled				
(Netherlands) Dutch Open	Report	Cancelled				
(Germany) SaarLorLux Open	Report	(France) Toma Junior Popov	(Scotland) Kirsty Gilmour	(Denmark) Jeppe Bay (Denmark) Lasse Mølhede	(Bulgaria) Gabriela Stoeva (Bulgaria) Stefani Stoeva	(Denmark) Mathias Christiansen (Denmark) Alexandra Bøje

== Finals ==
This is the complete schedule of events on the 2020 calendar, with the champions and runners-up documented.

=== January ===
Date	Tournament	Champions	Runners-up
7–12 January	Malaysia Masters (Draw): Host: Kuala Lumpur, Malaysia; Venue: Axiata Arena; Level: Super 500; Prize: $400,000; Format: 32MS/32WS/32MD/32WD/32XD	(Japan) Kento Momota	(Denmark) Viktor Axelsen
7–12 January	Malaysia Masters (Draw): Host: Kuala Lumpur, Malaysia; Venue: Axiata Arena; Level: Super 500; Prize: $400,000; Format: 32MS/32WS/32MD/32WD/32XD	Score: 24–22, 21–11	
7–12 January	Malaysia Masters (Draw): Host: Kuala Lumpur, Malaysia; Venue: Axiata Arena; Level: Super 500; Prize: $400,000; Format: 32MS/32WS/32MD/32WD/32XD	(China) Chen Yufei	(Chinese Taipei) Tai Tzu-ying
7–12 January	Malaysia Masters (Draw): Host: Kuala Lumpur, Malaysia; Venue: Axiata Arena; Level: Super 500; Prize: $400,000; Format: 32MS/32WS/32MD/32WD/32XD	Score: 21–17, 21–10	
7–12 January	Malaysia Masters (Draw): Host: Kuala Lumpur, Malaysia; Venue: Axiata Arena; Level: Super 500; Prize: $400,000; Format: 32MS/32WS/32MD/32WD/32XD	(South Korea) Kim Gi-jung (South Korea) Lee Yong-dae	(China) Li Junhui (China) Liu Yuchen
7–12 January	Malaysia Masters (Draw): Host: Kuala Lumpur, Malaysia; Venue: Axiata Arena; Level: Super 500; Prize: $400,000; Format: 32MS/32WS/32MD/32WD/32XD	Score: 21–14, 21–16	
7–12 January	Malaysia Masters (Draw): Host: Kuala Lumpur, Malaysia; Venue: Axiata Arena; Level: Super 500; Prize: $400,000; Format: 32MS/32WS/32MD/32WD/32XD	(China) Li Wenmei (China) Zheng Yu	(China) Du Yue (China) Li Yinhui
7–12 January	Malaysia Masters (Draw): Host: Kuala Lumpur, Malaysia; Venue: Axiata Arena; Level: Super 500; Prize: $400,000; Format: 32MS/32WS/32MD/32WD/32XD	Score: 21–19, 16–21, 21–19	
7–12 January	Malaysia Masters (Draw): Host: Kuala Lumpur, Malaysia; Venue: Axiata Arena; Level: Super 500; Prize: $400,000; Format: 32MS/32WS/32MD/32WD/32XD	(China) Zheng Siwei (China) Huang Yaqiong	(China) Wang Yilyu (China) Huang Dongping
7–12 January	Malaysia Masters (Draw): Host: Kuala Lumpur, Malaysia; Venue: Axiata Arena; Level: Super 500; Prize: $400,000; Format: 32MS/32WS/32MD/32WD/32XD	Score: 21–19, 21–12	
14–19 January	Indonesia Masters (Draw): Host: Jakarta, Indonesia; Venue: Istora Gelora Bung Karno; Level: Super 500; Prize: $400,000; Format: 32MS/32WS/32MD/32WD/32XD	(Indonesia) Anthony Sinisuka Ginting	(Denmark) Anders Antonsen
14–19 January	Indonesia Masters (Draw): Host: Jakarta, Indonesia; Venue: Istora Gelora Bung Karno; Level: Super 500; Prize: $400,000; Format: 32MS/32WS/32MD/32WD/32XD	Score: 17–21, 21–15, 21–9	
14–19 January	Indonesia Masters (Draw): Host: Jakarta, Indonesia; Venue: Istora Gelora Bung Karno; Level: Super 500; Prize: $400,000; Format: 32MS/32WS/32MD/32WD/32XD	(Thailand) Ratchanok Intanon	(Spain) Carolina Marín
14–19 January	Indonesia Masters (Draw): Host: Jakarta, Indonesia; Venue: Istora Gelora Bung Karno; Level: Super 500; Prize: $400,000; Format: 32MS/32WS/32MD/32WD/32XD	Score: 21–19, 11–21, 21–18	
14–19 January	Indonesia Masters (Draw): Host: Jakarta, Indonesia; Venue: Istora Gelora Bung Karno; Level: Super 500; Prize: $400,000; Format: 32MS/32WS/32MD/32WD/32XD	(Indonesia) Marcus Fernaldi Gideon (Indonesia) Kevin Sanjaya Sukamuljo	(Indonesia) Mohammad Ahsan (Indonesia) Hendra Setiawan
14–19 January	Indonesia Masters (Draw): Host: Jakarta, Indonesia; Venue: Istora Gelora Bung Karno; Level: Super 500; Prize: $400,000; Format: 32MS/32WS/32MD/32WD/32XD	Score: 21–15, 21–16	
14–19 January	Indonesia Masters (Draw): Host: Jakarta, Indonesia; Venue: Istora Gelora Bung Karno; Level: Super 500; Prize: $400,000; Format: 32MS/32WS/32MD/32WD/32XD	(Indonesia) Greysia Polii (Indonesia) Apriyani Rahayu	(Denmark) Maiken Fruergaard (Denmark) Sara Thygesen
14–19 January	Indonesia Masters (Draw): Host: Jakarta, Indonesia; Venue: Istora Gelora Bung Karno; Level: Super 500; Prize: $400,000; Format: 32MS/32WS/32MD/32WD/32XD	Score: 18–21, 21–11, 23–21	
14–19 January	Indonesia Masters (Draw): Host: Jakarta, Indonesia; Venue: Istora Gelora Bung Karno; Level: Super 500; Prize: $400,000; Format: 32MS/32WS/32MD/32WD/32XD	(China) Zheng Siwei (China) Huang Yaqiong	(China) Wang Yilyu (China) Huang Dongping
14–19 January	Indonesia Masters (Draw): Host: Jakarta, Indonesia; Venue: Istora Gelora Bung Karno; Level: Super 500; Prize: $400,000; Format: 32MS/32WS/32MD/32WD/32XD	Score: 21–9, 21–9	
21–26 January	Thailand Masters (Draw): Host: Bangkok, Thailand; Venue: Indoor Stadium Huamark; Level: Super 300; Prize: $170,000; Format: 32MS/32WS/32MD/32WD/32XD	(Hong Kong) Ng Ka Long	(Japan) Kenta Nishimoto
21–26 January	Thailand Masters (Draw): Host: Bangkok, Thailand; Venue: Indoor Stadium Huamark; Level: Super 300; Prize: $170,000; Format: 32MS/32WS/32MD/32WD/32XD	Score: 16–21, 21–13, 21–12	
21–26 January	Thailand Masters (Draw): Host: Bangkok, Thailand; Venue: Indoor Stadium Huamark; Level: Super 300; Prize: $170,000; Format: 32MS/32WS/32MD/32WD/32XD	(Japan) Akane Yamaguchi	(South Korea) An Se-young
21–26 January	Thailand Masters (Draw): Host: Bangkok, Thailand; Venue: Indoor Stadium Huamark; Level: Super 300; Prize: $170,000; Format: 32MS/32WS/32MD/32WD/32XD	Score: 21–16, 22–20	
21–26 January	Thailand Masters (Draw): Host: Bangkok, Thailand; Venue: Indoor Stadium Huamark; Level: Super 300; Prize: $170,000; Format: 32MS/32WS/32MD/32WD/32XD	(Malaysia) Ong Yew Sin (Malaysia) Teo Ee Yi	(China) Huang Kaixiang (China) Liu Cheng
21–26 January	Thailand Masters (Draw): Host: Bangkok, Thailand; Venue: Indoor Stadium Huamark; Level: Super 300; Prize: $170,000; Format: 32MS/32WS/32MD/32WD/32XD	Score: 18–21, 21–17, 21–17	
21–26 January	Thailand Masters (Draw): Host: Bangkok, Thailand; Venue: Indoor Stadium Huamark; Level: Super 300; Prize: $170,000; Format: 32MS/32WS/32MD/32WD/32XD	(China) Chen Qingchen (China) Jia Yifan	(South Korea) Baek Ha-na (South Korea) Jung Kyung-eun
21–26 January	Thailand Masters (Draw): Host: Bangkok, Thailand; Venue: Indoor Stadium Huamark; Level: Super 300; Prize: $170,000; Format: 32MS/32WS/32MD/32WD/32XD	Score: 17–21, 21–17, 21–15	
21–26 January	Thailand Masters (Draw): Host: Bangkok, Thailand; Venue: Indoor Stadium Huamark; Level: Super 300; Prize: $170,000; Format: 32MS/32WS/32MD/32WD/32XD	(England) Marcus Ellis (England) Lauren Smith	(Indonesia) Hafiz Faizal (Indonesia) Gloria Emanuelle Widjaja
21–26 January	Thailand Masters (Draw): Host: Bangkok, Thailand; Venue: Indoor Stadium Huamark; Level: Super 300; Prize: $170,000; Format: 32MS/32WS/32MD/32WD/32XD	Score: 21–16, 13–21, 21–16	

=== February ===
Date	Tournament	Champions	Runners-up
18–23 February	Spain Masters (Draw): Host: Barcelona, Spain; Venue: Pavelló de la Vall d'Hebron; Level: Super 300; Prize: $170,000; Format: 32MS/32WS/32MD/32WD/32XD	(Denmark) Viktor Axelsen	(Thailand) Kunlavut Vitidsarn
18–23 February	Spain Masters (Draw): Host: Barcelona, Spain; Venue: Pavelló de la Vall d'Hebron; Level: Super 300; Prize: $170,000; Format: 32MS/32WS/32MD/32WD/32XD	Score: 21–16, 21–13	
18–23 February	Spain Masters (Draw): Host: Barcelona, Spain; Venue: Pavelló de la Vall d'Hebron; Level: Super 300; Prize: $170,000; Format: 32MS/32WS/32MD/32WD/32XD	(Thailand) Pornpawee Chochuwong	(Spain) Carolina Marín
18–23 February	Spain Masters (Draw): Host: Barcelona, Spain; Venue: Pavelló de la Vall d'Hebron; Level: Super 300; Prize: $170,000; Format: 32MS/32WS/32MD/32WD/32XD	Score: 11–21, 21–16, 21–18	
18–23 February	Spain Masters (Draw): Host: Barcelona, Spain; Venue: Pavelló de la Vall d'Hebron; Level: Super 300; Prize: $170,000; Format: 32MS/32WS/32MD/32WD/32XD	(Denmark) Kim Astrup (Denmark) Anders Skaarup Rasmussen	(Chinese Taipei) Lee Yang (Chinese Taipei) Wang Chi-lin
18–23 February	Spain Masters (Draw): Host: Barcelona, Spain; Venue: Pavelló de la Vall d'Hebron; Level: Super 300; Prize: $170,000; Format: 32MS/32WS/32MD/32WD/32XD	Score: 21–17, 21–19	
18–23 February	Spain Masters (Draw): Host: Barcelona, Spain; Venue: Pavelló de la Vall d'Hebron; Level: Super 300; Prize: $170,000; Format: 32MS/32WS/32MD/32WD/32XD	(Indonesia) Greysia Polii (Indonesia) Apriyani Rahayu	(Bulgaria) Gabriela Stoeva (Bulgaria) Stefani Stoeva
18–23 February	Spain Masters (Draw): Host: Barcelona, Spain; Venue: Pavelló de la Vall d'Hebron; Level: Super 300; Prize: $170,000; Format: 32MS/32WS/32MD/32WD/32XD	Score: 18–21, 22–20, 21–17	
18–23 February	Spain Masters (Draw): Host: Barcelona, Spain; Venue: Pavelló de la Vall d'Hebron; Level: Super 300; Prize: $170,000; Format: 32MS/32WS/32MD/32WD/32XD	(South Korea) Kim Sa-rang (South Korea) Kim Ha-na	(France) Thom Gicquel (France) Delphine Delrue
18–23 February	Spain Masters (Draw): Host: Barcelona, Spain; Venue: Pavelló de la Vall d'Hebron; Level: Super 300; Prize: $170,000; Format: 32MS/32WS/32MD/32WD/32XD	Score: 15–21, 21–11, 21–10	

=== March ===
Date	Tournament	Champions	Runners-up
3–8 March (cancelled) (Note: This tournament, originally to be played on said dates, was later cancelled due to the COVID-19 pandemic in Germany.)	(Germany) German Open (Draw): Host: Mülheim, Germany; Venue: Innogy Sporthalle; Level: Super 300; Prize: $170,000; Format: 32MS/32WS/32MD/32WD/32XD		
3–8 March (cancelled)	(Germany) German Open (Draw): Host: Mülheim, Germany; Venue: Innogy Sporthalle; Level: Super 300; Prize: $170,000; Format: 32MS/32WS/32MD/32WD/32XD	Score:	
3–8 March (cancelled)	(Germany) German Open (Draw): Host: Mülheim, Germany; Venue: Innogy Sporthalle; Level: Super 300; Prize: $170,000; Format: 32MS/32WS/32MD/32WD/32XD	Score:	
3–8 March (cancelled)	(Germany) German Open (Draw): Host: Mülheim, Germany; Venue: Innogy Sporthalle; Level: Super 300; Prize: $170,000; Format: 32MS/32WS/32MD/32WD/32XD	Score:	
3–8 March (cancelled)	(Germany) German Open (Draw): Host: Mülheim, Germany; Venue: Innogy Sporthalle; Level: Super 300; Prize: $170,000; Format: 32MS/32WS/32MD/32WD/32XD	Score:	
3–8 March (cancelled)	(Germany) German Open (Draw): Host: Mülheim, Germany; Venue: Innogy Sporthalle; Level: Super 300; Prize: $170,000; Format: 32MS/32WS/32MD/32WD/32XD	Score:	
11–15 March	All England Open (Draw): Host: Birmingham, England; Venue: Arena Birmingham; Level: Super 1000; Prize: $1,100,000; Format: 32MS/32WS/32MD/32WD/32XD	(Denmark) Viktor Axelsen	(Chinese Taipei) Chou Tien-chen
11–15 March	All England Open (Draw): Host: Birmingham, England; Venue: Arena Birmingham; Level: Super 1000; Prize: $1,100,000; Format: 32MS/32WS/32MD/32WD/32XD	Score: 21–13, 21–14	
11–15 March	All England Open (Draw): Host: Birmingham, England; Venue: Arena Birmingham; Level: Super 1000; Prize: $1,100,000; Format: 32MS/32WS/32MD/32WD/32XD	(Chinese Taipei) Tai Tzu-ying	(China) Chen Yufei
11–15 March	All England Open (Draw): Host: Birmingham, England; Venue: Arena Birmingham; Level: Super 1000; Prize: $1,100,000; Format: 32MS/32WS/32MD/32WD/32XD	Score: 21–19, 21–15	
11–15 March	All England Open (Draw): Host: Birmingham, England; Venue: Arena Birmingham; Level: Super 1000; Prize: $1,100,000; Format: 32MS/32WS/32MD/32WD/32XD	(Japan) Hiroyuki Endo (Japan) Yuta Watanabe	(Indonesia) Marcus Fernaldi Gideon (Indonesia) Kevin Sanjaya Sukamuljo
11–15 March	All England Open (Draw): Host: Birmingham, England; Venue: Arena Birmingham; Level: Super 1000; Prize: $1,100,000; Format: 32MS/32WS/32MD/32WD/32XD	Score: 21–18, 12–21, 21–19	
11–15 March	All England Open (Draw): Host: Birmingham, England; Venue: Arena Birmingham; Level: Super 1000; Prize: $1,100,000; Format: 32MS/32WS/32MD/32WD/32XD	(Japan) Yuki Fukushima (Japan) Sayaka Hirota	(China) Du Yue (China) Li Yinhui
11–15 March	All England Open (Draw): Host: Birmingham, England; Venue: Arena Birmingham; Level: Super 1000; Prize: $1,100,000; Format: 32MS/32WS/32MD/32WD/32XD	Score: 21–13, 21–15	
11–15 March	All England Open (Draw): Host: Birmingham, England; Venue: Arena Birmingham; Level: Super 1000; Prize: $1,100,000; Format: 32MS/32WS/32MD/32WD/32XD	(Indonesia) Praveen Jordan (Indonesia) Melati Daeva Oktavianti	(Thailand) Dechapol Puavaranukroh (Thailand) Sapsiree Taerattanachai
11–15 March	All England Open (Draw): Host: Birmingham, England; Venue: Arena Birmingham; Level: Super 1000; Prize: $1,100,000; Format: 32MS/32WS/32MD/32WD/32XD	Score: 21–15, 17–21, 21–8	
17–22 March (cancelled) (Note: This tournament, originally to be played on said dates, was later cancelled due to the COVID-19 pandemic in Switzerland.)	(Switzerland) Swiss Open (Draw): Host: Basel, Switzerland; Venue: St. Jakobshalle; Level: Super 300; Prize: $175,000; Format: 32MS/32WS/32MD/32WD/32XD		
17–22 March (cancelled)	(Switzerland) Swiss Open (Draw): Host: Basel, Switzerland; Venue: St. Jakobshalle; Level: Super 300; Prize: $175,000; Format: 32MS/32WS/32MD/32WD/32XD	Score:	
17–22 March (cancelled)	(Switzerland) Swiss Open (Draw): Host: Basel, Switzerland; Venue: St. Jakobshalle; Level: Super 300; Prize: $175,000; Format: 32MS/32WS/32MD/32WD/32XD	Score:	
17–22 March (cancelled)	(Switzerland) Swiss Open (Draw): Host: Basel, Switzerland; Venue: St. Jakobshalle; Level: Super 300; Prize: $175,000; Format: 32MS/32WS/32MD/32WD/32XD	Score:	
17–22 March (cancelled)	(Switzerland) Swiss Open (Draw): Host: Basel, Switzerland; Venue: St. Jakobshalle; Level: Super 300; Prize: $175,000; Format: 32MS/32WS/32MD/32WD/32XD	Score:	
17–22 March (cancelled)	(Switzerland) Swiss Open (Draw): Host: Basel, Switzerland; Venue: St. Jakobshalle; Level: Super 300; Prize: $175,000; Format: 32MS/32WS/32MD/32WD/32XD	Score:	
24–29 March (cancelled) (Note: This tournament, originally to be played on said dates, was later cancelled due to the COVID-19 pandemic in France.)	(France) Orléans Masters (Draw): Host: Orléans, France; Venue: Palais des Sports; Level: Super 100; Prize: $90,000; Format: 48MS/32WS/32MD/32WD/32XD		
24–29 March (cancelled)	(France) Orléans Masters (Draw): Host: Orléans, France; Venue: Palais des Sports; Level: Super 100; Prize: $90,000; Format: 48MS/32WS/32MD/32WD/32XD	Score:	
24–29 March (cancelled)	(France) Orléans Masters (Draw): Host: Orléans, France; Venue: Palais des Sports; Level: Super 100; Prize: $90,000; Format: 48MS/32WS/32MD/32WD/32XD	Score:	
24–29 March (cancelled)	(France) Orléans Masters (Draw): Host: Orléans, France; Venue: Palais des Sports; Level: Super 100; Prize: $90,000; Format: 48MS/32WS/32MD/32WD/32XD	Score:	
24–29 March (cancelled)	(France) Orléans Masters (Draw): Host: Orléans, France; Venue: Palais des Sports; Level: Super 100; Prize: $90,000; Format: 48MS/32WS/32MD/32WD/32XD	Score:	
24–29 March (cancelled)	(France) Orléans Masters (Draw): Host: Orléans, France; Venue: Palais des Sports; Level: Super 100; Prize: $90,000; Format: 48MS/32WS/32MD/32WD/32XD	Score:	

=== April ===
Date	Tournament	Champions	Runners-up
7–12 April (canceled) (Note: BWF confirmed the cancelation of several tournaments due to the COVID-19 pandemic.)	Singapore Open (Draw): Host: Singapore; Venue: Singapore Indoor Stadium; Level: Super 500; Prize: $408,000; Format: 32MS/32WS/32MD/32WD/32XD		
7–12 April (canceled)	Singapore Open (Draw): Host: Singapore; Venue: Singapore Indoor Stadium; Level: Super 500; Prize: $408,000; Format: 32MS/32WS/32MD/32WD/32XD	Score:	
7–12 April (canceled)	Singapore Open (Draw): Host: Singapore; Venue: Singapore Indoor Stadium; Level: Super 500; Prize: $408,000; Format: 32MS/32WS/32MD/32WD/32XD	Score:	
7–12 April (canceled)	Singapore Open (Draw): Host: Singapore; Venue: Singapore Indoor Stadium; Level: Super 500; Prize: $408,000; Format: 32MS/32WS/32MD/32WD/32XD	Score:	
7–12 April (canceled)	Singapore Open (Draw): Host: Singapore; Venue: Singapore Indoor Stadium; Level: Super 500; Prize: $408,000; Format: 32MS/32WS/32MD/32WD/32XD	Score:	
7–12 April (canceled)	Singapore Open (Draw): Host: Singapore; Venue: Singapore Indoor Stadium; Level: Super 500; Prize: $408,000; Format: 32MS/32WS/32MD/32WD/32XD	Score:	

=== May ===
No World Tour tournaments was held in May.

=== June ===
Date	Tournament	Champions	Runners-up
2–7 June (cancelled) (Note: Update on Tournaments Grade 2, 3 and Junior cancelled due to the COVID-19 pandemic.)	(Australia) Australian Open (Draw): Host: Sydney, Australia; Venue: TBD; Level: Super 300; Prize: $170,000; Format: 32MS/32WS/32MD/32WD/32XD		
2–7 June (cancelled)	(Australia) Australian Open (Draw): Host: Sydney, Australia; Venue: TBD; Level: Super 300; Prize: $170,000; Format: 32MS/32WS/32MD/32WD/32XD	Score:	
2–7 June (cancelled)	(Australia) Australian Open (Draw): Host: Sydney, Australia; Venue: TBD; Level: Super 300; Prize: $170,000; Format: 32MS/32WS/32MD/32WD/32XD	Score:	
2–7 June (cancelled)	(Australia) Australian Open (Draw): Host: Sydney, Australia; Venue: TBD; Level: Super 300; Prize: $170,000; Format: 32MS/32WS/32MD/32WD/32XD	Score:	
2–7 June (cancelled)	(Australia) Australian Open (Draw): Host: Sydney, Australia; Venue: TBD; Level: Super 300; Prize: $170,000; Format: 32MS/32WS/32MD/32WD/32XD	Score:	
2–7 June (cancelled)	(Australia) Australian Open (Draw): Host: Sydney, Australia; Venue: TBD; Level: Super 300; Prize: $170,000; Format: 32MS/32WS/32MD/32WD/32XD	Score:	
23–28 June (canceled) (Note: BWF confirmed the cancelation of several tournaments due to the COVID-19 pandemic.)	(United States) U.S. Open (Draw): Host: Fullerton, California, United States; Venue: TBD; Level: Super 300; Prize: $170,000; Format: 32MS/32WS/32MD/32WD/32XD		
23–28 June (canceled)	(United States) U.S. Open (Draw): Host: Fullerton, California, United States; Venue: TBD; Level: Super 300; Prize: $170,000; Format: 32MS/32WS/32MD/32WD/32XD	Score:	
23–28 June (canceled)	(United States) U.S. Open (Draw): Host: Fullerton, California, United States; Venue: TBD; Level: Super 300; Prize: $170,000; Format: 32MS/32WS/32MD/32WD/32XD	Score:	
23–28 June (canceled)	(United States) U.S. Open (Draw): Host: Fullerton, California, United States; Venue: TBD; Level: Super 300; Prize: $170,000; Format: 32MS/32WS/32MD/32WD/32XD	Score:	
23–28 June (canceled)	(United States) U.S. Open (Draw): Host: Fullerton, California, United States; Venue: TBD; Level: Super 300; Prize: $170,000; Format: 32MS/32WS/32MD/32WD/32XD	Score:	
23–28 June (canceled)	(United States) U.S. Open (Draw): Host: Fullerton, California, United States; Venue: TBD; Level: Super 300; Prize: $170,000; Format: 32MS/32WS/32MD/32WD/32XD	Score:	
30 June – 5 July (canceled)	(Canada) Canadian Open (Draw): Host: Calgary, Canada; Venue: TBD; Level: Super 100; Prize: $90,000; Format: 48MS/32WS/32MD/32WD/32XD		
30 June – 5 July (canceled)	(Canada) Canadian Open (Draw): Host: Calgary, Canada; Venue: TBD; Level: Super 100; Prize: $90,000; Format: 48MS/32WS/32MD/32WD/32XD	Score:	
30 June – 5 July (canceled)	(Canada) Canadian Open (Draw): Host: Calgary, Canada; Venue: TBD; Level: Super 100; Prize: $90,000; Format: 48MS/32WS/32MD/32WD/32XD	Score:	
30 June – 5 July (canceled)	(Canada) Canadian Open (Draw): Host: Calgary, Canada; Venue: TBD; Level: Super 100; Prize: $90,000; Format: 48MS/32WS/32MD/32WD/32XD	Score:	
30 June – 5 July (canceled)	(Canada) Canadian Open (Draw): Host: Calgary, Canada; Venue: TBD; Level: Super 100; Prize: $90,000; Format: 48MS/32WS/32MD/32WD/32XD	Score:	
30 June – 5 July (canceled)	(Canada) Canadian Open (Draw): Host: Calgary, Canada; Venue: TBD; Level: Super 100; Prize: $90,000; Format: 48MS/32WS/32MD/32WD/32XD	Score:	

=== July ===
Date	Tournament	Champions	Runners-up
7–12 July (canceled) (Note: BWF confirmed the cancelation of several tournaments due to the COVID-19 pandemic.)	(Russia) Russian Open (Draw): Host: Vladivostok, Russia; Venue: TBD; Level: Super 100; Prize: $90,000; Format: 48MS/32WS/32MD/32WD/32XD		
7–12 July (canceled)	(Russia) Russian Open (Draw): Host: Vladivostok, Russia; Venue: TBD; Level: Super 100; Prize: $90,000; Format: 48MS/32WS/32MD/32WD/32XD	Score:	
7–12 July (canceled)	(Russia) Russian Open (Draw): Host: Vladivostok, Russia; Venue: TBD; Level: Super 100; Prize: $90,000; Format: 48MS/32WS/32MD/32WD/32XD	Score:	
7–12 July (canceled)	(Russia) Russian Open (Draw): Host: Vladivostok, Russia; Venue: TBD; Level: Super 100; Prize: $90,000; Format: 48MS/32WS/32MD/32WD/32XD	Score:	
7–12 July (canceled)	(Russia) Russian Open (Draw): Host: Vladivostok, Russia; Venue: TBD; Level: Super 100; Prize: $90,000; Format: 48MS/32WS/32MD/32WD/32XD	Score:	
7–12 July (canceled)	(Russia) Russian Open (Draw): Host: Vladivostok, Russia; Venue: TBD; Level: Super 100; Prize: $90,000; Format: 48MS/32WS/32MD/32WD/32XD	Score:	

=== August ===
Date	Tournament	Champions	Runners-up
11 – 16 August (canceled) (Note: Update on Tournaments Grade 2, 3 and Junior cancelled due to the COVID-19 pandemic.)	(India) Hyderabad Open (Draw): Host: Hyderabad, India; Venue: TBD; Level: Super 100; Prize: $90,000; Format: 48MS/32WS/32MD/32WD/32XD		
11 – 16 August (canceled)	(India) Hyderabad Open (Draw): Host: Hyderabad, India; Venue: TBD; Level: Super 100; Prize: $90,000; Format: 48MS/32WS/32MD/32WD/32XD	Score:	
11 – 16 August (canceled)	(India) Hyderabad Open (Draw): Host: Hyderabad, India; Venue: TBD; Level: Super 100; Prize: $90,000; Format: 48MS/32WS/32MD/32WD/32XD	Score:	
11 – 16 August (canceled)	(India) Hyderabad Open (Draw): Host: Hyderabad, India; Venue: TBD; Level: Super 100; Prize: $90,000; Format: 48MS/32WS/32MD/32WD/32XD	Score:	
11 – 16 August (canceled)	(India) Hyderabad Open (Draw): Host: Hyderabad, India; Venue: TBD; Level: Super 100; Prize: $90,000; Format: 48MS/32WS/32MD/32WD/32XD	Score:	
11 – 16 August (canceled)	(India) Hyderabad Open (Draw): Host: Hyderabad, India; Venue: TBD; Level: Super 100; Prize: $90,000; Format: 48MS/32WS/32MD/32WD/32XD	Score:	
18–23 August (canceled) (Note: BWF confirmed the cancellation of several tournaments due to the COVID-19 pandemic.)	(Japan) Akita Masters (Draw): Host: Akita, Akita Prefecture, Japan; Venue: TBD; Level: Super 100; Prize: $90,000; Format: 48MS/32WS/32MD/32WD/32XD		
18–23 August (canceled)	(Japan) Akita Masters (Draw): Host: Akita, Akita Prefecture, Japan; Venue: TBD; Level: Super 100; Prize: $90,000; Format: 48MS/32WS/32MD/32WD/32XD	Score:	
18–23 August (canceled)	(Japan) Akita Masters (Draw): Host: Akita, Akita Prefecture, Japan; Venue: TBD; Level: Super 100; Prize: $90,000; Format: 48MS/32WS/32MD/32WD/32XD	Score:	
18–23 August (canceled)	(Japan) Akita Masters (Draw): Host: Akita, Akita Prefecture, Japan; Venue: TBD; Level: Super 100; Prize: $90,000; Format: 48MS/32WS/32MD/32WD/32XD	Score:	
18–23 August (canceled)	(Japan) Akita Masters (Draw): Host: Akita, Akita Prefecture, Japan; Venue: TBD; Level: Super 100; Prize: $90,000; Format: 48MS/32WS/32MD/32WD/32XD	Score:	
18–23 August (canceled)	(Japan) Akita Masters (Draw): Host: Akita, Akita Prefecture, Japan; Venue: TBD; Level: Super 100; Prize: $90,000; Format: 48MS/32WS/32MD/32WD/32XD	Score:	
25–30 August (cancelled) (Note: This tournament, originally to be played from 25 February until 1 March before being moved to 5–10 May, was later cancelled due to the COVID-19 pandemic.)	Lingshui China Masters (Draw): Host: Lingshui, China; Venue: Agile Stadium of Lingshui Culture and Sports Square; Level: Super 100; Prize: $90,000; Format: 48MS/32WS/32MD/32WD/32XD		
25–30 August (cancelled)	Lingshui China Masters (Draw): Host: Lingshui, China; Venue: Agile Stadium of Lingshui Culture and Sports Square; Level: Super 100; Prize: $90,000; Format: 48MS/32WS/32MD/32WD/32XD	Score:	
25–30 August (cancelled)	Lingshui China Masters (Draw): Host: Lingshui, China; Venue: Agile Stadium of Lingshui Culture and Sports Square; Level: Super 100; Prize: $90,000; Format: 48MS/32WS/32MD/32WD/32XD	Score:	
25–30 August (cancelled)	Lingshui China Masters (Draw): Host: Lingshui, China; Venue: Agile Stadium of Lingshui Culture and Sports Square; Level: Super 100; Prize: $90,000; Format: 48MS/32WS/32MD/32WD/32XD	Score:	
25–30 August (cancelled)	Lingshui China Masters (Draw): Host: Lingshui, China; Venue: Agile Stadium of Lingshui Culture and Sports Square; Level: Super 100; Prize: $90,000; Format: 48MS/32WS/32MD/32WD/32XD	Score:	
25–30 August (cancelled)	Lingshui China Masters (Draw): Host: Lingshui, China; Venue: Agile Stadium of Lingshui Culture and Sports Square; Level: Super 100; Prize: $90,000; Format: 48MS/32WS/32MD/32WD/32XD	Score:	
25–30 August (cancelled)	Vietnam Open (Draw) (canceled): Host: Da Nang, Vietnam; Venue: TBD; Level: Super 100; Prize: $90,000; Format: 48MS/32WS/32MD/32WD/32XD		
25–30 August (cancelled)	Vietnam Open (Draw) (canceled): Host: Da Nang, Vietnam; Venue: TBD; Level: Super 100; Prize: $90,000; Format: 48MS/32WS/32MD/32WD/32XD	Score:	
25–30 August (cancelled)	Vietnam Open (Draw) (canceled): Host: Da Nang, Vietnam; Venue: TBD; Level: Super 100; Prize: $90,000; Format: 48MS/32WS/32MD/32WD/32XD	Score:	
25–30 August (cancelled)	Vietnam Open (Draw) (canceled): Host: Da Nang, Vietnam; Venue: TBD; Level: Super 100; Prize: $90,000; Format: 48MS/32WS/32MD/32WD/32XD	Score:	
25–30 August (cancelled)	Vietnam Open (Draw) (canceled): Host: Da Nang, Vietnam; Venue: TBD; Level: Super 100; Prize: $90,000; Format: 48MS/32WS/32MD/32WD/32XD	Score:	
25–30 August (cancelled)	Vietnam Open (Draw) (canceled): Host: Da Nang, Vietnam; Venue: TBD; Level: Super 100; Prize: $90,000; Format: 48MS/32WS/32MD/32WD/32XD	Score:	

=== September ===
Date	Tournament	Champions	Runners-up
1–6 September	(Chinese Taipei) Taipei Open (Draw) (cancelled) (Note: Tournament cancelled due to the COVID-19 pandemic on 29 July 2020.): Host: Taipei, Taiwan; Venue: TBD; Level: Super 300; Prize: $500,000; Format: 32MS/32WS/32MD/32WD/32XD		
1–6 September	(Chinese Taipei) Taipei Open (Draw) (cancelled): Host: Taipei, Taiwan; Venue: TBD; Level: Super 300; Prize: $500,000; Format: 32MS/32WS/32MD/32WD/32XD	Score:	
1–6 September	(Chinese Taipei) Taipei Open (Draw) (cancelled): Host: Taipei, Taiwan; Venue: TBD; Level: Super 300; Prize: $500,000; Format: 32MS/32WS/32MD/32WD/32XD	Score:	
1–6 September	(Chinese Taipei) Taipei Open (Draw) (cancelled): Host: Taipei, Taiwan; Venue: TBD; Level: Super 300; Prize: $500,000; Format: 32MS/32WS/32MD/32WD/32XD	Score:	
1–6 September	(Chinese Taipei) Taipei Open (Draw) (cancelled): Host: Taipei, Taiwan; Venue: TBD; Level: Super 300; Prize: $500,000; Format: 32MS/32WS/32MD/32WD/32XD	Score:	
1–6 September	(Chinese Taipei) Taipei Open (Draw) (cancelled): Host: Taipei, Taiwan; Venue: TBD; Level: Super 300; Prize: $500,000; Format: 32MS/32WS/32MD/32WD/32XD	Score:	
8–13 September	(South Korea) Korea Open (Draw) (cancelled): Host: Seoul, South Korea; Venue: TBD; Level: Super 500; Prize: $400,000; Format: 32MS/32WS/32MD/32WD/32XD		
8–13 September	(South Korea) Korea Open (Draw) (cancelled): Host: Seoul, South Korea; Venue: TBD; Level: Super 500; Prize: $400,000; Format: 32MS/32WS/32MD/32WD/32XD	Score:	
8–13 September	(South Korea) Korea Open (Draw) (cancelled): Host: Seoul, South Korea; Venue: TBD; Level: Super 500; Prize: $400,000; Format: 32MS/32WS/32MD/32WD/32XD	Score:	
8–13 September	(South Korea) Korea Open (Draw) (cancelled): Host: Seoul, South Korea; Venue: TBD; Level: Super 500; Prize: $400,000; Format: 32MS/32WS/32MD/32WD/32XD	Score:	
8–13 September	(South Korea) Korea Open (Draw) (cancelled): Host: Seoul, South Korea; Venue: TBD; Level: Super 500; Prize: $400,000; Format: 32MS/32WS/32MD/32WD/32XD	Score:	
8–13 September	(South Korea) Korea Open (Draw) (cancelled): Host: Seoul, South Korea; Venue: TBD; Level: Super 500; Prize: $400,000; Format: 32MS/32WS/32MD/32WD/32XD	Score:	
15–20 September	China Open (Draw) (cancelled): Host: Changzhou, China; Venue: TBD; Level: Super 1000; Prize: $1,100,000; Format: 32MS/32WS/32MD/32WD/32XD		
15–20 September	China Open (Draw) (cancelled): Host: Changzhou, China; Venue: TBD; Level: Super 1000; Prize: $1,100,000; Format: 32MS/32WS/32MD/32WD/32XD	Score:	
15–20 September	China Open (Draw) (cancelled): Host: Changzhou, China; Venue: TBD; Level: Super 1000; Prize: $1,100,000; Format: 32MS/32WS/32MD/32WD/32XD	Score:	
15–20 September	China Open (Draw) (cancelled): Host: Changzhou, China; Venue: TBD; Level: Super 1000; Prize: $1,100,000; Format: 32MS/32WS/32MD/32WD/32XD	Score:	
15–20 September	China Open (Draw) (cancelled): Host: Changzhou, China; Venue: TBD; Level: Super 1000; Prize: $1,100,000; Format: 32MS/32WS/32MD/32WD/32XD	Score:	
15–20 September	China Open (Draw) (cancelled): Host: Changzhou, China; Venue: TBD; Level: Super 1000; Prize: $1,100,000; Format: 32MS/32WS/32MD/32WD/32XD	Score:	
22–27 September	Japan Open (Draw) (cancelled): Host: Tokyo, Japan; Venue: TBD; Level: Super 750; Prize: $750,000; Format: 32MS/32WS/32MD/32WD/32XD		
22–27 September	Japan Open (Draw) (cancelled): Host: Tokyo, Japan; Venue: TBD; Level: Super 750; Prize: $750,000; Format: 32MS/32WS/32MD/32WD/32XD	Score:	
22–27 September	Japan Open (Draw) (cancelled): Host: Tokyo, Japan; Venue: TBD; Level: Super 750; Prize: $750,000; Format: 32MS/32WS/32MD/32WD/32XD	Score:	
22–27 September	Japan Open (Draw) (cancelled): Host: Tokyo, Japan; Venue: TBD; Level: Super 750; Prize: $750,000; Format: 32MS/32WS/32MD/32WD/32XD	Score:	
22–27 September	Japan Open (Draw) (cancelled): Host: Tokyo, Japan; Venue: TBD; Level: Super 750; Prize: $750,000; Format: 32MS/32WS/32MD/32WD/32XD	Score:	
22–27 September	Japan Open (Draw) (cancelled): Host: Tokyo, Japan; Venue: TBD; Level: Super 750; Prize: $750,000; Format: 32MS/32WS/32MD/32WD/32XD	Score:	
29 September – 4 October (canceled) (Note: BWF confirmed the cancelation of several tournaments due to the COVID-19 pandemic.)	Indonesia Masters Super 100 (Draw): Host: TBD, Indonesia; Venue: TBD; Level: Super 100; Prize: $90,000; Format: 48MS/32WS/32MD/32WD/32XD		
29 September – 4 October (canceled)	Indonesia Masters Super 100 (Draw): Host: TBD, Indonesia; Venue: TBD; Level: Super 100; Prize: $90,000; Format: 48MS/32WS/32MD/32WD/32XD	Score:	
29 September – 4 October (canceled)	Indonesia Masters Super 100 (Draw): Host: TBD, Indonesia; Venue: TBD; Level: Super 100; Prize: $90,000; Format: 48MS/32WS/32MD/32WD/32XD	Score:	
29 September – 4 October (canceled)	Indonesia Masters Super 100 (Draw): Host: TBD, Indonesia; Venue: TBD; Level: Super 100; Prize: $90,000; Format: 48MS/32WS/32MD/32WD/32XD	Score:	
29 September – 4 October (canceled)	Indonesia Masters Super 100 (Draw): Host: TBD, Indonesia; Venue: TBD; Level: Super 100; Prize: $90,000; Format: 48MS/32WS/32MD/32WD/32XD	Score:	
29 September – 4 October (canceled)	Indonesia Masters Super 100 (Draw): Host: TBD, Indonesia; Venue: TBD; Level: Super 100; Prize: $90,000; Format: 48MS/32WS/32MD/32WD/32XD	Score:	

=== October ===
Date	Tournament	Champions	Runners-up
6–11 October	(Netherlands) Dutch Open (Draw) (cancelled) (Note: Tournament cancelled due to the COVID-19 pandemic on 7 July 2020.): Host: Almere, Netherlands; Venue: TBD; Level: Super 100; Prize: $90,000; Format: 48MS/32WS/32MD/32WD/32XD		
6–11 October	(Netherlands) Dutch Open (Draw) (cancelled): Host: Almere, Netherlands; Venue: TBD; Level: Super 100; Prize: $90,000; Format: 48MS/32WS/32MD/32WD/32XD	Score:	
6–11 October	(Netherlands) Dutch Open (Draw) (cancelled): Host: Almere, Netherlands; Venue: TBD; Level: Super 100; Prize: $90,000; Format: 48MS/32WS/32MD/32WD/32XD	Score:	
6–11 October	(Netherlands) Dutch Open (Draw) (cancelled): Host: Almere, Netherlands; Venue: TBD; Level: Super 100; Prize: $90,000; Format: 48MS/32WS/32MD/32WD/32XD	Score:	
6–11 October	(Netherlands) Dutch Open (Draw) (cancelled): Host: Almere, Netherlands; Venue: TBD; Level: Super 100; Prize: $90,000; Format: 48MS/32WS/32MD/32WD/32XD	Score:	
6–11 October	(Netherlands) Dutch Open (Draw) (cancelled): Host: Almere, Netherlands; Venue: TBD; Level: Super 100; Prize: $90,000; Format: 48MS/32WS/32MD/32WD/32XD	Score:	
13–18 October	Denmark Open (Draw): Host: Odense, Denmark; Venue: Odense Sports Park; Level: Super 750; Prize: $750,000; Format: 32MS/32WS/32MD/32WD/32XD	(Denmark) Anders Antonsen	(Denmark) Rasmus Gemke
13–18 October	Denmark Open (Draw): Host: Odense, Denmark; Venue: Odense Sports Park; Level: Super 750; Prize: $750,000; Format: 32MS/32WS/32MD/32WD/32XD	Score: 18–21, 21–19, 21–12	
13–18 October	Denmark Open (Draw): Host: Odense, Denmark; Venue: Odense Sports Park; Level: Super 750; Prize: $750,000; Format: 32MS/32WS/32MD/32WD/32XD	(Japan) Nozomi Okuhara	(Spain) Carolina Marín
13–18 October	Denmark Open (Draw): Host: Odense, Denmark; Venue: Odense Sports Park; Level: Super 750; Prize: $750,000; Format: 32MS/32WS/32MD/32WD/32XD	Score: 21–19, 21–17	
13–18 October	Denmark Open (Draw): Host: Odense, Denmark; Venue: Odense Sports Park; Level: Super 750; Prize: $750,000; Format: 32MS/32WS/32MD/32WD/32XD	(England) Marcus Ellis (England) Chris Langridge	(Russia) Vladimir Ivanov (Russia) Ivan Sozonov
13–18 October	Denmark Open (Draw): Host: Odense, Denmark; Venue: Odense Sports Park; Level: Super 750; Prize: $750,000; Format: 32MS/32WS/32MD/32WD/32XD	Score: 20–22, 21–17, 21–18	
13–18 October	Denmark Open (Draw): Host: Odense, Denmark; Venue: Odense Sports Park; Level: Super 750; Prize: $750,000; Format: 32MS/32WS/32MD/32WD/32XD	(Japan) Yuki Fukushima (Japan) Sayaka Hirota	(Japan) Mayu Matsumoto (Japan) Wakana Nagahara
13–18 October	Denmark Open (Draw): Host: Odense, Denmark; Venue: Odense Sports Park; Level: Super 750; Prize: $750,000; Format: 32MS/32WS/32MD/32WD/32XD	Score: 21–10, 16–21, 21–18	
13–18 October	Denmark Open (Draw): Host: Odense, Denmark; Venue: Odense Sports Park; Level: Super 750; Prize: $750,000; Format: 32MS/32WS/32MD/32WD/32XD	(Germany) Mark Lamsfuß (Germany) Isabel Herttrich	(England) Chris Adcock (England) Gabby Adcock
13–18 October	Denmark Open (Draw): Host: Odense, Denmark; Venue: Odense Sports Park; Level: Super 750; Prize: $750,000; Format: 32MS/32WS/32MD/32WD/32XD	Score: 18–21, 21–11, 21–14	
20–25 October	(France) French Open (Draw) (cancelled): Host: Paris, France; Venue: TBD; Level: Super 750; Prize: $750,000; Format: 32MS/32WS/32MD/32WD/32XD		
20–25 October	(France) French Open (Draw) (cancelled): Host: Paris, France; Venue: TBD; Level: Super 750; Prize: $750,000; Format: 32MS/32WS/32MD/32WD/32XD	Score:	
20–25 October	(France) French Open (Draw) (cancelled): Host: Paris, France; Venue: TBD; Level: Super 750; Prize: $750,000; Format: 32MS/32WS/32MD/32WD/32XD	Score:	
20–25 October	(France) French Open (Draw) (cancelled): Host: Paris, France; Venue: TBD; Level: Super 750; Prize: $750,000; Format: 32MS/32WS/32MD/32WD/32XD	Score:	
20–25 October	(France) French Open (Draw) (cancelled): Host: Paris, France; Venue: TBD; Level: Super 750; Prize: $750,000; Format: 32MS/32WS/32MD/32WD/32XD	Score:	
20–25 October	(France) French Open (Draw) (cancelled): Host: Paris, France; Venue: TBD; Level: Super 750; Prize: $750,000; Format: 32MS/32WS/32MD/32WD/32XD	Score:	
20–25 October	New Zealand Open (Draw) (cancelled): Host: Auckland, New Zealand; Venue: Eventfinda Stadium; Level: Super 300; Prize: $170,000; Format: 32MS/32WS/32MD/32WD/32XD		
20–25 October	New Zealand Open (Draw) (cancelled): Host: Auckland, New Zealand; Venue: Eventfinda Stadium; Level: Super 300; Prize: $170,000; Format: 32MS/32WS/32MD/32WD/32XD	Score:	
20–25 October	New Zealand Open (Draw) (cancelled): Host: Auckland, New Zealand; Venue: Eventfinda Stadium; Level: Super 300; Prize: $170,000; Format: 32MS/32WS/32MD/32WD/32XD	Score:	
20–25 October	New Zealand Open (Draw) (cancelled): Host: Auckland, New Zealand; Venue: Eventfinda Stadium; Level: Super 300; Prize: $170,000; Format: 32MS/32WS/32MD/32WD/32XD	Score:	
20–25 October	New Zealand Open (Draw) (cancelled): Host: Auckland, New Zealand; Venue: Eventfinda Stadium; Level: Super 300; Prize: $170,000; Format: 32MS/32WS/32MD/32WD/32XD	Score:	
20–25 October	New Zealand Open (Draw) (cancelled): Host: Auckland, New Zealand; Venue: Eventfinda Stadium; Level: Super 300; Prize: $170,000; Format: 32MS/32WS/32MD/32WD/32XD	Score:	
27 October – 1 November	Macau Open (Draw) (cancelled): Host: Macau; Venue: TBD; Level: Super 300; Prize: $170,000; Format: 32MS/32WS/32MD/32WD/32XD		
27 October – 1 November	Macau Open (Draw) (cancelled): Host: Macau; Venue: TBD; Level: Super 300; Prize: $170,000; Format: 32MS/32WS/32MD/32WD/32XD	Score:	
27 October – 1 November	Macau Open (Draw) (cancelled): Host: Macau; Venue: TBD; Level: Super 300; Prize: $170,000; Format: 32MS/32WS/32MD/32WD/32XD	Score:	
27 October – 1 November	Macau Open (Draw) (cancelled): Host: Macau; Venue: TBD; Level: Super 300; Prize: $170,000; Format: 32MS/32WS/32MD/32WD/32XD	Score:	
27 October – 1 November	Macau Open (Draw) (cancelled): Host: Macau; Venue: TBD; Level: Super 300; Prize: $170,000; Format: 32MS/32WS/32MD/32WD/32XD	Score:	
27 October – 1 November	Macau Open (Draw) (cancelled): Host: Macau; Venue: TBD; Level: Super 300; Prize: $170,000; Format: 32MS/32WS/32MD/32WD/32XD	Score:	
27 October – 1 November	(Germany) SaarLorLux Open (Draw): Host: Saarbrücken, Germany; Venue: Saarlandhalle; Level: Super 100; Prize: $90,000; Format: 64MS/32WS/32MD/32WD/32XD	(France) Toma Junior Popov	(Netherlands) Mark Caljouw
27 October – 1 November	(Germany) SaarLorLux Open (Draw): Host: Saarbrücken, Germany; Venue: Saarlandhalle; Level: Super 100; Prize: $90,000; Format: 64MS/32WS/32MD/32WD/32XD	Score: 22–20, 19–21, 21–14	
27 October – 1 November	(Germany) SaarLorLux Open (Draw): Host: Saarbrücken, Germany; Venue: Saarlandhalle; Level: Super 100; Prize: $90,000; Format: 64MS/32WS/32MD/32WD/32XD	(Scotland) Kirsty Gilmour	(Germany) Yvonne Li
27 October – 1 November	(Germany) SaarLorLux Open (Draw): Host: Saarbrücken, Germany; Venue: Saarlandhalle; Level: Super 100; Prize: $90,000; Format: 64MS/32WS/32MD/32WD/32XD	Score: 21–10, 21–17	
27 October – 1 November	(Germany) SaarLorLux Open (Draw): Host: Saarbrücken, Germany; Venue: Saarlandhalle; Level: Super 100; Prize: $90,000; Format: 64MS/32WS/32MD/32WD/32XD	(Denmark) Jeppe Bay (Denmark) Lasse Mølhede	(Denmark) Daniel Lundgaard (Denmark) Mathias Thyrri
27 October – 1 November	(Germany) SaarLorLux Open (Draw): Host: Saarbrücken, Germany; Venue: Saarlandhalle; Level: Super 100; Prize: $90,000; Format: 64MS/32WS/32MD/32WD/32XD	Score: 21–13, 21–15	
27 October – 1 November	(Germany) SaarLorLux Open (Draw): Host: Saarbrücken, Germany; Venue: Saarlandhalle; Level: Super 100; Prize: $90,000; Format: 64MS/32WS/32MD/32WD/32XD	(Bulgaria) Gabriela Stoeva (Bulgaria) Stefani Stoeva	(Denmark) Amalie Magelund (Denmark) Freja Ravn
27 October – 1 November	(Germany) SaarLorLux Open (Draw): Host: Saarbrücken, Germany; Venue: Saarlandhalle; Level: Super 100; Prize: $90,000; Format: 64MS/32WS/32MD/32WD/32XD	Score: 21–8, 21–11	
27 October – 1 November	(Germany) SaarLorLux Open (Draw): Host: Saarbrücken, Germany; Venue: Saarlandhalle; Level: Super 100; Prize: $90,000; Format: 64MS/32WS/32MD/32WD/32XD	(Denmark) Mathias Christiansen (Denmark) Alexandra Bøje	(Germany) Mark Lamsfuß (Germany) Isabel Herttrich
27 October – 1 November	(Germany) SaarLorLux Open (Draw): Host: Saarbrücken, Germany; Venue: Saarlandhalle; Level: Super 100; Prize: $90,000; Format: 64MS/32WS/32MD/32WD/32XD	Score: 21–15, 19–21, 21–11	

=== November ===
Date	Tournament	Champions	Runners-up
3–8 November	Fuzhou China Open (Draw) (cancelled): Host: Fuzhou, China; Venue: TBD; Level: Super 750; Prize: $750,000; Format: 32MS/32WS/32MD/32WD/32XD		
3–8 November	Fuzhou China Open (Draw) (cancelled): Host: Fuzhou, China; Venue: TBD; Level: Super 750; Prize: $750,000; Format: 32MS/32WS/32MD/32WD/32XD	Score:	
3–8 November	Fuzhou China Open (Draw) (cancelled): Host: Fuzhou, China; Venue: TBD; Level: Super 750; Prize: $750,000; Format: 32MS/32WS/32MD/32WD/32XD	Score:	
3–8 November	Fuzhou China Open (Draw) (cancelled): Host: Fuzhou, China; Venue: TBD; Level: Super 750; Prize: $750,000; Format: 32MS/32WS/32MD/32WD/32XD	Score:	
3–8 November	Fuzhou China Open (Draw) (cancelled): Host: Fuzhou, China; Venue: TBD; Level: Super 750; Prize: $750,000; Format: 32MS/32WS/32MD/32WD/32XD	Score:	
3–8 November	Fuzhou China Open (Draw) (cancelled): Host: Fuzhou, China; Venue: TBD; Level: Super 750; Prize: $750,000; Format: 32MS/32WS/32MD/32WD/32XD	Score:	
10–15 November	Hong Kong Open (Draw) (cancelled): Host: Hong Kong; Venue: TBD; Level: Super 500; Prize: $400,000; Format: 32MS/32WS/32MD/32WD/32XD		
10–15 November	Hong Kong Open (Draw) (cancelled): Host: Hong Kong; Venue: TBD; Level: Super 500; Prize: $400,000; Format: 32MS/32WS/32MD/32WD/32XD	Score:	
10–15 November	Hong Kong Open (Draw) (cancelled): Host: Hong Kong; Venue: TBD; Level: Super 500; Prize: $400,000; Format: 32MS/32WS/32MD/32WD/32XD	Score:	
10–15 November	Hong Kong Open (Draw) (cancelled): Host: Hong Kong; Venue: TBD; Level: Super 500; Prize: $400,000; Format: 32MS/32WS/32MD/32WD/32XD	Score:	
10–15 November	Hong Kong Open (Draw) (cancelled): Host: Hong Kong; Venue: TBD; Level: Super 500; Prize: $400,000; Format: 32MS/32WS/32MD/32WD/32XD	Score:	
10–15 November	Hong Kong Open (Draw) (cancelled): Host: Hong Kong; Venue: TBD; Level: Super 500; Prize: $400,000; Format: 32MS/32WS/32MD/32WD/32XD	Score:	
17–22 November	Indonesia Open (Draw) (cancelled): Host: Jakarta, Indonesia; Venue: TBD; Level: Super 1000; Prize: $1,350,000; Format: 32MS/32WS/32MD/32WD/32XD		
17–22 November	Indonesia Open (Draw) (cancelled): Host: Jakarta, Indonesia; Venue: TBD; Level: Super 1000; Prize: $1,350,000; Format: 32MS/32WS/32MD/32WD/32XD	Score:	
17–22 November	Indonesia Open (Draw) (cancelled): Host: Jakarta, Indonesia; Venue: TBD; Level: Super 1000; Prize: $1,350,000; Format: 32MS/32WS/32MD/32WD/32XD	Score:	
17–22 November	Indonesia Open (Draw) (cancelled): Host: Jakarta, Indonesia; Venue: TBD; Level: Super 1000; Prize: $1,350,000; Format: 32MS/32WS/32MD/32WD/32XD	Score:	
17–22 November	Indonesia Open (Draw) (cancelled): Host: Jakarta, Indonesia; Venue: TBD; Level: Super 1000; Prize: $1,350,000; Format: 32MS/32WS/32MD/32WD/32XD	Score:	
17–22 November	Indonesia Open (Draw) (cancelled): Host: Jakarta, Indonesia; Venue: TBD; Level: Super 1000; Prize: $1,350,000; Format: 32MS/32WS/32MD/32WD/32XD	Score:	
17–22 November	(India) Syed Modi International (Draw) (cancelled): Host: Lucknow, India; Venue: TBD; Level: Super 300; Prize: $170,000; Format: 32MS/32WS/32MD/32WD/32XD		
17–22 November	(India) Syed Modi International (Draw) (cancelled): Host: Lucknow, India; Venue: TBD; Level: Super 300; Prize: $170,000; Format: 32MS/32WS/32MD/32WD/32XD	Score:	
17–22 November	(India) Syed Modi International (Draw) (cancelled): Host: Lucknow, India; Venue: TBD; Level: Super 300; Prize: $170,000; Format: 32MS/32WS/32MD/32WD/32XD	Score:	
17–22 November	(India) Syed Modi International (Draw) (cancelled): Host: Lucknow, India; Venue: TBD; Level: Super 300; Prize: $170,000; Format: 32MS/32WS/32MD/32WD/32XD	Score:	
17–22 November	(India) Syed Modi International (Draw) (cancelled): Host: Lucknow, India; Venue: TBD; Level: Super 300; Prize: $170,000; Format: 32MS/32WS/32MD/32WD/32XD	Score:	
17–22 November	(India) Syed Modi International (Draw) (cancelled): Host: Lucknow, India; Venue: TBD; Level: Super 300; Prize: $170,000; Format: 32MS/32WS/32MD/32WD/32XD	Score:	
24–29 November	Malaysia Open (Draw) (cancelled): Host: Kuala Lumpur, Malaysia; Venue: Axiata Arena; Level: Super 750; Prize: $750,000; Format: 32MS/32WS/32MD/32WD/32XD		
24–29 November	Malaysia Open (Draw) (cancelled): Host: Kuala Lumpur, Malaysia; Venue: Axiata Arena; Level: Super 750; Prize: $750,000; Format: 32MS/32WS/32MD/32WD/32XD	Score:	
24–29 November	Malaysia Open (Draw) (cancelled): Host: Kuala Lumpur, Malaysia; Venue: Axiata Arena; Level: Super 750; Prize: $750,000; Format: 32MS/32WS/32MD/32WD/32XD	Score:	
24–29 November	Malaysia Open (Draw) (cancelled): Host: Kuala Lumpur, Malaysia; Venue: Axiata Arena; Level: Super 750; Prize: $750,000; Format: 32MS/32WS/32MD/32WD/32XD	Score:	
24–29 November	Malaysia Open (Draw) (cancelled): Host: Kuala Lumpur, Malaysia; Venue: Axiata Arena; Level: Super 750; Prize: $750,000; Format: 32MS/32WS/32MD/32WD/32XD	Score:	
24–29 November	Malaysia Open (Draw) (cancelled): Host: Kuala Lumpur, Malaysia; Venue: Axiata Arena; Level: Super 750; Prize: $750,000; Format: 32MS/32WS/32MD/32WD/32XD	Score:	
24–29 November	(South Korea) Korea Masters (Draw) (cancelled) (Note: Update on Tournaments Grade 2, 3 and Junior cancelled due to the COVID-19 pandemic.): Host: Gwangju, South Korea; Venue: TBD; Level: Super 300; Prize: $200,000; Format: 32MS/32WS/32MD/32WD/32XD		
24–29 November	(South Korea) Korea Masters (Draw) (cancelled): Host: Gwangju, South Korea; Venue: TBD; Level: Super 300; Prize: $200,000; Format: 32MS/32WS/32MD/32WD/32XD	Score:	
24–29 November	(South Korea) Korea Masters (Draw) (cancelled): Host: Gwangju, South Korea; Venue: TBD; Level: Super 300; Prize: $200,000; Format: 32MS/32WS/32MD/32WD/32XD	Score:	
24–29 November	(South Korea) Korea Masters (Draw) (cancelled): Host: Gwangju, South Korea; Venue: TBD; Level: Super 300; Prize: $200,000; Format: 32MS/32WS/32MD/32WD/32XD	Score:	
24–29 November	(South Korea) Korea Masters (Draw) (cancelled): Host: Gwangju, South Korea; Venue: TBD; Level: Super 300; Prize: $200,000; Format: 32MS/32WS/32MD/32WD/32XD	Score:	
24–29 November	(South Korea) Korea Masters (Draw) (cancelled): Host: Gwangju, South Korea; Venue: TBD; Level: Super 300; Prize: $200,000; Format: 32MS/32WS/32MD/32WD/32XD	Score:	

=== December ===
Date	Tournament	Champions	Runners-up
8–13 December	India Open (Draw) (canceled): Host: New Delhi, India; Venue: K. D. Jadhav Indoor Hall; Level: Super 500; Prize: $400,000; Format: 32MS/32WS/32MD/32WD/32XD		
8–13 December	India Open (Draw) (canceled): Host: New Delhi, India; Venue: K. D. Jadhav Indoor Hall; Level: Super 500; Prize: $400,000; Format: 32MS/32WS/32MD/32WD/32XD	Score:	
8–13 December	India Open (Draw) (canceled): Host: New Delhi, India; Venue: K. D. Jadhav Indoor Hall; Level: Super 500; Prize: $400,000; Format: 32MS/32WS/32MD/32WD/32XD	Score:	
8–13 December	India Open (Draw) (canceled): Host: New Delhi, India; Venue: K. D. Jadhav Indoor Hall; Level: Super 500; Prize: $400,000; Format: 32MS/32WS/32MD/32WD/32XD	Score:	
8–13 December	India Open (Draw) (canceled): Host: New Delhi, India; Venue: K. D. Jadhav Indoor Hall; Level: Super 500; Prize: $400,000; Format: 32MS/32WS/32MD/32WD/32XD	Score:	
8–13 December	India Open (Draw) (canceled): Host: New Delhi, India; Venue: K. D. Jadhav Indoor Hall; Level: Super 500; Prize: $400,000; Format: 32MS/32WS/32MD/32WD/32XD	Score:	

=== January 2021 ===
Date	Tournament	Champions	Runners-up
12–17 January 2021	Yonex Thailand Open (Draw): Host: Pak Kret, Nonthaburi, Thailand; Venue: Impact Arena; Level: Super 1000; Prize: $1,000,000; Format: 32MS/32WS/32MD/32WD/32XD	(Denmark) Viktor Axelsen	(Hong Kong) Ng Ka Long
12–17 January 2021	Yonex Thailand Open (Draw): Host: Pak Kret, Nonthaburi, Thailand; Venue: Impact Arena; Level: Super 1000; Prize: $1,000,000; Format: 32MS/32WS/32MD/32WD/32XD	Score: 21–14, 21–14	
12–17 January 2021	Yonex Thailand Open (Draw): Host: Pak Kret, Nonthaburi, Thailand; Venue: Impact Arena; Level: Super 1000; Prize: $1,000,000; Format: 32MS/32WS/32MD/32WD/32XD	(Spain) Carolina Marín	(Chinese Taipei) Tai Tzu-ying
12–17 January 2021	Yonex Thailand Open (Draw): Host: Pak Kret, Nonthaburi, Thailand; Venue: Impact Arena; Level: Super 1000; Prize: $1,000,000; Format: 32MS/32WS/32MD/32WD/32XD	Score: 21–9, 21–16	
12–17 January 2021	Yonex Thailand Open (Draw): Host: Pak Kret, Nonthaburi, Thailand; Venue: Impact Arena; Level: Super 1000; Prize: $1,000,000; Format: 32MS/32WS/32MD/32WD/32XD	(Chinese Taipei) Lee Yang (Chinese Taipei) Wang Chi-lin	(Malaysia) Goh V Shem (Malaysia) Tan Wee Kiong
12–17 January 2021	Yonex Thailand Open (Draw): Host: Pak Kret, Nonthaburi, Thailand; Venue: Impact Arena; Level: Super 1000; Prize: $1,000,000; Format: 32MS/32WS/32MD/32WD/32XD	Score: 21–16, 21–23, 21–19	
12–17 January 2021	Yonex Thailand Open (Draw): Host: Pak Kret, Nonthaburi, Thailand; Venue: Impact Arena; Level: Super 1000; Prize: $1,000,000; Format: 32MS/32WS/32MD/32WD/32XD	(Indonesia) Greysia Polii (Indonesia) Apriyani Rahayu	(Thailand) Jongkolphan Kititharakul (Thailand) Rawinda Prajongjai
12–17 January 2021	Yonex Thailand Open (Draw): Host: Pak Kret, Nonthaburi, Thailand; Venue: Impact Arena; Level: Super 1000; Prize: $1,000,000; Format: 32MS/32WS/32MD/32WD/32XD	Score: 21–15, 21–12	
12–17 January 2021	Yonex Thailand Open (Draw): Host: Pak Kret, Nonthaburi, Thailand; Venue: Impact Arena; Level: Super 1000; Prize: $1,000,000; Format: 32MS/32WS/32MD/32WD/32XD	(Thailand) Dechapol Puavaranukroh (Thailand) Sapsiree Taerattanachai	(Indonesia) Praveen Jordan (Indonesia) Melati Daeva Oktavianti
12–17 January 2021	Yonex Thailand Open (Draw): Host: Pak Kret, Nonthaburi, Thailand; Venue: Impact Arena; Level: Super 1000; Prize: $1,000,000; Format: 32MS/32WS/32MD/32WD/32XD	Score: 21–3, 20–22, 21–18	
19–24 January 2021	Toyota Thailand Open (Draw): Host: Pak Kret, Nonthaburi, Thailand; Venue: Impact Arena; Level: Super 1000; Prize: $1,000,000; Format: 32MS/32WS/32MD/32WD/32XD	(Denmark) Viktor Axelsen	(Denmark) Hans-Kristian Vittinghus
19–24 January 2021	Toyota Thailand Open (Draw): Host: Pak Kret, Nonthaburi, Thailand; Venue: Impact Arena; Level: Super 1000; Prize: $1,000,000; Format: 32MS/32WS/32MD/32WD/32XD	Score: 21–11, 21–7	
19–24 January 2021	Toyota Thailand Open (Draw): Host: Pak Kret, Nonthaburi, Thailand; Venue: Impact Arena; Level: Super 1000; Prize: $1,000,000; Format: 32MS/32WS/32MD/32WD/32XD	(Spain) Carolina Marín	(Chinese Taipei) Tai Tzu-ying
19–24 January 2021	Toyota Thailand Open (Draw): Host: Pak Kret, Nonthaburi, Thailand; Venue: Impact Arena; Level: Super 1000; Prize: $1,000,000; Format: 32MS/32WS/32MD/32WD/32XD	Score: 21–19, 21–17	
19–24 January 2021	Toyota Thailand Open (Draw): Host: Pak Kret, Nonthaburi, Thailand; Venue: Impact Arena; Level: Super 1000; Prize: $1,000,000; Format: 32MS/32WS/32MD/32WD/32XD	(Chinese Taipei) Lee Yang (Chinese Taipei) Wang Chi-lin	(Malaysia) Aaron Chia (Malaysia) Soh Wooi Yik
19–24 January 2021	Toyota Thailand Open (Draw): Host: Pak Kret, Nonthaburi, Thailand; Venue: Impact Arena; Level: Super 1000; Prize: $1,000,000; Format: 32MS/32WS/32MD/32WD/32XD	Score: 21–13, 21–18	
19–24 January 2021	Toyota Thailand Open (Draw): Host: Pak Kret, Nonthaburi, Thailand; Venue: Impact Arena; Level: Super 1000; Prize: $1,000,000; Format: 32MS/32WS/32MD/32WD/32XD	(South Korea) Kim So-yeong (South Korea) Kong Hee-yong	(South Korea) Lee So-hee (South Korea) Shin Seung-chan
19–24 January 2021	Toyota Thailand Open (Draw): Host: Pak Kret, Nonthaburi, Thailand; Venue: Impact Arena; Level: Super 1000; Prize: $1,000,000; Format: 32MS/32WS/32MD/32WD/32XD	Score: 21–18, 21–19	
19–24 January 2021	Toyota Thailand Open (Draw): Host: Pak Kret, Nonthaburi, Thailand; Venue: Impact Arena; Level: Super 1000; Prize: $1,000,000; Format: 32MS/32WS/32MD/32WD/32XD	(Thailand) Dechapol Puavaranukroh (Thailand) Sapsiree Taerattanachai	(South Korea) Seo Seung-jae (South Korea) Chae Yoo-jung
19–24 January 2021	Toyota Thailand Open (Draw): Host: Pak Kret, Nonthaburi, Thailand; Venue: Impact Arena; Level: Super 1000; Prize: $1,000,000; Format: 32MS/32WS/32MD/32WD/32XD	Score: 21–16, 22–20	
27–31 January 2021	(Thailand) BWF World Tour Finals (Draw): Host: Pak Kret, Nonthaburi, Thailand; Venue: Impact Arena; Level: World Tour Finals; Prize: $1,500,000; Format: 8MS/8WS/8MD/8WD/8XD	(Denmark) Anders Antonsen	(Denmark) Viktor Axelsen
27–31 January 2021	(Thailand) BWF World Tour Finals (Draw): Host: Pak Kret, Nonthaburi, Thailand; Venue: Impact Arena; Level: World Tour Finals; Prize: $1,500,000; Format: 8MS/8WS/8MD/8WD/8XD	Score: 21–16, 5–21, 21–17	
27–31 January 2021	(Thailand) BWF World Tour Finals (Draw): Host: Pak Kret, Nonthaburi, Thailand; Venue: Impact Arena; Level: World Tour Finals; Prize: $1,500,000; Format: 8MS/8WS/8MD/8WD/8XD	(Chinese Taipei) Tai Tzu-ying	(Spain) Carolina Marín
27–31 January 2021	(Thailand) BWF World Tour Finals (Draw): Host: Pak Kret, Nonthaburi, Thailand; Venue: Impact Arena; Level: World Tour Finals; Prize: $1,500,000; Format: 8MS/8WS/8MD/8WD/8XD	Score: 14–21, 21–8, 21–19	
27–31 January 2021	(Thailand) BWF World Tour Finals (Draw): Host: Pak Kret, Nonthaburi, Thailand; Venue: Impact Arena; Level: World Tour Finals; Prize: $1,500,000; Format: 8MS/8WS/8MD/8WD/8XD	(Chinese Taipei) Lee Yang (Chinese Taipei) Wang Chi-lin	(Indonesia) Mohammad Ahsan (Indonesia) Hendra Setiawan
27–31 January 2021	(Thailand) BWF World Tour Finals (Draw): Host: Pak Kret, Nonthaburi, Thailand; Venue: Impact Arena; Level: World Tour Finals; Prize: $1,500,000; Format: 8MS/8WS/8MD/8WD/8XD	Score: 21–17, 23–21	
27–31 January 2021	(Thailand) BWF World Tour Finals (Draw): Host: Pak Kret, Nonthaburi, Thailand; Venue: Impact Arena; Level: World Tour Finals; Prize: $1,500,000; Format: 8MS/8WS/8MD/8WD/8XD	(South Korea) Lee So-hee (South Korea) Shin Seung-chan	(South Korea) Kim So-yeong (South Korea) Kong Hee-yong
27–31 January 2021	(Thailand) BWF World Tour Finals (Draw): Host: Pak Kret, Nonthaburi, Thailand; Venue: Impact Arena; Level: World Tour Finals; Prize: $1,500,000; Format: 8MS/8WS/8MD/8WD/8XD	Score: 15–21, 26–24, 21–19	
27–31 January 2021	(Thailand) BWF World Tour Finals (Draw): Host: Pak Kret, Nonthaburi, Thailand; Venue: Impact Arena; Level: World Tour Finals; Prize: $1,500,000; Format: 8MS/8WS/8MD/8WD/8XD	(Thailand) Dechapol Puavaranukroh (Thailand) Sapsiree Taerattanachai	(South Korea) Seo Seung-jae (South Korea) Chae Yoo-jung
27–31 January 2021	(Thailand) BWF World Tour Finals (Draw): Host: Pak Kret, Nonthaburi, Thailand; Venue: Impact Arena; Level: World Tour Finals; Prize: $1,500,000; Format: 8MS/8WS/8MD/8WD/8XD	Score: 21–18, 8–21, 21–8	

== Statistics ==
=== Performance by countries ===
Below are the 2020 BWF World Tour performances by countries. Only countries who have won a title are listed:

BWF World Tour

Rank	Team	BWTF	Super 1000			Super 750	Super 500		Super 300		Total
Rank	Team	THA	ENG	THA1	THA2	DEN	MAS	INA	THA	ESP	Total
1	Denmark	1	1	1	1	1				2	7
2	Japan		2			2	1		1		6
3	Indonesia		1	1				3		1	6
4	Chinese Taipei	2	1	1	1						5
5	Thailand	1		1	1			1		1	5
6	China						3	1	1		5
7	South Korea	1			1		1			1	4
8	Spain			1	1						2
9	England					1			1		2
10	Germany					1					1
11	Hong Kong								1		1
11	Malaysia								1		1

BWF Tour Super 100

Rank	Team	GER
1	Denmark	2
2	Bulgaria	1
2	France	1
2	Scotland	1

=== Performance by categories ===
Accurate as of XD final (5/5 matches) of the 2020 BWF World Tour Finals.

==== Men's singles ====
Rank	Player	BWTF	1000	750	500	300	100	Total
1	(Denmark) Viktor Axelsen		3			1		4
2	(Denmark) Anders Antonsen	1		1				2
3	(Indonesia) Anthony Sinisuka Ginting				1			1
3	(Japan) Kento Momota				1			1
5	(Hong Kong) Ng Ka Long					1		1
6	(France) Toma Junior Popov						1	1

==== Women's singles ====
Rank	Player	BWTF	1000	750	500	300	100	Total
1	(Chinese Taipei) Tai Tzu-ying	1	1					2
2	(Spain) Carolina Marín		2					2
3	(Japan) Nozomi Okuhara			1				1
4	(China) Chen Yufei				1			1
4	(Thailand) Ratchanok Intanon				1			1
6	(Japan) Akane Yamaguchi					1		1
6	(Thailand) Pornpawee Chochuwong					1		1
8	(Scotland) Kirsty Gilmour						1	1

==== Men's doubles ====
Rank	Players	BWTF	1000	750	500	300	100	Total
1	(Chinese Taipei) Lee Yang	1	2					3
1	(Chinese Taipei) Wang Chi-lin	1	2					3
3	(Japan) Hiroyuki Endo		1					1
3	(Japan) Yuta Watanabe		1					1
5	(England) Marcus Ellis			1				1
5	(England) Chris Langridge			1				1
7	(Indonesia) Marcus Fernaldi Gideon				1			1
7	(Indonesia) Kevin Sanjaya Sukamuljo				1			1
7	(South Korea) Kim Gi-jung				1			1
7	(South Korea) Lee Yong-dae				1			1
11	(Denmark) Kim Astrup					1		1
11	(Denmark) Anders Skaarup Rasmussen					1		1
11	(Malaysia) Ong Yew Sin					1		1
11	(Malaysia) Teo Ee Yi					1		1
15	(Denmark) Jeppe Bay						1	1
15	(Denmark) Lasse Mølhede						1	1

==== Women's doubles ====
Rank	Players	BWTF	1000	750	500	300	100	Total
1	(Indonesia) Greysia Polii		1		1	1		3
1	(Indonesia) Apriyani Rahayu		1		1	1		3
3	(Japan) Yuki Fukushima		1	1				2
3	(Japan) Sayaka Hirota		1	1				2
5	(South Korea) Lee So-hee	1						1
5	(South Korea) Shin Seung-chan	1						1
7	(South Korea) Kim So-yeong		1					1
7	(South Korea) Kong Hee-yong		1					1
9	(China) Li Wenmei				1			1
9	(China) Zheng Yu				1			1
11	(China) Chen Qingchen					1		1
11	(China) Jia Yifan					1		1
13	(Bulgaria) Gabriela Stoeva						1	1
13	(Bulgaria) Stefani Stoeva						1	1

==== Mixed doubles ====
Rank	Players	BWTF	1000	750	500	300	100	Total
1	(Thailand) Dechapol Puavaranukroh	1	2					3
1	(Thailand) Sapsiree Taerattanachai	1	2					3
3	(China) Zheng Siwei				2			2
3	(China) Huang Yaqiong				2			2
5	(Indonesia) Praveen Jordan		1					1
5	(Indonesia) Melati Daeva Oktavianti		1					1
7	(Germany) Mark Lamsfuß			1				1
7	(Germany) Isabel Herttrich			1				1
9	(England) Marcus Ellis					1		1
9	(England) Lauren Smith					1		1
9	(South Korea) Kim Ha-na					1		1
9	(South Korea) Kim Sa-rang					1		1
13	(Denmark) Mathias Christiansen						1	1
13	(Denmark) Alexandra Bøje						1	1

== World Tour Finals rankings ==
The points are calculated from the following tournaments:

1. 2019 Syed Modi International
2. 2020 Malaysia Masters
3. 2020 Indonesia Masters
4. 2020 Thailand Masters
5. 2020 Spain Masters
6. 2020 All England Open
7. 2020 Denmark Open
8. 2020 Yonex Thailand Open
9. 2020 Toyota Thailand Open

The player who will have the eligibility of 2020 BWF World Tour Finals needs to enter both 2020 Yonex Thailand Open and 2020 Toyota Thailand Open.

Information on Points, Won, Lost, and % columns were calculated after the 2020 BWF World Tour Finals.

Key

(D)C	(Defending) Champion
F	Finalists
SF	Semi-finalists
QF	Quarter-finalists
#R	Round 1/2/3
RR	Round Robin
Q#	Qualification Round 1/2

=== Men's singles ===
The table below is based on the ranking of men's singles as of 26 January 2021.

Rank		WR	Player	IND	MAS	INA	THA	ESP	ENG	DEN	THA1	THA2	TP	Points	THA		Won	Lost	%
Rank		WR	Player	300	500	500	300	300	1000	750	1000	1000	TP	Points	Eligibility	BWTF	Won	Lost	%
1	Steady	4	(Denmark) Viktor Axelsen	–	F	SF	–	DC	C	–	C	DC	6	57,220	Yes	F	31	3	91.2%
2	Steady	3	(Denmark) Anders Antonsen	–	1R	F	–	–	SF	C	1R	SF	6	40,820	Yes	C	19	6	76.0%
3	▲1	2	(Chinese Taipei) Chou Tien-chen	–	2R	1R	–	–	F	SF	SF	SF	6	40,520	Yes	SF	17	7	70.8%
4	▼1	17	(Denmark) Rasmus Gemke	–	2R	1R	–	QF	QF	F	QF	2R	7	37,020	No	–	12	7	63.1%
5	▲1	12	(Chinese Taipei) Wang Tzu-wei	C	1R	2R	2R	1R	QF	–	2R	QF	8	35,240	Yes	SF	15	8	65.2%
6	▼1	8	(Hong Kong) Ng Ka Long	–	SF	2R	C	–	1R	–	F	2R	6	35,020	Yes	RR	15	7	68.2%
7	Steady	14	(India) Srikanth Kidambi	QF	1R	1R	1R	2R	1R	QF	2R	2R	9	31,360	Yes	RR	7	12	36.8%
8	Steady	10	(Malaysia) Lee Zii Jia	–	SF	1R	2R	–	SF	–	QF	1R	6	29,390	Yes	RR	9	9	50.0%
9	▲2	6	(Indonesia) Anthony Sinisuka Ginting	–	1R	C	–	–	1R	–	SF	2R	5	27,620	Yes	RR	10	6	62.5%

=== Women's singles ===
The table below is based on the ranking of women's singles as of 26 January 2021.

Rank		WR	Player	IND	MAS	INA	THA	ESP	ENG	DEN	THA1	THA2	TP	Points	THA		Won	Lost	%
Rank		WR	Player	300	500	500	300	300	1000	750	1000	1000	TP	Points	Eligibility	BWTF	Won	Lost	%
1	Steady	6	(Spain) Carolina Marín	C	SF	F	SF	F	SF	F	C	DC	9	73,820	Yes	F	39	8	83.0%
2	Steady	1	(Chinese Taipei) Tai Tzu-ying	–	F	–	–	–	C	–	F	F	4	40,200	Yes	C	21	4	84.0%
3	Steady	5	(Thailand) Ratchanok Intanon	–	2R	C	QF	–	QF	–	QF	SF	6	38,250	Yes	RR	16	7	69.6%
4	Steady	9	(South Korea) An Se-young	2R	2R	QF	F	–	1R	–	SF	SF	7	37,140	Yes	SF	17	8	68.0%
5	▲1	13	(Thailand) Pornpawee Chochuwong	1R	1R	1R	2R	C	QF	–	2R	QF	8	33,860	Yes	SF	14	8	63.6%
6	▲3	10	(Canada) Michelle Li	–	–	QF	–	–	1R	SF	QF	QF	5	28,940	Yes	RR	9	8	52.9%
7	▼2	4	(Japan) Nozomi Okuhara	–	QF	2R	–	–	SF	C	–	–	4	28,040	No	–	11	3	78.6%
8	▼1	12	(Thailand) Busanan Ongbamrungphan	–	1R	2R	2R	SF	2R	–	QF	1R	7	27,870	No	–	8	7	53.3%
9	▼1	25	(Russia) Evgeniya Kosetskaya	QF	1R	1R	1R	1R	1R	2R	2R	1R	9	26,750	Yes	RR	5	11	31.3%
10	▲7	7	(India) P. V. Sindhu	–	QF	2R	–	–	QF	–	1R	QF	5	24,840	Yes	RR	7	8	46.7%

=== Men's doubles ===
The table below is based on the ranking of men's doubles as of 26 January 2021.

Rank		WR	Player	IND	MAS	INA	THA	ESP	ENG	DEN	THA1	THA2	TP	Points	THA		Won	Lost	%
Rank		WR	Player	300	500	500	300	300	1000	750	1000	1000	TP	Points	Eligibility	BWTF	Won	Lost	%
1	Steady	7	(Chinese Taipei) Lee Yang	–	QF	QF	2R	F	SF	–	C	DC	7	51,180	Yes	C	27	5	84.4%
1	Steady	7	(Chinese Taipei) Wang Chi-lin	–	QF	QF	2R	F	SF	–	C	DC	7	51,180	Yes	C	27	5	84.4%
2	▲5	9	(Malaysia) Aaron Chia	–	2R	SF	1R	SF	QF	–	1R	F	7	36,390	Yes	RR	14	9	60.9%
2	▲5	9	(Malaysia) Soh Wooi Yik	–	2R	SF	1R	SF	QF	–	1R	F	7	36,390	Yes	RR	14	9	60.9%
3	▲2	2	(Indonesia) Mohammad Ahsan	–	SF	F	–	–	QF	–	QF	SF	5	35,820	Yes	F	17	7	70.8%
3	▲2	2	(Indonesia) Hendra Setiawan	–	SF	F	–	–	QF	–	QF	SF	5	35,820	Yes	F	17	7	70.8%
4	Steady	15	(Malaysia) Ong Yew Sin	–	QF	QF	C	–	2R	–	QF	QF	6	35,080	Yes	RR	15	7	68.2%
4	Steady	15	(Malaysia) Teo Ee Yi	–	QF	QF	C	–	2R	–	QF	QF	6	35,080	Yes	RR	15	7	68.2%
5	▼3	24	(Russia) Vladimir Ivanov	QF	1R	1R	–	1R	SF	F	1R	1R	8	33,710	Yes	RR	10	10	50.0%
5	▼3	24	(Russia) Ivan Sozonov	QF	1R	1R	–	1R	SF	F	1R	1R	8	33,710	Yes	RR	10	10	50.0%
6	▼3	22	(England) Marcus Ellis	–	–	1R	QF	–	QF	C	QF	1R	6	33,270	Yes	RR	11	8	57.9%
6	▼3	22	(England) Chris Langridge	–	–	1R	QF	–	QF	C	QF	1R	6	33,270	Yes	RR	11	8	57.9%
7	▲1	32	(England) Ben Lane	2R	1R	1R	–	2R	1R	SF	2R	QF	8	32,040	Yes	SF	10	10	50.0%
7	▲1	32	(England) Sean Vendy	2R	1R	1R	–	2R	1R	SF	2R	QF	8	32,040	Yes	SF	10	10	50.0%
8	▲1	8	(South Korea) Choi Sol-gyu	1R	2R	1R	1R	–	1R	–	SF	2R	7	29,640	Yes	SF	7	9	43.8%
8	▲1	8	(South Korea) Seo Seung-jae	1R	2R	1R	1R	–	1R	–	SF	2R	7	29,640	Yes	SF	7	9	43.8%

=== Women's doubles ===
The table below is based on the ranking of women's doubles as of 26 January 2021.

Rank		WR	Player	IND	MAS	INA	THA	ESP	ENG	DEN	THA1	THA2	TP	Points	THA		Won	Lost	%
Rank		WR	Player	300	500	500	300	300	1000	750	1000	1000	TP	Points	Eligibility	BWTF	Won	Lost	%
1	Steady	8	(Indonesia) Greysia Polii	–	SF	C	–	C	1R	–	C	SF	6	46,020	Yes	RR	23	4	85.2%
1	Steady	8	(Indonesia) Apriyani Rahayu	–	SF	C	–	C	1R	–	C	SF	6	46,020	Yes	RR	23	4	85.2%
2	▲1	6	(South Korea) Kim So-yeong	–	QF	SF	SF	–	QF	–	SF	C	6	43,360	Yes	F	17	6	73.9%
2	▲1	6	(South Korea) Kong Hee-yong	–	QF	SF	SF	–	QF	–	SF	C	6	43,360	Yes	F	17	6	73.9%
3	▲2	4	(South Korea) Lee So-hee	–	QF	QF	QF	–	SF	–	SF	F	6	40,930	Yes	C	20	7	74.1%
3	▲2	4	(South Korea) Shin Seung-chan	–	QF	QF	QF	–	SF	–	SF	F	6	40,930	Yes	C	20	7	74.1%
4	▼2	9	(South Korea) Chang Ye-na	F	QF	QF	SF	–	QF	–	QF	1R	7	37,130	No	–	15	7	68.2%
4	▼2	9	(South Korea) Kim Hye-rin	F	QF	QF	SF	–	QF	–	QF	1R	7	37,130	No	–	15	7	68.2%
5	▼1	18	(England) Chloe Birch	QF	–	1R	2R	SF	2R	QF	QF	1R	8	34,170	Yes	RR	10	10	50.0%
5	▼1	18	(England) Lauren Smith	QF	–	1R	2R	SF	2R	QF	QF	1R	8	34,170	Yes	RR	10	10	50.0%
6	▲1	11	(Thailand) Jongkolphan Kititharakul	–	1R	1R	2R	SF	2R	–	F	QF	7	33,690	Yes	SF	12	9	57.1%
6	▲1	11	(Thailand) Rawinda Prajongjai	–	1R	1R	2R	SF	2R	–	F	QF	7	33,690	Yes	SF	12	9	57.1%
7	▼1	2	(Japan) Yuki Fukushima	–	2R	2R	–	–	C	C	–	–	4	30,200	No	–	11	2	84.6%
7	▼1	2	(Japan) Sayaka Hirota	–	2R	2R	–	–	C	C	–	–	4	30,200	No	–	11	2	84.6%
8	▲1	31	(Germany) Linda Efler	SF	1R	1R	1R	QF	1R	2R	1R	2R	9	29,980	Yes	RR	7	12	36.8%
8	▲1	31	(Germany) Isabel Herttrich	SF	1R	1R	1R	QF	1R	2R	1R	2R	9	29,980	Yes	RR	7	12	36.8%
9	▲2	14	(Malaysia) Chow Mei Kuan	–	–	2R	1R	QF	2R	–	2R	SF	6	29,340	Yes	SF	9	8	52.9%
9	▲2	14	(Malaysia) Lee Meng Yean	–	–	2R	1R	QF	2R	–	2R	SF	6	29,340	Yes	SF	9	8	52.9%
10	▲6	25	(Malaysia) Vivian Hoo Kah Mun	–	1R	1R	QF	2R	2R	–	2R	QF	7	26,160	Yes	RR	6	10	37.5%
10	▲6	25	(Malaysia) Yap Cheng Wen	–	1R	1R	QF	2R	2R	–	2R	QF	7	26,160	Yes	RR	6	10	37.5%

=== Mixed doubles ===
The table below is based on the ranking of mixed doubles as of 26 January 2021.

Rank		WR	Player	IND	MAS	INA	THA	ESP	ENG	DEN	THA1	THA2	TP	Points	THA		Won	Lost	%
Rank		WR	Player	300	500	500	300	300	1000	750	1000	1000	TP	Points	Eligibility	BWTF	Won	Lost	%
1	Steady	9	(England) Marcus Ellis	F	–	2R	C	QF	SF	SF	2R	2R	8	46,100	Yes	RR	20	10	66.7%
1	Steady	9	(England) Lauren Smith	F	–	2R	C	QF	SF	SF	2R	2R	8	46,100	Yes	RR	20	10	66.7%
2	Steady	17	(Germany) Mark Lamsfuß	SF	1R	1R	2R	2R	2R	C	QF	2R	9	42,040	Yes	RR	14	11	56.0%
2	Steady	17	(Germany) Isabel Herttrich	SF	1R	1R	2R	2R	2R	C	QF	2R	9	42,040	Yes	RR	14	11	56.0%
3	▲2	3	(Thailand) Dechapol Puavaranukroh	–	2R	2R	–	–	F	–	C	DC	5	41,400	Yes	C	20	4	83.3%
3	▲2	3	(Thailand) Sapsiree Taerattanachai	–	2R	2R	–	–	F	–	C	DC	5	41,400	Yes	C	20	4	83.3%
4	▼1	15	(France) Thom Gicquel	SF	2R	SF	–	F	2R	–	SF	2R	7	38,870	Yes	SF	19	8	70.4%
4	▼1	15	(France) Delphine Delrue	SF	2R	SF	–	F	2R	–	SF	2R	7	38,870	Yes	SF	19	8	70.4%
5	▼1	4	(Indonesia) Praveen Jordan	–	1R	QF	–	–	C	–	F	1R	5	32,460	Yes	RR	12	6	66.7%
5	▼1	4	(Indonesia) Melati Daeva Oktavianti	–	1R	QF	–	–	C	–	F	1R	5	32,460	Yes	RR	12	6	66.7%
6	▲9	6	(South Korea) Seo Seung-jae	–	1R	1R	–	–	SF	–	SF	F	5	31,440	Yes	F	14	6	70.0%
6	▲9	6	(South Korea) Chae Yoo-jung	–	1R	1R	–	–	SF	–	SF	F	5	31,440	Yes	F	14	6	70.0%
7	▲2	8	(Indonesia) Hafiz Faizal	–	SF	1R	F	–	QF	–	1R	QF	6	30,790	Yes	RR	12	7	63.2%
7	▲2	8	(Indonesia) Gloria Emanuelle Widjaja	–	SF	1R	F	–	QF	–	1R	QF	6	30,790	Yes	RR	12	7	63.2%
8	Steady	12	(Malaysia) Goh Soon Huat	–	QF	2R	SF	QF	1R	–	2R	2R	7	29,990	Yes	SF	12	9	57.1%
8	Steady	12	(Malaysia) Shevon Jemie Lai	–	QF	2R	SF	QF	1R	–	2R	2R	7	29,990	Yes	SF	12	9	57.1%
