= 2020 Spain Masters =

Badminton tournament in Barcelona

Tournament details
- Dates: 18–23 February
- Edition: 3rd
- Level: Super 300
- Total prize money: US$170,000
- Venue: Pavelló de la Vall d'Hebron
- Location: Barcelona, Spain

Champions
- Men's singles: (Denmark) Viktor Axelsen
- Women's singles: (Thailand) Pornpawee Chochuwong
- Men's doubles: (Denmark) Kim Astrup (Denmark) Anders Skaarup Rasmussen
- Women's doubles: (Indonesia) Greysia Polii (Indonesia) Apriyani Rahayu
- Mixed doubles: (South Korea) Kim Sa-rang (South Korea) Kim Ha-na

The 2020 Spain Masters (officially known as the Barcelona Spain Masters 2020) was a badminton tournament which was held at the Pavelló de la Vall d'Hebron in Barcelona, Spain, from 18 to 23 February 2020 with a total prize purse of $170,000.

== Tournament ==
The 2020 Spain Masters was the fourth tournament of the 2020 BWF World Tour and also part of the Spain Masters championships, which have been held since 2018. This tournament was organized by the Spanish Badminton Federation and sanctioned by the BWF.

=== Venue ===
This international tournament was held at the Pavelló de la Vall d'Hebron in Barcelona, Spain.

=== Point distribution ===
Below is the point distribution for each phase of the tournament based on the BWF points system for the BWF World Tour Super 300 event.

Winner	Runner-up	3/4	5/8	9/16	17/32	33/64	65/128
7,000	5,950	4,900	3,850	2,750	1,670	660	320

=== Prize money ===
The total prize money for this tournament was US$170,000. Distribution of prize money was in accordance with BWF regulations.

Event	Winner	Finals	Semi-finals	Quarter-finals	Last 16
Singles	$12,750	$6,460	$2,465	$1,020	$595
Doubles	$13,430	$6,460	$2,380	$1,232.50	$637.50

== Men's singles ==
=== Seeds ===
1. (Denmark) Viktor Axelsen (champion)
2. (India) B. Sai Praneeth (withdrew)
3. (India) Srikanth Kidambi (second round)
4. (Chinese Taipei) Wang Tzu-wei (first round)
5. (Denmark) Rasmus Gemke (quarter-finals)
6. (China) Lin Dan (withdrew)
7. (Denmark) Jan Ø. Jørgensen (quarter-finals)
8. (China) Lu Guangzu (withdrew)

=== Finals ===
Semi-finals
1	(Denmark) Viktor Axelsen	21	21
(Malaysia) Liew Daren	10	19
PFQ	(India) Ajay Jayaram	20	12
(Thailand) Kunlavut Vitidsarn	22	21

Final
1	(Denmark) Viktor Axelsen	21	21
(Thailand) Kunlavut Vitidsarn	16	13

=== Top half ===
==== Section 1 ====
First Round
1	(Denmark) V Axelsen	13	21	21
(Singapore) Loh K Y	21	14	15
(France) B Leverdez	21	16	21
(Denmark) H-K Vittinghus	10	21	13
7	(Denmark) J Ø. Jørgensen	21	21
Q3	(Chinese Taipei) Chang C-s	14	16
(England) T Penty	19	17
PFQ	(Russia) S Sirant	21	21

Second Round
1	(Denmark) V Axelsen	21	21
(France) B Leverdez	11	15
7	(Denmark) J Ø. Jørgensen	21	21
PFQ	(Russia) S Sirant	14	9

Quarter-finals
1	(Denmark) V Axelsen	21	21
7	(Denmark) J Ø. Jørgensen	8	5

==== Section 2 ====
First Round
4	(Chinese Taipei) Wang T-w	19	21	16
(France) L Corvée	21	16	21
(India) Prannoy K	18	15
(Malaysia) Liew D	21	21
5	(Denmark) R Gemke	21	21
PFQ	(Ukraine) A Pochtarov	8	15
(Brazil) Y Coelho de Oliveira	9	21	14
(India) P Kashyap	21	18	12^{r}

Second Round
(France) L Corvée	16	20
(Malaysia) Liew D	21	22
5	(Denmark) R Gemke	21	16	21
(Brazil) Y Coelho de Oliveira	19	21	13

Quarter-finals
(Malaysia) Liew D	16	21	21
5	(Denmark) R Gemke	21	17	17

=== Bottom half ===
==== Section 3 ====
First Round
(France) T Rouxel	22	21
Q1	(Denmark) K R Rajarajan	20	13
(France) T J Popov	14	21	21
PFQ	(Denmark) K Bruun	21	17	11
Q4	(France) C Popov	14	12
PFQ	(India) A Jayaram	21	21
(India) S Dey	21	18
3	(India) S Kidambi	23	21

Second Round
(France) T Rouxel	20	21	21
(France) T J Popov	22	16	13
PFQ	(India) A Jayaram	21	21
3	(India) S Kidambi	6	17

Quarter-finals
(France) T Rouxel	14	15
PFQ	(India) A Jayaram	21	21

==== Section 4 ====
First Round
(Thailand) K Vitidsarn	21	21
Q2	(Sweden) J Nilsson	18	16
(Sweden) F Burestedt	16	18
PFQ	(Republic of Ireland) N Nguyen	21	21
PFQ	(Germany) K Schäfer	13	21	21
(Israel) M Zilberman	21	12	13
(India) Sa Verma	21	21
PFQ	(France) L Claerbout	12	9

Second Round
(Thailand) K Vitidsarn	21	21
(Republic of Ireland) N Nguyen	9	10
PFQ	(Germany) K Schäfer	14	21	15
(India) Sa Verma	21	16	21

Quarter-finals
(Thailand) K Vitidsarn	17	21	21
(India) Sa Verma	21	17	12

== Women's singles ==
=== Seeds ===
1. (Spain) Carolina Marín (final)
2. (Denmark) Mia Blichfeldt (withdrew)
3. (Thailand) Busanan Ongbamrungphan (semi-finals)
4. (China) Wang Zhiyi (withdrew)
5. (India) Saina Nehwal (quarter-finals)
6. (Thailand) Pornpawee Chochuwong (champion)
7. (China) Han Yue (withdrew)
8. (China) Cai Yanyan (withdrew)

=== Finals ===
Semi-finals
1	(Spain) Carolina Marín	21	21
(Thailand) Supanida Katethong	16	16
3	(Thailand) Busanan Ongbamrungphan	21	15	12
6	(Thailand) Pornpawee Chochuwong	14	21	21

Final
1	(Spain) Carolina Marín	21	16	18
6	(Thailand) Pornpawee Chochuwong	11	21	21

=== Top half ===
==== Section 1 ====
First Round
1	(Spain) C Marín	21	21
(Russia) N Perminova	11	8
(Chinese Taipei) Pai Y-p	21	16	16
PFQ	(Netherlands) S de Visch Eijbergen	19	21	21
PFQ	(Denmark) I A Andersen	14	7
(United States) I Wang	21	21
Q3
(Thailand) P Chaiwan	w	/	o

Second Round
1	(Spain) C Marín	21	21
PFQ	(Netherlands) S de Visch Eijbergen	8	13
(United States) I Wang	18	22	17
(Thailand) P Chaiwan	21	20	21

Quarter-finals
1	(Spain) C Marín	21	21
(Thailand) P Chaiwan	18	12

==== Section 2 ====
First Round
PFQ	(Chinese Taipei) Chiang Y-l	21	21
PFR	(Belarus) K Zablotskaya	11	18
Q2	(Spain) M González	8	6
(Germany) F Deprez	21	21
PFQ	(Spain) C Azurmendi	19	23	14
(Thailand) S Katethong	21	21	21
(Switzerland) S Jaquet	21	21
(Israel) K Polikarpova	16	14

Second Round
PFQ	(Chinese Taipei) Chiang Y-l	21	21
(Germany) F Deprez	11	17
(Thailand) S Katethong	19	21	21
(Switzerland) S Jaquet	21	18	15

Quarter-finals
PFQ	(Chinese Taipei) Chiang Y-l	19	21	17
(Thailand) S Katethong	21	16	21

=== Bottom half ===
==== Section 3 ====
First Round
PFQ	(United States) I Zhong	16	16
PFQ	(Ukraine) M Ulitina	21	21
(Germany) Y Li	16	14
5	(India) S Nehwal	21	21
(Russia) E Kosetskaya	15	21	21
(Denmark) J D Jakobsen	21	11	23
(England) C Birch	10	10
3	(Thailand) B Ongbamrungphan	21	21

Second Round
PFQ	(Ukraine) M Ulitina	10	19
5	(India) S Nehwal	21	21
(Denmark) J D Jakobsen	9	11
3	(Thailand) B Ongbamrungphan	21	21

Quarter-finals
5	(India) S Nehwal	20	19
3	(Thailand) B Ongbamrungphan	22	21

==== Section 4 ====
First Round
Q1
Q4	(Spain) P Molins	w	/	o
(Belgium) L Tan	15	11
6	(Thailand) P Chochuwong	21	21
(Turkey) N Yiğit	21	13	21
(Denmark) L Christophersen	18	21	17
PFQ	(Finland) A Mikkelä	21	17	21
PFQ	(Czech Republic) T Švábíková	9	21	18

Second Round
Q4	(Spain) P Molins	2	8
6	(Thailand) P Chochuwong	21	21
(Turkey) N Yiğit	21	21
PFQ	(Finland) A Mikkelä	9	16

Quarter-finals
6	(Thailand) P Chochuwong	22	21
(Turkey) N Yiğit	20	9

== Men's doubles ==
=== Seeds ===
1. (Chinese Taipei) Lee Yang / Wang Chi-lin (final)
2. (Malaysia) Aaron Chia / Soh Wooi Yik (semi-finals)
3. (China) Han Chengkai / Zhou Haodong (withdrew)
4. (Denmark) Kim Astrup / Anders Skaarup Rasmussen (champions)
5. (Chinese Taipei) Liao Min-chun / Su Ching-heng (quarter-finals)
6. (Germany) Mark Lamsfuß / Marvin Emil Seidel (quarter-finals)
7. (Chinese Taipei) Lu Ching-yao / Yang Po-han (semi-finals)
8. (Denmark) Mathias Boe / Mads Conrad-Petersen (first round)

=== Finals ===
Semi-finals
1	(Chinese Taipei) Lee Yang (Chinese Taipei) Wang Chi-lin	21	21
7	(Chinese Taipei) Lu Ching-yao (Chinese Taipei) Yang Po-han	14	16
4	(Denmark) Kim Astrup (Denmark) Anders Skaarup Rasmussen	21	24
2	(Malaysia) Aaron Chia (Malaysia) Soh Wooi Yik	16	22

Final
1	(Chinese Taipei) Lee Yang (Chinese Taipei) Wang Chi-lin	17	19
4	(Denmark) Kim Astrup (Denmark) Anders Skaarup Rasmussen	21	21

=== Top half ===
==== Section 1 ====
First Round
1	(Chinese Taipei) Lee Y (Chinese Taipei) Wang C-l	21	21
(Russia) V Ivanov (Russia) I Sozonov	14	17
(India) P Chopra (India) K P Garaga	21	16	7
(England) B Lane (England) S Vendy	19	21	21
5	(Chinese Taipei) Liao M-c (Chinese Taipei) Su C-h	21	21
PFQ	(France) C Popov (France) T J Popov	17	18
PFQ	(Denmark) M P Kolding (Denmark) C Mogensen	14	19
(Malaysia) Goh S F (Malaysia) N Izzuddin	21	21

Second Round
1	(Chinese Taipei) Lee Y (Chinese Taipei) Wang C-l	22	21
(England) B Lane (England) S Vendy	20	17
5	(Chinese Taipei) Liao M-c (Chinese Taipei) Su C-h	17	21	21
(Malaysia) Goh S F (Malaysia) N Izzuddin	21	19	18

Quarter-finals
1	(Chinese Taipei) Lee Y (Chinese Taipei) Wang C-l	21	21
5	(Chinese Taipei) Liao M-c (Chinese Taipei) Su C-h	12	18

==== Section 2 ====
First Round
PFQ	(England) G Mairs (England) T Wolfenden	w	/	o
Q4
(United States) P Chew (United States) R Chew	9	17
(Thailand) B Isara (Thailand) M Jongjit	21	21
7	(Chinese Taipei) Lu C-y (Chinese Taipei) Yang P-ha	21	21
(Denmark) M Bay-Smidt (Denmark) L Mølhede	14	17
(Germany) J R Jansen (Germany) P Käsbauer	14	21	21
(Netherlands) J Maas (Netherlands) R Tabeling	21	19	16

Second Round
PFQ	(England) G Mairs (England) T Wolfenden	21	22
(Thailand) B Isara (Thailand) M Jongjit	16	20
7	(Chinese Taipei) Lu C-y (Chinese Taipei) Yang P-ha	11	21	21
(Germany) J R Jansen (Germany) P Käsbauer	21	16	14

Quarter-finals
PFQ	(England) G Mairs (England) T Wolfenden	15	14
7	(Chinese Taipei) Lu C-y (Chinese Taipei) Yang P-ha	21	21

=== Bottom half ===
==== Section 3 ====
First Round
(Indonesia) M S Fikri (Indonesia) B Maulana	21	19	21
Q1	(France) R Labar (France) B Leverdez	13	21	19
(Chinese Taipei) Lee J-h (Chinese Taipei) Yang P-hs	22	21
8	(Denmark) M Boe (Denmark) M Conrad-Petersen	20	19
(South Korea) Kim G-j (South Korea) Lee Y-d	21	21
PFQ	(Indonesia) P Kusumawardana (Indonesia) Y Rambitan	16	14
(Indonesia) L R Carnando (Indonesia) D Marthin	15	18
4	(Denmark) K Astrup (Denmark) A S Rasmussen	21	21

Second Round
(Indonesia) M S Fikri (Indonesia) B Maulana	16	11
(Chinese Taipei) Lee J-h (Chinese Taipei) Yang P-hs	21	21
(South Korea) Kim G-j (South Korea) Lee Y-d	19	21	20
4	(Denmark) K Astrup (Denmark) A S Rasmussen	21	14	22

Quarter-finals
(Chinese Taipei) Lee J-h (Chinese Taipei) Yang P-hs	11	12
4	(Denmark) K Astrup (Denmark) A S Rasmussen	21	21

==== Section 4 ====
First Round
(Chinese Taipei) Lin C-y (Chinese Taipei) Yang M-t	21	21
PFQ	(Denmark) D Lungaard (Denmark) M Thyrri	6	11
(South Korea) Kim D-y (South Korea) Kim S-r	21	13	12
6	(Germany) M Lamsfuß (Germany) M E Seidel	16	21	21
Q3	(Spain) S Alcala (Spain) I Valenzuela	9	9
(Germany) B Geiss (Germany) J C Völker	21	21
Q2	(Spain) O Altimira (Spain) J Comella	8	4
2	(Malaysia) A Chia (Malaysia) Soh W Y	21	21

Second Round
(Chinese Taipei) Lin C-y (Chinese Taipei) Yang M-t	17	12
6	(Germany) M Lamsfuß (Germany) M E Seidel	21	21
(Germany) B Geiss (Germany) J C Völker	15	18
2	(Malaysia) A Chia (Malaysia) Soh W Y	21	21

Quarter-finals
6	(Germany) M Lamsfuß (Germany) M E Seidel	18	13
2	(Malaysia) A Chia (Malaysia) Soh W Y	21	21

== Women's doubles ==
=== Seeds ===
1. (Indonesia) Greysia Polii / Apriyani Rahayu (champions)
2. (Thailand) Jongkolphan Kititharakul / Rawinda Prajongjai (semi-finals)
3. (Bulgaria) Gabriela Stoeva / Stefani Stoeva (final)
4. (Malaysia) Chow Mei Kuan / Lee Meng Yean (quarter-finals)
5. (Denmark) Maiken Fruergaard / Sara Thygesen (withdrew)
6. (England) Chloe Birch / Lauren Smith (semi-finals)
7. (Netherlands) Selena Piek / Cheryl Seinen (quarter-finals)
8. (Chinese Taipei) Hsu Ya-ching / Hu Ling-fang (quarter-finals)

=== Finals ===
Semi-finals
1	(Indonesia) Greysia Polii (Indonesia) Apriyani Rahayu	20	21	21
6	(England) Chloe Birch (England) Lauren Smith	22	16	10
3	(Bulgaria) Gabriela Stoeva (Bulgaria) Stefani Stoeva	21	16	21
2	(Thailand) Jongkolphan Kititharakul (Thailand) Rawinda Prajongjai	14	21	9

Final
1	(Indonesia) Greysia Polii (Indonesia) Apriyani Rahayu	18	22	21
3	(Bulgaria) Gabriela Stoeva (Bulgaria) Stefani Stoeva	21	20	17

=== Top half ===
==== Section 1 ====
First Round
(Denmark) A Bøje (Denmark) M Poulsen	w	/	o
(China) Huang J (China) Zhang SX

Second Round
1	(Indonesia) G Polii (Indonesia) A Rahayu	w	/	o
(China) Chen YY (China) Qiao SJ
8	(Chinese Taipei) Hsu Y-c (Chinese Taipei) Hu L-f	21	27
(Denmark) A Bøje (Denmark) M Poulsen	15	25

Quarter-finals
1	(Indonesia) G Polii (Indonesia) A Rahayu	20	21	21
8	(Chinese Taipei) Hsu Y-c (Chinese Taipei) Hu L-f	22	11	19

==== Section 2 ====
First Round
(Russia) A Akchurina (Russia) O Morozova	21	21
(Spain) M González (Spain) P Molins	11	7

Second Round
4	(Malaysia) Chow M K (Malaysia) Lee M Y	21	12	21
(Malaysia) V Hoo K M (Malaysia) Yap C W	15	21	16
6	(England) C Birch (England) L Smith	21	21
(Russia) A Akchurina (Russia) O Morozova	18	17

Quarter-finals
4	(Malaysia) Chow M K (Malaysia) Lee M Y	21	14	19
6	(England) C Birch (England) L Smith	15	21	21

=== Bottom half ===
==== Section 3 ====
First Round
(Germany) L Efler (Germany) I Herttrich	10	21	21
(Denmark) J Finne-Ipsen (Denmark) M Surrow	21	19	17
(India) A Ponnappa (India) N. S Reddy	w	/	o
(China) Chen L (China) Xu Y

Second Round
(Germany) L Efler (Germany) I Herttrich	w	/	o
5	(Denmark) M Fruergaard (Denmark) S Thygesen
(India) A Ponnappa (India) N. S Reddy	18	14
3	(Bulgaria) G Stoeva (Bulgaria) S Stoeva	21	21

Quarter-finals
(Germany) L Efler (Germany) I Herttrich	8	10
3	(Bulgaria) G Stoeva (Bulgaria) S Stoeva	21	21

==== Section 4 ====
First Round
(Russia) E Bolotova (Russia) A Davletova	w	/	o
(Spain) P Lopez (Spain) L Uslé

Second Round
(Russia) E Bolotova (Russia) A Davletova	13	14
7	(Netherlands) S Piek (Netherlands) C Seinen	21	21
(England) J Moore (England) V Williams	7	8
2	(Thailand) J Kititharakul (Thailand) R Prajongjai	21	21

Quarter-finals
7	(Netherlands) S Piek (Netherlands) C Seinen	13	25
2	(Thailand) J Kititharakul (Thailand) R Prajongjai	21	27

== Mixed doubles ==
=== Seeds ===
1. (Malaysia) Goh Soon Huat / Shevon Jemie Lai (quarter-finals)
2. (Malaysia) Tan Kian Meng / Lai Pei Jing (second round)
3. (England) Chris Adcock / Gabby Adcock (first round)
4. (England) Marcus Ellis / Lauren Smith (quarter-finals)
5. (Netherlands) Robin Tabeling / Selena Piek (first round)
6. (France) Thom Gicquel / Delphine Delrue (final)
7. (Germany) Mark Lamsfuß / Isabel Herttrich (second round)
8. (Chinese Taipei) Wang Chi-lin / Cheng Chi-ya (first round)

=== Finals ===
Semi-finals
(South Korea) Kim Sa-rang (South Korea) Kim Ha-na	14	21	21
(Denmark) Mathias Bay-Smidt (Denmark) Rikke Søby Hansen	21	11	15
(Chinese Taipei) Yang Po-hsuan (Chinese Taipei) Hu Ling-fang	16	13
6	(France) Thom Gicquel (France) Delphine Delrue	21	21

Final
(South Korea) Kim Sa-rang (South Korea) Kim Ha-na	15	21	21
6	(France) Thom Gicquel (France) Delphine Delrue	21	11	10

=== Top half ===
==== Section 1 ====
First Round
1	(Malaysia) Goh S H (Malaysia) S J Lai	21	21
PFQ	(Israel) M Zilberman (Belarus) K Zablotskaya	12	11
(India) P Chopra (India) N. S Reddy	10	21	21
(Denmark) M Christiansen (Denmark) A Bøje	21	16	17
5	(Netherlands) R Tabeling (Netherlands) S Piek	19	22
(South Korea) Kim S-r (South Korea) Kim H-n	21	24
Q3	(Thailand) K Vitidsarn (Thailand) P Chaiwan	21	21
PFQ	(United States) M Fogarty (United States) I Zhong	7	6

Second Round
1	(Malaysia) Goh S H (Malaysia) S J Lai	21	17	21
(India) P Chopra (India) N. S Reddy	16	21	11
(South Korea) Kim S-r (South Korea) Kim H-n	21	21
Q3	(Thailand) K Vitidsarn (Thailand) P Chaiwan	19	14

Quarter-finals
1	(Malaysia) Goh S H (Malaysia) S J Lai	18	18
(South Korea) Kim S-r (South Korea) Kim H-n	21	21

==== Section 2 ====
First Round
3	(England) C Adcock (England) G Adcock	19	21
(Germany) J R Jansen (Germany) K Ostermeyer	21	23
(France) R Labar (France) A Tran	19	16
(Denmark) M Bay-Smidt (Denmark) R Søby Hansen	21	21
8	(Chinese Taipei) Wang C-l (Chinese Taipei) Cheng C-y	13	17
PFQ	(Russia) V Ivanov (Russia) E Bolotova	21	21
(England) C Hemming (England) J Pugh	21	21
PFQ	(Germany) B Geiss (Germany) E Moszczynski	13	19

Second Round
(Germany) J R Jansen (Germany) K Ostermeyer	16	21	20
(Denmark) M Bay-Smidt (Denmark) R Søby Hansen	21	18	22
PFQ	(Russia) V Ivanov (Russia) E Bolotova	21	21
(England) C Hemming (England) J Pugh	17	12

Quarter-finals
(Denmark) M Bay-Smidt (Denmark) R Søby Hansen	21	26	21
PFQ	(Russia) V Ivanov (Russia) E Bolotova	23	24	12

=== Bottom half ===
==== Section 3 ====
First Round
Q2
(Chinese Taipei) Yang Po-hs (Chinese Taipei) Hu L-f	w	/	o
Q1
7	(Germany) M Lamsfuß (Germany) I Herttrich	w	/	o
(England) T Wolfenden (England) J Moore	21	18	21
(Russia) E Dremin (Russia) E Dimova	15	21	11
(England) G Mairs (England) V Williams	9	29	16
4	(England) M Ellis (England) L Smith	21	27	21

Second Round
(Chinese Taipei) Yang Po-hs (Chinese Taipei) Hu L-f	11	21	21
7	(Germany) M Lamsfuß (Germany) I Herttrich	21	17	15
(England) T Wolfenden (England) J Moore	21	14	15
4	(England) M Ellis (England) L Smith	15	21	21

Quarter-finals
(Chinese Taipei) Yang Po-hs (Chinese Taipei) Hu L-f	21	22
4	(England) M Ellis (England) L Smith	17	20

==== Section 4 ====
First Round
(Denmark) M Thyrri (Denmark) M Surrow	w	/	o
Q4
PFQ	(Denmark) D Lungaard (Denmark) J Finne-Ipsen	16	11
6	(France) T Gicquel (France) D Delrue	21	21
(Republic of Ireland) S Magee (Republic of Ireland) C Magee	18	13
(Chinese Taipei) Lee J-h (Chinese Taipei) Hsu Y-c	21	21
(Russia) R Alimov (Russia) A Davletova	21	17	19
2	(Malaysia) Tan K M (Malaysia) Lai P J	18	21	21

Second Round
(Denmark) M Thyrri (Denmark) M Surrow	14	22	15
6	(France) T Gicquel (France) D Delrue	21	20	21
(Chinese Taipei) Lee J-h (Chinese Taipei) Hsu Y-c	21	21
2	(Malaysia) Tan K M (Malaysia) Lai P J	19	18

Quarter-finals
6	(France) T Gicquel (France) D Delrue	17	21	21
(Chinese Taipei) Lee J-h (Chinese Taipei) Hsu Y-c	21	18	19

Preceded by 2019 Spain Masters	Spain Masters	Succeeded by 2021 Spain Masters
Preceded by 2020 Thailand Masters	BWF World Tour; 2020 BWF season	Succeeded by 2020 Lingshui China Masters (original); 2020 All England Open (eventual)
