= Mathias Thyrri =

Danish badminton player (born 1997)

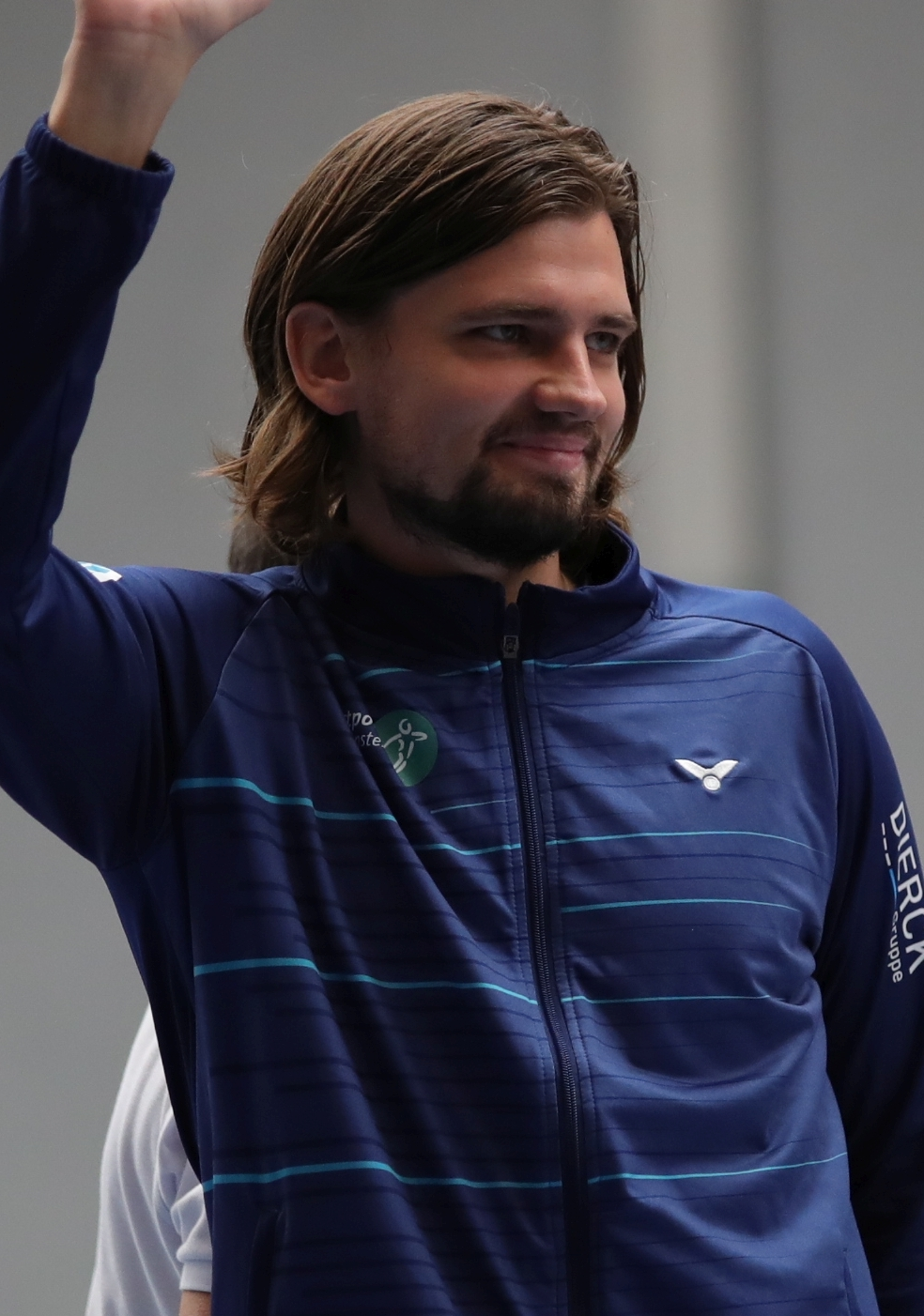
- Thyrri in 2025

Personal information
- Born: Mathias Thyrri Jørgensen; 29 August 1997 (age 29) Denmark
- Years active: 2015–present
- Height: 1.96 m (6 ft 5 in)

Sport
- Country: Denmark
- Sport: Badminton
- Handedness: Left

Men's & mixed doubles
- Highest ranking: 44 (MD with Daniel Lundgaard, 16 November 2021); 20 (XD with Amalie Magelund, 19 March 2024)
- BWF profile
Medal record
Men's badminton
Representing Denmark
European Championships
Bronze medal – third place	2024 Saarbrücken	Mixed doubles
European Men's Team Championships
Gold medal – first place	2024 Łódź	Men's team
European Mixed Team Championships
Gold medal – first place	2023 Aire-sur-la-Lys	Mixed team

Mathias Thyrri Jørgensen (born 26 August 1997) is a Danish badminton player, specializing in doubles play.

== Career ==
=== 2023 ===
In July, at the Canada Open, Thyrri and his partner, Amalie Magelund, faced a tough defeat in the mixed doubles final after an intense three-set match against the Japanese pair, Hiroki Midorikawa and Natsu Saito. One week later, the pair reached their second final in two weeks at the US Open. However, they were once again defeated in a three-set match, this time by the Taiwanese pair Ye Hong-wei and Lee Chia-hsin.

=== 2024 ===
In February, Thyrri was part of the Danish men's national team that won the gold medal in 2024 European Men's Team Championships after defeating France in the final. At the 2024 European Badminton Championships in April, he and Magelund reached the semi-finals in the mixed doubles event, but their journey ended after losing to the French pair, Thom Gicquel and Delphine Delrue, in a three-set match.

== Achievements ==
=== European Championships ===
Mixed doubles
Year	Venue	Partner	Opponent	Score	Result
2024	Saarlandhalle; Saarbrücken, Germany	(Denmark) Amalie Magelund	(France) Thom Gicquel (France) Delphine Delrue	20–22, 21–16, 13–21	Bronze

=== BWF World Tour (3 runners-up) ===
The BWF World Tour, which was announced on 19 March 2017 and implemented in 2018, is a series of elite badminton tournaments sanctioned by the Badminton World Federation (BWF). The BWF World Tour is divided into levels of World Tour Finals, Super 1000, Super 750, Super 500, Super 300, and the BWF Tour Super 100.

Men's doubles
Year	Tournament	Level	Partner	Opponent	Score	Result
2020	SaarLorLux Open	Super 100	(Denmark) Daniel Lundgaard	(Denmark) Jeppe Bay (Denmark) Lasse Mølhede	13–21, 15–21	(silver) Runner-up

Mixed doubles
Year	Tournament	Level	Partner	Opponent	Score	Result
2023	Canada Open	Super 500	(Denmark) Amalie Magelund	(Japan) Hiroki Midorikawa (Japan) Natsu Saito	17–21, 21–16, 13–21	(silver) Runner-up
2023	U.S. Open	Super 300	(Denmark) Amalie Magelund	(Chinese Taipei) Ye Hong-wei (Chinese Taipei) Lee Chia-hsin	21–13, 6–21, 18–21	(silver) Runner-up

=== BWF International Challenge/Series (5 titles, 3 runners-up) ===
Men's doubles
Year	Tournament	Partner	Opponent	Score	Result
2017	Turkey International	(Denmark) Mikkel Stoffersen	(Scotland) Adam Hall (Scotland) Alexander Dunn	14–21, 9–21	(silver) Runner-up
2017	Bulgarian Open	(Denmark) Søren Toft Hansen	(Denmark) Jeppe Bay (Denmark) Rasmus Kjær	21–16, 21–12	(gold) Winner
2019	Dutch International	(Denmark) Daniel Lundgaard	(New Zealand) Oliver Leydon-Davis (New Zealand) Abhinav Manota	21–16, 15–21, 21–16	(gold) Winner
2021	Denmark Masters	(Denmark) Daniel Lundgaard	(France) Ronan Labar (France) Lucas Corvée	24–22, 21–19	(gold) Winner

Mixed doubles
Year	Tournament	Partner	Opponent	Score	Result
2017	Bulgarian Open	(Denmark) Emilie Aalestrup	(Bulgaria) Alex Vlaar (Netherlands) Iris Tabeling	21–23, 15–21	(silver) Runner-up
2019	Dutch International	(Denmark) Elisa Melgaard	(France) Vimala Hériau (France) William Villeger	21–14, 16–21, 21–12	(gold) Winner
2020	Swedish Internasional	(Denmark) Mai Surrow	(Japan) Yujiro Nishikawa (Japan) Saori Ozaki	17–21, 11–21	(silver) Runner-up
2022	Canadian International	(Denmark) Amalie Magelund	(Germany) Jan Colin Völker (Germany) Stine Küspert	21–17, 21–16	(gold) Winner

BWF International Challenge tournament
BWF International Series tournament
BWF Future Series tournament
