= Badminton at the 2018 Summer Youth Olympics – Girls' singles =

Girls' singles at the III Summer Youth Olympic Games
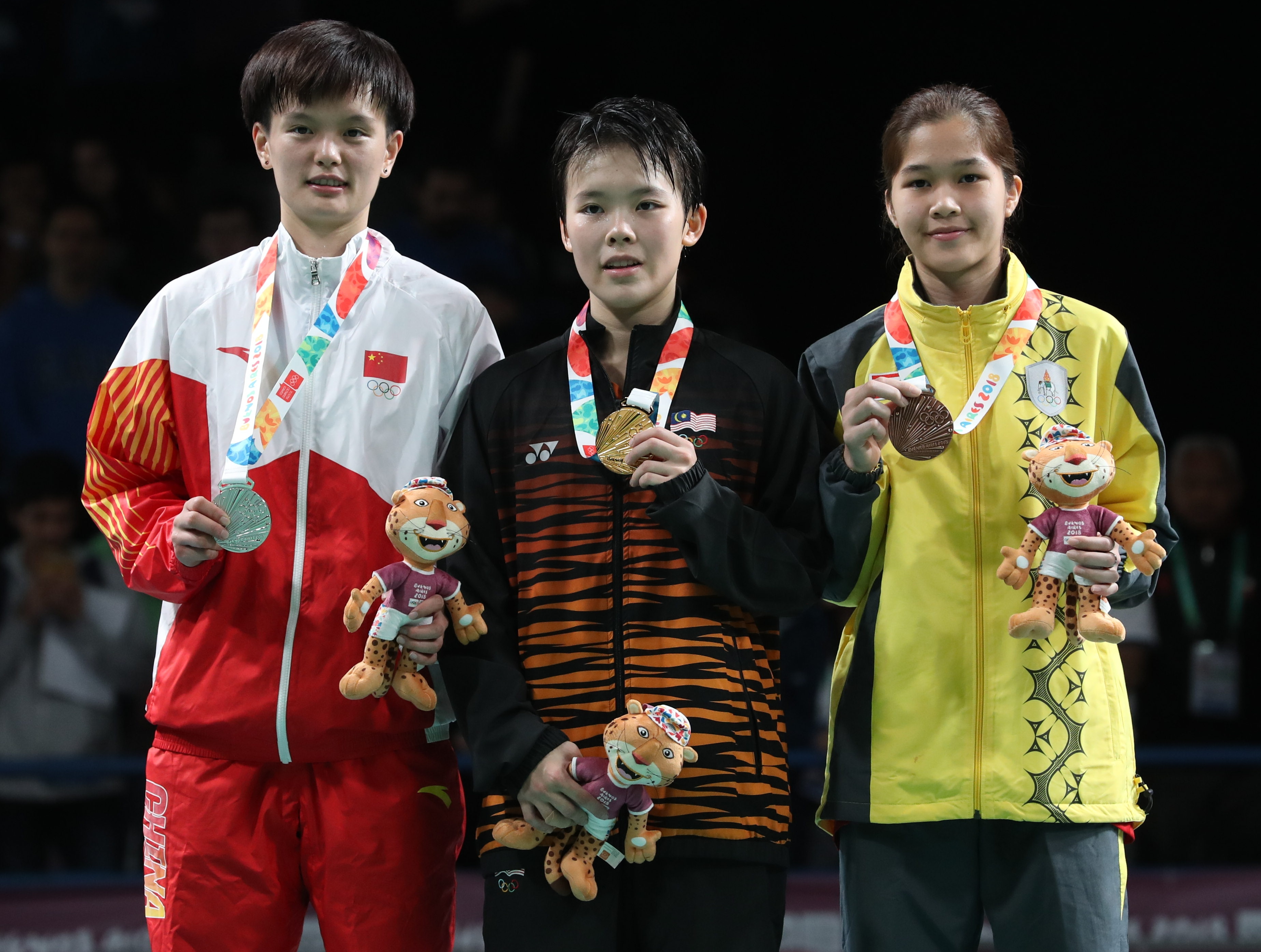
- Venue: Tecnópolis
- Dates: 7–12 October
- Competitors: 31 from 31 nations

Medalists
1st place, gold medalist(s)		Goh Jin Wei	Malaysia
2nd place, silver medalist(s)		Wang Zhiyi	China
3rd place, bronze medalist(s)		Phittayaporn Chaiwan	Thailand

These are the results for the girls' singles event at the 2018 Summer Youth Olympics.

== Seeds ==
1. Phittayaporn Chaiwan (THA) (bronze medal)
2. Wang Zhiyi (CHN) (silver medal)
3. Goh Jin Wei (MAS) (gold medal)
4. Jakka Vaishnavi Reddy (IND) (group stage)
5. Maria Delcheva (BUL) (group stage)
6. Huang Yin-hsuan (TPE) (quarter-finals)
7. Vivien Sándorházi (HUN) (quarter-finals)
8. Tereza Švábíková (CZE) (group stage)
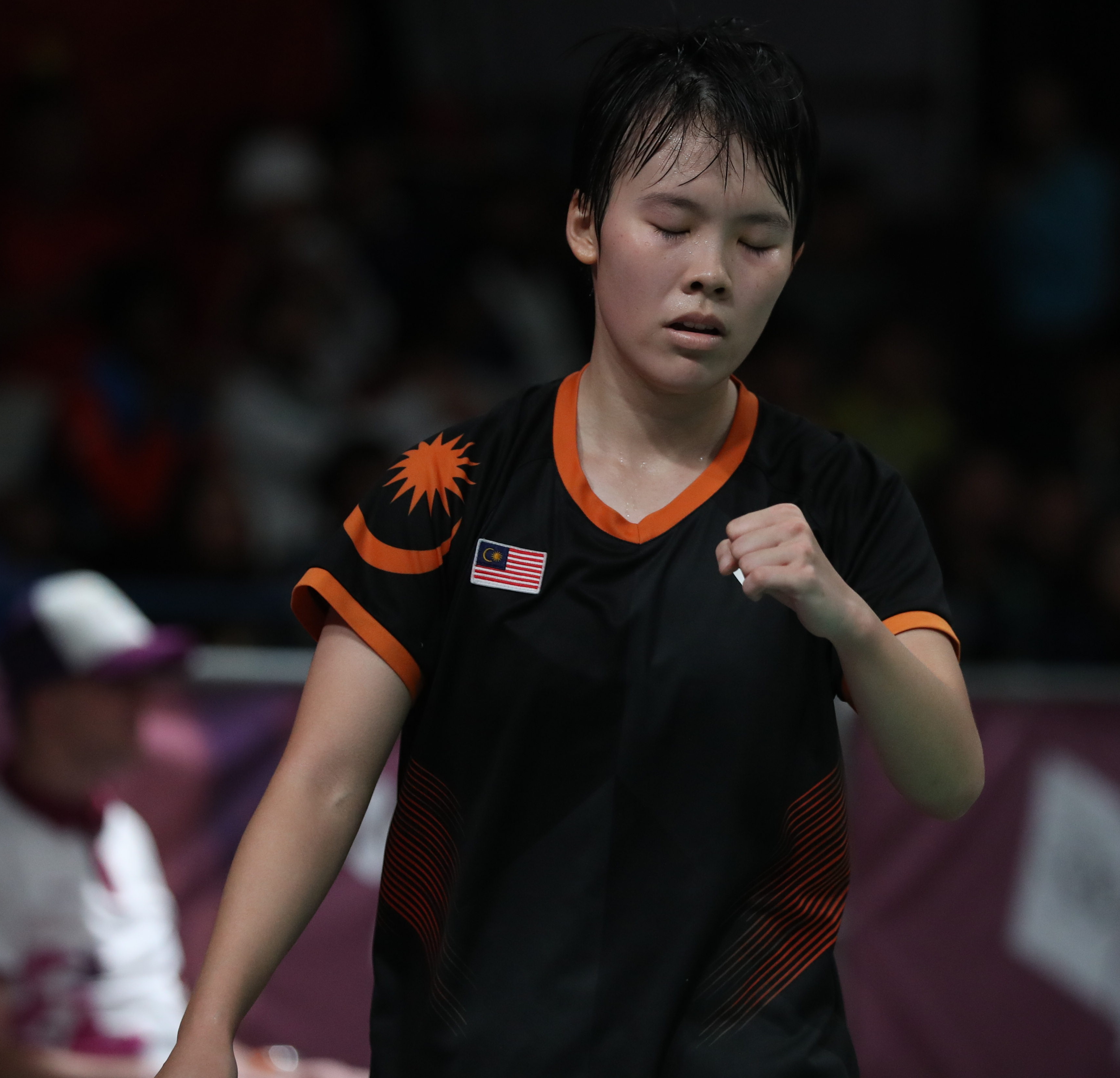
Goh Jin Wei

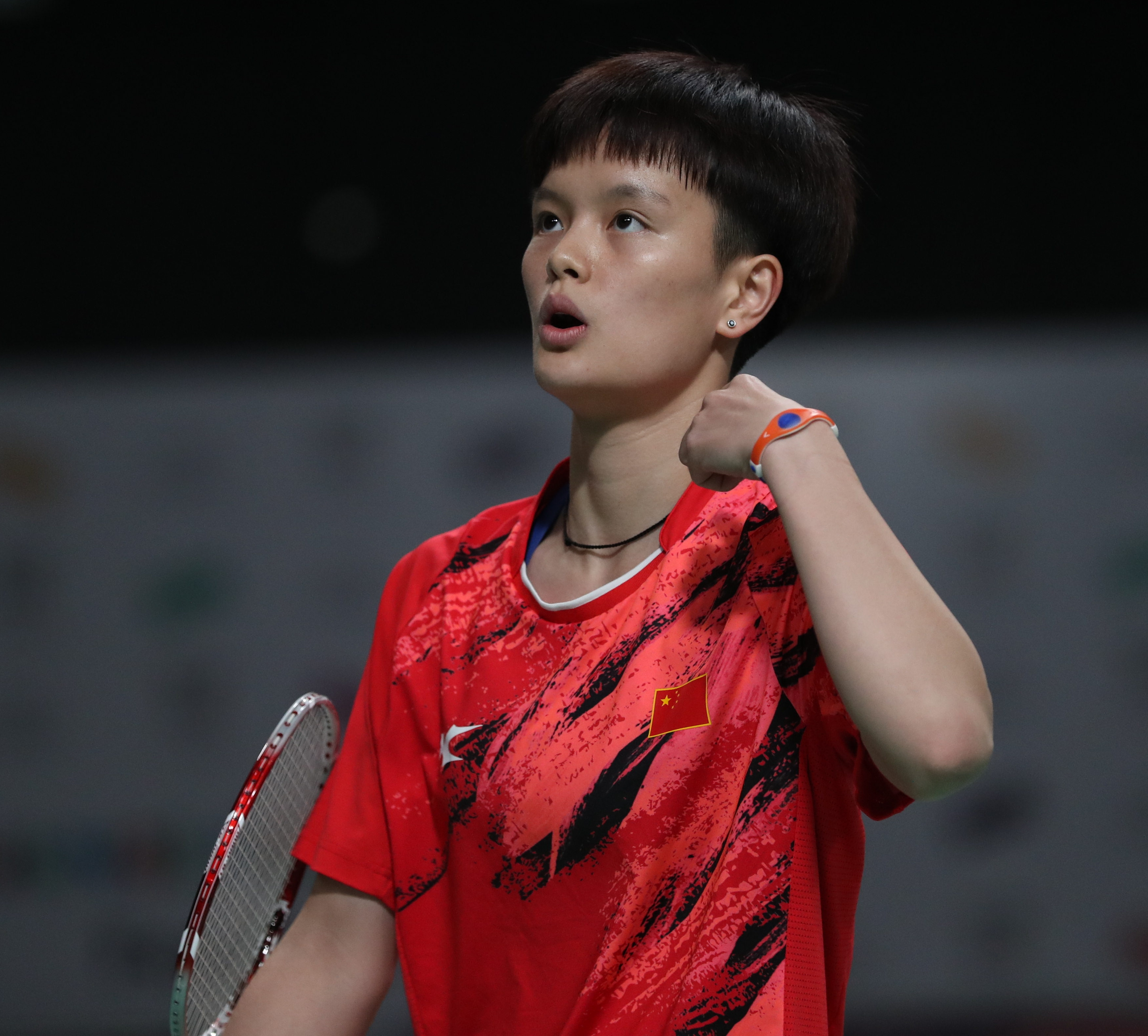
Wang Zhiyi

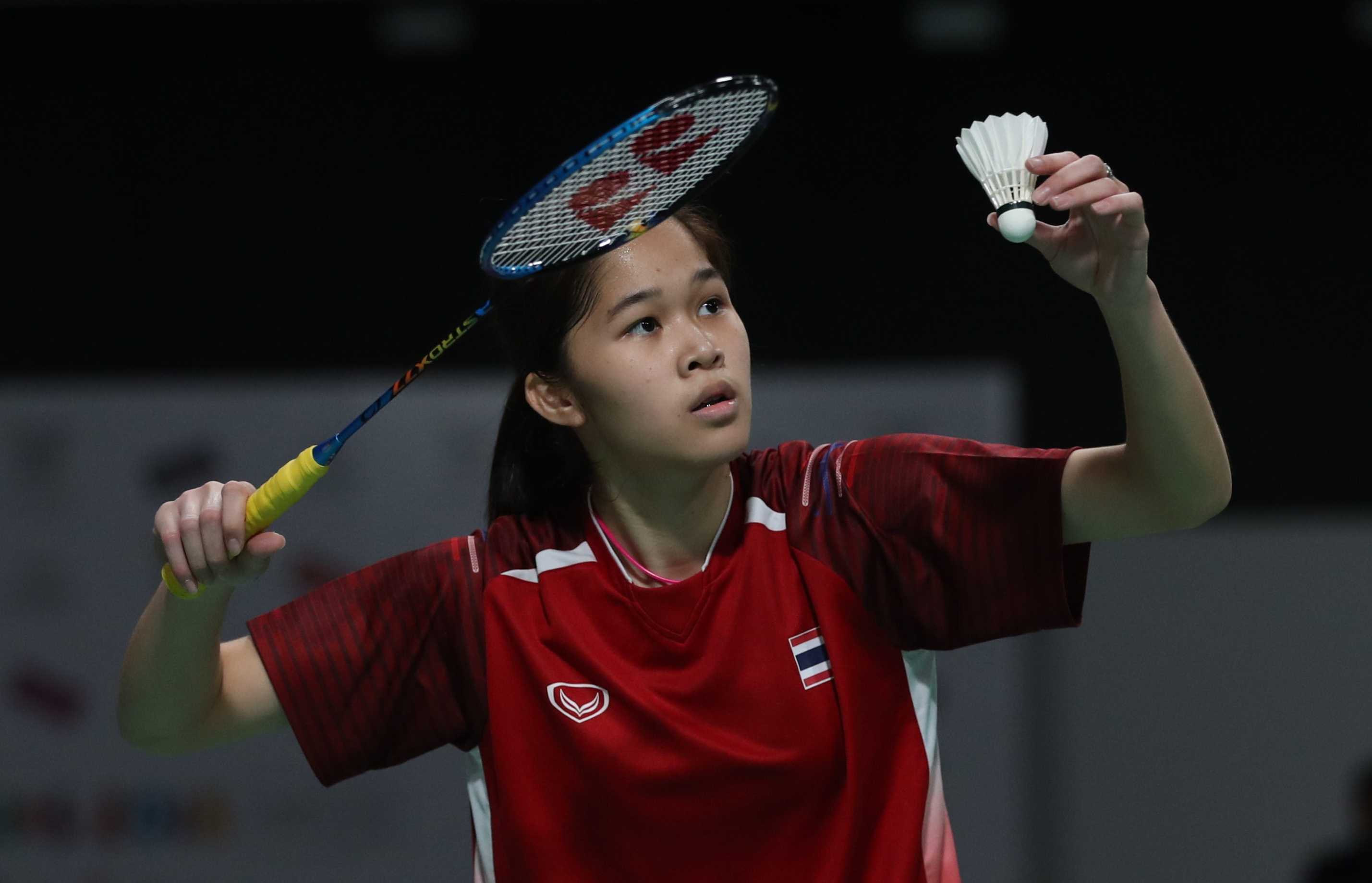
Phittayaporn Chaiwan

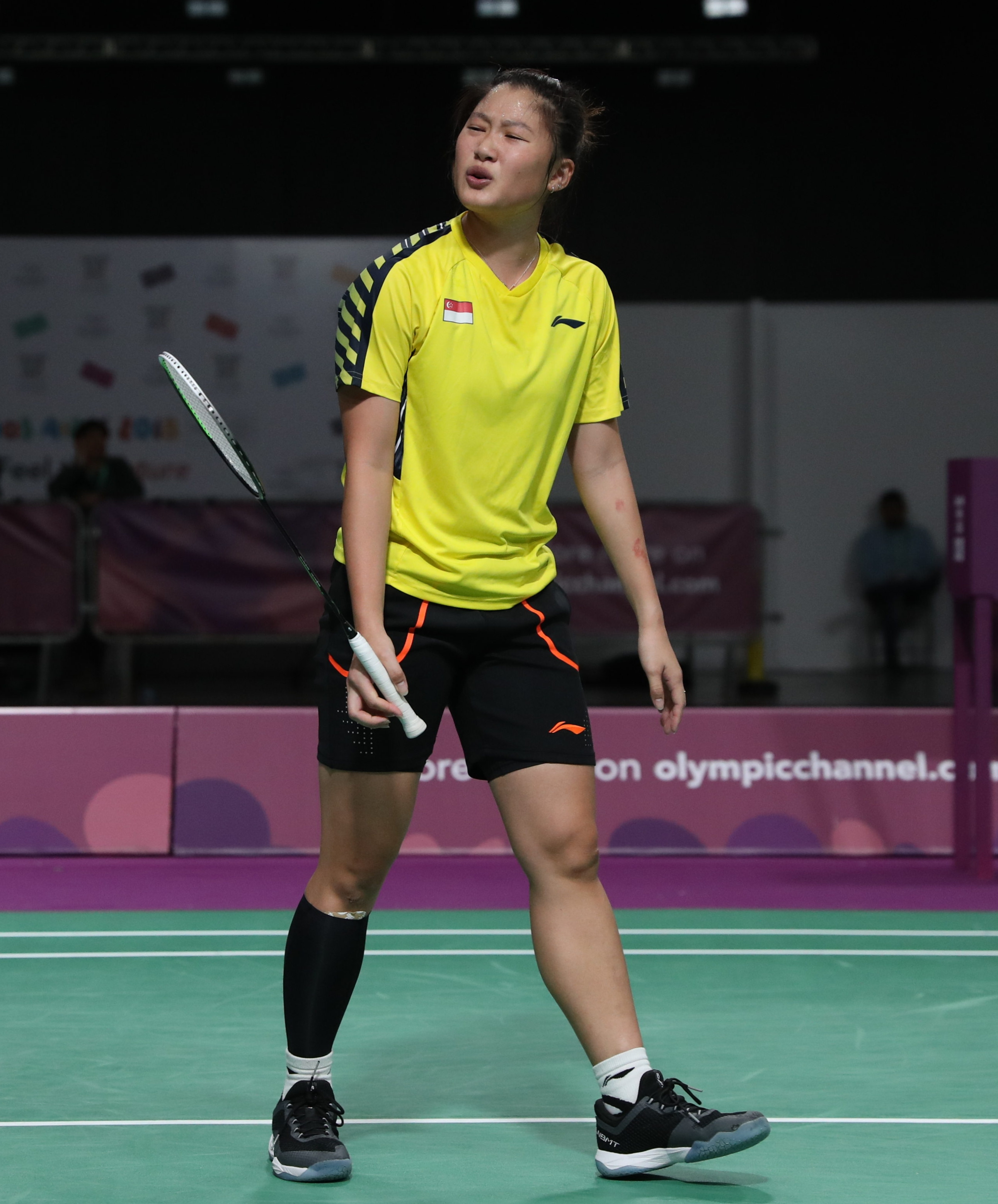
Jaslyn Hooi

== Results ==
=== Group stage ===
Key to colours in group tables
Player advancing to knockout stage

==== Group A ====
Athlete	Matches			Sets			Points		
Athlete	W	L	Tot	W	L	Diff	W	L	Diff
Phittayaporn Chaiwan (THA)	3	0	3	6	0	+6	126	36	+90
Hasini Ambalangodage (SRI)	2	1	3	4	2	+2	101	89	+12
Nairoby Abigail Jiménez (DOM)	1	2	3	2	4	-2	86	110	-24
Aminat Oluwafunke Ilori (NGR)	0	3	3	0	6	-6	48	126	-78

Sunday, 7 October
15:15
Nairoby Abigail Jiménez (DOM)	0–2	Hasini Ambalangodage (SRI)	14–21, 16–21	22 min	Court 1
15:15
Phittayaporn Chaiwan (THA)	2–0	Aminat Oluwafunke Ilori (NGR)	21–1, 21–4	16 min	Court 3
Monday, 8 October
14:05
Nairoby Abigail Jiménez (DOM)	2–0	Aminat Oluwafunke Ilori (NGR)	21–17, 21–9	22 min	Court 1
14:05
Phittayaporn Chaiwan (THA)	2–0	Hasini Ambalangodage (SRI)	21–5, 21–12	21 min	Court 3
Tuesday, 9 October
13:30
Hasini Ambalangodage (SRI)	2–0	Aminat Oluwafunke Ilori (NGR)	21–8, 21–9	19 min	Court 1
14:40
Phittayaporn Chaiwan (THA)	2–0	Nairoby Abigail Jiménez (DOM)	21–9, 21–5	19 min	Court 3

==== Group B ====
Athlete	Matches			Sets			Points		
Athlete	W	L	Tot	W	L	Diff	W	L	Diff
Vivien Sándorházi (HUN)	2	0	2	4	0	+4	86	69	+17
Vlada Gynga (MDA)	1	1	2	2	3	-1	90	86	+4
Petra Polanc (SLO)	0	2	2	1	4	-3	84	105	-21

Sunday, 7 October
14:40
Petra Polanc (SLO)	1–2	Vlada Gynga (MDA)	13–21, 21–19, 10–21	52 min	Court 2
Monday, 8 October
13:30
Vivien Sándorházi (HUN)	2–0	Vlada Gynga (MDA)	21–13, 21–16	31 min	Court 2
Tuesday, 9 October
14:05
Vivien Sándorházi (HUN)	2–0	Petra Polanc (SLO)	22–20, 22–20	38 min	Court 2

==== Group C ====
Athlete	Matches			Sets			Points		
Athlete	W	L	Tot	W	L	Diff	W	L	Diff
Goh Jin Wei (MAS)	3	0	3	6	1	+5	144	90	+54
Maharani Sekar Batari (INA)	2	1	3	4	3	+1	124	109	+15
Ann-Kathrin Spöri (GER)	1	2	3	3	5	-2	121	145	-24
Ashwathi Pillai (SWE)	0	3	3	2	6	-4	114	159	-45

Sunday, 7 October
14:05
Goh Jin Wei (MAS)	2–0	Maharani Sekar Batari (INA)	21–11, 21–15	31 min	Court 1
14:05
Ann-Kathrin Spöri (GER)	2–1	Ashwathi Pillai (SWE)	19–21, 21–9, 21–13	48 min	Court 3
Monday, 8 October
15:15
Ann-Kathrin Spöri (GER)	0–2	Maharani Sekar Batari (INA)	14–21, 9–21	31 min	Court 1
15:50
Goh Jin Wei (MAS)	2–0	Ashwathi Pillai (SWE)	21–15, 21–12	28 min	Court 2
Tuesday, 9 October
14:40
Ashwathi Pillai (SWE)	1–2	Maharani Sekar Batari (INA)	10–21, 21–14, 13–21	44 min	Court 1
15:50
Goh Jin Wei (MAS)	2–1	Ann-Kathrin Spöri (GER)	21–7, 18–21, 21–9	40 min	Court 3

==== Group D ====
Athlete	Matches			Sets			Points		
Athlete	W	L	Tot	W	L	Diff	W	L	Diff
Vũ Thị Anh Thư (VIE)	3	0	3	6	0	+6	126	67	+59
Maria Delcheva (BUL)	2	1	3	4	2	+2	114	85	+29
Anastasiya Prozorova (UKR)	1	2	3	2	4	-2	98	94	+4
Madeleine Caren Akoumba Ze (CMR)	0	3	3	0	6	-6	34	126	-92

Sunday, 7 October
13:30
Maria Delcheva (BUL)	2–0	Madeleine Caren Akoumba Ze (CMR)	21–5, 21–9	20 min	Court 2
15:50
Vũ Thị Anh Thư (VIE)	2–0	Anastasiya Prozorova (UKR)	21–8, 21–19	26 min	Court 2
Monday, 8 October
14:40
Maria Delcheva (BUL)	2–0	Anastasiya Prozorova (UKR)	21–13, 21–16	25 min	Court 2
15:15
Vũ Thị Anh Thư (VIE)	2–0	Madeleine Caren Akoumba Ze (CMR)	21–6, 21–4	19 min	Court 3
Tuesday, 9 October
13:30
Anastasiya Prozorova (UKR)	2–0	Madeleine Caren Akoumba Ze (CMR)	21–4, 21–6	18 min	Court 3
15:15
Maria Delcheva (BUL)	0–2	Vũ Thị Anh Thư (VIE)	18–21, 12–21	30 min	Court 2

==== Group E ====
Athlete	Matches			Sets			Points		
Athlete	W	L	Tot	W	L	Diff	W	L	Diff
Jaslyn Hooi (SGP)	2	1	3	5	2	+3	144	103	+41
Tereza Švábíková (CZE)	2	1	3	4	3	+1	120	122	-2
Grace King (GBR)	2	1	3	4	4	0	132	156	-24
Nazlıcan İnci (TUR)	0	3	3	2	6	-4	140	155	-15

Sunday, 7 October
9:00
Tereza Švábíková (CZE)	0–2	Jaslyn Hooi (SGP)	10–21, 14–21	26 min	Court 3
9:35
Grace King (GBR)	2–1	Nazlıcan İnci (TUR)	21–17, 17–21, 21–16	57 min	Court 1
Monday, 8 October
9:35
Grace King (GBR)	2–1	Jaslyn Hooi (SGP)	21–17, 6–21, 24–22	56 min	Court 1
10:10
Tereza Švábíková (CZE)	2–1	Nazlıcan İnci (TUR)	21–19, 12–21, 21–18	55 min	Court 2
Tuesday, 9 October
9:35
Nazlıcan İnci (TUR)	0–2	Jaslyn Hooi (SGP)	16–21, 12–21	37 min	Court 1
9:35
Tereza Švábíková (CZE)	2–0	Grace King (GBR)	21–13, 21—9	26 min	Court 3

==== Group F ====
Athlete	Matches			Sets			Points		
Athlete	W	L	Tot	W	L	Diff	W	L	Diff
Jennie Gai (USA)	3	0	3	6	0	+6	129	86	+43
Jakka Vaishnavi Reddy (IND)	2	1	3	4	2	+2	123	85	+38
Elena Andreu (ESP)	1	2	3	2	4	-2	91	115	-24
Fernanda Saponara Rivva (PER)	0	3	3	0	6	-6	69	126	-57

Sunday, 7 October
10:10
Fernanda Saponara Rivva (PER)	0–2	Jennie Gai (USA)	10–21, 7–21	21 min	Court 2
11:55
Jakka Vaishnavi Reddy (IND)	2–0	Elena Andreu (ESP)	21–13, 21–6	25 min	Court 1
Monday, 8 October
9:00
Jakka Vaishnavi Reddy (IND)	0–2	Jennie Gai (USA)	18–21, 21–23	32 min	Court 2
10:45
Fernanda Saponara Rivva (PER)	0–2	Elena Andreu (ESP)	17–21, 13–21	26 min	Court 3
Tuesday, 9 October
9:00
Jakka Vaishnavi Reddy (IND)	2–0	Fernanda Saponara Rivva (PER)	21–14, 21–8	22 min	Court 2
10:45
Jennie Gai (USA)	2–0	Elena Andreu (ESP)	21–10, 22–20	27 min	Court 3

==== Group G ====
Athlete	Matches			Sets			Points		
Athlete	W	L	Tot	W	L	Diff	W	L	Diff
Huang Yin-hsuan (TPE)	3	0	3	6	0	+6	126	81	+45
Jaqueline Lima (BRA)	2	1	3	4	3	+1	123	126	-3
Zecily Fung (AUS)	1	2	3	3	4	-1	116	139	-23
Madouc Linders (NED)	0	3	3	0	6	-6	109	128	-19

Sunday, 7 October
10:45
Huang Yin-hsuan (TPE)	2–0	Zecily Fung (AUS)	21–12, 21–11	23 min	Court 1
11:20
Jaqueline Lima (BRA)	2–0	Madouc Linders (NED)	21–16, 21–19	29 min	Court 3
Monday, 8 October
10:45
Huang Yin-hsuan (TPE)	2–0	Madouc Linders (NED)	21–19, 21–15	28 min	Court 1
11:20
Jaqueline Lima (BRA)	2–1	Zecily Fung (AUS)	21–11, 15–21, 21–17	38 min	Court 2
Tuesday, 9 October
10:10
Madouc Linders (NED)	0–2	Zecily Fung (AUS)	21–23, 19–21	30 min	Court 2
10:45
Huang Yin-hsuan (TPE)	2–0	Jaqueline Lima (BRA)	21–9, 21–15	23 min	Court 1

==== Group H ====
Athlete	Matches			Sets			Points		
Athlete	W	L	Tot	W	L	Diff	W	L	Diff
Wang Zhiyi (CHN)	3	0	3	6	1	+5	143	93	+50
Hirari Mizui (JPN)	2	1	3	5	2	+3	131	99	+32
Léonice Huet (FRA)	1	2	3	2	4	-2	98	109	-11
Halla Bouksani (ALG)	0	3	3	0	6	-6	55	126	-71

Sunday, 7 October
9:00
Hirari Mizui (JPN)	2–0	Léonice Huet (FRA)	21–14, 21–16	33 min	Court 2
10:10
Wang Zhiyi (CHN)	2–0	Halla Bouksani (ALG)	21–10, 21–10	22 min	Court 3
Monday, 8 October
9:35
Wang Zhiyi (CHN)	2–0	Léonice Huet (FRA)	21–10, 21–16	29 min	Court 3
11:55
Hirari Mizui (JPN)	2–0	Halla Bouksani (ALG)	21–1, 21–9	17 min	Court 1
Tuesday, 9 October
11:20
Wang Zhiyi (CHN)	2–1	Hirari Mizui (JPN)	21–10, 17–21, 21–16	77 min	Court 2
11:55
Léonice Huet (FRA)	2–0	Halla Bouksani (ALG)	21–15, 21–10	25 min	Court 1

== Knockout stage ==
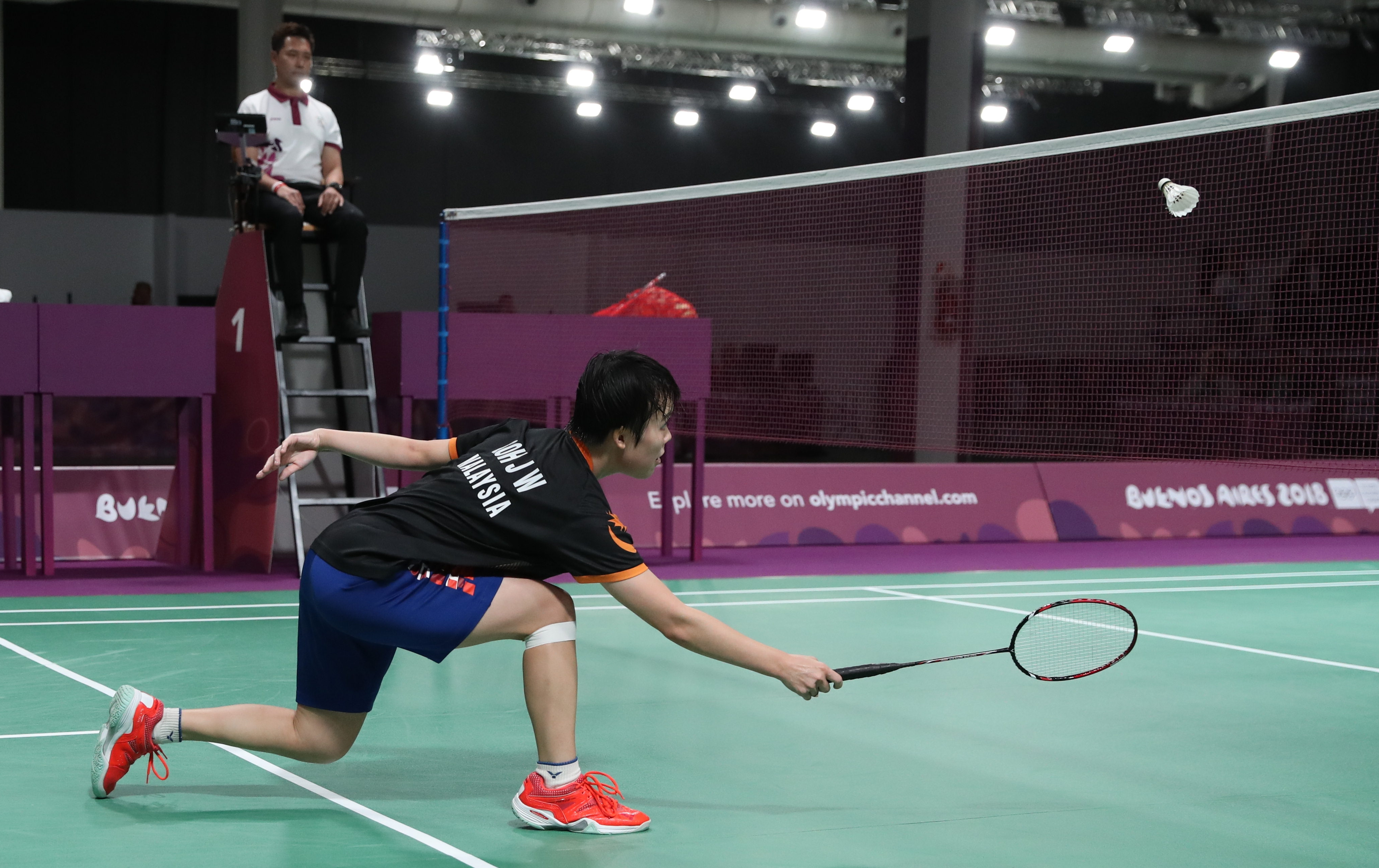
Goh Jin Wei (Youth Olympic Games Champion) during the Final

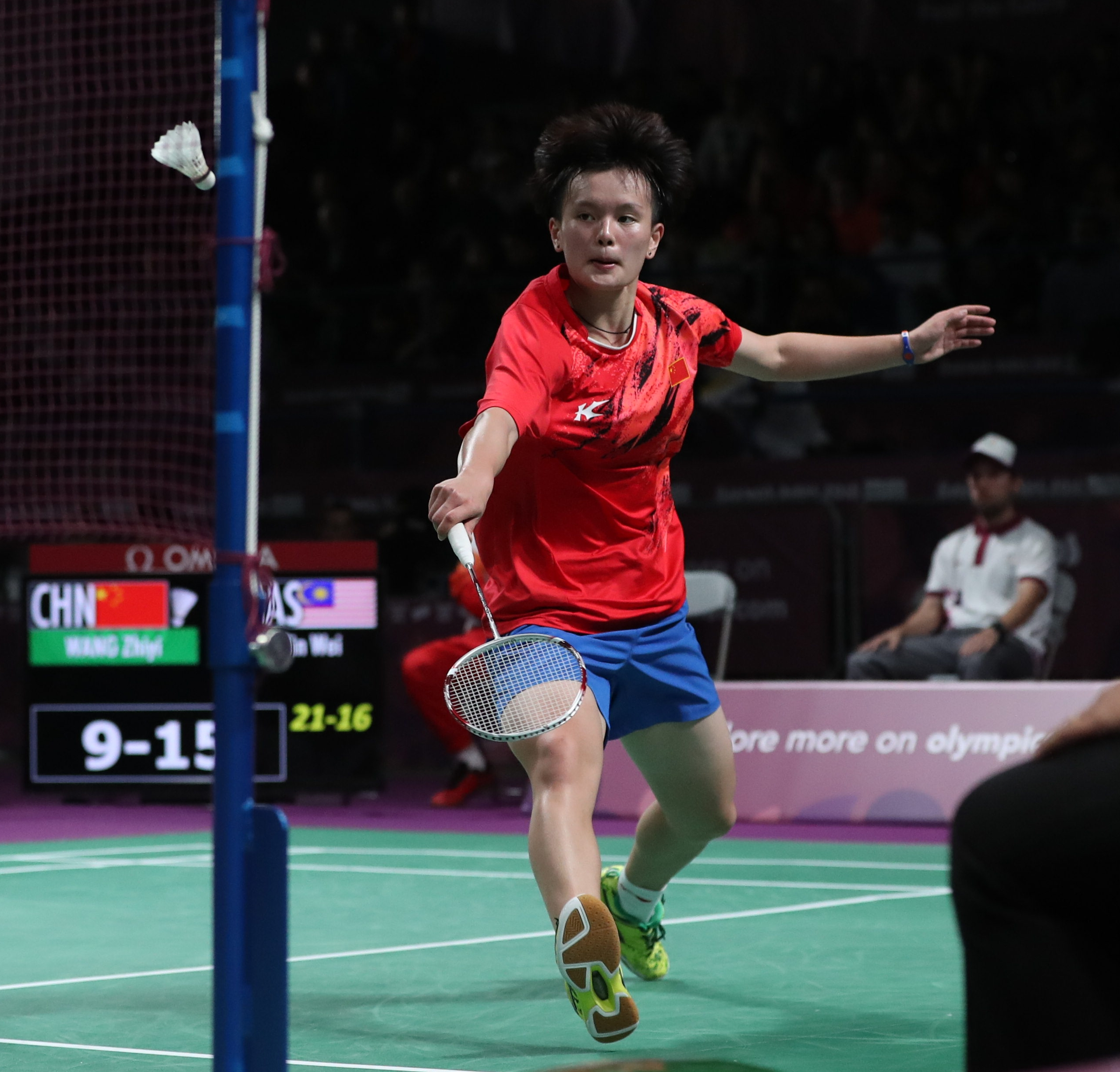
Wang Zhiyi during the Final

Quarterfinals; Wednesday, 10 October
1	Phittayaporn Chaiwan (THA)	21	21
7	Vivien Sándorházi (HUN)	9	8
3	Goh Jin Wei (MAS)	21	21
Vũ Thị Anh Thư (VIE)	12	9
Jaslyn Hooi (SGP)	21	21
Jennie Gai (USA)	16	18
6	Huang Yin-hsuan (TPE)	15	14
2	Wang Zhiyi (CHN)	21	21

Semifinals; Thursday, 11 October
1	Phittayaporn Chaiwan (THA)	21	15	13
3	Goh Jin Wei (MAS)	19	21	21
Jaslyn Hooi (SGP)	11	10
2	Wang Zhiyi (CHN)	21	21

Final; Friday, 12 October
3	Goh Jin Wei (MAS)	16	21	21
2	Wang Zhiyi (CHN)	21	13	19
Third place
1	Phittayaporn Chaiwan (THA)	21	21
Jaslyn Hooi (SGP)	9	13
