= Vietnam at the 2018 Summer Youth Olympics =

- IOC code: VIE
- NOC: Vietnam Olympic Committee
- Website: http://www.voc.org.vn/

in Buenos Aires, Argentina 6 – 18 October 2018
- Competitors: 13 in 7 sports
- Medals Ranked 38th: Gold 2 Silver 1 Bronze 0 Total 3

Summer Youth Olympics appearances
- 2010; 2014; 2018

Vietnam participated at the 2018 Summer Youth Olympics in Buenos Aires, Argentina from 6 October to 18 October 2018.

== Competitors ==
Sport	Boy(s)	Girl(s)	Total
Athletics	1	1	2
Badminton	1	1	2
Dancesport	1	N/A	1
Gymnastics	1	1	2
Swimming	2	1	3
Taekwondo	N/A	1	1
Weightlifting	1	1	2
Total	7	6	13

== Medalists ==
Medal	Name	Sport	Event	Date
Gold	Ngô Sơn Đỉnh	Weightlifting	Boys' 56 kg	7 October
Gold	Nguyễn Huy Hoàng	Swimming	Boys' 800 metre freestyle	11 October
Silver	Nguyễn Thị Thu Trang	Weightlifting	Girls' 44 kg	7 October

== Athletics ==
Lê Tiến Long and Đoàn Thu Hằng qualified.

Boys

Athlete	Event	Stage 1		Stage 2		Total	
Athlete	Event	Result	Rank	Result	Rank	Total	Rank
Lê Tiến Long	Boys' 2000 m steeplechase	5:51.79	10	12:44	38	18:35.79	10

Girls

Athlete	Event	Stage 1		Stage 2		Total	
Athlete	Event	Result	Rank	Result	Rank	Total	Rank
Đoàn Thu Hằng	Girls' 1500 m	4:41.17	13	14:02	24	18:43.17	10

== Badminton ==
Vietnam qualified two players based on the Badminton Junior World Rankings.

Singles

Athlete	Event	Group stage				Quarterfinal	Semifinal	Final / BM	Rank
Athlete	Event	Opposition Score	Opposition Score	Opposition Score	Rank	Opposition Score	Opposition Score	Opposition Score	Rank
Nguyễn Hải Đăng	Boys' Singles	Rumbay (INA); L (7–21, 9–21)	Koppen (NED); W (23–21, 21–17)	Medel (CHI); W (21–7, 21–7)	2	did not advance			9
Vũ Thị Anh Thư	Girls' Singles	Prozorova (UKR); W (21–8, 21–19)	Akoumba Ze (CMR); W (21–6, 21–4)	Delcheva (BUL); W (21–18, 21–12)	1Q	Goh (MAS); L (12–21, 9–21)	did not advance		5

Team

Athlete	Event	Group stage				Quarterfinal	Semifinal	Final / BM	Rank
Athlete	Event	Opposition Score	Opposition Score	Opposition Score	Rank	Opposition Score	Opposition Score	Opposition Score	Rank
Team Epsilon; Nguyễn Hải Đăng (VIE); Chen Shiau-cheng (TPE); Fabricio Farias (BRA); Tomás Toledano (ESP); Goh Jin Wei (MAS); Vlada Gînga (MDA); Aminat Oluwafunke Ilori (NGR); Nazlıcan İnci (TUR)	Mixed Teams	Alpha (MIX); L (98–110)	Zeta (MIX); L (89–110)	Delta (MIX); W (110–108)	4Q	Omega (MIX); L (102–110)	did not advance		5
Team Omega; Vũ Thị Anh Thư (VIE); Markus Barth (NOR); Oscar Guo (NZL); Chang Ho Kim (FIJ); Kunlavut Vitidsarn (THA); Huang Yin-hsuan (TPE); Léonice Huet (FRA); Anastasiya Prozorova (UKR)	Mixed Teams	Gamma (MIX); W (110–99)	Theta (MIX); W (110–100)	Sigma (MIX); W (110–98)	1Q	Epsilon (MIX); W (110–102)	Zeta (MIX); W (110–109)	Alpha (MIX); L (106–110)	2nd place, silver medalist(s)

== Boxing ==
Vietnam qualified one boxer based on its performance at the 2017 Youth Women's World Boxing Championships.

Đỗ Hồng Ngọc was disqualified.

== Dancesport ==
Vietnam qualified one dancer based on its performance at the 2018 World Youth Breaking Championship.

- B-Boys - B4 (Lê Minh Hiếu)

== Gymnastics ==
=== Artistic ===
Nguyễn Văn Khánh Phong and Phạm Như Phương qualified on their performance at the 2018 Junior Artistic Asian Championships, Indonesia.

- Boys' artistic individual all-around - Nguyễn Văn Khánh Phong
- Girls' artistic individual all-around - Phạm Như Phương

== Swimming ==
(gold) Nguyễn Huy Hoàng, Phạm Thành Bảo and Vũ Thị Phương Anh qualified.

== Taekwondo ==
Girl

Athlete	Event	Round of 16	Quarterfinals	Semifinals	Final	Rank
Athlete	Event	Opposition Result	Opposition Result	Opposition Result	Opposition Result	Rank
Hồ Thị Kim Ngân	Girls' 49 kg	Yangchen Tshering (BHU); W 22-0	Elizaveta Ryadninskaya (RUS); L 5-6	did not advance		

== Weightlifting ==
Main article: Weightlifting at the 2018 Summer Youth Olympics

Vietnam qualified one athlete (girl) based on its performance at the 2017 Youth World Weightlifting Championships.

Boy

Athlete	Event	Snatch		Clean & Jerk		Total	Rank
Athlete	Event	Result	Rank	Result	Rank	Total	Rank
Ngô Sơn Đỉnh	−56 kg	114	1	148	1	262	1st place, gold medalist(s)

Girls

Athlete	Event	Snatch		Clean & jerk		Total	Rank
Athlete	Event	Result	Rank	Result	Rank	Total	Rank
Nguyễn Thị Thu Trang	−44 kg	72	1	75	3	147	2nd place, silver medalist(s)
