= Badminton at the 2018 Summer Youth Olympics – Mixed team relay =

Mixed teams at the III Summer Youth Olympic Games
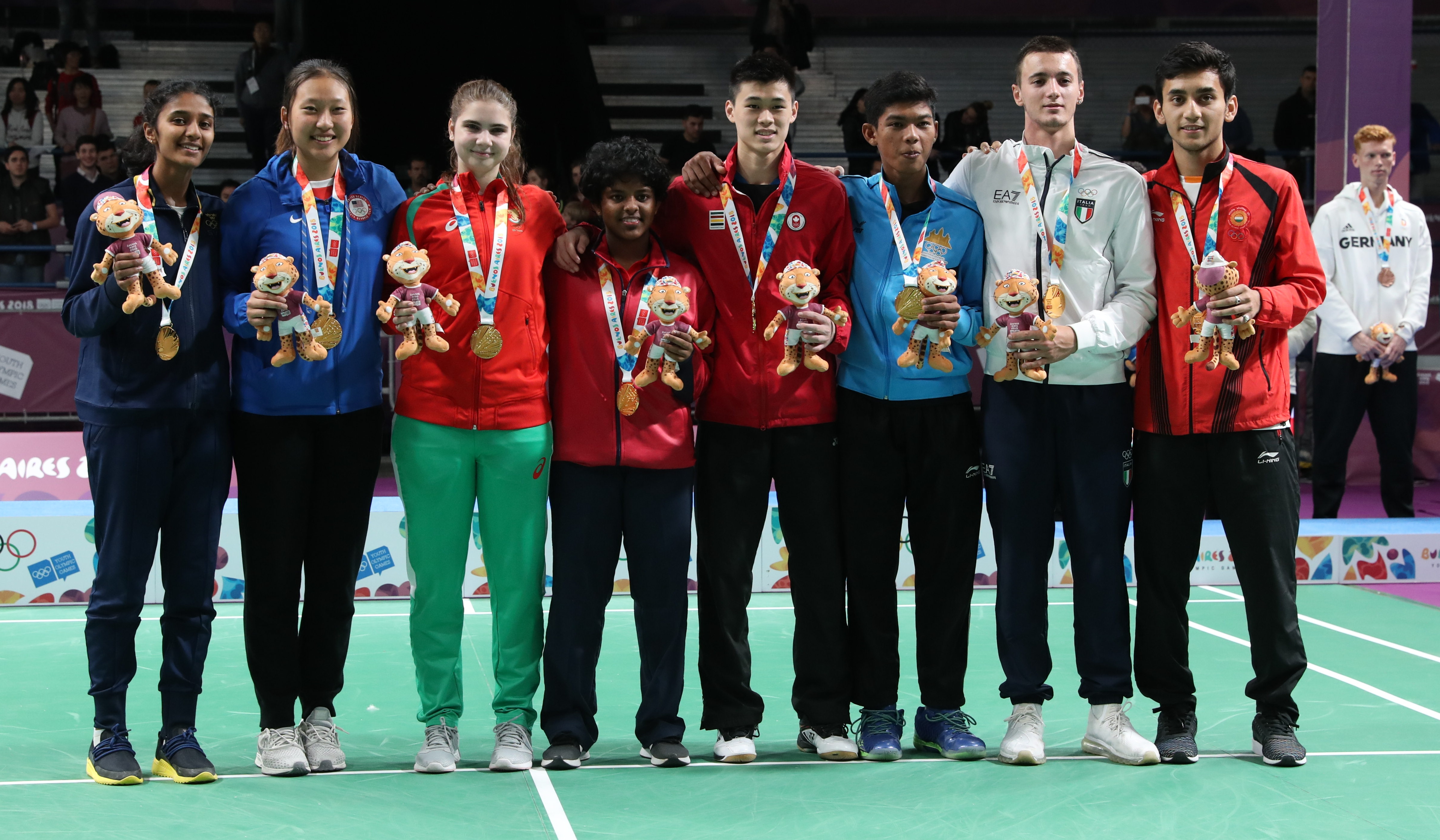
- The gold medailists
- Venue: Tecnópolis
- Dates: 7–12 October
- Competitors: 63 from 46 nations

Medalists
1st place, gold medalist(s)		Lakshya Sen; Giovanni Toti; Vannthoun Vath; Brian Yang; Hasini Ambalangodage; Maria Delcheva; Jennie Gai; Ashwathi Pillai	Mixed-NOCs
2nd place, silver medalist(s)		Markus Barth; Oscar Guo; Chang Ho Kim; Kunlavut Vitidsarn; Huang Yin-hsuan; Léonice Huet; Anastasiya Prozorova; Vũ Thị Anh Thư	Mixed-NOCs
3rd place, bronze medalist(s)		Julien Carraggi; Mohamed Mostafa Kamel; Kodai Naraoka; Lukas Resch; Zecily Fung; Jaqueline Lima; Hirari Mizui; Tereza Švábíková	Mixed-NOCs

These are the results for the mixed teams event at the 2018 Summer Youth Olympics.

== Groups ==
Alpha	Gamma	Delta	Epsilon
Lakshya Sen (IND); Giovanni Toti (ITA); Vannthoun Vath (CAM); Brian Yang (CAN); Hasini Ambalangodage (SRI); Maria Delcheva (BUL); Jennie Gai (USA); Ashwathi Pillai (SWE)	Uriel Canjura (ESA); Joel Koh (SGP); Li Shifeng (CHN); Alonso Medel (CHI); Halla Bouksani (ALG); Fernanda Saponara Rivva (PER); Jakka Vaishnavi Reddy (IND)	Mateo Delmastro (ARG); Arnaud Merklé (FRA); Dmitriy Panarin (KAZ); Balázs Pápai (HUN); Elena Andreu (ESP); Phittayaporn Chaiwan (THA); Madouc Linders (NED); Petra Polanc (SLO)	Chen Shiau-cheng (TPE); Fabricio Farias (BRA); Nguyễn Hải Đăng (VIE); Tomás Toledano (ESP); Goh Jin Wei (MAS); Vlada Gynga (MDA); Aminat Oluwafunke Ilori (NGR); Nazlıcan İnci (TUR)
Zeta	Theta	Sigma	Omega
Danylo Bosniuk (UKR); Christopher Grimley (GBR); Kettiya Keoxay (LAO); Nhat Nguyen (IRL); Maharani Sekar Batari (INA); Jaslyn Hooi (SGP); Nairoby Abigail Jiménez (DOM); Vivien Sándorházi (HUN)	Julien Carraggi (BEL); Mohamed Mostafa Kamel (EGY); Kodai Naraoka (JPN); Lukas Resch (GER); Zecily Fung (AUS); Jaqueline Lima (BRA); Hirari Mizui (JPN); Tereza Švábíková (CZE)	Dennis Koppen (NED); Rukesh Maharjan (NEP); Ikhsan Rumbay (INA); Cristian Savin (MDA); Madeleine Caren Akoumba Ze (CMR); Grace King (GBR); Ann-Kathrin Spöri (GER); Wang Zhiyi (CHN)	Markus Barth (NOR); Oscar Guo (NZL); Chang Ho Kim (FIJ); Kunlavut Vitidsarn (THA); Huang Yin-hsuan (TPE); Léonice Huet (FRA); Anastasiya Prozorova (UKR); Vũ Thị Anh Thư (VIE)

== Results ==
=== Group A ===
Athlete	Matches			Points		
Athlete	W	L	Tot	W	L	Diff
Delta	2	1	3	328	304	+24
Alpha	2	1	3	319	311	+8
Zeta	1	2	3	305	309	-1
Epsilon	1	2	3	297	328	-31

Epsilon vs. Alpha

Sunday, 7 October, 18:00 UTC−3 Tecnópolis, Court 1
Epsilon vs. Alpha
#	Category	Epsilon	Score (Partition score)	Alpha
1	XD	Tomás Toledano (Spain); Vlada Ginga (Moldova)	11–5 (11–5)	(Cambodia) Vannthoun Vath (Bulgaria) Maria Delcheva
2	WS	Goh Jin Wei (Malaysia)	22–9 (11–4)	(Sri Lanka) Hasini Ambalangodage
3	WD	Vlada Ginga (Moldova); Goh Jin Wei (Malaysia)	33–18 (11–9)	(Bulgaria) Maria Delcheva (Sweden) Ashwathi Pillai
4	MS	Chen Shiau-cheng (Chinese Taipei)	43–44 (10–26)	(India) Lakshya Sen
5	MD	Chen Shiau-cheng (Chinese Taipei); Fabrício Farias (Brazil)	52–55 (9–11)	(India) Lakshya Sen (Italy) Giovanni Toti
6	XD	Fabrício Farias (Brazil); Aminat Ilori (Nigeria)	59–66 (7–11)	(Italy) Giovanni Toti (Sweden) Ashwathi Pillai
7	WS	Nazlıcan İnci (Turkey)	65–77 (6–11)	(United States) Jennie Gai
8	WD	Aminat Ilori (Nigeria); Nazlıcan İnci (Turkey)	73–88 (8–11)	(Sri Lanka) Hasini Ambalangodage (United States) Jennie Gai
9	MS	Nguyễn Hải Đăng (Vietnam)	85–99 (12–11)	(Canada) Brian Yang
10	MD	Nguyễn Hải Đăng (Vietnam); Tomás Toledano (Spain)	98–110 (13–11)	(Cambodia) Vannthoun Vath (Canada) Brian Yang
Result

Delta vs. Zeta

Sunday, 7 October, 18:00 UTC−3 Tecnópolis, Court 1
Epsilon vs. Alpha
#	Category	Delta	Score (Partition score)	Zeta
1	MD	Mateo Delmastro (Argentina); Balázs Pápai (Hungary)	3–11 (3–11)	(United Kingdom) Christopher Grimley (Republic of Ireland) Nhat Nguyen
2	WS	Elena Andreu (Spain)	19–22 (16–11)	(Dominican Republic) Nairoby Abigail Jiménez
3	WD	Madouc Linders (Netherlands); Petra Polanc (Slovenia)	33–31 (14–9)	(Indonesia) Maharani Sekar Batari (Indonesia) Jaslyn Hooi
4	MS	Arnaud Merklé (France)	44–43 (11–12)	(Ukraine) Danylo Bosniuk
5	XD	Balázs Pápai (Hungary); Petra Polanc (Slovenia)	54–55 (10–12)	(United Kingdom) Christopher Grimley (Singapore) Jaslyn Hooi
6	MD	Mateo Delmastro (Argentina); Dmitriy Panarin (Kazakhstan)	64–66 (10–11)	(Ukraine) Danylo Bosniuk (Laos) Kettiya Keoxay
7	WS	Phittayaporn Chaiwan (Thailand)	77–67 (13–1)	(Indonesia) Maharani Sekar Batari
8	WD	Elena Andreu (Spain); Madouc Linders (Netherlands)	88–72 (11–5)	(Dominican Republic) Nairoby Abigail Jiménez (Hungary) Vivien Sándorházi
9	MS	Dmitriy Panarin (Kazakhstan)	99–81 (11–9)	(Laos) Kettiya Keoxay
10	XD	Arnaud Merklé (France); Phittayaporn Chaiwan (Thailand)	110–95 (11–14)	(Republic of Ireland) Nhat Nguyen (Republic of Ireland) Vivien Sándorházi
Result

Delta vs. Alpha

Sunday, 8 October, 18:00 UTC−3 Tecnópolis, Court 1
Delta vs. Alpha
#	Category	Delta	Score (Partition score)	Alpha
1	MD	Mateo Delmastro (Argentina); Balázs Pápai (Hungary)	5–11 (5–11)	(Cambodia) Vannthoun Vath (Canada) Brian Yang
2	WS	Phittayaporn Chaiwan (Thailand)	22–17 (17–6)	(United States) Jennie Gai
3	MS	Dmitriy Panarin (Kazakhstan)	33–28 (11–11)	(India) Lakshya Sen
4	XD	Dmitriy Panarin (Kazakhstan); Madouc Linders (Netherlands)	44–34 (11–6)	(Italy) Giovanni Toti (Bulgaria) Maria Delcheva
5	WD	Madouc Linders (Netherlands); Petra Polanc (Slovenia)	55–45 (11–11)	(Bulgaria) Maria Delcheva (Sweden) Ashwathi Pillai
6	MD	Mateo Delmastro (Argentina); Arnaud Merklé (France)	66–59 (11–14)	(Italy) Giovanni Toti (Cambodia) Vannthoun Vath
7	WS	Elena Andreu (Spain)	77–63 (11–4)	(Sri Lanka) Hasini Ambalangodage
8	MS	Balázs Pápai (Hungary)	88–77 (11–14)	(Canada) Brian Yang
9	XD	Arnaud Merklé (France); Petra Polanc (Slovenia)	99–90 (11–13)	(India) Lakshya Sen (Sweden) Ashwathi Pillai
10	WD	Elena Andreu (Spain); Phittayaporn Chaiwan (Thailand)	110–99 (11–9)	(Sri Lanka) Hasini Ambalangodage (United States) Jennie Gai
Result

Epsilon vs. Zeta

Sunday, 8 October, 19:30 UTC−3 Tecnópolis, Court 1
Epsilon vs. Zeta
#	Category	Epsilon	Score (Partition score)	Zeta
1	XD	Nazlıcan İnci (Turkey); Tomás Toledano (Spain)	11–1 (11–1)	(Dominican Republic) Nairoby Abigail Jiménez (Laos) Kettiya Keoxay
2	WS	Goh Jin Wei (Malaysia)	22–16 (11–15)	(Hungary) Vivien Sándorházi
3	WD	Goh Jin Wei (Malaysia); Nazlıcan İnci (Turkey)	33–17 (11–1)	(Indonesia) Maharani Sekar Batari (Dominican Republic) Nairoby Abigail Jiménez
4	MD	Chen Shiau-cheng (Chinese Taipei); Nguyễn Hải Đăng (Vietnam)	44–37 (11–20)	(Ukraine) Danylo Bosniuk (Republic of Ireland) Nhat Nguyen
5	MS	Fabrício Farias (Brazil)	55–45 (11–8)	(Ukraine) Danylo Bosniuk
6	XD	Chen Shiau-cheng (Chinese Taipei); Vlada Ginga (Moldova)	66–61 (11–16)	(Singapore) Jaslyn Hooi (Republic of Ireland) Nhat Nguyen
7	WS	Aminat Ilori (Nigeria)	67–77 (1–16)	(Indonesia) Maharani Sekar Batari
8	WD	Vlada Ginga (Moldova); Aminat Ilori (Nigeria)	76–88 (9–11)	(Singapore) Jaslyn Hooi (Hungary) Vivien Sándorházi
9	MD	Fabrício Farias (Brazil); Tomás Toledano (Spain)	82–99 (6–11)	(United Kingdom) Christopher Grimley (Laos) Kettiya Keoxay
10	MS	Nguyễn Hải Đăng (Vietnam)	89–110 (7–11)	(United Kingdom) Christopher Grimley
Result

Alpha vs. Zeta

Sunday, 9 October, 18:00 UTC−3 Tecnópolis, Court 1
Alpha vs. Zeta
#	Category	Alpha	Score (Partition score)	Zeta
1	WD	Hasini Ambalangodage (Sri Lanka); Maria Delcheva (Bulgaria)	11–4 (11–4)	(Singapore) Jaslyn Hooi (Dominican Republic) Nairoby Abigail Jiménez
2	MS	Brian Yang (Canada)	22–18 (11–14)	(Republic of Ireland) Nhat Nguyen
3	XD	Vannthoun Vath (Cambodia); Hasini Ambalangodage (Sri Lanka)	33–27 (11–9)	(Laos) Kettiya Keoxay (Dominican Republic) Nairoby Abigail Jiménez
4	WS	Maria Delcheva (Bulgaria)	40–44 (7–17)	(Hungary) Vivien Sándorházi
5	MD	Giovanni Toti (Italy); Vannthoun Vath (Cambodia)	52–55 (12–11)	(Ukraine) Danylo Bosniuk (Laos) Kettiya Keoxay
6	WD	Jennie Gai (United States); Ashwathi Pillai (Sweden)	66–63 (14–8)	(Singapore) Jaslyn Hooi (Hungary) Vivien Sándorházi
7	MS	Giovanni Toti (Italy)	72–77 (6–14)	(Ukraine) Danylo Bosniuk
8	XD	Lakshya Sen (India); Ashwathi Pillai (Sweden)	88–87 (16–10)	(United Kingdom) Christopher Grimley (Indonesia) Maharani Sekar Batari
9	WS	Jennie Gai (United States)	99–94 (11–7)	(Indonesia) Maharani Sekar Batari
10	MD	Lakshya Sen (India); Brian Yang (Canada)	110–103 (11–9)	(United Kingdom) Christopher Grimley (Republic of Ireland) Nhat Nguyen
Result

Delta vs. Epsilon

Sunday, 9 October, 19:30 UTC−3 Tecnópolis, Court 1
Delta vs. Epsilon
#	Category	Delta	Score (Partition score)	Epsilon
1	WS	Elena Andreu (Spain)	11–5 (11–5)	(Nigeria) Aminat Ilori
2	MD	Mateo Delmastro (Argentina); Arnaud Merklé (France)	16–22 (5–17)	(Chinese Taipei) Chen Shiau-cheng (Vietnam) Nguyễn Hải Đăng
3	WD	Phittayaporn Chaiwan (Thailand); Petra Polanc (Slovenia)	33–27 (17–5)	(Nigeria) Aminat Ilori (Turkey) Nazlıcan İnci
4	XD	Arnaud Merklé (France); Petra Polanc (Slovenia)	44–39 (11–12)	(Chinese Taipei) Chen Shiau-cheng (Turkey) Nazlıcan İnci
5	MS	Dmitriy Panarin (Kazakhstan)	54–55 (10–16)	(Brazil) Fabrício Farias
6	WS	Phittayaporn Chaiwan (Thailand)	66–57 (12–2)	(Moldova) Vlada Ginga
7	MD	Mateo Delmastro (Argentina); Balázs Pápai (Hungary)	77–76 (11–21)	(Brazil) Fabrício Farias (Spain) Tomás Toledano
8	WD	Elena Andreu (Spain); Madouc Linders (Netherlands)	88–83 (11–7)	(Moldova) Vlada Ginga (Malaysia) Goh Jin Wei
9	XD	Dmitriy Panarin (Kazakhstan); Madouc Linders (Netherlands)	99–93 (11–10)	(Vietnam) Nguyễn Hải Đăng (Malaysia) Goh Jin Wei
10	MS	Balázs Pápai (Hungary)	108–110 (9–17)	(Spain) Tomas Tolendano
Result

=== Group B ===
Athlete	Matches			Points		
Athlete	W	L	Tot	W	L	Diff
Omega	3	0	3	330	297	+33
Sigma	2	1	3	318	296	+22
Gamma	1	2	3	295	327	-32
Theta	0	3	3	307	330	-23

Omega vs. Gamma

Sunday, 7 October, 18:00 UTC−3 Tecnópolis, Court 3
Omega vs. Gamma
#	Category	Omega	Score (Partition score)	Gamma
1	MS	Kunlavut Vitidsarn (Thailand)	9–11 (9–11)	(China) Li Shifeng
2	MD	Markus Barth (Norway); Chang Ho Kim (Fiji)	14–22 (5–11)	(El Salvador) Uriel Canjura (Chile) Alonso Medel
3	WD	Huang Yin-hsuan (Chinese Taipei); Vũ Thị Anh Thư (Vietnam)	21–33 (7–11)	(Peru) Fernanda Saponara (India) Vaishnavi Reddy Jakka
4	WS	Huang Yin-hsuan (Chinese Taipei)	32–44 (11–11)	(India) Vaishnavi Reddy Jakka
5	XD	Markus Barth (Norway); Vũ Thị Anh Thư (Vietnam)	39–55 (7–11)	(El Salvador) Uriel Canjura (India) Vaishnavi Reddy Jakka
6	MS	Oscar Guo (New Zealand)	53–66 (14–11)	(Singapore) Joel Koh
7	MD	Oscar Guo (New Zealand); Kunlavut Vitidsarn (Thailand)	67–77 (14–11)	(Singapore) Joel Koh (China) Li Shifeng
8	WD	Léonice Huet (France); Anastasiia Prozorova (Ukraine)	88–80 (21–3)	(Algeria) Halla Bouksani (Peru) Fernanda Saponara
9	WS	Léonice Huet (France)	99–86 (11–6)	(Algeria) Halla Bouksani
10	XD	Chang Ho Kim (Fiji); Anastasiia Prozorova (Ukraine)	110–99 (11–13)	(Chile) Alonso Medel (Peru) Fernanda Saponara
Result

Sigma vs. Theta

Sunday, 7 October, 19:30 UTC−3 Tecnópolis, Court 3
Sigma vs. Theta
#	Category	Sigma	Score (Partition score)	Theta
1	XD	Dennis Koppen (Netherlands); Ann-Kathrin Spöri (Germany)	11–5 (11–5)	(Australia) Zecily Fung (Egypt) Mohamed Mostafa Kamel
2	WS	Madeleine Akoumba Ze (Cameroon)	11–22 (0–17)	(Japan) Hirari Mizui
3	MS	Ikhsan Rumbay (Indonesia)	18–33 (7–11)	(Belgium) Julien Carraggi
4	MD	Dennis Koppen (Netherlands); Ikhsan Rumbay (Indonesia)	31–44 (13–11)	(Belgium) Julien Carraggi (Japan) Kodai Naraoka
5	WD	Madeleine Akoumba Ze (Cameroon); Grace King (United Kingdom)	40–55 (9–11)	(Japan) Hirari Mizui (Czech Republic) Tereza Švábíková
6	XD	Cristian Savin (Moldova); Grace King (United Kingdom)	56–66 (16–11)	(Japan) Kodai Naraoka (Brazil) Jaqueline Lima
7	WS	Wang Zhiyi (China)	73–77 (17–11)	(Czech Republic) Tereza Švábíková
8	MS	Dennis Koppen (Netherlands)	82–88 (9–11)	(Germany) Lukas Resch
9	MD	Ikhsan Rumbay (Indonesia); Cristian Savin (Moldova)	99–96 (17–8)	(Egypt) Mohamed Mostafa Kamel (Germany) Lukas Resch
10	WD	Ann-Kathrin Spöri (Germany); Wang Zhiyi (China)	110–100 (11–4)	(Australia) Zecily Fung (Brazil) Jaqueline Lima
Result

Sigma vs. Gamma

Sunday, 8 October, 18:00 UTC−3 Tecnópolis, Court 3
Sigma vs. Gamma
#	Category	Sigma	Score (Partition score)	Gamma
1	WS	Madeleine Akoumbe Ze (Cameroon)	3–11 (3–11)	(Algeria) Halla Bouksani
2	WD	Madeleine Akoumbe Ze (Cameroon); Ann-Kathrin Spöri (Germany)	14–22 (11–11)	(Algeria) Halla Bouksani (Peru) Fernanda Saponara
3	MS	Ikhsan Rumbay (Indonesia)	26–33 (12–11)	(China) Li Shifeng
4	MD	Dennis Koppen (Netherlands); Ikhsan Rumbay (Indonesia)	32–44 (7–11)	(Singapore) Joel Koh (China) Li Shifeng
5	XD	Cristian Savin (Moldova); Grace King (United Kingdom)	54–55 (22–11)	(Chile) Alonso Medel (Peru) Fernanda Saponara
6	WS	Wang Zhiyi (China)	66–60 (12–5)	(India) Vaishnavi Reddy Jakka
7	WD	Grace King (United Kingdom); Wang Zhiyi (China)	77–70 (11–10)	(Peru) Fernanda Saponara (India) Vaishnavi Reddy Jakka
8	MS	Cristian Savin (Moldova)	88–74 (11–4)	(Singapore) Joel Koh
9	MD	Dennis Koppen (Netherlands); Cristian Savin (Moldova)	99–80 (11–6)	(El Salvador) Uriel Canjura (Chile) Alonso Medel
10	XD	Dennis Koppen (Netherlands); Ann-Kathrin Spöri (Germany)	110–86 (11–6)	(El Salvador) Uriel Canjura (India) Vaishnavi Reddy Jakka
Result

Omega vs. Theta

Sunday, 8 October, 19:30 UTC−3 Tecnópolis, Court 3
Omega vs. Theta
#	Category	Omega	Score (Partition score)	Theta
1	MS	Chang Ho Kim (Fiji)	3–11 (3–11)	(Egypt) Mohamed Mostafa Kamel
2	WD	Huang Yin-hsuan (Chinese Taipei); Vũ Thị Anh Thư (Vietnam)	17–22 (14–11)	(Australia) Zecily Fung (Japan) Hirari Mizui
3	WS	Léonice Huet (France)	30–33 (13–11)	(Australia) Zecily Fung
4	MD	Markus Barth (Norway); Chang Ho Kim (Fiji)	40–44 (10–11)	(Egypt) Mohamed Mostafa Kamel (Germany) Lukas Resch
5	XD	Kunlavut Vitidsarn (Thailand); Anastasiia Prozorova (Ukraine)	55–53 (15–9)	(Japan) Kodai Naraoka (Brazil) Jaqueline Lima
6	MS	Markus Barth (Norway)	66–61 (11–8)	(Belgium) Julien Carraggi
7	WD	Léonice Huet (France); Anastasiia Prozorova (Ukraine)	76–77 (10–16)	(Brazil) Jaqueline Lima (Czech Republic) Tereza Švábíková
8	WS	Huang Yin-hsuan (Chinese Taipei)	88–85 (12–8)	(Japan) Hirari Mizui
9	MD	Oscar Guo (New Zealand); Kunlavut Vitidsarn (Thailand)	99–92 (11–7)	(Belgium) Julien Carraggi (Japan) Kodai Naraoka
10	XD	Oscar Guo (New Zealand); Vũ Thị Anh Thư (Vietnam)	110–100 (11–8)	(Germany) Lukas Resch (Czech Republic) Tereza Švábíková
Result

Omega vs. Sigma

Sunday, 9 October, 18:00 UTC−3 Tecnópolis, Court 3
Omega vs. Sigma
#	Category	Omega	Score (Partition score)	Sigma
1	MS	Chang Ho Kim (Fiji)	1–11 (1–11)	(Netherlands) Dennis Koppen
2	WS	Léonice Huet (France)	22–14 (21–3)	(Cameroon) Madeleine Akoumba Ze
3	WD	Huang Yin-hsuan (Chinese Taipei); Vũ Thị Anh Thư (Vietnam)	33–22 (11–8)	(Germany) Ann-Kathrin Spöri (China) Wang Zhiyi
4	XD	Oscar Guo (New Zealand); Vũ Thị Anh Thư (Vietnam)	44–28 (11–6)	(Netherlands) Dennis Koppen (Germany) Ann-Kathrin Spöri
5	MD	Markus Barth (Norway); Chang Ko Kim (Fiji)	54–55 (10–27)	(Indonesia) Ikhsan Rumbay (Moldova) Cristian Savin
6	MS	Markus Barth (Norway)	60–66 (6–11)	(Indonesia) Ikhsan Rumbay
7	WS	Huang Yin-hsuan (Chinese Taipei)	71–77 (11–11)	(China) Wang Zhiyi
8	WD	Léonice Huet (France); Anastasiia Prozorova (Ukraine)	88–84 (17–7)	(Cameroon) Madeleine Akoumba Ze (United Kingdom) Grace King
9	XD	Kunlavut Vitidsarn (Thailand); Anastasiia Prozorova (Ukraine)	99–87 (11–3)	(Netherlands) Dennis Koppen (United Kingdom) Grace King
10	MD	Oscar Guo (New Zealand); Kunlavut Vitidsarn (Thailand)	110–98 (11–11)	(Indonesia) Ikhsan Rumbay (Indonesia) Cristian Savin
Result

Theta vs. Gamma

Sunday, 9 October, 19:30 UTC−3 Tecnópolis, Court 3
Theta vs. Gamma
#	Category	Theta	Score (Partition score)	Gamma
1	WS	Jaqueline Lima (Brazil)	5–11 (5–11)	(Algeria) Halla Bouksani
2	WD	Jaqueline Lima (Brazil); Tereza Švábíková (Czech Republic)	22–20 (17–9)	(Algeria) Halla Bouksani (Peru) Fernanda Saponara
3	MD	Julien Carraggi (Belgium); Mohamed Mostafa Kamel (Egypt)	33–29 (11–9)	(El Salvador) Uriel Canjura (Chile) Alonso Medel
4	MS	Mohamed Mostafa Kamel (Egypt)	37–44 (4–15)	(El Salvador) Uriel Canjura
5	XD	Kodai Naraoka (Japan); Hirari Mizui (Japan)	52–55 (15–11)	(China) Li Shifeng (India) Vaishnavi Reddy Jakka
6	WS	Tereza Švábíková (Czech Republic)	60–66 (8–11)	(India) Vaishnavi Reddy Jakka
7	WD	Zecily Fung (Australia); Hirari Mizui (Japan)	68–77 (8–11)	(Peru) Fernanda Saponara (India) Vaishnavi Reddy Jakka
8	MD	Kodai Naraoka (Japan); Lukas Resch (Germany)	76–88 (8–11)	(Singapore) Joel Koh (China) Li Shifeng
9	MS	Julien Carraggi (Belgium)	97–99 (21–11)	(Chile) Alonso Medel
10	XD	Zecily Fung (Australia); Lukas Resch (Germany)	107–110 (10–11)	(Singapore) Joel Koh (Peru) Fernanda Saponara
Result

== Knockout stage ==
Quarter-finals; Wednesday, 10 October
A1	Delta	93
B4	Theta	110
A2	Alpha	110
B3	Gamma	94
A3	Zeta	110
B2	Sigma	106
A4	Epsilon	102
B1	Omega	110

Semi-finals; Thursday, 11 October
B4	Theta	90
A2	Alpha	110
A3	Zeta	109
B1	Omega	110

Final; Friday, 12 October
A2	Alpha	110
B1	Omega	106
Third place
B4	Theta	110
A3	Zeta	107

=== Quarter-finals ===
Delta vs. Theta

Wednesday, 10 October, 18:00 UTC−3 Tecnópolis, Court 1
Delta vs. Theta
#	Category	Delta	Score (Partition score)	Theta
1	MS	Mateo Delmastro (Argentina)	1–11 (1–11)	(Germany) Lukas Resch
2	WD	Phittayaporn Chaiwan (Thailand); Madouc Linders (Netherlands)	14–22 (13–11)	(Brazil) Jaqueline Lima (Czech Republic) Tereza Švábíková
3	WS	Elena Andreu (Spain)	17–33 (3–11)	(Japan) Hirari Mizui
4	XD	Arnaud Merklé (France); Phittayaporn Chaiwan (Thailand)	44–42 (27–9)	(Japan) Kodai Naraoka (Australia) Zecily Fung
5	MD	Dmitriy Panarin (Kazakhstan); Balázs Pápai (Hungary)	53–55 (9–13)	(Belgium) Julien Carraggi (Egypt) Mohamed Mostafa Kamel
6	MS	Dmitriy Panarin (Kazakhstan)	62–66 (9–11)	(Belgium) Julien Carraggi
7	WD	Elena Andreu (Spain); Madouc Linders (Netherlands)	76–77 (14–11)	(Australia) Zecily Fung (Brazil) Jaqueline Lima
8	WS	Petra Polanc (Slovenia)	82–88 (6–11)	(Czech Republic) Tereza Švábíková
9	XD	Balázs Pápai (Hungary); Petra Polanc (Slovenia)	88–99 (6–11)	(Japan) Kodai Naraoka (Japan) Hirari Mizui
10	MD	Mateo Delmastro (Argentina); Arnaud Merklé (France)	93–110 (5–11)	(Egypt) Mohammed Mostafa Kamel (Germany) Lukas Resch
Result

Alpha vs. Gamma

Wednesday, 10 October, 19:30 UTC−3 Tecnópolis, Court 1
Alpha vs. Gamma
#	Category	Alpha	Score (Partition score)	Gamma
1	WS	Jennie Gai (United States)	6–11 (6–11)	(India) Vaishnavi Reddy Jakka
2	MS	Lakshya Sen (India)	21–22 (15–11)	(China) Li Shifeng
3	WD	Hasini Ambalangodage (Sri Lanka); Maria Delcheva (Bulgaria)	33–31 (11–9)	(Algeria) Halla Bouksani (Peru) Fernanda Saponara
4	XD	Vannthoun Vath (Cambodia); Hasini Ambalangodage (Sri Lanka)	40–44 (7–13)	(Singapore) Joel Koh (Peru) Fernanda Saponara
5	MD	Giovanni Toti (Italy); Vannthoun Vath (Cambodia)	55–54 (15–10)	(El Salvador) Uriel Canjura (Chile) Alonso Medel
6	WS	Ashwathi Pillai (Sweden)	66–56 (11–2)	(Algeria) Halla Bouksani
7	MS	Brian Yang (Canada)	77–64 (11–8)	(Singapore) Joel Koh
8	WD	Maria Delcheva (Bulgaria); Jennie Gai (United States)	88–69 (11–5)	(Peru) Fernanda Saponara (India) Vaishnavi Reddy Jakka
9	XD	Lakshya Sen (India); Ashwithi Pillai (Sweden)	99–87 (11–18)	(China) Li Shifeng (India) Vaishnavi Reddy Jakka
10	MD	Giovanni Toti (Italy); Brian Yang (Canada)	110–94 (11–7)	(El Salvador) Uriel Canjura (Chile) Alonso Medel
Result

Zeta vs. Sigma

Wednesday, 10 October, 18:00 UTC−3 Tecnópolis, Court 3
Zeta vs. Sigma
#	Category	Zeta	Score (Partition score)	Sigma
1	WD	Jaslyn Hooi (Singapore); Nairoby Abigail Jiménez (Dominican Republic)	9–11 (9–11)	(United Kingdom) Grace King (China) Wang Zhiyi
2	WS	Maharani Sekar Batari (Indonesia)	22–12 (13–1)	(Cameroon) Madeleine Akoumba Ze
3	MS	Nhat Nguyen (Republic of Ireland)	33–22 (11–10)	(Indonesia) Ikhsan Rumbay
4	XD	Danylo Bosniuk (Ukraine); Vivien Sándorházi (Hungary)	44–28 (11–6)	(Moldova) Cristian Savin (United Kingdom) Grace King
5	MD	Kettiya Keoxay (Laos); Nhat Nguyen (Republic of Ireland)	55–47 (11–19)	(Indonesia) Ikhsan Rumbay (Moldova) Cristian Savin
6	WD	Nairoby Abigail Jiménez (Dominican Republic); Vivien Sándorházi (Hungary)	66–52 (11–5)	(Cameroon) Madeleine Akoumba Ze (Germany) Ann-Kathrin Spöri
7	WS	Maharani Sekar Batari (Indonesia)	75–77 (9–25)	(China) Wang Zhiyi
8	MS	Danylo Bosniuk (Ukraine)	84–88 (9–11)	(Moldova) Cristian Savin
9	XD	Christopher Grimley (United Kingdom); Jaslyn Hooi (Singapore)	99–93 (15–5)	(Netherlands) Dennis Koppen (Germany) Ann-Kathrin Spöri
10	MD	Christopher Grimley (United Kingdom); Kettiya Keoxay (Laos)	110–106 (11–13)	(Netherlands) Dennis Koppen (Indonesia) Ikhsan Rumbay
Result

Epsilon vs. Omega

Wednesday, 10 October, 19:30 UTC−3 Tecnópolis, Court 3
Epsilon vs. Omega
#	Category	Epsilon	Score (Partition score)	Omega
1	WS	Aminat Ilori (Nigeria)	8–11 (8–11)	(France) Léonice Huet
2	MS	Fabrício Farias (Brazil)	22–15 (14–4)	(Fiji) Chang Ho Kim
3	WD	Aminat Ilori (Nigeria); Nazlıcan İnci (Turkey)	33–30 (11–15)	(Chinese Taipei) Huang Yin-hsuan (Vietnam) Vũ Thị Anh Thư
4	XD	Chen Shiau-cheng (Chinese Taipei); Nazlıcan İnci (Turkey)	44–35 (11–5)	(Norway) Markus Barth (Vietnam) Vũ Thị Anh Thư
5	MD	Chen Shiau-cheng (Chinese Taipei); Nguyễn Hải Đăng (Vietnam)	55–41 (11–6)	(Norway) Markus Barth (New Zealand) Oscar Guo
6	WS	Vlada Ginga (Moldova)	66–60 (11–19)	(Chinese Taipei) Huang Yin-hsuan
7	MS	Nguyễn Hải Đăng (Vietnam)	77–62 (11–2)	(Fiji) Chang Ho Kim
8	WD	Vlada Ginga (Moldova); Goh Jin Wei (Malaysia)	88–76 (11–14)	(France) Léonice Huet (Ukraine) Anastasiia Prozorova
9	XD	Tomás Toledano (Spain); Goh Jin Wei (Malaysia)	98–99 (10–23)	(Ukraine) Anastasiia Prozorova (Thailand) Kunlavut Vitidsarn
10	MD	Fabrício Farias (Brazil); Tomás Toledano (Spain)	102–110 (4–11)	(New Zealand) Oscar Guo (Thailand) Kunlavut Vitidsarn
Result

=== Semi-finals ===
Theta vs. Alpha

Thursday, 11 October, 19:30 UTC−3 Tecnópolis, Court 1
Theta vs. Alpha
#	Category	Theta	Score (Partition score)	Alpha
1	MD	Julien Carraggi (Belgium); Mohamed Mostafa Kamel (Egypt)	4–11 (4–11)	(India) Lakshya Sen (Canada) Brian Yang
2	WS	Hirari Mizui (Japan)	20–22 (16–11)	(United States) Jennie Gai
3	WD	Jaqueline Lima (Brazil); Tereza Švábíková (Czech Republic)	25–33 (5–11)	(United States) Jennie Gai (Sweden) Ashwathi Pillai
4	MS	Kodai Naraoka (Japan)	31–44 (6–11)	(Canada) Brian Yang
5	XD	Zecily Fong (Australia); Lukas Resch (Germany)	43–55 (12–11)	(Sri Lanka) Hasini Ambalangodage (Italy) Giovanni Toti
6	MD	Mohamed Mostafa Kamel (Egypt); Lukas Resch (Germany)	49–66 (6–11)	(Italy) Giovanni Toti (Cambodia) Vannthoun Vath
7	WS	Tereza Švábíková (Czech Republic)	64–77 (15–11)	(Bulgaria) Maria Delcheva
8	WD	Zecily Fung (Australia); Jaqueline Lima (Brazil)	76–88 (12–11)	(Sri Lanka) Hasini Ambalangodage (Bulgaria) Maria Delcheva
9	MS	Julien Carraggi (Belgium)	82–99 (6–11)	(Italy) Giovanni Toti
10	XD	Kodai Naraoka (Japan); Hirari Mizui (Japan)	90–110 (8–11)	(India) Lakshya Sen (Sweden) Ashwathi Pillai
Result

Zeta vs. Omega

Thursday, 11 October, 18:00 UTC−3 Tecnópolis, Court 1
Zeta vs. Omega
#	Category	Zeta	Score (Partition score)	Omega
1	MS	Nhat Nguyen (Republic of Ireland)	11–8 (11–8)	(Norway) Markus Barth
2	MD	Kettiya Keoxay (Cambodia); Nhat Nguyen (Republic of Ireland)	22–10 (11–2)	(Norway) Markus Barth (Fiji) Chang Ho Kim
3	WS	Maharani Sekar Batari (Indonesia)	33–23 (11–13)	(Chinese Taipei) Huang Yin-hsuan
4	WD	Jaslyn Hooi (Singapore); Nairoby Abigail Jiménez (Dominican Republic)	44–40 (11–17)	(France) Léonice Huet (Ukraine) Anastasiia Prozorova
5	XD	Danylo Bosniuk (Ukraine); Vivien Sándorházi (Hungary)	52–55 (8–15)	(Thailand) Kunlavut Vitidsarn (Ukraine) Anastasiia Prozorova
6	MS	Danylo Bosniuk (Ukraine)	66–57 (14–2)	(Fiji) Chang Ho Kim
7	MD	Christopher Grimley (United Kingdom); Kettiya Keoxay (Laos)	77–73 (11–18)	(New Zealand) Oscar Guo (Thailand) Kunlavut Vitidsarn
8	WS	Maharani Sekar Batari (Indonesia)	88–84 (11–11)	(Chinese Taipei) Huang Yin-hsuan
9	WD	Nairoby Abigail Jiménez (Dominican Republic); Vivien Sándorházi (Hungary)	99–98 (11–14)	(France) Léonice Huet (Vietnam) Vũ Thị Anh Thư
10	XD	Christopher Grimley (United Kingdom); Jaslyn Hooi (Singapore)	109–110 (10–12)	(New Zealand) Oscar Guo (Vietnam) Vũ Thị Anh Thư
Result

=== Medal matches ===
Bronze medal match – Theta vs. Zeta

Friday, 12 October, 13:30 UTC−3 Tecnópolis, Court 1
Theta vs. Zeta
#	Category	Theta	Score (Partition score)	Zeta
1	WD	Jaqueline Lima (Brazil); Tereza Švábíková (Czech Republic)	11–8 (11–8)	(Dominican Republic) Nairoby Abigail Jiménez (Hungary) Vivien Sándorházi
2	XD	Kodai Naraoka (Japan); Zecily Fung (Australia)	14–22 (3–14)	(United Kingdom) Christopher Grimley (Singapore) Jaslyn Hooi
3	WS	Hirari Mizui (Japan)	33–25 (19–3)	(Indonesia) Maharani Sekar Batari
4	MD	Julien Carraggi (Belgium); Lukas Resch (Germany)	44–30 (11–5)	(United Kingdom) Christopher Grimley (Laos) Kettiya Keoxay
5	MS	Julien Carraggi (Belgium)	55–42 (11–12)	(Ukraine) Danylo Bosniuk
6	WD	Zecily Fung (Australia); Jaqueline Lima (Brazil)	66–63 (11–21)	(Singapore) Jaslyn Hooi (Dominican Republic) Nairoby Abigaul Jiménez
7	XD	Kodai Naraoka (Japan); Hirari Mizui (Japan)	77–72 (11–9)	(Republic of Ireland) Nhat Nguyen (Hungary) Vivien Sándorházi
8	WS	Tereza Švábíková (Czech Republic)	88–84 (11–12)	(Indonesia) Maharani Sekar Batari
9	MD	Julien Carraggi (Belgium); Lukas Resch (Germany)	99–96 (11–12)	(Ukraine) Danylo Bosniuk (Republic of Ireland) Nhat Nguyen
10	MS	Mohamed Mostafa Kamel (Egypt)	110–107 (11–11)	(Laos) Kettiya Keoxay
Result

Gold medal match – Alpha vs. Omega

Friday, 12 October, 19:00 UTC−3 Tecnópolis, Court 1
Alpha vs. Omega
#	Category	Alpha	Score (Partition score)	Omega
1	MD	Giovanni Toti (Italy); Vannthoun Vath (Cambodia)	11–9 (11–9)	(Norway) Markus Barth (Fiji) Chang Ho Kim
2	WS	Maria Delcheva (Bulgaria)	20–22 (9–13)	(Chinese Taipei) Huang Yin-hsuan
3	XD	Lakshya Sen (India); Ashwathi Pillai (Sweden)	28–33 (8–11)	(Thailand) Kunlavut Vitidsarn (Ukraine) Anastasiia Prozorova
4	MS	Brian Yang (Canada)	44–42 (16–9)	(Thailand) Kunlavut Vitidsarn
5	WD	Jennie Gai (United States); Ashwathi Pillai (Sweden)	52–55 (8–13)	(France) Léonice Huet (Ukraine) Anastasiia Prozorova
6	MD	Vannthoun Vath (Cambodia); Brian Yang (Canada)	66–63 (14–8)	(New Zealand) Oscar Guo (Fiji) Chang Ho Kim
7	WS	Jennie Gai (United States)	77–75 (11–12)	(Chinese Taipei) Huang Yin-hsuan
8	XD	Lakshya Sen (India); Hasini Ambalangodage (Sri Lanka)	88–83 (11–8)	(New Zealand) Oscar Guo (Vietnam) Vũ Thị Anh Thư
9	MS	Giovanni Toti (Italy)	99–88 (11–5)	(Norway) Markus Barth
10	WD	Hasini Ambalangodage (Sri Lanka); Maria Delcheva (Bulgaria)	110–106 (11–18)	(France) Léonice Huet (Vietnam) Vũ Thị Anh Thư
Result
