= Malaysia at the 2018 Summer Youth Olympics =

- IOC code: MAS
- NOC: Olympic Council of Malaysia
- Website: http://www.olympic.org.my/

in Buenos Aires, Argentina 6 – 18 October 2018
- Competitors: 20 in 8 sports
- Flag bearer: Goh Jin Wei
- Medals Ranked 39th: Gold 2 Silver 0 Bronze 0 Total 2

Summer Youth Olympics appearances (overview)
- 2010; 2014; 2018; 2026

Malaysia competed at the 2018 Summer Youth Olympics in Buenos Aires, Argentina from 6 October to 18 October 2018. The chef-de-mission of the contingent was former two-time Olympian archer Cheng Chu Sian. Malaysia won its first gold medal at an Olympic event, having previously won silver and bronze medals.

Goh Jin Wei became the first athlete to win a Youth Olympic Games gold medal for Malaysia the second Malaysian to emerge victorious at the Youth Olympics since shuttler Cheam June Wei, who won mixed doubles gold under the Mixed-NOCs flag in 2014, and The national men's junior hockey 5s squad claimed the second gold medal for the Malaysian contingent at the 2018 Youth Olympic Games in Buenos Aires, Argentina. Meanwhile, National teen gymnast Rayna Hoh Khai Ling bagged a silver medal at the Youth Olympic Games through Mixed multi-discipline team in Gymnastics was not credited to the individual nation's medal tally as the event was a mixed-National Olympic Committees event in which athletes from different nations team up to compete under the Olympic flag.

As squash contested as demonstration sports in the games, The national junior reckons squash's Chan Yiwen and Siow Yee Xian being named the ambassador for the Youth Olympic Games in Buenos Aires, Argentina and will be among 36 players from 27 nations who will get a chance to experience the sport's first taste of Olympic competition. They debuted at the Youth Olympics as an exhibition sport with no medals at stake will stand the sport in good stead as it bids to get into the 2024 Summer Olympics in Paris.

== Media coverage ==
Satellite television company Astro broadcast the sporting event in Malaysia.

== Medalists ==
Medals awarded to participants of Mixed-NOC teams are represented in italics. These medals are not included towards the individual NOC medal tally.

Medal	Name	Sport	Event	Date
Gold	Goh Jin Wei (MAS)	Badminton	Girls' singles	12 October
Gold	Malaysia's Men's Hockey 5s team: Hamiz Ahir (MAS); Shahrul Saupi (MAS); Amirul Azahar (MAS); Arif Ishak (MAS); Syarman Mat (MAS); Kamaruzaman Kamarudin (MAS); Muhibuddin Moharam (MAS); Firdaus Rosdi (MAS); Akhimullah Anuar (MAS)	Field hockey	Boys' Tournament	14 October

Medalists in mixed NOCs events

Medal	Name	Sport	Event	Date
Silver	Team Max Whitlock (MIX): Rayna Hoh Khai Ling (MAS)	Gymnastics	Mixed multi-discipline team	10 October

== Athletics ==
- Boys' 100m - Muhammad Fakhrul Abdul Aziz

Track event

Athlete	Event	Stage 1		Stage 2		Final	
Athlete	Event	Result	Rank	Result	Rank	Result	Rank
Muhammad Fakhrul Abdul Aziz	100 m	11.10	15	10.73	16	21.83	14

== Badminton ==
Malaysia qualified one player based on the Badminton Junior World Rankings.

- Girls' singles - Goh Jin Wei

Singles

Athlete	Event	Group stage				Quarterfinal	Semifinal	Final / BM	Rank
Athlete	Event	Opposition Score	Opposition Score	Opposition Score	Rank	Opposition Score	Opposition Score	Opposition Score	Rank
Goh Jin Wei	Girls' singles	Batari (INA) W 2–0 (21–11, 21–15); 31 mins	Pillai (SWE) W 2–0 (21–15, 21–12); 28 mins	Spoeri (GER) W 2–1 (21–7, 18–21,21–9); 40 mins	1 Q	Vu Thi Anh Thu (VIE) W 2–0 (21–12, 21–9); 26 mins	Phittayaporn Chaiwan (THA) W 2–1 (19–21, 21–15, 21–13); 61 mins	Wang Zhiyi (CHN) W 2–1 (16–21, 21–13, 21–19); 71 mins	1st place, gold medalist(s)

Mixed Teams

Athlete	Event	Group stage				Quarterfinal	Semifinal	Final / BM	Rank
Athlete	Event	Opposition Score	Opposition Score	Opposition Score	Rank	Opposition Score	Opposition Score	Opposition Score	Rank
Goh Jin Wei (Epsilon)	Mixed teams	Alpha (MIX) L 98–110; 92 mins	Zeta (MIX) L 89–110; 76 mins	Delta (MIX) W 110–108; 457 mins	4 Q	Omega (MIX) L 102–110 mins	Did not advance		=5

== Diving ==
- Boys' 10m Platform - Jellson Jabillin
- Girls' 3m Springboard - Kimberly Bong Qian Ping
- Girls' 10m Platform - Kimberly Bong Qian Ping

Athlete	Event	Preliminary		Final	
Athlete	Event	Points	Rank	Points	Rank
Jellson Jabillin	Boys' 10m platform	514.05	4 Q	513.25	4
Kimberly Bong Qian Ping	Girls' 3m springboard	396.85	8 Q	427.10	6
Kimberly Bong Qian Ping	Girls' 10m platform	371.50	4 Q	385.40	4
Jellson Jabillin (MAS); Mélodie Leclerc (CAN)	Mixed Team	—N/a		330.00	7
Kimberly Bong Qian Ping (MAS); Nikolaos Molvalis (GRE)	Mixed Team	—N/a		347.10	4

== Field hockey ==
Malaysia qualified one event based on its performance at the 2018 Asian Youth Olympic Games Qualifier.

=== Boys' tournament ===
Team	Event	Group stage						Quarterfinal	Semifinal	Final / BM	Rank
Team	Event	Opposition Score	Opposition Score	Opposition Score	Opposition Score	Opposition Score	Rank	Opposition Score	Opposition Score	Opposition Score	Rank
Malaysia	Boys' Tournament	Vanuatu W 14–0	Mexico W 4–2	Zambia W 7–2	Argentina L 2–4	Poland W 4–3	2 Q	Austria W 2–0	Zambia W 7–4	India W 4-2	1st place, gold medalist(s)

Preliminary round

Pos	Team	Pld	W	D	L	GF	GA	GD	Pts	Qualification
1	Argentina (H)	5	5	0	0	36	6	+30	15	Quarterfinals
2	Malaysia	5	4	0	1	31	11	+20	12	Quarterfinals
3	Poland	5	2	0	3	29	17	+12	6	Quarterfinals
4	Zambia	5	2	0	3	29	23	+6	6	Quarterfinals
5	Mexico	5	2	0	3	19	20	−1	6	9th place game
6	Vanuatu	5	0	0	5	5	72	−67	0	11th place game

Source: FIH
Rules for classification: 1) Points; 2) Goal difference; 3) Goals scored; 4) Head-to-head result.
(H) Hosts

7 October 2018
10:15

Malaysia	14–0	Vanuatu
Anuar 3', 7', 8', 14', 15', 20', 20'; Azahar 7', 13'; Mat 9'; Moharam 11', 12'; Rosdi 18'; Ishak 18'	Report

Umpires:
Peter Kabaso (KEN)
Nick Saunders (NZL)

8 October 2018
17:00

Malaysia	4–2	Mexico
Anuar 4'; Ishak 8', 19'; Mat 19'	Report	Villegas 14'; Estrada 20'

Umpires:
Hristiyan Vasilev (BUL)
Peter Kabaso (KEN)

9 October 2018
11:45

Zambia	2–7	Malaysia
Mulenga 2', 3'	Report	Rosdi 3'; Anuar 6', 10', 12', 20'; Azahar 9'; Mat 13'

Umpires:
Peter Kabaso (KEN)
James Unkles (AUS)

10 October 2018
17:00

Malaysia	2–4	Argentina
Rosdi 5'; Ishak 9'	Report	Sarto 8', 14', 19'; Zarate 10'

Umpires:
James Unkles (AUS)
Peter Kabaso (KEN)

11 October 2018
10:15

Poland	3–4	Malaysia
Jarzyński 7'; E. Bembenek 7'; Nowkowski 11'	Report	Anuar 1', 16', 17'; Azahar 3'

Umpires:
Hideki Kinoshita (JPN)
James Unkles (AUS)

Quarterfinals

12 October 2018
9:00

Malaysia	2–0	Austria
Anuar 11', 19'	Report

Umpires:
Hideki Kinoshita (JPN)
Jonathan Altamirano (MEX)

Semifinals

13 October 2018
14:00

Malaysia	7–4	Zambia
Anuar 1', 9', 20'; Rosdi 4', 7'; Moharam 12'; Mat 13'	Report	Moyo 6', 19'; Bwali 14', 18'

Umpires:
Nick Saunders (NZL)
Jonathan Altamirano (MEX)

Gold medal game

14 October 2018
15:00

India	2–4	Malaysia
Prasad 3', 6'	Report	Rosdi 5'; Anuar 14', 19'; Azahar 18'

Umpires:
Jonathan Altamirano (MEX)
Hristiyan Vasilev (BUL)

== Gymnastics ==
=== Artistic ===
Malaysia qualified one gymnast based on its performance at the 2018 Asian Junior Championship.

- Girls' artistic individual all-around - Zarith Imaan Khalid

Girls

Athlete	Event	Apparatus				Total	Rank
Athlete	Event	V Rank	UB Rank	BB Rank	F Rank	Total	Rank
Zarith Imaan Khalid	Qualification	12.100; 29	10.100; 27	11.300; 19	11.366; 24	44.866	26

=== Rhythmic ===
Malaysia qualified one gymnast based on its performance at the 2018 Asian Junior Championship.

- Girls' rhythmic individual all-around - Rayna Hoh Khai Ling

Individual

Athlete	Event	Qualification						Final					
Athlete	Event	Hoop Rank	Ball Rank	Clubs Rank	Ribbon Rank	Total	Rank	Hoop Rank	Ball Rank	Clubs Rank	Ribbon Rank	Total	Rank
Rayna Hoh Khai Ling	Individual all-around	15.600; 8	12.700; 27	15.050; 10	10.450; 29	53.800	19	did not advance					

=== Mixed Team ===
Athlete	Event	Final
Athlete	Event	Rank
Rayna Hoh Khai Ling (Team Max Whitlock)	Mixed multi-discipline team	2nd place, silver medalist(s)
Zarith Imaan Khalid (Team Nadia Comaneci)	Mixed multi-discipline team	9

== Swimming ==
- Boys' 50m Butterfly - Low Zheng Yong
- Boys' 100m Butterfly - Low Zheng Yong
- Boys' 200m Butterfly - Low Zheng Yong
- Boys' 400m Freestyle - Arvin Chahal
- Boys' 200m Individual Medley - Low Zheng Yong
- Boys' 200m Individual Medley - Arvin Chahal

Boys

Athlete	Event	Heat		Semifinal		Final	
Athlete	Event	Time	Rank	Time	Rank	Time	Rank
Arvin Chahal	400 m freestyle	4:06.11	30	did not advance			
Arvin Chahal	200m Individual Medley	2:08.56	17	—N/a		did not advance	
Low Zheng Yong	50m Butterfly	26.24	43	did not advance			
Low Zheng Yong	100m Butterfly	57.21	39	did not advance			
Low Zheng Yong	200m Butterfly	2:06.87	29	—N/a		did not advance	
Low Zheng Yong	200m Individual Medley	2:12.66	20	—N/a		did not advance	

== Table tennis ==
Malaysia qualified one table tennis player based on its performance at the Road to Buenos Aires (Asia) series. Later Malaysia qualified a female table tennis player based on its performance at the Road to Buenos Aires (Oceania) series.

- Boys' singles - Javen Choong
- Girls' singles - Alice Li Sian Chang

Singles

Athlete	Event	Group stage				Round of 16	Quarterfinal	Semifinal	Final / BM	Rank
Athlete	Event	Opposition Score	Opposition Score	Opposition Score	Rank	Opposition Score	Opposition Score	Opposition Score	Opposition Score	Rank
Javen Choong	Boys' singles	Ahmadian (IRI) L 2–4 (11–8, 8–11, 6–11, 8–11, 11–6, 13–15); 39 mins	Stankevicius (LTU) W 4–3 (9–11, 7–11, 12–10, 9–11, 11–9, 11–9, 11–6); 52 mins	Thakkar (IND) L 2–4 (6–11, 11–7,11–13, 4–11, 11–9, 5–11); 36 mins	3	Did not advance				=17
Alice Li Sian Chang	Girls' singles	Schreiner (GER) L 1–4 (12–10, 5–11, 10–12, 11–13, 9–11); 50 mins	Laurenti (ITA) L 0–4 (3–11, 5–11, 7–11, 7–11); 27 mins	Diaz (PUR) L 1–4 (10–12, 11–6,5–11, 4–11, 6–11); 37 mins	4	Did not advance				=25

Mixed International Team

Athlete	Event	Group stage				Round of 16	Quarterfinal	Semifinal	Final / BM	Rank
Athlete	Event	Opposition Score	Opposition Score	Opposition Score	Rank	Opposition Score	Opposition Score	Opposition Score	Opposition Score	Rank
Javen Choong (MAS); Alice Li Sian Chang (MAS)	Mixed team	Brazil L 1–2; 1 hour 29 mins	Europe-5 (MIX) L 1–2; 1 hour 29 mins	Egypt L 1–2; 1 hour 29 mins	4	Did not advance				=25

== Triathlon ==
Malaysia qualified one athlete based on its performance at the 2018 Asian Youth Olympic Games Qualifier.

- Boys' individual - Chong Xian Hao

Boys

Athlete	Event	Final	
Athlete	Event	Result	Rank
Chong Xian Hao	Boys'	1:00:25	29
Chong Xian Hao (Asia 2)	Mixed relay	1:36:49 1P	13
