= Badminton at the 2018 Summer Youth Olympics =

Badminton at the III Summer Youth Olympic Games
- Badminton pictogram
- Venue: Tecnópolis
- Dates: 7–12 October
- No. of events: 3 (1 boys, 1 girls, 1 mixed)
- Competitors: 63 (32 boys and 31 girls) from 46 nations

Badminton at the 2018 Summer Youth Olympics was held from 7 to 12 October. The events took place at the Tecnópolis in Buenos Aires, Argentina.

== Qualification ==
A total of 32 athletes participated in each gender. Each National Olympic Committee (NOC) could enter a maximum of 2 competitors per gender should they both rank in the top 4 in the BWF Junior World Rankings. Otherwise each NOC would be allowed a maximum of 1 competitor per gender.

Each of the five continents was represented in each gender. 27 quotas per gender were decided based on BWF World Junior Ranking List on 3 May 2018. Host nation Argentina was ensured one quota place each gender. The remaining 4 quotas were made eligible for Universality Places. To be eligible to participate, athletes were mandated to be on BWF World Junior Ranking List on 3 May 2018 and have been born between 1 January 2000 and 31 December 2003.

=== Qualification summary ===
NOC	Boy	Girl	Total athletes
Algeria		1	1
Argentina	1		1
Australia		1	1
Belgium	1		1
Brazil	1	1	2
Bulgaria		1	1
Cambodia	1		1
Cameroon		1	1
Canada	1		1
Chile	1		1
China	1	2	3
Chinese Taipei	1	1	2
Czech Republic		1	1
Dominican Republic		1	1
Egypt	1		1
El Salvador	1		1
Fiji	1		1
France	1	1	2
Germany	1	1	2
Great Britain	1	1	2
Hungary	1	1	2
India	1	1	2
Indonesia	1	1	2
Ireland	1		1
Italy	1		1
Japan	1	1	2
Kazakhstan	1		1
Laos	1		1
Malaysia		1	1
Moldova	1	1	2
Nepal	1		1
Netherlands	1	1	2
New Zealand	1		1
Nigeria		1	1
Norway	1		1
Peru		1	1
Singapore	1	1	2
Slovenia		1	1
Spain	1	1	2
Sri Lanka		1	1
Sweden		1	1
Thailand	1	1	2
Turkey		1	1
Ukraine	1	1	2
United States		1	1
Vietnam	1	1	2
Total: 46 NOCs	32	32	64

=== Boys ===
No.	Rank	Player	NOC	Note
1	1	Kunlavut Vitidsarn	Thailand	Asia
2	2	Kodai Naraoka	Japan	
3	3	Nhat Nguyen	Ireland	Europe
4	4	Lakshya Sen	India	
5	5	Li Shifeng	China	
6	6	Ikhsan Rumbay	Indonesia	
7	9	Arnaud Merklé	France	
8	11	Chen Shiau-cheng	Chinese Taipei	
9	14	Brian Yang	Canada	America
10	15	Dmitriy Panarin	Kazakhstan	
11	16	Oscar Guo	New Zealand	Oceania
12	18	Christopher Grimley	Great Britain	
13	19	Cristian Savin	Moldova	
14	21	Julien Carraggi	Belgium	
15	23	Fabricio Farias	Brazil	
16	24	Joel Koh	Singapore	
17	25	Dennis Koppen	Netherlands	
18	28	Lukas Resch	Germany	
19	29	Danylo Bosniuk	Ukraine	
20	32	Giovanni Toti	Italy	
21	33	Markus Barth	Norway	
22	34	Alonso Medel	Chile	
23	35	Nguyễn Hải Đăng	Vietnam	
24	36	Balázs Pápai	Hungary	
25	38	Uriel Canjura	El Salvador	
26	40	Tomás Toledano	Spain	Reallocation
27	45	Mohamed Mostafa Kamel	Egypt	Africa
28	146	Rukesh Maharjan	Nepal	Universality Places
29	186	Mateo Delmastro	Argentina	Host Nation
30	360	Chang Ho Kim	Fiji	Universality Places
31	531	Kettiya Keoxay	Laos	Universality Places
32	830	Vannthoun Vath	Cambodia	Universality Places

- Quota spots earned by Russia was returned, and were subsequently reallocated to Spain.

=== Girls ===
No.	Rank	Player	NOC	Note
1	1	Phittayaporn Chaiwan	Thailand	Asia
2	2	Wang Zhiyi	China	
3	3	Goh Jin Wei	Malaysia	
4	4	~~Wei Yaxin~~	China	Did not compete
5	5	Jakka Vaishnavi Reddy	India	
6	8	Maria Delcheva	Bulgaria	Europe
7	10	Huang Yin-hsuan	Chinese Taipei	
8	12	Vivien Sándorházi	Hungary	
9	20	Tereza Švábíková	Czech Republic	
10	21	Hirari Mizui	Japan	
11	24	Fernanda Saponara Rivva	Peru	
12	25	Grace King	Great Britain	
13	27	Nazlıcan İnci	Turkey	
14	28	Jaslyn Hooi	Singapore	
15	29	Léonice Huet	France	
16	30	Jennie Gai	United States	America
17	33	Petra Polanc	Slovenia	
18	35	Halla Bouksani	Algeria	Africa
19	36	Vũ Thị Anh Thư	Vietnam	
20	37	Elena Andreu	Spain	
21	38	Vlada Gynga	Moldova	
22	41	Ann-Kathrin Spöri	Germany	
23	42	Nairoby Abigail Jiménez	Dominican Republic	Reallocation
24	43	Jaqueline Lima	Brazil	Reallocation
25	44	Aswathi Pillai	Sweden	Reallocation
26	47	Hasini Nusaka Ambalangodage	Sri Lanka	Reallocation
27	48	Maharani Sekar Batari	Indonesia	Reallocation
28	53	Anastasiia Prozorova	Ukraine	Reallocation
29	54	Madouc Linders	Netherlands	Reallocation
30	62	Zecily Fung	Australia	Oceania
31	258	Madeiline Caren Akoumba Ze	Cameroon	Universality Places
32	494	Amina Oluwafunke Ilori	Nigeria	Universality Places

- Quota spots earned by Denmark, South Korea and Indonesia were returned, and were subsequently reallocated to Dominican Republic, Brazil and Sweden. One universality spot was also not used and this was reallocated to the next eligible nation in the world rankings: Sri Lanka. Later the quota place for Russia, the host spot, and another universality spot were returned and reallocated to Indonesia, Ukraine, and the Netherlands respectively. Eventually there were 31 participants, Wei Yaxin from China did not compete.

== Medal summary ==
=== Medal table ===
Rank	Nation	Gold	Silver	Bronze	Total
–	Mixed-NOCs	1	1	1	3
1	China	1	1	0	2
2	Malaysia	1	0	0	1
3	India	0	1	0	1
4	Japan	0	0	1	1
4	Thailand	0	0	1	1
Totals (5 entries)		3	3	3	9

=== Events ===
Event	Gold	Silver	Bronze
Boys' singles	Li Shifeng; China	Lakshya Sen; India	Kodai Naraoka; Japan
Girls' singles	Goh Jin Wei; Malaysia	Wang Zhiyi; China	Phittayaporn Chaiwan; Thailand
Mixed teams	Alpha; Lakshya Sen; India; Giovanni Toti; Italy; Vannthoun Vath; Cambodia; Brian Yang; Canada; Hasini Nusaka Ambalangodage; Sri Lanka; Maria Delcheva; Bulgaria; Jennie Gai; United States; Ashwathi Pillai; Sweden	Omega; Markus Barth; Norway; Oscar Guo; New Zealand; Chang Ho Kim; Fiji; Kunlavut Vitidsarn; Thailand; Huang Yin-hsuan; Chinese Taipei; Léonice Huet; France; Anastasiya Prozorova; Ukraine; Vũ Thị Anh Thư; Vietnam	Theta; Julien Carraggi; Belgium; Mohamed Mostafa Kamel; Egypt; Kodai Naraoka; Japan; Lukas Resch; Germany; Zecily Fung; Australia; Jaqueline Lima; Brazil; Hirari Mizui; Japan; Tereza Švábíková; Czech Republic
