= Future Series Nouvelle-Aquitaine =

Badminton championships

The Future Series Nouvelle-Aquitaine is an international badminton tournament held in Nouvelle-Aquitaine, France. The event is part of the Badminton World Federation's Future Series and part of the Badminton Europe Elite Circuit. It was held for the first time in 2022.

== Host city ==
- 2022–now: Pessac

== Past winners ==
Year	Men's singles	Women's singles	Men's doubles	Women's doubles	Mixed doubles	Ref
2022	(Singapore) Lim Ming Hong	(Vietnam) Vũ Thị Anh Thư	(Thailand) Peeratchai Sukphun (Thailand) Pakkapon Teeraratsakul	(Sweden) Ronak Olyaee (Sweden) Nathalie Wang	(Denmark) Emil Lauritzen (Denmark) Signe Schulz	
2023	(India) Bharat Raghav	(Chinese Taipei) Tung Ciou-tong	(France) Éloi Adam (France) Léo Rossi	(Turkey) Bengisu Erçetin (Turkey) Nazlıcan İnci	(France) Éloi Adam (France) Sharone Bauer	
2024	(England) Cholan Kayan	(Czech Republic) Petra Maixnerová	(France) Aymeric Tores (Netherlands) Dyon van Wijlick	(Netherlands) Meerte Loos (Netherlands) Kelly van Buiten	(France) Aymeric Tores (France) Lilou Schaffner	
2025	(Malaysia) Lim Ming Hong	(India) Meghana Reddy	(Spain) Daniel Franco (Spain) Rodrigo Sanjurjo	(Spain) Nikol Carulla (Spain) Carmen Maria Jiménez	(Netherlands) Andy Buijk (Netherlands) Meerte Loos	
2026	(Denmark) Victor Ørding Kauffmann	(Vietnam) Vũ Thị Trang	(France) Rayan Benaissa (France) Mady Sow	(Netherlands) Kirsten de Wit (Netherlands) Meerte Loos	(Netherlands) Joep Strooper (Netherlands) Sterre Bang	

== Performances by nation ==
As of the 2026 edition

No	Nation	MS	WS	MD	WD	XD	Total
1	France			2.5		2	4.5
1	Netherlands			0.5	2	2	4.5
3	Denmark	1				1	2
3	India	1	1				2
3	Spain			1	1		2
3	Vietnam		2				2
7	Chinese Taipei		1				1
7	Czech Republic		1				1
7	England	1					1
7	Malaysia	1					1
7	Singapore	1					1
7	Sweden				1		1
7	Thailand			1			1
7	Turkey				1		1
Total		5	5	5	5	5	25
