= Jaslyn Hooi =

Singaporean badminton player (born 2000)

Jaslyn Hooi Yue Yann 许妤欣
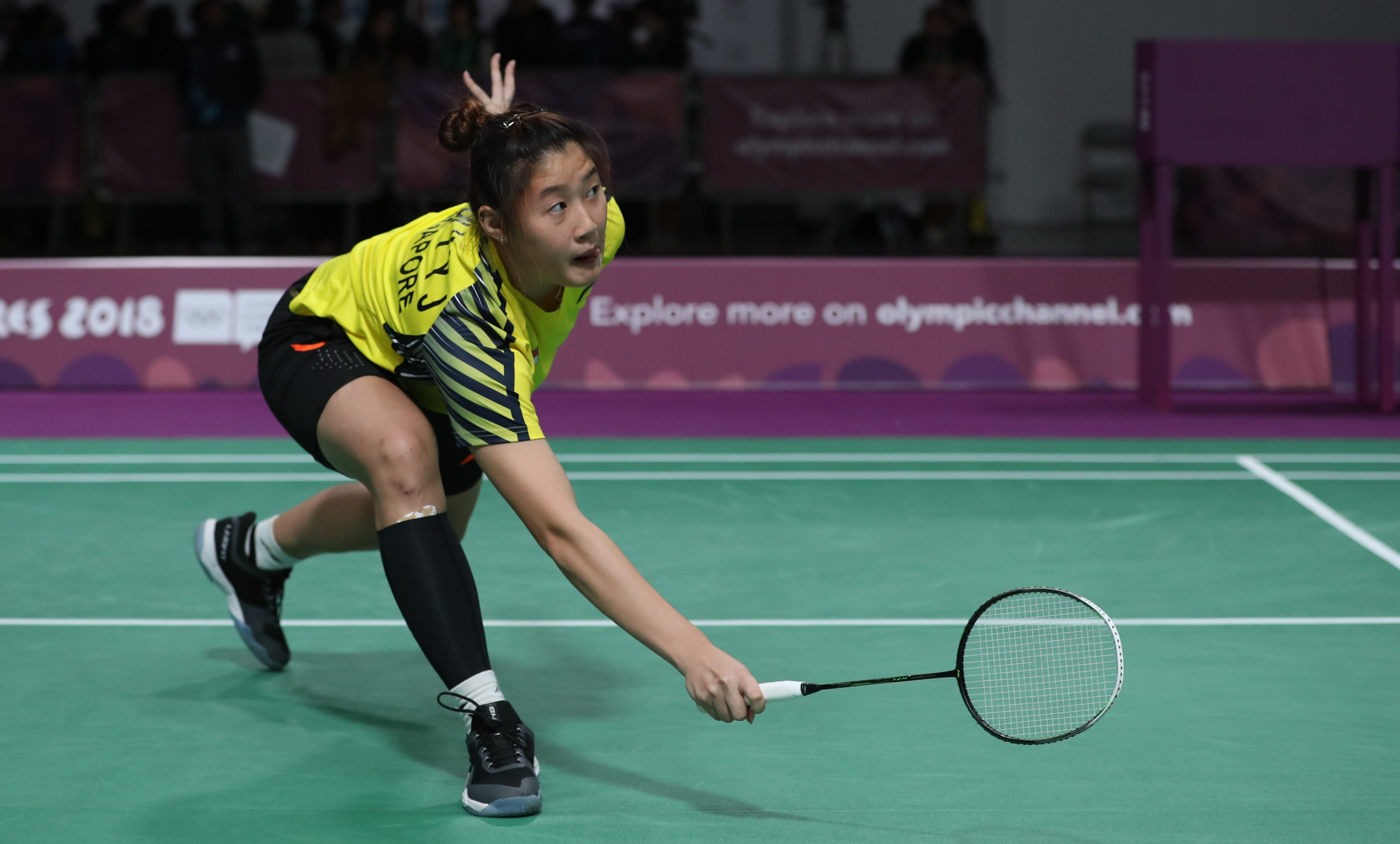
- Hooi during the girls' singles bronze medal match at the 2018 Summer Youth Olympics

Personal information
- Born: Jaslyn Hooi Yue Yann; 5 October 2000 (age 26) Penang, Malaysia

Sport
- Country: Singapore
- Sport: Badminton
- Handedness: Right
- Coached by: Kim Ji Hyun

Women's singles
- Highest ranking: 83 (4 September 2022)
- Current ranking: 189 (13 January 2026)
- BWF profile
Medal record
Women's badminton
Representing Singapore
SEA Games
| Bronze medal – third place | 2019 Philippines | Women's team |
| Bronze medal – third place | 2021 Vietnam | Women's team |
| Bronze medal – third place | 2025 Thailand | Women's team |

Jaslyn Hooi Yue Yann (Chinese: 许妤欣; pinyin: Xǔ Yúxīn; born 5 October 2000) is a Singaporean badminton player. At the age of 17, she represented Singapore at the 2018 Summer Youth Olympics and reached the semi-final in girls’ badminton singles tournament but eventually finished fourth. She won bronze medals for Singapore as part of the team at the 2019, 2021, and 2025 SEA Games.

== Early life and education ==
Hooi was born in Penang, Malaysia, on 5 October 2000. She first played badminton when she was seven under the influence of her father, who was a former state badminton player. She started formal training under private coaches at the age of nine. After completing her primary school education at Hun Bin Primary School in Penang, Hooi was offered a scholarship by the Singapore Sports School. She moved to Singapore at the age of 13 and started playing at international junior tournaments in 2015. Hooi became a member of the Singapore national badminton team since 2017. Hooi became a Singapore citizen in 2018.

Hooi attended the customised Diploma in Business Studies (Entrepreneurship Management Option) catered specifically for student-athletes by Ngee Ann Polytechnic. During the COVID-19 period, when international travel and competitions were restricted, she completed a 30-week internship as an investment analyst while juggling intensive training sessions. Hooi graduated on 3 May 2021 with an impressive 3.8 GPA score.

== Career ==
Hooi won one title and two runners-up at international competitions while at the junior level. She was the girls’ single under-17 champion at the Singapore Youth International Series 2016. She also won 2nd place in girls’ double under-17 partnering with Jia Rong Sito at the same tournament. In 2017, she competed at the Jaya Raya International, an under-19 Junior Grand Prix tournament, and emerged as the runner-up in the women's single competition.

Hooi was chosen to represent Singapore at the 2018 Summer Youth Olympics in Buenos Aires, Argentina, based on her Badminton World Federation (BWF) World Junior Ranking (no. 28). Despite spraining her right foot during one of the preliminary matches, Hooi qualified for the knockout stage after topping Group E. Playing through pain, she managed to win the quarter-final by beating Jennie Gai (USA) in straight sets of 21–16, 21–18. In the semi-final, she faced the 2nd-ranked world junior player, Wang Zhiyi from China, but lost 11–21, 10–21. Hooi missed out on a medal after succumbing to Phittayaporn Chaiwan of Thailand in the bronze medal decider match with the scoreline of 9–21, 13–21.

In 2019, Hooi actively competed at the senior level International Challenge/Series tournaments worldwide. She achieved semi-final finishes at the Iran Fajr International and Dubai International. She also reached the quarter-finals of Waikato, Mongolia, and Malaysia Internationals.

Hooi was the Captain of the Singapore women’s badminton team at the 2019 SEA Games. In the first round, Hooi turned the tide for Singapore after the team fell 0–2 behind the Philippines. She beat Sarah Barredo in straight sets, 21–13, 21–15, and Singapore won with 3-2 eventually. During the semi-final against Indonesia, Hooi, then ranked world no. 99, sprung an upset in the second singles match, beating world no. 27 Fitriani in rubber sets of 13–21, 21–16, 21–16. However, her winning did not prevent Singapore from losing 1-3 to Indonesia, and the team settled for a joint bronze medal.

Between 2020 and 2021, international sports competitions were severely limited during the COVID-19 pandemic. Hooi turned her attention locally and clinched the women's singles titles at the Singaporean National Badminton Championships for two consecutive years (2020, 2021). The international sports schedule gradually re-opened by September 2021, and Hooi beat India's Samiya Imad Farooqui 21-11, 21-9 to win her first senior title at the Polish International final. She also made it to the semi-final of Belgian International and quarter-finals of Dutch Open and Czech Open, all within the month of October.

In 2022, Hooi began competing in bigger games, including the Badminton World Federation BWF World Tour tournaments and the Badminton Asia Championships. However, she suffered early-round exits in the hands of top players such as Kim Ga-eun (Korea Open), Chen Yufei (Korea Masters), and P. V. Sindhu (Badminton Asia Championships).

At the 2021 SEA Games that was delayed due to COVID-19 until May 2022, Hooi again represented the Singapore women’s badminton team in the first round against the Philippines. Hooi won the second singles against Mikaela de Guzman in two sets of 21–17, 21-17, winning the game for Singapore at 3–0. Singapore retained the joint bronze medal after losing 0–3 to Thailand in the semi-final, in which Hooi was not featured.

An injury in the second half of 2022 after the 2021 SEA Games completely derailed Hooi's ambitious plan to surge up the World Ranking to have a shot at the 2024 Olympics in Paris. Recovery took her one and a half years. During which, she also missed the chance to compete in the 2022 Commonwealth Games and 2023 SEA Games.

Hooi returned to international competitions in May 2023. Her extended absence had depleted all her ranking points. As an unranked player, she had to enter the lower-tier BWF International Series tournaments starting from the qualifying rounds. Nevertheless, she reached the quarter-final of Thailand International and moved on to clinch two back-to-back titles down under. First at the Bendigo International and then the Sydney International in October 2023.

In 2024, Hooi reached the semi-finals of the international tournaments at Portugal, Sydney, and Bendigo. After failing to defend her titles in Australia, Hooi came close to winning another in New Zealand at the North Harbour International, only to be defeated in the final by Tsai Hsin-pei of Chinese Taipei 18–21, 13–21.

Hooi competed in only a handful of international tournaments in 2025 and mostly exited in the first round. She qualified for the Badminton Asia Championships in April but was eliminated in the group stage. She also played in the World Championships for the first time but lost to 6th-seeded Pornpawee Chochuwong of Thailand, 14-21, 8-21, in the round of 64. Hooi represented Singapore in 2025 SEA Games and helped Singapore to retain a bronze medal in the Women's team event.

Hooi won her third women's singles title in the Singaporean National Badminton Championships in January 2026.

== Awards and recognitions ==
In recognition of her sporting achievements, Hooi has been supported under the Singapore Sports Excellence Scholarship (spexScholarship) since 2019. SpexScholarship is a program in Singapore that provides financial and programmatic support to athletes to excel in Major Games and to serve as role models for Singapore's youth.

Hooi received the 2021 Annabel Pennefather Award from the Community Foundation of Singapore. The award recognises young women who have excelled in sport and show commitment to their sport development.

== Achievements ==
=== BWF International Challenge/Series (3 titles, 1 runner-up) ===
The Continental Circuit of BWF tournaments has three levels: International Challenge (level 1), International Series (level 2) and Future Series (level 3), sanctioned by BWF since 2007.

Women's singles
| Year | Tournament | Opponent | Score | Result | Ref. |
|---|---|---|---|---|---|
| 2021 | Polish International | (India) Samiya Imad Farooqui | 21–11, 21–9 | (gold) Winner | |
| 2023 | Bendigo International | (Australia) Ying Tse | 21–7, 21–5 | (gold) Winner | |
| 2023 | Sydney International | (New Zealand) Shaunna Li | 21–17, 21–17 | (gold) Winner | |
| 2024 | North Harbour International | (Chinese Taipei) Tsai Hsin-pei | 18–21, 13–21 | (silver) Runner-up | |

BWF International Challenge tournament
BWF International Series tournament

=== BWF Junior International (1 title, 2 runners-up) ===
Girls' singles
| Year | Tournament | Opponent | Score | Result | Ref. |
|---|---|---|---|---|---|
| 2016 | Singapore Youth International | (Japan) Atsumi Miyazaki | 21–12, 21–14 | (gold) Winner | |
| 2017 | Jaya Raya Junior International | (Thailand) Pattarasuda Chaiwan | 20–22, 12-21 | (silver) Runner-up | |

Girls' doubles
| Year | Tournament | Partner | Opponent | Score | Result | Ref. |
|---|---|---|---|---|---|---|
| 2016 | Singapore Youth International | (Singapore) Jia Rong Sito | (Japan) Atsumi Miyazaki (Japan) Hinata Suzuki | 19–21, 21–13, 20–22 | (silver) Runner-up | |

BWF Junior International Grand Prix tournament
BWF Junior International Series tournament
