= Zecily Fung =

Australian badminton player (born 2001)

Zecily Fung 冯咏琪
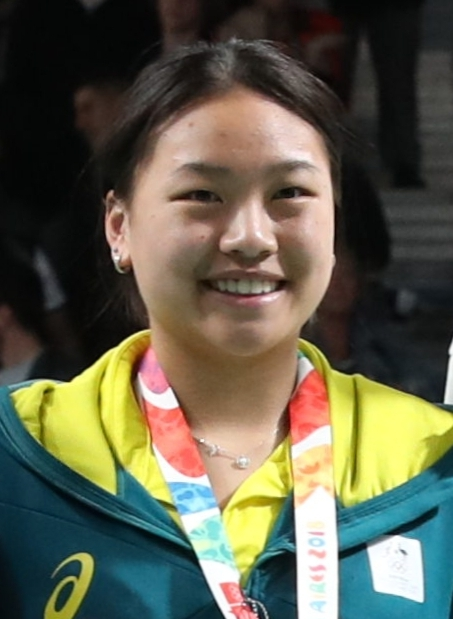
- Fung at the 2018 Summer Youth Olympics

Personal information
- Born: 1 October 2001 (age 24)

Sport
- Country: Australia
- Sport: Badminton

Women's singles
- Highest ranking: 187 (26 July 2018)
Medal record
Women's badminton
Representing Australia
Oceania Championships
Bronze medal – third place	2018 Hamilton	Women's singles
Oceania Junior Championships
Silver medal – second place	2017 Nouméa	Girls' doubles
Representing (International Olympic Committee) Mixed-NOCs
Youth Olympic Games
Bronze medal – third place	2018 Buenos Aires	Mixed team

Chinese name
- Traditional Chinese: 馮詠琪
- Simplified Chinese: 冯咏琪
Transcriptions
Standard Mandarin
- Hanyu Pinyin: Féng Yǒngqí
- IPA: [fə̌ŋ jʊ̀ŋ.tɕʰǐ]
Yue: Cantonese
- Jyutping: Fung4 Wing6-kei4
- IPA: [fʊŋ˩ wɪŋ˨.kʰej˩]

Zecily Fung (born 1 October 2001) is an Australian badminton player who competes in international level events. She was a bronze medalist at the 2018 Oceania Badminton Championships in Hamilton, New Zealand, she has also represented Australia at the 2018 BWF World Junior Championships and the 2018 Summer Youth Olympics where she won the bronze medal in the mixed team event.

At the age of 16, she was ranked the number 1 junior in Oceania. Her parents are from Hong Kong.

== Achievements ==
=== Oceania Championships ===
Women's singles

Year	Venue	Opponent	Score	Result
2018	Eastlink Badminton Stadium, Hamilton, New Zealand	(Australia) Louisa Ma	18–21, 12–21	Bronze

=== Oceania Junior Championships ===
Girls' doubles

Year	Venue	Partner	Opponent	Score	Result
2017	Salle Anewy, Nouméa, New Caledonia	(Australia) Jodee Vega	(New Zealand) Sally Fu (New Zealand) Tamara Otene	20–22, 16–21	Silver
