= Léonice Huet =

French badminton player (born 2000)

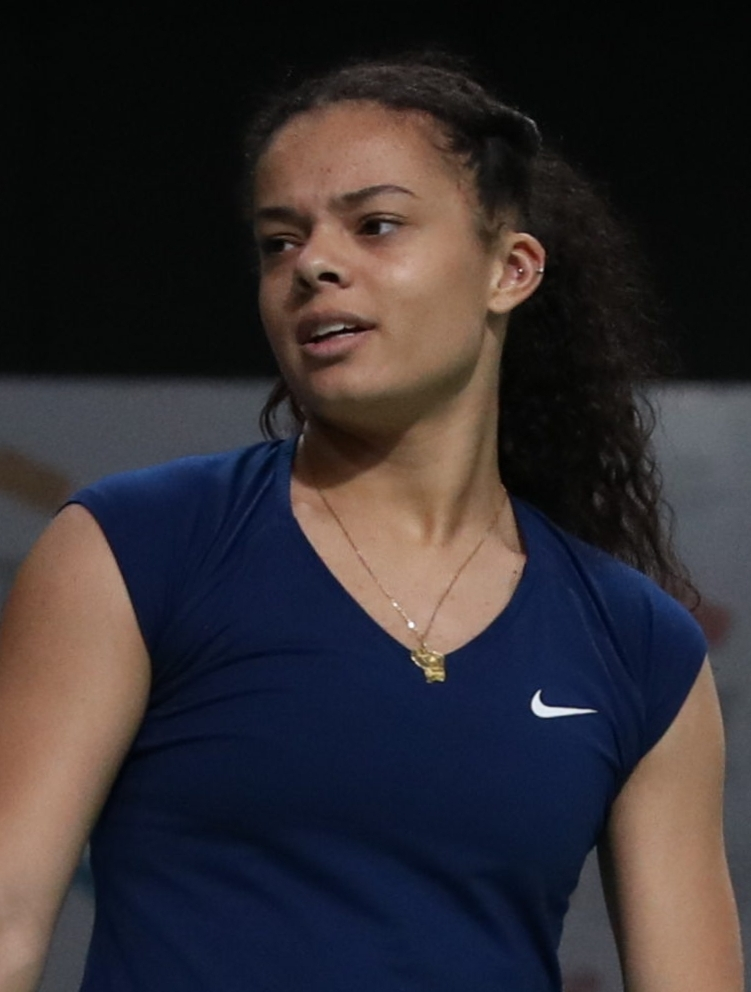
- Huet at the 2018 Summer Youth Olympics

Personal information
- Born: 21 May 2000 (age 26) Dieppe, Seine-Maritime, France
- Height: 1.67 m (5 ft 6 in)
- Weight: 65 kg (143 lb)

Sport
- Country: France
- Sport: Badminton
- Handedness: Right

Women's singles
- Highest ranking: 43 (27 September 2022)
- BWF profile
Medal record
Women's badminton
Representing France
European Women's Team Championships
Bronze medal – third place	2020 Liévin	Women's team
Bronze medal – third place	2024 Łódź	Women's team
European Mixed Team Championships
Silver medal – second place	2021 Vantaa	Mixed team
Silver medal – second place	2023 Aire-sur-la-Lys	Mixed team
Silver medal – second place	2025 Baku	Mixed team
European Junior Championships
Gold medal – first place	2017 Mulhouse	Mixed team
Gold medal – first place	2018 Tallinn	Mixed team
Mediterranean Games
Bronze medal – third place	2026 Taranto	Women's singles
Representing (International Olympic Committee) Mixed-NOCs
Youth Olympic Games
Silver medal – second place	2018 Buenos Aires	Mixed team

Léonice Huet (born 21 May 2000) is a French badminton player. Born in Dieppe, Seine-Maritime, she started her career in BadBonneval club, and in 2014 joined the CLT Orléans. She won her first senior international title at the 2016 Latvia International tournament in the mixed doubles event at the age of 16. Huet was part of the national junior team that won the mixed team title at the 2017 and 2018 European Junior Championships. She participated at the 2018 Summer Youth Olympics, helps the team Omega took the silver medal in the mixed team event.

== Achievements ==
=== BWF International Challenge/Series (3 titles, 3 runners-up) ===
Women's singles
Year	Tournament	Opponent	Score	Result
2019	Lithuanian International	(Scotland) Holly Newall	22–20, 21–10	(gold) Winner
2020	Portugal International	(Switzerland) Sabrina Jaquet	10–21, 11–21	(silver) Runner-up
2024	Swedish Open	(India) Devika Sihag	21–18, 14–21, 19–21	(silver) Runner-up
2025	Swedish Open	(Turkey) Neslihan Arın	14–21, 22–24	(silver) Runner-up
2026	Lithuanian International	(Croatia) Jelena Buchberger	21–15, 21–10	(gold) Winner

Mixed doubles
Year	Tournament	Partner	Opponent	Score	Result
2016	Latvia International	(France) Thom Gicquel	(Russia) Dmitrii Riabov (Russia) Maria Shegurova	21–15, 18–21, 21–15	(gold) Winner

BWF International Challenge tournament
BWF International Series tournament
BWF Future Series tournament
