= Ashwathi Pillai =

Swedish badminton player

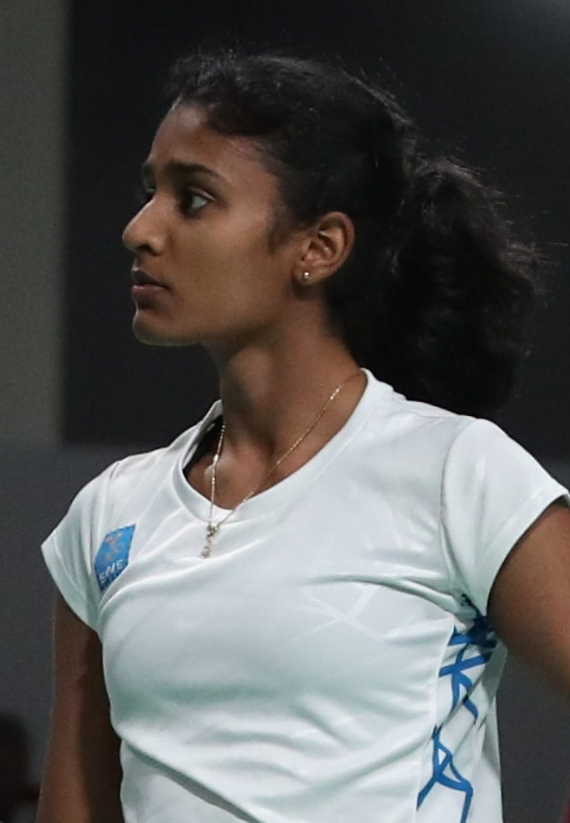
- Pillai at the 2018 Summer Youth Olympics

Personal information
- Born: Ashwathi Vinodh Pillai; 14 July 2000 (age 25) village near Thuckalay, Kanyakumari, Tamil Nadu, India
- Height: 172 cm (5 ft 8 in)
- Weight: 63 kg (139 lb)

Sport
- Country: Sweden
- Sport: Badminton
- Handedness: Right
- Coached by: Rio Willianto

Women's singles & doubles
- Highest ranking: 215 (WS 10 May 2018); 400 (WD 5 July 2018)
- BWF profile
Medal record
Women's badminton
Representing (International Olympic Committee) Mixed-NOCs
Youth Olympic Games
| Gold medal – first place | 2018 Buenos Aires | Mixed team |

Ashwathi Vinodh Pillai (born 14 July 2000) is a Swedish professional badminton player. She has participated in several national and international tournaments across Europe, and was part of the Alpha team which won the gold medal at the 2018 Summer Youth Olympics.

== Early life ==
Pillai was born to Gayathri and Vinod Pillai. She hails from a village near Thucklay in Kanyakumari, Tamil Nadu, India. She has one sibling, a brother. She studied at the National Public School, Bangalore, until class 4.

She was intrigued by badminton during her childhood as she watched her father play along with his friends. In 2009, the Pillai family moved to Sweden owing to her father's professional requirements. While in Sweden, she continued her schooling at Internationella Engelska Skolan. In her class 12, she studied math and biology. She takes inspiration from Carolina Marín, and is reported to admire actress Deepika Padukone.

== Career ==
Pillai started playing badminton at the age of seven. After moving to Sweden, she did not want to stop training. She entered the Täby badminton club under the coach Rio Willianto and joined the national training centre in Uppsala under the coach Anders Kristiansen. She is coached by Prakash Padukone at his academy in Bengaluru, India, for three weeks every year, and trained by Vimal Kumar and Yousaf Johari. She trains for at least three and a half hours a day, including training by physical trainers from Swedish National Sports Federation.

Pillai participated in several national and international tournaments such as European 8 Nations, Danish Junior International, Glasgow International Junior Championship, and Finnkampen in Helsinki. Later, Pillai was given admission into the National Sports Gymnasium for playing badminton.

Pillai's achievements at national and international tournaments is as follows:

- 2015 – Swedish national champion in U-15 category
- 2015 – Winner in singles at Swiss Junior Open
- 2016 – Runner-up in singles at Polish Junior International Championship
- 2017 – Made to quarterfinals of Bulgaria Open
- 2018 – Youngest-ever winner of the Swedish Senior National Championship (age 18)
- Youngest qualifier for the Swedish Elite class tournaments

== Awards and recognition ==
Pillai received the Prestigious Player of the Year award (Girls Junior) 2012–2013 in Stockholm with prize money. She also received a Bengt Erik Hoijers stipend for 2013 with prize money.
