= Vũ Thị Anh Thư =

Vietnamese badminton player (born 2001)

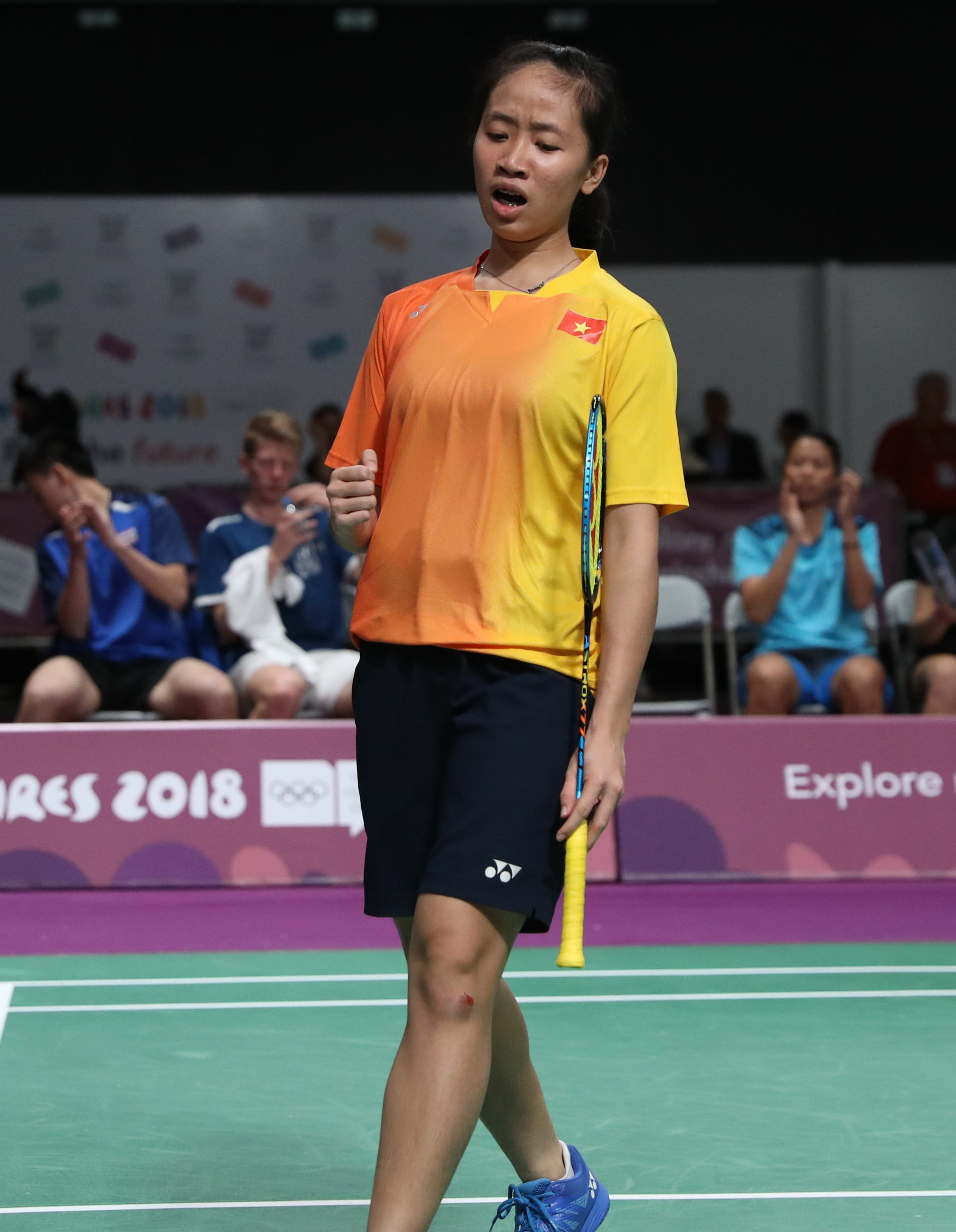
- Vu at the 2018 Summer Youth Olympics

Personal information
- Born: 16 July 2001 (age 25) Đồng Nai, Ho Chi Minh City, Vietnam

Sport
- Country: Vietnam
- Sport: Badminton
- Handedness: Left

Women's singles
- Highest ranking: 99 (20 June 2023)
- BWF profile
Medal record
Women's badminton
Representing Vietnam
SEA Games
| Bronze medal – third place | 2021 Vietnam | Women's team |
Representing (International Olympic Committee) Mixed-NOCs
Youth Olympic Games
| Silver medal – second place | 2018 Buenos Aires | Mixed team |

Vũ Thị Anh Thư (born 16 July 2001) is a Vietnamese badminton player. She won a silver medal in badminton at the 2018 Youth Olympics mixed team relay event. Vũ also helped the Vietnamese women's team to secure a bronze medal at the 2021 SEA Games when she delivered the last point for the team after defeating Ong Xin Yee of Malaysia.

== Career ==
Vũ started playing badminton at the age of 10. In 2011, she competed in the Vietnamese National Junior Badminton Championships and won a medal.

In 2022, she won a bronze medal at the 2021 SEA Games in the women's team event. In the following months, she won her first international title at the Croatia Open. Months later, she would win her second consecutive title at the Future Series Nouvelle-Aquitaine. In September, she reached the quarterfinals of the Vietnam Open.

== Achievements ==
=== BWF International Challenge/Series (2 titles) ===
Women's singles

| Year | Tournament | Opponent | Score | Result |
|---|---|---|---|---|
| 2022 | Croatia Open | (Hong Kong) Saloni Samirbhai Mehta | 21–9, 16–21, 21–14 | (gold) Winner |
| 2022 | Future Series Nouvelle-Aquitaine | (Switzerland) Milena Schnider | 21–17, 21–12 | (gold) Winner |

BWF International Challenge tournament
BWF International Series tournament
BWF Future Series tournament

=== BWF Junior International (1 runner-up) ===
Girls' singles

| Year | Tournament | Opponent | Score | Result |
|---|---|---|---|---|
| 2018 | Cyprus Junior International | (India) Purva Barve | 13–21, 9–21 | (silver) Runner-up |

BWF Junior International Grand Prix tournament
BWF Junior International Challenge tournament
BWF Junior International Series tournament
BWF Junior Future Series tournament
