= 2018 European Junior Badminton Championships – Teams event =

2018 European Junior Badminton Championships – Mixed team
- Venue: Kalev Sports Hall
- Location: Tallinn, Estonia
- Dates: 7 September 2018 – 11 September 2018
- Nations: 34

Medalists
gold medal	Denmark
silver medal	France
bronze medal	Germany
bronze medal	Russia

The mixed team tournament of the 2018 European Junior Badminton Championships was held from 7 to 11 September 2018.

== Tournament ==
=== Venue ===
This tournament was held at Kalev Sports Hall in Tallinn, Estonia.

=== Draw ===
The draw was announced on 2 August 2018.

Group 1	Group 2	Group 3	Group 4
Denmark; Bulgaria; Lithuania; Switzerland	Estonia; France; Sweden; Ukraine	England; Hungary; Portugal; Spain	Iceland; Latvia; Russia; Slovakia
Group 5	Group 6	Group 7	Group 8
Finland; Germany; Israel; Italy	Belgium; Czech Republic; Moldova; Norway	Austria; Cyprus; Ireland; Slovenia; Turkey	Croatia; Netherlands; Poland; Romania; Scotland

== Group stage ==
=== Group 1 ===
Pos	Team	Pld	W	L	MF	MA	MD	GF	GA	GD	PF	PA	PD	Pts	Qualification	Denmark	Bulgaria	Switzerland	Lithuania
1	Denmark	3	3	0	14	1	+13	29	3	+26	670	432	+238	3	Advance to knockout stage	—	4–1	5–0	5–0
2	Bulgaria	3	2	1	8	7	+1	16	18	−2	602	597	+5	2			—	3–2	4–1
3	Switzerland	3	1	2	7	8	−1	17	16	+1	592	574	+18	1				—	5–0
4	Lithuania	3	0	3	1	14	−13	3	28	−25	377	638	−261	0					—

Source: BWF

==== Denmark vs Switzerland ====
Denmark
5
Kalev Sports Hall, Court 5
7 September 2018, 10:00 UTC+2

Switzerland
0

			1	2	3
1	(Denmark) (Switzerland)	Magnus Johannesen; Nicolas Müller	21; 19	21; 15
2	(Denmark) (Switzerland)	Sophia Grundtvig; Milena Schnider	21; 11	20; 22	21; 17
3	(Denmark) (Switzerland)	Mads Muurholm / Mads Vestergaard; Yann Orteu / Minh Quang Pham	21; 12	21; 14
4	(Denmark) (Switzerland)	Christine Busch / Amalie Schulz; Julie Franconville / Dounia Pelupessy	21; 12	21; 14
5	(Denmark) (Switzerland)	Rasmus Espersen / Freja Ravn; Minh Quang Pham / Milena Schnider	21; 11	21; 17

==== Lithuania vs Bulgaria ====
Lithuania
1
Kalev Sports Hall, Court 6
7 September 2018, 10:00 UTC+2

Bulgaria
4

			1	2	3
1	(Lithuania) (Bulgaria)	Jonas Petkus / Gabija Mockutė; Iliyan Stoynov / Hristomira Popovska	15; 21	8; 21
2	(Lithuania) (Bulgaria)	Samanta Golubickaite; Maria Delcheva	4; 21	10; 21
3	(Lithuania) (Bulgaria)	Danielius Beržanskis; Iliyan Stoynov	13; 21	21; 18	11; 21
4	(Lithuania) (Bulgaria)	Gabija Mockutė / Vitalija Movšovič; Maria Delcheva / Hristomira Popovska	20; 22	8; 21
5	(Lithuania) (Bulgaria)	Laurynas Borusas / Jonas Petkus; Dimitar Nenchev / Stanislav Zlankov	21; 19	21; 9

==== Denmark vs Lithuania ====
Denmark
5
Kalev Sports Hall, Court 3
8 September 2018, 12:30 UTC+2

Lithuania
0

			1	2	3
1	(Denmark) (Lithuania)	Nicolaj Wolf; Jonas Petkus	21; 12	21; 8
2	(Denmark) (Lithuania)	Amalie Schulz; Vitalija Movšovič	21; 9	21; 15
3	(Denmark) (Lithuania)	Sebastian Grønbjerg / Mads Muurholm; Danielius Beržanskis / Laurynas Borusas	21; 10	21; 11
4	(Denmark) (Lithuania)	Amalie Magelund / Freja Ravn; Gabija Mockutė / Vitalija Movšovič	21; 6	21; 7
5	(Denmark) (Lithuania)	Mads Vestergaard / Christine Busch; Laurynas Borusas / Samanta Golubickaite	21; 6	21; 13

==== Switzerland vs Bulgaria ====
Switzerland
2
Kalev Sports Hall, Court 4
8 September 2018, 12:30 UTC+2

Bulgaria
3

			1	2	3
1	(Switzerland) (Bulgaria)	Nicolas Müller; Iliyan Stoynov	21; 15	21; 13
2	(Switzerland) (Bulgaria)	Milena Schnider; Maria Delcheva	15; 21	11; 21
3	(Switzerland) (Bulgaria)	Yann Orteu / Minh Quang Pham; Dimitar Nenchev / Stanislav Zlankov	21; 13	21; 13
4	(Switzerland) (Bulgaria)	Julie Franconville / Dounia Pelupessy; Maria Delcheva / Hristomira Popovska	21; 18	12; 21	19; 21
5	(Switzerland) (Bulgaria)	Minh Quang Pham / Milena Schnider; Hristomira Popovska / Iliyan Stoynov	17; 21	21; 18	15; 21

==== Denmark vs Bulgaria ====
Denmark
4
Kalev Sports Hall, Court 1
9 September 2018, 10:00 UTC+2

Bulgaria
1

			1	2	3
1	(Denmark) (Bulgaria)	Line Christophersen; Gergana Pavlova	21; 9	21; 13
2	(Denmark) (Bulgaria)	Mads Sørensen; Iliyan Stoynov	21; 13	29; 30	12; 21
3	(Denmark) (Bulgaria)	Christine Busch / Amalie Schulz; Maria Delcheva / Hristomira Popovska	21; 7	21; 14
4	(Denmark) (Bulgaria)	Rasmus Espersen / Mads Vestergaard; Dimitar Nenchev / Stanislav Zlankov	21; 17	21; 14
5	(Denmark) (Bulgaria)	Sebastian Grønbjerg / Amalie Magelund; Hristomira Popovska / Iliyan Stoynov	21; 19	21; 14

==== Switzerland vs Lithuania ====
Switzerland
5
Kalev Sports Hall, Court 2
9 September 2018, 10:00 UTC+2

Lithuania
0

			1	2	3
1	(Switzerland) (Lithuania)	Nicolas Müller / Indira Dickhäuser; Gabija Mockutė / Jonas Petkus	21; 10	24; 22
2	(Switzerland) (Lithuania)	Dounia Pelupessy; Samanta Golubickaite	21; 13	21; 4
3	(Switzerland) (Lithuania)	Nicolas Müller; Danielius Beržanskis	21; 9	21; 15
4	(Switzerland) (Lithuania)	Indira Dickhäuser / Milena Schnider; Gabija Mockutė / Vitalija Movšovič	21; 5	21; 16
5	(Switzerland) (Lithuania)	Yann Orteu / Minh Quang Pham; Laurynas Borusas / Jonas Petkus	21; 17	21; 17

=== Group 2 ===
Pos	Team	Pld	W	L	MF	MA	MD	GF	GA	GD	PF	PA	PD	Pts	Qualification	France	Sweden	Ukraine	Estonia
1	France	3	3	0	13	2	+11	27	5	+22	654	450	+204	3	Advance to knockout stage	—	3–2	5–0	5–0
2	Sweden	3	2	1	10	5	+5	22	13	+9	664	585	+79	2			—	3–2	5–0
3	Ukraine	3	1	2	6	9	−3	13	20	−7	558	627	−69	1				—	4–1
4	Estonia (H)	3	0	3	1	14	−13	4	28	−24	449	663	−214	0					—

Source: BWF
(H) Host

==== Estonia vs Sweden ====
Estonia
0
Kalev Sports Hall, Court 1
7 September 2018, 18:00 UTC+2

Sweden
5

			1	2	3
1	(Estonia) (Sweden)	Artur Ajupov / Ramona Üprus; Melker Z-Bexell / Tilda Sjöö	15; 21	16; 21
2	(Estonia) (Sweden)	Karl Kert; Colin Hammarberg	10; 21	12; 21
3	(Estonia) (Sweden)	Catlyn Kruus; Ashwathi Pillai	13; 21	11; 21
4	(Estonia) (Sweden)	Hans-Kristjan Pilve / Alexander Raudsepp; Joel Hansson / Melker Z-Bexell	14; 21	21; 19	10; 21
5	(Estonia) (Sweden)	Karina Kapanen / Victoria Korobova; Malena Norrman / Tilda Sjöö	13; 21	11; 21

==== France vs Ukraine ====
France
5
Kalev Sports Hall, Court 2
7 September 2018, 18:00 UTC+2

Ukraine
0

			1	2	3
1	(France) (Ukraine)	Fabien Delrue / Juliette Moinard; Ivan Medynskiy / Valeriya Rudakova	21; 18	21; 12
2	(France) (Ukraine)	Arnaud Merklé; Danylo Bosniuk	21; 10	21; 8
3	(France) (Ukraine)	Léonice Huet; Anastasiya Prozorova	21; 14	21; 10
4	(France) (Ukraine)	Fabien Delrue / William Villeger; Glib Beketov / Mykhaylo Makhnovskiy	21; 12	21; 12
5	(France) (Ukraine)	Léonice Huet / Juliette Moinard; Anastasiya Prozorova / Valeriya Rudakova	23; 21	21; 10

==== France vs Estonia ====
France
5
Kalev Sports Hall, Court 3
8 September 2018, 16:00 UTC+2

Estonia
0

			1	2	3
1	(France) (Estonia)	Christo Popov; Hans-Kristjan Pilve	21; 9	21; 13
2	(France) (Estonia)	Marion Le Turdu; Karina Kapanen	21; 12	21; 11
3	(France) (Estonia)	Maxime Briot / Kenji Lovang; Artur Ajupov / Alexander Raudsepp	21; 17	21; 8
4	(France) (Estonia)	Ainoa Desmons / Juliette Moinard; Catlyn Kruus / Ramona Üprus	21; 10	21; 23	21; 11
5	(France) (Estonia)	William Villeger / Sharone Bauer; Alexander Raudsepp / Victoria Korobova	21; 16	21; 12

==== Ukraine vs Sweden ====
Ukraine
2
Kalev Sports Hall, Court 4
8 September 2018, 16:00 UTC+2

Sweden
3

			1	2	3
1	(Ukraine) (Sweden)	Ivan Medynskiy / Valeriya Rudakova; Melker Z-Bexell / Tilda Sjöö	21; 18	16; 21	10; 21
2	(Ukraine) (Sweden)	Danylo Bosniuk; Colin Hammarberg	15; 21	15; 21
3	(Ukraine) (Sweden)	Anastasiya Prozorova; Ashwathi Pillai	22; 20	15; 21	21; 18
4	(Ukraine) (Sweden)	Glib Beketov / Mykhaylo Makhnovskiy; Joel Hansson / Melker Z-Bexell	16; 21	17; 21
5	(Ukraine) (Sweden)	Anastasiya Prozorova / Valeriya Rudakova; Malena Norrman / Tilda Sjöö	18; 21	21; 13	21; 17

==== France vs Sweden ====
France
3
Kalev Sports Hall, Court 1
9 September 2018, 14:00 UTC+2

Sweden
2

			1	2	3
1	(France) (Sweden)	Fabien Delrue / Juliette Moinard; Melker Z-Bexell / Tilda Sjöö	16; 21	21; 16	14; 21
2	(France) (Sweden)	Arnaud Merklé; Colin Hammarberg	21; 8	21; 10
3	(France) (Sweden)	Léonice Huet; Ashwathi Pillai	21; 18	21; 17
4	(France) (Sweden)	Fabien Delrue / William Villeger; Joel Hansson / Melker Z-Bexell	21; 18	21; 10
5	(France) (Sweden)	Léonice Huet / Juliette Moinard; Malena Norrman / Tilda Sjöö	18; 21	16; 21

==== Ukraine vs Estonia ====
Ukraine
4
Kalev Sports Hall, Court 2
9 September 2018, 14:00 UTC+2

Estonia
1

			1	2	3
1	(Ukraine) (Estonia)	Ivan Medynskiy; Karl Kert	19; 21	15; 21
2	(Ukraine) (Estonia)	Valeriya Rudakova; Catlyn Kruus	21; 9	21; 14
3	(Ukraine) (Estonia)	Glib Beketov / Mykhaylo Makhnovskiy; Hans-Kristjan Pilve / Alexander Raudsepp	21; 17	21; 11
4	(Ukraine) (Estonia)	Valyeriya Masaylo / Daria Poida; Karina Kapanen / Victoria Korobova	21; 16	22; 20
5	(Ukraine) (Estonia)	Mykhaylo Makhnovskiy / Anastasiya Prozorova; Artur Ajupov / Ramona Üprus	21; 19	21; 13

=== Group 3 ===
Pos	Team	Pld	W	L	MF	MA	MD	GF	GA	GD	PF	PA	PD	Pts	Qualification	England	Spain	Hungary	Portugal
1	England	3	3	0	14	1	+13	28	4	+24	652	429	+223	3	Advance to knockout stage	—	5–0	4–1	5–0
2	Spain	3	2	1	8	7	+1	18	17	+1	615	619	−4	2			—	3–2	5–0
3	Hungary	3	1	2	7	8	−1	16	17	−1	571	555	+16	1				—	4–1
4	Portugal	3	0	3	1	14	−13	4	28	−24	424	659	−235	0					—

Source: BWF

==== England vs Spain ====
England
5
Kalev Sports Hall, Court 1
7 September 2018, 14:00 UTC+2

Spain
0

			1	2	3
1	(England) (Spain)	Harry Huang; Tomás Toledano	21; 14	21; 15
2	(England) (Spain)	Freya Redfearn; Elena Andreu	21; 18	12; 21	21; 19
3	(England) (Spain)	William Jones / Ethan van Leeuwen; Joan Monroy / Carlos Piris	21; 9	21; 8
4	(England) (Spain)	Molly Chapman / Freya Redfearn; Elena Andreu / Ana Carbón	21; 14	22; 20
5	(England) (Spain)	Rory Easton / Hope Warner; Álvaro Leal / Laura Solis	21; 14	21; 14

==== Portugal vs Hungary ====
Portugal
1
Kalev Sports Hall, Court 2
7 September 2018, 14:00 UTC+2

Hungary
4

			1	2	3
1	(Portugal) (Hungary)	Cláudia Lourenço; Vivien Sándorházi	7; 21	9; 21
2	(Portugal) (Hungary)	Rui Tremoceiro; Balázs Pápai	14; 21	20; 22
3	(Portugal) (Hungary)	Mariana Afonso / Inês Pardilhó; Réka Madarász / Vivien Sándorházi	8; 21	6; 21
4	(Portugal) (Hungary)	Kevin Selvarajah / Rui Tremoceiro; Mate Balint / Zsombor Dulcz	21; 11	24; 22
5	(Portugal) (Hungary)	Tomás Coelho / Inês Pardilhó; Balázs Pápai / Réka Madarász	9; 21	16; 21

==== England vs Portugal ====
England
5
Kalev Sports Hall, Court 3
8 September 2018, 19:30 UTC+2

Portugal
0

			1	2	3
1	(England) (Portugal)	Zach Russ; João Chang	21; 7	21; 4
2	(England) (Portugal)	Pamela Reyes; Ana Fernandes	21; 14	21; 17
3	(England) (Portugal)	Rory Easton / Zach Russ; João Chang / Tomás Coelho	21; 8	21; 8
4	(England) (Portugal)	Sian Kelly / Hope Warner; Ana Fernandes / Cláudia Lourenço	21; 11	21; 13
5	(England) (Portugal)	William Jones / Asmita Chaudhari; Kevin Selvarajah / Mariana Afonso	21; 8	21; 6

==== Spain vs Hungary ====
Spain
3
Kalev Sports Hall, Court 4
8 September 2018, 19:30 UTC+2

Hungary
2

			1	2	3
1	(Spain) (Hungary)	Álvaro Leal / Laura Solis; Balázs Pápai / Réka Madarász	21; 13	12; 21	21; 17
2	(Spain) (Hungary)	Elena Andreu; Vivien Sándorházi	7; 21	11; 21
3	(Spain) (Hungary)	Tomás Toledano; Balázs Pápai	21; 16	21; 10
4	(Spain) (Hungary)	Nerea Díaz / Claudia Leal; Réka Madarász / Vivien Sándorházi	17; 21	21; 18	8; 21
5	(Spain) (Hungary)	Álvaro Leal / Miguel Sanluís; Máté Bálint / Zsombor Dulcz	21; 9	21; 14

==== England vs Hungary ====
England
4
Kalev Sports Hall, Court 5
9 September 2018, 18:00 UTC+2

Hungary
1

			1	2	3
1	(England) (Hungary)	Harry Huang; Balázs Pápai	21; 9	21; 10
2	(England) (Hungary)	Freya Redfearn; Réka Madarász	11; 21	17; 21
3	(England) (Hungary)	William Jones / Ethan van Leeuwen; Máté Bálint / Zsombor Dulcz	21; 11	21; 14
4	(England) (Hungary)	Molly Chapman / Freya Redfearn; Fanni Dóra Kiss / Kitti Szoták	21; 16	21; 12
5	(England) (Hungary)	Ethan van Leeuwen / Sian Kelly; Balázs Pápai / Vivien Sándorházi	21; 12	23; 25	21; 16

==== Spain vs Portugal ====
Spain
5
Kalev Sports Hall, Court 4
9 September 2018, 18:00 UTC+2

Portugal
0

			1	2	3
1	(Spain) (Portugal)	Miguel Sanluís; Rui Tremoceiro	20; 22	21; 14	21; 16
2	(Spain) (Portugal)	Nerea Díaz; Ana Fernandes	21; 15	15; 21	22; 20
3	(Spain) (Portugal)	Joan Monroy / Carlos Piris; Kevin Selvarajah / Rui Tremoceiro	21; 18	21; 11
4	(Spain) (Portugal)	Ana Carbón / Claudia Leal; Ana Fernandes / Cláudia Lourenço	21; 16	21; 13
5	(Spain) (Portugal)	Álvaro Leal / Laura Solis; Tomás Coelho / Inês Pardilhó	21; 8	22; 20

=== Group 4 ===
Pos	Team	Pld	W	L	MF	MA	MD	GF	GA	GD	PF	PA	PD	Pts	Qualification	Russia	Slovakia	Latvia	Iceland
1	Russia	3	3	0	15	0	+15	28	2	+26	623	335	+288	3	Advance to knockout stage	—	5–0	5–0	5–0
2	Slovakia	3	2	1	8	7	+1	19	12	+7	578	469	+109	2			—	3–2	5–0
3	Latvia	3	1	2	2	13	−11	4	26	−22	367	617	−250	1				—	3–2
4	Iceland	3	0	3	5	10	−5	10	21	−11	438	585	−147	0					—

Source: BWF

==== Russia vs Slovakia ====
Russia
5
Kalev Sports Hall, Court 5
7 September 2018, 14:00 UTC+2

Slovakia
0

			1	2	3
1	(Russia) (Slovakia)	Georgii Karpov / Anastasiia Kurdyukova; Jakub Horák / Mia Tarcalová				w/o
2	(Russia) (Slovakia)	Georgii Lebedev; Andrej Antoška	16; 21	24; 22	21; 7
3	(Russia) (Slovakia)	Anastasiia Pustinskaia; Alexandra Remeňová	21; 8	21; 11
4	(Russia) (Slovakia)	Dmitrii Klimenko / Vladimir Shipilenko; Andrej Antoška / Jakub Horák	16; 21	21; 15	21; 19
5	(Russia) (Slovakia)	Viktoriia Kozyreva / Mariia Sukhova; Mia Tarcalová / Lucia Vojteková	21; 14	21; 16

==== Latvia vs Iceland ====
Latvia
3
Kalev Sports Hall, Court 6
7 September 2018, 14:00 UTC+2

Iceland
2

			1	2	3
1	(Latvia) (Iceland)	Ardis Bedritis / Liāna Lenceviča; Eysteinn Högnason / Una Hrund Örvar	21; 16	21; 15
2	(Latvia) (Iceland)	Rihards Valters Blaubergs; Einar Sverrisson	21; 23	13; 21
3	(Latvia) (Iceland)	Una Berga; Þórunn Eylands	21; 15	21; 14
4	(Latvia) (Iceland)	Ardis Bedritis / Rihards Valters Blaubergs; Brynjar Már Ellertsson / Eysteinn Högnason	18; 21	18; 21
5	(Latvia) (Iceland)	Una Berga / Liāna Lenceviča; Þórunn Eylands / Halla María Gústafsdóttir	21; 5	21; 11

==== Russia vs Latvia ====
Russia
5
Kalev Sports Hall, Court 1
8 September 2018, 12:30 UTC+2

Latvia
0

			1	2	3
1	(Russia) (Latvia)	Dmitrii Klimenko / Anastasiia Kurdyukova; Ardis Bedritis / Liāna Lenceviča	21; 8	21; 10
2	(Russia) (Latvia)	Georgii Karpov; Edgars Vaivads	21; 4	21; 6
3	(Russia) (Latvia)	Anastasiia Pustinskaia; Diāna Stognija	21; 8	21; 11
4	(Russia) (Latvia)	Egor Kholkin / Georgii Lebedev; Ardis Bedritis / Rihards Valters Blaubergs	21; 10	21; 6
5	(Russia) (Latvia)	Viktoriia Kozyreva / Mariia Sukhova; Una Berga / Liāna Lenceviča	21; 17	21; 14

==== Slovakia vs Iceland ====
Slovakia
5
Kalev Sports Hall, Court 2
8 September 2018, 12:30 UTC+2

Iceland
0

			1	2	3
1	(Slovakia) (Iceland)	Andrej Antoška / Alexandra Remeňová; Einar Sverrisson / Þórunn Eylands	21; 14	21; 18
2	(Slovakia) (Iceland)	Jakub Horák; Brynjar Már Ellertsson	21; 9	21; 7
3	(Slovakia) (Iceland)	Mia Tarcalová; Þórunn Eylands	22; 20	21; 18
4	(Slovakia) (Iceland)	Andrej Antoška / Jakub Horák; Eysteinn Högnason / Einar Sverrisson	21; 14	21; 10
5	(Slovakia) (Iceland)	Alexandra Remeňová / Mia Tarcalová; Halla María Gústafsdóttir / Una Hrund Örvar	21; 1	21; 7

==== Russia vs Iceland ====
Russia
5
Kalev Sports Hall, Court 5
9 September 2018, 10:00 UTC+2

Iceland
0

			1	2	3
1	(Russia) (Iceland)	Amir Khamidulin; Einar Sverrisson	21; 8	21; 8
2	(Russia) (Iceland)	Anastasiia Shapovalova; Þórunn Eylands	21; 8	21; 5
3	(Russia) (Iceland)	Dmitrii Klimenko / Vladimir Shipilenko; Brynjar Már Ellertsson / Eysteinn Högnason	21; 8	21; 8
4	(Russia) (Iceland)	Viktoriia Kozyreva / Mariia Sukhova; Halla María Gústafsdóttir / Una Hrund Örvar	21; 6	21; 10
5	(Russia) (Iceland)	Egor Kholkin / Anastasiia Kurdyukova; Eysteinn Högnason / Þórunn Eylands	21; 15	21; 11

==== Slovakia vs Latvia ====
Slovakia
3
Kalev Sports Hall, Court 6
9 September 2018, 10:00 UTC+2

Latvia
2

			1	2	3
1	(Slovakia) (Latvia)	Jakub Horák / Mia Tarcalová; Ardis Bedritis / Liāna Lenceviča	21; 14	21; 8
2	(Slovakia) (Latvia)	Andrej Antoška; Edgars Vaivads	21; 2	21; 6
3	(Slovakia) (Latvia)	Alexandra Remeňová; Una Berga	21; 15	13; 21	16; 21
4	(Slovakia) (Latvia)	Andrej Antoška / Jakub Horák; Ardis Bedritis / Rihards Valters Blaubergs	21; 8	21; 11
5	(Slovakia) (Latvia)	Alexandra Remeňová / Mia Tarcalová; Una Berga / Liāna Lenceviča	19; 21	18; 21

=== Group 5 ===
Pos	Team	Pld	W	L	MF	MA	MD	GF	GA	GD	PF	PA	PD	Pts	Qualification	Germany	Italy	Finland	Israel
1	Germany	3	3	0	15	0	+15	30	2	+28	663	463	+200	3	Advance to knockout stage	—	5–0	5–0	5–0
2	Italy	3	2	1	9	6	+3	17	18	−1	655	659	−4	2			—	4–1	5–0
3	Finland	3	1	2	6	9	−3	16	16	0	601	593	+8	1				—	5–0
4	Israel	3	0	3	0	15	−15	3	30	−27	480	684	−204	0					—

Source: BWF

==== Germany vs Israel ====
Germany
5
Kalev Sports Hall, Court 3
7 September 2018, 18:00 UTC+2

Israel
0

			1	2	3
1	(Germany) (Israel)	Miranda Wilson; Heli Neiman	21; 18	21; 8
2	(Germany) (Israel)	Brian Holtschke; May Bar Netzer	21; 15	21; 15
3	(Germany) (Israel)	Emma Moszczynski / Jule Petrikowski; Yuval Pugach / Shery Rotshtien	21; 15	21; 17
4	(Germany) (Israel)	Matthias Kicklitz / Lukas Resch; May Bar Netzer / Rotem Mogilner	21; 12	21; 9
5	(Germany) (Israel)	Aaron Sonnenschein / Leona Michalski; Maxim Grinblat / Yuval Pugach	21; 16	21; 14

==== Finland vs Italy ====
Finland
1
Kalev Sports Hall, Court 4
7 September 2018, 18:00 UTC+2

Italy
4

			1	2	3
1	(Finland) (Italy)	Joakim Oldorff / Iina Suutarinen; Enrico Baroni / Chiara Passeri	21; 15	21; 14
2	(Finland) (Italy)	Maija Krzywacki; Katharina Fink	21; 7	11; 21	9; 21
3	(Finland) (Italy)	Joakim Oldorff; Giovanni Toti	17; 21	21; 18	18; 21
4	(Finland) (Italy)	Maija Krzywacki / Iina Suutarinen; Judith Mair / Lisa Sagmeister	21; 10	20; 22	13; 21
5	(Finland) (Italy)	Eero Lauri / Victor Lindahl; Enrico Baroni / Giovanni Toti	18; 21	14; 21

==== Germany vs Finland ====
Germany
5
Kalev Sports Hall, Court 1
8 September 2018, 16:00 UTC+2

Finland
0

			1	2	3
1	(Germany) (Finland)	Emma Moszczynski / Lukas Resch; Joakim Oldorff / Iina Suutarinen	21; 12	21; 17
2	(Germany) (Finland)	Ann-Kathrin Spöri; Julia Salonen	21; 12	21; 11
3	(Germany) (Finland)	Brian Holtschke; Joakim Oldorff	16; 21	21; 13	24; 22
4	(Germany) (Finland)	Emma Moszczynski / Jule Petrikowski; Maija Krzywacki / Iina Suutarinen	21; 17	21; 11
5	(Germany) (Finland)	Matthias Kicklitz / Lukas Resch; Eero Lauri / Victor Lindahl	21; 15	21; 15

==== Israel vs Italy ====
Israel
0
Kalev Sports Hall, Court 2
8 September 2018, 16:00 UTC+2

Italy
5

			1	2	3
1	(Israel) (Italy)	Maxim Grinblat; Enrico Baroni	14; 21	20; 22
2	(Israel) (Italy)	Yuval Pugach; Judith Mair	21; 19	17; 21	15; 21
3	(Israel) (Italy)	May Bar Netzer / Maxim Grinblat; Enrico Baroni / Giovanni Toti	11; 21	21; 16	15; 21
4	(Israel) (Italy)	Heli Neiman / Shery Rotshtien; Judith Mair / Lisa Sagmeister	21; 18	12; 21	13; 21
5	(Israel) (Italy)	May Bar Netzer / Yuval Pugach; Martina Corsini / Giovanni Toti	16; 21	14; 21

==== Germany vs Italy ====
Germany
5
Kalev Sports Hall, Court 3
9 September 2018, 14:00 UTC+2

Italy
0

			1	2	3
1	(Germany) (Italy)	Lukas Resch; Enrico Baroni	21; 11	21; 16
2	(Germany) (Italy)	Miranda Wilson; Katharina Fink	14; 21	21; 13	21; 13
3	(Germany) (Italy)	Matthias Kicklitz / Lukas Resch; Enrico Baroni / Giovanni Toti	21; 14	21; 18
4	(Germany) (Italy)	Maria Kuse / Leona Michalski; Judith Mair / Lisa Sagmeister	21; 13	21; 12
5	(Germany) (Italy)	Matthias Kicklitz / Emma Moszczynski; Martina Corsini / Giovanni Toti	21; 15	21; 12

==== Israel vs Finland ====
Israel
0
Kalev Sports Hall, Court 4
9 September 2018, 14:00 UTC+2

Finland
5

			1	2	3
1	(Israel) (Finland)	Heli Neiman; Julia Salonen	15; 21	13; 21
2	(Israel) (Finland)	Maxim Grinblat; Joakim Oldorff	13; 21	13; 21
3	(Israel) (Finland)	Yuval Pugach / Shery Rotshtien; Jannica Monnberg / Iina Suutarinen	8; 21	16; 21
4	(Israel) (Finland)	May Bar Netzer / Maxim Grinblat; Eero Lauri / Victor Lindahl	18; 21	18; 21
5	(Israel) (Finland)	Rotem Mogilner / Shery Rotshtien; Joakim Oldorff / Iina Suutarinen	10; 21	7; 21

=== Group 6 ===
Pos	Team	Pld	W	L	MF	MA	MD	GF	GA	GD	PF	PA	PD	Pts	Qualification	Czech Republic	Belgium	Moldova	Norway
1	Czech Republic	3	3	0	10	5	+5	23	13	+10	685	587	+98	3	Advance to knockout stage	—	3–2	3–2	4–1
2	Belgium	3	1	2	7	8	−1	16	16	0	568	573	−5	1			—	3–2	3–2
3	Moldova	3	1	2	7	8	−1	18	18	0	653	633	+20	1				—	3–2
4	Norway	3	1	2	6	9	−3	11	21	−10	499	612	−113	1					—

Source: BWF

==== Czech Republic vs Moldova ====
Czech Republic
3
Kalev Sports Hall, Court 3
7 September 2018, 14:00 UTC+2

Moldova
2

			1	2	3
1	(Czech Republic) (Moldova)	Tomáš Švejda / Lucie Krpatová; Cristian Savin / Vlada Ginga	15; 21	21; 18	22; 24
2	(Czech Republic) (Moldova)	Tereza Švábíková; Elena-Alexandra Diordiev	21; 12	16; 21	21; 12
3	(Czech Republic) (Moldova)	Jiří Král; Cristian Savin	19; 21	10; 21
4	(Czech Republic) (Moldova)	Tereza Švábíková / Kateřina Zuzáková; Elena-Alexandra Diordiev / Vlada Ginga	21; 16	20; 22	21; 11
5	(Czech Republic) (Moldova)	Jan Janoštík / Tomáš Švejda; Piotr Cunev / Ivan Skurikhin	21; 13	21; 12

==== Belgium vs Norway ====
Belgium
2
Kalev Sports Hall, Court 4
7 September 2018, 14:00 UTC+2

Norway
3

			1	2	3
1	(Belgium) (Norway)	Julien Carraggi; Markus Barth	18; 21	21; 14	21; 10
2	(Belgium) (Norway)	Joke de Langhe; Vera Ellingsen	16; 18			retired
3	(Belgium) (Norway)	Julien Carraggi / Jona van Nieuwkerke; Jonas Østhassel / Ludvig Smith-Meyer	21; 15	21; 13
4	(Belgium) (Norway)	Kirstin Boonen / Clara Lassaux; Sofia Macsali / Emilia Petersen Norberg	22; 20	14; 21	13; 21
5	(Belgium) (Norway)	Jona van Nieuwkerke / Joke de Langhe; Jonas Østhassel / Emma Wåland				w/o

==== Czech Republic vs Belgium ====
Czech Republic
3
Kalev Sports Hall, Court 3
8 September 2018, 09:00 UTC+2

Belgium
2

			1	2	3
1	(Czech Republic) (Belgium)	Tomáš Švejda / Lucie Krpatová; Jona van Nieuwkerke / Clara Lassaux	8; 21	21; 18	21; 18
2	(Czech Republic) (Belgium)	Jiří Král; Julien Carraggi	15; 21	6; 21
3	(Czech Republic) (Belgium)	Tereza Švábíková; Kirstin Boonen	21; 8	21; 15
4	(Czech Republic) (Belgium)	Jan Janoštík / Tomáš Švejda; Julien Carraggi / Jona van Nieuwkerke	21; 23	21; 19	19; 21
5	(Czech Republic) (Belgium)	Tereza Švábíková / Kateřina Zuzáková; Kirstin Boonen / Clara Lassaux	21; 9	21; 14

==== Moldova vs Norway ====
Moldova
3
Kalev Sports Hall, Court 4
8 September 2018, 09:00 UTC+2

Norway
2

			1	2	3
1	(Moldova) (Norway)	Cristian Savin; Markus Barth	22; 20	21; 16
2	(Moldova) (Norway)	Vlada Ginga; Vera Ellingsen	21; 12	21; 6
3	(Moldova) (Norway)	Piotr Cunev / Ivan Skurikhin; Jonas Østhassel / Ludvig Smith-Meyer	14; 21	21; 17	11; 21
4	(Moldova) (Norway)	Anna Cernetchi / Elena-Alexandra Diordiev; Sofia Macsali / Emilia Petersen Norberg	15; 21	18; 21
5	(Moldova) (Norway)	Vlada Ginga / Cristian Savin; Jonas Østhassel / Emma Wåland	19; 21	21; 10	21; 5

==== Czech Republic vs Norway ====
Czech Republic
4
Kalev Sports Hall, Court 1
9 September 2018, 18:00 UTC+2

Norway
1

			1	2	3
1	(Czech Republic) (Norway)	Jan Janoštík; Markus Barth	17; 21	21; 7	14; 21
2	(Czech Republic) (Norway)	Tereza Švábíková; Vera Ellingsen	21; 8	21; 18
3	(Czech Republic) (Norway)	Jan Janoštík / Tomáš Švejda; Jonas Østhassel / Ludvig Smith-Meyer	21; 12	21; 13
4	(Czech Republic) (Norway)	Tereza Švábíková / Kateřina Zuzáková; Sofia Macsali / Emilia Petersen Norberg	21; 12	21; 18
5	(Czech Republic) (Norway)	Tomáš Švejda / Lucie Krpatová; Jonas Østhassel / Emma Wåland	21; 10	21; 15

==== Moldova vs Belgium ====
Moldova
2
Kalev Sports Hall, Court 2
9 September 2018, 18:00 UTC+2

Belgium
3

			1	2	3
1	(Moldova) (Belgium)	Vlada Ginga; Clara Lassaux	21; 19	21; 12
2	(Moldova) (Belgium)	Piotr Cunev; Senne Houthoofd	16; 21	18; 21
3	(Moldova) (Belgium)	Anna Cernetchi / Vlada Ginga; Kirstin Boonen / Clara Lassaux	21; 16	16; 21	18; 21
4	(Moldova) (Belgium)	Piotr Cunev / Ivan Skurikhin; Julien Carraggi / Jona van Nieuwkerke	17; 21	14; 21
5	(Moldova) (Belgium)	Anna Cernetchi / Cristian Savin; Kirstin Boonen / Senne Houthoofd	21; 13	21; 7

=== Group 7 ===
Pos	Team	Pld	W	L	MF	MA	MD	GF	GA	GD	PF	PA	PD	Pts	Qualification	Turkey	Austria	Ireland	Slovenia	Cyprus
1	Turkey	4	4	0	18	2	+16	38	6	+32	917	618	+299	4	Advance to knockout stage	—	4–1	4–1	5–0	5–0
2	Austria	4	3	1	14	6	+8	29	14	+15	816	720	+96	3			—	5–0	3–2	5–0
3	Ireland	4	2	2	9	11	−2	19	25	−6	737	814	−77	2				—	4–1	4–1
4	Slovenia	4	1	3	7	13	−6	17	27	−10	782	803	−21	1					—	4–1
5	Cyprus	4	0	4	2	18	−16	5	36	−31	545	842	−297	0						—

Source: BWF

==== Turkey vs Cyprus ====
Turkey
5
Kalev Sports Hall, Court 3
7 September 2018, 10:00 UTC+2

Cyprus
0

			1	2	3
1	(Turkey) (Cyprus)	Semih Baha Başakın / Bengisu Erçetin; Orestis Pissis / Ioanna Pissi	21; 7	21; 5
2	(Turkey) (Cyprus)	Hilmican Şimşek; Aris Kattirtzi	21; 12	21; 15
3	(Turkey) (Cyprus)	Betül Soner; Anastasia Zintsidou	21; 10	21; 12
4	(Turkey) (Cyprus)	Semih Baha Başakın / Serkan Uğurlu; Constantinos Hadjigeorgiou / Orestis Pissis	21; 16	21; 12
5	(Turkey) (Cyprus)	Bengisu Erçetin / Nazlıcan İnci; Ioanna Pissi / Anastasia Zintsidou	21; 16	21; 7

==== Ireland vs Slovenia ====
Ireland
4
Kalev Sports Hall, Court 4
7 September 2018, 10:00 UTC+2

Slovenia
1

			1	2	3
1	(Republic of Ireland) (Slovenia)	Adam McAllister; Ian Spiller	21; 17	21; 10
2	(Republic of Ireland) (Slovenia)	Rachael Woods; Petra Polanc	15; 21	13; 21
3	(Republic of Ireland) (Slovenia)	Mark Kinnerk / Brian O'Mahony; Klemen Lesničar / Domen Lonzarič	10; 21	21; 19	24; 22
4	(Republic of Ireland) (Slovenia)	Orla Flynn / Alexandra Troy; Nike Brajkovič / Maruša Vračar	21; 17	21; 10
5	(Republic of Ireland) (Slovenia)	Adam McAllister / Rachael Woods; Ian Spiller / Petra Polanc	21; 18	21; 18

==== Turkey vs Ireland ====
Turkey
4
Kalev Sports Hall, Court 5
7 September 2018, 18:00 UTC+2

Ireland
1

			1	2	3
1	(Turkey) (Republic of Ireland)	Semih Baha Başakın / Bengisu Erçetin; Brian O'Mahony / Alexandra Troy	21; 12	21; 11
2	(Turkey) (Republic of Ireland)	Sezgin Kelebek; Adam McAllister	21; 11	21; 16
3	(Turkey) (Republic of Ireland)	Zehra Erdem; Orla Flynn	21; 6	21; 13
4	(Turkey) (Republic of Ireland)	Semih Baha Başakın / Serkan Uğurlu; Adam McAllister / Brian O'Mahony	21; 10	20; 22	21; 23
5	(Turkey) (Republic of Ireland)	Bengisu Erçetin / Nazlıcan İnci; Rachael Woods / Rebecca Woods	21; 6	21; 13

==== Cyprus vs Austria ====
Cyprus
0
Kalev Sports Hall, Court 6
7 September 2018, 18:00 UTC+2

Austria
5

			1	2	3
1	(Cyprus) (Austria)	Orestis Pissis / Ioanna Pissi; Kilian Meusburger / Serena Au Yeong	20; 22	10; 21
2	(Cyprus) (Austria)	Savvas Hadjipantelis; Nicolas Rudolf	8; 21	7; 21
3	(Cyprus) (Austria)	Anastasia Zintsidou; Raphaela Winkler	19; 21	17; 21
4	(Cyprus) (Austria)	Constantinos Hadjigeorgiou / Orestis Pissis; Jannik Maczejka / Kilian Meusburger	11; 21	7; 21
5	(Cyprus) (Austria)	Ioanna Pissi / Anastasia Zintsidou; Serena Au Yeong / Sabrina Herbst	18; 21	12; 21

==== Turkey vs Slovenia ====
Turkey
5
Kalev Sports Hall, Court 5
8 September 2018, 12:30 UTC+2

Slovenia
0

			1	2	3
1	(Turkey) (Slovenia)	Semih Baha Başakın / Bengisu Erçetin; Klemen Lesničar / Nike Brajkovič	21; 8	21; 9
2	(Turkey) (Slovenia)	Hilmican Şimşek; Ian Spiller	21; 19	21; 19
3	(Turkey) (Slovenia)	Zehra Erdem; Petra Polanc	21; 23	21; 19	21; 19
4	(Turkey) (Slovenia)	Semih Baha Başakın / Serkan Uğurlu; Klemen Lesničar / Domen Lonzarič	15; 21	21; 17	21; 13
5	(Turkey) (Slovenia)	Bengisu Erçetin / Nazlıcan İnci; Nike Brajkovič / Petra Polanc	21; 14	21; 11

==== Ireland vs Austria ====
Ireland
0
Kalev Sports Hall, Court 6
8 September 2018, 12:30 UTC+2

Austria
5

			1	2	3
1	(Republic of Ireland) (Austria)	Rachael Woods; Raphaela Winkler	21; 12	14; 21	15; 21
2	(Republic of Ireland) (Austria)	Adam McAllister; Nicolas Rudolf	7; 21	12; 21
3	(Republic of Ireland) (Austria)	Orla Flynn / Alexandra Troy; Serena Au Yeong / Sabrina Herbst	13; 21	13; 21
4	(Republic of Ireland) (Austria)	Mark Kinnerk / Brian O'Mahony; Jannik Maczejka / Kilian Meusburger	19; 21	14; 21
5	(Republic of Ireland) (Austria)	Adam McAllister / Rachael Woods; Nicolas Rudolf / Serena Au Yeong	16; 21	17; 21

==== Cyprus vs Ireland ====
Cyprus
1
Kalev Sports Hall, Court 1
8 September 2018, 19:30 UTC+2

Ireland
4

			1	2	3
1	(Cyprus) (Republic of Ireland)	Constantinos Hadjigeorgiou / Eva Kattirtzi; Adam McAllister / Rachael Woods	11; 21	8; 21
2	(Cyprus) (Republic of Ireland)	Aris Kattirtzi; Nhat Nguyen	7; 21	7; 21
3	(Cyprus) (Republic of Ireland)	Anastasia Zintsidou; Rebecca Woods	21; 19	21; 15
4	(Cyprus) (Republic of Ireland)	Savvas Hadjipantelis / Orestis Pissis; Adam McAllister / Brian O'Mahony	19; 21	15; 21
5	(Cyprus) (Republic of Ireland)	Ioanna Pissi / Anastasia Zintsidou; Rachael Woods / Rebecca Woods	16; 21	21; 19	22; 24

==== Slovenia vs Austria ====
Slovenia
2
Kalev Sports Hall, Court 5
8 September 2018, 19:30 UTC+2

Austria
3

			1	2	3
1	(Slovenia) (Austria)	Ian Spiller; Nicolas Rudolf	12; 21	12; 21
2	(Slovenia) (Austria)	Petra Polanc; Raphaela Winkler	21; 14	21; 16
3	(Slovenia) (Austria)	Klemen Lesničar / Domen Lonzarič; Kilian Meusburger / Nicolas Rudolf	26; 28	19; 21
4	(Slovenia) (Austria)	Nike Brajkovič / Maruša Vračar; Serena Au Yeong / Sabrina Herbst	15; 21	10; 21
5	(Slovenia) (Austria)	Ian Spiller / Petra Polanc; Kilian Meusburger / Serena Au Yeong	21; 13	21; 23	21; 13

==== Turkey vs Austria ====
Turkey
4
Kalev Sports Hall, Court 5
9 September 2018, 14:00 UTC+2

Austria
1

			1	2	3
1	(Turkey) (Austria)	Semih Baha Başakın / Bengisu Erçetin; Nicolas Rudolf / Serena Au Yeong	21; 17	21; 23	19; 21
2	(Turkey) (Austria)	Zehra Erdem; Raphaela Winkler	21; 15	21; 10
3	(Turkey) (Austria)	Sezgin Kelebek; Nicolas Rudolf	23; 21	21; 18
4	(Turkey) (Austria)	Bengisu Erçetin / Nazlıcan İnci; Serena Au Yeong / Sabrina Herbst	21; 9	21; 6
5	(Turkey) (Austria)	Semih Baha Başakın / Serkan Uğurlu; Jannik Maczejka / Kilian Meusburger	21; 13	21; 18

==== Cyprus vs Slovenia ====
Cyprus
1
Kalev Sports Hall, Court Grano
9 September 2018, 14:00 UTC+2

Slovenia
4

			1	2	3
1	(Cyprus) (Slovenia)	Anastasia Zintsidou; Petra Polanc	11; 21	8; 21
2	(Cyprus) (Slovenia)	Aris Kattirtzi; Klemen Lesničar	14; 21	12; 21
3	(Cyprus) (Slovenia)	Ioanna Pissi / Anastasia Zintsidou; Nike Brajkovič / Marusa Vracar	21; 15	21; 14
4	(Cyprus) (Slovenia)	Savvas Hadjipantelis / Orestis Pissis; Klemen Lesničar / Domen Lonzarič	12; 21	11; 21
5	(Cyprus) (Slovenia)	Constantinos Hadjigeorgiou / Ioanna Pissi; Ian Spiller / Petra Polanc	10; 21	16; 21

=== Group 8 ===
Pos	Team	Pld	W	L	MF	MA	MD	GF	GA	GD	PF	PA	PD	Pts	Qualification	Scotland	Netherlands	Poland	Croatia	Romania
1	Scotland	4	4	0	17	3	+14	36	10	+26	927	653	+274	4	Advance to knockout stage	—	4–1	4–1	4–1	5–0
2	Netherlands	4	3	1	16	4	+12	34	8	+26	852	653	+199	3			—	5–0	5–0	5–0
3	Poland	4	2	2	9	11	−2	19	25	−6	738	803	−65	2				—	3–2	5–0
4	Croatia	4	1	3	6	14	−8	14	30	−16	706	858	−152	1					—	3–2
5	Romania	4	0	4	2	18	−16	7	37	−30	644	900	−256	0						—

Source: BWF

==== Scotland vs Croatia ====
Scotland
4
Kalev Sports Hall, Court 1
7 September 2018, 10:00 UTC+2

Croatia
1

			1	2	3
1	(Scotland) (Croatia)	Rachel Sugden; Ira Misir	21; 14	21; 9
2	(Scotland) (Croatia)	Christopher Grimley; Luka Ban	21; 11	17; 21	20; 22
3	(Scotland) (Croatia)	Lauren Middleton / Sarah Sidebottom; Ira Misir / Inga Sadaić	21; 17	21; 10
4	(Scotland) (Croatia)	Joshua Apiliga / Matthew Grimley; Luka Grubić / Josip Meglić	21; 5	21; 10
5	(Scotland) (Croatia)	Adam Pringle / Rachel Andrew; Luka Ban / Inga Sadaić	21; 12	21; 15

==== Poland vs Netherlands ====
Poland
0
Kalev Sports Hall, Court 2
7 September 2018, 10:00 UTC+2

Netherlands
5

			1	2	3
1	(Poland) (Netherlands)	Bartosz Gałązka / Karolina Szubert; Ties van der Lecq / Milou Lugters	17; 21	15; 21
2	(Poland) (Netherlands)	Michał Matysiak; Dennis Koppen	13; 21	11; 21
3	(Poland) (Netherlands)	Zuzanna Parysz; Amy Tan	14; 21	9; 21
4	(Poland) (Netherlands)	Szymon Stokfisz / Wiktor Trecki; Wessel van der Aar / Ties van der Lecq	10; 21	23; 25
5	(Poland) (Netherlands)	Magdalena Kulska / Zuzanna Parysz; Milou Lugters / Alyssa Tirtosentono	9; 21	14; 21

==== Scotland vs Poland ====
Scotland
4
Kalev Sports Hall, Court 1
8 September 2018, 09:00 UTC+2

Poland
1

			1	2	3
1	(Scotland) (Poland)	Adam Pringle / Rachel Andrew; Magdalena Kulska / Wiktor Trecki	21; 12	18; 21	21; 13
2	(Scotland) (Poland)	Christopher Grimley; Andrzej Niczyporuk	21; 9	21; 11
3	(Scotland) (Poland)	Rachel Sugden; Anna Duda	21; 11	21; 17
4	(Scotland) (Poland)	Matthew Grimley / Adam Pringle; Bartosz Gałązka / Maciej Matusz	21; 7	21; 10
5	(Scotland) (Poland)	Lauren Middleton / Sarah Sidebottom; Magdalena Kulska / Zuzanna Parysz	21; 12	15; 21	19; 21

==== Croatia vs Romania ====
Croatia
2
Kalev Sports Hall, Tallinn
8 September 2018, 9:00 UTC+2

Romania
3

			1	2	3
1	(Croatia) (Romania)	Josip Meglić / Ira Misir; Daniel Popescu / Loredana Lungu	21; 18	16; 21	16; 21
2	(Croatia) (Romania)	Luka Ban; Mihnea Crăciun	21; 9	21; 12
3	(Croatia) (Romania)	Inga Sadaić; Ioana Grecea	22; 20	21; 12
4	(Croatia) (Romania)	Luka Ban / Josip Meglić; Mihnea Crăciun / Daniel Popescu	21; 19	18; 21	21; 17
5	(Croatia) (Romania)	Ira Misir / Inga Sadaić; Maria-Alexandra Dutu / Ioana Grecea	15; 21	13; 21

==== Scotland vs Netherlands ====
Scotland
4
Kalev Sports Hall, Court 5
8 September 2018, 16:00 UTC+2

Netherlands
1

			1	2	3
1	(Scotland) (Netherlands)	Matthew Grimley / Rachel Andrew; Ties van der Lecq / Milou Lugters	24; 22	16; 21	21; 11
2	(Scotland) (Netherlands)	Christopher Grimley; Dennis Koppen	21; 13	21; 16
3	(Scotland) (Netherlands)	Rachel Sugden; Amy Tan	21; 17	17; 21	22; 20
4	(Scotland) (Netherlands)	Christopher Grimley / Matthew Grimley; Gijs Duijs / Brian Wassink	21; 11	21; 16
5	(Scotland) (Netherlands)	Lauren Middleton / Sarah Sidebottom; Milou Lugters / Alyssa Tirtosentono	10; 21	17; 21

==== Poland vs Romania ====
Poland
5
Kalev Sports Hall, Court 6
8 September 2018, 16:00 UTC+2

Romania
0

			1	2	3
1	(Poland) (Romania)	Zuzanna Parysz; Maria-Alexandra Dutu	21; 15	21; 14
2	(Poland) (Romania)	Patryk Kordek; Daniel Popescu	18; 21	21; 11	21; 16
3	(Poland) (Romania)	Laura Bujak / Anna Duda; Loredana Lungu / Luiza Milu	21; 15	21; 13
4	(Poland) (Romania)	Szymon Stokfisz / Wiktor Trecki; Hincu Cosmin / Mihnea Crăciun	21; 12	21; 16
5	(Poland) (Romania)	Łukasz Cimosz / Dominika Kwaśnik; Daniel Popescu / Loredana Lungu	21; 13	21; 10

==== Croatia vs Poland ====
Croatia
2
Kalev Sports Hall, Court 3
9 September 2018, 10:00 UTC+2

Poland
3

			1	2	3
1	(Croatia) (Poland)	Josip Meglić / Ira Misir; Patryk Kordek / Dominika Kwaśnik	14; 21	11; 21
2	(Croatia) (Poland)	Luka Ban; Łukasz Cimosz	21; 16	21; 18
3	(Croatia) (Poland)	Inga Sadaić; Joanna Podedworny	25; 23	21; 16
4	(Croatia) (Poland)	Luka Ban / Josip Meglić; Szymon Stokfisz / Wiktor Trecki	13; 21	16; 21
5	(Croatia) (Poland)	Ira Misir / Inga Sadaić; Magdalena Kulska / Zuzanna Parysz	14; 21	21; 11	15; 21

==== Netherlands vs Romania ====
Netherlands
5
Kalev Sports Hall, Court 4
9 September 2018, 10:00 UTC+2

Romania
0

			1	2	3
1	(Netherlands) (Romania)	Wessel van der Aar / Alyssa Tirtosentono; Mihnea Crăciun / Luiza Milu	21; 18	21; 6
2	(Netherlands) (Romania)	Dennis Koppen; Daniel Popescu	21; 5	21; 10
3	(Netherlands) (Romania)	Amy Tan; Maria-Alexandra Dutu	22; 20	21; 18
4	(Netherlands) (Romania)	Gijs Duijs / Brian Wassink; Hincu Cosmin / Mihnea Crăciun	21; 11	27; 25
5	(Netherlands) (Romania)	Milou Lugters / Alyssa Tirtosentono; Maria-Alexandra Dutu / Ioana Grecea	21; 11	22; 20

==== Scotland vs Romania ====
Scotland
5
Kalev Sports Hall, Court 3
9 September 2018, 18:00 UTC+2

Romania
0

			1	2	3
1	(Scotland) (Romania)	Lauren Middleton; Ioana Grecea	18; 21	21; 18	21; 17
2	(Scotland) (Romania)	Christopher Grimley; Hincu Cosmin	21; 12	21; 9
3	(Scotland) (Romania)	Rachel Andrew / Rachel Sugden; Loredana Lungu / Luiza Milu	21; 14	21; 9
4	(Scotland) (Romania)	Joshua Apiliga / Adam Pringle; Hincu Cosmin / Daniel Popescu	21; 5	21; 10
5	(Scotland) (Romania)	Matthew Grimley / Rachel Andrew; Mihnea Crăciun / Luiza Milu	21; 12	21; 5

==== Croatia vs Netherlands ====
Croatia
0
Kalev Sports Hall, Court 4
9 September 2018, 18:00 UTC+2

Netherlands
5

			1	2	3
1	(Croatia) (Netherlands)	Ira Misir; Amy Tan	11; 21	16; 21
2	(Croatia) (Netherlands)	Josip Meglić; Finn Achthoven	14; 21	18; 21
3	(Croatia) (Netherlands)	Ira Misir / Inga Sadaić; Milou Lugters / Alyssa Tirtosentono	13; 21	12; 21
4	(Croatia) (Netherlands)	Luka Grubić / Josip Meglić; Wessel van der Aar / Ties van der Lecq	16; 21	9; 21
5	(Croatia) (Netherlands)	Luka Ban / Inga Sadaić; Gijs Duijs / Madouc Linders	14; 21	19; 21

== Knockout stage ==
=== Bracket ===
Quarter-finals
Denmark	3
Scotland	1
England	1
Germany	3
Turkey	2
Russia	3
Czech Republic	1
France	3

Semi-finals
Denmark	3
Germany	1
Russia	0
France	3

Final
Denmark	3
France	2

=== Quarter-finals ===
==== Denmark vs Scotland ====
Denmark
3
Kalev Sports Hall, Court 1
10 September 2018, 11:00 UTC+2

Scotland
1

			1	2	3
1	(Denmark) (Scotland)	Magnus Johannesen; Christopher Grimley	16; 21	21; 19	21; 15
2	(Denmark) (Scotland)	Line Christophersen; Rachel Sugden	21; 11	21; 19
3	(Denmark) (Scotland)	Mads Muurholm / Mads Vestergaard; Christopher Grimley / Matthew Grimley	19; 21	28; 30
4	(Denmark) (Scotland)	Christine Busch / Freja Ravn; Lauren Middleton / Sarah Sidebottom	21; 15	21; 16
5	(Denmark) (Scotland)	Sebastian Grønbjerg / Amalie Magelund; Matthew Grimley / Rachel Andrew				not played

==== England vs Germany ====
England
3
Kalev Sports Hall, Court 2
10 September 2018, 11:00 UTC+2

Germany
1

			1	2	3
1	(England) (Germany)	Rory Easton / Hope Warner; Lukas Resch / Emma Moszczynski	22; 24	15; 21
2	(England) (Germany)	Pamela Reyes; Ann-Kathrin Spöri	18; 21	13; 21
3	(England) (Germany)	Harry Huang; Lukas Resch	21; 9	21; 14
4	(England) (Germany)	Molly Chapman / Freya Redfearn; Emma Moszczynski / Jule Petrikowski	8; 21	17; 21
5	(England) (Germany)	Rory Easton / Zach Russ; Matthias Kicklitz / Aaron Sonnenschein				not played

==== Turkey vs Russia ====
Turkey
2
Kalev Sports Hall, Court 3
10 September 2018, 11:00 UTC+2

Russia
3

			1	2	3
1	(Turkey) (Russia)	Semih Baha Başakın / Bengisu Erçetin; Georgii Karpov / Anastasiia Kurdyukova	26; 24	21; 13
2	(Turkey) (Russia)	Zehra Erdem; Anastasiia Pustinskaia	13; 21	15; 21
3	(Turkey) (Russia)	Sezgin Kelebek; Georgii Karpov	13; 21	10; 21
4	(Turkey) (Russia)	Bengisu Erçetin / Nazlıcan İnci; Viktoriia Kozyreva / Mariia Sukhova	21; 9	21; 13
5	(Turkey) (Russia)	Semih Baha Başakın / Serkan Uğurlu; Egor Kholkin / Georgii Lebedev	14; 21	3; 21

==== Czech Republic vs France ====
Czech Republic
1
Kalev Sports Hall, Court 4
10 September 2018, 11:00 UTC+2

France
3

			1	2	3
1	(Czech Republic) (France)	Tomáš Švejda / Lucie Krpatová; William Villeger / Ainoa Desmons	8; 21	21; 16	17; 21
2	(Czech Republic) (France)	Jan Janoštík; Arnaud Merklé	10; 21	11; 21
3	(Czech Republic) (France)	Tereza Švábíková; Léonice Huet	21; 19	21; 15
4	(Czech Republic) (France)	Jan Janoštík / Tomáš Švejda; Kenji Lovang / Christo Popov	14; 21	21; 18	10; 21
5	(Czech Republic) (France)	Lucie Krpatová / Kateřina Zuzáková; Léonice Huet / Juliette Moinard				not played

=== Semi-finals ===
==== Denmark vs Germany ====
Denmark
3
Kalev Sports Hall, Court 1
10 September 2018, 17:00 UTC+2

Germany
1

			1	2	3
1	(Denmark) (Germany)	Sebastian Grønbjerg / Amalie Magelund; Lukas Resch / Emma Moszczynski	23; 21	21; 15
2	(Denmark) (Germany)	Line Christophersen; Miranda Wilson	21; 13	21; 13
3	(Denmark) (Germany)	Magnus Johannesen; Lukas Resch	19; 21	21; 14	19; 21
4	(Denmark) (Germany)	Amalie Magelund / Freja Ravn; Emma Moszczynski / Jule Petrikowski	21; 12	21; 18
5	(Denmark) (Germany)	Rasmus Espersen / Sebastian Grønbjerg; Matthias Kicklitz / Aaron Sonnenschein				not played

==== Russia vs France ====
Russia
0
Kalev Sports Hall, Court 2
10 September 2018, 17:00 UTC+2

France
3

			1	2	3
1	(Russia) (France)	Anastasiia Shapovalova; Léonice Huet	21; 10	14; 21	15; 21
2	(Russia) (France)	Amir Khamidulin; Arnaud Merklé	9; 21	8; 21
3	(Russia) (France)	Viktoriia Kozyreva / Mariia Sukhova; Léonice Huet / Juliette Moinard	17; 21	13; 21
4	(Russia) (France)	Georgii Karpov / Georgii Lebedev; Kenji Lovang / William Villeger				not played
5	(Russia) (France)	Egor Kholkin / Anastasiia Shapovalova; Arnaud Merklé / Juliette Moinard				not played

=== Final ===
==== Denmark vs France ====
Denmark
3
Kalev Sports Hall, Court 1
11 September 2018, 10:00 UTC+2

France
2

			1	2	3
1	(Denmark) (France)	Sebastian Grønbjerg / Amalie Magelund; Arnaud Merklé / Juliette Moinard	20; 22	21; 14	19; 21
2	(Denmark) (France)	Line Christophersen; Léonice Huet	21; 13	21; 16
3	(Denmark) (France)	Magnus Johannesen; Arnaud Merklé	19; 21	8; 21
4	(Denmark) (France)	Amalie Magelund / Freja Ravn; Léonice Huet / Juliette Moinard	21; 13	21; 8
5	(Denmark) (France)	Sebastian Grønbjerg / Mads Vestergaard; Kenji Lovang / William Villeger	10; 21	9; 21
