= 2018 European Junior Badminton Championships – Girls' singles =

2018 European Junior Badminton Championships – Girls' Singles
Tournament details
- Dates: 11 – 16 September 2018
- Edition: 26
- Venue: Kalev Sports Hall
- Location: Tallinn, Estonia

The Girls' Singles tournament of the 2018 European Junior Badminton Championships was held from September 11–16. Julie Dawall Jakobsen from Denmark clinched this title in the last edition. Hungarian Reka Madarasz leads the seedings this year.

== Seeded ==
1. (Hungary) Reka Madarasz (semi-finals)
2. (Hungary) Vivien Sandorhazi (semi-finals)
3. (Denmark) Line Christophersen (champions)
4. (Russia) Anastasiia Pustinskaia (fourth round)
5. (Russia) Anastasiia Shapovalova (quarter-finals)
6. (Bulgaria) Maria Delcheva (quarter-finals)
7. (Czech Republic) Tereza Svabikova (quarter-finals)
8. (Slovenia) Petra Polanc (fourth round)
9. (Bulgaria) Hristomira Popovska (third round)
10. (Spain) Elena Andreu (fourth round)
11. (Moldova) Vlada Ginga (fourth round)
12. (Ukraine) Anastasiya Prozorova (fourth round)
13. (France) Léonice Huet (quarter-finals)
14. (Germany) Ann-Kathrin Spori (fourth round)
15. (Ukraine) Valeriya Rudakova (third round)
16. (Sweden) Ashwathi Pillai (third round)

== Draw ==
=== Finals ===
Quarterfinals
1 | (Hungary) Reka Madarasz | 21 | 21
6 | (Bulgaria) Maria Delcheva | 9 | 18
3 | (Denmark) Line Christophersen | 21 | 21
5 | (Russia) Anastasiia Shapovalova | 6 | 13
(Denmark) Amalie Schulz | 21 | 21
13 | (France) Léonice Huet | 14 | 15
7 | (Czech Republic) Tereza Svabikova | 25 | 7
2 | (Hungary) Vivien Sandorhazi | 27 | 21

Semifinals
1 | (Hungary) Reka Madarasz | 19 | 19
3 | (Denmark) Line Christophersen | 21 | 21
(Denmark) Amalie Schulz | 18 | 21 | 21
2 | (Hungary) Vivien Sandorhazi | 21 | 12 | 19

Final
3 | (Denmark) Line Christophersen | 21 | 21
(Denmark) Amalie Schulz | 12 | 15

=== Top half ===
==== Section 1 ====
First round
(England) F Redfearn | 21 | 15 | 21
(France) R Cloteaux-Foucault | 15 | 21 | 15

Second round
1 | (Hungary) R Madarasz | 21 | 21
(Israel) Y Pugach | 10 | 8
(Netherlands) M Linders | 19 | 13
(Scotland) R Sugden | 21 | 21
15 | (Ukraine) V Rudakova | 21 | 21
(Slovenia) N Brajkovic | 12 | 11
(Switzerland) M Schnider | 21 | 13 | 21
(England) F Redfearn | 17 | 21 | 13

Third round
1 | (Hungary) R Madarasz | 21 | 21
(Scotland) R Sugden | 18 | 10
15 | (Ukraine) V Rudakova | 19 | 11
(Switzerland) M Schnider | 21 | 21

Fourth round
1 | (Hungary) R Madarasz | 10 | 21 | 21
(Switzerland) M Schnider | 21 | 17 | 10

==== Section 2 ====
First round
(Republic of Ireland) R Woods | 15 | 13
(Sweden) M Norrman | 21 | 21
(Croatia) I Misir | 22 | 11 | 19
(Poland) A Duda | 20 | 21 | 21

Second round
6 | (Bulgaria) M Delcheva | 21 | 21
(Slovakia) A Remenova | 10 | 15
(Czech Republic) T S van Coppenolle | 17 | 13
(Sweden) M Norrman | 21 | 21
11 | (Moldova) V Ginga | 21 | 21
(Lithuania) S Golubickaite | 11 | 12
(Belgium) C Lassaux | 21 | 22
(Poland) A Duda | 13 | 20

Third round
6 | (Bulgaria) M Delcheva | 21 | 25
(Sweden) M Norrman | 16 | 23
11 | (Moldova) V Ginga | 21 | 21
(Belgium) C Lassaux | 11 | 9

Fourth round
6 | (Bulgaria) M Delcheva | 21 | 21
11 | (Moldova) V Ginga | 8 | 18

==== Section 3 ====
First round
(Romania) I Grecea | 11 | 16
(Wales) L Hart | 21 | 21

Second round
3 | (Denmark) L Christophersen | 21 | 21
(Estonia) K Kapanen | 9 | 9
(Turkey) Z Erdem | 21 | 23
(Poland) J Podedworny | 12 | 21
14 | (Germany) A-K Spori | 23 | 20 | 21
(Belarus) U Zakharava | 21 | 22 | 16
(France) M Le Turdu | 21 | 17 | 21
(Wales) L Hart | 19 | 21 | 15

Third round
3 | (Denmark) L Christophersen | 21 | 21
(Turkey) Z Erdem | 13 | 10
14 | (Germany) A-K Spori | 21 | 22
(France) M Le Turdu | 18 | 20

Fourth round
3 | (Denmark) L Christophersen | 21 | 21
14 | (Germany) A-K Spori | 7 | 7

==== Section 4 ====
First round
(Estonia) R Uprus | 21 | 16 | 18
(Portugal) C Lourenco | 13 | 21 | 21
(Italy) J Mair | 12 | 10
(Finland) J Salonen | 21 | 21

Second round
5 | (Russia) A Shapovalova | 21 | 21
(Norway) V Ellingsen | 15 | 7
(Iceland) H M Gustafsdottir | 7 | 6
(Portugal) C Lourenco | 21 | 21
10 | (Spain) E Andreu | 21 | 20 | 21
(Latvia) U Berga | 15 | 22 | 15
(Cyprus) I Pissi | 14 | 12
(Finland) J Salonen | 21 | 21

Third round
5 | (Russia) A Shapovalova | 21 | 21
(Portugal) C Lourenco | 10 | 9
10 | (Spain) E Andreu | 24 | 14 | 21
(Finland) J Salonen | 22 | 21 | 19

Fourth round
5 | (Russia) A Shapovalova | 21 | 21
10 | (Spain) E Andreu | 10 | 12

=== Bottom half ===
==== Section 5 ====
First round
(Slovakia) M Tarcalova | 20 | 19
(Denmark) A Schulz | 22 | 21
(Croatia) I Sadaic | 17 | 19
(Cyprus) A Zintsidou | 21 | 21

Second round
(Denmark) A Schulz | 21 | 21
(Israel) H Neiman | 14 | 13
(Scotland) L Middleton | 17 | 17
9 | (Bulgaria) H Popovska | 21 | 21
(Cyprus) A Zintsidou | 21 | 21
(Belgium) K Boonen | 17 | 13
(Austria) R Winkler | 12 | 14
8 | (Slovenia) P Polanc | 21 | 21

Third round
(Denmark) A Schulz | 21 | 21
9 | (Bulgaria) H Popovska | 19 | 13
(Cyprus) A Zintsidou | 13 | 12
8 | (Slovenia) P Polanc | 21 | 21

Fourth round
(Denmark) A Schulz | 21 | 21 | 21
8 | (Slovenia) P Polanc | 23 | 17 | 13

==== Section 6 ====
First round
(Switzerland) D Pelupessy | 9 | 18
(Germany) M Wilson | 21 | 21
(Estonia) C Kruus | 7 | 9
(Denmark) S Grundtvig | 21 | 21

Second round
(Germany) M Wilson | 21 | 22
(Lithuania) V Movsovic | 12 | 20
(Romania) M A Dutu | 11 | 17
13 | (France) L Huet | 21 | 21
(Denmark) S Grundtvig | 21 | 21
(Republic of Ireland) R Woods | 17 | 17
(Germany) T P Nguyen | 21 | 12 | 20
4 | (Russia) A Pustinskaia | 8 | 21 | 22

Third round
(Germany) M Wilson | 16 | 20
13 | (France) L Huet | 21 | 22
(Denmark) S Grundtvig | 12 | 8
4 | (Russia) A Pustinskaia | 21 | 21

Fourth round
13 | (France) L Huet | 21 | 21
4 | (Russia) A Pustinskaia | 16 | 16

==== Section 7 ====
First round
(Latvia) L Lencevica | 15 | 17
(Poland) Z Jankowska | 21 | 21
(Czech Republic) K Zuzakova | 18 | 21 | 21
(Finland) M Krzywacki | 21 | 10 | 19

Second round
(Poland) Z Jankowska | 11 | 7
(Netherlands) A Tan | 21 | 21
(Turkey) B Soner | 21 | 13 | 17
16 | (Sweden) A Pillai | 14 | 21 | 21
(Czech Republic) K Zuzakova | 22 | 14 | 21
(Spain) N Diaz | 20 | 21 | 14
(Russia) V Kozyreva | 18 | 18
7 | (Czech Republic) T Svabikova | 21 | 21

Third round
(Netherlands) A Tan | 21 | 21
16 | (Sweden) A Pillai | 10 | 14
(Czech Republic) K Zuzakova | 16 | 13
7 | (Czech Republic) T Svabikova | 21 | 21

Fourth round
(Netherlands) A Tan | 15 | 15
7 | (Czech Republic) T Svabikova | 21 | 21

==== Section 8 ====
First round
(Italy) K Fink | 21 | 21 | 21
(Portugal) A Fernandes | 23 | 11 | 18

Second round
(Italy) K Fink | 21 | 21
(Iceland) T Eylands | 10 | 11
(Moldova) E-A Diordiev | 11 | 17
12 | (Ukraine) A Prozorova | 21 | 21
(Greece) G Sotiriou | 20 | 21 | 21
(Norway) S Macsali | 22 | 10 | 14
(England) P Reyes | 15 | 14
2 | (Hungary) V Sandorhazi | 21 | 21

Third round
(Italy) K Fink | 21 | 21 | 17
12 | (Ukraine) A Prozorova | 8 | 23 | 21
(Greece) G Sotiriou | 10 | 17
2 | (Hungary) V Sandorhazi | 21 | 21

Fourth round
12 | (Ukraine) A Prozorova | 8 | 9
2 | (Hungary) V Sandorhazi | 21 | 21
