= 2017 European Junior Badminton Championships – Girls' singles =

2017 European Junior Badminton Championships – Girls' Singles
Tournament details
- Dates: 11 – 16 April 2017
- Edition: 26
- Venue: Centre Sportif Regional D’Alsace
- Location: Mulhouse, France

The Girls' Singles tournament of the 2017 European Junior Badminton Championships was held from April 11-16. Mia Blichfeldt from Denmark clinched this title in the last edition. Danish Julie Dawall Jakobsen leads the seedings this year.

== Seeded ==
1. (Denmark) Julie Dawall Jakobsen (champions)
2. (Spain) Clara Azurmendi (quarter-finals)
3. (Hungary) Reka Madarasz (third round)
4. (Russia) Anastasiia Semenova (third round)
5. (Spain) Sara Penalver (third round)
6. (France) Yaëlle Hoyaux (quarter-finals)
7. (Denmark) Irina Amalie Andersen (semi-finals)
8. (Hungary) Vivien Sandorhazi (quarter-finals)
9. (Czech Republic) Tereza Svabikova (quarter-finals)
10. (France) Leonice Huet (third round)
11. (France) Margot Lambert (third round)
12. (Ukraine) Maryna Ilyinskaya (finals)
13. (Poland) Wiktoria Dabczynska (second round)
14. (Germany) Yvonne Li (semi-finals)
15. (Czech Republic) Monika Svetnickova (third round)
16. (Scotland) Holly Newall (first round)

== Draw ==
=== Finals ===
Quarterfinals
1	(Denmark) Julie Dawall Jakobsen	21	21
8	(Hungary) Vivien Sandorhazi	19	7
14	(Germany) Yvonne Li	21	21
9	(Czech Republic) Tereza Svabikova	15	15
6	(France) Yaëlle Hoyaux	10	11
12	(Ukraine) Maryna Ilyinskaya	21	21
7	(Denmark) Irina Amalie Andersen	21	21
2	(Spain) Clara Azurmendi	16	18

Semifinals
1	(Denmark) Julie Dawall Jakobsen	21	13	21
14	(Germany) Yvonne Li	17	21	11
12	(Ukraine) Maryna Ilyinskaya	14	23	21
7	(Denmark) Irina Amalie Andersen	21	21	18

Final
1	(Denmark) Julie Dawall Jakobsen	21	21
12	(Ukraine) Maryna Ilyinskaya	8	17

=== Top half ===
==== Section 1 ====
First round
1	(Denmark) J D Jakobsen	21	21
(Russia) A Shapovalova	12	12
(Portugal) A Goncalves	16	12
(Belgium) C Lassaux	21	21
10	(France) L Huet	21	21
(Slovenia) N Arih	9	15
(Slovakia) M Tarcalova	21	21
(Belarus) M Viarbitskaya	18	15

Second round
1	(Denmark) J D Jakobsen	21	21
(Belgium) C Lassaux	14	5
10	(France) L Huet	21	21
(Slovakia) M Tarcalova	10	10

Third round
1	(Denmark) J D Jakobsen	21	21
10	(France) L Huet	15	19

==== Section 2 ====
First round
8	(Hungary) V Sandorhazi	22	20	21
(Netherlands) M Linders	20	22	4
(England) G King	19	21	19
(Poland) Z Glijer	21	18	21
11	(France) M Lambert	21	21
(Estonia) K-K Marran	13	19
(Sweden) E Karlsson	9	8
(Cyprus) E Christodoulou	21	21

Second round
8	(Hungary) V Sandorhazi	21	21
(Poland) Z Glijer	12	12
11	(France) M Lambert	21	21
(Cyprus) E Christodoulou	19	15

Third round
8	(Hungary) V Sandorhazi	16	21	21
11	(France) M Lambert	21	13	13

==== Section 3 ====
First round
4	(Russia) A Semenova	21	21
(Republic of Ireland) B Stephenson	10	10
(Bulgaria) M Delcheva	21	21
(Latvia) U Berga	19	11
14	(Germany) Y Li	21	21
(Austria) K Hochmeir	7	10
(Scotland) R Sugden	21	21
(Ukraine) V Rudakova	19	17

Second round
4	(Russia) A Semenova	21	19	24
(Bulgaria) M Delcheva	19	21	22
14	(Germany) Y Li	21	18	21
(Scotland) R Sugden	13	21	15

Third round
4	(Russia) A Semenova	18	21	19
14	(Germany) Y Li	21	17	21

==== Section 4 ====
First round
5	(Spain) S Penalver	21	21
(Switzerland) A Mueller	8	10
(Romania) I Grecea	21	21
(Finland) P Lindberg	7	17
9	(Czech Republic) T Svabikova	19	21	21
(Germany) A-K Spori	21	16	15
(Norway) V Ellingsen	17	19
(Turkey) B Unlu	21	21

Second round
5	(Spain) S Penalver	21	21
(Romania) I Grecea	19	9
9	(Czech Republic) T Svabikova	21	16	21
(Turkey) B Unlu	13	21	10

Third round
15	(Spain) S Penalver	21	19	15
9	(Czech Republic) T Svabikova	16	21	21

=== Bottom half ===
==== Section 5 ====
First round
(Estonia) M A Karjus	13	24	9
(Russia) A Pustinskaia	21	22	21
(Slovakia) K Vargova	13	14
13	(Poland) W Dabczynska	21	21
(Spain) N Diaz	13	22	24
(Netherlands) A Tirtosentono	21	20	22
(England) A Holden	23	18	16
6	(France) Y Hoyaux	21	21	21

Second round
(Russia) A Pustinskaia	21	21
13	(Poland) W Dabczynska	18	12
(Spain) N Diaz	5	13
6	(France) Y Hoyaux	21	21

Third round
(Russia) A Pustinskaia	17	18
6	(France) Y Hoyaux	21	21

==== Section 6 ====
First round
(Germany) M Wilson	21	21
(Belgium) J De Langhe	18	11
(Norway) E S Hamang	10	7
12	(Ukraine) M Ilyinskaya	21	21
(Armenia) G Mamajanyan	7	5
(Turkey) K Inal	21	21
(Bulgaria) M Neycheva	15	18
3	(Hungary) R Madarasz	21	21

Second round
(Germany) M Wilson	19	17
12	(Ukraine) M Ilyinskaya	21	21
(Turkey) K Inal	21	16	18
3	(Hungary) R Madarasz	19	21	21

Third round
12	(Ukraine) M Ilyinskaya	21	21
3	(Hungary) R Madarasz	8	15

==== Section 7 ====
First round
(Croatia) L Trgovac	14	17
(Latvia) L Lencevica	21	21
(Portugal) M Chang	13	15
15	(Slovakia) M Svetnickova	21	21
(Denmark) L Christophersen	24	21
(Turkey) A Demirbag	22	14
(Sweden) J Magnusson	21	13	17
7	(Denmark) I A Andersen	17	21	21

Second round
(Latvia) L Lencevica	15	13
15	(Slovakia) M Svetnickova	21	21
(Denmark) L Christophersen	15	21
7	(Denmark) I A Andersen	21	23

Third round
15	(Slovakia) M Svetnickova	12	16
7	(Denmark) I A Andersen	21	21

==== Section 8 ====
First round
(Finland) M Krzywacki	21	21
(Italy) S Garino	12	14
(Slovenia) P Polanc	14	3
16	(Scotland) H Newall	21	3^{r}
(Austria) N Herbst	12	9
(Republic of Ireland) K Frost	21	21
(Switzerland) J Stadelmann	16	4
2	(Spain) C Azurmendi	21	21

Second round
(Finland) M Krzywacki	14	21	21
(Slovenia) P Polanc	21	13	18
(Republic of Ireland) K Frost	11	9
2	(Spain) C Azurmendi	21	21

Third round
(Finland) M Krzywacki	11	11
2	(Spain) C Azurmendi	21	21
