= 2020 European Women's Team Badminton Championships knockout stage =

This article lists the full results for knockout stage of 2020 European Women's Team Badminton Championships. All times are Central European Time (UTC+01:00).

== Quarterfinals ==
=== Denmark vs. Turkey ===
Denmark
3
Arena Stade Couvert, Court 3
14 February 2020 10:00

Turkey
0

			1	2	3
1	(Denmark) (Turkey)	Mia Blichfeldt; Neslihan Yiğit	20; 22	23; 21	21; 12
2	(Denmark) (Turkey)	Julie Dawall Jakobsen; Aliye Demirbağ	21; 18	21; 17
3	(Denmark) (Turkey)	Line Christophersen; Özge Bayrak	21; 18	21; 15
4	(Denmark) (Turkey)	Alexandra Bøje / Mette Poulsen; Bengisu Erçetin / Nazlıcan İnci				not played
5	(Denmark) (Turkey)	Maiken Fruergaard / Amalie Magelund; Özge Bayrak / Neslihan Yiğit				not played

=== France vs. Sweden ===
France
3
Arena Stade Couvert, Court 1
14 February 2020 10:00

Sweden
1

			1	2	3
1	(France) (Sweden)	Qi Xuefei; Ashwathi Pillai	21; 15	21; 16
2	(France) (Sweden)	Marie Batomene; Rebecca Kuhl	21; 18	21; 14
3	(France) (Sweden)	Yaëlle Hoyaux; Edith Urell	14; 21	13; 21
4	(France) (Sweden)	Delphine Delrue / Anne Tran; Emma Karlsson / Johanna Magnusson	21; 15	21; 17
5	(France) (Sweden)	Vimala Hériau / Margot Lambert; Clara Nistad / Edith Urell				not played

=== Hungary vs. Germany ===
Hungary
0
Arena Stade Couvert, Court 4
14 February 2020 10:00

Germany
3

			1	2	3
1	(Hungary) (Germany)	Laura Sárosi; Yvonne Li	7; 21	12; 21
2	(Hungary) (Germany)	Agnes Korosi; Fabienne Deprez	21; 14	16; 21	10; 21
3	(Hungary) (Germany)	Vivien Sandorhazi; Miranda Wilson	21; 16	18; 21	16; 21
4	(Hungary) (Germany)	Daniella Gonda / Agnes Korosi; Linda Efler / Isabel Herttrich				not played
5	(Hungary) (Germany)	Reka Madarasz / Vivien Sandorhazi; Lara Käpplein / Kilasu Ostermeyer				not played

=== Scotland vs. Russia ===
Scotland
3
Arena Stade Couvert, Court 2
14 February 2020 10:00

Russia
0

			1	2	3
1	(Scotland) (Russia)	Kirsty Gilmour; Evgeniya Kosetskaya	21; 11	17; 21	21; 18
2	(Scotland) (Russia)	Rachel Sugden; Natalia Perminova	21; 18	21; 13
3	(Scotland) (Russia)	Julie MacPherson; Mariia Golubeva	17; 21	21; 10	21; 13
4	(Scotland) (Russia)	Eleanor O'Donnell / Ciara Torrance; Ekaterina Bolotova / Alina Davletova				not played
5	(Scotland) (Russia)	Kirsty Gilmour / Julie MacPherson; Anastasiia Akchurina / Nina Vislova				not played

== Semifinals ==
=== Denmark vs. France ===
Denmark
3
Arena Stade Couvert, Court 1
15 February 2020 10:00

France
1

			1	2	3
1	(Denmark) (France)	Julie Dawall Jakobsen; Qi Xuefei	21; 12	16; 21	8; 21
2	(Denmark) (France)	Alexandra Bøje / Mette Poulsen; Delphine Delrue / Anne Tran	21; 17	22; 20
3	(Denmark) (France)	Line Christophersen; Marie Batomene	21; 15	15; 21	21; 14
4	(Denmark) (France)	Maiken Fruergaard / Amalie Magelund; Vimala Hériau / Margot Lambert	21; 14	21; 11
5	(Denmark) (France)	Freja Ravn; Yaëlle Hoyaux				not played

=== Germany vs. Scotland ===
Germany
3
Arena Stade Couvert, Court 2
15 February 2020 10:00

Scotland
1

			1	2	3
1	(Germany) (Scotland)	Yvonne Li; Kirsty Gilmour	21; 19	19; 21	15; 21
2	(Germany) (Scotland)	Fabienne Deprez; Rachel Sugden	21; 13	21; 8
3	(Germany) (Scotland)	Ann-Kathrin Spöri; Julie MacPherson	19; 21	21; 17	21; 9
4	(Germany) (Scotland)	Linda Efler / Isabel Herttrich; Eleanor O'Donnell / Ciara Torrance	21; 19	21; 14
5	(Germany) (Scotland)	Lara Käpplein / Kilasu Ostermeyer; Kirsty Gilmour / Julie MacPherson				not played

== Final ==
=== Denmark vs. Germany ===
Denmark
3
Arena Stade Couvert, Court 1
16 February 2020 10:00

Germany
1

			1	2	3
1	(Denmark) (Germany)	Julie Dawall Jakobsen; Yvonne Li	21; 19	22; 24	16; 21
2	(Denmark) (Germany)	Alexandra Bøje / Mette Poulsen; Linda Efler / Isabel Herttrich	22; 24	21; 16	21; 19
3	(Denmark) (Germany)	Line Christophersen; Fabienne Deprez	21; 14	21; 11
4	(Denmark) (Germany)	Maiken Fruergaard / Amalie Magelund; Stine Küspert / Kilasu Ostermeyer	19; 21	21; 17	21; 12
5	(Denmark) (Germany)	Freja Ravn; Ann-Kathrin Spöri				not played
