= 2018 European Junior Badminton Championships – Girls' doubles =

2018 European Junior Badminton Championships – Girls' Doubles
Tournament details
- Dates: 11 – 16 September 2018
- Edition: 26
- Venue: Kalev Sports Hall
- Location: Tallinn, Estonia

The Girls' Doubles tournament of the 2018 European Junior Badminton Championships was held from 11-16 September. Swedish Doubles Emma Karlsson and Johanna Magnusson clinched this title in the last edition. Danish Amalie Magelund / Freja Ravn leads the seedings this year.

== Seeded ==
1. (Denmark) Amalie Magelund / Freja Ravn (finals)
2. (Turkey) Bengisu Ercetin / Nazlican Inci (champions)
3. (Bulgaria) Maria Delcheva / (Slovenia) Petra Polanc (third round)
4. (Romania) Ioana Grecea / Maria Alexandra Dutu (third round)
5. (Hungary) Vivien Sandorhazi / (Czech Republic) Tereza Svabikova (first round)
6. (Ukraine) Anastasiya Prozorova / Valeriya Rudakova (semi-finals)
7. (Netherlands) Milou Lugters / Alyssa Tirtosentono (first round)
8. (Spain) Elena Andreu / Ana Carbon (quarter-finals)

== Draw ==
=== Finals ===
Quarterfinals
1	(Denmark) Amalie Magelund (Denmark) Freja Ravn	21	21
(Poland) Laura Bujak (Poland) Anna Duda	2	4
(Turkey) Ece Sare Basakin (Turkey) Zehra Erdem	21	10	21
8	(Spain) Elena Andreu (Spain) Ana Carbon	11	21	14
6	(Ukraine) Anastasiya Prozorova (Ukraine) Valeriya Rudakova	21	21
(Sweden) Ashwathi Pillai (Sweden) Tilda Sjoo	12	18
(Denmark) Christine Busch (Denmark) Amalie Schulz	21	18	8
2	(Turkey) Bengisu Ercetin (Turkey) Nazlican Inci	15	21	21

Semifinals
1	(Denmark) Amalie Magelund (Denmark) Freja Ravn	19	21	21
(Turkey) Ece Sare Basakin (Turkey) Zehra Erdem	21	10	14
6	(Ukraine) Anastasiya Prozorova (Ukraine) Valeriya Rudakova	18	21	9
2	(Turkey) Bengisu Ercetin (Turkey) Nazlican Inci	21	16	21

Final
1	(Denmark) Amalie Magelund (Denmark) Freja Ravn	21	17	17
2	(Turkey) Bengisu Ercetin (Turkey) Nazlican Inci	14	21	21

=== Top half ===
==== Section 1 ====
First round
1	(Denmark) A Magelund (Denmark) F Ravn
BYE
(Russia) V Kozyreva (Russia) M Sukhova	21	21
(Romania) L Lungu (Romania) L Milu	13	12
(Estonia) C Kruus (Estonia) R Uprus	8	9
(France) A Desmons (France) J Moinard	21	21
(Belgium) K Boonen (Belgium) C Lassaux	14	17
(Ukraine) V Masaylo (Ukraine) D Poida	21	21

Second round
1	(Denmark) A Magelund (Denmark) F Ravn	21	21
(Russia) V Kozyreva (Russia) M Sukhova	10	13
(France) A Desmons (France) J Moinard	21	21
(Ukraine) V Masaylo (Ukraine) D Poida	12	14

Third round
1	(Denmark) A Magelund (Denmark) F Ravn	21	21
(France) A Desmons (France) J Moinard	8	11

==== Section 2 ====
First round
5	(Hungary) V Sandorhazi (Czech Republic) T Svabikova	17	19
(Poland) L Bujak (Poland) A Duda	21	21
(England) S Kelly (England) H Warner	21	21
(Italy) J Mair (Italy) L Sagmeister	19	17
(Czech Republic) L Krpatova (Czech Republic) K Zuzakova	21	17	21
(Cyprus) I Pissi (Cyprus) A Zintsidou	18	21	11
(Latvia) A Azarova (Latvia) D Stognija	6	12
(Germany) M Kuse (Germany) L Michalski	21	21

Second round
(Poland) L Bujak (Poland) A Duda	21	21
(England) S Kelly (England) H Warner	18	18
(Czech Republic) L Krpatova (Czech Republic) K Zuzakova	18	21	21
(Germany) M Kuse (Germany) L Michalski	21	11	16

Third round
(Poland) L Bujak (Poland) A Duda	21	21
(Czech Republic) L Krpatova (Czech Republic) K Zuzakova	13	16

==== Section 3 ====
First round
3	(Bulgaria) M Delcheva (Slovenia) P Polanc
BYE
(Switzerland) I Dickhaeuser (Switzerland) M Schnider	21	21
(Republic of Ireland) O Flynn (Republic of Ireland) A Troy	13	18
(Cyprus) E Kattirtzi (Bulgaria) G Pavlova	7	9
(Turkey) E S Basakin (Turkey) Z Erdem	21	21
(Portugal) M Afonso (Portugal) I Pardilho	21	11	19
(Moldova) A Cernetchi (Moldova) E-A Diordiev	19	21	21

Second round
3	(Bulgaria) M Delcheva (Slovenia) P Polanc	21	21
(Switzerland) I Dickhaeuser (Switzerland) M Schnider	12	16
(Turkey) E S Basakin (Turkey) Z Erdem	21	21
(Moldova) A Cernetchi (Moldova) E-A Diordiev	12	11

Third round
3	(Bulgaria) M Delcheva (Slovenia) P Polanc	21	15	16
(Turkey) E S Basakin (Turkey) Z Erdem	17	21	21

==== Section 4 ====
First round
8	(Spain) E Andreu (Spain) A Carbon	15	21	21
(Greece) T Lambrianidou (Greece) G Sotiriou	21	17	17
(Israel) Y Pugach (Israel) S Rotshtein	15	12
(Hungary) F D Kiss (Hungary) K Szotak	21	21
(Norway) M Christensen (Norway) E Waland	21	21
(Israel) H Neiman (Slovakia) L Vojtekova	19	13
(Finland) M Krzywacki (Finland) I Suutarinen	21	19	19
(Scotland) L Middleton (Scotland) S Sidebottom	13	21	21

Second round
8	(Spain) E Andreu (Spain) A Carbon	20	21	21
(Hungary) F D Kiss (Hungary) K Szotak	22	12	19
(Norway) M Christensen (Norway) E Waland	16	11
(Scotland) L Middleton (Scotland) S Sidebottom	21	21

Third round
8	(Spain) E Andreu (Spain) A Carbon	21	21
(Scotland) L Middleton (Scotland) S Sidebottom	14	17

=== Bottom half ===
==== Section 5 ====
First round
(Slovakia) A Remenova (Slovakia) M Tarcalova	23	18	21
(Austria) S Au Yeong (Austria) S Herbst	21	21	23
(Portugal) A Fernandes (Portugal) C Lourenco	11	14
(England) M Chapman (England) F Redfearn	21	21
(Wales) L Hart (Wales) A Whiteman	8	14
(Finland) J Monnberg (Finland) J Salonen	21	21
(Belarus) H Bandarenka (Belarus) U Zakharava	12	18
6	(Ukraine) A Prozorova (Ukraine) V Rudakova	21	21

Second round
(Austria) S Au Yeong (Austria) S Herbst	20	17
(England) M Chapman (England) F Redfearn	22	21
(Finland) J Monnberg (Finland) J Salonen	16	15
6	(Ukraine) A Prozorova (Ukraine) V Rudakova	21	21

Third round
(England) M Chapman (England) F Redfearn	14	13
6	(Ukraine) A Prozorova (Ukraine) V Rudakova	21	21

==== Section 6 ====
First round
(Scotland) R Andrew (Scotland) R Sugden	15	21	15
(Sweden) A Pillai (Sweden) T Sjoo	21	15	21
(Germany) E Moszczynski (Germany) Jule Petrikowski	21	21
(Slovenia) N Brajkovic (Slovenia) M Vracar	7	10
(Lithuania) G Mockute (Lithuania) V Movsovic	17	14
(Republic of Ireland) Ra Woods (Republic of Ireland) Re Woods	21	21
BYE
4	(Romania) M A Dutu (Romania) I Grecea

Second round
(Sweden) A Pillai (Sweden) T Sjoo	21	21
(Germany) E Moszczynski (Germany) Jule Petrikowski	18	16
(Republic of Ireland) Ra Woods (Republic of Ireland) Re Woods	13	27	18
4	(Romania) M A Dutu (Romania) I Grecea	21	25	21

Third round
(Sweden) A Pillai (Sweden) T Sjoo	21	21
4	(Romania) M A Dutu (Romania) I Grecea	12	13

==== Section 7 ====
First round
(Norway) S Macsali (Norway) E P Norberg	10	14
(France) L Huet (France) M Le Turdu	21	21
(Iceland) T Eylands (Iceland) U H Orvar	6	8
(Denmark) C Busch (Denmark) A Schulz	21	21
(Poland) M Kulska (Poland) Z Parysz	19	21	21
(Italy) M Corsini (Italy) C Passeri	21	15	14
(Russia) A Kurdyukova (Russia) A Shapovalova	21	20	21
7	(Netherlands) M Lugters (Netherlands) A Tirtosentono	13	22	16

Second round
(France) L Huet (France) M Le Turdu	12	21	13
(Denmark) C Busch (Denmark) A Schulz	21	16	21
(Poland) M Kulska (Poland) Z Parysz	11	9
(Russia) A Kurdyukova (Russia) A Shapovalova	21	21

Third round
(Denmark) C Busch (Denmark) A Schulz	21	21
(Russia) A Kurdyukova (Russia) A Shapovalova	18	21

==== Section 8 ====
First round
(Switzerland) J Franconville (Switzerland) D Pelupessy	14	16
(Spain) N Diaz (Spain) C Leal	21	21
(Moldova) V Ginga (Bulgaria) H Popovska	21	23
(Latvia) U Berga (Latvia) L Lencevica	15	21
(Estonia) K Kapanen (Estonia) V Korobova	18	21	21
(Croatia) I Misir (Croatia) I Sadaic	21	15	19
BYE
2	(Turkey) B Ercetin (Turkey) N Inci

Second round
(Spain) N Diaz (Spain) C Leal	16	19
(Moldova) V Ginga (Bulgaria) H Popovska	21	21
(Estonia) K Kapanen (Estonia) V Korobova	7	9
2	(Turkey) B Ercetin (Turkey) N Inci	21	21

Third round
(Moldova) V Ginga (Bulgaria) H Popovska	16	14
2	(Turkey) B Ercetin (Turkey) N Inci	21	21
