= Moldovan National Badminton Championships =

The Moldovan National Badminton Championships is a tournament organized to crown the best badminton players in Moldova. They are held since 1995.

== Past winners ==
Year	Men's singles	Women's singles	Men's doubles	Women's doubles	Mixed doubles
1995	Vitalii Sekerinau	Olga Koseli	Maxim Karpenko; Vladimir Cekoi	Marina Buruian; Tatiana Gazia	Maxim Karpenko; Marina Buruian
1996	Maxim Karpenko	Marina Buruian	Maxim Karpenko; Vitalii Sekerianu	Marina Buruian; Tatiana Gazia	Pavel Scicico; Tatiana Gazia
1997	Maxim Karpenko	Marina Buruian	Maxim Karpenko; Vitalii Sekerianu	Marina Buruian; Tatiana Gazia	Maxim Karpenko; Marina Buruian
1998	Maxim Karpenko	Marina Buruian	Maxim Karpenko; Egor Ursatii	Marina Buruian; Nadia Litvinenko	Maxim Karpanenko; Marina Buruian
1999	Egor Ursatii	Nadejda Litvinenko	Artur Troshin; Egor Ursatii	Marina Buruian; Nadia Litvinenko	Maxim Karpanenko; Marina Buruian
2000	Egor Ursatii	Nadejda Litvinenko	Artur Troshin; Egor Ursatii	Marina Buruian; Nadia Litvinenko	Maxim Karpanenko; Marina Buruian
2001	Maxim Karpenko	Olga Kuzmenko	Maxim Karpenko; Vladimir Cekoi	Nadia Litvinenko; Olga Cosel	Maxim Karpanenko; Nadia Litvinenko
2002	Maxim Karpenko	Olga Kuzmenko	Maxim Karpenko; Egor Ursatii	Nadia Litvinenko; Olga Kuzmenko	Maxim Karpenko; Nadia Litvinenko
2003	Maxim Karpenko	Olga Kuzmenko	Maxim Karpenko; Egor Ursatii	Nadia Litvinenko; Olga Kuzmenko	Maxim Karpenko; Nadia Litvinenko
2004	Maxim Karpenko	Olga Kuzmenko	Maxim Karpenko; Vladimir Cekoi	Olga Kuzmenko; Ekaterina Andronic	Maxim Karpenko; Nadia Litvinenko
2005	Maxim Karpenko	Olga Kuzmenko	Maxim Karpenko; Egor Ursatii	Nadia Litvinenko; Olga Kuzmenko	Maxim Karpenko; Nadia Litvinenko
2006	Egor Ursatii	Olga Kuzmenko	Maxim Karpenko; Egor Ursatii	Nadia Litvinenko; Olga Kuzmenko	Maxim Karpenko; Nadia Litvinenko
2007	Egor Ursatii	Olga Kuzmenko	Alexander Morari; Egor Ursatii	Natalia Koseli; Nadia Litvinenko	Egor Ursatii; Olga Kuzmenko
2008	Egor Ursatii	Olga Kuzmenko	Alexander Morari; Egor Ursatii	Nadia Litvinenko; Olga Kuzmenko	Maxim Karpenko; Nadia Litvinenko
2009	Maxim Karpenko	Olga Kuzmenko	Maxim Karpenko; Egor Ursatii	Nadia Litvinenko; Olga Kuzmenko	Maxim Karpenko; Anna Ali
2010	Maxim Karpenko	Olga Kuzmenko	Maxim Karpenko; Alexander Morari	Olga Kuzmenko; Ekaterina Andronic	Maxim Karpenko; Anna Ali
2011	Alexander Nagornov	Olga Kuzmenko	Maxim Karpenko; Alexander Morari	Olga Kuzmenko; Ekaterina Andronic	Alexander Nagornov; Oxana Cernega
2012	Alexander Morari	Vlada Ginga	Maxim Karpenko; Alexander Morari	Anna Cernetchi; Vlada Ginga	Alexandr Apostoluc; Olga Kuzmenko
2013	Maxim Karpenko	Vlada Ginga	Maxim Karpenko; Alexander Morari	Anna Cernetchi; Vlada Ginga	Maxim Karpenko; Daria Manughevici
2014	Maxim Karpenko	Vlada Ginga	Maxim Karpenko; Alexander Morari	Anna Cernetchi; Vlada Ginga	Maxim Karpenko; Alena Apostoluc
2015	Maxim Karpenko	Vlada Ginga	Maxim Karpenko; Alexander Morari	Vlada Ginga; Anna Cernetskii	Alexander Morari; Vlada Ginga
2016	Alexander Ursatii	Paola Ginga	Vladimir Leadavschi; Vitalie Izbaș	Dariana Kuneva; Ksenia Gutu	Alexander Morari; Vlada Ginga
2017	Maxim Karpenko	Vlada Ginga	Maxim Karpenko; Oleg Suliga	Olga Krasnii; Victoria Dulap	Igor Uscov; Olga Krasnii
2018	Alexander Morari	Vlada Ginga	Maxim Karpenko; Alexander Morari	Vlada Ginga; Paola Ginga	Alexander Morari; Vlada Ginga
2019	Maxim Karpenko	Vlada Ginga	Maxim Karpenko; Alexander Morari	Vlada Ginga; Paola Ginga	Alexander Morari; Vlada Ginga
2020	No competition				
2021	Alexander Morari	Vlada Ginga	Oleg Sulga; Alexander Morari	Vlada Ginga; Paola Ginga	Alexander Morari; Vlada Ginga
2022	Maxim Karpenko	Vlada Ginga	Peter Kunev; Alexander Ursatii	Vlada Ginga; Paola Ginga	Alexander Morari; Vlada Ginga
2023	Nicolae Enachi	Dominica Bragnebun	Vladimir Leadavschi; Vitalie Izbash	Dominica Bragnebun; Paola Ginga	Nicolae Enachi; Paola Ginga
2024	Vladimir Leadavschi	Vlada Ginga	Vladimir Leadavschi; Vitalie Izbash	Vlada Ginga; Paola Ginga	Nicolae Enachi; Paola Ginga
