= 2018 BWF World Junior Championships – Girls' singles =

2018 BWF World Junior Championships Girls' Singles
Tournament details
- Dates: 12 – 18 November 2018
- Edition: 20th
- Level: International
- Venue: Markham Pan Am Centre
- Location: Markham, Canada

The girls' singles of the tournament 2018 BWF World Junior Championships was held on 12–18 November. The defending champions of the last edition is Gregoria Mariska Tunjung from Indonesia.

== Seeds ==
1. (China) Wang Zhiyi (semifinals)
2. (Thailand) Phittayaporn Chaiwan (fourth round)
3. (Malaysia) Goh Jin Wei (champion)
4. (China) Wei Yaxin (semifinals)
5. (China) Zhou Meng (quarterfinals)
6. (Japan) Hirari Mizui (fourth round)
7. (Hungary) Vivien Sandorhazi (third round)
8. (India) Purva Barve (third round)

9. (Thailand) Chasinee Korepap (third round)
10. (Singapore) Jaslyn Hooi Yue Yann (third round)
11. (Hungary) Reka Madarasz (second round)
12. (Thailand) Benyapa Aimsaard (second round)
13. (Denmark) Line Christophersen (final)
14. (Czech Republic) Tereza Švábíková (third round)
15. (Brazil) Jaqueline Lima (third round)
16. (France) Léonice Huet (second round)

Click on the seed number of a player to go to their draw section.

== Draw ==
=== Finals ===
Quarterfinals
1 | (China) Wang Zhiyi | 21 | 21
5 | (China) Zhou Meng | 18 | 10
3 | (Malaysia) Goh Jin Wei | 21 | 21
(South Korea) Lee So-yul | 11 | 5
(South Korea) Park Ga-eun | 23 | 15 | 18
4 | (China) Wei Yaxin | 21 | 21 | 21
(Malaysia) Eoon Qi Xuan | 21 | 21
13 | (Denmark) Line Christophersen | 23 | 23

Semifinals
1 | (China) Wang Zhiyi | 9 | 13
3 | (Malaysia) Goh Jin Wei | 21 | 21
4 | (China) Wei Yaxin | 18 | 21
13 | (Denmark) Line Christophersen | 21 | 23

Finals
3 | (Malaysia) Goh Jin Wei | 21 | 21
13 | (Denmark) Line Christophersen | 13 | 11

=== Top half ===
==== Section 1 ====
First round
(India) M Bansod | 20 | 24
(Hong Kong) S S Mehta | 22 | 26
(Canada) K Ho-shue | 21 | 21
(Sri Lanka) D Dias | 16 | 16
(Ukraine) V Rudakova | 19 | 14
(Scotland) L Middleton | 21 | 21
(Chinese Taipei) Tung C-t | 13 | 21 | 8
(Indonesia) S Widjaja | 21 | 15 | 21
(Japan) R Gunji | 21 | 21
(Ukraine) V Masaylo | 8 | 6

Second round
1 | (China) Wang ZY | 21 | 21
(Peru) F Saponara | 9 | 14
(Hong Kong) S S Mehta | 16 | 21 | 8
(Canada) K Ho-shue | 21 | 15 | 21
9 | (Thailand) C Korepap | 21 | 21
(Scotland) L Middleton | 7 | 9
(Indonesia) S Widjaja | 21 | 15 | 12
(Japan) R Gunji | 16 | 21 | 21

Third round
1 | (China) Wang ZY | 21 | 21
(Canada) K Ho-shue | 13 | 18
9 | (Thailand) C Korepap | 20 | 17
(Japan) R Gunji | 22 | 21

Fourth round
1 | (China) Wang ZY | 21 | 21
(Japan) R Gunji | 19 | 14

==== Section 2 ====
First round
(Indonesia) O M Kambey | 21 | 21
(Singapore) J R Sito | 8 | 13
(Austria) R Winkler | 21 | 21
(Macau) Cheong I T | 9 | 4
(Faroe Islands) S Thomsen | 5 | 4
(United States) S Pandey | 21 | 21
(Spain) A Carbon | 13 | 5
(Indonesia) Y E Setiawan | 21 | 21
(Guyana) P Ramdhani | 13 | 14
(Mexico) F Rio | 21 | 21
(Netherlands) M Versteeg | 12 | 17
(Denmark) A Schulz | 21 | 21

Second round
5 | (China) Zhou M | 21 | 18 | 21
(Indonesia) O M Kambey | 8 | 21 | 10
(Austria) R Winkler | 16 | 11
(United States) S Pandey | 21 | 21
11 | (Hungary) R Madarász | 11 | 10
(Indonesia) Y E Setiawan | 21 | 21
(Mexico) F Rio | 11 | 16
(Denmark) A Schulz | 21 | 21

Third round
5 | (China) Zhou M | 21 | 21
(United States) S Pandey | 7 | 15
(Indonesia) Y E Setiawan | 21 | 21
(Denmark) A Schulz | 13 | 11

Fourth round
5 | (China) Zhou M | 21 | 21
(Indonesia) Y E Setiawan | 10 | 18

==== Section 3 ====
First round
(Faroe Islands) L M Joensen | 13 | 13
(Australia) Z Fung | 21 | 21
(Slovakia) A Remenova | 21 | 21
(Poland) J Plawecka | 14 | 16
(South Africa) C Yiatses | 17 | 21 | 22
(Kenya) K Ghia | 21 | 10 | 20
(Mexico) J J Bautista | 21 | 21
(Uganda) T Naluwooza | 9 | 16
(Canada) W Zhang | 21 | 21
(Spain) E Andreu | 18 | 15

Second round
3 | (Malaysia) Goh J W | 21 | 21
(Brazil) S Lima | 8 | 6
(Australia) Z Fung | 21 | 21
(Slovakia) A Remenova | 12 | 17
15 | (Brazil) J Lima | 21 | 21
(South Africa) C Yiatses | 9 | 4
(Mexico) J J Bautista | 5 | 15
(Canada) W Zhang | 21 | 21

Third round
3 | (Malaysia) Goh J W | 21 | 21
(Australia) Z Fung | 5 | 6
15 | (Brazil) J Lima | 7 | 20
(Canada) W Zhang | 21 | 22

Fourth round
3 | (Malaysia) Goh J W | 21 | 21
(Canada) W Zhang | 11 | 10

==== Section 4 ====
First round
(New Zealand) R Apalisok | 8 | 13
(France) M Le Turdu | 21 | 21
(Germany) A-K Spöri | 21 | 21
(Norway) S Macsali | 10 | 13
(United States) E Shi | 19 | 17
(Denmark) S Grundtvig | 21 | 21
(Mongolia) M Lkhagvasuren | 2 | 12
(New Zealand) E Smith | 21 | 21
(South Korea) Lee S-y | 21 | 21
(Sweden) M Norman | 10 | 8
(Sri Lanka) H N Ambalangodage | 18 | 21 | 21
(England) A Harris | 21 | 19 | 10

Second round
6 | (Japan) H Mizui | 21 | 21
(France) M Le Turdu | 10 | 13
(Germany) A-K Spöri | 20 | 12
(Denmark) S Grundtvig | 22 | 21
14 | (Czech Republic) T Švábíková | 21 | 21
(New Zealand) E Smith | 14 | 13
(South Korea) Lee S-y | 21 | 21
(Sri Lanka) H N Ambalangodage | 8 | 11

Third round
6 | (Japan) H Mizui | 21 | 21
(Denmark) S Grundtvig | 9 | 12
14 | (Czech Republic) T Švábíková | 10 | 21 | 14
(South Korea) Lee S-y | 21 | 19 | 21

Fourth round
6 | (Japan) H Mizui | 18 | 18
(South Korea) Lee S-y | 21 | 21

=== Bottom half ===
==== Section 5 ====
First round
(Sweden) E Urell | 21 | 21
(Ukraine) A Prozorova | 15 | 9
(Czech Republic) T S van Coppenolle | 15 | 11
(South Korea) Chung D-j | 21 | 21
(Germany) T P Nguyen | 21 | 21
(Faroe Islands) A K M Pedersen | 10 | 8
(South Korea) Park G-e | 21 | 19 | 21
(Japan) N Someya | 16 | 21 | 17
(Peru) I Mendoza | 13 | 21 | 23
(Singapore) M Lee | 21 | 17 | 21
(Poland) J Podedworny | 21 | 21
(South Africa) M de Beer | 13 | 17

Second round
(Sweden) E Urell | 12 | 7
(South Korea) Chung D-j | 21 | 21
(Germany) T P Nguyen | 12 | 18
10 | (Singapore) J Hooi | 21 | 21
(South Korea) Park G-e | 21 | 21
(Peru) I Mendoza | 5 | 11
(Poland) J Podedworny | 10 | 7
7 | (Hungary) V Sandorhazi | 21 | 21

Third round
(South Korea) Chung D-j | 21 | 21
10 | (Singapore) J Hooi | 16 | 19
(South Korea) Park G-e | 21 | 21
7 | (Hungary) V Sandorhazi | 15 | 15

Fourth round
(South Korea) Chung D-j | 13 | 21 | 15
(South Korea) Park G-e | 21 | 19 | 21

==== Section 6 ====
First round
(Chinese Taipei) Hung E-t | 21 | 21
(United States) K Ngo | 17 | 13
(Germany) J Petrikowski | 21 | 17 | 21
(Norway) E Waland | 17 | 21 | 17
(Kenya) S Patel | 4 | 6
(Hong Kong) Leung Y Y | 21 | 21
(Macau) Chio W U | 17 | 18
(Sri Lanka) J Amanda | 21 | 21
(Chinese Taipei) Lin S-y | 21 | 21
(Switzerland) M Schnider | 17 | 9
(Macau) Wong C W | 13 | 6
(Netherlands) M Linders | 21 | 21

Second round
(Chinese Taipei) Hung E-t | 21 | 21
(Germany) J Petrikowski | 10 | 12
(Hong Kong) Leung Y Y | 15 | 21 | 21
12 | (Thailand) B Aimsaard | 21 | 16 | 17
(Sri Lanka) J Amanda | 23 | 6 | 7
(Chinese Taipei) Lin S-y | 21 | 21 | 21
(Netherlands) M Linders | 5 | 7
4 | (China) Wei YX | 21 | 21

Third round
(Chinese Taipei) Hung E-t | 21 | 19 | 12
(Hong Kong) Leung Y Y | 14 | 21 | 21
(Chinese Taipei) Lin S-y | 15 | 16
4 | (China) Wei YX | 21 | 21

Fourth round
(Hong Kong) Leung Y Y | 14 | 11
4 | (China) Wei YX | 21 | 21

==== Section 7 ====
First round
(South Korea) Kim G-l | 7 | 17
(Indonesia) P K Wardani | 21 | 21
(Australia) K Ea | 20 | 15
(Spain) N Díaz | 22 | 21
(Australia) A Yu | 5 | 11
(Canada) T Ng | 21 | 21
(Slovakia) M Tarcalova | 10 | 15
(Brazil) J Vieira | 21 | 21
(Scotland) R Sugden | 10 | 10
(Malaysia) Eoon Q X | 21 | 21
(Thailand) P Choeikeewong | 21 | 21
(Norway) M Christensen | 5 | 6

Second round
(Indonesia) P K Wardani | 21 | 21
(Spain) N Díaz | 9 | 10
(Canada) T Ng | 21 | 21
16 | (France) L Huet | 11 | 11
(Brazil) J Vieira | 16 | 11
(Malaysia) Eoon Q X | 21 | 21
(Thailand) P Choeikeewong | 17 | 14
8 | (India) P Barve | 21 | 21

Third round
(Indonesia) P K Wardani | 21 | 21
(Canada) T Ng | 16 | 14
(Malaysia) Eoon Q X | 21 | 21
8 | (India) P Barve | 15 | 10

Fourth round
(Indonesia) P K Wardani | 19 | 10
(Malaysia) Eoon Q X | 21 | 21

==== Section 8 ====
First round
(Sweden) A Pillai | 21 | 13 | 21
(England) F Redfearn | 18 | 21 | 14
(Uganda) F M Rafi | 8 | 11
(Czech Republic) K Zuzakova | 21 | 21
(Peru) Cao Y Y | 8 | 5
(Japan) M Takahashi | 21 | 21
(China) Han QX | 21 | 21
(New Zealand) S Li | 8 | 8
(India) G Gopichand | 21 | 21
(Mexico) A Quinones | 10 | 9

Second round
(Sweden) A Pillai | 22 | 21
(Czech Republic) K Zuzakova | 20 | 14
(Japan) M Takahashi | 21 | 18
13 | (Denmark) L Christophersen | 23 | 21
(China) Han QX | 15 | 21 | 21
(India) G Gopichand | 21 | 11 | 19
(Mongolia) B Batbayar | 1 | 5
2 | (Thailand) P Chaiwan | 21 | 21

Third round
(Sweden) A Pillai | 13 | 21 | 20
13 | (Denmark) L Christophersen | 21 | 19 | 22
(China) Han QX | 22 | 18 | 14
2 | (Thailand) P Chaiwan | 20 | 21 | 21

Fourth round
13 | (Denmark) L Christophersen | 21 | 21
2 | (Thailand) P Chaiwan | 19 | 18
