= WorldBox =

2012 video game

- Developer: Maxim Karpenko
- Designer: Hugo Vaz
- Programmers: Mastef; Maxim Karpenko
- Artists: Hugo Vaz; Alifanov Ilia
- Composers: Milan Milosevic; John Pata
- Engine: Unity
- Platforms: iOS; Android; MacOS; Linux; Windows
- Release: Browser: WW: 24 September 2012; Android: WW: 16 December 2018; iOS: WW: 13 February 2019; Windows/Mac alpha: WW: 10 October 2019
- Genres: Sandbox, god game
- Mode: Single-player

WorldBox is a 2012 sandbox game by Maxim Karpenko. The game allows the use of different elements to create, change, and destroy virtual worlds as well as civilizations using powers given to them. In the game, players can make and destroy while handling the "politics" of the world.

== Gameplay ==
The game's main feature is the ability to create worlds with different creatures and landforms, using godlike tools known as "God powers" provided in the game. These are divided into several groups: World Creation, Civilizations, Creatures, Nature and Disasters, Destruction Powers, and Other Powers. Conversely, the game also allows the destruction of worlds, ranging from explosives to natural disasters, such as earthquakes, volcanoes, and acid rain. Populations can also be reduced with hostile entities, illnesses, etc. Worlds can also, as of version 0.21, go through "ages", which can affect biomes and creatures, both negatively and positively.

Many creatures are able to create civilizations (humans, orcs, elves, dwarves, and humanoid animals). Such civilizations can grow, declare war on each other, make alliances, and suffer rebellions. In the game you can force different kingdoms to rebel, ally, or go to war.

Beginning with version 0.14, players are also able to customise the banners and symbols of kingdoms, along with the ability to control the traits of creatures, adding more content and depth to the gameplay. Beginning with version 0.21, kingdoms can form alliances, and kings and leaders can form clans.

== Development ==
Russian game developer Maxim Karpenko started working on the game back in 2011, and published the first prototype on Flash in the same year. In 2012, he released it on Newgrounds. He continued working on the game for several years, and released it on Android in December 2018, with the IOS version coming in early February 2019. He proceeded to work on the game and released it for Windows in October 2019 and in December 2021 it released on Steam.

== Reception ==
Graham Smith of Rock Paper Shotgun wrote: "I'd probably had my fill of WorldBox after around 4 hours, but it was a happy four hours." Joseph Knoop of PC Gamer wrote: "It's funny how much WorldBox shares with big strategy games, despite not presenting an ultimate goal to the player, and almost always ending with a boredom-killing nuclear bomb. Watching the borders of a kingdom stretch, retract, and suddenly disappear tickles a part of my brain that really likes to be tickled. Considering WorldBox is about to become an Early Access game on Steam, I'm eager to see what other maniacal tools get added to the toybox."
