= Zehra Erdem =

Turkish badminton player (born 2001)

Personal information
- Born: 23 June 2001 (age 25) Erzincan, Turkey

Sport
- Country: Turkey
- Sport: Badminton
- Event: Women's singles & doubles
Medal record
Women's badminton
Representing Turkey
European Team Championships
Bronze medal – third place	2026 Istanbul	Women's team
European Junior Championships
Bronze medal – third place	2018 Tallinn	Girls' doubles

Zehra Erdem (born 23 June 2001) is a Turkish badminton player. She was part of the national U15, U17 and U19 reams before she became a member of the women's national team.

== Sport career ==
Erdem started playing badminton at the age of nine inspired by her friends, who used to go to the nearby sports hall for badminton exercise, and by the flying of the shuttlecock in the air. She is a member of Erzincan İl Özel İdaresi SK in her hometown. In 2013, she was selected to the Turkey national team. She became champion at the European U15 and U17 Championships as the first Turkish player. She was named among the four "Best Youth Badminton Players 2017" by the European Federation. At the 2018 European U19 Championships, she won a bronze medal. She was nominated for the "Youngest Successful Badminton Player of Europe in 2018", and was selected the runners-up. In 2016, she won the gold medal in the girls' doubles event with teammate Bengisu Erçetin at the European U15 Badminton Championships in Kazan, Russia.

At the 2017 European U17 Badminton Championships in Prague, Czech Republic, she received a bronze medal in the girls's singles and the gold medal in the doubles with Bengisu Erçetin. She took a bronze medal in the girls' doubles with Ece Sare Başakın at the 2018 European Junior Badminton Championships in Tallinn, Estonia. In 2019, she took a bronze medal in the mixed doubles with Emre Sönmez, and the gold medal in the women's doubles with İlayda Nur Özelgül at the Hellas International Tournament in Mikra Kalamaria, Greece. The same year at the Turkey Open Tournament in Ankara, she became runner-up in the doubles with İlayda Nur Özelgül. Erdem was part of the national team at the 2020 European Men's and Women's Team Badminton Championships in Liévin, France, that ranked sixth. In 2021 at the Bulgarian International Championship, she and her teammate Emre Sönmez became the runner-up in the mixed doubles event.

She won the champions title with her college team at the 2022 Turkish Inter-University Badminton Super League Championships in Afyonkarahisar, and captured the gold medal in the women's singles event. With this result, the college team qualified to participate at the 2022 European Universities Games in Łódź, Poland. In September she transferred to Fos-sur-Mer club to play in the French Badminton Super League. At the Bonn International Tournament in 2024, she won the doubles with Yasemen Bektaş. In 2025, she won the singles event at the Bulgarian International Championship.

She competed in the women's singles event at the 2026 European Men's and Women's Team Badminton Championships in Istanbul, Turkey. She made three singles matches, winning all. The Turkey women's team lost the semifinals match against Bulgaria, and took a bronze medal.

== Achievements ==
=== European Junior Championships ===
Girls' doubles
Year	Venue	Partner	Opponent	Score	Result
2018	Kalev Sports Hall; Tallinn, Estonia	(Turkey) Ece Sare Başakın	(Denmark) Amalie Magelund (Denmark) Freja Ravn	21–19, 10–21, 14–21	Bronze

=== International Challenge/Series (3 titles, 2 runners-up) ===
Women's singles
Year	Tournament	Opponent	Score	Result
2025	Bulgarian International	(India) Durga Kandrapu	21–19, 21–14	(gold) Winner

Women's doubles
Year	Tournament	Partner	Opponent	Score	Result
2019	Turkey International	(Turkey) İlayda Özelgül	(Turkey) Bengisu Erçetin (Turkey) Nazlıcan İnci	13–21, 15–21	(silver) Runner-up
2019	Hellas International	(Turkey) İlayda Özelgül	(Poland) Wiktoria Adamek (Poland) Wiktoria Dąbczyńska	13–21, 21–12, 23–21	(gold) Winner
2024	Bonn International	(Turkey) Yasemen Bektaş	(Chinese Taipei) Hsieh Yi-en (Chinese Taipei) Ko Ruo-hsuan	21–14, 21–6	(gold) Winner

Mixed doubles
Year	Tournament	Partner	Opponent	Score	Result
2021	Bulgarian International	(Turkey) Emre Sönmez	(Denmark) Kristian Kræmer (Denmark) Amalie Cecilie Kudsk	15–21, 15–21	(silver) Runner-up

BWF International Challenge tournament
BWF International Series tournament
BWF Future Series tournament

=== Junior International (1 title, 7 runner-up) ===
Girls' doubles
Year	Tournament	Partner	Opponent	Score	Result
2016	Turkey Junior International	(Turkey) İlayda Özelgül	(Turkey) Bengisu Erçetin (Turkey) Nazlıcan İnci	10–21, 13–21	(silver) Runner-up
2017	Hellas Junior International	(Turkey) İlayda Özelgül	(Poland) Magdalena Kulska (Poland) Zuzanna Parysz	21–13, 21–19	(gold) Winner
2017	Valamar Junior International	(Turkey) İlayda Özelgül	(Turkey) Bengisu Erçetin (Turkey) Nazlıcan İnci	9–21, 10–21	(silver) Runner-up
2017	Bulgarian Junior International	(Turkey) İlayda Özelgül	(Turkey) Bengisu Erçetin (Turkey) Nazlıcan İnci	9–21, 13–21	(silver) Runner-up
2017	Turkey Junior International	(Turkey) İlayda Özelgül	(Turkey) Bengisu Erçetin (Turkey) Nazlıcan İnci	8–10	(silver) Runner-up
2018	Turkey Junior International	(Turkey) Ece Basakin	(Turkey) Bengisu Erçetin (Turkey) Nazlıcan İnci	16–21, 16–21	(silver) Runner-up
2019	Bulgarian Junior International	(Turkey) Bengisu Erçetin	(India) Aditi Bhatt (India) Tanisha Crasto	15–21, 21–18, 18–21	(silver) Runner-up

Mixed doubles
Year	Tournament	Partner	Opponent	Score	Result
2019	Hellas Junior International	(Turkey) Semih Basakin	(Chinese Taipei) Huang Yu-kai (Chinese Taipei) Wei Wan-yi	11–21, 19–21, 21–23	(silver) Runner-up

BWF Junior International Grand Prix tournament
BWF Junior International Challenge tournament
BWF Junior International Series tournament
BWF Junior Future Series tournament

== Personal life ==
Zehra Erdem was born in Erzincan, eastern Turkey, on 23 June 2001. She studied at the Erzincan Binali Yıldırım University in her hometown.
