= Vlada Ginga =

Moldovan badminton player

Personal information
- Born: 22 April 2001 (age 25) Chișinău, Moldova
- Height: 1.75 m (5 ft 9 in)

Sport
- Country: Moldova
- Sport: Badminton
- Handedness: Right

Women's singles & doubles
- Highest ranking: 198 (WS 14 January 2020); 323 (WD with Hristomira Popovska 28 January 2020); 317 (XD with Alexander Morari 10 May 2018)
- BWF profile

Vlada Ginga (born 22 April 2001) is a Moldovan badminton player. She was part of the first generation of Moldovan badminton player to compete at the World Junior Championships. She won her first junior international title at the 2017 Slovak Junior International in the girls' doubles event partnered with Petra Polanc. She competed at the 2018 Summer Youth Olympics and 2019 European Games.

== Achievements ==
=== BWF International Challenge/Series (1 runner-up) ===
Women's singles
Year	Tournament	Opponent	Score	Result
2019	Kazakhstan International	(Russia) Natalia Perminova	10–21, 8–21	(silver) Runner-up

BWF International Challenge tournament
BWF International Series tournament
BWF Future Series tournament

=== BWF Junior International ===
Girls' doubles
Year	Tournament	Partner	Opponent	Score	Result
2017	Romanian Junior International	(Slovenia) Petra Polanc	(Hungary) Vivien Sándorházi (Czech Republic) Tereza Švábíková	13–21, 11–21	(silver) Runner-up
2017	Ukraine Junior International	(Moldova) Anna Cernetchi	(Bulgaria) Maria Delcheva (Bulgaria) Hristomira Popovska	14–21, 14–21	(silver) Runner-up
2017	Slovak Junior International	(Slovenia) Petra Polanc	(Romania) Maria Dutu (Romania) Ioana Grecea	21–11, 21–18	(gold) Winner
2018	Polish Junior International	(Slovenia) Petra Polanc	(Japan) Miu Nirasawa (Japan) Mashiro Yoshikawa	9–21, 15–21	(silver) Runner-up
2018	Israel Junior International	(Bulgaria) Hristomira Popovska	(Bulgaria) Maria Delcheva (Slovenia) Petra Polanc	19–21, 21–17, 12–21	(silver) Runner-up
2018	Hellas Junior International	(Bulgaria) Hristomira Popovska	(Bulgaria) Maria Delcheva (Slovenia) Petra Polanc	23–21, 23–21	(gold) Winner

BWF Junior International Grand Prix tournament
BWF Junior International Challenge tournament
BWF Junior International Series tournament
BWF Junior Future Series tournament
