= Line Christophersen =

Danish badminton player (born 2000)

Personal information
- Born: Line Drost Christophersen; 14 January 2000 (age 26) Dianalund, Denmark
- Height: 1.76 m (5 ft 9 in)

Sport
- Country: Denmark
- Sport: Badminton
- Handedness: Right

Women's singles
- Highest ranking: 12 (13 October 2026)
- Current ranking: 12 (13 October 2026)
- BWF profile
Medal record
Women's badminton
Representing Denmark
European Championships
Silver medal – second place	2021 Kyiv	Women's singles
European Mixed Team Championships
Gold medal – first place	2021 Vantaa	Mixed team
Gold medal – first place	2023 Aire-sur-la-Lys	Mixed team
Gold medal – first place	2025 Baku	Mixed team
European Women's Team Championships
Gold medal – first place	2020 Liévin	Women's team
Gold medal – first place	2024 Łódź	Women's team
Silver medal – second place	2026 Istanbul	Women's team
World Junior Championships
Silver medal – second place	2018 Markham	Girls' singles
European Junior Championships
Gold medal – first place	2018 Tallinn	Girls' singles
Silver medal – second place	2018 Tallinn	Mixed team
Bronze medal – third place	2017 Mulhouse	Mixed team

Line Drost Christophersen (born 14 January 2000) is a Danish badminton player. She once trained at the Skælskør club, and now belongs to Gentofte. Christophersen won the girls' singles title at the 2018 European Junior Championships, and the silver medal at the World Junior Championships, and then won a silver medal at the 2021 European Championships in the women's singles event. She was part of the team from Denmark that won the 2020 European Women's Team Championships, and at the 2021 and 2023 European Mixed Team Championships.

== Career ==
In 2026, Christophersen reached the quarter-finals in the All England Open.

== Achievements ==
=== European Championships ===
Women's singles
Year	Venue	Opponent	Score	Result
2021	Palace of Sports; Kyiv, Ukraine	(Spain) Carolina Marín	13–21, 18–21	Silver

=== World Junior Championships ===
Girls' singles
Year	Venue	Opponent	Score	Result
2018	Markham Pan Am Centre; Markham, Canada	(Malaysia) Goh Jin Wei	13–21, 11–21	Silver

=== European Junior Championships ===
Girls' singles
Year	Venue	Opponent	Score	Result
2018	Kalev Sports Hall; Tallinn, Estonia	(Denmark) Amalie Schulz	21–12, 21–15	Gold

=== BWF World Tour (1 title, 6 runners-up) ===
The BWF World Tour, which was announced on 19 March 2017 and implemented in 2018, is a series of elite badminton tournaments sanctioned by the Badminton World Federation (BWF). The BWF World Tour is divided into levels of World Tour Finals, Super 1000, Super 750, Super 500, Super 300 (part of the HSBC World Tour), and the BWF Tour Super 100.

Women's singles
Year	Tournament	Level	Opponent	Score	Result
2019	SaarLorLux Open	Super 100	(China) Li Yun	12–21, 13–21	(silver) Runner-up
2021	Orléans Masters	Super 100	(Thailand) Busanan Ongbamrungphan	21–16, 15–21, 19–21	(silver) Runner-up
2021	Spain Masters	Super 300	(Indonesia) Putri Kusuma Wardani	15–21, 10–21	(silver) Runner-up
2023	Guwahati Masters	Super 100	(Thailand) Lalinrat Chaiwan	14–21, 21–17, 16–21	(silver) Runner-up
2025	Macau Open	Super 300	(China) Chen Yufei	17–21, 17–21	(silver) Runner-up
2026	U.S. Open	Super 300	(Bulgaria) Kaloyana Nalbantova	21–16, 16–21, 21–11	(gold) Winner
2026	Canada Open	Super 300	(Japan) Riko Gunji	15–21, 21–15, 6–21	(silver) Runner-up

=== BWF International Challenge/Series (4 titles, 2 runners-up) ===
Women's singles
Year	Tournament	Opponent	Score	Result
2017	Italian International	(Vietnam) Nguyễn Thùy Linh	22–24, 21–16, 21–23	(silver) Runner-up
2019	Dutch International	(Spain) Clara Azurmendi	21–19, 21–14	(gold) Winner
2019	Belgian International	(Turkey) Neslihan Yiğit	23–21, 12–21, 21–11	(gold) Winner
2021	Denmark Masters	(Denmark) Julie Dawall Jakobsen	21–11, 21–17	(gold) Winner
2023	Belgian International	(Turkey) Neslihan Arın	11–21, 21–14, 17–21	(silver) Runner-up
2024	Nantes International	(Denmark) Amalie Schulz	21–17, 21–11	(gold) Winner

BWF International Challenge tournament
BWF International Series tournament
BWF Future Series tournament

=== BWF Junior International (1 title, 1 runner-up) ===
Girls' singles

Year	Tournament	Opponent	Score	Result
2017	Danish Junior Cup	(Denmark) Michelle Skødstrup	16–21, 21–14, 17–21	(silver) Runner-up
2018	Danish Junior Cup	(Denmark) Frederikke Lund	21–11, 21–12	(gold) Winner

BWF Junior International Grand Prix tournament
BWF Junior International Challenge tournament
BWF Junior International Series tournament
BWF Junior Future Series tournament
