= Vivien Sándorházi =

Hungarian badminton player

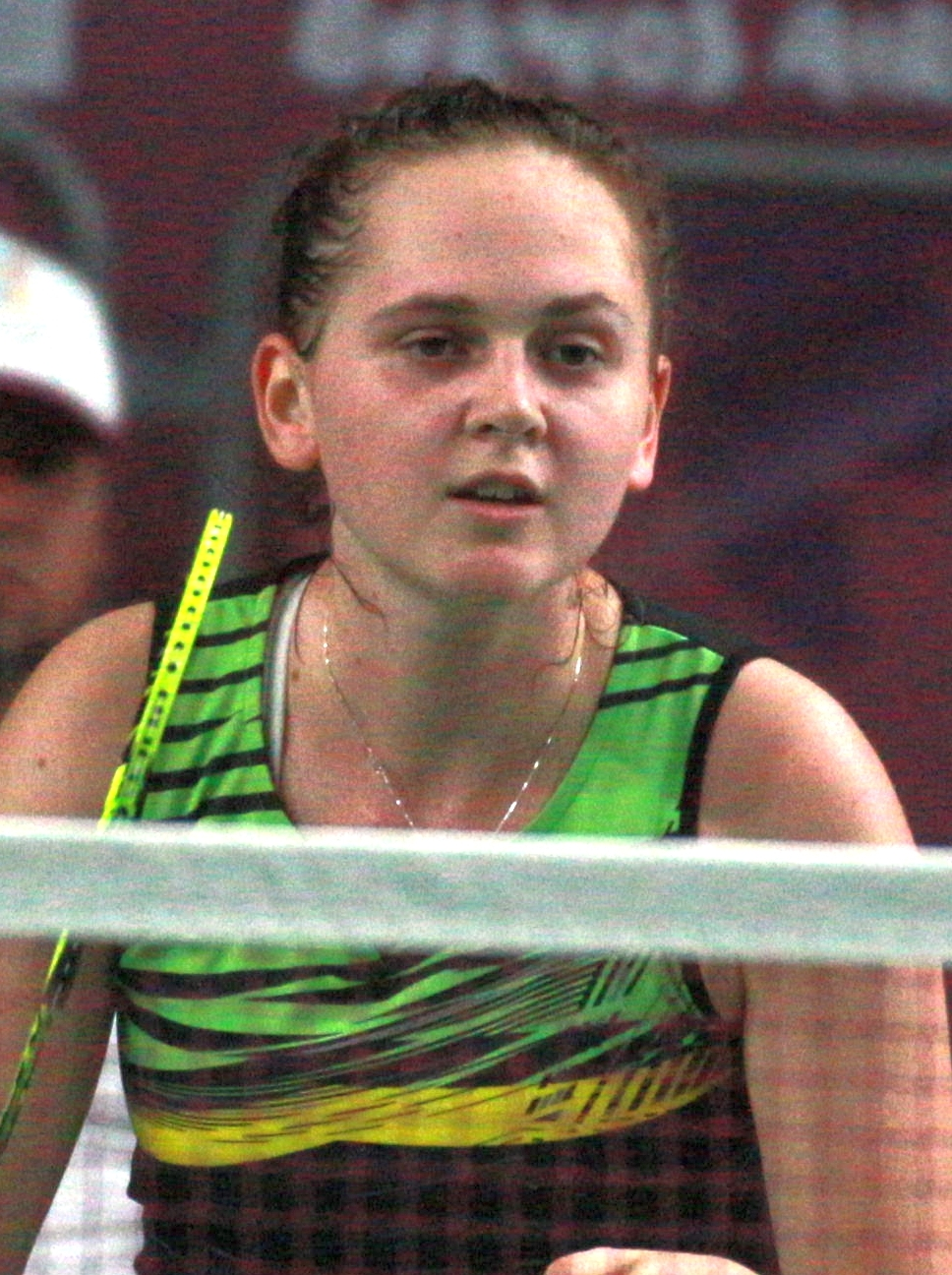
- Sándorházi at the 2018 Summer Youth Olympics

Personal information
- Born: 3 January 2001 (age 25) Budapest, Hungary

Sport
- Country: Hungary
- Sport: Badminton
- Coached by: Ákos Király, Antal Varga

Women's singles
- Highest ranking: 73 (13 October 2026)
- Current ranking: 73 (13 October 2026)
- BWF profile
Medal record
Women's badminton
Representing Hungary
European Championships
Bronze medal – third place	2025 Horsens	Women's singles
European Junior Championships
Bronze medal – third place	2018 Tallinn	Girls' singles

Vivien Sándorházi (born 3 January 2001) is a Hungarian badminton player affiliated with Újpesti Tollaslabda SE who competes in international level events. She was a bronze medalists in the 2025 European Championships. Sándorházi also won a bronze medal at the 2018 European Junior Championships and has represented her country at the 2018 Summer Youth Olympics.

== Achievements ==
=== European Championships ===
Women's singles
Year	Venue	Opponent	Score	Result	Ref.
2025	Forum; Horsens, Denmark	(Scotland) Kirsty Gilmour	11–21, 15–21	Bronze	

=== European Junior Championships ===
Girls' singles
Year	Venue	Opponent	Score	Result
2018	Kalev Sports Hall; Tallinn, Estonia	(Denmark) Amalie Schulz	21–18, 12–21, 19–21	Bronze

=== BWF International Challenge/Series (2 runner-up) ===
Women's singles
Year	Tournament	Opponent	Score	Result
2020	Slovak International	(Chinese Taipei) Lin Jhih-yun	17–21, 6–21	(silver) Runner-up
2021	Hellas International	(England) Abigail Holden	21–18, 15–21, 14–21	(silver) Runner-up

BWF International Challenge tournament
BWF International Series tournament
BWF Future Series tournament

=== BWF Junior International (12 titles, 6 runners-up) ===
Girls' singles
Year	Tournament	Opponent	Score	Result
2016	Slovak Junior International	(Spain) Sara Peñalver Pereira	19–21, 13–21	(silver) Runner-up
2017	Polish Junior International	(Poland) Wiktoria Dąbczyńska	21–16, 21–13	(gold) Winner
2017	Hungarian Junior International	(Hungary) Réka Madarász	12–10, 14–12, 9–11, 11–5	(gold) Winner
2017	Valamar Junior Open	(Bulgaria) Maria Delcheva	21–16, 21–10	(gold) Winner
2017	Belgian Junior International	(India) Vaishnavi Reddy Jakka	19–21, 21–17, 12–21	(silver) Runner-up
2017	Slovenia Junior International	(Hungary) Réka Madarász	21–19, 16–21, 17–21	(silver) Runner-up
2017	Czech Junior International	(Bulgaria) Maria Delcheva	18–21, 19–21	(silver) Runner-up
2018	Polish Junior International	(Japan) Mashiro Yoshikawa	11–21, 19–21	(silver) Runner-up
2018	Hungarian Junior International	(Hungary) Réka Madarász	21–12, 21–19	(gold) Winner
2019	Hungarian Junior International	(Serbia) Marija Sudimac	21–15, 21–13	(gold) Winner
2019	Valamar Junior Open	(Switzerland) Milena Schnider	21–10, 21–19	(gold) Winner
2019	Irish Junior Open	(England) Pamela Reyes	21–13, 21–18	(gold) Winner
2019	Slovenia Junior International	(Serbia) Marija Sudimac	21–10, 21–12	(gold) Winner

Girls' doubles
Year	Tournament	Partner	Opponent	Score	Result
2017	Hungarian Junior International	(Czech Republic) Tereza Švábíková	(Poland) Wiktoria Dąbczyńska (Poland) Aleksandra Goszczyńska	11–9, 11–6, 11–8	(gold) Winner
2017	Romanian Junior International	(Czech Republic) Tereza Švábíková	(Moldova) Vlada Gynga (Slovenia) Petra Polanc	21–13, 21–11	(gold) Winner
2017	Slovenia Junior International	(Czech Republic) Tereza Švábíková	(Romania) Maria Alexandra Dutu (Romania) Ioana Grecea	21–17, 20–22, 21–15	(gold) Winner
2018	Hungarian Junior International	(Hungary) Réka Madarász	(Austria) Serena Au Yeong (Austria) Sabrina Herbst	15–21, 12–21	(silver) Runner-up

Mixed doubles
Year	Tournament	Partner	Opponent	Score	Result
2018	Cyprus Junior International	(Switzerland) Nicolas Müller	(Netherlands) Gijs Duijs (Netherlands) Madouc Linders	21–10, 21–18	(gold) Winner

BWF Junior International Grand Prix tournament
BWF Junior International Challenge tournament
BWF Junior International Series tournament
BWF Junior Future Series tournament
