= Réka Madarász =

Hungarian badminton player

Personal information
- Born: 2 July 2000 (age 26)

Sport
- Country: Hungary
- Sport: Badminton
- Handedness: Right

Women's singles
- Career record: 161 wins, 76 losses
- Highest ranking: 139 (17 March 2020)
- Current ranking: 139 (17 March 2020)
- BWF profile
Medal record
Women's badminton
Representing Hungary
European Junior Championships
Bronze medal – third place	2018 Tallinn	Girls' singles

Réka Madarász (born 2 July 2000) is a Hungarian badminton player who competes in international level events. She is a bronze medalist at the European U17 Badminton Championships in 2016.

== Achievements ==
=== European Junior Championships ===
Girls' singles
Year	Venue	Opponent	Score	Result
2018	Kalev Sports Hall; Tallinn, Estonia	(Denmark) Line Christophersen	19–21, 19–21	Bronze

=== BWF International ===
Women's singles
Year	Tournament	Opponent	Score	Result
2019	Czech Open	(England) Abigail Holden	14–21, 21–18, 15–21	(silver) Runner-up
2019	Cyprus International	(Switzerland) Jenjira Stadelmann	11–21, 17–21	(silver) Runner-up

BWF International Challenge tournament
BWF International Series tournament
BWF Future Series tournament
