= Petra Polanc =

Slovenian badminton player (born 2000)

Personal information
- Born: 17 August 2000 (age 26)
- Height: 1.67 m (5 ft 6 in)
- Weight: 63 kg (139 lb)

Sport
- Country: Slovenia
- Sport: Badminton

Women's singles & doubles
- Highest ranking: 116 (WS 6 June 2023); 136 (WD with Nika Arih 13 April 2017); 58 (XD with Miha Ivančič 26 September 2023)
- Current ranking: 155 (WS); 67 (XD with Miha Ivančič) (2 January 2024)
- BWF profile

Petra Polanc (born 17 August 2000) is a Slovenian badminton player. She participated at the 2018 Summer Youth Olympics in Buenos Aires, Argentina.

== Achievements ==
=== BWF International Challenge/Series (4 titles, 6 runners-up) ===
Women's singles
| Year | Tournament | Opponent | Score | Result |
|---|---|---|---|---|
| 2022 | Santo Domingo Open | (Italy) Yasmine Hamza | 11–21, 9–21 | (silver) Runner-up |

Women's doubles
| Year | Tournament | Partner | Opponent | Score | Result |
|---|---|---|---|---|---|
| 2015 | Slovak Open | (Slovenia) Nika Arih | (Netherlands) Gayle Mahulette (Netherlands) Cheryl Seinen | 13–21, 16–21 | (silver) Runner-up |

Mixed doubles
| Year | Tournament | Partner | Opponent | Score | Result |
|---|---|---|---|---|---|
| 2018 | Slovenia Future Series | (Slovenia) Miha Ivančič | (France) Louis Ducrot (France) Candice Lesne | 21–15, 21–13 | (gold) Winner |
| 2019 | Slovenia Future Series | (Slovenia) Miha Ivančič | (Denmark) Kristoffer Knudsen (Denmark) Elisa Melgaard | 21–12, 21–14 | (gold) Winner |
| 2020 | Bulgarian International | (Slovenia) Miha Ivančič | (Bulgaria) Iliyan Stoynov (Bulgaria) Hristomira Popovska | Walkover | (silver) Runner-up |
| 2022 | Slovenia Future Series | (Slovenia) Miha Ivančič | (Serbia) Mihajlo Tomić (Serbia) Andjela Vitman | 12–21, 20–22 | (silver) Runner-up |
| 2023 | Cameroon International | (Slovenia) Miha Ivančič | (Algeria) Koceila Mammeri (Algeria) Tanina Mammeri | 17–21, 17–21 | (silver) Runner-up |
| 2023 | Lagos International | (Slovenia) Miha Ivančič | (Peru) José Guevara (Peru) Inés Castillo | 17–21, 15–21 | (silver) Runner-up |
| 2024 | Slovenia Future Series | (Slovenia) Miha Ivančič | (Italy) David Salutt (Italy) Martina Corsini | 21–17, 21–15 | (gold) Winner |
| 2025 | Slovenia Future Series | (Slovenia) Miha Ivančič | (Switzerland) Yann Orteu (Switzerland) Caroline Racloz | 21–13, 16–21, 21–13 | (gold) Winner |

BWF International Challenge tournament
BWF International Series tournament
BWF Future Series tournament
