= Estonian National Badminton Championships =

The Estonian National Badminton Championships is a tournament organized to crown the best badminton players in Estonia. They are held since the season 1965.

== Past winners ==
Year	Men's singles	Women's singles	Men's doubles	Women's doubles	Mixed doubles
1965	Jüri Tarto	Hele-Mall Pajumägi	Jüri Tarto; Raivo Kristianson	Hele-Mall Pajumägi; Malle Mõistlik	Ülo Nurges; Hele-Mall Pajumägi
1966	Jüri Tarto	Reet Valgmaa	Jaak Nuuter; Ülo Nurges	Reet Valgmaa; Tiina Gens	Heino Aunin; Reet Valgmaa
1967	Jaak Nuuter	Reet Valgmaa	Jaak Nuuter; Toomas Sander	Reet Valgmaa; Riina Valgmaa	Heino Aunin; Reet Valgmaa
1968	Jaak Nuuter	Reet Valgmaa	Jaak Nuuter; Alar Kivilo	Reet Valgmaa; Riina Valgmaa	Alar Kivilo; Reet Valgmaa
1969	Jaak Nuuter	Reet Valgmaa	Jaak Nuuter; Urmas Pau	Reet Valgmaa; Riina Valgmaa	Boris Bogovski; Reet Valgmaa
1970	Jaak Nuuter	Reet Valgmaa	Boris Bogovski; Alar Kivilo	Reet Valgmaa; Marika Lemming	Boris Bogovski; Reet Valgmaa
1971	Jüri Tarto	Riina Valgmaa	Jaak Nuuter; Heino Aunin	Reet Valgmaa; Mariann Siliksaar	Jaak Nuuter; Mare Matsalu
1972	Boris Bogovski	Riina Valgmaa	Jaak Nuuter; Boris Bogovski	Reet Valgmaa; Tiina Staak	Boris Bogovski; Reet Valgmaa
1973	Jüri Tarto	Reet Valgmaa	Jaak Nuuter; Boris Bogovski	Reet Valgmaa; Skaidrite Nurges	Alfred Kivisaar; Riina Valgmaa
1974	Jaak Nuuter	Reet Valgmaa	Jaak Nuuter; Boris Bogovski	Reet Valgmaa; Marika Dolotova	Boris Bogovski; Reet Valgmaa
1975	Alfred Kivisaar	Marika Dolotova	Alfred Kivisaar; Toivo Raudver	Reet Valgmaa; Marika Dolotova	Alfred Kivisaar; Riina Valgmaa
1976	Alfred Kivisaar	Reet Valgmaa	Alfred Kivisaar; Toivo Raudver	Reet Valgmaa; Riina Valgmaa	Mart Siliksaar; Reet Valgmaa
1977	Alfred Kivisaar	Reet Valgmaa	Alfred Kivisaar; Toivo Raudver	Reet Valgmaa; Riina Valgmaa	Mart Siliksaar; Reet Valgmaa
1978	Peeter Pajumägi	Reet Valgmaa	Alfred Kivisaar; Toivo Raudver	Reet Valgmaa; Riina Valgmaa	Mart Siliksaar; Reet Valgmaa
1979	Aleksander Adojaan	Mare Reinberg	Jüri Tarto; Peeter Ärmpalu	Mare Reinberg; Marina Rajevskaja	Alfred Kivisaar; Mare Reinberg
1980	Tiit Vapper	Mare Reinberg	Alfred Kivisaar; Toivo Raudver	Katrin Paeväli; Ann Avarlaid	Argo Aru; Katrin Paeväli
1981	Henry Aljand	Mare Reinberg	Henry Aljand; Peeter Sepma	Mare Reinberg; Marina Rajevskaja	Alfred Kivisaar; Mare Reinberg
1982	Tiit Vapper	Mare Reinberg	Henry Aljand; Peeter Munitsõn	Mare Reinberg; Marina Rajevskaja	Kalle Kaljurand; Ann Avarlaid
1983	Peeter Munitsõn	Ann Avarlaid	Ain Matvere; Peeter Munitsõn	Mare Reinberg; Marina Rajevskaja	Kalle Kaljurand; Ann Avarlaid
1984	Ain Matvere	Mare Reinberg	Kalle Kaljurand; Ivar Kask	Mare Reinberg; Ann Avarlaid	Peeter Ärmpalu; Mare Reinberg
1985	Kalle Kaljurand	Mare Reinberg	Kalle Kaljurand; Ivar Kask	Terje Lall; Anneli Lambing	Peeter Ärmpalu; Mare Reinberg
1986	Andres Ojamaa	Mare Reinberg	Peeter Munitsõn; Andres Ojamaa	Mare Reinberg; Marina Kaljurand	Peeter Munitsõn; Mare Reinberg
1987	Andres Ojamaa	Terje Lall	Andres Ojamaa; Peeter Lust	Terje Lall; Anneli Lambing	Peeter Munitsõn; Mare Reinberg
1988	Andres Ojamaa	Anneli Lambing	Andres Ojamaa; Peeter Munitsõn	Terje Lall; Anneli Lambing	Kalle Kaljurand; Marina Kaljurand
1989	Andres Ojamaa	Anneli Lambing	Andres Ojamaa; Peeter Munitsõn	Anneli Lambing; Maili Karindi	Ain Matvere; Anneli Lambing
1990	Ain Matvere	Anneli Lambing	Ain Matvere; Kalle Kaljurand	Anneli Lambing; Maili Karindi	Ain Matvere; Anneli Lambing
1991	Andres Ojamaa	Marina Kaljurand	Ain Matvere; Kalle Kaljurand	Liia Dubkovskaja; Marju Velga	Ain Matvere; Terje Lall
1992	Andres Ojamaa	Kairi Viilup	Einar Veede; Raul Tikk	Terje Lall; Margit Nahk	Andres Ojamaa; Kairi Viilup
1993	Heiki Sorge	Terje Lall	Einar Veede; Raul Tikk	Marju Velga; Liia Dubkovskaja	Andres Ojamaa; Kairi Viilup
1994	Heiki Sorge	Liia Dubkovskaja	Einar Veede; Raul Tikk	Mari Toomingas; Kairi Viilup	Raul Tikk; Anneli Parts
1995	Heiki Sorge	Liia Dubkovskaja	Einar Veede; Raul Tikk	Mari Toomingas; Liia Dubkovskaja	Raul Tikk; Anneli Parts
1996	Heiki Sorge	Kelli Vilu	Einar Veede; Raul Tikk	Kelli Vilu; Kati Kraaving	Einar Veede; Mare Pedanik
1997	Heiki Sorge	Kelli Vilu	Heiki Sorge; Meelis Maiste	Piret Kärt; Liia Dubkovskaja	Einar Veede; Mare Pedanik
1998	Heiki Sorge	Kairi Saks	Meelis Maiste; Indrek Kuuts	Kelli Vilu; Kati Kraaving	Meelis Maiste; Kairi Saks
1999	Heiki Sorge	Piret Hamer	Heiki Sorge; Peeter Munitsõn	Kairi Saks; Eve Jugandi	Meelis Maiste; Kairi Saks
2000	Heiki Sorge	Kati Tolmoff	Heiki Sorge; Peeter Munitsõn	Ulla Helm; Eve Jugandi	Meelis Maiste; Kairi Saks
2001	Heiki Sorge	Kati Tolmoff	Meelis Maiste; Indrek Kuuts	Piret Hamer; Helen Reino	Heiki Sorge; Kati Tolmoff
2002	Heiki Sorge	Kati Tolmoff	Meelis Maiste; Indrek Kuuts	Piret Hamer; Helen Reino	Heiki Sorge; Kati Tolmoff
2003	Heiki Sorge	Helen Reino	Heike Sorge; Andres Aru	Kati Tolmoff; Kai-Riin Saluste	Indrek Küüts; Kati Tolmoff
2004	Heiki Sorge	Kati Tolmoff	Indrek Küüts; Meelis Maiste	Piret Hamer; Helen Reino	Indrek Küüts; Piret Hamer
2005	Heiki Sorge	Kati Tolmoff	Raul Must; Ants Mängel	Piret Hamer; Helen Reino	Andres Aru; Kati Kraaving
2006	Raul Must	Kati Tolmoff	Raul Must; Ants Mängel	Kati Tolmoff; Sandra Kamilova	Ants Mängel; Karoliine Hõim
2007	Raul Must	Kati Tolmoff	Raul Must; Ants Mängel	Helen Reino; Kai-Riin Saluste	Ants Mängel; Karoliine Hõim
2008	Raul Must	Kati Tolmoff	Indrek Küüts; Meelis Maiste	Kati Tolmoff; Ana Linnamägi	Heiki Sorge; Helen Reino
2009	Raul Must	Kati Tolmoff	Raul Must; Ants Mängel	Kati Tolmoff; Helen Reino	Ants Mängel; Karoliine Hõim
2010	Raul Must	Karoliine Hõim	Raul Must; Ants Mängel	Karoliine Hõim; Laura Vana	Ants Mängel; Karoliine Hõim
2011	Raul Must	Karoliine Hõim	Raul Must; Ingmar Seidelberg	Karoliine Hõim; Laura Vana	Ants Mängel; Karoliine Hõim
2012	Raul Must	Kati Tolmoff	Kristjan Kaljurand; Robert Kasela	Kati Tolmoff; Laura Vana	Raul Must; Kati Tolmoff
2013	Raul Must	Karoliine Hõim	Kristjan Kaljurand; Robert Kasela	Karoliine Hõim; Laura Vana	Mihkel Laanes; Kristin Kuuba
2014	Raul Must	Kati Tolmoff	Karl Kivinurm; Vahur Lukin	Kristin Kuuba; Helina Rüütel	Raul Must; Kati Tolmoff
2015	Raul Must	Kati Tolmoff	Kristjan Kaljurand; Raul Käsner	Karoliine Hõim; Kati Tolmoff	Raul Must; Kati Tolmoff
2016	Raul Must	Kati Tolmoff	Kristjan Kaljurand; Raul Käsner	Kati-Kreet Marran; Sale-Liis Teesalu	Raul Käsner; Helina Rüütel
2017	Raul Must	Kristin Kuuba	Kristjan Kaljurand; Raul Käsner	Kristin Kuuba; Helina Rüütel	Mihkel Laanes; Helina Rüütel
2018	Raul Must	Kristin Kuuba	Kristjan Kaljurand; Raul Käsner	Kati-Kreet Marran; Kristin Kuuba	Kristjan Kaljurand; Hannaliina Piho
2019	Raul Must	Kristin Kuuba	Kristjan Kaljurand; Raul Käsner	Kristin Kuuba; Helina Rüütel	Kristjan Kaljurand; Hannaliina Piho
2020	Raul Must	Kristin Kuuba	Kristjan Kaljurand; Raul Käsner	Kati-Kreet Marran; Kristin Kuuba	Mihkel Laanes; Kristin Kuuba
2021	Raul Must	Kristin Kuuba	Kristjan Kaljurand; Raul Käsner	Kristin Kuuba; Kati Tolmoff	Raul Must; Kristin Kuuba
2022	Raul Must	Kristin Kuuba	Kristjan Kaljurand; Raul Käsner	Kati-Kreet Marran; Helina Rüütel	Raul Käsner; Kati-Kreet Marran
2023	Karl Kert	Kristin Kuuba	Kristjan Kaljurand; Raul Käsner	Kati-Kreet Marran; Helina Rüütel	Raul Käsner; Kati-Kreet Marran
2024	Tauri Kilk	Helis Pajuste	Karl Kert; Tauri Kilk	Catlyn Kruus; Ramona Üprus	Kristjan Kaljurand; Helina Rüütel
2025	Tauri Kilk	Kristin Kuuba	Karl Kert; Tauri Kilk	Kati-Kreet Marran; Helina Rüütel	Kristjan Kaljurand; Helina Rüütel
