= 2018 European Badminton Championships =

Tournament details
- Dates: 24–29 April 2018
- Venue: Palacio de los Deportes Carolina Marín
- Location: Huelva, Spain

Champions
- Men's singles: (Denmark) Viktor Axelsen
- Women's singles: (Spain) Carolina Marín
- Men's doubles: (Denmark) Kim Astrup (Denmark) Anders Skaarup Rasmussen
- Women's doubles: (Bulgaria) Gabriela Stoeva (Bulgaria) Stefani Stoeva
- Mixed doubles: (England) Chris Adcock (England) Gabrielle Adcock

The 2018 European Badminton Championships were the 27th tournament of the European Badminton Championships. They were held in Huelva, Spain, from 24 to 29 April 2018.

== Tournament ==
The 2018 European Badminton Championships is the 27th edition of the championships. This tournament was awarded to Carolina Marín's hometown Huelva following a decision adopted by the executive committee of Badminton Europe and made public at the General Assembly of the aforementioned organization that took place in Prague, Czech Republic. The candidature led by the Spanish Badminton Federation in collaboration with the city of Huelva, the Regional Government of Andalusia, the Deputation of Huelva and the Andalusian Badminton Federation will organize the European Championships to be played between 24 and 29 April 2018.

The tournament consist of men's (singles and doubles), women's (singles and doubles), and also mixed doubles. 300 athletes from 25 countries will compete in this tournament.

=== Venue ===
The tournament will be held at the Palacio de Deportes de Huelva, Spain, also known as Carolina Marín Sports Hall – a facility dedicated to the Spanish badminton player who has managed to find her place on a podium usually taken by Asians. The Principe de Asturias Sports Hall in University of Huelva will be used as training section.

=== Point distribution ===
Below is the tables with the point distribution for each phase of the tournament based on the BWF points system for the European Badminton Championships.

Champion	Runner-up	3/4	5/8	9/16	17/32	33/64
7,000	5,950	4,900	3,850	2,750	1,670	660

== Medal summary ==
=== Medalists ===
Event	Gold	Silver	Bronze
Men's singles	(Denmark) Viktor Axelsen	(England) Rajiv Ouseph	(France) Brice Leverdez
Men's singles	(Denmark) Viktor Axelsen	(England) Rajiv Ouseph	(Denmark) Jan Ø. Jørgensen
Women's singles	(Spain) Carolina Marín	(Russia) Evgeniya Kosetskaya	(Denmark) Mia Blichfeldt
Women's singles	(Spain) Carolina Marín	(Russia) Evgeniya Kosetskaya	(Denmark) Line Kjærsfeldt
Men's doubles	(Denmark) Kim Astrup (Denmark) Anders Skaarup Rasmussen	(Denmark) Mads Conrad-Petersen (Denmark) Mads Pieler Kolding	(Netherlands) Jelle Maas (Netherlands) Robin Tabeling
Men's doubles	(Denmark) Kim Astrup (Denmark) Anders Skaarup Rasmussen	(Denmark) Mads Conrad-Petersen (Denmark) Mads Pieler Kolding	(Russia) Vladimir Ivanov (Russia) Ivan Sozonov
Women's doubles	(Bulgaria) Gabriela Stoeva (Bulgaria) Stefani Stoeva	(France) Émilie Lefel (France) Anne Tran	(Netherlands) Selena Piek (Netherlands) Cheryl Seinen
Women's doubles	(Bulgaria) Gabriela Stoeva (Bulgaria) Stefani Stoeva	(France) Émilie Lefel (France) Anne Tran	(Denmark) Maiken Fruergaard (Denmark) Sara Thygesen
Mixed doubles	(England) Chris Adcock (England) Gabrielle Adcock	(Denmark) Mathias Christiansen (Denmark) Christinna Pedersen	(Germany) Mark Lamsfuß (Germany) Isabel Herttrich
Mixed doubles	(England) Chris Adcock (England) Gabrielle Adcock	(Denmark) Mathias Christiansen (Denmark) Christinna Pedersen	(England) Marcus Ellis (England) Lauren Smith

=== Medal table ===
Rank	Nation	Gold	Silver	Bronze	Total
1	Denmark	2	2	4	8
2	England	1	1	1	3
3	Bulgaria	1	0	0	1
3	Spain*	1	0	0	1
5	France	0	1	1	2
5	Russia	0	1	1	2
7	Netherlands	0	0	2	2
8	Germany	0	0	1	1
Totals (8 entries)		5	5	10	20

== Men's singles ==
=== Seeds ===
1. (Denmark) Viktor Axelsen (champion)
2. (Denmark) Anders Antonsen (quarterfinals)
3. (England) Rajiv Ouseph (final)
4. (France) Brice Leverdez (semifinals)
5. (Denmark) Rasmus Gemke (quarterfinals)
6. (Netherlands) Mark Caljouw (third round)
7. (Spain) Pablo Abián (second round)
8. (France) Lucas Corvée (quarterfinals)

=== Wild card ===
Badminton Europe (BEC) awarded a wild card entry to Jan Ø. Jørgensen of Denmark.

=== Finals ===
Semifinals
1	(Denmark) Viktor Axelsen	21	21
4	(France) Brice Leverdez	7	9
3	(England) Rajiv Ouseph	21	18	21
WC	(Denmark) Jan Ø. Jørgensen	17	21	15

Final
1	(Denmark) Viktor Axelsen	21	21
3	(England) Rajiv Ouseph	8	7

=== Top half ===
==== Section 1 ====
First round
(Portugal) D N Anjo	14	14
(Czech Republic) A Mendrek	21	21
(England) S Parsons	21	23
(Austria) L Wraber	19	21
(Finland) K Koljonen	18	21	16
(Germany) A Roovers	21	14	21
(Hungary) G Krausz	21	21
(Italy) R Maddaloni	18	18

Second round
1	(Denmark) V Axelsen	21	21
(Czech Republic) A Mendrek	11	8
(Belgium) M Moreels
(England) S Parsons	w	/	o
5	(Denmark) R Gemke	21	21
(Germany) A Roovers	9	15
(Russia) V Malkov	21	21
(Hungary) G Krausz	11	9

Third round
1	(Denmark) V Axelsen	21	21
(England) S Parsons	13	9
5	(Denmark) R Gemke	21	21
(Russia) V Malkov	13	18

Quarterfinals
1	(Denmark) V Axelsen	21	21
5	(Denmark) R Gemke	11	16

==== Section 2 ====
First round
(Romania) C V Filimon	21	16	21
(Cyprus) E Nicolaou	8	21	11
(Luxembourg) R Mann	14	15
(Turkey) E Lale	21	21
(Iceland) K Gunnarsson	16	17
(Republic of Ireland) N Nguyễn	21	21
(Malta) M Abela	1	5
(Netherlands) N Fransman	21	21

Second round
4	(France) B Leverdez	17	21	21
(Romania) C V Filimon	21	16	15
(Estonia) R Must	21	21
(Turkey) E Lale	19	16
7	(Spain) P Abián	9	18
(Republic of Ireland) N Nguyễn	21	21
(Norway) M Myhre	13	9
(Netherlands) N Fransman	21	21

Third round
4	(France) B Leverdez	21	21
(Estonia) R Must	16	16
(Republic of Ireland) N Nguyễn	21	17	19
(Netherlands) N Fransman	14	21	21

Quarterfinals
4	(France) B Leverdez	22	21	21
(Netherlands) N Fransman	24	15	15

=== Bottom half ===
==== Section 3 ====
First round
(Sweden) J Nilsson	21	22
(Germany) K Schäfer	14	20
(Switzerland) C Kirchmayr	21	22
(Moldova) C Savin	17	20
(Bulgaria) I Rusev	12	18
(Ukraine) A Pochtarov	21	21
(Croatia) Z Đurkinjak	19	21	13
(Spain) L E Peñalver	21	13	21

Second round
(Sweden) J Nilsson	21	21
(Slovakia) M Dratva	16	10
(Switzerland) C Kirchmayr	16	11
8	(France) L Corvée	21	21
(Ukraine) A Pochtarov	21	12	21
(Finland) E Heino	17	21	12
(Spain) L E Peñalver	19	8
3	(England) R Ouseph	21	21

Third round
(Sweden) J Nilsson	21	9	14
8	(France) L Corvée	19	21	21
(Ukraine) A Pochtarov
3	(England) R Ouseph	w	/	o

Quarterfinals
8	(France) L Corvée	21	18	11
3	(England) R Ouseph	16	21	21

==== Section 4 ====
First round
(Azerbaijan) O Galandarov	3	7
WC	(Denmark) J Ø. Jørgensen	21	21
(Russia) S Sirant	21	21
(Czech Republic) M Ludík	11	11
(Greece) I Xanthou	11	10
(Slovenia) M Ivanič	21	21
(England) T Penty	21	21
(France) L Claerbout	10	7

Second round
WC	(Denmark) J Ø. Jørgensen	21	21
(Poland) M Rogalski	9	15
(Russia) S Sirant	19	19
6	(Netherlands) M Caljouw	21	21
(Slovenia) M Ivanič	10	8
(Israel) M Zilberman	21	21
(England) T Penty	12	21	20
2	(Denmark) A Antonsen	21	15	22

Third round
WC	(Denmark) J Ø. Jørgensen	21	21
6	(Netherlands) M Caljouw	19	18
(Israel) M Zilberman	15	21	10
2	(Denmark) A Antonsen	21	19	21

Quarterfinals
WC	(Denmark) J Ø. Jørgensen	w	/	o
2	(Denmark) A Antonsen

== Women's singles ==
=== Seeds ===
1. (Spain) Carolina Marín (champion)
2. (Scotland) Kirsty Gilmour (quarterfinals)
3. (Denmark) Mia Blichfeldt (semifinals)
4. (Russia) Evgeniya Kosetskaya (final)
5. (Spain) Beatriz Corrales (second round)
6. (Denmark) Line Kjærsfeldt (semifinals)
7. (Denmark) Natalia Koch Rohde (quarterfinals)
8. (Turkey) Neslihan Yiğit (third round)

=== Wild card ===
Badminton Europe (BEC) awarded a wild card entry to Sara Peñalver Pereira of Spain.

=== Finals ===
Semifinals
1	(Spain) Carolina Marín	21	21
3	(Denmark) Mia Blichfeldt	17	16
4	(Russia) Evgeniya Kosetskaya	21	21
6	(Denmark) Line Kjærsfeldt	10	14

Final
1	(Spain) Carolina Marín	21	21
4	(Russia) Evgeniya Kosetskaya	15	7

=== Top half ===
==== Section 1 ====
First round
(Russia) N Perminova	17	21	17
(Switzerland) S Jaquet	21	13	21
(Bulgaria) M Mitsova	21	16	21
(Czech Republic) Z Pavelková	12	21	9
(Belgium) L Tan	21	21
(Hungary) Á Kőrösi	19	19

Second round
1	(Spain) C Marín	21	21
(France) M Batomene	15	12
(Netherlands) S de V Eijbergen	21	19	16
(Switzerland) S Jaquet	12	21	21
7	(Denmark) N K Rohde	21	21
(Bulgaria) M Mitsova	15	17
WC	(Spain) S Peñalver	21	21
(Belgium) L Tan	18	16

Third round
1	(Spain) C Marín	21	21
(Switzerland) S Jaquet	14	7
7	(Denmark) N K Rohde	21	21
WC	(Spain) S Peñalver	11	19

Quarterfinals
1	(Spain) C Marín	21	21
7	(Denmark) N K Rohde	17	10

==== Section 2 ====
First round
(Ukraine) N Voytsekh	21	21
(Lithuania) V Fomkinaite	15	18
(Slovakia) M Repiská	12	10
(Finland) A Mikkelä	21	21
(Germany) F Deprez	21	21
(Israel) D Danilenko	15	11
(Cyprus) E Christodoulou	6	3
(Germany) Y Li	21	21

Second round
3	(Denmark) M Blichfeldt	21	21
(Ukraine) N Voytsekh	14	9
(Slovenia) L Salehar	14	11
(Finland) A Mikkelä	21	21
8	(Turkey) N Yiğit	21	21
(Germany) F Deprez	14	15
(Estonia) G Saar	9	9
(Germany) Y Li	21	21

Third round
3	(Denmark) M Blichfeldt	21	21
(Finland) A Mikkelä	15	13
8	(Turkey) N Yiğit	6	7
(Germany) Y Li	21	21

Quarterfinals
3	(Denmark) M Blichfeldt	28	21
(Germany) Y Li	26	12

=== Bottom half ===
==== Section 3 ====
First round
(Bulgaria) L Zetchiri	19	17
(Germany) L Heim	21	21
(England) C Birch	21	21
(Croatia) M Pavlinić	18	11
(Portugal) S Goncalves	21	11	8^{r}
(Estonia) K Kuuba	18	21	15
(Wales) J Hart	20	21	14
(Ukraine) M Ulitina	22	19	21

Second round
(Germany) L Heim	21	21
(Republic of Ireland) R Darragh	9	10
(England) C Birch	21	21
5	(Spain) B Corrales	16	19
(Estonia) K Kuuba	21	21
(Latvia) I Pope	7	14
(Ukraine) M Ulitina	20	14
4	(Russia) E Kosetskaya	22	21

Third round
(Germany) L Heim	21	15	0^{r}
(England) C Birch	19	21	0
(Estonia) K Kuuba	13	20
4	(Russia) E Kosetskaya	21	22

Quarterfinals
(England) C Birch	14	12
4	(Russia) E Kosetskaya	21	21

==== Section 4 ====
First round
(Spain) C Azurmendi
(Turkey) A Demirbağ	w	/	o
(Switzerland) A Huser	21	19	19
(Belarus) A Zaitsava	19	21	21
(Czech Republic) K Tomalová	16	15
(Netherlands) G Mahulette	21	21
(Denmark) M Poulsen	21	21
(Norway) E Wiborg	7	10

Second round
(Turkey) A Demirbağ	21	21
(Greece) G Sotiriou	19	7
(Belarus) A Zaitsava	12	21	12
6	(Denmark) L Kjærsfeldt	21	14	21
(Netherlands) G Mahulette	21	21
(Sweden) J Magnusson	10	17
(Denmark) M Poulsen	18	17
2	(Scotland) K Gilmour	21	21

Third round
(Turkey) A Demirbağ	14	16
6	(Denmark) L Kjærsfeldt	21	21
(Netherlands) G Mahulette	11	13
2	(Scotland) K Gilmour	21	21

Quarterfinals
6	(Denmark) L Kjærsfeldt	21	21
2	(Scotland) K Gilmour	14	16

== Men's doubles ==
=== Seeds ===
1. (Denmark) Mathias Boe / Carsten Mogensen (withdrew)
2. (Denmark) Mads Conrad-Petersen / Mads Pieler Kolding (final)
3. (Denmark) Kim Astrup / Anders Skaarup Rasmussen (champions)
4. (Russia) Vladimir Ivanov / Ivan Sozonov (semifinals)
5. (England) Marcus Ellis / Chris Langridge (quarterfinals)
6. (Denmark) David Daugaard / Mathias Christiansen (quarterfinals)
7. (Germany) Jones Ralfy Jansen / Josche Zurwonne (quarterfinals)
8. (Germany) Mark Lamsfuß / Marvin Emil Seidel (quarterfinals)

=== Finals ===
Semifinals

Final

- (Netherlands) Jelle Maas
- (Netherlands) Robin Tabeling
15
18

3
- (Denmark) Kim Astrup
- (Denmark) Anders Skaarup Rasmussen
21
21

3
- (Denmark) Kim Astrup
- (Denmark) Anders Skaarup Rasmussen
21
0

2
- (Denmark) Mads Conrad-Petersen
- (Denmark) Mads Pieler Kolding
15
0^{r}

4
- (Russia) Vladimir Ivanov
- (Russia) Ivan Sozonov
11
21
19

2
- (Denmark) Mads Conrad-Petersen
- (Denmark) Mads Pieler Kolding
21
19
21

=== Top half ===
==== Section 1 ====
First round

Second round

Quarterfinals

1
- (Denmark) M Boe
- (Denmark) C Mogensen

- (England) B Lane
- (England) S Vendy
w
/
o

- (England) B Lane
- (England) S Vendy
22
12

- (Netherlands) J Maas
- (Netherlands) R Tabeling
24
21

- (Netherlands) J Maas
- (Netherlands) R Tabeling
21
19
29

- (Scotland) A Dunn
- (Scotland) A Hall
16
21
27

- (Netherlands) J Maas
- (Netherlands) R Tabeling
21
21

7
- (Germany) J R Jansen
- (Germany) J Zurwonne
19
13

7
- (Germany) J R Jansen
- (Germany) J Zurwonne
21
21

- (Slovakia) M Dratva
- (Slovakia) M Hliničan
10
11

7
- (Germany) J R Jansen
- (Germany) J Zurwonne
17
24
22

- (Russia) E Dremin
- (Russia) D Grachev
21
22
20

- (Russia) E Dremin
- (Russia) D Grachev
21
21
22

- (France) E Adam
- (France) S Corvee
23
15
20

==== Section 2 ====
First round

Second round

Quarterfinals

3
- (Denmark) K Astrup
- (Denmark) A S Rasmussen
21
21

- (Belgium) M Dierickx
- (Belgium) F Golinski
14
12

3
- (Denmark) K Astrup
- (Denmark) A S Rasmussen
21
21

- (Bulgaria) P Boichinov
- (Bulgaria) I Panev
11
11

- (Bulgaria) P Boichinov
- (Bulgaria) I Panev
21
21

- (Israel) A Bass
- (Israel) S Geffen
12
17

3
- (Denmark) K Astrup
- (Denmark) A S Rasmussen
21
20
21

5
- (England) M Ellis
- (England) C Langridge
8
22
16

5
- (England) M Ellis
- (England) C Langridge
21
21

- (Italy) L Osele
- (Italy) K Strobl
12
17

5
- (England) M Ellis
- (England) C Langridge
21
21

- (Russia) K Abramov
- (Russia) A Zinchenko
12
17

- (Poland) P Prądziński
- (Poland) J Rudziński
13
18

- (Russia) K Abramov
- (Russia) A Zinchenko
21
21

=== Bottom half ===
==== Section 3 ====
First round

Second round

Quarterfinals

- (Estonia) K Kaljurand
- (Estonia) R Kasner
22
20
12

- (Republic of Ireland) Nguyễn N
- (Republic of Ireland) P Reynolds
20
22
21

- (Republic of Ireland) Nguyễn N
- (Republic of Ireland) P Reynolds
12
7

6
- (Denmark) M Christiansen
- (Denmark) D Daugaard
21
21

- (Netherlands) J Arends
- (Netherlands) R Jille
21
15
22

6
- (Denmark) M Christiansen
- (Denmark) D Daugaard
15
21
24

6
- (Denmark) M Christiansen
- (Denmark) D Daugaard
15
19

4
- (Russia) V Ivanov
- (Russia) I Sozonov
21
21

- (Norway) M Christensen
- (Norway) F Kristensen
12
12

- (Poland) M Bochat
- (Poland) A Cwalina
21
21

- (Poland) M Bochat
- (Poland) A Cwalina
19
10

4
- (Russia) V Ivanov
- (Russia) I Sozonov
21
21

- (Latvia) D Stipsits
- (Latvia) R Zirnwald
14
14

4
- (Russia) V Ivanov
- (Russia) I Sozonov
21
21

==== Section 4 ====
First round

Second round

Quarterfinals

- (France) T Gicquel
- (France) R Labar
21
21

- (Germany) D Benz
- (Germany) A Heinz
19
18

- (France) T Gicquel
- (France) R Labar
16
8

8
- (Germany) M Lamsfuß
- (Germany) M E Seidel
21
21

WC
- (Spain) J Suárez
- (Spain) A Zapico
9
11

8
- (Germany) M Lamsfuß
- (Germany) M E Seidel
21
21

8
- (Germany) M Lamsfuß
- (Germany) M E Seidel
21
15
18

2
- (Denmark) M C-Petersen
- (Denmark) M P Kolding
13
21
21

- (England) P Briggs
- (England) T Wolfenden
21
21

- (Italy) G Greco
- (Italy) R Maddaloni
13
10

- (England) P Briggs
- (England) T Wolfenden
20
13

2
- (Denmark) M C-Petersen
- (Denmark) M P Kolding
22
21

- (Bulgaria) D Nikolov
- (Bulgaria) I Rusev
13
12

2
- (Denmark) M C-Petersen
- (Denmark) M P Kolding
21
21

== Women's doubles ==
=== Seeds ===
1. (Denmark) Kamilla Rytter Juhl / Christinna Pedersen (withdrew)
2. (Bulgaria) Gabriela Stoeva / Stefani Stoeva (champions)
3. (Denmark) Maiken Fruergaard / Sara Thygesen (semifinals)
4. (England) Lauren Smith / Sarah Walker (quarterfinals)
5. (Netherlands) Selena Piek / Cheryl Seinen (semifinals)
6. (France) Émilie Lefel / Anne Tran (final)
7. (Germany) Isabel Herttrich / Carla Nelte (first round)
8. (England) Chloe Birch / Jessica Pugh (quarterfinals)

=== Wild card ===
Badminton Europe (BEC) awarded a wild card entry to Olga Konon and Linda Efler of Germany.

=== Finals ===
Semifinals

Final

6
- (France) Émilie Lefel
- (France) Anne Tran
17
21
21

5
- (Netherlands) Selena Piek
- (Netherlands) Cheryl Seinen
21
18
19

6
- (France) Émilie Lefel
- (France) Anne Tran
12
10

2
- (Bulgaria) Gabriela Stoeva
- (Bulgaria) Stefani Stoeva
21
21

3
- (Denmark) Maiken Fruergaard
- (Denmark) Sara Thygesen
10
18

2
- (Bulgaria) Gabriela Stoeva
- (Bulgaria) Stefani Stoeva
21
21

=== Top half ===
==== Section 1 ====
First round

Second round

Quarterfinals

1
- (Denmark) K R Juhl
- (Denmark) C Pedersen

- (Turkey) B Ercetin
- (Turkey) N Inci
w
/
o

- (Turkey) B Ercetin
- (Turkey) N Inci
16
9

- (Russia) E Bolotova
- (Russia) A Davletova
21
21

- (Russia) E Bolotova
- (Russia) A Davletova
21
21

- (Slovenia) I Salehar
- (Slovenia) L Salehar
18
11

- (Russia) E Bolotova
- (Russia) A Davletova
18
11

6
- (France) É Lefel
- (France) A Tran
21
21

6
- (France) É Lefel
- (France) A Tran
21
21

- (Spain) E Fernández
- (Spain) L Usle
18
7

6
- (France) É Lefel
- (France) A Tran
21
21

- (Denmark) J Finne-Ipsen
- (Denmark) R Søby Hansen
15
12

- (Denmark) J Finne-Ipsen
- (Denmark) R Søby Hansen
21
21

- (Lithuania) V Fomkinaite
- (Lithuania) G Voitechovskaja
7
9

==== Section 2 ====
First round

Second round

Quarterfinals

4
- (England) L Smith
- (England) S Walker
21
21

- (Ukraine) M Ilyinskaya
- (Ukraine) Y Zharka
13
16

4
- (England) L Smith
- (England) S Walker
19
21
21

- (Sweden) E Karlsson
- (Sweden) J Magnusson
21
14
12

- (Belarus) A Cherniavskaya
- (Belarus) A Zaitsava
8
10

- (Sweden) E Karlsson
- (Sweden) J Magnusson
21
21

4
- (England) L Smith
- (England) S Walker
10
10

5
- (Netherlands) S Piek
- (Netherlands) C Seinen
21
21

5
- (Netherlands) S Piek
- (Netherlands) C Seinen
21
21

- (Latvia) I Pope
- (Latvia) M Radovska
13
10

5
- (Netherlands) S Piek
- (Netherlands) C Seinen
21
22

- (Germany) J Goliszewski
- (Germany) L Käpplein
16
20

- (Czech Republic) A Bášová
- (Czech Republic) M Fuchsova
11
14

- (Germany) J Goliszewski
- (Germany) L Käpplein
21
21

=== Bottom half ===
==== Section 3 ====
First round

Second round

Quarterfinals

- (Italy) S Garino
- (Italy) L Iversen
25
21

- (Norway) S F Jørgensen
- (Norway) N Syvertsen
23
11

- (Italy) S Garino
- (Italy) L Iversen
6
10

8
- (England) C Birch
- (England) J Pugh
21
21

- (Turkey) B Unlu
- (Turkey) E Yazgan
9
9

8
- (England) C Birch
- (England) J Pugh
21
21

8
- (England) C Birch
- (England) J Pugh
11
9

3
- (Denmark) M Fruergaard
- (Denmark) S Thygesen
21
21

- (Belgium) L Jaques
- (Belgium) F Vandenhoucke
14
11

- (France) D Delrue
- (France) L Palermo
21
21

- (France) D Delrue
- (France) L Palermo
19
10

3
- (Denmark) M Fruergaard
- (Denmark) S Thygesen
21
21

- (Estonia) K Kuuba
- (Estonia) H Rüütel
17
19

3
- (Denmark) M Fruergaard
- (Denmark) S Thygesen
21
21

==== Section 4 ====
First round

Second round

Quarterfinals

- (Finland) J Nyström
- (Finland) S Pekkola
21
15
21

- (Republic of Ireland) S Boyle
- (Republic of Ireland) R Darragh
15
21
16

- (Finland) J Nyström
- (Finland) S Pekkola
10
12

- (Netherlands) D Jille
- (Netherlands) I van der Aar
21
21

- (Netherlands) D Jille
- (Netherlands) I van der Aar
21
21

7
- (Germany) I Herttrich
- (Germany) C Nelte
13
15

- (Netherlands) D Jille
- (Netherlands) I van der Aar
8
6

2
- (Bulgaria) G Stoeva
- (Bulgaria) S Stoeva
21
21

- (Hungary) N Bukoviczki
- (Hungary) D Gonda
13
9

- (Sweden) A Högström
- (Sweden) C Nistad
21
21

- (Sweden) A Högström
- (Sweden) C Nistad
13
12

2
- (Bulgaria) G Stoeva
- (Bulgaria) S Stoeva
21
21

WC
- (Germany) L Efler
- (Germany) O Konon
16
15

2
- (Bulgaria) G Stoeva
- (Bulgaria) S Stoeva
21
21

== Mixed doubles ==
=== Seeds ===
1. (England) Chris Adcock / Gabrielle Adcock (champions)
2. (Denmark) Mathias Christiansen / Christinna Pedersen (final)
3. (England) Marcus Ellis / Lauren Smith (semifinals)
4. (Netherlands) Jacco Arends / Selena Piek (quarterfinals)
5. (Germany) Mark Lamsfuß / Isabel Herttrich (semifinals)
6. (Russia) Evgenij Dremin / Evgenia Dimova (quarterfinals)
7. (Germany) Marvin Emil Seidel / Linda Efler (quarterfinals)
8. (France) Ronan Labar / Audrey Fontaine (quarterfinals)

=== Wild card ===
Badminton Europe (BEC) awarded a wild card entry to Joachim Fischer Nielsen and Alexandra Bøje of Denmark.

=== Finals ===
Semifinals

Final

1
- (England) Chris Adcock
- (England) Gabrielle Adcock
21
15
25

5
- (Germany) Mark Lamsfuß
- (Germany) Isabel Herttrich
17
21
23

1
- (England) Chris Adcock
- (England) Gabrielle Adcock
21
17
21

2
- (Denmark) Mathias Christiansen
- (Denmark) Christinna Pedersen
18
21
18

3
- (England) Marcus Ellis
- (England) Lauren Smith
16
21
12

2
- (Denmark) Mathias Christiansen
- (Denmark) Christinna Pedersen
21
19
21

=== Top half ===
==== Section 1 ====
First round

Second round

Quarterfinals

1
- (England) C Adcock
- (England) G Adcock
21
21

- (Poland) P Śmiłowski
- (Poland) M Świerczyńska
16
10

1
- (England) C Adcock
- (England) G Adcock
21
21

WC
- (Denmark) J F Nielsen
- (Denmark) A Bøje
17
15

- (France) T Gicquel
- (France) D Delrue
16
21

WC
- (Denmark) J F Nielsen
- (Denmark) A Bøje
21
23

1
- (England) C Adcock
- (England) G Adcock
21
21

6
- (Russia) E Dremin
- (Russia) E Dimova
14
18

6
- (Russia) E Dremin
- (Russia) E Dimova
21
21

- (Bulgaria) D Yanakiev
- (Bulgaria) M Mitsova
16
7

6
- (Russia) E Dremin
- (Russia) E Dimova
21
21

- (France) B Kersaudy
- (France) L Palermo
18
15

- (Netherlands) J Maas
- (Netherlands) I van der Aar
21
12

- (France) B Kersaudy
- (France) L Palermo
23
21

==== Section 2 ====
First round

Second round

Quarterfinals

4
- (Netherlands) J Arends
- (Netherlands) S Piek
21
21

- (Switzerland) O Schaller
- (Switzerland) C Burkart
14
11

4
- (Netherlands) J Arends
- (Netherlands) S Piek
21
21

- (Slovakia) M Dratva
- (Slovakia) M Repiská
3
9

- (Slovakia) M Dratva
- (Slovakia) M Repiská
21
17
21

- (Austria) D Stipsits
- (Austria) A Meinke
17
21
15

4
- (Netherlands) J Arends
- (Netherlands) S Piek
21
10
16

5
- (Germany) M Lamsfuß
- (Germany) I Herttrich
19
21
21

5
- (Germany) M Lamsfuß
- (Germany) I Herttrich
21
21

- (Spain) A Zapico
- (Spain) L Usle
7
14

5
- (Germany) M Lamfuß
- (Germany) I Herttrich
21
23

- (Denmark) N Nøhr
- (Denmark) S Thygesen
9
21

- (Estonia) S Merits
- (Estonia) K-K Marran
9
11

- (Denmark) N Nøhr
- (Denmark) S Thygesen
21
21

=== Bottom half ===
==== Section 3 ====
First round

Second round

Quarterfinals

- (Israel) M Zilberman
- (Israel) S Zilberman
17
16

- (Finland) A Kaisti
- (Finland) J Nyström
21
21

- (Finland) A Kaisti
- (Finland) J Nyström
12
21
19

7
- (Germany) M E Seidel
- (Germany) L Efler
21
18
21

- (Ukraine) A Pochtarov
- (Ukraine) N Voytsekh
15
11

7
- (Germany) M E Seidel
- (Germany) L Efler
21
21

7
- (Germany) M E Seidel
- (Germany) L Efler
22
13

3
- (England) M Ellis
- (England) L Smith
24
21

- (Norway) F Kristensen
- (Norway) S F Jørgensen
9
13

- (Sweden) R Eidestedt
- (Sweden) C Nistad
21
21

- (Sweden) R Eidestedt
- (Sweden) C Nistad
11
16

3
- (England) M Ellis
- (England) L Smith
21
21

- (Netherlands) R Tabeling
- (Netherlands) C Seinen
21
11
15

3
- (England) M Ellis
- (England) L Smith
17
21
21

==== Section 4 ====
First round

Second round

Quarterfinals

- (Belarus) V Uladzizmir
- (Belarus) K Silich
6
13

- (Italy) K Strobl
- (Italy) S Garino
21
21

- (Italy) K Strobl
- (Italy) S Garino
16
9

8
- (France) R Labar
- (France) A Fontaine
21
21

- (Czech Republic) J Bitman
- (Czech Republic) A Bášová
15
17

8
- (France) R Labar
- (France) A Fontaine
21
21

8
- (France) R Labar
- (France) A Fontaine
16
18

2
- (Denmark) M Christiansen
- (Denmark) C Pedersen
21
21

- (England) B Lane
- (England) J Pugh
19
25

- (Russia) R Alimov
- (Russia) A Davletova
21
27

- (Russia) R Alimov
- (Russia) A Davletova
20
21
9

2
- (Denmark) M Christiansen
- (Denmark) C Pedersen
22
18
21

- (Republic of Ireland) S Magee
- (Republic of Ireland) C Magee
18
16

2
- (Denmark) M Christiansen
- (Denmark) C Pedersen
21
21
