= Estonia national badminton team =

National badminton team representing Estonia

Estonia
- Association: Eesti Sulgpalliliit (EBF)
- Confederation: BE (Europe)
- President: Ulla Helm

BWF ranking
- Current ranking: 32 ▲7 (2 January 2024)
- Highest ranking: 24 (4 April 2023)

European Mixed Team Championships
- Appearances: 4 (first in 2008)
- Best result: Group stage

European Men's Team Championships
- Appearances: 7 (first in 2006)
- Best result: Group stage

European Women's Team Championships
- Appearances: 7 (first in 2006)
- Best result: Group stage

Helvetia Cup
- Appearances: 4 (first in 2001)
- Best result: Third place (2007)

The Estonia national badminton team (Estonian: Eesti sulgpallikoondis) represents Estonia in international badminton team competitions. It is controlled by the Estonian Badminton Federation, the governing body for badminton in Estonia.

The Estonian team participates in the European Team Badminton Championships but have yet to enter the quarterfinals in all men's, women's and mixed team events. The Estonian team also competed in the now defunct Helvetia Cup.

== Competitive record ==
=== Thomas Cup ===
Year	Round	Pos
1949	Part of the Soviet Union	
1952	Part of the Soviet Union	
1955	Part of the Soviet Union	
1958	Part of the Soviet Union	
1961	Part of the Soviet Union	
1964	Part of the Soviet Union	
1967	Part of the Soviet Union	
1970	Part of the Soviet Union	
1973	Part of the Soviet Union	
1976	Part of the Soviet Union	
1979	Part of the Soviet Union	
1982	Part of the Soviet Union	
1984	Part of the Soviet Union	
1986	Part of the Soviet Union	
1988	Part of the Soviet Union	
1990	Part of the Soviet Union	
1992	Did not enter	
1994	Did not enter	
1996	Did not qualify	
1998
2000
2002	Did not enter	
2004	Did not qualify	

== Participation in European Team Badminton Championships ==
Men's Team

Year	Result
(Greece) 2006	Group stage
(Netherlands) 2008	Group stage
(Poland) 2010	Group stage
(Switzerland) 2014	Group stage
(Russia) 2016	Group stage
(Russia) 2018	Group stage
(France) 2020	Group stage
(Turkey) 2026	Did not qualify

Women's Team

Year	Round	Pos
(Greece) 2006	Group stage	
(Netherlands) 2008	Group stage	
(Poland) 2010	Group stage	
(Switzerland) 2014	Group stage	
(Russia) 2016	Group stage	
(Russia) 2018	Group stage	
(France) 2020	Group stage	
(Turkey) 2026	Group stage	7th

Mixed Team

Year	Result
(Denmark) 2008	Group stage
(England) 2009	Group stage
(Netherlands) 2011	Group stage
(Russia) 2013	Group stage
(Azerbaijan) 2025	Did not qualify

== Participation in Helvetia Cup ==
The Helvetia Cup or European B Team Championships was a European mixed team championship in badminton. The first Helvetia Cup tournament took place in Zürich, Switzerland in 1962. The tournament took place every two years from 1971 until 2007, after which it was dissolved. Estonia won third place in the 2007 edition.

Year	Result
(Czech Republic) 2001	12th place
(Portugal) 2003	15th place
(Cyprus) 2005	7th place
(Iceland) 2007	(bronze) Third place

== Junior competitive record ==
=== World Junior Championships (Suhandinata Cup) ===
Year	Result
(India) 2008	Group W – 21st of 21
(Spain) 2016	Group G1 – 30th of 52
(Russia) 2019	Group C2 – 21st of 43
(New Zealand) 2020	Cancelled
(China) 2021	Cancelled
(Spain) 2022	Group C – 22nd of 37
(United States) 2023	Group E – 16th of 38
(China) 2024	Group C – 16th of 39
(India) 2025	Did not enter
(Egypt) 2026	Quarter-finals – 8th of 47

=== European Junior Team Badminton Championships ===
Mixed Team

Year	Result
(Germany) 2007	15th place
(Italy) 2009	Group stage
(Finland) 2011	Group stage
(Turkey) 2013	Group stage
(Poland) 2015	Group stage
(France) 2017	Group stage
(Estonia) 2018	Group stage
(Finland) 2020	(bronze) Semi-finalist
(Serbia) 2022	Group stage
(Spain) 2024	Group stage
(Hungary) 2026	Quarter-finalist

== Players ==
=== Current squad ===
As of 2 January 2024

==== Men's team ====
Name	DoB/Age	Ranking of event		
Name	DoB/Age	MS	MD	XD
Karl Kert	16 August 2000 (age 26)	326	634	-
Tauri Kilk	7 August 2004 (age 22)	627	634	-
Kristjan Kaljurand	13 July 1992 (age 34)	-	170	286
Raul Käsner	28 June 1988 (age 38)	-	170	402
Anton Berik	29 June 2003 (age 23)	1735	195	953
Mikk Ounmaa	19 August 1997 (age 29)	-	195	176
Andrei Schmidt	27 June 2006 (age 20)	-	989	1359
Hugo Themas	31 August 2005 (age 21)	1803	989	1337

==== Women's team ====
Name	DoB/Age	Ranking of event		
Name	DoB/Age	WS	WD	XD
Kristin Kuuba	15 February 1997 (age 29)	47	-	-
Catlyn Kruus	9 July 2003 (age 23)	263	164	-
Ramona Üprus	24 September 2003 (age 23)	264	164	176
Kati-Kreet Marran	13 July 1998 (age 28)	-	62	402
Helina Rüütel	11 August 1997 (age 29)	-	62	286
Elisaveta Berik	5 June 2005 (age 21)	-	565	1284
Emili Pärsim	3 October 2005 (age 21)	-	565	1359
Andra Mai Hoop	24 April 2003 (age 23)	-	753	953
