= Kaljurand =

Family name

Kaljurand is an Estonian surname meaning "Cliff Beach".

Notable people bearing this name include:

- Ain Kaljurand (born 1965), businessman
- Ants Kaljurand (Ants the Terrible; 1917–1951), partisan (Forest Brother)
- Anu Kaljurand (born 1969), hurdler
- Kaire Kaljurand (born 1974), footballer
- Kalle Kaljurand (born 1960), badminton player
- Kristjan Kaljurand (born 1992), badminton player
- Marina Kaljurand (born 1962), diplomat
- Mihkel Kaljurand (born 1945), chemist
