= Estonian International =

International badminton competition held in Estonia

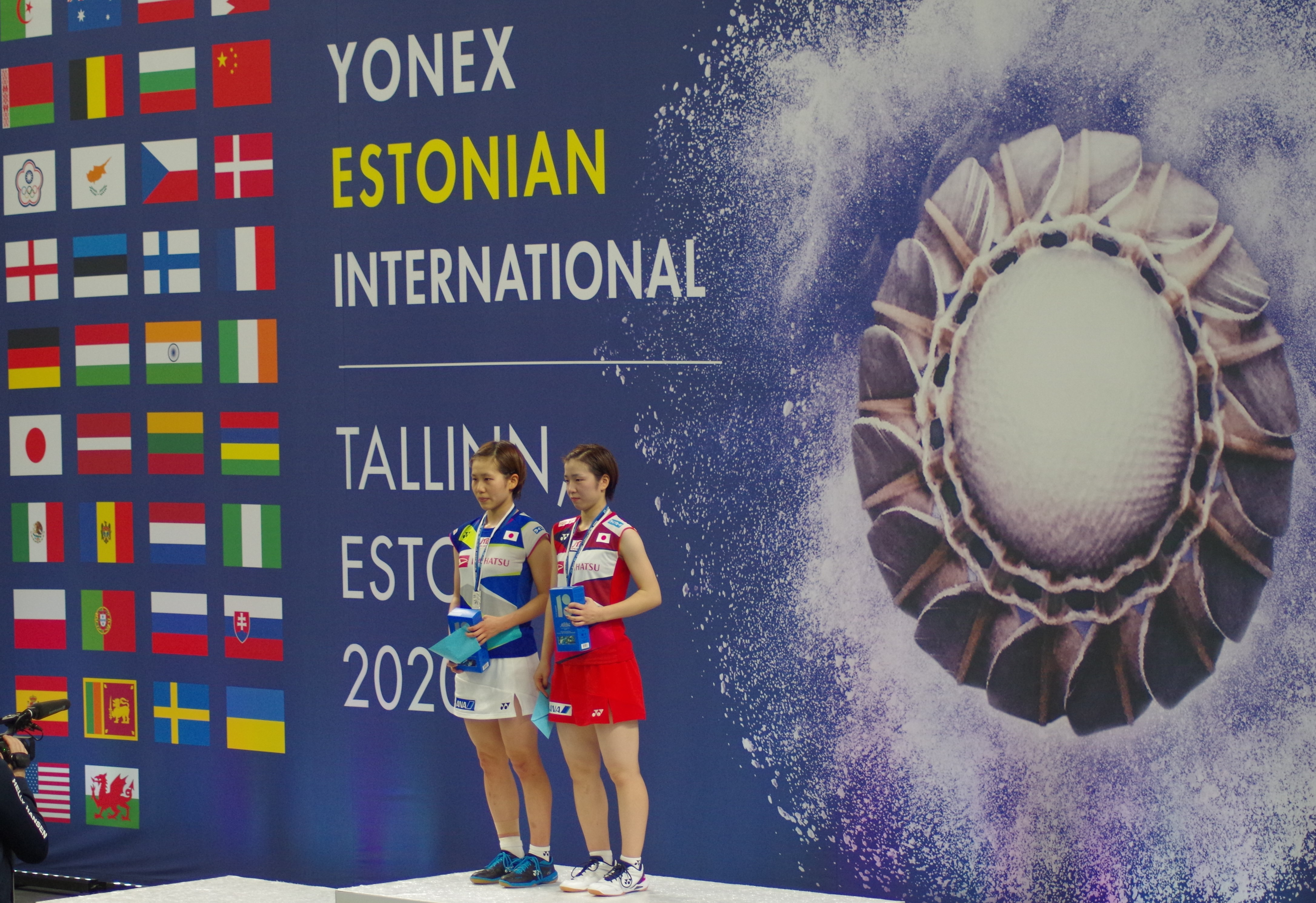
Estonian International Women's singles finalists in 2020

The Estonian International in badminton is an international open held in Estonia since 2001 and is thereby one of the most recent international badminton tournaments in the world.

The tournament is now classified as BWF International Series (formerly Future Series) and admitted to the European Badminton Circuit. As many other international championships in badminton, that usually carry the name of the main sponsor, it is designed as Estonia Kalev International.

== Previous winners ==
Year	Men's singles	Women's singles	Men's doubles	Women's doubles	Mixed doubles	Ref
2001	(Finland) Jyri Aalto	(Russia) Anastasia Russkikh	(Russia) Mikhail Kelj (Russia) Viktor Malioutine	(Russia) Anastasia Russkikh (Estonia) Kai-Riin Saluste	(Russia) Alexandr Russkikh (Russia) Anastasia Russkikh	
2002– 2003	No competition					
2004	(Japan) Yuichi Ikeda	(Estonia) Kati Tolmoff	(Greece) Theodoros Velkos (Greece) George Patis	(Estonia) Kati Tolmoff (England) Solenn Pasturel	(Finland) Ilkka Nyqvist (Finland) Leena Löytömäki	
2005	(France) Jean-Michel Lefort	(Estonia) Kati Tolmoff	(France) Benoit Azzopard (France) Baptiste Carême	(Estonia) Piret Hamer (Estonia) Helen Klaos	(France) Jean-Michel Lefort (Lithuania) Akvilė Stapušaitytė	
2006	(Lithuania) Kęstutis Navickas	(Estonia) Kati Tolmoff	(Russia) Andrey Ashmarin (Russia) Anton Nazarenko	(Germany) Claudia Vogelgsang (Germany) Caren Hückstädt	(Poland) Adam Cwalina (Poland) Malgorzata Kurdelska	
2007	(Denmark) Kristian Nielsen	(Estonia) Kati Tolmoff	(Finland) Tuomas Nuorteva (Finland) Mikko Vikman	(Spain) Lucia Tavera (Spain) Sandra Chirlaque	(Russia) Anton Nazarenko (Russia) Evgenia Antipova	
2008	No competition					
2009	(Finland) Ville Lång	(Russia) Tatjana Bibik	(Japan) Naoki Kawamae (Japan) Shōji Satō	(China) Cai Jiani (China) Rong Schafer	(China) Zhang Yi (China) Cai Jiani	
2010	Cancelled					
2011	(Finland) Ville Lång	(New Zealand) Michelle Chan	(Germany) Peter Käsbauer (Germany) Josche Zurwonne	(Netherlands) Selena Piek (Netherlands) Iris Tabeling	(Netherlands) Jacco Arends (Netherlands) Selena Piek	
2012	(Finland) Ville Lång	(Netherlands) Judith Meulendijks	(France) Laurent Constantin (France) Sébastien Vincent	(Netherlands) Selena Piek (Netherlands) Iris Tabeling	(Netherlands) Dave Khodabux (Netherlands) Selena Piek	
2013	(Japan) Kento Momota	(Denmark) Line Kjærsfeldt	(France) Laurent Constantin (France) Matthieu Lo Ying Ping	(Russia) Irina Khlebko (Russia) Ksenia Polikarpova	(Finland) Anton Kaisti (Finland) Jenny Nyström	
2014	(Denmark) Rasmus Fladberg	(Russia) Evgeniya Kosetskaya	(Russia) Nikita Khakimov (Russia) Vasily Kuznetsov	(Russia) Anastasia Chervaykova (Russia) Nina Vislova	(Russia) Vitalij Durkin (Russia) Nina Vislova	
2015	(Finland) Anton Kaisti	(Russia) Olga Arkhangelskaya	(France) Laurent Constantin (France) Matthieu Lo Ying Ping	(Russia) Victoria Dergunova (Russia) Olga Morozova	(Denmark) Kasper Antonsen (Denmark) Amanda Madsen	
2016	(Finland) Ville Lång	(Belgium) Lianne Tan	(Germany) Jones Ralfy Jansen (Germany) Josche Zurwonne	(Russia) Anastasia Chervyakova (Russia) Olga Morozova	(Russia) Alexandr Zinchenko (Russia) Olga Morozova	
2017	(Estonia) Raul Must	(France) Delphine Lansac	(France) Bastian Kersaudy (France) Julien Maio	(Bulgaria) Mariya Mitsova (Bulgaria) Petya Nedelcheva	(Russia) Rodion Alimov (Russia) Alina Davletova	
2018	(France) Lucas Claerbout	(Israel) Ksenia Polikarpova	(Russia) Andrey Parakhodin (Russia) Nikolai Ukk	(Russia) Ekaterina Bolotova (Russia) Alina Davletova	(Germany) Peter Käsbauer (Germany) Olga Konon	
2019	(France) Arnaud Merklé	(Japan) Asuka Takahashi	(England) Peter Briggs (England) Gregory Mairs	(Denmark) Julie Finne-Ipsen (Denmark) Mai Surrow	(Singapore) Danny Bawa Chrisnanta (Singapore) Tan Wei Han	
2020	(Japan) Hashiru Shimono	(Japan) Natsuki Nidaira	(Chinese Taipei) Chiang Chien-wei (Chinese Taipei) Ye Hong-wei	(Japan) Rena Miyaura (Japan) Saori Ozaki	(Japan) Yujiro Nishikawa (Japan) Saori Ozaki	
2021	Cancelled (Note: This tournament, originally to be played from 14 to 17 January, was later cancelled due to the COVID-19 pandemic in Estonia.)					
2022	(France) Alex Lanier	(Estonia) Kristin Kuuba	(Thailand) Ruttanapak Oupthong (Thailand) Sirawit Sothon	(Thailand) Chasinee Korepap (Thailand) Jhenicha Sudjaipraparat	(Thailand) Ratchapol Makkasasithorn (Thailand) Jhenicha Sudjaipraparat	
2023	(Japan) Yushi Tanaka	(Chinese Taipei) Huang Yu-hsun	(Japan) Shuntaro Mezaki (Japan) Haruya Nishida	(United States) Paula Lynn Cao Hok (United States) Lauren Lam	(Denmark) Mads Vestergaard (Denmark) Christine Busch	
2024	(Finland) Joakim Oldorff	(France) Rosy Oktavia Pancasari	(Singapore) Loh Kean Hean (Singapore) Nicholas Low	(Turkey) Bengisu Erçetin (Turkey) Nazlıcan İnci	(Germany) Jones Ralfy Jansen (Germany) Thuc Phuong Nguyen	
2025	(Finland) Joakim Oldorff	(Finland) Nella Nyqvist	(England) Chua Yue Chern (England) Kelvin Ho	(France) Margot Lambert (France) Camille Pognante	(England) Ethan van Leeuwen (England) Abbygael Harris	
2026	(Japan) Minoru Koga	(India) Rujula Ramu	(Denmark) Christian Faust Kjær (Denmark) Rasmus Kjær	(Malaysia) Low Zi Yu (Malaysia) Noraqilah Maisarah	(Germany) Jonathan Dresp (Germany) Selin Hübsch	

== Performances by nation ==
As of 2026 edition

Pos	Nation	MS	WS	MD	WD	XD	Total
1	Russia		4	4	5.5	5	18.5
2	France	4	2	5	1	0.5	12.5
3	Finland	8	1	1		2	12
4	Japan	5	2	2	1	1	11
5	Estonia	1	5		2		8
6	Denmark	2	1	1	1	2	7
7	Germany			2	1	3	6
8	Netherlands		1		2	2	5
9	England			2	0.5	1	3.5
10	Thailand			1	1	1	3
11	China				1	1	2
11	Singapore			1		1	2
11	Chinese Taipei		1	1			2
14	Lithuania	1				0.5	1.5
15	Belgium		1				1
15	Bulgaria				1		1
15	Greece			1			1
15	India		1				1
15	Israel		1				1
15	Malaysia				1		1
15	New Zealand		1				1
15	Poland					1	1
15	Spain				1		1
15	Turkey				1		1
15	United States				1		1
Total		21	21	21	21	21	105
