= Badminton at the 2019 European Games – Men's singles =

Badminton's men's singles at the 2019 European Games
- Venue: Falcon Club
- Dates: 24–30 June
- Competitors: 32 from 31 nations

Medalists
| gold medal | Anders Antonsen | Denmark |
| silver medal | Brice Leverdez | France |
| bronze medal | Misha Zilberman | Israel |
| bronze medal | Raul Must | Estonia |

The badminton men's singles tournament at the 2019 European Games was held from 24 to 30 June at Falcon Club, Minsk, Belarus.

== Competition format ==
The singles tournament is played with 32 participants, initially playing in eight groups of four, before the top two from each group qualifies for a 16-player knock-out stage.

=== Schedule ===
All times are in FET (UTC+03).

| Start time | Session |
|---|---|
| 24 June, 9:00 | Group stage, matchday 1 |
| 25 June, 9:00 | Group stage, matchday 2 |
| 26 June, 9:00 | Group stage, matchday 3 |
| 27 June, 10:00 | Round of 16 |
| 28 June, 10:00 | Quarter-finals |
| 29 June, 10:00 | Semi-finals |
| 30 June, 12:00 | Final |

== Seeds ==
Seeds for all badminton events at the 2nd European Games were announced on 29 May.

1. Viktor Axelsen (DEN) (withdrew)
2. Anders Antonsen (DEN) (gold medal)
3. Mark Caljouw (NED) (quarterfinals)
4. Brice Leverdez (FRA) (silver medal)
5. Misha Zilberman (ISR) (bronze medal)
6. Pablo Abián (ESP) (round of 16)
7. Vladimir Malkov (RUS) (quarterfinals)
8. Toby Penty (GBR) (quarterfinals)

== Results ==
The group stage draws was held on 4 June.

=== Group stage ===
==== Group A ====
| Pos | Team | Pld | W | L | GF | GA | GD | PF | PA | PD | Qualification |
|---|---|---|---|---|---|---|---|---|---|---|---|
| 1 | Emre Lale (TUR) | 1 | 1 | 0 | 2 | 1 | +1 | 59 | 52 | +7 | Qualification to knock-out stage |
| 2 | Gergely Krausz (HUN) | 1 | 0 | 1 | 1 | 2 | −1 | 52 | 59 | −7 | Qualification to knock-out stage |

Source: TS

| Date | | Score | | Set 1 | Set 2 | Set 3 |
|---|---|---|---|---|---|---|
| 24 June; 13:00 | Alexander Roovers (Germany) | ~~0–2~~ | (Hungary) Gergely Krausz | ~~19–21~~ | ~~13–21~~ | |
| 25 June; 11:00 | Emre Lale (Turkey) | 2–1 | (Hungary) Gergely Krausz | 17–21 | 21–18 | 21–13 |
| 26 June; 12:00 | Emre Lale (Turkey) | Retired | (Germany) Alexander Roovers | 19–21 | 22–20 | 0–0^{r} |

==== Group B ====
| Pos | Team | Pld | W | L | GF | GA | GD | PF | PA | PD | Qualification |
|---|---|---|---|---|---|---|---|---|---|---|---|
| 1 | Anders Antonsen (DEN) [2] | 3 | 3 | 0 | 6 | 0 | +6 | 126 | 72 | +54 | Qualification to knock-out stage |
| 2 | Raul Must (EST) | 3 | 2 | 1 | 4 | 2 | +2 | 106 | 111 | −5 | Qualification to knock-out stage |
| 3 | Zvonimir Đurkinjak (CRO) | 3 | 1 | 2 | 2 | 5 | −3 | 134 | 149 | −15 | |
| 4 | Maxime Moreels (BEL) | 3 | 0 | 3 | 1 | 6 | −5 | 116 | 150 | −34 | |

Source: TS

| Date | | Score | | Set 1 | Set 2 | Set 3 |
|---|---|---|---|---|---|---|
| 24 June; 19:50 | Anders Antonsen (Denmark) | 2–0 | (Croatia) Zvonimir Đurkinjak | 21–17 | 21–11 | |
| 24 June; 20:30 | Maxime Moreels (Belgium) | 0–2 | (Estonia) Raul Must | 17–21 | 12–21 | |
| 25 June; 18:45 | Zvonimir Đurkinjak (Croatia) | 0–2 | (Estonia) Raul Must | 19–21 | 21–23 | |
| 25 June; 19:20 | Anders Antonsen (Denmark) | 2–0 | (Belgium) Maxime Moreels | 21–15 | 21–9 | |
| 26 June; 15:00 | Anders Antonsen (Denmark) | 2–0 | (Estonia) Raul Must | 21–10 | 21–10 | |
| 26 June; 15:40 | Zvonimir Đurkinjak (Croatia) | 2–1 | (Belgium) Maxime Moreels | 26–24 | 19–21 | 21–18 |

==== Group C ====
| Pos | Team | Pld | W | L | GF | GA | GD | PF | PA | PD | Qualification |
|---|---|---|---|---|---|---|---|---|---|---|---|
| 1 | Mark Caljouw (NED) [3] | 3 | 3 | 0 | 6 | 0 | +6 | 126 | 89 | +37 | Qualification to knock-out stage |
| 2 | Michał Rogalski (POL) | 3 | 2 | 1 | 4 | 2 | +2 | 116 | 105 | +11 | Qualification to knock-out stage |
| 3 | Bernardo Atilano (POR) | 3 | 1 | 2 | 2 | 4 | −2 | 107 | 113 | −6 | |
| 4 | Cristian Savin (MDA) | 3 | 0 | 3 | 0 | 6 | −6 | 85 | 127 | −42 | |

Source: TS

| Date | | Score | | Set 1 | Set 2 | Set 3 |
|---|---|---|---|---|---|---|
| 24 June; 14:45 | Mark Caljouw (Netherlands) | 2–0 | (Portugal) Bernardo Atilano | 21–8 | 21–19 | |
| 24 June; 18:00 | Cristian Savin (Moldova) | 0–2 | (Poland) Michał Rogalski | 16–21 | 10–21 | |
| 25 June; 20:30 | Bernardo Atilano (Portugal) | 0–2 | (Poland) Michał Rogalski | 18–21 | 19–21 | |
| 25 June; 21:45 | Mark Caljouw (Netherlands) | 2–0 | (Moldova) Cristian Savin | 21–14 | 21–16 | |
| 26 June; 15:40 | Bernardo Atilano (Portugal) | 2–0 | (Moldova) Cristian Savin | 22–20 | 21–9 | |
| 26 June; 16:20 | Mark Caljouw (Netherlands) | 2–0 | (Poland) Michał Rogalski | 21–18 | 21–14 | |

==== Group D ====
| Pos | Team | Pld | W | L | GF | GA | GD | PF | PA | PD | Qualification |
|---|---|---|---|---|---|---|---|---|---|---|---|
| 1 | Brice Leverdez (FRA) [4] | 2 | 2 | 0 | 4 | 0 | +4 | 86 | 59 | +27 | Qualification to knock-out stage |
| 2 | Christian Kirchmayr (SUI) | 2 | 1 | 1 | 2 | 2 | 0 | 86 | 76 | +10 | Qualification to knock-out stage |
| 3 | Luka Milić (SRB) | 2 | 0 | 2 | 0 | 4 | −4 | 51 | 88 | −37 | |

Source: TS

| Date | | Score | | Set 1 | Set 2 | Set 3 |
|---|---|---|---|---|---|---|
| 24 June; 21:10 | (France) Brice Leverdez | 2–0 | (Serbia) Luka Milić | 21–11 | 21–8 | |
| 24 June; 21:50 | Kári Gunnarsson (Iceland) | ~~1–2~~ | (Switzerland) Christian Kirchmayr | ~~21–13~~ | ~~17–21~~ | ~~18–21~~ |
| 25 June; 21:50 | Brice Leverdez (France) | ~~2–0~~ | (Iceland) Kari Gunnarsson | ~~21–10~~ | ~~21–16~~ | |
| 25 June; 21:50 | Luka Miliċ (Serbia) | 0–2 | (Switzerland) Christian Kirchmayr | 9–21 | 23–25 | |
| 26 June; 17:40 | Brice Leverdez (France) | 2–0 | (Switzerland) Christian Kirchmayr | 22–20 | 22–20 | |
| 26 June; 19:00 | Luka Milić (Serbia) | Retired | (Iceland) Kári Gunnarsson | 22–20 | 23–25 | 11–6^{r} |

==== Group E ====
| Pos | Team | Pld | W | L | GF | GA | GD | PF | PA | PD | Qualification |
|---|---|---|---|---|---|---|---|---|---|---|---|
| 1 | Misha Zilberman (ISR) [5] | 3 | 3 | 0 | 6 | 0 | +6 | 129 | 108 | +21 | Qualification to knock-out stage |
| 2 | Eetu Heino (FIN) | 3 | 2 | 1 | 4 | 2 | +2 | 117 | 93 | +24 | Qualification to knock-out stage |
| 3 | Miha Ivanič (SLO) | 3 | 1 | 2 | 2 | 5 | −3 | 130 | 137 | −7 | |
| 4 | Rosario Maddaloni (ITA) | 3 | 0 | 3 | 1 | 6 | −5 | 106 | 144 | −38 | |

Source: TS

| Date | | Score | | Set 1 | Set 2 | Set 3 |
|---|---|---|---|---|---|---|
| 24 June; 11:00 | Misha Zilberman (Israel) | 2–0 | (Slovenia) Miha Ivanič | 24–22 | 21–18 | |
| 24 June; 11:40 | Rosario Maddaloni (Italy) | 0–2 | (Finland) Eetu Heino | 8–21 | 13–21 | |
| 25 June; 12:20 | Miha Ivanič (Slovenia) | 0–2 | (Finland) Eetu Heino | 15–21 | 15–21 | |
| 25 June; 16:00 | Misha Zilberman (Israel) | 2–0 | (Italy) Rosario Maddaloni | 21–19 | 21–16 | |
| 26 June; 09:00 | Misha Zilberman (Israel) | 2–0 | (Finland) Eetu Heino | 21–16 | 21–17 | |
| 26 June; 09:40 | Miha Ivanič (Slovenia) | 2–1 | (Italy) Rosario Maddaloni | 21–19 | 18–21 | 21–10 |

==== Group F ====
| Pos | Team | Pld | W | L | GF | GA | GD | PF | PA | PD | Qualification |
|---|---|---|---|---|---|---|---|---|---|---|---|
| 1 | Pablo Abián (ESP) [6] | 3 | 3 | 0 | 6 | 2 | +4 | 159 | 127 | +32 | Qualification to knock-out stage |
| 2 | Nhat Nguyen (IRL) | 3 | 2 | 1 | 5 | 3 | +2 | 157 | 132 | +25 | Qualification to knock-out stage |
| 3 | Luka Wraber (AUT) | 3 | 1 | 2 | 3 | 5 | −2 | 131 | 163 | −32 | |
| 4 | Daniel Nikolov (BUL) | 3 | 0 | 3 | 2 | 6 | −4 | 138 | 163 | −25 | |

Source: TS

| Date | | Score | | Set 1 | Set 2 | Set 3 |
|---|---|---|---|---|---|---|
| 24 June; 13:00 | Nhat Nguyen (Republic of Ireland) | 2–0 | (Bulgaria) Daniel Nikolov | 21–11 | 21–13 | |
| 24 June; 14:20 | Pablo Abián (Spain) | 2–0 | (Austria) Luka Wraber | 21–11 | 21–8 | |
| 25 June; 12:30 | Pablo Abián (Spain) | 2–1 | (Republic of Ireland) Nhat Nguyen | 18–21 | 22–20 | 21–13 |
| 25 June; 13:15 | Luka Wraber (Austria) | 2–1 | (Bulgaria) Daniel Nikolov | 21–17 | 23–25 | 21–18 |
| 26 June; 09:00 | Pablo Abián (Spain) | 2–1 | (Bulgaria) Daniel Nikolov | 23–21 | 12–21 | 21–12 |
| 26 June; 09:45 | Luka Wraber (Austria) | 1–2 | (Republic of Ireland) Nhat Nguyen | 21–19 | 12–21 | 14–21 |

==== Group G ====
| Pos | Team | Pld | W | L | GF | GA | GD | PF | PA | PD | Qualification |
|---|---|---|---|---|---|---|---|---|---|---|---|
| 1 | Vladimir Malkov (RUS) [7] | 3 | 3 | 0 | 6 | 0 | +6 | 126 | 70 | +56 | Qualification to knock-out stage |
| 2 | Azmy Qowimuramadhoni (AZE) | 3 | 2 | 1 | 4 | 3 | +1 | 120 | 125 | −5 | Qualification to knock-out stage |
| 3 | Collins Valentine Filimon (ROU) | 3 | 1 | 2 | 3 | 5 | −2 | 126 | 151 | −25 | |
| 4 | Robert Mann (LUX) | 3 | 0 | 3 | 1 | 6 | −5 | 113 | 139 | −26 | |

Source: TS

| Date | | Score | | Set 1 | Set 2 | Set 3 |
|---|---|---|---|---|---|---|
| 24 June; 16:00 | Collins Valentine Filimon (Romania) | 1–2 | (Azerbaijan) Azmy Qowimuramadhoni | 19–21 | 21–18 | 10–21 |
| 24 June; 17:20 | Vladimit Malkov (Russia) | 2–0 | (Luxembourg) Robert Mann | 21–17 | 21–14 | |
| 25 June; 17:20 | Vladimir Malkov (Russia) | 2–0 | (Romania) Collins Valentine Filmon | 21–8 | 21–13 | |
| 25 June; 19:10 | Robert Mann (Luxembourg) | 0–2 | (Azerbaijan) Azmy Qowimuramadhoni | 15–21 | 18–21 | |
| 26 June; 12:20 | Robert Mann (Luxembourg) | 1–2 | (Romania) Collins Valentine Filimon | 21–13 | 13–21 | 16–21 |
| 26 June; 13:00 | Vladimir Malkov (Russia) | 2–0 | (Azerbaijan) Azmy Qowimuramadhoni | 21–7 | 21–11 | |

==== Group H ====
| Pos | Team | Pld | W | L | GF | GA | GD | PF | PA | PD | Qualification |
|---|---|---|---|---|---|---|---|---|---|---|---|
| 1 | Toby Penty (GBR) [8] | 3 | 3 | 0 | 6 | 0 | +6 | 128 | 94 | +34 | Qualification to knock-out stage |
| 2 | Felix Burestedt (SWE) | 3 | 2 | 1 | 4 | 3 | +1 | 123 | 124 | −1 | Qualification to knock-out stage |
| 3 | Artem Pochtarov (UKR) | 3 | 1 | 2 | 2 | 5 | −3 | 126 | 134 | −8 | |
| 4 | Milan Ludík (CZE) | 3 | 0 | 3 | 2 | 6 | −4 | 132 | 157 | −25 | |

Source: TS

| Date | | Score | | Set 1 | Set 2 | Set 3 |
|---|---|---|---|---|---|---|
| 24 June; 18:30 | Artem Pochtarov (Ukraine) | 0–2 | (Sweden) Felix Burestedt | 16–21 | 17–21 | |
| 24 June; 20:30 | Toby Penty (United Kingdom) | 2–0 | (Czech Republic) Milan Ludík | 21–19 | 21–16 | |
| 25 June; 20:15 | Milan Ludík (Czech Republic) | 1–2 | (Sweden) Felix Burestedt | 16–21 | 21–11 | 12–21 |
| 25 June; 20:30 | Toby Penty (United Kingdom) | 2–0 | (Ukraine) Artem Pochtarov | 23–21 | 21–10 | |
| 26 June; 17:40 | Milan Ludík (Czech Republic) | 1–2 | (Ukraine) Artem Pochtarov | 15–21 | 22–20 | 11–21 |
| 26 June; 18:45 | Toby Penty (United Kingdom) | 2–0 | (Sweden) Felix Burestedt | 21–19 | 21–9 | |

=== Knock-out stage ===
Round of 16
Emre Lale (TUR) | 14 | 16
Raul Must (EST) | 21 | 21
6 | Pablo Abián (ESP) | 14 | 21 | 21
Felix Burestedt (SWE) | 21 | 11 | 23
4 | Brice Leverdez (FRA) | 21 | 16 | 21
Michał Rogalski (POL) | 16 | 21 | 16
7 | Vladimir Malkov (RUS) | 21 | 21
Eetu Heino (FIN) | 14 | 14
Gergely Krausz (HUN) | 21 | 16
5 | Misha Zilberman (ISR) | 23 | 21
Azmy Qowimuramadhoni (AZE) | 12 | 21 | 14
3 | Mark Caljouw (NED) | 21 | 17 | 21
Nhat Nguyen (IRL) | 12 | 11
8 | Toby Penty (GBR) | 21 | 21
Christian Kirchmayr (SUI) | 15 | 8
2 | Anders Antonsen (DEN) | 21 | 21

Quarterfinals
Raul Must (EST) | 16 | 21 | 21
Felix Burestedt (SWE) | 21 | 12 | 12
4 | Brice Leverdez (FRA) | 21 | 21
7 | Vladimir Malkov (RUS) | 13 | 10
5 | Misha Zilberman (ISR) | 12 | 21 | 21
3 | Mark Caljouw (NED) | 21 | 17 | 15
8 | Toby Penty (GBR) | 15 | 16
2 | Anders Antonsen (DEN) | 21 | 21

Semifinals
Raul Must (EST) | 20 | 8
4 | Brice Leverdez (FRA) | 22 | 21
5 | Misha Zilberman (ISR) | 9 | 11
2 | Anders Antonsen (DEN) | 21 | 21

Final
4 | Brice Leverdez (FRA) | 19 | 21 | 10
2 | Anders Antonsen (DEN) | 21 | 14 | 21
