= Latvia International =

Badminton tournament held in Latvia

The Latvia International (or the Latvia Riga International) is an international badminton tournament that has been held in Latvia since 2005.

== Previous winners ==
Year	Men's singles	Women's singles	Men's doubles	Women's doubles	Mixed doubles	Notes	Ref
2005	(France) Simon Maunoury	(Poland) Kamila Augustyn	(Poland) Łukasz Moreń (Poland) Wojciech Szkudlarczyk	(Estonia) Kai-Riin Saluste (Estonia) Kati Tolmoff	(Lithuania) Kęstutis Navickas (Poland) Kamila Augustyn	BWF International Series	
2006	(Spain) Pablo Abián	(Ukraine) Elena Nozdran	(Scotland) David T. Forbes (Scotland) Stewart Kerr	(Estonia) Helen Reino (Estonia) Piret Hamer	(Russia) Anton Nazarenko (Russia) Elena Chernyavskaya	BWF International Series	
2012	(Lithuania) Alan Plavin	(Latvia) Ieva Pope	(Lithuania) Alan Plavin (Lithuania) Povilas Bartušis	(Russia) Oksana Kuksenko (Russia) Svetlana Neumoina	(Lithuania) Edgaras Slušnys (Lithuania) Gerda Voitechovskaja		
2012	(Lithuania) Alan Plavin	(Latvia) Ieva Pope	(Lithuania) Alan Plavin (Lithuania) Povilas Bartušis	(Russia) Oksana Kuksenko (Russia) Svetlana Neumoina	(Estonia) Kristjan Kaljurand (Estonia) Laura Tomband		
2013	(Lithuania) Kęstutis Navickas	(Estonia) Helina Rüütel	(Estonia) Rainer Kaljumäe (Estonia) Raul Käsner	(Estonia) Kristin Kuuba (Estonia) Helina Rüütel	(Lithuania) Povilas Bartušis (Lithuania) Vytaute Fomkinaite		
2014 I	(Lithuania) Povilas Bartušis	(Latvia) Kristīne Šefere	(Lithuania) Alan Plavin (Lithuania) Povilas Bartušis	(Estonia) Kati-Kreet Marran (Estonia) Helina Rüütel	(Estonia) Kristjan Kaljurand (Estonia) Laura Tomband		
2014 II	(Estonia) Raul Must	(Sweden) Matilda Petersen	(Finland) Kasper Lehikoinen (Finland) Marko Pyykönen	(Denmark) Emilie Juul Møller (Denmark) Cecilie Sentow	(Estonia) Kristjan Kaljurand (Estonia) Laura Tomband	BWF Future Series	
2015	(Russia) Sergey Sirant	(Russia) Anastasia Chervyakova	(Denmark) Mads Emil Christensen (Denmark) Kristoffer Knudsen	(Estonia) Kristin Kuuba (Estonia) Helina Rüütel	(Russia) Andrey Parakhodin (Russia) Anastasia Chervyakova	BWF Future Series	
2016	(France) Toma Junior Popov	(Russia) Elena Komendrovskaja	(Russia) Andrei Ivanov (Russia) Anton Nazarenko	(Russia) Ksenia Evgenova (Russia) Maria Shegurova	(France) Thom Gicquel (France) Léonice Huet	BWF Future Series	
2017	(Germany) Kai Schäfer	(China) Qi Xuefei	(Estonia) Kristjan Kaljurand (Estonia) Raul Käsner	(Russia) Olga Arkhangelskaya (Russia) Natalia Rogova	(France) Fabien Delrue (France) Juliette Moinard	BWF Future Series	
2018	(France) Toma Junior Popov	(Estonia) Kristin Kuuba	(France) Fabien Delrue (France) William Villeger	(Estonia) Kristin Kuuba (Estonia) Helina Rüütel	(Poland) Paweł Śmiłowski (Poland) Magdalena Świerczyńska	BWF Future Series	
2019	(Netherlands) Aram Mahmoud	(Wales) Jordan Hart	(Denmark) Emil Lauritzen (Denmark) Mads Muurholm	(Estonia) Kati-Kreet Marran (Estonia) Helina Rüütel	(Poland) Paweł Śmiłowski (Poland) Wiktoria Adamek	BWF Future Series	
2020	(Estonia) Mihkel Laanes	(Estonia) Catlyn Kruus	(Estonia) Mikk Järveoja (Estonia) Mihkel Laanes	(Estonia) Kati-Kreet Marran (Estonia) Helina Rüütel	(Estonia) Mihkel Laanes (Estonia) Helina Rüütel	BWF Future Series	
2021	(India) Meiraba Luwang	(Ukraine) Polina Buhrova	(Malaysia) Muhammad Nurfirdaus Azman (Malaysia) Yap Roy King	(Malaysia) Low Yeen Yuan (Malaysia) Valeree Siow	(Malaysia) Yap Roy King (Malaysia) Valeree Siow	BWF Future Series	
2022	(Italy) Christopher Vittoriani	(Chinese Taipei) Wang Pei-yu	(Chinese Taipei) Lai Po-yu (Chinese Taipei) Tsai Fu-cheng	(Estonia) Kati-Kreet Marran (Estonia) Helina Rüütel	(Denmark) Emil Lauritzen (Denmark) Signe Schulz	BWF Future Series	
2023	(Croatia) Aria Dinata	(Denmark) Irina Amalie Andersen	(Germany) Marvin Datko (Germany) Jarne Schlevoigt	(Estonia) Kati-Kreet Marran (Estonia) Helina Rüütel	(France) Tom Lalot Trescarte (France) Elsa Jacob	BWF Future Series	
2024	(Croatia) Aria Dinata	(Finland) Nella Nyqvist	(Germany) Jonathan Dresp (Germany) Aaron Sonnenschein	(Poland) Anastasia Khomich (Poland) Daria Zimnol	(Estonia) Kristjan Kaljurand (Estonia) Helina Rüütel	BWF Future Series	
2025	(Malaysia) Lee Shun Yang	(Chinese Taipei) Wang Yu-si	(Spain) Jacob Fernandez (Spain) Alberto Perals	(Estonia) Catlyn Kruus (Estonia) Ramona Üprus	(Estonia) Mikk Õunmaa (Estonia) Ramona Üprus	BWF Future Series	
2026	(Chinese Taipei) Chen Yu-cheng	(Hong Kong) Ip Sum Yau	(Italy) Matteo Massetti (Italy) David Salutt	(Ukraine) Maria Koriagina (Ukraine) Yaroslava Vantsarovska	(Denmark) Alexander Pedersen (Austria) Serena Au Yeong	BWF Future Series	

== Performances by nation ==
As of the 2026 edition

Pos	Nation	MS	WS	MD	WD	XD	Total
1	Estonia	2	3	3	11	6	25
2	Russia	1	2	1	3	2	9
3	Lithuania	3		2		2.5	7.5
4	France	3		1		3	7
5	Denmark		1	2	1	1.5	5.5
5	Poland		1	1	1	2.5	5.5
7	Chinese Taipei	1	2	1			4
7	Malaysia	1		1	1	1	4
9	Germany	1		2			3
9	Ukraine		2		1		3
11	Croatia	2					2
11	Finland		1	1			2
11	Italy	1		1			2
11	Latvia		2				2
11	Spain	1		1			2
16	China		1				1
16	Hong Kong		1				1
16	India	1					1
16	Netherlands	1					1
16	Scotland			1			1
16	Sweden		1				1
16	Wales		1				1
23	Austria					0.5	0.5
Total		18	18	18	18	19	91
