= Ojamaa (surname) =

Family name

Origin
- Language: Estonian
- Meaning: "stream/brook land"
- Region of origin: Estonia

Ojamaa is an Estonian language surname meaning "stream/brook land". As of January 2019, there were 289 people with the surname within the country: 137 men and 147 women. Ojamaa is ranked as the 541th most common surname in Estonia. People bearing the surname Ojamaa include:

- Andres Ojamaa (1969–1993), Estonian badminton player
- Henrik Ojamaa (born 1991), Estonian footballer
- Hindrek Ojamaa (born 1995), Estonian footballer
- Liisi Ojamaa (1972–2019), Estonian poet, translator, literary critic and editor
