= Kivisaar =

Family name

Kivisaar is an Estonian-language surname. Notable people with the surname include:

- Alari Kivisaar (born 1967), Estonian television personality and nature photographer.
- Alfred Kivisaar (1953–2021), Estonian badminton player.

== See also ==
- Kivisaari
