= Getter Saar (badminton) =

Estonian badminton player (born 1992)

Personal information
- Born: 6 June 1992 (age 34) Kuressaare, Estonia
- Height: 1.71 m (5 ft 7 in)

Sport
- Country: Estonia
- Sport: Badminton
- Handedness: Right

Women's singles
- Highest ranking: 109 (30 October 2017)
- Current ranking: 191 (1 October 2019)
- BWF profile
Medal record
Women's badminton
Representing Saaremaa
Island Games
Gold medal – first place	2019 Gibraltar	Women's singles

Getter Saar (born 6 June 1992) is an Estonian badminton player, currently residing in Finland. She started playing badminton at the age of ten, and made a debut in the international tournament in 2007. As a single player she was the third on the pedestal at the Estonian Championships in 2010, 2011, 2013 and 2015. Besides that, in 2010 and 2011 she was the Estonian junior champion in the women's singles, and in 2011 in the mixed doubles. Saar was a semi finalist in 2015 Riga International and the runner-up in 2019 Bulgarian International.

== Achievements ==
=== BWF International Challenge/Series ===
Women's singles

Year	Tournament	Opponent	Score	Result
2019	Bulgarian International	(Sweden) Rebecca Kuhl	16–21, 16–21	(silver) Runner-up

BWF International Challenge tournament
BWF International Series tournament
BWF Future Series tournament
