= Anastasia Dobrinina =

Russian badminton player (born 1993)

Personal information
- Born: Anastasia Dobrinina; Анастасия Добрынина; 3 September 1993 (age 33)

Sport
- Country: Russia
- Sport: Badminton

Women's singles & doubles
- Highest ranking: 523 (WS, 24 July 2014); 377 (WD, 18 September 2014); 553 (XD, 6 June 2013)
- BWF profile

Anastasia Igorevna Dobrinina (Russian: Анастасия Игоревна Добрынина; born 3 September 1993) is a Russian badminton player.

== Achievements ==
=== BWF International Challenge/Series ===
Women's doubles
Year	Tournament	Partner	Opponent	Score	Result
2014	Lithuanian International	(Russia) Viktoriia Vorobeva	(Estonia) Kristin Kuuba (Estonia) Helina Rüütel	21–19, 21–19	(gold) Winner

BWF International Challenge tournament
BWF International Series tournament
BWF Future Series tournament
