= Reet Valgmaa =

Estonian badminton player

Reet Valgmaa (1973–1977 Kull; born 30 March 1952) is an Estonian badminton player.

She was born in Tartu. In 1974 she graduated from Tartu State University's Institute of Physical Education.

She began her badminton career under the guidance of her father. She won 9 medals at Soviet Union badminton championships. She has also won 30 gold medals at Estonian badminton championships.

2005–2008 she was a member of the board of Estonian Badminton Federation.
