= Olga Arkhangelskaya =

Russian badminton player (born 1981)

Personal information
- Born: Ольга Александровна Голованова (Olga Aleksandrovna Golovanova); 20 March 1981 (age 45) Moscow, USSR

Sport
- Country: Russia
- Sport: Badminton

Women's singles & doubles
- Highest ranking: 46 (WS 19 June 2014); 40 (WD 14 October 2010); 418 (XD 19 July 2018)
- BWF profile
Medal record
Women's badminton
Representing Russia
European Women's Team Championships
Silver medal – second place	2010 Warsaw	Women's team
Silver medal – second place	2014 Basel	Women's team

Olga Aleksandrovna Arkhangelskaya (Russian: Ольга Александровна Архангельская; née Golovanova; born 20 March 1981) is a Russian badminton player.

== Achievements ==
=== BWF Grand Prix ===
The BWF Grand Prix had two levels, the Grand Prix and Grand Prix Gold. It was a series of badminton tournaments sanctioned by the Badminton World Federation (BWF) and played between 2007 and 2017.

Women's doubles
Year	Tournament	Partner	Opponent	Score	Result
2009	Russian Open	(Russia) Tatjana Bibik	(Russia) Valeria Sorokina (Russia) Nina Vislova	8–21, 20–22	(silver) Runner-up

BWF Grand Prix Gold tournament
BWF Grand Prix tournament

=== BWF International Challenge/Series (11 titles, 16 runners-up) ===
Women's singles
Year	Tournament	Opponent	Score	Result
2008	Romanian International	(South Korea) Hwang Hye-youn	13–21, 7–21	(silver) Runner-up
2010	Cyprus International	(Spain) Carolina Marín	12–21, 27–25, 14–21	(silver) Runner-up
2012	Kharkiv International	(Russia) Evgeniya Kosetskaya	15–21, 18–21	(silver) Runner-up
2012	Hungarian International	(Ukraine) Marija Ulitina	11–21, 21–17, 16–21	(silver) Runner-up
2013	Hatzor International	(Portugal) Telma Santos	16–21, 19–21	(silver) Runner-up
2013	Hungarian International	(Netherlands) Soraya de Visch Eijbergen	21–15, 18–21, 21–15	(gold) Winner
2013	Norwegian International	(Denmark) Mia Blichfeldt	21–19, 16–21, 16–21	(silver) Runner-up
2014	Finnish International	(Russia) Victoria Slobodjanuk	21–12, 21–12	(gold) Winner
2015	Estonian International	(Estonia) Kati Tolmoff	23–21, 13–21, 21–18	(gold) Winner
2015	Croatian International	(Russia) Elena Komendrovskaja	9–21, 18–21	(silver) Runner-up
2017	Latvia International	(China) Qi Xuefei	19–21, 6–21	(silver) Runner-up

Women's doubles
Year	Tournament	Partner	Opponent	Score	Result
2008	Austrian International	(Russia) Anastasia Prokopenko	(China) Cai Jiani (China) Yu Qi	16–21, 8–21	(silver) Runner-up
2008	Romanian International	(Russia) Anastasia Prokopenko	(United States) Eva Lee (United States) Mesinee Mangkalakiri	21–18, 21–15	(gold) Winner
2008	Hungarian International	(Russia) Anastasia Prokopenko	(Bulgaria) Petya Nedelcheva (Bulgaria) Dimitriya Popstoykova	21–12, 10–21, 21–12	(gold) Winner
2008	Croatian International	(Russia) Tatjana Bibik	(Denmark) Maria Thorberg (Estonia) Kati Tolmoff	22–24, 15–21	(silver) Runner-up
2009	Kharkiv International	(Russia) Tatjana Bibik	(Ukraine) Anna Kobceva (Ukraine) Elena Prus	21–8, 18–21, 18–21	(silver) Runner-up
2009	Hungarian International	(Russia) Tatjana Bibik	(Russia) Irina Khlebko (Russia) Ksenia Polikarpova	21–16, 17–21, 21–13	(gold) Winner
2010	Bulgarian International	(Russia) Tatjana Bibik	(Bulgaria) Petya Nedelcheva (Russia) Anastasia Russkikh	Walkover	(silver) Runner-up
2011	White Nights	(Russia) Tatjana Bibik	(Russia) Irina Khlebko (Russia) Anastasia Russkikh	17–21, 19–21	(silver) Runner-up
2013	Hatzor International	(Russia) Viktoriia Vorobeva	(Croatia) Maja Pavlinić (Croatia) Dorotea Sutara	21–19, 21–7	(gold) Winner
2013	Hungarian International	(Russia) Viktoriia Vorobeva	(Denmark) Celine Juel (Denmark) Josephine van Zaane	21–17, 19–21, 21–11	(gold) Winner
2013	Norwegian International	(Russia) Viktoriia Vorobeva	(Denmark) Julie Finne-Ipsen (Denmark) Rikke Søby Hansen	14–21, 22–24	(silver) Runner-up
2014	Austrian International	(Russia) Viktoriia Vorobeva	(Bulgaria) Gabriela Stoeva (Bulgaria) Stefani Stoeva	17–21, 22–20, 15–21	(silver) Runner-up
2014	White Nights	(Russia) Viktoriia Vorobeva	(Russia) Ekaterina Bolotova (Russia) Evgeniya Kosetskaya	14–21, 24–26	(silver) Runner-up
2017	Slovenia International	(Russia) Natalia Rogova	(England) Jenny Moore (England) Victoria Williams	22–20, 21–17	(gold) Winner
2017	Latvia International	(Russia) Natalia Rogova	(Estonia) Kristin Kuuba (Estonia) Helina Ruutel	18–21, 21–13, 21–19	(gold) Winner
2018	Belarus International	(Russia) Elizaveta Tarasova	(Ukraine) Yuliya Kazarinova (Ukraine) Yevgeniya Paksyutova	21–11, 21–13	(gold) Winner

BWF International Challenge tournament
BWF International Series tournament
BWF Future Series tournament
