= Anneli Lambing =

Estonian badminton player

Anneli Lambing (since 1991 Parts; born 12 November 1968) is an Estonian badminton player.

She was born in Tartu.

She began her badminton career in 1979, coached by Mart Siliksaar. She is a multiple-time Estonian champion. From 1987 to 1990 she was a member of the Estonian national badminton team.
