= Viktoriia Vorobeva =

Russian badminton player (born 1994)

Personal information
- Born: Виктория Андреевна Воробьёва (Viktoriia Andreevna Vorobeva); 23 April 1994 (age 32)

Sport
- Country: Russia
- Sport: Badminton

Women's singles and doubles
- Highest ranking: 129 (WS 9 October 2014); 43 (WD 30 October 2014); 71 (XD 22 November 2018)
- BWF profile

Viktoriia Andreevna Vorobeva (Russian: Виктория Андреевна Воробьёва; born 23 April 1994) is a Russian badminton player. In the national event, she plays for Kazan, Republic of Tatarstan. She attended the Volga State Academy of Physical Culture, Sports and Tourism.

== BWF International Challenge/Series (6 titles, 8 runners-up) ==
Women's doubles
Year	Tournament	Partner	Opponent	Score	Result
2012	White Nights	(Russia) Evgeniya Kosetskaya	(Russia) Tatjana Bibik (Russia) Anastasia Chervyakova	Walkover	(silver) Runner-up
2013	Hatzor International	(Russia) Olga Golovanova	(Croatia) Maja Pavlinić (Croatia) Dorotea Sutara	21–19, 21–7	(gold) Winner
2013	Hungarian International	(Russia) Olga Golovanova	(Denmark) Celine Juel (Denmark) Josephine van Zaane	21–17, 19–21, 21–11	(gold) Winner
2013	Norwegian International	(Russia) Olga Golovanova	(Denmark) Julie Finne-Ipsen (Denmark) Rikke Søby Hansen	14–21, 22–24	(silver) Runner-up
2014	Austrian International	(Russia) Olga Golovanova	(Bulgaria) Gabriela Stoeva (Bulgaria) Stefani Stoeva	17–21, 22–20, 15–21	(silver) Runner-up
2014	Hellas International	(Russia) Elena Komendrovskaja	(Turkey) Özge Bayrak (Turkey) Neslihan Yiğit	7–21, 14–21	(silver) Runner-up
2014	Lithuanian International	(Russia) Anastasia Dobrinina	(Estonia) Kristin Kuuba (Estonia) Helina Rüütel	21–19, 21–19	(gold) Winner
2014	White Nights	(Russia) Olga Golovanova	(Russia) Ekaterina Bolotova (Russia) Evgeniya Kosetskaya	14–21, 24–26	(silver) Runner-up
2018	Kazakhstan International	(Russia) Daria Dzhedzhula	(Russia) Ekaterina Kadochnikova (Russia) Anastasia Redkina	22–24, 19–21	(silver) Runner-up

Mixed doubles
Year	Tournament	Partner	Opponent	Score	Result
2013	White Nights	(Russia) Sergey Shumilkin	(Germany) Peter Käsbauer (Germany) Isabel Herttrich	22–24, 15–21	(silver) Runner-up
2013	Hatzor International	(Russia) Vladimir Malkov	(Czech Republic) Jan Fröhlich (Russia) Katerina Zvereva	21–13, 21–12	(gold) Winner
2013	Norwegian International	(Russia) Vasily Kuznetsov	(Denmark) Alexander Bond (Denmark) Rikke Søby Hansen	21–19, 21–7	(gold) Winner
2013	Turkey International	(Russia) Vasily Kuznetsov	(Finland) Anton Kaisti (Bulgaria) Stefani Stoeva	9–21, 15–21	(silver) Runner-up
2018	Kazakhstan International	(Russia) Rodion Kargaev	(Kazakhstan) Dmitriy Panarin (Russia) Anastasiia Pustinskaia	21–13, 21–18	(gold) Winner

BWF International Challenge tournament
BWF International Series tournament
BWF Future Series tournament
