= Brice Leverdez =

French badminton player (born 1986)

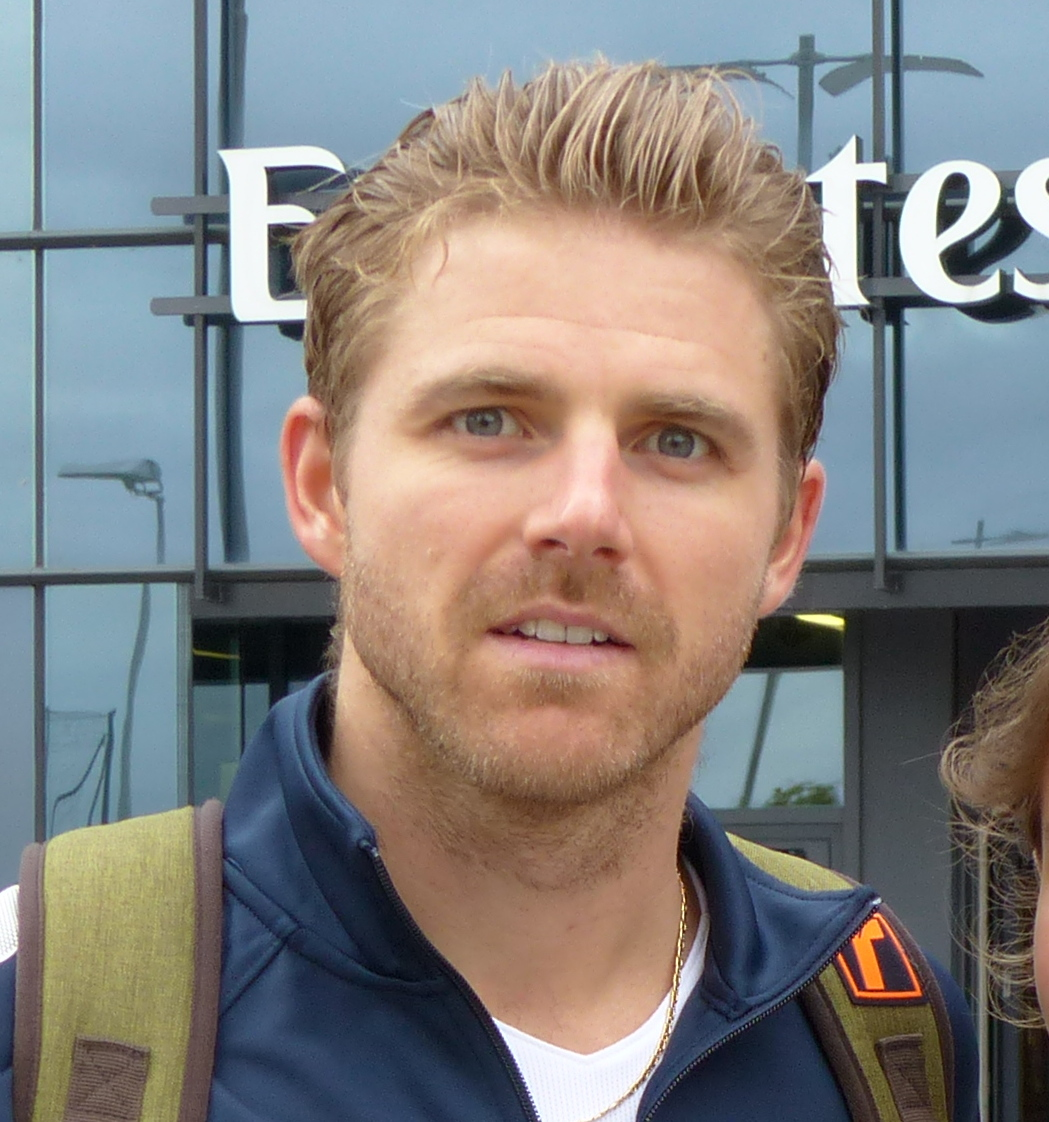
- Leverdez in 2017

Personal information
- Born: 9 April 1986 (age 40) La Garenne-Colombes, France
- Years active: 2005–present
- Height: 1.80 m (5 ft 11 in)
- Weight: 75 kg (165 lb)

Sport
- Country: France
- Sport: Badminton
- Handedness: Right

Men's singles & doubles
- Highest ranking: 19 (MS 12 July 2018); 49 (MD 26 June 2014)
- Current ranking: 40 (MS 31 January 2023)
- BWF profile
Medal record
Men's badminton
Representing France
World Senior Championships
Silver medal – second place	2025 Pattaya	Men's doubles 35+
Bronze medal – third place	2025 Pattaya	Mixed doubles 35+
European Games
Silver medal – second place	2019 Minsk	Men's singles
European Championships
Bronze medal – third place	2018 Huelva	Men's singles
European Men's Team Championships
Silver medal – second place	2016 Kazan	Men's team
Bronze medal – third place	2018 Kazan	Men's team
Bronze medal – third place	2020 Liévin	Men's team
Mediterranean Games
Gold medal – first place	2013 Mersin	Men's singles
European Junior Championships
Bronze medal – third place	2005 Den Bosch	Boys' doubles

Brice Leverdez (born 9 April 1986) is a French badminton player. He was a champion at the 2013 Mediterranean Games, won a silver medal at the 2015 European Games, and a bronze medal at the 2018 European Championships.

== Career ==
Leverdez started playing badminton at aged 12, and continued after that at the club, then in 2008, he joined France national badminton team. In 2005, he won bronze medal at the European Junior Badminton Championships in boys' doubles event partnered with Matthieu Lo Ying Ping. He won French National Badminton Championships in men's singles event from 2008 to 2015. In 2012, he competed in men's singles event at the Summer Olympic Games held in London. During group stage, he had defeated Edwin Ekiring 21-12, 21-11, but was defeated by Wong Wing Ki 21-11, 21-16. He finished second place in group stage, and did not advance. In 2013, he won gold medal at the Mediterranean Games in men's singles event. In 2016, he won silver medal at the European Men's Team Championships in men's team event. In the same year, he competed at the Summer Olympic Games held in Rio de Janeiro, Brazil. In the group stage, he defeating Raul Must 21-18, 18-21, 21-12, and defeated by Jan Ø. Jørgensen 21-11, 21-18. He did not advance to the final stage after finished second in group stage.

In February, Leverdez won his ninth National Championships title. He qualified to represent France at the 2019 European Games in Minsk, Belarus. He finished as the runner-up and won a silver medal after being defeated by Anders Antonsen in the final with the score 19–21, 21–14, 10–21.

== Achievements ==
=== World Senior Championships ===
Men's doubles
Year	Age	Venue	Partner	Opponent	Score	Result	Ref.
2025	35+	Eastern National Sports Training Centre; Pattaya, Thailand	(France) Laurent Constantin	(Singapore) Danny Bawa Chrisnanta (Indonesia) Fernando Kurniawan	14–21, 16–21	Silver	

Mixed doubles
Year	Age	Venue	Partner	Opponent	Score	Result	Ref.
2025	35+	Eastern National Sports Training Centre; Pattaya, Thailand	(France) Julie Leverdez	(Indonesia) Hendra Setiawan (Indonesia) Debby Susanto	11–21, 10–21	Bronze	

=== European Games ===
Men's singles
Year	Venue	Opponent	Score	Result
2019	Falcon Club, Minsk, Belarus	(Denmark) Anders Antonsen	19–21, 21–14, 10–21	Silver

=== European Championships ===
Men's singles
Year	Venue	Opponent	Score	Result
2018	Palacio de los Deportes Carolina Marín, Huelva, Spain	(Denmark) Viktor Axelsen	7–21, 9–21	Bronze

=== Mediterranean Games ===
Men's singles
Year	Venue	Opponent	Score	Result
2013	Mersin University Hall, Mersin, Turkey	(Spain) Pablo Abián	21–17, 23–21	Gold

=== European Junior Championships ===
Boys' doubles
Year	Venue	Partner	Opponent	Score	Result
2005	De Maaspoort; Den Bosch, Netherlands	(France) Matthieu Lo Ying Ping	(Denmark) Rasmus Bonde (Denmark) Kasper Henriksen	15–11, 8–15, 7–15	Bronze

=== BWF Grand Prix (1 title, 2 runners-up) ===
The BWF Grand Prix had two levels, the Grand Prix and Grand Prix Gold. It was a series of badminton tournaments sanctioned by the Badminton World Federation (BWF) and played between 2007 and 2017.

Men's singles
Year	Tournament	Opponent	Score	Result
2010	U.S. Open	(England) Rajiv Ouseph	17–21, 9–21	(silver) Runner-up
2010	Canada Open	(Indonesia) Taufik Hidayat	15–21, 11–21	(silver) Runner-up
2013	Scottish Open	(Sweden) Henri Hurskainen	21–8, 16–21, 21–16	(gold) Winner

BWF Grand Prix Gold tournament
BWF Grand Prix tournament

=== BWF International Challenge/Series (13 titles, 3 runners-up) ===
Men's singles
Year	Tournament	Opponent	Score	Result
2007	Ecuador International	(Portugal) Fernandes Ricardo	21–17, 21–16	(gold) Winner
2007	Carebaco International	(United States) Raju Rai	21–12, 21–17	(gold) Winner
2008	Welsh International	(Scotland) Kieran Merrilees	21–15, 18–21, 21–19	(gold) Winner
2010	Canadian International	(Lithuania) Kęstutis Navickas	16–21, 21–18, 14–21	(silver) Runner-up
2011	Kharkiv International	(Ukraine) Dmytro Zavadsky	9–21, 21–14, 21–14	(gold) Winner
2011	Belgian International	(Indonesia) Andre Kurniawan Tedjono	21–7, 13–21, 21–11	(gold) Winner
2012	Spanish Open	(Sweden) Gabriel Ulldahl	21–14, 22–24, 21–18	(gold) Winner
2013	Tahiti International	(France) Matthieu Lo Ying Ping	21–14, 21–6	(gold) Winner
2013	Swiss International	(Russia) Vladimir Malkov	22–20, 21–14	(gold) Winner
2013	Puerto Rico International	(Brazil) Daniel Paiola	21–17, 21–14	(gold) Winner
2014	Polish Open	(Denmark) Rasmus Fladberg	21–6, 21–16	(gold) Winner
2015	Italian International	(Germany) Marc Zwiebler	21–17, 14–21, 26–24	(gold) Winner
2020	Portugal International	(France) Lucas Corvée	21–10, 21–12	(gold) Winner

Men's doubles
Year	Tournament	Partner	Opponent	Score	Result
2013	Swiss International	(France) Lucas Corvée	(Germany) Daniel Benz (Malaysia) Chan Kwong Beng	16–21, 16–21	(silver) Runner-up
2013	Puerto Rico International	(France) Lucas Corvée	(France) Laurent Constantin (France) Matthieu Lo Ying Ping	21–14, 21–12	(silver) Runner-up
2020	Portugal International	(France) Lucas Corvée	(Scotland) Christopher Grimley (Scotland) Matthew Grimley	26–24, 24–22	(gold) Winner

BWF International Challenge tournament
BWF International Series tournament
BWF Future Series tournament
