= Alfred Kivisaar =

Estonian badminton player (1953–2021)

Alfred Kivisaar (8 January 1953 – 18 January 2021) was an Estonian badminton player.

He was born in Tallinn. In 1975 he graduated from the University of Tartu's Institute of Physical Education.

He began his badminton career in 1964. He was multiple-times Estonian champion. 1973–1978 he was a member of Estonian national badminton team.

He was also a badminton coach. Students: Raul Must.

1980–2001 he was a member of Estonian Badminton Federation. Since 2007 he was the head of Tallinn Badminton School.
