= Mart Siliksaar =

Estonian badminton player and coach

Mart Siliksaar (born 15 November 1949) is an Estonian badminton player and coach.

He was born in Tartu. In 1983 he graduated from University of Tartu's Institute of Physical Education.

He began his badminton career under the guidance of Helmut Valgmaa. He is multiple-times Estonian champion. 1974–1979 he was a member of Estonian national badminton team.

Since 1970s he is also working as a badminton coach. 1986–2005 he was the head coach of Estonian national badminton team. Students: Ain Matvere, Anneli Lambing, Kati Tolmoff, Raul Must, Kristin Kuuba, Helina Rüütel.

Awards:

- 2021: National Sports Lifetime Achievement Award (Estonian: riiklik spordi elutööpreemia)
