= Hele-Mall Pajumägi =

Estonian badminton player and coach

Hele-Mall Pajumägi (until 1959 Karm; born 1 February 1938) is an Estonian badminton player and coach.

She was born in Tartu. In 1960 she graduated from Tartu State University's Institute of Physical Education.

She began her badminton career in 1960. She is multiple-times Estonian champion. 1964–1966 she was a member of Estonian national badminton team.

1963–1967 he was the coach of Estonian Badminton Federation's team. 1970–1970 he was the badminton coach at Tallinn University of Technology.
