= Matthieu Lo Ying Ping =

French badminton player (born 1986)

Personal information
- Nickname: Ping Pong
- Born: 3 August 1986 (age 40) Paris, France
- Height: 1.80 m (5 ft 11 in)
- Weight: 68 kg (150 lb)

Sport
- Country: France
- Sport: Badminton
- Handedness: Left

Men's singles & doubles
- Highest ranking: 36 (MS 10 June 2010); 46 (MD 12 March 2015); 505 (XD 17 July 2014)
- BWF profile
Medal record
Men's badminton
Representing France
Mediterranean Games
Bronze medal – third place	2013 Mersin	Men's singles
European Junior Championships
Bronze medal – third place	2005 Den Bosch	Boys' doubles

Matthieu Lo Ying Ping (Chinese: 马修·罗英平, born 3 August 1986) is a French badminton player. Born to a Chinese father and a French mother, He started playing badminton at aged 10 at the Union St Bruno Club in Bordeaux, 4 years later he joined Espoir de Talence Bordeaux and when he was 18 he joined the France national badminton team at INSEP. In 2005, he won bronze medal at the European Junior Badminton Championships in boys' doubles event.

== Achievements ==
=== Mediterranean Games ===
Men's singles
Year	Venue	Opponent	Score	Result
2013	Mersin University Hall; Mersin, Turkey	(Slovenia) Iztok Utroša	21–17, 21–17	Bronze

=== European Junior Championships ===
Boys' doubles
Year	Venue	Partner	Opponent	Score	Result
2005	De Maaspoort; Den Bosch, Netherlands	(France) Brice Leverdez	(Denmark) Rasmus Bonde (Denmark) Kasper Henriksen	15–11, 8–15, 7–15	Bronze

=== BWF International Challenge/Series ===
Men's singles
Year	Tournament	Opponent	Score	Result
2010	Austrian International	(Indonesia) Andre Kurniawan Tedjono	12–21, 11–21	(silver) Runner-up
2013	Tahiti International	(France) Brice Leverdez	14–21, 6–21	(silver) Runner-up

Men's doubles
Year	Tournament	Partner	Opponent	Score	Result
2013	Estonian International	(France) Laurent Constantin	(Finland) Iikka Heino (Finland) Mika Köngäs	21–11, 22–20	(gold) Winner
2013	Tahiti International	(France) Laurent Constantin	(Netherlands) Ruud Bosch (Netherlands) Koen Ridder	13–21, 10–21	(silver) Runner-up
2013	Puerto Rico International	(France) Laurent Constantin	(France) Lucas Corvée (France) Brice Leverdez	14–21, 12–21	(silver) Runner-up
2014	Estonian International	(France) Laurent Constantin	(Russia) Nikita Khakimov (Russia) Vasily Kuznetsov	21–14, 13–21, 19–21	(silver) Runner-up
2014	Guatemala International	(France) Laurent Constantin	(Guatemala) Rodolfo Ramírez (Guatemala) Jonathan Solís	11–9, 11–7, 9–11, 9–11, 11–10	(gold) Winner
2014	Brazil International	(France) Laurent Constantin	(France) Bastian Kersaudy (France) Gaëtan Mittelheisser	9–11, 11–9, 7–11, 5–11	(silver) Runner-up
2015	Estonian International	(France) Laurent Constantin	(Finland) Mika Köngäs (Finland) Jesper von Hertzen	21–14, 21–19	(gold) Winner

BWF International Challenge tournament
BWF International Series tournament
BWF Future Series tournament
