= Natalia Rogova =

Russian badminton player

Personal information
- Born: Natalia Mihaylovna Rogova (Наталья Михайловна Рогова); 29 May 1995 (age 31) Moscow, Russia

Sport
- Country: Russia
- Sport: Badminton

Women's & mixed doubles
- Highest ranking: 118 (WD, 28 March 2013; 220 (XD, 27 April 2017)
- BWF profile

Natalia Mihaylovna Rogova (Russian: Наталья Михайловна Рогова; born 29 May 1995) is a Russian badminton player who is affiliated with Primorye Vladivostok badminton club. She won her first international title at the 2017 Slovenia International Series in the women's doubles partnered with Olga Arkhangelskaya.

== Achievements ==
=== BWF International Challenge/Series ===
Women's doubles
Year	Tournament	Partner	Opponent	Score	Result
2017	Slovenia International	(Russia) Olga Arkhangelskaya	(England) Jenny Moore (England) Victoria Williams	22–20, 21–17	(gold) Winner
2017	Latvia International	(Russia) Olga Arkhangelskaya	(Estonia) Kristin Kuuba (Estonia) Helina Rüütel	18–21, 21–13, 21–19	(gold) Winner

Commonwealth Youth Games tournament
BWF International Series tournament
BWF Future Series tournament
