= Ain Matvere =

Estonian badminton player

Ain Matvere (born 13 January 1967 – 14 May 2018) was an Estonian badminton player.

He was born in Tartu.

He began his badminton career in 1978, coached by Mart Siliksaar. He is multiple-times Estonian champion. 1983–1989 he was a member of Estonian national badminton team.

Since 1989 he worked as a badminton coach. Students: Kati Tolmoff.

In 1984 he was named as Best Badminton Player of Estonia.
