= Jordan Hart =

Polish badminton player

Personal information
- Born: 26 January 1995 (age 31) Haverfordwest, Pembrokeshire, Wales
- Height: 1.75 m (5 ft 9 in)

Sport
- Country: Wales (until 2021, 2022–present); Poland (2021–2022)
- Sport: Badminton
- Handedness: Righ
- Coached by: Steve Butler

Women's singles
- Highest ranking: 61 (2 November 2021)
- Current ranking: 86 (31 January 2023)
- BWF profile

Jordan Hart (born 26 January 1995) is a Welsh badminton player. She was a Poland national badminton team member between 2021 and 26 September 2022. She made her international debut in 2009 Welsh International. She has won seven Welsh National Championships title, 5 times in the women's singles event from 2016 to 2020, once in the mixed and women's doubles in 2012 and 2020 respectively. 2019 was the golden year for Hart, where she achieved title wins in many international tournaments, some of them were in Jamaica, Giraldilla, Carebaco, Latvia and Polish International tournaments.

== Achievements ==
=== BWF International Challenge/Series (5 titles, 4 runners-up) ===
Women's singles
Year	Tournament	Opponent	Score	Result
2017	Polish International	(Switzerland) Ayla Huser	19–21, 22–24	(silver) Runner-up
2018	Lithuanian International	(Estonia) Kristin Kuuba	23–21, 18–21, 18–21	(silver) Runner-up
2019	Slovak Open	(Thailand) Porntip Buranaprasertsuk	17–21, 17–21	(silver) Runner-up
2019	Jamaica International	(Israel) Ksenia Polikarpova	23–21, 21–18	(gold) Winner
2019	Giraldilla International	(Peru) Daniela Macías	21–17, 21–16	(gold) Winner
2019	Latvia International	(Germany) Thuc Phuong Nguyen	22–20, 21–18	(gold) Winner
2019	Carebaco International	(Finland) Airi Mikkelä	21–15, 21–16	(gold) Winner
2019	Polish International	(Denmark) Irina Amalie Andersen	18–21, 21–13, 21–13	(gold) Winner
2019	Egypt International	(Myanmar) Thet Htar Thuzar	6–21, 1–12^{r}	(silver) Runner-up

Commonwealth Youth Games tournament
BWF International Series tournament
BWF Future Series tournament
