= Andres Ojamaa =

Estonian badminton player

Andres Ojamaa (3 August 1969 – c. 8 August 1993) was an Estonian badminton player.

He was born in Tartu.

He began his badminton career in 1976, coached by Mart Siliksaar. He was multiple-times Estonian champion. 1986–1992 he was a member of Estonian national badminton team. Ojamaa disappeared in 1993 and is presumed deceased.
