= Kalle Kaljurand =

Estonian badminton player

Kalle Kaljurand (born 12 May 1960) is an Estonian badminton player.

He was born in Tartu. In 1983 he graduated from University of Tartu with a degree in economic cybernetics, and 2002 from the university of Tartu with a degree in business management.

His badminton coach was Mart Siliksaar. He is multiple-times Estonian champion. 1982–1991 he was a member of Estonian national badminton team.

Since 2005 he has been a leader of publishing house Koolibri.

His wife is diplomat Marina Kaljurand, they have two children: Kaisa and Kristjan.
