= Kati Tolmoff =

Estonian badminton player

Personal information
- Born: 3 December 1983 (age 42) Tartu, then part of Estonian SSR, Soviet Union
- Height: 1.65 m (5 ft 5 in)
- Weight: 61 kg (134 lb)

Sport
- Country: Estonia
- Sport: Badminton
- Handedness: Right
- Coached by: Michael Kjeldsen

Women's singles
- Highest ranking: 45 (22 October 2009)
- BWF profile

Kati Tolmoff (born 3 December 1983 in Tartu) is a badminton player from Estonia. She represented Estonia at the 2008 and 2016 Olympic Games. She competed in the women's singles event, where she lost to Chloe Magee 21–18, 18–21, and 19–21 in the first round. In 2016, she was the runner-up in the group K stage, lose a match to Ratchanok Intanon, and won a match to Yip Pui Yin. In September 2009, Tolmoff announced that because of a lack of money, her professional career was over. But she returned in 2014. Tolmoff also competed at the 2015 Baku European Games.

== Awards ==
- Estonian National Badminton Championships, women's singles, 12 times
- Estonian National Badminton Championships, women's doubles, 6 times
- Estonian National Badminton Championships, mixed doubles, 6 times

== Achievements ==
=== BWF International Challenge/Series ===
Women's singles
Year	Tournament	Opponent	Score	Result
2015	Mersin Turkey International	(Germany) Karin Schnaase	17–21, 5–21	(silver) Runner-up
2015	Norwegian International	(Denmark) Sofie Holmboe Dahl	13–21, 12–21	(silver) Runner-up
2015	Turkey International	(Hungary) Laura Sarosi	21–13, 21–11	(gold) Winner
2015	Estonian International	(Russia) Olga Golovanova	21–23, 21–13, 18–21	(silver) Runner-up
2008	Welsh International	(Netherlands) Rachel Van Cutsen	22–20, 18–21, 21–13	(gold) Winner
2008	Scottish International	(England) Elizabeth Cann	21–16, 10–21, 12–21	(silver) Runner-up
2008	European Circuit Finals	(Germany) Juliane Schenk	16–21, 14–21	(silver) Runner-up
2007	Cyprus International	(Denmark) Karina Jørgensen	21–14, 21–19	(gold) Winner
2007	Kalev International	(Germany) Carola Bott	21–14, 21–19	(gold) Winner
2007	Dutch International	(Ukraine) Larisa Griga	12–21, 21–15, 22–20	(gold) Winner
2007	Swedish International	(China) Li Wenyan	11–21, 6–21	(silver) Runner-up
2006	Lithuanian International	(Slovenia) Maja Tvrdy	21–19, 15–21, 15–21	(silver) Runner-up
2006	Estonian International	(Ukraine) Elena Prus	21–13, 21–17	(gold) Winner
2006	Croatian International	(Bulgaria) Petya Nedelcheva	14–21, 18–21	(silver) Runner-up
2005	Latvia Riga International	(Poland) Kamila Augustyn	0–11, 1–11	(silver) Runner-up
2005	Estonian International	(Austria) Simone Prutsch	11–6, 11–3	(gold) Winner
2004	Lithuanian International	(Lithuania) Ugne Urbonaite	11–0, 11–2	(gold) Winner
2004	Estonian International	(Austria) Simone Prutsch	11–5, 11–5	(gold) Winner

Women's doubles
Year	Tournament	Partner	Opponent	Score	Result
2008	Croatian International	(Denmark) Maria Thorberg	(Russia) Tatyana Bibik (Russia) Olga Golovanova	24–22, 21–15	(gold) Winner
2007	Cyprus International	(Iceland) Ragna Ingólfsdóttir	(India) Jwala Gutta (India) Shruti Kurian	12–21, 13–21	(silver) Runner-up
2005	Latvia Riga International	(Estonia) Kai-Riin Saluste	(Estonia) Helen Reino (Estonia) Piret Hamer	15–9, 15–8	(gold) Winner
2004	Lithuanian International	(Lithuania) Kristina Dovidaitytė	(Lithuania) Ugnė Urbonaitė (Lithuania) Akvilė Stapušaitytė	15–7, 15–2	(gold) Winner
2004	Estonian International	(England) Solenn Pasturel	(Estonia) Helen Reino (Estonia) Piret Hamer	15–8, 16–17, 15–7	(gold) Winner
1999	Lithuanian International	(Estonia) Piret Hamer	(Poland) Katarzyna Krasowska (Poland) Joanna Szleszyńska	6–15, 2–15	(silver) Runner-up

Mixed doubles
Year	Tournament	Partner	Opponent	Score	Result
1999	Lithuanian International	(Estonia) Indrek Küüts	(Lithuania) Dainius Mikalauskas (Lithuania) Jurate Preveliene	14–17, 17–14, 15–5	(gold) Winner

BWF International Challenge tournament
BWF International Series tournament
BWF Future Series tournament
