= Michał Rogalski =

Polish badminton player (born 1987)

Personal information
- Born: 23 June 1987 (age 39) Wrocław, Poland
- Height: 1.94 m (6 ft 4 in)
- Weight: 82 kg (181 lb)

Sport
- Country: Poland
- Sport: Badminton
- Coached by: Jerzy Leszczyński

Men's singles & doubles
- Highest ranking: 70 (MS 20 August 2015); 94 (MD 15 October 2009)
- BWF profile
Medal record
Men's badminton
Representing Poland
European Men's Team Championships
Silver medal – second place	2010 Warsaw	Men's team

Michał Rogalski (born 23 June 1987) is a Polish badminton player. He competed at the 2015 and 2019 European Games.

== Achievements ==
=== BWF International Challenge/Series (2 titles, 6 runners-up) ===
Men's singles
Year	Tournament	Opponent	Score	Result
2013	Bulgaria Eurasia Open	(Slovenia) Iztok Utroša	18–21, 21–11, 21–12	(gold) Winner
2013	Slovak Open	(Ukraine) Vitaly Konov	18–21, 23–25	(silver) Runner-up
2014	Hellas International	(Denmark) Kim Bruun	16–21, 13–21	(silver) Runner-up
2014	Bulgarian Eurasia Open	(Estonia) Raul Must	6–11, 11–10, 11–8, 10–11, 9–11	(silver) Runner-up
2014	Polish International	(Indonesia) Adi Pratama	11–9, 8–11, 11–6, 11–7	(gold) Winner
2018	Lithuanian International	(Sweden) Felix Burestedt	12–21, 21–23	(silver) Runner-up

Men's doubles
Year	Tournament	Partner	Opponent	Score	Result
2008	Banuinvest International	(Poland) Łukasz Moreń	(Bulgaria) Krasimir Jankov (Bulgaria) Vladimir Metodiev	17–21, 21–14, 15–21	(silver) Runner-up
2018	Hellas Open	(Poland) Adrian Dziółko	(India) Arjun M.R. (India) Ramchandran Shlok	13–21, 11–21	(silver) Runner-up

BWF International Challenge tournament
BWF International Series tournament
BWF Future Series tournament
