= Kati-Kreet Käsner =

Estonian badminton player (born 1998)

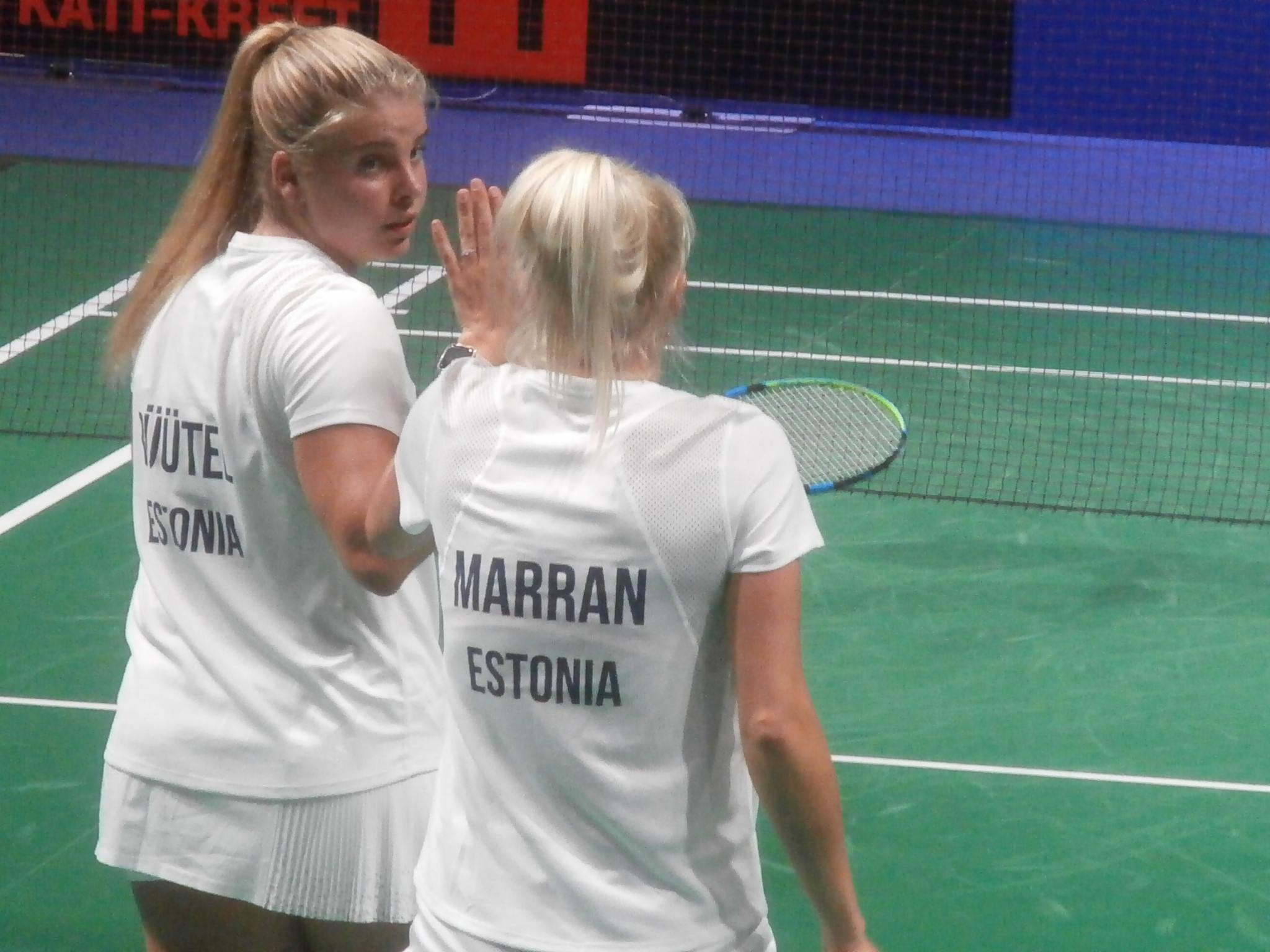
- Käsner with her parther Helina Rüütel at the 2019 European Games

Personal information
- Born: Kati-Kreet Marran; 13 July 1998 (age 28) Tartu, Estonia
- Height: 1.74 m (5 ft 9 in)

Sport
- Country: Estonia
- Sport: Badminton
- Handedness: Right
- Coached by: Mart Siliksaar

Women's singles & doubles
- Highest ranking: 144 (WS 30 August 2018); 43 (WD with Helina Rüütel 11 May 2021); 164 (XD with Sander Merits 12 July 2018)
- BWF profile

Kati-Kreet Käsner (née Marran; born 13 July 1998) is an Estonian badminton player. She competed at the 2019 European Games, reaching the quarter finals in the women's doubles partnered with Helina Rüütel.

began badminton training in 2008 under training of Mart Mäeranna. She has trained with Mart Siliksaar since 2017.

She is married to badminton player Raul Käsner.

== Achievements ==
=== BWF International Challenge/Series (6 titles, 5 runners-up) ===
Women's doubles
Year	Tournament	Partner	Opponent	Score	Result
2014	Riga International	(Estonia) Sale-Liis Teesalu	(Denmark) Emilie Juul Moller (Denmark) Cecilie Sentow	Walkover	(silver) Runner-up
2018	Kharkiv International	(Estonia) Kristin Kuuba	(Sweden) Amanda Högström (Sweden) Clara Nistad	8–21, 11–21	(silver) Runner-up
2018	Norwegian International	(Estonia) Helina Rüütel	(Denmark) Gabriella Bøje (Denmark) Marie Louise Steffensen	12–21, 17–21	(silver) Runner-up
2019	Slovak Open	(Estonia) Helina Rüütel	(Germany) Lisa Kaminski (Germany) Hannah Pohl	21–13, 21–9	(gold) Winner
2019	Latvia International	(Estonia) Helina Rüütel	(Sweden) Edith Urell (Sweden) Cecilia Wang	22–20, 21–9	(gold) Winner
2020	Latvia International	(Estonia) Helina Rüütel	(Italy) Katharina Fink (Italy) Yasmine Hamza	21–11, 21–12	(gold) Winner
2021	Portugal International	(Estonia) Helina Rüütel	(Denmark) Christine Busch (Denmark) Amalie Schulz	16–21, 14–21	(silver) Runner-up
2022	Latvia International	(Estonia) Helina Rüütel	(Poland) Dominika Kwasnik (Poland) Kornelia Marczak	20–22, 21–14, 21–16	(gold) Winner
2023	Lithuanian International	(Estonia) Helina Rüütel	(Indonesia) Meisa Rizka Fitria (Indonesia) Maulida Aprilia Putri	18–21, 23–21, 21–7	(gold) Winner
2023	Latvia International	(Estonia) Helina Rüütel	(Germany) Amelie Lehmann (Germany) Marie Sophie Stern	21–9, 21–9	(gold) Winner
2023	Norwegian International	(Estonia) Helina Rüütel	(Denmark) Amalie Cecilie Kudsk (Denmark) Signe Schulz	16–21, 19–21	(silver) Runner-up

BWF International Challenge tournament
BWF International Series tournament
BWF Future Series tournament
