= Helina Rüütel =

Estonian badminton player

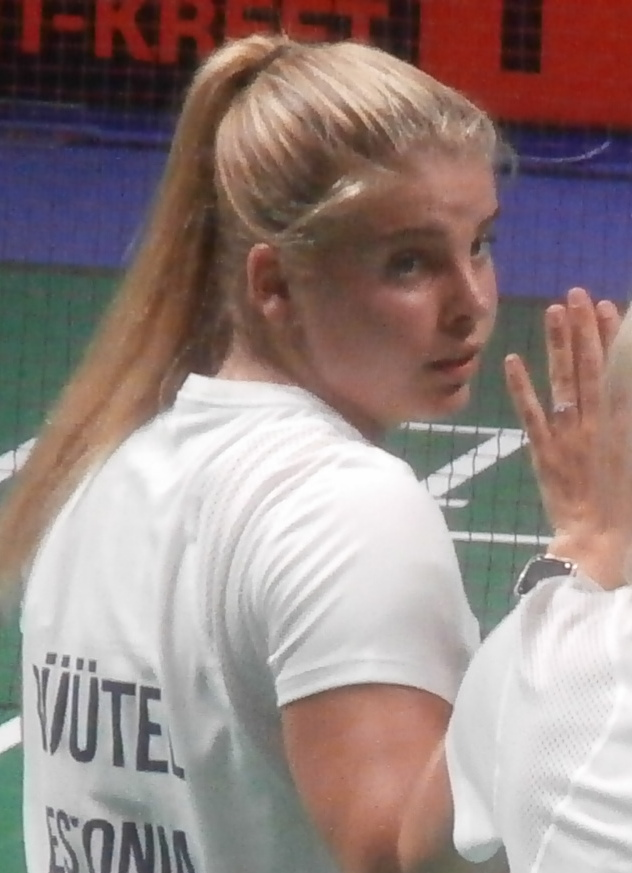
- Rüütel at the 2019 European Games

Personal information
- Born: 11 August 1997 (age 29) Tartu, Estonia
- Height: 1.68 m (5 ft 6 in)
- Weight: 65 kg (143 lb)

Sport
- Country: Estonia
- Sport: Badminton
- Handedness: Left
- Coached by: Mart Mäerand

Women's singles & doubles
- Highest ranking: 184 (WS 21 December 2017); 43 (WD with Kati-Kreet Marran 11 May 2021); 109 (XD with Mihkel Laanes 11 May 2021)
- BWF profile
Medal record
Women's badminton
Representing Estonia
European Junior Championships
Bronze medal – third place	2015 Lubin	Girls' doubles

Helina Rüütel (born 11 August 1997) is an Estonian badminton player who joined the national team in 2013.

== Career ==
In 2015, she won bronze medal at the European Junior Championships in girls' doubles event with her partner Kristin Kuuba.

In 2019, she competed at the 2019 European Games, reaching the quarter finals in the women's doubles partnered with Kati-Kreet Marran.

== Achievements ==
=== European Junior Championships ===
Girls' doubles
Year	Venue	Partner	Opponent	Score	Result
2015	Regional Sport Centrum Hall; Lubin, Poland	(Estonia) Kristin Kuuba	(France) Verlaine Faulmann (France) Anne Tran	21–19, 16–21, 15–21	Bronze

=== BWF International Challenge/Series (16 titles, 7 runners-up) ===
Women's singles
Year	Tournament	Opponent	Score	Result
2013	Riga International	(Latvia) Ieva Pope	21–19, 21–17	(gold) Winner

Women's doubles
Year	Tournament	Partner	Opponent	Score	Result
2013	Riga International	(Estonia) Kristin Kuuba	(Latvia) Ieva Pope (Latvia) Kristīne Šefere	21–15, 16–21, 21–14	(gold) Winner
2014	Lithuanian International	(Estonia) Kristin Kuuba	(Russia) Anastasia Dobrinina (Russia) Viktoriia Vorobeva	19–21, 19–21	(silver) Runner-up
2015	Riga International	(Estonia) Kristin Kuuba	(France) Vimala Hériau (France) Margot Lambert	20–22, 21–17, 21–12	(gold) Winner
2016	Estonian International	(Estonia) Kristin Kuuba	(Russia) Anastasia Chervyakova (Russia) Olga Morozova	14–21, 15–21	(silver) Runner-up
2017	Croatian International	(Estonia) Kristin Kuuba	(Denmark) Anne Hald (Denmark) Lisa Kramer	21–12, 21–9	(gold) Winner
2017	Czech International	(Estonia) Kristin Kuuba	(Ukraine) Maryna Ilyinskaya (Ukraine) Yelyzaveta Zharka	21–13, 19–21, 16–21	(silver) Runner-up
2017	Latvia International	(Estonia) Kristin Kuuba	(Russia) Olga Arkhangelskaya (Russia) Natalia Rogova	21–18, 13–21, 19–21	(silver) Runner up
2017	Lithuanian International	(Estonia) Kristin Kuuba	(Denmark) Anne Hald (Denmark) Lisa Kramer	21–11, 21–13	(gold) Winner
2017	Morocco International	(Estonia) Kristin Kuuba	(Jordan) Haneen Derar Al-Wedyan (Jordan) Domou Amro	21–8, 21–9	(gold) Winner
2018	Latvia International	(Estonia) Kristin Kuuba	(France) Ainoa Desmons (France) Juliette Moinard	21–17, 21–16	(gold) Winner
2018	Lithuanian International	(Estonia) Kristin Kuuba	(Denmark) Christine Busch (Denmark) Amalie Schulz	22–20, 21–9	(gold) Winner
2018	Norwegian International	(Estonia) Kati-Kreet Marran	(Denmark) Gabriella Bøje (Denmark) Marie Louise Steffensen	12–21, 17–21	(silver) Runner-up
2019	Slovak Open	(Estonia) Kati-Kreet Marran	(Germany) Lisa Kaminski (Germany) Hannah Pohl	21–13, 21–9	(gold) Winner
2019	Latvia International	(Estonia) Kati-Kreet Marran	(Sweden) Edith Urell (Sweden) Cecilia Wang	22–20, 21–9	(gold) Winner
2020	Latvia International	(Estonia) Kati-Kreet Marran	(Italy) Katharina Fink (Italy) Yasmine Hamza	21–11, 21–12	(gold) Winner
2021	Portugal International	(Estonia) Kati-Kreet Marran	(Denmark) Christine Busch (Denmark) Amalie Schulz	16–21, 14–21	(silver) Runner-up
2022	Latvia International	(Estonia) Kati-Kreet Marran	(Poland) Dominika Kwasnik (Poland) Kornelia Marczak	20–22, 21–14, 21–16	(gold) Winner
2023	Lithuanian International	(Estonia) Kati-Kreet Marran	(Indonesia) Meisa Rizka Fitria (Indonesia) Maulida Aprilia Putri	18–21, 23–21, 21–7	(gold) Winner
2023	Latvia International	(Estonia) Kati-Kreet Marran	(Germany) Amelie Lehmann (Germany) Marie Sophie Stern	21–9, 21–9	(gold) Winner
2023	Norwegian International	(Estonia) Kati-Kreet Marran	(Denmark) Amalie Cecilie Kudsk (Denmark) Signe Schulz	16–21, 19–21	(silver) Runner-up

Mixed doubles
Year	Tournament	Partner	Opponent	Score	Result
2020	Latvia International	(Estonia) Mihkel Laanes	(Estonia) Oskar Männik (Estonia) Ramona Üprus	21–15, 21–11	(gold) Winner
2024	Latvia International	(Estonia) Kristjan Kaljurand	(Republic of Ireland) Joshua Magee (Republic of Ireland) Moya Ryan	19–21, 21–16, 21–15	(gold) Winner

BWF International Challenge tournament
BWF International Series tournament
BWF Future Series tournament
