= Estonian Badminton Federation =

Sports governing body in Estonia

Estonian Badminton Federation (abbreviation EBF; also named as Badminton Estonia; Estonian: Eesti Sulgpalliliit) is one of the sport governing bodies in Estonia which deals with badminton.

EBF is established on 3 October 1965 in Tallinn. EBF is a member of Badminton World Federation (BWF) and Estonian Olympic Committee.

The executive leader of EBF is Mario Saunpere.
