= Kristin Kuuba =

Estonian badminton player (born 1997)

Personal information
- Nickname: Kupsik
- Born: 15 February 1997 (age 29) Tartu, Estonia
- Height: 1.76 m (5 ft 9 in)
- Weight: 69 kg (152 lb)

Sport
- Country: Estonia
- Sport: Badminton
- Handedness: Right
- Coached by: Ganesh Badri

Women's singles & doubles
- Highest ranking: 39 (WS 11 October 2022); 57 (WD with Helina Rüütel 10 May 2018)
- Current ranking: 74 (WS 16 July 2024)
- BWF profile
Medal record
Women's badminton
Representing Estonia
European Junior Championships
Bronze medal – third place	2015 Lubin	Girls' doubles

Kristin Kuuba (born 15 February 1997) is an Estonian badminton player. She was a bronze medalist at the 2015 European Junior Championships in the girls' doubles event with her partner Helina Rüütel. Kuuba competed at the 2014 Nanjing Youth Olympics; 2015 Baku and 2019 Minsk European Games; and at the 2020 Tokyo Olympics.

== Achievements ==
=== European Junior Championships ===
Girls' doubles
Year	Venue	Partner	Opponent	Score	Result
2015	Regional Sport Centrum Hall; Lubin, Poland	(Estonia) Helina Rüütel	(France) Verlaine Faulmann (France) Anne Tran	21–19, 16–21, 15–21	Bronze

=== BWF International Challenge/Series (12 titles, 9 runners-up) ===
Women's singles
Year	Tournament	Opponent	Score	Result
2017	Norwegian International	(India) Saili Rane	18–21, 9–21	(silver) Runner-up
2018	Latvia International	(Belarus) Alesia Zaitsava	21–10, 21–16	(gold) Winner
2018	Lithuanian International	(Wales) Jordan Hart	21–23, 21–18, 21–18	(gold) Winner
2021	Polish Open	(India) Tanya Hemanth	24–22, 21–14	(gold) Winner
2021	Dutch Open	(England) Abigail Holden	23–21, 21–18	(gold) Winner
2022	Estonian International	(Thailand) Thamonwan Nithiittikrai	19–21, 23–21, 21–15	(gold) Winner
2023	Estonian International	(Chinese Taipei) Huang Yu-hsun	21–13, 11–21, 11–21	(silver) Runner-up
2023	Denmark Masters	(Indonesia) Komang Ayu Cahya Dewi	16–21, 21–16, 21–10	(gold) Winner
2023	Scottish Open	(Turkey) Neslihan Arın	23–25, 13–21	(silver) Runner-up
2025	Portugal International	(Canada) Rachel Chan	20–22, 9–21	(silver) Runner-up

Women's doubles
Year	Tournament	Partner	Opponent	Score	Result
2014	Lithuanian International	(Estonia) Helina Rüütel	(Russia) Anastasia Dobrinina (Russia) Viktoriia Vorobeva	19–21, 19–21	(silver) Runner-up
2015	Riga International	(Estonia) Helina Rüütel	(France) Vimala Hériau (France) Margot Lambert	20–22, 21–17, 21–12	(gold) Winner
2016	Estonian International	(Estonia) Helina Rüütel	(Russia) Anastasia Chervyakova (Russia) Olga Morozova	14–21, 15–21	(silver) Runner-up
2017	Croatian International	(Estonia) Helina Rüütel	(Denmark) Anne Hald Jensen (Denmark) Lisa Kramer	21–12, 21–9	(gold) Winner
2017	Czech International	(Estonia) Helina Rüütel	(Ukraine) Maryna Ilyinskaya (Ukraine) Yelyzaveta Zharka	21–13, 19–21, 16–21	(silver) Runner-up
2017	Latvia International	(Estonia) Helina Rüütel	(Russia) Olga Arkhangelskaya (Russia) Natalia Rogova	21–18, 13–21, 19–21	(silver) Runner up
2017	Lithuanian International	(Estonia) Helina Rüütel	(Denmark) Anne Hald Jensen (Denmark) Lisa Kramer	21–11, 21–13	(gold) Winner
2017	Morocco International	(Estonia) Helina Rüütel	(Jordan) Haneen Derar Al-Wedyan (Jordan) Domou Amro	21–8, 21–9	(gold) Winner
2018	Latvia International	(Estonia) Helina Rüütel	(France) Ainoa Desmons (France) Juliette Moinard	21–17, 21–16	(gold) Winner
2018	Lithuanian International	(Estonia) Helina Rüütel	(Denmark) Christine Busch (Denmark) Amalie Schulz	22–20, 21–9	(gold) Winner
2018	Kharkiv International	(Estonia) Kati-Kreet Marran	(Sweden) Amanda Högström (Sweden) Clara Nistad	8–21, 11–21	(silver) Runner-up

BWF International Challenge tournament
BWF International Series tournament
BWF Future Series tournament
