= Helen Klaos =

Estonian badminton player (born 1983)

Personal information
- Born: Helen Reino; 25 January 1983 (age 43) Nõo, Estonia

Sport
- Country: Estonia
- Sport: Badminton
- Event: Women's singles & doubles

Women's singles & doubles
- BWF profile

Helen Klaos (née Reino; born 25 January 1983) is an Estonian badminton player.

== Career ==
She played at the 2005 World Badminton Championships in Anaheim and lost in the first round to Mia Audina of the Netherlands.
