= Raul Must =

Estonian badminton player (born 1987)

Personal information
- Born: November 9, 1987 (age 39) Tallinn, then part of Estonian SSR, Soviet Union
- Height: 1.76 m (5 ft 9 in)
- Weight: 70 kg (154 lb)

Sport
- Country: Estonia
- Sport: Badminton
- Handedness: Right
- Coached by: Per-Henrik Croona, Ge Cheng, Aigar Tõnus

Men's singles
- Highest ranking: 38 (30 June 2016)
- Current ranking: 82 (27 August 2020)
- BWF profile
Medal record
Men's badminton
Representing Estonia
European Games
| Bronze medal – third place | 2019 Minsk | Men's singles |

Raul Must (born November 9, 1987) is a badminton player from Estonia. He is a four time Olympian representing Estonia at the 2008 Beijing Olympics, 2012 London Olympics, 2016 Rio Olympics and also at the 2020 Tokyo Olympic Games. Must was a men's singles bronze medalist at the 2019 Minsk European Games.

== Career ==
Must played the 2007 BWF World Championships in men's singles, and was defeated in the first round by Björn Joppien, of Germany, 21–12, 21–11. Must also played the 2008 Olympic Games in men's singles, and was defeated in the first round by Przemysław Wacha, of Poland, 14–21, 15–21. At the 2012 Summer Olympics, he did not qualify from the group round. Winning his group match against Austrian Michael Lahnsteiner with 21–14, 21–18, but losing the other group match against Indonesian Simon Santoso 12–21, 8-21. At the 2016 Rio Olympics he again won a groupsmatch, this time against Brice Leverdez from France with 21–18, 12–21, 21–18. But lost the other groups match against Dane Jan Ø. Jørgensen with 8-21, 15-21 so didn't advance further. For the 2020 Tokyo Olympics Must has been placed by draw in a group with Chen Long from China and Pablo Abián from Spain.

== Achievements ==
=== European Games ===
Men's singles
| Year | Venue | Opponent | Score | Result |
|---|---|---|---|---|
| 2019 | Falcon Club; Minsk, Belarus | (France) Brice Leverdez | 20–22, 8–21 | Bronze |

=== BWF Grand Prix (2 runners-up) ===
The BWF Grand Prix has two levels, the BWF Grand Prix and Grand Prix Gold. It is a series of badminton tournaments sanctioned by the Badminton World Federation (BWF) since 2007.

Men's singles
| Year | Tournament | Opponent | Score | Result |
|---|---|---|---|---|
| 2015 | Dutch Open | (India) Ajay Jayaram | 12–21, 18–21 | (silver) Runner-up |
| 2015 | Russian Open | (Indonesia) Tommy Sugiarto | 16–21, 10–21 | (silver) Runner-up |

BWF Grand Prix Gold tournament
BWF Grand Prix tournament

=== BWF International Challenge/Series (6 titles, 9 runners-up) ===
Men's singles
| Year | Tournament | Opponent | Score | Result |
|---|---|---|---|---|
| 2019 | Belarus International | (China) Lei Lanxi | 10–21, 15–21 | (silver) Runner-up |
| 2017 | Estonian International | (England) Toby Penty | 16–21, 24–22, 21–13 | (gold) Winner |
| 2015 | Eurasia Bulgaria International | (France) Lucas Claerbout | 21–15, 22–20 | (gold) Winner |
| 2015 | Norwegian International | (Denmark) Soeren Toft Hansen | 21–16, 21–14 | (gold) Winner |
| 2014 | Bulgarian Eurasia Open | (Poland) Michal Rogalski | 11–6, 10–11, 8–11, 11–10, 11–9 | (gold) Winner |
| 2014 | Riga International | (Norway) Marius Myhre | 14–5, Retired | (gold) Winner |
| 2013 | Hungarian International | (Spain) Ernesto Velazquez | 14–21, 17–21 | (silver) Runner-up |
| 2013 | Lithuanian International | (Poland) Adrian Dziolko | 21–23, 13–21 | (silver) Runner-up |
| 2012 | Estonian International | (Finland) Ville Lång | 8–21, 15–21 | (silver) Runner-up |
| 2011 | Croatian International | (Germany) Dieter Domke | 16–21, 7–21 | (silver) Runner-up |
| 2011 | Estonian International | (Finland) Ville Lång | 15–21, 14–21 | (silver) Runner-up |
| 2010 | Finnish Open | (Finland) Ville Lång | 21–11, 21–10 | (gold) Winner |
| 2009 | Polish International | (Netherlands) Dicky Palyama | 12–21, 17–21 | (silver) Runner-up |
| 2008 | Bulgarian International | (Japan) Yuichi Ikeda | 17–21, 20–22 | (silver) Runner-up |
| 2008 | Banuinvest International | (Finland) Ville Lång | 17–21, 18–21 | (silver) Runner-up |

BWF International Challenge tournament
BWF International Series tournament
BWF Future Series tournament
