= Kristjan Kaljurand =

Estonian badminton player (born 1992)

Personal information
- Born: 13 July 1992 (age 34) Tallinn, Estonia
- Height: 1.89 m (6 ft 2 in)

Sport
- Country: Estonia
- Sport: Badminton
- Handedness: Right

Men's & mixed doubles
- Highest ranking: 133 (MD) 22 Sep 2016; 385 (XD) 12 Jun 2014
- BWF profile

Kristjan Kaljurand (born 13 July 1992) is an Estonian male badminton player.

== Achievements ==
=== BWF International Challenge/Series (3 titles, 4 runners-up) ===
Men's doubles
Year	Tournament	Partner	Opponent	Score	Result
2017	Latvia International	(Estonia) Raul Käsner	(France) Mathieu Gangloff (France) Tom Rodrigues	21–15, 21–19	(gold) Winner
2024	Finnish International	(Estonia) Raul Käsner	(Estonia) Karl Kert (Estonia) Tauri Kilk	21–15, 20–22, 18–21	(silver) Runner-up
2024	Lithuanian International	(Estonia) Raul Käsner	(France) Nicolas Hoareau (France) Aymeric Tores	15–21, 14–21	(silver) Runner-up
2025	Latvia International	(Estonia) Raul Käsner	(Spain) Jacobo Fernandez (Spain) Alberto Perals	10–21, 12–21	(silver) Runner-up
2026	Finnish International	(Estonia) Raul Käsner	(Sweden) Jakob Ekman (Sweden) Oscar Reuterhall	7–21, 21–17, 13–21	(silver) Runner-up

Mixed doubles
Year	Tournament	Partner	Opponent	Score	Result
2014	Riga International	(Estonia) Laura Kaljurand	(Belgium) Nick Marcoen (Belgium) Flore Vandenhoucke	21–9, 10–21, 21–12	(gold) Winner
2024	Latvia International	(Estonia) Helina Rüütel	(Republic of Ireland) Joshua Magee (Republic of Ireland) Moya Ryan	19–21, 21–16, 21–15	(gold) Winner

BWF International Challenge tournament
BWF International Series tournament
BWF Future Series tournament

== Personal life ==
Kaljurand's mother is Estonian diplomat and politician Marina Kaljurand and father is Kalle Kaljurand.
