= 2010–11 European Badminton Circuit season =

The 2010–11 European Badminton Circuit season started in May 2010 and ended in May 2011.

== Results ==
=== Winners ===
Circuit	Men's singles	Women's singles	Men's doubles	Women's doubles	Mixed doubles
Slovenian International	(Spain) Pablo Abián	(Belgium) Lianne Tan	(Netherlands) Ruud Bosch (Netherlands) Koen Ridder	(Poland) Natalia Pocztowiak (Croatia) Staša Poznanovič	(China) Mao Hong (Poland) Natalia Pocztowiak
Spanish International	(Netherlands) Eric Pang	(Germany) Juliane Schenk	(Germany) Peter Käsbauer (Germany) Oliver Roth	(Sweden) Emelie Lennartsson (Sweden) Emma Wengberg	(Republic of Ireland) Sam Magee (Republic of Ireland) Chloe Magee
St. Petersburg White Nights	(Russia) Ivan Sozonov	(Russia) Tatjana Bibik	(Poland) Adam Cwalina (Poland) Michał Łogosz	(Russia) Valeria Sorokina (Russia) Nina Vislova	(Russia) Evgenij Dremin (Russia) Anastasia Russkikh
Belgian International	(Germany) Marc Zwiebler	(Germany) Juliane Schenk	(Germany) Ingo Kindervater (Germany) Johannes Schöttler	(Germany) Sandra Marinello (Germany) Birgit Overzier	(Germany) Michael Fuchs (Germany) Birgit Overzier
Kharkiv International	(Russia) Ivan Sozonov	(Ukraine) Larissa Griga	(Poland) Adam Cwalina (Poland) Michał Łogosz	(Ukraine) Marija Ulitina (Ukraine) Natalya Voytsekh	(Ukraine) Valeriy Atrashchenkov (Ukraine) Elena Prus
Slovak International	(France) Alexandre Françoise	(Ukraine) Marija Ulitina	(Netherlands) Jacco Arends (Netherlands) Jelle Mass	(Netherlands) Selena Piek (Netherlands) Iris Tabeling	(Netherlands) Jacco Arends (Netherlands) Selena Piek
Czech International	(India) Ajay Jayaram	(Denmark) Karina Jørgensen	(England) Chris Langridge (England) Robin Middleton	(Netherlands) Selena Piek (Netherlands) Iris Tabeling	(Denmark) Anders Skaarup Rasmussen (Denmark) Anne Skelbæk
Bulgarian International	(Poland) Przemysław Wacha	(Bulgaria) Petya Nedelcheva	(England) Marcus Ellis (England) Peter Mills	(Bulgaria) Petya Nedelcheva (Russia) Anastasia Russkikh	(Russia) Evgenij Dremin (Russia) Anastasia Russkikh
Cyprus International	(Denmark) Viktor Axelsen	(Spain) Carolina Marín	(Indonesia) Didit Juang Indrianto (Indonesia) Seiko Wahyu Kusdianto	(Russia) Romina Gabdullina (Russia) Evgeniya Kosetskaya	(Denmark) Niclas Nøhr (Denmark) Lena Grebak
Hungarian International	(Finland) Ville Lång	(Germany) Karin Schnaase	(Germany) Peter Käsbauer (Germany) Josche Zurwonne	(Germany) Johanna Goliszewski (Germany) Carla Nelte	(Netherlands) Jacco Arends (Netherlands) Selena Piek
Iceland International	(Denmark) Kim Bruun	(Iceland) Ragna Ingólfsdóttir	(Denmark) Emil Holst (Denmark) Mikkel Mikkelsen	(Iceland) Katrín Atladóttir (Iceland) Ragna Ingólfsdóttir	(Denmark) Frederik Colberg (Denmark) Mette Poulsen
Norwegian International	(Denmark) Hans-Kristian Vittinghus	(Germany) Olga Konon	(Germany) Ingo Kindervater (Germany) Johannes Schöttler	(Netherlands) Lotte Jonathans (Netherlands) Paulien van Dooremalen	(Germany) Michael Fuchs (Germany) Birgit Overzier
Scottish Open	(India) Anand Pawar	(Russia) Tatjana Bibik	(England) Marcus Ellis (England) Peter Mills	(England) Jenny Wallwork (England) Gabrielle White	(England) Chris Adcock (Scotland) Imogen Bankier
Welsh International	(Spain) Pablo Abián	(Malaysia) Anita Raj Kaur	(Germany) Peter Käsbauer (Germany) Josche Zurwonne	(Malaysia) Joanne Quay (Malaysia) Anita Raj Kaur	(Germany) Peter Käsbauer (Germany) Johanna Goliszewski
Irish Open	(Denmark) Hans-Kristian Vittinghus	(Scotland) Susan Egelstaff	(England) Chris Adcock (England) Andrew Ellis	(Denmark) Maria Helsbøl (Denmark) Anne Skelbæk	(England) Chris Adcock (Scotland) Imogen Bankier
Italian International	(Poland) Przemysław Wacha	(Germany) Olga Konon	(England) Anthony Clark (England) Chris Langridge	(Netherlands) Selena Piek (Netherlands) Iris Tabeling	(England) Chris Adcock (Scotland) Imogen Bankier
Turkey International	(Poland) Przemysław Wacha	(Netherlands) Judith Meulendijks	(Russia) Vladimir Ivanov (Russia) Ivan Sozonov	(Russia) Anastasia Chervaykova (Russia) Maria Korobeynikova	(Denmark) Mads Pieler Kolding (Denmark) Julie Houmann
Estonian International	(Finland) Ville Lång	(New Zealand) Michelle Chan	(Germany) Peter Käsbauer (Germany) Josche Zurwonne	(Netherlands) Selena Piek (Netherlands) Iris Tabeling	(Netherlands) Jacco Arends (Netherlands) Selena Piek
Swedish International	(Spain) Pablo Abián	(Japan) Kaori Imabeppu	(Denmark) Kim Astrup (Denmark) Rasmus Fladberg	(Denmark) Line Damkjær Kruse (Denmark) Marie Røpke	(England) Robin Middleton (England) Heather Olver
Austrian International	(Indonesia) Andre Kurniawan Tedjono	(Indonesia) Fransisca Ratnasari	(Indonesia) Viki Indra Okvana (Indonesia) Ardiansyah Putra	(Japan) Rie Eto (Japan) Yu Wakita	(Ukraine) Valeriy Atrashchenkov (Ukraine) Elena Prus
Romanian International	(Japan) Koichi Saeki	(Japan) Minatsu Mitani	(Republic of Ireland) Sam Magee (Republic of Ireland) Tony Stephenson	(Canada) Alex Bruce (Canada) Michelle Li	(Republic of Ireland) Sam Magee (Republic of Ireland) Chloe Magee
Polish Open	(Spain) Pablo Abián	(Ukraine) Larisa Griga	(Russia) Vladimir Ivanov (Russia) Ivan Sozonov	(Japan) Rie Eto (Japan) Yu Wakita	(Poland) Robert Mateusiak (Poland) Nadieżda Zięba
Croatian International	(Germany) Dieter Domke	(Japan) Minatsu Mitani	(Denmark) Kim Astrup (Denmark) Rasmus Fladberg	(Denmark) Sandra-Maria Jensen (Denmark) Line Kjærsfeldt	(Croatia) Zvonimir Đurkinjak (Croatia) Staša Poznanović
Dutch International	(Denmark) Hans-Kristian Vittinghus	(Scotland) Susan Egelstaff	(France) Baptiste Carême (France) Sylvain Grosjean	(Russia) Valeria Sorokina (Russia) Nina Vislova	(Russia) Aleksandr Nikolaenko (Russia) Valeria Sorokina
Portugal International	(Germany) Sven-Eric Kastens	(France) Sashina Vignes Waran	(Denmark) Niclas Nøhr (Denmark) Mads Pedersen	(England) Lauren Smith (England) Alexandra Langley	(England) Robin Middleton (England) Alexandra Langley

=== Performance by countries ===
Tabulated below are the Circuit performances based on countries. Only countries who have won a title are listed:

No.	Team	SLO	ESP	RUS	BEL	UKR	SVK	CZE	BUL	CYP	HUN	ISL	NOR	SCO	WLS	IRL	ITA	TUR	EST	SWE	AUT	ROM	POL	CRO	NLD	POR	Total
1	Germany		2		5						3		3		2		1		1					1		1	19
2	Denmark							2		2		3	1			2		1		2				2	1	1	17
3	Russia			4		1			2	1				1				2					1		2		14
4	England							1	1					3		2	2			1						2	12
4	Netherlands	1	1				3	1			1		1				1	1	2								12
6	Poland	2		1		1			1								1	1					1				8
7	Japan																			1	1	2	1	1			6
7	Ukraine					3	1														1		1				6
9	Scotland													1		2	1								1		5
9	Spain	1								1					1					1			1				5
11	Indonesia									1											3						4
12	Ireland		1																			2					3
12	France						1																		1	1	3
14	Bulgaria								2																		2
14	Croatia	1																						1			2
14	Finland										1								1								2
14	Iceland											2															2
14	India							1						1													2
14	Malaysia														2												2
20	Belgium	1																									1
20	Canada																					1					1
20	China	1																									1
20	New Zealand																		1								1
20	Sweden		1																								1
