= 2008 BWF World Junior Championships – mixed doubles =

2008 BWF World Junior Championships mixed doubles
Tournament details
- Dates: 29 October 2008 – 2 November 2008
- Edition: 10th
- Level: International
- Venue: Shree Shiv Chhatrapati Sports Complex
- Location: Pune, India

The mixed doubles event for the 2008 BWF World Junior Championships was held between 29 October and 2 November. Chai Biao and Xie Jing of China won the title.

== Seeded ==
1. CHN Zhang Nan / Lu Lu (final)
2. KOR Kim Gi-jung / Eom Hye-won (semi-final)
3. KOR Kim Ki-eung / Lee Se-rang (fourth round)
4. CHN Chai Biao / Xie Jing (champion)
5. MAS Mak Hee Chun / Vivian Hoo (semi-final)
6. MAS Teo Kok Siang / Sannatasah Saniru (fourth round)
7. TPE Chou Tien-chen / Chiang Kai-hsin (fourth round)
8. KOR Choi Young-woo / Jung Kyung-eun (quarter-final)
9. TPE Lu Hsin-hao / Peng Hsiao-chu (third round)
10. NED Jacco Arends / Selena Piek (quarter-final)
11. KOR Kim Dae-eun / Choi Hye-in (quarter-final)
12. HKG Wong Wing Ki / Tse Ying Suet (fourth round)
13. FRA Sylvain Grosjean / Marion Luttmann (second round)
14. ENG Ben Stawski / Lauren Smith (fourth round)
15. THA Maneepong Jongjit / Rodjana Chuthabunditkul (fourth round)
16. JPN Naomasa Senkyo / Misaki Matsutomo (third round)

== Draw ==
=== Finals ===
Quarterfinals
1	CHN Zhang Nan; CHN Lu Lu	21	18	21
5/8	KOR Choi Young-woo; KOR Jung Kyung-eun	18	21	17
INA Muhammad Nur Roffii; INA Annisa Wahyuni	21	13	19
5/8	MAS Mak Hee Chun; MAS Vivian Hoo	19	21	21
9/16	NED Jacco Arends; NED Selena Piek	19	18
3/4	CHN Chai Biao; CHN Xie Jing	21	21
9/16	KOR Kim Dae-eun; KOR Choi Hye-in	9	15
2	KOR Kim Gi-jung; KOR Eom Hye-won	21	21

Semifinals
1	CHN Zhang Nan; CHN Lu Lu	21	21
5/8	MAS Mak Hee Chun; MAS Vivian Hoo	12	7
3/4	CHN Chai Biao; CHN Xie Jing	21	21
2	KOR Kim Gi-jung; KOR Eom Hye-won	13	19

Final
1	CHN Zhang Nan; CHN Lu Lu	19	15
3/4	CHN Chai Biao; CHN Xie Jing	21	21

=== Top half ===
==== Section 1 ====
First round
JPN H Takeuchi; JPN S Takahashi	21	21
EGY M Elsayad; EGY N Ashraf	5	7

Second round
1	CHN Zhang N CHN Lu L	21	21
SRI S Gunawardena; SRI G Perera	8	7
THA N Phuangphuapet; THA N Jindapol	11	18
THA P Poodchalat; THA R Intanon	21	21
9/16	ENG B Stawski; ENG L Smith	21	21
SCO M Campbell; SCO K McGlynn	15	12
CHN Li G CHN Zhong QX	9	19
JPN H Takeuchi; JPN S Takahashi	21	21

Third round
1	CHN Zhang N CHN Lu L	10	21	21
THA P Poodchalat; THA R Intanon	21	8	17
9/16	ENG B Stawski; ENG L Smith	22	21
JPN H Takeuchi; JPN S Takahashi	20	15

Fourth round
1	CHN Zhang N CHN Lu L	21	21
9/16	ENG B Stawski; ENG L Smith	10	10

==== Section 2 ====
First round
EST I Seidelberg; EST L Vana	13	14
IND S Praneeth; IND P Gadre	21	21
MAS Pang ZL; MAS Chong VV	21	21
EST K Kaljurand; EST G Teder	4	3

Second round
5/8	KOR Choi Y-w; KOR Jung K-e	21	21
ENG G Fox; ENG A Langley	15	7
NZL J Eunson; NZL M Chan	15	12
IND S Praneeth; IND P Gadre	21	21
9/16	JPN N Senkyo; JPN M Matsutomo	14	21	21
JPN S Hoshino; JPN S Sato	21	18	16
SIN J Wong; SIN Yao L	19	16
MAS Pang ZL; MAS Chong VV	21	21

Third round
5/8	KOR Choi Y-w; KOR Jung K-e	21	21
IND S Praneeth; IND P Gadre	18	16
9/16	JPN N Senkyo; JPN M Matsutomo	20	18
MAS Pang ZL; MAS Chong VV	22	21

Fourth round
5/8	KOR Choi Y-w; KOR Jung K-e	21	24
MAS Pang ZL; MAS Chong VV	19	22

==== Section 3 ====
First round
SRI N Wijesekera; SRI S Dahanayake	17	13
GER N Coldewe; GER F Burkert	21	21

Second round
3/4	KOR Kim K-e; KOR Lee S-r	21	21
CZE M Ludík; CZE S Křížková	10	9
NZL L Charlesworth; NZL M O'Connor	11	9
CHN Qiu ZH; CHN Xia H	21	21
9/16	TPE Lu H-h; TPE Peng H-c	21	21
CAN D Pastewka; CAN C Petersen	15	10
INA M Roffii; INA A Wahyuni	21	21
GER N Coldewe; GER F Burkert	10	14

Third round
3/4	KOR Kim K-e; KOR Lee S-r	21	21
CHN Qiu ZH; CHN Xia H	16	4
9/16	TPE Lu H-h; TPE Peng H-c	16	20
INA M Roffii; INA A Wahyuni	21	22

Fourth round
3/4	KOR Kim K-e; KOR Lee S-r	17	13
INA M Roffii; INA A Wahyuni	21	21

==== Section 4 ====
First round
EGY A Abdelrahman; EGY M El Tanany	7	9
TPE Huang P-y; TPE Cheng W-h	21	21
TUR H Oruç; TUR R Kurtuluş	21	21
RUS A Yartsev; RUS N Perminova	19	12

Second round
5/8	MAS Mak HC; MAS V Hoo	21	21
CAN P Butler; CAN M Li	12	9
GER J Geigenberger; GER C Nelte	15	18
TPE Huang P-y; TPE Cheng W-h	21	21
9/16	HKG Wong WK; HKG Tse YS	21	21
NZL A Dhoray; NZL K Gregory	13	15
BUL B Andreev; BUL B Maneva	18	21	11
TUR H Oruç; TUR R Kurtuluş	21	18	21

Third round
5/8	MAS Mak HC; MAS V Hoo	21	25
TPE Huang P-y; TPE Cheng W-h	15	23
9/16	HKG Wong WK; HKG Tse YS	21	21
TUR H Oruç; TUR R Kurtuluş	12	12

Fourth round
5/8	MAS Mak HC; MAS V Hoo	21	21
9/16	HKG Wong WK; HKG Tse YS	13	13

=== Bottom half ===
==== Section 5 ====
First round
JPN M Kido; JPN K Yonemoto	16	16
IRL S Magee; FRA A Fontaine	21	21
GER R Domke; GER M Stahlberg	21	21
SRI C Fernando; SRI S Illangakoon	10	8

Second round
IRL S Magee; FRA A Fontaine	17	11
CAN M Guiffre; CAN K Lougheed	21	21
INA M Ulinnuha; INA A Agustin	11	15
9/16	NED J Arends; NED S Piek	21	21
GER R Domke; GER M Stahlberg	21	14	21
HKG Lee CH; HKG Chan HY	18	21	17
RUS K Abramov; RUS A Chervyakova	11	12
5/8	TPE Chou T-c; TPE Chiang K-h	21	21

Third round
CAN M Guiffre; CAN K Lougheed	9	21	8
9/16	NED J Arends; NED S Piek	21	19	21
GER R Domke; GER M Stahlberg	21	16	24
5/8	TPE Chou T-C; TPE Chiang K-H	10	21	26

Fourth round
9/16	NED J Arends; NED S Piek	21	21
5/8	TPE Chou T-c; TPE Chiang K-h	18	18

==== Section 6 ====
First round
INA R Saputro; INA A Hudiono	21	21
IND P Chopra; IND P Sawant	16	17

Second round
INA R Saputro; INA A Hudiono	24	21
TPE Liao K-h; TPE Tien C-y	22	13
RUS Y Egerev; RUS R Gabdullina	19	12
9/16	THA M Jongjit; THA R Chuthabunditkul	21	21
TUR E Aslan; TUR Ö Çalışkan	21	21
MRI J Joson; MRI K F Kune	14	13
EGY M Safwat; EGY D Khairy	6	5
3/4	CHN Chai B CHN Xie J	21	21

Third round
INA R Saputro; INA A Hudiono	14	12
9/16	THA M Jongjit; THA R Chuthabunditkul	21	21
TUR E Aslan; TUR Ö Çalışkan	5	8
3/4	CHN Chai B CHN Xie J	21	21

Fourth round
9/16	THA M Jongjit; THA R Chuthabunditkul	22	12	8
5/8	CHN Chai B CHN Xie J	20	21	21

==== Section 7 ====
First round
TUR K Akcebe; TUR O Bayrak	19	16
HKG Ng KL; HKG Poon LY	21	21
SRI N Hettiarachchi; SRI A Rathnasiri	16	21	21
RUS S Scherbin; RUS A Nazarchuk	21	19	16

Second round
HKG Ng KL; HKG Poon LY	19	13
MAS Chooi KM; MAS Lai PJ	21	21
CAN T Chiu; CAN C Giuffre	2	8
9/16	KOR Kim D-e; KOR Choi H-i	21	21
SRI N Hettiarachchi; SRI A Rathnasiri	22	12
SCO P van Rietvelde; SCO G Sloan	24	21
GER A Heinz; GER L Heidenreich	WO
5/8	MAS Teo KS; MAS S Saniru

Third round
MAS Chooi KM; MAS Lai PJ	14	14
9/16	KOR Kim D-e; KOR Choi H-i	21	21
SCO P van Rietvelde; SCO G Sloan	8	21
5/8	MAS Teo KS; MAS S Saniru	21	23

Fourth round
9/16	KOR Kim D-e; KOR Choi H-i	24	18	21
5/8	MAS Teo KS; MAS S Saniru	22	21	15

==== Section 8 ====
First round
EST K Taherand; EST G Saar	17	10
TUR R Öztürk; TUR E Tunalı	21	21

Second round
TUR R Öztürk; TUR E Tunalı	23	18	21
SIN Chen GR; SIN S Neo	21	21	16
CZE M Teller; CZE P Hofmanová	21	13	21
9/16	FRA S Grosjean; FRA M Luttmann	14	21	19
ENG M Middleton; ENG A Lim	21	21
EGY A Elkhateeb; EGY N Elbanna	11	10
NZL O Leydon-Davis; NZL E Ang	11	10
2	KOR Kim G-j; KOR Eom H-w	21	21

Third round
TUR R Öztürk; TUR E Tunalı	21	21
CZE M Teller; CZE P Hofmanová	19	13
ENG M Middleton; ENG A Lim	18	9
2	KOR Kim G-j; KOR Eom H-w	21	21

Fourth round
TUR R Öztürk; TUR E Tunalı	7	16
2	KOR Kim G-j; KOR Eom H-w	21	21
