= Jessica Fletcher (badminton) =

English badminton player

Personal information
- Born: Jessica Mayne Fletcher; 6 May 1992 (age 34) Garforth, Leeds, England

Sport
- Country: England
- Sport: Badminton

Women's & mixed doubles
- Highest ranking: 67 (WD) 13 June 2013; 74 (XD) 5 September 2013
- BWF profile
Medal record
Badminton
Representing England
European Junior Championships
Bronze medal – third place	2009 Milan	Girls' doubles
Bronze medal – third place	2009 Milan	Mixed team

Jessica Mayne Fletcher (born 6 May 1992) is an English badminton player. The Garforth, Leeds born, has made good achievement in her junior career.

== Playing career ==
When she was 16, she won the girls' doubles event at the 2009 English National Championships in the Under-17s and Under-19s event. She also won the bronze medal at the European Junior Championships in the girls' doubles event. In 2011, she was the runner-up of the Turkiye Open tournament in the mixed doubles event partnered with Chris Coles.

== Achievements ==
=== European Junior Championships ===
Girls' Doubles

Year	Venue	Partner	Opponent	Score	Result
2009	Federal Technical Centre - Palabadminton, Milan, Italy	(England) Sarah Milne	(Russia) Anastasia Chervyakova (Russia) Romina Gabdullina	16–21, 21–15, 16–21	Bronze

=== BWF International Challenge/Series (1 runner-up) ===
Mixed Doubles

Year	Tournament	Partner	Opponent	Score	Result
2011	Turkiye Open	(England) Chris Coles	(England) Ben Stawski (England) Lauren Smith	19–21, 13–21	(silver) Runner-up

BWF International Challenge tournament
BWF International Series tournament
