= 2008 BWF World Junior Championships – boys' doubles =

2008 BWF World Junior Championships boys' doubles
Tournament details
- Dates: 29 October 2008 – 2 November 2008
- Edition: 10th
- Level: International
- Venue: Shree Shiv Chhatrapati Sports Complex
- Location: Pune, India

The boys' doubles event for the 2008 BWF World Junior Championships was held between 29 October and 2 November. Mak Hee Chun and Teo Kok Siang of Malaysia won the title.

== Seeded ==
1. MAS Mak Hee Chun / Teo Kok Siang (champion)
2. KOR Choi Young-woo / Kim Gi-jung (third round)
3. KOR Kim Dae-eun / Kim Ki-eung (semi-final)
4. CHN Chai Biao / Qiu Zihan (final)
5. CHN Li Gen / Zhang Nan (quarter-final)
6. NED Jacco Arends / Jelle Maas (third round)
7. FRA Sylvain Grosjean / IRL Sam Magee (second round)
8. SCO Martin Campbell / Angus Gilmour (third round)

== Draw ==
=== Finals ===
Semifinals
1	MAS Mak Hee Chun; MAS Teo Kok Siang	21	21
3/4	KOR Kim Dae-eun; KOR Kim Ki-eung	14	13
3/4	CHN Chai Biao; CHN Qiu Zihan	21	21
MAS Chooi Kah Ming; MAS Pang Zheng Lin	8	16

Final
1	MAS Mak Hee Chun; MAS Teo Kok Siang	21	21
3/4	CHN Chai Biao; CHN Qiu Zihan	18	14

==== Section 1 ====
First round
IND S Praneeth; IND P Chopra	21	21
RUS S Scherbin; RUS A Yartsev	10	12
JPN S Hoshino; JPN N Senkyo
SYR M Al Jonid; SYR A Awad	WO
INA R Saputro; INA Y Sugiarto	21	21
ITA G Greco; ITA P Musiari	14	12
TUR K Akcebe; TUR R Öztürk	9	19
SIN Chen GR; SIN J Wong	21	21
EGY A Abdelrahman; EGY A El Khateeb	21	21
IRI S Eivani; IRI M Khanjani	19	15

Second round
1	MAS Mak HC; MAS Teo KS	21	21
GER J Geigenberger; GER A Heinz	9	10
IND S Praneeth; IND P Chopra	15	21	17
JPN S Hoshino; JPN N Senkyo	21	17	21
5/8	FRA S Grosjean; IRL S Magee	19	13
INA R Saputro; INA Y Sugiarto	21	21
SIN Chen GR; SIN J Wong	21	21
EGY A Abdelrahman; EGY A El Khateeb	15	12

Third round
1	MAS Mak HC; MAS Teo KS	21	18	21
JPN S Hoshino; JPN N Senkyo	13	21	13
INA R Saputro; INA Y Sugiarto	21	21
SIN Chen GR; SIN J Wong	13	15

Quarterfinal
1	MAS Mak HC; MAS Teo KS	19	21	21
INA R Saputro; INA Y Sugiarto	21	13	14

==== Section 2 ====
First round
TPE Huang P-y; TPE Lu H-h	21	21
JAM G Henry; JAM C Parsons	7	8
SRI C Fernando; SRI D Kariyawasam	21	21
AFG G Abed; AFG Y Massaud	10	8
ENG G Fox; ENG R Morris	7^{r}
SCO C Pollock; SCO P van Rietvelde	10
CZE M Ludík; CZE M Teller	21	14
NZL A Dhoray; NZL O Leydon-Davis	23	21
PAK T Arab; PAK A Zahid	18	21
CAN M Guiffre; CAN D Pastewka	21	23
THA S Saetung; THA S Wongyaporm	21	21
FRA M Michel; FRA T Rouxel	19	17

Second round
3/4	KOR Kim D-e; KOR Kim K-e	21	21
TPE Huang P-y; TPE Lu H-h	14	13
SRI C Fernando; SRI D Kariyawasam	7	12
SCO C Pollock; SCO P van Rietvelde	21	21
5/8	CHN Li G CHN Zhang N	23	3
NZL A Dhoray; NZL O Leydon-Davis	21	4^{r}
CAN M Guiffre; CAN D Pastewka	9	9
THA S Saetung; THA S Wongyaporm	21	21

Third round
3/4	KOR Kim D-e; KOR Kim K-e	21	21
SCO C Pollock; SCO P van Rietvelde	15	12
5/8	CHN Li G CHN Zhang N	21	21
THA S Saetung; THA S Wongyaporm	17	18

Quarterfinal
3/4	KOR Kim D-e; KOR Kim K-e	14	21	21
5/8	CHN Li G CHN Zhang N	21	19	11

==== Section 3 ====
First round
AFG R Shekib; AFG K Kabir	6	4
THA B Isara; THA M Jongjit	21	21
ENG M Middleton; ENG B Stawski	21	21
TUR E Arslan; TUR H Oruç	18	12
MRI A Alleck; MRI J Joson	15	19
SRI N Hettiarachchi; SRI N Wijesekera	21	21
TPE Liao C-c; TPE Liao K-h	21	21
IRQ M Saad; IRQ M Neamah	5	9
BAN L Chand; BAN S Sazzad	10	21	21
NEP P Rajendra; NEP T Sajan	21	16	13
JPN R Sato; JPN S Wada	21	21
PAK M Bhatti; PAK A Khan	9	11

Second round
THA B Isara; THA M Jongjit	21	21
ENG M Middleton; ENG B Stawski	15	14
SRI N Hettiarachchi; SRI N Wijesekera	13	14
5/8	NED J Arends; NED J Maas	21	21
TPE Liao C-c; TPE Liao K-h	21	21
BAN L Chand; BAN S Sazzad	4	11
JPN R Sato; JPN S Wada	19	15
3/4	CHN Chai B CHN Qiu ZH	21	21

Third round
THA B Isara; THA M Jongjit	21	21
5/8	NED J Arends; NED J Maas	17	6
TPE Liao C-c; TPE Liao K-h	13	17
3/4	CHN Chai B CHN Qiu ZH	21	21

Quarterfinal
THA B Isara; THA M Jongjit	19	22	19
3/4	CHN Chai B CHN Qiu ZH	21	20	21

==== Section 4 ====
First round
MAS Chooi KM; MAS Pang ZL	21	21
EST K Kaljurand; EST K Taherand	10	15
GER N Coldewe; GER R Domke	15	21	21
NZL J Eunson; NZL E Haggo	21	13	18
SIN E Sng; SIN Tang KS	13	15
CAN P Butler; CAN G Prieur	21	21
EGY M El Sayad; EGY M Safwat	8	17
DEN E Holst; DEN S Rasmussen	21	21
HKG Lee CH; HKG Ng KL	19	22	21
IND P Patel; IND A Prakash	21	20	15
INA K Alexander; INA A Pratama	22	21
RUS K Abramov; RUS Y Egerev	20	11

Second round
MAS Chooi KM; MAS Pang ZL	21	20	21
GER N Coldewe; GER R Domke	14	22	15
CAN P Butler; CAN G Prieur	8	13
5/8	SCO M Campbell; SCO A Gilmour	21	21
DEN E Holst; DEN S Rasmussen	21	21
HKG Lee CH; HKG Ng KL	9	12
INA K Alexander; INA A Pratama	21	14	13
2	KOR Choi Y-w; KOR Kim G-j	19	21	21

Third round
MAS Chooi KM; MAS Pang ZL	19	21	21
5/8	SCO M Campbell; SCO A Gilmour	21	15	17
DEN E Holst; DEN S Rasmussen	22	9	21
2	KOR Choi Y-w; KOR Kim G-j	20	21	18

Quarterfinal
MAS Chooi KM; MAS Pang ZL	21	21
DEN E Holst; DEN S Rasmussen	15	8
