= Kim Dae-eun =

Kim Dae-eun may refer to:

- Kim Dae-eun (gymnast)
- Kim Dae-eun (badminton)
