= Sara Thygesen =

Danish badminton player (born 1991)

Personal information
- Born: 20 January 1991 (age 35) Fredericia, Denmark
- Years active: 2008–present
- Height: 1.72 m (5 ft 8 in)

Sport
- Country: Denmark
- Sport: Badminton
- Handedness: Right

Women's & mixed doubles
- Highest ranking: 14 (WD with Maiken Fruergaard 15 January 2019); 15 (XD with Mathias Christiansen 12 October 2017)
- Current ranking: 34 (WD with Maiken Fruergaard 25 March 2025)
- BWF profile
Medal record
Women's badminton
Representing Denmark
European Games
Gold medal – first place	2015 Baku	Mixed doubles
European Championships
Silver medal – second place	2016 La Roche-sur-Yon	Mixed doubles
Bronze medal – third place	2016 La Roche-sur-Yon	Women's doubles
Bronze medal – third place	2018 Huelva	Women's doubles
Bronze medal – third place	2021 Kyiv	Women's doubles
Bronze medal – third place	2022 Madrid	Women's doubles
Bronze medal – third place	2025 Horsens	Women's doubles
European Mixed Team Championships
Gold medal – first place	2015 Leuven	Mixed team
Gold medal – first place	2017 Lubin	Mixed team
Gold medal – first place	2023 Aire-sur-la-Lys	Mixed team
European Women's Team Championships
Gold medal – first place	2014 Basel	Women's team
Gold medal – first place	2016 Kazan	Women's team
Gold medal – first place	2018 Kazan	Women's team
Gold medal – first place	2020 Liévin	Women's team
Gold medal – first place	2024 Łódź	Women's team
European Junior Championships
Gold medal – first place	2009 Milan	Mixed team
Bronze medal – third place	2009 Milan	Mixed doubles

Sara Thygesen (born 20 January 1991) is a Danish badminton player, specializing in doubles. She started playing badminton at Gårslev in 2002. She got an award for the best female athlete of the year 2007 in her hometown Fredericia. In 2014, she joined the Denmark national badminton team, then in 2015, she won a gold medal at the European Games with her partner in the mixed doubles Niclas Nøhr.

== Career ==
Thygesen competed at the 2020 Tokyo Olympics partnering Maiken Fruergaard. Her pace at the Games was stopped in the group stage after placing 4th in the group C standings. Thygesen and Fruergaard also at the 2024 Paris Olympics.

== Achievements ==
=== European Games ===
Mixed doubles
Year	Venue	Partner	Opponent	Score	Result
2015	Baku Sports Hall; Baku, Azerbaijan	(Denmark) Niclas Nøhr	(France) Gaëtan Mittelheisser (France) Audrey Fontaine	21–16, 21–16	Gold

=== European Championships ===
Women's doubles
Year	Venue	Partner	Opponent	Score	Result
2016	Vendéspace, La Roche-sur-Yon, France	(Denmark) Maiken Fruergaard	(Netherlands) Eefje Muskens (Netherlands) Selena Piek	17–21, 17–21	Bronze
2018	Palacio de los Deportes Carolina Marín, Huelva, Spain	(Denmark) Maiken Fruergaard	(Bulgaria) Gabriela Stoeva (Bulgaria) Stefani Stoeva	10–21, 18–21	Bronze
2021	Palace of Sports, Kyiv, Ukraine	(Denmark) Maiken Fruergaard	(Bulgaria) Gabriela Stoeva (Bulgaria) Stefani Stoeva	16–21, 10–21	Bronze
2022	Polideportivo Municipal Gallur, Madrid, Spain	(Denmark) Maiken Fruergaard	(Germany) Linda Efler (Germany) Isabel Lohau	22–20, 15–21, 20–22	Bronze
2025	Forum, Horsens, Denmark	(Netherlands) Debora Jille	(Bulgaria) Gabriela Stoeva (Bulgaria) Stefani Stoeva	14–21, 10–21	Bronze

Mixed doubles
Year	Venue	Partner	Opponent	Score	Result
2016	Vendéspace, La Roche-sur-Yon, France	(Denmark) Niclas Nøhr	(Denmark) Joachim Fischer Nielsen (Denmark) Christinna Pedersen	21–19, 13–21, 17–21	Silver

=== European Junior Championships ===
Mixed doubles
Year	Venue	Partner	Opponent	Score	Result
2009	Federal Technical Centre - Palabadminton; Milan, Italy	(Denmark) Morten Bodskov	(Germany) Jonas Geigenberger (Germany) Fabienne Deprez	19–21, 15–21	Bronze

=== BWF World Tour (2 titles, 3 runners-up) ===
The BWF World Tour, which was announced on 19 March 2017 and implemented in 2018, is a series of elite badminton tournaments sanctioned by the Badminton World Federation (BWF). The BWF World Tour is divided into levels of World Tour Finals, Super 1000, Super 750, Super 500, Super 300, and the BWF Tour Super 100.

Women's doubles
Year	Tournament	Level	Partner	Opponent	Score	Result
2020	Indonesia Masters	Super 500	(Denmark) Maiken Fruergaard	(Indonesia) Greysia Polii (Indonesia) Apriyani Rahayu	21–18, 11–21, 21–23	(silver) Runner-up
2023	U.S. Open	Super 300	(Denmark) Maiken Fruergaard	(China) Liu Shengshu (China) Tan Ning	19–21, 19–21	(silver) Runner-up

Mixed doubles
Year	Tournament	Level	Partner	Opponent	Score	Result
2018	German Open	Super 300	(Denmark) Niclas Nøhr	(Malaysia) Goh Soon Huat (Malaysia) Shevon Jemie Lai	14–21, 20–22	(silver) Runner-up
2018	Orléans Masters	Super 100	(Denmark) Niclas Nøhr	(Germany) Peter Käsbauer (Germany) Olga Konon	21–19, 21–9	(gold) Winner
2018	Spain Masters	Super 300	(Denmark) Niclas Nøhr	(England) Marcus Ellis (England) Lauren Smith	21–19, 21–17	(gold) Winner

=== BWF Grand Prix (1 title, 1 runner-up) ===
The BWF Grand Prix had two levels, the Grand Prix and Grand Prix Gold. It was a series of badminton tournaments sanctioned by the Badminton World Federation (BWF) and played between 2007 and 2017.

Mixed doubles
Year	Tournament	Partner	Opponent	Score	Result
2014	Scottish Open	(Denmark) Niclas Nøhr	(Scotland) Robert Blair (Scotland) Imogen Bankier	18–21, 14–21	(silver) Runner-up
2016	Dutch Open	(Denmark) Mathias Christiansen	(Denmark) Søren Gravholt (Denmark) Maiken Fruergaard	21–18, 20–22, 21–16	(gold) Winner

BWF Grand Prix Gold tournament
BWF Grand Prix tournament

=== BWF International Challenge/Series (9 titles, 6 runners-up) ===
Women's doubles
Year	Tournament	Partner	Opponent	Score	Result
2013	Spanish International	(Denmark) Maiken Fruergaard	(England) Heather Olver (England) Kate Robertshaw	21–18, 13–21, 20–22	(silver) RUnner-up
2014	Dutch International	(Denmark) Maiken Fruergaard	(Netherlands) Samantha Barning (Netherlands) Iris Tabeling	16–21, 12–21	(silver) RUnner-up
2015	Belgian International	(Denmark) Maiken Fruergaard	(Malaysia) Joyce Choong Wai Chi (Malaysia) Yap Cheng Wen	21–18, 21–11	(gold) Winner
2016	Swedish Masters	(Denmark) Maiken Fruergaard	(Netherlands) Samantha Barning (Netherlands) Iris Tabeling	21–19, 21–17	(gold) Winner
2023	Irish Open	(Denmark) Maiken Fruergaard	(Bulgaria) Gabriela Stoeva (Bulgaria) Stefani Stoeva	21–19, 17–21, 24–22	(gold) Winner
2024	Scottish Open	(Netherlands) Debora Jille	(England) Chloe Birch (England) Estelle van Leeuwen	21–14, 10–21, 21–8	(gold) Winner

Mixed doubles
Year	Tournament	Partner	Opponent	Score	Result
2009	Turkey International	(Denmark) Tore Vilhelmsen	(Indonesia) Viki Indra Okvana (Indonesia) Gustiani Megawati	11–21, 18–21	(silver) Runner-up
2013	Croatian International	(Denmark) Frederik Colberg	(Denmark) Niclas Nøhr (Denmark) Rikke Søby Hansen	21–12, 12–21, 9–21	(silver) RUnner-up
2014	Orléans International	(Denmark) Niclas Nøhr	(Scotland) Robert Blair (Scotland) Imogen Bankier	13–21, 21–19, 18–21	(silver) Runner-up
2014	Croatian International	(Denmark) Niclas Nøhr	(Denmark) Mads Pedersen (Denmark) Mai Surrow	21–15, 13–21, 21–18	(gold) Winner
2014	Dutch International	(Denmark) Niclas Nøhr	(Netherlands) Robin Tabeling (Netherlands) Myke Halkema	21–10, 21–5	(gold) Winner
2014	Irish Open	(Denmark) Niclas Nøhr	(Germany) Peter Käsbauer (Germany) Isabel Herttrich	21–10, 21–18	(gold) Winner
2015	Italian International	(Denmark) Niclas Nøhr	(England) Matthew Nottingham (England) Emily Westwood	21–10, 17–21, 21–19	(gold) Winner
2016	Finnish International	(Denmark) Niclas Nøhr	(Denmark) Mathias Christiansen (Denmark) Lena Grebak	21–18, 21–23, 16–21	(silver) Runner-up
2016	Irish Open	(Denmark) Mathias Christiansen	(Netherlands) Robin Tabeling (Netherlands) Cheryl Seinen	21–16, 21–16	(gold) Winner

BWF International Challenge tournament
BWF International Series tournament
