= 2009 European Junior Badminton Championships =

Tournament details
- Dates: 3 – 15 April 2009
- Venue: Federal Technical Centre - Palabadminton
- Location: Milan, Lombardy, Italy

The 2009 European Junior Badminton Championships were held in Federal Technical Centre - Palabadminton, Milan, Italy, between April 3 and April 15, 2009.

== Medalists ==
Event	Gold	Silver	Bronze
Men's singles	(Denmark) Emil Holst	(Wales) Jamie van Hooijdonk	(Finland) Kasper Lehikoinen
Men's singles	(Denmark) Emil Holst	(Wales) Jamie van Hooijdonk	(Denmark) Steffen Rasmussen
Women's singles	(Denmark) Anne Hald Jensen	(Spain) Carolina Marín	(Russia) Natalia Perminova
Women's singles	(Denmark) Anne Hald Jensen	(Spain) Carolina Marín	(Belgium) Lianne Tan
Men's doubles	(France) Sylvain Grosjean and (Republic of Ireland) Sam Magee	(Denmark) Emil Holst and Mads Pedersen	(Denmark) Niclas Nøhr and Steffen Rasmussen
Men's doubles	(France) Sylvain Grosjean and (Republic of Ireland) Sam Magee	(Denmark) Emil Holst and Mads Pedersen	(Germany) Jonas Geigenberger and Andreas Heinz
Women's doubles	(Russia) Anastasia Chervyakova and Romina Gabdullina	(Netherlands) Selena Piek and Iris Tabeling	(Russia) Elena Komendrovskaja and Ksenia Polikarpova
Women's doubles	(Russia) Anastasia Chervyakova and Romina Gabdullina	(Netherlands) Selena Piek and Iris Tabeling	(England) Jessica Fletcher and Sarah Milne
Mixed doubles	(Netherlands) Jacco Arends and Selena Piek	(Germany) Jonas Geigenberger and Fabienne Deprez	(Denmark) Morten Bodskov and Sara Thygesen
Mixed doubles	(Netherlands) Jacco Arends and Selena Piek	(Germany) Jonas Geigenberger and Fabienne Deprez	(England) Ben Stawski and Lauren Smith
Teams	Denmark; Morten Bodskov; Søren Gravholt; Emil Holst; Niclas Nøhr; Mads Pedersen; Steffen Rasmussen; Lene Clausen; Lena Grebak; Anne Hald Jensen; Amanda Mathiassen; Anne Skelbæk; Sara Thygesen	Netherlands; Jacco Arends; Nick Fransman; Jordy Hilbink; Jelle Maas; Erik Meijs; Hans van Os; Thamar Peters; Selena Piek; Iris Tabeling; Soraya de Visch Eijbergen; Josephine Wentholt; Yik-Man Wong	England; Chris Coles; Gary Fox; Daniel Groom; Mark Middleton; Richard Morris; Ben Stawski; Jessica Fletcher; Alyssa Lim; Sarah Milne; Panuga Riou; Kate Robertshaw; Lauren Smith
Teams	Denmark; Morten Bodskov; Søren Gravholt; Emil Holst; Niclas Nøhr; Mads Pedersen; Steffen Rasmussen; Lene Clausen; Lena Grebak; Anne Hald Jensen; Amanda Mathiassen; Anne Skelbæk; Sara Thygesen	Netherlands; Jacco Arends; Nick Fransman; Jordy Hilbink; Jelle Maas; Erik Meijs; Hans van Os; Thamar Peters; Selena Piek; Iris Tabeling; Soraya de Visch Eijbergen; Josephine Wentholt; Yik-Man Wong	Germany; Florian Berchtenbreiter; Maximilian Bobeth; Richard Domke; Jonas Geigenberger; Andreas Heinz; Fabian Holzer; Nikolaj Persson; Max Schwenger; Tobias Wadenka; Franziska Burkert; Fabienne Deprez; Alina Hammes; Lisa Heidenreich; Isabel Herttrich; Carla Nelte; Mette Stahlberg; Inken Wienefeld

== Medal table ==
* Host nation (Italy)

Rank	Nation	Gold	Silver	Bronze	Total
1	Denmark	3	1	3	7
2	Netherlands	1	2	0	3
3	Russia	1	0	2	3
4	France	0.5	0	0	0.5
4	Ireland	0.5	0	0	0.5
6	Germany	0	1	2	3
7	Spain	0	1	0	1
7	Wales	0	1	0	1
9	England	0	0	3	3
10	Belgium	0	0	1	1
10	Finland	0	0	1	1
Totals (11 entries)		6	6	12	24
