= Käsbauer =

Käsbauer is a German surname. Notable people with the surname include:

- Peter Käsbauer (born 1988), German badminton player
