= Steffen Rasmussen (badminton) =

Danish badminton player

Personal information
- Born: 15 April 1991 (age 35)

Sport
- Country: Denmark
- Sport: Badminton

Men's singles
- Highest ranking: 85 (20 August 2015)
- BWF profile
Medal record
Men's badminton
Representing Denmark
European Junior Championships
| Gold medal – first place | 2009 Milan | Mixed team |
| Bronze medal – third place | 2009 Milan | Boys' singles |
| Bronze medal – third place | 2009 Milan | Boys' doubles |

Steffen Rasmussen (born 15 April 1991) is a Danish badminton player. In 2009, he won the boys' singles and doubles bronze medals at the European Junior Championships. In 2015, he won the men's singles title at the Finnish International tournament.

== Achievements ==
=== European Junior Championships ===
Boys' singles

| Year | Venue | Opponent | Score | Result |
|---|---|---|---|---|
| 2009 | Federal Technical Centre - Palabadminton, Milan, Italy | (Wales) Jamie van Hooijdonk | 19–21, 21–19, 18–21 | Bronze |

Boys' doubles

| Year | Venue | Partner | Opponent | Score | Result |
|---|---|---|---|---|---|
| 2009 | Federal Technical Centre - Palabadminton, Milan, Italy | (Denmark) Niclas Nøhr | (France) Sylvain Grosjean (Republic of Ireland) Sam Magee | 23–25, 17–21 | Bronze |

=== BWF International Challenge/Series ===
Men's singles

| Year | Tournament | Opponent | Score | Result |
|---|---|---|---|---|
| 2015 | Finnish International | (Denmark) Kasper Dinesen | 21–14, 21–17 | (gold) Winner |

BWF International Challenge tournament
BWF International Series tournament
