= Kim Dae-eun (badminton) =

South Korean badminton player (born 1990)

Personal information
- Born: 1 October 1990 (age 36)
- Height: 1.78 m (5 ft 10 in)
- Weight: 76 kg (168 lb)

Sport
- Country: South Korea
- Sport: Badminton

Men's & mixed doubles
- Highest ranking: 70 (MD 19 September 2013); 72 (XD 12 December 2013)
- BWF profile
Medal record
Men's badminton
Representing South Korea
World Junior Championships
Silver medal – second place	2008 Pune	Mixed team
Bronze medal – third place	2008 Pune	Boys' doubles
Asian Junior Championships
Silver medal – second place	2008 Kuala Lumpur	Mixed team

- Kim Dae-eun
- Hangul: 김대은
- Hanja: 金大恩
- RR: Gim Daeeun
- MR: Kim Taeŭn

Kim Dae-eun (Korean: 김대은; born 1 October 1990) is a South Korean badminton player who affiliated with Yonex team since 2013. He graduated from Wonkwang University.

== Achievements ==
=== BWF World Junior Championships ===
Boys' doubles
Year	Venue	Partner	Opponent	Score	Result
2008	Shree Shiv Chhatrapati Badminton Hall; Pune, India	(South Korea) Kim Ki-eung	(Malaysia) Mak Hee Chun (Malaysia) Teo Kok Siang	14–21, 13–21	Bronze

=== BWF International Challenge/Series ===
Men's doubles
Year	Tournament	Partner	Opponent	Score	Result
2012	India International	(South Korea) Cho Gun-woo	(South Korea) Ko Sung-hyun (South Korea) Lee Yong-dae	11–21, 10–21	(silver) Runner-up
2015	Indonesia International	(South Korea) Chan Jun-bong	(Indonesia) Berry Angriawan (Indonesia) Rian Agung Saputro	21–12, 19–21, 15–21	(silver) Runner-up

BWF International Challenge tournament
BWF International Series tournament
BWF Future Series tournament
