= Melih Turgut =

Turkish badminton player (born 1997)

Personal information
- Born: 9 July 1997 (age 29) Altındağ, Ankara, Turkey
- Height: 1.73 m (5 ft 8 in)
- Weight: 68 kg (150 lb)

Sport
- Country: Turkey
- Sport: Badminton

Men's singles & doubles
- Highest ranking: 566 (MS 27 August 2015); 645 (MD 20 October 2016); 132 (XD 3 September 2015)
- BWF profile

Melih Turgut (born 9 July 1997) is a Turkish badminton player. He competed at the 2015 Baku European Games.

== Achievements ==
=== BWF International Challenge/Series ===
Mixed doubles
Year	Tournament	Partner	Opponent	Score	Result
2014	Morocco International	(Turkey) Fatma Nur Yavuz	(Jordan) Bahaedeen Ahmad Alshannik (Jordan) Domou Amro	10–11, 11–8, 11–9, 11–2	(gold) Winner
2015	Turkey International	(Turkey) Fatma Nur Yavuz	(Turkey) Serdar Koca (Turkey) Emine Demirtaş	21–14, 20–22, 21–11	(gold) Winner
2016	Bulgarian International	(Turkey) Fatma Nur Yavuz	(England) Ben Stawski (Bulgaria) Lubomira Stoynova	21–13, 21–16	(gold) Winner
2016	Turkey International	(Turkey) Fatma Nur Yavuz	(Russia) Rodion Alimov (Russia) Alina Davletova	21–19, 21–14	(gold) Winner

BWF International Challenge tournament
BWF International Series tournament
BWF Future Series tournament
