= 2008 BWF World Junior Championships =

Tournament details
- Dates: October 29, 2008 - November 2, 2008
- Edition: 10th
- Level: International
- Venue: Shree Shiv Chhatrapati Sports Complex
- Location: Pune, India

The 2008 BWF World Junior Championships took place in Pune, India, from 29 October to 2 November 2008.

== Medalists ==
Event	Gold	Silver	Bronze
Teams	China; Chai Biao; Gan Zhaolong; Gao Huan; Li Gen; Qiu Zihan; Wang Zhengming; Zhang Nan; Zhang Sheng; Chen Xiaojia; Li Xuerui; Lin Shen; Lu Lu; Wang Shixian; Xia Huan; Xie Jing; Zhong Qianxin	South Korea; Choi Seung-il; Choi Young-woo; Kang Ji-wook; Kim Dae-eun; Kim Gi-jung; Kim Ki-eung; Lee Dong-keun; Park Sung-min; Bae Youn-joo; Choi Hye-in; Eom Hye-won; Jung Kyung-eun; Lee Joo-hee; Lee Se-rang; Sung Ji-hyun; Yang Ran-sun	Malaysia; Muhammad Syawal Mohd Ismail; Iskandar Zulkarnain Zainuddin; Chooi Kah Ming; Goh Soon Huat; Kuan Kam Chung; Mak Hee Chun; Pang Zheng Lin; Teo Kok Siang; Sannatasah Saniru; Tiffany Chase Currier; Chong Vee Vian; Vivian Hoo Kah Mun; Lai Pei Jing; Florah Ng Siew Fong; Ng Sin Er; Tee Jing Yi
Boys' singles	(China) Wang Zhengming	(China) Gao Huan	(India) Gurusai Dutt
Boys' singles	(China) Wang Zhengming	(China) Gao Huan	(South Korea) Lee Dong-Keun
Girls' singles	(India) Saina Nehwal	(Japan) Sayaka Sato	(China) Wang Shixian
Girls' singles	(India) Saina Nehwal	(Japan) Sayaka Sato	(Thailand) Porntip Buranaprasertsuk
Boys doubles	(Malaysia) Mak Hee Chun (Malaysia) Teo Kok Siang	(China) Chai Biao (China) Qiu Zihan	(South Korea) Kim Dae-eun (South Korea) Kim Ki-eung
Boys doubles	(Malaysia) Mak Hee Chun (Malaysia) Teo Kok Siang	(China) Chai Biao (China) Qiu Zihan	(Malaysia) Chooi Kah Ming (Malaysia) Pang Zheng Lin
Girls doubles	(Singapore) Fu Mingtian (Singapore) Yao Lei	(China) Xie Jing (China) Zhong Qianxin	(China) Lu Lu (China) Xia Huan
Girls doubles	(Singapore) Fu Mingtian (Singapore) Yao Lei	(China) Xie Jing (China) Zhong Qianxin	(Indonesia) Anneke Feinya Agustin (Indonesia) Annisa Wahyuni
Mixed doubles	(China) Chai Biao (China) Xie Jing	(China) Zhang Nan (China) Lu Lu	(South Korea) Kim Ki-jung (South Korea) Eom Hye-won
Mixed doubles	(China) Chai Biao (China) Xie Jing	(China) Zhang Nan (China) Lu Lu	(Malaysia) Mak Hee Chun (Malaysia) Vivian Hoo Kah Mun

== Team competition ==
A total of 21 countries competed at the team competition in 2008 BWF World Junior Championships.

=== Final positions ===
1. China
2. South Korea
3. Malaysia
4. India
5. Thailand
6. Japan
7. Indonesia
8. Hong Kong
9. Chinese Taipei
10. Canada
11. Singapore
12. France
13. England
14. Russia
15. New Zealand
16. Germany
17. Scotland
18. Sri Lanka (Debut)
19. Turkey
20. Czech Republic
21. Estonia (Debut)

=== Results ===
==== Final round ====
China
3
Pune, India

South Korea
1

			1	2	3
1	(China) (South Korea)	Zhang Nan / Lu Lu; Kim Gi-jung / Eom Hye-won	21; 15	15; 21	14; 21
2	(China) (South Korea)	Gao Huan; Lee Dong-keun	21; 14	21; 15
3	(China) (South Korea)	Chai Biao / Qiu Zihan; Kim Gi-jung / Choi Young-woo	17; 21	21; 19	22; 20
4	(China) (South Korea)	Li Xuerui; Sung Ji-hyun	21; 13	21; 14
5	(China) (South Korea)	Lu Lu / Xia Huan; Jung Kyung-eun / Eom Hye-won				not played

== Medal table ==
Rank	Nation	Gold	Silver	Bronze	Total
1	China (CHN)	3	4	2	9
2	Malaysia (MAS)	1	0	3	4
3	India (IND)	1	0	1	2
4	Singapore (SIN)	1	0	0	1
5	South Korea (KOR)	0	1	3	4
6	Japan (JPN)	0	1	0	1
7	Indonesia (INA)	0	0	1	1
7	Thailand (THA)	0	0	1	1
Totals (8 entries)		6	6	11	23
