= Chris Coles =

English badminton player (born 1992)

Personal information
- Nickname: Chris
- Born: Christopher Coles; 14 July 1992 (age 34) Bristol, England
- Height: 1.88 m (6 ft 2 in)

Sport
- Country: England
- Sport: Badminton
- Handedness: Right
- Coached by: Jakob Hoi; Peter Jeffrey; Julian Robertson

Men's & mixed doubles
- Highest ranking: 39 (MD) 17 April 2014; 57 (XD) 9 October 2014
- BWF profile
Medal record
Men's badminton
Representing England
European Men's Team Championships
Silver medal – second place	2014 Basel	Men's team
European Junior Championships
Gold medal – first place	2011 Vantaa	Boys' doubles
Bronze medal – third place	2009 Milan	Mixed team

Christopher Coles (born 14 July 1992) is a badminton player from England. He started playing badminton at age 6. He did a BTEC at Chippenham College, after year 11. In 2011, he won the gold medal at the European Junior Championships in the boys' doubles event with Matthew Nottingham.

== Achievements ==
=== European Junior Championships ===
Boys' doubles
Year	Venue	Partner	Opponent	Score	Result
2011	Energia Areena, Vantaa, Finland	(England) Matthew Nottingham	(Germany) Fabian Holzer (Germany) Max Schwenger	15–21, 21–14, 21–15	Gold

=== BWF International Challenge/Series (5 titles, 5 runners-up) ===
Men's doubles

Year	Tournament	Opponent	Partner	Score	Result
2011	Welsh International	(England) Matthew Nottingham	(Scotland) Martin Campbell (Scotland) Angus Gilmour	21–19, 21–7	(gold) Winner
2012	Swiss International	(England) Matthew Nottingham	(Poland) Adam Cwalina (Poland) Przemysław Wacha	21–23, 14–21	(silver) Runner-up
2013	Dutch International	(England) Matthew Nottingham	(Poland) Łukasz Moreń (Poland) Wojciech Szkudlarczyk	13–21, 21–18, 9–21	(silver) Runner-up
2013	Slovenia International	(England) Matthew Nottingham	(Russia) Nikita Khakimov (Russia) Vasily Kuznetsov	19–21, 16–21	(silver) Runner-up
2013	Welsh International	(England) Matthew Nottingham	(Australia) Robin Middleton (Australia) Ross Smith	21–17, 21–15	(gold) Winner
2016	Iceland International	(Scotland) Adam Hall	(England) Ben Lane (England) Sean Vendy	21–19, 21–19	(gold) Winner
2016	Polish International	(England) Gregory Mairs	(Chinese Taipei) Lu Ching-yao (Chinese Taipei) Yang Po-han	16–21, 9–21	(silver) Runner-up

Mixed doubles

Year	Tournament	Opponent	Partner	Score	Result
2011	Turkiye Open	(England) Jessica Fletcher	(England) Ben Stawski (England) Lauren Smith	19–21, 13–21	(silver) Runner-up
2014	Welsh International	(England) Sophie Brown	(Germany) Max Weißkirchen (Germany) Eva Janssens	18–21, 21–16, 21–14	(gold) Winner
2015	Hungarian International	(England) Victoria Williams	(Denmark) Patrick Buhl (Denmark) Isabella Nielsen	21–19, 11–21, 21–17	(gold) Winner

BWF International Challenge tournament
BWF International Series tournament
BWF Future Series tournament
