= Niclas Nøhr =

Danish badminton player (born 1991)

Personal information
- Born: 2 August 1991 (age 35) Møn, Denmark
- Years active: 2010–2022
- Height: 1.85 m (6 ft 1 in)

Sport
- Country: Denmark
- Sport: Badminton
- Handedness: Left
- Retired: 19 April 2022

Men's & mixed doubles
- Highest ranking: 32 (MD with Kasper Antonsen 22 September 2016); 16 (XD with Sara Thygesen 13 September 2018)
- BWF profile
Medal record
Men's badminton
Representing Denmark
European Games
Gold medal – first place	2015 Baku	Mixed doubles
European Championships
Silver medal – second place	2016 La Roche-sur-Yon	Mixed doubles
European Mixed Team Championships
Gold medal – first place	2019 Copenhagen	Mixed team
Gold medal – first place	2021 Vantaa	Mixed team
European Junior Championships
Gold medal – first place	2009 Milan	Mixed team
Bronze medal – third place	2009 Milan	Boys' doubles

Niclas Nøhr (born 2 August 1991) is a Danish badminton player, specializing in doubles play. He started playing badminton at Møn badminton club. In 2012, he joined Denmark national badminton team, and in 2015, he won a gold medal at the European Games with his mixed doubles partner Sara Thygesen.

After one year of a knee operation, he returned to the court. He said; "I'm just happy that my family, friends, and especially my girlfriend has supported me in such a hard time."

Nøhr announced his retirement from international tournaments through his Instagram account on 19 April 2022. He later started a new journey as a coach at the Hvidovre club, and also joining Australia coaching team in preparation for the 2022 Commonwealth Games.

== Achievements ==
=== European Games ===
Mixed doubles
Year	Venue	Partner	Opponent	Score	Result
2015	Baku Sports Hall, Baku, Azerbaijan	(Denmark) Sara Thygesen	(France) Gaëtan Mittelheisser (France) Audrey Fontaine	21–16, 21–16	Gold

=== European Championships ===
Mixed doubles
Year	Venue	Partner	Opponent	Score	Result
2016	Vendéspace, La Roche-sur-Yon, France	(Denmark) Sara Thygesen	(Denmark) Joachim Fischer Nielsen (Denmark) Christinna Pedersen	21–19, 13–21, 17–21	Silver

=== European Junior Championships ===
Boys' doubles
Year	Venue	Partner	Opponent	Score	Result
2009	Federal Technical Centre - Palabadminton, Milan, Italy	(Denmark) Steffen Rasmussen	(France) Sylvain Grosjean (Republic of Ireland) Sam Magee	23–25, 17–21	Bronze

=== BWF World Tour (2 titles, 3 runners-up) ===
The BWF World Tour, which was announced on 19 March 2017 and implemented in 2018, is a series of elite badminton tournaments sanctioned by the Badminton World Federation (BWF). The BWF World Tour is divided into levels of World Tour Finals, Super 1000, Super 750, Super 500, Super 300, and the BWF Tour Super 100.

Mixed doubles
Year	Tournament	Level	Partner	Opponent	Score	Result
2018	Spain Masters	Super 300	(Denmark) Sara Thygesen	(England) Marcus Ellis (England) Lauren Smith	21–19, 21–17	(gold) Winner
2018	Orléans Masters	Super 100	(Denmark) Sara Thygesen	(Germany) Peter Käsbauer (Germany) Olga Konon	21–19, 21–9	(gold) Winner
2018	German Open	Super 300	(Denmark) Sara Thygesen	(Malaysia) Goh Soon Huat (Malaysia) Shevon Jemie Lai	14–21, 20–22	(silver) Runner-up
2021	Orléans Masters	Super 100	(Denmark) Amalie Magelund	(Denmark) Mathias Christiansen (Denmark) Alexandra Bøje	13–21, 17–21	(silver) Runner-up
2021	Spain Masters	Super 300	(Denmark) Amalie Magelund	(Indonesia) Rinov Rivaldy (Indonesia) Pitha Haningtyas Mentari	18–21, 15–21	(silver) Runner-up

=== BWF Grand Prix (1 runner-up) ===
The BWF Grand Prix had two levels, the Grand Prix and Grand Prix Gold. It was a series of badminton tournaments sanctioned by the Badminton World Federation (BWF) and played between 2007 and 2017.

Mixed doubles
Year	Tournament	Partner	Opponent	Score	Result
2014	Scottish Open	(Denmark) Sara Thygesen	(Scotland) Robert Blair (Scotland) Imogen Bankier	18–21, 14–21	(silver) Runner-up

BWF Grand Prix Gold tournament
BWF Grand Prix tournament

=== BWF International Challenge/Series ===
Men's doubles
Year	Tournament	Partner	Opponent	Score	Result
2010	Cyprus International	(Denmark) Mads Pedersen	(Indonesia) Didit Juang Indrianto (Indonesia) Seiko Wahyu Kusdianto	15–21, 21–15, 19–21	(silver) Runner-up
2011	Croatian International	(Denmark) Mads Pedersen	(Denmark) Kim Astrup (Denmark) Rasmus Fladberg	21–18, 19–21, 16–21	(silver) Runner-up
2011	Cyprus International	(Denmark) Theis Christiansen	(Russia) Nikolaj Nikolaenko (Russia) Nikolai Ukk	21–17, 21–13	(gold) Winner
2011	Portugal International	(Denmark) Mads Pedersen	(Denmark) Mats Bue (Denmark) Anders Skaarup Rasmussen	28–26, 16–21, 21–17	(gold) Winner
2015	Polish International	(Denmark) Kasper Antonsen	(Poland) Paweł Pietryja (Poland) Wojciech Szkudlarczyk	17–21, 21–8, 21–12	(gold) Winner
2015	Italian International	(Denmark) Kasper Antonsen	(Denmark) Mathias Christiansen (Denmark) David Daugaard	24–22, 21–14	(gold) Winner
2015	Turkey International	(Denmark) Kasper Antonsen	(Poland) Adam Cwalina (Poland) Przemysław Wacha	21–16, 21–15	(gold) Winner
2017	Hellas Open	(Denmark) Kasper Antonsen	(Finland) Henri Aarnio (Finland) Iikka Heino	21–17, 21–12	(gold) Winner

Mixed doubles
Year	Tournament	Partner	Opponent	Score	Result
2010	Cyprus International	(Denmark) Lena Grebak	(Russia) Denis Grachev (Russia) Anastasia Chervyakova	21–13, 18–21, 21–12	(gold) Winner
2011	Cyprus International	(Denmark) Joan Christiansen	(Russia) Nikolaj Nikolaenko (Russia) Anastasia Chervyakova	23–21, 21–18	(gold) Winner
2013	Croatian International	(Denmark) Rikke Søby Hansen	(Denmark) Frederik Colberg (Denmark) Sara Thygesen	12–21, 21–12, 21–9	(gold) Winner
2014	Orléans International	(Denmark) Sara Thygesen	(Scotland) Robert Blair (Scotland) Imogen Bankier	13–21, 21–19, 18–21	(silver) Runner-up
2014	Croatian International	(Denmark) Sara Thygesen	(Denmark) Mads Pedersen (Denmark) Mai Surrow	21–15, 13–21 21–18	(gold) Winner
2014	Dutch International	(Denmark) Sara Thygesen	(Netherlands) Robin Tabeling (Netherlands) Myke Halkema	21–10, 21–5	(gold) Winner
2014	Irish Open	(Denmark) Sara Thygesen	(Germany) Peter Käsbauer (Germany) Isabel Herttrich	21–10, 21–18	(gold) Winner
2015	Italian International	(Denmark) Sara Thygesen	(England) Matthew Nottingham (England) Emily Westwood	21–10, 17–21, 21–19	(gold) Winner
2016	Finnish International	(Denmark) Sara Thygesen	(Denmark) Mathias Christiansen (Denmark) Lena Grebak	21–18, 21–23, 16–21	(silver) Runner-up
2021	Denmark Masters	(Denmark) Amalie Magelund	(Denmark) Jeppe Bay (Denmark) Sara Lundgaard	15–21, 14–21	(silver) Runner-up

BWF International Challenge tournament
BWF International Series tournament
BWF Future Series tournament
