= Mads Pedersen (badminton) =

Danish badminton player (born 1990)

Personal information
- Born: 14 February 1990 (age 36)

Sport
- Country: Denmark
- Sport: Badminton

Men's & mixed doubles
- Highest ranking: 86 (MD 2 September 2011); 171 (XD 15 September 2011)
- BWF profile
Medal record
Men's badminton
Representing Denmark
European Junior Championships
Gold medal – first place	2009 Milan	Mixed team
Silver medal – second place	2009 Milan	Boys' doubles

Mads Pedersen (born 14 February 1990) is a Danish badminton player.

== Achievements ==
=== European Junior Championships ===
Boys' doubles
Year	Venue	Partner	Opponent	Score	Result
2009	Federal Technical Centre - Palabadminton; Milan, Italy	(Denmark) Emil Holst	(France) Sylvain Grosjean (Republic of Ireland) Sam Magee	25–27, 21–14, 18–21	Silver

=== BWF International Challenge/Series ===
Men's doubles
Year	Tournament	Partner	Opponent	Score	Result
2010	Cyprus International	(Denmark) Niclas Nøhr	(Indonesia) Didit Juang Indrianto (Indonesia) Seiko Wahyu Kusdianto	15–21, 21–15, 19–21	(silver) Runner-up
2011	Croatian International	(Denmark) Niclas Nøhr	(Denmark) Kim Astrup (Denmark) Rasmus Fladberg	21–18, 19–21, 16–21	(silver) Runner-up
2011	Portugal International	(Denmark) Niclas Nøhr	(Denmark) Mats Bue (Denmark) Anders Skaarup Rasmussen	28–26, 16–21, 21–17	(gold) Winner
2014	Croatian International	(Denmark) Theodor Johansen	(Denmark) Mathias Christiansen (Denmark) David Daugaard	8–21, 12–21	(silver) Runner-up

Mixed doubles
Year	Tournament	Partner	Opponent	Score	Result
2014	Croatian International	(Denmark) Mai Surrow	(Denmark) Niclas Nøhr (Denmark) Sara Thygesen	15–21, 21–13, 18–21	(silver) Runner-up

BWF International Challenge tournament
BWF International Series tournament
BWF Future Series tournament
