= Iris Tabeling =

Dutch badminton player

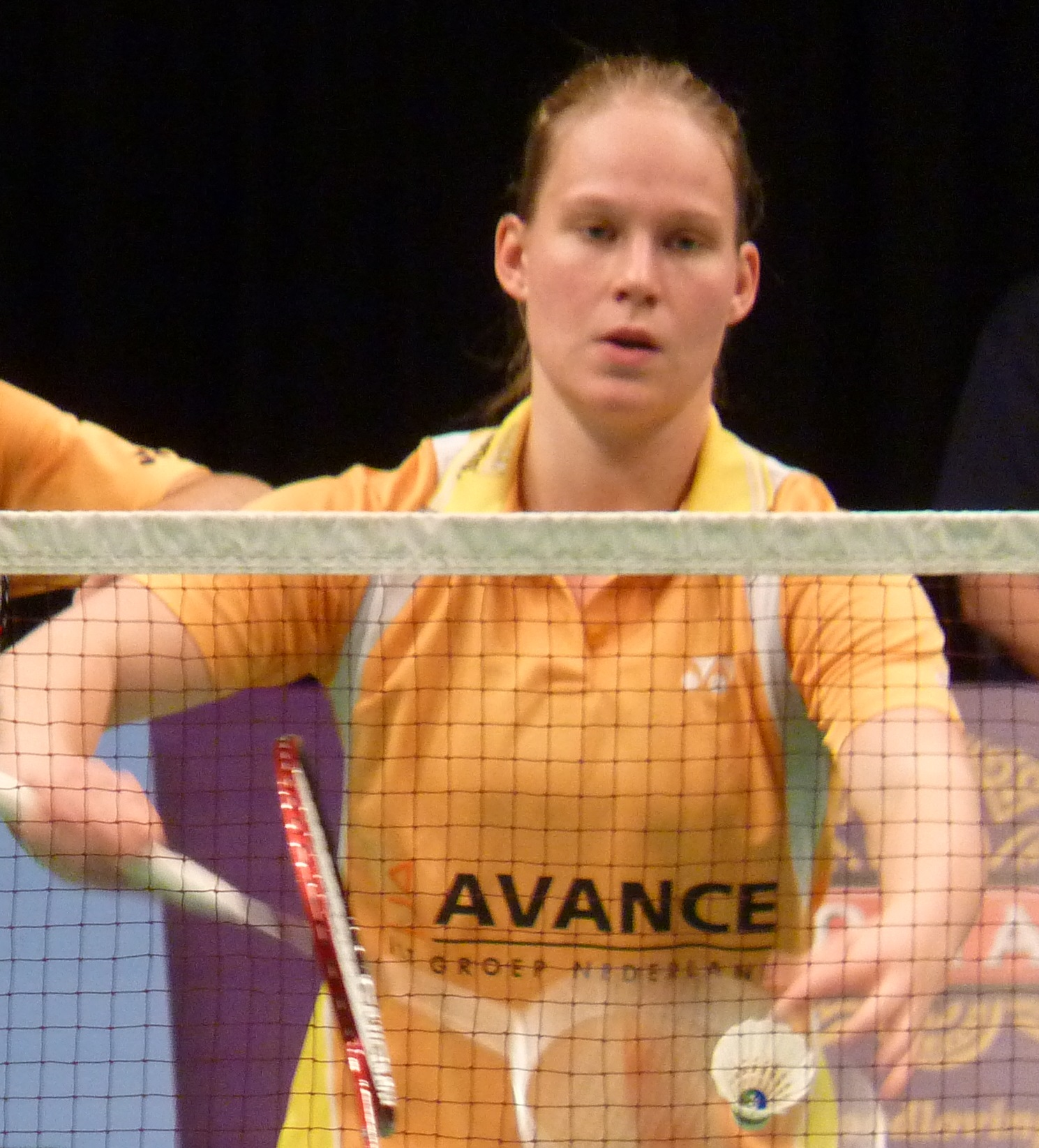

Personal information
- Born: 27 June 1991 (age 35) Amstelveen, Netherlands
- Height: 1.64 m (5 ft 5 in)

Sport
- Country: Netherlands
- Sport: Badminton

Women's & mixed doubles
- Highest ranking: 24 (WD 12 March 2015); 44 (XD 31 October 2013)
- BWF profile
Medal record
Women's badminton
Representing Netherlands
European Women's Team Championships
Bronze medal – third place	2012 Amsterdam	Women's team
European Junior Championships
Silver medal – second place	2007 Völklingen	Mixed team
Silver medal – second place	2009 Milan	Girls' doubles
Silver medal – second place	2009 Milan	Mixed team

Iris Tabeling (born 27 June 1991) is a Dutch badminton player. She is a women's doubles and mixed doubles specialist.

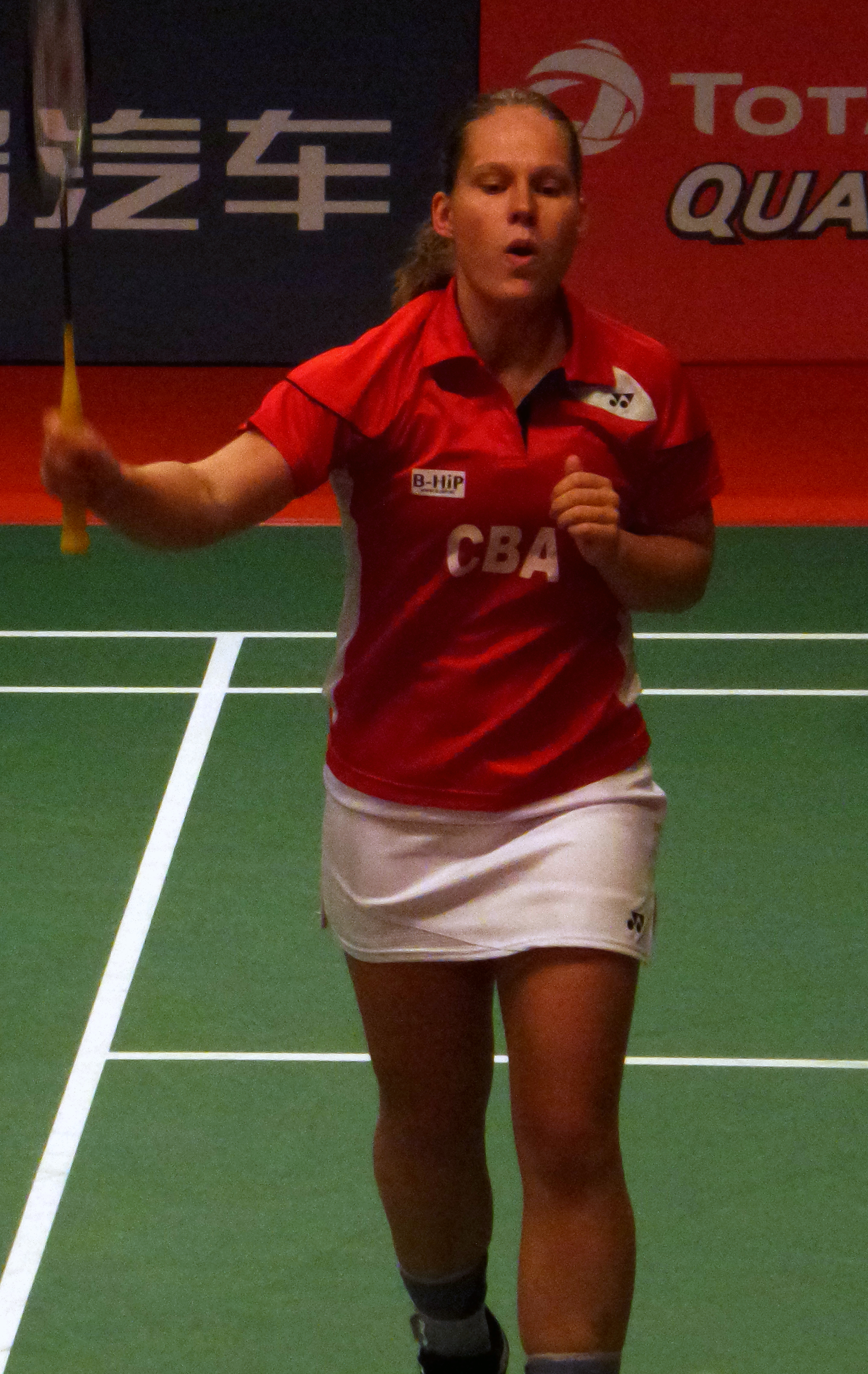
Tabeling at 2015 BWF World Championships

== Achievements ==
=== European Junior Championships ===
Girls' doubles
Year	Venue	Partner	Opponent	Score	Result
2009	Federal Technical Centre - Palabadminton; Milan, Italy	(Netherlands) Selena Piek	(Russia) Anastasia Chervyakova (Russia) Romina Gabdullina	13–21, 17–21	Silver

=== BWF Grand Prix ===
The BWF Grand Prix had two levels, the Grand Prix and Grand Prix Gold. It was a series of badminton tournaments sanctioned by the Badminton World Federation (BWF) and played between 2007 and 2017.

Women's doubles
Year	Tournament	Partner	Opponent	Score	Result
2015	Scottish Open	(Netherlands) Samantha Barning	(Japan) Yuki Fukushima (Japan) Sayaka Hirota	14–21, 11–14 retired	(silver) Runner-up

BWF Grand Prix Gold tournament
BWF Grand Prix tournament

=== BWF International Challenge/Series ===
Women's doubles
Year	Tournament	Partner	Opponent	Score	Result
2010	Czech International	(Netherlands) Selena Piek	(Denmark) Maria Helsbøl (Denmark) Anne Skelbæk	22–20, 15–21, 21–7	(gold) Winner
2010	Slovak Open	(Netherlands) Selena Piek	(Ukraine) Marija Ulitina (Ukraine) Natalya Voytsekh	21–10, 21–18	(gold) Winner
2010	Italian International	(Netherlands) Selena Piek	(Poland) Małgorzata Kurdelska (Poland) Natalia Pocztowiak	21–15, 21–9	(gold) Winner
2011	Estonian International	(Netherlands) Selena Piek	(Ukraine) Marija Ulitina (Ukraine) Natalya Voytsekh	21–12, 21–16	(gold) Winner
2012	Norwegian International	(Netherlands) Selena Piek	(Netherlands) Samantha Barning (Netherlands) Eefje Muskens	20–22, 16–21	(silver) Runner-up
2013	Swedish Masters	(Netherlands) Selena Piek	(Sweden) Emelie Lennartsson (Sweden) Emma Wengberg	21–15, 21–16	(gold) Winner
2014	Dutch International	(Netherlands) Samantha Barning	(Denmark) Maiken Fruergaard (Denmark) Sara Thygesen	21–16, 21–12	(gold) Winner
2014	Belgian International	(Netherlands) Samantha Barning	(Netherlands) Eefje Muskens (Netherlands) Selena Piek	18–21, 11–21	(silver) Runner-up
2014	Italian International	(Netherlands) Samantha Barning	(Russia) Victoria Dergunova (Russia) Olga Morozova	21–17, 21–15	(gold) Winner
2015	Swiss International	(Netherlands) Samantha Barning	(Indonesia) Pia Zebadiah Bernadet (Indonesia) Aprilsasi Putri Lejarsar Variella	21–11, 21–10	(gold) Winner
2016	Swedish Masters	(Netherlands) Samantha Barning	(Denmark) Maiken Fruergaard (Denmark) Sara Thygesen	19–21, 17–21	(silver) Runner-up
2016	Finnish Open	(Netherlands) Samantha Barning	(Japan) Misato Aratama (Japan) Akane Watanabe	12–21, 17–21	(silver) Runner-up
2016	Swiss International	(Netherlands) Cheryl Seinen	(Malaysia) Amelia Alicia Anscelly (Malaysia) Teoh Mei Xing	13–21, 22–20, 21–10	(gold) Winner

Mixed doubles
Year	Tournament	Partner	Opponent	Score	Result
2010	Czech International	(Netherlands) Jelle Maas	(Denmark) Anders Skaarup Rasmussen (Denmark) Anne Skelbæk	16–21, 11–21	(silver) Runner-up
2013	Swedish Masters	(Netherlands) Jelle Maas	(Germany) Peter Käsbauer (Germany) Isabel Herttrich	17–21, 14–21	(silver) Runner-up
2014	Belgian International	(Netherlands) Jelle Maas	(Netherlands) Jacco Arends (Netherlands) Selena Piek	5–11, 10–11, 7–11	(silver) Runner-up
2017	Bulgarian Open	(Bulgaria) Alex Vlaar	(Denmark) Mathias Thyrri (Denmark) Emilie Aalestrup	23–21, 21–15	(gold) Winner

BWF International Challenge tournament
BWF International Series tournament
BWF Future Series tournament
