= Emil Holst =

Danish badminton player (born 1991)

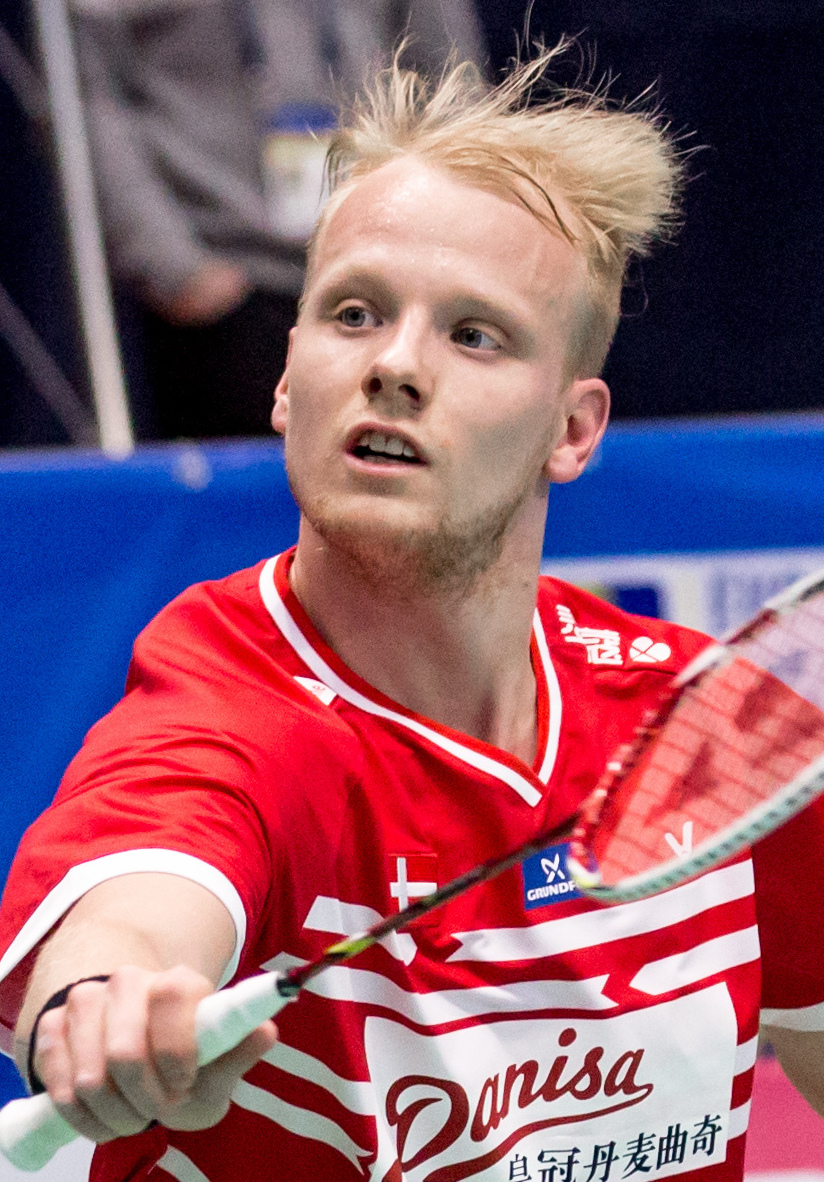
- Holst at the 2018 European Men's Team Championships

Personal information
- Born: 9 January 1991 (age 35) Køge, Denmark
- Years active: 2007
- Height: 1.86 m (6 ft 1 in)
- Weight: 78 kg (172 lb)

Sport
- Country: Denmark
- Sport: Badminton
- Handedness: Right
- Coached by: Kenneth Jonnasen

Men's singles & doubles
- Highest ranking: 37 (MS 26 October 2017); 181 (MD 16 April 2015)
- BWF profile
Medal record
Men's badminton
Representing Denmark
Thomas Cup
Gold medal – first place	2016 Kunshan	Men's team
European Games
Silver medal – second place	2015 Baku	Men's singles
European Men's Team Championships
Gold medal – first place	2014 Basel	Men's team
Gold medal – first place	2016 Kazan	Men's team
Gold medal – first place	2018 Kazan	Men's team
European Junior Championships
Gold medal – first place	2009 Milan	Boys' singles
Gold medal – first place	2009 Milan	Mixed team
Silver medal – second place	2009 Milan	Boys' doubles

Emil Holst (born 9 January 1991) is a Danish badminton player. He competed at the 2015 European Games and won a silver medal in the men's singles.

== Achievements ==
=== European Games ===
Men's singles
Year	Venue	Opponent	Score	Result
2015	Baku Sports Hall; Baku, Azerbaijan	(Spain) Pablo Abián	12–21, 21–23	Silver

=== European Junior Championships ===
Boys' singles
Year	Venue	Opponent	Score	Result
2009	Federal Technical Centre - Palabadminton; Milan, Italy	(Wales) Jamie van Hooijdonk	21–12, 21–11	Gold

Boys' doubles
Year	Venue	Partner	Opponent	Score	Result
2009	Federal Technical Centre - Palabadminton; Milan, Italy	(Denmark) Mads Pedersen	(France) Sylvain Grosjean (Republic of Ireland) Sam Magee	25–27, 21–14, 18–21	Silver

=== BWF International Challenge/Series ===
Men's singles
Year	Tournament	Opponent	Score	Result
2011	Norwegian International	(Finland) Ville Lång	21–19, 11–21, 10–21	(silver) Runner-up
2012	Kharkiv International	(Ukraine) Vitaly Konov	21–17, 21–18	(gold) Winner
2013	Bulgarian International	(Chinese Taipei) Wan Chia-hsin	21–16, 21–16	(gold) Winner
2014	Finnish Open	(France) Lucas Corvée	21–6, 21–15	(gold) Winner
2015	Polish Open	(Malaysia) Liew Daren	15–21, 11–21	(silver) Runner-up
2015	USA International	(Belgium) Yuhan Tan	21–16, 22–20	(gold) Winner
2016	Orleans International	(Denmark) Rasmus Fladberg	21–17, 21–13	(gold) Winner

Men's doubles
Year	Tournament	Partner	Opponent	Score	Result
2010	Iceland International	(Denmark) Mikkel Mikkelsen	(Denmark) Frederik Colberg (Denmark) Kasper Paulsen	21–15, 21–17	(gold) Winner
2014	Dutch International	(Denmark) Rasmus Fladberg	(Denmark) Kasper Antonsen (Denmark) Mikkel Delbo Larsen	15–21, 18–21	(silver) Runner-up

BWF International Challenge tournament
BWF International Series tournament
BWF Future Series tournament
