= Mak Hee Chun =

Malaysian-Hong Kong badminton player

Mak Hee Chun 麦喜俊
Personal information
- Born: 28 December 1990 (age 35) Perak, Malaysia
- Height: 1.82 m (6 ft 0 in)
- Weight: 72 kg (159 lb)

Sport
- Country: Hong Kong
- Sport: Badminton
- Handedness: Right

Men's & mixed doubles
- Highest ranking: 19 (MD 11 November 2010); 20 (XD 15 November 2010)
- Current ranking: 411 (MD); 440 (XD) (20 September 2022)
- BWF profile
Medal record
Men's badminton
Representing Hong Kong
Asia Mixed Team Championships
Bronze medal – third place	2019 Hong Kong	Mixed team
Representing Malaysia
Southeast Asian Games
Silver medal – second place	2011 Jakarta	Men's team
Bronze medal – third place	2015 Singapore	Men's team
World Junior Championships
Gold medal – first place	2008 Pune	Boys' doubles
Bronze medal – third place	2008 Pune	Mixed doubles
Bronze medal – third place	2008 Pune	Mixed team
Bronze medal – third place	2007 Waitakere	Boys' doubles
Bronze medal – third place	2006 Incheon	Boys' doubles
Bronze medal – third place	2006 Incheon	Mixed team
Asian Junior Championships
Gold medal – first place	2008 Kuala Lumpur	Boys' doubles
Gold medal – first place	2007 Kuala Lumpur	Mixed team
Silver medal – second place	2006 Kuala Lumpur	Mixed team
Bronze medal – third place	2008 Kuala Lumpur	Mixed team
Bronze medal – third place	2006 Kuala Lumpur	Boys' doubles

Mak Hee Chun (born 28 August 1990) is a Malaysian badminton player and represented Hong Kong since 2016.

== Career ==
He started his career as a junior player by reaching the semi-final round and winning bronze in the boys' doubles event at the BWF World Junior Championships in 2006 and 2007 with Lim Khim Wah. Partnered with Teo Kok Siang, he won gold in 2008. He also won bronze in the mixed doubles event with Vivian Hoo Kah Mun. At the 2008 Asia Junior Championships, he won gold in the boys' doubles teamed-up with Teo.

In 2009, he reached the final of the Malaysia International Challenge and became the runner-up in the mixed doubles event with Ng Hui Lin. At the same year, he reached the semi-final at the Malaysia Open Grand Prix Gold tournament in the men's doubles event partnered with Tan Wee Kiong. In September 2012, he dropped from the Badminton Association of Malaysia (BAM), and then started to play as an independent player. In 2014, he won the men's doubles title at the Malaysia National Circuit Grand Prix Finals with Tan Bin Shen.

In early 2015, he was recalled to join Malaysia national badminton team in order to strengthen the men's doubles department. But, in August 2015, he immediately resigned from the BAM due his performance with his partner in the men's doubles Teo Kok Siang unsatisfactory.

In 2016, he started to representing Hong Kong at the international tournament, and at the National Championships, he was the men's and mixed doubles runner-up partnered with Yeung Shing Choi and Tse Ying Suet respectively. In 2017, he won the mixed doubles title at the Tata Open India International Challenge tournament with Yeung Nga Ting.

== Achievements ==
=== BWF World Junior Championships ===
Boys' doubles
Year	Venue	Partner	Opponent	Score	Result
2008	Badminton Hall Shree Shiv Chhatrapati; Pune, India	(Malaysia) Teo Kok Siang	(China) Chai Biao (China) Qiu Zihan	21–18, 21–14	Gold
2007	Waitakere Trusts Stadium; Waitakere City, New Zealand	(Malaysia) Lim Khim Wah	(South Korea) Chung Eui-seok (South Korea) Shin Baek-cheol	13–21, 13–21	Bronze
2006	Samsan World Gymnasium; Incheon, South Korea	(Malaysia) Lim Khim Wah	(South Korea) Lee Yong-dae (South Korea) Cho Gun-woo	6–21, 11–21	Bronze

Mixed' doubles
Year	Venue	Partner	Opponent	Score	Result
2008	Badminton Hall Shree Shiv Chhatrapati; Pune, India	(Malaysia) Vivian Hoo Kah Mun	(China) Zhang Nan (China) Lu Lu	12–21, 7–21	Bronze

=== Asian Junior Championships ===
Boys' doubles
Year	Venue	Partner	Opponent	Score	Result
2008	Stadium Juara; Kuala Lumpur, Malaysia	(Malaysia) Teo Kok Siang	(South Korea) Choi Young-woo (South Korea) Kim Ki-jung	21–13, 21–18	Gold
2006	Kuala Lumpur Badminton Stadium; Kuala Lumpur, Malaysia	(Malaysia) Lim Khim Wah	(South Korea) Cho Gun-woo (South Korea) Lee Yong-dae	11–21, 15–21	Bronze

=== BWF International Challenge/Series ===
Men's doubles
Year	Tournament	Partner	Opponent	Score	Result
2014	Malaysia International	(Malaysia) Chow Pak Chuu	(Chinese Taipei) Lin Chia-yu (Chinese Taipei) Wu Hsiao-lin	12–21, 21–10, 20–22	(silver) Runner-up

Mixed doubles
Year	Tournament	Partner	Opponent	Score	Result
2019	Mongolia International	(Hong Kong) Chau Hoi Wah	(Thailand) Ratchapol Makkasasithorn (Thailand) Benyapa Aimsaard	22–20, 21–15	(gold) Winner
2017	Tata Open India International	(Hong Kong) Yeung Nga Ting	(Hong Kong) Chang Tak Ching (Hong Kong) Ng Wing Yung	21–11, 17–21, 21–18	(gold) Winner
2009	Malaysia International	(Malaysia) Ng Hui Lin	(Malaysia) Tan Wee Kiong (Malaysia) Woon Khe Wei	6–21, 21–13, 17–21	(silver) Runner-up

BWF International Challenge tournament
BWF Future Series tournament
