= Martin Giuffre =

Canadian badminton player (born 1990)

Martin Giuffre (born October 5, 1990 in Calgary) is a Canadian badminton player. He was the Pan American Junior Champion in 2008 and qualified to compete at the 2016 Summer Olympics.
