= Peter Käsbauer =

German badminton player (born 1988)

Personal information
- Born: 17 March 1988 (age 38) Weiden in der Oberpfalz, Germany
- Years active: 2007
- Height: 1.87 m (6 ft 2 in)

Sport
- Country: Germany
- Sport: Badminton
- Handedness: Right

Men's & mixed doubles
- Highest ranking: 34 (MD 27 February 2014); 21 (XD 5 March 2015)
- BWF profile
Medal record
Men's badminton
Representing Germany
European Mixed Team Championships
Silver medal – second place	2011 Amsterdam	Mixed team
Silver medal – second place	2019 Copenhagen	Mixed team
Bronze medal – third place	2015 Leuven	Mixed team
Bronze medal – third place	2017 Lubin	Mixed team
Bronze medal – third place	2021 Vantaa	Mixed team
European Men's Team Championships
Silver medal – second place	2012 Amsterdam	Men's team
Bronze medal – third place	2010 Warsaw	Men's team
Bronze medal – third place	2014 Basel	Men's team
Bronze medal – third place	2016 Kazan	Men's team
Bronze medal – third place	2018 Kazan	Men's team
European Junior Championships
Silver medal – second place	2007 Völklingen	Mixed doubles
Bronze medal – third place	2005 Den Bosch	Mixed team
Bronze medal – third place	2007 Völklingen	Boys' doubles

Peter Käsbauer (born 17 March 1988) is a German badminton player, specializing in doubles play. In 2007, he won a silver medal in the mixed doubles and a bronze medal in the boys' doubles at the European Junior Championships.

== Achievements ==
=== European Junior Championships ===
Boys' doubles
Year	Venue	Partner	Opponent	Score	Result
2007	Hermann-Neuberger-Halle; Völklingen, Saarbrücken, Germany	(Germany) Lukas Schmidt	(Denmark) Mads Conrad-Petersen (Denmark) Mads Pieler Kolding	15–21, 11–21	Bronze

Mixed doubles
Year	Venue	Partner	Opponent	Score	Result
2007	Hermann-Neuberger-Halle; Völklingen, Saarbrücken, Germany	(Germany) Julia Schmidt	(Denmark) Christian Larsen (Denmark) Joan Christiansen	16–21, 21–14, 10–21	Silver

=== BWF World Tour (1 runner-up) ===
The BWF World Tour, which was announced on 19 March 2017 and implemented in 2018, is a series of elite badminton tournaments sanctioned by the Badminton World Federation (BWF). The BWF World Tour is divided into levels of World Tour Finals, Super 1000, Super 750, Super 500, Super 300, and the BWF Tour Super 100.

Mixed doubles
Year	Tournament	Level	Partner	Opponent	Score	Result
2018	Orléans Masters	Super 100	(Germany) Olga Konon	(Denmark) Niclas Nøhr (Denmark) Sara Thygesen	19–21, 9–21	(silver) Runner-up

=== BWF Grand Prix (1 title, 1 runner-up) ===
The BWF Grand Prix had two levels, the Grand Prix and Grand Prix Gold. It was a series of badminton tournaments sanctioned by the Badminton World Federation (BWF) and played between 2007 and 2017.

Men's doubles
Year	Tournament	Partner	Opponent	Score	Result
2017	Thailand Open	(Germany) Raphael Beck	(Indonesia) Berry Angriawan (Indonesia) Hardianto	16–21, 16–21	(silver) Runner-up

Mixed doubles
Year	Tournament	Partner	Opponent	Score	Result
2014	U.S. Grand Prix	(Germany) Isabel Herttrich	(United States) Howard Shu (United States) Eva Lee	21–12, 21–14	(gold) Winner

BWF Grand Prix Gold tournament
BWF Grand Prix tournament

=== BWF International Challenge/Series (18 titles, 12 runners-up) ===
Men's doubles
Year	Tournament	Partner	Opponent	Score	Result
2008	Belgian International	(Germany) Roman Spitko	(Scotland) Andrew Bowman (Wales) Martyn Lewis	14–21, 15–21	(silver) Runner-up
2009	Welsh International	(Germany) Oliver Roth	(Russia) Vitalij Durkin (Russia) Aleksandr Nikolaenko	18–21, 18–21	(silver) Runner-up
2010	Spanish International	(Germany) Oliver Roth	(Netherlands) Ruud Bosch (Netherlands) Koen Ridder	21–13, 21–14	(gold) Winner
2010	Hungarian International	(Germany) Josche Zurwonne	(Germany) Maurice Niesner (Germany) Till Zander	21–17, 22–20	(gold) Winner
2010	Welsh International	(Germany) Josche Zurwonne	(England) Mark Middleton (England) Ben Stawski	21–19, 21–12	(gold) Winner
2011	Estonian International	(Germany) Josche Zurwonne	(France) Lucas Corvée (France) Joris Grosjean	21–8, 21–18	(gold) Winner
2011	Dutch International	(Germany) Josche Zurwonne	(France) Baptiste Carême (France) Sylvain Grosjean	11–21, 21–19, 17–21	(silver) Runner-up
2011	Spanish Open	(Germany) Josche Zurwonne	(Poland) Adam Cwalina (Poland) Michał Łogosz	14–21, 11–21	(silver) Runner-up
2012	French International	(Germany) Josche Zurwonne	(Germany) Andreas Heinz (Germany) Max Schwenger	26–24, 17–21, 21–11	(gold) Winner
2015	Bulgarian International	(Germany) Raphael Beck	(India) Manu Attri (India) B. Sumeeth Reddy	21–14, 21–16	(gold) Winner
2015	Irish Open	(Germany) Raphael Beck	(Poland) Adam Cwalina (Poland) Przemysław Wacha	21–16, 21–18	(gold) Winner
2018	Estonian International	(Germany) Johannes Pistorius	(Russia) Andrey Parakhodin (Russia) Nikolai Ukk	21–14, 18–21, 19–21	(silver) Runner-up
2018	KaBaL International	(Germany) Johannes Pistorius	(Germany) Bjarne Geiss (Germany) Jan Colin Völker	13–21, 14–21	(silver) Runner-up
2019	Finnish Open	(Germany) Jones Ralfy Jansen	(Indonesia) Muhammad Shohibul Fikri (Indonesia) Bagas Maulana	17–21, 17–21	(silver) Runner-up
2019	Lagos International	(Germany) Jones Ralfy Jansen	(India) Arjun M. R. (India) Ramchandran Shlok	21–11, 21–8	(gold) Winner
2019	Irish Open	(Germany) Jones Ralfy Jansen	(Scotland) Alexander Dunn (Scotland) Adam Hall	21–19, 17–21, 21–18	(gold) Winner

Mixed doubles
Year	Tournament	Partner	Opponent	Score	Result
2009	Hungarian International	(Germany) Johanna Goliszewski	(Poland) Wojciech Szkudlarczyk (Poland) Agnieszka Wojtkowska	15–21, 21–8, 10–21	(silver) Runner-up
2010	Spanish International	(Germany) Johanna Goliszewski	(Republic of Ireland) Sam Magee (Republic of Ireland) Chloe Magee	11–21, 9–21	(silver) Runner-up
2010	Hungarian International	(Germany) Johanna Goliszewski	(Netherlands) Jacco Arends (Netherlands) Selena Piek	15–21, 14–21	(silver) Runner-up
2010	Welsh International	(Germany) Johanna Goliszewski	(Germany) Josche Zurwonne (Germany) Carla Nelte	21–15, 21–13	(gold) Winner
2012	French International	(Germany) Johanna Goliszewski	(Malaysia) Nelson Heg (Malaysia) Chow Mei Kuan	21–12, 21–11	(gold) Winner
2012	Swiss International	(Germany) Isabel Herttrich	(England) Ben Stawski (England) Alyssa Lim	21–18, 21–12	(gold) Winner
2013	Swedish Masters	(Germany) Isabel Herttrich	(Netherlands) Jelle Maas (Netherlands) Iris Tabeling	21–17, 21–14	(gold) Winner
2013	White Nights	(Germany) Isabel Herttrich	(Russia) Sergey Shumilkin (Russia) Viktoriia Vorobeva	24–22, 21–15	(gold) Winner
2014	Swedish Masters	(Germany) Isabel Herttrich	(Scotland) Robert Blair (Scotland) Imogen Bankier	22–24, 21–14, 16–21	(silver) Runner-up
2014	Irish Open	(Germany) Isabel Herttrich	(Denmark) Niclas Nøhr (Denmark) Sara Thygesen	10–21, 18–21	(silver) Runner-up
2017	Turkey International	(Germany) Olga Konon	(Ukraine) Valeriy Atrashchenkov (Ukraine) Yelyzaveta Zharka	21–18, 22–20	(gold) Winner
2018	Estonian International	(Germany) Olga Konon	(England) Gregory Mairs (England) Jenny Moore	21–14, 21–12	(gold) Winner
2018	Portugal International	(Germany) Olga Konon	(Chinese Taipei) Lu Chen (Chinese Taipei) Li Zi-qing	21–8, 21–12	(gold) Winner
2018	KaBaL International	(Germany) Olga Konon	(Poland) Paweł Śmiłowski (Poland) Magdalena Świerczyńska	21–10, 21–11	(gold) Winner

BWF International Challenge tournament
BWF International Series tournament
BWF Future Series tournament
