= Lauren Smith (badminton) =

English badminton player

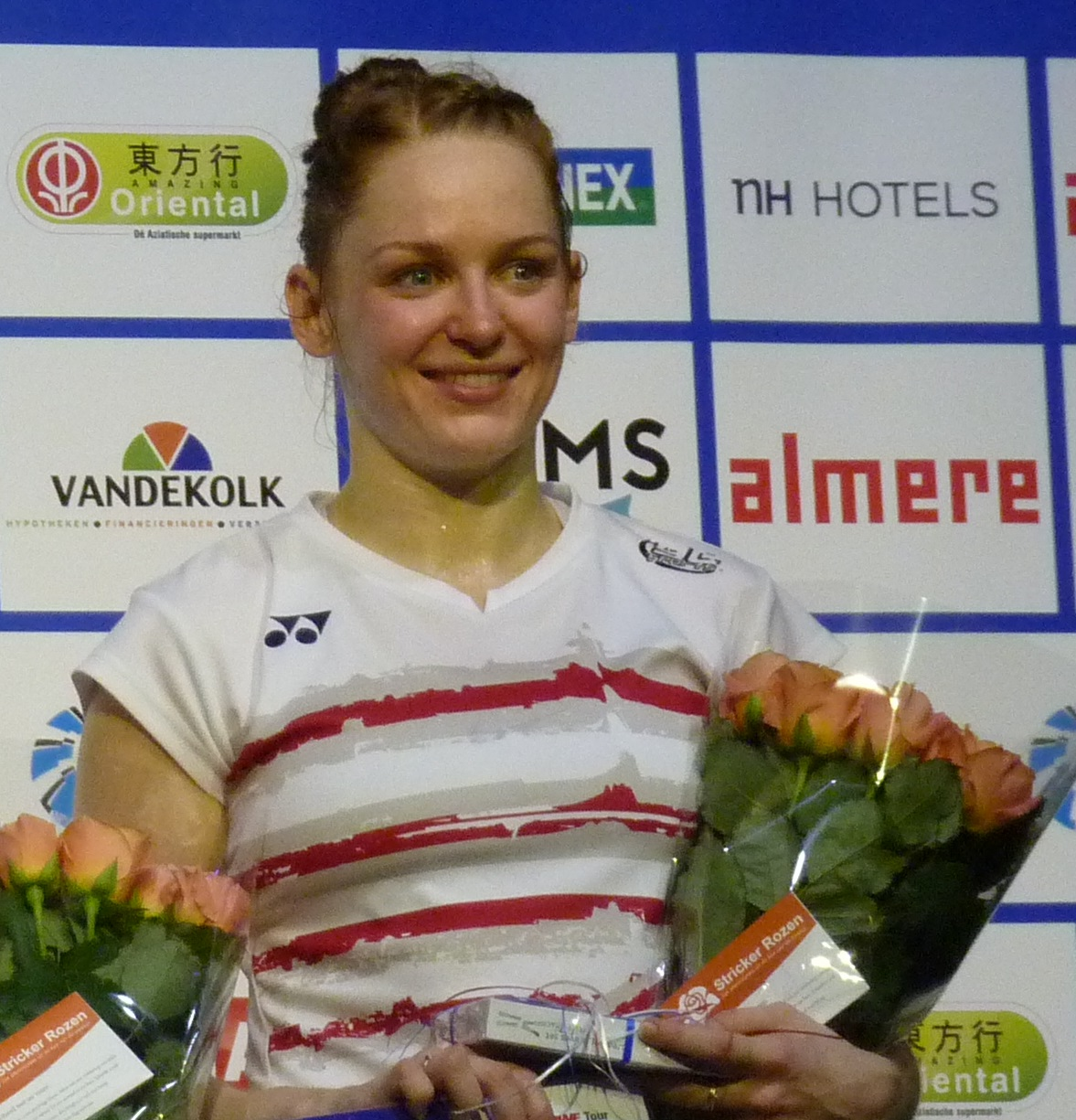

Personal information
- Born: 26 September 1991 (age 35) Carlisle, Cumbria, England
- Height: 1.71 m (5 ft 7 in)
- Weight: 70 kg (154 lb)

Sport
- Country: England
- Sport: Badminton
- Handedness: Right
- Coached by: Julian Robertson

Women's & mixed doubles
- Highest ranking: 12 (WD with Chloe Birch 25 January 2022); 7 (XD with Marcus Ellis 21 June 2018)
- BWF profile
Medal record
Women's badminton
Representing Great Britain
European Games
Gold medal – first place	2019 Minsk	Mixed doubles
Silver medal – second place	2019 Minsk	Women's doubles
Bronze medal – third place	2023 Kraków–Małopolska	Mixed doubles
Representing England
Commonwealth Games
Silver medal – second place	2014 Glasgow	Mixed team
Silver medal – second place	2018 Gold Coast	Women's doubles
Silver medal – second place	2018 Gold Coast	Mixed doubles
Silver medal – second place	2022 Birmingham	Women's doubles
Silver medal – second place	2022 Birmingham	Mixed doubles
Bronze medal – third place	2014 Glasgow	Women's doubles
Bronze medal – third place	2018 Gold Coast	Mixed team
European Championships
Silver medal – second place	2021 Kyiv	Women's doubles
Silver medal – second place	2021 Kyiv	Mixed doubles
Bronze medal – third place	2017 Kolding	Women's doubles
Bronze medal – third place	2018 Huelva	Mixed doubles
European Mixed Team Championships
Silver medal – second place	2015 Leuven	Mixed team
Bronze medal – third place	2013 Moscow	Mixed team
Bronze medal – third place	2017 Lubin	Mixed team
Bronze medal – third place	2023 Aire-sur-la-Lys	Mixed team
European Junior Championships
Bronze medal – third place	2009 Milan	Mixed doubles
Bronze medal – third place	2009 Milan	Mixed team

Lauren Smith (born 26 September 1991) is an English badminton player. She competed for England in the women's doubles and mixed team events at the 2014 Commonwealth Games where she won a bronze and silver medal respectively. In 2016, she represented Great Britain at the Summer Olympics in Rio de Janeiro, Brazil.

Teamed-up with Gabby Adcock, she won the women's doubles gold medals at the English National Badminton Championships in 2013 and 2014. In 2015 and 2016, she also won the women's doubles title partnered with Heather Olver.

Smith qualified to represent Great Britain at the 2019 European Games, played in the women's doubles with Chloe Birch and in the mixed doubles with Marcus Ellis. Competed as the unseeded and second seeds in the women's and mixed doubles event respectively, she reached the finals in both events. She and Birch managed to claim the silver medal after lose a match to Dutch pair in the rubber games. She then claimed the mixed doubles gold medal with Ellis; they beat their compatriots Chris Adcock and Gabby Adcock by the score 21–14, 21–9.

== Career ==
Smith played at the 2020 Summer Olympics in the women's doubles with Chloe Birch and in the mixed doubles with Marcus Ellis. At the Games, she was eliminated in the group stage and quarter-finals respectively. It was also revealed by the Olympic committee that she is dating her partner Marcus.

== Achievements ==
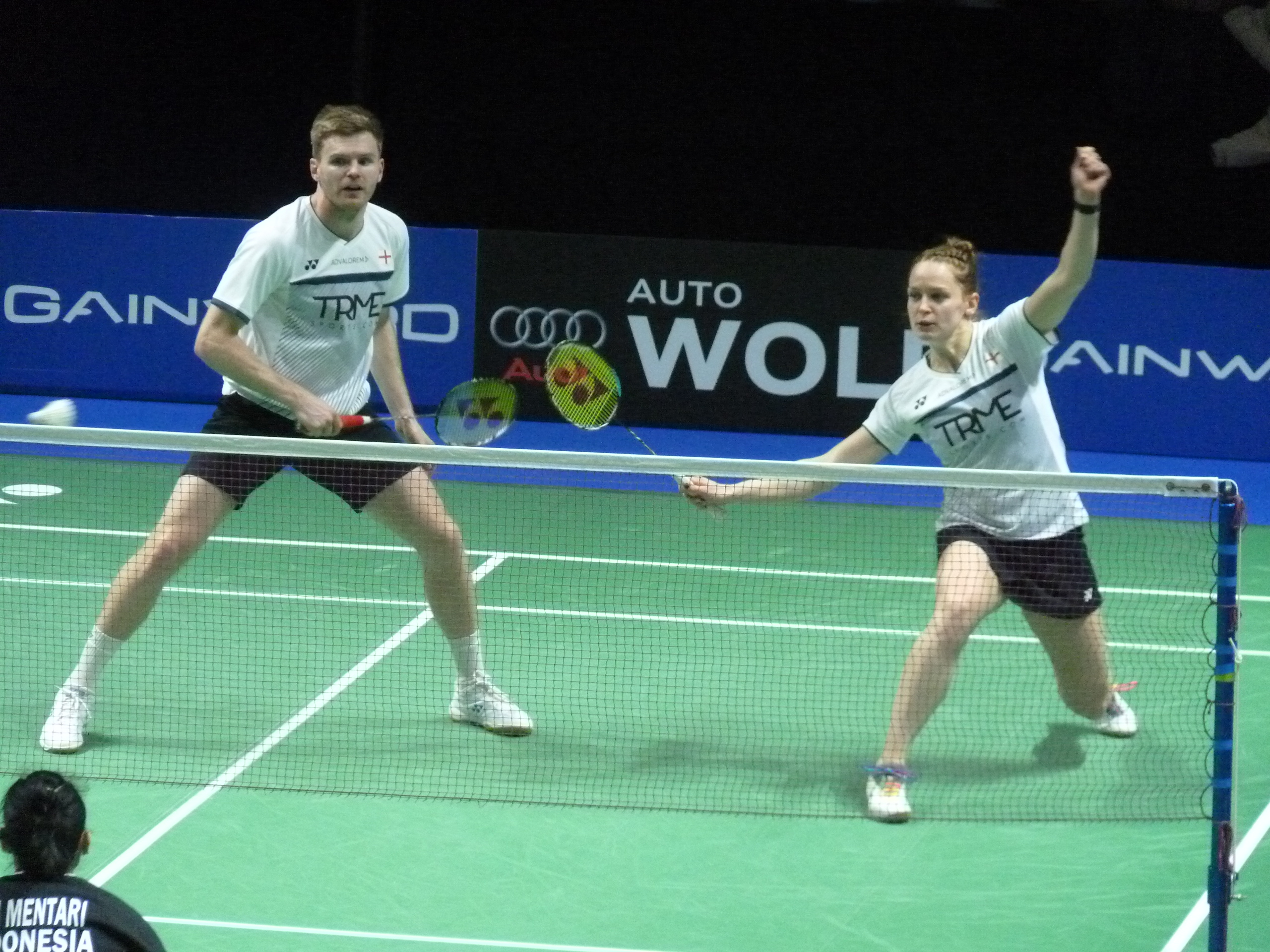
Marcus Ellis and Lauren Smith at the German Open 2022

=== Commonwealth Games ===
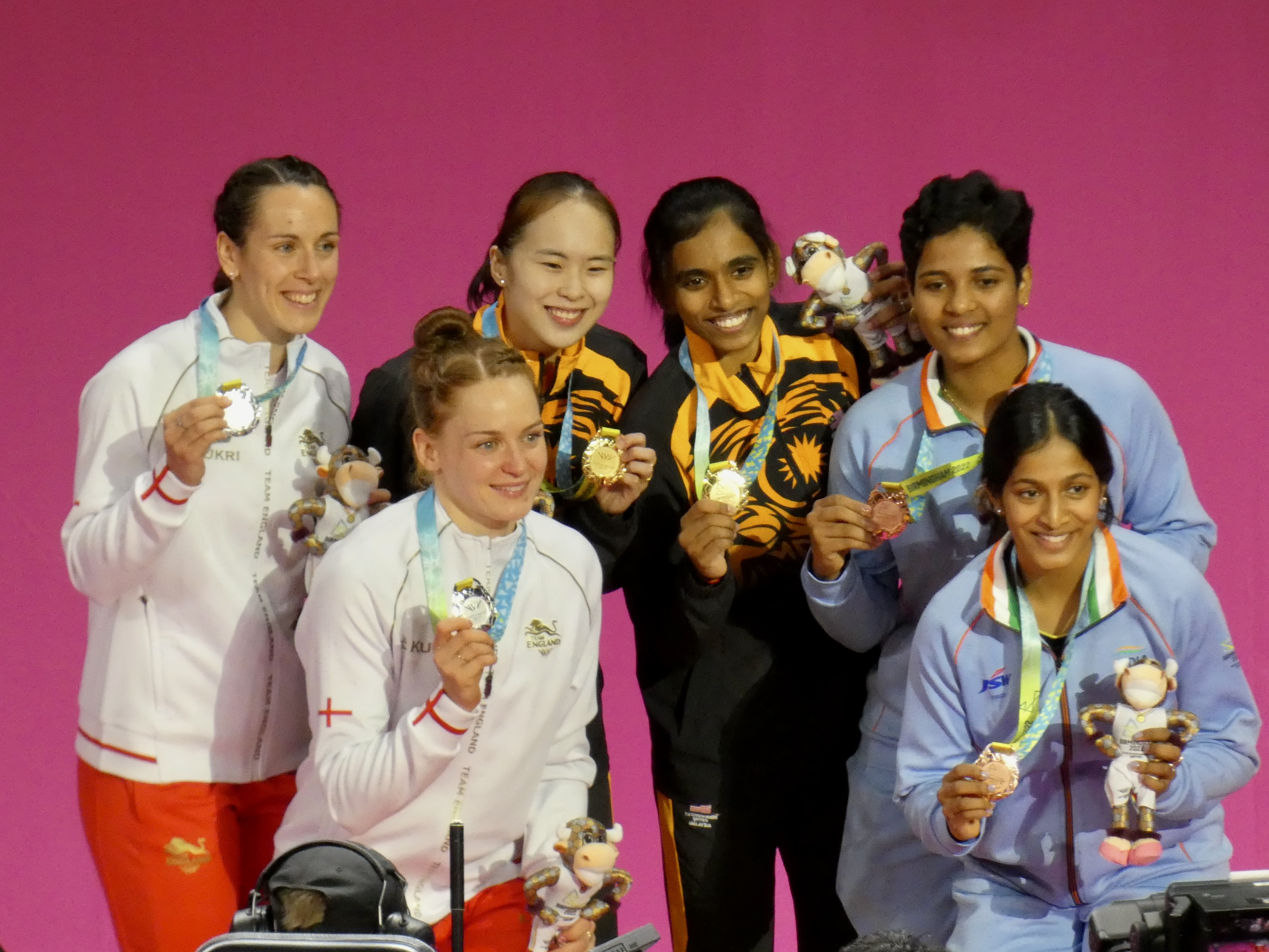
The six medallists in the women's badminton doubles at the 2022 Commonwealth Games in Birmingham. Left to right: Chloe Birch and Lauren Smith (England), Pearly Tan and Thinaah Muralitharan (Malaysia), Treesa Jolly and Gayathri Gopichand (India).

Women's doubles
Year	Venue	Partner	Opponent	Score	Result
2014	Emirates Arena; Glasgow, Scotland	(England) Gabby Adcock	(Malaysia) Lai Pei Jing (Malaysia) Lim Yin Loo	16–21, 21–15, 21–16	Bronze
2018	Carrara Sports and Leisure Centre; Gold Coast, Australia	(England) Sarah Walker	(Malaysia) Chow Mei Kuan (Malaysia) Vivian Hoo	12–21, 12–21	Silver
2022	National Exhibition Centre, Birmingham, England	(England) Chloe Birch	(Malaysia) Pearly Tan (Malaysia) Thinaah Muralitharan	5–21, 8–21	Silver

Mixed doubles
Year	Venue	Partner	Opponent	Score	Result
2018	Carrara Sports and Leisure Centre; Gold Coast, Australia	(England) Marcus Ellis	(England) Chris Adcock (England) Gabby Adcock	21–19, 17–21, 16–21	Silver
2022	National Exhibition Centre; Birmingham, England	(England) Marcus Ellis	(Singapore) Terry Hee (Singapore) Tan Wei Han	16–21, 15–21	Silver

=== European Games ===
Women's doubles
Year	Venue	Partner	Opponent	Score	Result
2019	Falcon Club; Minsk, Belarus	(United Kingdom) Chloe Birch	(Netherlands) Selena Piek (Netherlands) Cheryl Seinen	21–14, 13–21, 15–21	Silver

Mixed doubles
Year	Venue	Partner	Opponent	Score	Result
2019	Falcon Club; Minsk, Belarus	(United Kingdom) Marcus Ellis	(United Kingdom) Chris Adcock (United Kingdom) Gabby Adcock	21–14, 21–9	Gold
2023	Arena Jaskółka; Tarnów, Poland	(United Kingdom) Marcus Ellis	(France) Thom Gicquel (France) Delphine Delrue	18–21, 21–14, 18–21	Bronze

=== European Championships ===
Women's doubles
Year	Venue	Partner	Opponent	Score	Result
2017	Sydbank Arena; Kolding, Denmark	(England) Sarah Walker	(Bulgaria) Gabriela Stoeva (Bulgaria) Stefani Stoeva	15–21, 15–21	Bronze
2021	Palace of Sports; Kyiv, Ukraine	(England) Chloe Birch	(Bulgaria) Gabriela Stoeva (Bulgaria) Stefani Stoeva	14–21, 19–21	Silver

Mixed doubles
Year	Venue	Partner	Opponent	Score	Result
2018	Palacio de los Deportes Carolina Marín; Huelva, Spain	(England) Marcus Ellis	(Denmark) Mathias Christiansen (Denmark) Christinna Pedersen	16–21, 21–19, 12–21	Bronze
2021	Palace of Sports; Kyiv, Ukraine	(England) Marcus Ellis	(Russia) Rodion Alimov (Russia) Alina Davletova	21–11, 16–21, 15–21	Silver

=== European Junior Championships ===
Mixed doubles
Year	Venue	Partner	Opponent	Score	Result
2009	Federal Technical Centre - Palabadminton; Milan, Italy	(England) Ben Stawski	(Netherlands) Jacco Arends (Netherlands) Selena Piek	6–21, 14–21	Bronze

=== BWF World Tour (6 titles, 4 runners-up) ===
The BWF World Tour, which was announced on 19 March 2017 and implemented in 2018, is a series of elite badminton tournaments sanctioned by the Badminton World Federation (BWF). The BWF World Tour is divided into levels of World Tour Finals, Super 1000, Super 750, Super 500, Super 300, and the BWF Tour Super 100.

Women's doubles
Year	Tournament	Level	Partner	Opponent	Score	Result
2019	Orléans Masters	Super 100	(England) Chloe Birch	(Chinese Taipei) Hsu Ya-ching (Chinese Taipei) Hu Ling-fang	21–18, 21–17	(gold) Winner
2019	SaarLorLux Open	Super 100	(England) Chloe Birch	(China) Liu Xuanxuan (China) Xia Yuting	16–21, 13–21	(silver) Runner-up

Mixed doubles
Year	Tournament	Level	Partner	Opponent	Score	Result
2018	Swiss Open	Super 300	(England) Marcus Ellis	(Germany) Mark Lamsfuß (Germany) Isabel Herttrich	20–22, 19–21	(silver) Runner-up
2018	Canada Open	Super 100	(England) Marcus Ellis	(Germany) Mark Lamsfuß (Germany) Isabel Herttrich	21–13, 21–4	(gold) Winner
2018	Spain Masters	Super 300	(England) Marcus Ellis	(Denmark) Niclas Nøhr (Denmark) Sara Thygesen	19–21, 17–21	(silver) Runner-up
2018	Dutch Open	Super 100	(England) Marcus Ellis	(France) Thom Gicquel (France) Delphine Delrue	21–15, 21–15	(gold) Winner
2018	SaarLorLux Open	Super 100	(England) Marcus Ellis	(China) Lu Kai (China) Chen Lu	19–21, 21–18, 21–10	(gold) Winner
2018	Scottish Open	Super 100	(England) Marcus Ellis	(Netherlands) Jacco Arends (Netherlands) Selena Piek	13–6 retired	(gold) Winner
2019	Syed Modi International	Super 300	(England) Marcus Ellis	(Russia) Rodion Alimov (Russia) Alina Davletova	18–21, 16–21	(silver) Runner-up
2020	Thailand Masters	Super 300	(England) Marcus Ellis	(Indonesia) Hafiz Faizal (Indonesia) Gloria Emanuelle Widjaja	21–16, 13–21, 21–16	(gold) Winner

=== BWF Grand Prix (1 title, 2 runners-up) ===
The BWF Grand Prix had two levels, the Grand Prix and Grand Prix Gold. It was a series of badminton tournaments sanctioned by the Badminton World Federation (BWF) and played between 2007 and 2017.

Women's doubles
Year	Tournament	Partner	Opponent	Score	Result
2014	Scottish Open	(England) Heather Olver	(Bulgaria) Gabriela Stoeva (Bulgaria) Stefani Stoeva	7–21, 15–21	(silver) Runner-up
2016	Canada Open	(England) Heather Olver	(Australia) Setyana Mapasa (Australia) Gronya Somerville	15–21, 16–21	(silver) Runner-up

Mixed doubles
Year	Tournament	Partner	Opponent	Score	Result
2017	Dutch Open	(England) Marcus Ellis	(Netherlands) Jacco Arends (Netherlands) Selena Piek	21–17, 21–18	(gold) Winner

BWF Grand Prix Gold tournament
BWF Grand Prix tournament

=== BWF International Challenge/Series (14 titles, 15 runners-up) ===
Women's doubles
Year	Tournament	Partner	Opponent	Score	Result
2010	Portugal International	(England) Alexandra Langley	(Belgium) Steffi Annys (Belgium) Severine Corvilain	13–21, 21–13, 21–18	(gold) Winner
2011	Portugal International	(England) Alexandra Langley	(England) Helen Davies (England) Alyssa Lim	14–21, 21–14, 21–17	(gold) Winner
2011	Turkiye Open	(England) Alexandra Langley	(Bulgaria) Gabriela Stoeva (Bulgaria) Stefani Stoeva	14–21, 21–16, 10–21	(silver) Runner-up
2011	Welsh International	(England) Alexandra Langley	(Malaysia) Ng Hui Ern (Malaysia) Ng Hui Lin	16–21, 14–21	(silver) Runner-up
2012	Denmark International	(England) Gabrielle White	(Denmark) Line Damkjær Kruse (Denmark) Marie Røpke	18–21, 19–21	(silver) Runner-up
2012	Welsh International	(England) Gabrielle White	(Scotland) Jillie Cooper (Scotland) Kirsty Gilmour	21–7, 21–14	(gold) Winner
2014	Welsh International	(England) Heather Olver	(England) Sophie Brown (England) Kate Robertshaw	21–11, 21–17	(gold) Winner
2015	Austrian International	(England) Heather Olver	(Indonesia) Suci Rizky Andini (Indonesia) Maretha Dea Giovani	14–21, 21–23	(silver) Runner-up
2015	Orleans International	(England) Heather Olver	(Bulgaria) Gabriela Stoeva (Bulgaria) Stefani Stoeva	20–22, 21–16, 9–21	(silver) Runner-up
2015	Finnish Open	(England) Heather Olver	(France) Delphine Lansac (France) Émilie Lefel	21–13, 23–21	(gold) Winner
2015	Kharkiv International	(England) Heather Olver	(Thailand) Jongkongphan Kittiharakul (Thailand) Rawinda Prajongjai	18–21, 15–21	(silver) Runner-up
2015	Welsh International	(England) Heather Olver	(Bulgaria) Gabriela Stoeva (Bulgaria) Stefani Stoeva	10–21, 20–22	(silver) Runner-up
2015	USA International	(England) Heather Olver	(Thailand) Puttita Supajirakul (Thailand) Sapsiree Taerattanachai	18–21, 21–19, 21–19	(gold) Winner
2016	Orleans International	(England) Heather Olver	(France) Delphine Delrue (France) Léa Palermo	21–19, 21–8	(gold) Winner
2016	Peru International	(England) Heather Olver	(Germany) Johanna Goliszewski (Germany) Carla Nelte	18–21, 21–19, 19–21	(silver) Runner-up
2016	Belgian International	(England) Chloe Birch	(Denmark) Julie Finne-Ipsen (Denmark) Rikke Søby Hansen	24–22, 18–21, 21–18	(gold) Winner
2016	Czech International	(England) Sarah Walker	(Bulgaria) Mariya Mitsova (Bulgaria) Petya Nedelcheva	21–12, 21–18	(gold) Winner
2017	Czech Open	(England) Sarah Walker	(Japan) Erina Honda (Japan) Nozomi Shimizu	13–21, 21–14, 16–21	(silver) Runner-up
2018	Czech Open	(England) Chloe Birch	(France) Émilie Lefel (France) Anne Tran	21–14, 21–14	(gold) Winner
2019	Denmark International	(England) Chloe Birch	(Japan) Saori Ozaki (Japan) Akane Watanabe	13–21, 18–21	(silver) Runner-up
2019	Azerbaijan International	(England) Chloe Birch	(Russia) Ekaterina Bolotova (Russia) Alina Davletova	21–18, 21–12	(gold) Winner
2019	Kharkiv International	(England) Chloe Birch	(Canada) Rachel Honderich (Canada) Kristen Tsai	21–14, 21–18	(gold) Winner
2022	Dutch Open	(England) Chloe Birch	(Netherlands) Debora Jille (Netherlands) Cheryl Seinen	10–5 retired	(silver) Runner-up
2022	Welsh International	(England) Chloe Birch	(France) Margot Lambert (France) Anne Tran	21–9, 14–21, 9–21	(silver) Runner-up

Mixed doubles
Year	Tournament	Partner	Opponent	Score	Result
2011	Portugal International	(England) Ben Stawski	(England) Robin Middleton (England) Alexandra Langley	23–25, 19–21	(silver) Runner-up
2011	Turkiye Open	(England) Ben Stawski	(England) Chris Coles (England) Jessica Fletcher	21–19, 21–13	(gold) Winner
2012	Polish Open	(England) Ben Stawski	(England) Nathan Robertson (England) Jenny Wallwork	15–21, 11–21	(silver) Runner-up
2017	Italian International	(England) Marcus Ellis	(England) Ben Lane (England) Jessica Pugh	21–16, 19–21, 4–21	(silver) Runner-up
2023	Belgian International	(England) Marcus Ellis	(Denmark) Mikkel Mikkelsen (Denmark) Rikke Søby Hansen	21–18, 21–15	(gold) Winner

BWF International Challenge tournament
BWF International Series tournament
