= Teo Kok Siang =

Malaysian badminton player (born 1990)

Teo Kok Siang 张国祥
Personal information
- Born: 26 August 1990 (age 36) Johor, Malaysia
- Height: 1.72 m (5 ft 8 in)
- Spouse: Cheah Yee See

Sport
- Country: Malaysia
- Sport: Badminton
- Handedness: Right

Men's doubles
- Highest ranking: 21 (17 March 2011)
- BWF profile
Medal record
Men's badminton
Representing Malaysia
Southeast Asian Games
| Bronze medal – third place | 2013 Naypyidaw | Men's doubles |
| Bronze medal – third place | 2015 Singapore | Men's team |
World Junior Championships
| Gold medal – first place | 2008 Pune | Boys' doubles |
| Bronze medal – third place | 2006 Incheon | Mixed team |
| Bronze medal – third place | 2008 Pune | Mixed team |
Asian Junior Championships
| Gold medal – first place | 2008 Kuala Lumpur | Boys' doubles |
| Bronze medal – third place | 2008 Kuala Lumpur | Mixed team |

Teo Kok Siang (born 26 August 1990) is a Malaysian former badminton player who currently works as a doubles coach in the national team of his country.

== Career ==
Siang won the gold medals at the Asian and World Junior Championships in the boys' doubles partnered with Mak Hee Chun. In 2013, he reach the semi-final round at the Southeast Asian Games partnered with Goh V Shem but was defeated by the Indonesian pair, and they settled for bronze. In 2015, he submitted his resignation letters to the Badminton Association of Malaysia (BAM), and started to play as an independent player. He started coaching independent players; Goh Soon Huat and Shevon Jemie Lai in January 2023.

== Personal life ==
His elder brother Teo Kok Seng is also a world junior champion from 1998.

Teo Kok Siang got engaged with former badminton player Cheah Yee See in August 2025.

== Achievements ==
=== Southeast Asian Games ===
Men's doubles
| Year | Venue | Partner | Opponent | Score | Result |
|---|---|---|---|---|---|
| 2013 | Wunna Theikdi Indoor Stadium; Naypyidaw, Myanmar | (Malaysia) Goh V Shem | (Indonesia) Berry Angriawan (Indonesia) Ricky Karanda Suwardi | 17–21, 18–21 | Bronze |

=== BWF World Junior Championships ===
Boys' doubles
| Year | Venue | Partner | Opponent | Score | Result |
|---|---|---|---|---|---|
| 2008 | Badminton Hall Shree Shiv Chhatrapati; Pune, India | (Malaysia) Mak Hee Chun | (China) Chai Biao (China) Qiu Zihan | 21–18, 21–14 | Gold |

=== Asian Junior Championships ===
Boys' doubles
| Year | Venue | Partner | Opponent | Score | Result |
|---|---|---|---|---|---|
| 2008 | Stadium Juara; Kuala Lumpur, Malaysia | (Malaysia) Mak Hee Chun | (South Korea) Choi Young-woo (South Korea) Kim Ki-jung | 21–13, 21–18 | Gold |

=== BWF International Challenge/Series ===
Men's doubles
| Year | Tournament | Partner | Opponent | Score | Result |
|---|---|---|---|---|---|
| 2010 | Vietnam International | (Malaysia) Goh Wei Shem | (South Korea) Kim Ki-jung (South Korea) Shin Baek-choel | 21–23, 21–17, 21–19 | (gold) Winner |

BWF International Challenge tournament
BWF International Series tournament
