= Ben Stawski =

English badminton player (born 1990)

Personal information
- Born: 5 June 1990 (age 36) Nuneaton, Warwickshire, England

Sport
- Country: England
- Sport: Badminton

Men's singles & doubles
- Highest ranking: 593 (MS 22 October 2009); 64 (MD 12 September 2013); 59 (XD 4 October 2012)
- BWF profile
Medal record
Men's badminton
Representing England
European Junior Championships
Bronze medal – third place	2009 Milan	Mixed doubles
Bronze medal – third place	2009 Milan	Mixed team

Ben Stawski (born 5 June 1990) is a badminton player from England. He graduated from Loughborough College with a Foundation Degree in Sports Science in 2010. In 2009, he won bronze medals at the European Junior Badminton Championships in team and mixed doubles event.

== Achievements ==
=== European Junior Championships ===
Mixed doubles
Year	Venue	Partner	Opponent	Score	Result
2009	Federal Technical Centre - Palabadminton, Milan, Italy	(England) Lauren Smith	(Netherlands) Jacco Arends (Netherlands) Selena Piek	6–21, 14–21	Bronze

=== BWF International Challenge/Series (2 titles, 5 runners-up) ===
Men's doubles
Year	Tournament	Partner	Opponent	Score	Result
2011	Turkiye Open	(Scotland) Paul van Rietvelde	(Denmark) Mikkel Mikkelsen (Denmark) Nikolaj Overgaard	21–19, 21–13	(gold) Winner
2010	Welsh International	(England) Mark Middleton	(Germany) Peter Käsbauer (Germany) Josche Zurwonne	19–21, 12–21	(silver) Runner-up

Mixed doubles
Year	Tournament	Partner	Opponent	Score	Result
2016	Bulgarian International	(Bulgaria) Lubomira Stoynova	(Turkey) Melih Turgut (Turkey) Fatma Nur Yavuz	13–21, 16–21	(silver) Runner-up
2012	Swiss International	(England) Alyssa Lim	(Germany) Peter Käsbauer (Germany) Isabel Herttrich	18–21, 12–21	(silver) Runner-up
2012	Polish Open	(England) Lauren Smith	(England) Nathan Robertson (England) Jenny Wallwork	15–21, 11–21	(silver) Runner-up
2011	Portugal International	(England) Lauren Smith	(England) Robin Middleton (England) Alexandra Langley	23–25, 19–21	(silver) Runner-up
2011	Turkiye Open	(England) Lauren Smith	(England) Christopher Coles (England) Jessica Fletcher	21–19, 21–13	(gold) Winner

BWF International Challenge tournament
BWF International Series tournament
BWF Future Series tournament
