= Anastasiia Akchurina =

Russian badminton player (born 1992)

Personal information
- Born: Anastasia Mihailovna Chervyakova (Анастасия Михайловна Червякова); 14 June 1992 (age 34) Nizhny Novgorod, Russia
- Years active: 2007
- Height: 1.74 m (5 ft 9 in)

Sport
- Country: Russia
- Sport: Badminton
- Handedness: Right

Women's singles & doubles
- Highest ranking: 85 (WS, 10 April 2014); 19 (WD 30 November 2017); 74 (XD, 17 September 2015)
- BWF profile
Medal record
Women's badminton
Representing Russia
European Championships
Bronze medal – third place	2017 Kolding	Women's doubles
European Mixed Team Championships
Silver medal – second place	2017 Lubin	Mixed team
Bronze medal – third place	2015 Leuven	Mixed team
Bronze medal – third place	2021 Vantaa	Mixed team
European Women's Team Championships
Silver medal – second place	2014 Basel	Women's team
Bronze medal – third place	2018 Kazan	Women's team
European Junior Championships
Gold medal – first place	2009 Milan	Girls' doubles
Silver medal – second place	2011 Vantaa	Mixed team

Anastasiia Akchurina (born 14 June 1992 as Anastasia Mihailovna Chervyakova; Russian: Анастасия Михайловна Червякова) is a Russian badminton player. She won the gold medal at the 2009 European Junior Championships, and later a bronze medal at the 2017 European Championships.

== Achievements ==
=== European Championships ===
Women's doubles
Year	Venue	Partner	Opponent	Score	Result
2017	Sydbank Arena; Kolding, Denmark	(Russia) Olga Morozova	(Denmark) Christinna Pedersen (Denmark) Kamilla Rytter Juhl	10–21, 13–21	Bronze

=== European Junior Championships ===
Girls' doubles
Year	Venue	Partner	Opponent	Score	Result
2009	Federal Technical Centre - Palabadminton; Milan, Italy	(Russia) Romina Gabdullina	(Netherlands) Selena Piek (Netherlands) Iris Tabeling	21–13, 21–17	Gold

=== BWF World Tour (1 runner-up) ===
The BWF World Tour, which was announced on 19 March 2017 and implemented in 2018, is a series of elite badminton tournaments sanctioned by the Badminton World Federation (BWF). The BWF World Tour is divided into levels of World Tour Finals, Super 1000, Super 750, Super 500, Super 300, and the BWF Tour Super 100.

Women's doubles
Year	Tournament	Level	Partner	Opponent	Score	Result
2022	India Open	Super 500	(Russia) Olga Morozova	(Thailand) Benyapa Aimsaard (Thailand) Nuntakarn Aimsaard	13–21, 5–21	(silver) Runner-up

=== BWF Grand Prix (2 titles) ===
The BWF Grand Prix had two levels, the Grand Prix and Grand Prix Gold. It was a series of badminton tournaments sanctioned by the Badminton World Federation (BWF) and played between 2007 and 2017.

Women's doubles
Year	Tournament	Partner	Opponent	Score	Result
2013	Russian Open	(Russia) Nina Vislova	(Russia) Irina Khlebko (Russia) Ksenia Polikarpova	21–16, 21–18	(gold) Winner
2016	Russian Open	(Russia) Olga Morozova	(Russia) Evgeniya Kosetskaya (Russia) Ksenia Polikarpova	21–14, 22–20	(gold) Winner

BWF Grand Prix Gold tournament
BWF Grand Prix tournament

=== BWF International Challenge/Series (15 titles, 8 runners-up) ===
Women's singles
Year	Tournament	Opponent	Score	Result
2015	Riga International	(Lithuania) Akvilė Stapušaitytė	24–26, 21–14, 21–12	(gold) Winner

Women's doubles
Year	Tournament	Partner	Opponent	Score	Result
2009	Cyprus International	(Russia) Natalia Perminova	(New Zealand) Danielle Barry (New Zealand) Donna Haliday	21–18, 22–20	(gold) Winner
2010	Turkey International	(Russia) Maria Korobeyinkova	(France) Laura Choinet (France) Audrey Fontaine	21–15, 21–11	(gold) Winner
2011	Cyprus International	(Russia) Tatjana Bibik	(Denmark) Celine Juel (Denmark) Josephine van Zaane	21–12, 21–11	(gold) Winner
2012	Spanish Open	(Russia) Tatjana Bibik	(England) Mariana Agathangelou (England) Alexandra Langley	12–21, 21–16, 21–18	(gold) Winner
2012	White Nights	(Russia) Tatjana Bibik	(Russia) Evgeniya Kosetskaya (Russia) Viktoriia Vorobeva	Walkover	(gold) Winner
2013	Swiss International	(Russia) Nina Vislova	(Sweden) Emelie Lennartsson (Sweden) Emma Wengberg	21–18, 18–21, 21–13	(gold) Winner
2014	Estonian International	(Russia) Nina Vislova	(Netherlands) Myke Halkema (Netherlands) Gayle Mahulette	21–9, 21–12	(gold) Winner
2014	Polish Open	(Russia) Nina Vislova	(Japan) Ayane Kurihara (Japan) Naru Shinoya	15–21, 21–17, 22–20	(gold) Winner
2014	Bahrain International Challenge	(Russia) Nina Vislova	(Russia) Ekaterina Bolotova (Russia) Evgeniya Kosetskaya	6–21, 15–21	(silver) Runner-up
2015	Swedish Masters	(Russia) Nina Vislova	(England) Sophie Brown (England) Kate Robertshaw	17–21, 23–21, 21–14	(gold) Winner
2015	Spanish Open	(Russia) Olga Morozova	(Bulgaria) Gabriela Stoeva (Bulgaria) Stefani Stoeva	16–21, 11–21	(silver) Runner-up
2016	Estonian International	(Russia) Olga Morozova	(Estonia) Kristin Kuuba (Estonia) Helina Rüütel	21–14, 21–15	(gold) Winner
2016	White Nights	(Russia) Olga Morozova	(Japan) Asumi Kugo (Japan) Megumi Yokoyama	17–21, 7–21	(silver) Runner-up
2016	Welsh International	(Russia) Olga Morozova	(India) Ashwini Ponnappa (India) N. Sikki Reddy	21–16, 21–11	(gold) Winner
2016	Italian International	(Russia) Olga Morozova	(Bulgaria) Mariya Mitsova (Bulgaria) Petya Nedelcheva	21–18, 21-17	(gold) Winner
2017	White Nights	(Russia) Olga Morozova	(France) Delphine Delrue (France) Léa Palermo	21–8, 21-15	(gold) Winner
2019	Estonian International	(Russia) Olga Morozova	(Denmark) Julie Finne-Ipsen (Denmark) Mai Surrow	12–21, 21–17, 14–21	(silver) Runner-up
2019	Austrian Open	(Russia) Olga Morozova	(China) Liu Xuanxuan (China) Xia Yuting	17–21, 15–21	(silver) Runner-up

Mixed doubles
Year	Tournament	Partner	Opponent	Score	Result
2010	Cyprus International	(Russia) Denis Grachev	(Denmark) Niclas Nøhr (Denmark) Lena Grebak	13–21, 21–18, 12–21	(silver) Runner-up
2011	Cyprus International	(Russia) Nikolaj Nikolaenko	(Denmark) Niclas Nøhr (Denmark) Joan Christiansen	21–23, 18–21	(silver) Runner-up
2015	Riga International	(Russia) Andrey Parokhodin	(Denmark) Mads Emil Christensen (Denmark) Cecilie Sentow	21–18, 21–17	(gold) Winner
2015	Lithuanian International	(Russia) Andrey Parokhodin	(Denmark) Søren Toft Hansen (France) Teshana Vignes Waran	14–21, 17–21	(silver) Runner-up

BWF International Challenge tournament
BWF International Series tournament
BWF Future Series tournament
