= James van Hooijdonk =

Welsh international badminton player

Personal information
- Nationality: British (Welsh)
- Born: 27 August 1991 Netherlands

Sport
- Sport: Badminton
Medal record
Representing Wales
Welsh Nationals
Gold medal – first place	2009	men's singles

James van Hooijdonk (born 27 August 1991) also known as Jamie van Hooijdonk is a former international badminton player from Wales who competed at the Commonwealth Games and is a former champion of Wales.

== Biography ==
Van Hooijdonk was born in the Netherlands. He competed at the 2008 Commonwealth Youth Games and in 2009 won a silver medal at the European Junior Championships.

van Hooijdonk represented the Welsh team at the 2010 Commonwealth Games in Delhi, India, where he competed in the singles event. After the Games he continued to play for Wales.

He earned eight caps for his country and was the 2009 singles champion of Wales at the Welsh National Badminton Championships.

After retiring from playing he pursued a career in dentistry.
