= Romina Gabdullina =

Russian badminton player (born 1993)

Personal information
- Born: Romina Eduardovna Gabdullina (Ромина Эдуардовна Габдуллина); 17 March 1993 (age 33) Moscow, Russia

Sport
- Country: Russia
- Sport: Badminton

Women's singles & doubles
- Highest ranking: 70 (WS, 14 March 2013); 102 (WD, 21 April 2011); 188 (XD, 21 April 2011)
- BWF profile
Medal record
Women's badminton
Representing Russia
European Junior Championships
Gold medal – first place	2009 Milan	Girls' doubles
Silver medal – second place	2011 Vantaa	Mixed team

Romina Eduardovna Gabdullina (Russian: Ромина Эдуардовна Габдуллина; born 17 March 1993) is a Russian badminton player. She won 2009 European Junior Badminton Championships in the women's doubles event at Milan, Italy. In 2012, she became the runner-up of Iceland International tournament in women's singles event.

== Achievements ==
=== European Junior Championships ===
Girls' doubles
Year	Venue	Partner	Opponent	Score	Result
2009	Federal Technical Centre - Palabadminton; Milan, Italy	(Russia) Anastasia Chervyakova	(Netherlands) Selena Piek (Netherlands) Iris Tabeling	21–13, 21–17	Gold

=== BWF International Challenge/Series ===
Women's singles
Year	Tournament	Opponent	Score	Result
2012	Iceland International	(Chinese Taipei) Chiang Mei-hui	17–21, 17–21	(silver) Runner-up

Women's doubles
Year	Tournament	Partner	Opponent	Score	Result
2010	Cyprus International	(Russia) Evgeniya Kosetskaya	(Denmark) Lena Grebak (Denmark) Camilla Overgaard	21–18, 21–9	(gold) Winner

BWF International Challenge tournament
BWF International Series tournament
