= Turkey International =

Annual international badminton tournament in Turkey

The Turkey International in badminton is an international open held in Turkey since 2007. The tournament belongs to the Badminton Europe Circuit.

== Previous winners ==
=== Turkey International ===
Year	Men's singles	Women's singles	Men's doubles	Women's doubles	Mixed doubles	Ref
2007	(Denmark) Hans-Kristian Vittinghus	(Germany) Juliane Schenk	(Germany) Kristof Hopp (Germany) Ingo Kindervater	(Germany) Nicole Grether (Germany) Juliane Schenk	(Germany) Ingo Kindervater (Germany) Kathrin Piotrowski	
2008	No competition					
2009	(Finland) Ville Lång	(Turkey) Li Shuang	(Sweden) Joel Johansson-Berg (Indonesia) Imam Sodikin	(Sweden) Emelie Lennartsson (Sweden) Emma Wengberg	(Indonesia) Indra Viki Okvana (Indonesia) Gustiani Megawati	
2010	(Poland) Przemysław Wacha	(Netherlands) Judith Meulendijks	(Russia) Vladimir Ivanov (Russia) Ivan Sozonov	(Russia) Anastasia Chervaykova (Russia) Maria Korobeyinkova	(Denmark) Mads Pieler Kolding (Denmark) Julie Houmann	
2011 (I)	(Germany) Fabian Hammes	(Greece) Anne Hald Jensen	(England) Ben Stawski (Scotland) Paul van Rietvelde	(Bulgaria) Gabriela Stoeva (Bulgaria) Stefani Stoeva	(England) Ben Stawski (England) Lauren Smith	
2011 (II)	(South Korea) Hong Ji-hoon	(Bulgaria) Petya Nedelcheva	(South Korea) Kim Gi-jung (South Korea) Kim Sa-rang	(Germany) Sandra Marinello (Germany) Birgit Michels	(South Korea) Cho Gun-woo (South Korea) Yoo Hyun-young	
2012	(Ukraine) Dmytro Zavadsky	(Republic of Ireland) Chloe Magee	(Scotland) Robert Blair (Malaysia) Tan Bin Shen	(Bulgaria) Gabriela Stoeva (Bulgaria) Stefani Stoeva	(Republic of Ireland) Sam Magee (Republic of Ireland) Chloe Magee	
2013	(Belgium) Yuhan Tan	(Bulgaria) Stefani Stoeva	(Russia) Nikita Khakimov (Russia) Vasily Kuznetsov	(Bulgaria) Gabriela Stoeva (Bulgaria) Stefani Stoeva	(Finland) Anton Kaisti (Bulgaria) Gabriela Stoeva	
2014	(Austria) Matthias Almer	(Turkey) Neslihan Yiğit	(Russia) Konstantin Abramov (Russia) Alexandr Zinchenko	(Bulgaria) Gabriela Stoeva (Bulgaria) Stefani Stoeva	(Germany) Jones Ralfy Jansen (Germany) Cisita Joity Jansen	
2015 (I)	(Belgium) Yuhan Tan	(Estonia) Kati Tolmoff	(Hungary) Gergely Krausz (Thailand) Samatcha Tovannakasem	(Turkey) Kader İnal (Turkey) Fatma Nur Yavuz	(Turkey) Melih Turgut (Turkey) Fatma Nur Yavuz	
2015 (II)	(Germany) Marc Zwiebler	(Germany) Karin Schnaase	(Denmark) Kasper Antonsen (Denmark) Niclas Nøhr	(Bulgaria) Gabriela Stoeva (Bulgaria) Stefani Stoeva	(Poland) Robert Mateusiak (Poland) Nadieżda Zięba	
2016	(Denmark) Patrick Bjerregaard	(Turkey) Cemre Fere	(France) Vanmael Hériau (France) Florent Riancho	(Turkey) Özge Bayrak (Turkey) Neslihan Yiğit	(Turkey) Melih Turgut (Turkey) Fatma Nur Yavuz	
2017	(France) Lucas Claerbout	(Turkey) Özge Bayrak	(Scotland) Alexander Dunn (Scotland) Adam Hall	(Turkey) Bengisu Erçetin (Turkey) Nazlıcan İnci	(Germany) Peter Käsbauer (Germany) Olga Konon	
2018	(Indonesia) Ikhsan Rumbay	(Turkey) Özge Bayrak	(Indonesia) Leo Rolly Carnando (Indonesia) Daniel Marthin	(Indonesia) Nita Violina Marwah (Indonesia) Putri Syaikah	(Singapore) Danny Bawa Chrisnanta (Singapore) Tan Wei Han	
2019	(Spain) Luís Enrique Peñalver	(Turkey) Neslihan Yiğit	(Denmark) Mikkel Stoffersen (Denmark) Mads Vestergaard	(Turkey) Bengisu Erçetin (Turkey) Nazlıcan İnci	(Denmark) Mikkel Stoffersen (Denmark) Susan Ekelund	
2020	Cancelled (Note: This tournament, originally to be played from 14 to 17 December, was later cancelled due to the COVID-19 pandemic in Turkey.)					
2021	No competition					
2022	Cancelled (Note: This tournament, originally to be played from 19 to 22 December, was later cancelled due to the COVID-19 pandemic in Turkey.)					
2023	No competition					
2024	(Finland) Kalle Koljonen	(Azerbaijan) Keisha Fatimah Azzahra	(France) Julien Maio (France) William Villeger	(Spain) Paula López (Spain) Lucía Rodríguez	(France) Julien Maio (France) Léa Palermo	
2025	(England) Harry Huang	(Turkey) Neslihan Arın	(India) Hariharan Amsakarunan (India) Arjun M. R.	(Bulgaria) Gabriela Stoeva (Bulgaria) Stefani Stoeva	(India) Hariharan Amsakarunan (India) Treesa Jolly	
2026	(Denmark) Victor Ørding Kauffmann	(India) Anmol Kharb	(Denmark) William Kryger Boe (Denmark) Rasmus Espersen	(Japan) Mao Hatasue (Japan) Kanano Muroya	(France) Natan Begga (France) Elsa Jacob	

=== Turkey International Future Series ===
Year	Men's singles	Women's singles	Men's doubles	Women's doubles	Mixed doubles	Ref
2025	(Italy) Christopher Vittoriani	(Turkey) Özge Bayrak	(Turkey) Buğra Aktaş (Turkey) Emre Sönmez	(Turkey) Yasemen Bektaş (Turkey) Sinem Yıldız	(Turkey) Emre Sönmez (Turkey) Yasemen Bektaş	
2026	(Turkey) Mehmet Can Töremiş	(Switzerland) Azkya Aliefa Ruhanda	(Germany) Simon Schenk (Germany) Ole Schroth	(Individual Neutral Athletes) Maryna Yanbayeva (Individual Neutral Athletes) Sofiya Yanouskaya	(Turkey) Buğra Aktaş (Turkey) Sinem Yıldız	

== Performances by nation ==
=== Turkey International ===
As of the 2026 edition

Pos.	Nation	MS	WS	MD	WD	XD	Total
1	Turkey*	0	7	0	4	2	13
2	Germany	2	2	1	2	3	10
3	Bulgaria	0	2	0	6	0.5	8.5
4	Denmark	3	0	3	0	2	8
5	France	1	0	2	0	2	5
6	Indonesia	1	0	1.5	1	1	4.5
7	Russia	0	0	3	1	0	4
8	India	0	1	1	0	1	3
8	South Korea	1	0	1	0	1	3
10	England	1	0	0.5	0	1	2.5
10	Finland	2	0	0	0	0.5	2.5
12	Belgium	2	0	0	0	0	2
12	Ireland	0	1	0	0	1	2
12	Poland	1	0	0	0	1	2
12	Scotland	0	0	2	0	0	2
12	Spain	1	0	0	1	0	2
17	Sweden	0	0	0.5	1	0	1.5
18	Austria	1	0	0	0	0	1
18	Azerbaijan	0	1	0	0	0	1
18	Estonia	0	1	0	0	0	1
18	Greece	0	1	0	0	0	1
18	Japan	0	0	0	1	0	1
18	Netherlands	0	1	0	0	0	1
18	Singapore	0	0	0	0	1	1
18	Ukraine	1	0	0	0	0	1
26	Hungary	0	0	0.5	0	0	0.5
26	Malaysia	0	0	0.5	0	0	0.5
26	Thailand	0	0	0.5	0	0	0.5
Total		17	17	17	17	17	85

=== Turkey International Future Series ===
As of the 2025 edition

Pos.	Nation	MS	WS	MD	WD	XD	Total
1	Turkey*	0	1	1	1	1	4
2	Italy	1	0	0	0	0	1
Total		1	1	1	1	1	5

* Host nation
