= Sylvain Grosjean =

French badminton player (born 1990)

Personal information
- Born: 19 September 1990 (age 36) Lyon, France

Sport
- Country: France
- Sport: Badminton
- Handedness: Right

Men's & mixed doubles
- Highest ranking: 35 (MD 3 November 2011); 71 (XD 20 October 2011)
- BWF profile
Medal record
Men's badminton
Representing France
European Junior Championships
Gold medal – first place	2009 Milan	Boys' doubles

Sylvain Grosjean (born 19 September 1990) is a French badminton player. He has won numerous junior title in France, and in 2009 he attracted the international attention by winning the boys' doubles title at the European Junior Championships partnered with Sam Magee of Ireland. In 2011, he also won the men's doubles title at the Dutch International tournament with Baptiste Carême. In 2012, he decided to retire from the French Badminton Association (INSEP), and focused on his studies in physiotherapy.

== Achievements ==
=== European Junior Championships ===
Boys' doubles
Year	Venue	Partner	Opponent	Score	Result
2009	Federal Technical Centre - Palabadminton; Milan, Italy	(Republic of Ireland) Sam Magee	(Denmark) Emil Holst (Denmark) Mads Pedersen	27–25, 14–21, 21–18	Gold

=== BWF International Challenge/Series ===
Men's doubles
Year	Tournament	Partner	Opponent	Score	Result
2011	Dutch International	(France) Baptiste Carême	(Germany) Peter Käsbauer (Germany) Josche Zurwonne	21–11, 19–21, 21–17	(gold) Winner

BWF International Challenge tournament
BWF International Series tournament
