= 2018 European Men's and Women's Team Badminton Championships =

Tournament details
- Dates: 13–18 February
- Edition: 7
- Venue: Kazan Gymnastics Center
- Location: Kazan, Russia

The 2018 edition of the European Men's and Women's Team Badminton Championships was held in Kazan, Russia, from 13 to 18 February 2018. This tournament also served as European qualification for the 2018 Thomas & Uber Cup.

== Medalists ==
Event	Gold	Silver	Bronze
Men's Team	Denmark; Anders Antonsen; Anders Skaarup Rasmussen; David Daugaard; Emil Holst; Hans-Kristian Vittinghus; Jan O. Jorgensen; Kim Astrup; Mads Conrad-Petersen; Mads Pieler Kolding; Mathias Christiansen; Rasmus Gemke; Viktor Axelsen	England; Ben Lane; Chris Langridge; David Jones; Marcus Ellis; Peter Briggs; Rajiv Ouseph; Sam Parsons; Sean Vendy; Toby Penty; Tom Wolfenden	Germany; Alexander Roovers; Fabian Roth; Jones Ralfy Jansen; Josche Zurwonne; Kai Schäfer; Lars Schänzler; Marc Zwiebler; Mark Lamsfuß; Marvin Seidel; Max Weißkirchen; Peter Käsbauer
Men's Team	Denmark; Anders Antonsen; Anders Skaarup Rasmussen; David Daugaard; Emil Holst; Hans-Kristian Vittinghus; Jan O. Jorgensen; Kim Astrup; Mads Conrad-Petersen; Mads Pieler Kolding; Mathias Christiansen; Rasmus Gemke; Viktor Axelsen	England; Ben Lane; Chris Langridge; David Jones; Marcus Ellis; Peter Briggs; Rajiv Ouseph; Sam Parsons; Sean Vendy; Toby Penty; Tom Wolfenden	France; Arnaud Merklé; Bastian Kersaudy; Brice Leverdez; Gaetan Mittelheisser; Julien Maio; Leo Rossi; Lucas Claerbout; Lucas Corvee; Ronan Labar; Thom Gicquel; Thomas Rouxel; Toma Junior Popov
Women's Team	Denmark; Christinna Pedersen; Julie Dawall Jakobsen; Julie Finne-Ipsen; Kamilla Rytter Juhl; Line Kjærsfeldt; Maiken Fruergaard; Mia Blichfeldt; Natalia Koch Rohde; Rikke Søby Hansen; Sara Thygesen; Sofie Holmboe Dahl	Germany; Carla Nelte; Fabienne Deprez; Isabel Herttrich; Johanna Goliszewski; Lara Käpplein; Linda Efler; Luise Heim; Olga Konon; Yvonne Li	Russia; Alina Davletova; Anastasia Chervyakova; Anastasiia Pustinskaia; Anastasiia Semenova; Ekaterina Bolotova; Elena Komendrovskaja; Elizaveta Pyatina; Evgeniya Kosetskaya; Ksenia Evgenova; Natalia Perminova; Nina Vislova; Olga Morozova
Women's Team	Denmark; Christinna Pedersen; Julie Dawall Jakobsen; Julie Finne-Ipsen; Kamilla Rytter Juhl; Line Kjærsfeldt; Maiken Fruergaard; Mia Blichfeldt; Natalia Koch Rohde; Rikke Søby Hansen; Sara Thygesen; Sofie Holmboe Dahl	Germany; Carla Nelte; Fabienne Deprez; Isabel Herttrich; Johanna Goliszewski; Lara Käpplein; Linda Efler; Luise Heim; Olga Konon; Yvonne Li	Spain; Beatriz Corrales; Carolina Marin; Clara Azurmendi; Elena Fernández; Lorena Usle; Sara Penalver Pereira

== Tournament ==
The 2018 European Men's and Women's Team Badminton Championships officially crowned the best male and female national teams in Europe and at the same time worked as the European qualification event towards the 2018 Thomas & Uber Cup finals. 53 teams consisting of 29 men's team and 24 women's team entered the tournament.

=== Venue ===
This tournament was held at Gymnastics Center in Kazan, Russia.

=== Seeds ===
The defending Champions, Denmark, were top seeded for both men's and women's team, while the host country Russia were seeded four.

- Men's team
1. Denmark
2. England
3. Germany
4. Russia
5. France
6. Poland
7. Finland
- Women's team
1. Denmark
2. Spain
3. Germany
4. Russia
5. Bulgaria
6. England

=== Draw ===
The draw was held on 5 December 2017, at the Badminton Europe office in Brøndby, Denmark. The men's team group stage consisted of six groups with four teams in each and one group with five teams. The women's team group stage consisted of six groups with four teams in each.

- Men's team

Group 1	Group 2	Group 3	Group 4	Group 5	Group 6	Group 7
Denmark; Israel; Croatia; Ireland	England; Hungary; Slovakia; Greenland	Germany; Iceland; Luxembourg; Azerbaijan	Russia; Bulgaria; Spain; Belgium	France; Ukraine; Austria; Lithuania	Poland; Italy; Portugal; Czech Republic	Finland; Estonia; Norway; Turkey; Latvia

- Women's team

Group 1	Group 2	Group 3	Group 4	Group 5	Group 6
Denmark; Sweden; Israel; Iceland	Spain; Hungary; Portugal; Slovakia	Germany; Lithuania; Ukraine; Ireland	Russia; Turkey; Estonia; Latvia	Bulgaria; France; Greenland; Belarus	England; Norway; Czech Republic; Poland

== Men's team ==
=== Format ===
In each group, teams played each other once. The seven group winners and the best runners-up qualified for the knockout stage.

=== Groups ===
All times are Kazan Standard Time (UTC+03:00).

==== Group 1 ====
Pos	Team	Pld	W	L	MF	MA	MD	GF	GA	GD	PF	PA	PD	Pts	Qualification
1	Denmark	3	3	0	14	1	+13	28	0	+28	595	333	+262	3	Knockout stage
2	Ireland	3	2	1	10	5	+5	19	10	+9	528	478	+50	2	
3	Croatia	3	1	2	4	11	−7	9	24	−15	503	630	−127	1	
4	Israel	3	0	3	2	13	−11	5	27	−22	459	644	−185	0	

Source: TS
- Denmark vs. Israel

Denmark
5
Gymnastic Centre Kazan, Court 3
13 February 2018 18:00

Israel
0

			1	2	3
1	(Denmark) (Israel)	Emil Holst; Misha Zilberman	21; 17	21; 13
2	(Denmark) (Israel)	Rasmus Gemke; Daniel Chislov	21; 11	21; 15
3	(Denmark) (Israel)	Jan Ø. Jørgensen; Maxim Grinblat	21; 4	21; 12
4	(Denmark) (Israel)	Kim Astrup / Anders Skaarup Rasmussen; Daniel Chislov / Ariel Shainski	21; 18	21; 14
5	(Denmark) (Israel)	Mads Conrad-Petersen / Mads Pieler Kolding; Maxim Grinblat / Yonathan Levit	21; 4	21; 5

- Croatia vs. Ireland

Croatia
1
Gymnastic Centre Kazan, Court 4
13 February 2018 18:00

Ireland
4

			1	2	3
1	(Croatia) (Republic of Ireland)	Filip Špoljarec; Scott Evans	18; 21	14; 21
2	(Croatia) (Republic of Ireland)	Josip Uglešić; Nguyễn Nhật	11; 21	13; 21
3	(Croatia) (Republic of Ireland)	Igor Čimbur; Joshua Magee	9; 21	11; 21
4	(Croatia) (Republic of Ireland)	Filip Špoljarec / Josip Uglesic; Scott Evans / Nguyễn Nhật	13; 21	13; 21
5	(Croatia) (Republic of Ireland)	Igor Čimbur / Zvonimir Hölbling; Joshua Magee / Paul Reynolds	17; 21	21; 14	21; 13

- Denmark vs. Croatia

Denmark
5
Gymnastic Centre Kazan, Court 6
14 February 2018 12:00

Croatia
0

			1	2	3
1	(Denmark) (Croatia)	Emil Holst; Filip Špoljarec	25; 23	21; 11
2	(Denmark) (Croatia)	Rasmus Gemke; Josip Uglešić	21; 15	21; 13
3	(Denmark) (Croatia)	Jan Ø. Jørgensen; Zvonimir Hölbling	21; 6	21; 16
4	(Denmark) (Croatia)	Mathias Christiansen / Mads Pieler Kolding; Filip Špoljarec / Josip Uglesic	21; 9	21; 7
5	(Denmark) (Croatia)	Kim Astrup / Anders Skaarup Rasmussen; Igor Čimbur / Zvonimir Hölbling	21; 14	21; 9

- Israel vs. Ireland

Israel
0
Gymnastic Centre Kazan, Court 2
14 February 2018 16:00

Ireland
5

			1	2	3
1	(Israel) (Republic of Ireland)	Misha Zilberman; Scott Evans	24; 26	18; 21
2	(Israel) (Republic of Ireland)	Daniel Chislov; Nguyễn Nhật	15; 21	10; 21
3	(Israel) (Republic of Ireland)	Maxim Grinblat; Joshua Magee	10; 21	9; 21
4	(Israel) (Republic of Ireland)	Yonathan Levit / Ariel Shainski; Sam Magee / Nguyễn Nhật	13; 21	16; 21
5	(Israel) (Republic of Ireland)	Daniel Chislov / Misha Zilberman; Joshua Magee / Paul Reynolds	18; 21	13; 21

- Denmark vs. Ireland

Denmark
4
Gymnastic Centre Kazan, Court 6
15 February 2018 10:00

Ireland
1

			1	2	3
1	(Denmark) (Republic of Ireland)	Anders Antonsen; Scott Evans	22; 20	21; 15
2	(Denmark) (Republic of Ireland)	Emil Holst; Nguyễn Nhật	2; 2			retired
3	(Denmark) (Republic of Ireland)	Jan Ø. Jørgensen; Joshua Magee	21; 5	21; 12
4	(Denmark) (Republic of Ireland)	Kim Astrup / Mathias Christiansen; Scott Evans / Sam Magee	21; 11	21; 11
5	(Denmark) (Republic of Ireland)	Mads Conrad-Petersen / Mads Pieler Kolding; Joshua Magee / Paul Reynolds	21; 7	21; 14

- Israel vs. Croatia

Israel
2
Gymnastic Centre Kazan, Court 7
15 February 2018 10:00

Croatia
3

			1	2	3
1	(Israel) (Croatia)	Misha Zilberman; Zvonimir Đurkinjak	11; 4			retired
2	(Israel) (Croatia)	Daniel Chislov; Filip Špoljarec	11; 21	21; 16	21; 16
3	(Israel) (Croatia)	Ariel Shainski; Josip Uglešić	19; 21	22; 20	12; 21
4	(Israel) (Croatia)	Maxim Grinblat / Yonathan Levit; Zvonimir Hölbling / Josip Uglesic	12; 21	14; 21
5	(Israel) (Croatia)	Daniel Chislov / Ariel Shainski; Igor Čimbur / Filip Špoljarec	23; 25	21; 12	13; 21

==== Group 2 ====
Pos	Team	Pld	W	L	MF	MA	MD	GF	GA	GD	PF	PA	PD	Pts	Qualification
1	England	3	3	0	15	0	+15	28	0	+28	588	307	+281	3	Knockout stage
2	Hungary	3	2	1	8	7	+1	17	17	0	601	585	+16	2	
3	Slovakia	3	1	2	6	9	−3	14	18	−4	546	566	−20	1	
4	Greenland	3	0	3	1	14	−13	4	28	−24	379	656	−277	0	

Source: TS
- England vs. Hungary

England
5
Gymnastic Centre Kazan, Court 6
13 February 2018 18:00

Hungary
0

			1	2	3
1	(England) (Hungary)	Rajiv Ouseph; Gergely Krausz	21; 17	21; 11
2	(England) (Hungary)	Sam Parsons; Gergo Pytel	21; 13	21; 15
3	(England) (Hungary)	Ben Lane / Sean Vendy; Levente Csiszer / Pal Padar	21; 9	21; 16
4	(England) (Hungary)	David Jones; Marton Szerecz	21; 17	21; 9
5	(England) (Hungary)	Marcus Ellis / Chris Langridge; Gergely Krausz / Gergo Pytel	21; 13	21; 8

- Slovakia vs. Greenland

Slovakia
5
Gymnastic Centre Kazan, Court 5
13 February 2018 18:00

Greenland
0

			1	2	3
1	(Slovakia) (Greenland)	Milan Dratva; Taatsiannguaq Pedersen	21; 9	21; 13
2	(Slovakia) (Greenland)	Juraj Vachalek; Jens-Frederik Nielsen	21; 15	21; 17
3	(Slovakia) (Greenland)	Andrej Antoska; Toke Ketwa-Driefer	21; 7	21; 11
4	(Slovakia) (Greenland)	Miroslav Haring / Juraj Vachalek; Bror Madsen / Taatsiannguaq Pedersen	21; 11	18; 21	21; 16
5	(Slovakia) (Greenland)	Andrej Antoska / Milan Dratva; Toke Ketwa-Driefer / Jens-Frederik Nielsen	21; 16	21; 7

- England vs. Slovakia

England
5
Gymnastic Centre Kazan, Court 3
14 February 2018 12:00

Slovakia
0

			1	2	3
1	(England) (Slovakia)	Rajiv Ouseph; Milan Dratva	21; 17	21; 13
2	(England) (Slovakia)	Sam Parsons; Juraj Vachalek	21; 10	21; 6
3	(England) (Slovakia)	David Jones; Andrej Antoska	21; 10	21; 11
4	(England) (Slovakia)	Marcus Ellis / Chris Langridge; Miroslav Haring / Juraj Vachalek	21; 12	21; 7
5	(England) (Slovakia)	Peter Briggs / Sean Vendy; Andrej Antoska / Milan Dratva				w/o

- Hungary vs. Greenland

Hungary
4
Gymnastic Centre Kazan, Court 4
14 February 2018 16:00

Greenland
1

			1	2	3
1	(Hungary) (Greenland)	Gergely Krausz; Taatsiannguaq Pedersen	21; 5	21; 6
2	(Hungary) (Greenland)	Gergo Pytel; Jens-Frederik Nielsen	21; 18	15; 21	21; 7
3	(Hungary) (Greenland)	Marton Szerecz; Toke Ketwa-Driefer	21; 8	21; 10
4	(Hungary) (Greenland)	Gergely Krausz / Gergo Pytel; Bror Madsen / Taatsiannguaq Pedersen	21; 8	21; 17
5	(Hungary) (Greenland)	Levente Csiszer / Pal Padar; Toke Ketwa-Driefer / Jens-Frederik Nielsen	15; 21	20; 22

- England vs. Greenland

England
5
Gymnastic Centre Kazan, Court 6
15 February 2018 18:00

Greenland
0

			1	2	3
1	(England) (Greenland)	Rajiv Ouseph; Taatsiannguaq Pedersen	21; 8	21; 8
2	(England) (Greenland)	Sam Parsons; Jens-Frederik Nielsen	21; 12	21; 6
3	(England) (Greenland)	David Jones; Toke Ketwa-Driefer	21; 4	21; 11
4	(England) (Greenland)	Marcus Ellis / Chris Langridge; Bror Madsen / Taatsiannguaq Pedersen	21; 12	21; 11
5	(England) (Greenland)	Peter Briggs / Tom Wolfenden; Toke Ketwa-Driefer / Jens-Frederik Nielsen	21; 10	21; 11

- Hungary vs. Slovakia

Hungary
4
Gymnastic Centre Kazan, Court 7
15 February 2018 18:00

Slovakia
1

			1	2	3
1	(Hungary) (Slovakia)	Gergely Krausz; Matej Hlinican	21; 17	21; 9
2	(Hungary) (Slovakia)	Marton Szerecz; Milan Dratva	21; 16	14; 21	13; 21
3	(Hungary) (Slovakia)	Henrik Toth; Juraj Vachalek	20; 22	25; 23	21; 19
4	(Hungary) (Slovakia)	Gergely Krausz / Gergo Pytel; Milan Dratva / Matej Hlinican	21; 16	21; 14
5	(Hungary) (Slovakia)	Levente Csiszer / Pal Padar; Miroslav Haring / Juraj Vachalek	21; 19	15; 21	21; 14

==== Group 3 ====
Pos	Team	Pld	W	L	MF	MA	MD	GF	GA	GD	PF	PA	PD	Pts	Qualification
1	Germany	3	3	0	15	0	+15	30	0	+30	630	252	+378	3	Knockout stage
2	Iceland	3	2	1	8	7	+1	17	15	+2	527	530	−3	2	
3	Luxembourg	3	1	2	5	10	−5	11	24	−13	525	658	−133	1	
4	Azerbaijan	3	0	3	2	13	−11	7	26	−19	410	652	−242	0	

Source: TS
- Germany vs. Iceland

Germany
5
Gymnastic Centre Kazan, Court 6
13 February 2018 10:00

Iceland
0

			1	2	3
1	(Germany) (Iceland)	Marc Zwiebler; Kári Gunnarsson	21; 10	21; 10
2	(Germany) (Iceland)	Peter Käsbauer / Max Weißkirchen; David Bjarni Bjornsson / Kristoffer Darri Finnsson	21; 7	21; 12
3	(Germany) (Iceland)	Alexander Roovers; Daniel Johannesson	21; 9	21; 6
4	(Germany) (Iceland)	Jones Ralfy Jansen / Josche Zurwonne; Kári Gunnarsson / Daniel Johannesson	21; 14	21; 7
5	(Germany) (Iceland)	Kai Schäfer; Kristoffer Darri Finnsson	21; 11	21; 7

- Luxembourg vs. Azerbaijan

Luxembourg
4
Gymnastic Centre Kazan, Court 5
13 February 2018 10:00

Azerbaijan
1

			1	2	3
1	(Luxembourg) (Azerbaijan)	Robert Mann; Orkhan Galandarov	18; 21	21; 12	21; 16
2	(Luxembourg) (Azerbaijan)	Mattias Sonderskov; Kanan Rzayev	5; 21	21; 17	21; 19
3	(Luxembourg) (Azerbaijan)	Juno Thomas; Azmy Qowimuramadhoni	16; 21	17; 21
4	(Luxembourg) (Azerbaijan)	Mattias Sonderskov / Juno Thomas; Orkhan Galandarov / Kanan Rzayev	24; 22	17; 21	21; 12
5	(Luxembourg) (Azerbaijan)	Maxime Szturma / Mike Vallenthini; Jahid Alhasanov / Azmy Qowimuramadhoni	21; 7	21; 12

- Germany vs. Luxembourg

Germany
5
Gymnastic Centre Kazan, Court 9
14 February 2018 12:00

Luxembourg
0

			1	2	3
1	(Germany) (Luxembourg)	Kai Schäfer; Robert Mann	21; 10	21; 9
2	(Germany) (Luxembourg)	Lars Schänzler; Mattias Sonderskov	21; 8	21; 5
3	(Germany) (Luxembourg)	Max Weißkirchen; Mike Vallenthini	21; 12	21; 7
4	(Germany) (Luxembourg)	Jones Ralfy Jansen / Josche Zurwonne; Mattias Sonderskov / Juno Thomas	21; 7	21; 5
5	(Germany) (Luxembourg)	Marvin Seidel / Marc Zwiebler; Maxime Szturma / Mike Vallenthini	21; 10	21; 16

- Iceland vs. Azerbaijan

Iceland
4
Gymnastic Centre Kazan, Court 6
14 February 2018 16:00

Azerbaijan
1

			1	2	3
1	(Iceland) (Azerbaijan)	Kári Gunnarsson; Sabuhi Huseynov	21; 9	21; 2
2	(Iceland) (Azerbaijan)	Kristoffer Darri Finnsson; Jahid Alhasanov	21; 12	21; 11
3	(Iceland) (Azerbaijan)	Daniel Johannesson; Azmy Qowimuramadhoni	12; 21	18; 21
4	(Iceland) (Azerbaijan)	Kári Gunnarsson / Daniel Johannesson; Jahid Alhasanov / Sabuhi Huseynov	21; 12	21; 12
5	(Iceland) (Azerbaijan)	David Bjarni Bjornsson / Kristoffer Darri Finnsson; Azmy Qowimuramadhoni / Kanan Rzayev	21; 12	21; 16

- Germany vs. Azerbaijan

Germany
5
Gymnastic Centre Kazan, Court 3
15 February 2018 10:00

Azerbaijan
0

			1	2	3
1	(Germany) (Azerbaijan)	Marc Zwiebler; Sabuhi Huseynov	21; 7	21; 6
2	(Germany) (Azerbaijan)	Lars Schänzler; Jahid Alhasanov	21; 4	21; 4
3	(Germany) (Azerbaijan)	Max Weißkirchen; Azmy Qowimuramadhoni	21; 16	21; 7
4	(Germany) (Azerbaijan)	Jones Ralfy Jansen / Josche Zurwonne; Jahid Alhasanov / Sabuhi Huseynov	21; 6	21; 6
5	(Germany) (Azerbaijan)	Mark Lamsfuß / Marvin Seidel; Azmy Qowimuramadhoni / Kanan Rzayev	21; 11	21; 3

- Iceland vs. Luxembourg

Iceland
4
Gymnastic Centre Kazan, Court 9
15 February 2018 10:00

Luxembourg
1

			1	2	3
1	(Iceland) (Luxembourg)	Kári Gunnarsson; Robert Mann	21; 6	23; 21
2	(Iceland) (Luxembourg)	Kristoffer Darri Finnsson; Mattias Sonderskov	21; 16	21; 13
3	(Iceland) (Luxembourg)	Daniel Johannesson; Juno Thomas	7; 21	21; 16	22; 24
4	(Iceland) (Luxembourg)	David Bjarni Bjornsson / Kristoffer Darri Finnsson; Maxime Szturma / Mike Vallenthini	16; 21	21; 18	21; 15
5	(Iceland) (Luxembourg)	Kári Gunnarsson / Daniel Johannesson; Mattias Sonderskov / Juno Thomas	21; 14	21; 7

==== Group 4 ====
Pos	Team	Pld	W	L	MF	MA	MD	GF	GA	GD	PF	PA	PD	Pts	Qualification
1	Russia	3	3	0	13	2	+11	24	8	+16	635	491	+144	3	Knockout stage
2	Bulgaria	3	2	1	8	7	+1	18	16	+2	577	607	−30	2	
3	Spain	3	1	2	7	8	−1	17	15	+2	597	551	+46	1	
4	Belgium	3	0	3	2	13	−11	6	26	−20	472	632	−160	0	

Source: TS
- Russia vs. Bulgaria

Russia
4
Gymnastic Centre Kazan, Court 3
13 February 2018 13:30

Bulgaria
1

			1	2	3
1	(Russia) (Bulgaria)	Vladimir Malkov; Ivan Rusev	21; 12	20; 22	21; 10
2	(Russia) (Bulgaria)	Sergey Sirant; Daniel Nikolov	10; 21	21; 19	21; 18
3	(Russia) (Bulgaria)	Konstantin Abramov / Alexandr Zinchenko; Peyo Boichinov / Ivan Panev	21; 8	21; 12
4	(Russia) (Bulgaria)	Anatoliy Yartsev; Dimitar Yanakiev	21; 14	19; 21	16; 21
5	(Russia) (Bulgaria)	Vladimir Ivanov / Ivan Sozonov; Daniel Nikolov / Ivan Rusev	21; 8	21; 13

- Spain vs. Belgium

Spain
4
Gymnastic Centre Kazan, Court 2
13 February 2018 13:30

Belgium
1

			1	2	3
1	(Spain) (Belgium)	Pablo Abián; Birger Abts	21; 15	21; 16
2	(Spain) (Belgium)	Luís Enrique Peñalver; Elias Bracke	21; 11	21; 8
3	(Spain) (Belgium)	Pablo Abián / Alberto Zapico; Matijs Dierickx / Freek Golinski	21; 18	18; 21	19; 21
4	(Spain) (Belgium)	Manuel Vázquez; Guillaume Bonnet	21; 9	21; 11
5	(Spain) (Belgium)	Luís Enrique Peñalver / Javier Suárez; Birger Abts / Elias Bracke	21; 13	18; 21	21; 16

- Russia vs. Spain

Russia
4
Gymnastic Centre Kazan, Court 1
14 February 2018 19:00

Spain
1

			1	2	3
1	(Russia) (Spain)	Vladimir Malkov; Pablo Abián	17; 18			retired
2	(Russia) (Spain)	Sergey Sirant; Luís Enrique Peñalver	12; 21	21; 18	18; 21
3	(Russia) (Spain)	Vladimir Ivanov; Manuel Vázquez	21; 14	21; 14
4	(Russia) (Spain)	Konstantin Abramov / Alexandr Zinchenko; Pablo Abián / Luís Enrique Peñalver				w/o
5	(Russia) (Spain)	Vladimir Ivanov / Ivan Sozonov; Javier Suárez / Alberto Zapico	21; 11	21; 11

- Bulgaria vs. Belgium

Bulgaria
4
Gymnastic Centre Kazan, Court 2
14 February 2018 19:00

Belgium
1

			1	2	3
1	(Bulgaria) (Belgium)	Ivan Rusev; Maxime Moreels	2; 0			retired
2	(Bulgaria) (Belgium)	Daniel Nikolov; Birger Abts	21; 8	21; 17
3	(Bulgaria) (Belgium)	Dimitar Yanakiev; Elias Bracke	21; 14	21; 10
4	(Bulgaria) (Belgium)	Daniel Nikolov / Ivan Rusev; Matijs Dierickx / Freek Golinski	17; 21	14; 21
5	(Bulgaria) (Belgium)	Peyo Boichinov / Ivan Panev; Birger Abts / Elias Bracke	21; 18	21; 19

- Russia vs. Belgium

Russia
5
Gymnastic Centre Kazan, Court 3
15 February 2018 18:00

Belgium
0

			1	2	3
1	(Russia) (Belgium)	Sergey Sirant; Birger Abts	21; 17	21; 17
2	(Russia) (Belgium)	Anatoliy Yartsev; Elias Bracke	21; 18	21; 19
3	(Russia) (Belgium)	Rodion Alimov / Rodion Kargaev; Birger Abts / Matijs Dierickx	21; 16	19; 21	21; 11
4	(Russia) (Belgium)	Shokhzod Gulomzoda; Guillaume Bonnet	21; 7	21; 15
5	(Russia) (Belgium)	Vladimir Ivanov / Ivan Sozonov; Elias Bracke / Freek Golinski	21; 9	21; 14

- Bulgaria vs. Spain

Bulgaria
3
Gymnastic Centre Kazan, Court 1
15 February 2018 18:00

Spain
2

			1	2	3
1	(Bulgaria) (Spain)	Ivan Rusev; Luís Enrique Peñalver	8; 21	14; 21
2	(Bulgaria) (Spain)	Daniel Nikolov; Manuel Vázquez	21; 15	22; 20
3	(Bulgaria) (Spain)	Dimitar Yanakiev; Alvaro Vázquez	21; 14	21; 16
4	(Bulgaria) (Spain)	Daniel Nikolov / Ivan Rusev; Javier Suárez / Alberto Zapico	16; 21	21; 19	21; 17
5	(Bulgaria) (Spain)	Peyo Boichinov / Ivan Panev; Luís Enrique Peñalver / Manuel Vázquez	17; 21	21; 19	16; 21

==== Group 5 ====
Pos	Team	Pld	W	L	MF	MA	MD	GF	GA	GD	PF	PA	PD	Pts	Qualification
1	France	3	3	0	15	0	+15	30	0	+30	631	327	+304	3	Knockout stage
2	Ukraine	3	2	1	9	6	+3	19	12	+7	551	490	+61	2	
3	Austria	3	1	2	5	10	−5	11	21	−10	513	596	−83	1	
4	Lithuania	3	0	3	1	14	−13	2	29	−27	365	647	−282	0	

Source: TS
- France vs. Ukraine

France
5
Gymnastic Centre Kazan, Court 1
13 February 2018 13:30

Ukraine
0

			1	2	3
1	(France) (Ukraine)	Brice Leverdez; Artem Pochtarev	21; 11	21; 14
2	(France) (Ukraine)	Lucas Corvée; Valeriy Atrashchenkov	21; 15	21; 10
3	(France) (Ukraine)	Lucas Claerbout; Dmytro Zavadsky	21; 11	21; 7
4	(France) (Ukraine)	Thom Gicquel / Gaëtan Mittelheisser; Valeriy Atrashchenkov / Vladislav Druzchenko	21; 15	21; 10
5	(France) (Ukraine)	Bastian Kersaudy / Julien Maio; Artem Pochtarev / Dmytro Zavadsky	22; 20	21; 9

- Austria vs. Lithuania

Austria
4
Gymnastic Centre Kazan, Court 7
13 February 2018 18:00

Lithuania
1

			1	2	3
1	(Austria) (Lithuania)	Michael Giesinger; Mark Sames	21; 11	17; 21	21; 23
2	(Austria) (Lithuania)	Leon Seiwald; Ignas Reznikas	21; 9	21; 13
3	(Austria) (Lithuania)	Philipp Drexler; Edgaras Slusnys	21; 17	21; 11
4	(Austria) (Lithuania)	Philip Birker / Leon Seiwald; Jonas Petkus / Mark Sames	21; 15	21; 16
5	(Austria) (Lithuania)	Jakob Sorger / Roman Zirnwald; Ignas Reznikas / Edgaras Slusnys	21; 18	21; 13

- Ukraine vs. Lithuania

Ukraine
5
Gymnastic Centre Kazan, Court 8
14 February 2018 16:00

Lithuania
0

			1	2	3
1	(Ukraine) (Lithuania)	Artem Pochtarev; Mark Sames	21; 13	21; 12
2	(Ukraine) (Lithuania)	Kyrylo Leonov; Jonas Petkus	21; 12	21; 7
3	(Ukraine) (Lithuania)	Danylo Bosniuk; Ignas Reznikas	21; 5	21; 9
4	(Ukraine) (Lithuania)	Valeriy Atrashchenkov / Dmytro Zavadsky; Jonas Petkus / Mark Sames	21; 10	21; 13
5	(Ukraine) (Lithuania)	Danylo Bosniuk / Vladislav Druzchenko; Ignas Reznikas / Edgaras Slusnys	21; 12	21; 19

- France vs. Austria

France
5
Gymnastic Centre Kazan, Court 7
14 February 2018 19:00

Austria
0

			1	2	3
1	(France) (Austria)	Brice Leverdez; Michael Giesinger	21; 14	21; 10
2	(France) (Austria)	Bastian Kersaudy / Julien Maio; Jakob Sorger / Roman Zirnwald	21; 7	21; 13
3	(France) (Austria)	Thomas Rouxel; Leon Seiwald	21; 18	21; 13
4	(France) (Austria)	Thom Gicquel / Gaëtan Mittelheisser; Philip Birker / Michael Giesinger	21; 13	21; 12
5	(France) (Austria)	Toma Junior Popov; Philipp Drexler	21; 9	21; 10

- France vs. Lithuania

France
5
Gymnastic Centre Kazan, Court 9
15 February 2018 18:00

Lithuania
0

			1	2	3
1	(France) (Lithuania)	Lucas Corvee; Mark Sames	21; 6	21; 9
2	(France) (Lithuania)	Lucas Claerbout; Jonas Petkus	21; 10	21; 3
3	(France) (Lithuania)	Thomas Rouxel; Edgaras Slusnys	21; 5	21; 12
4	(France) (Lithuania)	Thom Gicquel / Toma Junior Popov; Jonas Petkus / Mark Sames	21; 9	21; 13
5	(France) (Lithuania)	Bastian Kersaudy / Julien Maio; Ignas Reznikas / Edgaras Slusnys	21; 5	21; 14

- Ukraine vs. Austria

Ukraine
4
Gymnastic Centre Kazan, Court 8
15 February 2018 18:00

Austria
1

			1	2	3
1	(Ukraine) (Austria)	Artem Pochtarev; Michael Giesinger	21; 16	21; 15
2	(Ukraine) (Austria)	Kyrylo Leonov; Leon Seiwald	21; 13	21; 11
3	(Ukraine) (Austria)	Dmytro Zavadsky; Philipp Drexler	21; 16	21; 4
4	(Ukraine) (Austria)	Valeriy Atrashchenkov / Danylo Bosniuk; Jakob Sorger / Roman Zirnwald	17; 21	21; 18	13; 21
5	(Ukraine) (Austria)	Artem Pochtarev / Dmytro Zavadsky; Philip Birker / Dominik Stipsits	21; 17	21; 15

==== Group 6 ====
Pos	Team	Pld	W	L	MF	MA	MD	GF	GA	GD	PF	PA	PD	Pts	Qualification
1	Poland	3	3	0	13	2	+11	27	7	+20	676	528	+148	3	Knockout stage
2	Czech Republic	3	2	1	11	4	+7	23	12	+11	666	604	+62	2	Knockout stage
3	Italy	3	1	2	3	12	−9	11	26	−15	612	719	−107	1	
4	Portugal	3	0	3	3	12	−9	11	27	−16	633	736	−103	0	

Source: TS
- Portugal vs. Czech Republic

Portugal
0
Gymnastic Centre Kazan, Court 4
13 February 2018 13:30

Czech Republic
5

			1	2	3
1	(Portugal) (Czech Republic)	Duarte Nuno Anjo; Adam Mendrek	21; 15	14; 21	17; 21
2	(Portugal) (Czech Republic)	Bernardo Atilano; Milan Ludík	21; 14	14; 21	21; 23
3	(Portugal) (Czech Republic)	Bruno Carvalho; Jan Louda	17; 21	17; 21
4	(Portugal) (Czech Republic)	Bruno Carvalho / Tomas Nero; Jakub Bitman / Adam Mendrek	22; 20	19; 21	19; 21
5	(Portugal) (Czech Republic)	Duarte Nuno Anjo / Bernardo Atilano; Ondřej Král / Jan Louda	10; 21	13; 21

- Poland vs. Italy

Poland
5
Gymnastic Centre Kazan, Court 9
13 February 2018 18:00

Italy
0

			1	2	3
1	(Poland) (Italy)	Michał Rogalski; Rosario Maddaloni	21; 15	18; 21	21; 14
2	(Poland) (Italy)	Adrian Dziółko; Giovanni Greco	21; 13	21; 15
3	(Poland) (Italy)	Miłosz Bochat / Adam Cwalina; Lukas Osele / Kevin Strobl	21; 8	21; 14
4	(Poland) (Italy)	Krzysztof Jakowczuk; Fabio Caponio	21; 16	21; 17
5	(Poland) (Italy)	Paweł Śmiłowski / Przemysław Szydłowski; Giovanni Greco / Rosario Maddaloni	18; 21	21; 15	21; 19

- Poland vs. Portugal

Poland
4
Gymnastic Centre Kazan, Court 5
14 February 2018 12:00

Portugal
1

			1	2	3
1	(Poland) (Portugal)	Michał Rogalski; Duarte Nuno Anjo	21; 8	21; 12
2	(Poland) (Portugal)	Adrian Dziółko; Bernardo Atilano	21; 17	21; 18
3	(Poland) (Portugal)	Mateusz Danielak; Bruno Carvalho	21; 18	16; 21	13; 21
4	(Poland) (Portugal)	Paweł Śmiłowski / Przemysław Szydłowski; Duarte Nuno Anjo / Bernardo Atilano	21; 16	21; 7
5	(Poland) (Portugal)	Miłosz Bochat / Adam Cwalina; Bruno Carvalho / Tomas Nero	21; 14	21; 10

- Italy vs. Czech Republic

Italy
0
Gymnastic Centre Kazan, Court 2
14 February 2018 12:00

Czech Republic
5

			1	2	3
1	(Italy) (Czech Republic)	Rosario Maddaloni; Adam Mendrek	21; 16	14; 21	17; 21
2	(Italy) (Czech Republic)	Giovanni Greco; Milan Ludík	17; 21	20; 22
3	(Italy) (Czech Republic)	Fabio Caponio; Ondřej Král	10; 21	10; 21
4	(Italy) (Czech Republic)	Lukas Osele / Kevin Strobl; Jakub Bitman / Adam Mendrek	17; 21	17; 21
5	(Italy) (Czech Republic)	Giovanni Greco / Rosario Maddaloni; Ondřej Král / Jan Louda	12; 21	12; 21

- Poland vs. Czech Republic

Poland
4
Gymnastic Centre Kazan, Court 1
15 February 2018 10:00

Czech Republic
1

			1	2	3
1	(Poland) (Czech Republic)	Michał Rogalski; Adam Mendrek	21; 18	21; 13
2	(Poland) (Czech Republic)	Adrian Dziółko; Milan Ludík	15; 21	21; 18	21; 17
3	(Poland) (Czech Republic)	Krzysztof Jakowczuk; Jan Louda	15; 21	14; 21
4	(Poland) (Czech Republic)	Miłosz Bochat / Przemysław Szydłowski; Ondřej Král / Milan Ludík	21; 8	21; 10
5	(Poland) (Czech Republic)	Adam Cwalina / Paweł Śmiłowski; Jakub Bitman / Jan Louda	21; 17	21; 14

- Italy vs. Portugal

Italy
3
Gymnastic Centre Kazan, Court 2
15 February 2018 10:00

Portugal
2

			1	2	3
1	(Italy) (Portugal)	Rosario Maddaloni; Duarte Nuno Anjo	21; 18	21; 6
2	(Italy) (Portugal)	Giovanni Greco; Bernardo Atilano	21; 11	9; 21	22; 20
3	(Italy) (Portugal)	Fabio Caponio; Bruno Carvalho	21; 9	17; 21	13; 21
4	(Italy) (Portugal)	Giovanni Greco / Rosario Maddaloni; Duarte Nuno Anjo / Bernardo Atilano	19; 17	21; 21	23; 21
5	(Italy) (Portugal)	Lukas Osele / Kevin Strobl; Bruno Carvalho / Tomas Nero	14; 21	21; 18	14; 21

==== Group 7 ====
Pos	Team	Pld	W	L	MF	MA	MD	GF	GA	GD	PF	PA	PD	Pts	Qualification
1	Finland	4	4	0	19	1	+18	39	5	+34	918	603	+315	4	Knockout stage
2	Turkey	4	3	1	13	7	+6	28	16	+12	814	686	+128	3	
3	Estonia	4	2	2	12	8	+4	27	20	+7	852	816	+36	2	
4	Norway	4	1	3	6	14	−8	14	28	−14	681	788	−107	1	
5	Latvia	4	0	4	0	20	−20	1	40	−39	491	861	−370	0	

Source: TS
- Finland vs. Estonia

Finland
5
Gymnastic Centre Kazan, Court 9
13 February 2018 13:30

Estonia
0

			1	2	3
1	(Finland) (Estonia)	Kalle Koljonen; Raul Must	21; 15	21; 15
2	(Finland) (Estonia)	Iikka Heino; Mihkel Laanes	19; 21	21; 13	21; 10
3	(Finland) (Estonia)	Henri Aarnio; Rainer Kaljumäe	21; 17	21; 18
4	(Finland) (Estonia)	Anton Kaisti / Oskari Larkimo; Mikk Ounmaa / Heiko Zoober	21; 15	21; 10
5	(Finland) (Estonia)	Henri Aarnio / Iikka Heino; Kristjan Kaljurand / Raul Käsner	20; 22	21; 18	19; 21

- Norway vs. Turkey

Norway
0
Gymnastic Centre Kazan, Court 5
13 February 2018 13:30

Turkey
5

			1	2	3
1	(Norway) (Turkey)	Peter Roenn Stensaeth; Emre Lale	12; 21	16; 21
2	(Norway) (Turkey)	Torjus Flaatten; Muhammed Ali Kurt	6; 21	14; 21
3	(Norway) (Turkey)	Carl Christian Mork / Peter Roenn Stensaeth; Serdar Koca / Serhat Salim	11; 21	17; 21
4	(Norway) (Turkey)	Vegard Rikheim; Enis Sesalan	11; 21	11; 21
5	(Norway) (Turkey)	Magnus Christensen / Fredrik Kristensen; Muhammed Ali Kurt / Emre Lale	16; 21	15; 21

- Finland vs. Norway

Finland
5
Gymnastic Centre Kazan, Court 2
14 February 2018 09:00

Norway
0

			1	2	3
1	(Finland) (Norway)	Kalle Koljonen; Peter Roenn Stensaeth	21; 17	21; 11
2	(Finland) (Norway)	Iikka Heino; Torjus Flaatten	21; 11	21; 12
3	(Finland) (Norway)	Henri Aarnio; Vegard Rikheim	21; 17	24; 22
4	(Finland) (Norway)	Anton Kaisti / Oskari Larkimo; Carl Christian Mork / Peter Roenn Stensaeth	21; 9	22; 20
5	(Finland) (Norway)	Henri Aarnio / Kalle Koljonen; Magnus Christensen / Fredrik Kristensen	19; 21	21; 13	21; 16

- Estonia vs. Latvia

Estonia
5
Gymnastic Centre Kazan, Court 5
14 February 2018 09:00

Latvia
0

			1	2	3
1	(Estonia) (Latvia)	Raul Must; Niks Podosinoviks	21; 17	21; 18
2	(Estonia) (Latvia)	Kristjan Kaljurand / Raul Käsner; Pauls Gureckis / Toms Preinbergs	21; 13	21; 18
3	(Estonia) (Latvia)	Mihkel Laanes; Andis Berzins	21; 9	21; 13
4	(Estonia) (Latvia)	Mikk Ounmaa / Heiko Zoober; Niks Podosinoviks / Reinis Sefers	21; 7	21; 14
5	(Estonia) (Latvia)	Rainer Kaljumäe; Arturs Akmens	18; 21	21; 8	21; 18

- Finland vs. Turkey

Finland
5
Gymnastic Centre Kazan, Court 1
14 February 2018 16:00

Turkey
0

			1	2	3
1	(Finland) (Turkey)	Kalle Koljonen; Emre Lale	21; 16	21; 14
2	(Finland) (Turkey)	Iikka Heino; Muhammed Ali Kurt	21; 13	21; 13
3	(Finland) (Turkey)	Henri Aarnio; Enis Sesalan	21; 10	21; 10
4	(Finland) (Turkey)	Anton Kaisti / Oskari Larkimo; Serdar Koca / Serhat Salim	18; 21	21; 12	21; 19
5	(Finland) (Turkey)	Henri Aarnio / Iikka Heino; Muhammed Ali Kurt / Emre Lale	21; 12	21; 9

- Norway vs. Latvia

Norway
5
Gymnastic Centre Kazan, Court 9
14 February 2018 16:00

Latvia
0

			1	2	3
1	(Norway) (Latvia)	Peter Roenn Stensaeth; Niks Podosinoviks	24; 22	21; 13
2	(Norway) (Latvia)	Torjus Flaatten; Andis Berzins	21; 13	21; 9
3	(Norway) (Latvia)	Vegard Rikheim; Arturs Akmens	21; 6	21; 14
4	(Norway) (Latvia)	Magnus Christensen / Fredrik Kristensen; Pauls Gureckis / Toms Preinbergs	21; 12	21; 10
5	(Norway) (Latvia)	Carl Christian Mork / Vegard Rikheim; Niks Podosinoviks / Reinis Sefers	21; 15	21; 9

- Estonia vs. Norway

Estonia
4
Gymnastic Centre Kazan, Court 4
15 February 2018 10:00

Norway
1

			1	2	3
1	(Estonia) (Norway)	Raul Must; Peter Roenn Stensaeth	18; 21	21; 9	21; 10
2	(Estonia) (Norway)	Mihkel Laanes; Torjus Flaatten	21; 18	21; 11
3	(Estonia) (Norway)	Rainer Kaljumäe; Vegard Rikheim	19; 21	17; 21
4	(Estonia) (Norway)	Kristjan Kaljurand / Raul Käsner; Magnus Christensen / Fredrik Kristensen	21; 12	21; 10
5	(Estonia) (Norway)	Mikk Ounmaa / Heiko Zoober; Carl Christian Mork / Vegard Rikheim	21; 19	21; 18

- Turkey vs. Latvia

Turkey
5
Gymnastic Centre Kazan, Court 5
15 February 2018 10:00

Latvia
0

			1	2	3
1	(Turkey) (Latvia)	Emre Lale; Niks Podosinoviks	21; 15	21; 9
2	(Turkey) (Latvia)	Serdar Koca / Serhat Salim; Pauls Gureckis / Toms Preinbergs	21; 14	21; 9
3	(Turkey) (Latvia)	Muhammed Ali Kurt; Andis Berzins	21; 17	21; 12
4	(Turkey) (Latvia)	Mehmet Capar / Emre Sonmez; Niks Podosinoviks / Reinis Sefers	21; 12	21; 14
5	(Turkey) (Latvia)	Enis Sesalan; Viesturs Bajars	21; 14	21; 6

- Finland vs. Latvia

Finland
5
Gymnastic Centre Kazan, Court 5
15 February 2018 18:00

Latvia
0

			1	2	3
1	(Finland) (Latvia)	Iikka Heino; Niks Podosinoviks	21; 13	21; 14
2	(Finland) (Latvia)	Henri Aarnio; Ivo Keiss	21; 12	21; 7
3	(Finland) (Latvia)	Anton Kaisti; Arturs Akmens	21; 4	21; 9
4	(Finland) (Latvia)	Iikka Heino / Kalle Koljonen; Pauls Gureckis / Toms Preinbergs	21; 7	21; 4
5	(Finland) (Latvia)	Anton Kaisti / Oskari Larkimo; Niks Podosinoviks / Reinis Sefers	21; 11	21; 9

- Estonia vs. Turkey

Estonia
2
Gymnastic Centre Kazan, Court 2
15 February 2018 18:00

Turkey
3

			1	2	3
1	(Estonia) (Turkey)	Raul Must; Emre Lale	21; 19	16; 21	21; 15
2	(Estonia) (Turkey)	Kristjan Kaljurand / Raul Käsner; Serdar Koca / Serhat Salim	21; 11	21; 16
3	(Estonia) (Turkey)	Mihkel Laanes; Muhammed Ali Kurt	10; 21	10; 21
4	(Estonia) (Turkey)	Mikk Ounmaa / Heiko Zoober; Mehmet Capar / Emre Sonmez	21; 18	16; 21	11; 21
5	(Estonia) (Turkey)	Rainer Kaljumäe; Enis Sesalan	21; 19	8; 21	10; 21

=== Ranking of second-placed teams ===
Due to group 7 having different number of teams, the results against the fifth-placed teams are not considered for this ranking.

Pos	Grp	Team	Pld	W	L	MF	MA	MD	GF	GA	GD	PF	PA	PD	Pts	Qualification
1	6	Czech Republic	3	2	1	11	4	+7	23	12	+11	666	604	+62	2	Knockout stage
2	1	Ireland	3	2	1	10	5	+5	19	10	+9	528	478	+50	2	
3	5	Ukraine	3	2	1	9	6	+3	19	12	+7	551	490	+61	2	
4	7	Turkey	3	2	1	8	7	+1	18	16	+2	604	564	+40	2	
5	3	Iceland	3	2	1	8	7	+1	17	15	+2	527	530	−3	2	
6	4	Bulgaria	3	2	1	8	7	+1	18	16	+2	577	607	−30	2	
7	2	Hungary	3	2	1	8	7	+1	17	17	0	601	585	+16	2	

=== Knockout stage ===
Quarter-finals
16 February 2018
Denmark	3
Finland	0
16 February 2018
Germany	3
Czech Republic	1
16 February 2018
France	3
Russia	2
16 February 2018
Poland	0
England	3

Semi-finals
17 February 2018
Denmark	3
Germany	1
17 February 2018
France	1
England	3

Final
18 February 2018
Denmark	3
England	1

==== Quarterfinals ====
Denmark
3
Gymnastic Centre Kazan, Court 2
16 February 2018 13:00

Finland
0

			1	2	3
1	(Denmark) (Finland)	Anders Antonsen; Kalle Koljonen	19; 21	21; 16	21; 16
2	(Denmark) (Finland)	Emil Holst; Iikka Heino	21; 9	21; 11
3	(Denmark) (Finland)	Jan Ø. Jørgensen; Henri Aarnio	21; 11	23; 21
4	(Denmark) (Finland)	Kim Astrup / Mathias Christiansen; Anton Kaisti / Oskari Larkimo				not played
5	(Denmark) (Finland)	Mads Conrad-Petersen / Mads Pieler Kolding; Henri Aarnio / Iikka Heino				not played

Germany
3
Gymnastic Centre Kazan, Court 2
16 February 2018 15:00

Czech Republic
1

			1	2	3
1	(Germany) (Czech Republic)	Marc Zwiebler; Adam Mendrek	21; 13	21; 17
2	(Germany) (Czech Republic)	Kai Schäfer; Milan Ludík	21; 18	17; 21	21; 15
3	(Germany) (Czech Republic)	Max Weißkirchen; Jan Louda	19; 21	18; 21
4	(Germany) (Czech Republic)	Jones Ralfy Jansen / Josche Zurwonne; Ondřej Král / Milan Ludík	21; 17	21; 16
5	(Germany) (Czech Republic)	Mark Lamsfuß / Marvin Seidel; Jakub Bitman / Jan Louda				not played

France
3
Gymnastic Centre Kazan, Court 1
16 February 2018 14:00

Russia
2

			1	2	3
1	(France) (Russia)	Brice Leverdez; Vladimir Malkov	21; 15	21; 15
2	(France) (Russia)	Bastian Kersaudy / Julien Maio; Vladimir Ivanov / Alexandr Zinchenko	20; 22	7; 21
3	(France) (Russia)	Lucas Corvee; Sergey Sirant	21; 17	21; 17
4	(France) (Russia)	Thom Gicquel / Gaetan Mittelheisser; Rodion Alimov / Ivan Sozonov	9; 21	18; 21
5	(France) (Russia)	Lucas Claerbout; Shokhzod Gulomzoda	21; 15	21; 6

Poland
0
Gymnastic Centre Kazan, Court 3
16 February 2018 15:30

England
3

			1	2	3
1	(Poland) (England)	Michal Rogalski; Rajiv Ouseph	11; 21	14; 21
2	(Poland) (England)	Milosz Bochat / Adam Cwalina; Marcus Ellis / Chris Langridge	16; 21	13; 21
3	(Poland) (England)	Adrian Dziolko; Sam Parsons	21; 19	17; 21	16; 21
4	(Poland) (England)	Michal Rogalski / Pawel Smilowski; Peter Briggs / Sean Vendy				not played
5	(Poland) (England)	Krzysztof Jakowczuk; David Jones				not played

==== Semifinals ====
Denmark
3
Gymnastic Centre Kazan, Court 1
17 February 2018 16:00

Germany
1

			1	2	3
1	(Denmark) (Germany)	Anders Antonsen; Marc Zwiebler	21; 13	19; 21	21; 16
2	(Denmark) (Germany)	Mads Conrad-Petersen / Mads Pieler Kolding; Jones Ralfy Jansen / Josche Zurwonne	21; 14	21; 10
3	(Denmark) (Germany)	Emil Holst; Kai Schaefer	18; 21	18; 21
4	(Denmark) (Germany)	Kim Astrup / Mathias Christiansen; Mark Lamsfuß / Marvin Seidel	21; 17	25; 23
5	(Denmark) (Germany)	Jan Ø. Jørgensen; Max Weißkirchen				not played

France
1
Gymnastic Centre Kazan, Court 2
17 February 2018 14:00

England
3

			1	2	3
1	(France) (England)	Brice Leverdez; Rajiv Ouseph	14; 21	21; 17	13; 21
2	(France) (England)	Bastian Kersaudy / Julien Maio; Marcus Ellis / Chris Langridge	9; 21	17; 21
3	(France) (England)	Lucas Corvee; Sam Parsons	21; 15	21; 17
4	(France) (England)	Thom Gicquel / Toma Junior Popov; Peter Briggs / Sean Vendy	16; 21	15; 21
5	(France) (England)	Lucas Claerbout; David Jones				not played

==== Final ====
Denmark
3
Gymnastic Centre Kazan, Court 1
18 February 2018 16:00

England
1

			1	2	3
1	(Denmark) (England)	Anders Antonsen; Rajiv Ouseph	12; 21	21; 15	21; 19
2	(Denmark) (England)	Mads Conrad-Petersen / Mads Pieler Kolding; Marcus Ellis / Chris Langridge	21; 18	21; 13
3	(Denmark) (England)	Emil Holst; Sam Parsons	16; 21	10; 21
4	(Denmark) (England)	Kim Astrup / Mathias Christiansen; Peter Briggs / Sean Vendy	19; 21	29; 27	21; 12
5	(Denmark) (England)	Jan Ø. Jørgensen; David Jones				not played

== Women's team ==
=== Format ===
In each group, teams played each other once. The six group winners and the two best runners-up qualified for the knockout stage.

=== Groups ===
All times are Kazan Standard Time (UTC+03:00).

==== Group 1 ====
Pos	Team	Pld	W	L	MF	MA	MD	GF	GA	GD	PF	PA	PD	Pts	Qualification
1	Denmark	3	3	0	19	1	+18	29	3	+26	659	339	+320	3	Knockout stage
2	Sweden	3	2	1	10	5	+5	21	11	+10	570	451	+119	2	
3	Israel	3	1	2	4	11	−7	8	23	−15	413	610	−197	1	
4	Iceland	3	0	3	2	18	−16	5	26	−21	378	630	−252	0	

Source: TS
- Denmark vs. Sweden

Denmark
4
Gymnastic Centre Kazan, Court 1
13 February 2018 10:00

Sweden
1

			1	2	3
1	(Denmark) (Sweden)	Mia Blichfeldt; Ashwathi Pillai	21; 8	21; 5
2	(Denmark) (Sweden)	Line Kjærsfeldt; Emma Karlsson	21; 17	21; 18
3	(Denmark) (Sweden)	Natalia Koch Rohde; Johanna Magnusson	21; 15	21; 11
4	(Denmark) (Sweden)	Julie Dawall Jakobsen / Kamilla Rytter Juhl; Amanda Högström / Clara Nistad	21; 17	14; 21	16; 21
5	(Denmark) (Sweden)	Maiken Fruergaard / Sara Thygesen; Emma Karlsson / Johanna Magnusson	21; 10	20; 22	21; 6

- Israel vs. Iceland

Israel
3
Gymnastic Centre Kazan, Court 8
13 February 2018 13:30

Iceland
2

			1	2	3
1	(Israel) (Iceland)	Dana Danilenko; Margrét Johannsdottir	18; 21	21; 17	21; 17
2	(Israel) (Iceland)	Yuval Pugach; Sigridur Arnadottir	15; 21	18; 21
3	(Israel) (Iceland)	Margeret Lurie; Arna Karen Johannsdottir	24; 22	21; 18
4	(Israel) (Iceland)	Yana Molodezki / Yuval Pugach; Sigridur Arnadottir / Margrét Johannsdottir	13; 21	7; 21
5	(Israel) (Iceland)	Dana Danilenko / Margeret Lurie; Thorunn Eylands / Arna Karen Johannsdottir	21; 16	21; 16

- Denmark vs. Israel

Denmark
5
Gymnastic Centre Kazan, Court 6
14 February 2018 09:00

Israel
0

			1	2	3
1	(Denmark) (Israel)	Line Kjærsfeldt; Dana Danilenko	21; 12	21; 12
2	(Denmark) (Israel)	Natalia Koch Rohde; Yuval Pugach	21; 6	21; 6
3	(Denmark) (Israel)	Julie Dawall Jakobsen; Yana Molodezki	21; 9	21; 9
4	(Denmark) (Israel)	Mia Blichfeldt / Maiken Fruergaard; Dana Danilenko / Margeret Lurie	21; 12	21; 17
5	(Denmark) (Israel)	Kamilla Rytter Juhl / Sara Thygesen; Yana Molodezki / Yuval Pugach	21; 10	21; 5

- Sweden vs. Iceland

Sweden
5
Gymnastic Centre Kazan, Court 8
14 February 2018 09:00

Iceland
0

			1	2	3
1	(Sweden) (Iceland)	Ashwathi Pillai; Margrét Johannsdottir	21; 19	21; 11
2	(Sweden) (Iceland)	Emma Karlsson; Sigridur Arnadottir	21; 10	21; 8
3	(Sweden) (Iceland)	Johanna Magnusson; Thorunn Eylands	21; 8	21; 4
4	(Sweden) (Iceland)	Amanda Högström / Clara Nistad; Sigridur Arnadottir / Margrét Johannsdottir	21; 8	21; 12
5	(Sweden) (Iceland)	Emma Karlsson / Johanna Magnusson; Thorunn Eylands / Arna Karen Johannsdottir	21; 8	21; 9

- Denmark vs. Iceland

Denmark
5
Gymnastic Centre Kazan, Court 3
14 February 2018 19:00

Iceland
0

			1	2	3
1	(Denmark) (Iceland)	Mia Blichfeldt; Margrét Johannsdottir	21; 9	21; 13
2	(Denmark) (Iceland)	Line Kjærsfeldt; Arna Karen Johannsdottir	21; 6	21; 9
3	(Denmark) (Iceland)	Julie Dawall Jakobsen; Thorunn Eylands	21; 1	21; 2
4	(Denmark) (Iceland)	Kamilla Rytter Juhl / Maiken Fruergaard; Sigridur Arnadottir / Margrét Johannsdottir	21; 9	21; 9
5	(Denmark) (Iceland)	Natalia Koch Rohde / Sara Thygesen; Thorunn Eylands / Arna Karen Johannsdottir	21; 7	21; 5

- Sweden vs. Israel

Sweden
4
Gymnastic Centre Kazan, Court 4
14 February 2018 19:00

Israel
1

			1	2	3
1	(Sweden) (Israel)	Ashwathi Pillai; Dana Danilenko	12; 21	9; 21
2	(Sweden) (Israel)	Emma Karlsson; Yuval Pugach	21; 10	21; 13
3	(Sweden) (Israel)	Johanna Magnusson; Margeret Lurie	21; 10	21; 14
4	(Sweden) (Israel)	Amanda Högström / Clara Nistad; Yana Molodezki / Yuval Pugach	21; 6	21; 6
5	(Sweden) (Israel)	Emma Karlsson / Johanna Magnusson; Dana Danilenko / Margeret Lurie	21; 7	21; 7

==== Group 2 ====
Pos	Team	Pld	W	L	MF	MA	MD	GF	GA	GD	PF	PA	PD	Pts	Qualification
1	Spain	3	3	0	11	4	+7	24	9	+15	658	486	+172	3	Knockout stage
2	Hungary	3	2	1	11	4	+7	23	13	+10	689	603	+86	2	
3	Slovakia	3	1	2	6	9	−3	15	19	−4	605	639	−34	1	
4	Portugal	3	0	3	2	13	−11	7	28	−21	489	713	−224	0	

Source: TS
- Spain vs. Hungary

Spain
3
Gymnastic Centre Kazan, Court 3
13 February 2018 10:00

Hungary
2

			1	2	3
1	(Spain) (Hungary)	Carolina Marín; Agnes Korosi	21; 7	21; 6
2	(Spain) (Hungary)	Beatriz Corrales; Daniella Gonda	21; 16	21; 16
3	(Spain) (Hungary)	Sara Peñalver Pereira; Vivien Sandorhazi	23; 21	18; 21	21; 16
4	(Spain) (Hungary)	Elena Fernández / Lorena Usle; Nikoletta Bukoviczki / Daniella Gonda	26; 24	13; 21	18; 21
5	(Spain) (Hungary)	Beatriz Corrales / Sara Peñalver Pereira; Reka Madarasz / Vivien Sandorhazi	21; 12	16; 21	19; 21

- Portugal vs. Slovakia

Portugal
2
Gymnastic Centre Kazan, Court 4
13 February 2018 10:00

Slovakia
3

			1	2	3
1	(Portugal) (Slovakia)	Sonia Goncalves; Martina Repiska	15; 21	15; 21
2	(Portugal) (Slovakia)	Adriana F. Goncalves; Lucia Grencikova	14; 21	21; 17	17; 21
3	(Portugal) (Slovakia)	Mariana Chang; Katarina Vargova	10; 21	8; 21
4	(Portugal) (Slovakia)	Adriana F. Goncalves / Sonia Goncalves; Alzbeta Perunska / Martina Repiska	29; 30	21; 19	21; 13
5	(Portugal) (Slovakia)	Mariana Chang / Ana Reis; Mia Tarcalova / Katarina Vargova	13; 21	21; 14	22; 20

- Spain vs. Portugal

Spain
5
Gymnastic Centre Kazan, Court 3
14 February 2018 09:00

Portugal
0

			1	2	3
1	(Spain) (Portugal)	Carolina Marín; Sonia Goncalves	21; 4	21; 9
2	(Spain) (Portugal)	Beatriz Corrales; Adriana F. Goncalves	21; 9	21; 12
3	(Spain) (Portugal)	Sara Peñalver Pereira; Catarina Cristina	21; 11	21; 14
4	(Spain) (Portugal)	Elena Fernández / Lorena Usle; Adriana F. Goncalves / Sonia Goncalves	21; 17	21; 13
5	(Spain) (Portugal)	Beatriz Corrales / Sara Peñalver Pereira; Mariana Chang / Ana Reis	21; 9	21; 10

- Hungary vs. Slovakia

Hungary
4
Gymnastic Centre Kazan, Court 9
14 February 2018 09:00

Slovakia
1

			1	2	3
1	(Hungary) (Slovakia)	Agnes Korosi; Martina Repiska	14; 21	14; 21
2	(Hungary) (Slovakia)	Daniella Gonda; Lucia Grencikova	21; 10	21; 15
3	(Hungary) (Slovakia)	Vivien Sandorhazi; Katarina Vargova	21; 11	21; 16
4	(Hungary) (Slovakia)	Nikoletta Bukoviczki / Daniella Gonda; Alzbeta Perunska / Martina Repiska	21; 17	23; 25	21; 16
5	(Hungary) (Slovakia)	Reka Madarasz / Vivien Sandorhazi; Mia Tarcalova / Katarina Vargova	25; 23	21; 15

- Spain vs. Slovakia

Spain
3
Gymnastic Centre Kazan, Court 6
15 February 2018 14:00

Slovakia
2

			1	2	3
1	(Spain) (Slovakia)	Carolina Marín; Martina Repiska	21; 19	21; 7
2	(Spain) (Slovakia)	Beatriz Corrales; Alzbeta Perunska	21; 10	21; 11
3	(Spain) (Slovakia)	Sara Peñalver Pereira; Katarina Vargova	21; 8	21; 15
4	(Spain) (Slovakia)	Elena Fernández / Lorena Usle; Alzbeta Perunska / Martina Repiska	12; 21	20; 22
5	(Spain) (Slovakia)	Beatriz Corrales / Sara Peñalver Pereira; Mia Tarcalova / Katarina Vargova	18; 21	13; 21

- Hungary vs. Portugal

Hungary
5
Gymnastic Centre Kazan, Court 8
15 February 2018 14:00

Portugal
0

			1	2	3
1	(Hungary) (Portugal)	Agnes Korosi; Sonia Goncalves	21; 13	21; 16
2	(Hungary) (Portugal)	Reka Madarasz; Adriana F. Goncalves	21; 5	21; 8
3	(Hungary) (Portugal)	Vivien Sandorhazi; Mariana Chang	21; 6	21; 7
4	(Hungary) (Portugal)	Nikoletta Bukoviczki / Daniella Gonda; Adriana F. Goncalves / Sonia Goncalves	21; 18	16; 21	21; 9
5	(Hungary) (Portugal)	Reka Madarasz / Vivien Sandorhazi; Mariana Chang / Ana Reis	16; 21	21; 10	22; 20

==== Group 3 ====
Pos	Team	Pld	W	L	MF	MA	MD	GF	GA	GD	PF	PA	PD	Pts	Qualification
1	Germany	3	3	0	15	0	+15	30	4	+26	702	479	+223	3	Knockout stage
2	Ukraine	3	2	1	10	5	+5	24	12	+12	698	561	+137	2	
3	Ireland	3	1	2	5	10	−5	12	20	−8	516	582	−66	1	
4	Lithuania	3	0	3	0	15	−15	0	30	−30	336	630	−294	0	

Source: TS
- Ukraine vs. Ireland

Ukraine
5
Gymnastic Centre Kazan, Court 7
13 February 2018 10:00

Ireland
0

			1	2	3
1	(Ukraine) (Republic of Ireland)	Maria Ulitina; Rachael Darragh	18; 21	21; 9	21; 10
2	(Ukraine) (Republic of Ireland)	Natalya Voytsekh; Chloe Magee	21; 15	21; 16
3	(Ukraine) (Republic of Ireland)	Maryna Ilyinskaya; Kate Frost	21; 15	21; 11
4	(Ukraine) (Republic of Ireland)	Maryna Ilyinskaya / Yelyzaveta Zharka; Rachael Darragh / Chloe Magee	21; 13	21; 19
5	(Ukraine) (Republic of Ireland)	Yuliya Kazarinova / Elena Prus; Kate Frost / Moya Ryan	21; 13	19; 21	21; 8

- Germany vs. Lithuania

Germany
5
Gymnastic Centre Kazan, Court 6
13 February 2018 13:30

Lithuania
0

			1	2	3
1	(Germany) (Lithuania)	Fabienne Deprez; Gerda Voitechovskaja	21; 14	21; 10
2	(Germany) (Lithuania)	Luise Heim; Vytaute Fomkinaite	21; 9	21; 14
3	(Germany) (Lithuania)	Yvonne Li; Rebeka Alekseviciute	21; 13	21; 11
4	(Germany) (Lithuania)	Isabel Herttrich / Carla Nelte; Vytaute Fomkinaite / Gerda Voitechovskaja	21; 8	21; 12
5	(Germany) (Lithuania)	Linda Efler / Olga Konon; Rebeka Alekseviciute / Gabija Mockute	21; 6	21; 6

- Germany vs. Ukraine

Germany
5
Gymnastic Centre Kazan, Court 1
14 February 2018 09:00

Ukraine
0

			1	2	3
1	(Germany) (Ukraine)	Fabienne Deprez; Maria Ulitina	18; 21	21; 14	21; 18
2	(Germany) (Ukraine)	Luise Heim; Natalya Voytsekh	24; 22	20; 22	21; 15
3	(Germany) (Ukraine)	Yvonne Li; Maryna Ilyinskaya	22; 20	21; 17
4	(Germany) (Ukraine)	Johanna Goliszewski / Lara Kaepplein; Yuliya Kazarinova / Elena Prus	12; 21	21; 14	21; 10
5	(Germany) (Ukraine)	Isabel Herttrich / Carla Nelte; Maryna Ilyinskaya / Yelyzaveta Zharka	17; 21	21; 14	21; 12

- Lithuania vs. Ireland

Lithuania
0
Gymnastic Centre Kazan, Court 4
14 February 2018 09:00

Ireland
5

			1	2	3
1	(Lithuania) (Republic of Ireland)	Gerda Voitechovskaja; Rachael Darragh	17; 21	14; 21
2	(Lithuania) (Republic of Ireland)	Vytaute Fomkinaite; Chloe Magee	15; 21	6; 21
3	(Lithuania) (Republic of Ireland)	Rebeka Alekseviciute; Kate Frost	11; 21	14; 21
4	(Lithuania) (Republic of Ireland)	Vytaute Fomkinaite / Gerda Voitechovskaja; Rachael Darragh / Chloe Magee	18; 21	12; 21
5	(Lithuania) (Republic of Ireland)	Rebeka Alekseviciute / Gabija Mockute; Kate Frost / Moya Ryan	7; 21	10; 21

- Germany vs. Ireland

Germany
5
Gymnastic Centre Kazan, Court 9
14 February 2018 19:00

Ireland
0

			1	2	3
1	(Germany) (Republic of Ireland)	Fabienne Deprez; Rachael Darragh	22; 20	21; 14
2	(Germany) (Republic of Ireland)	Luise Heim; Moya Ryan	21; 3	21; 11
3	(Germany) (Republic of Ireland)	Yvonne Li; Kate Frost	21; 17	21; 10
4	(Germany) (Republic of Ireland)	Isabel Herttrich / Carla Nelte; Rachael Darragh / Chloe Magee	21; 19	21; 17
5	(Germany) (Republic of Ireland)	Linda Efler / Olga Konon; Kate Frost / Moya Ryan	21; 9	21; 15

- Lithuania vs. Ukraine

Lithuania
0
Gymnastic Centre Kazan, Court 8
14 February 2018 19:00

Ukraine
5

			1	2	3
1	(Lithuania) (Ukraine)	Gerda Voitechovskaja; Maria Ulitina	16; 21	10; 21
2	(Lithuania) (Ukraine)	Vytaute Fomkinaite; Natalya Voytsekh	6; 21	19; 21
3	(Lithuania) (Ukraine)	Rebeka Alekseviciute; Anastasiya Prozorova	12; 21	10; 21
4	(Lithuania) (Ukraine)	Vytaute Fomkinaite / Gerda Voitechovskaja; Maryna Ilyinskaya / Yelyzaveta Zharka	9; 21	16; 21
5	(Lithuania) (Ukraine)	Rebeka Alekseviciute / Gabija Mockute; Yuliya Kazarinova / Elena Prus	6; 21	5; 21

==== Group 4 ====
Pos	Team	Pld	W	L	MF	MA	MD	GF	GA	GD	PF	PA	PD	Pts	Qualification
1	Russia	3	3	0	13	2	+11	27	7	+20	678	519	+159	3	Knockout stage
2	Turkey	3	2	1	11	4	+7	25	9	+16	667	493	+174	2	Knockout stage
3	Estonia	3	1	2	6	9	−3	13	21	−8	562	604	−42	1	
4	Latvia	3	0	3	0	15	−15	2	30	−28	371	662	−291	0	

Source: TS
- Russia vs. Turkey

Russia
3
Gymnastic Centre Kazan, Court
13 February 2018 18:00

Turkey
2

			1	2	3
1	(Russia) (Turkey)	Evgeniya Kosetskaya; Neslihan Yiğit	21; 17	21; 12
2	(Russia) (Turkey)	Natalia Perminova; Aliye Demirbağ	21; 15	18; 21	14; 21
3	(Russia) (Turkey)	Elena Komendrovskaja; Özge Bayrak	12; 21	18; 21
4	(Russia) (Turkey)	Anastasia Chervyakova / Olga Morozova; Bengisu Erçetin / Nazlıcan İnci	22; 20	16; 21	21; 16
5	(Russia) (Turkey)	Ekaterina Bolotova / Alina Davletova; Özge Bayrak / Neslihan Yiğit	21; 12	18; 21	21; 12

- Estonia vs. Latvia

Estonia
5
Gymnastic Centre Kazan, Court 8
13 February 2018 18:00

Latvia
0

			1	2	3
1	(Estonia) (Latvia)	Kristin Kuuba; Ieva Pope	21; 10	21; 5
2	(Estonia) (Latvia)	Getter Saar; Monika Radovska	21; 17	21; 10
3	(Estonia) (Latvia)	Kati-Kreet Marran; Jekaterina Romanova	21; 12	10; 21	21; 5
4	(Estonia) (Latvia)	Kristin Kuuba / Helina Rüütel; Ieva Pope / Monika Radovska	21; 7	21; 12
5	(Estonia) (Latvia)	Kati-Kreet Marran / Hannaliina Piho; Liana Lencevica / Jekaterina Romanova	21; 11	19; 21	24; 22

- Turkey vs. Latvia

Turkey
5
Gymnastic Centre Kazan, Court 4
14 February 2018 12:00

Latvia
0

			1	2	3
1	(Turkey) (Latvia)	Neslihan Yiğit; Monika Radovska	21; 5	21; 9
2	(Turkey) (Latvia)	Aliye Demirbağ; Jekaterina Romanova	21; 12	21; 4
3	(Turkey) (Latvia)	Özge Bayrak; Liana Lencevica	21; 9	21; 5
4	(Turkey) (Latvia)	Bengisu Erçetin / Nazlıcan İnci; Ieva Pope / Monika Radovska	21; 6	21; 18
5	(Turkey) (Latvia)	Özge Bayrak / Neslihan Yiğit; Liana Lencevica / Jekaterina Romanova	21; 9	21; 14

- Russia vs. Estonia

Russia
5
Gymnastic Centre Kazan, Court 3
14 February 2018 16:00

Estonia
0

			1	2	3
1	(Russia) (Estonia)	Evgeniya Kosetskaya; Kristin Kuuba	21; 18	21; 12
2	(Russia) (Estonia)	Anastasiia Pustinskaia; Getter Saar	21; 17	12; 21	21; 19
3	(Russia) (Estonia)	Elena Komendrovskaja; Kati-Kreet Marran	21; 7	21; 14
4	(Russia) (Estonia)	Anastasia Chervyakova / Olga Morozova; Kristin Kuuba / Helina Rüütel	21; 15	23; 21
5	(Russia) (Estonia)	Ekaterina Bolotova / Alina Davletova; Kati-Kreet Marran / Getter Saar	21; 4	21; 14

- Russia vs. Latvia

Russia
5
Gymnastic Centre Kazan, Court 3
15 February 2018 14:00

Latvia
0

			1	2	3
1	(Russia) (Latvia)	Natalia Perminova; Ieva Pope	21; 15	21; 11
2	(Russia) (Latvia)	Ksenia Evgenova; Monika Radovska	21; 17	21; 16
3	(Russia) (Latvia)	Elena Komendrovskaja; Jekaterina Romanova	21; 8	21; 17
4	(Russia) (Latvia)	Anastasia Chervyakova / Olga Morozova; Ieva Pope / Monika Radovska	21; 12	21; 13
5	(Russia) (Latvia)	Alina Davletova / Nina Vislova; Liana Lencevica / Jekaterina Romanova	21; 5	21; 13

- Turkey vs. Estonia

Turkey
4
Gymnastic Centre Kazan, Court 2
15 February 2018 14:00

Estonia
1

			1	2	3
1	(Turkey) (Estonia)	Neslihan Yiğit; Kristin Kuuba	19; 21	21; 18	19; 21
2	(Turkey) (Estonia)	Aliye Demirbağ; Getter Saar	21; 9	21; 12
3	(Turkey) (Estonia)	Özge Bayrak; Kati-Kreet Marran	21; 8	21; 13
4	(Turkey) (Estonia)	Bengisu Erçetin / Nazlıcan İnci; Kristin Kuuba / Helina Rüütel	21; 16	21; 14
5	(Turkey) (Estonia)	Özge Bayrak / Neslihan Yiğit; Kati-Kreet Marran / Hannaliina Piho	21; 13	21; 13

==== Group 5 ====
Pos	Team	Pld	W	L	MF	MA	MD	GF	GA	GD	PF	PA	PD	Pts	Qualification
1	Bulgaria	3	3	0	13	2	+11	27	4	+23	645	359	+286	3	Knockout stage
2	France	3	2	1	12	3	+9	24	7	+17	602	412	+190	2	Knockout stage
3	Belarus	3	1	2	5	10	−5	10	20	−10	413	535	−122	1	
4	Greenland	3	0	3	0	15	−15	0	30	−30	276	630	−354	0	

Source: TS
- Greenland vs. Belarus

Greenland
0
Gymnastic Centre Kazan, Court 7
13 February 2018 13:30

Belarus
5

			1	2	3
1	(Greenland) (Belarus)	Sara Lindskov Jacobsen; Alesia Zaitsava	13; 21	10; 21
2	(Greenland) (Belarus)	Celia Villebro Rasmussen; Anastasiya Cherniavskaya	11; 21	11; 21
3	(Greenland) (Belarus)	Nina Høegh; Maryana Viarbitskaya	7; 21	7; 21
4	(Greenland) (Belarus)	Sara Lindskov Jacobsen / Celia Villebro Rasmussen; Anastasiya Cherniavskaya / Alesia Zaitsava	12; 21	17; 21
5	(Greenland) (Belarus)	Milka Brønlund / Nina Høegh; Julia Bitsoukova / Maryana Viarbitskaya	12; 21	15; 21

- Bulgaria vs. France

Bulgaria
3
Gymnastic Centre Kazan, Court 2
13 February 2018 18:00

France
2

			1	2	3
1	(Bulgaria) (France)	Linda Zechiri; Yaëlle Hoyaux	21; 12	23; 21
2	(Bulgaria) (France)	Mariya Mitsova; Marie Batomene	20; 22	21; 18	19; 21
3	(Bulgaria) (France)	Stefani Stoeva; Léonice Huet	21; 16	21; 9
4	(Bulgaria) (France)	Mariya Mitsova / Dimitria Popstoikova; Delphine Delrue / Léa Palermo	19; 21	18; 21
5	(Bulgaria) (France)	Gabriela Stoeva / Stefani Stoeva; Émilie Lefel / Anne Tran	21; 8	21; 13

- Bulgaria vs. Greenland

Bulgaria
5
Gymnastic Centre Kazan, Court 7
14 February 2018 12:00

Greenland
0

			1	2	3
1	(Bulgaria) (Greenland)	Linda Zechiri; Sara Lindskov Jacobsen	21; 12	21; 5
2	(Bulgaria) (Greenland)	Mariya Mitsova; Celia Villebro Rasmussen	21; 10	21; 10
3	(Bulgaria) (Greenland)	Maria Delcheva; Nina Høegh	21; 7	21; 8
4	(Bulgaria) (Greenland)	Gabriela Stoeva / Stefani Stoeva; Sara Lindskov Jacobsen / Celia Villebro Rasmussen	21; 5	21; 4
5	(Bulgaria) (Greenland)	Mariya Mitsova / Dimitria Popstoikova; Milka Brønlund / Nina Høegh	21; 7	21; 2

- France vs. Belarus

France
5
Gymnastic Centre Kazan, Court 1
14 February 2018 12:00

Belarus
0

			1	2	3
1	(France) (Belarus)	Yaëlle Hoyaux; Alesia Zaitsava	21; 9	21; 7
2	(France) (Belarus)	Marie Batomene; Anastasiya Cherniavskaya	21; 12	21; 9
3	(France) (Belarus)	Katia Normand; Julia Bitsoukova	21; 13	21; 17
4	(France) (Belarus)	Delphine Delrue / Léa Palermo; Anastasiya Cherniavskaya / Alesia Zaitsava	21; 5	21; 14
5	(France) (Belarus)	Audrey Fontaine / Anne Tran; Julia Bitsoukova / Maryana Viarbitskaya	21; 5	21; 5

- Bulgaria vs. Belarus

Bulgaria
5
Gymnastic Centre Kazan, Court 9
15 February 2018 14:00

Belarus
0

			1	2	3
1	(Bulgaria) (Belarus)	Linda Zechiri; Anastasiya Cherniavskaya	21; 16	21; 14
2	(Bulgaria) (Belarus)	Mariya Mitsova; Julia Bitsoukova	21; 8	21; 11
3	(Bulgaria) (Belarus)	Maria Delcheva; Maryana Viarbitskaya	21; 17	21; 9
4	(Bulgaria) (Belarus)	Gabriela Stoeva / Stefani Stoeva; Anastasiya Cherniavskaya / Alesia Zaitsava	21; 8	21; 7
5	(Bulgaria) (Belarus)	Mariya Mitsova / Dimitria Popstoikova; Julia Bitsoukova / Maryana Viarbitskaya	21; 8	21; 7

- France vs. Greenland

France
5
Gymnastic Centre Kazan, Court 5
15 February 2018 14:00

Greenland
0

			1	2	3
1	(France) (Greenland)	Yaëlle Hoyaux; Sara Lindskov Jacobsen	21; 10	21; 9
2	(France) (Greenland)	Katia Normand; Milka Brønlund	21; 5	21; 5
3	(France) (Greenland)	Léonice Huet; Celia Villebro Rasmussen	21; 16	21; 10
4	(France) (Greenland)	Delphine Delrue / Léa Palermo; Milka Brønlund / Nina Høegh	21; 6	21; 8
5	(France) (Greenland)	Émilie Lefel / Anne Tran; Sara Lindskov Jacobsen / Celia Villebro Rasmussen	21; 10	21; 12

==== Group 6 ====
Pos	Team	Pld	W	L	MF	MA	MD	GF	GA	GD	PF	PA	PD	Pts	Qualification
1	England	3	3	0	14	1	+13	29	2	+27	649	462	+187	3	Knockout stage
2	Poland	3	2	1	7	8	−1	15	18	−3	598	623	−25	2	
3	Czech Republic	3	1	2	7	8	−1	16	20	−4	657	649	+8	1	
4	Norway	3	0	3	2	13	−11	7	27	−20	520	690	−170	0	

Source: TS
- England vs. Norway

England
5
Gymnastic Centre Kazan, Court 9
13 February 2018 10:00

Norway
0

			1	2	3
1	(England) (Norway)	Chloe Birch; Elisa Wiborg	21; 10	21; 11
2	(England) (Norway)	Lauren Smith / Sarah Walker; Solvår Flåten Jørgensen / Natalie Syvertsen	21; 14	21; 7
3	(England) (Norway)	Grace King; Emilie Hamang	21; 17	21; 12
4	(England) (Norway)	Chloe Birch / Jessica Pugh; Emilie Hamang / Anne Klyve	21; 4	21; 14
5	(England) (Norway)	Abigail Holden; Vera Ellingsen	21; 16	21; 18

- Czech Republic vs. Poland

Czech Republic
2
Gymnastic Centre Kazan, Court 2
13 February 2018 10:00

Poland
3

			1	2	3
1	(Czech Republic) (Poland)	Katerina Tomalova; Wiktoria Dabczynska	22; 24	18; 21
2	(Czech Republic) (Poland)	Zuzana Pavelkova; Oliwia Socha	21; 11	21; 8
3	(Czech Republic) (Poland)	Tereza Švábíková; Karolina Wladzinska	18; 21	21; 17	21; 15
4	(Czech Republic) (Poland)	Alzbeta Basova / Michaela Fuchsova; Magdalena Swierczynska / Aneta Wojtkowska	22; 20	14; 21	15; 21
5	(Czech Republic) (Poland)	Sabina Milova / Tereza Švábíková; Wiktoria Dabczynska / Aleksandra Goszczynska	7; 21	18; 21

- England vs. Czech Republic

England
4
Gymnastic Centre Kazan, Court 6
14 February 2018 19:00

Czech Republic
1

			1	2	3
1	(England) (Czech Republic)	Chloe Birch; Zuzana Pavelkova	21; 15	21; 19
2	(England) (Czech Republic)	Abigail Holden; Tereza Švábíková	22; 20	21; 16
3	(England) (Czech Republic)	Freya Redfearn; Sabina Milova	21; 18	16; 21	20; 22
4	(England) (Czech Republic)	Jenny Moore / Lauren Smith; Alzbeta Basova / Michaela Fuchsova	21; 10	21; 7
5	(England) (Czech Republic)	Chloe Birch / Jessica Pugh; Sabina Milova / Katerina Tomalova	21; 15	21; 14

- Norway vs. Poland

Norway
1
Gymnastic Centre Kazan, Court 5
14 February 2018 19:00

Poland
4

			1	2	3
1	(Norway) (Poland)	Elisa Wiborg; Wiktoria Dabczynska	14; 21	13; 21
2	(Norway) (Poland)	Emilie Hamang; Oliwia Socha	21; 17	21; 10
3	(Norway) (Poland)	Solvår Flåten Jørgensen / Natalie Syvertsen; Wiktoria Dabczynska / Aleksandra Goszczynska	18; 21	14; 21
4	(Norway) (Poland)	Vera Ellingsen; Karolina Wladzinska	15; 21	25; 23	18; 21
5	(Norway) (Poland)	Emilie Hamang / Anne Klyve; Magdalena Swierczynska / Aneta Wojtkowska	14; 21	19; 21

- England vs. Poland

England
5
Gymnastic Centre Kazan, Court 1
15 February 2018 14:00

Poland
0

			1	2	3
1	(England) (Poland)	Chloe Birch; Wiktoria Dabczynska	21; 12	21; 12
2	(England) (Poland)	Jenny Moore / Jessica Pugh; Magdalena Swierczynska / Aneta Wojtkowska	21; 16	21; 17
3	(England) (Poland)	Abigail Holden; Oliwia Socha	21; 16	21; 16
4	(England) (Poland)	Lauren Smith / Sarah Walker; Wiktoria Dabczynska / Aleksandra Goszczynska	21; 16	21; 16
5	(England) (Poland)	Freya Redfearn; Karolina Wladzinska	24; 22	21; 16

- Norway vs. Czech Republic

Norway
1
Gymnastic Centre Kazan, Court 4
15 February 2018 14:00

Czech Republic
4

			1	2	3
1	(Norway) (Czech Republic)	Elisa Wiborg; Zuzana Pavelkova	10; 21	21; 19	21; 19
2	(Norway) (Czech Republic)	Emilie Hamang; Tereza Švábíková	17; 21	14; 21
3	(Norway) (Czech Republic)	Anne Klyve / Elisa Wiborg; Alzbeta Basova / Michaela Fuchsova	11; 21	21; 18	13; 21
4	(Norway) (Czech Republic)	Vera Ellingsen; Sabina Milova	18; 21	12; 21
5	(Norway) (Czech Republic)	Solvår Flåten Jørgensen / Natalie Syvertsen; Tereza Švábíková / Katerina Tomalova	21; 17	9; 21	14; 21

=== Ranking of second-placed teams ===
Pos	Grp	Team	Pld	W	L	MF	MA	MD	GF	GA	GD	PF	PA	PD	Pts	Qualification
1	5	France	3	2	1	12	3	+9	24	7	+17	602	412	+190	2	Knockout stage
2	4	Turkey	3	2	1	11	4	+7	25	9	+16	667	493	+174	2	Knockout stage
3	2	Hungary	3	2	1	11	4	+7	23	13	+10	689	603	+86	2	
4	3	Ukraine	3	2	1	10	5	+5	24	12	+12	698	561	+137	2	
5	1	Sweden	3	2	1	10	5	+5	21	11	+10	570	451	+119	2	
6	6	Poland	3	2	1	7	8	−1	15	18	−3	598	623	−25	2	

=== Knockout stage ===
Quarter-finals
16 February 2018
Denmark	3
England	0
16 February 2018
Russia	3
Bulgaria	1
16 February 2018
France	0
Germany	3
16 February 2018
Turkey	2
Spain	3

Semi-finals
17 February 2018
Denmark	3
Russia	1
17 February 2018
Germany	3
Spain	2

Final
18 February 2018
Denmark	3
Germany	1

==== Quarterfinals ====
Denmark
3
Gymnastic Centre Kazan, Court 1
16 February 2018 10:00

England
0

			1	2	3
1	(Denmark) (England)	Mia Blichfeldt; Chloe Birch	18; 21	21; 19	21; 17
2	(Denmark) (England)	Kamilla Rytter Juhl / Christinna Pedersen; Jessica Pugh / Sarah Walker	21; 13	21; 13
3	(Denmark) (England)	Line Kjaersfeldt; Grace King	5; 2			retired
4	(Denmark) (England)	Maiken Fruergaard / Sara Thygesen; Jenny Moore / Lauren Smith				not played
5	(Denmark) (England)	Natalia Koch Rohde; Abigail Holden				not played

Russia
3
Gymnastic Centre Kazan, Court 1
16 February 2018 12:00

Bulgaria
1

			1	2	3
1	(Russia) (Bulgaria)	Evgeniya Kosetskaya; Linda Zetchiri	16; 21	21; 13	21; 15
2	(Russia) (Bulgaria)	Natalia Perminova; Mariya Mitsova	21; 18	7; 21	21; 18
3	(Russia) (Bulgaria)	Anastasia Chervyakova / Olga Morozova; Gabriela Stoeva / Stefani Stoeva	9; 21	21; 19	9; 21
4	(Russia) (Bulgaria)	Anastasiia Pustinskaia; Maria Delcheva	21; 9	21; 14
5	(Russia) (Bulgaria)	Ekaterina Bolotova / Alina Davletova; Mariya Mitsova / Dimitria Popstoikova				not played

France
0
Gymnastic Centre Kazan, Court 2
16 February 2018 11:00

Germany
3

			1	2	3
1	(France) (Germany)	Yaëlle Hoyaux; Fabienne Deprez	21; 11	21; 23	13; 21
2	(France) (Germany)	Emilie Lefel / Anne Tran; Isabel Herttrich / Carla Nelte	12; 21	21; 19	16; 21
3	(France) (Germany)	Marie Batomene; Luise Heim	11; 21	9; 21
4	(France) (Germany)	Delphine Delrue / Lea Palermo; Johanna Goliszewski / Lara Kaepplein				not played
5	(France) (Germany)	Léonice Huet; Yvonne Li				not played

Turkey
2
Gymnastic Centre Kazan, Court 3
16 February 2018 13:30

Spain
3

			1	2	3
1	(Turkey) (Spain)	Neslihan Yigit; Carolina Marín	3; 21	11; 21
2	(Turkey) (Spain)	Aliye Demirbag; Beatriz Corrales	21; 7	15; 21	15; 21
3	(Turkey) (Spain)	Ozge Bayrak; Sara Peñalver Pereira	21; 13	21; 10
4	(Turkey) (Spain)	Bengisu Ercetin / Nazlican Inci; Elena Fernández / Lorena Usle	20; 22	21; 16	21; 11
5	(Turkey) (Spain)	Ozge Bayrak / Neslihan Yigit; Beatriz Corrales / Carolina Marín	22; 24	15; 21

==== Semifinals ====
Denmark
3
Gymnastic Centre Kazan, Court 1
17 February 2018 12:00

Russia
1

			1	2	3
1	(Denmark) (Russia)	Mia Blichfeldt; Evgeniya Kosetskaya	20; 22	21; 15	9; 21
2	(Denmark) (Russia)	Kamilla Rytter Juhl / Christinna Pedersen; Anastasia Chervyakova / Olga Morozova	21; 12	21; 19
3	(Denmark) (Russia)	Line Kjaersfeldt; Natalia Perminova	21; 14	22; 20
4	(Denmark) (Russia)	Maiken Fruergaard / Sara Thygesen; Ekaterina Bolotova / Alina Davletova	21; 17	21; 10
5	(Denmark) (Russia)	Natalia Koch Rohde; Anastasiia Pustinskaia				not played

Germany
3
Gymnastic Centre Kazan, Court 3
17 February 2018 14:00

Spain
2

			1	2	3
1	(Germany) (Spain)	Fabienne Deprez; Carolina Marín	14; 21	6; 21
2	(Germany) (Spain)	Luise Heim; Beatriz Corrales	18; 21	12; 21
3	(Germany) (Spain)	Isabel Herttrich / Lara Kaepplein; Elena Fernández / Lorena Usle	21; 12	21; 7
4	(Germany) (Spain)	Yvonne Li; Sara Peñalver Pereira	21; 16	21; 13
5	(Germany) (Spain)	Johanna Goliszewski / Carla Nelte; Beatriz Corrales / Carolina Marín	21; 13	21; 9

==== Final ====
Denmark
3
Gymnastic Centre Kazan, Court 1
18 February 2018 12:00

Germany
1

			1	2	3
1	(Denmark) (Germany)	Mia Blichfeldt; Fabienne Deprez	15; 21	15; 21
2	(Denmark) (Germany)	Kamilla Rytter Juhl / Christinna Pedersen; Isabel Herttrich / Olga Konon	21; 15	21; 11
3	(Denmark) (Germany)	Line Kjaersfeldt; Luise Heim	16; 21	21; 8	21; 13
4	(Denmark) (Germany)	Maiken Fruergaard / Sara Thygesen; Johanna Goliszewski / Carla Nelte	21; 19	21; 14
5	(Denmark) (Germany)	Natalia Koch Rohde; Yvonne Li				not played
