= Lars Schänzler =

German badminton player (born 1995)

Personal information
- Born: 24 August 1995 (age 30)

Sport
- Country: Germany
- Sport: Badminton
- Handedness: Right

Men's singles
- Highest ranking: 117 (20 September 2018)
- Current ranking: 176 (30 April 2019)
- BWF profile
Medal record
Men's badminton
Representing Germany
European Mixed Team Championships
Silver medal – second place	2019 Copenhagen	Mixed team
Bronze medal – third place	2017 Lubin	Mixed team
European Men's Team Championships
Bronze medal – third place	2018 Kazan	Men's team
Bronze medal – third place	2016 Kazan	Men's team
Bronze medal – third place	2014 Basel	Men's team
European Junior Championships
Bronze medal – third place	2013 Ankara	Mixed team

Lars Schänzler (born 24 August 1995) is a badminton player from Germany.

== Career ==
Schänzler started playing badminton aged eight. In 2013, he became the boys' singles runner-up at the U-19 German Championships. At the same year, he competed at the European Junior Championships reaching the quarter finals. Together with the national team, he won the bronze medals at the 2014, 2016, 2018 European Men's Team Championships and at the 2017 European Mixed Team Championships.

== Achievements ==
=== BWF International Challenge/Series ===
Men's singles

Year	Tournament	Opponent	Score	Result
2019	Hellas International	(Bulgaria) Dimitar Yanakiev	14–21, 21–17, 21–19	(gold) Winner
2018	Irish Open	(France) Léo Rossi	17–21, 9–21	(silver) Runner-up
2017	Italian International	(Spain) Pablo Abian	21–18, 16–21, 14–21	(silver) Runner-up

BWF International Challenge tournament
BWF International Series tournament
BWF Future Series tournament
