= Badminton at the 2022 Mediterranean Games =

Badminton competition

- Venue: Multipurpose Omnisports Hall
- Location: Oued Tlélat, Oran Province
- Dates: 26–30 June
- Competitors: 50 from 13 nations

The Badminton event at the 2022 Mediterranean Games was held in Oued Tlélat, Oran Province, Algeria, from 26 to 30 June 2022.

== Medal summary ==
=== Medalists ===
Event	Gold	Silver	Bronze
Men's singles	Pablo Abián; Spain	Luís Enrique Peñalver; Spain	Emre Lale; Turkey Andraž Krapež; Slovenia
Men's doubles	Algeria; Koceila Mammeri; Youcef Sabri Medel	Spain; Pablo Abián; Luís Enrique Peñalver	Croatia; Luka Ban; Filip Špoljarec Italy; Fabio Caponio; Giovanni Toti
Women's singles	Neslihan Yiğit; Turkey	Beatriz Corrales; Spain	Özge Bayrak; Turkey Doha Hany; Egypt
Women's doubles	Turkey; Bengisu Erçetin; Nazlıcan İnci	Italy; Katharina Fink; Yasmine Hamza	Cyprus; Eleni Christodoulou; Eva Kattirtzi Serbia; Sara Lončar; Marija Sudimac

== Medal table ==
* Host nation (Algeria)

Rank	Nation	Gold	Silver	Bronze	Total
1	Turkey	2	0	2	4
2	Spain	1	3	0	4
3	Algeria*	1	0	0	1
4	Italy	0	1	1	2
5	Croatia	0	0	1	1
5	Cyprus	0	0	1	1
5	Egypt	0	0	1	1
5	Serbia	0	0	1	1
5	Slovenia	0	0	1	1
Totals (9 entries)		4	4	8	16
