= Matteo Bellucci =

Italian badminton player (born 1995)

Personal information
- Born: 18 December 1995 (age 30) Bologna, Italy
- Height: 1.86 m (6 ft 1 in)

Sport
- Country: Italy
- Sport: Badminton

Men's singles & doubles
- Highest ranking: 171 (MS 18 May 2017); 115 (MD 15 June 2017)
- BWF profile

Matteo Bellucci (born 18 December 1995) is an Italian badminton player.

== Career ==
In 2016, he won the men's doubles event at the Ethiopia International tournament.

== Achievements ==
=== BWF International Challenge/Series ===
Men's singles
Year	Tournament	Opponent	Score	Result
2016	Santo Domingo Open	(Italy) Kevin Strobl	21–16, 21–15	(gold) Winner

Men's doubles
Year	Tournament	Partner	Opponent	Score	Result
2016	Ethiopia International	(Italy) Fabio Caponio	(Italy) Lukas Osele (Italy) Kevin Strobl	21–17, 19–21, 21–13	(gold) Winner

BWF International Challenge tournament
BWF International Series tournament
BWF Future Series tournament
