= Thom Gicquel =

French badminton player (born 1999)

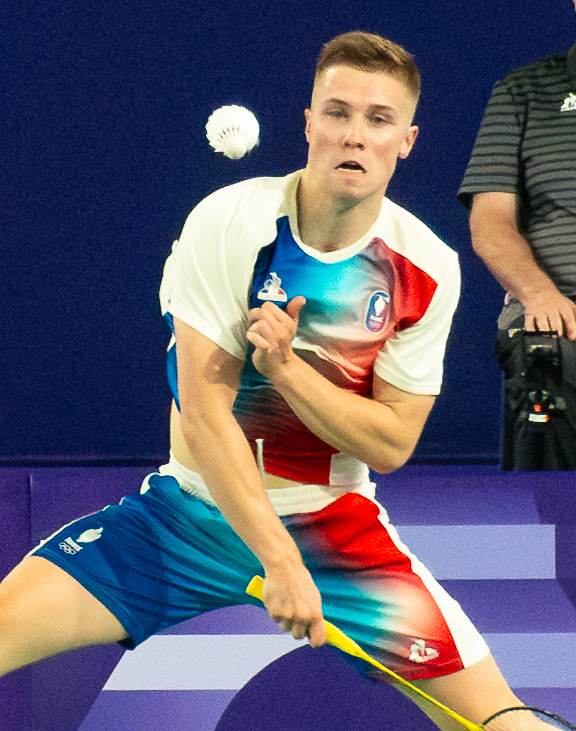
- Gicquel in 2024

Personal information
- Born: Thom Mark Gicquel; 12 January 1999 (age 27) Tours, France
- Height: 1.86 m (6 ft 1 in)
- Weight: 81 kg (179 lb)

Sport
- Country: France
- Sport: Badminton
- Handedness: Right

Men's & mixed doubles
- Highest ranking: 3 (XD with Delphine Delrue, 27 October 2026); 50 (MD with Ronan Labar, 25 October 2018)
- Current ranking: 3 (XD with Delphine Delrue, 3 November 2026)
- BWF profile
Medal record
Men's badminton
Representing France
World Championships
Gold medal – first place	2026 New Delhi	Mixed doubles
Bronze medal – third place	2025 Paris	Mixed doubles
European Games
Silver medal – second place	2023 Kraków-Małopolska	Mixed doubles
Bronze medal – third place	2019 Minsk	Mixed doubles
European Championships
Gold medal – first place	2024 Saarbrücken	Mixed doubles
Silver medal – second place	2022 Madrid	Mixed doubles
Silver medal – second place	2025 Horsens	Mixed doubles
European Mixed Team Championships
Silver medal – second place	2021 Vantaa	Mixed team
Silver medal – second place	2023 Aire-sur-la-Lys	Mixed team
Silver medal – second place	2025 Baku	Mixed team
European Men's Team Championships
Gold medal – first place	2026 Istanbul	Men's team
Silver medal – second place	2024 Łódź	Men's team
Bronze medal – third place	2018 Kazan	Men's team
Bronze medal – third place	2020 Liévin	Men's team
Mediterranean Games
Gold medal – first place	2018 Tarragona	Men's doubles
European Junior Championships
Gold medal – first place	2017 Mulhouse	Boys' doubles
Gold medal – first place	2017 Mulhouse	Mixed team
Bronze medal – third place	2015 Lubin	Mixed team

Thom Mark Gicquel (born 12 January 1999) is a French badminton player. He is the reigning World Champion, winning the mixed doubles title with Delphine Delrue in 2026. Competing in the mixed doubles, he was able to reach the top 10 of the BWF world rankings with his partner Delrue. The pair also won the gold medal in the 2024 European Championships; silver in the 2022 European Championships, and 2023 European Games; and bronze in the 2019 European Games.

Gicquel's achievements began when he still in a young age. He claimed the gold medals at the 2017 European Junior Championships in the mixed team and the boys' doubles events, and then when he had just risen to senior level, he won the men's doubles gold in the 2018 Mediterranean Games.

== Early life ==
Born in Tours, Gicquel has lived in Gosné with his parents for 5 years. In there he started playing badminton in the Betton club, alongside his parents, brothers and sisters. Competing in all three events (singles, doubles and mixed), he showed more of his talents as a doubles player when he moves to the U17 category. Partnered with Léo Rossi, he won his first U17 title at the 2015 Romanian Junior International. He was part of the national junior team that won the bronze medal at the 2015 European Junior Championships. He made his debut in the international senior tournament at the 2015 Riga International in Latvia, finished as the men's doubles runner-up partnered with Thomas Baures.

In 2016, Gicquel won the silver medal in the boys' doubles at the U17 European Junior Championships with his partner Rossi. He won his first international title at the 2016 Latvia International partnering Léonice Huet.

== Career ==
In 2017, Gicquel became the member of the national junior team that won the gold medal in European Junior Championships. He also won the gold medal in the boys' doubles event with Toma Junior Popov.

In the 2018 European Men's Team Championships, he helped the team claim the bronze medal. Teamed-up with Bastian Kersaudy, they clinched the men's doubles gold at the 2018 Mediterranean Games.

In 2019, he captured a bronze medal at the 2019 European Games in the mixed doubles event with Delphine Delrue.

Gicquel and Delrue reached a career high as world number 10 in the BWF World ranking on 9 March 2021, making them as the first ever French mixed doubles to enter the top 10 in the BWF World ranking. He competed at the 2020 Summer Olympics.

In 2026, Gicquel won the gold medal at the World Championships with parther Delrue, became the first ever French to win the world championships title. The duo beating current world number 1 Feng Yanzhe and Huang Dongping in the final.

== Achievements ==
=== BWF World Championships ===
Mixed doubles
Year	Venue	Partner	Opponent	Score	Result	Ref.
2025	Adidas Arena, Paris, France	(France) Delphine Delrue	(Malaysia) Chen Tang Jie (Malaysia) Toh Ee Wei	18–21, 16–21	Bronze	
2026	Indira Gandhi Arena, New Delhi, India	(France) Delphine Delrue	(China) Feng Yanzhe (China) Huang Dongping	22–20, 19–21, 21–15	Gold	

=== European Games ===
Mixed doubles
Year	Venue	Partner	Opponent	Score	Result
2019	Falcon Club, Minsk, Belarus	(France) Delphine Delrue	(United Kingdom) Marcus Ellis (United Kingdom) Lauren Smith	19–21, 12–21	Bronze
2023	Arena Jaskółka, Tarnów, Poland	(France) Delphine Delrue	(Netherlands) Robin Tabeling (Netherlands) Selena Piek	10–21, 21–13, 13–21	Silver

=== European Championships ===
Mixed doubles
Year	Venue	Partner	Opponent	Score	Result
2022	Polideportivo Municipal Gallur, Madrid, Spain	(France) Delphine Delrue	(Germany) Mark Lamsfuß (Germany) Isabel Lohau	21–16, 20–22, 16–21	Silver
2024	Saarlandhalle, Saarbrücken, Germany	(France) Delphine Delrue	(Denmark) Mathias Christiansen (Denmark) Alexandra Bøje	21–16, 21–15	Gold
2025	Forum, Horsens, Germany	(France) Delphine Delrue	(Denmark) Jesper Toft (Denmark) Amalie Magelund	18–21, 19–21	Silver

=== Mediterranean Games ===
Men's doubles
Year	Venue	Partner	Opponent	Score	Result
2018	El Morell Pavilion, Tarragona, Spain	(France) Bastian Kersaudy	(Turkey) Serdar Koca (Turkey) Serhat Salim	21–9, 21–19	Gold

=== European Junior Championships ===
Boys' doubles
Year	Venue	Partner	Opponent	Score	Result
2017	Centre Sportif Régional d'Alsace, Mulhouse, France	(France) Toma Junior Popov	(England) Max Flynn (England) Callum Hemming	21–17, 21–13	Gold

=== BWF World Tour (5 titles, 10 runners-up) ===
The BWF World Tour, which was announced on 19 March 2017 and implemented in 2018, is a series of elite badminton tournaments sanctioned by the Badminton World Federation (BWF). The BWF World Tour is divided into levels of World Tour Finals, Super 1000, Super 750, Super 500, Super 300 (part of the HSBC World Tour), and the BWF Tour Super 100.

Mixed doubles
Year	Tournament	Level	Partner	Opponent	Score	Result
2018	Dutch Open	Super 100	(France) Delphine Delrue	(England) Marcus Ellis (England) Lauren Smith	15–21, 15–21	(silver) Runner-up
2019	Orléans Masters	Super 100	(France) Delphine Delrue	(France) Ronan Labar (France) Anne Tran	21–11, 21–14	(gold) Winner
2019	U.S. Open	Super 300	(France) Delphine Delrue	(Chinese Taipei) Lee Jhe-huei (Chinese Taipei) Hsu Ya-ching	17–21, 17–21	(silver) Runner-up
2020	Spain Masters	Super 300	(France) Delphine Delrue	(South Korea) Kim Sa-rang (South Korea) Kim Ha-na	21–15, 11–21, 10–21	(silver) Runner-up
2021	Swiss Open	Super 300	(France) Delphine Delrue	(Denmark) Mathias Christiansen (Denmark) Alexandra Bøje	21–19, 21–19	(gold) Winner
2022	Indonesia Masters	Super 500	(France) Delphine Delrue	(China) Zheng Siwei (China) Huang Yaqiong	13–21, 14–21	(silver) Runner-up
2023	China Open	Super 1000	(France) Delphine Delrue	(South Korea) Seo Seung-jae (South Korea) Chae Yoo-jung	19–21, 12–21	(silver) Runner-up
2024	Japan Masters	Super 500	(France) Delphine Delrue	(Thailand) Dechapol Puavaranukroh (Thailand) Supissara Paewsampran	16–21, 21–10, 17–21	(silver) Runner-up
2025	India Open	Super 750	(France) Delphine Delrue	(China) Jiang Zhenbang (China) Wei Yaxin	18–21, 17–21	(silver) Runner-up
2025	Indonesia Open	Super 1000	(France) Delphine Delrue	(Thailand) Dechapol Puavaranukroh (Thailand) Supissara Paewsampran	21–16, 21–18	(gold) Winner
2025	Hylo Open	Super 500	(France) Delphine Delrue	(Denmark) Mathias Christiansen (Denmark) Alexandra Bøje	21–23, 15–21	(silver) Runner-up
2025	Japan Masters	Super 500	(France) Delphine Delrue	(Thailand) Dechapol Puavaranukroh (Thailand) Supissara Paewsampran	18–21, 21–14, 18–21	(silver) Runner-up
2026	All England Open	Super 1000	(France) Delphine Delrue	(Chinese Taipei) Ye Hong-wei (Chinese Taipei) Nicole Gonzales Chan	19–21, 18–21	(silver) Runner-up
2026	Orléans Masters	Super 300	(France) Delphine Delrue	(Denmark) Mathias Christiansen (Denmark) Alexandra Bøje	21–19, 21–13	(gold) Winner
2026	Hylo Open	Super 500	(France) Delphine Delrue	(Denmark) Jesper Toft (Denmark) Amalie Cecille Kudsk	19–21, 22–20, 21–18	(gold) Winner

=== BWF International Challenge/Series (5 titles, 5 runners-up) ===
Men's doubles
Year	Tournament	Partner	Opponent	Score	Result
2015	Riga International	(France) Thomas Baures	(Denmark) Mads Emil Christensen (Denmark) Kristoffer Knudsen	12–21, 13–21	(silver) Runner-up
2018	Czech Open	(France) Ronan Labar	(Poland) Miłosz Bochat (Poland) Adam Cwalina	21–18, 17–21, 21–15	(gold) Winner

Mixed doubles
Year	Tournament	Partner	Opponent	Score	Result
2016	Latvia International	(France) Léonice Huet	(Russia) Dmitrii Riabov (Russia) Maria Shegurova	21–15, 18–21, 21–15	(gold) Winner
2016	Swiss International	(France) Delphine Delrue	(Switzerland) Oliver Schaller (Switzerland) Céline Burkart	17–21, 21–10, 19–21	(silver) Runner-up
2017	Portugal International	(France) Delphine Delrue	(Finland) Anton Kaisti (Finland) Jenny Nyström	21–19, 19–21, 12–21	(silver) Runner-up
2018	Swedish Open	(France) Delphine Delrue	(Denmark) Kristoffer Knudsen (Denmark) Isabella Nielsen	21–16, 21–10	(gold) Winner
2018	Dutch International	(France) Delphine Delrue	(Denmark) Mathias Thyrri (Denmark) Elisa Melgaard	21–17, 21–14	(gold) Winner
2019	Polish Open	(France) Delphine Delrue	(England) Ben Lane (England) Jessica Pugh	17–21, 15–21	(silver) Runner-up
2019	Denmark International	(France) Delphine Delrue	(France) Ronan Labar (France) Anne Tran	21–19, 18–21, 15–21	(silver) Runner-up
2019	Azerbaijan International	(France) Delphine Delrue	(Germany) Mark Lamsfuß (Germany) Isabel Herttrich	9–21, 23–21, 21–15	(gold) Winner

BWF International Challenge tournament
BWF International Series tournament
BWF Future Series tournament
