= Badminton at the 2018 Mediterranean Games =

- Venue: El Morell Pavilion
- Dates: 23–26 June
- Competitors: 63 from 12 nations

The badminton tournaments at the 2018 Mediterranean Games took place between 23 and 26 June at the El Morell Pavilion in El Morell, Tarragona. This was the second time that badminton events held at the Mediterranean Games.

There are 63 athletes from 12 nations competed in four events: men's singles, women's singles, men's doubles and women's doubles.

== Medal summary ==
=== Medalists ===
Event	Gold	Silver	Bronze
Men's singles	Spain (ESP); Pablo Abián	France (FRA); Lucas Corvée	France (FRA); Toma Junior Popov
Men's doubles	France (FRA); Bastian Kersaudy; Thom Gicquel	Turkey (TUR); Serdar Koca; Serhat Salim	Italy (ITA); Lukas Osele; Kevin Strobl
Women's singles	Turkey (TUR); Neslihan Yiğit	Spain (ESP); Beatriz Corrales	Turkey (TUR); Aliye Demirbağ
Women's doubles	France (FRA); Delphine Delrue; Léa Palermo	Turkey (TUR); Bengisu Erçetin; Nazlıcan İnci	Slovenia (SLO); Iza Šalehar; Lia Šalehar

=== Medal table ===
* Host nation (Spain)

Rank	Nation	Gold	Silver	Bronze	Total
1	France	2	1	1	4
2	Turkey	1	2	1	4
3	Spain*	1	1	0	2
4	Italy	0	0	1	1
4	Slovenia	0	0	1	1
Totals (5 entries)		4	4	4	12
