= Lucas Corvée =

French badminton player (born 1993)

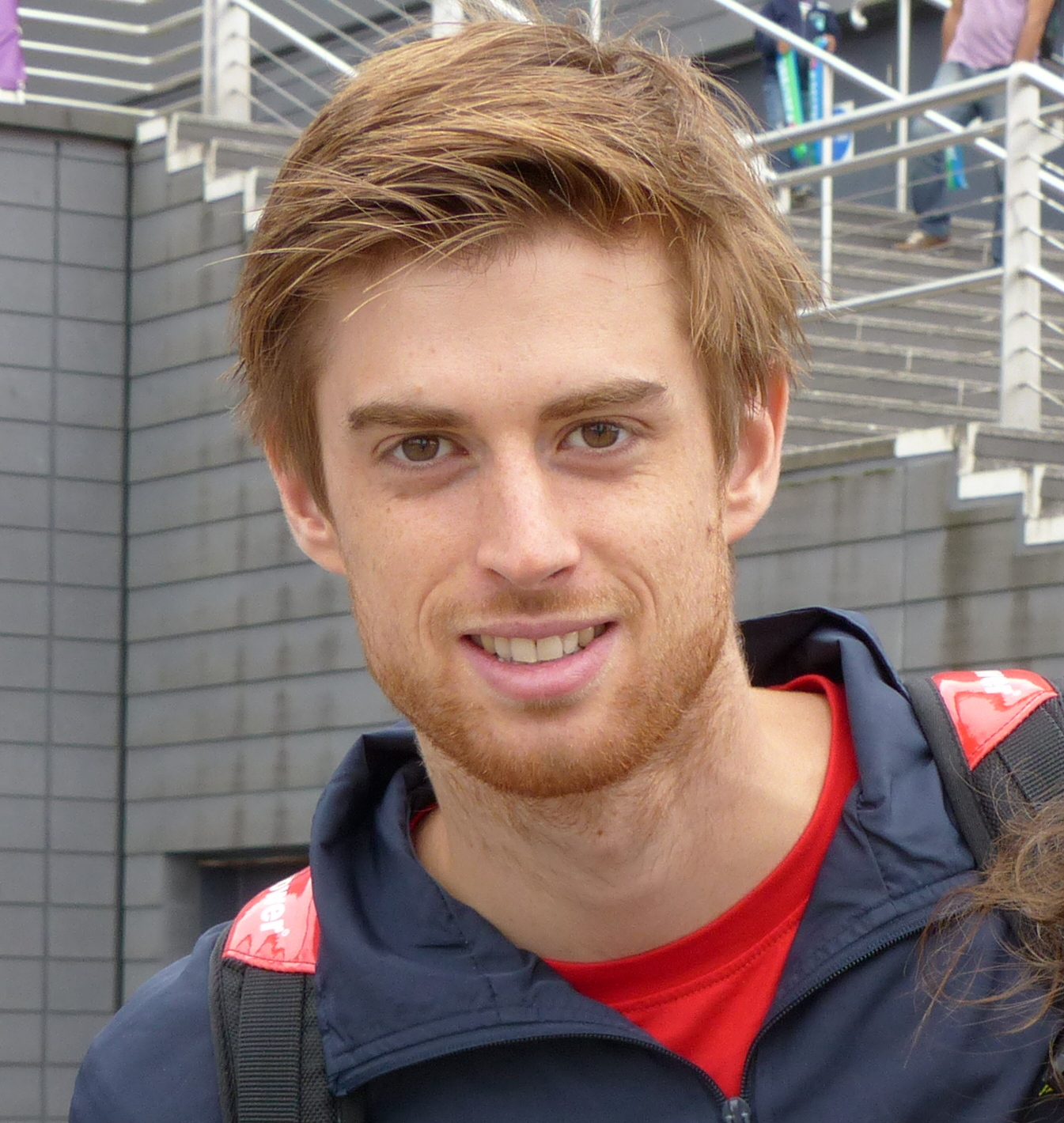
- Corvée in 2017

Personal information
- Born: Lucas Maurice Corvée; 9 June 1993 (age 33) Alençon, France
- Years active: 2010–present
- Height: 1.90 m (6 ft 3 in)
- Weight: 78 kg (172 lb)

Sport
- Country: France
- Sport: Badminton
- Handedness: Right

Men's singles & doubles
- Highest ranking: 35 (MS, 21 June 2018); 29 (MD with Ronan Labar, 11 July 2023); 55 (XD with Sharone Bauer, 24 January 2023)
- Current ranking: 43 (MD with Ronan Labar 16 July 2024)
- BWF profile
Medal record
Men's badminton
Representing France
European Men's Team Championships
Silver medal – second place	2016 Kazan	Men's team
Silver medal – second place	2024 Łódź	Men's team
Bronze medal – third place	2018 Kazan	Men's team
European Mixed Team Championships
Silver medal – second place	2023 Aire-sur-la-Lys	Mixed team
Mediterranean Games
Silver medal – second place	2018 Tarragona	Men's singles
European Junior Championships
Bronze medal – third place	2011 Vantaa	Boys' doubles

Lucas Maurice Corvée (born 9 June 1993) is a French badminton player affiliated with Issy Les Moulineaux 92 club. Corvée started playing badminton at aged 6 in Alençon badminton club. His mother also a professional badminton player. He became a member of the France national badminton team in 2010, then in 2011, he won a bronze medal at the European Junior Championships in boys' doubles event. Corvée was the champion of the 2013 Puerto Rico International tournament in the men's doubles event partnered with Brice Leverdez.

Corvée competed at the 2015 European Games in Baku, Azerbaijan. He was the men's singles silver medalist at the 2018 Mediterranean Games in Tarragona, Spain.

== Achievements ==
=== Mediterranean Games ===
Men's singles
Year	Venue	Opponent	Score	Result
2018	El Morell Pavilion; Tarragona, Spain	(Spain) Pablo Abián	23–21, 15–21, 17–21	Silver

=== European Junior Championships ===
Boys' doubles
Year	Venue	Partner	Opponent	Score	Result
2011	Energia Areena; Vantaa, Finland	(France) Joris Grosjean	(Germany) Fabian Holzer (Germany) Max Schwenger	18–21, 22–24	Bronze

=== BWF Grand Prix (1 runner-up) ===
The BWF Grand Prix had two levels, the Grand Prix and Grand Prix Gold. It was a series of badminton tournaments sanctioned by the Badminton World Federation (BWF) and played between 2007 and 2017.

Men's singles
Year	Tournament	Opponent	Score	Result
2017	Scottish Open	(England) Toby Penty	14–21, 22–24	(silver) Runner-up

BWF Grand Prix Gold tournament
BWF Grand Prix tournament

=== BWF International Challenge/Series (5 titles, 16 runners-up) ===
Men's singles
Year	Tournament	Opponent	Score	Result
2012	Irish Open	(Republic of Ireland) Scott Evans	19–21, 18–21	(silver) Runner-up
2013	Romanian International	(Japan) Takuto Inoue	21–10, 17–21, 15–21	(silver) Runner-up
2013	Slovenia International	(Malaysia) Misbun Ramdan Misbun	11–21, 12–21	(silver) Runner-up
2014	Finnish Open	(Denmark) Emil Holst	6–21, 15–21	(silver) Runner-up
2015	Peru International	(France) Thomas Rouxel	12–21, 13–21	(silver) Runner-up
2016	White Nights	(France) Lucas Claerbout	15–21, 11–21	(silver) Runner-up
2017	Orleans International	(Netherlands) Mark Caljouw	6–21, 21–18, 11–21	(silver) Runner-up
2018	Spanish International	(France) Toma Junior Popov	13–21, 17–21	(silver) Runner-up
2020	Portugal International	(France) Brice Leverdez	10–21, 12–21	(silver) Runner-up

Men's doubles
Year	Tournament	Partner	Opponent	Score	Result
2011	Estonian International	(France) Joris Grosjean	(Germany) Peter Käsbauer (Germany) Josche Zurwonne	8–21, 18–21	(silver) Runner-up
2012	Bulgarian Hebar Open	(France) Marin Baumann	(Malaysia) Tan Chun Seang (Austria) Roman Zirnwald	17–21, 21–17, 11–21	(silver) Runner-up
2013	Swiss International	(France) Brice Leverdez	(Germany) Daniel Benz (Malaysia) Chan Kwong Beng	16–21, 16–21	(silver) Runner-up
2013	Puerto Rico International	(France) Brice Leverdez	(France) Laurent Constantin (France) Matthieu Lo Ying Ping	21–14, 21–12	(gold) Winner
2015	Peru International	(France) Lucas Claerbout	(Poland) Adam Cwalina (Poland) Przemysław Wacha	18–21, 11–21	(silver) Runner-up
2020	Portugal International	(France) Brice Leverdez	(Scotland) Christopher Grimley (Scotland) Matthew Grimley	26–24, 24–22	(gold) Winner
2021	Austrian Open	(France) Ronan Labar	(Malaysia) Junaidi Arif (Malaysia) Muhammad Haikal	17–21, 15–21	(silver) Runner-up
2021	Spanish International	(France) Ronan Labar	(Malaysia) Man Wei Chong (Malaysia) Tee Kai Wun	15–21, 18–21	(silver) Runner-up
2021	Denmark Masters	(France) Ronan Labar	(Denmark) Daniel Lundgaard (Denmark) Mathias Thyrri	22–24, 19–21	(silver) Runner-up
2024	Kazakhstan International	(France) Ronan Labar	(Japan) Kakeru Kumagai (Japan) Hiroki Nishi	21–14, 21–19	(gold) Winner

Mixed doubles
Year	Tournament	Partner	Opponent	Score	Result
2022	Luxembourg Open	(France) Sharone Bauer	(Indonesia) Verrell Yustin Mulia (Indonesia) Bernadine Wardana	21–18, 17–21, 22–20	(gold) Winner
2022	Norwegian International	(France) Sharone Bauer	(Serbia) Mihajlo Tomić (Serbia) Andjela Vitman	21–19, 13–21, 21–13	(gold) Winner

BWF International Challenge tournament
BWF International Series tournament
BWF Future Series tournament
