= Fabio Caponio =

Italian badminton player (born 1999)

Personal information
- Born: 26 March 1999 (age 27) Santeramo in Colle, Italy

Sport
- Country: Italy
- Sport: Badminton

Men's singles & doubles
- Highest ranking: 83 (MS, 17 October 2023); 115 (MD with Matteo Bellucci, 15 June 2017)
- BWF profile
Medal record
Men's badminton
Representing Italy
Mediterranean Games
Gold medal – first place	2026 Taranto	Men's singles
Bronze medal – third place	2022 Oran	Men's doubles

Fabio Caponio (born 26 March 1999) is an Italian badminton player. He plays for the Italian national team as well as the Italian Air Force.

== Career ==
In 2016, he won the Ethiopia International tournament in the men's doubles event. In 2017, he won the Mauritius International tournament in the men's doubles event.

In 2022, Caponio teamed-up with Giovanni Toti won the bronze medal in the men's doubles at the 2022 Mediterranean Games. In 2023, he won the Peru International. In 2025, Caponio won the men's singles title in the Algeria International tournament.

== Achievements ==
=== Mediterranean Games ===
Men's doubles
Year	Venue	Partner	Opponent	Score	Result	Ref.
2022	Multipurpose Omnisports Hall; Oued Tlélat, Algeria	(Italy) Giovanni Toti	(Spain) Pablo Abián (Spain) Luis Enrique Peñalver	21–17, 15–21, 19–21	Bronze	

=== BWF International Challenge/Series (5 titles, 5 runners-up) ===
Men's singles
Year	Tournament	Opponent	Score	Result
2023	Chile International	(United States) Kevin Arokia Walter	21–19, 25–27, 21–19	(gold) Winner
2023	Venezuela International	(Italy) Giovanni Toti	12–21, 20–22	(silver) Runner-up
2023	Peru International	(El Salvador) Uriel Canjura	21–11, 21–18	(gold) Winner
2025	Algeria International	(Netherlands) Noah Haase	21–8, 9–21, 23–21	(gold) Winner
2026	Mexican International	(Brazil) Jonathan Matias	11–21, 14–21	(silver) Runner-up
2026	Mexican International	(United States) Jay Chun	21–15, 19–21, 16–21	(silver) Runner-up

Men's doubles
Year	Tournament	Partner	Opponent	Score	Result
2016	Ethiopia International	(Italy) Matteo Bellucci	(Italy) Lukas Osele (Italy) Kevin Strobl	21–17, 19–21, 21–13	(gold) Winner
2017	Mauritius International	(Italy) Giovanni Toti	(Mauritius) Aatish Lubah (Mauritius) Julien Paul	13–21, 23–21, 21–16	(gold) Winner
2021	Internacional Mexicano	(Italy) Giovanni Toti	(Canada) Adam Dong (Canada) Nyl Yakura	10–21, 10–21	(silver) Runner-up
2021	El Salvador International	(Italy) Giovanni Toti	(Brazil) Jonathan Matias (Brazil) Artur Silva Pomoceno	11–21, 21–14, 17–21	(silver) Runner-up

BWF International Challenge tournament
BWF International Series tournament
BWF Future Series tournament
