= Aliye Demirbağ =

Turkish badminton player (born 1998)

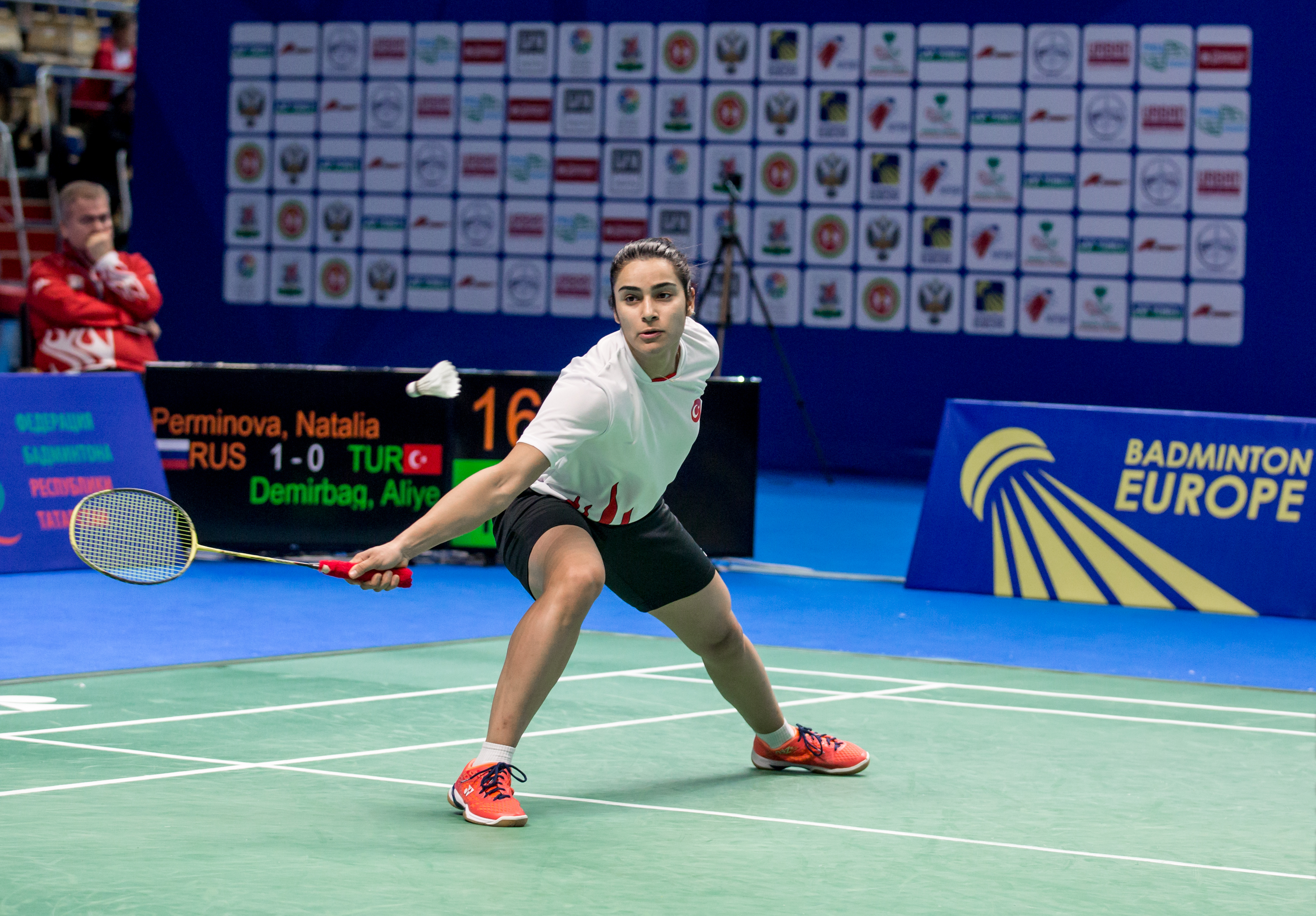
- Demirbağ at the 2018 Kazan European women's team championships

Personal information
- Born: 19 February 1998 (age 28) Elazığ, Turkey
- Height: 1.71 m (5 ft 7 in)
- Weight: 64 kg (141 lb)

Sport
- Country: Turkey
- Sport: Badminton
- Handedness: Right

Women's singles & doubles
- Highest ranking: 52 (WS 23 April 2018); 197 (WD 18 February 2015); 404 (XD 15 June 2017)
- Current ranking: 86 (WS 15 November 2022)
- BWF profile
Medal record
Women's badminton
Representing Turkey
Mediterranean Games
Bronze medal – third place	2018 Tarragona	Singles
European Junior Championships
Bronze medal – third place	2015 Lubin	Singles

Aliye Demirbağ (born 19 February 1998) is a Turkish badminton player who competed at the 2014 Summer Youth Olympics in Nanjing, China. In 2015, she won the bronze medal at the European Junior Championships in Lubin, Poland. She competed at the 2018 Mediterranean Games, and grab the women's singles bronze medal.

== Achievements ==
=== Mediterranean Games ===
Women's singles
Year	Venue	Opponent	Score	Result
2018	El Morell Pavilion; Tarragona, Spain	(France) Yaëlle Hoyaux	21–17, 21–19	Bronze

=== European Junior Championships ===
Girls' singles
Year	Venue	Opponent	Score	Result
2015	Regional Sport Centrum Hall; Lubin, Poland	(Denmark) Julie Dawall Jakobsen	14–21, 16–21	Bronze

=== BWF International Challenge/Series (4 titles, 3 runners-up) ===
Women's singles
Year	Tournament	Opponent	Score	Result
2017	Hellas International	(Turkey) Büşra Yalçınkaya	21–13, 21–11	(gold) Winner
2017	Egypt International	(Turkey) Cemre Fere	21–15, 21–13	(gold) Winner
2017	Hungarian International	(Turkey) Neslihan Yiğit	11–21, 21–17, 18–21	(silver) Runner-up
2018	Kharkiv International	(Turkey) Özge Bayrak	22–20, 18–21, 14–21	(silver) Runner-up
2019	Turkey Open	(Turkey) Neslihan Yiğit	14–21, 20–22	(silver) Runner-up
2022	Ukraine Open	(Canada) Wen Yu Zhang	21–13, 21–16	(gold) Winner

Mixed doubles
Year	Tournament	Partner	Opponent	Score	Result
2017	Hellas International	(Turkey) Osman Uyhan	(Turkey) Serdar Koca (Turkey) Emine Demirtaş	21–16, 21–14	(gold) Winner

BWF International Challenge tournament
BWF International Series tournament
BWF Future Series tournament
