= Kevin Strobl =

Italian badminton player

Personal information
- Born: 26 August 1997 (age 29) Silandro, Italy
- Height: 1.70 m (5 ft 7 in)
- Weight: 65 kg (143 lb)

Sport
- Country: Italy
- Sport: Badminton
- Handedness: Right

Men's singles & doubles
- Highest ranking: 219 (MS 25 May 2017); 82 (MD 21 September 2017); 136 (XD 21 December 2017)
- BWF profile
Medal record
Men's badminton
Representing Italy
Mediterranean Games
Bronze medal – third place	2018 Tarragona	Men's doubles

Kevin Strobl (born 26 August 1997) is an Italian badminton player. He competed at the 2018 Mediterranean Games, and won the men's doubles bronze medal partnered with Lukas Osele.

== Career ==
In 2016, he became the runner-up of Ethiopia International tournament in men's doubles event.

== Achievements ==
=== Mediterranean Games ===
Men's doubles
Year	Venue	Partner	Opponent	Score	Result
2018	El Morell Pavilion; Tarragona, Spain	(Italy) Lukas Osele	(Portugal) Duarte Nuno Anjo (Portugal) Bernardo Atilano	9–21, 21–18, 21–17	Bronze

=== BWF International Challenge/Series ===
Men's singles
Year	Tournament	Opponent	Score	Result
2016	Santo Domingo Open	(Italy) Matteo Bellucci	16–21, 15–21	(silver) Runner-up

Men's doubles
Year	Tournament	Partner	Opponent	Score	Result
2016	Ethiopia International	(Italy) Lukas Osele	(Italy) Matteo Bellucci (Italy) Fabio Caponio	17–21, 21–19, 13–21	(silver) Runner-up
2016	Santo Domingo Open	(Italy) Lukas Osele	(Dominican Republic) William Cabrera (Dominican Republic) Nelson Javier	16–21, 15–21	(silver) Runner-up
2017	Giraldilla International	(Italy) Lukas Osele	(Cuba) Osleni Guerrero (Cuba) Leodannis Martínez	11–21, 24–22, 8–21	(silver) Runner-up

BWF International Challenge tournament
BWF International Series tournament
BWF Future Series tournament
