= Lukas Osele =

Italian badminton player (born 1997)

Personal information
- Born: 30 September 1997 (age 29) Bolzano, Italy
- Years active: 2014
- Height: 1.80 m (5 ft 11 in)
- Weight: 67 kg (148 lb)

Sport
- Country: Italy
- Sport: Badminton
- Handedness: Right

Men's singles & doubles
- Highest ranking: 256 (MS 22 June 2017); 82 (MD 21 September 2017); 146 (XD 8 March 2018)
- BWF profile
Medal record
Men's badminton
Representing Italy
Mediterranean Games
| Bronze medal – third place | 2018 Tarragona | Men's doubles |

Lukas Osele (born 30 September 1997) is an Italian badminton player. He competed at the 2018 Mediterranean Games, and won the men's doubles bronze medal partnered with Kevin Strobl.

== Career ==
In 2016, he became the runner-up of Ethiopia International tournament in men's doubles event.

== Achievements ==
=== Mediterranean Games ===
Men's doubles
| Year | Venue | Partner | Opponent | Score | Result |
|---|---|---|---|---|---|
| 2018 | El Morell Pavilion; Tarragona, Spain | (Italy) Kevin Strobl | (Portugal) Duarte Nuno Anjo (Portugal) Bernardo Atilano | 9–21, 21–18, 21–17 | Bronze |

=== BWF International Challenge/Series ===
Men's doubles
| Year | Tournament | Partner | Opponent | Score | Result |
|---|---|---|---|---|---|
| 2016 | Ethiopia International | (Italy) Kevin Strobl | (Italy) Matteo Bellucci (Italy) Fabio Caponio | 17–21, 21–19, 13–21 | (silver) Runner-up |
| 2016 | Santo Domingo Open | (Italy) Kevin Strobl | (Dominican Republic) William Cabrera (Dominican Republic) Nelson Javier | 16–21, 15–21 | (silver) Runner-up |
| 2017 | Giraldilla International | (Italy) Kevin Strobl | (Cuba) Osleni Guerrero (Cuba) Leodannis Martínez | 11–21, 24–22, 8–21 | (silver) Runner-up |

BWF International Challenge tournament
BWF International Series tournament
BWF Future Series tournament
