= Serdar Koca =

Turkish badminton player (born 1994)

Personal information
- Born: 28 February 1994 (age 32) Bursa, Turkey
- Height: 1.86 m (6 ft 1 in)
- Weight: 85 kg (187 lb)

Sport
- Country: Turkey
- Sport: Badminton

Men's & mixed doubles
- Highest ranking: 199 (MD 24 December 2019); 132 (XD 25 August 2016)
- BWF profile
Medal record
Men's badminton
Representing Turkey
Mediterranean Games
Silver medal – second place	2018 Tarragona	Doubles

Serdar Koca (born 28 February 1994) is a Turkish badminton player from Bursa. He competed at the 2018 Mediterranean Games, and won the silver medal in the men's doubles event partnered with Serhat Salim.

== Achievements ==
=== Mediterranean Games ===
Men's doubles
Year	Venue	Partner	Opponent	Score	Result
2018	El Morell Pavilion; Tarragona, Spain	(Turkey) Serhat Salim	(France) Thom Gicquel (France) Bastian Kersaudy	9–21, 19–21	Silver

=== BWF International Challenge/Series (3 runners-up) ===
Men's doubles
Year	Tournament	Partner	Opponent	Score	Result
2019	Turkey Open	(Turkey) Serhat Salim	(Denmark) Mikkel Stoffersen (Denmark) Mads Vestergaard	19–21, 8–21	(silver) Runner-up

Mixed doubles
Year	Tournament	Partner	Opponent	Score	Result
2015	Turkey International	(Turkey) Emine Demirtaş	(Turkey) Melih Turgut (Turkey) Fatma Nur Yavuz	14–21, 22–20, 11–21	(silver) Runner-up
2017	Hellas International	(Turkey) Emine Demirtaş	(Turkey) Osman Uyhan (Turkey) Aliye Demirbağ	16–21, 14–21	(silver) Runner-up

BWF International Challenge tournament
BWF International Series tournament
BWF Future Series tournament
