= Pablo Abián =

Spanish badminton player (born 1985)

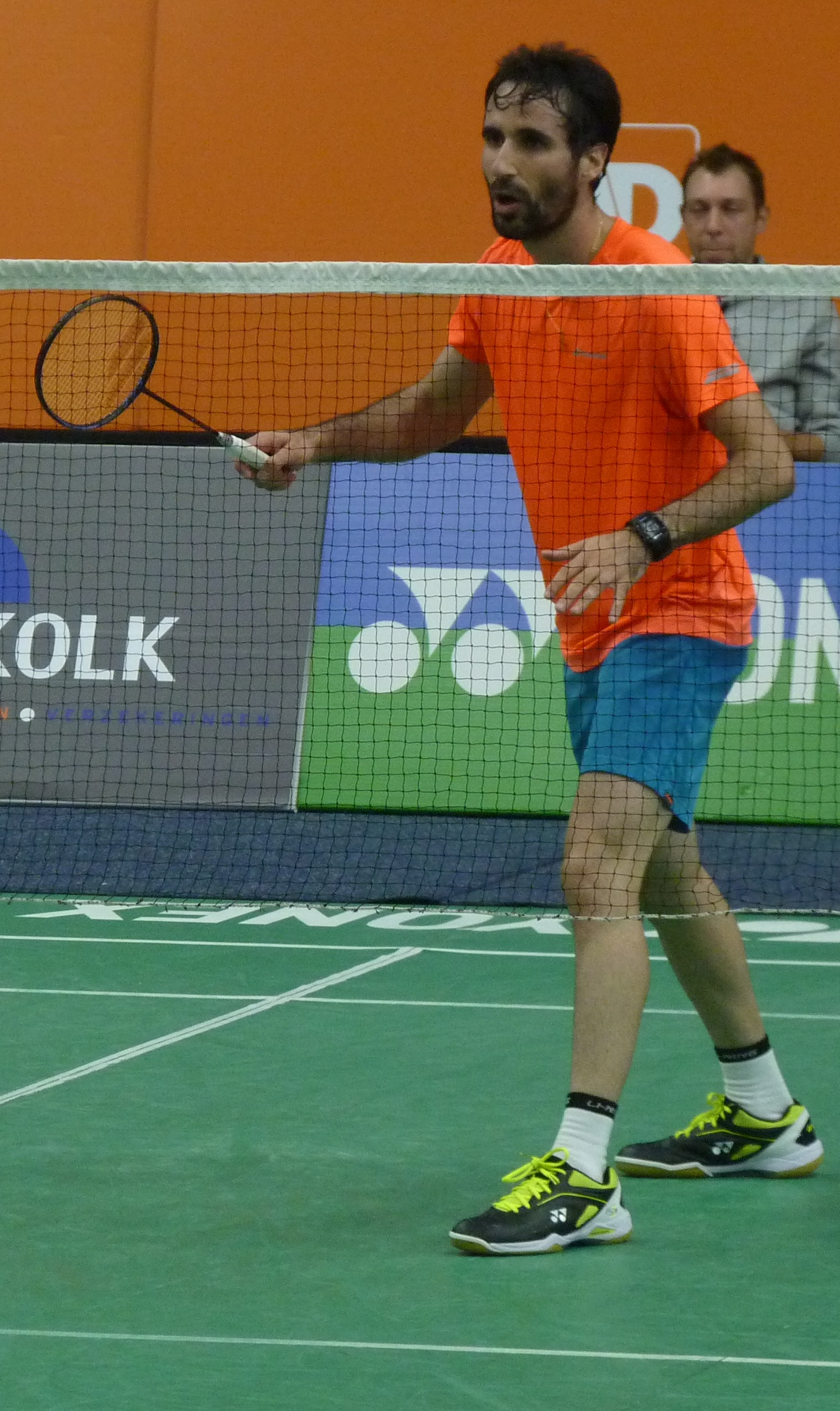

Personal information
- Born: Pablo Abián Vicén; 12 June 1985 (age 41) Calatayud, Spain
- Height: 1.77 m (5 ft 10 in)
- Weight: 78 kg (172 lb)

Sport
- Country: Spain
- Sport: Badminton
- Handedness: Right

Men's singles
- Highest ranking: 20 (8 September 2011)
- Current ranking: 63 (16 July 2023)
- BWF profile
Medal record
Men's badminton
Representing Spain
European Games
Gold medal – first place	2015 Baku	Men's singles
Mediterranean Games
Gold medal – first place	2018 Tarragona	Men's singles
Gold medal – first place	2022 Oran	Men's singles
Silver medal – second place	2013 Mersin	Men's singles
Silver medal – second place	2022 Oran	Men's doubles
Bronze medal – third place	2026 Taranto	Men's singles

Pablo Abián Vicén (Note: In this Spanish name, the first or paternal surname is Abián and the second or maternal family name is Vicén.) (Spanish pronunciation: [ˈpaβlo aˈβjan]; born 12 June 1985) is a Spanish badminton player. He was the men's singles gold medalists at the 2015 European Games, 2018 and 2022 Mediterranean Games.

== Olympic Games ==
=== 2008 (Beijing, China) ===
He competed in badminton at the 2008 Summer Olympics in the men's singles and was defeated in the first round by Kęstutis Navickas (Lithuania), 23–21, 12–21, 21–9.

=== 2012 (London, Great Britain) ===
He competed in badminton at the 2012 Summer Olympics in the men's singles. He was the first Spanish man to win a match at an Olympic Games. He won in the first round against Petr Koukal (Czech Republic), 21–17, 16–21, 21–16, then he lost in the next match, against the 2004 Athens Olympics gold medalist Taufik Hidayat (Indonesia), 20–22, 11–21 after having a notable performance in first set where he earned a set point but putting a relatively easy smash into the net.

=== 2016 (Rio de Janeiro, Brazil) ===
He won his first match 21–12 and 21–10 against Jaspar Yu Woon Chai (Brunei) in the group stage, and lost his second encounter 18–21 and 19–21 to Hu Yun (Hong Kong) after having a good lead in both sets.

=== 2020 (Tokyo, Japan) ===
Abián competed in the men's singles event at the 2020 Summer Olympics. He won his first match 21–7 and 21–11 against Raul Must (Estonia) in the group stage, and lost his second encounter 11–21 and 10–21 to Chen Long (China)

=== 2024 (Paris, France) ===
Abián competed in the men's singles event at the 2024 Summer Olympics.

== World Championships ==
=== 2006 (Madrid, Spain) ===
Abián played at the 2006 IBF World Championships in the men's singles, and he was defeated in the first round by Andrew Smith of England, 21–15, 21–13.

=== 2007 (Kuala Lumpur, Malaysia) ===
The following year he competed at the 2007 BWF World Championships in the men's singles again. He beat Luka Petrič 21–9, 29–27 in the first round. In the second round, he was beaten by Simon Santoso of Indonesia 18–21, 15–21.

=== 2010 (Paris, France) ===
Abián competed at the 2010 BWF World Championships in the men's singles. In the first round, he won against Magnus Sahlberg of Sweden 21–15, 21–16, and was beaten in the second round by Marc Zwiebler of Germany with the score of 17–21, 18–21.

=== 2011 (London, England) ===
Abián played the 2011 BWF World Championships in the men's singles. In the first round, he beat Yuhan Tan 16–21, 21–17, 21–15. In the second round he won against Marc Zwiebler 21–17, 7–21, 24–22. In the last sixteen he lost against Kevin Cordón (Guatemala) 19–21, 21–19, 17–21.

=== 2013 (Guangzhou, China) ===
Abián played in the 2013 BWF World Championships in the men's singles. In the first round, he won against Osleni Guerrero (Cuba) by 21–14, 23–21. In the second round, he beat Ajay Jayaram (India) by 21–9, 21–17. In the last sixteen, he lost against Nguyễn Tiến Minh (Vietnam) 21–15, 9–21, 10–21.

== European Championships ==
In 2008, Abián was 5th in the European Championship (Herning, Denmark). In the first round he beat Atli Jóhannesson (Iceland) by 21–12, 21–8. In the second round he beath Aamir Ghaffar (England) by 22–20, 21–19. In the last sixteen he beat Steinar Klausen (Norway) 21–8, 21–9. In the quarter-finals he lost against Przemysław Wacha (Poland) 11–21, 17–21.

Abián played at the Master European Circuit Finals in 2010 (Netherlands), he lost in the final against Rune Ulsing (Denmark).

Abián finished first in the European Ranking in the season 2010/2011.

== World University Championships, Universiade Games and Mediterranean Games ==
Abián reached 5th place in the 2010 World University Championship (Chinese Taipei).

He achieved 5th place in the 2011 Summer Universiade (Shenzhen, China). He lost in the quarter-final against Wen Kai (China) by 12–21, 21–23.

Abián won the silver medal at the 2012 World University Championship (Gwangju, Korea). He lost the final against Wen Kai (China) by 16–21, 8–21.

He won the silver medal at the 2013 Mediterranean Games played in Mersin (Turkey).

== Achievements ==
=== European Games ===
Men's singles
Year	Venue	Opponent	Score	Result	Ref.
2015	Baku Sports Hall; Baku, Azerbaijan	(Denmark) Emil Holst	21–12, 23–21	Gold	

=== Mediterranean Games ===
Men's singles
Year	Venue	Opponent	Score	Result	Ref.
2013	Mersin University Hall; Mersin, Turkey	(France) Brice Leverdez	17–21, 21–23	Silver	
2018	El Morell Pavilion; Tarragona, Spain	(France) Lucas Corvée	21–23, 21–15, 21–17	Gold	
2022	Multipurpose Omnisports Hall; Oued Tlélat, Algeria	(Spain) Luis Enrique Peñalver	21–13, 22–20	Gold	

Men's doubles
Year	Venue	Partner	Opponent	Score	Result	Ref.
2022	Multipurpose Omnisports Hall; Oued Tlélat, Algeria	(Spain) Luis Enrique Peñalver	(Algeria) Koceila Mammeri (Algeria) Youcef Sabri Medel	21–14, 19–21, 16–21	Silver	

=== BWF Grand Prix (1 runner-up) ===
The BWF Grand Prix had two levels, the Grand Prix and Grand Prix Gold. It was a series of badminton tournaments sanctioned by the Badminton World Federation (BWF) and played between 2007 and 2017.

Men's singles
Year	Tournament	Opponent	Score	Result
2015	Brasil Open	(China) Lin Dan	13–21, 17–21	(silver) Runner-up

BWF Grand Prix Gold tournament
BWF Grand Prix tournament

=== BWF International Challenge/Series (29 titles, 17 runners-up) ===
Men's singles
Year	Tournament	Opponent	Score	Result
2005	Brazil International	(Denmark) Janek Roos	15–1, 15–6	(gold) Winner
2006	Giraldilla International	(Cuba) Ilian Perez		(gold) Winner
2006	Lithuanian International	(Lithuania) Kęstutis Navickas	15–21, 12–21	(silver) Runner-up
2006	Latvia Riga International	(Ukraine) Vladislav Druzchenko		(gold) Winner
2007	Bahrain Satellite	(Japan) Sho Sasaki	10–21, 11–21	(silver) Runner-up
2007	Giraldilla International	(Spain) Ernesto Velázquez	20–22, 21–15, 21–9	(gold) Winner
2007	Nouméa International	(India) Arvind Bhat	16–21, 21–17, 19–21	(silver) Runner-up
2007	Ballarat International	(Spain) Carlos Longo	21–18, 21–12	(gold) Winner
2007	Waikato International	(Singapore) Ashton Chen	17–21, 17–21	(silver) Runner-up
2010	Polish Open	(Japan) Hiroyuki Saeki	21–12, 21–10	(gold) Winner
2010	Slovenian International	(Italy) Wisnu Haryo Putro	21–14, 21–4	(gold) Winner
2010	Welsh International	(Germany) Sven-Eric Kastens	14–21, 21–17, 21–14	(gold) Winner
2010	Irish Open	(Denmark) Hans-Kristian Vittinghus	13–21, 21–14, 21–23	(silver) Runner-up
2010	Italian International	(Poland) Przemysław Wacha	13–21, 16–21	(silver) Runner-up
2011	Swedish Masters	(Denmark) Viktor Axelsen	21–19, 21–6	(gold) Winner
2011	Polish Open	(Russia) Vladimir Ivanov	21–14, 21–12	(gold) Winner
2011	Morocco International	(Denmark) Joachim Persson	21–19, 17–21, 21–19	(gold) Winner
2011	Spanish International	(Denmark) Viktor Axelsen	11–21, 21–7, 9–21	(silver) Runner-up
2011	Maldives International	(India) Chetan Anand	21–15, 21–16	(gold) Winner
2011	Italian International	(Finland) Ville Lång	13–21, 21–14, 21–13	(gold) Winner
2013	Portugal International	(Malaysia) Misbun Ramdan Mohmed Misbun	8–21, 9–21	(silver) Runner-up
2013	Welsh International	(Denmark) Flemming Quach	21–12, 21–13	(gold) Winner
2014	Orleans International	(Russia) Vladimir Malkov	21–16, 19–21, 22–20	(gold) Winner
2014	Guatemala International	(Guatemala) Kevin Cordón	4–11, 11–8, 11–5, 11–10	(gold) Winner
2015	Swedish Masters	(England) Rajiv Ouseph	15–21, 17–21	(silver) Runner-up
2015	Spanish International	(Denmark) Rasmus Fladberg	21–16, 13–21, 21–10	(gold) Winner
2015	Bulgarian International	(India) Gurusai Dutt	21–17, 16–21, 21–19	(gold) Winner
2015	Chile International Challenge	(Spain) Ernesto Velázquez	21–14, 21–17	(gold) Winner
2016	Dutch International	(Scotland) Kieran Merrilees	21–16, 21–15	(gold) Winner
2016	Czech International	(Germany) Fabian Roth	10–21, 21–17, 21–15	(gold) Winner
2016	Welsh International	(Scotland) Kieran Merrilees	21–16, 21–16	(gold) Winner
2017	Austrian Open	(Japan) Kanta Tsuneyama	10–21, 21–12, 11–21	(silver) Runner-up
2017	White Nights	(France) Thomas Rouxel	15–21, 21–15, 21–18	(gold) Winner
2017	Hungarian International	(Denmark) Victor Svendsen	13–21, 21–15, 12–21	(silver) Runner-up
2017	Italian International	(Germany) Lars Schänzler	18–21, 21–16, 21–14	(gold) Winner
2018	Slovenian International	(England) Toby Penty	18–21, 18–21	(silver) Runner-up
2018	White Nights	(India) Ajay Jayaram	11–21, 21–16, 21–17	(gold) Winner
2019	Algeria International	(Azerbaijan) Ade Resky Dwicahyo	21–8, 21–6	(gold) Winner
2019	Hungarian International	(Denmark) Victor Svendsen	17–21, 21–15, 21–12	(gold) Winner
2019	Irish Open	(France) Toma Junior Popov	10–21, 22–24	(silver) Runner-up
2020	Austrian Open	(Germany) Max Weißkirchen	20–22, 15–21	(silver) Runner-up
2021	Polish Open	(Malaysia) Ng Tze Yong	19–21, 11–21	(silver) Runner-up
2021	Spanish International	(Czech Republic) Jan Louda	22–20, 20–22, 21–14	(gold) Winner
2023	Lagos International	(Brazil) Jonathan Matias	18–21, 19–21	(silver) Runner-up
2024	Swedish Open	(Indonesia) Andi Fadel Muhammad	23–21, 21–19	(gold) Winner
2024	Nantes International	(France) Alex Lanier	14–21, 13–21	(silver) Runner-up

BWF International Challenge tournament
BWF International Series tournament
BWF Future Series tournament

=== Spanish National Championship ===
Host city	Result	Event	Year	Final	Score
Santiago de Compostela	1	Mixed doubles	2004	Perez-Abián vs Villar-Chan	15–12, 15–9
Alicante	1	Men's singles	2007	Pablo Abián vs Jose Antonio Crespo	21–10, 21–16
Ibiza	1	Men's singles	2008	Pablo Abián vs Sergio Llopis	21–17, 21–15
Alicante	1	Men's singles	2009	Pablo Abián vs Sergio Llopis	21–10, 21–14
Huelva	1	Men's singles	2010	Pablo Abián vs David Leal	21–7, 21–17
Huelva	1	Men's doubles	2010	Pablo Abián and Javier Abián vs David Leal and Eliezer Ojeda	14–21, 21–17, 21–12
Madrid	1	Men's singles	2011	Pablo Abián vs Ernesto Velázquez	21–17, 21–12
Huesca	1	Men's singles	2012	Pablo Abián vs Jesús Lorenzo	21–12, 21–12
Huesca	1	Men's doubles	2012	Pablo Abián and Javier Abián vs Vicent Martinez and Eliezer Ojeda	21–15, 21–8
A Estrada	1	Men's singles	2013	Pablo Abián vs Ernesto Velázquez	21–13, 21–15
A Estrada	1	Men's doubles	2013	Pablo Abián and Javier Abián vs Daniel Sánchez and Alberto Zapico	21–12, 21–14
