= 2019 European Mixed Team Badminton Championships group stage =

The following results are the 2019 European Mixed Team Badminton Championships's main draw.

== Groups ==
The groups were published on 13 December 2018.

Group	Team
1	Denmark (H); France; Netherlands; Spain
2	England; Russia; Ireland; Germany

== Results ==
=== Group 1 ===
Pos	Team	Pld	W	L	MF	MA	MD	GF	GA	GD	PF	PA	PD	Pts	Qualification
1	Denmark (H)	3	3	0	13	2	+11	28	7	+21	711	513	+198	3	Knockout Stage
2	Netherlands	3	2	1	8	7	+1	19	17	+2	652	654	−2	2	Knockout Stage
3	France	3	1	2	6	9	−3	15	20	−5	621	658	−37	1	
4	Spain	3	0	3	3	12	−9	8	26	−18	513	712	−199	0	

Source: TS
(H) Host
- Denmark vs. France

Denmark
4
Frederiksberghallen, Court 1
13 February 2019 18:00 UTC+1

France
1

			1	2	3
1	(Denmark) (France)	Anders Antonsen; Lucas Corvée	21; 15	21; 16
2	(Denmark) (France)	Line Kjærsfeldt; Léonice Huet	21; 12	21; 8
3	(Denmark) (France)	Anders Skaarup Rasmussen / Frederik Søgaard; Thom Gicquel / Ronan Labar	21; 17	21; 18
4	(Denmark) (France)	Maiken Fruergaard / Rikke Søby Hansen; Émilie Lefel / Anne Tran	21; 23	21; 15	20; 22
5	(Denmark) (France)	Mathias Christiansen / Christinna Pedersen; Thom Gicquel / Delphine Delrue	21; 9	21; 9

- Netherlands vs. Spain

Netherlands
3
Frederiksberghallen, Court 2
13 February 2019 18:00 UTC+1

Spain
2

			1	2	3
1	(Netherlands) (Spain)	Gayle Mahulette; Sara Peñalver	13; 21	19; 21
2	(Netherlands) (Spain)	Mark Caljouw; Pablo Abián	21; 9	21; 19
3	(Netherlands) (Spain)	Selena Piek / Cheryl Seinen; Paula Lopez / Lorena Uslé	21; 13	21; 6
4	(Netherlands) (Spain)	Jelle Maas / Robin Tabeling; Luís Enrique Peñalver / Alberto Zapico	21; 13	21; 12
5	(Netherlands) (Spain)	Jacco Arends / Debora Jille; Pablo Abián / Lorena Uslé	17; 21	21; 19	17; 21

- Denmark vs. Netherlands

Denmark
4
Frederiksberghallen, Court 1
14 February 2019 18:00 UTC+1

Netherlands
1

			1	2	3
1	(Denmark) (Netherlands)	Viktor Axelsen; Joran Kweekel	21; 11	21; 8
2	(Denmark) (Netherlands)	Mia Blichfeldt; Gayle Mahulette	21; 13	21; 14
3	(Denmark) (Netherlands)	Anders Skaarup Rasmussen / Frederik Søgaard; Jacco Arends / Ruben Jille	17; 21	21; 13	21; 9
4	(Denmark) (Netherlands)	Maiken Fruergaard / Rikke Søby Hansen; Debora Jille / Cheryl Seinen	21; 16	15; 21	17; 21
5	(Denmark) (Netherlands)	Mathias Christiansen / Christinna Pedersen; Robin Tabeling / Selena Piek	21; 23	21; 16	21; 16

- France vs. Spain

France
4
Frederiksberghallen, Court 2
14 February 2019 18:00 UTC+1

Spain
1

			1	2	3
1	(France) (Spain)	Marie Batomene; Clara Azurmendi	21; 7	21; 17
2	(France) (Spain)	Toma Junior Popov; Pablo Abián	21; 12	18; 21	11; 21
3	(France) (Spain)	Delphine Delrue / Léa Palermo; Paula Lopez / Lorena Uslé	17; 21	21; 17	21; 9
4	(France) (Spain)	Bastian Kersaudy / Julien Maio; Luís Enrique Peñalver / Alberto Zapico	21; 17	21; 15
5	(France) (Spain)	Thom Gicquel / Delphine Delrue; Pablo Abián / Lorena Uslé	21; 15	21; 11

- Denmark vs. Spain

Denmark
5
Frederiksberghallen, Court 1
15 February 2019 18:00 UTC+1

Spain
0

			1	2	3
1	(Denmark) (Spain)	Mathias Christiansen / Christinna Pedersen; Alberto Zapico / Lorena Uslé	21; 11	21; 11
2	(Denmark) (Spain)	Rasmus Gemke; Luís Enrique Peñalver	12; 21	21; 16	21; 13
3	(Denmark) (Spain)	Mia Blichfeldt; Sara Peñalver	21; 11	21; 14
4	(Denmark) (Spain)	David Daugaard / Frederik Søgaard; Manuel Vazquez / Alberto Zapico	21; 11	21; 5
5	(Denmark) (Spain)	Julie Dawall Jakobsen / Rikke Søby Hansen; Paula Lopez / Lorena Uslé	21; 16	21; 18

- France vs. Netherlands

France
1
Frederiksberghallen, Court 2
15 February 2019 18:00 UTC+1

Netherlands
4

			1	2	3
1	(France) (Netherlands)	Thom Gicquel / Delphine Delrue; Robin Tabeling / Selena Piek	15; 21	21; 17	17; 21
2	(France) (Netherlands)	Toma Junior Popov; Mark Caljouw	19; 21	16; 21
3	(France) (Netherlands)	Marie Batomene; Gayle Mahulette	21; 14	21; 17
4	(France) (Netherlands)	Thom Gicquel / Ronan Labar; Jelle Maas / Robin Tabeling	21; 17	19; 21	21; 23
5	(France) (Netherlands)	Émilie Lefel / Anne Tran; Selena Piek / Cheryl Seinen	17; 21	14; 21

=== Group 2 ===
Pos	Team	Pld	W	L	MF	MA	MD	GF	GA	GD	PF	PA	PD	Pts	Qualification
1	Russia	3	3	0	12	3	+9	24	9	+15	667	572	+95	3	Knockout Stage
2	Germany	3	2	1	7	8	−1	17	16	+1	636	594	+42	2	Knockout Stage
3	England	3	1	2	9	6	+3	19	12	+7	619	540	+79	1	
4	Ireland	3	0	3	2	13	−11	4	27	−23	417	633	−216	0	

Source: TS
- England vs. Russia

England
2
Frederiksberghallen, Court 1
13 February 2019 14:00 UTC+1

Russia
3

			1	2	3
1	(England) (Russia)	Marcus Ellis / Lauren Smith; Vladimir Ivanov / Ekaterina Bolotova	15; 21	24; 26
2	(England) (Russia)	Toby Penty; Vladimir Malkov	21; 18	21; 16
3	(England) (Russia)	Chloe Birch; Evgeniya Kosetskaya	18; 21	21; 18	19; 21
4	(England) (Russia)	Marcus Ellis / Chris Langridge; Vladimir Ivanov / Ivan Sozonov	17; 21	12; 21
5	(England) (Russia)	Chloe Birch / Lauren Smith; Ekaterina Bolotova / Alina Davletova	21; 17	21; 17

- Ireland vs. Germany

Ireland
1
Frederiksberghallen, Court 2
13 February 2019 14:00 UTC+1

Germany
4

			1	2	3
1	(Republic of Ireland) (Germany)	Nhat Nguyen; Max Weißkirchen	21; 19	10; 21	21; 10
2	(Republic of Ireland) (Germany)	Sara Boyle; Yvonne Li	5; 21	4; 21
3	(Republic of Ireland) (Germany)	Joshua Magee / Paul Reynolds; Mark Lamsfuß / Jan Colin Völker	9; 21	12; 21
4	(Republic of Ireland) (Germany)	Sara Boyle / Rachael Darragh; Johanna Goliszewski / Lara Käpplein	18; 21	15; 21
5	(Republic of Ireland) (Germany)	Sam Magee / Chloe Magee; Marvin Emil Seidel / Linda Efler	19; 21	16; 21

- England vs. Ireland

England
5
Frederiksberghallen, Court 2
14 February 2019 14:00 UTC+1

Ireland
0

			1	2	3
1	(England) (Republic of Ireland)	Chloe Birch; Rachael Darragh	21; 8	21; 8
2	(England) (Republic of Ireland)	Rajiv Ouseph; Nhat Nguyen	23; 21	21; 11
3	(England) (Republic of Ireland)	Jessica Pugh / Lauren Smith; Sara Boyle / Rachael Darragh	21; 9	21; 17
4	(England) (Republic of Ireland)	Chris Adcock / Chris Langridge; Joshua Magee / Paul Reynolds	21; 10	21; 8
5	(England) (Republic of Ireland)	Marcus Ellis / Lauren Smith; Sam Magee / Chloe Magee	21; 12	21; 16

- Russia vs. Germany

Russia
5
Frederiksberghallen, Court 1
14 February 2019 14:00 UTC+1

Germany
0

			1	2	3
1	(Russia) (Germany)	Vladimir Ivanov / Ekaterina Bolotova; Marvin Emil Seidel / Linda Efler	21; 18	21; 16
2	(Russia) (Germany)	Vladimir Malkov; Max Weißkirchen	22; 20	21; 12
3	(Russia) (Germany)	Evgeniya Kosetskaya; Yvonne Li	21; 18	21; 15
4	(Russia) (Germany)	Vladimir Ivanov / Ivan Sozonov; Mark Lamsfuß / Marvin Emil Seidel	21; 13	13; 21	27; 25
5	(Russia) (Germany)	Ekaterina Bolotova / Alina Davletova; Linda Efler / Isabel Herttrich	14; 21	21; 14	24; 22

- England vs. Germany

England
2
Frederiksberghallen, Court 1
15 February 2019 14:00 UTC+1

Germany
3

			1	2	3
1	(England) (Germany)	Marcus Ellis / Lauren Smith; Marvin Emil Seidel / Linda Efler	21; 17	21; 15
2	(England) (Germany)	Rajiv Ouseph; Kai Schäfer	18; 21	24; 26
3	(England) (Germany)	Chloe Birch; Yvonne Li	25; 27	18; 21
4	(England) (Germany)	Marcus Ellis / Chris Langridge; Mark Lamsfuß / Marvin Emil Seidel	18; 21	10; 21
5	(England) (Germany)	Chloe Birch / Lauren Smith; Linda Efler / Isabel Herttrich	21; 17	21; 17

- Russia vs. Ireland

Russia
4
Frederiksberghallen, Court 2
15 February 2019 14:00 UTC+1

Ireland
1

			1	2	3
1	(Russia) (Republic of Ireland)	Anastasiia Semenova; Sara Boyle	18; 21	17; 21
2	(Russia) (Republic of Ireland)	Vladimir Malkov; Joshua Magee	21; 10	21; 17
3	(Russia) (Republic of Ireland)	Ekaterina Bolotova / Alina Davletova; Sara Boyle / Rachael Darragh	21; 11	21; 16
4	(Russia) (Republic of Ireland)	Vladimir Ivanov / Ivan Sozonov; Joshua Magee / Paul Reynolds	21; 8	21; 12
5	(Russia) (Republic of Ireland)	Rodion Alimov / Alina Davletova; Sam Magee / Chloe Magee	21; 13	21; 18
