= 2019 European Mixed Team Badminton Championships squads =

This article lists the confirmed squads lists for badminton's 2019 European Mixed Team Badminton Championships.

== Group 1 ==
=== Denmark ===
| Name | DoB/Age | MS Rank | WS Rank | MD Rank | WD Rank | XD Rank |
|---|---|---|---|---|---|---|
| Alexandra Bøje | 12 June 1999 (aged 19) | – | – | – | 73 | 44 |
| Anders Antonsen | 27 April 1997 (aged 21) | 20 | – | – | – | – |
| Anders Skaarup Rasmussen | 15 February 1989 (aged 29) | – | – | 6 | – | – |
| Christinna Pedersen | 12 May 1986 (aged 32) | – | – | – | 24 | 8 |
| David Daugaard | 27 December 1994 (aged 24) | – | – | 53 | – | – |
| Frederik Søgaard | 25 July 1997 (aged 21) | – | – | 53 | – | – |
| Julie Dawall Jakobsen | 25 March 1998 (aged 20) | – | 60 | – | 287 | – |
| Kim Astrup | 6 March 1992 (aged 26) | – | – | 6 | – | – |
| Line Kjærsfeldt | 20 April 1994 (aged 24) | – | 21 | – | – | – |
| Mads Pieler Kolding | 27 January 1988 (aged 31) | – | – | 15 | – | – |
| Maiken Fruergaard | 11 May 1995 (aged 23) | – | – | – | 15 | – |
| Mathias Christiansen | 20 February 1994 (aged 24) | – | – | 60 | – | 8 |
| Mia Blichfeldt | 19 August 1997 (aged 21) | – | 19 | – | 1054 | – |
| Niclas Nøhr | 20 August 1991 (aged 27) | – | – | 47 | – | 21 |
| Rasmus Gemke | 11 January 1997 (aged 22) | 19 | – | – | – | – |
| Rikke Søby Hansen | 1 February 1995 (aged 24) | – | – | – | 63 | 92 |
| Sara Thygesen | 20 January 1991 (aged 28) | – | – | – | 15 | 21 |
| Viktor Axelsen | 4 January 1994 (aged 25) | 6 | – | – | – | – |

=== France ===
| Name | DoB/Age | MS Rank | WS Rank | MD Rank | WD Rank | XD Rank |
|---|---|---|---|---|---|---|
| Anne Tran | 27 April 1996 (aged 22) | – | – | – | 19 | 126 |
| Bastian Kersaudy | 6 September 1994 (aged 24) | – | – | 144 | – | 77 |
| Brice Leverdez | 9 April 1986 (aged 32) | 27 | – | – | – | – |
| Delphine Delrue | 6 November 1998 (aged 20) | – | – | – | 22 | 49 |
| Émilie Lefel | 25 August 1988 (aged 30) | – | – | – | 19 | 281 |
| Gaëtan Mittelheisser | 26 July 1993 (aged 25) | – | – | 289 | – | 150 |
| Julien Maio | 6 May 1994 (aged 24) | – | – | 156 | – | – |
| Léa Palermo | 7 July 1993 (aged 25) | – | – | – | 29 | 77 |
| Léonice Huet | 21 May 2000 (aged 18) | – | 329 | – | – | – |
| Lucas Corvée | 9 June 1993 (aged 25) | 46 | – | – | – | – |
| Marie Batomene | 10 March 1995 (aged 23) | – | 133 | – | – | – |
| Ronan Labar | 3 May 1989 (aged 29) | – | – | 55 | – | 22 |
| Thom Gicquel | 12 January 1999 (aged 20) | – | – | 55 | – | 49 |
| Toma Junior Popov | 29 September 1998 (aged 20) | 57 | – | 126 | – | – |
| Yaëlle Hoyaux | 1 February 1998 (aged 21) | – | 147 | – | – | – |

=== Netherlands ===
| Name | DoB/Age | MS Rank | WS Rank | MD Rank | WD Rank | XD Rank |
|---|---|---|---|---|---|---|
| Alyssa Tirtosentono | 29 May 2000 (aged 18) | – | – | – | 321 | 1294 |
| Cheryl Seinen | 4 August 1995 (aged 23) | – | – | – | 20 | 39 |
| Debora Jille | 11 September 1999 (aged 19) | – | 255 | – | 60 | – |
| Gayle Mahulette | 17 April 1993 (aged 25) | – | 92 | – | – | – |
| Imke van der Aar | 16 February 1998 (aged 20) | – | – | – | 60 | 86 |
| Jacco Arends | 28 January 1998 (aged 21) | – | – | 42 | – | 29 |
| Jelle Maas | 19 February 1991 (aged 27) | – | – | 32 | – | 194 |
| Joran Kweekel | 16 May 1998 (aged 20) | 154 | – | – | – | – |
| Madouc Linders | 4 March 2000 (aged 18) | – | 1079 | – | – | 1063 |
| Mark Caljouw | 25 January 1995 (aged 24) | 36 | – | – | – | – |
| Nick Fransman | 28 February 1992 (aged 26) | 129 | – | – | – | – |
| Robin Tabeling | 24 April 1994 (aged 24) | – | – | 32 | – | 39 |
| Ruben Jille | 11 July 1996 (aged 22) | – | – | 42 | – | 86 |
| Selena Piek | 30 September 1991 (aged 27) | – | – | – | 20 | 29 |
| Soraya de Visch Eijbergen | 6 January 1993 (aged 26) | – | 71 | – | – | – |
| Ties van der Lecq | 10 March 2000 (aged 18) | – | – | 309 | – | – |

=== Spain ===
| Name | DoB/Age | MS Rank | WS Rank | MD Rank | WD Rank | XD Rank |
|---|---|---|---|---|---|---|
| Alberto Zapico | 30 January 1993 (aged 26) | – | – | 785 | – | 122 |
| Alejandro Alcala | 24 September 1999 (aged 19) | 411 | – | – | – | – |
| Álvaro Vázquez | 11 March 1999 (aged 19) | 265 | – | – | – | – |
| Beatriz Corrales | 3 December 1992 (aged 26) | – | 35 | – | 1037 | 1548 |
| Carolina Marín | 15 June 1993 (aged 25) | – | 4 | – | 1047 | – |
| Clara Azurmendi | 4 May 1998 (aged 20) | – | 116 | – | 1054 | – |
| Lorena Usle | 16 February 1994 (aged 24) | – | – | – | 230 | 122 |
| Luís Enrique Peñalver | 10 February 1996 (aged 23) | 80 | – | 1443 | – | – |
| Manuel Vázquez | 28 November 1995 (aged 23) | 273 | – | 785 | – | – |
| Manuela Díaz | | – | 442 | – | 690 | 806 |
| Nerea Ivorra Masia | 8 November 1997 (aged 21) | – | 1147 | – | 690 | 1298 |
| Pablo Abián | 12 June 1985 (aged 33) | 64 | – | 1484 | – | 1455 |
| Paula López | 7 October 1999 (aged 19) | – | – | – | 502 | 582 |
| Sara Peñalver | 26 August 1999 (aged 19) | – | 90 | – | 1037 | – |

== Group 2 ==
=== England ===
| Name | DoB/Age | MS Rank | WS Rank | MD Rank | WD Rank | XD Rank |
|---|---|---|---|---|---|---|
| Abigail Holden | 29 August 1999 (aged 19) | – | 173 | – | 178 | 1292 |
| Ben Lane | 13 July 1997 (aged 21) | – | – | 46 | – | 38 |
| Chloe Birch | 16 September 1995 (aged 23) | – | 44 | – | 41 | |
| Chris Adcock | 27 April 1989 (aged 29) | – | – | – | – | 7 |
| Chris Langridge | 2 May 1985 (aged 33) | – | – | 18 | – | – |
| Gabby Adcock | 30 September 1990 (aged 28) | – | – | – | – | 7 |
| Jenny Moore | 31 August 1995 (aged 23) | – | – | – | 77 | 56 |
| Jessica Pugh | 17 March 1997 (aged 21) | – | – | – | 84 | 38 |
| Lauren Smith | 26 September 1991 (aged 27) | – | – | – | 41 | 13 |
| Marcus Ellis | 14 September 1989 (aged 29) | – | – | 18 | – | 13 |
| Rajiv Ouseph | 30 August 1986 (aged 32) | 34 | – | – | – | – |
| Sean Vendy | 18 May 1996 (aged 22) | – | – | 46 | – | – |
| Toby Penty | 12 August 1992 (aged 26) | 62 | – | – | – | – |

=== Russia ===
| Name | DoB/Age | MS Rank | WS Rank | MD Rank | WD Rank | XD Rank |
|---|---|---|---|---|---|---|
| Alina Davletova | 18 July 1998 (aged 20) | – | – | – | 23 | 40 |
| Anastasiia Semenova | 12 March 1999 (aged 19) | – | 149 | – | 253 | 142 |
| Ekaterina Bolotova | 12 December 1992 (aged 26) | – | – | – | 23 | 78 |
| Evgenia Dimova | 29 April 1982 (aged 36) | – | – | – | – | 26 |
| Evgenij Dremin | 24 February 1981 (aged 37) | – | – | 103 | – | 26 |
| Evgeniya Kosetskaya | 16 November 1994 (aged 24) | – | 32 | – | 994 | – |
| Ivan Sozonov | 6 July 1989 (aged 29) | – | – | 22 | – | – |
| Nina Vislova | 4 October 1986 (aged 32) | – | – | – | 690 | 191 |
| Rodion Alimov | 21 April 1998 (aged 20) | – | – | 139 | – | 40 |
| Sergey Sirant | 12 April 1994 (aged 24) | 74 | – | – | – | – |
| Vladimir Ivanov | 3 July 1987 (aged 31) | 1674 | – | 22 | – | 197 |
| Vladimir Malkov | 9 April 1986 (aged 32) | 59 | – | – | – | – |

=== Ireland ===
| Name | DoB/Age | MS Rank | WS Rank | MD Rank | WD Rank | XD Rank |
|---|---|---|---|---|---|---|
| Chloe Magee | 29 October 1987 (aged 31) | – | 411 | – | 1012 | 42 |
| Joshua Magee | 3 November 1994 (aged 24) | 147 | – | 81 | – | 1122 |
| Nhat Nguyen | 16 June 2000 (aged 18) | 106 | – | 358 | – | – |
| Paul Reynolds | 8 March 1999 (aged 19) | – | – | 81 | – | 146 |
| Rachael Darragh | 24 September 1997 (aged 21) | – | 197 | – | 155 | 146 |
| Sam Magee | 9 January 1990 (aged 29) | – | – | 358 | – | 42 |
| Sara Boyle | 31 August 1997 (aged 21) | – | 254 | – | 155 | 806 |

=== Germany ===
| Name | DoB/Age | MS Rank | WS Rank | MD Rank | WD Rank | XD Rank |
|---|---|---|---|---|---|---|
| Alexanders Roovers | 17 March 1987 (aged 31) | 85 | – | – | – | – |
| Bjarne Geiss | 29 November 1997 (aged 21) | – | – | 86 | – | 759 |
| Eva Janssens | 16 July 1996 (aged 22) | – | – | – | 133 | 63 |
| Fabienne Deprez | 8 February 1992 (aged 27) | – | 80 | – | – | – |
| Isabel Herttrich | 17 March 1992 (aged 26) | – | – | – | 45 | 18 |
| Jan Colin Völker | 26 February 1998 (aged 20) | – | – | 86 | – | 708 |
| Johanna Goliszewski | 9 May 1986 (aged 32) | – | – | – | 37 | 153 |
| Jones Ralfy Jansen | 12 November 1992 (aged 26) | – | – | 37 | – | 87 |
| Kai Schäfer | 13 June 1993 (aged 25) | 105 | – | – | – | – |
| Kilasu Ostermeyer | 5 March 1997 (aged 21) | – | – | – | 231 | 647 |
| Lara Käpplein | 25 May 1995 (aged 23) | – | – | – | 37 | 252 |
| Lars Schänzler | 24 August 1995 (aged 23) | 137 | – | – | – | – |
| Linda Efler | 23 January 1995 (aged 24) | – | – | – | 49 | 22 |
| Luise Heim | 24 March 1996 (aged 22) | – | 83 | – | – | – |
| Mark Lamsfuß | 19 April 1994 (aged 24) | – | – | 29 | – | 18 |
| Marvin Emil Seidel | 9 November 1995 (aged 23) | – | – | 29 | – | 22 |
| Max Weißkirchen | 18 October 1996 (aged 22) | 228 | – | 1471 | – | – |
| Miranda Wilson | 6 April 2000 (aged 18) | – | 319 | – | 1330 | – |
| Peter Käsbauer | 17 March 1988 (aged 30) | – | – | 153 | – | 51 |
| Yvonne Li | 30 May 1998 (aged 20) | – | 45 | – | – | – |
