= 2013 Dutch Open Grand Prix =

Tournament details
- Dates: October 8, 2013 - October 13, 2013
- Total prize money: US$50,000
- Venue: Topsportcentrum
- Location: Almere, Netherlands

The 2013 Dutch Open Grand Prix was the thirtieth grand prix gold and grand prix tournament of the 2013 BWF Grand Prix Gold and Grand Prix. The tournament was held in Topsportcentrum, Almere, Netherlands October 8 until October 13, 2013 and had a total purse of $50,000.

== Men's singles ==
=== Seeds ===
1. (Netherlands) Eric Pang (first round)
2. (Malaysia) Tan Chun Seang (third round)
3. (Malaysia) Mohd Arif Abdul Latif (withdrew)
4. (Finland) Ville Lang (withdrew)
5. (Sweden) Henri Hurskainen (third round)
6. (Singapore) Derek Wong Zi Liang (quarter-final)
7. (Ukraine) Dmytro Zavadsky (semi-final)
8. (Hong Kong) Chan Yan Kit (final)
9. (Czech Republic) Petr Koukal (withdrew)
10. (Malaysia) Zulfadli Zulkiffli (second round)
11. (Indonesia) Wisnu Yuli Prasetyo (third round)
12. (Indonesia) Riyanto Subagja (third round)
13. (France) Matthieu Lo Ying Ping (withdrew)
14. (Belgium) Yuhan Tan (second round)
15. (India) Arvind Bhat (quarter-final)
16. (Scotland) Kieran Merrilees (quarter-final)

=== Finals ===
Quarterfinals
15	(India) Arvind Bhat	8	12
(Hong Kong) Wei Nan	21	21
(China) Xue Song	21	22
6	(Singapore) Derek Wong Zi Liang	12	20
8	(Hong Kong) Chan Yan Kit	21	21
(China) Huang Yuxiang	13	8
7	(Ukraine) Dmytro Zavadsky	22	21
16	(Scotland) Kieran Merrilees	20	15

Semifinals
(Hong Kong) Wei Nan	21	18	21
(China) Xue Song	16	21	13
8	(Hong Kong) Chan Yan Kit	21	13	21
7	(Ukraine) Dmytro Zavadsky	14	21	15

Final
(Hong Kong) Wei Nan	21	21
8	(Hong Kong) Chan Yan Kit	15	18

=== Top half ===
==== Section 1 ====
First Round
1	(Netherlands) E Pang	21	14	10
(Sweden) G Ulldahl	14	21	21
(Netherlands) V de Vries	21	21
(Greece) G Charalambidis	8	9
15	(India) A Bhat
BYE
(England) M Spencer-Smith	13	8
(Chinese Taipei) Hsu J-t	21	21

Second Round
(Sweden) G Ulldahl	21	21
(Netherlands) V de Vries	19	7
15	(India) A Bhat	22	21	21
(Chinese Taipei) Hsu J-t	24	13	19

Third Round
(Sweden) G Ulldahl	14	18
15	(India) A Bhat	21	21

==== Section 2 ====
First Round
5	(Sweden) H Hurskainen	21	13	21
(France) A Genin	10	21	8
PFQ	(Greece) D Orlis	12	12
(Ukraine) V Atrashchenkov	21	21
PFQ	(Netherlands) A Vlaar	14	21	13
(Indonesia) K Alexander	21	19	21
(Bulgaria) S Makarski	15	18
(Hong Kong) Wei N	21	21

Second Round
5	(Sweden) H Hurskainen	21	21
(Ukraine) V Atrashchenkov	18	11
(Indonesia) K Alexander	14	10
(Hong Kong) Wei N	21	21

Third Round
5	(Sweden) H Hurskainen	18	17
(Hong Kong) Wei N	21	21

==== Section 3 ====
First Round
PFQ	(Russia) M Muzhevlev	4	8
(Netherlands) J Hilbink	21	21
BYE
(Ukraine) K Leonov
14	(Belgium) Y Tan	21	21
PFQ	(Netherlands) J Teeuwen	10	19
(China) Xue S	21	21
(Indonesia) M Firdaus	11	11

Second Round
(Netherlands) J Hilbink	21	21
(Ukraine) K Leonov	11	19
14	(Belgium) Y Tan	7	17
(China) Xue S	21	21

Third Round
(Netherlands) J Hilbink	13	10
(China) Xue S	21	21

==== Section 4 ====
First Round
6	(Singapore) D Wong	21	21
(Switzerland) K Schaffluetzel	13	9
(Germany) T Wadenka	21	11	14
(Malaysia) Chiang JS	10	21	21
11	(Indonesia) W Prasetyo	21	21
(Sweden) M Wigardt	15	17
(Slovakia) J Vicen	21	21	21
(Indonesia) Siswanto	23	17	18

Second Round
6	(Singapore) D Wong	21	21
(Malaysia) Chiang JS	15	17
11	(Indonesia) W Prasetyo	21	21
(Slovakia) J Vicen	11	6

Third Round
6	(Singapore) D Wong	17	21	21
11	(Indonesia) W Prasetyo	21	16	19

=== Bottom half ===
==== Section 5 ====
First Round
(Sweden) M Borg	21	21
(Malaysia) Loke KP	12	16
(Netherlands) N Fransman	21	7	8
10	(Malaysia) Z Zulkiffli	16	21	21
PFQ	(Zambia) E Mambwe	14	10
PFQ	(Indonesia) J Arbitama	21	21
(China) Tian HW	13	20
8	(Hong Kong) Chan YK	21	22

Second Round
(Sweden) M Borg	21	15	21
10	(Malaysia) Z Zulkiffli	19	21	16
PFQ	(Indonesia) J Arbitama	5	5
8	(Hong Kong) Chan YK	21	21

Third Round
(Sweden) M Borg	13	13
8	(Hong Kong) Chan YK	21	21

==== Section 6 ====
First Round
(Germany) J Persson	21	7	12
(Chinese Taipei) Shih K-c	14	21	21
(Bulgaria) B Kisyov	23	10	5
12	(Indonesia) R Subagja	21	21	21
(Netherlands) E Meijs	21	21
PFQ	(Slovakia) M Polacek	5	4
(China) Huang YX	21	21
PFQ	(Suriname) V Soeroredjo	9	7

Second Round
(Chinese Taipei) Shih K-c	18	21	19
12	(Indonesia) R Subagja	21	10	21
(Netherlands) E Meijs	14	21	16
(China) Huang YX	21	16	21

Third Round
12	(Indonesia) R Subagja	14	16
(China) Huang YX	21	21

==== Section 7 ====
First Round
PFQ	(Germany) D Benz	14	17
(Belgium) M Moreels	21	21
(Indonesia) A Marteen
13	(France) M Lo Ying Ping	wo
(Malaysia) Woon KH	21	21
(Netherlands) M de Jager	9	12
(Malaysia) Chan KB	9	11
7	(Ukraine) D Zavadsky	21	21

Second Round
(Belgium) M Moreels	14	15
(Indonesia) A Marteen	21	21
(Malaysia) Woon KH	20	18
7	(Ukraine) D Zavadsky	22	21

Third Round
(Indonesia) A Marteen	21	12	9
7	(Ukraine) D Zavadsky	19	21	21

==== Section 8 ====
First Round
PFQ	(Switzerland) S Kradolfer	14	18
(New Zealand) J Wu	21	21
(Netherlands) M Caljouw	21	11	10
16	(Scotland) K Merrilees	18	21	21
(Germany) A Trisnanto	21	17	21
(Netherlands) J Natenstedt	15	21	13
(Ukraine) A Pochtarev	10	21	12
2	(Malaysia) Tan CS	21	13	21

Second Round
(New Zealand) J Wu	8	23	11
16	(Scotland) K Merrilees	21	21	21
(Germany) A Trisnanto	21	12	14
2	(Malaysia) Tan CS	14	21	21

Third Round
16	(Scotland) K Merrilees	21	21
2	(Malaysia) Tan CS	18	18

== Women's singles ==
=== Seeds ===
1. (Thailand) Porntip Buranaprasertsuk (quarter-final)
2. (Thailand) Busanan Ongbumrungpan (champion)
3. (Singapore) Gu Juan (final)
4. (Bulgaria) Petya Nedelcheva (first round)
5. (China) Deng Xuan (second round)
6. (France) Sashina Vignes Waran (first round)
7. (Czech Republic) Kristina Gavnholt (quarter-final)
8. (Germany) Karin Schnaase (quarter-final)

=== Finals ===
Semifinals
(Indonesia) Hera Desi	10	21
3	(Singapore) Gu Juan	21	23
Q4	(China) Hui Xirui	12	12
2	(Thailand) Busanan Ongbumrungpan	21	21

Final
3	(Singapore) Gu Juan	12	12
2	(Thailand) Busanan Ongbumrungpan	21	21

=== Top half ===
==== Section 1 ====
First Round
1	(Thailand) P Buranaprasertsuk
(New Zealand) M Chan Ky	wo
(Russia) K Polikarpova	7	9
Q1	(Japan) S Sato	21	21
6	(France) S Vignes Waran	15	21	16
(Indonesia) H Desi	21	16	21
(England) F Chapman	10	9
(Thailand) S Ponsana	21	21

Second Round
1	(Thailand) P Buranaprasertsuk	14	21	21
Q1	(Japan) S Sato	21	13	17
(Indonesia) H Desi	21	21
(Thailand) S Ponsana	16	19

Quarterfinals
1	(Thailand) P Buranaprasertsuk	19	21	14
(Indonesia) H Desi	21	19	21

==== Section 2 ====
First Round
3	(Singapore) Gu J	21	21
(Lithuania) A Stapusaityte	8	9
(Chinese Taipei) Chang Y-l	12	21	18
Q3	(England) P Riou	21	17	21
8	(Germany) K Schnaase	21	21
(Austria) S Prutsch	6	10
(Bulgaria) S Stoeva	21	21
Q2	(Australia) T Pilven	8	9

Second Round
3	(Singapore) Gu J	21	21
(England) P Riou	13	14
8	(Germany) K Schnaase	21	20	21
(Bulgaria) S Stoeva	19	22	16

Quarterfinals
3	(Singapore) Gu J	22	21
8	(Germany) K Schnaase	20	10

=== Bottom half ===
==== Section 3 ====
First Round
(Singapore) Chen JY	21	12	10
(Indonesia) M Kusumastuti	16	21	21
(England) S Walker	10	4
5	(China) Deng X	21	21
Q4	(China) Hui XR	0
PFQ	(England) N Cerfontyne	1^{r}
(Russia) N Perminova	13	21	21
4	(Bulgaria) P Nedelcheva	21	12	8

Second Round
(Indonesia) M Kusumastuti	11	21	22
5	(China) Deng X	21	19	20
Q4	(China) Hui XR	21	22	21
(Russia) N Perminova	12	24	14

Quarterfinals
(Indonesia) M Kusumastuti	21	15	16
Q4	(China) Hui XR	13	21	21

==== Section 4 ====
First Round
(Belgium) L Tan	18	21	29
(Switzerland) N Schaller	21	19	27
(India) T Lad	13	14
7	(Czech Republic) K Gavnholt	21	21
(Republic of Ireland) C Magee	18	21	24
(Ukraine) M Ulitina	21	13	22
(Indonesia) M Wiranto	13	13
2	(Thailand) B Ongbumrungpan	21	21

Second Round
(Belgium) L Tan	15	21	14
7	(Czech Republic) K Gavnholt	21	14	21
(Republic of Ireland) C Magee	13	12
2	(Thailand) B Ongbumrungpan	21	21

Quarterfinals
7	(Czech Republic) K Gavnholt	15	19
2	(Thailand) B Ongbumrungpan	21	21

== Men's doubles ==
=== Seeds ===
1. (Malaysia) Mohd Zakry Abdul Latif / Mohd Fairuzizuan Mohd Tazari (withdrew)
2. (Netherlands) Ruud Bosch / Koen Ridder (quarter-final)
3. (India) Pranav Chopra / Akshay Dewalkar (second round)
4. (Indonesia) Wahyu Nayaka / Ade Yusuf (champion)

=== Finals ===
Semifinals
(China) Kang Jun (China) Liu Cheng	12	15
(Indonesia) Berry Angriawan (Indonesia) Ricky Karanda Suwardi	21	21
4	(Indonesia) Wahyu Nayaka (Indonesia) Ade Yusuf	15	21	21
(China) Li Gen (China) Zhang Nan	21	14	16

Final
(Indonesia) Berry Angriawan (Indonesia) Ricky Karanda Suwardi	21	18	17
4	(Indonesia) Wahyu Nayaka (Indonesia) Ade Yusuf	14	21	21

=== Top half ===
==== Section 1 ====
First Round
1	(Malaysia) Z Abdul Latif (Malaysia) F Tazari
BYE
(Belgium) M Dierickx (Belgium) F Golinski	wo
(China) Kang J (China) Liu C
(England) C Coles (England) M Nottingham	21	21
(Germany) D Benz (Malaysia) Chan KB	19	11
(Netherlands) M Caljouw (Netherlands) J Teeuwen	21	16	21
(New Zealand) J Wu (Chinese Taipei) Shin K-c	15	21	16

Second Round
1	(Malaysia) Z Abdul Latif (Malaysia) F Tazari	wo
(China) Kang J (China) Liu C
(England) C Coles (England) M Nottingham	21	21
(Netherlands) M Caljouw (Netherlands) J Teeuwen	12	10

Quarterfinals
(China) Kang J (China) Liu C	21	21
(England) C Coles (England) M Nottingham	14	19

==== Section 2 ====
First Round
3	(India) P Chopra (India) A Dewalkar
BYE
(Indonesia) B Angriawan (Indonesia) R Suwardi	21	21
(Netherlands) N Hermans (Netherlands) R Wijnands	9	15
(Netherlands) J de Ruiter (Netherlands) R Tabeling	wo
(Indonesia) C Rusdianto (Indonesia) T Wardhana
(Netherlands) J Arends (Netherlands) J Maas	21	15	21
(China) Chen ZF (China) Lu K	19	21	17

Second Round
3	(India) P Chopra (India) A Dewalkar	20	18
(Indonesia) B Angriawan (Indonesia) R Suwardi	22	21
(Indonesia) C Rusdianto (Indonesia) T Wardhana	22	23
(Netherlands) J Arends (Netherlands) J Maas	20	21

Quarterfinals
(Indonesia) B Angriawan (Indonesia) R Suwardi	21	21
(Indonesia) C Rusdianto (Indonesia) T Wardhana	10	12

=== Bottom half ===
==== Section 3 ====
First Round
(France) L Constantin (France) M Lo Ying Ping	wo
(Chinese Taipei) Huang P-j (Chinese Taipei) Lu C-y
(Germany) F Holzer (Germany) M Lamsfuss	18	21	21
(Netherlands) R Jille (Netherlands) A Vlaar	21	5	12
(England) M Ellis (England) T Wolfenden	19	21	21
(Indonesia) A Saputra (Indonesia) Siswanto	21	19	14
BYE
4	(Indonesia) W Nayaka (Indonesia) A Yusuf

Second Round
(Chinese Taipei) Huang P-j (Chinese Taipei) Lu C-y
(Germany) F Holzer (Germany) M Lamsfuss	wo
(England) M Ellis (England) T Wolfenden	21	19	20
4	(Indonesia) W Nayaka (Indonesia) A Yusuf	19	21	22

Quarterfinals
(Chinese Taipei) Huang P-j (Chinese Taipei) Lu C-y	17	18
4	(Indonesia) W Nayaka (Indonesia) A Yusuf	21	21

==== Section 4 ====
First Round
(China) Li G (China) Zhang N
(Malaysia) R Abdul Latif (Malaysia) H Hashim	wo
(Indonesia) M Firdaus (Germany) J Persson	15	13
(Sweden) F Myhren (Sweden) N Ruponen	21	21
(England) P Briggs (England) H Towler	21	21
(Ukraine) V Atrashchenkov (Ukraine) A Pochtarev	16	20
BYE
2	(Netherlands) R Bosch (Netherlands) K Ridder

Second Round
(China) Li G (China) Zhang N	12	21	21
(Sweden) F Myhren (Sweden) N Ruponen	21	17	15
(England) P Briggs (England) H Towler	22	19	18
2	(Netherlands) R Bosch (Netherlands) K Ridder	20	21	21

Quarterfinals
(China) Li G (China) Zhang N	21	21
2	(Netherlands) R Bosch (Netherlands) K Ridder	18	19

== Women's doubles ==
=== Seeds ===
1. (Singapore) Shinta Mulia Sari / Yao Lei (second round)
2. (Bulgaria) Gabriela Stoeva / Stefani Stoeva (second round)
3. (Russia) Irina Khlebko / Ksenia Polikarpova (quarter-final)
4. (Scotland) Imogen Bankier / (Bulgaria) Petya Nedelcheva (quarter-final)

=== Finals ===
Semifinals
(Indonesia) Anggia Shitta Awanda (Indonesia) Della Destiara Haris	21	21
(China) Du Peng (China) Xiong Mengjing	12	19
(China) Bao Yixin (China) Tang Jinhua	21	21
(Netherlands) Eefje Muskens (Netherlands) Selena Piek	17	12

Final
(Indonesia) Anggia Shitta Awanda (Indonesia) Della Destiara Haris	15	7
(China) Bao Yixin (China) Tang Jinhua	21	21

=== Top half ===
==== Section 1 ====
First Round
1	(Singapore) S Sari (Singapore) Yao L
BYE
(Belgium) J Elst (Belgium) J Snoeck	11	12
(Indonesia) A Awanda (Indonesia) D Haris	21	21
(Sweden) A Hogstrom (Sweden) L Eriksson
BYE
(Netherlands) S Barning (Netherlands) I Tabeling	wo
(Germany) K Kattenbeck (Germany) F Volkmann

Second Round
1	(Singapore) S Sari (Singapore) Yao L	16	18
(Indonesia) A Awanda (Indonesia) D Haris	21	21
(Sweden) A Hogstrom (Sweden) L Eriksson	10	11
(Germany) K Kattenbeck (Germany) F Volkmann	21	21

Quarterfinals
(Indonesia) A Awanda (Indonesia) D Haris	21	21
(Germany) K Kattenbeck (Germany) F Volkmann	4	6

==== Section 2 ====
First Round
3	(Russia) I Khlebko (Russia) K Polikarpova
BYE
(Greece) I Karkantzia (Latvia) I Pope	16	8
(Netherlands) L Malaihollo (Lithuania) A Stapusaityte	21	21
(Japan) C Hoshi (Japan) N Shinoya	16	14
(China) Du P (China) Xiong MJ	21	21
(Thailand) L Narissapat (Thailand) S Amitrapai	21	21
(England) S Brown (England) A Lim	18	14

Second Round
3	(Russia) I Khlebko (Russia) K Polikarpova	21	18	21
(Netherlands) L Malaihollo (Lithuania) A Stapusaityte	13	21	12
(China) Du P (China) Xiong MJ	21	13	21
(Thailand) L Narissapat (Thailand) S Amitrapai	9	21	19

Quarterfinals
3	(Russia) I Khlebko (Russia) K Polikarpova	8	13
(China) Du P (China) Xiong MJ	21	21

=== Bottom half ===
==== Section 3 ====
First Round
(Nigeria) G Gabriel (Nigeria) M van Daal	14	17
(Ukraine) A Dmytryshyn (Ukraine) D Samarchants	21	21
(China) Bao YX (China) Tang JH	21	21
(Netherlands) S Eijbergen (Netherlands) A Chen	9	13
(Thailand) P Buranaprasertsuk (Thailand) B Ongbumrungpan	9
(Indonesia) S Andini (Indonesia) J Gozali	7^{r}
BYE
4	(Scotland) I Bankier (Bulgaria) P Nedelcheva

Second Round
(Ukraine) A Dmytryshyn (Ukraine) D Samarchants	4	6
(China) Bao YX (China) Tang JH	21	21
(Thailand) P Buranaprasertsuk (Thailand) B Ongbumrungpan	21	15	19
4	(Scotland) I Bankier (Bulgaria) P Nedelcheva	17	21	21

Quarterfinals
(China) Bao YX (China) Tang JH	21	21
4	(Scotland) I Bankier (Bulgaria) P Nedelcheva	15	12

==== Section 4 ====
First Round
(Singapore) Fu MT (Singapore) V Neo	21	21
(Belgium) S Annys (Belgium) S Corvilain	11	12
(Germany) H Pohl (Germany) L Kaminski	19	13
(Netherlands) C Seinen (Netherlands) D Lups	21	21
(China) Huang YQ (China) Zhu MC	11	11
(Netherlands) E Muskens (Netherlands) S Piek	21	21
BYE
2	(Bulgaria) G Stoeva (Bulgaria) S Stoeva

Second Round
(Singapore) Fu MT (Singapore) V Neo	21	21
(Netherlands) C Seinen (Netherlands) D Lups	9	18
(Netherlands) E Muskens (Netherlands) S Piek	21	21
2	(Bulgaria) G Stoeva (Bulgaria) S Stoeva	11	15

Quarterfinals
(Singapore) Fu MT (Singapore) V Neo	11	12
(Netherlands) E Muskens (Netherlands) S Piek	21	21

== Mixed doubles ==
=== Seeds ===
1. (Indonesia) Muhammad Rijal / Debby Susanto (final)
2. (Singapore) Danny Bawa Chrisnanta / Vanessa Neo Yu Yan (champion)
3. (Netherlands) Jorrit de Ruiter / Samantha Barning (withdrew)
4. (Indonesia) Irfan Fadhilah / Weni Anggraini (quarter-final)
5. (Scotland) Robert Blair / Imogen Bankier (withdrew)
6. (Indonesia) Lukhi Apri Nugroho / Annisa Saufika (second round)
7. (Indonesia) Edi Subaktiar / Gloria Emanuelle Widjaja (withdrew)
8. (Sweden) Nico Ruponen / Amanda Hogstrom (quarter-final)

=== Finals ===
Semifinals
1	(Indonesia) Muhammad Rijal (Indonesia) Debby Susanto	21	21
(Ukraine) Dmytro Zavadsky (Ukraine) Anastasiya Dmytryshyn	13	11
(China) Lu Kai (China) Tang Jinhua	21	18	19
2	(Singapore) Danny Bawa Chrisnanta (Singapore) Vanessa Neo Yu Yan	16	21	21

Final
1	(Indonesia) Muhammad Rijal (Indonesia) Debby Susanto	19	23
2	(Singapore) Danny Bawa Chrisnanta (Singapore) Vanessa Neo Yu Yan	21	25

=== Top half ===
==== Section 1 ====
First Round
1	(Indonesia) M Rijal (Indonesia) D Susanto	21	21
(France) L Constantin (France) L Choinet	9	9
(England) C Coles (England) A Lim	21	21
(New Zealand) J Wu (Chinese Taipei) Chang Y-l	10	4
7	(Indonesia) E Subaktiar (Indonesia) G Widjaja	wo
(China) Liu C (China) Bao YX
(China) Kang J (China) Huang YQ	21	21
(Austria) R Zirnwald (Austria) E Baldauf	11	14

Second Round
1	(Indonesia) M Rijal (Indonesia) D Susanto	21	21
(England) C Coles (England) A Lim	13	11
(China) Liu C (China) Bao YX	12	13
(China) Kang J (China) Huang YQ	21	21

Quarterfinals
1	(Indonesia) M Rijal (Indonesia) D Susanto	21	21
(China) Kang J (China) Huang YQ	7	19

==== Section 2 ====
First Round
PFQ	(Suriname) V Soeroredjo (Netherlands) L Malaihollo	16	16
(Belgium) F Golinski (Belgium) S Corvilain	21	21
PFQ	(England) P Briggs (England) S Brown
PFQ	(Indonesia) T Wardhana (India) K Das	wo
PFQ	(Netherlands) R Wijnands (Netherlands) D Lups	9	21	13
(Netherlands) R Jille (Netherlands) A Chen	21	18	21
(Ukraine) D Zavadsky (Ukraine) A Dmytryshyn	21	21
(Germany) T Wadenka (Germany) K Kattenbeck	21	19

Second Round
(Belgium) F Golinski (Belgium) S Corvilain	16	21	21
PFQ	(England) P Briggs (England) S Brown	21	16	19
(Netherlands) R Jille (Netherlands) A Chen	14	12
(Ukraine) D Zavadsky (Ukraine) A Dmytryshyn	21	21

Quarterfinals
(Belgium) F Golinski (Belgium) S Corvilain	16	17
(Ukraine) D Zavadsky (Ukraine) A Dmytryshyn	21	21

=== Bottom half ===
==== Section 3 ====
First Round
(Greece) D Orlis (Greece) I Karkantzia	5	5
(China) Lu K (China) Tang JH	21	21
(Bulgaria) S Makarski (Switzerland) C Tripet	15	15
6	(Indonesia) L Nugroho (Indonesia) A Saufika	21	21
(Germany) A Trisnanto (Indonesia) M Jolly	18	23	13
(Netherlands) J Maas (Netherlands) I Tabeling	21	21	21
(India) P Chopra (India) M Kukkapalli	16	14
4	(Indonesia) I Fadhilah (Indonesia) W Anggraini	21	21

Second Round
(China) Lu K (China) Tang JH	21	21
6	(Indonesia) L Nugroho (Indonesia) A Saufika	13	15
(Netherlands) J Maas (Netherlands) I Tabeling	12	21	16
4	(Indonesia) I Fadhilah (Indonesia) W Anggraini	21	17	21

Quarterfinals
(China) Lu K (China) Tang JH	21	21
4	(Indonesia) I Fadhilah (Indonesia) W Anggraini	12	11

==== Section 4 ====
First Round
(China) Chen ZF (China) Du P	21	21
PFQ	(Germany) M Lamsfuss (Germany) F Volkmann	13	8
BYE
8	(Sweden) N Ruponen (Sweden) A Hogstrom
PFQ	(Netherlands) N Hermans (Netherlands) C Seinen	16	20
(Ukraine) K Leonov (Ukraine) M Ulitina	21	22
(Netherlands) J Arends (Netherlands) S Piek	10	19
2	(Singapore) D Chrisnanta (Singapore) V Neo	21	21

Second Round
(China) Chen ZF (China) Du P	12	20
8	(Sweden) N Ruponen (Sweden) A Hogstrom	21	22
(Ukraine) K Leonov (Ukraine) M Ulitina	8	8
2	(Singapore) D Chrisnanta (Singapore) V Neo	21	21

Quarterfinals
8	(Sweden) N Ruponen (Sweden) A Hogstrom	19	13
2	(Singapore) D Chrisnanta (Singapore) V Neo	21	21

Preceded by 2013 London Grand Prix Gold	BWF Grand Prix Gold and Grand Prix; 2013 season	Succeeded by 2013 Bitburger Open Grand Prix Gold
