= Badminton at the 2019 European Games – Women's doubles =

Badminton's women's doubles at the 2019 European Games
- Venue: Falcon Club
- Dates: 24–29 June
- Competitors: 32 from 16 nations

Medalists
gold medal	Selena Piek; Cheryl Seinen	Netherlands
silver medal	Chloe Birch; Lauren Smith	Great Britain
bronze medal	Émilie Lefel; Anne Tran	France
bronze medal	Ekaterina Bolotova; Alina Davletova	Russia

The badminton women's doubles tournament at the 2019 European Games was held from 24 to 29 June at Falcon Club.

== Competition format ==
The doubles tournament is played with 16 pairs, initially playing in four groups of four, before the top two from each group qualifies for an 8-pair knock-out stage.

=== Schedule ===
All times are in FET (UTC+03).

Start time	Session
24 June, 9:00	Group stage, matchday 1
25 June, 9:00	Group stage, matchday 2
26 June, 9:00	Group stage, matchday 3
27 June, 17:00	Quarter-finals
28 June, 18:00	Semi-finals
29 June, 18:00	Final

== Seeds ==
Seeds for all badminton events at the 2nd European Games were announced on 29 May.

1. Maiken Fruergaard / Sara Thygesen (DEN) (quarterfinals)
2. Ekaterina Bolotova / Alina Davletova (RUS) (bronze medal)
3. Émilie Lefel / Anne Tran (FRA) (bronze medal)
4. Selena Piek / Cheryl Seinen (NED) (gold medal)

== Results ==
The group stage draws was held on 4 June.

=== Group stage ===
==== Group A ====
Pos	Team	Pld	W	L	GF	GA	GD	PF	PA	PD	Qualification
1	Chloe Birch / Lauren Smith (GBR)	3	3	0	4	0	+4	126	72	+54	Qualification to knock-out stage
2	Maiken Fruergaard / Sara Thygesen (DEN) [1]	3	2	1	4	2	+2	114	79	+35	Qualification to knock-out stage
3	Nikoletta Bukoviczki / Daniella Gonda (HUN)	3	1	2	2	3	−1	94	137	−43	
4	Vytautė Fomkinaitė / Gerda Voitechovskaja (LTU)	3	0	3	1	6	−5	94	140	−46	

Source: TS

Date		Score		Set 1	Set 2	Set 3
24 June; 16:00	Maiken Fruergaard (Denmark); Sara Thygesen (Denmark)	0–2	(United Kingdom) Chloe Birch (United Kingdom) Lauren Smith	12–21	18–21	
24 June; 16:40	Nikoletta Bukoviczki (Hungary); Daniella Gonda (Hungary)	2–1	(Lithuania) Vytautė Fomkinaitė (Lithuania) Gerda Voitechovskaja	21–13	14–21	21–19
25 June; 10:20	Maiken Fruergaard (Denmark); Sara Thygesen (Denmark)	2–0	(Hungary) Nikoletta Bukoviczki (Hungary) Daniella Gonda	21–7	21–13	
25 June; 11:00	Chloe Birch (United Kingdom); Lauren Smith (United Kingdom)	2–0	(Lithuania) Vytautė Fomkinaitė (Lithuania) Gerda Voitechovskaja	21–9	21–15	
26 June; 11:00	Chloe Birch (United Kingdom); Lauren Smith (United Kingdom)	2–0	(Hungary) Nikoletta Bukoviczki (Hungary) Daniella Gonda	21–6	21–12	
26 June; 11:00	Maiken Fruergaard (Denmark); Sara Thygesen (Denmark)	2–0	(Lithuania) Vytautė Fomkinaitė (Lithuania) Gerda Voitechovskaja	21–10	21–7	

==== Group B ====
Pos	Team	Pld	W	L	GF	GA	GD	PF	PA	PD	Qualification
1	Ekaterina Bolotova / Alina Davletova (RUS) [2]	3	3	0	6	1	+5	143	101	+42	Qualification to knock-out stage
2	Emma Karlsson / Johanna Magnusson (SWE)	3	2	1	5	2	+3	138	105	+33	Qualification to knock-out stage
3	Maryna Ilyinskaya / Yelyzaveta Zharka (UKR)	3	1	2	2	4	−2	93	100	−7	
4	Silvia Garino / Lisa Iversen (ITA)	3	0	3	0	6	−6	58	126	−68	

Source: TS

Date		Score		Set 1	Set 2	Set 3
24 June; 12:20	Silvia Garino (Italy); Lisa Iversen (Italy)	0–2	(Ukraine) Maryna Ilyinskaya (Ukraine) Yelyzaveta Zharka	9–21	7–21	
24 June; 14:00	Ekaterina Bolotova (Russia); Alina Davletova (Russia)	2–1	(Sweden) Johanna Magnusson (Sweden) Emma Karlsson	21–15	17–21	21–18
25 June; 12:20	Johanna Magnusson (Sweden); Emma Karlsson (Sweden)	2–0	(Ukraine) Maryna Ilyinskaya (Ukraine) Yelyzaveta Zharka	21–12	21–13	
25 June; 13:40	Ekaterina Bolotova (Russia); Alina Davletova (Russia)	2–0	(Italy) Silvia Garino (Italy) Lisa Iversen	21–9	21–12	
26 June; 15:00	Ekaterina Bolotova (Russia); Alina Davletova (Russia)	2–0	(Ukraine) Maryna Ilyinskaya (Ukraine) Yelyzaveta Zharka	21–12	21–14	
26 June; 19:30	Johanna Magnusson (Sweden); Emma Karlsson (Sweden)	2–0	(Italy) Silvia Garino (Italy) Lisa Iversen	21–10	21–11	

==== Group C ====
Pos	Team	Pld	W	L	GF	GA	GD	PF	PA	PD	Qualification
1	Émilie Lefel / Anne Tran (FRA) [3]	3	3	0	6	0	+6	128	93	+35	Qualification to knock-out stage
2	Kati-Kreet Marran / Helina Rüütel (EST)	3	2	1	4	2	+2	124	101	+23	Qualification to knock-out stage
3	Lise Jaques / Flore Vandenhoucke (BEL)	3	1	2	2	4	−2	96	105	−9	
4	Anastasiya Cherniavskaya / Alesia Zaitsava (BLR)	3	0	3	0	6	−6	77	126	−49	

Source: TS

Date		Score		Set 1	Set 2	Set 3
24 June; 09:00	Lise Jaques (Belgium); Flore Vandenhoucke (Belgium)	2–0	(Belarus) Anastasiya Cherniavskaya (Belarus) Alesia Zaitsava	21–10	21–11	
24 June; 09:40	Émilie Lefel (France); Anne Tran (France)	2–0	(Estonia) Kati-Kreet Marran (Estonia) Helina Rüütel	21–19	23–21	
25 June; 17:20	Émilie Lefel (France); Anne Tran (France)	2–0	(Belgium) Lise Jaques (Belgium) Flore Vandenhoucke	21–16	21–11	
25 June; 18:00	Kati-Kreet Marran (Estonia); Helina Rüütel (Estonia)	2–0	(Belarus) Anastasiya Cherniavskaya (Belarus) Alesia Zaitsava	21–13	21–17	
26 June; 09:40	Kati-Kreet Marran (Estonia); Helina Rüütel (Estonia)	2–0	(Belgium) Lise Jaques (Belgium) Flore Vandenhoucke	21–13	21–14	
26 June; 10:30	Émilie Lefel (France); Anne Tran (France)	2–0	(Belarus) Anastasiya Cherniavskaya (Belarus) Alesia Zaitsava	21–16	21–10	

==== Group D ====
Pos	Team	Pld	W	L	GF	GA	GD	PF	PA	PD	Qualification
1	Selena Piek / Cheryl Seinen (NED) [4]	3	3	0	6	0	+6	126	79	+47	Qualification to knock-out stage
2	Bengisu Erçetin / Nazlıcan İnci (TUR)	3	2	1	4	2	+2	111	102	+9	Qualification to knock-out stage
3	Johanna Goliszewski / Lara Käpplein (GER)	3	1	2	2	4	−2	103	110	−7	
4	Alžběta Bášová / Michaela Fuchsová (CZE)	3	0	3	0	6	−6	78	127	−49	

Source: TS

Date		Score		Set 1	Set 2	Set 3
24 June; 10:30	Selena Piek (Netherlands); Cheryl Seinen (Netherlands)	2–0	(Germany) Johanna Goliszewski (Germany) Lara Käpplein	21–19	21–14	
24 June; 16:00	Alžběta Bášová (Czech Republic); Michaela Fuchsová (Czech Republic)	0–2	(Turkey) Bengisu Erçetin (Turkey) Nazlıcan İnci	12–21	20–22	
25 June; 15:00	Johanna Goliszewski (Germany); Lara Käpplein (Germany)	0–2	(Turkey) Bengisu Erçetin (Turkey) Nazlıcan İnci	11–21	17–21	
25 June; 16:40	Selena Piek (Netherlands); Cheryl Seinen (Netherlands)	2–0	(Czech Republic) Alžběta Bášová (Czech Republic) Michaela Fuchsová	21–11	21–9	
26 June; 12:20	Johanna Goliszewski (Germany); Lara Käpplein (Germany)	2–0	(Czech Republic) Alžběta Bášová (Czech Republic) Michaela Fuchsová	21–13	21–13	
26 June; 13:45	Selena Piek (Netherlands); Cheryl Seinen (Netherlands)	2–0	(Turkey) Bengisu Erçetin (Turkey) Nazlıcan İnci	21–12	21–14	

=== Knock-out stage ===
Quarterfinals
Chloe Birch (GBR); Lauren Smith (GBR)	21	21
Bengisu Erçetin (TUR); Nazlıcan İnci (TUR)	12	18
3	Émilie Lefel (FRA); Anne Tran (FRA)	21	25
Emma Karlsson (SWE); Johanna Magnusson (SWE)	15	23
1	Maiken Fruergaard (DEN); Sara Thygesen (DEN)	13	14
4	Selena Piek (NED); Cheryl Seinen (NED)	21	21
Kati-Kreet Marran (EST); Helina Rüütel (EST)	14	15
2	Ekaterina Bolotova (RUS); Alina Davletova (RUS)	21	21

Semifinals
Chloe Birch (GBR); Lauren Smith (GBR)	21	21
3	Émilie Lefel (FRA); Anne Tran (FRA)	13	13
4	Selena Piek (NED); Cheryl Seinen (NED)	18	22	21
2	Ekaterina Bolotova (RUS); Alina Davletova (RUS)	21	20	14

Final
Chloe Birch (GBR); Lauren Smith (GBR)	21	13	15
4	Selena Piek (NED); Cheryl Seinen (NED)	14	21	21
