= Sophie Brown =

Sophie Brown may refer to:

- Sophie Brown (badminton) (born 1993), English badminton player
- Sophie Willmott-Brown, a character on the BBC soap opera EastEnders
- Sophie Brown (The Inbetweeners), a character from the British sitcom The Inbetweeners
