= Naja Mohamed =

Egyptian badminton player (born 1996)

Personal information
- Born: Naja Tarek Mohamed; 15 March 1996 (age 30)

Sport
- Country: Egypt
- Sport: Badminton

Women's singles & doubles
- Highest ranking: 261 (WS 6 March 2014); 172 (WD 27 February 2014); 155 (XD 6 March 2015)
- BWF profile

Naja Tarek Mohamed (born 15 March 1996) is an Egyptian badminton player. She won the women's doubles title at the 2013 Morocco International partnered with Doha Hany.

== Achievements ==
=== BWF International Challenge/Series ===
Women's doubles
Year	Tournament	Partner	Opponent	Score	Result
2013	Ethiopia International	(Egypt) Doha Hany	(Ethiopia) Firehiwot Getachew (Ethiopia) Yerusksew Tura	15–21, 19–21	(silver) Runner-up
2013	Morocco International	(Egypt) Doha Hany	(Morocco) Harag Nazik (Morocco) Rajae Rochdy	28–26, 21–13	(gold) Winner

Mixed doubles
Year	Tournament	Partner	Opponent	Score	Result
2013	Ethiopia International	(Egypt) Adham Hatem Elgamal	(Egypt) Abdelrahman Abdelhakim (Egypt) Doha Hany	14–21, 11–21	(silver) Runner-up
2013	Morocco International	(Egypt) Adham Hatem Elgamal	(Netherlands) Vincent de Vries (Netherlands) Gayle Mahulette	10–21, 7–21	(silver) Runner-up

BWF International Challenge tournament
BWF International Series tournament
BWF Future Series tournament
