= Myke Halkema =

Dutch badminton player (born 1994)

Personal information
- Born: 29 July 1994 (age 32)

Sport
- Country: Netherlands
- Sport: Badminton

Women's & mixed doubles
- Highest ranking: 175 (WD 23 October 2014); 125 (XD 27 March 2014)
- BWF profile
Medal record
Women's badminton
Representing Netherlands
European Junior Championships
Silver medal – second place	2013 Ankara	Mixed doubles
Bronze medal – third place	2013 Ankara	Mixed team

Myke Halkema (born 29 July 1994) is a Dutch badminton player, specializing in doubles play. She won a silver medal at the 2013 European Junior Badminton Championships in mixed doubles and a bronze medal in mixed team.

== Achievements ==
=== European Junior Championships ===
Mixed doubles
Year	Venue	Partner	Opponent	Score	Result
2013	ASKI Sport Hall; Ankara, Turkey	(Netherlands) Robin Tabeling	(Denmark) David Daugaard (Denmark) Maiken Fruergaard	15–21, 18–21	Silver

=== BWF International Challenge/Series ===
Women's doubles
Year	Tournament	Partner	Opponent	Score	Result
2014	Estonian International	(Netherlands) Gayle Mahulette	(Russia) Anastasia Chervyakova (Russia) Nina Vislova	9–21, 12–21	(silver) Runner-up
2015	Dutch International	(Netherlands) Lisa Malaihollo	(Netherlands) Gayle Mahulette (Netherlands) Cheryl Seinen	14–21, 21–23	(silver) Runner-up
2016	Dutch International	(Netherlands) Lisa Malaihollo	(England) Chloe Birch (England) Sophie Brown	4–21, 15–21	(silver) Runner-up

Mixed doubles
Year	Tournament	Partner	Opponent	Score	Result
2013	Hungarian International	(Netherlands) Robin Tabeling	(Indonesia) Indra Viki Okvana (Indonesia) Megawati Gustiani	21–17, 21–17	(gold) Winner
2014	Dutch International	(Netherlands) Robin Tabeling	(Denmark) Niclas Nøhr (Denmark) Sara Thygesen	10–21, 5–21	(silver) Runner-up
2017	Dutch International	(Netherlands) Jim Middelburg	(Finland) Anton Kaisti (Finland) Jenny Nyström	18–21, 18–21	(silver) Runner-up

BWF International Challenge tournament
BWF International Series tournament
BWF Future Series tournament
