= Chan Yan Kit =

Hong Kong badminton player (born 1985)

Chan Yan Kit 陳仁傑
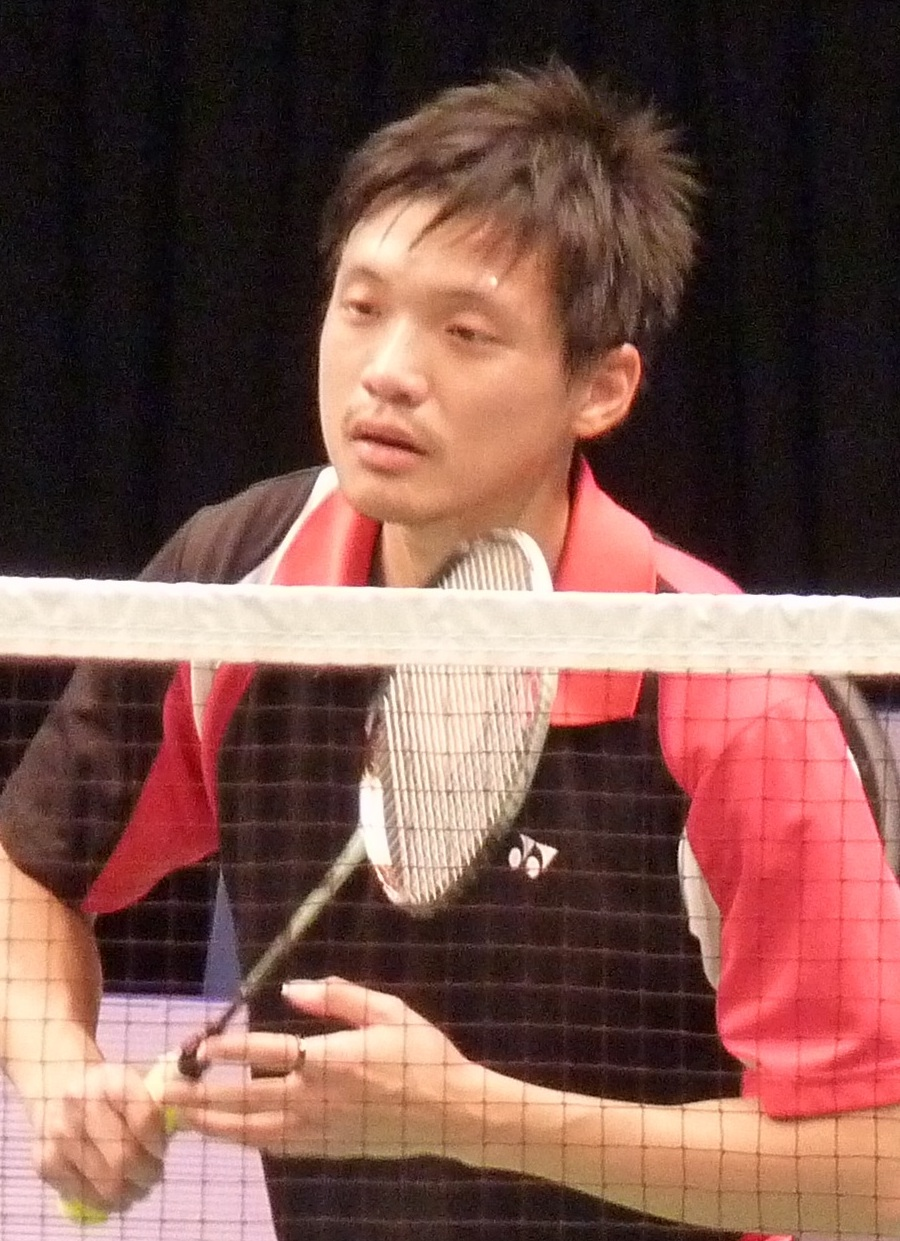
- Chan at the 2013 Dutch Open Grand Prix

Personal information
- Born: 10 December 1985 (age 40) Hong Kong
- Height: 1.73 m (5 ft 8 in)
- Weight: 71 kg (157 lb)

Sport
- Country: Hong Kong
- Sport: Badminton
- Handedness: Right

Men's singles
- Highest ranking: 9 (25 June 2009)
- BWF profile

Chan Yan Kit (Chinese: 陳仁傑; Jyutping: can^{4} jan^{4} git^{6}, born 10 December 1985) is a badminton player from Hong Kong. He competed at the Asian Games from 2006 to 2014.

== Career ==
He competed at the 2006 IBF World Championships in men's singles and was defeated in the first round by Eric Pang. The next year he reached the quarterfinals at the 2007 Badminton Asia Championships, losing against Yeoh Kay Bin 13–21, 21–9, 21–14. In 2009, he won the men's singles title at the New Zealand Open Grand Prix tournament. In 2012, he also won the Swedish Masters.

== Achievements ==
=== BWF Grand Prix ===
The BWF Grand Prix had two levels, the Grand Prix and Grand Prix Gold. It was a series of badminton tournaments sanctioned by the Badminton World Federation (BWF) and played between 2007 and 2017. The World Badminton Grand Prix was sanctioned by the International Badminton Federation from 1983 to 2006.

Men's singles
Year	Tournament	Opponent	Score	Result
2005	New Zealand Open	(Malaysia) Sairul Amar Ayob	8–15, 16–17	(silver) Runner-up
2008	Vietnam Open	(Vietnam) Nguyễn Tiến Minh	22–24, 18–21	(silver) Runner-up
2009	New Zealand Open	(Hong Kong) Wong Wing Ki	21–9, 21–9	(gold) Winner
2013	Dutch Open	(Hong Kong) Wei Nan	15–21, 18–21	(silver) Runner-up

BWF Grand Prix Gold tournament
BWF Grand Prix tournament

=== BWF International Challenge/Series ===
Men's singles

Year	Tournament	Partner	Opponent	Score	Result
2012	Swedish Masters	(Netherlands) Eric Pang	21–17, 21–19	(gold) Winner	

BWF International Challenge tournament
BWF International Series tournament
