= Morocco International =

The Morocco International is an international badminton tournament held in Morocco since 2010. The first tournament has been an International Series level.

== Previous winners ==
Year	Men's singles	Women's singles	Men's doubles	Women's doubles	Mixed doubles
2018–2019	cancelled				
2017	(France) Lucas Claerbout	(Slovakia) Martina Repiska	(France) Florent Riancho (United States) Bjorn Seguin	(Estonia) Kristin Kuuba (Estonia) Helina Rüütel	(Slovakia) Milan Dratva (Slovakia) Martina Repiska
2016	no competition				
2015	(Portugal) Pedro Martins	(Belgium) Lianne Tan	(Malaysia) Ridzwan Rahmat (Malaysia) Misbun Shawal Misbun	(Latvia) Iava Pope (Latvia) Kristine Sefere	(France) Vincent Espen (France) Manon Krieger
2014	(Portugal) Pedro Martins	(Belgium) Lianne Tan	(Turkey) Sinan Zorlu (Turkey) Yusuf Ramazan Bay	(Turkey) Kader Inal (Turkey) Fatma Nur Yavuz	(Turkey) Melih Turgut (Turkey) Fatma Nur Yavuz
2013	(Netherlands) Vincent de Vries	(Portugal) Telma Santos	(India) Vineeth Manuel (India) Arjun Reddy Pochana	(Egypt) Doha Hany (Egypt) Naja Mohamed	(Netherlands) Vincent de Vries (Netherlands) Gayle Mahulette
2012	No Competition				
2011	(Spain) Pablo Abián	(Spain) Carolina Marín	(Germany) Ingo Kindervater (Germany) Johannes Schöttler	(Germany) Birgit Michels (Germany) Sandra Marinello	(Germany) Michael Fuchs (Germany) Birgit Michels
2010	(Portugal) Pedro Martins	(Egypt) Alaa Fatty	(France) Oliver Fossy (France) Jean-Michel Lefort	(Morocco) Arba Nawar (Morocco) Rajae Rochdy	(Egypt) Abdelrahman Kashkal (Egypt) Alaa Fatty
