= 2019 European Mixed Team Badminton Championships =

Tournament details
- Dates: 13–17 February 2019
- Venue: Frederiksberghallen
- Location: Copenhagen, Denmark

The 2019 European Mixed Team Badminton Championships was held in Copenhagen, Denmark, between 13–17 February 2019 and organised by Badminton Europe and Denmark's Badminton Union.

== Qualification ==
=== Direct qualifiers ===
- Denmark (host country)

=== Qualification stage ===
The qualification stage was held between 7–9 December 2018 in 7 cities across Europe.

| Group | Host city | Qualified team | Teams failed to qualify |
|---|---|---|---|
| 1 | (England) Milton Keynes | England | Belgium; Hungary; Italy |
| 2 | (Moldova) Ciorescu | Russia | Moldova; Scotland; Ukraine |
| 3 | (Portugal) Caldas da Rainha | Netherlands | Iceland; Portugal; Switzerland |
| 4 | (France) Aire-sur-la-Lys | France | Estonia; Faroe Islands; Slovakia |
| 5 | (Germany) Erlangen | Germany | Austria; Slovenia; Sweden |
| 6 | (Poland) Sobotka | Spain | Czech Republic; Lithuania; Poland |
| 7 | (Bulgaria) Sofia | Ireland | Bulgaria; Finland |
| 7 | (Bulgaria) Sofia | Ireland | Israel; Latvia; Norway^{§} |

§: Subgroup's winner.

== Group stage ==
=== Group 1 ===
| Rank | Team | Pld | W | L | MF | MA | MD | Pts |
|---|---|---|---|---|---|---|---|---|
| 1 | Denmark | 3 | 3 | 0 | 13 | 2 | +11 | 3 |
| 2 | Netherlands | 3 | 2 | 1 | 8 | 7 | +1 | 2 |
| 3 | France | 3 | 1 | 2 | 6 | 9 | −3 | 1 |
| 4 | Spain | 3 | 0 | 3 | 3 | 12 | −9 | 0 |

13 February
| Denmark | 4–1 | France |
| Netherlands | 3–2 | Spain |
14 February
| Denmark | 4–1 | Netherlands |
| France | 4–1 | Spain |
15 February
| Denmark | 5–0 | Spain |
| France | 1–4 | Netherlands |

=== Group 2 ===
| Rank | Team | Pld | W | L | MF | MA | MD | Pts |
|---|---|---|---|---|---|---|---|---|
| 1 | Russia | 3 | 3 | 0 | 12 | 3 | +9 | 3 |
| 2 | Germany | 3 | 2 | 1 | 7 | 8 | −1 | 2 |
| 3 | England | 3 | 1 | 2 | 9 | 6 | +3 | 1 |
| 4 | Ireland | 3 | 0 | 3 | 2 | 13 | −11 | 0 |

13 February
| England | 2–3 | Russia |
| Ireland | 1–4 | Germany |
14 February
| England | 5–0 | Ireland |
| Russia | 5–0 | Germany |
15 February
| England | 2–3 | Germany |
| Russia | 4–1 | Ireland |

== Knockout stage ==
Semi-finals
16 February, 14:00
Denmark | 3
Netherlands | 0
16 February, 10:00
Germany | 3
Russia | 1

Final
17 February, 14:00
Denmark | 3
Germany | 0

=== Semifinals ===
Denmark
3
Frederiksberghallen, Court 1
16 February 2019 14:00 UTC+1

Netherlands
0

| | | | 1 | 2 | 3 |
|---|---|---|---|---|---|---|
| 1 | (Denmark) (Netherlands) | Mathias Christiansen / Christinna Pedersen; Robin Tabeling / Selena Piek | 21; 19 | 21; 15 |
| 2 | (Denmark) (Netherlands) | Viktor Axelsen; Mark Caljouw | 21; 7 | 8; 21 | 21; 16 |
| 3 | (Denmark) (Netherlands) | Mia Blichfeldt; Gayle Mahulette | 22; 20 | 21; 10 |
| 4 | (Denmark) (Netherlands) | Kim Astrup / Anders Skaarup Rasmussen; Jelle Maas / Robin Tabeling | | | | not played |
| 5 | (Denmark) (Netherlands) | Alexandra Bøje / Maiken Fruergaard; Selena Piek / Cheryl Seinen | | | | not played |

Germany
3
Frederiksberghallen, Court 1
16 February 2019 10:00 UTC+1

Russia
1

| | | | 1 | 2 | 3 |
|---|---|---|---|---|---|---|
| 1 | (Germany) (Russia) | Mark Lamsfuß / Isabel Herttrich; Vladimir Ivanov / Ekaterina Bolotova | 22; 20 | 21; 10 |
| 2 | (Germany) (Russia) | Kai Schäfer; Vladimir Malkov | 13; 21 | 21; 14 | 16; 21 |
| 3 | (Germany) (Russia) | Yvonne Li; Evgeniya Kosetskaya | 17; 21 | 21; 16 | 21; 17 |
| 4 | (Germany) (Russia) | Mark Lamsfuß / Marvin Emil Seidel; Vladimir Ivanov / Ivan Sozonov | 21; 14 | 21; 19 |
| 5 | (Germany) (Russia) | Johanna Goliszewski / Lara Käpplein; Ekaterina Bolotova / Alina Davletova | | | | not played |

=== Final ===
Denmark
3
Frederiksberghallen, Court 1
17 February 2019 14:00 UTC+1

Germany
0

| | | | 1 | 2 | 3 |
|---|---|---|---|---|---|---|
| 1 | (Denmark) (Germany) | Mathias Christiansen / Christinna Pedersen; Mark Lamsfuß / Isabel Herttrich | 21; 12 | 21; 12 |
| 2 | (Denmark) (Germany) | Anders Antonsen; Max Weißkirchen | 21; 9 | 21; 13 |
| 3 | (Denmark) (Germany) | Line Kjærsfeldt; Yvonne Li | 21; 16 | 21; 17 |
| 4 | (Denmark) (Germany) | Kim Astrup / Anders Skaarup Rasmussen; Mark Lamsfuß / Marvin Emil Seidel | | | | not played |
| 5 | (Denmark) (Germany) | Maiken Fruergaard / Christinna Pedersen; Linda Efler / Isabel Herttrich | | | | not played |
