= Vincent de Vries =

Dutch badminton player (born 1994)

Personal information
- Born: 21 June 1994 (age 32)

Sport
- Country: Netherlands
- Sport: Badminton

Men's singles & doubles
- Highest ranking: 168 (MS 17 April 2014); 585 (MD 21 March 2014); 357 (XD 12 June 2014)
- BWF profile

Vincent de Vries (born 21 June 1994) is a Dutch badminton player. He plays in the men's singles event for the latest. In 2015, he ended to playing badminton and chose to continue his studies at the Johan Cruijf University in Tilburg.

== Achievements ==
=== BWF International Challenge/Series ===
Men's singles
| Year | Tournament | Opponent | Score | Result |
|---|---|---|---|---|
| 2013 | Morocco International | (India) Kirtesh Dhindhwal | 21–11, 21–18 | (gold) Winner |

Mixed doubles
| Year | Tournament | Partner | Opponent | Score | Result |
|---|---|---|---|---|---|
| 2013 | Morocco International | (Netherlands) Gayle Mahulette | (Egypt) Adham Hatem Elgamal (Egypt) Naja Mohamed | 21–10, 21–7 | (gold) Winner |

Commonwealth Youth Games tournament
BWF International Series tournament
BWF Future Series tournament
