= Lisa Malaihollo =

Dutch badminton player (born 1987)

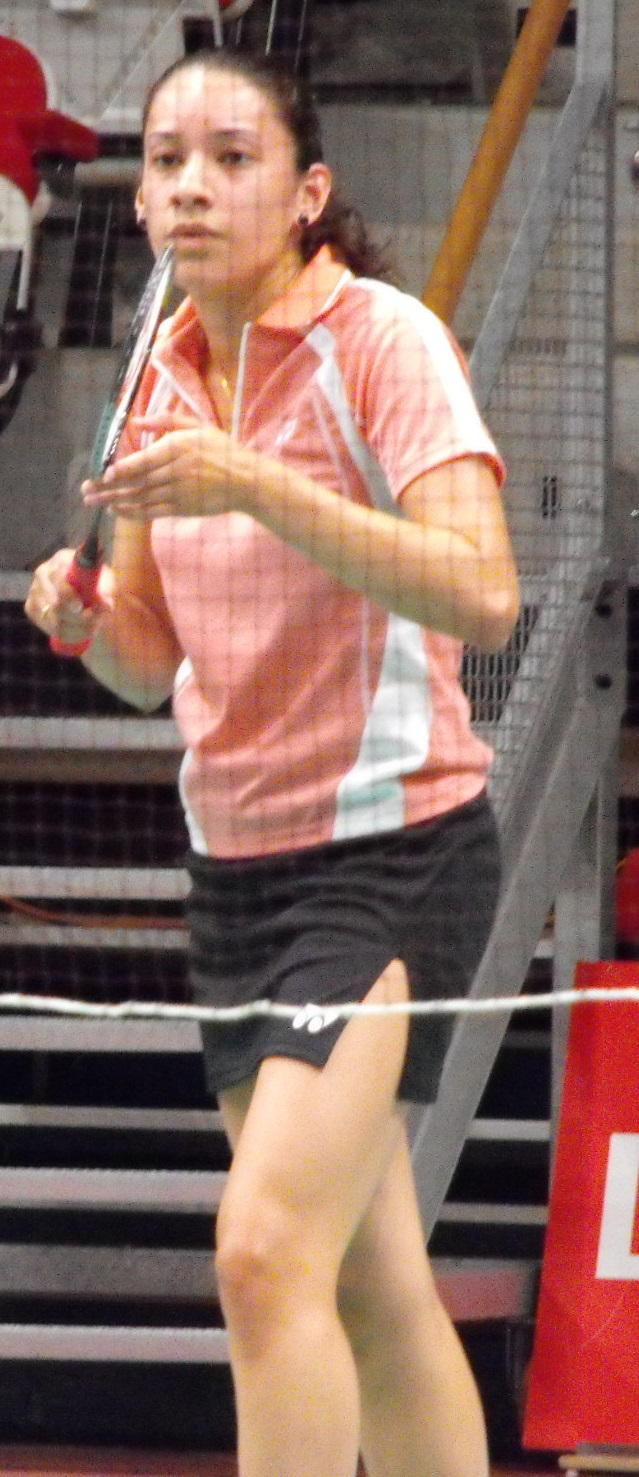

Personal information
- Born: Lisa Malaihollo; 9 July 1987 (age 39) Tilburg, Netherlands

Sport
- Country: Netherlands
- Sport: Badminton

Women's singles & doubles
- Highest ranking: 309 (WS, 16 November 2012); 202 (WD, 6 October 2011); 271 (XD, 3 May 2012)
- BWF profile

Lisa Khoeblal-Malaihollo (born 9 July 1987) is a Dutch badminton player, who was specialized in doubles play at the end of her career. Her father is from Indonesian origin, while her mother is of mixed Dutch-Surinamese origin. From 2006 till her retirement in 2017 she won numerous Satellite and Master events in the Netherlands both in singles and in doubles play. In the Women's Doubles event most of the time Lisa used to play with her friend Yvonne Sie, which she used to call "her little sister". With her Lisa had won the Dutch National Junior U-19 girls doubles title in 2006. She reached the semi-finals three times in the Women's Singles event at the National Championships in 2011, 2013 and 2014. She also reached the semi-finals in the Women's doubles event at the Nationals five times. Four times with Yvonne Sie in 2012, 2013, 2014 and 2015 and one time with Myke Halkema in 2016. She won the Dutch Eredivisie league with her club Velo Wateringen six times (2006, 2010, 2012, 2014, 2016 and 2017) since she joined the first team in 2006. Together with her club Velo she also won runners-up spot at the Europa Cup in 2011. She was the lead singles player at her club for many years before also specializing in the doubles and mixed doubles events.

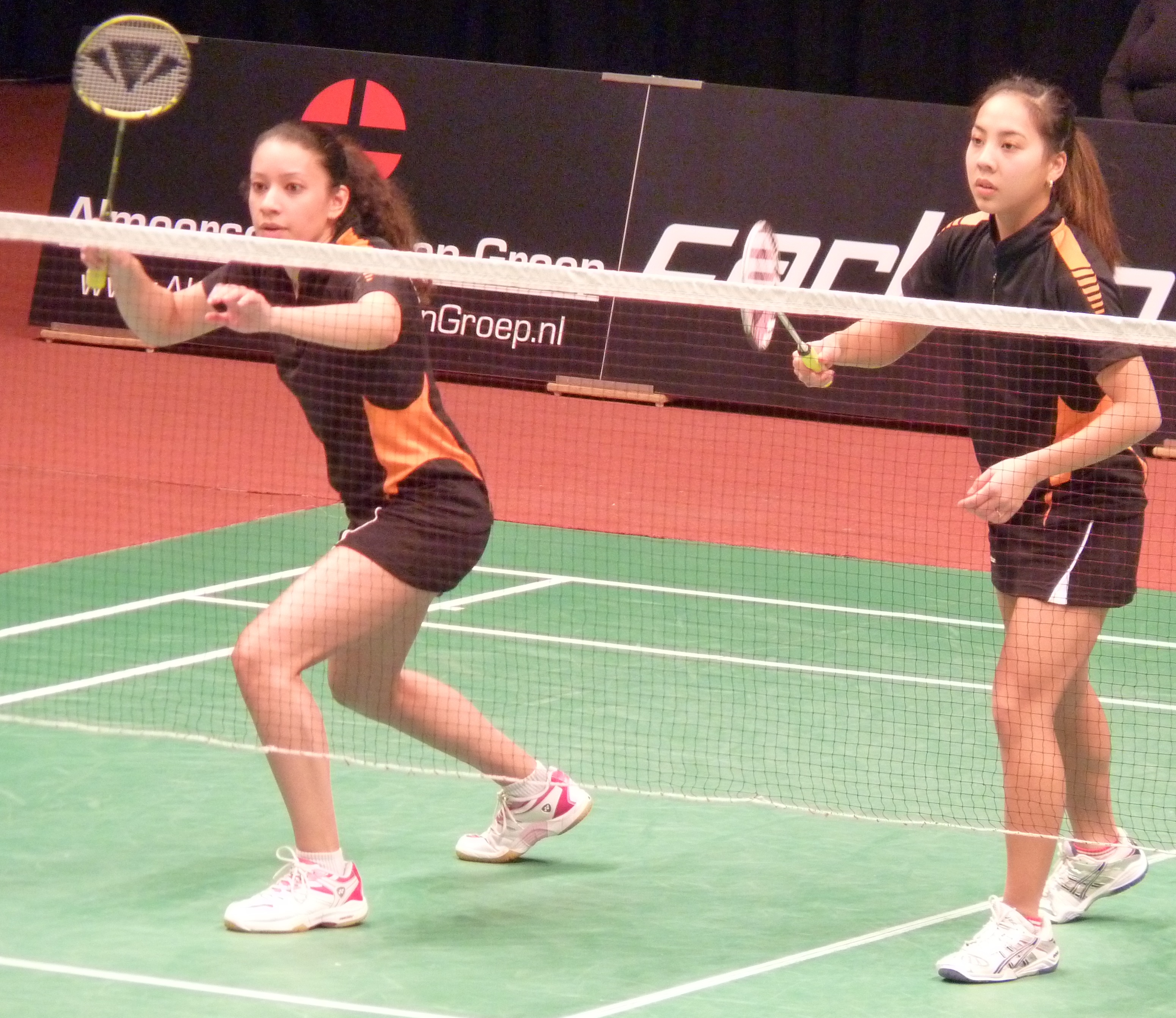
Lisa Malaihollo and Yvonne Sie

== Achievements ==
=== BWF International Challenge/Series ===
Women's doubles
Year	Tournament	Partner	Opponent	Score	Result
2015	Dutch International	(Netherlands) Myke Halkema	(Netherlands) Gayle Mahulette (Netherlands) Cheryl Seinen	14–21, 21–23	(silver) Runner-up
2016	Dutch International	(Netherlands) Myke Halkema	(England) Chloe Birch (England) Sophie Brown	4-21, 15–21	(silver) Runner-up

BWF International Challenge tournament
BWF International Series tournament
BWF Future Series tournament
