= Frederiksberghallen =

Indoor sports arena in Copenhagen, Denmark

Coordinates: 55°40′35″N 12°29′50″E

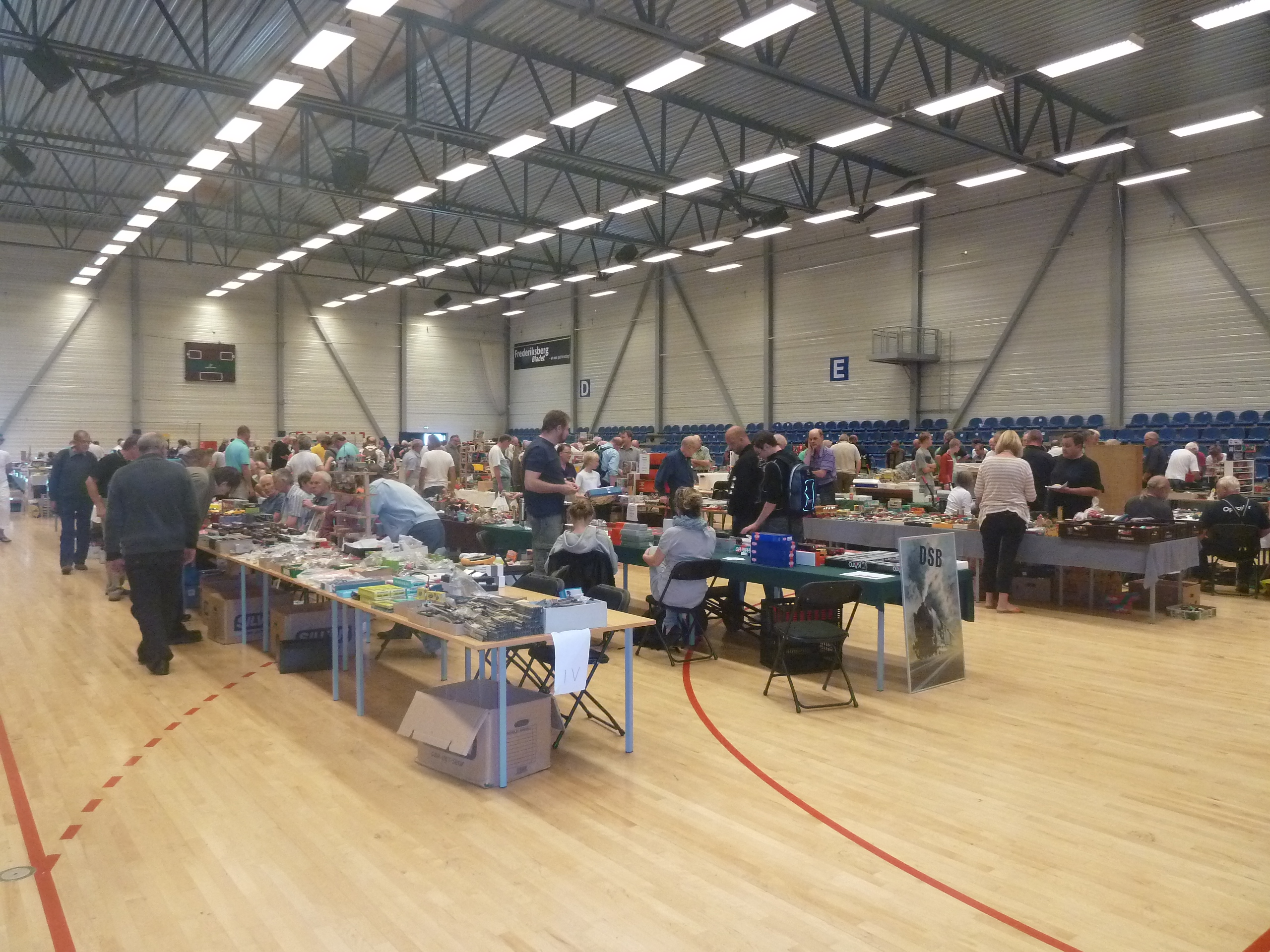

Frederiksberghallen is an indoor sports arena in Copenhagen, Denmark primarily used for handball. The arena can hold 1,400 spectators, 940 of them being seats (with a further 400 in a standing area if needed). It is home for København Håndbold. Previously, it has been the home of FCK Håndbold.
