= Sophie Brown (badminton) =

English badminton player (born 1993)

Personal information
- Born: 12 February 1993 (age 33) Leeds, England
- Height: 1.65 m (5 ft 5 in)

Sport
- Country: England
- Sport: Badminton
- Handedness: Right
- Coached by: Julian Robertson

Women's
- Highest ranking: 45 (WD) 15 Oct 2015; 76 (XD) 19 Mar 2015
- Current ranking: 65 (WD) (25 Aug 2016)
- BWF profile
Medal record
Women's badminton
Representing England
European Mixed Team Championships
Silver medal – second place	2015 Leuven	Mixed team

Sophie Brown (born 12 February 1993) is a badminton player from England.

== Achievements ==
=== BWF International Challenge/Series ===
Women's doubles
Year	Tournament	Partner	Opponent	Score	Result
2016	Dutch International	(England) Chloe Birch	(Netherlands) Myke Halkema (Netherlands) Lisa Malaihollo	21–4, 21–15	(gold) Winner
2015	Swedish Masters	(England) Kate Robertshaw	(Russia) Anastasia Chervyakova (Russia) Nina Vislova	21–17, 21–23, 14–21	(silver) Runner-up
2014	Welsh International	(England) Kate Robertshaw	(England) Heather Olver (England) Lauren Smith	11–21, 17–21	(silver) Runner-up

Mixed doubles

Year	Tournament	Opponent	Partner	Score	Result
2014	Welsh International	(England) Christopher Coles	(Germany) Max Weisskirchen (Germany) Eva Janssens	18–21, 21–16, 21–14	(gold) Winner

BWF International Challenge tournament
BWF International Series tournament
BWF Future Series tournament
