= Chloe Birch =

English badminton player (born 1995)

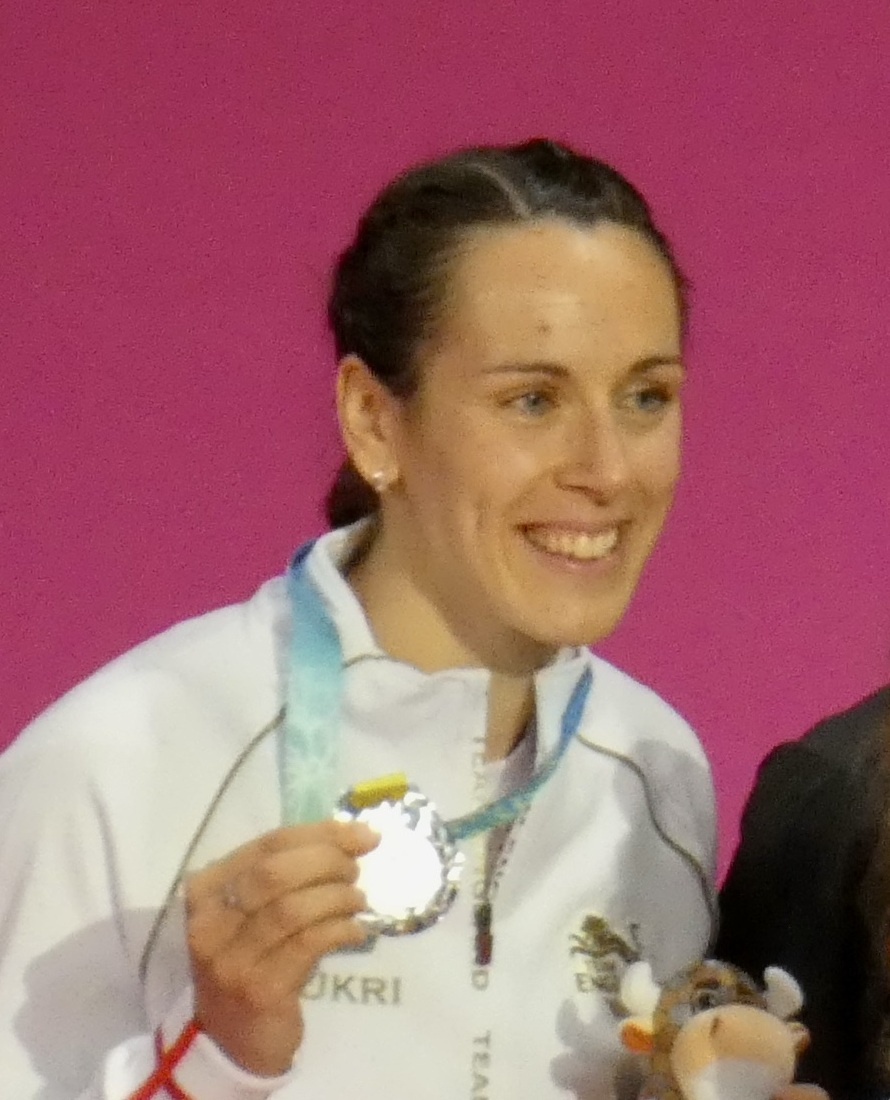
- Birch at the 2022 Commonwealth Games medal ceremony.

Personal information
- Full name: Chloe Francesca Hannah Coney
- Born: Chloe Francesca Hannah Birch; 16 September 1995 (age 31) Preston, England
- Height: 1.68 m (5 ft 6 in)
- Weight: 68 kg (150 lb)

Sport
- Country: England
- Sport: Badminton
- Handedness: Right
- Coached by: Mike Adams; Alex Marritt

Women's singles & doubles
- Highest ranking: 42 (WS 9 April 2019); 12 (WD with Lauren Smith 25 January 2022)
- BWF profile
Medal record
Women's badminton
Representing Great Britain
European Games
Silver medal – second place	2019 Minsk	Women's doubles
Representing England
Commonwealth Games
Silver medal – second place	2022 Birmingham	Women's doubles
Bronze medal – third place	2018 Gold Coast	Mixed team
European Championships
Silver medal – second place	2021 Kyiv	Women's doubles
European Mixed Team Championships
Silver medal – second place	2015 Leuven	Mixed team
Bronze medal – third place	2017 Lubin	Mixed team
Bronze medal – third place	2023 Aire-sur-la-Lys	Mixed team

Chloe Francesca Hannah Coney (née Birch; born 16 September 1995) is an English badminton player.

== Career ==
She was introduced to badminton through school and started playing at age eight at Abbeydale Badminton Club. Birch received the Michael Vaughan Award from Silverdale School, and competed at the Australian Youth Olympic Festival in 2013. She was the runner-up in 2016 English National Championships women's singles.

Birch graduated from Loughborough University with sport and exercise science degree.

Birch was part of the English team that won the mixed team bronze at the 2018 Commonwealth Games in Gold Coast. She won the women's doubles silver medal at the 2019 European Games partnered with Lauren Smith.

In 2023, she won the doubles national title (her seventh national title) at the English National Badminton Championships, at the David Ross Sports Village in Nottingham. The following year in 2024, she won an eighth title and this moved her to joint 10th in the all time list for women.

== Achievements ==
=== Commonwealth Games ===
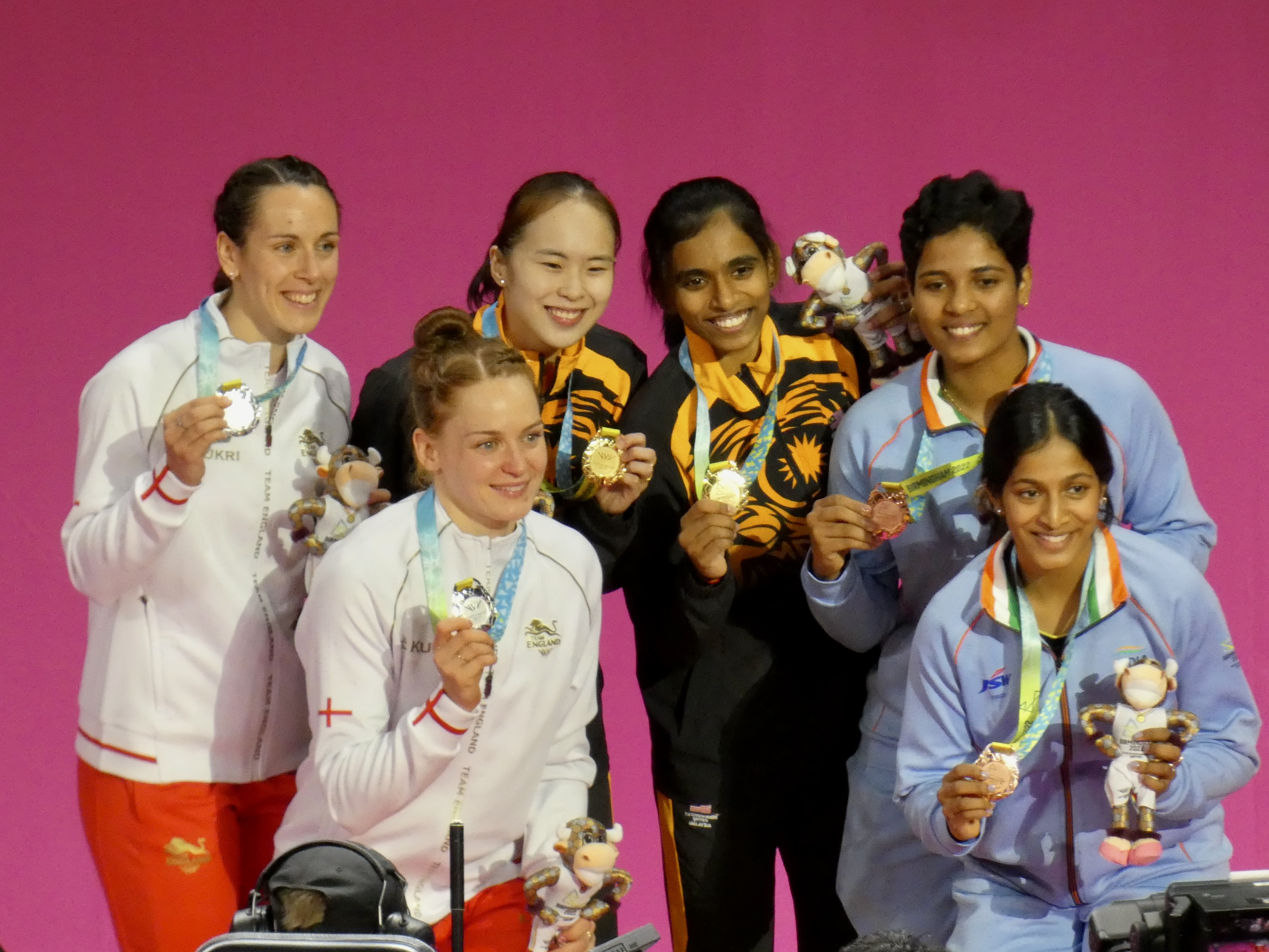
The six medallists in the women's badminton doubles at the 2022 Commonwealth Games in Birmingham. Left to right: Chloe Birch and Lauren Smith (England), Pearly Tan and Thinaah Muralitharan (Malaysia), Treesa Jolly and Gayathri Gopichand (India).

Women's doubles
Year	Venue	Partner	Opponent	Score	Result
2022	National Exhibition Centre, Birmingham, England	(England) Lauren Smith	(Malaysia) Pearly Tan (Malaysia) Thinaah Muralitharan	5–21, 8–21	Silver

=== European Games ===
Women's doubles
Year	Venue	Partner	Opponent	Score	Result
2019	Falcon Club; Minsk, Belarus	(United Kingdom) Lauren Smith	(Netherlands) Selena Piek (Netherlands) Cheryl Seinen	21–14, 13–21, 15–21	Silver

=== European Championships ===
Women's doubles
Year	Venue	Partner	Opponent	Score	Result
2021	Palace of Sports; Kyiv, Ukraine	(England) Lauren Smith	(Bulgaria) Gabriela Stoeva (Bulgaria) Stefani Stoeva	14–21, 19–21	Silver

=== BWF World Tour (1 title, 1 runner-up) ===
The BWF World Tour, which was announced on 19 March 2017 and implemented in 2018, is a series of elite badminton tournaments sanctioned by the Badminton World Federation (BWF). The BWF World Tour is divided into levels of World Tour Finals, Super 1000, Super 750, Super 500, Super 300, and the BWF Tour Super 100.

Women's doubles
Year	Tournament	Level	Partner	Opponent	Score	Result
2019	Orléans Masters	Super 100	(England) Lauren Smith	(Chinese Taipei) Hsu Ya-ching (Chinese Taipei) Hu Ling-fang	21–18, 21–17	(gold) Winner
2019	SaarLorLux Open	Super 100	(England) Lauren Smith	(China) Liu Xuanxuan (China) Xia Yuting	16–21, 13–21	(silver) Runner-up

=== BWF International Challenge/Series (10 titles, 15 runners-up) ===
Women's singles
Year	Tournament	Opponent	Score	Result
2015	Romanian International	(Belgium) Lianne Tan	7–11, 7–11, 10–12	(silver) Runner-up
2015	Hungarian International	(Indonesia) Aprilia Yuswandari	19–21, 9–21	(silver) Runner-up
2016	Portugal International	(Denmark) Mia Blichfeldt	12–21, 14–21	(silver) Runner-up

Women's doubles
Year	Tournament	Partner	Opponent	Score	Result
2015	Romanian International	(England) Jenny Wallwork	(France) Léa Palermo (France) Anne Tran	11–6, 14–21, 8–11, 11–8	(gold) Winner
2015	Slovenia International	(England) Jenny Wallwork	(Germany) Linda Efler (Germany) Lara Kaepplein	18–21, 21–19, 18–21	(silver) Runner-up
2015	Polish International	(England) Jessica Pugh	(Sweden) Clara Nistad (Sweden) Emma Wengberg	16–21, 21–6, 15–21	(silver) Runner-up
2016	Iceland International	(England) Jenny Wallwork	(England) Jessica Pugh (England) Sarah Walker	10–21, 21–10, 17–21	(silver) Runner-up
2016	Portugal International	(England) Sarah Walker	(Malaysia) Goh Yea Ching (Malaysia) Peck Yen Wei	9–21, 15–21	(silver) Runner-up
2016	Dutch International	(England) Sophie Brown	(Netherlands) Myke Halkema (Netherlands) Lisa Malaihollo	21–4, 21–15	(gold) Winner
2016	Slovenia International	(England) Sarah Walker	(England) Jessica Pugh (Netherlands) Cheryl Seinen	22–20, 21–19	(gold) Winner
2016	Belgian International	(England) Lauren Smith	(Denmark) Julie Finne-Ipsen (Denmark) Rikke Søby Hansen	24–22, 18–21, 21–18	(gold) Winner
2018	Czech Open	(England) Lauren Smith	(France) Émilie Lefel (France) Anne Tran	21–14, 21–14	(gold) Winner
2019	Denmark International	(England) Lauren Smith	(Japan) Saori Ozaki (Japan) Akane Watanabe	13–21, 18–21	(silver) Runner-up
2019	Azerbaijan International	(England) Lauren Smith	(Russia) Ekaterina Bolotova (Russia) Alina Davletova	21–18, 21–12	(gold) Winner
2019	Kharkiv International	(England) Lauren Smith	(Canada) Rachel Honderich (Canada) Kristen Tsai	21–14, 21–18	(gold) Winner
2022	Dutch Open	(England) Lauren Smith	(Netherlands) Debora Jille (Netherlands) Cheryl Seinen	10–5 retired	(silver) Runner-up
2022	Welsh International	(England) Lauren Smith	(France) Margot Lambert (France) Anne Tran	21–9, 14–21, 9–21	(silver) Runner-up
2024	Estonian International	(England) Estelle van Leeuwen	(Turkey) Bengisu Erçetin (Turkey) Nazlıcan İnci	21–23, 21–16, 8–21	(silver) Runner-up
2024	Portugal International	(England) Estelle van Leeuwen	(England) Abbygael Harris (England) Annie Lado	21–16, 21–9	(gold) Winner
2024	Luxembourg Open	(England) Estelle van Leeuwen	(Japan) Miki Kanehiro (Japan) Rui Kiyama	14–21, 13–21	(silver) Runner-up
2024	Nantes International	(England) Estelle van Leeuwen	(England) Abbygael Harris (England) Annie Lado	21–18, 21–9	(gold) Winner
2024	Dutch Open	(England) Estelle van Leeuwen	(Bulgaria) Gabriela Stoeva (Bulgaria) Stefani Stoeva	15–21, 18–21	(silver) Runner-up
2024	Irish Open	(England) Estelle van Leeuwen	(Denmark) Natasja Anthonisen (Denmark) Maiken Fruergaard	19–21, 19–21	(silver) Runner-up
2024	Scottish Open	(England) Estelle van Leeuwen	(Netherlands) Debora Jille (Denmark) Sara Thygesen	14–21, 21–10, 8–21	(silver) Runner-up

Mixed doubles
Year	Tournament	Partner	Opponent	Score	Result
2024	Portugal International	(England) Ethan van Leeuwen	(England) Rory Easton (England) Lizzie Tolman	18–21, 21–6, 21–17	(gold) Winner

BWF International Challenge tournament
BWF International Series tournament
