= Gayle Mahulette =

Dutch badminton player (born 1993)

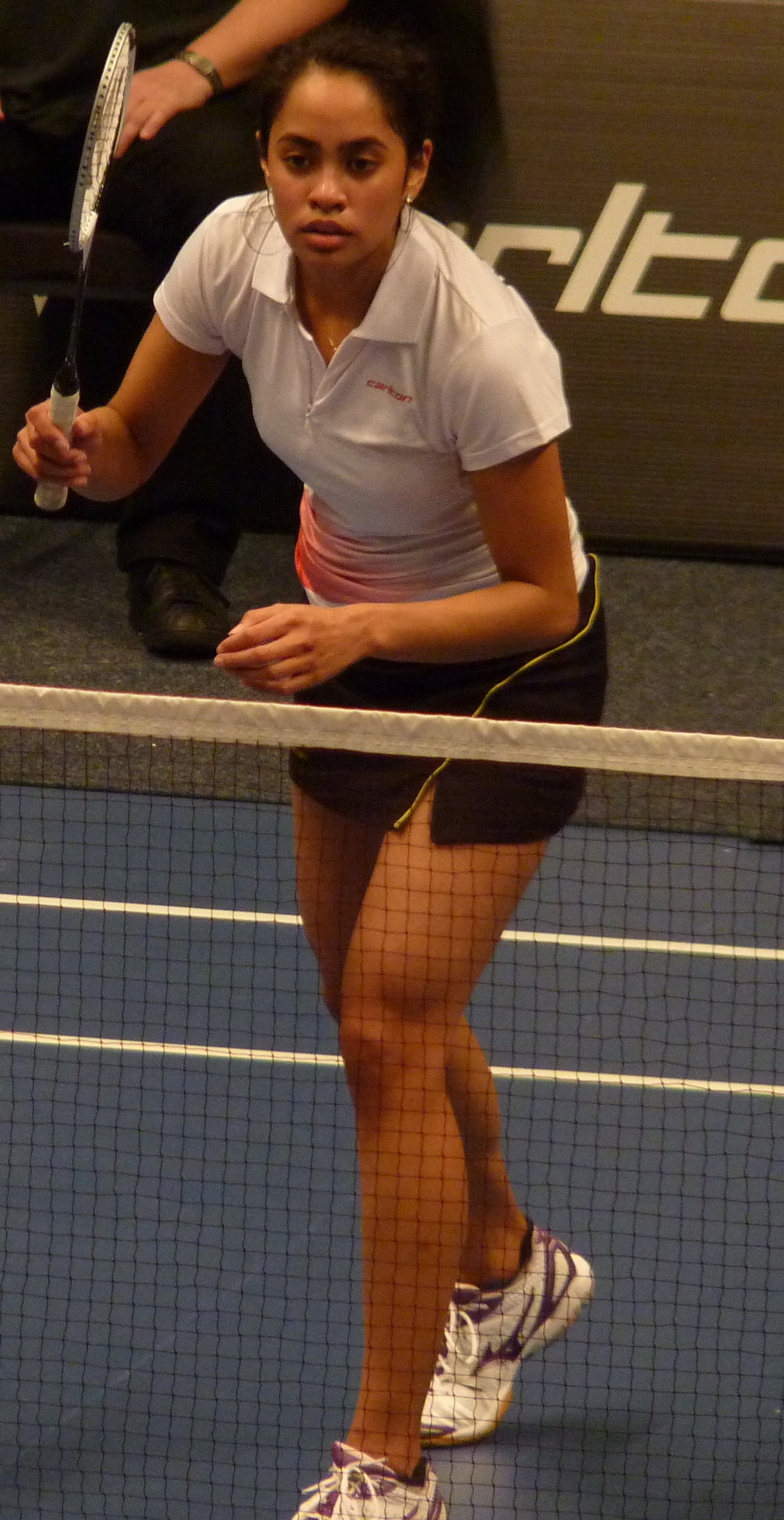

Personal information
- Born: 17 April 1993 (age 33) Arnhem, Netherlands
- Height: 1.68 m (5 ft 6 in)

Sport
- Country: Netherlands
- Sport: Badminton
- Handedness: Right

Women's singles & doubles
- Highest ranking: 73 (WS 26 October 2017); 175 (WD 23 October 2014); 357 (XD 12 June 2014)
- BWF profile
Medal record
Women's badminton
Representing Netherlands
European Mixed Team Championships
Bronze medal – third place	2019 Copenhagen	Mixed team

Gayle Mahulette (born 17 April 1993) is a Dutch badminton player. Born in Arnhem, the Netherlands, Mahulette is a Moluccan descent. She won the Dutch National Championships in 2014, 2017 and 2018.

== Achievements ==
=== BWF International Challenge/Series ===
Women's singles
Year	Tournament	Opponent	Score	Result
2013	Morocco International	(Portugal) Telma Santos	12–21, 10–21	(silver) Runner-up
2015	Slovak Open	(Czech Republic) Kristína Gavnholt	10–21, 15–21	(silver) Runner-up
2018	Welsh International	(Spain) Clara Azurmendi	21–12, 6–21, 12–21	(silver) Runner-up

Women's doubles
Year	Tournament	Partner	Opponent	Score	Result
2013	Lithuanian International	(Netherlands) Alida Chen	(Russia) Irina Khlebko (Russia) Ksenia Polikarpova	10–21, 13–21	(silver) Runner-up
2014	Estonian International	(Netherlands) Myke Halkema	(Russia) Anastasia Chervyakova (Russia) Nina Vislova	9–21, 12–21	(silver) Runner-up
2015	Dutch International	(Netherlands) Cheryl Seinen	(Netherlands) Myke Halkema (Netherlands) Lisa Malaihollo	21–14, 23–21	(gold) Winner
2015	Slovak Open	(Netherlands) Cheryl Seinen	(Slovenia) Nika Arih (Slovenia) Petra Polanc	21–13, 21–16	(gold) Winner

Mixed doubles
Year	Tournament	Partner	Opponent	Score	Result
2013	Morocco International	(Netherlands) Vincent de Vries	(Egypt) Adham Hatem Elgamal (Egypt) Naja Mohamed	21–10, 21–7	(gold) Winner

BWF International Challenge tournament
BWF International Series tournament
BWF Future Series tournament
