= Maiken Fruergaard =

Danish badminton player (born 1995)

Personal information
- Born: Maiken Fruergaard Sørensen; 11 May 1995 (age 31) Odense, Denmark
- Years active: 2012–present
- Height: 1.69 m (5 ft 7 in)

Sport
- Country: Denmark
- Sport: Badminton
- Handedness: Right

Women's & mixed doubles
- Highest ranking: 14 (WD with Sara Thygesen 15 January 2019); 37 (XD with Søren Gravholt 6 April 2017)
- Current ranking: 49 (WD with Sara Thygesen); 54 (WD with Natasja Anthonisen) (15 April 2025)
- BWF profile
Medal record
Women's badminton
Representing Denmark
European Championships
Silver medal – second place	2025 Horsens	Women's doubles
Bronze medal – third place	2016 La Roche-sur-Yon	Women's doubles
Bronze medal – third place	2018 Huelva	Women's doubles
Bronze medal – third place	2021 Kyiv	Women's doubles
Bronze medal – third place	2022 Madrid	Women's doubles
European Mixed Team Championships
Gold medal – first place	2017 Lubin	Mixed team
Gold medal – first place	2019 Copenhagen	Mixed team
Gold medal – first place	2021 Vantaa	Mixed team
Gold medal – first place	2023 Aire-sur-la-Lys	Mixed team
Gold medal – first place	2025 Baku	Mixed team
European Women's Team Championships
Gold medal – first place	2014 Basel	Women's team
Gold medal – first place	2016 Kazan	Women's team
Gold medal – first place	2018 Kazan	Women's team
Gold medal – first place	2020 Liévin	Women's team
Gold medal – first place	2024 Łódź	Women's team
European Junior Championships
Gold medal – first place	2013 Ankara	Mixed doubles
Gold medal – first place	2013 Ankara	Mixed team

Maiken Fruergaard Sørensen (born 11 May 1995) is a Danish badminton player, specializing in doubles play. As a junior player, she was the gold medalists at the 2013 European Junior Championships in the team and mixed doubles events, and in 2014, she entered the national team.

== Career ==
Fruergaard competed at the 2020 Tokyo Olympics partnering Sara Thygesen. Her pace at the Games was stopped in the group stage after placing 4th in the group C standings.

== Achievements ==
=== European Championships ===
Women's doubles
Year	Venue	Partner	Opponent	Score	Result
2016	Vendéspace; La Roche-sur-Yon, France	(Denmark) Sara Thygesen	(Netherlands) Eefje Muskens (Netherlands) Selena Piek	17–21, 17–21	Bronze
2018	Palacio de los Deportes Carolina Marín; Huelva, Spain	(Denmark) Sara Thygesen	(Bulgaria) Gabriela Stoeva (Bulgaria) Stefani Stoeva	10–21, 18–21	Bronze
2021	Palace of Sports; Kyiv, Ukraine	(Denmark) Sara Thygesen	(Bulgaria) Gabriela Stoeva (Bulgaria) Stefani Stoeva	16–21, 10–21	Bronze
2022	Polideportivo Municipal Gallur; Madrid, Spain	(Denmark) Sara Thygesen	(Germany) Linda Efler (Germany) Isabel Lohau	22–20, 15–21, 20–22	Bronze
2025	Forum; Horsens, Denmark	(Denmark) Natasja Anthonisen	(Bulgaria) Gabriela Stoeva (Bulgaria) Stefani Stoeva	11–21, 16–21	Silver

=== European Junior Championships ===
Mixed doubles
Year	Venue	Partner	Opponent	Score	Result
2013	Aski Sports Hall; Ankara, Turkey	(Denmark) David Daugaard	(Netherlands) Robin Tabeling (Netherlands) Myke Halkema	21–15, 21–18	Gold

=== BWF World Tour (2 runners-up) ===
The BWF World Tour, which was announced on 19 March 2017 and implemented in 2018, is a series of elite badminton tournaments sanctioned by the Badminton World Federation (BWF). The BWF World Tour is divided into levels of World Tour Finals, Super 1000, Super 750, Super 500, Super 300, and the BWF Tour Super 100.

Women's doubles
Year	Tournament	Level	Partner	Opponent	Score	Result
2020	Indonesia Masters	Super 500	(Denmark) Sara Thygesen	(Indonesia) Greysia Polii (Indonesia) Apriyani Rahayu	21–18, 11–21, 21–23	(silver) Runner-up
2023	U.S. Open	Super 300	(Denmark) Sara Thygesen	(China) Liu Shengshu (China) Tan Ning	19–21, 19–21	(silver) Runner-up

=== BWF Grand Prix (1 runner-up) ===
The BWF Grand Prix had two levels, the Grand Prix and Grand Prix Gold. It was a series of badminton tournaments sanctioned by the Badminton World Federation (BWF) and played between 2007 and 2017.

Mixed doubles
Year	Tournament	Partner	Opponent	Score	Result
2016	Dutch Open	(Denmark) Søren Gravholt	(Denmark) Mathias Christiansen (Denmark) Sara Thygesen	18–21, 22–20, 16–21	(silver) Runner-up

BWF Grand Prix Gold tournament
BWF Grand Prix tournament

=== BWF International Challenge/Series (5 titles, 3 runners-up) ===
Women's doubles
Year	Tournament	Partner	Opponent	Score	Result
2013	Spanish International	(Denmark) Sara Thygesen	(England) Heather Olver (England) Kate Robertshaw	21–18, 13–21, 20–22	(silver) Runner-up
2014	Dutch International	(Denmark) Sara Thygesen	(Netherlands) Samantha Barning (Netherlands) Iris Tabeling	16–21, 12–21	(silver) Runner-up
2015	Croatian International	(Denmark) Camilla Martens	(Denmark) Julie Finne-Ipsen (Denmark) Ditte Søby Hansen	21–16, 19–21, 21–19	(gold) Winner
2015	Belgian International	(Denmark) Sara Thygesen	(Malaysia) Joyce Choong Wai Chi (Malaysia) Yap Cheng Wen	21–18, 21–11	(gold) Winner
2016	Swedish Masters	(Denmark) Sara Thygesen	(Netherlands) Samantha Barning (Netherlands) Iris Tabeling	21–19, 21–17	(gold) Winner
2023	Irish Open	(Denmark) Sara Thygesen	(Bulgaria) Gabriela Stoeva (Bulgaria) Stefani Stoeva	21–19, 17–21, 24–22	(gold) Winner
2024	Irish Open	(Denmark) Natasja Anthonisen	(England) Chloe Birch (England) Estelle van Leeuwen	21–19, 21–19	(gold) Winner

Mixed doubles
Year	Tournament	Partner	Opponent	Score	Result
2015	Norwegian International	(Denmark) Søren Gravholt	(Australia) Sawan Serasinghe (Australia) Setyana Mapasa	17–21, 15–21	(silver) Runner-up

BWF International Challenge tournament
BWF International Series tournament
BWF Future Series tournament
