= Lara Käpplein =

German badminton player (born 1995)

Personal information
- Born: 25 May 1995 (age 31) Bruchsal, Germany
- Height: 1.64 m (5 ft 5 in)

Sport
- Country: Germany
- Sport: Badminton
- Handedness: Right

Women's & mixed doubles
- Highest ranking: 32 (WD 9 August 2018); 154 (XD 12 July 2018)
- BWF profile
Medal record
Women's badminton
Representing Germany
European Mixed Team Championships
Silver medal – second place	2019 Copenhagen	Mixed team
Bronze medal – third place	2017 Lubin	Mixed team
European Women's Team Championships
Silver medal – second place	2018 Kazan	Women's team
Silver medal – second place	2020 Liévin	Women's team
Bronze medal – third place	2016 Kazan	Women's team
European Junior Championships
Bronze medal – third place	2013 Ankara	Mixed team

Lara Käpplein (German pronunciation: [ˈlaːʁa ˈkɛplaɪ̯n]; born 25 May 1995) is a German badminton player. Together with German national team, she won the silver medals in the 2018 and 2020 European Women's Team Championships, and also at the 2019 European Mixed Team Championships.

== Achievements ==
=== BWF International Challenge/Series (2 titles, 1 runner-up) ===
Women's doubles
Year	Tournament	Partner	Opponent	Score	Result
2015	Slovenian International	(Germany) Linda Efler	(England) Chloe Birch (England) Jenny Wallwork	21–18, 19–21, 21–18	(gold) Winner
2017	Kharkiv International	(Germany) Johanna Goliszewski	(Ukraine) Maria Ulitina (Ukraine) Natalya Voytsekh	21–15, 21–14	(gold) Winner

Mixed doubles
Year	Tournament	Partner	Opponent	Score	Result
2024	Croatian International	(Germany) Jonathan Dresp	(Serbia) Mihajlo Tomić (Serbia) Andjela Vitman	21–19, 19–21, 19–21	(silver) Runner-up

BWF International Challenge tournament
BWF International Series tournament
BWF Future Series tournament
