= Robin Tabeling =

Dutch badminton player (born 1994)

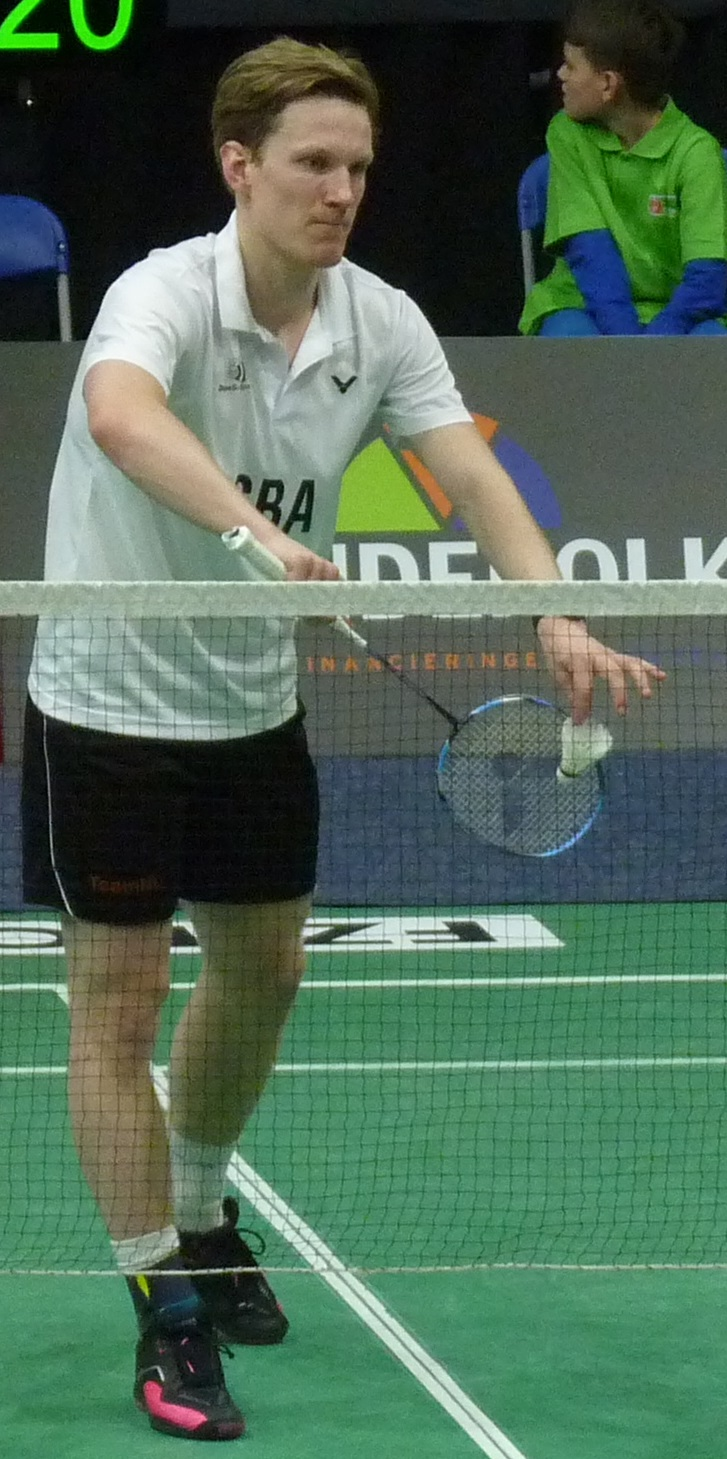

Personal information
- Born: 24 April 1994 (age 32) Amstelveen, Netherlands
- Years active: 2012–present
- Height: 1.80 m (5 ft 11 in)
- Weight: 82 kg (181 lb)

Sport
- Country: Netherlands
- Sport: Badminton
- Handedness: Right
- Coached by: Ruud Bosch; Henri Vervoort

Men's & mixed doubles
- Highest ranking: 26 (MD with Jelle Maas, 27 September 2018); 8 (XD with Selena Piek, 18 July 2023)
- BWF profile
Medal record
Men's badminton
Representing Netherlands
European Games
Gold medal – first place	2023 Kraków-Małopolska	Mixed doubles
Bronze medal – third place	2019 Minsk	Men's doubles
European Championships
Bronze medal – third place	2018 Huelva	Men's doubles
Bronze medal – third place	2022 Madrid	Mixed doubles
Bronze medal – third place	2024 Saarbrücken	Mixed doubles
European Mixed Team Championships
Bronze medal – third place	2019 Copenhagen	Mixed team
European Men's Team Championships
Silver medal – second place	2020 Liévin	Men's team
European Junior Championships
Silver medal – second place	2013 Ankara	Mixed doubles
Bronze medal – third place	2013 Ankara	Mixed team

Robin Tabeling (born 24 April 1994) is a Dutch badminton player, specializing in doubles play. He started playing badminton in Amstelveen at a club called BV van Zijderveld. He won a silver medal at the 2013 European Junior Championships in the mixed doubles event and a bronze medal in team event. Partnered with Jelle Maas, he won bronze medals at the 2018 European Championships and 2019 European Games. He competed at the 2020 Tokyo Summer Olympics and also at the 2024 Paris Summer Olympics. Tabeling won a gold medal with Selena Piek in the mixed doubles event at the 2023 European Games.

== Achievements ==
=== European Games ===
Men's doubles
Year	Venue	Partner	Opponent	Score	Result
2019	Falcon Club; Minsk, Belarus	(Netherlands) Jelle Maas	(United Kingdom) Marcus Ellis (United Kingdom) Chris Langridge	18–21, 16–21	Bronze

Mixed doubles
Year	Venue	Partner	Opponent	Score	Result
2023	Arena Jaskółka; Tarnów, Poland	(Netherlands) Selena Piek	(France) Thom Gicquel (France) Delphine Delrue	21–10, 13–21, 21–13	Gold

=== European Championships ===
Men's doubles
Year	Venue	Partner	Opponent	Score	Result
2018	Palacio de los Deportes Carolina Marín; Huelva, Spain	(Netherlands) Jelle Maas	(Denmark) Kim Astrup (Denmark) Anders Skaarup Rasmussen	15–21, 18–21	Bronze

Mixed doubles
Year	Venue	Partner	Opponent	Score	Result
2022	Polideportivo Municipal Gallur; Madrid, Spain	(Netherlands) Selena Piek	(France) Thom Gicquel (France) Delphine Delrue	19–21, 15–21	Bronze
2024	Saarlandhalle; Saarbrücken, Germany	(Netherlands) Selena Piek	(Denmark) Mathias Christiansen (Denmark) Alexandra Bøje	23–25, 23–21, 18–21	Bronze

=== European Junior Championships ===
Mixed doubles
Year	Venue	Partner	Opponent	Score	Result
2013	ASKI Sport Hall; Ankara, Turkey	(Netherlands) Myke Halkema	(Denmark) David Daugaard (Denmark) Maiken Fruergaard	15–21, 18–21	Silver

=== BWF World Tour (2 titles, 2 runners-up) ===
The BWF World Tour, which was announced on 19 March 2017 and implemented in 2018, is a series of elite badminton tournaments sanctioned by the Badminton World Federation (BWF). The BWF World Tour is divided into levels of World Tour Finals, Super 1000, Super 750, Super 500, Super 300, and the BWF Tour Super 100.

Men's doubles
Year	Tournament	Level	Partner	Opponent	Score	Result
2018	Dutch Open	Super 100	(Netherlands) Jelle Maas	(Indonesia) Wahyu Nayaka (Indonesia) Ade Yusuf Santoso	19–21, 21–17, 11–21	(silver) Runner-up

Mixed doubles
Year	Tournament	Level	Partner	Opponent	Score	Result
2019	Dutch Open	Super 100	(Netherlands) Selena Piek	(England) Chris Adcock (England) Gabby Adcock	21–17, 21–13	(gold) Winner
2022	French Open	Super 750	(Netherlands) Selena Piek	(China) Zheng Siwei (China) Huang Yaqiong	16–21, 21–14, 20–22	(silver) Runner-up
2025	German Open	Super 300	(Denmark) Alexandra Bøje	(Indonesia) Rehan Naufal Kusharjanto (Indonesia) Gloria Emanuelle Widjaja	21–17, 21–12	(gold) Winner

=== BWF Grand Prix (1 title) ===
The BWF Grand Prix had two levels, the Grand Prix and Grand Prix Gold. It was a series of badminton tournaments sanctioned by the Badminton World Federation (BWF) and played between 2007 and 2017.

Men's doubles
Year	Tournament	Partner	Opponent	Score	Result
2017	Scottish Open	(Netherlands) Jelle Maas	(Netherlands) Jacco Arends (Netherlands) Ruben Jille	21–11, 21–15	(gold) Winner

BWF Grand Prix Gold tournament
BWF Grand Prix tournament

=== BWF International Challenge/Series (6 titles, 7 runners-up) ===
Men's doubles
Year	Tournament	Partner	Opponent	Score	Result
2017	Italian International	(Netherlands) Jelle Maas	(Poland) Miłosz Bochat (Poland) Adam Cwalina	23–21, 21–18	(gold) Winner
2019	Brazil International	(Netherlands) Jelle Maas	(India) Satwiksairaj Rankireddy (India) Chirag Shetty	14–21, 18–21	(silver) Runner-up

Mixed doubles
Year	Tournament	Partner	Opponent	Score	Result
2013	Hungarian International	(Netherlands) Myke Halkema	(Indonesia) Indra Viki Okvana (Indonesia) Megawati Gustiani	21–17, 21–17	(gold) Winner
2014	Dutch International	(Netherlands) Myke Halkema	(Denmark) Niclas Nøhr (Denmark) Sara Thygesen	10–21, 5–21	(silver) Runner-up
2016	Orleans International	(Netherlands) Samantha Barning	(Denmark) Mathias Christiansen (Denmark) Lena Grebak	14–21, 13–21	(silver) Runner-up
2016	Irish Open	(Netherlands) Cheryl Seinen	(Denmark) Mathias Christiansen (Denmark) Sara Thygesen	16–21, 16–21	(silver) Runner-up
2017	Spanish International	(Netherlands) Cheryl Seinen	(Republic of Ireland) Sam Magee (Republic of Ireland) Chloe Magee	11–21, 18–21	(silver) Runner-up
2019	Austrian Open	(Netherlands) Selena Piek	(Singapore) Danny Bawa Chrisnanta (Singapore) Tan Wei Han	19–21, 21–16, 21–12	(gold) Winner
2019	Brazil International	(Netherlands) Selena Piek	(Netherlands) Jacco Arends (Netherlands) Cheryl Seinen	16–21, 23–21, 21–17	(gold) Winner
2021	Dutch Open	(Netherlands) Selena Piek	(Denmark) Mikkel Mikkelsen (Denmark) Rikke Søby Hansen	18–21, 21–13, 15–21	(silver) Runner-up
2021	Irish Open	(Netherlands) Selena Piek	(Denmark) Mikkel Mikkelsen (Denmark) Rikke Søby Hansen	21–18, 21–15	(gold) Winner
2022	Dutch Open	(Netherlands) Selena Piek	(England) Callum Hemming (England) Jessica Pugh	21–17, 21–12	(gold) Winner
2024	Dutch Open	(Netherlands) Selena Piek	(England) Callum Hemming (England) Estelle van Leeuwen	21–17, 15–21, 20–22	(silver) Runner-up

BWF International Challenge tournament
BWF International Series tournament
BWF Future Series tournament
