= Cheryl Seinen =

Dutch badminton player

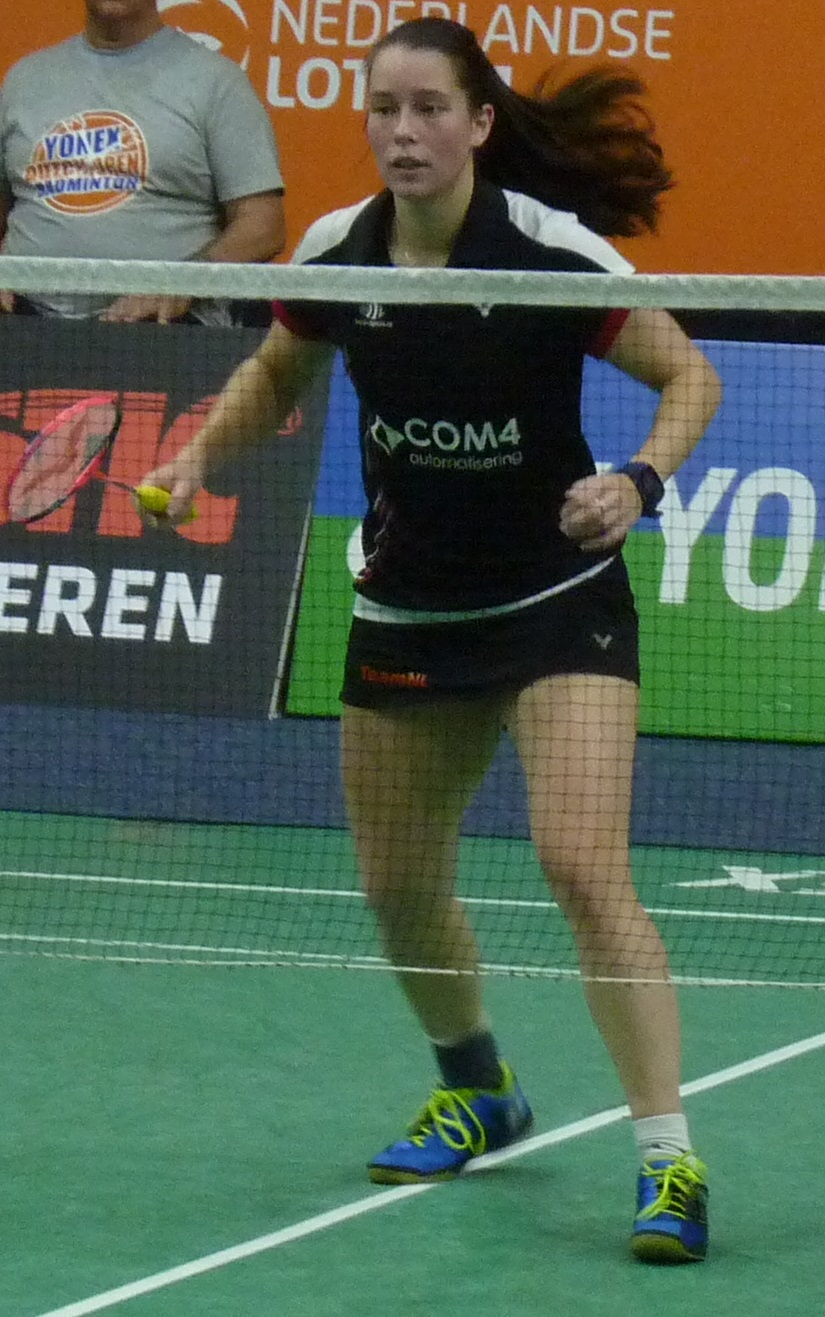

Personal information
- Born: 4 August 1995 (age 31) Roermond, Netherlands
- Height: 1.66 m (5 ft 5 in)
- Weight: 63 kg (139 lb)

Sport
- Country: Netherlands
- Sport: Badminton
- Handedness: Right

Women's & mixed doubles
- Highest ranking: 17 (WD with Selena Piek, 4 May 2021); 29 (XD with Robin Tabeling, 27 September 2018)
- BWF profile
Medal record
Women's badminton
Representing Netherlands
European Games
Gold medal – first place	2019 Minsk	Women's doubles
Silver medal – second place	2023 Kraków–Małopolska	Women's doubles
European Championships
Bronze medal – third place	2018 Huelva	Women's doubles
Bronze medal – third place	2021 Kyiv	Women's doubles
Bronze medal – third place	2024 Saarbrücken	Women's doubles
European Mixed Team Championships
Bronze medal – third place	2019 Copenhagen	Mixed team
European Junior Championships
Bronze medal – third place	2013 Ankara	Mixed team

Cheryl Seinen (born 4 August 1995) is a Dutch badminton player. She won the women's doubles gold medal at the 2019 European Games with Selena Piek, and later the silver medal in 2023 with Debora Jille. She also won two individual bronze medals at the European Badminton Championships.

== Career ==
Cheryl started playing badminton at a young age, brought to the sports hall by her parents, who were both former badminton players and now coaches in the Dutch city of Roermond. When she was 13 years old she moved away from her home to the Western part of the Netherlands to play badminton in Amstelveen for van Zijderveld. At age 15 she was called upon to join the Dutch National juniors squad in Papendal. After two and a half years she was removed from the National team, but fought her way back to the top and back into the National squad. Seinen has won the women's doubles events in Romania, Scotland, Slovakia, Switzerland, Belgium, Ireland and the Netherlands, and has also won mixed doubles events in Scandinavia. She won her home event, the Dutch Open twice with Debora Jille in 2022 and 2023 after finishing runners-up two times in 2018 (with Selena Piek) and 2021 (with Debora Jille). Together with Selena Piek she reached the semi-finals at the Thailand Masters (BWF World Tour Super 300) in 2019 and also the semi-finals at the All England in 2021 (BWF World Tour Super 1000). She competed at the 2020 Summer Olympics winning two matches and losing one match in group B, losing the quarter final match against the Korean opponents of Lee So-hee and Shin Seung-chan 8–21, 17–21. She has won the women's doubles title a total of six times at the Dutch National Badminton Championships from 2017 till 2020 with Selena Piek and in 2022 and 2023 together with current partner Debora Jille; and she has also won the mixed doubles title twice in 2017 and 2018 with Robin Tabeling. In the Dutch Eredivisie league, she is playing for BV Almere, while in Denmark in the Elite league her club is Vendsyssel Badminton Club.

== Achievements ==
=== European Games ===
Women's doubles
Year	Venue	Partner	Opponent	Score	Result	Ref.
2019	Falcon Club; Minsk, Belarus	(Netherlands) Selena Piek	(United Kingdom) Chloe Birch (United Kingdom) Lauren Smith	14–21, 21–13, 21–15	Gold	
2023	Arena Jaskółka; Tarnów, Poland	(Netherlands) Debora Jille	(Bulgaria) Gabriela Stoeva (Bulgaria) Stefani Stoeva	7–21, 17–21	Silver	

=== European Championships ===
Women's doubles
Year	Venue	Partner	Opponent	Score	Result
2018	Palacio de los Deportes Carolina Marín; Huelva, Spain	(Netherlands) Selena Piek	(France) Émilie Lefel (France) Anne Tran	21–17, 18–21, 19–21	Bronze
2021	Palace of Sports; Kyiv, Ukraine	(Netherlands) Selena Piek	(England) Chloe Birch (England) Lauren Smith	18–21, 16–21	Bronze
2024	Saarlandhalle; Saarbrücken, Germany	(Netherlands) Debora Jille	(France) Margot Lambert (France) Anne Tran	15–21, 12–21	Bronze

=== BWF World Tour (1 runner-up) ===
The BWF World Tour, which was announced on 19 March 2017 and implemented in 2018, is a series of elite badminton tournaments sanctioned by the Badminton World Federation (BWF). The BWF World Tour is divided into levels of World Tour Finals, Super 1000, Super 750, Super 500, Super 300, and the BWF Tour Super 100.

Women's doubles
Year	Tournament	Level	Partner	Opponent	Score	Result
2018	Dutch Open	Super 100	(Netherlands) Selena Piek	(Bulgaria) Gabriela Stoeva (Bulgaria) Stefani Stoeva	17–21, 18–21	(silver) Runner-up

=== BWF Grand Prix (1 title) ===
The BWF Grand Prix had two levels, the Grand Prix and Grand Prix Gold. It was a series of badminton tournaments sanctioned by the Badminton World Federation (BWF) and played between 2007 and 2017.

Women's doubles
Year	Tournament	Partner	Opponent	Score	Result
2017	Scottish Open	(Netherlands) Selena Piek	(Russia) Ekaterina Bolotova (Russia) Alina Davletova	15–21, 21–15, 21–11	(gold) Winner

BWF Grand Prix Gold tournament
BWF Grand Prix tournament

=== BWF International Challenge/Series (11 titles, 6 runners-up) ===
Women's doubles
Year	Tournament	Partner	Opponent	Score	Result
2014	Slovak Open	(Croatia) Katarina Galenić	(Poland) Magdalena Witek (Poland) Aneta Wojtkowska	11–7, 11–9, 5–11, 11–7	(gold) Winner
2015	Dutch International	(Netherlands) Gayle Mahulette	(Netherlands) Myke Halkema (Netherlands) Lisa Malaihollo	21–14, 23–21	(gold) Winner
2015	Slovak Open	(Netherlands) Gayle Mahulette	(Slovenia) Nika Arih (Slovenia) Petra Polanc	21–13, 21–16	(gold) Winner
2015	Finnish International	(Netherlands) Alida Chen	(Sweden) Clara Nistad (Sweden) Emma Wengberg	16–21, 20–22	(silver) Runner-up
2016	Romanian International	(England) Jessica Pugh	(Malaysia) Goh Yea Ching (Malaysia) Peck Yen Wei	21–19, 21–15	(gold) Winner
2016	Slovenia International	(England) Jessica Pugh	(England) Chloe Birch (England) Sarah Walker	20–22, 19–21	(silver) Runner-up
2016	Swiss International	(Netherlands) Iris Tabeling	(Malaysia) Amelia Alicia Anscelly (Malaysia) Teoh Mei Xing	13–21, 22–20, 21–10	(gold) Winner
2017	Belgian International	(Netherlands) Selena Piek	(Netherlands) Debora Jille (Netherlands) Imke van der Aar	21–14, 21–16	(gold) Winner
2021	Dutch Open	(Netherlands) Debora Jille	(Sweden) Johanna Magnusson (Sweden) Clara Nistad	21–17, 14–21, 12–21	(silver) Runner-up
2021	Irish Open	(Netherlands) Debora Jille	(Australia) Chen Hsuan-yu (Australia) Gronya Somerville	15–21, 21–14, 21–14	(gold) Winner
2022	Dutch Open	(Netherlands) Debora Jille	(England) Chloe Birch (England) Lauren Smith	5–10 retired	(gold) Winner
2023	Dutch Open	(Netherlands) Debora Jille	(Denmark) Julie Finne-Ipsen (Denmark) Mai Surrow	21–9, 21–13	(gold) Winner

Mixed doubles
Year	Tournament	Partner	Opponent	Score	Result
2014	Norwegian International	(Finland) Anton Kaisti	(Sweden) Filip Michael Duwall Myhren (Sweden) Emma Wengberg	21–15, 17–21, 21–14	(gold) Winner
2016	Iceland International	(Finland) Anton Kaisti	(Poland) Paweł Pietryja (Poland) Aneta Wojtkowska	22–20, 21–18	(gold) Winner
2016	Irish Open	(Netherlands) Robin Tabeling	(Denmark) Mathias Christiansen (Denmark) Sara Thygesen	16–21, 16–21	(silver) Runner-up
2017	Spanish International	(Netherlands) Robin Tabeling	(Republic of Ireland) Sam Magee (Republic of Ireland) Chloe Magee	11–21, 18–21	(silver) Runner-up
2019	Brazil International	(Netherlands) Jacco Arends	(Netherlands) Robin Tabeling (Netherlands) Selena Piek	21–16, 21–23, 17–21	(silver) Runner-up

BWF International Challenge tournament
BWF International Series tournament
BWF Future Series tournament
