= 2017 U.S. Open Grand Prix Gold =

Tournament details
- Dates: 19–23 July 2017
- Edition: 55
- Level: Grand Prix Gold
- Total prize money: US$120,000
- Venue: Anaheim Convention Center
- Location: Anaheim, California, United States

Champions
- Men's singles: (India) H. S. Prannoy
- Women's singles: (Japan) Aya Ohori
- Men's doubles: (Japan) Takuto Inoue (Japan) Yuki Kaneko
- Women's doubles: (South Korea) Lee So-hee (South Korea) Shin Seung-chan
- Mixed doubles: (South Korea) Seo Seung-jae (South Korea) Kim Ha-na

The 2017 U.S. Open Grand Prix Gold was the eleventh Grand tournament of the 2017 BWF Grand Prix Gold and Grand Prix, and the 55th edition of the U.S. Open badminton tournament. The tournament was held at the Anaheim Convention Center in Anaheim, California, United States from 19 to 23 July 2017 and had a total purse of $120,000.

== Men's singles ==
=== Seeds ===
1. (South Korea) Lee Hyun-il (first round)
2. (India) H. S. Prannoy (champion)
3. (France) Brice Leverdez (second round)
4. (Japan) Kazumasa Sakai (first round)
5. (India) Sameer Verma (quarterfinals)
6. (Malaysia) Zulfadli Zulkiffli (second round)
7. (Spain) Pablo Abián (third round)
8. (Japan) Kanta Tsuneyama (quarterfinals)
9. (Brazil) Ygor Coelho (third round)
10. (South Korea) Jeon Hyeok-jin (quarterfinals)
11. (Sweden) Henri Hurskainen (withdrew)
12. (Netherlands) Mark Caljouw (third round)
13. (France) Lucas Corvee (second round)
14. (France) Lucas Claerbout (second round)
15. (Vietnam) Nguyen Tien Minh (semifinals)
16. (Sri Lanka) Niluka Karunaratne (third round)

=== Finals ===
Quarterfinals
(India) Kashyap Parupalli	21	21
5	(India) Sameer Verma	13	16
(Japan) Koki Watanabe	16	21	9
(South Korea) Heo Kwang-hee	21	16	21
15	(Vietnam) Nguyen Tien Minh	21	21
10	(South Korea) Jeon Hyeok-jin	15	15
8	(Japan) Kanta Tsuneyama	21	15	18
2	(India) H. S. Prannoy	10	21	21

Semifinals
(India) Kashyap Parupalli	15	21	21
(South Korea) Heo Kwang-hee	21	15	16
15	(Vietnam) Nguyen Tien Minh	14	19
2	(India) H. S. Prannoy	21	21

Final
(India) Kashyap Parupalli	15	22	12
2	(India) H. S. Prannoy	21	20	21

=== Top half ===
==== Section 1 ====
First round
1	(South Korea) Lee H-i	16	21	19
(India) K Parupalli	21	10	21
(Canada) T Chiu	19	9
(Hungary) G Krausz	21	21
16	(Sri Lanka) N Karunaratne	15	21	21
(England) T Penty	21	9	8
(Vietnam) Pham C C	21	21
(Trinidad and Tobago) N Bonkowsky	12	5

Second round
(India) K Parupalli	21	17
(Hungary) G Krausz	18	6^{r}
16	(Sri Lanka) N Karunaratne	21	21
(Vietnam) Pham C C	9	15

Third round
(India) K Parupalli	21	21
16	(Sri Lanka) N Karunaratne	19	10

==== Section 2 ====
First round
5	(India) S Verma	21	21
(Vietnam) Nguyen H N	5	10
(Croatia) Z Durkinjak	21	21
(Austria) V Vattanirappel	11	11
9	(Brazil) Y Coelho	21	21
(United States) P Jap	18	12
(Mexico) L Munoz	21	21
(United States) Y T Chan	2	12

Second round
5	(India) S Verma	21	25	21
(Croatia) Z Durkinjak	19	27	15
9	(Brazil) Y Coelho	21	17	21
(Mexico) L Munoz	12	21	15

Third round
5	(India) S Verma	18	21	21
9	(Brazil) Y Coelho	21	14	18

==== Section 3 ====
First round
4	(Japan) K Sakai	15	20
(Scotland) K Merrilees	21	22
(United States) M Y Ong	17	21
(Indonesia) P Dewantoro	21	23
13	(France) L Corvee	21	21
PFR	(United States) S Lyu	10	9
PFR	(Panama) G Morales	3	4
(Japan) K Watanabe	21	21

Second round
(Scotland) K Merrilees	21	21
(Indonesia) P Dewantoro	13	10
13	(France) L Corvee	21	11	16
(Japan) K Watanabe	18	21	21

Third round
(Scotland) K Merrilees	13	10
(Japan) K Watanabe	21	21

==== Section 4 ====
First round
6	(Malaysia) Z Zulkiffli	21	21
(Austria) W Gnedt	9	11
(Austria) R Gnedt	0^{r}
(South Korea) Heo K-h	1
PFR	(United States) V Chiu	8	14
(Republic of Ireland) S Evans	21	21
PFR	(United States) P Garcia-Flores	2	5
(United States) T Lam	21	21

Second round
6	(Malaysia) Z Zulkiffli	11	15
(South Korea) Heo K-h	21	21
(Republic of Ireland) S Evans	21	21
(United States) T Lam	18	15

Third round
(South Korea) Heo K-h	2
(Republic of Ireland) S Evans	0^{r}

=== Bottom half ===
==== Section 5 ====
First round
(Mexico) A Hernandez	13	9
(India) H Dani	21	21
(England) S Parsons	21	13
15	(Vietnam) Nguyen T M	23	21
(Vietnam) Le D P	21	21	21
(Canada) K Golding	10	23	14
(United States) G N Gunawan	10	9
7	(Spain) P Abian	21	21

Second round
(India) H Dani	25	9
15	(Vietnam) Nguyen T M	27	21
(Vietnam) Le D P	17	21	19
7	(Spain) P Abian	21	18	21

Third round
15	(Vietnam) Nguyen T M	19	21	21
7	(Spain) P Abian	21	19	11

==== Section 6 ====
First round
(Mexico) J Castillo	13	9
(Japan) H Shimono	21	21
(United States) H Shu	21	11	23
10	(South Korea) Jeon H-j	14	21	25
(India) L Sarang	16	13
(Japan) K Nishimoto	21	21
(India) A Yelegar	17	21	13
3	(France) B Leverdez	21	16	21

Second round
(Japan) H Shimono	14	14
10	(South Korea) Jeon H-j	21	21
(Japan) K Nishimoto	21	21
3	(France) B Leverdez	17	17

Third round
10	(South Korea) Jeon H-j	21	21
(Japan) K Nishimoto	11	14

==== Section 7 ====
First round
(Canada) J A Ho-Shue	21	21
(Nepal) R Tamang	18	12
(United States) C Lin	8	5
14	(France) L Claerbout	21	21
(Malaysia) Z Zulkiffli	21	21
(United States) D Schoppe	5	6
(United States) K B Chan	9	18
8	(Japan) K Tsuneyama	21	21

Second round
(Canada) J A Ho-Shue	21	21
14	(France) L Claerbout	11	14
(Malaysia) Z Zulkiffli	15	17
8	(Japan) K Tsuneyama	21	21

Third round
(Canada) J A Ho-Shue	19	21
8	(Japan) K Tsuneyama	21	23

==== Section 8 ====
First round
(Guatemala) K Cordon	22	21	21
(United States) H L Lee	24	16	19
(Indonesia) A Yunanto	12	12
12	(Netherlands) M Caljouw	21	21
(United States) S Pongnairat	9	15
(Republic of Ireland) J Magee	21	21
(Austria) L Wraber	12	16
2	(India) H. S. Prannoy	21	21

Second round
(Guatemala) K Cordon	21	14	7
12	(Netherlands) M Caljouw	15	21	21
(Republic of Ireland) J Magee	13	17
2	(India) H. S. Prannoy	21	21

Third round
12	(Netherlands) M Caljouw	8	21	16
2	(India) H. S. Prannoy	21	14	21

== Women's singles ==
=== Seeds ===
1. (United States) Beiwen Zhang (quarterfinals)
2. (India) Saina Nehwal (withdrew)
3. (Japan) Aya Ohori (champion)
4. (Bulgaria) Linda Zetchiri (second round)
5. (South Korea) Lee Jang-mi (semifinals)
6. (Canada) Michelle Li (final)
7. (Denmark) Natalia Koch Rohde (quarterfinals)
8. (Vietnam) Vu Thi Trang (first round)

=== Finals ===
Semifinals
5	(South Korea) Lee Jang-mi	21	26	19
3	(Japan) Aya Ohori	14	28	21
6	(Canada) Michelle Li	16	21	21
(Scotland) Kirsty Gilmour	21	16	15

Final
3	(Japan) Aya Ohori	21	21
6	(Canada) Michelle Li	11	19

=== Top half ===
==== Section 1 ====
First round
1	(United States) B Zhang	21	21
(Hungary) A Korosi	10	8
(Japan) Y Hashimoto	21	17	21
(Ukraine) M Ulitina	17	21	13
5	(South Korea) Lee J-m	21	21
(England) F Chapman	12	18
(India) S K P Kudaravalli	21	21
(United States) M Chen	13	16

Second round
1	(United States) B Zhang	21	21
(Japan) Y Hashimoto	16	12
5	(South Korea) Lee J-m	21	21
(India) S K P Kudaravalli	11	10

Quarterfinals
1	(United States) B Zhang	18	26	19
5	(South Korea) Lee J-m	21	24	21

==== Section 2 ====
First round
3	(Japan) A Ohori	21	25	21
(India) R S Gadde	14	27	16
(India) S U R Chukka	25	13	16
(Netherlands) G Mahulette	23	21	21
7	(Denmark) N K Rohde	21	21
(Canada) B Tam	16	15
(India) R Das	21	21
(Canada) R Honderich	16	18

Second round
3	(Japan) A Ohori	21	21
(Netherlands) G Mahulette	9	12
7	(Denmark) N K Rohde	21	22
(India) R Das	15	20

Quarterfinals
3	(Japan) A Ohori	21	21
7	(Denmark) N K Rohde	15	13

=== Bottom half ===
==== Section 3 ====
First round
(South Korea) Kim G-e	21	21
(Ukraine) N Voytsekh	15	16
(United States) J Subandhi	18	10
6	(Canada) M Li	21	21
(India) R Karthik	21	16	15
(Denmark) S H Dahl	12	21	21
PFR	(United States) D Gupta	10	10
4	(Bulgaria) L Zetchiri	21	21

Second round
(South Korea) Kim G-e	21	15	12
6	(Canada) M Li	19	21	21
(Denmark) S H Dahl	21	21
4	(Bulgaria) L Zetchiri	13	19

Quarterfinals
6	(Canada) M Li	21	21
(Denmark) S H Dahl	7	14

==== Section 4 ====
First round
(Japan) S Kawakami	4
(South Korea) Kim N-y	1^{r}
(Japan) S Takahashi	21	21
8	(Vietnam) Vu T T	8	8
(Japan) H Suzuki	21	21
(England) C Birch	13	11
(Scotland) K Gilmour	21	21
PFR	(Thailand) S Suwannakitborihan	7	12

Second round
(Japan) S Kawakami	21	21
(Japan) S Takahashi	18	14
(Japan) H Suzuki	17	22
(Scotland) K Gilmour	21	24

Quarterfinals
(Japan) S Kawakami	14	22
(Scotland) K Gilmour	21	24

== Men's doubles ==
=== Seeds ===
1. (Chinese Taipei) Lu Ching-yao / Yang Po-han (final)
2. (Japan) Takuto Inoue / Yuki Kaneko (champion)
3. (India) Manu Attri / B. Sumeeth Reddy (semifinals)
4. (India) Satwiksairaj Rankireddy / Chirag Shetty (first round)
5. (Australia) Matthew Chau / Sawan Serasinghe (first round)
6. (Sweden) Richard Eidestedt / Nico Ruponen (first round)
7. (Japan) Hiroki Okamura / Masayuki Onodera (quarterfinals)
8. (Republic of Ireland) Joshua Magee / Sam Magee (first round)

=== Finals ===
Semifinals
1	(Chinese Taipei) Lu Ching-yao (Chinese Taipei) Yang Po-han	21	12	22
3	(India) Manu Attri (India) B. Sumeeth Reddy	12	21	20
(South Korea) Choi Sol-gyu (South Korea) Kim Jae-hwan	22	19
2	(Japan) Takuto Inoue (Japan) Yuki Kaneko	24	21

Final
1	(Chinese Taipei) Lu Ching-yao (Chinese Taipei) Yang Po-han	21	13	13
2	(Japan) Takuto Inoue (Japan) Yuki Kaneko	15	21	21

=== Top half ===
==== Section 1 ====
First round
1	(Chinese Taipei) Lu C-y (Chinese Taipei) Yang P-h	21	21
(England) B Lane (England) S Vendy	13	16
(South Korea) Kim W-h (South Korea) Seo S-j	21	21
(Netherlands) J Arends (Netherlands) R Jille	19	15
6	(Sweden) R Eidestedt (Sweden) N Ruponen	21	19	18
(Scotland) M Campbell (Scotland) P Machugh	11	21	21
(Vietnam) Do T D (Vietnam) Pham H N	21	20	21
(United States) T Gunawan (United States) M Y Ong	18	22	18

Second round
1	(Chinese Taipei) Lu C-y (Chinese Taipei) Yang P-h	17	21	23
(South Korea) Kim W-h (South Korea) Seo S-j	21	8	21
(Scotland) M Campbell (Scotland) P Machugh	20	15
(Vietnam) Do T D (Vietnam) Pham H N	22	21

Quarterfinals
1	(Chinese Taipei) Lu C-y (Chinese Taipei) Yang P-h	21	21
(Vietnam) Do T D (Vietnam) Pham H N	13	18

==== Section 2 ====
First round
3	(India) M Attri (India) B. S Reddy	21	21
(Canada) Jason H-s (Canada) N Yakura	15	19
(Indonesia) H Tandjaya (Indonesia) A Yunanto	21	14	22
(Trinidad and Tobago) N Bonkowsky (United States) M Fogarty	18	21	20
7	(Japan) H Okamura (Japan) M Onodera	21	21
(Austria) D Stipsits (Austria) R Zirnwald	18	18
(India) A Francis (India) T Kona	21	21
(United States) Y T Chan (United States) B C Cheng	3	10

Second round
3	(India) M Attri (India) B. S Reddy	21	21
(Indonesia) H Tandjaya (Indonesia) A Yunanto	16	9
7	(Japan) H Okamura (Japan) M Onodera	21	9	21
(India) A Francis (India) T Kona	19	21	14

Quarterfinals
3	(India) M Attri (India) B. S Reddy	21	22
7	(Japan) H Okamura (Japan) M Onodera	18	20

=== Bottom half ===
==== Section 3 ====
First round
(United States) R Chew (United States) S Pongnairat	6	16
(Netherlands) J Maas (Netherlands) R Tabeling	21	21
(South Korea) Choi S-g (South Korea) Kim J-h	21	21
8	(Republic of Ireland) J Magee (Republic of Ireland) S Magee	11	14
(United States) P Chew (United States) C Lin	14	11
(England) P Briggs (England) T Wolfenden	21	21
(Japan) K Gondo (Japan) T Watanabe	8	21	21
4	(India) S Rankireddy (India) C Shetty	21	19	19

Second round
(Netherlands) J Maas (Netherlands) R Tabeling	21	13	12
(South Korea) Choi S-g (South Korea) Kim J-h	13	21	21
(England) P Briggs (England) T Wolfenden	13	13
(Japan) K Gondo (Japan) T Watanabe	21	21

Quarterfinals
(South Korea) Choi S-g (South Korea) Kim J-h	21	22
(Japan) K Gondo (Japan) T Watanabe	17	20

==== Section 4 ====
First round
(Mexico) L Munoz (Mexico) J Castillo	21	21
(United States) M Cohn (United States) D Schoppe	8	6
(Scotland) A Dunn (Scotland) A Hall	19	21	21
5	(Australia) M Chau (Australia) S Serasinghe	21	16	18
(United States) C B Kwan (United States) V Chiu	21	21	22
(Vietnam) Bao M (Vietnam) Duong B D	13	23	20
(Germany) D Benz (Germany) A Heinz	17	7
2	(Japan) T Inoue (Japan) Y Kaneko	21	21

Second round
(Mexico) L Munoz (Mexico) J Castillo	13	14
(Scotland) A Dunn (Scotland) A Hall	21	21
(United States) C B Kwan (United States) V Chiu	10	15
2	(Japan) T Inoue (Japan) Y Kaneko	21	21

Quarterfinals
(Scotland) A Dunn (Scotland) A Hall	12	17
2	(Japan) T Inoue (Japan) Y Kaneko	21	21

== Women's doubles ==
=== Seeds ===
1. (Bulgaria) Gabriela Stoeva / Stefani Stoeva (second round)
2. (Australia) Setyana Mapasa / Gronya Somerville (withdrew)
3. (Russia) Anastasia Chervyakova / Olga Morozova (second round)
4. (South Korea) Kim Hye-rin / Yoo Hae-won (quarterfinals)
5. (South Korea) Chae Yoo-jung / Kim So-yeong (semifinals)
6. (Netherlands) Eefje Muskens / Selena Piek (withdrew)
7. (Japan) Mayu Matsumoto / Wakana Nagahara (final)
8. (England) Lauren Smith / Sarah Walker (second round)

=== Finals ===
Semifinals
7	(Japan) Mayu Matsumoto (Japan) Wakana Nagahara	21	23
(Japan) Arisa Higashino (Japan) Kie Nakanishi	19	21
(South Korea) Lee So-hee (South Korea) Shin Seung-chan	28	21	22
5	(South Korea) Chae Yoo-jung (South Korea) Kim So-yeong	30	19	20

Final
7	(Japan) Mayu Matsumoto (Japan) Wakana Nagahara	16	13
(South Korea) Lee So-hee (South Korea) Shin Seung-chan	21	21

=== Top half ===
==== Section 1 ====
First round
1	(Bulgaria) G Stoeva (Bulgaria) S Stoeva	21	21
(France) E Lefel (France) A Tran	11	10
(Japan) M Aratama (Japan) A Watanabe	21	21
(United States) R Neumann (United States) I Zhong	4	3
7	(Japan) M Matsumoto (Japan) W Nagahara	21	21
PFR	(United States) C Chung (United States) N J Leung	5	6
(India) M Jakkampudi (India) P S Ram	21	14	21
(Japan) R Kawashima (Japan) S Ozaki	16	21	14

Second round
1	(Bulgaria) G Stoeva (Bulgaria) S Stoeva	18	21	19
(Japan) M Aratama (Japan) A Watanabe	21	13	21
7	(Japan) M Matsumoto (Japan) W Nagahara	21	21
(India) M Jakkampudi (India) P S Ram	18	9

Quarterfinals
(Japan) M Aratama (Japan) A Watanabe	17	9
7	(Japan) M Matsumoto (Japan) W Nagahara	21	21

==== Section 2 ====
First round
4	(South Korea) Kim H-r (South Korea) Yoo H-w	21	21
(Netherlands) C Seinen (Netherlands) I Van Der Aar	8	18
(Vietnam) Nguyen T S (Vietnam) Vu T T	22	21
(Switzerland) C Burkart (Netherlands) J Meulendijks	20	17
8	(England) L Smith (England) S Walker	21	21
(Scotland) J MacPherson (Scotland) E O'Donnell	16	16
(Japan) A Higashino (Japan) K Nakanishi	21	21
(United States) A Lee (United States) S Lee	4	4

Second round
4	(South Korea) Kim H-r (South Korea) Yoo H-w	21	21
(Vietnam) Nguyen T S (Vietnam) Vu T T	15	16
8	(England) L Smith (England) S Walker	12	18
(Japan) A Higashino (Japan) K Nakanishi	21	21

Quarterfinals
4	(South Korea) Kim H-r (South Korea) Yoo H-w	14	12
(Japan) A Higashino (Japan) K Nakanishi	21	21

=== Bottom half ===
==== Section 3 ====
First round
(South Korea) Lee S-h (South Korea) Shin S-c	21	21
(France) L Baumann (France) A Fontaine	3	11
(England) C Birch (England) J Pugh	16	19
PFR	(Canada) R Honderich (Canada) M Li	21	21
(Canada) M Tong (Canada) J Wu	15	6
(Japan) C Hoshi (Japan) N Shinoya	21	21
(India) K Garg (India) N B Hazarika	12	10
3	(Russia) A Chervyakova (Russia) O Morozova	21	21

Second round
(South Korea) Lee S-h (South Korea) Shin S-c	21	21
PFR	(Canada) R Honderich (Canada) M Li	9	14
(Japan) C Hoshi (Japan) N Shinoya	21	21
3	(Russia) A Chervyakova (Russia) O Morozova	11	12

Quarterfinals
(South Korea) Lee S-h (South Korea) Shin S-c	21	21
(Japan) C Hoshi (Japan) N Shinoya	18	16

==== Section 4 ====
First round
(Peru) D Macias (Peru) D Nishimura	14	5
(Japan) M Kashihara (Japan) M Kato	21	21
(Thailand) S Suwannakitborihan (Thailand) C Teachavorasinskun	11	18
5	(South Korea) Chae Y-j (South Korea) Kim S-y	21	21
(United States) A Xu (United States) K Xu	21	21
(Sweden) C Nistad (Sweden) E Wengberg	14	16
(United States) J Y Hong (United States) B Zhang	21	21
PFR	(United States) M Chen (United States) D Gupta	10	11

Second round
(Japan) M Kashihara (Japan) M Kato	12	18
5	(South Korea) Chae Y-j (South Korea) Kim S-y	21	21
(United States) A Xu (United States) K Xu	14	20
(United States) J Y Hong (United States) B Zhang	21	22

Quarterfinals
5	(South Korea) Chae Y-j (South Korea) Kim S-y	21	21
(United States) J Y Hong (United States) B Zhang	14	11

== Mixed doubles ==
=== Seeds ===
1. (Malaysia) Tan Kian Meng / Lai Pei Jing (quarterfinals)
2. (South Korea) Choi Sol-gyu / Chae Yoo-jung (quarterfinals)
3. (India) Pranaav Jerry Chopra / N. Sikki Reddy (first round)
4. (Malaysia) Goh Soon Huat / Shevon Jemie Lai (quarterfinals)
5. (Republic of Ireland) Sam Magee / Chloe Magee (first round)
6. (Sweden) Nico Ruponen / Amanda Hogstrom (second round)
7. (Netherlands) Jacco Arends / Selena Piek (first round)
8. (France) Ronan Labar / Audrey Fontaine (quarterfinals)

=== Finals ===
Semifinals
(South Korea) Kim Won-ho (South Korea) Shin Seung-chan	21	21
(England) Ben Lane (England) Jessica Pugh	14	13
(Japan) Kohei Gondo (Japan) Wakana Nagahara	13	13
(South Korea) Seo Seung-jae (South Korea) Kim Ha-na	21	21

Final
(South Korea) Kim Won-ho (South Korea) Shin Seung-chan	21	14	11
(South Korea) Seo Seung-jae (South Korea) Kim Ha-na	16	21	21

=== Top half ===
==== Section 1 ====
First round
1	(Malaysia) Tan K M (Malaysia) Lai P J	21	21
(Switzerland) O Schaller (Switzerland) C Burkart	16	7
(United States) M Fogarty (United States) I Zhong	8	12
(Scotland) A Dunn (Scotland) E O'Donnell	21	21
5	(Republic of Ireland) S Magee (Republic of Ireland) C Magee	16	16
(South Korea) Kim W-h (South Korea) Shin S-c	21	21
(Canada) T Ng (Canada) J Wu	18	11
(Australia) S Serasinghe (Australia) S Mapasa	21	21

Second round
1	(Malaysia) Tan K M (Malaysia) Lai P J	21	21
(Scotland) A Dunn (Scotland) E O'Donnell	12	18
(South Korea) Kim W-h (South Korea) Shin S-c	21	21
(Australia) S Serasinghe (Australia) S Mapasa	9	15

Quarterfinals
1	(Malaysia) Tan K M (Malaysia) Lai P J	21	18	18
(South Korea) Kim W-h (South Korea) Shin S-c	15	21	21

==== Section 2 ====
First round
3	(India) P J Chopra (India) N. S Reddy	21	19	17
(England) B Lane (England) J Pugh	19	21	21
(United States) P Jap (United States) J Hsu	22	19	21
(Vietnam) Pham H N (Vietnam) Le T H	20	21	16
8	(France) R Labar (France) A Fontaine	21	16	21
(South Korea) Kim J-h (South Korea) Lee S-h	9	21	12
(Netherlands) R Tabeling (Netherlands) C Seinen	21	18	21
(United States) T Gunawan (United States) J Subandhi	13	21	11

Second round
(England) B Lane (England) J Pugh	21	21
(United States) P Jap (United States) J Hsu	15	13
8	(France) R Labar (France) A Fontaine	21	18	21
(Netherlands) R Tabeling (Netherlands) C Seinen	15	21	18

Quarterfinals
(England) B Lane (England) J Pugh	20	21	21
8	(France) R Labar (France) A Fontaine	22	16	9

=== Bottom half ===
==== Section 3 ====
First round
(France) J Corvee (France) A Tran	20	21	15
(Japan) K Gondo (Japan) W Nagahara	22	19	21
(Germany) A Heinz (Germany) A Horbach	9	14
6	(Sweden) N Ruponen (Sweden) A Hogstrom	21	21
(Canada) N Yakura (Canada) B Tam	13	15
(India) M Attri (India) K. Maneesha	21	21
(Croatia) Z Durkinjak (United States) J Y Hong	18	15
4	(Malaysia) Goh S H (Malaysia) S J Lai	21	21

Second round
(Japan) K Gondo (Japan) W Nagahara	21	21
6	(Sweden) N Ruponen (Sweden) A Hogstrom	17	19
(India) M Attri (India) K. Maneesha	16	12
4	(Malaysia) Goh S H (Malaysia) S J Lai	21	21

Quarterfinals
(Japan) K Gondo (Japan) W Nagahara	21	8	22
4	(Malaysia) Goh S H (Malaysia) S J Lai	11	21	20

==== Section 4 ====
First round
(Netherlands) J Maas (Netherlands) I Van Der Aar	w	/	o
(Australia) M Chau (Australia) T Ho
(South Korea) Seo S-j (South Korea) Kim H-n	21	21
7	(Netherlands) J Arends (Netherlands) S Piek	17	14
(India) T Kona (India) M Jakkampudi	15	17
(Vietnam) Do T D (Vietnam) Pham N T	21	21
(United States) Y T Chan (United States) Y Kawasaki	7	6
2	(South Korea) Choi S-g (South Korea) Chae Y-j	21	21

Second round
(Netherlands) J Maas (Netherlands) I Van Der Aar	17	16
(South Korea) Seo S-j (South Korea) Kim H-n	21	21
(Vietnam) Do T D (Vietnam) Pham N T	18	18
2	(South Korea) Choi S-g (South Korea) Chae Y-j	21	21

Quarterfinals
(South Korea) Seo S-j (South Korea) Kim H-n	21	16	21
2	(South Korea) Choi S-g (South Korea) Chae Y-j	12	21	11

Preceded by 2017 Russia Open Grand Prix	BWF Grand Prix Gold and Grand Prix; 2017 BWF Season	Succeeded by 2017 New Zealand Open Grand Prix Gold
