= 2018 Australian Open (badminton) =

2018 badminton tournament in Sydney

Tournament details
- Dates: 8–13 May
- Level: Super 300
- Total prize money: US$150,000
- Venue: Quaycentre
- Location: Sydney, Australia

Champions
- Men's singles: (China) Lu Guangzu
- Women's singles: (China) Cai Yanyan
- Men's doubles: (Indonesia) Berry Angriawan (Indonesia) Hardianto
- Women's doubles: (Japan) Ayako Sakuramoto (Japan) Yukiko Takahata
- Mixed doubles: (South Korea) Seo Seung-jae (South Korea) Chae Yoo-jung

The 2018 Australian Open (officially known as the Crown Group Australian Open 2018 for sponsorship reasons) was a badminton tournament that took place at Quaycentre in Australia from 8 to 13 May 2018. The purse totalled $150,000.

== Tournament ==
The 2018 Australian Open was the ninth tournament of the 2018 BWF World Tour and also part of the Australian Open championships, which had been held since 1975. This tournament was organized by Badminton Australia and sanctioned by the BWF.

=== Venue ===
This international tournament was held at Quaycentre in Sydney, Australia.

=== Point distribution ===
Below is the point distribution for each phase of the tournament based on the BWF points system for the BWF World Tour Super 300 event.

| Winner | Runner-up | 3/4 | 5/8 | 9/16 | 17/32 | 33/64 | 65/128 |
|---|---|---|---|---|---|---|---|
| 7,000 | 5,950 | 4,900 | 3,850 | 2,750 | 1,670 | 660 | 320 |

=== Prize money ===
The total prize money for this tournament was US$150,000. Distribution of prize money was in accordance with BWF regulations.

| Event | Winner | Finals | Semi-finals | Quarter-finals | Last 16 |
| Singles | $11,250 | $5,700 | $2,175 | $900 | $525 |
| Doubles | $11,850 | $5,700 | $2,100 | $1,087.50 | $562.50 |

== Men's singles ==
=== Seeds ===
1. (India) Prannoy Kumar (withdrew)
2. (India) B. Sai Praneeth (quarter-finals)
3. (Thailand) Tanongsak Saensomboonsuk (withdrew)
4. (India) Sameer Verma (quarter-finals)
5. (Indonesia) Tommy Sugiarto (quarter-finals)
6. (India) Parupalli Kashyap (withdrew)
7. (Hong Kong) Lee Cheuk Yiu (semi-finals)
8. (Malaysia) Liew Daren (first round)

=== Wild card ===
Badminton Australia awarded a wild card entry to Anthony Joe of Australia.

=== Finals ===
Semi-finals
(China) Zhao Junpeng | 21 | 19 | 15
Q4 | (China) Lu Guangzu | 12 | 21 | 21
PFQ | (China) Zhou Zeqi | 21 | 21
7 | (Hong Kong) Lee Cheuk Yiu | 14 | 15

Final
Q4 | (China) Lu Guangzu | 21 | 23
PFQ | (China) Zhou Zeqi | 8 | 21

=== Top half ===
==== Section 1 ====
First round
PFQ | (Malaysia) Chong Y H | 21 | 21
WC | (Australia) A Joe | 18 | 15
(India) K R Rajarajan | 15 | 8
(Indonesia) S D Kuncoro | 21 | 21
8 | (Malaysia) Liew D | 15 | 18
Q3 | (China) Sun FX | 21 | 21
(China) Zhao JP | 21 | 21
(Czech Republic) A Mendrek | 14 | 14

Second round
PFQ | (Malaysia) Chong Y H | 21 | 17 | 18
(Indonesia) S D Kuncoro | 8 | 21 | 21
Q3 | (China) Sun FX | 21 | 10 | 11
(China) Zhao JP | 16 | 21 | 21

Quarter-finals
(Indonesia) S D Kuncoro | 8 | 21 | 17
(China) Zhao JP | 21 | 16 | 21

==== Section 2 ====
First round
4 | (India) S Verma | 13 | 21 | 21
PFQ | (New Zealand) A Manota | 21 | 9 | 7
(Japan) T Ueda | 19 | 21 | 21
(India) S Verma | 21 | 17 | 12
PFQ | (South Korea) Heo K-h | 9 | 21 | 18
Q4 | (China) Lu GZ | 21 | 16 | 21
(Malaysia) Chong W F | 21 | 19 | 21
(Japan) K Watanabe | 10 | 21 | 11

Second round
4 | (India) S Verma | 21 | 21
(Japan) T Ueda | 16 | 12
Q4 | (China) Lu GZ | 21 | 21
(Malaysia) Chong W F | 15 | 11

Quarter-finals
4 | (India) S Verma | 14 | 6
Q4 | (China) Lu GZ | 21 | 21

=== Bottom half ===
==== Section 3 ====
First round
PFQ | (China) Ren PB | 21 | 18 | 11
(Japan) Y Igarashi | 19 | 21 | 21
(Czech Republic) M Ludík | 10 | 11
5 | (Indonesia) T Sugiarto | 21 | 21
(India) A Jayaram | 22 | 20 | 17
Q1 | (Japan) R Takeshita | 20 | 22 | 21
PFQ | (Sri Lanka) N Karunaratne | 17 | 20
PFQ | (China) Zhou ZQ | 21 | 22

Second round
(Japan) Y Igarashi | 12 | 9
5 | (Indonesia) T Sugiarto | 21 | 21
Q1 | (Japan) R Takeshita | 8 | 14
PFQ | (China) Zhou ZQ | 21 | 21

Quarter-finals
5 | (Indonesia) T Sugiarto | 12 | 15
PFQ | (China) Zhou ZQ | 21 | 21

==== Section 4 ====
First round
(Malaysia) Cheam J W | 21 | 21
Q2 | (Indonesia) Y F Mainaky | 13 | 5
(India) L Sen | 20 | 21 | 19
7 | (Hong Kong) Lee C Y | 22 | 13 | 21
(India) R Y Chittaboina | 11 | 17
(Indonesia) P A Maulana | 21 | 21
(Israel) M Zilberman | 17 | 14
2 | (India) B. S Praneeth | 21 | 21

Second round
(Malaysia) Cheam J W | 17 | 21 | 20
7 | (Hong Kong) Lee C Y | 21 | 12 | 22
(Indonesia) P A Maulana | 12 | 14
2 | (India) B. S Praneeth | 21 | 21

Quarter-finals
7 | (Hong Kong) Lee C Y | 23 | 21
2 | (India) B. S Praneeth | 21 | 13

== Women's singles ==
=== Seeds ===
1. (India) Saina Nehwal (withdrew)
2. (Canada) Michelle Li (first round)
3. (Hong Kong) Cheung Ngan Yi (semi-finals)
4. (Japan) Minatsu Mitani (semi-finals)
5. (Turkey) Neslihan Yiğit (withdrew)
6. (Japan) Natsuki Nidaira (withdrew)
7. (Canada) Brittney Tam (first round)
8. (Japan) Shiori Saito (first round)

=== Finals ===
Semi-finals
(China) Cai Yanyan | 21 | 21
3 | (Hong Kong) Cheung Ngan Yi | 19 | 11
4 | (Japan) Minatsu Mitani | 17 | 17
Q2 | (Japan) Ayumi Mine | 21 | 21

Final
(China) Cai Yanyan | 21 | 21
Q2 | (Japan) Ayumi Mine | 14 | 13

=== Top half ===
==== Section 1 ====
First round
PFQ | (Thailand) M Hemrachatanun | 18 | 11
(Australia) L Ma | 21 | 21
Q4 | (Australia) Y Jiang | 13 | 17
PFQ | (China) Ji ST | 21 | 21
PFQ | (United States) C Pan | 14 | 12
(China) Cai YY | 21 | 21
(Thailand) P Chaiwan | 20 | 21 | 16
(China) Zhang YM | 22 | 17 | 21

Second round
(Australia) L Ma | 9 | 15
PFQ | (China) Ji ST | 21 | 21
(China) Cai YY | 21 | 21
(China) Zhang YM | 10 | 12

Quarter-finals
PFQ | (China) Ji ST | 15 | 13
(China) Cai YY | 21 | 21

==== Section 2 ====
First round
3 | (Hong Kong) Cheung N Y | 21 | 21
(Australia) J Tam | 5 | 12
(Switzerland) S Jaquet | 21 | 13 | 21
Q1 | (South Korea) Kim G-e | 16 | 21 | 14
7 | (Canada) B Tam | 24 | 11 | 12
Q3 | (Japan) Y Nakai | 22 | 21 | 21
(United States) D Gupta | 11 | 14
(Indonesia) L A Mainaky | 21 | 21

Second round
3 | (Hong Kong) Cheung N Y | 21 | 21
(Switzerland) S Jaquet | 9 | 5
Q3 | (Japan) Y Nakai | 19 | 21 | 21
(Indonesia) L A Mainaky | 21 | 8 | 6

Quarter-finals
3 | (Hong Kong) Cheung N Y | 11 | 21 | 21
Q3 | (Japan) Y Nakai | 21 | 14 | 15

=== Bottom half ===
==== Section 3 ====
First round
(India) S K P Kudaravalli | 18 | 20
(Indonesia) Y Y Susanto | 21 | 22
(Indonesia) J Muljati | 21 | 21
PFQ | (United States) I Zhong | 17 | 14
(Thailand) C Jucharoen | 9 | 15
(South Korea) Jeon J-i | 21 | 21
(Israel) K Polikarpova | 10 | 13
4 | (Japan) M Mitani | 21 | 21

Second round
(Indonesia) Y Y Susanto | 21 | 21
(Indonesia) J Muljati | 13 | 14
(South Korea) Jeon J-i | 12 | 12
4 | (Japan) M Mitani | 21 | 21

Quarter-finals
(Indonesia) Y Y Susanto | 14 | 13
4 | (Japan) M Mitani | 21 | 21

==== Section 4 ====
First round
Q2 | (Japan) A Mine | 21 | 21
(India) S U R Chukka | 8 | 19
(Australia) Chen H-y | 8 | 21 | 22
8 | (Japan) S Saito | 21 | 15 | 20
(England) G Bland | 21 | 15 | 15
(India) V R Jakka | 19 | 21 | 21
(China) Han Y | 21 | 21
2 | (Canada) M Li | 11 | 11

Second round
Q2 | (Japan) A Mine | 21 | 21
(Australia) Chen H-y | 6 | 9
(India) V R Jakka | 5 | 5
(China) Han Y | 21 | 21

Quarter-finals
Q2 | (Japan) A Mine | 21 | 21
(China) Han Y | 15 | 13

== Men's doubles ==
=== Seeds ===
1. (Indonesia) Berry Angriawan / Hardianto (champions)
2. (Indonesia) Wahyu Nayaka / Ade Yusuf (final)
3. (India) Manu Attri / B. Sumeeth Reddy (semi-finals)
4. (China) He Jiting / Tan Qiang (first round)
5. (Malaysia) Aaron Chia / Soh Wooi Yik (withdrew)
6. (Malaysia) Tan Boon Heong / (South Korea) Yoo Yeon-seong (first round)
7. (India) Arjun M.R. / Ramchandran Shlok (quarter-finals)
8. (India) Alwin Francis / Nandagopal Kidambi (first round)

=== Finals ===
Semi-finals

Final

1
- (Indonesia) Berry Angriawan
- (Indonesia) Hardianto
21
21

3
- (India) Manu Attri
- (India) B. Sumeeth Reddy
17
15

1
- (Indonesia) Berry Angriawan
- (Indonesia) Hardianto
21
9
21

2
- (Indonesia) Wahyu Nayaka
- (Indonesia) Ade Yusuf
9
21
15

- (Japan) Keiichiro Matsui
- (Japan) Yoshinori Takeuchi
17
11

2
- (Indonesia) Wahyu Nayaka
- (Indonesia) Ade Yusuf
21
21

=== Top half ===
==== Section 1 ====
First round

Second round

Quarter-finals

1
- (Indonesia) B Angriawan
- (Indonesia) Hardianto
21
21

- (United States) P Chew
- (United States) R Chew
9
15

1
- (Indonesia) B Angriawan
- (Indonesia) Hardianto
21
21

- (Thailand) P Kuna-Anuvit
- (Thailand) N Trinkajee
17
17

- (Thailand) P Kuna-Anuvit
- (Thailand) N Trinkajee
21
21

- (Australia) C Chen
- (Australia) T Wong
7
15

1
- (Indonesia) B Angriawan
- (Indonesia) Hardianto
21
21

- (Japan) M Takano
- (Japan) Y Tsukamoto
10
18

8
- (India) A Francis
- (India) N Kidambi
30
7^{r}

- (South Korea) Jung T-i
- (South Korea) Kim H-t
28
8

- (South Korea) Jung T-i
- (South Korea) Kim H-t
21
19
23

- (Japan) M Takano
- (Japan) Y Tsukamoto
18
21
25

- (Japan) M Takano
- (Japan) Y Tsukamoto
21
21

Q2
- (Chinese Taipei) Kan C-y
- (Chinese Taipei) Liao C-h
17
19

==== Section 2 ====
First round

Second round

Quarter-finals

3
- (India) M Attri
- (India) B. S Reddy
21
21

PFQ
- (Australia) L Defolky
- (Australia) M Fariman
11
10

3
- (India) M Attri
- (India) B. S Reddy
21
21

- (South Korea) Choi H-g
- (South Korea) Park K-h
17
17

- (South Korea) Choi H-g
- (South Korea) Park K-h
21
21

- (Australia) S Leung
- (Australia) M Wheller
13
13

3
- (India) M Attri
- (India) B. S Reddy
17
21
21

7
- (India) Arjun M.R.
- (India) R Shlok
21
19
18

7
- (India) Arjun M.R.
- (India) R Shlok
21
21

- (Australia) R Tam
- (Australia) E Vuong
7
15

7
- (India) Arjun M.R.
- (India) R Shlok
21
25

- (Japan) H Okamura
- (Japan) M Onodera
15
23

- (Japan) H Okamura
- (Japan) M Onodera
21
12
21

- (China) Chai B
- (China) Wang ZK
19
21
17

=== Bottom half ===
==== Section 3 ====
First round

Second round

Quarter-finals

- (Indonesia) A B Cahyono
- (Indonesia) M R P Isfahani
18
13

- (Japan) K Matsui
- (Japan) Y Takeuchi
21
21

- (Japan) K Matsui
- (Japan) Y Takeuchi
21
22
21

PFQ
- (Malaysia) Chen T J
- (Malaysia) Goh S H
16
24
15

- (India) R Kapoor
- (India) S Sharma
15
21
7

PFQ
- (Malaysia) Chen T J
- (Malaysia) Goh S H
21
15
21

- (Japan) K Matsui
- (Japan) Y Takeuchi
19
21
22

- (South Korea) Kang M-h
- (South Korea) Kim W-h
21
14
20

- (South Korea) Kang M-h
- (South Korea) Kim W-h
21
21

Q1
- (Australia) A Joe
- (Australia) P S Low
8
5

- (South Korea) Kang M-h
- (South Korea) Kim W-h
17
21
26

PFQ
- (China) Ou XY
- (China) Ren XY
21
18
24

PFQ
- (China) Ou XY
- (China) Ren XY
21
21

4
- (China) He JT
- (China) Tan Q
16
18

==== Section 4 ====
First round

Second round

Quarter-finals

- (Vietnam) Đỗ T Đ
- (Vietnam) Phạm H N
14
11

Q3
- (South Korea) Choi S-g
- (South Korea) Seo S-j
21
21

Q3
- (South Korea) Choi S-g
- (South Korea) Seo S-j
23
21

- (Indonesia) S K Gutama
- (Indonesia) F W Putra
21
19

- (Indonesia) S K Gutama
- (Indonesia) F W Putra
21
20
21

6
- (Malaysia) Tan B H
- (South Korea) Yoo Y-s
19
22
18

Q3
- (South Korea) Choi S-g
- (South Korea) Seo S-j
19
21
21

2
- (Indonesia) W Nayaka
- (Indonesia) A Yusuf
21
14
23

- (Australia) J Sun
- (Australia) Y Zhang
25
21

Q4
- (Australia) S Aroliveettil
- (Australia) Trần P N
23
12

- (Australia) J Sun
- (Australia) Y Zhang
14
5

2
- (Indonesia) W Nayaka
- (Indonesia) A Yusuf
21
21

(Thailand) I Apisuk
(Thailand) T Viriyangkura
25
16
13

2
- (Indonesia) W Nayaka
- (Indonesia) A Yusuf
23
21
21

== Women's doubles ==
=== Seeds ===
1. (Japan) Misato Aratama / Akane Watanabe (semi-finals)
2. (Japan) Ayako Sakuramoto / Yukiko Takahata (champions)
3. (China) Du Yue / Li Yinhui (second round)
4. (South Korea) Baek Ha-na / Lee Yu-rim (final)

=== Finals ===
Semi-finals

Final

1
- (Japan) Misato Aratama
- (Japan) Akane Watanabe
16
17

4
- (South Korea) Baek Ha-na
- (South Korea) Lee Yu-rim
21
21

4
- (South Korea) Baek Ha-na
- (South Korea) Lee Yu-rim
21
18

2
- (Japan) Ayako Sakuramoto
- (Japan) Yukiko Takahata
23
21

- (South Korea) Chae Yoo-jung
- (South Korea) Kim Hye-jeong
18
16

2
- (Japan) Ayako Sakuramoto
- (Japan) Yukiko Takahata
21
21

=== Top half ===
==== Section 1 ====
First round

Second round

Quarter-finals

1
- (Japan) M Aratama
- (Japan) A Watanabe
21
21

- (Indonesia) A S Awanda
- (Indonesia) M C Sahputri
13
16

- (Indonesia) A S Awanda
- (Indonesia) M C Sahputri
21
21

- (Japan) Y Nakai
- (Japan) N Ono
19
14

1
- (Japan) M Aratama
- (Japan) A Watanabe
21
21

- (Indonesia) Y Barkah
- (Indonesia) R E Putri Sari
15
13

- (Australia) L Y Khoo
- (Australia) A-L Slee
9
16

- (Indonesia) Y Barkah
- (Indonesia) R E Putri Sari
21
21

- (Indonesia) Y Barkah
- (Indonesia) R E Putri Sari
21
21

- (Thailand) R Laisuan
- (Thailand) S Mingchua
16
17

==== Section 2 ====
First round

Second round

Quarter-finals

4
- (South Korea) Baek H-n
- (South Korea) Lee Y-r
21
21

- (United States) E Kan
- (United States) I Zhong
10
5

- (Australia) M Tam
- (Australia) Y Zhang
9
19

- (United States) E Kan
- (United States) I Zhong
21
21

4
- (South Korea) Baek H-n
- (South Korea) Lee Y-r
21
14
21

- (South Korea) Kim H-r
- (South Korea) Kong H-y
14
21
11

- (Australia) J Tam
- (Australia) K Xu
3
6

- (South Korea) Kim H-r
- (South Korea) Kong H-y
21
21

- (South Korea) Kim H-r
- (South Korea) Kong H-y
21
21

- (Australia) Jiang YZ
- (Australia) L Ma
10
18

=== Bottom half ===
==== Section 3 ====
First round

Second round

Quarter-finals

- (Australia) M Chan
- (Australia) J Vega
10
16

- (India) M Jakkampudi
- (India) P S Ram
21
21

- (India) M Jakkampudi
- (India) P S Ram
11
13

- (Japan) M Kashihara
- (Japan) M Kato
21
21

- (Japan) M Kashihara
- (Japan) M Kato
21
21

- (Thailand) S Paewsampran
- (Thailand) P Supajirakul
14
9

- (Japan) M Kashihara
- (Japan) M Kato
17
12

- (South Korea) Chae Y-j
- (South Korea) Kim H-j
21
21

- (Australia) Chen H-y
- (Australia) S Kurniawan
11
9

- (South Korea) Chae Y-j
- (South Korea) Kim H-j
21
21

- (South Korea) Chae Y-j
- (South Korea) Kim H-j
22
21

3
- (China) Du Y
- (China) Li YH
20
16

==== Section 4 ====
First round

Second round

Quarter-finals

- (New Zealand) A Pak
- (New Zealand) F A Rahardja
w
/
o

- (Japan) N Matsuyama
- (Japan) C Shida

- (New Zealand) A Pak
- (New Zealand) F A Rahardja
w
/
o

- (China) Huang DP
- (China) Li WM

- (New Zealand) A Pak
- (New Zealand) F A Rahardja
13
13

2
- (Japan) A Sakuramoto
- (Japan) Y Takahata
21
21

- (China) Cao TW
- (China) Zheng Y

- (New Zealand) S Fu
- (New Zealand) A Tagle
w
/
o

- (New Zealand) S Fu
- (New Zealand) A Tagle
2
6

2
- (Japan) A Sakuramoto
- (Japan) Y Takahata
21
21

== Mixed doubles ==
=== Seeds ===
1. (Malaysia) Goh Soon Huat / Shevon Jemie Lai (quarter-finals)
2. (China) He Jiting / Du Yue (quarter-finals)
3. (India) Pranav Chopra / N. Sikki Reddy (withdrew)
4. (Indonesia) Hafiz Faizal / Gloria Emanuelle Widjaja (second round)
5. (South Korea) Choi Sol-gyu / Kim Ha-na (semi-finals)
5. (South Korea) Seo Seung-jae / Chae Yoo-jung (champions)
7. (Malaysia) Chan Peng Soon / Goh Liu Ying (final)
8. (China) Wang Zekang / Li Yinhui (semi-finals)

=== Finals ===
Semi-finals

Final

8
- (China) Wang Zekang
- (China) Li Yinhui
16
23

7
- (Malaysia) Chan Peng Soon
- (Malaysia) Goh Liu Ying
21
25

7
- (Malaysia) Chan Peng Soon
- (Malaysia) Goh Liu Ying
12
21

5
- (South Korea) Seo Seung-jae
- (South Korea) Chae Yoo-jung
21
23

5
- (South Korea) Seo Seung-jae
- (South Korea) Chae Yoo-jung
21
21

5
- (South Korea) Choi Sol-gyu
- (South Korea) Kim Ha-na
16
12

=== Top half ===
==== Section 1 ====
First round

Second round

Quarter-finals

1
- (Malaysia) Goh S H
- (Malaysia) S J Lai
21
21

- (New Zealand) N Tagle
- (Canada) B Tam
13
10

1
- (Malaysia) Goh S H
- (Malaysia) S J Lai
21
21

- (Malaysia) Chen T J
- (Malaysia) Peck Y W
10
18

Q3
- (South Korea) Kang M-h
- (South Korea) Baek H-n
21
23
15

- (Malaysia) Chen T J
- (Malaysia) Peck Y W
23
21
21

1
- (Malaysia) Goh S H
- (Malaysia) S J Lai
17
13

8
- (China) Wang ZK
- (China) Li YH
21
21

8
- (China) Wang ZK
- (China) Li YH
21
21

- (Thailand) P Kuna-Anuvit
- (Thailand) S Paewsampran
18
14

8
- (China) Wang ZK
- (China) Li YH
13
21
22

Q4
- (South Korea) Park K-h
- (South Korea) Kong H-y
21
17
20

- (Thailand) S Jomkoh
- (Thailand) P Supajirakul
21
14
12

Q4
- (South Korea) Park K-h
- (South Korea) Kong H-y
16
21
21

==== Section 2 ====
First round

Second round

Quarter-finals

PFQ
- (Australia) J Sun
- (Australia) J Tam
11
12

- (Indonesia) Y E Saputra
- (Indonesia) M G Islami
21
21

- (Indonesia) Y E Saputra
- (Indonesia) M G Islami
21
21

- (Israel) M Zilberman
- (Israel) K Polikarpova
15
12

Q1
- (Singapore) J Tan D J
- (Australia) Y Zhang
19
14

- (Israel) M Zilberman
- (Israel) K Polikarpova
21
21

- (Indonesia) Y E Saputra
- (Indonesia) M G Islami
3
10

7
- (Malaysia) Chan P S
- (Malaysia) Goh L Y
21
21

7
- (Malaysia) Chan P S
- (Malaysia) Goh L Y
21
21

- (New Zealand) M Philips
- (New Zealand) A Pak
18
12

7
- (Malaysia) Chan P S
- (Malaysia) Goh L Y
21
21

- (Indonesia) R K Suwardi
- (Indonesia) D Susanto
17
17

- (China) Ou XY
- (China) Cao TW
21
14
11

- (Indonesia) R K Suwardi
- (Indonesia) D Susanto
13
21
21

=== Bottom half ===
==== Section 3 ====
First round

Second round

Quarter-finals

- (India) S Sharma
- (India) P S Ram
21
21

- (Indonesia) Y F Mainaky
- (Indonesia) L A Mainaky
13
10

- (India) S Sharma
- (India) P S Ram
6
13

5
- (South Korea) Seo S-j
- (South Korea) Chae Y-j
21
21

Q2
- (Australia) L Defolky
- (Australia) S Kurniawan
6
13

5
- (South Korea) Seo S-j
- (South Korea) Chae Y-j
21
21

5
- (South Korea) Seo S-j
- (South Korea) Chae Y-j
21
21

- (South Korea) Kim W-h
- (South Korea) Lee Y-r
11
16

- (India) R Kapoor
- (India) K Garg
10
11

- (South Korea) Kim W-h
- (South Korea) Lee Y-r
21
21

- (South Korea) Kim W-h
- (South Korea) Lee Y-r
21
21

4
- (Indonesia) H Faizal
- (Indonesia) G E Widjaja
18
17

- (New Zealand) A Manota
- (New Zealand) J Villegas
5
15

4
- (Indonesia) H Faizal
- (Indonesia) G E Widjaja
21
21

==== Section 4 ====
First round

Second round

Quarter-finals

- (Australia) S Leung
- (Australia) L Ma
21
21

- (United States) M Fogarty
- (United States) I Zhong
12
10

- (Australia) S W H Leung
- (Australia) L Ma
11
11

5
- (South Korea) Choi S-g
- (South Korea) Kim H-n
21
21

- (Indonesia) R Alexander
- (Indonesia) A Saufika
21
17
18

5
- (South Korea) Choi S-g
- (South Korea) Kim H-n
16
21
21

5
- (South Korea) Choi S-g
- (South Korea) Kim H-n
16
24
21

2
- (China) He JT
- (China) Du Y
21
22
13

- (South Korea) Kim H-t
- (South Korea) Kim H-j
21
21

- (Australia) S Aroliveettil
- (Australia) M Chan
9
10

- (South Korea) Kim H-t
- (South Korea) Kim H-j
7
15

2
- (China) He JT
- (China) Du Y
21
21

- (Vietnam) Đỗ T Đ
- (Vietnam) Phạm N T
6
15

2
- (China) He JT
- (China) Du Y
21
21

| Preceded by 2017 Australian Super Series | Australian Open | Succeeded by 2019 Australian Open |
| Preceded by 2018 New Zealand Open | BWF World Tour; 2018 BWF season | Succeeded by 2018 U.S. Open |
