= 2018 U.S. Open (badminton) =

2018 badminton tournament in Fullerton, California

Tournament details
- Dates: 12–17 June
- Level: Super 300
- Total prize money: US$150,000
- Venue: Titan Gym
- Location: Fullerton, California, United States

Champions
- Men's singles: (South Korea) Lee Dong-keun
- Women's singles: (China) Li Xuerui
- Men's doubles: (China) Ou Xuanyi (China) Ren Xiangyu
- Women's doubles: (China) Tang Jinhua (China) Yu Xiaohan
- Mixed doubles: (Malaysia) Chan Peng Soon (Malaysia) Goh Liu Ying

The 2018 U.S. Open (officially known as the Yonex US Open 2018 for sponsorship reasons) was a badminton tournament which took place at Titan Gym in Fullerton, California, United States, from 12 to 17 June 2018 and had a total prize of $150,000.

== Tournament ==
The 2018 U.S. Open was the tenth tournament of the 2018 BWF World Tour and also part of the U.S. Open championships, which had been held since 1954. This tournament was organized by USA Badminton and sanctioned by the BWF.

=== Venue ===
This international tournament was held at Titan Gym on the campus of California State University, Fullerton in Fullerton, California, United States.

=== Point distribution ===
Below is the point distribution for each phase of the tournament based on the BWF points system for the BWF World Tour Super 300 event.

Winner	Runner-up	3/4	5/8	9/16	17/32	33/64	65/128
7,000	5,950	4,900	3,850	2,750	1,670	660	320

=== Prize money ===
The total prize money for this tournament was US$150,000. Distribution of prize money was in accordance with BWF regulations.

Event	Winner	Finals	Semi-finals	Quarter-finals	Last 16
Singles	$11,250	$5,700	$2,175	$900	$525
Doubles	$11,850	$5,700	$2,100	$1,087.50	$562.50

== Men's singles ==
=== Seeds ===
1. (China) Lin Dan (first round)
2. (India) Sameer Verma (withdrew)
3. (France) Brice Leverdez (second round)
4. (Thailand) Khosit Phetpradab (semi-finals)
5. (Thailand) Suppanyu Avihingsanon (second round)
6. (Netherlands) Mark Caljouw (final)
7. (Thailand) Kantaphon Wangcharoen (quarter-finals)
8. (Brazil) Ygor Coelho de Oliveira (second round)

=== Finals ===
Semi-finals
(South Korea) Lee Dong-keun	21	15	21
4	(Thailand) Khosit Phetpradab	19	21	18
(India) Ajay Jayaram	13	21
6	(Netherlands) Mark Caljouw	21	23

Final
(South Korea) Lee Dong-keun	14	21	21
6	(Netherlands) Mark Caljouw	21	17	16

=== Top half ===
==== Section 1 ====
First Round
1	(China) Lin D	13	12^{r}
(South Korea) Lee D-k	21	19
(Denmark) K Bruun	21	13	15
(Israel) M Zilberman	13	21	21
7	(Thailand) K Wangcharoen	21	21
(France) T Rouxel	15	16
(China) Zhao JP	21	21
(Germany) A Roovers	18	10

Second Round
(South Korea) Lee D-k	21	21
(Israel) M Zilberman	16	17
7	(Thailand) K Wangcharoen	21	21
(China) Zhao JP	11	15

Quarter-finals
(South Korea) Lee D-k	21	21
7	(Thailand) K Wangcharoen	18	18

==== Section 2 ====
First Round
4	(Thailand) K Phetpradab	21	21
PFQ	(Sweden) J Nilsson	17	17
(Vietnam) Phạm C C	13	19
(Canada) J Ho-shue	21	21
5	(Thailand) S Avihingsanon	21	15	21
(China) Huang YX	16	21	11
Q3	(China) Lu GZ	12	21	21
(Vietnam) Nguyễn T M	21	18	11

Second Round
4	(Thailand) K Phetpradab	21	21
(Canada) J Ho-shue	14	14
5	(Thailand) S Avihingsanon	21	20	17
Q3	(China) Lu GZ	18	22	21

Quarter-finals
4	(Thailand) K Phetpradab	21	12	21
Q3	(China) Lu GZ	16	21	16

=== Bottom half ===
==== Section 3 ====
First Round
(India) A Jayaram	26	17	21
Q4	(South Korea) Lee Y-k	24	21	13
Q1	(United States) H Shu	15	16
8	(Brazil) Y Coelho de Oliveira	21	21
(England) T Penty	21	19	18
(South Korea) Heo K-h	19	21	21
(Denmark) J Ø. Jørgensen	16	16
3	(France) B Leverdez	21	21

Second Round
(India) A Jayaram	19	21	21
8	(Brazil) Y Coelho de Oliveira	21	12	16
(South Korea) Heo K-h	23	21
3	(France) B Leverdez	21	12

Quarter-finals
(India) A Jayaram	21	21
(South Korea) Heo K-h	18	12

==== Section 4 ====
First Round
(Finland) K Koljonen	21	21
(Italy) R Maddaloni	14	12
(Thailand) S Thammasin	19	16
6	(Netherlands) M Caljouw	21	21
Q2	(Canada) Sheng XD	18	21	21
(Germany) K Schäfer	21	19	14
(Croatia) Z Đurkinjak	21	16
PFQ	(Germany) F Roth	17	10^{r}

Second Round
(Finland) K Koljonen	22	15	14
6	(Netherlands) M Caljouw	20	21	21
Q2	(Canada) Sheng XD	21	21
(Croatia) Z Đurkinjak	19	13

Quarter-finals
6	(Netherlands) M Caljouw	21	21
Q2	(Canada) Sheng XD	6	10

== Women's singles ==
=== Seeds ===
1. (United States) Zhang Beiwen (final)
2. (Japan) Sayaka Sato (second round)
3. (Canada) Michelle Li (semi-finals)
4. (Japan) Aya Ohori (semi-finals)
5. (Thailand) Busanan Ongbamrungphan (quarter-finals)
6. (Thailand) Pornpawee Chochuwong (quarter-finals)
7. (South Korea) Kim Hyo-min (quarter-finals)
8. (Spain) Beatriz Corrales (first round)

=== Finals ===
Semi-finals
1	(United States) Zhang Beiwen	20	23	21
4	(Japan) Aya Ohori	22	21	13
3	(Canada) Michelle Li	17	17
Q2	(China) Li Xuerui	21	21

Final
1	(United States) Zhang Beiwen	26	15	11
Q2	(China) Li Xuerui	24	21	21

=== Top half ===
==== Section 1 ====
First Round
1	(United States) Zhang BW	21	21
(Germany) Y Li	13	14
(Denmark) M Poulsen	16	13
(China) Zhang YM	21	21
6	(Thailand) P Chochuwong	21	21
PFQ	(United States) D Gupta	10	5
Q1	(United States) I Zhong	15	14
(England) C Birch	21	21

Second Round
1	(United States) Zhang BW	21	21
(China) Zhang YM	14	17
6	(Thailand) P Chochuwong	21	21
(England) C Birch	9	15

Quarter-finals
1	(United States) Zhang BW	21	22	21
6	(Thailand) P Chochuwong	18	24	19

==== Section 2 ====
First Round
4	(Japan) A Ohori	21	21
(Germany) F Deprez	10	17
(United States) J Hsu	16	16
(South Korea) Jeon J-i	21	21
5	(Thailand) B Ongbamrungphan	19	21	21
(Germany) L Heim	21	17	14
(South Korea) Kim G-e	14	13
(China) Han Y	21	21

Second Round
4	(Japan) A Ohori	21	20	21
(South Korea) Jeon J-i	16	22	12
5	(Thailand) B Ongbamrungphan	21	21
(China) Han Y	16	16

Quarter-finals
4	(Japan) A Ohori	21	21
5	(Thailand) B Ongbamrungphan	7	10

=== Bottom half ===
==== Section 3 ====
First Round
(China) Cai YY	22	21
(Vietnam) Vũ T T	20	15
(China) Gao FJ	21	21
8	(Spain) B Corrales	8	11
(Canada) R Honderich	21	21
(India) A Prabhudesai	9	17
Q3	(United States) C Pan	14	16
3	(Canada) M Li	21	21

Second Round
(China) Cai YY	17	14
(China) Gao FJ	21	21
(Canada) R Honderich	12	13
3	(Canada) M Li	21	21

Quarter-finals
(China) Gao FJ	8	19
3	(Canada) M Li	21	21

==== Section 4 ====
First Round
Q4	(United States) L Lam	8	21	12
PFQ	(South Korea) Lee S-y	21	17	21
(Denmark) J D Jakobsen	19	17
7	(South Korea) Kim H-m	21	21
Q2	(China) Li XR	21	21
(Canada) B Tam	15	15
PFQ	(United States) J Gai	15	17
2	(Japan) S Sato	21	21

Second Round
PFQ	(South Korea) Lee S-y	15	13
7	(South Korea) Kim H-m	21	21
Q2	(China) Li XR	22	21
2	(Japan) S Sato	20	9

Quarter-finals
7	(South Korea) Kim H-m	12	14
Q2	(China) Li XR	21	21

== Men's doubles ==
=== Seeds ===
1. (England) Marcus Ellis / Chris Langridge (quarter-finals)
2. (India) Manu Attri / B. Sumeeth Reddy (first round)
3. (Thailand) Tinn Isriyanet / Kittisak Namdash (first round)
4. (Germany) Mark Lamsfuß / Marvin Emil Seidel (first round)
5. (Germany) Josche Zurwonne / Jones Ralfy Jansen (quarter-finals)
6. (Thailand) Nipitphon Phuangphuapet / Nanthakarn Yordphaisong (second round)
7. (Netherlands) Robin Tabeling / Jelle Maas (second round)
8. (China) Han Chengkai / Zhou Haodong (second round)

=== Finals ===
Semi-finals
(South Korea) Kang Min-hyuk (South Korea) Kim Won-ho	21	21
(Canada) Jason Ho-shue (Canada) Nyl Yakura	17	14
(China) Ou Xuanyi (China) Ren Xiangyu	21	21
(South Korea) Jung Jae-wook (South Korea) Kim Jae-hwan	16	18

Final
(South Korea) Kang Min-hyuk (South Korea) Kim Won-ho	21	16	17
(China) Ou Xuanyi (China) Ren Xiangyu	16	21	21

=== Top half ===
==== Section 1 ====
First Round
1	(England) M Ellis (England) C Langridge	21	21
Q4	(United States) H Haryanto (United States) S Pongnairat	10	12
PFQ	(United States) V Chiu (United States) B Zhao	21	21
(United States) P Chew (United States) R Chew	19	18
6	(Thailand) N Phuangphuapet (Thailand) N Yordphaisong	21	6
(Vietnam) Minh B (Vietnam) Đường B Đ	15	3^{r}
Q1	(Croatia) Z Đurkinjak (Thailand) S Viboonsin	14	17
(South Korea) Kang M-h (South Korea) Kim W-h	21	21

Second Round
1	(England) M Ellis (England) C Langridge	21	21
PFQ	(United States) V Chiu (United States) B Zhao	11	8
6	(Thailand) N Phuangphuapet (Thailand) N Yordphaisong	21	16	14
(South Korea) Kang M-h (South Korea) Kim W-h	18	21	21

Quarter-finals
1	(England) M Ellis (England) C Langridge	22	18	14
(South Korea) Kang M-h (South Korea) Kim W-h	20	21	21

==== Section 2 ====
First Round
3	(Thailand) T Isriyanet (Thailand) K Namdash	21	14
(England) B Lane (England) S Vendy	23	21
(Canada) J Ho-shue (Canada) N Yakura	21	21
(United States) M Cohn (United States) D Schoppe	14	13
5	(Germany) J R Jansen (Germany) J Zurwonne	21	23
(Vietnam) Đỗ T Đ (Vietnam) Phạm H N	13	21
(United States) C Lin (Indonesia) F S Surbakti	21	15	16
(United States) A Ahlawat (United States) A Chhikara	19	21	21

Second Round
(England) B Lane (England) S Vendy	11	15
(Canada) J Ho-shue (Canada) N Yakura	21	21
5	(Germany) J R Jansen (Germany) J Zurwonne	21	21
(United States) A Ahlawat (United States) A Chhikara	10	14

Quarter-finals
(Canada) J Ho-shue (Canada) N Yakura	21	21
5	(Germany) J R Jansen (Germany) J Zurwonne	16	16

=== Bottom half ===
==== Section 3 ====
First Round
(Denmark) M Bay-Smidt (Denmark) F Søgaard Mortensen	21	22
(United States) Chan K B (United States) D Gouw	12	20
(England) P Briggs (England) T Wolfenden	19	23	15
7	(Netherlands) J Maas (Netherlands) R Tabeling	21	21	21
(Thailand) P Kune-Anuvit (Thailand) N Trinkajee	15	12
(China) Di ZJ (China) Wang C	21	21
(China) Ou XY (China) Ren XY	21	21
4	(Germany) M Lamsfuß (Germany) M E Seidel	17	18

Second Round
(Denmark) M Bay-Smidt (Denmark) F Søgaard Mortensen	19	22	21
7	(Netherlands) J Maas (Netherlands) R Tabeling	21	20	14
(China) Di ZJ (China) Wang C	14	17
(China) Ou XY (China) Ren XY	21	21

Quarter-finals
(Denmark) M Bay-Smidt (Denmark) F Søgaard Mortensen	21	15	19
(China) Ou XY (China) Ren XY	16	21	21

==== Section 4 ====
First Round
(Thailand) I Apisuk (Thailand) T Viriyangkura	19	18
(South Korea) Kim H-t (South Korea) Park K-h	21	21
(Netherlands) J Arends (Netherlands) R Jille	19	16
8	(China) Han CK (China) Zhou HD	21	21
(South Korea) Jung J-w (South Korea) Kim J-h	14	21	21
Q2	(Chinese Taipei) Kan C-y (Chinese Taipei) Liao C-h	21	16	17
Q3	(Indonesia) R Adianto (Indonesia) R Y Rianto	w	/	o
2	(India) M Attri (India) B. S Reddy

Second Round
(South Korea) Kim H-t (South Korea) Park K-h	21	12	21
8	(China) Han CK (China) Zhou HD	18	21	18
(South Korea) Jung J-w (South Korea) Kim J-h	21	21
Q3	(Indonesia) R Adianto (Indonesia) R Y Rianto	10	18

Quarter-finals
(South Korea) Kim H-t (South Korea) Park K-h	19	19
(South Korea) Jung J-w (South Korea) Kim J-h	21	21

== Women's doubles ==
=== Seeds ===
1. (Japan) Naoko Fukuman / Kurumi Yonao (semi-finals)
2. (Netherlands) Selena Piek / Cheryl Seinen (second round)
3. (France) Émilie Lefel / Anne Tran (second round)
4. (Germany) Isabel Herttrich / Carla Nelte (second round)

=== Finals ===
Semi-finals
1	(Japan) Naoko Fukuman (Japan) Kurumi Yonao	16	10
(South Korea) Kim Hye-jeong (South Korea) Kim So-yeong	21	21
(Malaysia) Chow Mei Kuan (Malaysia) Vivian Hoo Kah Mun	17	20
(China) Tang Jinhua (China) Yu Xiaohan	21	22

Final
(South Korea) Kim Hye-jeong (South Korea) Kim So-yeong	21	13	15
(China) Tang Jinhua (China) Yu Xiaohan	18	21	21

=== Top half ===
==== Section 1 ====
First Round
(United States) M Taruno (United States) A Zhang	5	9
(England) C Birch (England) J Moore	21	21
(Sweden) E Karlsson (Sweden) J Magnusson	13	17
(China) Cao TW (China) Zheng Y	21	21
(United States) A Lee (United States) S Lee	9	12
(Germany) L Efler (Germany) E Janssens	21	21

Second Round
1	(Japan) N Fukuman (Japan) K Yonao	21	21
(England) C Birch (England) J Moore	13	15
(China) Cao TW (China) Zheng Y	21	21
(Germany) L Efler (Germany) E Janssens	17	10

Quarter-finals
1	(Japan) N Fukuman (Japan) K Yonao	17	21	21
(China) Cao TW (China) Zheng Y	21	16	17

==== Section 2 ====
First Round
(England) J Pugh (England) L Smith	12	12
(South Korea) Kim H-j (South Korea) Kim S-y	21	21
(Denmark) J Finne-Ipsen (Denmark) R Søby Hansen	21	21
(United States) A Xu (United States) K Xu	19	15
(Indonesia) D A Surya (United States) J Gozali	12	20
(China) Dong WJ (China) Feng XY	21	22

Second Round
4	(Germany) I Herttrich (Germany) C Nelte	12	14
(South Korea) Kim H-j (South Korea) Kim S-y	21	21
(Denmark) J Finne-Ipsen (Denmark) R Søby Hansen	19	19
(China) Dong WJ (China) Feng XY	21	21

Quarter-finals
(South Korea) Kim H-j (South Korea) Kim S-y	21	21
(China) Dong WJ (China) Feng XY	18	11

=== Bottom half ===
==== Section 3 ====
First Round
(United States) E Lee (United States) P L Obanana	w	/	o
(Thailand) S Amitrapai (Thailand) P Chochuwong
(Sweden) A Högström (Sweden) C Nistad	17	17
(United States) Hong JY (United States) Zhang BW	21	21
(United States) E Kan (United States) I Zhong	9	12
(Malaysia) Chow M K (Malaysia) V Hoo K M	21	21

Second Round
(United States) E Lee (United States) P L Obanana	21	15	21
(United States) Hong JY (United States) Zhang BW	18	21	17
(Malaysia) Chow M K (Malaysia) V Hoo K M	21	21
3	(France) É Lefel (France) A Tran	17	11

Quarter-finals
(United States) E Lee (United States) P L Obanana	8	12
(Malaysia) Chow M K (Malaysia) V Hoo K M	21	21

==== Section 4 ====
First Round
(Thailand) S Paewsampran (Thailand) P Supajirakul	30	21
(Canada) R Honderich (Canada) K Tsai	29	18
(United States) B Chi (United States) M Huang	21	21
(Italy) S Garino (Italy) L Iversen	11	12
(China) Tang JH (China) Yu XH	21	16	21
(Germany) J Goliszewski (Germany) L Käpplein	17	21	8

Second Round
(Thailand) S Paewsampran (Thailand) P Supajirakul	21	21
(United States) B Chi (United States) M Huang	12	10
(China) Tang JH (China) Yu XH	21	21
2	(Netherlands) S Piek (Netherlands) C Seinen	13	10

Quarter-finals
(Thailand) S Paewsampran (Thailand) P Supajirakul	6	14
(China) Tang JH (China) Yu XH	21	21

== Mixed doubles ==
=== Seeds ===
1. (England) Marcus Ellis / Lauren Smith (quarter-finals)
2. (Germany) Mark Lamsfuß / Isabel Herttrich (semi-finals)
3. (Netherlands) Jacco Arends / Selena Piek (first round)
4. (Germany) Marvin Emil Seidel / Linda Efler (final)
5. (Malaysia) Chan Peng Soon / Goh Liu Ying (champions)
6. (China) Lu Kai / Chen Lu (quarter-finals)
7. (England) Ben Lane / Jessica Pugh (semi-finals)
8. (Netherlands) Robin Tabeling / Cheryl Seinen (second round)

=== Finals ===
Semi-finals
7	(England) Ben Lane (England) Jessica Pugh	17	8
4	(Germany) Marvin Emil Seidel (Germany) Linda Efler	21	21
5	(Malaysia) Chan Peng Soon (Malaysia) Goh Liu Ying	21	21
2	(Germany) Mark Lamsfuß (Germany) Isabel Herttrich	16	14

Final
4	(Germany) Marvin Emil Seidel (Germany) Linda Efler	19	15
5	(Malaysia) Chan Peng Soon (Malaysia) Goh Liu Ying	21	21

=== Top half ===
==== Section 1 ====
First Round
1	(England) M Ellis (England) L Smith	21	21
(Thailand) P Kuna-Anuvit (Thailand) S Parwsampran	17	18
(United States) P Chew (United States) A Lee	21	21
(New Zealand) N Tagle (Canada) B Tam	18	17
7	(England) B Lane (England) J Pugh	21	21
(Netherlands) R Jille (France) É Lefel	16	18
Q2	(China) Ou XY (China) Cao TW	21	21
(Israel) M Zilberman (Israel) S Zilberman	17	15

Second Round
1	(England) M Ellis (England) L Smith	21	21
(United States) P Chew (United States) A Lee	7	12
7	(England) B Lane (England) J Pugh	21	21	21
Q2	(China) Ou XY (China) Cao TW	23	16	17

Quarter-finals
1	(England) M Ellis (England) L Smith	21	15
7	(England) B Lane (England) J Pugh	23	21

==== Section 2 ====
First Round
4	(Germany) M E Seidel (Germany) L Efler	21	21
(United States) R Chew (United States) S Lee	14	11
(Vietnam) Đỗ T Đ (Vietnam) Phạm N T	19	7
(Germany) P Käsbauer (Germany) O Konon	21	21
8	(Netherlands) R Tabeling (Netherlands) C Seinen	21	21
Q4	(Thailand) S Viboonsin (United States) Hong JY	9	15
(Germany) J R Jansen (Germany) C Nelte	22	21	21
Q1	(Thailand) S Jomkoh (Thailand) P Supajirakul	24	16	15

Second Round
4	(Germany) M E Seidel (Germany) L Efler	21	21
(Germany) P Käsbauer (Germany) O Konon	18	18
8	(Netherlands) R Tabeling (Netherlands) C Seinen	21	16	12
(Germany) J R Jansen (Germany) C Nelte	14	21	21

Quarter-finals
4	(Germany) M E Seidel (Germany) L Efler	16	25	21
(Germany) J R Jansen (Germany) C Nelte	21	23	12

=== Bottom half ===
==== Section 3 ====
First Round
Q3	(South Korea) Kim J-h (South Korea) Kim S-y	19	21	21
(South Korea) Kim H-t (South Korea) Kim H-j	21	18	11
(South Korea) Seo S-j (South Korea) Chae Y-j	21	19	21
5	(Malaysia) Chan P S (Malaysia) Goh L Y	17	21	23
(France) J Corvée (France) A Tran	11	21	9
(United States) Chan K B (United States) J Gozali	21	18	21
(England) G Mairs (England) J Moore	21	21
3	(Netherlands) J Arends (Netherlands) S Piek	19	17

Second Round
Q3	(South Korea) Kim J-h (South Korea) Kim S-y	14	15
5	(Malaysia) Chan P S (Malaysia) Goh L Y	21	21
(United States) Chan K B (United States) J Gozali	17	19
(England) G Mairs (England) J Moore	21	21

Quarter-finals
5	(Malaysia) Chan P S (Malaysia) Goh L Y	21	16	21
(England) G Mairs (England) J Moore	14	21	14

==== Section 4 ====
First Round
(Canada) N Yakura (Canada) K Tsai	17	23	17
(Germany) J Zurwonne (Germany) E Janssens	21	21	21
(Thailand) N Puuangphuapet (Thailand) S Amitrapai	10	14
6	(China) Lu K (China) Chen L	21	21
PFQ	(United States) M Fogarty (United States) I Zhong	12	7
(United States) H L Lee (United States) P L Obanana	21	21
(Sweden) R Eidestedt (Sweden) C Nistad	11	8
2	(Germany) M Lamsfuß (Germany) I Herttrich	21	21

Second Round
(Germany) J Zurwonne (Germany) E Janssens	11	12
6	(China) Lu K (China) Chen L	21	21
(United States) H L Lee (United States) P L Obanana	12	13
2	(Germany) M Lamsfuß (Germany) I Herttrich	21	21

Quarter-finals
6	(China) Lu K (China) Chen L	9	15
2	(Germany) M Lamsfuß (Germany) I Herttrich	21	21

Preceded by 2018 Australian Open	BWF World Tour; 2018 BWF season	Succeeded by 2018 Canada Open
