= 2018 New Zealand Open (badminton) =

2018 badminton tournament in Auckland

Tournament details
- Dates: 1–6 May
- Level: Super 300
- Total prize money: US$150,000
- Venue: North Shore Events Centre
- Location: Auckland, New Zealand

Champions
- Men's singles: (China) Lin Dan
- Women's singles: (Japan) Sayaka Takahashi
- Men's doubles: (Chinese Taipei) Chen Hung-ling (Chinese Taipei) Wang Chi-lin
- Women's doubles: (Japan) Ayako Sakuramoto (Japan) Yukiko Takahata
- Mixed doubles: (Chinese Taipei) Wang Chi-lin (Chinese Taipei) Lee Chia-hsin

The 2018 New Zealand Open (officially known as the Barfoot & Thompson New Zealand Open 2018 for sponsorship reasons) was a badminton tournament which took place at North Shore Events Centre in Auckland, New Zealand, from 1 to 6 May 2018 and had a total purse of $150,000.

== Tournament ==
The 2018 New Zealand Open was the eighth tournament of the 2018 BWF World Tour and also part of the New Zealand Open championships which had been held since 1990. This tournament was organized by Badminton New Zealand and sanctioned by the BWF.

=== Venue ===
This international tournament was held at North Shore Events Centre in Auckland, New Zealand.

=== Point distribution ===
Below is the point distribution for each phase of the tournament based on the BWF points system for the BWF World Tour Super 300 event.

Winner	Runner-up	3/4	5/8	9/16	17/32	33/64	65/128
7,000	5,950	4,900	3,850	2,750	1,670	660	320

=== Prize money ===
The total prize money for this tournament was US$150,000. Distribution of prize money was in accordance with BWF regulations.

Event	Winner	Finals	Semi-finals	Quarter-finals	Last 16
Singles	$11,250	$5,700	$2,175	$900	$525
Doubles	$11,850	$5,700	$2,100	$1,087.50	$562.50

== Men's singles ==
=== Seeds ===
1. (China) Lin Dan (champion)
2. (Indonesia) Jonatan Christie (final)
3. (India) B. Sai Praneeth (semi-finals)
4. (Chinese Taipei) Hsu Jen-hao (first round)
5. (India) Sameer Verma (quarter-finals)
6. (Indonesia) Tommy Sugiarto (quarter-finals)
7. (India) Parupalli Kashyap (withdrew)
8. (Thailand) Kantaphon Wangcharoen (quarter-finals)

=== Wild card ===
Badminton New Zealand awarded a wild card entry to Abhinav Manota of New Zealand.

=== Finals ===
Semi-finals
1	(China) Lin Dan	21	21
Q4	(South Korea) Heo Kwang-hee	16	16
3	(India) B. Sai Praneeth	21	19	8
2	(Indonesia) Jonatan Christie	14	21	21

Final
1	(China) Lin Dan	21	21
2	(Indonesia) Jonatan Christie	14	19

=== Top half ===
==== Section 1 ====
First Round
1	(China) Lin D	21	21
(Japan) T Ueda	13	12
(India) L Sen	21	21
(Malaysia) Cheam J W	11	16
5	(India) Sa Verma	21	21
(Indonesia) S D Kuncoro	8	10
(Hong Kong) Lee C Y	21	21
(Czech Republic) M Ludík	10	18

Second Round
1	(China) Lin D	15	21	21
(India) L Sen	21	15	12
5	(India) Sa Verma	21	21
(Hong Kong) Lee C Y	17	19

Quarter-finals
1	(China) Lin D	21	21
5	(India) Sa Verma	19	9

==== Section 2 ====
First Round
4	(Chinese Taipei) Hsu J-h	23	12	18
(India) A Jayaram	21	21	21
Q4	(South Korea) Heo K-h	18	21	21
(Indonesia) F A Kholik	21	17	16
8	(Thailand) K Wangcharoen	22	12	21
(India) K R Rajarajan	20	21	8
(Japan) Y Igarashi	21	21
(Malaysia) Chong W F	16	15

Second Round
(India) A Jayaram	15	22	6
Q4	(South Korea) Heo K-h	21	20	21
8	(Thailand) K Wangcharoen	21	11	21
(Japan) Y Igarashi	18	21	13

Quarter-finals
Q4	(South Korea) Heo K-h	21	21
8	(Thailand) K Wangcharoen	7	16

=== Bottom half ===
==== Section 3 ====
First Round
(India) So Verma	19	21	19
WC	(New Zealand) A Manota	21	14	21
(Czech Republic) A Mendrek	21	12	16
PFQ	(Sri Lanka) N Karunaratne	18	21	21
Q3	(China) Sun FX	18	21	18
(Malaysia) Liew D	21	14	21
(Israel) M Zilberman	11	19
3	(India) B. Sai Praneeth	21	21

Second Round
WC	(New Zealand) A Manota	11	16
PFQ	(Sri Lanka) N Karunaratne	21	21
(Malaysia) Liew D	18	17
3	(India) B. Sai Praneeth	21	21

Quarter-finals
PFQ	(Sri Lanka) N Karunaratne	7	9
3	(India) B. Sai Praneeth	21	21

==== Section 4 ====
First Round
Q2	(Japan) K Naraoka	21	19	10
(Indonesia) P A Maulana	11	21	21
(India) S Dey	18	10
6	(Indonesia) T Sugiarto	21	21
(Japan) K Watanabe	21	21
Q1	(Indonesia) V A Saputra	13	14
(China) Zhao JP	19	10
2	(Indonesia) J Christie	21	21

Second Round
(Indonesia) P A Maulana	17	3
6	(Indonesia) T Sugiarto	21	21
(Japan) K Watanabe	13	15
2	(Indonesia) J Christie	21	21

Quarter-finals
6	(Indonesia) T Sugiarto	21	5^{r}
2	(Indonesia) J Christie	17	14

== Women's singles ==
=== Seeds ===
1. (Japan) Sayaka Takahashi (champion)
2. (Chinese Taipei) Lee Chia-hsin (first round)
3. (Indonesia) Fitriani (second round)
4. (Japan) Minatsu Mitani (semi-finals)
5. (Turkey) Neslihan Yiğit (withdrew)
6. (Indonesia) Gregoria Mariska Tunjung (quarter-finals)
7. (Japan) Haruko Suzuki (quarter-finals)
8. (Japan) Natsuki Nidaira (first round)

=== Wild card ===
Badminton New Zealand awarded a wild card entry to Sally Fu of New Zealand.

=== Finals ===
Semi-finals
1	(Japan) Sayaka Takahashi	17	21	21
4	(Japan) Minatsu Mitani	21	12	11
(China) Zhang Yiman	21	21
(China) Han Yue	19	15

Final
1	(Japan) Sayaka Takahashi	21	21
(China) Zhang Yiman	13	14

=== Top half ===
==== Section 1 ====
First Round
1	(Japan) S Takahashi	21	21
(South Korea) Jeon J-i	6	14
(India) V R Jakka	16	19
(Australia) Chen H-y	21	21
PFQ	(Thailand) M Hemrachatanun	21	21
PFQ	(England) G Bland	19	17
(Australia) J Tam	9	11
(Thailand) P Chaiwan	21	21

Second Round
1	(Japan) S Takahashi	21	21
(Australia) Chen H-y	7	7
PFQ	(Thailand) M Hemrachatanun
(Thailand) P Chaiwan	w	/	o

Quarter-finals
1	(Japan) S Takahashi	21	21
(Thailand) P Chaiwan	10	11

==== Section 2 ====
First Round
4	(Japan) M Mitani	21	21
(Indonesia) Y Y Susanto	13	6
(Indonesia) J Muljati	9	5
PFQ	(South Korea) Kim G-e	21	21
7	(Japan) H Suzuki	21	21
Q1	(New Zealand) S Li	12	9
Q2	(Japan) Y Nakai	21	21
(India) S U R Chukka	14	13

Second Round
4	(Japan) M Mitani	21	21
PFQ	(South Korea) Kim G-e	15	18
7	(Japan) H Suzuki	21	21
Q2	(Japan) Y Nakai	19	13

Quarter-finals
4	(Japan) M Mitani	21	21
7	(Japan) H Suzuki	17	11

=== Bottom half ===
==== Section 3 ====
First Round
Q3	(China) Ji ST	21	21
PFQ	(United States) D Gupta	13	13
PFQ	(Thailand) C Jucharoen	21	11
8	(Japan) N Nidaira	19	19^{r}
WC	(New Zealand) S Fu	15	11
(China) Zhang YM	21	21
Q4	(United States) C Pan	12	2
3	(Indonesia) Fitriani	21	21

Second Round
Q3	(China) Ji ST	21	14	18
PFQ	(Thailand) C Jucharoen	17	21	21
(China) Zhang YM	21	15	21
3	(Indonesia) Fitriani	17	21	17

Quarter-finals
PFQ	(Thailand) C Jucharoen	16	16
(China) Zhang YM	21	21

==== Section 4 ====
First Round
(Israel) K Polikarpova	18	9
(Switzerland) S Jaquet	21	21
(Canada) B Tam	17	19
6	(Indonesia) G M Tunjung	21	21
(China) Cai YY	21	21
(Indonesia) R Hartawan	10	15
(China) Han Y	21	21
2	(Chinese Taipei) Lee C-h	11	11

Second Round
(Switzerland) S Jaquet	5	12
6	(Indonesia) G M Tunjung	21	21
(China) Cai YY	11	17
(China) Han Y	21	21

Quarter-finals
6	(Indonesia) G M Tunjung	19	16
(China) Han Y	21	21

== Men's doubles ==
=== Seeds ===
1. (Chinese Taipei) Chen Hung-ling / Wang Chi-lin (champions)
2. (Indonesia) Berry Angriawan / Hardianto (final)
3. (Thailand) Kittinupong Kedren / Dechapol Puavaranukroh (second round)
4. (Thailand) Bodin Isara / Nipitphon Phuangphuapet (semi-finals)
5. (India) Manu Attri / B. Sumeeth Reddy (quarter-finals)
6. (Indonesia) Wahyu Nayaka / Ade Yusuf Santoso (second round)
7. (China) He Jiting / Tan Qiang (semi-finals)
8. (India) Francis Alwin / Nandagopal Kidambi (first round)

=== Finals ===
Semi-finals
1	(Chinese Taipei) Chen Hung-ling (Chinese Taipei) Wang Chi-lin	21	21
7	(China) He Jiting (China) Tan Qiang	14	13
4	(Thailand) Bodin Isara (Thailand) Nipitphon Phuangphuapet	18	16
2	(Indonesia) Berry Angriawan (Indonesia) Hardianto	21	21

Final
1	(Chinese Taipei) Chen Hung-ling (Chinese Taipei) Wang Chi-lin	21	21
2	(Indonesia) Berry Angriawan (Indonesia) Hardianto	17	17

=== Top half ===
==== Section 1 ====
First Round
1	(Chinese Taipei) Chen H-l (Chinese Taipei) Wang C-l	21	21
Q1	(New Zealand) V Harris (New Zealand) K Zhang	13	6
(New Zealand) J Boyle (New Zealand) M Graham	8	7
(South Korea) Jung T-i (South Korea) Kim H-t	21	21
8	(India) F Alwin (India) N Kidambi	15	13
(Indonesia) S K Gutama (Indonesia) F W Putra	21	21
(China) Chai B (China) Wang ZK	21	21
(Vietnam) Bảo M (Vietnam) Dương B Đ	6	16

Second Round
1	(Chinese Taipei) Chen H-l (Chinese Taipei) Wang C-l	21	21
(South Korea) Jung T-i (South Korea) Kim H-t	13	12
(Indonesia) S K Gutama (Indonesia) F W Putra	19	14
(China) Chai B (China) Wang ZK	21	21

Quarter-finals
1	(Chinese Taipei) Chen H-l (Chinese Taipei) Wang C-l	21	21
(China) Chai B (China) Wang ZK	11	17

==== Section 2 ====
First Round
3	(Thailand) K Kedren (Thailand) D Puavaranukroh	17	21	21
(Malaysia) Tan B H (South Korea) Yoo Y-s	21	9	14
(South Korea) Choi H-g (South Korea) Park K-h	10	17
(Thailand) I Apisuk (Thailand) T Viriyangkura	21	21
7	(China) He JT (China) Tan Q	21	21
(India) R Kapoor (India) S Sharma	13	13
Q4	(Indonesia) A B Cahyono (Indonesia) M R P Isfahani	21	21
(India) Arjun M.R. (India) R Shlok	12	14

Second Round
3	(Thailand) K Kedren (Thailand) D Puavaranukroh	18	19
(Thailand) I Apisuk (Thailand) T Viriyangkura	21	21
7	(China) He JT (China) Tan Q	21	18	21
Q4	(Indonesia) A B Cahyono (Indonesia) M R P Isfahani	18	21	13

Quarter-finals
(Thailand) I Apisuk (Thailand) T Viriyangkura	24	18	14
7	(China) He JT (China) Tan Q	22	21	21

=== Bottom half ===
==== Section 3 ====
First Round
(Thailand) P Kuna-anuvit (Thailand) N Trinkajee	21	21
Q2	(Denmark) J Lindqvist (New Zealand) C Steeghs	8	14
(New Zealand) J Curtin (New Zealand) D Oud	14	15
5	(India) M Attri (India) B. S Reddy	21	21
(Australia) C Chen (Australia) T Wong	9	12
(New Zealand) O Guo (New Zealand) D Vong	21	21
(Vietnam) Đỗ T Đ (Vietnam) Phạm H N	17	15
4	(Thailand) B Isara (Thailand) N Phuangphuapet	21	21

Second Round
(Thailand) P Kuna-anuvit (Thailand) N Trinkajee	9	12
5	(India) M Attri (India) B. S Reddy	21	21
(New Zealand) O Guo (New Zealand) D Vong	12	15
4	(Thailand) B Isara (Thailand) N Phuangphuapet	21	21

Quarter-finals
5	(India) M Attri (India) B. S Reddy	10	15
4	(Thailand) B Isara (Thailand) N Phuangphuapet	21	21

==== Section 4 ====
First Round
(Australia) S Leung (Australia) M Wheller	13	9
(Malaysia) Chan P S (Malaysia) Chen T J	21	21
(Malaysia) M A Abdul Latif (Malaysia) N M A Ayub
6	(Indonesia) W Nayaka (Indonesia) A Y Santoso	w	/	o
Q3	(New Zealand) T Ellis (New Zealand) W Newman	13	15
(China) Ou XY (China) Ren XY	21	21
(New Zealand) R Cheng (New Zealand) J Feng	5	7
2	(Indonesia) B Angriawan (Indonesia) Hardianto	21	21

Second Round
(Malaysia) Chan P S (Malaysia) Chen T J	21	22
6	(Indonesia) W Nayaka (Indonesia) A Y Santoso	19	20
(China) Ou XY (China) Ren XY	21	19	7
2	(Indonesia) B Angriawan (Indonesia) Hardianto	15	21	21

Quarter-finals
(Malaysia) Chan P S (Malaysia) Chen T J	21	17	16
2	(Indonesia) B Angriawan (Indonesia) Hardianto	13	21	21

== Women's doubles ==
=== Seeds ===
1. (Indonesia) Della Destiara Haris / Rizki Amelia Pradipta (quarter-finals)
2. (Japan) Naoko Fukuman / Kurumi Yonao (quarter-finals)
3. (Malaysia) Chow Mei Kuan / Lee Meng Yean (first round)
4. (Japan) Misato Aratama / Akane Watanabe (first round)

=== Finals ===
Semi-finals
(Japan) Ayako Sakuramoto (Japan) Yukiko Takahata	21	21
(Japan) Arisa Higashino (Japan) Kie Nakanishi	16	9
(South Korea) Kim Hye-rin (South Korea) Kong Hee-yong	21	10	18
(China) Cao Tongwei (China) Zheng Yu	15	21	21

Final
(Japan) Ayako Sakuramoto (Japan) Yukiko Takahata	21	21
(China) Cao Tongwei (China) Zheng Yu	9	19

=== Top half ===
==== Section 1 ====
First Round
(India) M Jakkampudi (India) P S Ram	21	21
(New Zealand) E Calder-Hawkins (New Zealand) J Ng C M	17	14
(Indonesia) Y Barkah (Indonesia) R E Putri Sari	13	10
(Japan) A Sakuramoto (Japan) Y Takahata	21	21
(New Zealand) S L Lee (New Zealand) J Villegas	12	4
(Thailand) R Laisuan (Thailand) S Mingchua	21	21

Second Round
1	(Indonesia) D D Haris (Indonesia) R A Pradipta	21	21
(India) M Jakkampudi (India) P S Ram	15	6
(Japan) A Sakuramoto (Japan) Y Takahata	21	21
(Thailand) R Laisuan (Thailand) S Mingchua	15	7

Quarter-finals
1	(Indonesia) D D Haris (Indonesia) R A Pradipta	8	21	15
(Japan) A Sakuramoto (Japan) Y Takahata	21	15	21

==== Section 2 ====
First Round
4	(Japan) M Aratama (Japan) A Watanabe	17	12
(Malaysia) Goh Y C (Malaysia) V Hoo K M	21	21
(New Zealand) T Otene (New Zealand) J Yu	4	5
(Japan) A Higashino (Japan) K Nakanishi	21	21
(South Korea) Baek H-n (South Korea) Lee Y-r	21	21
(New Zealand) C Alley (New Zealand) E Smith	6	2
(Japan) N Matsuyama (Japan) C Shida
(Thailand) S Parwsampren (Thailand) P Supajirakul	w	/	o

Second Round
(Malaysia) Goh Y C (Malaysia) V Hoo K M	19	17
(Japan) A Higashino (Japan) K Nakanishi	21	21
(South Korea) Baek H-n (South Korea) Lee Y-r	21	15	21
(Thailand) S Parwsampren (Thailand) P Supajirakul	15	21	9

Quarter-finals
(Japan) A Higashino (Japan) K Nakanishi	21	21
(South Korea) Baek H-n (South Korea) Lee Y-r	17	17

=== Bottom half ===
==== Section 3 ====
First Round
(Malaysia) Cheah Y S (Malaysia) Peck Y W
(South Korea) Kim H-r (South Korea) Kong H-y	w	/	o
(New Zealand) S Leydon-Davis (New Zealand) Xie YS
(Indonesia) A S Awanda (Indonesia) M C Sahputri	w	/	o
(New Zealand) J Jiang (New Zealand) S Li	11	13
(Indonesia) N K M Istirani (Indonesia) N K Maheswari	21	21
(South Korea) Chae Y-j (South Korea) Kim H-j	21	23	21
3	(Malaysia) Chow M K (Malaysia) Lee M Y	15	25	16

Second Round
(South Korea) Kim H-r (South Korea) Kong H-y	21	18	21
(Indonesia) A S Awanda (Indonesia) M C Sahputri	18	21	19
(Indonesia) N K M Istirani (Indonesia) N K Maheswari	15	21	11
(South Korea) Chae Y-j (South Korea) Kim H-j	21	16	21

Quarter-finals
(South Korea) Kim H-r (South Korea) Kong H-y	21	21
(South Korea) Chae Y-j (South Korea) Kim H-j	18	19

==== Section 4 ====
First Round
(China) Cao TW (China) Zheng Y	21	21
(New Zealand) S Fu (New Zealand) A Tagle	8	7
(China) Huang DP (China) Li WM
(Japan) Y Nakai (Japan) N Ono	w	/	o
(New Zealand) R Apalisok (New Zealand) A Tan	w	/	o
(China) Du Y (China) Li YH
(New Zealand) A Pak (New Zealand) F A Rahardja	12	11
2	(Japan) N Fukuman (Japan) K Yonao	21	21

Second Round
(China) Cao TW (China) Zheng Y	21	21
(Japan) Y Nakai (Japan) N Ono	8	15
(New Zealand) R Apalisok (New Zealand) A Tan	3	6
2	(Japan) N Fukuman (Japan) K Yonao	21	21

Quarter-finals
(China) Cao TW (China) Zheng Y	21	21
2	(Japan) N Fukuman (Japan) K Yonao	16	15

== Mixed doubles ==
=== Seeds ===
1. (Thailand) Dechapol Puavaranukroh / Sapsiree Taerattanachai (semi-finals)
2. (China) He Jiting / Du Yue (semi-finals)
3. (Chinese Taipei) Wang Chi-lin / Lee Chia-hsin (champions)
4. (India) Pranav Chopra / N. Sikki Reddy (withdrew)
5. (South Korea) Choi Sol-gyu / Kim Ha-na (first round)
5. (South Korea) Seo Seung-jae / Chae Yoo-jung (final)
7. (China) Wang Zekang / Li Yinhui (withdrew)
8. (Malaysia) Chan Peng Soon / Goh Liu Ying (quarter-finals)

=== Finals ===
Semi-finals
1	(Thailand) Dechapol Puavaranukroh (Thailand) Sapsiree Taerattanachai	21	15	15
5	(South Korea) Seo Seung-jae (South Korea) Chae Yoo-jung	16	21	21
3	(Chinese Taipei) Wang Chi-lin (Chinese Taipei) Lee Chia-hsin	17	21	21
2	(China) He Jiting (China) Du Yue	21	18	18

Final
5	(South Korea) Seo Seung-jae (South Korea) Chae Yoo-jung	19	21	19
3	(Chinese Taipei) Wang Chi-lin (Chinese Taipei) Lee Chia-hsin	21	14	21

=== Top half ===
==== Section 1 ====
First Round
1	(Thailand) D Puavaranukroh (Thailand) S Taerattanachai	21	21
Q3	(New Zealand) A Jeffery (Australia) K Xu	9	4
(India) R Kapoor (India) K Garg	11	21	21
(Israel) M Zilberman (Israel) K Polikarpova	21	7	10
5	(South Korea) Choi S-g (South Korea) Kim H-n	17	12
(Indonesia) R Alexander (Indonesia) A Saufika	21	21
(Indonesia) Y E Saputra (Indonesia) M G islami	21	21
(United States) M Fogarty (United States) I Zhong	10	9

Second Round
1	(Thailand) D Puavaranukroh (Thailand) S Taerattanachai	21	21
(India) R Kapoor (India) K Garg	11	11
(Indonesia) R Alexander (Indonesia) A Saufika	21	22
(Indonesia) Y E Saputra (Indonesia) M G islami	17	20

Quarter-finals
1	(Thailand) D Puavaranukroh (Thailand) S Taerattanachai	21	21
(Indonesia) R Alexander (Indonesia) A Saufika	15	11

==== Section 2 ====
First Round
PFQ	(Australia) C Chen (Australia) J Tam	6	8
(Indonesia) H Faizal (Indonesia) G E Widjaja	21	21
(China) Ou XY (China) Cao TW	21	21
(Thailand) P Kuna-Anuvit (Thailand) S Paewsampran	17	16
5	(South Korea) Seo S-j (South Korea) Chae Y-j	21	20	21
(Malaysia) Chen T J (Malaysia) Peck Y W	16	22	15
(Indonesia) R K Suwardi (Indonesia) D Susanto	13	21	21
(Thailand) S Jomkoh (Thailand) P Supajirakul	21	13	17

Second Round
(Indonesia) H Faizal (Indonesia) G E Widjaja	21	19	14
(China) Ou XY (China) Cao TW	19	21	21
5	(South Korea) Seo S-j (South Korea) Chae Y-j	18	21	21
(Indonesia) R K Suwardi (Indonesia) D Susanto	21	17	19

Quarter-finals
(China) Ou XY (China) Cao TW	19	16
5	(South Korea) Seo S-j (South Korea) Chae Y-j	21	21

=== Bottom half ===
==== Section 3 ====
First Round
(India) S Sharma (India) P S Ram	21	21
(New Zealand) N Tagle (New Zealand) F A Rahardja	19	11
Q4	(South Korea) Kang M-h (South Korea) Baek H-n	8	18
8	(Malaysia) Chan P S (Malaysia) Goh L Y	21	21
(New Zealand) J Feng (New Zealand) S Li	5	10
(South Korea) Park K-h (South Korea) Kong H-y	21	21
(South Korea) Kim W-h (South Korea) Lee Y-r	16	21	19
3	(Chinese Taipei) Wang C-l (Chinese Taipei) Lee C-h	21	19	21

Second Round
(India) S Sharma (India) P S Ram	16	14
8	(Malaysia) Chan P S (Malaysia) Goh L Y	21	21
(South Korea) Park K-h (South Korea) Kong H-y	18	16
3	(Chinese Taipei) Wang C-l (Chinese Taipei) Lee C-h	21	21

Quarter-finals
8	(Malaysia) Chan P S (Malaysia) Goh L Y	21	16	22
3	(Chinese Taipei) Wang C-l (Chinese Taipei) Lee C-h	16	21	24

==== Section 4 ====
First Round
(New Zealand) M Phillips (New Zealand) A Pak	17	13
(Vietnam) Đỗ T Đ (Vietnam) Phạm N T	21	21
(New Zealand) J Boyle (New Zealand) J Yu	18	22	4
PFQ	(New Zealand) D Oud (New Zealand) J Ng C M	21	20	21
(New Zealand) D Vong (New Zealand) A Tagle	11	8
Q2	(South Korea) Kim H-t (South Korea) Kim H-j	21	21
Q1	(New Zealand) A Manota (New Zealand) J Villegas	4	9
2	(China) He JT (China) Du Y	21	21

Second Round
(Vietnam) Đỗ T Đ (Vietnam) Phạm N T	21	21
PFQ	(New Zealand) D Oud (New Zealand) J Ng C M	18	13
Q2	(South Korea) Kim H-t (South Korea) Kim H-j	14	15
2	(China) He JT (China) Du Y	21	21

Quarter-finals
(Vietnam) Đỗ T Đ (Vietnam) Phạm N T	12	11
2	(China) He JT (China) Du Y	21	21

Preceded by 2018 Lingshui China Masters	BWF World Tour; 2018 BWF season	Succeeded by 2018 Australian Open
