= 2017 U.S. Open =

2017 U.S. Open may refer to:

- 2017 U.S. Open (golf), a major golf tournament
- 2017 US Open (tennis), a grand slam tennis event
- 2017 Lamar Hunt U.S. Open Cup, a soccer tournament for U.S. teams
- 2017 U.S. Open Grand Prix Gold, a badminton tournament
