= 2016 Canada Open Grand Prix =

Tournament details
- Dates: 28 June – 3 July 2016
- Level: Grand Prix
- Total prize money: US$55,000
- Venue: Markin MacPhail Centre
- Location: Calgary, Alberta, Canada

Champions
- Men's singles: (India) B. Sai Praneeth
- Women's singles: (Canada) Michelle Li
- Men's doubles: (India) Manu Attri (India) B. Sumeeth Reddy
- Women's doubles: (Australia) Setyana Mapasa (Australia) Gronya Somerville
- Mixed doubles: (Vietnam) Do Tuan Duc (Vietnam) Pham Nhu Thao

The 2016 Canada Open Grand Prix, parallel with the 2016 Chinese Taipei Open Grand Prix Gold, was the eighth/ninth Grand Prix's badminton tournament of the 2016 BWF Grand Prix and Grand Prix Gold. The tournament was held at the Markin MacPhail Centre in Calgary, Alberta, Canada on 28 June – 3 July 2016 and had a total purse of $55,000.

== Men's singles ==
=== Seeds ===
1. (India) Ajay Jayaram (semifinal)
2. (India) H. S. Prannoy (quarterfinal)
3. (South Korea) Lee Hyun-il (final)
4. (India) B. Sai Praneeth (champion)
5. (Vietnam) Nguyen Tien Minh (withdrew)
6. (Spain) Pablo Abián (quarterfinal)
7. (France) Brice Leverdez (semifinal)
8. (Estonia) Raul Must (quarterfinal)

=== Finals ===
Quarterfinals
1	(India) Ajay Jayaram	21	19	21
(India) Harsheel Dani	18	21	8
3	(South Korea) Lee Hyun-il	21	21
6	(Spain) Pablo Abián	14	17
8	(Estonia) Raul Must	14	16
4	(India) B. Sai Praneeth	21	21
7	(France) Brice Leverdez	20	23	21
2	(India) H. S. Prannoy	22	21	18

Semifinals
1	(India) Ajay Jayaram	9	8
3	(South Korea) Lee Hyun-il	21	21
4	(India) B. Sai Praneeth	22	19	21
7	(France) Brice Leverdez	20	21	12

Final
3	(South Korea) Lee Hyun-il	12	10
4	(India) B. Sai Praneeth	21	21

=== Top half ===
==== Section 1 ====
First Round
1	(India) A Jayaram
BYE
(Canada) M Giuffre	21	21
(Jamaica) S Ricketts	7	6
(Chinese Taipei) Lee H-m	21	21
(Canada) K Grymonpre	13	11
(Canada) I Wadia	13	10
(Austria) D Obernosterer	21	21

Second Round
1	(India) A Jayaram	17	21	21
(Canada) M Giuffre	21	17	13
(Chinese Taipei) Lee H-m	10	10
(Austria) D Obernosterer	21	21

Third Round
1	(India) A Jayaram	21	21
(Austria) D Obernosterer	10	12

==== Section 2 ====
First Round
5	(Vietnam) Nguyen T M
BYE
(India) H Dani	21	21
(Canada) T Chiu	11	14
(Scotland) A Casey	21	12	21
(Canada) G Robb	13	21	15
(Canada) B C Holcek	13	12
(India) P Joshi	21	21

Second Round
5	(Vietnam) Nguyen T M
(India) H Dani	w	/	o
(Scotland) A Casey	13	12
(India) P Joshi	21	21

Third Round
(India) H Dani	21	21
(India) P Joshi	9	18

==== Section 3 ====
First Round
3	(South Korea) Lee H-i
BYE
(Canada) J Liu	17	13
(Sweden) H Hurskainen	21	21
(Canada) K Barkman	11	14
(United States) H Shu	21	21
(Republic of Ireland) J Magee	20	24	21
(Canada) T A Lindeman	22	22	8

Second Round
3	(South Korea) Lee H-i	21	21
(Sweden) H Hurskainen	12	13
(United States) H Shu	21	21
(Republic of Ireland) J Magee	15	12

Third Round
3	(South Korea) Lee H-i	21	22
(United States) H Shu	7	20

==== Section 4 ====
First Round
6	(Spain) P Abián
BYE
(Canada) N Osborne	9	10
(Sweden) M Westerback	21	21
(Canada) E Chan	15	15
(Guatemala) K Cordon	21	21
(Canada) K Lee	21	21
(United States) D Schoppe	14	7

Second Round
6	(Spain) P Abián	21	21
(Sweden) M Westerback	16	17
(Guatemala) K Cordon	21	24
(Canada) K Lee	16	22

Third Round
6	(Spain) P Abián	21	16	21
(Guatemala) K Cordon	16	21	13

=== Bottom half ===
==== Section 5 ====
First Round
(Austria) R Gnedt	7	6
(India) R. M. V. Gurusaidutt	21	21
(United States) Y T Chan	11	16
(Canada) J Lai	21	21
(Canada) P Dostie-Guindon	w	/	o
(Mexico) A Hernandez
BYE
8	(Estonia) R Must

Second Round
(India) R. M. V. Gurusaidutt	21	21
(Canada) J Lai	8	6
(Canada) P Dostie-Guindon	15	17
8	(Estonia) R Must	21	21

Third Round
(India) R. M. V. Gurusaidutt	12	21	17
8	(Estonia) R Must	21	7	21

==== Section 6 ====
First Round
(Indonesia) N E Sulistyo	21	19	21
(Canada) S Mcgowan	19	21	16
(Canada) W Shi	21	21
(Brazil) Y C D Oliveira	13	19
(Chinese Taipei) Kan C-y	21	21
(Canada) G Mac Innes	9	9
BYE
4	(India) B. S Praneeth

Second Round
(Indonesia) N E Sulistyo	14	19
(Canada) W Shi	21	21
(Chinese Taipei) Kan C-y	24	16
4	(India) B. S Praneeth	26	21

Third Round
(Canada) W Shi	19	12
4	(India) B. S Praneeth	21	21

==== Section 7 ====
First Round
(Canada) A Ko	21	17	21
(Trinidad and Tobago) N Bonkowsky	18	21	16
(Sri Lanka) N Karunaratne	21	21
(Canada) J A Ho-Shue	13	14
(Canada) A Lin	19	13
(Portugal) P Martins	21	21
BYE
7	(France) B Leverdez

Second Round
(Canada) A Ko	8	17
(Sri Lanka) N Karunaratne	21	21
(Portugal) P Martins	21	13	15
7	(France) B Leverdez	17	21	21

Third Round
(Sri Lanka) N Karunaratne	7	21	14
7	(France) B Leverdez	21	14	21

==== Section 8 ====
First Round
(Jamaica) M Lee	10	12
(Canada) A Li	21	21
(Canada) B. R. Sankeerth	21	22
(Israel) M Zilberman	17	20
(Canada) J Akin-Mulrooney	13	11
(Sweden) M Borg	21	21
BYE
2	(India) H. S. Prannoy

Second Round
(Canada) A Li	20	21
(Canada) B. R. Sankeerth	22	23
(Sweden) M Borg	21	11	15
2	(India) H. S. Prannoy	13	21	21

Third Round
(Canada) B. R. Sankeerth	18	21	12
2	(India) H. S. Prannoy	21	18	21

== Women's singles ==
=== Seeds ===
1. (Canada) Michelle Li (champion)
2. (United States) Zhang Beiwen (final)
3. (United States) Iris Wang (semifinal)
4. (Bulgaria) Linda Zetchiri (semifinal)

=== Finals ===
Semifinals
1	(Canada) Michelle Li	21	21
3	(United States) Iris Wang	14	16
4	(Bulgaria) Linda Zetchiri	20	16
2	(United States) Zhang Beiwen	22	21

Final
1	(Canada) Michelle Li	w	/	o
2	(United States) Zhang Beiwen

=== Top half ===
==== Section 1 ====
First Round
1	(Canada) M Li
BYE
(Republic of Ireland) C Magee	10	21	21
(Canada) T Yi	21	18	19
(Hungary) L Sarosi	20	26	21
(Vietnam) Vu T T	22	24	17
(France) D Lansac	12	13
(Canada) Q Ouyang	21	21

Second Round
1	(Canada) M Li	21	21
(Republic of Ireland) C Magee	16	14
(Hungary) L Sarosi	21	21
(Canada) Q Ouyang	16	11

Quarterfinals
1	(Canada) M Li	21	21
(Hungary) L Sarosi	13	15

==== Section 2 ====
First Round
3	(United States) I Wang
BYE
(Canada) E Hermanto	13	13
(Chinese Taipei) Su H-l	21	21
(United States) M Chen	21	21
(Canada) C Rowe	11	17
(India) T Lad	21	21
(Denmark) J Finne-Ipsen	17	10

Second Round
3	(United States) I Wang	21	21
(Chinese Taipei) Su H-l	19	11
(United States) M Chen	14	15
(India) T Lad	21	21

Quarterfinals
3	(United States) I Wang	21	15	21
(India) T Lad	16	21	10

=== Bottom half ===
==== Section 3 ====
First Round
(Canada) K O'Donoghue	14	14
(India) R S Gadde	21	21
(Canada) J Y Chen	9	16
(Austria) E Baldauf	21	21
(Switzerland) S Jaquet	21	21
(Canada) R Honderich	14	10
(Italy) J Cicognini	11	13
4	(Bulgaria) L Zetchiri	21	21

Second Round
(India) R S Gadde	24	21
(Austria) E Baldauf	22	18
(Switzerland) S Jaquet	18	14
4	(Bulgaria) L Zetchiri	21	21

Quarterfinals
(India) R S Gadde	16	12
4	(Bulgaria) L Zetchiri	21	21

==== Section 4 ====
First Round
(Canada) E L O'Donoghue	9	7
(Spain) B Corrales	21	21
(Canada) C Choi	21	12	13
(Chinese Taipei) Hung Y-t	18	21	21
(Brazil) L Vicente	12	19
(Canada) O Lei	21	21
BYE
2	(United States) Zhang BW

Second Round
(Spain) B Corrales	21	21
(Chinese Taipei) Hung Y-t	8	16
(Canada) O Lei	18	14
2	(United States) Zhang BW	21	21

Quarterfinals
(Spain) B Corrales	19	18
2	(United States) Zhang BW	21	21

== Men's doubles ==
=== Seeds ===
1. (India) Manu Attri / B. Sumeeth Reddy (champion)
2. (India) Pranaav Jerry Chopra / Akshay Dewalkar (withdrew)
3. (Australia) Matthew Chau / Sawan Serasinghe (quarterfinal)
4. (Republic of Ireland) Joshua Magee / Sam Magee (semifinal)

=== Finals ===
Semifinals
1	(India) Manu Attri (India) B. Sumeeth Reddy	21	21
(Indonesia) Andrei Adistia (Canada) Adam Dong	15	19
4	(Republic of Ireland) Joshua Magee (Republic of Ireland) Sam Magee	19	11
(Canada) Adrian Liu (Canada) Toby Ng	21	21

Final
1	(India) Manu Attri (India) B. Sumeeth Reddy	21	21
(Canada) Adrian Liu (Canada) Toby Ng	8	14

=== Top half ===
==== Section 1 ====
First Round
1	(India) M Attri (India) B. S Reddy
BYE
(Canada) T Chiu (Canada) J A Ho-Shue
BYE
(Canada) T Chen (Chinese Taipei) Liao C-h
BYE
(Canada) A J Bauer (Canada) T A Lindeman	21	17	19
(Vietnam) Bao M (Vietnam) Duong B D	10	21	21

Second Round
1	(India) M Attri (India) B. S Reddy	21	21
(Canada) T Chiu (Canada) J A Ho-Shue	8	10
(Canada) T Chen (Chinese Taipei) Liao C-h	21	21
(Vietnam) Bao M (Vietnam) Duong B D	12	17

Quarterfinals
1	(India) M Attri (India) B. S Reddy	w	/	o
(Canada) T Chen (Chinese Taipei) Liao C-h

==== Section 2 ====
First Round
3	(Australia) M Chau (Australia) S Serasinghe
BYE
(Japan) T Shimada (Japan) Y Takeuchi	21	21
(Canada) A Li (Canada) I Wadia	6	12
(Chinese Taipei) Kan C-y (Chinese Taipei) Lee H-m
BYE
(Indonesia) A Adistia (Canada) A Dong	21	21
(Canada) A Ko (Canada) N Osborne	14	12

Second Round
3	(Australia) M Chau (Australia) S Serasinghe	21	21
(Japan) T Shimada (Japan) Y Takeuchi	19	16
(Chinese Taipei) Kan C-y (Chinese Taipei) Lee H-m	14	11
(Indonesia) A Adistia (Canada) A Dong	21	21

Quarterfinals
3	(Australia) M Chau (Australia) S Serasinghe	18	12
(Indonesia) A Adistia (Canada) A Dong	21	21

=== Bottom half ===
==== Section 3 ====
First Round
(Scotland) A Casey (United States) D Schoppe	5	6
(Sweden) R Eidestedt (Sweden) N Ruponen	21	21
BYE
(Canada) J B T Lai (Canada) A Lin
(Trinidad and Tobago) N Bonkowsky (United States) Y T Chan	2	13
(Canada) B.R. Sankeerth (Canada) W Shi	21	21
BYE
4	(Republic of Ireland) J Magee (Republic of Ireland) S Magee

Second Round
(Sweden) R Eidestedt (Sweden) N Ruponen	21	21
(Canada) J B T Lai (Canada) A Lin	11	12
(Canada) B.R. Sankeerth (Canada) W Shi	25	21	19
4	(Republic of Ireland) J Magee (Republic of Ireland) S Magee	27	19	21

Quarterfinals
(Sweden) R Eidestedt (Sweden) N Ruponen	15	19
4	(Republic of Ireland) J Magee (Republic of Ireland) S Magee	21	21

==== Section 4 ====
First Round
(Canada) A Liu (Canada) T Ng	21	19	21
(Indonesia) J Wiratama (Canada) N Yakura	13	21	15
BYE
(Canada) B C Holcek (Canada) K Lee
BYE
(Canada) K Barkman (Canada) K Grymonpre
BYE
2	(India) P J Chopra (India) A Dewalkar

Second Round
(Canada) A Liu (Canada) T Ng	21	21
(Canada) B C Holcek (Canada) K Lee	16	9
(Canada) K Barkman (Canada) K Grymonpre	w	/	o
2	(India) P J Chopra (India) A Dewalkar

Quarterfinals
(Canada) A Liu (Canada) T Ng	21	21
(Canada) K Barkman (Canada) K Grymonpre	10	13

== Women's doubles ==
=== Seeds ===
1. (India) Jwala Gutta / Ashwini Ponnappa (second round)
2. (England) Heather Olver / Lauren Smith (final)

=== Finals ===
Semifinals
(Australia) Leanne Choo (Canada) Rachel Honderich	19	10
(Australia) Setyana Mapasa (Australia) Gronya Somerville	21	21
(Chinese Taipei) Hung Yi-ting (Chinese Taipei) Su Hsiang-ling	12	10
2	(England) Heather Olver (England) Lauren Smith	21	21

Final
(Australia) Setyana Mapasa (Australia) Gronya Somerville	21	21
2	(England) Heather Olver (England) Lauren Smith	15	16

=== Top half ===
==== Section 1 ====
First Round
1	(India) J Gutta (India) A Ponnappa
BYE
(Australia) L Choo (Canada) R Honderich	21	21
(Canada) M Tong (Canada) J Wu	14	12
(Canada) E L O'Donoghue (Canada) K O'Donoghue
BYE
(Australia) S Mapasa (Australia) G Somerville	21	21
(Denmark) J Finne-Ipsen (Denmark) R S Hansen	16	14

Quarterfinals
1	(India) J Gutta (India) A Ponnappa
(Australia) L Choo (Canada) R Honderich	w	/	o
(Canada) E L O'Donoghue (Canada) K O'Donoghue	14	12
(Australia) S Mapasa (Australia) G Somerville	21	21

Semifinals
(Australia) L Choo (Canada) R Honderich
(Australia) S Mapasa (Australia) G Somerville

=== Bottom half ===
==== Section 2 ====
First Round
(Chinese Taipei) Hung Y-t (Chinese Taipei) Su H-l	21	7	21
(Canada) J Y Chen (Canada) C Choi	17	21	7
BYE
(India) M Jakkampudi (India) S P Ram
(Canada) P Chan (Canada) T Yi	21	17	23
(Sweden) C Nistad (Sweden) E Wengberg	13	21	21
BYE
2	(England) H Olver (England) L Smith

Second Round
(Chinese Taipei) Hung Y-t (Chinese Taipei) Su H-l	18	21	22
(India) M Jakkampudi (India) S P Ram	21	16	20
(Canada) P Chan (Canada) T Yi	20	15
2	(England) H Olver (England) L Smith	22	21

Quarterfinals
(Chinese Taipei) Hung Y-t (Chinese Taipei) Su H-l	12	10
2	(England) H Olver (England) L Smith	21	21

== Mixed doubles ==
=== Seeds ===
1. (Australia) Robin Middleton / Leanne Choo (semifinal)
2. (Republic of Ireland) Sam Magee / Chloe Magee (quarterfinal)
3. (Austria) David Obernosterer / Elisabeth Baldauf (second round)
4. (Sweden) Nico Ruponen / Amanda Hogstrom (final)

=== Finals ===
Semifinals
1	(Australia) Robin Middleton (Australia) Leanne Choo	18	17
4	(Sweden) Nico Ruponen (Sweden) Amanda Hogstrom	21	21
(Vietnam) Do Tuan Duc (Vietnam) Pham Nhu Thao	21	15	21
(Australia) Sawan Serasinghe (Australia) Setyana Mapasa	19	21	13

Final
4	(Sweden) Nico Ruponen (Sweden) Amanda Hogstrom	9	21	13
(Vietnam) Do Tuan Duc (Vietnam) Pham Nhu Thao	21	10	21

=== Top half ===
==== Section 1 ====
First Round
1	(Australia) R Middleton (Australia) L Choo
BYE
(Chinese Taipei) Liao C-h (Canada) P Chan	16	12
(Canada) A Dong (South Korea) Kim S-b	21	21
(India) A Dewalkar (India) J Gutta
BYE
(Vietnam) Duong B D (Vietnam) Vu T T	21	12	9
(Canada) T Ng (Canada) R Honderich	13	21	21

Second Round
1	(Australia) R Middleton (Australia) L Choo	23	11	21
(Canada) A Dong (South Korea) Kim S-b	21	21	13
(India) A Dewalkar (India) J Gutta
(Canada) T Ng (Canada) R Honderich	w	/	o

Quarterfinals
1	(Australia) R Middleton (Australia) L Choo	21	20	23
(Canada) T Ng (Canada) R Honderich	19	22	21

==== Section 2 ====
First Round
4	(Sweden) N Ruponen (Sweden) A Hogstrom
BYE
(Indonesia) J Wiratama (Canada) Q Ouyang	21	22	21
(Canada) J A Ho-Shue (Canada) O Lei	5	24	23
(Canada) J B T Lai (Canada) M Tong
BYE
(Canada) B C Holcek (Canada) E L O'Donoghue	13	14
(India) M Attri (India) A Ponnappa	21	21

Second Round
4	(Sweden) N Ruponen (Sweden) A Hogstrom	21	21	21
(Canada) J A Ho-Shue (Canada) O Lei	14	23	15
(Canada) J B T Lai (Canada) M Tong	14	12
(India) M Attri (India) A Ponnappa	21	21

Quarterfinals
4	(Sweden) N Ruponen (Sweden) A Hogstrom	w	/	o
(India) M Attri (India) A Ponnappa

=== Bottom half ===
==== Section 3 ====
First Round
(United States) Y T Chan (United States) Y Kawasaki	7	8
(Canada) N Osborne (Canada) J Wu	21	21
(Vietnam) Do T D (Vietnam) Pham N T	18	21	21
(Canada) A J Bauer (Canada) K O'Donoghue	21	15	11
(Indonesia) A Adistia (Canada) B Tam	21	21
(Canada) B. R. Sankeerth (Canada) C Rowe	13	16
BYE
3	(Austria) D Obernosterer (Austria) E Baldauf

Second Round
(Canada) N Osborne (Canada) J Wu	19	8
(Vietnam) Do T D (Vietnam) Pham N T	21	21
(Indonesia) A Adistia (Canada) B Tam	21	21
3	(Austria) D Obernosterer (Austria) E Baldauf	13	15

Quarterfinals
(Vietnam) Do T D (Vietnam) Pham N T	21	21
(Indonesia) A Adistia (Canada) B Tam	18	19

==== Section 4 ====
First Round
(Canada) N Yakura (Canada) T Yi	10	22	19
(Australia) S Serasinghe (Australia) S Mapasa	21	20	21
BYE
(Chinese Taipei) Kan C-y (Canada) J Y Chen
(Australia) M Chau (Australia) G Somerville	w	/	o
(India) P J Chopra (India) N S Reddy
BYE
2	(Republic of Ireland) S Magee (Republic of Ireland) C Magee

Second Round
(Australia) S Serasinghe (Australia) S Mapasa	21	21
(Chinese Taipei) Kan C-y (Canada) J Y Chen	12	10
(Australia) M Chau (Australia) G Somerville	15	13
2	(Republic of Ireland) S Magee (Republic of Ireland) C Magee	21	21

Quarterfinals
(Australia) S Serasinghe (Australia) S Mapasa	8	21	21
2	(Republic of Ireland) S Magee (Republic of Ireland) C Magee	21	16	15

Preceded by 2016 China Masters Grand Prix Gold	BWF Grand Prix and Grand Prix Gold; 2016 BWF Season	Succeeded by 2016 U.S. Open Grand Prix Gold
