= Badminton Australia =

Badminton association

- Sport: Badminton
- Jurisdiction: Australia
- Abbreviation: BA
- Founded: 1935
- Affiliation: BWF
- Affiliation date: 1936
- Regional affiliation: BOC
- Affiliation date: 1936
- Headquarters: Williamstown, Victoria
- President: Julie McDonald
- CEO: Tjitte Weistra

Official website
- www.badminton.org.au
- (Australia)

Badminton Australia (BA) is the top governing body for badminton in Australia. It is committed to promoting the awareness and development of badminton within Australia and is responsible for the management of international badminton relations and events. Badminton Australia also organises and runs junior events such as the June Bevan Teams Event or CP Maddern Trophy with their respective Australasian Championships, along with the Australian Closed Championships.

== History ==
Badminton has been played in Australia since the early 1900s, especially within Victoria. The Australian Badminton Association was formed in 1935, and shortly after Australia became the 11th member of the International Badminton Federation. In 1936, alongside New Zealand, it formed the Oceania Badminton Confederation (now known as Badminton Oceania).

The current national office for BA is located in Melbourne, Victoria.

== Achievements ==
Australia is not yet a competitive nation in the field of badminton due to the current Asian and European/Scandinavian dominance.

When commenting on Australian players at the 2008 Beijing Olympics, BA's Chief Executive Paul Brettell has said that "A bad draw will see [the Australian players] out after their first game" and that "Australia's greatest achievement is just qualifying for the event". These statements reflect the historical performance of badminton within Australia. For instance, badminton was one of just two Australian sports (the other being Rugby Sevens) not to win a medal at the 2006 Melbourne Commonwealth Games, and at the 2008 Olympics all Australians were knocked out of their respective first matches.

A notable exception to this trend was Anna Lao at the 1992 Barcelona Olympics, where she reached the quarterfinals in the women's singles, doubles and mixed and was overall ranked 5th in the world for each of those events. Another noticeable achievement is from Sze Yu, who was runner-up at the 1985 World Badminton Grand Prix, silver medallist in men's singles at the 1986 Commonwealth Games and also the winner of the 1988 U.S. Open Badminton Championships.

More recently, there appears to be a resurgence in Australian badminton with a strong performance at the 2012 London Olympics where Leanne Choo and Renuga Veeran reached the quarterfinals of the women's doubles event.

== See also ==
- Australian Paralympic Badminton Team
- Badminton World Federation
- Badminton Oceania
- Badminton Victoria
