= Hardianto =

Indonesian badminton player (born 1993)

Personal information
- Born: 28 February 1993 (age 33) Cilacap, Central Java, Indonesia
- Height: 1.79 m (5 ft 10 in)

Sport
- Country: Indonesia
- Sport: Badminton
- Handedness: Right

Men's doubles
- Highest ranking: 14 (with Berry Angriawan 18 January 2018)
- BWF profile
Medal record
Men's badminton
Representing Indonesia
SEA Games
| Gold medal – first place | 2017 Kuala Lumpur | Men's team |

Hardianto (born 28 February 1993) is an Indonesian badminton player affiliated with Mutiara Cardinal Bandung club.

== Career ==
In September 2023, Hardianto and his partner Ade Yusuf Santoso lost at the first round of Indonesia Masters Super 100 I from 8th seed Chinese Taipei pair Chen Zhi-ray and Lu Chen in straight games.

== Achievements ==
=== BWF World Tour (1 title, 2 runners-up) ===
The BWF World Tour, which was announced on 19 March 2017 and implemented in 2018, is a series of elite badminton tournaments sanctioned by the Badminton World Federation (BWF). The BWF World Tour is divided into levels of World Tour Finals, Super 1000, Super 750, Super 500, Super 300 (part of the HSBC World Tour), and the BWF Tour Super 100.

Men's doubles
| Year | Tournament | Level | Partner | Opponent | Score | Result | Ref. |
|---|---|---|---|---|---|---|---|
| 2018 | New Zealand Open | Super 300 | (Indonesia) Berry Angriawan | (Chinese Taipei) Chen Hung-ling (Chinese Taipei) Wang Chi-lin | 17–21, 17–21 | (silver) Runner-up | |
| 2018 | Australian Open | Super 300 | (Indonesia) Berry Angriawan | (Indonesia) Wahyu Nayaka (Indonesia) Ade Yusuf Santoso | 21–9, 9–21, 21–15 | (gold) Winner | |
| 2023 | Vietnam Open | Super 100 | (Indonesia) Ade Yusuf Santoso | (Japan) Kenya Mitsuhashi (Japan) Hiroki Okamura | 19–21, 19–21 | (silver) Runner-up | |

=== BWF Grand Prix (2 titles) ===
The BWF Grand Prix had two levels, the Grand Prix and Grand Prix Gold. It was a series of badminton tournaments sanctioned by the Badminton World Federation (BWF) and played between 2007 and 2017.

Men's doubles
| Year | Tournament | Partner | Opponent | Score | Result | Ref. |
|---|---|---|---|---|---|---|
| 2017 | Malaysia Masters | (Indonesia) Berry Angriawan | (Malaysia) Goh Sze Fei (Malaysia) Nur Izzuddin | 21–19, 21–12 | (gold) Winner | |
| 2017 | Thailand Open | (Indonesia) Berry Angriawan | (Germany) Raphael Beck (Germany) Peter Käsbauer | 21–16, 21–16 | (gold) Winner | |

BWF Grand Prix Gold tournament
BWF Grand Prix tournament

=== BWF International Challenge/Series (2 titles, 3 runners-up) ===
Men's doubles
| Year | Tournament | Partner | Opponent | Score | Result | Ref. |
|---|---|---|---|---|---|---|
| 2013 | Indonesia International | (Indonesia) Agripina Prima Rahmanto Putra | (Indonesia) Didit Juang Indrianto (Indonesia) Praveen Jordan | 21–17, 16–21, 21–23 | (silver) Runner-up | |
| 2015 | Singapore International | (Indonesia) Kenas Adi Haryanto | (Singapore) Terry Hee (Singapore) Loh Kean Hean | 21–13, 16–21, 19–21 | (silver) Runner-up | |
| 2015 | Vietnam International | (Indonesia) Kenas Adi Haryanto | (Indonesia) Hantoro (Indonesia) Rian Swastedian | 21–14, 21–14 | (gold) Winner | |
| 2016 | Polish Open | (Indonesia) Kenas Adi Haryanto | (Thailand) Kittinupong Kedren (Thailand) Dechapol Puavaranukroh | 21–5, 18–21, 21–15 | (gold) Winner | |
| 2016 | Orléans International | (Indonesia) Kenas Adi Haryanto | (Sweden) Richard Eidestedt (Sweden) Nico Ruponen | 21–13, 12–21, 19–21 | (silver) Runner-up | |

BWF International Challenge tournament
BWF International Series tournament

== Performance timeline ==
=== National team ===
- Senior level

| Team event | 2017 |
|---|---|
| SEA Games | G |

=== Individual competitions ===
==== Senior level ====
===== Men's doubles =====
| Event | 2018 |
|---|---|
| Asian Championships | 2R |

| Event | 2018 | 2019 |
|---|---|---|
| World Championships | 3R | 2R |

| Tournament | BWF Superseries / Grand Prix | | | | | | BWF World Tour | | | | | | | Best | Ref |
| Tournament | 2012 | 2013 | 2014 | 2015 | 2016 | 2017 | 2018 | 2019 | 2020 | 2021 | 2022 | 2023 | 2024 | Best | Ref |
|---|---|---|---|---|---|---|---|---|---|---|---|---|---|---|---|
| Malaysia Open | A | | | | | | 1R | 1R | NH | | A | | | 1R ('18, '19) | |
| India Open | A | | | | | 1R | A | | NH | | A | | | 1R ('17) | |
| Indonesia Masters | A | 1R | 2R | 2R | QF | NH | 2R | 2R | A | | | | | QF ('16) | |
| Thailand Masters | NH | | | | A | SF | SF | A | | NH | | A | | SF ('17, '18) | |
| All England Open | A | | | | | | | 1R | A | | | | | 1R ('19) | |
| Swiss Open | A | | | | | | | 2R | NH | A | | | | 2R ('19) | |
| Thailand Open | A | | NH | A | 2R | W | A | 1R | A | NH | A | | | W ('17) | |
| Malaysia Masters | A | 2R | 2R | A | | W | 2R | 2R | A | NH | A | | | W ('17) | |
| Singapore Open | A | | | | | SF | A | 1R | NH | | A | | | SF ('17) | |
| Indonesia Open | A | | | | 1R | 1R | QF | 1R | NH | A | | | | QF ('18) | |
| Australian Open | A | | | | | | W | 2R | NH | | A | | | W ('18) | |
| Japan Open | A | | | | | 1R | 2R | 1R | NH | | A | | | 2R ('18) | |
| Korea Open | A | | | | | 1R | A | | NH | | A | | | 1R ('17) | |
| Indonesia Masters Super 100 | N/A | | | | | | A | SF | NH | | A | 1R | SF | SF ('19, '24) | |
| Indonesia Masters Super 100 | N/A | | | | | | A | SF | NH | | A | A | | SF ('19, '24) | |
| Chinese Taipei Open | A | 2R | A | | QF | A | | | NH | | A | | | QF ('16) | |
| Vietnam Open | A | w/d | A | 1R | SF | A | | | NH | | 2R | F | A | F ('23) | |
| Hong Kong Open | A | | | | | 2R | 1R | A | NH | | | A | | 2R ('17) | |
| China Open | A | | | | | | 2R | A | NH | | | A | | 2R ('18) | |
| Macau Open | A | | | | SF | A | | | NH | | | | A | SF ('16) | |
| Denmark Open | A | | | | | 1R | 2R | A | | | | | | 2R ('18) | |
| Malaysia Super 100 | NH | | | | | | | | | | | QF | A | QF ('23) | |
| Korea Masters | A | 1R | A | | | | QF | A | NH | | A | | | QF ('18) | |
| China Masters | A | | | | 1R | SF | 1R | A | NH | | | A | | SF ('17) | |
| Syed Modi International | 1R | NH | A | | | SF | A | | NH | | A | | | SF ('17) | |
| Chinese Taipei Masters | NH | | | A | 2R | NH | | | | | | | | 2R ('16) | |
| Dutch Open | A | | | | | SF | QF | A | NH | N/A | | | | SF ('17) | |
| New Zealand Open | NH | A | SF | 1R | A | | F | A | NH | | | | | F (2018) | |
| Year-end Ranking | 212 | 86 | 164 | 63 | 27 | 16 | 18 | 42 | 55 | 74 | 414 | 136 | 233 | 14 | |
| Tournament | 2012 | 2013 | 2014 | 2015 | 2016 | 2017 | 2018 | 2019 | 2020 | 2021 | 2022 | 2023 | 2024 | Best | |

===== Mixed doubles =====
| Tournament | BWF Superseries / Grand Prix | | | | Best |
| Tournament | 2011 | 2012 | 2013 | 2014 | Best |
|---|---|---|---|---|---|
| Indonesia Masters | 1R | A | | 2R | 2R ('14) |
