= Lê Thu Huyền =

Vietnamese badminton player (born 1994)

Personal information
- Born: 2 June 1994 (age 32) Hanoi, Vietnam

Sport
- Country: Vietnam
- Sport: Badminton

Women's singles & doubles
- Highest ranking: 110 (WS 23 January 2014); 70 (WD 11 August 2016); 98 (XD 11 August 2016)
- BWF profile
Medal record
Women's badminton
Representing Vietnam
Asian Junior Championships
Bronze medal – third place	2012 Gimcheon	Mixed doubles

Lê Thu Huyền (born 2 June 1994) is a Vietnamese badminton player from Hanoi. She won a bronze medal at the 2012 Asian Junior Championships in Gimcheon, South Korea with her partner in mixed doubles Đỗ Tuấn Đức.

== Achievements ==
=== Asian Junior Championships ===
Mixed doubles
Year	Venue	Partner	Opponent	Score	Result
2012	Gimcheon Indoor Stadium; Gimcheon, South Korea	(Vietnam) Đỗ Tuấn Đức	(China) Wang Yilyu (China) Huang Dongping	9–21, 18–21	Bronze

=== BWF International Challenge/Series (3 titles, 1 runner-up) ===
Women's singles
Year	Tournament	Opponent	Score	Result
2011	Bangladesh International	(Sri Lanka) Achini Ratnasiri	11–21, 21–11, 16-21	(silver) Runner-up

Women's doubles
Year	Tournament	Partner	Opponent	Score	Result
2013	Auckland International	(Vietnam) Phạm Như Thảo	(England) Tracey Hallam (Australia) Renuga Veeran	14–21, 9–21	(silver) Runner-up
2015	Eurasia Bulgaria International	(Vietnam) Phạm Như Thảo	(France) Marie Batomene (France) Anne Tran	21–16, 21–9	(gold) Winner

Mixed doubles
Year	Tournament	Partner	Opponent	Score	Result
2011	Bangladesh International	(Vietnam) Lê Hà Anh	(Sri Lanka) Hasitha Chanaka (Sri Lanka) Thilini Jayasinghe	21–18, 21–15	(gold) Winner
2011	Kenya International	(Vietnam) Lê Hà Anh	(South Africa) Dorian James (South Africa) Michelle Edwards	23–25, 21–14, 21–19	(gold) Winner

BWF International Challenge tournament
BWF International Series tournament
BWF Future Series tournament
