= Nico Ruponen =

Swedish badminton player (born 1989)

Personal information
- Born: Nico Mikael Ruponen; 3 February 1989 (age 37) Täby, Stockholms län, Sweden
- Height: 1.85 m (6 ft 1 in)

Sport
- Country: Sweden
- Sport: Badminton
- Handedness: Left

Men's singles & doubles
- Highest ranking: 248 (MS 22 October 2009); 47 (MD 19 January 2017); 21 (XD 15 December 2016)
- BWF profile

Nico Mikael Ruponen (born 3 February 1989) is a Swedish badminton player. In 2012, he won the Kharkiv International in the mixed doubles event partnered with Amanda Högström. In 2016, he and Richard Eidestedt had to battle through the qualification round at the Orleans International tournament before reach the finals, finally they won the men's doubles title after beat Hardianto and Haryanto of Indonesia. He also became the runner-up at the 2016 Canada Open Grand Prix tournament in the mixed doubles event with Högström.

== Achievements ==
=== BWF Grand Prix ===
The BWF Grand Prix had two levels, the Grand Prix and Grand Prix Gold. It was a series of badminton tournaments sanctioned by the Badminton World Federation (BWF) and played between 2007 and 2017.

Mixed doubles
Year	Tournament	Partner	Opponent	Score	Result
2016	Canada Open	(Sweden) Amanda Högström	(Vietnam) Đỗ Tuấn Đức (Vietnam) Phạm Như Thảo	9–21, 21–10, 13–21	(silver) Runner-up

BWF Grand Prix Gold tournament
BWF Grand Prix tournament

=== BWF International Challenge/Series ===
Men's doubles
Year	Tournament	Partner	Opponent	Score	Result
2016	Orleans International	(Sweden) Richard Eidestedt	(Indonesia) Hardianto (Indonesia) Kenas Adi Haryanto	13–21, 21–12, 21–19	(gold) Winner
2016	Italian International	(Sweden) Richard Eidestedt	(Germany) Jones Ralfy Jansen (Germany) Josche Zurwonne	17–21, 18–21	(silver) Runner-up
2017	Swedish International	(Sweden) Richard Eidestedt	(Russia) Konstantin Abramov (Russia) Alexandr Zinchenko	17–21, 20–22	(silver) Runner-up

Mixed doubles
Year	Tournament	Partner	Opponent	Score	Result
2012	Kharkiv International	(Sweden) Amanda Högström	(France) Gaëtan Mittelheisser (France) Émilie Lefel	23-21, 10-21, 21-16	(gold) Winner
2014	Finnish Open	(Sweden) Amanda Högström	(Denmark) Anders Skaarup Rasmussen (Denmark) Lena Grebak	24-22, 19-21, 13-21	(silver) Runner-up

BWF International Challenge tournament
BWF International Series tournament
BWF Future Series tournament
