= Australian Paralympic Badminton Team =

Australia was represented by two athletes in the first Paralympic badminton competition at the 2020 Tokyo Paralympics.

== Medal tally ==
Games	Gold	Silver	Bronze	Total
2020 Tokyo	0	0	0	0
2024 Paris	0	0	0	0
Totals (2 entries)	0	0	0	0

== Summer Paralympic Games ==
=== 2020 Tokyo ===
Australia was represented by:

Women - Caitlin Dransfield
Men - Grant Manzoney
Officials - Team Manager - Ian Bridge

Detailed Australian Results

=== 2024 Paris ===
Australia was represented by:

Women - Mischa Ginns, Celine Vinot
Officials - Team Manager / Head Coach - Ian Bridge

Detailed Australian Results
