= Amanda Högström =

Swedish badminton player (born 1989)

Personal information
- Born: 8 August 1989 (age 37) Umeå, Sweden
- Height: 1.68 m (5 ft 6 in)

Sport
- Country: Sweden
- Sport: Badminton
- Handedness: Right

Women's & mixed doubles
- Highest ranking: 42 (WD 15 December 2011); 21 (XD 22 December 2016)
- BWF profile

Amanda Högström (born 8 August 1989) is a Swedish badminton player.

== Achievements ==
=== BWF Grand Prix ===
The BWF Grand Prix had two levels, the Grand Prix and Grand Prix Gold. It was a series of badminton tournaments sanctioned by the Badminton World Federation (BWF) and played between 2007 and 2017.

Mixed doubles
Year	Tournament	Partner	Opponent	Score	Result
2016	Canada Open	(Sweden) Nico Ruponen	(Vietnam) Đỗ Tuấn Đức (Vietnam) Phạm Như Thảo	9–21, 21–10, 13–21	(silver) Runner-up

BWF Grand Prix Gold tournament
BWF Grand Prix tournament

=== BWF International Challenge/Series ===
Women's doubles
Year	Tournament	Partner	Opponent	Score	Result
2018	Kharkiv International	(Sweden) Clara Nistad	(Estonia) Kristin Kuuba (Estonia) Kati-Kreet Marran	21–8, 21–11	(gold) Winner

Mixed doubles
Year	Tournament	Partner	Opponent	Score	Result
2010	Bulgarian International	(Estonia) Gert Künka	(Russia) Evgenij Dremin (Russia) Anastasia Russkikh	14–21, 24–26	(silver) Runner-up
2010	Italian International	(Estonia) Gert Künka	(England) Chris Adcock (Scotland) Imogen Bankier	14–21, 15–21	(silver) Runner-up
2011	Czech International	(Estonia) Gert Künka	(Russia) Aleksandr Nikolaenko (Russia) Valeria Sorokina	15–21, 12–21	(silver) Runner-up
2014	Kharkiv International	(Sweden) Nico Ruponen	(France) Gaëtan Mittelheisser (France) Émilie Lefel	23–21, 10–21, 21–16	(gold) Winner
2014	Finnish Open	(Sweden) Nico Ruponen	(Denmark) Anders Skaarup Rasmussen (Denmark) Lena Grebak	24–22, 19–21, 13–21	(silver) Runner-up
2017	Belgian International	(Republic of Ireland) Scott Evans	(Netherlands) Jacco Arends (Netherlands) Selena Piek	17–21, 9–21	(silver) Runner-up

BWF International Challenge tournament
BWF International Series tournament
BWF Future Series tournament
