= Richard Eidestedt =

English badminton player

Personal information
- Born: 20 June 1987 (age 39)

Sport
- Country: England; Sweden
- Sport: Badminton

Men's Doubles & Mixed Doubles
- Highest ranking: 29 (MD) 21 Jan 2010; 216 (XD) 26 Aug 2010
- BWF profile

Richard Eidestedt (born 20 June 1987) is an English male badminton player, and currently plays for Sweden. In 2008, he won the Irish, Le Volant d'Or, and Scotland International tournaments in the men's doubles event partnered with Andrew Ellis. In 2016, he and Nico Ruponen had to battle through the qualification round at the Orleans International tournament before reach the finals, finally they won the men's doubles title after beat Hardianto and Haryanto of Indonesia.

== Achievements ==
=== BWF International Challenge/Series ===
Men's Doubles
Year	Tournament	Partner	Opponent	Score	Result
2017	Swedish International	(Sweden) Nico Ruponen	(Russia) Konstantin Abramov (Russia) Alexandr Zinchenko	17-21, 20–22	(silver) Runner-up
2016	Italian International	(Sweden) Nico Ruponen	(Germany) Jones Ralfy Jansen (Germany) Josche Zurwonne	17-21, 18–21	(silver) Runner-up
2016	Orleans International	(Sweden) Nico Ruponen	(Indonesia) Hardianto (Indonesia) Kenas Adi Haryanto	13-21, 21–12, 21–19	(gold) Winner
2015	Norwegian International	(Sweden) Andy Hartono Tandaputra	(Denmark) Soren Gravholt (Denmark) Nikolaj Overgaard	21-23, 17–21	(silver) Runner-up
2008	Scotland International	(England) Andrew Ellis	(England) Chris Langridge (England) David Lindley	21-19 16-21 21–16	(gold) Winner
2008	Le Volant d'Or de Toulouse	(England) Andrew Ellis	(Belgium) Wouter Claes (Belgium) Frédéric Mawet	21-12, 21–12	(gold) Winner
2008	Irish International	(England) Andrew Ellis	(Denmark) Martin Delfs (Denmark) Morten Kronborg	21-13, 21–16	(gold) Winner
2007	Spanish Open	(England) Robin Middleton	(Denmark) Mathias Boe (Denmark) Carsten Mogensen	4-21, 10–21	(silver) Runner-up
2006	Welsh International	(England) Andrew Ellis	(Wales) Matthew Hughes (Wales) Martyn Lewis	9-21, 16–21	(silver) Runner-up

BWF International Challenge tournament
BWF International Series tournament
BWF Future Series tournament
