= Đỗ Tuấn Đức =

Vietnamese badminton player (born 1996)

Personal information
- Born: 6 February 1996 (age 30)

Sport
- Country: Vietnam
- Sport: Badminton

Men's & mixed doubles
- Highest ranking: 70 (MD 28 September 2017); 33 (XD 27 September 2018)
- BWF profile
Medal record
Men's badminton
Representing Vietnam
SEA Games
Bronze medal – third place	2021 Vietnam	Men's doubles
Asian Junior Championships
Bronze medal – third place	2012 Gimcheon	Mixed doubles

Đỗ Tuấn Đức (born 6 February 1996) is a Vietnamese badminton player from Hanoi. He was the bronze medalist at the Gimcheon, South Korea 2012 Asian Junior Championships in the mixed doubles event partnered with Lê Thu Huyền. Đỗ won his first BWF Grand Prix title at the 2016 Canada Open with his partner in the mixed doubles Phạm Như Thảo.

== Career ==
Đỗ and his men's doubles partner Phạm Hồng Nam competed at the 2021 SEA Games and won a bronze medal after a semifinal battle against Leo Rolly Carnando and Daniel Marthin of Indonesia.

== Achievements ==
=== SEA Games ===
Men's doubles
Year	Venue	Partner	Opponent	Score	Result
2021	Bac Giang Gymnasium; Bắc Giang, Vietnam	(Vietnam) Phạm Hồng Nam	(Indonesia) Leo Rolly Carnando (Indonesia) Daniel Marthin	20–22, 16–21	Bronze

=== Asian Junior Championships ===
Mixed doubles
Year	Venue	Partner	Opponent	Score	Result
2012	Gimcheon Indoor Stadium; Gimcheon, South Korea	(Vietnam) Lê Thu Huyền	(China) Wang Yilyu (China) Huang Dongping	9–21, 18–21	Bronze

=== BWF Grand Prix (1 title) ===
The BWF Grand Prix had two levels, the Grand Prix and Grand Prix Gold. It was a series of badminton tournaments sanctioned by the Badminton World Federation (BWF) and played between 2007 and 2017.

Mixed doubles
Year	Tournament	Partner	Opponent	Score	Result
2016	Canada Open	(Vietnam) Phạm Như Thảo	(Sweden) Nico Ruponen (Sweden) Amanda Högström	21–9, 10–21, 21–13	(gold) Winner

BWF Grand Prix Gold tournament
BWF Grand Prix tournament

=== BWF International Challenge/Series (4 titles, 4 runners-up) ===
Men's doubles
Year	Tournament	Partner	Opponent	Score	Result
2013	Hellas International	(Vietnam) Phạm Hồng Nam	(Russia) Nikolaj Nikolaenko (Russia) Nikolai Ukk	14–21, 16–21	(silver) Runner-up
2015	Slovak Open	(Vietnam) Nguyễn Ngọc Mạnh	(England) Darren Adamson (England) Scott Sankey	21–14, 21–18	(gold) Winner
2016	Portugal International	(Vietnam) Phạm Hồng Nam	(Malaysia) Ong Yew Sin (Malaysia) Teo Ee Yi	17–21, 22–24	(silver) Runner-up
2016	Vietnam International Series	(Vietnam) Phạm Hồng Nam	(Malaysia) Goh Sze Fei (Malaysia) Nur Izzuddin	17–21, 21–19, 22–20	(gold) Winner

Mixed doubles
Year	Tournament	Partner	Opponent	Score	Result
2015	Eurasia Bulgaria International	(Vietnam) Phạm Như Thảo	(Denmark) Alexander Bond (Denmark) Ditte Søby Hansen	Walkover	(gold) Winner
2015	Slovak Open	(Vietnam) Phạm Như Thảo	(England) Ben Lane (England) Jessica Pugh	21–18, 13–21, 12–21	(silver) Runner-up
2016	Portugal International	(Vietnam) Phạm Như Thảo	(Denmark) Mikkel Mikkelsen (Denmark) Mai Surrow	19–21, 21–17, 19–21	(silver) Runner-up
2018	Vietnam International	(Vietnam) Phạm Như Thảo	(Russia) Evgenij Dremin (Russia) Evgenia Dimova	20–22, 24–22, 21–15	(gold) Winner

BWF International Challenge tournament
BWF International Series tournament
BWF Future Series tournament
