= Phạm Như Thảo =

Vietnamese badminton player (born 1996)

Personal information
- Born: 30 May 1996 (age 30)

Sport
- Country: Vietnam
- Sport: Badminton

Women's & mixed doubles
- Highest ranking: 66 (WD 10 November 2016); 33 (XD 27 September 2018)
- Current ranking: 74 (XD 30 March 2021)
- BWF profile
Medal record
Women's badminton
Representing Vietnam
SEA Games
Bronze medal – third place	2021 Vietnam	Women's team

Phạm Như Thảo (born 30 May 1996) is a badminton player from Vietnam. She won her first senior title at the 2014 Vietnam International Series in the mixed doubles event. At the 2015 Eurasia Bulgaria International, Phạm clinched two titles in the women's and mixed doubles event. Phạm won the BWF Grand Prix tournament, at the 2016 Canada Open with her partner in the mixed doubles Đỗ Tuấn Đức.

== Achievements ==
=== BWF Grand Prix ===
Mixed doubles
Year	Tournament	Partner	Opponent	Score	Result
2016	Canada Open	(Vietnam) Đỗ Tuấn Đức	(Sweden) Nico Ruponen (Sweden) Amanda Högström	21–9, 10–21, 21–13	(gold) Winner

BWF Grand Prix Gold tournament
BWF Grand Prix tournament

=== BWF International Challenge/Series ===
Women's doubles
Year	Tournament	Partner	Opponent	Score	Result
2013	Auckland International	(Vietnam) Lê Thu Huyền	(England) Tracey Hallam (Australia) Renuga Veeran	14–21, 9–21	(silver) Runner-up
2015	Eurasia Bulgaria International	(Vietnam) Lê Thu Huyền	(France) Marie Batomene (France) Anne Tran	21–16, 21–9	(gold) Winner

Mixed doubles
Year	Tournament	Partner	Opponent	Score	Result
2014	Vietnam International Series	(Vietnam) Đào Mạnh Thắng	(Malaysia) Tan Chee Tean (Malaysia) Shevon Jemie Lai	21–14, 21–11	(gold) Winner
2015	Eurasia Bulgaria International	(Vietnam) Đỗ Tuấn Đức	(Denmark) Alexander Bond (Denmark) Ditte Søby Hansen	Walkover	(gold) Winner
2015	Slovak Open	(Vietnam) Đỗ Tuấn Đức	(England) Ben Lane (England) Jessica Pugh	21–18, 13–21, 12–21	(silver) Runner-up
2016	Portugal International	(Vietnam) Đỗ Tuấn Đức	(Denmark) Mikkel Mikkelsen (Denmark) Mai Surrow	19–21, 21–17, 19–21	(silver) Runner-up
2018	Vietnam International	(Vietnam) Đỗ Tuấn Đức	(Russia) Evgenij Dremin (Russia) Evgenia Dimova	20–22, 24–22, 21–15	(gold) Winner

BWF International Challenge tournament
BWF International Series tournament
BWF Future Series tournament
