= 2021 Hylo Open =

2021 badminton tournament in Saarlandhalle

Tournament details
- Dates: 2–7 November
- Level: Super 500
- Total prize money: US$320,000
- Venue: Saarlandhalle
- Location: Saarbrücken, Germany

Champions
- Men's singles: (Singapore) Loh Kean Yew
- Women's singles: (Thailand) Busanan Ongbamrungphan
- Men's doubles: (Indonesia) Marcus Fernaldi Gideon (Indonesia) Kevin Sanjaya Sukamuljo
- Women's doubles: (Japan) Chisato Hoshi (Japan) Aoi Matsuda
- Mixed doubles: (Thailand) Dechapol Puavaranukroh (Thailand) Sapsiree Taerattanachai

The 2021 Hylo Open was a badminton tournament which took place at the Saarlandhalle in Saarbrücken, Germany, from 2 to 7 November 2021 with a total prize of US$320,000.

In 2021, the tournament changed its name from SaarLorLux Open to Hylo Open and was upgraded from a Super 100 tournament to a Super 500.

== Tournament ==
The 2021 Hylo Open was the seventh tournament as the only planned Super 500 tournament of the 2021 BWF World Tour as many tournaments got canceled due to the COVID-19 pandemic. It was a part of the Hylo Open, which had been held since 1988. The tournament was organized by the local organizer with sanction from the BWF.

=== Venue ===
This international tournament was held at Saarlandhalle in Saarbrücken, Germany.

=== Point distribution ===
Below is the point distribution table for each phase of the tournament based on the BWF points system for the BWF World Tour Super 500 event.

| Winner | Runner-up | 3/4 | 5/8 | 9/16 | 17/32 |
|---|---|---|---|---|---|
| 9,200 | 7,800 | 6,420 | 5,040 | 3,600 | 2,220 |

=== Prize money ===
The total prize money for this tournament was US$320,000. The distribution of the prize money was in accordance with BWF regulations.

| Event | Winner | Finalist | Semi-finals | Quarter-finals | Last 16 |
| Singles | $24,000 | $12,160 | $4,640 | $1,920 | $1,120 |
| Doubles | $25,280 | $12,160 | $4,480 | $2,320 | $1,200 |

== Men's singles ==
=== Seeds ===
1. (Chinese Taipei) Chou Tien-chen (first round)
2. (Malaysia) Lee Zii Jia (final)
3. (Hong Kong) Ng Ka Long (quarter-finals)
4. (Chinese Taipei) Wang Tzu-wei (second round)
5. (Denmark) Rasmus Gemke (quarter-finals)
6. (India) Srikanth Kidambi (semi-finals)
7. (Hong Kong) Lee Cheuk Yiu (second round)
8. (Thailand) Kantaphon Wangcharoen (quarter-finals)

=== Finals ===
Semi-finals
(Singapore) Loh Kean Yew | 21 | 21
(India) Lakshya Sen | 18 | 12
6 | (India) Srikanth Kidambi | 19 | 20
2 | (Malaysia) Lee Zii Jia | 21 | 22

Final
(Singapore) Loh Kean Yew | 19 | 21 | 17
2 | (Malaysia) Lee Zii Jia | 21 | 13 | 12^{r}

=== Top half ===
==== Section 1 ====
First Round
1 | (Chinese Taipei) Chou T-c | 18 | 13
(Singapore) Loh K Y | 21 | 21
(Israel) M Zilberman | 17 | 18
(France) T J Popov | 21 | 21
5 | (Denmark) R Gemke | 21 | 19 | 21
PFR | (India) A Jayaram | 14 | 21 | 16
(Brazil) Y Coelho | 15 | 14
(Japan) K Naraoka | 21 | 21

Second Round
(Singapore) Loh K Y | 21 | 11 | 21
(France) T J Popov | 15 | 21 | 15
5 | (Denmark) R Gemke | 19 | 22 | 21
(Japan) K Naraoka | 21 | 20 | 9

Quarter-finals
(Singapore) Loh K Y | 21 | 19 | 22
5 | (Denmark) R Gemke | 11 | 21 | 20

==== Section 2 ====
First Round
4 | (Chinese Taipei) Wang T-w | 21 | 21
(Sweden) F Burestedt | 17 | 9
(India) L Sen | 21 | 21
(France) T Rouxel | 17 | 14
7 | (Hong Kong) Lee C Y | 21 | 22
(Malaysia) Liew D | 17 | 20
(Thailand) K Vitidsarn | 21 | 26 | 21
PFR | (Denmark) V Svendsen | 8 | 28 | 16

Second Round
4 | (Chinese Taipei) Wang T-w | 17 | 15
(India) L Sen | 21 | 21
7 | (Hong Kong) Lee C Y | 17 | 19
(Thailand) K Vitidsarn | 21 | 21

Quarter-finals
(India) L Sen | 21 | 12 | 21
(Thailand) K Vitidsarn | 18 | 21 | 19

=== Bottom half ===
==== Section 3 ====
First Round
(India) S Dey | 11 | 16
(South Korea) Lee D-k | 21 | 21
(Japan) K Watanabe | 15 | 10
6 | (India) S Kidambi | 21 | 21
(Indonesia) T Sugiarto | 21 | 21
PFR | (Spain) L E Peñalver | 16 | 14
(France) B Leverdez | 13 | 21
3 | (Hong Kong) Ng K L | 21 | 23

Second Round
(South Korea) Lee D-k | 9 | 21 | 10
6 | (India) S Kidambi | 21 | 19 | 21
(Indonesia) T Sugiarto | 20 | 16
3 | (Hong Kong) Ng K L | 22 | 21

Quarter-finals
6 | (India) S Kidambi | 21 | 12 | 21
3 | (Hong Kong) Ng K L | 11 | 21 | 19

==== Section 4 ====
First Round
(Germany) M Weißkirchen
(India) So Verma | w | / | o
(Canada) B Yang | 12 | 18
8 | (Thailand) K Wangcharoen | 21 | 21
(Republic of Ireland) N Nguyen | 16 | 21 | 21
(India) Prannoy K | 21 | 17 | 7
(Spain) P Abián | 11 | 23 | 22
2 | (Malaysia) Lee Z J | 21 | 21 | 24

Second Round
(India) So Verma | 13 | 10
8 | (Thailand) K Wangcharoen | 21 | 21
(Republic of Ireland) N Nguyen | 20 | 16
2 | (Malaysia) Lee Z J | 22 | 21

Quarter-finals
8 | (Thailand) K Wangcharoen | 13 | 20
2 | (Malaysia) Lee Z J | 21 | 22

== Women's singles ==
=== Seeds ===
1. (Thailand) Ratchanok Intanon (second round)
2. (Thailand) Pornpawee Chochuwong (second round)
3. (Canada) Michelle Li (semi-finals)
4. (Denmark) Mia Blichfeldt (withdrew)
5. (Thailand) Busanan Ongbamrungphan (champion)
6. (Indonesia) Gregoria Mariska Tunjung (second round)
7. (Germany) Yvonne Li (first round)
8. (Scotland) Kirsty Gilmour (first round)

=== Finals ===
Semi-finals
(Singapore) Yeo Jia Min | 21 | 23 | 21
3 | (Canada) Michelle Li | 12 | 25 | 12
5 | (Thailand) Busanan Ongbamrungphan | 16 | 21 | 21
(Thailand) Phittayaporn Chaiwan | 21 | 17 | 18

Final
(Singapore) Yeo Jia Min | 10 | 14
5 | (Thailand) Busanan Ongbamrungphan | 21 | 21

=== Top half ===
==== Section 1 ====
First Round
1 | (Thailand) R Intanon | 21 | 21
PFR | (Switzerland) J Stadelmann | 9 | 10
PFR | (Czech Republic) K Tomalová | 8 | 10
(Belgium) L Tan | 21 | 21
6 | (Indonesia) G M Tunjung | 21 | 21
(Japan) S Kawakami | 16 | 18
(Chinese Taipei) Pai Y-p | 7 | 11
(Singapore) Yeo J M | 21 | 21

Second Round
1 | (Thailand) R Intanon | 15 | 21 | 6^{r}
(Belgium) L Tan | 21 | 7 | 11
6 | (Indonesia) G M Tunjung | 19 | 17
(Singapore) Yeo J M | 21 | 21

Quarter-finals
(Belgium) L Tan | 21 | 9 | 18
(Singapore) Yeo J M | 14 | 21 | 21

==== Section 2 ====
First Round
3 | (Canada) M Li | 21 | 21
(Slovakia) M Repiská | 11 | 12
(Thailand) S Katethong | 21 | 21
(Russia) N Perminova | 14 | 12
8 | (Scotland) K Gilmour | 19 | 15
(Turkey) A Demirbağ | 21 | 21
PFR | (India) S K P Kudaravalli | 18 | 14
(Ukraine) M Ulitina | 21 | 21

Second Round
3 | (Canada) M Li | 21 | 21
(Thailand) S Katethong | 16 | 10
(Turkey) A Demirbağ | 21 | 21
(Ukraine) M Ulitina | 13 | 17

Quarter-finals
3 | (Canada) M Li | 21 | 21
(Turkey) A Demirbağ | 14 | 18

=== Bottom half ===
==== Section 3 ====
First Round
(Spain) B Corrales | 21 | 21
(France) L Huet | 15 | 11
(Indonesia) R Hartawan | 7 | 14
5 | (Thailand) B Ongbamrungphan | 21 | 21
(Estonia) K Kuuba | 21 | 21
(Poland) J Hart | 18 | 10
(Turkey) N Yiğit | 21 | 23
PFR | (India) A Kashyap | 7 | 21

Second Round
(Spain) B Corrales | 10 | 18
5 | (Thailand) B Ongbamrungphan | 21 | 21
(Estonia) K Kuuba | 12 | 21 | 13
(Turkey) N Yiğit | 21 | 19 | 21

Quarter-finals
5 | (Thailand) B Ongbamrungphan | 21 | 21
(Turkey) N Yiğit | 15 | 18

==== Section 4 ====
First Round
(France) Y Hoyaux | 25 | 21 | 10
(Denmark) L Kjærsfeldt | 27 | 18 | 21
(United States) I Wang | 19 | 21 | 21
7 | (Germany) Y Li | 21 | 11 | 18
(Thailand) P Chaiwan | 21 | 21
(France) M Batomene | 10 | 17
(Denmark) J D Jakobsen | 10 | 15
2 | (Thailand) P Chochuwong | 21 | 21

Second Round
(Denmark) L Kjærsfeldt | 21 | 21
(United States) I Wang | 12 | 15
(Thailand) P Chaiwan | 21 | 21
2 | (Thailand) P Chochuwong | 12 | 16

Quarter-finals
(Denmark) L Kjærsfeldt | 21 | 17 | 13
(Thailand) P Chaiwan | 15 | 21 | 21

== Men's doubles ==
=== Seeds ===
1. (Indonesia) Marcus Fernaldi Gideon / Kevin Sanjaya Sukamuljo (champions)
2. (Indonesia) Mohammad Ahsan / Hendra Setiawan (quarter-finals)
3. (Indonesia) Fajar Alfian / Muhammad Rian Ardianto (quarter-finals)
4. (Denmark) Kim Astrup / Anders Skaarup Rasmussen (withdrew)
5. (Malaysia) Ong Yew Sin / Teo Ee Yi (first round)
6. (England) Ben Lane / Sean Vendy (quarter-finals)
7. (Germany) Mark Lamsfuß / Marvin Seidel (first round)
8. (Chinese Taipei) Lu Ching-yao / Yang Po-han (second round)

=== Finals ===
Semi-finals
1 | (Indonesia) Marcus Fernaldi Gideon (Indonesia) Kevin Sanjaya Sukamuljo | 21 | 21
(Thailand) Supak Jomkoh (Thailand) Kittinupong Kedren | 17 | 16
(Indonesia) Pramudya Kusumawardana (Indonesia) Yeremia Rambitan | 17 | 13
(Indonesia) Leo Rolly Carnando (Indonesia) Daniel Marthin | 21 | 21

Final
1 | (Indonesia) Marcus Fernaldi Gideon (Indonesia) Kevin Sanjaya Sukamuljo | 21 | 21
(Indonesia) Leo Rolly Carnando (Indonesia) Daniel Marthin | 14 | 19

=== Top half ===
==== Section 1 ====
First Round
1 | (Indonesia) M F Gideon (Indonesia) K S Sukamuljo | 21 | 21
(Japan) H Okamura (Japan) M Onodera | 17 | 19
(Republic of Ireland) J Magee (Republic of Ireland) P Reynolds | 26 | 22
(Netherlands) R Jille (Netherlands) T van der Lecq | 28 | 24
7 | (Germany) M Lamsfuß (Germany) M Seidel | 19 | 22
(Scotland) C Grimley (Scotland) M Grimley | 21 | 24
(Denmark) D Lundgaard (Denmark) M Thyrri | 21 | 21
PFR | (India) T Kona (India) S Sharma | 16 | 18

Second Round
1 | (Indonesia) M F Gideon (Indonesia) K S Sukamuljo | 23 | 21
(Netherlands) R Jille (Netherlands) T van der Lecq | 21 | 18
(Scotland) C Grimley (Scotland) M Grimley | 20 | 14
(Denmark) D Lundgaard (Denmark) M Thyrri | 22 | 21

Quarter-finals
1 | (Indonesia) M F Gideon (Indonesia) K S Sukamuljo | 21 | 21
(Denmark) D Lundgaard (Denmark) M Thyrri | 14 | 15

==== Section 2 ====
First Round
PFR | (Thailand) N Trinkajee (Thailand) T Viriyangkura | 17 | 13
(South Korea) Ko S-h (South Korea) Shin B-c | 21 | 21
(France) C Popov (France) T J Popov | 15 | 19
(Thailand) S Jomkoh (Thailand) K Kedren | 21 | 21
6 | (England) B Lane (England) S Vendy | 21 | 21
(India) M Attri (India) B. S Reddy | 9 | 11
(France) F Delrue (France) W Villeger | 9 | 17
(Indonesia) M S Fikri (Indonesia) B Maulana | 21 | 21

Second Round
(South Korea) Ko S-h (South Korea) Shin B-c | 4^{r}
(Thailand) S Jomkoh (Thailand) K Kedren | 5
6 | (England) B Lane (England) S Vendy | 21 | 21
(Indonesia) M S Fikri (Indonesia) B Maulana | 14 | 15

Quarter-finals
(Thailand) S Jomkoh (Thailand) K Kedren | 21 | 20 | 21
6 | (England) B Lane (England) S Vendy | 18 | 22 | 18

=== Bottom half ===
==== Section 3 ====
First Round
(Chinese Taipei) Lee J-h (Chinese Taipei) Yang P-hs | 17 | 21 | 12
(Indonesia) P Kusumawardana (Indonesia) Y Rambitan | 21 | 18 | 21
(Malaysia) Goh V S (Malaysia) Low J S | 21 | 19 | 15
8 | (Chinese Taipei) Lu C-y (Chinese Taipei) Yang P-ha | 19 | 21 | 21
(England) C Hemming (England) S Stallwood | 21 | 21
(Denmark) M Boe (Denmark) M Sarfelt | 6 | 17
(France) L Corvée (France) R Labar | 18 | 11
3 | (Indonesia) F Alfian (Indonesia) M R Ardianto | 21 | 21

Second Round
(Indonesia) P Kusumawardana (Indonesia) Y Rambitan | 25 | 14 | 21
8 | (Chinese Taipei) Lu C-y (Chinese Taipei) Yang P-ha | 23 | 21 | 19
(England) C Hemming (England) S Stallwood | 16 | 19
3 | (Indonesia) F Alfian (Indonesia) M R Ardianto | 21 | 21

Quarter-finals
(Indonesia) P Kusumawardana (Indonesia) Y Rambitan | 21 | 25
3 | (Indonesia) F Alfian (Indonesia) M R Ardianto | 11 | 23

==== Section 4 ====
First Round
(England) M Clare (England) E Van Leeuwen | 18 | 15
(Scotland) A Dunn (Scotland) A Hall | 21 | 21
(Indonesia) L R Carnando (Indonesia) D Marthin | 21 | 21
5 | (Malaysia) Ong Y S (Malaysia) Teo E Y | 12 | 19
(Malaysia) Tan K M (Malaysia) Tan W K | 21 | 21
(Japan) T Inoue (Japan) K Mitsuhashi | 10 | 15
(Japan) M Kaneko (Japan) Y Kubota | 15 | 18
2 | (Indonesia) M Ahsan (Indonesia) H Setiawan | 21 | 21

Second Round
(Scotland) A Dunn (Scotland) A Hall | 16 | 11
(Indonesia) L R Carnando (Indonesia) D Marthin | 21 | 21
(Malaysia) Tan K M (Malaysia) Tan W K | 14 | 18
2 | (Indonesia) M Ahsan (Indonesia) H Setiawan | 21 | 21

Quarter-finals
(Indonesia) L R Carnando (Indonesia) D Marthin | 22 | 21
2 | (Indonesia) M Ahsan (Indonesia) H Setiawan | 20 | 17

== Women's doubles ==
=== Seeds ===
1. (Thailand) Jongkolphan Kititharakul / Rawinda Prajongjai (semi-finals)
2. (Bulgaria) Gabriela Stoeva / Stefani Stoeva (first round)
3. (England) Chloe Birch / Lauren Smith (first round)
4. (Denmark) Maiken Fruergaard / Sara Thygesen (first round)
5. (Thailand) Puttita Supajirakul / Sapsiree Taerattanachai (quarter-finals)
6. (Denmark) Amalie Magelund / Freja Ravn (withdrew)
7. (India) Ashwini Ponnappa / N. Sikki Reddy (second round)
8. (Chinese Taipei) Hsu Ya-ching / Hu Ling-fang (first round)

=== Finals ===
Semi-finals
1 | (Thailand) Jongkolphan Kititharakul (Thailand) Rawinda Prajongjai | 21 | 21 | 19
(Japan) Chisato Hoshi (Japan) Aoi Matsuda | 14 | 23 | 21
(Japan) Rin Iwanaga (Japan) Kie Nakanishi | 21 | 21
(Indonesia) Siti Fadia Silva Ramadhanti (Indonesia) Ribka Sugiarto | 17 | 16

Final
(Japan) Chisato Hoshi (Japan) Aoi Matsuda | 22 | 21
(Japan) Rin Iwanaga (Japan) Kie Nakanishi | 20 | 18

=== Top half ===
==== Section 1 ====
First Round
(Chinese Taipei) Chang C-h (Chinese Taipei) Lee C-c | 17 | 18
(Thailand) B Aimsaard (Thailand) N Aimsaard | 21 | 21
8 | (Chinese Taipei) Hsu Y-c (Chinese Taipei) Hu L-f | 17 | 22 | 13
(Netherlands) D Jille (Netherlands) C Seinen | 21 | 20 | 21
(Scotland) J MacPherson (Scotland) C Torrance | 21 | 21
(Republic of Ireland) K Frost (Republic of Ireland) M Ryan | 13 | 9

Second Round
1 | (Thailand) J Kititharakul (Thailand) R Prajongjai | 26 | 30
(Thailand) B Aimsaard (Thailand) N Aimsaard | 24 | 28
(Netherlands) D Jille (Netherlands) C Seinen | 21 | 17 | 21
(Scotland) J MacPherson (Scotland) C Torrance | 7 | 21 | 15

Quarter-finals
1 | (Thailand) J Kititharakul (Thailand) R Prajongjai | 21 | 21
(Netherlands) D Jille (Netherlands) C Seinen | 15 | 9

==== Section 2 ====
First Round
3 | (England) C Birch (England) L Smith | 23 | 18
(Japan) C Hoshi (Japan) A Matsuda | 25 | 21
(Estonia) K-K Marran (Estonia) H Rüütel | 9 | 18
(France) M Lambert (France) A Tran | 21 | 21
7 | (India) A Ponnappa (India) N. S Reddy | 21 | 21
(Ukraine) M Stoliarenko (Ukraine) Y Zharka | 8 | 13
(Indonesia) N V Marwah (Indonesia) P Syaikah | 21 | 21
(Luxembourg) K Schmidt (Luxembourg) Z Sinico | 6 | 5

Second Round
(Japan) C Hoshi (Japan) A Matsuda | 17 | 21 | 21
(France) M Lambert (France) A Tran | 21 | 7 | 19
7 | (India) A Ponnappa (India) N. S Reddy | 15 | 16
(Indonesia) N V Marwah (Indonesia) P Syaikah | 21 | 21

Quarter-finals
(Japan) C Hoshi (Japan) A Matsuda | 21 | 21
(Indonesia) N V Marwah (Indonesia) P Syaikah | 16 | 9

=== Bottom half ===
==== Section 3 ====
First Round
(Spain) C Azurmendi (Spain) B Corrales
(Germany) L Efler (Germany) I Lohau | w | / | o
(Denmark) J Finne-Ipsen (Denmark) M Surrow | w | / | o
6 | (Denmark) A Magelund (Denmark) F Ravn
(Netherlands) A Tirtosentono (Netherlands) I van der Aar | 19 | 8
(England) J Moore (Australia) G Somerville | 21 | 21
(Japan) R Iwanaga (Japan) K Nakanishi | 22 | 21
4 | (Denmark) M Fruergaard (Denmark) S Thygesen | 20 | 19

Second Round
(Germany) L Efler (Germany) I Lohau | 23 | 21
(Denmark) J Finne-Ipsen (Denmark) M Surrow | 21 | 9
(England) J Moore (Australia) G Somerville | 12 | 6
(Japan) R Iwanaga (Japan) K Nakanishi | 21 | 21

Quarter-finals
(Germany) L Efler (Germany) I Lohau | 15 | 16
(Japan) R Iwanaga (Japan) K Nakanishi | 21 | 21

==== Section 4 ====
First Round
(Denmark) A Bøje (Denmark) M Poulsen | 23 | 18 | 17
(Malaysia) V Hoo K M (Malaysia) Lim C S | 21 | 21 | 21
(England) J Hopton (England) J Pugh | 13 | 13
5 | (Thailand) P Supajirakul (Thailand) S Taerattanachai | 21 | 21
(Switzerland) A Müller (Switzerland) J Stadelmann | 17 | 2^{r}
(Denmark) N P Anthonisen (Denmark) C Graversen | 21 | 7
(Indonesia) S F S Ramadhanti (Indonesia) R Sugiarto | 21 | 21
2 | (Bulgaria) G Stoeva (Bulgaria) S Stoeva | 9 | 16

Second Round
(Malaysia) V Hoo K M (Malaysia) Lim C S | 8 | 6
5 | (Thailand) P Supajirakul (Thailand) S Taerattanachai | 21 | 21
(Denmark) N P Anthonisen (Denmark) C Graversen | 5 | 11
(Indonesia) S F S Ramadhanti (Indonesia) R Sugiarto | 21 | 21

Quarter-finals
5 | (Thailand) P Supajirakul (Thailand) S Taerattanachai | 21 | 22 | 16
(Indonesia) S F S Ramadhanti (Indonesia) R Sugiarto | 15 | 24 | 21

== Mixed doubles ==
=== Seeds ===
1. (Thailand) Dechapol Puavaranukroh / Sapsiree Taerattanachai (champions)
2. (Indonesia) Praveen Jordan / Melati Daeva Oktavianti (final)
3. (England) Marcus Ellis / Lauren Smith (second round)
4. (Malaysia) Chan Peng Soon / Goh Liu Ying (first round)
5. (Indonesia) Hafiz Faizal / Gloria Emanuelle Widjaja (quarter-finals)
6. (France) Thom Gicquel / Delphine Delrue (withdrew)
7. (Hong Kong) Tang Chun Man / Tse Ying Suet (first round)
8. (Malaysia) Tan Kian Meng / Lai Pei Jing (first round)

=== Finals ===
Semi-finals
1 | (Thailand) Dechapol Puavaranukroh (Thailand) Sapsiree Taerattanachai | 22 | 21
(Indonesia) Rinov Rivaldy (Indonesia) Pitha Haningtyas Mentari | 20 | 14
(Thailand) Supak Jomkoh (Thailand) Supissara Paewsampran | 18 | 19
2 | (Indonesia) Praveen Jordan (Indonesia) Melati Daeva Oktavianti | 21 | 21

Final
1 | (Thailand) Dechapol Puavaranukroh (Thailand) Sapsiree Taerattanachai | 22 | 21
2 | (Indonesia) Praveen Jordan (Indonesia) Melati Daeva Oktavianti | 20 | 14

=== Top half ===
==== Section 1 ====
First Round
1 | (Thailand) D Puavaranukroh (Thailand) S Taerattanachai | 21 | 21
(Netherlands) R Tabeling (Netherlands) S Piek | 15 | 16
(New Zealand) O Leydon-Davis (New Zealand) A Pak | 15 | 15
(Malaysia) Hoo P R (Malaysia) Cheah Y S | 21 | 21
5 | (Indonesia) H Faizal (Indonesia) G E Widjaja | 21 | 21
(Scotland) A Hall (Scotland) J MacPherson | 17 | 11
(Thailand) T Viriyangkura (Thailand) B Aimsaard | 18 | 20
(Denmark) J Bay (Denmark) S Lundgaard | 21 | 22

Second Round
1 | (Thailand) D Puavaranukroh (Thailand) S Taerattanachai | 21 | 21
(Malaysia) Hoo P R (Malaysia) Cheah Y S | 10 | 19
5 | (Indonesia) H Faizal (Indonesia) G E Widjaja | 21 | 21
(Denmark) J Bay (Denmark) S Lundgaard | 11 | 17

Quarter-finals
1 | (Thailand) D Puavaranukroh (Thailand) S Taerattanachai | 20 | 21 | 21
5 | (Indonesia) H Faizal (Indonesia) G E Widjaja | 22 | 16 | 16

==== Section 2 ====
First Round
4 | (Malaysia) Chan P S (Malaysia) Goh L Y | 20 | 21 | 16
(Denmark) M Mikkelsen (Denmark) R Søby Hansen | 22 | 15 | 21
(Indonesia) R Rivaldy (Indonesia) P H Mentari | 21 | 21
(England) C Hemming (England) J Pugh | 19 | 18
PFR | (Netherlands) R Jille (Netherlands) C Seinen | 14 | 15
(Malaysia) Goh S H (Malaysia) S J Lai | 21 | 21
(India) B. S. Reddy (India) A Ponnappa | 12 | 13
(Denmark) N Nøhr (Denmark) A Magelund | 21 | 21

Second Round
(Denmark) M Mikkelsen (Denmark) R Søby Hansen | 19 | 20
(Indonesia) R Rivaldy (Indonesia) P H Mentari | 21 | 22
(Malaysia) Goh S H (Malaysia) S J Lai | 14 | 15
(Denmark) N Nøhr (Denmark) A Magelund | 21 | 21

Quarter-finals
(Indonesia) R Rivaldy (Indonesia) P H Mentari | 20 | 21 | 21
(Denmark) N Nøhr (Denmark) A Magelund | 22 | 18 | 13

=== Bottom half ===
==== Section 3 ====
First Round
(Chinese Taipei) Yang P-hs (Chinese Taipei) Hu L-f | 21 | 13 | 21
(Denmark) M Christiansen (Denmark) A Bøje | 17 | 21 | 19
(Thailand) S Jomkoh (Thailand) S Paewsampran | 21 | 21
8 | (Malaysia) Tan K M (Malaysia) Lai P J | 16 | 17
(Chinese Taipei) Lee J-h (Chinese Taipei) Hsu Y-c | 21 | 14 | 14
(Malaysia) Chen T J (Malaysia) Peck Y W | 18 | 21 | 21
(Germany) J R Jansen (Germany) L Efler | 9 | 14
3 | (England) M Ellis (England) L Smith | 21 | 21

Second Round
(Chinese Taipei) Yang P-hs (Chinese Taipei) Hu L-f | 17 | 21 | 19
(Thailand) S Jomkoh (Thailand) S Paewsampran | 21 | 15 | 21
(Malaysia) Chen T J (Malaysia) Peck Y W | 18 | 21 | 21
3 | (England) M Ellis (England) L Smith | 21 | 11 | 14

Quarter-finals
(Thailand) S Jomkoh (Thailand) S Paewsampran | 21 | 21
(Malaysia) Chen T J (Malaysia) Peck Y W | 18 | 13

==== Section 4 ====
First Round
(Indonesia) A Maulana (Indonesia) M C Bandaso | 21 | 21
(Hong Kong) Chang T C (Hong Kong) Ng W Y | 15 | 17
(Germany) M Lamsfuß (Germany) I Lohau | 23 | 21
7 | (Hong Kong) Tang C M (Hong Kong) Tse Y S | 21 | 17
(France) R Labar (Australia) G Somerville | 10 | 15
(Denmark) M Thyrri (Denmark) M Surrow | 21 | 21
(France) W Villeger (France) A Tran | 21 | 8 | 21
2 | (Indonesia) P Jordan (Indonesia) M D Oktavianti | 13 | 21 | 23

Second Round
(Indonesia) A Maulana (Indonesia) M C Bandaso | 11 | 18
(Germany) M Lamsfuß (Germany) I Lohau | 21 | 21
(Denmark) M Thyrri (Denmark) M Surrow | 17 | 21 | 12
2 | (Indonesia) P Jordan (Indonesia) M D Oktavianti | 21 | 18 | 21

Quarter-finals
(Germany) M Lamsfuß (Germany) I Lohau | 14 | 21 | 12
2 | (Indonesia) P Jordan (Indonesia) M D Oktavianti | 21 | 18 | 21

| Preceded by 2021 French Open | BWF World Tour; 2021 BWF season | Succeeded by 2021 Indonesia Masters |
