= 2022 Swiss Open (badminton) =

Badminton tournament in Basel

Tournament details
- Dates: 22–27 March
- Edition: 59th
- Level: Super 300
- Total prize money: US$180,000
- Venue: St. Jakobshalle
- Location: Basel, Switzerland

Champions
- Men's singles: (Indonesia) Jonatan Christie
- Women's singles: (India) P. V. Sindhu
- Men's doubles: (Indonesia) Fajar Alfian (Indonesia) Muhammad Rian Ardianto
- Women's doubles: (Bulgaria) Gabriela Stoeva (Bulgaria) Stefani Stoeva
- Mixed doubles: (Germany) Mark Lamsfuß (Germany) Isabel Lohau

The 2022 Swiss Open (officially known as the Yonex Swiss Open 2022 for sponsorship reasons) was a badminton tournament that took place in St. Jakobshalle at Basel, Switzerland from 22 to 27 March, with a total prize pool of $180,000.

== Tournament ==
The 2022 Swiss Open was the sixth tournament of the 2022 BWF World Tour and was part of the Swiss Open championships which has been held since 1955. It was organized by the Swiss Badminton with sanction from the Badminton World Federation.

=== Venue ===
This tournament took place at St. Jakobshalle in Basel, Switzerland.

=== Point distribution ===
Below is the point distribution table for each phase of the tournament based on the BWF point system for the BWF World Tour Super 300 event.

Winner	Runner-up	3/4	5/8	9/16	17/32	33/64	65/128
7,000	5,950	4,900	3,850	2,750	1,670	660	320

=== Prize pool ===
The total prize money was US$180,000 with the distribution of the prize money in accordance with BWF regulations.

Event	Winner	Finalist	Semi-finals	Quarter-finals	Last 16
Singles	$13,500	$6,480	$2,610	$1,080	$630
Doubles	$14,220	$6,480	$2,520	$1,305	$675

== Men's singles ==
=== Seeds ===
1. (Denmark) Viktor Axelsen (second round)
2. (Denmark) Anders Antonsen (quarter-finals)
3. (Indonesia) Anthony Sinisuka Ginting (semi-finals)
4. (Indonesia) Jonatan Christie (champion)
5. (Singapore) Loh Kean Yew (withdrew)
6. (Hong Kong) Ng Ka Long (withdrew)
7. (India) Srikanth Kidambi (semi-finals)
8. (India) Lakshya Sen (withdrew)

=== Finals ===
Semi-finals
(India) Prannoy H. S.	21	19	21
3	(Indonesia) Anthony Sinisuka Ginting	19	21	18
4	(Indonesia) Jonatan Christie	18	21	21
7	(India) Srikanth Kidambi	21	7	13

Final
(India) Prannoy H. S.	12	18
4	(Indonesia) Jonatan Christie	21	21

=== Top half ===
==== Section 1 ====
First round
1	(Denmark) V Axelsen	21	21
PFQ	(Indonesia) C A Dwi Wardoyo	15	12
(India) Parupalli K	21	21
Q3	(France) E Roy	17	9
PFQ	(Finland) K Koljonen	22	21
PFQ	(England) T Penty	20	12
(India) B. Sai Praneeth	23	16
(India) Prannoy H. S.	25	21

Second round
1	(Denmark) V Axelsen
(India) Parupalli K	w	/	o
PFQ	(Finland) K Koljonen	21	13	9
(India) Prannoy H. S.	19	21	21

Quarter-finals
(India) Parupalli K	16	16
(India) Prannoy H. S.	21	21

==== Section 2 ====
First round
3	(Indonesia) A S Ginting	21	21
(Indonesia) S H Rhustavito	16	19
PFQ	(Germany) M Weißkirchen	14	11
PFQ	(France) A Merklé	21	21
PFQ	(France) L Claerbout	21	15	11
(India) Sa Verma	18	21	21
Q2	(Azerbaijan) A R Dwicahyo	12	21
(Canada) B Yang	21	18^{r}

Second round
3	(Indonesia) A S Ginting	21	14	21
PFQ	(France) A Merklé	14	21	19
(India) Sa Verma	23	21
Q2	(Azerbaijan) A R Dwicahyo	21	7

Quarter-finals
3	(Indonesia) A S Ginting	21	21
(India) Sa Verma	17	14

=== Bottom half ===
==== Section 3 ====
First round
(France) T J Popov	21	21
(Hong Kong) Lee C Y	13	14
(Netherlands) M Caljouw	21	15	21
PFQ	(Sweden) F Burestedt	18	21	12
PFQ	(Malaysia) Ng T Y	21	21
Q4	(Germany) F Roth	16	15
(France) T Rouxel	10	15
4	(Indonesia) J Christie	21	21

Second round
(France) T J Popov	21	21
(Netherlands) M Caljouw	18	10
PFQ	(Malaysia) Ng T Y	21	13	12
4	(Indonesia) J Christie	18	21	21

Quarter-finals
(France) T J Popov	18	21	22
4	(Indonesia) J Christie	21	16	24

==== Section 4 ====
First round
(Japan) K Watanabe	21	19	18
PFQ	(France) C Popov	18	21	21
Q1	(Denmark) M Christophersen	16	17
7	(India) S Kidambi	21	21
(Thailand) S Thammasin	21	21
(Republic of Ireland) N Nguyen	18	13
PFQ	(Denmark) V Svendsen	14	14
2	(Denmark) A Antonsen	21	21

Second round
PFQ	(France) C Popov	21	23	11
7	(India) S Kidambi	13	25	21
(Thailand) S Thammasin	21	14	14
2	(Denmark) A Antonsen	17	21	21

Quarter-finals
7	(India) S Kidambi	21	19	22
2	(Denmark) A Antonsen	19	21	20

== Women's singles ==
=== Seeds ===
1. (China) Chen Yufei (withdrew)
2. (India) P. V. Sindhu (champion)
3. (China) He Bingjiao (withdrew)
4. (Thailand) Busanan Ongbamrungphan (final)
5. (Canada) Michelle Li (quarter-finals)
6. (Denmark) Mia Blichfeldt (withdrew)
7. (China) Wang Zhiyi (withdrew)
8. (Scotland) Kirsty Gilmour (semi-finals)

=== Wildcard ===
Swiss Badminton awarded a wild card entry to Jenjira Stadelmann of Switzerland.

=== Finals ===
Semi-finals
8	(Scotland) Kirsty Gilmour	16	18
4	(Thailand) Busanan Ongbamrungphan	21	21
(Thailand) Supanida Katethong	18	21	19
2	(India) P. V. Sindhu	21	15	21

Final
4	(Thailand) Busanan Ongbamrungphan	16	8
2	(India) P. V. Sindhu	21	21

=== Top half ===
==== Section 1 ====
First round
PFQ	(Republic of Ireland) K Frost	4	4
(United States) I Wang	21	21
(Estonia) K Kuuba	21	21
Q4	(Luxembourg) K Schmidt	11	12
8	(Scotland) K Gilmour	21	21
(Japan) A Takahashi	19	9
(France) L Huet	21	10	11
PFQ	(India) A Chaliha	19	21	21

Second round
(United States) I Wang	21	21
(Estonia) K Kuuba	14	12
8	(Scotland) K Gilmour	21	22
PFQ	(India) A Chaliha	18	20

Quarter-finals
(United States) I Wang	19	16
8	(Scotland) K Gilmour	21	21

==== Section 2 ====
First round
4	(Thailand) B Ongbamrungphan	21	21
PFQ	(Poland) J Hart	9	12
(Belgium) L Tan	21	21
PFQ	(Netherlands) G Mahulette	14	16
PFQ	(India) M Bansod	16	17
(France) Qi XF	21	21
(India) A Kashyap	5	17
(Germany) Y Li	21	21

Second round
4	(Thailand) B Ongbamrungphan	21	21
(Belgium) L Tan	15	9
(France) Qi XF	24	21	16
(Germany) Y Li	26	8	21

Quarter-finals
4	(Thailand) B Ongbamrungphan	21	21
(Germany) Y Li	12	19

=== Bottom half ===
==== Section 3 ====
First round
PFQ	(Malaysia) Kisona S	21	21
Q2	(Switzerland) N Fankhauser	13	11
(India) S Nehwal	21	21
PFQ	(France) Y Hoyaux	8	13
(Denmark) J D Jakobsen	24	21
WC	(Switzerland) J Stadelmann	22	15
(Thailand) S Katethong	21	21
PFQ	(United States) L Lam	17	14

Second round
PFQ	(Malaysia) Kisona S	17	21	21
(India) S Nehwal	21	13	13
(Denmark) J D Jakobsen	10	17
(Thailand) S Katethong	21	21

Quarter-finals
PFQ	(Malaysia) Kisona S	11	12
(Thailand) S Katethong	21	21

==== Section 4 ====
First round
(Denmark) L Christophersen	21	21
Q1	(Germany) S Hübsch	12	12
(France) M Batomene	15	8
5	(Canada) M Li	21	21
(Turkey) N Yiğit	21	21
Q3	(Switzerland) M Schnider	10	13
(Denmark) L Kjærsfeldt	14	12
2	(India) P. V. Sindhu	21	21

Second round
(Denmark) L Christophersen	18	21
5	(Canada) M Li	21	23
(Turkey) N Yiğit	19	14
2	(India) P. V. Sindhu	21	21

Quarter-finals
5	(Canada) M Li	10	19
2	(India) P. V. Sindhu	21	21

== Men's doubles ==
=== Seeds ===
1. (Indonesia) Mohammad Ahsan / Hendra Setiawan (first round)
2. (Malaysia) Aaron Chia / Soh Wooi Yik (semi-finals)
3. (India) Satwiksairaj Rankireddy / Chirag Shetty (second round)
4. (Indonesia) Fajar Alfian / Muhammad Rian Ardianto (champions)
5. (Denmark) Kim Astrup / Anders Skaarup Rasmussen (quarter-finals)
6. (Malaysia) Ong Yew Sin / Teo Ee Yi (quarter-finals)
7. (Germany) Mark Lamsfuß / Marvin Seidel (quarter-finals)
8. (Malaysia) Goh Sze Fei / Nur Izzuddin (final)

=== Finals ===
Semi-finals
8	(Malaysia) Goh Sze Fei (Malaysia) Nur Izzuddin	21	21
(Indonesia) Pramudya Kusumawardana (Indonesia) Yeremia Rambitan	18	18
4	(Indonesia) Fajar Alfian (Indonesia) Muhammad Rian Ardianto	22	13	21
2	(Malaysia) Aaron Chia (Malaysia) Soh Wooi Yik	20	21	8

Final
8	(Malaysia) Goh Sze Fei (Malaysia) Nur Izzuddin	18	19
4	(Indonesia) Fajar Alfian (Indonesia) Muhammad Rian Ardianto	21	21

=== Top half ===
==== Section 1 ====
First round
1	(Indonesia) M Ahsan (Indonesia) H Setiawan	12	0^{r}
(Indonesia) L R Carnando (Indonesia) D Marthin	21	0
PFQ	(India) V K H Ranganatha (India) A Surya	14	17
(England) B Lane (England) S Vendy	21	21
8	(Malaysia) Goh S F (Malaysia) N Izzuddin	21	21
Q1	(Denmark) E Lauritzen (Denmark) M Vestergaard	9	13
(Denmark) J Bay (Denmark) L Mølhede	w	/	o
Q2

Second round
(Indonesia) L R Carnando (Indonesia) D Marthin	w	/	o
(England) B Lane (England) S Vendy
8	(Malaysia) Goh S F (Malaysia) N Izzuddin	23	21
(Denmark) J Bay (Denmark) L Mølhede	21	18

Quarter-finals
(Indonesia) L R Carnando (Indonesia) D Marthin	18	21	12
8	(Malaysia) Goh S F (Malaysia) N Izzuddin	21	19	21

==== Section 2 ====
First round
3	(India) S Rankireddy (India) C Shetty	17	21	21
(Indonesia) M S Fikri (Indonesia) B Maulana	21	11	18
(Japan) K Matsui (Japan) Y Takeuchi	30	11	17
(Indonesia) P Kusumawardana (Indonesia) Y Rambitan	29	21	21
5	(Denmark) K Astrup (Denmark) A S Rasmussen	21	19	21
PFQ	(Algeria) K Mammeri (Algeria) Y S Medel	6	21	9
PFQ	(Denmark) J Eipe (Denmark) D Lundgaard	21	21
(England) C Hemming (England) S Stallwood	14	15

Second round
3	(India) S Rankireddy (India) C Shetty	19	20
(Indonesia) P Kusumawardana (Indonesia) Y Rambitan	21	22
5	(Denmark) K Astrup (Denmark) A S Rasmussen	13	21	21
PFQ	(Denmark) J Eipe (Denmark) D Lundgaard	21	16	16

Quarter-finals
(Indonesia) P Kusumawardana (Indonesia) Y Rambitan	21	10	21
5	(Denmark) K Astrup (Denmark) A S Rasmussen	17	21	14

=== Bottom half ===
==== Section 3 ====
First round
PFQ	(Singapore) T Hee (Singapore) Loh K H	21	17
(Scotland) A Dunn (Scotland) A Hall	23	21
(France) C Popov (France) T J Popov	19	21	17
6	(Malaysia) Ong Y S (Malaysia) Teo E Y	21	17	21
PFQ	(England) R Easton (England) Z Russ	30	14	18
Q4	(India) I Bhatnagar (India) S Pratheek K.	28	21	21
(India) Arjun M.R. (India) D Kapila	19	13
4	(Indonesia) F Alfian (Indonesia) M R Ardianto	21	21

Second round
(Scotland) A Dunn (Scotland) A Hall	16	12
6	(Malaysia) Ong Y S (Malaysia) Teo E Y	21	21
Q4	(India) I Bhatnagar (India) S Pratheek K.	15	12
4	(Indonesia) F Alfian (Indonesia) M R Ardianto	21	21

Quarter-finals
6	(Malaysia) Ong Y S (Malaysia) Teo E Y	12	21	20
4	(Indonesia) F Alfian (Indonesia) M R Ardianto	21	9	22

==== Section 4 ====
First round
(France) L Corvée (France) R Labar	21	17	18
(France) F Delrue (France) W Villeger	13	21	21
PFQ	(France) E Adam (France) J Maio	15	17
7	(Germany) M Lamsfuß (Germany) M Seidel	21	21
(China) He JT (China) Zhou HD
PFQ	(India) B Navaneeth (India) B. S Reddy	w	/	o
Q3	(Algeria) M A Belarbi (Algeria) A Hamek	11	13
2	(Malaysia) A Chia (Malaysia) Soh W Y	21	21

Second round
(France) F Delrue (France) W Villeger	21	21	14
7	(Germany) M Lamsfuß (Germany) M Seidel	23	19	21
PFQ	(India) B Navaneeth (India) B. S Reddy	15	14
2	(Malaysia) A Chia (Malaysia) Soh W Y	21	21

Quarter-finals
7	(Germany) M Lamsfuß (Germany) M Seidel	11	13
2	(Malaysia) A Chia (Malaysia) Soh W Y	21	21

== Women's doubles ==
=== Seeds ===
1. (China) Chen Qingchen / Jia Yifan (withdrew)
2. (Thailand) Jongkolphan Kititharakul / Rawinda Prajongjai (semi-finals)
3. (Bulgaria) Gabriela Stoeva / Stefani Stoeva (champions)
4. (Denmark) Maiken Fruergaard / Sara Thygesen (first round)
5. (Indonesia) Apriyani Rahayu / Siti Fadia Silva Ramadhanti (withdrew)
6. (India) Ashwini Ponnappa / N. Sikki Reddy (quarter-finals)
7. (China) Liu Xuanxuan / Xia Yuting (withdrew)
8. (Denmark) Amalie Magelund / Freja Ravn (withdrew)

=== Finals ===
Semi-finals
(Malaysia) Vivian Hoo (Malaysia) Lim Chiew Sien	10	16
3	(Bulgaria) Gabriela Stoeva (Bulgaria) Stefani Stoeva	21	21
(Germany) Linda Efler (Germany) Isabel Lohau	w	/	o
2	(Thailand) Jongkolphan Kititharakul (Thailand) Rawinda Prajongjai

Final
3	(Bulgaria) Gabriela Stoeva (Bulgaria) Stefani Stoeva	21	21
(Germany) Linda Efler (Germany) Isabel Lohau	14	12

=== Top half ===
==== Section 1 ====
First round
1	(China) Chen QC (China) Jia YF
(Malaysia) Low Y Y (Malaysia) V Siow	w	/	o
PFQ	(Malaysia) Go P K (Malaysia) Yap L	17	9
(Malaysia) V Hoo (Malaysia) Lim C S	21	21
6	(India) A Ponnappa (India) N. S Reddy	21	21
(Switzerland) A Müller (Switzerland) J Stadelmann	15	16
(Scotland) J MacPherson (Scotland) C Torrance	19	21	16
Q4	(Germany) Y Li (United States) I Wang	21	15	21

Second round
(Malaysia) Low Y Y (Malaysia) V Siow	14	12
(Malaysia) V Hoo (Malaysia) Lim C S	21	21
6	(India) A Ponnappa (India) N. S Reddy	21	21
Q4	(Germany) Y Li (United States) I Wang	11	18

Quarter-finals
(Malaysia) V Hoo (Malaysia) Lim C S	22	23
6	(India) A Ponnappa (India) N. S Reddy	20	21

==== Section 2 ====
First round
3	(Bulgaria) G Stoeva (Bulgaria) S Stoeva	21	21
(Estonia) K-K Marran (Estonia) H Rüütel	9	16
Q2
(Republic of Ireland) K Frost (Republic of Ireland) M Ryan	w	/	o
PFQ	(Switzerland) N Fankhauser (Switzerland) C Racloz	18	21	15
(Denmark) N P. Anthonisen (Denmark) C Graversen	21	16	21
(Germany) L Michalski (Germany) F Volkmann	21	21
Q1	(Germany) C Siebrecht (Germany) E Sonnenschein	10	10

Second round
3	(Bulgaria) G Stoeva (Bulgaria) S Stoeva	21	21
(Republic of Ireland) K Frost (Republic of Ireland) M Ryan	6	8
(Denmark) N P. Anthonisen (Denmark) C Graversen	19	21	21
(Germany) L Michalski (Germany) F Volkmann	21	19	18

Quarter-finals
3	(Bulgaria) G Stoeva (Bulgaria) S Stoeva	21	21
(Denmark) N P. Anthonisen (Denmark) C Graversen	12	8

=== Bottom half ===
==== Section 3 ====
First round
PFQ	(Germany) S Hübsch (Germany) J Mayer	11	10
(Sweden) J Magnusson (Sweden) C Nistad	21	21
(Germany) L Efler (Germany) I Lohau	21	21
PFQ	(France) M Hoareau (France) C Pognante	11	7
(England) C Birch (England) J Pugh	19	14
(Netherlands) D Jille (Netherlands) C Seinen	21	21
(Malaysia) A Cheong (Malaysia) Teoh M X	19	21	21
4	(Denmark) M Fruergaard (Denmark) S Thygesen	21	11	11

Second round
(Sweden) J Magnusson (Sweden) C Nistad	16	21	17
(Germany) L Efler (Germany) I Lohau	21	10	21
(Netherlands) D Jille (Netherlands) C Seinen	15	14
(Malaysia) A Cheong (Malaysia) Teoh M X	21	21

Quarter-finals
(Germany) L Efler (Germany) I Lohau	21	21
(Malaysia) A Cheong (Malaysia) Teoh M X	18	18

==== Section 4 ====
First round
Q3
(Austria) S Au Yeong (Austria) K Hochmeir	w	/	o
(Thailand) B Aimsaard (Thailand) N Aimsaard	21	21
PFQ	(Luxembourg) K Schmidt (Luxembourg) Z Sinico	4	7
(France) M Lambert (France) A Tran	21	21
PFQ	(France) T Margueritte (France) A Tatranova	18	7
(India) T Jolly (India) G Gopichand	10	17
2	(Thailand) J Kititharakul (Thailand) R Prajongjai	21	21

Second round
(Austria) S Au Yeong (Austria) K Hochmeir	8	12
(Thailand) B Aimsaard (Thailand) N Aimsaard	21	21
(France) M Lambert (France) A Tran	13	12
2	(Thailand) J Kititharakul (Thailand) R Prajongjai	21	21

Quarter-finals
(Thailand) B Aimsaard (Thailand) N Aimsaard	14	14
2	(Thailand) J Kititharakul (Thailand) R Prajongjai	21	21

== Mixed doubles ==
=== Seeds ===
1. (China) Wang Yilyu / Huang Dongping (withdrew)
2. (Indonesia) Praveen Jordan / Melati Daeva Oktavianti (first round)
3. (England) Marcus Ellis / Lauren Smith (second round)
4. (Malaysia) Tan Kian Meng / Lai Pei Jing (semi-finals)
5. (France) Thom Gicquel / Delphine Delrue (quarter-finals)
6. (Malaysia) Goh Soon Huat / Shevon Jemie Lai (final)
7. (Denmark) Mathias Christiansen / Alexandra Bøje (quarter-finals)
8. (Germany) Mark Lamsfuß / Isabel Lohau (champions)

=== Finals ===
Semi-finals
(Indonesia) Rehan Naufal Kusharjanto (Indonesia) Lisa Ayu Kusumawati	17	15
8	(Germany) Mark Lamsfuß (Germany) Isabel Lohau	21	21
4	(Malaysia) Tan Kian Meng (Malaysia) Lai Pei Jing	17	22
6	(Malaysia) Goh Soon Huat (Malaysia) Shevon Jemie Lai	21	24

Final
8	(Germany) Mark Lamsfuß (Germany) Isabel Lohau	12	21	21
6	(Malaysia) Goh Soon Huat (Malaysia) Shevon Jemie Lai	21	18	17

=== Top half ===
==== Section 1 ====
First round
PFQ	(India) K. S Pratheek (India) N. S Reddy	15	19
(Denmark) M Mikkelsen (Denmark) R Søby Hansen	21	21
(Malaysia) Hoo P R (Malaysia) Cheah Y S
(Indonesia) R N Kusharjanto (Indonesia) L A Kusumawati	w	/	o
5	(France) T Gicquel (France) D Delrue	21	21
Q1	(India) B S Reddy (India) A Ponnappa	13	9
(India) I Bhatnagar (India) T Crasto	21	20	14
(Malaysia) Chen T J (Malaysia) Peck Y W	18	22	21

Second round
(Denmark) M Mikkelsen (Denmark) R Søby Hansen	15	21	16
(Indonesia) R N Kusharjanto (Indonesia) L A Kusumawati	21	15	21
5	(France) T Gicquel (France) D Delrue	21	21
(Malaysia) Chen T J (Malaysia) Peck Y W	19	19

Quarter-finals
(Indonesia) R N Kusharjanto (Indonesia) L A Kusumawati	21	21
5	(France) T Gicquel (France) D Delrue	19	16

==== Section 2 ====
First round
3	(England) M Ellis (England) L Smith	21	21
(Indonesia) R Rivaldy (Indonesia) P H Mentari	14	19
(Germany) J R Jansen (Germany) L Efler	21	14	21
(Indonesia) D Ferdinansyah (Indonesia) G E Widjaja	17	21	16
8	(Germany) M Lamsfuß (Germany) I Lohau	21	21
(India) V G Prasad (India) J Dewangan	9	15
Q4	(Germany) J Pistorius (Germany) E Moszczynski	15	19
Q3	(France) F Delrue (France) V Heriau	21	21

Second round
3	(England) M Ellis (England) L Smith	21	19	19
(Germany) J R Jansen (Germany) L Efler	16	21	21
8	(Germany) M Lamsfuß (Germany) I Lohau	21	21
Q3	(France) F Delrue (France) V Heriau	15	5

Quarter-finals
(Germany) J R Jansen (Germany) L Efler	13	17
8	(Germany) M Lamsfuß (Germany) I Lohau	21	21

=== Bottom half ===
==== Section 3 ====
First round
Q2	(Indonesia) A B Cahyono (Indonesia) M G Islami	17	12
(Singapore) T Hee (Singapore) Tan W H	21	21
(Japan) K Yamashita (Japan) N Shinoya	14	21	18
7	(Denmark) M Christiansen (Denmark) A Bøje	21	19	21
(Denmark) M Thyrri (Denmark) A Magelund	21	21
(New Zealand) O Leydon-Davis (New Zealand) A Pak	14	5
PFQ	(India) Arjun M.R. (India) T Jolly	15	17
4	(Malaysia) Tan K M (Malaysia) Lai P J	21	21

Second round
(Singapore) T Hee (Singapore) Tan W H	17	20
7	(Denmark) M Christiansen (Denmark) A Bøje	21	22
(Denmark) M Thyrri (Denmark) A Magelund	17	17
4	(Malaysia) Tan K M (Malaysia) Lai P J	21	21

Quarter-finals
7	(Denmark) M Christiansen (Denmark) A Bøje	21	20	15
4	(Malaysia) Tan K M (Malaysia) Lai P J	11	22	21

==== Section 4 ====
First round
(England) C Hemming (England) J Pugh	14	14
(Scotland) A Hall (Scotland) J MacPherson	21	21
PFQ	(India) D Kapila (India) G Gopichand	18	15
6	(Malaysia) Goh S H (Malaysia) S J Lai	21	21
(France) W Villeger (France) A Tran	21	21
PFQ	(Germany) P Scheiel (Germany) F Volkmann	8	16
(Indonesia) A Maulana (Indonesia) M C Bandaso	21	28
2	(Indonesia) P Jordan (Indonesia) M D Oktavianti	13	26

Second round
(Scotland) A Hall (Scotland) J MacPherson	20	8
6	(Malaysia) Goh S H (Malaysia) S J Lai	22	21
(France) W Villeger (France) A Tran	21	10	21
(Indonesia) A Maulana (Indonesia) M C Bandaso	13	21	16

Quarter-finals
6	(Malaysia) Goh S H (Malaysia) S J Lai	21	21
(France) W Villeger (France) A Tran	17	12

Preceded by 2022 All England Open	BWF World Tour; 2022 BWF season	Succeeded by 2022 Orléans Masters
