= 2022 Orléans Masters =

Badminton tournament in Orléans

Tournament details
- Dates: 29 March – 3 April
- Edition: 10th
- Level: Super 100
- Total prize money: US$90,000
- Venue: Palais des Sports
- Location: Orléans, Centre-Val de Loire, France

Champions
- Men's singles: (France) Toma Junior Popov
- Women's singles: (Indonesia) Putri Kusuma Wardani
- Men's doubles: (Netherlands) Ruben Jille (Netherlands) Ties van der Lecq
- Women's doubles: (Bulgaria) Gabriela Stoeva (Bulgaria) Stefani Stoeva
- Mixed doubles: (Singapore) Terry Hee (Singapore) Tan Wei Han

The 2022 Orléans Masters was a badminton tournament that took place in the Palais des Sports at Orléans, France, from 29 March to 3 April 2022. The tournament had a total prize pool of $90,000.

== Tournament ==
The 2022 Orléans Masters was the seventh tournament and the second Super 100 tournament of the 2022 BWF World Tour. It was part of the Orléans Masters championships which had been held since 2012. It was organized by the Cercle Laïque des Tourelles Orléans (CLTO) Badminton with sanction from the Badminton World Federation.

=== Venue ===
This tournament took place at the Palais des Sports in Orléans, Centre-Val de Loire, France.

=== Point distribution ===
Below is the point distribution table for each phase of the tournament based on the BWF points system for the BWF Tour Super 100 event.

Winner	Runner-up	3/4	5/8	9/16	17/32	33/64	65/128	129/256
5,500	4,680	3,850	3,030	2,110	1,290	510	240	100

=== Prize pool ===
The total prize money was US$90,000 with the distribution of the prize money in accordance with BWF regulations.

Event	Winner	Finalist	Semi-finals	Quarter-finals	Last 16
Singles	$6,750	$3,420	$1,305	$540	$315
Doubles	$7,110	$3,420	$1,260	$652.50	$337.50

== Men's singles ==
=== Seeds ===
1. (India) B. Sai Praneeth (third round)
2. (Denmark) Hans-Kristian Vittinghus (third round)
3. (Netherlands) Mark Caljouw (second round)
4. (France) Toma Junior Popov (champion)
5. (France) Brice Leverdez (withdrew)
6. (France) Thomas Rouxel (second round)
7. (Brazil) Ygor Coelho (third round)
8. (England) Toby Penty (second round)

=== Finals ===
Semi-finals
(France) Christo Popov	21	11	13
4	(France) Toma Junior Popov	15	21	21
Q4	(Indonesia) Christian Adinata	18	14
(India) Mithun Manjunath	21	21

Final
4	(France) Toma Junior Popov	21	21
(India) Mithun Manjunath	11	19

=== Top half ===
==== Section 1 ====
First round
Q5	(India) A Yadav	10	15
PFQ	(Czech Republic) J Louda	21	21
(France) C Popov	21	19	21
PFQ	(Malaysia) Yeoh S Z	16	21	11
(Azerbaijan) A R Dwicahyo	15	6
Q6	(Chinese Taipei) Lee C-h	21	21
Q8	(England) J Torjussen	21	21
(India) R Y Chittaboina	15	9

Second round
1	(India) B. Sai Praneeth	21	21
PFQ	(Czech Republic) J Louda	19	12
(Denmark) D J Holm	19	16
(France) C Popov	21	21
6	(France) T Rouxel	13	17
Q6	(Chinese Taipei) Lee C-h	21	21
(Malaysia) A Sholeh	19	21	21
Q8	(England) J Torjussen	21	12	17

Third round
1	(India) B. Sai Praneeth	12	11
(France) C Popov	21	21
Q6	(Chinese Taipei) Lee C-h	21	18	21
(Malaysia) A Sholeh	16	21	10

Quarter-finals
(France) C Popov	16	21	21
Q6	(Chinese Taipei) Lee C-h	21	18	19

==== Section 2 ====
First round
Q1	(India) A Mishra	16	18
Q3	(Germany) F Roth	21	21
(Canada) XD Sheng	16	18
(Indonesia) C A Dwi Wardoyo	21	21
(India) P Rajawat	19	21	21
(India) S Dey	21	13	11
(Spain) L E Peñalver	12
(France) L Claerbout	5^{r}

Second round
4	(France) T J Popov	21	21
Q3	(Germany) F Roth	8	11
(Germany) K Schäfer	9	16
(Indonesia) C A Dwi Wardoyo	21	21
PFQ	(Belgium) J Carraggi	21	21
(India) P Rajawat	15	14
(Singapore) J Teh	24	11	21
(Spain) L E Peñalver	22	21	11

Third round
4	(France) T J Popov	20	21	21
(Indonesia) C A Dwi Wardoyo	22	14	19
PFQ	(Belgium) J Carraggi	19	21	12
(Singapore) J Teh	21	16	21

Quarter-finals
4	(France) T J Popov	21	21
(Singapore) J Teh	16	15

=== Bottom half ===
==== Section 3 ====
First round
(France) A Merklé	15	21	21
(India) Si Verma	21	12	16
(Ukraine) D Bosniuk	16	15
(Spain) P Abián	21	21
(India) C Sen	21	21
(India) K Dharmamer	15	6
(India) K George	21	21
(Netherlands) J Kweekel	17	11

Second round
(France) A Merklé	21	21
(Sweden) F Burestedt	12	9
(Spain) P Abián	18	15
7	(Brazil) Y Coelho	21	21
(India) C Sen	21	12	11
Q4	(Indonesia) C Adinata	19	21	21
(India) K George	19	21	23
3	(Netherlands) M Caljouw	21	16	21

Third round
(France) A Merklé	21	21
7	(Brazil) Y Coelho	16	11
Q4	(Indonesia) C Adinata	21	21
(India) K George	16	9

Quarter-finals
(France) A Merklé	21	18	16
Q4	(Indonesia) C Adinata	10	21	21

==== Section 4 ====
First round
PFQ	(Malaysia) Leong J H	16	14
(Indonesia) I Rumbay	21	21
Q7	(India) M L Maisnam	21	17	21
(Denmark) M Christophersen	19	21	19
(India) M Manjunath	21	21
(India) K G Kumar	10	13
(Bulgaria) D Nikolov	15	13
(Germany) M Weißkirchen	21	21

Second round
(Indonesia) I Rumbay	11	16
Q2	(Hong Kong) Chan Y C	21	21
Q7	(India) M L Maisnam	21	21
8	(England) T Penty	16	16
(India) M Manjunath	21	21
PFQ	(India) S Pratap Singh	14	10
(Germany) M Weißkirchen	15	17
2	(Denmark) H-K Vittinghus	21	21

Third round
Q2	(Hong Kong) Chan Y C	21	15	21
Q7	(India) M L Maisnam	12	21	19
(India) M Manjunath	16	21	21
2	(Denmark) H-K Vittinghus	21	10	11

Quarter-finals
Q2	(Hong Kong) Chan Y C	13	18
(India) M Manjunath	21	21

== Women's singles ==
=== Seeds ===
1. (Canada) Michelle Li (withdrew)
2. (Indonesia) Gregoria Mariska Tunjung (withdrew)
3. (Denmark) Line Kjærsfeldt (semi-finals)
4. (United States) Iris Wang (final)
5. (Belgium) Lianne Tan (withdrew)
6. (Denmark) Julie Dawall Jakobsen (first round)
7. (France) Qi Xuefei (first round)
8. (Indonesia) Ruselli Hartawan (second round)

=== Finals ===
Semi-finals
(Indonesia) Putri Kusuma Wardani	21	22
3	(Denmark) Line Kjærsfeldt	10	20
4	(United States) Iris Wang	21	21
PFQ	(Canada) Zhang Wenyu	18	10

Final
(Indonesia) Putri Kusuma Wardani	7	21	21
4	(United States) Iris Wang	21	19	18

=== Top half ===
==== Section 1 ====
First round
PFQ	(India) R Das	18	17
(United States) L Lam	21	21
(Estonia) K Kuuba	21	21
(Israel) K Polikarpova	9	19
8	(Indonesia) R Hartawan	22	22
(Malaysia) Kisona S	20	20
(India) A Chaliha	17	21	14
(Indonesia) P K Wardani	21	19	21

Second round
(United States) L Lam	8	10
(Estonia) K Kuuba	21	21
8	(Indonesia) R Hartawan	11	10
(Indonesia) P K Wardani	21	21

Quarter-finals
(Estonia) K Kuuba	5	17
(Indonesia) P K Wardani	21	21

==== Section 2 ====
First round
3	(Denmark) L Kjærsfeldt	21	21
(Spain) C Azurmendi	19	16
(Poland) J Hart	21	21
PFQ	(United States) J Gai	7	12
7	(France) Qi XF	14	17
PFQ	(India) I Sharma	21	21
(Australia) Chen H-y	21	21
(Spain) B Corrales	14	15

Second round
3	(Denmark) L Kjærsfeldt	21	21
(Poland) J Hart	15	9
PFQ	(India) I Sharma	11	17
(Australia) Chen H-y	21	21

Quarter-finals
3	(Denmark) L Kjærsfeldt	21	21
(Australia) Chen H-y	14	14

=== Bottom half ===
==== Section 3 ====
First round
Q3	(Denmark) A Schulz	27	21
(Slovakia) M Repiská	25	13
Q2	(Netherlands) G Mahulette	21	19	21
6	(Denmark) J D Jakobsen	17	21	17
PFQ	(Bulgaria) M Mitsova	21	14	21
(Indonesia) Y Y Susanto	15	21	18
(France) M Batomene	8	2^{r}
4	(United States) I Wang	21	14

Second round
Q3	(Denmark) A Schulz	21	13	21
Q2	(Netherlands) G Mahulette	19	21	19
PFQ	(Bulgaria) M Mitsova	14	21	19
4	(United States) I Wang	21	15	21

Quarter-finals
Q3	(Denmark) A Schulz	15	9
4	(United States) I Wang	21	21

==== Section 4 ====
First round
(Turkey) A Demirbağ	9	17
(France) L Huet	21	21
(India) A Upadhyaya	21	21
PFQ	(Switzerland) J Stadelmann	12	18
Q1	(India) K Mopati	21	7	15
PFQ	(Canada) Zhang WY	16	21	21
Q4	(Ukraine) P Buhrova	21	18	21
PFQ	(Turkey) Ö Bayrak	18	21	13

Second round
(France) L Huet	17	16
(India) A Upadhyaya	21	21
PFQ	(Canada) Zhang WY	21	21
Q4	(Ukraine) P Buhrova	13	8

Quarter-finals
(India) A Upadhyaya	21	22	18
PFQ	(Canada) Zhang WY	17	24	21

== Men's doubles ==
=== Seeds ===
1. (Germany) Mark Lamsfuß / Marvin Seidel (withdrew)
2. (France) Christo Popov / Toma Junior Popov (first round)
3. (Scotland) Adam Hall / Alexander Dunn (first round)
4. (France) Fabien Delrue / William Villeger (second round)
5. (England) Callum Hemming / Steven Stallwood (first round)
6. (India) Krishna Prasad Garaga / Vishnuvardhan Goud Panjala (withdrew)
7. (Netherlands) Ruben Jille / Ties van der Lecq (champions)
8. (Scotland) Christopher Grimley / Matthew Grimley (quarter-finals)

=== Finals ===
Semi-finals
(Denmark) Joel Eipe (Denmark) Daniel Lundgaard	13	21	11
7	(Netherlands) Ruben Jille (Netherlands) Ties van der Lecq	21	14	21
(France) Eloi Adam (France) Julien Maio	18	16
(Malaysia) Junaidi Arif (Malaysia) Muhammad Haikal	21	21

Final
7	(Netherlands) Ruben Jille (Netherlands) Ties van der Lecq	w	/	o
(Malaysia) Junaidi Arif (Malaysia) Muhammad Haikal

=== Top half ===
==== Section 1 ====
First round
PFQ	(Malaysia) Loo B K (Malaysia) Lwi S H	23	8	21
PFQ	(Czech Republic) O Král (Czech Republic) A Mendrek	21	21	19
(Denmark) J Eipe (Denmark) D Lundgaard	21	21
(Algeria) M A Belarbi (Algeria) A Hamek	6	13
8	(Scotland) C Grimley (Scotland) M Grimley	21	21
PFQ	(England) A Gupta (England) B Yap	17	14
Q1	(Hong Kong) Law C H (Hong Kong) Lee C H	21	13	14
(Singapore) T Hee (Singapore) Loh K H	17	21	21

Second round
PFQ	(Malaysia) Loo B K (Malaysia) Lwi S H	21	18	14
(Denmark) J Eipe (Denmark) D Lundgaard	15	21	21
8	(Scotland) C Grimley (Scotland) M Grimley	21	21
(Singapore) T Hee (Singapore) Loh K H	14	16

Quarter-finals
(Denmark) J Eipe (Denmark) D Lundgaard	21	18	21
8	(Scotland) C Grimley (Scotland) M Grimley	19	21	18

==== Section 2 ====
First round
4	(France) F Delrue (France) W Villeger	21	21
Q2	(Denmark) K Kræmer (Denmark) M Rindshøj	18	19
(Malaysia) Chang Y J (Malaysia) Yap R K	21	17	21
(India) I Bhatnagar (India) K. Sai Pratheek	19	21	16
7	(Netherlands) R Jille (Netherlands) T van der Lecq	19	21	21
PFQ	(Italy) G Greco (Italy) K Strobl	21	12	12
(Singapore) D B Chrisnanta (Singapore) A Kwek	17	11
Q3	(Germany) B Geiss (Germany) D Hess	21	21

Second round
4	(France) F Delrue (France) W Villeger	15	15
(Malaysia) Chang Y J (Malaysia) Yap R K	21	21
7	(Netherlands) R Jille (Netherlands) T van der Lecq	21	21
Q3	(Germany) B Geiss (Germany) D Hess	14	15

Quarter-finals
(Malaysia) Chang Y J (Malaysia) Yap R K	17	21	18
7	(Netherlands) R Jille (Netherlands) T van der Lecq	21	18	21

=== Bottom half ===
==== Section 3 ====
First round
PFQ	(India) Vaibhaav (India) H.V. Nithin	19	17
Q4	(United States) V Chiu (United States) J Yuan	21	21
(India) P. S. Ravikrishna (India) S P Udayakumar	19	21	21
PFQ	(Germany) M Datko (Germany) P Scheiel	21	11	12
(France) E Adam (France) J Maio	21	14	21
(India) A George (India) S Shukla	19	21	17
(Denmark) E Lauritzen (Denmark) M Vestergaard	w	/	o
3	(Scotland) A Dunn (Scotland) A Hall

Second round
Q4	(United States) V Chiu (United States) J Yuan	15	15
(India) P. S. Ravikrishna (India) S P Udayakumar	21	21
(France) E Adam (France) J Maio	25	14	21
(Denmark) E Lauritzen (Denmark) M Vestergaard	23	21	8

Quarter-finals
(India) P. S. Ravikrishna (India) S P Udayakumar	21	12	20
(France) E Adam (France) J Maio	13	21	22

==== Section 4 ====
First round
(Czech Republic) J Janáček (Czech Republic) T Švejda	19	18
(England) R Easton (England) Z Russ	21	21
(France) L Corvée (France) R Labar	17	21	30
5	(England) C Hemming (England) S Stallwood	21	10	28
(India) V K H Ranganatha (India) A Surya	18	18
PFQ	(Indonesia) P A S Dadiara (Indonesia) B S Elohim	21	21
(Malaysia) J Arif (Malaysia) M Haikal	19	24	21
2	(France) C Popov (France) T J Popov	21	22	19

Second round
(England) R Easton (England) Z Russ	15	21	17
(France) L Corvée (France) R Labar	21	9	21
PFQ	(Indonesia) P A S Dadiara (Indonesia) B S Elohim	18	17
(Malaysia) J Arif (Malaysia) M Haikal	21	21

Quarter-finals
(France) L Corvée (France) R Labar	13	21	15
(Malaysia) J Arif (Malaysia) M Haikal	21	12	21

== Women's doubles ==
=== Seeds ===
1. (Bulgaria) Gabriela Stoeva / Stefani Stoeva (champions)
2. (Denmark) Amalie Magelund / Freja Ravn (withdrew)
3. (Germany) Linda Efler / Isabel Lohau (withdrew)
4. (Scotland) Julie MacPherson / Ciara Torrance (quarter-final)
5. (Indonesia) Apriyani Rahayu / Siti Fadia Silva Ramadhanti (withdrew)
6. (Netherlands) Debora Jille / Cheryl Seinen (withdrew)
7. (Malaysia) Anna Cheong / Teoh Mei Xing (second round)
8. (England) Chloe Birch / Jessica Pugh (semi-final)

=== Finals ===
Semi-finals
1	(Bulgaria) Gabriela Stoeva (Bulgaria) Stefani Stoeva	21	21
8	(England) Chloe Birch (England) Jessica Pugh	15	12
(Germany) Stine Küspert (Germany) Emma Moszczynski	21	18	24
(India) K. Ashwini Bhat (India) Shikha Gautam	16	21	22

Final
1	(Bulgaria) Gabriela Stoeva (Bulgaria) Stefani Stoeva	21	21
(Germany) Stine Küspert (Germany) Emma Moszczynski	15	14

=== Top half ===
==== Section 1 ====
First round
1	(Bulgaria) G Stoeva (Bulgaria) S Stoeva	21	21
(India) R Panda (India) S Panda	13	8
PFQ	(Scotland) E O'Donnell (England) L Tolman	18	15
Q3	(Malaysia) Go P K (Malaysia) Yap L	21	21
7	(Malaysia) A Cheong (Malaysia) Teoh M X	21	21
PFQ	(Denmark) A C Kudsk (Denmark) S Schulz	14	10
(Indonesia) R Hartawan (Indonesia) Y Y Susanto	18	15
(Canada) C Choi (Canada) J Wu	21	21

Second round
1	(Bulgaria) G Stoeva (Bulgaria) S Stoeva	21	21
Q3	(Malaysia) Go P K (Malaysia) Yap L	17	17
7	(Malaysia) A Cheong (Malaysia) Teoh M X	13	18
(Canada) C Choi (Canada) J Wu	21	21

Quarter-finals
1	(Bulgaria) G Stoeva (Bulgaria) S Stoeva	21	21
(Canada) C Choi (Canada) J Wu	13	15

==== Section 2 ====
First round
4	(Scotland) J MacPherson (Scotland) C Torrance	21	21
(France) M Lambert (France) A Tran	19	17
(Switzerland) A Müller (Switzerland) J Stadelmann	21	21
Q4	(France) R Cloteaux-Foucault (France) A Nambot	12	17
8	(England) C Birch (England) J Pugh	21	22
(Ukraine) M Stoliarenko (Ukraine) Y Zharka	7	20
PFQ	(Austria) S Au Yeong (Austria) K Hochmeir	9	18
(Malaysia) Low Y Y (Malaysia) V Siow	21	21

Second round
4	(Scotland) J MacPherson (Scotland) C Torrance	21	21
(Switzerland) A Müller (Switzerland) J Stadelmann	14	13
8	(England) C Birch (England) J Pugh	21	21
(Malaysia) Low Y Y (Malaysia) V Siow	8	14

Quarter-finals
4	(Scotland) J MacPherson (Scotland) C Torrance	21	19	10
8	(England) C Birch (England) J Pugh	14	21	21

=== Bottom half ===
==== Section 3 ====
First round
PFQ	(Singapore) Jin YJ (Singapore) C Wong	18	17
(Germany) S Küspert (Germany) E Moszczynski	21	21
(United States) F Corbett (United States) A Lee	21	21
PFQ	(France) T Margueritte (France) A Tatranova	11	6
(Spain) C Azurmendi (Spain) B Corrales	w	/	o
Q2
(Australia) K Ea (Australia) G Somerville	19	21	11
PFQ	(Hong Kong) Ng T Y (Hong Kong) Tsang H Y	21	16	21

Second round
(Germany) S Küspert (Germany) E Moszczynski	21	21
(United States) F Corbett (United States) A Lee	17	15
(Spain) C Azurmendi (Spain) B Corrales	14	21	11
PFQ	(Hong Kong) Ng T Y (Hong Kong) Tsang H Y	21	18	21

Quarter-finals
(Germany) S Küspert (Germany) E Moszczynski	21	21
PFQ	(Hong Kong) Ng T Y (Hong Kong) Tsang H Y	18	16

==== Section 4 ====
First round
Q1	(France) C Cheng (France) C Yvenat	7	15
PFQ	(Sweden) M Sjöö (Sweden) T Sjöö	21	21
(Germany) L Michalski (Germany) F Volkmann	21	21
PFQ	(Switzerland) N Fankhauser (Switzerland) C Racloz	17	12
(Denmark) C Busch (Denmark) A Schulz	23	12	10
(India) K. Ashwini Bhat (India) S Gautam	21	21	21
(Denmark) N P. Anthonisen (Denmark) C Graversen	21	19	19
PFQ	(France) F Vallet (France) E Vercelot	12	21	21

Second round
PFQ	(Sweden) M Sjöö (Sweden) T Sjöö	21	22
(Germany) L Michalski (Germany) F Volkmann	15	20
(India) K. Ashwini Bhat (India) S Gautam	21	28
PFQ	(France) F Vallet (France) E Vercelot	12	26

Quarter-finals
PFQ	(Sweden) M Sjöö (Sweden) T Sjöö	21	10	11
(India) K. Ashwini Bhat (India) S Gautam	19	21	21

== Mixed doubles ==
=== Seeds ===
1. (France) Thom Gicquel / Delphine Delrue (withdrew)
2. (Germany) Mark Lamsfuß / Isabel Lohau (withdrew)
3. (Netherlands) Robin Tabeling / Selena Piek (withdrew)
4. (Denmark) Mikkel Mikkelsen / Rikke Søby Hansen (first round)
5. (Malaysia) Chan Peng Soon / Toh Ee Wei (first round)
6. (Germany) Jones Ralfy Jansen / Linda Efler (withdrew)
7. (India) Ishaan Bhatnagar / Tanisha Crasto (quarter-final)
8. (Singapore) Terry Hee / Tan Wei Han (champions)

=== Finals ===
Semi-finals
8	(Singapore) Terry Hee (Singapore) Tan Wei Han	21	21
PFQ	(France) Fabien Delrue (France) Vimala Hériau	13	12
(Indonesia) Rehan Naufal Kusharjanto (Indonesia) Lisa Ayu Kusumawati	21	21
PFQ	(Malaysia) Yap Roy King (Malaysia) Teoh Mei Xing	16	15

Final
8	(Singapore) Terry Hee (Singapore) Tan Wei Han	21	16	21
(Indonesia) Rehan Naufal Kusharjanto (Indonesia) Lisa Ayu Kusumawati	12	21	13

=== Top half ===
==== Section 1 ====
First round
PFQ	(Denmark) E Hybel (Denmark) M Surrow	21	21
PFQ	(Austria) P Birker (Austria) K Hochmeir	17	16
Q4	(Hong Kong) Lee C H (Hong Kong) Ng T Y	22	18	21
(Scotland) A Dunn (Scotland) C Torrance	20	21	11
8	(Singapore) T Hee (Singapore) Tan W H	18	21	21
(France) W Villeger (France) A Tran	21	14	19
(England) C Hemming (England) J Pugh	21	19	21
(United States) V Chiu (United States) J Gai	15	21	10

Second round
PFQ	(Denmark) E Hybel (Denmark) M Surrow	20	13
Q4	(Hong Kong) Lee C H (Hong Kong) Ng T Y	22	21
8	(Singapore) T Hee (Singapore) Tan W H	21	21
(England) C Hemming (England) J Pugh	18	18

Quarter-finals
Q4	(Hong Kong) Lee C H (Hong Kong) Ng T Y	21	14	13
8	(Singapore) T Hee (Singapore) Tan W H	15	21	21

==== Section 2 ====
First round
PFQ	(Canada) T A Lindeman (Canada) J Wu	15	14
(Indonesia) A B Cahyono (Indonesia) M G Islami	21	21
(Netherlands) W van der Aar (Netherlands) I van der Aar	16	17
(Indonesia) A Syahnawi (Indonesia) W O Kandow	21	21
PFQ	(France) F Delrue (France) V Hériau	w	/	o
(Scotland) A Hall (Scotland) J MacPherson
(Germany) P Scheiel (Germany) F Volkmann	15	14
(Scotland) C Grimley (Scotland) E O'Donnell	21	21

Second round
(Indonesia) A B Cahyono (Indonesia) M G Islami	21	21
(Indonesia) A Syahnawi (Indonesia) W O Kandow	13	19
PFQ	(France) F Delrue (France) V Hériau	21	21
(Scotland) C Grimley (Scotland) E O'Donnell	18	17

Quarter-finals
(Indonesia) A B Cahyono (Indonesia) M G Islami	9	15
PFQ	(France) F Delrue (France) V Hériau	21	21

=== Bottom half ===
==== Section 3 ====
First round
(Finland) A Kaisti (Czech Republic) A Bášová	19	21	21
Q2	(England) R Easton (England) A Lado	21	17	9
(Indonesia) Z J Sumanti (Indonesia) H Julimarbela	22	18	21
5	(Malaysia) Chan P S (Malaysia) Toh E W	20	21	18
(Denmark) M Thyrri (Denmark) A Magelund	21	21
PFQ	(Hong Kong) Law C H (Hong Kong) Yeung N T	12	19
(Indonesia) R N Kusharjanto (Indonesia) L A Kusumawati	21	21
4	(Denmark) M Mikkelsen (Denmark) R Søby Hansen	19	11

Second round
(Finland) A Kaisti (Czech Republic) A Bášová	22	22
(Indonesia) Z J Sumanti (Indonesia) H Julimarbela	20	20
(Denmark) M Thyrri (Denmark) A Magelund	21	15	8
(Indonesia) R N Kusharjanto (Indonesia) L A Kusumawati	14	21	21

Quarter-finals
(Finland) A Kaisti (Czech Republic) A Bášová	18	10
(Indonesia) R N Kusharjanto (Indonesia) L A Kusumawati	21	21

==== Section 4 ====
First round
(Netherlands) T van der Lecq (Netherlands) D Jille	20	23	21
(Denmark) R Espersen (Denmark) C Busch	22	21	13
(India) A Surya (India) S Panda	8	10
7	(India) I Bhatnagar (India) T Crasto	21	21
(India) H. V. Nithin (India) R Panda	11	17
Q3	(Singapore) A Kwek (Singapore) Jin YJ	21	21
Q1	(Denmark) M Vestergaard (Denmark) N P Anthonisen	22	15
PFQ	(Malaysia) Yap R K (Malaysia) Teoh M X	24	21

Second round
(Netherlands) T van der Lecq (Netherlands) D Jille	18	20
7	(India) I Bhatnagar (India) T Crasto	21	22
Q3	(Singapore) A Kwek (Singapore) Jin YJ	17	21	18
PFQ	(Malaysia) Yap R K (Malaysia) Teoh M X	21	15	21

Quarter-finals
7	(India) I Bhatnagar (India) T Crasto	7	13
PFQ	(Malaysia) Yap R K (Malaysia) Teoh M X	21	21

Preceded by 2022 Swiss Open	BWF World Tour; 2022 BWF season	Succeeded by 2022 Korea Open
