= 2022 European Badminton Championships =

Tournament details
- Dates: April 25, 2022 – April 30, 2022
- Venue: Polideportivo Municipal Gallur
- Location: Madrid, Spain

Champions
- Men's singles: (Denmark) Viktor Axelsen
- Women's singles: (Spain) Carolina Marín
- Men's doubles: (Germany) Mark Lamsfuß (Germany) Marvin Seidel
- Women's doubles: (Bulgaria) Gabriela Stoeva (Bulgaria) Stefani Stoeva
- Mixed doubles: (Germany) Mark Lamsfuß (Germany) Isabel Lohau

The 2022 European Badminton Championships was the 29th tournament of the European Badminton Championships. It was held in Madrid, Spain, from 25 to 30 April 2022.

== Tournament ==
The 2022 European Badminton Championships was the 29th edition of the championships. The tournament was organized by the Badminton Europe with the local organizer Spanish Badminton Federation and sanctioned by the BWF.

The tournament consisted of men's (singles and doubles), women's (singles and doubles), and mixed doubles.

Finland was originally announced as the host for this championships during the 2021 European Mixed Team Badminton Championships, but withdrew due to COVID-19-related concerns.

=== Venue ===
The tournament was held at the Polideportivo Municipal Gallur in Madrid, Spain.

=== Point distribution ===
Below are the tables with the point distribution for each phase of the tournament based on the BWF points system for the European Badminton Championships, which is equivalent to a Super 500 event.

Winner	Runner-up	3/4	5/8	9/16	17/32	33/64
9,200	7,800	6,420	5,040	3,600	2,220	880

== Medal summary ==
=== Medalists ===
Event	Gold	Silver	Bronze
Men's singles	(Denmark) Viktor Axelsen	(Denmark) Anders Antonsen	(Israel) Misha Zilberman
Men's singles	(Denmark) Viktor Axelsen	(Denmark) Anders Antonsen	(France) Toma Junior Popov
Women's singles	(Spain) Carolina Marín	(Scotland) Kirsty Gilmour	(Turkey) Neslihan Yiğit
Women's singles	(Spain) Carolina Marín	(Scotland) Kirsty Gilmour	(Denmark) Mia Blichfeldt
Men's doubles	(Germany) Mark Lamsfuß (Germany) Marvin Seidel	(Scotland) Alexander Dunn (Scotland) Adam Hall	(Netherlands) Ruben Jille (Netherlands) Ties van der Lecq
Men's doubles	(Germany) Mark Lamsfuß (Germany) Marvin Seidel	(Scotland) Alexander Dunn (Scotland) Adam Hall	(England) Ben Lane (England) Sean Vendy
Women's doubles	(Bulgaria) Gabriela Stoeva (Bulgaria) Stefani Stoeva	(Germany) Linda Efler (Germany) Isabel Lohau	(Denmark) Maiken Fruergaard (Denmark) Sara Thygesen
Women's doubles	(Bulgaria) Gabriela Stoeva (Bulgaria) Stefani Stoeva	(Germany) Linda Efler (Germany) Isabel Lohau	(Denmark) Amalie Magelund (Denmark) Freja Ravn
Mixed doubles	(Germany) Mark Lamsfuß (Germany) Isabel Lohau	(France) Thom Gicquel (France) Delphine Delrue	(Denmark) Mikkel Mikkelsen (Denmark) Rikke Søby Hansen
Mixed doubles	(Germany) Mark Lamsfuß (Germany) Isabel Lohau	(France) Thom Gicquel (France) Delphine Delrue	(Netherlands) Robin Tabeling (Netherlands) Selena Piek

=== Medal table ===
* Host nation (Spain)

Rank	Nation	Gold	Silver	Bronze	Total
1	Germany	2	1	0	3
2	Denmark	1	1	4	6
3	Bulgaria	1	0	0	1
3	Spain*	1	0	0	1
5	Scotland	0	2	0	2
6	France	0	1	1	2
7	Netherlands	0	0	2	2
8	England	0	0	1	1
8	Israel	0	0	1	1
8	Turkey	0	0	1	1
Totals (10 entries)		5	5	10	20

== Participants ==
216 players from 35 nations will participate this championship.

Participants of 2022 European Badminton Championships
Nation	MS	WS	MD	WD	XD	Total	Players
Austria	1	1		1	1	4	5
Azerbaijan	1		1			2	2
Belgium	2	1				3	3
Bulgaria	1	2	1	1	1	6	7
Croatia	1		1			2	2
Cyprus		1	1	1		3	5
Czech Republic	1	2	2	1	0.5	6.5	9
Denmark	3	4	2	3	2	14	21
England	1	2	3	1	2	9	13
Estonia	1	1	1	1	1	5	8
Finland	1		1		0.5	2.5	3
France	4	3	3	2	2	9	12
Germany	2	1	2	2	2	9	12
Greece	1				1	2	3
Hungary	1	2				3	3
Iceland	1				1	2	3
Ireland	1	1	1	1	1	5	6
Israel	1	1			1	3	3
Italy	1	1	1	2		5	7
Latvia				1		1	2
Malta	1					1	
Moldova	1	1				2	2
Netherlands	2	1	1	1	2	7	9
Norway	1		1	1	1	4	7
Poland	1			1	1	3	5
Portugal	1	1		1		3	3
Scotland	1	1	2	1	2	7	9
Serbia		1			1	2	3
Slovakia	1	1		1		3	3
Slovenia	1	1		1	1	4	5
Spain (H)	2	3	2	1	1	9	11
Sweden	1	1	1	1	1	5	7
Switzerland	1	1		1	1	4	5
Turkey		2				2	2
Ukraine	1	2	1	1	1	6	9
Total (35 NOCs)	40	39	28	28	28	163	216

== Men's singles ==
=== Seeds ===
1. (Denmark) Viktor Axelsen (champion)
2. (Denmark) Anders Antonsen (final)
3. (Denmark) Hans-Kristian Vittinghus (quarter-finals)
4. (Netherlands) Mark Caljouw (third round)
5. (France) Toma Junior Popov (semi-finals)
6. (France) Brice Leverdez (quarter-finals)
7. (France) Thomas Rouxel (quarter-finals)
8. (Republic of Ireland) Nhat Nguyen (quarter-finals)

=== Wild card ===
Badminton Europe (BEC) awarded a wild card entry to Alex Lanier of France.

=== Finals ===
Semi-finals
1	(Denmark) Viktor Axelsen	21	21
(Israel) Misha Zilberman	10	11
5	(France) Toma Junior Popov	16	21	15
2	(Denmark) Anders Antonsen	21	19	21

Final
1	(Denmark) Viktor Axelsen	21	21
2	(Denmark) Anders Antonsen	17	15

=== Top half ===
==== Section 1 ====
First round
(Hungary) G Pytel	21	21
(Moldova) C Savin	15	8
(Slovenia) M Ivanič	17	11
(England) T Penty	21	21

Second round
1	(Denmark) V Axelsen	21	21
WC	(France) A Lanier	12	11
(Germany) M Weißkirchen	21	21
(Hungary) G Pytel	11	17
7	(France) T Rouxel	21	21
(Belgium) J Carraggi	11	12
(Spain) P Abián	16	21	18
(England) T Penty	21	11	21

Third round
1	(Denmark) V Axelsen	w	/	o
(Germany) M Weißkirchen
7	(France) T Rouxel	22	21
(England) T Penty	20	12

Quarter-finals
1	(Denmark) V Axelsen	21	21
7	(France) T Rouxel	16	14

==== Section 2 ====
First round
(Croatia) L Ban	21	18
(Israel) M Zilberman	23	21
(Estonia) K Kert	14	13
(Slovakia) M Dratva	21	21

Second round
4	(Netherlands) M Caljouw	22	17	21
(Finland) K Koljonen	20	21	10
(Iceland) K Gunnarsson	20	16
(Israel) M Zilberman	22	21
6	(France) B Leverdez	21	21
(Austria) L Wraber	15	18
(Norway) M Barth	12	16
(Slovakia) M Dratva	21	21

Third round
4	(Netherlands) M Caljouw	16	21	16
(Israel) M Zilberman	21	15	21
6	(France) B Leverdez	24	16	21
(Slovakia) M Dratva	22	21	16

Quarter-finals
(Israel) M Zilberman	21	21
6	(France) B Leverdez	18	15

=== Bottom half ===
==== Section 3 ====
First round
(Italy) F Caponio	21	21
(Scotland) C Smith	15	3
(Greece) S Tsigirdakis	12	11
(Switzerland) T Künzi	21	21

Second round
(Italy) F Caponio	21	16	21
(Sweden) F Burestedt	19	21	23
(Portugal) B Atilano	16	11
5	(France) T J Popov	21	21
(Switzerland) T Künzi	21	21
(Malta) M Abela	12	7
(Bulgaria) D Nikolov	21	10	17
3	(Denmark) H-K Vittinghus	12	21	21

Third round
(Sweden) F Burestedt	16	7
5	(France) T J Popov	21	21
(Switzerland) T Künzi	21	24	12
3	(Denmark) H-K Vittinghus	17	26	21

Quarter-finals
5	(France) T J Popov	20	21	21
3	(Denmark) H-K Vittinghus	22	14	13

==== Section 4 ====
First round
(Poland) M Szymanowski	6	15
(Netherlands) J Kweekel	21	21
(Czech Republic) J Louda	21	21
(Belgium) M Moreels	12	12

Second round
(Netherlands) J Kweekel	21	21
(Ukraine) D Bosniuk	16	14
(Azerbaijan) A R Dwicahyo	10	14
8	(Republic of Ireland) N Nguyen	21	21
(Czech Republic) J Louda	17	21	10
(Spain) L E Peñalver	21	18	21
(Germany) K Schäfer	17	21	13
2	(Denmark) A Antonsen	21	18	21

Third round
(Netherlands) J Kweekel	15	14
8	(Republic of Ireland) N Nguyen	21	21
(Spain) L E Peñalver	13	15
2	(Denmark) A Antonsen	21	21

Quarter-finals
8	(Republic of Ireland) N Nguyen	15	17
2	(Denmark) A Antonsen	21	21

== Women's singles ==
=== Seeds ===
1. (Spain) Carolina Marín (champion)
2. (Denmark) Mia Blichfeldt (semi-finals)
3. (Scotland) Kirsty Gilmour (final)
4. (Denmark) Line Christophersen (quarter-finals)
5. (Germany) Yvonne Li (third round)
6. (Turkey) Neslihan Yiğit (semi-finals)
7. (Denmark) Line Kjærsfeldt (quarter-finals)
8. (Belgium) Lianne Tan (quarter-finals)

=== Finals ===
Semi-finals
1	(Spain) Carolina Marín	21	21
6	(Turkey) Neslihan Yiğit	14	13
3	(Scotland) Kirsty Gilmour	21	19	21
2	(Denmark) Mia Blichfeldt	19	21	10

Final
1	(Spain) Carolina Marín	21	21
3	(Scotland) Kirsty Gilmour	10	12

=== Top half ===
==== Section 1 ====
First round
(Spain) B Corrales	20	21	21
(Israel) K Polikarpova	22	17	17

Second round
1	(Spain) C Marín	21	21
(Czech Republic) K Tomalová	10	6
(Portugal) S Gonçalves	21	17	16
(Ukraine) M Ulitina	19	21	21
7	(Denmark) L Kjærsfeldt	21	21
(France) M Batomene	10	11
(Serbia) M Sudimac	9	8
(Spain) B Corrales	21	21

Third round
1	(Spain) C Marín	21	21
(Ukraine) M Ulitina	7	8
7	(Denmark) L Kjærsfeldt	21	21
(Spain) B Corrales	12	12

Quarter-finals
1	(Spain) C Marín	21	14	21
7	(Denmark) L Kjærsfeldt	11	21	17

==== Section 2 ====
First round
(England) F Redfearn	21	21
(Bulgaria) H Popovska	13	12
(Republic of Ireland) R Darragh	21	21
(Hungary) V Sándorházi	16	18

Second round
4	(Denmark) L Christophersen	21	21
(Slovenia) P Polanc	14	11
(France) L Huet	18	21	21
(England) F Redfearn	21	19	17
6	(Turkey) N Yiğit	21	21
(Italy) Y Hamza	11	9
(Austria) K Neudolt	5	6
(Republic of Ireland) R Darragh	21	21

Third round
4	(Denmark) L Christophersen	21	23
(France) L Huet	16	21
6	(Turkey) N Yiğit	21	21
(Republic of Ireland) R Darragh	16	12

Quarter-finals
4	(Denmark) L Christophersen	10	21	15
6	(Turkey) N Yiğit	21	15	21

=== Bottom half ===
==== Section 3 ====
First round
(Bulgaria) M Mitsova	21	14	21
(Spain) C Azurmendi	13	21	17
(Estonia) K Kuuba	21	21
(Cyprus) E Christodoulou	8	16

Second round
(Bulgaria) M Mitsova	21	21
(Moldova) V Ginga	11	9
(Switzerland) J Stadelmann	14	17
8	(Belgium) L Tan	21	21
(Estonia) K Kuuba	21	21
(England) A Holden	18	17
(Netherlands) G Mahulette	16	11
3	(Scotland) K Gilmour	21	21

Third round
(Bulgaria) M Mitsova	21	9	16
8	(Belgium) L Tan	8	21	21
(Estonia) K Kuuba	21	9	15
3	(Scotland) K Gilmour	18	21	21

Quarter-finals
8	(Belgium) L Tan	13	21	15
3	(Scotland) K Gilmour	21	12	21

==== Section 4 ====
First round
(Slovakia) M Repiská	16	17
(Turkey) A Demirbağ	21	21
(Czech Republic) T Švábíková	21	21
(Hungary) Á Körösi	15	8

Second round
(Turkey) A Demirbağ	10	8
(France) Qi XF	21	21
(Sweden) E Urell	9	18
5	(Germany) Y Li	21	21
(Czech Republic) T Švábíková	16	13
(Denmark) J D Jakobsen	21	21
(Ukraine) P Buhrova	13	7
2	(Denmark) M Blichfeldt	21	21

Third round
(France) Qi XF	21	21
5	(Germany) Y Li	13	15
(Denmark) J D Jakobsen	21	11	17
2	(Denmark) M Blichfeldt	14	21	21

Quarter-finals
(France) Qi XF	21	10	17
2	(Denmark) M Blichfeldt	16	21	21

== Men's doubles ==
=== Seeds ===
1. (Denmark) Kim Astrup / Anders Skaarup Rasmussen (withdrew)
2. (Germany) Mark Lamsfuß / Marvin Seidel (champions)
3. (England) Ben Lane / Sean Vendy (semi-finals)
4. (France) Christo Popov / Toma Junior Popov (quarter-finals)
5. (Denmark) Jeppe Bay / Lasse Mølhede (quarter-finals)
6. (Scotland) Alexander Dunn / Adam Hall (final)
7. (France) Fabien Delrue / William Villeger (quarter-finals)
8. (Netherlands) Ruben Jille / Ties van der Lecq (semi-finals)

=== Wild card ===
Badminton Europe (BEC) awarded a wild card entry to José Molares and Jaume Pérez of Spain.

=== Finals ===
Semi-finals

Final

8
- (Netherlands) Ruben Jille
- (Netherlands) Ties van der Lecq
10
20

6
- (Scotland) Alexander Dunn
- (Scotland) Adam Hall
21
22

6
- (Scotland) Alexander Dunn
- (Scotland) Adam Hall
17
16

2
- (Germany) Mark Lamsfuß
- (Germany) Marvin Seidel
21
21

3
- (England) Ben Lane
- (England) Sean Vendy
21
17

2
- (Germany) Mark Lamsfuß
- (Germany) Marvin Seidel
23
21

=== Top half ===
==== Section 1 ====
First round

Second round

Quarter-finals

1
- (Denmark) K Astrup
- (Denmark) A S Rasmussen

- (Norway) T Flåtten
- (Norway) V Rikheim
w
/
o

- (Norway) T Flåtten
- (Norway) V Rikheim
22
17
21

- (Estonia) K Kaljurand
- (Estonia) R Käsner
20
21
14

- (Norway) T Flåtten
- (Norway) V Rikheim
13
13

8
- (Netherlands) R Jille
- (Netherlands) T van der Lecq
21
21

8
- (Netherlands) R Jille
- (Netherlands) T van der Lecq
11
21
21

- (England) C Hemming
- (England) S Stallwood
21
13
17

8
- (Netherlands) R Jille
- (Netherlands) T van der Lecq
21
21

- (Czech Republic) O Král
- (Czech Republic) A Mendrek
17
17

- (Sweden) J Hansson
- (Sweden) M Z-Bexell
28
17
17

- (Czech Republic) O Král
- (Czech Republic) A Mendrek
26
21
21

==== Section 2 ====
First round

Second round

Quarter-finals

4
- (France) C Popov
- (France) T J Popov
21
22

- (Spain) J Monroy
- (Spain) C Piris
10
20

- (Spain) J Monroy
- (Spain) C Piris
21
21

- (Germany) M Datko
- (Germany) P Scheiel
10
8

4
- (France) C Popov
- (France) T J Popov
16
13

6
- (Scotland) A Dunn
- (Scotland) A Hall
21
21

6
- (Scotland) A Dunn
- (Scotland) A Hall
21
21

- (Croatia) L Ban
- (Croatia) F Špoljarec
15
19

6
- (Scotland) A Dunn
- (Scotland) A Hall
10
21
21

- (France) L Corvée
- (France) R Labar
21
12
18

- (France) L Corvée
- (France) R Labar
19
21
21

- (Bulgaria) I Rusev
- (Bulgaria) I Stoynov
21
9
9

=== Bottom half ===
==== Section 3 ====
First round

Second round

Quarter-finals

WC
- (Spain) J Molares
- (Spain) J Pérez
14
8

- (Scotland) C Grimley
- (Scotland) M Grimley
21
21

- (Scotland) C Grimley
- (Scotland) M Grimley
18
14

5
- (Denmark) J Bay
- (Denmark) L Mølhede
21
21

- (Republic of Ireland) J Magee
- (Republic of Ireland) P Reynolds
19
12

5
- (Denmark) J Bay
- (Denmark) L Mølhede
21
21

5
- (Denmark) J Bay
- (Denmark) L Mølhede
14
21

3
- (England) B Lane
- (England) S Vendy
21
23

- (Italy) G Greco
- (Italy) K Strobl
13
16

- (Azerbaijan) A R Dwicahyo
- (Azerbaijan) A Qowimuramadhoni
21
21

- (Azerbaijan) A R Dwicahyo
- (Azerbaijan) A Qowimuramadhoni
22
17
10

3
- (England) B Lane
- (England) S Vendy
20
21
21

==== Section 4 ====
First round

Second round

Quarter-finals

- (Finland) A Kaisti
- (Finland) J Paul
21
23

- (Czech Republic) J Janáček
- (Czech Republic) T Švejda
16
21

- (Finland) A Kaisti
- (Finland) J Paul
10
22
14

7
- (France) F Delrue
- (France) W Villeger
21
20
21

- (Cyprus) A Ioannou
- (Cyprus) C Temereas
8
9

7
- (France) F Delrue
- (France) W Villeger
21
21

7
- (France) F Delrue
- (France) W Villeger
17
18

2
- (Germany) M Lamsfuß
- (Germany) M Seidel
21
21

- (England) R Easton
- (England) Z Russ
21
21

- (Ukraine) G Beketov
- (Ukraine) M Makhnovskiy
8
14

- (England) R Easton
- (England) Z Russ
18
18

2
- (Germany) M Lamsfuß
- (Germany) M Seidel
21
21

== Women's doubles ==
=== Seeds ===
1. (Bulgaria) Gabriela Stoeva / Stefani Stoeva (champions)
2. (Denmark) Maiken Fruergaard / Sara Thygesen (semi-finals)
3. (Denmark) Amalie Magelund / Freja Ravn (semi-finals)
4. (Germany) Linda Efler / Isabel Lohau (final)
5. (Scotland) Julie MacPherson / Ciara Torrance (first round)
6. (Netherlands) Debora Jille / Cheryl Seinen (quarter-finals)
7. (Sweden) Johanna Magnusson / Clara Nistad (quarter-finals)
8. (Denmark) Christine Busch / Amalie Schulz (quarter-finals)

=== Wild card ===
Badminton Europe (BEC) awarded a wild card entry to Chloe Birch and Jessica Pugh of England.

=== Finals ===
Semi-finals

Final

1
- (Bulgaria) Gabriela Stoeva
- (Bulgaria) Stefani Stoeva
21
21

3
- (Denmark) Amalie Magelund
- (Denmark) Freja Ravn
11
12

1
- (Bulgaria) Gabriela Stoeva
- (Bulgaria) Stefani Stoeva
21
21

4
- (Germany) Linda Efler
- (Germany) Isabel Lohau
14
10

4
- (Germany) Linda Efler
- (Germany) Isabel Lohau
20
21
22

2
- (Denmark) Maiken Fruergaard
- (Denmark) Sara Thygesen
22
15
20

=== Top half ===
==== Section 1 ====
First round

Second round

Quarter-finals

1
- (Bulgaria) G Stoeva
- (Bulgaria) S Stoeva
21
21

- (France) F Vallet
- (France) E Vercelot
12
10

- (Spain) C Azurmendi
- (Spain) B Corrales
21
18
16

- (France) F Vallet
- (France) E Vercelot
10
21
21

1
- (Bulgaria) G Stoeva
- (Bulgaria) S Stoeva
21
21

6
- (Netherlands) D Jille
- (Netherlands) C Seinen
16
13

6
- (Netherlands) D Jille
- (Netherlands) C Seinen
21
21

- (Switzerland) A Müller
- (Switzerland) J Stadelmann
15
17

6
- (Netherlands) D Jille
- (Netherlands) C Seinen
21
18
21

WC
- (England) C Birch
- (England) J Pugh
10
21
17

- (Latvia) A Babre
- (Latvia) A Priedniece
4
8

WC
- (England) C Birch
- (England) J Pugh
21
21

==== Section 2 ====
First round

Second round

Quarter-finals

3
- (Denmark) A Magelund
- (Denmark) F Ravn
21
21

- (Italy) M Corsini
- (Italy) J Mair
11
14

- (Italy) M Corsini
- (Italy) J Mair
21
21

- (Portugal) A F. Gonçalves
- (Portugal) S Gonçalves
12
10

3
- (Denmark) A Magelund
- (Denmark) F Ravn
21
9
21

7
- (Sweden) J Magnusson
- (Sweden) C Nistad
14
21
18

7
- (Sweden) J Magnusson
- (Sweden) C Nistad
21
21

- (Cyprus) E Kattirtzi
- (Cyprus) I Pissi
17
6

7
- (Sweden) J Magnusson
- (Sweden) C Nistad
21
21

- (Ukraine) M Stoliarenko
- (Ukraine) Y Zharka
14
17

- (Germany) S Küspert
- (Germany) E Moszczynski

- (Ukraine) M Stoliarenko
- (Ukraine) Y Zharka
w
/
o

=== Bottom half ===
==== Section 3 ====
First round

Second round

Quarter-finals

- (Slovakia) M Repiská
- (Slovakia) K Vargová

- (Norway) M Christensen
- (Norway) A Hong
w
/
o

- (Norway) M Christensen
- (Norway) A Hong
10
18

8
- (Denmark) C Busch
- (Denmark) A Schulz
21
21

- (Austria) S Au Yeong
- (Austria) K Hochmeir
15
9

8
- (Denmark) C Busch
- (Denmark) A Schulz
21
21

8
- (Denmark) C Busch
- (Denmark) A Schulz
9
21
13

4
- (Germany) L Efler
- (Germany) I Lohau
21
13
21

- (Italy) K Fink
- (Italy) Y Hamza
21
22

- (Czech Republic) A Bášová
- (Czech Republic) M Fuchsová
16
20

- (Italy) K Fink
- (Italy) Y Hamza
15
17

4
- (Germany) L Efler
- (Germany) I Lohau
21
21

==== Section 4 ====
First round

Second round

Quarter-finals

- (Slovenia) N Arih
- (Slovenia) L Salehar

- (Poland) D Kwaśnik
- (Poland) K Marczak
w
/
o

- (Poland) D Kwaśnik
- (Poland) K Marczak
6
14

- (France) M Lambert
- (France) A Tran
21
21

- (France) M Lambert
- (France) A Tran
21
21

5
- (Scotland) J MacPherson
- (Scotland) C Torrance
10
15

- (France) M Lambert
- (France) A Tran
21
16
17

2
- (Denmark) M Fruergaard
- (Denmark) S Thygesen
19
21
21

- (Republic of Ireland) K Frost
- (Republic of Ireland) M Ryan
18
21
5

- (Estonia) K-K Marran
- (Estonia) H Rüütel
21
15
21

- (Estonia) K-K Marran
- (Estonia) H Rüütel
22
11

2
- (Denmark) M Fruergaard
- (Denmark) S Thygesen
24
21

== Mixed doubles ==
=== Seeds ===
1. (England) Marcus Ellis / Lauren Smith (quarter-finals)
2. (France) Thom Gicquel / Delphine Delrue (final)
3. (Denmark) Mathias Christiansen / Alexandra Bøje(quarter-finals)
4. (Germany) Mark Lamsfuß / Isabel Lohau (champions)
5. (Netherlands) Robin Tabeling / Selena Piek (semi-finals)
6. (Denmark) Mikkel Mikkelsen / Rikke Søby Hansen (semi-finals)
7. (Scotland) Adam Hall / Julie MacPherson (quarter-finals)
8. (England) Callum Hemming / Jessica Pugh (quarter-finals)

=== Wild card ===
Badminton Europe (BEC) awarded a wild card entry to Alberto Zapico and Lorena Uslé of Spain.

=== Finals ===
Semi-finals

Final

6
- (Denmark) Mikkel Mikkelsen
- (Denmark) Rikke Søby Hansen
21
16
17

4
- (Germany) Mark Lamsfuß
- (Germany) Isabel Lohau
12
21
21

4
- (Germany) Mark Lamsfuß
- (Germany) Isabel Lohau
16
22
21

2
- (France) Thom Gicquel
- (France) Delphine Delrue
21
20
16

5
- (Netherlands) Robin Tabeling
- (Netherlands) Selena Piek
19
15

2
- (France) Thom Gicquel
- (France) Delphine Delrue
21
21

=== Top half ===
==== Section 1 ====
First round

Second round

Quarter-finals

1
- (England) M Ellis
- (England) L Smith
13
21
21

- (France) W Villeger
- (France) A Tran
21
16
19

- (France) W Villeger
- (France) A Tran
21
21

- (Slovenia) M Ivančič
- (Slovenia) P Polanc
18
17

1
- (England) M Ellis
- (England) L Smith
11
17

6
- (Denmark) M Mikkelsen
- (Denmark) R Søby Hansen
21
21

6
- (Denmark) M Mikkelsen
- (Denmark) R Søby Hansen
21
17
21

- (Finland) A Kaisti
- (Czech Republic) A Bášová
17
21
19

6
- (Denmark) M Mikkelsen
- (Denmark) R Søby Hansen
21
21

- (Poland) P Śmiłowski
- (Poland) W Adamek
18
9

- (Poland) P Śmiłowski
- (Poland) W Adamek
21
22
21

- (Switzerland) N A. Müller
- (Switzerland) R Stern
17
24
13

==== Section 2 ====
First round

Second round

Quarter-finals

4
- (Germany) M Lamsfuß
- (Germany) I Lohau
21
21

- (Netherlands) T van der Lecq
- (Netherlands) D Jille
14
18

- (Sweden) M Z-Bexell
- (Sweden) T Sjöö
16
21
18

- (Netherlands) T van der Lecq
- (Netherlands) D Jille
21
17
21

4
- (Germany) M Lamsfuß
- (Germany) I Lohau
25
21

7
- (Scotland) A Hall
- (Scotland) J MacPherson
23
17

7
- (Scotland) A Hall
- (Scotland) J MacPherson
21
21

- (Greece) P Tentas
- (Greece) E Moutevelidou
6
2

7
- (Scotland) A Hall
- (Scotland) J MacPherson
21
21

- (Serbia) M Tomic
- (Serbia) A Vitman
10
14

- (Serbia) M Tomic
- (Serbia) A Vitman
21
21

- (Republic of Ireland) P Reynolds
- (Republic of Ireland) R Darragh
15
19

=== Bottom half ===
==== Section 3 ====
First round

Second round

Quarter-finals

- (Israel) M Zilberman
- (Israel) S Zilberman
24
13
21

- (Ukraine) V Yakovlev
- (Ukraine) P Tkach
22
21
19

- (Israel) M Zilberman
- (Israel) S Zilberman
15
7

5
- (Netherlands) R Tabeling
- (Netherlands) S Piek
21
21

- (Scotland) C Grimley
- (Scotland) E O'Donnell
9
13

5
- (Netherlands) R Tabeling
- (Netherlands) S Piek
21
21

5
- (Netherlands) R Tabeling
- (Netherlands) S Piek
18
21
21

3
- (Denmark) M Christiansen
- (Denmark) A Bøje
21
17
14

- (Austria) P Birker
- (Austria) K Hochmeir
21
21

- (Iceland) D Johannesson
- (Iceland) S Árnadóttir
14
9

- (Austria) P Birker
- (Austria) K Hochmeir
11
11

3
- (Denmark) M Christiansen
- (Denmark) A Bøje
21
21

==== Section 4 ====
First round

Second round

Quarter-finals

- (Bulgaria) I Stoynov
- (Bulgaria) H Popovska
21
21

- (Norway) C C Mork
- (Norway) S F Jørgensen
15
16

- (Bulgaria) I Stoynov
- (Bulgaria) H Popovska
16
16

8
- (England) C Hemming
- (England) J Pugh
21
21

- (Estonia) O Männik
- (Estonia) R Üprus
10
3

8
- (England) C Hemming
- (England) J Pugh
21
21

8
- (England) C Hemming
- (England) J Pugh
15
21
8

2
- (France) T Gicquel
- (France) D Delrue
21
17
21

WC
- (Spain) A Zapico
- (Spain) L Uslé
10
14

- (Germany) J R Jansen
- (Germany) L Efler
21
21

- (Germany) J R Jansen
- (Germany) L Efler
18
21
11

2
- (France) T Gicquel
- (France) D Delrue
21
16
21
