= Ruben Jille =

Dutch badminton player

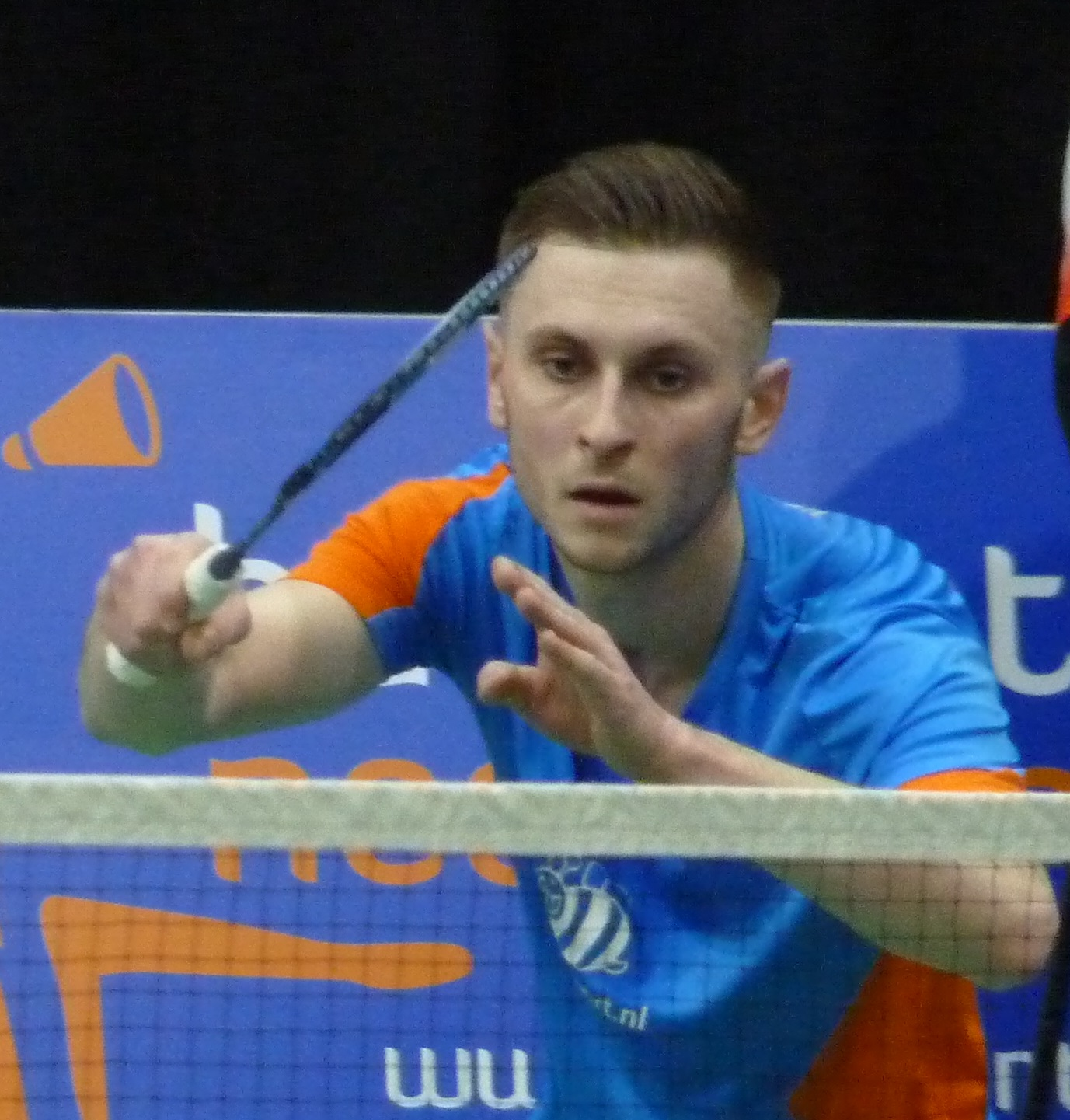

Personal information
- Born: 11 July 1996 (age 30) Nieuwegein, Netherlands
- Height: 1.78 m (5 ft 10 in)

Sport
- Country: Netherlands
- Sport: Badminton
- Handedness: Right

Men's & mixed doubles
- Highest ranking: 28 (MD with Ties van der Lecq, 3 January 2023); 55 (XD with Iris Tabeling, 6 April 2017)
- BWF profile
Medal record
Men's badminton
Representing Netherlands
European Championships
Bronze medal – third place	2022 Madrid	Men's doubles
European Mixed Team Championships
Bronze medal – third place	2019 Copenhagen	Mixed team
European Men's Team Championships
Silver medal – second place	2020 Liévin	Men's team

Ruben Jille (born 11 July 1996) is a Dutch badminton player, specializing in doubles play. Jille started playing badminton at a small local club in Houten, the place where he grew up. He chose to join the national team in 2014. In 2016, he was semi-finalist at the Dutch Open partnered with Jacco Arends in the men's doubles event. In 2017, this partnership won its first international title at the Spanish International. His sister Debora Jille is also a member of the Dutch National badminton squad.

== Achievements ==
=== European Championships ===
Men's doubles
Year	Venue	Partner	Opponent	Score	Result
2022	Polideportivo Municipal Gallur; Madrid, Spain	(Netherlands) Ties van der Lecq	(Scotland) Alexander Dunn (Scotland) Adam Hall	10–21, 20–22	Bronze

=== BWF World Tour (1 title) ===
The BWF World Tour, which was announced on 19 March 2017 and implemented in 2018, is a series of elite badminton tournaments sanctioned by the Badminton World Federation (BWF). The BWF World Tour is divided into levels of World Tour Finals, Super 1000, Super 750, Super 500, Super 300, and the BWF Tour Super 100.

Men's doubles
Year	Tournament	Level	Partner	Opponent	Score	Result
2022	Orléans Masters	Super 100	(Netherlands) Ties van der Lecq	(Malaysia) Junaidi Arif (Malaysia) Muhammad Haikal	Walkover	(gold) Winner

=== BWF Grand Prix (1 runner-up) ===
The BWF Grand Prix had two levels, the Grand Prix and Grand Prix Gold. It was a series of badminton tournaments sanctioned by the Badminton World Federation (BWF) and played between 2007 and 2017.

Men's doubles
Year	Tournament	Partner	Opponent	Score	Result
2017	Scottish Open	(Netherlands) Jacco Arends	(Netherlands) Jelle Maas (Netherlands) Robin Tabeling	11–21, 15–21	(silver) Runner-up

BWF Grand Prix Gold tournament
BWF Grand Prix tournament

=== BWF International Challenge/Series (2 titles, 2 runners-up) ===
Men's doubles
Year	Tournament	Partner	Opponent	Score	Result
2017	Spanish International	(Netherlands) Jacco Arends	(Japan) Keiichiro Matsui (Japan) Yoshinori Takeuchi	21–17, 21–19	(gold) Winner
2018	Belgian International	(Netherlands) Jacco Arends	(Denmark) David Daugaard (Denmark) Frederik Søgaard	11–21, 21–18, 21–17	(gold) Winner
2020	Austrian Open	(Netherlands) Ties van der Lecq	(Scotland) Alexander Duun (Scotland) Adam Hall	18–21, 11–21	(silver) Runner-up

Mixed doubles
Year	Tournament	Partner	Opponent	Score	Result
2019	Polish International	(Netherlands) Alyssa Tirtosentono	(Denmark) Mikkel Mikkelsen (Denmark) Amalie Magelund	19–21, 17–21	(silver) Runner-up

BWF International Challenge tournament
BWF International Series tournament
BWF Future Series tournament
