= Mikkel Mikkelsen (badminton) =

Danish badminton player (born 1992)

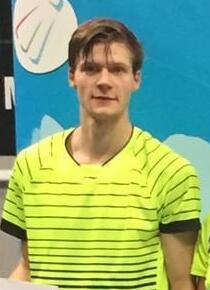
- Mikkelsen at the 2017 Finnish Open

Personal information
- Born: 22 May 1992 (age 34) Copenhagen, Denmark
- Height: 1.90 m (6 ft 3 in)

Sport
- Country: Denmark
- Sport: Badminton

Men'singles & doubles
- Highest ranking: 141 (MS 27 March 2014); 84 (MD with Jeppe Bay 26 November 2019); 27 (XD with Rikke Søby Hansen 25 October 2022)
- Current ranking: 28 (XD with Rikke Søby Hansen 24 January 2023)
- BWF profile
Medal record
Men's badminton
Representing Denmark
European Championships
Bronze medal – third place	2022 Madrid	Mixed doubles
European Mixed Team Championships
Gold medal – first place	2023 Aire-sur-la-Lys	Mixed team
European Junior Championships
Bronze medal – third place	2011 Vantaa	Mixed team

Mikkel Mikkelsen (born 22 May 1992) is a Danish badminton player. In 2016, he won the mixed doubles titles at the Portugal International tournament partnered with Mai Surrow. In May 2016, he and Surrow lifted their second title as a pair in only their fourth tournament together at the Slovenia International tournament.

== Achievements ==
=== European Championships ===
Mixed doubles
Year	Venue	Partner	Opponent	Score	Result
2022	Polideportivo Municipal Gallur; Madrid, Spain	(Denmark) Rikke Søby Hansen	(Germany) Mark Lamsfuß (Germany) Isabel Lohau	21–12, 16–21, 17–21	Bronze

=== BWF Grand Prix (1 runner-up) ===
The BWF Grand Prix had two levels, the Grand Prix and Grand Prix Gold. It was a series of badminton tournaments sanctioned by the Badminton World Federation (BWF) and played between 2007 and 2017.

Mixed doubles
Year	Tournament	Partner	Opponent	Score	Result
2017	Scottish Open	(Denmark) Mai Surrow	(Netherlands) Jacco Arends (Netherlands) Selena Piek	10–21, 10–21	(silver) Runner-up

BWF Grand Prix Gold tournament
BWF Grand Prix tournament

=== BWF International Challenge/Series (9 titles, 11 runners-up) ===
Men's doubles
Year	Tournament	Partner	Opponent	Score	Result
2010	Iceland International	(Denmark) Emil Holst	(Denmark) Frederik Colberg (Denmark) Kasper Paulsen	21–15, 21–17	(gold) Winner
2011	Turkiye Open	(Denmark) Nikolaj Overgaard	(England) Ben Stawski (Scotland) Paul van Rietvelde	19–21, 13–21	(silver) Runner-up
2013	Hungarian International	(Denmark) Frederik Colberg	(Indonesia) Albert Saputra (Indonesia) Indra Viki Okvana	16–21, 21–23	(silver) Runner-up
2014	Hellas International	(Denmark) Frederik Colberg	(Denmark) Mathias Christiansen (Denmark) David Daugaard	0–0 Retired	(silver) Runner-up
2019	Polish International	(Denmark) Jeppe Bay	(England) Zach Russ (England) Steven Stallwood	20–22, 19–21	(silver) Runner-up
2019	Scottish Open	(Denmark) Jeppe Bay	(Scotland) Alexander Dunn (Scotland) Adam Hall	10–21, 17–21	(silver) Runner-up

Mixed doubles
Year	Tournament	Partner	Opponent	Score	Result
2016	Portugal International	(Denmark) Mai Surrow	(Vietnam) Đỗ Tuấn Đức (Vietnam) Phạm Như Thảo	21–19, 17–21, 21–19	(gold) Winner
2016	Slovenia International	(Denmark) Mai Surrow	(Denmark) Steve Olesen (Denmark) Sara Lundgaard	21–9, 21–14	(gold) Winner
2016	Polish International	(Denmark) Mai Surrow	(Poland) Paweł Pietryja (Poland) Aneta Wojtkowska	21–19, 21–12	(gold) Winner
2017	Swedish International	(Denmark) Mai Surrow	(Denmark) Mathias Bay-Smidt (Denmark) Alexandra Bøje	21–18, 21–14	(gold) Winner
2017	Austrian Open	(Denmark) Mai Surrow	(China) Gao Xiangcheng (China) Xia Chunyu	21–19, 17–21, 21–14	(gold) Winner
2017	Finnish Open	(Denmark) Mai Surrow	(Chinese Taipei) Tseng Min-hao (Chinese Taipei) Hu Ling-fang	22–24, 16–21	(silver) Runner-up
2017	Slovenia International	(Denmark) Mai Surrow	(England) Gregory Mairs (England) Jenny Moore	21–12, 21–13	(gold) Winner
2018	Spanish International	(Denmark) Mai Surrow	(Russia) Evgenij Dremin (Russia) Evgenia Dimova	22–24, 12–21	(silver) Runner-up
2019	Swedish Open	(Denmark) Mai Surrow	(Singapore) Danny Bawa Chrisnanta (Singapore) Tan Wei Han	14–21, 16–21	(silver) Runner-up
2019	Belgian International	(Denmark) Amalie Magelund	(England) Ben Lane (England) Jessica Pugh	12–21, 15–21	(silver) Runner-up
2019	Polish International	(Denmark) Amalie Magelund	(Netherlands) Ruben Jille (Netherlands) Alyssa Tirtosentono	21–19, 21–17	(gold) Winner
2021	Dutch Open	(Denmark) Rikke Søby Hansen	(Netherlands) Robin Tabeling (Netherlands) Selena Piek	21–18, 13–21, 21–15	(gold) Winner
2021	Irish Open	(Denmark) Rikke Søby Hansen	(Netherlands) Robin Tabeling (Netherlands) Selena Piek	18–21, 15–21	(silver) Runner-up
2023	Belgian International	(Denmark) Rikke Søby Hansen	(England) Marcus Ellis (England) Lauren Smith	18–21, 15–21	(silver) Runner-up

BWF International Challenge tournament
BWF International Series tournament
BWF Future Series tournament
