= Alexander Dunn (badminton) =

Scottish badminton player (born 1998)

Personal information
- Born: 13 September 1998 (age 28) Bellshill, Scotland
- Years active: 2014
- Height: 1.8 m (5 ft 11 in)
- Weight: 77 kg (170 lb)

Sport
- Country: Scotland
- Sport: Badminton
- Handedness: Right
- Coached by: Ingo Kindervater; Robert Blair; Andy Bowman; Keith Turnbull; Jamie Neill

Men's & mixed doubles
- Highest ranking: 22 (MD with Adam Hall, 24 January 2023); 21 (XD with Julie MacPherson, 28 October 2025)
- Current ranking: 64 (MD with Adam Pringle); 31 (XD with Julie MacPherson) (3 November 2026)
- BWF profile
Medal record
Men's badminton
Representing Great Britain
European Games
Bronze medal – third place	2023 Kraków–Małopolska	Men's doubles
Representing Scotland
European Championships
Silver medal – second place	2022 Madrid	Men's doubles
European Junior Championships
Silver medal – second place	2017 Mulhouse	Mixed doubles
Bronze medal – third place	2015 Lubin	Boys' doubles

Alexander Dunn (born 13 September 1998) is a Scottish badminton player. Born in Bellshill, Dunn started playing badminton at aged seven, and joined the national team in 2009. He won a bronze medal at the 2015 European Junior Championships in the boys' doubles event with his partner Adam Hall, also the silver medal in the mixed doubles event with Eleanor O'Donnell in 2017. He competed at the 2018 and 2022 Commonwealth Games.

== Personal life ==
Dunn educated sport and physical activity at the University of Strathclyde, in Glasgow. At the age of 13, he was diagnosed with diabetes mellitus type 1.

== Achievements ==
=== European Games ===
Men's doubles
Year	Venue	Partner	Opponent	Score	Result
2023	Arena Jaskółka; Tarnów, Poland	(United Kingdom) Adam Hall	(Denmark) Kim Astrup (Denmark) Anders Skaarup Rasmussen	13–21, 21–16, 10–21	Bronze

=== European Championships ===
Men's doubles
Year	Venue	Partner	Opponent	Score	Result
2022	Polideportivo Municipal Gallur; Madrid, Spain	(Scotland) Adam Hall	(Germany) Mark Lamsfuß (Germany) Marvin Seidel	17–21, 16–21	Silver

=== European Junior Championships ===
Boys' doubles
Year	Venue	Partner	Opponent	Score	Result
2015	Regional Sport Centrum Hall; Lubin, Poland	(Scotland) Adam Hall	(Denmark) Alexander Bond (Denmark) Joel Eipe	17–21, 21–18, 15–21	Bronze

Mixed doubles
Year	Venue	Partner	Opponent	Score	Result
2017	Centre Sportif Régional d'Alsace; Mulhouse, France	(Scotland) Eleanor O'Donnell	(Russia) Rodion Alimov (Russia) Alina Davletova	16–21, 14–21	Silver

=== BWF World Tour (1 runner-up) ===
The BWF World Tour, which was announced on 19 March 2017 and implemented in 2018, is a series of elite badminton tournaments sanctioned by the Badminton World Federation (BWF). The BWF World Tours are divided into levels of World Tour Finals, Super 1000, Super 750, Super 500, Super 300, and the BWF Tour Super 100.

Mixed doubles
Year	Tournament	Level	Partner	Opponent	Score	Result
2024	Hylo Open	Super 300	(Scotland) Julie MacPherson	(Denmark) Jesper Toft (Denmark) Amalie Magelund	19–21, 16–21	(silver) Runner-up

=== BWF International Challenge/Series (7 titles, 3 runner-up) ===
Men's doubles
Year	Tournament	Partner	Opponent	Score	Result
2017	Polish Open	(Scotland) Adam Hall	(Poland) Łukasz Moreń (Poland) Wojciech Szkudlarczyk	11–21, 18–21	(silver) Runner-up
2017	Irish Open	(Scotland) Adam Hall	(Republic of Ireland) Joshua Magee (Republic of Ireland) Sam Magee	21–15, 6–21, 21–10	(gold) Winner
2017	Turkey International	(Scotland) Adam Hall	(Denmark) Mikkel Stoffersen (Denmark) Mathias Thyrri	21–14, 21–9	(gold) Winner
2018	Iceland International	(Scotland) Adam Hall	(Denmark) Nicklas Mathiasen (Denmark) Mikkel Stoffersen	21–16, 21–18	(gold) Winner
2019	Irish Open	(Scotland) Adam Hall	(Germany) Jones Ralfy Jansen (Germany) Peter Käsbauer	19–21, 21–17, 18–21	(silver) Runner-up
2019	Scottish Open	(Scotland) Adam Hall	(Denmark) Jeppe Bay (Denmark) Mikkel Mikkelsen	21–10, 21–17	(gold) Winner
2020	Austrian Open	(Scotland) Adam Hall	(Netherlands) Ruben Jille (Netherlands) Ties van der Lecq	21–18, 21–11	(gold) Winner
2025	Belgian International	(Scotland) Adam Pringle	(Denmark) Kristoffer Kolding (Denmark) Calvin Lundsgaard	18–21, 18–21	(silver) Runner-up

Mixed doubles
Year	Tournament	Partner	Opponent	Score	Result
2019	Welsh International	(Scotland) Ciara Torrance	(England) Matthew Clare (England) Hope Warner	21–14, 20–22, 21–17	(gold) Winner
2024	Scottish Open	(Scotland) Julie MacPherson	(Spain) Rubén García (Spain) Lucía Rodríguez	23–21, 21–16	(gold) Winner

BWF International Challenge tournament
BWF International Series tournament
BWF Future Series tournament
