= Jeppe Bay =

Danish badminton player (born 1997)

Personal information
- Born: Jeppe Bay Madsen; 4 March 1997 (age 29) Helsingør, Denmark
- Height: 1.78 m (5 ft 10 in)

Sport
- Country: Denmark
- Sport: Badminton
- Handedness: Right

Men's & mixed doubles
- Highest ranking: 23 (MD with Lasse Mølhede 11 October 2022); 37 (XD with Sara Lundgaard 27 September 2022)
- Current ranking: 44 (MD with Lasse Mølhede 2 January 2024)
- BWF profile
Medal record
Men's badminton
Representing Denmark
Thomas Cup
Bronze medal – third place	2022 Bangkok	Men's team
European Mixed Team Championships
Gold medal – first place	2023 Aire-sur-la-Lys	Mixed team

Jeppe Bay Madsen (born 4 March 1997) is a Danish badminton player. Bay started playing badminton in Helsingør in 2003 and entered the junior national team in 2007. He won his first BWF Tour title at the 2020 SaarLorLux Open in the men's doubles event with Lasse Mølhede.

== Achievements ==
=== BWF World Tour (1 title) ===
The BWF World Tour, which was announced on 19 March 2017 and implemented in 2018, is a series of elite badminton tournaments sanctioned by the Badminton World Federation (BWF). The BWF World Tour is divided into levels of World Tour Finals, Super 1000, Super 750, Super 500, Super 300 (part of the HSBC World Tour), and the BWF Tour Super 100.

Men's doubles
Year	Tournament	Level	Partner	Opponent	Score	Result
2020	SaarLorLux Open	Super 100	(Denmark) Lasse Mølhede	(Denmark) Daniel Lundgaard (Denmark) Mathias Thyrri	21–13, 21–15	(gold) Winner

=== BWF International Challenge/Series ===
Men's doubles
Year	Tournament	Partner	Opponent	Score	Result
2016	Finnish International	(Denmark) Rasmus Kjær	(Poland) Łukasz Moreń (Poland) Wojciech Szkudlarczyk	11–8, 11–2, 11–4	(gold) Winner
2017	Slovenian International	(Denmark) Rasmus Kjær	(Belgium) Matijs Dierickx (Belgium) Freek Golinski	13–21, 16–21	(silver) Runner-up
2017	Bulgarian Open	(Denmark) Rasmus Kjær	(Denmark) Mathias Thyrri (Denmark) Søren Toft Hansen	16–21, 12–21	(silver) Runner-up
2018	Slovenian International	(Denmark) Rasmus Kjær	(Denmark) Mads Emil Christensen (Denmark) Kristoffer Knudsen	21–14, 21–19	(gold) Winner
2019	Polish International	(Denmark) Mikkel Mikkelsen	(England) Zach Russ (England) Steven Stallwood	20–22, 19–21	(silver) Runner-up
2019	Scottish Open	(Denmark) Mikkel Mikkelsen	(Scotland) Alexander Dunn (Scotland) Adam Hall	10–21, 17–21	(silver) Runner-up

Mixed doubles
Year	Tournament	Partner	Opponent	Score	Result
2018	Czech Open	(Denmark) Ditte Søby	(France) Ronan Labar (France) Audrey Fontaine	10–21, 21–12, 13–21	(silver) Runner-up
2020	Austrian Open	(Denmark) Sara Lundgaard	(Finland) Anton Kaisti (Czech Republic) Alžběta Bášová	21–16, 21–13	(gold) Winner
2021	Denmark Masters	(Denmark) Sara Lundgaard	(Denmark) Niclas Nøhr (Denmark) Amalie Magelund	21–15, 21–14	(gold) Winner

BWF International Challenge tournament
BWF International Series tournament
BWF Future Series tournament
