= Amalie Magelund =

Danish badminton player (born 2000)

Personal information
- Born: Amalie Magelund Krogh; 13 May 2000 (age 26) Roskilde, Denmark
- Years active: 2015–present
- Height: 1.66 m (5 ft 5 in)

Sport
- Country: Denmark
- Sport: Badminton
- Handedness: Right

Women's & mixed doubles
- Highest ranking: 22 (WD with Freja Ravn, 27 September 2022); 7 (XD with Jesper Toft, 15 April 2025); 20 (XD with Mathias Thyrri, 19 March 2024); 23 (XD with Niclas Nøhr, 8 November 2022)
- Current ranking: 19 (XD with Jesper Toft, 4 August 2026)
- BWF profile
Medal record
Women's badminton
Representing Denmark
European Championships
Gold medal – first place	2025 Horsens	Mixed doubles
Bronze medal – third place	2022 Madrid	Women's doubles
Bronze medal – third place	2024 Saarbrücken	Mixed doubles
Bronze medal – third place	2026 Huelva	Mixed doubles
European Mixed Team Championships
Gold medal – first place	2021 Vantaa	Mixed team
Gold medal – first place	2023 Aire-sur-la-Lys	Mixed team
Gold medal – first place	2025 Baku	Mixed team
European Women's Team Championships
Gold medal – first place	2020 Liévin	Women's team
Gold medal – first place	2024 Łódź	Women's team
Silver medal – second place	2026 Istanbul	Women's team
European Junior Championships
Silver medal – second place	2018 Tallinn	Girls' doubles
Silver medal – second place	2018 Tallinn	Mixed team
Bronze medal – third place	2017 Mulhouse	Girls' doubles
Bronze medal – third place	2017 Mulhouse	Mixed team

Amalie Magelund Krogh (born 13 May 2000) is a Danish badminton player, specializing in doubles play. She won the gold medal in the mixed doubles at the 2025 European Championships. As a junior player, she was a silver medalist at the 2018 European Junior Championships in both the team and girls' doubles events. She announced her pregnancy while competing in the 2026 European Championships and welcomed her firstborn in September 2026.

== Achievements ==
=== European Championships ===
Women's doubles
Year	Venue	Partner	Opponent	Score	Result
2022	Polideportivo Municipal Gallur, Madrid, Spain	(Denmark) Freja Ravn	(Bulgaria) Gabriela Stoeva (Bulgaria) Stefani Stoeva	11–21, 12–21	Bronze

Mixed doubles
Year	Venue	Partner	Opponent	Score	Result
2024	Saarlandhalle, Saarbrücken, Germany	(Denmark) Mathias Thyrri	(France) Thom Gicquel (France) Delphine Delrue	20–22, 21–16, 13–21	Bronze
2025	Forum, Horsens, Denmark	(Denmark) Jesper Toft	(France) Thom Gicquel (France) Delphine Delrue	21–18, 21–19	Gold
2026	Palacio de los Deportes Carolina Marín, Huelva, Spain	(Denmark) Jesper Toft	(England) Callum Hemming (England) Estelle van Leeuwen	21–23, 16–21	Bronze

=== European Junior Championships ===
Girls' doubles
Year	Venue	Partner	Opponent	Score	Result
2017	Centre Sportif Regional d'Alsace; Mulhouse, France	(Denmark) Freja Ravn	(Sweden) Emma Karlsson (Sweden) Johanna Magnusson	12–21, 17–21	Bronze
2018	Kalev Sports Hall; Tallinn, Estonia	(Denmark) Freja Ravn	(Turkey) Bengisu Erçetin (Turkey) Nazlıcan İnci	21–14, 17–21, 17–21	Silver

=== BWF World Tour (3 titles, 7 runners-up) ===
The BWF World Tour, which was announced on 19 March 2017 and implemented in 2018, is a series of elite badminton tournaments sanctioned by the Badminton World Federation (BWF). The BWF World Tour is divided into levels of World Tour Finals, Super 1000, Super 750, Super 500, Super 300, and the BWF Tour Super 100.

Women's doubles
Year	Tournament	Level	Partner	Opponent	Score	Result
2020	SaarLorLux Open	Super 100	(Denmark) Freja Ravn	(Bulgaria) Gabriela Stoeva (Bulgaria) Stefani Stoeva	8–21, 11–21	(silver) Runner-up
2021	Spain Masters	Super 300	(Denmark) Freja Ravn	(Indonesia) Yulfira Barkah (Indonesia) Febby Valencia Dwijayanti Gani	16–21, 14–21	(silver) Runner-up

Mixed doubles
Year	Tournament	Level	Partner	Opponent	Score	Result
2021	Orléans Masters	Super 100	(Denmark) Niclas Nøhr	(Denmark) Mathias Christiansen (Denmark) Alexandra Bøje	13–21, 17–21	(silver) Runner-up
2021	Spain Masters	Super 300	(Denmark) Niclas Nøhr	(Indonesia) Rinov Rivaldy (Indonesia) Pitha Haningtyas Mentari	18–21, 15–21	(silver) Runner-up
2023	Canada Open	Super 500	(Denmark) Mathias Thyrri	(Japan) Hiroki Midorikawa (Japan) Natsu Saito	17–21, 21–16, 13–21	(silver) Runner-up
2023	U.S. Open	Super 300	(Denmark) Mathias Thyrri	(Chinese Taipei) Ye Hong-wei (Chinese Taipei) Lee Chia-hsin	21–13, 6–21, 18–21	(silver) Runner-up
2024	U.S. Open	Super 300	(Denmark) Jesper Toft	(Thailand) Pakkapon Teeraratsakul (Thailand) Phataimas Muenwong	21–15, 19–21, 13–21	(silver) Runner-up
2024	Canada Open	Super 500	(Denmark) Jesper Toft	(Denmark) Mathias Christiansen (Denmark) Alexandra Bøje	9–21, 24–22, 21–12	(gold) Winner
2024	Hylo Open	Super 300	(Denmark) Jesper Toft	(Scotland) Alexander Dunn (Scotland) Julie MacPherson	21–19, 21–16	(gold) Winner
2025	Orléans Masters	Super 300	(Denmark) Jesper Toft	(Indonesia) Rehan Naufal Kusharjanto (Indonesia) Gloria Emanuelle Widjaja	21–17, 21–13	(gold) Winner

=== BWF International Challenge/Series (9 titles, 4 runners-up) ===
Women's doubles
Year	Tournament	Partner	Opponent	Score	Result
2018	Dutch International	(Denmark) Freja Ravn	(Chinese Taipei) Chang Ya-lan (Chinese Taipei) Cheng Wen-hsing	18–21, 25–27	(silver) Runner-up
2018	Bulgaria International	(Denmark) Freja Ravn	(Bulgaria) Gabriela Stoeva (Bulgaria) Stefani Stoeva	16–21, 19–21	(silver) Runner-up
2019	Swedish Open	(Denmark) Freja Ravn	(Sweden) Emma Karlsson (Sweden) Johanna Magnusson	21–15, 12–21, 21–17	(gold) Winner
2019	Dutch International	(Denmark) Freja Ravn	(Netherlands) Debora Jille (Netherlands) Alyssa Tirtosentono	22–24, 21–19, 21–11	(gold) Winner
2019	Polish International	(Denmark) Freja Ravn	(Sweden) Emma Karlsson (Sweden) Johanna Magnusson	15–21, 21–15, 21–15	(gold) Winner
2019	Irish Open	(Denmark) Freja Ravn	(France) Delphine Delrue (France) Léa Palermo	21–18, 21–11	(gold) Winner
2019	Scottish Open	(Denmark) Freja Ravn	(Denmark) Julie Finne-Ipsen (Denmark) Mai Surrow	17–21, 21–15, 21–6	(gold) Winner
2021	Denmark Masters	(Denmark) Freja Ravn	(India) Ashwini Ponnappa (India) N. Sikki Reddy	15–21, 21–19, 21–14	(gold) Winner

Mixed doubles
Year	Tournament	Partner	Opponent	Score	Result
2019	Belgian International	(Denmark) Mikkel Mikkelsen	(England) Ben Lane (England) Jessica Pugh	12–21, 15–21	(silver) Runner-up
2019	Polish International	(Denmark) Mikkel Mikkelsen	(Netherlands) Ruben Jille (Netherlands) Alyssa Tirtosentono	21–19, 21–17	(gold) Winner
2021	Denmark Masters	(Denmark) Niclas Nøhr	(Denmark) Jeppe Bay (Denmark) Sara Lundgaard	15–21, 14–21	(silver) Runner-up
2022	Canadian International	(Denmark) Mathias Thyrri	(Germany) Jan Colin Völker (Germany) Stine Küspert	21–17, 21–16	(gold) Winner
2024	Nantes International	(Denmark) Jesper Toft	(England) Callum Hemming (England) Estelle van Leeuwen	21–11, 21–13	(gold) Winner

BWF International Challenge tournament
BWF International Series tournament
BWF Future Series tournament
