= Adam Hall (badminton) =

Scottish badminton player (born 1996)

Personal information
- Born: Adam Alistair Murdoch Mcg Hall; 12 February 1996 (age 30) Irvine, Scotland
- Height: 1.87 m (6 ft 2 in)

Sport
- Country: Scotland
- Sport: Badminton
- Handedness: Right
- Coached by: Ingo Kindervater; Robert Blair; Andy Bowman

Men's & mixed doubles
- Highest ranking: 22 (MD with Alexander Dunn 24 January 2023); 21 (XD with Julie MacPherson 27 December 2022)
- Current ranking: 83 (MD with Alexander Dunn 4 March 2025)
- BWF profile
Medal record
Men's badminton
Representing Great Britain
European Games
Bronze medal – third place	2023 Kraków–Małopolska	Men's doubles
Representing Scotland
European Championships
Silver medal – second place	2022 Madrid	Men's doubles
European Junior Championships
Bronze medal – third place	2015 Lubin	Boys' doubles

Adam Alistair Murdoch McGregor Hall (born 12 February 1996) is a Scottish badminton player. He was the bronze medalist at the 2015 European Junior Championships in the boys' doubles event with his partner Alexander Dunn. He competed at the 2018 and 2022 Commonwealth Games.

Hall studied sport and fitness management at the Open University in Scotland.

== Achievements ==
=== European Games ===
Men's doubles
Year	Venue	Partner	Opponent	Score	Result
2023	Arena Jaskółka; Tarnów, Poland	(United Kingdom) Alexander Dunn	(Denmark) Kim Astrup (Denmark) Anders Skaarup Rasmussen	13–21, 21–16, 10–21	Bronze

=== European Championships ===
Men's doubles
Year	Venue	Partner	Opponent	Score	Result
2022	Polideportivo Municipal Gallur; Madrid, Spain	(Scotland) Alexander Dunn	(Germany) Mark Lamsfuß (Germany) Marvin Seidel	17–21, 16–21	Silver

=== European Junior Championships ===
Boys' doubles
Year	Venue	Partner	Opponent	Score	Result
2015	Regional Sport Centrum Hall; Lubin, Poland	(Scotland) Alexander Dunn	(Denmark) Alexander Bond (Denmark) Joel Eipe	17–21, 21–18, 15–21	Bronze

=== BWF Grand Prix (1 runner-up) ===
The BWF Grand Prix had two levels, the Grand Prix and Grand Prix Gold. It was a series of badminton tournaments sanctioned by the Badminton World Federation (BWF) and played between 2007 and 2017.

Men's doubles
Year	Tournament	Partner	Opponent	Score	Result
2016	Scottish Open	(England) Peter Mills	(Denmark) Mathias Christiansen (Denmark) David Daugaard	21–15, 19–21, 15–21	(silver) Runner-up

BWF Grand Prix Gold tournament
BWF Grand Prix tournament

=== BWF International Challenge/Series (6 titles, 4 runners-up) ===
Men's doubles
Year	Tournament	Partner	Opponent	Score	Result
2014	Welsh International	(Scotland) Gordon Thomson	(England) Matthew Nottingham (England) Harley Towler	15–21, 13–21	(silver) Runner-up
2016	Iceland International	(England) Chris Coles	(England) Ben Lane (England) Sean Vendy	21–19, 21–19	(gold) Winner
2017	Polish Open	(Scotland) Alexander Duun	(Poland) Łukasz Moreń (Poland) Wojciech Szkudlarczyk	11–21, 18–21	(silver) Runner-up
2017	Irish Open	(Scotland) Alexander Dunn	(Republic of Ireland) Joshua Magee (Republic of Ireland) Sam Magee	21–15, 6–21, 21–10	(gold) Winner
2017	Turkey International	(Scotland) Alexander Dunn	(Denmark) Mikkel Stoffersen (Denmark) Mathias Thyrri	21–14, 21–9	(gold) Winner
2018	Iceland International	(Scotland) Alexander Dunn	(Denmark) Nicklas Mathiasen (Denmark) Mikkel Stoffersen	21–16, 21–18	(gold) Winner
2019	Irish Open	(Scotland) Alexander Dunn	(Germany) Jones Ralfy Jansen (Germany) Peter Käsbauer	19–21, 21–17, 18–21	(silver) Runner-up
2019	Scottish Open	(Scotland) Alexander Dunn	(Denmark) Jeppe Bay (Denmark) Mikkel Mikkelsen	21–10, 21–17	(gold) Winner
2020	Austrian Open	(Scotland) Alexander Dunn	(Netherlands) Ruben Jille (Netherlands) Ties van der Lecq	21–18, 21–11	(gold) Winner

Mixed doubles
Year	Tournament	Partner	Opponent	Score	Result
2018	Belgian International	(Scotland) Julie MacPherson	(Netherlands) Jacco Arends (Netherlands) Selena Piek	11–21, 13–21	(silver) Runner-up

BWF International Challenge tournament
BWF International Series tournament
BWF Future Series tournament
