= Jessica Pugh =

English badminton player

Personal information
- Born: Jessica Rose Pugh; 17 March 1997 (age 29) Telford, Shropshire, England
- Height: 1.65 m (5 ft 5 in)
- Weight: 55 kg (121 lb)

Sport
- Country: England
- Sport: Badminton
- Handedness: Right
- Coached by: Nathan Robertson; Julian Robertson
- Retired: 4 April 2023

Women's & mixed doubles
- Highest ranking: 26 (WD with Chloe Birch 21 June 2018); 21 (XD with Ben Lane 28 June 2018)
- BWF profile
Medal record
Women's badminton
Representing England
Commonwealth Games
Bronze medal – third place	2018 Gold Coast	Mixed team
European Junior Championships
Silver medal – second place	2015 Lubin	Mixed team
Bronze medal – third place	2015 Lubin	Mixed doubles

Jessica Rose Pugh (born 17 March 1997) is an English badminton player. She joined the national junior team in 2008, and selected to the senior team in 2015. She had won the mixed doubles bronze medal at the 2015 European Junior Championships in Poland, also helped the team winning the silver medal. She won her first senior international tournament when she was 16 years old in Hungarian International. Pugh was part of the English team that won the mixed team bronze at the 2018 Commonwealth Games in Gold Coast, Australia. Pugh announced her retirement from international competition on 4 April 2023.

== Achievements ==
=== European Junior Championships ===
Mixed doubles
Year	Venue	Partner	Opponent	Score	Result
2015	Regional Sport Centrum Hall; Lubin, Poland	(England) Ben Lane	(Denmark) Frederik Søgaard (Denmark) Sara Lundgaard	16–21, 21–23	Bronze

=== BWF International Challenge/Series (11 titles, 6 runners-up) ===
Women's doubles
Year	Tournament	Partner	Opponent	Score	Result
2015	Polish International	(England) Chloe Birch	(Sweden) Clara Nistad (Sweden) Emma Wengberg	16–21, 21–6, 15–21	(silver) Runner-up
2016	Iceland International	(England) Sarah Walker	(England) Chloe Birch (England) Jenny Wallwork	21–10, 10–21, 21–17	(gold) Winner
2016	Romanian International	(Netherlands) Cheryl Seinen	(Malaysia) Goh Yea Ching (Malaysia) Peck Yen Wei	21–19, 21–15	(gold) Winner
2016	Slovenia International	(Netherlands) Cheryl Seinen	(England) Chloe Birch (England) Sarah Walker	20–22, 19–21	(silver) Runner-up

Mixed doubles
Year	Tournament	Partner	Opponent	Score	Result
2014	Hungarian International	(England) Ben Lane	(Czech Republic) Jakub Bitman (Czech Republic) Alžběta Bášová	11–4, 11–10, 11–7	(gold) Winner
2015	Slovak Open	(England) Ben Lane	(Vietnam) Đỗ Tuấn Đức (Vietnam) Phạm Như Thảo	18–21, 21–13, 21–12	(gold) Winner
2016	Dutch International	(England) Ben Lane	(Denmark) Alexander Bond (Denmark) Ditte Søby Hansen	21–19, 21–23, 18–21	(silver) Runner-up
2016	Spanish International	(England) Ben Lane	(France) Gaëtan Mittelheisser (France) Émilie Lefel	21–14, 15–21, 21–14	(gold) Winner
2017	Italian International	(England) Ben Lane	(England) Marcus Ellis (England) Lauren Smith	16–21, 21–19, 21–4	(gold) Winner
2019	Polish Open	(England) Ben Lane	(France) Thom Gicquel (France) Delphine Delrue	21–17, 21–15	(gold) Winner
2019	Spanish International	(England) Ben Lane	(Denmark) Mathias Bay-Smidt (Denmark) Rikke Søby Hansen	21–13, 24–26, 21–18	(gold) Winner
2019	Belgian International	(England) Ben Lane	(Denmark) Mikkel Mikkelsen (Denmark) Amalie Magelund	21–12, 21–15	(gold) Winner
2021	Portugal International	(England) Callum Hemming	(France) William Villeger (France) Sharone Bauer	21–18, 19–21, 21–15	(gold) Winner
2021	Spanish International	(England) Callum Hemming	(Malaysia) Tee Kai Wun (Malaysia) Teoh Mei Xing	15–21, 21–13, 19–21	(silver) Runner-up
2021	Scottish Open	(England) Callum Hemming	(India) Ishaan Bhatnagar (India) Tanisha Crasto	21-15, 21–17	(gold) Winner
2021	Welsh International	(England) Callum Hemming	(France) William Villeger (France) Anne Tran	15–21, 21–17, 16–21	(silver) Runner-up
2022	Dutch Open	(England) Callum Hemming	(Netherlands) Robin Tabeling (Netherlands) Selena Piek	17–21, 12–21	(silver) Runner-up

BWF International Challenge tournament
BWF International Series tournament
BWF Future Series tournament
