= 2017 in badminton =

== International badminton events ==
- May 21 – 28: 2017 Sudirman Cup in (Australia) Gold Coast, Queensland
  - South Korea defeated China, 3–2 in matches played, to win their fourth Sudirman Cup title.
- August 21 – 27: 2017 BWF World Championships in (Scotland) Glasgow
  - Singles: (Denmark) Viktor Axelsen (m) / (Japan) Nozomi Okuhara (f)
  - Doubles: China (Liu Cheng & Zhang Nan) (m) / China (Chen Qingchen & Jia Yifan) (f)
  - Mixed: Indonesia (Tontowi Ahmad & Liliyana Natsir)
- September 10 – 17: 2017 BWF World Senior Championships in (India) Kochi
  - For results, click here.
- October 9 – 22: 2017 BWF World Junior Championships in Yogyakarta
  - Singles: (Thailand) Kunlavut Vitidsarn (m) / (Indonesia) Gregoria Mariska Tunjung (f)
  - Doubles: Japan (Mahiro Kaneko & Yunosuke Kubota) (m) / South Korea (Baek Ha-na & Lee Yu-rim) (f)
  - Mixed: Indonesia (Rinov Rivaldy & Pitha Haningtyas Mentari)

== Continental badminton events ==
- February 13 – 15: 2017 Oceania Senior and Junior Badminton Championships in (France) / (New Caledonia) Nouméa
  - Senior
  - Singles winners: (Australia) Pit Seng Low (m) / (Australia) Wendy Chen Hsuan-yu (f)
  - Doubles winners: (Australia) Matthew Chau & Sawan Serasinghe (m) / (Australia) Setyana Mapasa & Gronya Somerville (f)
  - Mixed winners: (Australia) Sawan Serasinghe & Setyana Mapasa
  - Junior
  - Junior Singles winners: (New Zealand) Oscar Guo (m) / (New Zealand) Sally Fu (f)
  - Junior Doubles winners: (New Zealand) Oscar Guo & Dacmen Vong (m) / (New Zealand) Sally Fu & Tamara Otene (f)
  - Mixed Junior winners: (New Zealand) Edward Lau & Christine Zhang
- February 14 – 19: 2017 Badminton Asia Mixed Team Championships in (Vietnam) Ho Chi Minh City
  - Champions: Japan; Second: South Korea; 3/4 Placements: Thailand & China
- February 15 – 19: 2017 European Mixed Team Badminton Championships in (Poland) Lubin
  - Champions: Denmark; Second: Russia; 3/4 Placements: England & Germany
- February 16 – 18: 2017 Oceania Junior Mixed Team Badminton Championships in (France) / (New Caledonia) Nouméa
  - Champions: New Zealand; Second: Australia; Third: Tahiti
- February 16 – 19: 2017 Pan Am Mixed Team Badminton Championships in Santo Domingo
  - Champions: Canada & the Dominican Republic; Second: Brazil & Mexico; Third: The United States
- April 7 – 16: 2017 European Junior and Junior Team Badminton Championships in Mulhouse
  - Junior Singles winners: (France) Toma Junior Popov (m) / (Denmark) Julie Dawall Jakobsen (f)
  - Junior Doubles winners: France (Thom Gicquel & Toma Junior Popov) (m) / Sweden (Emma Karlsson & Johanna Magnusson) (f)
  - Junior Mixed winners: Russia (Rodion Alimov & Alina Davletova)
  - Junior Team winners: France
- April 17 – 23: 2017 All Africa Mixed Team and Individual Badminton Championships in Benoni & Johannesburg
  - Singles winners: (Algeria) Adel Hamek (m) / (Mauritius) Kate Foo Kune (f)
  - Doubles winners: Algeria (Koceila Mammeri & Youcef Sabri Medel) (m) / South Africa (Michelle Butler-Emmett & Jennifer Fry) (f)
  - Mixed Doubles winners: South Africa (Andries Malan & Jennifer Fry)
  - Mixed Team winners: Egypt
- April 25 – 30: 2017 Badminton Asia Championships in Wuhan
  - Singles winners: (China) Chen Long (m) / (Chinese Taipei) Tai Tzu-ying (f)
  - Doubles winners: China (Li Junhui & Liu Yuchen) (m) / Japan (Misaki Matsutomo & Ayaka Takahashi) (f)
  - Mixed Doubles winners: China (Lu Kai & Huang Yaqiong)
- April 25 – 30: 2017 European Badminton Championships in Kolding
  - Singles winners: (England) Rajiv Ouseph (m) / (Spain) Carolina Marín (f)
  - Doubles winners: Denmark (Mathias Boe & Carsten Mogensen) (m) / Denmark (Kamilla Rytter Juhl & Christinna Pedersen) (f)
  - Mixed Doubles winners: England (Chris Adcock & Gabby Adcock)
- April 27 – 30: 2017 Pan Am Badminton Championships in (Cuba) Havana
  - Singles winners: (Brazil) Ygor Coelho de Oliveira (m) / (Canada) Rachel Honderich (f)
  - Doubles winners: Canada (Jason Ho-shue & Nyl Yakura) (m) / Canada (Michelle Tong & Josephine Wu) (f)
  - Mixed Doubles winners: Canada (Toby Ng & Rachel Honderich)
- July 22 – 30: 2017 Badminton Asia Team & Individual Junior Championships in Jakarta
  - Singles winners: (Malaysia) LEUNG Jun Hao (m) / (China) HAN Yue (f)
  - Doubles winners: China (DI Zijian & WANG Chang) (m) / South Korea (BAEK Ha-na & LEE Yu-rim) (f)
  - Mixed Doubles winners: Indonesia (Rehan Naufal Kusharjanto & Siti Fadia Silva Ramadhanti)
  - Team -> Champions: South Korea; Second: Indonesia; Third/Fourth: Malaysia & Japan
- July 25 – 28: 2017 Pan American Junior Badminton Championships in Markham, Ontario
  - Singles winners: (Canada) Brian Yang (m) / (United States) Lauren Lam (f)
  - Doubles winners: Brazil (Fabricio Farias & Waleson Vinicios Evangelista dos Santos) (m) / United States (Breanna Chi & Cindy Yuan) (f)
  - Mixed Doubles winners: Canada (Brian Yang & Katie Ho-Shue)

== 2017 BWF Super Series ==
- March 7 – December 17: 2017 BWF Super Series Schedule
  - March 7 – 12: 2017 All England Super Series Premier in Birmingham
    - Singles: (Malaysia) Lee Chong Wei (m) / (Chinese Taipei) Tai Tzu-ying (f)
    - Doubles: Indonesia (Marcus Fernaldi Gideon & Kevin Sanjaya Sukamuljo) (m) / South Korea (Chang Ye-na & Lee So-hee) (f)
    - Mixed: China (Lu Kai & Huang Yaqiong)
  - March 28 – April 2: 2017 India Super Series in New Delhi
    - Singles: (Denmark) Viktor Axelsen (m) / (India) P. V. Sindhu (f)
    - Doubles: Indonesia (Marcus Fernaldi Gideon & Kevin Sanjaya Sukamuljo) (m) / Japan (Shiho Tanaka & Koharu Yonemoto) (f)
    - Mixed: China (Lu Kai & Huang Yaqiong)
  - April 4 – 9: 2017 Malaysia Super Series Premier in Kuala Lumpur
    - Singles: (China) Lin Dan (m) / (Chinese Taipei) Tai Tzu-ying (f)
    - Doubles: Indonesia (Marcus Fernaldi Gideon & Kevin Sanjaya Sukamuljo) (m) / Japan (Yuki Fukushima & Sayaka Hirota) (f)
    - Mixed: China (Zheng Siwei & Chen Qingchen)
  - April 11 – 16: 2017 Singapore Super Series in Singapore
    - Singles: (India) B. Sai Praneeth (m) / (Chinese Taipei) Tai Tzu-ying (f)
    - Doubles: Denmark (Mathias Boe & Carsten Mogensen) (m) / Denmark (Kamilla Rytter Juhl & Christinna Pedersen) (f)
    - Mixed: China (Lu Kai & Huang Yaqiong)
  - June 13 – 18: 2017 Indonesia Super Series Premier in Jakarta
    - Singles: (India) Srikanth Kidambi (m) / (Japan) Sayaka Sato (f)
    - Doubles: China (Li Junhui & Liu Yuchen) (m) / China (Jia Yifan & Chen Qingchen) (f)
    - Mixed: Indonesia (Tontowi Ahmad & Liliyana Natsir)
  - June 20 – 25: 2017 Australian Super Series in (Australia) Sydney
    - Singles: (India) Srikanth Kidambi (m) / (Japan) Nozomi Okuhara (f)
    - Doubles: Japan (Takeshi Kamura & Keigo Sonoda) (m) / Japan (Misaki Matsutomo & Ayaka Takahashi) (f)
    - Mixed: China (Zheng Siwei & Chen Qingchen)
  - September 12 – 17: 2017 Korea Open Super Series in (South Korea) Seoul
    - Singles: (Indonesia) Anthony Sinisuka Ginting (m) / (India) P. V. Sindhu (f)
    - Doubles: Denmark (Mathias Boe & Carsten Mogensen) (m) / China (Huang Yaqiong & Yu Xiaohan) (f)
    - Mixed: Indonesia (Praveen Jordan & Debby Susanto)
  - September 19 – 24: 2017 Japan Open Superseries in Tokyo
    - Singles: (Denmark) Viktor Axelsen (m) / (Spain) Carolina Marín (f)
    - Doubles: Indonesia (Marcus Fernaldi Gideon & Kevin Sanjaya Sukamuljo) (m) / Japan (Misaki Matsutomo & Ayaka Takahashi) (f)
    - Mixed: China (Wang Yilu & Huang Dongping)
  - October 17 – 22: 2017 Denmark Super Series Premier in Odense
    - Singles: (India) Srikanth Kidambi (m) / (Thailand) Ratchanok Intanon (f)
    - Doubles: China (Liu Cheng & Zhang Nan) (m) / South Korea (Lee So-hee & Shin Seung-chan) (f)
    - Mixed: Hong Kong (Tang Chun Man & Tse Ying Suet)
  - October 24 – 29: 2017 French Open Superseries in (France) Paris
    - Singles: (India) Srikanth Kidambi (m) / (Chinese Taipei) Tai Tzu-ying (f)
    - Doubles: Chinese Taipei (Lee Jhe-huei & Lee Yang) (m) / Indonesia (Greysia Polii & Apriyani Rahayu) (f)
    - Mixed: Indonesia (Tontowi Ahmad & Liliyana Natsir)
  - November 14 – 19: 2017 China Open Superseries Premier in Fuzhou
    - Singles: (China) Chen Long (m) / (Japan) Akane Yamaguchi (f)
    - Doubles: Indonesia (Marcus Fernaldi Gideon & Kevin Sanjaya Sukamuljo) (m) / China (Chen Qingchen & Jia Yifan) (f)
    - Mixed: China (Zheng Siwei & Huang Yaqiong)
  - November 21 – 26: 2017 Hong Kong Open Superseries in Kowloon
    - Singles: (Malaysia) Lee Chong Wei (m) / (Chinese Taipei) Tai Tzu-ying (f)
    - Doubles: Indonesia (Marcus Fernaldi Gideon & Kevin Sanjaya Sukamuljo) (m) / China (Chen Qingchen & Jia Yifan) (f)
    - Mixed: China (Zheng Siwei & Huang Yaqiong)
  - December 13 – 17: 2017 BWF Super Series Finals in (United Arab Emirates) Dubai
    - Singles: (Denmark) Viktor Axelsen (m) / (Japan) Akane Yamaguchi (f)
    - Doubles: Indonesia Marcus Fernaldi Gideon & Kevin Sanjaya Sukamuljo) (m) / Japan (Shiho Tanaka & Koharu Yonemoto) (f)
    - Mixed: China (Zheng Siwei & Chen Qingchen)

== 2017 BWF Grand Prix Gold and Grand Prix ==
- January 17 – December 10: 2017 BWF Grand Prix Gold and Grand Prix Schedules
  - January 17 – 22: 2017 Malaysia Masters Grand Prix Gold in Kuala Lumpur
    - Singles: (Hong Kong) Angus Ng (m) / (India) Saina Nehwal (f)
    - Doubles: Indonesia (Berry Angriawan & Hardianto) (m) / Thailand (Jongkolphan Kititharakul & Rawinda Prajongjai) (f)
    - Mixed: Malaysia (Tan Kian Meng & Lai Pei Jing)
  - January 24 – 29: 2017 Syed Modi International Grand Prix Gold in Lucknow
    - Singles: (India) Sameer Verma (m) / (India) P. V. Sindhu (f)
    - Doubles: Denmark (Mathias Boe & Carsten Mogensen) (m) / Denmark (Kamilla Rytter Juhl & Christinna Pedersen) (f)
    - Mixed: India (Pranav Chopra & N. Sikki Reddy)
  - February 7 – 12: 2017 Thailand Masters Grand Prix Gold in Bangkok
    - Singles: (Indonesia) Tommy Sugiarto (m) / (Thailand) Busanan Ongbumrungpan (f)
    - Doubles: China (Huang Kaixiang & Wang Yilu) (m) / China (Chen Qingchen & Jia Yifan) (f)
    - Mixed: China (Zhang Nan & Li Yinhui)
  - February 28 – March 5: 2017 German Open Grand Prix Gold in (Germany) Mülheim
    - Singles: (Chinese Taipei) Chou Tien-chen (m) / (Japan) Akane Yamaguchi (f)
    - Doubles: Denmark (Kim Astrup & Anders Skaarup Rasmussen) (m) / Japan (Yuki Fukushima & Sayaka Hirota) (f)
    - Mixed: China (Zhang Nan & Li Yinhui)
  - March 14 – 19: 2017 Swiss Open Grand Prix Gold in (Switzerland) Basel
    - Singles: (China) Lin Dan (m) / (China) Chen Xiaoxin (f)
    - Doubles: China (Chai Biao & Hong Wei) (m) / China (Chen Qingchen & Jia Yifan) (f)
    - Mixed: Thailand (Dechapol Puavaranukroh & Sapsiree Taerattanachai)
  - April 18 – 23: 2017 China Masters Grand Prix Gold in Jiangsu
    - Singles: (China) Tian Houwei (m) / (Japan) Aya Ohori (f)
    - Doubles: Chinese Taipei (Chen Hung-ling & Wang Chi-lin) (m) / China (Bao Yixin & Yu Xiaohan) (f)
    - Mixed: China (Wang Yilu & Huang Dongping)
  - May 30 – June 4: 2017 Thailand Open Grand Prix Gold in Bangkok
    - Singles: (India) B. Sai Praneeth (m) / (Thailand) Ratchanok Intanon (f)
    - Doubles: Indonesia (Berry Angriawan & Hardianto) (m) / Indonesia (Greysia Polii & Apriani Rahayu) (f)
    - Mixed: China (He Jiting & Du Yue)
  - June 27 – July 2: 2017 Chinese Taipei Open Grand Prix Gold in Taipei
    - Singles: (Chinese Taipei) Chou Tien-chen (m) / (Japan) Saena Kawakami (f)
    - Doubles: Chinese Taipei (Chen Hung-ling & Wang Chi-lin) (m) / South Korea (Chae Yoo-jung & Kim So-yeong) (f)
    - Mixed: South Korea (Seo Seung-jae & Kim Ha-na)
  - July 11 – 16: 2017 Canada Open Grand Prix in Calgary
    - Singles: (Japan) Kanta Tsuneyama (m) / (Japan) Saena Kawakami (f)
    - Doubles: England (Peter Briggs & Tom Wolfenden) (m) / Japan (Mayu Matsumoto & Wakana Nagahara) (f)
    - Mixed: South Korea (Kim Won-ho & Shin Seung-chan)
  - July 18 – 23: 2017 Russia Open Grand Prix in Vladivostok
    - Singles: (Russia) Sergey Sirant (m) / (Russia) Evgeniya Kosetskaya (f)
    - Doubles: Russia (Vladimir Ivanov & Ivan Sozonov) (m) / Japan (Akane Araki & Aoi Matsuda) (f)
    - Mixed: Malaysia (Chan Peng Soon & Cheah Yee See)
  - July 19 – 23: 2017 U.S. Open Grand Prix Gold in (United States) Anaheim, California
    - Singles: (India) Prannoy Kumar (m) / (Japan) Aya Ohori (f)
    - Doubles: Japan (Takuto Inoue & Yuki Kaneko) (m) / South Korea (Lee So-hee & Shin Seung-chan) (f)
    - Mixed: South Korea (Seo Seung-jae & Kim Ha-na)
  - September 4 – 10: 2017 Vietnam Open Grand Prix in Ho Chi Minh City
    - Singles: (Thailand) Khosit Phetpradab (m) / (Japan) Sayaka Takahashi (f)
    - Doubles: Indonesia (Wahyu Nayaka & Ade Yusuf) (m) / Thailand (Chayanit Chaladchalam & Phataimas Muenwong) (f)
    - Mixed: Indonesia (Alfian Eko Prasetya & Melati Daeva Oktavianti)
  - October 10 – 15: 2017 Dutch Open Grand Prix in (Netherlands) Almere
    - Singles: (Japan) Kento Momota (m) / (United States) Zhang Beiwen (f)
    - Doubles: Chinese Taipei (Liao Min-chun & Su Cheng-heng) (m) / Indonesia (Della Destiara Haris & Rizki Amelia Pradipta) (f)
    - Mixed: England (Marcus Ellis& Lauren Smith)
  - October 31 – November 5: 2017 Bitburger Open Grand Prix Gold in (Germany) Saarbrücken
    - Singles: (Denmark) Rasmus Gemke (m) / (Thailand) Nichaon Jindapon (f)
    - Doubles: Denmark (Kim Astrup & Anders Skaarup Rasmussen) (m) / Thailand (Jongkolphan Kititharakul & Rawinda Prajongjai) (f)
    - Mixed: Denmark (Anders Skaarup Rasmussen & Line Kjærsfeldt)
  - November 22 – 26: 2017 Scottish Open Grand Prix in (Scotland) Glasgow
    - Singles: (England) Toby Penty (m) / (Scotland) Kirsty Gilmour (f)
    - Doubles: Netherlands (Jelle Maas & Robin Tabeling) (m) / Netherlands (Selena Piek & Cheryl Seinen) (f)
    - Mixed: Netherlands (Jacco Arends & Selena Piek)
  - November 28 – December 3: 2017 Korea Masters Grand Prix Gold (final) in Seoul
    - Singles: (South Korea) Jeon Hyeok-jin (m) / (China) Gao Fangjie (f)
    - Doubles: South Korea (Kim Won-ho & Seo Seung-jae) (m) / South Korea (Lee So-hee & Shin Seung-chan) (f)
    - Mixed: South Korea (Seo Seung-jae & Kim Ha-na)
  - December 5 – 10: 2017 Indonesian Masters Grand Prix Gold in (Indonesia) Jakarta
    - Event cancelled.
