= 2017 BWF Grand Prix Gold and Grand Prix =

The 2017 BWF Grand Prix Gold and Grand Prix was the eleventh season of the BWF Grand Prix Gold and Grand Prix.

== Schedule ==
Below is the schedule released by Badminton World Federation:

Tour	Official title	Venue	City	Date		Prize money USD	Report
Tour	Official title	Venue	City	Start	Finish	Prize money USD	Report
1	Malaysia Masters Grand Prix Gold	Sibu Indoor Stadium	Sibu	January 17	January 22	120,000	Report
2	(India) Syed Modi International Grand Prix Gold	Babu Banarasi Das Indoor Stadium	Lucknow	January 24	January 29	120,000	Report
3	Thailand Masters Grand Prix Gold	Nimibutr Stadium	Bangkok	February 7	February 12	120,000	Report
4	(Germany) German Open Grand Prix Gold	Innogy Sporthalle	Mulheim an der Ruhr	February 28	March 5	120,000	Report
5	(Switzerland) Swiss Open Grand Prix Gold	St. Jakobshalle	Basel	March 14	March 19	120,000	Report
6	China Masters Grand Prix Gold	Olympic Sport Center Xincheng Gymnasium	Changzhou	April 18	April 23	150,000	Report
7	Thailand Open Grand Prix Gold	Nimibutr Stadium	Bangkok	May 30	June 4	120,000	Report
8	Chinese Taipei Open Grand Prix Gold	Taipei Arena	Taipei	June 27	July 2	200,000	Report
9	Canada Open Grand Prix	Markin-MacPhail Centre	Calgary	July 11	July 16	65,000	Report
10	(Russia) Russian Open Grand Prix	Sport Hall Olympic	Vladivostok	July 18	July 23	65,000	Report
11	(United States) U.S. Open Grand Prix Gold	Anaheim Convention Center	Anaheim	July 19	July 23	120,000	Report
12	New Zealand Open Grand Prix Gold	North Shore Events Centre	Auckland	August 1	August 6	120,000	Report
13	Vietnam Open Grand Prix	Nguyen Du Cultural Sports Club	Ho Chi Minh City	September 4	September 10	65,000	Report
14	(Netherlands) Dutch Open Grand Prix	Topsportcentrum	Almere	October 10	October 15	65,000	Report
15	(Germany) Bitburger Open Grand Prix Gold	Saarlandhalle	Saarbrücken	October 31	November 5	120,000	Report
16	Macau Open Grand Prix Gold	Tap Seac Multisport Pavilion	Macau	November 7	November 12	120,000	Report
17	(Scotland) Scottish Open Grand Prix	Emirates Arena	Glasgow	November 21	November 26	65,000	Report
18	(South Korea) Korea Masters Grand Prix Gold	Yeomju Gymnasium	Gwangju	November 28	December 3	120,000	Report

BWF Grand Prix Gold

== Results ==
=== Winners ===
Tour	Men's singles	Women's singles	Men's doubles	Women's doubles	Mixed doubles
Malaysia	(Hong Kong) Ng Ka Long	(India) Saina Nehwal	(Indonesia) Berry Angriawan (Indonesia) Hardianto	(Thailand) Jongkolphan Kititharakul (Thailand) Rawinda Prajongjai	(Malaysia) Tan Kian Meng (Malaysia) Lai Pei Jing
India	(India) Sameer Verma	(India) P. V. Sindhu	(Denmark) Mathias Boe (Denmark) Carsten Mogensen	(Denmark) Kamilla Rytter Juhl (Denmark) Christinna Pedersen	(India) Pranaav Jerry Chopra (India) N. Sikki Reddy
(Thailand) Thai Masters	(Indonesia) Tommy Sugiarto	(Thailand) Busanan Ongbumrungpan	(China) Huang Kaixiang (China) Wang Yilu	(China) Chen Qingchen (China) Jia Yifan	(China) Zhang Nan (China) Li Yinhui
Germany	(Chinese Taipei) Chou Tien-chen	(Japan) Akane Yamaguchi	(Denmark) Kim Astrup (Denmark) Anders Skaarup Rasmussen	(Japan) Yuki Fukushima (Japan) Sayaka Hirota	(China) Zhang Nan (China) Li Yinhui
(Switzerland) Swiss	(China) Lin Dan	(China) Chen Xiaoxin	(China) Chai Biao (China) Hong Wei	(China) Chen Qingchen (China) Jia Yifan	(Thailand) Dechapol Puavaranukroh (Thailand) Sapsiree Taerattanachai
China	(China) Tian Houwei	(Japan) Aya Ohori	(Chinese Taipei) Chen Hung-ling (Chinese Taipei) Wang Chi-lin	(China) Bao Yixin (China) Yu Xiaohan	(China) Wang Yilu (China) Huang Dongping
(Thailand) Thai Open	(India) B. Sai Praneeth	(Thailand) Ratchanok Intanon	(Indonesia) Berry Angriawan (Indonesia) Hardianto	(Indonesia) Greysia Polii (Indonesia) Apriyani Rahayu	(China) He Jiting (China) Du Yue
(Chinese Taipei) Taipei	(Chinese Taipei) Chou Tien-chen	(Japan) Saena Kawakami	(Chinese Taipei) Chen Hung-ling (Chinese Taipei) Wang Chi-lin	(South Korea) Chae Yoo-jung (South Korea) Kim So-yeong	(South Korea) Seo Seung-jae (South Korea) Kim Ha-na
Canada	(Japan) Kanta Tsuneyama	(Japan) Saena Kawakami	(England) Peter Briggs (England) Tom Wolfenden	(Japan) Mayu Matsumoto (Japan) Wakana Nagahara	(South Korea) Kim Won-ho (South Korea) Shin Seung-chan
Russia	(Russia) Sergey Sirant	(Russia) Evgeniya Kosetskaya	(Russia) Vladimir Ivanov (Russia) Ivan Sozonov	(Japan) Akane Araki (Japan) Aoi Matsuda	(Malaysia) Chan Peng Soon (Malaysia) Cheah Yee See
(United States) U.S.A.	(India) H. S. Prannoy	(Japan) Aya Ohori	(Japan) Takuto Inoue (Japan) Yuki Kaneko	(South Korea) Lee So-hee (South Korea) Shin Seung-chan	(South Korea) Seo Seung-jae (South Korea) Kim Ha-na
New Zealand	(Hong Kong) Lee Cheuk Yiu	(Thailand) Ratchanok Intanon	(Chinese Taipei) Chen Hung-ling (Chinese Taipei) Wang Chi-lin	(Malaysia) Vivian Hoo Kah Mun (Malaysia) Woon Khe Wei	(Indonesia) Ronald Alexander (Indonesia) Annisa Saufika
Vietnam	(Thailand) Khosit Phetpradab	(Japan) Sayaka Takahashi	(Indonesia) Wahyu Nayaka (Indonesia) Ade Yusuf	(Thailand) Chayanit Chaladchalam (Thailand) Phataimas Muenwong	(Indonesia) Alfian Eko Prasetya (Indonesia) Melati Daeva Oktavianti
Netherlands	(Japan) Kento Momota	(United States) Beiwen Zhang	(Chinese Taipei) Liao Min-chun (Chinese Taipei) Su Cheng-heng	(Indonesia) Della Destiara Haris (Indonesia) Rizki Amelia Pradipta	(England) Marcus Ellis (England) Lauren Smith
(Germany) Bitburger	(Denmark) Rasmus Gemke	(Thailand) Nitchaon Jindapol	(Denmark) Kim Astrup (Denmark) Anders Skaarup Rasmussen	(Thailand) Jongkolphan Kititharakul (Thailand) Rawinda Prajongjai	(China) He Jiting (China) Du Yue
Macau	(Japan) Kento Momota	(China) Cai Yanyan	(Indonesia) Wahyu Nayaka (Indonesia) Ade Yusuf	(China) Huang Yaqiong (China) Yu Xiaohan	(China) Zheng Siwei (China) Huang Yaqiong
Scotland	(England) Toby Penty	(Scotland) Kirsty Gilmour	(Netherlands) Jelle Maas (Netherlands) Robin Tabeling	(Netherlands) Selena Piek (Netherlands) Cheryl Seinen	(Netherlands) Jacco Arends (Netherlands) Selena Piek
(South Korea) Korea	(South Korea) Jeon Hyeok-jin	(China) Gao Fangjie	(South Korea) Kim Won-ho (South Korea) Seo Seung-jae	(South Korea) Lee So-hee (South Korea) Shin Seung-chan	(South Korea) Seo Seung-jae (South Korea) Kim Ha-na

=== Performance by countries ===
Tabulated below are the Grand Prix performances based on countries. Only countries who have won a title are listed:

S.no	Team	MAS	IND	THA	GER	SUI	CHN	THA	TPE	CAN	RUS	USA	NZL	VIE	NED	GER	MAC	SCO	KOR	Total
1	China			3	1	4	3	1								1	3		1	17
2	Japan				2		1		1	3	1	2		1	1		1			13
3	Indonesia	1		1				2					1	2	1		1			9
3	South Korea								2	1		2							4	9
3	Thailand	1		1		1		1					1	2		2				9
6	Chinese Taipei				1		1		2				1		1					6
6	India	1	3					1				1								6
8	Denmark		2		1											2				5
9	England									1					1			1		3
9	Malaysia	1									1		1							3
9	Netherlands																	3		3
9	Russia										3									3
13	Hong Kong	1											1							2
14	United States														1					1
14	Scotland																	1		1

== Grand Prix Gold ==
=== Malaysia Masters ===
Category	Winners	Runners-up	Score
Men's singles	(Hong Kong) Ng Ka Long	(South Korea) Lee Hyun-il	14–21, 21–15, 10–9 Retired
Women's singles	(India) Saina Nehwal	(Thailand) Pornpawee Chochuwong	22–20, 22–20
Men's doubles	(Indonesia) Berry Angriawan / Hardianto	(Malaysia) Goh Sze Fei / Nur Izzuddin	21–19, 21–12
Women's doubles	(Thailand) Jongkolphan Kititharakul / Rawinda Prajongjai	(Hong Kong) Poon Lok Yan / Tse Ying Suet	21–17, 21–9
Mixed doubles	(Malaysia) Tan Kian Meng / Lai Pei Jing	(Malaysia) Goh Soon Huat / Shevon Jemie Lai	21–17, 21–9

=== Syed Modi International ===
Category	Winners	Runners-up	Score
Men's singles	(India) Sameer Verma	(India) B. Sai Praneeth	21–19, 21–16
Women's singles	(India) P. V. Sindhu	(Indonesia) Gregoria Mariska Tunjung	21–13, 21–14
Men's doubles	(Denmark) Mathias Boe / Carsten Mogensen	(Chinese Taipei) Lu Ching-yao / Yang Po-han	21–14, 21–15
Women's doubles	(Denmark) Kamilla Rytter Juhl / Christinna Pedersen	(India) Ashwini Ponnappa / N. Sikki Reddy	21–16, 21–18
Mixed doubles	(India) Pranaav Jerry Chopra / N. Sikki Reddy	(India) B. Sumeeth Reddy / Ashwini Ponnappa	22–20, 21–10

=== Thailand Masters ===
Category	Winners	Runners-up	Score
Men's singles	(Indonesia) Tommy Sugiarto	(Thailand) Kantaphon Wangcharoen	21–17, 21–11
Women's singles	(Thailand) Busanan Ongbumrungpan	(Japan) Aya Ohori	21–18, 21–16
Men's doubles	(China) Huang Kaixiang / Wang Yilu	(Chinese Taipei) Lu Ching-yao / Yang Po-han	21–19, 21–23, 21–16
Women's doubles	(China) Chen Qingchen / Jia Yifan	(Thailand) Puttita Supajirakul / Sapsiree Taerattanachai	21–16, 21–15
Mixed doubles	(China) Zhang Nan / Li Yinhui	(Thailand) Dechapol Puavaranukroh / Sapsiree Taerattanachai	21–11, 20–22, 21–13

=== German Open ===
Category	Winners	Runners-up	Score
Men's singles	(Chinese Taipei) Chou Tien-chen	(Chinese Taipei) Wang Tzu-wei	21–16, 21–14
Women's singles	(Japan) Akane Yamaguchi	(Spain) Carolina Marín	Walkover
Men's doubles	(Denmark) Kim Astrup / Anders Skaarup Rasmussen	(Denmark) Mads Conrad-Petersen / Mads Pieler Kolding	21–17, 21–13
Women's doubles	(Japan) Yuki Fukushima / Sayaka Hirota	(China) Huang Dongping / Li Yinhui	15–21, 21–17, 21–15
Mixed doubles	(China) Zhang Nan / Li Yinhui	(China) Lu Kai / Huang Yaqiong	22–20, 21–11

=== Swiss Open ===
Category	Winners	Runners-up	Score
Men's singles	(China) Lin Dan	(China) Shi Yuqi	21–12, 21–11
Women's singles	(China) Chen Xiaoxin	(China) Chen Yufei	21–19, 21–14
Men's doubles	(China) Chai Biao / Hong Wei	(China) Liu Cheng / Zhang Nan	13–21, 21–16, 21–15
Women's doubles	(China) Chen Qingchen / Jia Yifan	(Bulgaria) Gabriela Stoeva / Stefani Stoeva	21–16, 21–15
Mixed doubles	(Thailand) Dechapol Puavaranukroh / Sapsiree Taerattanachai	(Indonesia) Praveen Jordan / Debby Susanto	21–18, 21–15

=== China Masters ===
Category	Winners	Runners-up	Score
Men's singles	(China) Tian Houwei	(China) Qiao Bin	21–15, 15–21, 21–16
Women's singles	(Japan) Aya Ohori	(Japan) Saena Kawakami	21–9, 9–21, 21–18
Men's doubles	(Chinese Taipei) Chen Hung-ling / Wang Chi-lin	(Japan) Takuto Inoue / Yuki Kaneko	21–14, 21–6
Women's doubles	(China) Bao Yixin / Yu Xiaohan	(China) Huang Yaqiong / Tang Jinhua	8–21, 21–14, 21–17
Mixed doubles	(China) Wang Yilu / Huang Dongping	(Chinese Taipei) Liao Min-chun / Chen Hsiao-huan	21–14, 21–10

=== Thailand Open ===
Category	Winners	Runners-up	Score
Men's singles	(India) B. Sai Praneeth	(Indonesia) Jonatan Christie	17–21, 21–18, 21–19
Women's singles	(Thailand) Ratchanok Intanon	(Thailand) Busanan Ongbumrungpan	21–18, 12–21, 21–16
Men's doubles	(Indonesia) Berry Angriawan / Hardianto	(Germany) Raphael Beck / Peter Kaesbauer	21–16, 21–16
Women's doubles	(Indonesia) Greysia Polii / Apriyani Rahayu	(Thailand) Chayanit Chaladchalam / Phataimas Muenwong	21–12, 21–12
Mixed doubles	(China) He Jiting / Du Yue	(Malaysia) Goh Soon Huat / Shevon Jemie Lai	21–13, 16–21, 21–12

=== Chinese Taipei Open ===
Category	Winners	Runners-up	Score
Men's singles	(Chinese Taipei) Chou Tien-chen	(Chinese Taipei) Wang Tzu-wei	18–21, 21–19, 21–15
Women's singles	(Japan) Saena Kawakami	(Malaysia) Goh Jin Wei	21–17, 21–17
Men's doubles	(Chinese Taipei) Chen Hung-ling / Wang Chi-lin	(Chinese Taipei) Lee Jhe-huei / Lee Yang	21–16, 22–20
Women's doubles	(South Korea) Chae Yoo-jung / Kim So-yeong	(South Korea) Kim Hye-rin / Yoo Hae-won	21–12, 21–11
Mixed doubles	(South Korea) Seo Seung-jae / Kim Ha-na	(Chinese Taipei) Wang Chi-lin / Lee Chia-hsin	22–20, 21–10

=== U.S. Open ===
Category	Winners	Runners-up	Score
Men's singles	(India) H. S. Prannoy	(India) Parupalli Kashyap	21–15, 20–22, 21–12
Women's singles	(Japan) Aya Ohori	(Canada) Michelle Li	21–11, 21–19
Men's doubles	(Japan) Takuto Inoue / Yuki Kaneko	(Chinese Taipei) Lu Ching-yao / Yang Po-han	15–21, 21–13, 21–13
Women's doubles	(South Korea) Lee So-hee / Shin Seung-chan	(Japan) Mayu Matsumoto / Wakana Nagahara	21–16, 21–13
Mixed doubles	(South Korea) Seo Seung-jae / Kim Ha-na	(South Korea) Kim Won-ho / Shin Seung-chan	16–21, 21–14, 21–11

=== New Zealand Open ===
Category	Winners	Runners-up	Score
Men's singles	(Hong Kong) Lee Cheuk Yiu	(Chinese Taipei) Wang Tzu-wei	11–21, 21–15, 22–20
Women's singles	(Thailand) Ratchanok Intanon	(Japan) Saena Kawakami	21–14, 16–21, 21–15
Men's doubles	(Chinese Taipei) Chen Hung-ling / Wang Chi-lin	(Malaysia) Ong Yew Sin / Teo Ee Yi	21–16, 21–18
Women's doubles	(Malaysia) Vivian Hoo Kah Mun / Woon Khe Wei	(Japan) Ayako Sakuramoto / Yukiko Takahata	18–21, 21–16, 21–19
Mixed doubles	(Indonesia) Ronald Alexander / Annisa Saufika	(Australia) Sawan Serasinghe / Setyana Mapasa	21–19, 21–14

=== Bitburger Open ===
Category	Winners	Runners-up	Score
Men's singles	(Denmark) Rasmus Gemke	(Chinese Taipei) Hsu Jen-hao	21–18, 21–10
Women's singles	(Thailand) Nitchaon Jindapol	(United States) Beiwen Zhang	21–17, 15–21, 21–19
Men's doubles	(Denmark) Kim Astrup / Anders Skaarup Rasmussen	(Indonesia) Fajar Alfian / Muhammad Rian Ardianto	21–19, 19–21, 21–18
Women's doubles	(Thailand) Jongkolphan Kititharakul / Rawinda Prajongjai	(Japan) Akane Araki / Aoi Matsuda	21–19, 21–6
Mixed doubles	(China) He Jiting / Du Yue	(Denmark) Anders Skaarup Rasmussen / Line Kjaersfeldt	21–18, 21–17

=== Macau Open ===
Category	Winners	Runners-up	Score
Men's singles	(Japan) Kento Momota	(Indonesia) Ihsan Maulana Mustofa	21–16, 21–10
Women's singles	(China) Cai Yanyan	(Chinese Taipei) Pai Yu-po	21–15, 17–21, 21–16
Men's doubles	(Indonesia) Wahyu Nayaka / Ade Yusuf	(South Korea) Kim Won-ho / Seo Seung-jae	21–13, 21–14
Women's doubles	(China) Huang Yaqiong / Yu Xiaohan	(South Korea) Baek Ha-na / Lee Yu-rim	21–10, 21–17
Mixed doubles	(China) Zheng Siwei / Huang Yaqiong	(South Korea) Seo Seung-jae / Kim Ha-na	21–14, 21–11

=== Korea Masters ===
Category	Winners	Runners-up	Score
Men's singles	(South Korea) Jeon Hyeok-jin	(South Korea) Kim Min-ki	21–17, 19–21, 21–12
Women's singles	(China) Gao Fangjie	(South Korea) Lee Jang-mi	21–19, 21–5
Men's doubles	(South Korea) Kim Won-ho / Seo Seung-jae	(South Korea) Jung Jae-wook / Kim Gi-jung	21–15, 21–16
Women's doubles	(South Korea) Lee So-hee / Shin Seung-chan	(South Korea) Kim So-yeong / Kong Hee-yong	21–18, 23–21
Mixed doubles	(South Korea) Seo Seung-jae / Kim Ha-na	(South Korea) Choi Sol-gyu / Chae Yoo-jung	17–21, 21–13, 21–18

== Grand Prix ==
=== Canada Open ===
Category	Winners	Runners-up	Score
Men's singles	(Japan) Kanta Tsuneyama	(Japan) Kento Momota	22–20, 14–21, 21–14
Women's singles	(Japan) Saena Kawakami	(Scotland) Kirsty Gilmour	19–21, 21–19, 21–18
Men's doubles	(England) Peter Briggs / Tom Wolfenden	(South Korea) Kim Won-ho / Seo Seung-jae	22–20, 16–21, 21–19
Women's doubles	(Japan) Mayu Matsumoto / Wakana Nagahara	(Japan) Chisato Hoshi / Naru Shinoya	21–16, 16–21, 21–18
Mixed doubles	(South Korea) Kim Won-ho / Shin Seung-chan	(South Korea) Choi Sol-gyu / Chae Yoo-jung	21–19, 21–16

=== Russian Open ===
Category	Winners	Runners-up	Score
Men's singles	(Russia) Sergey Sirant	(Russia) Vladimir Malkov	13–11, 11–5, 6–11, 7–11, 11–4
Women's singles	(Russia) Evgeniya Kosetskaya	(Malaysia) Sonia Cheah Su Ya	11–9, 5–11, 11–5, 5–11, 11–4
Men's doubles	(Russia) Vladimir Ivanov / Ivan Sozonov	(Malaysia) Chooi Kah Ming / Low Juan Shen	11–6, 11–9, 11–5
Women's doubles	(Japan) Akane Araki / Aoi Matsuda	(Japan) Yuho Imai / Minami Kawashima	11–6, 6–11, 11–7, 7–11, 11–5
Mixed doubles	(Malaysia) Chan Peng Soon / Cheah Yee See	(Japan) Keiichiro Matsui / Akane Araki	11–8, 13–11, 11–3

=== Vietnam Open ===
Category	Winners	Runners-up	Score
Men's singles	(Thailand) Khosit Phetpradab	(Thailand) Suppanyu Avihingsanon	21–15, 21–19
Women's singles	(Japan) Sayaka Takahashi	(Vietnam) Vu Thi Trang	21–9, 21–14
Men's doubles	(Indonesia) Wahyu Nayaka / Ade Yusuf	(Chinese Taipei) Liao Min-chun / Su Cheng-heng	12–21, 21–16, 23–21
Women's doubles	(Thailand) Chayanit Chaladchalam / Phataimas Muenwong	(Indonesia) Della Destiara Haris / Rizki Amelia Pradipta	21–16, 21–19
Mixed doubles	(Indonesia) Alfian Eko Prasetya / Melati Daeva Oktavianti	(Indonesia) Riky Widianto / Masita Mahmudin	21–14, 21–14

=== Dutch Open ===
Category	Winners	Runners-up	Score
Men's singles	(Japan) Kento Momota	(Japan) Yu Igarashi	21–10, 21–12
Women's singles	(United States) Beiwen Zhang	(Canada) Michelle Li	21–16, 21–14
Men's doubles	(Chinese Taipei) Liao Min-chun / Su Cheng-heng	(Japan) Takuto Inoue / Yuki Kaneko	24–22, 21–18
Women's doubles	(Indonesia) Della Destiara Haris / Rizki Amelia Pradipta	(Indonesia) Anggia Shitta Awanda / Ni Ketut Mahadewi Istirani	21–17, 21–16
Mixed doubles	(England) Marcus Ellis / Lauren Smith	(Netherlands) Jacco Arends / Selena Piek	21–17, 21–18

=== Scottish Open ===
Category	Winners	Runners-up	Score
Men's singles	(England) Toby Penty	(France) Lucas Corvée	21–14, 24–22
Women's singles	(Scotland) Kirsty Gilmour	(Denmark) Mia Blichfeldt	23–21, 21–12
Men's doubles	(Netherlands) Jelle Maas / Robin Tabeling	(Netherlands) Jacco Arends / Ruben Jille	21–11, 21–15
Women's doubles	(Netherlands) Selena Piek / Cheryl Seinen	(Russia) Ekaterina Bolotova / Alina Davletova	15–21, 21–15, 21–11
Mixed doubles	(Netherlands) Jacco Arends / Selena Piek	(Denmark) Mikkel Mikkelsen / Mai Surrow	21–10, 21–10
