= 2017 Bitburger Open Grand Prix Gold =

Bitburger Open Grand Prix Gold
Tournament details
- Dates: 31 October – 5 November 2017
- Level: Grand Prix Gold
- Total prize money: US$120,000
- Venue: Saarlandhalle
- Location: Saarbrücken, Germany

Champions
- Men's singles: (Denmark) Rasmus Gemke
- Women's singles: (Thailand) Nitchaon Jindapol
- Men's doubles: (Denmark) Kim Astrup (Denmark) Anders Skaarup Rasmussen
- Women's doubles: (Thailand) Jongkolphan Kititharakul (Thailand) Rawinda Prajongjai
- Mixed doubles: (China) He Jiting (China) Du Yue

The 2017 Bitburger Open was a badminton tournament which took place at Saarlandhalle in Saarbrücken in Germany from 31 October to 5 November 2017 and had a total purse of $120,000.

== Tournament ==
The 2017 Bitburger Open Grand Prix Gold was the fifteenth Grand Prix's badminton tournament of the 2017 BWF Grand Prix Gold and Grand Prix and also part of the Bitburger Open championships which has been held since 1988. This tournament was organized by the 1. BC Saarbrücken-Bischmisheim, with the sanctioned from the BWF.

=== Venue ===
This international tournament was held at Saarlandhalle in Saarbrücken in the Germany.

=== Point distribution ===
Below is the tables with the point distribution for each phase of the tournament based on the BWF points system for the Grand Prix Gold event.

Winner	Runner-up	3/4	5/8	9/16	17/32	33/64	65/128	129/256	257/512	513/1024
7,000	5,950	4,900	3,850	2,750	1,670	660	320	130	60	30

=== Prize money ===
The total prize money for the 2017 tournament was US$120,000. Distribution of prize money was in accordance with BWF regulations.

Event	Winner	Finals	Semifinals	Quarterfinals	Last 16
Singles	$9,000	$4,560	$1,740	$720	$420
Doubles	$9,480	$4,560	$1,680	$870	$450

== Men's singles ==
=== Seeds ===
1. (Denmark) Anders Antonsen (withdrew)
2. (England) Rajiv Ouseph (third round)
3. (France) Brice Leverdez (quarterfinals)
4. (Chinese Taipei) Hsu Jen-hao (final)
5. (China) Huang Yuxiang (quarterfinals)
6. (China) Qiao Bin (third round)
7. (Brazil) Ygor Coelho (quarterfinals)
8. (Thailand) Khosit Phetpradab (quarterfinals)
9. (Denmark) Emil Holst (third round)
10. (Germany) Fabian Roth (withdrew)
11. (Chinese Taipei) Lin Yu-hsien (third round)
12. (Netherlands) Mark Caljouw (semifinals)
13. (Thailand) Suppanyu Avihingsanon (third round)
14. (Malaysia) Lee Zii Jia (semifinals)
15. (Denmark) Kim Bruun (third round)
16. (Malaysia) Iskandar Zulkarnain Zainuddin (third round)

=== Finals ===
Quarterfinals
(Denmark) Rasmus Gemke	21	15	21
7	(Brazil) Ygor Coelho	12	21	12
3	(France) Brice Leverdez	21	18	10
14	(Malaysia) Lee Zii Jia	19	21	21
5	(China) Huang Yuxiang	21	15	17
4	(Chinese Taipei) Hsu Jen-hao	13	21	21
8	(Thailand) Khosit Phetpradab	18	23	14
12	(Netherlands) Mark Caljouw	21	21	21

Semifinals
(Denmark) Rasmus Gemke	21	21
14	(Malaysia) Lee Zii Jia	11	12
4	(Chinese Taipei) Hsu Jen-hao	21	16	21
12	(Netherlands) Mark Caljouw	15	21	14

Final
(Denmark) Rasmus Gemke	21	21
4	(Chinese Taipei) Hsu Jen-hao	18	10

=== Top half ===
==== Section 1 ====
First round
PFQ	(Germany) C Skrzeba	18	12
(Scotland) K Merrilees	21	21
(Denmark) R Gemke	21	21
(Germany) A Roovers	14	12
13	(Thailand) S Avihingsanon	21	21
(Switzerland) M Bonny	16	10
(Belgium) B Abts	21	16	22
(Bulgaria) A Vlaar	16	21	24

Second round
(Scotland) K Merrilees	21	12	18
(Denmark) R Gemke	12	21	21
13	(Thailand) S Avihingsanon	21	21
(Bulgaria) A Vlaar	18	18

Third round
(Denmark) R Gemke	21	19	21
13	(Thailand) S Avihingsanon	17	21	18

==== Section 2 ====
First round
7	(Brazil) Y Coelho	21	21
(Belgium) R Scheurkogel	18	8
(England) M S-Smith	7	9
(Netherlands) E Meijs	21	21
PFQ	(Indonesia) P Sudrajat	21	21
(Italy) R Maddaloni	15	9
(Germany) D Peng	13	19
(France) T J Popov	21	21

Second round
7	(Brazil) Y Coelho	23	24
(Netherlands) E Meijs	21	22
PFQ	(Indonesia) P Sudrajat	14	20
(France) T J Popov	21	22

Third round
7	(Brazil) Y Coelho	21	21
(France) T J Popov	16	13

==== Section 3 ====
First round
3	(France) B Leverdez	21	21
PFQ	(Germany) H Gerberich	11	19
PFQ	(England) R Webster	3	5
Q6	(Luxembourg) M Vallenthini	21	21
11	(Chinese Taipei) Lin Y-h	21	23
(Romania) C V Filimon	11	21
(Russia) A Parakhodin	10	8
(England) Y Wang	21	21

Second round
3	(France) B Leverdez	21	21
Q6	(Luxembourg) M Vallenthini	12	13
11	(Chinese Taipei) Lin Y-h	21	21
(England) Y Wang	13	12

Third round
3	(France) B Leverdez	18	21	21
11	(Chinese Taipei) Lin Y-h	21	9	6

==== Section 4 ====
First round
6	(China) Qiao B	21	21
Q2	(Switzerland) Q Filliettaz	12	6
(Germany) J Persson	15	20
(Italy) G Greco	21	22
14	(Malaysia) Lee Z J	21	21
(Germany) L Schänzler	14	18
(Croatia) Z Đurkinjak	19	14
(Ukraine) A Pochtarev	21	21

Second round
6	(China) Qiao B	21	21
(Italy) G Greco	12	12
14	(Malaysia) Lee Z J	21	21
(Ukraine) A Pochtarev	13	11

Third round
6	(China) Qiao B	17	12
14	(Malaysia) Lee Z J	21	21

=== Bottom half ===
==== Section 5 ====
First round
(Germany) M Weisskirchen	21	21
Q1	(Luxembourg) Y Zaccaria	6	8
(Germany) S Hsiao	10	5
16	(Malaysia) I Z Zainuddin	21	21
(Italy) L Osele	21	14	8
Q3	(Germany) Z Xie	15	21	21
(Luxembourg) R Mann	16	16
5	(China) Huang YX	21	21

Second round
(Germany) M Weisskirchen	13	12
16	(Malaysia) I Z Zainuddin	21	21
Q3	(Germany) Z Xie	17	14
5	(China) Huang YX	21	21

Third round
16	(Malaysia) I Z Zainuddin	17	21	8
5	(China) Huang YX	21	15	21

==== Section 6 ====
First round
(Germany) P Lang	21	15	17
(Ukraine) V Atrashchenkov	8	21	21
(Finland) E Heino	12	12
9	(Denmark) E Holst	21	21
(France) L Claerbout	21	21
(Republic of Ireland) J Magee	14	16
(Switzerland) J König	9	9
4	(Chinese Taipei) Hsu J-h	21	21

Second round
(Ukraine) V Atrashchenkov	10	12
9	(Denmark) E Holst	21	21
(France) L Claerbout	14	15
4	(Chinese Taipei) Hsu J-h	21	21

Third round
9	(Denmark) E Holst	21	9	13
4	(Chinese Taipei) Hsu J-h	14	21	21

==== Section 7 ====
First round
Q4	(Luxembourg) M Sonderskov	15	19
Q5	(Germany) C Offermann	21	21
(Switzerland) C Kirchmayr	15	15
15	(Denmark) K Bruun	21	21
(Germany) K Schaefer	21	21
PFQ	(Ukraine) D Zavadsky	4	9
(Germany) P Discher	15	12
8	(Thailand) K Phetpradab	21	21

Second round
Q5	(Germany) C Offermann	6	17
15	(Denmark) K Bruun	21	21
(Germany) K Schaefer	10	14
8	(Thailand) K Phetpradab	21	21

Third round
15	(Denmark) K Bruun	17	13
8	(Thailand) K Phetpradab	21	21

==== Section 8 ====
First round
(France) L Corvée	21	21
Q7	(Germany) D Kramer	16	11
(Belgium) M Moreels	23	11	13
12	(Netherlands) M Caljouw	21	21	21
(Austria) W Gnedt	21	18	16
(Germany) S Wang	14	21	21
Q8	(Switzerland) N Lenggenhager	10	12
2	(England) R Ouseph	21	21

Second round
(France) L Corvée	21	15	14
12	(Netherlands) M Caljouw	19	21	21
(Germany) S Wang	21	10	7
2	(England) R Ouseph	19	21	21

Third round
12	(Netherlands) M Caljouw	21	11	21
2	(England) R Ouseph	16	21	14

== Women's singles ==
=== Seeds ===
1. (United States) Beiwen Zhang (final)
2. (Thailand) Nitchaon Jindapol (champion)
3. (Thailand) Busanan Ongbumrungpan (first round)
4. (China) Chen Xiaoxin (semifinals)
5. (Scotland) Kirsty Gilmour (first round)
6. (Spain) Beatriz Corrales (first round)
7. (Thailand) Pornpawee Chochuwong (second round)
8. (Malaysia) Soniia Cheah (first round)

=== Finals ===
Semifinals
1	(United States) Beiwen Zhang	17	21	21
(Chinese Taipei) Pai Yu-po	21	6	9
4	(China) Chen Xiaoxin	14	16
2	(Thailand) Nitchaon Jindapol	21	21

Final
1	(United States) Beiwen Zhang	17	21	19
2	(Thailand) Nitchaon Jindapol	21	15	21

=== Top half ===
==== Section 1 ====
First round
1	(United States) B Zhang	21	21
(Mauritius) K F Kune	8	11
(Ukraine) M Ulitina	21	16	13
(Denmark) L Kjaersfeldt	11	21	21
5	(Scotland) K Gilmour	15	15
(Chinese Taipei) Lee C-h	21	21
(Russia) N Perminova	18	21	21
Q1	(England) C Birch	21	19	23

Second round
1	(United States) B Zhang	18	21	21
(Denmark) L Kjaersfeldt	21	13	13
(Chinese Taipei) Lee C-h	21	21
Q1	(England) C Birch	8	19

Quarterfinals
1	(United States) B Zhang	21	21
(Chinese Taipei) Lee C-h	7	12

==== Section 2 ====
First round
3	(Thailand) B Ongbumrungpan	19	10^{r}
(Chinese Taipei) Pai Y-p	21	12
(Indonesia) H Ramadini	21	21
(France) D Lansac	16	13
6	(Spain) B Corrales	21	17	15
(Germany) F Deprez	14	21	21
(Chinese Taipei) Sung S-y	21	19	21
(Denmark) S H Dahl	14	21	8

Second round
(Chinese Taipei) Pai Y-p	17	21	21
(Indonesia) H Ramadini	21	19	16
(Germany) F Deprez	13	18
(Chinese Taipei) Sung S-y	21	21

Quarterfinals
(Chinese Taipei) Pai Y-p	21	21
(Chinese Taipei) Sung S-y	5	17

=== Bottom half ===
==== Section 3 ====
First round
Q2	(Switzerland) A Huser	11	15
(Indonesia) D D Ayustine	21	21
(Denmark) M Blichfeldt	23	20	17
7	(Thailand) P Chochuwong	21	22	21
(Germany) L Heim	21	21
(Bulgaria) M Mitsova	19	17
Q4	(Denmark) J D Jakobsen	16	11
4	(China) Chen XX	21	21

Second round
(Indonesia) D D Ayustine	21	13	22
7	(Thailand) P Chochuwong	19	21	20
(Germany) L Heim	17	14
4	(China) Chen XX	21	21

Quarterfinals
(Indonesia) D D Ayustine	8	16
4	(China) Chen XX	21	21

==== Section 4 ====
First round
(Chinese Taipei) Chiang M-h	21	21
(England) F M Wright	15	19
Q3	(Germany) Y Li	25	21
8	(Malaysia) Sonia C S Y	23	17
(Canada) M Li	14	21	21
(Denmark) N K Rohde	21	19	16
(Denmark) M Poulsen	13	17
2	(Thailand) N Jindapol	21	21

Second round
(Chinese Taipei) Chiang M-h	21	21
Q3	(Germany) Y Li	17	19
(Canada) M Li	21	21	7
2	(Thailand) N Jindapol	18	23	21

Quarterfinals
(Chinese Taipei) Chiang M-h	12	16
2	(Thailand) N Jindapol	21	21

== Men's doubles ==
=== Seeds ===
1. (Chinese Taipei) Chen Hung-ling / Wang Chi-lin (quarterfinals)
2. (Denmark) Kim Astrup / Anders Skaarup Rasmussen (champion)
3. (Thailand) Bodin Isara / Nipitphon Phuangphuapet (semifinals)
4. (Indonesia) Fajar Alfian / Muhammad Rian Ardianto (final)
5. (Denmark) Mathias Christiansen / David Daugaard (semifinals)
6. (Malaysia) Goh V Shem / Teo Ee Yi (quarterfinals)
6. (Malaysia) Ong Yew Sin / Tan Wee Kiong (quarterfinals)
8. (England) Marcus Ellis / Chris Langridge (withdrew)

=== Finals ===
Semifinals
5	(Denmark) Mathias Christiansen (Denmark) David Daugaard	21	16	20
4	(Indonesia) Fajar Alfian (Indonesia) Muhammad Rian Ardianto	15	21	22
3	(Thailand) Bodin Isara (Thailand) Nipitphon Phuangphuapet	19	10
2	(Denmark) Kim Astrup (Denmark) Anders Skaarup Rasmussen	21	21

Final
4	(Indonesia) Fajar Alfian (Indonesia) Muhammad Rian Ardianto	19	21	18
2	(Denmark) Kim Astrup (Denmark) Anders Skaarup Rasmussen	21	19	21

=== Top half ===
==== Section 1 ====
First round
1	(Chinese Taipei) Chen H-l (Chinese Taipei) Wang C-l	21	21	21
(England) B Lane (England) S Vendy	23	14	14
(Germany) M Lamsfuss (Germany) M E Seidel	21	8	21
(England) P Briggs (England) T Wolfenden	18	21	13
5	(Denmark) M Christiansen (Denmark) D Daugaard	21	18	21
(Scotland) A Dunn (Scotland) A Hall	14	21	15
PFQ	(Denmark) K Antonsen (Denmark) N Nohr	21	10	21
(Russia) K Abramov (Russia) A Zinchenko	15	21	10

Second round
1	(Chinese Taipei) Chen H-l (Chinese Taipei) Wang C-l	21	21
(Germany) M Lamsfuss (Germany) M E Seidel	17	19
5	(Denmark) M Christiansen (Denmark) D Daugaard	20	21	21
PFQ	(Denmark) K Antonsen (Denmark) N Nohr	22	15	12

Quarterfinals
1	(Chinese Taipei) Chen H-l (Chinese Taipei) Wang C-l	18	21
5	(Denmark) M Christiansen (Denmark) D Daugaard	21	23

==== Section 2 ====
First round
4	(Indonesia) F Alfian (Indonesia) M R Ardianto	21	21
(Netherlands) J Arends (Netherlands) R Jille	17	10
(Thailand) T Isriyanet (Thailand) K Namdash	8
Q2	(Russia) N Khakimov (Russia) A Parakhodin	1^{r}
6	(Malaysia) Goh V S (Malaysia) Teo E Y	21	21
(France) B Kersaudy (France) J Maio	12	16
(China) He JT (China) Tan Q	21	21
Q4	(Switzerland) M Bonny (Switzerland) O Schaller	15	11

Second round
4	(Indonesia) F Alfian (Indonesia) M R Ardianto	21	9	21
(Thailand) T Isriyanet (Thailand) K Namdash	15	21	17
6	(Malaysia) Goh V S (Malaysia) Teo E Y	21	10	21
(China) He JT (China) Tan Q	19	21	19

Quarterfinals
4	(Indonesia) F Alfian (Indonesia) M R Ardianto	21	21
6	(Malaysia) Goh V S (Malaysia) Teo E Y	12	15

=== Bottom half ===
==== Section 3 ====
First round
(Republic of Ireland) J Magee (Republic of Ireland) S Magee	21	13	21
(Belgium) M Dierickx (Belgium) F Golinski	10	21	17
(Italy) L Osele (Italy) K Strobl	14	14
PFQ	(France) T Gicquel (France) R Labar	21	21
Q1	(Malaysia) N M A Ayub (Malaysia) Ooi Z H	21	16	21
(Netherlands) J Maas (Netherlands) R Tabeling	17	21	18
(Russia) V Durkin (Russia) N Ukk	9	12
3	(Thailand) B Isara (Thailand) N Phuangphuapet	21	21

Second round
(Republic of Ireland) J Magee (Republic of Ireland) S Magee	16	10
PFQ	(France) T Gicquel (France) R Labar	21	21
Q1	(Malaysia) N M A Ayub (Malaysia) Ooi Z H	12	8
3	(Thailand) B Isara (Thailand) N Phuangphuapet	21	21

Quarterfinals
PFQ	(France) T Gicquel (France) R Labar	15	14
3	(Thailand) B Isara (Thailand) N Phuangphuapet	21	21

==== Section 4 ====
First round
(Germany) D Benz (Germany) A Heinz	15	13
(Denmark) M B-Smidt (Denmark) F Søgaard	21	21
Q3	(Germany) P Lang (Germany) T Legleitner
6	(Malaysia) Ong Y S (Malaysia) Tan W K	w	/	o
(Scotland) M Campbell (Scotland) P MacHugh	21	11	11
(Germany) J R Jansen (Germany) J Zurwonne	10	21	21
(Malaysia) Goh S F (Malaysia) N Izzuddin	10	13
2	(Denmark) K Astrup (Denmark) A S Rasmussen	21	21

Second round
(Denmark) M B-Smidt (Denmark) F Søgaard	18	17
6	(Malaysia) Ong Y S (Malaysia) Tan W K	21	21
(Germany) J R Jansen (Germany) J Zurwonne	21	15	17
2	(Denmark) K Astrup (Denmark) A S Rasmussen	19	21	21

Quarterfinals
6	(Malaysia) Ong Y S (Malaysia) Tan W K	18	12
2	(Denmark) K Astrup (Denmark) A S Rasmussen	21	21

== Women's doubles ==
=== Seeds ===
1. (Bulgaria) Gabriela Stoeva / Stefani Stoeva (semifinals)
2. (Thailand) Jongkolphan Kititharakul / Rawinda Prajongjai (champion)
3. (Denmark) Sara Thygesen / Maiken Fruergaard (second round)
4. (Russia) Olga Morozova / Anastasia Chervyakova (quarterfinals)
5. (China) Du Yue / Xu Ya (semifinals)
6. (England) Lauren Smith / Sarah Walker (second round)
7. (Denmark) Julie Finne-Ipsen / Rikke Søby (withdrew)
8. (Germany) Carla Nelte / Isabel Herttrich (quarterfinals)

=== Finals ===
Semifinals
1	(Bulgaria) Gabriela Stoeva (Bulgaria) Stefani Stoeva	17	11
(Japan) Akane Araki (Japan) Aoi Matsuda	21	21
5	(China) Du Yue (China) Xu Ya	15	14
2	(Thailand) Jongkolphan Kititharakul (Thailand) Rawinda Prajongjai	21	21

Final
(Japan) Akane Araki (Japan) Aoi Matsuda	19	6
2	(Thailand) Jongkolphan Kititharakul (Thailand) Rawinda Prajongjai	21	21

=== Top half ===
==== Section 1 ====
First round
1	(Bulgaria) G Stoeva (Bulgaria) S Stoeva	w	/	o
(Russia) T Bibik (Russia) I Khlebko
(Germany) L Efler (Germany) E Janssens	21	21
(Russia) N Perminova (Russia) N Vislova	16	16
8	(Germany) I Herttrich (Germany) C Nelte	21	17	23
(Denmark) A Bøje (Denmark) S Lundgaard	15	21	21
(France) E Lefel (France) A Tran	18	19
(Thailand) S Amitrapai (Thailand) P Chochuwong	21	21

Second round
1	(Bulgaria) G Stoeva (Bulgaria) S Stoeva	21	21
(Germany) L Efler (Germany) E Janssens	14	8
8	(Germany) I Herttrich (Germany) C Nelte	21	11	21
(Thailand) S Amitrapai (Thailand) P Chochuwong	18	21	17

Quarterfinals
1	(Bulgaria) G Stoeva (Bulgaria) S Stoeva	21	21
8	(Germany) I Herttrich (Germany) C Nelte	19	18

==== Section 2 ====
First round
3	(Denmark) M Fruergaard (Denmark) S Thygesen	21	21
(Germany) A Horbach (Germany) C J Jansen	14	9
(Japan) A Araki (Japan) A Matsuda	21	21
(Russia) O Arkhangelskaya (Russia) N Rogova	11	15
6	(England) L Smith (England) S Walker	21	21
(Switzerland) N Fankhauser (Netherlands) I Tabeling	9	10
(Netherlands) S Piek (Netherlands) C Seinen	21	21
(Germany) A Dörr (Germany) F Volkmann	13	17

Second round
3	(Denmark) M Fruergaard (Denmark) S Thygesen	21	19	12
(Japan) A Araki (Japan) A Matsuda	19	21	21
6	(England) L Smith (England) S Walker	21	17	19
(Netherlands) S Piek (Netherlands) C Seinen	16	21	21

Quarterfinals
(Japan) A Araki (Japan) A Matsuda	21	21
(Netherlands) S Piek (Netherlands) C Seinen	17	15

=== Bottom half ===
==== Section 3 ====
First round
(England) C Birch (England) J Pugh	22	15	21
(France) D Delrue (France) L Palermo	20	21	17
(Switzerland) C Burkart (Germany) J Petrikowski	4^{r}
5	(China) Du Y (China) Xu Y	11
(Finland) J Nyström (Finland) S Pekkola	17	8
(Germany) J Goliszewski (Germany) L Kaepplein	21	21
(Germany) O Konon (Republic of Ireland) C Magee	21	17
4	(Russia) A Chervyakova (Russia) O Morozova	23	21

Second round
(England) C Birch (England) J Pugh	18	12
5	(China) Du Y (China) Xu Y	21	21
(Germany) J Goliszewski (Germany) L Kaepplein	21	8	17
4	(Russia) A Chervyakova (Russia) O Morozova	14	21	21

Quarterfinals
5	(China) Du Y (China) Xu Y	21	21
4	(Russia) A Chervyakova (Russia) O Morozova	14	16

==== Section 4 ====
First round
(Germany) L Kaminski (Germany) H Pohl	9	14
(Ukraine) M Ilyinskaya (Ukraine) Y Zharka	21	21
(Italy) S Garino (Italy) L Iversen	w	/	o
7	(Denmark) J F-Ipsen (Denmark) R Søby
(Latvia) I Pope (Latvia) M Radovska	10	9
(Malaysia) Soong F C (Malaysia) Tee J Y	21	21
(Belgium) L Jaques (Belgium) F Vandenhoucke	11	19
2	(Thailand) J Kititharakul (Thailand) R Prajongjai	21	21

Second round
(Ukraine) M Ilyinskaya (Ukraine) Y Zharka	21	21
(Italy) S Garino (Italy) L Iversen	12	19
(Malaysia) Soong F C (Malaysia) Tee J Y	8	10
2	(Thailand) J Kititharakul (Thailand) R Prajongjai	21	21

Quarterfinals
(Ukraine) M Ilyinskaya (Ukraine) Y Zharka	15	10
2	(Thailand) J Kititharakul (Thailand) R Prajongjai	21	21

== Mixed doubles ==
=== Seeds ===
1. (England) Chris Adcock / Gabrielle Adcock (withdrew)
2. (Chinese Taipei) Wang Chi-lin / Lee Chia-hsin (second round)
3. (Thailand) Bodin Isara / Savitree Amitrapai (quarterfinals)
4. (Germany) Mark Lamsfuss / Isabel Herttrich (first round)
5. (Republic of Ireland) Sam Magee / Chloe Magee (second round)
6. (Indonesia) Ronald Alexander / Annisa Saufika (withdrew)
7. (France) Ronan Labar / Audrey Fontaine (second round)
8. (Thailand) Nipitphon Phuangphuapet / Jongkolphan Kititharakul (quarterfinals)

=== Finals ===
Semifinals
(China) He Jiting (China) Du Yue	21	21
(Indonesia) Hafiz Faisal (Indonesia) Gloria Emanuelle Widjaja	18	15
Q1	(Denmark) Anders Skaarup Rasmussen (Denmark) Line Kjaersfeldt	22	21
(England) Marcus Ellis (England) Lauren Smith	20	17

Final
(China) He Jiting (China) Du Yue	21	21
Q1	(Denmark) Anders Skaarup Rasmussen (Denmark) Line Kjaersfeldt	18	17

=== Top half ===
==== Section 1 ====
First round
PFQ	(Ukraine) A Pochtarov (Ukraine) N Voytsekh	17	13
(Finland) A Kaisti (Finland) J Nyström	21	21
(Netherlands) J Maas (Netherlands) I Van Der Aar	16	12
(China) He JT (China) Du Y	21	21
7	(France) R Labar (France) A Fontaine	21	11	21
(Thailand) T Isriyanet (Thailand) P Chochuwong	16	21	17
(Denmark) M Mikkelsen (Denmark) M Surrow	14	17
(Germany) M E Seidel (Germany) L Efler	21	21

Second round
(Finland) A Kaisti (Finland) J Nyström	17	20
(China) He JT (China) Du Y	21	22
7	(France) R Labar (France) A Fontaine	21	16	14
(Germany) M E Seidel (Germany) L Efler	17	21	21

Quarterfinals
(China) He JT (China) Du Y	17	21	21
(Germany) M E Seidel (Germany) L Efler	21	16	15

==== Section 2 ====
First round
3	(Thailand) B Isara (Thailand) S Amitrapai	21	21
(Netherlands) R Jille (France) E Lefel	9	15
Q3	(Germany) J Pistorius (Germany) L Kaepplein	21	21
PFQ	(Germany) A Heinz (Germany) A Horbach	15	18
5	(Republic of Ireland) S Magee (Republic of Ireland) C Magee	21	21
(France) T Gicquel (France) D Delrue	18	19
(Indonesia) H Faisal (Indonesia) G E Widjaja	21	18	21
(Russia) A Zinchenko (Russia) O Morozova	15	21	15

Second round
3	(Thailand) B Isara (Thailand) S Amitrapai	21	21
Q3	(Germany) J Pistorius (Germany) L Kaepplein	12	15
5	(Republic of Ireland) S Magee (Republic of Ireland) C Magee	16	18
(Indonesia) H Faisal (Indonesia) G E Widjaja	21	21

Quarterfinals
3	(Thailand) B Isara (Thailand) S Amitrapai	9	18
(Indonesia) H Faisal (Indonesia) G E Widjaja	21	21

=== Bottom half ===
==== Section 3 ====
First round
(Switzerland) O Schaller (Switzerland) C Burkart	16	15
(Netherlands) R Tabeling (Netherlands) C Seinen	21	21
Q4	(China) Tan Q (China) Xu Y	11	17
PFQ	(Russia) V Durkin (Russia) N Vislova	21	21
Q2	(Germany) P Scheiel (Germany) F Volkmann	17	19
Q1	(Denmark) A S Rasmussen (Denmark) L Kjaersfeldt	21	21
(Denmark) N Nøhr (Denmark) S Thygesen	21	21	21
4	(Germany) M Lamsfuss (Germany) I Herttrich	23	18	18

Second round
(Netherlands) R Tabeling (Netherlands) C Seinen	18	11
PFQ	(Russia) V Durkin (Russia) N Vislova	21	21
Q1	(Denmark) A S Rasmussen (Denmark) L Kjaersfeldt	21	21
(Denmark) N Nøhr (Denmark) S Thygesen	14	14

Quarterfinals
PFQ	(Russia) V Durkin (Russia) N Vislova	20	11
Q1	(Denmark) A S Rasmussen (Denmark) L Kjaersfeldt	22	21

==== Section 4 ====
First round
(Netherlands) J Arends (Netherlands) S Piek	w	/	o
(Russia) A Parakhodin (Russia) N Rogova
(Denmark) M B-Smidt (Denmark) A Bøje	18	18
8	(Thailand) N Phuangphuapet (Thailand) J Kititharakul	21	21
(France) B Kersaudy (France) L Palermo	16	9
(England) M Ellis (England) L Smith	21	21
(England) B Lane (England) J Pugh	15	18
2	(Chinese Taipei) Wang C-l (Chinese Taipei) Lee C-h	21	21

Second round
(Netherlands) J Arends (Netherlands) S Piek	20	17
8	(Thailand) N Phuangphuapet (Thailand) J Kititharakul	22	21
(England) M Ellis (England) L Smith	22	13	21
2	(Chinese Taipei) Wang C-l (Chinese Taipei) Lee C-h	20	21	19

Quarterfinals
8	(Thailand) N Phuangphuapet (Thailand) J Kititharakul	19	19
(England) M Ellis (England) L Smith	21	21

Preceded by 2017 Dutch Open Grand Prix	BWF Grand Prix Gold and Grand Prix; 2017 BWF Season	Succeeded by 2017 Macau Open Grand Prix Gold
