= 2017 Dutch Open Grand Prix =

Tournament details
- Dates: 10–15 October
- Level: Grand Prix
- Total prize money: US$65,000
- Venue: Topsportcentrum
- Location: Almere, Netherlands

Champions
- Men's singles: (Japan) Kento Momota
- Women's singles: (United States) Beiwen Zhang
- Men's doubles: (Chinese Taipei) Liao Min-chun (Chinese Taipei) Su Cheng-heng
- Women's doubles: (Indonesia) Della Destiara Haris (Indonesia) Rizki Amelia Pradipta
- Mixed doubles: (England) Marcus Ellis (England) Lauren Smith

The 2017 Dutch Open Grand Prix officially Yonex Dutch Open 2017 was a badminton tournament which took place at Topsportcentrum in Almere in the Netherlands on 10 to 15 October 2017 and had a total purse of $65,000.

== Tournament ==
The 2017 Dutch Open Grand Prix is the fourteenth Grand Prix's badminton tournament of the 2017 BWF Grand Prix Gold and Grand Prix and also part of the Dutch Open championships which has been held since 1932. This tournament organized by the Badminton Nederland, with the sanctioned from the BWF.

=== Venue ===
This international tournament will be held at Topsportcentrum Pierre de Coubertinplein 4 in Almere in the Netherlands.

=== Point distribution ===
Below is the tables with the point distribution for each phase of the tournament based on the BWF points system for the Grand Prix event.

Winner	Runner-up	3/4	5/8	9/16	17/32	33/64	65/128	129/256	257/512	513/1024
5,500	4,680	3,850	3,030	2,110	1,290	510	240	100	45	30

=== Prize money ===
The total prize money for this year tournament is US$65,000. Distribution of prize money will be in accordance with BWF regulations.

Event	Winner	Finals	Semifinals	Quarterfinals	Last 16
Singles	$4,875	$2,470	$942.50	$390	$227.50
Doubles	$5,135	$2,470	$910	$471.25	$243.75

== Men's singles ==
=== Seeds ===
1. (Chinese Taipei) Wang Tzu-wei (semifinals)
2. (India) Ajay Jayaram (withdrew)
3. (Denmark) Hans-Kristian Vittinghus (quarterfinals)
4. (Germany) Fabian Roth (withdrew)
5. (Denmark) Emil Holst (quarterfinals)
6. (Spain) Pablo Abián (third round)
7. (Netherlands) Mark Caljouw (semifinals)
8. (Russia) Vladimir Malkov (third round)
9. (France) Lucas Corvée (second round)
10. (Israel) Misha Zilberman (quarterfinals)
11. (Scotland) Kieran Merrilees (third round)
12. (Finland) Eetu Heino (second round)
13. (Japan) Yu Igarashi (final)
14. (Denmark) Rasmus Gemke (second round)
15. (India) Subhankar Dey (third round)
16. (Finland) Kalle Koljonen (second round)

=== Finals ===
Quarterfinals
1	(Chinese Taipei) Wang Tzu-wei	21	21
5	(Denmark) Emil Holst	19	19
10	(Israel) Misha Zilberman
13	(Japan) Yu Igarashi	w	/	o
(Japan) Kento Momota	21	21
3	(Denmark) Hans-Kristian Vittinghus	12	18
7	(Netherlands) Mark Caljouw	21	21
(Ukraine) Artem Pochtarov	4	14

Semifinals
1	(Chinese Taipei) Wang Tzu-wei	21	14	17
13	(Japan) Yu Igarashi	17	21	21
(Japan) Kento Momota	21	21
7	(Netherlands) Mark Caljouw	16	6

Final
13	(Japan) Yu Igarashi	10	12
(Japan) Kento Momota	21	21

=== Top half ===
==== Section 1 ====
First round
1	(Chinese Taipei) Wang T-w	21	19	21
(India) P Joshi	8	21	19
PFQ	(Czech Republic) J Janáček	7	12
(Norway) M Myhre	21	21
16	(Finland) K Koljonen	21	21
(Republic of Ireland) J Magee	8	16
(Netherlands) E Meijs	21	14	21
(Spain) L E Peñalver	9	21	17

Second round
1	(Chinese Taipei) Wang T-w	21	21
(Norway) M Myhre	10	5
16	(Finland) K Koljonen	16	11
(Netherlands) E Meijs	21	21

Third round
1	(Chinese Taipei) Wang T-w	21	21
(Netherlands) E Meijs	15	19

==== Section 2 ====
First round
5	(Denmark) E Holst	21	21
Q8	(Russia) A Parakhodin	6	8
(Denmark) S T Hansen	21	14	21
(France) L Claerbout	15	21	8
15	(India) S Dey	21	21
Q5	(Japan) N Yamazawa	14	18
Q2	(Germany) M Weißkirchen	21	17	17
(Belgium) M Moreels	12	21	21

Second round
5	(Denmark) E Holst	21	21
(Denmark) S T Hansen	16	14
15	(India) S Dey	21	21
(Belgium) M Moreels	13	14

Third round
5	(Denmark) E Holst	14	22	21
15	(India) S Dey	21	20	11

==== Section 3 ====
First round
PFQ	(Bulgaria) A Vlaar	21	10	11
PFQ	(Denmark) M Enghøj	18	21	21
(Hungary) G Krausz	21	19
(Croatia) Z Đurkinjak	23	21
10	(Israel) M Zilberman	10
(England) Y Wang	0^{r}
(Netherlands) N Fransman	21	21
(Czech Republic) L Zevl	10	13

Second round
PFQ	(Denmark) M Enghøj	16	18
(Croatia) Z Đurkinjak	21	21
10	(Israel) M Zilberman	21	22
(Netherlands) N Fransman	17	20

Third round
(Croatia) Z Đurkinjak	21	12	13
10	(Israel) M Zilberman	18	21	21

==== Section 4 ====
First round
8	(Russia) V Malkov	21	24	22
(Sweden) J Nilsson	23	22	20
(India) R Y Chittaboina	22	21	13
(Germany) A Roovers	20	23	21
13	(Japan) Y Igarashi	21	21
Q7	(Czech Republic) O Král	9	10
(Germany) D Peng	21	23	21
(Switzerland) C Kirchmayr	17	25	18

Second round
8	(Russia) V Malkov	14	21	21
(Germany) A Roovers	21	14	15
13	(Japan) Y Igarashi	21	21
(Germany) D Peng	13	11

Third round
8	(Russia) V Malkov	15	13
13	(Japan) Y Igarashi	21	21

=== Bottom half ===
==== Section 5 ====
First round
(Republic of Ireland) S Evans	18	17
(Japan) K Momota	21	21
(Czech Republic) M Ludík	11	16
9	(France) L Corvée	21	21
(France) T Rouxel	19	16
(Germany) K Schäfer	21	21
PFQ	(England) M Spencer-Smith	9	14
6	(Spain) P Abián	21	21

Second round
(Japan) K Momota	21	22
9	(France) L Corvée	16	20
(Germany) K Schäfer	14	18
6	(Spain) P Abián	21	21

Third round
(Japan) K Momota	21	21
6	(Spain) P Abián	16	8

==== Section 6 ====
First round
(Israel) D Chislov	20	11
(Germany) L Schänzler	22	21
(India) K R Rajarajan	11	14
11	(Scotland) K Merrilees	21	21
(Finland) H Aarnio	21	21
(India) S Sipani	14	18
(Finland) I Heino	11	9
3	(Denmark) H-K Vittinghus	21	21

Second round
(Germany) L Schänzler	13	14
11	(Scotland) K Merrilees	21	21
(Finland) H Aarnio	23	19
3	(Denmark) H-K Vittinghus	25	21

Third round
11	(Scotland) K Merrilees	9	21	14
3	(Denmark) H-K Vittinghus	21	16	21

==== Section 7 ====
First round
(Japan) R Takeshita	21	21
Q4	(Chinese Taipei) Kan C-y	14	10
Q1	(Germany) P Lang	14	9
14	(Denmark) R Gemke	21	21
(Russia) S Sirant	21	21
(Denmark) V Svendsen	18	12
Q6	(Germany) J Persson	21	7	12
7	(Netherlands) M Caljouw	17	21	21

Second round
(Japan) R Takeshita	16	22	28
14	(Denmark) R Gemke	21	20	26
(Russia) S Sirant	20	13
7	(Netherlands) M Caljouw	22	21

Third round
(Japan) R Takeshita	21	17	14
7	(Netherlands) M Caljouw	19	21	21

==== Section 8 ====
First round
(Sweden) F Burestedt	21	23
(Bulgaria) I Rusev	19	21
(Switzerland) M Bonny	16	13
12	(Finland) E Heino	21	21
Q3	(Greece) I Xanthou	7	17
(Chinese Taipei) Lu C-h	21	21
(Ukraine) A Pochtarov	21	21
PFQ	(Mexico) A Hernández	9	17

Second round
(Sweden) F Burestedt	21	24
12	(Finland) E Heino	16	22
(Chinese Taipei) Lu C-h	21	14	19
(Ukraine) A Pochtarov	18	21	21

Third round
(Sweden) F Burestedt	20	19
(Ukraine) A Pochtarov	22	21

== Women's singles ==
=== Seeds ===
1. (United States) Beiwen Zhang (champion)
2. (Denmark) Mette Poulsen (quarterfinals)
3. (Denmark) Mia Blichfeldt (quarterfinals)
4. (Bulgaria) Linda Zetchiri (withdrew)
5. (Denmark) Natalia Koch Rohde (semifinals)
6. (Canada) Michelle Li (final)
7. (Germany) Fabienne Deprez (second round)
8. (Japan) Haruko Suzuki (quarterfinals)

=== Finals ===
Semifinals
1	(United States) Beiwen Zhang	21	21
(Ukraine) Marija Ulitina	9	11
6	(Canada) Michelle Li	22	21
5	(Denmark) Natalia Koch Rohde	20	14

Final
1	(United States) Beiwen Zhang	21	21
6	(Canada) Michelle Li	16	14

=== Top half ===
==== Section 1 ====
First round
1	(United States) B Zhang	21	21
Q4	(Japan) Y Nakai	17	11
(England) C Birch	10	8
(India) R S Gadde	21	21
8	(Japan) H Suzuki	21	21
(Denmark) J D Jakobsen	15	19
(France) D Lansac	21	11	21
(Mauritius) K Foo Kune	12	21	16

Second round
1	(United States) B Zhang	21	21
(India) R S Gadde	11	13
8	(Japan) H Suzuki	15	21	21
(France) D Lansac	21	14	13

Quarterfinals
1	(United States) B Zhang	21	21
8	(Japan) H Suzuki	11	12

==== Section 2 ====
First round
3	(Denmark) M Blichfeldt	21	21
(Hungary) Á Kőrösi	11	4
(Spain) C Azurmendi	21	21
(Finland) A Mikkelä	10	14
7	(Germany) F Deprez	21	21
(Denmark) I A Andersen	8	13
(Ukraine) M Ulitina	15	21	21
(India) R Karthik	21	13	19

Second round
3	(Denmark) M Blichfeldt	22	21
(Spain) C Azurmendi	20	18
7	(Germany) F Deprez	18	24	14
(Ukraine) M Ulitina	21	22	21

Quarterfinals
3	(Denmark) M Blichfeldt	21	16	19
(Ukraine) M Ulitina	16	21	21

=== Bottom half ===
==== Section 3 ====
First round
(Germany) Y Li	19	20
(Russia) N Perminova	21	22
(Ukraine) N Voytsekh	6	10
6	(Canada) M Li	21	21
PFQ	(Czech Republic) K Tomalová	13	7
(Denmark) S H Dahl	21	21
Q2	(Russia) O Arkhangelskaya	18	11
PFQ	(Estonia) G Saar	21	21

Second round
(Russia) N Perminova	24	17
6	(Canada) M Li	26	21
(Denmark) S H Dahl	21	23
PFQ	(Estonia) G Saar	13	21

Quarterfinals
6	(Canada) M Li	15	21	21
(Denmark) S H Dahl	21	11	19

==== Section 4 ====
First round
(Germany) L Heim	13	21	21
Q3	(Switzerland) A Huser	21	15	10
(India) S K P Kudaravalli	12	10
5	(Denmark) N K Rohde	21	21
(Netherlands) G Mahulette	21	17	21
(Belgium) L Tan	11	21	17
Q1	(Wales) J Hart	22	11
2	(Denmark) M Poulsen	24	21

Second round
(Germany) L Heim	12	9
5	(Denmark) N K Rohde	21	21
(Netherlands) G Mahulette	18	16
2	(Denmark) M Poulsen	21	21

Quarterfinals
5	(Denmark) N K Rohde	21	18	21
2	(Denmark) M Poulsen	19	21	12

== Men's doubles ==
=== Seeds ===
1. (Indonesia) Ricky Karanda Suwardi / Angga Pratama (second round)
2. (Japan) Takuto Inoue / Yuki Kaneko (final)
3. (England) Marcus Ellis / Chris Langridge (quarterfinals)
4. (Indonesia) Berry Angriawan / Hardianto (semifinals)
5. (Chinese Taipei) Liao Min-chun / Su Cheng-heng (champion)
6. (Germany) Jones Ralfy Jansen / Josche Zurwonne (semifinals)
7. (India) Manu Attri / B. Sumeeth Reddy (first round)
8. (England) Peter Briggs / Tom Wolfenden (second round)

=== Finals ===
Semifinals
6	(Germany) Jones Ralfy Jansen (Germany) Josche Zurwonne	17	17
5	(Chinese Taipei) Liao Min-chun (Chinese Taipei) Su Cheng-heng	21	21
4	(Indonesia) Berry Angriawan (Indonesia) Hardianto	18	15
2	(Japan) Takuto Inoue (Japan) Yuki Kaneko	21	21

Final
5	(Chinese Taipei) Liao Min-chun (Chinese Taipei) Su Cheng-heng	24	21
2	(Japan) Takuto Inoue (Japan) Yuki Kaneko	22	18

=== Top half ===
==== Section 1 ====
First round
1	(Indonesia) R K Suwardi (Indonesia) A Pratama	21	22	21
(Japan) K Gondo (Japan) T Watanabe	11	24	16
(France) B Kersaudy (France) J Maio	12	21	21
Q3	(Russia) N Khakimov (Russia) A Parakhodin	21	17	19
6	(Germany) J R Jansen (Germany) J Zurwonne	21	21
(Belgium) M Dierickx (Belgium) F Golinski	16	18
(Russia) K Abramov (Russia) A Zinchenko	21	21
(Denmark) M Mikkelsen (Denmark) N Overgaard	19	17

Second round
1	(Indonesia) R K Suwardi (Indonesia) A Pratama	16	20
(France) B Kersaudy (France) J Maio	21	22
6	(Germany) J R Jansen (Germany) J Zurwonne	23	23	21
(Russia) K Abramov (Russia) A Zinchenko	25	21	15

Quarterfinals
(France) B Kersaudy (France) J Maio	18	20
6	(Germany) J R Jansen (Germany) J Zurwonne	21	22

==== Section 2 ====
First round
3	(England) M Ellis (England) C Langridge	21	21
PFQ	(England) R Golding (England) V Liew	6	9
Q4	(Germany) N Persson (Germany) A Trisnanto	21	21
(Scotland) M Campbell (Scotland) P MacHugh	19	19
5	(Chinese Taipei) Liao M-c (Chinese Taipei) Su C-h	21	21
(India) S Rankireddy (India) C Shetty	17	14
(Netherlands) J Arends (Netherlands) R Jille	21	21
(Finland) H Aarnio (Finland) I Heino	10	19

Second round
3	(England) M Ellis (England) C Langridge	19	21	21
Q4	(Germany) N Persson (Germany) A Trisnanto	21	11	14
5	(Chinese Taipei) Liao M-c (Chinese Taipei) Su C-h	21	19	21
(Netherlands) J Arends (Netherlands) R Jille	11	21	8

Quarterfinals
3	(England) M Ellis (England) C Langridge	20	27	19
5	(Chinese Taipei) Liao M-c (Chinese Taipei) Su C-h	22	25	21

=== Bottom half ===
==== Section 3 ====
First round
(England) B Lane (England) S Vendy	21	21
Q2	(Russia) V Durkin (Russia) V Malkov	14	13
(Scotland) A Dunn (Scotland) A Hall	9	6^{r}
8	(England) P Briggs (England) T Wolfenden	21	8
PFQ	(England) M Clare (England) G Mairs	21	15	21
PFQ	(Malaysia) Low H Y (Malaysia) Tan J H	12	21	15
(Denmark) M Bay-Smidt (Denmark) F Søgaard	5	21	13
4	(Indonesia) B Angriawan (Indonesia) Hardianto	21	18	21

Second round
(England) B Lane (England) S Vendy	21	21
8	(England) P Briggs (England) T Wolfenden	15	14
PFQ	(England) M Clare (England) G Mairs	8	16
4	(Indonesia) B Angriawan (Indonesia) Hardianto	21	21

Quarterfinals
(England) B Lane (England) S Vendy	15	17
4	(Indonesia) B Angriawan (Indonesia) Hardianto	21	21

==== Section 4 ====
First round
(Malaysia) Shia C K (Malaysia) Tan W G	21	21
(Republic of Ireland) J Magee (Republic of Ireland) S Magee	19	14
(Netherlands) J Maas (Netherlands) R Tabeling	21	22
7	(India) M Attri (India) B. S Reddy	13	20
Q1	(Switzerland) M Bonny (Switzerland) O Schaller	10	19
(Japan) K Matsui (Japan) Y Takeuchi	21	21
(Germany) D Benz (Germany) A Heinz	17	11
2	(Japan) T Inoue (Japan) Y Kaneko	21	21

Second round
(Malaysia) Shia C K (Malaysia) Tan W G	21	23
(Netherlands) J Maas (Netherlands) R Tabeling	15	21
(Japan) K Matsui (Japan) Y Takeuchi	21	13	14
2	(Japan) T Inoue (Japan) Y Kaneko	18	21	21

Quarterfinals
(Malaysia) Shia C K (Malaysia) Tan W G	14	19
2	(Japan) T Inoue (Japan) Y Kaneko	21	21

== Women's doubles ==
=== Seeds ===
1. (Indonesia) Anggia Shitta Awanda / Ni Ketut Mahadewi Istirani (final)
2. (Malaysia) Lim Yin Loo / Yap Cheng Wen (semifinals)
3. (Malaysia) Chow Mei Kuan / Lee Meng Yean (quarterfinals)
4. (India) Ashwini Ponnappa / N. Sikki Reddy (withdrew)
5. (England) Lauren Smith / Sarah Walker (quarterfinals)
6. (Denmark) Julie Finne-Ipsen / Rikke Søby (withdrew)
7. (Japan) Ayako Sakuramoto / Yukiko Takahata (semifinals)
8. (Germany) Johanna Goliszewski / Lara Käpplein (second round)

=== Finals ===
Semifinals
1	(Indonesia) Anggia Shitta Awanda (Indonesia) Ni Ketut Mahadewi Istirani	21	21
7	(Japan) Ayako Sakuramoto (Japan) Yukiko Takahata	11	15
(Indonesia) Della Destiara Haris (Indonesia) Rizki Amelia Pradipta	21	23
2	(Malaysia) Lim Yin Loo (Malaysia) Yap Cheng Wen	8	21

Final
1	(Indonesia) Anggia Shitta Awanda (Indonesia) Ni Ketut Mahadewi Istirani	17	16
(Indonesia) Della Destiara Haris (Indonesia) Rizki Amelia Pradipta	21	21

=== Top half ===
==== Section 1 ====
First round
1	(Indonesia) A S Awanda (Indonesia) N K M Istirani	21	21
(India) M Kukkapalli (India) A S Sunil	16	11
Q4	(Germany) K Holenz (Germany) A Molitor	9	3
(France) D Delrue (France) L Palermo	21	21
5	(England) L Smith (England) S Walker	19	21	21
(Germany) L Kaminski (Germany) H Pohl	21	17	14
(Belgium) L Jaques (Belgium) F Vandenhoucke	21	21
Q2	(Netherlands) S de Wit (Netherlands) J van Cruchten	9	10

Second round
1	(Indonesia) A S Awanda (Indonesia) N K M Istirani	21	19	21
(France) D Delrue (France) L Palermo	19	21	10
5	(England) L Smith (England) S Walker	22	19	21
(Belgium) L Jaques (Belgium) F Vandenhoucke	20	21	13

Quarterfinals
1	(Indonesia) A S Awanda (Indonesia) N K M Istirani	21	21
5	(England) L Smith (England) S Walker	12	18

==== Section 2 ====
First round
3	(Malaysia) Chow M K (Malaysia) Lee M Y	w	/	o
(Denmark) J D Jakobsen (Denmark) S-M Jensen
(Germany) L Efler (Germany) E Janssens	17	13
(Russia) O Arkhangelskaya (Russia) N Rogova	21	21
7	(Japan) A Sakuramoto (Japan) Y Takahata	21	21
(Russia) I Khlebko (Russia) E Komendrovskaja	9	8
(Germany) O Konon (Republic of Ireland) C Magee	21	21
(Netherlands) S Piek (Netherlands) C Seinen	18	16

Second round
3	(Malaysia) Chow M K (Malaysia) Lee M Y	21	21
(Russia) O Arkhangelskaya (Russia) N Rogova	18	15
7	(Japan) A Sakuramoto (Japan) Y Takahata	21	21
(Germany) O Konon (Republic of Ireland) C Magee	17	18

Quarterfinals
3	(Malaysia) Chow M K (Malaysia) Lee M Y	15	19
7	(Japan) A Sakuramoto (Japan) Y Takahata	21	21

=== Bottom half ===
==== Section 3 ====
First round
(Russia) N Perminova (Russia) N Vislova	10	11
(England) C Birch (England) J Pugh	21	21
(Ukraine) V Lesnaya (Ukraine) D Samarchants	12	20
8	(Germany) J Goliszewski (Germany) L Käpplein	21	22
(Switzerland) C Burkart (Germany) J Petrikowski	2^{r}
Q1	(Latvia) I Pope (Latvia) M Radovska	5
(Indonesia) D D Haris (Indonesia) R A Pradipta	21	21
PFQ	(Ukraine) M Ilyinskaya (Ukraine) Y Zharka	5	14

Second round
(England) C Birch (England) J Pugh	21	15	21
8	(Germany) J Goliszewski (Germany) L Käpplein	13	21	19
Q1	(Latvia) I Pope (Latvia) M Radovska
(Indonesia) D D Haris (Indonesia) R A Pradipta	w	/	o

Quarterfinals
(England) C Birch (England) J Pugh	18	9
(Indonesia) D D Haris (Indonesia) R A Pradipta	21	21

==== Section 4 ====
First round
(England) J Moore (England) V Williams	28	18	21
(France) É Lefel (France) A Tran	26	21	10
Q3	(Netherlands) D Brehler (Netherlands) C Kuiper	12	8
PFQ	(Switzerland) N Fankhauser (Netherlands) I Tabeling	21	21
(Sweden) A Högström (Sweden) C Nistad	21	21
(Finland) J Nyström (Finland) S Pekkola	18	14
(Netherlands) E Muskens (Netherlands) I van der Aar	21	17
2	(Malaysia) Lim Y L (Malaysia) Yap C W	23	21

Second round
(England) J Moore (England) V Williams	11	17
PFQ	(Switzerland) N Fankhauser (Netherlands) I Tabeling	21	21
(Sweden) A Högström (Sweden) C Nistad	16	12
2	(Malaysia) Lim Y L (Malaysia) Yap C W	21	21

Quarterfinals
PFQ	(Switzerland) N Fankhauser (Netherlands) I Tabeling	21	10
2	(Malaysia) Lim Y L (Malaysia) Yap C W	23	21

== Mixed doubles ==
=== Seeds ===
1. (India) Pranaav Jerry Chopra / N. Sikki Reddy (withdrew)
2. (France) Ronan Labar / Audrey Fontaine (second round)
3. (Republic of Ireland) Sam Magee / Chloe Magee (first round)
4. (England) Ben Lane / Jessica Pugh (semifinals)
5. (Malaysia) Chan Peng Soon / Cheah Yee See (first round)
6. (Netherlands) Jacco Arends / Selena Piek (final)
7. (Netherlands) Robin Tabeling / Cheryl Seinen (first round)
8. (England) Marcus Ellis / Lauren Smith (champion)

=== Finals ===
Semifinals
Q4	(India) Satwiksairaj Rankireddy (India) Ashwini Ponnappa	14	18
8	(England) Marcus Ellis (England) Lauren Smith	21	21
4	(England) Ben Lane (England) Jessica Pugh	19	21	12
6	(Netherlands) Jacco Arends (Netherlands) Selena Piek	21	16	21

Final
8	(England) Marcus Ellis (England) Lauren Smith	21	21
6	(Netherlands) Jacco Arends (Netherlands) Selena Piek	17	18

=== Top half ===
==== Section 1 ====
First round
PFQ	(Germany) J R Jansen (Germany) E Janssens	21	21
(Russia) A Zinchenko (Russia) I Khlebko	10	10
(Denmark) N Mathiasen (Denmark) G Bøje	11	13
(Republic of Ireland) S Evans (Sweden) A Högström	21	21
7	(Netherlands) R Tabeling (Netherlands) C Seinen	15	22	6
Q4	(India) S Rankireddy (India) A Ponnappa	21	20	21
(Switzerland) O Schaller (Switzerland) C Burkart	17	15
(Denmark) K Knudsen (Denmark) I Nielsen	21	21

Second round
PFQ	(Germany) J R Jansen (Germany) E Janssens	11	21	18
(Republic of Ireland) S Evans (Sweden) A Högström	21	17	21
Q4	(India) S Rankireddy (India) A Ponnappa	21	21
(Denmark) K Knudsen (Denmark) I Nielsen	12	18

Quarterfinals
(Republic of Ireland) S Evans (Sweden) A Högström	18	14
Q4	(India) S Rankireddy (India) A Ponnappa	21	21

==== Section 2 ====
First round
3	(Republic of Ireland) S Magee (Republic of Ireland) C Magee	21	16	14
(Russia) A Parakhodin (Russia) N Rogova	14	21	21
(Germany) A Heinz (Germany) A Horbach	15	18
(Denmark) M Mikkelsen (Denmark) M Surrow	21	21
8	(England) M Ellis (England) L Smith	21	21
(Russia) V Durkin (Russia) N Vislova	10	8
(England) G Mairs (England) J Moore	22	15	21
(France) B Kersaudy (France) L Palermo	20	21	19

Second round
(Russia) A Parakhodin (Russia) N Rogova	14	10
(Denmark) M Mikkelsen (Denmark) M Surrow	21	21
8	(England) M Ellis (England) L Smith	21	21
(England) G Mairs (England) J Moore	16	18

Quarterfinals
(Denmark) M Mikkelsen (Denmark) M Surrow	15	8
8	(England) M Ellis (England) L Smith	21	21

=== Bottom half ===
==== Section 3 ====
First round
(Russia) E Dremin (Russia) O Arkhangelskaya	17	18
(England) M Clare (England) V Williams	21	21
(Netherlands) J Maas (Netherlands) I van der Aar	21	21
5	(Malaysia) Chan P S (Malaysia) Cheah Y S	13	15
(France) J Maio (France) D Delrue	21	21
(Ukraine) A Pochtarov (Ukraine) N Voytsekh	6	14
PFQ	(Netherlands) T van der Lecq (Netherlands) M Lugters	9	10
4	(England) B Lane (England) J Pugh	21	21

Second round
(England) M Clare (England) V Williams	12	13
(Netherlands) J Maas (Netherlands) I van der Aar	21	21
(France) J Maio (France) D Delrue	11	21	15
4	(England) B Lane (England) J Pugh	21	14	21

Quarterfinals
(Netherlands) J Maas (Netherlands) I van der Aar	16	17
4	(England) B Lane (England) J Pugh	21	21

==== Section 4 ====
First round
Q3	(India) M Attri (India) K. Maneesha	21	21	21
Q1	(Belgium) F Golinski (Belgium) L Jaques	18	23	14
(Finland) A Kaisti (Finland) J Nyström	21	20	20
6	(Netherlands) J Arends (Netherlands) S Piek	16	22	22
PFQ	(Germany) J Pistorius (Germany) L Käpplein	11	11
(Netherlands) R Jille (France) É Lefel	21	21
Q2	(England) S Vendy (England) S Walker	20	13
2	(France) R Labar (France) A Fontaine	22	21

Second round
Q3	(India) M Attri (India) K. Maneesha	13	14
6	(Netherlands) J Arends (Netherlands) S Piek	21	21
(Netherlands) R Jille (France) É Lefel	21	21
2	(France) R Labar (France) A Fontaine	14	18

Quarterfinals
6	(Netherlands) J Arends (Netherlands) S Piek	21	15	21
(Netherlands) R Jille (France) É Lefel	17	21	13

Preceded by 2017 Vietnam Open Grand Prix	BWF Grand Prix Gold and Grand Prix; 2017 BWF Season	Succeeded by 2017 Bitburger Open Grand Prix Gold
