= Yu Igarashi =

Japanese badminton player (born 1995)

Personal information
- Born: 15 May 1995 (age 31) Yamagata Prefecture, Japan
- Height: 171 cm (5 ft 7 in)
- Spouse: Arisa Higashino (m. 2024)

Sport
- Country: Japan
- Sport: Badminton
- Handedness: Right
- Coached by: Takuma Ueda
- Retired: 1 April 2024

Men's singles
- Career record: 98 wins, 54 losses
- Highest ranking: 36 (20 September 2018)
- BWF profile
Medal record
Men's badminton
Representing Japan
Sudirman Cup
Bronze medal – third place	2017 Gold Coast	Mixed team
Summer Universiade
Silver medal – second place	2017 Taipei	Mixed team
Bronze medal – third place	2017 Taipei	Men's singles
Asian Junior Championships
Bronze medal – third place	2013 Kota Kinabalu	Mixed team

Yu Igarashi (五十嵐 優, Igarashi Yū; born 15 May 1995) is a Japanese badminton player. He won his first international title at the 2017 Osaka International tournament.

== Personal life ==
On 28 August 2024, he announced his marriage to national badminton player, Arisa Higashino.

== Achievements ==
=== Summer Universiade ===
Men's singles
Year	Venue	Opponent	Score	Result
2017	Taipei Gymnasium; Taipei, Taiwan	(Chinese Taipei) Wang Tzu-wei	21–23, 21–23	Bronze

=== BWF World Tour (1 runner-up) ===
The BWF World Tour, which was announced on 19 March 2017 and implemented in 2018, is a series of elite badminton tournaments sanctioned by the Badminton World Federation (BWF). The BWF World Tour is divided into levels of World Tour Finals, Super 1000, Super 750, Super 500, Super 300, and the BWF Tour Super 100.

Men's singles
Year	Tournament	Level	Opponent	Score	Result	Ref.
2019	Akita Masters	Super 100	(Indonesia) Firman Abdul Kholik	18–21, 20–22	(silver) Runner-up	

=== BWF Grand Prix (1 runner-up) ===
The BWF Grand Prix has two levels, the BWF Grand Prix and Grand Prix Gold. It is a series of badminton tournaments sanctioned by the Badminton World Federation (BWF) since 2007.

Men's singles
Year	Tournament	Opponent	Score	Result	Ref.
2017	Dutch Open	(Japan) Kento Momota	10–21, 12–21	(silver) Runner-up	

BWF Grand Prix tournament

=== BWF International Challenge/Series (4 titles, 1 runner-up) ===
Men's singles
Year	Tournament	Opponent	Score	Result	Ref.
2017	Osaka International	(Chinese Taipei) Hsueh Hsuan-yi	25–23, 21–14	(gold) Winner	
2017	Finnish Open	(Denmark) Rasmus Gemke	17–21, 18–21	(silver) Runner-up	
2017	Spanish International	(Spain) Luis Enrique Peñalver	21–13, 21–14	(gold) Winner	
2018	Osaka International	(Japan) Kodai Naraoka	14–21, 21–11, 21–12	(gold) Winner	
2018	South Australia International	(Singapore) Loh Kean Yew	21–19, 22–24, 21–11	(gold) Winner	

BWF International Challenge tournament
