= Andrey Parakhodin =

Russian badminton player (born 1990)

Andrey Parakhodin Андрей Параходин
Personal information
- Born: Andrey Vladimirovich Parakhodin (Андрей Владимирович Параходин); 29 July 1990 (age 36) Kaluga, Russian SFSR, Soviet Union
- Height: 1.76 m (5 ft 9 in)
- Weight: 75 kg (165 lb)

Sport
- Country: Russia
- Sport: Badminton

Men's singles & doubles
- Highest ranking: 282 (MS 27 June 2013); 152 (MD 2 February 2018); 74 (XD 17 September 2015)
- BWF profile

Andrey Vladimirovich Parakhodin (Russian: Андрей Владимирович Параходин; born 29 July 1990) is a Russian badminton player. He was born in Kaluga, and now live in Nizhny Novgorod. Parakhodin was the runner-up at the 2016 National Championships in the mixed doubles event, and also became the men's doubles semifinalist in 2017.

He educated at the Moscow State Forest University, and competed at the 2013 Summer Universiade in Kazan, Russia.

== Achievements ==
=== BWF International Challenge/Series ===
Men's doubles
Year	Tournament	Partner	Opponent	Score	Result
2018	Estonian International	(Russia) Nikolai Ukk	(Germany) Peter Käsbauer (Germany) Johannes Pistorius	14–21, 21–18, 21–19	(gold) Winner
2018	Dutch International	(Russia) Nikita Khakimov	(India) Arun George (India) Sanyam Shukla	19–21, 19–21	(silver) Runner-up

Mixed doubles
Year	Tournament	Partner	Opponent	Score	Result
2015	Riga International	(Russia) Anastasia Chervyakova	(Denmark) Mads Emil Christensen (Denmark) Cecilie Sentow	21–18, 21–17	(gold) Winner
2015	Lithuanian International	(Russia) Anastasia Chervyakova	(Denmark) Søren Toft Hansen (France) Teshana Vignes Waran	14–21, 17–21	(silver) Runner-up

BWF International Challenge tournament
BWF International Series tournament
BWF Future Series tournament
