= Jacco Arends =

Dutch badminton player

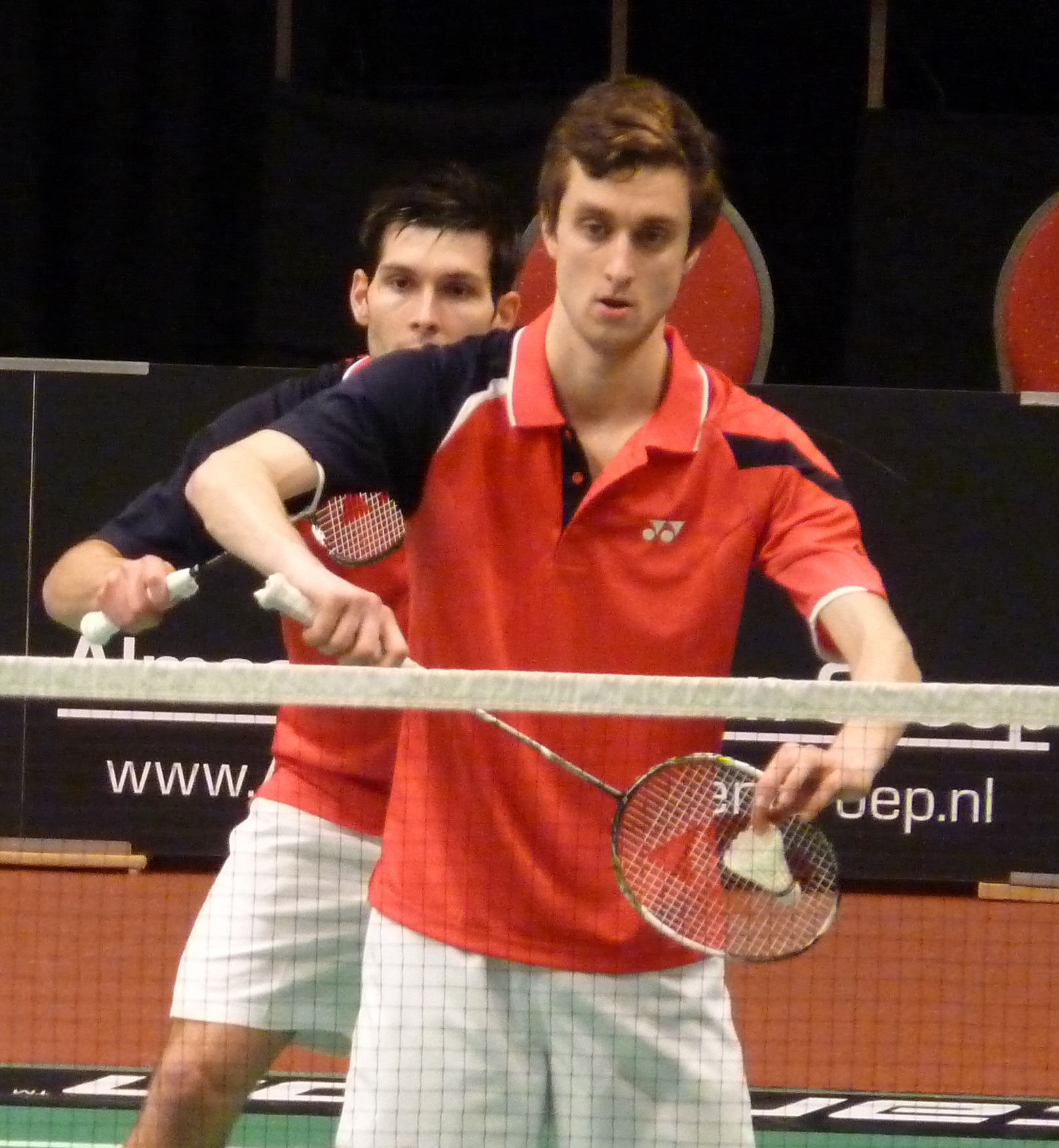

Personal information
- Born: 28 January 1991 (age 35) Haarlem, Netherlands
- Height: 1.86 m (6 ft 1 in)

Sport
- Country: Netherlands
- Sport: Badminton
- Handedness: Right

Men's & mixed doubles
- Highest ranking: 33 (MD with Jelle Maas 9 January 2014); 12 (XD with Selena Piek 26 November 2015)
- BWF profile
Medal record
Men's badminton
Representing Netherlands
European Championships
Bronze medal – third place	2016 La Roche-sur-Yon	Mixed doubles
European Mixed Team Championships
Bronze medal – third place	2019 Copenhagen	Mixed team
European Men's Team Championships
Silver medal – second place	2020 Liévin	Men's team
European Junior Championships
Gold medal – first place	2009 Milan	Mixed doubles
Silver medal – second place	2007 Völklingen	Mixed team
Silver medal – second place	2009 Milan	Mixed team

Jacco Arends (born 28 January 1991) is a Dutch retired badminton player who specializes in doubles. Arends began playing badminton at his hometown club BC Duinwijck, and in 2009, he won European Junior Championships in mixed doubles with Selena Piek. He was the bronze medalist at the 2016 European Championships, and at the same year, he competed at the 2016 Summer Olympics held in Rio de Janeiro, Brazil.

== Career ==
Jacco started when he was six years old at his club Duinwijck in Haarlem. He was a junior European badminton champion in mixed doubles in 2009 with Selena Piek. They won the Scottish Open BWF Grand Prix mixed doubles event in 2017. Jacco has also won international tournaments in Slovak, Sweden, Spain and Belgium in Men's doubles and in Slovak, Hungary, Estonia, Ireland, Belgium, Sweden and Scotland in Mixed doubles. He has won seven Dutch National titles. Four in Men's doubles with Jelle Maas in 2012, 2014, 2015 and 2016, and he also won three National titles in Mixed doubles with Selena Piek in 2014 - 2016. After his retirement he became a coach of the Eredivisie team at his club Duinwijck.

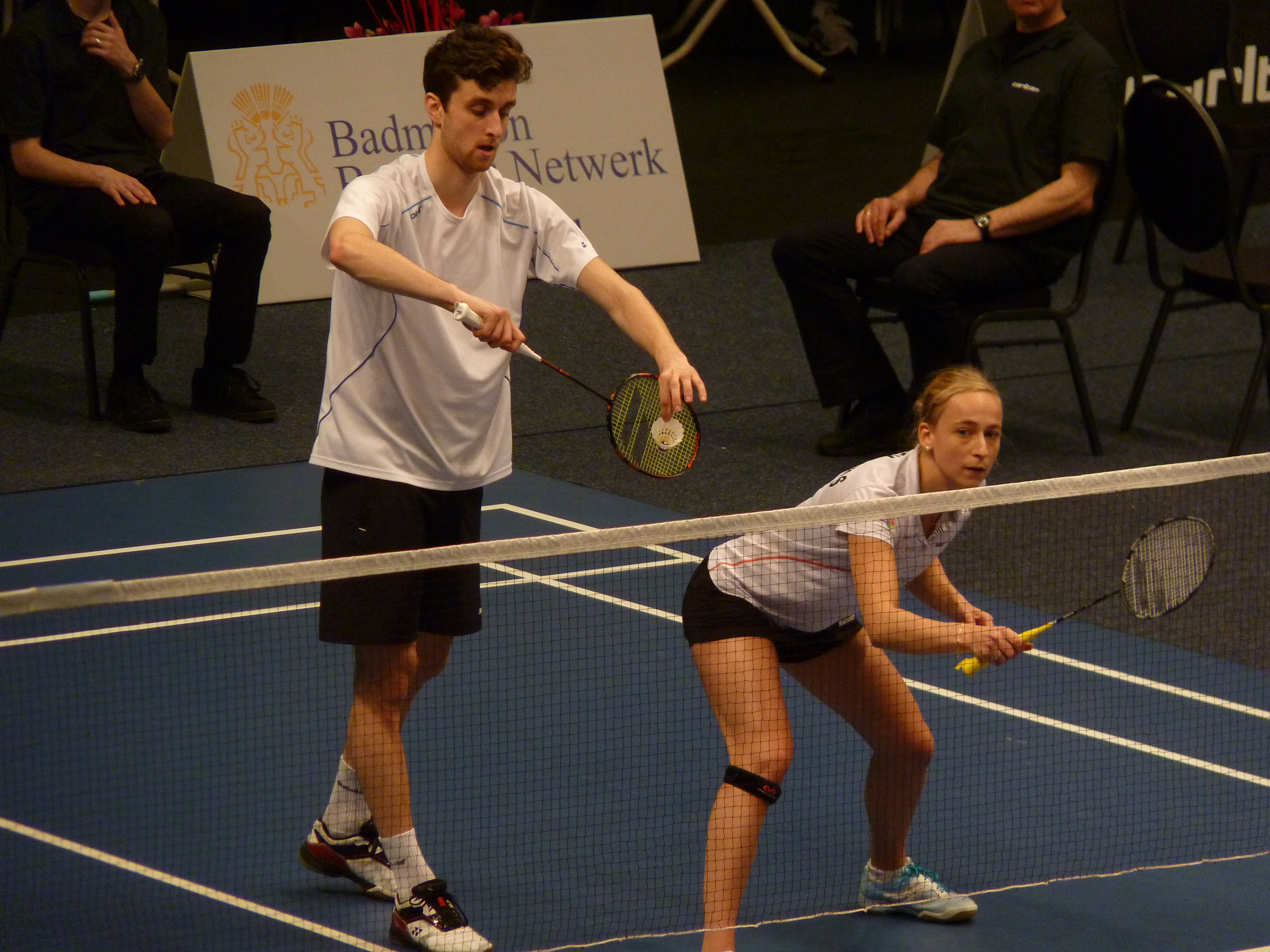
Jacco Arends and Selena Piek in action

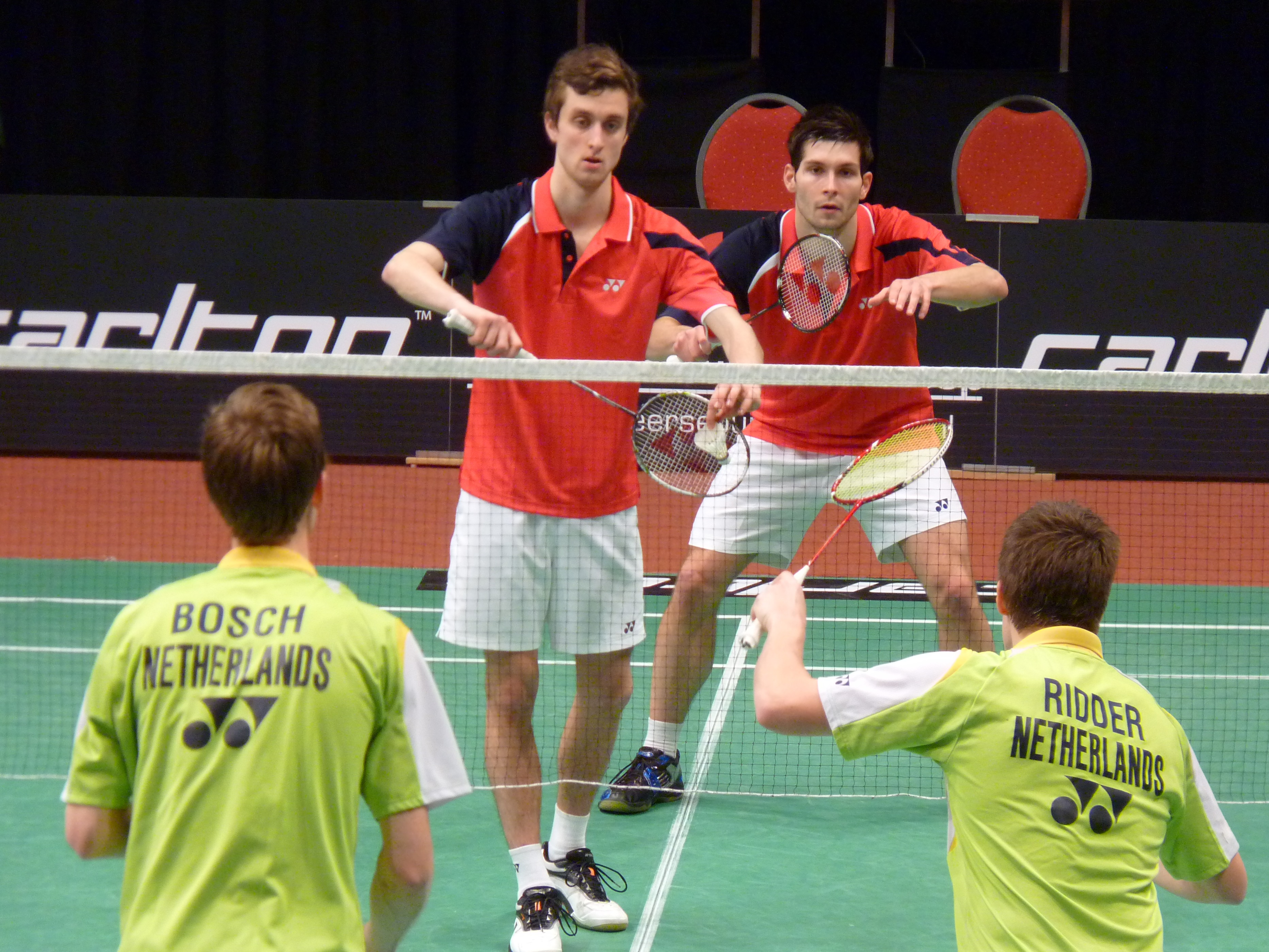
Jacco Arends and Jelle Maas in action

== Achievements ==
=== European Championships ===
Mixed doubles
Year	Venue	Partner	Opponent	Score	Result
2016	Vendéspace; La Roche-sur-Yon, France	(Netherlands) Selena Piek	(Denmark) Joachim Fischer Nielsen (Denmark) Christinna Pedersen	17–21, 8–21	Bronze

=== European Junior Championships ===
Mixed doubles
Year	Venue	Partner	Opponent	Score	Result
2009	Federal Technical Centre - Palabadminton; Milan, Italy	(Netherlands) Selena Piek	(Germany) Jonas Geigenberger (Germany) Fabienne Deprez	21–16, 20–22, 21–19	Gold

=== BWF World Tour ===
The BWF World Tour, which was announced on 19 March 2017 and implemented in 2018, is a series of elite badminton tournaments sanctioned by the Badminton World Federation (BWF). The BWF World Tour is divided into levels of World Tour Finals, Super 1000, Super 750, Super 500, Super 300, and the BWF Tour Super 100.

Mixed doubles
Year	Tournament	Level	Partner	Opponent	Score	Result
2018	Scottish Open	Super 100	(Netherlands) Selena Piek	(England) Marcus Ellis (England) Lauren Smith	6–13 retired	(silver) Runner-up

=== BWF Grand Prix ===
The BWF Grand Prix had two levels, the Grand Prix and Grand Prix Gold. It was a series of badminton tournaments sanctioned by the Badminton World Federation (BWF) and played between 2007 and 2017.

Men's doubles
Year	Tournament	Partner	Opponent	Score	Result
2017	Scottish Open	(Netherlands) Ruben Jille	(Netherlands) Jelle Maas (Netherlands) Robin Tabeling	11–21, 15–21	(silver) Runner-up

Mixed doubles
Year	Tournament	Partner	Opponent	Score	Result
2017	Dutch Open	(Netherlands) Selena Piek	(England) Marcus Ellis (England) Lauren Smith	17–21, 18–21	(silver) Runner-up
2017	Scottish Open	(Netherlands) Selena Piek	(Denmark) Mikkel Mikkelsen (Denmark) Mai Surrow	21–10, 21–10	(gold) Winner

BWF Grand Prix Gold tournament
BWF Grand Prix tournament

=== BWF International Challenge/Series ===
Men's doubles
Year	Tournament	Partner	Opponent	Score	Result
2010	Slovak Open	(Netherlands) Jelle Maas	(Germany) Maurice Niesner (Germany) Till Zander	21–18, 19–21, 21–15	(gold) Winner
2012	Norwegian International	(Netherlands) Jelle Maas	(Netherlands) Ruud Bosch (Netherlands) Koen Ridder	18–21, 22–20, 17–21	(silver) Runner-up
2013	Swedish Masters	(Netherlands) Jelle Maas	(Netherlands) Ruud Bosch (Netherlands) Koen Ridder	16–21, 21–16, 21–13	(gold) Winner
2013	Irish Open	(Netherlands) Jelle Maas	(Poland) Adam Cwalina (Poland) Przemysław Wacha	9–21, 6–21	(silver) Runner-up
2014	Belgian International	(Netherlands) Jelle Maas	(Denmark) Mathias Christiansen (Denmark) David Daugaard	10–11, 11–6, 11–8, 7–11, 9–11	(silver) Runner-up
2017	Spanish International	(Netherlands) Ruben Jille	(Japan) Keiichiro Matsui (Japan) Yoshinori Takeuchi	21–17, 21–19	(gold) Winner
2018	Belgian International	(Netherlands) Ruben Jille	(Denmark) David Daugaard (Denmark) Frederik Søgaard	11–21, 21–18, 21–17	(gold) Winner

Mixed doubles
Year	Tournament	Partner	Opponent	Score	Result
2010	Portugal International	(Netherlands) Selena Piek	(Croatia) Zvonimir Đurkinjak (Croatia) Staša Poznanović	14–21, 21–18, 11–21	(silver) Runner-up
2010	Slovak Open	(Netherlands) Selena Piek	(Belarus) Aleksei Konakh (Belarus) Alesia Zaitsava	21–15, 21–14	(gold) Winner
2010	Hungarian International	(Netherlands) Selena Piek	(Germany) Peter Käsbauer (Germany) Johanna Goliszewski	21–15, 21–14	(gold) Winner
2011	Estonian International	(Netherlands) Selena Piek	(Germany) Tim Dettmann (Netherlands) Ilse Vaessen	21–12, 21–14	(gold) Winner
2013	Belgian International	(Netherlands) Selena Piek	(Denmark) Anders Skaarup Rasmussen (Denmark) Lena Grebak	18–21, 21–9, 15–21	(silver) Runner-up
2013	Irish Open	(Netherlands) Selena Piek	(Scotland) Robert Blair (Scotland) Imogen Bankier	9–21, 21–19, 21–13	(gold) Winner
2013	Italian International	(Netherlands) Selena Piek	(Croatia) Zvonimir Đurkinjak (United States) Eva Lee	21–23, 18–21	(silver) Runner-up
2014	Belgian International	(Netherlands) Selena Piek	(Netherlands) Jelle Maas (Netherlands) Iris Tabeling	11–5, 11–10, 11–7	(gold) Winner
2015	Swedish Masters	(Netherlands) Selena Piek	(Russia) Vitalij Durkin (Russia) Nina Vislova	21–17, 17–21, 21–14	(gold) Winner
2017	Belgian International	(Netherlands) Selena Piek	(Republic of Ireland) Scott Evans (Sweden) Amanda Högström	21–17, 21–9	(gold) Winner
2018	Belgian International	(Netherlands) Selena Piek	(Scotland) Adam Hall (Scotland) Julie MacPherson	21–11, 21–13	(gold) Winner
2019	Brazil International	(Netherlands) Cheryl Seinen	(Netherlands) Robin Tabeling (Netherlands) Selena Piek	21–16, 21–23, 17–21	(silver) Runner-up

BWF International Challenge tournament
BWF International Series tournament
BWF Future Series tournament
