= Rasmus Gemke =

Danish badminton player (born 1997)

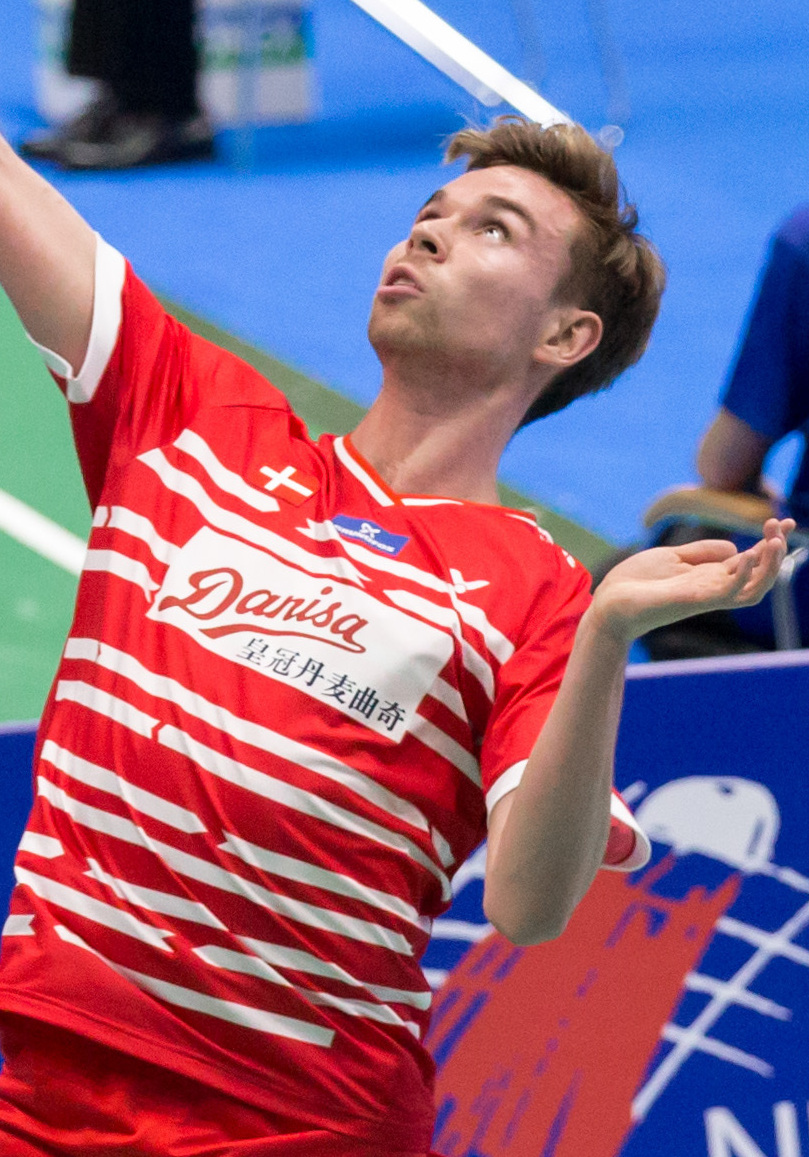
- Gemke at the 2018 European Men's Team Championships

Personal information
- Born: 11 January 1997 (age 29) Viby J, Denmark

Sport
- Country: Denmark
- Sport: Badminton
- Handedness: Right

Men's singles
- Highest ranking: 10 (30 November 2021)
- Current ranking: 23 (27 October 2026)
- BWF profile
Medal record
Men's badminton
Representing Denmark
Thomas Cup
Bronze medal – third place	2020 Aarhus	Men's team
Bronze medal – third place	2022 Bangkok	Men's team
European Mixed Team Championships
Gold medal – first place	2019 Copenhagen	Mixed team
Gold medal – first place	2021 Vantaa	Mixed team
Gold medal – first place	2025 Baku	Mixed team
European Men's Team Championships
Gold medal – first place	2018 Kazan	Men's team
Gold medal – first place	2024 Łódź	Men's team
Silver medal – second place	2026 Istanbul	Men's team
European Junior Championships
Bronze medal – third place	2015 Lubin	Mixed team

Rasmus Gemke (born 11 January 1997) is a Danish badminton player. He was awarded the 2012 Badminton Denmark Comet of the Year. He was part of the Danish national U-19 team to win bronze at the 2015 European Junior Badminton Championships in Lubin, Poland. He made his senior international debut at the 2016 Belgian International tournament.

== Achievements ==
=== BWF World Tour (1 title, 4 runners-up) ===
The BWF World Tour, which was announced on 19 March 2017 and implemented in 2018, is a series of elite badminton tournaments sanctioned by the Badminton World Federation (BWF). The BWF World Tour is divided into levels of World Tour Finals, Super 1000, Super 750, Super 500, Super 300 (part of the HSBC World Tour), and the BWF Tour Super 100.

Men's singles
Year	Tournament	Level	Opponent	Score	Result
2018	Orléans Masters	Super 100	(Netherlands) Mark Caljouw	21–10, 18–21, 8–21	(silver) Runner-up
2018	Spain Masters	Super 300	(Thailand) Suppanyu Avihingsanon	15–21, 21–6, 21–14	(gold) Winner
2020	Denmark Open	Super 750	(Denmark) Anders Antonsen	21–18, 19–21, 12–21	(silver) Runner-up
2022	French Open	Super 750	(Denmark) Viktor Axelsen	14–21, 15–21	(silver) Runner-up
2024	German Open	Super 300	(France) Christo Popov	17–21, 16–21	(silver) Runner-up

=== BWF Grand Prix (1 title) ===
The BWF Grand Prix had two levels, the Grand Prix and Grand Prix Gold. It was a series of badminton tournaments sanctioned by the Badminton World Federation (BWF) and played between 2007 and 2017.

Men's singles
Year	Tournament	Opponent	Score	Result
2017	Bitburger Open	(Chinese Taipei) Hsu Jen-hao	21–18, 21–10	(gold) Winner

BWF Grand Prix Gold tournament
BWF Grand Prix tournament

=== BWF International Challenge/Series (2 titles) ===
Men's singles
Year	Tournament	Opponent	Score	Result
2017	Finnish Open	(Japan) Yu Igarashi	21–17, 21–18	(gold) Winner
2019	Azerbaijan International	(Sweden) Felix Burestedt	21–13, 21–12	(gold) Winner

BWF International Challenge tournament
BWF International Series tournament
BWF Future Series tournament
