= Peter Briggs (badminton) =

Personal information
- Born: 23 February 1992 (age 34) Leicester, England
- Years active: 2008
- Height: 1.93 m (6 ft 4 in)

Sport
- Country: England (2008–2019); Canada (2019–now)
- Sport: Badminton
- Handedness: Right
- Coached by: Jakob Hoi; Mike Adams

Men's doubles
- Highest ranking: 24 (28 September 2017)
- BWF profile
Medal record
Men's badminton
Representing England
European Men's Team Championships
Silver medal – second place	2018 Kazan	Men's team
Bronze medal – third place	2016 Kazan	Men's team

Peter Briggs (born 23 February 1992) is a badminton player from England. In 2019, he started to represent Canada.

== Achievements ==
=== BWF Grand Prix (1 title) ===
The BWF Grand Prix has two levels, the BWF Grand Prix and Grand Prix Gold. It is a series of badminton tournaments sanctioned by the Badminton World Federation (BWF) since 2007.

Men's doubles
Year	Tournament	Partner	Opponent	Score	Result
2017	Canada Open	(England) Tom Wolfenden	(South Korea) Kim Won-ho (South Korea) Seo Seung-jae	22–20, 16–21, 21–19	(gold) Winner

BWF Grand Prix Gold tournament
BWF Grand Prix tournament

=== BWF International Challenge/Series (3 titles, 9 runners-up) ===
Men's doubles
Year	Tournament	Partner	Opponent	Score	Result
2012	Czech International	(England) Harley Towler	(England) Chris Langridge (England) Peter Mills	14–21, 16–21	(silver) Runner-up
2012	Welsh International	(England) Harley Towler	(England) Marcus Ellis (Scotland) Paul van Rietvelde	21–16, 9–21, 16–21	(silver) Runner-up
2013	Portugal International	(England) Harley Towler	(Denmark) Kim Astrup (Denmark) Anders Skaarup Rasmussen	18–21, 14–21	(silver) Runner-up
2015	Austrian International	(England) Tom Wolfenden	(Indonesia) Fajar Alfian (Indonesia) Muhammad Rian Ardianto	21–23, 21–18, 19–21	(silver) Runner-up
2015	Portugal International	(England) Tom Wolfenden	(Scotland) Martin Campbell (Scotland) Patrick MacHugh	21–17, 22–20	(gold) Winner
2015	Croatian International	(England) Tom Wolfenden	(Malaysia) Lim Ming Chuen (Malaysia) Ong Wei Khoon	21–19, 21–10	(gold) Winner
2015	Swiss International	(England) Tom Wolfenden	(Malaysia) Koo Kien Keat (Malaysia) Tan Boon Heong	21–18, 16–21, 16–21	(silver) Runner-up
2017	Belgian International	(England) Tom Wolfenden	(Denmark) Frederik Colberg (Denmark) Rasmus Fladberg	21–16, 13–21, 6–21	(silver) Runner-up
2018	Turkey International	(England) Gregory Mairs	(Indonesia) Leo Rolly Carnando (Indonesia) Daniel Marthin	14–21, 21–14, 21–23	(silver) Runner-up
2019	Estonian International	(England) Gregory Mairs	(Singapore) Danny Bawa Chrisnanta (Singapore) Loh Kean Hean	22–20, 21–18	(gold) Winner
2019	Hungarian International	(Canada) Joshua Hurlburt-Yu	(South Korea) Kim Duk-young (South Korea) Kim Sa-rang	12–21, 17–21	(silver) Runner-up

Mixed doubles
Year	Tournament	Partner	Opponent	Score	Result
2011	Welsh International	(Malaysia) Ng Hui Ern	(Scotland) Martin Campbell (Malaysia) Ng Hui Lin	16–21, 19–21	(silver) Runner-up

BWF International Challenge tournament
BWF International Series tournament
BWF Future Series tournament
