= Jelle Maas =

Dutch retired badminton player (born 1991)

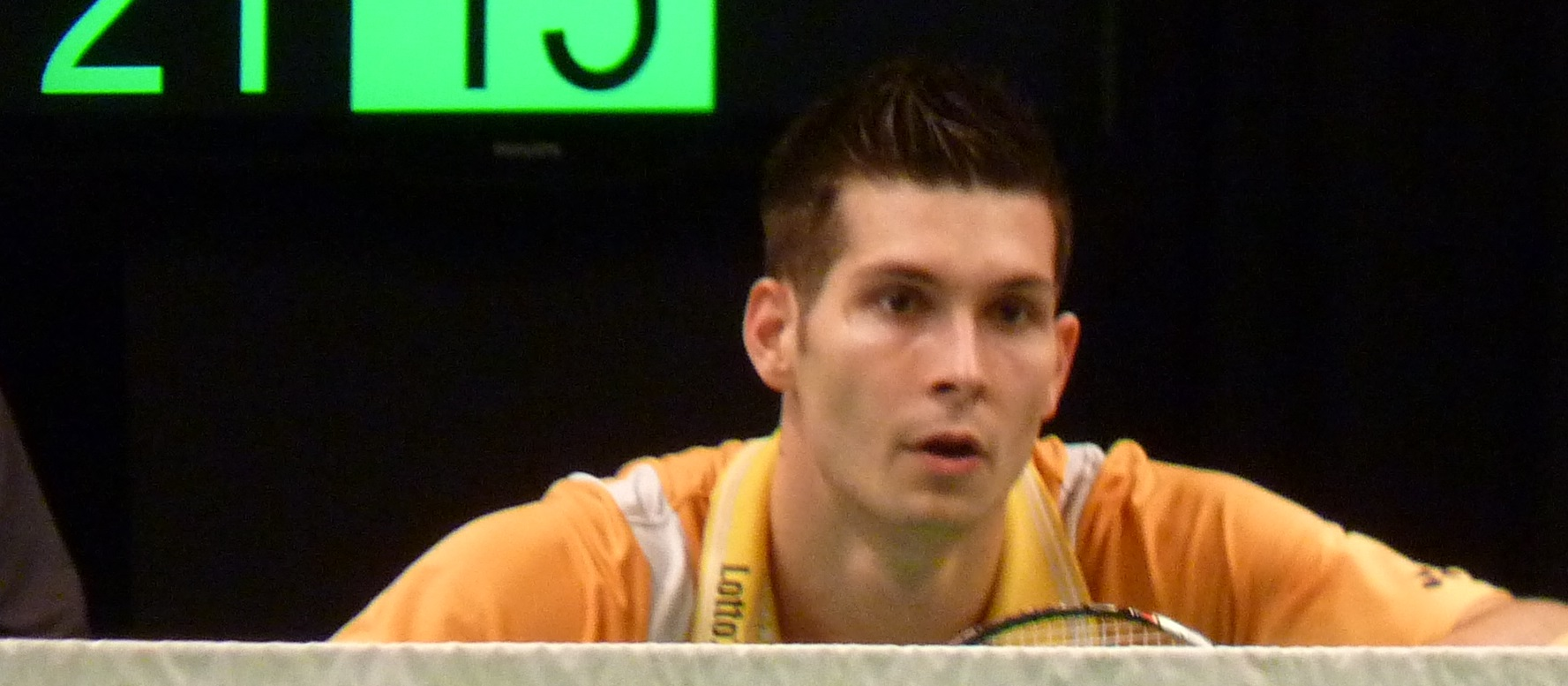

Personal information
- Born: 19 February 1991 (age 35) Oosterhout, Netherlands
- Height: 1.83 m (6 ft 0 in)
- Weight: 80 kg (176 lb)

Sport
- Country: Netherlands
- Sport: Badminton
- Handedness: Right
- Coached by: Ruud Bosch
- Retired: 22 July 2020

Men's & mixed doubles
- Highest ranking: 26 (MD with Robin Tabeling 27 September 2018); 44 (XD 31 October 2013)
- BWF profile
Medal record
Men's badminton
Representing Netherlands
European Games
Bronze medal – third place	2019 Minsk	Men's doubles
European Championships
Bronze medal – third place	2018 Huelva	Men's doubles
European Mixed Team Championships
Bronze medal – third place	2019 Copenhagen	Mixed team
European Men's Team Championships
Silver medal – second place	2020 Liévin	Men's team
European Junior Championships
Silver medal – second place	2007 Völklingen	Mixed team
Silver medal – second place	2009 Milan	Mixed team

Jelle Maas (born 19 February 1991) is a Dutch retired badminton player specializing in doubles events. He was the bronze medalists at the 2018 European Championships and 2019 European Games.

He won a total of seven Dutch National Badminton Championships in the Men's doubles event, four with Jacco Arends in 2012, 2014, 2015 and 2016 and three with Robin Tabeling in 2017, 2018 and 2019. Badminton Nederland announced his retirement from the international tours on 22 July 2020, and officially left the national training center on 1 September 2020.

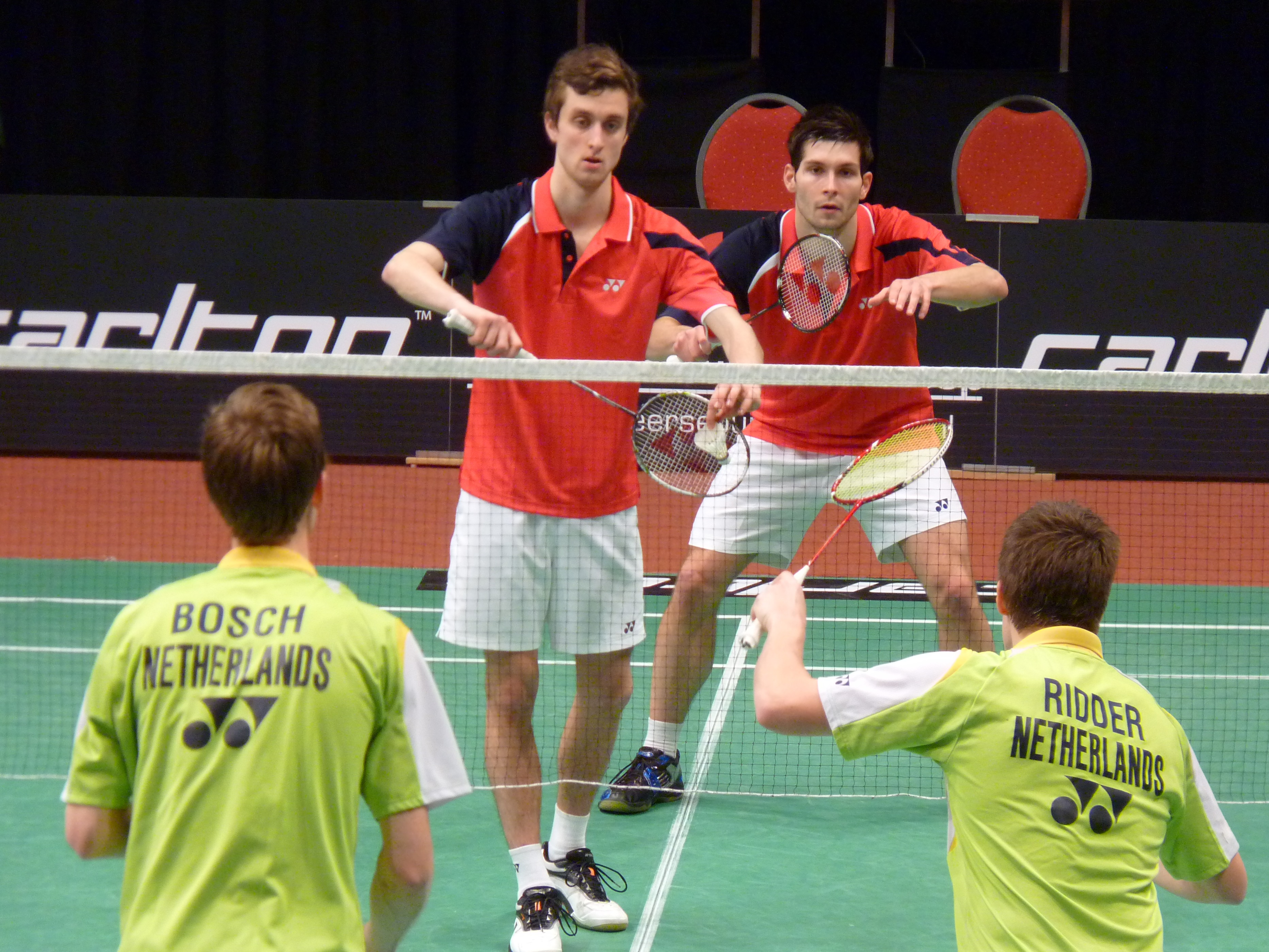
Jacco Arends and Jelle Maas in action

== Achievements ==
=== European Games ===
Men's doubles
Year	Venue	Partner	Opponent	Score	Result
2019	Falcon Club; Minsk, Belarus	(Netherlands) Robin Tabeling	(United Kingdom) Marcus Ellis (United Kingdom) Chris Langridge	18–21, 16–21	Bronze

=== European Championships ===
Men's doubles
Year	Venue	Partner	Opponent	Score	Result
2018	Palacio de los Deportes Carolina Marín; Huelva, Spain	(Netherlands) Robin Tabeling	(Denmark) Kim Astrup (Denmark) Anders Skaarup Rasmussen	15–21, 18–21	Bronze

=== BWF World Tour ===
The BWF World Tour, which was announced on 19 March 2017 and implemented in 2018, is a series of elite badminton tournaments sanctioned by the Badminton World Federation (BWF). The BWF World Tour is divided into levels of World Tour Finals, Super 1000, Super 750, Super 500, Super 300, and the BWF Tour Super 100.

Men's doubles
Year	Tournament	Level	Partner	Opponent	Score	Result
2018	Dutch Open	Super 100	(Netherlands) Robin Tabeling	(Indonesia) Wahyu Nayaka (Indonesia) Ade Yusuf Santoso	19–21, 21–17, 11–21	(silver) Runner-up

=== BWF Grand Prix ===
The BWF Grand Prix had two levels, the Grand Prix and Grand Prix Gold. It was a series of badminton tournaments sanctioned by the Badminton World Federation (BWF) and played between 2007 and 2017.

Men's doubles
Year	Tournament	Partner	Opponent	Score	Result
2017	Scottish Open	(Netherlands) Robin Tabeling	(Netherlands) Jacco Arends (Netherlands) Ruben Jille	21–11, 21–15	(gold) Winner

BWF Grand Prix Gold tournament
BWF Grand Prix tournament

=== BWF International Challenge/Series ===
Men's doubles
Year	Tournament	Partner	Opponent	Score	Result
2010	Slovak Open	(Netherlands) Jacco Arends	(Germany) Maurice Niesner (Germany) Till Zander	21–18, 19–21, 21–15	(gold) Winner
2012	Norwegian International	(Netherlands) Jacco Arends	(Netherlands) Ruud Bosch (Netherlands) Koen Ridder	18–21, 22–20, 17–21	(silver) Runner-up
2013	Irish Open	(Netherlands) Jacco Arends	(Poland) Adam Cwalina (Poland) Przemysław Wacha	9–21, 6–21	(silver) Runner-up
2013	Swedish Masters	(Netherlands) Jacco Arends	(Netherlands) Ruud Bosch (Netherlands) Koen Ridder	16–21, 21–16, 21–13	(gold) Winner
2014	Belgian International	(Netherlands) Jacco Arends	(Denmark) Mathias Christiansen (Denmark) David Daugaard	10–11, 11–6, 11–8, 7–11, 9–11	(silver) Runner-up
2017	Italian International	(Netherlands) Robin Tabeling	(Poland) Miłosz Bochat (Poland) Adam Cwalina	23–21, 21–18	(gold) Winner
2019	Brazil International	(Netherlands) Robin Tabeling	(India) Satwiksairaj Rankireddy (India) Chirag Shetty	14–21, 18–21	(silver) Runner-up

Mixed doubles
Year	Tournament	Partner	Opponent	Score	Result
2010	Czech International	(Netherlands) Iris Tabeling	(Denmark) Anders Skaarup Rasmussen (Denmark) Anne Skelbæk	16–21, 11–21	(silver) Runner-up
2013	Swedish Masters	(Netherlands) Iris Tabeling	(Germany) Peter Käsbauer (Germany) Isabel Herttrich	17–21, 14–21	(silver) Runner-up
2014	Belgian International	(Netherlands) Iris Tabeling	(Netherlands) Jacco Arends (Netherlands) Selena Piek	5–11, 10–11, 7–11	(silver) Runner-up

BWF International Challenge tournament
BWF International Series tournament
BWF Future Series tournament
