= 2018 Spain Masters =

2018 badminton tournament in Barcelona

Tournament details
- Dates: 28 August – 2 September
- Edition: 1st
- Level: Super 300
- Total prize money: US$150,000
- Venue: Pavelló de la Vall d'Hebron
- Location: Barcelona, Spain

Champions
- Men's singles: (Denmark) Rasmus Gemke
- Women's singles: (Japan) Minatsu Mitani
- Men's doubles: (South Korea) Kim Gi-jung (South Korea) Lee Yong-dae
- Women's doubles: (Japan) Mayu Matsumoto (Japan) Wakana Nagahara
- Mixed doubles: (Denmark) Niclas Nøhr (Denmark) Sara Thygesen

The 2018 Spain Masters (officially known as the Barcelona Spain Masters 2018) was a badminton tournament which took place at Pavelló de la Vall d'Hebron in Barcelona, Spain, from 28 August to 2 September 2018 and had a total prize of $150,000.

== Tournament ==
The 2018 Spain Masters was the fifteenth tournament of the 2018 BWF World Tour and also part of the Spain Masters championships, which was held for the first time. This tournament was organized by Spanish Badminton Federation, and sanctioned by the BWF.

=== Venue ===
This international tournament was held at Pavelló de la Vall d'Hebron in Barcelona, Spain.

=== Point distribution ===
Below is the point distribution table for each phase of the tournament based on the BWF points system for the BWF World Tour Super 300 event.

Winner	Runner-up	3/4	5/8	9/16	17/32	33/64	65/128
7,000	5,950	4,900	3,850	2,750	1,670	660	320

=== Prize money ===
The total prize money for this year's tournament was US$150,000. Distribution of prize money was in accordance with BWF regulations.

Event	Winner	Finals	Semi-finals	Quarter-finals	Last 16
Singles	$11,250	$5,700	$2,175	$900	$525
Doubles	$11,850	$5,700	$2,100	$1,087.50	$562.50

== Men's singles ==
=== Seeds ===
1. (Thailand) Suppanyu Avihingsanon (final)
2. (Denmark) Rasmus Gemke (champion)
3. (Netherlands) Mark Caljouw (first round)
4. (Denmark) Jan Ø. Jørgensen (quarter-finals)
5. (Japan) Yu Igarashi (semi-finals)
6. (Spain) Pablo Abián (first round)
7. (Israel) Misha Zilberman (quarter-finals)
8. (England) Toby Penty (semi-finals)

=== Finals ===
Semi-finals
1	(Thailand) Suppanyu Avihingsanon	21	21
5	(Japan) Yu Igarashi	11	15
8	(England) Toby Penty	19	17
2	(Denmark) Rasmus Gemke	21	21

Final
1	(Thailand) Suppanyu Avihingsanon	21	6	14
2	(Denmark) Rasmus Gemke	15	21	21

=== Top half ===
==== Section 1 ====
First Round
1	(Thailand) S Avihingsanon	21	21
PFQ	(Germany) L Schänzler	17	15
(France) T Rouxel	21	21
(Sweden) J Nilsson	19	12
7	(Israel) M Zilberman	22	16	21
(India) S Dey	20	21	19
Q4	(Denmark) R Messerschmidt	21	21
(Germany) A Roovers	13	17

Second Round
1	(Thailand) S Avihingsanon	21	21
(France) T Rouxel	19	16
7	(Israel) M Zilberman	19	21	21
Q4	(Denmark) R Messerschmidt	21	17	16

Quarter-finals
1	(Thailand) S Avihingsanon	21	21
7	(Israel) M Zilberman	16	14

==== Section 2 ====
First Round
4	(Denmark) J Ø. Jørgensen	21	21
(France) L Claerbout	15	10
Q2	(India) K R Rajarajan	11	12
Q3	(Japan) R Takeshita	21	21
5	(Japan) Y Igarashi	25	21
(Germany) K Schäfer	23	15
Q1	(Spain) A Vázquez	13	21
(France) T J Popov	21	23

Second Round
4	(Denmark) J Ø. Jørgensen	21	18	23
Q3	(Japan) R Takeshita	16	21	21
5	(Japan) Y Igarashi	21	21
(France) T J Popov	14	19

Quarter-finals
4	(Denmark) J Ø. Jørgensen	10	13
5	(Japan) Y Igarashi	21	21

=== Bottom half ===
==== Section 3 ====
First Round
(Finland) H Aarnio	21	9	21
(Denmark) K Bruun	15	21	17
(Czech Republic) A Mendrek	15	12
8	(England) T Penty	21	21
(Sweden) F Burestedt	16	15
(Finland) K Koljonen	21	21
(Denmark) V Svendsen	21	21
3	(Netherlands) M Caljouw	13	18

Second Round
(Finland) H Aarnio	12	21	15
8	(England) T Penty	21	17	21
(Finland) K Koljonen	16	22	10
(Denmark) V Svendsen	21	20	21

Quarter-finals
8	(England) T Penty	21	21
(Denmark) V Svendsen	12	11

==== Section 4 ====
First Round
(Italy) R Maddaloni	21	5	9
(Russia) V Malkov	11	21	21
(India) A Jayaram	15	21	21
6	(Spain) P Abián	21	17	8
PFQ	(Spain) L E Peñalver	21	18	21
(Estonia) R Must	9	21	16
(Hungary) G Krausz	13	12
2	(Denmark) R Gemke	21	21

Second Round
(Russia) V Malkov	11	10
(India) A Jayaram	21	21
PFQ	(Spain) L E Peñalver	7	16
2	(Denmark) R Gemke	21	21

Quarter-finals
(India) A Jayaram	21	13	11
2	(Denmark) R Gemke	13	21	21

== Women's singles ==
=== Seeds ===
1. (Spain) Carolina Marín (withdrew)
2. (Japan) Sayaka Takahashi (quarter-finals)
3. (Denmark) Mia Blichfeldt (final)
4. (Thailand) Pornpawee Chochuwong (first round)
5. (Thailand) Busanan Ongbamrungphan (quarter-finals)
6. (Scotland) Kirsty Gilmour (semi-finals)
7. (Denmark) Line Kjærsfeldt (semi-finals)
8. (Spain) Beatriz Corrales (quarter-finals)

=== Finals ===
Semi-finals
7	(Denmark) Line Kjærsfeldt	18	21	20
3	(Denmark) Mia Blichfeldt	21	19	22
(Japan) Minatsu Mitani	21	21
6	(Scotland) Kirsty Gilmour	15	16

Final
3	(Denmark) Mia Blichfeldt	21	21	8
(Japan) Minatsu Mitani	9	23	21

=== Top half ===
==== Section 1 ====
First Round
PFQ	(Spain) S Peñalver	18	23	21
Q3	(United States) L Lam	21	21	17
(Germany) Y Li	21	21
(England) C Birch	17	12
7	(Denmark) L Kjærsfeldt	21	21
(Germany) F Deprez	12	18
(Spain) C Azurmendi	18	21	21
Q1	(France) M Le Turdu	21	13	12

Second Round
PFQ	(Spain) S Peñalver	18	21	13
(Germany) Y Li	21	15	21
7	(Denmark) L Kjærsfeldt	21	21
(Spain) C Azurmendi	8	13

Quarter-finals
(Germany) Y Li	17	18
7	(Denmark) L Kjærsfeldt	21	21

==== Section 2 ====
First Round
3	(Denmark) M Blichfeldt	19	21	21
(Russia) N Perminova	21	7	15
(India) M Agrey	12	13
(Canada) B Tam	21	21
5	(Thailand) B Ongbamrungphan	21	21
(Mauritius) K Foo Kune	10	7
(Japan) A Mine	21	22
(Russia) E Kosetskaya	11	20

Second Round
3	(Denmark) M Blichfeldt	21	21
(Canada) B Tam	17	14
5	(Thailand) B Ongbamrungphan	17	21	21
(Japan) A Mine	21	12	16

Quarter-finals
3	(Denmark) M Blichfeldt	21	21
5	(Thailand) B Ongbamrungphan	18	17

=== Bottom half ===
==== Section 3 ====
First Round
Q4	(Netherlands) D Jille	19	21	13
(Bulgaria) L Zetchiri	21	18	21
(Germany) L Heim	13	15
8	(Spain) B Corrales	21	21
(India) A Prabhudesai	15	22	16
(China) Qi XF	21	20	21
(Japan) M Mitani	21	23
4	(Thailand) P Chochuwong	14	21

Second Round
(Bulgaria) L Zetchiri	15	14
8	(Spain) B Corrales	21	21
(China) Qi XF	9	18
(Japan) M Mitani	21	21

Quarter-finals
8	(Spain) B Corrales	17	15
(Japan) M Mitani	21	21

==== Section 4 ====
First Round
(United States) D Gupta	15	11
(Denmark) M Poulsen	21	21
(Czech Republic) K Tomalová	12	11
6	(Scotland) K Gilmour	21	21
PFQ	(Denmark) M Skødstrup	21	21
Q2	(Switzerland) R Stern	11	13
(Denmark) J D Jakobsen	14	17
2	(Japan) S Takahashi	21	21

Second Round
(Denmark) M Poulsen	15	21	14
6	(Scotland) K Gilmour	21	19	21
PFQ	(Denmark) M Skødstrup	4	10
2	(Japan) S Takahashi	21	21

Quarter-finals
6	(Scotland) K Gilmour	21	11	21
2	(Japan) S Takahashi	16	21	15

== Men's doubles ==
=== Seeds ===
1. (Denmark) Mathias Boe / Carsten Mogensen (withdrew)
2. (Denmark) Kim Astrup / Anders Skaarup Rasmussen (withdrew)
3. (Russia) Vladimir Ivanov / Ivan Sozonov (withdrew)
4. (Germany) Jones Ralfy Jansen / Josche Zurwonne (second round)

=== Finals ===
Semi-finals
(South Korea) Kim Gi-jung (South Korea) Lee Yong-dae	21	21
(Malaysia) Chen Tang Jie (Malaysia) Man Wei Chong	11	17
(Thailand) Bodin Isara (Thailand) Maneepong Jongjit	19	21	21
(Japan) Akira Koga (Japan) Taichi Saito	21	8	12

Final
(South Korea) Kim Gi-jung (South Korea) Lee Yong-dae	21	21
(Thailand) Bodin Isara (Thailand) Maneepong Jongjit	13	17

=== Top half ===
==== Section 1 ====
First Round
(France) M Briot (France) K Lovang	w	/	o
(England) P Briggs (England) T Wolfenden
(Scotland) A Dunn (Scotland) A Hall	23	13
(Denmark) K Antonsen (Denmark) N Nøhr	25	21
(Netherlands) J Maas (Netherlands) R Tabeling	17	14
(South Korea) Kim G-j (South Korea) Lee Y-d	21	21

Second Round
1	(Denmark) M Boe (Denmark) C Mogensen
(France) M Briot (France) K Lovang	w	/	o
(Denmark) K Antonsen (Denmark) N Nøhr	15	14
(South Korea) Kim G-j (South Korea) Lee Y-d	21	21

Quarter-finals
(France) M Briot (France) K Lovang	11	17
(South Korea) Kim G-j (South Korea) Lee Y-d	21	21

==== Section 2 ====
First Round
(Denmark) D Daugaard (Denmark) F Søgaard Mortensen	17	25
(Malaysia) Chen T J (Malaysia) Man W C	21	27
(Denmark) M Bay-Smidt (Denmark) L Mølhede	21	21
(Spain) B Amaya (Spain) M Gallardo	10	14
(Denmark) F Colberg (Denmark) J Fischer Nielsen	w	/	o
(Germany) B Geiss (Germany) J C Völker

Second Round
4	(Germany) J R Jansen (Germany) J Zurwonne	16	21	17
(Malaysia) Chen T J (Malaysia) Man W C	21	14	21
(Denmark) M Bay-Smidt (Denmark) L Mølhede	21	16	18
(Denmark) F Colberg (Denmark) J Fischer Nielsen	19	21	21

Quarter-finals
(Malaysia) Chen T J (Malaysia) Man W C	21	17	21
(Denmark) F Colberg (Denmark) J Fischer Nielsen	15	21	15

=== Bottom half ===
==== Section 3 ====
First Round
(Denmark) J Bay (Denmark) M Mikkelsen	21	24
(France) C Popov (France) T J Popov	17	22
(France) F Delrue (France) W Villeger	8	18
(Netherlands) J Arends (Netherlands) R Jille	21	21
(England) B Lane (England) S Vendy
(Russia) K Abramov (Russia) A Zinchenko	w	/	o
(Thailand) B Isara (Thailand) M Jongjit	w	/	o
3	(Russia) V Ivanov (Russia) I Sozonov

Second Round
(Denmark) J Bay (Denmark) M Mikkelsen	25	21
(Netherlands) J Arends (Netherlands) R Jille	23	18
(Russia) K Abramov (Russia) A Zinchenko	18	8
(Thailand) B Isara (Thailand) M Jongjit	21	21

Quarter-finals
(Denmark) J Bay (Denmark) M Mikkelsen	17	18
(Thailand) B Isara (Thailand) M Jongjit	21	21

==== Section 4 ====
First Round
(Malaysia) Shia C K (Malaysia) Tan W G	18	20
(Japan) A Koga (Japan) T Saito	21	22
(Malaysia) Goh S F (Malaysia) N Izzuddin Mohd Rumsani	21	21
(Spain) A Duran (Spain) G Duran	6	8
(India) Arjun M.R. (India) R Shlok
(Republic of Ireland) J Magee (Republic of Ireland) P Reynolds	w	/	o

Second Round
(Japan) A Koga (Japan) T Saito	19	21	21
(Malaysia) Goh S F (Malaysia) N Izzuddin Mohd Rumsani	21	18	12
(Republic of Ireland) J Magee (Republic of Ireland) P Reynolds	w	/	o
2	(Denmark) K Astrup (Denmark) A S Rasmussen

Quarter-finals
(Japan) A Koga (Japan) T Saito	21	22	21
(Republic of Ireland) J Magee (Republic of Ireland) P Reynolds	19	24	9

== Women's doubles ==
=== Seeds ===
1. (Japan) Mayu Matsumoto / Wakana Nagahara (champions)
2. (Japan) Ayako Sakuramoto / Yukiko Takahata (final)
3. (Denmark) Maiken Fruergaard / Sara Thygesen (semi-finals)
4. (Netherlands) Selena Piek / Cheryl Seinen (quarter-finals)

=== Finals ===
Semi-finals
1	(Japan) Mayu Matsumoto (Japan) Wakana Nagahara	17	21	21
3	(Denmark) Maiken Fruergaard (Denmark) Sara Thygesen	21	16	12
(Japan) Misato Aratama (Japan) Akane Watanabe	11	14
2	(Japan) Ayako Sakuramoto (Japan) Yukiko Takahata	21	21

Final
1	(Japan) Mayu Matsumoto (Japan) Wakana Nagahara	21	21
2	(Japan) Ayako Sakuramoto (Japan) Yukiko Takahata	17	13

=== Top half ===
==== Section 1 ====
First Round
(England) J Pugh (England) L Smith
(France) A Desmons (France) J Moinard	w	/	o

Second Round
1	(Japan) M Matsumoto (Japan) W Nagahara	21	21
(Italy) S Garino (Italy) L Iversen	4	7
(Chinese Taipei) Chang Y-l (Chinese Taipei) Cheng W-h	21	21
(France) A Desmons (France) J Moinard	12	10

Quarter-finals
1	(Japan) M Matsumoto (Japan) W Nagahara	21	21
(Chinese Taipei) Chang Y-l (Chinese Taipei) Cheng W-h	9	11

==== Section 2 ====
First Round
(Malaysia) Lim C S (Malaysia) Tan S J	w	/	o
(Denmark) J Finne-Ipsen (Denmark) R Søby Hansen

Second Round
3	(Denmark) M Fruergaard (Denmark) S Thygesen	21	21
(Sweden) E Karlsson (Sweden) J Magnusson	9	10
(Belgium) L Jaques (Belgium) F Vandenhoucke	13	14
(Malaysia) Lim C S (Malaysia) Tan S J	21	21

Quarter-finals
3	(Denmark) M Fruergaard (Denmark) S Thygesen	21	21
(Malaysia) Lim C S (Malaysia) Tan S J	17	11

=== Bottom half ===
==== Section 3 ====
First Round
(England) C Birch (England) J Moore	12	12
(Japan) M Aratama (Japan) A Watanabe	21	21
(Netherlands) D Jille (Netherlands) I van der Aar	21	22
(Germany) J Goliszewski (Germany) L Käpplein	15	20

Second Round
(Japan) M Aratama (Japan) A Watanabe	21	22
(Denmark) A Bøje (Denmark) S Lundgaard	16	20
(Netherlands) D Jille (Netherlands) I van der Aar	12	12
4	(Netherlands) S Piek (Netherlands) C Seinen	21	21

Quarter-finals
(Japan) M Aratama (Japan) A Watanabe	21	21
4	(Netherlands) S Piek (Netherlands) C Seinen	12	12

==== Section 4 ====
First Round
(France) S Bauer (France) M Le Turdu	21	20	21
(United States) E Kan (United States) I Zhong	17	22	15

Second Round
(France) S Bauer (France) M Le Turdu	13	11
(Russia) O Morozova (Russia) V Vorobeva	21	21
(Malaysia) Goh Y C (Malaysia) Teoh M X	12	18
2	(Japan) A Sakuramoto (Japan) Y Takahata	21	21

Quarter-finals
(Russia) O Morozova (Russia) V Vorobeva	9	8
2	(Japan) A Sakuramoto (Japan) Y Takahata	21	21

== Mixed doubles ==
=== Seeds ===
1. (England) Marcus Ellis / Lauren Smith (final)
2. (Netherlands) Jacco Arends / Selena Piek (second round)
3. (Russia) Evgenij Dremin / Evgenia Dimova (quarter-finals)
4. (Denmark) Niclas Nøhr / Sara Thygesen (champions)

=== Finals ===
Semi-finals
1	(England) Marcus Ellis (England) Lauren Smith	21	21
(Japan) Kohei Gondo (Japan) Ayane Kurihara	17	16
4	(Denmark) Niclas Nøhr (Denmark) Sara Thygesen	21	21
(Malaysia) Chen Tang Jie (Malaysia) Peck Yen Wei	10	18

Final
1	(England) Marcus Ellis (England) Lauren Smith	19	17
4	(Denmark) Niclas Nøhr (Denmark) Sara Thygesen	21	21

=== Top half ===
==== Section 1 ====
First Round
(Malaysia) Hoo P R (Malaysia) Cheah Y S	17	21	21
(Denmark) J Fischer Nielsen (Denmark) A Bøje	21	16	15
(Russia) A Zinchenko (Russia) O Morozova	14	11
(Denmark) L Mølhede (Denmark) S Lundgaard	21	21
(Spain) B Amaya (Spain) L Lucas	5	5
(England) G Mairs (England) J Moore	21	21

Second Round
1	(England) M Ellis (England) L Smith	24	21	21
(Malaysia) Hoo P R (Malaysia) Cheah Y S	26	12	11
(Denmark) L Mølhede (Denmark) S Lundgaard	21	13	21
(England) G Mairs (England) J Moore	16	21	15

Quarter-finals
1	(England) M Ellis (England) L Smith	21	21
(Denmark) L Mølhede (Denmark) S Lundgaard	14	19

==== Section 2 ====
First Round
(United States) M Fogarty (United States) I Zhong	21	15	16
(France) M Briot (France) S Bauer	19	21	21
(Japan) K Gondo (Japan) A Kurihara	21	21
(Spain) A Zapico (Spain) L Usle	6	16
(Denmark) K Knudsen (Denmark) I Nielsen	17	21	21
(France) F Delrue (France) J Moinard	21	14	16

Second Round
3	(Russia) E Dremin (Russia) E Dimova	21	21
(France) M Briot (France) S Bauer	12	17
(Japan) K Gondo (Japan) A Kurihara	21	21
(Denmark) K Knudsen (Denmark) I Nielsen	15	14

Quarter-finals
3	(Russia) E Dremin (Russia) E Dimova	12	17
(Japan) K Gondo (Japan) A Kurihara	21	21

=== Bottom half ===
==== Section 3 ====
First Round
(Netherlands) R Tabeling (Netherlands) C Seinen	21	21
(Germany) J Zurwonne (Germany) E Janssens	18	16
(India) V G Prasad (India) J Dewangan
(Scotland) A Hall (Scotland) J MacPherson	w	/	o
(France) K Lovang (France) M Le Turdu	9	21
(Malaysia) Man W C (Malaysia) Tan S J	21	23
(Netherlands) R Jille (Netherlands) I van der Aar	21	15	17
4	(Denmark) N Nøhr (Denmark) S Thygesen	13	21	21

Second Round
(Netherlands) R Tabeling (Netherlands) C Seinen	21	19	16
(Scotland) A Hall (Scotland) J MacPherson	7	21	21
(Malaysia) Man W C (Malaysia) Tan S J	9	13
4	(Denmark) N Nøhr (Denmark) S Thygesen	21	21

Quarter-finals
(Scotland) A Hall (Scotland) J MacPherson	17	13
4	(Denmark) N Nøhr (Denmark) S Thygesen	21	21

==== Section 4 ====
First Round
(Denmark) M Mikkelsen (Denmark) M Surrow	w	/	o
(England) B Lane (England) J Pugh
(Denmark) M Bay-Smidt (Denmark) R Søby Hansen	21	12	12
(Malaysia) Chen T J (Malaysia) Peck Y W	12	21	21
(Russia) R Kargaev (Russia) V Vorobeva	21	21
(France) W Villeger (France) A Desmons	9	19

Second Round
(Denmark) M Mikkelsen (Denmark) M Surrow	16	14
(Malaysia) Chen T J (Malaysia) Peck Y W	21	21
(Russia) R Kargaev (Russia) V Vorobeva	10	21	21
2	(Netherlands) J Arends (Netherlands) S Piek	21	18	19

Quarter-finals
(Malaysia) Chen T J (Malaysia) Peck Y W	21	21
(Russia) R Kargaev (Russia) V Vorobeva	17	18

Preceded by Debut year	Spain Masters	Succeeded by 2019 Spain Masters
Preceded by 2018 Vietnam Open	BWF World Tour; 2018 BWF season	Succeeded by 2018 Hyderabad Open
