= 2015 Russia Open Grand Prix =

Tournament details
- Dates: July 21, 2015 - July 26, 2015
- Level: Grand Prix
- Total prize money: US$50,000
- Venue: Sports Hall Olympic
- Location: Vladivostok, Russia

Champions
- Men's singles: (Indonesia) Tommy Sugiarto
- Women's singles: (Czech Republic) Kristina Gavnholt
- Men's doubles: (Russia) Vladimir Ivanov (Russia) Ivan Sozonov
- Women's doubles: (Bulgaria) Gabriela Stoeva (Bulgaria) Stefani Stoeva
- Mixed doubles: (Malaysia) Chan Peng Soon (Malaysia) Goh Liu Ying

The 2015 Russia Open Grand Prix was the thirteenth grand prix gold and grand prix tournament of the 2015 BWF Grand Prix Gold and Grand Prix. The tournament was held in Sports Hall Olympic, Vladivostok, Russia July 21 until July 26, 2015, and had a total purse of 50,000.

== Players by nation ==
Nation	First round	Second round	Third round	Quarterfinals	Semifinals	Final

== Men's singles ==
=== Seeds ===
1. (Indonesia) Tommy Sugiarto (champion)
2. (France) Brice Leverdez (3rd round)
3. (India) Ajay Jayaram (semi-final)
4. (Malaysia) Zulfadli Zulkiffli (semi-final)
5. (Malaysia) Chong Wei Feng (quarter-final)
6. (Spain) Pablo Abián (quarter-final)
7. (Denmark) Joachim Persson (withdrew)
8. (Israel) Misha Zilberman (quarter-final)
9. (Czech Republic) Petr Koukal (2nd round)
10. (France) Thomas Rouxel (W/O)
11. (Russia) Vladimir Malkov (quarter-final)
12. (United States) Howard Shu (2nd round)
13. (Austria) Luka Wraber (final)
14. (Sweden) Henri Hurskainen (3rd round)
15. (Austria) David Obernosterer (3rd round)
16. (Finland) Eetu Heino (3rd round)

=== Finals ===
Quarterfinals
1	(Indonesia) Tommy Sugiarto	21	21
6	(Spain) Pablo Abián	17	9
3	(India) Ajay Jayaram	21	21
5	(Malaysia) Chong Wei Feng	15	13
8	(Israel) Misha Zilberman	17	9
4	(Malaysia) Zulfadli Zulkiffli	21	21
11	(Russia) Vladimir Malkov	18	14
(Estonia) Raul Must	21	21

Semifinals
1	(Indonesia) Tommy Sugiarto	21	21
3	(India) Ajay Jayaram	17	7
4	(Malaysia) Zulfadli Zulkiffli	12	20
(Estonia) Raul Must	21	22

Final
1	(Indonesia) Tommy Sugiarto	21	21
(Estonia) Raul Must	16	10

=== Top half ===
==== Section 1 ====
First round
1	(Indonesia) Tommy Sugiarto
(England) Rhys Walker	W	/	O
(Russia) Rodion Alimov	21	21
Q8	(Kazakhstan) Khaitmurat Kulmatov	17	13
13	(Austria) Luka Wraber	21	24
(Egypt) Abdelrahman Kashkal	14	22
(Russia) Andrey Parakhodin	14	9
(Bulgaria) Blagovest Kisyov	21	21

Second round
1	(Indonesia) Tommy Sugiarto	21	21
(Russia) Rodion Alimov	7	16
13	(Austria) Luka Wraber	21	21
(Bulgaria) Blagovest Kisyov	16	11

Third round
1	(Indonesia) Tommy Sugiarto	21	21
13	(Austria) Luka Wraber	13	9

==== Section 2 ====
First round
6	(Spain) Pablo Abián
(Slovenia) Iztok Utrosa	W	/	O
(Russia) Nikita Khakimov	18	12
(Czech Republic) Milan Ludík	21	21
16	(Finland) Eetu Heino	21	21
Q5	(Uzbekistan) Amrullo Bakhshullaev	12	10
(Russia) Andrey Jdanov	11	21	22
Q4	(Russia) Vladimir Shipilenko	21	17	20

Second round
6	(Spain) Pablo Abián	5	21	21
(Czech Republic) Milan Ludík	21	17	14
16	(Finland) Eetu Heino	21	21
(Russia) Andrey Jdanov	11	10

Third round
6	(Spain) Pablo Abián	21	21
16	(Finland) Eetu Heino	17	15

==== Section 3 ====
First round
3	(India) Ajay Jayaram	21	21
PFQ	(Russia) Kirill Timofeev	7	7
(Belgium) Maxime Moreels	W	/	O
(Slovakia) Jarolim Vicen
10	(France) Thomas Rouxel	W	/	O
(Russia) Anatoliy Yartsev
PFQ	(Russia) Egor Efanov
BYE

Second round
3	(India) Ajay Jayaram	21	21
(Slovakia) Jarolim Vicen	18	9
(Russia) Anatoliy Yartsev	21	21
(Russia) Egor Efanov	5	11

Third round
3	(India) Ajay Jayaram	21	21
(Russia) Anatoliy Yartsev	18	13

==== Section 4 ====
First round
5	(Malaysia) Chong Wei Feng	21	21
(Russia) Vladimir Ivanov	15	9
BYE
(Czech Republic) Jan Fröhlich
12	(United States) Howard Shu
(Chinese Taipei) Kuo Po-cheng	W	/	O
PFQ	(Japan) Kento Horiuchi	24	19	21
(Ukraine) Artem Pochtarov	22	21	15

Second round
5	(Malaysia) Chong Wei Feng	21	21
(Czech Republic) Jan Fröhlich	7	13
12	(United States) Howard Shu	15	19
(Japan) Kento Horiuchi	21	21

Third round
5	(Malaysia) Chong Wei Feng	21	21
PFQ	(Japan) Kento Horiuchi	17	16

=== Bottom half ===
==== Section 5 ====
First round
(Russia) Denis Grachev	21	13	21
(Lithuania) Kestutis Navickas	18	21	16
(Russia) Vladimir Rusin	13	23	19
15	(Austria) David Obernosterer	21	21	21
PFQ	(Japan) Kenya Mitsuhashi	11	21	12
(Estonia) Kalle Koljonen	21	17	21
(Malaysia) Zulhelmi Zulkiffli	17	15
8	(Israel) Misha Zilberman	21	21

Second round
5	(Russia) Denis Grachev	19	21	15
15	(Austria) David Obernosterer	21	13	21
(Estonia) Kalle Koljonen	14	16
8	(Israel) Misha Zilberman	21	21

Third round
15	(Austria) David Obernosterer	18	19
8	(Israel) Misha Zilberman	21	21

==== Section 6 ====
First round
(Russia) Sergey Sirant	21	26	19
(Norway) Marius Myhre	7	28	21
(Kazakhstan) Artur Niyazov	14	18
14	(Sweden) Henri Hurskainen	21	21
PFQ	(Russia) Alexander Butovetstkiy	W	/	O
(Canada) Martin Giuffre	W	/	O
(Russia) Grigoriy Martynenko	7	3
4	(Malaysia) Zulfadli Zulkiffli	21	21

Second round
5	(Norway) Marius Myhre	20	21	13
14	(Sweden) Henri Hurskainen	22	17	21
BYE
4	(Malaysia) Zulfadli Zulkiffli

Third round
14	(Sweden) Henri Hurskainen	24	19	14
4	(Malaysia) Zulfadli Zulkiffli	22	21	21

==== Section 7 ====
First round
BYE
(Belgium) Yuhan Tan	W	/	O
(United States) Sattawat Pongnairat	19	19
11	(Russia) Vladimir Malkov	21	21
(Portugal) Pedro Martins	21	18	21
(Russia) Pavel Kotsarenko	9	21	13
(Japan) Ryotaro Maruo	21	21
PFQ	(Japan) Yuta Watanabe	12	8

Second round
BYE
11	(Russia) Vladimir Malkov
(Portugal) Pedro Martins	14	21	21
(Japan) Ryotaro Maruo	21	6	13

Third round
11	(Russia) Vladimir Malkov	21	16	21
(Portugal) Pedro Martins	14	21	18

==== Section 8 ====
First round
(France) Lucas Corvée	W	/	O
(Estonia) Raul Must
(Uzbekistan) Artyom Savatyugin	9	14
9	(Czech Republic) Petr Koukal	21	21
(Scotland) Alistair Casey	21	21
(Russia) Mikhail Nesterenko	4	4
(Russia) Gordey Kosenko	W	/	O
2	(France) Brice Leverdez

Second round
(Estonia) Raul Must	21	21
(Czech Republic) Petr Koukal	16	14
(Scotland) Alistair Casey	14	5
2	(France) Brice Leverdez	21	21

Third round
(Estonia) Raul Must	21	16	21
2	(France) Brice Leverdez	12	21	11

== Women's singles ==
=== Seeds ===
1. (Germany) Karin Schnaase (1st round)
2. (Bulgaria) Linda Zetchiri (2nd round)
3. (United States) Iris Wang (quarter-final)
4. (Switzerland) Sabrina Jaquet (withdrew)
5. (United States) Rong Schafer (1st round)
6. (United States) Jamie Subandhi (quarter-final)
7. (Russia) Ksenia Polikarpova (1st round)
8. (Russia) Natalia Perminova (quarter-final)

=== Finals ===
Semifinals
Q2	(Japan) Mayu Matsumoto	21	21
Q4	(Japan) Chisato Hoshi	18	18
(Czech Republic) Kristína Gavnholt	21	21
(Russia) Evgeniya Kosetskaya	19	15

Final
Q2	(Japan) Mayu Matsumoto	10	20
(Czech Republic) Kristína Gavnholt	21	22

=== Top half ===
==== Section 1 ====
First round
1	(Germany) Karin Schnaase	21	19	17
Q2	(Japan) Mayu Matsumoto	18	21	21
PFQ	(Australia) Melinda Sun	9	10
PFQ	(Russia) Ekaterina Bolotova	21	21
6	(United States) Jamie Subandhi
(England) Fontaine Mica Chapman	W	/	O
(Austria) Elisabeth Baldauf	18	21	21
(Finland) Airi Mikkela	21	19	23

Second round
Q2	(Japan) Mayu Matsumoto	21	21	21
PFQ	(Russia) Ekaterina Bolotova	23	12	17
6	(United States) Jamie Subandhi	21	21
(Finland) Airi Mikkela	15	12

Quarterfinals
Q2	(Japan) Mayu Matsumoto	21	21
6	(United States) Jamie Subandhi	9	14

==== Section 2 ====
First round
3	(United States) Iris Wang	21	21
(Slovakia) Jana Ciznarova	11	4
(Russia) Elena Komendrovskaja	18	22
PFQ	(Japan) Yuka Kusunose	21	24
7	(Russia) Ksenia Polikarpova	14	16
Q4	(Japan) Chisato Hoshi	21	21
(Belgium) Lianne Tan	21	21
(Czech Republic) Zuzana Pavelkova	18	3

Second round
3	(United States) Iris Wang	21	23
PFQ	(Japan) Yuka Kusunose	18	21
Q4	(Japan) Chisato Hoshi	21	23	21
(Belgium) Lianne Tan	8	25	12

Quarterfinals
3	(United States) Iris Wang	19	17
Q4	(Japan) Chisato Hoshi	21	21

=== Bottom half ===
==== Section 3 ====
First round
(Nigeria) Grace Gabriel	17	19
(Hungary) Laura Sárosi	21	21
Q1	(India) Lalita Dahiya	5	9
8	(Russia) Natalia Perminova	21	21
PFQ	(Egypt) Hadia Hosny	7	11
(Russia) Olga Golovanova	21	21
(Czech Republic) Kristína Gavnholt	21	21
PFQ	(Russia) Anastasia Chervyakova	13	18

Second round
(Hungary) Laura Sárosi	15	15
8	(Russia) Natalia Perminova	21	21
(Russia) Olga Golovanova	15	14
(Czech Republic) Kristína Gavnholt	21	21

Quarterfinals
8	(Russia) Natalia Perminova	16	17
(Czech Republic) Kristína Gavnholt	21	21

==== Section 4 ====
First round
Q3	(Kazakhstan) Veronika Sorokina	12	11
(Russia) Evgeniya Kosetskaya	21	21
(Mauritius) Kate Foo Kune	W	/	O
5	(United States) Rong Schafer
(Russia) Victoria Slobodjanuk	21	18	19
(India) Tanvi Lad	13	21	21
(Finland) Nanna Vainio	13	21	11
(Bulgaria) Linda Zetchiri	21	18	21

Second round
(Russia) Evgeniya Kosetskaya	21	21
5	(United States) Rong Schafer	17	13
(India) Tanvi Lad	15	21	21
2	(Bulgaria) Linda Zetchiri	21	7	12

Quarterfinals
(Russia) Evgeniya Kosetskaya	26	21	21
(India) Tanvi Lad	28	13	19

== Men's doubles ==
=== Seeds ===
1. (Russia) Vladimir Ivanov / Ivan Sozonov (champion)
2. (Malaysia) Goh V Shem / Tan Wee Kiong (final)
3. (India) Manu Attri / B. Sumeeth Reddy (semi-final)
4. (England) Marcus Ellis / Chris Langridge (1st round)
5. (United States) Phillip Chew / Sattawat Pongnairat (1st round)
6. (France) Baptiste Careme / Ronan Labar (1st round)
7. (Malaysia) Koo Kien Keat / Tan Boon Heong (quarter-final)
8. (Chinese Taipei) Lu Ching-Yao / Tien Tzu-Chieh (withdrew)

=== Finals ===
Semifinals

Final

1
- (Russia) Vladimir Ivanov
- (Russia) Ivan Sozonov
19
21
21

3
- (India) Manu Attri
- (India) B. Sumeeth Reddy
21
7
16

1
- (Russia) Vladimir Ivanov
- (Russia) Ivan Sozonov
22
21

2
- (Malaysia) Goh V Shem
- (Malaysia) Tan Wee Kiong
20
19

- (Malaysia) Hoon Thien How
- (Malaysia) Lim Khim Wah
21
19
18

2
- (Malaysia) Goh V Shem
- (Malaysia) Tan Wee Kiong
15
21
21

=== Top half ===
==== Section 1 ====
First round

Second round

Quarterfinals

1
- (Russia) Vladimir Ivanov
- (Russia) Ivan Sozonov
21
11

- (Malaysia) Lee Yan Sheng
- (Malaysia) Lin Woon Fui
11
3^{r}

1
- (Russia) Vladimir Ivanov
- (Russia) Ivan Sozonov
21
21

- (Russia) G Martynenko
- (Russia) Sergey Sirant
4
4

- (Russia) G Martynenko
- (Russia) Sergey Sirant

- (England) Peter Briggs
- (England) Tom Wolfenden
W
/
O

1
- (Russia) Vladimir Ivanov
- (Russia) Ivan Sozonov
21
21

7
- (Malaysia) Koo Kien Keat
- (Malaysia) Tan Boon Heong
14
13

7
- (Malaysia) Koo Kien Keat
- (Malaysia) Tan Boon Heong

- (Japan) Taiki Shimada
- (Japan) Hiroki Takeuchi
W
/
O

7
- (Malaysia) Koo Kien Keat
- (Malaysia) Tan Boon Heong
16
21
21

- (Japan) Kazuaki Oshima
- (Japan) Yuki Umino
21
10
15

- (Russia) Rodion Alimov
- (Russia) Pavel Kotsarenko
13
12

- (Japan) Kazuaki Oshima
- (Japan) Yuki Umino
21
21

==== Section 2 ====
First round

Second round

Quarterfinals

3
- (India) M Attri
- (India) B. S Reddy
21
21

- (Malaysia) Z B Zulkifli
- (Malaysia) Z Zulkifli
11
15

3
- (India) M Attri
- (India) B. S Reddy

No match

- (Russia) A Goncharenko
- (Russia) A Kozyrev

Q2
No match

3
- (India) Manu Attri
- (India) B. Sumeeth Reddy
w
/
o

PFQ
- (Russia) A Ashmarin
- (Russia) V Durkin

6
- (France) B Careme
- (France) R Labar
13
23

PFQ
- (Russia) A Ashmarin
- (Russia) V Durkin
21
25

PFQ
- (Russia) A Ashmarin
- (Russia) V Durkin
21
21

- (Ukraine) G Natarov
- (Ukraine) A Pochtarov
13
12

- (Ukraine) G Natarov
- (Ukraine) A Pochtarov
21
21

- (Russia) E Efanov
- (Russia) M Nesterenko
11
10

=== Bottom half ===
==== Section 3 ====
First round

Second round

Quarterfinals

PFQ
- (Japan) K Mitsuhashi
- (Japan) Y Watanabe
21
21

- (Russia) V Rusin
- (Russia) I Zdanov
16
8

PFQ
- (Japan) K Mitsuhashi
- (Japan) Y Watanabe
19
24

- (Russia) N Khakimov
- (Russia) V Kuznetsov
21
26

- (Russia) N Khakimov
- (Russia) V Kuznetsov
21
21

5
- (United States) P Chew
- (United States) S Pongnairat
19
10

1
- (Russia) Nikita Khakimov
- (Russia) Vasily Kuznetsov
9
21

7
- (Malaysia) Hoon Thien How
- (Malaysia) Lim Khim Wah
21
23

- (Russia) E Dremin
- (Russia) D Grachev
19
17

- (Malaysia) Hoon T H
- (Malaysia) Lim K W
21
21

- (Malaysia) Hoon T H
- (Malaysia) Lim K W
23
21
21

- (Malaysia) Mak H C
- (Malaysia) Teo K S
25
15
15

- (Malaysia) Mak H C
- (Malaysia) Teo K S
w
/
o

4
- (England) M Ellis
- (England) C Langridge

==== Section 4 ====
First round

Second round

Quarterfinals

(Uzbekistan) A Bakhshullaev
(Uzbekistan) A Savatyugin
15
8

- (Russia) K Abramov
- (Russia) A Zinchenko
21
21

- (Russia) K Abramov
- (Russia) A Zinchenko
w
/
o

No match

Q1

8
- (Chinese Taipei) Lu C-y ^{Withdrawn}
- (Chinese Taipei) Tien T-c

- (Russia) Konstantin Abramov
- (Russia) Alexandr Zinchenko
14
7

2
- (Malaysia) Goh V Shem
- (Malaysia) Tan Wee Kiong
21
21

- (Russia) V Shipilenko
- (Russia) K Timofeev
14
10

PFQ
- (Kazakhstan) K Kulmatov
- (Kazakhstan) A Niyazov
21
21

PFQ
- (Kazakhstan) K Kulmatov
- (Kazakhstan) A Niyazov
14
7

2
- (Malaysia) Goh V S
- (Malaysia) Tan W K
21
21

- (Russia) R Kargaev
- (Russia) A Yartsev
14
15

2
- (Malaysia) Goh V S
- (Malaysia) Tan W K
21
21

== Women's doubles ==
=== Seeds ===
1. (Bulgaria) Gabriela Stoeva / Stefani Stoeva (champion)
2. (Germany) Johanna Goliszewski / Carla Nelte (final)
3. (Russia) Ekaterina Bolotova / Evgeniya Kosetskaya (quarter-final)
4. (India) Pradnya Gadre / N. Siki Reddy (withdrew)

=== Finals ===
Semifinals

Final

1
- (Bulgaria) Gabriela Stoeva
- (Bulgaria) Stefani Stoeva
21
21

- (Japan) Rie Etoh
- (Japan) Aoi Matsuda
18
18

1
- (Bulgaria) Gabriela Stoeva
- (Bulgaria) Stefani Stoeva
21
21

2
- (Germany) Johanna Goliszewski
- (Germany) Carla Nelte
15
17

- (Japan) Arisa Higashino
- (Japan) Chisato Hoshi
11
22
16

2
- (Germany) Johanna Goliszewski
- (Germany) Carla Nelte
21
20
21

=== Top half ===
==== Section 1 ====
First round

Second round

Quarterfinals

1
- (Bulgaria) G Stoeva
- (Bulgaria) S Stoeva

Bye

1
- (Bulgaria) G Stoeva
- (Bulgaria) S Stoeva
21
21

- (Egypt) N Ashraf
- (Egypt) M Eltanany
5
6

- (Egypt) N Ashraf
- (Egypt) M Eltanany

Bye

1
- (Bulgaria) Gabriela Stoeva
- (Bulgaria) Stefani Stoeva
21
21

- (Russia) Irina Khlebko
- (Russia) Ksenia Polikarpova
17
10

- (Russia) D Dzhedzhla ^{Withdrawn}

Bye

No match

- (Russia) I Khlebko
- (Russia) K Polikarpova

- (Russia) I Khlebko
- (Russia) K Polikarpova

Bye

==== Section 2 ====
First round

Second round

Quarterfinals

3
- (Russia) E Bolotova
- (Russia) E Kosetskaya

Bye

3
- (Russia) E Bolotova
- (Russia) E Kosetskaya
21
21

- (Russia) V Makkoveeva
- (Russia) D Radchenko
8
7

- (Russia) V Makkoveeva
- (Russia) D Radchenko

Bye

3
- (Russia) E Bolotova
- (Russia) E Kosetskaya
21
20
22

- (Japan) R Etoh
- (Japan) A Matsuda
17
22
24

- (Japan) R Etoh
- (Japan) A Matsuda

Bye

- (Japan) R Etoh
- (Japan) A Matsuda
21
21

- (Russia) E Dimova
- (Russia) N Vislova
16
16

- (Japan) M Matsumoto
- (Japan) W Nagahara

- (Russia) E Dimova
- (Russia) N Vislova
w
/
o

=== Bottom half ===
==== Section 3 ====
First round

Second round

Quarterfinals

- (Japan) A Higashino
- (Japan) C Hoshi
w
/
0

- (Russia) V Dergunova
- (Russia) O Morozova

- (Japan) A Higashino
- (Japan) C Hoshi
w
/
o

- (Russia) S Kononykhina
- (Russia) O Kosenko

Bye

- (Russia) S Kononykhina
- (Russia) O Kosenko

- (Japan) Arisa Higashino
- (Japan) Chisato Hoshi

No match

Bye

- (Russia) O Golovanova
- (Russia) V Vorobeva

No match

No match

Bye

- (India) P Gadre
- (India) N. S Reddy

==== Section 4 ====
First round

Second round

Quarterfinals

Bye

- (Russia) A Davletova
- (Russia) K Evgenova

- (Russia) A Davletova
- (Russia) K Evgenova

No match

Bye

- (Russia) O Lipkina
- (Russia) J Zapolskaya

- (Russia) Alina Davletova
- (Russia) Ksenia Evgenova
12
12

2
- (Germany) Johanna Goliszewski
21
21

Bye

- (Russia) T Bibik
- (Russia) E Komendrovskaja

- (Russia) T Bibik
- (Russia) E Komendrovskaja
12
15

2
- (Germany) J Goliszewski
- (Germany) C Nelte
21
21

Bye

2
- (Germany) J Goliszewski
- (Germany) C Nelte

== Mixed doubles ==
=== Seeds ===
1. (United States) Phillip Chew / Jamie Subandhi (2nd round)
2. (Russia) Evgenij Dremin / Evgenia Dimova (quarter-final)
3. (Russia) Vitalij Durkin / Nina Vislova (semi-final)
4. (France) Ronan Labar / Emilie Lefel (quarter-final)

=== Finals ===
Semifinals

Final

- (Malaysia) Chan Peng Soon
- (Malaysia) Goh Liu Ying
22
0

3
- (Russia) Vitalij Durkin
- (Russia) Nina Vislova
20
0^{r}

- (Malaysia) Chan Peng Soon
- (Malaysia) Goh Liu Ying
21
23

- (Japan) Yuta Watanabe
- (Japan) Arisa Higashino
13
21

- (India) Akshay Dewalkar
- (India) Prajakta Sawant
10
8

- (Japan) Yuta Watanabe
- (Japan) Arisa Higashino
21
21

=== Top half ===
==== Section 1 ====
First round

Second round

Quarterfinals

1
- (United States) Phillip Chew
- (United States) Jamie Subandhi

B
Y
E

1
- (United States) Phillip Chew
- (United States) Jamie Subandhi
17
18

- (Russia) Rodion Alimov
- (Russia) Alina Davletova
21
21

- (Uzbekistan) Artyom Savatyugin
- (Russia) Viktoriia Vorobeva
W
/
O

- (Russia) Rodion Alimov
- (Russia) Alina Davletova

- (Russia) Rodion Alimov
- (Russia) Alina Davletova
15
19

- (Malaysia) Peng Soon Chan
- (Malaysia) Goh Liu Ying
21
21

- (Russia) Gordey Kosenko
- (Russia) Olga Lipkina
W
/
O

- (Malaysia) Peng Soon Chan
- (Malaysia) Goh Liu Ying

- (Malaysia) Peng Soon Chan
- (Malaysia) Goh Liu Ying
21
17
21

- (Russia) Anatoliy Yartsev
- (Russia) Evgeniya Kosetskaya
11
21
12

- (Russia) Anatoliy Yartsev
- (Russia) Evgeniya Kosetskaya

- (India) Kona Tarun
- (India) N. Siki Reddy
W
/
O

==== Section 2 ====
First round

Second round

Quarterfinals

3
- (Russia) Vitalij Durkin
- (Russia) Nina Vislova
21
21

- (Austria) David Obernosterer
- (Austria) Elisabeth Baldauf
7
14

3
- (Russia) Vitalij Durkin
- (Russia) Nina Vislova
21
21

- (Russia) Andrey Parakhodin
- (Russia) Anastasia Chervyakova
13
9

- (Russia) Andrey Parakhodin
- (Russia) Anastasia Chervyakova

- (England) Harley Towler
- (England) Emily Westwood
W
/
O

3
- (Russia) Vitalij Durkin
- (Russia) Nina Vislova
21
21

- (France) Gaetan Mittelheisser
- (France) Audrey Fontaine
15
12

- (Russia) Konstantin Abramov
- (Russia) Irina Khlebko
21
10
18

- (Japan) Kenya Mitsuhashi
- (Japan) Chisato Hoshi
19
21
21

- (Japan) Kenya Mitsuhashi
- (Japan) Chisato Hoshi
11
12

- (France) Gaetan Mittelheisser
- (France) Audrey Fontaine
21
21

- (Russia) Iiya Zdanov
- (Russia) Tatjana Bibik
10
21

- (France) Gaetan Mittelheisser
- (France) Audrey Fontaine
21
23

=== Bottom half ===
==== Section 3 ====
First round

Second round

Quarterfinals

- (India) Akshay Dewalkar
- (India) Prajakta Sawant
21
21

- (Russia) Rodion Kargaev
- (Russia) Ekaterina Bolotova
16
16

- (India) Akshay Dewalkar
- (India) Prajakta Sawant
21
21

- (Egypt) Abdelrahman Kashkal
- (Egypt) Hadia Hosny
11
14

- (Russia) Alexander Butovetstkiy
- (Russia) Ksenia Evgenova
W
/
O

- (Egypt) Abdelrahman Kashkal
- (Egypt) Hadia Hosny
21
21

- (India) Akshay Dewalkar
- (India) Prajakta Sawant
21
21

4
- (France) Ronan Labar
- (France) Emilie Lefel
18
18

- (Malaysia) Wong Fai Yin
- (Malaysia) Chow Mei Kuan
21
21

- (Russia) Vladimir Shipilenko
- (Russia) Valeriia Makkoveeva
6
10

- (Malaysia) Wong Fai Yin
- (Malaysia) Chow Mei Kuan
16
16

4
- (France) Ronan Labar
- (France) Emilie Lefel
21
21

- (Russia) Andrey Jdanov
- (Russia) Olesia Kister
7
9

4
- (France) Ronan Labar
- (France) Emilie Lefel
21
21

==== Section 4 ====
First round

Second round

Quarterfinals

- (Russia) Alexandr Zinchenko
- (Russia) Olga Morozova
W
/
O

- (Japan) Yuta Watanabe
- (Japan) Arisa Higashino
21
21

- (Japan) Yuta Watanabe
- (Japan) Arisa Higashino
21
21

- (Russia) Vadim Novoselov
- (Russia) Julia Zapolskaya
4
8

- (Kazakhstan) Artur Niyazov
- (Kazakhstan) Veronika Sorokina
18
14

- (Russia) Vadim Novoselov
- (Russia) Julia Zapolskaya
21
21

- (Japan) Yuta Watanabe
- (Japan) Arisa Higashino
21
21

2
- (Russia) Evgenij Dremin
- (Russia) Evgenia Dimova
17
16

- (Russia) Mikhail Nesterenko
- (Russia) Daria Radchenko
11
16

(India) Dinesh Chaudhry
(India) Lalita Dahiya
21
21

(India) Dinesh Chaudhry
(India) Lalita Dahiya
4
7

2
- (Russia) Evgenij Dremin
- (Russia) Evgenia Dimova
21
21

BYE

2
- (Russia) Evgenij Dremin
- (Russia) Evgenia Dimova

Preceded by 2015 Chinese Taipei Open Grand Prix Gold	BWF Grand Prix Gold and Grand Prix; 2015 BWF season	Succeeded by 2015 Vietnam Open Grand Prix
