= 2017 Scottish Open Grand Prix =

Tournament details
- Dates: 22–26 November
- Level: Grand Prix
- Total prize money: US$65,000
- Venue: Emirates Arena
- Location: Glasgow, Scotland

Champions
- Men's singles: (England) Toby Penty
- Women's singles: (Scotland) Kirsty Gilmour
- Men's doubles: (Netherlands) Jelle Maas (Netherlands) Robin Tabeling
- Women's doubles: (Netherlands) Selena Piek (Netherlands) Cheryl Seinen
- Mixed doubles: (Netherlands) Jacco Arends (Netherlands) Selena Piek

The 2017 Scottish Open Grand Prix was a badminton tournament which took place at Emirates Arena in Glasgow in the Scotland from 22 to 26 November 2017 and had a total purse of $65,000.

== Tournament ==
The 2017 Scottish Open Grand Prix was the seventeenth Grand Prix's badminton tournament of the 2017 BWF Grand Prix Gold and Grand Prix and also part of the Scottish Open championships. This tournament organized by the Badminton Scotland, with sanction from the BWF.

=== Venue ===
This international tournament was held at Emirates Arena in Glasgow, Scotland.

=== Point distribution ===
Below is the table with the point distribution for each phase of the tournament based on the BWF points system for the Grand Prix event.

Winner	Runner-up	3/4	5/8	9/16	17/32	33/64	65/128	129/256	257/512	513/1024
5,500	4,680	3,850	3,030	2,110	1,290	510	240	100	45	30

=== Prize money ===
The total prize money for this year tournament is US$65,000. Distribution of prize money will be in accordance with BWF regulations.

Event	Winner	Finals	Semifinals	Quarterfinals	Last 16
Singles	$4,875	$2,470	$942.50	$390	$227.50
Doubles	$5,135	$2,470	$910	$471.25	$243.75

== Men's singles ==
=== Seeds ===
1. (England) Rajiv Ouseph (withdrew)
2. (Brazil) Ygor Coelho (quarterfinals)
3. (Denmark) Emil Holst (quarterfinals)
4. (Spain) Pablo Abián (first round)
5. (Germany) Fabian Roth (withdrew)
6. (Netherlands) Mark Caljouw (semifinals)
7. (Russia) Vladimir Malkov (first round)
8. (Denmark) Kim Bruun (withdrew)
9. (Estonia) Raul Must (third round)
10. (Denmark) Rasmus Gemke (semifinals)
11. (Scotland) Kieran Merrilees (first round)
12. (India) Subhankar Dey (third round)
13. (England) Toby Penty (champion)
14. (Finland) Eetu Heino (second round)
15. (Finland) Kalle Koljonen (third round)
16. (France) Lucas Corvée (final)

=== Finals ===
Quarterfinals
PFQ	(India) R. M. V. Gurusaidutt	16	8
6	(Netherlands) Mark Caljouw	21	21
3	(Denmark) Emil Holst	11	16
16	(France) Lucas Corvée	21	21
(Finland) Henri Aarnio	12	13
13	(England) Toby Penty	21	21
10	(Denmark) Rasmus Gemke	21	21
2	(Brazil) Ygor Coelho	17	15

Semifinals
6	(Netherlands) Mark Caljouw	16	21	17
16	(France) Lucas Corvée	21	16	21
13	(England) Toby Penty	14	21	21
10	(Denmark) Rasmus Gemke	21	14	17

Final
16	(France) Lucas Corvée	14	22
13	(England) Toby Penty	21	24

=== Top half ===
==== Section 1 ====
First round
PFQ	(India) R. M. V. Gurusaidutt	14	21	21
Q7	(Myanmar) P P Naing	21	14	11
(Austria) R Gnedt	16	16
(Hungary) G Krausz	21	21
11	(Scotland) K Merrilees	19	15
(India) K R Rajarajan	21	21
(Sri Lanka) N Karunaratne	21	11
(Sweden) F Burestedt	16	3^{r}

Second round
PFQ	(India) R. M. V. Gurusaidutt	21	21
(Hungary) G Krausz	19	7
(India) K R Rajarajan	10	21	21
(Sri Lanka) N Karunaratne	21	18	18

Third round
PFQ	(India) R. M. V. Gurusaidutt	21	8
(India) K R Rajarajan	9	4^{r}

==== Section 2 ====
First round
6	(Netherlands) M Caljouw	21	22
PFQ	(England) L Pearce	12	20
(France) T J Popov	21	21
(Portugal) B Atilano	16	11
14	(Finland) E Heino	18	21	21
Q3	(England) J Torjussen	21	9	17
(Spain) L E Peñalver	29	18	17
(Denmark) V Svendsen	27	21	21

Second round
6	(Netherlands) M Caljouw	21	21
(France) T J Popov	17	14
14	(Finland) E Heino	15	21	13
(Denmark) V Svendsen	21	17	21

Third round
6	(Netherlands) M Caljouw	23	14	21
(Denmark) V Svendsen	21	21	10

==== Section 3 ====
First round
3	(Denmark) E Holst	21	21
(Germany) L Schänzler	9	15
Q5	(Malaysia) Yeoh S Z	21	21
(India) S Sipani	13	12
9	(Estonia) R Must	21	21
(England) R Green	15	8
(Bulgaria) I Rusev	21	17	14
PFQ	(England) J Douse	16	21	21

Second round
3	(Denmark) E Holst	21	21
Q5	(Malaysia) Yeoh S Z	17	11
9	(Estonia) R Must	21	21
PFQ	(England) J Douse	17	17

Third round
3	(Denmark) E Holst	21	21
9	(Estonia) R Must	19	17

==== Section 4 ====
First round
PFQ	(England) D Jones	21	18	11
(Netherlands) N Fransman	15	21	21
(England) S Parsons	21	22
Q6	(Scotland) M Grimley	15	20
16	(France) L Corvée	21	21
(Czech Republic) L Zevl	11	7
Q8	(Ukraine) D Zavadsky	8	9
(Finland) I Heino	21	21

Second round
(Netherlands) N Fransman	15	13
(England) S Parsons	21	21
16	(France) L Corvée	21	21
(Finland) I Heino	14	14

Third round
(England) S Parsons	11	21	11
16	(France) L Corvée	21	16	21

=== Bottom half ===
==== Section 5 ====
First round
(Scotland) B Torrance	15	22	12
(Switzerland) C Kirchmayr	21	20	21
(England) M S-Smith	14	10
12	(India) S Dey	21	21
(Bulgaria) A Vlaar	13	8
(Finland) H Aarnio	21	21
(Sweden) A Tsai	21	17	16
PFQ	(Malaysia) Alfred Lau Y L	15	21	21

Second round
(Switzerland) C Kirchmayr	12	14
12	(India) S Dey	21	21
(Finland) H Aarnio	21	21
PFQ	(Malaysia) Alfred Lau Y L	17	16

Third round
12	(India) S Dey	18	21	16
(Finland) H Aarnio	21	9	21

==== Section 6 ====
First round
(Sri Lanka) D Karunaratna	21	21
Q4	(Sweden) R Kuhl	8	13
(Austria) W Gnedt	14	10
13	(England) T Penty	21	21
(Germany) A Roovers	21	21
(France) T Rouxel	9	17
(Republic of Ireland) N Nguyen	21	18	21
4	(Spain) P Abian	19	21	19

Second round
(Sri Lanka) D Karunaratna	21	9	17
13	(England) T Penty	19	21	21
(Germany) A Roovers	18	12
(Republic of Ireland) N Nguyen	21	21

Third round
13	(England) T Penty	21	16	21
(Republic of Ireland) N Nguyen	11	21	15

==== Section 7 ====
First round
(Canada) J Ho-shue	21
PFQ	(England) V Rajendran	5^{r}
(France) L Claerbout	17	21	17
10	(Denmark) R Gemke	21	12	21
Q1	(England) A Marritt	15	11
(Republic of Ireland) J Magee	21	21
(Sweden) J Nilsson	18	21	21
7	(Russia) V Malkov	21	15	19

Second round
(Canada) J Ho-shue	13	19
10	(Denmark) R Gemke	21	21
(Republic of Ireland) J Magee	10	17
(Sweden) J Nilsson	21	21

Third round
10	(Denmark) R Gemke	21	21
(Sweden) J Nilsson	13	10

==== Section 8 ====
First round
Q2	(Scotland) C Grimley	17	14
(Ukraine) A Pochtarov	21	21
PFQ	(Sweden) D Lidman	18	16
15	(Finland) K Koljonen	21	21
PFQ	(England) H L Ngan	17	19
(Croatia) Z Durkinjak	21	21
(Scotland) M Carder	17	11
2	(Brazil) Y Coelho	21	21

Second round
(Ukraine) A Pochtarov	12	16
15	(Finland) K Koljonen	21	21
(Croatia) Z Durkinjak	21	12	21
2	(Brazil) Y Coelho	17	21	23

Third round
15	(Finland) K Koljonen	19	13
2	(Brazil) Y Coelho	21	21

== Women's singles ==
=== Seeds ===
1. (Scotland) Kirsty Gilmour (champion)
2. (Spain) Beatriz Corrales (semifinals)
3. (Denmark) Mia Blichfeldt (final)
4. (Bulgaria) Linda Zetchiri (quarterfinals)
5. (Denmark) Natalia Koch Rohde (quarterfinals)
6. (Canada) Rachel Honderich (second round)
7. (Denmark) Sofie Holmboe Dahl (second round)
8. (Russia) Natalia Perminova (quarterfinals)

=== Finals ===
Semifinals
1	(Scotland) Kirsty Gilmour	21	21
PFQ	(Netherlands) Soraya De Visch Eijbergen	15	17
3	(Denmark) Mia Blichfeldt	21	21
2	(Spain) Beatriz Corrales	15	15

Final
1	(Scotland) Kirsty Gilmour	23	21
3	(Denmark) Mia Blichfeldt	21	12

=== Top half ===
==== Section 1 ====
First round
1	(Scotland) K Gilmour	21	21
(France) D Lansac	16	9
(England) C Birch	21	23
Q1	(Republic of Ireland) R Darragh	14	21
5	(Denmark) N K Rohde	22	21	21
(Spain) C Azurmendi	24	13	19
(Wales) J Hart	15	21	21
PFQ	(Switzerland) C Hantz	21	16	18

Second round
1	(Scotland) K Gilmour	21	21
(England) C Birch	15	13
5	(Denmark) N K Rohde	21	21
(Wales) J Hart	16	13

Quarterfinals
1	(Scotland) K Gilmour	21	16	21
5	(Denmark) N K Rohde	12	21	19

==== Section 2 ====
First round
4	(Bulgaria) L Zetchiri	21	21
(Denmark) J D Jakobsen	13	8
Q2	(United States) J Gai	17	14
(United States) J Subandhi	21	21
7	(Denmark) S H Dahl	21	21
(Estonia) G Saar	14	12
PFQ	(Netherlands) S Eijbergen	18	21	21
PFQ	(China) Qi XF	21	15	16

Second round
4	(Bulgaria) L Zetchiri	21	21
(United States) J Subandhi	19	13
7	(Denmark) S H Dahl	14	16
PFQ	(Netherlands) S Eijbergen	21	21

Quarterfinals
4	(Bulgaria) L Zetchiri	21	12	16
PFQ	(Netherlands) S Eijbergen	17	21	21

=== Bottom half ===
==== Section 3 ====
First round
(India) T Lad	21	21
(Czech Republic) K Tomalová	16	14
(Germany) Y Li	21	14	19
6	(Canada) R Honderich	18	21	21
(Ukraine) N Voytsekh	21	16	15
(England) F M Wright	16	21	21
(Belgium) L Tan	16	8
3	(Denmark) M Blichfeldt	21	21

Second round
(India) T Lad	21	12	21
6	(Canada) R Honderich	18	21	16
(England) F M Wright	14	18
3	(Denmark) M Blichfeldt	21	21

Quarterfinals
(India) T Lad	19	10
3	(Denmark) M Blichfeldt	21	21

==== Section 4 ====
First round
(Denmark) I A Andersen	21	21
Q3	(Denmark) F Ravn	15	19
(India) S Rane	17	21	15
8	(Russia) N Perminova	21	17	21
(England) G Bland	11	13
(Netherlands) G Mahulette	21	21
Q4	(United States) J Hsu	13	18
2	(Spain) B Corrales	21	21

Second round
(Denmark) I A Andersen	19	19
8	(Russia) N Perminova	21	21
(Netherlands) G Mahulette	20	16
2	(Spain) B Corrales	22	21

Quarterfinals
8	(Russia) N Perminova	17	13
2	(Spain) B Corrales	21	21

== Men's doubles ==
=== Seeds ===
1. (England) Marcus Ellis / Chris Langridge (second round)
2. (Germany) Jones Ralfy Jansen / Josche Zurwonne (quarterfinals)
3. (England) Peter Briggs / Tom Wolfenden (second round)
4. (Denmark) Frederik Colberg / Rasmus Fladberg (quarterfinals)
5. (Canada) Jason Anthony Ho-Shue / Nyl Yakura (quarterfinals)
6. (Russia) Konstantin Abramov / Alexandr Zinchenko (second round)
7. (Netherlands) Jelle Maas / Robin Tabeling (champions)
8. (Netherlands) Jacco Arends / Ruben Jille (final)

=== Finals ===
Semifinals
(France) Bastian Kersaudy (France) Julien Maio	21	13	18
8	(Netherlands) Jacco Arends (Netherlands) Ruben Jille	18	21	21
7	(Netherlands) Jelle Maas (Netherlands) Robin Tabeling	21	21
(England) Ben Lane (England) Sean Vendy	13	18

Final
8	(Netherlands) Jacco Arends (Netherlands) Ruben Jille	11	15
7	(Netherlands) Jelle Maas (Netherlands) Robin Tabeling	21	21

=== Top half ===
==== Section 1 ====
First round
1	(England) M Ellis (England) C Langridge	21	21
(India) N Garg (India) A Mayekar	5	4
(Republic of Ireland) N Nguyen (Republic of Ireland) P Reynolds	17	17
(France) B Kersaudy (France) J Maio	21	21
5	(Canada) J Ho-shue (Canada) N Yakura	21	21
(England) R Golding (England) V Liew	12	17
(Scotland) C Grimley (Scotland) M Grimley	11	15
(Denmark) M Mikkelsen (Denmark) N Overgaard	21	21

Second round
1	(England) M Ellis (England) C Langridge	19	21	19
(France) B Kersaudy (France) J Maio	21	17	21
5	(Canada) J Ho-shue (Canada) N Yakura	9	21	21
(Denmark) M Mikkelsen (Denmark) N Overgaard	21	16	17

Quarterfinals
(France) B Kersaudy (France) J Maio	21	21
5	(Canada) J Ho-shue (Canada) N Yakura	14	5

==== Section 2 ====
First round
4	(Denmark) F Colberg (Denmark) R Fladberg	17	21	21
(Scotland) A Dunn (Scotland) A Hall	21	15	17
Q3	(England) A Marritt (England) N Rossiter	11	13
(England) Z Russ (England) S Stallwood	21	21
8	(Netherlands) J Arends (Netherlands) R Jille	18	21	21
PFQ	(England) G Mairs (England) S Parsons	21	15	8
PFQ	(Republic of Ireland) M Brady (Republic of Ireland) C Chambers	11	14
(England) F Akroum (England) M Roe	21	21

Second round
4	(Denmark) F Colberg (Denmark) R Fladberg	21	21
(England) Z Russ (England) S Stallwood	11	17
8	(Netherlands) J Arends (Netherlands) R Jille	21	21
(England) F Akroum (England) M Roe	10	9

Quarterfinals
4	(Denmark) F Colberg (Denmark) R Fladberg	18	19
8	(Netherlands) J Arends (Netherlands) R Jille	21	21

=== Bottom half ===
==== Section 3 ====
First round
(Finland) H Aarnio (Finland) I Heino	9	16
(Denmark) M Bay-Smidt (Denmark) F Søgaard	21	21
(India) S Sipani (England) Wang YH
7	(Netherlands) J Maas (Netherlands) R Tabeling	w	/	o
(Scotland) M Campbell (Scotland) P Machugh	20	17
(New Zealand) O Leydon-Davis (Denmark) L Molhede	22	21
(Malaysia) Chen J H (Malaysia) Yeoh S Z	14	14
3	(England) P Briggs (England) T Wolfenden	21	21

Second round
(Denmark) M Bay-Smidt (Denmark) F Søgaard	15	17
7	(Netherlands) J Maas (Netherlands) R Tabeling	21	21
(New Zealand) O Leydon-Davis (Denmark) L Molhede	21	23	21
3	(England) P Briggs (England) T Wolfenden	13	25	16

Quarterfinals
7	(Netherlands) J Maas (Netherlands) R Tabeling	21	21
(New Zealand) O Leydon-Davis (Denmark) L Molhede	19	15

==== Section 4 ====
First round
(Republic of Ireland) J Magee (Republic of Ireland) S Magee	16	18
(England) B Lane (England) S Vendy	21	21
Q4	(Malaysia) Alfred Lau Y L (Malaysia) Adam Lau Y L	11	17
6	(Russia) K Abramov (Russia) A Zinchenko	21	21
Q2	(Scotland) D Leinster (Scotland) S Stewart	20	19
Q1	(Sri Lanka) D Karunaratna (Sri Lanka) N Karunaratne	22	21
(England) M Clare (England) D King	10	16
2	(Germany) J R Jansen (Germany) J Zurwonne	21	21

Second round
(England) B Lane (England) S Vendy	21	21
6	(Russia) K Abramov (Russia) A Zinchenko	19	19
Q1	(Sri Lanka) D Karunaratna (Sri Lanka) N Karunaratne	10	17
2	(Germany) J R Jansen (Germany) J Zurwonne	21	21

Quarterfinals
(England) B Lane (England) S Vendy	21	18	21
2	(Germany) J R Jansen (Germany) J Zurwonne	15	21	16

== Women's doubles ==
=== Seeds ===
1. (Russia) Anastasia Chervyakova / Olga Morozova (semifinals)
2. (France) Emilie Lefel / Anne Tran (quarterfinals)
3. (England) Chloe Birch / Jessica Pugh (quarterfinals)
4. (England) Jenny Moore / Victoria Williams (second round)

=== Finals ===
Semifinals
1	(Russia) Anastasia Chervyakova (Russia) Olga Morozova	11	12
(Netherlands) Selena Piek (Netherlands) Cheryl Seinen	21	21
(Denmark) Amalie Magelund (Denmark) Freja Ravn	19	12
(Russia) Ekaterina Bolotova (Russia) Alina Davletova	21	21

Final
(Netherlands) Selena Piek (Netherlands) Cheryl Seinen	15	21	21
(Russia) Ekaterina Bolotova (Russia) Alina Davletova	21	15	11

=== Top half ===
==== Section 1 ====
First round
1	(Russia) A Chervyakova (Russia) O Morozova
BYE
(England) E Burbidge (India) T Lad	21	21
(England) A Oprisan (England) G Randhawa	13	14
(Switzerland) N Fankhauser (Netherlands) I Tabeling
BYE
(Denmark) M Surrow (Denmark) J Van Zaane	21	21
(England) P Butler (England) G Whiting	12	13

Second round
1	(Russia) A Chervyakova (Russia) O Morozova	25	21
(England) E Burbidge (India) T Lad	23	14
(Switzerland) N Fankhauser (Netherlands) I Tabeling	21	21
(Denmark) M Surrow (Denmark) J Van Zaane	8	9

Quarterfinals
1	(Russia) A Chervyakova (Russia) O Morozova	21	21
(Switzerland) N Fankhauser (Netherlands) I Tabeling	13	14

==== Section 2 ====
First round
4	(England) J Moore (England) V Williams
BYE
(Netherlands) S Piek (Netherlands) C Seinen	21	21
(Scotland) L Middleton (Scotland) S Sidebottom	11	11
(Denmark) J D Jakobsen (Denmark) D Søby
BYE
(England) J Hopton (England) L Tolman	17	22
(Republic of Ireland) S Boyle (Republic of Ireland) R Darragh	21	24

Second round
4	(England) J Moore (England) V Williams	18	18
(Netherlands) S Piek (Netherlands) C Seinen	21	21
(Denmark) J D Jakobsen (Denmark) D Søby	21	21
(Republic of Ireland) S Boyle (Republic of Ireland) R Darragh	12	14

Quarterfinals
(Netherlands) S Piek (Netherlands) C Seinen	21	21
(Denmark) J D Jakobsen (Denmark) D Søby	19	12

=== Bottom half ===
==== Section 3 ====
First round
(Czech Republic) A Basova (Czech Republic) M Fuchsova	21	21
(England) K H Clague (England) C E Marritt	15	14
BYE
(Denmark) A Magelund (Denmark) F Ravn
(Sweden) A Hogstrom (Sweden) C Nistad	18	21	13
(Scotland) J MacPherson (Scotland) E O'Donnell	21	16	21
BYE
3	(England) C Birch (England) J Pugh

Second round
(Czech Republic) A Basova (Czech Republic) M Fuchsova	12	16
(Denmark) A Magelund (Denmark) F Ravn	21	21
(Scotland) J MacPherson (Scotland) E O'Donnell	17	11
3	(England) C Birch (England) J Pugh	21	21

Quarterfinals
(Denmark) A Magelund (Denmark) F Ravn	21	21
3	(England) C Birch (England) J Pugh	12	17

==== Section 4 ====
First round
(Malaysia) L Cheah (Malaysia) Yang L L	12	14
(Russia) E Bolotova (Russia) A Davletova	21	21
BYE
(England) Z King (England) B Miller
(England) N Gresty (England) T Shaw	21	21
(Scotland) B Grodynska (England) E Robinson	11	14
BYE
2	(France) E Lefel (France) A Tran

Second round
(Russia) E Bolotova (Russia) A Davletova	21	21
(England) Z King (England) B Miller	9	11
(England) N Gresty (England) T Shaw	9	14
2	(France) E Lefel (France) A Tran	21	21

Quarterfinals
(Russia) E Bolotova (Russia) A Davletova	21	21
2	(France) E Lefel (France) A Tran	17	13

== Mixed doubles ==
=== Seeds ===
1. (Republic of Ireland) Sam Magee / Chloe Magee (quarterfinals)
2. (France) Ronan Labar / Audrey Fontaine (withdrew)
3. (England) Ben Lane / Jessica Pugh (second round)
4. (Denmark) Mikkel Mikkelsen / Mai Surrow (final)
5. (England) Marcus Ellis / Lauren Smith (withdrew)
6. (Netherlands) Jacco Arends / Selena Piek (champions)
7. (Netherlands) Robin Tabeling / Cheryl Seinen (semifinals)
8. (France) Bastian Kersaudy / Lea Palermo (quarterfinals)

=== Finals ===
Semifinals
6	(Netherlands) Jacco Arends (Netherlands) Selena Piek	16	21	21
(Netherlands) Jelle Maas (Netherlands) Imke van der Aar	21	11	13
4	(Denmark) Mikkel Mikkelsen (Denmark) Mai Surrow	21	20	22
7	(Netherlands) Robin Tabeling (Netherlands) Cheryl Seinen	16	22	20

Final
6	(Netherlands) Jacco Arends (Netherlands) Selena Piek	21	21
4	(Denmark) Mikkel Mikkelsen (Denmark) Mai Surrow	10	10

=== Top half ===
==== Section 1 ====
First round
1	(Republic of Ireland) S Magee (Republic of Ireland) C Magee	21	21
(Scotland) A Dunn (Scotland) E O'Donnell	15	14
(England) M Clare (England) V Williams	21	21	21
Q2	(Republic of Ireland) P Reynolds (Republic of Ireland) R Darragh	23	17	17
6	(Netherlands) J Arends (Netherlands) S Piek	21	17	21
(Sweden) R Eidestedt (Sweden) C Nistad	14	21	19
Q4	(Scotland) C Pringle (Scotland) C Pringle	21	21
PFQ	(England) A Cook (England) Z King	15	15

Second round
1	(Republic of Ireland) S Magee (Republic of Ireland) C Magee	21	21
(England) M Clare (England) V Williams	16	15
6	(Netherlands) J Arends (Netherlands) S Piek	21	21
Q4	(Scotland) C Pringle (Scotland) C Pringle	15	8

Quarterfinals
1	(Republic of Ireland) S Magee (Republic of Ireland) C Magee	19	14
6	(Netherlands) J Arends (Netherlands) S Piek	21	21

==== Section 2 ====
First round
3	(England) B Lane (England) J Pugh	21	21
(Switzerland) O Schaller (Switzerland) C Burkart	7	13
(Netherlands) J Maas (Netherlands) I Van Der Aar	21	21
(Denmark) M B-Smidt (Denmark) A Bøje	17	16
8	(France) B Kersaudy (France) L Palermo	21	21
(Russia) A Zinchenko (Russia) O Morozova	15	17
(Bulgaria) A Vlaar (Netherlands) I Tabeling	21	21
(England) S Stallwood (England) E Burbidge	11	16

Second round
3	(England) B Lane (England) J Pugh	21	16	18
(Netherlands) J Maas (Netherlands) I Van Der Aar	19	21	21
8	(France) B Kersaudy (France) L Palermo	21	21
(Bulgaria) A Vlaar (Netherlands) I Tabeling	16	18

Quarterfinals
(Netherlands) J Maas (Netherlands) I Van Der Aar	21	21
8	(France) B Kersaudy (France) L Palermo	19	14

=== Bottom half ===
==== Section 3 ====
First round
Q1	(England) M Roe (England) J Hopton	9	15
(Czech Republic) J Bitman (Czech Republic) A Basova	21	21
PFQ	(Germany) J R Jansen (Germany) E Janssens
PFQ	(England) M Flynn (England) L Tolman	w	/	o
Q3	(Ukraine) A Pochtarov (Ukraine) N Voytsekh	18	16
PFQ	(Denmark) F Søgaard (Denmark) A Magelund	21	21
(France) J Maio (France) A Tran	19	21	17
4	(Denmark) M Mikkelsen (Denmark) M Surrow	21	15	21

Second round
(Czech Republic) J Bitman (Czech Republic) A Basova	15	19
PFQ	(England) M Flynn (England) L Tolman	21	21
PFQ	(Denmark) F Søgaard (Denmark) A Magelund	16	18
4	(Denmark) M Mikkelsen (Denmark) M Surrow	21	21

Quarterfinals
PFQ	(England) M Flynn (England) L Tolman	15	12
4	(Denmark) M Mikkelsen (Denmark) M Surrow	21	21

==== Section 4 ====
First round
(Scotland) M Campbell (Scotland) J MacPherson	6	18
PFQ	(Scotland) A Hall (Scotland) C Torrance	21	21
(Australia) HD Tang (Scotland) B Grodynska	12	9
7	(Netherlands) R Tabeling (Netherlands) C Seinen	21	21
(England) G Mairs (England) J Moore	16	21	21
(Finland) A Kaisti (Finland) J Nyström	21	17	12
(Russia) R Alimov (Russia) A Davletova	21	21
PFQ	(Republic of Ireland) C Chambers (Republic of Ireland) S Chambers	8	9

Second round
PFQ	(Scotland) A Hall (Scotland) C Torrance	16	21	18
7	(Netherlands) R Tabeling (Netherlands) C Seinen	21	18	21
(England) G Mairs (England) J Moore	14	21	21
(Russia) R Alimov (Russia) A Davletova	21	19	15

Quarterfinals
7	(Netherlands) R Tabeling (Netherlands) C Seinen	21	21
(England) G Mairs (England) J Moore	16	14

Preceded by 2017 Macau Open Grand Prix Gold	BWF Grand Prix Gold and Grand Prix; 2017 BWF Season	Succeeded by 2017 Korea Masters Grand Prix Gold
Preceded by 2016 Scottish Open Grand Prix	Scottish Open Grand Prix	Succeeded by 2018 Scottish Open
