= 2018 Russian Open (badminton) =

Tournament details
- Dates: 24–29 July
- Level: Super 100
- Total prize money: US$75,000
- Venue: Sport Hall Olympic
- Location: Vladivostok, Russia

Champions
- Men's singles: (India) Sourabh Verma
- Women's singles: (Malaysia) Ho Yen Mei
- Men's doubles: (Malaysia) Mohamad Arif Abdul Latif (Malaysia) Nur Mohd Azriyn Ayub
- Women's doubles: (Japan) Chisato Hoshi (Japan) Kie Nakanishi
- Mixed doubles: (Russia) Vladimir Ivanov (South Korea) Kim Min-kyung

The 2018 Russian Open was a badminton tournament which took place at Sport Hall Olympic in Vladivostok, Russia, from 24 to 29 July 2018 and had a total purse of $75,000.

== Tournament ==
The 2018 Russian Open was the fifth Super 100 tournament of the 2018 BWF World Tour and also part of the Russian Open championships which had been held since 1992. This tournament was organized by the National Badminton Federation of Russia with the sanction from the BWF.

=== Venue ===
This international tournament was held at Sport Hall Olympic in Vladivostok, Primorsky Krai, Far Eastern Federal District, Russia.

=== Point distribution ===
Below is the point distribution table for each phase of the tournament based on the BWF points system for the BWF Tour Super 100 event.

Winner	Runner-up	3/4	5/8	9/16	17/32	33/64
5,500	4,680	3,850	3,030	2,110	1,290	510

=== Prize money ===
The total prize money for this tournament was US$75,000. Distribution of prize money was in accordance with BWF regulations.

Event	Winner	Finals	Semi-finals	Quarter-finals	Last 16
Singles	$5,625	$2,850	$1,087.50	$450	$262.50
Doubles	$5,925	$2,850	$1,050	$543.75	$281.25

== Men's singles ==
=== Seeds ===
1. (Spain) Pablo Abián (third round)
2. (Russia) Vladimir Malkov (semi-finals)
3. (Israel) Misha Zilberman (quarter-finals)
4. (India) Parupalli Kashyap (second round)
5. (India) Subhankar Dey (quarter-finals)
6. (Thailand) Pannawit Thongnuam (withdrew)
7. (Finland) Kalle Koljonen (third round)
8. (India) Sourabh Verma (champion)

=== Finals ===
Semi-finals
(India) Mithun Manjunath	9	15
8	(India) Sourabh Verma	21	21
(Japan) Koki Watanabe	21	21
2	(Russia) Vladimir Malkov	12	16

Final
8	(India) Sourabh Verma	18	21	21
(Japan) Koki Watanabe	21	12	17

=== Top half ===
==== Section 1 ====
First Round
(Russia) D Riabov	21	21
(England) H S Wong	10	16
(Belgium) E Bracke	14	13
(India) M Manjunath	21	21
(Hungary) G Krausz	14	14
(Japan) K Naito	21	21

Second Round
1	(Spain) P Abián	21	16	21
(India) C Sen	14	21	16
(Malaysia) S Ramachandran	21	16	24
(Russia) D Riabov	9	21	22
6	(Thailand) P Thongnuam
(India) M Manjunath	w	/	o
(Russia) E Kurdyukov	12	11
(Japan) K Naito	21	21

Third Round
1	(Spain) P Abián	12	21	16
(Malaysia) S Ramachandran	21	14	21
(India) M Manjunath	21	21
(Japan) K Naito	16	13

Quarter-finals
(Malaysia) S Ramachandran	18	12
(India) M Manjunath	21	21

==== Section 2 ====
First Round
(Canada) J Lam	11	8
(India) P Joshi	21	21
(Austria) L Wraber	21	21
(Russia) A Panov	2	6
(Russia) M Makalov	11	10
(India) R Y Chittaboina	21	21
(Finland) E Heino	17	21	14
(Russia) S Sirant	21	15	21

Second Round
3	(Israel) M Zilberman	21	18	21
(India) P Joshi	12	21	13
(Russia) P Kotsarenko	12	16
(Austria) L Wraber	21	21
8	(India) S Verma	23	21
(India) R Y Chittaboina	21	11
(Malaysia) Chong Y H
(Russia) S Sirant	w	/	o

Third Round
3	(Israel) M Zilberman	21	21
(Austria) L Wraber	14	18
8	(India) S Verma	21	21
(Russia) S Sirant	11	9

Quarter-finals
3	(Israel) M Zilberman	14	16
8	(India) S Verma	21	21

=== Bottom half ===
==== Section 3 ====
First Round
(Malaysia) Sim F H	11	15
(Japan) K Watanabe	21	21
(Russia) I Goncharov	18	21	17
(England) K L Chun	21	9	21
(England) F M Hassan	15	13
(Russia) I Kamyshenkov	21	21
(Malaysia) Soo T Z
(Japan) R Maruo	w	/	o

Second Round
(Japan) K Watanabe	21	21
(Russia) M Manuylov	5	3
(England) K L Chun	6	7
7	(Finland) K Koljonen	21	21
(Russia) I Kamyshenkov	21	8	10
(Russia) V Nikulov	10	21	21
(Japan) R Maruo	21	21
4	(India) Parupalli K	12	11

Third Round
(Japan) K Watanabe	21	21
7	(Finland) K Koljonen	15	10
(Russia) V Nikulov	9	7
(Japan) R Maruo	21	21

Quarter-finals
(Japan) K Watanabe	21	21
(Japan) R Maruo	15	10

==== Section 4 ====
First Round
(India) S P Singh	21	21
(Malaysia) Tan J W	17	16
(Canada) XD Sheng	14	8
(India) A Jayaram	21	21
(England) Wang YH	21	21
(Russia) A Serpionov	6	8

Second Round
(India) S P Singh	21	21
(India) B Joshi	8	14
(India) A Jayaram	21	14	15
5	(India) S Dey	15	21	21
(England) Wang YH	21	21
(Russia) N Fedotovskikh	17	9
(India) G Dutt	14	8
2	(Russia) V Malkov	21	21

Third Round
(India) S P Singh	11	19
5	(India) S Dey	21	21
(England) Wang YH	9	10
2	(Russia) V Malkov	21	21

Quarter-finals
5	(India) S Dey	20	15
2	(Russia) V Malkov	22	21

== Women's singles ==
=== Seeds ===
1. (Russia) Evgeniya Kosetskaya (first round)
2. (Malaysia) Lee Ying Ying (second round)
3. (Russia) Natalia Perminova (first round)
4. (Germany) Yvonne Li (semi-finals)
5. (Malaysia) Kisona Selvaduray (withdrew)
6. (India) Sri Krishna Priya Kudaravalli (withdrew)
7. (India) Mugdha Agrey (second round)
8. (Estonia) Kristin Kuuba (quarter-finals)

=== Finals ===
Semi-finals
(Malaysia) Ho Yen Mei	21	21
4	(Germany) Yvonne Li	17	15
PFQ	(Japan) Shiori Ebihara	21	19	22
Q3	(United States) Iris Wang	16	21	20

Final
(Malaysia) Ho Yen Mei	22	11	21
PFQ	(Japan) Shiori Ebihara	20	21	18

=== Top half ===
==== Section 1 ====
First Round
1	(Russia) E Kosetskaya	11	14
(Malaysia) Ho Y M	21	21
(Belgium) L Tan	23	21
(United States) C Pan	21	17
PFQ	(South Korea) Lee B-l	14	21	21
(India) S U R Chukka	21	15	18
(Russia) E Komendrovskaja	11	16
(India) V Gummadi	21	21

Second Round
(Malaysia) Ho Y M	21	21
(Belgium) L Tan	17	17
PFQ	(South Korea) Lee B-l	11	13
(India) V Gummadi	21	21

Quarter-finals
(Malaysia) Ho Y M	21	21
(India) V Gummadi	9	11

==== Section 2 ====
First Round
4	(Germany) Y Li	21	21
(Russia) V Vorobeva	19	8
(Malaysia) Thinnah M	26	24
Q4	(South Korea) Park S-e	24	22
8	(Estonia) K Kuuba	21	21
(India) V Choudhari	13	15
(Estonia) K-K Marran	21	22
(Russia) E Tarasova	16	20

Second Round
4	(Germany) Y Li	21	20	21
(Malaysia) Thinnah M	14	22	9
8	(Estonia) K Kuuba	21	21
(Estonia) K-K Marran	7	12

Quarter-finals
4	(Germany) Y Li	22	21
8	(Estonia) K Kuuba	20	12

=== Bottom half ===
==== Section 3 ====
First Round
Q1	(Japan) K Nakanishi	21	21
(Russia) E Pyatina	10	19
(Hong Kong) Deng X	21	21
PFQ	(Russia) D Radchenko	10	10
(Russia) A Semenova	9	7
Q2	(Japan) M Hayashi	21	21
PFQ	(Japan) S Ebihara	21	21
3	(Russia) N Perminova	11	14

Second Round
Q1	(Japan) K Nakanishi	11	13
(Hong Kong) Deng X	21	21
Q2	(Japan) M Hayashi	16	13
PFQ	(Japan) S Ebihara	21	21

Quarter-finals
(Hong Kong) Deng X	17	19
PFQ	(Japan) S Ebihara	21	21

==== Section 4 ====
First Round
Q3	(United States) I Wang	21	21
(Russia) O Arkhangelskaya	4	9
(Malaysia) Lim Y F	16	19
7	(India) M Agrey	21	21
(India) R Das	21	21
(Russia) V Slobodyanyuk	11	18
(Russia) A Pustinskaia	4	11
2	(Malaysia) Lee Y Y	21	21

Second Round
Q3	(United States) I Wang	21	21
7	(India) M Agrey	4	13
(India) R Das	13	21	21
2	(Malaysia) Lee Y Y	21	17	19

Quarter-finals
Q3	(United States) I Wang	21	21
(India) R Das	17	13

== Men's doubles ==
=== Seeds ===
1. (Russia) Vladimir Ivanov / Ivan Sozonov (semi-finals)
2. (Russia) Konstantin Abramov / Alexandr Zinchenko (final)
3. (Malaysia) Shia Chun Kang / Tan Wee Gieen (withdrew)
4. (India) Tarun Kona / Saurabh Sharma (withdrew)

=== Finals ===
Semi-finals
1	(Russia) Vladimir Ivanov (Russia) Ivan Sozonov	21	19	19
(Malaysia) Mohamad Arif Abdul Latif (Malaysia) Nur Mohd Azriyn Ayub	16	21	21
(India) Arun George (India) Sanyam Shukla	15	19
2	(Russia) Konstantin Abramov (Russia) Alexandr Zinchenko	21	21

Final
(Malaysia) Mohamad Arif Abdul Latif (Malaysia) Nur Mohd Azriyn Ayub	w	/	o
2	(Russia) Konstantin Abramov (Russia) Alexandr Zinchenko

=== Top half ===
==== Section 1 ====
First Round
(Russia) A Loginov (Russia) D Riabov	13	12
(Japan) M Takano (Japan) Y Tsukamoto	21	21

Second Round
1	(Russia) V Ivanov (Russia) I Sozonov	21	21
(Russia) I Kamyshenkov (Russia) M Manuylov	8	1
(Malaysia) Low H Y (Malaysia) Ng E C	17	16
(Japan) M Takano (Japan) Y Tsukamoto	21	21

Quarter-finals
1	(Russia) V Ivanov (Russia) I Sozonov	21	21
(Japan) M Takano (Japan) Y Tsukamoto	9	17

==== Section 2 ====
First Round
(Japan) K Higashino (Japan) D Watanabe	29	16
(Russia) R Alimov (Russia) R Kargaev	30	21

Second Round
3	(Malaysia) Shia C K (Malaysia) Tan W G
(Russia) D Grachev (Russia) P Kotsarenko	w	/	o
(Malaysia) M Arif A L (Malaysia) N M Azriyn A	21	21
(Russia) R Alimov (Russia) R Kargaev	17	10

Quarter-finals
(Russia) D Grachev (Russia) P Kotsarenko	17	18
(Malaysia) M Arif A L (Malaysia) N M Azriyn A	21	21

=== Bottom half ===
==== Section 3 ====
First Round
(India) A George (India) S Shukla	21	21
(Russia) V Nikulov (Russia) A Serpionov	15	15

Second Round
(India) A George (India) S Shukla	21	21
(Canada) J Tam (England) Wong H S	12	13
(Malaysia) A Chia (Malaysia) Soh W Y	w	/	o
4	(India) T Kona (India) S Sharma	w	/	o

Quarter-finals
(India) A George (India) S Shukla	w	/	o

==== Section 4 ====
First Round
(England) F M Hassan (England) C Kar Lung	7	7
(Japan) K Matsui (Japan) Y Takeuchi	21	21

Second Round
(Japan) K Matsui (Japan) Y Takeuchi	21	21
(Russia) I Goncharov (Russia) M Makalov	7	7
(Russia) N Khakimov (Russia) A Parakhodin	14	29
2	(Russia) K Abramov (Russia) A Zinchenko	21	30

Quarter-finals
(Japan) K Matsui (Japan) Y Takeuchi	22	23	19
2	(Russia) K Abramov (Russia) A Zinchenko	24	21	21

== Women's doubles ==
=== Seeds ===
1. (Malaysia) Chow Mei Kuan / Lee Meng Yean (final)
2. (Russia) Ekaterina Bolotova / Alina Davletova (quarter-finals)

=== Finals ===
Semi-finals
1	(Malaysia) Chow Mei Kuan (Malaysia) Lee Meng Yean	21	23
(Malaysia) Lim Chiew Sien (Malaysia) Tan Sueh Jeou	19	21
(Japan) Chisato Hoshi (Japan) Kie Nakanishi	22	21
(Japan) Akane Araki (Japan) Riko Imai	20	14

Final
1	(Malaysia) Chow Mei Kuan (Malaysia) Lee Meng Yean	11	18
(Japan) Chisato Hoshi (Japan) Kie Nakanishi	21	21

=== Top half ===
First Round
(Malaysia) V Hoo K M (Malaysia) Woon K W
(Russia) E Komendrovskaja (Russia) M Shegurova	w	/	o
(Malaysia) Lim C S (Malaysia) Tan S J	21	10	21
(Russia) O Morozova (Russia) V Vorobeva	17	21	17
(South Korea) Kim M-k (South Korea) Lim S-b	21	21
(Russia) O Arkhangelskaya (Russia) E Tarasova	6	10

Quarter-finals
1	(Malaysia) Chow M K (Malaysia) Lee M Y	21	21
(Russia) E Komendrovskaja (Russia) M Shegurova	16	11
(Malaysia) Lim C S (Malaysia) Tan S J	21	21
(South Korea) Kim M-k (South Korea) Lim S-b	14	17

Semi-finals
1	(Malaysia) Chow M K (Malaysia) Lee M Y	21	23
(Malaysia) Lim C S (Malaysia) Tan S J	19	21

=== Bottom half ===
First Round
(Japan) C Hoshi (Japan) K Nakanishi	21	21
(Russia) A Pustinskaia (Russia) E Pyatina	5	8
(South Korea) Lee J-h (South Korea) Park S-e	15	21	18
(Estonia) K Kuuba (Estonia) K-K Marran	21	16	21
(Japan) A Araki (Japan) R Imai	21	21
(Russia) I Budarina (Russia) E Riazantceva	8	7
(South Korea) Kang C-h (South Korea) Lee B-l	10	12
2	(Russia) E Bolotova (Russia) A Davletova	21	21

Quarter-finals
(Japan) C Hoshi (Japan) K Nakanishi	21	16	21
(Estonia) K Kuuba (Estonia) K-K Marran	14	21	10
(Japan) A Araki (Japan) R Imai	21	19	21
2	(Russia) E Bolotova (Russia) A Davletova	15	21	17

Semi-finals
(Japan) C Hoshi (Japan) K Nakanishi	22	21
(Japan) A Araki (Japan) R Imai	20	14

== Mixed doubles ==
=== Seeds ===
1. (Russia) Evgenij Dremin / Evgenia Dimova (semi-finals)
2. (India) Rohan Kapoor / Kuhoo Garg (final)
3. (India) Saurabh Sharma / Anoushka Parikh (quarter-finals)
4. (Russia) Rodion Alimov / Alina Davletova (second round)

=== Finals ===
Semi-finals
1	(Russia) Evgenij Dremin (Russia) Evgenia Dimova	18	15
(Russia) Vladimir Ivanov (South Korea) Kim Min-kyung	21	21
(Malaysia) Chen Tang Jie (Malaysia) Peck Yen Wei	19	21	20
2	(India) Rohan Kapoor (India) Kuhoo Garg	21	11	22

Final
(Russia) Vladimir Ivanov (South Korea) Kim Min-kyung	21	21
2	(India) Rohan Kapoor (India) Kuhoo Garg	19	17

=== Top half ===
==== Section 1 ====
First Round	Second Round					Quarter-finals
	1	(Russia) E Dremin (Russia) E Dimova	21	21	21
		(Russia) V Nikulov (Russia) A Semenova	23	12	13
						1	(Russia) E Dremin (Russia) E Dimova	22	21
							(Russia) A Zinchenko (Russia) O Morozova	20	14
	(Russia) A Zinchenko (Russia) O Morozova		21	21
	(Russia) M Manuylov (Russia) M Dremina		8	6

==== Section 2 ====
First Round
(Russia) V Ivanov (South Korea) Kim M-k	20	21	21
(Russia) D Riabov (Russia) M Shegurova	22	11	15

Second Round
4	(Russia) R Alimov (Russia) A Davletova	19	19
(Malaysia) Hoo P R (Malaysia) Cheah Y S	21	21
(Russia) D Grachev (Russia) E Bolotova	13	13
(Russia) V Ivanov (South Korea) Kim M-k	21	21

Quarter-finals
(Malaysia) Hoo P R (Malaysia) Cheah Y S	13	20
(Russia) V Ivanov (South Korea) Kim M-k	21	22

=== Bottom half ===
==== Section 3 ====
First Round
(Malaysia) Chen T J (Malaysia) Peck Y W	16	21	21
(Russia) R Kargaev (Russia) V Vorobeva	21	12	11

Second Round
(Malaysia) Chen T J (Malaysia) Peck Y W	21	21
(Russia) I Goncharov (Russia) I Budarina	2	7
(Russia) A Serpionov (Russia) A Pustinskaia	6	12
3	(India) S Sharma (India) A Parikh	21	21

Quarter-finals
(Malaysia) Chen T J (Malaysia) Peck Y W	21	21
3	(India) S Sharma (India) A Parikh	15	8

==== Section 4 ====
First Round	Second Round					Quarter-finals
	(Russia) A Loginov (Russia) L Abibulaeva		21	19	21
	(Russia) M Makalov (Russia) E Riazantceva		14	21	15
							(Russia) A Loginov (Russia) L Abibulaeva	13	9
						2	(India) R Kapoor (India) K Garg	21	21
		(Russia) A Panov (Russia) P Makkoveeva	10	14
	2	(India) R Kapoor (India) K Garg	21	21

Preceded by 2018 Akita Masters	BWF World Tour; 2018 BWF season	Succeeded by 2018 Vietnam Open
