= Nicklas Mathiasen =

Danish badminton player (born 1991)

Personal information
- Born: 8 November 1991 (age 35)

Sport
- Country: Denmark
- Sport: Badminton

Men's singles & doubles
- Highest ranking: 810 (MS 24 April 2014); 153 (MD 3 December 2015); 290 (XD 29 September 2016)
- BWF profile

Nicklas Mathiasen (born 8 November 1991) is a Danish badminton player.

== Achievements ==
=== BWF International Challenge/Series ===
Men's doubles
Year	Tournament	Partner	Opponent	Score	Result
2015	Finnish International	(Denmark) Lasse Mølhede	(Russia) Nikita Khakimov (Russia) Vasily Kuznetsov	16–21, 21–9, 17–21	(silver) Runner-up
2018	Iceland International	(Denmark) Mikkel Stoffersen	(Scotland) Alexander Dunn (Scotland) Adam Hall	16–21, 18–21	(silver) Runner-up

Mixed doubles
Year	Tournament	Partner	Opponent	Score	Result
2014	Iceland International	(Denmark) Cecilie Bjergen	(Denmark) Alexander Bond (Denmark) Ditte Søby Hansen	9–21, 13–21	(silver) Runner-up
2015	Iceland International	(Denmark) Cecilie Bjergen	(Denmark) Lasse Mølhede (Denmark) Trine Villadsen	21–11, 21–15	(gold) Winner

BWF International Challenge tournament
BWF International Series tournament
BWF Future Series tournament
