= Trine Villadsen =

Danish badminton player (born 1995)

Personal information
- Born: 11 April 1995 (age 31)

Sport
- Country: Denmark
- Sport: Badminton

Women's singles & doubles
- Highest ranking: 323 (WS 19 November 2015); 217 (WD 19 November 2015); 444 (XD 27 August 2015)
- BWF profile

Trine Villadsen (born 11 April 1995) is a Danish badminton player.

== Achievements ==
=== BWF International Challenge/Series ===
Women's doubles

Year	Tournament	Partner	Opponent	Score	Result
2018	Iceland International	(Denmark) Emilie Furbo	(Scotland) Julie MacPherson (Scotland) Eleanor O'Donnell	21–17, 13–21, 17–21	(silver) Runner-up
2018	Polish International	(Denmark) Emilie Furbo	(Japan) Mamiko Ishibashi (Japan) Mirai Shinoda	20–22, 16–21	(silver) Runner-up

Mixed doubles

Year	Tournament	Partner	Opponent	Score	Result
2015	Iceland International	(Denmark) Lasse Mølhede	(Denmark) Nicklas Mathiasen (Denmark) Cecilie Bjergen	11–21, 15–21	(silver) Runner-up

BWF International Challenge tournament
BWF International Series tournament
BWF Future Series tournament
