= Jeppe Ludvigsen =

Danish badminton player (born 1989)

Personal information
- Born: 28 January 1989 (age 37)

Sport
- Country: Denmark
- Sport: Badminton

Men's & mixed doubles
- Highest ranking: 189 (MD 26 September 2013); 102 (XD 13 November 2014)
- BWF profile

Jeppe Ludvigsen (born 28 January 1989) is a Danish badminton coach and former player.

== Coaching career ==
Ludvigsen started coaching when he was 14 years old in his hometown and has since then taken the coaching job more and more seriously. After a 3-year stint as video analyst for Denmarks national team, he got his first national coaching job in Germany. His biggest accomplishments in Germany are leading the German doubles players to winning bronze in the mixed doubles at the 2022 World Championships in Tokyo as well as gold in both mixed and men's doubles at the 2022 European Championships.

After Olympics 2024, Ludvigsen became head doubles coach for France. In his first 12 months the mixed doubles Gicquel and Delrue won the 2025 Indonesia Open and a first ever bronze at the 2025 World Championships for a French doubles pair.

== Achievements ==
=== BWF International Challenge/Series ===
Mixed doubles
Year	Tournament	Partner	Opponent	Score	Result
2014	Portugal International	(Denmark) Mai Surrow	(Austria) Roman Zirnwald (Austria) Elisabeth Baldauf	19–21, 11–21	(silver) Runner-up
2014	Slovenian International	(Denmark) Mai Surrow	(Russia) Alexandr Zinchenko (Russia) Olga Morozova	13–21, 21–16, 21–15	(gold) Winner

BWF International Challenge tournament
BWF International Series tournament
BWF Future Series tournament
