= Lasse Mølhede =

Danish badminton player (born 1993)

Personal information
- Born: 25 October 1993 (age 33) Ikast, Denmark

Sport
- Country: Denmark
- Sport: Badminton

Men's & mixed doubles
- Highest ranking: 23 (MD with Jeppe Bay 11 October 2022); 69 (XD with Sara Lundgaard 15 January 2019)
- Current ranking: 44 (MD with Jeppe Bay 2 January 2024)
- BWF profile
Medal record
Men's badminton
Representing Denmark
Thomas Cup
Bronze medal – third place	2022 Bangkok	Men's team

Lasse Mølhede (born 25 October 1993) is a Danish badminton player.

== Achievements ==
=== BWF World Tour (1 title, 1 runner-up) ===
The BWF World Tour, which was announced on 19 March 2017 and implemented in 2018, is a series of elite badminton tournaments sanctioned by the Badminton World Federation (BWF). The BWF World Tour is divided into levels of World Tour Finals, Super 1000, Super 750, Super 500, Super 300 (part of the HSBC World Tour), and the BWF Tour Super 100.

Men's doubles
Year	Tournament	Level	Partner	Opponent	Score	Result
2019	SaarLorLux Open	Super 100	(Denmark) Mathias Bay-Smidt	(China) Di Zijian (China) Wang Chang	17–21, 15–21	(silver) Runner-up
2020	SaarLorLux Open	Super 100	(Denmark) Jeppe Bay	(Denmark) Daniel Lundgaard (Denmark) Mathias Thyrri	21–13, 21–15	(gold) Winner

=== BWF International Challenge/Series (5 titles, 5 runners-up) ===
Men's doubles
Year	Tournament	Partner	Opponent	Score	Result
2015	Finnish International	(Denmark) Nicklas Mathiasen	(Russia) Nikita Khakimov (Russia) Vasily Kuznetsov	16–21, 21–9, 17–21	(silver) Runner-up
2016	Norwegian International	(New Zealand) Oliver Leydon-Davis	(India) Akshay Dewalkar (India) Tarun Kona	21–18, 22–20	(gold) Winner
2017	Dutch International	(New Zealand) Oliver Leydon-Davis	(Netherlands) Jim Middelburg (Netherlands) Russell Muns	18–21, 21–10, 24–22	(gold) Winner
2018	Swedish Open	(New Zealand) Oliver Leydon-Davis	(Scotland) Martin Campbell (Scotland) Patrick Machugh	21–17, 21–12	(gold) Winner
2018	Austrian International	(New Zealand) Oliver Leydon-Davis	(Chinese Taipei) Lu Chen (Chinese Taipei) Ye Hong-wei	23–25, 17–21	(silver) Runner-up
2018	Italian International	(Denmark) Mathias Bay-Smidt	(Russia) Vitalij Durkin (Russia) Nikolai Ukk	21–11, 21–11	(gold) Winner
2019	Swedish Open	(Denmark) Mathias Bay-Smidt	(France) Bastian Kersaudy (France) Julien Maio	21–12, 21–15	(gold) Winner

Mixed doubles
Year	Tournament	Partner	Opponent	Score	Result
2015	Iceland International	(Denmark) Trine Villadsen	(Denmark) Nicklas Mathiasen (Denmark) Cecilie Bjergen	11–21, 15–21	(silver) Runner-up
2017	Norwegian International	(Denmark) Alexandra Bøje	(England) Gregory Mairs (England) Jenny Moore	11–21, 21–19, 11–21	(silver) Runner-up
2018	Austrian International	(Denmark) Sara Lundgaard	(Russia) Evgenij Dremin (Russia) Evgenia Dimova	15–21, 13–21	(silver) Runner-up

BWF International Challenge tournament
BWF International Series tournament
BWF Future Series tournament
