= Mai Surrow =

Danish badminton player (born 1992)

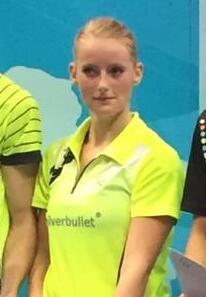
- Surrow at the 2017 Finnish Open

Personal information
- Born: 18 September 1992 (age 34) Randers, Denmark
- Height: 1.69 m (5 ft 7 in)

Sport
- Country: Denmark
- Sport: Badminton
- Handedness: Left

Women's & mixed doubles
- Highest ranking: 29 (WD with Julie Finne-Ipsen, 15 April 2025); 29 (XD with Mikkel Mikkelsen, 5 July 2018)
- BWF profile

Mai Surrow (born 18 September 1992) is a Danish badminton player. In 2016, she won the mixed doubles titles at the Portugal International tournament partnered with Mikkel Mikkelsen. In May 2016, she and Mikkelsen lifted their second title as a pair in only their fourth tournament together at the Slovenian International tournament.

== Achievements ==
=== BWF World Tour (1 runner-up) ===
The BWF World Tour, which was announced on 19 March 2017 and implemented in 2018, is a series of elite badminton tournaments sanctioned by the Badminton World Federation (BWF). The BWF World Tours are divided into levels of World Tour Finals, Super 1000, Super 750, Super 500, Super 300, and the BWF Tour Super 100.

Women's doubles
Year	Tournament	Level	Partner	Opponent	Score	Result
2023	Abu Dhabi Masters	Super 100	(Denmark) Julie Finne-Ipsen	(India) Tanisha Crasto (India) Ashwini Ponnappa	16–21, 21–16, 8–21	(silver) Runner-up

=== BWF Grand Prix (1 runner-up) ===
The BWF Grand Prix had two levels, the Grand Prix and Grand Prix Gold. It was a series of badminton tournaments sanctioned by the Badminton World Federation (BWF) and played between 2007 and 2017.

Mixed doubles
Year	Tournament	Partner	Opponent	Score	Result
2017	Scottish Open	(Denmark) Mikkel Mikkelsen	(Netherlands) Jacco Arends (Netherlands) Selena Piek	10–21, 10–21	(silver) Runner-up

BWF Grand Prix Gold tournament
BWF Grand Prix tournament

=== BWF International Challenge/Series (10 titles, 12 runners-up) ===
Women's doubles
Year	Tournament	Partner	Opponent	Score	Result
2017	Portugal International	(Denmark) Emilie Juul Møller	(Japan) Chisato Hoshi (Japan) Naru Shinoya	13–21, 6–21	(silver) Runner-up
2018	Italian International	(Denmark) Julie Finne-Ipsen	(Russia) Ekaterina Bolotova (Russia) Alina Davletova	13–21, 21–14, 13–21	(silver) Runner-up
2019	Estonian International	(Denmark) Julie Finne-Ipsen	(Russia) Anastasia Chervyakova (Russia) Olga Morozova	21–12, 17–21, 21–14	(gold) Winner
2019	Scottish Open	(Denmark) Julie Finne-Ipsen	(Denmark) Amalie Magelund (Denmark) Freja Ravn	21–17, 15–21, 6–21	(silver) Runner-up
2020	Swedish Open	(Denmark) Julie Finne-Ipsen	(France) Vimala Hériau (France) Margot Lambert	22–20, 22–20	(gold) Winner
2022	Austrian Open	(Denmark) Julie Finne-Ipsen	(Chinese Taipei) Lee Chia-hsin (Chinese Taipei) Teng Chun-hsun	19–21, 21–15, 10–21	(silver) Runner-up
2022	Nantes International	(Denmark) Julie Finne-Ipsen	(Chinese Taipei) Hsu Ya-ching (Chinese Taipei) Lin Wan-ching	24–22, 21–17	(gold) Winner
2023	Dutch Open	(Denmark) Julie Finne-Ipsen	(Netherlands) Debora Jille (Netherlands) Cheryl Seinen	9–21, 13–21	(silver) Runner-up

Mixed doubles
Year	Tournament	Partner	Opponent	Score	Result
2014	Portugal International	(Denmark) Jeppe Ludvigsen	(Austria) Roman Zirnwald (Austria) Elisabeth Baldauf	19–21, 11–21	(silver) Runner-up
2014	Croatian International	(Denmark) Mads Pedersen	(Denmark) Niclas Nøhr (Denmark) Sara Thygesen	15–21, 21–13, 18–21	(silver) Runner-up
2014	Slovenian International	(Denmark) Jeppe Ludvigsen	(Russia) Alexandr Zinchenko (Russia) Olga Morozova	13–21, 21–16, 21–15	(gold) Winner
2016	Portugal International	(Denmark) Mikkel Mikkelsen	(Vietnam) Đỗ Tuấn Đức (Vietnam) Phạm Như Thảo	21–19, 17–21, 21–19	(gold) Winner
2016	Slovenian International	(Denmark) Mikkel Mikkelsen	(Denmark) Steve Olesen (Denmark) Sara Lundgaard	21–9, 21–14	(gold) Winner
2016	Polish International	(Denmark) Mikkel Mikkelsen	(Poland) Paweł Pietryja (Poland) Aneta Wojtkowska	21–19, 21–12	(gold) Winner
2017	Swedish International	(Denmark) Mikkel Mikkelsen	(Denmark) Mathias Bay-Smidt (Denmark) Alexandra Bøje	21–18, 21–14	(gold) Winner
2017	Austrian Open	(Denmark) Mikkel Mikkelsen	(China) Gao Xiangcheng (China) Xia Chunyu	21–19, 17–21, 21–14	(gold) Winner
2017	Finnish Open	(Denmark) Mikkel Mikkelsen	(Chinese Taipei) Tseng Min-hao (Chinese Taipei) Hu Ling-fang	22–24, 16–21	(silver) Runner-up
2017	Slovenian International	(Denmark) Mikkel Mikkelsen	(England) Gregory Mairs (England) Jenny Moore	21–12, 21–13	(gold) Winner
2018	Spanish International	(Denmark) Mikkel Mikkelsen	(Russia) Evgenij Dremin (Russia) Evgenia Dimova	22–24, 12–21	(silver) Runner-up
2019	Swedish Open	(Denmark) Mikkel Mikkelsen	(Singapore) Danny Bawa Chrisnanta (Singapore) Tan Wei Han	14–21, 16–21	(silver) Runner-up
2020	Swedish Open	(Denmark) Mathias Thyrri	(Japan) Yujiro Nishikawa (Japan) Saori Ozaki	17–21, 11–21	(silver) Runner-up
2023	Swedish Open	(Denmark) Sebastian Bugtrup	(Indonesia) Jafar Hidayatullah (Indonesia) Aisyah Pranata	19–21, 21–19, 13–21	(silver) Runner-up

BWF International Challenge tournament
BWF International Series tournament
BWF Future Series tournament
