= Toby Penty =

English badminton player (born 1992)

Personal information
- Born: 12 August 1992 (age 34) Walton-on-Thames, England
- Years active: 2012–2022
- Height: 1.91 m (6 ft 3 in)

Sport
- Country: England
- Sport: Badminton
- Handedness: Left
- Coached by: Jakob Hoi; Stuart Wardell
- Retired: 6 September 2022

Men's singles
- Highest ranking: 43 (15 November 2018)
- BWF profile
Medal record
Men's badminton
Representing England
European Mixed Team Championships
Silver medal – second place	2015 Leuven	Mixed team
Bronze medal – third place	2013 Moscow	Mixed team
Bronze medal – third place	2017 Lubin	Mixed team
European Men's Team Championships
Silver medal – second place	2014 Basel	Men's team
Silver medal – second place	2018 Kazan	Men's team
Bronze medal – third place	2012 Amsterdam	Men's team
Bronze medal – third place	2016 Kazan	Men's team
Bronze medal – third place	2024 Łódź	Men's team

Toby Penty (born 12 August 1992) is a retired English badminton player. He started playing badminton at aged 9, and won U-19 English National Championships in 2011. In 2010, he won junior titles in the Netherlands and Switzerland. In 2017, he won the Swedish International tournament in the men's singles event.

Penty competed at the 2019 European Games, 2020 Olympic Games and at the 2022 Commonwealth Games.

Penty announced his retirement on 6 September 2022. The 2022 BWF World Championships was his last tournament.

== Personal life ==
Penty has lost all of his hair on his body since November 2018, and it was diagnosed as alopecia.

== Achievements ==
=== BWF Grand Prix (1 title) ===
The BWF Grand Prix had two levels, the Grand Prix and Grand Prix Gold. It was a series of badminton tournaments sanctioned by the Badminton World Federation (BWF) and played between 2007 and 2017.

Men's singles
Year	Tournament	Opponent	Score	Result
2017	Scottish Open	(France) Lucas Corvée	21–14, 24–22	(gold) Winner

BWF Grand Prix Gold tournament
BWF Grand Prix tournament

=== BWF International Challenge/Series (4 titles, 7 runners-up) ===
Men's singles
Year	Tournament	Opponent	Score	Result
2012	Polish International	(Scotland) Kieran Merrilees	12–21, 18–21	(silver) Runner-up
2012	Swiss International	(Germany) Dieter Domke	14–21, 22–20, 18–21	(silver) Runner-up
2014	Welsh International	(Scotland) Kieran Merrilees	15–21, 10–21	(silver) Runner-up
2015	Estonian International	(Finland) Anton Kaisti	16–21, 16–21	(silver) Runner-up
2015	Hellas International	(Germany) Fabian Roth	19–21, 21–19, 19–21	(silver) Runner-up
2017	Estonian International	(Estonia) Raul Must	21–16, 22–24, 13–21	(silver) Runner-up
2017	Swedish International	(Indonesia) Setyaldi Putra Wibowo	21–12, 21–11	(gold) Winner
2017	Kharkiv International	(Hong Kong) Lee Cheuk Yiu	21–17, 21–13	(gold) Winner
2018	Slovenian International	(Spain) Pablo Abián	21–18, 21–18	(gold) Winner
2018	Belgian International	(Denmark) Victor Svendsen	21–13, 19–21, 21–19	(gold) Winner
2019	Spanish International	(Thailand) Kunlavut Vitidsarn	14–21, 14–21	(silver) Runner-up

BWF International Challenge tournament
BWF International Series tournament
BWF Future Series tournament
