= Tanvi Lad =

Indian badminton player (born 1993)

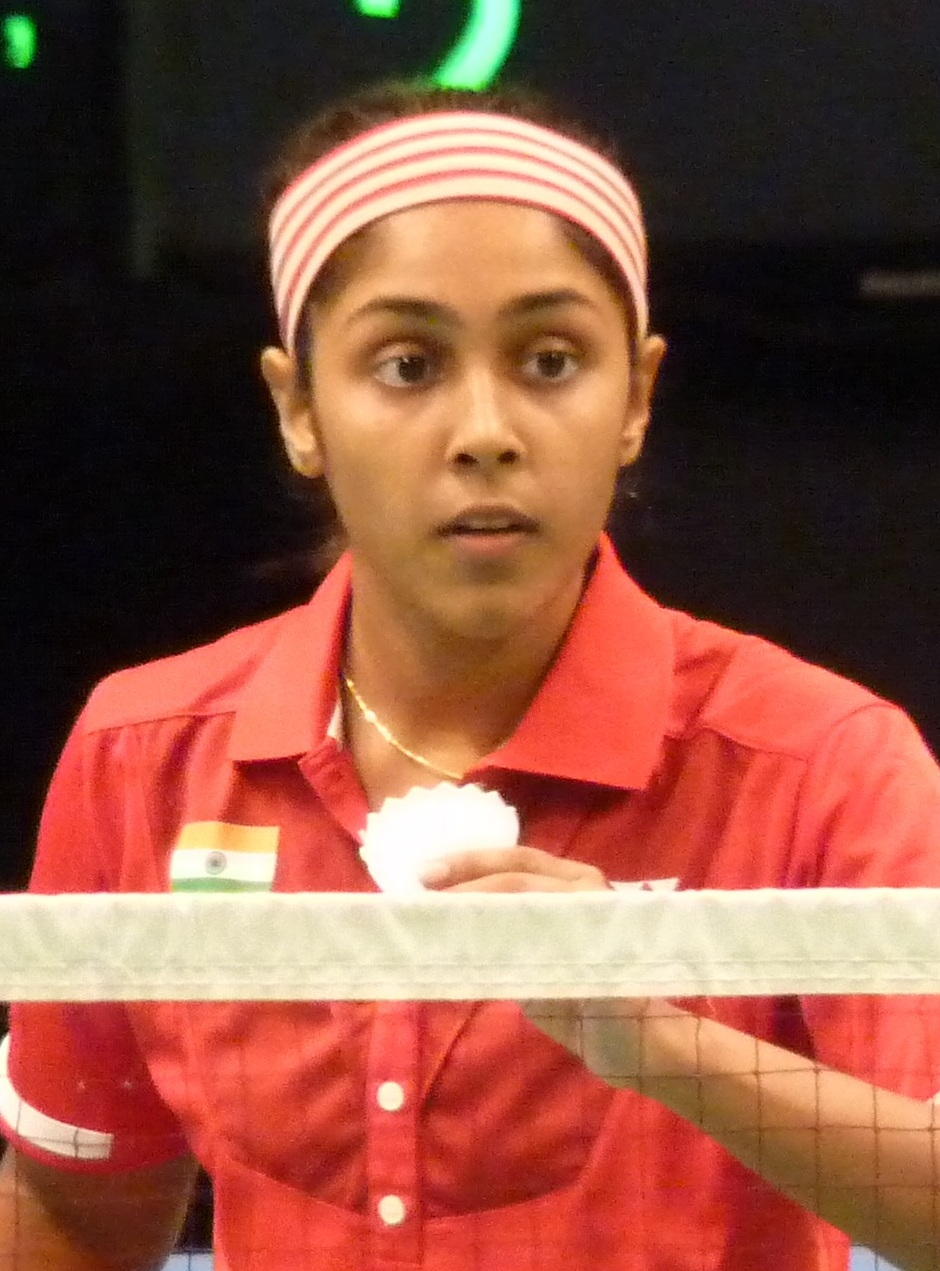
- Lad at the 2013 Dutch Open Grand Prix

Personal information
- Born: 30 January 1993 (age 33) Panaji, India

Sport
- Country: India
- Sport: Badminton

Women's singles
- Highest ranking: 51 (16 October 2014)
- BWF profile
Medal record
Women's badminton
Representing India
Uber Cup
Bronze medal – third place	2016 Kunshan	Women's team
Bronze medal – third place	2014 New Delhi	Women's team
Asian Games
Bronze medal – third place	2014 Incheon	Women's team
Asian Junior Championships
Bronze medal – third place	2011 Lucknow	Mixed team

Tanvi Lad (born 30 January 1993) is an Indian badminton player who currently plays singles.

== Achievements ==
=== BWF International Challenge/Series ===
Women's singles
Year	Tournament	Opponent	Score	Result
2012	Bahrain International	(India) Arundhati Pantawane	22–20, 12–21, 19–21	(silver) Runner-up
2013	Swiss International	(United States) Beiwen Zhang	12–21, 12–21	(silver) Runner-up
2013	Bahrain International Challenge	(India) Saili Rane	21–12, 21–18	(gold) Winner
2017	Welsh International	(France) Marie Batomene	21–15, 21–8	(gold) Winner
2019	Croatian International	(Hungary) Laura Sárosi	18–21, 13–21	(silver) Runner-up

BWF International Challenge tournament
BWF International Series tournament
BWF Future Series tournament
