= Gergely Krausz =

Hungarian badminton player (born 1993)

Personal information
- Born: 25 December 1993 (age 32) Mór, Hungary
- Height: 1.88 m (6 ft 2 in)
- Weight: 76 kg (168 lb)

Sport
- Country: Hungary
- Sport: Badminton
- Retired: 17 October 2021

Men's singles & doubles
- Highest ranking: 81 (MS 10 May 2018); 113 (MD 25 August 2016); 134 (XD 17 July 2014)
- BWF profile

Gergely Krausz (born 25 December 1993) is a Hungarian badminton player affiliated with Multi Alarm SE. He competed at the 2015 and 2019 European Games. Krausz is the first ever Hungarian men's singles player to participate at the Olympics by competing at the 2020 Tokyo Games. He retired from the international badminton on 17 October 2021.

== Achievements ==
=== BWF International Challenge/Series (2 titles, 3 runners-up) ===
Men's singles
Year	Tournament	Opponent	Score	Result
2016	Turkey International	(Denmark) Patrick Bjerregaard	19–21, 16–21	(silver) Runner-up
2018	Egypt International	(Azerbaijan) Ade Resky Dwicahyo	16–21, 16–21	(silver) Runner-up
2020	Uganda International	(Sri Lanka) Niluka Karunaratne	21–18, 18–21, 21–13	(gold) Winner

Men's doubles
Year	Tournament	Partner	Opponent	Score	Result
2014	Turkey International	(Thailand) Karnphop Atthaviroj	(Russia) Konstantin Abramov (Russia) Alexandr Zinchenko	17–21, 15–21	(silver) Runner-up
2015	Turkey International	(Thailand) Samatcha Tovannakasem	(Iran) Ashkan Fesahati (Iran) Mohamad Reza Khanjani	21–6, 21–6	(gold) Winner

BWF International Challenge tournament
BWF International Series tournament
BWF Future Series tournament
