= Alexandr Zinchenko =

Russian badminton player (born 1995)

Personal information
- Born: Alexandr Borisovich Zinchenko (Александр Борисович Зинченко); 6 February 1995 (age 31) Moscow, Russia
- Height: 1.84 m (6 ft 0 in)

Sport
- Country: Russia
- Sport: Badminton
- Handedness: Right

Men's & mixed doubles
- Highest ranking: 43 (MD, 2 November 2017); 75 (XD, 18 February 2015)
- BWF profile
Medal record
Men's badminton
Representing Russia
European Men's Team Championships
Bronze medal – third place	2020 Liévin	Men's team

Alexandr Borisovich Zinchenko (Russian: Александр Борисович Зинченко; born 6 February 1995) is a Russian badminton player. Zinchenko started playing badminton at the Solntsevo Sports School in Moscow, at the age of eight. His mother took Zinchenko there, because she was fond of badminton and played as an amateur. He made a debut in the international senior tournament in 2012. In 2014, he won the Turkey International tournament partnered with Konstantin Abramov. In 2016, he won the Estonian International tournament in the mixed doubles event partnered with Olga Morozova. In 2017, he and Abramov won the Swedish International Series tournament.

== Achievements ==
=== BWF World Tour ===
The BWF World Tour, which was announced on 19 March 2017 and implemented in 2018, is a series of elite badminton tournaments sanctioned by the Badminton World Federation (BWF). The BWF World Tours are divided into levels of World Tour Finals, Super 1000, Super 750, Super 500, Super 300 (part of the HSBC World Tour), and the BWF Tour Super 100.

Men's doubles
Year	Tournament	Level	Partner	Opponent	Score	Result
2018	Russian Open	Super 100	(Russia) Konstantin Abramov	(Malaysia) Mohamad Arif Abdul Latif (Malaysia) Nur Mohd Azriyn Ayub	Walkover	(silver) Runner-up

=== BWF Grand Prix ===
The BWF Grand Prix had two levels, the Grand Prix and Grand Prix Gold. It was a series of badminton tournaments sanctioned by the Badminton World Federation (BWF) and played between 2007 and 2017.

Men's doubles
Year	Tournament	Partner	Opponent	Score	Result
2016	Russian Open	(Russia) Konstantin Abramov	(Russia) Vladimir Ivanov (Russia) Ivan Sozonov	15–21, 14–21	(silver) Runner-up

=== BWF International Challenge/Series ===
Men's doubles
Year	Tournament	Partner	Opponent	Score	Result
2014	Turkey International	(Russia) Konstantin Abramov	(Thailand) Karnphop Atthaviroj (Hungary) Gergely Krausz	21–17, 21–15	(gold) Winner
2017	Swedish International	(Russia) Konstantin Abramov	(Sweden) Richard Eidestedt (Sweden) Nico Ruponen	21–17, 22–20	(gold) Winner
2017	White Nights	(Russia) Konstantin Abramov	(Germany) Mark Lamsfuß (Germany) Marvin Seidel	21–23, 14–21	(silver) Runner-up
2019	White Nights	(Russia) Nikita Khakimov	(Russia) Vitalij Durkin (Russia) Nikolai Ukk	22–20, 21–16	(gold) Winner

Mixed doubles
Year	Tournament	Partner	Opponent	Score	Result
2014	Slovenian International	(Russia) Olga Morozova	(Denmark) Jeppe Ludvigsen (Denmark) Mai Surrow	21–13, 16–21, 15–21	(silver) Runner-up
2014	Finnish International	(Russia) Olga Morozova	(Germany) Jones Ralfy Jansen (Germany) Cisita Joity Jansen	21–15, 17–21, 16–21	(silver) Runner-up
2016	Estonian International	(Russia) Olga Morozova	(France) Bastian Kersaudy (France) Léa Palermo	21–18, 21–18	(gold) Winner

BWF International Challenge tournament
BWF International Series tournament
BWF Future Series tournament
