= Konstantin Abramov =

Russian badminton player (born 1992)

Personal information
- Born: Konstantin Andreevich Abramov (Константин Андреевич Абрамов); 16 May 1992 (age 34) Moscow, Russia
- Height: 1.80 m (5 ft 11 in)

Sport
- Country: Russia
- Sport: Badminton
- Handedness: Right

Men's singles & doubles
- Highest ranking: 262 (MS 22 October 2009); 43 (MD 2 November 2017); 188 (XD 21 April 2011)
- BWF profile
Medal record
Men's badminton
Representing Russia
European Junior Championships
Silver medal – second place	2011 Vantaa	Mixed team

Konstantin Andreevich Abramov (Russian: Константин Андреевич Абрамов; born 16 May 1992) is a Russian badminton player. In 2014, he won the Turkey International tournament partnered with Alexandr Zinchenko. In 2017, he and Zinchenko won the Swedish International Series tournament.

== Achievements ==
=== BWF World Tour ===
The BWF World Tour, which was announced on 19 March 2017 and implemented in 2018, is a series of elite badminton tournaments sanctioned by the Badminton World Federation (BWF). The BWF World Tours are divided into levels of World Tour Finals, Super 1000, Super 750, Super 500, Super 300 (part of the HSBC World Tour), and the BWF Tour Super 100.

Men's doubles
Year	Tournament	Level	Partner	Opponent	Score	Result
2018	Russian Open	Super 100	(Russia) Alexandr Zinchenko	(Malaysia) Mohamad Arif Abdul Latif (Malaysia) Nur Mohd Azriyn Ayub	Walkover	(silver) Runner-up

=== BWF Grand Prix ===
The BWF Grand Prix had two levels, the Grand Prix and Grand Prix Gold. It was a series of badminton tournaments sanctioned by the Badminton World Federation (BWF) and played between 2007 and 2017.

Men's doubles
Year	Tournament	Partner	Opponent	Score	Result
2016	Russian Open	(Russia) Alexandr Zinchenko	(Russia) Vladimir Ivanov (Russia) Ivan Sozonov	15–21, 14–21	(silver) Runner-up

=== BWF International Challenge/Series ===
Men's doubles
Year	Tournament	Partner	Opponent	Score	Result
2013	Lithuanian International	(Russia) Yaroslav Egerev	(Russia) Andrey Ashmarin (Russia) Anatoliy Yartsev	21–18, 21–16	(silver) Runner-up
2014	Turkey International	(Russia) Alexandr Zinchenko	(Thailand) Karnphop Atthaviroj (Hungary) Gergely Krausz	21–17, 21–15	(gold) Winner
2017	Swedish International	(Russia) Alexandr Zinchenko	(Sweden) Richard Eidestedt (Sweden) Nico Ruponen	21–17, 22–20	(gold) Winner
2017	White Nights	(Russia) Alexandr Zinchenko	(Germany) Mark Lamsfuß (Germany) Marvin Seidel	21–23, 14–21	(silver) Runner-up

BWF International Challenge tournament
BWF International Series tournament
BWF Future Series tournament
