= Evgenia Dimova =

Russian badminton player (born 1982)

Personal information
- Born: Evgenia Aleksandrovna Dimova; Евгения Александровна Димова; 29 April 1982 (age 44) Vladivostok, Russia
- Height: 1.75 m (5 ft 9 in)

Sport
- Country: Russia
- Sport: Badminton
- Handedness: Right

Women's singles & doubles
- Highest ranking: 111 (WS 23 January 2014); 191 (WD 28 April 2016); 17 (XD 28 June 2018)
- BWF profile
Medal record
Women's badminton
Representing Russia
European Mixed Team Championships
Silver medal – second place	2017 Lubin	Mixed team
Bronze medal – third place	2019 Copenhagen	Mixed team
European Women's Team Championships
Silver medal – second place	2014 Basel	Women's team

Evgenia Aleksandrovna Dimova (Russian: Евгения Александровна Димова; born 29 April 1982) is a Russian badminton player.

== Achievements ==
=== BWF World Tour ===
The BWF World Tour, which was announced on 19 March 2017 and implemented in 2018, is a series of elite badminton tournaments sanctioned by the Badminton World Federation (BWF). The BWF World Tours are divided into levels of World Tour Finals, Super 1000, Super 750, Super 500, Super 300 (part of the HSBC World Tour), and the BWF Tour Super 100.

Mixed doubles
Year	Tournament	Level	Partner	Opponent	Score	Result
2019	Russian Open	Super 100	(Russia) Evgenij Dremin	(Indonesia) Adnan Maulana (Indonesia) Mychelle Crhystine Bandaso	21–19, 13–21, 15–21	(silver) Runner-up

=== BWF Grand Prix ===
The BWF Grand Prix had two levels, the Grand Prix and Grand Prix Gold. It was a series of badminton tournaments sanctioned by the Badminton World Federation (BWF) and played between 2007 and 2017. The World Badminton Grand Prix was sanctioned by the International Badminton Federation from 1983 to 2006.

Mixed doubles
Year	Tournament	Partner	Opponent	Score	Result
2005	Russian Open	(Russia) Sergey Lunev	(Russia) Nikolaj Nikolaenko (Russia) Valeria Sorokina	15–10, 15–8	(gold) Winner
2015	Brasil Open	(Russia) Evgenij Dremin	(China) Zheng Siwei (China) Chen Qingchen	12–21, 10–21	(silver) Runner-up

BWF Grand Prix Gold tournament
BWF Grand Prix tournament

=== BWF International Challenge/Series ===
Mixed doubles
Year	Tournament	Partner	Opponent	Score	Result
2011	Swiss International	(Russia) Sergey Lunev	(Russia) Vitalij Durkin (Russia) Nina Vislova	20–22, 23–25	(silver) Runner-up
2014	White Nights	(Russia) Evgenij Dremin	(Poland) Robert Mateusiak (Poland) Agnieszka Wojtkowska	21–17, 21–12	(gold) Winner
2015	Bulgarian International	(Russia) Evgenij Dremin	(Poland) Robert Mateusiak (Poland) Nadieżda Zięba	14–21, 18–21	(silver) Runner-up
2016	Peru International	(Russia) Evgenij Dremin	(Russia) Vitalij Durkin (Russia) Nina Vislova	23–25, 14–21	(silver) Runner-up
2016	Bahrain International Challenge	(Russia) Evgenij Dremin	(Russia) Anatoliy Yartsev (Russia) Evgeniya Kosetskaya	21–15, 21–11	(gold) Winner
2016	Yonex / K&D Graphics International	(Russia) Evgenij Dremin	(United States) Howard Shu (United States) Jamie Subandhi	21–6, 22–20	(gold) Winner
2018	Austrian International	(Russia) Evgenij Dremin	(Denmark) Lasse Mølhede (Denmark) Sara Lundgaard	21–15, 21–13	(gold) Winner
2018	Brazil International	(Russia) Evgenij Dremin	(India) Saurabh Sharma (India) Anoushka Parikh	21–17, 21–14	(gold) Winner
2018	Vietnam International	(Russia) Evgenij Dremin	(Vietnam) Đỗ Tuấn Đức (Vietnam) Phạm Như Thảo	22–20, 22–24, 15–21	(silver) Runner-up
2018	Spanish International	(Russia) Evgenij Dremin	(Denmark) Mikkel Mikkelsen (Denmark) Mai Surrow	24–22, 21–12	(gold) Winner
2018	Italian International	(Russia) Evgenij Dremin	(Russia) Rodion Alimov (Russia) Alina Davletova	13–21, 16–21	(silver) Runner-up

BWF International Challenge tournament
BWF International Series tournament
BWF Future Series tournament
