= Evgenij Dremin =

Russian badminton player (born 1981)

Personal information
- Born: 24 February 1981 (age 45) Chelyabinsk, Russian SFSR, Soviet Union
- Height: 1.95 m (6 ft 5 in)

Sport
- Country: Russia
- Sport: Badminton
- Handedness: Right

Men's & mixed doubles
- Highest ranking: 38 (MD 15 June 2017); 17 (XD 28 June 2018)
- BWF profile
Medal record
Men's badminton
Representing Russia
European Mixed Team Championships
Silver medal – second place	2017 Lubin	Mixed team
Bronze medal – third place	2011 Amsterdam	Mixed team
Bronze medal – third place	2019 Copenhagen	Mixed team
European Junior Championships
Silver medal – second place	1999 Glasgow	Mixed team

Evgenij Nikolaevich Dremin (Russian: Евгений Николаевич Дремин; born 24 February 1981) is a Russian badminton player.

== Achievements ==
=== BWF World Tour ===
The BWF World Tour, which was announced on 19 March 2017 and implemented in 2018, is a series of elite badminton tournaments sanctioned by the Badminton World Federation (BWF). The BWF World Tours are divided into levels of World Tour Finals, Super 1000, Super 750, Super 500, Super 300 (part of the HSBC World Tour), and the BWF Tour Super 100.

Mixed doubles
Year	Tournament	Level	Partner	Opponent	Score	Result
2019	Russian Open	Super 100	(Russia) Evgenia Dimova	(Indonesia) Adnan Maulana (Indonesia) Mychelle Crhystine Bandaso	21–19, 13–21, 15–21	(silver) Runner-up

=== BWF Grand Prix ===
The BWF Grand Prix had two levels, the Grand Prix and Grand Prix Gold. It was a series of badminton tournaments sanctioned by the Badminton World Federation (BWF) and played between 2007 and 2017.

Mixed doubles
Year	Tournament	Partner	Opponent	Score	Result
2015	Brasil Open	(Russia) Evgenia Dimova	(China) Zheng Siwei (China) Chen Qingchen	12–21, 10–21	(silver) Runner-up

BWF Grand Prix Gold tournament
BWF Grand Prix tournament

=== BWF International Challenge/Series ===
Men's singles
Year	Tournament	Opponent	Score	Result
2004	Russian International	(Russia) Stanislav Pukhov	5–15, 16–17	(silver) Runner-up

Men's doubles
Year	Tournament	Partner	Opponent	Score	Result
2006	Italian International	(Russia) Alexey Vasiliev	(Russia) Vitalij Durkin (Russia) Aleksandr Nikolaenko	14–21, 21–17, 16–21	(silver) Runner-up
2016	Bahrain International Challenge	(Russia) Denis Grachev	(India) Vighnesh Devlekar (India) Rohan Kapoor	21–18, 21–17	(gold) Winner
2017	Brazil International	(Russia) Denis Grachev	(Czech Republic) Adam Mendrek (Germany) Jonathan Persson	21–17, 21–16	(gold) Winner

Mixed doubles
Year	Tournament	Partner	Opponent	Score	Result
2010	Bulgarian International	(Russia) Anastasia Russkikh	(Estonia) Gert Künka (Sweden) Amanda Högström	21–14, 26–24	(gold) Winner
2010	White Nights	(Russia) Anastasia Russkikh	(Ukraine) Valeriy Atrashchenkov (Ukraine) Elena Prus	21–17, 21–14	(gold) Winner
2010	Norwegian International	(Russia) Anastasia Russkikh	(Germany) Michael Fuchs (Germany) Birgit Overzier	20–22, 10–21	(silver) Runner-up
2014	White Nights	(Russia) Evgenia Dimova	(Poland) Robert Mateusiak (Poland) Agnieszka Wojtkowska	21–17, 21–12	(gold) Winner
2015	Bulgarian International	(Russia) Evgenia Dimova	(Poland) Robert Mateusiak (Poland) Nadieżda Zięba	14–21, 18–21	(silver) Runner-up
2016	Peru International	(Russia) Evgenia Dimova	(Russia) Vitalij Durkin (Russia) Nina Vislova	23–25, 14–21	(silver) Runner-up
2016	Bahrain International Challenge	(Russia) Evgenia Dimova	(Russia) Anatoliy Yartsev (Russia) Evgeniya Kosetskaya	21–15, 21–11	(gold) Winner
2016	Yonex / K&D Graphics International	(Russia) Evgenia Dimova	(United States) Howard Shu (United States) Jamie Subandhi	21–6, 22–20	(gold) Winner
2018	Austrian International	(Russia) Evgenia Dimova	(Denmark) Lasse Mølhede (Denmark) Sara Lundgaard	21–15, 21–13	(gold) Winner
2018	Brazil International	(Russia) Evgenia Dimova	(India) Saurabh Sharma (India) Anoushka Parikh	21–17, 21–14	(gold) Winner
2018	Vietnam International	(Russia) Evgenia Dimova	(Vietnam) Đỗ Tuấn Đức (Vietnam) Phạm Như Thảo	22–20, 22–24, 15–21	(silver) Runner-up
2018	Spanish International	(Russia) Evgenia Dimova	(Denmark) Mikkel Mikkelsen (Denmark) Mai Surrow	24–22, 21–12	(gold) Winner
2018	Italian International	(Russia) Evgenia Dimova	(Russia) Rodion Alimov (Russia) Alina Davletova	13–21, 16–21	(silver) Runner-up

BWF International Challenge tournament
BWF International Series tournament
BWF Future Series tournament
