= Olga Morozova (badminton) =

Russian badminton player

Olga Morozova Ольга Морозова
Personal information
- Born: Olga Alekseevna Morozova (Ольга Алексеевна Морозова); 10 March 1995 (age 31) Yekaterinburg, Russia
- Years active: 2012–present
- Height: 1.74 m (5 ft 9 in)

Sport
- Country: Russia
- Sport: Badminton
- Handedness: Right

Women's & mixed doubles
- Highest ranking: 19 (WD 30 November 2017); 75 (XD 18 February 2015)
- BWF profile
Medal record
Women's badminton
Representing Russia
European Championships
Bronze medal – third place	2017 Kolding	Women's doubles
European Mixed Team Championships
Silver medal – second place	2017 Lubin	Mixed team
Bronze medal – third place	2021 Vantaa	Mixed team
European Women's Team Championships
Silver medal – second place	2014 Basel	Women's team
Bronze medal – third place	2018 Kazan	Women's team

Olga Alekseevna Morozova (Russian: Ольга Алексеевна Морозова; born 10 March 1995) is a Russian badminton player. She won a bronze medal at the 2017 European Championships in the women's doubles partnering Anastasiia Akchurina. She won double titles at the 2016 Estonian International tournament in the women's and mixed doubles event.

== Achievements ==
=== European Championships ===
Women's doubles
Year	Venue	Partner	Opponent	Score	Result
2017	Sydbank Arena; Kolding, Denmark	(Russia) Anastasiia Chervyakova	(Denmark) Christinna Pedersen (Denmark) Kamilla Rytter Juhl	10–21, 13–21	Bronze

=== BWF World Tour (1 runner-up) ===
The BWF World Tour, which was announced on 19 March 2017 and implemented in 2018, is a series of elite badminton tournaments sanctioned by the Badminton World Federation (BWF). The BWF World Tour is divided into levels of World Tour Finals, Super 1000, Super 750, Super 500, Super 300, and the BWF Tour Super 100.

Women's doubles
Year	Tournament	Level	Partner	Opponent	Score	Result
2022	India Open	Super 500	(Russia) Anastasiia Akchurina	(Thailand) Benyapa Aimsaard (Thailand) Nuntakarn Aimsaard	13–21, 5–21	(silver) Runner-up

=== BWF Grand Prix (1 title, 1 runner-up) ===
The BWF Grand Prix had two levels, the Grand Prix and Grand Prix Gold. It was a series of badminton tournaments sanctioned by the Badminton World Federation (BWF) and played between 2007 and 2017.

Women's doubles
Year	Tournament	Partner	Opponent	Score	Result
2016	Russian Open	(Russia) Anastasiia Chervyakova	(Russia) Evgeniya Kosetskaya (Russia) Ksenia Polikarpova	21–14, 22–20	(gold) Winner

Mixed doubles
Year	Tournament	Partner	Opponent	Score	Result
2014	Russian Open	(Russia) Ivan Sozonov	(Japan) Ryota Taohata (Japan) Misato Aratama	12–21, 10–21	(silver) Runner-up

BWF Grand Prix Gold tournament
BWF Grand Prix tournament

=== BWF International Challenge/Series (7 titles, 8 runners-up) ===
Women's doubles
Year	Tournament	Partner	Opponent	Score	Result
2014	Slovenia International	(Russia) Victoria Dergunova	(Bulgaria) Gabriela Stoeva (Bulgaria) Stefani Stoeva	16–21, 17–21	(silver) Runner-up
2014	Finnish International	(Russia) Victoria Dergunova	(Russia) Irina Khlebko (Russia) Elena Komendrovskaja	21–11, 21–15	(gold) Winner
2014	Italian International	(Russia) Victoria Dergunova	(Netherlands) Samantha Barning (Netherlands) Iris Tabeling	17–21, 15–21	(silver) Runner-up
2015	Estonian International	(Russia) Victoria Dergunova	(Denmark) Amanda Madsen (Denmark) Isabella Nielsen	21–17, 21–12	(gold) Winner
2015	Spanish International	(Russia) Anastasiia Chervyakova	(Bulgaria) Gabriela Stoeva (Bulgaria) Stefani Stoeva	16–21, 11–21	(silver) Runner-up
2016	Estonian International	(Russia) Anastasiia Chervyakova	(Estonia) Kristin Kuuba (Estonia) Helina Rüütel	21–14, 21–15	(gold) Winner
2016	White Nights	(Russia) Anastasiia Chervyakova	(Japan) Asumi Kugo (Japan) Megumi Yokoyama	12–21, 7–21	(silver) Runner-up
2016	Welsh International	(Russia) Anastasiia Chervyakova	(India) Ashwini Ponnappa (India) N. Sikki Reddy	21–16, 21–11	(gold) Winner
2016	Italian International	(Russia) Anastasiia Chervyakova	(Bulgaria) Mariya Mitsova (Bulgaria) Petya Nedelcheva	21–18, 21–17	(gold) Winner
2017	White Nights	(Russia) Anastasiia Chervyakova	(France) Delphine Delrue (France) Léa Palermo	21–8, 21–15	(gold) Winner
2019	Estonian International	(Russia) Anastasiia Akchurina	(Denmark) Julie Finne-Ipsen (Denmark) Mai Surrow	12–21, 21–17, 14–21	(silver) Runner-up
2019	Austrian Open	(Russia) Anastasiia Akchurina	(China) Liu Xuanxuan (China) Xia Yuting	17–21, 15–21	(silver) Runner-up

Mixed doubles
Year	Tournament	Partner	Opponent	Score	Result
2014	Slovenia International	(Russia) Alexandr Zinchenko	(Denmark) Jeppe Ludvigsen (Denmark) Mai Surrow	21–13, 16–21, 15–21	(silver) Runner-up
2014	Finnish International	(Russia) Alexandr Zinchenko	(Germany) Jones Ralfy Jansen (Germany) Cisita Joity Jansen	21–15, 17–21, 16–21	(silver) Runner-up
2016	Estonian International	(Russia) Alexandr Zinchenko	(France) Bastian Kersaudy (France) Léa Palermo	21–18, 21–18	(gold) Winner

BWF International Challenge tournament
BWF International Series tournament
BWF Future Series tournament
