= 2014 European Women's Team Badminton Championships group stage =

This article lists the full results for group stage of 2014 European Women's Team Badminton Championships. The group stage was held from 11 to 13 February 2014.

== Group 1 ==
Pos	Team	Pld	W	L	MF	MA	MD	GF	GA	GD	PF	PA	PD	Pts	Qualification	Denmark	Czech Republic	Turkey	Hungary
1	Denmark	3	3	0	15	0	+15	28	0	+28	584	346	+238	3	Knockout stage	—	5–0	5–0	5–0
2	Czech Republic	3	2	1	9	6	+3	16	15	+1	552	512	+40	2			—	5–0	4–1
3	Turkey	3	1	2	4	11	−7	9	20	−11	442	569	−127	1				—	4–1
4	Hungary	3	0	3	2	13	−11	8	26	−18	523	674	−151	0					—

Source: BWF

=== Denmark vs. Czech Republic ===
Denmark
5
St. Jakobshalle, Court 3
11 February 2014, 14:00 UTC+1

Czech Republic
0

			1	2	3
1	(Denmark) (Czech Republic)	Line Kjærsfeldt; Kristína Gavnholt	22; 20	21; 16
2	(Denmark) (Czech Republic)	Line Damkjær Kruse / Marie Røpke; Lucie Černá / Kateřina Tomalová	21; 8	21; 14
3	(Denmark) (Czech Republic)	Sandra-Maria Jensen; Zuzana Pavelková	21; 15	21; 8
4	(Denmark) (Czech Republic)	Lena Grebak / Maria Helsbøl; Kristína Gavnholt / Hana Milisová	21; 17	21; 18
5	(Denmark) (Czech Republic)	Anna Thea Madsen; Lucie Černá	21; 15	21; 11

=== Turkey vs. Hungary ===
Turkey
4
St. Jakobshalle, Court 8
11 February 2014, 14:00 UTC+1

Hungary
1

			1	2	3
1	(Turkey) (Hungary)	Ebru Yazgan; Laura Sárosi	16; 21	13; 21
2	(Turkey) (Hungary)	Cemre Fere; Mónika Szőke	21; 18	21; 17
3	(Turkey) (Hungary)	Ebru Tunalı; Orsolya Varga	14; 21	21; 19	21; 13
4	(Turkey) (Hungary)	Özge Toyran / Ebru Yazgan; Laura Sárosi / Réka Sárosi	21; 19	19; 21	21; 19
5	(Turkey) (Hungary)	Cemre Fere / Ebru Tunalı; Daniella Gonda / Orsolya Varga	21; 18	23; 21

=== Denmark vs. Turkey ===
Denmark
5
St. Jakobshalle, Court 2
12 February 2014, 10:00 UTC+1

Turkey
0

			1	2	3
1	(Denmark) (Turkey)	Line Kjærsfeldt; Ebru Yazgan	21; 9	21; 6
2	(Denmark) (Turkey)	Anna Thea Madsen; Cemre Fere	21; 18	21; 12
3	(Denmark) (Turkey)	Mia Blichfeldt; Ebru Tunalı	21; 17	15; 14		retired
4	(Denmark) (Turkey)	Line Damkjær Kruse / Sandra-Maria Jensen; Özge Toyran / Ebru Yazgan	21; 13	21; 6
5	(Denmark) (Turkey)	Lena Grebak / Maria Helsbøl; Cemre Fere / Ebru Tunalı				w/o

=== Czech Republic vs. Hungary ===
Czech Republic
4
St. Jakobshalle, Court 10
12 February 2014, 10:00 UTC+1

Hungary
1

			1	2	3
1	(Czech Republic) (Hungary)	Kristína Gavnholt; Laura Sárosi	21; 9	21; 10
2	(Czech Republic) (Hungary)	Zuzana Pavelková; Daniella Gonda	19; 21	14; 21
3	(Czech Republic) (Hungary)	Lucie Černá; Orsolya Varga	21; 15	9; 21	21; 16
4	(Czech Republic) (Hungary)	Kristína Gavnholt / Hana Milisová; Laura Sárosi / Réka Sárosi	21; 15	21; 23	21; 10
5	(Czech Republic) (Hungary)	Lucie Černá / Kateřina Tomalová; Daniella Gonda / Eszter Zsolt	21; 12	21; 13

=== Czech Republic vs. Turkey ===
Czech Republic
5
St. Jakobshalle, Court 10
13 February 2014, 10:00 UTC+1

Turkey
0

			1	2	3
1	(Czech Republic) (Turkey)	Kristína Gavnholt; Ebru Yazgan	21; 7	21; 11
2	(Czech Republic) (Turkey)	Zuzana Pavelková; Cemre Fere	21; 16	21; 15
3	(Czech Republic) (Turkey)	Lucie Černá; Özge Toyran	21; 6	21; 14
4	(Czech Republic) (Turkey)	Lucie Černá / Kateřina Tomalová; Cemre Fere / Ebru Yazgan	21; 12	11; 21	21; 13
5	(Czech Republic) (Turkey)	Kristína Gavnholt / Hana Milisová; Özge Toyran / Ebru Tunalı				w/o

=== Denmark vs. Hungary ===
Denmark
5
St. Jakobshalle, Court 10
13 February 2014, 18:00 UTC+1

Hungary
0

			1	2	3
1	(Denmark) (Hungary)	Sandra-Maria Jensen; Mónika Szőke	21; 9	21; 13
2	(Denmark) (Hungary)	Anna Thea Madsen; Daniella Gonda	21; 11	22; 20
3	(Denmark) (Hungary)	Mia Blichfeldt; Orsolya Varga	21; 11	21; 13
4	(Denmark) (Hungary)	Kamilla Rytter Juhl / Christinna Pedersen; Daniella Gonda / Eszter Zsolt	21; 8	21; 6
5	(Denmark) (Hungary)	Line Damkjær Kruse / Marie Røpke; Mónika Szőke / Orsolya Varga	21; 7	21; 11

== Group 2 ==
Pos	Team	Pld	W	L	MF	MA	MD	GF	GA	GD	PF	PA	PD	Pts	Qualification	Germany	Spain	Iceland	Latvia
1	Germany	3	3	0	13	2	+11	27	6	+21	680	448	+232	3	Knockout stage	—	3–2	5–0	5–0
2	Spain	3	2	1	10	5	+5	22	12	+10	665	549	+116	2	Knockout stage		—	3–2	5–0
3	Iceland	3	1	2	6	9	−3	12	19	−7	481	609	−128	1				—	4–1
4	Latvia	3	0	3	1	14	−13	4	28	−24	439	659	−220	0					—

Source: BWF

=== Germany vs. Latvia ===
Germany
5
St. Jakobshalle, Court 4
11 February 2024, 14:00 UTC+1

Latvia
0

			1	2	3
1	(Germany) (Latvia)	Karin Schnaase; Jekaterina Romanova	21; 8	21; 7
2	(Germany) (Latvia)	Olga Konon; Ieva Pope	21; 7	21; 9
3	(Germany) (Latvia)	Fabienne Deprez; Kristīne Šefere	21; 18	19; 21	21; 16
4	(Germany) (Latvia)	Johanna Goliszewski / Birgit Michels; Monika Radovska / Jekaterina Romanova	21; 12	21; 4
5	(Germany) (Latvia)	Isabel Herttrich / Carla Nelte; Ieva Pope / Kristīne Šefere	21; 14	21; 15

=== Spain vs. Iceland ===
Spain
3
St. Jakobshalle, Court 5
11 February 2024, 14:00 UTC+1

Iceland
2

			1	2	3
1	(Spain) (Iceland)	Carolina Marín; Margrét Jóhannsdóttir	21; 8	21; 15
2	(Spain) (Iceland)	Beatriz Corrales; Sara Högnadóttir	21; 10	21; 10
3	(Spain) (Iceland)	Clara Azurmendi; Tinna Helgadóttir	15; 21	25; 27
4	(Spain) (Iceland)	Beatriz Corrales / Laura Samaniego; Rakel Jóhannesdóttir / Margrét Jóhannsdóttir	21; 23	21; 13	14; 21
5	(Spain) (Iceland)	Clara Azurmendi / Carolina Marín; Tinna Helgadóttir / Snjólaug Jóhannsdóttir	21; 14	21; 15

=== Germany vs. Spain ===
Germany
3
St. Jakobshalle, Court 1
12 February 2024, 10:00 UTC+1

Spain
2

			1	2	3
1	(Germany) (Spain)	Karin Schnaase; Carolina Marín	18; 21	17; 21
2	(Germany) (Spain)	Olga Konon; Beatriz Corrales	23; 21	21; 8
3	(Germany) (Spain)	Birgit Michels; Clara Azurmendi	21; 10	17; 21	21; 18
4	(Germany) (Spain)	Johanna Goliszewski / Olga Konon; Beatriz Corrales / Carolina Marín	21; 17	18; 21	22; 24
5	(Germany) (Spain)	Isabel Herttrich / Carla Nelte; Clara Azurmendi / Laura Samaniego	21; 11	21; 19

=== Latvia vs. Iceland ===
Latvia
1
St. Jakobshalle, Court 7
12 February 2024, 14:00 UTC+1

Iceland
4

			1	2	3
1	(Latvia) (Iceland)	Monika Radovska; Margrét Jóhannsdóttir	11; 21	20; 22
2	(Latvia) (Iceland)	Ieva Pope; Tinna Helgadóttir	21; 15	21; 13
3	(Latvia) (Iceland)	Kristīne Šefere; Snjólaug Jóhannsdóttir	21; 23	18; 21
4	(Latvia) (Iceland)	Ieva Pope / Jekaterina Romanova; Rakel Jóhannesdóttir / Margrét Jóhannsdóttir	16; 21	17; 21
5	(Latvia) (Iceland)	Monika Radovska / Kristīne Šefere; Tinna Helgadóttir / Snjólaug Jóhannsdóttir	14; 21	18; 21

=== Latvia vs. Spain ===
Latvia
0
St. Jakobshalle, Court 5
13 February 2024, 14:00 UTC+1

Spain
5

			1	2	3
1	(Latvia) (Spain)	Monika Radovska; Carolina Marín	8; 21	4; 21
2	(Latvia) (Spain)	Ieva Pope; Beatriz Corrales	13; 21	12; 21
3	(Latvia) (Spain)	Kristīne Šefere; Clara Azurmendi	8; 21	21; 18	7; 21
4	(Latvia) (Spain)	Monika Radovska / Jekaterina Romanova; Clara Azurmendi / Laura Samaniego	17; 21	22; 24
5	(Latvia) (Spain)	Ieva Pope / Kristīne Šefere; Beatriz Corrales / Carolina Marín	9; 21	10; 21

=== Germany vs. Iceland ===
Germany
5
St. Jakobshalle, Court 8
13 February 2024, 14:00 UTC+1

Iceland
0

			1	2	3
1	(Germany) (Iceland)	Karin Schnaase; Margrét Jóhannsdóttir	21; 8	21; 8
2	(Germany) (Iceland)	Fabienne Deprez; Sara Högnadóttir	21; 11	21; 11
3	(Germany) (Iceland)	Luise Heim; Snjólaug Jóhannsdóttir	21; 15	21; 10
4	(Germany) (Iceland)	Anika Dörr / Birgit Michels; Rakel Jóhannesdóttir / Margrét Jóhannsdóttir	21; 8	21; 12
5	(Germany) (Iceland)	Johanna Goliszewski / Carla Nelte; Tinna Helgadóttir / Snjólaug Jóhannsdóttir	21; 11	21; 11

== Group 3 ==
Pos	Team	Pld	W	L	MF	MA	MD	GF	GA	GD	PF	PA	PD	Pts	Qualification	Bulgaria	France	Ireland	Netherlands
1	Bulgaria	3	3	0	13	2	+11	27	8	+19	720	488	+232	3	Knockout stage	—	4–1	5–0	4–1
2	France	3	2	1	9	6	+3	20	14	+6	638	612	+26	2	Knockout stage		—	4–1	4–1
3	Ireland	3	1	2	4	11	−7	11	22	−11	511	651	−140	1				—	3–2
4	Netherlands	3	0	3	4	11	−7	9	23	−14	507	625	−118	0					—

Source: BWF

=== Bulgaria vs. Ireland ===
Bulgaria
5
St. Jakobshalle, Court 7
11 February 2014, 14:00 UTC+1

Ireland
0

			1	2	3
1	(Bulgaria) (Republic of Ireland)	Petya Nedelcheva; Chloe Magee	19; 21	21; 18	21; 16
2	(Bulgaria) (Republic of Ireland)	Stefani Stoeva; Alannah Stephenson	21; 4	21; 14
3	(Bulgaria) (Republic of Ireland)	Dimitria Popstoikova; Jennie King	21; 8	21; 11
4	(Bulgaria) (Republic of Ireland)	Stefani Stoeva / Linda Zetchiri; Sinead Chambers / Chloe Magee	21; 10	21; 10
5	(Bulgaria) (Republic of Ireland)	Petya Nedelcheva / Dimitria Popstoikova; Jennie King / Alannah Stephenson	21; 7	21; 5

=== Netherlands vs. France ===
Netherlands
1
St. Jakobshalle, Court 1
11 February 2014, 14:00 UTC+1

France
4

			1	2	3
1	(Netherlands) (France)	Gayle Mahulette; Sashina Vignes Waran	11; 21	7; 21
2	(Netherlands) (France)	Alida Chen; Perrine Le Buhanic	14; 21	15; 21
3	(Netherlands) (France)	Dorien Lups; Delphine Lansac	19; 21	19; 21
4	(Netherlands) (France)	Eefje Muskens / Selena Piek; Audrey Fontaine / Perrine Le Buhanic	21; 11	22; 20
5	(Netherlands) (France)	Samantha Barning / Iris Tabeling; Delphine Lansac / Émilie Lefel	15; 21	17; 21

=== Ireland vs. France ===
Ireland
1
St. Jakobshalle, Court 3
12 February 2014, 10:00 UTC+1

France
4

			1	2	3
1	(Republic of Ireland) (France)	Chloe Magee; Sashina Vignes Waran	22; 20	21; 14
2	(Republic of Ireland) (France)	Alannah Stephenson; Perrine Le Buhanic	21; 23	11; 21
3	(Republic of Ireland) (France)	Sinead Chambers; Delphine Lansac	13; 21	21; 19	16; 21
4	(Republic of Ireland) (France)	Jennie King / Alannah Stephenson; Émilie Lefel / Anne Tran	16; 21	14; 21
5	(Republic of Ireland) (France)	Sinead Chambers / Chloe Magee; Lorraine Baumann / Teshana Vignes Waran	14; 21	17; 21

=== Bulgaria vs. Netherlands ===
Bulgaria
4
St. Jakobshalle, Court 8
12 February 2014, 18:00 UTC+1

Netherlands
1

			1	2	3
1	(Bulgaria) (Netherlands)	Petya Nedelcheva; Gayle Mahulette	21; 8	21; 4
2	(Bulgaria) (Netherlands)	Linda Zetchiri; Alida Chen	21; 14	21; 18
3	(Bulgaria) (Netherlands)	Stefani Stoeva; Dorien Lups	21; 5	21; 15
4	(Bulgaria) (Netherlands)	Petya Nedelcheva / Dimitria Popstoikova; Samantha Barning / Iris Tabeling	18; 21	21; 10	21; 10
5	(Bulgaria) (Netherlands)	Gabriela Stoeva / Stefani Stoeva; Eefje Muskens / Selena Piek	20; 21	19; 21

=== Bulgaria vs. France ===
Bulgaria
4
St. Jakobshalle, Court 2
13 February 2014, 14:00 UTC+1

France
1

			1	2	3
1	(Bulgaria) (France)	Petya Nedelcheva; Sashina Vignes Waran	21; 15	19; 21	20; 22
2	(Bulgaria) (France)	Linda Zetchiri; Perrine Lebuhanic	20; 22	21; 15	21; 16
3	(Bulgaria) (France)	Stefani Stoeva; Delphine Lansac	21; 13	21; 11
4	(Bulgaria) (France)	Gabriela Stoeva / Stefani Stoeva; Audrey Fontaine / Perrine Le Buhanic	21; 16	21; 10
5	(Bulgaria) (France)	Petya Nedelcheva / Dimitria Popstoikova; Delphine Lansac / Émilie Lefel	18; 21	21; 18	21; 16

=== Ireland vs. Netherlands ===
Ireland
3
St. Jakobshalle, Court 7
13 February 2014, 18:00 UTC+1

Netherlands
2

			1	2	3
1	(Republic of Ireland) (Netherlands)	Chloe Magee; Gayle Mahulette	21; 14	21; 18
2	(Republic of Ireland) (Netherlands)	Alannah Stephenson; Alida Chen	21; 14	21; 15
3	(Republic of Ireland) (Netherlands)	Sinead Chambers; Iris Tabeling	21; 17	21; 18
4	(Republic of Ireland) (Netherlands)	Jennie King / Alannah Stephenson; Samantha Barning / Selena Piek	12; 21	9; 21
5	(Republic of Ireland) (Netherlands)	Sinead Chambers / Chloe Magee; Myke Halkema / Eefje Muskens	21; 23	21; 17	12; 21

== Group 4 ==
Pos	Team	Pld	W	L	MF	MA	MD	GF	GA	GD	PF	PA	PD	Pts	Qualification	Russia	Switzerland	Scotland	Belgium
1	Russia	3	3	0	12	3	+9	25	8	+17	655	472	+183	3	Knockout stage	—	4–1	3–2	5–0
2	Switzerland (H)	3	2	1	7	8	−1	17	19	−2	639	685	−46	2			—	3–2	3–2
3	Scotland	3	1	2	7	8	−1	15	16	−1	529	567	−38	1				—	3–2
4	Belgium	3	0	3	4	11	−7	10	24	−14	575	674	−99	0					—

Source: BWF
(H) Host

=== Russia vs. Switzerland ===
Russia
4
St. Jakobshalle, Court 3
11 February 2014, 18:00 UTC+1

Switzerland
1

			1	2	3
1	(Russia) (Switzerland)	Natalia Perminova; Sabrina Jaquet	21; 15	18; 21	21; 10
2	(Russia) (Switzerland)	Ella Diehl; Ayla Huser	21; 11	21; 13
3	(Russia) (Switzerland)	Ekaterina Bolotova / Evgeniya Kosetskaya; Marion Gruber / Sabrina Jaquet	19; 21	21; 12	19; 21
4	(Russia) (Switzerland)	Anastasia Chervyakova; Nicole Ankli	21; 8	21; 12
5	(Russia) (Switzerland)	Olga Morozova / Nina Vislova; Céline Burkart / Ayla Huser	21; 15	21; 13

=== Belgium vs. Scotland ===
Belgium
2
St. Jakobshalle, Court 4
11 February 2014, 18:00 UTC+1

Scotland
3

			1	2	3
1	(Belgium) (Scotland)	Lianne Tan; Kirsty Gilmour	12; 21	15; 21
2	(Belgium) (Scotland)	Janne Elst / Jelske Snoeck; Jillie Cooper / Caitlin Pringle	17; 21	18; 21
3	(Belgium) (Scotland)	Flore Vandenhoucke; Rebekka Findlay	21; 19	21; 18
4	(Belgium) (Scotland)	Steffi Annys / Séverine Corvilain; Imogen Bankier / Kirsty Gilmour	16; 21	13; 21
5	(Belgium) (Scotland)	Stephanie van Wel; Caitlin Pringle	21; 13	21; 13

=== Switzerland vs. Scotland ===
Switzerland
3
St. Jakobshalle, Court 1
12 February 2014, 18:00 UTC+1

Scotland
2

			1	2	3
1	(Switzerland) (Scotland)	Sabrina Jaquet; Kirsty Gilmour	19; 21	18; 21
2	(Switzerland) (Scotland)	Ayla Huser; Rebekka Findlay	27; 25	21; 12
3	(Switzerland) (Scotland)	Cendrine Hantz; Caitlin Pringle	21; 17	21; 8
4	(Switzerland) (Scotland)	Céline Burkart / Ayla Huser; Jillie Cooper / Kirsty Gilmour	11; 21	11; 21
5	(Switzerland) (Scotland)	Marion Gruber / Sabrina Jaquet; Imogen Bankier / Caitlin Pringle	21; 19	12; 21	21; 16

=== Russia vs. Belgium ===
Russia
5
St. Jakobshalle, Court 10
12 February 2014, 18:00 UTC+1

Belgium
0

			1	2	3
1	(Russia) (Belgium)	Natalia Perminova; Lianne Tan	11; 21	21; 18	21; 18
2	(Russia) (Belgium)	Evgeniya Kosetskaya; Flore Vandenhoucke	21; 18	21; 7
3	(Russia) (Belgium)	Ekaterina Bolotova; Stephanie van Wel	21; 11	21; 17
4	(Russia) (Belgium)	Anastasia Chervyakova / Nina Vislova; Steffi Annys / Séverine Corvilain	21; 6	21; 12
5	(Russia) (Belgium)	Ekaterina Bolotova / Olga Morozova; Janne Elst / Jelske Snoeck	21; 16	21; 18

=== Russia vs. Scotland ===
Russia
3
St. Jakobshalle, Court 3
13 February 2014, 14:00 UTC+1

Scotland
2

			1	2	3
1	(Russia) (Scotland)	Natalia Perminova; Kirsty Gilmour	17; 21	17; 21
2	(Russia) (Scotland)	Ella Diehl; Rebekka Findlay	21; 12	21; 7
3	(Russia) (Scotland)	Anastasia Chervyakova; Caitlin Pringle	21; 13	21; 5
4	(Russia) (Scotland)	Ekaterina Bolotova / Olga Morozova; Imogen Bankier / Kirsty Gilmour	12; 21	17; 21
5	(Russia) (Scotland)	Evgeniya Kosetskaya / Nina Vislova; Rebekka Findlay / Caitlin Pringle	21; 3	21; 14

=== Switzerland vs. Belgium ===
Switzerland
3
St. Jakobshalle, Court 9
13 February 2014, 14:00 UTC+1

Belgium
2

			1	2	3
1	(Switzerland) (Belgium)	Sabrina Jaquet; Lianne Tan	21; 19	21; 14
2	(Switzerland) (Belgium)	Ayla Huser; Flore Vandenhoucke	23; 25	21; 15	21; 13
3	(Switzerland) (Belgium)	Marion Gruber / Tiffany Zaugg; Janne Elst / Jelske Snoeck	25; 23	21; 17
4	(Switzerland) (Belgium)	Cendrine Hantz; Stephanie van Wel	21; 18	15; 21	17; 21
5	(Switzerland) (Belgium)	Ayla Huser / Sabrina Jaquet; Steffi Annys / Séverine Corvilain	21; 10	19; 21	18; 21

== Group 5 ==
Pos	Team	Pld	W	L	MF	MA	MD	GF	GA	GD	PF	PA	PD	Pts	Qualification	England	Ukraine	Estonia	Wales	Finland
1	England	4	4	0	20	0	+20	40	3	+37	884	628	+256	4	Knockout stage	—	5–0	5–0	5–0	5–0
2	Ukraine	4	3	1	15	5	+10	32	16	+16	942	807	+135	3	Knockout stage		—	5–0	5–0	5–0
3	Estonia	4	2	2	6	14	−8	16	33	−17	842	928	−86	2				—	3–2	3–2
4	Wales	4	1	3	5	15	−10	14	32	−18	756	903	−147	1					—	3–2
5	Finland	4	0	4	4	16	−12	15	33	−18	784	942	−158	0						—

Source: BWF

=== Ukraine vs. Wales ===
Ukraine
5
St. Jakobshalle, Court 5
11 February 2014, 10:00 UTC+1

Wales
0

			1	2	3
1	(Ukraine) (Wales)	Marija Ulitina; Carissa Turner	18; 21	22; 20	21; 16
2	(Ukraine) (Wales)	Natalya Voytsekh; Aimee Moran	21; 11	21; 12
3	(Ukraine) (Wales)	Yuliya Kazarinova; Jordan Hart	21; 11	21; 13
4	(Ukraine) (Wales)	Marija Ulitina / Natalya Voytsekh; Vikki Jones / Aimee Moran	21; 19	21; 12
5	(Ukraine) (Wales)	Yuliya Kazarinova / Yelyzaveta Zharka; Carissa Turner / Sarah Thomas	21; 13	21; 15

=== England vs. Estonia ===
England
5
St. Jakobshalle, Court 7
11 February 2014, 10:00 UTC+1

Estonia
0

			1	2	3
1	(England) (Estonia)	Fontaine Chapman; Laura Vana	21; 5	21; 12
2	(England) (Estonia)	Heather Olver / Kate Robertshaw; Kristin Kuuba / Helina Rüütel	21; 13	21; 6
3	(England) (Estonia)	Panuga Riou; Karoliine Hõim	21; 19	17; 21	21; 8
4	(England) (Estonia)	Alyssa Lim / Lauren Smith; Kati-Kreet Marran / Sale-Liis Teesalu	21; 10	21; 14
5	(England) (Estonia)	Chloe Birch; Kristin Kuuba	21; 17	21; 14

=== England vs. Ukraine ===
England
5
St. Jakobshalle, Court 2
11 February 2014, 18:00 UTC+1

Ukraine
0

			1	2	3
1	(England) (Ukraine)	Sarah Walker; Marija Ulitina	6; 21	22; 20	22; 20
2	(England) (Ukraine)	Fontaine Chapman; Natalya Voytsekh	22; 20	21; 14
3	(England) (Ukraine)	Panuga Riou; Yuliya Kazarinova	21; 15	21; 7
4	(England) (Ukraine)	Gabby Adcock / Lauren Smith; Marija Ulitina / Natalya Voytsekh	21; 11	21; 19
5	(England) (Ukraine)	Heather Olver / Kate Robertshaw; Yuliya Kazarinova / Yelyzaveta Zharka	18; 21	21; 19	21; 16

=== Estonia vs. Finland ===
Estonia
3
St. Jakobshalle, Court 10
11 February 2014, 18:00 UTC+1

Finland
2

			1	2	3
1	(Estonia) (Finland)	Laura Vana; Nanna Vainio	21; 13	21; 13
2	(Estonia) (Finland)	Karoliine Hõim; Airi Mikkelä	24; 26	21; 13	18; 21
3	(Estonia) (Finland)	Kristin Kuuba; Sonja Pekkola	21; 13	12; 21	21; 19
4	(Estonia) (Finland)	Kristin Kuuba / Helina Rüütel; Mathilda Lindholm / Airi Mikkelä	19; 21	21; 8	21; 11
5	(Estonia) (Finland)	Kati-Kreet Marran / Sale-Liis Teesalu; Sonja Pekkola / Sanni Rautala	11; 21	22; 24

=== Ukraine vs. Finland ===
Ukraine
5
St. Jakobshalle, Court 4
12 February 2014, 10:00 UTC+1

Finland
0

			1	2	3
1	(Ukraine) (Finland)	Marija Ulitina; Nanna Vainio	21; 12	18; 21	21; 13
2	(Ukraine) (Finland)	Natalya Voytsekh; Airi Mikkelä	25; 23	21; 13
3	(Ukraine) (Finland)	Yuliya Kazarinova; Sonja Pekkola	21; 13	12; 21	21; 13
4	(Ukraine) (Finland)	Natalya Voytsekh / Yelyzaveta Zharka; Mathilda Lindholm / Airi Mikkelä	19; 21	21; 14	21; 10
5	(Ukraine) (Finland)	Yuliya Kazarinova / Marija Ulitina; Sonja Pekkola / Sanni Rautala	21; 13	21; 14

=== England vs. Wales ===
England
5
St. Jakobshalle, Court 7
12 February 2014, 10:00 UTC+1

Wales
0

			1	2	3
1	(England) (Wales)	Sarah Walker; Carissa Turner	21; 16	21; 14
2	(England) (Wales)	Panuga Riou; Aimee Moran	21; 17	21; 19
3	(England) (Wales)	Chloe Birch; Jordan Hart	21; 6	21; 13
4	(England) (Wales)	Heather Olver / Kate Robertshaw; Carissa Turner / Sarah Thomas	21; 15	21; 19
5	(England) (Wales)	Chloe Birch / Alyssa Lim; Vikki Jones / Aimee Moran	21; 10	21; 18

=== Estonia vs. Ukraine ===
Estonia
0
St. Jakobshalle, Court 5
12 February 2014, 18:00 UTC+1

Ukraine
5

			1	2	3
1	(Estonia) (Ukraine)	Laura Vana; Marija Ulitina	16; 21	19; 21
2	(Estonia) (Ukraine)	Karoliine Hõim; Natalya Voytsekh	15; 21	21; 17	21; 23
3	(Estonia) (Ukraine)	Kristin Kuuba; Yelyzaveta Zharka	14; 21	20; 22
4	(Estonia) (Ukraine)	Kati-Kreet Marran / Sale-Liis Teesalu; Marija Ulitina / Natalya Voytsekh	16; 21	19; 21
5	(Estonia) (Ukraine)	Kristin Kuuba / Helina Rüütel; Yuliya Kazarinova / Yelyzaveta Zharka	21; 17	11; 21	13; 21

=== Wales vs. Finland ===
Wales
3
St. Jakobshalle, Court 7
12 February 2014, 18:00 UTC+1

Finland
2

			1	2	3
1	(Wales) (Finland)	Carissa Turner; Nanna Vainio	17; 21	21; 18	21; 5
2	(Wales) (Finland)	Aimee Moran; Airi Mikkelä	12; 21	19; 21
3	(Wales) (Finland)	Jordan Hart; Sonja Pekkola	13; 21	22; 20	21; 19
4	(Wales) (Finland)	Sarah Thomas / Carissa Turner; Mathilda Lindholm / Airi Mikkelä	21; 14	21; 18
5	(Wales) (Finland)	Aimee Moran / Vikki Jones; Sonja Pekkola / Sanni Rautala	17; 21	11; 21

=== England vs. Finland ===
England
5
St. Jakobshalle, Court 1
13 February 2014, 14:00 UTC+1

Finland
0

			1	2	3
1	(England) (Finland)	Sarah Walker; Nanna Vainio	21; 12	21; 17
2	(England) (Finland)	Fontaine Chapman; Airi Mikkelä	21; 16	21; 18
3	(England) (Finland)	Chloe Birch; Sonja Pekkola	21; 13	21; 14
4	(England) (Finland)	Gabby Adcock / Lauren Smith; Mathilda Lindholm / Airi Mikkelä	21; 12	21; 13
5	(England) (Finland)	Alyssa Lim / Heather Olver; Sonja Pekkola / Sanni Rautala	21; 14	21; 10

=== Estonia vs. Wales ===
Estonia
3
St. Jakobshalle, Court 6
13 February 2014, 14:00 UTC+1

Wales
2

			1	2	3
1	(Estonia) (Wales)	Laura Vana; Carissa Turner	16; 21	22; 20	21; 19
2	(Estonia) (Wales)	Karoliine Hõim; Aimee Moran	15; 21	21; 16	21; 8
3	(Estonia) (Wales)	Kristin Kuuba; Jordan Hart	19; 21	17; 21
4	(Estonia) (Wales)	Kristin Kuuba / Helina Rüütel; Sarah Thomas / Carissa Turner	15; 21	18; 21
5	(Estonia) (Wales)	Kati-Kreet Marran / Sale-Liis Teesalu; Jordan Hart / Aimee Moran	21; 11	17; 21	21; 9
