= 2014 European Men's Team Badminton Championships group stage =

This article lists the full results for group stage of 2014 European Men's Team Badminton Championships. The group stage was held from 11 to 13 February 2014.

== Group 1 ==
Pos	Team	Pld	W	L	MF	MA	MD	GF	GA	GD	PF	PA	PD	Pts	Qualification	Denmark	Czech Republic	Ireland	Slovakia
1	Denmark	3	3	0	15	0	+15	30	1	+29	647	397	+250	3	Knockout stage	—	5–0	5–0	5–0
2	Czech Republic	3	2	1	8	7	+1	17	19	−2	612	630	−18	2			—	3–2	5–0
3	Ireland	3	1	2	7	8	−1	16	17	−1	591	549	+42	1				—	5–0
4	Slovakia	3	0	3	0	15	−15	4	30	−26	428	702	−274	0					—

Source: BWF

=== Denmark vs. Czech Republic ===
Denmark
5
St. Jakobshalle, Court 1
11 February 2014, 10:00 UTC+1

Czech Republic
0

			1	2	3
1	(Denmark) (Czech Republic)	Hans-Kristian Vittinghus; Petr Koukal	21; 16	17; 21	21; 16
2	(Denmark) (Czech Republic)	Viktor Axelsen; Jan Fröhlich	21; 16	21; 8
3	(Denmark) (Czech Republic)	Emil Holst; Jakub Bitman	21; 16	21; 15
4	(Denmark) (Czech Republic)	Mads Conrad-Petersen / Mads Pieler Kolding; Jakub Bitman / Jan Fröhlich	21; 8	21; 10
5	(Denmark) (Czech Republic)	Emil Holst / Anders Skaarup Rasmussen; Pavel Florián / Ondřej Kopřiva	21; 7	21; 18

=== Slovakia vs. Ireland ===
Slovakia
0
St. Jakobshalle, Court 7
11 February 2014, 18:00 UTC+1

Ireland
5

			1	2	3
1	(Slovakia) (Republic of Ireland)	Jarolím Vícen; Scott Evans	19; 21	22; 20	7; 21
2	(Slovakia) (Republic of Ireland)	Matej Hliničan; Jonathan Dolan	12; 21	14; 21
3	(Slovakia) (Republic of Ireland)	Juraj Vachálek; Tony Stephenson	13; 21	6; 21
4	(Slovakia) (Republic of Ireland)	Matej Hliničan / Jarolím Vícen; Jonathan Dolan / Sam Magee	9; 21	10; 21
5	(Slovakia) (Republic of Ireland)	Dávid Balucha / Juraj Vachálek; Scott Evans / Tony Stephenson	13; 21	15; 21

=== Denmark vs. Slovakia ===
Denmark
5
St. Jakobshalle, Court 10
12 February 2014, 14:00 UTC+1

Slovakia
0

			1	2	3
1	(Denmark) (Slovakia)	Hans-Kristian Vittinghus; Jarolím Vícen	21; 6	21; 16
2	(Denmark) (Slovakia)	Emil Holst; Matej Hliničan	21; 18	21; 7
3	(Denmark) (Slovakia)	Anders Skaarup Rasmussen; Dávid Balucha	21; 13	21; 11
4	(Denmark) (Slovakia)	Kim Astrup / Anders Skaarup Rasmussen; Matej Hliničan / Jarolím Vícen	21; 13	21; 10
5	(Denmark) (Slovakia)	Emil Holst / Mads Pieler Kolding; Dávid Balucha / Juraj Vachálek	21; 4	21; 7

=== Czech Republic vs. Ireland ===
Czech Republic
3
St. Jakobshalle, Court 9
12 February 2014, 18:00 UTC+1

Ireland
2

			1	2	3
1	(Czech Republic) (Republic of Ireland)	Petr Koukal; Scott Evans	16; 21	16; 21
2	(Czech Republic) (Republic of Ireland)	Jan Fröhlich; Jonathan Dolan	11; 21	21; 18	21; 12
3	(Czech Republic) (Republic of Ireland)	Jakub Bitman; Tony Stephenson	21; 17	21; 12
4	(Czech Republic) (Republic of Ireland)	Pavel Florián / Ondřej Kopřiva; Jonathan Dolan / Sam Magee	12; 21	6; 21
5	(Czech Republic) (Republic of Ireland)	Jakub Bitman / Petr Koukal; Scott Evans / Tony Stephenson	21; 16	12; 21	21; 19

=== Czech Republic vs. Slovakia ===
Czech Republic
5
St. Jakobshalle, Court 7
13 February 2014, 14:00 UTC+1

Slovakia
0

			1	2	3
1	(Czech Republic) (Slovakia)	Petr Koukal; Jarolím Vícen	21; 16	23; 21
2	(Czech Republic) (Slovakia)	Jan Fröhlich; Matej Hliničan	19; 21	21; 10	21; 9
3	(Czech Republic) (Slovakia)	Pavel Florián; Juraj Vachálek	15; 21	21; 12	21; 9
4	(Czech Republic) (Slovakia)	Pavel Florián / Ondřej Kopřiva; Matej Hliničan / Jarolím Vícen	16; 21	21; 16	21; 15
5	(Czech Republic) (Slovakia)	Jakub Bitman / Petr Koukal; Dávid Balucha / Juraj Vachálek	21; 2	21; 10

=== Denmark vs. Ireland ===
Denmark
5
St. Jakobshalle, Court 10
13 February 2014, 14:00 UTC+1

Ireland
0

			1	2	3
1	(Denmark) (Republic of Ireland)	Hans-Kristian Vittinghus; Scott Evans	21; 17	21; 19
2	(Denmark) (Republic of Ireland)	Viktor Axelsen; Jonathan Dolan	21; 16	21; 12
3	(Denmark) (Republic of Ireland)	Emil Holst; Tony Stephenson	21; 17	21; 17
4	(Denmark) (Republic of Ireland)	Mads Conrad-Petersen / Mads Pieler Kolding; Jonathan Dolan / Sam Magee	21; 6	21; 16
5	(Denmark) (Republic of Ireland)	Kim Astrup / Anders Skaarup Rasmussen; Scott Evans / Tony Stephenson	21; 14	21; 7

== Group 2 ==
Pos	Team	Pld	W	L	MF	MA	MD	GF	GA	GD	PF	PA	PD	Pts	Qualification	Germany	Slovenia	Bulgaria	Switzerland
1	Germany	3	3	0	14	1	+13	29	2	+27	644	345	+299	3	Knockout stage	—	4–1	5–0	5–0
2	Slovenia	3	2	1	9	6	+3	19	15	+4	604	614	−10	2			—	4–1	4–1
3	Bulgaria	3	1	2	5	10	−5	12	20	−8	544	624	−80	1				—	4–1
4	Switzerland (H)	3	0	3	2	13	−11	5	28	−23	471	680	−209	0					—

Source: BWF
(H) Host

=== Germany vs. Bulgaria ===
Germany
5
St. Jakobshalle, Court 4
11 February 2014, 10:00 UTC+1

Bulgaria
0

			1	2	3
1	(Germany) (Bulgaria)	Dieter Domke; Stiliyan Makarski	21; 14	21; 12
2	(Germany) (Bulgaria)	Lukas Schmidt; Ivan Rusev	21; 6	21; 6
3	(Germany) (Bulgaria)	Richard Domke; Peyo Boichinov	21; 10	21; 18
4	(Germany) (Bulgaria)	Ingo Kindervater / Max Schwenger; Blagovest Kisyov / Ivan Rusev	21; 12	21; 16
5	(Germany) (Bulgaria)	Peter Käsbauer / Josche Zurwonne; Peyo Boichinov / Stiliyan Makarski	21; 9	21; 15

=== Slovenia vs. Switzerland ===
Slovenia
4
St. Jakobshalle, Court 2
11 February 2014, 14:00 UTC+1

Switzerland
1

			1	2	3
1	(Slovenia) (Switzerland)	Iztok Utroša; Lukas Nussbaumer	21; 13	21; 11
2	(Slovenia) (Switzerland)	Alen Roj; Anthony Dumartheray	21; 11	21; 14
3	(Slovenia) (Switzerland)	Luka Petrič; Christoph Heiniger	21; 15	22; 24	21; 9
4	(Slovenia) (Switzerland)	Alen Roj / Luka Petrič; Anthony Dumartheray / Thomas Heiniger	16; 21	21; 17	17; 21
5	(Slovenia) (Switzerland)	Miha Horvat / Iztok Utroša; Christoph Heiniger / Florian Schmid	21; 15	21; 19

=== Bulgaria vs. Switzerland ===
Bulgaria
4
St. Jakobshalle, Court 2
12 February 2014, 14:00 UTC+1

Switzerland
1

			1	2	3
1	(Bulgaria) (Switzerland)	Blagovest Kisyov; Lukas Nussbaumer	21; 15	21; 16
2	(Bulgaria) (Switzerland)	Stiliyan Makarski; Christoph Heiniger	21; 18	22; 20
3	(Bulgaria) (Switzerland)	Peyo Boichinov; Mathias Bonny	21; 16	21; 14
4	(Bulgaria) (Switzerland)	Blagovest Kisyov / Ivan Rusev; Anthony Dumartheray / Thomas Heiniger	15; 21	21; 11	19; 21
5	(Bulgaria) (Switzerland)	Peyo Boichinov / Stiliyan Makarski; Florian Schmid / Gilles Tripet	21; 14	23; 21

=== Germany vs. Slovenia ===
Germany
4
St. Jakobshalle, Court 4
12 February 2014, 14:00 UTC+1

Slovenia
1

			1	2	3
1	(Germany) (Slovenia)	Marc Zwiebler; Iztok Utroša	21; 14	21; 23	14; 21
2	(Germany) (Slovenia)	Dieter Domke; Alen Roj	21; 9	21; 8
3	(Germany) (Slovenia)	Lukas Schmidt; Kek Jamnik	21; 5	21; 8
4	(Germany) (Slovenia)	Peter Käsbauer / Ingo Kindervater; Miha Horvat / Iztok Utroša	21; 10	21; 8
5	(Germany) (Slovenia)	Michael Fuchs / Johannes Schöttler; Kek Jamnik / Alen Roj	21; 10	21; 17

=== Germany vs. Switzerland ===
Germany
5
St. Jakobshalle, Court 1
13 February 2014, 18:00 UTC+1

Switzerland
0

			1	2	3
1	(Germany) (Switzerland)	Marc Zwiebler; Lukas Nussbaumer	21; 5	21; 14
2	(Germany) (Switzerland)	Michael Fuchs / Johannes Schöttler; Anthony Dumartheray / Thomas Heiniger	21; 11	21; 15
3	(Germany) (Switzerland)	Dieter Domke; Christoph Heiniger	21; 8	21; 10
4	(Germany) (Switzerland)	Ingo Kindervater / Josche Zurwonne; Mathias Bonny / Oliver Schaller	21; 5	21; 8
5	(Germany) (Switzerland)	Lukas Schmidt; Christian Kirchmayr	21; 8	21; 10

=== Bulgaria vs. Slovenia ===
Bulgaria
1
St. Jakobshalle, Court 2
13 February 2014, 18:00 UTC+1

Slovenia
4

			1	2	3
1	(Bulgaria) (Slovenia)	Blagovest Kisyov; Iztok Utroša	21; 19	20; 22	15; 21
2	(Bulgaria) (Slovenia)	Stiliyan Makarski; Alen Roj	21; 17	21; 18
3	(Bulgaria) (Slovenia)	Peyo Boichinov; Luka Petrič	15; 21	13; 21
4	(Bulgaria) (Slovenia)	Blagovest Kisyov / Ivan Rusev; Miha Horvat / Iztok Utroša	21; 23	13; 21
5	(Bulgaria) (Slovenia)	Peyo Boichinov / Stiliyan Makarski; Luka Petrič / Alen Roj	20; 22	20; 22

== Group 3 ==
Pos	Team	Pld	W	L	MF	MA	MD	GF	GA	GD	PF	PA	PD	Pts	Qualification	England	Scotland	Belgium	Iceland
1	England	3	3	0	13	2	+11	24	7	+17	614	469	+145	3	Knockout stage	—	4–1	4–1	5–0
2	Scotland	3	2	1	9	6	+3	22	12	+10	639	565	+74	2			—	3–2	5–0
3	Belgium	3	1	2	7	8	−1	15	18	−3	553	579	−26	1				—	4–1
4	Iceland	3	0	3	1	14	−13	5	29	−24	508	701	−193	0					—

Source: BWF

=== Belgium vs. Iceland ===
Belgium
4
St. Jakobshalle, Court 8
11 February 2014, 10:00 UTC+1

Iceland
1

			1	2	3
1	(Belgium) (Iceland)	Yuhan Tan; Kári Gunnarsson	21; 8	21; 14
2	(Belgium) (Iceland)	Marijn Put; Atli Jóhannesson	21; 16	21; 12
3	(Belgium) (Iceland)	Matijs Dierickx / Freek Golinski; Róbert Þór Henn / Daniel Thomsen	21; 17	21; 13
4	(Belgium) (Iceland)	Nathan Vervaeke; Jónas Baldursson	21; 17	9; 21	21; 19
5	(Belgium) (Iceland)	Nick Marcoen / Sam van den Broeck; Kári Gunnarsson / Atli Jóhannesson	21; 8	18; 21	15; 21

=== England vs. Scotland ===
England
4
St. Jakobshalle, Court 10
11 February 2014, 14:00 UTC+1

Scotland
1

			1	2	3
1	(England) (Scotland)	Rajiv Ouseph; Kieran Merrilees	21; 19	21; 11
2	(England) (Scotland)	Chris Adcock / Andrew Ellis; Martin Campbell / Patrick MacHugh	21; 9	21; 15
3	(England) (Scotland)	Toby Penty; Matthew Carder	21; 18	12; 21	21; 11
4	(England) (Scotland)	Marcus Ellis / Peter Mills; Robert Blair / Paul van Rietvelde	16; 21	20; 22
5	(England) (Scotland)	Ben Beckman; Martin Campbell	21; 15	21; 13

=== Scotland vs. Iceland ===
Scotland
5
St. Jakobshalle, Court 9
12 February 2014, 10:00 UTC+1

Iceland
0

			1	2	3
1	(Scotland) (Iceland)	Kieran Merrilees; Kári Gunnarsson	21; 16	21; 9
2	(Scotland) (Iceland)	Matthew Carder; Atli Jóhannesson	23; 25	21; 18	21; 19
3	(Scotland) (Iceland)	Martin Campbell; Jónas Baldursson	21; 16	21; 9
4	(Scotland) (Iceland)	Robert Blair / Paul Van Rietvelde; Kári Gunnarsson / Atli Jóhannesson	21; 12	21; 12
5	(Scotland) (Iceland)	Martin Campbell / Patrick MacHugh; Róbert Þór Henn / Daniel Thomsen	21; 11	21; 13

=== England vs. Belgium ===
England
4
St. Jakobshalle, Court 1
12 February 2014, 14:00 UTC+1

Belgium
1

			1	2	3
1	(England) (Belgium)	Rajiv Ouseph; Maxime Moreels	0; 1			retired
2	(England) (Belgium)	Chris Langridge / Peter Mills; Matijs Dierickx / Freek Golinski	21; 18	21; 16
3	(England) (Belgium)	Toby Penty; Marijn Put	20; 22	15; 21
4	(England) (Belgium)	Andrew Ellis / Marcus Ellis; Nick Marcoen / Sam van den Broeck	21; 10	21; 16
5	(England) (Belgium)	Ben Beckman; Nathan Vervaeke	21; 11	21; 18

=== Scotland vs. Belgium ===
Scotland
3
St. Jakobshalle, Court 2
13 February 2014, 10:00 UTC+1

Belgium
2

			1	2	3
1	(Scotland) (Belgium)	Kieran Merrilees; Yuhan Tan	21; 14	16; 15		retired
2	(Scotland) (Belgium)	Matthew Carder; Marijn Put	18; 21	21; 18	19; 21
3	(Scotland) (Belgium)	Martin Campbell; Nathan Vervaeke	21; 12	21; 17
4	(Scotland) (Belgium)	Robert Blair / Paul van Rietvelde; Nick Marcoen / Sam van den Broeck	21; 11	21; 17
5	(Scotland) (Belgium)	Martin Campbell / Patrick MacHugh; Matijs Dierickx / Freek Golinski	21; 14	10; 21	21; 8

=== England vs. Iceland ===
England
5
St. Jakobshalle, Court 3
13 February 2014, 10:00 UTC+1

Iceland
0

			1	2	3
1	(England) (Iceland)	Toby Penty; Kári Gunnarsson	21; 15	26; 28	21; 6
2	(England) (Iceland)	Rhys Walker; Atli Jóhannesson	22; 20	21; 19
3	(England) (Iceland)	Ben Beckman; Róbert Þór Henn	21; 12	21; 17
4	(England) (Iceland)	Chris Langridge / Peter Mills; Jónas Baldursson / Atli Jóhannesson	21; 6	21; 10
5	(England) (Iceland)	Marcus Ellis / Tom Wolfenden; Róbert Þór Henn / Daniel Thomsen	21; 12	21; 16

== Group 4 ==
Pos	Team	Pld	W	L	MF	MA	MD	GF	GA	GD	PF	PA	PD	Pts	Qualification	Finland	Russia	Italy	Israel
1	Finland	3	3	0	13	2	+11	27	8	+19	686	532	+154	3	Knockout stage	—	3–2	5–0	5–0
2	Russia	3	2	1	12	3	+9	26	8	+18	689	473	+216	2	Knockout stage		—	5–0	5–0
3	Italy	3	1	2	3	12	−9	6	24	−18	413	607	−194	1				—	3–2
4	Israel	3	0	3	2	13	−11	7	26	−19	474	650	−176	0					—

Source: BWF

=== Israel vs. Italy ===
Israel
2
St. Jakobshalle, Court 2
11 February 2014, 10:00 UTC+1

Italy
3

			1	2	3
1	(Israel) (Italy)	Misha Zilberman; Giovanni Greco	21; 19	21; 10
2	(Israel) (Italy)	Shai Geffen; Rosario Maddaloni	15; 21	16; 21
3	(Israel) (Italy)	Alexander Bass; Marco Mondavio	15; 21	17; 21
4	(Israel) (Italy)	Alexander Bass / Lior Kroyter; Giovanni Greco / Rosario Maddaloni	19; 21	14; 21
5	(Israel) (Italy)	Ariel Shainski / Misha Zilberman; Pirmin Klotzner / Marco Mondavio	22; 20	21; 11

=== Russia vs. Finland ===
Russia
2
St. Jakobshalle, Court 9
11 February 2014, 14:00 UTC+1

Finland
3

			1	2	3
1	(Russia) (Finland)	Vladimir Ivanov; Ville Lång	21; 13	19; 21	19; 21
2	(Russia) (Finland)	Vladimir Malkov; Eetu Heino	15; 21	19; 21
3	(Russia) (Finland)	Vladimir Ivanov / Ivan Sozonov; Iikka Heino / Anton Kaisti	21; 7	21; 12
4	(Russia) (Finland)	Anatoliy Yartsev; Kalle Koljonen	21; 17	19; 21	21; 19
5	(Russia) (Finland)	Vitalij Durkin / Sergey Lunev; Eetu Heino / Ville Lång	22; 20	14; 21	18; 21

=== Russia vs. Israel ===
Russia
5
St. Jakobshalle, Court 5
12 February 2014, 10:00 UTC+1

Israel
0

			1	2	3
1	(Russia) (Israel)	Vladimir Ivanov; Misha Zilberman	13; 21	21; 16	21; 13
2	(Russia) (Israel)	Vladimir Malkov; Ariel Shainski	21; 13	21; 8
3	(Russia) (Israel)	Ivan Sozonov; Shai Geffen	21; 12	21; 11
4	(Russia) (Israel)	Evgenij Dremin / Sergey Lunev; Alexander Bass / Lior Kroyter	21; 5	21; 4
5	(Russia) (Israel)	Nikita Khakimov / Vasily Kuznetsov; Shai Geffen / Ariel Shainski	21; 10	21; 9

=== Finland vs. Italy ===
Finland
5
St. Jakobshalle, Court 8
12 February 2014, 10:00 UTC+1

Italy
0

			1	2	3
1	(Finland) (Italy)	Ville Lång; Giovanni Greco	21; 14	21; 12
2	(Finland) (Italy)	Eetu Heino; Marco Mondavio	21; 18	21; 7
3	(Finland) (Italy)	Kalle Koljonen; Pirmin Klotzner	21; 9	21; 7
4	(Finland) (Italy)	Iikka Heino / Anton Kaisti; Giovanni Greco / Marco Mondavio	21; 14	21; 7
5	(Finland) (Italy)	Eetu Heino / Ville Lång; Pirmin Klotzner / Andreas Stocker	21; 12	21; 11

=== Finland vs. Israel ===
Finland
5
St. Jakobshalle, Court 9
13 February 2014, 10:00 UTC+1

Israel
0

			1	2	3
1	(Finland) (Israel)	Ville Lång; Misha Zilberman	16; 21	22; 20	21; 15
2	(Finland) (Israel)	Eetu Heino; Shai Geffen	21; 17	21; 14
3	(Finland) (Israel)	Anton Kaisti; Alexander Bass	21; 21	21; 13	21; 10
4	(Finland) (Israel)	Iikka Heino / Anton Kaisti; Shai Geffen / Ariel Shainski	21; 6	21; 10
5	(Finland) (Israel)	Eetu Heino / Ville Lång; Alexander Bass / Lior Kroyter	21; 9	21; 15

=== Russia vs. Italy ===
Russia
5
St. Jakobshalle, Court 9
13 February 2014, 18:00 UTC+1

Italy
0

			1	2	3
1	(Russia) (Italy)	Vladimir Malkov; Giovanni Greco	21; 11	27; 25
2	(Russia) (Italy)	Nikita Khakimov; Andreas Stocker	21; 13	21; 8
3	(Russia) (Italy)	Ivan Sozonov; Pirmin Klotzner	21; 14	21; 12
4	(Russia) (Italy)	Rodion Kargaev / Anatoliy Yartsev; Lukas Osele / Kevin Strobl	21; 12	21; 6
5	(Russia) (Italy)	Vitalij Durkin / Vasily Kuznetsov; Pirmin Klotzner / Andreas Stocker	21; 7	21; 8

== Group 5 ==
Pos	Team	Pld	W	L	MF	MA	MD	GF	GA	GD	PF	PA	PD	Pts	Qualification	Sweden	Netherlands	Austria	Estonia	Wales
1	Sweden	4	4	0	16	4	+12	32	12	+20	872	668	+204	4	Knockout stage	—	3–2	5–0	5–0	3–2
2	Netherlands	4	3	1	17	3	+14	36	10	+26	896	689	+207	3			—	5–0	5–0	5–0
3	Austria	4	2	2	8	12	−4	19	25	−6	780	761	+19	2				—	4–1	4–1
4	Estonia	4	1	3	4	16	−12	14	33	−19	712	915	−203	1					—	3–2
5	Wales	4	0	4	5	15	−10	11	32	−21	620	847	−227	0						—

Source: BWF

=== Netherlands vs. Austria ===
Netherlands
5
St. Jakobshalle, Court 3
11 February 2014, 10:00 UTC+1

Austria
0

			1	2	3
1	(Netherlands) (Austria)	Eric Pang; Michael Lahnsteiner	21; 10	15; 21	21; 12
2	(Netherlands) (Austria)	Jacco Arends / Jelle Maas; David Obernosterer / Roman Zirnwald	21; 10	21; 12
3	(Netherlands) (Austria)	Erik Meijs; Luka Wraber	21; 19	15; 21	21; 15
4	(Netherlands) (Austria)	Ruud Bosch / Koen Ridder; Matthias Almer / Michael Lahnsteiner	21; 7	21; 18
5	(Netherlands) (Austria)	Nick Fransman; Daniel Graßmück	21; 15	21; 19

=== Sweden vs. Estonia ===
Sweden
5
St. Jakobshalle, Court 9
11 February 2014, 10:00 UTC+1

Estonia
0

			1	2	3
1	(Sweden) (Estonia)	Gabriel Ulldahl; Raul Must	18; 21	21; 16	21; 17
2	(Sweden) (Estonia)	Filip Michael Duwall Myhren / Nico Ruponen; Kristjan Kaljurand / Raul Käsner	21; 12	21; 15
3	(Sweden) (Estonia)	Mattias Borg; Rainer Kaljumäe	15; 21	21; 8	21; 12
4	(Sweden) (Estonia)	Patrick Lundqvist / Jonatan Nordh; Karl Kivinurm / Vahur Lukin	21; 14	21; 14
5	(Sweden) (Estonia)	Jacob Nilsson; Heiko Zoober	21; 9	21; 11

=== Netherlands vs. Sweden ===
Netherlands
2
St. Jakobshalle, Court 1
11 February 2014, 18:00 UTC+1

Sweden
3

			1	2	3
1	(Netherlands) (Sweden)	Eric Pang; Henri Hurskainen	21; 16	17; 21	14; 21
2	(Netherlands) (Sweden)	Ruud Bosch / Koen Ridder; Jonatan Nordh / Nico Ruponen	21; 19	21; 16
3	(Netherlands) (Sweden)	Erik Meijs; Gabriel Ulldahl	17; 21	6; 21
4	(Netherlands) (Sweden)	Jacco Arends / Jelle Maas; Filip Michael Duwall Myhren / Jacob Nilsson	21; 16	21; 11
5	(Netherlands) (Sweden)	Mark Caljouw; Mattias Borg	21; 19	10; 21	15; 21

=== Austria vs. Wales ===
Austria
4
St. Jakobshalle, Court 8
11 February 2014, 18:00 UTC+1

Wales
1

			1	2	3
1	(Austria) (Wales)	David Obernosterer; Daniel Font	21; 16	21; 13
2	(Austria) (Wales)	Michael Lahnsteiner; Mo Tsung Fong	21; 7	21; 6
3	(Austria) (Wales)	Daniel Graßmück / Roman Zirnwald; Joe Morgan / Nic Strange	21; 19	22; 20
4	(Austria) (Wales)	Matthias Almer; Matthew Pritchard	21; 8	21; 8
5	(Austria) (Wales)	Matthias Almer / Michael Lahnsteiner; Daniel Font / Oliver Gwilt	20; 22	21; 9	15; 21

=== Netherlands vs. Estonia ===
Netherlands
5
St. Jakobshalle, Court 9
12 February 2014, 14:00 UTC+1

Estonia
0

			1	2	3
1	(Netherlands) (Estonia)	Eric Pang; Raul Must	21; 16	21; 12
2	(Netherlands) (Estonia)	Ruud Bosch / Koen Ridder; Kristjan Kaljurand / Raul Käsner	21; 10	21; 13
3	(Netherlands) (Estonia)	Nick Fransman; Rainer Kaljumäe	21; 12	21; 9
4	(Netherlands) (Estonia)	Jacco Arends / Jelle Maas; Karl Kivinurm / Vahur Lukin	21; 12	21; 7
5	(Netherlands) (Estonia)	Mark Caljouw; Heiko Zoober	21; 15	19; 21	21; 10

=== Sweden vs. Wales ===
Sweden
3
St. Jakobshalle, Court 8
12 February 2014, 14:00 UTC+1

Wales
2

			1	2	3
1	(Sweden) (Wales)	Henri Hurskainen; Daniel Font	21; 7	21; 13
2	(Sweden) (Wales)	Gabriel Ulldahl; Mo Tsung Fong	21; 10	21; 7
3	(Sweden) (Wales)	Jacob Nilsson; Matthew Pritchard	21; 7	21; 11
4	(Sweden) (Wales)	Jonatan Nordh / Nico Ruponen; Joe Morgan / Nic Strange	18; 21	17; 21
5	(Sweden) (Wales)	Filip Michael Duwall Myhren / Jacob Nilsson; Daniel Font / Oliver Gwilt	18; 21	17; 21

=== Austria vs. Sweden ===
Austria
0
St. Jakobshalle, Court 1
13 February 2014, 10:00 UTC+1

Sweden
5

			1	2	3
1	(Austria) (Sweden)	David Obernosterer; Henri Hurskainen	18; 21	13; 21
2	(Austria) (Sweden)	Luka Wraber; Gabriel Ulldahl	15; 21	15; 21
3	(Austria) (Sweden)	Matthias Almer; Mattias Borg	9; 21	18; 21
4	(Austria) (Sweden)	Daniel Graßmück / Roman Zirnwald; Filip Michael Duwall Myhren / Nico Ruponen	19; 21	11; 21
5	(Austria) (Sweden)	Matthias Almer / Michael Lahnsteiner; Henri Hurskainen / Jonatan Nordh	18; 21	18; 21

=== Estonia vs. Wales ===
Estonia
3
St. Jakobshalle, Court 5
13 February 2014, 10:00 UTC+1

Wales
2

			1	2	3
1	(Estonia) (Wales)	Raul Must; Daniel Font	19; 21	21; 17	21; 16
2	(Estonia) (Wales)	Rainer Kaljumäe; Mo Tsung Fong	21; 13	21; 9
3	(Estonia) (Wales)	Heiko Zoober; Oliver Gwilt	21; 18	12; 21	10; 21
4	(Estonia) (Wales)	Kristjan Kaljurand / Raul Käsner; Joe Morgan / Nic Strange	21; 17	21; 14
5	(Estonia) (Wales)	Karl Kivinurm / Vahur Lukin; Daniel Font / Oliver Gwilt	18; 21	10; 21

=== Netherlands vs. Wales ===
Netherlands
5
St. Jakobshalle, Court 5
13 February 2014, 18:00 UTC+1

Wales
0

			1	2	3
1	(Netherlands) (Wales)	Erik Meijs; Daniel Font	21; 15	21; 11
2	(Netherlands) (Wales)	Ruud Bosch / Koen Ridder; Joe Morgan / Nic Strange	21; 9	21; 16
3	(Netherlands) (Wales)	Nick Fransman; Mo Tsung Fong	21; 12	21; 10
4	(Netherlands) (Wales)	Jacco Arends / Jelle Maas; Daniel Font / Oliver Gwilt	21; 17	21; 16
5	(Netherlands) (Wales)	Mark Caljouw; Matthew Pritchard	21; 5	21; 12

=== Austria vs. Estonia ===
Austria
4
St. Jakobshalle, Court 8
13 February 2014, 18:00 UTC+1

Estonia
1

			1	2	3
1	(Austria) (Estonia)	David Obernosterer; Raul Must	15; 21	18; 21
2	(Austria) (Estonia)	Michael Lahnsteiner; Rainer Kaljumaa	21; 9	17; 21	21; 8
3	(Austria) (Estonia)	Daniel Graßmück / David Obernosterer; Kristjan Kaljurand / Raul Käsner	21; 14	21; 14
4	(Austria) (Estonia)	Luka Wraber; Heiko Zoober	21; 12	21; 9
5	(Austria) (Estonia)	Matthias Almer / Michael Lahnsteiner; Karl Kivinum / Vahur Lukin	21; 10	25; 23

== Group 6 ==
Pos	Team	Pld	W	L	MF	MA	MD	GF	GA	GD	PF	PA	PD	Pts	Qualification	Ukraine	France	Lithuania	Spain	Norway
1	Ukraine	4	4	0	17	3	+14	36	12	+24	939	711	+228	4	Knockout stage	—	3–2	4–1	5–0	5–0
2	France	4	3	1	17	3	+14	37	8	+29	919	585	+334	3	Knockout stage		—	5–0	5–0	5–0
3	Lithuania	4	2	2	9	11	−2	19	24	−5	729	776	−47	2				—	4–1	4–1
4	Spain	4	1	3	4	16	−12	10	33	−23	612	855	−243	1					—	3–2
5	Norway	4	0	4	3	17	−14	9	34	−25	574	846	−272	0						—

Source: BWF

=== Spain vs. Norway ===
Spain
3
St. Jakobshalle, Court 6
11 February 2014, 10:00 UTC+1

Norway
2

			1	2	3
1	(Spain) (Norway)	Víctor Martín; Marius Myhre	14; 21	13; 21
2	(Spain) (Norway)	Manuel Vázquez; Johannes Hagen	17; 21	14; 21
3	(Spain) (Norway)	Luís Enrique Peñalver; Nikolai Svensson	21; 15	22; 20
4	(Spain) (Norway)	Pablo Sanmartin / Manuel Vázquez; Jesper Kristensen / Nikolai Svensson	21; 16	21; 17
5	(Spain) (Norway)	Víctor Martín / Luís Enrique Peñalver; Magnus Christensen / Johannes Hagen	16; 21	21; 11	21; 15

=== France vs. Lithuania ===
France
5
St. Jakobshalle, Court 10
11 February 2014, 10:00 UTC+1

Lithuania
0

			1	2	3
1	(France) (Lithuania)	Brice Leverdez; Kęstutis Navickas	21; 16	21; 13
2	(France) (Lithuania)	Lucas Corvée; Alan Plavin	24; 22	21; 17
3	(France) (Lithuania)	Thomas Rouxel; Povilas Bartušis	21; 19	17; 21	21; 12
4	(France) (Lithuania)	Bastian Kersaudy / Gaëtan Mittelheisser; Edgaras Slušnys / Laurynas Sparnauskis	21; 6	21; 7
5	(France) (Lithuania)	Baptiste Carême / Ronan Labar; Povilas Bartušis / Alan Plavin	21; 18	21; 14

=== Lithuania vs. Ukraine ===
Lithuania
1
St. Jakobshalle, Court 5
11 February 2014, 18:00 UTC+1

Ukraine
4

			1	2	3
1	(Lithuania) (Ukraine)	Kęstutis Navickas; Dmytro Zavadsky	12; 21	9; 21
2	(Lithuania) (Ukraine)	Alan Plavin; Valeriy Atrashchenkov	12; 21	9; 21
3	(Lithuania) (Ukraine)	Povilas Bartušis; Artem Pochtarov	12; 21	21; 18	21; 10
4	(Lithuania) (Ukraine)	Povilas Bartušis / Alan Plavin; Valeriy Atrashchenkov / Gennadiy Natarov	15; 21	15; 21
5	(Lithuania) (Ukraine)	Edgaras Slušnys / Laurynas Sparnauskis; Artem Pochtarov / Dmytro Zavadsky	14; 21	13; 21

=== France vs. Spain ===
France
5
St. Jakobshalle, Court 9
11 February 2014, 18:00 UTC+1

Spain
0

			1	2	3
1	(France) (Spain)	Lucas Corvée; Víctor Martín	21; 14	21; 9
2	(France) (Spain)	Thomas Rouxel; Pablo Sanmartin	21; 9	21; 13
3	(France) (Spain)	Lucas Claerbout; Luís Enrique Peñalver	21; 4	21; 12
4	(France) (Spain)	Baptiste Carême / Ronan Labar; Pablo Sanmartin / Manuel Vázquez	21; 18	21; 9
5	(France) (Spain)	Lucas Corvée / Brice Leverdez; Víctor Martín / Luís Enrique Peñalver	21; 10	21; 13

=== Spain vs. Ukraine ===
Spain
0
St. Jakobshalle, Court 3
12 February 2014, 14:00 UTC+1

Ukraine
5

			1	2	3
1	(Spain) (Ukraine)	Manuel Vázquez; Dmytro Zavadsky	7; 21	12; 21
2	(Spain) (Ukraine)	Pablo Sanmartin; Valeriy Atrashchenkov	13; 21	12; 21
3	(Spain) (Ukraine)	Luís Enrique Peñalver; Artem Pochtarov	12; 21	21; 17	10; 21
4	(Spain) (Ukraine)	Pablo Sanmartin / Manuel Vázquez; Gennadiy Natarov / Dmytro Zavadsky	13; 21	21; 16	16; 21
5	(Spain) (Ukraine)	Víctor Martín / Luís Enrique Peñalver; Valeriy Atrashchenkov / Artem Pochtarov	7; 21	11; 21

=== France vs. Norway ===
France
5
St. Jakobshalle, Court 5
12 February 2014, 14:00 UTC+1

Norway
0

			1	2	3
1	(France) (Norway)	Brice Leverdez; Marius Myhre	21; 8	21; 4
2	(France) (Norway)	Lucas Corvée; Magnus Christensen	21; 6	21; 5
3	(France) (Norway)	Thomas Rouxel; Nikolai Svensson	21; 4	21; 1
4	(France) (Norway)	Bastian Kersaudy / Gaëtan Mittelheisser; Magnus Christensen / Jesper Kristensen	21; 10	21; 9
5	(France) (Norway)	Baptiste Carême / Ronan Labar; Johannes Hagen / Nikolai Svensson	21; 1	21; 9

=== Lithuania vs. Spain ===
Lithuania
4
St. Jakobshalle, Court 7
13 February 2014, 10:00 UTC+1

Spain
1

			1	2	3
1	(Lithuania) (Spain)	Kęstutis Navickas; Víctor Martín	21; 13	21; 9
2	(Lithuania) (Spain)	Alan Plavin; Manuel Vázquez	21; 8	21; 13
3	(Lithuania) (Spain)	Povilas Bartušis; Pablo Sanmartin	21; 13	21; 18
4	(Lithuania) (Spain)	Edgaras Slušnys / Laurynas Sparnauskis; Víctor Martín / Luís Enrique Peñalver	18; 21	17; 21
5	(Lithuania) (Spain)	Povilas Bartušis / Alan Plavin; Pablo Sanmartin / Manuel Vázquez	21; 11	21; 18

=== Norway vs. Ukraine ===
Norway
0
St. Jakobshalle, Court 8
13 February 2014, 10:00 UTC+1

Ukraine
5

			1	2	3
1	(Norway) (Ukraine)	Marius Myhre; Dmytro Zavadsky	21; 17	16; 21	14; 21
2	(Norway) (Ukraine)	Magnus Christensen; Valeriy Atrashchenkov	10; 21	9; 21
3	(Norway) (Ukraine)	Nikolai Svensson; Artem Pochtarov	8; 21	11; 21
4	(Norway) (Ukraine)	Jesper Kristensen / Nikolai Svensson; Valeriy Atrashchenkov / Gennadiy Natarov	7; 21	9; 21
5	(Norway) (Ukraine)	Magnus Christensen / Johannes Hagen; Artem Pochtarov / Dmytro Zavadsky	11; 21	18; 21

=== France vs. Ukraine ===
France
2
St. Jakobshalle, Court 3
13 February 2014, 18:00 UTC+1

Ukraine
3

			1	2	3
1	(France) (Ukraine)	Brice Leverdez; Dmytro Zavadsky	21; 19	19; 21	19; 21
2	(France) (Ukraine)	Thomas Rouxel; Valeriy Atrashchenkov	21; 9	17; 21	13; 21
3	(France) (Ukraine)	Lucas Claerbout; Artem Pochtarov	21; 23	21; 15	23; 21
4	(France) (Ukraine)	Baptiste Carême / Ronan Labar; Valeriy Atrashchenkov / Gennadiy Natarov	21; 17	21; 12
5	(France) (Ukraine)	Lucas Corvée / Gaëtan Mittelheisser; Artem Pochtarov / Dmytro Zavadsky	21; 10	17; 21	14; 21

=== Lithuania vs. Norway ===
Lithuania
4
St. Jakobshalle, Court 6
13 February 2014, 18:00 UTC+1

Norway
1

			1	2	3
1	(Lithuania) (Norway)	Kęstutis Navickas; Marius Myhre	18; 21	11; 21
2	(Lithuania) (Norway)	Alan Plavin; Magnus Christensen	21; 13	21; 16
3	(Lithuania) (Norway)	Povilas Bartušis; Nikolai Svensson	21; 15	21; 9
4	(Lithuania) (Norway)	Kęstutis Navickas / Edgaras Slušnys; Magnus Christensen / Johannes Hagen	11; 21	21; 15	21; 15
5	(Lithuania) (Norway)	Povilas Bartušis / Alan Plavin; Jesper Kristensen / Marius Myhre	21; 19	21; 19
