= 2014 European Women's Team Badminton Championships knockout stage =

This article lists the full results for knockout stage of 2014 European Women's Team Badminton Championships.

== Bracket ==
Quarter-finals
14 February 2014
Denmark	3
Spain	1
Bulgaria	3
Ukraine	0
France	0
Russia	3
England	0
Germany	3

Semi-finals
15 February 2014
Denmark	3
Bulgaria	1
Russia	3
Germany	2

Final
16 February 2014
Denmark	3
Russia	0

== Quarter-finals ==
=== Denmark vs. Spain ===
Denmark
3
St. Jakobshalle, Court 1
14 February 2014, 16:00 UTC+1

Spain
1

			1	2	3
1	(Denmark) (Spain)	Line Kjærsfeldt; Carolina Marín	21; 19	16; 21	10; 21
2	(Denmark) (Spain)	Sandra-Maria Jensen; Beatriz Corrales	12; 21	21; 18	24; 22
3	(Denmark) (Spain)	Anna Thea Madsen; Clara Azurmendi	15; 21	21; 18	21; 15
4	(Denmark) (Spain)	Line Damkjær Kruse / Marie Røpke; Beatriz Corrales / Carolina Marín	21; 12	21; 17
5	(Denmark) (Spain)	Christinna Pedersen / Kamilla Rytter Juhl; Clara Azurmendi / Laura Samaniego				not played

=== Bulgaria vs. Ukraine ===
Bulgaria
3
St. Jakobshalle, Court 2
14 February 2014, 14:00 UTC+1

Ukraine
0

			1	2	3
1	(Bulgaria) (Ukraine)	Petya Nedelcheva; Marija Ulitina	21; 15	21; 13
2	(Bulgaria) (Ukraine)	Linda Zetchiri; Natalya Voytsekh	21; 11	21; 15
3	(Bulgaria) (Ukraine)	Stefani Stoeva; Yuliya Kazarinova	21; 18	21; 19
4	(Bulgaria) (Ukraine)	Petya Nedelcheva / Dimitria Popstoikova; Marija Ulitina / Natalya Voytsekh				not played
5	(Bulgaria) (Ukraine)	Gabriela Stoeva / Stefani Stoeva; Yuliya Kazarinova / Yelyzaveta Zharka				not played

=== France vs. Russia ===
France
0
St. Jakobshalle, Court 3
14 February 2014, 14:00 UTC+1

Russia
3

			1	2	3
1	(France) (Russia)	Sashina Vignes Waran; Natalia Perminova	20; 22	11; 21
2	(France) (Russia)	Perrine Le Buhanic; Ella Diehl	13; 21	9; 21
3	(France) (Russia)	Delphine Lansac; Evgeniya Kosetskaya	19; 21	23; 21	17; 21
4	(France) (Russia)	Audrey Fontaine / Perrine Le Buhanic; Anastasia Chervyakova / Nina Vislova				not played
5	(France) (Russia)	Delphine Lansac / Émilie Lefel; Ekaterina Bolotova / Olga Morozova				not played

=== England vs. Germany ===
England
0
St. Jakobshalle, Court 1
14 February 2014, 12:00 UTC+1

Germany
3

			1	2	3
1	(England) (Germany)	Sarah Walker; Karin Schnaase	11; 21	8; 21
2	(England) (Germany)	Heather Olver / Kate Robertshaw; Johanna Goliszewski / Birgit Michels	15; 21	12; 21
3	(England) (Germany)	Fontaine Chapman; Olga Konon	11; 21	19; 21
4	(England) (Germany)	Gabby Adcock / Lauren Smith; Isabel Herttrich / Carla Nelte				not played
5	(England) (Germany)	Chloe Birch; Fabienne Deprez				not played

== Semi-finals ==
=== Denmark vs. Bulgaria ===
Denmark
3
St. Jakobshalle, Court 1
15 February 2014, 17:00 UTC+1

Bulgaria
1

			1	2	3
1	(Denmark) (Bulgaria)	Line Kjærsfeldt; Petya Nedelcheva	21; 6	25; 23
2	(Denmark) (Bulgaria)	Sandra-Maria Jensen; Linda Zetchiri	21; 14	21; 15
3	(Denmark) (Bulgaria)	Mia Blichfeldt; Stefani Stoeva	15; 21	23; 21	14; 21
4	(Denmark) (Bulgaria)	Line Damkjær Kruse / Marie Røpke; Petya Nedelcheva / Linda Zetchiri	21; 16	16; 21	21; 15
5	(Denmark) (Bulgaria)	Kamilla Rytter Juhl / Christinna Pedersen; Gabriela Stoeva / Stefani Stoeva				not played

=== Russia vs. Germany ===
Russia
3
St. Jakobshalle, Court 3
15 February 2014, 15:00 UTC+1

Germany
2

			1	2	3
1	(Russia) (Germany)	Natalia Perminova; Karin Schnaase	13; 21	22; 20	16; 21
2	(Russia) (Germany)	Ella Diehl; Olga Konon	21; 19	9; 21	2; 0	retired
3	(Russia) (Germany)	Anastasia Chervyakova; Fabienne Deprez	25; 23	21; 19
4	(Russia) (Germany)	Olga Morozova / Nina Vislova; Isabel Herttrich / Carla Nelte	16; 21	21; 18	18; 21
5	(Russia) (Germany)	Ekaterina Bolotova / Anastasia Chervyakova; Johanna Goliszewski / Birgit Michels	21; 16	19; 21	21; 19

== Final ==
=== Denmark vs. Russia ===
Denmark
3
St. Jakobshalle, Court 1
16 February 2014, 15:00 UTC+1

Russia
0

			1	2	3
1	(Denmark) (Russia)	Line Kjærsfeldt; Natalia Perminova	21; 17	21; 14
2	(Denmark) (Russia)	Sandra-Maria Jensen; Ella Diehl	21; 13	21; 16
3	(Denmark) (Russia)	Mia Blichfeldt; Anastasia Chervyakova	21; 16	21; 19
4	(Denmark) (Russia)	Line Damkjær Kruse / Marie Røpke; Olga Morozova / Nina Vislova				not played
5	(Denmark) (Russia)	Kamilla Rytter Juhl / Christinna Pedersen; Ekaterina Bolotova / Anastasia Chervyakova				not played
