= 2014 European Men's Team Badminton Championships knockout stage =

This article lists the full results for knockout stage of 2014 European Men's Team Badminton Championships.

== Bracket ==
Quarter-finals
14 February 2014
Denmark	3
Russia	0
Finland	3
Sweden	0
France	2
England	3
Ukraine	1
Germany	3

Semi-finals
15 February 2014
Denmark	3
Finland	0
England	3
Germany	1

Final
16 February 2014
Denmark	3
England	1

== Quarter-finals ==
=== Denmark vs. Russia ===
Denmark
3
St. Jakobshalle, Court 2
14 February 2014, 12:00 UTC+1

Russia
0

			1	2	3
1	(Denmark) (Russia)	Hans-Kristian Vittinghus; Vladimir Ivanov	21; 16	21; 11
2	(Denmark) (Russia)	Mads Conrad-Petersen / Mads Pieler Kolding; Nikita Khakimov / Vasily Kuznetsov	21; 10	21; 11
3	(Denmark) (Russia)	Viktor Axelsen; Vladimir Malkov	21; 11	17; 21	21; 19
4	(Denmark) (Russia)	Mathias Boe / Carsten Mogensen; Vladimir Ivanov / Ivan Sozonov				not played
5	(Denmark) (Russia)	Emil Holst; Anatoliy Yartsev				not played

=== Finland vs. Sweden ===
Finland
3
St. Jakobshalle, Court 1
14 February 2014, 14:00 UTC+1

Sweden
0

			1	2	3
1	(Finland) (Sweden)	Ville Lång; Henri Hurskainen	21; 13	21; 10
2	(Finland) (Sweden)	Eetu Heino; Gabriel Ulldahl	21; 18	21; 17
3	(Finland) (Sweden)	Anton Kaisti; Mattias Borg	18; 21	21; 14	21; 16
4	(Finland) (Sweden)	Eetu Heino / Ville Lång; Henri Hurskainen / Jonathan Nordh				not played
5	(Finland) (Sweden)	Iikka Heino / Anton Kaisti; Filip Michael Duwall Myhren / Nico Ruponen				not played

=== France vs. England ===
France
2
St. Jakobshalle, Court 3
14 February 2014, 12:00 UTC+1

England
3

			1	2	3
1	(France) (England)	Brice Leverdez; Rajiv Ouseph	12; 21	17; 21
2	(France) (England)	Lucas Corvée; Toby Penty	21; 17	21; 11
3	(France) (England)	Ronan Labar / Brice Leverdez; Chris Langridge / Peter Mills	8; 21	22; 24
4	(France) (England)	Thomas Rouxel; Ben Beckman	21; 14	21; 10
5	(France) (England)	Baptiste Carême / Lucas Corvée; Chris Adcock / Andrew Ellis	20; 22	21; 14	14; 21

=== Ukraine vs. Germany ===
Ukraine
1
St. Jakobshalle, Court 1
14 February 2014, 10:00 UTC+1

Germany
3

			1	2	3
1	(Ukraine) (Germany)	Dmytro Zavadsky; Marc Zwiebler	21; 18	15; 21	21; 16
2	(Ukraine) (Germany)	Valeriy Atrashchenkov; Dieter Domke	18; 21	16; 21
3	(Ukraine) (Germany)	Artem Pochtarev; Lukas Schmidt	14; 21	17; 21
4	(Ukraine) (Germany)	Valeriy Atrashchenkov / Gennadiy Natarov; Michael Fuchs / Johannes Schöttler	12; 21	6; 21
5	(Ukraine) (Germany)	Artem Pochtarev / Dmytro Zavadsky; Peter Käsbauer / Ingo Kindervater				not played

== Semi-finals ==
=== Denmark vs. Finland ===
Denmark
3
St. Jakobshalle, Court 2
15 February 2014, 15:00 UTC+1

Finland
0

			1	2	3
1	(Denmark) (Finland)	Hans-Kristian Vittinghus; Ville Lång	21; 13	21; 15
2	(Denmark) (Finland)	Viktor Axelsen; Eetu Heino	21; 11	14; 21	21; 5
3	(Denmark) (Finland)	Mathias Boe / Carsten Mogensen; Iikka Heino / Anton Kaisti	21; 13	21; 3
4	(Denmark) (Finland)	Emil Holst; Kalle Koljonen				not played
5	(Denmark) (Finland)	Mads Conrad-Petersen / Mads Pieler Kolding; Eetu Heino / Ville Lång				not played

=== England vs. Germany ===
England
3
St. Jakobshalle, Court 1
15 February 2014, 13:00 UTC+1

Germany
1

			1	2	3
1	(England) (Germany)	Rajiv Ouseph; Marc Zwiebler	21; 13	17; 21	21; 16
2	(England) (Germany)	Chris Adcock / Andrew Ellis; Michael Fuchs / Johannes Schöttler	21; 19	21; 19
3	(England) (Germany)	Toby Penty; Dieter Domke	18; 21	17; 21
4	(England) (Germany)	Chris Langridge / Peter Mills; Peter Käsbauer / Ingo Kindervater	19; 21	21; 17	21; 18
5	(England) (Germany)	Rhys Walker; Lukas Schmidt				not played

== Final ==
=== Denmark vs. England ===
Denmark
3
St. Jakobshalle, Court 1
16 February 2014, 11:00 UTC+1

England
1

			1	2	3
1	(Denmark) (England)	Hans-Kristian Vittinghus; Rajiv Ouseph	13; 21	16; 21
2	(Denmark) (England)	Mathias Boe / Carsten Mogensen; Chris Adcock / Andrew Ellis	21; 17	19; 21	21; 14
3	(Denmark) (England)	Viktor Axelsen; Toby Penty	21; 13	21; 8
4	(Denmark) (England)	Mads Conrad-Petersen / Mads Pieler Kolding; Chris Langridge / Peter Mills	21; 15	21; 19
5	(Denmark) (England)	Emil Holst; Ben Beckman				not played
