= 2021 Sudirman Cup squads =

Badminton championship in Finland

This article will be listing the confirmed squads lists for badminton's 2021 Sudirman Cup. The dates of the rankings that will be stated and to also decide the ranking order for each event are based on the BWF World Ranking on 23 February 2021.

== Group A ==
=== China ===
20 players are scheduled to represent China.

Name	DoB/Age	Ranking of event				
Name	DoB/Age	MS	WS	MD	WD	XD
Chen Qingchen	23 June 1997 (aged 24)				2	
Chen Yufei	1 March 1998 (aged 23)		2			
Du Yue	15 February 1998 (aged 23)				7	17
Feng Yanzhe	13 February 2001 (aged 20)					229
He Bingjiao	21 March 1997 (aged 24)		9			
He Jiting	19 February 1998 (aged 23)			21		17
Huang Dongping	20 January 1995 (aged 26)					2
Jia Yifan	29 June 1997 (aged 24)				2	
Li Shifeng	9 January 2000 (aged 21)	65				
Li Wenmei	2 November 1999 (aged 21)				15	
Liu Cheng	4 January 1992 (aged 29)			22		
Liu Xuanxuan	18 June 2000 (aged 21)				21	
Lu Guangzu	19 October 1996 (aged 24)	27				
Shi Yuqi	28 February 1996 (aged 25)	10				
Tan Qiang	16 September 1998 (aged 23)			21		
Wang Yilyu	8 November 1994 (aged 26)					2
Wang Zhiyi	29 April 2000 (aged 21)		18			
Xia Yuting	29 May 2000 (aged 21)				21	
Zheng Yu	7 February 1996 (aged 25)				15	
Zhou Haodong	20 February 1998 (aged 23)			18		

=== Thailand ===
17 players are scheduled to represent Thailand.

Name	DoB/Age	Ranking of event				
Name	DoB/Age	MS	WS	MD	WD	XD
Benyapa Aimsaard	29 August 2002 (aged 19)		79		72	155
Nuntakarn Aimsaard	23 May 1999 (aged 22)				72	
Phittayaporn Chaiwan	21 February 2001 (aged 20)		31		317	186
Pornpawee Chochuwong	22 January 1998 (aged 23)		11			
Supak Jomkoh	4 September 1996 (aged 25)			137		37
Kittinupong Kedren	19 July 1996 (aged 25)			106		
Jongkolphan Kititharakul	1 March 1993 (aged 28)				8	
Busanan Ongbamrungphan	22 March 1996 (aged 25)		13			
Supissara Paewsampran	18 November 1999 (aged 21)					37
Rawinda Prajongjai	29 June 1993 (aged 28)				8	
Dechapol Puavaranukroh	20 May 1997 (aged 24)			174		2
Puttita Supajirakul	29 March 1996 (aged 25)				21	370
Sapsiree Taerattanachai	18 April 1992 (aged 29)				21	2
Natthapat Trinkajee	12 June 2000 (aged 21)			336		
Tanupat Viriyangkura	10 March 1996 (aged 25)			83		130
Kunlavut Vitidsarn	11 May 2001 (aged 20)	25				186
Kantaphon Wangcharoen	18 September 1998 (aged 23)	18				

=== Finland ===
17 players are scheduled to representing Finland.

Name	DoB/Age	Ranking of event				
Name	DoB/Age	MS	WS	MD	WD	XD
Eetu Heino	5 September 1988 (aged 33)	86				
Iikka Heino	9 January 1995 (aged 26)	215				
Anton Kaisti	17 May 1992 (aged 29)			133		127
Hanna Karkaus	16 September 1997 (aged 24)		395		352	
Kalle Koljonen	26 February 1994 (aged 27)	67				
Joonas Korhonen	23 August 1994 (aged 27)	233				
Miika Lahtinen	16 June 1999 (aged 22)			488		
Tony Lindelöf	6 January 2001 (aged 20)			463		
Mathilda Lindholm	17 July 1995 (aged 26)				531	
Nella Nyqvist	20 March 2006 (aged 15)		988			
Jenny Nyström	2 February 1994 (aged 27)				531	458
Joakim Oldorff	4 December 2002 (aged 18)	357		463		
Jere Övermark	23 June 1998 (aged 23)			488		
Jesper Paul	18 April 1999 (aged 22)	427		132		
Heidi Puro	2 October 2003 (aged 17)		–			
Nella Siilasmaa	19 December 1997 (aged 23)		326		352	
Iina Suutarinen	1 April 2000 (aged 21)				284	156

=== India ===
12 players are scheduled to representing India.

Name	DoB/Age	Ranking of event				
Name	DoB/Age	MS	WS	MD	WD	XD
Arjun M.R.	11 May 1997 (aged 24)			64		46
Malvika Bansod	15 September 2001 (aged 20)		150			
Aditi Bhatt	16 January 2003 (aged 18)					
Tanisha Crasto	5 May 2003 (aged 18)					
Dhruv Kapila	1 February 2000 (aged 21)			64		103
Srikanth Kidambi	7 February 1993 (aged 28)	13				
Rutaparna Panda	7 May 1999 (aged 22)				57	110
Ashwini Ponnappa	18 September 1989 (aged 32)				29	19
Satwiksairaj Rankireddy	13 August 2000 (aged 21)			10		19
B. Sai Praneeth	10 August 1992 (aged 29)	17				
N. Sikki Reddy	18 August 1993 (aged 28)				29	32
Chirag Shetty	4 July 1997 (aged 24)			10		

== Group B ==
=== Chinese Taipei ===
12 players are scheduled to representing Chinese Taipei. ^{[1]}

Name	DoB/Age	Ranking of event				
Name	DoB/Age	MS	WS	MD	WD	XD
Chang Ching-hui	17 May 1996 (aged 25)				40	402
Chi Yu-jen	25 June 1997 (aged 24)	150		142		
Chou Tien-chen	8 January 1990 (aged 31)	4				
Hsu Ya-ching	30 July 1991 (aged 30)				24	24
Hu Ling-fang	4 June 1998 (aged 23)				24	41
Lee Chih-chen	3 January 1998 (aged 23)				41	334
Lee Jhe-huei	20 March 1994 (aged 27)			29		24
Lu Ching-yao	7 June 1993 (aged 28)			23		59
Pai Yu-po	18 April 1991 (aged 30)		41		103	
Yang Po-han	13 March 1994 (aged 27)			23		
Yang Po-hsuan	23 August 1996 (aged 25)			29		41
Yu Chien-hui	8 May 1995 (aged 26)		725		152	310

=== South Korea ===
15 players are scheduled to represent South Korea.

Name	DoB/Age	Ranking of event				
Name	DoB/Age	MS	WS	MD	WD	XD
An Se-young	5 February 2002 (aged 19)		8			
Chae Yoo-jung	9 May 1995 (aged 26)					6
Choi Sol-gyu	5 August 1995 (aged 26)			9		72
Heo Kwang-hee	11 August 1995 (aged 26)	34				
Jeon Hyeok-jin	13 June 1995 (aged 26)	–				
Jin Yong	8 April 2003 (aged 18)	–				
Kang Min-hyuk	17 February 1999 (aged 22)			43		
Kim Ga-eun	7 February 1998 (aged 23)		17			
Kim So-yeong	9 July 1992 (aged 29)				5	
Kim Won-ho	2 June 1999 (aged 22)			54		
Kong Hee-yong	11 December 1996 (aged 24)				5	
Lee So-hee	14 June 1994 (aged 27)				4	
Na Sung-seung	28 August 1999 (aged 22)			52		
Seo Seung-jae	4 September 1997 (aged 24)			9		6
Shin Seung-chan	6 December 1994 (aged 26)				4	72

=== Tahiti ===
8 players are scheduled to represent Tahiti.

Name	DoB/Age	Ranking of event				
Name	DoB/Age	MS	WS	MD	WD	XD
Léo Cucuel	3 June 1987 (aged 34)	–		1622		
Heirautea Curet	11 March 2005 (aged 16)		–		–	–
Maeva Gaillard	4 April 2007 (aged 14)		1007			
Glen Lefoll	28 December 1991 (aged 29)	–		–		–
Jenica Lesourd	28 April 2006 (aged 15)		–		–	–
Elias Maublanc	9 May 2007 (aged 14)	–		–		–
Chloé Segrestan	22 February 2002 (aged 19)		–		–	–
Heiva Yvonet	6 June 2004 (aged 17)	–		–		–

=== Germany ===
16 players are scheduled to representing Germany.

Name	DoB/Age	Ranking of event				
Name	DoB/Age	MS	WS	MD	WD	XD
Linda Efler	23 January 1995 (aged 26)				28	40
Daniel Hess	31 July 1998 (aged 23)			157		181
Jones Ralfy Jansen	12 November 1992 (aged 28)			34		48
Stine Küspert	24 July 1999 (aged 22)				74	370
Mark Lamsfuß	19 April 1994 (aged 27)			19		15
Yvonne Li	30 May 1998 (aged 23)		25			
Isabel Lohau	17 March 1992 (aged 29)				28	15
Emma Moszczyński	7 June 2001 (aged 20)				306	126
Thuc Phuong Nguyen	23 March 2003 (aged 18)		321			
Fabian Roth	2 November 1995 (aged 25)	1293				
Kai Schäfer	13 June 1993 (aged 28)	68				
Marvin Seidel	9 November 1995 (aged 25)			19		40
Ann-Kathrin Spöri	23 April 2001 (aged 20)		185		926	1471
Jan Colin Völker	26 February 1998 (aged 23)			52		106
Franziska Volkmann	4 April 1994 (aged 27)				131	91
Max Weißkirchen	18 October 1996 (aged 24)	61				

== Group C ==
=== Indonesia ===
20 players are scheduled to representing Indonesia.

Name	DoB/Age	Ranking of event				
Name	DoB/Age	MS	WS	MD	WD	XD
Mohammad Ahsan	7 September 1987 (aged 34)			2		
Fajar Alfian	7 March 1995 (aged 26)			7		
Muhammad Rian Ardianto	13 February 1996 (aged 25)			7		
Jonatan Christie	15 September 1997 (aged 24)	7				
Marcus Fernaldi Gideon	9 March 1991 (aged 30)			1		
Anthony Sinisuka Ginting	20 October 1996 (aged 24)	5				
Praveen Jordan	26 April 1993 (aged 28)					4
Pitha Haningtyas Mentari	1 July 1999 (aged 22)					22
Melati Daeva Oktavianti	26 October 1994 (aged 26)					4
Greysia Polii	11 August 1987 (aged 34)				6	
Apriyani Rahayu	29 April 1998 (aged 23)				6	
Siti Fadia Silva Ramadhanti	16 November 2000 (aged 20)				34	
Shesar Hiren Rhustavito	3 March 1994 (aged 27)	19				
Rinov Rivaldy	12 November 1999 (aged 21)					22
Hendra Setiawan	25 August 1984 (aged 37)			2		
Ribka Sugiarto	22 January 2000 (aged 21)				34	
Kevin Sanjaya Sukamuljo	2 August 1995 (aged 26)			1		
Gregoria Mariska Tunjung	11 August 1999 (aged 22)		22			
Putri Kusuma Wardani	20 July 2002 (aged 19)		272			
Ester Nurumi Tri Wardoyo	26 August 2005 (aged 16)		–			

=== Denmark ===
17 players are scheduled to representing Denmark.

Name	DoB/Age	Ranking of event				
Name	DoB/Age	MS	WS	MD	WD	XD
Anders Antonsen	27 April 1997 (aged 24)	3				
Kim Astrup	6 March 1992 (aged 29)			15		
Viktor Axelsen	4 January 1994 (aged 27)	2				
Mia Blichfeldt	19 August 1997 (aged 24)		12			
Alexandra Bøje	6 December 1999 (aged 21)				31	18
Mathias Christiansen	20 February 1994 (aged 27)			98		18
Line Christophersen	14 January 2000 (aged 21)		50			
Maiken Fruergaard	11 May 1995 (aged 26)				16	
Rasmus Gemke	11 January 1997 (aged 24)	12				
Mads Pieler Kolding	27 January 1988 (aged 33)			125		
Amalie Magelund	13 May 2000 (aged 21)				33	79
Niclas Nøhr	2 August 1991 (aged 30)			98		45
Anders Skaarup Rasmussen	15 February 1989 (aged 32)			15		
Freja Ravn	17 February 2000 (aged 21)				33	
Frederik Søgaard	25 July 1997 (aged 24)			218		233
Sara Thygesen	20 January 1991 (aged 30)				16	45
Mathias Thyrri	29 August 1997 (aged 24)			58		78

=== NBFR ===
8 players are scheduled to representing the NBFR (National Badminton Federation of Russia).

Name	DoB/Age	Ranking of event				
Name	DoB/Age	MS	WS	MD	WD	XD
Rodion Alimov	21 April 1998 (aged 23)					20
Alina Davletova	17 July 1998 (aged 23)				32	20
Vladimir Ivanov	3 July 1987 (aged 34)			16		143
Evgeniya Kosetskaya	16 December 1994 (aged 26)		21			
Vladimir Malkov	9 April 1986 (aged 35)	77				
Ekaterina Malkova	12 December 1992 (aged 28)				32	143
Anastasiia Shapovalova	8 March 2002 (aged 19)		234			
Ivan Sozonov	6 July 1989 (aged 32)			16		

=== Canada ===
6 players are scheduled to represent Canada.

Name	DoB/Age	Ranking of event				
Name	DoB/Age	MS	WS	MD	WD	XD
Rachel Chan	15 November 2004 (aged 16)		233			
Catherine Choi	1 May 2001 (aged 20)		231		51	865
Crystal Lai	25 September 2001 (aged 20)				646	
B. R. Sankeerth	22 December 1997 (aged 23)	81		199		
Nyl Yakura	14 February 1993 (aged 28)			32		108
Brian Yang	25 November 2001 (aged 19)	43		702		405

== Group D ==
=== Japan ===
17 players are scheduled to representing Japan.

Name	DoB/Age	Ranking of event				
Name	DoB/Age	MS	WS	MD	WD	XD
Arisa Higashino	1 August 1996 (aged 25)					6
Takuro Hoki	14 August 1995 (aged 26)			14		28
Yuki Kaneko	22 July 1994 (aged 27)			30		23
Yugo Kobayashi	10 July 1995 (aged 26)			14		
Akira Koga	8 March 1994 (aged 27)			31		
Mayu Matsumoto	7 August 1995 (aged 26)				3	
Misaki Matsutomo	8 February 1992 (aged 29)					23
Nami Matsuyama	28 June 1998 (aged 23)				12	
Kento Momota	1 September 1994 (aged 27)	1				
Wakana Nagahara	9 January 1996 (aged 25)				3	28
Kenta Nishimoto	10 August 1994 (aged 27)	15				
Nozomi Okuhara	13 March 1995 (aged 26)		4			
Taichi Saito	21 April 1993 (aged 28)			31		
Chiharu Shida	29 April 1997 (aged 24)				12	
Sayaka Takahashi	29 July 1992 (aged 29)		14			
Yuta Watanabe	13 June 1997 (aged 24)			6		6
Akane Yamaguchi	6 June 1997 (aged 24)		5			

=== Malaysia ===
18 players are scheduled to representing Malaysia.

Name	DoB/Age	Ranking of event				
Name	DoB/Age	MS	WS	MD	WD	XD
Aidil Sholeh	9 January 2000 (aged 21)	140				
Cheah Yee See	18 November 1995 (aged 25)				134	29
Chen Tang Jie	5 January 1998 (aged 23)			138		60
Aaron Chia	24 February 1997 (aged 24)			9		
Eoon Qi Xuan	2 November 2000 (aged 20)		166			
Hoo Pang Ron	29 March 1998 (aged 23)			719		29
Kisona Selvaduray	1 October 1998 (aged 22)		62			
Lee Zii Jia	29 March 1998 (aged 23)	8				
Letshanaa Karupathevan	19 August 2003 (aged 18)		701			
Man Wei Chong	5 September 1999 (aged 22)			116		77
Ng Tze Yong	16 May 2000 (aged 21)	136				
Peck Yen Wei	10 February 1996 (aged 25)					60
Soh Wooi Yik	17 February 1998 (aged 23)			9		
Pearly Tan	14 March 2000 (aged 21)				30	77
Tee Kai Wun	17 April 2000 (aged 21)			93		286
Teoh Mei Xing	6 March 1997 (aged 24)				69	316
Thinaah Muralitharan	3 January 1998 (aged 23)				30	286
Yap Ling	1 April 2000 (aged 21)				69	378

=== England ===
13 players are scheduled to representing England.

Name	DoB/Age	Ranking of event				
Name	DoB/Age	MS	WS	MD	WD	XD
Chloe Birch	14 September 1995 (aged 26)		70		15	
Marcus Ellis	14 September 1989 (aged 32)			12		9
Callum Hemming	27 June 1999 (aged 22)			129		127
Abigail Holden	29 August 1999 (aged 22)		204		132	
Jessica Hopton	28 November 1996 (aged 24)				188	212
Ben Lane	13 July 1997 (aged 24)			18		35
Jessica Pugh	17 March 1997 (aged 24)					35
Ethan Rose	12 August 1992 (aged 29)	422				
Lauren Smith	1 January 2003 (aged 18)				15	9
Steven Stallwood	1 April 1999 (aged 22)			73		225
Johnnie Torjussen	24 June 1999 (aged 22)	290				
Estelle van Leeuwen	11 January 2004 (aged 17)		446			
Sean Vendy	18 May 1996 (aged 25)			18		

=== Egypt ===
6 players are scheduled to represent Egypt.

Name	DoB/Age	Ranking of event				
Name	DoB/Age	MS	WS	MD	WD	XD
Nour Ahmed Youssri	17 July 2003 (aged 18)		207		183	280
Jana Ashraf	26 November 2000 (aged 20)		212		167	216
Adham Hatem Elgamal	4 February 1998 (aged 23)	133		81		48
Doha Hany	10 September 1997 (aged 24)		112		37	48
Mohamed Mostafa Kamel	1 August 2000 (aged 21)	286		143		280
Ahmed Salah	25 November 2001 (aged 19)	187		81		81
