= Louise Seiersen =

Danish badminton player (born 1991)

Personal information
- Born: 10 January 1991 (age 35)

Sport
- Country: Denmark
- Sport: Badminton

Women's
- Highest ranking: 475 (WS) 14 Mar 2013; 259 (WD) 7 Nov 2013; 320 (XD) 17 Apr 2014
- BWF profile

Louise Seiersen (born 10 January 1991) is a Danish female badminton player.

== Achievements ==
=== BWF International Challenge/Series ===
Women's Doubles
Year	Tournament	Partner	Opponent	Score	Result
2014	Croatian International	(Denmark) Iben Bergstein	(Denmark) Julie Finne-Ipsen (Denmark) Rikke Søby Hansen	21-15, 17–21, 19–21	(silver) Runner-up
2013	Irish International	(Denmark) Louise Hansen	(Scotland) Rebekka Findlay (Scotland) Caitlin Pringle	21-17, 21–14	(gold) Winner

BWF International Challenge tournament
BWF International Series tournament
BWF Future Series tournament
