= Louise Hansen (badminton) =

Danish badminton player (born 1990)

Personal information
- Born: Louise Grimm Hansen; 12 June 1990 (age 36)

Sport
- Country: Denmark
- Sport: Badminton

Women's
- Highest ranking: 177 (WS) 8 Nov 2012; 91 (WD) 25 Oct 2012; 259 (XD) 26 Aug 2010
- BWF profile

Louise Grimm Hansen (born 12 June 1990) is a Danish female badminton player.

== Achievements ==
=== BWF International Challenge/Series ===
Women's doubles
Year	Tournament	Partner	Opponent	Score	Result
2013	Irish International	(Denmark) Louise Seiersen	(Scotland) Rebekka Findlay (Scotland) Caitlin Pringle	21–17, 21–14	(gold) Winner
2012	French International	(Denmark) Tinne Kruse	(Germany) Johanna Goliszewski (Netherlands) Judith Meulendijks	13–21, 12–21	(silver) Runner-up
2009	Slovenian International	(Denmark) Lotte Bonde	(Germany) Johanna Goliszewski (Germany) Claudia Vogelgsang	18–21, 15–21	(silver) Runner-up

Mixed doubles
Year	Tournament	Partner	Opponent	Score	Result
2011	Iceland International	(Denmark) Thomas Dew-Hattens	(Republic of Ireland) Tony Stephenson (Republic of Ireland) Sinnead Chambers	23–21, 21–13	(gold) Winner
2009	Slovenian International	(Denmark) Martin Kragh	(Austria) Peter Zauner (Austria) Simone Prutsch	23–21, 17–21, 17–21	(silver) Runner-up
2007	Hellas International	(Denmark) Jeppe Lund	(Denmark) Mads Pieler Kolding (Denmark) Line Damkjær Kruse	Walkover	(silver) Runner-up

BWF International Challenge tournament
BWF International Series tournament
BWF Future Series tournament
