= National Badminton Federation of Russia =

Russian badminton governing body

- Национальная Федерация Бадминтона России
- Formation: 1992
- Type: National Sport Association
- Legal status: suspended
- Headquarters: Moscow, Russia
- President: Sergei Mikhailovich Shakhrai
- Affiliations: Badminton Europe (suspended), BWF (suspended)
- Website: badm.ru

The National Badminton Federation of Russia (NBFR) (Russian: Национальная Федерация Бадминтона России, romanized: Natsionalnaya Federatsiya Badmintona Rossii) is the governing body for the sport of badminton in Russia. Based in Moscow, the NBFR has been a member since 1992 of Badminton Europe, the regional organization for the Badminton World Federation. The organization was established as one of the successors to CIS Badminton (1991–1992) and USSR Badminton Federation (1962–1991) after the dissolution of the Soviet Union. The NFBR became the sole administrator for the Russia national badminton team when the Russian Badminton Federation (RBF) was dissolved by the Russian Olympic Committee in 2005.

After the 2022 Russian invasion of Ukraine, the Badminton World Federation (BWF) banned all Russian players and officials from BWF events, and cancelled all BWF tournaments in Russia. Badminton Europe declared the National Badminton Federation of Russia not in Good Standing.

In August 2023, BWF decided that effective on 26 February 2024, Russian badminton athletes, together with Belarusian that also banned due to Russian invasion, can participate further BWF tournaments under neutral identities. A framework to establish, review and ensure eligibility for neutral participants has created. On 30 November 2023, BWF suspended the membership of National Badminton Federation of Russia, due to their breach of membership requirements as they included regional badminton clubs of Donetsk, Kherson, Luhansk and Zaporizhzhia under their jurisdiction.

== Tournaments ==
- Russian Open
- White Nights

== Presidents ==
Name	Years
Sergei Mikhailovich Shakhrai	2005–present
