= Rebekka Findlay =

Scottish badminton player (born 1994)

Personal information
- Born: 11 January 1994 (age 32) Paisley, Scotland
- Height: 1.60 m (5 ft 3 in)
- Weight: 54 kg (119 lb)

Sport
- Country: Scotland
- Sport: Badminton
- Handedness: Right
- Coached by: Diana Koleva; Julie Hogg; David Forbes

Women's
- Highest ranking: 307 (WS) 7 Aug 2014; 89 (WD) 3 Jul 2014; 202 (XD) 29 Oct 2015
- Current ranking: 261 (WD); 231 (XD) (8 Sep 2016)
- BWF profile

Rebekka Findlay (born 11 January 1994) is a Scottish female badminton player. She competed at the 2014 Commonwealth Games in Glasgow, Scotland.

== Achievements ==
=== BWF International Challenge/Series ===
Women's Doubles
Year	Tournament	Partner	Opponent	Score	Result
2014	Portugal International	(Scotland) Caitlin Pringle	(Wales) Sarah Thomas (Wales) Carissa Turner	17-21, 15–21	(silver) Runner-up
2013	Irish International	(Scotland) Caitlin Pringle	(Denmark) Louise Hansen (Denmark) Louise Seiersen	17-21, 14–21	(silver) Runner-up

BWF International Challenge tournament
BWF International Series tournament
BWF Future Series tournament
