= Caitlin Pringle =

Scottish badminton player (born 1993)

Personal information
- Born: 4 December 1993 (age 32) Glasgow, Scotland
- Height: 1.83 m (6 ft 0 in)
- Weight: 74 kg (163 lb)

Sport
- Country: Scotland
- Sport: Badminton
- Handedness: Right
- Coached by: Yvette Yun Luo; John Quinn; Iain Pringle

Women's
- Highest ranking: 640 (WS) 14 Mar 2013; 89 (WD) 3 Jul 2014; 176 (XD) 26 Sep 2013
- Current ranking: 363 (WD) (8 Sep 2016)
- BWF profile

Caitlin Pringle (born 4 December 1993) is a Scottish female badminton player. She competed at the 2014 Commonwealth Games in Glasgow, Scotland.

== Achievements ==
=== BWF International Challenge/Series ===
Women's Doubles
Year	Tournament	Partner	Opponent	Score	Result
2014	Portugal International	(Scotland) Rebekka Findlay	(Wales) Sarah Thomas (Wales) Carissa Turner	17-21, 15–21	(silver) Runner-up
2013	Irish International	(Scotland) Rebekka Findlay	(Denmark) Louise Hansen (Denmark) Louise Seiersen	17-21, 14–21	(silver) Runner-up

BWF International Challenge tournament
BWF International Series tournament
BWF Future Series tournament
