= 2014 European Men's and Women's Team Badminton Championships =

Tournament details
- Dates: 11–16 February 2014
- Venue: St. Jakobshalle
- Location: Basel, Switzerland

The 2014 European Men's and Women's Team Badminton Championships was held in Basel, Switzerland, from February 11 to February 16, 2014.

== Medalists ==
Event	Gold	Silver	Bronze
Men's Team	Denmark	England	Finland Germany
Women's Team	Denmark	Russia	Bulgaria Germany

== Men's team ==
=== Group stage ===
==== Group 1 ====
Pos	Team	Pld	W	L	MF	MA	MD	GF	GA	GD	PF	PA	PD	Pts	Qualification	Denmark	Czech Republic	Ireland	Slovakia
1	Denmark	3	3	0	15	0	+15	30	1	+29	647	397	+250	3	Knockout stage	—	5–0	5–0	5–0
2	Czech Republic	3	2	1	8	7	+1	17	19	−2	612	630	−18	2			—	3–2	5–0
3	Ireland	3	1	2	7	8	−1	16	17	−1	591	549	+42	1				—	5–0
4	Slovakia	3	0	3	0	15	−15	4	30	−26	428	702	−274	0					—

Source: BWF

==== Group 2 ====
Pos	Team	Pld	W	L	MF	MA	MD	GF	GA	GD	PF	PA	PD	Pts	Qualification	Germany	Slovenia	Bulgaria	Switzerland
1	Germany	3	3	0	14	1	+13	29	2	+27	644	345	+299	3	Knockout stage	—	4–1	5–0	5–0
2	Slovenia	3	2	1	9	6	+3	19	15	+4	604	614	−10	2			—	4–1	4–1
3	Bulgaria	3	1	2	5	10	−5	12	20	−8	544	624	−80	1				—	4–1
4	Switzerland (H)	3	0	3	2	13	−11	5	28	−23	471	680	−209	0					—

Source: BWF
(H) Host

==== Group 3 ====
Pos	Team	Pld	W	L	MF	MA	MD	GF	GA	GD	PF	PA	PD	Pts	Qualification	England	Scotland	Belgium	Iceland
1	England	3	3	0	13	2	+11	24	7	+17	614	469	+145	3	Knockout stage	—	4–1	4–1	5–0
2	Scotland	3	2	1	9	6	+3	22	12	+10	639	565	+74	2			—	3–2	5–0
3	Belgium	3	1	2	7	8	−1	15	18	−3	553	579	−26	1				—	4–1
4	Iceland	3	0	3	1	14	−13	5	29	−24	508	701	−193	0					—

Source: BWF

==== Group 4 ====
Pos	Team	Pld	W	L	MF	MA	MD	GF	GA	GD	PF	PA	PD	Pts	Qualification	Finland	Russia	Italy	Israel
1	Finland	3	3	0	13	2	+11	27	8	+19	686	532	+154	3	Knockout stage	—	3–2	5–0	5–0
2	Russia	3	2	1	12	3	+9	26	8	+18	689	473	+216	2	Knockout stage		—	5–0	5–0
3	Italy	3	1	2	3	12	−9	6	24	−18	413	607	−194	1				—	3–2
4	Israel	3	0	3	2	13	−11	7	26	−19	474	650	−176	0					—

Source: BWF

==== Group 5 ====
Pos	Team	Pld	W	L	MF	MA	MD	GF	GA	GD	PF	PA	PD	Pts	Qualification	Sweden	Netherlands	Austria	Estonia	Wales
1	Sweden	4	4	0	16	4	+12	32	12	+20	872	668	+204	4	Knockout stage	—	3–2	5–0	5–0	3–2
2	Netherlands	4	3	1	17	3	+14	36	10	+26	896	689	+207	3			—	5–0	5–0	5–0
3	Austria	4	2	2	8	12	−4	19	25	−6	780	761	+19	2				—	4–1	4–1
4	Estonia	4	1	3	4	16	−12	14	33	−19	712	915	−203	1					—	3–2
5	Wales	4	0	4	5	15	−10	11	32	−21	620	847	−227	0						—

Source: BWF

==== Group 6 ====
Pos	Team	Pld	W	L	MF	MA	MD	GF	GA	GD	PF	PA	PD	Pts	Qualification	Ukraine	France	Lithuania	Spain	Norway
1	Ukraine	4	4	0	17	3	+14	36	12	+24	939	711	+228	4	Knockout stage	—	3–2	4–1	5–0	5–0
2	France	4	3	1	17	3	+14	37	8	+29	919	585	+334	3	Knockout stage		—	5–0	5–0	5–0
3	Lithuania	4	2	2	9	11	−2	19	24	−5	729	776	−47	2				—	4–1	4–1
4	Spain	4	1	3	4	16	−12	10	33	−23	612	855	−243	1					—	3–2
5	Norway	4	0	4	3	17	−14	9	34	−25	574	846	−272	0						—

Source: BWF

=== Ranking of second-placed teams ===
Pos	Grp	Team	Pld	W	L	MF	MA	MD	GF	GA	GD	PF	PA	PD	Pts	Qualification
1	6	France	4	3	1	17	3	+14	36	12	+24	939	711	+228	3	Knockout stage
2	4	Russia	3	2	1	12	3	+9	26	8	+18	689	473	+216	2	Knockout stage
3	5	Netherlands	4	3	1	17	3	+14	36	10	+26	896	689	+207	3	
4	3	Scotland	3	2	1	9	6	+3	22	12	+10	639	565	+74	2	
5	2	Slovenia	3	2	1	9	6	+3	19	15	+4	604	614	−10	2	
6	1	Czech Republic	3	2	1	8	7	+1	17	19	−2	612	630	−18	2	

Source: BWF

=== Knockout stage ===
Quarter-finals
14 February 2014
Denmark	3
Russia	0
Finland	3
Sweden	0
France	2
England	3
Ukraine	1
Germany	3

Semi-finals
15 February 2014
Denmark	3
Finland	0
England	3
Germany	1

Final
16 February 2014
Denmark	3
England	1

== Women's team ==
=== Group stage ===
==== Group 1 ====
Pos	Team	Pld	W	L	MF	MA	MD	GF	GA	GD	PF	PA	PD	Pts	Qualification	Denmark	Czech Republic	Turkey	Hungary
1	Denmark	3	3	0	15	0	+15	28	0	+28	584	346	+238	3	Knockout stage	—	5–0	5–0	5–0
2	Czech Republic	3	2	1	9	6	+3	16	15	+1	552	512	+40	2			—	5–0	4–1
3	Turkey	3	1	2	4	11	−7	9	20	−11	442	569	−127	1				—	4–1
4	Hungary	3	0	3	2	13	−11	8	26	−18	523	674	−151	0					—

Source: BWF

==== Group 2 ====
Pos	Team	Pld	W	L	MF	MA	MD	GF	GA	GD	PF	PA	PD	Pts	Qualification	Germany	Spain	Iceland	Latvia
1	Germany	3	3	0	13	2	+11	27	6	+21	680	448	+232	3	Knockout stage	—	3–2	5–0	5–0
2	Spain	3	2	1	10	5	+5	22	12	+10	665	549	+116	2	Knockout stage		—	3–2	5–0
3	Iceland	3	1	2	6	9	−3	12	19	−7	481	609	−128	1				—	4–1
4	Latvia	3	0	3	1	14	−13	4	28	−24	439	659	−220	0					—

Source: BWF

==== Group 3 ====
Pos	Team	Pld	W	L	MF	MA	MD	GF	GA	GD	PF	PA	PD	Pts	Qualification	Bulgaria	France	Ireland	Netherlands
1	Bulgaria	3	3	0	13	2	+11	27	8	+19	720	488	+232	3	Knockout stage	—	4–1	5–0	4–1
2	France	3	2	1	9	6	+3	20	14	+6	638	612	+26	2	Knockout stage		—	4–1	4–1
3	Ireland	3	1	2	4	11	−7	11	22	−11	511	651	−140	1				—	3–2
4	Netherlands	3	0	3	4	11	−7	9	23	−14	507	625	−118	0					—

Source: BWF

==== Group 4 ====
Pos	Team	Pld	W	L	MF	MA	MD	GF	GA	GD	PF	PA	PD	Pts	Qualification	Russia	Switzerland	Scotland	Belgium
1	Russia	3	3	0	12	3	+9	25	8	+17	655	472	+183	3	Knockout stage	—	4–1	3–2	5–0
2	Switzerland (H)	3	2	1	7	8	−1	17	19	−2	639	685	−46	2			—	3–2	3–2
3	Scotland	3	1	2	7	8	−1	15	16	−1	529	567	−38	1				—	3–2
4	Belgium	3	0	3	4	11	−7	10	24	−14	575	674	−99	0					—

Source: BWF
(H) Host

==== Group 5 ====
Pos	Team	Pld	W	L	MF	MA	MD	GF	GA	GD	PF	PA	PD	Pts	Qualification	England	Ukraine	Estonia	Wales	Finland
1	England	4	4	0	20	0	+20	40	3	+37	884	628	+256	4	Knockout stage	—	5–0	5–0	5–0	5–0
2	Ukraine	4	3	1	15	5	+10	32	16	+16	942	807	+135	3	Knockout stage		—	5–0	5–0	5–0
3	Estonia	4	2	2	6	14	−8	16	33	−17	842	928	−86	2				—	3–2	3–2
4	Wales	4	1	3	5	15	−10	14	32	−18	756	903	−147	1					—	3–2
5	Finland	4	0	4	4	16	−12	15	33	−18	784	942	−158	0						—

Source: BWF

=== Ranking of second-placed teams ===
Pos	Grp	Team	Pld	W	L	MF	MA	MD	GF	GA	GD	PF	PA	PD	Pts	Qualification
1	5	Ukraine	4	3	1	15	5	+10	32	16	+16	942	807	+135	3	Knockout stage
2	2	Spain	3	2	1	10	5	+5	22	12	+10	665	549	+116	2	Knockout stage
3	3	France	3	2	1	9	6	+3	20	14	+6	638	612	+26	2	Knockout stage
4	1	Czech Republic	3	2	1	9	6	+3	16	15	+1	552	512	+40	2	
5	4	Switzerland (H)	3	2	1	7	8	−1	17	19	−2	639	685	−46	2	

Source: BWF
(H) Host

=== Knockout stage ===
Quarter-finals
14 February 2014
Denmark	3
Spain	1
Bulgaria	3
Ukraine	0
France	0
Russia	3
England	0
Germany	3

Semi-finals
15 February 2014
Denmark	3
Bulgaria	1
Russia	3
Germany	2

Final
16 February 2014
Denmark	3
Russia	0
