= Natalya Voytsekh =

Ukrainian badminton player (born 1992)

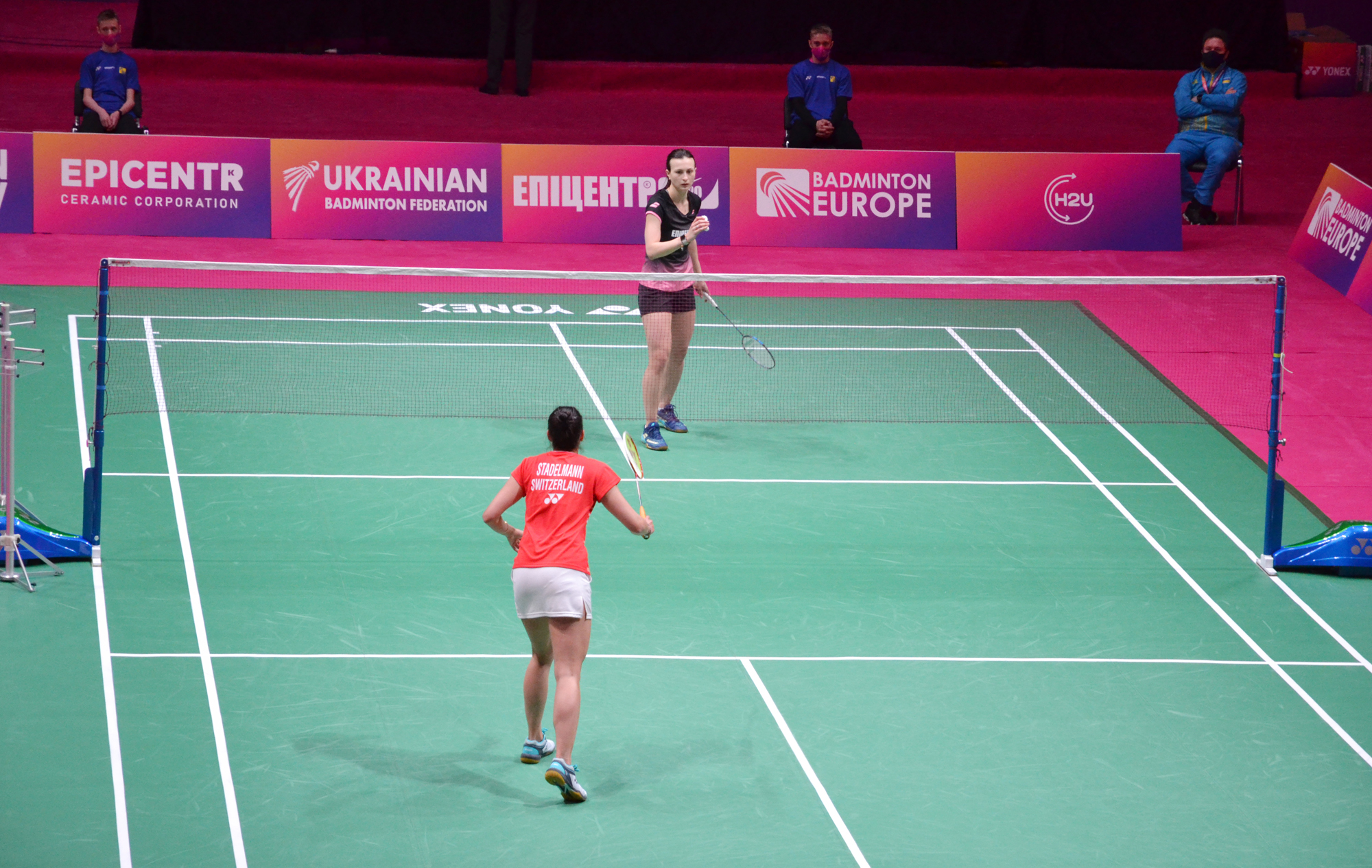
- Voytsekh (top) at the 2021 European Badminton Championships

Personal information
- Born: Natalya Aleksandrivna Voytsekh; 21 June 1992 (age 34) Dnipropetrovsk, Ukraine
- Height: 1.75 m (5 ft 9 in)
- Weight: 60 kg (132 lb)

Sport
- Country: Ukraine
- Sport: Badminton
- Handedness: Left
- Coached by: Mikhail Mizin; Vladislav Druzchenko

Women's singles & doubles
- Highest ranking: 81 (WS 2 November 2017); 42 (WD with Marija Ulitina 11 August 2011); 93 (XD with Gennadiy Natarov 30 June 2016)
- BWF profile
Medal record
Women's badminton
Representing Ukraine
European Junior Championships
Bronze medal – third place	2011 Vantaa	Mixed team

Natalya Aleksandrivna Voytsekh (Ukrainian: Наталія Олександрівна Войцех; born 21 June 1992) is a Ukrainian badminton player. She competed at the 2015 Baku European Games.

== Achievements ==
=== BWF International Challenge/Series ===
Women's singles
Year	Tournament	Opponent	Score	Result
2010	Slovak Open	(Ukraine) Marija Ulitina	8–21 13–21	(silver) Runner-up
2012	Slovak Open	(Belarus) Alesia Zaitsava	17–21, 13–21	(silver) Runner-up
2016	Slovak Open	(Indonesia) Priskila Siahaya	11–9, 11–3, 10–12, 13–11	(gold) Winner
2017	Kharkiv International	(India) Sri Krishna Priya Kudaravalli	18–21, 21–16, 23–21	(gold) Winner

Women's doubles
Year	Tournament	Partner	Opponent	Score	Result
2009	Slovak Open	(Ukraine) Marija Ulitina	(Denmark) Maria Lykke Andersen (Denmark) Karina Sørensen	17–21, 10–21	(silver) Runner-up
2010	Kharkiv International	(Ukraine) Marija Ulitina	(Ukraine) Anna Kobceva (Ukraine) Elena Prus	23–21, 21–12	(gold) Winner
2010	Slovak Open	(Ukraine) Marija Ulitina	(Netherlands) Selena Piek (Netherlands) Iris Tabeling	10–21, 18–21	(silver) Runner-up
2011	Estonian International	(Ukraine) Marija Ulitina	(Netherlands) Selena Piek (Netherlands) Iris Tabeling	12–21, 16–21	(silver) Runner-up
2011	Lithuanian International	(Ukraine) Marija Ulitina	(Ukraine) Anna Kobceva (Ukraine) Elena Prus	12–21, 19–21	(silver) Runner-up
2013	Romanian International	(Ukraine) Yelyzaveta Zharka	(Russia) Irina Khlebko (Russia) Ksenia Polikarpova	18–21, 21–23	(silver) Runner-up
2013	Slovenian International	(Ukraine) Yelyzaveta Zharka	(Netherlands) Alida Chen (Netherlands) Soraya de Visch Eijbergen	21–11, 14–21, 14–21	(silver) Runner-up
2014	Kharkiv International	(Ukraine) Yelyzaveta Zharka	(Ukraine) Yuliya Kazarinova (Ukraine) Mariya Rud	11–8, 11–7, 6–11, 11–7	(gold) Winner
2016	Polish International	(Ukraine) Yelyzaveta Zharka	(India) Sanjana Santosh (India) Arathi Sara Sunil	21–19, 19–21, 14–21	(silver) Runner-up
2017	Kharkiv International	(Ukraine) Marija Ulitina	(Germany) Johanna Goliszewski (Germany) Lara Käpplein	15–21, 14–21	(silver) Runner-up

BWF International Challenge tournament
BWF International Series tournament
BWF Future Series tournament
