= Eetu Heino =

Finnish badminton player (born 1988)

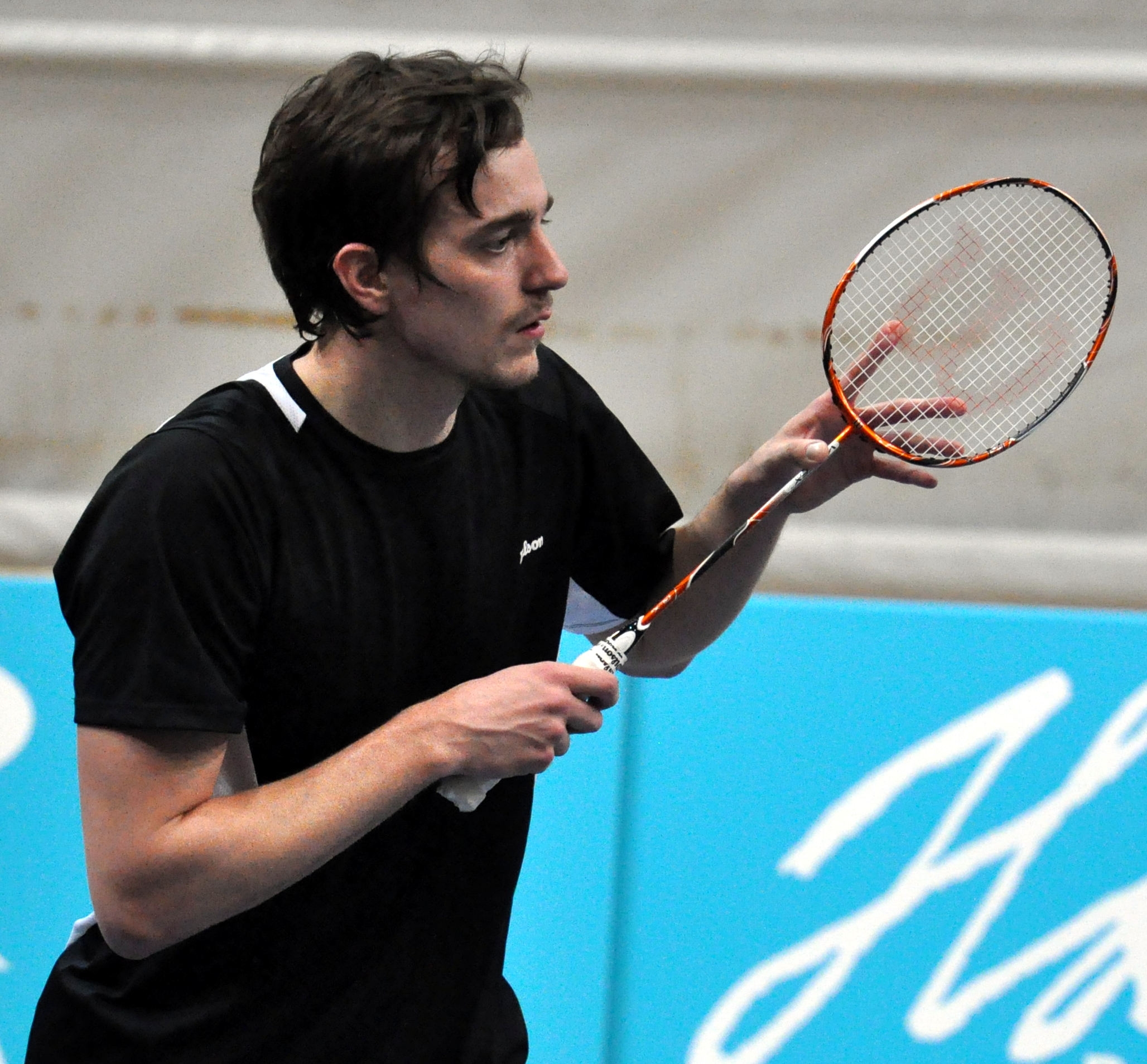

Personal information
- Born: Eetu Antti Oskari Heino; 5 September 1988 (age 38) Kaarina, Finland
- Height: 1.85 m (6 ft 1 in)

Sport
- Country: Finland
- Sport: Badminton
- Handedness: Right

Men's singles
- Highest ranking: 66 (25 June 2015)
- BWF profile
Medal record
Men's badminton
Representing Finland
European Men's Team Championships
Bronze medal – third place	2014 Basel	Men's team

Eetu Antti Oskari Heino (born 5 September 1988) is a Finnish badminton player. He started playing badminton at his school in Pargas, then in 2006, he joined the Finnish national badminton team. In 2014, he won a bronze medal at the European Men's Team Championships in Basel, Switzerland.

== Achievements ==
=== BWF International Challenge/Series ===
Men's singles
Year	Tournament	Opponent	Score	Result
2013	Estonian International	(Japan) Kento Momota	22–20, 15–21, 15–21	(silver) Runner-up
2013	White Nights	(Finland) Ville Lång	21–14, 17–21, 21–9	(gold) Winner
2014	Finnish International	(Finland) Kasper Lehikoinen	21–14, 21–17	(gold) Winner
2015	Finnish Open	(Russia) Vladimir Malkov	18–21, 15–21	(silver) Runner-up
2016	Polish Open	(France) Thomas Rouxel	11–21, 16–21	(silver) Runner-up

BWF International Challenge tournament
BWF International Series tournament
