= Marija Ulitina =

Ukrainian badminton player

Mariia Ulitina
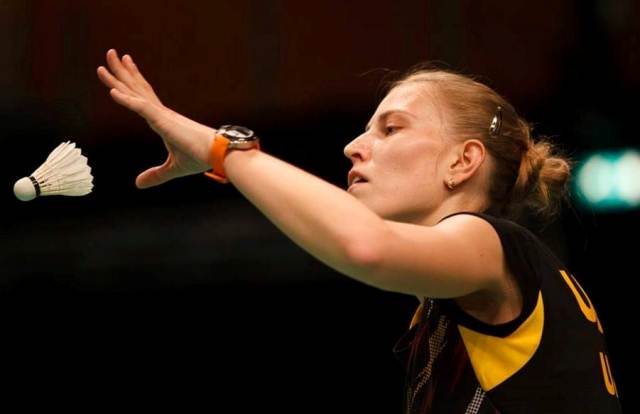

Personal information
- Full name: Mariia Viktorivna Ulitina
- Born: 5 November 1991 (age 35) Dnipropetrovsk, Ukrainian SSR
- Height: 1.78 m (5 ft 10 in)
- Weight: 65 kg (143 lb)

Sport
- Country: Ukraine
- Sport: Badminton
- Handedness: Right
- Coached by: Victoria Semenyuta

Women's singles & doubles
- Highest ranking: 47 (WS 29 September 2016); 42 (WD with Natalya Voytsekh 11 August 2011); 97 (XD with Kyrylo Leonov 20 March 2014)
- BWF profile

Mariia Viktorivna Ulitina (Ukrainian: Марія Вікторівна Улітіна; also transliterated as Mariya or Marija, born 5 November 1991) is a badminton player from Ukraine and the National Champion of Ukraine. She represented Ukraine in the 2016 Summer Olympics and proceeded to the knockout round after defeating the former world number one Saina Nehwal of India and Lohaynny Vicente of Brazil in the group stage.

== Achievements ==
=== BWF International Challenge/Series (5 titles, 11 runners-up) ===
Women's singles
Year	Tournament	Opponent	Score	Result
2010	Kharkiv International	(Ukraine) Larisa Griga	14–21, 21–17, 13–21	(silver) Runner-up
2010	Slovak Open	(Ukraine) Natalya Voytsekh	21–8, 21–13	(gold) Winner
2012	Hungarian International	(Russia) Olga Golovanova	21–11, 17–21, 21–16	(gold) Winner
2013	Slovenian International	(Denmark) Lene Clausen	21–11, 21–12	(gold) Winner
2014	Estonian International	(Russia) Evgeniya Kosetskaya	16–21, 21–23	(silver) Runner-up
2014	Czech International	(Canada) Michelle Li	14–21, 17–21	(silver) Runner-up
2015	Polish Open	(Germany) Karin Schnaase	19–21, 15–21	(silver) Runner-up
2015	Slovenian International	(Denmark) Mia Blichfeldt	17–21, 21–17, 21–12	(gold) Winner
2015	Bulgarian International	(Germany) Olga Konon	21–19, 16–21, 14–21	(silver) Runner-up
2016	Estonian International	(Belgium) Lianne Tan	19–21, 14–21	(silver) Runner-up

Women's doubles
Year	Tournament	Partner	Opponent	Score	Result
2009	Slovak Open	(Ukraine) Natalya Voytsekh	(Denmark) Maria Lykke Andersen (Denmark) Karina Sørensen	17–21, 10–21	(silver) Runner-up
2010	Kharkiv International	(Ukraine) Natalya Voytsekh	(Ukraine) Anna Kobceva (Ukraine) Elena Prus	23–21, 21–12	(gold) Winner
2010	Slovak Open	(Ukraine) Natalya Voytsekh	(Netherlands) Selena Piek (Netherlands) Iris Tabeling	10–21, 18–21	(silver) Runner-up
2011	Estonian International	(Ukraine) Natalya Voytsekh	(Netherlands) Selena Piek (Netherlands) Iris Tabeling	12–21, 16–21	(silver) Runner-up
2011	Lithuanian International	(Ukraine) Natalya Voytsekh	(Ukraine) Anna Kobceva (Ukraine) Elena Prus	12–21, 19–21	(silver) Runner-up
2017	Kharkiv International	(Ukraine) Natalya Voytsekh	(Germany) Johanna Goliszewski (Germany) Lara Käpplein	15–21, 14–21	(silver) Runner-up

BWF International Challenge tournament
BWF International Series tournament
BWF Future Series tournament

== See also ==
- Ukrainian National Badminton Championships
