= Russia national badminton team =

National badminton team representing Russia

Russia
- Association: National Badminton Federation of Russia (NBFR)
- Confederation: BE (Europe)
- President: Sergey Shakhray

BWF ranking
- Current ranking: Unranked (2 January 2024)
- Highest ranking: 9 (4 October 2012)

Sudirman Cup
- Appearances: 15 (first in 1993)
- Best result: Group stage

Thomas Cup
- Appearances: 3 (first in 2012)
- Best result: Quarter-finals (2012)

Uber Cup
- Appearances: 3 (first in 2010)
- Best result: Quarter-finals (2010)

European Mixed Team Championships
- Appearances: 15 (first in 1994)
- Best result: Runners-up (2017)

European Men's Team Championships
- Appearances: 9 (first in 2004)
- Best result: Semi-finals (2020)

European Women's Team Championships
- Appearances: 8 (first in 2008)
- Best result: Runners-up (2010, 2014)

The Russia national badminton team (Russian: Сборная России по бадминтону) represents Russia in international badminton competitions. The team is organized by the National Badminton Federation of Russia (NBFR) located in Moscow. The NBFR became the sport's sole administrator when the Russian Badminton Federation (RBF) was dissolved by the Russian Olympic Committee (ROC) in 2005.

In light of the 2022 Russian invasion of Ukraine, Badminton World Federation (BWF) banned Russian athletes and officials from tournaments. It also cancelled all BWF-sanctioned events in Russia, and banned all Russian national flags and symbols from being displayed at any BWF-sanctioned event.

On August 29, 2023, BWF announced that Russian athletes will be allowed to compete as neutrals starting February 26, 2024.

== Competitive record ==
=== Thomas Cup ===
Year	Result
(England) 1949	Part of the Soviet Union
(Colony of Singapore) 1952	Part of the Soviet Union
(Colony of Singapore) 1955	Part of the Soviet Union
(Colony of Singapore) 1958	Part of the Soviet Union
(Indonesia) 1961	Part of the Soviet Union
(Japan) 1964	Part of the Soviet Union
(Indonesia) 1967	Part of the Soviet Union
(Malaysia) 1970	Part of the Soviet Union
(Indonesia) 1973	Part of the Soviet Union
(Thailand) 1976	Part of the Soviet Union
(Indonesia) 1979	Part of the Soviet Union
(England) 1982	Part of the Soviet Union
(Malaysia) 1984	Part of the Soviet Union
(Indonesia) 1986	Part of the Soviet Union
(Malaysia) 1988	Part of the Soviet Union
(Japan) 1990	Part of the Soviet Union
(Malaysia) 1992	Part of the CIS
(Indonesia) 1994	Did not qualify
(Hong Kong) 1996	Did not qualify
(Hong Kong) 1998	Did not qualify
(Malaysia) 2000	Did not qualify
(China) 2002	Did not qualify
(Indonesia) 2004	Did not qualify
(Japan) 2006	Did not qualify
(Indonesia) 2008	Did not qualify
(Malaysia) 2010	Did not qualify
(China) 2012	Quarter-finals
(India) 2014	Group stage
(China) 2016	Did not qualify
(Thailand) 2018	Group stage
(Denmark) 2020	Withdrew
(Thailand) 2022	Banned
(China) 2024	Banned
(Denmark) 2026	Banned
(Indonesia) 2028	TBD
(N/A) 2030	TBD

=== Uber Cup ===
Year	Result
(England) 1957	Part of the Soviet Union
(United States) 1960	Part of the Soviet Union
(United States) 1963	Part of the Soviet Union
(New Zealand) 1966	Part of the Soviet Union
(Japan) 1969	Part of the Soviet Union
(Japan) 1972	Part of the Soviet Union
(Indonesia) 1975	Part of the Soviet Union
(New Zealand) 1978	Part of the Soviet Union
(Japan) 1981	Part of the Soviet Union
(Malaysia) 1984	Part of the Soviet Union
(Indonesia) 1986	Part of the Soviet Union
(Malaysia) 1988	Part of the Soviet Union
(Japan) 1990	Part of the Soviet Union
(Malaysia) 1992	Part of the CIS
(Indonesia) 1994	Did not qualify
(Hong Kong) 1996	Did not qualify
(Hong Kong) 1998	Did not qualify
(Malaysia) 2000	Did not qualify
(China) 2002	Did not qualify
(Indonesia) 2004	Did not qualify
(Japan) 2006	Did not qualify
(Indonesia) 2008	Did not qualify
(Malaysia) 2010	Quarter-finals
(China) 2012	Did not qualify
(India) 2014	Group stage
(China) 2016	Did not qualify
(Thailand) 2018	Group stage
(Denmark) 2020	Withdrew
(Thailand) 2022	Banned
(China) 2024	Banned
(Denmark) 2026	Banned
(Indonesia) 2028	TBD
(N/A) 2030	TBD

=== Sudirman Cup ===
Year	Result
(Indonesia) 1989	Part of the Soviet Union
(Denmark) 1991	Part of the Soviet Union
(England) 1993	Group 3 Promoted− 11th
(Switzerland) 1995	Group 2 − 9th
(Scotland) 1997	Group 2 − 11th
(Denmark) 1999	Group 2 Relegated − 14th
(Spain) 2001	Group 3 − 18th
(Netherlands) 2003	Group 3 Promoted− 15th
(China) 2005	Group 2 − 15th
(Scotland) 2007	Group 2 − 15th
(China) 2009	Group 2 − 10th
(China) 2011	Group 1 − 11th
(Malaysia) 2013	Group 2 Promoted− 13th
(China) 2015	Group 1 − 12th
(Australia) 2017	Group 1 − 11th
(China) 2019	Group 1 − 10th
(Finland) 2021	Group stage − 11th
(China) 2023	Banned
(China) 2025	Banned
(N/A) 2027	TBD
(N/A) 2029	TBD

=== European Team Championships ===
==== Men's team ====
Year	Result
(Slovakia) 2004	Quarter-finals
(Greece) 2006	Group stage
(Netherlands) 2008	Quarter-finals
(Poland) 2010	Quarter-finals
(Netherlands) 2012	Fourth place
(Switzerland) 2014	Quarter-finals
(Russia) 2016	Quarter-finals
(Russia) 2018	Quarter-finals
(France) 2020	(bronze) Semi-finals
(Poland) 2024	Banned
(Turkey) 2026	Banned

==== Women's team ====
Year	Result
(Slovakia) 2004	Quarter-finals
(Greece) 2006	Did not enter
(Netherlands) 2008	Quarter-finals
(Poland) 2010	(silver) Runners-up
(Netherlands) 2012	Fourth place
(Switzerland) 2014	(silver) Runners-up
(Russia) 2016	Quarter-finals
(Russia) 2018	(bronze) Semi-finals
(France) 2020	Quarter-finals
(Poland) 2024	Banned
(Turkey) 2026	Banned

==== Mixed team ====
Year	Result
(Sweden) 1972	Part of the Soviet Union
(Austria) 1974	Part of the Soviet Union
(Republic of Ireland) 1976	Part of the Soviet Union
(England) 1978	Part of the Soviet Union
(Netherlands) 1980	Part of the Soviet Union
(West Germany) 1982	Part of the Soviet Union
(England) 1984	Part of the Soviet Union
(Sweden) 1986	Part of the Soviet Union
(Norway) 1988	Part of the Soviet Union
(Soviet Union) 1990	Part of the Soviet Union
(Scotland) 1992	Part of the CIS
(Netherlands) 1994	Fourth place
(Denmark) 1996	Fourth place
(Bulgaria) 1998	Group stage − 7th
(Scotland) 2000	Group stage − 7th
(Sweden) 2002	Group stage − 7th
(Switzerland) 2004	Group stage − 6th
(Netherlands) 2006	Group stage − 8th
(Denmark) 2008	Group stage − 6th
(England) 2009	(bronze) Semi-finals
(Netherlands) 2011	(bronze) Semi-finals
(Russia) 2013	(bronze) Semi-finals
(Belgium) 2015	(bronze) Semi-finals
(Poland) 2017	(silver) Runners-up
(Denmark) 2019	(bronze) Semi-finals
(Finland) 2021	(bronze) Semi-finals
(France) 2023	Banned
(Azerbaijan) 2025	Banned

=== FISU World University Games ===
==== Mixed team ====
Year	Result
(Thailand) 2007	Group stage
(China) 2011	Group stage
(Russia) 2013	Round of 16
(South Korea) 2015	Group stage
(Chinese Taipei) 2017	Quarter-finals
(China) 2021	Banned
(Germany) 2025	TBD

=== World University Team Championships ===
==== Mixed team ====
Year	Result
(Portugal) 2008	Quarter-finals
(Chinese Taipei) 2010	Did not enter
(South Korea) 2012	Quarter-finals
(Spain) 2014	Group stage
(Russia) 2016	(bronze) Semi-finals
(Malaysia) 2018	Group stage

**Red border color indicates tournament was held on home soil.

== Junior competitive record ==
=== Suhandinata Cup ===
Year	Result
(China) 2000	Group stage − 10th of 24
(South Africa) 2002	Group stage − 14th of 23
(Canada) 2004	Group X1 − 10th of 20
(South Korea) 2006	Group Z2 − 12th of 28
(New Zealand) 2007	Group Z1 − 17th of 25
(India) 2008	Group Y − 14th of 21
(Malaysia) 2009	Group W − 11th of 21
(Mexico) 2010	Did not enter
(Chinese Taipei) 2011	Group Y1 − 10th of 22
(Japan) 2012	Group X2 − 16th of 30
(Thailand) 2013	Group W2 − 13th of 30
(Malaysia) 2014	Group W2 − 14th of 33
(Peru) 2015	Did not enter
(Spain) 2016	Group B2 − 21st of 52
(Indonesia) 2017	Group A2 − 14th of 44
(Canada) 2018	Did not enter
(Russia) 2019	Group B − 19th of 43
(Spain) 2022	Banned
(United States) 2023	Banned
(N/A) 2024	TBD

=== European Junior Team Championships ===
==== Mixed team ====
Year	Result
(Denmark) 1975	Part of the Soviet Union
(Malta) 1977	Part of the Soviet Union
(West Germany) 1979	Part of the Soviet Union
(Scotland) 1981	Part of the Soviet Union
(Finland) 1983	Part of the Soviet Union
(Austria) 1985	Part of the Soviet Union
(Poland) 1987	Part of the Soviet Union
(England) 1989	Part of the Soviet Union
(Hungary) 1991	Part of the Soviet Union
(Bulgaria) 1993	(bronze) Third place
(Slovakia) 1995	Did not enter
(Czech Republic) 1997	(silver) Runners-up
(Scotland) 1999	(silver) Runners-up
(Poland) 2001	(bronze) Third place
(Denmark) 2003	(bronze) Third place
(Netherlands) 2005	(silver) Runners-up
(Germany) 2007	Fourth place
(Italy) 2009	Quarter-finals
(Finland) 2011	(silver) Runners-up
(Turkey) 2013	Quarter-finals
(Poland) 2015	Quarter-finals
(France) 2017	(silver) Runners-up
(Estonia) 2018	(bronze) Semi-finalist
(Finland) 2020	(bronze) Semi-finalist
(Serbia) 2022	Banned

**Red border color indicates tournament was held on home soil.

== Players ==
=== Current squad ===
As of 2 January 2024

==== Men's team ====
Name	DoB/Age	Ranking of event		
Name	DoB/Age	MS	MD	XD
Sergey Sirant	12 April 1994 (age 32)	-	-	-
Georgii Karpov	17 July 2001 (age 24)	-	-	-
Artur Pechenkin	19 July 2002 (age 23)	-	-	-
Vladislav Dobychkin	1 August 2003 (age 22)	-	-	-
Vladimir Ivanov	3 July 1987 (age 38)	-	-	-
Ivan Sozonov	6 July 1989 (age 36)	-	-	-
Konstantin Abramov	16 May 1992 (age 33)	-	-	-
Alexandr Zinchenko	6 February 1995 (age 31)	-	-	-
Egor Borisov	18 June 2004 (age 21)	-	-	-
Rodion Alimov	21 April 1998 (age 28)	-	-	-

==== Women's team ====
Name	DoB/Age	Ranking of event		
Name	DoB/Age	WS	WD	XD
Evgeniya Kosetskaya	16 December 1994 (age 31)	-	-	-
Mariia Golubeva	26 May 2004 (age 21)	-	-	-
Alina Busygina	15 December 2000 (age 25)	-	-	-
Elena Komendrovskaja	19 May 1991 (age 34)	-	-	-
Ekaterina Malkova	12 December 1992 (age 33)	-	-	-
Anastasia Redkina	7 June 1998 (age 27)	-	-	-
Ksenia Evgenova	19 April 1996 (age 30)	-	-	-
Anastasiia Boiarun	6 October 2003 (age 22)	-	-	-
Alena Iakovleva	14 January 2003 (age 23)	-	-	-
Alina Davletova	17 July 1998 (age 27)	-	-	-

=== Previous squads ===
==== Sudirman Cup ====
- 2015, 2017, 2019, 2021

==== Thomas Cup ====
- 2012, 2014, 2018

==== Uber Cup ====
- 2010, 2012, 2014, 2018
