= 2017 Swiss Open Grand Prix Gold =

Tournament details
- Dates: 14–19 March 2017
- Level: Grand Prix Gold
- Total prize money: US$120,000
- Venue: St. Jakobshalle
- Location: Basel, Switzerland

Champions
- Men's singles: (China) Lin Dan
- Women's singles: (China) Chen Xiaoxin
- Men's doubles: (China) Chai Biao (China) Hong Wei
- Women's doubles: (China) Chen Qingchen (China) Jia Yifan
- Mixed doubles: (Thailand) Dechapol Puavaranukroh (Thailand) Sapsiree Taerattanachai

The 2017 Swiss Open Grand Prix Gold was the fifth Grand Prix's badminton tournament of the 2017 BWF Grand Prix Gold and Grand Prix. The tournament was held at the St. Jakobshalle in Basel, Switzerland on 14–19 March 2017 and had a total purse of $120,000.

== Men's singles ==
=== Seeds ===
1. (China) Lin Dan (champion)
2. (China) Shi Yuqi (final)
3. (India) Ajay Jayaram (withdrew)
4. (Indonesia) Jonatan Christie (withdrew)
5. (India) H. S. Prannoy (quarterfinals)
6. (Chinese Taipei) Wang Tzu-wei (semifinals)
7. (China) Huang Yuxiang (second round)
8. (Chinese Taipei) Hsu Jen-hao (second round)
9. (Denmark) Anders Antonsen (third round)
10. (China) Qiao Bin (third round)
11. (Malaysia) Zulfadli Zulkiffli (withdrew)
12. (Indonesia) Anthony Sinisuka Ginting (semifinals)
13. (India) Sameer Verma (second round)
14. (France) Brice Leverdez (third round)
15. (Indonesia) Ihsan Maulana Mustofa (quarterfinals)
16. (Denmark) Emil Holst (quarterfinals)

=== Finals ===
Quarterfinals
1	(China) Lin Dan	21	21
15	(Indonesia) Ihsan Maulana Mustofa	17	14
12	(Indonesia) Anthony Sinisuka Ginting	17	21	21
16	(Denmark) Emil Holst	21	15	13
6	(Chinese Taipei) Wang Tzu-wei	14	21	21
(Japan) Kanta Tsuneyama	21	16	17
5	(India) H. S. Prannoy	19	11
2	(China) Shi Yuqi	21	21

Semifinals
1	(China) Lin Dan	21	21
12	(Indonesia) Anthony Sinisuka Ginting	17	17
6	(Chinese Taipei) Wang Tzu-wei	21	17	15
2	(China) Shi Yuqi	18	21	21

Final
1	(China) Lin Dan	21	21
2	(China) Shi Yuqi	12	11

=== Top half ===
==== Section 1 ====
First round
1	(China) Lin D	21	21
(France) A Merklé	14	5
(Japan) K Watanabe	21	16	22
(Czech Republic) M Ludík	12	21	20
14	(France) B Leverdez	21	21
(Denmark) K Bruun	12	19
(Norway) M Myhre	10	8
(Finland) K Lehikoinen	21	21

Second round
1	(China) Lin D	21	21
(Japan) K Watanabe	13	13
14	(France) B Leverdez	21	21
(Finland) K Lehikoinen	19	11

Third round
1	(China) Lin D	21	21
14	(France) B Leverdez	7	14

==== Section 2 ====
First round
8	(Chinese Taipei) Hsu J-h	21	21
(Poland) M Dubowski	16	8
(Indonesia) K H Wibowo	10	18
(Germany) F Roth	21	21
15	(Indonesia) I M Mustofa	21	21
(Japan) Y Onodera	14	18
(Russia) D Grachev	17	21	21
(Switzerland) M Bonny	21	17	18

Second round
8	(Chinese Taipei) Hsu J-h	23	19	14
(Germany) F Roth	21	21	21
15	(Indonesia) I M Mustofa	21	21
(Russia) D Grachev	9	13

Third round
(Germany) F Roth	16	9
15	(Indonesia) I M Mustofa	21	21

==== Section 3 ====
First round
PFR	(Germany) S Wang	21	15	12
(Finland) I Heino	8	21	21
(United States) B Seguin	16	21	18
(Japan) R Takeshita	21	10	21
12	(Indonesia) A S Ginting	21	21
(Republic of Ireland) J Magee	15	11
(Germany) L Schaenzler	22	26
(Malaysia) Goh G C	24	28

Second round
(Finland) I Heino	21	17	18
(Japan) R Takeshita	17	21	21
12	(Indonesia) A S Ginting	21	21
(Malaysia) Goh G C	11	11

Third round
(Japan) R Takeshita	7	16
12	(Indonesia) A S Ginting	21	21

==== Section 4 ====
First round
7	(China) Huang YX	12	21	21
(Finland) E Heino	21	13	15
(Netherlands) M Caljouw	21	21
(France) T Rouxel	12	17
16	(Denmark) E Holst	17	21	23
(Netherlands) E Meijs	21	17	21
(England) S Parsons	21	21
(Finland) H Aarnio	17	11

Second round
7	(China) Huang YX	17	16
(Netherlands) M Caljouw	21	21
16	(Denmark) E Holst	21	21
(England) S Parsons	17	18

Third round
(Netherlands) M Caljouw	16	15
16	(Denmark) E Holst	21	21

=== Bottom half ===
==== Section 5 ====
First round
(Netherlands) N Fransman	9	12
(Chinese Taipei) Lin Y-h	21	21
(France) L Corvee	24	21
PFR	(Switzerland) C Kirchmayr	22	18
(Japan) H Shimono	22	23	21
(France) L Claerbout	24	21	23
(Sri Lanka) N Karunaratne	6	6
6	(Chinese Taipei) Wang T-w	21	21

Second round
(Chinese Taipei) Lin Y-h	21	21
(France) L Corvee	19	19
(France) L Claerbout	21	12	16
6	(Chinese Taipei) Wang T-w	13	21	21

Third round
(Chinese Taipei) Lin Y-h	14	12
6	(Chinese Taipei) Wang T-w	21	21

==== Section 6 ====
First round
(Japan) K Tsuneyama	21	21
PFR	(India) L Sarang	11	5
(Hungary) G Krausz	10	16
13	(India) S Verma	21	21
PFR	(Slovenia) I Utrosa	21	21
(Indonesia) N E Sulistyo	10	15
(India) S Dey	17	21	21
PFR	(Germany) A Roovers	21	17	15

Second round
(Japan) K Tsuneyama	16	21	21
13	(India) S Verma	21	15	13
PFR	(Slovenia) I Utrosa	17	18
(India) S Dey	21	21

Third round
(Japan) K Tsuneyama	21	21
(India) S Dey	19	14

==== Section 7 ====
First round
(India) S Verma	21	21	12
(Denmark) R Gemke	14	23	21
(Denmark) C L Thomsen	19	21	12
10	(China) Qiao B	21	19	21
(Scotland) K Merrilees	21	21
PFR	(England) M Spencer-Smith	3	7
PFR	(Germany) D Peng	15	18
5	(India) H. S. Prannoy	21	21

Second round
(Denmark) R Gemke	9	13
10	(China) Qiao B	21	21
(Scotland) K Merrilees	17	19
5	(India) H. S. Prannoy	21	21

Third round
10	(China) Qiao B	21	21	15
5	(India) H. S. Prannoy	9	23	21

==== Section 8 ====
First round
(England) T Penty	21	21
(Slovenia) A Roj	12	13
(Finland) K Koljonen	21	20	9
9	(Denmark) A Antonsen	16	22	21
(Poland) M Rogalski	16	19
(Republic of Ireland) S Evans	21	21
(Czech Republic) J Frohlich	11	13
2	(China) Shi YQ	21	21

Second round
(England) T Penty	12	21	10
9	(Denmark) A Antonsen	21	13	21
(Republic of Ireland) S Evans	17	13
2	(China) Shi YQ	21	21

Third round
9	(Denmark) A Antonsen	21	15	16
2	(China) Shi YQ	16	21	21

== Women's singles ==
=== Seeds ===
1. (India) Saina Nehwal (withdrew)
2. (United States) Zhang Beiwen (second round)
3. (China) Chen Yufei (final)
4. (Singapore) Liang Xiaoyu (withdrew)
5. (Chinese Taipei) Hsu Ya-ching (first round)
6. (Bulgaria) Linda Zetchiri (quarterfinals)
7. (Indonesia) Fitriani (semifinals)
8. (Chinese Taipei) Chiang Mei-hui (second round)

=== Finals ===
Semifinals
PFQ	(Japan) Chisato Hoshi	13	17
3	(China) Chen Yufei	21	21
(China) Chen Xiaoxin	21	21
7	(Indonesia) Fitriani	17	19

Final
3	(China) Chen Yufei	19	14
(China) Chen Xiaoxin	21	21

=== Top half ===
==== Section 1 ====
First round
PFQ	(Japan) C Hoshi	21	21
(Finland) N Vainio	7	6
(Netherlands) G Mahulette	18	13
(Chinese Taipei) Lee C-h	21	21
6	(Bulgaria) L Zetchiri	21	19	21
Q1	(Indonesia) P Siahaya	16	21	19
(Germany) F Deprez	21	7	16
(Russia) N Perminova	19	21	21

Second round
PFQ	(Japan) C Hoshi	21	21
(Chinese Taipei) Lee C-h	13	19
6	(Bulgaria) L Zetchiri	21	21
(Russia) N Perminova	14	19

Quarterfinals
PFQ	(Japan) C Hoshi	21	21
6	(Bulgaria) L Zetchiri	14	12

==== Section 2 ====
First round
3	(China) Chen YF	22	21
(Ukraine) M Ulitina	20	5
PFQ	(Estonia) G Saar	15	7
(Switzerland) S Jaquet	21	21
5	(Chinese Taipei) Hsu Y-c	21	9	19
(Indonesia) D D Ayustine	14	21	21
Q4	(Japan) S Takahashi	21	21
(Scotland) K Gilmour	7	10

Second round
3	(China) Chen YF	21	21
(Switzerland) S Jaquet	16	16
(Indonesia) D D Ayustine	16	10
Q4	(Japan) S Takahashi	21	21

Quarterfinals
3	(China) Chen YF	21	21
Q4	(Japan) S Takahashi	19	12

=== Bottom half ===
==== Section 3 ====
First round
Q3	(Hungary) Á Kőrösi	20	19
(Germany) O Konon	22	21
(Russia) K Polikarpova	20	9
8	(Chinese Taipei) Chiang M-h	22	21
(Germany) L Heim	21	21
Q2	(Malaysia) Yap R C	19	15
(China) Chen XX	21	21
PFQ	(Ukraine) N Voytsekh	10	6

Second round
(Germany) O Konon	22	21
8	(Chinese Taipei) Chiang M-h	20	18
(Germany) L Heim	9	18
(China) Chen XX	21	21

Quarterfinals
(Germany) O Konon	8	9
(China) Chen XX	21	21

==== Section 4 ====
First round
(France) D Lansac	19	10
PFQ	(China) Zhang YM	21	21
(India) S K P Kudaravalli	18	8
7	(Indonesia) Fitriani	21	21
(England) F M Chapman	20	15
(Denmark) M Blichfeldt	22	21
(Bulgaria) M Mitsova	10	15
2	(United States) Zhang BW	21	21

Second round
PFQ	(China) Zhang YM	9	21	18
7	(Indonesia) Fitriani	21	12	21
(Denmark) M Blichfeldt	21	21
2	(United States) Zhang BW	18	12

Quarterfinals
7	(Indonesia) Fitriani	12	21	22
(Denmark) M Blichfeldt	21	19	20

== Men's doubles ==
=== Seeds ===
1. (China) Chai Biao / Hong Wei (champion)
2. (China) Li Junhui / Liu Yuchen (second round)
3. (Denmark) Kim Astrup / Anders Skaarup Rasmussen (quarterfinals)
4. (England) Marcus Ellis / Chris Langridge (semifinals)
5. (Chinese Taipei) Chen Hung-ling / Wang Chi-lin (semifinals)
6. (Denmark) Mathias Christiansen / David Daugaard (quarterfinals)
7. (Chinese Taipei) Lu Ching-yao / Yang Po-han (second round)
8. (Indonesia) Fajar Alfian / Muhammad Rian Ardianto (quarterfinals)

=== Finals ===
Semifinals

Final

1
- (China) Chai Biao
- (China) Hong Wei
17
21
21

5
- (Chinese Taipei) Chen Hung-ling
- (Chinese Taipei) Wang Chi-lin
21
15
18

1
- (China) Chai Biao
- (China) Hong Wei
13
21
21

- (China) Liu Cheng
- (China) Zhang Nan
21
16
15

4
- (England) Marcus Ellis
- (England) Chris Langridge
9
19

- (China) Liu Cheng
- (China) Zhang Nan
21
21

=== Top half ===
==== Section 1 ====
First round

Second round

Quarterfinals

1
- (China) Chai B
- (China) Hong W
21
21

- (India) M Attri
- (India) B. S Reddy
15
19

1
- (China) Chai B
- (China) Hong W
22
21

- (Singapore) Terry Hee Y K
- (Singapore) Loh K H
20
12

- (Germany) J R Jansen
- (Germany) J Zurwonne
20
19

- (Singapore) Terry Hee Y K
- (Singapore) Loh K H
22
21

1
- (China) Chai B
- (China) Hong W
21
22

8
- (Indonesia) F Alfian
15
20

8
- (Indonesia) F Alfian
21
21

- (Thailand) K Kedren
16
14

8
- (Indonesia) F Alfian
21
21

- (Russia) K Abramov
- (Russia) A Zinchenko
15
18

- (England) P Briggs
- (England) T Wolfenden
15
21
15

- (Russia) K Abramov
- (Russia) A Zinchenko
21
13
21

==== Section 2 ====
First round

Second round

Quarterfinals

3
- (Denmark) K Astrup
21
15
21

Q1
- (Indonesia) H Setiawan
- (Malaysia) Tan B H
13
21
14

3
- (Denmark) K Astrup
21
21

- (Germany) R Beck
- (Germany) P Kaesbauer
12
15

- (Denmark) F Colberg
- (Denmark) R Fladberg
16
12

- (Germany) R Beck
- (Germany) P Kaesbauer
21
21

3
- (Denmark) K Astrup
22
10

5
- (Chinese Taipei) Chen H-l
- (Chinese Taipei) Wang C-l
24
21

5
- (Chinese Taipei) Chen H-l
- (Chinese Taipei) Wang C-l
21
21

- (Scotland) M Campbell
- (Scotland) P Machugh
10
11

5
- (Chinese Taipei) Chen H-l
- (Chinese Taipei) Wang C-l
21
21

- (Japan) T Inoue
- (Japan) Y Kaneko
11
8

- (Sweden) R Eidestedt
- (Sweden) N Ruponen

- (Japan) T Inoue
- (Japan) Y Kaneko
w
/
o

=== Bottom half ===
==== Section 3 ====
First round

Second round

Quarterfinals

- (Chinese Taipei) Liao K-h
- (Chinese Taipei) Lu C-p
21
23
21

- (Belgium) M Dierickx
- (Belgium) F Golinski
17
25
14

- (Chinese Taipei) Liao K-h
- (Chinese Taipei) Lu C-p
12
19

6
- (Denmark) M Christiansen
- (Denmark) D Daugaard
21
21

Q4
- (Malaysia) A L Mohd Razif
- (Malaysia) H Muhammad Hafiz
8
9

6
- (Denmark) M Christiansen
- (Denmark) D Daugaard
21
21

6
- (Denmark) M Christiansen
- (Denmark) D Daugaard
20
21
19

4
- (England) M Ellis
- (England) C Langridge
22
17
21

- (Singapore) D B Chrisnanta
- (Singapore) H Wijaya
22
21

PFQ
- (France) B Kersaudy
- (France) J Maio
20
15

- (Singapore) D B Chrisnanta
- (Singapore) H Wijaya
17
10

4
- (England) M Ellis
- (England) C Langridge
21
21

- (Republic of Ireland) J Magee
- (Republic of Ireland) S Magee
10
14

4
- (England) M Ellis
- (England) C Langridge
21
21

==== Section 4 ====
First round

Second round

Quarterfinals

Q2
- (Poland) M Bochat
- (Poland) A Cwalina
21
21

- (Netherlands) J Maas
- (Netherlands) R Tabeling
14
17

Q2
- (Poland) M Bochat
- (Poland) A Cwalina
20
21
21

7
- (Chinese Taipei) Lu C-y
- (Chinese Taipei) Yang P-h
22
19
17

Q3
- (Japan) K Gondo
- (Japan) T Watanabe
25
16
21

7
- (Chinese Taipei) Lu C-y
- (Chinese Taipei) Yang P-h
23
21
23

Q2
- (Poland) M Bochat
- (Poland) A Cwalina
15
15

- (China) Liu C
- (China) Zhang N
21
21

- (China) Liu C
- (China) Zhang N
21
21

- (Russia) E Dremin
- (Russia) D Grachev
9
10

- (China) Liu C
- (China) Zhang N
17
21
21

2
- (China) Li JH
- (China) Liu YC
21
12
19

- (Malaysia) Ong Y S
- (Malaysia) Teo E Y
26
18

2
- (China) Li JH
- (China) Liu YC
28
21

== Women's doubles ==
=== Seeds ===
1. (China) Chen Qingchen / Jia Yifan (champion)
2. (Thailand) Puttita Supajirakul / Sapsiree Taerattanachai (quarterfinals)
3. (Malaysia) Vivian Hoo Kah Mun / Woon Khe Wei (quarterfinals)
4. (Bulgaria) Gabriela Stoeva / Stefani Stoeva (final)
5. (Indonesia) Della Destiara Haris / Rosyita Eka Putri Sari (quarterfinals)
6. (Indonesia) Greysia Polii / Rizki Amelia Pradipta (second round)
7. (Denmark) Maiken Fruergaard / Sara Thygesen (semifinals)
8. (Indonesia) Ni Ketut Mahadewi Istirani / Tiara Rosalia Nuraidah (first round)

=== Finals ===
Semifinals

Final

1
- (China) Chen Qingchen
- (China) Jia Yifan
21
21

7
- (Denmark) Maiken Fruergaard
- (Denmark) Sara Thygesen
12
14

1
- (China) Chen Qingchen
- (China) Jia Yifan
21
21

4
- (Bulgaria) Gabriela Stoeva
- (Bulgaria) Stefani Stoeva
16
15

4
- (Bulgaria) Gabriela Stoeva
- (Bulgaria) Stefani Stoeva
22
21

- (China) Bao Yixin
- (China) Yu Xiaohan
20
19

=== Top half ===
==== Section 1 ====
First round

Second round

Quarterfinals

1
- (China) Chen QC
- (China) Jia YF
21
21

- (Russia) A Chervyakova
- (Russia) O Morozova
10
12

1
- (China) Chen QC
- (China) Jia YF
21
21

- (Germany) J Goliszewski
- (Germany) L Käpplein
12
17

- (India) S Santosh
- (India) A S Sunil
15
15

- (Germany) J Goliszewski
- (Germany) L Käpplein
21
21

1
- (China) Chen QC
- (China) Jia YF
17
21
21

5
- (Indonesia) D D Haris
21
10
14

5
- (Indonesia) D D Haris
21
21

- (France) L Baumann
- (France) A Fontaine
10
9

5
- (Indonesia) D D Haris
21
21

- (England) L Smith
- (England) S Walker
12
14

PFQ
- (Finland) J Nyström
- (Finland) S Pekkola
16
13

- (England) L Smith
- (England) S Walker
21
21

==== Section 2 ====
First round

Second round

Quarterfinals

3
- (Malaysia) Vivian Hoo
21
21

- (Chinese Taipei) Lin X-m
- (Chinese Taipei) Wu F-c
18
14

3
- (Malaysia) Vivian Hoo
21
21

- (Chinese Taipei) Chiang K-h
- (Chinese Taipei) Hung S-h
7
12

Q4
- (Indonesia) K Imma Muthiah
16
17

- (Chinese Taipei) Chiang K-h
- (Chinese Taipei) Hung S-h
21
21

3
- (Malaysia) Vivian Hoo
18
21
15

7
- (Denmark) M Fruergaard
- (Denmark) S Thygesen
21
8
21

7
- (Denmark) M Fruergaard
- (Denmark) S Thygesen
21
21

- (Bulgaria) M Mitsova
- (Bulgaria) P Nedelcheva
19
17

7
- (Denmark) M Fruergaard
- (Denmark) S Thygesen
15
21
24

- (Japan) C Hoshi
- (Japan) N Shinoya
21
19
22

Q3
- (Germany) B Bellenberg
- (Germany) F Volkmann
6
9

- (Japan) C Hoshi
- (Japan) N Shinoya
21
21

=== Bottom half ===
==== Section 3 ====
First round

Second round

Quarterfinals

- (France) E Lefel
- (France) A Tran
13
10

PFQ
- (Germany) I Herttrich
- (Germany) O Konon
21
21

PFQ
- (Germany) I Herttrich
- (Germany) O Konon
21
19
22

6
- (Indonesia) G Polii
- (Indonesia) R A Pradipta
18
21
20

PFQ
- (Germany) A Horbach
- (Germany) T Wurm
7
8

6
- (Indonesia) G Polii
- (Indonesia) R A Pradipta
21
21

PFQ
- (Germany) I Herttrich
- (Germany) O Konon
19
6

4
- (Bulgaria) G Stoeva
- (Bulgaria) S Stoeva
21
21

- (Netherlands) C Seinen
- (Netherlands) I Tabeling
21
21

- (Sweden) C Nistad
- (Sweden) E Wengberg
19
11

- (Netherlands) C Seinen
- (Netherlands) I Tabeling
11
7

4
- (Bulgaria) G Stoeva
- (Bulgaria) S Stoeva
21
21

- (Switzerland) N Fankhauser
- (Malaysia) S Saniru
10
9

4
- (Bulgaria) G Stoeva
- (Bulgaria) S Stoeva
21
21

==== Section 4 ====
First round

Second round

Quarterfinals

- (Chinese Taipei) Hsu Y-c
- (Chinese Taipei) Wu T-j
21
21

PFQ
- (Germany) L Efler
- (Germany) E Janssens
14
17

- (Chinese Taipei) Hsu Y-c
- (Chinese Taipei) Wu T-j
12
20

- (China) Bao YX
- (China) Yu XH
21
22

- (China) Bao YX
- (China) Yu XH
20
21
21

8
- (Indonesia) N K M Istirani
22
17
12

- (China) Bao YX
- (China) Yu XH
21
21

2
- (Thailand) P Supajirakul
14
13

- (Switzerland) C Burkart
- (Switzerland) C Hantz
13
16

- (Indonesia) A S Awanda
- (Indonesia) A Rahayu
21
21

- (Indonesia) A S Awanda
- (Indonesia) A Rahayu
17
10

2
- (Thailand) P Supajirakul
21
21

Q1
- (Switzerland) S Keller
- (Switzerland) Y Keller
10
3

2
- (Thailand) P Supajirakul
21
21

== Mixed doubles ==
=== Seeds ===
1. (China) Zheng Siwei / Chen Qingchen (semifinals)
2. (Indonesia) Praveen Jordan / Debby Susanto (final)
3. (Thailand) Dechapol Puavaranukroh / Sapsiree Taerattanachai (champion)
4. (India) Pranaav Jerry Chopra / N. Sikki Reddy (quarterfinals)
5. (China) Zhang Nan / Li Yinhui (semifinals)
6. (Singapore) Terry Hee Yong Kai / Tan Wei Han (quarterfinals)
7. (Denmark) Mathias Christiansen / Sara Thygesen (quarterfinals)
8. (Indonesia) Ronald Alexander / Melati Daeva Oktavianti (first round)

=== Finals ===
Semifinals

Final

1
- (China) Zheng Siwei
- (China) Chen Qingchen
19
21
19

3
- (Thailand) Dechapol Puavaranukroh
21
13
21

3
- (Thailand) Dechapol Puavaranukroh
21
21

2
- (Indonesia) Praveen Jordan
- (Indonesia) Debby Susanto
18
15

5
- (China) Zhang Nan
- (China) Li Yinhui
21
19
16

2
- (Indonesia) Praveen Jordan
- (Indonesia) Debby Susanto
17
21
21

=== Top half ===
==== Section 1 ====
First round

Second round

Quarterfinals

1
- (China) Zheng SW
- (China) Chen QC
21
21

- (Indonesia) A E Prasetya
14
19

1
- (China) Zheng SW
- (China) Chen QC
22
21

Q1
- (Indonesia) T Ahmad
- (Indonesia) G E Widjaja
20
13

Q4
- (Netherlands) R Jille
- (Netherlands) I Tabeling
17
14

Q1
- (Indonesia) T Ahmad
- (Indonesia) G E Widjaja
21
21

1
- (China) Zheng SW
- (China) Chen QC
21
21

7
- (Denmark) M Christiansen
- (Denmark) S Thygesen
13
19

7
- (Denmark) M Christiansen
- (Denmark) S Thygesen
21
21

- (Czech Republic) J Bitman
- (Czech Republic) A Basova
15
11

7
- (Denmark) M Christiansen
- (Denmark) S Thygesen
21
21

- (France) B Kersaudy
- (France) L Palermo
15
17

- (India) R Kapoor
- (India) S Santosh
16
19

- (France) B Kersaudy
- (France) L Palermo
21
21

==== Section 2 ====
First round

Second round

Quarterfinals

3
- (Thailand) D Puavaranukroh
24
21
21

- (Russia) A Zinchenko
- (Russia) O Morozova
26
8
8

3
- (Thailand) D Puavaranukroh
21
21

Q2
- (England) M Ellis
- (England) L Smith
12
16

- (Poland) P Pietryja
- (Poland) A Wojtkowska
21
16
15

Q2
- (England) M Ellis
- (England) L Smith
17
21
21

3
- (Thailand) D Puavaranukroh
21
21

- (Germany) M Lamsfuss
- (Germany) I Herttrich
14
17

8
- (Indonesia) R Alexander
22
21
15

- (Germany) M Lamsfuss
- (Germany) I Herttrich
24
16
21

- (Germany) M Lamsfuss
- (Germany) I Herttrich
7
21
21

- (Netherlands) R Tabeling
- (Netherlands) C Seinen
21
17
18

- (Chinese Taipei) Lin C-y
- (Chinese Taipei) Wu T-j
14
21
12

- (Netherlands) R Tabeling
- (Netherlands) C Seinen
21
19
21

=== Bottom half ===
==== Section 3 ====
First round

Second round

Quarterfinals

- (Republic of Ireland) S Magee
- (Republic of Ireland) C Magee
22
19
21

- (Chinese Taipei) Lu C-y
- (Chinese Taipei) Chiang K-h
20
21
16

- (Republic of Ireland) S Magee
- (Republic of Ireland) C Magee
20
18

5
- (China) Zhang N
- (China) Li YH
22
21

- (Switzerland) O Schaller
- (Switzerland) C Burkart
15
13

5
- (China) Zhang N
- (China) Li YH
21
21

5
- (China) Zhang N
- (China) Li YH
21
21

4
- (India) P J Chopra
- (India) N. S Reddy
19
17

- (Chinese Taipei) Chang K-c
- (Chinese Taipei) Chang H-t
21
21

PFQ
- (France) J Corvee
- (France) A Tran
17
11

- (Chinese Taipei) Chang K-c
- (Chinese Taipei) Chang H-t
24
10

4
- (India) P J Chopra
- (India) N. S Reddy
26
21

- (Sweden) N Ruponen
- (Sweden) A Hogstrom

4
- (India) P J Chopra
- (India) N. S Reddy
w
/
o

==== Section 4 ====
First round

Second round

Quarterfinals

Q3
- (Germany) J R Jansen
- (Germany) F Volkmann
19
12

- (Denmark) S Gravholt
- (Denmark) M Fruergaard
21
21

- (Denmark) S Gravholt
- (Denmark) M Fruergaard
13
21
22

6
- (Singapore) Terry Hee Y K
- (Singapore) Tan W H
21
17
24

- (France) R Labar
- (France) A Fontaine
15
20

6
- (Singapore) Terry Hee Y K
- (Singapore) Tan W H
21
22

6
- (Singapore) Terry Hee Y K
- (Singapore) Tan W H
19
22

2
- (Indonesia) P Jordan
- (Indonesia) D Susanto
21
24

- (Russia) E Dremin
- (Russia) E Dimova
21
21

- (Netherlands) J Maas
- (Netherlands) I Van Der Aar
19
18

- (Russia) E Dremin
- (Russia) E Dimova
13
10

2
- (Indonesia) P Jordan
- (Indonesia) D Susanto
21
21

- (Chinese Taipei) Wang C-l
- (Chinese Taipei) Lee C-h
11
21
17

2
- (Indonesia) P Jordan
- (Indonesia) D Susanto
21
17
21

Preceded by 2017 German Open Grand Prix Gold	BWF Grand Prix Gold and Grand Prix; 2017 BWF Season	Succeeded by 2017 China Masters Grand Prix Gold
