= Finnish National Badminton Championships =

Badminton tournament in Finland

The Finnish National Badminton Championships is a tournament organized to crown the best badminton players in Finland.

The tournament started in 1955.

== Past winners ==
Year	Men's singles	Women's singles	Men's doubles	Women's doubles	Mixed doubles
1955	Lars Palmen	Inger Gerkman	Lars Palmen; Harry Troupp	no competition	no competition
1956	Lars Palmen	Terttu Weckström	Lars Palmen; Harry Troupp	no competition	Lars Palmen; A. M. Palmen
1957	Lars Palmen	Terttu Weckström	Lars Palmen; Stig Wassenius	no competition	Lars Palmen; A. M. Palmen
1958	Kaj Lindfors	Terttu Weckström	Kaj Lindfors; Harry Saren	no competition	Kaj Lindfors; M. Frederiksen
1959	Kaj Lindfors	Maritta Petrell	Lars Palmen; Kaj Osterberg	no competition	Harry Saren; Myra Dammert
1960	Kaj Lindfors	Maritta Petrell	Lars Palmen; Kaj Osterberg	no competition	Kaj Lindfors; Ann-Louise von Essen
1961	Kaj Lindfors	Maritta Petrell	Kaj Lindfors; Harry Saren	Marita Petrel; Lisbeth Baumgartner	Kaj Lindfors; Ann-Louise von Essen
1962	Kaj Lindfors	Maritta Petrell	Kaj Lindfors; Kaj Osterberg	Marita Petrel; Lisbeth Baumgartner	Kaj Lindfors; Ann-Louise von Essen
1963	Bengt Soderberg	Maritta Petrell	Bengt Soderberg; Marten Segercrantz	Marita Petrel; Sanni Jaakkola	Marten Segercrantz; Lisbeth Baumgartner
1964	Bengt Soderberg	Maritta Petrell	Bengt Soderberg; Marten Segercrantz	Marita Petrel; Inger German	Marten Segercrantz; Ann-Louise von Essen
1965	Rainer Brander	Maritta Petrell	Bengt Soderberg; Marten Segercrantz	Marita Petrel; Terttu Weckström	Marten Segercrantz; Lisbeth Baumgartner
1966	Rainer Brander	Maritta Renqvist	Eero Loikko; Marten Segercrantz	Wiola Hostbacka; Ann Christine Tengstrom	Marten Segercrantz; Ann-Louise von Essen
1967	Marten Segercrantz	Wiola Hostbacka	Bengt Soderberg; Marten Segercrantz	Wiola Hostbacka; Ann Christine Tengstrom	Carl Johan Godenhjelm; Ann Christine Tengstrom
1968	Reiner Brander	Wiola Renholm	Bengt Soderberg; Marten Segercrantz	Wiola Renholm; Ann Christine Tengstrom	Eero Loikko; Wiola Renholm
1969	Marten Segercrantz	Wiola Renholm	Bengt Soderberg; Marten Segercrantz	Bodil Valtonen; Ann-Louise Wiklund	Eero Loikko; Wiola Renholm
1970	Eero Loikko	Sylvi Jormanainen	Dick Month‚n; Jouko Degerth	Bodil Valtonen; Sylvi Jormanainen	Marten Segercrantz; Sylvi Jormanainen
1971	Lars-Henrik Nybergh	Sylvi Jormanainen	Eero Loikko; Carl Johan Godenhjelm	Bodil Valtonen; Sylvi Jormanainen	Eero Loikko; Wiola Renholm
1972	Lars-Henrik Nybergh	Ann-Luisa Wiklund	Eero Loikko; Carl Johan Godenhjelm	Christine Dahlberg; Ann Christine Damstrom	Jouko Degerth; Christiane Dahlberg
1973	Jouko Degerth	Wiola Renholm	Lars-Henrik Nyberg; Carl-Johan Nyberg	Maarit Jaakkola; Sylvi Jormanainen	Eero Loikko; Wiola Renholm
1974	Lars-Henrik Nybergh	Sylvi Jormanainen	Eero Loikko; Marten Segercrantz	Maarit Jaakkola; Sylvi Jormanainen	Jouko Degerth; Christiane Falenius
1975	Lars-Henrik Nybergh	Sylvi Jormanainen	Jouko Degerth; Marten Segercrantz	Maarit Jaakkola; Sylvi Jormanainen	Jouko Degerth; Christiane Falenius
1976	Lars-Henrik Nybergh	Raija Koivisto	Lars-Henrik Nyberg; Carl-Johan Nyberg	Maarit Jaakkola; Sylvi Jormanainen	Jouko Degerth; Wiola Renholm
1977	Lars-Henrik Nybergh	Raija Koivisto	Lars-Henrik Nyberg; Carl-Johan Nyberg	Maarit Jaakkola; Sylvi Jormanainen	Lars-Henrik Nyberg; Gun Dasselstrom
1978	Lars-Henrik Nybergh	Raija Koivisto	Lars-Henrik Nyberg; Thomas Westerholm	Wiola Reinholm; Peggy Falcken	Jouko Degerth; Wiola Renholm
1979	Jouko Degerth	Wiola Reinholm	Jouko Degerth; Martti Suokari	Kristiina Tainio; Tiina Partio	Jouko Degerth; Kritiina Tainio
1980	Lars-Henrik Hybergh	Kristiina Tainio	Jouko Degerth; Ronald von Hertzen	Kristiina Tainio; Tiina Partio	Heikki Holvikari; Wiola Renholm
1981	Tony Tuominen	Sara Ussher	Lars-Henrik Nyberg; Thomas Westerholm	Kristiina Tainio; Tiina Partio	Peter Hammer; Jaana Ellilo
1982	Tony Tuominen	Jaana Ellilo	Jouko Degerth; Heikki Holvikarii	Tarja Knuuttila; Petra Knuuttila	Jouko Degerth; Wiola Renholm
1983	Heikki Holvikari	Jaana Ellilo	Tony Tuominen; Pekka Sarasjorvi	Peggy Hintze; Johanna Segercrantz	Tony Tuominen; Wiola Renholm
1984	Thomas Westerholm	Jaana Ellilo	Tony Tuominen; Pekka Sarasjorvi	Kristiina Tainio; Pirjo Terovoinen	Mika Heinonen; Susanna Dahlberg
1985	Heikki Holvikari	Pia Pajunen	Jouko Degerth; Thomas Westerholm	Pia Pajunen; Nina Sundberg	Lasse Lindelöf; Ulrica von Pfaler
1986	Tony Tuominen	Pia Pajunen	Tony Tuominen; Mika Heinonen	Christina von Pfaler; Kristiina Tainio	Lasse Lindelöf; Ulrica von Pfaler
1987	Pontus Jantti	Nina Sundberg	Pontus Jantti; Lasse Lindelöf	Ulrica von Pfaler; Kristiina Tainio	Lasse Lindelöf; Ulrica von Pfaler
1988	Pontus Jantti	Nina Sundberg	Tony Tuominen; Mika Heinonen	Ulrica von Pfaler; Kristiina Tainio-Pesonen	Mika Heinonen; Nina Sundberg
1989	Pontus Jantti	Kristiina Tainio-Pesonen	Tony Tuominen; Mika Heinonen	Ulrica von Pfaler; Kristiina Tainio-Pesonen	Mika Heinonen; Ulrica von Pfaler
1990	Pontus Jantti	Kristiina Tainio-Pesonen	Ronald von Hertzen; Robert Liljequist	Ulrica von Pfaler; Kristiina Tainio-Pesonen	Mika Heinonen; Pia Pajunen
1991	Pontus Jantti	Susanna Dahlberg	Tony Tuominen; Mika Heinonen	Christina von Pfaler; Ulrica von Pfaler	Mika Heinonen; Ulrica von Pfaler
1992	Pontus Jantti	Nina Sundberg	Robert Liljequist; Tony Tuominen	Christina von Pfaler; Nina Sundberg	Lasse Lindelöf; Ulrica von Pfaler
1993	Pontus Jantti	Nina Sundberg	Pekka Sarasjorvi; Tony Tuominen	Christina von Pfaler; Susanna Rauhanen	Pekka Sarasjarvi; Ulrica von Pfaler
1994	Robert Liljequist	Nina Sundberg	Jyri Aalto; Jari Eriksson	Nina Sundberg; Sara Ussher	Edvard Bjorkenheim; Nina Sarnesto
1995	Robert Liljequist	Nina Sarnesto	Tony Tuominen; Mikael Segercrantz	Nina Sarnesto; Emmi Heikkinen	Jyri Aalto; Nina Sarnesto
1996	Robert Liljequist	Anu Weckström	Tony Tuominen; Mikael Segercrantz	Malin Virta; Nadja Hamalainen	Mikael Segercrantz; Emmi Heikkinen
1997	Robert Liljequist	Anu Weckström	Mikael Segerrrantz; Lasse Lindelöf	Katja Narkio; Nadja Hamalainen	Tony Tuomien; Leena Loytomaki
1998	Pontus Jantti	Anu Weckström	Ilkka Nyquist; Ville Kinnunen	Marjaana Moilanen; Malin Virta	Jimm Aalto; Nina Sarnesto
1999	Jyri Aalto	Anu Weckström	Ville Kinnunen; Kuka Nyquist	Anu Weckström; Nina Weckström	Mikka Franstick; Marjaana Moilanen
2000	Jyri Aalto	Anu Weckström	Ilkka Nyqvist; Antti Viitikko	Anu Weckström; Nina Weckström	Kasperi Salo; Anu Weckström
2001	Jyri Aalto	Anu Weckström	Antti Viitikko; Alexander Böök	Anu Weckström; Nina Weckström	Tuomas Karhula; Nina Sarnesto
2002	Kasperi Salo	Anu Weckström	Antti Viitikko; Alexander Böök	Anu Weckström; Nina Weckström	Janne Syysjoki; Anu Weckström
2003	Antti Viitikko	Anu Weckström	Petri Hyyryläinen; Tuomas Karhula	Anu Weckström; Nina Weckström	Petri Hyyryläinen; Maria Väisänen
2004	Kasperi Salo	Anu Weckström	Petri Hyyryläinen; Alexander Böök	Anu Weckström; Nina Weckström	Petri Hyyryläinen; Maria Väisänen
2005	Ville Lång	Elina Väisänen	Petri Hyyryläinen; Tuomas Karhula	Saara Hynninen; Leena Löytömäki	Tuomas Karhula; Leena Löytömäki
2006	Ville Lång	Anu Nieminen	Tuomas Karhula; Antti Viitikko	Anu Nieminen; Nina Weckström	Tuomas Karhula; Leena Löytömäki
2007	Ville Lång	Anu Nieminen	Tuomas Nuorteva; Mikko Vikman	Maria Väisänen; Elina Väisänen	Petri Hyyryläinen; Sanni Rautala
2008	Ville Lång	Anu Nieminen	Ilkka Nyqvist; Tuomas Palmqvist	Leena Löytömäki; Saara Hynninen	Antti Viitikko; Anu Nieminen
2009	Ville Lång	Nanna Vainio	Petri Hyyryläinen; Tuomas Karhula	Leena Löytömäki; Saara Hynninen	Tuomas Nuorteva; Sanni Rautala
2010	Ville Lång	Nanna Vainio	Ville Lång; Mikko Vikman	Sanni Rautala; Noora Virta	Tuomas Nuorteva; Sanni Rautala
2011	Ville Lång	Nanna Vainio	Ville Lång; Mikko Vikman	Sanni Rautala; Saara Hynninen	Anton Kaisti; Jenny Nyström
2012	Ville Lång	Nanna Vainio	Eetu Heino; Oskari Saarinen	Airi Mikkelä; Nanna Vainio	Anton Kaisti; Jenny Nyström
2013	Ville Lång	Sonja Pekkola	Iikka Heino; Mika Köngäs	Mathilda Lindholm; Jenny Nyström	Anton Kaisti; Jenny Nyström
2014	Ville Lång	Airi Mikkelä	Kasper Lehikoinen; Marko Pyykönen	Sonja Pekkola; Sanni Rautala	Anton Kaisti; Jenny Nyström
2015	Anton Kaisti	Nanna Vainio	Marko Pyykönen; Pekka Ryhänen	Sonja Pekkola; Sanni Rautala	Henri Aarnio; Jenny Nyström
2016	Kalle Koljonen	Nanna Vainio	Henri Aarnio; Iikka Heino	Sonja Pekkola; Sanni Rautala	Anton Kaisti; Mathilda Lindholm
2017	Kasper Lehikoinen	Airi Mikkelä	Ville Lång; Pekka Ryhänen	Sonja Pekkola; Jenny Nyström	Anton Kaisti; Jenny Nyström
2018	Kalle Koljonen	Airi Mikkelä	Henri Aarnio; Iikka Heino	Sonja Pekkola; Jenny Nyström	Anton Kaisti; Jenny Nyström
2019	Eetu Heino	Airi Mikkelä	Anton Kaisti; Oskari Larkimo	Sonja Pekkola; Airi Mikkelä	Iikka Heino; Jenny Nyström
2020	Valtteri Nieminen	Julia Salonen	Anton Kaisti; Oskari Larkimo	Mathilda Lindholm; Jenny Nyström	Anton Kaisti; Inalotta Suutarinen
2021	Joakim Oldorff	Nella Nyqvist	Miika Lahtinen; Jere Övermark	Mathilda Lindholm; Jenny Nyström	Anton Kaisti; Iina Suutarinen
2022	Kalle Koljonen	Nella Siilasmaa	Tony Lindelöf; Joakim Oldorff	Mathilda Lindholm; Jenny Nyström	Anton Kaisti; Iina Suutarinen
2023	Joakim Oldorff	Nella Nyqvist	Anton Kaisti; Joonas Korhonen	Nella Nyqvist; Jenny Vähäsarja	Anton Kaisti; Iina Suutarinen
2024	Joakim Oldorff	Nella Nyqvist	Anton Kaisti; Joonas Korhonen	Nella Nyqvist; Jenny Vähäsarja	Anton Kaisti; Iina Suutarinen
2025	Joakim Oldorff	Nella Nyqvist	Anton Kaisti; Joonas Korhonen	Nella Nyqvist; Jenny Vähäsarja	Anton Kaisti; Iina Suutarinen
