= 2017 German Open Grand Prix Gold =

Tournament details
- Dates: 28 February – 5 March 2017
- Level: Grand Prix Gold
- Total prize money: US$120,000
- Venue: Innogy Sporthalle
- Location: Mulheim an der Ruhr, Germany

Champions
- Men's singles: (Chinese Taipei) Chou Tien-chen
- Women's singles: (Japan) Akane Yamaguchi
- Men's doubles: (Denmark) Kim Astrup (Denmark) Anders Skaarup Rasmussen
- Women's doubles: (Japan) Yuki Fukushima (Japan) Sayaka Hirota
- Mixed doubles: (China) Zhang Nan (China) Li Yinhui

The 2017 German Open Grand Prix Gold was the fourth Grand Prix's badminton tournament of the 2017 BWF Grand Prix Gold and Grand Prix. The tournament was held at the Innogy Sporthalle in Mulheim an der Ruhr, Germany on 28 February–5 March 2017 and had a total purse of $120,000.

== Men's singles ==
=== Seeds ===
1. (Denmark) Jan Ø. Jørgensen (withdrew)
2. (China) Chen Long (semifinals)
3. (China) Lin Dan (third round)
4. (China) Tian Houwei (first round)
5. (Hong Kong) Ng Ka Long (quarterfinals)
6. (Chinese Taipei) Chou Tien-chen (champion)
7. (Germany) Marc Zwiebler (second round)
8. (Hong Kong) Hu Yun (third round)
9. (Denmark) Hans-Kristian Vittinghus (quarterfinals)
10. (England) Rajiv Ouseph (second round)
11. (Hong Kong) Wong Wing Ki (second round)
12. (India) Srikanth Kidambi (third round)
13. (Hong Kong) Wei Nan (first round)
14. (Chinese Taipei) Wang Tzu-wei (final)
15. (Chinese Taipei) Hsu Jen-hao (first round)
16. (Denmark) Anders Antonsen (third round)

=== Finals ===
Quarterfinals
(Japan) Takuma Ueda	14	21	21
5	(Hong Kong) Ng Ka Long	21	17	15
(Denmark) Emil Holst	10	14
6	(Chinese Taipei) Chou Tien-chen	21	21
(Croatia) Zvonimir Đurkinjak	19	9
14	(Chinese Taipei) Wang Tzu-wei	21	21
9	(Denmark) Hans-Kristian Vittinghus	10	3^{r}
2	(China) Chen Long	21	5

Semifinals
(Japan) Takuma Ueda	17	11
6	(Chinese Taipei) Chou Tien-chen	21	21
14	(Chinese Taipei) Wang Tzu-wei	21	8	21
2	(China) Chen Long	18	21	18

Final
6	(Chinese Taipei) Chou Tien-chen	21	21
14	(Chinese Taipei) Wang Tzu-wei	16	14

=== Top half ===
==== Section 1 ====
First round
PFQ	(Ukraine) D Zavadsky	13	21	17
(Sweden) H Hurskainen	21	16	21
(Netherlands) N Fransman	13	12
(Germany) F Roth	21	21
15	(Chinese Taipei) Hsu J-h	13	17
(Japan) T Ueda	21	21
(Poland) M Rogalski	21	14	7
(Netherlands) E Meijs	18	21	21

Second round
(Sweden) H Hurskainen	16	17
(Germany) F Roth	21	21
(Japan) T Ueda	21	24	21
(Netherlands) E Meijs	10	26	12

Third round
(Germany) F Roth	21	19	16
(Japan) T Ueda	10	21	21

==== Section 2 ====
First round
5	(Hong Kong) Ng K L	21	21
Q8	(Germany) M Weisskirchen	10	9
(India) S Dey	16	21	21
(China) Zhao JP	21	17	19
10	(England) R Ouseph	20	21	28
PFQ	(Japan) Y Igarashi	22	17	26
Q1	(Germany) S Hsiao	17	16
(Estonia) R Must	21	21

Second round
5	(Hong Kong) Ng K L	21	21
(India) S Dey	14	8
10	(England) R Ouseph
(Estonia) R Must	w	/	o

Third round
5	(Hong Kong) Ng K L	w	/	o
(Estonia) R Must

==== Section 3 ====
First round
3	(China) Lin D	21	21
(India) S Verma	13	10
Q6	(Poland) M Dubowski	21	21
(Finland) A Kaisti	17	14
11	(Hong Kong) Wong W K	21	21
(Finland) E Heino	19	9
(Ukraine) A Pochtarov	11	6
(Denmark) E Holst	21	21

Second round
3	(China) Lin D	21	21
Q6	(Poland) M Dubowski	14	16
11	(Hong Kong) Wong W K	18	18
(Denmark) E Holst	21	21

Third round
3	(China) Lin D	10	16
(Denmark) E Holst	21	21

==== Section 4 ====
First round
6	(Chinese Taipei) Chou T-c	21	21
(India) H Dani	13	12
(Czech Republic) M Ludík	18	13
(France) B Leverdez	21	21
16	(Denmark) A Antonsen	21	14	21
(Japan) H Shimono	13	21	14
Q5	(Germany) S Wang	25	21	21
Q4	(Germany) A Roovers	27	16	17

Second round
6	(Chinese Taipei) Chou T-c	19	21	21
(France) B Leverdez	21	14	11
16	(Denmark) A Antonsen	21	21
Q5	(Germany) S Wang	13	18

Third round
6	(Chinese Taipei) Chou T-c	17	21	22
16	(Denmark) A Antonsen	21	11	20

=== Bottom half ===
==== Section 5 ====
First round
(Croatia) Z Đurkinjak	21	21
(Japan) K Sakai	17	11
(Denmark) C L Thomsen	21	16	20
13	(Hong Kong) Wei N	17	21	15^{r}
(Denmark) K Bruun	21	21
Q3	(Germany) P Discher	14	12
(Scotland) K Merrilees	11	23	17
7	(Germany) M Zwiebler	21	21	21

Second round
(Croatia) Z Đurkinjak	21	21
(Denmark) C L Thomsen	11	11
(Denmark) K Bruun	21	11
7	(Germany) M Zwiebler	10	6^{r}

Third round
(Croatia) Z Đurkinjak	21	21
(Denmark) K Bruun	12	16

==== Section 6 ====
First round
(Chinese Taipei) Lin Y-h	22	21
(Denmark) R Gemke	20	15
(Republic of Ireland) J Magee	9	9
14	(Chinese Taipei) Wang T-w	21	21
(Israel) M Zilberman	21	21
(India) R Y Chittaboina	18	18
(Japan) K Tsuneyama	21	21
4	(China) Tian HW	15	15

Second round
(Chinese Taipei) Lin Y-h	21	19	12
14	(Chinese Taipei) Wang T-w	11	21	21
(Israel) M Zilberman	7	6
(Japan) K Tsuneyama	21	21

Third round
14	(Chinese Taipei) Wang T-w	21	21
(Japan) K Tsuneyama	16	15

==== Section 7 ====
First round
(Germany) K Schaefer	17	21	15
(Finland) K Koljonen	21	8	21
(England) T Penty	21	21	16
9	(Denmark) H-K Vittinghus	17	23	21
(United States) B Seguin	21	8	16
Q2	(India) H Aggarwal	18	21	21
(Germany) L Schaenzler	12	21	14
8	(Hong Kong) Hu Y	21	19	21

Second round
(Finland) K Koljonen	12	12
9	(Denmark) H-K Vittinghus	21	21
Q2	(India) H Aggarwal	15	11
8	(Hong Kong) Hu Y	21	21

Third round
9	(Denmark) H-K Vittinghus	21	12	22
8	(Hong Kong) Hu Y	9	21	20

==== Section 8 ====
First round
(Japan) Y Onodera	21	19	21
(Netherlands) M Caljouw	18	21	16
(Slovenia) A Roj	4	11
12	(India) S Kidambi	21	21
Q7	(Austria) W Gnedt	15	21	16
(England) S Parsons	21	17	21
(Japan) K Nishimoto	10	9
2	(China) Chen L	21	21

Second round
(Japan) Y Onodera	17	18
12	(India) S Kidambi	21	21
(England) S Parsons	10	6
2	(China) Chen L	21	21

Third round
12	(India) S Kidambi	19	20
2	(China) Chen L	21	22

== Women's singles ==
=== Seeds ===
1. (Spain) Carolina Marín (final)
2. (Japan) Akane Yamaguchi (champion)
3. (Thailand) Busanan Ongbamrungphan (second round)
4. (United States) Zhang Beiwen (semifinals)
5. (Hong Kong) Cheung Ngan Yi (quarterfinals)
6. (Thailand) Nitchaon Jindapol (quarterfinals)
7. (Japan) Sayaka Sato (quarterfinals)
8. (Japan) Ayumi Mine (quarterfinals)

=== Finals ===
Semifinals
1	(Spain) Carolina Marín	21	17	21
(Japan) Minatsu Mitani	10	21	18
4	(United States) Zhang Beiwen	22	19
2	(Japan) Akane Yamaguchi	24	21

Final
1	(Spain) Carolina Marín
2	(Japan) Akane Yamaguchi	w	/	o

=== Top half ===
==== Section 1 ====
First round
1	(Spain) C Marín	19	21	21
(Denmark) L Kjærsfeldt	21	11	11
(India) T Lad	14	12
Q3	(Indonesia) P Siahaya	21	21
7	(Japan) S Sato	21	22
(Chinese Taipei) Chiang M-h	19	20
(Hong Kong) Yip P Y	17	22	18
(Finland) N Vainio	21	20	21

Second round
1	(Spain) C Marín	21	21
Q3	(Indonesia) P Siahaya	15	8
7	(Japan) S Sato	21	21
(Finland) N Vainio	9	5

Quarterfinals
1	(Spain) C Marín	21	17	21
7	(Japan) S Sato	17	21	13

==== Section 2 ====
First round
3	(Thailand) B Ongbamrungphan	21	21
(Russia) N Perminova	11	10
(Japan) M Mitani	21	21	21
(Denmark) M Blichfeldt	23	10	17
8	(Japan) A Mine	21	21
(Ukraine) M Ulitina	16	19
Q1	(Germany) Y Li	19	23	21
(Germany) O Konon	21	21	18

Second round
3	(Thailand) B Ongbamrungphan	19	21	11
(Japan) M Mitani	21	17	21
8	(Japan) A Mine	21	21
Q1	(Germany) Y Li	8	19

Quarterfinals
(Japan) M Mitani	10	21	21
8	(Japan) A Mine	21	18	5

=== Bottom half ===
==== Section 3 ====
First round
(Spain) B Corrales	11	16
(Chinese Taipei) Hsu Y-c	21	21
(Denmark) N K Rohde	13	15
6	(Thailand) N Jindapol	21	21
Q2	(Chinese Taipei) Sung S-y	21	18	7
(Chinese Taipei) Lee C-h	19	21	21
(Singapore) Liang XY	15	10
4	(United States) Zhang BW	21	21

Second round
(Chinese Taipei) Hsu Y-c	11	11
6	(Thailand) N Jindapol	21	21
(Chinese Taipei) Lee C-h	13	11
4	(United States) Zhang BW	21	21

Quarterfinals
6	(Thailand) N Jindapol	19	20
4	(United States) Zhang BW	21	22

==== Section 4 ====
First round
(Indonesia) L A Mainaky	21	22
(Finland) A Mikkela	11	20
(Russia) K Polikarpova	19	10
5	(Hong Kong) Cheung N Y	21	21
(Switzerland) S Jaquet	16	21	21
Q4	(Denmark) S H Dahl	21	15	12
(Denmark) M Poulsen	19	19
2	(Japan) A Yamaguchi	21	21

Second round
(Indonesia) L A Mainaky	9	13
5	(Hong Kong) Cheung N Y	21	21
(Switzerland) S Jaquet	21	13	14
2	(Japan) A Yamaguchi	16	21	21

Quarterfinals
5	(Hong Kong) Cheung N Y	22	18	17
2	(Japan) A Yamaguchi	20	21	21

== Men's doubles ==
=== Seeds ===
1. (Japan) Takeshi Kamura / Keigo Sonoda (first round)
2. (Denmark) Mads Conrad-Petersen / Mads Pieler Kolding (final)
3. (Russia) Vladimir Ivanov / Ivan Sozonov (semifinals)
4. (Denmark) Kim Astrup / Anders Skaarup Rasmussen (champion)
5. (Chinese Taipei) Lee Jhe-huei / Lee Yang (second round)
6. (England) Marcus Ellis / Chris Langridge (first round)
7. (Chinese Taipei) Chen Hung-ling / Wang Chi-lin (quarterfinals)
8. (Thailand) Bodin Issara / Nipitphon Puangpuapech (quarterfinals)

=== Finals ===
Semifinals

Final

- (Japan) Hiroyuki Endo
- (Japan) Yuta Watanabe
15
21
19

4
(Denmark) Kim Astrup
(Denmark) Anders Skaarup Rasmussen
21
14
21

4
- (Denmark) Kim Astrup
21
21

2
- (Denmark) Mads Conrad-Petersen
17
13

3
- (Russia) Vladimir Ivanov
- (Russia) Ivan Sozonov
14
16

2
- (Denmark) Mads Conrad-Petersen
21
21

=== Top half ===
==== Section 1 ====
First round

Second round

Quarterfinals

1
- (Japan) T Kamura
- (Japan) K Sonoda
15
23

- (Denmark) M Christiansen
- (Denmark) D Daugaard
21
25

- (Denmark) M Christiansen
- (Denmark) D Daugaard
22
11

- (Japan) H Endo
- (Japan) Y Watanabe
24
21

- (Japan) H Endo
- (Japan) Y Watanabe
21
21

Q2
- (Denmark) M Bay-Smidt
- (Denmark) F Søgaard Mortensen
14
16

- (Japan) H Endo
- (Japan) Y Watanabe
21
21

8
- (Thailand) B Issara
- (Thailand) N Puangpuapech
14
13

8
- (Thailand) B Issara
- (Thailand) N Puangpuapech
21
16
21

- (Singapore) Terry Hee Y K
- (Singapore) Loh K H
17
21
13

8
- (Thailand) B Issara
- (Thailand) N Puangpuapech
21
21

- (Hong Kong) Law C H
- (Hong Kong) Lee C H
15
15

- (Hong Kong) Law C H
- (Hong Kong) Lee C H
22
21

- (Republic of Ireland) J Magee
- (Republic of Ireland) S Magee
20
14

==== Section 2 ====
First round

Second round

Quarterfinals

4
- (Denmark) K Astrup
21
16
21

- (Chinese Taipei) Lu C-y
- (Chinese Taipei) Yang P-h
9
21
17

4
- (Denmark) K Astrup
24
21

- (Germany) J R Jansen
- (Germany) J Zurwonne
22
13

- (Japan) T Inoue
- (Japan) Y Kaneko
17
16

- (Germany) J R Jansen
- (Germany) J Zurwonne
21
21

4
- (Denmark) K Astrup
21
22
21

- (China) Lu K
- (China) Zheng SW
19
24
14

5
- (Chinese Taipei) Lee J-h
- (Chinese Taipei) Lee Y
21
21

PFQ
- (Russia) K Abramov
- (Russia) A Zinchenko
9
13

5
- (Chinese Taipei) Lee J-h
- (Chinese Taipei) Lee Y
22
9

- (China) Lu K
- (China) Zheng SW
24
21

- (Belgium) M Dierickx
- (Belgium) F Golinski
15
3

- (China) Lu K
- (China) Zheng SW
21
21

=== Bottom half ===
==== Section 3 ====
First round

Second round

Quarterfinals

Q3
- (Malaysia) M R Abdul Latif
- (Malaysia) M H Hashim
21
13
13

Q4
- (Netherlands) J Arends
- (Netherlands) R Jille
16
21
21

Q4
- (Netherlands) J Arends
- (Netherlands) R Jille
8
16

7
- (Chinese Taipei) Chen H-l
- (Chinese Taipei) Wang C-l
21
21

PFQ
- (Netherlands) J Maas
- (Netherlands) R Tabeling
19
12

7
- (Chinese Taipei) Chen H-l
- (Chinese Taipei) Wang C-l
21
21

7
- (Chinese Taipei) Chen H-l
- (Chinese Taipei) Wang C-l
16
22

3
- (Russia) V Ivanov
- (Russia) I Sozonov
21
24

- (Hong Kong) Or C C
- (Hong Kong) Tang C M
21
21

- (Germany) R Beck
- (Germany) P Kaesbauer
15
16

- (Hong Kong) Or C C
- (Hong Kong) Tang C M
10
21
9

3
- (Russia) V Ivanov
- (Russia) I Sozonov
21
14
21

Q1
- (Poland) A Cwalina
- (Poland) P Pietryja
15
11

3
- (Russia) V Ivanov
- (Russia) I Sozonov
21
21

==== Section 4 ====
First round

Second round

Quarterfinals

- (Sweden) R Eidestedt
- (Sweden) N Ruponen
21
21

- (Chinese Taipei) Liao K-h
- (Chinese Taipei) Lu C-p
17
11

- (Sweden) R Eidestedt
- (Sweden) N Ruponen
11
17

- (China) Huang KX
- (China) Wang YL
21
21

- (China) Huang KX
- (China) Wang YL
21
23

6
- (England) M Ellis
- (England) C Langridge
18
21

- (China) Huang KX
- (China) Wang YL
11
18

2
- (Denmark) M Conrad-Petersen
21
21

- (Singapore) D B Chrisnanta
- (Singapore) H Wijaya
10
13

- (Japan) T Hoki
- (Japan) Y Kobayashi
21
21

- (Japan) T Hoki
- (Japan) Y Kobayashi
13
14

2
- (Denmark) M Conrad-Petersen
21
21

- (Indonesia) H Setiawan
- (Malaysia) Tan B H
21
17
15

2
- (Denmark) M Conrad-Petersen
14
21
21

== Women's doubles ==
=== Seeds ===
1. (Japan) Naoko Fukuman / Kurumi Yonao (second round)
2. (Thailand) Jongkolphan Kititharakul / Rawinda Prajongjai (quarterfinals)
3. (Bulgaria) Gabriela Stoeva / Stefani Stoeva (quarterfinals)
4. (Indonesia) Della Destiara Haris / Rosyita Eka Putri Sari (quarterfinals)
5. (China) Huang Dongping / Li Yinhui (final)
6. (Netherlands) Eefje Muskens / Selena Piek (withdrew)
7. (Indonesia) Greysia Polii / Rizki Amelia Pradipta (second round)
8. (Japan) Shiho Tanaka / Koharu Yonemoto (semifinals)

=== Finals ===
Semifinals

Final

- (Germany) Isabel Herttrich
- (Germany) Carla Nelte
19
10

- (Japan) Yuki Fukushima
- (Japan) Sayaka Hirota
21
21

- (Japan) Yuki Fukushima
- (Japan) Sayaka Hirota
15
21
21

5
- (China) Huang Dongping
- (China) Li Yinhui
21
17
15

8
- (Japan) Shiho Tanaka
- (Japan) Koharu Yonemoto
14
13

5
- (China) Huang Dongping
- (China) Li Yinhui
21
21

=== Top half ===
==== Section 1 ====
First round

Second round

Quarterfinals

1
- (Japan) N Fukuman
- (Japan) K Yonao
21
21

- (Denmark) M Fruergaard
- (Denmark) S Thygesen
19
9

1
- (Japan) N Fukuman
- (Japan) K Yonao
18
21
17

- (Germany) I Herttrich
- (Germany) C Nelte
21
8
21

- (Germany) I Herttrich
- (Germany) C Nelte
21
21

Q2
- (Finland) J Nyström
- (Finland) S Pekkola
13
10

- (Germany) I Herttrich
- (Germany) C Nelte
14
21
21

- (Chinese Taipei) Hsu Y-c
- (Chinese Taipei) Wu T-j
21
19
13

PFQ
- (Germany) A Horbach
- (Germany) T Wurm
10
13

- (Chinese Taipei) Hsu Y-c
- (Chinese Taipei) Wu T-j
21
21

- (Chinese Taipei) Hsu Y-c
- (Chinese Taipei) Wu T-j
21
21

- (Chinese Taipei) Lin X-m
- (Chinese Taipei) Wu F-c
18
16

- (Chinese Taipei) Lin X-m
- (Chinese Taipei) Wu F-c
21
29
21

- (Russia) A Chervyakova
- (Russia) O Morozova
15
30
13

==== Section 2 ====
First round

Second round

Quarterfinals

3
- (Bulgaria) G Stoeva
- (Bulgaria) S Stoeva
21
21

Q3
- (Chinese Taipei) Chang C-h
- (Chinese Taipei) Yang C-t
16
12

3
- (Bulgaria) G Stoeva
- (Bulgaria) S Stoeva
21
21

- (China) Huang YQ
- (China) Tang JH
15
17

- (Denmark) A K Hansen
- (Denmark) M L Steffensen
6
15

- (China) Huang YQ
- (China) Tang JH
21
21

3
- (Bulgaria) G Stoeva
- (Bulgaria) S Stoeva
17
17

- (Japan) Y Fukushima
- (Japan) S Hirota
21
21

7
- (Indonesia) G Polii
- (Indonesia) R A Pradipta
21
21

- (Germany) L Kaminski
- (Germany) H Pohl
3
8

7
- (Indonesia) G Polii
- (Indonesia) R A Pradipta
21
18
12

- (Japan) Y Fukushima
- (Japan) S Hirota
19
21
21

PFQ
- (Chinese Taipei) Chang H-t
- (Chinese Taipei) Sung S-y
8
10

- (Japan) Y Fukushima
- (Japan) S Hirota
21
21

=== Bottom half ===
==== Section 3 ====
First round

Second round

Quarterfinals

- (Denmark) J Finne-Ipsen
- (Denmark) R Søby
21
21

- (Sweden) C Nistad
- (Sweden) E Wengberg
8
16

- (Denmark) J Finne-Ipsen
- (Denmark) R Søby
12
12

8
- (Japan) S Tanaka
- (Japan) K Yonemoto
21
21

Q1
- (Germany) L Efler
- (Germany) E Janssens
8
12

8
- (Japan) S Tanaka
- (Japan) K Yonemoto
21
21

8
- (Japan) S Tanaka
- (Japan) K Yonemoto
21
21

4
- (Indonesia) D D Haris
15
13

- (Chinese Taipei) Chiang K-h
- (Chinese Taipei) Hung S-h
21
15

- (China) Bao YX
- (China) Yu XH
23
21

- (China) Bao YX
- (China) Yu XH
16
22

4
- (Indonesia) D D Haris
21
24

Q4
- (Germany) A Dörr
- (Germany) J Karnott
10
8

4
- (Indonesia) D D Haris
21
21

==== Section 4 ====
First round

Second round

Quarterfinals

- (Switzerland) N Fankhauser
- (Malaysia) S Saniru
16
21
18

- (Netherlands) C Seinen
- (Netherlands) I Tabeling
21
17
21

- (Netherlands) C Seinen
- (Netherlands) I Tabeling
19
15

5
- (China) Huang DP
- (China) Li YH
21
21

- (England) L Smith
- (England) S Walker
8
8

5
- (China) Huang DP
- (China) Li YH
21
21

5
- (China) Huang DP
- (China) Li YH
21
22

2
- (Thailand) J Kititharakul
14
20

- (Ukraine) N Voytsekh
- (Ukraine) Y Zharka
2
15

PFQ
- (Japan) A Higashino
- (Japan) A Kurihara
21
21

PFQ
- (Japan) A Higashino
- (Japan) A Kurihara
21
16
13

2
- (Thailand) J Kititharakul
15
21
21

- (Germany) J Goliszewski
- (Germany) L Kaepplein
14
10

2
- (Thailand) J Kititharakul
21
21

== Mixed doubles ==
=== Seeds ===
1. (China) Lu Kai / Huang Yaqiong (final)
2. (Malaysia) Chan Peng Soon / Goh Liu Ying (quarterfinals)
3. (England) Chris Adcock / Gabrielle Adcock (semifinals)
4. (Malaysia) Tan Kian Meng / Lai Pei Jing (semifinals)
5. (Thailand) Bodin Isara / Savitree Amitrapai (second round)
6. (Japan) Kenta Kazuno / Ayane Kurihara (quarterfinals)
7. (Hong Kong) Tang Chun Man / Tse Ying Suet (withdrew)
8. (China) Zhang Nan / Li Yinhui (champion)

=== Finals ===
Semifinals

Final

1
- (China) Lu Kai
- (China) Huang Yaqiong
16
21
21

4
- (Malaysia) Tan Kian Meng
- (Malaysia) Lai Pei Jing
21
16
17

1
- (China) Lu Kai
- (China) Huang Yaqiong
20
11

8
- (China) Zhang Nan
- (China) Li Yinhui
22
21

3
- (England) Chris Adcock
- (England) Gabrielle Adcock
26
19

8
- (China) Zhang Nan
- (China) Li Yinhui
28
21

=== Top half ===
==== Section 1 ====
First round

Second round

Quarterfinals

1
- (China) Lu K
- (China) Huang YQ
w
/
o

- (Sweden) N Ruponen
- (Sweden) A Hogstrom

1
- (China) Lu K
- (China) Huang YQ
14
21
21

- (China) Xu C
- (China) Du Y
21
13
13

Q4
- (England) M Ellis
- (England) L Smith
21
18
21

- (China) Xu C
- (China) Du Y
14
21
23

1
- (China) Lu K
- (China) Huang YQ
21
21

6
- (Japan) K Kazuno
- (Japan) A Kurihara
10
16

6
- (Japan) K Kazuno
- (Japan) A Kurihara
21
21

- (Chinese Taipei) Lee Y
- (Chinese Taipei) Hsu Y-c
12
10

6
- (Japan) K Kazuno
- (Japan) A Kurihara
21
21

- (Chinese Taipei) Lu C-y
- (Chinese Taipei) Chiang K-h
11
11

- (Chinese Taipei) Lu C-y
- (Chinese Taipei) Chiang K-h
21
22

- (Denmark) S Gravholt
- (Denmark) M Fruergaard
19
20

==== Section 2 ====
First round

Second round

Quarterfinals

4
- (Malaysia) Tan K M
- (Malaysia) Lai P J
21
18
21

- (Germany) M Fuchs
- (Germany) B Overzier
17
21
16

4
- (Malaysia) Tan K M
- (Malaysia) Lai P J
21
21

- (Thailand) N Puangpuapech
16
17

- (Thailand) N Puangpuapech
19
21
21

- (England) B Lane
- (England) J Pugh
21
19
16

4
- (Malaysia) Tan K M
- (Malaysia) Lai P J
21
14
21

PFQ
- (Chinese Taipei) Wang C-l
- (Chinese Taipei) Lee C-h
16
21
17

PFQ
- (Chinese Taipei) Wang C-l
- (Chinese Taipei) Lee C-h
21
21

- (Japan) Y Watanabe
- (Japan) A Higashino
17
19

PFQ
- (Chinese Taipei) Wang C-l
- (Chinese Taipei) Lee C-h
22
21

- (Chinese Taipei) Chang K-c
- (Chinese Taipei) Chang H-t
20
7

Q1
- (Switzerland) O Schaller
- (Switzerland) C Burkart
11
18

- (Chinese Taipei) Chang K-c
- (Chinese Taipei) Chang H-t
21
21

=== Bottom half ===
==== Section 3 ====
First round

Second round

Quarterfinals

- (Hong Kong) Lee C H
- (Hong Kong) Chau H W
12
21
19

Q3
- (Germany) R Beck
- (Germany) C Nelte
21
11
21

Q3
- (Germany) R Beck
- (Germany) C Nelte
14
21
23

5
- (Thailand) B Issara
- (Thailand) S Amitrapai
21
18
21

- (Poland) R Mateusiak
- (Poland) N Zieba
11
10

5
- (Thailand) B Issara
- (Thailand) S Amitrapai
21
21

Q3
- (Germany) R Beck
- (Germany) C Nelte
18
12

3
- (England) C Adcock
- (England) G Adcock
21
21

- (Denmark) M Christiansen
- (Denmark) S Thygesen
15
18

- (Indonesia) H Faisal
- (Indonesia) S D Aulia
21
21

- (Indonesia) H Faisal
- (Indonesia) S D Aulia
21
21
19

3
- (England) C Adcock
- (England) G Adcock
18
23
21

- (Chinese Taipei) Lin C-y
- (Chinese Taipei) Wu T-j
21
8
16

3
- (England) C Adcock
- (England) G Adcock
17
21
21

==== Section 4 ====
First round

Second round

Quarterfinals

- (Singapore) T Hee
- (Singapore) Tan W H
21
19
21

- (Netherlands) R Tabeling
- (Netherlands) C Seinen
10
21
17

- (Singapore) T Hee
- (Singapore) Tan W H
8
19

8
- (China) Zhang N
- (China) Li YH
21
21

- (Republic of Ireland) S Magee
- (Republic of Ireland) C Magee
17
21
14

8
- (China) Zhang N
- (China) Li YH
21
19
21

8
- (China) Zhang N
- (China) Li YH
21
18
25

2
- (Malaysia) Chan P S
- (Malaysia) Goh L Y
13
21
23

- (Germany) M Lamsfuß
- (Germany) I Herttrich
21
21

- (Japan) Y Kobayashi
- (Japan) K Yonemoto
14
12

- (Germany) M Lamsfuß
- (Germany) I Herttrich
15
21
21

2
- (Malaysia) Chan P S
- (Malaysia) Goh L Y
21
16
23

Q2
- (Finland) A Kaisti
- (Finland) J Nyström
6
7

2
- (Malaysia) Chan P S
- (Malaysia) Goh L Y
21
21

Preceded by 2017 Thailand Masters Grand Prix Gold	BWF Grand Prix Gold and Grand Prix; 2017 BWF Season	Succeeded by 2017 Swiss Open Grand Prix Gold
