= Nina Weckström =

Finnish badminton player (born 1979)

Personal information
- Born: 10 August 1979 (age 47)
- Height: 1.64 m (5 ft 5 in)

Sport
- Country: Finland
- Sport: Badminton
- Handedness: Right
- Event: Women's singles & doubles

Women's singles & doubles
- BWF profile

Nina Weckström (born 10 August 1979) is a Finnish badminton player from Helsingfors badminton klub. She won the National Championships in the women's doubles event seven times from 1999 to 2004 and 2006 partnered with Anu Weckström. In the international tournament, she won the women's singles title at the Southern Pan Am International in Miami, United States, and also the women's doubles event at the Norwegian International tournament with her sister Anu. After finishing her career in badminton, she received the scholarship by the URA Foundation. She educated Pedagogy in Copenhagen, and while she studying, she trained at the Holte Badmintonklub.

== Achievements ==
=== BWF International Challenge/Series ===
Women's singles
Year	Tournament	Opponent	Score	Result
2002	Italian International	(Russia) Maria Kazakova	5–11, 8–11	(silver) Runner-up
2006	Southern Pan Am International	(Italy) Agnese Allegrini	21–16, 21–17	(gold) Winner

Women's doubles
Year	Tournament	Partner	Opponent	Score	Result
2000	Norwegian International	(Finland) Anu Weckström	(Sweden) Caroline Eriksson (Sweden) Johanna Persson	10–15, 15–10, 15–7	(gold) Winner
2008	Slovenian International	(Germany) Claudia Vogelgsang	(Sweden) Emelie Lennartsson (Sweden) Emma Wengberg	9–21, 11–21	(silver) Runner-up

Commonwealth Youth Games tournament
BWF International Series tournament
