= Iikka Heino =

Finnish badminton player (born 1995)

Personal information
- Born: 9 January 1995 (age 31) Pargas, Finland
- Height: 1.73 m (5 ft 8 in)

Sport
- Country: Finland
- Sport: Badminton
- Handedness: Right

Men's singles & doubles
- Highest ranking: 98 (MS 12 March 2019); 74 (MD with Henri Aarnio 7 September 2017); 117 (XD with Jenny Nyström 14 May 2019)
- BWF profile
Medal record
Men's badminton
Representing Finland
European Men's Team Championships
Bronze medal – third place	2014 Basel	Men's team

Iikka Heino (born 9 January 1995) is a Finnish badminton player. In 2011, he won the gold medal at the European U17 Championships in the mixed doubles event with Mathilda Lindholm. In 2013, he became the runner-up of Estonian International in men's doubles event. In 2014, he won a bronze medal at the European Men's Team Championships in Basel. In 2017, he was a runner-up of the Estonian International tournament in the men's doubles event partnered with Henri Aarnio.

== Personal life ==
Iikka Heino brother, Eetu Heino, is also a professional badminton players. He started to playing badminton at the age of six in Paraisten, and entered the national team in 2011. To improve his badminton, Iika Heino lives and trains in Holbæk, Denmark.

== Achievements ==
=== BWF International Challenge/Series (3 runners-up) ===
Men's doubles
Year	Tournament	Partner	Opponent	Score	Result
2013	Estonian International	(Finland) Mika Köngäs	(France) Laurent Constantin (France) Matthieu Lo Ying Ping	11–21, 20–22	(silver) Runner-up
2017	Estonian International	(Finland) Henri Aarnio	(France) Bastian Kersaudy (France) Julien Maio	13–21, 14–21	(silver) Runner-up
2017	Hellas Open	(Finland) Henri Aarnio	(Denmark) Kasper Antonsen (Denmark) Niclas Nøhr	17–21, 12–21	(silver) Runner-up

BWF International Challenge tournament
BWF International Series tournament
BWF Future Series tournament
