= Nikolaj Overgaard =

Danish badminton player (born 1992)

Personal information
- Born: 8 September 1992 (age 34)

Sport
- Country: Denmark
- Sport: Badminton

Men's & mixed doubles
- Highest ranking: 34 (MD 3 April 2014); 220 (XD 17 May 2012)
- BWF profile
Medal record
Men's badminton
Representing Denmark
European Junior Championships
Bronze medal – third place	2011 Vantaa	Mixed team

Nikolaj Overgaard (born 8 September 1992) is a Danish badminton player.

== Achievements ==
=== BWF International Challenge/Series (2 titles, 2 runners-up) ===
Men's doubles
Year	Tournament	Partner	Opponent	Score	Result
2011	Turkiye Open	(Denmark) Mikkel Mikkelsen	(England) Ben Stawski (Scotland) Paul van Rietvelde	19–21, 13–21	(silver) Runner-up
2012	Portugal International	(Croatia) Zvonimir Đurkinjak	(England) Marcus Ellis (Scotland) Paul van Rietvelde	21–12, 22–20	(gold) Winner
2015	Hungarian International	(Denmark) Søren Gravholt	(Scotland) Martin Campbell (Scotland) Patrick MacHugh	13–21, 21–18, 16–21	(silver) Runner-up
2015	Norwegian International	(Denmark) Søren Gravholt	(Sweden) Richard Eidestedt (Sweden) Andy Hartono Tandaputra	23–21, 21–17	(gold) Winner

BWF International Challenge tournament
BWF International Series tournament
BWF Future Series tournament
