= Norwegian International =

Annual badminton tournament in Norway

The Norwegian International in badminton is an international open held in Norway since 1954. In the first years only the pure man disciplines were played, but since 1959 women's singles, women's doubles and mixed doubles were also played. In 1957, 1962, 1966, 1974, 1979 and 1990 the championships were halted. It is currently one of the tournaments on the European Badminton Circuit.

== Past winners ==
Year	Men's singles	Women's singles	Men's doubles	Women's doubles	Mixed doubles	Ref
1954	(Malaysia) Eddy Choong	no competition	(Malaysia) Eddy Choong (Malaysia) David Choong	no competition		
1955	(Denmark) Finn Kobberø	no competition	(Denmark) Finn Kobberø (Denmark) Jørgen Hammergaard Hansen	no competition		
1956	(Denmark) Finn Kobberø	no competition	(Denmark) Finn Kobberø (Denmark) Jørgen Hammergaard Hansen	no competition		
1957	no competition					
1958	(Denmark) Knud Aage Nielsen	no competition	(Sweden) Bo Nilsson (Sweden) Göran Wahlqvist	no competition		
1959	(Sweden) Bertil Glans	(Denmark) Hanne Andersen	(Sweden) Bertil Glans (Sweden) Berndt Dahlberg	(Denmark) Hanne Andersen (Denmark) Agnete Friis	(Denmark) Leif Jensen (Denmark) Hanne Andersen	
1960	(Thailand) Charoen Wattanasin	(West Germany) Irmgard Latz	(Sweden) Bertil Glans (Sweden) Ingemar Eliasson	no competition	(Norway) Hans Sperre (Norway) Randi Holand	
1961	(Sweden) Leif Ekedahl	(Norway) Randi Holand	(Sweden) Leif Ekedahl (Sweden) Kurt Johnsson	no competition	(Norway) Hans Sperre (Norway) Randi Holand	
1962	no competition					
1963	(Denmark) Tom Bacher	(Denmark) Lizbeth von Barnekow	(Sweden) Bengt-Åke Jönsson (Sweden) Ingemar Eliasson	(Denmark) Lizbeth von Barnekow (Denmark) Liselotte Nielsen	(Denmark) Svend Andersen (Denmark) Liselotte Nielsen	
1964	(Sweden) Kurt Johnsson	(Denmark) Pernille Mølgaard Hansen	(Sweden) Bengt-Åke Jönsson (Sweden) Willy Lund	(Sweden) Eva Twedberg (Sweden) Gunilla Dahlström	(Sweden) Bengt-Åke Jönsson (Sweden) Gunilla Dahlström	
1965	(Sweden) Sture Johnsson	(Sweden) Eva Twedberg	(Denmark) Morten Pommergaard (Denmark) Bendt Rose	(Denmark) Lizbeth von Barnekow (Denmark) Pernille Mølgaard Hansen	(Denmark) Morten Pommergaard (Denmark) Pernille Mølgaard Hansen	
1966	no competition					
1967	(Denmark) Erland Kops	(Sweden) Eva Twedberg	(Denmark) Erland Kops (Denmark) Elo Hansen	(Denmark) Lizbeth von Barnekow (Denmark) Ulla Strand	(Denmark) Elo Hansen (Denmark) Ulla Strand	
1968	(Sweden) Sture Johnsson	(Sweden) Eva Twedberg	(Denmark) Tom Bacher (Denmark) Klaus Kaagaard	(Denmark) Jette Føge (Denmark) Lonny Funch	(Denmark) Klaus Kaagaard (Denmark) Lonny Funch	
1969	(Denmark) Klaus Kaagaard	(Sweden) Eva Twedberg	(Denmark) Jørgen Mortensen (Denmark) Klaus Kaagaard	(Denmark) Jette Føge (Denmark) Karin Jørgensen	(Sweden) Sture Johnsson (Sweden) Eva Twedberg	
1970	(Denmark) Jørgen Mortensen	(Denmark) Lizbeth von Barnekow	(Denmark) Svend Pri (Denmark) Per Walsøe	(Denmark) Anne Flindt (Denmark) Pernille Kaagaard	(Denmark) Svend Pri (Denmark) Ulla Strand	
1971	(Denmark) Svend Pri	(Sweden) Eva Twedberg	(Sweden) Kurt Johnsson (Sweden) Thomas Kihlström	(Denmark) Lene Køppen (Denmark) Pernille Kaagaard	(Sweden) Gert Perneklo (Sweden) Eva Twedberg	
1972	(Sweden) Thomas Kihlström	(Sweden) Eva Twedberg	(Denmark) Klaus Kaagaard (Denmark) Per Walsøe	(Denmark) Anne Flindt (Denmark) Pernille Kaagaard	(Denmark) Per Walsøe (Denmark) Pernille Kaagaard	
1973	(Denmark) Elo Hansen	(Netherlands) Joke van Beusekom	(Sweden) Thomas Kihlström (Sweden) Bengt Fröman	(Denmark) Lene Køppen (Denmark) Pernille Kaagaard	(Scotland) Fraser Gow (Scotland) Christine Stewart	
1974	no competition					
1975	(Denmark) Flemming Delfs	(Denmark) Lene Køppen	(Denmark) Elo Hansen (Denmark) Flemming Delfs	(Denmark) Lene Køppen (Denmark) Inge Borgstrøm	(Denmark) Elo Hansen (Denmark) Inge Borgstrøm	
1976	(Sweden) Sture Johnsson	(Sweden) Anette Börjesson	(Sweden) Bengt Fröman (Sweden) Thomas Kihlström	(Denmark) Inge Borgstrøm (Denmark) Pernille Kaagaard	(Denmark) Elo Hansen (Denmark) Pernille Kaagaard	
1977	(Denmark) Morten Frost	(Denmark) Inge Borgstrøm	(Sweden) Ola Eriksson (Sweden) Christian Lundberg	(Denmark) Pia Nielsen (Denmark) Lonny Bostofte	(Denmark) Mogens Neergaard (Denmark) Inge Borgstrøm	
1978	(Denmark) Steen Fladberg	(Denmark) Lonny Bostofte	(Denmark) Jesper Helledie (Denmark) Steen Fladberg	(Denmark) Susanne Berg (Denmark) Jette Boyer	(Denmark) Steen Fladberg (Denmark) Lonny Bostofte	
1979	no competition					
1980	(Sweden) Thomas Kihlström	(Norway) Else Thoresen	(Sweden) Thomas Kihlström (Sweden) Lars Wengberg	(Denmark) Inge Christensen (Denmark) Susanne Mølgaard Hansen	(Denmark) Kenneth Larsen (Denmark) Dorte Kjær	
1981	(Denmark) Kenneth Larsen	(Denmark) Pia Nielsen	(Sweden) Göran Carlsson (Sweden) Klas-Gunnar Jönsson	(Denmark) Pia Nielsen (Denmark) Kirsten Meier	(Denmark) Mark Christiansen (Denmark) Kirsten Meier	
1982	(Denmark) Kenneth Larsen	(Denmark) Dorte Kjær	(Denmark) Mogens Neergaard (Denmark) Kenneth Larsen	(Denmark) Jane Pedersen (Denmark) Dorte Kjær	(Denmark) Mark Christiansen (Denmark) Jane Pedersen	
1983	(Denmark) Torben Carlsen	(Denmark) Agnethe Juul	(Denmark) Torben Carlsen (Denmark) Kenneth Larsen	(Denmark) Agnethe Juul (Denmark) Gitte Paulsen	(Denmark) Kenneth Larsen (Denmark) Gitte Paulsen	
1984	(Sweden) Ulf Persson	(Denmark) Marian Christiansen	(Sweden) Manfred Mellqvist (Sweden) Bengt Mellqvist	(Denmark) Lotte Olsen (Denmark) Marian Christiansen	(Sweden) Stellan Österberg (Sweden) Catharina Andersson	
1985	(Denmark) Kim Brodersen	(Denmark) Lotte Olsen	(Denmark) Poul-Erik Høyer Larsen (Denmark) Claus Thomsen	(Denmark) Charlotte Madsen (Denmark) Lotte Olsen	(Denmark) Kenneth Larsen (Denmark) Hanne Adsbøl	
1986	(Sweden) Peter Axelsson	(Sweden) Jeanette Kuhl	(Sweden) Peter Axelsson (Sweden) Jens Olsson	(Denmark) Helle Andersen (Denmark) Birgitte Hindse	(Denmark) Jon Holst-Christensen (Denmark) Birgitte Hindse	
1987	(Denmark) Michael Søgaard	(Sweden) Maria Henning	(Sweden) Rikard Ronnblom (Sweden) Erik Soderberg	(Sweden) Catharina Andersson (Sweden) Lillian Johansson	(Sweden) Manfred Mellqvist (Sweden) Lillian Johansson	
1988	(Wales) Chris Rees	(Netherlands) Sonja Mellink	(Netherlands) Uun Santosa (Netherlands) Seno The	(Netherlands) Sonja Mellink (Netherlands) Daniella Oei	(Wales) Chris Rees (Wales) Sarah Doody	
1989	(Denmark) Thomas Stuer-Lauridsen	(Denmark) Camilla Martin	(Norway) Erik Lia (Norway) Hans Sperre Jr.	(Denmark) Camilla Martin (Denmark) Lotte Olsen	(Denmark) Thomas Stuer-Lauridsen (Denmark) Lotte Olsen	
1990	no competition					
1991	(Finland) Tony Tuominen	(Denmark) Helle Andersen	(Sweden) Jan-Eric Antonsson (Sweden) Stellan Österberg	(Denmark) Rikke Broen (Denmark) Marianne Rasmussen	(Sweden) Jan-Eric Antonsson (Sweden) Astrid Crabo	
1992	(England) Steve Butler	(Sweden) Catrine Bengtsson	(Denmark) Martin Lundgaard Hansen (Denmark) Michael Søgaard	(Denmark) Anne Mette Bille (Denmark) Trine Pedersen	(Denmark) Lars Pedersen (Denmark) Anne Mette Bille	
1993	(Sweden) Henrik Bengtsson	(Sweden) Karin Ericsson	(Denmark) Jan Jørgensen (Denmark) Thomas Damgaard	(Sweden) Catrine Bengtsson (Sweden) Kristin Evernas	(Norway) Trond Wåland (Norway) Camilla Silwer	
1994	(Denmark) Peter Rasmussen	(Sweden) Margit Borg	(Denmark) Jesper Larsen (United States) Thomas Reidy	(Sweden) Maria Bengtsson (Sweden) Margit Borg	(Sweden) Robert Larsson (Sweden) Maria Bengtsson	
1995	(Sweden) Rikard Magnusson	(Sweden) Marina Andrievskaya	(Denmark) Jim Laugesen (Denmark) Thomas Stavngaard	(Denmark) Gitte Jansson (Denmark) Mette Schjoldager	(Denmark) Thomas Stavngaard (Denmark) Ann Jørgensen	
1996	(China) Lin Liwen	(Wales) Kelly Morgan	(England) Julian Robertson (England) Nathan Robertson	(Denmark) Pernille Harder (Denmark) Mette Schjoldager	(England) Julian Robertson (England) Gail Emms	
1997	(Sweden) Jens Olsson	(Sweden) Karolina Ericsson	(England) Julian Robertson (England) Nathan Robertson	(Denmark) Christina Sørensen (Denmark) Jane F. Bramsen	(Denmark) Steen Thygesen-Poulsen (Denmark) Jane F. Bramsen	
1998	(Sweden) Henrik Bengtsson	(Sweden) Marina Andrievskaya	(Denmark) Lars Paaske (Denmark) Jesper Mikla	(Sweden) Catrine Bengtsson (Sweden) Marina Andrievskaya	(Denmark) Lars Paaske (Denmark) Jane F. Bramsen	
1999	(South Korea) Shon Seung-mo	(South Korea) Kim Ji-hyun	(South Korea) Kim Yong-hyun (South Korea) Yim Bang-eun	(South Korea) Lee Hyo-jung (South Korea) Yim Kyung-jin	(South Korea) Kim Yong-hyun (South Korea) Yim Kyung-jin	
2000	(Norway) Jim Ronny Andersen	(Finland) Anu Weckström	(Sweden) Peter Axelsson (Sweden) Imanuel Hirschfeld	(Finland) Anu Weckström (Finland) Nina Weckström	(Sweden) Ola Molin (Sweden) Johanna Persson	
2001	(Wales) Irwansyah	(Finland) Anu Weckström	(Denmark) Martin Delfs (Denmark) Jonas Glyager Jensen	(Denmark) Karina Sørensen (Denmark) Julie Houmann	(Denmark) Tommy Sørensen (Denmark) Karina Sørensen	
2002	(Finland) Kasperi Salo	(Denmark) Tine Rasmussen	(Russia) Aleksandr Nikolaenko (Russia) Nikolaj Nikolaenko	(Sweden) Frida Andreasson (Sweden) Lina Uhac	(Sweden) Jörgen Olsson (Sweden) Frida Andreasson	
2003	(Sweden) Per-Henrik Croona	(Denmark) Tine Rasmussen	(South Korea) Lee Jae-jin (South Korea) Hwang Ji-man	(South Korea) Ha Jung-eun (South Korea) Oh Seul-ki	(South Korea) Lee Jae-jin (South Korea) Lee Eun-woo	
2004	(Germany) Björn Joppien	(Germany) Petra Overzier	(Germany) Kristof Hopp (Germany) Ingo Kindervater	(England) Liza Parker (England) Suzanne Rayappan	(Sweden) Fredrik Bergström (Sweden) Johanna Persson	
2005	(Netherlands) Eric Pang	(Germany) Juliane Schenk	(Indonesia) Vidre Wibowo (Indonesia) Imam Sodikin	(Germany) Nicole Grether (Germany) Juliane Schenk	(Germany) Kristof Hopp (Germany) Birgit Overzier	
2006	(Denmark) Hans-Kristian Vittinghus	(Sweden) Sara Persson	(Russia) Anton Nazarenko (Russia) Andrey Ashmarin	(Scotland) Imogen Bankier (Scotland) Emma Mason	(Indonesia) Imam Sodikin (Sweden) Elin Bergblom	
2007	(Germany) Marc Zwiebler	(Germany) Juliane Schenk	(United States) Howard Bach (United States) Bob Malaythong	(Russia) Anastasia Russkikh (Russia) Ekaterina Ananina	(Germany) Kristof Hopp (Germany) Birgit Overzier	
2008	(Finland) Ville Lång	(China) Zhang Xi	(Germany) Michael Fuchs (Germany) Ingo Kindervater	(Russia) Anastasia Russkikh (Russia) Irina Hlebko	(Germany) Michael Fuchs (Germany) Annekatrin Lillie	
2009	(Denmark) Hans-Kristian Vittinghus	(Germany) Juliane Schenk	(Denmark) Rasmus Bonde (Denmark) Simon Mollyhus	(Denmark) Helle Nielsen (Denmark) Marie Røpke	(England) Marcus Ellis (England) Heather Olver	
2010	(Denmark) Hans-Kristian Vittinghus	(Germany) Olga Konon	(Germany) Ingo Kindervater (Germany) Johannes Schoettler	(Netherlands) Lotte Jonathans (Netherlands) Paulien van Dooremalen	(Germany) Michael Fuchs (Germany) Birgit Overzier	
2011	(Finland) Ville Lång	(Bulgaria) Linda Zechiri	(Denmark) Rasmus Bonde (Denmark) Anders Kristiansen	(United States) Eva Lee (United States) Paula Lynn Obanana	(Republic of Ireland) Sam Magee (Republic of Ireland) Chloe Magee	
2012	(Chinese Taipei) Chou Tien-chen	(France) Sashina Vignes Waran	(Netherlands) Ruud Bosch (Netherlands) Koen Ridder	(Netherlands) Samantha Barning (Netherlands) Eefje Muskens	(Netherlands) Jorrit de Ruiter (Netherlands) Samantha Barning	
2013	(Finland) Kasper Lehikoinen	(Denmark) Mia Blichfeldt	(Russia) Nikita Khakimov (Russia) Vasily Kuznetsov	(Denmark) Julie Finne-Ipsen (Denmark) Rikke Soby Hansen	(Russia) Vasily Kuznetsov (Russia) Viktoriia Vorobeva	
2014	(Estonia) Raul Must	(Denmark) Mia Blichfeldt	(Finland) Anton Kaisti (Netherlands) Koen Ridder	(Denmark) Tilde Iversen (Sweden) Emma Wengberg	(Finland) Anton Kaisti (Netherlands) Cheryl Seinen	
2015	(Norway) Marius Myhre	(Denmark) Sofie Holmboe Dahl	(Denmark) Soren Gravholt (Denmark) Nikolaj Overgaard	(Australia) Setyana Mapasa (Australia) Gronya Somerville	(Australia) Sawan Serasinghe (Australia) Setyana Mapasa	
2016	(Finland) Kalle Koljonen	(Malaysia) Yap Rui Chen	(New Zealand) Oliver Leydon-Davis (Denmark) Lasse Moelhede	(Denmark) Julie Finne-Ipsen (Denmark) Rikke Søby	(Finland) Anton Kaisti (Finland) Jenny Nyström	
2017	(Indonesia) Hermansah	(India) Saili Rane	(Denmark) Joel Eipe (Denmark) Philip Seerup	(Denmark) Alexandra Bøje (Denmark) Sara Lundgaard	(England) Gregory Mairs (England) Jenny Moore	
2018	(Denmark) Rasmus Messerschmidt	(South Korea) Sim Yu-jin	(South Korea) Choi Sol-gyu (South Korea) Seo Seung-jae	(Denmark) Gabriella Bøje (Denmark) Marie Louise Steffensen	(Denmark) Joel Eipe (Denmark) Mette Poulsen	
2019	(Chinese Taipei) Lin Yu-hsien	(Chinese Taipei) Sung Shuo-yun	(Chinese Taipei) Lee Fang-chih (Chinese Taipei) Lee Fang-jen	(Sweden) Emma Karlsson (Sweden) Johanna Magnusson	(Denmark) Mads Emil Christensen (Sweden) Emma Karlsson	
2020	Cancelled (Note: This tournament, originally to be played from 5 to 8 November, was later cancelled due to the COVID-19 pandemic in Norway.)					
2021	Cancelled (Note: This tournament, originally to be played from 11 to 14 November, was later cancelled due to the COVID-19 pandemic in Norway.)					
2022	(Chinese Taipei) Lin Chun-yi	(Japan) Natsuki Nidaira	(Chinese Taipei) Chen Zhi-ray (Chinese Taipei) Lu Chen	(Chinese Taipei) Chang Ching-hui (Chinese Taipei) Yang Ching-tun	(France) Lucas Corvée (France) Sharone Bauer	
2023	(Indonesia) Andi Fadel Muhammad	(Canada) Talia Ng	(France) Maël Cattoen (France) Lucas Renoir	(Denmark) Amalie Cecilie Kudsk (Denmark) Signe Schulz	(Poland) Robert Cybulski (Poland) Kornelia Marczak	
2024	(Chinese Taipei) Chen Chi-ting	(Chinese Taipei) Wang Yu-si	(France) Maël Cattoen (France) Lucas Renoir	(Poland) Paulina Hankiewicz (Poland) Kornelia Marczak	(Denmark) Otto Reiler (Denmark) Amanda Aarrebo Petersen	
2025	(Chinese Taipei) Chiang Tzu-chieh	(Chinese Taipei) Liao Jui-chi	(Chinese Taipei) Chen Hung-ming (Chinese Taipei) Tsai Cheng Han	(Sweden) Malena Norrman (Sweden) Tilda Sjöö	(Sweden) Filip Karlborg (Sweden) Tilda Sjöö	
2026	(Denmark) Mathias Solgaard	(Denmark) Laura Fløj Thomsen	(Denmark) Mikkel Eilersen Bouet (Denmark) Oliver Geisler	(Denmark) Maria Søgård Andersen (Denmark) Rebecca Thorup	(Finland) Ananda Galvani Daniswara (Estonia) Elisaveta Berik	

== Performances by nation ==
As of the 2026 edition

Rank	Nation	MS	WS	MD	WD	XD	Total
1	Denmark	24	21	24	35.5	25.5	130
2	Sweden	15	15	17	8.5	12	67.5
3	Germany	2	6	3	1	4	16
4	Chinese Taipei	5	3	3	1		12
5	Finland	6	2	0.5	1	2	11.5
6	Netherlands	1	2	2.5	3	1.5	10
6	South Korea	1	2	3	2	2	10
8	Norway*	2	2	1		3	8
9	England	1		2	1	3	7
10	Russia			3	2	1	6
11	France		1	2		1	4
11	Wales	2	1			1	4
13	Indonesia	2		1		0.5	3.5
14	Malaysia	1	1	1			3
15	United States			1.5	1		2.5
16	Australia				1	1	2
16	China	1	1				2
16	Poland				1	1	2
16	Scotland				1	1	2
20	Estonia	1				0.5	1.5
21	Bulgaria		1				1
21	Canada		1				1
21	India		1				1
21	Ireland					1	1
21	Japan		1				1
21	Thailand	1					1
27	New Zealand			0.5			0.5
Total		65	61	65	59	61	311

* Host nation
