= Steffi Annys =

Belgian badminton player (born 1988)

Personal information
- Born: 10 May 1988 (age 38) De Panne, Belgium
- Height: 1.63 m (5 ft 4 in)
- Weight: 60 kg (132 lb)

Sport
- Country: Belgium
- Sport: Badminton
- Handedness: Right
- Coached by: Alan McIlvain

Women's & mixed doubles
- Highest ranking: 51 (WD 11 July 2013); 77 (XD 21 April 2011)
- BWF profile

Steffi Annys (born 10 May 1988) is a Belgian badminton player. She competed at the 2015 European Games.

== Achievements ==
=== BWF International Challenge/Series ===
Women's doubles
Year	Tournament	Partner	Opponent	Score	Result
2010	Portugal International	(Belgium) Severine Corvilain	(England) Alex Langley (England) Lauren Smith	21–13, 13–21, 18–21	(silver) Runner-up
2015	Hellas International	(Belgium) Flore Vandenhoucke	(Finland) Mathilda Lindholm (Finland) Jenny Nyström	21–17, 21–12	(gold) Winner

BWF International Challenge tournament
BWF International Series tournament
BWF Future Series tournament
