= Flore Vandenhoucke =

Belgian badminton player (born 1995)

Personal information
- Born: 15 March 1995 (age 31) Ronse, Belgium
- Height: 1.63 m (5 ft 4 in)
- Weight: 72 kg (159 lb)

Sport
- Country: Belgium
- Sport: Badminton
- Coached by: Alan McIlvain

Women's singles & doubles
- Highest ranking: 141 (WS 6 October 2016); 57 (WD 19 February 2019); 128 (XD 30 April 2015)
- BWF profile

Flore Vandenhoucke (born 15 March 1995) is a Belgian badminton player. She competed at the 2015 and 2019 European Games.

== Achievements ==
=== BWF International Challenge/Series ===
Women's doubles
Year	Tournament	Partner	Opponent	Score	Result
2015	Hellas International	(Belgium) Steffi Annys	(Finland) Mathilda Lindholm (Finland) Jenny Nyström	21–17, 21–12	(gold) Winner
2017	Bulgarian International	(Belgium) Lise Jaques	(Germany) Theresea Isenberg (Germany) Brid Stepper	21–10, 21–10	(gold) Winner
2017	Welsh International	(Belgium) Lise Jaques	(Poland) Kornelia Marczak (Poland) Magdalena Witek	21–10, 21–15	(gold) Winner
2019	German International	(Belgium) Lise Jaques	(Germany) Leona Michalski (Germany) Thuc Phuong Nguyen	22–20, 21–14	(gold) Winner

Mixed doubles
Year	Tournament	Partner	Opponent	Score	Result
2014	Riga International	(Belgium) Nick Marcoen	(Estonia) Kristjan Kaljurand (Estonia) Laura Tomband	9–21, 21–10, 12–21	(silver) Runner-up

BWF International Challenge tournament
BWF International Series tournament
BWF Future Series tournament
