= Ville Lång =

Finnish badminton player

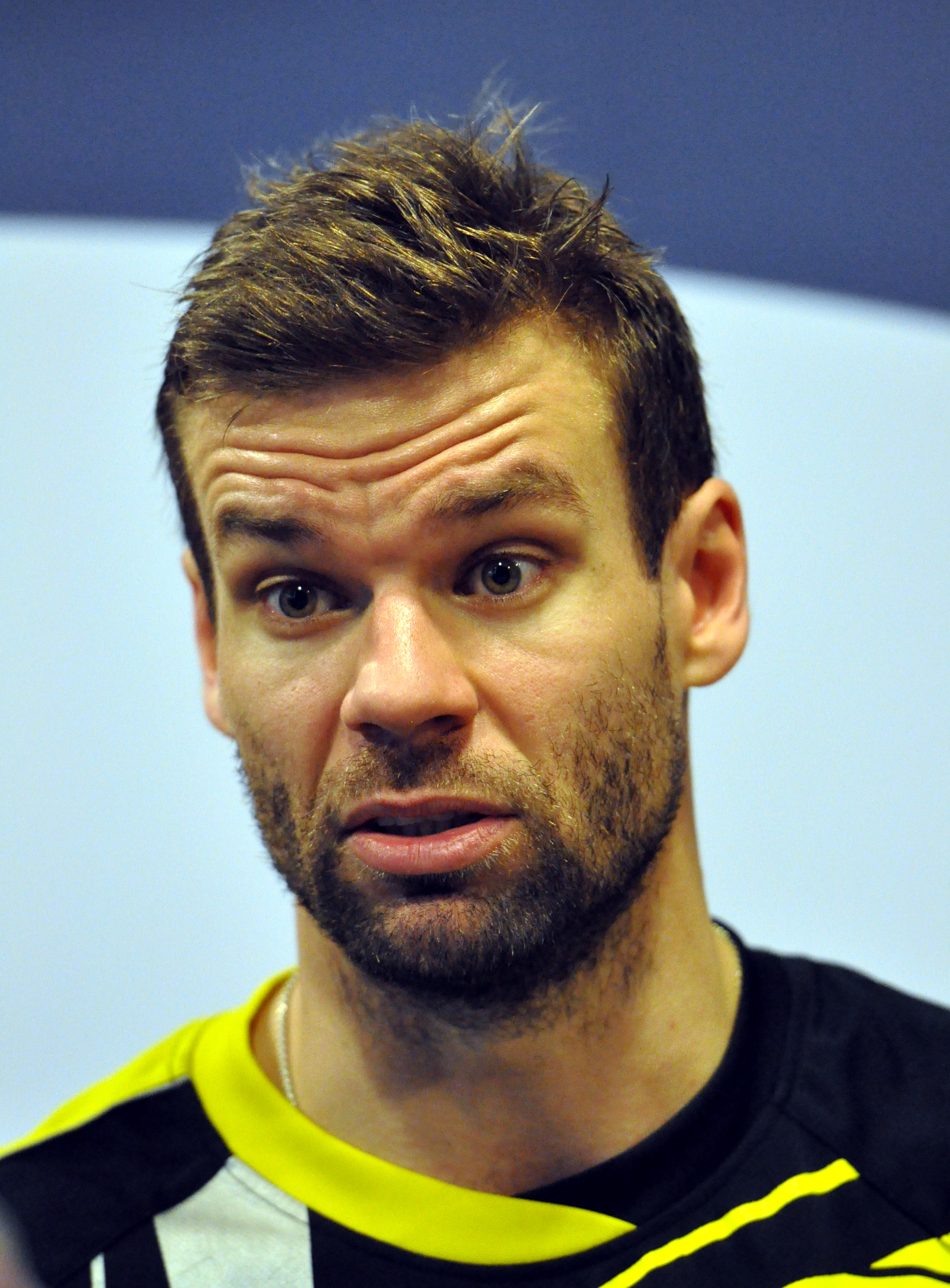

Personal information
- Born: 14 February 1985 (age 41) Lahti, Finland
- Height: 1.78 m (5 ft 10 in)

Sport
- Country: Finland
- Sport: Badminton
- Handedness: Right
- Retired: 31 January 2016

Men's singles
- Highest ranking: 21 (March 2009)
- BWF profile
Medal record
Men's badminton
Representing Finland
European Men's Team Championships
| Bronze medal – third place | 2014 Basel | Men's team |
European Junior Championships
| Bronze medal – third place | 2003 Esbjerg | Men's singles |

Ville Lång (born 14 February 1985) is a badminton player from Finland. He won ten consecutive Finland's National Championship men's singles titles in 2005–2014, and 3 men's doubles title in 2010, 2011, and 2017. In 2003, he won bronze at the European Junior Championships. Lång competed at the 2008 and 2012 Summer Olympics. He announced his retirement on 31 January 2016, and received a meritorious service award from BWF. After retiring from the international competition, Lång started his coaching career first in Paris where he coached the league team Aulnay-sous-Bois after which he has been the head coach of one local club in Sweden. In 2019, he was elected as vice chairman of the BWF Athletes' Commission to represent the needs and views of athletes to the BWF council and committees.

== Achievements ==
=== European Junior Championships ===
Boys' singles
| Year | Venue | Opponent | Score | Result |
|---|---|---|---|---|
| 2003 | Esbjerg Badminton Center; Esbjerg, Denmark | (Germany) Marc Zwiebler | 8–15, 6–15 | Bronze |

=== BWF Grand Prix (1 title) ===
The BWF Grand Prix had two levels, the BWF Grand Prix and Grand Prix Gold. It was a series of badminton tournaments sanctioned by the Badminton World Federation (BWF) was held from 2007 to 2017.

Men's singles
| Year | Tournament | Opponent | Score | Result |
|---|---|---|---|---|
| 2014 | Scottish Open | (Chinese Taipei) Wang Tzu-wei | 17–21, 22–20, 21–16 | (gold) Winner |

BWF Grand Prix Gold tournament
BWF Grand Prix tournament

=== BWF International Challenge/Series (14 titles, 11 runner-ups) ===
Men's singles
| Year | Tournament | Opponent | Score | Result |
|---|---|---|---|---|
| 2005 | Slovak International | (Poland) Przemysław Wacha | 15–12, 9–15, 9–15 | (silver) Runner-up |
| 2006 | Le Volant d'Or de Toulouse | (Czech Republic) Petr Koukal | 21–18, 21–15 | (gold) Winner |
| 2006 | Scottish International | (Wales) Zhu Min | 21–16, 14–21, 21–17 | (gold) Winner |
| 2007 | Hungarian International | (Denmark) Jan Ø. Jørgensen | 6–21, 5–21 | (silver) Runner-up |
| 2008 | Croatian International | (France) Erwin Kehlhoffner | 21–17, 21–6 | (gold) Winner |
| 2008 | Banuinvest International | (Estonia) Raul Must | 21–17, 21–18 | (gold) Winner |
| 2008 | Polish International | (Germany) Marc Zwiebler | 15–21, 13–21 | (silver) Runner-up |
| 2008 | European Circuit Finals | (Germany) Marc Zwiebler | 14–21, 21–19, 19–21 | (silver) Runner-up |
| 2008 | White Nights | (Czech Republic) Jan Vondra | 21–15, 21–8 | (gold) Winner |
| 2008 | Norwegian International | (Sweden) Henri Hurskainen | 21–13, 21–8 | (gold) Winner |
| 2009 | Estonian International | (Denmark) Kasper Ipsen | 21–14, 21–19 | (gold) Winner |
| 2009 | Turkey International | (Sweden) Henri Hurskainen | 21–14, 21–23, 21–19 | (gold) Winner |
| 2010 | Finnish International | (Estonia) Raul Must | 11–21, 10–21 | (silver) Runner-up |
| 2010 | Hungarian International | (Belgium) Yuhan Tan | 22–20, 21–16 | (gold) Winner |
| 2010 | Scottish International | (India) Anand Pawar | 9–21, 10–21 | (silver) Runner-up |
| 2011 | Estonian International | (Estonia) Raul Must | 21–15, 21–14 | (gold) Winner |
| 2011 | Dutch International | (Denmark) Hans-Kristian Vittinghus | 21–18, 15–21, 4–21 | (silver) Runner-up |
| 2011 | Norwegian International | (Denmark) Emil Holst | 19–21, 21–11, 21–10 | (gold) Winner |
| 2011 | Italian International | (Spain) Pablo Abián | 21–13, 14–21, 13–21 | (silver) Runner-up |
| 2012 | Estonian International | (Estonia) Raul Must | 21–8, 21–15 | (gold) Winner |
| 2013 | Denmark International | (Denmark) Viktor Axelsen | 17–21, 8–21 | (silver) Runner-up |
| 2013 | White Nights | (Finland) Eetu Heino | 14–21, 21–17, 9–21 | (silver) Runner-up |
| 2014 | Swedish Masters | (Sweden) Henri Hurskainen | 16–21, 21–14, 21–19 | (gold) Winner |
| 2015 | Swiss International | (Malaysia) Iskandar Zulkarnain Zainuddin | 19–21, 21–16, 11–21 | (silver) Runner-up |
| 2016 | Estonian International | (France) Lucas Claerbout | 21–17, 21–19 | (gold) Winner |

BWF International Challenge tournament
BWF International Series tournament
BWF Future Series tournament
