= Anu Nieminen =

Finnish badminton player

Personal information
- Born: Anu Kristiina Weckström; 16 December 1977 (age 48) Helsinki, Finland
- Height: 1.70 m (5 ft 7 in)
- Weight: 61 kg (134 lb)

Sport
- Country: Finland
- Sport: Badminton
- Handedness: Right

Women's singles
- Highest ranking: 37 (21 January 2010)
- BWF profile

Anu Kristiina Nieminen (born 16 December 1977; née Weckström) is a Finnish badminton player. Born in Helsinki, Nieminen joined the national team in 1994. She is one of the best badminton players in Finland, having won twelve National Championships, and competed in four consecutive Summer Olympics.

Nieminen first represented Finland at the Olympic level at the 2000 Summer Olympics in Sydney. She reached the second round before losing to Kanako Yonekura of Japan. In the 2004 Olympics, she was defeated by Kaori Mori of Japan in the Round of 32. In 2006, she signed with the Finnish cosmetics company Lumene, along with her husband, professional tennis player Jarkko Nieminen.

Nieminen competed at the 2008 Olympics, she again reached the second round, this time losing to Huaiwen Xu of Germany. In the 2012 Olympics, she won her first match against Victoria Montero of Mexico, but after losing to Tai Tzu-ying of Chinese Taipei, she did not advance beyond the group stages. In 2013, she joined the Lillerød Badminton in Denmark as a coach for the young players.

== Personal life ==
Anu Weckström began dating professional tennis player Jarkko Nieminen in the summer of 2003, and got engaged in December of that same year. The couple married in June 2005 at the Temppeliaukio Church in Helsinki.

== Achievements ==
=== BWF International Challenge/Series ===
Women's singles
Year	Tournament	Opponent	Score	Result
2011	Slovak Open	(Netherlands) Patty Stolzenbach	21–14, 19–21, 21–16	(gold) Winner
2008	Austrian International	(China) Zhang Xi	21–19, 13–21, 9–21	(silver) Runner-up
2005	Italian International	(Denmark) Tine Rasmussen	4–11, 5–11	(silver) Runner-up
2003	Dominican Republic International	(Japan) Miyo Akao	5–11, 11–7, 11–13	(silver) Runner-up
2002	Slovenian International	(Bulgaria) Petya Nedelcheva	11–6, 1–11, 9–11	(silver) Runner-up
2002	Finnish International	(Bulgaria) Petya Nedelcheva	7–1, 7–4, 7–0	(gold) Winner
2001	Irish International	(Canada) Kara Solmundson	3–7, 7–1, 2–7, 5–7	(silver) Runner-up
2001	Norwegian International	(France) Tatiana Vattier	7–0, 7–1, 7–4	(gold) Winner
2001	Portugal International	(France) Pi Hongyan	8–11, 1–11	(silver) Runner-up
2000	Scottish International	(Denmark) Christina Sørensen	11–4, 3–11, 11–4	(gold) Winner
2000	Norwegian International	(Sweden) Katja Wengberg	11–7, 11–6	(gold) Winner
2000	Croatian International	(Czech Republic) Markéta Koudelková	11–6, 11–4	(gold) Winner
2000	Dutch International	(Netherlands) Lonneke Janssen	3–11, 3–11	(silver) Runner-up
2000	Cuba International	(Japan) Takako Ida	2–11, 4–11	(silver) Runner-up
1999	Irish International	(Japan) Miho Tanaka	9–11, 5–11	(silver) Runner-up
1999	Guatemala International	(Canada) Denyse Julien	6–11, 10–13	(silver) Runner-up
1999	Argentina International	(Canada) Kara Solmundson	6–11, 6–11	(silver) Runner-up
1999	Brazil International	(Canada) Kara Solmundson	13–10, 11–9	(gold) Winner
1999	Bulgarian International	(Ukraine) Elena Nozdran	6–11, 8–11	(silver) Runner-up
1998	Scottish International	(Sweden) Margit Borg	5–11, 3–11	(silver) Runner-up
1998	Austrian International	(Netherlands) Carolien Glebbeek	3–11, 12–9, 8–11	(silver) Runner-up

Women's doubles
Year	Tournament	Partner	Opponent	Score	Result
2000	Norwegian International	(Finland) Nina Weckström	(Sweden) Caroline Eriksson (Sweden) Johanna Persson	10–15, 15–10, 15–7	(gold) Winner

Commonwealth Youth Games tournament
BWF International Series tournament
