= Mathilda Lindholm =

Finnish badminton player (born 1995)

Personal information
- Born: 17 July 1995 (age 31) Stockholm, Sweden
- Height: 1.78 m (5 ft 10 in)
- Weight: 68 kg (150 lb)

Sport
- Country: Finland
- Sport: Badminton
- Handedness: Right
- Coached by: Veli-Markus Melleri

Women's & mixed doubles
- Highest ranking: 66 (WD 17 November 2016); 157 (XD 5 May 2016)
- BWF profile

Mathilda Lindholm (born 17 July 1995) is a Finnish badminton player, specializing in doubles play. She started playing badminton at 5 years old, then in 2005, she joined Finnish national badminton team.

In 2011, she won gold medal at the European U17 Badminton Championships in mixed doubles event with Iikka Heino. She also finished as runner-up in senior level at the 2010 Finnish Open and 2015 Hellas International in women's doubles event with Jenny Nyström. She participated at the 2015 European Games in Baku, Azerbaijan.

== Achievements ==
=== BWF International Challenge/Series ===
Women's doubles
Year	Tournament	Partner	Opponent	Score	Result
2010	Finnish Open	(Finland) Jenny Nyström	(France) Barbara Matias (France) Élisa Chanteur	12–21, 11–21	(silver) Runner-up
2015	Hellas International	(Finland) Jenny Nyström	(Belgium) Steffi Annys (Belgium) Flore Vandenhoucke	17–21, 12–21	(silver) Runner-up

Commonwealth Youth Games tournament
BWF International Series tournament
BWF Future Series tournament
