= Kaj Österberg =

Finnish footballer (born 1942)

Personal information
- Date of birth: 8 December 1942 (age 83)

International career
Years	Team	Apps	(Gls)
1964	Finland	4	(0)

Managerial career
- 1979–1989: Finland women

Kaj Österberg (born 8 December 1942) is a Finnish footballer. He played in four matches for the Finland national football team in 1964.
