= Søren Gravholt =

Danish badminton player (born 1990)

Personal information
- Born: 29 June 1990 (age 36)

Sport
- Country: Denmark
- Sport: Badminton

Men's singles & doubles
- Highest ranking: 195 (MS 12 May 2011); 70 (MD 3 December 2015); 69 (XD 29 September 2016)
- BWF profile
Medal record
Men's badminton
Representing Denmark
European Junior Championships
Gold medal – first place	2009 Milan	Mixed team

Søren Gravholt (born 29 June 1990) is a Danish badminton player and physiotherapist at Nykøbing Falster Håndboldklub.

== Achievements ==
=== BWF Grand Prix ===
The BWF Grand Prix had two levels, the Grand Prix and Grand Prix Gold. It was a series of badminton tournaments sanctioned by the Badminton World Federation (BWF) and played between 2007 and 2017.

Mixed doubles
Year	Tournament	Partner	Opponent	Score	Result
2016	Dutch Open	(Denmark) Maiken Fruergaard	(Denmark) Mathias Christiansen (Denmark) Sara Thygesen	18–21, 22–20, 16–21	(silver) Runner-up

BWF Grand Prix Gold tournament
BWF Grand Prix tournament

=== BWF International Challenge/Series ===
Men's doubles
Year	Tournament	Partner	Opponent	Score	Result
2009	Slovak Open	(Denmark) Christian Westergaard Nielsen	(Czech Republic) Ondřej Kopřiva (Czech Republic) Tomáš Kopřiva	18–21, 12–21	(silver) Runner-up
2015	Hungarian International	(Denmark) Nikolaj Overgaard	(Scotland) Martin Campbell (Scotland) Patrick MacHugh	13–21, 21–18, 16–21	(silver) Runner-up
2015	Norwegian International	(Denmark) Nikolaj Overgaard	(Sweden) Richard Eidestedt (Sweden) Andy Hartono Tandaputra	23–21, 21–17	(gold) Winner

Mixed doubles
Year	Tournament	Partner	Opponent	Score	Result
2015	Norwegian International	(Denmark) Maiken Fruergaard	(Australia) Sawan Serasinghe (Australia) Setyana Mapasa	17–21, 15–21	(silver) Runner-up
2017	Hungarian International	(Sweden) Louise Eriksson	(Russia) Rodion Alimov (Russia) Alina Davletova	23–25, 16–21	(silver) Runner-up

BWF International Challenge tournament
BWF International Series tournament
BWF Future Series tournament
