= Mika Köngäs =

Finnish badminton player (born 1993)

Personal information
- Born: 27 April 1993 (age 33)

Sport
- Country: Finland
- Sport: Badminton

Men's singles & doubles
- Highest ranking: 340 (MS 3 December 2015); 187 (MD 17 December 2015); 342 (XD 17 May 2012)
- BWF profile
Medal record
Men's badminton
Representing Finland
European Men's Team Championships
Bronze medal – third place	2014 Basel	Men's team

Mika Köngäs (born 27 April 1993) is a Finnish badminton player. He won a bronze medal at the 2014 European Men's Team Championships.
