= Nanna Vainio =

Finnish badminton player (born 1991)

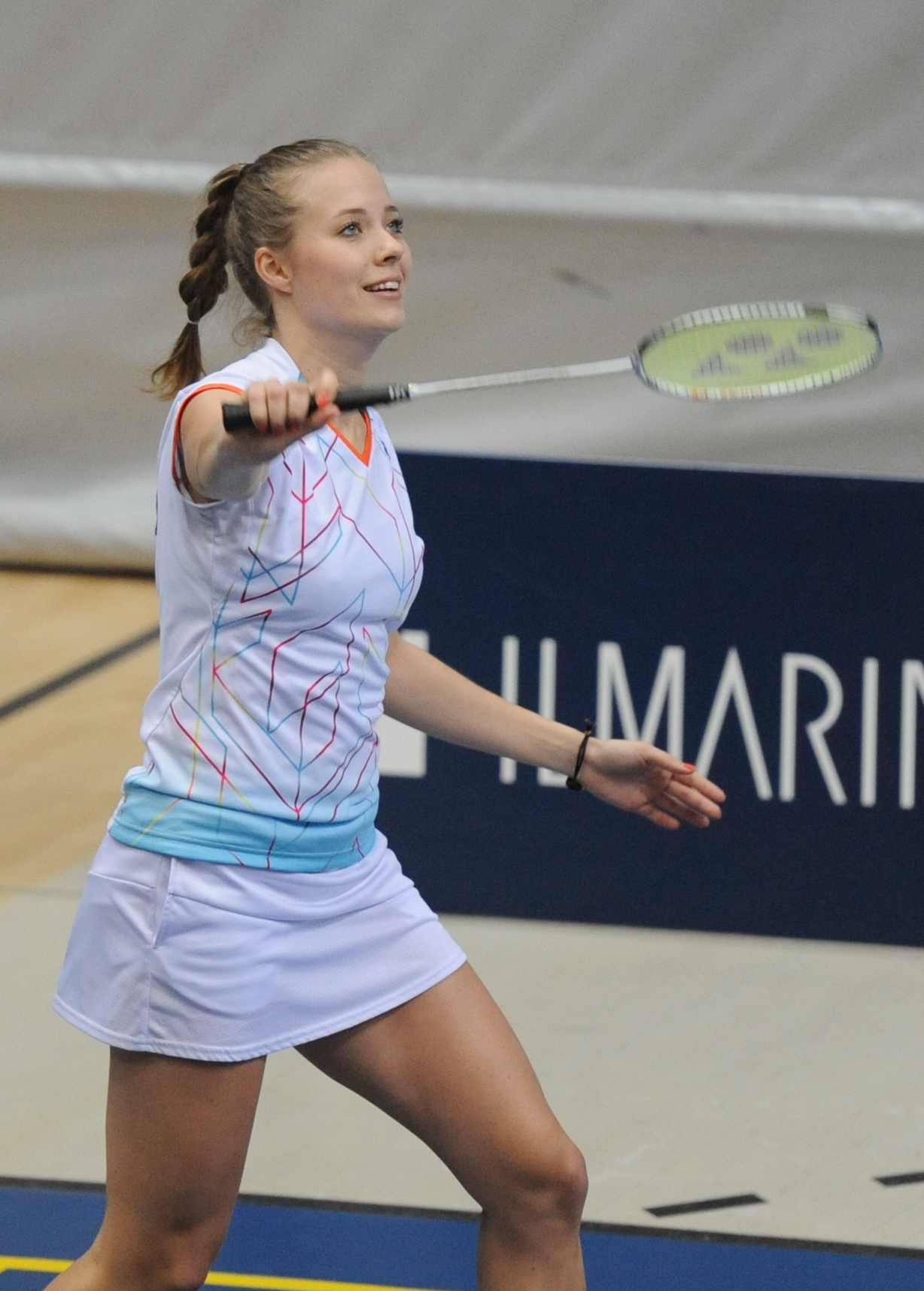

Personal information
- Born: 2 May 1991 (age 35) Ekenäs, Finland
- Height: 1.74 m (5 ft 8 1/2 in)

Sport
- Country: Finland
- Sport: Badminton
- Handedness: Right

Women's singles
- Career record: 109 wins, 124 losses
- Highest ranking: 56 (3 November 2016)

Nanna Vainio (born 29 May 1991) is a right handed Finnish badminton player who lives in Espoo in Finland. Since 2009 she has been the Finnish singles champion several times.

== Career ==
Vainio was born on Ekenäs in 1991. She first competed internationally in Latvia when she was 14 and she has been in the national team since 2008. She graduated from high school in Espoo Mattlidens gymnasium in 2010, after which she studied for a degree in information management and business administration at Loughborough University in England. In 2013, she moved to Copenhagen, where she studied for a master's degree and was trained by Anu Nieminen at the Copenhagen Badminton Center. She graduated in 2015 and has since been training again in Finland.

Vainio has been ranked as 56th in the world and she represented her country at the 2016 Summer Olympics. She lost in the first round of the tournament to the Spanish player Carolina Marín who has been ranked number one in the world.

== Achievements ==
=== BWF International Challenge/Series ===
Women's singles
| Year | Tournament | Opponent | Score | Result |
|---|---|---|---|---|
| 2011 | Slovenian International | (Germany) Carola Bott | 13–21, 10–21 | (silver) Runner-up |
| 2015 | Iceland International | (Denmark) Mette Poulsen | 11–21, 9–21 | (silver) Runner-up |
| 2015 | Mauritius International | (Finland) Airi Mikkelä | 21–16, 21–11 | (gold) Winner |
| 2015 | Morocco International | (Belgium) Lianne Tan | 21–15, 22–24, 8–21 | (silver) Runner-up |
| 2016 | Iceland International | (Denmark) Julie Dawal Jakobsen | 17–21, 6–21 | (silver) Runner-up |
| 2016 | Peru International | (Finland) Airi Mikkelä | 13–21, 17–21 | (silver) Runner-up |

BWF International Challenge tournament
BWF International Series tournament
BWF Future Series tournament
