= Kim Bruun =

Danish badminton player (born 1993)

Personal information
- Born: Kim Jung Bruun; 21 August 1993 (age 33) Seoul, South Korea
- Height: 1.81 m (5 ft 11 in)

Sport
- Country: Denmark
- Sport: Badminton
- Handedness: Right

Men's singles
- Highest ranking: 53 (22 June 2017)
- BWF profile
Medal record
Men's badminton
Representing Denmark
European Junior Championships
Bronze medal – third place	2011 Vantaa	Mixed team

Kim Jung Bruun (born 21 August 1993) is a Danish badminton player.

== Personal life ==
Bruun is of Korean descent but does not speak the language. He was adopted by a Danish family when he was just three months old, and grew up in Copenhagen.

== Achievements ==
=== BWF International Challenge/Series (8 titles, 3 runners-up) ===
Men's singles
Year	Tournament	Opponent	Score	Result
2010	Iceland International	(Denmark) Jacob Damgaard Eriksen	14–21, 21–16, 21–19	(gold) Winner
2012	Czech International	(Denmark) Joachim Persson	11–21, 10–21	(silver) Runner-up
2014	Hellas International	(Poland) Michał Rogalski	21–16, 21–13	(gold) Winner
2016	Iceland International	(Portugal) Pedro Martins	10–21, 21–14, 21–16	(gold) Winner
2016	Hellas Open	(Sweden) Gabriel Ulldahl	12–21, 21–19, 22–20	(gold) Winner
2016	Hellas International	(Bulgaria) Ivan Rusev	21–6, 16–21, 19–21	(silver) Runner-up
2016	Hungarian International	(Denmark) Victor Svendsen	12–10, 11–6, 11–6	(gold) Winner
2017	Hellas International	(Bulgaria) Ivan Rusev	21–9, 21–18	(gold) Winner
2017	Hellas Open	(Finland) Henri Aarnio	21–12, 21–15	(gold) Winner
2019	Slovak Open	(Bulgaria) Ivan Rusev	21–18, 21–11	(gold) Winner
2022	Belgian International	(Chinese Taipei) Lin Chun-yi	14–21, 13–21	(silver) Runner-up

BWF International Challenge tournament
BWF International Series tournament
BWF Future Series tournament
