= Henri Aarnio =

Finnish badminton player (born 1993)

Personal information
- Born: 9 July 1993 (age 33) Vantaa, Finland

Sport
- Country: Finland
- Sport: Badminton
- Handedness: Right

Men's singles & doubles
- Highest ranking: 98 (MS 20 September 2018); 74 (MD with Iikka Heino 7 September 2017); 96 (XD with Jenny Nyström 12 May 2016)
- BWF profile
Medal record
Men's badminton
Representing Finland
European Men's Team Championships
Bronze medal – third place	2014 Basel	Men's team

Henri Aarnio (born 9 July 1993) is a Finnish badminton player. He started playing badminton at 9 years old, then at age 19, he won the Finnish International Junior Championships in boys' singles. In 2015, he was the runner-up at the Slovak Open in the men's singles event and in 2016, he became the runner-up of the Hellas Open in the mixed doubles event with Jenny Nyström. In 2017, he became the runner-up at the Estonian International tournament in the men's doubles event partnered with Iikka Heino.

== Achievements ==
=== BWF International Challenge/Series (5 runners-up) ===
Men's singles
Year	Tournament	Opponent	Score	Result
2015	Slovak Open	(England) Alex Lane	15–21, 9–21	(silver) Runner-up
2017	Hellas Open	(Denmark) Kim Bruun	12–21, 15–21	(silver) Runner-up

Men's doubles
Year	Tournament	Partner	Opponent	Score	Result
2017	Estonian International	(Finland) Iikka Heino	(France) Bastian Kersaudy (France) Julien Maio	13–21, 14–21	(silver) Runner-up
2017	Hellas Open	(Finland) Iikka Heino	(Denmark) Kasper Antonsen (Denmark) Niclas Nøhr	17–21, 12–21	(silver) Runner-up

Mixed doubles
Year	Tournament	Partner	Opponent	Score	Result
2016	Hellas Open	(Finland) Jenny Nyström	(Poland) Paweł Pietryja (Poland) Aneta Wojtkowska	17–21, 17–21	(silver) Runner-up

BWF International Challenge tournament
BWF International Series tournament
BWF Future Series tournament
