= Sonja Pekkola =

Finnish badminton player (born 1993)

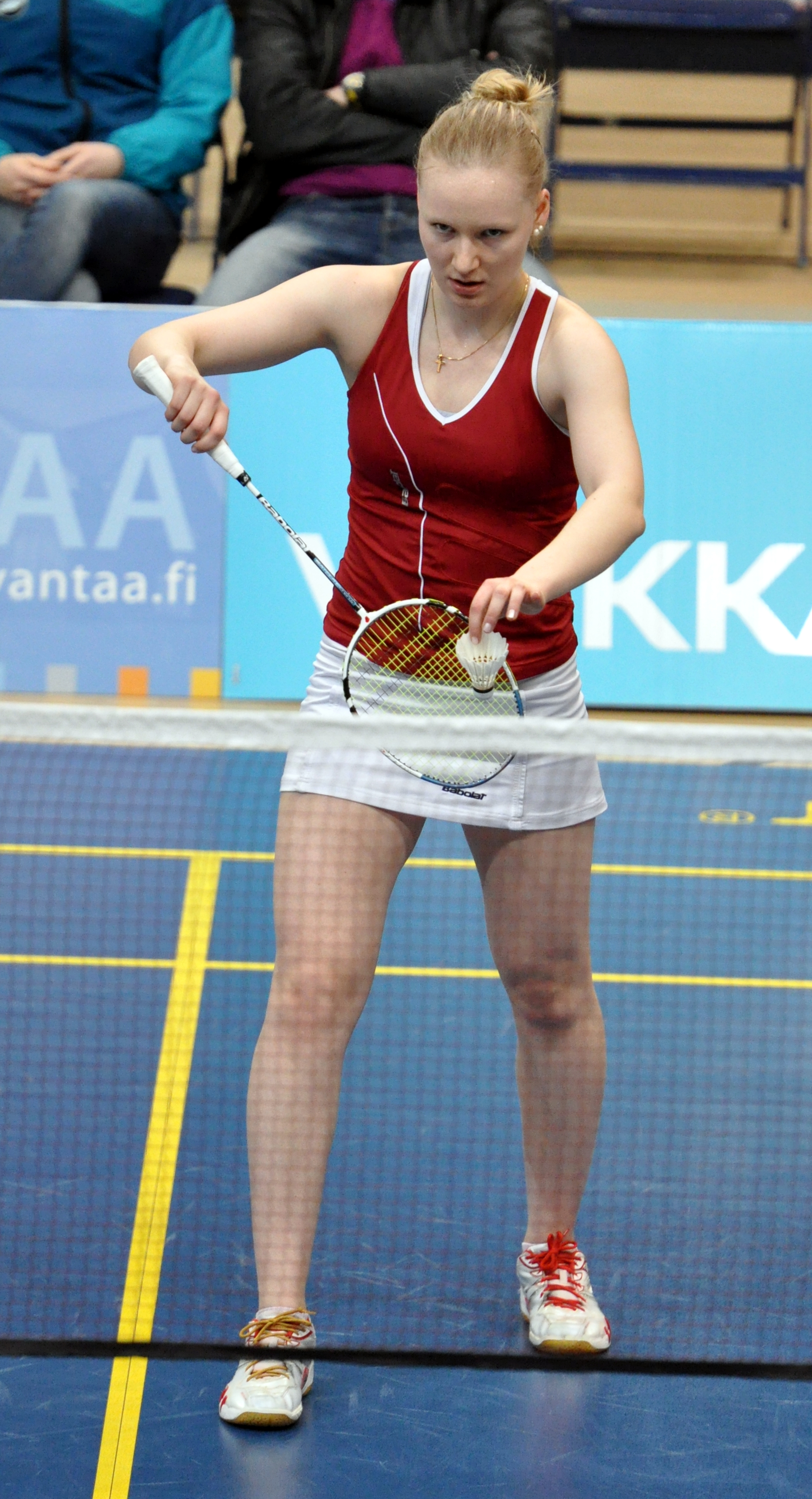

Personal information
- Born: 23 May 1993 (age 33) Espoo, Finland
- Height: 1.71 m (5 ft 7 in)

Sport
- Country: Finland
- Sport: Badminton
- Handedness: Right

Women's singles & doubles
- Highest ranking: 178 (WS 29 October 2015); 65 (WD with Jenny Nyström 4 May 2017); 178 (XD with Oskari Larkimo 14 January 2020)
- BWF profile

Sonja Pekkola (born 23 May 1993) is a Finnish badminton player. She started playing badminton since 10 years old at her hometown, then in 2012 she joined Finnish national badminton team. She won Finnish National Championships women's singles title in 2013, and six consecutive women's doubles title from 2014 to 2019. She won the international title at the 2016 Hellas Open in the women's doubles with Jenny Nyström.

== BWF International Challenge/Series (1 title) ==
Women's doubles
Year	Tournament	Partner	Opponent	Score	Result
2016	Hellas Open	(Finland) Jenny Nyström	(Germany) Barbara Bellenberg (Germany) Eva Janssens	21–17, 21–16	(gold) Winner

BWF International Challenge tournament
BWF International Series tournament
BWF Future Series tournament
