= Jenny Vähäsarja =

Finnish badminton player

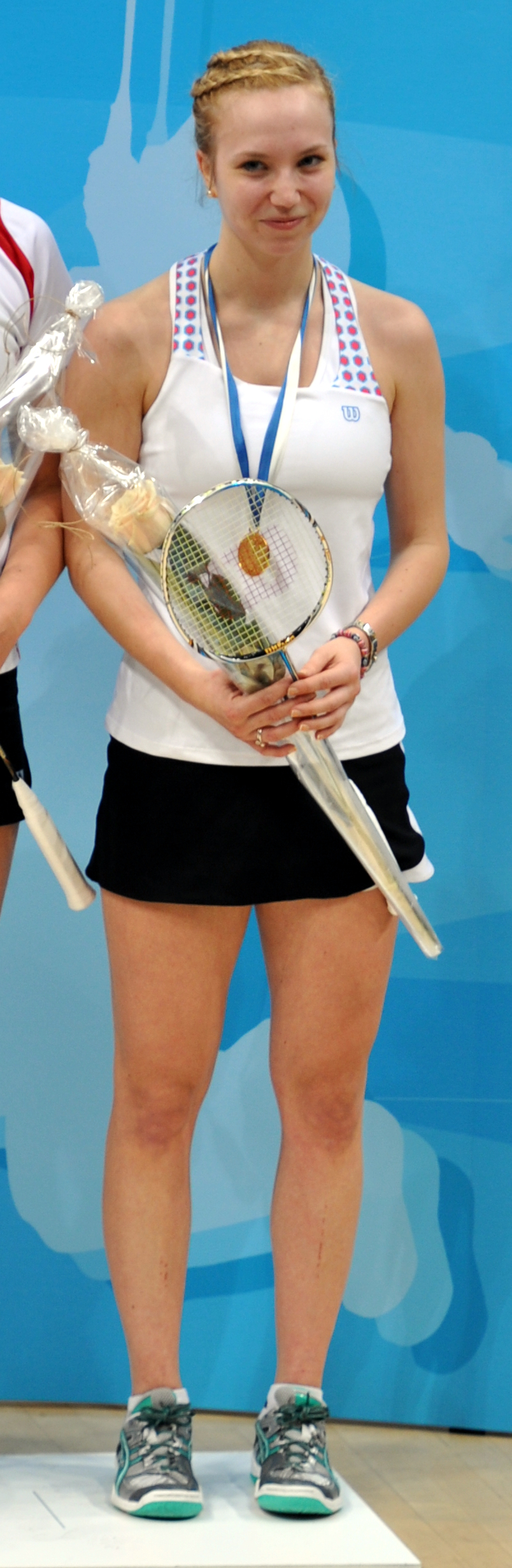

Personal information
- Born: Jenny Nyström; 2 February 1994 (age 32) Helsinki, Finland
- Height: 1.68 m (5 ft 6 in)
- Weight: 57 kg (126 lb)

Sport
- Country: Finland
- Sport: Badminton
- Handedness: Right

Women's & mixed doubles
- Highest ranking: 65 (WD with Sonja Pekkola 4 May 2017); 43 (XD with Anton Kaisti 16 November 2017)
- BWF profile

Jenny Vähäsarja (née Nyström; born 2 February 1994) is a Finnish badminton player, specializing in doubles play. She started playing badminton at 6 years old, then in 2009, she joined the national team.

In 2013, she won the Estonian International and Irish International tournaments in mixed doubles event with her partner Anton Kaisti. In 2015, she became the runner-up of Hellas International in women's doubles event with Mathilda Lindholm. In 2016, she won Hellas Open in the women's doubles and runner-up in the mixed doubles.

Vähäsarja is a Swedish-speaking Finn.

== Achievements ==
=== BWF International Challenge/Series (7 titles, 5 runners-up) ===
Women's doubles
| Year | Tournament | Partner | Opponent | Score | Result |
|---|---|---|---|---|---|
| 2010 | Finnish Open | (Finland) Mathilda Lindholm | (France) Barbara Matias (France) Élisa Chanteur | 12–21, 11–21 | (silver) Runner-up |
| 2011 | Slovenian International | (Finland) Airi Mikkelä | (Germany) Johanna Goliszewski (Germany) Carla Nelte | 14–21, 18–21 | (silver) Runner-up |
| 2015 | Hellas International | (Finland) Mathilda Lindholm | (Belgium) Steffi Annys (Belgium) Flore Vandenhoucke | 17–21, 12–21 | (silver) Runner-up |
| 2016 | Hellas Open | (Finland) Sonja Pekkola | (Germany) Barbara Bellenberg (Germany) Eva Janssens | 21–17, 21–16 | (gold) Winner |

Mixed doubles
| Year | Tournament | Partner | Opponent | Score | Result |
|---|---|---|---|---|---|
| 2013 | Estonian International | (Finland) Anton Kaisti | (France) Bastian Kersaudy (France) Anne Tran | 21–18, 21–10 | (gold) Winner |
| 2013 | Irish International | (Finland) Anton Kaisti | (France) Jordan Corvée (France) Marie Batomene | 20–22, 21–17, 21–13 | (gold) Winner |
| 2016 | Hellas Open | (Finland) Henri Aarnio | (Poland) Paweł Pietryja (Poland) Aneta Wojtkowska | 17–21, 17–21 | (silver) Runner-up |
| 2016 | Norwegian International | (Finland) Anton Kaisti | (Denmark) Mathias Bay-Smidt (Denmark) Alexandra Bøje | 21–12, 21–12 | (gold) Winner |
| 2016 | Finnish International | (Finland) Anton Kaisti | (Denmark) Philip Seerup (Denmark) Irina Amalie Andersen | 11–6, 12–14, 11–7, 15–13 | (gold) Winner |
| 2017 | Portugal International | (Finland) Anton Kaisti | (France) Thom Gicquel (France) Delphine Delrue | 19–21, 21–19, 21–12 | (gold) Winner |
| 2017 | Dutch International | (Finland) Anton Kaisti | (Netherlands) Jim Middelburg (Netherlands) Myke Halkema | 21–18, 21–18 | (gold) Winner |
| 2019 | Bulgarian International | (Finland) Julius von Pfaler | (Bulgaria) Stiliyan Makarski (Bulgaria) Diana Dimova | 21–17, 13–21, 17–21 | (silver) Runner-up |

BWF International Challenge tournament
BWF International Series tournament
BWF Future Series tournament
