= 2018 BWF World Championships qualification =

These are the lists of entries of 2018 BWF World Championships (World Badminton Championships) qualification.

== Overview ==
=== Events ===
This event holds men's singles and doubles, women's singles and doubles, and mixed doubles.

=== Number of players/member association quota ===
This event's total limit of eligibility players is 400 players, the following charts are the rules and the distribution.

	Men's singles	Women's singles	Men's doubles	Women's doubles	Mixed doubles	Total
Entry limits	64 players	48 players	96 players (48 pairs)	96 players (48 pairs)	96 players (48 pairs)	400 players

Players / pairs ranked on date eligible	Total number of players / pairs from any one Member Association in that event shall not exceed
1 to 8	4
9 to 24	3
25 to 150	2

== Participating players ==
=== Number of participant ===
Country	MS	WS	MD	WD	XD	Total
Algeria				1		1
Australia		1				1
Austria	1					1
Belgium	1			1		2
Brazil	1					1
Bulgaria	1	2	2	1	1	7
Canada	1	2	1	1	1	6
China	4	3	4	4	4	19
Chinese Taipei	3	2	4	4	4	17
Croatia	1					1
Czech Republic	2				1	3
Denmark	4	2	3	1	2	12
Egypt			1	1		2
England	2	1	1		3	7
Estonia	1					1
Finland	2					2
France	2			2	3	7
Germany	1	1	2	4	3	11
Hong Kong	2	2	2	2	2	10
Hungary	1					1
India	4	2	4	4	4	18
Indonesia	3	2	4	4	4	17
Ireland	1				1	2
Israel	1					1
Italy	1			1		2
Japan	4	4	4	4	2	18
Jordan			1			1
Malaysia	2	2	2	2	3	11
Mauritius	1	1				2
Netherlands	1	2	2	2	2	9
New Zealand	1					1
Nigeria					1	1
Norway					1	1
Peru				1		1
Poland	1		1			2
Portugal	1					1
Russia	2	2	3	1	2	10
Scotland		1	1			2
Slovakia		1				1
South Korea	1	1	1	1		4
Spain	2	2				4
Sri Lanka	1					1
Switzerland		1			1	2
Thailand	3	4	2	3	1	13
Turkey	1	2		1		4
Ukraine	1	1		1		3
United States		2	1	1	1	5
Vietnam	2	2	2		1	7
Total (48 NOCs)	64	48	48	48	48	256

=== Men's singles ===
Due to the phase 2 updated by BWF, the following chart is the invitation results.

Players who ranked from 1 to 8, whose association can nominate players for 4.
Players who ranked from 9 to 24, whose association can nominate players for 3.
Players who ranked from 25 to 150, whose association can nominate players for 2.

Rank	Nation / Player	Points	Eligibility		Note
1	(Denmark) Viktor Axelsen	75,470	1	Denmark (1)	BE highest ranked
2	(South Korea) Son Wan-ho	74,670	2	South Korea (1)	BAC highest ranked
3	(China) Chen Long	73,466	3	China (1)	Host nation's presenter
4	(China) Shi Yuqi	72,743	4	China (2)	
5	(India) Srikanth Kidambi	72,695	5	India (1)	
6	(Chinese Taipei) Chou Tien-chen	65,521	6	Chinese Taipei (1)	
7	(Malaysia) Lee Chong Wei	65,394	7	Malaysia (1)	
8	(China) Lin Dan	59,836	8	China (3)	
9	(Hong Kong) Ng Ka Long	55,029	9	Hong Kong (1)	
10	(India) Prannoy Kumar	52,800	10	India (2)	
11	(Chinese Taipei) Wang Tzu-wei	50,482	11	Chinese Taipei (2)	
12	(Indonesia) Anthony Sinisuka Ginting	50,475	12	Indonesia (1)	
13	(Japan) Kenta Nishimoto	50,193	13	Japan (1)	
14	(Indonesia) Jonatan Christie	49,783	14	Indonesia (2)	
15	(Denmark) Anders Antonsen	48,937	15	Denmark (2)	
16	(Japan) Kazumasa Sakai	45,646	16	Japan (2)	
17	(Japan) Kento Momota	44,114	17	Japan (3)	
18	(Denmark) Hans-Kristian Vittinghus	43,990	18	Denmark (3)	
19	(India) B. Sai Praneeth	43,457	19	India (3)	
20	(South Korea) Jeon Hyeok-jin	43,310		~~South Korea (1)~~	Withdrawn
21	(England) Rajiv Ouseph	43,069	20	England (1)	
22	(South Korea) Lee Hyun-il	42,770		~~South Korea (3)~~	Decline
23	(Hong Kong) Wong Wing Ki	42,218	21	Hong Kong (2)	
24	(France) Brice Leverdez	39,554	22	France (1)	
25	(Thailand) Khosit Phetpradab	39,252	23	Thailand (1)	
26	(Chinese Taipei) Hsu Jen-hao	38,200	58	Chinese Taipei (3)	Reserve 1
27	(Thailand) Suppanyu Avihingsanon	37,436	24	Thailand (2)	
28	(Thailand) Tanongsak Saensomboonsuk	36,910	59	Thailand (3)	Reserve 2
29	(India) Sameer Verma	36,729	60	India (4)	Reserve 3
30	(Indonesia) Tommy Sugiarto	36,300	61	Indonesia (3)	Reserve 4
31	(Netherlands) Mark Caljouw	36,170	25	Netherlands (1)	
32	(Denmark) Rasmus Gemke	35,694	62	Denmark (4)	Reserve 5
33	(Japan) Kanta Tsuneyama	35,167	63	Japan (4)	Reserve 6
34	(Brazil) Ygor Coelho de Oliveira	34,390	26	Brazil (1)	BPA highest ranked
35	(China) Huang Yuxiang	34,180	64	China (4)	Reserve 7
36	(Thailand) Kantaphon Wangcharoen	33,361		Thailand (4)	Reserve 8
37	(India) Parupalli Kashyap	33,220		India (5)	Reserve 9
38	(Hong Kong) Lee Cheuk Yiu	33,078		Hong Kong (3)	Reserve 10
39	(South Korea) Lee Dong-keun	32,899		South Korea (4)	Reserve 11
40	(Hong Kong) Hu Yun	31,822		Hong Kong (4)	Reserve 12
41	(Malaysia) Liew Daren	31,550	27	Malaysia (2)	
42	(Spain) Pablo Abián	30,819	28	Spain (1)	
43	(China) Qiao Bin	30,744		China (5)	Reserve 13
44	(Malaysia) Chong Wei Feng	30,660		Malaysia (3)	Reserve 14
45	(Chinese Taipei) Lin Yu-hsien	30,648		Chinese Taipei (4)	Reserve 15
46	(Malaysia) Lee Zii Jia	29,835		Malaysia (4)	Reserve 16
47	(Denmark) Emil Holst	29,316		Denmark (5)	Reserve 17
48	(Indonesia) Ihsan Maulana Mustofa	29,035		Indonesia (4)	Reserve 18
49	(France) Lucas Corvée	28,199	29	France (2)	
50	(Thailand) Pannawit Thongnuam	28,103		Thailand (5)	Reserve 19
51	(Malaysia) Iskandar Zulkarnain Zainuddin	27,544		Malaysia (5)	Reserve 20
52	(Russia) Vladimir Malkov	26,792	30	Russia (1)	
53	(China) Tian Houwei	26,280		China (6)	Reserve 21
54	(Israel) Misha Zilberman	26,194	31	Israel (1)	
55	(Hong Kong) Wei Nan	23,980		Hong Kong (5)	Reserve 22
56	(Vietnam) Nguyễn Tiến Minh	23,873	32	Vietnam (1)	
57	(India) Sourabh Verma	23,040		India (6)	Reserve 23
58	(Malaysia) Soong Joo Ven	23,025		Malaysia (6)	Reserve 24
59	(France) Lucas Claerbout	22,944		France (3)	Reserve 25
60	(Denmark) Jan Ø. Jørgensen	22,277		Denmark (6)	Reserve 26
61	(Denmark) Victor Svendsen	22,260		Denmark (7)	Reserve 27
62	(India) Subhankar Dey	22,160		India (7)	Reserve 28
63	(Japan) Yu Igarashi	22,046		Japan (5)	Reserve 29
64	(England) Toby Penty	21,910	33	England (2)	
65	(France) Thomas Rouxel	21,734		France (4)	Reserve 30
66	(England) Sam Parsons	20,193		England (3)	Reserve 31
67	(Indonesia) Panji Ahmad Maulana	20,180		Indonesia (5)	Reserve 32
68	(Guatemala) Kevin Cordón	20,030		~~Guatemala (1)~~	Withdrawn
69	(Finland) Kalle Koljonen	19,780	34	Finland (1)	
70	(Finland) Eetu Heino	19,520	35	Finland (2)	
71	(Canada) Jason Ho-shue	19,300	36	Canada (1)	
72	(Malaysia) Zulfadli Zulkiffli	19,240		Malaysia (7)	Reserve 33
73	(Russia) Sergey Sirant	19,135	37	Russia (2)	
74	(Japan) Koki Watanabe	19,090		Japan (6)	Reserve 34
75	(Indonesia) Shesar Hiren Rhustavito	18,940		Indonesia (6)	Reserve 35
76	(Estonia) Raul Must	18,923	38	Estonia (1)	
77	(India) Ajay Jayaram	18,795		India (8)	Reserve 36
78	(Thailand) Sitthikom Thammasin	18,590		Thailand (6)	Reserve 37
79	(Italy) Rosario Maddaloni	18,563	39	Italy (1)	
80	(Vietnam) Phạm Cao Cường	18,350	40	Vietnam (2)	
81	(Malaysia) Leong Jun Hao	18,170		Malaysia (8)	Reserve 38
82	(Malaysia) Cheam June Wei	18,120		Malaysia (9)	Reserve 39
83	(Ukraine) Artem Pochtarov	18,013	41	Ukraine (1)	
84	(Denmark) Kim Bruun	17,910		Denmark (8)	Reserve 40
85	(India) Rahul Yadav Chittaboina	17,680		India (9)	Reserve 41
86	(Indonesia) Firman Abdul Kholik	17,676		Indonesia (7)	Reserve 42
87	(Republic of Ireland) Nhat Nguyen	17,525	42	Ireland (1)	
88	(Japan) Takuma Ueda	17,430		Japan (7)	Reserve 43
89	(Hungary) Gergely Krausz	17,401	43	Hungary (1)	
90	(Chinese Taipei) Lu Chia-hung	17,340		Chinese Taipei (5)	Reserve 44
91	(Mauritius) Georges Paul	17,265	44	Mauritius (1)	BCA highest ranked
92	(India) Abhishek Yeligar	17,220		India (10)	Reserve 45
93	(Germany) Kai Schäfer	17,175	45	Germany (1)	
94	(Germany) Alexander Roovers	17,175		~~Germany (2)~~	Reserve 46, Decline
95	(Germany) Marc Zwiebler	17,032		Germany (3)	Reserve 47
96	(Czech Republic) Milan Ludík	16,827	46	Czech Republic (1)	
97	(India) Karan Rajan Rajarajan	16,800		India (11)	Reserve 48
98	(India) Shreyansh Jaiswal	16,430		India (12)	Reserve 49
99	(China) Zhao Junpeng	16,430		China (7)	Reserve 50
100	(Spain) Luís Enrique Peñalver	16,192	47	Spain (2)	
101	(Thailand) Adulrach Namkul	16,110		Thailand (7)	
102	(Malaysia) Goh Giap Chin	15,980		Malaysia (10)	
103	(Croatia) Zvonimir Đurkinjak	15,835	48	Croatia (1)	
104	(Turkey) Emre Lale	15,797	49	Turkey (1)	
105	(Singapore) Ryan Ng Zin Rei	15,593		~~Singapore (1)~~	Withdrawn
106	(Belgium) Maxime Moreels	15,587	50	Belgium (1)	
107	(Scotland) Kieran Merrilees	15,403		~~Scotland (1)~~	Decline
108	(India) Lakshya Sen	15,230		India (13)	
109	(Malaysia) Lim Chi Wing	15,210		Malaysia (11)	
110	(Finland) Iikka Heino	14,744		Finland (3)	
111	(Indonesia) Sony Dwi Kuncoro	14,600		Indonesia (8)	
112	(Finland) Henri Aarnio	14,576		Finland (4)	
113	(Poland) Adrian Dziółko	14,485	51	Poland (1)	
114	(India) Gurusai Dutt	14,290		India (14)	
115	(Germany) Fabian Roth	13,901		~~Germany (4)~~	Withdrawn
116	(Chinese Taipei) Lee Chia-hao	13,790		Chinese Taipei (6)	
117	(Cuba) Osleni Guerrero	13,710		~~Cuba (1)~~	Decline
118	(Bulgaria) Ivan Rusev	13,668	52	Bulgaria (1)	
119	(Cuba) Leodannis Martínez	13,260		~~Cuba (2)~~	Decline
120	(India) Mithun Manjunath	13,240		India (15)	
121	(Germany) Lars Schänzler	13,192		Germany (5)	
122	(Portugal) Duarte Nuno Anjo	13,182	53	Portugal (1)	
123	(India) Siril Verma	13,130		India (16)	
124	(Malaysia) Tan Jia Wei	13,110		Malaysia (12)	
125	(Sweden) Jacob Nilsson	13,040		Sweden (1)	
126	(Czech Republic) Adam Mendrek	13,024	54	Czech Republic (2)	
127	(India) Kartikey Gulshan Kumar	12,890		India (17)	
128	(Austria) Luka Wraber	12,865	55	Austria (1)	
129	(South Korea) Heo Kwang-hee	12,833		South Korea (5)	
130	(Sweden) Felix Burestedt	12,670		~~Sweden (2)~~	Decline
131	(Sri Lanka) Niluka Karunaratne	12,641	56	Sri Lanka (1)	
132	(Turkey) Muhammed Ali Kurt	12,580		Turkey (2)	
133	(Jordan) Bahaedeen Ahmad Alshannik	12,530		Jordan (1)	
134	(France) Pierrick Cajot	12,500		France (5)	
135	(Vietnam) Lễ Phật Đản	12,440		Vietnam (3)	
136	(Norway) Marius Myhre	12,130		Norway (1)	
137	(Mexico) Lino Muñoz	12,130		Mexico (1)	
138	(Germany) Jonathan Persson	11,900		Germany (6)	
139	(England) Wang Yuehang	12,690		England (4)	
140	(India) Sahil Sipani	12,680		India (18)	
141	(Japan) Hashiru Shimono	11,550		Japan (8)	
142	(Japan) Kodai Naraoka	11,480		Japan (9)	
143	(Thailand) Kunlavut Vitidsarn	11,460		Thailand (8)	
144	(Malaysia) Soo Teck Zhi	11,210		Malaysia (13)	
145	(New Zealand) Abhinav Manota	11,002	57	New Zealand (1)	BO highest ranked
146	(Mexico) Job Castillo	11,000		Mexico (2)	
147	(Malaysia) Chong Yee Han	10,980		Malaysia (14)	
148	(Australia) Anthony Joe	10,959		Australia (1)	
149	(France) Toma Junior Popov	10,907		France (6)	
150	(Poland) Michał Rogalski	10,886		Poland (2)	

=== Women's singles ===
Due to the phase 2 updated by BWF, the following chart is the invitation results.

Players who ranked from 1 to 8, whose association can nominate players for 4.
Players who ranked from 9 to 24, whose association can nominate players for 3.
Players who ranked from 25 to 150, whose association can nominate players for 2.

Rank	Nation / Player	Points	Eligibility		Note
1	(Japan) Akane Yamaguchi	87,411	1	Japan (1)	BAC highest ranked
2	(Chinese Taipei) Tai Tzu-ying	87,109	2	Chinese Taipei (1)	
3	(India) P. V. Sindhu	78,824	3	India (1)	
4	(Thailand) Ratchanok Intanon	75,460	4	Thailand (1)	
5	(China) Chen Yufei	66,658	5	China (1)	Host nation's presenter
6	(Japan) Nozomi Okuhara	66,147	6	Japan (2)	
7	(Spain) Carolina Marín	64,816	7	Spain (1)	BE highest ranked
8	(China) He Bingjiao	60,979	8	China (2)	
9	(South Korea) Sung Ji-hyun	58,495	9	South Korea (1)	
10	(Thailand) Nitchaon Jindapol	55,093	10	Thailand (2)	
11	(United States) Zhang Beiwen	53,310	11	United States (1)	BPA highest ranked
12	(India) Saina Nehwal	53,070	12	India (2)	
13	(Japan) Sayaka Sato	50,346	13	Japan (3)	
14	(Japan) Aya Ohori	46,206	47	Japan (4)	Reserve 1
15	(South Korea) Lee Jang-mi	45,834		~~South Korea (2)~~	Decline
16	(Canada) Michelle Li	44,450	14	Canada (1)	
17	(Scotland) Kirsty Gilmour	42,597	15	Scotland (1)	
18	(Japan) Saena Kawakami	42,040		Japan (5)	Reserve 2
19	(Japan) Sayaka Takahashi	41,270		Japan (6)	Reserve 3
20	(Denmark) Mia Blichfeldt	40,440	16	Denmark (1)	
21	(Chinese Taipei) Pai Yu-po	38,750	17	Chinese Taipei (2)	
22	(China) Chen Xiaoxin	38,575	18	China (3)	
23	(Thailand) Pornpawee Chochuwong	38,132	19	Thailand (3)	
24	(Thailand) Busanan Ongbamrungphan	37,304	48	Thailand (4)	Reserve 4
25	(Russia) Evgeniya Kosetskaya	36,729	20	Russia (1)	
26	(Malaysia) Soniia Cheah Su Ya	36,439	21	Malaysia (1)	
27	(Spain) Beatriz Corrales	35,953	22	Spain (2)	
28	(South Korea) Kim Hyo-min	35,220		South Korea (3)	Reserve 5
29	(Hong Kong) Cheung Ngan Yi	34,567	23	Hong Kong (1)	
30	(Malaysia) Goh Jin Wei	34,487	24	Malaysia (2)	
31	(Denmark) Line Kjærsfeldt	34,152	25	Denmark (2)	
32	(Chinese Taipei) Lee Chia-hsin	33,733		Chinese Taipei (3)	Reserve 6
33	(Indonesia) Fitriani	33,359	26	Indonesia (1)	
34	(Hong Kong) Yip Pui Yin	32,715	27	Hong Kong (2)	
35	(Denmark) Natalia Koch Rohde	31,219		Denmark (3)	Reserve 7
36	(Japan) Minatsu Mitani	30,980		Japan (7)	Reserve 8
37	(Indonesia) Gregoria Mariska Tunjung	30,957	28	Indonesia (2)	
38	(China) Gao Fangjie	30,685		China (4)	Reserve 9
39	(Indonesia) Hanna Ramadini	30,473		Indonesia (3)	Reserve 10
40	(Turkey) Neslihan Yiğit	30,384	29	Turkey (1)	
41	(Bulgaria) Linda Zetchiri	29,583	30	Bulgaria (1)	
42	(China) Sun Yu	29,571		China (5)	Reserve 11
43	(Japan) Haruko Suzuki	29,090		Japan (8)	Reserve 12
44	(Indonesia) Dinar Dyah Ayustine	28,740		Indonesia (4)	Reserve 13
45	(Canada) Rachel Honderich	28,447	31	Canada (2)	
46	(Malaysia) Lee Ying Ying	28,190		Malaysia (3)	Reserve 14
47	(Japan) Natsuki Nidaira	27,660		Japan (9)	Reserve 15
48	(Canada) Brittney Tam	27,353		Canada (3)	Reserve 16
49	(Denmark) Mette Poulsen	27,340		Denmark (4)	Reserve 17
50	(Chinese Taipei) Sung Shuo-yun	27,247		Chinese Taipei (4)	Reserve 18
51	(Chinese Taipei) Chiang Ying-li	27,181		Chinese Taipei (5)	Reserve 19
52	(Denmark) Julie Dawall Jakobsen	24,686		Denmark (5)	Reserve 20
53	(Chinese Taipei) Chen Su-yu	24,500		Chinese Taipei (6)	Reserve 21
54	(Vietnam) Vũ Thị Trang	24,432	32	Vietnam (1)	
55	(India) Gadde Ruthvika Shivani	24,226		India (3)	Reserve 22
56	(Germany) Luise Heim	23,386		~~Germany (1)~~	Withdrawn
57	(Russia) Natalia Perminova	23,035	33	Russia (2)	
58	(China) Qi Xuefei	22,690		China (6)	Reserve 23
59	(Malaysia) Kisona Selvaduray	22,509		Malaysia (4)	Reserve 24
60	(Denmark) Sofie Holmboe Dahl	22,220		Denmark (6)	Reserve 25
61	(Vietnam) Nguyễn Thùy Linh	22,210	34	Vietnam (2)	
62	(India) Vaishnavi Reddy Jakka	21,860		India (4)	Reserve 26
63	(Mauritius) Kate Foo Kune	21,774	35	Mauritius (1)	BCA highest ranked
64	(India) Sri Krishna Priya Kudaravalli	21,771		India (5)	Reserve 27
65	(England) Chloe Birch	21,751	36	England (1)	
66	(Bulgaria) Mariya Mitsova	21,101	37	Bulgaria (2)	
67	(France) Delphine Lansac	21,100		~~France (1)~~	Reserve 28, Decline
68	(Japan) Shiori Saito	21,010		Japan (10)	Reserve 29
69	(Indonesia) Lyanny Alessandra Mainaky	20,950		Indonesia (5)	Reserve 30
70	(Netherlands) Soraya de Visch Eijbergen	20,630	38	Netherlands (1)	
71	(United States) Jamie Subandhi	20,538		~~United States (2)~~	Decline
72	(Switzerland) Sabrina Jaquet	20,220	39	Switzerland (1)	
73	(Germany) Fabienne Deprez	19,664	40	Germany (2)	
74	(Thailand) Pattarasuda Chaiwan	19,000		Thailand (5)	Reserve 31
75	(Malaysia) Muralitharan Thinaah	18,600		Malaysia (5)	Reserve 32
76	(Malaysia) Ho Yen Mei	18,600		Malaysia (6)	Reserve 33
77	(Ukraine) Marija Ulitina	18,589	41	Ukraine (1)	
78	(Spain) Clara Azurmendi	18,540		Spain (3)	Reserve 34
79	(Indonesia) Ruselli Hartawan	18,348		Indonesia (6)	Reserve 35
80	(Australia) Chen Hsuan-yu	18,303	42	Australia (1)	BO highest ranked
81	(Netherlands) Gayle Mahulette	18,180	43	Netherlands (2)	
82	(Turkey) Aliye Demirbağ	18,173	44	Turkey (2)	
83	(Germany) Yvonne Li	18,056		Germany (3)	Reserve 36
84	(Slovakia) Martina Repiská	17,867	45	Slovakia (1)	
85	(India) Mugdha Agrey	17,830		India (6)	Reserve 37
86	(Indonesia) Yulia Yosephin Susanto	17,300		Indonesia (7)	Reserve 38
87	(Israel) Ksenia Polikarpova	17,260		~~Israel (1)~~	Reserve 39, Not eligible
88	(United States) Jamie Hsu	17,012	46	United States (3)	
89	(India) Saili Rane	16,800		India (7)	Reserve 40
90	(India) Sai Uttejitha Rao Chukka	16,750		India (8)	Reserve 41
91	(Malaysia) Lim Yin Fun	16,728		Malaysia (7)	Reserve 42
92	(Thailand) Thamolwan Poopradubsil	16,590		Thailand (6)	Reserve 43
93	(Peru) Daniela Macías	16,559		Peru (1)	Reserve 44
94	(Denmark) Irina Amalie Andersen	16,320		Denmark (7)	Reserve 45
95	(India) Rasika Raje	15,920		India (9)	Reserve 46
96	(Switzerland) Ayla Huser	15,880		Switzerland (2)	Reserve 47
97	(Nigeria) Dorcas Ajoke Adesokan	15,798		Nigeria (1)	Reserve 48
98	(China) Wang Zhiyi	15,790		China (7)	Reserve 49
99	(Singapore) Yeo Jia Min	15,798		Singapore (1)	Reserve 50
100	(Ukraine) Natalya Voytsekh	15,617		Ukraine (2)	
101	(India) Rituparna Das	15,540		India (10)	
102	(India) Vaidehi Choudhari	15,520		India (11)	
103	(Belarus) Alesia Zaitsava	15,470		Belarus (1)	
104	(England) Fontaine Mica Wright	15,110		England (2)	
105	(South Korea) Kim Ga-eun	14,940		South Korea (4)	
106	(South Korea) Jeon Ju-i	14,840		South Korea (5)	
107	(Uganda) Aisha Nakiyemba	14,465		Uganda (1)	
108	(China) Cai Yanyan	14,360		China (8)	
109	(India) Anura Prabhudesai	14,330		India (12)	
110	(Singapore) Grace Chua Hui Zhen	14,274		Singapore (2)	
111	(India) Vrushali Gummadi	14,020		India (13)	
112	(Estonia) Kristin Kuuba	14,006		Estonia (1)	
113	(Hungary) Agnes Korosi	13,920		Hungary (1)	
114	(China) Han Yue	13,920		China (9)	
115	(Denmark) Anna Thea Madsen	13,720		Denmark (8)	
116	(Turkey) Özge Bayrak	13,600		Turkey (3)	
117	(South Korea) Lee Se-yeon	12,980		South Korea (6)	
118	(Indonesia) Asty Dwi Widyaningrum	12,970		Indonesia (8)	
119	(Estonia) Getter Saar	12,825		Estonia (2)	
120	(Czech Republic) Kateřina Tomalová	12,775		Czech Republic (1)	
121	(Belgium) Lianne Tan	12,640		Belgium (1)	
122	(China) Zhang Yiman	12,390		China (10)	
123	(Cuba) Tahimara Oropeza	12,270		Cuba (1)	
124	(Egypt) Hadia Hosny	11,968		Egypt (1)	
125	(Japan) Asuka Takahashi	11,830		Japan (11)	
126	(Australia) Jennifer Tam	11,813		Australia (2)	
127	(Thailand) Chananchida Jucharoen	11,730		Thailand (7)	
128	(India) Reshma Karthik	11,720		India (14)	
129	(Wales) Jordan Hart	11,590		Wales (1)	
130	(Indonesia) Jesica Muljati	11,560		Indonesia (9)	
131	(Japan) Natsumi Shimoda	11,560		Japan (12)	
132	(Hong Kong) Deng Xuan	11,550		Hong Kong (3)	
133	(Russia) Ksenia Evgenova	11,421		Russia (3)	
134	(Indonesia) Rusydina Antardayu Riodingin	11,390		Indonesia (10)	
135	(England) Georgina Bland	11,020		England (3)	
136	(Thailand) Porntip Buranaprasertsuk	10,980		Thailand (8)	
137	(Denmark) Amalie Hertz	10,860		Denmark (9)	
138	(Switzerland) Ronja Stern	10,830		Switzerland (3)	
139	(India) Riya Mookerjee	10,770		India (15)	
140	(Portugal) Sonia Gonçalves	10,681		Portugal (1)	
141	(Chinese Taipei) Lin Hsiang-ti	10,680		Chinese Taipei (7)	
142	(Thailand) Sarita Suwannakitborihan	10,440		Thailand (9)	
143	(Australia) Louisa Ma	10,231		Australia (3)	
144	(Chinese Taipei) Chen Hsiao-huan	10,220		Chinese Taipei (8)	
145	(Czech Republic) Zuzana Pavelková	10,217		Czech Republic (2)	
146	(Spain) Sara Peñalver Pereira	10,112		Spain (4)	
147	(Peru) Fernanda Saponara Rivva	10,090		Peru (2)	
148	(Finland) Airi Mikkelä	10,070		Finland (1)	
149	(Egypt) Doha Hany	10,050		Egypt (2)	
150	(Thailand) Supanida Katethong	10,030		Thailand (10)	

=== Men's doubles ===
Due to the phase 2 updated by BWF, the following chart is the invitation results.

Players who ranked from 1 to 8, whose association can nominate players for 4.
Players who ranked from 9 to 24, whose association can nominate players for 3.
Players who ranked from 25 to 150, whose association can nominate players for 2.

Rank	Nation / Player	Points	Eligibility		Note
1	(Indonesia) Marcus Fernaldi Gideon (Indonesia) Kevin Sanjaya Sukamuljo	97,789	1	Indonesia (1)	BAC highest ranked
2	(Denmark) Mathias Boe (Denmark) Carsten Mogensen	83,724	2	Denmark (1)	BE highest ranked
3	(China) Liu Cheng (China) Zhang Nan	75,440	3	China (1)	Host nation's presenter
4	(China) Li Junhui (China) Liu Yuchen	72,381	4	China (2)	
5	(Japan) Takeshi Kamura (Japan) Keigo Sonoda	66,615	5	Japan (1)	
6	(Denmark) Mads Conrad-Petersen (Denmark) Mads Pieler Kolding	64,147	6	Denmark (2)	
7	(Chinese Taipei) Chen Hung-ling (Chinese Taipei) Wang Chi-lin	56,454	7	Chinese Taipei (1)	
8	(Chinese Taipei) Lee Jhe-huei (Chinese Taipei) Lee Yang	55,452	8	Chinese Taipei (2)	
9	(Japan) Takuto Inoue (Japan) Yuki Kaneko	53,220	9	Japan (2)	
10	(Indonesia) Fajar Alfian (Indonesia) Muhammad Rian Ardianto	52,340	10	Indonesia (2)	
11	(Russia) Vladimir Ivanov (Russia) Ivan Sozonov	51,820	11	Russia (1)	
12	(Denmark) Kim Astrup (Denmark) Anders Skaarup Rasmussen	51,434	12	Denmark (3)	
13	(Chinese Taipei) Lu Ching-yao (Chinese Taipei) Yang Po-han	49,340	13	Chinese Taipei (3)	
14	(Chinese Taipei) Liao Min-chun (Chinese Taipei) Su Ching-heng	48,110	40	Chinese Taipei (4)	Reserve 1
15	(Japan) Takuro Hoki (Japan) Yugo Kobayashi	45,196	14	Japan (3)	
16	(Malaysia) Goh V Shem (Malaysia) Tan Wee Kiong	43,783	15	Malaysia (1)	
17	(Malaysia) Ong Yew Sin (Malaysia) Teo Ee Yi	42,834	16	Malaysia (2)	
18	(India) Satwiksairaj Rankireddy (India) Chirag Shetty	40,166	17	India (1)	
19	(Indonesia) Mohammad Ahsan (Indonesia) Rian Agung Saputro	40,158		~~Indonesia (3)~~	Decline
20	(England) Marcus Ellis (England) Chris Langridge	38,778	18	England (1)	
21	(South Korea) Kim Won-ho (South Korea) Seo Seung-jae	38,769		~~South Korea (1)~~	Decline
22	(Denmark) Mathias Christiansen (Denmark) David Daugaard	37,890		~~Denmark (4)~~	Reserve 2, Decline
23	(Thailand) Tinn Isriyanet (Thailand) Kittisak Namdash	36,495	19	Thailand (1)	
24	(South Korea) Chung Eui-seok (South Korea) Kim Duk-young	36,420	20	South Korea (2)	
25	(Indonesia) Berry Angriawan (Indonesia) Hardianto	36,310	41	Indonesia (4)	Reserve 3
26	(Thailand) Dechapol Puavaranukroh (Thailand) Kittinupong Kedren	35,991	21	Thailand (2)	
27	(Germany) Jones Ralfy Jansen (Germany) Josche Zurwonne	34,868	22	Germany (1)	
28	(Indonesia) Hendra Setiawan (Malaysia) Tan Boon Heong	34,840		~~Indonesia (4.5)~~; ~~Malaysia (2.5)~~	Reserve 4, Decline
29	(Japan) Hiroyuki Endo (Japan) Yuta Watanabe	34,730	42	Japan (4)	Reserve 5
30	(China) Han Chengkai (China) Zhou Haodong	34,426	43	China (3)	Reserve 6
31	(Thailand) Bodin Isara (Thailand) Nipitphon Phuangphuapet	34,278		~~Thailand (3)~~	Reserve 7, Decline
32	(Germany) Mark Lamsfuß (Germany) Marvin Emil Seidel	34,226	23	Germany (2)	
33	(India) Manu Attri (India) B. Sumeeth Reddy	33,770	24	India (2)	
34	(Denmark) Kasper Antonsen (Denmark) Niclas Nøhr	31,180		~~Denmark (5)~~	Reserve 8, Decline
35	(Indonesia) Angga Pratama (Indonesia) Ricky Karanda Suwardi	31,010		~~Indonesia (5.5)~~	Reserve 9, Decline
36	(England) Peter Briggs (England) Tom Wolfenden	30,354		~~England (2)~~	Decline
37	(Hong Kong) Or Chin Chung (Hong Kong) Tang Chun Man	29,885	25	Hong Kong (1)	
38	(Netherlands) Jelle Maas (Netherlands) Robin Tabeling	29,800	26	Netherlands (1)	
39	(Indonesia) Wahyu Nayaka (Indonesia) Ade Yusuf	29,790	44	Indonesia (6.5)	Reserve 10
40	(Netherlands) Jacco Arends (Netherlands) Ruben Jille	29,670	27	Netherlands (2)	
41	(Canada) Jason Ho-shue (Canada) Nyl Yakura	29,181	28	Canada (1)	BPA highest ranked
42	(China) He Jiting (China) Tan Qiang	29,152	45	China (4)	Reserve 11
43	(China) Huang Kaixiang (China) Wang Yilü	28,790		China (5)	Reserve 12
44	(Malaysia) Chooi Kah Ming (Malaysia) Low Juan Shen	28,320		~~Malaysia (3.5)~~	Reserve 13, Decline
45	(England) Ben Lane (England) Sean Vendy	28,076		~~England (3)~~	Decline
46	(India) Arjun M.R. (India) Ramchandran Shlok	26,599	46	India (3)	Reserve 14
47	(France) Bastian Kersaudy (France) Julien Maio	26,201		~~France (1)~~	Withdrawn
48	(Russia) Konstantin Abramov (Russia) Alexandr Zinchenko	24,833	29	Russia (2)	
49	(Scotland) Alexander Dunn (Scotland) Adam Hall	24,000	30	Scotland (1)	
50	(Poland) Miłosz Bochat (Poland) Adam Cwalina	23,809	31	Poland (1)	
51	(Belgium) Matijs Dierickx (Belgium) Freek Golinski	22,972		~~Belgium (1)~~	Decline
52	(Hong Kong) Law Cheuk Him (Hong Kong) Lee Chun Hei	22,588	32	Hong Kong (2)	
53	(Malaysia) Goh Sze Fei (Malaysia) Nur Izzuddin	22,261		~~Malaysia (4.5)~~	Reserve 15, Decline
54	(Malaysia) Shia Chun Kang (Malaysia) Tan Wee Gieen	21,530		~~Malaysia (5.5)~~	Reserve 16, Decline
55	(India) Tarun Kona (India) Saurabh Sharma	20,720	47	India (4)	Reserve 17
56	(Australia) Matthew Chau (Australia) Sawan Serasinghe	20,186		~~Australia (1)~~	BO highest ranked, Decline
57	(Indonesia) Hendra Setiawan (Indonesia) Mohammad Ahsan	20,120		Indonesia (7.5)	Reserve 18
58	(Scotland) Martin Campbell (Scotland) Patrick MacHugh	20,088		~~Scotland (2)~~	Decline
59	(Chinese Taipei) Po Li-wei (Chinese Taipei) Yang Ming-tse	20,070		Chinese Taipei (5)	Reserve 19
60	(Denmark) Mathias Bay-Smidt (Denmark) Frederik Søgaard Mortensen	19,870		Denmark (6)	Reserve 20
61	(United States) Phillip Chew (United States) Ryan Chew	19,343	33	United States (1)	
62	(Russia) Evgenij Dremin (Russia) Denis Grachev	19,220	48	Russia (3)	Reserve 21
63	(India) Francis Alwin (India) Nandagopal Kidambi	18,550		India (5)	Reserve 22
64	(South Korea) Choi Hyuk-gyun (South Korea) Park Kyung-hoon	17,990		~~South Korea (3)~~	Decline
65	(Jordan) Bahaedeen Ahmad Alshannik (Jordan) Mohd Naser Mansour Nayef	17,900	34	Jordan (1)	
66	(India) Arun George (India) Sanyam Shukla	17,890		India (6)	Reserve 23
67	(Malaysia) Aaron Chia (Malaysia) Soh Wooi Yik	17,560		Malaysia (6.5)	Reserve 24
68	(Denmark) Frederik Colberg (Denmark) Rasmus Fladberg	17,410		Denmark (7)	Reserve 25
69	(Malaysia) Ong Yew Sin (Malaysia) Tan Wee Kiong	16,810		Malaysia (7.5)	Reserve 26
70	(Thailand) Supak Jomkoh (Thailand) Pakin Kuna-Anuvit	16,600		Thailand (4)	Reserve 27
71	(Mauritius) Aatish Lubah (Mauritius) Georges Paul	16,465		~~Mauritius (1)~~	BCA highest ranked, Decline
72	(Japan) Mahiro Kaneko (Japan) Yunosuke Kubota	16,280		Japan (5)	Reserve 28
73	(Indonesia) Sabar Karyaman Gutama (Indonesia) Frengky Wijaya Putra	16,230		Indonesia (8.5)	Reserve 29
74	(India) Kapil Chaudhary (India) Brijesh Yadav	16,220		India (7)	Reserve 30
75	(Japan) Hiroki Okamura (Japan) Masayuki Onodera	16,120		Japan (6)	Reserve 31
76	(Vietnam) Đỗ Tuấn Đức (Vietnam) Phạm Hồng Nam	16,118	35	Vietnam (1)	
77	(Thailand) Inkarat Apisuk (Thailand) Tanupat Viriyangkura	15,960		Thailand (5)	Reserve 32
78	(Germany) Daniel Benz (Germany) Andreas Heinz	15,940		Germany (3)	Reserve 33
79	(Denmark) Joel Eipe (Denmark) Philip Seerup	15,840		Denmark (8)	Reserve 34
80	(Japan) Keiichiro Matsui (Japan) Yoshinori Takeuchi	15,710		Japan (7)	Reserve 35
81	(Malaysia) Lee Jian Yi (Malaysia) Lim Zhen Ting	15,690		Malaysia (8.5)	Reserve 36
82	(Mexico) Job Castillo (Mexico) Lino Muñoz	15,380		~~Mexico (1)~~	Reserve 37, Decline
83	(Denmark) Jeppe Bay (Denmark) Rasmus Kjær	15,140		Denmark (9)	Reserve 38
84	(Malaysia) Goh V Shem (Malaysia) Teo Ee Yi	15,050		Malaysia (9.5)	Reserve 39
85	(Indonesia) Kenas Adi Haryanto (Indonesia) Muhammad Reza Pahlevi Isfahani	14,960		Indonesia (9.5)	Reserve 40
85	(Chinese Taipei) Lee Sheng-mu (Chinese Taipei) Lin Chia-yu	14,960		Chinese Taipei (6)	Reserve 41
87	(Indonesia) Hendra Aprida Gunawan (Indonesia) Markis Kido	14,740		Indonesia (10.5)	Reserve 42
88	(Republic of Ireland) Joshua Magee (Republic of Ireland) Sam Magee	14,610		~~Ireland (1)~~	Reserve 43, Decline
89	(Vietnam) Bảo Minh (Vietnam) Dương Bảo Đức	14,590	36	Vietnam (2)	
90	(South Korea) Choi Sol-gyu (South Korea) Kim Jae-hwan	14,010		South Korea (4)	Reserve 44
91	(Finland) Henri Aarnio (Finland) Iikka Heino	13,740		~~Finland (1)~~	Decline
92	(Guatemala) Jonathan Solís (Guatemala) Rodolfo Ramírez	13,530		~~Guatemala (1)~~	Decline
93	(Thailand) Maneepong Jongjit (Thailand) Nanthakarn Yordphaisong	12,900		Thailand (6)	Reserve 45
94	(China) Chai Biao (China) Wang Zekang	12,870		China (6)	Reserve 46
95	(Chinese Taipei) Chang Ko-chi (Chinese Taipei) Lu Chia-pin	12,740		Chinese Taipei (7)	Reserve 47
96	(Peru) José Guevara (Peru) Daniel la Torre Regal	12,550		~~Peru (1)~~	Decline
97	(Germany) Peter Käsbauer (Germany) Johannes Pistorius	12,520		Germany (4)	Reserve 48
98	(India) Utkarsh Arora (India) Swarnaraj Bora	12,510		India (8)	Reserve 49
99	(India) Francis Alwin (India) Tarun Kona	12,220		India (9)	Reserve 50
100	(Australia) Simon Leung (Australia) Mitchell Wheller	12,030		~~Australia (2)~~	Decline
101	(Bulgaria) Daniel Nikolov (Bulgaria) Ivan Rusev	11,968	37	Bulgaria (1)	
102	(New Zealand) Oliver Leydon-Davis (Denmark) Lasse Mølhede	11,890		New Zealand (0.5); Denmark (9.5)	
103	(Bulgaria) Peyo Boichinov (Bulgaria) Ivan Panev	11,730	38	Bulgaria (2)	
104	(Malaysia) Lim Khim Wah (South Korea) Yoo Yeon-seong	11,640		Malaysia (10); South Korea (4.5)	
105	(Italy) Lukas Osele (Italy) Kevin Strobl	11,527		~~Italy (1)~~	Decline
106	(Singapore) Terry Hee Yong Kai (Singapore) Loh Kean Hean	11,222		~~Singapore (1)~~	Decline
107	(India) Adarsh Kumar (India) Jagadish Yadav	11,070		India (10)	
108	(Indonesia) Angga Pratama (Indonesia) Rian Agung Saputro	11,053		Indonesia (11.5)	
109	(Cuba) Osleni Guerrero (Cuba) Leodannis Martínez	10,850		Cuba (1)	
110	(Chinese Taipei) Lee Fang-chih (Chinese Taipei) Lee Fang-jen	10,770		Chinese Taipei (8)	
111	(Egypt) Abdelrahman Abdelhakim (Egypt) Ahmed Salah	10,578	39	Egypt (1)	
112	(Algeria) Mohamed Abderrahime Belarbi (Algeria) Adel Hamek	10,530		Algeria (1)	
113	(Chinese Taipei) Lu Chen (Chinese Taipei) Ye Hong-wei	10,400		Chinese Taipei (9)	
114	(Canada) Austin James Bauer (Canada) Ty Alexander Lindeman	10,242		Canada (2)	
115	(Austria) Dominik Stipsits (Austria) Roman Zirnwald	10,202		Austria (1)	
116	(Malaysia) Nur Mohd Azriyn Ayub (Malaysia) Ooi Zi Heng	10,070		Malaysia (11)	
117	(Indonesia) Akbar Bintang Cahyono (Indonesia) Muhammad Reza Pahlevi Isfahani	10,070		Indonesia (12.5)	
118	(Denmark) Steve Olesen (Denmark) Mathias Weber Estrup	9,870		Denmark (10.5)	
119	(Japan) Kohei Gondo (Japan) Tatsuya Watanabe	9,820		Japan (8)	
120	(Peru) Mario Cuba (Peru) Diego Mini	9,615		Peru (2)	
121	(South Korea) Choi Sol-gyu (South Korea) Kim Duk-young	9,599		South Korea (5.5)	
122	(France) Eloi Adam (France) Samy Corvée	9,460		France (2)	
123	(Indonesia) Muhammad Fachrikar (Indonesia) Reza Dwicahya Purnama	9,150		Indonesia (13.5)	
124	(France) Thom Gicquel (France) Ronan Labar	9,100		France (3)	
125	(Jamaica) Gareth Henry (Jamaica) Samuel O'Brien Ricketts	9,075		Jamaica (1)	
126	(France) Mathieu Gangloff (France) Tom Rodrigues	9,060		France (4)	
127	(Malaysia) Chen Tang Jie (Malaysia) Soh Wooi Yik	8,960		Malaysia (12)	
128	(Singapore) Danny Bawa Chrisnanta (Singapore) Terry Hee Yong Kai	8,880		Singapore (2)	
129	(Switzerland) Mathias Bonny (Switzerland) Oliver Schaller	8,810		Switzerland (1)	
130	(Hong Kong) Tang Chun Man (Hong Kong) Lee Chun Hei	8,773		Hong Kong (3)	
131	(Nigeria) Godwin Olofua (Nigeria) Anuoluwapo Juwon Opeyori	8,750		Nigeria (1)	
132	(Germany) Raphael Beck (Germany) Peter Käsbauer	8,670		Germany (5)	
133	(Denmark) Mikkel Mikkelsen (Denmark) Nikolaj Overgaard	8,430		Denmark (11.5)	
134	(Denmark) Emil Hybel (Denmark) Mathias Thyrri	8,380		Denmark (12.5)	
135	(Indonesia) Akbar Bintang Cahyono (Indonesia) Giovani Dicky Oktavan	8,360		Indonesia (14.5)	
136	(Sweden) Richard Eidestedt (Sweden) Nico Ruponen	8,320		Sweden (1)	
137	(England) Robert Golding (England) Victor Liew	8,190		England (4)	
138	(Australia) Robin Middleton (Australia) Ross Smith	8,183		Australia (3)	
139	(Israel) Alexander Bass (Israel) Shai Geffen	8,130		Israel (1)	
140	(Russia) Nikita Khakimov (Russia) Andrey Parakhodin	8,120		Russia (4)	
141	(Singapore) Danny Bawa Chrisnanta (Singapore) Hendra Wijaya	8,070		Singapore (3)	
142	(Slovakia) Milan Dratva (Slovakia) Matej Hliničan	8,002		Slovakia (1)	
143	(New Zealand) Jonathan Curtin (New Zealand) Dhanny Oud	7,910		New Zealand (1.5)	
144	(Germany) Patrick Scheiel (Germany) Julian Voigt	7,860		Germany (6)	
145	(Estonia) Kristjan Kaljurand (Estonia) Raul Käsner	7,794		Estonia (1)	
146	(Norway) Magnus Christensen (Norway) Fredrik Kristensen	7,763		Norway (1)	
147	(Dominican Republic) Nelson Javier (Dominican Republic) William Cabrera	7,700		Dominican Republic (1)	
148	(Austria) Philip Birker (Austria) Dominik Stipsits	7,657		Austria (2)	
149	(Jamaica) Anthony McNee (Jamaica) Dennis Coke	7,637		Jamaica (2)	
150	(Malaysia) Muhammad Amar Mohd Sani (Malaysia) Muhammad Amir Mohd Sani	7,490		Malaysia (13)	

=== Women's doubles ===
Due to the phase 2 updated by BWF, the following chart is the invitation results.

Players who ranked from 1 to 8, whose association can nominate players for 4.
Players who ranked from 9 to 24, whose association can nominate players for 3.
Players who ranked from 25 to 150, whose association can nominate players for 2.

Rank	Nation / Player	Points	Eligibility		Note
1	(China) Chen Qingchen (China) Jia Yifan	84,681	1	China (1)	BAC highest ranked Host nation's presenter
2	(Denmark) Kamilla Rytter Juhl (Denmark) Christinna Pedersen	80,148		~~Denmark (1)~~	BE highest ranked, Decline
3	(Japan) Misaki Matsutomo (Japan) Ayaka Takahashi	79,070	2	Japan (1)	
4	(Japan) Yuki Fukushima (Japan) Sayaka Hirota	75,643	3	Japan (2)	
5	(Japan) Shiho Tanaka (Japan) Koharu Yonemoto	73,261	4	Japan (3)	
6	(Indonesia) Greysia Polii (Indonesia) Apriyani Rahayu	64,684	5	Indonesia (1)	
7	(South Korea) Lee So-hee (South Korea) Shin Seung-chan	63,219	6	South Korea (1)	
8	(Thailand) Jongkolphan Kititharakul (Thailand) Rawinda Prajongjai	57,050	7	Thailand (1)	
9	(South Korea) Chang Ye-na (South Korea) Lee So-hee	53,129		~~South Korea (2)~~	Decline
10	(China) Yu Xiaohan (China) Huang Yaqiong	51,710	8	China (2)	
11	(Japan) Mayu Matsumoto (Japan) Wakana Nagahara	50,570	39	Japan (4)	Reserve 1
12	(Bulgaria) Gabriela Stoeva (Bulgaria) Stefani Stoeva	49,605	9	Bulgaria (1)	
13	(Indonesia) Della Destiara Haris (Indonesia) Rizki Amelia Pradipta	45,258	10	Indonesia (2)	
14	(Indonesia) Anggia Shitta Awanda (Indonesia) Ni Ketut Mahadewi Istirani	44,304	11	Indonesia (3)	
15	(Thailand) Chayanit Chaladchalam (Thailand) Phataimas Muenwong	42,279	12	Thailand (2)	
16	(South Korea) Kim Hye-rin (South Korea) Yoo Chae-ran	40,390		~~South Korea (3)~~	Decline
17	(South Korea) Chae Yoo-jung (South Korea) Kim So-yeong	39,050		~~South Korea (4)~~	Decline
18	(Malaysia) Chow Mei Kuan (Malaysia) Lee Meng Yean	38,961	13	Malaysia (1)	
19	(Malaysia) Vivian Hoo Kah Mun (Malaysia) Woon Khe Wei	38,397	14	Malaysia (2)	
20	(Australia) Setyana Mapasa (Australia) Gronya Somerville	36,638		~~Australia (1)~~	BO highest ranked, Withdrawn
21	(Russia) Anastasia Chervyakova (Russia) Olga Morozova	36,553		~~Russia (1)~~	Decline
22	(Japan) Naoko Fukuman (Japan) Kurumi Yonao	36,500		Japan (5)	Reserve 2
23	(Denmark) Maiken Fruergaard (Denmark) Sara Thygesen	35,165	15	Denmark (2)	
24	(China) Du Yue (China) Li Yinhui	34,538	16	China (3)	
25	(India) Ashwini Ponnappa (India) N. Sikki Reddy	33,349	17	India (1)	
26	(Chinese Taipei) Hsu Ya-ching (Chinese Taipei) Wu Ti-jung	32,936	18	Chinese Taipei (1)	
27	(England) Lauren Smith (England) Sarah Walker	32,723		~~England (1)~~	Decline
28	(South Korea) Jung Kyung-eun (South Korea) Chang Ye-na	32,700		~~South Korea (5)~~	Reserve 3, Decline
29	(Hong Kong) Poon Lok Yan (Hong Kong) Tse Ying Suet	32,616		~~Hong Kong (1)~~	Decline
30	(Netherlands) Selena Piek (Netherlands) Cheryl Seinen	31,830	19	Netherlands (1)	
31	(Chinese Taipei) Chiang Kai-hsin (Chinese Taipei) Hung Shih-han	30,094	20	Chinese Taipei (2)	
32	(South Korea) Jung Kyung-eun (South Korea) Shin Seung-chan	30,050		~~South Korea (6)~~	Reserve 4, Decline
33	(France) Émilie Lefel (France) Anne Tran	29,859	21	France (1)	
34	(Germany) Isabel Herttrich (Germany) Carla Nelte	29,847	22	Germany (1)	
35	(England) Chloe Birch (England) Jessica Pugh	29,492		~~England (2)~~	Decline
36	(Japan) Ayako Sakuramoto (Japan) Yukiko Takahata	29,320		Japan (6)	Reserve 5
37	(Malaysia) Soong Fie Cho (Malaysia) Tee Jing Yi	28,890		~~Malaysia (3)~~	Reserve 6, Decline
38	(Russia) Ekaterina Bolotova (Russia) Alina Davletova	28,494	23	Russia (2)	
39	(Japan) Misato Aratama (Japan) Akane Watanabe	27,510		Japan (7)	Reserve 7
40	(France) Delphine Delrue (France) Léa Palermo	27,159	24	France (2)	
41	(Germany) Johanna Goliszewski (Germany) Lara Käpplein	27,159	25	Germany (2)	
42	(China) Du Yue (China) Xu Ya	26,650		~~China (4)~~	Reserve 8, Decline
43	(Thailand) Savitree Amitrapai (Thailand) Pacharapun Chochuwong	25,652		~~Thailand (3)~~	Reserve 9, Decline
44	(Denmark) Julie Finne-Ipsen (Denmark) Rikke Søby Hansen	25,610		~~Denmark (3)~~	Reserve 10, Decline
45	(South Korea) Chae Yoo-jung (South Korea) Kim Hye-rin	25,020		~~South Korea (7)~~	Reserve 11, Decline
46	(Malaysia) Lim Yin Loo (Malaysia) Yap Cheng Wen	24,890		~~Malaysia (4)~~	Reserve 12, Decline
47	(South Korea) Baek Ha-na (South Korea) Lee Yu-rim	24,775		~~South Korea (8)~~	Reserve 13, Decline
48	(South Korea) Kim So-yeong (South Korea) Kong Hee-yong	24,660		~~South Korea (9)~~	Reserve 14, Decline
49	(Chinese Taipei) Cheng Yu-chieh (Chinese Taipei) Hu Ling-fang	24,620		~~Chinese Taipei (3)~~	Reserve 15, Decline
50	(Chinese Taipei) Lin Xiao-min (Chinese Taipei) Wu Fang-chien	23,570	40	Chinese Taipei (4)	Reserve 16
51	(India) Meghana Jakkampudi (India) Poorvisha S. Ram	23,290	26	India (2)	
52	(Thailand) Kittipak Dubthuk (Thailand) Natcha Saengchote	22,580		~~Thailand (4)~~	Reserve 17, Decline
53	(Japan) Chisato Hoshi (Japan) Naru Shinoya	22,430		Japan (8)	Reserve 18
54	(Peru) Daniela Macías (Peru) Dánica Nishimura	22,197	27	Peru (1)	BPA highest ranked
55	(Chinese Taipei) Chang Ching-hui (Chinese Taipei) Yang Ching-tun	21,440	41	Chinese Taipei (5)	Reserve 19
56	(China) Huang Dongping (China) Li Wenmei	21,020	42	China (5)	Reserve 20
57	(Japan) Nami Matsuyama (Japan) Chiharu Shida	20,380		Japan (9)	Reserve 21
58	(England) Jenny Moore (England) Victoria Williams	19,870		~~England (3)~~	Decline
59	(Sweden) Emma Karlsson (Sweden) Johanna Magnusson	19,787		~~Sweden (1)~~	Decline
60	(Estonia) Kristin Kuuba (Estonia) Helina Rüütel	19,572		~~Estonia (1)~~	Decline
61	(China) Huang Dongping (China) Li Yinhui	19,140		China (6)	Reserve 22
62	(Scotland) Julie MacPherson (Scotland) Eleanor O'Donnell	19,100		~~Scotland (1)~~	Decline
63	(Denmark) Alexandra Bøje (Denmark) Sara Lundgaard	18,880		~~Denmark (4~~)	Reserve 23, Decline
64	(Indonesia) Agatha Imanuela (Indonesia) Siti Fadia Silva Ramadhanti	18,420	43	Indonesia (4)	Reserve 24
65	(Indonesia) Devi Tika Permatasari (Indonesia) Keshya Nurvita Hanadia	18,360		Indonesia (5)	Reserve 25
66	(Japan) Akane Araki (Japan) Aoi Matsuda	17,930		Japan (10)	Reserve 26
67	(Hong Kong) Ng Tsz Yau (Hong Kong) Yeung Nga Ting	17,788	28	Hong Kong (2)	
68	(Thailand) Ruethaichanok Laisuan (Thailand) Supamart Mingchua	17,610	44	Thailand (5)	Reserve 27
69	(Turkey) Bengisu Erçetin (Turkey) Nazlıcan İnci	17,523	29	Turkey (1)	
70	(Ukraine) Maryna Ilyinskaya (Ukraine) Yelyzaveta Zharka	17,429	30	Ukraine (1)	
71	(Indonesia) Yulfira Barkah (Indonesia) Nitya Krishinda Maheswari	17,380		Indonesia (6)	Reserve 28
72	(Sweden) Amanda Högström (Sweden) Clara Nistad	17,273		~~Sweden (2)~~	Decline
73	(Belgium) Lise Jaques (Belgium) Flore Vandenhoucke	17,010	31	Belgium (1)	
74	(Italy) Silvia Garino (Italy) Lisa Iversen	16,300	32	Italy (1)	
75	(South Korea) Kim Ha-na (South Korea) Kong Hee-yong	16,300		~~South Korea (10)~~	Reserve 29, Decline
76	(India) Sanyogita Ghorpade (India) Prajakta Sawant	16,259	45	India (3)	Reserve 30
77	(China) Tang Jinhua (China) Yu Xiaohan	15,780		China (7)	Reserve 31
78	(South Korea) Kim Hye-rin (South Korea) Lee So-hee	15,670		South Korea (11)	Reserve 32
79	(Singapore) Ong Ren-ne (Singapore) Crystal Wong	15,669		~~Singapore (1)~~	Withdrawn
80	(Singapore) Citra Putri Sari Dewi (Singapore) Jin Yujia	15,600		~~Singapore (2)~~	Decline
81	(Egypt) Doha Hany (Egypt) Hadia Hosny	15,597	33	Egypt (1)	BCA highest ranked
82	(Netherlands) Debora Jille (Netherlands) Imke van der Aar	15,130	34	Netherlands (2)	
83	(United States) Ariel Lee (United States) Sydney Lee	14,870	35	United States (1)	
84	(Belarus) Anastasiya Cherniavskaya (Belarus) Alesia Zaitsava	14,669		~~Belarus (1)~~	Decline
85	(Denmark) Amalie Magelund (Denmark) Freja Ravn	14,420		Denmark (5)	Reserve 33
86	(Thailand) Puttita Supajirakul (Thailand) Sapsiree Taerattanachai	14,406		~~Thailand (6)~~	Reserve 34, Decline
87	(China) Liu Xuanxuan (China) Xia Yuting	13,980		China (8)	Reserve 35
88	(Indonesia) Della Destiara Haris (Indonesia) Rosyita Eka Putri Sari	13,965		Indonesia (7)	Reserve 36
89	(Indonesia) Ririn Amelia (Malaysia) Anna Cheong Ching Yik	13,920		~~Indonesia (7.5)~~; ~~Malaysia (4.5)~~	Reserve 37, Not eligible
90	(Czech Republic) Alžběta Bášová (Czech Republic) Michaela Fuchsová	13,775		~~Czech Republic (1)~~	Decline
91	(Switzerland) Nadia Fankhauser (Netherlands) Iris Tabeling	13,670		~~Switzerland (0.5)~~; ~~Netherlands (2.5)~~	Reserve 38, Decline
92	(Finland) Jenny Nyström (Finland) Sonja Pekkola	13,340		~~Finland (1)~~	Decline
93	(Hong Kong) Ng Wing Yung (Hong Kong) Yuen Sin Ying	13,310	36	Hong Kong (3)	
94	(Russia) Olga Arkhangelskaya (Russia) Natalia Rogova	13,210		~~Russia (3)~~	Decline
95	(Canada) Michelle Tong (Canada) Josephine Wu	12,852	37	Canada (1)	
96	(India) Kuhoo Garg (India) Ningshi Block Hazarika	12,670	46	India (4)	Reserve 39
97	(India) Aparna Balan (India) Sruthi K.P	12,540		India (5)	Reserve 40
98	(Chinese Taipei) Chang Hsin-tien (Chinese Taipei) Yu Chien-hui	12,220		Chinese Taipei (6)	Reserve 41
99	(Germany) Linda Efler (Germany) Olga Konon	12,211		~~Germany (3)~~	Reserve 42, Decline
100	(Germany) Lisa Kaminski (Germany) Hannah Pohl	11,800	47	Germany (4)	Reserve 43
101	(Algeria) Halla Bouksani (Algeria) Linda Mazri	11,685	38	Algeria (1)	
102	(Thailand) Benyapa Aimsaard (Thailand) Nuntakarn Aimsaard	11,340		~~Thailand (7)~~	Reserve 44, Decline
103	(Japan) Rira Kawashima (Japan) Saori Ozaki	11,240		Japan (11)	Reserve 45
104	(Vietnam) Nguyễn Thị Sen (Vietnam) Vũ Thị Trang	10,680		~~Vietnam (1)~~	Decline
105	(Hong Kong) Ng Wing Yung (Hong Kong) Yeung Nga Ting	10,620		~~Hong Kong (4)~~	Reserve 46, Decline
106	(Malaysia) Joyce Choong Wai Chi (Malaysia) Goh Yea Ching	10,560		~~Malaysia (5.5)~~	Reserve 47, Decline
107	(France) Lorraine Baumann (France) Audrey Fontaine	10,420		~~France (3)~~	Reserve 48, Decline
108	(Czech Republic) Tereza Švábíková (Czech Republic) Kateřina Tomalová	10,302		~~Czech Republic (2)~~	Reserve 49, Decline
109	(Indonesia) Tania Oktaviani Kusumah (Indonesia) Vania Arianti Sukoco	10,280		Indonesia (8.5)	Reserve 50
110	(Germany) Linda Efler (Germany) Eva Janssens	9,820	48	Germany (5)	Reserve 51
111	(Australia) Leanne Choo (Australia) Renuga Veeran	9,780		~~Australia (2)~~	Decline
112	(Peru) Ines Castillo (Peru) Paula la Torre Regal	9,660		Peru (2)	
113	(Japan) Erina Honda (Japan) Nozomi Shimizu	9,600		Japan (12)	
114	(India) Harika Veludurthi (India) Karishna Wadkar	9,460		India (6)	
115	(United States) Annie Xu (United States) Kerry Xu	9,339		United States (2)	
116	(Turkey) Büşra Ünlü (Turkey) Ebru Yazgan	9,300		Turkey (2)	
117	(Chinese Taipei) Li Zi-qing (Chinese Taipei) Teng Chun-hsun	9,290		Chinese Taipei (7)	
118	(Indonesia) Dian Fitriani (Indonesia) Nadya Melati	9,260		Indonesia (9.5)	
119	(Malaysia) Chin Kah Mun (Malaysia) Lee Zhi Qing	9,250		Malaysia (6.5)	
120	(Japan) Miki Kashihara (Japan) Miyuki Kato	9,130		Japan (13)	
121	(Lithuania) Vytaute Fomkinaite (Lithuania) Gerda Voitechovskaja	9,103		Lithuania (1)	
122	(Republic of Ireland) Sara Boyle (Republic of Ireland) Rachael Darragh	8,880		Ireland (1)	
123	(Norway) Solvår Flåten Jørgensen (Norway) Natalie Syvertsen	8,859		Norway (1)	
124	(Mauritius) Aurélie Allet (Mauritius) Kobita Dookhee	8,829		Mauritius (1)	
125	(Malaysia) Lim Chiew Sien (Malaysia) Teoh Mei Xing	8,660		Malaysia (7.5)	
126	(Denmark) Julie Dawall Jakobsen (Denmark) Ditte Søby Hansen	8,650		Denmark (6)	
127	(South Korea) Chae Yoo-jung (South Korea) Jung Kyung-eun	8,650		South Korea (12)	
128	(Malaysia) Goh Yea Ching (Malaysia) Yap Cheng Wen	8,630		Malaysia (8.5)	
129	(Slovenia) Iza Šalehar (Slovenia) Lia Šalehar	8,560		Slovenia (1)	
130	(Dominican Republic) Nairoby Abigail Jiménez (Dominican Republic) Licelott Sánchez	8,490		Dominican Republic (1)	
131	(Denmark) Anne Katrine Hansen (Denmark) Marie Louise Steffensen	8,430		Denmark (7)	
132	(New Zealand) Erena Calder-Hawkins (New Zealand) Jasmin Ng Chung Man	8,425		New Zealand (1)	
133	(Japan) Yuho Imai (Japan) Minami Kawashima	8,400		Japan (14)	
134	(Sweden) Clara Nistad (Sweden) Emma Wengberg	8,320		Sweden (3)	
135	(Hong Kong) Ng Tsu Yau (Hong Kong) Yuen Sin Ying	8,300		Hong Kong (5)	
136	(Thailand) Supissara Paewsampran (Thailand) Kwanchanok Sudjaipraparat	8,280		Thailand (8)	
137	(Germany) Isabel Herttrich (Germany) Olga Konon	8,238		Germany (6)	
138	(Hungary) Nikoletta Bukoviczki (Hungary) Daniella Gonda	8,213		Hungary (1)	
139	(South Korea) Chang Ye-na (South Korea) Kim Hye-rin	8,195		South Korea (13)	
140	(Indonesia) Yulfira Barkah (Indonesia) Meirisa Cindy Sahputri	8,180		Indonesia (10.5)	
141	(China) Chen Lu (China) Tang Jinhua	8,170		China (9)	
142	(Latvia) Ieva Pope (Latvia) Monika Radovska	7,930		Latvia (1)	
143	(Japan) Arisa Higashino (Japan) Kie Nakanishi	7,930		Japan (15)	
144	(France) Verlaine Faulmann (France) Margot Lambert	7,920		France (4)	
145	(Turkey) Cemre Fere (Turkey) Özge Bayrak	7,820		Turkey (3)	
146	(Netherlands) Eefje Muskens (Netherlands) Selena Piek	7,770		Netherlands (3.5)	
147	(Dominican Republic) Noemi Almonte (Dominican Republic) Bermary Altagracia Polanco Muñoz	7,740		Dominican Republic (2)	
148	(Indonesia) Febriana Dwipuji Kusuma (Indonesia) Ribka Sugiarto	7,690		Indonesia (11.5)	
149	(Denmark) Isabella Nielsen (Denmark) Claudia Paredes	7,630		Denmark (8)	
150	(Japan) Asumi Kugo (Japan) Megumi Yokoyama	7,600		Japan (16)	

=== Mixed doubles ===
Due to the phase 2 updated by BWF, the following chart is the invitation results.

Players who ranked from 1 to 8, whose association can nominate players for 4.
Players who ranked from 9 to 24, whose association can nominate players for 3.
Players who ranked from 25 to 150, whose association can nominate players for 2.

Rank	Nation / Player	Points	Eligibility		Note
1	(China) Zheng Siwei (China) Chen Qingchen	70,777		~~China (1)~~	BAC highest ranked Zheng Siwei unites with Huang Yaqiong; Decline
2	(China) Wang Yilü (China) Huang Dongping	69,900	1	China (2)	
3	(Indonesia) Tontowi Ahmad (Indonesia) Liliyana Natsir	68,470		~~Indonesia (1)~~	Decline Lilyana Natsir retired
4	(Hong Kong) Tang Chun Man (Hong Kong) Tse Ying Suet	67,488	2	Hong Kong (1)	
5	(Indonesia) Praveen Jordan (Indonesia) Debby Susanto	59,075		~~Indonesia (2)~~	Decline The pair separated
6	(South Korea) Seo Seung-jae (South Korea) Kim Ha-na	58,970		~~South Korea (1)~~	Decline
7	(Malaysia) Goh Soon Huat (Malaysia) Shevon Jemie Lai	55,340	3	Malaysia (1)	
8	(China) Zheng Siwei (China) Huang Yaqiong	54,400	4	China (3)	
9	(England) Chris Adcock (England) Gabby Adcock	51,940	5	England (1)	BE highest ranked
10	(Denmark) Mathias Christiansen (Denmark) Christinna Pedersen	51,030	6	Denmark (1)	
11	(Malaysia) Tan Kian Meng (Malaysia) Lai Pei Jing	48,910	7	Malaysia (2)	
12	(Hong Kong) Lee Chun Hei (Hong Kong) Chau Hoi Wah	45,352	8	Hong Kong (2)	
13	(South Korea) Choi Sol-gyu (South Korea) Chae Yoo-jung	45,306		~~South Korea (2)~~	Decline
14	(China) Lu Kai (China) Huang Yaqiong	43,405		~~China (4)~~	Reserve 1, Decline
15	(China) He Jiting (China) Du Yue	40,690	9	China (5)	
16	(Japan) Kenta Kazuno (Japan) Ayane Kurihara	39,259		~~Japan (1)~~	Retired
17	(Malaysia) Chan Peng Soon (Malaysia) Cheah Yee See	38,690		~~Malaysia (3)~~	Decline
18	(Netherlands) Jacco Arends (Netherlands) Selena Piek	38,490	10	Netherlands (1)	
19	(Germany) Mark Lamsfuß (Germany) Isabel Herttrich	37,941	11	Germany (1)	
20	(Russia) Evgenij Dremin (Russia) Evgenia Dimova	37,940	12	Russia (1)	
21	(India) Pranav Chopra (India) N. Sikki Reddy	37,540	13	India (1)	
22	(Chinese Taipei) Wang Chi-lin (Chinese Taipei) Lee Chia-hsin	37,476	14	Chinese Taipei (1)	
23	(Germany) Marvin Emil Seidel (Germany) Linda Efler	36,920	15	Germany (2)	
24	(France) Ronan Labar (France) Audrey Fontaine	36,880	16	France (1)	
25	(Japan) Yuta Watanabe (Japan) Arisa Higashino	36,436	17	Japan (2)	
26	(England) Marcus Ellis (England) Lauren Smith	35,860	18	England (2)	
27	(England) Ben Lane (England) Jessica Pugh	35,660	38	England (3)	Reserve 2
28	(Thailand) Dechapol Puavaranukroh (Thailand) Sapsiree Taerattanachai	35,519	19	Thailand (1)	
29	(Singapore) Terry Hee Yong Kai (Singapore) Tan Wei Han	35,262		~~Singapore (1)~~	Decline
30	(Indonesia) Hafiz Faizal (Indonesia) Gloria Emanuelle Widjaja	34,750	20	Indonesia (3)	
31	(Denmark) Niclas Nøhr (Denmark) Sara Thygesen	34,070	21	Denmark (2)	
32	(Republic of Ireland) Sam Magee (Republic of Ireland) Chloe Magee	33,230	22	Ireland (1)	
33	(Chinese Taipei) Lee Yang (Chinese Taipei) Hsu Ya-ching	31,910	23	Chinese Taipei (2)	
34	(China) Zhang Nan (China) Li Yinhui	30,710	39	China (6)	Reserve 3
35	(Denmark) Mikkel Mikkelsen (Denmark) Mai Surrow	30,320		~~Denmark (3)~~	Reserve 4, Decline
36	(Japan) Takuro Hoki (Japan) Sayaka Hirota	30,120		~~Japan (3)~~	Retired
37	(Chinese Taipei) Lu Ching-yao (Chinese Taipei) Chiang Kai-hsin	29,940	40	Chinese Taipei (3)	Reserve 6
38	(Netherlands) Robin Tabeling (Netherlands) Cheryl Seinen	29,520	24	Netherlands (2)	
39	(Australia) Sawan Serasinghe (Australia) Setyana Mapasa	29,439		~~Australia (1)~~	BO highest ranked, Decline
40	(Thailand) Nipitphon Phuangphuapet (Thailand) Jongkolphan Kititharakul	28,890		~~Thailand (2)~~	Decline
41	(Denmark) Anders Skaarup Rasmussen (Denmark) Line Kjærsfeldt	28,470		~~Denmark (4)~~	Reserve 7, Decline
42	(South Korea) Kim Won-ho (South Korea) Shin Seung-chan	28,430		~~South Korea (3)~~	Decline
43	(France) Bastian Kersaudy (France) Léa Palermo	27,110	25	France (2)	
44	(Thailand) Tinn Isriyanet (Thailand) Pacharapun Chochuwong	26,970		~~Thailand (3)~~	Reserve 8, Decline
45	(Denmark) Mathias Christiansen (Denmark) Sara Thygesen	26,797		Denmark (5)	Reserve 9
46	(Vietnam) Đỗ Tuấn Đức (Vietnam) Phạm Như Thảo	25,791	26	Vietnam (1)	
47	(Japan) Yugo Kobayashi (Japan) Misaki Matsutomo	25,670	27	Japan (4)	
48	(Chinese Taipei) Liao Min-chun (Chinese Taipei) Chen Hsiao-huan	25,630	41	Chinese Taipei (4)	Reserve 10
49	(Thailand) Bodin Issara (Thailand) Savitree Amitrapai	25,532		~~Thailand (4)~~	Reserve 11, Decline
50	(Russia) Vitalij Durkin (Russia) Nina Vislova	24,780		~~Russia (2)~~	Decline
51	(Malaysia) Yogendran Khrishnan (India) Prajakta Sawant	24,600		~~Malaysia (3.5)~~; ~~India (1.5)~~	Reserve 12, Decline
52	(Thailand) Dechapol Puavaranukroh (Thailand) Puttita Supajirakul	23,790		~~Thailand (5)~~	Reserve 13, Decline
53	(India) Satwiksairaj Rankireddy (India) Ashwini Ponnappa	22,757	28	India (2.5)	
54	(Chinese Taipei) Tseng Min-hao (Chinese Taipei) Hu Ling-fang	22,600		Chinese Taipei (5)	Reserve 14
55	(England) Gregory Mairs (England) Jenny Moore	22,360		~~England (4)~~	Reserve 15, Decline
56	(Denmark) Joachim Fischer Nielsen (Denmark) Christinna Pedersen	22,292		~~Denmark (6)~~	Reserve 16, Decline
57	(Indonesia) Praveen Jordan (Indonesia) Melati Daeva Oktavianti	21,670	29	Indonesia (4)	
58	(Netherlands) Jelle Maas (Netherlands) Imke van der Aar	21,060		~~Netherlands (3)~~	Reserve 17, Decline
59	(Malaysia) Chan Peng Soon (Malaysia) Goh Liu Ying	20,730	42	Malaysia (4.5)	Reserve 18
60	(India) Saurabh Sharma (India) Anoushka Parikh	20,350	43	India (3.5)	Reserve 19
61	(Indonesia) Ronald Alexander (Indonesia) Annisa Saufika	20,260	44	Indonesia (5)	Reserve 20
62	(Finland) Anton Kaisti (Finland) Jenny Nyström	20,020		~~Finland (1)~~	Decline
63	(Singapore) Danny Bawa Chrisnanta (Singapore) Crystal Wong	19,700		~~Singapore (2)~~	Withdrawn
64	(Russia) Rodion Alimov (Russia) Alina Davletova	19,300	30	Russia (3)	
65	(Germany) Peter Käsbauer (Germany) Olga Konon	19,250	45	Germany (3)	Reserve 21
66	(Denmark) Kristoffer Knudsen (Denmark) Isabella Nielsen	18,750		~~Denmark (7)~~	Reserve 22, Decline
67	(India) Rohan Kapoor (India) Kuhoo Garg	18,730	46	India (4.5)	Reserve 23
68	(France) Thom Gicquel (France) Delphine Delrue	18,430	47	France (3)	Reserve 24
69	(Indonesia) Yantoni Edy Saputra (Indonesia) Marsheilla Gischa Islami	18,190	48	Indonesia (6)	Reserve 25
70	(Indonesia) Andika Ramadiansyah (Indonesia) Mychelle Crhystine Bandaso	17,970		Indonesia (7)	Reserve 26
71	(Indonesia) Lukhi Apri Nugroho (Indonesia) Ririn Amelia	17,790		Indonesia (8)	Reserve 27
72	(Switzerland) Oliver Schaller (Switzerland) Céline Burkart	17,730	31	Switzerland (1)	
73	(Malaysia) Hoo Pang Ron (Malaysia) Peck Yen Wei	17,560		Malaysia (5.5)	Reserve 28
74	(Malaysia) Mohamad Arif Abdul Latif (Indonesia) Rusydina Antardayu Riodingin	17,440		Malaysia (6); Indonesia (8.5)	Reserve 29
75	(Chinese Taipei) Chang Ko-chi (Chinese Taipei) Cheng Chi-ya	17,150		Chinese Taipei (6)	Reserve 30
76	(China) Zhang Nan (China) Liu Xuanxuan	16,910		China (7)	Reserve 31
77	(Czech Republic) Jakub Bitman (Czech Republic) Alžběta Bášová	16,430	32	Czech Republic (1)	
78	(Cuba) Leodannis Martínez (Cuba) Tahimara Oropeza	16,210		~~Cuba (1)~~	BPA highest ranked, Decline
79	(South Korea) Kim Jae-hwan (South Korea) Lee So-hee	16,130		~~South Korea (4)~~	Reserve 32, Decline
80	(Indonesia) Alfian Eko Prasetya (Indonesia) Melati Daeva Oktavianti	15,670		Indonesia (9.5)	Reserve 33
81	(Indonesia) Fachryza Abimanyu (Indonesia) Bunga Fitriani Romadhini	14,780		Indonesia (10.5)	Reserve 34
82	(Indonesia) Akbar Bintang Cahyono (Indonesia) Winny Oktavina Kandow	14,520		Indonesia (11.5)	Reserve 35
83	(Sweden) Nico Ruponen (Sweden) Amanda Högström	14,270		~~Sweden (1)~~	Decline
84	(Bulgaria) Alex Vlaar (Netherlands) Iris Tabeling	14,160		Bulgaria (0.5); Netherlands (3.5)	Reserve 36
85	(Hong Kong) Tam Chun Hei (Hong Kong) Ng Tsz Yau	13,990		Hong Kong (3)	Reserve 37
86	(Peru) Daniel la Torre Regal (Peru) Dánica Nishimura	13,960		~~Peru (1)~~	Decline
87	(Hong Kong) Chang Tak Ching (Hong Kong) Ng Wing Yung	13,950		Hong Kong (4)	Reserve 38
88	(Malaysia) Chen Tang Jie (Malaysia) Peck Yen Wei	13,930		Malaysia (7)	Reserve 39
89	(Sweden) Richard Eidestedt (Sweden) Clara Nistad	13,580		~~Sweden (2)~~	Decline
90	(France) Jordan Corvée (France) Anne Tran	12,820		France (4)	Reserve 40
91	(Indonesia) Yehezkiel Fritz Mainaky (Indonesia) Lyanny Alessandra Mainaky	12,560		Indonesia (12.5)	Reserve 41
92	(Indonesia) Riky Widianto (Indonesia) Masita Mahmudin	12,330		Indonesia (13.5)	Reserve 42
93	(Chinese Taipei) Yang Ming-tse (Chinese Taipei) Sung Shuo-yun	12,010		Chinese Taipei (7)	Reserve 43
94	(Germany) Andreas Heinz (Germany) Annika Horbach	11,250		Germany (4)	Reserve 44
95	(Canada) Toby Ng (Canada) Rachel Honderich	11,290	33	Canada (1)	
96	(Japan) Yuki Kaneko (Japan) Koharu Yonemoto	11,190		Japan (5)	Reserve 45
97	(Japan) Kohei Gondo (Japan) Wakana Nagahara	10,970		Japan (6)	Reserve 46
98	(United States) Mathew Fogarty (United States) Isabel Zhong	10,780	34	United States (1)	
99	(Hong Kong) Mak Hee Chun (Hong Kong) Yeung Nga Ting	10,760		Hong Kong (5)	Reserve 47
100	(Scotland) Alexander Dunn (Scotland) Eleanor O'Donnell	10,630		~~Scotland (1)~~	Decline
101	(Chinese Taipei) Wu Yuan-cheng (Chinese Taipei) Yang Ching-tun	10,520		Chinese Taipei (8)	Reserve 48
102	(Hong Kong) Ho Wai Lun (Hong Kong) Yuen Sin Ying	10,360		Hong Kong (6)	Reserve 49
103	(Denmark) Mikkel Stoffersen (Denmark) Susan Ekelund	10,300		Denmark (8)	Reserve 50
104	(Canada) Nyl Yakura (Canada) Brittney Tam	10,285		~~Canada (2)~~	Decline
105	(Singapore) Bimo Adi Prakoso (Singapore) Jin Yujia	10,120		~~Singapore (3)~~	Decline
106	(Denmark) Mathias Bay-Smidt (Denmark) Alexandra Bøje	10,080		Denmark (9)	
107	(England) Michael Roe (England) Jessica Hopton	10,020		England (5)	
108	(India) Vighnesh Devlekar (India) Harika Veludurthi	9,980		India (5.5)	
109	(Bulgaria) Dimitar Yanakiev (Bulgaria) Mariya Mitsova	9,790	35	Bulgaria (1.5)	
110	(Indonesia) Rehan Naufal Kusharjanto (Indonesia) Siti Fadia Silva Ramadhanti	9,780		Indonesia (14.5)	
111	(Indonesia) Ricky Karanda Suwardi (Indonesia) Debby Susanto	9,420		Indonesia (15.5)	
112	(New Zealand) Oliver Leydon-Davis (New Zealand) Susannah Leydon-Davis	9,342		~~New Zealand (1)~~	Decline
113	(Chinese Taipei) Po Li-wei (Chinese Taipei) Chang Ching-hui	9,330		Chinese Taipei (9)	
114	(Malaysia) Chen Tang Jie (Malaysia) Tew Jia Jia	9,190		Malaysia (8)	
115	(England) Matthew Clare (England) Victoria Williams	9,170		England (6)	
116	(India) Nandagopal Kidambi (India) Mahima Aggarwal	9,120		India (6.5)	
117	(Norway) Fredrik Kristensen (Norway) Solvår Flåten Jørgensen	9,110	36	Norway (1)	
118	(Singapore) Jason Wong Guang Liang (Singapore) Citra Putri Sari Dewi	9,090		Singapore (4)	
119	(South Korea) Kim Duk-young (South Korea) Kim Ha-na	9,080		South Korea (5)	
120	(Chinese Taipei) Ye Hong-wei (Chinese Taipei) Teng Chun-hsun	9,000		Chinese Taipei (10)	
121	(Chinese Taipei) Chang Ko-chi (Chinese Taipei) Chang Hsin-tien	9,000		Chinese Taipei (11)	
122	(Austria) Dominik Stipsits (Austria) Antonia Meinke	8,830		~~Austria (1)~~	Decline
123	(Israel) Misha Zilberman (Israel) Svetlana Zilberman	8,630		Israel (1)	
124	(Republic of Ireland) Scott Evans (Sweden) Amanda Högström	8,370		Ireland (1.5); Sweden (2.5)	
125	(Czech Republic) Filip Budzel (Czech Republic) Tereza Švábíková	8,350		Czech Republic (2)	
126	(Poland) Paweł Śmiłowski (Poland) Magdalena Świerczyńska	8,330		Poland (1)	
127	(Japan) Tomoya Takashina (Japan) Rie Eto	8,310		Japan (7)	
128	(China) Guo Xinwa (China) Liu Xuanxuan	8,300		China (8)	
129	(Malaysia) Lim Zhen Ting (Malaysia) Chin Kah Mun	8,270		Malaysia (9)	
130	(Scotland) Adam Hall (Scotland) Ciara Torrance	8,260		Scotland (2)	
131	(Indonesia) Irfan Fadhilah (Indonesia) Weni Anggraini	8,240		Indonesia (16.5)	
132	(India) Venkat Gaurav Prasad (India) Juhi Dewangan	8,150		India (7.5)	
133	(Poland) Paweł Pietryja (Poland) Aneta Wojtkowska	8,070		Poland (2)	
134	(Indonesia) Rinov Rivaldy (Indonesia) Angelica Wiratama	8,070		Indonesia (17.5)	
135	(Indonesia) Rinov Rivaldy (Indonesia) Pitha Haningtyas Mentari	8,030		Indonesia (18.5)	
136	(China) Zhou Haodong (China) Xu Ya	7,880		China (9)	
137	(Indonesia) Alfian Eko Prasetya (Indonesia) Marsheilla Gischa Islami	7,850		Indonesia (19.5)	
138	(Nigeria) Enejoh Abah (Nigeria) Peace Orji	7,720	37	Nigeria (1)	BCA highest ranked
139	(Malaysia) Ahmad Maziri Mazlan (Malaysia) Payee Lim Peiy Yee	7,710		Malaysia (10)	
140	(Malaysia) Chan Peng Soon (Malaysia) Peck Yen Wei	7,700		Malaysia (11)	
140	(China) Liu Yuchen (China) Tang Jinhua	7,700		China (10)	
142	(Denmark) Alexander Bond (Denmark) Ditte Søby Hansen	7,660		Denmark (10)	
143	(Russia) Alexandr Zinchenko (Russia) Olga Morozova	7,480		Russia (4)	
144	(Czech Republic) Jaromír Janáček (Czech Republic) Sabina Milova	7,430		Czech Republic (3)	
145	(South Korea) Kim Won-ho (South Korea) Lee Yu-rim	7,340		South Korea (6)	
146	(Slovakia) Milan Dratva (Slovakia) Martina Repiská	7,330		Slovakia (1)	
147	(Poland) Miłosz Bochat (Poland) Aneta Wojtkowska	7,290		Poland (3)	
148	(Thailand) Natchanon Tulamok (Thailand) Natcha Saengchote	7,220		Thailand (6)	
149	(Germany) Jonathan Persson (Mauritius) Kate Foo Kune	7,130		Germany (4.5); Mauritius (0.5)	
150	(Ukraine) Artem Pochtarov (Ukraine) Natalya Voytsekh	7,060		Ukraine (1)	
