= Camilla Martens =

Danish badminton player (born 1989)

Personal information
- Born: 23 October 1989 (age 37)

Sport
- Country: Denmark
- Sport: Badminton

Women's Singles & Women's Doubles
- Highest ranking: 152 (WS) 12 May 2011; 158 (WD) 25 Apr 2013
- BWF profile

Camilla Martens (born 23 October 1989) is a Danish female badminton player.

== Achievements ==
=== BWF International Challenge/Series ===
Women's Doubles
Year	Tournament	Partner	Opponent	Score	Result
2015	Finnish International	(Slovakia) Martina Repiska	(Denmark) Irina Amalie Andersen (Denmark) Julie Dawall Jakobsen	8-11, 11–7, 3–11, 9–11	(silver) Runner-up
2015	Croatian International	(Denmark) Maiken Fruergaard	(Denmark) Julie Finne-Ipsen (Denmark) Ditte Soby Hansen	21–16, 19–21, 21–19	(gold) Winner

BWF International Challenge tournament
BWF International Series tournament
BWF Future Series tournament
