= Finnish International =

Finnish International may refer to:

- Arctic Open, known as Finnish International from 1990 to 2013, a badminton tournament held in Finland
- Finnish International (badminton), held since 2014
