= Josephine van Zaane =

Danish badminton player (born 1993)

Personal information
- Born: 8 January 1993 (age 33)

Sport
- Country: Denmark
- Sport: Badminton

Women's singles & doubles
- Highest ranking: 283 (WS 4 October 2012); 88 (WD 25 October 2012); 261 (XD 28 April 2016)
- BWF profile

Josephine van Zaane (born 8 January 1993) is a Danish badminton player.

== Achievements ==
=== BWF International Challenge/Series ===
Women's doubles
Year	Tournament	Partner	Opponent	Score	Result
2013	Hungarian International	(Denmark) Celine Juel	(Russia) Olga Golovanova (Russia) Viktoriia Vorobeva	17–21, 21–19, 11–21	(silver) Runner-up
2014	Hungarian International	(Sweden) Emma Wengberg	(Malaysia) Cheah Yee See (Malaysia) Goh Yea Ching	4–11, 10–11, 10–11	(silver) Runner-up

Mixed doubles
Year	Tournament	Partner	Opponent	Score	Result
2010	Iceland International	(Denmark) Kasper Paulsen	(Denmark) Frederik Colberg (Denmark) Mette Poulsen	17–21, 21–8, 16–21	(silver) Runner-up

BWF International Challenge tournament
BWF International Series tournament
BWF Future Series tournament
