= Sofie Holmboe Dahl =

Danish badminton player (born 1996)

Personal information
- Born: 1 November 1996 (age 30)

Sport
- Country: Denmark
- Sport: Badminton

Women's singles
- Highest ranking: 50 (21 December 2017)
- Current ranking: 1050 (14 May 2019)
- BWF profile
Medal record
Women's badminton
Representing Denmark
European Women's Team Championships
Gold medal – first place	2018 Kazan	Women's team

Sofie Holmboe Dahl (born 1 November 1996) is a Danish badminton player. She won her first title at the 2015 Norwegian International Series tournament in the women's singles event.

== Achievements ==
=== BWF International Challenge/Series ===
Women's singles
Year	Tournament	Opponent	Score	Result
2019	Slovenian International	(Spain) Clara Azurmendi	21–14, 17–21, 18–21	(silver) Runner-up
2017	Swedish International	(Denmark) Mia Blichfeldt	19–21, 16–21	(silver) Runner-up
2016	Finnish International	(Denmark) Irina Amalie Andersen	11–5, 8–11, 11–7, 6–11, 7–11	(silver) Runner-up
2016	Hungarian International	(Malaysia) Yap Rui Chen	12–14, 5–11, 11–6, 8–11	(silver) Runner-up
2016	Belgian International	(Malaysia) Sonia Cheah Su Ya	11–21, 21–16, 16–21	(silver) Runner-up
2016	Slovenia International	(Denmark) Julie Dawall Jakobsen	15–21, 7–21	(silver) Runner-up
2015	Finnish International	(Indonesia) Febby Angguni	21–18, 10–21, 8–21	(silver) Runner-up
2015	Norwegian International	(Estonia) Kati Tolmoff	21–13, 21–12	(gold) Winner

BWF International Challenge tournament
BWF International Series tournament
BWF Future Series tournament
