= Philip Seerup =

Danish badminton player (born 1997)

Personal information
- Born: 12 September 1997 (age 29)

Sport
- Country: Denmark
- Sport: Badminton

Men's & mixed doubles
- Highest ranking: 234 (MD 19 November 2015); 281 (XD 3 December 2015)
- BWF profile

Philip Seerup (born 12 September 1997) is a Danish badminton player.

== Achievements ==
=== BWF International Challenge/Series ===
Men's doubles
| Year | Tournament | Partner | Opponent | Score | Result |
|---|---|---|---|---|---|
| 2017 | Hungarian International | (Denmark) Joel Eipe | (Denmark) Frederik Colberg (Denmark) Rasmus Fladberg | | (silver) Runner-up |
| 2017 | Norwegian International | (Denmark) Joel Eipe | (England) Matthew Clare (England) David King | 21–8, 18–21, 21–19 | (gold) Winner |

Mixed doubles
| Year | Tournament | Partner | Opponent | Score | Result |
|---|---|---|---|---|---|
| 2016 | Finnish International | (Denmark) Irina Amalie Andersen | (Finland) Anton Kaisti (Finland) Jenny Nyström | | (silver) Runner-up |

BWF International Challenge tournament
BWF International Series tournament
BWF Future Series tournament
