= Emma Wengberg =

Swedish badminton player

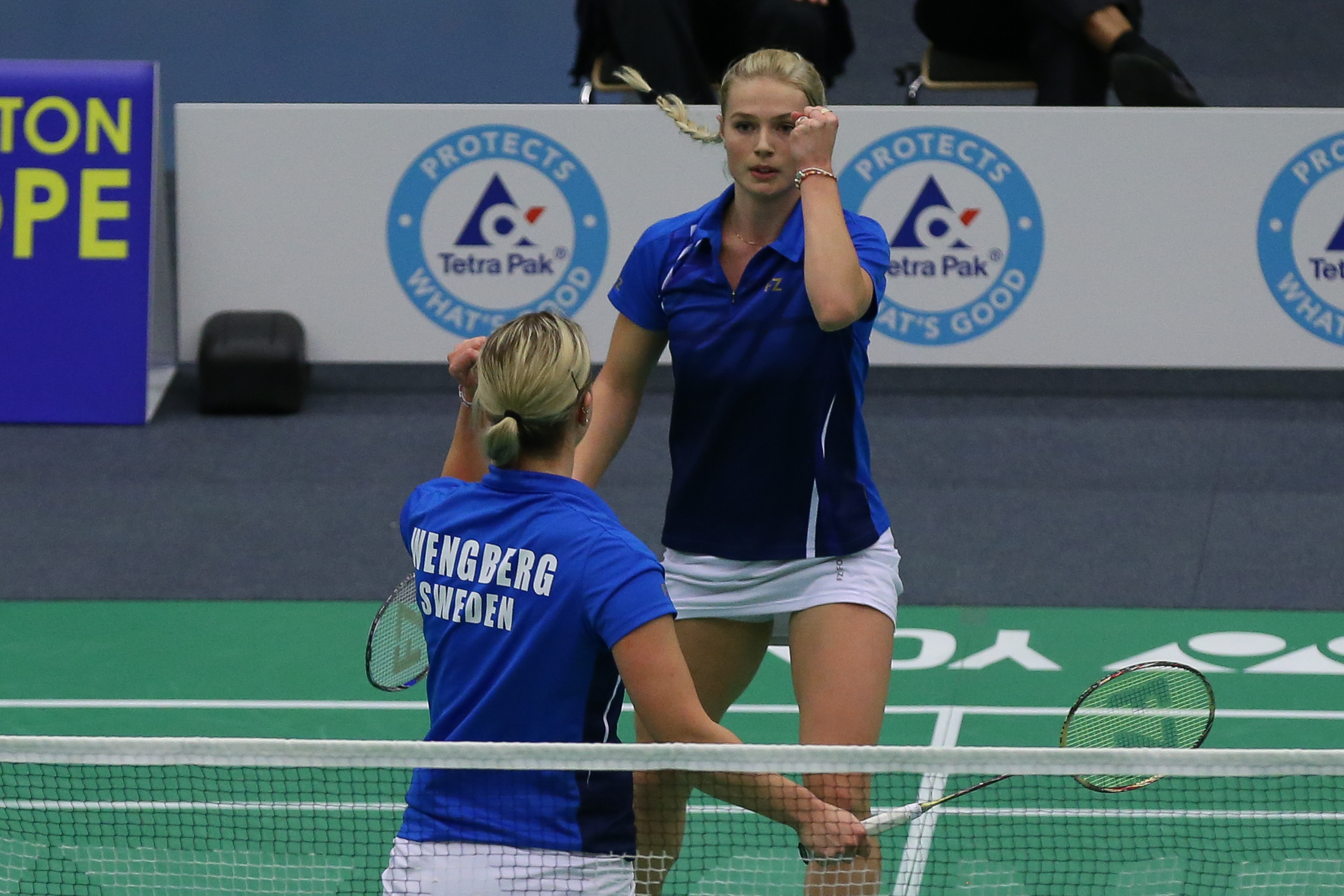
- Wengberg with Nistad in 2017

Personal information
- Born: 28 November 1987 (age 38)

Sport
- Country: Sweden
- Sport: Badminton

Women's & mixed doubles
- Highest ranking: 21 (WD 19 May 2011); 78 (XD 11 February 2016)
- BWF profile

Emma Wengberg (born 28 November 1987) is a Swedish badminton player affiliated with Västra Frölunda BK. In 2009, she won the Turkey International tournament in the women's doubles event partnered with Emelie Lennartsson. In 2011, she and Lennartsson also won the Scottish International tournament. In 2014, she won the Norwegian International tournament in the women's doubles event with Tilde Iversen of Denmark. In 2015, she won the Portugal and Finnish International tournaments in the mixed doubles event partnered with Filip Michael Duwall Myhren, and also won the women's doubles title at the Finland partnered with Clara Nistad. In March 2015, she and Nistad won the Polish International tournament after beat the English pair Chloe Birch and Jessica Pugh. In 2017, she won the women's doubles title at the Swedish International Series tournament with Nistad.

== Achievements ==
=== BWF Grand Prix ===
The BWF Grand Prix had two levels, the Grand Prix and Grand Prix Gold. It was a series of badminton tournaments sanctioned by the Badminton World Federation (BWF) and played between 2007 and 2017.

Women's doubles
Year	Tournament	Partner	Opponent	Score	Result
2011	Bitburger Open	(Sweden) Emelie Lennartsson	(Japan) Mizuki Fujii (Japan) Reika Kakiiwa	8–21, 11–21	(silver) Runner-up

BWF Grand Prix Gold tournament
BWF Grand Prix tournament

=== BWF International Challenge/Series ===
Women's doubles
Year	Tournament	Partner	Opponent	Score	Result
2008	Slovenian International	(Sweden) Emelie Lennartsson	(Germany) Claudia Vogelgsang (Finland) Nina Weckström	21–9, 21–11	(gold) Winner
2008	Bulgarian International	(Sweden) Emelie Lennartsson	(Russia) Valeria Sorokina (Russia) Nina Vislova	16–21, 6–21	(silver) Runner-up
2008	Norwegian International	(Sweden) Emelie Lennartsson	(Russia) Irina Khlebko (Russia) Anastasia Russkikh	18–21, 23–21, 16–21	(silver) Runner-up
2008	Scotland International	(Sweden) Emelie Lennartsson	(England) Mariana Agathangelou (Scotland) Jillie Cooper	17–21, 13–21	(silver) Runner-up
2008	Italian International	(Sweden) Emelie Lennartsson	(Russia) Valeria Sorokina (Russia) Nina Vislova	21–23, 14–21	(silver) Runner-up
2009	Swedish International	(Sweden) Emelie Lennartsson	(Netherlands) Rachel van Cutsen (Netherlands) Paulien van Dooremalen	22–20, 19–21, 20–22	(silver) Runner-up
2009	Portugal International	(Sweden) Emelie Lennartsson	(Finland) Sanni Rautala (Finland) Noora Virta	21–10, 20–22, 21–12	(gold) Winner
2009	Turkey International	(Sweden) Emelie Lennartsson	(Turkey) Özge Bayrak (Turkey) Li Shuang	21–11, 21–9	(gold) Winner
2010	Spanish Open	(Sweden) Emelie Lennartsson	(Netherlands) Lotte Jonathans (Netherlands) Paulien van Dooremalen	21–16, 21–19	(gold) Winner
2011	Scottish International	(Sweden) Emelie Lennartsson	(Malaysia) Ng Hui Ern (Malaysia) Ng Hui Lin	21–7, 21–13	(gold) Winner
2013	Swedish Masters	(Sweden) Emelie Lennartsson	(Netherlands) Selena Piek (Netherlands) Iris Tabeling	15–21, 16–21	(silver) Runner-up
2013	Denmark International	(Sweden) Emelie Lennartsson	(Denmark) Line Damkjær Kruse (Denmark) Marie Røpke	20–22, 11–21	(silver) Runner-up
2013	Swiss International	(Sweden) Emelie Lennartsson	(Russia) Anastasia Chervaykova (Russia) Nina Vislova	18–21, 21–18, 13–21	(silver) Runner-up
2014	Hungarian International	(Denmark) Josephine van Zaane	(Malaysia) Cheah Yee See (Malaysia) Goh Yea Ching	4–11, 10–11, 10–11	(silver) Runner-up
2014	Norwegian International	(Denmark) Tilde Iversen	(Poland) Magdalena Witek (Poland) Aneta Wojtkowska	21–13, 21–15	(gold) Winner
2015	Polish International	(Sweden) Clara Nistad	(England) Chloe Birch (England) Jessica Pugh	21–16, 6–21, 21–15	(gold) Winner
2015	Finnish International	(Sweden) Clara Nistad	(Netherlands) Alida Chen (Netherlands) Cheryl Seinen	21–16, 22–20	(gold) Winner
2017	Swedish International	(Sweden) Clara Nistad	(Denmark) Alexandra Bøje (Denmark) Lena Grebak	21–17, 24–22	(gold) Winner

Mixed doubles
Year	Tournament	Partner	Opponent	Score	Result
2014	Norwegian International	(Sweden) Filip Michael Duwall Myhren	(Finland) Anton Kaisti (Netherlands) Cheryl Seinen	15–21, 21–17, 14–21	(silver) Runner-up
2015	Portugal International	(Sweden) Filip Michael Duwall Myhren	(Finland) Marko Pyykönen (Estonia) Karoliine Hõim	21–15, 21–18	(gold) Winner
2015	Finnish International	(Sweden) Filip Michael Duwall Myhren	(Denmark) Kristoffer Knudsen (Denmark) Emilie Juul Møller	13–21, 22–20, 21–15	(gold) Winner

BWF International Challenge tournament
BWF International Series tournament
BWF Future Series tournament
