= Irina Amalie Andersen =

Danish badminton player (born 1998)

Personal information
- Born: 15 October 1998 (age 28) Roskilde, Denmark
- Height: 1.72 m (5 ft 8 in)

Sport
- Country: Denmark
- Sport: Badminton
- Handedness: Left

Women's singles & doubles
- Highest ranking: 73 (WS 9 November 2017); 132 (WD with Julie Dawall Jakobsen 1 December 2016); 213 (XD with Philip Seerup 21 September 2017)
- BWF profile
Medal record
Women's badminton
Representing Denmark
European Junior Championships
Bronze medal – third place	2015 Lubin	Mixed team
Bronze medal – third place	2017 Mulhouse	Girls' singles
Bronze medal – third place	2017 Mulhouse	Mixed team

Irina Amalie Andersen (born 15 October 1998) is a Danish badminton player. Born in Roskilde, Andersen trained at the Lillerød badminton club. She made her international debut in 2013, later entered the Badminton Europe Centre of Excellence (CoE) in May 2019. At the 2016 Finnish International tournament, she claimed two titles after won the women's singles and doubles events.

== Achievements ==
=== European Junior Championships ===
Girls' singles
Year	Venue	Opponent	Score	Result
2017	Centre Sportif Régional d'Alsace; Mulhouse, France	(Ukraine) Maryna Ilyinskaya	21–14, 21–23, 18–21	Bronze

=== BWF International Challenge/Series (5 titles, 4 runners-up) ===
Women's singles
Year	Tournament	Opponent	Score	Result
2016	Lithuanian International	(Russia) Elena Komendrovskaja	12–21, 13–21	(silver) Runner-up
2016	Finnish International	(Denmark) Sofie Holmboe Dahl	5–11, 11–8, 7–11, 11–6, 11–7	(gold) Winner
2017	Dutch International	(Germany) Luise Heim	18–21, 24–22, 21–18	(gold) Winner
2019	Polish International	(Wales) Jordan Hart	21–18, 13–21, 13–21	(silver) Runner-up
2023	Latvia International	(Switzerland) Dounia Pelupessy	21–15, 11–21, 21–12	(gold) Winner
2023	Norwegian International	(Canada) Talia Ng	10–21, 21–12, 17–21	(silver) Runner-up

Women's doubles
Year	Tournament	Partner	Opponent	Score	Result
2016	Finnish International	(Denmark) Julie Dawall Jakobsen	(Denmark) Camilla Martens (Slovakia) Martina Repiská	11–8, 7–11, 11–3, 11–9	(gold) Winner

Mixed doubles
Year	Tournament	Partner	Opponent	Score	Result
2016	Finnish International	(Denmark) Philip Seerup	(Finland) Anton Kaisti (Finland) Jenny Nyström	6–11, 14–12, 7–11, 13–15	(silver) Runner-up
2019	Kazakhstan International	(Denmark) Jeppe Bruun	(Kazakhstan) Artur Niyazov (Russia) Olga Ivashchenko	21–17, 21–13	(gold) Winner

BWF International Challenge tournament
BWF International Series tournament
BWF Future Series tournament
