= Julie Dawall Jakobsen =

Danish badminton player (born 1998)

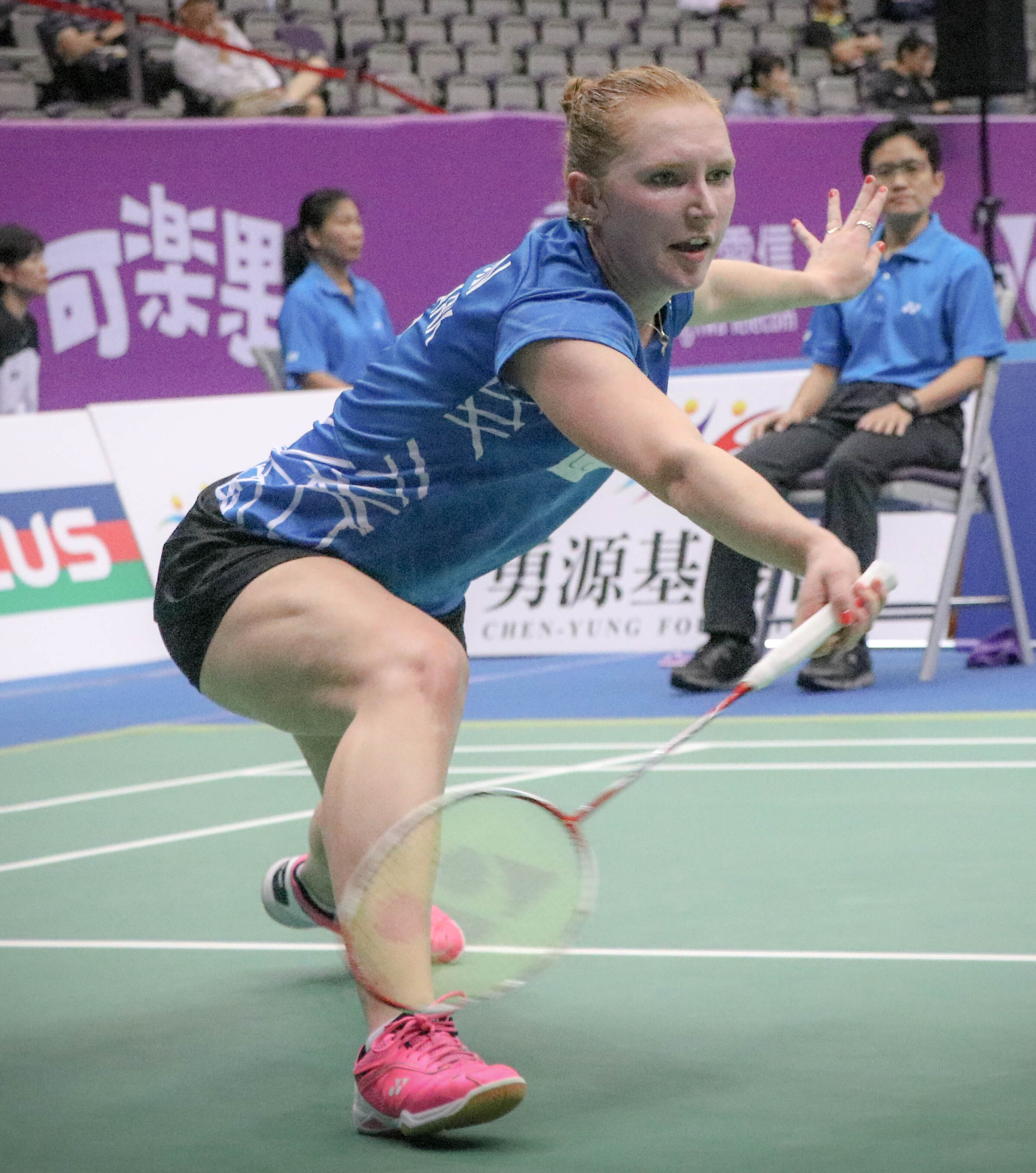
- Jakobsen at the 2018 Chinese Taipei Open

Personal information
- Born: 25 March 1998 (age 28) Copenhagen, Denmark
- Years active: 2014–present
- Height: 1.71 m (5 ft 7 in)

Sport
- Country: Denmark
- Sport: Badminton
- Handedness: Right

Women's singles & doubles
- Highest ranking: 29 (WS, 25 March 2025); 82 (WD, 20 April 2017)
- Current ranking: 50 (WS, 9 June 2026)
- BWF profile
Medal record
Women's badminton
Representing Denmark
European Championships
Bronze medal – third place	2024 Saarbrücken	Women's singles
Bronze medal – third place	2025 Horsens	Women's singles
European Mixed Team Championships
Gold medal – first place	2017 Lubin	Mixed team
Gold medal – first place	2019 Copenhagen	Mixed team
Gold medal – first place	2025 Baku	Mixed team
European Women's Team Championships
Gold medal – first place	2016 Kazan	Women's team
Gold medal – first place	2018 Kazan	Women's team
Gold medal – first place	2020 Liévin	Women's team
Gold medal – first place	2024 Łódź	Women's team
Silver medal – second place	2026 Istanbul	Women's team
European Junior Championships
Gold medal – first place	2015 Lubin	Girls' doubles
Gold medal – first place	2017 Mulhouse	Girls' singles
Silver medal – second place	2015 Lubin	Girls' singles
Silver medal – second place	2017 Mulhouse	Girls' doubles
Bronze medal – third place	2015 Lubin	Mixed team
Bronze medal – third place	2017 Mulhouse	Mixed team

Julie Dawall Jakobsen (born 25 March 1998) is a Danish badminton player. She was the bronze medalists in the 2024 and 2025 European Championships. In her junior, Jakobsen won the gold medals in the girls' doubles at the 2015 European Junior Championships and in the girls' singles event in 2017.

== Achievements ==
=== European Championships ===
Women's singles
Year	Venue	Opponent	Score	Result	Ref.
2024	Saarlandhalle; Saarbrücken, Germany	(Spain) Carolina Marin	16–21, 7–21	Bronze	
2025	Forum; Horsens, Denmark	(Denmark) Line Kjærsfeldt	15–21, 9–21	Bronze	

=== European Junior Championships ===
Girls' singles
Year	Venue	Opponent	Score	Result
2015	Regional Sport Centrum Hall; Lubin, Poland	(Denmark) Mia Blichfeldt	14–21, 10–21	Silver
2017	Centre Sportif Régional d'Alsace; Mulhouse, France	(Ukraine) Maryna Ilyinskaya	21–8, 21–17	Gold

Girls' doubles
Year	Venue	Partner	Opponent	Score	Result
2015	Regional Sport Centrum Hall; Lubin, Poland	(Denmark) Ditte Søby Hansen	(France) Verlaine Faulmann (France) Anne Tran	2–18, 21–19	Gold
2017	Centre Sportif Régional d'Alsace; Mulhouse, France	(Denmark) Alexandra Bøje	(Sweden) Emma Karlsson (Sweden) Johanna Magnusson	14–21, 14–21	Silver

=== BWF International Challenge/Series (9 titles, 5 runners-up) ===
Women's singles
Year	Tournament	Opponent	Score	Result
2016	Iceland International	(Finland) Airi Mikkelä	19–21, 21–15, 21–16	(gold) Winner
2016	Slovenian International	(Denmark) Sofie Holmboe Dahl	21–15, 21–7	(gold) Winner
2016	Bulgaria International	(Spain) Clara Azurmendi	24–26, 11–21	(silver) Runner-up
2017	Slovenian International	(China) Qi Xuefei	21–19, 21–14	(gold) Winner
2018	Swedish Open	(Denmark) Michelle Skødstrup	13–21, 21–12, 19–21	(silver) Runner-up
2018	Dutch International	(Malaysia) Thinaah Muralitharan	17–21, 21–15, 21–11	(gold) Winner
2018	Italian International	(Germany) Yvonne Li	21–17, 21–17	(gold) Winner
2019	Finnish Open	(Thailand) Porntip Buranaprasertsuk	21–18, 23–21	(gold) Winner
2019	Irish Open	(France) Qi Xuefei	15–21, 12–21	(silver) Runner-up
2021	Denmark Masters	(Denmark) Line Christophersen	11–21, 17–21	(silver) Runner-up
2021	Welsh International	(Chinese Taipei) Hsu Wen-chi	21–23, 11–21	(silver) Runner-up
2023	Dutch Open	(India) Samiya Imad Farooqui	21–11, 21–7	(gold) Winner
2024	Scottish Open	(Chinese Taipei) Huang Ching-ping	21–19, 21–16	(gold) Winner

Women's doubles
Year	Tournament	Partner	Opponent	Score	Result
2016	Finnish International	(Denmark) Irina Amalie Andersen	(Denmark) Camilla Martens (Slovakia) Martina Repiská	11–8, 7–11, 11–3, 11–9	(gold) Winner

BWF International Challenge tournament
BWF International Series tournament
BWF Future Series tournament
