= Anton Kaisti =

Finnish badminton player (born 1992)

Personal information
- Born: 17 May 1992 (age 34) Helsinki, Finland
- Height: 1.92 m (6 ft 4 in)

Sport
- Country: Finland
- Sport: Badminton
- Handedness: Right

Men's singles & doubles
- Highest ranking: 139 (MS 20 April 2017); 101 (MD 15 January 2015); 43 (XD 16 November 2017)
- Current ranking: 144 (MD), 77 (XD) (29 November 2022)
- BWF profile
Medal record
Men's badminton
Representing Finland
European Men's Team Championships
Bronze medal – third place	2014 Basel	Men's team

Anton Kaisti (born 17 May 1992) is a Finnish badminton player. He joined Finnish national badminton team since 2007, then in 2014 he won a bronze medal at the European Men's Team Championships in Basel.

In 2013, he won mixed doubles event in Estonian International, Bulgaria Eurasia Open, Irish International, and Turkey International. He became the runner-up at the Irish International in men's singles event. In 2014, he won Norwegian International in men's doubles and mixed doubles. In 2015, for the first time of him won the men's singles event through Estonian International tournament. In 2016, he won Iceland International in mixed doubles with his partner from the Netherlands Cheryl Seinen.

== Achievements ==
=== BWF International Challenge/Series (14 titles, 5 runners-up) ===
Men's singles
Year	Tournament	Opponent	Score	Result
2013	Irish International	(Denmark) Kian Andersen	17–21, 17–21	(silver) Runner-up
2015	Estonian International	(England) Toby Penty	21–16, 21–16	(gold) Winner

Men's doubles
Year	Tournament	Partner	Opponent	Score	Result
2014	Norwegian International	(Netherlands) Koen Ridder	(Poland) Miłosz Bochat (Poland) Maciej Dąbrowski	21–13, 21–14	(gold) Winner

Mixed doubles
Year	Tournament	Partner	Opponent	Score	Result
2013	Estonian International	(Finland) Jenny Nyström	(France) Bastian Kersaudy (France) Anne Tran	21–18, 21–10	(gold) Winner
2013	Bulgarian Eurasia Open	(Bulgaria) Gabriela Stoeva	(Germany) Marvin Seidel (Germany) Yvonne Li	19–21, 21–9, 21–18	(gold) Winner
2013	Irish International	(Finland) Jenny Nyström	(France) Jordan Corvée (France) Marie Batomene	20–22, 21–17, 21–13	(gold) Winner
2013	Turkey International	(Bulgaria) Gabriela Stoeva	(Russia) Vasily Kuznetsov (Russia) Viktoriia Vorobeva	21–9, 21–15	(gold) Winner
2014	Norwegian International	(Netherlands) Cheryl Seinen	(Sweden) Filip Michael Duwall Myhren (Sweden) Emma Wengberg	21–15, 17–21, 21–14	(gold) Winner
2016	Iceland International	(Netherlands) Cheryl Seinen	(Poland) Paweł Pietryja (Poland) Aneta Wojtkowska	22–20, 21–18	(gold) Winner
2016	Norwegian International	(Finland) Jenny Nyström	(Denmark) Mathias Bay-Smidt (Denmark) Alexandra Bøje	21–12, 21–12	(gold) Winner
2016	Finnish International	(Finland) Jenny Nyström	(Denmark) Philip Seerup (Denmark) Irina Amalie Andersen	11–6, 12–14, 11–7, 15–13	(gold) Winner
2017	Portugal International	(Finland) Jenny Nyström	(France) Thom Gicquel (France) Delphine Delrue	19–21, 21–19, 21–12	(gold) Winner
2017	Dutch International	(Finland) Jenny Nyström	(Netherlands) Jim Middelburg (Netherlands) Myke Halkema	21–18, 21–18	(gold) Winner
2018	Bulgarian Open	(Finland) Inalotta Suutarinen	(Bulgaria) Alex Vlaar (Bulgaria) Mariya Mitsova	17–21, 21–17, 16–21	(silver) Runner-up
2019	Slovenian International	(Finland) Inalotta Suutarinen	(England) Gregory Mairs (England) Victoria Williams	16–21, 17–21	(silver) Runner-up
2020	Austrian Open	(Czech Republic) Alžběta Bášová	(Denmark) Jeppe Bay (Denmark) Sara Lundgaard	16–21, 13–21	(silver) Runner-up
2022	Swedish Open	(Czech Republic) Alžběta Bášová	(Denmark) Kristian Kræmer (Denmark) Amalie Cecilie Kudsk	21–19, 21–16	(gold) Winner
2024	Finnish International	(Finland) Oona Tapola	(Malaysia) Tan Wei Liang (Malaysia) Wong Kha Yan	19–21, 16–21	(silver) Runner-up
2026	Finnish International	(Finland) Iina Suutarinen	(Sweden) Johan Azelius (Sweden) Romina Olyaee	21–18, 22–20	(gold) Winner

BWF International Challenge tournament
BWF International Series tournament
BWF Future Series tournament
