= Frederik Colberg =

Danish badminton player (born 1993)

Personal information
- Born: 31 March 1993 (age 33) Holbæk, Denmark

Sport
- Country: Denmark
- Sport: Badminton

Men's & mixed doubles
- Highest ranking: 38 (MD with Rasmus Fladberg 30 November 2017); 90 (XD with Sara Thygesen 5 September 2013)
- BWF profile
Medal record
Men's badminton
Representing Denmark
European Junior Championships
Bronze medal – third place	2011 Vantaa	Mixed team

Frederik Colberg (born 31 March 1993) is a Danish badminton player from Holbæk. He won his first international title at the 2010 Iceland International tournament in the mixed doubles event partnered with Mette Poulsen. Colberg was part of the Danish junior team that won a bronze medal at the 2011 European Junior Championships. Teamed-up with Rasmus Fladberg, they managed to claim the men's doubles title at the 2017 National Championships, and some international titles in the 2016 Yonex / K&D Graphics, 2017 Belgian, and Hungarian International tournaments; and also won the 2018 Spanish International partnered with Joachim Fischer Nielsen.

== Achievements ==
=== BWF International Challenge/Series ===
Men's doubles
Year	Tournament	Partner	Opponent	Score	Result
2010	Iceland International	(Denmark) Kasper Paulsen	(Denmark) Emil Holst (Denmark) Mikkel Mikkelsen	15–21, 17–21	(silver) Runner-up
2013	Hungarian International	(Denmark) Mikkel Mikkelsen	(Indonesia) Indra Viki Okvana (Indonesia) Albert Saputra	16–21, 21–23	(silver) Runner-up
2014	Hellas International	(Denmark) Mikkel Mikkelsen	(Denmark) Mathias Christiansen (Denmark) David Daugaard	0–0 retired	(silver) Runner-up
2016	Belgian International	(Denmark) Rasmus Fladberg	(Chinese Taipei) Lu Ching-yao (Chinese Taipei) Yang Po-han	13–21, 13–21	(silver) Runner-up
2016	Hungarian International	(Denmark) Rasmus Fladberg	(Singapore) Danny Bawa Chrisnanta (Singapore) Hendra Wijaya	7–11, 15–14, 11–7, 9–11, 8–11	(silver) Runner-up
2016	Yonex / K&D Graphics International	(Denmark) Rasmus Fladberg	(Canada) B. R. Sankeerth (Canada) Nyl Yakura	21–8, 18–21, 21–6	(gold) Winner
2017	Austrian Open	(Denmark) Rasmus Fladberg	(Japan) Takuto Inoue (Japan) Yuki Kaneko	19–21, 17–21	(silver) Runner-up
2017	Belgian International	(Denmark) Rasmus Fladberg	(England) Peter Briggs (England) Tom Wolfenden	16–21, 21–13, 21–6	(gold) Winner
2017	Hungarian International	(Denmark) Rasmus Fladberg	(Denmark) Joel Eipe (Denmark) Philip Seerup	21–18, 21–14	(gold) Winner
2018	Spanish International	(Denmark) Joachim Fischer Nielsen	(Thailand) Bodin Isara (Thailand) Maneepong Jongjit	21–23, 21–19, 21–15	(gold) Winner

Mixed doubles
Year	Tournament	Partner	Opponent	Score	Result
2010	Iceland International	(Denmark) Mette Poulsen	(Denmark) Kasper Paulsen (Denmark) Josephine van Zaane	21–17, 8–21, 21–16	(gold) Winner
2013	Croatian International	(Denmark) Sara Thygesen	(Denmark) Niclas Nøhr (Denmark) Rikke Søby Hansen	21–12, 12–21, 9–21	(silver) Runner-up

BWF International Challenge tournament
BWF International Series tournament
BWF Future Series tournament
