= Clara Nistad =

Swedish badminton player (born 1996)

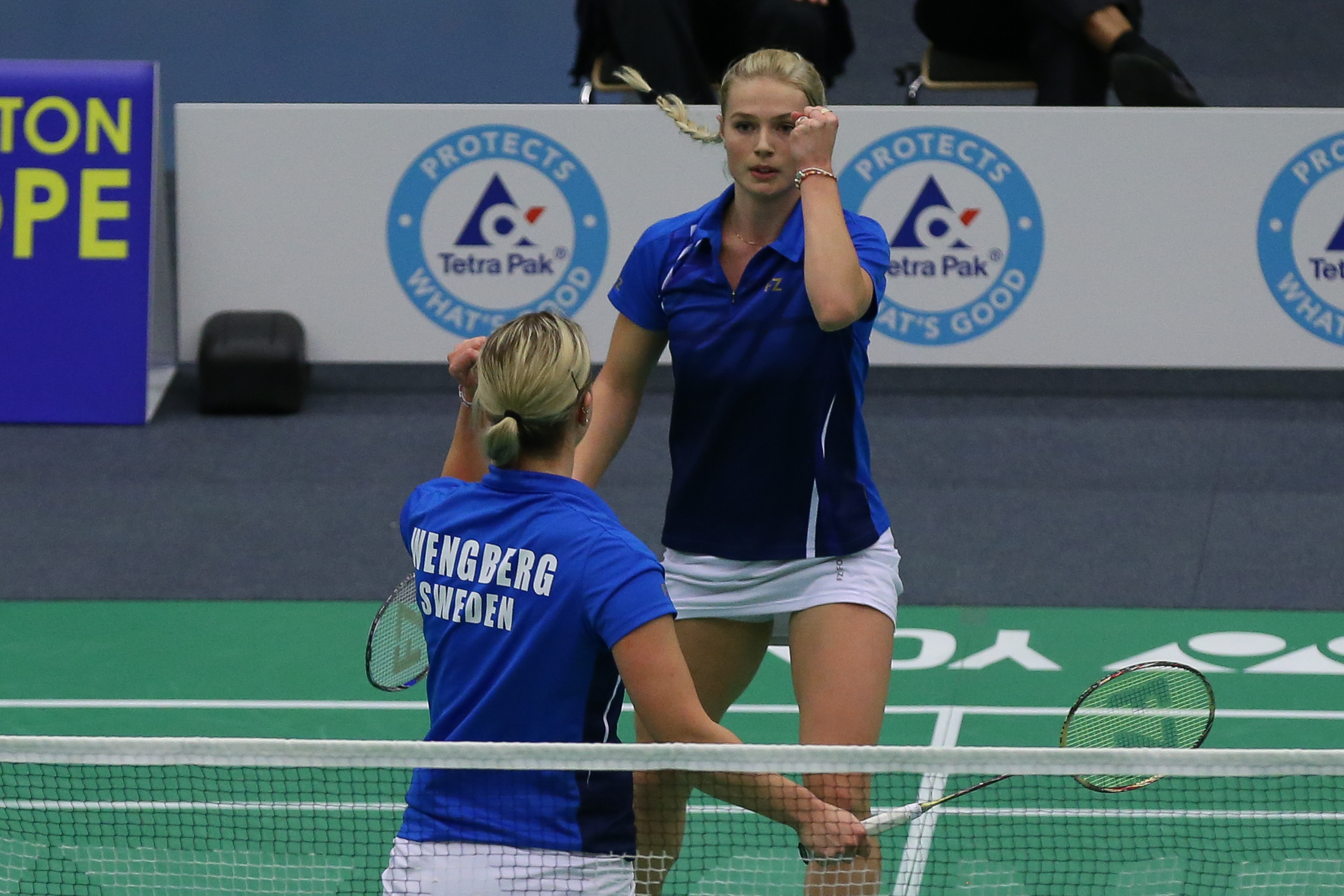
- Nistad with Emma Wengberg in 2017

Personal information
- Born: 8 February 1996 (age 30) Stockholm, Sweden
- Years active: 2013–present
- Height: 1.70 m (5 ft 7 in)

Sport
- Country: Sweden
- Sport: Badminton
- Handedness: Right

Women's singles & doubles
- Highest ranking: 399 (WS, 22 September 2016); 29 (WD with Emma Wengberg, 16 March 2017); 69 (XD with Richard Eidestedt, 28 June 2018)
- BWF profile

Clara Nistad (born 8 February 1996) is a Swedish badminton player. In 2015, she won the Polish and Finnish International tournaments in the women's doubles event partnered with Emma Wengberg. In 2017, she and Wengberg won the women's doubles title at the Swedish International Series tournament.

== Achievements ==
=== BWF International Challenge/Series (6 titles, 2 runners-up) ===
Women's doubles
Year	Tournament	Partner	Opponent	Score	Result
2015	Polish International	(Sweden) Emma Wengberg	(England) Chloe Birch (England) Jessica Pugh	21–16, 6–21, 21–15	(gold) Winner
2015	Finnish International	(Sweden) Emma Wengberg	(Netherlands) Alida Chen (Netherlands) Cheryl Seinen	21–16, 22–20	(gold) Winner
2017	Swedish International	(Sweden) Emma Wengberg	(Denmark) Alexandra Bøje (Denmark) Lena Grebak	21–17, 24–22	(gold) Winner
2018	Kharkiv International	(Sweden) Amanda Högström	(Estonia) Kristin Kuuba (Estonia) Kati-Kreet Marran	21–8, 21–11	(gold) Winner
2019	Portugal International	(Denmark) Julie Finne-Ipsen	(Chinese Taipei) Chang Ching-hui (Chinese Taipei) Yang Ching-tun	21–11, 21–15	(gold) Winner
2021	Dutch Open	(Sweden) Johanna Magnusson	(Netherlands) Debora Jille (Netherlands) Cheryl Seinen	17–21, 21–14, 21–12	(gold) Winner
2022	Swedish Open	(Sweden) Johanna Magnusson	(Thailand) Chasinee Korepap (Thailand) Jhenicha Sudjaipraparat	16–21, 21–23	(silver) Runner-up
2022	Norwegian International	(Sweden) Jessica Silvennoinen	(Chinese Taipei) Chang Ching-hui (Chinese Taipei) Yang Ching-tun	21–14, 12–21, 15–21	(silver) Runner-up

BWF International Challenge tournament
BWF International Series tournament
BWF Future Series tournament
