= Finnish International (badminton) =

International open badminton tournament

The Finnish International is an international open badminton tournament held in Finland since 2014. Up to 2013, the Finnish Open has been named Finnish International. In 2014, the second international tournament in Finland launched as Finnish International, then the original tournament changed its title to Finnish Open.

== Previous winners ==
Year	Men's singles	Women's singles	Men's doubles	Women's doubles	Mixed doubles	Ref
2014	(Finland) Eetu Heino	(Russia) Olga Golovanova	(Denmark) Mathias Bay-Smidt (Denmark) Frederik Søgaard	(Russia) Victoria Dergunova (Russia) Olga Morozova	(Germany) Jones Ralfy Jansen (Germany) Cisita Joity Jansen	
2015	(Denmark) Steffen Rasmussen	(Indonesia) Febby Angguni	(Russia) Nikita Khakimov (Russia) Vasily Kuznetsov	(Sweden) Clara Nistad (Sweden) Emma Wengberg	(Sweden) Filip Michael Duwall Myhren (Sweden) Emma Wengberg	
2016	(Denmark) Victor Svendsen	(Denmark) Irina Amalie Andersen	(Denmark) Jeppe Bay (Denmark) Rasmus Kjær	(Denmark) Irina Amalie Andersen (Denmark) Julie Dawall Jakobsen	(Finland) Anton Kaisti (Finland) Jenny Nyström	
2017– 2023	No competition					
2024	(Japan) Yudai Okimoto	(France) Anna Tatranova	(Estonia) Karl Kert (Estonia) Tauri Kilk	(Australia) Priska Kustiadi (Australia) Nozomi Shimizu	(Malaysia) Tan Wei Liang (Malaysia) Wong Kha Yan	
2025	No competition					
2026	(Japan) Hyuga Takano	(Japan) Yuzuno Watanabe	(Sweden) Jakob Ekman (Sweden) Oscar Reuterhäll	(Estonia) Catlyn Kruus (Estonia) Ramona Üprus	(Finland) Anton Kaisti (Finland) Iina Suutarinen	

== Performances by nation ==
As of 2026 edition

Pos	Nation	MS	WS	MD	WD	XD	Total
1	Denmark	2	1	2	1	0	6
2	Finland*	1	0	0	0	2	3
2	Japan	2	1	0	0	0	3
2	Russia	0	1	1	1	0	3
2	Sweden	0	0	1	1	1	3
6	Estonia	0	0	1	1	0	2
7	Australia	0	0	0	1	0	1
7	France	0	1	0	0	0	1
7	Germany	0	0	0	0	1	1
7	Indonesia	0	1	0	0	0	1
7	Malaysia	0	0	0	0	1	1
Total		5	5	5	5	5	25

* Host nation

== See also ==
- Arctic Open
