= 2016 Uber Cup qualification =

Tournament details
- Dates: 15 – 20 February 2016
- Venue: BA: GMC Balayogi Indoor Stadium; BCA: National Badminton Centre; BE: Kazan Gymnastics Center; BO: X-TRM North Harbour Centre; BPA: CODE II Jalisco
- Location: BA: Hyderabad, India; BCA: Rose Hill, Mauritius; BE: Kazan, Russia; BO: Auckland, New Zealand; BPA: Guadalajara, Mexico

The 2016 Uber Cup qualification process is a series of tournaments organised by the five BWF confederations to decide 15 of the 16 teams which will play in the 2016 Uber Cup, with China qualifying automatically both as hosts, and trophy holder.

== Qualified teams ==
Country	Confederation	Qualified as	Qualified on	World Team Rankings	Final appearance
China	Badminton Asia	Host country & 2014 Uber Cup winner	May 2014	1st	17th
Mauritius	Badminton Africa	2016 Africa Team Championships winner	19 February 2016	38th	Debut
Japan	Badminton Asia	2016 Asia Team Championships semifinalists	19 February 2016	2nd	23rd
South Korea	Badminton Asia	2016 Asia Team Championships semifinalists	19 February 2016	3rd	17th
Thailand	Badminton Asia	2016 Asia Team Championships semifinalists	19 February 2016	4th	5th
Bulgaria	Badminton Europe	2016 European Team Championships semifinalists	19 February 2016	16th	Debut
Denmark	Badminton Europe	2016 European Team Championships semifinalists	19 February 2016	8th	19th
Germany	Badminton Europe	2016 European Team Championships semifinalists	19 February 2016	9th	8th
Spain	Badminton Europe	2016 European Team Championships semifinalists	19 February 2016	11th	Debut
Australia	Badminton Oceania	2016 Oceania Team Championships winner	20 February 2016	22nd	7th
United States	Badminton Pan Am	2016 Pan Am Team Championships winner	20 February 2016	13th	11th
India	Badminton Asia	Best ranking (Asia)	3 March 2016	15th	5th
Indonesia	Badminton Asia	Best ranking (overall)	3 March 2016	6th	23rd
Chinese Taipei	Badminton Asia	Best ranking (overall)	3 March 2016	7th	5th
Malaysia	Badminton Asia	Best ranking (overall)	3 March 2016	10th	11th
Hong Kong	Badminton Asia	Best ranking (overall)	3 March 2016	12th	7th

== Qualification process ==
The number of teams participating in the final tournament is 16. The allocation of slots for each confederation is 4 from each Asia and Europe, and 1 from each Africa, Oceania and Pan Am. Two automatic qualifiers are the host and defending champion. The remaining quota will be filled by World Team Ranking.

== Confederation qualification ==
=== Badminton Confederation of Africa ===
The qualification for the African teams was held from 16 to 19 February 2016, at the National Badminton Centre in Rose Hill, Mauritius. The winners of the African qualification will qualified for the Uber Cup.

==== Teams in contention ====
Teams qualified for the Group stage

- Egypt
- Ghana
- Mauritius
- Réunion
- Uganda
- Zimbabwe

==== First round (group stage) ====
Advance to Knockout stage

Group A

Pos	Team	Pld	Pts
1	Egypt	2	2
2	Uganda	2	1
3	Réunion	2	0

Source: TS
Group B

Pos	Team	Pld	Pts
1	Mauritius	2	2
2	Ghana	2	1
3	Zimbabwe	2	0

Source: TS

==== Second round (knockout stage) ====
Semi-finals
18 February
Egypt	3
Ghana	0
18 February
Uganda	0
Mauritius	3

Final
19 February
Egypt	0
Mauritius	3

=== Badminton Asia ===
The qualification for the Asian teams was held from 15 to 21 February 2016, at the GMC Balayogi Indoor Stadium in Hyderabad, India. The semi-finalist of the Asian qualification will qualified for the Uber Cup. China qualifying automatically as hosts and trophy holder.

==== Teams in contention ====
Teams qualified for the Group stage

- China (qualified)
- Hong Kong
- Indonesia
- India
- Japan
- Malaysia
- Maldives
- Singapore
- Sri Lanka
- South Korea
- Chinese Taipei
- Thailand

==== First round (group stage) ====
Advance to Knockout stage

Group A
Group B

Pos	Team	Pld	Pts
1	China	2	2
2	Malaysia	2	1
3	Hong Kong	2	0

Source: TS

Pos	Team	Pld	Pts
1	Thailand	2	2
2	Chinese Taipei	2	1
3	Sri Lanka	2	0

Source: TS
Group C
Group D

Pos	Team	Pld	Pts
1	South Korea	2	2
2	Indonesia	2	1
3	Maldives	2	0

Source: TS

Pos	Team	Pld	Pts
1	Japan	2	2
2	India	2	1
3	Singapore	2	0

Source: TS

==== Second round (knockout stage) ====
Quarter-finals
19 February
China (1)	3
Indonesia	0
19 February
South Korea (3)	3
India	0
19 February
Malaysia	0
Thailand (4)	3
19 February
Chinese Taipei	1
Japan (2)	3

Semi-finals
20 February
China (1)	3
South Korea (3)	0
20 February
Thailand (4)	0
Japan (2)	3

Final
21 February
China (1)	3
Japan (2)	2

=== Badminton Europe ===
The qualification for the European teams was held from 15 to 21 February 2016, at the Kazan Gymnastics Center in Kazan, Russia. The semi-finalist of the European qualification will qualified for the Uber Cup.

==== Teams in contention ====
Teams qualified for the Group stage

- Belarus
- Belgium
- Bulgaria
- Czech Republic
- Denmark
- England
- Estonia
- Finland
- France
- Germany
- Hungary
- Ireland
- Italy
- Lithuania
- Russia
- Slovakia
- Spain
- Turkey
- Ukraine

==== First round (group stage) ====
Advance to Knockout stage

Group 1
Group 2
Group 3

Pos	Team	Pld	Pts
1	Denmark	3	3
2	Finland	3	2
3	Lithuania	3	1
4	Belarus	3	0

Source: TS

Pos	Team	Pld	Pts
1	Bulgaria	3	3
2	Spain	3	2
3	Estonia	3	1
4	Belgium	3	0

Source: TS

Pos	Team	Pld	Pts
1	Germany	2	2
2	England	2	1
3	France	2	0
4	Wales	0	0

Source: TS
Group 4
Group 5

Pos	Team	Pld	Pts
1	Ukraine	3	3
2	Turkey	3	2
3	Czech Republic	3	1
4	Italy	3	0

Source: TS

Pos	Team	Pld	Pts
1	Russia	3	3
2	Hungary	3	2
3	Ireland	3	1
4	Slovakia	3	0

Source: TS

Ranking of runners-up

Pos	Grp	Team	Pld	W	L	MF	MA	MD	GF	GA	GD	PF	PA	PD	Pts	Qualification
1	4	Turkey	3	2	1	10	5	+5	22	14	+8	698	571	+127	2	Knockout stage
2	2	Spain	3	2	1	10	5	+5	21	14	+7	673	591	+82	2	Knockout stage
3	1	Finland	3	2	1	9	6	+3	19	15	+4	596	590	+6	2	Knockout stage
4	5	Hungary	3	2	1	7	8	−1	16	19	−3	564	654	−90	2	
5	3	England	3	2	1	4	6	−2	11	13	−2	430	456	−26	2	

Source: BWF

==== Second round (knockout stage) ====
Quarter-finals
19 February 2016
Denmark	3
Finland	0
Germany	3
Russia	0
Spain	3
Ukraine	0
Turkey	1
Bulgaria	3

Semi-finals
20 February 2016
Denmark	3
Germany	1
Spain	2
Bulgaria	3

Final
21 February 2016
Denmark	3
Bulgaria	1

=== Badminton Oceania ===
The qualification for the Pan Am teams was held from 19 to 20 February 2016, at the X-TRM North Harbour Centre in Auckland, New Zealand. The winner of the Oceania qualification will qualified for the Uber Cup.

==== Teams in contention ====
Teams qualified for the Group stage

- Australia
- Guam
- New Caledonia
- New Zealand
- Tahiti

==== Round-robin ====
Pos	Team	Pld	W	L	MF	MA	MD	GF	GA	GD	PF	PA	PD	Pts	Qualification
1	Australia	4	4	0	19	1	+18	38	2	+36	830	288	+542	4	Thomas Cup
2	New Zealand	4	3	1	16	4	+12	32	8	+24	758	410	+348	3	
3	New Caledonia	4	2	2	9	11	−2	19	24	−5	613	771	−158	2	
4	Tahiti	4	1	3	6	14	−8	14	29	−15	549	790	−241	1	
5	Guam	4	0	4	0	20	−20	0	40	−40	349	840	−491	0	

Source: TS

=== Badminton Pan Am ===
The qualification for the Pan Am teams was held from 17 to 20 February 2016, at the CODE II Jalisco in Guadalajara, Mexico. The winner of the Pan Am qualification will qualified for the Uber Cup.

==== Teams in contention ====
Teams qualified for the Group stage

- Canada
- Guatemala
- Mexico
- United States

==== First round (group stage) ====
Pos	Team	Pld	W	L	MF	MA	MD	GF	GA	GD	PF	PA	PD	Pts	Qualification
1	United States	3	3	0	12	3	+9	26	7	+19	662	449	+213	3	Final
2	Canada	3	2	1	11	4	+7	23	10	+13	645	520	+125	2	Final
3	Mexico	3	1	2	7	8	−1	14	18	−4	549	573	−24	1	
4	Guatemala	3	0	3	0	15	−15	2	30	−28	359	673	−314	0	

Source: TS

==== Second round (final) ====
Team 1	Score	Team 2
United States	3–2	Canada

== World team rankings ==
Below is the chart of the BWF World Team Ranking calculated by adding World Ranking of top three Women's Singles players and top two Women's Doubles pairs on 3 March 2016.

Rank	Conf.	Nation	Points	Continental results	Qualification status
1	BA	China	361,084	Winner	Qualified as host & trophy holder
2	BA	Japan	301,384	Runner-up	Qualified as BA semifinalists
3	BA	South Korea	280,810	Semifinals	Qualified as BA semifinalists
4	BA	Thailand	245,973	Semifinals	Qualified as BA semifinalists
5	BA	India	224,313	Quarterfinals	Qualified by ranking (Asia)
6	BA	Indonesia	218,837	Quarterfinals	Qualified by ranking (overall)
7	BA	Chinese Taipei	199,685	Quarterfinals	Qualified by ranking (overall)
8	BE	Denmark	187,848	Winner	Qualified as BE semifinalists
9	BE	Germany	161,880	Semifinals	Qualified as BE semifinalists
10	BA	Malaysia	154,821	Quarterfinals	Qualified by ranking (overall)
11	BE	Spain	149,377	Semifinals	Qualified as BE semifinalists
12	BA	Hong Kong	137,241	Group stage	Qualified by ranking (overall)
13	BPA	United States	131,849	Winner	Qualified as the winner of BPA
14	BE	Netherlands	125,701		
15	BE	Turkey	118,033	Quarterfinals	
16	BE	Bulgaria	109,565	Runner-up	Qualified as BE semifinalists
17	BPA	Canada	109,214	Runner-up	
18	BE	England	105,431	Group stage	
19	BE	Russia	103,520	Quarterfinals	
20	BPA	Brazil	98,557		
21	BA	Singapore	95,039	Group stage	
22	BO	Australia	94,606	Winner	Qualified as the winner of BO
23	BE	France	85,778	Group stage	
24	BCA	Egypt	78,776	Runner-up	
25	BPA	Mexico	78,317	3rd place	
26	BE	Finland	72,775	Quarterfinals	
27	BE	Czech Republic	66,518	Group stage	
28	BE	Ukraine	62,456	Quarterfinals	
29	BE	Switzerland	60,772		
30	BA	Vietnam	59,674		
31	BE	Estonia	57,541	Group stage	
32	BE	Scotland	57,430		
33	BPA	Peru	57,320		
34	BE	Belgium	52,075	Group stage	
35	BA	Iran	45,730		
36	BE	Hungary	44,953	Group stage	
37	BE	Ireland	44,743	Group stage	
38	BCA	Mauritius	42,766	Winner	Qualified as the winner of BCA
39	BCA	Nigeria	39,632		
40	BE	Austria	33,818		
41	BE	Sweden	33,500		
42	BO	New Zealand	32,413	Runner-up	
43	BE	Italy	31,688	Group stage	
44	BE	Portugal	29,930		
45	BE	Latvia	29,100		
46	BPA	Guatemala	28,110	4th place	
47	BE	Israel	27,547		
48	BE	Slovakia	27,127	Group stage	
49	BE	Wales	26,390		
50	BE	Lithuania	24,632	Group stage	
50+ participants
51	BE	Belarus	24,054	Group stage	
53	BA	Sri Lanka	21,465	Group stage	
62	BCA	Uganda	15,335	Semifinals	
77	BCA	Ghana	8,033	Semifinals	
86	BO	New Caledonia	5,549	3rd place	
92	BA	Maldives	3,540	Group stage	
101	BO	Tahiti	1,106	4th place	
107	BCA	Réunion	108	Group stage	
108	BO	Guam	7	5th place	
–	BCA	Zimbabwe	–	Group stage	
