= 2016 European Women's Team Badminton Championships group stage =

This article lists the full results for group stage of 2016 European Women's Team Badminton Championships. The group stage was held from 16 to 18 February 2016.

== Group 1 ==
| Pos | Team | Pld | W | L | MF | MA | MD | GF | GA | GD | PF | PA | PD | Pts | Qualification | Denmark | Finland | Lithuania | Belarus |
|---|---|---|---|---|---|---|---|---|---|---|---|---|---|---|---|---|---|---|---|
| 1 | Denmark | 3 | 3 | 0 | 14 | 1 | +13 | 29 | 2 | +27 | 645 | 308 | +337 | 3 | Knockout stage | — | 4–1 | 5–0 | 5–0 |
| 2 | Finland | 3 | 2 | 1 | 9 | 6 | +3 | 19 | 15 | +4 | 596 | 590 | +6 | 2 | Knockout stage | | — | 4–1 | 4–1 |
| 3 | Lithuania | 3 | 1 | 2 | 5 | 10 | −5 | 11 | 22 | −11 | 477 | 615 | −138 | 1 | | | | — | 4–1 |
| 4 | Belarus | 3 | 0 | 3 | 2 | 13 | −11 | 7 | 27 | −20 | 466 | 671 | −205 | 0 | | | | | — |

Source: TS

=== Denmark vs. Finland ===
Denmark
4
Kazan Gymnastics Center, Court 2
16 February 2016, 18:00 UTC+3

Finland
1

| | | | 1 | 2 | 3 |
|---|---|---|---|---|---|
| 1 | (Denmark) (Finland) | Line Kjærsfeldt; Nanna Vainio | 16; 21 | 21; 9 | 20; 22 |
| 2 | (Denmark) (Finland) | Mette Poulsen; Airi Mikkelä | 21; 13 | 21; 14 |
| 3 | (Denmark) (Finland) | Julie Dawall Jakobsen; Sonja Pekkola | 21; 16 | 21; 10 |
| 4 | (Denmark) (Finland) | Kamilla Rytter Juhl / Christinna Pedersen; Mathilda Lindholm / Jenny Nyström | 21; 9 | 21; 11 |
| 5 | (Denmark) (Finland) | Maiken Fruergaard / Sara Thygesen; Airi Mikkelä / Sonja Pekkola | 21; 11 | 21; 9 |

=== Belarus vs. Lithuania ===
Belarus
1
Kazan Gymnastics Center, Court 8
16 February 2016, 18:00 UTC+3

Lithuania
4

| | | | 1 | 2 | 3 |
|---|---|---|---|---|---|
| 1 | (Belarus) (Lithuania) | Alesia Zaitsava; Akvilė Stapušaitytė | 19; 21 | 12; 21 |
| 2 | (Belarus) (Lithuania) | Anastasiya Cherniavskaya; Gerda Voitechovskaja | 17; 21 | 5; 21 |
| 3 | (Belarus) (Lithuania) | Kristina Silich; Vytautė Fomkinaitė | 9; 21 | 21; 14 | 14; 21 |
| 4 | (Belarus) (Lithuania) | Julia Bitsoukova / Alesia Zaitsava; Rebeka Aleksevičiūtė / Gerda Voitechovskaja | 21; 17 | 21; 9 |
| 5 | (Belarus) (Lithuania) | Anastasiya Cherniavskaya / Kristina Silich; Vytautė Fomkinaitė / Akvilė Stapušaitytė | 21; 16 | 17; 21 | 14; 21 |

=== Denmark vs. Belarus ===
Denmark
5
Kazan Gymnastics Center, Court 4
17 February 2016, 18:00 UTC+3

Belarus
0

| | | | 1 | 2 | 3 |
|---|---|---|---|---|---|
| 1 | (Denmark) (Belarus) | Line Kjærsfeldt; Alesia Zaitsava | 21; 16 | 21; 9 |
| 2 | (Denmark) (Belarus) | Anna-Thea Madsen; Julia Bitsoukova | 21; 7 | 21; 7 |
| 3 | (Denmark) (Belarus) | Mette Poulsen; Maryana Viarbitskaya | 21; 3 | 21; 16 |
| 4 | (Denmark) (Belarus) | Kamilla Rytter Juhl / Christinna Pedersen; Anastasiya Cherniavskaya / Kristina Silich | 21; 5 | 21; 2 |
| 5 | (Denmark) (Belarus) | Maiken Fruergaard / Lena Grebak; Julia Bitsoukova / Maryana Viarbitskaya | 21; 7 | 21; 6 |

=== Finland vs. Lithuania ===
Finland
4
Kazan Gymnastics Center, Court 5
17 February 2016, 18:00 UTC+3

Lithuania
1

| | | | 1 | 2 | 3 |
|---|---|---|---|---|---|
| 1 | (Finland) (Lithuania) | Airi Mikkelä; Akvilė Stapušaitytė | 16; 21 | 15; 21 |
| 2 | (Finland) (Lithuania) | Sonja Pekkola; Gerda Voitechovskaja | 21; 16 | 21; 8 |
| 3 | (Finland) (Lithuania) | Jenny Nyström; Vytautė Fomkinaitė | 21; 15 | 21; 15 |
| 4 | (Finland) (Lithuania) | Jenny Nyström / Sonja Pekkola; Rebeka Aleksevičiūtė / Gerda Voitechovskaja | 15; 21 | 21; 15 | 21; 11 |
| 5 | (Finland) (Lithuania) | Mathilda Lindholm / Airi Mikkelä; Vytautė Fomkinaitė / Indrė Starevičiutė | 21; 9 | 21; 16 |

=== Denmark vs. Lithuania ===
Denmark
5
Kazan Gymnastics Center, Court 2
18 February 2016, 10:00 UTC+3

Lithuania
0

| | | | 1 | 2 | 3 |
|---|---|---|---|---|---|
| 1 | (Denmark) (Lithuania) | Line Kjærsfeldt; Akvilė Stapušaitytė | 21; 13 | 21; 12 |
| 2 | (Denmark) (Lithuania) | Anna-Thea Madsen; Vytautė Fomkinaitė | 21; 9 | 21; 5 |
| 3 | (Denmark) (Lithuania) | Julie Dawall Jakobsen; Rebeka Aleksevičiūtė | 21; 10 | 21; 5 |
| 4 | (Denmark) (Lithuania) | Lena Grebak / Mette Poulsen; Vytautė Fomkinaitė / Indrė Starevičiutė | 21; 7 | 21; 7 |
| 5 | (Denmark) (Lithuania) | Maiken Fruergaard / Sara Thygesen; Rebeka Aleksevičiūtė / Gerda Voitechovskaja | 21; 5 | 21; 12 |

=== Finland vs. Belarus ===
Finland
4
Kazan Gymnastics Center, Court 8
18 February 2016, 10:00 UTC+3

Belarus
1

| | | | 1 | 2 | 3 |
|---|---|---|---|---|---|
| 1 | (Finland) (Belarus) | Airi Mikkelä; Alesia Zaitsava | 21; 17 | 14; 21 | 19; 21 |
| 2 | (Finland) (Belarus) | Sonja Pekkola; Anastasiya Cherniavskaya | 21; 7 | 21; 14 |
| 3 | (Finland) (Belarus) | Jenny Nyström; Kristina Silich | 21; 18 | 14; 21 | 21; 13 |
| 4 | (Finland) (Belarus) | Jenny Nyström / Sonja Pekkola; Anastasiya Cherniavskaya / Alesia Zaitsava | 21; 14 | 21; 15 |
| 5 | (Finland) (Belarus) | Mathilda Lindholm / Airi Mikkelä; Julia Bitsoukova / Kristina Silich | 21; 16 | 22; 20 |

== Group 2 ==
| Pos | Team | Pld | W | L | MF | MA | MD | GF | GA | GD | PF | PA | PD | Pts | Qualification | Bulgaria | Spain | Estonia | Belgium |
|---|---|---|---|---|---|---|---|---|---|---|---|---|---|---|---|---|---|---|---|
| 1 | Bulgaria | 3 | 3 | 0 | 13 | 2 | +11 | 27 | 9 | +18 | 712 | 523 | +189 | 3 | Knockout stage | — | 3–2 | 5–0 | 5–0 |
| 2 | Spain | 3 | 2 | 1 | 10 | 5 | +5 | 21 | 14 | +7 | 673 | 591 | +82 | 2 | Knockout stage | | — | 3–2 | 5–0 |
| 3 | Estonia | 3 | 1 | 2 | 7 | 8 | −1 | 18 | 16 | +2 | 620 | 636 | −16 | 1 | | | | — | 5–0 |
| 4 | Belgium | 3 | 0 | 3 | 0 | 15 | −15 | 3 | 30 | −27 | 420 | 675 | −255 | 0 | | | | | — |

Source: TS

=== Spain vs. Bulgaria ===
Spain
2
Kazan Gymnastics Center, Court 1
16 February 2016, 13:00 UTC+3

Bulgaria
3

| | | | 1 | 2 | 3 |
|---|---|---|---|---|---|
| 1 | (Spain) (Bulgaria) | Carolina Marín; Linda Zetchiri | 21; 15 | 21; 14 |
| 2 | (Spain) (Bulgaria) | Beatriz Corrales; Petya Nedelcheva | 19; 21 | 12; 21 |
| 3 | (Spain) (Bulgaria) | Clara Azurmendi; Stefani Stoeva | 21; 17 | 17; 21 | 13; 21 |
| 4 | (Spain) (Bulgaria) | Haideé Ojeda / Sara Peñalver; Petya Nedelcheva / Gabriela Stoeva | 14; 21 | 6; 21 |
| 5 | (Spain) (Bulgaria) | Beatriz Corrales / Carolina Marín; Stefani Stoeva / Linda Zetchiri | 21; 17 | 18; 21 | 21; 13 |

=== Belgium vs. Estonia ===
Belgium
0
Kazan Gymnastics Center, Court 5
16 February 2016, 13:00 UTC+3

Estonia
5

| | | | 1 | 2 | 3 |
|---|---|---|---|---|---|
| 1 | (Belgium) (Estonia) | Lianne Tan; Kati Tolmoff | 11; 21 | 13; 21 |
| 2 | (Belgium) (Estonia) | Flore Vandenhoucke; Getter Saar | 19; 21 | 16; 21 |
| 3 | (Belgium) (Estonia) | Marie Demeyere; Karoliine Hõim | 11; 21 | 16; 21 |
| 4 | (Belgium) (Estonia) | Lianne Tan / Flore Vandenhoucke; Kristin Kuuba / Helina Rüütel | 19; 21 | 15; 21 |
| 5 | (Belgium) (Estonia) | Marie Demeyere / Lise Jaques; Karoliine Hõim / Laura Vana | 11; 21 | 12; 21 |

=== Spain vs. Belgium ===
Spain
5
Kazan Gymnastics Center, Court 5
17 February 2016, 10:00 UTC+3

Belgium
0

| | | | 1 | 2 | 3 |
|---|---|---|---|---|---|
| 1 | (Spain) (Belgium) | Carolina Marín; Lianne Tan | 18; 21 | 21; 11 | 21; 11 |
| 2 | (Spain) (Belgium) | Beatriz Corrales; Flore Vandenhoucke | 21; 15 | 21; 12 |
| 3 | (Spain) (Belgium) | Clara Azurmendi; Marie Demeyere | 21; 6 | 21; 13 |
| 4 | (Spain) (Belgium) | Beatriz Corrales / Haideé Ojeda; Lise Jaques / Flore Vandenhoucke | 13; 21 | 21; 11 | 22; 20 |
| 5 | (Spain) (Belgium) | Carolina Marín / Sara Peñalver; Marie Demeyere / Lianne Tan | 21; 12 | 21; 11 |

=== Bulgaria vs. Estonia ===
Bulgaria
5
Kazan Gymnastics Center, Court 6
17 February 2016, 10:00 UTC+3

Estonia
0

| | | | 1 | 2 | 3 |
|---|---|---|---|---|---|
| 1 | (Bulgaria) (Estonia) | Linda Zetchiri; Kati Tolmoff | 22; 20 | 17; 21 | 21; 15 |
| 2 | (Bulgaria) (Estonia) | Petya Nedelcheva; Getter Saar | 21; 11 | 21; 11 |
| 3 | (Bulgaria) (Estonia) | Mariya Mitsova; Karoliine Hõim | 20; 22 | 21; 17 | 21; 7 |
| 4 | (Bulgaria) (Estonia) | Gabriela Stoeva / Stefani Stoeva; Kristin Kuuba / Helina Rüütel | 21; 11 | 21; 18 |
| 5 | (Bulgaria) (Estonia) | Mariya Mitsova / Petya Nedelcheva; Karoliine Hõim / Laura Vana | 16; 21 | 23; 21 | 21; 11 |

=== Spain vs. Estonia ===
Spain
3
Kazan Gymnastics Center, Court 6
18 February 2016, 14:00 UTC+3

Estonia
2

| | | | 1 | 2 | 3 |
|---|---|---|---|---|---|
| 1 | (Spain) (Estonia) | Carolina Marín; Kati Tolmoff | 17; 21 | 22; 20 | 21; 17 |
| 2 | (Spain) (Estonia) | Beatriz Corrales; Getter Saar | 21; 7 | 21; 11 |
| 3 | (Spain) (Estonia) | Clara Azurmendi; Laura Vana | 22; 24 | 21; 23 |
| 4 | (Spain) (Estonia) | Haideé Ojeda / Sara Peñalver; Kristin Kuuba / Helina Rüütel | 21; 23 | 18; 21 |
| 5 | (Spain) (Estonia) | Beatriz Corrales / Carolina Marín; Karoliine Hõim / Laura Vana | 22; 20 | 21; 17 |

=== Bulgaria vs. Belgium ===
Bulgaria
5
Kazan Gymnastics Center, Court 7
18 February 2016, 14:00 UTC+3

Belgium
0

| | | | 1 | 2 | 3 |
|---|---|---|---|---|---|
| 1 | (Bulgaria) (Belgium) | Linda Zetchiri; Lianne Tan | 21; 11 | 13; 21 | 21; 8 |
| 2 | (Bulgaria) (Belgium) | Petya Nedelcheva; Flore Vandenhoucke | 21; 11 | 21; 12 |
| 3 | (Bulgaria) (Belgium) | Mariya Mitsova; Marie Demeyere | 21; 12 | 21; 6 |
| 4 | (Bulgaria) (Belgium) | Gabriela Stoeva / Stefani Stoeva; Lise Jaques / Flore Vandenhoucke | 21; 8 | 21; 6 |
| 5 | (Bulgaria) (Belgium) | Mariya Mitsova / Petya Nedelcheva; Marie Demeyere / Lianne Tan | 21; 8 | 21; 10 |

== Group 3 ==
| Pos | Team | Pld | W | L | MF | MA | MD | GF | GA | GD | PF | PA | PD | Pts | Qualification | Germany | England | France | Wales |
|---|---|---|---|---|---|---|---|---|---|---|---|---|---|---|---|---|---|---|---|
| 1 | Germany | 2 | 2 | 0 | 8 | 2 | +6 | 17 | 7 | +10 | 472 | 388 | +84 | 2 | Knockout stage | — | 4–1 | 4–1 | — |
| 2 | England | 2 | 1 | 1 | 4 | 6 | −2 | 11 | 13 | −2 | 430 | 456 | −26 | 1 | | | — | 3–2 | — |
| 3 | France | 2 | 0 | 2 | 3 | 7 | −4 | 7 | 15 | −8 | 399 | 457 | −58 | 0 | | | | — | — |
| 4 | Wales | 0 | 0 | 0 | 0 | 0 | 0 | 0 | 0 | 0 | 0 | 0 | 0 | 0 | Withdrew | | | | — |

Source: TS

=== Germany vs. France ===
Germany
4
Kazan Gymnastics Center, Court 1
16 February 2016, 09:00 UTC+3

France
1

| | | | 1 | 2 | 3 |
|---|---|---|---|---|---|
| 1 | (Germany) (France) | Karin Schnaase; Delphine Lansac | 24; 22 | 22; 20 |
| 2 | (Germany) (France) | Johanna Goliszewski / Carla Nelte; Delphine Delrue / Léa Palermo | 21; 14 | 21; 12 |
| 3 | (Germany) (France) | Fabienne Deprez; Katia Normand | 21; 18 | 21; 15 |
| 4 | (Germany) (France) | Linda Efler / Isabel Herttrich; Émilie Lefel / Anne Tran | 21; 16 | 16; 21 | 20; 22 |
| 5 | (Germany) (France) | Luise Heim; Yaëlle Hoyaux | 21; 12 | 21; 14 |

=== England vs. Wales ===
England
-
Kazan Gymnastics Center
16 February 2016, 09:00 UTC+3

Wales
Withdrew

| | | 1 | 2 | 3 |
|---|---|---|---|---|
| 1 | (England) (Wales) |
| 2 | (England) (Wales) |
| 3 | (England) (Wales) |
| 4 | (England) (Wales) |
| 5 | (England) (Wales) |

=== Germany vs. England ===
Germany
4
Kazan Gymnastics Center, Court 1
17 February 2016, 18:00 UTC+3

England
1

| | | | 1 | 2 | 3 |
|---|---|---|---|---|---|---|
| 1 | (Germany) (England) | Karin Schnaase; Fontaine Chapman | 16; 21 | 21; 6 | 21; 10 |
| 2 | (Germany) (England) | Isabel Herttrich / Carla Nelte; Heather Olver / Lauren Smith | 22; 20 | 21; 11 |
| 3 | (Germany) (England) | Fabienne Deprez; Chloe Birch | 22; 20 | 15; 21 | 21; 13 |
| 4 | (Germany) (England) | Linda Efler / Johanna Goliszewski; Sophie Brown / Kate Robertshaw | 16; 21 | 7; 11 | | retired |
| 5 | (Germany) (England) | Luise Heim; Kirby Ngan | 21; 18 | 19; 21 | 21; 9 |

=== France vs. Wales ===
France
-
Kazan Gymnastics Center
17 February 2016, 18:00 UTC+3

Wales
Withdrew

| | | 1 | 2 | 3 |
|---|---|---|---|---|
| 1 | (France) (Wales) |
| 2 | (France) (Wales) |
| 3 | (France) (Wales) |
| 4 | (France) (Wales) |
| 5 | (France) (Wales) |

=== France vs. England ===
France
2
Kazan Gymnastics Center, Court 1
18 February 2016, 14:00 UTC+3

England
3

| | | | 1 | 2 | 3 |
|---|---|---|---|---|---|
| 1 | (France) (England) | Delphine Lansac; Fontaine Chapman | 23; 21 | 23; 21 |
| 2 | (France) (England) | Marie Batomene / Émilie Lefel; Heather Olver / Lauren Smith | 25; 23 | 17; 21 | 18; 21 |
| 3 | (France) (England) | Katia Normand; Chloe Birch | 14; 21 | 20; 22 |
| 4 | (France) (England) | Audrey Fontaine / Anne Tran; Sophie Brown / Kate Robertshaw | 16; 21 | 14; 21 |
| 5 | (France) (England) | Yaëlle Hoyaux; Kirby Ngan | 21; 16 | 22; 20 |

=== Germany vs. Wales ===
Germany
-
Kazan Gymnastics Center
18 February 2016, 14:00 UTC+3

Wales
Withdrew

| | | 1 | 2 | 3 |
|---|---|---|---|---|
| 1 | (Germany) (Wales) |
| 2 | (Germany) (Wales) |
| 3 | (Germany) (Wales) |
| 4 | (Germany) (Wales) |
| 5 | (Germany) (Wales) |

== Group 4 ==
| Pos | Team | Pld | W | L | MF | MA | MD | GF | GA | GD | PF | PA | PD | Pts | Qualification | Ukraine | Turkey | Czech Republic | Italy |
|---|---|---|---|---|---|---|---|---|---|---|---|---|---|---|---|---|---|---|---|
| 1 | Ukraine | 3 | 3 | 0 | 12 | 3 | +9 | 26 | 7 | +19 | 646 | 507 | +139 | 3 | Knockout stage | — | 3–2 | 4–1 | 5–0 |
| 2 | Turkey | 3 | 2 | 1 | 10 | 5 | +5 | 22 | 14 | +8 | 698 | 571 | +127 | 2 | Knockout stage | | — | 4–1 | 4–1 |
| 3 | Czech Republic | 3 | 1 | 2 | 7 | 8 | −1 | 16 | 16 | 0 | 562 | 565 | −3 | 1 | | | | — | 5–0 |
| 4 | Italy | 3 | 0 | 3 | 1 | 14 | −13 | 2 | 29 | −27 | 385 | 648 | −263 | 0 | | | | | — |

Source: TS

=== Turkey vs. Ukraine ===
Turkey
2
Kazan Gymnastics Center, Court 2
16 February 2016, 13:00 UTC+3

Ukraine
3

| | | | 1 | 2 | 3 |
|---|---|---|---|---|---|
| 1 | (Turkey) (Ukraine) | Neslihan Yiğit; Marija Ulitina | 14; 21 | 20; 22 |
| 2 | (Turkey) (Ukraine) | Özge Bayrak; Natalya Voytsekh | 21; 14 | 18; 21 | 21; 14 |
| 3 | (Turkey) (Ukraine) | Cemre Fere; Elena Prus | 21; 14 | 18; 21 | 16; 21 |
| 4 | (Turkey) (Ukraine) | Özge Bayrak / Neslihan Yiğit; Yuliya Kazarinova / Yelyzaveta Zharka | 22; 24 | 21; 9 | 21; 9 |
| 5 | (Turkey) (Ukraine) | Cemre Fere / Ebru Yazgan; Marija Ulitina / Natalya Voytsekh | 14; 21 | 11; 21 |

=== Czech Republic vs. Italy ===
Czech Republic
5
Kazan Gymnastics Center, Court 8
16 February 2016, 13:00 UTC+3

Italy
0

| | | | 1 | 2 | 3 |
|---|---|---|---|---|---|
| 1 | (Czech Republic) (Italy) | Kristína Gavnholt; Jeanine Cicognini | 21; 9 | 21; 12 |
| 2 | (Czech Republic) (Italy) | Zuzana Pavelková; Ramona Gloria Pirvanescu | 21; 19 | 21; 14 |
| 3 | (Czech Republic) (Italy) | Kateřina Tomalová; Lisa Iversen | 21; 16 | 21; 14 |
| 4 | (Czech Republic) (Italy) | Magdalena Lajdová / Denisa Šikalová; Giulia Fiorito / Ramona Gloria Pirvanescu | 21; 9 | 21; 12 |
| 5 | (Czech Republic) (Italy) | Kristína Gavnholt / Kateřina Tomalová; Silvia Garino / Lisa Iversen | 21; 13 | 21; 11 |

=== Turkey vs. Czech Republic ===
Turkey
4
Kazan Gymnastics Center, Court 2
17 February 2016, 18:00 UTC+3

Czech Republic
1

| | | | 1 | 2 | 3 |
|---|---|---|---|---|---|
| 1 | (Turkey) (Czech Republic) | Neslihan Yiğit; Kristína Gavnholt | 21; 19 | 17; 21 | 21; 18 |
| 2 | (Turkey) (Czech Republic) | Özge Bayrak; Zuzana Pavelková | 19; 21 | 21; 11 | 21; 15 |
| 3 | (Turkey) (Czech Republic) | Cemre Fere; Kateřina Tomalová | 21; 14 | 21; 13 |
| 4 | (Turkey) (Czech Republic) | Özge Bayrak / Neslihan Yiğit; Magdalena Lajdová / Denisa Šikalová | 21; 7 | 21; 15 |
| 5 | (Turkey) (Czech Republic) | Cemre Fere / Ebru Yazgan; Kristína Gavnholt / Kateřina Tomalová | 15; 21 | 13; 21 |

=== Ukraine vs. Italy ===
Ukraine
5
Kazan Gymnastics Center, Court 6
17 February 2016, 18:00 UTC+3

Italy
0

| | | | 1 | 2 | 3 |
|---|---|---|---|---|---|
| 1 | (Ukraine) (Italy) | Marija Ulitina; Ramona Gloria Pirvanescu | 21; 7 | 21; 9 |
| 2 | (Ukraine) (Italy) | Natalya Voytsekh; Lisa Iversen | 21; 9 | 21; 14 |
| 3 | (Ukraine) (Italy) | Elena Prus; Silvia Garino | 21; 17 | 21; 11 |
| 4 | (Ukraine) (Italy) | Natalya Voytsekh / Yelyzaveta Zharka; Jeanine Cicognini / Giulia Fiorito | 21; 11 | 21; 14 |
| 5 | (Ukraine) (Italy) | Yuliya Kazarinova / Elena Prus; Silvia Garino / Lisa Iversen | 21; 9 | 21; 12 |

=== Ukraine vs. Czech Republic ===
Ukraine
4
Kazan Gymnastics Center, Court 2
18 February 2016, 14:00 UTC+3

Czech Republic
1

| | | | 1 | 2 | 3 |
|---|---|---|---|---|---|
| 1 | (Ukraine) (Czech Republic) | Marija Ulitina; Kristina Gavnholt | 15; 21 | 20; 22 |
| 2 | (Ukraine) (Czech Republic) | Natalya Voytsekh; Zuzana Pavelkova | 21; 19 | 21; 11 |
| 3 | (Ukraine) (Czech Republic) | Elena Prus; Katerina Tomalova | 21; 19 | 22; 20 |
| 4 | (Ukraine) (Czech Republic) | Yuliya Kazarinova / Yelyzaveta Zharka; Magdalena Lajdova / Denisa Šikalová | 21; 6 | 21; 14 |
| 5 | (Ukraine) (Czech Republic) | Marija Ulitina / Natalya Voytsekh; Kristina Gavnholt / Katerina Tomalova | 21; 14 | 21; 10 |

=== Turkey vs. Italy ===
Turkey
4
Kazan Gymnastics Center, Court 4
18 February 2016, 14:00 UTC+3

Italy
1

| | | | 1 | 2 | 3 |
|---|---|---|---|---|---|
| 1 | (Turkey) (Italy) | Neslihan Yiğit; Jeanine Cicognini | 21; 13 | 20; 22 | 19; 21 |
| 2 | (Turkey) (Italy) | Özge Bayrak; Ramona Gloria Pirvanescu | 21; 12 | 21; 13 |
| 3 | (Turkey) (Italy) | Cemre Fere; Giulia Fiorito | 21; 10 | 21; 7 |
| 4 | (Turkey) (Italy) | Aliye Demirbağ / Kader İnal; Silvia Garino / Lisa Iversen | 21; 7 | 21; 14 |
| 5 | (Turkey) (Italy) | Özge Bayrak / Neslihan Yiğit; Jeanine Cicognini / Giulia Fiorito | 21; 12 | 21; 12 |

== Group 5 ==
| Pos | Team | Pld | W | L | MF | MA | MD | GF | GA | GD | PF | PA | PD | Pts | Qualification | Russia | Hungary | Ireland | Slovakia |
|---|---|---|---|---|---|---|---|---|---|---|---|---|---|---|---|---|---|---|---|
| 1 | Russia | 3 | 3 | 0 | 15 | 0 | +15 | 30 | 4 | +26 | 697 | 372 | +325 | 3 | Knockout stage | — | 5–0 | 5–0 | 5–0 |
| 2 | Hungary | 3 | 2 | 1 | 7 | 8 | −1 | 16 | 19 | −3 | 564 | 654 | −90 | 2 | | | — | 3–2 | 4–1 |
| 3 | Ireland | 3 | 1 | 2 | 6 | 9 | −3 | 15 | 19 | −4 | 576 | 624 | −48 | 1 | | | | — | 4–1 |
| 4 | Slovakia | 3 | 0 | 3 | 2 | 13 | −11 | 8 | 27 | −19 | 511 | 698 | −187 | 0 | | | | | — |

Source: TS

=== Russia vs. Ireland ===
Russia
5
Kazan Gymnastics Center, Court 3
16 February 2016, 13:00 UTC+3

Ireland
0

| | | | 1 | 2 | 3 |
|---|---|---|---|---|---|
| 1 | (Russia) (Republic of Ireland) | Ksenia Polikarpova; Chloe Magee | 16; 21 | 21; 12 | 21; 14 |
| 2 | (Russia) (Republic of Ireland) | Natalia Perminova; Sara Boyle | 21; 11 | 21; 9 |
| 3 | (Russia) (Republic of Ireland) | Elena Komendrovskaja; Rachael Darragh | 21; 11 | 21; 12 |
| 4 | (Russia) (Republic of Ireland) | Evgenia Dimova / Nina Vislova; Chloe Magee / Sinead Chambers | 21; 12 | 21; 16 |
| 5 | (Russia) (Republic of Ireland) | Ekaterina Bolotova / Evgeniya Kosetskaya; Sara Boyle / Rachael Darragh | 21; 7 | 21; 7 |

=== Slovakia vs. Hungary ===
Slovakia
1
Kazan Gymnastics Center, Court 6
16 February 2016, 13:00 UTC+3

Hungary
4

| | | | 1 | 2 | 3 |
|---|---|---|---|---|---|
| 1 | (Slovakia) (Hungary) | Jana Čižnárová; Laura Sárosi | 14; 21 | 18; 21 |
| 2 | (Slovakia) (Hungary) | Martina Repiská; Daniella Gonda | 21; 13 | 21; 17 |
| 3 | (Slovakia) (Hungary) | Katarína Vargová; Ágnes Kőrösi | 13; 21 | 21; 12 | 19; 21 |
| 4 | (Slovakia) (Hungary) | Jana Čižnárová / Martina Repiská; Daniella Gonda / Orsolya Varga | 20; 22 | 14; 21 |
| 5 | (Slovakia) (Hungary) | Zuzana Palková / Katarína Vargová; Ágnes Kőrösi / Laura Sárosi | 21; 17 | 10; 21 | 17; 21 |

=== Russia vs. Slovakia ===
Russia
5
Kazan Gymnastics Center, Court 3
17 February 2016, 18:00 UTC+3

Slovakia
0

| | | | 1 | 2 | 3 |
|---|---|---|---|---|---|
| 1 | (Russia) (Slovakia) | Natalia Perminova; Jana Čižnárová | 21; 9 | 21; 9 |
| 2 | (Russia) (Slovakia) | Elena Komendrovskaja; Martina Repiská | 21; 14 | 21; 12 |
| 3 | (Russia) (Slovakia) | Evgeniya Kosetskaya; Katarína Vargová | 21; 5 | 18; 21 | 21; 7 |
| 4 | (Russia) (Slovakia) | Anastasiia Akchurina / Olga Morozova; Jana Čižnárová / Martina Repiská | 21; 1 | 21; 5 |
| 5 | (Russia) (Slovakia) | Tatjana Bibik / Evgenia Dimova; Zuzana Palková / Katarína Vargová | 21; 11 | 21; 4 |

=== Ireland vs. Hungary ===
Ireland
2
Kazan Gymnastics Center, Court 7
17 February 2016, 18:00 UTC+3

Hungary
3

| | | | 1 | 2 | 3 |
|---|---|---|---|---|---|
| 1 | (Republic of Ireland) (Hungary) | Chloe Magee; Daniella Gonda | 21; 12 | 21; 11 |
| 2 | (Republic of Ireland) (Hungary) | Sara Boyle; Ágnes Kőrösi | 18; 21 | 21; 18 | 10; 21 |
| 3 | (Republic of Ireland) (Hungary) | Rachael Darragh; Orsolya Varga | 21; 23 | 17; 21 |
| 4 | (Republic of Ireland) (Hungary) | Sinead Chambers / Chloe Magee; Ágnes Kőrösi / Laura Sárosi | 21; 13 | 21; 12 |
| 5 | (Republic of Ireland) (Hungary) | Sara Boyle / Rachael Darragh; Daniella Gonda / Orsolya Varga | 12; 21 | 19; 21 |

=== Russia vs. Hungary ===
Russia
5
Kazan Gymnastics Center, Court 3
18 February 2016, 14:00 UTC+3

Hungary
0

| | | | 1 | 2 | 3 |
|---|---|---|---|---|---|
| 1 | (Russia) (Hungary) | Ksenia Polikarpova; Daniella Gonda | 16; 21 | 21; 9 | 21; 4 |
| 2 | (Russia) (Hungary) | Natalia Perminova; Ágnes Kőrösi | 21; 11 | 21; 16 |
| 3 | (Russia) (Hungary) | Elena Komendrovskaja; Orsolya Varga | 21; 10 | 21; 7 |
| 4 | (Russia) (Hungary) | Tatjana Bibik / Evgenia Dimova; Ágnes Kőrösi / Laura Sárosi | 21; 11 | 17; 21 | 21; 11 |
| 5 | (Russia) (Hungary) | Ekaterina Bolotova / Evgeniya Kosetskaya; Daniella Gonda / Orsolya Varga | 21; 7 | 21; 14 |

=== Ireland vs. Slovakia ===
Ireland
4
Kazan Gymnastics Center, Court 5
18 February 2016, 14:00 UTC+3

Slovakia
1

| | | | 1 | 2 | 3 |
|---|---|---|---|---|---|
| 1 | (Republic of Ireland) (Slovakia) | Chloe Magee; Jana Čižnárová | 21; 12 | 21; 12 |
| 2 | (Republic of Ireland) (Slovakia) | Sara Boyle; Martina Repiská | 16; 21 | 21; 17 | 17; 21 |
| 3 | (Republic of Ireland) (Slovakia) | Sinead Chambers; Katarína Vargová | 21; 18 | 17; 21 | 21; 15 |
| 4 | (Republic of Ireland) (Slovakia) | Sara Boyle / Rachael Darragh; Zuzana Palková / Martina Repiská | 21; 15 | 24; 22 |
| 5 | (Republic of Ireland) (Slovakia) | Sinead Chambers / Chloe Magee; Jana Čižnárová / Katarína Vargová | 21; 13 | 21; 17 |
