= 2016 European Men's Team Badminton Championships group stage =

This article lists the full results for group stage of 2016 European Men's Team Badminton Championships. The group stage was held from 16 to 18 February 2016.

== Group 1 ==
Pos	Team	Pld	W	L	MF	MA	MD	GF	GA	GD	PF	PA	PD	Pts	Qualification	Denmark	Croatia	Finland	Turkey
1	Denmark	3	3	0	15	0	+15	29	1	+28	607	366	+241	3	Knockout stage	—	5–0	5–0	5–0
2	Croatia	3	2	1	6	9	−3	15	19	−4	565	608	−43	2			—	3–2	3–2
3	Finland	3	1	2	7	8	−1	16	16	0	531	529	+2	1				—	5–0
4	Turkey	3	0	3	2	13	−11	4	28	−24	454	654	−200	0					—

Source: TS

=== Denmark vs. Turkey ===
Denmark
5
Kazan Gymnastics Center, Court 3
16 February 2016, 09:00 UTC+3

Turkey
0

			1	2	3
1	(Denmark) (Turkey)	Jan Ø. Jørgensen; Muhammed Ali Kurt	21; 11	21; 12
2	(Denmark) (Turkey)	Mathias Boe / Carsten Mogensen; Yusuf Ramazan Bay / Sinan Zorlu	21; 5	21; 14
3	(Denmark) (Turkey)	Viktor Axelsen; Emre Lale	21; 15	21; 8
4	(Denmark) (Turkey)	Kim Astrup / Anders Skaarup Rasmussen; Haktan Doğan / Osman Uyhan	21; 13	21; 4
5	(Denmark) (Turkey)	Emil Holst; Murat Şen	21; 19	21; 18

=== Croatia vs. Finland ===
Croatia
3
Kazan Gymnastics Center, Court 2
16 February 2016, 09:00 UTC+3

Finland
2

			1	2	3
1	(Croatia) (Finland)	Zvonimir Đurkinjak; Eetu Heino	21; 19	21; 17
2	(Croatia) (Finland)	Josip Uglesić; Kalle Koljonen	11; 21	21; 12	10; 21
3	(Croatia) (Finland)	Filip Špoljarec; Anton Kaisti	6; 21	10; 21
4	(Croatia) (Finland)	Igor Čimbur / Zvonimir Hölbling; Henri Aarnio / Iikka Heino	21; 11	22; 24	21; 13
5	(Croatia) (Finland)	Zvonimir Đurkinjak / Filip Špoljarec; Eetu Heino / Kalle Koljonen	21; 7	21; 12

=== Turkey vs. Finland ===
Turkey
0
Kazan Gymnastics Center, Court 2
17 February 2016, 10:00 UTC+3

Finland
5

			1	2	3
1	(Turkey) (Finland)	Muhammed Ali Kurt; Eetu Heino	10; 21	13; 21
2	(Turkey) (Finland)	Emre Lale; Kalle Koljonen	17; 21	6; 21
3	(Turkey) (Finland)	Murat Şen; Anton Kaisti	16; 21	8; 21
4	(Turkey) (Finland)	Haktan Doğan / Osman Uyhan; Henri Aarnio / Iikka Heino	18; 21	16; 21
5	(Turkey) (Finland)	Yusuf Ramazan Bay / Sinan Zorlu; Eetu Heino / Anton Kaisti	15; 21	17; 21

=== Denmark vs. Croatia ===
Denmark
5
Kazan Gymnastics Center, Court 3
17 February 2016, 10:00 UTC+3

Croatia
0

			1	2	3
1	(Denmark) (Croatia)	Viktor Axelsen; Zvonimir Đurkinjak	21; 12	21; 14
2	(Denmark) (Croatia)	Kim Astrup / Anders Skaarup Rasmussen; Igor Čimbur / Filip Špoljarec	21; 11	21; 14
3	(Denmark) (Croatia)	Hans-Kristian Vittinghus; Josip Uglesić	21; 8	21; 10
4	(Denmark) (Croatia)	Mads Conrad-Petersen / Mads Pieler Kolding; Zvonimir Đurkinjak / Zvonimir Hölbling	21; 12	21; 16
5	(Denmark) (Croatia)	Anders Antonsen; Filip Špoljarec	21; 11	21; 17

=== Denmark vs. Finland ===
Denmark
5
Kazan Gymnastics Center, Court 2
18 February 2016, 18:00 UTC+3

Finland
0

			1	2	3
1	(Denmark) (Finland)	Jan Ø. Jørgensen; Ville Lång	1; 0			retired
2	(Denmark) (Finland)	Viktor Axelsen; Eetu Heino	21; 11	21; 11
3	(Denmark) (Finland)	Kim Astrup / Anders Skaarup Rasmussen; Henri Aarnio / Iikka Heino	21; 11	21; 9
4	(Denmark) (Finland)	Hans-Kristian Vittinghus; Kalle Koljonen	15; 21	21; 6	24; 22
5	(Denmark) (Finland)	Mads Conrad-Petersen / Mads Pieler Kolding; Eetu Heino / Anton Kaisti	21; 14	21; 17

=== Turkey vs. Croatia ===
Turkey
2
Kazan Gymnastics Center, Court 4
18 February 2016, 18:00 UTC+3

Croatia
3

			1	2	3
1	(Turkey) (Croatia)	Muhammed Ali Kurt; Zvonimir Đurkinjak	15; 21	6; 21
2	(Turkey) (Croatia)	Emre Lale; Josip Uglesić	17; 21	21; 13	21; 18
3	(Turkey) (Croatia)	Murat Şen; Filip Špoljarec	14; 21	19; 21
4	(Turkey) (Croatia)	Yusuf Ramazan Bay / Sinan Zorlu; Igor Čimbur / Zvonimir Hölbling	21; 17	10; 21	21; 18
5	(Turkey) (Croatia)	Haktan Doğan / Osman Uyhan; Zvonimir Đurkinjak / Filip Špoljarec	18; 21	16; 21

== Group 2 ==
Pos	Team	Pld	W	L	MF	MA	MD	GF	GA	GD	PF	PA	PD	Pts	Qualification	England	Bulgaria	Estonia	Hungary
1	England	3	3	0	14	1	+13	29	2	+27	654	362	+292	3	Knockout stage	—	4–1	5–0	5–0
2	Bulgaria	3	2	1	7	8	−1	16	20	−4	641	673	−32	2			—	3–2	3–2
3	Estonia	3	1	2	5	10	−5	13	22	−9	573	700	−127	1				—	3–2
4	Hungary	3	0	3	4	11	−7	11	25	−14	562	695	−133	0					—

Source: TS

=== Bulgaria vs. Hungary ===
Bulgaria
3
Kazan Gymnastics Center, Court 4
16 February 2016, 09:00 UTC+3

Hungary
2

			1	2	3
1	(Bulgaria) (Hungary)	Blagovest Kisyov; Gergely Krausz	13; 21	16; 21
2	(Bulgaria) (Hungary)	Ivan Rusev; Bence Pytel	18; 21	21; 11	21; 5
3	(Bulgaria) (Hungary)	Peyo Boichinov; Márton Szerecz	19; 21	21; 10	12; 21
4	(Bulgaria) (Hungary)	Daniel Nikolov / Ivan Rusev; Gergely Krausz / Márton Szatzker	17; 21	21; 19	22; 20
5	(Bulgaria) (Hungary)	Peyo Boichinov / Philip Shishov; Márton Szerecz / Csaba Szikra	21; 12	21; 10

=== England vs. Estonia ===
England
5
Kazan Gymnastics Center, Court 6
16 February 2016, 18:00 UTC+3

Estonia
0

			1	2	3
1	(England) (Estonia)	Rajiv Ouseph; Raul Must	21; 13	21; 19
2	(England) (Estonia)	Toby Penty; Heiko Zoober	21; 7	21; 14
3	(England) (Estonia)	Sam Parsons; Mikk Õunmaa	21; 10	21; 5
4	(England) (Estonia)	Marcus Ellis / Chris Langridge; Kristjan Kaljurand / Raul Käsner	21; 6	21; 10
5	(England) (Estonia)	Peter Briggs / Tom Wolfenden; Mikk Õunmaa / Heiko Zoober	21; 9	21; 12

=== England vs. Bulgaria ===
England
4
Kazan Gymnastics Center, Court 5
17 February 2016, 14:00 UTC+3

Bulgaria
1

			1	2	3
1	(England) (Bulgaria)	Rajiv Ouseph; Blagovest Kisyov	21; 13	21; 8
2	(England) (Bulgaria)	Toby Penty; Ivan Rusev	21; 13	21; 9
3	(England) (Bulgaria)	Rhys Walker; Daniel Nikolov	21; 10	16; 21	28; 30
4	(England) (Bulgaria)	Peter Briggs / Peter Mills; Peyo Boichinov / Philip Shishov	21; 11	21; 9
5	(England) (Bulgaria)	Marcus Ellis / Chris Langridge; Daniel Nikolov / Ivan Rusev	21; 13	22; 20

=== Estonia vs. Hungary ===
Estonia
3
Kazan Gymnastics Center, Court 8
17 February 2016, 14:00 UTC+3

Hungary
2

			1	2	3
1	(Estonia) (Hungary)	Raul Must; Gergely Krausz	13; 21	21; 12	21; 15
2	(Estonia) (Hungary)	Heiko Zoober; Bence Pytel	16; 21	21; 17	15; 21
3	(Estonia) (Hungary)	Mikk Õunmaa; Márton Szerecz	8; 21	21; 19	17; 21
4	(Estonia) (Hungary)	Kristjan Kaljurand / Raul Käsner; Gergely Krausz / Márton Szatzker	25; 23	21; 19
5	(Estonia) (Hungary)	Mikk Õunmaa / Heiko Zoober; Márton Szerecz / Csaba Szikra	21; 19	22; 20

=== England vs. Hungary ===
England
5
Kazan Gymnastics Center, Court 3
18 February 2016, 10:00 UTC+3

Hungary
0

			1	2	3
1	(England) (Hungary)	Rajiv Ouseph; Gergely Krausz	21; 15	21; 10
2	(England) (Hungary)	Peter Briggs / Tom Wolfenden; Márton Szerecz / Csaba Szikra	21; 11	21; 3
3	(England) (Hungary)	Toby Penty; Bence Pytel	21; 8	21; 11
4	(England) (Hungary)	Marcus Ellis / Chris Langridge; Gergely Krausz / Márton Szatzker	21; 8	21; 12
5	(England) (Hungary)	Sam Parsons; Márton Szerecz	21; 10	21; 12

=== Estonia vs. Bulgaria ===
Estonia
2
Kazan Gymnastics Center, Court 4
18 February 2016, 10:00 UTC+3

Bulgaria
3

			1	2	3
1	(Estonia) (Bulgaria)	Raul Must; Blagovest Kisyov	21; 18	21; 18
2	(Estonia) (Bulgaria)	Heiko Zoober; Ivan Rusev	17; 21	14; 21
3	(Estonia) (Bulgaria)	Mikk Õunmaa; Philip Shishov	22; 24	13; 21
4	(Estonia) (Bulgaria)	Kristjan Kaljurand / Raul Käsner; Daniel Nikolov / Ivan Rusev	21; 23	21; 18	21; 15
5	(Estonia) (Bulgaria)	Mikk Õunmaa / Heiko Zoober; Peyo Boichinov / Philip Shishov	21; 18	21; 23	13; 21

== Group 3 ==
Pos	Team	Pld	W	L	MF	MA	MD	GF	GA	GD	PF	PA	PD	Pts	Qualification	Germany	Czech Republic	Ireland	Lithuania
1	Germany	3	3	0	14	1	+13	29	4	+25	671	434	+237	3	Knockout stage	—	4–1	5–0	5–0
2	Czech Republic	3	2	1	9	6	+3	19	15	+4	619	570	+49	2			—	3–2	5–0
3	Ireland	3	1	2	6	9	−3	12	18	−6	490	530	−40	1				—	4–1
4	Lithuania	3	0	3	1	14	−13	5	28	−23	421	667	−246	0					—

Source: TS

=== Germany vs. Lithuania ===
Germany
5
Kazan Gymnastics Center, Court 7
16 February 2016, 13:00 UTC+3

Lithuania
0

			1	2	3
1	(Germany) (Lithuania)	Dieter Domke; Kęstutis Navickas	21; 17	21; 14
2	(Germany) (Lithuania)	Kai Schäfer; Povilas Bartušis	21; 6	19; 21	21; 7
3	(Germany) (Lithuania)	Mark Lamsfuß / Josche Zurwonne; Karolis Eimutaitis / Edgaras Slušnys	21; 11	21; 8
4	(Germany) (Lithuania)	Lars Schänzler; Mark Šames	21; 6	21; 8
5	(Germany) (Lithuania)	Raphael Beck / Peter Käsbauer; Povilas Bartušis / Kęstutis Navickas	21; 6	21; 11

=== Ireland vs. Czech Republic ===
Ireland
2
Kazan Gymnastics Center, Court 1
16 February 2016, 18:00 UTC+3

Czech Republic
3

			1	2	3
1	(Republic of Ireland) (Czech Republic)	Scott Evans; Milan Ludík	21; 19	21; 16
2	(Republic of Ireland) (Czech Republic)	Joshua Magee; Petr Koukal	12; 21	9; 21
3	(Republic of Ireland) (Czech Republic)	Nhat Nguyen; Adam Mendrek	16; 21	14; 21
4	(Republic of Ireland) (Czech Republic)	Joshua Magee / Sam Magee; Jakub Bitman / Pavel Drančák	21; 15	21; 13
5	(Republic of Ireland) (Czech Republic)	Nhat Nguyen / Paul Reynolds; Jan Fröhlich / Milan Ludík	14; 21	14; 21

=== Germany vs. Ireland ===
Germany
5
Kazan Gymnastics Center, Court 3
17 February 2016, 14:00 UTC+3

Ireland
0

			1	2	3
1	(Germany) (Republic of Ireland)	Marc Zwiebler; Scott Evans	21; 15	21; 11
2	(Germany) (Republic of Ireland)	Dieter Domke; Joshua Magee	21; 13	21; 5
3	(Germany) (Republic of Ireland)	Lars Schänzler; Nhat Nguyen	21; 18	21; 16
4	(Germany) (Republic of Ireland)	Michael Fuchs / Josche Zurwonne; Joshua Magee / Sam Magee	21; 14	21; 10
5	(Germany) (Republic of Ireland)	Raphael Beck / Peter Käsbauer; Nhat Nguyen / Paul Reynolds	21; 15	21; 13

=== Lithuania vs. Czech Republic ===
Lithuania
0
Kazan Gymnastics Center, Court 4
17 February 2016, 14:00 UTC+3

Czech Republic
5

			1	2	3
1	(Lithuania) (Czech Republic)	Kęstutis Navickas; Milan Ludík	19; 21	21; 16	15; 21
2	(Lithuania) (Czech Republic)	Povilas Bartušis; Petr Koukal	8; 21	11; 21
3	(Lithuania) (Czech Republic)	Karolis Eimutaitis / Edgaras Slušnys; Jakub Bitman / Pavel Drančák	17; 21	12; 21
4	(Lithuania) (Czech Republic)	Mark Šames; Adam Mendrek	14; 21	12; 21
5	(Lithuania) (Czech Republic)	Povilas Bartušis / Kęstutis Navickas; Jan Fröhlich / Petr Koukal	14; 21	21; 15	11; 21

=== Germany vs. Czech Republic ===
Germany
4
Kazan Gymnastics Center, Court 3
18 February 2016, 18:00 UTC+3

Czech Republic
1

			1	2	3
1	(Germany) (Czech Republic)	Marc Zwiebler; Milan Ludík	21; 13	21; 16
2	(Germany) (Czech Republic)	Dieter Domke; Petr Koukal	16; 21	21; 15	21; 15
3	(Germany) (Czech Republic)	Lars Schänzler; Jan Fröhlich	15; 21	21; 18	12; 21
4	(Germany) (Czech Republic)	Mark Lamsfuß / Marvin Seidel; Petr Koukal / Adam Mendrek	21; 13	21; 14
5	(Germany) (Czech Republic)	Michael Fuchs / Josche Zurwonne; Pavel Drančák / Jan Fröhlich	21; 6	21; 16

=== Lithuania vs. Ireland ===
Lithuania
1
Kazan Gymnastics Center, Court 6
18 February 2016, 18:00 UTC+3

Ireland
4

			1	2	3
1	(Lithuania) (Republic of Ireland)	Kęstutis Navickas; Scott Evans	21; 19	6; 5		retired
2	(Lithuania) (Republic of Ireland)	Povilas Bartušis; Joshua Magee	15; 21	24; 26
3	(Lithuania) (Republic of Ireland)	Mark Šames; Nhat Nguyen	10; 21	4; 21
4	(Lithuania) (Republic of Ireland)	Povilas Bartušis / Kęstutis Navickas; Joshua Magee / Sam Magee	14; 21	8; 21
5	(Lithuania) (Republic of Ireland)	Karolis Eimutaitis / Edgaras Slušnys; Nhat Nguyen / Paul Reynolds	11; 21	18; 21

== Group 4 ==
Pos	Team	Pld	W	L	MF	MA	MD	GF	GA	GD	PF	PA	PD	Pts	Qualification	France	Sweden	Scotland	Slovakia
1	France	3	3	0	12	3	+9	26	7	+19	671	471	+200	3	Knockout stage	—	3–2	4–1	5–0
2	Sweden	3	2	1	11	4	+7	22	10	+12	607	490	+117	2	Knockout stage		—	4–1	5–0
3	Scotland	3	1	2	7	8	−1	16	18	−2	584	622	−38	1				—	5–0
4	Slovakia	3	0	3	0	15	−15	1	30	−29	368	647	−279	0					—

Source: TS

=== Sweden vs. Slovakia ===
Sweden
5
Kazan Gymnastics Center, Court 5
16 February 2016, 09:00 UTC+3

Slovakia
0

			1	2	3
1	(Sweden) (Slovakia)	Henri Hurskainen; Matej Hliničan	21; 3	21; 12
2	(Sweden) (Slovakia)	Mattias Borg; Milan Dratva	21; 17	21; 7
3	(Sweden) (Slovakia)	Mikael Westerbäck; Juraj Vachálek	21; 10	21; 12
4	(Sweden) (Slovakia)	Filip Michael Duwall Myhren / Jonatan Nordh; Milan Dratva / Bohumil Kašela	21; 10	21; 8
5	(Sweden) (Slovakia)	Richard Eidestedt / Nico Ruponen; Matej Hliničan / Juraj Vachálek	21; 16	21; 9

=== France vs. Scotland ===
France
4
Kazan Gymnastics Center, Court 4
16 February 2016, 13:00 UTC+3

Scotland
1

			1	2	3
1	(France) (Scotland)	Brice Leverdez; Kieran Merrilees	21; 12	21; 15
2	(France) (Scotland)	Bastian Kersaudy / Gaëtan Mittelheisser; Martin Campbell / Patrick MacHugh	21; 19	21; 12
3	(France) (Scotland)	Lucas Corvée; Matthew Carder	21; 23	21; 7	21; 6
4	(France) (Scotland)	Julien Maio / Ronan Labar; Robert Blair / Adam Hall	21; 19	19; 21	16; 21
5	(France) (Scotland)	Lucas Claerbout; Ben Torrance	21; 14	21; 18

=== France vs. Sweden ===
France
3
Kazan Gymnastics Center, Court 1
17 February 2016, 10:00 UTC+3

Sweden
2

			1	2	3
1	(France) (Sweden)	Brice Leverdez; Henri Hurskainen	15; 21	17; 21
2	(France) (Sweden)	Bastian Kersaudy / Gaëtan Mittelheisser; Richard Eidestedt / Nico Ruponen	21; 19	21; 12
3	(France) (Sweden)	Lucas Corvée; Mattias Borg	20; 22	21; 15	17; 21
4	(France) (Sweden)	Julien Maio / Ronan Labar; Filip Michael Duwall Myhren / Jonatan Nordh	21; 6	21; 12
5	(France) (Sweden)	Lucas Claerbout; Mikael Westerbäck	21; 16	21; 10

=== Scotland vs. Slovakia ===
Scotland
5
Kazan Gymnastics Center, Court 4
17 February 2016, 10:00 UTC+3

Slovakia
0

			1	2	3
1	(Scotland) (Slovakia)	Kieran Merrilees; Matej Hliničan	21; 7	21; 15
2	(Scotland) (Slovakia)	Matthew Carder; Milan Dratva	21; 15	21; 12
3	(Scotland) (Slovakia)	Alexander Dunn; Juraj Vachálek	23; 21	15; 21	21; 16
4	(Scotland) (Slovakia)	Martin Campbell / Patrick MacHugh; Matej Hliničan / Juraj Vachálek	21; 8	21; 6
5	(Scotland) (Slovakia)	Adam Hall / Alexander Dunn; Milan Dratva / Bohumil Kašela	21; 17	21; 17

=== Scotland vs. Sweden ===
Scotland
1
Kazan Gymnastics Center, Court 1
18 February 2016, 10:00 UTC+3

Sweden
4

			1	2	3
1	(Scotland) (Sweden)	Kieran Merrilees; Henri Hurskainen	19; 21	8; 21
2	(Scotland) (Sweden)	Martin Campbell / Patrick MacHugh; Richard Eidestedt / Nico Ruponen	21; 17	18; 21	16; 21
3	(Scotland) (Sweden)	Matthew Carder; Mattias Borg	9; 21	17; 21
4	(Scotland) (Sweden)	Robert Blair / Adam Hall; Filip Michael Duwall Myhren / Jonatan Nordh	21; 18	21; 19
5	(Scotland) (Sweden)	Ben Torrance; Jacob Nilsson	9; 21	11; 21

=== France vs. Slovakia ===
France
5
Kazan Gymnastics Center, Court 5
18 February 2016, 10:00 UTC+3

Slovakia
0

			1	2	3
1	(France) (Slovakia)	Thomas Rouxel; Matej Hliničan	21; 12	21; 13
2	(France) (Slovakia)	Lucas Claerbout; Milan Dratva	21; 4	21; 12
3	(France) (Slovakia)	Toma Junior Popov; Juraj Vachálek	21; 16	21; 9
4	(France) (Slovakia)	Jordan Corvée / Ronan Labar; Bohumil Kašela / Milan Dratva	21; 17	21; 9
5	(France) (Slovakia)	Bastian Kersaudy / Gaëtan Mittelheisser; Matej Hliničan / Juraj Vachálek	21; 7	21; 10

== Group 5 ==
Pos	Team	Pld	W	L	MF	MA	MD	GF	GA	GD	PF	PA	PD	Pts	Qualification	Russia	Ukraine	Austria	Slovenia
1	Russia	3	3	0	11	4	+7	23	10	+13	638	494	+144	3	Knockout stage	—	3–2	4–1	4–1
2	Ukraine	3	2	1	11	4	+7	22	12	+10	628	586	+42	2	Knockout stage		—	4–1	5–0
3	Austria	3	1	2	5	10	−5	14	20	−6	591	650	−59	1				—	3–2
4	Slovenia	3	0	3	3	12	−9	9	26	−17	572	699	−127	0					—

Source: TS

=== Austria vs. Ukraine ===
Austria
1
Kazan Gymnastics Center, Court 5
16 February 2016, 18:00 UTC+3

Ukraine
4

			1	2	3
1	(Austria) (Ukraine)	David Obernosterer; Dmytro Zavadsky	21; 19	11; 21	12; 21
2	(Austria) (Ukraine)	Luka Wraber; Valeriy Atrashchenkov	12; 21	19; 21
3	(Austria) (Ukraine)	Vilson Vattanirappel; Kyrylo Leonov	10; 21	18; 21
4	(Austria) (Ukraine)	Dominik Stipsits / Roman Zirnwald; Valeriy Atrashchenkov / Gennadiy Natarov	21; 19	23; 25	18; 21
5	(Austria) (Ukraine)	David Obernosterer / Vilson Vattanirappel; Dmytro Zavadsky / Kyrylo Leonov	21; 12	21; 17

=== Russia vs. Slovenia ===
Russia
4
Kazan Gymnastics Center, Court 3
16 February 2016, 18:00 UTC+3

Slovenia
1

			1	2	3
1	(Russia) (Slovenia)	Vladimir Malkov; Iztok Utroša	22; 20	16; 21	21; 12
2	(Russia) (Slovenia)	Anatoliy Yartsev; Alen Roj	21; 15	16; 21	15; 21
3	(Russia) (Slovenia)	Sergey Sirant; Miha Ivanič	21; 11	21; 12
4	(Russia) (Slovenia)	Rodion Kargaev / Denis Grachev; Martin Cerkovnik / Alen Roj	21; 18	21; 14
5	(Russia) (Slovenia)	Vladimir Ivanov / Ivan Sozonov; Miha Ivanič / Iztok Utroša	21; 8	21; 10

=== Russia vs. Austria ===
Russia
4
Kazan Gymnastics Center, Court 1
17 February 2016, 14:00 UTC+3

Austria
1

			1	2	3
1	(Russia) (Austria)	Vladimir Malkov; David Obernosterer	19; 21	19; 21
2	(Russia) (Austria)	Sergey Sirant; Luka Wraber	18; 21	21; 14	21; 19
3	(Russia) (Austria)	Denis Grachev; Vilson Vattanirappel	21; 13	21; 9
4	(Russia) (Austria)	Evgenij Dremin / Ivan Sozonov; Dominik Stipsits / Roman Zirnwald	21; 13	21; 11
5	(Russia) (Austria)	Vladimir Ivanov / Vasily Kuznetsov; Vilson Vattanirappel / Luka Wraber	21; 15	21; 8

=== Slovenia vs. Ukraine ===
Slovenia
0
Kazan Gymnastics Center, Court 7
17 February 2016, 14:00 UTC+3

Ukraine
5

			1	2	3
1	(Slovenia) (Ukraine)	Iztok Utroša; Dmytro Zavadsky	21; 15	11; 21	17; 21
2	(Slovenia) (Ukraine)	Alen Roj; Artem Pochtarov	18; 21	18; 21
3	(Slovenia) (Ukraine)	Martin Cerkovnik; Valeriy Atrashchenkov	7; 21	16; 21
4	(Slovenia) (Ukraine)	Alen Roj / Iztok Utroša; Valeriy Atrashchenkov / Artem Pochtarov	15; 21	18; 21
5	(Slovenia) (Ukraine)	Martin Cerkovnik / Miha Ivanič; Gennadiy Natarov / Dmytro Zavadsky	21; 16	19; 21	21; 23

=== Russia vs. Ukraine ===
Russia
3
Kazan Gymnastics Center, Court 1
18 February 2016, 18:00 UTC+3

Ukraine
2

			1	2	3
1	(Russia) (Ukraine)	Vladimir Malkov; Dmytro Zavadsky	21; 9	21; 14
2	(Russia) (Ukraine)	Anatoliy Yartsev; Artem Pochtarov	15; 21	13; 21
3	(Russia) (Ukraine)	Denis Grachev; Valeriy Atrashchenkov	11; 21	12; 21
4	(Russia) (Ukraine)	Vladimir Ivanov / Vasily Kuznetsov; Kyrylo Leonov / Gennadiy Natarov	21; 5	21; 9
5	(Russia) (Ukraine)	Evgenij Dremin / Ivan Sozonov; Valeriy Atrashchenkov / Artem Pochtarov	21; 10	21; 15

=== Slovenia vs. Austria ===
Slovenia
2
Kazan Gymnastics Center, Court 7
18 February 2016, 18:00 UTC+3

Austria
3

			1	2	3
1	(Slovenia) (Austria)	Iztok Utroša; David Obernosterer	21; 18	21; 18
2	(Slovenia) (Austria)	Alen Roj; Luka Wraber	11; 21	12; 21
3	(Slovenia) (Austria)	Miha Ivanič; Vilson Vattanirappel	16; 21	18; 21
4	(Slovenia) (Austria)	Miha Ivanič / Iztok Utroša; Dominik Stipsits / Roman Zirnwald	17; 21	21; 17	21; 19
5	(Slovenia) (Austria)	Martin Cerkovnik / Alen Roj; David Obernosterer / Vilson Vattanirappel	15; 21	14; 21

== Group 6 ==
Pos	Team	Pld	W	L	MF	MA	MD	GF	GA	GD	PF	PA	PD	Pts	Qualification	Poland	Spain	Belgium	Norway	Italy
1	Poland	4	4	0	19	1	+18	36	6	+30	852	621	+231	4	Knockout stage	—	4–0	5–0	5–0	5–0
2	Spain	4	3	1	13	7	+6	30	17	+13	875	797	+78	3			—	3–2	5–0	4–1
3	Belgium	4	2	2	12	8	+4	26	20	+6	840	766	+74	2				—	5–0	5–0
4	Norway	4	1	3	3	17	−14	11	34	−23	703	896	−193	1					—	3–2
5	Italy	4	0	4	3	17	−14	10	36	−26	719	909	−190	0						—

Source: TS

=== Poland vs. Norway ===
Poland
5
Kazan Gymnastics Center, Court 7
16 February 2016, 09:00 UTC+3

Norway
0

			1	2	3
1	(Poland) (Norway)	Adrian Dziółko; Marius Myhre	21; 13	21; 19
2	(Poland) (Norway)	Adam Cwalina / Przemysław Wacha; Fredrik Kristensen / Jesper Kristensen	21; 4	22; 20
3	(Poland) (Norway)	Michał Rogalski; Torjus Flåtten	21; 12	21; 14
4	(Poland) (Norway)	Miłosz Bochat / Łukasz Moreń; Magnus Christensen / Vegard Rikheim	21; 15	21; 13
5	(Poland) (Norway)	Mateusz Dubowski; Peter Rønn Stensæth	21; 19	22; 20

=== Belgium vs. Italy ===
Belgium
5
Kazan Gymnastics Center, Court 9
16 February 2016, 09:00 UTC+3

Italy
0

			1	2	3
1	(Belgium) (Italy)	Yuhan Tan; Rosario Maddaloni	21; 19	21; 15
2	(Belgium) (Italy)	Maxime Moreels; Giovanni Greco	21; 13	21; 10
3	(Belgium) (Italy)	Birger Abts; Matteo Bellucci	21; 17	21; 17
4	(Belgium) (Italy)	Matijs Dierickx / Freek Golinski; Giovanni Greco / Rosario Maddaloni	21; 13	21; 13
5	(Belgium) (Italy)	Birger Abts / Nathan Vervaeke; Matteo Bellucci / Kevin Strobl	21; 15	21; 12

=== Poland vs. Belgium ===
Poland
5
Kazan Gymnastics Center, Court 4
16 February 2016, 18:00 UTC+3

Belgium
0

			1	2	3
1	(Poland) (Belgium)	Adrian Dziółko; Yuhan Tan	21; 17	21; 14
2	(Poland) (Belgium)	Michał Rogalski; Maxime Moreels	21; 14	22; 20
3	(Poland) (Belgium)	Adam Cwalina / Przemysław Wacha; Matijs Dierickx / Freek Golinski	21; 6	21; 16
4	(Poland) (Belgium)	Mateusz Świerczyński; Birger Abts	12; 21	21; 15	21; 13
5	(Poland) (Belgium)	Miłosz Bochat / Łukasz Moreń; Maxime Moreels / Nathan Vervaeke	21; 16	21; 15

=== Norway vs. Spain ===
Norway
0
Kazan Gymnastics Center, Court 7
16 February 2016, 18:00 UTC+3

Spain
5

			1	2	3
1	(Norway) (Spain)	Marius Myhre; Pablo Abián	21; 18	16; 21	14; 21
2	(Norway) (Spain)	Torjus Flåtten; Luís Enrique Peñalver	11; 21	13; 21
3	(Norway) (Spain)	Fredrik Kristensen / Jesper Kristensen; Pablo Abián / Alberto Zapico	17; 21	14; 21
4	(Norway) (Spain)	Peter Rønn Stensæth; Blai Ramírez	8; 21	19; 21
5	(Norway) (Spain)	Magnus Christensen / Vegard Rikheim; Alejo Javier Ibeas / Luís Enrique Peñalver	21; 16	16; 21	14; 21

=== Belgium vs. Spain ===
Belgium
2
Kazan Gymnastics Center, Court 2
17 February 2016, 14:00 UTC+3

Spain
3

			1	2	3
1	(Belgium) (Spain)	Yuhan Tan; Pablo Abián	21; 16	14; 21	21; 15
2	(Belgium) (Spain)	Nathan Vervaeke; Luís Enrique Peñalver	14; 21	17; 21
3	(Belgium) (Spain)	Birger Abts; Blai Ramírez	15; 21	10; 21
4	(Belgium) (Spain)	Matijs Dierickx / Freek Golinski; Pablo Abián / Alberto Zapico	16; 21	21; 16	21; 12
5	(Belgium) (Spain)	Birger Abts / Nathan Vervaeke; Alejo Javier Ibeas / Luís Enrique Peñalver	12; 21	21; 17	12; 21

=== Poland vs. Italy ===
Poland
5
Kazan Gymnastics Center, Court 6
17 February 2016, 14:00 UTC+3

Italy
0

			1	2	3
1	(Poland) (Italy)	Adrian Dziółko; Rosario Maddaloni	21; 20	11; 21	21; 18
2	(Poland) (Italy)	Michał Rogalski; Giovanni Greco	21; 14	14; 21	21; 15
3	(Poland) (Italy)	Łukasz Moreń / Wojciech Szkudlarczyk; Fabio Caponio / Kevin Strobl	21; 6	21; 8
4	(Poland) (Italy)	Mateusz Świerczyński; Matteo Bellucci	21; 8	21; 9
5	(Poland) (Italy)	Adam Cwalina / Przemysław Wacha; Giovanni Greco / Rosario Maddaloni	21; 13	21; 13

=== Italy vs. Spain ===
Italy
1
Kazan Gymnastics Center, Court 6
18 February 2016, 10:00 UTC+3

Spain
4

			1	2	3
1	(Italy) (Spain)	Rosario Maddaloni; Pablo Abián	21; 7	18; 21	17; 21
2	(Italy) (Spain)	Giovanni Greco; Luís Enrique Peñalver	18; 21	14; 21
3	(Italy) (Spain)	Matteo Bellucci; Blai Ramírez	21; 15	12; 21	23; 21
4	(Italy) (Spain)	Giovanni Greco / Rosario Maddaloni; Pablo Abian / Alberto Zapico	21; 23	21; 14	10; 21
5	(Italy) (Spain)	Matteo Bellucci / Kevin Strobl; Alejo Javier Ibeas / Luís Enrique Peñalver	10; 21	11; 21

=== Norway vs. Belgium ===
Norway
0
Kazan Gymnastics Center, Court 7
18 February 2016, 10:00 UTC+3

Belgium
5

			1	2	3
1	(Norway) (Belgium)	Marius Myhre; Yuhan Tan	21; 17	13; 21	17; 21
2	(Norway) (Belgium)	Torjus Flåtten; Nathan Vervaeke	14; 21	11; 21
3	(Norway) (Belgium)	Peter Rønn Stensæth; Birger Abts	12; 21	6; 21
4	(Norway) (Belgium)	Fredrik Kristensen / Jesper Kristensen; Matijs Dierickx / Freek Golinski	3; 21	10; 21
5	(Norway) (Belgium)	Torjus Flåtten / Peter Rønn Stensæth; Birger Abts / Nathan Vervaeke	23; 21	11; 21	14; 21

=== Poland vs. Spain ===
Poland
4
Kazan Gymnastics Center, Court 5
18 February 2016, 18:00 UTC+3

Spain
1

			1	2	3
1	(Poland) (Spain)	Adrian Dziółko; Pablo Abian	17; 21	17; 21
2	(Poland) (Spain)	Michał Rogalski; Luís Enrique Peñalver	21; 7	18; 21	23; 21
3	(Poland) (Spain)	Adam Cwalina / Przemysław Wacha; Pablo Abian / Alberto Zapico	1; 1			retired
4	(Poland) (Spain)	Mateusz Świerczyński; Blai Ramírez	21; 11	21; 8
5	(Poland) (Spain)	Miłosz Bochat / Łukasz Moreń; Alejo Javier Ibeas / Luís Enrique Peñalver	21; 16	21; 12

=== Norway vs. Italy ===
Norway
3
Kazan Gymnastics Center, Court 8
18 February 2016, 18:00 UTC+3

Italy
2

			1	2	3
1	(Norway) (Italy)	Marius Myhre; Giovanni Greco	21; 12	21; 16
2	(Norway) (Italy)	Torjus Flåtten; Matteo Bellucci	21; 10	21; 14
3	(Norway) (Italy)	Fredrik Kristensen / Jesper Kristensen; Giovanni Greco / Rosario Maddaloni	16; 21	21; 19	15; 21
4	(Norway) (Italy)	Peter Rønn Stensæth; Fabio Caponio	20; 22	10; 21
5	(Norway) (Italy)	Magnus Christensen / Vegard Rikheim; Matteo Bellucci / Kevin Strobl	28; 26	21; 10
