= 2016 Badminton Asia Team Championships – Women's team event =

Women's team at the 2016 Badminton Asia Team Championships
- Venue: GMC Balayogi Indoor Stadium
- Location: Hyderabad, India
- Dates: 15–21 February 2016
- Nations: 12

Medalists
gold medal	China
silver medal	Japan
bronze medal	Thailand
bronze medal	South Korea

The women's team event at the 2016 Badminton Asia Team Championships took place from 15 to 21 February at the GMC Balayogi Indoor Stadium in Hyderabad, India.

== Seeds ==
The seeds were announced on 21 January 2016 based on the BWF World Team Rankings.

1. China (final)
2. Japan (champions)
3. South Korea (semi-finals)
4. Thailand (semi-finals)

== Group stage ==
The draw was held on 2 February 2016. The women's team group stages consist of 4 groups: A, B, C and D.

Group A	Group B	Group C	Group D
China (1); Malaysia; Hong Kong	Thailand (4); Chinese Taipei; Sri Lanka	South Korea (3); Indonesia; Maldives	Japan (1); India; Singapore

== Group stage ==
All times are Indian Standard Time (UTC+05:30).

=== Group A ===
Pos	Team	Pld	W	L	MF	MA	MD	GF	GA	GD	PF	PA	PD	Pts	Qualification
1	China	2	2	0	9	1	+8	18	2	+16	407	264	+143	2	Knockout stage
2	Malaysia	2	1	1	4	6	−2	9	13	−4	349	402	−53	1	Knockout stage
3	Hong Kong	2	0	2	2	8	−6	5	17	−12	341	431	−90	0	

Source: TS

==== China vs Hong Kong ====
China
5
GMC Balayogi Indoor Stadium, Court 1
15 February 2016, 16:30

Hong Kong
0

			1	2	3
1	(China) (Hong Kong)	Wang Shixian; Cheung Ngan Yi	21; 18	21; 19
2	(China) (Hong Kong)	Tian Qing / Zhao Yunlei; Ng Wing Yung / Yuen Sin Ying	21; 11	21; 10
3	(China) (Hong Kong)	Sun Yu; Yip Pui Yin	21; 11	21; 18
4	(China) (Hong Kong)	Luo Ying / Luo Yu; Ng Tsz Yau / Yeung Nga Ting	21; 17	21; 13
5	(China) (Hong Kong)	He Bingjiao; Fan Ka Yan	21; 12	21; 7

==== Malaysia vs Hong Kong ====
Malaysia
3
GMC Balayogi Indoor Stadium, Court 4
16 February 2016, 16:30

Hong Kong
2

			1	2	3
1	(Malaysia) (Hong Kong)	Ho Yen Mei; Cheung Ngan Yi	21; 17	17; 21	18; 21
2	(Malaysia) (Hong Kong)	Amelia Alicia Anscelly / Vivian Hoo; Fan Ka Yan / Yuen Sin Ying	21; 18	21; 14
3	(Malaysia) (Hong Kong)	Lim Yin Fun; Yip Pui Yin	14; 21	10; 21
4	(Malaysia) (Hong Kong)	Chow Mei Kuan / Lee Meng Yean; Ng Tsz Yau / Yeung Nga Ting	21; 16	15; 21	21; 16
5	(Malaysia) (Hong Kong)	Goh Jin Wei; Ng Wing Yung	21; 6	21; 13

==== China vs Malaysia ====
China
4
GMC Balayogi Indoor Stadium, Court 4
18 February 2016, 11:30

Malaysia
1

			1	2	3
1	(China) (Malaysia)	Wang Shixian; Ho Yen Mei	21; 19	21; 12
2	(China) (Malaysia)	Luo Ying / Luo Yu; Amelia Alicia Anscelly / Vivian Hoo	21; 14	21; 11
3	(China) (Malaysia)	Sun Yu; Goh Jin Wei	13; 21	16; 21
4	(China) (Malaysia)	Tang Yuanting / Yu Yang; Chow Mei Kuan / Lee Meng Yean	18; 10			retired
5	(China) (Malaysia)	Chen Yufei; Lee Ying Ying	21; 14	21; 6

=== Group B ===
Pos	Team	Pld	W	L	MF	MA	MD	GF	GA	GD	PF	PA	PD	Pts	Qualification
1	Thailand	2	2	0	9	1	+8	18	3	+15	436	270	+166	2	Knockout stage
2	Chinese Taipei	2	1	1	5	5	0	12	10	+2	399	396	+3	1	Knockout stage
3	Sri Lanka	2	0	2	1	9	−8	2	19	−17	259	428	−169	0	

Source: TS

==== Thailand vs Sri Lanka ====
Thailand
5
GMC Balayogi Indoor Stadium, Court 2
15 February 2016, 11:30

Sri Lanka
0

			1	2	3
1	(Thailand) (Sri Lanka)	Busanan Ongbamrungphan; Lekha Shehani	21; 11	21; 9
2	(Thailand) (Sri Lanka)	Porntip Buranaprasertsuk; Thilini Hendahewa	21; 5	21; 7
3	(Thailand) (Sri Lanka)	Pornpawee Chochuwong; Kavidi Sirimannage	21; 8	21; 8
4	(Thailand) (Sri Lanka)	Puttita Supajirakul / Sapsiree Taerattanachai; Achini Ratnasiri / Upuli Weerasinghe	21; 12	21; 11
5	(Thailand) (Sri Lanka)	Chayanit Chaladchalam / Phataimas Muenwong; Kavidi Sirimannage / Oshadie Kuruppu	21; 7	21; 11

==== Chinese Taipei vs Sri Lanka ====
Chinese Taipei
4
GMC Balayogi Indoor Stadium, Court 3
16 February 2016, 11:30

Sri Lanka
1

			1	2	3
1	(Chinese Taipei) (Sri Lanka)	Pai Yu-po; Lekha Shehani	21; 17	21; 17
2	(Chinese Taipei) (Sri Lanka)	Hsu Ya-ching; Achini Ratnasiri	21; 11	21; 17
3	(Chinese Taipei) (Sri Lanka)	Lee Chia-hsin; Thilini Hendahewa	21; 14	19; 21	10; 21
4	(Chinese Taipei) (Sri Lanka)	Hsu Ya-ching / Pai Yu-po; Achini Ratnasiri / Upuli Weerasinghe	21; 12	21; 18
5	(Chinese Taipei) (Sri Lanka)	Hsieh Pei-chen / Wu Ti-jung; Thilini Hendahewa / Kavidi Sirimannage	21; 14	21; 8

==== Thailand vs Chinese Taipei ====
Thailand
4
GMC Balayogi Indoor Stadium, Court 2
18 February 2016, 11:30

Chinese Taipei
1

			1	2	3
1	(Thailand) (Chinese Taipei)	Ratchanok Intanon; Pai Yu-po	21; 12	21; 18
2	(Thailand) (Chinese Taipei)	Busanan Ongbamrungphan; Hsu Ya-ching	21; 13	21; 8
3	(Thailand) (Chinese Taipei)	Porntip Buranaprasertsuk; Lee Chia-hsin	21; 14	20; 22	21; 18
4	(Thailand) (Chinese Taipei)	Jongkolphan Kititharakul / Rawinda Prajongjai; Hsieh Pei-chen / Wu Ti-jung	21; 15	21; 19
5	(Thailand) (Chinese Taipei)	Chayanit Chaladchalam / Phataimas Muenwong; Chen Hsiao-huan / Lee Chia-hsin	19; 21	19; 21

=== Group C ===
Pos	Team	Pld	W	L	MF	MA	MD	GF	GA	GD	PF	PA	PD	Pts	Qualification
1	South Korea	2	2	0	9	1	+8	19	3	+16	453	204	+249	2	Knockout stage
2	Indonesia	2	1	1	6	4	+2	13	9	+4	384	309	+75	1	Knockout stage
3	Maldives	2	0	2	0	10	−10	0	20	−20	96	420	−324	0	

Source: TS

==== South Korea vs Maldives ====
South Korea
5
GMC Balayogi Indoor Stadium, Court 2
16 February 2016, 16:30

Maldives
0

			1	2	3
1	(South Korea) (Maldives)	Bae Yeon-ju; Maisa Fathuhulla Ismail	21; 2	21; 3
2	(South Korea) (Maldives)	Kim Hyo-min; Aishath Afnaan Rasheed	21; 1	21; 7
3	(South Korea) (Maldives)	Go Ah-ra / Yoo Hae-won; Fathimath Nabaaha Abdul Razzaq / Aminath Ahmed Didi	21; 3	21; 4
4	(South Korea) (Maldives)	Lee Jang-mi; Aminath Nabeeha Abdul Razzaq	21; 3	21; 1
5	(South Korea) (Maldives)	Chang Ye-na / Lee So-hee; Aishath Afnaan Rasheed / Moosa Aminath Shahurunaz	21; 4	21; 2

==== Indonesia vs Maldives ====
Indonesia
5
GMC Balayogi Indoor Stadium, Court 3
17 February 2016, 16:30

Maldives
0

			1	2	3
1	(Indonesia) (Maldives)	Maria Febe Kusumastuti; Moosa Aminath Shahurunaz	21; 3	21; 4
2	(Indonesia) (Maldives)	Lindaweni Fanetri; Aishath Afnaan Rasheed	21; 12	21; 6
3	(Indonesia) (Maldives)	Hana Ramadini; Fathimath Nabaaha Abdul Razzaq	21; 11	21; 9
4	(Indonesia) (Maldives)	Anggia Shitta Awanda / Ni Ketut Mahadewi Istarani; Aminath Ahmed Didi / Maisa Fathuhulla Ismail	21; 7	21; 5
5	(Indonesia) (Maldives)	Della Destiara Haris / Rosyita Eka Putri Sari; Aminath Nabeeha Abdul Razzaq / Fathimath Nabaaha Abdul Razzaq	21; 5	21; 4

==== South Korea vs Indonesia ====
South Korea
4
GMC Balayogi Indoor Stadium, Court 1
18 February 2016, 16:30

Indonesia
1

			1	2	3
1	(South Korea) (Indonesia)	Sung Ji-hyun; Maria Febe Kusumastuti	21; 6	19; 21	21; 13
2	(South Korea) (Indonesia)	Jung Kyung-eun / Shin Seung-chan; Greysia Polii / Rosyita Eka Putri Sari	21; 10	21; 17
3	(South Korea) (Indonesia)	Bae Yeon-ju; Lindaweni Fanetri	21; 7	21; 16
4	(South Korea) (Indonesia)	Chang Ye-na / Lee So-hee; Della Destiara Haris / Nitya Krishinda Maheswari	21; 11	21; 17
5	(South Korea) (Indonesia)	Kim Hyo-min; Fitriani	21; 14	16; 21	19; 21

=== Group D ===
Pos	Team	Pld	W	L	MF	MA	MD	GF	GA	GD	PF	PA	PD	Pts	Qualification
1	Japan	2	2	0	10	0	+10	20	4	+16	502	384	+118	2	Knockout stage
2	India	2	1	1	5	5	0	13	10	+3	422	404	+18	1	Knockout stage
3	Singapore	2	0	2	0	10	−10	1	20	−19	304	440	−136	0	

Source: TS

==== Japan vs Singapore ====
Japan
5
GMC Balayogi Indoor Stadium, Court 1
16 February 2016, 11:30

Singapore
0

			1	2	3
1	(Japan) (Singapore)	Sayaka Sato; Liang Xiaoyu	21; 17	21; 17
2	(Japan) (Singapore)	Misaki Matsutomo / Ayaka Takahashi; Vanessa Neo / Crystal Wong Jia Ying	21; 10	21; 17
3	(Japan) (Singapore)	Yui Hashimoto; Grace Chua Hui Zhen	21; 15	21; 9
4	(Japan) (Singapore)	Naoko Fukuman / Kurumi Yonao; Shinta Mulia Sari / Tan Wei Han	21; 12	21; 15
5	(Japan) (Singapore)	Minatsu Mitani; Yeo Jia Min	19; 21	22; 20	21; 19

==== India vs Singapore ====
India
5
GMC Balayogi Indoor Stadium, Court 1
17 February 2016, 16:30

Singapore
0

			1	2	3
1	(India) (Singapore)	P. V. Sindhu; Liang Xiaoyu	21; 17	21; 11
2	(India) (Singapore)	P. C. Thulasi; Grace Chua	21; 16	21; 7
3	(India) (Singapore)	Ruthvika Gadde; Yeo Jia Min	21; 14	21; 11
4	(India) (Singapore)	Jwala Gutta / Ashwini Ponnappa; Shinta Mulia Sari / Tan Wei Han	21; 18	21; 16
5	(India) (Singapore)	N. Sikki Reddy / P. V. Sindhu; Crystal Wong / Yeo Jia Min	21; 8	21; 14

==== Japan vs India ====
Japan
5
GMC Balayogi Indoor Stadium, Court 2
18 February 2016, 16:30

India
0

			1	2	3
1	(Japan) (India)	Nozomi Okuhara; P. V. Sindhu	18; 21	21; 12	21; 12
2	(Japan) (India)	Sayaka Sato; P. C. Thulasi	24; 22	21; 14
3	(Japan) (India)	Yui Hashimoto; Ruthvika Gadde	23; 25	21; 14	21; 14
4	(Japan) (India)	Misaki Matsutomo / Ayaka Takahashi; Jwala Gutta / Ashwini Ponnappa	21; 12	21; 18
5	(Japan) (India)	Shizuka Matsuo / Mami Naito; N. Sikki Reddy / P. V. Sindhu	18; 21	21; 11	21; 16

== Knockout stage ==
=== Bracket ===
Quarter-finals
19 February
China (1)	3
Indonesia	0
19 February
South Korea (3)	3
India	0
19 February
Malaysia	0
Thailand (4)	3
19 February
Chinese Taipei	1
Japan (2)	3

Semi-finals
20 February
China (1)	3
South Korea (3)	0
20 February
Thailand (4)	0
Japan (2)	3

Final
21 February
China (1)	3
Japan (2)	2

=== Quarter-finals ===
==== China vs Indonesia ====
China
3
GMC Balayogi Indoor Stadium, Court 3
19 February 2016, 16:30
Report

Indonesia
0

			1	2	3
1	(China) (Indonesia)	Wang Shixian; Maria Febe Kusumastuti	21; 14	21; 9
2	(China) (Indonesia)	Tang Yuanting / Yu Yang; Nitya Krishinda Maheswari / Greysia Polii	22; 20	17; 21	21; 10
3	(China) (Indonesia)	Sun Yu; Hanna Ramadini	21; 11	21; 10
4	(China) (Indonesia)	Luo Ying / Tian Qing; Anggia Shitta Awanda / Ni Ketut Mahadewi Istirani				not played
5	(China) (Indonesia)	He Bingjiao; Fitriani				not played

==== South Korea vs India ====
South Korea
3
GMC Balayogi Indoor Stadium, Court 1
19 February 2016, 16:30
Report

India
0

			1	2	3
1	(South Korea) (India)	Sung Ji-hyun; P. V. Sindhu	21; 13	21; 14
2	(South Korea) (India)	Jung Kyung-eun / Shin Seung-chan; Jwala Gutta / Ashwini Ponnappa	21; 15	20; 20	21; 13
3	(South Korea) (India)	Bae Yeon-ju; P. C. Thulasi	21; 14	21; 15
4	(South Korea) (India)	Chang Ye-na / Lee So-hee; N. Sikki Reddy / P. V. Sindhu				not played
5	(South Korea) (India)	Kim Hyo-min; Ruthvika Gadde				not played

==== Malaysia vs Thailand ====
Malaysia
0
GMC Balayogi Indoor Stadium, Court 2
19 February 2016, 11:30
Report

Thailand
3

			1	2	3
1	(Malaysia) (Thailand)	Ho Yen Mei; Ratchanok Intanon	6; 21	9; 21
2	(Malaysia) (Thailand)	Vivian Hoo / Woon Khe Wei; Puttita Supajirakul / Sapsiree Taerattanachai	18; 21	17; 21
3	(Malaysia) (Thailand)	Lim Yin Fun; Busanan Ongbamrungphan	7; 21	12; 21
4	(Malaysia) (Thailand)	Amelia Alicia Anscelly / Lee Meng Yean; Jongkongphan Kittiharakul / Rawinda Prajongjai				not played
5	(Malaysia) (Thailand)	Goh Jin Wei; Porntip Buranaprasertsuk				not played

==== Chinese Taipei vs Japan ====
Chinese Taipei
1
GMC Balayogi Indoor Stadium, Court 4
19 February 2016, 11:30
Report

Japan
3

			1	2	3
1	(Chinese Taipei) (Japan)	Pai Yu-po; Nozomi Okuhara	9; 21	12; 21
2	(Chinese Taipei) (Japan)	Hsu Ya-ching; Sayaka Sato	9; 21	18; 21
3	(Chinese Taipei) (Japan)	Lee Chia-hsin; Minatsu Mitani	15; 21	21; 18	21; 17
4	(Chinese Taipei) (Japan)	Hsu Ya-ching / Pai Yu-po; Misaki Matsutomo / Ayaka Takahashi	10; 21	6; 21
5	(Chinese Taipei) (Japan)	Chen Hsiao-huan / Lee Chia-hsin; Naoko Fukuman / Kurumi Yonao				not played

=== Semi-finals ===
==== China vs South Korea ====
China
3
GMC Balayogi Indoor Stadium, Court 2
20 February 2016, 11:30
Report

South Korea
0

			1	2	3
1	(China) (South Korea)	Wang Shixian; Sung Ji-hyun	21; 13	21; 12
2	(China) (South Korea)	Luo Ying / Tian Qing; Jung Kyung-eun / Shin Seung-chan	21; 7	16; 21	21; 14
3	(China) (South Korea)	Sun Yu; Bae Yeon-ju	21; 18	21; 13
4	(China) (South Korea)	Luo Yu / Tang Yuanting; Chang Ye-na / Lee So-hee				not played
5	(China) (South Korea)	He Bingjiao; Kim Hyo-min				not played

==== Thailand vs Japan ====
Thailand
0
GMC Balayogi Indoor Stadium, Court 1
20 February 2016, 11:30
Report

Japan
3

			1	2	3
1	(Thailand) (Japan)	Busanan Ongbamrungphan; Nozomi Okuhara	14; 21	21; 17	14; 21
2	(Thailand) (Japan)	Puttita Supajirakul / Sapsiree Taerattanachai; Misaki Matsutomo / Ayaka Takahashi	21; 16	13; 21	18; 21
3	(Thailand) (Japan)	Porntip Buranaprasertsuk; Sayaka Sato	19; 21	16; 21
4	(Thailand) (Japan)	Jongkongphan Kittiharakul / Rawinda Prajongjai; Naoko Fukuman / Kurumi Yonao				not played
5	(Thailand) (Japan)	Pornpawee Chochuwong; Yui Hashimoto				not played

=== Final ===
==== China vs Japan ====
China
3
GMC Balayogi Indoor Stadium, Court 1
21 February 2016, 11:30
Report

Japan
2

			1	2	3
1	(China) (Japan)	Wang Shixian; Nozomi Okuhara	21; 17	16; 21	15; 21
2	(China) (Japan)	Luo Ying / Tian Qing; Misaki Matsutomo / Ayaka Takahashi	12; 21	16; 21
3	(China) (Japan)	Sun Yu; Sayaka Sato	22; 20	21; 19
4	(China) (Japan)	Luo Yu / Tang Yuanting; Naoko Fukuman / Kurumi Yonao	21; 11	21; 10
5	(China) (Japan)	He Bingjiao; Yui Hashimoto	21; 18	21; 12

== Final ranking ==
Pos	Team	Pld	W	L	Pts	MD	GD	PD	Final result
1st place, gold medalist(s)	China	5	5	0	5	+15	+28	+228	Champions
2nd place, silver medalist(s)	Japan	5	4	1	4	+14	+22	+186	Runners-up
3rd place, bronze medalist(s)	Thailand	4	3	1	3	+8	+17	+200	Eliminated in semi-finals
3rd place, bronze medalist(s)	South Korea	4	3	1	3	+8	+16	+245	Eliminated in semi-finals
5	Indonesia	3	1	2	1	−1	−1	+26	Eliminated in quarter-finals
6	Chinese Taipei	3	1	2	1	−2	−3	−58	Eliminated in quarter-finals
7	India	3	1	2	1	−3	−2	−22	Eliminated in quarter-finals
8	Malaysia	3	1	2	1	−5	−9	−86	Eliminated in quarter-finals
9	Hong Kong	2	0	2	0	−6	−12	−90	Eliminated in group stage
10	Singapore	2	0	2	0	−10	−19	−136	Eliminated in group stage
11	Sri Lanka	2	0	2	0	−6	−11	−82	Eliminated in group stage
12	Maldives	2	0	2	0	−10	−20	−324	Eliminated in group stage
