= 2016 European Men's Team Badminton Championships knockout stage =

This article lists the full results for knockout stage of 2016 European Men's Team Badminton Championships.

== Bracket ==
Quarter-finals
19 February 2016
Denmark	3
Russia	1
Germany	3
Sweden	0
Ukraine	0
France	3
Poland	0
England	3

Semi-finals
20 February 2016
Denmark	3
Germany	0
France	3
England	2

Final
21 February 2016
Denmark	3
France	1

== Quarter-finals ==
=== Denmark vs. Russia ===
Denmark
3
Kazan Gymnastics Center, Court 1
19 February 2016, 10:00 UTC+3

Russia
1

			1	2	3
1	(Denmark) (Russia)	Jan Ø. Jørgensen; Vladimir Malkov	21; 12	21; 6
2	(Denmark) (Russia)	Mads Conrad-Petersen / Mads Pieler Kolding; Vladimir Ivanov / Ivan Sozonov	17; 21	11; 21
3	(Denmark) (Russia)	Viktor Axelsen; Sergey Sirant	21; 16	21; 8
4	(Denmark) (Russia)	Kim Astrup / Anders Skaarup Rasmussen; Evgenij Dremin / Vasily Kuznetsov	21; 16	21; 18
5	(Denmark) (Russia)	Emil Holst; Denis Grachev				not played

=== Germany vs. Sweden ===
Germany
3
Kazan Gymnastics Center, Court 1
19 February 2016, 13:00 UTC+3

Sweden
0

			1	2	3
1	(Germany) (Sweden)	Marc Zwiebler; Henri Hurskainen	21; 15	21; 13
2	(Germany) (Sweden)	Michael Fuchs / Josche Zurwonne; Richard Eidestedt / Nico Ruponen	21; 14	22; 20
3	(Germany) (Sweden)	Dieter Domke; Mattias Borg	21; 6	11; 21	21; 14
4	(Germany) (Sweden)	Mark Lamsfuß / Marvin Seidel; Filip Michael Duwall Myhren / Jonatan Nordh				not played
5	(Germany) (Sweden)	Lars Schänzler; Jacob Nilsson				not played

=== Ukraine vs. France ===
Ukraine
0
Kazan Gymnastics Center, Court 3
19 February 2016, 13:30 UTC+3

France
3

			1	2	3
1	(Ukraine) (France)	Dmytro Zavadsky; Brice Leverdez	13; 21	7; 21
2	(Ukraine) (France)	Artem Pochtarov; Lucas Corvée	17; 21	14; 21
3	(Ukraine) (France)	Valeriy Atrashchenkov; Lucas Claerbout	19; 21	12; 21
4	(Ukraine) (France)	Gennadiy Natarov / Artem Pochtarov; Bastian Kersaudy / Gaëtan Mittelheisser				not played
5	(Ukraine) (France)	Valeriy Atrashchenkov / Dmytro Zavadsky; Ronan Labar / Julien Maio				not played

=== Poland vs. England ===
Poland
0
Kazan Gymnastics Center, Court 2
19 February 2016, 11:00 UTC+3

England
3

			1	2	3
1	(Poland) (England)	Adrian Dziółko; Rajiv Ouseph	6; 21	11; 21
2	(Poland) (England)	Adam Cwalina / Przemysław Wacha; Marcus Ellis / Chris Langridge	15; 21	16; 21
3	(Poland) (England)	Michał Rogalski; Toby Penty	17; 21	17; 21
4	(Poland) (England)	Miłosz Bochat / Łukasz Moreń; Peter Briggs / Tom Wolfenden				not played
5	(Poland) (England)	Mateusz Świerczyński; Sam Parsons				not played

== Semi-finals ==
=== Denmark vs. Germany ===
Denmark
3
Kazan Gymnastics Center, Court 1
20 February 2016, 12:00 UTC+3

Germany
0

			1	2	3
1	(Denmark) (Germany)	Jan Ø. Jørgensen; Marc Zwiebler	21; 17	21; 19
2	(Denmark) (Germany)	Mads Conrad-Petersen / Mads Pieler Kolding; Michael Fuchs / Johannes Schöttler	21; 14	21; 23	21; 16
3	(Denmark) (Germany)	Viktor Axelsen; Dieter Domke	21; 11	21; 17
4	(Denmark) (Germany)	Kim Astrup / Anders Skaarup Rasmussen; Raphael Beck / Peter Käsbauer				not played
5	(Denmark) (Germany)	Hans-Kristian Vittinghus; Kai Schäfer				not played

=== France vs. England ===
France
3
Kazan Gymnastics Center, Court 2
20 February 2016, 14:00 UTC+3

England
2

			1	2	3
1	(France) (England)	Brice Leverdez; Rajiv Ouseph	10; 21	22; 20	21; 8
2	(France) (England)	Bastian Kersaudy / Gaëtan Mittelheisser; Marcus Ellis / Chris Langridge	9; 21	11; 21
3	(France) (England)	Lucas Corvée; Toby Penty	9; 21	21; 14	16; 21
4	(France) (England)	Ronan Labar / Julien Maio; Peter Mills / Tom Wolfenden	21; 19	21; 17
5	(France) (England)	Lucas Claerbout; Sam Parsons	21; 12	25; 23

== Final ==
=== Denmark vs. France ===
Denmark
3
Kazan Gymnastics Center, Court 1
21 February 2016, 12:00 UTC+3

France
1

			1	2	3
1	(Denmark) (France)	Jan Ø. Jørgensen; Brice Leverdez	21; 19	16; 21	16; 21
2	(Denmark) (France)	Mads Conrad-Petersen / Mads Pieler Kolding; Bastian Kersaudy / Gaëtan Mittelheisser	17; 21	21; 11	21; 8
3	(Denmark) (France)	Viktor Axelsen; Thomas Rouxel	21; 13	21; 12
4	(Denmark) (France)	Kim Astrup / Anders Skaarup Rasmussen; Ronan Labar / Julien Maio	21; 10	21; 5
5	(Denmark) (France)	Hans-Kristian Vittinghus; Lucas Claerbout				not played
