= 2016 European Women's Team Badminton Championships knockout stage =

This article lists the full results for knockout stage of 2016 European Women's Team Badminton Championships.

== Bracket ==
Quarter-finals
19 February 2016
Denmark	3
Finland	0
Germany	3
Russia	0
Spain	3
Ukraine	0
Turkey	1
Bulgaria	3

Semi-finals
20 February 2016
Denmark	3
Germany	1
Spain	2
Bulgaria	3

Final
21 February 2016
Denmark	3
Bulgaria	1

== Quarter-finals ==
=== Denmark vs. Finland ===
Denmark
3
Kazan Gymnastics Center, Court 2
19 February 2016, 13:00 UTC+3

Finland
0

			1	2	3
1	(Denmark) (Finland)	Line Kjærsfeldt; Nanna Vainio	19; 21	21; 7	21; 8
2	(Denmark) (Finland)	Anna Thea Madsen; Airi Mikkelä	21; 19	21; 7
3	(Denmark) (Finland)	Mette Poulsen; Sonja Pekkola	21; 11	21; 16
4	(Denmark) (Finland)	Maiken Fruergaard / Sara Thygesen; Mathilda Lindholm / Airi Mikkelä				not played
5	(Denmark) (Finland)	Kamilla Rytter Juhl / Christinna Pedersen; Jenny Nyström / Sonja Pekkola				not played

=== Germany vs. Russia ===
Germany
3
Kazan Gymnastics Center, Court 1
19 February 2016, 16:00 UTC+3

Russia
0

			1	2	3
1	(Germany) (Russia)	Karin Schnaase; Ksenia Polikarpova	21; 16	21; 17
2	(Germany) (Russia)	Isabel Herttrich / Carla Nelte; Ekaterina Bolotova / Evgeniya Kosetskaya	21; 9	18; 21	21; 15
3	(Germany) (Russia)	Fabienne Deprez; Natalia Perminova	21; 14	21; 12
4	(Germany) (Russia)	Linda Efler / Lara Käpplein; Anastasiia Akchurina / Olga Morozova				not played
5	(Germany) (Russia)	Luise Heim; Elena Komendrovskaja				not played

=== Spain vs. Ukraine ===
Spain
3
Kazan Gymnastics Center, Court 2
19 February 2016, 15:00 UTC+3

Ukraine
0

			1	2	3
1	(Spain) (Ukraine)	Carolina Marín; Marija Ulitina	21; 18	21; 15
2	(Spain) (Ukraine)	Beatriz Corrales; Natalya Voytsekh	23; 21	21; 18
3	(Spain) (Ukraine)	Clara Azurmendi; Elena Prus	21; 16	21; 9
4	(Spain) (Ukraine)	Haidee Ojeda / Sara Peñalver; Natalya Voytsekh / Yelyzaveta Zharka				not played
5	(Spain) (Ukraine)	Beatriz Corrales / Carolina Marín; Yuliya Kazarinova / Elena Prus				not played

=== Turkey vs. Bulgaria ===
Turkey
1
Kazan Gymnastics Center, Court 3
19 February 2016, 15:30 UTC+3

Bulgaria
3

			1	2	3
1	(Turkey) (Bulgaria)	Neslihan Yiğit; Linda Zetchiri	21; 16	21; 14
2	(Turkey) (Bulgaria)	Özge Bayrak; Petya Nedelcheva	18; 21	21; 13	15; 21
3	(Turkey) (Bulgaria)	Cemre Fere; Stefani Stoeva	7; 21	13; 21
4	(Turkey) (Bulgaria)	Özge Bayrak / Neslihan Yiğit; Gabriela Stoeva / Stefani Stoeva	9; 21	13; 21
5	(Turkey) (Bulgaria)	Cemre Fere / Ebru Yazgan; Mariya Mitsova / Petya Nedelcheva				not played

== Semi-finals ==
=== Denmark vs. Germany ===
Denmark
3
Kazan Gymnastics Center, Court 1
20 February 2016, 16:00 UTC+3

Germany
1

			1	2	3
1	(Denmark) (Germany)	Line Kjærsfeldt; Karin Schnaase	20; 22	14; 21
2	(Denmark) (Germany)	Anna Thea Madsen; Fabienne Deprez	23; 21	21; 15
3	(Denmark) (Germany)	Mette Poulsen; Luise Heim	21; 16	21; 8
4	(Denmark) (Germany)	Christinna Pedersen / Kamilla Rytter Juhl; Johanna Goliszewski / Carla Nelte	21; 13	5; 1		retired
5	(Denmark) (Germany)	Maiken Fruergaard / Sara Thygesen; Luise Heim / Isabel Herttrich				not played

=== Spain vs. Bulgaria ===
Spain
2
Kazan Gymnastics Center, Court 3
20 February 2016, 14:00 UTC+3

Bulgaria
3

			1	2	3
1	(Spain) (Bulgaria)	Carolina Marín; Linda Zetchiri	21; 17	21; 9
2	(Spain) (Bulgaria)	Beatriz Corrales; Petya Nedelcheva	21; 13	21; 11
3	(Spain) (Bulgaria)	Clara Azurmendi; Stefani Stoeva	17; 21	11; 21
4	(Spain) (Bulgaria)	Haideé Ojeda / Sara Peñalver; Petya Nedelcheva / Gabriela Stoeva	19; 21	11; 21
5	(Spain) (Bulgaria)	Beatriz Corrales / Carolina Marín; Stefani Stoeva / Linda Zetchiri	10; 21	21; 17	20; 22

== Final ==
=== Denmark vs. Bulgaria ===
Denmark
3
Kazan Gymnastics Center, Court 1
21 February 2016, 16:00 UTC+3

Bulgaria
1

			1	2	3
1	(Denmark) (Bulgaria)	Line Kjærsfeldt; Linda Zetchiri	21; 15	21; 9
2	(Denmark) (Bulgaria)	Anna Thea Madsen; Petya Nedelcheva	21; 18	21; 18
3	(Denmark) (Bulgaria)	Mette Poulsen; Stefani Stoeva	13; 21	15; 21
4	(Denmark) (Bulgaria)	Kamilla Rytter Juhl / Christinna Pedersen; Petya Nedelcheva / Gabriela Stoeva	21; 11	21; 12
5	(Denmark) (Bulgaria)	Maiken Fruergaard / Sara Thygesen; Stefani Stoeva / Linda Zetchiri				not played
