= 2016 European Men's and Women's Team Badminton Championships =

Tournament details
- Dates: 16–21 February 2016
- Edition: 6
- Venue: Gymnastics Center Kazan
- Location: Kazan, Russia

The 2016 European Men's and Women's Team Badminton Championships was held in Kazan, Russia, from February 16 to February 21, 2016. This tournament also serves as European qualification for the 2016 Thomas & Uber Cup.

== Medalists ==
Event	Gold	Silver	Bronze
Men's Team	Denmark	France	Germany England
Women's Team	Denmark	Bulgaria	Germany Spain

== Men's team ==
=== Group stage ===
==== Group 1 ====
Pos	Team	Pld	W	L	MF	MA	MD	GF	GA	GD	PF	PA	PD	Pts	Qualification	Denmark	Croatia	Finland	Turkey
1	Denmark	3	3	0	15	0	+15	29	1	+28	607	366	+241	3	Knockout stage	—	5–0	5–0	5–0
2	Croatia	3	2	1	6	9	−3	15	19	−4	565	608	−43	2			—	3–2	3–2
3	Finland	3	1	2	7	8	−1	16	16	0	531	529	+2	1				—	5–0
4	Turkey	3	0	3	2	13	−11	4	28	−24	454	654	−200	0					—

Source: TS

==== Group 2 ====
Pos	Team	Pld	W	L	MF	MA	MD	GF	GA	GD	PF	PA	PD	Pts	Qualification	England	Bulgaria	Estonia	Hungary
1	England	3	3	0	14	1	+13	29	2	+27	654	362	+292	3	Knockout stage	—	4–1	5–0	5–0
2	Bulgaria	3	2	1	7	8	−1	16	20	−4	641	673	−32	2			—	3–2	3–2
3	Estonia	3	1	2	5	10	−5	13	22	−9	573	700	−127	1				—	3–2
4	Hungary	3	0	3	4	11	−7	11	25	−14	562	695	−133	0					—

Source: TS

==== Group 3 ====
Pos	Team	Pld	W	L	MF	MA	MD	GF	GA	GD	PF	PA	PD	Pts	Qualification	Germany	Czech Republic	Ireland	Lithuania
1	Germany	3	3	0	14	1	+13	29	4	+25	671	434	+237	3	Knockout stage	—	4–1	5–0	5–0
2	Czech Republic	3	2	1	9	6	+3	19	15	+4	619	570	+49	2			—	3–2	5–0
3	Ireland	3	1	2	6	9	−3	12	18	−6	490	530	−40	1				—	4–1
4	Lithuania	3	0	3	1	14	−13	5	28	−23	421	667	−246	0					—

Source: TS

==== Group 4 ====
Pos	Team	Pld	W	L	MF	MA	MD	GF	GA	GD	PF	PA	PD	Pts	Qualification	France	Sweden	Scotland	Slovakia
1	France	3	3	0	12	3	+9	26	7	+19	671	471	+200	3	Knockout stage	—	3–2	4–1	5–0
2	Sweden	3	2	1	11	4	+7	22	10	+12	607	490	+117	2	Knockout stage		—	4–1	5–0
3	Scotland	3	1	2	7	8	−1	16	18	−2	584	622	−38	1				—	5–0
4	Slovakia	3	0	3	0	15	−15	1	30	−29	368	647	−279	0					—

Source: TS

==== Group 5 ====
Pos	Team	Pld	W	L	MF	MA	MD	GF	GA	GD	PF	PA	PD	Pts	Qualification	Russia	Ukraine	Austria	Slovenia
1	Russia	3	3	0	11	4	+7	23	10	+13	638	494	+144	3	Knockout stage	—	3–2	4–1	4–1
2	Ukraine	3	2	1	11	4	+7	22	12	+10	628	586	+42	2	Knockout stage		—	4–1	5–0
3	Austria	3	1	2	5	10	−5	14	20	−6	591	650	−59	1				—	3–2
4	Slovenia	3	0	3	3	12	−9	9	26	−17	572	699	−127	0					—

Source: TS

==== Group 6 ====
Pos	Team	Pld	W	L	MF	MA	MD	GF	GA	GD	PF	PA	PD	Pts	Qualification	Poland	Spain	Belgium	Norway	Italy
1	Poland	4	4	0	19	1	+18	36	6	+30	852	621	+231	4	Knockout stage	—	4–0	5–0	5–0	5–0
2	Spain	4	3	1	13	7	+6	30	17	+13	875	797	+78	3			—	3–2	5–0	4–1
3	Belgium	4	2	2	12	8	+4	26	20	+6	840	766	+74	2				—	5–0	5–0
4	Norway	4	1	3	3	17	−14	11	34	−23	703	896	−193	1					—	3–2
5	Italy	4	0	4	3	17	−14	10	36	−26	719	909	−190	0						—

Source: TS

=== Ranking of second-placed teams ===
Pos	Grp	Team	Pld	W	L	MF	MA	MD	GF	GA	GD	PF	PA	PD	Pts	Qualification
1	4	Sweden	3	2	1	11	4	+7	22	10	+12	607	490	+117	2	Knockout stage
2	5	Ukraine	3	2	1	11	4	+7	22	12	+10	628	586	+42	2	Knockout stage
3	6	Spain	3	2	1	9	6	+3	21	13	+8	627	580	+47	2	
4	3	Czech Republic	3	2	1	9	6	+3	19	15	+4	619	570	+49	2	
5	2	Bulgaria	3	2	1	7	8	−1	16	20	−4	641	673	−32	2	
6	1	Croatia	3	2	1	6	9	−3	15	19	−4	565	608	−43	2	

Source: BWF
Rules for classification: Due to group 6 having different number of teams, the results against the fifth-placed teams are not considered for this ranking.

=== Knockout stage ===
Quarter-finals
19 February 2016
Denmark	3
Russia	1
Germany	3
Sweden	0
Ukraine	0
France	3
Poland	0
England	3

Semi-finals
20 February 2016
Denmark	3
Germany	0
France	3
England	2

Final
21 February 2016
Denmark	3
France	1

== Women's team ==
=== Group stage ===
==== Group 1 ====
Pos	Team	Pld	W	L	MF	MA	MD	GF	GA	GD	PF	PA	PD	Pts	Qualification	Denmark	Finland	Lithuania	Belarus
1	Denmark	3	3	0	14	1	+13	29	2	+27	645	308	+337	3	Knockout stage	—	4–1	5–0	5–0
2	Finland	3	2	1	9	6	+3	19	15	+4	596	590	+6	2	Knockout stage		—	4–1	4–1
3	Lithuania	3	1	2	5	10	−5	11	22	−11	477	615	−138	1				—	4–1
4	Belarus	3	0	3	2	13	−11	7	27	−20	466	671	−205	0					—

Source: TS

==== Group 2 ====
Pos	Team	Pld	W	L	MF	MA	MD	GF	GA	GD	PF	PA	PD	Pts	Qualification	Bulgaria	Spain	Estonia	Belgium
1	Bulgaria	3	3	0	13	2	+11	27	9	+18	712	523	+189	3	Knockout stage	—	3–2	5–0	5–0
2	Spain	3	2	1	10	5	+5	21	14	+7	673	591	+82	2	Knockout stage		—	3–2	5–0
3	Estonia	3	1	2	7	8	−1	18	16	+2	620	636	−16	1				—	5–0
4	Belgium	3	0	3	0	15	−15	3	30	−27	420	675	−255	0					—

Source: TS

==== Group 3 ====
Pos	Team	Pld	W	L	MF	MA	MD	GF	GA	GD	PF	PA	PD	Pts	Qualification	Germany	England	France	Wales
1	Germany	2	2	0	8	2	+6	17	7	+10	472	388	+84	2	Knockout stage	—	4–1	4–1	—
2	England	2	1	1	4	6	−2	11	13	−2	430	456	−26	1			—	3–2	—
3	France	2	0	2	3	7	−4	7	15	−8	399	457	−58	0				—	—
4	Wales	0	0	0	0	0	0	0	0	0	0	0	0	0	Withdrew				—

Source: TS

==== Group 4 ====
Pos	Team	Pld	W	L	MF	MA	MD	GF	GA	GD	PF	PA	PD	Pts	Qualification	Ukraine	Turkey	Czech Republic	Italy
1	Ukraine	3	3	0	12	3	+9	26	7	+19	646	507	+139	3	Knockout stage	—	3–2	4–1	5–0
2	Turkey	3	2	1	10	5	+5	22	14	+8	698	571	+127	2	Knockout stage		—	4–1	4–1
3	Czech Republic	3	1	2	7	8	−1	16	16	0	562	565	−3	1				—	5–0
4	Italy	3	0	3	1	14	−13	2	29	−27	385	648	−263	0					—

Source: TS

==== Group 5 ====
Pos	Team	Pld	W	L	MF	MA	MD	GF	GA	GD	PF	PA	PD	Pts	Qualification	Russia	Hungary	Ireland	Slovakia
1	Russia	3	3	0	15	0	+15	30	4	+26	697	372	+325	3	Knockout stage	—	5–0	5–0	5–0
2	Hungary	3	2	1	7	8	−1	16	19	−3	564	654	−90	2			—	3–2	4–1
3	Ireland	3	1	2	6	9	−3	15	19	−4	576	624	−48	1				—	4–1
4	Slovakia	3	0	3	2	13	−11	8	27	−19	511	698	−187	0					—

Source: TS

=== Ranking of second-placed teams ===
Pos	Grp	Team	Pld	W	L	MF	MA	MD	GF	GA	GD	PF	PA	PD	Pts	Qualification
1	4	Turkey	3	2	1	10	5	+5	22	14	+8	698	571	+127	2	Knockout stage
2	2	Spain	3	2	1	10	5	+5	21	14	+7	673	591	+82	2	Knockout stage
3	1	Finland	3	2	1	9	6	+3	19	15	+4	596	590	+6	2	Knockout stage
4	5	Hungary	3	2	1	7	8	−1	16	19	−3	564	654	−90	2	
5	3	England	3	2	1	4	6	−2	11	13	−2	430	456	−26	2	

Source: BWF

=== Knockout stage ===
Quarter-finals
19 February 2016
Denmark	3
Finland	0
Germany	3
Russia	0
Spain	3
Ukraine	0
Turkey	1
Bulgaria	3

Semi-finals
20 February 2016
Denmark	3
Germany	1
Spain	2
Bulgaria	3

Final
21 February 2016
Denmark	3
Bulgaria	1
