= 2020 BWF season =

Badminton World Federation circuit

Details
- Duration: 7 January 2020 – 31 January 2021
- Tournaments: 32
- Categories: Grade 2 – BWF World Tour Finals: 1; Grade 2 – Super 1000: 3; Grade 2 – Super 750: 1; Grade 2 – Super 500: 2; Grade 2 – Super 300: 2; Grade 2 – Super 100: 1; Grade 3 – International Challenge: 2; Grade 3 – International Series: 7; Grade 3 – Future Series: 6; Continental Championships: 7

Achievements (singles)

Awards
- Player of the year: (Denmark) Viktor Axelsen (male, 2020–2021) (Chinese Taipei) Tai Tzu-ying (female, 2020–2021) (Indonesia) Greysia Polii (pair, 2020–2021) (Indonesia) Apriyani Rahayu (pair, 2020–2021)

The 2020 BWF season was the overall badminton circuit organized by the Badminton World Federation (BWF) for the 2020 badminton season to publish and promote the sport. The world badminton tournament in 2020 consisted of:
1. BWF World Tour (Grade 2)

- Level 1 (BWF World Tour Finals)
- Level 2 (BWF World Tour Super 1000)
- Level 3 (BWF World Tour Super 750)
- Level 4 (BWF World Tour Super 500)
- Level 5 (BWF World Tour Super 300)
- Level 6 (BWF Tour Super 100)

2. Continental Circuit (Grade 3) BWF Open Tournaments: BWF International Challenge, BWF International Series, and BWF Future Series.

The tournaments – Super 1000, Super 750, Super 500, Super 300, Super 100, International Challenge, International Series, and Future Series were all individual tournaments. The higher the level of tournament, the larger the prize money and the more ranking points available.

The 2020 BWF season calendar comprised these six levels of BWF tournaments.

== Schedule ==
This is the complete schedule of events on the 2020 calendar, with the champions and runners-up documented.

Key

Olympic
World Tour Finals
Super 1000
Super 750
Super 500
Super 300
Super 100
International Challenge
International Series
Future Series
Continental events

=== January ===
Week commencing	Tournament	Champions	Runners-up
6 January	Malaysia Masters (Draw): Host: Kuala Lumpur, Malaysia; Venue: Axiata Arena; Level: Super 500; Prize: $400,000; Format: 32MS/32WS/32MD/32WD/32XD	(Japan) Kento Momota	(Denmark) Viktor Axelsen
6 January	Malaysia Masters (Draw): Host: Kuala Lumpur, Malaysia; Venue: Axiata Arena; Level: Super 500; Prize: $400,000; Format: 32MS/32WS/32MD/32WD/32XD	Score: 24–22, 21–11	
6 January	Malaysia Masters (Draw): Host: Kuala Lumpur, Malaysia; Venue: Axiata Arena; Level: Super 500; Prize: $400,000; Format: 32MS/32WS/32MD/32WD/32XD	(China) Chen Yufei	(Chinese Taipei) Tai Tzu-ying
6 January	Malaysia Masters (Draw): Host: Kuala Lumpur, Malaysia; Venue: Axiata Arena; Level: Super 500; Prize: $400,000; Format: 32MS/32WS/32MD/32WD/32XD	Score: 21–17, 21–10	
6 January	Malaysia Masters (Draw): Host: Kuala Lumpur, Malaysia; Venue: Axiata Arena; Level: Super 500; Prize: $400,000; Format: 32MS/32WS/32MD/32WD/32XD	(South Korea) Kim Gi-jung (South Korea) Lee Yong-dae	(China) Li Junhui (China) Liu Yuchen
6 January	Malaysia Masters (Draw): Host: Kuala Lumpur, Malaysia; Venue: Axiata Arena; Level: Super 500; Prize: $400,000; Format: 32MS/32WS/32MD/32WD/32XD	Score: 21–14, 21–16	
6 January	Malaysia Masters (Draw): Host: Kuala Lumpur, Malaysia; Venue: Axiata Arena; Level: Super 500; Prize: $400,000; Format: 32MS/32WS/32MD/32WD/32XD	(China) Li Wenmei (China) Zheng Yu	(China) Du Yue (China) Li Yinhui
6 January	Malaysia Masters (Draw): Host: Kuala Lumpur, Malaysia; Venue: Axiata Arena; Level: Super 500; Prize: $400,000; Format: 32MS/32WS/32MD/32WD/32XD	Score: 21–19, 16–21, 21–19	
6 January	Malaysia Masters (Draw): Host: Kuala Lumpur, Malaysia; Venue: Axiata Arena; Level: Super 500; Prize: $400,000; Format: 32MS/32WS/32MD/32WD/32XD	(China) Zheng Siwei (China) Huang Yaqiong	(China) Wang Yilyu (China) Huang Dongping
6 January	Malaysia Masters (Draw): Host: Kuala Lumpur, Malaysia; Venue: Axiata Arena; Level: Super 500; Prize: $400,000; Format: 32MS/32WS/32MD/32WD/32XD	Score: 21–19, 21–12	
6 January	Estonian International: Host: Tallinn, Estonia; Venue: Kalev Sports Hall; Level: International Series; Prize: $10,000; Format: 32MS/32WS/32MD/32WD/32XD	(Japan) Hashiru Shimono	(France) Lucas Claerbout
6 January	Estonian International: Host: Tallinn, Estonia; Venue: Kalev Sports Hall; Level: International Series; Prize: $10,000; Format: 32MS/32WS/32MD/32WD/32XD	Score: 21–13, 21–17	
6 January	Estonian International: Host: Tallinn, Estonia; Venue: Kalev Sports Hall; Level: International Series; Prize: $10,000; Format: 32MS/32WS/32MD/32WD/32XD	(Japan) Natsuki Nidaira	(Japan) Natsuki Oie
6 January	Estonian International: Host: Tallinn, Estonia; Venue: Kalev Sports Hall; Level: International Series; Prize: $10,000; Format: 32MS/32WS/32MD/32WD/32XD	Score: 21–12, 21–5	
6 January	Estonian International: Host: Tallinn, Estonia; Venue: Kalev Sports Hall; Level: International Series; Prize: $10,000; Format: 32MS/32WS/32MD/32WD/32XD	(Chinese Taipei) Chiang Chien-wei (Chinese Taipei) Ye Hong-wei	(Chinese Taipei) Wei Chun-wei (Chinese Taipei) Wu Guan-xun
6 January	Estonian International: Host: Tallinn, Estonia; Venue: Kalev Sports Hall; Level: International Series; Prize: $10,000; Format: 32MS/32WS/32MD/32WD/32XD	Score: 21–11, 21–19	
6 January	Estonian International: Host: Tallinn, Estonia; Venue: Kalev Sports Hall; Level: International Series; Prize: $10,000; Format: 32MS/32WS/32MD/32WD/32XD	(Japan) Rena Miyaura (Japan) Saori Ozaki	(France) Vimala Hériau (France) Margot Lambert
6 January	Estonian International: Host: Tallinn, Estonia; Venue: Kalev Sports Hall; Level: International Series; Prize: $10,000; Format: 32MS/32WS/32MD/32WD/32XD	Score: 21–18, 21–18	
6 January	Estonian International: Host: Tallinn, Estonia; Venue: Kalev Sports Hall; Level: International Series; Prize: $10,000; Format: 32MS/32WS/32MD/32WD/32XD	(Japan) Yujiro Nishikawa (Japan) Saori Ozaki	(Japan) Tadayuki Urai (Japan) Rena Miyaura
6 January	Estonian International: Host: Tallinn, Estonia; Venue: Kalev Sports Hall; Level: International Series; Prize: $10,000; Format: 32MS/32WS/32MD/32WD/32XD	Score: 21–18, 21–14	
13 January	Indonesia Masters (Draw): Host: Jakarta, Indonesia; Venue: Istora Gelora Bung Karno; Level: Super 500; Prize: $400,000; Format: 32MS/32WS/32MD/32WD/32XD	(Indonesia) Anthony Sinisuka Ginting	(Denmark) Anders Antonsen
13 January	Indonesia Masters (Draw): Host: Jakarta, Indonesia; Venue: Istora Gelora Bung Karno; Level: Super 500; Prize: $400,000; Format: 32MS/32WS/32MD/32WD/32XD	Score: 17–21, 21–15, 21–9	
13 January	Indonesia Masters (Draw): Host: Jakarta, Indonesia; Venue: Istora Gelora Bung Karno; Level: Super 500; Prize: $400,000; Format: 32MS/32WS/32MD/32WD/32XD	(Thailand) Ratchanok Intanon	(Spain) Carolina Marín
13 January	Indonesia Masters (Draw): Host: Jakarta, Indonesia; Venue: Istora Gelora Bung Karno; Level: Super 500; Prize: $400,000; Format: 32MS/32WS/32MD/32WD/32XD	Score: 21–19, 11–21, 21–18	
13 January	Indonesia Masters (Draw): Host: Jakarta, Indonesia; Venue: Istora Gelora Bung Karno; Level: Super 500; Prize: $400,000; Format: 32MS/32WS/32MD/32WD/32XD	(Indonesia) Marcus Fernaldi Gideon (Indonesia) Kevin Sanjaya Sukamuljo	(Indonesia) Mohammad Ahsan (Indonesia) Hendra Setiawan
13 January	Indonesia Masters (Draw): Host: Jakarta, Indonesia; Venue: Istora Gelora Bung Karno; Level: Super 500; Prize: $400,000; Format: 32MS/32WS/32MD/32WD/32XD	Score: 21–15, 21–16	
13 January	Indonesia Masters (Draw): Host: Jakarta, Indonesia; Venue: Istora Gelora Bung Karno; Level: Super 500; Prize: $400,000; Format: 32MS/32WS/32MD/32WD/32XD	(Indonesia) Greysia Polii (Indonesia) Apriyani Rahayu	(Denmark) Maiken Fruergaard (Denmark) Sara Thygesen
13 January	Indonesia Masters (Draw): Host: Jakarta, Indonesia; Venue: Istora Gelora Bung Karno; Level: Super 500; Prize: $400,000; Format: 32MS/32WS/32MD/32WD/32XD	Score: 18–21, 21–11, 23–21	
13 January	Indonesia Masters (Draw): Host: Jakarta, Indonesia; Venue: Istora Gelora Bung Karno; Level: Super 500; Prize: $400,000; Format: 32MS/32WS/32MD/32WD/32XD	(China) Zheng Siwei (China) Huang Yaqiong	(China) Wang Yilyu (China) Huang Dongping
13 January	Indonesia Masters (Draw): Host: Jakarta, Indonesia; Venue: Istora Gelora Bung Karno; Level: Super 500; Prize: $400,000; Format: 32MS/32WS/32MD/32WD/32XD	Score: 21–9, 21–9	
13 January	Swedish Open: Host: Lund, Sweden; Venue: IFU Arena; Level: International Series; Prize: $10,000; Format: 32MS/32WS/32MD/32WD/32XD	(Denmark) Victor Svendsen	(Sweden) Felix Burestedt
13 January	Swedish Open: Host: Lund, Sweden; Venue: IFU Arena; Level: International Series; Prize: $10,000; Format: 32MS/32WS/32MD/32WD/32XD	Score: 18–8 Retired	
13 January	Swedish Open: Host: Lund, Sweden; Venue: IFU Arena; Level: International Series; Prize: $10,000; Format: 32MS/32WS/32MD/32WD/32XD	(Japan) Natsuki Nidaira	(Japan) Natsuki Oie
13 January	Swedish Open: Host: Lund, Sweden; Venue: IFU Arena; Level: International Series; Prize: $10,000; Format: 32MS/32WS/32MD/32WD/32XD	Score: 21–19, 21–8	
13 January	Swedish Open: Host: Lund, Sweden; Venue: IFU Arena; Level: International Series; Prize: $10,000; Format: 32MS/32WS/32MD/32WD/32XD	(Chinese Taipei) Chiang Chien-wei (Chinese Taipei) Ye Hong-wei	(Denmark) Daniel Lundgaard (Denmark) Mathias Thyrri
13 January	Swedish Open: Host: Lund, Sweden; Venue: IFU Arena; Level: International Series; Prize: $10,000; Format: 32MS/32WS/32MD/32WD/32XD	Score: Walkover	
13 January	Swedish Open: Host: Lund, Sweden; Venue: IFU Arena; Level: International Series; Prize: $10,000; Format: 32MS/32WS/32MD/32WD/32XD	(Denmark) Julie Finne-Ipsen (Denmark) Mai Surrow	(France) Vimala Hériau (France) Margot Lambert
13 January	Swedish Open: Host: Lund, Sweden; Venue: IFU Arena; Level: International Series; Prize: $10,000; Format: 32MS/32WS/32MD/32WD/32XD	Score: 22–20, 22–20	
13 January	Swedish Open: Host: Lund, Sweden; Venue: IFU Arena; Level: International Series; Prize: $10,000; Format: 32MS/32WS/32MD/32WD/32XD	(Japan) Yujiro Nishikawa (Japan) Saori Ozaki	(Denmark) Mathias Thyrri (Denmark) Mai Surrow
13 January	Swedish Open: Host: Lund, Sweden; Venue: IFU Arena; Level: International Series; Prize: $10,000; Format: 32MS/32WS/32MD/32WD/32XD	Score: 21–17, 21–11	
20 January	Thailand Masters (Draw): Host: Bangkok, Thailand; Venue: Indoor Stadium Huamark; Level: Super 300; Prize: $170,000; Format: 32MS/32WS/32MD/32WD/32XD	(Hong Kong) Ng Ka Long	(Japan) Kenta Nishimoto
20 January	Thailand Masters (Draw): Host: Bangkok, Thailand; Venue: Indoor Stadium Huamark; Level: Super 300; Prize: $170,000; Format: 32MS/32WS/32MD/32WD/32XD	Score: 16–21, 21–13, 21–12	
20 January	Thailand Masters (Draw): Host: Bangkok, Thailand; Venue: Indoor Stadium Huamark; Level: Super 300; Prize: $170,000; Format: 32MS/32WS/32MD/32WD/32XD	(Japan) Akane Yamaguchi	(South Korea) An Se-young
20 January	Thailand Masters (Draw): Host: Bangkok, Thailand; Venue: Indoor Stadium Huamark; Level: Super 300; Prize: $170,000; Format: 32MS/32WS/32MD/32WD/32XD	Score: 21–16, 22–20	
20 January	Thailand Masters (Draw): Host: Bangkok, Thailand; Venue: Indoor Stadium Huamark; Level: Super 300; Prize: $170,000; Format: 32MS/32WS/32MD/32WD/32XD	(Malaysia) Ong Yew Sin (Malaysia) Teo Ee Yi	(China) Huang Kaixiang (China) Liu Cheng
20 January	Thailand Masters (Draw): Host: Bangkok, Thailand; Venue: Indoor Stadium Huamark; Level: Super 300; Prize: $170,000; Format: 32MS/32WS/32MD/32WD/32XD	Score: 18–21, 21–17, 21–17	
20 January	Thailand Masters (Draw): Host: Bangkok, Thailand; Venue: Indoor Stadium Huamark; Level: Super 300; Prize: $170,000; Format: 32MS/32WS/32MD/32WD/32XD	(China) Chen Qingchen (China) Jia Yifan	(South Korea) Baek Ha-na (South Korea) Jung Kyung-eun
20 January	Thailand Masters (Draw): Host: Bangkok, Thailand; Venue: Indoor Stadium Huamark; Level: Super 300; Prize: $170,000; Format: 32MS/32WS/32MD/32WD/32XD	Score: 17–21, 21–17, 21–15	
20 January	Thailand Masters (Draw): Host: Bangkok, Thailand; Venue: Indoor Stadium Huamark; Level: Super 300; Prize: $170,000; Format: 32MS/32WS/32MD/32WD/32XD	(England) Marcus Ellis (England) Lauren Smith	(Indonesia) Hafiz Faizal (Indonesia) Gloria Emanuelle Widjaja
20 January	Thailand Masters (Draw): Host: Bangkok, Thailand; Venue: Indoor Stadium Huamark; Level: Super 300; Prize: $170,000; Format: 32MS/32WS/32MD/32WD/32XD	Score: 21–16, 13–21, 21–16	
20 January	Iceland International: Host: Reykjavík, Iceland; Venue: Tennis- og Badmintonfélag Reykjavíkur; Level: Future Series; Format: 32MS/32WS/32MD/8WD/32XD	(Indonesia) Fathurrahman Fauzi	(Spain) Tomás Toledano
20 January	Iceland International: Host: Reykjavík, Iceland; Venue: Tennis- og Badmintonfélag Reykjavíkur; Level: Future Series; Format: 32MS/32WS/32MD/8WD/32XD	Score: 21–14, 21–16	
20 January	Iceland International: Host: Reykjavík, Iceland; Venue: Tennis- og Badmintonfélag Reykjavíkur; Level: Future Series; Format: 32MS/32WS/32MD/8WD/32XD	(Scotland) Rachel Sugden	(England) Gauri Shidhaye
20 January	Iceland International: Host: Reykjavík, Iceland; Venue: Tennis- og Badmintonfélag Reykjavíkur; Level: Future Series; Format: 32MS/32WS/32MD/8WD/32XD	Score: 21–6, 21–13	
20 January	Iceland International: Host: Reykjavík, Iceland; Venue: Tennis- og Badmintonfélag Reykjavíkur; Level: Future Series; Format: 32MS/32WS/32MD/8WD/32XD	(Finland) Anton Monnberg (Finland) Jesper Paul	(Iceland) Davíð Bjarni Björnsson (Iceland) Karl Gunnarsson
20 January	Iceland International: Host: Reykjavík, Iceland; Venue: Tennis- og Badmintonfélag Reykjavíkur; Level: Future Series; Format: 32MS/32WS/32MD/8WD/32XD	Score: 26–24, 21–14	
20 January	Iceland International: Host: Reykjavík, Iceland; Venue: Tennis- og Badmintonfélag Reykjavíkur; Level: Future Series; Format: 32MS/32WS/32MD/8WD/32XD	(England) Asmita Chaudhari (England) Pamela Reyes	(England) Annie Lado (England) Holly Williams
20 January	Iceland International: Host: Reykjavík, Iceland; Venue: Tennis- og Badmintonfélag Reykjavíkur; Level: Future Series; Format: 32MS/32WS/32MD/8WD/32XD	Score: 21–19, 21–15	
20 January	Iceland International: Host: Reykjavík, Iceland; Venue: Tennis- og Badmintonfélag Reykjavíkur; Level: Future Series; Format: 32MS/32WS/32MD/8WD/32XD	(England) Alex Green (England) Annie Lado	(Scotland) Joshua Apiliga (Scotland) Rachel Sugden
20 January	Iceland International: Host: Reykjavík, Iceland; Venue: Tennis- og Badmintonfélag Reykjavíkur; Level: Future Series; Format: 32MS/32WS/32MD/8WD/32XD	Score: 21–19, 21–17	

=== February ===
Week commencing	Tournament	Champions	Runners-up
3 February	Iran Fajr International: Host: Shiraz, Iran; Venue: Shahid Dastgheib Sport Complex; Level: International Challenge; Prize: $25,000; Format: 64MS/32WS/16MD/16WD	(Canada) Xiaodong Sheng	(Belgium) Maxime Moreels
3 February	Iran Fajr International: Host: Shiraz, Iran; Venue: Shahid Dastgheib Sport Complex; Level: International Challenge; Prize: $25,000; Format: 64MS/32WS/16MD/16WD	Score: 21–17, 21–12	
3 February	Iran Fajr International: Host: Shiraz, Iran; Venue: Shahid Dastgheib Sport Complex; Level: International Challenge; Prize: $25,000; Format: 64MS/32WS/16MD/16WD	(United States) Crystal Pan	(Bulgaria) Linda Zetchiri
3 February	Iran Fajr International: Host: Shiraz, Iran; Venue: Shahid Dastgheib Sport Complex; Level: International Challenge; Prize: $25,000; Format: 64MS/32WS/16MD/16WD	Score: 21–18, 21–14	
3 February	Iran Fajr International: Host: Shiraz, Iran; Venue: Shahid Dastgheib Sport Complex; Level: International Challenge; Prize: $25,000; Format: 64MS/32WS/16MD/16WD	(Iran) Soroush Eskandari Vatannejad (Iran) Amir Jabbari	(Iran) Mehran Shahbazi (Iran) Reza Shahbazi
3 February	Iran Fajr International: Host: Shiraz, Iran; Venue: Shahid Dastgheib Sport Complex; Level: International Challenge; Prize: $25,000; Format: 64MS/32WS/16MD/16WD	Score: 21–17, 21–18	
3 February	Iran Fajr International: Host: Shiraz, Iran; Venue: Shahid Dastgheib Sport Complex; Level: International Challenge; Prize: $25,000; Format: 64MS/32WS/16MD/16WD	(Iran) Nasim Safaei (Iran) Hananeh Yaghobzadeh	(Iran) Hamedanchi Azad Hale (Iran) Pegah Kamrani
3 February	Iran Fajr International: Host: Shiraz, Iran; Venue: Shahid Dastgheib Sport Complex; Level: International Challenge; Prize: $25,000; Format: 64MS/32WS/16MD/16WD	Score: 21–17, 21–17	
10 February	Oceania Badminton Championships (Draw): Host: Ballarat, Australia; Venue: Ken Kay Badminton Stadium; Level: Continental Championships (International Challenge); Format: 128MS/64WS/32MD/32WD/64XD	(New Zealand) Abhinav Manota	(New Zealand) Edward Lau
10 February	Oceania Badminton Championships (Draw): Host: Ballarat, Australia; Venue: Ken Kay Badminton Stadium; Level: Continental Championships (International Challenge); Format: 128MS/64WS/32MD/32WD/64XD	Score: 21–17, 21–15	
10 February	Oceania Badminton Championships (Draw): Host: Ballarat, Australia; Venue: Ken Kay Badminton Stadium; Level: Continental Championships (International Challenge); Format: 128MS/64WS/32MD/32WD/64XD	(Australia) Chen Hsuan-yu	(Australia) Louisa Ma
10 February	Oceania Badminton Championships (Draw): Host: Ballarat, Australia; Venue: Ken Kay Badminton Stadium; Level: Continental Championships (International Challenge); Format: 128MS/64WS/32MD/32WD/64XD	Score: 21–15, 21–11	
10 February	Oceania Badminton Championships (Draw): Host: Ballarat, Australia; Venue: Ken Kay Badminton Stadium; Level: Continental Championships (International Challenge); Format: 128MS/64WS/32MD/32WD/64XD	(New Zealand) Oliver Leydon-Davis (New Zealand) Abhinav Manota	(Australia) Matthew Chau (Australia) Sawan Serasinghe
10 February	Oceania Badminton Championships (Draw): Host: Ballarat, Australia; Venue: Ken Kay Badminton Stadium; Level: Continental Championships (International Challenge); Format: 128MS/64WS/32MD/32WD/64XD	Score: 18–21, 21–9, 21–14	
10 February	Oceania Badminton Championships (Draw): Host: Ballarat, Australia; Venue: Ken Kay Badminton Stadium; Level: Continental Championships (International Challenge); Format: 128MS/64WS/32MD/32WD/64XD	(Australia) Setyana Mapasa (Australia) Gronya Somerville	(New Zealand) Sally Fu (New Zealand) Alyssa Tagle
10 February	Oceania Badminton Championships (Draw): Host: Ballarat, Australia; Venue: Ken Kay Badminton Stadium; Level: Continental Championships (International Challenge); Format: 128MS/64WS/32MD/32WD/64XD	Score: 21–9, 21–10	
10 February	Oceania Badminton Championships (Draw): Host: Ballarat, Australia; Venue: Ken Kay Badminton Stadium; Level: Continental Championships (International Challenge); Format: 128MS/64WS/32MD/32WD/64XD	(Australia) Simon Leung (Australia) Gronya Somerville	(Australia) Tran Hoang Pham (Australia) Sylvina Kurniawan
10 February	Oceania Badminton Championships (Draw): Host: Ballarat, Australia; Venue: Ken Kay Badminton Stadium; Level: Continental Championships (International Challenge); Format: 128MS/64WS/32MD/32WD/64XD	Score: 21–12, 21–8	
10 February	African Badminton Championships (Draw): Host: Cairo, Egypt; Venue: Cairo Stadium Indoor Halls Complex, Hall 2; Level: Continental Championships (International Challenge); Format: 64MS/32WS/32MD/16WD/32XD	(Mauritius) Georges Paul	(Nigeria) Anuoluwapo Juwon Opeyori
10 February	African Badminton Championships (Draw): Host: Cairo, Egypt; Venue: Cairo Stadium Indoor Halls Complex, Hall 2; Level: Continental Championships (International Challenge); Format: 64MS/32WS/32MD/16WD/32XD	Score: 16–21, 21–16, 23–21	
10 February	African Badminton Championships (Draw): Host: Cairo, Egypt; Venue: Cairo Stadium Indoor Halls Complex, Hall 2; Level: Continental Championships (International Challenge); Format: 64MS/32WS/32MD/16WD/32XD	(Mauritius) Kate Foo Kune	(Nigeria) Dorcas Ajoke Adesokan
10 February	African Badminton Championships (Draw): Host: Cairo, Egypt; Venue: Cairo Stadium Indoor Halls Complex, Hall 2; Level: Continental Championships (International Challenge); Format: 64MS/32WS/32MD/16WD/32XD	Score: 21–19, 21–16	
10 February	African Badminton Championships (Draw): Host: Cairo, Egypt; Venue: Cairo Stadium Indoor Halls Complex, Hall 2; Level: Continental Championships (International Challenge); Format: 64MS/32WS/32MD/16WD/32XD	(Algeria) Koceila Mammeri (Algeria) Youcef Sabri Medel	(Mauritius) Aatish Lubah (Mauritius) Georges Paul
10 February	African Badminton Championships (Draw): Host: Cairo, Egypt; Venue: Cairo Stadium Indoor Halls Complex, Hall 2; Level: Continental Championships (International Challenge); Format: 64MS/32WS/32MD/16WD/32XD	Score: 19–21, 21–14, 24–22	
10 February	African Badminton Championships (Draw): Host: Cairo, Egypt; Venue: Cairo Stadium Indoor Halls Complex, Hall 2; Level: Continental Championships (International Challenge); Format: 64MS/32WS/32MD/16WD/32XD	(Egypt) Doha Hany (Egypt) Hadia Hosny	(Nigeria) Dorcas Ajoke Adesokan (Nigeria) Uchechukwu Deborah Ukeh
10 February	African Badminton Championships (Draw): Host: Cairo, Egypt; Venue: Cairo Stadium Indoor Halls Complex, Hall 2; Level: Continental Championships (International Challenge); Format: 64MS/32WS/32MD/16WD/32XD	Score: 21–14, 21–17	
10 February	African Badminton Championships (Draw): Host: Cairo, Egypt; Venue: Cairo Stadium Indoor Halls Complex, Hall 2; Level: Continental Championships (International Challenge); Format: 64MS/32WS/32MD/16WD/32XD	(Egypt) Adham Hatem Elgamal (Egypt) Doha Hany	(Algeria) Koceila Mammeri (Algeria) Linda Mazri
10 February	African Badminton Championships (Draw): Host: Cairo, Egypt; Venue: Cairo Stadium Indoor Halls Complex, Hall 2; Level: Continental Championships (International Challenge); Format: 64MS/32WS/32MD/16WD/32XD	Score: 21–13, 18–21, 21–19	
10 February	Badminton Asia Team Championships (Draw): Host: Manila, Philippines; Venue: Rizal Memorial Coliseum; Level: Team Event; Format: 12MT/12WT	Indonesia	Malaysia
10 February	Badminton Asia Team Championships (Draw): Host: Manila, Philippines; Venue: Rizal Memorial Coliseum; Level: Team Event; Format: 12MT/12WT	Anthony Sinisuka Ginting	Lee Zii Jia
10 February	Badminton Asia Team Championships (Draw): Host: Manila, Philippines; Venue: Rizal Memorial Coliseum; Level: Team Event; Format: 12MT/12WT	Marcus Fernaldi Gideon; Kevin Sanjaya Sukamuljo	Aaron Chia; Soh Wooi Yik
10 February	Badminton Asia Team Championships (Draw): Host: Manila, Philippines; Venue: Rizal Memorial Coliseum; Level: Team Event; Format: 12MT/12WT	Jonatan Christie	Cheam June Wei
10 February	Badminton Asia Team Championships (Draw): Host: Manila, Philippines; Venue: Rizal Memorial Coliseum; Level: Team Event; Format: 12MT/12WT	Mohammad Ahsan; Fajar Alfian	Ong Yew Sin; Teo Ee Yi
10 February	Badminton Asia Team Championships (Draw): Host: Manila, Philippines; Venue: Rizal Memorial Coliseum; Level: Team Event; Format: 12MT/12WT	Shesar Hiren Rhustavito	Leong Jun Hao
10 February	Badminton Asia Team Championships (Draw): Host: Manila, Philippines; Venue: Rizal Memorial Coliseum; Level: Team Event; Format: 12MT/12WT	Score: 3–1	
10 February	Badminton Asia Team Championships (Draw): Host: Manila, Philippines; Venue: Rizal Memorial Coliseum; Level: Team Event; Format: 12MT/12WT	Japan	South Korea
10 February	Badminton Asia Team Championships (Draw): Host: Manila, Philippines; Venue: Rizal Memorial Coliseum; Level: Team Event; Format: 12MT/12WT	Akane Yamaguchi	An Se-young
10 February	Badminton Asia Team Championships (Draw): Host: Manila, Philippines; Venue: Rizal Memorial Coliseum; Level: Team Event; Format: 12MT/12WT	Yuki Fukushima; Sayaka Hirota	Lee So-hee; Shin Seung-chan
10 February	Badminton Asia Team Championships (Draw): Host: Manila, Philippines; Venue: Rizal Memorial Coliseum; Level: Team Event; Format: 12MT/12WT	Sayaka Takahashi	Sung Ji-hyun
10 February	Badminton Asia Team Championships (Draw): Host: Manila, Philippines; Venue: Rizal Memorial Coliseum; Level: Team Event; Format: 12MT/12WT	Nami Matsuyama; Chiharu Shida	Kim So-yeong; Kong Hee-yong
10 February	Badminton Asia Team Championships (Draw): Host: Manila, Philippines; Venue: Rizal Memorial Coliseum; Level: Team Event; Format: 12MT/12WT	Aya Ohori	Kim Ga-eun
10 February	Badminton Asia Team Championships (Draw): Host: Manila, Philippines; Venue: Rizal Memorial Coliseum; Level: Team Event; Format: 12MT/12WT	Score: 3–0	
10 February	European Team Badminton Championships (Draw): Host: Liévin, France; Venue: Stade Couvert Régional; Level: Team Event; Format: 34MT/29WT	Denmark	Netherlands
10 February	European Team Badminton Championships (Draw): Host: Liévin, France; Venue: Stade Couvert Régional; Level: Team Event; Format: 34MT/29WT	Viktor Axelsen	Mark Caljouw
10 February	European Team Badminton Championships (Draw): Host: Liévin, France; Venue: Stade Couvert Régional; Level: Team Event; Format: 34MT/29WT	Kim Astrup; Anders Skaarup Rasmussen	Jelle Maas; Robin Tabeling
10 February	European Team Badminton Championships (Draw): Host: Liévin, France; Venue: Stade Couvert Régional; Level: Team Event; Format: 34MT/29WT	Anders Antonsen	Joran Kweekel
10 February	European Team Badminton Championships (Draw): Host: Liévin, France; Venue: Stade Couvert Régional; Level: Team Event; Format: 34MT/29WT	Mathias Boe; Mads Conrad-Petersen	Ruben Jille; Ties van der Lecq
10 February	European Team Badminton Championships (Draw): Host: Liévin, France; Venue: Stade Couvert Régional; Level: Team Event; Format: 34MT/29WT	Jan Ø. Jørgensen	Wessel van der Aar
10 February	European Team Badminton Championships (Draw): Host: Liévin, France; Venue: Stade Couvert Régional; Level: Team Event; Format: 34MT/29WT	Score: 3–0	
10 February	European Team Badminton Championships (Draw): Host: Liévin, France; Venue: Stade Couvert Régional; Level: Team Event; Format: 34MT/29WT	Denmark	Germany
10 February	European Team Badminton Championships (Draw): Host: Liévin, France; Venue: Stade Couvert Régional; Level: Team Event; Format: 34MT/29WT	Julie Dawall Jakobsen	Yvonne Li
10 February	European Team Badminton Championships (Draw): Host: Liévin, France; Venue: Stade Couvert Régional; Level: Team Event; Format: 34MT/29WT	Alexandra Bøje; Mette Poulsen	Linda Efler; Isabel Herttrich
10 February	European Team Badminton Championships (Draw): Host: Liévin, France; Venue: Stade Couvert Régional; Level: Team Event; Format: 34MT/29WT	Line Christophersen	Fabienne Deprez
10 February	European Team Badminton Championships (Draw): Host: Liévin, France; Venue: Stade Couvert Régional; Level: Team Event; Format: 34MT/29WT	Maiken Fruergaard; Amalie Magelund	Stine Küspert; Kilasu Ostermeyer
10 February	European Team Badminton Championships (Draw): Host: Liévin, France; Venue: Stade Couvert Régional; Level: Team Event; Format: 34MT/29WT	Freja Ravn	Ann-Kathrin Spöri
10 February	European Team Badminton Championships (Draw): Host: Liévin, France; Venue: Stade Couvert Régional; Level: Team Event; Format: 34MT/29WT	Score: 3–1	
10 February	Pan Am Badminton Team Championships (Draw): Host: Salvador, Bahia, Brazil; Venue: Centro Pan-Americano de Judô; Level: Team Event; Format: 6MT/7WT	Canada	Mexico
10 February	Pan Am Badminton Team Championships (Draw): Host: Salvador, Bahia, Brazil; Venue: Centro Pan-Americano de Judô; Level: Team Event; Format: 6MT/7WT	Jason Ho-shue	Lino Muñoz
10 February	Pan Am Badminton Team Championships (Draw): Host: Salvador, Bahia, Brazil; Venue: Centro Pan-Americano de Judô; Level: Team Event; Format: 6MT/7WT	Brian Yang	Job Castillo
10 February	Pan Am Badminton Team Championships (Draw): Host: Salvador, Bahia, Brazil; Venue: Centro Pan-Americano de Judô; Level: Team Event; Format: 6MT/7WT	Antonio Li	Luis Montoya
10 February	Pan Am Badminton Team Championships (Draw): Host: Salvador, Bahia, Brazil; Venue: Centro Pan-Americano de Judô; Level: Team Event; Format: 6MT/7WT	Joshua Hurlburt-Yu; Brian Yang	Job Castillo; Lino Muñoz
10 February	Pan Am Badminton Team Championships (Draw): Host: Salvador, Bahia, Brazil; Venue: Centro Pan-Americano de Judô; Level: Team Event; Format: 6MT/7WT	Jason Ho-shue; Nyl Yakura	Andrés López; Luis Montoya
10 February	Pan Am Badminton Team Championships (Draw): Host: Salvador, Bahia, Brazil; Venue: Centro Pan-Americano de Judô; Level: Team Event; Format: 6MT/7WT	Score: 3–1	
10 February	Pan Am Badminton Team Championships (Draw): Host: Salvador, Bahia, Brazil; Venue: Centro Pan-Americano de Judô; Level: Team Event; Format: 6MT/7WT	Canada	United States
10 February	Pan Am Badminton Team Championships (Draw): Host: Salvador, Bahia, Brazil; Venue: Centro Pan-Americano de Judô; Level: Team Event; Format: 6MT/7WT	Michelle Li	Natalie Chi
10 February	Pan Am Badminton Team Championships (Draw): Host: Salvador, Bahia, Brazil; Venue: Centro Pan-Americano de Judô; Level: Team Event; Format: 6MT/7WT	Catherine Choi; Zhang Wen Yu	Chen Kuei-ya; Chinue de la Merced
10 February	Pan Am Badminton Team Championships (Draw): Host: Salvador, Bahia, Brazil; Venue: Centro Pan-Americano de Judô; Level: Team Event; Format: 6MT/7WT	Brittney Tam	Esther Shi
10 February	Pan Am Badminton Team Championships (Draw): Host: Salvador, Bahia, Brazil; Venue: Centro Pan-Americano de Judô; Level: Team Event; Format: 6MT/7WT	Rachel Honderich; Kristen Tsai	Francesca Corbett; Allison Lee
10 February	Pan Am Badminton Team Championships (Draw): Host: Salvador, Bahia, Brazil; Venue: Centro Pan-Americano de Judô; Level: Team Event; Format: 6MT/7WT	Kyleigh O'Donoghue	Sanchita Pandey
10 February	Pan Am Badminton Team Championships (Draw): Host: Salvador, Bahia, Brazil; Venue: Centro Pan-Americano de Judô; Level: Team Event; Format: 6MT/7WT	Score: 3–0	
10 February	Oceania Badminton Team Championships (Draw): Host: Ballarat, Australia; Venue: Ken Kay Badminton Stadium; Level: Team Event; Format: 5MT/4WT	Australia	New Zealand
10 February	Oceania Badminton Team Championships (Draw): Host: Ballarat, Australia; Venue: Ken Kay Badminton Stadium; Level: Team Event; Format: 5MT/4WT	Score: Round robin	
10 February	Oceania Badminton Team Championships (Draw): Host: Ballarat, Australia; Venue: Ken Kay Badminton Stadium; Level: Team Event; Format: 5MT/4WT	Australia	New Zealand
10 February	Oceania Badminton Team Championships (Draw): Host: Ballarat, Australia; Venue: Ken Kay Badminton Stadium; Level: Team Event; Format: 5MT/4WT	Score: Round robin	
10 February	African Badminton Team Championships (Draw): Host: Cairo, Egypt; Venue: Cairo Stadium Indoor Halls Complex, Hall 2; Level: Team Event; Format: 9MT/4WT	Algeria	Mauritius
10 February	African Badminton Team Championships (Draw): Host: Cairo, Egypt; Venue: Cairo Stadium Indoor Halls Complex, Hall 2; Level: Team Event; Format: 9MT/4WT	Youcef Sabri Medel	Georges Paul
10 February	African Badminton Team Championships (Draw): Host: Cairo, Egypt; Venue: Cairo Stadium Indoor Halls Complex, Hall 2; Level: Team Event; Format: 9MT/4WT	Mohamed Abderrahime Belarbi	Aatish Lubah
10 February	African Badminton Team Championships (Draw): Host: Cairo, Egypt; Venue: Cairo Stadium Indoor Halls Complex, Hall 2; Level: Team Event; Format: 9MT/4WT	Adel Hamek	Jean Bernard Bongout
10 February	African Badminton Team Championships (Draw): Host: Cairo, Egypt; Venue: Cairo Stadium Indoor Halls Complex, Hall 2; Level: Team Event; Format: 9MT/4WT	Koceila Mammeri; Youcef Sabri Medel	Aatish Lubah; Georges Paul
10 February	African Badminton Team Championships (Draw): Host: Cairo, Egypt; Venue: Cairo Stadium Indoor Halls Complex, Hall 2; Level: Team Event; Format: 9MT/4WT	Mohamed Abderrahime Belarbi; Adel Hamek	Melvin Appiah; Jean Bernard Bongout
10 February	African Badminton Team Championships (Draw): Host: Cairo, Egypt; Venue: Cairo Stadium Indoor Halls Complex, Hall 2; Level: Team Event; Format: 9MT/4WT	Score: 3–2	
10 February	African Badminton Team Championships (Draw): Host: Cairo, Egypt; Venue: Cairo Stadium Indoor Halls Complex, Hall 2; Level: Team Event; Format: 9MT/4WT	Egypt	Algeria
10 February	African Badminton Team Championships (Draw): Host: Cairo, Egypt; Venue: Cairo Stadium Indoor Halls Complex, Hall 2; Level: Team Event; Format: 9MT/4WT	Score: Round robin	
17 February	Spain Masters (Draw): Host: Barcelona, Spain; Venue: Pavelló de la Vall d'Hebron; Level: Super 300; Prize: $170,000; Format: 32MS/32WS/32MD/32WD/32XD	(Denmark) Viktor Axelsen	(Thailand) Kunlavut Vitidsarn
17 February	Spain Masters (Draw): Host: Barcelona, Spain; Venue: Pavelló de la Vall d'Hebron; Level: Super 300; Prize: $170,000; Format: 32MS/32WS/32MD/32WD/32XD	Score: 21–16, 21–13	
17 February	Spain Masters (Draw): Host: Barcelona, Spain; Venue: Pavelló de la Vall d'Hebron; Level: Super 300; Prize: $170,000; Format: 32MS/32WS/32MD/32WD/32XD	(Thailand) Pornpawee Chochuwong	(Spain) Carolina Marín
17 February	Spain Masters (Draw): Host: Barcelona, Spain; Venue: Pavelló de la Vall d'Hebron; Level: Super 300; Prize: $170,000; Format: 32MS/32WS/32MD/32WD/32XD	Score: 11–21, 21–16, 21–18	
17 February	Spain Masters (Draw): Host: Barcelona, Spain; Venue: Pavelló de la Vall d'Hebron; Level: Super 300; Prize: $170,000; Format: 32MS/32WS/32MD/32WD/32XD	(Denmark) Kim Astrup (Denmark) Anders Skaarup Rasmussen	(Chinese Taipei) Lee Yang (Chinese Taipei) Wang Chi-lin
17 February	Spain Masters (Draw): Host: Barcelona, Spain; Venue: Pavelló de la Vall d'Hebron; Level: Super 300; Prize: $170,000; Format: 32MS/32WS/32MD/32WD/32XD	Score: 21–17, 21–19	
17 February	Spain Masters (Draw): Host: Barcelona, Spain; Venue: Pavelló de la Vall d'Hebron; Level: Super 300; Prize: $170,000; Format: 32MS/32WS/32MD/32WD/32XD	(Indonesia) Greysia Polii (Indonesia) Apriyani Rahayu	(Bulgaria) Gabriela Stoeva (Bulgaria) Stefani Stoeva
17 February	Spain Masters (Draw): Host: Barcelona, Spain; Venue: Pavelló de la Vall d'Hebron; Level: Super 300; Prize: $170,000; Format: 32MS/32WS/32MD/32WD/32XD	Score: 18–21, 22–20, 21–17	
17 February	Spain Masters (Draw): Host: Barcelona, Spain; Venue: Pavelló de la Vall d'Hebron; Level: Super 300; Prize: $170,000; Format: 32MS/32WS/32MD/32WD/32XD	(South Korea) Kim Sa-rang (South Korea) Kim Ha-na	(France) Thom Gicquel (France) Delphine Delrue
17 February	Spain Masters (Draw): Host: Barcelona, Spain; Venue: Pavelló de la Vall d'Hebron; Level: Super 300; Prize: $170,000; Format: 32MS/32WS/32MD/32WD/32XD	Score: 15–21, 21–11, 21–10	
17 February	Austrian Open: Host: Vienna, Austria; Venue: Wiener Stadthalle; Level: International Challenge; Prize: $25,000; Format: 32MS/32WS/32MD/32WD/32XD	(Germany) Max Weißkirchen	(Spain) Pablo Abián
17 February	Austrian Open: Host: Vienna, Austria; Venue: Wiener Stadthalle; Level: International Challenge; Prize: $25,000; Format: 32MS/32WS/32MD/32WD/32XD	Score: 22–20, 21–15	
17 February	Austrian Open: Host: Vienna, Austria; Venue: Wiener Stadthalle; Level: International Challenge; Prize: $25,000; Format: 32MS/32WS/32MD/32WD/32XD	(Japan) Yukino Nakai	(Vietnam) Nguyễn Thùy Linh
17 February	Austrian Open: Host: Vienna, Austria; Venue: Wiener Stadthalle; Level: International Challenge; Prize: $25,000; Format: 32MS/32WS/32MD/32WD/32XD	Score: 21–13, 21–18	
17 February	Austrian Open: Host: Vienna, Austria; Venue: Wiener Stadthalle; Level: International Challenge; Prize: $25,000; Format: 32MS/32WS/32MD/32WD/32XD	(Scotland) Alexander Dunn (Scotland) Adam Hall	(Netherlands) Ruben Jille (Netherlands) Ties van der Lecq
17 February	Austrian Open: Host: Vienna, Austria; Venue: Wiener Stadthalle; Level: International Challenge; Prize: $25,000; Format: 32MS/32WS/32MD/32WD/32XD	Score: 21–18, 21–11	
17 February	Austrian Open: Host: Vienna, Austria; Venue: Wiener Stadthalle; Level: International Challenge; Prize: $25,000; Format: 32MS/32WS/32MD/32WD/32XD	(Japan) Tsukiko Yasaki (Japan) Erika Yokoyama	(Turkey) Bengisu Erçetin (Turkey) Nazlıcan İnci
17 February	Austrian Open: Host: Vienna, Austria; Venue: Wiener Stadthalle; Level: International Challenge; Prize: $25,000; Format: 32MS/32WS/32MD/32WD/32XD	Score: 21–19, 21–15	
17 February	Austrian Open: Host: Vienna, Austria; Venue: Wiener Stadthalle; Level: International Challenge; Prize: $25,000; Format: 32MS/32WS/32MD/32WD/32XD	(Denmark) Jeppe Bay (Denmark) Sara Lundgaard	(Finland) Anton Kaisti (Czech Republic) Alžběta Bášová
17 February	Austrian Open: Host: Vienna, Austria; Venue: Wiener Stadthalle; Level: International Challenge; Prize: $25,000; Format: 32MS/32WS/32MD/32WD/32XD	Score: 21–16, 21–13	
17 February	Lao International (canceled) (Note: BWF announces a revamped 2020 tournament calendar due to the COVID-19 pandemic.): Host: Vientiane, Laos; Venue: TBD; Level: International Series; Prize: $10,000; Format: 32MS/32WS/32MD/32WD/32XD		
17 February	Lao International (canceled): Host: Vientiane, Laos; Venue: TBD; Level: International Series; Prize: $10,000; Format: 32MS/32WS/32MD/32WD/32XD	Score:	
17 February	Lao International (canceled): Host: Vientiane, Laos; Venue: TBD; Level: International Series; Prize: $10,000; Format: 32MS/32WS/32MD/32WD/32XD	Score:	
17 February	Lao International (canceled): Host: Vientiane, Laos; Venue: TBD; Level: International Series; Prize: $10,000; Format: 32MS/32WS/32MD/32WD/32XD	Score:	
17 February	Lao International (canceled): Host: Vientiane, Laos; Venue: TBD; Level: International Series; Prize: $10,000; Format: 32MS/32WS/32MD/32WD/32XD	Score:	
17 February	Lao International (canceled): Host: Vientiane, Laos; Venue: TBD; Level: International Series; Prize: $10,000; Format: 32MS/32WS/32MD/32WD/32XD	Score:	
17 February	Uganda International: Host: Kampala, Uganda; Venue: Lugogo Stadium; Level: International Series; Prize: $10,000; Format: 32MS/32WS/32MD/32WD/32XD	(Hungary) Gergely Krausz	(Sri Lanka) Niluka Karunaratne
17 February	Uganda International: Host: Kampala, Uganda; Venue: Lugogo Stadium; Level: International Series; Prize: $10,000; Format: 32MS/32WS/32MD/32WD/32XD	Score: 21–18, 18–21, 21–13	
17 February	Uganda International: Host: Kampala, Uganda; Venue: Lugogo Stadium; Level: International Series; Prize: $10,000; Format: 32MS/32WS/32MD/32WD/32XD	(Myanmar) Thet Htar Thuzar	(India) Aakarshi Kashyap
17 February	Uganda International: Host: Kampala, Uganda; Venue: Lugogo Stadium; Level: International Series; Prize: $10,000; Format: 32MS/32WS/32MD/32WD/32XD	Score: 21–14, 16–21, 21–18	
17 February	Uganda International: Host: Kampala, Uganda; Venue: Lugogo Stadium; Level: International Series; Prize: $10,000; Format: 32MS/32WS/32MD/32WD/32XD	(India) Tarun Kona (India) Shivam Sharma	(Nigeria) Godwin Olofua (Nigeria) Anuoluwapo Juwon Opeyori
17 February	Uganda International: Host: Kampala, Uganda; Venue: Lugogo Stadium; Level: International Series; Prize: $10,000; Format: 32MS/32WS/32MD/32WD/32XD	Score: 21–15, 22–20	
17 February	Uganda International: Host: Kampala, Uganda; Venue: Lugogo Stadium; Level: International Series; Prize: $10,000; Format: 32MS/32WS/32MD/32WD/32XD	(India) Meghana Jakkampudi (India) Poorvisha S. Ram	(Peru) Daniela Macías (Peru) Dánica Nishimura
17 February	Uganda International: Host: Kampala, Uganda; Venue: Lugogo Stadium; Level: International Series; Prize: $10,000; Format: 32MS/32WS/32MD/32WD/32XD	Score: 21–17, 20–22, 21–14	
17 February	Uganda International: Host: Kampala, Uganda; Venue: Lugogo Stadium; Level: International Series; Prize: $10,000; Format: 32MS/32WS/32MD/32WD/32XD	(India) Tarun Kona (India) Meghana Jakkampudi	(India) Shivam Sharma (India) Poorvisha S. Ram
17 February	Uganda International: Host: Kampala, Uganda; Venue: Lugogo Stadium; Level: International Series; Prize: $10,000; Format: 32MS/32WS/32MD/32WD/32XD	Score: 21–7, 14–21, 21–16	
24 February	Slovak International: Host: Trenčín, Slovakia; Venue: Športové centrum M-Šport; Level: Future Series; Format: 32MS/32WS/32MD/32WD/32XD	(Czech Republic) Jan Louda	(England) Johnnie Torjussen
24 February	Slovak International: Host: Trenčín, Slovakia; Venue: Športové centrum M-Šport; Level: Future Series; Format: 32MS/32WS/32MD/32WD/32XD	Score: 21–18, 12–21, 21–15	
24 February	Slovak International: Host: Trenčín, Slovakia; Venue: Športové centrum M-Šport; Level: Future Series; Format: 32MS/32WS/32MD/32WD/32XD	(Chinese Taipei) Lin Jhih-yun	(Hungary) Vivien Sándorházi
24 February	Slovak International: Host: Trenčín, Slovakia; Venue: Športové centrum M-Šport; Level: Future Series; Format: 32MS/32WS/32MD/32WD/32XD	Score: 21–17, 21–6	
24 February	Slovak International: Host: Trenčín, Slovakia; Venue: Športové centrum M-Šport; Level: Future Series; Format: 32MS/32WS/32MD/32WD/32XD	(Chinese Taipei) Lin Shang-kai (Chinese Taipei) Tseng Min-hao	(Chinese Taipei) Hung Tzu-wei (Chinese Taipei) Lu Ming-che
24 February	Slovak International: Host: Trenčín, Slovakia; Venue: Športové centrum M-Šport; Level: Future Series; Format: 32MS/32WS/32MD/32WD/32XD	Score: 30–29, 25–23	
24 February	Slovak International: Host: Trenčín, Slovakia; Venue: Športové centrum M-Šport; Level: Future Series; Format: 32MS/32WS/32MD/32WD/32XD	(Chinese Taipei) Lee Chia-hsin (Chinese Taipei) Lin Jhih-yun	(Chinese Taipei) Hsieh Pei-shan (Chinese Taipei) Wu Ti-jung
24 February	Slovak International: Host: Trenčín, Slovakia; Venue: Športové centrum M-Šport; Level: Future Series; Format: 32MS/32WS/32MD/32WD/32XD	Score: 21–18, 21–18	
24 February	Slovak International: Host: Trenčín, Slovakia; Venue: Športové centrum M-Šport; Level: Future Series; Format: 32MS/32WS/32MD/32WD/32XD	(Chinese Taipei) Lu Ming-che (Chinese Taipei) Wu Ti-jung	(Chinese Taipei) Tseng Min-hao (Chinese Taipei) Hsieh Pei-shan
24 February	Slovak International: Host: Trenčín, Slovakia; Venue: Športové centrum M-Šport; Level: Future Series; Format: 32MS/32WS/32MD/32WD/32XD	Score: 21–15, 21–14	
24 February	Kenya International: Host: Mombasa, Kenya; Venue: Oshwal Academy; Level: Future Series; Format: 32MS/32WS/32MD/32WD/32XD	(India) Chirag Sen	(Nigeria) Anuoluwapo Juwon Opeyori
24 February	Kenya International: Host: Mombasa, Kenya; Venue: Oshwal Academy; Level: Future Series; Format: 32MS/32WS/32MD/32WD/32XD	Score: 21–18, 21–8	
24 February	Kenya International: Host: Mombasa, Kenya; Venue: Oshwal Academy; Level: Future Series; Format: 32MS/32WS/32MD/32WD/32XD	(India) Aakarshi Kashyap	(India) Anupama Upadhyaya
24 February	Kenya International: Host: Mombasa, Kenya; Venue: Oshwal Academy; Level: Future Series; Format: 32MS/32WS/32MD/32WD/32XD	Score: 21–15, 21–6	
24 February	Kenya International: Host: Mombasa, Kenya; Venue: Oshwal Academy; Level: Future Series; Format: 32MS/32WS/32MD/32WD/32XD	(India) Kathiravun Concheepuran Manivannan (India) Santhosh Gajendran	(Nigeria) Godwin Olofua (Nigeria) Anuoluwapo Juwon Opeyori
24 February	Kenya International: Host: Mombasa, Kenya; Venue: Oshwal Academy; Level: Future Series; Format: 32MS/32WS/32MD/32WD/32XD	Score: 21–12, 21–17	
24 February	Kenya International: Host: Mombasa, Kenya; Venue: Oshwal Academy; Level: Future Series; Format: 32MS/32WS/32MD/32WD/32XD	(Egypt) Doha Hany (Egypt) Hadia Hosny	(Pakistan) Palwasha Bashir (Pakistan) Mahoor Shahzad
24 February	Kenya International: Host: Mombasa, Kenya; Venue: Oshwal Academy; Level: Future Series; Format: 32MS/32WS/32MD/32WD/32XD	Score: 21–13, 21–17	
24 February	Kenya International: Host: Mombasa, Kenya; Venue: Oshwal Academy; Level: Future Series; Format: 32MS/32WS/32MD/32WD/32XD	(Egypt) Adham Hatem Elgamal (Egypt) Doha Hany	(Kenya) John Wanyoike (Kenya) Mercy Joseph
24 February	Kenya International: Host: Mombasa, Kenya; Venue: Oshwal Academy; Level: Future Series; Format: 32MS/32WS/32MD/32WD/32XD	Score: 21–10, 21–14	

=== March ===
Week commencing	Tournament	Champions	Runners-up
2 March	German Open (Draw) (cancelled) (Note: This tournament, originally to be played from 3 to 8 March, was later cancelled due to the COVID-19 pandemic in Germany.): Host: Mülheim, Germany; Venue: Innogy Sporthalle; Level: Super 300; Prize: $170,000; Format: 32MS/32WS/32MD/32WD/32XD		
2 March	German Open (Draw) (cancelled): Host: Mülheim, Germany; Venue: Innogy Sporthalle; Level: Super 300; Prize: $170,000; Format: 32MS/32WS/32MD/32WD/32XD	Score:	
2 March	German Open (Draw) (cancelled): Host: Mülheim, Germany; Venue: Innogy Sporthalle; Level: Super 300; Prize: $170,000; Format: 32MS/32WS/32MD/32WD/32XD	Score:	
2 March	German Open (Draw) (cancelled): Host: Mülheim, Germany; Venue: Innogy Sporthalle; Level: Super 300; Prize: $170,000; Format: 32MS/32WS/32MD/32WD/32XD	Score:	
2 March	German Open (Draw) (cancelled): Host: Mülheim, Germany; Venue: Innogy Sporthalle; Level: Super 300; Prize: $170,000; Format: 32MS/32WS/32MD/32WD/32XD	Score:	
2 March	German Open (Draw) (cancelled): Host: Mülheim, Germany; Venue: Innogy Sporthalle; Level: Super 300; Prize: $170,000; Format: 32MS/32WS/32MD/32WD/32XD	Score:	
2 March	Jamaica International: Host: Kingston, Jamaica; Venue: National Indoor Sport Centre; Level: International Series; Prize: $10,000; Format: 32MS/32WS/16MD/16WD/16XD	(Japan) Takuma Obayashi	(Japan) Yushi Tanaka
2 March	Jamaica International: Host: Kingston, Jamaica; Venue: National Indoor Sport Centre; Level: International Series; Prize: $10,000; Format: 32MS/32WS/16MD/16WD/16XD	Score: 21–11, 17–21, 21–12	
2 March	Jamaica International: Host: Kingston, Jamaica; Venue: National Indoor Sport Centre; Level: International Series; Prize: $10,000; Format: 32MS/32WS/16MD/16WD/16XD	(Japan) Momoka Kimura	(Bulgaria) Linda Zetchiri
2 March	Jamaica International: Host: Kingston, Jamaica; Venue: National Indoor Sport Centre; Level: International Series; Prize: $10,000; Format: 32MS/32WS/16MD/16WD/16XD	Score: 21–12, 21–12	
2 March	Jamaica International: Host: Kingston, Jamaica; Venue: National Indoor Sport Centre; Level: International Series; Prize: $10,000; Format: 32MS/32WS/16MD/16WD/16XD	(Guatemala) Aníbal Marroquín (Guatemala) Jonathan Solís	(Jamaica) Samuel O'Brien Ricketts (Jamaica) Shane Wilson
2 March	Jamaica International: Host: Kingston, Jamaica; Venue: National Indoor Sport Centre; Level: International Series; Prize: $10,000; Format: 32MS/32WS/16MD/16WD/16XD	Score: 22–20, 21–15	
2 March	Jamaica International: Host: Kingston, Jamaica; Venue: National Indoor Sport Centre; Level: International Series; Prize: $10,000; Format: 32MS/32WS/16MD/16WD/16XD	(Japan) Sayaka Hobara (Japan) Rena Miyaura	(Peru) Daniela Macías (Peru) Dánica Nishimura
2 March	Jamaica International: Host: Kingston, Jamaica; Venue: National Indoor Sport Centre; Level: International Series; Prize: $10,000; Format: 32MS/32WS/16MD/16WD/16XD	Score: 21–3, 21–7	
2 March	Jamaica International: Host: Kingston, Jamaica; Venue: National Indoor Sport Centre; Level: International Series; Prize: $10,000; Format: 32MS/32WS/16MD/16WD/16XD	(Guatemala) Jonathan Solís (Guatemala) Diana Corleto	(Jamaica) Dennis Coke (Jamaica) Tahlia Richardson
2 March	Jamaica International: Host: Kingston, Jamaica; Venue: National Indoor Sport Centre; Level: International Series; Prize: $10,000; Format: 32MS/32WS/16MD/16WD/16XD	Score: 23–21, 21–17	
9 March	All England Open (Draw): Host: Birmingham, England; Venue: Arena Birmingham; Level: Super 1000; Prize: $1,100,000; Format: 32MS/32WS/32MD/32WD/32XD	(Denmark) Viktor Axelsen	(Chinese Taipei) Chou Tien-chen
9 March	All England Open (Draw): Host: Birmingham, England; Venue: Arena Birmingham; Level: Super 1000; Prize: $1,100,000; Format: 32MS/32WS/32MD/32WD/32XD	Score: 21–13, 21–14	
9 March	All England Open (Draw): Host: Birmingham, England; Venue: Arena Birmingham; Level: Super 1000; Prize: $1,100,000; Format: 32MS/32WS/32MD/32WD/32XD	(Chinese Taipei) Tai Tzu-ying	(China) Chen Yufei
9 March	All England Open (Draw): Host: Birmingham, England; Venue: Arena Birmingham; Level: Super 1000; Prize: $1,100,000; Format: 32MS/32WS/32MD/32WD/32XD	Score: 21–19, 21–15	
9 March	All England Open (Draw): Host: Birmingham, England; Venue: Arena Birmingham; Level: Super 1000; Prize: $1,100,000; Format: 32MS/32WS/32MD/32WD/32XD	(Japan) Hiroyuki Endo (Japan) Yuta Watanabe	(Indonesia) Marcus Fernaldi Gideon (Indonesia) Kevin Sanjaya Sukamuljo
9 March	All England Open (Draw): Host: Birmingham, England; Venue: Arena Birmingham; Level: Super 1000; Prize: $1,100,000; Format: 32MS/32WS/32MD/32WD/32XD	Score: 21–18, 12–21, 21–19	
9 March	All England Open (Draw): Host: Birmingham, England; Venue: Arena Birmingham; Level: Super 1000; Prize: $1,100,000; Format: 32MS/32WS/32MD/32WD/32XD	(Japan) Yuki Fukushima (Japan) Sayaka Hirota	(China) Du Yue (China) Li Yinhui
9 March	All England Open (Draw): Host: Birmingham, England; Venue: Arena Birmingham; Level: Super 1000; Prize: $1,100,000; Format: 32MS/32WS/32MD/32WD/32XD	Score: 21–13, 21–15	
9 March	All England Open (Draw): Host: Birmingham, England; Venue: Arena Birmingham; Level: Super 1000; Prize: $1,100,000; Format: 32MS/32WS/32MD/32WD/32XD	(Indonesia) Praveen Jordan (Indonesia) Melati Daeva Oktavianti	(Thailand) Dechapol Puavaranukroh (Thailand) Sapsiree Taerattanachai
9 March	All England Open (Draw): Host: Birmingham, England; Venue: Arena Birmingham; Level: Super 1000; Prize: $1,100,000; Format: 32MS/32WS/32MD/32WD/32XD	Score: 21–15, 17–21, 21–8	
9 March	KaBaL International Karviná (canceled) (Note: BWF confirmed the cancelation of several tournaments due to the COVID-19 pandemic.): Host: Karviná, Czech Republic; Venue: TBD; Level: International Series; Format: 32MS/16WS/8MD/8WD/16XD		
9 March	KaBaL International Karviná (canceled): Host: Karviná, Czech Republic; Venue: TBD; Level: International Series; Format: 32MS/16WS/8MD/8WD/16XD	Score:	
9 March	KaBaL International Karviná (canceled): Host: Karviná, Czech Republic; Venue: TBD; Level: International Series; Format: 32MS/16WS/8MD/8WD/16XD	Score:	
9 March	KaBaL International Karviná (canceled): Host: Karviná, Czech Republic; Venue: TBD; Level: International Series; Format: 32MS/16WS/8MD/8WD/16XD	Score:	
9 March	KaBaL International Karviná (canceled): Host: Karviná, Czech Republic; Venue: TBD; Level: International Series; Format: 32MS/16WS/8MD/8WD/16XD	Score:	
9 March	KaBaL International Karviná (canceled): Host: Karviná, Czech Republic; Venue: TBD; Level: International Series; Format: 32MS/16WS/8MD/8WD/16XD	Score:	
9 March	Peru Future Series: Host: Lima, Peru; Venue: Villa Deportiva Nacional; Level: Future Series; Prize: $2,700; Format: 32MS/16WS/8MD/8WD/16XD	(Japan) Yushi Tanaka	(Japan) Takuma Obayashi
9 March	Peru Future Series: Host: Lima, Peru; Venue: Villa Deportiva Nacional; Level: Future Series; Prize: $2,700; Format: 32MS/16WS/8MD/8WD/16XD	Score: 21–13, 8–21, 21–18	
9 March	Peru Future Series: Host: Lima, Peru; Venue: Villa Deportiva Nacional; Level: Future Series; Prize: $2,700; Format: 32MS/16WS/8MD/8WD/16XD	(Japan) Momoka Kimura	(Peru) Daniela Macías
9 March	Peru Future Series: Host: Lima, Peru; Venue: Villa Deportiva Nacional; Level: Future Series; Prize: $2,700; Format: 32MS/16WS/8MD/8WD/16XD	Score: 21–14, 21–19	
9 March	Peru Future Series: Host: Lima, Peru; Venue: Villa Deportiva Nacional; Level: Future Series; Prize: $2,700; Format: 32MS/16WS/8MD/8WD/16XD	(Guatemala) Rubén Castellanos (Guatemala) Christopher Martínez	(Argentina) Mateo Delmastro (Argentina) Santiago Otero
9 March	Peru Future Series: Host: Lima, Peru; Venue: Villa Deportiva Nacional; Level: Future Series; Prize: $2,700; Format: 32MS/16WS/8MD/8WD/16XD	Score: 21–12, 21–12	
9 March	Peru Future Series: Host: Lima, Peru; Venue: Villa Deportiva Nacional; Level: Future Series; Prize: $2,700; Format: 32MS/16WS/8MD/8WD/16XD	(Peru) Daniela Macías (Peru) Dánica Nishimura	(Peru) Inés Castillo (Peru) Paula la Torre Regal
9 March	Peru Future Series: Host: Lima, Peru; Venue: Villa Deportiva Nacional; Level: Future Series; Prize: $2,700; Format: 32MS/16WS/8MD/8WD/16XD	Score: 21–19, 20–22, 21–19	
9 March	Peru Future Series: Host: Lima, Peru; Venue: Villa Deportiva Nacional; Level: Future Series; Prize: $2,700; Format: 32MS/16WS/8MD/8WD/16XD	(Peru) Daniel la Torre Regal (Peru) Paula la Torre Regal	(Peru) Santiago de la Oliva (Peru) Ines Mendoza Rosell
9 March	Peru Future Series: Host: Lima, Peru; Venue: Villa Deportiva Nacional; Level: Future Series; Prize: $2,700; Format: 32MS/16WS/8MD/8WD/16XD	Score: 21–16, 21–18	
16 March	Swiss Open (Draw) (cancelled) (Note: Two tournaments which were previously suspended, have been cancelled due to the COVID-19 pandemic.): Host: Basel, Switzerland; Venue: St. Jakobshalle; Level: Super 300; Prize: $175,000; Format: 32MS/32WS/32MD/32WD/32XD		
16 March	Swiss Open (Draw) (cancelled): Host: Basel, Switzerland; Venue: St. Jakobshalle; Level: Super 300; Prize: $175,000; Format: 32MS/32WS/32MD/32WD/32XD	Score:	
16 March	Swiss Open (Draw) (cancelled): Host: Basel, Switzerland; Venue: St. Jakobshalle; Level: Super 300; Prize: $175,000; Format: 32MS/32WS/32MD/32WD/32XD	Score:	
16 March	Swiss Open (Draw) (cancelled): Host: Basel, Switzerland; Venue: St. Jakobshalle; Level: Super 300; Prize: $175,000; Format: 32MS/32WS/32MD/32WD/32XD	Score:	
16 March	Swiss Open (Draw) (cancelled): Host: Basel, Switzerland; Venue: St. Jakobshalle; Level: Super 300; Prize: $175,000; Format: 32MS/32WS/32MD/32WD/32XD	Score:	
16 March	Swiss Open (Draw) (cancelled): Host: Basel, Switzerland; Venue: St. Jakobshalle; Level: Super 300; Prize: $175,000; Format: 32MS/32WS/32MD/32WD/32XD	Score:	
16 March	Giraldilla International (canceled): Host: Havana, Cuba; Venue: Coliseo de la Ciudad Deportiva; Level: Future Series; Format: 32MS/16WS/8MD/8WD/16XD		
16 March	Giraldilla International (canceled): Host: Havana, Cuba; Venue: Coliseo de la Ciudad Deportiva; Level: Future Series; Format: 32MS/16WS/8MD/8WD/16XD	Score:	
16 March	Giraldilla International (canceled): Host: Havana, Cuba; Venue: Coliseo de la Ciudad Deportiva; Level: Future Series; Format: 32MS/16WS/8MD/8WD/16XD	Score:	
16 March	Giraldilla International (canceled): Host: Havana, Cuba; Venue: Coliseo de la Ciudad Deportiva; Level: Future Series; Format: 32MS/16WS/8MD/8WD/16XD	Score:	
16 March	Giraldilla International (canceled): Host: Havana, Cuba; Venue: Coliseo de la Ciudad Deportiva; Level: Future Series; Format: 32MS/16WS/8MD/8WD/16XD	Score:	
16 March	Giraldilla International (canceled): Host: Havana, Cuba; Venue: Coliseo de la Ciudad Deportiva; Level: Future Series; Format: 32MS/16WS/8MD/8WD/16XD	Score:	
16 March	North Harbour International (canceled): Host: Auckland, New Zealand; Venue: North Harbour Badminton Centre; Level: Future Series; Prize: $5,000; Format: 64MS/32WS/32MD/16WD/32XD		
16 March	North Harbour International (canceled): Host: Auckland, New Zealand; Venue: North Harbour Badminton Centre; Level: Future Series; Prize: $5,000; Format: 64MS/32WS/32MD/16WD/32XD	Score:	
16 March	North Harbour International (canceled): Host: Auckland, New Zealand; Venue: North Harbour Badminton Centre; Level: Future Series; Prize: $5,000; Format: 64MS/32WS/32MD/16WD/32XD	Score:	
16 March	North Harbour International (canceled): Host: Auckland, New Zealand; Venue: North Harbour Badminton Centre; Level: Future Series; Prize: $5,000; Format: 64MS/32WS/32MD/16WD/32XD	Score:	
16 March	North Harbour International (canceled): Host: Auckland, New Zealand; Venue: North Harbour Badminton Centre; Level: Future Series; Prize: $5,000; Format: 64MS/32WS/32MD/16WD/32XD	Score:	
16 March	North Harbour International (canceled): Host: Auckland, New Zealand; Venue: North Harbour Badminton Centre; Level: Future Series; Prize: $5,000; Format: 64MS/32WS/32MD/16WD/32XD	Score:	
23 March	Orléans Masters (Draw) (canceled): Host: Orléans, France; Venue: Palais des Sports; Level: Super 100; Prize: $90,000; Format: 48MS/32WS/32MD/32WD/32XD		
23 March	Orléans Masters (Draw) (canceled): Host: Orléans, France; Venue: Palais des Sports; Level: Super 100; Prize: $90,000; Format: 48MS/32WS/32MD/32WD/32XD	Score:	
23 March	Orléans Masters (Draw) (canceled): Host: Orléans, France; Venue: Palais des Sports; Level: Super 100; Prize: $90,000; Format: 48MS/32WS/32MD/32WD/32XD	Score:	
23 March	Orléans Masters (Draw) (canceled): Host: Orléans, France; Venue: Palais des Sports; Level: Super 100; Prize: $90,000; Format: 48MS/32WS/32MD/32WD/32XD	Score:	
23 March	Orléans Masters (Draw) (canceled): Host: Orléans, France; Venue: Palais des Sports; Level: Super 100; Prize: $90,000; Format: 48MS/32WS/32MD/32WD/32XD	Score:	
23 March	Orléans Masters (Draw) (canceled): Host: Orléans, France; Venue: Palais des Sports; Level: Super 100; Prize: $90,000; Format: 48MS/32WS/32MD/32WD/32XD	Score:	
23 March	Polish Open (cancelled) (Note: Update on Tournaments Grade 2, 3 and Junior cancelled due to the COVID-19 pandemic.): Host: Kraków, Poland; Venue: Sport & Entertainment Hall Suche Stawy; Level: International Challenge; Prize: $25,000; Format: 32MS/32WS/24MD/24WD/24XD		
23 March	Polish Open (cancelled): Host: Kraków, Poland; Venue: Sport & Entertainment Hall Suche Stawy; Level: International Challenge; Prize: $25,000; Format: 32MS/32WS/24MD/24WD/24XD	Score:	
23 March	Polish Open (cancelled): Host: Kraków, Poland; Venue: Sport & Entertainment Hall Suche Stawy; Level: International Challenge; Prize: $25,000; Format: 32MS/32WS/24MD/24WD/24XD	Score:	
23 March	Polish Open (cancelled): Host: Kraków, Poland; Venue: Sport & Entertainment Hall Suche Stawy; Level: International Challenge; Prize: $25,000; Format: 32MS/32WS/24MD/24WD/24XD	Score:	
23 March	Polish Open (cancelled): Host: Kraków, Poland; Venue: Sport & Entertainment Hall Suche Stawy; Level: International Challenge; Prize: $25,000; Format: 32MS/32WS/24MD/24WD/24XD	Score:	
23 March	Polish Open (cancelled): Host: Kraków, Poland; Venue: Sport & Entertainment Hall Suche Stawy; Level: International Challenge; Prize: $25,000; Format: 32MS/32WS/24MD/24WD/24XD	Score:	
23 March	Waikato International (canceled): Host: Hamilton, New Zealand; Venue: Eastling Badminton Stadium; Level: International Series; Prize: $10,000; Format: 64MS/32WS/32MD/16WD/32XD		
23 March	Waikato International (canceled): Host: Hamilton, New Zealand; Venue: Eastling Badminton Stadium; Level: International Series; Prize: $10,000; Format: 64MS/32WS/32MD/16WD/32XD	Score:	
23 March	Waikato International (canceled): Host: Hamilton, New Zealand; Venue: Eastling Badminton Stadium; Level: International Series; Prize: $10,000; Format: 64MS/32WS/32MD/16WD/32XD	Score:	
23 March	Waikato International (canceled): Host: Hamilton, New Zealand; Venue: Eastling Badminton Stadium; Level: International Series; Prize: $10,000; Format: 64MS/32WS/32MD/16WD/32XD	Score:	
23 March	Waikato International (canceled): Host: Hamilton, New Zealand; Venue: Eastling Badminton Stadium; Level: International Series; Prize: $10,000; Format: 64MS/32WS/32MD/16WD/32XD	Score:	
23 March	Waikato International (canceled): Host: Hamilton, New Zealand; Venue: Eastling Badminton Stadium; Level: International Series; Prize: $10,000; Format: 64MS/32WS/32MD/16WD/32XD	Score:	
30 March (canceled)	Canadian International: Host: Fort McMurray, Canada; Venue: Suncor Community Leisure Centre; Level: International Challenge; Prize: $25,000; Format: 32MS/24WS/16MD/16WD/16XD		
30 March (canceled)	Canadian International: Host: Fort McMurray, Canada; Venue: Suncor Community Leisure Centre; Level: International Challenge; Prize: $25,000; Format: 32MS/24WS/16MD/16WD/16XD	Score:	
30 March (canceled)	Canadian International: Host: Fort McMurray, Canada; Venue: Suncor Community Leisure Centre; Level: International Challenge; Prize: $25,000; Format: 32MS/24WS/16MD/16WD/16XD	Score:	
30 March (canceled)	Canadian International: Host: Fort McMurray, Canada; Venue: Suncor Community Leisure Centre; Level: International Challenge; Prize: $25,000; Format: 32MS/24WS/16MD/16WD/16XD	Score:	
30 March (canceled)	Canadian International: Host: Fort McMurray, Canada; Venue: Suncor Community Leisure Centre; Level: International Challenge; Prize: $25,000; Format: 32MS/24WS/16MD/16WD/16XD	Score:	
30 March (canceled)	Canadian International: Host: Fort McMurray, Canada; Venue: Suncor Community Leisure Centre; Level: International Challenge; Prize: $25,000; Format: 32MS/24WS/16MD/16WD/16XD	Score:	
30 March (canceled)	Osaka International: Host: Moriguchi, Osaka, Japan; Venue: Moriguchi City Gymnasium; Level: International Challenge; Prize: $25,000; Format: 32MS/32WS/32MD/32WD/32XD		
30 March (canceled)	Osaka International: Host: Moriguchi, Osaka, Japan; Venue: Moriguchi City Gymnasium; Level: International Challenge; Prize: $25,000; Format: 32MS/32WS/32MD/32WD/32XD	Score:	
30 March (canceled)	Osaka International: Host: Moriguchi, Osaka, Japan; Venue: Moriguchi City Gymnasium; Level: International Challenge; Prize: $25,000; Format: 32MS/32WS/32MD/32WD/32XD	Score:	
30 March (canceled)	Osaka International: Host: Moriguchi, Osaka, Japan; Venue: Moriguchi City Gymnasium; Level: International Challenge; Prize: $25,000; Format: 32MS/32WS/32MD/32WD/32XD	Score:	
30 March (canceled)	Osaka International: Host: Moriguchi, Osaka, Japan; Venue: Moriguchi City Gymnasium; Level: International Challenge; Prize: $25,000; Format: 32MS/32WS/32MD/32WD/32XD	Score:	
30 March (canceled)	Osaka International: Host: Moriguchi, Osaka, Japan; Venue: Moriguchi City Gymnasium; Level: International Challenge; Prize: $25,000; Format: 32MS/32WS/32MD/32WD/32XD	Score:	
30 March (canceled)	Finnish Open: Host: Vantaa, Finland; Venue: Energia Areena; Level: International Challenge; Prize: $25,000; Format: 32MS/32WS/32MD/32WD/32XD		
30 March (canceled)	Finnish Open: Host: Vantaa, Finland; Venue: Energia Areena; Level: International Challenge; Prize: $25,000; Format: 32MS/32WS/32MD/32WD/32XD	Score:	
30 March (canceled)	Finnish Open: Host: Vantaa, Finland; Venue: Energia Areena; Level: International Challenge; Prize: $25,000; Format: 32MS/32WS/32MD/32WD/32XD	Score:	
30 March (canceled)	Finnish Open: Host: Vantaa, Finland; Venue: Energia Areena; Level: International Challenge; Prize: $25,000; Format: 32MS/32WS/32MD/32WD/32XD	Score:	
30 March (canceled)	Finnish Open: Host: Vantaa, Finland; Venue: Energia Areena; Level: International Challenge; Prize: $25,000; Format: 32MS/32WS/32MD/32WD/32XD	Score:	
30 March (canceled)	Finnish Open: Host: Vantaa, Finland; Venue: Energia Areena; Level: International Challenge; Prize: $25,000; Format: 32MS/32WS/32MD/32WD/32XD	Score:	

=== April ===
Week commencing	Tournament	Champions	Runners-up
6 April (canceled) (Note: BWF confirmed the cancelation of several tournaments due to the COVID-19 pandemic.)	Singapore Open (Draw): Host: Singapore; Venue: Singapore Indoor Stadium; Level: Super 500; Prize: $400,000; Format: 32MS/32WS/32MD/32WD/32XD		
6 April (canceled)	Singapore Open (Draw): Host: Singapore; Venue: Singapore Indoor Stadium; Level: Super 500; Prize: $400,000; Format: 32MS/32WS/32MD/32WD/32XD	Score:	
6 April (canceled)	Singapore Open (Draw): Host: Singapore; Venue: Singapore Indoor Stadium; Level: Super 500; Prize: $400,000; Format: 32MS/32WS/32MD/32WD/32XD	Score:	
6 April (canceled)	Singapore Open (Draw): Host: Singapore; Venue: Singapore Indoor Stadium; Level: Super 500; Prize: $400,000; Format: 32MS/32WS/32MD/32WD/32XD	Score:	
6 April (canceled)	Singapore Open (Draw): Host: Singapore; Venue: Singapore Indoor Stadium; Level: Super 500; Prize: $400,000; Format: 32MS/32WS/32MD/32WD/32XD	Score:	
6 April (canceled)	Singapore Open (Draw): Host: Singapore; Venue: Singapore Indoor Stadium; Level: Super 500; Prize: $400,000; Format: 32MS/32WS/32MD/32WD/32XD	Score:	
6 April (canceled)	Dutch International: Host: Wateringen, Netherlands; Venue: VELO Hall; Level: International Series; Prize: $10,000; Format: TBD		
6 April (canceled)	Dutch International: Host: Wateringen, Netherlands; Venue: VELO Hall; Level: International Series; Prize: $10,000; Format: TBD	Score:	
6 April (canceled)	Dutch International: Host: Wateringen, Netherlands; Venue: VELO Hall; Level: International Series; Prize: $10,000; Format: TBD	Score:	
6 April (canceled)	Dutch International: Host: Wateringen, Netherlands; Venue: VELO Hall; Level: International Series; Prize: $10,000; Format: TBD	Score:	
6 April (canceled)	Dutch International: Host: Wateringen, Netherlands; Venue: VELO Hall; Level: International Series; Prize: $10,000; Format: TBD	Score:	
6 April (canceled)	Dutch International: Host: Wateringen, Netherlands; Venue: VELO Hall; Level: International Series; Prize: $10,000; Format: TBD	Score:	
13 April (canceled)	Peru International: Host: Lima, Peru; Venue: TBD; Level: International Series; Prize: $10,000; Format: TBD		
13 April (canceled)	Peru International: Host: Lima, Peru; Venue: TBD; Level: International Series; Prize: $10,000; Format: TBD	Score:	
13 April (canceled)	Peru International: Host: Lima, Peru; Venue: TBD; Level: International Series; Prize: $10,000; Format: TBD	Score:	
13 April (canceled)	Peru International: Host: Lima, Peru; Venue: TBD; Level: International Series; Prize: $10,000; Format: TBD	Score:	
13 April (canceled)	Peru International: Host: Lima, Peru; Venue: TBD; Level: International Series; Prize: $10,000; Format: TBD	Score:	
13 April (canceled)	Peru International: Host: Lima, Peru; Venue: TBD; Level: International Series; Prize: $10,000; Format: TBD	Score:	
20 April	Badminton Asia Championships (Draw) (canceled): Host: Manila, Philippines; Venue: TBD; Level: Continental Championships (Super 500); Format: TBD		
20 April	Badminton Asia Championships (Draw) (canceled): Host: Manila, Philippines; Venue: TBD; Level: Continental Championships (Super 500); Format: TBD	Score:	
20 April	Badminton Asia Championships (Draw) (canceled): Host: Manila, Philippines; Venue: TBD; Level: Continental Championships (Super 500); Format: TBD	Score:	
20 April	Badminton Asia Championships (Draw) (canceled): Host: Manila, Philippines; Venue: TBD; Level: Continental Championships (Super 500); Format: TBD	Score:	
20 April	Badminton Asia Championships (Draw) (canceled): Host: Manila, Philippines; Venue: TBD; Level: Continental Championships (Super 500); Format: TBD	Score:	
20 April	Badminton Asia Championships (Draw) (canceled): Host: Manila, Philippines; Venue: TBD; Level: Continental Championships (Super 500); Format: TBD	Score:	
20 April	European Badminton Championships (Draw) (cancelled) (Note: Two tournaments which were previously suspended, have been cancelled due to the COVID-19 pandemic.): Host: Kyiv, Ukraine; Venue: Palace of Sports; Level: Continental Championships (Super 300); Format: 48MS/48WS/32MD/32WD/32XD		
20 April	European Badminton Championships (Draw) (cancelled): Host: Kyiv, Ukraine; Venue: Palace of Sports; Level: Continental Championships (Super 300); Format: 48MS/48WS/32MD/32WD/32XD	Score:	
20 April	European Badminton Championships (Draw) (cancelled): Host: Kyiv, Ukraine; Venue: Palace of Sports; Level: Continental Championships (Super 300); Format: 48MS/48WS/32MD/32WD/32XD	Score:	
20 April	European Badminton Championships (Draw) (cancelled): Host: Kyiv, Ukraine; Venue: Palace of Sports; Level: Continental Championships (Super 300); Format: 48MS/48WS/32MD/32WD/32XD	Score:	
20 April	European Badminton Championships (Draw) (cancelled): Host: Kyiv, Ukraine; Venue: Palace of Sports; Level: Continental Championships (Super 300); Format: 48MS/48WS/32MD/32WD/32XD	Score:	
20 April	European Badminton Championships (Draw) (cancelled): Host: Kyiv, Ukraine; Venue: Palace of Sports; Level: Continental Championships (Super 300); Format: 48MS/48WS/32MD/32WD/32XD	Score:	
20 April	Pan Am Badminton Championships (Draw) (canceled): Host: Lima, Peru; Venue: TBC; Level: Continental Championships; Format: TBD		
20 April	Pan Am Badminton Championships (Draw) (canceled): Host: Lima, Peru; Venue: TBC; Level: Continental Championships; Format: TBD	Score:	
20 April	Pan Am Badminton Championships (Draw) (canceled): Host: Lima, Peru; Venue: TBC; Level: Continental Championships; Format: TBD	Score:	
20 April	Pan Am Badminton Championships (Draw) (canceled): Host: Lima, Peru; Venue: TBC; Level: Continental Championships; Format: TBD	Score:	
20 April	Pan Am Badminton Championships (Draw) (canceled): Host: Lima, Peru; Venue: TBC; Level: Continental Championships; Format: TBD	Score:	
20 April	Pan Am Badminton Championships (Draw) (canceled): Host: Lima, Peru; Venue: TBC; Level: Continental Championships; Format: TBD	Score:	

=== May ===
Week commencing	Tournament	Champions	Runners-up
4 May (canceled) (Note: BWF confirmed the cancelation of several tournaments due to the COVID-19 pandemic.)	Denmark International: Host: Farum, Denmark; Venue: TBD; Level: International Challenge; Prize: $25,000; Format: TBD		
4 May (canceled)	Denmark International: Host: Farum, Denmark; Venue: TBD; Level: International Challenge; Prize: $25,000; Format: TBD	Score:	
4 May (canceled)	Denmark International: Host: Farum, Denmark; Venue: TBD; Level: International Challenge; Prize: $25,000; Format: TBD	Score:	
4 May (canceled)	Denmark International: Host: Farum, Denmark; Venue: TBD; Level: International Challenge; Prize: $25,000; Format: TBD	Score:	
4 May (canceled)	Denmark International: Host: Farum, Denmark; Venue: TBD; Level: International Challenge; Prize: $25,000; Format: TBD	Score:	
4 May (canceled)	Denmark International: Host: Farum, Denmark; Venue: TBD; Level: International Challenge; Prize: $25,000; Format: TBD	Score:	
11 May (canceled)	Slovenian International: Host: Medvode, Slovenia; Venue: TBD; Level: International Series; Prize: $10,000; Format: TBD		
11 May (canceled)	Slovenian International: Host: Medvode, Slovenia; Venue: TBD; Level: International Series; Prize: $10,000; Format: TBD	Score:	
11 May (canceled)	Slovenian International: Host: Medvode, Slovenia; Venue: TBD; Level: International Series; Prize: $10,000; Format: TBD	Score:	
11 May (canceled)	Slovenian International: Host: Medvode, Slovenia; Venue: TBD; Level: International Series; Prize: $10,000; Format: TBD	Score:	
11 May (canceled)	Slovenian International: Host: Medvode, Slovenia; Venue: TBD; Level: International Series; Prize: $10,000; Format: TBD	Score:	
11 May (canceled)	Slovenian International: Host: Medvode, Slovenia; Venue: TBD; Level: International Series; Prize: $10,000; Format: TBD	Score:	
25 May (canceled)	Mongolia International: Host: Ulaanbaatar, Mongolia; Venue: TBD; Level: International Challenge; Prize: $25,000; Format: TBD		
25 May (canceled)	Mongolia International: Host: Ulaanbaatar, Mongolia; Venue: TBD; Level: International Challenge; Prize: $25,000; Format: TBD	Score:	
25 May (canceled)	Mongolia International: Host: Ulaanbaatar, Mongolia; Venue: TBD; Level: International Challenge; Prize: $25,000; Format: TBD	Score:	
25 May (canceled)	Mongolia International: Host: Ulaanbaatar, Mongolia; Venue: TBD; Level: International Challenge; Prize: $25,000; Format: TBD	Score:	
25 May (canceled)	Mongolia International: Host: Ulaanbaatar, Mongolia; Venue: TBD; Level: International Challenge; Prize: $25,000; Format: TBD	Score:	
25 May (canceled)	Mongolia International: Host: Ulaanbaatar, Mongolia; Venue: TBD; Level: International Challenge; Prize: $25,000; Format: TBD	Score:	

=== June ===
Week commencing	Tournament	Champions	Runners-up
1 June	Australian Open (Draw) (canceled) (Note: Update on Tournaments Grade 2, 3 and Junior cancelled due to the COVID-19 pandemic.): Host: Sydney, Australia; Venue: TBD; Level: Super 300; Prize: $170,000; Format: 32MS/32WS/32MD/32WD/32XD		
1 June	Australian Open (Draw) (canceled): Host: Sydney, Australia; Venue: TBD; Level: Super 300; Prize: $170,000; Format: 32MS/32WS/32MD/32WD/32XD	Score:	
1 June	Australian Open (Draw) (canceled): Host: Sydney, Australia; Venue: TBD; Level: Super 300; Prize: $170,000; Format: 32MS/32WS/32MD/32WD/32XD	Score:	
1 June	Australian Open (Draw) (canceled): Host: Sydney, Australia; Venue: TBD; Level: Super 300; Prize: $170,000; Format: 32MS/32WS/32MD/32WD/32XD	Score:	
1 June	Australian Open (Draw) (canceled): Host: Sydney, Australia; Venue: TBD; Level: Super 300; Prize: $170,000; Format: 32MS/32WS/32MD/32WD/32XD	Score:	
1 June	Australian Open (Draw) (canceled): Host: Sydney, Australia; Venue: TBD; Level: Super 300; Prize: $170,000; Format: 32MS/32WS/32MD/32WD/32XD	Score:	
1 June	Lithuanian International (canceled) (Note: BWF confirmed the cancelation of several tournaments due to the COVID-19 pandemic.): Host: Panevėžys, Lithuania; Venue: TBD; Level: Future Series; Format: TBD		
1 June	Lithuanian International (canceled): Host: Panevėžys, Lithuania; Venue: TBD; Level: Future Series; Format: TBD	Score:	
1 June	Lithuanian International (canceled): Host: Panevėžys, Lithuania; Venue: TBD; Level: Future Series; Format: TBD	Score:	
1 June	Lithuanian International (canceled): Host: Panevėžys, Lithuania; Venue: TBD; Level: Future Series; Format: TBD	Score:	
1 June	Lithuanian International (canceled): Host: Panevėžys, Lithuania; Venue: TBD; Level: Future Series; Format: TBD	Score:	
1 June	Lithuanian International (canceled): Host: Panevėžys, Lithuania; Venue: TBD; Level: Future Series; Format: TBD	Score:	
8 June (canceled)	German International: Host: Bonn, Germany; Venue: TBD; Level: Future Series; Format: TBD		
8 June (canceled)	German International: Host: Bonn, Germany; Venue: TBD; Level: Future Series; Format: TBD	Score:	
8 June (canceled)	German International: Host: Bonn, Germany; Venue: TBD; Level: Future Series; Format: TBD	Score:	
8 June (canceled)	German International: Host: Bonn, Germany; Venue: TBD; Level: Future Series; Format: TBD	Score:	
8 June (canceled)	German International: Host: Bonn, Germany; Venue: TBD; Level: Future Series; Format: TBD	Score:	
8 June (canceled)	German International: Host: Bonn, Germany; Venue: TBD; Level: Future Series; Format: TBD	Score:	
15 June	Malaysia International Series (cancelled): Host: Kuala Lumpur, Malaysia; Venue: TBD; Level: International Series; Prize: $10,000; Format: TBD		
15 June	Malaysia International Series (cancelled): Host: Kuala Lumpur, Malaysia; Venue: TBD; Level: International Series; Prize: $10,000; Format: TBD	Score:	
15 June	Malaysia International Series (cancelled): Host: Kuala Lumpur, Malaysia; Venue: TBD; Level: International Series; Prize: $10,000; Format: TBD	Score:	
15 June	Malaysia International Series (cancelled): Host: Kuala Lumpur, Malaysia; Venue: TBD; Level: International Series; Prize: $10,000; Format: TBD	Score:	
15 June	Malaysia International Series (cancelled): Host: Kuala Lumpur, Malaysia; Venue: TBD; Level: International Series; Prize: $10,000; Format: TBD	Score:	
15 June	Malaysia International Series (cancelled): Host: Kuala Lumpur, Malaysia; Venue: TBD; Level: International Series; Prize: $10,000; Format: TBD	Score:	
15 June	Styrian International (canceled): Host: Graz, Austria; Venue: TBD; Level: Future Series; Format: TBD		
15 June	Styrian International (canceled): Host: Graz, Austria; Venue: TBD; Level: Future Series; Format: TBD	Score:	
15 June	Styrian International (canceled): Host: Graz, Austria; Venue: TBD; Level: Future Series; Format: TBD	Score:	
15 June	Styrian International (canceled): Host: Graz, Austria; Venue: TBD; Level: Future Series; Format: TBD	Score:	
15 June	Styrian International (canceled): Host: Graz, Austria; Venue: TBD; Level: Future Series; Format: TBD	Score:	
15 June	Styrian International (canceled): Host: Graz, Austria; Venue: TBD; Level: Future Series; Format: TBD	Score:	
22 June (canceled)	U.S. Open (Draw): Host: Fullerton, California, United States; Venue: TBD; Level: Super 300; Prize: $170,000; Format: 32MS/32WS/32MD/32WD/32XD		
22 June (canceled)	U.S. Open (Draw): Host: Fullerton, California, United States; Venue: TBD; Level: Super 300; Prize: $170,000; Format: 32MS/32WS/32MD/32WD/32XD	Score:	
22 June (canceled)	U.S. Open (Draw): Host: Fullerton, California, United States; Venue: TBD; Level: Super 300; Prize: $170,000; Format: 32MS/32WS/32MD/32WD/32XD	Score:	
22 June (canceled)	U.S. Open (Draw): Host: Fullerton, California, United States; Venue: TBD; Level: Super 300; Prize: $170,000; Format: 32MS/32WS/32MD/32WD/32XD	Score:	
22 June (canceled)	U.S. Open (Draw): Host: Fullerton, California, United States; Venue: TBD; Level: Super 300; Prize: $170,000; Format: 32MS/32WS/32MD/32WD/32XD	Score:	
22 June (canceled)	U.S. Open (Draw): Host: Fullerton, California, United States; Venue: TBD; Level: Super 300; Prize: $170,000; Format: 32MS/32WS/32MD/32WD/32XD	Score:	
29 June	Canada Open (Draw) (canceled): Host: Calgary, Canada; Venue: TBD; Level: Super 100; Prize: $90,000; Format: 48MS/32WS/32MD/32WD/32XD		
29 June	Canada Open (Draw) (canceled): Host: Calgary, Canada; Venue: TBD; Level: Super 100; Prize: $90,000; Format: 48MS/32WS/32MD/32WD/32XD	Score:	
29 June	Canada Open (Draw) (canceled): Host: Calgary, Canada; Venue: TBD; Level: Super 100; Prize: $90,000; Format: 48MS/32WS/32MD/32WD/32XD	Score:	
29 June	Canada Open (Draw) (canceled): Host: Calgary, Canada; Venue: TBD; Level: Super 100; Prize: $90,000; Format: 48MS/32WS/32MD/32WD/32XD	Score:	
29 June	Canada Open (Draw) (canceled): Host: Calgary, Canada; Venue: TBD; Level: Super 100; Prize: $90,000; Format: 48MS/32WS/32MD/32WD/32XD	Score:	
29 June	Canada Open (Draw) (canceled): Host: Calgary, Canada; Venue: TBD; Level: Super 100; Prize: $90,000; Format: 48MS/32WS/32MD/32WD/32XD	Score:	
29 June	Lagos International (cancelled) (Note: Tournament cancelled or postponed due to the COVID-19 pandemic on 18 September 2020.): Host: Lagos, Nigeria; Venue: TBD; Level: International Challenge; Prize: $25,000; Format: TBD		
29 June	Lagos International (cancelled): Host: Lagos, Nigeria; Venue: TBD; Level: International Challenge; Prize: $25,000; Format: TBD	Score:	
29 June	Lagos International (cancelled): Host: Lagos, Nigeria; Venue: TBD; Level: International Challenge; Prize: $25,000; Format: TBD	Score:	
29 June	Lagos International (cancelled): Host: Lagos, Nigeria; Venue: TBD; Level: International Challenge; Prize: $25,000; Format: TBD	Score:	
29 June	Lagos International (cancelled): Host: Lagos, Nigeria; Venue: TBD; Level: International Challenge; Prize: $25,000; Format: TBD	Score:	
29 June	Lagos International (cancelled): Host: Lagos, Nigeria; Venue: TBD; Level: International Challenge; Prize: $25,000; Format: TBD	Score:	

=== July ===
Week commencing	Tournament	Champions	Runners-up
6 July (canceled) (Note: BWF confirmed the cancelation of several tournaments due to the COVID-19 pandemic.)	Russian Open (Draw): Host: Vladivostok, Russia; Venue: TBD; Level: Super 100; Prize: $90,000; Format: 48MS/32WS/32MD/32WD/32XD		
6 July (canceled)	Russian Open (Draw): Host: Vladivostok, Russia; Venue: TBD; Level: Super 100; Prize: $90,000; Format: 48MS/32WS/32MD/32WD/32XD	Score:	
6 July (canceled)	Russian Open (Draw): Host: Vladivostok, Russia; Venue: TBD; Level: Super 100; Prize: $90,000; Format: 48MS/32WS/32MD/32WD/32XD	Score:	
6 July (canceled)	Russian Open (Draw): Host: Vladivostok, Russia; Venue: TBD; Level: Super 100; Prize: $90,000; Format: 48MS/32WS/32MD/32WD/32XD	Score:	
6 July (canceled)	Russian Open (Draw): Host: Vladivostok, Russia; Venue: TBD; Level: Super 100; Prize: $90,000; Format: 48MS/32WS/32MD/32WD/32XD	Score:	
6 July (canceled)	Russian Open (Draw): Host: Vladivostok, Russia; Venue: TBD; Level: Super 100; Prize: $90,000; Format: 48MS/32WS/32MD/32WD/32XD	Score:	
13 July (cancelled) (Note: This tournament, originally to be played from 16 to 19 July, was later cancelled due to the COVID-19 pandemic.)	Azerbaijan International: Host: Baku, Azerbaijan; Venue: TBD; Level: International Challenge; Prize: $25,000; Format: TBD		
13 July (cancelled)	Azerbaijan International: Host: Baku, Azerbaijan; Venue: TBD; Level: International Challenge; Prize: $25,000; Format: TBD	Score:	
13 July (cancelled)	Azerbaijan International: Host: Baku, Azerbaijan; Venue: TBD; Level: International Challenge; Prize: $25,000; Format: TBD	Score:	
13 July (cancelled)	Azerbaijan International: Host: Baku, Azerbaijan; Venue: TBD; Level: International Challenge; Prize: $25,000; Format: TBD	Score:	
13 July (cancelled)	Azerbaijan International: Host: Baku, Azerbaijan; Venue: TBD; Level: International Challenge; Prize: $25,000; Format: TBD	Score:	
13 July (cancelled)	Azerbaijan International: Host: Baku, Azerbaijan; Venue: TBD; Level: International Challenge; Prize: $25,000; Format: TBD	Score:	
20 July (postponed) (Note: The International Olympic Committee (IOC), the Tokyo Organising Committee of the Olympic and Paralympic Games (TOCOG) and the Japanese government confirmed that the 2020 Summer Olympics was postponed for 364 days due to the COVID-19 pandemic.)	Olympic Games (Draw): Host: Tokyo, Japan; Venue: Musashino Forest Sport Plaza; Level: World Championships; Format: 38MS/38WS/16MD/16WD/16XD		
20 July (postponed)	Olympic Games (Draw): Host: Tokyo, Japan; Venue: Musashino Forest Sport Plaza; Level: World Championships; Format: 38MS/38WS/16MD/16WD/16XD	Score:	
20 July (postponed)	Olympic Games (Draw): Host: Tokyo, Japan; Venue: Musashino Forest Sport Plaza; Level: World Championships; Format: 38MS/38WS/16MD/16WD/16XD	Score:	
20 July (postponed)	Olympic Games (Draw): Host: Tokyo, Japan; Venue: Musashino Forest Sport Plaza; Level: World Championships; Format: 38MS/38WS/16MD/16WD/16XD	Score:	
20 July (postponed)	Olympic Games (Draw): Host: Tokyo, Japan; Venue: Musashino Forest Sport Plaza; Level: World Championships; Format: 38MS/38WS/16MD/16WD/16XD	Score:	
20 July (postponed)	Olympic Games (Draw): Host: Tokyo, Japan; Venue: Musashino Forest Sport Plaza; Level: World Championships; Format: 38MS/38WS/16MD/16WD/16XD	Score:	

=== August ===
Week commencing	Tournament	Champions	Runners-up
10 August (cancelled)	Hyderabad Open (Draw) (Note: Grade 2, 3, and Junior tournaments were cancelled due to the COVID-19 pandemic.): Host: Hyderabad, India; Venue: TBD; Level: Super 100; Prize: $90,000; Format: 48MS/32WS/32MD/32WD/32XD		
10 August (cancelled)	Hyderabad Open (Draw): Host: Hyderabad, India; Venue: TBD; Level: Super 100; Prize: $90,000; Format: 48MS/32WS/32MD/32WD/32XD	Score:	
10 August (cancelled)	Hyderabad Open (Draw): Host: Hyderabad, India; Venue: TBD; Level: Super 100; Prize: $90,000; Format: 48MS/32WS/32MD/32WD/32XD	Score:	
10 August (cancelled)	Hyderabad Open (Draw): Host: Hyderabad, India; Venue: TBD; Level: Super 100; Prize: $90,000; Format: 48MS/32WS/32MD/32WD/32XD	Score:	
10 August (cancelled)	Hyderabad Open (Draw): Host: Hyderabad, India; Venue: TBD; Level: Super 100; Prize: $90,000; Format: 48MS/32WS/32MD/32WD/32XD	Score:	
10 August (cancelled)	Hyderabad Open (Draw): Host: Hyderabad, India; Venue: TBD; Level: Super 100; Prize: $90,000; Format: 48MS/32WS/32MD/32WD/32XD	Score:	
10 August (cancelled)	Bulgarian International (Note: Tournament cancelled on 29 June 2020.): Host: Sofia, Bulgaria; Venue: TBD; Level: International Series; Prize: $10,000; Format: TBD		
10 August (cancelled)	Bulgarian International: Host: Sofia, Bulgaria; Venue: TBD; Level: International Series; Prize: $10,000; Format: TBD	Score:	
10 August (cancelled)	Bulgarian International: Host: Sofia, Bulgaria; Venue: TBD; Level: International Series; Prize: $10,000; Format: TBD	Score:	
10 August (cancelled)	Bulgarian International: Host: Sofia, Bulgaria; Venue: TBD; Level: International Series; Prize: $10,000; Format: TBD	Score:	
10 August (cancelled)	Bulgarian International: Host: Sofia, Bulgaria; Venue: TBD; Level: International Series; Prize: $10,000; Format: TBD	Score:	
10 August (cancelled)	Bulgarian International: Host: Sofia, Bulgaria; Venue: TBD; Level: International Series; Prize: $10,000; Format: TBD	Score:	
17 August (cancelled) (Note: BWF confirmed the cancelation of several tournaments due to the COVID-19 pandemic.)	Akita Masters (Draw): Host: Akita, Akita Prefecture, Japan; Venue: TBD; Level: Super 100; Prize: $90,000; Format: 48MS/32WS/32MD/32WD/32XD		
17 August (cancelled)	Akita Masters (Draw): Host: Akita, Akita Prefecture, Japan; Venue: TBD; Level: Super 100; Prize: $90,000; Format: 48MS/32WS/32MD/32WD/32XD	Score:	
17 August (cancelled)	Akita Masters (Draw): Host: Akita, Akita Prefecture, Japan; Venue: TBD; Level: Super 100; Prize: $90,000; Format: 48MS/32WS/32MD/32WD/32XD	Score:	
17 August (cancelled)	Akita Masters (Draw): Host: Akita, Akita Prefecture, Japan; Venue: TBD; Level: Super 100; Prize: $90,000; Format: 48MS/32WS/32MD/32WD/32XD	Score:	
17 August (cancelled)	Akita Masters (Draw): Host: Akita, Akita Prefecture, Japan; Venue: TBD; Level: Super 100; Prize: $90,000; Format: 48MS/32WS/32MD/32WD/32XD	Score:	
17 August (cancelled)	Akita Masters (Draw): Host: Akita, Akita Prefecture, Japan; Venue: TBD; Level: Super 100; Prize: $90,000; Format: 48MS/32WS/32MD/32WD/32XD	Score:	
24 August (cancelled)	Lingshui China Masters (Draw) (Note: This tournament, originally to be played from 25 February until 1 March before being moved to 5–10 May, was later cancelled due to the COVID-19 pandemic.): Host: Lingshui, China; Venue: Agile Stadium of Lingshui Culture and Sports Square; Level: Super 100; Prize: $90,000; Format: 48MS/32WS/32MD/32WD/32XD		
24 August (cancelled)	Lingshui China Masters (Draw): Host: Lingshui, China; Venue: Agile Stadium of Lingshui Culture and Sports Square; Level: Super 100; Prize: $90,000; Format: 48MS/32WS/32MD/32WD/32XD	Score:	
24 August (cancelled)	Lingshui China Masters (Draw): Host: Lingshui, China; Venue: Agile Stadium of Lingshui Culture and Sports Square; Level: Super 100; Prize: $90,000; Format: 48MS/32WS/32MD/32WD/32XD	Score:	
24 August (cancelled)	Lingshui China Masters (Draw): Host: Lingshui, China; Venue: Agile Stadium of Lingshui Culture and Sports Square; Level: Super 100; Prize: $90,000; Format: 48MS/32WS/32MD/32WD/32XD	Score:	
24 August (cancelled)	Lingshui China Masters (Draw): Host: Lingshui, China; Venue: Agile Stadium of Lingshui Culture and Sports Square; Level: Super 100; Prize: $90,000; Format: 48MS/32WS/32MD/32WD/32XD	Score:	
24 August (cancelled)	Lingshui China Masters (Draw): Host: Lingshui, China; Venue: Agile Stadium of Lingshui Culture and Sports Square; Level: Super 100; Prize: $90,000; Format: 48MS/32WS/32MD/32WD/32XD	Score:	
24 August (cancelled)	Vietnam Open (Draw): Host: Da Nang, Vietnam; Venue: TBD; Level: Super 100; Prize: $90,000; Format: 48MS/32WS/32MD/32WD/32XD		
24 August (cancelled)	Vietnam Open (Draw): Host: Da Nang, Vietnam; Venue: TBD; Level: Super 100; Prize: $90,000; Format: 48MS/32WS/32MD/32WD/32XD	Score:	
24 August (cancelled)	Vietnam Open (Draw): Host: Da Nang, Vietnam; Venue: TBD; Level: Super 100; Prize: $90,000; Format: 48MS/32WS/32MD/32WD/32XD	Score:	
24 August (cancelled)	Vietnam Open (Draw): Host: Da Nang, Vietnam; Venue: TBD; Level: Super 100; Prize: $90,000; Format: 48MS/32WS/32MD/32WD/32XD	Score:	
24 August (cancelled)	Vietnam Open (Draw): Host: Da Nang, Vietnam; Venue: TBD; Level: Super 100; Prize: $90,000; Format: 48MS/32WS/32MD/32WD/32XD	Score:	
24 August (cancelled)	Vietnam Open (Draw): Host: Da Nang, Vietnam; Venue: TBD; Level: Super 100; Prize: $90,000; Format: 48MS/32WS/32MD/32WD/32XD	Score:	
24 August	Latvia International: Host: Jelgava, Latvia; Venue: Zemgales Olimpiskais centrs; Level: Future Series; Format: 32MS/32WS/16MD/16WD/16XD	(Estonia) Mihkel Laanes	(Estonia) Hans-Kristjan Pilve
24 August	Latvia International: Host: Jelgava, Latvia; Venue: Zemgales Olimpiskais centrs; Level: Future Series; Format: 32MS/32WS/16MD/16WD/16XD	Score: 21–12, 18–21, 21–16	
24 August	Latvia International: Host: Jelgava, Latvia; Venue: Zemgales Olimpiskais centrs; Level: Future Series; Format: 32MS/32WS/16MD/16WD/16XD	(Estonia) Catlyn Kruus	(Italy) Yasmine Hamza
24 August	Latvia International: Host: Jelgava, Latvia; Venue: Zemgales Olimpiskais centrs; Level: Future Series; Format: 32MS/32WS/16MD/16WD/16XD	Score: 21–15, 21–16	
24 August	Latvia International: Host: Jelgava, Latvia; Venue: Zemgales Olimpiskais centrs; Level: Future Series; Format: 32MS/32WS/16MD/16WD/16XD	(Estonia) Mikk Järveoja (Estonia) Mihkel Laanes	(Estonia) Karl Kert (Estonia) Mihkel Talts
24 August	Latvia International: Host: Jelgava, Latvia; Venue: Zemgales Olimpiskais centrs; Level: Future Series; Format: 32MS/32WS/16MD/16WD/16XD	Score: 23–21, 15–21, 21–13	
24 August	Latvia International: Host: Jelgava, Latvia; Venue: Zemgales Olimpiskais centrs; Level: Future Series; Format: 32MS/32WS/16MD/16WD/16XD	(Estonia) Kati-Kreet Marran (Estonia) Helina Rüütel	(Italy) Katharina Fink (Italy) Yasmine Hamza
24 August	Latvia International: Host: Jelgava, Latvia; Venue: Zemgales Olimpiskais centrs; Level: Future Series; Format: 32MS/32WS/16MD/16WD/16XD	Score: 21–11, 21–12	
24 August	Latvia International: Host: Jelgava, Latvia; Venue: Zemgales Olimpiskais centrs; Level: Future Series; Format: 32MS/32WS/16MD/16WD/16XD	(Estonia) Mihkel Laanes (Estonia) Helina Rüütel	(Estonia) Oskar Männik (Estonia) Ramona Üprus
24 August	Latvia International: Host: Jelgava, Latvia; Venue: Zemgales Olimpiskais centrs; Level: Future Series; Format: 32MS/32WS/16MD/16WD/16XD	Score: 21–15, 21–11	
31 August	Taipei Open (Draw) (cancelled) (Note: Tournament cancelled or postponed due to the COVID-19 pandemic on 29 July 2020.): Host: Taipei, Taiwan; Venue: TBD; Level: Super 300; Prize: $500,000; Format: 32MS/32WS/32MD/32WD/32XD		
31 August	Taipei Open (Draw) (cancelled): Host: Taipei, Taiwan; Venue: TBD; Level: Super 300; Prize: $500,000; Format: 32MS/32WS/32MD/32WD/32XD	Score:	
31 August	Taipei Open (Draw) (cancelled): Host: Taipei, Taiwan; Venue: TBD; Level: Super 300; Prize: $500,000; Format: 32MS/32WS/32MD/32WD/32XD	Score:	
31 August	Taipei Open (Draw) (cancelled): Host: Taipei, Taiwan; Venue: TBD; Level: Super 300; Prize: $500,000; Format: 32MS/32WS/32MD/32WD/32XD	Score:	
31 August	Taipei Open (Draw) (cancelled): Host: Taipei, Taiwan; Venue: TBD; Level: Super 300; Prize: $500,000; Format: 32MS/32WS/32MD/32WD/32XD	Score:	
31 August	Taipei Open (Draw) (cancelled): Host: Taipei, Taiwan; Venue: TBD; Level: Super 300; Prize: $500,000; Format: 32MS/32WS/32MD/32WD/32XD	Score:	
31 August	Kharkiv International (cancelled): Host: Kharkiv, Ukraine; Venue: TBD; Level: International Series; Prize: $10,000; Format: TBD		
31 August	Kharkiv International (cancelled): Host: Kharkiv, Ukraine; Venue: TBD; Level: International Series; Prize: $10,000; Format: TBD	Score:	
31 August	Kharkiv International (cancelled): Host: Kharkiv, Ukraine; Venue: TBD; Level: International Series; Prize: $10,000; Format: TBD	Score:	
31 August	Kharkiv International (cancelled): Host: Kharkiv, Ukraine; Venue: TBD; Level: International Series; Prize: $10,000; Format: TBD	Score:	
31 August	Kharkiv International (cancelled): Host: Kharkiv, Ukraine; Venue: TBD; Level: International Series; Prize: $10,000; Format: TBD	Score:	
31 August	Kharkiv International (cancelled): Host: Kharkiv, Ukraine; Venue: TBD; Level: International Series; Prize: $10,000; Format: TBD	Score:	

=== September ===
Week commencing	Tournament	Champions	Runners-up
7 September	Korea Open (Draw) (cancelled) (Note: Tournament cancelled or postponed due to the COVID-19 pandemic on 29 July 2020.): Host: Seoul, South Korea; Venue: TBD; Level: Super 500; Prize: $400,000; Format: 32MS/32WS/32MD/32WD/32XD		
7 September	Korea Open (Draw) (cancelled): Host: Seoul, South Korea; Venue: TBD; Level: Super 500; Prize: $400,000; Format: 32MS/32WS/32MD/32WD/32XD	Score:	
7 September	Korea Open (Draw) (cancelled): Host: Seoul, South Korea; Venue: TBD; Level: Super 500; Prize: $400,000; Format: 32MS/32WS/32MD/32WD/32XD	Score:	
7 September	Korea Open (Draw) (cancelled): Host: Seoul, South Korea; Venue: TBD; Level: Super 500; Prize: $400,000; Format: 32MS/32WS/32MD/32WD/32XD	Score:	
7 September	Korea Open (Draw) (cancelled): Host: Seoul, South Korea; Venue: TBD; Level: Super 500; Prize: $400,000; Format: 32MS/32WS/32MD/32WD/32XD	Score:	
7 September	Korea Open (Draw) (cancelled): Host: Seoul, South Korea; Venue: TBD; Level: Super 500; Prize: $400,000; Format: 32MS/32WS/32MD/32WD/32XD	Score:	
7 September	Belgian International (cancelled) (Note: Tournament cancelled on 29 June 2020.): Host: Leuven, Belgium; Venue: TBD; Level: International Challenge; Prize: $25,000; Format: TBD		
7 September	Belgian International (cancelled): Host: Leuven, Belgium; Venue: TBD; Level: International Challenge; Prize: $25,000; Format: TBD	Score:	
7 September	Belgian International (cancelled): Host: Leuven, Belgium; Venue: TBD; Level: International Challenge; Prize: $25,000; Format: TBD	Score:	
7 September	Belgian International (cancelled): Host: Leuven, Belgium; Venue: TBD; Level: International Challenge; Prize: $25,000; Format: TBD	Score:	
7 September	Belgian International (cancelled): Host: Leuven, Belgium; Venue: TBD; Level: International Challenge; Prize: $25,000; Format: TBD	Score:	
7 September	Belgian International (cancelled): Host: Leuven, Belgium; Venue: TBD; Level: International Challenge; Prize: $25,000; Format: TBD	Score:	
7 September	Kathmandu International (cancelled) (Note: Update on .): Host: Tripureshwar, Nepal; Venue: TBD; Level: Future Series; Format: TBD		
7 September	Kathmandu International (cancelled): Host: Tripureshwar, Nepal; Venue: TBD; Level: Future Series; Format: TBD	Score:	
7 September	Kathmandu International (cancelled): Host: Tripureshwar, Nepal; Venue: TBD; Level: Future Series; Format: TBD	Score:	
7 September	Kathmandu International (cancelled): Host: Tripureshwar, Nepal; Venue: TBD; Level: Future Series; Format: TBD	Score:	
7 September	Kathmandu International (cancelled): Host: Tripureshwar, Nepal; Venue: TBD; Level: Future Series; Format: TBD	Score:	
7 September	Kathmandu International (cancelled): Host: Tripureshwar, Nepal; Venue: TBD; Level: Future Series; Format: TBD	Score:	
7 September	Sydney International (cancelled) (Note: Two Australian tournaments cancelled in September due to the COVID-19 pandemic.): Host: Sydney, Australia; Venue: TBD; Level: Future Series; Format: TBD		
7 September	Sydney International (cancelled): Host: Sydney, Australia; Venue: TBD; Level: Future Series; Format: TBD	Score:	
7 September	Sydney International (cancelled): Host: Sydney, Australia; Venue: TBD; Level: Future Series; Format: TBD	Score:	
7 September	Sydney International (cancelled): Host: Sydney, Australia; Venue: TBD; Level: Future Series; Format: TBD	Score:	
7 September	Sydney International (cancelled): Host: Sydney, Australia; Venue: TBD; Level: Future Series; Format: TBD	Score:	
7 September	Sydney International (cancelled): Host: Sydney, Australia; Venue: TBD; Level: Future Series; Format: TBD	Score:	
14 September	China Open (Draw) (cancelled): Host: Changzhou, China; Venue: TBD; Level: Super 1000; Prize: $1,100,000; Format: 32MS/32WS/32MD/32WD/32XD		
14 September	China Open (Draw) (cancelled): Host: Changzhou, China; Venue: TBD; Level: Super 1000; Prize: $1,100,000; Format: 32MS/32WS/32MD/32WD/32XD	Score:	
14 September	China Open (Draw) (cancelled): Host: Changzhou, China; Venue: TBD; Level: Super 1000; Prize: $1,100,000; Format: 32MS/32WS/32MD/32WD/32XD	Score:	
14 September	China Open (Draw) (cancelled): Host: Changzhou, China; Venue: TBD; Level: Super 1000; Prize: $1,100,000; Format: 32MS/32WS/32MD/32WD/32XD	Score:	
14 September	China Open (Draw) (cancelled): Host: Changzhou, China; Venue: TBD; Level: Super 1000; Prize: $1,100,000; Format: 32MS/32WS/32MD/32WD/32XD	Score:	
14 September	China Open (Draw) (cancelled): Host: Changzhou, China; Venue: TBD; Level: Super 1000; Prize: $1,100,000; Format: 32MS/32WS/32MD/32WD/32XD	Score:	
14 September	Bendigo International (cancelled): Host: Bendigo, Australia; Venue: TBD; Level: International Series; Prize: $10,000; Format: TBD		
14 September	Bendigo International (cancelled): Host: Bendigo, Australia; Venue: TBD; Level: International Series; Prize: $10,000; Format: TBD	Score:	
14 September	Bendigo International (cancelled): Host: Bendigo, Australia; Venue: TBD; Level: International Series; Prize: $10,000; Format: TBD	Score:	
14 September	Bendigo International (cancelled): Host: Bendigo, Australia; Venue: TBD; Level: International Series; Prize: $10,000; Format: TBD	Score:	
14 September	Bendigo International (cancelled): Host: Bendigo, Australia; Venue: TBD; Level: International Series; Prize: $10,000; Format: TBD	Score:	
14 September	Bendigo International (cancelled): Host: Bendigo, Australia; Venue: TBD; Level: International Series; Prize: $10,000; Format: TBD	Score:	
14 September	Polish International (cancelled) (Note: Update on Tournaments Grade 2, 3 and Junior cancelled due to the COVID-19 pandemic.): Host: Rzeszów, Poland; Venue: TBD; Level: International Series; Prize: $10,000; Format: TBD		
14 September	Polish International (cancelled): Host: Rzeszów, Poland; Venue: TBD; Level: International Series; Prize: $10,000; Format: TBD	Score:	
14 September	Polish International (cancelled): Host: Rzeszów, Poland; Venue: TBD; Level: International Series; Prize: $10,000; Format: TBD	Score:	
14 September	Polish International (cancelled): Host: Rzeszów, Poland; Venue: TBD; Level: International Series; Prize: $10,000; Format: TBD	Score:	
14 September	Polish International (cancelled): Host: Rzeszów, Poland; Venue: TBD; Level: International Series; Prize: $10,000; Format: TBD	Score:	
14 September	Polish International (cancelled): Host: Rzeszów, Poland; Venue: TBD; Level: International Series; Prize: $10,000; Format: TBD	Score:	
14 September	Maldives Future Series (cancelled) (Note: BWF confirmed the cancellation of several tournaments due to the COVID-19 pandemic.): Host: Malé, Maldives; Venue: TBD; Level: Future Series; Format: TBD		
14 September	Maldives Future Series (cancelled): Host: Malé, Maldives; Venue: TBD; Level: Future Series; Format: TBD	Score:	
14 September	Maldives Future Series (cancelled): Host: Malé, Maldives; Venue: TBD; Level: Future Series; Format: TBD	Score:	
14 September	Maldives Future Series (cancelled): Host: Malé, Maldives; Venue: TBD; Level: Future Series; Format: TBD	Score:	
14 September	Maldives Future Series (cancelled): Host: Malé, Maldives; Venue: TBD; Level: Future Series; Format: TBD	Score:	
14 September	Maldives Future Series (cancelled): Host: Malé, Maldives; Venue: TBD; Level: Future Series; Format: TBD	Score:	
14 September	Benin International (cancelled) (Note: Tournament cancelled or postponed due to the COVID-19 pandemic on 18 September 2020.): Host: Cotonou, Benin; Venue: TBD; Level: Future Series; Format: TBD		
14 September	Benin International (cancelled): Host: Cotonou, Benin; Venue: TBD; Level: Future Series; Format: TBD	Score:	
14 September	Benin International (cancelled): Host: Cotonou, Benin; Venue: TBD; Level: Future Series; Format: TBD	Score:	
14 September	Benin International (cancelled): Host: Cotonou, Benin; Venue: TBD; Level: Future Series; Format: TBD	Score:	
14 September	Benin International (cancelled): Host: Cotonou, Benin; Venue: TBD; Level: Future Series; Format: TBD	Score:	
14 September	Benin International (cancelled): Host: Cotonou, Benin; Venue: TBD; Level: Future Series; Format: TBD	Score:	
21 September	Japan Open (Draw) (cancelled): Host: Tokyo, Japan; Venue: TBD; Level: Super 750; Prize: $750,000; Format: 32MS/32WS/32MD/32WD/32XD		
21 September	Japan Open (Draw) (cancelled): Host: Tokyo, Japan; Venue: TBD; Level: Super 750; Prize: $750,000; Format: 32MS/32WS/32MD/32WD/32XD	Score:	
21 September	Japan Open (Draw) (cancelled): Host: Tokyo, Japan; Venue: TBD; Level: Super 750; Prize: $750,000; Format: 32MS/32WS/32MD/32WD/32XD	Score:	
21 September	Japan Open (Draw) (cancelled): Host: Tokyo, Japan; Venue: TBD; Level: Super 750; Prize: $750,000; Format: 32MS/32WS/32MD/32WD/32XD	Score:	
21 September	Japan Open (Draw) (cancelled): Host: Tokyo, Japan; Venue: TBD; Level: Super 750; Prize: $750,000; Format: 32MS/32WS/32MD/32WD/32XD	Score:	
21 September	Japan Open (Draw) (cancelled): Host: Tokyo, Japan; Venue: TBD; Level: Super 750; Prize: $750,000; Format: 32MS/32WS/32MD/32WD/32XD	Score:	
21 September	Maldives International (cancelled): Host: Malé, Maldives; Venue: TBD; Level: International Challenge; Prize: $25,000; Format: TBD		
21 September	Maldives International (cancelled): Host: Malé, Maldives; Venue: TBD; Level: International Challenge; Prize: $25,000; Format: TBD	Score:	
21 September	Maldives International (cancelled): Host: Malé, Maldives; Venue: TBD; Level: International Challenge; Prize: $25,000; Format: TBD	Score:	
21 September	Maldives International (cancelled): Host: Malé, Maldives; Venue: TBD; Level: International Challenge; Prize: $25,000; Format: TBD	Score:	
21 September	Maldives International (cancelled): Host: Malé, Maldives; Venue: TBD; Level: International Challenge; Prize: $25,000; Format: TBD	Score:	
21 September	Maldives International (cancelled): Host: Malé, Maldives; Venue: TBD; Level: International Challenge; Prize: $25,000; Format: TBD	Score:	
21 September	Spanish International (cancelled): Host: Madrid, Spain; Venue: TBD; Level: International Challenge; Prize: $25,000; Format: TBD		
21 September	Spanish International (cancelled): Host: Madrid, Spain; Venue: TBD; Level: International Challenge; Prize: $25,000; Format: TBD	Score:	
21 September	Spanish International (cancelled): Host: Madrid, Spain; Venue: TBD; Level: International Challenge; Prize: $25,000; Format: TBD	Score:	
21 September	Spanish International (cancelled): Host: Madrid, Spain; Venue: TBD; Level: International Challenge; Prize: $25,000; Format: TBD	Score:	
21 September	Spanish International (cancelled): Host: Madrid, Spain; Venue: TBD; Level: International Challenge; Prize: $25,000; Format: TBD	Score:	
21 September	Spanish International (cancelled): Host: Madrid, Spain; Venue: TBD; Level: International Challenge; Prize: $25,000; Format: TBD	Score:	
21 September	Guatemala International Series (cancelled) (Note: Tournament cancelled or postponed due to the COVID-19 pandemic on 25 August 2020.): Host: Guatemala City, Guatemala; Venue: TBD; Level: International Series; Prize: $10,000; Format: TBD		
21 September	Guatemala International Series (cancelled): Host: Guatemala City, Guatemala; Venue: TBD; Level: International Series; Prize: $10,000; Format: TBD	Score:	
21 September	Guatemala International Series (cancelled): Host: Guatemala City, Guatemala; Venue: TBD; Level: International Series; Prize: $10,000; Format: TBD	Score:	
21 September	Guatemala International Series (cancelled): Host: Guatemala City, Guatemala; Venue: TBD; Level: International Series; Prize: $10,000; Format: TBD	Score:	
21 September	Guatemala International Series (cancelled): Host: Guatemala City, Guatemala; Venue: TBD; Level: International Series; Prize: $10,000; Format: TBD	Score:	
21 September	Guatemala International Series (cancelled): Host: Guatemala City, Guatemala; Venue: TBD; Level: International Series; Prize: $10,000; Format: TBD	Score:	
21 September	Croatian International (cancelled): Host: Zagreb, Croatia; Venue: Dom Sportova; Level: Future Series; Prize: $500; Format: 32MS/32WS/24MD/24WD/24XD		
21 September	Croatian International (cancelled): Host: Zagreb, Croatia; Venue: Dom Sportova; Level: Future Series; Prize: $500; Format: 32MS/32WS/24MD/24WD/24XD	Score:	
21 September	Croatian International (cancelled): Host: Zagreb, Croatia; Venue: Dom Sportova; Level: Future Series; Prize: $500; Format: 32MS/32WS/24MD/24WD/24XD	Score:	
21 September	Croatian International (cancelled): Host: Zagreb, Croatia; Venue: Dom Sportova; Level: Future Series; Prize: $500; Format: 32MS/32WS/24MD/24WD/24XD	Score:	
21 September	Croatian International (cancelled): Host: Zagreb, Croatia; Venue: Dom Sportova; Level: Future Series; Prize: $500; Format: 32MS/32WS/24MD/24WD/24XD	Score:	
21 September	Croatian International (cancelled): Host: Zagreb, Croatia; Venue: Dom Sportova; Level: Future Series; Prize: $500; Format: 32MS/32WS/24MD/24WD/24XD	Score:	
28 September	Indonesia Masters Super 100 (Draw) (cancelled): Host: TBD, Indonesia; Venue: TBD; Level: Super 100; Prize: $90,000; Format: 48MS/32WS/32MD/32WD/32XD		
28 September	Indonesia Masters Super 100 (Draw) (cancelled): Host: TBD, Indonesia; Venue: TBD; Level: Super 100; Prize: $90,000; Format: 48MS/32WS/32MD/32WD/32XD	Score:	
28 September	Indonesia Masters Super 100 (Draw) (cancelled): Host: TBD, Indonesia; Venue: TBD; Level: Super 100; Prize: $90,000; Format: 48MS/32WS/32MD/32WD/32XD	Score:	
28 September	Indonesia Masters Super 100 (Draw) (cancelled): Host: TBD, Indonesia; Venue: TBD; Level: Super 100; Prize: $90,000; Format: 48MS/32WS/32MD/32WD/32XD	Score:	
28 September	Indonesia Masters Super 100 (Draw) (cancelled): Host: TBD, Indonesia; Venue: TBD; Level: Super 100; Prize: $90,000; Format: 48MS/32WS/32MD/32WD/32XD	Score:	
28 September	Indonesia Masters Super 100 (Draw) (cancelled): Host: TBD, Indonesia; Venue: TBD; Level: Super 100; Prize: $90,000; Format: 48MS/32WS/32MD/32WD/32XD	Score:	
28 September	Myanmar International Challenge (cancelled): Host: Yangon, Myanmar; Venue: TBD; Level: International Challenge; Prize: $25,000; Format: TBD		
28 September	Myanmar International Challenge (cancelled): Host: Yangon, Myanmar; Venue: TBD; Level: International Challenge; Prize: $25,000; Format: TBD	Score:	
28 September	Myanmar International Challenge (cancelled): Host: Yangon, Myanmar; Venue: TBD; Level: International Challenge; Prize: $25,000; Format: TBD	Score:	
28 September	Myanmar International Challenge (cancelled): Host: Yangon, Myanmar; Venue: TBD; Level: International Challenge; Prize: $25,000; Format: TBD	Score:	
28 September	Myanmar International Challenge (cancelled): Host: Yangon, Myanmar; Venue: TBD; Level: International Challenge; Prize: $25,000; Format: TBD	Score:	
28 September	Myanmar International Challenge (cancelled): Host: Yangon, Myanmar; Venue: TBD; Level: International Challenge; Prize: $25,000; Format: TBD	Score:	
28 September	Bahrain International Series (cancelled) (Note: Tournament cancelled or postponed due to the COVID-19 pandemic on 10 July 2020.): Host: Isa Town, Bahrain; Venue: TBD; Level: International Series; Prize: $10,000; Format: TBD		
28 September	Bahrain International Series (cancelled): Host: Isa Town, Bahrain; Venue: TBD; Level: International Series; Prize: $10,000; Format: TBD	Score:	
28 September	Bahrain International Series (cancelled): Host: Isa Town, Bahrain; Venue: TBD; Level: International Series; Prize: $10,000; Format: TBD	Score:	
28 September	Bahrain International Series (cancelled): Host: Isa Town, Bahrain; Venue: TBD; Level: International Series; Prize: $10,000; Format: TBD	Score:	
28 September	Bahrain International Series (cancelled): Host: Isa Town, Bahrain; Venue: TBD; Level: International Series; Prize: $10,000; Format: TBD	Score:	
28 September	Bahrain International Series (cancelled): Host: Isa Town, Bahrain; Venue: TBD; Level: International Series; Prize: $10,000; Format: TBD	Score:	
28 September	Bulgarian Future Series: Host: Sofia, Bulgaria; Venue: Sport Hall "Europe"; Level: Future Series; Format: 32MS/32WS/16MD/16WD/16XD	(Croatia) Luka Ban	(Bulgaria) Iliyan Stoynov
28 September	Bulgarian Future Series: Host: Sofia, Bulgaria; Venue: Sport Hall "Europe"; Level: Future Series; Format: 32MS/32WS/16MD/16WD/16XD	Score: 21–10, 21–15	
28 September	Bulgarian Future Series: Host: Sofia, Bulgaria; Venue: Sport Hall "Europe"; Level: Future Series; Format: 32MS/32WS/16MD/16WD/16XD	(Bulgaria) Linda Zetchiri	(Serbia) Marija Sudimac
28 September	Bulgarian Future Series: Host: Sofia, Bulgaria; Venue: Sport Hall "Europe"; Level: Future Series; Format: 32MS/32WS/16MD/16WD/16XD	Score: 21–7, 21–10	
28 September	Bulgarian Future Series: Host: Sofia, Bulgaria; Venue: Sport Hall "Europe"; Level: Future Series; Format: 32MS/32WS/16MD/16WD/16XD	(Bulgaria) Daniel Nikolov (Bulgaria) Ivan Rusev	(Slovenia) Miha Ivanič (Slovenia) Gasper Krivec
28 September	Bulgarian Future Series: Host: Sofia, Bulgaria; Venue: Sport Hall "Europe"; Level: Future Series; Format: 32MS/32WS/16MD/16WD/16XD	Score: 21–9, 21–14	
28 September	Bulgarian Future Series: Host: Sofia, Bulgaria; Venue: Sport Hall "Europe"; Level: Future Series; Format: 32MS/32WS/16MD/16WD/16XD	(Bulgaria) Gabriela Stoeva (Bulgaria) Stefani Stoeva	(Bulgaria) Maria Delcheva (Bulgaria) Hristomira Popovska
28 September	Bulgarian Future Series: Host: Sofia, Bulgaria; Venue: Sport Hall "Europe"; Level: Future Series; Format: 32MS/32WS/16MD/16WD/16XD	Score: 21–8, 21–9	
28 September	Bulgarian Future Series: Host: Sofia, Bulgaria; Venue: Sport Hall "Europe"; Level: Future Series; Format: 32MS/32WS/16MD/16WD/16XD	(Bulgaria) Iliyan Stoynov (Bulgaria) Hristomira Popovska	(Slovenia) Miha Ivančič (Slovenia) Petra Polanc
28 September	Bulgarian Future Series: Host: Sofia, Bulgaria; Venue: Sport Hall "Europe"; Level: Future Series; Format: 32MS/32WS/16MD/16WD/16XD	Score: Walkover	

=== October ===
Week commencing	Tournament	Champions	Runners-up
3 October	Thomas & Uber Cup (Draw) (postponed) (Note: This tournament, originally to be played from 16–24 May, was later postponed to 15–23 August due to the COVID-19 pandemic. before getting another postponement. It was later postponed to early 2021.): Host: Aarhus, Denmark; Venue: Aarhus Idrætspark; Level: World Team Championships; Format: 16MT/16WT		
3 October	Thomas & Uber Cup (Draw) (postponed): Host: Aarhus, Denmark; Venue: Aarhus Idrætspark; Level: World Team Championships; Format: 16MT/16WT	Score:	
5 October	Dutch Open (Draw) (cancelled) (Note: Tournament cancelled or postponed due to the COVID-19 pandemic on 7 July 2020.): Host: Almere, Netherlands; Venue: TBD; Level: Super 100; Prize: $90,000; Format: 48MS/32WS/32MD/32WD/32XD		
5 October	Dutch Open (Draw) (cancelled): Host: Almere, Netherlands; Venue: TBD; Level: Super 100; Prize: $90,000; Format: 48MS/32WS/32MD/32WD/32XD	Score:	
5 October	Dutch Open (Draw) (cancelled): Host: Almere, Netherlands; Venue: TBD; Level: Super 100; Prize: $90,000; Format: 48MS/32WS/32MD/32WD/32XD	Score:	
5 October	Dutch Open (Draw) (cancelled): Host: Almere, Netherlands; Venue: TBD; Level: Super 100; Prize: $90,000; Format: 48MS/32WS/32MD/32WD/32XD	Score:	
5 October	Dutch Open (Draw) (cancelled): Host: Almere, Netherlands; Venue: TBD; Level: Super 100; Prize: $90,000; Format: 48MS/32WS/32MD/32WD/32XD	Score:	
5 October	Dutch Open (Draw) (cancelled): Host: Almere, Netherlands; Venue: TBD; Level: Super 100; Prize: $90,000; Format: 48MS/32WS/32MD/32WD/32XD	Score:	
5 October	Cameroon International (cancelled) (Note: Tournament cancelled or postponed due to the COVID-19 pandemic on 7 August 2020.): Host: Yaoundé, Cameroon; Venue: TBD; Level: International Series; Prize: $10,000; Format: TBD		
5 October	Cameroon International (cancelled): Host: Yaoundé, Cameroon; Venue: TBD; Level: International Series; Prize: $10,000; Format: TBD	Score:	
5 October	Cameroon International (cancelled): Host: Yaoundé, Cameroon; Venue: TBD; Level: International Series; Prize: $10,000; Format: TBD	Score:	
5 October	Cameroon International (cancelled): Host: Yaoundé, Cameroon; Venue: TBD; Level: International Series; Prize: $10,000; Format: TBD	Score:	
5 October	Cameroon International (cancelled): Host: Yaoundé, Cameroon; Venue: TBD; Level: International Series; Prize: $10,000; Format: TBD	Score:	
5 October	Cameroon International (cancelled): Host: Yaoundé, Cameroon; Venue: TBD; Level: International Series; Prize: $10,000; Format: TBD	Score:	
5 October	Myanmar Future Series (cancelled) (Note: Update on Tournaments Grade 2, 3 and Junior cancelled due to the COVID-19 pandemic.): Host: Yangon, Myanmar; Venue: TBD; Level: Future Series; Format: TBD		
5 October	Myanmar Future Series (cancelled): Host: Yangon, Myanmar; Venue: TBD; Level: Future Series; Format: TBD	Score:	
5 October	Myanmar Future Series (cancelled): Host: Yangon, Myanmar; Venue: TBD; Level: Future Series; Format: TBD	Score:	
5 October	Myanmar Future Series (cancelled): Host: Yangon, Myanmar; Venue: TBD; Level: Future Series; Format: TBD	Score:	
5 October	Myanmar Future Series (cancelled): Host: Yangon, Myanmar; Venue: TBD; Level: Future Series; Format: TBD	Score:	
5 October	Myanmar Future Series (cancelled): Host: Yangon, Myanmar; Venue: TBD; Level: Future Series; Format: TBD	Score:	
5 October	Bahrain Future Series (cancelled) (Note: Tournament cancelled or postponed due to the COVID-19 pandemic on 10 July 2020.): Host: Manama, Bahrain; Venue: TBD; Level: Future Series; Format: TBD		
5 October	Bahrain Future Series (cancelled): Host: Manama, Bahrain; Venue: TBD; Level: Future Series; Format: TBD	Score:	
5 October	Bahrain Future Series (cancelled): Host: Manama, Bahrain; Venue: TBD; Level: Future Series; Format: TBD	Score:	
5 October	Bahrain Future Series (cancelled): Host: Manama, Bahrain; Venue: TBD; Level: Future Series; Format: TBD	Score:	
5 October	Bahrain Future Series (cancelled): Host: Manama, Bahrain; Venue: TBD; Level: Future Series; Format: TBD	Score:	
5 October	Bahrain Future Series (cancelled): Host: Manama, Bahrain; Venue: TBD; Level: Future Series; Format: TBD	Score:	
5 October	Chile International (cancelled) (Note: Tournament cancelled or postponed due to the COVID-19 pandemic on 24 July 2020.): Host: Santiago, Chile; Venue: TBD; Level: Future Series; Format: TBD		
5 October	Chile International (cancelled): Host: Santiago, Chile; Venue: TBD; Level: Future Series; Format: TBD	Score:	
5 October	Chile International (cancelled): Host: Santiago, Chile; Venue: TBD; Level: Future Series; Format: TBD	Score:	
5 October	Chile International (cancelled): Host: Santiago, Chile; Venue: TBD; Level: Future Series; Format: TBD	Score:	
5 October	Chile International (cancelled): Host: Santiago, Chile; Venue: TBD; Level: Future Series; Format: TBD	Score:	
5 October	Chile International (cancelled): Host: Santiago, Chile; Venue: TBD; Level: Future Series; Format: TBD	Score:	
5 October	Cyprus International (cancelled) (Note: Tournament cancelled or postponed due to the COVID-19 pandemic on 8 September 2020.): Host: Latsia, Cyprus; Venue: TBD; Level: Future Series; Format: TBD		
5 October	Cyprus International (cancelled): Host: Latsia, Cyprus; Venue: TBD; Level: Future Series; Format: TBD	Score:	
5 October	Cyprus International (cancelled): Host: Latsia, Cyprus; Venue: TBD; Level: Future Series; Format: TBD	Score:	
5 October	Cyprus International (cancelled): Host: Latsia, Cyprus; Venue: TBD; Level: Future Series; Format: TBD	Score:	
5 October	Cyprus International (cancelled): Host: Latsia, Cyprus; Venue: TBD; Level: Future Series; Format: TBD	Score:	
5 October	Cyprus International (cancelled): Host: Latsia, Cyprus; Venue: TBD; Level: Future Series; Format: TBD	Score:	
12 October	Denmark Open (Draw): Host: Odense, Denmark; Venue: Odense Sports Park; Level: Super 750; Prize: $750,000; Format: 32MS/32WS/32MD/32WD/32XD	(Denmark) Anders Antonsen	(Denmark) Rasmus Gemke
12 October	Denmark Open (Draw): Host: Odense, Denmark; Venue: Odense Sports Park; Level: Super 750; Prize: $750,000; Format: 32MS/32WS/32MD/32WD/32XD	Score: 18–21, 21–19, 21–12	
12 October	Denmark Open (Draw): Host: Odense, Denmark; Venue: Odense Sports Park; Level: Super 750; Prize: $750,000; Format: 32MS/32WS/32MD/32WD/32XD	(Japan) Nozomi Okuhara	(Spain) Carolina Marín
12 October	Denmark Open (Draw): Host: Odense, Denmark; Venue: Odense Sports Park; Level: Super 750; Prize: $750,000; Format: 32MS/32WS/32MD/32WD/32XD	Score: 21–19, 21–17	
12 October	Denmark Open (Draw): Host: Odense, Denmark; Venue: Odense Sports Park; Level: Super 750; Prize: $750,000; Format: 32MS/32WS/32MD/32WD/32XD	(England) Marcus Ellis (England) Chris Langridge	(Russia) Vladimir Ivanov (Russia) Ivan Sozonov
12 October	Denmark Open (Draw): Host: Odense, Denmark; Venue: Odense Sports Park; Level: Super 750; Prize: $750,000; Format: 32MS/32WS/32MD/32WD/32XD	Score: 20–22, 21–17, 21–18	
12 October	Denmark Open (Draw): Host: Odense, Denmark; Venue: Odense Sports Park; Level: Super 750; Prize: $750,000; Format: 32MS/32WS/32MD/32WD/32XD	(Japan) Yuki Fukushima (Japan) Sayaka Hirota	(Japan) Mayu Matsumoto (Japan) Wakana Nagahara
12 October	Denmark Open (Draw): Host: Odense, Denmark; Venue: Odense Sports Park; Level: Super 750; Prize: $750,000; Format: 32MS/32WS/32MD/32WD/32XD	Score: 21–10, 16–21, 21–18	
12 October	Denmark Open (Draw): Host: Odense, Denmark; Venue: Odense Sports Park; Level: Super 750; Prize: $750,000; Format: 32MS/32WS/32MD/32WD/32XD	(Germany) Mark Lamsfuß (Germany) Isabel Herttrich	(England) Chris Adcock (England) Gabby Adcock
12 October	Denmark Open (Draw): Host: Odense, Denmark; Venue: Odense Sports Park; Level: Super 750; Prize: $750,000; Format: 32MS/32WS/32MD/32WD/32XD	Score: 18–21, 21–11, 21–14	
12 October	Czech International (cancelled) (Note: Tournament cancelled on 29 June 2020.): Host: Brno, Czech Republic; Venue: TBD; Level: International Challenge; Prize: $25,000; Format: TBD		
12 October	Czech International (cancelled): Host: Brno, Czech Republic; Venue: TBD; Level: International Challenge; Prize: $25,000; Format: TBD	Score:	
12 October	Czech International (cancelled): Host: Brno, Czech Republic; Venue: TBD; Level: International Challenge; Prize: $25,000; Format: TBD	Score:	
12 October	Czech International (cancelled): Host: Brno, Czech Republic; Venue: TBD; Level: International Challenge; Prize: $25,000; Format: TBD	Score:	
12 October	Czech International (cancelled): Host: Brno, Czech Republic; Venue: TBD; Level: International Challenge; Prize: $25,000; Format: TBD	Score:	
12 October	Czech International (cancelled): Host: Brno, Czech Republic; Venue: TBD; Level: International Challenge; Prize: $25,000; Format: TBD	Score:	
12 October	Brazil International (cancelled): Host: Teresina, Brazil; Venue: TBD; Level: International Series; Prize: $10,000; Format: TBD		
12 October	Brazil International (cancelled): Host: Teresina, Brazil; Venue: TBD; Level: International Series; Prize: $10,000; Format: TBD	Score:	
12 October	Brazil International (cancelled): Host: Teresina, Brazil; Venue: TBD; Level: International Series; Prize: $10,000; Format: TBD	Score:	
12 October	Brazil International (cancelled): Host: Teresina, Brazil; Venue: TBD; Level: International Series; Prize: $10,000; Format: TBD	Score:	
12 October	Brazil International (cancelled): Host: Teresina, Brazil; Venue: TBD; Level: International Series; Prize: $10,000; Format: TBD	Score:	
12 October	Brazil International (cancelled): Host: Teresina, Brazil; Venue: TBD; Level: International Series; Prize: $10,000; Format: TBD	Score:	
12 October	Egypt International (cancelled): Host: Cairo, Egypt; Venue: TBD; Level: Future Series; Format: TBD		
12 October	Egypt International (cancelled): Host: Cairo, Egypt; Venue: TBD; Level: Future Series; Format: TBD	Score:	
12 October	Egypt International (cancelled): Host: Cairo, Egypt; Venue: TBD; Level: Future Series; Format: TBD	Score:	
12 October	Egypt International (cancelled): Host: Cairo, Egypt; Venue: TBD; Level: Future Series; Format: TBD	Score:	
12 October	Egypt International (cancelled): Host: Cairo, Egypt; Venue: TBD; Level: Future Series; Format: TBD	Score:	
12 October	Egypt International (cancelled): Host: Cairo, Egypt; Venue: TBD; Level: Future Series; Format: TBD	Score:	
19 October	French Open (Draw) (cancelled): Host: Paris, France; Venue: TBD; Level: Super 750; Prize: $750,000; Format: 32MS/32WS/32MD/32WD/32XD		
19 October	French Open (Draw) (cancelled): Host: Paris, France; Venue: TBD; Level: Super 750; Prize: $750,000; Format: 32MS/32WS/32MD/32WD/32XD	Score:	
19 October	French Open (Draw) (cancelled): Host: Paris, France; Venue: TBD; Level: Super 750; Prize: $750,000; Format: 32MS/32WS/32MD/32WD/32XD	Score:	
19 October	French Open (Draw) (cancelled): Host: Paris, France; Venue: TBD; Level: Super 750; Prize: $750,000; Format: 32MS/32WS/32MD/32WD/32XD	Score:	
19 October	French Open (Draw) (cancelled): Host: Paris, France; Venue: TBD; Level: Super 750; Prize: $750,000; Format: 32MS/32WS/32MD/32WD/32XD	Score:	
19 October	French Open (Draw) (cancelled): Host: Paris, France; Venue: TBD; Level: Super 750; Prize: $750,000; Format: 32MS/32WS/32MD/32WD/32XD	Score:	
19 October	New Zealand Open (Draw) (cancelled) (Note: This tournament, originally to be played from 28 April until 3 May, was later cancelled due to the COVID-19 pandemic in New Zealand.): Host: Auckland, New Zealand; Venue: Eventfinda Stadium; Level: Super 300; Prize: $170,000; Format: 32MS/32WS/32MD/32WD/32XD		
19 October	New Zealand Open (Draw) (cancelled): Host: Auckland, New Zealand; Venue: Eventfinda Stadium; Level: Super 300; Prize: $170,000; Format: 32MS/32WS/32MD/32WD/32XD	Score:	
19 October	New Zealand Open (Draw) (cancelled): Host: Auckland, New Zealand; Venue: Eventfinda Stadium; Level: Super 300; Prize: $170,000; Format: 32MS/32WS/32MD/32WD/32XD	Score:	
19 October	New Zealand Open (Draw) (cancelled): Host: Auckland, New Zealand; Venue: Eventfinda Stadium; Level: Super 300; Prize: $170,000; Format: 32MS/32WS/32MD/32WD/32XD	Score:	
19 October	New Zealand Open (Draw) (cancelled): Host: Auckland, New Zealand; Venue: Eventfinda Stadium; Level: Super 300; Prize: $170,000; Format: 32MS/32WS/32MD/32WD/32XD	Score:	
19 October	New Zealand Open (Draw) (cancelled): Host: Auckland, New Zealand; Venue: Eventfinda Stadium; Level: Super 300; Prize: $170,000; Format: 32MS/32WS/32MD/32WD/32XD	Score:	
19 October	Indonesia International Challenge (cancelled): Host: TBD, Indonesia; Venue: TBD; Level: International Challenge; Prize: $25,000; Format: TBD		
19 October	Indonesia International Challenge (cancelled): Host: TBD, Indonesia; Venue: TBD; Level: International Challenge; Prize: $25,000; Format: TBD	Score:	
19 October	Indonesia International Challenge (cancelled): Host: TBD, Indonesia; Venue: TBD; Level: International Challenge; Prize: $25,000; Format: TBD	Score:	
19 October	Indonesia International Challenge (cancelled): Host: TBD, Indonesia; Venue: TBD; Level: International Challenge; Prize: $25,000; Format: TBD	Score:	
19 October	Indonesia International Challenge (cancelled): Host: TBD, Indonesia; Venue: TBD; Level: International Challenge; Prize: $25,000; Format: TBD	Score:	
19 October	Indonesia International Challenge (cancelled): Host: TBD, Indonesia; Venue: TBD; Level: International Challenge; Prize: $25,000; Format: TBD	Score:	
19 October	Israel International (cancelled) (Note: This tournament, originally to be played from 21 to 24 October, was later cancelled due to the COVID-19 pandemic in Israel.): Host: Kibbutz Hatzor, Israel; Venue: TBD; Level: Future Series; Format: TBD		
19 October	Israel International (cancelled): Host: Kibbutz Hatzor, Israel; Venue: TBD; Level: Future Series; Format: TBD	Score:	
19 October	Israel International (cancelled): Host: Kibbutz Hatzor, Israel; Venue: TBD; Level: Future Series; Format: TBD	Score:	
19 October	Israel International (cancelled): Host: Kibbutz Hatzor, Israel; Venue: TBD; Level: Future Series; Format: TBD	Score:	
19 October	Israel International (cancelled): Host: Kibbutz Hatzor, Israel; Venue: TBD; Level: Future Series; Format: TBD	Score:	
19 October	Israel International (cancelled): Host: Kibbutz Hatzor, Israel; Venue: TBD; Level: Future Series; Format: TBD	Score:	
19 October	Algeria International (cancelled) (Note: Tournament cancelled or postponed due to the COVID-19 pandemic on 18 September 2020.): Host: Algiers, Algeria; Venue: TBD; Level: Future Series; Format: TBD		
19 October	Algeria International (cancelled): Host: Algiers, Algeria; Venue: TBD; Level: Future Series; Format: TBD	Score:	
19 October	Algeria International (cancelled): Host: Algiers, Algeria; Venue: TBD; Level: Future Series; Format: TBD	Score:	
19 October	Algeria International (cancelled): Host: Algiers, Algeria; Venue: TBD; Level: Future Series; Format: TBD	Score:	
19 October	Algeria International (cancelled): Host: Algiers, Algeria; Venue: TBD; Level: Future Series; Format: TBD	Score:	
19 October	Algeria International (cancelled): Host: Algiers, Algeria; Venue: TBD; Level: Future Series; Format: TBD	Score:	
26 October	Macau Open (Draw) (cancelled): Host: Macau; Venue: TBD; Level: Super 300; Prize: $170,000; Format: 32MS/32WS/32MD/32WD/32XD		
26 October	Macau Open (Draw) (cancelled): Host: Macau; Venue: TBD; Level: Super 300; Prize: $170,000; Format: 32MS/32WS/32MD/32WD/32XD	Score:	
26 October	Macau Open (Draw) (cancelled): Host: Macau; Venue: TBD; Level: Super 300; Prize: $170,000; Format: 32MS/32WS/32MD/32WD/32XD	Score:	
26 October	Macau Open (Draw) (cancelled): Host: Macau; Venue: TBD; Level: Super 300; Prize: $170,000; Format: 32MS/32WS/32MD/32WD/32XD	Score:	
26 October	Macau Open (Draw) (cancelled): Host: Macau; Venue: TBD; Level: Super 300; Prize: $170,000; Format: 32MS/32WS/32MD/32WD/32XD	Score:	
26 October	Macau Open (Draw) (cancelled): Host: Macau; Venue: TBD; Level: Super 300; Prize: $170,000; Format: 32MS/32WS/32MD/32WD/32XD	Score:	
26 October	SaarLorLux Open (Draw): Host: Saarbrücken, Germany; Venue: Saarlandhalle; Level: Super 100; Prize: $90,000; Format: 64MS/32WS/32MD/32WD/32XD	(France) Toma Junior Popov	(Netherlands) Mark Caljouw
26 October	SaarLorLux Open (Draw): Host: Saarbrücken, Germany; Venue: Saarlandhalle; Level: Super 100; Prize: $90,000; Format: 64MS/32WS/32MD/32WD/32XD	Score: 22–20, 19–21, 21–14	
26 October	SaarLorLux Open (Draw): Host: Saarbrücken, Germany; Venue: Saarlandhalle; Level: Super 100; Prize: $90,000; Format: 64MS/32WS/32MD/32WD/32XD	(Scotland) Kirsty Gilmour	(Germany) Yvonne Li
26 October	SaarLorLux Open (Draw): Host: Saarbrücken, Germany; Venue: Saarlandhalle; Level: Super 100; Prize: $90,000; Format: 64MS/32WS/32MD/32WD/32XD	Score: 21–10, 21–17	
26 October	SaarLorLux Open (Draw): Host: Saarbrücken, Germany; Venue: Saarlandhalle; Level: Super 100; Prize: $90,000; Format: 64MS/32WS/32MD/32WD/32XD	(Denmark) Jeppe Bay (Denmark) Lasse Mølhede	(Denmark) Daniel Lundgaard (Denmark) Mathias Thyrri
26 October	SaarLorLux Open (Draw): Host: Saarbrücken, Germany; Venue: Saarlandhalle; Level: Super 100; Prize: $90,000; Format: 64MS/32WS/32MD/32WD/32XD	Score: 21–13, 21–15	
26 October	SaarLorLux Open (Draw): Host: Saarbrücken, Germany; Venue: Saarlandhalle; Level: Super 100; Prize: $90,000; Format: 64MS/32WS/32MD/32WD/32XD	(Bulgaria) Gabriela Stoeva (Bulgaria) Stefani Stoeva	(Denmark) Amalie Magelund (Denmark) Freja Ravn
26 October	SaarLorLux Open (Draw): Host: Saarbrücken, Germany; Venue: Saarlandhalle; Level: Super 100; Prize: $90,000; Format: 64MS/32WS/32MD/32WD/32XD	Score: 21–8, 21–11	
26 October	SaarLorLux Open (Draw): Host: Saarbrücken, Germany; Venue: Saarlandhalle; Level: Super 100; Prize: $90,000; Format: 64MS/32WS/32MD/32WD/32XD	(Denmark) Mathias Christiansen (Denmark) Alexandra Bøje	(Germany) Mark Lamsfuß (Germany) Isabel Herttrich
26 October	SaarLorLux Open (Draw): Host: Saarbrücken, Germany; Venue: Saarlandhalle; Level: Super 100; Prize: $90,000; Format: 64MS/32WS/32MD/32WD/32XD	Score: 21–15, 19–21, 21–11	
26 October	Vietnam International Challenge (cancelled) (Note: This tournament, originally to be played from 24 to 29 March, was later postponed to 2–7 June due to the COVID-19 pandemic in Vietnam before getting another schedule. It was officially cancelled on 10 July 2020.): Host: Hanoi, Vietnam; Venue: Tay Ho District Stadium; Level: International Challenge; Prize: $25,000; Format: TBD		
26 October	Vietnam International Challenge (cancelled): Host: Hanoi, Vietnam; Venue: Tay Ho District Stadium; Level: International Challenge; Prize: $25,000; Format: TBD	Score:	
26 October	Vietnam International Challenge (cancelled): Host: Hanoi, Vietnam; Venue: Tay Ho District Stadium; Level: International Challenge; Prize: $25,000; Format: TBD	Score:	
26 October	Vietnam International Challenge (cancelled): Host: Hanoi, Vietnam; Venue: Tay Ho District Stadium; Level: International Challenge; Prize: $25,000; Format: TBD	Score:	
26 October	Vietnam International Challenge (cancelled): Host: Hanoi, Vietnam; Venue: Tay Ho District Stadium; Level: International Challenge; Prize: $25,000; Format: TBD	Score:	
26 October	Vietnam International Challenge (cancelled): Host: Hanoi, Vietnam; Venue: Tay Ho District Stadium; Level: International Challenge; Prize: $25,000; Format: TBD	Score:	
26 October	Hungarian International (cancelled) (Note: Tournament cancelled or postponed due to the COVID-19 pandemic on 11 September 2020.): Host: Budaors, Hungary; Venue: TBD; Level: International Challenge; Prize: $25,000; Format: TBD		
26 October	Hungarian International (cancelled): Host: Budaors, Hungary; Venue: TBD; Level: International Challenge; Prize: $25,000; Format: TBD	Score:	
26 October	Hungarian International (cancelled): Host: Budaors, Hungary; Venue: TBD; Level: International Challenge; Prize: $25,000; Format: TBD	Score:	
26 October	Hungarian International (cancelled): Host: Budaors, Hungary; Venue: TBD; Level: International Challenge; Prize: $25,000; Format: TBD	Score:	
26 October	Hungarian International (cancelled): Host: Budaors, Hungary; Venue: TBD; Level: International Challenge; Prize: $25,000; Format: TBD	Score:	
26 October	Hungarian International (cancelled): Host: Budaors, Hungary; Venue: TBD; Level: International Challenge; Prize: $25,000; Format: TBD	Score:	
26 October	Santo Domingo Open (cancelled) (Note: Two Pan Am Tournaments Cancelled in October due to the COVID-19 pandemic in the Dominican Republic.): Host: Santo Domingo, Dominican Republic; Venue: TBD; Level: International Series; Prize: $10,000; Format: TBD		
26 October	Santo Domingo Open (cancelled): Host: Santo Domingo, Dominican Republic; Venue: TBD; Level: International Series; Prize: $10,000; Format: TBD	Score:	
26 October	Santo Domingo Open (cancelled): Host: Santo Domingo, Dominican Republic; Venue: TBD; Level: International Series; Prize: $10,000; Format: TBD	Score:	
26 October	Santo Domingo Open (cancelled): Host: Santo Domingo, Dominican Republic; Venue: TBD; Level: International Series; Prize: $10,000; Format: TBD	Score:	
26 October	Santo Domingo Open (cancelled): Host: Santo Domingo, Dominican Republic; Venue: TBD; Level: International Series; Prize: $10,000; Format: TBD	Score:	
26 October	Santo Domingo Open (cancelled): Host: Santo Domingo, Dominican Republic; Venue: TBD; Level: International Series; Prize: $10,000; Format: TBD	Score:	

=== November ===
Week commencing	Tournament	Champions	Runners-up
2 November	Fuzhou China Open (Draw) (cancelled): Host: Fuzhou, China; Venue: TBD; Level: Super 750; Prize: $750,000; Format: 32MS/32WS/32MD/32WD/32XD		
2 November	Fuzhou China Open (Draw) (cancelled): Host: Fuzhou, China; Venue: TBD; Level: Super 750; Prize: $750,000; Format: 32MS/32WS/32MD/32WD/32XD	Score:	
2 November	Fuzhou China Open (Draw) (cancelled): Host: Fuzhou, China; Venue: TBD; Level: Super 750; Prize: $750,000; Format: 32MS/32WS/32MD/32WD/32XD	Score:	
2 November	Fuzhou China Open (Draw) (cancelled): Host: Fuzhou, China; Venue: TBD; Level: Super 750; Prize: $750,000; Format: 32MS/32WS/32MD/32WD/32XD	Score:	
2 November	Fuzhou China Open (Draw) (cancelled): Host: Fuzhou, China; Venue: TBD; Level: Super 750; Prize: $750,000; Format: 32MS/32WS/32MD/32WD/32XD	Score:	
2 November	Fuzhou China Open (Draw) (cancelled): Host: Fuzhou, China; Venue: TBD; Level: Super 750; Prize: $750,000; Format: 32MS/32WS/32MD/32WD/32XD	Score:	
2 November	Malaysia International Challenge (cancelled) (Note: Tournament cancelled or postponed due to the COVID-19 pandemic on 11 September 2020.): Host: Ipoh, Malaysia; Venue: TBD; Level: International Challenge; Prize: $25,000; Format: TBD		
2 November	Malaysia International Challenge (cancelled): Host: Ipoh, Malaysia; Venue: TBD; Level: International Challenge; Prize: $25,000; Format: TBD	Score:	
2 November	Malaysia International Challenge (cancelled): Host: Ipoh, Malaysia; Venue: TBD; Level: International Challenge; Prize: $25,000; Format: TBD	Score:	
2 November	Malaysia International Challenge (cancelled): Host: Ipoh, Malaysia; Venue: TBD; Level: International Challenge; Prize: $25,000; Format: TBD	Score:	
2 November	Malaysia International Challenge (cancelled): Host: Ipoh, Malaysia; Venue: TBD; Level: International Challenge; Prize: $25,000; Format: TBD	Score:	
2 November	Malaysia International Challenge (cancelled): Host: Ipoh, Malaysia; Venue: TBD; Level: International Challenge; Prize: $25,000; Format: TBD	Score:	
2 November	Kazakhstan International (cancelled) (Note: Tournament cancelled or postponed due to the COVID-19 pandemic on 10 July 2020.): Host: Uralsk, Kazakhstan; Venue: TBD; Level: International Series; Prize: $10,000; Format: TBD		
2 November	Kazakhstan International (cancelled): Host: Uralsk, Kazakhstan; Venue: TBD; Level: International Series; Prize: $10,000; Format: TBD	Score:	
2 November	Kazakhstan International (cancelled): Host: Uralsk, Kazakhstan; Venue: TBD; Level: International Series; Prize: $10,000; Format: TBD	Score:	
2 November	Kazakhstan International (cancelled): Host: Uralsk, Kazakhstan; Venue: TBD; Level: International Series; Prize: $10,000; Format: TBD	Score:	
2 November	Kazakhstan International (cancelled): Host: Uralsk, Kazakhstan; Venue: TBD; Level: International Series; Prize: $10,000; Format: TBD	Score:	
2 November	Kazakhstan International (cancelled): Host: Uralsk, Kazakhstan; Venue: TBD; Level: International Series; Prize: $10,000; Format: TBD	Score:	
2 November	Norwegian International (cancelled): Host: Sandefjord, Norway; Venue: TBD; Level: International Series; Prize: $10,000; Format: TBD		
2 November	Norwegian International (cancelled): Host: Sandefjord, Norway; Venue: TBD; Level: International Series; Prize: $10,000; Format: TBD	Score:	
2 November	Norwegian International (cancelled): Host: Sandefjord, Norway; Venue: TBD; Level: International Series; Prize: $10,000; Format: TBD	Score:	
2 November	Norwegian International (cancelled): Host: Sandefjord, Norway; Venue: TBD; Level: International Series; Prize: $10,000; Format: TBD	Score:	
2 November	Norwegian International (cancelled): Host: Sandefjord, Norway; Venue: TBD; Level: International Series; Prize: $10,000; Format: TBD	Score:	
2 November	Norwegian International (cancelled): Host: Sandefjord, Norway; Venue: TBD; Level: International Series; Prize: $10,000; Format: TBD	Score:	
2 November	Guatemala Future Series (cancelled) (Note: Tournament cancelled or postponed due to the COVID-19 pandemic on 25 August 2020.): Host: Guatemala City, Guatemala; Venue: TBD; Level: Future Series; Format: TBD		
2 November	Guatemala Future Series (cancelled): Host: Guatemala City, Guatemala; Venue: TBD; Level: Future Series; Format: TBD	Score:	
2 November	Guatemala Future Series (cancelled): Host: Guatemala City, Guatemala; Venue: TBD; Level: Future Series; Format: TBD	Score:	
2 November	Guatemala Future Series (cancelled): Host: Guatemala City, Guatemala; Venue: TBD; Level: Future Series; Format: TBD	Score:	
2 November	Guatemala Future Series (cancelled): Host: Guatemala City, Guatemala; Venue: TBD; Level: Future Series; Format: TBD	Score:	
2 November	Guatemala Future Series (cancelled): Host: Guatemala City, Guatemala; Venue: TBD; Level: Future Series; Format: TBD	Score:	
2 November	Portugal International: Host: Caldas da Rainha, Portugal; Venue: Badminton High Performance Sports Centre; Level: International Series; Prize: $10,000; Format: 32MS/32WS/32MD/16WD/32XD	(France) Brice Leverdez	(France) Lucas Corvée
2 November	Portugal International: Host: Caldas da Rainha, Portugal; Venue: Badminton High Performance Sports Centre; Level: International Series; Prize: $10,000; Format: 32MS/32WS/32MD/16WD/32XD	Score: 21–10, 21–12	
2 November	Portugal International: Host: Caldas da Rainha, Portugal; Venue: Badminton High Performance Sports Centre; Level: International Series; Prize: $10,000; Format: 32MS/32WS/32MD/16WD/32XD	(Switzerland) Sabrina Jaquet	(France) Léonice Huet
2 November	Portugal International: Host: Caldas da Rainha, Portugal; Venue: Badminton High Performance Sports Centre; Level: International Series; Prize: $10,000; Format: 32MS/32WS/32MD/16WD/32XD	Score: 21–10, 21–11	
2 November	Portugal International: Host: Caldas da Rainha, Portugal; Venue: Badminton High Performance Sports Centre; Level: International Series; Prize: $10,000; Format: 32MS/32WS/32MD/16WD/32XD	(France) Lucas Corvée (France) Brice Leverdez	(Scotland) Christopher Grimley (Scotland) Matthew Grimley
2 November	Portugal International: Host: Caldas da Rainha, Portugal; Venue: Badminton High Performance Sports Centre; Level: International Series; Prize: $10,000; Format: 32MS/32WS/32MD/16WD/32XD	Score: 26–24, 24–22	
2 November	Portugal International: Host: Caldas da Rainha, Portugal; Venue: Badminton High Performance Sports Centre; Level: International Series; Prize: $10,000; Format: 32MS/32WS/32MD/16WD/32XD	(Scotland) Lauren Middleton (Scotland) Holly Newall	(Republic of Ireland) Sara Boyle (Republic of Ireland) Rachael Darragh
2 November	Portugal International: Host: Caldas da Rainha, Portugal; Venue: Badminton High Performance Sports Centre; Level: International Series; Prize: $10,000; Format: 32MS/32WS/32MD/16WD/32XD	Score: 22–20, 25–23	
2 November	Portugal International: Host: Caldas da Rainha, Portugal; Venue: Badminton High Performance Sports Centre; Level: International Series; Prize: $10,000; Format: 32MS/32WS/32MD/16WD/32XD	(Scotland) Christopher Grimley (Scotland) Eleanor O'Donnell	(Scotland) Adam Pringle (Scotland) Rachel Andrew
2 November	Portugal International: Host: Caldas da Rainha, Portugal; Venue: Badminton High Performance Sports Centre; Level: International Series; Prize: $10,000; Format: 32MS/32WS/32MD/16WD/32XD	Score: 21–18, 21–6	
9 November	Hong Kong Open (Draw) (cancelled): Host: Hong Kong; Venue: TBD; Level: Super 500; Prize: $400,000; Format: 32MS/32WS/32MD/32WD/32XD		
9 November	Hong Kong Open (Draw) (cancelled): Host: Hong Kong; Venue: TBD; Level: Super 500; Prize: $400,000; Format: 32MS/32WS/32MD/32WD/32XD	Score:	
9 November	Hong Kong Open (Draw) (cancelled): Host: Hong Kong; Venue: TBD; Level: Super 500; Prize: $400,000; Format: 32MS/32WS/32MD/32WD/32XD	Score:	
9 November	Hong Kong Open (Draw) (cancelled): Host: Hong Kong; Venue: TBD; Level: Super 500; Prize: $400,000; Format: 32MS/32WS/32MD/32WD/32XD	Score:	
9 November	Hong Kong Open (Draw) (cancelled): Host: Hong Kong; Venue: TBD; Level: Super 500; Prize: $400,000; Format: 32MS/32WS/32MD/32WD/32XD	Score:	
9 November	Hong Kong Open (Draw) (cancelled): Host: Hong Kong; Venue: TBD; Level: Super 500; Prize: $400,000; Format: 32MS/32WS/32MD/32WD/32XD	Score:	
9 November	India International Challenge (cancelled) (Note: Tournament cancelled or postponed due to the COVID-19 pandemic on 8 September 2020.): Host: Mumbai, India; Venue: TBD; Level: International Challenge; Prize: $25,000; Format: TBD		
9 November	India International Challenge (cancelled): Host: Mumbai, India; Venue: TBD; Level: International Challenge; Prize: $25,000; Format: TBD	Score:	
9 November	India International Challenge (cancelled): Host: Mumbai, India; Venue: TBD; Level: International Challenge; Prize: $25,000; Format: TBD	Score:	
9 November	India International Challenge (cancelled): Host: Mumbai, India; Venue: TBD; Level: International Challenge; Prize: $25,000; Format: TBD	Score:	
9 November	India International Challenge (cancelled): Host: Mumbai, India; Venue: TBD; Level: International Challenge; Prize: $25,000; Format: TBD	Score:	
9 November	India International Challenge (cancelled): Host: Mumbai, India; Venue: TBD; Level: International Challenge; Prize: $25,000; Format: TBD	Score:	
9 November	Suriname International (cancelled): Host: Paramaribo, Suriname; Venue: TBD; Level: International Series; Prize: $10,000; Format: TBD		
9 November	Suriname International (cancelled): Host: Paramaribo, Suriname; Venue: TBD; Level: International Series; Prize: $10,000; Format: TBD	Score:	
9 November	Suriname International (cancelled): Host: Paramaribo, Suriname; Venue: TBD; Level: International Series; Prize: $10,000; Format: TBD	Score:	
9 November	Suriname International (cancelled): Host: Paramaribo, Suriname; Venue: TBD; Level: International Series; Prize: $10,000; Format: TBD	Score:	
9 November	Suriname International (cancelled): Host: Paramaribo, Suriname; Venue: TBD; Level: International Series; Prize: $10,000; Format: TBD	Score:	
9 November	Suriname International (cancelled): Host: Paramaribo, Suriname; Venue: TBD; Level: International Series; Prize: $10,000; Format: TBD	Score:	
9 November	Irish Open (cancelled) (Note: Tournament cancelled due to the COVID-19 pandemic on 18 September 2020.): Host: Dublin, Ireland; Venue: TBD; Level: International Series; Prize: $10,000; Format: TBD		
9 November	Irish Open (cancelled): Host: Dublin, Ireland; Venue: TBD; Level: International Series; Prize: $10,000; Format: TBD	Score:	
9 November	Irish Open (cancelled): Host: Dublin, Ireland; Venue: TBD; Level: International Series; Prize: $10,000; Format: TBD	Score:	
9 November	Irish Open (cancelled): Host: Dublin, Ireland; Venue: TBD; Level: International Series; Prize: $10,000; Format: TBD	Score:	
9 November	Irish Open (cancelled): Host: Dublin, Ireland; Venue: TBD; Level: International Series; Prize: $10,000; Format: TBD	Score:	
9 November	Irish Open (cancelled): Host: Dublin, Ireland; Venue: TBD; Level: International Series; Prize: $10,000; Format: TBD	Score:	
16 November	Indonesia Open (Draw) (cancelled): Host: Jakarta, Indonesia; Venue: TBD; Level: Super 1000; Prize: $1,350,000; Format: 32MS/32WS/32MD/32WD/32XD		
16 November	Indonesia Open (Draw) (cancelled): Host: Jakarta, Indonesia; Venue: TBD; Level: Super 1000; Prize: $1,350,000; Format: 32MS/32WS/32MD/32WD/32XD	Score:	
16 November	Indonesia Open (Draw) (cancelled): Host: Jakarta, Indonesia; Venue: TBD; Level: Super 1000; Prize: $1,350,000; Format: 32MS/32WS/32MD/32WD/32XD	Score:	
16 November	Indonesia Open (Draw) (cancelled): Host: Jakarta, Indonesia; Venue: TBD; Level: Super 1000; Prize: $1,350,000; Format: 32MS/32WS/32MD/32WD/32XD	Score:	
16 November	Indonesia Open (Draw) (cancelled): Host: Jakarta, Indonesia; Venue: TBD; Level: Super 1000; Prize: $1,350,000; Format: 32MS/32WS/32MD/32WD/32XD	Score:	
16 November	Indonesia Open (Draw) (cancelled): Host: Jakarta, Indonesia; Venue: TBD; Level: Super 1000; Prize: $1,350,000; Format: 32MS/32WS/32MD/32WD/32XD	Score:	
16 November	Syed Modi International (Draw) (cancelled): Host: Lucknow, India; Venue: TBD; Level: Super 300; Prize: $170,000; Format: 32MS/32WS/32MD/32WD/32XD		
16 November	Syed Modi International (Draw) (cancelled): Host: Lucknow, India; Venue: TBD; Level: Super 300; Prize: $170,000; Format: 32MS/32WS/32MD/32WD/32XD	Score:	
16 November	Syed Modi International (Draw) (cancelled): Host: Lucknow, India; Venue: TBD; Level: Super 300; Prize: $170,000; Format: 32MS/32WS/32MD/32WD/32XD	Score:	
16 November	Syed Modi International (Draw) (cancelled): Host: Lucknow, India; Venue: TBD; Level: Super 300; Prize: $170,000; Format: 32MS/32WS/32MD/32WD/32XD	Score:	
16 November	Syed Modi International (Draw) (cancelled): Host: Lucknow, India; Venue: TBD; Level: Super 300; Prize: $170,000; Format: 32MS/32WS/32MD/32WD/32XD	Score:	
16 November	Syed Modi International (Draw) (cancelled): Host: Lucknow, India; Venue: TBD; Level: Super 300; Prize: $170,000; Format: 32MS/32WS/32MD/32WD/32XD	Score:	
16 November	Scottish Open (cancelled) (Note: Tournament cancelled due to the COVID-19 pandemic on 7 August 2020.): Host: Glasgow, Scotland; Venue: TBD; Level: International Challenge; Prize: $25,000; Format: TBD		
16 November	Scottish Open (cancelled): Host: Glasgow, Scotland; Venue: TBD; Level: International Challenge; Prize: $25,000; Format: TBD	Score:	
16 November	Scottish Open (cancelled): Host: Glasgow, Scotland; Venue: TBD; Level: International Challenge; Prize: $25,000; Format: TBD	Score:	
16 November	Scottish Open (cancelled): Host: Glasgow, Scotland; Venue: TBD; Level: International Challenge; Prize: $25,000; Format: TBD	Score:	
16 November	Scottish Open (cancelled): Host: Glasgow, Scotland; Venue: TBD; Level: International Challenge; Prize: $25,000; Format: TBD	Score:	
16 November	Scottish Open (cancelled): Host: Glasgow, Scotland; Venue: TBD; Level: International Challenge; Prize: $25,000; Format: TBD	Score:	
16 November	Slovenia Future Series (cancelled) (Note: Tournament cancelled or postponed due to the COVID-19 pandemic on 27 October 2020.): Host: Brežice, Slovenia; Venue: TBD; Level: Future Series; Format: TBD		
16 November	Slovenia Future Series (cancelled): Host: Brežice, Slovenia; Venue: TBD; Level: Future Series; Format: TBD	Score:	
16 November	Slovenia Future Series (cancelled): Host: Brežice, Slovenia; Venue: TBD; Level: Future Series; Format: TBD	Score:	
16 November	Slovenia Future Series (cancelled): Host: Brežice, Slovenia; Venue: TBD; Level: Future Series; Format: TBD	Score:	
16 November	Slovenia Future Series (cancelled): Host: Brežice, Slovenia; Venue: TBD; Level: Future Series; Format: TBD	Score:	
16 November	Slovenia Future Series (cancelled): Host: Brežice, Slovenia; Venue: TBD; Level: Future Series; Format: TBD	Score:	
16 November	Botswana International (cancelled): Host: Gaborone, Botswana; Venue: TBD; Level: Future Series; Format: TBD		
16 November	Botswana International (cancelled): Host: Gaborone, Botswana; Venue: TBD; Level: Future Series; Format: TBD	Score:	
16 November	Botswana International (cancelled): Host: Gaborone, Botswana; Venue: TBD; Level: Future Series; Format: TBD	Score:	
16 November	Botswana International (cancelled): Host: Gaborone, Botswana; Venue: TBD; Level: Future Series; Format: TBD	Score:	
16 November	Botswana International (cancelled): Host: Gaborone, Botswana; Venue: TBD; Level: Future Series; Format: TBD	Score:	
16 November	Botswana International (cancelled): Host: Gaborone, Botswana; Venue: TBD; Level: Future Series; Format: TBD	Score:	
16 November	Costa Rica Future Series (cancelled): Host: Cartago, Costa Rica; Venue: TBD; Level: Future Series; Format: TBD		
16 November	Costa Rica Future Series (cancelled): Host: Cartago, Costa Rica; Venue: TBD; Level: Future Series; Format: TBD	Score:	
16 November	Costa Rica Future Series (cancelled): Host: Cartago, Costa Rica; Venue: TBD; Level: Future Series; Format: TBD	Score:	
16 November	Costa Rica Future Series (cancelled): Host: Cartago, Costa Rica; Venue: TBD; Level: Future Series; Format: TBD	Score:	
16 November	Costa Rica Future Series (cancelled): Host: Cartago, Costa Rica; Venue: TBD; Level: Future Series; Format: TBD	Score:	
16 November	Costa Rica Future Series (cancelled): Host: Cartago, Costa Rica; Venue: TBD; Level: Future Series; Format: TBD	Score:	
16 November	International Mexicano: Host: Aguascalientes, Mexico; Venue: Gimnasio Olímpico; Level: International Series; Prize: $10,000; Format: 32MS/16WS/16MD/8WD/32XD	(Mexico) Job Castillo	(United States) Howard Shu
16 November	International Mexicano: Host: Aguascalientes, Mexico; Venue: Gimnasio Olímpico; Level: International Series; Prize: $10,000; Format: 32MS/16WS/16MD/8WD/32XD	Score: 21–7, 15–21, 21–11	
16 November	International Mexicano: Host: Aguascalientes, Mexico; Venue: Gimnasio Olímpico; Level: International Series; Prize: $10,000; Format: 32MS/16WS/16MD/8WD/32XD	(Mexico) Sabrina Solis	(Peru) Inés Castillo
16 November	International Mexicano: Host: Aguascalientes, Mexico; Venue: Gimnasio Olímpico; Level: International Series; Prize: $10,000; Format: 32MS/16WS/16MD/8WD/32XD	Score: 22–20, 21–8	
16 November	International Mexicano: Host: Aguascalientes, Mexico; Venue: Gimnasio Olímpico; Level: International Series; Prize: $10,000; Format: 32MS/16WS/16MD/8WD/32XD	(Mexico) Job Castillo (Mexico) Sebastián Martínez	(Peru) José Guevara (Peru) Bryan Roque
16 November	International Mexicano: Host: Aguascalientes, Mexico; Venue: Gimnasio Olímpico; Level: International Series; Prize: $10,000; Format: 32MS/16WS/16MD/8WD/32XD	Score: 21–14, 21–6	
16 November	International Mexicano: Host: Aguascalientes, Mexico; Venue: Gimnasio Olímpico; Level: International Series; Prize: $10,000; Format: 32MS/16WS/16MD/8WD/32XD	(Mexico) Jessica Bautista (Mexico) Vanessa Villalobos	(Mexico) Romina Fregoso (Mexico) Miriam Rodríguez
16 November	International Mexicano: Host: Aguascalientes, Mexico; Venue: Gimnasio Olímpico; Level: International Series; Prize: $10,000; Format: 32MS/16WS/16MD/8WD/32XD	Score: 21–10, 21–17	
16 November	International Mexicano: Host: Aguascalientes, Mexico; Venue: Gimnasio Olímpico; Level: International Series; Prize: $10,000; Format: 32MS/16WS/16MD/8WD/32XD	(Mexico) Andrés López (Mexico) Sabrina Solis	(Mexico) Job Castillo (Mexico) Vanessa Villalobos
16 November	International Mexicano: Host: Aguascalientes, Mexico; Venue: Gimnasio Olímpico; Level: International Series; Prize: $10,000; Format: 32MS/16WS/16MD/8WD/32XD	Score: 21–15, 18–21, 21–19	
23 November	Malaysia Open (Draw) (cancelled): Host: Kuala Lumpur, Malaysia; Venue: Axiata Arena; Level: Super 750; Prize: $750,000; Format: 32MS/32WS/32MD/32WD/32XD		
23 November	Malaysia Open (Draw) (cancelled): Host: Kuala Lumpur, Malaysia; Venue: Axiata Arena; Level: Super 750; Prize: $750,000; Format: 32MS/32WS/32MD/32WD/32XD	Score:	
23 November	Malaysia Open (Draw) (cancelled): Host: Kuala Lumpur, Malaysia; Venue: Axiata Arena; Level: Super 750; Prize: $750,000; Format: 32MS/32WS/32MD/32WD/32XD	Score:	
23 November	Malaysia Open (Draw) (cancelled): Host: Kuala Lumpur, Malaysia; Venue: Axiata Arena; Level: Super 750; Prize: $750,000; Format: 32MS/32WS/32MD/32WD/32XD	Score:	
23 November	Malaysia Open (Draw) (cancelled): Host: Kuala Lumpur, Malaysia; Venue: Axiata Arena; Level: Super 750; Prize: $750,000; Format: 32MS/32WS/32MD/32WD/32XD	Score:	
23 November	Malaysia Open (Draw) (cancelled): Host: Kuala Lumpur, Malaysia; Venue: Axiata Arena; Level: Super 750; Prize: $750,000; Format: 32MS/32WS/32MD/32WD/32XD	Score:	
23 November	Korea Masters (Draw) (canceled) (Note: Update on Tournaments Grade 2, 3 and Junior cancelled due to the COVID-19 pandemic.): Host: Gwangju, South Korea; Venue: TBD; Level: Super 300; Prize: $200,000; Format: 32MS/32WS/32MD/32WD/32XD		
23 November	Korea Masters (Draw) (canceled): Host: Gwangju, South Korea; Venue: TBD; Level: Super 300; Prize: $200,000; Format: 32MS/32WS/32MD/32WD/32XD	Score:	
23 November	Korea Masters (Draw) (canceled): Host: Gwangju, South Korea; Venue: TBD; Level: Super 300; Prize: $200,000; Format: 32MS/32WS/32MD/32WD/32XD	Score:	
23 November	Korea Masters (Draw) (canceled): Host: Gwangju, South Korea; Venue: TBD; Level: Super 300; Prize: $200,000; Format: 32MS/32WS/32MD/32WD/32XD	Score:	
23 November	Korea Masters (Draw) (canceled): Host: Gwangju, South Korea; Venue: TBD; Level: Super 300; Prize: $200,000; Format: 32MS/32WS/32MD/32WD/32XD	Score:	
23 November	Korea Masters (Draw) (canceled): Host: Gwangju, South Korea; Venue: TBD; Level: Super 300; Prize: $200,000; Format: 32MS/32WS/32MD/32WD/32XD	Score:	
23 November	Bangladesh International (cancelled): Host: Dhaka, Bangladesh; Venue: TBD; Level: International Challenge; Prize: $25,000; Format: TBD		
23 November	Bangladesh International (cancelled): Host: Dhaka, Bangladesh; Venue: TBD; Level: International Challenge; Prize: $25,000; Format: TBD	Score:	
23 November	Bangladesh International (cancelled): Host: Dhaka, Bangladesh; Venue: TBD; Level: International Challenge; Prize: $25,000; Format: TBD	Score:	
23 November	Bangladesh International (cancelled): Host: Dhaka, Bangladesh; Venue: TBD; Level: International Challenge; Prize: $25,000; Format: TBD	Score:	
23 November	Bangladesh International (cancelled): Host: Dhaka, Bangladesh; Venue: TBD; Level: International Challenge; Prize: $25,000; Format: TBD	Score:	
23 November	Bangladesh International (cancelled): Host: Dhaka, Bangladesh; Venue: TBD; Level: International Challenge; Prize: $25,000; Format: TBD	Score:	
23 November	White Nights (cancelled): Host: Gatchina, Russia; Venue: TBD; Level: International Challenge; Prize: $25,000; Format: TBD		
23 November	White Nights (cancelled): Host: Gatchina, Russia; Venue: TBD; Level: International Challenge; Prize: $25,000; Format: TBD	Score:	
23 November	White Nights (cancelled): Host: Gatchina, Russia; Venue: TBD; Level: International Challenge; Prize: $25,000; Format: TBD	Score:	
23 November	White Nights (cancelled): Host: Gatchina, Russia; Venue: TBD; Level: International Challenge; Prize: $25,000; Format: TBD	Score:	
23 November	White Nights (cancelled): Host: Gatchina, Russia; Venue: TBD; Level: International Challenge; Prize: $25,000; Format: TBD	Score:	
23 November	White Nights (cancelled): Host: Gatchina, Russia; Venue: TBD; Level: International Challenge; Prize: $25,000; Format: TBD	Score:	
23 November	Welsh International (cancelled): Host: Cardiff, Wales; Venue: TBD; Level: International Series; Prize: $10,000; Format: TBD		
23 November	Welsh International (cancelled): Host: Cardiff, Wales; Venue: TBD; Level: International Series; Prize: $10,000; Format: TBD	Score:	
23 November	Welsh International (cancelled): Host: Cardiff, Wales; Venue: TBD; Level: International Series; Prize: $10,000; Format: TBD	Score:	
23 November	Welsh International (cancelled): Host: Cardiff, Wales; Venue: TBD; Level: International Series; Prize: $10,000; Format: TBD	Score:	
23 November	Welsh International (cancelled): Host: Cardiff, Wales; Venue: TBD; Level: International Series; Prize: $10,000; Format: TBD	Score:	
23 November	Welsh International (cancelled): Host: Cardiff, Wales; Venue: TBD; Level: International Series; Prize: $10,000; Format: TBD	Score:	
23 November	Zambia International (cancelled) (Note: Tournament cancelled due to the COVID-19 pandemic on 24 July 2020.): Host: Lusaka, Zambia; Venue: TBD; Level: Future Series; Format: TBD		
23 November	Zambia International (cancelled): Host: Lusaka, Zambia; Venue: TBD; Level: Future Series; Format: TBD	Score:	
23 November	Zambia International (cancelled): Host: Lusaka, Zambia; Venue: TBD; Level: Future Series; Format: TBD	Score:	
23 November	Zambia International (cancelled): Host: Lusaka, Zambia; Venue: TBD; Level: Future Series; Format: TBD	Score:	
23 November	Zambia International (cancelled): Host: Lusaka, Zambia; Venue: TBD; Level: Future Series; Format: TBD	Score:	
23 November	Zambia International (cancelled): Host: Lusaka, Zambia; Venue: TBD; Level: Future Series; Format: TBD	Score:	
30 November	Italian International (cancelled) (Note: Tournament cancelled or postponed due to the COVID-19 pandemic on 2 October 2020.): Host: Milan, Italy; Venue: TBD; Level: International Challenge; Prize: $25,000; Format: TBD		
30 November	Italian International (cancelled): Host: Milan, Italy; Venue: TBD; Level: International Challenge; Prize: $25,000; Format: TBD	Score:	
30 November	Italian International (cancelled): Host: Milan, Italy; Venue: TBD; Level: International Challenge; Prize: $25,000; Format: TBD	Score:	
30 November	Italian International (cancelled): Host: Milan, Italy; Venue: TBD; Level: International Challenge; Prize: $25,000; Format: TBD	Score:	
30 November	Italian International (cancelled): Host: Milan, Italy; Venue: TBD; Level: International Challenge; Prize: $25,000; Format: TBD	Score:	
30 November	Italian International (cancelled): Host: Milan, Italy; Venue: TBD; Level: International Challenge; Prize: $25,000; Format: TBD	Score:	
30 November	Vietnam International Series (cancelled): Host: Danang, Vietnam; Venue: TBD; Level: International Series; Prize: $10,000; Format: TBD		
30 November	Vietnam International Series (cancelled): Host: Danang, Vietnam; Venue: TBD; Level: International Series; Prize: $10,000; Format: TBD	Score:	
30 November	Vietnam International Series (cancelled): Host: Danang, Vietnam; Venue: TBD; Level: International Series; Prize: $10,000; Format: TBD	Score:	
30 November	Vietnam International Series (cancelled): Host: Danang, Vietnam; Venue: TBD; Level: International Series; Prize: $10,000; Format: TBD	Score:	
30 November	Vietnam International Series (cancelled): Host: Danang, Vietnam; Venue: TBD; Level: International Series; Prize: $10,000; Format: TBD	Score:	
30 November	Vietnam International Series (cancelled): Host: Danang, Vietnam; Venue: TBD; Level: International Series; Prize: $10,000; Format: TBD	Score:	
30 November	Bangabandhu International Series (postponed): Host: Dhaka, Bangladesh; Venue: TBD; Level: International Series; Prize: $25,000; Format: TBD		
30 November	Bangabandhu International Series (postponed): Host: Dhaka, Bangladesh; Venue: TBD; Level: International Series; Prize: $25,000; Format: TBD	Score:	
30 November	Bangabandhu International Series (postponed): Host: Dhaka, Bangladesh; Venue: TBD; Level: International Series; Prize: $25,000; Format: TBD	Score:	
30 November	Bangabandhu International Series (postponed): Host: Dhaka, Bangladesh; Venue: TBD; Level: International Series; Prize: $25,000; Format: TBD	Score:	
30 November	Bangabandhu International Series (postponed): Host: Dhaka, Bangladesh; Venue: TBD; Level: International Series; Prize: $25,000; Format: TBD	Score:	
30 November	Bangabandhu International Series (postponed): Host: Dhaka, Bangladesh; Venue: TBD; Level: International Series; Prize: $25,000; Format: TBD	Score:	
30 November	South Africa International (cancelled): Host: Durban, South Africa; Venue: TBD; Level: Future Series; Format: TBD		
30 November	South Africa International (cancelled): Host: Durban, South Africa; Venue: TBD; Level: Future Series; Format: TBD	Score:	
30 November	South Africa International (cancelled): Host: Durban, South Africa; Venue: TBD; Level: Future Series; Format: TBD	Score:	
30 November	South Africa International (cancelled): Host: Durban, South Africa; Venue: TBD; Level: Future Series; Format: TBD	Score:	
30 November	South Africa International (cancelled): Host: Durban, South Africa; Venue: TBD; Level: Future Series; Format: TBD	Score:	
30 November	South Africa International (cancelled): Host: Durban, South Africa; Venue: TBD; Level: Future Series; Format: TBD	Score:	

=== December ===
Week commencing	Tournament	Champions	Runners-up
7 December	India Open (Draw) (cancelled): Host: New Delhi, India; Venue: K. D. Jadhav Indoor Stadium; Level: Super 500; Prize: $350,000; Format: 32MS/32WS/32MD/32WD/32XD		
7 December	India Open (Draw) (cancelled): Host: New Delhi, India; Venue: K. D. Jadhav Indoor Stadium; Level: Super 500; Prize: $350,000; Format: 32MS/32WS/32MD/32WD/32XD	Score:	
7 December	India Open (Draw) (cancelled): Host: New Delhi, India; Venue: K. D. Jadhav Indoor Stadium; Level: Super 500; Prize: $350,000; Format: 32MS/32WS/32MD/32WD/32XD	Score:	
7 December	India Open (Draw) (cancelled): Host: New Delhi, India; Venue: K. D. Jadhav Indoor Stadium; Level: Super 500; Prize: $350,000; Format: 32MS/32WS/32MD/32WD/32XD	Score:	
7 December	India Open (Draw) (cancelled): Host: New Delhi, India; Venue: K. D. Jadhav Indoor Stadium; Level: Super 500; Prize: $350,000; Format: 32MS/32WS/32MD/32WD/32XD	Score:	
7 December	India Open (Draw) (cancelled): Host: New Delhi, India; Venue: K. D. Jadhav Indoor Stadium; Level: Super 500; Prize: $350,000; Format: 32MS/32WS/32MD/32WD/32XD	Score:	
7 December	El Salvador International (cancelled) (Note: Tournament cancelled or postponed due to the COVID-19 pandemic on 5 November 2020.): Host: San Salvador, El Salvador; Venue: TBD; Level: Future Series; Format: TBD		
7 December	El Salvador International (cancelled): Host: San Salvador, El Salvador; Venue: TBD; Level: Future Series; Format: TBD	Score:	
7 December	El Salvador International (cancelled): Host: San Salvador, El Salvador; Venue: TBD; Level: Future Series; Format: TBD	Score:	
7 December	El Salvador International (cancelled): Host: San Salvador, El Salvador; Venue: TBD; Level: Future Series; Format: TBD	Score:	
7 December	El Salvador International (cancelled): Host: San Salvador, El Salvador; Venue: TBD; Level: Future Series; Format: TBD	Score:	
7 December	El Salvador International (cancelled): Host: San Salvador, El Salvador; Venue: TBD; Level: Future Series; Format: TBD	Score:	
14 December	Turkey Open (cancelled) (Note: Tournament cancelled or postponed due to the COVID-19 pandemic on 14 November 2020.): Host: Ankara, Turkey; Venue: TBD; Level: International Series; Prize: $10,000; Format: TBD		
14 December	Turkey Open (cancelled): Host: Ankara, Turkey; Venue: TBD; Level: International Series; Prize: $10,000; Format: TBD	Score:	
14 December	Turkey Open (cancelled): Host: Ankara, Turkey; Venue: TBD; Level: International Series; Prize: $10,000; Format: TBD	Score:	
14 December	Turkey Open (cancelled): Host: Ankara, Turkey; Venue: TBD; Level: International Series; Prize: $10,000; Format: TBD	Score:	
14 December	Turkey Open (cancelled): Host: Ankara, Turkey; Venue: TBD; Level: International Series; Prize: $10,000; Format: TBD	Score:	
14 December	Turkey Open (cancelled): Host: Ankara, Turkey; Venue: TBD; Level: International Series; Prize: $10,000; Format: TBD	Score:	

=== January 2021 ===
Date	Tournament	Champions	Runners-up
12–17 January 2021	Yonex Thailand Open (Draw): Host: Pak Kret, Nonthaburi, Thailand; Venue: Impact Arena; Level: Super 1000; Prize: $1,000,000; Format: 32MS/32WS/32MD/32WD/32XD	(Denmark) Viktor Axelsen	(Hong Kong) Ng Ka Long
12–17 January 2021	Yonex Thailand Open (Draw): Host: Pak Kret, Nonthaburi, Thailand; Venue: Impact Arena; Level: Super 1000; Prize: $1,000,000; Format: 32MS/32WS/32MD/32WD/32XD	Score: 21–14, 21–14	
12–17 January 2021	Yonex Thailand Open (Draw): Host: Pak Kret, Nonthaburi, Thailand; Venue: Impact Arena; Level: Super 1000; Prize: $1,000,000; Format: 32MS/32WS/32MD/32WD/32XD	(Spain) Carolina Marín	(Chinese Taipei) Tai Tzu-ying
12–17 January 2021	Yonex Thailand Open (Draw): Host: Pak Kret, Nonthaburi, Thailand; Venue: Impact Arena; Level: Super 1000; Prize: $1,000,000; Format: 32MS/32WS/32MD/32WD/32XD	Score: 21–9, 21–16	
12–17 January 2021	Yonex Thailand Open (Draw): Host: Pak Kret, Nonthaburi, Thailand; Venue: Impact Arena; Level: Super 1000; Prize: $1,000,000; Format: 32MS/32WS/32MD/32WD/32XD	(Chinese Taipei) Lee Yang (Chinese Taipei) Wang Chi-lin	(Malaysia) Goh V Shem (Malaysia) Tan Wee Kiong
12–17 January 2021	Yonex Thailand Open (Draw): Host: Pak Kret, Nonthaburi, Thailand; Venue: Impact Arena; Level: Super 1000; Prize: $1,000,000; Format: 32MS/32WS/32MD/32WD/32XD	Score: 21–16, 21–23, 21–19	
12–17 January 2021	Yonex Thailand Open (Draw): Host: Pak Kret, Nonthaburi, Thailand; Venue: Impact Arena; Level: Super 1000; Prize: $1,000,000; Format: 32MS/32WS/32MD/32WD/32XD	(Indonesia) Greysia Polii (Indonesia) Apriyani Rahayu	(Thailand) Jongkolphan Kititharakul (Thailand) Rawinda Prajongjai
12–17 January 2021	Yonex Thailand Open (Draw): Host: Pak Kret, Nonthaburi, Thailand; Venue: Impact Arena; Level: Super 1000; Prize: $1,000,000; Format: 32MS/32WS/32MD/32WD/32XD	Score: 21–15, 21–12	
12–17 January 2021	Yonex Thailand Open (Draw): Host: Pak Kret, Nonthaburi, Thailand; Venue: Impact Arena; Level: Super 1000; Prize: $1,000,000; Format: 32MS/32WS/32MD/32WD/32XD	(Thailand) Dechapol Puavaranukroh (Thailand) Sapsiree Taerattanachai	(Indonesia) Praveen Jordan (Indonesia) Melati Daeva Oktavianti
12–17 January 2021	Yonex Thailand Open (Draw): Host: Pak Kret, Nonthaburi, Thailand; Venue: Impact Arena; Level: Super 1000; Prize: $1,000,000; Format: 32MS/32WS/32MD/32WD/32XD	Score: 21–3, 20–22, 21–18	
19–24 January 2021	Toyota Thailand Open (Draw): Host: Pak Kret, Nonthaburi, Thailand; Venue: Impact Arena; Level: Super 1000; Prize: $1,000,000; Format: 32MS/32WS/32MD/32WD/32XD	(Denmark) Viktor Axelsen	(Denmark) Hans-Kristian Vittinghus
19–24 January 2021	Toyota Thailand Open (Draw): Host: Pak Kret, Nonthaburi, Thailand; Venue: Impact Arena; Level: Super 1000; Prize: $1,000,000; Format: 32MS/32WS/32MD/32WD/32XD	Score: 21–11, 21–7	
19–24 January 2021	Toyota Thailand Open (Draw): Host: Pak Kret, Nonthaburi, Thailand; Venue: Impact Arena; Level: Super 1000; Prize: $1,000,000; Format: 32MS/32WS/32MD/32WD/32XD	(Spain) Carolina Marín	(Chinese Taipei) Tai Tzu-ying
19–24 January 2021	Toyota Thailand Open (Draw): Host: Pak Kret, Nonthaburi, Thailand; Venue: Impact Arena; Level: Super 1000; Prize: $1,000,000; Format: 32MS/32WS/32MD/32WD/32XD	Score: 21–19, 21–17	
19–24 January 2021	Toyota Thailand Open (Draw): Host: Pak Kret, Nonthaburi, Thailand; Venue: Impact Arena; Level: Super 1000; Prize: $1,000,000; Format: 32MS/32WS/32MD/32WD/32XD	(Chinese Taipei) Lee Yang (Chinese Taipei) Wang Chi-lin	(Malaysia) Aaron Chia (Malaysia) Soh Wooi Yik
19–24 January 2021	Toyota Thailand Open (Draw): Host: Pak Kret, Nonthaburi, Thailand; Venue: Impact Arena; Level: Super 1000; Prize: $1,000,000; Format: 32MS/32WS/32MD/32WD/32XD	Score: 21–13, 21–18	
19–24 January 2021	Toyota Thailand Open (Draw): Host: Pak Kret, Nonthaburi, Thailand; Venue: Impact Arena; Level: Super 1000; Prize: $1,000,000; Format: 32MS/32WS/32MD/32WD/32XD	(South Korea) Kim So-yeong (South Korea) Kong Hee-yong	(South Korea) Lee So-hee (South Korea) Shin Seung-chan
19–24 January 2021	Toyota Thailand Open (Draw): Host: Pak Kret, Nonthaburi, Thailand; Venue: Impact Arena; Level: Super 1000; Prize: $1,000,000; Format: 32MS/32WS/32MD/32WD/32XD	Score: 21–18, 21–19	
19–24 January 2021	Toyota Thailand Open (Draw): Host: Pak Kret, Nonthaburi, Thailand; Venue: Impact Arena; Level: Super 1000; Prize: $1,000,000; Format: 32MS/32WS/32MD/32WD/32XD	(Thailand) Dechapol Puavaranukroh (Thailand) Sapsiree Taerattanachai	(South Korea) Seo Seung-jae (South Korea) Chae Yoo-jung
19–24 January 2021	Toyota Thailand Open (Draw): Host: Pak Kret, Nonthaburi, Thailand; Venue: Impact Arena; Level: Super 1000; Prize: $1,000,000; Format: 32MS/32WS/32MD/32WD/32XD	Score: 21–16, 22–20	
27–31 January 2021	BWF World Tour Finals (Draw): Host: Pak Kret, Nonthaburi, Thailand; Venue: Impact Arena; Level: World Tour Finals; Prize: $1,500,000; Format: 8MS/8WS/8MD/8WD/8XD	(Denmark) Anders Antonsen	(Denmark) Viktor Axelsen
27–31 January 2021	BWF World Tour Finals (Draw): Host: Pak Kret, Nonthaburi, Thailand; Venue: Impact Arena; Level: World Tour Finals; Prize: $1,500,000; Format: 8MS/8WS/8MD/8WD/8XD	Score: 21–16, 5–21, 21–17	
27–31 January 2021	BWF World Tour Finals (Draw): Host: Pak Kret, Nonthaburi, Thailand; Venue: Impact Arena; Level: World Tour Finals; Prize: $1,500,000; Format: 8MS/8WS/8MD/8WD/8XD	(Chinese Taipei) Tai Tzu-ying	(Spain) Carolina Marín
27–31 January 2021	BWF World Tour Finals (Draw): Host: Pak Kret, Nonthaburi, Thailand; Venue: Impact Arena; Level: World Tour Finals; Prize: $1,500,000; Format: 8MS/8WS/8MD/8WD/8XD	Score: 14–21, 21–8, 21–19	
27–31 January 2021	BWF World Tour Finals (Draw): Host: Pak Kret, Nonthaburi, Thailand; Venue: Impact Arena; Level: World Tour Finals; Prize: $1,500,000; Format: 8MS/8WS/8MD/8WD/8XD	(Chinese Taipei) Lee Yang (Chinese Taipei) Wang Chi-lin	(Indonesia) Mohammad Ahsan (Indonesia) Hendra Setiawan
27–31 January 2021	BWF World Tour Finals (Draw): Host: Pak Kret, Nonthaburi, Thailand; Venue: Impact Arena; Level: World Tour Finals; Prize: $1,500,000; Format: 8MS/8WS/8MD/8WD/8XD	Score: 21–17, 23–21	
27–31 January 2021	BWF World Tour Finals (Draw): Host: Pak Kret, Nonthaburi, Thailand; Venue: Impact Arena; Level: World Tour Finals; Prize: $1,500,000; Format: 8MS/8WS/8MD/8WD/8XD	(South Korea) Lee So-hee (South Korea) Shin Seung-chan	(South Korea) Kim So-yeong (South Korea) Kong Hee-yong
27–31 January 2021	BWF World Tour Finals (Draw): Host: Pak Kret, Nonthaburi, Thailand; Venue: Impact Arena; Level: World Tour Finals; Prize: $1,500,000; Format: 8MS/8WS/8MD/8WD/8XD	Score: 15–21, 26–24, 21–19	
27–31 January 2021	BWF World Tour Finals (Draw): Host: Pak Kret, Nonthaburi, Thailand; Venue: Impact Arena; Level: World Tour Finals; Prize: $1,500,000; Format: 8MS/8WS/8MD/8WD/8XD	(Thailand) Dechapol Puavaranukroh (Thailand) Sapsiree Taerattanachai	(South Korea) Seo Seung-jae (South Korea) Chae Yoo-jung
27–31 January 2021	BWF World Tour Finals (Draw): Host: Pak Kret, Nonthaburi, Thailand; Venue: Impact Arena; Level: World Tour Finals; Prize: $1,500,000; Format: 8MS/8WS/8MD/8WD/8XD	Score: 21–18, 8–21, 21–8	

== Retirements ==
Following is a list of notable players (winners of a main tour title, and/or part of the BWF Rankings top 100 for at least one week) who announced their retirement from professional badminton, during the 2020 season:

- Mathias Boe (born 11 July 1980 in Frederikssund, Denmark) reached a career high of no. 1 in the men's doubles on 11 November 2010. He was the gold medalist at the 2015 European Games, two time European champions winning in 2012 and 2017, and the silver medalist at the 2012 Summer Olympics. He was part of Denmark winning team at the 2016 Thomas Cup, European Mixed Team Championships in 2015 and 2017, and also seven European Men's Team Championships from 2006 to 2020. Boe has collected 3 World Tour title, 16 Superseries title, 12 Grand Prix title, and 14 Continental circuit title. Badminton Denmark announced his retirement on 23 April 2020. The 2020 All England Open was his last tournament.
- Tontowi Ahmad (born 18 July 1987 in Banyumas, Central Java, Indonesia) reached a career high of no. 1 in the mixed doubles on 3 May 2018. He won gold medals at the 2016 Rio Olympics; World Championships in 2013 and 2017; Asian Championships in 2015; and also 30 titles in BWF sanctioned tournaments, with three consecutive All England Open titles from 2012 to 2014. After spent 15-years of badminton career, he announced his retirement through social media account Instagram on 18 May 2020. The 2020 Indonesia Masters was his last tournament.
- Mads Conrad-Petersen (born 12 January 1988 in Brørup, Vejen, Denmark) reached a career high of no. 4 in the men's doubles on 14 May 2018. He was the 2007 European Junior and 2016 European champion. He was part of Denmark winning team at the 2016 Thomas Cup, European Mixed Team Championships in 2015 and 2017, and also 5 European Men's Team Championships from 2012 to 2020. He has collected 13 individual BWF circuit title. Conrad-Petersen retired from the international badminton on 20 May 2020, where he previously absent from the international tournament from November 2018 to March 2019. The 2020 All England Open was his last tournament.
- Chau Hoi Wah (born 5 June 1986 in Hong Kong) reached a career high of no. 6 in the mixed doubles on 16 June 2014. She won the 2014 Asian Championships, became the first ever Hong Kong player to win that title. She also won a bronze medal at the 2017 World Championships, in addition to 7 international individual titles. She spent 15 years in Hong Kong team, and announced her retirement on her 34th birthday (5 June 2020). She then returned to Toronto, Canada, joining her family, and starting a new career as a coach in a local club. The 2019 Macau Open was her last tournament.
- Lin Dan (born 14 October 1983 in Longyan, Fujian, China) reached a career high of no. 1 in the men's singles on 26 February 2004. Having won 66 individual titles, including 2 gold medals at the Olympic Games, 5 golds at the World Championships, 2 golds at the World Cup, 2 golds at the Asian Games and 4 golds at the Asian Championships; and also in the team event won 5 Sudirman Cup, 6 Thomas Cup, and 3 Asian Games titles. After spent 20 years in the competitive international tournaments, he announced his retirement on social media on 4 July 2020. The 2020 All England Open was his last tournament.
- Carsten Mogensen (born 24 July 1983 in Roskilde, Denmark) reached a career high of no. 1 in the men's doubles on 11 November 2010. He was the gold medalist at the 2015 European Games, two time European champions winning in 2012 and 2017, and the silver medalist at the 2012 Summer Olympics. He was part of Denmark winning team at the European Mixed Team Championships in 2015 and 2017, and also seven European Men's Team Championships from 2006 to 2020. Mogensen has collected 35 individual BWF circuit title, including three Superseries Finals title. Badminton Denmark reported his retirement from the national team on 7 July 2020. The 2020 Spain Masters was his last international tournament.
- Jelle Maas (born 19 February 1991 in Oosterhout, Netherlands) reached a career high of no. 26 in the men's doubles and no. 44 in the mixed doubles. He won the men's doubles bronze medals at the 2018 European Championships and at the 2019 European Games, in addition to another 4 BWF sanctioned international titles. Badminton Nederland announced his retirement from the international tours on 22 July 2020, and officially left the national training center on 1 September 2020. The 2020 All England Open was his last tournament.
- Ayaka Takahashi (born 19 April 1990 in Kashihara, Nara, Japan) reached a career high of no. 1 in the women's doubles on 20 October 2014. She won a gold medal at the 2016 Rio Olympics, won the world women's team championships (Uber Cup) in 2018, two times Asian Champions in 2016 and 2017, in addition to another 27 international titles, including the year-end tournament finals in 2014 and 2018; and the historical tournament All England Open in 2016. She announced her retirement in an online conference on 19 August 2020, and officially left the national team on 30 August. The 2020 All England Open was her last tournament.
- Jan Ø. Jørgensen (born 31 December 1987 in Svenstrup, Aalborg Municipality, Denmark) reached a career high of no. 2 in the men's singles on 22 January 2015. He won the title at the 2014 European Championships, and a bronze medal at the 2015 World Championships. He was part of Denmark winning team at the 2016 Thomas Cup, four European Mixed Team Championships, and seven European Men's Team Championships. He also won 10 BWF International title including a Superseries Premier event in Indonesia and China. He retired from international events after a quarter-final defeat in the 2020 Denmark Open on 16 October 2020.
- Emma Karlsson (born 16 May 1998 in Älmhult, Sweden) reached a career high of no. 37 in the women's doubles on 10 September 2019. She won the girls' doubles title at the 2017 European Junior Championships. She also won three senior international title. Badminton Europe reported her retirement on 14 November 2020. The 2020 All England Open was her last tournament.
