= 2017 European Junior Badminton Championships – Teams event =

2017 European Junior Badminton Championships – Mixed team
- Venue: Centre Sportif Regional d'Alsace
- Location: Mulhouse, France
- Dates: 7 April 2017 – 11 April 2017
- Nations: 26

Medalists
gold medal	France
silver medal	Russia
bronze medal	Denmark
bronze medal	England

The mixed team tournament of the 2017 European Junior Badminton Championships was held from 7 to 11 April 2017.

== Tournament ==
=== Venue ===
This tournament was held at Centre Sportif Regional d'Alsace in Mulhouse, France.

=== Draw ===
Group 1	Group 2	Group 3	Group 4	Group 5	Group 6
Czech Republic; Denmark; Estonia; Norway	England; Slovakia; Sweden; Switzerland	Belgium; France; Ireland; Ukraine	Finland; Hungary; Russia; Turkey	Austria; Germany; Latvia; Poland; Slovenia	Bulgaria; Netherlands; Portugal; Scotland; Spain

== Group stage ==
=== Group 1 ===
Pos	Team	Pld	W	L	MF	MA	MD	GF	GA	GD	PF	PA	PD	Pts	Qualification	Denmark	Czech Republic	Estonia	Norway
1	Denmark	3	3	0	13	2	+11	27	5	+22	641	443	+198	3	Advance to knockout stage	—	3–2	5–0	5–0
2	Czech Republic	3	2	1	11	4	+7	23	10	+13	649	497	+152	2			—	4–1	5–0
3	Estonia	3	1	2	5	10	−5	11	21	−10	504	614	−110	1				—	4–1
4	Norway	3	0	3	1	14	−13	3	28	−25	409	649	−240	0					—

Source: BWF

==== Denmark vs Czech Republic ====
Denmark
4
Centre Sportif Regional d'Alsace, Court 1
7 April 2017, 10:00 UTC+2

Czech Republic
1

			1	2	3
1	(Denmark) (Czech Republic)	Daniel Lundgaard / Alexandra Bøje; Petr Beran / Tereza Švábíková	21; 19	21; 16
2	(Denmark) (Czech Republic)	Karl Thor Søndergaard; Jan Louda	19; 21	7; 21
3	(Denmark) (Czech Republic)	Julie Dawall Jakobsen; Bára Hadáčková	21; 18	21; 13
4	(Denmark) (Czech Republic)	Paw Eriksen / Emil Hybel; Petr Beran / Ondřej Král	18; 21	21; 14	13; 21
5	(Denmark) (Czech Republic)	Alexandra Bøje / Freja Ravn; Tereza Švábíková / Monika Svetnickova	21; 15	21; 14

==== Norway vs Estonia ====
Norway
1
Centre Sportif Regional d'Alsace, Court 3
7 April 2017, 10:00 UTC+2

Estonia
4

			1	2	3
1	(Norway) (Estonia)	Ole Herman Imset / Marie Christensen; Marcus Lõo / Kati-Kreet Marran	12; 21	7; 21
2	(Norway) (Estonia)	Markus Barth; Matis Kaart	22; 20	21; 19
3	(Norway) (Estonia)	Emilie Hamang; Mari Ann Karjus	15; 21	19; 21
4	(Norway) (Estonia)	Markus Barth / Mattias Xu; Karl Kert / Marcus Lõo	17; 21	11; 21
5	(Norway) (Estonia)	Marie Christensen / Vera Ellingsen; Kati-Kreet Käsner / Liisa-Lotta Tannik	14; 21	22; 24

==== Norway vs Czech Republic ====
Norway
0
Centre Sportif Regional d'Alsace, Court 2
8 April 2017, 14:30 UTC+2

Czech Republic
5

			1	2	3
1	(Norway) (Czech Republic)	Mattias Xu / Emilie Storvik; Petr Beran / Monika Světničková	12; 21	6; 21
2	(Norway) (Czech Republic)	Markus Barth; Jan Louda	5; 21	11; 21
3	(Norway) (Czech Republic)	Vera Ellingsen; Monika Světničková	21; 19	11; 21	17; 21
4	(Norway) (Czech Republic)	Ole Herman Imset / Mattias Xu; Matěj Hubáček / Ondřej Král	12; 21	7; 21
5	(Norway) (Czech Republic)	Emilie Hamang / Emilie Storvik; Berta Ausbergerová / Tereza Švábíková	17; 21	17; 21

==== Denmark vs Estonia ====
Denmark
5
Centre Sportif Regional d'Alsace, Court 3
8 April 2017, 14:30 UTC+2

Estonia
0

			1	2	3
1	(Denmark) (Estonia)	Karl Thor Søndergaard; Hans-Kristjan Pilve	21; 12	21; 6
2	(Denmark) (Estonia)	Irina Amalie Andersen; Kati-Kreet Marran	21; 8	21; 12
3	(Denmark) (Estonia)	Paw Eriksen / Mads Thøgersen; Karl Kert / Marcus Lõo	21; 16	21; 13
4	(Denmark) (Estonia)	Amalie Magelund / Freja Ravn; Mari Ann Karjus / Kati-Kreet Marran	21; 16	17; 21	21; 11
5	(Denmark) (Estonia)	Daniel Lundgaard / Alexandra Bøje; Matis Kaart / Hannaliina Piho	21; 10	21; 12

==== Denmark vs Norway ====
Denmark
5
Centre Sportif Regional d'Alsace, Court 5
9 April 2017, 14:00 UTC+2

Norway
0

			1	2	3
1	(Denmark) (Norway)	Line Christophersen; Vera Ellingsen	21; 10	21; 7
2	(Denmark) (Norway)	Karl Thor Søndergaard; Markus Barth	21; 15	21; 12
3	(Denmark) (Norway)	Alexandra Bøje / Julie Dawall Jakobsen; Emilie Hamang / Emilie Storvik	21; 12	21; 3
4	(Denmark) (Norway)	Paw Eriksen / Mads Thøgersen; Markus Barth / Ole Herman Imset	21; 18	21; 7
5	(Denmark) (Norway)	Daniel Lundgaard / Amalie Magelund; Mattias Xu / Emilie Storvik	21; 15	21; 14

==== Estonia vs Czech Republic ====
Estonia
1
Centre Sportif Regional d'Alsace, Court 6
9 April 2017, 14:00 UTC+2

Czech Republic
4

			1	2	3
1	(Estonia) (Czech Republic)	Marcus Lõo / Kati-Kreet Marran; Petr Beran / Bára Hadáčková	17; 21	19; 21
2	(Estonia) (Czech Republic)	Hans-Kristjan Pilve; Ondřej Král	8; 21	3; 21
3	(Estonia) (Czech Republic)	Mari Ann Karjus; Tereza Švábíková	14; 21	9; 21
4	(Estonia) (Czech Republic)	Matis Kaart / Marcus Lõo; Petr Beran / Jan Louda	10; 21	12; 21
5	(Estonia) (Czech Republic)	Mari Ann Karjus / Kati-Kreet Marran; Berta Ausbergerová / Tereza Švábíková	21; 17	23; 25	21; 17

=== Group 2 ===
Pos	Team	Pld	W	L	MF	MA	MD	GF	GA	GD	PF	PA	PD	Pts	Qualification	England	Sweden	Switzerland	Slovakia
1	England	3	3	0	13	2	+11	27	6	+21	666	478	+188	3	Advance to knockout stage	—	4–1	4–1	5–0
2	Sweden	3	2	1	10	5	+5	22	12	+10	624	554	+70	2			—	4–1	5–0
3	Switzerland	3	1	2	7	8	−1	15	17	−2	563	584	−21	1				—	5–0
4	Slovakia	3	0	3	0	15	−15	1	30	−29	419	656	−237	0					—

Source: BWF

==== Sweden vs Switzerland ====
Sweden
4
Centre Sportif Regional d'Alsace, Court 2
7 April 2017, 14:00 UTC+2

Switzerland
1

			1	2	3
1	(Sweden) (Switzerland)	Oskar Svensson; David Orteu	14; 21	21; 16	19; 21
2	(Sweden) (Switzerland)	Johanna Magnusson; Jenjira Stadelmann	21; 15	21; 17
3	(Sweden) (Switzerland)	Adam Gozzi / Carl Harrbacka; David Orteu / Julien Scheiwiller	21; 15	21; 16
4	(Sweden) (Switzerland)	Emma Karlsson / Johanna Magnusson; Aline Müller / Jenjira Stadelmann	21; 9	21; 7
5	(Sweden) (Switzerland)	Carl Harrbacka / Tilda Sjöö; Nicolas Müller / Indira Dickhäuser	21; 14	21; 16

==== England vs Slovakia ====
England
5
Centre Sportif Regional d'Alsace, Court 6
7 April 2017, 14:00 UTC+2

Slovakia
0

			1	2	3
1	(England) (Slovakia)	Max Flynn / Lizzie Tolman; Adam Horák / Mia Tarcalová	21; 9	21; 7
2	(England) (Slovakia)	David Jones; Richard Šmatlák	21; 4	21; 11
3	(England) (Slovakia)	Abigail Holden; Katarína Vargová	21; 15	21; 15
4	(England) (Slovakia)	Zach Russ / Steven Stallwood; Adam Horák / Peter Hrnčár	21; 12	23; 21
5	(England) (Slovakia)	Fee Teng Liew / Lizzie Tolman; Mia Tarcalová / Katarína Vargová	21; 18	21; 12

==== England vs Switzerland ====
England
4
Centre Sportif Regional d'Alsace, Court 1
8 April 2017, 11:00 UTC+2

Switzerland
1

			1	2	3
1	(England) (Switzerland)	Callum Hemming / Fee Teng Liew; Nicolas Müller / Indira Dickhäuser	21; 12	21; 18
2	(England) (Switzerland)	Johnnie Torjussen; Tobias Künzi	9; 21	21; 13	21; 17
3	(England) (Switzerland)	Abigail Holden; Jenjira Stadelmann	21; 10	22; 20
4	(England) (Switzerland)	Max Flynn / Callum Hemming; David Orteu / Julien Scheiwiller	21; 13	21; 13
5	(England) (Switzerland)	Fee Teng Liew / Lizzie Tolman; Aline Müller / Jenjira Stadelmann	18; 21	20; 22

==== Sweden vs Slovakia ====
Sweden
5
Centre Sportif Regional d'Alsace, Court 4
8 April 2017, 11:00 UTC+2

Slovakia
0

			1	2	3
1	(Sweden) (Slovakia)	Adam Gozzi / Tilda Sjöö; Adam Horák / Mia Tarcalová	21; 13	21; 13
2	(Sweden) (Slovakia)	Viktor Aglinder; Peter Hrnčár	21; 13	21; 14
3	(Sweden) (Slovakia)	Ashwathi Pillai; Katarína Vargová	18; 21	21; 14	21; 17
4	(Sweden) (Slovakia)	Adam Gozzi / Carl Harrbacka; Adam Horák / Peter Hrnčár	21; 14	21; 11
5	(Sweden) (Slovakia)	Emma Karlsson / Johanna Magnusson; Mia Tarcalová / Katarína Vargová	21; 9	21; 10

==== Switzerland vs Slovakia ====
Switzerland
5
Centre Sportif Regional d'Alsace, Court 3
9 April 2017, 10:00 UTC+2

Slovakia
0

			1	2	3
1	(Switzerland) (Slovakia)	Julien Scheiwiller; Richard Šmatlák	21; 15	21; 6
2	(Switzerland) (Slovakia)	Aline Müller; Mia Tarcalová	21; 19	21; 16
3	(Switzerland) (Slovakia)	David Orteu / Julien Scheiwiller; Adam Horák / Peter Hrnčár	21; 14	27; 25
4	(Switzerland) (Slovakia)	Aline Müller / Jenjira Stadelmann; Mia Tarcalová / Katarína Vargová	21; 17	21; 14
5	(Switzerland) (Slovakia)	Nicolas Müller / Indira Dickhäuser; Andrej Antoška / Alexandra Remeňová	21; 12	21; 8

==== England vs Sweden ====
England
4
Centre Sportif Regional d'Alsace, Court 5
9 April 2017, 10:00 UTC+2

Sweden
1

			1	2	3
1	(England) (Sweden)	Max Flynn / Lizzie Tolman; Carl Harrbacka / Tilda Sjöö	17; 21	25; 23	21; 12
2	(England) (Sweden)	David Jones; Viktor Aglinder	21; 6	21; 12
3	(England) (Sweden)	Abigail Holden; Johanna Magnusson	21; 12	21; 12
4	(England) (Sweden)	Max Flynn / Callum Hemming; Adam Gozzi / Carl Harrbacka	21; 13	21; 10
5	(England) (Sweden)	Fee Teng Liew / Lizzie Tolman; Emma Karlsson / Johanna Magnusson	14; 21	21; 11	14; 21

=== Group 3 ===
Pos	Team	Pld	W	L	MF	MA	MD	GF	GA	GD	PF	PA	PD	Pts	Qualification	France	Belgium	Ireland	Ukraine
1	France (H)	3	3	0	12	3	+9	25	8	+17	673	508	+165	3	Advance to knockout stage	—	4–1	4–1	4–1
2	Belgium	3	1	2	7	8	−1	17	18	−1	618	658	−40	1			—	2–3	4–1
3	Ireland	3	1	2	6	9	−3	15	20	−5	624	654	−30	1				—	2–3
4	Ukraine	3	1	2	5	10	−5	11	22	−11	514	609	−95	1					—

Source: BWF
(H) Host

==== France vs Ireland ====
France
4
Centre Sportif Regional d'Alsace, Court 1
7 April 2017, 14:00 UTC+2

Ireland
1

			1	2	3
1	(France) (Republic of Ireland)	Thom Gicquel / Delphine Delrue; Paul Reynolds / Moya Ryan	21; 11	21; 19
2	(France) (Republic of Ireland)	Léo Rossi; Nhat Nguyen	17; 21	20; 22
3	(France) (Republic of Ireland)	Yaëlle Hoyaux; Kate Frost	21; 15	21; 16
4	(France) (Republic of Ireland)	Thom Gicquel / Toma Junior Popov; Nhat Nguyen / Paul Reynolds	22; 20	14; 21	21; 19
5	(France) (Republic of Ireland)	Vimala Hériau / Margot Lambert; Kate Frost / Moya Ryan	21; 17	21; 19

==== Ukraine vs Belgium ====
Ukraine
1
Centre Sportif Regional d'Alsace, Court 5
7 April 2017, 14:00 UTC+2

Belgium
4

			1	2	3
1	(Ukraine) (Belgium)	Maryna Ilyinskaya; Joke de Langhe	21; 4	21; 8
2	(Ukraine) (Belgium)	Oleksandr Shmundyak; Elias Bracke	15; 21	22; 20	14; 21
3	(Ukraine) (Belgium)	Anastasiya Prozorova / Valeriya Rudakova; Joke de Langhe / Lise Jaques	12; 21	19; 21
4	(Ukraine) (Belgium)	Roman Altunian / Oleksandr Chakalov; Julien Carraggi / Jona van Nieuwkerke	12; 21	20; 22
5	(Ukraine) (Belgium)	Oleksandr Shmundyak / Yevgeniya Paksyutova; Elias Bracke / Lise Jaques	12; 21	20; 22

==== France vs Belgium ====
France
4
Centre Sportif Regional d'Alsace, Court 1
8 April 2017, 14:30 UTC+2

Belgium
1

			1	2	3
1	(France) (Belgium)	Yaëlle Hoyaux; Joke de Langhe	21; 13	21; 10
2	(France) (Belgium)	Arnaud Merklé; Julien Carraggi	21; 14	21; 9
3	(France) (Belgium)	Vimala Hériau / Margot Lambert; Joke de Langhe / Lise Jaques	22; 24	13; 21
4	(France) (Belgium)	Toma Junior Popov / Léo Rossi; Guillaume Bonnet / Jona van Nieuwkerke	21; 10	21; 8
5	(France) (Belgium)	Thomas Baures / Delphine Delrue; Elias Bracke / Lise Jaques	21; 17	20; 22	24; 22

==== Ukraine vs Ireland ====
Ukraine
3
Centre Sportif Regional d'Alsace, Court 4
8 April 2017, 14:30 UTC+2

Ireland
2

			1	2	3
1	(Ukraine) (Republic of Ireland)	Danylo Bosniuk / Yevgeniya Paksyutova; Paul Reynolds / Moya Ryan	16; 21	21; 9	21; 15
2	(Ukraine) (Republic of Ireland)	Roman Altunian; Nhat Nguyen	7; 21	12; 21
3	(Ukraine) (Republic of Ireland)	Maryna Ilyinskaya; Beth Stephenson	21; 11	21; 11
4	(Ukraine) (Republic of Ireland)	Mykhaylo Makhnovskiy / Ivan Medynskiy; Adam McAllister / Paul Reynolds	13; 21	14; 21
5	(Ukraine) (Republic of Ireland)	Maryna Ilyinskaya / Yevgeniya Paksyutova; Kate Frost / Moya Ryan	21; 15	21; 14

==== Belgium vs Ireland ====
Belgium
2
Centre Sportif Regional d'Alsace, Court 2
9 April 2017, 10:00 UTC+2

Ireland
3

			1	2	3
1	(Belgium) (Republic of Ireland)	Clara Lassaux; Beth Stephenson	20; 22	21; 17	18; 21
2	(Belgium) (Republic of Ireland)	Elias Bracke; Nhat Nguyen	9; 21	21; 17	22; 20
3	(Belgium) (Republic of Ireland)	Joke de Langhe / Lise Jaques; Kate Frost / Moya Ryan	20; 22	19; 21
4	(Belgium) (Republic of Ireland)	Guillaume Bonnet / Julien Carraggi; Adam McAllister / Paul Reynolds	21; 16	19; 21	14; 21
5	(Belgium) (Republic of Ireland)	Jona van Nieuwkerke / Joke de Langhe; Brian O'Mahony / Clodagh Dunne	21; 14	21; 11

==== France vs Ukraine ====
France
4
Centre Sportif Regional d'Alsace, Court 6
9 April 2017, 10:00 UTC+2

Ukraine
1

			1	2	3
1	(France) (Ukraine)	Thom Gicquel / Vimala Hériau; Mykhaylo Makhnovskiy / Anastasiya Prozorova	21; 12	21; 12
2	(France) (Ukraine)	Toma Junior Popov; Danylo Bosniuk	21; 4	21; 5
3	(France) (Ukraine)	Yaëlle Hoyaux; Valeriya Rudakova	21; 10	21; 8
4	(France) (Ukraine)	Thomas Baures / Léo Rossi; Mykhaylo Makhnovskiy / Ivan Medynskiy	21; 11	21; 14
5	(France) (Ukraine)	Léonice Huet / Margot Lambert; Anastasiya Prozorova / Valeriya Rudakova	21; 19	20; 22	18; 21

=== Group 4 ===
Pos	Team	Pld	W	L	MF	MA	MD	GF	GA	GD	PF	PA	PD	Pts	Qualification	Russia	Turkey	Finland	Hungary
1	Russia	3	3	0	11	4	+7	23	9	+14	640	488	+152	3	Advance to knockout stage	—	4–1	3–2	4–1
2	Turkey	3	2	1	9	6	+3	20	13	+7	605	556	+49	2			—	4–1	4–1
3	Finland	3	1	2	7	8	−1	15	19	−4	586	634	−48	1				—	4–1
4	Hungary	3	0	3	3	12	−9	8	25	−17	508	661	−153	0					—

Source: BWF

==== Turkey vs Hungary ====
Turkey
4
Centre Sportif Regional d'Alsace, Court 3
7 April 2017, 14:00 UTC+2

Hungary
1

			1	2	3
1	(Turkey) (Hungary)	Aliye Demirbağ; Vivien Sándorházi	21; 12	22; 20
2	(Turkey) (Hungary)	Yusuf Yaşar; Gergő Pytel	18; 21	21; 19	13; 21
3	(Turkey) (Hungary)	Bengisu Erçetin / Nazlıcan İnci; Anett Karsai / Réka Madarász	23; 21	21; 16
4	(Turkey) (Hungary)	Serhat Salım / Baran Yüksel; Zsombor Dulcz / Ákos Mórocz	21; 10	21; 10
5	(Turkey) (Hungary)	Emre Sönmez / Bengisu Erçetin; Gergő Pytel / Réka Madarász	21; 10	17; 21	21; 17

==== Russia vs Finland ====
Russia
3
Centre Sportif Regional d'Alsace, Court 4
7 April 2017, 14:00 UTC+2

Finland
2

			1	2	3
1	(Russia) (Finland)	Anastasiia Pustinskaia; Maija Krzywacki	21; 12	23; 21
2	(Russia) (Finland)	Georgii Karpov; Jesper Paul	17; 21	21; 14	18; 21
3	(Russia) (Finland)	Alina Davletova / Anastasiia Semenova; Maija Krzywacki / Iina Suutarinen	21; 9	21; 19
4	(Russia) (Finland)	Pavel Kotsarenko / Mikhail Lavrikov; Justus Kilpi / Anton Monnberg	17; 21	18; 21
5	(Russia) (Finland)	Rodion Alimov / Alina Davletova; Jere Övermark / Iina Suutarinen	21; 15	19; 21	21; 14

==== Turkey vs Finland ====
Turkey
4
Centre Sportif Regional d'Alsace, Court 5
8 April 2017, 14:30 UTC+2

Finland
1

			1	2	3
1	(Turkey) (Finland)	Aliye Demirbağ; Pihla Lindberg	21; 12	21; 11
2	(Turkey) (Finland)	Berkay Cicen; Justus Kilpi	8; 21	22; 20	18; 21
3	(Turkey) (Finland)	Bengisu Erçetin / Nazlıcan İnci; Maija Krzywacki / Iina Suutarinen	21; 7	21; 13
4	(Turkey) (Finland)	Serhat Salım / Baran Yüksel; Anton Monnberg / Jere Övermark	21; 17	21; 15
5	(Turkey) (Finland)	Emre Sönmez / Bengisu Erçetin; Jesper Paul / Iina Suutarinen	21; 15	21; 10

==== Russia vs Hungary ====
Russia
4
Centre Sportif Regional d'Alsace, Court 6
8 April 2017, 14:30 UTC+2

Hungary
1

			1	2	3
1	(Russia) (Hungary)	Rodion Alimov / Alina Davletova; Zsombor Dulcz / Vivien Sándorházi	21; 5	21; 7
2	(Russia) (Hungary)	Nikita Lemeshko; Gergő Pytel	21; 19	21; 16
3	(Russia) (Hungary)	Anastasiia Semenova; Vivien Sándorházi	20; 22	18; 21
4	(Russia) (Hungary)	Rodion Alimov / Pavel Kotsarenko; Zsombor Dulcz / Ákos Mórocz	21; 10	21; 7
5	(Russia) (Hungary)	Alina Davletova / Anastasiia Semenova; Anett Karsai / Réka Madarász	21; 17	21; 6

==== Turkey vs Russia ====
Turkey
1
Centre Sportif Regional d'Alsace, Court 1
9 April 2017, 10:00 UTC+2

Russia
4

			1	2	3
1	(Turkey) (Russia)	Emre Sönmez / Bengisu Erçetin; Rodion Alimov / Alina Davletova	10; 21	16; 21
2	(Turkey) (Russia)	Berkay Cicen; Nikita Lemeshko	13; 21	15; 21
3	(Turkey) (Russia)	Aliye Demirbağ; Anastasiia Shapovalova	21; 9	21; 19
4	(Turkey) (Russia)	Serhat Salım / Baran Yüksel; Rodion Alimov / Pavel Kotsarenko	10; 21	17; 21
5	(Turkey) (Russia)	Bengisu Erçetin / Nazlıcan İnci; Alina Davletova / Anastasiia Semenova	12; 21	14; 21

==== Finland vs Hungary ====
Finland
4
Centre Sportif Regional d'Alsace, Court 4
9 April 2017, 10:00 UTC+2

Hungary
1

			1	2	3
1	(Finland) (Hungary)	Jere Övermark / Iina Suutarinen; Zsombor Dulcz / Anett Karsai	21; 16	21; 8
2	(Finland) (Hungary)	Anton Monnberg; Ákos Mórocz	21; 10	21; 17
3	(Finland) (Hungary)	Maija Krzywacki; Réka Madarász	20; 22	15; 21
4	(Finland) (Hungary)	Justus Kilpi / Jesper Paul; Zsombor Dulcz / Ákos Mórocz	21; 11	21; 17
5	(Finland) (Hungary)	Maija Krzywacki / Iina Suutarinen; Anett Karsai / Vivien Sándorházi	12; 21	21; 18	21; 19

=== Group 5 ===
Pos	Team	Pld	W	L	MF	MA	MD	GF	GA	GD	PF	PA	PD	Pts	Qualification	Germany	Poland	Slovenia	Austria	Latvia
1	Germany	4	4	0	15	5	+10	32	14	+18	905	742	+163	4	Advance to knockout stage	—	3–2	3–2	4–1	5–0
2	Poland	4	3	1	15	5	+10	31	12	+19	839	709	+130	3			—	4–1	5–0	4–1
3	Slovenia	4	2	2	13	7	+6	28	18	+10	881	802	+79	2				—	5–0	5–0
4	Austria	4	1	3	4	16	−12	11	33	−22	709	859	−150	1					—	3–2
5	Latvia	4	0	4	3	17	−14	10	35	−25	671	893	−222	0						—

Source: BWF

==== Germany vs Latvia ====
Germany
5
Centre Sportif Regional d'Alsace, Court 5
7 April 2017, 10:00 UTC+2

Latvia
0

			1	2	3
1	(Germany) (Latvia)	Julian Voigt / Judith Petrikowski; Kristaps Kalniņš / Liāna Lenceviča	21; 10	21; 12
2	(Germany) (Latvia)	Lukas Resch; Niks Podosinoviks	16; 21	21; 12	21; 15
3	(Germany) (Latvia)	Yvonne Li; Una Berga	21; 11	21; 12
4	(Germany) (Latvia)	Hauke Graalmann / Jan Colin Völker; Kristaps Kalniņš / Niks Podosinoviks	21; 14	21; 10
5	(Germany) (Latvia)	Emma Moszczynski / Liāna Lenceviča; Una Berga / Liāna Lenceviča	21; 14	21; 16

==== Slovenia vs Poland ====
Slovenia
1
Centre Sportif Regional d'Alsace, Court 6
7 April 2017, 10:00 UTC+2

Poland
4

			1	2	3
1	(Slovenia) (Poland)	Miha Ivančič / Petra Polanc; Paweł Śmiłowski / Magdalena Świerczyńska	14; 21	22; 24
2	(Slovenia) (Poland)	Miha Ivanič; Michał Kikosicki	21; 19	21; 12
3	(Slovenia) (Poland)	Nika Arih; Wiktoria Dąbczyńska	16; 21	11; 21
4	(Slovenia) (Poland)	Miha Ivančič / Miha Ivanič; Robert Cybulski / Paweł Śmiłowski	16; 21	25; 23	18; 21
5	(Slovenia) (Poland)	Nika Arih / Petra Polanc; Wiktoria Dąbczyńska / Aleksandra Goszczyńska	21; 23	14; 21

==== Germany vs Poland ====
Germany
2
Centre Sportif Regional d'Alsace, Court 1
7 April 2017, 18:00 UTC+2

Poland
3

			1	2	3
1	(Germany) (Poland)	Samuel Hsiao; Michał Kikosicki	21; 17	21; 19
2	(Germany) (Poland)	Yvonne Li; Zuzanna Glijer	21; 12	21; 8
3	(Germany) (Poland)	Hauke Graalmann / Jan Colin Völker; Robert Cybulski / Paweł Śmiłowski	21; 19	21; 23	21; 12
4	(Germany) (Poland)	Judith Petrikowski / Annika Schreiber; Wiktoria Dąbczyńska / Aleksandra Goszczyńska	17; 21	9; 21
5	(Germany) (Poland)	Jan Colin Völker / Emma Moszczynski; Paweł Śmiłowski / Magdalena Świerczyńska	19; 21	14; 21

==== Austria vs Latvia ====
Austria
3
Centre Sportif Regional d'Alsace, Court 2
7 April 2017, 18:00 UTC+2

Latvia
2

			1	2	3
1	(Austria) (Latvia)	Jakob Sorger / Serena Au Yeong; Kristaps Kalniņš / Liāna Lenceviča	18; 21	21; 18	19; 21
2	(Austria) (Latvia)	Philipp Drexler; Niks Podosinoviks	18; 21	14; 21
3	(Austria) (Latvia)	Katharina Hochmeir; Una Berga	21; 10	21; 8
4	(Austria) (Latvia)	Philip Birker / Jakob Sorger; Kristaps Kalniņš / Niks Podosinoviks	21; 17	21; 16
5	(Austria) (Latvia)	Natalie Herbst / Nina Sorger; Una Berga / Liāna Lenceviča	21; 14	21; 11

==== Slovenia vs Austria ====
Slovenia
5
Centre Sportif Regional d'Alsace, Court 2
8 April 2017, 11:00 UTC+2

Austria
0

			1	2	3
1	(Slovenia) (Austria)	Nika Arih / Miha Ivanič; Jakob Sorger / Serena Au Yeong	21; 10	21; 15
2	(Slovenia) (Austria)	Petra Polanc; Natalie Herbst	21; 13	15; 21	21; 18
3	(Slovenia) (Austria)	Miha Ivanič; Philipp Drexler	21; 8	21; 17
4	(Slovenia) (Austria)	Nika Arih / Petra Polanc; Natalie Herbst / Nina Sorger	21; 15	21; 15
5	(Slovenia) (Austria)	Miha Ivančič / Rok Jerčinovič; Philip Birker / Jakob Sorger	21; 19	21; 16

==== Poland vs Latvia ====
Poland
4
Centre Sportif Regional d'Alsace, Court 3
8 April 2017, 11:00 UTC+2

Latvia
1

			1	2	3
1	(Poland) (Latvia)	Paweł Śmiłowski / Magdalena Świerczyńska; Kristaps Kalniņš / Liāna Lenceviča	21; 4	21; 6
2	(Poland) (Latvia)	Michał Sobolewski; Niks Podosinoviks	13; 21	13; 21
3	(Poland) (Latvia)	Wiktoria Dąbczyńska; Una Berga	21; 13	21; 17
4	(Poland) (Latvia)	Konrad Płoch / Radosław Wróbel; Kristaps Kalniņš / Niks Podosinoviks	10; 21	21; 15	21; 16
5	(Poland) (Latvia)	Wiktoria Adamek / Izabela Pajek; Una Berga / Liāna Lenceviča	22; 20	21; 14

==== Slovenia vs Latvia ====
Slovenia
5
Centre Sportif Regional d'Alsace, Court 5
8 April 2017, 18:00 UTC+2

Latvia
0

			1	2	3
1	(Slovenia) (Latvia)	Nika Arih / Miha Ivanič; Kristaps Kalniņš / Liāna Lenceviča	21; 14	21; 11
2	(Slovenia) (Latvia)	Rok Jerčinovič; Niks Podosinoviks	15; 21	21; 10	21; 19
3	(Slovenia) (Latvia)	Petra Polanc; Una Berga	21; 10	21; 15
4	(Slovenia) (Latvia)	Miha Ivančič / Rok Jerčinovič; Kristaps Kalniņš / Niks Podosinoviks	23; 21	19; 21	21; 12
5	(Slovenia) (Latvia)	Nika Arih / Petra Polanc; Una Berga / Liāna Lenceviča	21; 13	21; 11

==== Germany vs Austria ====
Germany
4
Centre Sportif Regional d'Alsace, Court 6
8 April 2017, 18:00 UTC+2

Austria
1

			1	2	3
1	(Germany) (Austria)	Lukas Resch; Nicolas Rudolf	21; 17	16; 21	21; 15
2	(Germany) (Austria)	Ann-Kathrin Spöri; Katharina Hochmeir	21; 18	21; 14
3	(Germany) (Austria)	Daniel Hess / Julian Voigt; Philip Birker / Jakob Sorger	21; 16	21; 11
4	(Germany) (Austria)	Annika Schreiber / Miranda Wilson; Serena Au Yeong / Katharina Hochmeir	21; 9	21; 23	17; 21
5	(Germany) (Austria)	Julian Voigt / Judith Petrikowski; Philip Birker / Nina Sorger	21; 12	21; 13

==== Germany vs Slovenia ====
Germany
3
Centre Sportif Regional d'Alsace, Court 2
9 April 2017, 14:00 UTC+2

Slovenia
2

			1	2	3
1	(Germany) (Slovenia)	Julian Voigt / Judith Petrikowski; Miha Ivančič / Petra Polanc	19; 21	21; 18	17; 21
2	(Germany) (Slovenia)	Samuel Hsiao; Miha Ivanič	13; 21	19; 21
3	(Germany) (Slovenia)	Ann-Kathrin Spöri; Nika Arih	21; 14	15; 21	21; 11
4	(Germany) (Slovenia)	Julian Voigt / Jan Colin Völker; Miha Ivančič / Miha Ivanič	21; 12	21; 16
5	(Germany) (Slovenia)	Emma Moszczynski / Miranda Wilson; Nika Arih / Petra Polanc	21; 16	21; 19

==== Austria vs Poland ====
Austria
0
Centre Sportif Regional d'Alsace, Court 4
9 April 2017, 14:00 UTC+2

Poland
5

			1	2	3
1	(Austria) (Poland)	Philipp Drexler; Michał Kikosicki	14; 21	22; 24
2	(Austria) (Poland)	Natalie Herbst; Wiktoria Dąbczyńska	14; 21	4; 21
3	(Austria) (Poland)	Philip Birker / Jakob Sorger; Robert Cybulski / Paweł Śmiłowski	18; 21	9; 21
4	(Austria) (Poland)	Serena Au Yeong / Katharina Hochmeir; Wiktoria Dąbczyńska / Aleksandra Goszczyńska	18; 21	15; 21
5	(Austria) (Poland)	Philip Birker / Nina Sorger; Paweł Śmiłowski / Magdalena Świerczyńska	11; 21	11; 21

=== Group 6 ===
Pos	Team	Pld	W	L	MF	MA	MD	GF	GA	GD	PF	PA	PD	Pts	Qualification	Netherlands	Spain	Scotland	Bulgaria	Portugal
1	Netherlands	4	3	1	12	8	+4	27	17	+10	810	748	+62	3	Advance to knockout stage	—	4–1	1–4	3–2	4–1
2	Spain	4	3	1	11	9	+2	22	20	+2	734	729	+5	3			—	3–2	3–2	4–1
3	Scotland	4	2	2	12	8	+4	28	18	+10	872	734	+138	2				—	1–4	5–0
4	Bulgaria	4	2	2	12	8	+4	26	20	+6	843	786	+57	2					—	4–1
5	Portugal	4	0	4	3	17	−14	7	35	−28	584	846	−262	0						—

Source: BWF

==== Spain vs Scotland ====
Spain
3
Centre Sportif Regional d'Alsace, Court 2
7 April 2017, 10:00 UTC+2

Scotland
2

			1	2	3
1	(Spain) (Scotland)	Clara Azurmendi; Holly Newall	21; 16	21; 9
2	(Spain) (Scotland)	Álvaro Vázquez; Alexander Dunn	21; 16	9; 21	21; 19
3	(Spain) (Scotland)	Clara Azurmendi / Sara Peñalver; Eleanor O'Donnell / Ciara Torrance	21; 14	21; 19
4	(Spain) (Scotland)	Pablo Alfayate / Bernat Amaya; Christopher Grimley / Matthew Grimley	10; 21	10; 21
5	(Spain) (Scotland)	Alejandro Alcalá / Sara Peñalver; Alexander Dunn / Eleanor O'Donnell	13; 21	12; 21

==== Portugal vs Bulgaria ====
Portugal
1
Centre Sportif Regional d'Alsace, Court 4
7 April 2017, 10:00 UTC+2

Bulgaria
4

			1	2	3
1	(Portugal) (Bulgaria)	Marco Jorge / Mariana Pinto Leite; Ivan Panev / Hristomira Popovska	9; 21	10; 21
2	(Portugal) (Bulgaria)	Miguel Rocha; Dimitar Yanakiev	21; 19	21; 13
3	(Portugal) (Bulgaria)	Adriana Gonçalves; Maria Delcheva	14; 21	18; 21
4	(Portugal) (Bulgaria)	Marco Jorge / Carlos André Silva; Daniel Nikolov / Ivan Panev	10; 21	9; 21
5	(Portugal) (Bulgaria)	Mariana Chang / Mariana Pinto Leite; Maria Delcheva / Hristomira Popovska	11; 21	12; 21

==== Spain vs Bulgaria ====
Spain
3
Centre Sportif Regional d'Alsace, Court 5
7 April 2017, 18:00 UTC+2

Bulgaria
2

			1	2	3
1	(Spain) (Bulgaria)	Alejandro Alcalá / Sara Peñalver; Ivan Panev / Hristomira Popovska	21; 13	21; 18
2	(Spain) (Bulgaria)	Álvaro Vázquez; Daniel Nikolov	16; 21	15; 21
3	(Spain) (Bulgaria)	Clara Azurmendi; Maria Delcheva	21; 9	21; 19
4	(Spain) (Bulgaria)	Alejandro Alcalá / Álvaro Vázquez; Daniel Nikolov / Ivan Panev	14; 21	18; 21
5	(Spain) (Bulgaria)	Clara Azurmendi / Sara Peñalver; Maria Delcheva / Hristomira Popovska	15; 21	21; 13	21; 14

==== Netherlands vs Scotland ====
Netherlands
1
Centre Sportif Regional d'Alsace, Court 6
7 April 2017, 18:00 UTC+2

Scotland
4

			1	2	3
1	(Netherlands) (Scotland)	Debora Jille; Holly Newall	21; 16	21; 19
2	(Netherlands) (Scotland)	Joran Kweekel; Alexander Dunn	18; 21	13; 21
3	(Netherlands) (Scotland)	Debora Jille / Imke van der Aar; Eleanor O'Donnell / Ciara Torrance	17; 21	21; 16	19; 21
4	(Netherlands) (Scotland)	Sebastiaan Li / Ties van der Lecq; Christopher Grimley / Matthew Grimley	9; 21	13; 21
5	(Netherlands) (Scotland)	Joran Kweekel / Imke van der Aar; Alexander Dunn / Eleanor O'Donnell	13; 21	15; 21

==== Portugal vs Netherlands ====
Portugal
1
Centre Sportif Regional d'Alsace, Court 5
8 April 2017, 11:00 UTC+2

Netherlands
4

			1	2	3
1	(Portugal) (Netherlands)	Miguel Rocha; Thomas Sibbald	18; 21	21; 19	21; 16
2	(Portugal) (Netherlands)	Mariana Chang; Madouc Linders	15; 21	16; 21
3	(Portugal) (Netherlands)	Marco Jorge / Carlos André Silva; Sebastiaan Li / Ties van der Lecq	12; 21	8; 21
4	(Portugal) (Netherlands)	Adriana Gonçalves / Mariana Pinto Leite; Debora Jille / Alyssa Tirtosentono	11; 21	13; 21
5	(Portugal) (Netherlands)	Carlos André Silva / Mariana Chang; Joran Kweekel / Imke van der Aar	8; 21	16; 21

==== Bulgaria vs Scotland ====
Bulgaria
4
Centre Sportif Regional d'Alsace, Court 6
8 April 2017, 11:00 UTC+2

Scotland
1

			1	2	3
1	(Bulgaria) (Scotland)	Ivan Panev / Hristomira Popovska; Alexander Dunn / Eleanor O'Donnell	16; 21	14; 21
2	(Bulgaria) (Scotland)	Mihaela Neycheva; Rachel Sugden	21; 18	15; 21	21; 17
3	(Bulgaria) (Scotland)	Dimitar Yanakiev; Alexander Dunn	19; 21	21; 13	9; 1	retired
4	(Bulgaria) (Scotland)	Maria Delcheva / Hristomira Popovska; Eleanor O'Donnell / Ciara Torrance	21; 17	16; 21	24; 22
5	(Bulgaria) (Scotland)	Daniel Nikolov / Ivan Panev; Christopher Grimley / Matthew Grimley	21; 19	21; 14

==== Portugal vs Scotland ====
Portugal
0
Centre Sportif Regional d'Alsace, Court 1
8 April 2017, 18:00 UTC+2

Scotland
5

			1	2	3
1	(Portugal) (Scotland)	Marco Jorge / Mariana Pinto Leite; Christopher Grimley / Ciara Torrance	7; 21	11; 21
2	(Portugal) (Scotland)	Carlos André Silva; Matthew Grimley	13; 21	8; 21
3	(Portugal) (Scotland)	Mariana Chang; Rachel Sugden	15; 21	21; 19	13; 21
4	(Portugal) (Scotland)	Marco Jorge / Carlos André Silva; Christopher Grimley / Ciar Pringle	15; 21	10; 21
5	(Portugal) (Scotland)	Adriana Gonçalves / Mariana Pinto Leite; Eleanor O'Donnell / Ciara Torrance	9; 21	13; 21

==== Spain vs Netherlands ====
Spain
1
Centre Sportif Regional d'Alsace, Court 2
8 April 2017, 18:00 UTC+2

Netherlands
4

			1	2	3
1	(Spain) (Netherlands)	Clara Azurmendi; Madouc Linders	21; 10	21; 7
2	(Spain) (Netherlands)	Álvaro Vázquez; Joran Kweekel	19; 21	10; 21
3	(Spain) (Netherlands)	Clara Azurmendi / Sara Peñalver; Debora Jille / Alyssa Tirtosentono	16; 21	16; 21
4	(Spain) (Netherlands)	Miguel Barbado / Álvaro Vázquez; Sebastiaan Li / Ties van der Lecq	19; 21	9; 21
5	(Spain) (Netherlands)	Alejandro Alcalá / Sara Peñalver; Joran Kweekel / Imke van der Aar	15; 21	11; 21

==== Netherlands vs Bulgaria ====
Netherlands
3
Centre Sportif Regional d'Alsace, Court 1
9 April 2017, 14:00 UTC+2

Bulgaria
2

			1	2	3
1	(Netherlands) (Bulgaria)	Joran Kweekel / Imke van der Aar; Ivan Panev / Hristomira Popovska	21; 9	21; 12
2	(Netherlands) (Bulgaria)	Madouc Linders; Maria Delcheva	21; 19	13; 21	21; 16
3	(Netherlands) (Bulgaria)	Joran Kweekel; Dimitar Yanakiev	14; 21	16; 21
4	(Netherlands) (Bulgaria)	Debora Jille / Imke van der Aar; Maria Delcheva / Hristomira Popovska	21; 16	21; 11
5	(Netherlands) (Bulgaria)	Sebastiaan Li / Ties van der Lecq; Daniel Nikolov / Ivan Panev	27; 25	10; 21	15; 21

==== Spain vs Portugal ====
Spain
4
Centre Sportif Regional d'Alsace, Court 3
9 April 2017, 14:00 UTC+2

Portugal
1

			1	2	3
1	(Spain) (Portugal)	Alejandro Alcalá / Clara Azurmendi; Marco Jorge / Mariana Pinto Leite	21; 12	21; 11
2	(Spain) (Portugal)	Miguel Barbado; Miguel Rocha	10; 21	15; 21
3	(Spain) (Portugal)	Sara Peñalver; Mariana Chang	21; 13	21; 12
4	(Spain) (Portugal)	Pablo Alfayate / Bernat Amaya; Marco Jorge / Carlos André Silva	21; 16	21; 13
5	(Spain) (Portugal)	Paula López / Laura Santos; Adriana F. Goncalves / Mariana Pinto Leite	21; 19	21; 17

== Knockout stage ==
=== Bracket ===
Quarter-finals
Denmark	3
Poland	2
Russia	3
Netherlands	0
Czech Republic	0
France	3
Germany	2
England	3

Semi-finals
Denmark	1
Russia	3
France	3
England	0

Final
Russia	0
France	3

=== Quarter-finals ===
==== Denmark vs Poland ====
Denmark
3
Centre Sportif Regional d'Alsace, Court 3
10 April 2017, 10:00 UTC+2

Poland
2

			1	2	3
1	(Denmark) (Poland)	Daniel Lundgaard / Alexandra Bøje; Paweł Śmiłowski / Magdalena Świerczyńska	13; 21	11; 21
2	(Denmark) (Poland)	Mads Thøgersen; Michał Kikosicki	21; 13	21; 12
3	(Denmark) (Poland)	Irina Amalie Andersen; Wiktoria Dąbczyńska	21; 14	21; 13
4	(Denmark) (Poland)	Daniel Lundgaard / Karl Thor Søndergaard; Robert Cybulski / Paweł Śmiłowski	26; 24	17; 21	17; 21
5	(Denmark) (Poland)	Alexandra Bøje / Julie Dawall Jakobsen; Wiktoria Dąbczyńska / Aleksandra Goszczyńska	21; 19	21; 10

==== Russia vs Netherlands ====
Russia
3
Centre Sportif Regional d'Alsace, Court 4
10 April 2017, 10:00 UTC+2

Netherlands
0

			1	2	3
1	(Russia) (Netherlands)	Rodion Alimov / Alina Davletova; Ties van der Lecq / Imke van der Aar	21; 14	21; 13
2	(Russia) (Netherlands)	Nikita Lemeshko; Joran Kweekel	21; 18	26; 24
3	(Russia) (Netherlands)	Anastasiia Pustinskaia; Madouc Linders	21; 11	21; 14
4	(Russia) (Netherlands)	Rodion Alimov / Pavel Kotsarenko; Sebastiaan Li / Ties van der Lecq				not played
5	(Russia) (Netherlands)	Alina Davletova / Anastasiia Semenova; Debora Jille / Alyssa Tirtosentono				not played

==== Czech Republic vs France ====
Czech Republic
0
Centre Sportif Regional d'Alsace, Court 1
10 April 2017, 10:00 UTC+2

France
3

			1	2	3
1	(Czech Republic) (France)	Jan Louda; Toma Junior Popov	16; 21	16; 21
2	(Czech Republic) (France)	Tereza Švábíková; Yaëlle Hoyaux	21; 23	15; 21
3	(Czech Republic) (France)	Petr Beran / Ondřej Král; Thom Gicquel / Toma Junior Popov	14; 21	20; 22
4	(Czech Republic) (France)	Berta Ausbergerová / Bára Hadáčková; Vimala Hériau / Léonice Huet				not played
5	(Czech Republic) (France)	Ondřej Král / Tereza Švábíková; Thom Gicquel / Delphine Delrue				not played

==== Germany vs England ====
Germany
2
Centre Sportif Regional d'Alsace, Court 2
10 April 2017, 10:00 UTC+2

England
3

			1	2	3
1	(Germany) (England)	Jan Colin Völker / Emma Moszczynski; Max Flynn / Lizzie Tolman	24; 22	20; 22	21; 17
2	(Germany) (England)	Samuel Hsiao; David Jones	21; 9	20; 22	18; 21
3	(Germany) (England)	Yvonne Li; Abigail Holden	13; 21	21; 9	22; 20
4	(Germany) (England)	Julian Voigt / Jan Colin Völker; Max Flynn / Callum Hemming	14; 21	18; 21
5	(Germany) (England)	Emma Moszczynski / Miranda Wilson; Fee Teng Liew / Lizzie Tolman	13; 21	16; 21

=== Semi-finals ===
==== Denmark vs Russia ====
Denmark
1
Centre Sportif Regional d'Alsace, Court 1
10 April 2017, 17:00 UTC+2

Russia
3

			1	2	3
1	(Denmark) (Russia)	Emil Hybel / Amalie Magelund; Rodion Alimov / Alina Davletova	13; 21	18; 21
2	(Denmark) (Russia)	Mads Thøgersen; Georgii Karpov	15; 21	18; 21
3	(Denmark) (Russia)	Julie Dawall Jakobsen; Anastasiia Shapovalova	21; 15	21; 11
4	(Denmark) (Russia)	Daniel Lundgaard / Karl Thor Søndergaard; Rodion Alimov / Pavel Kotsarenko	16; 21	21; 18	9; 21
5	(Denmark) (Russia)	Alexandra Bøje / Julie Dawall Jakobsen; Alina Davletova / Anastasiia Semenova				not played

==== France vs England ====
France
3
Centre Sportif Regional d'Alsace, Court 2
10 April 2017, 17:00 UTC+2

England
0

			1	2	3
1	(France) (England)	Thom Gicquel / Delphine Delrue; Callum Hemming / Fee Teng Liew	21; 15	21; 18
2	(France) (England)	Toma Junior Popov; David Jones	21; 11	21; 14
3	(France) (England)	Yaëlle Hoyaux; Abigail Holden	21; 19	21; 12
4	(France) (England)	Thom Gicquel / Léo Rossi; Max Flynn / Callum Hemming				not played
5	(France) (England)	Delphine Delrue / Vimala Hériau; Fee Teng Liew / Lizzie Tolman				not played

=== Final ===
==== Russia vs France ====
Russia
0
Centre Sportif Regional d'Alsace, Court 1
11 April 2017, 10:00 UTC+2

France
3

			1	2	3
1	(Russia) (France)	Rodion Alimov / Alina Davletova; Thom Gicquel / Delphine Delrue	21; 19	14; 21	14; 21
2	(Russia) (France)	Georgii Karpov; Toma Junior Popov	16; 21	16; 21
3	(Russia) (France)	Anastasiia Shapovalova; Yaëlle Hoyaux	18; 21	19; 21
4	(Russia) (France)	Rodion Alimov / Pavel Kotsarenko; Thom Gicquel / Toma Junior Popov				not played
5	(Russia) (France)	Alina Davletova / Anastasiia Semenova; Delphine Delrue / Vimala Hériau				not played
