= 2016 BWF World Junior Championships – Teams event =

2016 BWF World Junior Championships
Tournament details
- Dates: 2–6 November 2016
- Edition: 18th
- Level: International
- Nations: 52
- Venue: Bilbao Arena
- Location: Bilbao, Biscay, Spain

The Teams event of the tournament 2016 BWF World Junior Championships is held on November 2–6. The defending champions were China, who defeated Indonesia in the previous edition.

China won the cup after defeating Malaysia 3–0 in the final.

== Group stage ==
=== Group A ===
==== Group A1 ====
Pos	Team	Pld	W	L	MW	ML	GW	GL	PW	PL	Pts	Qualification
1	China	2	2	0	10	0	20	0	420	156	4	Play-off A1
2	Canada	2	1	1	5	5	10	10	320	271	2	Play-off A2
3	Armenia	2	0	2	0	10	0	20	107	420	0	Play-off A3

==== Group A2 ====
Pos	Team	Pld	W	L	MW	ML	GW	GL	PW	PL	Pts	Qualification
1	England	2	2	0	7	3	17	6	435	357	4	Play-off A1
2	Australia	2	1	1	5	5	10	13	383	405	2	Play-off A2
3	Scotland	2	0	2	3	7	8	16	398	454	0	Play-off A3

==== Group A play-offs ====
Play-off A1
China	3
England	0

Play-off A2
Canada	3
Australia	1

Play-off A3
Armenia	0
Scotland	3

=== Group B ===
==== Group B1 ====
Pos	Team	Pld	W	L	MW	ML	GW	GL	PW	PL	Pts	Qualification
1	Poland	2	2	0	8	2	16	5	410	323	4	Play-off B1
2	Belgium	2	1	1	5	5	11	11	388	369	2	Play-off B2
3	Romania	2	0	2	2	8	5	16	313	419	0	Play-off B3

==== Group B2 ====
Pos	Team	Pld	W	L	MW	ML	GW	GL	PW	PL	Pts	Qualification
1	Chinese Taipei	3	3	0	14	1	28	3	634	400	6	Play-off B1
2	Russia	3	2	1	11	4	23	9	627	483	4	Play-off B2
3	Hungary	3	1	2	5	10	10	20	470	567	2	Play-off B3
4	Moldova	3	0	3	0	15	1	30	370	651	0	Final Stage 49th to 52nd

==== Group B play-offs ====
Play-off B1
Poland	1
Chinese Taipei	3

Play-off B2
Belgium	1
Russia	3

Play-off B3
Romania	0
Hungary	3

=== Group C ===
==== Group C1 ====
Pos	Team	Pld	W	L	MW	ML	GW	GL	PW	PL	Pts	Qualification
1	Japan	2	2	0	10	0	20	0	420	150	4	Play-off C1
2	New Zealand	2	1	1	5	5	10	10	312	345	2	Play-off C2
3	South Africa	2	0	2	0	10	0	20	185	422	0	Play-off C3

==== Group C2 ====
Pos	Team	Pld	W	L	MW	ML	GW	GL	PW	PL	Pts	Qualification
1	Singapore	3	3	0	13	2	26	4	594	330	6	Play-off C1
2	Hong Kong	3	2	1	12	3	24	6	579	289	4	Play-off C2
3	Peru	3	1	2	5	10	10	20	406	485	2	Play-off C3
4	Georgia	3	0	3	0	15	0	30	155	630	0	Final Stage 49th to 52nd

==== Group C play-offs ====
Play-off C1
Japan	3
Singapore	0

Play-off C2
New Zealand	0
Hong Kong	3

Play-off C3
South Africa	0
Peru	3

=== Group D ===
==== Group D1 ====
Pos	Team	Pld	W	L	MW	ML	GW	GL	PW	PL	Pts	Qualification
1	United States	2	2	0	9	1	18	3	413	315	4	Play-off D1
2	Slovenia	2	1	1	6	4	13	8	386	315	2	Play-off D2
3	Iceland	2	0	2	0	10	0	20	251	420	0	Play-off D3

==== Group D2 ====
Pos	Team	Pld	W	L	MW	ML	GW	GL	PW	PL	Pts	Qualification
1	Denmark	2	2	0	9	1	19	2	431	250	4	Play-off D1
2	Macau	2	1	1	3	7	8	15	347	430	2	Play-off D2
3	Latvia	2	0	2	3	7	7	17	369	467	0	Play-off D3
4	Ghana	0	0	0	0	0	0	0	0	0	0	Withdrew

==== Group D play-offs ====
Play-off D1
United States	0
Denmark	3

Play-off D2
Slovenia	3
Macau	0

Play-off D3
Iceland	1
Latvia	3

=== Group E ===
==== Group E1 ====
Pos	Team	Pld	W	L	MW	ML	GW	GL	PW	PL	Pts	Qualification
1	Malaysia	1	1	0	5	0	10	0	210	76	2	Play-off E1
2	Mexico	1	0	1	0	5	0	10	76	210	0	Play-off E2
3	Zambia	0	0	0	0	0	0	0	0	0	0	Withdrew

==== Group E2 ====
Pos	Team	Pld	W	L	MW	ML	GW	GL	PW	PL	Pts	Qualification
1	Czech Republic	3	3	0	14	1	28	2	628	288	6	Play-off E1
2	Belarus	3	2	1	8	7	16	14	526	479	4	Play-off E2
3	Lithuania	3	1	2	7	8	14	16	446	526	2	Final Stage 33rd to 40th
4	Mongolia	3	0	3	1	14	2	28	316	623	0	Final Stage 41st to 48th

==== Group E play-offs ====
Play-off E1
Malaysia	3
Czech Republic	0

Play-off E2
Mexico	2
Belarus	3

=== Group F ===
==== Group F1 ====
Pos	Team	Pld	W	L	MW	ML	GW	GL	PW	PL	Pts	Qualification
1	Indonesia	2	2	0	9	1	19	2	431	231	4	Play-off F1
2	Spain	2	1	1	4	6	8	14	366	416	2	Play-off F2
3	Norway	2	0	2	2	8	5	16	286	436	0	Play-off F3

==== Group F2 ====
Pos	Team	Pld	W	L	MW	ML	GW	GL	PW	PL	Pts	Qualification
1	South Korea	3	3	0	15	0	30	0	630	231	6	Play-off F1
2	Sweden	3	2	1	10	5	20	11	553	437	4	Play-off F2
3	Sri Lanka	3	1	2	5	10	11	21	432	606	2	Play-off F3
4	Algeria	3	0	3	0	15	1	30	307	648	0	Final Stage 49th to 52nd

==== Group F play-offs ====
Play-off F1
Indonesia	3
South Korea	0

Play-off F2
Spain	1
Sweden	3

Play-off F3
Norway	2
Sri Lanka	3

=== Group G ===
==== Group G1 ====
Pos	Team	Pld	W	L	MW	ML	GW	GL	PW	PL	Pts	Qualification
1	France	2	2	0	9	1	18	3	429	198	4	Play-off G1
2	Estonia	2	1	1	6	4	13	8	353	315	2	Play-off G2
3	Costa Rica	2	0	2	0	10	0	20	151	420	0	Play-off G3

==== Group G2 ====
Pos	Team	Pld	W	L	MW	ML	GW	GL	PW	PL	Pts	Qualification
1	India	3	3	0	15	0	30	3	680	447	6	Play-off G1
2	Netherlands	3	2	1	9	6	21	13	635	528	4	Play-off G2
3	Bulgaria	3	1	2	5	10	11	21	484	614	2	Play-off G3
4	Finland	3	0	3	1	14	3	28	423	633	0	Final Stage 49th to 52nd

==== Group G play-offs ====
Play-off G1
France	0
India	3

Play-off G2
Estonia	0
Netherlands	3

Play-off G3
Costa Rica	0
Bulgaria	3

=== Group H ===
==== Group H1 ====
Pos	Team	Pld	W	L	MW	ML	GW	GL	PW	PL	Pts	Qualification
1	Thailand	2	2	0	10	0	20	0	420	207	4	Play-off H1
2	Ukraine	2	1	1	5	5	10	12	365	388	2	Play-off H2
3	Slovakia	2	0	2	0	10	2	20	269	459	0	Play-off H3

==== Group H2 ====
Pos	Team	Pld	W	L	MW	ML	GW	GL	PW	PL	Pts	Qualification
1	Germany	2	2	0	10	0	20	0	420	217	4	Play-off H1
2	Portugal	2	1	1	5	5	10	10	317	328	2	Play-off H2
3	Faroe Islands	2	0	2	0	10	0	20	228	420	0	Play-off H3

==== Group H play-offs ====
Play-off H1
Thailand	3
Germany	0

Play-off H2
Ukraine	3
Portugal	0

Play-off H3
Slovakia	3
Faroe Islands	1

== Final stage ==
=== 1st to 8th ===
5th–6th place match
B	Chinese Taipei	1
F	Indonesia	3
7th–8th place match
D	Denmark	3
G	India	2

5th to 8th semifinals
B	Chinese Taipei	3
D	Denmark	0
F	Indonesia	3
G	India	0

1st to 8th quarterfinals
A	China	3
B	Chinese Taipei	0
C	Japan	3
D	Denmark	0
E	Malaysia	3
F	Indonesia	1
G	India	2
H	Thailand	3

1st to 4th semifinals
A	China	3
C	Japan	0
E	Malaysia	3
H	Thailand	1

Final
A	China	3
E	Malaysia	0
Third place
C	Japan	np
H	Thailand

==== 1st to 8th quarterfinals ====
China
3
Bilbao Arena, Court 7
4 November 2016
12:00

Chinese Taipei
0

			1	2	3
1	(China) (Chinese Taipei)	He Jiting / Du Yue; Su Li-wei / Hu Ling-fang	21; 16	21; 7
2	(China) (Chinese Taipei)	Liu Haichao; Lee Chia-hao	21; 17	21; 16
3	(China) (Chinese Taipei)	Han Chengkai / Zhou Haodong; Lin Sheng-chieh / Lu Chen	21; 13	21; 16
4	(China) (Chinese Taipei)	Chen Yufei; Jhou Shih-jyun				not played
5	(China) (Chinese Taipei)	Fu Xue / Xu Ya; Hu Ling-fang / Lee Chih-chen				not played

Japan
3
Bilbao Arena, Court 5
4 November 2016
19:00

Denmark
0

			1	2	3
1	(Japan) (Denmark)	Hiroki Okamura / Nami Matsuyama; Daniel Lundgaard / Amalie Magelund	21; 11	21; 19
2	(Japan) (Denmark)	Koki Watanabe; Mads Muurholm	21; 4	21; 11
3	(Japan) (Denmark)	Natsuki Nidaira; Line Christophersen	23; 25	21; 17	21; 9
4	(Japan) (Denmark)	Hiroki Okamura / Masayuki Onodera; Daniel Lundgaard / Mads Muurholm				not played
5	(Japan) (Denmark)	Sayaka Hobara / Nami Matsuyama; Line Christophersen / Mathilde Cramer				not played

Malaysia
3
Bilbao Arena, Court 6
4 November 2016
19:00

Indonesia
1

			1	2	3
1	(Malaysia) (Indonesia)	Ooi Zi Heng / Pearly Tan; Rinov Rivaldy / Apriani Rahayu	21; 18	14; 21	14; 21
2	(Malaysia) (Indonesia)	Lee Zii Jia; Chico Aura Dwi Wardoyo	21; 15	21; 11
3	(Malaysia) (Indonesia)	Goh Jin Wei; Gregoria Mariska Tunjung	21; 15	21; 14
4	(Malaysia) (Indonesia)	Chen Tang Jie / Man Wei Chong; Muhammad Fachrikar / Bagas Maulana	21; 19	21; 17
5	(Malaysia) (Indonesia)	Goh Jin Wei / Thinaah Muralitharan; Tania Oktaviani Kusumah / Apriani Rahayu				not played

India
2
Bilbao Arena, Court 7
4 November 2016
19:00

Thailand
3

			1	2	3
1	(India) (Thailand)	Mahima Aggarwal / Satwiksairaj Rankireddy; Pakin Kuna-Anuvit / Kwanchanok Sudjaipraparat	21; 15	21; 16
2	(India) (Thailand)	Lakshya Sen; Kantaphon Wangcharoen	17; 21	20; 22
3	(India) (Thailand)	Krishna Prasad Garaga / Satwiksairaj Rankireddy; Warit Sarapat / Panachai Worasaktayanan	21; 15	21; 16
4	(India) (Thailand)	Aakarshi Kashyap; Pornpawee Chochuwong	9; 21	10; 21
5	(India) (Thailand)	Mahima Aggarwal / Mithula U. K. Ruethaichanok Laisuan / Alisa Sapniti	19; 21	18; 21

==== 5th to 8th semifinals ====
Chinese Taipei
3
Bilbao Arena, Court 2
5 November 2016
15:30

Denmark
0

			1	2	3
1	(Chinese Taipei) (Denmark)	Chen Min-hsin / Hu Ling-fang; Irina Amalie Andersen / Rasmus Kjær	23; 21	21; 19
2	(Chinese Taipei) (Denmark)	Chen Shiau-cheng; Mads Muurholm	21; 6	21; 10
3	(Chinese Taipei) (Denmark)	Lin Sheng-chieh / Lu Chen; Rasmus Kjær / Jesper Toft	27; 25	21; 14
4	(Chinese Taipei) (Denmark)	Jhou Shih-jyun; Julie Dawall Jakobsen				not played
5	(Chinese Taipei) (Denmark)	Hu Ling-fang / Lee Chih-Chen; Alexandra Bøje / Freja Ravn				not played

Indonesia
3
Bilbao Arena, Court 3
5 November 2016
15:30

India
0

			1	2	3
1	(Indonesia) (India)	Muhammad Fachrikar / Bagas Maulana; Krishna Prasad Garaga / Dhruv Kapila	21; 14	21; 14
2	(Indonesia) (India)	Aurum Oktavia Winata; Shikha Gautam	21; 11	21; 18
3	(Indonesia) (India)	Chico Aura Dwi Wardoyo; Mithun Manjunath	16; 21	21; 17	21; 16
4	(Indonesia) (India)	Mychelle Crhystine Bandaso / Serena Kani; Ashwini Bhat K. / Mithula U. K.				not played
5	(Indonesia) (India)	Ramadiansyah Andika / Vania Arianti Sukoco; Kuhoo Garg / Satwiksairaj Rankireddy				not played

==== 1st to 4th semifinals ====
China
3
Bilbao Arena, Court 2
5 November 2016
19:00

Japan
0

			1	2	3
1	(China) (Japan)	He Jiting / Du Yue; Nami Matsuyama / Hiroki Okamura	21; 17	21; 16
2	(China) (Japan)	Sun Feixiang; Koki Watanabe	9; 21	21; 10	21; 17
3	(China) (Japan)	Han Chengkai / Zhou Haodong; Hiroki Okamura / Masayuki Onodera	21; 19	21; 12
4	(China) (Japan)	Chen Yufei; Natsuki Nidaira				not played
5	(China) (Japan)	Du Yue / Xu Ya; Sayaka Hobara / Nami Matsuyama				not played

Malaysia
3
Bilbao Arena, Court 1
5 November 2016
19:00

Thailand
1

			1	2	3
1	(Malaysia) (Thailand)	Ooi Zi Heng / Pearly Tan Koong Le; Pakin Kuna-Anuvit / Ruethaichanok Laisuan	22; 20	20; 22	12; 21
2	(Malaysia) (Thailand)	Lee Zii Jia; Kantaphon Wangcharoen	21; 18	21; 13
3	(Malaysia) (Thailand)	Goh Jin Wei; Pornpawee Chochuwong	21; 12	21; 15
4	(Malaysia) (Thailand)	Chen Tang Jie / Man Wei Chong; Warit Sarapat / Panachai Worasaktayanan	21; 18	21; 12
5	(Malaysia) (Thailand)	Goh Jin Wei / Thinaah Muralitharan; Ruethaichanok Laisuan / Alisa Sapniti				not played

==== 7th–8th place match ====
Denmark
3
Bilbao Arena, Court 10
6 November 2016
08:30

India
2

			1	2	3
1	(Denmark) (India)	Alexandra Bøje / Rasmus Kjær; Mahima Aggarwal / Satwiksairaj Rankireddy	16; 21	20; 22
2	(Denmark) (India)	Jesper Toft; Lakshya Sen	16; 21	11; 21
3	(Denmark) (India)	Julie Dawall Jakobsen; Aakarshi Kashyap	21; 15	21; 12
4	(Denmark) (India)	Rasmus Kjær / Jesper Toft; Krishna Prasad Garaga / Satwiksairaj Rankireddy	21; 19	14; 21	21; 18
5	(Denmark) (India)	Julie Dawall Jakobsen / Amalie Magelund; Mahima Aggarwal / Mithula U. K.	21; 14	19; 21	21; 16

==== 5th–6th place match ====
Chinese Taipei
1
Bilbao Arena, Court 9
6 November 2016
08:30

Indonesia
3

			1	2	3
1	(Chinese Taipei) (Indonesia)	Chen Min-hsin / Hu Ling-fang; Apriani Rahayu / Rinov Rivaldy	15; 21	21; 21
2	(Chinese Taipei) (Indonesia)	Lee Chia-hao; Chico Aura Dwi Wardoyo	21; 15	20; 22	21; 13
3	(Chinese Taipei) (Indonesia)	Su Li-wei / Ye Hong-wei; Ramadiansyah Andika / Rinov Rivaldy	16; 21	18; 21
4	(Chinese Taipei) (Indonesia)	Jhou Shih-jyun; Gregoria Mariska	9; 21	21; 19	10; 21
5	(Chinese Taipei) (Indonesia)	Hu Ling-fang / Lee Chih-Chen; Tania Oktaviani Kusumah / Apriani Rahayu				not played

==== Final ====
China
3
Bilbao Arena, Court 1
6 November 2016
14:00

Malaysia
0

			1	2	3
1	(China) (Malaysia)	He Jiting / Du Yue; Chen Tang Jie / Thinaah Muralitharan	17; 21	21; 13	21; 12
2	(China) (Malaysia)	Sun Feixiang; Leong Jun Hao	21; 15	21; 13
3	(China) (Malaysia)	Chen Yufei; Goh Jin Wei	22; 20	14; 21	21; 8
4	(China) (Malaysia)	Han Chengkai / Zhou Haodong; Hoo Pang Ron / Ameer Amri Zainuddin				not played
5	(China) (Malaysia)	Du Yue / Xu Ya; Goh Jin Wei / Thinaah Muralitharan				not played

=== 9th to 16th ===
13th–14th place match
D	United States	0
H	Germany	3
15th–16th place match
B	Poland	3
E	Czech Republic	1

13th to 16th semifinals
B	Poland	1
D	United States	3
E	Czech Republic	2
H	Germany	3

9th to 16th quarterfinals
A	England	3
B	Poland	0
C	Singapore	3
D	United States	0
E	Czech Republic	1
F	South Korea	3
G	France	3
H	Germany	2

9th to 12th semifinals
A	England	0
C	Singapore	3
F	South Korea	3
G	France	0

9th–10th place match
C	Singapore	0
F	South Korea	3
11th–12th place match
A	England	0
G	France	3

==== 9th to 16th quarterfinals ====
England
3
Bilbao Arena, Court 6
4 November 2016
12:00

Poland
0

			1	2	3
1	(England) (Poland)	Callum Hemming / Fee Teng Liew; Paweł Śmiłowski / Magdalena Świerczyńska	21; 10	21; 23	21; 16
2	(England) (Poland)	David Jones; Michal Kikosicki	21; 9	21; 7
3	(England) (Poland)	Abigail Holden; Wiktoria Dabczynska	21; 23	21; 10	21; 14
4	(England) (Poland)	Max Flynn / David Jones; Robert Cybulski / Paweł Śmiłowski				not played
5	(England) (Poland)	Fee Teng Liew / Miu Lin Ngan; Wiktoria Dabczynska / Aleksandra Goszczynska				not played

Singapore
3
Bilbao Arena, Court 2
4 November 2016
19:00

United States
0

			1	2	3
1	(Singapore) (United States)	Andy Kwek Jun Liang / Crystal Wong Jia Ying; Vinson Chiu / Jamie Hsu	21; 10	21; 16
2	(Singapore) (United States)	Ryan Ng Zin Rei; Joseph Pitman	21; 14	21; 5
3	(Singapore) (United States)	Andy Kwek Jun Liang / Lee Jian Liang; Vinson Chiu / Brian Duong	21; 16	21; 10
4	(Singapore) (United States)	Nur Insyirah Khan; Jennie Gai				not played
5	(Singapore) (United States)	Ker'Sara Koh / Crystal Wong Jia Ying; Karen Ma / Cindy Yuan				not played

Czech Republic
1
Bilbao Arena, Court 3
4 November 2016
19:00

South Korea
3

			1	2	3
1	(Czech Republic) (South Korea)	Michaela Fuchsova / Jan Somerlík; Kim Won-ho / Lee Yu-rim	11; 21	6; 21
2	(Czech Republic) (South Korea)	Jan Louda; Kim Moon-jun	21; 14	19; 21	21; 18
3	(Czech Republic) (South Korea)	Petr Beran / Ondřej Král; Kang Min-hyuk / Kim Won-ho	14; 21	10; 21
4	(Czech Republic) (South Korea)	Monika Svetnickova; Sim Yu-jin	15; 21	10; 21
5	(Czech Republic) (South Korea)	Michaela Fuchsova / Tereza Švábíková; Kim Ga-eun / Kim Hyang-im				not played

France
3
Bilbao Arena, Court 4
4 November 2016
19:00

Germany
2

			1	2	3
1	(France) (Germany)	Thom Gicquel / Delphine Delrue; Judith Petrikowski / Jan Colin Völker	19; 21	21; 13	21; 6
2	(France) (Germany)	Arnaud Merklé; Samuel Hsiao	16; 21	16; 21
3	(France) (Germany)	Margot Lambert; Yvonne Li	14; 21	9; 21
4	(France) (Germany)	Thom Gicquel / Toma Junior Popov; Daniel Hess / Jan Colin Völker	21; 11	20; 22	21; 14
5	(France) (Germany)	Delphine Delrue / Vimala Hériau; Yvonne Li / Judith Petrikowski	23; 21	19; 21	21; 18

==== 13th to 16th semifinals ====
Poland
1
Bilbao Arena, Court 3
5 November 2016
12:00

United States
3

			1	2	3
1	(Poland) (United States)	Paweł Śmiłowski / Magdalena Świerczyńska; Vinson Chiu / Jamie Hsu	18; 21	21; 18	21; 12
2	(Poland) (United States)	Robert Cybulski; Yuteng Wu	11; 21	18; 21
3	(Poland) (United States)	Wiktoria Dabczynska; Jennie Gai	1; 21	10; 21
4	(Poland) (United States)	Robert Cybulski / Michal Kikosicki; Vinson Chiu / Brian Duong	12; 21	14; 21
5	(Poland) (United States)	Wiktoria Dabczynska / Aleksandra Goszczynska; Jennie Gai / Jamie Hsu				not played

Czech Republic
2
Bilbao Arena, Court 9
5 November 2016
12:00

Germany
3

			1	2	3
1	(Czech Republic) (Germany)	Michaela Fuchsova / Jan Somerlík; Judith Petrikowski / Jan Colin Völker	12; 21	21; 17	10; 21
2	(Czech Republic) (Germany)	Jan Louda; Samuel Hsiao	21; 12	21; 18
3	(Czech Republic) (Germany)	Petr Beran / Ondřej Král; Hauke Graalmann / Daniel Hess	21; 16	21; 18
4	(Czech Republic) (Germany)	Monika Svetnickova; Yvonne Li	7; 21	13; 21
5	(Czech Republic) (Germany)	Berta Ausbergerova / Michaela Fuchsova; Annika Schreiber / Miranda Wilson	15; 21	22; 24

==== 9th to 12th semifinals ====
England
0
Bilbao Arena, Court 10
5 November 2016
12:00

Singapore
3

			1	2	3
1	(England) (Singapore)	David Jones; Ryan Ng Zin Rei	21; 19	17; 21	6; 21
2	(England) (Singapore)	Miu Lin Ngan; Nur Insyirah Khan	22; 20	18; 21	15; 21
3	(England) (Singapore)	Callum Hemming / Johnnie Torjussen; Andy Kwek Jun Liang / Lee Jian Liang	15; 21	21; 17	17; 21
4	(England) (Singapore)	Fee Teng Liew / Miu Lin Ngan; Ker'Sara Koh / Crystal Wong Jia Ying				not played
5	(England) (Singapore)	David Jones / Fee Teng Liew; Andy Kwek Jun Liang / Crystal Wong Jia Ying				not played

South Korea
3
Bilbao Arena, Court 1
5 November 2016
15:30

France
0

			1	2	3
1	(South Korea) (France)	Park Kyung-hoon / Kim Hye-jeong; Delphine Delrue / Thom Gicquel	21; 11	21; 8
2	(South Korea) (France)	Son Seong-hyun; Toma Junior Popov	21; 14	21; 18
3	(South Korea) (France)	Kim Ga-eun; Yaëlle Hoyaux	21; 9	24; 24	21; 6
4	(South Korea) (France)	Lee Hong-sub / Lim Su-min; Toma Junior Popov / Leo Rossi				not played
5	(South Korea) (France)	Kim Hyang-im / Lee Yu-rim; Delphine Delrue / Vimala Hériau				not played

==== 15th–16th place match ====
Poland
3
Bilbao Arena, Court 4
6 November 2016
08:30

Czech Republic
1

			1	2	3
1	(Poland) (Czech Republic)	Paweł Śmiłowski / Magdalena Świerczyńska; Michaela Fuchsova / Jan Somerlík	21; 17	21; 12
2	(Poland) (Czech Republic)	Michal Kikosicki; Jan Louda	12; 21	5; 21
3	(Poland) (Czech Republic)	Wiktoria Dabczynska; Tereza Švábíková	19; 21	21; 17	21; 13
4	(Poland) (Czech Republic)	Robert Cybulski / Paweł Śmiłowski; Petr Beran / Ondřej Král	21; 18	21; 17
5	(Poland) (Czech Republic)	Wiktoria Dabczynska / Aleksandra Goszczynska; Michaela Fuchsova / Tereza Švábíková				not played

==== 13th–14th place match ====
United States
0
Bilbao Arena, Court 5
6 November 2016
08:30

Germany
3

			1	2	3
1	(United States) (Germany)	Vinson Chiu / Joseph Pitman; Hauke Graalmann / Jan Colin Völker	16; 21	17; 21
2	(United States) (Germany)	Jennie Gai; Yvonne Li	23; 21	15; 21	15; 21
3	(United States) (Germany)	Yuteng Wu; Lukas Resch	21; 19	12; 21	20; 22
4	(United States) (Germany)	Karen Ma / Cindy Yuan; Annika Schreiber / Miranda Wilson				not played
5	(United States) (Germany)	Vinson Chiu / James Hsu; Daniel Hess / Emma Moszczynski				not played

==== 11th–12th place match ====
England
0
Bilbao Arena, Court 6
6 November 2016
08:30

France
3

			1	2	3
1	(England) (France)	Callum Hemming / Fee Teng Liew; Eloi Adam / Vimala Hériau	18; 21	15; 21
2	(England) (France)	Johnnie Torjussen; Léo Rossi	18; 21	21; 14	18; 21
3	(England) (France)	Max Flynn / David Jones; Eloi Adam / Samy Corvee	16; 21	17; 21
4	(England) (France)	Abigail Holden; Léonice Huet				not played
5	(England) (France)	Fee Teng Liew / Miu Lin Ngan; Delphine Delrue / Margot Lambert				not played

==== 9th–10th place match ====
Singapore
0
Bilbao Arena, Court 7
6 November 2016
08:30

South Korea
3

			1	2	3
1	(Singapore) (South Korea)	Andy Kwek Jun Liang / Crystal Wong Jia Ying; Park Kyung-hoon / Kim Hye-jeong	13; 21	14; 21
2	(Singapore) (South Korea)	Ryan Ng Zin Rei; Son Seong-hyun	17; 21	13; 21
3	(Singapore) (South Korea)	Andy Kwek Jun Liang / Lee Jian Liang; Kang Min-hyuk / Kim Won-ho	8; 21	16; 21
4	(Singapore) (South Korea)	Nur Insyirah Khan; Sim Yu-jin				not played
5	(Singapore) (South Korea)	Ker'Sara Koh / Crystal Wong Jia Ying; Kim Ga-eun / Kim Hyang-im				not played

=== 17th to 24th ===
21st–22nd place match
B	Russia	3
H	Ukraine	2
23rd–24th place match
D	Slovenia	3
E	Belarus	0

21st to 24th semifinals
B	Russia	3
D	Slovenia	0
E	Belarus	0
H	Ukraine	3

17th to 24th quarterfinals
A	Canada	3
B	Russia	0
C	Hong Kong	3
D	Slovenia	1
E	Belarus	0
F	Sweden	3
G	Netherlands	3
H	Ukraine	2

17th to 20th semifinals
A	Canada	1
C	Hong Kong	3
F	Sweden	3
G	Netherlands	1

17th–18th place match
C	Hong Kong	3
F	Sweden	0
19th–20th place match
A	Canada	3
G	Netherlands	1

=== 25th to 32nd ===
29th–30th place match
B	Belgium	3
G	Estonia	1
31st–32nd place match
D	Macau	3
E	Mexico	0

29th to 32nd semifinals
B	Belgium	3
D	Macau	0
E	Mexico	0
G	Estonia	3

25th to 32nd quarterfinals
A	Australia	3
B	Belgium	1
C	New Zealand	3
D	Macau	2
E	Mexico	0
F	Spain	3
G	Estonia	1
H	Portugal	3

25th to 28th semifinals
A	Australia	3
C	New Zealand	2
F	Spain	3
H	Portugal	2

25th–26th place match
A	Australia	2
F	Spain	3
27th–28th place match
C	New Zealand	3
H	Portugal	1

=== 33rd to 40th ===
37th–38th place match
B	Hungary	3
H	Slovakia	1
39th–40th place match
D	Latvia	3
E	Lithuania	0

37th to 40th semifinals
B	Hungary	3
D	Latvia	0
E	Lithuania	1
H	Slovakia	3

33rd to 40th quarterfinals
A	Scotland	3
B	Hungary	2
C	Peru	3
D	Latvia	0
E	Lithuania	0
F	Sri Lanka	3
G	Bulgaria	3
H	Slovakia	0

33rd to 36th semifinals
A	Scotland	3
C	Peru	1
F	Sri Lanka	1
G	Bulgaria	3

33rd–34th place match
A	Scotland	0
G	Bulgaria	3
35th–36th place match
C	Peru	3
F	Sri Lanka	0

=== 41st to 48th ===
45th–46th place match
C	South Africa	3
E	Mongolia	0
47th–48th place match
A	Armenia	1
G	Costa Rica	3

45th to 48th semifinals
A	Armenia	0
C	South Africa	3
E	Mongolia	3
G	Costa Rica	1

41st to 48th quarterfinals
A	Armenia	0
B	Romania	3
C	South Africa	1
D	Iceland	3
E	Mongolia	0
F	Norway	3
G	Costa Rica	0
H	Faroe Islands	3

41st to 44th semifinals
B	Romania	3
D	Iceland	2
F	Norway	3
H	Faroe Islands	1

41st–42nd place match
B	Romania	3
F	Norway	1
43rd–44th place match
D	Iceland	3
H	Faroe Islands	2

=== 49th to 52nd ===
49th to 52nd semifinals
B	Moldova	3
C	Georgia	0
F	Algeria	1
G	Finland	3

49th–50th place match
B	Moldova	0
G	Finland	3
51st–52nd place match
C	Georgia	0
F	Algeria	3

== Final standings ==
1. China
2. Malaysia
3. Japan
3. Thailand
5. Indonesia
6. Chinese Taipei
7. Denmark
8. India
9. South Korea
10. Singapore
11. France
12. England
13. Germany
14. United States
15. Poland (Debut)
16. Czech Republic
17. Hong Kong
18. Sweden
19. Canada
20. Netherlands
21. Russia
22. Ukraine
23. Slovenia
24. Belarus (Debut)
25. Spain
26. Australia
27. New Zealand
28. Portugal (Debut)
29. Belgium
30. Estonia
31. Macau
32. Mexico
33. Bulgaria
34. Scotland
35. Peru
36. Sri Lanka
37. Hungary
38. Slovakia (Debut)
39. Latvia (Debut)
40. Lithuania (Debut)
41. Romania
42. Norway (Debut)
43. Iceland
44. Faroe Islands (Debut)
45. South Africa
46. Mongolia
47. Costa Rica
48. Armenia
49. Finland
50. Moldova (Debut)
51. Algeria (Debut)
52. Georgia (Debut)
