= 2021 European Badminton Championships =

Tournament details
- Dates: 27 April 2021 – 2 May 2021
- Competitors: 213 from 36 nations
- Venue: Palace of Sports
- Location: Kyiv, Ukraine

Champions
- Men's singles: (Denmark) Anders Antonsen
- Women's singles: (Spain) Carolina Marín
- Men's doubles: (Russia) Vladimir Ivanov (Russia) Ivan Sozonov
- Women's doubles: (Bulgaria) Gabriela Stoeva (Bulgaria) Stefani Stoeva
- Mixed doubles: (Russia) Rodion Alimov (Russia) Alina Davletova

The 2021 European Badminton Championships was the 28th tournament of the European Badminton Championships. It was held in Kyiv, Ukraine, from 27 April to 2 May 2021.

== Tournament ==
The 2021 European Badminton Championships was the 28th edition of the championships. This tournament was organized by Badminton Europe along with the local organizer Ukrainian Badminton Federation and sanctioned by the Badminton World Federation. This tournament being played for the first time in Ukraine.

The tournament consisted of men's (singles and doubles), women's (singles and doubles), and also mixed doubles.

=== Venue ===
The tournament was held at the Palace of Sports in Kyiv, Ukraine.

=== Point distribution ===
Below are tables with the point distribution for each phase of the tournament based on the BWF points system for the European Badminton Championships, which is equivalent to a Super 500 event.

Winner	Runner-up	3/4	5/8	9/16	17/32	33/64
9,200	7,800	6,420	5,040	3,600	2,220	880

== Medal summary ==
=== Medalists ===
Event	Gold	Silver	Bronze
Men's singles	(Denmark) Anders Antonsen	(Denmark) Viktor Axelsen	(Finland) Kalle Koljonen
Men's singles	(Denmark) Anders Antonsen	(Denmark) Viktor Axelsen	(Denmark) Hans-Kristian Vittinghus
Women's singles	(Spain) Carolina Marín	(Denmark) Line Christophersen	(Turkey) Neslihan Yiğit
Women's singles	(Spain) Carolina Marín	(Denmark) Line Christophersen	(Scotland) Kirsty Gilmour
Men's doubles	(Russia) Vladimir Ivanov (Russia) Ivan Sozonov	(Germany) Mark Lamsfuß (Germany) Marvin Emil Seidel	(Denmark) Kim Astrup (Denmark) Anders Skaarup Rasmussen
Men's doubles	(Russia) Vladimir Ivanov (Russia) Ivan Sozonov	(Germany) Mark Lamsfuß (Germany) Marvin Emil Seidel	(England) Marcus Ellis (England) Chris Langridge
Women's doubles	(Bulgaria) Gabriela Stoeva (Bulgaria) Stefani Stoeva	(England) Chloe Birch (England) Lauren Smith	(Denmark) Maiken Fruergaard (Denmark) Sara Thygesen
Women's doubles	(Bulgaria) Gabriela Stoeva (Bulgaria) Stefani Stoeva	(England) Chloe Birch (England) Lauren Smith	(Netherlands) Selena Piek (Netherlands) Cheryl Seinen
Mixed doubles	(Russia) Rodion Alimov (Russia) Alina Davletova	(England) Marcus Ellis (England) Lauren Smith	(Denmark) Mathias Christiansen (Denmark) Alexandra Bøje
Mixed doubles	(Russia) Rodion Alimov (Russia) Alina Davletova	(England) Marcus Ellis (England) Lauren Smith	(Germany) Mark Lamsfuß (Germany) Isabel Herttrich

=== Medal table ===
* Host nation (Ukraine)

Rank	Nation	Gold	Silver	Bronze	Total
1	Russia	2	0	0	2
2	Denmark	1	2	4	7
3	Bulgaria	1	0	0	1
3	Spain	1	0	0	1
5	England	0	2	1	3
6	Germany	0	1	1	2
7	Finland	0	0	1	1
7	Netherlands	0	0	1	1
7	Scotland	0	0	1	1
7	Turkey	0	0	1	1
Totals (10 entries)		5	5	10	20

== Participants ==
213 players from 36 nations will participate this championship.

Participants of 2021 European Badminton Championships
Nation	MS	WS	MD	WD	XD	Total	Players
Austria	1		1	1	2	5	5
Azerbaijan	1					1	1
Belarus		1		2		3	4
Belgium	1	1			1	3	4
Bulgaria	1	2		1		4	5
Croatia	1					1	1
Czech Republic	1	2	1	2	0.5	6.5	7
Denmark	4	4	3	3	2	16	22
England	1	1	3	1	1	7	10
Estonia	1	1	1	1	1	5	7
Finland	2		1		0.5	3.5	5
France	3	2	2	1	3	11	14
Germany	2	2	2	2	2	10	13
Hungary		1				1	1
Iceland	1					1	1
Ireland	1	1	1	1	2	6	8
Israel	1	1				2	2
Italy	1		1	1		3	5
Lithuania		1				1	1
Moldova	1	1				2	2
Netherlands	2	2	1	2.5	2	9.5	13
Norway			1	1	1	3	5
Poland			1		1	2	4
Portugal	1	1		1		3	3
Russia	2	1	1	2	2	8	12
Scotland		1	1	1	2	5	7
Serbia	1	1	1			3	4
Slovakia	1	1				2	2
Slovenia	1	1			1	3	2
Spain	2	2	1			5	6
Sweden	1	2			1	4	5
Cyprus			1			1	2
Wales			1			1	2
Switzerland	1	2		1.5		4.5	5
Turkey	1	2	1	1	1	6	8
Ukraine (H)	2	3	2	2	2	11	15
Total (36 NOCs)	39	40	28	28	28	163	213

== Men's singles ==
=== Seeds ===
1. (Denmark) Viktor Axelsen (final)
2. (Denmark) Anders Antonsen (champion)
3. (Denmark) Rasmus Gemke (quarter-finals)
4. (Denmark) Hans-Kristian Vittinghus (semi-finals)
5. (Netherlands) Mark Caljouw (quarter-finals)
6. (France) Brice Leverdez (quarter-finals)
7. (France) Toma Junior Popov (third round)
8. (France) Thomas Rouxel (quarter-finals)

=== Wild card ===
Badminton Europe (BEC) awarded a wild card entry to Danylo Bosniuk of Ukraine.

=== Finals ===
Semi-finals
1	(Denmark) Viktor Axelsen	21	21
(Finland) Kalle Koljonen	14	14
4	(Denmark) Hans-Kristian Vittinghus	14	17
2	(Denmark) Anders Antonsen	21	21

Final
1	(Denmark) Viktor Axelsen
2	(Denmark) Anders Antonsen	w	/	o

=== Top half ===
==== Section 1 ====
First Round
(Spain) P Abián
WC	(Ukraine) D Bosniuk	w	/	o

Second Round
1	(Denmark) V Axelsen	21	21
(Czech Republic) M Ludík	11	12
(Belgium) M Moreels	8	8
(Germany) M Weißkirchen	21	21
8	(France) T Rouxel	21	21
(Russia) V Malkov	15	13
(Slovenia) M Ivanič	10	17
WC	(Ukraine) D Bosniuk	21	21

Third Round
1	(Denmark) V Axelsen	21	21
(Germany) M Weißkirchen	12	11
8	(France) T Rouxel	21	21
WC	(Ukraine) D Bosniuk	12	11

Quarter-finals
1	(Denmark) V Axelsen	21	21
8	(France) T Rouxel	14	15

==== Section 2 ====
First Round
(Moldova) C Savin	10	8
(Netherlands) J Kweekel	21	21
(Portugal) B Atilano	21	21
(Serbia) L Milić	18	15

Second Round
3	(Denmark) R Gemke	21	21
(Estonia) R Must	13	14
(Azerbaijan) A R Dwicahyo	26	16	14
(Netherlands) J Kweekel	24	21	21
7	(France) T J Popov	21	21
(England) A Lane	9	13
(Finland) K Koljonen	21	21
(Portugal) B Atilano	18	7

Third Round
3	(Denmark) R Gemke	17	21	21
(Netherlands) J Kweekel	21	13	15
7	(France) T J Popov	12	17
(Finland) K Koljonen	21	21

Quarter-finals
3	(Denmark) R Gemke	15	19
(Finland) K Koljonen	21	21

=== Bottom half ===
==== Section 3 ====
First Round
(Israel) M Zilberman	21	21
(Spain) L E Peñalver	18	17
(Bulgaria) D Nikolov	22	14
(Republic of Ireland) N Nguyen	24	21

Second Round
(Israel) M Zilberman	20	16
(Sweden) F Burestedt	22	21
(Austria) L Wraber	10	11
5	(Netherlands) M Caljouw	21	21
(Republic of Ireland) N Nguyen	23	21
(Croatia) Z Đurkinjak	21	14
(Italy) F Caponio	17	19
4	(Denmark) H-K Vittinghus	21	21

Third Round
(Sweden) F Burestedt	13	21	17
5	(Netherlands) M Caljouw	21	16	21
(Republic of Ireland) N Nguyen	11	11
4	(Denmark) H-K Vittinghus	21	21

Quarter-finals
5	(Netherlands) M Caljouw	19	21	15
4	(Denmark) H-K Vittinghus	21	17	21

==== Section 4 ====
First Round
(Slovakia) M Dratva	21	9	9
(Finland) E Heino	14	21	21
(Switzerland) C Kirchmayr	21	21
(Iceland) K Gunnarsson	11	9

Second Round
(Finland) E Heino	1
(Ukraine) A Pochtarov	0^{r}
(Russia) S Sirant	21	19	13
6	(France) B Leverdez	17	21	21
(Switzerland) C Kirchmayr	21	19	15
(Turkey) E Lale	19	21	21
(Germany) K Schäfer	18	14
2	(Denmark) A Antonsen	21	21

Third Round
(Finland) E Heino	13	22	16
6	(France) B Leverdez	21	20	21
(Turkey) E Lale	21	10	12
2	(Denmark) A Antonsen	11	21	21

Quarter-finals
6	(France) B Leverdez	12	13
2	(Denmark) A Antonsen	21	21

== Women's singles ==
=== Seeds ===
1. (Spain) Carolina Marín (champion)
2. (Denmark) Mia Blichfeldt (withdrew)
3. (Germany) Yvonne Li (quarter-finals)
4. (Scotland) Kirsty Gilmour (semi-finals)
5. (Turkey) Neslihan Yiğit (semi-finals)
6. (Denmark) Line Kjærsfeldt (quarter-finals)
7. (Denmark) Line Christophersen (finalist)
8. (Belgium) Lianne Tan (quarter-finals)

=== Wild card ===
Badminton Europe (BEC) awarded a wild card entry to Anna Mikhalkova of Ukraine.

=== Finals ===
Semi-finals
1	(Spain) Carolina Marín	21	21
5	(Turkey) Neslihan Yiğit	18	9
4	(Scotland) Kirsty Gilmour	13	21	10
7	(Denmark) Line Christophersen	21	7	21

Final
1	(Spain) Carolina Marín	21	21
7	(Denmark) Line Christophersen	13	18

=== Top half ===
==== Section 1 ====
First Round
(Lithuania) V Fomkinaitė	w	/	o
(Estonia) K Kuuba
(Switzerland) J Stadelmann	21	15	17
(Ukraine) N Voytsekh	19	21	21

Second Round
1	(Spain) C Marín	21	21
(Belarus) A Cherniavskaya	2	11
(Netherlands) S de Visch Eijbergen	21	21
(Lithuania) V Fomkinaitė	11	5
6	(Denmark) L Kjærsfeldt	21	21
(Moldova) V Ginga	12	13
(Portugal) S Gonçalves	13	7
(Ukraine) N Voytsekh	21	21

Third Round
1	(Spain) C Marín	21	21
(Netherlands) S de Visch Eijbergen	12	11
6	(Denmark) L Kjærsfeldt	21	16	21
(Ukraine) N Voytsekh	12	21	11

Quarter-finals
1	(Spain) C Marín	w	/	o
6	(Denmark) L Kjærsfeldt

==== Section 2 ====
First Round
(Slovenia) P Polanc	18	9
(England) F Redfearn	21	21
(Russia) N Perminova	21	17	14
(Hungary) Á Kőrösi	15	21	21

Second Round
3	(Germany) Y Li	w	/	o
(France) Qi XF
(Sweden) A Pillai	21	20	14
(England) F Redfearn	16	22	21
5	(Turkey) N Yiğit	21	21
(Czech Republic) T Švábíková	13	13
(Bulgaria) M Mitsova	16	14
(Hungary) Á Kőrösi	21	21

Third Round
3	(Germany) Y Li	21	21
(England) F Redfearn	19	8
5	(Turkey) N Yiğit	21	21
(Hungary) Á Kőrösi	18	10

Quarter-finals
3	(Germany) Y Li	16	16
5	(Turkey) N Yiğit	21	21

=== Bottom half ===
==== Section 3 ====
First Round
(Sweden) R Kuhl	w	/	o
(Spain) C Azurmendi
(Slovakia) M Repiská	w	/	o
(Turkey) A Demirbağ

Second Round
(Sweden) R Kuhl	6	12
(Netherlands) G Mahulette	21	21
WC	(Ukraine) A Mikhalkova	6	10
8	(Belgium) L Tan	21	21
(Slovakia) M Repiská	10	14
(Bulgaria) L Zetchiri	21	21
(Switzerland) S Jaquet	10	15
4	(Scotland) K Gilmour	21	21

Third Round
(Netherlands) G Mahulette	22	9
8	(Belgium) L Tan	24	21
(Bulgaria) L Zetchiri	8	9
4	(Scotland) K Gilmour	21	21

Quarter-finals
8	(Belgium) L Tan	21	13	14
4	(Scotland) K Gilmour	18	21	21

==== Section 4 ====
First Round
(Republic of Ireland) R Darragh	13	21	21
(Serbia) M Sudimac	21	17	8
(Czech Republic) K Tomalová	15	12
(France) M Batomene	21	21

Second Round
(Republic of Ireland) R Darragh	14	18
(Israel) K Polikarpova	21	21
(Ukraine) M Ulitina	12	13
7	(Denmark) L Christophersen	21	21
(France) M Batomene	21	21
(Germany) M Wilson	11	11
(Denmark) J D Jakobsen	w	/	o
2	(Denmark) M Blichfeldt

Third Round
(Israel) K Polikarpova	10	11
7	(Denmark) L Christophersen	21	21
(France) M Batomene	17	11
(Denmark) J D Jakobsen	21	21

Quarter-finals
7	(Denmark) L Christophersen	21	21
(Denmark) J D Jakobsen	9	8

== Men's doubles ==
=== Seeds ===
1. (Denmark) Kim Astrup / Anders Skaarup Rasmussen (semi-finals)
2. (England) Marcus Ellis / Chris Langridge (semi-finals)
3. (Russia) Vladimir Ivanov / Ivan Sozonov (champions)
4. (England) Ben Lane / Sean Vendy (quarter-finals)
5. (Germany) Mark Lamsfuß / Marvin Emil Seidel (final)
6. (Germany) Jones Ralfy Jansen / Peter Käsbauer (quarter-finals)
7. (France) Christo Popov / Toma Junior Popov (quarter-finals)
8. (Denmark) Daniel Lundgaard / Mathias Thyrri (first round)

=== Finals ===
Semi-finals
1	(Denmark) Kim Astrup (Denmark) Anders Skaarup Rasmussen	21	17
5	(Germany) Mark Lamsfuß (Germany) Marvin Emil Seidel	23	21
3	(Russia) Vladimir Ivanov (Russia) Ivan Sozonov	21	21
2	(England) Marcus Ellis (England) Chris Langridge	15	10

Final
5	(Germany) Mark Lamsfuß (Germany) Marvin Emil Seidel
3	(Russia) Vladimir Ivanov (Russia) Ivan Sozonov	w	/	o

=== Top half ===
==== Section 1 ====
First Round
(Ukraine) G Beketov (Ukraine) M Makhnovskiy	w	/	o
(Spain) J Monroy (Spain) C Piris
7	(France) C Popov (France) T J Popov	21	21
(Turkey) M Capar (Turkey) E Sonmez	13	13
(Czech Republic) J Janáček (Czech Republic) T Švejda	9	11
(Netherlands) R Jille (Netherlands) T van der Lecq	21	21

Second Round
1	(Denmark) K Astrup (Denmark) A S Rasmussen	21	21
(Ukraine) G Beketov (Ukraine) M Makhnovskiy	4	9
7	(France) C Popov (France) T J Popov	12	21	21
(Netherlands) R Jille (Netherlands) T van der Lecq	21	12	11

Quarter-finals
1	(Denmark) K Astrup (Denmark) A S Rasmussen	21	19	21
7	(France) C Popov (France) T J Popov	12	21	9

==== Section 2 ====
First Round
(Italy) G Greco (Italy) K Strobl	21	21
(Serbia) I Bjelan (Serbia) A Doder	13	13
5	(Germany) M Lamsfuß (Germany) M E Seidel	21	21
(Wales) A Jones (Wales) A Stewart	5	7
(Scotland) C Grimley (Scotland) M Grimley	21	21
(Republic of Ireland) J Magee (Republic of Ireland) P Reynolds	11	13

Second Round
4	(England) B Lane (England) S Vendy	21	21
(Italy) G Greco (Italy) K Strobl	9	13
5	(Germany) M Lamsfuß (Germany) M E Seidel	16	21	21
(Scotland) C Grimley (Scotland) M Grimley	21	16	14

Quarter-finals
4	(England) B Lane (England) S Vendy	15	21	19
5	(Germany) M Lamsfuß (Germany) M E Seidel	21	17	21

=== Bottom half ===
==== Section 3 ====
First Round
(Cyprus) A Ioannou (Cyprus) C Temereas	8	6
(Finland) A Monnberg (Finland) J Paul	21	21
(England) M Clare (England) M Flynn	21	21	21
8	(Denmark) D Lundgaard (Denmark) M Thyrri	23	17	18
(Austria) P Birker (Austria) D Stipsits	21	25
(Ukraine) I Druzchenko (Ukraine) O Kolesnik	10	23

Second Round
(Finland) A Monnberg (Finland) J Paul	11	21	12
(England) M Clare (England) M Flynn	21	15	21
(Austria) P Birker (Austria) D Stipsits	11	6
3	(Russia) V Ivanov (Russia) I Sozonov	21	21

Quarter-finals
(England) M Clare (England) M Flynn	11	13
3	(Russia) V Ivanov (Russia) I Sozonov	21	21

==== Section 4 ====
First Round
(Norway) T Flåtten (Norway) V Rikheim	w	/	o
(Denmark) J Eipe (Denmark) R Kjær
(Poland) M Matusz (Poland) W Trecki	10	12
6	(Germany) J R Jansen (Germany) P Käsbauer	21	21
(Estonia) K Kaljurand (Estonia) R Käsner	9	16
(France) F Delrue (France) W Villeger	21	21

Second Round
(Norway) T Flåtten (Norway) V Rikheim	23	11	16
6	(Germany) J R Jansen (Germany) P Käsbauer	21	21	21
(France) F Delrue (France) W Villeger	18	21	16
2	(England) M Ellis (England) C Langridge	21	19	21

Quarter-finals
6	(Germany) J R Jansen (Germany) P Käsbauer	21	12	24
2	(England) M Ellis (England) C Langridge	16	21	26

== Women's doubles ==
=== Seeds ===
1. (Bulgaria) Gabriela Stoeva / Stefani Stoeva (champion)
2. (England) Chloe Birch / Lauren Smith (final)
3. (Denmark) Maiken Fruergaard / Sara Thygesen (semi-finals)
4. (Netherlands) Selena Piek / Cheryl Seinen (semi-finals)
5. (France) Émilie Lefel / Anne Tran (second round)
6. (Denmark) Alexandra Bøje / Mette Poulsen (quarter-finals)
7. (Denmark) Amalie Magelund / Freja Ravn (quarter-finals)
8. (Germany) Linda Efler / Isabel Herttrich (quarter-finals)

=== Wild card ===
Badminton Europe (BEC) awarded a wild card entry to Polina Buhrova and Mariia Stoliarenko of Ukraine.

=== Finals ===
Semi-finals
1	(Bulgaria) Gabriela Stoeva (Bulgaria) Stefani Stoeva	21	21
3	(Denmark) Maiken Fruergaard (Denmark) Sara Thygesen	16	10
4	(Netherlands) Selena Piek (Netherlands) Cheryl Seinen	18	16
2	(England) Chloe Birch (England) Lauren Smith	21	21

Final
1	(Bulgaria) Gabriela Stoeva (Bulgaria) Stefani Stoeva	21	21
2	(England) Chloe Birch (England) Lauren Smith	14	19

=== Top half ===
==== Section 1 ====
First Round
(Estonia) K-K Marran (Estonia) H Rüütel	18	21
(Russia) V Kozyreva (Russia) M Sukhova	21	23
7	(Denmark) A Magelund (Denmark) F Ravn	21	21
(Czech Republic) T Švábíková (Czech Republic) K Tomalová	16	13
(Austria) S Au Yeong (Austria) K Hochmeir	9	12
(Germany) A Jäger (Germany) S Küspert	21	21

Second Round
1	(Bulgaria) G Stoeva (Bulgaria) S Stoeva	21	21
(Russia) V Kozyreva (Russia) M Sukhova	5	10
7	(Denmark) A Magelund (Denmark) F Ravn	21	21
(Germany) A Jäger (Germany) S Küspert	14	9

Quarter-finals
1	(Bulgaria) G Stoeva (Bulgaria) S Stoeva	21	21
7	(Denmark) A Magelund (Denmark) F Ravn	12	17

==== Section 2 ====
First Round
(Norway) S F Jørgensen (Norway) N Syvertsen	13	8
(Netherlands) D Jille (Netherlands) A Tirtosentono	21	21
5	(France) É Lefel (France) A Tran	21	21
(Ukraine) A Prozorova (Ukraine) V Rudakova	8	10
(Belarus) J Bitsoukova (Belarus) M Viarbitskaya	13	17
(Switzerland) A Müller (Switzerland) J Stadelmann	21	21

Second Round
3	(Denmark) M Fruergaard (Denmark) S Thygesen	21	21
(Netherlands) D Jille (Netherlands) A Tirtosentono	11	14
5	(France) É Lefel (France) A Tran	16	21	19
(Switzerland) A Müller (Switzerland) J Stadelmann	21	7	21

Quarter-finals
3	(Denmark) M Fruergaard (Denmark) S Thygesen	21	21
(Switzerland) A Müller (Switzerland) J Stadelmann	16	14

=== Bottom half ===
==== Section 3 ====
First Round
WC	(Ukraine) P Buhrova (Ukraine) M Stoliarenko	21	21
(Republic of Ireland) K Frost (Republic of Ireland) M Ryan	17	19
(Belarus) A Cherniavskaya (Belarus) A Zaitsava	10	6
6	(Denmark) A Bøje (Denmark) M Poulsen	21	21
(Scotland) J MacPherson (Scotland) C Torrance	13	15
(Russia) A Akchurina (Russia) O Morozova	21	21

Second Round
WC	(Ukraine) P Buhrova (Ukraine) M Stoliarenko	16	15
6	(Denmark) A Bøje (Denmark) M Poulsen	21	21
(Russia) A Akchurina (Russia) O Morozova	6	10
4	(Netherlands) S Piek (Netherlands) C Seinen	21	21

Quarter-finals
6	(Denmark) A Bøje (Denmark) M Poulsen	21	19	12
4	(Netherlands) S Piek (Netherlands) C Seinen	17	21	21

==== Section 4 ====
First Round
(Italy) K Fink (Italy) Y Hamza	11	8
(Turkey) B Erçetin (Turkey) N İnci	21	21
(Switzerland) N Fankhauser (Netherlands) I Tabeling	13	17
8	(Germany) L Efler (Germany) I Herttrich	21	21
(Czech Republic) A Bášová (Czech Republic) M Fuchsová	21	21
(Portugal) A F Gonçalves (Portugal) S Gonçalves	17	10

Second Round
(Turkey) B Erçetin (Turkey) N İnci	20	21	16
8	(Germany) L Efler (Germany) I Herttrich	22	16	21
(Czech Republic) A Bášová (Czech Republic) M Fuchsová	4	6
2	(England) C Birch (England) L Smith	21	21

Quarter-finals
8	(Germany) L Efler (Germany) I Herttrich	10	14
2	(England) C Birch (England) L Smith	21	21

== Mixed doubles ==
=== Seeds ===
1. (England) Marcus Ellis / Lauren Smith (finalist)
2. (France) Thom Gicquel / Delphine Delrue (quarter-finals)
3. (Germany) Mark Lamsfuß / Isabel Herttrich (semifinals)
4. (Denmark) Mathias Christiansen / Alexandra Bøje (semifinals)
5. (Netherlands) Robin Tabeling / Selena Piek (quarter-finals)
6. (Russia) Rodion Alimov / Alina Davletova (champion)
7. (Republic of Ireland) Sam Magee / Chloe Magee (quarter-finals)
8. (France) Ronan Labar / Anne Tran (quarter-finals)

=== Wild card ===
Badminton Europe (BEC) awarded a wild card entry to Valeriy Atrashchenkov and Yelyzaveta Zharka of Ukraine.

=== Finals ===
Semi-finals
1	(England) Marcus Ellis (England) Lauren Smith	21	21
4	(Denmark) Mathias Christiansen (Denmark) Alexandra Bøje	17	19
3	(Germany) Mark Lamsfuß (Germany) Isabel Herttrich	22	14	22
6	(Russia) Rodion Alimov (Russia) Alina Davletova	20	21	24

Final
1	(England) Marcus Ellis (England) Lauren Smith	21	16	15
6	(Russia) Rodion Alimov (Russia) Alina Davletova	11	21	21

=== Top half ===
==== Section 1 ====
First Round
(Finland) A Kaisti (Czech Republic) A Bášová	21	21
(Austria) D Stipsits (Austria) S Au Yeong	16	16
7	(Republic of Ireland) S Magee (Republic of Ireland) C Magee	21	19	21
(Netherlands) T van der Lecq (Netherlands) D Jille	14	21	14
(Scotland) C Grimley (Scotland) E O'Donnell	21	21
(Norway) C C Mork (Norway) S F Jørgensen	17	17

Second Round
1	(England) M Ellis (England) L Smith	21	21
(Finland) A Kaisti (Czech Republic) A Bášová	17	18
7	(Republic of Ireland) S Magee (Republic of Ireland) C Magee	21	21
(Scotland) C Grimley (Scotland) E O'Donnell	16	15

Quarter-finals
1	(England) M Ellis (England) L Smith	21	21
7	(Republic of Ireland) S Magee (Republic of Ireland) C Magee	7	11

==== Section 2 ====
First Round
(Estonia) M Laanes (Estonia) H Rüütel	16	19
(Poland) P Śmiłowski (Poland) M Świerczyńska	21	21
8	(France) R Labar (France) A Tran	21	22
WC	(Ukraine) V Atrashchenkov (Ukraine) Y Zharka	13	20
(Germany) J R Jansen (Germany) K Ostermeyer	16	23	21
(Russia) E Dremin (Russia) E Dimova	21	21	10

Second Round
4	(Denmark) M Christiansen (Denmark) A Bøje	21	21
(Poland) P Śmiłowski (Poland) M Świerczyńska	17	13
8	(France) R Labar (France) A Tran	13	21	21
(Germany) J R Jansen (Germany) K Ostermeyer	21	13	19

Quarter-finals
4	(Denmark) M Christiansen (Denmark) A Bøje	12	21	21
8	(France) R Labar (France) A Tran	21	16	12

=== Bottom half ===
==== Section 3 ====
First Round
(Scotland) A Hall (Scotland) J MacPherson	19	18
(Denmark) N Nøhr (Denmark) A Magelund	21	21
(Slovenia) M Ivančič (Slovenia) P Polanc	12	11
5	(Netherlands) R Tabeling (Netherlands) S Piek	21	21
(Turkey) E Sonmez (Turkey) Z Erdem	18	21	21
(Austria) P Birker (Austria) K Hochmeir	21	19	10

Second Round
(Denmark) N Nøhr (Denmark) A Magelund	11	21	19
5	(Netherlands) R Tabeling (Netherlands) S Piek	21	16	21
(Turkey) E Sonmez (Turkey) Z Erdem	9	10
3	(Germany) M Lamsfuß (Germany) I Herttrich	21	21

Quarter-finals
5	(Netherlands) R Tabeling (Netherlands) S Piek	8	12
3	(Germany) M Lamsfuß (Germany) I Herttrich	21	21

==== Section 4 ====
First Round
(Belgium) J van Nieuwkerke (Belgium) L Jaques	21	21
(Ukraine) M Makhnovskiy (Ukraine) A Prozorova	11	11
(Sweden) M Z-Bexell (Sweden) T Sjöö	15	8
6	(Russia) R Alimov (Russia) A Davletova	21	21
(France) E Adam (France) M Lambert	21	21
(Republic of Ireland) P Reynolds (Republic of Ireland) R Darragh	17	16

Second Round
(Belgium) J van Nieuwkerke (Belgium) L Jaques	7	16
6	(Russia) R Alimov (Russia) A Davletova	21	21
(France) E Adam (France) M Lambert	9	12
2	(France) T Gicquel (France) D Delrue	21	21

Quarter-finals
6	(Russia) R Alimov (Russia) A Davletova	21	21
2	(France) T Gicquel (France) D Delrue	18	18
