= Maryna Ilyinskaya =

Ukrainian badminton player (born 1999)

Personal information
- Born: Maryna Sergeevna Ilyinskaya; 13 March 1999 (age 27)
- Height: 1.70 m (5 ft 7 in)
- Weight: 56 kg (123 lb)

Sport
- Country: Ukraine
- Sport: Badminton

Women's singles & doubles
- Highest ranking: 123 (WS 2 November 2017); 57 (WD 17 May 2018); 549 (XD) 13 October 2016)
- BWF profile
Medal record
Women's badminton
Representing Ukraine
European Junior Championships
Silver medal – second place	2017 Mulhouse	Girls' singles

Maryna Sergeevna Ilyinskaya (Ukrainian: Маріна Сергіївна Ільїнська; born 13 March 1999) is a Ukrainian badminton player from Kharkov badminton club. In 2017, she won the girls' singles silver medal at the European Junior Championships. She won her first senior international title at the 2017 Czech International tournament in the women's doubles event partnered with Yelyzaveta Zharka.

== Achievements ==
=== European Junior Championships ===
Girls' singles
Year	Venue	Opponent	Score	Result
2017	Centre Sportif Regional d'Alsace; Mulhouse, France	(Denmark) Julie Dawall Jakobsen	8–21, 17–21	Silver

=== BWF International Challenge/Series ===
Women's singles
Year	Tournament	Opponent	Score	Result
2017	Slovak Open	(Hungary) Laura Sarosi	12–21, 14–21	(silver) Runner-up
2017	Czech International	(Chinese Taipei) Lin Sih-yun	9–21, 11–21	(silver) Runner-up

Women's doubles
Year	Tournament	Partner	Opponent	Score	Result
2018	Spanish International	(Ukraine) Yelyzaveta Zharka	(France) Delphine Delrue (France) Léa Palermo	6–21, 12–21	(silver) Runner-up
2017	Turkey International	(Ukraine) Yelyzaveta Zharka	(Turkey) Bengisu Ercetin (Turkey) Nazlıcan Inci	13–21, 18–21	(silver) Runner-up
2017	Czech International	(Ukraine) Yelyzaveta Zharka	(Estonia) Kristin Kuuba (Estonia) Helina Rüütel	13–21, 21–19, 21–16	(gold) Winner

BWF International Challenge tournament
BWF International Series tournament
BWF Future Series tournament
