= 2017 European Junior Badminton Championships =

Tournament details
- Dates: 7 – 16 April 2017
- Venue: Centre Sportif Regional d'Alsace
- Location: Mulhouse, Grand Est, France

The 2017 European Junior Badminton Championships were held at the Centre Sportif Regional d'Alsace in Mulhouse, France, between 7 April - 16 April 2017.

== Medalists ==
Event	Gold	Silver	Bronze
Boys' singles	(France) Toma Junior Popov	(France) Arnaud Merklé	(England) David Jones
Boys' singles	(France) Toma Junior Popov	(France) Arnaud Merklé	(Netherlands) Joran Kweekel
Girls' singles	(Denmark) Julie Dawall Jakobsen	(Ukraine) Maryna Ilyinskaya	(Germany) Yvonne Li
Girls' singles	(Denmark) Julie Dawall Jakobsen	(Ukraine) Maryna Ilyinskaya	(Denmark) Irina Amalie Andersen
Boys' doubles	(France) Thom Gicquel (France) Toma Junior Popov	(England) Max Flynn (England) Callum Hemming	(Denmark) Daniel Lundgaard (Denmark) Jesper Toft
Boys' doubles	(France) Thom Gicquel (France) Toma Junior Popov	(England) Max Flynn (England) Callum Hemming	(Poland) Robert Cybulski (Poland) Paweł Śmiłowski
Girls' doubles	(Sweden) Emma Karlsson (Sweden) Johanna Magnusson	(Denmark) Alexandra Bøje (Denmark) Julie Dawall Jakobsen	(Denmark) Amalie Magelund (Denmark) Freja Ravn
Girls' doubles	(Sweden) Emma Karlsson (Sweden) Johanna Magnusson	(Denmark) Alexandra Bøje (Denmark) Julie Dawall Jakobsen	(Poland) Wiktoria Dabczynska (Poland) Aleksandra Goszczynska
Mixed doubles	(Russia) Rodion Alimov (Russia) Alina Davletova	(Scotland) Alexander Dunn (Scotland) Eleanor O'Donnell	(Poland) Paweł Śmiłowski (Poland) Magdalena Świerczyńska
Mixed doubles	(Russia) Rodion Alimov (Russia) Alina Davletova	(Scotland) Alexander Dunn (Scotland) Eleanor O'Donnell	(Slovenia) Miha Ivanič (Slovenia) Nika Arih
Teams	France; Éloi Adam; Thomas Baures; Maxime Briot; Samy Corvée; Fabien Delrue; Thom Gicquel; Arnaud Merklé; Christo Popov; Toma Junior Popov; Léo Rossi; Clara Cotte; Delphine Delrue; Ainoa Desmons; Julie Ferrier; Vimala Hériau; Yaëlle Hoyaux; Léonice Huet; Margot Lambert; Marion Le Turdu; Juliette Moinard	Russia; Rodion Alimov; Georgii Karpov; Dmitrii Klimenko; Pavel Kotsarenko; Mikhail Lavrikov; Nikita Lemeshko; Alina Davletova; Valeriia Makkoveeva; Anastasiia Pustinskaia; Daria Radchenko; Anastasiia Semenova; Anastasia Shapovalova	Denmark; Paw Eriksen; Emil Hybel; Rasmus Kæseler; Rasmus Kjær; Daniel Lundgaard; Karl Thor Søndergaard; Mads Thøgersen; Jesper Toft; Irina Amalie Andersen; Alexandra Bøje; Line Christophersen; Julie Dawall Jakobsen; Amalie Magelund; Elisa Melgaard; Sofie Nielsen; Freja Ravn; Michelle Skødstrup
Teams	France; Éloi Adam; Thomas Baures; Maxime Briot; Samy Corvée; Fabien Delrue; Thom Gicquel; Arnaud Merklé; Christo Popov; Toma Junior Popov; Léo Rossi; Clara Cotte; Delphine Delrue; Ainoa Desmons; Julie Ferrier; Vimala Hériau; Yaëlle Hoyaux; Léonice Huet; Margot Lambert; Marion Le Turdu; Juliette Moinard	Russia; Rodion Alimov; Georgii Karpov; Dmitrii Klimenko; Pavel Kotsarenko; Mikhail Lavrikov; Nikita Lemeshko; Alina Davletova; Valeriia Makkoveeva; Anastasiia Pustinskaia; Daria Radchenko; Anastasiia Semenova; Anastasia Shapovalova	England; Max Flynn; Callum Hemming; David Jones; Zach Russ; Steven Stallwood; Johnnie Torjussen; Abigail Holden; Grace King; Liew Fee Teng; Lizzie Tolman; Hope Warner

== Medal table ==
* Host nation (France)

Rank	Nation	Gold	Silver	Bronze	Total
1	France*	3	1	0	4
2	Denmark	1	1	4	6
3	Russia	1	1	0	2
4	Sweden	1	0	0	1
5	England	0	1	2	3
6	Scotland	0	1	0	1
6	Ukraine	0	1	0	1
8	Poland	0	0	3	3
9	Germany	0	0	1	1
9	Netherlands	0	0	1	1
9	Slovenia	0	0	1	1
Totals (11 entries)		6	6	12	24
