= Paweł Śmiłowski =

Polish badminton player (born 1998)

Personal information
- Born: 26 August 1998 (age 28) Białystok, Poland

Sport
- Country: Poland
- Sport: Badminton

Men's & mixed doubles
- Highest ranking: 157 (MD 21 June 2018); 55 (XD 12 March 2019)
- BWF profile
Medal record
Men's badminton
Representing Poland
European Junior Championships
| Bronze medal – third place | 2017 Mulhouse | Boys' doubles |
| Bronze medal – third place | 2017 Mulhouse | Mixed doubles |

Paweł Śmiłowski (born 26 August 1998) is a Polish badminton player. Born in Białystok, Śmiłowski started to playing badminton at the age of six and join a local club Hubal Białystok. He was the bronze medalists at the 2017 European Junior Championships in the boys' and mixed doubles event. He won his first senior international title at the 2017 Slovak Open in the mixed doubles event partnered with Magdalena Świerczyńska.

Śmiłowski educated at the University of Physical Education and Tourism in Bialystok.

== Achievements ==
=== European Junior Championships ===
Boys' doubles
| Year | Venue | Partner | Opponent | Score | Result |
|---|---|---|---|---|---|
| 2017 | Centre Sportif Régional d'Alsace; Mulhouse, France | (Poland) Robert Cybulski | (England) Max Flynn (England) Callum Hemming | 14–21, 15–21 | Bronze |

Mixed doubles
| Year | Venue | Partner | Opponent | Score | Result |
|---|---|---|---|---|---|
| 2017 | Centre Sportif Régional d'Alsace; Mulhouse, France | (Poland) Magdalena Świerczyńska | (Scotland) Alexander Dunn (Scotland) Eleanor O'Donnell | 21–19, 14–21, 20–22 | Bronze |

=== BWF International Challenge/Series (5 titles, 9 runners-up) ===
Men's doubles
| Year | Tournament | Partner | Opponent | Score | Result |
|---|---|---|---|---|---|
| 2019 | Hellas International | (Poland) Miłosz Bochat | (England) Zach Russ (England) Steven Stallwood | 21–19, 18–21, 21–11 | (gold) Winner |
| 2023 | Polish International | (Poland) Miłosz Bochat | (England) Callum Hemming (England) Ethan van Leeuwen | 16–21, 12–21 | (silver) Runner-up |

Mixed doubles
| Year | Tournament | Partner | Opponent | Score | Result |
|---|---|---|---|---|---|
| 2016 | Lithuanian International | (Poland) Magdalena Świerczyńska | (Russia) Denis Grachev (Russia) Ekaterina Bolotova | 11–21, 16–21 | (silver) Runner-up |
| 2017 | Slovak Open | (Poland) Magdalena Świerczyńska | (Norway) Fredrik Kristensen (Norway) Solvår Flåten Jørgensen | 13–21, 21–13, 21–12 | (gold) Winner |
| 2018 | KaBaL International | (Poland) Magdalena Świerczyńska | (Germany) Peter Käsbauer (Germany) Olga Konon | 10–21, 11–21 | (silver) Runner-up |
| 2018 | Latvia International | (Poland) Magdalena Świerczyńska | (Denmark) Emil Lauritzen (Denmark) Iben Bergstein | 21–17, 25–23 | (gold) Winner |
| 2018 | Lithuanian International | (Poland) Magdalena Świerczyńska | (England) Callum Hemming (England) Fee Teng Liew | 21–17, 14–21, 18–21 | (silver) Runner-up |
| 2018 | Kharkiv International | (Poland) Magdalena Świerczyńska | (India) Saurabh Sharma (India) Anoushka Parikh | 21–18, 19–21, 20–22 | (silver) Runner-up |
| 2018 | Polish International | (Poland) Magdalena Świerczyńska | (Czech Republic) Jakub Bitman (Czech Republic) Alžběta Bášová | 17–21, 21–12, 14–21 | (silver) Runner-up |
| 2019 | Latvia International | (Poland) Wiktoria Adamek | (Germany) Peter Lang (Germany) Hannah Pohl | 21–16, 21–14 | (gold) Winner |
| 2019 | Hellas Open | (Poland) Magdalena Świerczyńska | (France) Fabien Delrue (France) Vimala Hériau | 21–17, 19–21, 15–21 | (silver) Runner-up |
| 2019 | Kharkiv International | (Poland) Magdalena Świerczyńska | (France) Fabien Delrue (France) Vimala Hériau | 22–20, 21–18 | (gold) Winner |
| 2021 | Polish International | (Poland) Wiktoria Adamek | (France) William Villeger (France) Anne Tran | 15–21, 17–21 | (silver) Runner-up |
| 2022 | Polish Open | (Poland) Wiktoria Adamek | (Chinese Taipei) Ye Hong-wei (Chinese Taipei) Lee Chia-hsin | 20–22, 17–21 | (silver) Runner-up |

BWF International Challenge tournament
BWF International Series tournament
BWF Future Series tournament
