= Fee Teng Liew =

English badminton player (born 1999)

Fee Teng Liew 刘飞腾
Personal information
- Born: 10 June 1999 (age 27)

Sport
- Country: England
- Sport: Badminton
- Event: Women's singles & doubles

Women's singles & doubles
- BWF profile

Fee Teng Liew (born 10 June 1999) is an English badminton player and a national champion.

== Biography ==
Liew became an English National doubles champion after winning the English National Badminton Championships mixed doubles title with Max Flynn in 2020.

== Achievements ==
=== BWF International ===
Women's doubles
Year	Tournament	Partner	Opponent	Score	Result
2018	Hellas International	(England) Abigail Holden	(Thailand) Porntip Buranaprasertsuk (Belarus) Kristina Silich	9–21, 19–21	(silver) Runner-up

Mixed doubles
Year	Tournament	Partner	Opponent	Score	Result
2017	Iceland International	(England) Callum Hemming	(England) Steven Stallwood (England) Hope Warner	19–21, 21–16, 21–11	(gold) Winner
2018	Lithuanian International	(England) Callum Hemming	(Poland) Paweł Śmiłowski (Poland) Magdalena Świerczyńska	17–21, 21–14, 21–18	(gold) Winner

BWF International Challenge tournament
BWF International Series tournament
BWF Future Series tournament
