= Rodion Alimov =

Russian badminton player

Personal information
- Born: Rodion Igorevich Alimov (Родион Игоревич Алимов); 21 April 1998 (age 28) Ufa, Russia
- Years active: 2016–present
- Height: 1.85 m (6 ft 1 in)

Sport
- Country: Russia
- Sport: Badminton
- Handedness: Right

Men's & mixed doubles
- Highest ranking: 50 (MD with Maksim Oglobin, 9 June 2026); 18 (XD with Alina Davletova, 18 January 2022)
- Current ranking: 50 (MD with Maksim Oglobin, 9 June 2026)
- BWF profile
Medal record
Men's badminton
Representing Russia
European Championships
Gold medal – first place	2021 Kyiv	Mixed doubles
European Mixed Team Championships
Silver medal – second place	2017 Lubin	Mixed team
Bronze medal – third place	2019 Copenhagen	Mixed team
Bronze medal – third place	2021 Vantaa	Mixed Team
European Men's Team Championships
Bronze medal – third place	2020 Liévin	Men's team
Summer Universiade
Bronze medal – third place	2017 Taipei	Mixed doubles
European Junior Championships
Gold medal – first place	2017 Mulhouse	Mixed doubles
Silver medal – second place	2017 Mulhouse	Mixed team

Rodion Igorevich Alimov (Russian: Родион Игоревич Алимов; born 21 April 1998) is a Russian badminton player. He won the mixed doubles title at the European Junior Championships in 2017 and at the European Championships in 2021.

== Career ==
Born in Ufa, Alimov made a debut in his international career in 2016, and at the same year, he was selected to join the national team. He won his first international title at the 2016 Bulgaria International partnered with Alina Davletova. He and Davletova clinched the mixed doubles gold medal at the 2017 European Junior Championships, made them as the first Russian player to win that category. At the same year, the duo also won the bronze medal at the 2017 Summer Universiade in Taipei. Alimov and Davletova became the first Russians winning the European Championships in mixed doubles, doing so in 2021.

At the 2022 India Open, Alimov and Alina Davletova had to withdraw from the mixed doubles semifinals match after Alimov was tested positive of COVID-19.

Due to the 2022 Russian invasion of Ukraine, athletes from Russia and Belarus were banned by the BWF from participating in all levels of tournaments. However, on 30 June 2025, Alimov and Maksim Ogloblin were accepted to compete as Individual Neutral Athletes. They marked their return to the court at the 2025 Lagos International, competing men's doubles event.

== Achievements ==
=== European Championships ===
Mixed doubles
Year	Venue	Partner	Opponent	Score	Result
2021	Palace of Sports, Kyiv, Ukraine	(Russia) Alina Davletova	(England) Marcus Ellis (England) Lauren Smith	11–21, 21–16, 21–15	Gold

=== Summer Universiade ===
Mixed doubles
Year	Venue	Partner	Opponent	Score	Result
2017	Taipei Gymnasium, Taipei, Taiwan	(Russia) Alina Davletova	(Chinese Taipei) Wang Chi-lin (Chinese Taipei) Lee Chia-hsin	14–21, 13–21	Bronze

=== European Junior Championships ===
Mixed doubles
Year	Venue	Partner	Opponent	Score	Result
2017	Centre Sportif Régional d'Alsace, Mulhouse, France	(Russia) Alina Davletova	(Scotland) Alexander Dunn (Scotland) Eleanor O'Donnell	21–16, 21–14	Gold

=== BWF World Tour (1 title) ===
The BWF World Tour, which was announced on 19 March 2017 and implemented in 2018, is a series of elite badminton tournaments sanctioned by the Badminton World Federation (BWF). The BWF World Tours are divided into levels of World Tour Finals, Super 1000, Super 750, Super 500, Super 300 (part of the HSBC World Tour), and the BWF Tour Super 100.

Mixed doubles
Year	Tournament	Level	Partner	Opponent	Score	Result
2019	Syed Modi International	Super 300	(Russia) Alina Davletova	(England) Marcus Ellis (England) Lauren Smith	21–18, 21–16	(gold) Winner

=== BWF International Challenge/Series (10 titles, 3 runners-up) ===
Men's doubles
Year	Tournament	Partner	Opponent	Score	Result
2025	Lagos International	(Individual Neutral Athletes) Maksim Ogloblin	(United Arab Emirates) P.S Ravikrishna (United Arab Emirates) Somi Romdhani	21–15, 21–12	(gold) Winner
2025	Astana International	(Individual Neutral Athletes) Maksim Ogloblin	(Indonesia) Muhammad Rian Ardianto (Indonesia) Rahmat Hidayat	10–21, 14–21	(silver) Runner-up

Mixed doubles
Year	Tournament	Partner	Opponent	Score	Result
2016	Bulgarian International	(Russia) Alina Davletova	(Russia) Andrei Ivanov (Russia) Ksenia Evgenova	Walkover	(gold) Winner
2016	Turkey International	(Russia) Alina Davletova	(Turkey) Melih Turgut (Turkey) Fatma Nur Yavuz	19–21, 14–21	(silver) Runner-up
2017	Estonian International	(Russia) Alina Davletova	(Russia) Anatoliy Yartsev (Russia) Evgeniya Kosetskaya	21–8, 21–19	(gold) Winner
2017	Hungarian International	(Russia) Alina Davletova	(Denmark) Soren Gravholt (Sweden) Louise Eriksson	25–23, 21–16	(gold) Winner
2018	White Nights	(Russia) Alina Davletova	(Singapore) Jason Wong (Singapore) Citra Putri Sari Dewi	21–14, 21–19	(gold) Winner
2018	Hungarian International	(Russia) Alina Davletova	(Denmark) Joel Eipe (Denmark) Mette Poulsen	10–21, 21–19, 10–21	(silver) Runner-up
2018	Italian International	(Russia) Alina Davletova	(Russia) Evgenij Dremin (Russia) Evgenia Dimova	21–13, 21–16	(gold) Winner
2019	White Nights	(Russia) Alina Davletova	(Republic of Ireland) Sam Magee (Republic of Ireland) Chloe Magee	21–16, 13–21, 21–16	(gold) Winner
2019	Dubai International	(Russia) Alina Davletova	(South Korea) Kim Sa-rang (South Korea) Kim Ha-na	22–20, 21–16	(gold) Winner
2026 (I)	India International	(Individual Neutral Athletes) Alina Davletova	(India) C Lalramsanga (India) Angel Punera	21–12, 21–14	(gold) Winner
2026 (II)	India International	(Individual Neutral Athletes) Alina Davletova	(India) Sathish Karunakaran (India) Ashwini Ponnappa	19–21, 21–11, 21–13	(gold) Winner

BWF International Challenge tournament
BWF International Series tournament
BWF Future Series tournament
