= Callum Hemming =

English badminton player (born 1999)

Personal information
- Born: 27 June 1999 (age 27) Milton Keynes, England

Sport
- Country: England
- Sport: Badminton

Men's & mixed doubles
- Highest ranking: 37 (MD with Steven Stallwood, 18 October 2022); 25 (XD with Estelle van Leeuwen, 2 September 2025); 33 (XD with Jessica Pugh, 15 November 2022)
- Current ranking: 30 (XD with Estelle van Leeuwen, 27 October 2026)
- BWF profile
Medal record
Men's badminton
Representing England
European Championships
Silver medal – second place	2026 Huelva	Mixed doubles
European Mixed Team Championships
Bronze medal – third place	2023 Aire-sur-la-Lys	Mixed team
Bronze medal – third place	2025 Baku	Mixed team
European Men's Team Championships
Bronze medal – third place	2024 Łódź	Men's team
Bronze medal – third place	2026 Istanbul	Men's team
European Junior Championships
Silver medal – second place	2017 Mulhouse	Boys' doubles
Bronze medal – third place	2017 Mulhouse	Mixed team

Callum Hemming (born 27 June 1999) is an English badminton player. He won the silver medals at the 2014 European U15 Championships in the boys' doubles event and 2016 European U17 Championships in the mixed team event. In 2017, he won his first senior title at the Iceland International tournament in the mixed doubles event.

== Achievements ==
=== European Championships ===
Mixed doubles
Year	Venue	Partner	Opponent	Score	Result
2026	Palacio de los Deportes Carolina Marín, Huelva, Spain	(England) Estelle van Leeuwen	(Denmark) Mathias Christiansen (Denmark) Alexandra Bøje	19–21, 14–21	Silver

=== European Junior Championships ===
Boys' doubles
Year	Venue	Partner	Opponent	Score	Result
2017	Centre Sportif Régional d'Alsace, Mulhouse, France	(England) Max Flynn	(France) Thom Gicquel (France) Toma Junior Popov	17–21, 13–21	Silver

=== BWF International Challenge/Series (11 titles, 7 runners-up) ===
Men's doubles
Year	Tournament	Partner	Opponent	Score	Result
2018	Welsh International	(England) Max Flynn	(Denmark) Andreas Søndergaard (Denmark) Mikkel Stoffersen	28–26, 21–17	(gold) Winner
2022	Dutch Open	(England) Ethan van Leeuwen	(Chinese Taipei) Chiu Hsiang-chieh (Chinese Taipei) Yang Ming-tse	16–21, 13–21	(silver) Runner-up
2023	Polish International	(England) Ethan van Leeuwen	(Poland) Miłosz Bochat (Poland) Paweł Śmiłowski	21–16, 21–12	(gold) Winner
2023	Dutch Open	(England) Ethan van Leeuwen	(England) Rory Easton (England) Zach Russ	21–23, 17–21	(silver) Runner-up

Mixed doubles
Year	Tournament	Partner	Opponent	Score	Result
2017	Iceland International	(England) Fee Teng Liew	(England) Steven Stallwood (England) Hope Warner	19–21, 21–16, 21–11	(gold) Winner
2018	Lithuanian International	(England) Fee Teng Liew	(Poland) Paweł Śmiłowski (Poland) Magdalena Świerczyńska	17–21, 21–14, 21–18	(gold) Winner
2021	Portugal International	(England) Jessica Pugh	(France) William Villeger (France) Sharone Bauer	21–18, 19–21, 21–15	(gold) Winner
2021	Spanish International	(England) Jessica Pugh	(Malaysia) Tee Kai Wun (Malaysia) Teoh Mei Xing	15–21, 21–13, 19–21	(silver) Runner-up
2021	Scottish Open	(England) Jessica Pugh	(India) Ishaan Bhatnagar (India) Tanisha Crasto	21-15, 21–17	(gold) Winner
2021	Welsh International	(England) Jessica Pugh	(France) William Villeger (France) Anne Tran	15–21, 21–17, 16–21	(silver) Runner-up
2022	Dutch Open	(England) Jessica Pugh	(Netherlands) Robin Tabeling (Netherlands) Selena Piek	17–21, 12–21	(silver) Runner-up
2023	Polish International	(England) Estelle van Leeuwen	(Sweden) Melker Z-Bexell (Sweden) Tilda Sjoo	21–14, 21–13	(gold) Winner
2023	Dutch Open	(England) Estelle van Leeuwen	(Denmark) Rasmus Espersen (Denmark) Amalie Cecilie Kudsk	21–18, 21–6	(gold) Winner
2024	Polish Open	(England) Estelle van Leeuwen	(Canada) Ty Alexander Lindeman (Canada) Josephine Wu	16–21, 20–22	(silver) Runner-up
2024	Nantes International	(England) Estelle van Leeuwen	(Denmark) Jesper Toft (Denmark) Amalie Magelund	11–21, 13–21	(silver) Runner-up
2024	Dutch Open	(England) Estelle van Leeuwen	(Netherlands) Robin Tabeling (Netherlands) Selena Piek	17–21, 21–15, 22–20	(gold) Winner
2024	Irish Open	(England) Estelle van Leeuwen	(Denmark) Rasmus Espersen (Denmark) Amalie Cecilie Kudsk	19–21, 21–18, 21–14	(gold) Winner
2026	Denmark Challenge	(England) Estelle van Leeuwen	(Denmark) Jeppe Søby (Denmark) Sofie Røjkjær	21–15, 21–9	(gold) Winner

BWF International Challenge tournament
BWF International Series tournament
BWF Future Series tournament
