= Magdalena Świerczyńska =

Polish badminton player (born 1998)

Personal information
- Born: 4 April 1998 (age 28) Poznań, Poland

Sport
- Country: Poland
- Sport: Badminton

Women's & mixed doubles
- Highest ranking: 222 (WD 25 June 2019); 55 (XD 12 March 2019)
- Current ranking: 78 (XD 15 March 2022)
- BWF profile
Medal record
Women's badminton
Representing Poland
European Junior Championships
Bronze medal – third place	2017 Mulhouse	Mixed doubles

Magdalena Świerczyńska (born 4 April 1998) is a Polish badminton player. Świerczyńska trained at the Baranowo, and was the bronze medalist at the 2017 European Junior Championships in the mixed doubles event partnered with Paweł Śmiłowski. She won her first senior international title at the 2017 Slovak Open in the mixed doubles event.

== Achievements ==
=== European Junior Championships ===
Mixed doubles
Year	Venue	Partner	Opponent	Score	Result
2017	Centre Sportif Régional d'Alsace; Mulhouse, France	(Poland) Paweł Śmiłowski	(Scotland) Alexander Dunn (Scotland) Eleanor O'Donnell	21–19, 14–21, 20–22	Bronze

=== BWF International Challenge/Series (3 titles, 8 runners-up) ===
Mixed doubles
Year	Tournament	Partner	Opponent	Score	Result
2016	Lithuanian International	(Poland) Paweł Śmiłowski	(Russia) Denis Grachev (Russia) Ekaterina Bolotova	11–21, 16–21	(silver) Runner-up
2017	Slovak Open	(Poland) Paweł Śmiłowski	(Norway) Fredrik Kristensen (Norway) Solvår Flåten Jørgensen	13–21, 21–13, 21–12	(gold) Winner
2018	KaBaL International	(Poland) Paweł Śmiłowski	(Germany) Peter Käsbauer (Germany) Olga Konon	10–21, 11–21	(silver) Runner-up
2018	Latvia International	(Poland) Paweł Śmiłowski	(Denmark) Emil Lauritzen (Denmark) Iben Bergstein	21–17, 25–23	(gold) Winner
2018	Lithuanian International	(Poland) Paweł Śmiłowski	(England) Callum Hemming (England) Fee Teng Liew	21–17, 14–21, 18–21	(silver) Runner-up
2018	Kharkiv International	(Poland) Paweł Śmiłowski	(India) Saurabh Sharma (India) Anoushka Parikh	21–18, 19–21, 20–22	(silver) Runner-up
2018	Polish International	(Poland) Paweł Śmiłowski	(Czech Republic) Jakub Bitman (Czech Republic) Alžběta Bášová	17–21, 21–12, 14–21	(silver) Runner-up
2019	Hellas International	(Poland) Miłosz Bochat	(Bulgaria) Alex Vlaar (Bulgaria) Mariya Mitsova	21–10, 21–23, 17–21	(silver) Runner-up
2019	Hellas Open	(Poland) Paweł Śmiłowski	(France) Fabien Delrue (France) Vimala Hériau	21–17, 19–21, 15–21	(silver) Runner-up
2019	Kharkiv International	(Poland) Paweł Śmiłowski	(France) Fabien Delrue (France) Vimala Hériau	22–20, 21–18	(gold) Winner
2022	Slovak Open	(Poland) Wiktor Trecki	(Hong Kong) Yeung Ming Nok (Hong Kong) Yeung Pui Lam	16–21, 12–21	(silver) Runner-up

BWF International Challenge tournament
BWF International Series tournament
BWF Future Series tournament
