= Vimala Hériau =

French badminton player (born 1999)

Personal information
- Born: 10 February 1999 (age 27) Argenteuil, France
- Height: 1.68 m (5 ft 6 in)

Sport
- Country: France
- Sport: Badminton
- Handedness: Right

Women's & mixed doubles
- Highest ranking: 47 (WD with Margot Lambert 2 February 2021); 71 (XD with Fabien Delrue 2 February 2021)
- Current ranking: 72 (WD with Margot Lambert); 75 (XD with Fabien Delrue) (16 August 2022)
- BWF profile
Medal record
Women's badminton
Representing France
European Women's Team Championships
Bronze medal – third place	2020 Liévin	Women's team
European Mixed Team Championships
Silver medal – second place	2021 Vantaa	Mixed team
European Junior Championships
Gold medal – first place	2017 Mulhouse	Mixed team
Bronze medal – third place	2015 Lubin	Mixed team

Vimala Hériau (born 10 February 1999) is a French badminton player who affiliate with Racing Club de France. She was part of the national team that won the gold medal at the 2017 European Junior Championships. She won her first senior international title by winning the women's and mixed doubles event at the 2019 Hellas Open. Hériau was the women's doubles National Champions in 2018 and 2020.

== Achievements ==
=== BWF International Challenge/Series (2 titles, 7 runners-up) ===
Women's doubles
Year	Tournament	Partner	Opponent	Score	Result
2015	Riga International	(France) Margot Lambert	(Estonia) Kristin Kuuba (Estonia) Helina Rüütel	22–20, 17–21, 12–21	(silver) Runner-up
2018	Hellas Open	(France) Margot Lambert	(India) Rutaparna Panda (India) Arathi Sara Sunil	19–21, 12–21	(silver) Runner-up
2019	Hellas Open	(France) Margot Lambert	(Ukraine) Anastasiya Prozorova (Ukraine) Valeriya Rudakova	21–13, 21–16	(gold) Winner
2020	Estonian International	(France) Margot Lambert	(Japan) Rena Miyaura (Japan) Saori Ozaki	18–21, 18–21	(silver) Runner-up
2020	Swedish Open	(France) Margot Lambert	(Denmark) Julie Finne-Ipsen (Denmark) Mai Surrow	20–22, 20–22	(silver) Runner-up
2022	Portugal International	(France) Sharone Bauer	(Hong Kong) Yeung Nga Ting (Hong Kong) Yeung Pui Lam	14–21, 8–21	(silver) Runner-up

Mixed doubles
Year	Tournament	Partner	Opponent	Score	Result
2019	Dutch International	(France) William Villeger	(Denmark) Mathias Thyrri (Denmark) Elisa Melgaard	14–21, 21–16, 12–21	(silver) Runner-up
2019	Hellas Open	(France) Fabien Delrue	(Poland) Paweł Śmiłowski (Poland) Magdalena Świerczyńska	17–21, 21–19, 21–15	(gold) Winner
2019	Kharkiv International	(France) Fabien Delrue	(Poland) Paweł Śmiłowski (Poland) Magdalena Świerczyńska	20–22, 18–21	(silver) Runner-up

BWF International Challenge tournament
BWF International Series tournament
BWF Future Series tournament
