= Abigail Holden =

English badminton player

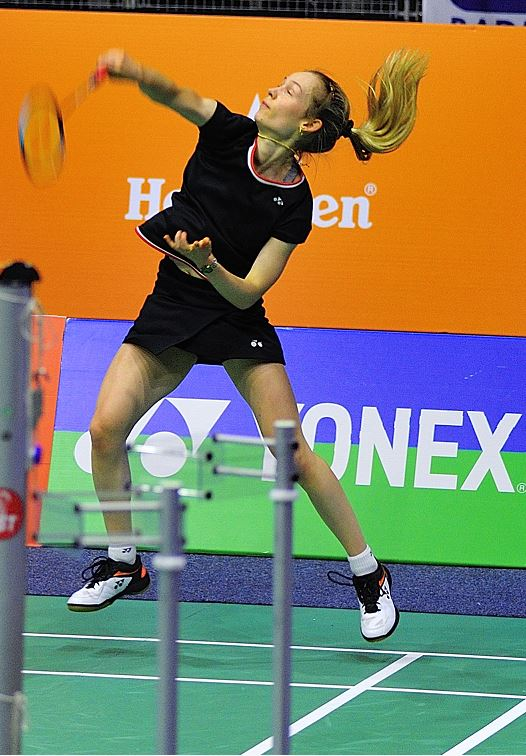

Personal information
- Born: 29 August 1999 (age 27) Wokingham, England

Sport
- Country: England
- Sport: Badminton

Women's singles
- Highest ranking: 111 (22 November 2022)
- BWF profile
Medal record
Women's badminton
Representing England
European Mixed Team Championships
Bronze medal – third place	2023 Aire-sur-la-Lys	Mixed team
European Junior Championships
Bronze medal – third place	2017 Mulhouse	Mixed team

Abigail Holden (born 29 August 1999) is an English badminton player who competes in international events. She took the English National crown in the women's singles event at the 2021 English National Badminton Championships. She competes for her club Surrey Smashers. She is currently ranked world number 152 in women's singles and world number 183 in women's doubles

== Achievements ==
=== BWF International Challenge/Series (4 titles, 2 runners-up) ===
Women's singles
Year	Tournament	Opponent	Score	Result
2019	Czech Open	(Hungary) Réka Madarász	21–14, 18–21, 21–15	(gold) Winner
2019	Iceland International	(Switzerland) Ayla Huser	21–16, 22–24, 6–21	(silver) Runner-up
2021	Hellas International	(Hungary) Vivien Sándorházi	18–21, 21–15, 21–14	(gold) Winner
2021	Dutch Open	(Estonia) Kristin Kuuba	21–23, 18–21	(silver) Runner-up

Women's doubles
Year	Tournament	Partner	Opponent	Score	Result
2019	Welsh International	(England) Lizzie Tolman	(England) Freya Redfearn (England) Hope Warner	8–21, 21–15, 21–16	(gold) Winner
2019	Iceland International	(England) Sian Kelly	(Iceland) Sigríður Árnadóttir (Iceland) Margrét Jóhannsdóttir	23–21, 21–18	(gold) Winner

BWF International Challenge tournament
BWF International Series tournament
BWF Future Series tournament
