= Eleanor O'Donnell =

Scottish badminton player (born 1998)

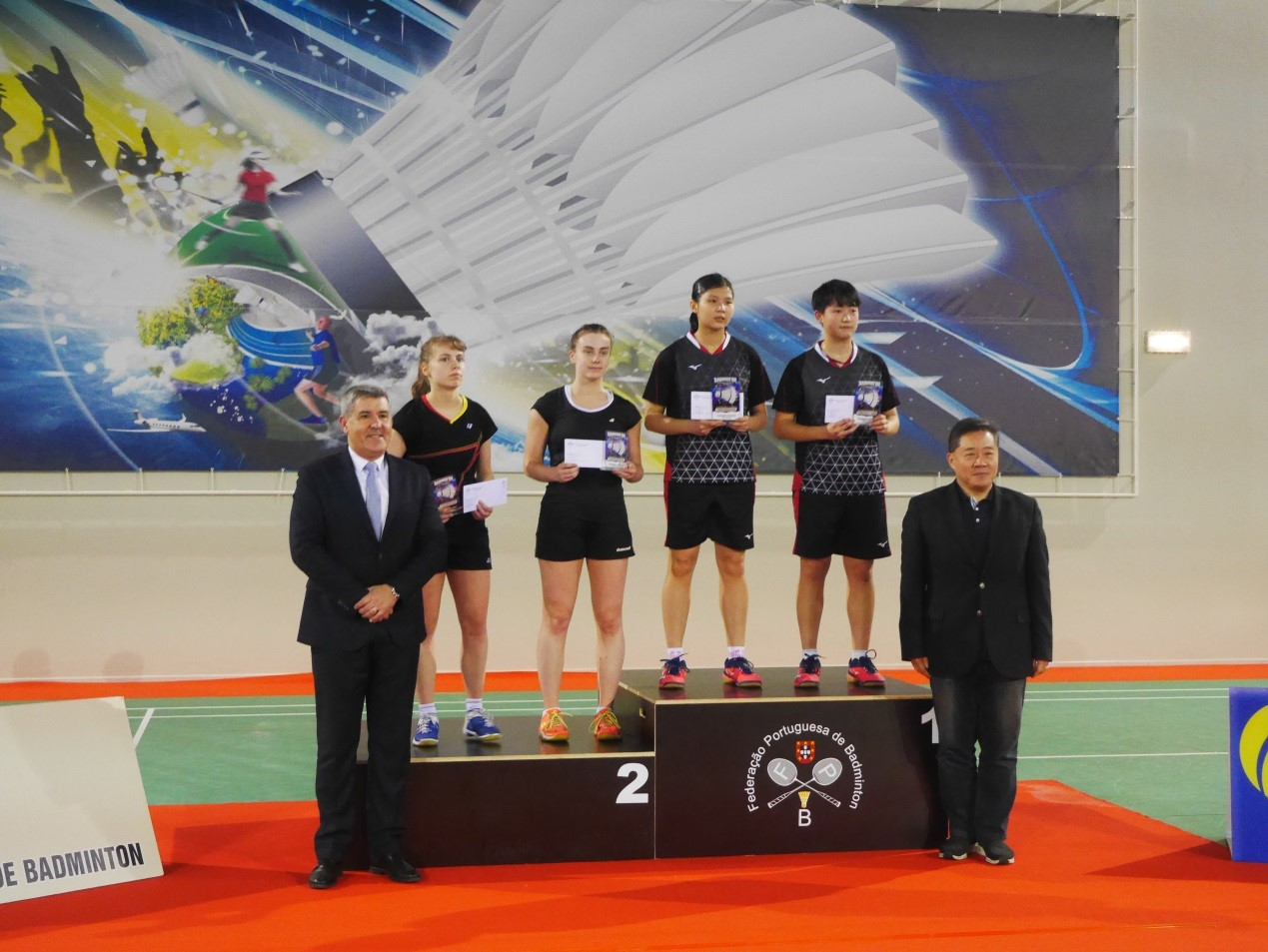

Personal information
- Born: 1 September 1998 (age 28) Paisley, Renfrewshire, Scotland
- Height: 1.68 m (5 ft 6 in)

Sport
- Country: Scotland
- Sport: Badminton
- Handedness: Right

Women's & mixed doubles
- Highest ranking: 58 (WD with Julie MacPherson 1 June 2017); 67 (XD with Christopher Grimley 18 October 2022)
- BWF profile
Medal record
Women's badminton
Representing Scotland
European Women's Team Championships
Bronze medal – third place	2020 Liévin	Women's team
European Junior Championships
Silver medal – second place	2017 Mulhouse	Mixed doubles

Eleanor O'Donnell (born 1 September 1998) is a Scottish badminton player who competes in international level events. Her highest achievements were winning a silver medal at the 2017 European Junior Championships and competing as the youngest competitor of the Scottish team at the 2018 Commonwealth Games.

== Achievements ==
=== European Junior Championships ===
Mixed doubles
Year	Venue	Partner	Opponent	Score	Result
2017	Centre Sportif Régional d'Alsace; Mulhouse, France	(Scotland) Alexander Dunn	(Russia) Rodion Alimov (Russia) Alina Davletova	16–21, 14–21	Silver

=== BWF International Challenge/Series (2 titles, 1 runner-up) ===
Women's doubles
Year	Tournament	Partner	Opponent	Score	Result
2018	Iceland International	(Scotland) Julie MacPherson	(Denmark) Emilie Furbo (Denmark) Trine Villadsen	17–21, 21–13, 21–17	(gold) Winner
2018	Portugal International	(Scotland) Julie MacPherson	(Chinese Taipei) Li Zi-qing (Chinese Taipei) Teng Chun-hsun	15–21, 13–21	(silver) Runner-up

Mixed doubles
Year	Tournament	Partner	Opponent	Score	Result
2020	Portugal International	(Scotland) Christopher Grimley	(Scotland) Adam Pringle (Scotland) Rachel Andrew	21–18, 21–6	(gold) Winner

BWF International Challenge tournament
BWF International Series tournament
BWF Future Series tournament
