= Max Flynn =

English badminton player (born 1998)

Personal information
- Born: 17 April 1998 (age 28)

Sport
- Country: England
- Sport: Badminton

Men's & mixed doubles
- Highest ranking: 71 (MD with Matthew Clare 4 May 2021); 145 (XD with Lizzie Tolman 25 January 2018)
- BWF profile
Medal record
Men's badminton
Representing England
European Junior Championships
Silver medal – second place	2017 Mulhouse	Boys' doubles
Bronze medal – third place	2017 Mulhouse	Mixed team

Max Flynn (born 1998) is an English badminton player and a national champion.

== Career ==
Flynn became an English National doubles champion after winning the English National Badminton Championships mixed doubles title with Fee Teng Liew in 2020.

== Achievements ==
=== European Junior Championships ===
Boys' doubles
Year	Venue	Partner	Opponent	Score	Result
2017	Centre Sportif Régional d'Alsace; Mulhouse, France	(England) Callum Hemming	(France) Thom Gicquel (France) Toma Junior Popov	17–21, 13–21	Silver

=== BWF International Challenge/Series ===
Men's doubles
Year	Tournament	Partner	Opponent	Score	Result
2018	Welsh International	(England) Callum Hemming	(Denmark) Andreas Søndergaard (Denmark) Mikkel Stoffersen	28–26, 21–17	(gold) Winner
2019	Belarus International	(England) Matthew Clare	(China) Ou Xuanyi (China) Zhang Nan	15–21, 15–21	(silver) Runner-up

Mixed doubles
Year	Tournament	Partner	Opponent	Score	Result
2018	Welsh International	(Sweden) Moa Sjöö	(England) Matthew Clare (England) Victoria Williams	14–21, 8–21	(silver) Runner-up

BWF International Challenge tournament
BWF International Series tournament
BWF Future Series tournament
