= 2018 BWF Future Series =

The 2018 BWF Future Series was the twelfth season of the BWF Future Series.

== Schedule ==
Below is the schedule released by Badminton World Federation:

Tour	Official title	Venue	City	Date		Prize money USD	Prospectus	Report
Tour	Official title	Venue	City	Start	Finish	Prize money USD	Prospectus	Report
1	(New Zealand) YONEX North Harbour International 2018	Badminton North Harbour Centre	Auckland	February 1	February 4	5,000		Report
2	Algeria International 2018	Hacène Harcha Arena	Algiers	February 7	February 9	—N/a		Report
3	(Slovakia) YONEX Slovak Open 2018	Športové centrum M-SPORT Trenčín	Trenčín	February 28	March 3	—N/a		Report
4	(Cuba) XIX Giraldilla Tournament	Coliseo de la Ciudad Deportiva	Havana	March 14	March 18	5,000		Report
5	(Croatia) VICTOR Croatian International 2018	Dom Sportova	Zagreb	March 29	April 1	500		Report
6	VI Argentina International 2018	CeNARD	Buenos Aires	April 5	April 8	—N/a		Report
7	(Greece) Hellas International 2018	Sidirokastro Indoor Hall	Athens	April 19	April 22	—N/a		Report
8	(Peru) Perú Future Series 2018	Villa Deportiva Nacional	Lima	May 17	May 20	2,750		Report
~~9~~	~~(Romania) Romanian International 2018~~	~~TBC~~	~~TBC~~	~~May 24~~	~~May 27~~	—N/a		~~Report~~
10	YONEX Latvia International 2018	Jelgava City Sport Hall	Jelgava	May 31	June 3	—N/a		Report
11	(Lithuania) YONEX Lithuanian International 2018	Kaunas Sports Hall	Kaunas	June 7	June 10	—N/a		Report
12	FLEET Mauritius International 2018	National Badminton Centre	Beau Bassin-Rose Hill	June 7	June 10	—N/a		Report
~~13~~	~~Mexico Future Series 2018~~	~~TBC~~	~~Guanajuato~~	~~June 14~~	~~June 17~~	—N/a		~~Report~~
~~14~~	~~IX Colombia International 2018~~	~~TBC~~	~~Barranquilla~~	~~June 21~~	~~June 24~~	—N/a		~~Report~~
15	Benin International 2018	Hall des arts, Loisirs et Sports de Cotonou	Cotonou	June 28	July 1	—N/a		Report
16	(Suriname) Carebaco International 2018	Ring Sport Center	Paramaribo	August 21	August 24	—N/a		Report
17	Belarus International 2018	Falcon Club	Minsk	September 6	September 9	5,000		Report
~~18~~	~~Ethiopia International 2018~~	~~TBC~~	~~Addis Ababa~~	~~September 20~~	~~September 23~~	—N/a		~~Report~~
19	(Bulgaria) Babolat Bulgarian International 2018	Sofia Badminton Center	Sofia	October 4	October 7	—N/a		Report
20	(Israel) Hatzor International 2018	Kibbutz Hatzor Sport Hall	Kibbutz Hatzor	October 24	October 27	—N/a		Report
21	Morocco International 2018	Sport Hall Olympic	Casablanca	November 1	November 4	—N/a		Report
22	(Slovakia) VICTOR Slovenia Future Series 2018	Športna dvorana Brežice	Brežice	November 22	November 25	—N/a		Report
23	Botswana International 2018	Lobatse Stadium	Gaborone	November 22	November 25	—N/a		Report
24	(Dominican Republic) Dominican Open 2018	Table Tennis Pavilion	Santo Domingo	November 28	December 2	6,000		Report
25	Zambia International 2018	Olympic Youth Development Centre	Lusaka	November 29	December 2	—N/a		Report
26	El Salvador Future Series 2018	TBC	San Salvador	December 6	December 9	—N/a		Report
27	South Africa International 2018	John Tyers Badminton Hall	Cape Town	December 6	December 9	—N/a		Report

== Results ==
=== Winners ===
Tour	Men's singles	Women's singles	Men's doubles	Women's doubles	Mixed doubles
New Zealand	(New Zealand) Oscar Guo	(Indonesia) Jesica Muljati	(New Zealand) Kevin Dennerly-Minturn (New Zealand) Oliver Leydon-Davis	(Australia) Leanne Choo (Australia) Renuga Veeran	(New Zealand) Maika Philips (New Zealand) Anona Pak
Algeria	(Morocco) Bilal Elharab	(Algeria) Halla Bouksani	(Algeria) Mohamed Abderrahime Belarbi (Algeria) Adel Hamek	(Egypt) Doha Hany (Egypt) Hadia Hosny	(Algeria) Mohamed Amine Guelmaoui (Algeria) Malak Ouchefoune
Slovakia	(Indonesia) Andre Marteen	(Hong Kong) Deng Xuan	(Chinese Taipei) Lu Chen (Chinese Taipei) Ye Hong-wei	(Chinese Taipei) Li Zi-qing (Chinese Taipei) Teng Chun-hsun	(Chinese Taipei) Ye Hong-wei (Chinese Taipei) Teng Chun-hsun
Cuba	(Canada) Xiaodong Sheng	(United States) Crystal Pan	(Cuba) Osleni Guerrero (Cuba) Leodannis Martínez	(Cuba) Thalia Mengana Marrero (Cuba) Tahimara Oropeza	(Cuba) Osleni Guerrero (Cuba) Adriana Artiz Ataury
Croatia	(Bulgaria) Daniel Nikolov	(Bulgaria) Mariya Mitsova	(Germany) Pater Lang (Germany) Thomas Legleitner	(Russia) Ksenia Evgenova (Russia) Anastasiia Semenova	(Poland) Paweł Pietryja (Poland) Aneta Wojtkowska
Argentina	(Brazil) Fabricio Farias	(Brazil) Jaqueline Lima	(Italy) Enrico Baroni (Italy) Giovanni Toti	(Argentina) Florencia Bernatene (Argentina) Bárbara María Berruezo	(Brazil) Fabricio Farias (Brazil) Jaqueline Lima
Greece	(France) Toma Junior Popov	(Thailand) Porntip Buranaprasertsuk	(Bulgaria) Daniel Nikolov (Bulgaria) Ivan Rusev	(Thailand) Porntip Buranaprasertsuk (Belarus) Kristina Silich	(Bulgaria) Dimitar Yanakiev (Bulgaria) Mariya Mitsova
Peru	(Mexico) Luis Ramón Garrido	(Peru) Daniela Macías	(Peru) Jose Guevara (Peru) Daniel la Torre Regal	(Peru) Daniela Macías (Peru) Dánica Nishimura	(Peru) Daniel la Torre Regal (Peru) Dánica Nishimura
Romania	cancelled				
Latvia	(France) Toma Junior Popov	(Estonia) Kristin Kuuba	(France) Fabien Delrue (France) William Villeger	(Estonia) Kristin Kuuba (Estonia) Helina Rüütel	(Poland) Paweł Śmiłowski (Poland) Magdalena Świerczyńska
Lithuania	(Sweden) Felix Burestedt	(Estonia) Kristin Kuuba	(Czech Republic) Jaromír Janáček (Czech Republic) Tomáš Švejda	(Estonia) Kristin Kuuba (Estonia) Helina Rüütel	(England) Callum Hemming (England) Liew Fee Teng
Mauritius	(Malaysia) Goh Giap Chin	(Malaysia) Letshana Karupathevan	(Austria) Daniel Graßmück (Austria) Roman Zirnwald	(India) Simran Singhi (India) Ritika Thaker	(Mauritius) Georges Paul (Mauritius) Aurélie Allet
Mexico	cancelled				
Colombia	cancelled				
Benin	(Belgium) Maxime Moreels	(Benin) Pascaline Ludoskine Yeno Vitou	(Benin) Gbenoukpo Sebastiano Degbe (Benin) Tobiloba Oyewole	(Benin) Xena Arisa (Benin) Adjele Joeline Degbey	(Benin) Tobiloba Oyewole (Benin) Xena Arisa
Suriname	(Luxembourg) Robert Mann	(Barbados) Tamisha Williams	(Barbados) Shae Michael Martin (Barbados) Dakeil Thorpe	(Barbados) Monyata Riviera (Barbados) Tamisha Williams	(Suriname) Dylan Darmohoetomo (Suriname) Crystal Leefmans
Belarus	(Azerbaijan) Ade Resky Dwicahyo	(France) Marie Batomene	(Azerbaijan) Ade Resky Dwicahyo (Azerbaijan) Azmy Qowimuramadhoni	(Russia) Olga Arkhangelskaya (Russia) Elizaveta Tarasova	(Poland) Robert Cybulski (Poland) Wiktoria Dabczynska
Ethiopia	cancelled				
Bulgaria	(Sweden) Albin Carl Hjelm	(Spain) Sara Penalver	(Czech Republic) Jaromir Janacek (Czech Republic) Tomas Svejda	(Sweden) Moa Sjoo (Sweden) Tilda Sjoo	(Bulgaria) Alex Vlaar (Bulgaria) Mariya Mitsova
Israel	(India) Kaushal Dharmamer	(Israel) Ksenia Polikarpova	(Israel) Ariel Shainski (Czech Republic) Lukas Zevl	(Israel) Ksenia Polikarpova (Belarus) Kristina Silich	(Ukraine) Mykhaylo Makhnovskiy (Ukraine) Anastasiya Prozorova
Morocco	cancelled				
Slovenia	(Serbia) Luka Milic	(Spain) Sara Penalver	(Denmark) Oliver Gram (Denmark) Mads Thogersen	(Croatia) Katarina Galenic (Croatia) Maja Pavlinic	(Slovenia) Miha Ivancic (Slovenia) Petra Polanc
Botswana	(Azerbaijan) Ade Resky Dwicahyo	(Jordan) Domou Amro	(Azerbaijan) Ade Resky Dwicahyo (Azerbaijan) Azmy Qowimuramadhoni	(South Africa) Michelle Butler-Emmett (South Africa) Jennifer Fry	(South Africa) Andries Malan (South Africa) Jennifer Fry
Dominican Republic	(Mexico) Job Castillo	(Mexico) Sabrina Solis	(Mexico) Job Castillo (Mexico) Luis Armando Montoya	(Dominican Republic) Nairoby Abigail Jimenez (Dominican Republic) Bermary Polanco	(Dominican Republic) Nelson Javier (Dominican Republic) Nairoby Abigail Jimenez
Zambia	(Azerbaijan) Ade Resky Dwicahyo	(Nigeria) Dorcas Adesokan	(Azerbaijan) Ade Resky Dwicahyo (Azerbaijan) Azmy Qowimuramadhoni	(Zambia) Evelyn Siamupangila (Zambia) Ogar Siamupangila	(Nigeria) Anuoluwapo Opeyori (Nigeria) Dorcas Adesokan
El Salvador	(Canada) Brian Yang	(Peru) Daniela Macias	(Guatemala) Ruben Castellanos (Guatemala) Anibal Marroquin	(Peru) Daniela Macias (Peru) Danica Nishimura	(Canada) Brian Yang (Canada) Catherine Choi
South Africa	(Azerbaijan) Azmy Qowimuramadhoni	(Nigeria) Dorcas Adesokan	(Azerbaijan) Ade Resky Dwicahyo (Azerbaijan) Azmy Qowimuramadhoni	(South Africa) Lehandre Schoeman (South Africa) Johanita Scholtz	(South Africa) Andries Malan (South Africa) Jennifer Fry

=== Performance by nation ===
Rank	Nation	NZL	ALG	SVK	CUB	CRO	ARG	GRE	PER	ROU	LAT	LTU	MRI	MEX	COL	BEN	SUR	BLR	ETH	BUL	ISR	MAR	SLO	BOT	DOM	ZAM	ESA	RSA	Total
1	Azerbaijan									—N/a				—N/a	—N/a			2	—N/a					2		2		2	8
2	Peru								4	—N/a				—N/a	—N/a				—N/a								2		6
3	Bulgaria					2		2		—N/a				—N/a	—N/a				—N/a	1									5
4	Benin									—N/a				—N/a	—N/a	4			—N/a										4
4	Estonia									—N/a	2	2		—N/a	—N/a				—N/a										4
4	France							1		—N/a	2			—N/a	—N/a			1	—N/a										4
4	Mexico								1	—N/a				—N/a	—N/a				—N/a						3				4
4	South Africa									—N/a				—N/a	—N/a				—N/a					2				2	4
9	Algeria		3							—N/a				—N/a	—N/a				—N/a										3
9	Brazil						3			—N/a				—N/a	—N/a				—N/a										3
9	Canada				1					—N/a				—N/a	—N/a				—N/a								2		3
9	Chinese Taipei			3						—N/a				—N/a	—N/a				—N/a										3
9	Cuba				3					—N/a				—N/a	—N/a				—N/a										3
9	New Zealand	3								—N/a				—N/a	—N/a				—N/a										3
9	Nigeria									—N/a				—N/a	—N/a				—N/a							2		1	3
9	Poland					1				—N/a	1			—N/a	—N/a			1	—N/a										3
9	Sweden									—N/a		1		—N/a	—N/a				—N/a	2									3
18	Czech Republic									—N/a		1		—N/a	—N/a				—N/a	1	0.5								2.5
19	Barbados									—N/a				—N/a	—N/a		2		—N/a										2
19	Dominican Republic									—N/a				—N/a	—N/a				—N/a						2				2
19	India									—N/a			1	—N/a	—N/a				—N/a		1								2
19	Indonesia	1		1						—N/a				—N/a	—N/a				—N/a										2
19	Israel									—N/a				—N/a	—N/a				—N/a		2								2
19	Malaysia									—N/a			2	—N/a	—N/a				—N/a										2
19	Russia					1				—N/a				—N/a	—N/a			1	—N/a										2
19	Spain									—N/a				—N/a	—N/a				—N/a	1			1						2
27	Thailand							1.5		—N/a				—N/a	—N/a				—N/a										1.5
27	Argentina						1			—N/a				—N/a	—N/a				—N/a										1
27	Australia	1								—N/a				—N/a	—N/a				—N/a										1
27	Austria									—N/a			1	—N/a	—N/a				—N/a										1
27	Belarus							0.5		—N/a				—N/a	—N/a				—N/a		0.5								1
27	Belgium									—N/a				—N/a	—N/a	1			—N/a										1
27	Denmark									—N/a				—N/a	—N/a				—N/a				1						1
27	Denmark									—N/a				—N/a	—N/a				—N/a				1						1
27	Egypt		1							—N/a				—N/a	—N/a				—N/a										1
27	England									—N/a		1		—N/a	—N/a				—N/a										1
27	Germany					1				—N/a				—N/a	—N/a				—N/a										1
27	Guatemala									—N/a				—N/a	—N/a				—N/a								1		1
27	Hong Kong			1						—N/a				—N/a	—N/a				—N/a										1
27	Italy						1			—N/a				—N/a	—N/a				—N/a										1
27	Jordan									—N/a				—N/a	—N/a				—N/a					1					1
27	Luxembourg									—N/a				—N/a	—N/a		1		—N/a										1
27	Mauritius									—N/a			1	—N/a	—N/a				—N/a										1
27	Morocco		1							—N/a				—N/a	—N/a				—N/a										1
27	Serbia									—N/a				—N/a	—N/a				—N/a				1						1
27	Slovenia									—N/a				—N/a	—N/a				—N/a				1						1
27	Suriname									—N/a				—N/a	—N/a		1		—N/a										1
27	Ukraine									—N/a				—N/a	—N/a				—N/a		1								1
27	United States				1					—N/a				—N/a	—N/a				—N/a										1
27	Zambia									—N/a				—N/a	—N/a				—N/a							1			1

=== Players with multiple titles ===
In alphabetical order.

Rank	Player	MS	WS	MD	WD	XD	Total
1	(Azerbaijan) Ade Resky Dwicahyo	3		4			7
2	(Azerbaijan) Azmy Qowimuramadhoni	1		4			5
3	(Estonia) Kristin Kuuba		2		2		4
3	(Peru) Daniela Macias		2		2		4
5	(Nigeria) Dorcas Adesokan		2			1	3
5	(South Africa) Jennifer Fry				1	2	3
5	(Bulgaria) Mariya Mitsova		1			2	3
5	(Peru) Danica Nishimura				2	1	3
