= 2017 European Junior Badminton Championships – Boys' singles =

2017 European Junior Badminton Championships – Boys' Singles
Tournament details
- Dates: 11 – 16 April 2017
- Edition: 26
- Venue: Centre Sportif Regional D’Alsace
- Location: Mulhouse, France

The Boys' Singles tournament of the 2017 European Junior Badminton Championships was held from April 11-16. Anders Antonsen from Denmark clinched this title in the last edition. Toma Junior Popov from France leads the seedings this year.

== Seeded ==
1. (France) Toma Junior Popov (champions)
2. (France) Arnaud Merklé (finals)
3. (Slovenia) Miha Ivanič (fourth round)
4. (Czech Republic) Jan Louda (quarter-finals)
5. (Republic of Ireland) Nhat Nguyen (quarter-finals)
6. (Romania) Collins Valentine Filimon (fourth round)
7. (France) Léo Rossi (quarter-finals)
8. (Bulgaria) Daniel Nikolov (third round)
9. (Ukraine) Danylo Bosniuk (third round)
10. (Italy) Fabio Caponio (third round)
11. (Germany) Samuel Hsiao (third round)
12. (Spain) Alvaro Vazquez (second round)
13. (Portugal) Miguel Rocha (second round)
14. (England) David Jones (semi-finals)
15. (Slovenia) Rok Jercinovic (fourth round)
16. (Bulgaria) Dimitar Yanakiev (second round)

== Draw ==
=== Finals ===
Quarterfinals
1	(France) Toma Junior Popov	21	21
5	(Republic of Ireland) Nhat Nguyen	15	15
14	(England) David Jones	21	21
(Czech Republic) Ondřej Král	12	14
(Netherlands) Joran Kweekel	16	21	21
4	(Czech Republic) Jan Louda	21	17	17
7	(France) Leo Rossi	20	23
2	(France) Arnaud Merklé	22	25

Semifinals
1	(France) Toma Junior Popov	21	21
14	(England) David Jones	12	18
(Netherlands) Joran Kweekel	11	21	14
2	(France) Arnaud Merklé	21	14	21

Final
1	(France) Toma Junior Popov	21	21
2	(France) Arnaud Merklé	14	15

=== Top half ===
==== Section 1 ====
First round

Second round
1	(France) T J Popov	21	21
(Israel) M Bar Netzer	8	17
(Denmark) M Thogersen	21	21
(Estonia) K Kert	12	8
16	(Bulgaria) D Yanakiev	21	16	19
(Belgium) E Bracke	19	21	21
(Netherlands) S Li	21	21
(Norway) M Xu	10	15

Third round
1	(France) T J Popov	21	21
(Denmark) M Thogersen	13	17
(Belgium) E Bracke	21	21
(Netherlands) S Li	19	18

Fourth round
1	(France) T J Popov	21	21
(Belgium) E Bracke	12	17

==== Section 2 ====
First round
(Poland) M Kikosicki	21	15	20
(Russia) N Lemeshko	19	21	22

Second round
5	(Republic of Ireland) N Nguyen	21	21
(Latvia) N Podosinoviks	10	10
(Germany) L Resch	15	10
(Ukraine) O Shmundyak	21	21
13	(Portugal) M Rocha	21	16	18
(Scotland) M Grimley	19	21	21
(Lithuania) M Sames	15	9
(Russia) N Lemeshko	21	21

Third round
5	(Republic of Ireland) N Nguyen	21	21
(Ukraine) O Shmundyak	8	17
(Scotland) M Grimley	21	21	17
(Russia) N Lemeshko	14	23	21

Fourth round
5	(Republic of Ireland) N Nguyen	21	21
(Russia) N Lemeshko	4	8

==== Section 3 ====
First round

Second round
3	(Slovenia) M Ivanič	12	21	21
(Finland) J Paul	21	9	12
(Austria) N Rudolf	21	21
(Azerbaijan) M Bayramov	14	7
14	(England) D Jones	21	19	21
(Germany) F Hammes	17	21	6
(Slovakia) R Smatlak	10	11
(Sweden) V Aglinder	21	21

Third round
3	(Slovenia) M Ivanič	21	21
(Austria) N Rudolf	14	16
14	(England) D Jones	21	21
(Sweden) V Aglinder	13	8

Fourth round
3	(Slovenia) M Ivanič	16	13
14	(England) D Jones	21	21

==== Section 4 ====
First round
(Switzerland) T Kuenzi	21	21
(Hungary) A Morocz	11	7

Second round
6	(Romania) C V Filimon	21	21
(Turkey) K Sadi	11	10
(Netherlands) T Sibbald	22	17	11
(Russia) M Lavrikov	20	21	21
12	(Spain) A Vazquez	18	16
(Czech Republic) O Král	21	21
(Denmark) K T Sondergaard	21	21
(Switzerland) T Kuenzi	13	8

Third round
6	(Romania) C V Filimon	21	21
(Russia) M Lavrikov	13	14
(Czech Republic) O Král	18	21	21
(Denmark) K T Sondergaard	21	17	14

Fourth round
6	(Romania) C V Filimon	25	4
(Czech Republic) O Král	27	21

=== Bottom half ===
==== Section 5 ====
First round
(Estonia) M Loo	21	12
(Greece) A Bittner	23	21

Second round
(Greece) A Bittner	14	17
(Spain) M Barbado	21	21
(Republic of Ireland) A McAllister	18	8
11	(Germany) S Hsiao	21	21
(Switzerland) J Scheiwiller	10	18
(Netherlands) J Kweekel	21	21
(Sweden) O Svensson	9	8
8	(Bulgaria) D Nikolov	21	21

Third round
(Spain) M Barbado	21	16	21
11	(Germany) S Hsiao	16	21	14
(Netherlands) J Kweekel	21	21
8	(Bulgaria) D Nikolov	17	10

Fourth round
(Spain) M Barbado	9	10
(Netherlands) J Kweekel	21	21

==== Section 6 ====
First round
(Hungary) G Pytel	21	21
(Portugal) C A Silva	5	11

Second round
(Hungary) G Pytel	21	21
(Scotland) C Pringle	13	15
(Latvia) K Kalnins	16	6
15	(Slovenia) R Jercinovic	21	21
(Austria) P Drexler	11	11
(England) Z Russ	21	21
(Slovakia) P Hrncar	14	4
4	(Czech Republic) J Louda	21	21

Third round
(Hungary) G Pytel	15	19
15	(Slovenia) R Jercinovic	21	21
(England) Z Russ	16	17
4	(Czech Republic) J Louda	21	21

Fourth round
15	(Slovenia) R Jercinovic	11	17
4	(Czech Republic) J Louda	21	21

==== Section 7 ====
First round
(Poland) M Sobolewski	6	21
(Spain) A Alcala	21	23

Second round
(Spain) A Alcala	21	21
(Denmark) J Toft	11	5
(Turkey) Y Yasar	9	15
10	(Italy) F Caponio	21	21
(Serbia) L Milic	21	21
(Belarus) I Larushin	13	9
(Norway) M Barth	16	13
7	(France) L Rossi	21	21

Third round
(Spain) A Alcala	21	21
10	(Italy) F Caponio	18	14
(Serbia) L Milic	18	14
7	(France) L Rossi	21	21

Fourth round
(Spain) A Alcala	12	10
7	(France) L Rossi	21	21

==== Section 8 ====
First round

Second round
(Turkey) B Cicen	17	13
(England) J Torjussen	21	21
(Croatia) F Jagar	14	6
9	(Ukraine) D Bosniuk	21	21
(Belgium) J Carraggi	16	21	21
(Finland) A Monnberg	21	11	14
(Russia) G Karpov	10	19
2	(France) A Merklé	21	21

Third round
(England) J Torjussen	15	23	23
9	(Ukraine) D Bosniuk	21	21	21
(Belgium) J Carraggi	13	21	15
2	(France) A Merklé	21	12	21

Fourth round
(England) J Torjussen	14	21	15
2	(France) A Merklé	21	14	21
