= 2020 BWF Continental Circuit =

Tournament details
- Dates: 7 January – 13 December
- Edition: 14th

The 2020 BWF Continental Circuit was the fourteenth season of the BWF Continental Circuit of badminton, a circuit of 14 tournaments. The 14 tournaments are divided into three levels:

- International Challenge (2 tournaments)
- International Series (6 tournaments)
- Future Series (6 tournaments).

Each of these tournaments offers different ranking points and prize money.

== Points distribution ==
Below is the point distribution table for each phase of the tournament based on the BWF points system for the BWF Continental Circuit events.

Tournament	Winner	Runner-up	3/4	5/8	9/16	17/32	33/64	65/128	129/256
International Challenge	4,000	3,400	2,800	2,200	1,520	920	360	170	70
International Series	2,500	2,130	1,750	1,370	920	550	210	100	40
Future Series	1,700	1,420	1,170	920	600	350	130	60	20

== Results ==
Below is the schedule released by Badminton World Federation:

=== Winners ===
==== International Challenge ====
Tour	Men's singles	Women's singles	Men's doubles	Women's doubles	Mixed doubles
Iran Fajr International	(Canada) Sheng Xiaodong	(United States) Crystal Pan	(Iran) Soroush Eskandari Vatannejad (Iran) Amir Jabbari	(Iran) Nasim Safaei (Iran) Hananeh Yaghobzadeh	—N/a
Austrian International	(Germany) Max Weißkirchen	(Japan) Yukino Nakai	(Scotland) Alexander Dunn (Scotland) Adam Hall	(Japan) Tsukiko Yasaki (Japan) Erika Yokoyama	(Denmark) Jeppe Bay (Denmark) Sara Lundgaard
Polish Open	Cancelled (Note: Update on Tournaments Grade 2, 3 and Junior cancelled due to COVID-19 pandemic.)				
Canadian International	Cancelled (Note: BWF announces a revamped 2020 tournament calendar due to COVID-19 pandemic.)				
Osaka International	Cancelled				
Finnish Open	Cancelled				
Denmark International	Cancelled				
Mongolia International	Cancelled				
Lagos International	Cancelled (Note: Updates 18 September 2020, tournaments cancelled due to COVID-19 pandemic.)				
Azerbaijan International	Cancelled (Note: This tournament, originally to be played from 16 to 19 July, was later cancelled due to the COVID-19 pandemic.)				
Belgian International	Cancelled (Note: Tournament update 3 European tournaments cancelled due to COVID-19 pandemic.)				
Maldives International	Cancelled				
Spanish International	Cancelled				
Myanmar International	Cancelled				
Czech International	Cancelled				
Indonesia International	Cancelled				
Vietnam International	Cancelled (Note: This tournament, originally to be played from 24 to 29 March, was later postponed to 2–7 June due to COVID-19 pandemic in Vietnam before getting another schedule. It was officially cancelled on 10 July 2020.)				
Hungarian International	Cancelled (Note: Updates 11 September 2020, tournaments cancelled due to COVID-19 pandemic.)				
Malaysia International	Cancelled				
India International	Cancelled (Note: Updates 8 September 2020, tournaments cancelled due to COVID-19 pandemic.)				
Scottish Open	Cancelled (Note: Updates 7 August 2020, tournaments cancelled due to COVID-19 pandemic.)				
Bangladesh International	Cancelled				
White Nights	Cancelled (Note: Updates 25 August 2020, tournaments cancelled due to COVID-19 pandemic.)				
Italian International	Cancelled (Note: Updates 2 October 2020, tournaments cancelled or postponed due to COVID-19 pandemic.)				

==== International Series ====
Tour	Men's singles	Women's singles	Men's doubles	Women's doubles	Mixed doubles
Estonian International	(Japan) Hashiru Shimono	(Japan) Natsuki Nidaira	(Chinese Taipei) Chiang Chien-wei (Chinese Taipei) Ye Hong-wei	(Japan) Rena Miyaura (Japan) Saori Ozaki	(Japan) Yujiro Nishikawa (Japan) Saori Ozaki
Swedish Open	(Denmark) Victor Svendsen	(Japan) Natsuki Nidaira	(Chinese Taipei) Chiang Chien-wei (Chinese Taipei) Ye Hong-wei	(Denmark) Julie Finne-Ipsen (Denmark) Mai Surrow	(Japan) Yujiro Nishikawa (Japan) Saori Ozaki
Lao International	Cancelled				
Uganda International	(Hungary) Gergely Krausz	(Myanmar) Thet Htar Thuzar	(India) Tarun Kona (India) Shivam Sharma	(India) Meghana Jakkampudi (India) Poorvisha S. Ram	(India) Tarun Kona (India) Meghana Jakkampudi
Jamaica International	(Japan) Takuma Obayashi	(Japan) Momoka Kimura	(Guatemala) Aníbal Marroquín (Guatemala) Jonathan Solís	(Japan) Sayaka Hobara (Japan) Rena Miyaura	(Guatemala) Jonathan Solís (Guatemala) Diana Corleto
KaBaL International Karviná	Cancelled				
Waikato International	Cancelled				
Dutch International	Cancelled				
Peru International	Cancelled				
Slovenian International	Cancelled				
Malaysia International Series	Cancelled				
Bulgarian International	Cancelled				
Kharkiv International	Cancelled				
Bendigo International	Cancelled (Note: Two Australian tournaments cancelled in September due to the COVID-19 pandemic.)				
Polish International	Cancelled				
Guatemala International	Cancelled				
Bahrain International	Cancelled (Note: Updates 10 July 2020, tournaments cancelled due to COVID-19 pandemic.)				
Cameroon International	Cancelled				
Brazil International	Cancelled (Note: Updates 24 July 2020, tournaments cancelled due to COVID-19 pandemic.)				
Santo Domingo Open	Cancelled (Note: Two Pan Am Tournaments Cancelled in October due to COVID-19 pandemic in the Dominican Republic.)				
Kazakhstan International	Cancelled				
Norwegian International	Cancelled				
Portugal International	(France) Brice Leverdez	(Switzerland) Sabrina Jaquet	(France) Lucas Corvée (France) Brice Leverdez	(Scotland) Lauren Middleton (Scotland) Holly Newall	(Scotland) Christopher Grimley (Scotland) Eleanor O'Donnell
Suriname International	Cancelled				
Irish Open	Cancelled				
International Mexicano	(Mexico) Job Castillo	(Mexico) Sabrina Solís	(Mexico) Job Castillo (Mexico) Sebastián Martínez	(Mexico) Jessica Bautista (Mexico) Vanessa Villalobos	(Mexico) Andrés López (Mexico) Sabrina Solis
Welsh International	Cancelled				
Vietnam International Series	Cancelled				
Bangabandhu International Series	Cancelled (Note: Updates 14 November 2020, tournaments cancelled or postponed due to COVID-19 pandemic.)				
Turkey Open	Cancelled				

==== Future Series ====
Tour	Men's singles	Women's singles	Men's doubles	Women's doubles	Mixed doubles
Iceland International	(Indonesia) Fathurrahman Fauzi	(Scotland) Rachel Sugden	(Finland) Anton Monnberg (Finland) Jesper Paul	(England) Asmita Chaudhari (England) Pamela Reyes	(England) Alex Green (England) Annie Lado
Slovak International	(Czech Republic) Jan Louda	(Chinese Taipei) Lin Jhih-yun	(Chinese Taipei) Lin Shang-kai (Chinese Taipei) Tseng Min-hao	(Chinese Taipei) Lee Chia-hsin (Chinese Taipei) Lin Jhih-yun	(Chinese Taipei) Lu Ming-che (Chinese Taipei) Wu Ti-jung
Kenya International	(India) Chirag Sen	(India) Aakarshi Kashyap	(India) Kathiravun Concheepuran Manivannan (India) Santhosh Gajendran	(Egypt) Doha Hany (Egypt) Hadia Hosny	(Egypt) Adham Hatem Elgamal (Egypt) Doha Hany
Peru Future Series	(Japan) Yushi Tanaka	(Japan) Momoka Kimura	(Guatemala) Rubén Castellanos (Guatemala) Christopher Martínez	(Peru) Daniela Macías (Peru) Dánica Nishimura	(Peru) Daniel la Torre (Peru) Paula la Torre
Giraldilla International	Cancelled				
North Harbour International	Cancelled				
Lithuanian International	Cancelled				
German International	Cancelled				
Styrian International	Cancelled				
Latvia International	(Estonia) Mihkel Laanes	(Estonia) Catlyn Kruus	(Estonia) Mikk Järveoja (Estonia) Mihkel Laanes	(Estonia) Kati-Kreet Marran (Estonia) Helina Rüütel	(Estonia) Mihkel Laanes (Estonia) Helina Rüütel
Kathmandu International	Cancelled (Note: Update on tournaments cancelled due to COVID-19 pandemic.)				
Sydney International	Cancelled				
Maldives Future Series	Cancelled				
Benin International	Cancelled				
Croatian International	Cancelled				
Bulgarian International	(Croatia) Luka Ban	(Bulgaria) Linda Zetchiri	(Bulgaria) Daniel Nikolov (Bulgaria) Ivan Rusev	(Bulgaria) Gabriela Stoeva (Bulgaria) Stefani Stoeva	(Bulgaria) Iliyan Stoynov (Bulgaria) Hristomira Popovska
Myanmar Future Series	Cancelled				
Bahrain Future Series	Cancelled				
Cyprus International	Cancelled				
Chile International	Cancelled				
Egypt International	Cancelled (Note: Tournament updates 7 July 2020.)				
Israel International	Cancelled				
Algeria International	Cancelled				
Guatemala Future Series	Cancelled				
Slovenia Future Series	Cancelled (Note: Updates 27 October 2020, tournaments cancelled or postponed due to COVID-19 pandemic.)				
Costa Rica Future Series	Cancelled				
Botswana International	Cancelled				
Zambia International	Cancelled				
South Africa International	Cancelled				
El Salvador International	Cancelled (Note: Updates 5 November 2020, tournaments cancelled or postponed due to COVID-19 pandemic.)				

== Statistics ==
=== Performance by countries ===
Below are the 2020 BWF Continental Circuit performances by country. Only countries who have won a title are listed:

==== International Challenge ====
Rank	Team	IRI	AUT	Total
1	Iran	2		2
1	Japan		2	2
3	Canada	1		1
3	Denmark		1	1
3	Germany		1	1
3	Scotland		1	1
3	United States	1		1

==== International Series ====
Rank	Team	EST	SWE	UGA	JAM	POR	MEX	Total
1	Japan	4	2		3			9
2	Mexico						5	5
3	India			3				3
4	Chinese Taipei	1	1					2
4	Denmark		2					2
4	France					2		2
4	Guatemala				2			2
4	Scotland					2		2
9	Hungary			1				1
9	Myanmar			1				1
9	Switzerland					1		1

==== Future Series ====
Rank	Team	ISL	SVK	KEN	PER	LAT	BUL	Total
1	Estonia					5		5
2	Bulgaria						4	4
2	Chinese Taipei		4					4
4	India			3				3
5	Egypt			2				2
5	England	2						2
5	Japan				2			2
5	Peru				2			2
9	Croatia						1	1
9	Czech Republic		1					1
9	Finland	1						1
9	Guatemala				1			1
9	Indonesia	1						1
9	Scotland	1						1

=== Performance by categories ===
To avoid confusion and double counting, information in this table shall only be updated once a tournament has concluded. These tables were calculated after the XD (5/5) of International Mexicano.

==== Men's singles ====
Rank	Player	IC	IS	FS	Total
1	(Canada) Xiaodong Sheng	1			1
1	(Germany) Max Weißkirchen	1			1
3	(Denmark) Victor Svendsen		1		1
3	(France) Brice Leverdez		1		1
3	(Hungary) Gergely Krausz		1		1
3	(Japan) Takuma Obayashi		1		1
3	(Japan) Hashiru Shimono		1		1
3	(Mexico) Job Castillo		1		1
9	(Croatia) Luka Ban			1	1
9	(Czech Republic) Jan Louda			1	1
9	(Estonia) Mihkel Laanes			1	1
9	(India) Chirag Sen			1	1
9	(Indonesia) Fathurrahman Fauzi			1	1
9	(Japan) Yushi Tanaka			1	1

==== Women's singles ====
Rank	Player	IC	IS	FS	Total
1	(Japan) Natsuki Nidaira		2		2
2	(Japan) Momoka Kimura		1	1	2
3	(Japan) Yukino Nakai	1			1
3	(United States) Crystal Pan	1			1
5	(Mexico) Sabrina Solís		1		1
5	(Myanmar) Thet Htar Thuzar		1		1
5	(Switzerland) Sabrina Jaquet		1		1
8	(Bulgaria) Linda Zetchiri			1	1
8	(Chinese Taipei) Lin Jhih-yun			1	1
8	(Estonia) Catlyn Kruus			1	1
8	(India) Aakarshi Kashyap			1	1
8	(Scotland) Rachel Sugden			1	1

==== Men's doubles ====
Rank	Players	IC	IS	FS	Total
1	(Chinese Taipei) Chiang Chien-wei		2		2
1	(Chinese Taipei) Ye Hong-wei		2		2
3	(Iran) Soroush Eskandari Vatannejad	1			1
3	(Iran) Amir Jabbari	1			1
3	(Scotland) Alexander Dunn	1			1
3	(Scotland) Adam Hall	1			1
7	(France) Lucas Corvée		1		1
7	(France) Brice Leverdez		1		1
7	(Guatemala) Aníbal Marroquín		1		1
7	(Guatemala) Jonathan Solís		1		1
7	(India) Tarun Kona		1		1
7	(India) Shivam Sharma		1		1
7	(Mexico) Job Castillo		1		1
7	(Mexico) Sebastián Martínez		1		1
15	(Bulgaria) Daniel Nikolov			1	1
15	(Bulgaria) Ivan Rusev			1	1
15	(Chinese Taipei) Lin Shang-kai			1	1
15	(Chinese Taipei) Tseng Min-hao			1	1
15	(Estonia) Mikk Järveoja			1	1
15	(Estonia) Mihkel Laanes			1	1
15	(Finland) Anton Monnberg			1	1
15	(Finland) Jesper Paul			1	1
15	(Guatemala) Rubén Castellanos			1	1
15	(Guatemala) Christopher Martínez			1	1
15	(India) Santhosh Gajendran			1	1
15	(India) Kathiravun Concheepuran Manivannan			1	1

==== Women's doubles ====
Rank	Players	IC	IS	FS	Total
1	(Japan) Rena Miyaura		2		2
2	(Iran) Nasim Safaei	1			1
2	(Iran) Hananeh Yaghobzadeh	1			1
2	(Japan) Tsukiko Yasaki	1			1
2	(Japan) Erika Yokoyama	1			1
6	(Denmark) Julie Finne-Ipsen		1		1
6	(Denmark) Mai Surrow		1		1
6	(India) Meghana Jakkampudi		1		1
6	(India) Poorvisha S. Ram		1		1
6	(Japan) Sayaka Hobara		1		1
6	(Japan) Saori Ozaki		1		1
6	(Mexico) Jessica Bautista		1		1
6	(Mexico) Vanessa Villalobos		1		1
6	(Scotland) Lauren Middleton		1		1
6	(Scotland) Holly Newall		1		1
16	(Bulgaria) Gabriela Stoeva			1	1
16	(Bulgaria) Stefani Stoeva			1	1
16	(Chinese Taipei) Lee Chia-hsin			1	1
16	(Chinese Taipei) Lin Jhih-yun			1	1
16	(Egypt) Doha Hany			1	1
16	(Egypt) Hadia Hosny			1	1
16	(England) Asmita Chaudhari			1	1
16	(England) Pamela Reyes			1	1
16	(Estonia) Kati-Kreet Marran			1	1
16	(Estonia) Helina Rüütel			1	1
16	(Peru) Daniela Macías			1	1
16	(Peru) Dánica Nishimura			1	1

==== Mixed doubles ====
Rank	Players	IC	IS	FS	Total
1	(Japan) Yujiro Nishikawa		2		2
1	(Japan) Saori Ozaki		2		2
3	(Denmark) Jeppe Bay	1			1
3	(Denmark) Sara Lundgaard	1			1
5	(Guatemala) Jonathan Solís		1		1
5	(Guatemala) Diana Corleto Soto		1		1
5	(India) Meghana Jakkampudi		1		1
5	(India) Tarun Kona		1		1
5	(Mexico) Andrés López		1		1
5	(Mexico) Sabrina Solis		1		1
5	(Scotland) Christopher Grimley		1		1
5	(Scotland) Eleanor O'Donnell		1		1
13	(Bulgaria) Iliyan Stoynov			1	1
13	(Bulgaria) Hristomira Popovska			1	1
13	(Chinese Taipei) Lu Ming-che			1	1
13	(Chinese Taipei) Wu Ti-jung			1	1
13	(Egypt) Adham Hatem Elgamal			1	1
13	(Egypt) Doha Hany			1	1
13	(England) Alex Green			1	1
13	(England) Annie Lado			1	1
13	(Estonia) Mihkel Laanes			1	1
13	(Estonia) Helina Rüütel			1	1
13	(Peru) Daniel la Torre Regal			1	1
13	(Peru) Paula la Torre Regal			1	1
