= 2017 European Junior Badminton Championships – Boys' doubles =

Tournament details
- Dates: 11 April 2017 – 16 April 2017
- Edition: 25
- Venue: Centre Sportif Régional d'Alsace
- Location: Mulhouse, France

The Boys' doubles tournament of the 2017 European Junior Badminton Championships was held from April 11–16. Dane doubles Alexander Bond and Joel Eipe clinched this title in the last edition. French Thom Gicquel / Toma Junior Popov leads the seedings this year.

== Seeded ==
1. (France) Thom Gicquel / Toma Junior Popov (gold medalist)
2. (Poland) Robert Cybulski / Paweł Śmiłowski (bronze medalists)
3. (Republic of Ireland) Nhat Nguyen / Paul Reynolds (quarter-finals)
4. (Scotland) Christopher Grimley / Matthew Grimley (quarter-finals)
5. (Sweden) Adam Gozzi / Carl Harrbacka (second round)
6. (Russia) Rodion Alimov / Pavel Kotsarenko (second round)
7. (Czech Republic) Petr Beran / Ondřej Král (quarter-finals)
8. (France) Thomas Baures / Léo Rossi (second round)

== Draw ==
=== Finals ===
Semi-finals
1	(France) Thom Gicquel (France) Toma Junior Popov	21	21
SUB	(Denmark) Daniel Laundgaard (Denmark) Jesper Toft	14	18
(England) Max Flynn (England) Callum Hemming	21	21
2	(Poland) Robert Cybulski (Poland) Paweł Śmiłowski	14	15

Final
1	(France) Thom Gicquel (France) Toma Junior Popov	21	21
(England) Max Flynn (England) Callum Hemming	17	13

=== Section 1 ===
First round
(Republic of Ireland) A McAllister (Republic of Ireland) B O'Mahony	18	13
(Spain) P Alfayate (Spain) A Bernat	21	21
(Slovakia) A Horak (Slovakia) P Hrnčár	21	21
(Azerbaijan) M Bayramov (Azerbaijan) S Huseynov	8	8
(Poland) K Ploch (Poland) R Wróbel	19	18
(Austria) P Drexler (Austria) N Rudolf	21	21
(Lithuania) L Borusas (Lithuania) J Petkus	16	17
(Latvia) K Kalnis (Latvia) N Podosinoviks	21	21

Second round
1	(France) T Gicquel (France) T J Popov	21	21
(Spain) P Alfayate (Spain) A Bernat	15	14
(England) Z Russ (England) S Stallwood	21	21
(Slovakia) A Horak (Slovakia) P Hrnčár	16	16
7	(Czech Republic) P Beran (Czech Republic) O Král	21	21
(Austria) P Drexler (Austria) N Rudolf	16	16
(Estonia) K Kert (Estonia) M Lõo	21	21
(Latvia) K Kalnis (Latvia) N Podosinoviks	16	19

Third round
1	(France) T Gicquel (France) T J Popov	21	21
(England) Z Russ (England) S Stallwood	19	11
7	(Czech Republic) P Beran (Czech Republic) O Král	21	21
(Estonia) K Kert (Estonia) M Lõo	10	17

Quarter-finals
1	(France) T Gicquel (France) T J Popov	21	21
7	(Czech Republic) P Beran (Czech Republic) O Král	11	10

=== Section 2 ===
First round
(Italy) F Caponio (Italy) G Toti	21	21
(Ukraine) R Altunyan (Ukraine) O Chakalov	10	10
(Norway) M Marum (Norway) M Xu	13	18
(Belgium) J Carraggi (Belgium) J van Nieuwkerke	21	21
(Turkey) B Çiçen (Turkey) T Taşdemir	16	13
(Germany) H Graalmann (Germany) J C Völker	21	21
(Croatia) D Doko (Croatia) F Jagar	13	14
SUB	(Denmark) D Lundgaard (Denmark) J Toft	21	21

Second round
4	(Scotland) C Grimley (Scotland) M Grimley	21	21
(Italy) F Caponio (Italy) G Toti	12	15
(Netherlands) S Li (Netherlands) T van der Lecq	w	/	o
(Belgium) J Carraggi (Belgium) J van Nieuwkerke
6	(Russia) R Alimov (Russia) P Kotsarenko	11	17
(Germany) H Graalmann (Germany) J C Völker	21	21
(Finland) J Övermark (Finland) J Paul	20	16
SUB	(Denmark) D Lundgaard (Denmark) J Toft	22	21

Third round
4	(Scotland) C Grimley (Scotland) M Grimley	21	21
(Netherlands) S Li (Netherlands) T van der Lecq	13	13
(Germany) H Graalmann (Germany) J C Völker	19	21	15
SUB	(Denmark) D Lundgaard (Denmark) J Toft	21	15	21

Quarter-finals
4	(Scotland) C Grimley (Scotland) M Grimley	21	19	19
SUB	(Denmark) D Lundgaard (Denmark) J Toft	19	21	21

=== Section 3 ===
First round
SUB	(Serbia) L Milic (Bulgaria) D Nikolov	21	21
(Norway) M Barth (Norway) O H Imset	15	12
(England) M Flynn (England) C Hemming	21	21
(Germany) D Hess (Germany) J Voigt	16	18
(Hungary) Z Dulcz (Hungary) A Mórocz	5	11
(Denmark) P Eriksen (Denmark) M Thøgersen	21	21
(Portugal) M Rocha (Portugal) C A Silva	19	15
(Turkey) S Salim (Turkey) B Yuksel	21	21

Second round
SUB	(Serbia) L Milic (Bulgaria) D Nikolov	21	21
(Slovakia) A Antonska (Slovakia) R Šmatlák	16	15
(England) M Flynn (England) C Hemming	21	21
5	(Sweden) A Gozzi (Sweden) C Harrbacka	9	15
(Denmark) P Eriksen (Denmark) M Thøgersen	21	21
(Finland) J Kilpi (Finland) A Monnberg	12	11
(Turkey) S Salim (Turkey) B Yuksel	19	20
3	(Republic of Ireland) N Nguyen (Republic of Ireland) P Reynolds	21	22

Third round
SUB	(Serbia) L Milic (Bulgaria) D Nikolov	9	14
(England) M Flynn (England) C Hemming	21	21
(Denmark) P Eriksen (Denmark) M Thøgersen	17	17
3	(Republic of Ireland) N Nguyen (Republic of Ireland) P Reynolds	21	21

Quarter-finals
(England) M Flynn (England) C Hemming	21	22
3	(Republic of Ireland) N Nguyen (Republic of Ireland) P Reynolds	10	20

=== Section 4 ===
First round
(Netherlands) G Duijs (Netherlands) T Sibbald	11	16
(Ukraine) M Makhnovskiy (Ukraine) I Medynskiy	21	21
(Czech Republic) M Hubáček (Czech Republic) J Somerlík	21	21
(Austria) P Birker (Austria) J Sorger	17	12
(Russia) G Karpov (Russia) M Lavrikov	21	17	15
(Scotland) A Dunn (Scotland) C Pringle	14	21	21
(Switzerland) D Orteu (Switzerland) J Scheiwiller	17	18
(Slovenia) M Ivančič (Slovenia) R Jerčinovič	21	21

Second round
(Ukraine) M Makhnovskiy (Ukraine) I Medynskiy	11	19
(Bulgaria) I Panev (Bulgaria) D Yanakiev	21	21
(Czech Republic) M Hubáček (Czech Republic) J Somerlík	21	11	21
8	(France) T Baures (France) L Rossi	16	21	19
(Scotland) A Dunn (Scotland) C Pringle	21	21
(Estonia) A Eskor (Estonia) R Sokman	11	8
(Slovenia) M Ivančič (Slovenia) R Jerčinovič	14	18
2	(Poland) R Cybulski (Poland) P Śmiłowski	21	21

Third round
(Bulgaria) I Panev (Bulgaria) D Yanakiev	10	9
(Czech Republic) M Hubáček (Czech Republic) J Somerlík	21	21
(Scotland) A Dunn (Scotland) C Pringle	19	22	21
2	(Poland) R Cybulski (Poland) P Śmiłowski	21	20	23

Quarter-finals
(Czech Republic) M Hubáček (Czech Republic) J Somerlík	21	14	10
2	(Poland) R Cybulski (Poland) P Śmiłowski	19	21	21
