= 2019 Orléans Masters =

2019 badminton tournament in France

Tournament details
- Dates: 19–24 March
- Level: Super 100
- Total prize money: US$75,000
- Venue: Palais des Sports
- Location: Orléans, France

Champions
- Men's singles: (Japan) Koki Watanabe
- Women's singles: (Japan) Saena Kawakami
- Men's doubles: (Chinese Taipei) Lee Yang (Chinese Taipei) Wang Chi-lin
- Women's doubles: (England) Chloe Birch (England) Lauren Smith
- Mixed doubles: (France) Thom Gicquel (France) Delphine Delrue

The 2019 Orléans Masters was a badminton tournament which took place at Palais des Sports in France from 19 to 24 March 2019 and had a total purse of $75,000.

== Tournament ==
The 2019 Orléans Masters was the second Super 100 tournament of the 2019 BWF World Tour and also part of the Orléans Masters championships, which had been held since 2012. This tournament was organized by the Cercle Laïque des Tourelles Orléans (CLTO) Badminton and sanctioned by the BWF and Fédération Française de Badminton.

=== Venue ===
This international tournament was held at Palais des Sports in Orléans, Centre-Val de Loire, France.

=== Point distribution ===
Below is the point distribution table for each phase of the tournament based on the BWF points system for the BWF Tour Super 100 event.

| Winner | Runner-up | 3/4 | 5/8 | 9/16 | 17/32 | 33/64 | 65/128 | 129/256 |
|---|---|---|---|---|---|---|---|---|
| 5,500 | 4,680 | 3,850 | 3,030 | 2,110 | 1,290 | 510 | 240 | 100 |

=== Prize money ===
The total prize money for this tournament was US$75,000. Distribution of prize money was in accordance with BWF regulations.

| Event | Winner | Finals | Semi-finals | Quarter-finals | Last 16 |
| Singles | $5,625 | $2,850 | $1,087.50 | $450 | $262.50 |
| Doubles | $5,925 | $2,850 | $1,050 | $543.75 | $281.25 |

== Men's singles ==
=== Seeds ===
1. (Denmark) Hans-Kristian Vittinghus (withdrew)
2. (Netherlands) Mark Caljouw (semi-finals)
3. (Japan) Yu Igarashi (third round)
4. (France) Lucas Corvée (second round)
5. (Denmark) Victor Svendsen (withdrew)
6. (India) Parupalli Kashyap (third round)
7. (France) Toma Junior Popov (third round)
8. (France) Thomas Rouxel (final)

=== Finals ===
Semi-finals
(Japan) Koki Watanabe | 21 | 21
Q4 | (China) Li Shifeng | 16 | 19
8 | (France) Thomas Rouxel | 21 | 23
2 | (Netherlands) Mark Caljouw | 19 | 21

Final
(Japan) Koki Watanabe | 18 | 21 | 21
8 | (France) Thomas Rouxel | 21 | 12 | 19

=== Top half ===
==== Section 1 ====
First Round
PFQ | (India) H Dani | 21 | 21
(Czech Republic) M Ludík | 19 | 13
Q6 | (Chinese Taipei) Chen C-t | 21 | 17 | 19
Q5 | (India) S Pratap Singh | 18 | 21 | 21
(Italy) R Maddaloni | 21 | 21
PFQ | (Finland) H Aarnio | 15 | 14
(Poland) A Dziółko | 20 | 18
(Japan) K Watanabe | 22 | 21

Second Round
PFQ | (Indonesia) G P F Cupu | 23 | 23 | 21
PFQ | (India) H Dani | 25 | 21 | 14
(India) M Manjunath | 21 | 21
Q5 | (India) S Pratap Singh | 18 | 16
6 | (India) Parupalli K | 21 | 21
(Italy) R Maddaloni | 15 | 17
(Hungary) G Krausz | 12 | 21 | 11
(Japan) K Watanabe | 21 | 18 | 21

Third Round
PFQ | (Indonesia) G P F Cupu | 21 | 21
(India) M Manjunath | 9 | 18
6 | (India) Parupalli K | 14 | 19
(Japan) K Watanabe | 21 | 21

Quarter-finals
PFQ | (Indonesia) G P F Cupu | 10 | 16
(Japan) K Watanabe | 21 | 21

==== Section 2 ====
First Round
(India) L Sen | 21 | 9
(Thailand) K Vitidsarn | 23 | 21
(Canada) XD Sheng | 19 | 14
(Poland) M Rogalski | 21 | 21
(Russia) S Sirant | 16 | 17
Q7 | (England) A Lane | 21 | 21
Q4 | (China) Li SF | 21 | 21
(Belgium) M Moreels | 17 | 15

Second Round
4 | (France) L Corvée | 21 | 11
(Thailand) K Vitidsarn | 23 | 21
(Spain) L E Peñalver | 21 | 21
(Poland) M Rogalski | 16 | 17
PFQ | (Czech Republic) J Louda | 14 | 17
(England) A Lane | 21 | 21
Q3 | (China) Ren PB | 12 | 21 | 18
Q4 | (China) Li SF | 21 | 19 | 21

Third Round
(Thailand) K Vitidsarn | 21 | 21 | 15
(Spain) L E Peñalver | 23 | 9 | 21
(England) A Lane | 22 | 15
Q4 | (China) Li SF | 24 | 21

Quarter-finals
(Spain) L E Peñalver | 19 | 14
Q4 | (China) Li SF | 21 | 21

=== Bottom half ===
==== Section 3 ====
First Round
(India) A Jayaram | 21 | 21
(Mauritius) G Paul | 11 | 12
(China) Sun FX | 21 | 21
PFQ | (Germany) L Schänzler | 12 | 19
(France) L Claerbout | 13 | 21 | 21
Q8 | (Chinese Taipei) Kan C-y | 21 | 16 | 15
Q1 | (France) C Popov | 21 | 17 | 12
(Chinese Taipei) Lin Y-h | 16 | 21 | 21

Second Round
(India) A Jayaram | 21 | 21
(India) G Dutt | 18 | 17
(China) Sun FX | 21 | 13 | 16
8 | (France) T Rouxel | 14 | 21 | 21
(France) L Claerbout | 15 | 21 | 20
(Finland) E Heino | 21 | 19 | 22
(Chinese Taipei) Lin Y-h | 14 | 11
3 | (Japan) Y Igarashi | 21 | 21

Third Round
(India) A Jayaram | 10 | 17
8 | (France) T Rouxel | 21 | 21
(Finland) E Heino | 22 | 24
3 | (Japan) Y Igarashi | 20 | 22

Quarter-finals
8 | (France) T Rouxel | 26 | 21 | 21
(Finland) E Heino | 28 | 14 | 18

==== Section 4 ====
First Round
(Denmark) K Bruun | 18 | 18
(Republic of Ireland) N Nguyen | 21 | 21
(India) S Verma | 22 | 14 | 3^{r}
Q2 | (Bulgaria) D Nikolov | 20 | 21 | 14
(England) S Parsons | 17 | 15
(Germany) K Schäfer | 21 | 21
(Azerbaijan) A R Dwicahyo | 9 | 16
(Malaysia) Goh G C | 21 | 21

Second Round
(Republic of Ireland) N Nguyen | 21 | 21
(Germany) A Roovers | 10 | 16
Q2 | (Bulgaria) D Nikolov | 18 | 15
7 | (France) T J Popov | 21 | 21
(Germany) K Schäfer | 21 | 21
(Malaysia) Soo T Z | 15 | 8
(Malaysia) Goh G C | 23 | 11 | 12
2 | (Netherlands) M Caljouw | 21 | 21 | 21

Third Round
(Republic of Ireland) N Nguyen | 21 | 15 | 21
7 | (France) T J Popov | 17 | 21 | 13
(Germany) K Schäfer | 17 | 19
2 | (Netherlands) M Caljouw | 21 | 21

Quarter-finals
(Republic of Ireland) N Nguyen | 13 | 18
2 | (Netherlands) M Caljouw | 21 | 21

== Women's singles ==
=== Seeds ===
1. (Scotland) Kirsty Gilmour (final)
2. (Japan) Saena Kawakami (champion)
3. (Japan) Ayumi Mine (quarter-finals)
4. (England) Chloe Birch (first round)
5. (Turkey) Neslihan Yiğit (semi-finals)
6. (Switzerland) Sabrina Jaquet (quarter-finals)
7. (Bulgaria) Linda Zetchiri (second round)
8. (France) Qi Xuefei (quarter-finals)

=== Finals ===
Semi-finals
1 | (Scotland) Kirsty Gilmour | 23 | 21 | 21
5 | (Turkey) Neslihan Yiğit | 25 | 17 | 12
(Chinese Taipei) Sung Shuo-yun | 15 | 13
2 | (Japan) Saena Kawakami | 21 | 21

Final
1 | (Scotland) Kirsty Gilmour | 8 | 21 | 16
2 | (Japan) Saena Kawakami | 21 | 18 | 21

=== Top half ===
==== Section 1 ====
First Round
1 | (Scotland) K Gilmour | 21 | 21
(Canada) B Tam | 12 | 10
(Spain) S Peñalver | 11 | 16
(Belgium) L Tan | 21 | 21
6 | (Switzerland) S Jaquet | 21 | 21
Q2 | (India) V Choudhari | 16 | 19
(India) S K P Kudaravalli | 16 | 22 | 13
(India) M Agrey | 21 | 20 | 21

Second Round
1 | (Scotland) K Gilmour | 25 | 21
(Belgium) L Tan | 23 | 11
6 | (Switzerland) S Jaquet | 21 | 21
(India) M Agrey | 10 | 19

Quarter-finals
1 | (Scotland) K Gilmour | 21 | 21
6 | (Switzerland) S Jaquet | 18 | 16

==== Section 2 ====
First Round
3 | (Japan) A Mine | 21 | 21
(Netherlands) G Mahulette | 15 | 6
(Israel) K Polikarpova | 21 | 21
(India) V Gummadi | 11 | 12
5 | (Turkey) N Yiğit | 21 | 21
(United States) C Pan | 9 | 12
(Mauritius) K Foo Kune | 16 | 22
(Indonesia) Choirunnisa | 21 | 24

Second Round
3 | (Japan) A Mine | 21 | 21
(Israel) K Polikarpova | 9 | 12
5 | (Turkey) N Yiğit | 21 | 21
(Indonesia) Choirunnisa | 12 | 14

Quarter-finals
3 | (Japan) A Mine | 16 | 20
5 | (Turkey) N Yiğit | 21 | 22

=== Bottom half ===
==== Section 3 ====
First Round
Q3 | (Spain) C Azurmendi | 21 | 21
Q4 | (Russia) A Semenova | 11 | 13
(Bulgaria) M Mitsova | 21 | 12 | 11
8 | (France) Qi XF | 19 | 21 | 21
(Russia) N Perminova | 15 | 19
Q1 | (France) M Batomene | 21 | 21
(Chinese Taipei) Sung S-y | 21 | 21
4 | (England) C Birch | 12 | 16

Second Round
Q3 | (Spain) C Azurmendi | 24 | 16 | 19
8 | (France) Qi XF | 22 | 21 | 21
Q1 | (France) M Batomene | 11 | 14
(Chinese Taipei) Sung S-y | 21 | 21

Quarter-finals
8 | (France) Qi XF | 12 | 16
(Chinese Taipei) Sung S-y | 21 | 21

==== Section 4 ====
First Round
(Estonia) K Kuuba | 21 | 21
(India) S U R Chukka | 12 | 17
(Slovakia) M Repiská | 21 | 18 | 17
7 | (Bulgaria) L Zetchiri | 14 | 21 | 21
(Netherlands) S de Visch Eijbergen | 18 | 11
(Thailand) P Buranaprasertsuk | 21 | 21
PFQ | (United States) I Zhong | 10 | 8
2 | (Japan) S Kawakami | 21 | 21

Second Round
(Estonia) K Kuuba | 21 | 21
7 | (Bulgaria) L Zetchiri | 10 | 15
(Thailand) P Buranaprasertsuk | 18 | 11
2 | (Japan) S Kawakami | 21 | 21

Quarter-finals
(Estonia) K Kuuba | 7 | 14
2 | (Japan) S Kawakami | 21 | 21

== Men's doubles ==
=== Seeds ===
1. (England) Marcus Ellis / Chris Langridge (first round)
2. (Denmark) Mathias Boe / Carsten Mogensen (withdrew)
3. (Germany) Mark Lamsfuß / Marvin Emil Seidel (withdrew)
4. (England) Ben Lane / Sean Vendy (quarter-finals)
5. (Chinese Taipei) Lee Yang / Wang Chi-lin (champions)
6. (Japan) Akira Koga / Taichi Saito (final)
7. (France) Thom Gicquel / Ronan Labar (second round)
8. (Japan) Hiroki Okamura / Masayuki Onodera (first round)

=== Finals ===
Semi-finals
6 | (Japan) Akira Koga (Japan) Taichi Saito | 21 | 21
(Chinese Taipei) Lee Fang-chih (Chinese Taipei) Lu Chia-pin | 11 | 13
5 | (Chinese Taipei) Lee Yang (Chinese Taipei) Wang Chi-lin | 21 | 21
(Scotland) Alexander Dunn (Scotland) Adam Hall | 13 | 11

Final
6 | (Japan) Akira Koga (Japan) Taichi Saito | 21 | 20 | 15
5 | (Chinese Taipei) Lee Yang (Chinese Taipei) Wang Chi-lin | 16 | 22 | 21

=== Top half ===
==== Section 1 ====
First Round
1 | (England) M Ellis (England) C Langridge | 19 | 21 | 19
(Russia) N Khakimov (Russia) A Zinchenko | 21 | 8 | 21
(Chinese Taipei) Chang K-c (Chinese Taipei) Lee F-j | 11 | 21 | 21
(Thailand) S Jomkoh (Thailand) W Sothon | 21 | 18 | 17
6 | (Japan) A Koga (Japan) T Saito | 21 | 21
(Azerbaijan) A R Dwicahyo (Azerbaijan) A Qowimuramadhoni | 8 | 12
Q3 | (England) C Hemming (England) T Wolfenden | 21 | 23 | 21
(Russia) D Grachev (Russia) P Kotsarenko | 9 | 25 | 13

Second Round
(Russia) N Khakimov (Russia) A Zinchenko | 20 | 13
(Chinese Taipei) Chang K-c (Chinese Taipei) Lee F-j | 22 | 21
6 | (Japan) A Koga (Japan) T Saito | 21 | 23
Q3 | (England) C Hemming (England) T Wolfenden | 18 | 21

Quarter-finals
(Chinese Taipei) Chang K-c (Chinese Taipei) Lee F-j | 18 | 9
6 | (Japan) A Koga (Japan) T Saito | 21 | 21

==== Section 2 ====
First Round
4 | (England) B Lane (England) S Vendy | 21 | 21
(England) P Briggs (England) G Mairs | 15 | 17
(Canada) J Hurlburt-Yu (Canada) D Yao | 21 | 16 | 21
Q2 | (France) E Adam (France) K Lovang | 19 | 21 | 12
7 | (France) T Gicquel (France) R Labar | 21 | 21
Q1 | (China) Huang D (China) Liang YW | 17 | 14
(Germany) J R Jansen (Germany) P Käsbauer | 18 | 21 | 21
(Chinese Taipei) Lee F-c (Chinese Taipei) Lu C-p | 21 | 19 | 23

Second Round
4 | (England) B Lane (England) S Vendy | 21 | 12 | 21
(Canada) J Hurlburt-Yu (Canada) D Yao | 11 | 21 | 13
7 | (France) T Gicquel (France) R Labar | 19 | 19
(Chinese Taipei) Lee F-c (Chinese Taipei) Lu C-p | 21 | 21

Quarter-finals
4 | (England) B Lane (England) S Vendy | 17 | 21 | 19
(Chinese Taipei) Lee F-c (Chinese Taipei) Lu C-p | 21 | 18 | 21

=== Bottom half ===
==== Section 3 ====
First Round
(Thailand) P Kuna-anuvit (Thailand) N Trinkajee | 14 | 21
Q4 | (Indonesia) P Kusumawardana (Indonesia) Y Rambitan | 21 | 23
(France) C Popov (France) T J Popov | 18 | 21 | 11
5 | (Chinese Taipei) Lee Y (Chinese Taipei) Wang C-l | 21 | 15 | 21
(India) T Kona (Malaysia) Lim K W | 21 | 21
(Algeria) M A Belarbi (Algeria) A Hamek | 16 | 15
(Republic of Ireland) J Magee (Republic of Ireland) P Reynolds | 19 | 21 | 18
PFQ | (Austria) P Birker (Austria) D Stipsits | 21 | 19 | 21

Second Round
Q4 | (Indonesia) P Kusumawardana (Indonesia) Y Rambitan | 16 | 20
5 | (Chinese Taipei) Lee Y (Chinese Taipei) Wang C-l | 21 | 22
(India) T Kona (Malaysia) Lim K W | 21 | 21
PFQ | (Austria) P Birker (Austria) D Stipsits | 10 | 16

Quarter-finals
5 | (Chinese Taipei) Lee Y (Chinese Taipei) Wang C-l | 21 | 14
(India) T Kona (Malaysia) Lim K W | 11 | 11^{r}

==== Section 4 ====
First Round
(Indonesia) M S Fikri (Indonesia) B Maulana | 21 | 21
(India) K P Garaga (India) D Kapila | 14 | 16
(Scotland) A Dunn (Scotland) A Hall | 21 | 25 | 21
8 | (Japan) H Okamura (Japan) M Onodera | 17 | 27 | 14
(Japan) M Kaneko (Japan) Y Kubota | 21 | 21
(Czech Republic) J Janáček (Czech Republic) T Švejda | 14 | 9
(Germany) B Geiss (Germany) J C Völker | 21 | 21
PFQ | (Bulgaria) D Nikolov (Bulgaria) I Rusev | 18 | 18

Second Round
(Indonesia) M S Fikri (Indonesia) B Maulana | 14 | 19
(Scotland) A Dunn (Scotland) A Hall | 21 | 21
(Japan) M Kaneko (Japan) Y Kubota | 23 | 21
(Germany) B Geiss (Germany) J C Völker | 21 | 16

Quarter-finals
(Scotland) A Dunn (Scotland) A Hall | 21 | 21
(Japan) M Kaneko (Japan) Y Kubota | 14 | 14

== Women's doubles ==
=== Seeds ===
1. (Japan) Nami Matsuyama / Chiharu Shida (withdrew)
2. (France) Émilie Lefel / Anne Tran (quarter-finals)
3. (France) Delphine Delrue / Léa Palermo (quarter-finals)
4. (Indonesia) Yulfira Barkah / Jauza Fadhila Sugiarto (quarter-finals)
5. (Japan) Akane Araki / Riko Imai (second round)
6. (England) Chloe Birch / Lauren Smith (champions)
7. (Germany) Johanna Goliszewski / Lara Käpplein (first round)
8. (Indonesia) Agatha Imanuela / Siti Fadia Silva Ramadhanti (semi-finals)

=== Finals ===
Semi-finals
(Chinese Taipei) Cheng Chi-ya (Chinese Taipei) Lee Chih-chen | 21 | 11 | 18
6 | (England) Chloe Birch (England) Lauren Smith | 5 | 21 | 21
(Chinese Taipei) Hsu Ya-ching (Chinese Taipei) Hu Ling-fang | 14 | 21 | 21
8 | (Indonesia) Agatha Imanuela (Indonesia) Siti Fadia Silva Ramadhanti | 21 | 18 | 10

Final
6 | (England) Chloe Birch (England) Lauren Smith | 21 | 21
(Chinese Taipei) Hsu Ya-ching (Chinese Taipei) Hu Ling-fang | 18 | 17

=== Top half ===
==== Section 1 ====
First Round
(Germany) A Jäger (Germany) S Küspert | 22 | 21
(India) K Garg (India) S Rane | 20 | 14
7 | (Germany) J Petrikowski (Germany) F Volkmann | 11 | 16
(Chinese Taipei) Cheng C-y (Chinese Taipei) Lee C-c | 21 | 21
(France) S Bauer (France) J Moinard | 21 | 21
(Germany) J Petrikowski (Germany) F Volkmann | 18 | 13

Second Round
1 | (Japan) N Matsuyama (Japan) C Shida
(Germany) A Jäger (Germany) S Küspert | w | / | o
(Chinese Taipei) Cheng C-y (Chinese Taipei) Lee C-c | 21 | 21
(France) S Bauer (France) J Moinard | 8 | 9

Quarter-finals
(Germany) A Jäger (Germany) S Küspert | 10 | 18
(Chinese Taipei) Cheng C-y (Chinese Taipei) Lee C-c | 21 | 21

==== Section 2 ====
First Round
(Germany) E Janssens (Germany) K Ostermeyer | 14 | 21
(India) P Dandu (India) S Santosh | 21 | 23
6 | (England) C Birch (England) L Smith | 21 | 21
(Poland) W Dąbczyńska (Poland) A Goszczyńska | 8 | 8
(Thailand) S Chaikittiwat (Thailand) S Paewsampran
(Italy) S Garino (Italy) L Iversen | w | / | o

Second Round
4 | (Indonesia) Y Barkah (Indonesia) J F Sugiarto | 21 | 18 | 21
(India) P Dandu (India) S Santosh | 14 | 21 | 19
6 | (England) C Birch (England) L Smith | 21 | 21
(Italy) S Garino (Italy) L Iversen | 10 | 6

Quarter-finals
4 | (Indonesia) Y Barkah (Indonesia) J F Sugiarto | 20 | 15
6 | (England) C Birch (England) L Smith | 22 | 21

=== Bottom half ===
==== Section 3 ====
First Round
(Chinese Taipei) Hsu Y-c (Chinese Taipei) Hu L-f | 21 | 21
(Chinese Taipei) Chang H-t (Chinese Taipei) Sung S-y | 17 | 14
(China) Yang XY (China) Zhang JE | 11 | 21 | 22
5 | (Japan) A Araki (Japan) R Imai | 21 | 18 | 24
(France) V Hériau (France) M Lambert | 13 | 10
(China) Chen FH (China) Hua XB | 21 | 21
(Croatia) K Galenić (Croatia) M Pavlinić | 12 | 8
3 | (France) D Delrue (France) L Palermo | 21 | 21

Second Round
(Chinese Taipei) Hsu Y-c (Chinese Taipei) Hu L-f | 21 | 18 | 21
5 | (Japan) A Araki (Japan) R Imai | 19 | 21 | 14
(China) Chen FH (China) Hua XB | 17 | 21 | 16
3 | (France) D Delrue (France) L Palermo | 21 | 14 | 21

Quarter-finals
(Chinese Taipei) Hsu Y-c (Chinese Taipei) Hu L-f | 8 | 21 | 21
3 | (France) D Delrue (France) L Palermo | 21 | 18 | 17

==== Section 4 ====
First Round
(Hungary) N Bukoviczki (Hungary) D Gonda | w | / | o
(Germany) L Efler (Germany) I Herttrich
(Estonia) K-K Marran (Estonia) H Rüütel | 9 | 11
8 | (Indonesia) A Imanuela (Indonesia) S F S Ramadhanti | 21 | 21
(Switzerland) N Fankhauser (Netherlands) I Tabeling | 21 | 21
(United States) E Kan (United States) I Zhong | 7 | 14

Second Round
(Hungary) N Bukoviczki (Hungary) D Gonda | 14 | 7
8 | (Indonesia) A Imanuela (Indonesia) S F S Ramadhanti | 21 | 21
(Switzerland) N Fankhauser (Netherlands) I Tabeling | 17 | 7
2 | (France) É Lefel (France) A Tran | 21 | 21

Quarter-finals
8 | (Indonesia) A Imanuela (Indonesia) S F S Ramadhanti | 21 | 21
2 | (France) É Lefel (France) A Tran | 15 | 17

== Mixed doubles ==
=== Seeds ===
1. (England) Marcus Ellis / Lauren Smith (second round)
2. (Germany) Mark Lamsfuß / Isabel Herttrich (withdrew)
3. (Germany) Marvin Emil Seidel / Linda Efler (withdrew)
4. (Russia) Evgenij Dremin / Evgenia Dimova (quarter-finals)
5. (England) Ben Lane / Jessica Pugh (second round)
6. (Republic of Ireland) Sam Magee / Chloe Magee (second round)
7. (Chinese Taipei) Wang Chi-lin / Cheng Chi-ya (second round)
8. (Netherlands) Jacco Arends / Cheryl Seinen (first round)

=== Finals ===
Semi-finals
(France) Ronan Labar (France) Anne Tran | 21 | 21
(Indonesia) Rehan Naufal Kusharjanto (Indonesia) Lisa Ayu Kusumawati | 10 | 12
(France) Thom Gicquel (France) Delphine Delrue | 25 | 21 | 21
(Chinese Taipei) Lee Yang (Chinese Taipei) Chang Hsin-tien | 27 | 19 | 19

Final
(France) Ronan Labar (France) Anne Tran | 11 | 14
(France) Thom Gicquel (France) Delphine Delrue | 21 | 21

=== Top half ===
==== Section 1 ====
First Round
1 | (England) M Ellis (England) L Smith | 23 | 19 | 21
(Indonesia) A Ramadiansyah (Indonesia) B F Romadhini | 21 | 21 | 11
(Germany) J R Jansen (Germany) K Ostermeyer | 21 | 7 | 15
(France) R Labar (France) A Tran | 16 | 21 | 21
8 | (Netherlands) J Arends (Netherlands) C Seinen | 17 | 17
(Bulgaria) A Vlaar (Bulgaria) M Mitsova | 21 | 21
Q2 | (France) W Villeger (France) S Bauer | 21 | 11 | 8
(England) T Wolfenden (England) J Moore | 16 | 21 | 21

Second Round
1 | (England) M Ellis (England) L Smith | 18 | 18
(France) R Labar (France) A Tran | 21 | 21
(Bulgaria) A Vlaar (Bulgaria) M Mitsova | 10 | 10
(England) T Wolfenden (England) J Moore | 21 | 21

Quarter-finals
(France) R Labar (France) A Tran | 17 | 21 | 21
(England) T Wolfenden (England) J Moore | 21 | 16 | 10

==== Section 2 ====
First Round
PFQ | (Italy) K Strobl (Italy) S Garino | 13 | 11
(Thailand) S Jomkoh (Thailand) S Paewsampran | 21 | 21
(Scotland) A Hall (Scotland) J MacPherson | 12 | 18
(Canada) J Hurlburt-Yu (Canada) J Wu | 21 | 21
6 | (Republic of Ireland) S Magee (Republic of Ireland) C Magee | 21 | 21
(Poland) P Śmiłowski (Poland) M Świerczyńska | 9 | 12
Q3 | (Chinese Taipei) Lu C-p (Chinese Taipei) Shung S-y | 15 | 21 | 22
(Indonesia) R N Kusharjanto (Indonesia) L A Kusumawati | 21 | 18 | 24

Second Round
(Thailand) S Jomkoh (Thailand) S Paewsampran | 9 | 21 | 19
(Canada) J Hurlburt-Yu (Canada) J Wu | 21 | 11 | 21
6 | (Republic of Ireland) S Magee (Republic of Ireland) C Magee | 21 | 21 | 16
(Indonesia) R N Kusharjanto (Indonesia) L A Kusumawati | 23 | 15 | 21

Quarter-finals
(Canada) J Hurlburt-Yu (Canada) J Wu | 21 | 17 | 19
(Indonesia) R N Kusharjanto (Indonesia) L A Kusumawati | 16 | 21 | 21

=== Bottom half ===
==== Section 3 ====
First Round
(United States) M Fogarty (United States) I Zhong | 9 | 11
(France) T Gicquel (France) D Delrue | 21 | 21
(France) G Mittelheisser (France) A Mittelheisser | 21 | 23
5 | (England) B Lane (England) J Pugh | 23 | 25
(Germany) J C Völker (Germany) E Janssens | 18 | 19
(India) D Kapila (India) K Garg | 21 | 21
(India) V G Prasad (India) J Dewangan | 15 | 19
4 | (Russia) E Dremin (Russia) E Dimova | 21 | 21

Second Round
(France) T Gicquel (France) D Delrue | 21 | 21
5 | (England) B Lane (England) J Pugh | 19 | 6
(India) D Kapila (India) K Garg | 21 | 12
4 | (Russia) E Dremin (Russia) E Dimova | 23 | 21

Quarter-finals
(France) T Gicquel (France) D Delrue | 21 | 21
4 | (Russia) E Dremin (Russia) E Dimova | 17 | 16

==== Section 4 ====
First Round
(Indonesia) R Samosir (Indonesia) H Julimarbela | 16 | 11
(Chinese Taipei) Lee Y (Chinese Taipei) Chang H-t | 21 | 21
(Chinese Taipei) Chang K-c (Chinese Taipei) Lee C-c | 15 | 17
7 | (Chinese Taipei) Wang C-l (Chinese Taipei) Cheng C-y | 21 | 21
Q1 | (China) Huang JW (China) Chen FH | 21 | 21
PFQ | (Slovakia) M Dratva (Slovakia) M Repiská | 7 | 11
Q4 | (Malaysia) Lim K W (Malaysia) Lee Z Q | 18 | 21 | 21
PFQ | (Germany) P Scheiel (Germany) F Volkmann | 21 | 16 | 15

Second Round
(Chinese Taipei) Lee Y (Chinese Taipei) Chang H-t | 14 | 24 | 21
7 | (Chinese Taipei) Wang C-l (Chinese Taipei) Cheng C-y | 21 | 22 | 13
Q1 | (China) Huang JW (China) Chen FH | 21 | 21
Q4 | (Malaysia) Lim K W (Malaysia) Lee Z Q | 19 | 13

Quarter-finals
(Chinese Taipei) Lee Y (Chinese Taipei) Chang H-t | 21 | 19 | 21
Q1 | (China) Huang JW (China) Chen FH | 15 | 21 | 11

| Preceded by 2019 Swiss Open | BWF World Tour; 2019 BWF season | Succeeded by 2019 India Open |
