= Azerbaijani National Badminton Championships =

The Azerbaijani National Badminton Championships is a tournament organized to crown the best badminton players in Azerbaijan. They are held since the season 1996/1997.

== Past winners ==
Year	Men's singles	Women's singles	Men's doubles	Women's doubles	Mixed doubles
1997	Mirzə Orucov	Nərgiz Mehdiyeva	Mirzə Orucov; Ceyhun Məmmədəliyev	Alla Vlasyuk; Sevinc Akhundova	Ceyhun Məmmədəliyev; Nərgiz Mehdiyeva
1998	Mirzə Orucov	Nərgiz Mehdiyeva	Mirzə Orucov; Ceyhun Məmmədəliyev	Alla Vlasyuk; Sevinc Akhundova	Ceyhun Məmmədəliyev; Alla Vlasyuk
1999	Mirzə Orucov	Nərgiz Mehdiyeva	Mirzə Orucov; Ceyhun Məmmədəliyev	Alla Vlasyuk; Sevinc Akhundova	Ceyhun Məmmədəliyev; Alla Vlasyuk
2000	Ceyhun Məmmədəliyev	Nərgiz Mehdiyeva	Cavanşir Alizadə; Sarvan Nagiev	Alla Vlasyuk; Sevinc Akhundova	Ceyhun Məmmədəliyev; Alla Vlasyuk
2001	Mirzə Orucov	Nərgiz Mehdiyeva	Mirzə Orucov; Ceyhun Məmmədəliyev	Nərgiz Mehdiyeva; Natavan Əliyeva	Mirzə Orucov; Sevinc Akhundova
2002	Mirzə Orucov	Nərgiz Mehdiyeva	Mirzə Orucov; Ceyhun Məmmədəliyev	Alla Vlasyuk; Sevinc Akhundova	Mirzə Orucov; Sevinc Akhundova
2003	Ceyhun Məmmədəliyev	Nərgiz Mehdiyeva	Mirzə Orucov; Ceyhun Məmmədəliyev	Nərgiz Mehdiyeva; Natavan Əliyeva	Ceyhun Məmmədəliyev; Nərgiz Mehdiyeva
2004	Araz Soltanaliyev	Nərgiz Mehdiyeva	Araz Soltanaliyev; Sarvan Nagiev	Sevinc Akhundova; Alla Vlasyuk	Mirzə Orucov; Sevinc Akhundova
2005	Javanshir Alizade	Nərgiz Mehdiyeva	Javanshir Alizade; Araz Soltanaliyev	Nərgiz Mehdiyeva; Alla Vlasyuk	Ceyhun Məmmədəliyev; Nərgiz Mehdiyeva
2006	Araz Soltanaliyev	Nərgiz Mehdiyeva	Mirza Orujov; Jeyhun Mamedaliyev	Nərgiz Mehdiyeva; Alla Vlasyuk	Ceyhun Məmmədəliyev; Nərgiz Mehdiyeva
2007	Kanan Rzayev	Nərgiz Mehdiyeva	Ceyhun Məmmədəliyev; Mirza Orujov	Nərgiz Mehdiyeva; Alla Vlasyuk	Ceyhun Məmmədəliyev; Nərgiz Mehdiyeva
2008	Orkhan Galandarov	Nərgiz Mehdiyeva	Karim Musayev; Tural Rasulov	Nərgiz Mehdiyeva; Alla Vlasyuk	Ceyhun Məmmədəliyev; Nərgiz Mehdiyeva
2009	Kanan Rzayev	Gunay Huseynova	Karim Musayev; Tural Rasulov	Gunay Huseynova; Alizade Pervin	Tural Rasulov; Terane Kerimova
2010	Kənan Rzayev	Nərgiz Mehdiyeva	Kənan Rzayev; Javanshir Alizada	Nərgiz Mehdiyeva; Alla Vlasyuk	Orkhan Galandarov; Nərgiz Mehdiyeva
2011	Orkhan Galandarov	Nərgiz Mehdiyeva	Karim Musayev; Kənan Rzayev	Nərgiz Mehdiyeva; Alla Vlasyuk	Orkhan Galandarov; Nərgiz Mehdiyeva
2012	Kənan Rzayev	Alla Vlasyuk	Karim Musayev; Kənan Rzayev	Zülfiyyə Hüseynova; Alla Vlasyuk	Orkhan Galandarov; Alla Vlasyuk
2013	Karim Musayev	Nərgiz Mehdiyeva	Karim Musayev; Kənan Rzayev	Nərgiz Mehdiyeva; Alla Vlasyuk	Orkhan Galandarov; Nərgiz Mehdiyeva
2014	Kənan Rzayev	Nərgiz Mehdiyeva	Jahid Alhasanov; Tural Abbasov	Zülfiyyə Hüseynova; Alla Vlasyuk	Orkhan Galandarov; Nərgiz Mehdiyeva
2015	Orkhan Galandarov	Nərgiz Mehdiyeva	Orkhan Galandarov; Kənan Rzayev	Zülfiyyə Hüseynova; Nərgiz Mehdiyeva	Orkhan Galandarov; Nərgiz Mehdiyeva
2016	Orkhan Galandarov	Zülfiyyə Hüseynova	Orkhan Galandarov; Kənan Rzayev	Adila Mehdiyeva; Zülfiyyə Hüseynova	Kənan Rzayev; Alla Vlasyuk
2017	Ade Resky Dwicahyo	Nərgiz Mehdiyeva	Ade Resky Dwicahyo; Ezmi Qovimuramadhoni	Ədilə Mehdiyeva; Zülfiyyə Hüseynova	Orkhan Galandarov; Nərgiz Mehdiyev
2018	Ade Resky Dwicahyo	Nərgiz Mehdiyeva	Ade Resky Dwicahyo; Azmy Qowimuramadhoni	Adila Mehdiyeva; Zülfiyyə Hüseynova	Teymur Abbasov; Zülfiyyə Hüseynova
2019	Ade Resky Dwicahyo	Nigar Əliyeva	Cahid Əlhəsənov; Ezmi Qovimuramadhoni	Nigar Əliyeva; Nərmin Şərifova	Sabuhi Huseynov; Zülfiyyə Hüseynova
2020; 2021	No competition				
2022	Cahid Əlhəsənov	Həcər Nuriyeva	Rəvan Niftalıyev; Aqil Qəbilov	Əminə İsmayılova; Həcər Nuriyeva	Aqil Qəbilov; Nigar Səmədova
2023	Cahid Əlhəsənov	Həcər Nuriyeva	Aqil Qəbilov; Rəvan Niftəliyev	Həcər Nuriyeva; Nərmin Hüseynova	Cahid Əlhəsənov; Həcər Nuriyeva
2024	Aqil Qəbilov	Nigar Səmədova	Aqil Qəbilov; Rəvan Niftalıyev	Aysu Kərimzadə; Nigar Səmədova	Cahid Əlhəsənov; Həcər Nuriyeva

=== Junior champions ===
Year	Men's singles	Women's singles	Men's doubles	Women's doubles	Mixed doubles
1997	Ganbar Ragimov	Tarana Kerimova	Mehdiev Rovsban; Elshan Abbasov	Tarana Kerimova; Elnara Mchdieva	Rovshan Mchdiev; Tarana Kerimova
1998	Ganbar Ragimov	Tarana Kerimova	Zaur Osmanov; Gangar Ragimov	Tarana Kerimova; Sabina Mamedova	Zaur Osmanov; Tarana Kerimova
1999	Zaur Osmanov	Tarana Kerimova	Zaur Osmanov; Gangar Ragimov	Tarana Kerimova; Zahira Yakubova	Zaur Osmanov; Tarana Kerimova
2000	Ganbar Ragimov	Tarana Kerimova	Zaur Osmanov; Gangar Ragimov	Tarana Kerimova; Elnara Nasrullayeva	Zaur Osmanov; Tarana Kerimova
2001	Yuriy Bizev	Elnara Nasrullayeva	Yuriy Bizev; Toural Rasulov	Elnara Nasrullayeva; Natavan Eyvazova	Yuriy Bizev; Elnara Nasrullayeva
2002	Yuriy Bizev	Narmina Tagiyeva	Yuriy Bizev; Toural Rasulov	Rena Feyzullayeva; Nurane Akperova	Toural Rasulov; Nurane Akperova
2003	Toural Rasulov	Narmina Tagiyeva	Samed Qaibov; Rauf Habibov	Narmina Tagiyeva; Dinara Nasirova	Toural Rasulov; Nurane Akperova
2004	Toural Rasulov	Gunay Huseynova	Rauf Habibov; Malik Agayev	Gunay Huseynova; Inna Ananyeva	Toural Rasulov; Nurane Akperova
2005	Kerim Musayev	Nermin Tagiyeva	Samed Qaibov; Vuqar Abdullayev	Narmin Tagiyeva; Gunay Huseynova	Samed Qaibov; Narmin Tagiyeva
2006	Kanan Rzayev	Nermin Tagiyeva	Kanan Rzayev; Elshan Mehdiyev	Gunay Huseynova; Narmin Tagiyeva	Kanan Rzayev; Nurane Ekberova
2007	Kanan Rzayev	Parvin Alizade	Vuqar Abdullayev; Orkhan Galandarov	Alizade Pervin; Misautova Lora	Orkhan Galandarov; Nesirova Dinare
2008	Orkhan Galandarov	Gunay Huseynova	Orkhan Galandarov; Rahim Salimov	Alizade Pervin; Gunay Huseynova	Vaqif Azizova; Gunay Huseynova
2009	Rahim Salimov	Narmin Azizova	Vuqar Abdullayev; Rahim Salimov	Gulnar Ebilova; Narmin Azizova	Orkhan Garagozov; Narmin Azizova
2010	Teymur Abbasov	Gulnara Abilova	Orkhan Garagozov; Teymur Abbasov	Oksana Javadova; Irina Nazarenko	Orkhan Kuzatov; Irina Nazarenko
2011	Vugar Alizada	Zülfiyyə Hüseynova	Jahid Alhasanov; Teymur Abbasov	Zülfiyyə Hüseynova; Aliya Huseynova	Teymur Abbasov; Irina Nazarenko
2012	Vugar Alizada	Zülfiyyə Hüseynova	Jahid Alhasanov; Teymur Abbasov	Zülfiyyə Hüseynova; Aliya Huseynova	Vugar Alizada; Zülfiyyə Hüseynova
2013	Jahid Alhasanov	Zülfiyyə Hüseynova	Vagif Alizada; Bahruz Gadirli	Zülfiyyə Hüseynova; Aliya Huseynova	Jahid Alhasanov; Zülfiyyə Hüseynova
2014	Jahid Alhasanov	Adila Mehdiyeva	Jahid Alhasanov; Sabuhi Huseynov	Aliya Huseynova; Fidan Huseynli	Jahid Alhasanov; Zulfiyya Huseynova
2015	Sabuhi Huseynov	Adila Mehdiyeva	Farid Suleymanov; Murad Bayramov	Aliya Huseynova; Fidan Huseynli	Sabuhi Huseynov; Adila Mehdiyeva
2016	Sabuhi Huseynov	Adila Mehdiyeva	Sabuhi Huseynov; Murad Bayramov	Adila Mehdiyeva; Nigar Aliyeva	Sabuhi Huseynov; Adila Mehdiyeva
201	Sabuhi Huseynov	Adila Mehdiyeva	Vaqif Ismayilov; Said Mirjafarov	Elnura Jafarova; Avesta Nazenin	Sabuhi Huseynov; Elnura Jafarova
2018	Zaur Isazade	Nigar Əliyeva	Ravan Niftaliyev; Aqil Qabilov	Nərmin Şərifova; Nigar Əliyeva	Ravan Niftaliyev; Nigar Əliyeva
2019	Ravan Niftaliyev	Nigar Əliyeva	Ravan Niftaliyev; Aqil Qabilov	Yegana Akbarova; Həcər Nuriyeva	Ravan Niftaliyev; Nigar Əliyeva
2020; 2022	No Competition				
2023	Agil Gabilov	Həcər Nuriyeva	Ravan Niftaliyev; Aqil Qabilov	Amina Ismayilova; Həcər Nuriyeva	Agil Gabilov; Nigar Samadova
2024	Sərxan Bağırov	Həcər Nuriyeva	Sərxan Bağırov; Əli Gözəlov	Nərmin Hüseynova; Həcər Nuriyeva	Sərxan Bağırov; Həcər Nuriyeva
