= Thomas Baures =

French badminton player (born 1998)

Personal information
- Born: Thomas Jackie Baures; 12 January 1998 (age 28) Nancy, France

Sport
- Country: France
- Sport: Badminton

Men's singles & doubles
- Highest ranking: 757 (MS 10 September 2015); 171 (MD with Samy Corvée 30 April 2019); 731 (XD with Joanna Chaube 12 May 2016)
- BWF profile
Medal record
Men's badminton
Representing France
European Junior Championships
Gold medal – first place	2017 Mulhouse	Mixed team

Thomas Jackie Baures (born 12 January 1998) is a French badminton player. Baures was part of the France team who won the mixed team competition at the 2017 European Junior Badminton Championships.

== Achievements ==
=== BWF International Challenge/Series (2 runners-up) ===
Men's doubles
Year	Tournament	Partner	Opponent	Score	Result
2015	Riga International	(France) Thom Gicquel	(Denmark) Mads Emil Christensen (Denmark) Kristoffer Knudsen	12–21, 13–21	(silver) Runner-up
2018	Belarus International	(France) Léo Rossi	(Azerbaijan) Ade Resky Dwicahyo (Azerbaijan) Azmy Qowimuramadhoni	18–21, 14–21	(silver) Runner-up

=== BWF Junior Tournament (1 title, 2 runners-up) ===
Boys' doubles
Year	Tournament	Partner	Opponent	Score	Result
2016	Hellas Junior	(France) Toma Junior Popov	(France) Éloi Adam (France) Samy Corvée	21–18, 21–15	(gold) Winner

Mixed doubles
Year	Tournament	Partner	Opponent	Score	Result
2015	Swiss Junior	(France) Vimala Hériau	(Denmark) Ditlev Jæger Holm (Denmark) Ditte Søby Hansen	11–21, 16–21	(silver) Runner-up
2016	Hellas Junior	(France) Marine Hadjal	(France) Éloi Adam (France) Lole Courtois	20–22, 17–21	(silver) Runner-up

BWF International Challenge tournament
BWF International Series tournament
BWF Future Series tournament
