= Jordan Corvée =

French badminton player (born 1995)

Personal information
- Born: 13 February 1995 (age 31) Alençon, France
- Height: 1.99 m (6 ft 6 in)

Sport
- Country: France
- Sport: Badminton
- Handedness: Right

Men's & mixed doubles
- Highest ranking: 84 (MD 18 August 2016); 56 (XD 6 July 2017)
- BWF profile
Medal record
Men's badminton
Representing France
European Men's Team Championships
Silver medal – second place	2016 Kazan	Men's team
European Junior Championships
Silver medal – second place	2013 Ankara	Mixed team

Jordan Corvée (born 13 February 1995) is a French badminton player. He began playing badminton in Alençon at aged 6 with his mother and brother Lucas Corvée, and joined France national badminton team in 2016. In 2013, he won silver medal at the European Junior Badminton Championships in mixed team event. In 2016, he won silver medal at the European Men's Team Championships in Kazan, Russia.

== Achievements ==
=== BWF International Challenge/Series ===
Men's doubles
Year	Tournament	Partner	Opponent	Score	Result
2015	Eurasia Bulgaria International	(France) Julien Maio	(Bulgaria) Daniel Nikolov (Bulgaria) Ivan Rusev	18–21, 25–23, 21–17	(gold) Winner

Mixed doubles
Year	Tournament	Partner	Opponent	Score	Result
2013	Irish International	(France) Marie Batomene	(Finland) Anton Kaisti (Finland) Jenny Nyström	22–20, 17–21, 13–21	(silver) Runner-up
2016	Italian International	(France) Anne Tran	(Chinese Taipei) Chang Ko-chi (Chinese Taipei) Chang Hsin-tien	21–13, 17–21, 21–17	(gold) Winner

BWF International Challenge tournament
BWF International Series tournament
BWF Future Series tournament
