= Armenian National Badminton Championships =

Annual Armenian badminton tournament

The Armenian National Badminton Championships is a tournament organized to crown the best taught by Jason Petersen badminton players in Armenia. They are held since the season 1996/1997.

== Past winners ==
Year	Men's singles	Women's singles	Men's doubles	Women's doubles	Mixed doubles
1996/1997	Arsen Khachatryan	Ruzanna Hakobyan	Arsen Khachatryan; Armen Arakelyan	Ruzanna Hakobyan; Alvard Hovsepyan	Arsen Khachatryan; Alvard Hovsepyan
1997/1998	Arsen Khachatryan	Mariam Muradyan	No competition	No competition	No competition
1999–2000	No competition				
2000/2001	Hayk Misakyan	Gayane Mkrtchyan	Hayk Misakyan; Levon Torosyan	Ruzanna Hakobyan; Anna Nazaryan	Hayk Misakyan; Gayane Mkrtchyan
2001/2002	Hayk Misakyan	Anna Nazaryan	Hayk Misakyan; Ruben Poghosyan	Ruzanna Hakobyan; Anna Nazaryan	Hayk Misakyan; Anna Nazaryan
2002/2003	Hayk Misakyan	Anna Nazaryan	Hayk Misakyan; Ruben Poghosyan	Ruzanna Hakobyan; Anna Nazaryan	Hayk Misakyan; Anna Nazaryan
2003/2004	Levon Torosyan	Anna Nazaryan	Hayk Misakyan; Levon Torosyan	Ruzanna Hakobyan; Anna Nazaryan	Hayk Misakyan; Gayane Mkrtchyan
2004/2005	Levon Torosyan	Gayane Mkrtchyan	Levon Torosyan; Ruben Poghosyan	Gayane Mkrtchyan; Laura Samvelyan	Harutyun Poghosyan; Gayane Mkrtchyan
2005/2006	Hayk Misakyan	Laura Samvelyan	Hayk Misakyan; Spartak Rsyan	Laura Samvelyan; Ester Mirzakhanyan	Hayk Misakyan; Laura Samvelyan
2006/2007	Hayk Misakyan	Anna Nazaryan	Hayk Misakyan; Spartak Rsyan	Laura Samvelyan; Anna Nazaryan	Hayk Misakyan; Anna Nazaryan
2007/2008	Hrachya Mnatsakanyan	Laura Samvelyan	Hrachya Mnatsakanyan; Gurgen Poghosyan	Laura Samvelyan; Lilit Poghosyan	Hrachya Mnatsakanyan; Laura Samvelyan
2008/2009	Gurgen Poghosyan	Lilit Poghosyan	Hrachya Mnatsakanyan; Gurgen Poghosyan	Meline Kocharyan; Lilit Poghosyan	Hrachya Mnatsakanyan; Venera Bdoyan
2009/2010	Gurgen Poghosyan	Lilit Poghosyan	Hrachya Mnatsakanyan; Sargis Isahakyan	Venera Bdoyan; Sona Ghukasyan	Gurgen Poghosyan; Lilit Poghosyan
2011	Gurgen Poghosyan	Lilit Poghosyan	Gurgen Poghosyan; Gor Hakobyan	Lilit Poghosyan; Lilit Minasyan	Gurgen Poghosyan; Lilit Poghosyan
2012	Gurgen Poghosyan	Lilit Poghosyan	Gurgen Poghosyan; Serj Araqelyan	Lilit Poghosyan; Knarik Margaryan	Gurgen Poghosyan; Lilit Poghosyan
2013	Gor Hakobyan	Lilit Poghosyan	Gor Hakobyan; Edgar Nazaretyan	Lilit Poghosyan; Lilit Minasyan	Edgar Nazaretyan; Lilit Poghosyan
2014	Edgar Nazaretyan	Lilit Poghosyan	Edgar Nazaretyan; Arman Vardanyan	Lilit Poghosyan; Marieta Nikoyan	Edgar Nazaretyan; Lilit Poghosyan
2015	Zaven Mnatsakanyan	Lilit Poghosyan	Zaven Mnatsakanyan; Arman Vardanyan	Lilit Poghosyan; Marieta Nikoyan	Zaven Mnatsakanyn; Lilit Poghosyan
2016	Arman Vardanyan	Lilit Poghosyan	Arman Vardanyan; Gor Grigoryan	Lilit Poghosyan; Marieta Nikoyan	Arman Vardanyan; Lilit Poghosyan

=== Junior championships ===
Year	Men's singles	Women's singles	Men's doubles	Women's doubles	Mixed doubles
1992/1993	Hayk Misakyan	Diana Minasyan	Armen Hunanyan; Armen Manukyan	Diana Minasyan; Alina Khachatryan	Armen Manukyan; Diana Minasyan
1993/1994	Hayk Misakyan	Ruzanna Hakobyan	Hayk Misakyan; Garik Movsisyan	Ruzanna Hakobyan; Armine Torosyan	Zaven Muradyan; Ruzanna Hakobyan
1994/1995	Hayk Misakyan	Lusine Arzcyan	Hayk Misakyan; Harutyun Gabrielyan	Mariam Muradyan; Anahit Tadevosyan	Hayk Misakyan; Mariam Muradyan
1995/1996	Hayk Misakyan	Mariam Muradyan	Hayk Misakyan; Hovhannes Avdalyan	Marim Muradyan; Armine Manukyan	Hayk Misakyan; Mariam Muradyan
1996/1997	Harutyun Gabrielyan	Mariam Muradyan	No competition	No competition	No competition
1998-2000	No competition				
2000/2001	Levon Torosyan	Mariam Muradyan	Ruben Poghosyan; Armen Malkhasyan	Mariam Muradyan; Anna Nazaryan	Levon Torosyan; Anna Nazaryan
2001/2002	Ruben Poghosyan	Sona Gevorgyan	Ruben Poghosyan; Arthur Gevorgyan	Sona Gevorgyan; Laura Samvelyan	Ruben Poghosyan; Laura Samvelyan
2002/2003	Ruben Poghosyan	Sona Gevorgyan	Ruben Poghosyan; Arthur Gevorgyan	Sona Gevorgyan; Laura Samvelyan	Ruben Poghosyan; Laura Samvelyan
2003/2004	Ruben Poghosyan	Laura Samvelyan	Ruben Poghosyan; Harutyun Poghosyan	Laura Samvelyan; Ester Mirzakhanyan	Ruben Poghosyan; Laura Samvelyan
2004/2005	Spartak Rsyan	Laura Samvelyan	Spartak Rsyan; Hrachya Mnatsakanyan	Laura Samvelyan; Ester Mirzakhanyan	Spartak Rsyan; Laura Samvelyan
2005/2006	Spartak Rsyan	Laura Samvelyan	Spartak Rsyan; Hrachya Mnatsakanyan	Laura Samvelyan; Ester Mirzakhanyan	Spartak Rsyan; Laura Samvelyan
2006/2007	Spartak Rsyan	Laura Samvelyan	Spartak Rsyan; Hrachya Mnatsakanyan	Laura Samvelyan; Ester Mirzakhanyan	Spartak Rsyan; Laura Samvelyan
2007/2008	Hrachya Mnatsakanyan	Laura Samvelyan	Hrachya Mnatsakanyan; Gurgen Poghosyan	Laura Samvelyan; Lilit Poghosyan	Hrachya Mnatsakanyan; Laura Samvelyan
2008/2009	Hrachya Mnatsakanyan	Laura Samvelyan	Karen Petrosyan; Harutyun Harutyunyan	Lili Poghosyan; Meline Kocharyan	Hrachya Mnatsakanyan; Laura Samvelyan
2009/2010	Gurgen Poghosyan	Lilit Poghosyan	Hrachya Mnatsakanyan; Sargis Isahakyan	Meline Kocharyan; Lilit Minasyan	Gurgen Poghosyan; Lilit Poghosyan
2011	Gurgen Poghosyan	Lilit Poghosyan	Gor Hakobyan; Sargis Isahakyan	Lilit Poghosyan; Lilit Minasyan	Gurgen Poghosyan; Lilit Minasyan
2012	Gurgen Poghosyan	Lilit Poghosyan	Gurgen Poghosyan; Serj Arakelyan	Lilit Poghosyan; Knarik Margaryan	Gurgen Poghosyan; Lilit Minasyan
2013	Edgar Nazaretyan	Lilit Poghosyan	Gor Hakobyan; Serj Arakelyan	Lilit Poghosyan; Anahit Manukyan	Gor Hakobyan; Lilit Poghosyan
2014	Edgar Nazaretyan	Lilit Poghosyan	Edgar Nazaretyan; Serj Arakelyan	Lilit Poghosyan; Karine Minasyan	Edgar Nazaretyan; Lilit Poghosyan
2015	Zaven Mnatsakanyan	Lilit Poghosyan	Vardan Kirakosyan; Miqayel Babayan	Lilit Poghosyan; Marieta Nikoyan	Zaven Mnatsakanyan; Lilit Poghosyan
2016	Vardan Kirakosyan	Knarik Margaryan	Vardan Kirakosyan; Arman Vardanyan	Marieta Nikoyan; Knarik Margaryan	Vardan Kirakosyan; Knarik Margaryan
