= Thomas Rouxel =

French badminton player (born 1991)

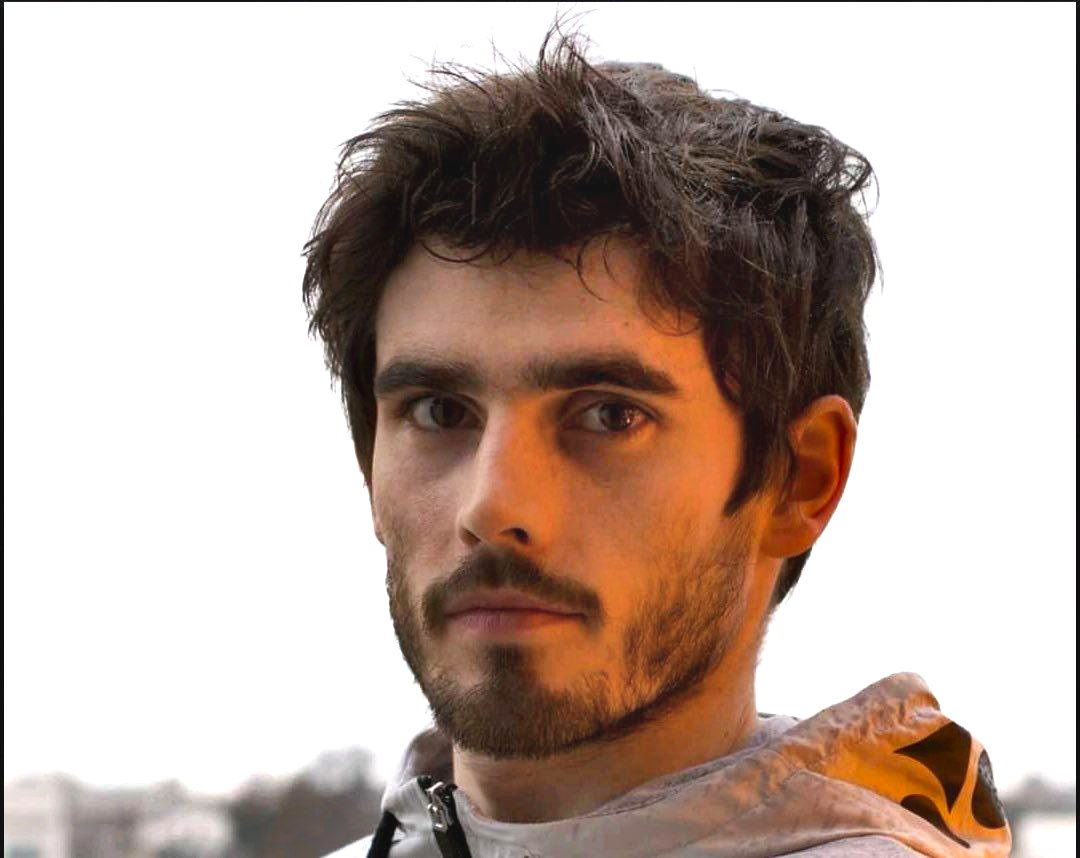

Personal information
- Born: 26 May 1991 (age 35) Rennes, France
- Years active: 2010–2022
- Height: 1.72 m (5 ft 8 in)

Sport
- Country: France
- Sport: Badminton
- Handedness: Right
- Retired: 2 September 2022

Men's singles
- Highest ranking: 38 (2 November 2021)
- Current ranking: 93 (3 January 2023)
- BWF profile
Medal record
Men's badminton
Representing France
European Men's Team Championships
Silver medal – second place	2016 Kazan	Men's team
Bronze medal – third place	2018 Kazan	Men's team

Thomas Rouxel (born 26 May 1991) is a French badminton player affiliated with Chambly Oise club. In 2016, he won the silver medal at the European Men's Team Championships in Kazan, Russia.

== Career ==
Rouxel helped the team to win silver in the European Men's Team Championships. He also help the team to achieve bronze two years later in the men's team event. Thomas reached the finals of the 2019 Orléans Masters Super 100. He lost in the final to Koki Watanabe in 3 games.

Rouxel announced his retirement from badminton on 2 September 2022 on his Instagram account.

== Achievements ==
=== BWF World Tour (1 runners-up) ===
The BWF World Tour, which was announced on 19 March 2017 and implemented in 2018, is a series of elite badminton tournaments sanctioned by the Badminton World Federation (BWF). The BWF World Tour is divided into levels of World Tour Finals, Super 1000, Super 750, Super 500, Super 300 (part of the HSBC World Tour), and the BWF Tour Super 100.

Men's singles
Year	Tournament	Level	Opponent	Score	Result
2019	Orléans Masters	Super 100	(Japan) Koki Watanabe	21–18, 12–21, 19–21	(silver) Runner-up

=== BWF International Challenge/Series ===
Men's singles
Year	Tournament	Opponent	Score	Result
2014	White Nights	(Germany) Dieter Domke	16–21, 23–25	(silver) Runner-up
2015	Peru International	(France) Lucas Corvée	21–12, 21–13	(gold) Winner
2016	Polish Open	(Finland) Eetu Heino	21–11, 21–16	(gold) Winner
2017	White Nights	(Spain) Pablo Abián	21–15, 15–21, 18–21	(silver) Runner-up
2017	Czech Open	(Japan) Kento Momota	8–21, 14–21	(silver) Runner-up
2018	Italian International	(Denmark) Victor Svendsen	12–21, 17–21	(silver) Runner-up

BWF International Challenge tournament
BWF International Series tournament
BWF Future Series tournament
