= Myanmar International (badminton) =

Badminton tournament

The Myanmar International is an international badminton tournament held in Yangon, Myanmar. This tournament was established in 1999 as Asian Satellite event but did not held again until 2019, and now part of the Badminton Asia Circuit.

== Past winners ==
=== Myanmar International Challenge ===
| Year | Men's singles | Women's singles | Men's doubles | Women's doubles | Mixed doubles |
|---|---|---|---|---|---|
| 2020 | Cancelled (Note: This tournament, originally to be played from 29 September to 4 October, was later postponed due to COVID-19 pandemic in Myanmar.) | | | | |

=== Myanmar International Series ===
| Year | Men's singles | Women's singles | Men's doubles | Women's doubles | Mixed doubles |
|---|---|---|---|---|---|
| 1999 | (Thailand) Boonsak Ponsana | (Singapore) Li Li | (Thailand) Patapol Ngernsrisuk (Thailand) Sudket Prapakamol | (Singapore) Fatimah Kumin Lim (Singapore) Li Li | (Singapore) Aman Santosa (Singapore) Li Li |
| 2000– 2018 | No competition | | | | |
| 2019 | (India) Kaushal Dharmamer | (Indonesia) Sri Fatmawati | (Indonesia) Emanuel Randhy Febryto (Indonesia) Ferdian Mahardika Ranialdy | (Chinese Taipei) Liu Chiao-yun (Chinese Taipei) Wang Yu-qiao | (Chinese Taipei) Lin Yong-sheng (Chinese Taipei) Liu Chiao-yun |
| 2020– 2023 | No competition | | | | |
| 2024 | Cancelled (Note: This tournament, originally to be played from 3 to 8 September, was later cancelled.) | | | | |

=== Myanmar Future Series ===
| Year | Men's singles | Women's singles | Men's doubles | Women's doubles | Mixed doubles |
|---|---|---|---|---|---|
| 2020 | Cancelled (Note: This tournament, originally to be played from 6 to 11 October, was later postponed due to COVID-19 pandemic in Myanmar.) | | | | |
| 2021– 2023 | No competition | | | | |
| 2024 | Cancelled (Note: This tournament, originally to be played from 27 August to 1 September, was later cancelled.) | | | | |

== Performances by countries ==
=== Myanmar International Series ===
Top countries
| Pos | Country | MS | WS | MD | WD | XD | Total |
|---|---|---|---|---|---|---|---|
| 1 | Singapore | 0 | 1 | 0 | 1 | 1 | 3 |
| 2 | Chinese Taipei | 0 | 0 | 0 | 1 | 1 | 2 |
| 2 | Indonesia | 0 | 1 | 1 | 0 | 0 | 2 |
| 2 | Thailand | 1 | 0 | 1 | 0 | 0 | 2 |
| 5 | India | 1 | 0 | 0 | 0 | 0 | 1 |
| Total | | 2 | 2 | 2 | 2 | 2 | 10 |
