= Jan Louda =

Czech badminton player (born 1999)

Personal information
- Born: 25 April 1999 (age 27) Plzeň, Czech Republic
- Height: 1.86 m (6 ft 1 in)

Sport
- Country: Czech Republic
- Sport: Badminton
- Handedness: Left

Men's singles
- Career record: 246 wins, 121 losses
- Highest ranking: 39 (1 August 2023)
- Current ranking: 63 (23 July 2024)
- BWF profile

Jan Louda (born 25 April 1999) is a Czech badminton player.

== Career ==
Louda started playing badminton at a small age of 5, when his father introduced him to the sport of badminton. In his career so far, he has won international titles in Czech Republic, Mexico, Slovakia and Ukraine. He represented Czech Republic at the 2024 Summer Olympics in the men's singles discipline.

== Achievements ==
=== BWF International Challenge/Series (5 titles, 6 runners-up) ===
Men's singles
Year	Tournament	Opponent	Score	Result
2018	Kharkiv International	(Azerbaijan) Ade Resky Dwicahyo	21–14, 21–18	(gold) Winner
2019	Slovenia International	(Denmark) Karan Rajan Rajarajan	17–21, 21–11, 19–21	(silver) Runner-up
2020	Slovak Open	(England) Johnnie Torjussen	21–18, 12–21, 21–15	(gold) Winner
2021	Spanish International	(Spain) Pablo Abián	20–22, 22–20, 14–21	(silver) Runner-up
2021	Hellas International	(Malaysia) Lee Shun Yang	14–21, 22–24	(silver) Runner-up
2021	Czech Open	(Malaysia) Ng Tze Yong	16–21, 21–16, 27–25	(gold) Winner
2021	Italian International	(France) Alex Lanier	12–21, 21–18, 11–21	(silver) Runner-up
2022	Polish International	(Japan) Yushi Tanaka	13–21, 15–21	(silver) Runner-up
2022	Welsh International	(Denmark) Mads Christophersen	13–21, 18–21	(silver) Runner-up
2023	Mexican International	(Ukraine) Danylo Bosniuk	21–10, 22–24, 21–15	(gold) Winner
2023	Czech Open	(Indonesia) Andi Fadel Muhammad	21–17, 21–13	(gold) Winner

BWF International Challenge tournament
BWF International Series tournament
BWF Future Series tournament

=== BWF Junior International (5 titles, 2 runners-up) ===
Boys' singles
Year	Tournament	Opponent	Score	Result
2015	Czech Junior International	(Denmark) Mathias Jørgensen	21–14, 21–18	(gold) Winner
2016	Czech Junior International	(Bulgaria) Daniel Nikolov	10–21, 15–21	(silver) Runner-up
2016	Slovak Junior International	(Indonesia) Azmy Qowimuramadhoni	21–17, 21–15	(gold) Winner
2017	Polish Junior International	(Ukraine) Danylo Bosniuk	21–13, 18–21, 22–20	(gold) Winner

Boys' doubles
Year	Tournament	Partner	Opponent	Score	Result
2015	Slovak Junior International	(Czech Republic) Michal Hubáček	(Poland) Aleksander Jabłoński (Poland) Paweł Śmiłowski	19–21, 21–12, 21–10	(gold) Winner
2015	Czech Junior International	(Czech Republic) Petr Beran	(Poland) Aleksander Jabłoński (Poland) Paweł Śmiłowski	25–27, 17–21	(silver) Runner-up
2016	Polish Junior International	(Czech Republic) Petr Beran	(France) Thom Gicquel (France) Léo Rossi	28–26, 21–16	(gold) Winner

BWF Junior International Grand Prix tournament
BWF Junior International Challenge tournament
BWF Junior International Series tournament
BWF Junior Future Series tournament
