= Johnnie Torjussen =

English badminton player (born 1999)

Personal information
- Born: 24 June 1999 (age 27)

Sport
- Country: England
- Sport: Badminton
- Handedness: Right

Men's singles
- Highest ranking: 131 (18 July 2023)
- BWF profile
Medal record
Men's badminton
Representing England
European Mixed Team Championships
Bronze medal – third place	2023 Aire-sur-la-Lys	Mixed team
European Junior Championships
Bronze medal – third place	2017 Mulhouse	Mixed team

Johnnie Torjussen (born 24 June 1999) is a former badminton player from England.

== Career ==
In 2020, he lost the finals at the Slovak Open to Jan Louda. In 2021, he became the national champion of England after winning the men's singles at the 2021 English National Badminton Championships by defeating Alex Lane. This earned him a place in representing England at the 2021 Sudirman Cup.

In 2022, he was selected as part of the squad to represent England in the 2022 Thomas Cup. In 2023, he won his third consecutive national singles title at the English National Badminton Championships, at the David Ross Sports Village in Nottingham.

Torjussen announced his retirement in December 2023, due to an ongoing meniscus injury.

== Achievements ==
=== BWF International Challenge/Series (1 title, 2 runners-up) ===
Men's singles
Year	Tournament	Opponent	Score	Result
2020	Slovak Open	(Czech Republic) Jan Louda	18–21, 21–12, 15–21	(silver) Runner-up
2023	Portugal International	(Denmark) Victor Ørding Kauffmann	21–13, 16–21, 21–18	(gold) Winner

Men's doubles
Year	Tournament	Partner	Opponent	Score	Result
2018	Hellas International	(England) David Jones	(Bulgaria) Daniel Nikolov (Bulgaria) Ivan Rusev	16–21, 19–21	(silver) Runner-up

BWF International Challenge tournament
BWF International Series tournament
BWF Future Series tournament
