= Ade Resky Dwicahyo =

Indonesian-Azerbaijani badminton player (born 1998)

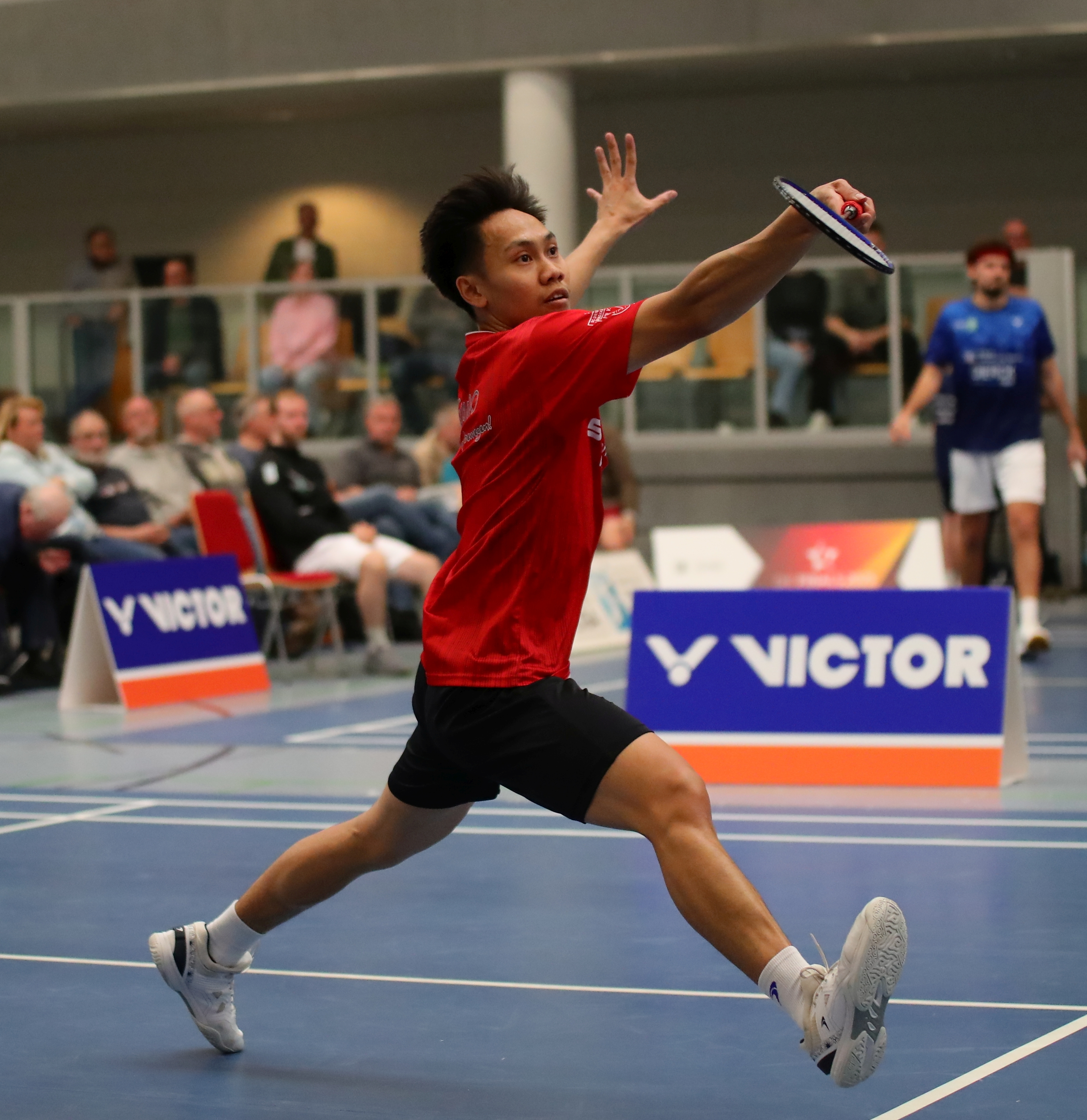

Personal information
- Born: 13 May 1998 (age 28) Kendari, Southeast Sulawesi, Indonesia
- Years active: 2014–present
- Height: 174 cm (5 ft 9 in)

Sport
- Country: Indonesia (2013–2017); Azerbaijan (2018–present)
- Sport: Badminton
- Handedness: Right

Men's singles & doubles
- Highest ranking: 56 (MS, 27 August 2024); 63 (MD with Azmy Qowimuramadhoni, 26 February 2019)
- Current ranking: 85 (MS, 3 November 2026)
- BWF profile

Ade Resky Dwicahyo (Azerbaijani: Edi Reski Dviçayo, born 13 May 1998) is an Indonesian-born Azerbaijani badminton player. Playing in the men's singles and men's doubles, he became an Azerbaijani naturalized citizen in 2018 to improve his chances "to be represented in world championships and Olympic Games". He represented Azerbaijan at the 2020 Summer Olympics and the 2024 Summer Olympics.

== Achievements ==
=== BWF International Challenge/Series (17 titles, 10 runners-up) ===
Men's singles
Year	Tournament	Opponent	Score	Result
2018	Kharkiv International	(Czech Republic) Jan Louda	14–21, 18–21	(silver) Runner-up
2018	Belarus International	(France) Léo Rossi	21–18, 15–21, 21–19	(gold) Winner
2018	Egypt International	(Hungary) Gergely Krausz	21–16, 21–16	(gold) Winner
2018	Bahrain International	(United States) Timothy Lam	21–13, 21–13	(gold) Winner
2018	Botswana International	(Azerbaijan) Azmy Qowimuramadhoni	21–14, 21–11	(gold) Winner
2018	Zambia International	(Nigeria) Anuoluwapo Juwon Opeyori	21–11, 22–20	(gold) Winner
2018	South Africa International	(Azerbaijan) Azmy Qowimuramadhoni	21–17, 21–23, 21–23	(silver) Runner-up
2019	Benin International	(Sri Lanka) Niluka Karunaratne	21–23, 17–21	(silver) Runner-up
2019	Ghana International	(India) Kiran George	23–25, 19–21	(silver) Runner-up
2019	Kharkiv International	(Netherlands) Mark Caljouw	15–21, 10–21	(silver) Runner-up
2019	Egypt International	(Czech Republic) Milan Ludík	21–17, 21–12	(gold) Winner
2019	Algeria International	(Spain) Pablo Abián	8–21, 6–21	(silver) Runner-up
2019	Cameroon International	(Austria) Luka Wraber	22–20, 19–21, 21–16	(gold) Winner
2022	Malta International	(Bulgaria) Dimitar Yanakiev	21–19, 17–21, 21–14	(gold) Winner
2023	Luxembourg Open	(India) Sankar Subramanian	11–21, 19–21	(silver) Runner-up
2023	Algeria International	(France) Sacha Lévêque	15–21, 21–13, 21–18	(gold) Winner
2025	Bonn International	(Canada) Joshua Nguyen	9–21, 21–17, 17–21	(silver) Runner-up
2026	Suriname International	(Azerbaijan) Dicky Dwi Pangestu	21–12, 21–17	(gold) Winner

Men's doubles
Year	Tournament	Partner	Opponent	Score	Result
2018	Belarus International	(Azerbaijan) Azmy Qowimuramadhoni	(France) Thomas Baures (France) Léo Rossi	21–18, 21–14	(gold) Winner
2018	Egypt International	(Azerbaijan) Azmy Qowimuramadhoni	(Egypt) Ali Ahmed El-Khateeb (Malaysia) Yogendran Khrishnan	18–21, 21–16, 21–18	(gold) Winner
2018	Bahrain International	(Azerbaijan) Azmy Qowimuramadhoni	(Bahrain) Adnan Ebrahim (Bahrain) Jaffer Ebrahim	21–15, 21–17	(gold) Winner
2018	Botswana International	(Azerbaijan) Azmy Qowimuramadhoni	(Zambia) Mabo Donald (Zambia) Kalombo Mulenga	21–9, 21–19	(gold) Winner
2018	Zambia International	(Azerbaijan) Azmy Qowimuramadhoni	(Nigeria) Godwin Olofua (Nigeria) Anuoluwapo Juwon Opeyori	21–19, 18–21, 21–11	(gold) Winner
2018	South Africa International	(Azerbaijan) Azmy Qowimuramadhoni	(South Africa) Jarred Elliott (South Africa) Sean Noone	21–15, 21–8	(gold) Winner
2022	Malta International	(Azerbaijan) Azmy Qowimuramadhoni	(Germany) Jarne Schlevoigt (Germany) Nikolaj Stupplich	20–22, 15–21	(silver) Runner-up
2023	Uganda International	(Azerbaijan) Azmy Qowimuramadhani	(Thailand) Pongsakorn Thongkham (Thailand) Wongsathorn Thongkham	19–21, 18–21	(silver) Runner-up
2026	Suriname International	(Azerbaijan) Dicky Dwi Pangestu	(Malaysia) Andy Kok (Malaysia) Lim Yu Sheng	21–8, 21–10	(gold) Winner

BWF International Challenge tournament
BWF International Series tournament
BWF Future Series tournament

== Performance timeline ==
Key

W	Won	F	Finalist	SF	Semi-finalist
QF	Quarter-finalist	#R	Rounds 4, 3, 2, 1	RR	Round-robin stage
Q#	Qualification round	A	Absent	w/d	Withdrew
G	Gold	S	Silver	B	Bronze
NH	Not held	N/A	Not applicable	DNQ	Did not qualify

=== National team ===
- Senior level

Team Events	2018	2019	2020	2021	2022	2023	2024	2025	2026
European Men's Team Championships	RR	NH	RR	NH			DNQ	NH	DNQ
European Mixed Team Championships	NH	A	NH	A	NH	A	NH	RR	NH

=== Individual competitions ===
==== Junior level ====
- Boys' singles

Events	2016
Asian Junior Championships	2R
World Junior Championships	3R

==== Senior level ====
===== Men's singles =====
Events	2020	2021	2022	2023	2024	2025	2026	Ref
European Championships	NH	2R	2R	NH	QF	2R	2R	
European Games	NH			2R	NH			
World Championships	NH	2R	1R	2R	NH	2R	2R	
Olympic Games	RR	NH			RR	NH		

Tournament	BWF World Tour								Best	Ref
Tournament	2019	2020	2021	2022	2023	2024	2025	2026	Best	Ref
Indonesia Masters	A			Q2	A				Q2 ('22)	
German Open	Q1	NH		A	1R	1R	A	Q2	1R ('23, '24)	
Swiss Open	A	NH	A	2R	A				2R ('22)	
Ruichang China Masters	A	NH			2R	A			2R ('23)	
Orléans Masters	1R	NH	1R	1R	Q1	2R	A		2R ('24)	
Thailand Open	A		NH	1R	A	Q1	A		1R ('22)	
Malaysia Masters	A		NH	Q2	A	Q1	A		Q2 ('22)	
Singapore Open	A	NH		Q2	A				Q2 ('22)	
Australian Open	A	NH		w/d	A					
Macau Open	A	NH				A		Q1	Q1 ('26)	
Taipei Open	A	NH		1R	A				1R ('22)	
Korea Masters	A	NH		A	1R	A			1R ('23)	
Indonesia Masters Super 100	2R	NH		A		2R	A		2R ('19, '24)	
Vietnam Open	1R	NH		A					1R ('19)	
Hylo Open	A				1R	2R	A	2R	2R ('24, '26)	
Syed Modi International	A	NH		2R	A	1R	A		2R ('22)	
Guwahati Masters	NH					3R	A		3R ('24)	
Odisha Masters	NA			w/d	A					
Spain Masters	A			NH	A	Q1	NH		Q1 ('24)	
Year-end ranking	78	71	74	68	63	68	95		56	
Tournament	2019	2020	2021	2022	2023	2024	2025	2026	Best	Ref

===== Men's doubles =====
Events	2022	2023
European Championships	2R	NH
European Games	NH	RR
World Championships	A	1R

Tournament	BWF World Tour					Best
Tournament	2019	2020	2021	2022	2023	Best
German Open	A	NH		A	1R	1R ('23)
Orléans Masters	1R	NH	A		Q2	1R ('19)
Hylo Open	A			1R	A	1R ('22)
Year-end ranking	219	224	305	140	129	63
Tournament	2019	2020	2021	2022	2023	Best
