= Azmy Qowimuramadhoni =

Indonesian-Azerbaijani badminton player (born 1999)

Personal information
- Born: 1 January 1999 (age 27) Surabaya, Indonesia
- Years active: 2015–present

Sport
- Country: Indonesia (2015–2017); Azerbaijan (2018–present)
- Sport: Badminton
- Handedness: Right

Men's singles & doubles
- Highest ranking: 113 (MS at 30 July 2019); 63 (MD at 12 March 2019)
- BWF profile

Azmy Qowimuramadhoni (born 1 January 1999) is an Indonesian-born Azerbaijani badminton player. Playing in men's singles and men's doubles, he became an Azerbaijani naturalized citizen in 2018.

== Achievements ==
=== BWF International Challenge/Series (7 titles, 4 runners-up) ===
Men's singles
Year	Tournament	Opponent	Score	Result
2018	Botswana International	(Azerbaijan) Ade Resky Dwicahyo	14–21, 11–21	(silver) Runner-up
2018	South Africa International	(Azerbaijan) Ade Resky Dwicahyo	17–21, 23–21, 23–21	(gold) Winner
2019	Giraldilla International	(Mexico) Job Castillo	12–21, 13–21	(silver) Runner-up

Men's doubles
Year	Tournament	Partner	Opponent	Score	Result
2018	Belarus International	(Azerbaijan) Ade Resky Dwicahyo	(France) Thomas Baures (France) Léo Rossi	21–18, 21–14	(gold) Winner
2018	Egypt International	(Azerbaijan) Ade Resky Dwicahyo	(Egypt) Ali Ahmed El-Khateeb (Malaysia) Yogendran Khrishnan	18–21, 21–16, 21–18	(gold) Winner
2018	Bahrain International	(Azerbaijan) Ade Resky Dwicahyo	(Bahrain) Adnan Ebrahim (Bahrain) Jaffer Ebrahim	21–15, 21–17	(gold) Winner
2018	Botswana International	(Azerbaijan) Ade Resky Dwicahyo	(Zambia) Mabo Donald (Zambia) Kalombo Mulenga	21–9, 21–19	(gold) Winner
2018	Zambia International	(Azerbaijan) Ade Resky Dwicahyo	(Nigeria) Godwin Olofua (Nigeria) Anuoluwapo Juwon Opeyori	21–19, 18–21, 21–11	(gold) Winner
2018	South Africa International	(Azerbaijan) Ade Resky Dwicahyo	(South Africa) Jarred Elliott (South Africa) Sean Noone	21–15, 21–8	(gold) Winner
2022	Malta International	(Azerbaijan) Ade Resky Dwicahyo	(Germany) Jarne Schlevoigt (Germany) Nikolaj Stupplich	20–22, 15–21	(silver) Runner-up
2023	Uganda International	(Azerbaijan) Ade Resky Dwicahyo	(Thailand) Pongsakorn Thongkham (Thailand) Wongsathorn Thongkham	19–21, 18–21	(silver) Runner-up

BWF International Challenge tournament
BWF International Series tournament
BWF Future Series tournament

=== BWF Junior International (1 titles, 2 runners-up) ===
Men's single
Year	Tournament	Opponent	Score	Result
2016	Czech Junior	(Czech Republic) Jan Louda	17–21, 15–21	(silver) Runner-up
2017	Valamar Junior Open	(France) Arnaud Merklé	13–21, 12–21	(silver) Runner-up

Men's doubles
Year	Tournament	Partner	Opponent	Score	Result
2017	Hellas Junior	(Czech Republic) Vojtěch Lapáček	(Bulgaria) Yoan Gargov (Bulgaria) Denis Marinov	21–15, 21–10	(gold) Winner

BWF Junior International Grand Prix tournament
BWF Junior International Challenge tournament
BWF Junior International Series tournament
BWF Junior Future Series tournament

== Performance timeline ==
Performance timeline

Key

W	Won	F	Finalist	SF	Semi-finalist
QF	Quarter-finalist	#R	Rounds 4, 3, 2, 1	RR	Round-robin stage
Q#	Qualification round	A	Absent	w/d	Withdrew
G	Gold	S	Silver	B	Bronze
NH	Not held	N/A	Not applicable	DNQ	Did not qualify

=== National team ===
- Senior level

Team Events	2018	2020
European Men's Team Championships	RR	RR

=== Individual competitions ===
==== Senior level ====
===== Men's singles =====
Events	2019
European Games	2R

Tournament	BWF World Tour	Best
Tournament	2019	Best
Orléans Masters	Q1	Q1 ('19)
Vietnam Open	1R	1R ('19)
Indonesia Masters Super 100	1R	1R ('19)
Year-end ranking	165	111

===== Men's doubles =====
Events	2022	2023
European Championships	2R	NH
European Games	NH	RR
World Championships	A	1R

Tournament	BWF World Tour					Best
Tournament	2019	2020	2021	2022	2023	Best
German Open	A	NH		A	1R	1R ('23)
Orléans Masters	1R	NH	A		Q2	1R ('19)
Hylo Open	A			1R		1R ('22)
Year-end ranking	219	224	305	140		63
