= Léo Rossi =

French badminton player (born 1999)

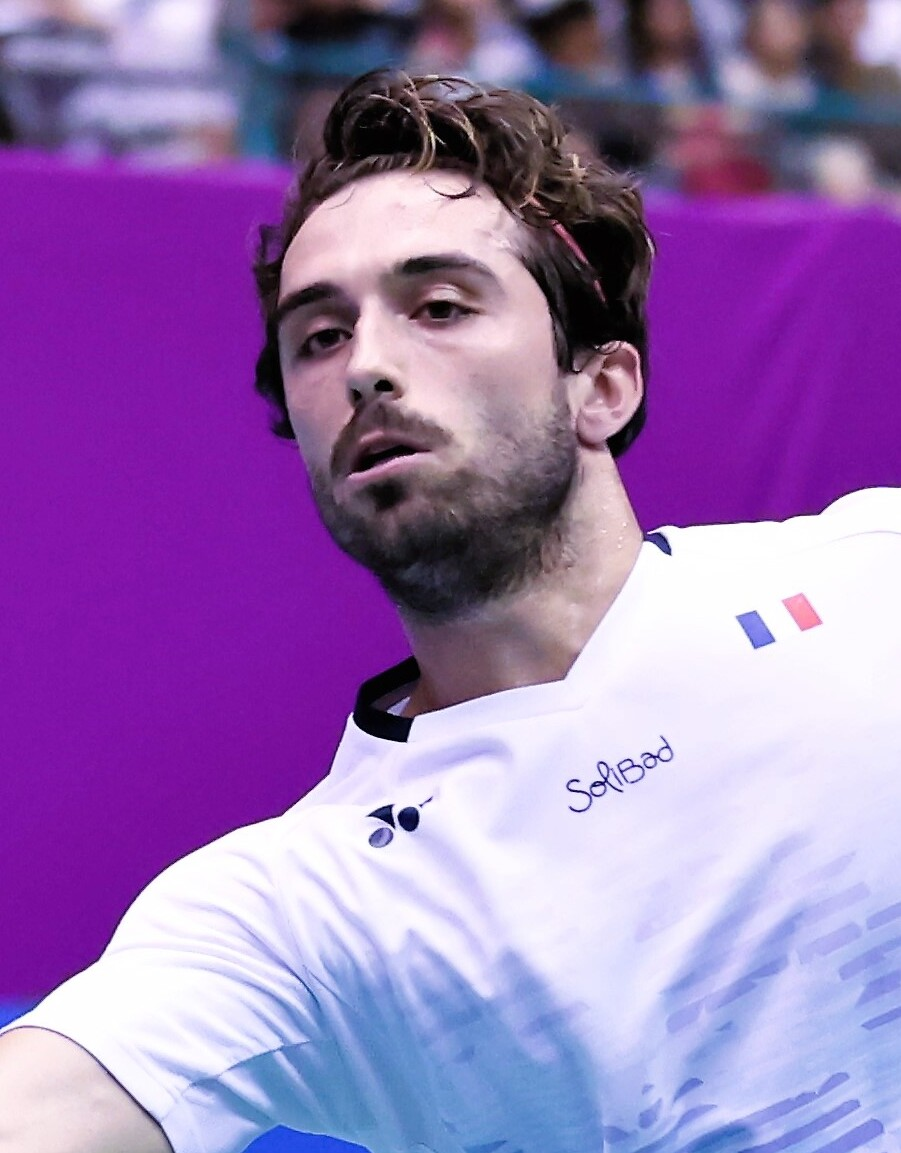
- Rossi at the 2024 Taipei Open

Personal information
- Born: 25 December 1999 (age 26) Grasse, France
- Height: 1.80 m (5 ft 11 in)
- Weight: 80 kg (176 lb)

Sport
- Country: France
- Sport: Badminton
- Handedness: Right

Men's singles & doubles
- Highest ranking: 135 (MS, 7 February 2019); 33 (MD with Éloi Adam, 22 September 2025)
- Current ranking: 50 (MD with Éloi Adam, 3 November 2026)
- BWF profile
Medal record
Men's badminton
Representing France
Thomas Cup
Silver medal – second place	2026 Horsens	Men's team
European Championships
Silver medal – second place	2025 Horsens	Men's doubles
European Mixed Team Championships
Silver medal – second place	2025 Baku	Mixed team
European Men's Team Championships
Gold medal – first place	2026 Istanbul	Men's team
Silver medal – second place	2024 Łódź	Men's team
Bronze medal – third place	2018 Kazan	Men's team
European Junior Championships
Gold medal – first place	2017 Mulhouse	Mixed team

Léo Rossi (born 25 December 1999) is a French badminton player. He was a part of the French junior team that won the mixed team gold at the 2017 European Junior Championships. He won his first international title at the 2017 Lithuanian International tournament in the men's doubles event partnered with Elias Bracke of Belgium. Rossi was part of the French team that made history in badminton by winning the first ever European Men's Team Championships title and the silver medal at the Thomas Cup in 2026.

His brother, Rémi Rossi, also plays badminton and represented Tahiti in the international tournament.

== Achievements ==
=== European Championships ===
Men's doubles
Year	Venue	Partner	Opponent	Score	Result
2025	Forum; Horsens, Denmark	(France) Éloi Adam	(France) Christo Popov (France) Toma Junior Popov	12–21, 21–18, 18–21	Silver

=== BWF International Challenge/Series (3 titles, 9 runners-up) ===
Men's singles
Year	Tournament	Opponent	Score	Result
2017	Lithuanian International	(Germany) Kai Schäfer	17–21, 14–21	(silver) Runner-up
2018	Latvia International	(France) Toma Junior Popov	10–21, 15–21	(silver) Runner-up
2018	Belarus International	(Azerbaijan) Ade Resky Dwicahyo	18–21, 21–15, 19–21	(silver) Runner-up
2018	Hellas Open	(Poland) Adrian Dziółko	11–21, 21–19, 19–21	(silver) Runner-up
2018	Irish Open	(Germany) Lars Schänzler	21–17, 21–9	(gold) Winner

Men's doubles
Year	Tournament	Partner	Opponent	Score	Result
2017	Lithuanian International	(Belgium) Elias Bracke	(Poland) Łukasz Moreń (Poland) Wojciech Szkudlarczyk	21–19, 21–18	(gold) Winner
2018	Belarus International	(France) Thomas Baures	(Azerbaijan) Ade Resky Dwicahyo (Azerbaijan) Azmy Qowimuramadhoni	18–21, 14–21	(silver) Runner-up
2022	Lithuanian International	(France) Kenji Lovang	(Indonesia) Rayhan Fadillah (Indonesia) Rahmat Hidayat	9–21, 13–21	(silver) Runner-up
2023	Future Series Nouvelle-Aquitaine	(France) Éloi Adam	(France) Louis Ducrot (France) Quentin Ronget	21–16, 21–13	(gold) Winner
2024	Turkey International	(France) Éloi Adam	(France) Julien Maio (France) William Villeger	15–21, 21–17, 13–21	(silver) Runner-up
2024	Scottish Open	(France) Éloi Adam	(Denmark) William Kryger Boe (Denmark) Christian Faust Kjær	21–9, 19–21, 17–21	(silver) Runner-up
2026	Valence Alpes International	(France) Éloi Adam	(France) Maël Cattoen (France) William Villeger	19–21, 21–12, 19–21	(silver) Runner-up

BWF International Challenge tournament
BWF International Series tournament
BWF Future Series tournament
