= Marie Batomene =

French badminton player (born 1995)

Personal information
- Born: 10 March 1995 (age 31) Béthune, France
- Height: 1.65 m (5 ft 5 in)
- Weight: 65 kg (143 lb)

Sport
- Country: France
- Sport: Badminton

Women's singles & doubles
- Highest ranking: WS: 58 (11 May 2021); WD: 40 with Émilie Lefel (8 July 2016); XD: 176 with Jordan Corvée (17 October 2013)
- BWF profile
Medal record
Women's badminton
Representing France
European Women's Team Championships
Bronze medal – third place	2020 Liévin	Women's team
European Mixed Team Championships
Silver medal – second place	2021 Vantaa	Mixed team
European Junior Championships
Silver medal – second place	2013 Ankara	Mixed team

Marie Batomene (born 10 March 1995) is a French badminton player. She started playing badminton at the age of eight, in her hometown Béthune. She was part of the national junior team that won the silver medal at the 2013 European Junior Championships. She clinched the women's singles national champion in 2019, where she before finished as the runners-up in 2013 and 2017. She competed at the 2018 Mediterranean Games and 2019 European Games.

== Achievements ==
=== BWF International Challenge/Series (3 titles, 5 runners-up) ===
Women's singles
Year	Tournament	Opponent	Score	Result
2017	Welsh International	(India) Tanvi Lad	15–21, 8–21	(silver) Runner-up
2018	Belarus International	(Russia) Anastasiia Semenova	25–23, 21–15	(gold) Winner
2019	Algeria International	(France) Yaëlle Hoyaux	21–14, 21–17	(gold) Winner
2021	Portugal International	(Hungary) Laura Sárosi	19–21, 19–21	(silver) Runner-up

Women's doubles
Year	Tournament	Partner	Opponent	Score	Result
2015	Lithuanian International	(France) Teshana Vignes Waran	(Germany) Luise Heim (Germany) Yvonne Li	21–11, 21–7	(gold) Winner
2015	Eurasia Bulgaria International	(France) Anne Tran	(Vietnam) Lê Thu Huyền (Vietnam) Phạm Như Thảo	16–21, 9–21	(silver) Runner-up
2015	Czech Open	(France) Émilie Lefel	(Germany) Isabel Herttrich (Germany) Birgit Michels	13–21, 9–21	(silver) Runner-up

Mixed doubles
Year	Tournament	Partner	Opponent	Score	Result
2013	Irish International	(France) Jordan Corvée	(Finland) Anton Kaisti (Finland) Jenny Nyström	22–20, 17–21, 13–21	(silver) Runner-up

BWF International Challenge tournament
BWF International Series tournament
BWF Future Series tournament
