= Belarus International =

The Belarus International in badminton is an international open held in Belarus since 2018 and are thereby one of the most recent international championships in Europe.

After the 2022 Russian invasion of Ukraine, the Badminton World Federation (BWF) banned all Belarusian players and officials from BWF events, and cancelled all BWF tournaments in Belarus.

== Previous winners ==
The table below gives an overview of the winners at the tournament.

Year	Men's singles	Women's singles	Men's doubles	Women's doubles	Mixed doubles
2018 FS	(Indonesia) Ade Resky Dwicahyo	(France) Marie Batomene	(Indonesia) Ade Resky Dwicahyo (Indonesia) Azmy Qowimuramadhoni	(Russia) Olga Arkhangelskaya (Russia) Elizaveta Tarasova	(Poland) Robert Cybulski (Poland) Wiktoria Dabczynska
2019 IS	(China) Lei Lanxi	(China) Wang Zhiyi	(China) Ou Xuanyi (China) Zhang Nan	(China) Yu Xiaohan (China) Zhang Shuxian	(China) Ren Xiangyu (China) Zhou Chaomin

== Performances by nation ==
Top Nations
Pos	Nation	MS	WS	MD	WD	XD	Total
1	China	1	1	1	1	1	5
2	Indonesia	1		1			2
3	France		1				1
3	Poland					1	1
3	Russia				1		1
Total		2	2	2	2	2	10
