= Daniel Nikolov =

Bulgarian badminton player (born 1998)

Personal information
- Born: Daniel Lachezarov Nikolov; 26 August 1998 (age 28) Haskovo, Bulgaria
- Height: 1.73 m (5 ft 8 in)
- Weight: 65 kg (143 lb)

Sport
- Country: Bulgaria
- Sport: Badminton

Men's singles & doubles
- Highest ranking: 92 (MS 18 October 2022); 91 (MD 5 October 2017)
- BWF profile

Daniel Lachezarov Nikolov (Bulgarian: Даниел Лъчезаров Николов) (born 26 August 1998) is a Bulgarian badminton player. He was awarded 2017 Haskovo Sportsman of the Year. Nikolov competed at the 2019 European Games.

== Achievements ==
=== BWF International Challenge/Series (8 titles, 4 runners-up) ===
Men's singles
Year	Tournament	Opponent	Score	Result
2016	Bulgarian International	(Scotland) Ben Torrance	21–14, 21–18	(gold) Winner
2018	Croatian International	(Russia) Georgii Karpov	21–12, 21–12	(gold) Winner
2021	Bulgarian International	(India) Meiraba Luwang Maisnam	19–21, 21–7, 14–21	(silver) Runner-up
2021	Hungarian International	(India) Sathish Kumar Karunakaran	21–17, 21–18	(gold) Winner

Men's doubles
Year	Tournament	Partner	Opponent	Score	Result
2015	Eurasia Bulgaria International	(Bulgaria) Ivan Rusev	(France) Jordan Corvée (France) Julien Maio	21–18, 23–25, 17–21	(silver) Runner-up
2016	Hellas International	(Bulgaria) Ivan Rusev	(Bulgaria) Peyo Boichinov (Bulgaria) Philip Shishov	21–19, 21–16	(gold) Winner
2016	Bulgarian International	(Bulgaria) Ivan Rusev	(Turkey) Muhammed Ali Kurt (Turkey) Mert Tunço	21–13, 21–18	(gold) Winner
2017	Hellas International	(Bulgaria) Ivan Rusev	(Germany) Daniel Benz (Germany) Andreas Heinz	21–15, 11–21, 23–21	(gold) Winner
2017	Romanian International	(Bulgaria) Ivan Rusev	(Slovenia) Andraž Krapež (Thailand) Samatcha Tovannakasem	15–21, 15–21	(silver) Runner-up
2018	Hellas International	(Bulgaria) Ivan Rusev	(England) David Jones (England) Johnnie Torjussen	21–16, 21–19	(gold) Winner
2019	Slovak Open	(Bulgaria) Ivan Rusev	(Thailand) Supak Jomkoh (Thailand) Wachirawit Sothon	13–21, 14–21	(silver) Runner-up
2020	Bulgarian International	(Bulgaria) Ivan Rusev	(Slovenia) Miha Ivanič (Slovenia) Gašper Krivec	21–9, 21–14	(gold) Winner

BWF International Challenge tournament
BWF International Series tournament
BWF Future Series tournament
